= Budućnost–Crvena Zvezda basketball rivalry =

ABA League rivalry

Budućnost–Crvena zvezda rivalry
- Sport: Basketball
- Location: Western Balkans
- Teams: (Montenegro) Budućnost; (Serbia) Crvena zvezda
- First meeting: 7 December 1980; Crvena zvezda 105, Budućnost 91
- Latest meeting: 10 February 2025; Crvena zvezda 89, Budućnost 96
- Stadiums: Aleksandar Nikolić Hall, Belgrade; Morača Sports Center, Podgorica

Statistics
- Total meetings: 108 meetings
- Most wins: Crvena zvezda (.579)
- All-time record: Crvena zvezda, 62–45
- Regular season series: Crvena zvezda, 46–36 (.561)
- Postseason results: Crvena zvezda, 13–9 (.591)
- Largest victory: +43; Crvena zvezda 97, Budućnost 54; 14 April 2019
- Current win streak: Crvena zvezda, 3

Finals history
- 2018 ABA League Finals: Budućnost won, 3–1; 2019 ABA League Finals: Crvena zvezda won, 3–2; 2021 ABA League Finals: Crvena zvezda won, 3–2; 2018 ABA SuperCup Final: Crvena zvezda won

Budućnost	Crvena zvezda

The Budućnost–Crvena Zvezda basketball rivalry is an Adriatic League (ABA League) rivalry between Budućnost and Crvena zvezda. While the two teams have played each other since Budućnost joined the Yugoslav League in 1980, their rivalry began to develop in the 1990s through the Serbian-Montenegrin League and reached its peak in the Adriatic League during the late 2010s and early 2020s with 3-in-a-row League Finals (2018, 2019, and 2021). (Note: The 2019–20 ABA League First Division was canceled due to the COVID-19 pandemic.)

== History ==
=== 1980s: Yugoslavia ===
The first time these two teams actually met was in 1980 when Budućnost qualified for the Yugoslav League for the first time in history. The first derby finished 105–91 in Zvezda's favour. Generally, the rivalry wasn’t prominent in the Yugoslav era since both teams had fluctuations in their results in the 80’s, thus they didn’t have the status as constant contenders for the title.

==== Head-to-head ranking ====
#	46	47	48	49	50	51	52	53	54	55	56	57	58	59	60	61	62	63	64	65	66	67	68	69	70	71	72	73	74	75	76	77	78	79	80	81	82	83	84	85	86	87	88	89	90	91	92
1	1	1	1	1	1	1	1	1	1	1														1			1																				
2														2											2			2											2	2		2			2		2
3												3	3						3			3	3			3			3								3										
4											4										4									4								4						4			
5																															5				5	5					5						
6															6	6																6											6				
7																																		7						7							
8																	8	8		8													8			8	8		8		8						
9																																										9				9	
10																																						10								10	10
11																																															
12																																											12				
13																																															
14																																															

=== 1992–2006: Serbia and Montenegro ===
==== Head-to-head ranking ====
#	93	94	95	96	97	98	99	00	01	02	03	04	05	06
1	1	1				1	1	1	1					
2							2			2				2
3			3	3		3		3			3	3		
4					4						4		4	4
5												5		
6				6										
7										7			7	
8														
9														
10	10								10					
11		11												
12					12									
13														
14														

=== 2003 onwards: Adriatic ===
==== Head-to-head ranking ====
#	02	03	04	05	06	07	08	09	10	11	12	13	14	15	16	17	18	19	~~20~~	21	22
1														1	1	1	1	1		1	1
2												2					2	2	(2)	2	
3		3		3	3								3	3	3				(3)		3
4			4					4		4	4					4					
5			5			5	5		5			5	5								
6						6	6	6													
7																					
8																					
9	9								9												
10											10										
11																					
12																					
13										13											
14				14																	
15																					
16																					

== Finals summaries ==
=== 2018 ABA League Finals ===
This was the first ABA League Finals series between Budućnost and Crvena Zvezda, and the first Finals of any competition to occur between Budućnost and Crvena Zvezda since their first meeting in 1980. Budućnost hadn't made an appearance in the ABA Finals prior to 2018. Budućnost won the championship, 3–1. Nemanja Gordić of Budućnost was named the Finals MVP.

9 April 2018 2017–18 Finals 1	Crvena zvezda mts	76–80	Budućnost VOLI	Belgrade
19:00	Scoring by quarter: 22–25, 16–12, 19–26, 19–17
	Pts: Omić 14; Rebs: Lessort 5 Asts: Rochestie 10; PIR: Rochestie 20	Report	Pts: Ivanović 20; Rebs: Doellman 8 Asts: Gordić, Doellman 4 PIR: Gordić, Ivanović 23	Arena: Aleksandar Nikolić Hall; Attendance: 7,001; Referees: Matej Boltauzer, Sreten Radović, Tomislav Hordov

10 April 2018 2017–18 Finals 2	Crvena zvezda mts	69–59	Budućnost VOLI	Belgrade
18:30	Scoring by quarter: 17–13, 14–18, 16–17, 22–11
	Pts: Omić 15; Rebs: Omić 10; Asts: Feldeine, Rochestie 5 PIR: Omić 27	Report	Pts: Gordić 22; Rebs: Doellman 6 Asts: three players 2 PIR: Gordić 12	Arena: Aleksandar Nikolić Hall; Attendance: 6,398; Referees: Ilija Belošević, Saša Pukl, Miloš Koljenšić

13 April 2018 2017–18 Finals 3	Budućnost VOLI	78–77	Crvena zvezda mts	Podgorica
20:00	Scoring by quarter: 24–23, 18–24, 26–17, 10–13
	Pts: Gordić 17; Rebs: Ivanović 4 Asts: Gordić 5 PIR: Gordić 21	Report	Pts: Feldeine 19; Rebs: Lessort 6 Asts: Feldeine, Rochestie 5 PIR: Feldeine 20	Arena: Morača Sports Center; Attendance: 6,000; Referees: Damir Javor, Tomislav Hordov, Mario Majkić

14 April 2018 2017–18 Finals 4	Budućnost VOLI	77–73	Crvena zvezda mts	Podgorica
21:00	Scoring by quarter: 22–15, 14–23, 24–19, 17–16
	Pts: Gordić 18; Rebs: Šehović 6 Asts: Gordić 5 PIR: Barović 23	Report	Pts: Rochestie 14; Rebs: Omić 10; Asts: Rochestie 6 PIR: Omić 21	Arena: Morača Sports Center; Attendance: 6,000; Referees: Sreten Radović, Saša Pukl, Sašo Petek

=== 2018 ABA SuperCup Final ===
The Budućnost and Crvena Zvezda would meet the six months after the 2018 ABA League Finals in Laktaši, Bosnia and Herzegovina. Crvena Zvezda would defeat Budućnost and win their first ABA SuperCup title. The Zvezda had an 89–75 victory, while Budućnost lost its second Supercup Final.

The Zvezda led 48–23 in the middle of the second quarter and sustained to 57–32 to lead by 25 at halftime. As the first half ended, so did the second half. Buducnost took advantage of the relaxation of the Belgraders in the last quarter and mitigated the defeat to a more acceptable 14 points difference.

The Zvezda's Mouhammad Faye had 14 points and four rebounds, and Maik Zirbes added 13 points and five rebounds. Joe Ragland recorded 10 points and the game-high 7 assists, while Stratos Perperoglou and Ognjen Dobrić both had 12 points off the bench. Budućnost was led by Filip Barović with 19 points and five rebounds of the bench, and Earl Clark added 11 points. Faye was named the MVP Award.

23 September 2018 2018 SuperCup Final	Budućnost VOLI	75–89	Crvena zvezda mts	Laktaši
21:00	Scoring by quarter: 16–28, 16–29, 23–21, 20–11
Arena Sport	Pts: Barović 19; Rebs: Clarke 6 Asts: Jackson 5 PIR: Barović 23	Boxscore	Pts: Faye 14; Rebs: Zirbes, Lazić 5 Asts: Ragland 7 PIR: Zirbes 16	Arena: Laktaši Sports Hall; Attendance: 2,500; Referees: Saša Pukl, Tomislav Hordov, Mario Majkić

=== 2019 ABA League Finals ===
The 2019 ABA League Finals saw Budućnost and Crvena Zvezda meet for the second straight season. Crvena Zvezda won Games 1 and 2 in Belgrade before the series moved to Podgorica. While Budućnost won Game 3 and 4 at home, the Zvezda took Game 5 at home, earning their fourth championship and their fourth in five seasons.

Game 2 was a more one-sided affair, with the Zvezda winning 107–69. Game 5 was a blowout victory for the Zvezda, 97–54, led by K. C. Rivers with the game-high 21 points. The Zvezda's Billy Baron was named the Finals MVP.

12 April 2019 2018–19 Finals 1	Crvena zvezda mts	91–72	Budućnost VOLI	Belgrade
19:00	Scoring by quarter: 18–20, 27–22, 20–10, 26–20
Arena Sport	Pts: Baron 19; Rebs: Zirbes, Ojo 6 Asts: Čović 6 PIR: Baron 27	Boxscore	Pts: Cole 18; Rebs: Bitadze, Clarke 6 Asts: Cole, Gordić 4 PIR: Cole 16	Arena: Aleksandar Nikolić Hall; Attendance: 6,374; Referees: Matej Boltauzer, Saša Pukl, Tomislav Hordov

14 April 2019 2018–19 Finals 2	Crvena zvezda mts	107–69	Budućnost VOLI	Belgrade
19:00	Scoring by quarter: 26–19, 28–19, 22–16, 31–15
Arena Sport	Pts: Perperoglou 17; Rebs: Faye 6 Asts: Čović 7 PIR: Rivers 20	Boxscore	Pts: Gordić 11; Rebs: Jackson 7 Asts: Gordić 6 PIR: Gordić 18	Arena: Aleksandar Nikolić Hall; Attendance: 6,397; Referees: Sreten Radović, Damir Javor, Miloš Koljenšić

17 April 2019 2018–19 Finals 3	Budućnost VOLI	80–72	Crvena zvezda mts	Podgorica
19:00	Scoring by quarter: 18–25, 27–25, 21–8, 14–14
Arena Sport	Pts: Cole 20; Rebs: Cole 7 Asts: Gordić 4 PIR: Cole 20	Boxscore	Pts: Rivers 19; Rebs: Faye, Ojo 10; Asts: Čović 4 PIR: Faye 15	Arena: Morača Sports Center; Attendance: 5,860; Referees: Tomislav Hordov, Mario Majkić, Marko Juras

19 April 2019 2018–19 Finals 4	Budućnost VOLI	84–80	Crvena zvezda mts	Podgorica
19:00	Scoring by quarter: 20–25, 15–13, 22–20, 27–22
Arena Sport	Pts: Cole 31; Rebs: Cole, Clark 6 Asts: Cole 6 PIR: Cole 36	Boxscore	Pts: Baron 24; Rebs: Ojo 10; Asts: Faye 4 PIR: Baron 23	Arena: Morača Sports Center; Attendance: 5,360; Referees: Damir Javor, Sašo Petek, Uroš Nikolić

22 April 2019 2018–19 Finals 5	Crvena zvezda mts	97–54	Budućnost VOLI	Belgrade
19:00	Scoring by quarter: 18–13, 29–8, 27–16, 23–17
Arena Sport	Pts: Rivers 21; Rebs: Ojo, Rivers 6 Asts: Čović 9 PIR: Rivers, Simanić 21	Boxscore	Pts: Cole 9 Rebs: Clark 7 Asts: Cole 3 PIR: Cole, Gordić 10	Arena: Aleksandar Nikolić Hall; Attendance: 6,500; Referees: Saša Pukl, Tomislav Hordov, Mario Majkić

=== 2021 ABA League Finals ===
The 2019 ABA League Finals saw Budućnost and Crvena Zvezda meet for the third straight season. Crvena Zvezda won Games 1 and 2 in Belgrade before the series moved to Podgorica. While Budućnost won Game 3 and 4 at home, the Zvezda took Game 5 at home, earning their fifth championship and their fifth in seven seasons.

16 May 2021 2020–21 Finals 1	Crvena zvezda mts	82–78	Budućnost VOLI	Belgrade
18:30	Scoring by quarter: 20–20, 24–18, 19–17, 19–23
	Pts: Dobrić, Loyd 23; Rebs: Kuzmić 11; Asts: Hall 7 PIR: Loyd 23	Boxscore	Pts: Reed 26; Rebs: Reed 10; Asts: Ivanović 10; PIR: Reed 35	Arena: Aleksandar Nikolić Hall; Attendance: 987; Referees: Saša Pukl, Tomislav Hordov, Josip Radojković

18 May 2021 2020–21 Finals 2	Crvena zvezda mts	85–79	Budućnost VOLI	Belgrade
20:30	Scoring by quarter: 30–17, 25–24, 8–29, 22–9
	Pts: Dobrić 27; Rebs: Nnoko 7 Asts: Loyd 6 PIR: Dobrić 27	Boxscore	Pts: D. Nikolić 26; Rebs: Reed 11; Asts: Ivanović 5 PIR: D. Nikolić 30	Arena: Aleksandar Nikolić Hall; Attendance: 1,375; Referees: Ilija Belošević, Miloš Koljenšić, Milan Nedović

22 May 2021 2020–21 Finals 3	Budućnost VOLI	75–71	Crvena zvezda mts	Podgorica
20:30	Scoring by quarter: 15–19, 20–13, 16–15, 24–24
	Pts: Della Valle 19; Rebs: D. Nikolić 8 Asts: Ivanović 6 PIR: Ivanović 19	Boxscore	Pts: Loyd 19; Rebs: Nnoko 11; Asts: Loyd 7 PIR: Nnoko 20	Arena: Morača Sports Center; Attendance: 0 Referees: Sreten Radović, Matej Boltauzer, Damir Javor

24 May 2021 2020–21 Finals 4	Budućnost VOLI	81–80	Crvena zvezda mts	Podgorica
20:30	Scoring by quarter: 19–23, 20–19, 19–21, 23 –17
	Pts: Cobbs 22; Rebs: D. Nikolić 9 Asts: Cobbs 7 PIR: Cobbs 29	Boxscore	Pts: Loyd 23; Rebs: Loyd 7 Asts: Dobrić 6 PIR: Dobrić 17	Arena: Morača Sports Center; Attendance: 0 Referees: Saša Pukl, Uroš Nikolić, Sašo Petek

28 May 2021 2020–21 Finals 5	Crvena zvezda mts	67–60	Budućnost VOLI	Belgrade
20:30	Scoring by quarter: 15–14, 18–14, 20–21, 14–11
	Pts: Nnoko 17; Rebs: Nnoko 12; Asts: Dobrić, Loyd 4 PIR: Nnoko 28	Boxscore	Pts: Cobbs 21; Rebs: Mitrović 9 Asts: Ivanović 8 PIR: Cobbs 26	Arena: Aleksandar Nikolić Hall; Attendance: 4,235; Referees: Tomislav Hordov, Josip Radojković, Milan Nedović

== Head-to-head ==
=== Matches ===
The following are the matches between Budućnost and Crvena Zvezda in the Adriatic League:

Season	At Belgrade (Crvena Zvezda – Budućnost)		At Podgorica (Budućnost – Crvena Zvezda)		SuperCup (Budućnost – Crvena Zvezda)	Total	Notes
Season	Season	Playoffs	Season	Playoffs	SuperCup (Budućnost – Crvena Zvezda)	Total	Notes
2001–02	Crvena Zvezda did not participate				Not held	—	—
2002–03	Budućnost did not participate				Not held	—	Crvena Zvezda lose Semifinals
2003–04	77–75	—	84–88	—	Not held	Crvena Zvezda 2–0	Crvena Zvezda lose Semifinals
2004–05	91–72	—	81–76	—	Not held	Tie 1–1	—
2005–06	Budućnost did not participate				Not held	—	Crvena Zvezda lose Semifinals
2006–07	95–81	—	89–88	—	Not held	Tie 1–1	—
2007–08	115–114	—	79–74	—	Not held	Tie 1–1	—
2008–09	70–63	—	64–62	—	Not held	Tie 1–1	Crvena Zvezda lose Semifinals
2009–10	77–88	—	71–63	—	Not held	Budućnost 2–0	—
2010–11	63–55	—	89–75	—	Not held	Tie 1–1	Budućnost lose Semifinals
2011–12	63–57	—	79–64	—	Not held	Tie 1–1	Budućnost lose Semifinals
2012–13	79–63	—	72–63	—	Not held	Tie 1–1	Crvena Zvezda lose Finals
2013–14	74–64	—	62–60	—	Not held	Tie 1–1	Crvena Zvezda lose Semifinals
2014–15	83–69	—	76–77	—	Not held	Crvena Zvezda 2–0	Crvena Zvezda win ABA League; Budućnost lose Semifinals
2015–16	83–62	—	68–54	—	Not held	Tie 1–1	Crvena Zvezda win ABA League; Budućnost lose Semifinals
2016–17	82–66	82–67, 82–59	54–77	63–57	Not held	Crvena Zvezda 4–1	Crvena Zvezda win ABA League; Budućnost lose Semifinals
2017–18	75–79	76–80, 69–59	92–86	78–77, 77–73	Crvena Zvezda did not participate (Note: Top seeded Crvena Zvezda withdrew participation due to the previously scheduled EuroLeague tournament, which was held on the same time.)	Budućnost 5–1	Budućnost win ABA League; Crvena Zvezda lose Finals; Budućnost lose ABA SuperCup Final
2018–19	86–72	91–72, 107–69, 97–54	71–87	80–72, 84–80	75–89	Crvena Zvezda 6–2	Crvena Zvezda win ABA League; Crvena Zvezda win ABA SuperCup; Budućnost lose Finals; Budućnost lose ABA SuperCup Final
2019–20	81–89	Canceled	20–0 (Note: Crvena Zvezda was forfeited 0–20 due to unjustified non-appearance in the Podgorica game.)	Canceled	—	Budućnost 2–0	Season canceled
2020–21	65–67	82–78, 85–79, 67–60	83–63	75–71, 81–80	Canceled	Budućnost 4–3	Crvena Zvezda win ABA League; Budućnost lose Finals
2021–22	71–63	—	76–80	—	Not held	Crvena Zvezda 2–0	Crvena Zvezda win ABA League; Budućnost lose Semifinals
2022–23	69–65	93–55,	56–76	56–97	Not held	Crvena Zvezda 4–0	TBD

=== Matches in defunct competitions ===
==== 1980–1992: Yugoslavia ====
The following were the matches between Budućnost and Crvena Zvezda in the Yugoslav competitions: (Note: The competitions in the Federal Republic of Yugoslavia (after 1991) are not included.)

==== 1992–2006: Serbia and Montenegro ====
The following were the matches between Budućnost and Crvena Zvezda in Yugoslav/Serb–Montenegrin (Note: The country was named the Federal Republic of Yugoslavia until 2003 and Serbia and Montenegro after that.) competitions:

Matches
Season	At Belgrade (Crvena Zvezda – Budućnost)		At Podgorica (Budućnost – Crvena Zvezda)		Yugoslav Cup / Radivoj Korać Cup (Crvena Zvezda – Partizan)	Total	Notes
Season	Season	Post-season	Season	Post-season	Yugoslav Cup / Radivoj Korać Cup (Crvena Zvezda – Partizan)	Total	Notes
1992–93	N/A	N/A	N/A	N/A	N/A	0–0	Crvena Zvezda win League
1993–94	N/A	N/A	N/A	N/A	N/A	0–0	Crvena Zvezda win League; Crvena Zvezda lose Cup Final
1994–95	N/A	N/A	N/A	N/A	N/A	0–0	—
1995–96	N/A	N/A	N/A	N/A	N/A	0–0	Budućnost win Cup
1996–97	N/A	N/A	N/A	N/A	N/A	0–0	—
1997–98	N/A	N/A	N/A	N/A	N/A	0–0	Crvena Zvezda win League; Budućnost win Cup
1998–99	N/A	Not held	N/A	Not held	N/A	0–0	Budućnost win League
1999–00	N/A	—	N/A	—	N/A	Budućnost 2–0	Budućnost win League
2000–01	85–89	—	92–73	—	—	Budućnost 2–0	Budućnost win both titles
2001–02	N/A	—	N/A	—	N/A	0–0	Budućnost lose both finals
2002–03	N/A	—	N/A	—	—	0–0	—
2003–04	N/A	—	N/A	—	—	0–0	Crvena Zvezda win Cup
2004–05	N/A	—	N/A	—	—	0–0	—
2005–06	N/A	—	N/A	—	—	0–0	Crvena Zvezda win Cup

=== Statistics ===
Note: Last updated on 15 January 2023

Competitions	Games played	Budućnost wins	Crvena Zvezda wins
Defunct competitions
Domestic Leagues	46	19 (.413)	27 (.587)
Domestic Playoffs	5	1 (.200)	4 (.800)
Domestic Playouts	2	0 (.000)	2 (1.000)
Yugoslav Cup	1	1 (1.000)	0 (.000)
Current competitions
Adriatic League	38	17 (.447)	21 (.553)
Adriatic Playoffs	17	8 (.471)	9 (.529)
Adriatic SuperCup	1	0 (.000)	1 (1.000)
Total	110	45 (.426)	64 (.574)

== Common individuals ==
=== Players ===
The following players have played for both Budućnost and Crvena zvezda in their careers:

- (Serbia and Montenegro) Milutin Aleksić – Crvena zvezda (2000–2002); Budućnost (2002–2004)
- (Serbia) Dragan Apić – Crvena zvezda (2017); Budućnost (2020–2021)
- (Serbia) Nemanja Arnautović – Budućnost (2010); Crvena zvezda (2010)
- (Montenegro) Boris Bakić – Budućnost (2003–2004); Crvena zvezda (2007–2011)
- (Serbia and Montenegro) Goran Bošković – Budućnost (1998–1999); Crvena zvezda (1999–2000)
- (Montenegro) Omar Cook – Crvena zvezda (2007–2008); Budućnost (2014–2016)
- (Serbia and Montenegro) Goran Ćakić – Budućnost (2002); Crvena zvezda (2002–2003)
- (Serbia) Tadija Dragićević – Crvena zvezda (2004–2005, 2006–2010, 2014); Budućnost (2015–2016)
- (Serbia) Vladislav Dragojlović – Crvena zvezda (2003–2006); Budućnost (2007–2008)
- (Serbia and Montenegro) Igor Đaletić – Budućnost (1989–1990, 1992–1993, 1995–1997); Crvena zvezda (2002)
- (Socialist Federal Republic of Yugoslavia) Vladislav Dragojlović – Crvena zvezda (1978–1980); Budućnost (1984–1985)
- (Serbia and Montenegro) Aleksandar Gilić – Crvena zvezda (1988–1990, 1993–1996); Budućnost (1996–1997)
- (Montenegro) Nikola Ivanović – Budućnost (2011–2015, 2017–2021); Crvena zvezda (2021–present)
- (Serbia) Marko Jagodić-Kuridža – Crvena zvezda (2019–2021); Budućnost (2021–present)
- (Montenegro) Goran Jeretin – Crvena zvezda (2002–2006); Budućnost (2006, 2009–2010)
- (Serbia and Montenegro) Nikola Jestratijević – Crvena zvezda (1994–1995, 1998–2000, 2004); Budućnost (2001–2002)
- (Serbia and Montenegro) Zoran Jovanović – Crvena zvezda (1987–1993); Budućnost (1997–1998)
- (Bosnia and Herzegovina) Siniša Kovačević – Crvena zvezda (1996–1997); Budućnost (2002–2003)
- (Serbia and Montenegro) Vladimir Kuzmanović – Crvena zvezda (1997–1998); Budućnost (1999–2002)
- (Serbia) Marko Lekić – Crvena zvezda (2008); Budućnost (2009–2010)
- (United States) Hassan Martin – Budućnost (2019–2020); Crvena zvezda (2022–present)
- (Montenegro) Stevan Milošević – Budućnost (2004–2007); Crvena zvezda (2008)
- (Serbia) Strahinja Milošević – Crvena zvezda (2010–2011); Budućnost (2012–2013)
- (Serbia) Nenad Mišanović – Crvena zvezda (2005–2008); Budućnost (2008–2009)
- (Serbia) Luka Mitrović – Crvena zvezda (2012–2017; 2021–present); Budućnost (2020–2021)
- (Bosnia and Herzegovina) Aleksej Nešović – Crvena zvezda (2002–2004); Budućnost (2010–2011)
- (Serbia and Montenegro) Saša Obradović – Crvena zvezda (1987–1993, 1993–1994, 1999–2000); Budućnost (2000–2001)
- (Slovenia) Alen Omić – Crvena zvezda (2018); Budućnost (2018)
- (Serbia and Montenegro) Luka Pavićević – Budućnost (1984–1985), Crvena zvezda (1995–1996, 1998–1999, 2002–2003)
- (Serbia and Montenegro) Stevan Peković – Budućnost (1990–1992, 1997–1998), Crvena zvezda (1998–1999, 2001–2002)
- (Serbia and Montenegro) Igor Perović – Crvena zvezda (1996–1998); Budućnost (2001–2002)
- (Socialist Federal Republic of Yugoslavia) Ivo Petović – Budućnost (1981–1983); Crvena zvezda (1983–1990)
- (Serbia) Igor Rakočević – Crvena zvezda (1994–2000, 2003–2004, 2012–2013); Budućnost (2000–2002)
- (Serbia) Boris Savović – Budućnost (2009–2010, 2015, 2016–2017); Crvena zvezda (2012–2013)
- (Serbia) Marko Simonović – Budućnost (2008–2011); Crvena zvezda (2012–2014, 2015–2017, 2020–2022)
- (Montenegro) Bojan Subotić – Crvena zvezda (2011–2013); Budućnost (2013–2017)
- (Montenegro) Vujadin Subotić – Budućnost (1999–2000); Crvena zvezda (2004–2006, 2008, 2010–2011)
- (Serbia and Montenegro) Vladimir Tica – Crvena zvezda (1998–2003, 2007); Budućnost (2011–2012)
- (Serbia and Montenegro) Dejan Tomašević – Crvena zvezda (1990–1995); Budućnost (1999–2001)
- (Serbia and Montenegro) Željko Topalović – Crvena zvezda (1997–1998, 1999–2000); Budućnost (1998–1999)
- (Serbia and Montenegro) Milenko Topić – Crvena zvezda (1997–1999); Budućnost (1999–2001)
- (Serbia and Montenegro) Čedomir Vitkovac – Crvena zvezda (2003–2006); Budućnost (2009–2010, 2011–2015)
- (Montenegro) Slavko Vraneš – Budućnost (2001–2003, 2004–2007); Crvena zvezda (2004)
- (United States) Aaron White – Crvena zvezda (2021–2022); Budućnost (2022)
- (United States) Marcus Williams – Crvena zvezda (2014–2015); Budućnost (2016–2017)

The following players have played for one club in youth system career and for rival club in senior career:

- (Serbia) Vladimir Micov – Crvena zvezda (youth system), Budućnost (senior team)

The following players have played for both Crvena zvezda and Partizan in their youth system careers:

- (Serbia) (Montenegro) Andrija Vuković – Budućnost than Crvena zvezda

=== Coaches ===
The following head coaches have coached both Budućnost and Crvena zvezda in their careers:

- (Serbia and Montenegro) Vlade Đurović – Crvena zvezda (1986–1988); Budućnost (2002)
- (Serbia and Montenegro) Momir Milatović – Budućnost (N/A); Crvena zvezda (1999)
- (Serbia and Montenegro) Miroslav Nikolić – Budućnost (1998–2000); Crvena zvezda (2001, 2002)
- (Montenegro) Dejan Radonjić – Budućnost (2005–2013); Crvena zvezda (2013–2017, 2021–2022)

The following assistant coaches have coached both Budućnost and Crvena zvezda in their careers:

- (Serbia) Nikola Birač – Crvena zvezda (2011–2017, 2020–2022); Budućnost (2022–present)

=== Others ===
The following individuals have also played and/or coached both Budućnost and Crvena zvezda in their careers:

- (Montenegro) Duško Ivanović – Budućnost (1980–1987 player); Crvena zvezda (2022–present coach)
- (Serbia and Montenegro) Momir Milatović – Budućnost (N/A player, N/A coach); Crvena zvezda (1999 coach)
- (Serbia) Saša Obradović – Crvena zvezda (1987–1993, 1993–1994, 1999–2000 player; 2020 coach); Budućnost (2000–2001 player)
- (Montenegro) Luka Pavićević – Budućnost (1984–1985 player; 2015–2016 coach), Crvena zvezda (1995–1996, 1998–1999, 2002–2003 player)
- (Serbia and Montenegro) Mihailo Pavićević – Budućnost (1979–1981, 1988–1989 player), Crvena zvezda (1997, 1998 coach)
- (Montenegro) Dejan Radonjić – Budućnost (1991–1993, 1998–2002 player; 2005–2013 coach); Crvena zvezda (2013–2017, 2020–2022 coach)
- (Serbia and Montenegro) Zoran Sretenović – Crvena zvezda (1985–1986, 1995–1996 player), Budućnost (2001–2002 coach)
- (Serbia) Milenko Topić – Crvena zvezda (1997–1999 player; 2018 coach); Budućnost (1999–2001 player)

== Honours ==
The rivalry reflected in derby matches comes about as Budućnost is the most successful basketball club in Montenegro, while Crvena zvezda is the second most successful club in Serbia.

Crvena zvezda	Competition	Budućnost
Domestic Leagues
12	Yugoslavia (defunct)	—
3	Serbia–Montenegro (defunct)	3
7	Serbia / Montenegro	14
22	Aggregate	17
Domestic Cups
3	Yugoslav Cup (defunct)	3
8	Serbia / Montenegro	15
11	Aggregate	18
Adriatic
6	League	1
1	SuperCup	—
7	Aggregate	1
European
1	FIBA Saporta Cup (defunct)	—
1	Aggregate	0
42	Total Aggregate	36

== See also ==
- Crvena Zvezda–Partizan basketball rivalry
- List of sports rivalries
