= Zoran Stevanović (basketball) =

Serbian basketball player

Personal information
- Born: July 3, 1970 (age 56) Kragujevac, SR Serbia, SFR Yugoslavia
- Listed height: 2.06 m (6 ft 9 in)

Career information
- NBA draft: 1992: undrafted
- Playing career: 1990–2004
- Position: Center

Career history
- 1990–1991: Radnički Kragujevac
- 1991–1996: Partizan
- 1996–1998: Beobanka
- 1998–1999: Partizan
- 1999–2000: Prokom Trefl Sopot
- 2000: Achileas
- 2000–2001: Igokea
- 2001–2002: FMP
- 2002–2003: Yambol
- 2003–2004: Radnički Kragujevac

Career highlights
- EuroLeague champion (1992); 3× YUBA League champion (1992, 1995, 1996); 4× FR Yugoslavia Cup winner (1992, 1994, 1995, 1999); Bosnian League champion (2001)

Zoran Stevanović (Serbian Cyrillic: Зоран Стевановић; born July 3, 1970) is a Serbian former professional basketball player. He played at the center position.

== Professional career ==
Stevanović started playing basketball with Radnički Kragujevac before moving to Partizan. With Partizan he stayed till 1996 and helped his team to win the EuroLeague in 1992, and three YUBA League championships and Yugoslav Cups. From 1996 to 1998 he played for Beobanka and then returned to Partizan for the 1998–99 season. During his second stint with Partizan, he has won one more Yugoslav Cup. During the 1999–00 season, he played for Prokom Trefl Sopot and Achileas. For the 2000–01 season, he moved to Igokea and helped them to win their first-ever Bosnian League championship. He later played for FMP and Yambol before finishing his basketball career in 2004 with his hometown club Radnički Zastava.
