= Milan Marinković =

Bosnian basketball player and coach

Personal information
- Born: August 11, 1968 (age 58) Prnjavor, SFR Yugoslavia
- Listed height: 6 ft 7 in (2.01 m)

Career information
- NBA draft: 1990: undrafted
- Playing career: 1988–2005
- Position: Small forward
- Number: 13, 8

Career history

Playing
- 1989–1991: Maribor
- 1991–1993: Crvena zvezda
- 1995–1997: BFC Beočin
- 2002–2003: Igokea
- 2004–2005: Sokolac

Coaching
- 2014–2015: Prnjavor 76
- 2015: KK Derventa

Career highlights
- YUBA League champion (1993)

Milan "Mile" Marinković (Serbian Cyrillic: Милан Маринковић; born August 11, 1968) is a Bosnian professional basketball coach and former player.

== Playing career ==
Marinković played for the Crvena zvezda and BFC Beočin of the Yugoslav League. In 1992–93 season, he won the Yugoslav League with Crvena zvezda and played together with Dragoljub Vidačić, Nebojša Ilić, Saša Obradović, Mileta Lisica, Predrag Stojaković, Rastko Cvetković, Aleksandar Trifunović and Dejan Tomašević. During stint with BFC he played the 1995–96 FIBA Korać Cup season. Over two cup games, he averaged 7.5 points and 0.5 rebounds per game.

Marinković played for Bosnian teams such as Igokea and Sokolac. He played for Igokea at 2002–03 season of FIBA Europe Regional Challenge Cup – Conference South.

== Career achievements and awards ==
- Yugoslav League champion: 1 (with Crvena zvezda: 1992–93)
