= 1994–95 YUBA League =

3rd edition of YUBA League

- League: YUBA League
- Season: 1994–95
- Dates: 22 October 1994 – 24 December 1994 (Regular season)
- Games played: 28 each
- Teams: 32

Regular season
- Top seed: Partizan, 24–4

Finals
- Champions: Partizan
- Runners-up: TG Borovica

Seasons
- ← 1993–94 1995–96 →

The 1994–95 YUBA League (Serbian Cyrillic: ЈУБА лига 1994/95.) was the third season of the YUBA League, the top-tier professional basketball league in Yugoslavia (later renamed to Serbia and Montenegro).

== Teams ==
A total of 32 teams participated in the 1994–95 YUBA League.

=== Venues and locations ===
Location of clubs in the 1994–95 season
Location of a club in Republike Srpska in the 1994–95 season

Club	Home city	Arena	Capacity
Beobanka	Belgrade		
BFC	Beočin		
Beovuk Bemo	Belgrade	SC Šumice	2,000
Big Enex Metalac	Valjevo	Valjevo Sports Hall	1,500
Bobanik	Kraljevo	Kraljevo Sports Hall	3,350
Borac Čačak	Čačak	Borac Hall	3,000
Borac Nektar	Banja Luka, R Srpska	Borik Sports Hall	3,060
Budućnost	Podgorica	Morača Hall	4,300
Crvena zvezda	Belgrade	Pionir Hall	5,878
Fagar	Kosovo Polje		
Ibon Nikšić	Nikšić	Nikšić Sports Center	3,000
Iva Omega	Šabac	Zorka Hall	2,300
Jugotes TNN	Bijelo Polje		
Lovćen	Cetinje	Lovćen Sports Center	1,500
Mornar VOLI	Bar		
Mladost	Zemun	Master Sport Center	750
NAP Novi Sad	Novi Sad	SPC Vojvodina	7,022
Napredak Kruševac	Kruševac	Kruševac Sports Hall	2,500
OKK Beograd	Belgrade	SC Šumice	2,000
OKK Kikinda	Kikinda		
Partizan	Belgrade	Pionir Hall	5,878
Pemont Proleter	Zrenjanin	Crystal Hall	3,000
Kolubara	Lazarevac	SRC Kolubara	1,700
Radnički CIP	Belgrade	SC Šumice	2,000
Radnički Kragujevac	Kragujevac	Jezero Hall	3,750
Raj Banka	Berane		
Spartak	Subotica	Dudova Šuma Hall	3,000
Srem Tifani	Sremska Mitrovica		
Temko	Nikšić	Nikšić Sports Center	3,000
TG Borovica	Ruma	Ruma Sports Center	2,500
Užice	Užice	Veliki Park Hall	2,200
Vojvodina Panšped	Novi Sad	SPC Vojvodina	7,022

=== Personnel and sponsorship ===
Team	Head coach	Captain	Kit manufacturer	Shirt sponsor
Beobanka	(Federal Republic of Yugoslavia) Darko Ruso			
BFC	(Federal Republic of Yugoslavia) Miroslav Nikolić			
Beovuk Bemo	(Federal Republic of Yugoslavia) Milan Lakić			
Big Enex Metalac	(Federal Republic of Yugoslavia) Vojislav Kecojević			
Bobanik	(Federal Republic of Yugoslavia) Veselin Kašćelan			
Borac Čačak	(Federal Republic of Yugoslavia) Slobodan Janković			
Borac Nektar	(Republika Srpska) Slobodan Simović		Nike	Vabeg
Budućnost Demetra	(Federal Republic of Yugoslavia) Goran Bojanić	(Federal Republic of Yugoslavia) Jadran Vujačić		
Crvena zvezda	(Federal Republic of Yugoslavia) Vladislav Lučić / (Federal Republic of Yugoslavia) Veselin Matić / (Federal Republic of Yugoslavia) Zoran Slavnić	(Federal Republic of Yugoslavia) Aleksandar Trifunović	Asics	Sartid
Fagar	(Federal Republic of Yugoslavia) Goran Marković			
Ibon Nikšić	(Federal Republic of Yugoslavia) Dragan Ivković			
Iva Omega	(Federal Republic of Yugoslavia) Milovan Stepandić	(Federal Republic of Yugoslavia) Mijailo Grušanović		
Jugotes TNN	(Federal Republic of Yugoslavia) Goran Vojinović			
Lovćen	(Federal Republic of Yugoslavia) Momir Milatović			
Mornar VOLI	(Federal Republic of Yugoslavia) Mihailo Pavićević	(Federal Republic of Yugoslavia) Đorđije Pavićević		
Mladost	(Federal Republic of Yugoslavia) Jovica Antonić			
NAP Novi Sad	(Federal Republic of Yugoslavia) Aleksandar Kaplarević			
Napredak Kruševac	(Federal Republic of Yugoslavia) Nebojša Raičević			
OKK Beograd	(Federal Republic of Yugoslavia) Igor Kokoškov / (Federal Republic of Yugoslavia) Ivan Jeremić	(Federal Republic of Yugoslavia) Zoran Radović		
OKK Kikinda	(Federal Republic of Yugoslavia) Velimir Gašić			
Partizan	(Federal Republic of Yugoslavia) Borislav Džaković			
Pemont Proleter	(Federal Republic of Yugoslavia) Kosta Jankov			
Kolubara	(Federal Republic of Yugoslavia) Rajko Maravić			
Radnički CIP	(Federal Republic of Yugoslavia) Slobodan Ivković / (Federal Republic of Yugoslavia) Jovica Antonić			
Radnički Kragujevac	(Federal Republic of Yugoslavia) Vojislav Vezović			
Raj Banka	(Federal Republic of Yugoslavia) Nikola Velojić			
Spartak	(Federal Republic of Yugoslavia) Rajko Toroman	(Federal Republic of Yugoslavia) Dragan Aleksić		
Srem Tifani	(Federal Republic of Yugoslavia) Dragan Kecojević	(Federal Republic of Yugoslavia) Ivan Salaj		
Temko	(Federal Republic of Yugoslavia) Mirko Baletić			
TG Borovica	(Federal Republic of Yugoslavia) Zlatan Tomić			
Užice	(Federal Republic of Yugoslavia) Ivan Obućina			
Vojvodina Panšped	(North Macedonia) Janko Lukovski			

== Regular season ==
A total of 32 teams participated in the Regular Season, divided into four groups with 8 clubs. Eight best teams by efficiency (percentage of game winning) from the Regular season (regardless of the position in the group) had formed Superleague, from which all of the teams later automatically qualified to Championship playoffs . The rest of the teams from Regular Season were moved into the three newly formed groups (A, B and C).

It started on 22 October 1994 and ended in on 24 December 1994.

=== Group One ===
Pos	Team	Pld	W	L	PF	PA	PD	Pts	Qualification or relegation
1	Crvena zvezda	0	0	0	0	0	0	0	Qualification to Superleague
2	Pemont Proleter	0	0	0	0	0	0	0	Qualification to Superleague
3	Ibon Nikšić	0	0	0	0	0	0	0	Qualification to Superleague
4	Big Enex Metalac	0	0	0	0	0	0	0	Qualification to Group C
5	Bobanik	0	0	0	0	0	0	0	Qualification to Group A
6	NAP Novi Sad	0	0	0	0	0	0	0	Qualification to Group A
7	Raj Banka Berane	0	0	0	0	0	0	0	Qualification to Group B
8	Temko Nikšić	0	0	0	0	0	0	0	Qualification to Group C

Source: N/A

=== Group Two ===
Pos	Team	Pld	W	L	PF	PA	PD	PCT	Qualification or relegation
1	Partizan	14	14	0	1314	1021	+293	1.000	Qualification to Superleague
2	Mornar VOLI	14	9	5	1163	1125	+38	.643	Qualification to Group C
3	Mladost Srbos	14	9	5	1125	1126	−1	.643	Qualification to Group C
4	Lovćen	14	9	5	1070	1038	+32	.643	Qualification to Group A
5	Jugotes TNN	14	8	6	1225	1156	+69	.571	Qualification to Group B
6	Fagar Kosovo Polje	14	4	10	917	1042	−125	.286	Qualification to Group C
7	Napredak Kruševac	14	2	12	999	1132	−133	.143	Qualification to Group A
8	Borac Nektar	14	1	13	1022	1195	−173	.071	Qualification to Group B

Source: Partizanopedia

=== Group Three ===
Pos	Team	Pld	W	L	PF	PA	PD	PCT	Qualification or relegation
1	BFC	14	11	3	1321	1102	+219	.786	Qualification to Superleague
2	Radnički CIP	14	9	5	1225	1140	+85	.643	Qualification to Group B
3	Iva Omega	14	9	5	1240	1037	+203	.643	Qualification to Group A
4	Borac Čačak	14	8	6	1202	1174	+28	.571	Qualification to Group C
5	OKK Beograd	14	7	7	1124	1128	−4	.500	Qualification to Group A
6	Srem Tifani	14	6	8	1206	1213	−7	.429	Qualification to Group A
7	Beovuk Bemo	14	4	10	1102	1260	−158	.286	Qualification to Group B
8	OKK Kikinda	14	2	12	935	1301	−366	.143	Qualification to Group B

Source: OKK Beograd

=== Group Four ===
Pos	Team	Pld	W	L	PF	PA	PD	Pts	Qualification or relegation
1	TG Borovica	0	0	0	0	0	0	0	Qualification to Superleague
2	Spartak	0	0	0	0	0	0	0	Qualification to Superleague
3	Vojvodina Panšped	0	0	0	0	0	0	0	Qualification to Superleague
4	Beobanka	0	0	0	0	0	0	0	Qualification to Group B
5	Budućnost Demetra	0	0	0	0	0	0	0	Qualification to Group B
6	Kolubara	0	0	0	0	0	0	0	Qualification to Group C
7	Radnički Kragujevac	0	0	0	0	0	0	0	Qualification to Group C
8	Užice	0	0	0	0	0	0	0	Qualification to Group A

Source: N/A

== Second round ==
=== Superleague ===
Pos	Team	Pld	W	L	GF	GA	GD	PCT	Qualification or relegation
1	Partizan	28	24	4	2564	2167	+397	.857	Qualification to Playoffs
2	TG Borovica	28	21	7	2366	2107	+259	.750	Qualification to Playoffs
3	Crvena zvezda	28	20	8	2454	2242	+212	.714	Qualification to Playoffs
4	BFC	28	19	9	2333	2052	+281	.679	Qualification to Playoffs
5	Spartak	28	18	10	2446	2161	+285	.643	Qualification to Playoffs
6	Vojvodina Panšped	28	16	12	2290	2169	+121	.571	Qualification to Playoffs
7	Pemont Proleter	28	15	13	2209	2221	−12	.536	Qualification to Playoffs
8	Ibon Nikšić	28	14	14	2178	2220	−42	.500	Qualification to Playoffs

Source: kosarka.co.yu

=== Group A ===
Pos	Team	Pld	W	L	PF	PA	PD	PCT	Qualification or relegation
1	Iva Omega	28	21	7	0	0	0	.750	Qualification to Playoffs
2	Jugotes TNN	28	18	10	0	0	0	.643	
3	OKK Beograd	28	16	12	0	0	0	.571	
4	Srem Tifani	28	15	13	0	0	0	.536	
5	Bobanik	28	13	15	0	0	0	.464	
6	NAP Novi Sad	28	9	19	0	0	0	.321	
7	Napredak Kruševac	28	5	23	0	0	0	.179	Relegated
8	Užice	28	2	26	0	0	0	.071	Relegated

Source: BORBA, 1995

=== Group B ===
Pos	Team	Pld	W	L	PF	PA	PD	PCT	Qualification or relegation
1	Radnički CIP	28	20	8	0	0	0	.714	Qualification to Playoffs
2	Beobanka	28	19	9	0	0	0	.679	Qualification to Playoffs
3	Budućnost Demetra	28	17	11	0	0	0	.607	
4	Mladost Srbos	28	15	13	0	0	0	.536	
5	Beovuk Bemo	28	10	18	0	0	0	.357	
6	OKK Kikinda	28	7	21	0	0	0	.250	
7	Raj Banka Berane	28	7	21	0	0	0	.250	Relegated
8	Borac Nektar	28	5	23	0	0	0	.179	Relegated

Source: BORBA, 1995

=== Group C ===
Pos	Team	Pld	W	L	PF	PA	PD	PCT	Qualification or relegation
1	Mornar VOLI	28	19	9	0	0	0	.679	Qualification to Playoffs
2	Borac Čačak	28	19	9	0	0	0	.679	
3	Lovćen	28	19	9	0	0	0	.679	
4	Kolubara	28	15	13	0	0	0	.536	
5	Big Enex Metalac	28	14	14	0	0	0	.500	
6	Fagar Kosovo Polje	28	8	20	0	0	0	.286	
7	Temko Nikšić	28	5	23	0	0	0	.179	Relegated
8	Radnički Kragujevac	28	4	24	0	0	0	.143	Relegated

Source: BORBA, 1995

== Playoffs ==
In this season, 12 teams qualified to the playoffs (8 teams from the Superleague and 4 best placed teams from the other competition groups - Iva Omega, Radnički CIP, Mornar VOLI and Beobanka).

=== Bracket ===
First round
Ibon Nikšić	0
Iva Omega	2
Spartak	2
Beobanka	0
Pemont Proleter	2
Radnički CIP	1
Vojvodina Panšped	2
Mornar VOLI	0

Quarterfinals
Partizan	2
Iva Omega	0
BFC	1
Spartak	2
TG Borovica	2
Pemont Proleter	0
Crvena zvezda	2
Vojvodina Panšped	1

Semifinals
Partizan	2
Spartak	0
TG Borovica	2
Crvena zvezda	0

Finals
Partizan	4
TG Borovica	1

=== Semifinals ===
Team 1	Series	Team 2	Game 1	Game 2	Game 3
Partizan	2–0	Spartak	74–66	104–75	
TG Borovica	2–0	Crvena zvezda	80–79	70–62	

=== Finals ===
Team 1	Series	Team 2	Game 1	Game 2	Game 3	Game 4	Game 5
Partizan	4–1	TG Borovica	99–82	70–59	73–77	82–74	59–56

== Clubs in European competitions ==
Following the adoption of economic sanctions by the international community against FR Yugoslavia, clubs were banned to compete in the European professional club basketball system.

== See also ==
- 1994–95 ACB season
- 1994–95 Slovenian Basketball League
