= 1996–97 YUBA League =

5th edition of YUBA League

1996–97 Winston YUBA League
- League: YUBA League
- Season: 1996–97
- Games played: 26 each
- Teams: 14

Regular season
- Top seed: Partizan, 20–6

Finals
- Champions: Partizan
- Runners-up: FMP Železnik

Seasons
- ← 1995–96 1997–98 →

The 1996–97 Winston YUBA League (Serbian Cyrillic: Винстон ЈУБА лига 1996/97.) was the 5th season of the YUBA League, the top-tier professional basketball league in Yugoslavia (later renamed to Serbia and Montenegro).

== Teams ==
A total of 14 teams participated in the 1996–97 Winston YUBA League.

=== Distribution ===
The following is the access list for this season.

Access list for the 1996–97 Winston YUBA League
| | Teams entering in this round | Teams advancing from the previous round |
|---|---|---|
| Regular season (14 teams) | 12 highest-placed teams from the last season; 2 highest-placed teams from the B League | |
| Playoffs (8 teams) | | 8 highest-placed teams from the Regular season |

=== Promotion and relegation ===
Teams promoted from the YUBA B League

- Borac Čačak
- Vojvodina

Teams relegated to the YUBA B League

- None, league extension with two clubs more.

=== Venues and locations ===
Location of clubs in the 1997–98 season

| Club | Home city | Arena | Capacity |
|---|---|---|---|
| Beobanka | Belgrade | New Belgrade Sports Hall | 5,000 |
| BFC | Beočin | | |
| Borac Čačak | Čačak | Borac Hall | 3,000 |
| Borovica | Ruma | Ruma Sports Center | 2,500 |
| Budućnost | Podgorica | Morača Hall | 4,300 |
| Crvena zvezda | Belgrade | Pionir Hall | 5,878 |
| FMP Železnik | Belgrade | Železnik Hall | 3,000 |
| Iva Zorka Pharma | Šabac | Zorka Hall | 2,300 |
| Lovćen | Cetinje | Lovćen Sports Center | 1,500 |
| Mornar Primorka | Bar | | |
| Partizan Inex | Belgrade | Pionir Hall | 5,878 |
| Radnički CIP | Belgrade | SC Šumice | 2,000 |
| Spartak | Subotica | Dudova Šuma Hall | 3,000 |
| Vojvodina | Novi Sad | SPC Vojvodina | 7,022 |

=== Personnel and sponsorship ===
| Club | Head coach | Captain | Kit manufacturer | Shirt sponsor |
|---|---|---|---|---|
| Beobanka | Darko Ruso | | Sportstar | Beobanka |
| BFC | Goran Miljković | | | |
| Borac Čačak | | | | |
| Borovica | | | | |
| Budućnost | | | Nike | |
| Crvena zvezda | Mihailo Pavićević / Ranko Žeravica | | Nike | Delta Banka |
| FMP Železnik | Momir Milatović | | | |
| Iva Zorka | Dragan Vuković | Mijailo Grušanović | | |
| Lovćen | Miodrag Kadija | | | |
| Mornar | Đorđije Pavićević | | | |
| Partizan Inex | Miroslav Nikolić | | Nike | |
| Radnički CIP | | | | |
| Spartak | Rajko Toroman | | | |
| Vojvodina | (North Macedonia) Janko Lukovski | | | |

== Regular season ==
=== Standings ===
| Pos | Team | Pld | W | L | PF | PA | PD | Pts | Qualification or relegation | PAR | BBA | FMP | BUD | BFC | SPA | MOR | LOV | BRU | IVA | RAD | CZV | BOR | VOJ |
|---|---|---|---|---|---|---|---|---|---|---|---|---|---|---|---|---|---|---|---|---|---|---|---|
| 1 | Partizan Inex | 26 | 20 | 6 | 2166 | 1859 | +307 | 46 | Qualification to Playoffs | — | 73–58 | 69–68 | 80–66 | 68–69 | 104–71 | 96–56 | 65–87 | 99–80 | 84–70 | 89–47 | 98–71 | 98–77 | 100–69 |
| 2 | Beobanka | 26 | 19 | 7 | 2059 | 1901 | +158 | 45 | Qualification to Playoffs | 70–67 | — | | | 64–76 | 78–69 | 96–59 | 81–78 | | 67–75 | | | | 89–78 |
| 3 | FMP Železnik | 26 | 18 | 8 | 1993 | 1855 | +138 | 44 | Qualification to Playoffs | 61–76 | 61–78 | — | 83–78 | 83–81 | 86–72 | 70–67 | 67–58 | | 72–67 | 75–65 | 73–65 | 95–70 | 80–71 |
| 4 | Budućnost | 26 | 17 | 9 | 2049 | 1925 | +124 | 43 | Qualification to Playoffs | 83–70 | 77–67 | 69–67 | — | | 100–76 | 88–71 | 81–71 | 85–73 | 84–74 | 83–70 | 94–84 | 97–95 | 84–65 |
| 5 | BFC | 26 | 17 | 9 | 1987 | 1852 | +135 | 42 | Qualification to Playoffs | 75–74 | | | 73–85 | — | 81–90 | 100–77 | 76–70 | 99–71 | 78–68 | 89–73 | 94–77 | 66–63 | 78–71 |
| 6 | Spartak | 26 | 14 | 12 | 2042 | 2080 | −38 | 40 | Qualification to Playoffs | 87–75 | 92–89 | | | 82–89 | — | 70–65 | 63–52 | 84–67 | 81–79 | 79–69 | 76–74 | 87–74 | 83–79 |
| 7 | Mornar Primorka | 26 | 13 | 13 | 1952 | 2089 | −137 | 39 | Qualification to Playoffs | 67–92 | 69–65 | | 76–74 | 86–79 | | — | | 71–70 | | 108–105 | | 89–82 | |
| 8 | Lovćen | 26 | 12 | 14 | 1840 | 1872 | −32 | 38 | Qualification to Playoffs | 76–79 | 70–78 | | | 78–66 | 74–75 | 65–63 | — | 83–73 | 65–56 | 82–81 | 75–55 | 74–71 | 81–77 |
| 9 | Borovica | 26 | 11 | 15 | 2081 | 2190 | −109 | 37 | | 78–92 | 94–87 | 90–100 | 83–74 | 69–62 | | 83–78 | 91–66 | — | 90–74 | 71–73 | 84–101 | 98–93 | 95–84 |
| 10 | Iva Zorka Pharma | 26 | 11 | 15 | 2060 | 2031 | +29 | 37 | | 92–98 | | 68–65 | 95–86 | 97–89 | | 85–74 | 82–59 | 101–78 | — | 60–62 | 95–75 | 79–85 | |
| 11 | Radnički CIP | 26 | 11 | 15 | 1956 | 2033 | −77 | 37 | | 57–68 | 84–80 | 92–72 | 55–64 | | 85–88 | 87–62 | 63–54 | | 78–66 | — | 78–63 | 84–69 | 99–85 |
| 12 | Crvena zvezda | 26 | 10 | 16 | 2042 | 2100 | −58 | 36 | | 57–68 | 60–68 | | 79–89 | 83–84 | 81–76 | | 71–61 | | | 92–84 | — | 90–64 | 101–75 |
| 13 | Borac Čačak | 26 | 7 | 19 | 2129 | 2265 | −136 | 33 | Relegation to YUBA B League | 91–99 | | 74–86 | 86–92 | 84–94 | 85–82 | 88–92 | 72–84 | 94–91 | 77–78 | | 98–77 | — | 97–83 |
| 14 | Vojvodina | 26 | 1 | 25 | 1902 | 2206 | −304 | 27 | Relegation to YUBA B League | 77–86 | 56–72 | 69–72 | 77–83 | 61–99 | 81–79 | 78–79 | 68–73 | 69–71 | 61–77 | 80–90 | 79–93 | 82–84 | — |

Source: kosarka.co.yu

== Playoffs ==
=== Bracket ===
Quarterfinals
Partizan Inex | 2
Lovćen | 0
Budućnost | 2
BFC Beočin | 1
Beobanka | 2
Mornar | 0
FMP Železnik | 2
Spartak | 0

Semifinals
Partizan Inex | 2
Budućnost | 1
Beobanka | 1
FMP Železnik | 2

Finals
Partizan Inex | 3
FMP Železnik | 1

=== Quarterfinals ===
| Team 1 | Series | Team 2 | Game 1 | Game 2 | Game 3 |
|---|---|---|---|---|---|
| Partizan Inex | 2-0 | Lovćen | 93-63 | 72-66 | |
| Beobanka | 2-0 | Mornar | 89-68 | 84-70 | |
| FMP Železnik | 2-0 | Spartak | 81-80 | 88-67 | |
| Budućnost | 2-1 | BFC Beočin | 74-95 | 81-80 | |

=== Semifinals ===
| Team 1 | Series | Team 2 | Game 1 | Game 2 | Game 3 |
|---|---|---|---|---|---|
| Partizan Inex | 2-1 | Budućnost | 87-89 | 53-104 | 89-80 |
| Beobanka | 1-2 | FMP Železnik | 64-70 | 87-73 | 78-87 |

=== Finals ===
| Team 1 | Series | Team 2 | Game 1 | Game 2 | Game 3 | Game 4 | Game 5 |
|---|---|---|---|---|---|---|---|
| Partizan Inex | 3–1 | FMP Železnik | 80–66 | 76–82 | 72–51 | 88–84 | — |

== Clubs in European competitions ==
| Competition | Team | Progress | Result |
|---|---|---|---|
| EuroLeague | Partizan Inex | Top 16 | Eliminated by (Greece) Olympiacos, 2–1 |
| FIBA EuroCup | BFC | Round of 32 | Eliminated by (Italy) Mash Jeans Verona, 161–168 (0–2) |
| FIBA EuroCup | Budućnost | Group stage – Group H | 5th (3–7) |
| FIBA Korać Cup | Crvena zvezda | Round of 32 | Eliminated by (Greece) PAOK, 186–202 (0–2) |
| FIBA Korać Cup | Iva Zorka Pharma | Round of 32 | Eliminated by (Poland) Mazowzanka, 165–176 (1–1) |
| FIBA Korać Cup | Beobanka | Round of 16 | Eliminated by (Greece) Aris, 138–141 (1–1) |
| FIBA Korać Cup | Spartak | Regular season – Group I | 3rd (3–3) |

== All-Star Game ==
The 1997 YUBA All-Star Game took place this season.

== See also ==
- 1996–97 ACB season
- 1996–97 Slovenian Basketball League
