= 2000–01 Yugoslav Basketball Cup =

2001 Yugoslav Cup
Tournament details
- Country: FR Yugoslavia
- City: Vršac
- Venue(s): Millennium Centar
- Dates: 5–8 April 2001
- Teams: 8
- Defending champions: Partizan ICN

Final positions
- Champions: Budućnost
- Runner-up: Partizan ICN
- Semifinalists: FMP Železnik; Lovćen osiguranje

Tournament statistics
- Matches played: 7
- Scoring leader(s): (Federal Republic of Yugoslavia) Miroslav Berić

Awards
- MVP: (Federal Republic of Yugoslavia) Dejan Tomašević

The 2000–01 Yugoslav Basketball Cup was the 36th season of the Yugoslav men's national basketball cup tournament. The tournament was held in Vršac from 5–8 April 2001.

== Venue ==
Vršac	2000–01 Yugoslav Basketball Cup (Serbia and Montenegro)
Millennium Center	2000–01 Yugoslav Basketball Cup (Serbia and Montenegro)
Capacity: 6,987	2000–01 Yugoslav Basketball Cup (Serbia and Montenegro)

== Qualified teams ==
YUBA League	Local Cups
Budućnost; FMP Železnik; Lovćen osiguranje Hemofarm; Partizan ICN; NIS Vojvodina; Zdravlje	N/A (Cup of Serbia Winner); Mogren (Cup of Montenegro Winner)

== Bracket ==
Quarterfinals
5 April
Budućnost	64
Hemofarm	63
6 April
Lovćen osiguranje	73
NIS Vojvodina	70
6 April
Partizan ICN	69
Mogren	48
6 April
FMP Železnik	93
Zdravlje	86

Semifinals
7 April
Budućnost	76
Lovćen osiguranje	74
7 April
Partizan ICN	83
FMP Železnik	75

Final
8 April
Budućnost	87
Partizan ICN	72

== Quarterfinals ==
5 April 2003
20:30

Budućnost	64–63	Hemofarm
Scoring by quarter: 22–26, 12–14, 12–12, 18–11
Pts: Milenko Topić 12		Pts: Aleksandar Zečević 17

Millennium Center, Vršac
Attendance: 4,000
Referees: Bubalo, Nešković

6 April 2003
15:00

Lovćen osiguranje	73–70	NIS Vojvodina
Scoring by quarter: 21–10, 13–22, 18–19, 21–19
Pts: Ivanović 17		Pts: Zlatko Bolić 32

Millennium Center, Vršac
Attendance: 800
Referees: Ilija Belošević, Mrdak

6 April 2003
17:30

FMP Železnik	93–86	Zdravlje
Scoring by quarter: 27–28, 19–19, 21–11, 26–28
Pts: Vladimir Radmanović 25		Pts: Marković 15

Millennium Center, Vršac
Referees: Milojković, Jovanović

6 April 2003
20:00

Partizan ICN	69–48	Mogren
Scoring by quarter: 21–17, 9–13, 26–6, 13–12
Pts: Ratko Varda 22		Pts: Boričić 13

Millennium Center, Vršac
Attendance: 3,000
Referees: Šutulović, Jovanović

== Semifinals ==
7 April 2003
17:30

Report

Partizan ICN	83–75	FMP Železnik
Scoring by quarter: 17–26, 19–16, 24–20, 23–13
Pts: Miroslav Berić 36		Pts: Nenad Pištoljević 21

Millennium Center, Vršac
Attendance: 3,000
Referees: Ilija Belošević, Milojković

7 April 2003
20:30

Report

Budućnost	76–74	Lovćen osiguranje
Scoring by quarter: 28–19, 11–20, 13–15, 24–20
Pts: Igor Rakočević 22		Pts: Đukanović 15

Millennium Center, Vršac
Attendance: 3,000
Referees: Bubalo, Vojinović

== Final ==
27 April 2003
21:00

Report

Budućnost	87–72	Partizan ICN
Scoring by quarter: 29–19, 21–20, 16–21, 21–12
Pts: Dejan Tomašević 21		Pts: Miroslav Berić 27

Millennium Center, Vršac
Attendance: 4,000
Referees: Bubalo, Nešković

== See also ==
- 2000–01 YUBA League
