= Petar Rodić =

Serbian basketball coach

Personal information
- Born: June 23, 1959 (age 67) Belgrade, FPR Yugoslavia
- Position: Head coach
- Coaching career: 1978–present

Career history

Coaching
- 1978–1979: OKK Dunav (youth)
- 1979–1985: Dunav
- 1985–1986: Lifam Stara Pazova
- 1986–1987: Partizan (assistant)
- 1987–1988: Mladost Zemun
- 1988–1991: Lifam Stara Pazova
- 1991–1992: Užice
- 1992–1993: Partizan (youth)
- 1994–1995: Raj banka Berane
- 1995–1996: Klik Arilje
- 1996–1997: Radnički Zastava
- 1998–1999: Yugoslavia Cadets
- 1999–2002: Hemofarm (youth)
- 2001: Yugoslavia Uni. (assistant)
- 2003: China U19
- 2004–2005: Serbia-Montenegro U16
- 2007: Leotar Trebinje
- 2011–2013: Khimik (assistant)
Medals
Men's basketball
Head Coach for FR Yugoslavia
FIBA Europe Under-16 Championship
| Gold medal – first place | 1999 Slovenia | Cadet Team |
Assistant Coach for FR Yugoslavia
Summer Universiade
| Gold medal – first place | 2001 Belgrade | Team |

Petar Rodić (Serbian Cyrillic: Петар Родић; born June 23, 1959) is a Serbian basketball coach.

== Early life ==
Rodić started to play basketball for OKK Dunav, the club where he was one of the founding members. In 1979, he retired due to injury. Rodić earned his degree in physical culture from the University of Novi Sad.

== Coaching career ==
In 1979, Rodić became head coach for Dunav. In 1985, he sign for KK Lifam, based in Stara Pazova. In 1986, Rodić joined the Partizan coaching staff as an assistant coach. He won Yugoslav League championship in the 1986–87 season. In the late-1980s and during 1990s, Rodić had coaching stints in Mladost Zemun, Lifam, Užice, Raj banka Berane, Klik Arilje and Radnički Zastava.

Rodić coached the Yugoslavia cadet team that won the gold medal at the 1999 European Championship for Cadets. Two years later, he was an assistant coach for the Yugoslavia university team that won the gold medal at the 2001 Summer Universiade in Beijing, China. In 2007, he became the head coach for Bosnian team Leotar Trebinje. In 2011, Rodić joined the Khimik coaching staff as an assistant coach.
