= Milatović =

Milatović is a surname of South Slavic origin. Notable people with the surname include:

- Jakov Milatović (born 1986), Montenegrin politician and economist, 3rd President of Montenegro
- Momir Milatović (born 1955), Montenegrin basketball coach and player
- Veljko Milatović (1921–2004), Montenegrin partisan, politician and statesman
- Vicko Milatović (born 1959), Serbian musician
