= Igor Perović =

Serbian basketball player and coach

Personal information
- Born: 3 March 1974 (age 52) Belgrade, SR Serbia, SFR Yugoslavia
- Listed height: 1.94 m (6 ft 4 in)

Career information
- NBA draft: 1996: undrafted
- Playing career: 1991–2008
- Position: Shooting guard

Career history

Playing
- 1991–1993: Partizan
- 1993–1996: Radnički
- 1996–1998: Crvena zvezda
- 1998–2000: Beopetrol
- 2000: Gravelines
- 2001: Beopetrol
- 2001: Hapoel Holon
- 2001–2002: Budućnost
- 2002–2003: Elitzur Kiryat Ata
- 2003–2004: s.Oliver Würzburg
- 2004: Lavovi 063
- 2004–2005: s.Oliver Würzburg
- 2005–2008: Walter Tigers Tübingen

Coaching
- 2009–2015: Walter Tigers Tübingen

Career highlights
- EuroLeague champion (1992); Yugoslav League 1992; Yugoslav Cup (1982); YUBA League (1998)

Igor Perović (Cyrillic: Игор Перовић; born 3 March 1974) is a German basketball coach and former basketball player of Serbian descent.

== Professional career ==
While playing for Partizan, Perović won the 1992 Euroleague.
