= Rade Lisica =

Slovenian basketball player

Free agent
- Position: Center

Personal information
- Born: April 8, 1997 (age 29) Celje, Slovenia
- Listed height: 2.09 m (6 ft 10 in)

Career information
- NBA draft: 2019: undrafted
- Playing career: 2014–present

Career history
- 2014–2016: Zlatorog Laško
- 2016–2017: Sixt Primorska
- 2017–2018: LHT Castings Škofja
- 2018: Terme Olimia Podčetrtek
- 2019: Vojvodina

Rade Lisica (born April 8, 1997) is a Slovenian-Serbian professional basketball player.

== Professional career ==
Lisica played for Slovenian teams Zlatorog Laško, Sixt Primorska and LHT Castings Škofja. In February 2019, he joined Serbian team Vojvodina of the Basketball League of Serbia.

== Personal life ==
His father is a former Serbian professional basketball player Mileta Lisica. Also, his younger brother Đorđe (born 1999) is a basketball player.
