= 1995–96 YUBA League =

2th edition of YUBA League

1995–96 Sportstar YUBA League
- League: YUBA League
- Season: 1995–96

Regular season
- Top seed: Partizan, 27–9

Finals
- Champions: Partizan
- Runners-up: BFC

Seasons
- ← 1994–95 1996–97 →

The 1995–96 Sportstar YUBA League (Serbian Cyrillic: ЈУБА лига 1995/96.) was the 4th season of the YUBA League, the top-tier professional basketball league in Yugoslavia (later renamed to Serbia and Montenegro).

== Competition system ==
As in previous season, Regular season was made of 32 teams divided into 4 groups with 8 teams each. Twelve best teams by efficiency (percentage of game winning) from the Regular season (regardless of the position in the group) formed Superleague, from which first 8 teams advanced to Championship playoffs. All remaining teams from regular season continued competition in Consolation groups (A and B), from which only winners and runner-ups of each league would compete in the qualifications for the next 1996-97 YUBA League.

== Regular season ==
=== Group One ===
| Pos | Team | Pld | W | L | PF | PA | PD | PCT | Qualification or relegation | PAR | BUD | IVA | OKK | IBO | NAP | KOS | WBN |
|---|---|---|---|---|---|---|---|---|---|---|---|---|---|---|---|---|---|
| 1 | Partizan Inex | 14 | 12 | 2 | 1321 | 1102 | +219 | .857 | Qualification to Superleague | — | 103–97 | 76–61 | 110–103 | 95–62 | 106–82 | 109–84 | 102–53 |
| 2 | Budućnost | 14 | 11 | 3 | 1225 | 1140 | +85 | .786 | Qualification to Superleague | 86–95 | — | 75–65 | 91–81 | 104–96 | 89–84 | 86–65 | 94–69 |
| 3 | Iva Kormilo | 14 | 10 | 4 | 1240 | 1037 | +203 | .714 | Qualification to Superleague | 89–69 | 92–82 | — | 94–87 | | 100–84 | 101–82 | 116–63 |
| 4 | OKK InvestEksport | 14 | 8 | 6 | 1202 | 1174 | +28 | .571 | | 85–83 | 79–102 | 64–81 | — | 79–75 | 93–74 | 99–76 | 75–68 |
| 5 | Ibon | 14 | 6 | 8 | 1124 | 1128 | −4 | .429 | | 79–82 | 82–94 | 74–73 | 85–86 | — | | 89–70 | 86–60 |
| 6 | NAP Novi Sad | 14 | 6 | 8 | 1206 | 1213 | −7 | .429 | | 79–99 | 85–88 | 90–86 | 97–90 | 85–73 | — | 90–68 | 107–75 |
| 7 | Fagar Kosovo Polje | 14 | 3 | 11 | 1102 | 1260 | −158 | .214 | | 86–91 | | 64–101 | 67–85 | 78–83 | 93–89 | — | |
| 8 | Winer Broker Niš | 14 | 0 | 14 | 935 | 1301 | −366 | .000 | | 74–101 | 64–74 | 64–88 | 72–96 | | 65–84 | | — |

Source: OKK Beograd

=== Group Two ===
| Pos | Team | Pld | W | L | PF | PA | PD | PCT | Qualification or relegation | BRU | RAD | BVU | PRO | MAŠ | IMT | SRE | JUG |
|---|---|---|---|---|---|---|---|---|---|---|---|---|---|---|---|---|---|
| 1 | Borovica | 14 | 10 | 4 | 1234 | 1100 | +134 | .714 | Qualification to Superleague | — | | | | | | | |
| 2 | Radnički CIP | 14 | 9 | 5 | 1154 | 1088 | +66 | .643 | Qualification to Superleague | | — | | | | | | |
| 3 | Beovuk Bemo | 14 | 8 | 6 | 1115 | 1116 | −1 | .571 | | | | — | | | | | |
| 4 | Proleter | 14 | 6 | 8 | 1028 | 1029 | −1 | .429 | | | | | — | | | | |
| 5 | Mašinac | 14 | 6 | 8 | 1079 | 1080 | −1 | .429 | | | | | | — | | | |
| 6 | Beopetrol IMT | 14 | 6 | 8 | 1118 | 1204 | −86 | .429 | | | | | | | — | | |
| 7 | Srem Tifani | 14 | 6 | 8 | 1065 | 1061 | +4 | .429 | | | | | | | | — | |
| 8 | Jugotes TNN | 14 | 5 | 9 | 1082 | 1197 | −115 | .357 | | | | | | | | | — |

Source: Eurobasket.com

=== Group Three ===
| Pos | Team | Pld | W | L | PF | PA | PD | PCT | Qualification or relegation | CZV | LOV | FMP | BEO | VOJ | BOB | GOR | MLA |
|---|---|---|---|---|---|---|---|---|---|---|---|---|---|---|---|---|---|
| 1 | Crvena zvezda | 14 | 12 | 2 | 1216 | 987 | +229 | .857 | Qualification to Superleague | — | 79–50 | 76–74 | 76–72 | 88–72 | 90–74 | 110–75 | |
| 2 | Lovćen | 14 | 10 | 4 | 961 | 951 | +10 | .714 | Qualification to Superleague | 55–49 | — | 71–66 | 59–57 | | | 81–74 | 72–55 |
| 3 | FMP Železnik | 14 | 10 | 4 | 1145 | 978 | +167 | .714 | Qualification to Superleague | 64–69 | 71–70 | — | 76–65 | 95–70 | 80–67 | 91–58 | 96–75 |
| 4 | Beobanka | 14 | 9 | 5 | 1192 | 947 | +245 | .643 | Qualification to Superleague | | 90–51 | | — | 76–58 | | 101–51 | 113–72 |
| 5 | Vojvodina | 14 | 7 | 7 | 1109 | 1119 | −10 | .500 | | 76–82 | 74–68 | | 68–84 | — | 74–67 | 114–92 | |
| 6 | Bobanik | 14 | 6 | 8 | 1119 | 1140 | −21 | .429 | | 86–98 | 79–81 | 75–73 | 82–79 | 88–99 | — | 101–77 | 91–76 |
| 7 | Gorštak Kolašin | 14 | 1 | 13 | 1004 | 1314 | −310 | .071 | | | 64–80 | 55–85 | 61–106 | 83–90 | | — | |
| 8 | Mladost Zemun | 14 | 1 | 13 | 1009 | 1319 | −310 | .071 | | | 67–82 | | 66–100 | | | 94–86 | — |

Source: Eurobasket.com

=== Group Four ===
| Pos | Team | Pld | W | L | PF | PA | PD | PCT | Qualification or relegation | BFC | SPA | MOR | KOL | BOR | MET | ZDR | BER |
|---|---|---|---|---|---|---|---|---|---|---|---|---|---|---|---|---|---|
| 1 | BFC Beočin | 14 | 11 | 3 | 1152 | 958 | +194 | .786 | Qualification to Superleague | — | | | | | | | |
| 2 | Spartak | 14 | 11 | 3 | 1186 | 1110 | +76 | .786 | Qualification to Superleague | | — | | | | | | |
| 3 | Mornar Primorka | 14 | 9 | 5 | 1194 | 1100 | +94 | .643 | Qualification to Superleague | | | — | | | | | |
| 4 | Kolubara | 14 | 8 | 6 | 1107 | 1123 | −16 | .571 | | | | | — | | | | |
| 5 | Borac Čačak | 14 | 7 | 7 | 1222 | 1164 | +58 | .500 | | | | | | — | | | |
| 6 | Metalac | 14 | 6 | 8 | 1082 | 1115 | −33 | .429 | | | | | | | — | | |
| 7 | Zdravlje | 14 | 2 | 12 | 1028 | 1172 | −144 | .143 | | | | | | | | — | |
| 8 | Rajbanka Berane | 14 | 2 | 12 | 1087 | 1316 | −229 | .143 | | | | | | | | | — |

Source: Eurobasket.com

== Second stage ==
Results from the regular season were transcluded.

=== Superleague ===
| Pos | Team | Pld | W | L | PF | PA | PD | PCT | Qualification or relegation | PAR | BUD | BFC | IVA | BBA | CZV | SPA | BRU | FMP | RAD | LOV | MOR |
|---|---|---|---|---|---|---|---|---|---|---|---|---|---|---|---|---|---|---|---|---|---|
| 1 | Partizan Inex | 36 | 27 | 9 | 3334 | 2958 | +376 | .750 | Qualification to Playoffs | — | 89–79 | 97–96 | 93–74 | 89–79 | 82–78 | 93–81 | 105–91 | 102–80 | 89–76 | 102–74 | 92–90 |
| 2 | Budućnost | 36 | 26 | 10 | 3097 | 2986 | +111 | .722 | Qualification to Playoffs | 104–99 | — | 69–68 | 63–55 | 77–76 | 72–81 | 101–89 | 101–97 | 83–77 | 80–74 | 87–95 | 82–72 |
| 3 | BFC | 36 | 25 | 11 | 2973 | 2626 | +347 | .694 | Qualification to Playoffs | 92–104 | 98–85 | — | 90–78 | 72–76 | 83–74 | 94–75 | 80–62 | 77–75 | 104–80 | 101–75 | 82–54 |
| 4 | Iva Kormilo | 36 | 25 | 11 | 3122 | 2835 | +287 | .694 | Qualification to Playoffs | 101–90 | 96–87 | 102–101 | — | 75–74 | | 98–87 | 93–103 | 88–69 | 110–97 | 79–57 | 111–96 |
| 5 | Beobanka | 36 | 24 | 12 | 2910 | 2500 | +410 | .667 | Qualification to Playoffs | 95–86 | 75–80 | 70–72 | 67–65 | — | 72–59 | 83–57 | 72–73 | 86–65 | 83–76 | 69–55 | 74–70 |
| 6 | Crvena zvezda | 36 | 23 | 13 | 2945 | 2708 | +237 | .639 | Qualification to Playoffs | 72–63 | 102–113 | 71–80 | 88–89 | 69–74 | — | 79–82 | 81–75 | 86–92 | 61–59 | 76–65 | 84–67 |
| 7 | Spartak | 36 | 22 | 14 | 3000 | 2930 | +70 | .611 | Qualification to Playoffs | 70–101 | 79–74 | | 84–91 | 68–66 | 84–87 | — | 85–69 | 88–79 | 87–76 | | 108–74 |
| 8 | Borovica | 36 | 22 | 14 | 2959 | 2851 | +108 | .611 | Qualification to Playoffs | 82–81 | 77–82 | 79–91 | 72–71 | 56–79 | 76–81 | 83–78 | — | 76–64 | 93–88 | 74–72 | 99–78 |
| 9 | FMP Železnik | 36 | 19 | 17 | 2825 | 2712 | +113 | .528 | | 78–84 | 90–76 | 67–75 | 85–84 | 58–84 | 71–65 | 91–81 | | — | 92–100 | | 85–69 |
| 10 | Radnički CIP | 36 | 16 | 20 | 2956 | 2990 | −34 | .444 | | 109–104 | 94–102 | 71–70 | 88–90 | | 87–92 | | 55–72 | 76–69 | — | 85–68 | 79–86 |
| 11 | Lovćen | 36 | 15 | 21 | 2484 | 2644 | −160 | .417 | | 86–76 | | 61–60 | 50–73 | 77–79 | 65–67 | | 65–80 | | 87–76 | — | 71–51 |
| 12 | Mornar Primorka | 36 | 12 | 24 | 2854 | 3000 | −146 | .333 | | 69–90 | 90–91 | 64–78 | 68–69 | 80–98 | 80–87 | 79–94 | 82–76 | 81–94 | 90–92 | 64–63 | — |

Source: Eurobasket.com

=== Consolation League B ===
| Pos | Team | Pld | W | L | PF | PA | PD | PCT | Qualification or relegation | IBO | OKK | MAŠ | MET | PRO | KOL | JUG | KOS | MLA | GOR |
|---|---|---|---|---|---|---|---|---|---|---|---|---|---|---|---|---|---|---|---|
| 1 | Ibon | 32 | 19 | 13 | 1596 | 1374 | +222 | .594 | Qualification to Playoffs for the 1996-97 YUBA League | — | | | | | | | | | |
| 2 | OKK Beograd | 32 | 19 | 13 | 1422 | 1300 | +122 | .594 | Qualification to Playoffs for the 1996-97 YUBA League | | — | | | | | | | | |
| 3 | Mašinac | 32 | 19 | 13 | 1510 | 1363 | +147 | .594 | | | | — | | | | | | | |
| 4 | Metalac | 32 | 16 | 16 | 1442 | 1453 | −11 | .500 | | | | | — | | | | | | |
| 5 | Proleter | 32 | 16 | 16 | 1442 | 1389 | +53 | .500 | | | | | | — | | | | | |
| 6 | Kolubara | 32 | 16 | 16 | 1324 | 1416 | −92 | .500 | | | | | | | — | | | | |
| 7 | Jugotes TNN | 32 | 14 | 18 | 1553 | 1525 | +28 | .438 | | | | | | | | — | | | |
| 8 | Kosovo Polje | 32 | 13 | 19 | 1500 | 1467 | +33 | .406 | | | | | | | | | — | | |
| 9 | Mladost Zemun | 32 | 7 | 25 | 1320 | 1497 | −177 | .219 | | | | | | | | | | — | |
| 10 | Gorštak Kolašin | 32 | 1 | 31 | 1383 | 1708 | −325 | .031 | | | | | | | | | | | — |

Updated to match(es) played on unknown. Source: OKK Beograd

== Playoffs ==
=== Bracket ===
Quarterfinals
Partizan Inex | 2
Borovica | 0
Iva Kormilo | 1
Beobanka | 2
Budućnost | 2
Spartak | 0
BFC Beočin | 2
Crvena zvezda | 1

Semifinals
Partizan Inex | 2
Beobanka | 0
Budućnost | 0
BFC Beočin | 2

Finals
Partizan Inex | 3
BFC Beočin | 2

=== Quarterfinals ===
| Team 1 | Series | Team 2 | Game 1 | Game 2 | Game 3 |
|---|---|---|---|---|---|
| Partizan Inex | 2-0 | Borovica | 104-91 | 97-92 | |
| Budućnost | 2-0 | Spartak | 87-82 | 103-79 | |
| BFC Beočin | 2-1 | Crvena zvezda | 95-72 | 55-78 | 75-66 |
| Iva Kormilo | 1-2 | Beobanka | 80-73 | 76-83 | 63-66 |

=== Semifinals ===
| Team 1 | Series | Team 2 | Game 1 | Game 2 | Game 3 |
|---|---|---|---|---|---|
| Partizan Inex | 2-0 | Beobanka | 100-89 | 103-84 | |
| Budućnost | 0-2 | BFC | 71-86 | | |

=== Finals ===
| Team 1 | Series | Team 2 | Game 1 | Game 2 | Game 3 | Game 4 | Game 5 |
|---|---|---|---|---|---|---|---|
| Partizan Inex | 3–2 | BFC | 89–93 | 85–89 | 79–63 | 71–69 | 65–56 |

== Clubs in European competitions ==
| Competition | Team | Progress | Result |
|---|---|---|---|
| FIBA European League | Partizan Inex | Second round | Eliminated by (Portugal) Benfica, 159–176 (0–1–1) |
| FIBA European Cup | Spartak | Second round | Eliminated by (Israel) Bnei Herzliya, 155–156 (1–1) |
| FIBA Korać Cup | Crvena zvezda | First round | Eliminated by (Russia) Akvarius Volgograd, 145–150 (1–1) |
| FIBA Korać Cup | BFC | Round of 64 | Eliminated by (Lithuania) Šiauliai, 152–169 (0–2) |
| FIBA Korać Cup | Vojvodina | Round of 32 | Eliminated by (Spain) Festina Andorra, 145–148 (1–1) |
| FIBA Korać Cup | Borovica | Round of 32 | Eliminated by (Greece) Panionios Afisorama, 140–162 (0–2) |

== See also ==
- 1995–96 ACB season
- 1995–96 Slovenian Basketball League
