= KK Novi Sad =

Defunct basketball club in Novi Sad, Serbia

Novi Sad
- Founded: 27 December 1985; 39 years ago
- Dissolved: August 2011; 13 years ago merged into Vojvodina Srbijagas
- History: KK Novi Sad (1985–2011)
- Arena: SPC Vojvodina
- Capacity: 7,022
- Location: Novi Sad, Serbia
- Team colors: Yellow, Blue
- Website: kknovisad.co.rs

Košarkaški klub Novi Sad (Serbian Cyrillic: Кошаркашки клуб Нови Сад), commonly referred to as КK Novi Sad, was a men's professional basketball club based in Novi Sad, Serbia. In their last five seasons, the club played in the Basketball League of Serbia. Their home arena was the SPC Vojvodina.

== History ==
The club participated at the 2003 PBA Invitational Championship in Pasay, organized by the Philippine Basketball Association. They played with FedEx Express, Red Bull Barako, Talk 'N Text Phone Pals, and the Yonsei Eagles in Group A; finished the fourth with a 1–3 record.

In August 2011, the club was merged into Vojvodina Srbijagas. The merger was done to help strengthen the financial position of the clubs.

== Sponsorship naming ==
The club has had several denominations through the years due to its sponsorship:

- NAP Novi Sad: 1994–1997
- Novi Sad Panonska banka: 2007–2011

== Coaches ==
- (Federal Republic of Yugoslavia) Aleksandar Kaplarević (1994–1995)
- (Serbia) Radomir Kisić (2008)
- (Serbia) Nemanja Danilović (2008–2010)
- (Serbia) Siniša Matić (2010–2011)

== Season by season ==
Season	Tier	Division	Pos.	Postseason	W–L	National Cup
1991–92	2	YUG B League	6	—	12–12	N/A
1992–93	2	YUBA B League	N/A	—	N/A	N/A
1993–94	2	YUBA B League	N/A	—	N/A	N/A
1994–95	1	YUBA League	N/A	—	9–19	N/A
1995–96	1	YUBA League	N/A	—	N/A	N/A
1996–97	2	YUBA B League	14	—	14–20	N/A
1997–98			N/A	—	N/A	N/A
1998–99			N/A	—	N/A	N/A
1999–00			N/A	—	N/A	N/A
2000–01			N/A	—	N/A	N/A
2001–02			N/A	—	N/A	N/A
2002–03			N/A	—	N/A	—
2003–04			N/A	—	N/A	—
2004–05	2	BLSM B League	4	—	18–8	—
2005–06	2	BLSM B League	2	—	21–5	—
2006–07	1	BLS First League	5	—	11–11	Quarterfinalist
2007–08	1	BLS First League	7	—	11–11	—
2008–09	1	BLS First League	8	—	12–14	—
2009–10	1	BLS First League	7	—	15–11	—
2010–11	1	BLS First League	7	—	12–14	—

== Notable players ==
Note: Flags indicate national team eligibility at FIBA-sanctioned events. Players may hold other non-FIBA nationalities not displayed.

Criteria

To appear in this section a player must have either:

- Set a club record or won an individual award while at the club
- Played at least one official international match for their national team at any time
- Played at least one official NBA match at any time.

- (Austria) Bogić Vujošević
- (Bosnia and Herzegovina) Marko Šutalo
- (Serbia) Marko Jagodić-Kuridža
- (Serbia) Mileta Lisica
- (Serbia) Nikola Kalinić
- (Serbia and Montenegro) Branko Vukićević
- (Serbia and Montenegro) Milan Gurović
- (Socialist Federal Republic of Yugoslavia) Željko Rebrača
