= Vladimir Kuzmanović =

Serbian basketball player

Personal information
- Born: 31 July 1971 (age 55) Belgrade, SR Serbia, SFR Yugoslavia
- Listed height: 6 ft 5 in (1.96 m)

Career information
- NBA draft: 1993: undrafted
- Playing career: 1991–2006
- Position: Shooting guard

Career history
- 1991–1994: OKK Beograd
- 1994–1997: BFC Beočin
- 1997–1998: Crvena zvezda
- 1998–1999: Beobanka
- 1999–2002: Budućnost Podgorica
- 2002–2003: Spirou Charleroi
- 2003–2004: Apollon Patras
- 2004–2006: Asesoft Ploiesti

Career highlights
- 3× YUBA League champion (1998, 2000, 2001); Yugoslav Cup winner (2001); Belgian League champion (2003); 2× Romanian League champion (2005, 2006); Romanian Cup winner (2006); FIBA Europe Cup champion (2005); FIBA Europe Cup Final Four MVP (2005); Yugoslavian League All-Star (1999); Romanian League All-Star (2005)

Vladimir Kuzmanović (Serbian Cyrillic: Владимир Кузмановић; born 31 July 1971) is a Serbian professional basketball administrator and former player. He played as a guard. His most significant achievement came in 2005, when he won the FIBA Europe Cup with CSU Asesoft Ploiesti and he was selected the Final Four MVP.

== Playing career ==
Vladimir's first professional team was OKK Beograd, where he started playing at the age of 20. He played there for three seasons. Before the 1994–95 season he signed with another Serbian club, BFC Beočin. In his second season there he averaged 12 points per game (ppg). After three seasons in Beočin Vladimir moved to one of the best teams in Yugoslavia, Crvena zvezda. He finished his only season there averaging 8.8 ppg and 2.3 assists in a team that won the Yugoslav League that season.

After only one season in Crvena zvezda, Kuzmanović moved to Beobanka. As the club's main player he finished the season with 14.2 ppg. He also has been selected to the 1999 Yugoslavian All-Star game. After a good personal season in Beobanka, Vladimir signed with Budućnost Podgorica where he stayed for three seasons. With Budućnost he won the Yugoslav League two season in a row in years 2000–2001. The team also won the Yugoslav Cup in 2001.

After three seasons in Budućnost, Vladimir moved for the first time to play out of Yugoslavia. He signed with Belgian club Spirou Charleroi, which he helped to win the Belgian League championship.

Kuzmanović signed in Apollon Patras from Greece for the 2003–04 season. He finished the season with 4.7 ppg.

After a disappointing season in Greece, Vladimir signed with the Romanian club Asesoft Ploiesti. With Asesoft he won the Romanian league back-to-back, also adding the Romanian Cup in 2006. He led the club to its best achievement to date, leading it to win the FIBA Europe Cup in 2005 while getting selected as the MVP of the final four.

== Post-playing career ==
Košarkaški podcast sa Lukom i Kuzmom

YouTube information
- Channel: Košarkaški podcast sa Lukom i Kuzmom
- Years active: 2021–present
- Genre: Basketball
- Subscribers: 83.2 thousand
- Views: 81.1 million
- Last updated: 13 November 2026

In March 2015, Kuzmanović was hired for an administrative executive job at the Serbian Basketball Federation (KSS), under the presidential term of Dragan Đilas. The retired player thus became the director of all Serbia men's national teams, including the full squad, under-20s, under-19s, under-18s, under-17s, under-16s, and university team. Kuzmanović's hiring took place in the wake of the February 2015 KSS electoral delegate assembly, held in Niš during the Serbian Cup final tournament, that saw Đilas re-elected as KSS president and Igor Rakočević elected as one of the vice-presidents, replacing Dejan Bodiroga at the job. It was the newly-elected vice-president Rakočević, put in charge of men's basketball at the KSS, who would hire his former KK Crvena zvezda and KK Budućnost teammate Kuzmanović for the men's teams director job.

In parallel with the KSS job, Kuzmanović worked as a basketball player agent as well as TV pundit on the United Group-owned Sport Klub's EuroLeague broadcasts.

He left the KSS post in September 2017.

In November 2021, Kuzmanović and Luka Spasovski started a basketball-themed podcast named Košarkaški podcast sa Lukom i Kuzmom.
