= KK Lavovi 063 =

Defunct basketball club in Belgrade, Serbia

Lavovi 063
- Dissolved: 2005
- History: KK Astra Banka (?–2001); KK Lavovi 063 (2001–2005)
- Arena: Pinki Hall
- Location: Belgrade, Serbia and Montenegro
- Team colors: Dark Blue and Light Blue

Košarkaški klub Lavovi 063 (Serbian Cyrillic: Кошаркашки клуб Лавови 063), commonly referred to as KK Lavovi 063, was a men's professional basketball club based in Zemun, near Belgrade, Serbia and Montenegro.

The club used to compete in the Serbia and Montenegro League from 2002 to 2005, as well as in the 2004–05 FIBA Europe League.

== Coaches ==
- (Serbia and Montenegro) Dražen Dalipagić (2000–2001)
- (Serbia and Montenegro) Predrag Jaćimović (2001)
- (Serbia and Montenegro) Predrag Badnjarević (2001–2002)
- (Serbia and Montenegro) Milovan Stepandić (2002–2003)
- (Serbia and Montenegro) Predrag Jaćimović (2003)
- (Serbia and Montenegro) Jovica Arsić (2003–2004)
- (Serbia and Montenegro) Jovica Antonić (2005)

== Notable players ==
- (Serbia and Montenegro) Mileta Lisica
- (Serbia and Montenegro) Mijailo Grušanović
- (Serbia and Montenegro) Milivoje Božović
- (Serbia and Montenegro) Saša Bratić
- (Serbia and Montenegro) Vladimir Micov
- (Serbia and Montenegro) Mladen Pantić
- (Serbia and Montenegro) Marko Simonović
- (Canada) Greg Newton
- (Serbia and Montenegro) Strahinja Paunović
- (United States) Chris Carr

== International record ==
Season	Achievement	Notes
FIBA EuroChallenge
2004–05	Qualifying Round	8th in Group D with Dynamo St Petersburg, Khimik, Paris Racing, Hapoel Tel Aviv, EKA AEL Limassol, Iraklis, and Olympia Larissa (2–12)
