= KK BFC Beočin =

Defunct basketball club in Beočin, Serbia

BFC
- Nickname: Plavo-beli (The Blue & Whites)
- Founded: 1970; 55 years ago
- Dissolved: 1997; 28 years ago merged into KK Vojvodina
- History: KK Cement (1970–1989); KK Elkond (1989–1991); KK BFC (1991–1997)
- Location: Beočin, FR Yugoslavia
- Team colors: Blue, White
Home	Away

Košarkaški klub BFC (Serbian Cyrillic: Кошаркашки клуб БФЦ, English: BFC Basketball Club), commonly referred to as KK BFC or simply BFC Beočin, was a men's professional basketball club based in Beočin, Serbia, FR Yugoslavia. The club competed in the top-tier Yugoslav League from 1993 to 1997.

== History ==
The club finished the 1995–96 YUBA League season as the runner-up, lost the Play-off Finals from Partizan. The club also played at the FIBA EuroCup in the 1996–97 season.

In 1997, the club was merged into Vojvodina.

== Head coaches ==
- (Federal Republic of Yugoslavia) Boško Đokić
- (Federal Republic of Yugoslavia) Miroslav Nikolić (1994–1996)
- (Federal Republic of Yugoslavia) Goran Miljković (1996–1997)

== Notable players ==
- (Serbia and Montenegro) Vladimir Kuzmanović
- (Bosnia and Herzegovina) Milan Marinković
- (Serbia and Montenegro) Milenko Topić
- (Serbia and Montenegro) Željko Topalović

Youth system

- (Serbia and Montenegro) Darko Miličić
- (Serbia) Marko Jeremić

== Season by season ==
Season	Tier	Division	Pos.	Postseason	RS	PO	Yugoslav Cup	European competitions		
1993–94	2	YUBA B League	2			N/A	N/A	—		
1994–95	1	YUBA League	4	Semifinalist	19–9	N/A	N/A	—		
1995–96	1	YUBA League	3	Runners-up	25–11	N/A	N/A	3 FIBA Korać Cup	R64	2–2
1996–97	1	YUBA League	5	Quarterfinalist	17–9	N/A	N/A	2 FIBA EuroCup	R32	6–6

== International record ==
Season	Achievement	Notes
FIBA Saporta Cup
1996–97	Round of 32	Eliminated by Mash Jeans Verona, 161–168 (0–2)
FIBA Korać Cup
1995–96	Round of 64	Eliminated by Šiauliai, 152–169 (0–2)
