= Željko Topalović =

Serbian basketball player

Personal information
- Born: March 3, 1972 (age 54) Belgrade, SR Serbia, SFR Yugoslavia
- Listed height: 2.06 m (6 ft 9 in)

Career information
- NBA draft: 1994: undrafted
- Playing career: 1989–2001
- Position: Center
- Number: 10, 15

Career history
- 1989–1991: Prvi Partizan
- 1991–1994: Profikolor
- 1994–1997: BFC Beočin
- 1997–1998: Crvena zvezda
- 1998–1999: Budućnost
- 1999–2000: Crvena zvezda
- 2000–2001: Borac Banja Luka

Career highlights
- 2× YUBA League champion (1998, 1999)
Medals
Men's basketball
Representing Yugoslavia
European Championship for Cadets
Silver medal – second place	1989 Spain	U16 Team

Željko Topalović (Serbian Cyrillic: Жељко Топаловић; born March 3, 1972) is a Serbian hospitality entrepreneur, hotelier, and former professional basketball player.

== Playing career ==
Topalović played for the BFC Beočin in the years when this club was at the top of Yugoslav League and reached the Playoffs Finals in the 1995–96 season. Later he continued his career in the Crvena zvezda and was a member of the great generation that brought the YUBA League title in the 1997–98 season. He also played for the Budućnost and won his second YUBA League title in the 1998–99 season. After that, he returned to the Crvena zvezda. He ended his professional career with the Borac Banja Luka.

== National team career ==
Topalović was a member of the SFR Yugoslavia national cadet team that won the silver medal at the 1989 European Championship for Cadets in Spain. Over five tournament games, he averaged 3.2 points per game. Also, he represented the SFR Yugoslavia national junior team at the 1991 World Championship for Junior Men in Edmonton, Canada. Over eight tournament games, he averaged 7.4 points per game. Yugoslavia took 4th place.

== Post-playing career ==
Topalović owns the Zlatarski Zlatnik Hotel in Nova Varoš, located on the slopes of the Zlatar mountain.

== Career achievements ==
- Yugoslav League champion: 2 (with Crvena zvezda: 1997–98; with Budućnost: 1998–99)

== See also ==
- List of KK Crvena zvezda players with 100 games played
