= Dejan Tomašević =

Serbian basketball player and executive

- Дејан Томашевић
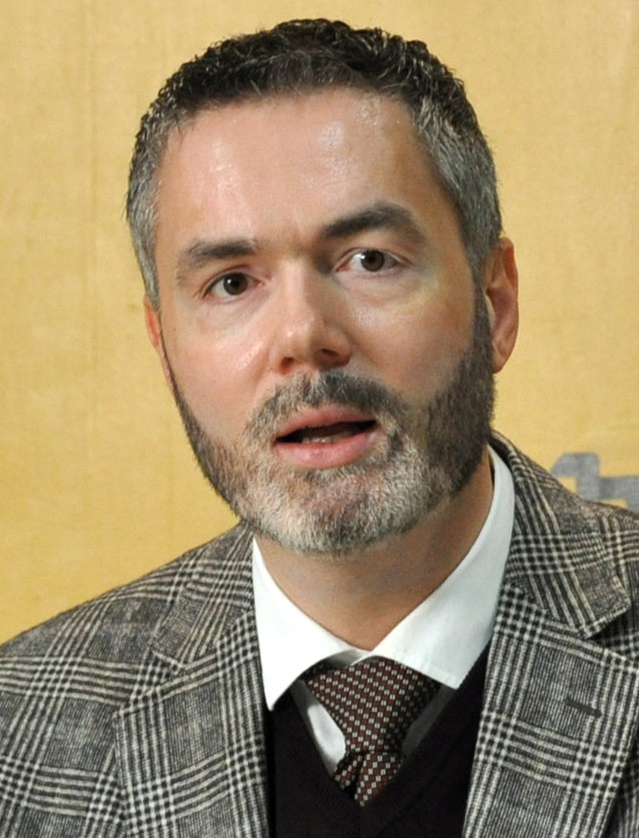
- Tomašević in 2014

President of the Olympic Committee of Serbia (OKS)
- Incumbent
- Assumed office 11 December 2025
- Preceded by: Božidar Maljković

Member of the National Assembly
- In office 6 February 2024 – 9 December 2025

Personal details
- Born: 6 May 1973 (age 53) Belgrade, SR Serbia, SFR Yugoslavia
- Party: SNS (2023–present)
- Basketball career

Personal information
- Listed height: 2.08 m (6 ft 10 in)
- Listed weight: 114 kg (251 lb)

Career information
- NBA draft: 1995: undrafted
- Playing career: 1990–2009
- Position: Center
- Number: 14, 15, 18

Career history
- 1990–1991: Borac Čačak
- 1991–1995: Crvena zvezda
- 1995–1999: Partizan
- 1999–2001: Budućnost Podgorica
- 2001–2002: TAU Cerámica
- 2002–2005: Pamesa Valencia
- 2005–2008: Panathinaikos
- 2008–2009: PAOK

Career highlights
- EuroLeague champion (2007); 2× All-EuroLeague First Team (2001, 2002); EuroLeague Group Stage MVP (2001); ULEB Cup champion (2003); ULEB Cup Finals MVP (2003); 6× Yugoslavian League champion (1993, 1994, 1996, 1997, 2000, 2001); Yugoslavian League MVP (1998); 2× Yugoslavian Cup winner (1999, 2001); Yugoslavian Cup MVP (2001); Spanish League champion (2002); Spanish Cup winner (2002); Spanish Cup MVP (2002); 3× Greek League champion (2006–2008); 3× Greek Cup winner (2006–2008)
Medals
Men's basketball
Representing FR Yugoslavia
Summer Olympic Games
Silver medal – second place	1996 Atlanta	Team
FIBA World Cup
Gold medal – first place	1998 Greece	Team
Gold medal – first place	2002 United States	Team
FIBA Eurobasket
Gold medal – first place	1995 Greece	Team
Gold medal – first place	1997 Spain	Team
Gold medal – first place	2001 Turkey	Team
Bronze medal – third place	1999 France	Team

Dejan Tomašević (Serbian Cyrillic: Дејан Томашевић; born 6 May 1973) is a Serbian professional basketball executive, former player and head of the Olympic Committee of Serbia. He also served as a member of the National Assembly between February 2024 and December 2025. He is a member of the ruling populist Serbian Progressive Party (SNS).

An All-EuroLeague Team selection on two occasions, he played with Borac Čačak, Crvena zvezda, Partizan, Budućnost Podgorica, TAU Cerámica, Pamesa Valencia, Panathinaikos, and PAOK, which he joined in September 2008.

== Professional career ==
Tomašević started his career in 1990 with Crvena zvezda, where he stayed for 5 years, winning 2 Yugoslavian League championship titles. His next teams were Partizan (1995–99), where he won 2 Yugoslavian League championships and one Yugoslavian Cup title, and Budućnost Podgorica (1999–01), where he won 2 more Yugoslavian League championships and one Yugoslavian Cup trophy. The big transfer abroad for his career was realized when he signed with TAU Cerámica, where he played the 2001–02 season, where he won the Spanish ACB League and the Spanish King's Cup in 2002. He then transferred to Pamesa Valencia, where he won the ULEB Cup (now called EuroCup) in 2003, and finally on to Panathinaikos, where he won 3 Greek League championships and 3 Greek Cups, in the years 2006, 2007, 2008, and the Triple Crown in 2007. In September 2008, he signed a one-year contract with PAOK.

He was voted the EuroLeague Regular Season MVP of the EuroLeague 2000–01 season, and he made the All-EuroLeague First Team that same year, as well as the All-EuroLeague First Team of the EuroLeague 2001–02 season. He was also the MVP of the Yugoslavian League in 1998. He was also named the ULEB Cup Finals MVP of the 2002–03 season.

== National team career ==
Tomašević was a member of the FR Yugoslavia national team (representing FR Yugoslavia) that won the gold medal at EuroBasket 1995 in Athens, Greece. Over three tournament games, he averaged 3.3 points and 3.0 rebounds per game. He was also a member of the FR Yugoslav Olympic team that won the silver medal at the 1996 Summer Olympics in Atlanta, Georgia, US. Over six tournament games, he averaged 6.2 points, 4.0 rebounds and 1.2 assists per game. Tomašević won the back-to-back gold medal at EuroBasket 1997 in Spain. Over eight tournament games, he averaged 4.5 points, 3.4 rebounds and 0.4 assists per game. He was also a member of the FR Yugoslavia team that won the gold medal at the 1998 FIBA World Championship in Greece. Over eight tournament games, he averaged 6.2 points, 5.7 rebounds and 0.9 assists per game.

Tomašević won the bronze medal at EuroBasket 1999 in France. Over nine tournament games, he averaged 7.2 points, 6.0 rebounds and one assist per game. Tomašević played at the 2000 Summer Olympics in Sydney, Australia, where he averaged 10.3 points, 6.9 rebounds and 1.9 assists per game over seven tournament games. He was a member of the FR Yugoslavia team that won the gold medal at EuroBasket 2001 in Turkey. It was his third EuroBasket gold medal. Over six tournament games, he averaged 6.7 points, 5.0 rebounds and 2.5 assists per game. Tomašević won the back-to-back gold medal at the 2002 FIBA World Championship in Indianapolis, Indiana, U.S. Over nine tournament games, he averaged 6.2 points, 5.1 rebounds and 1.9 assists per game.

As a member of the renamed Serbia and Montenegro national team, Tomašević played at the 2004 Summer Olympics in Athens, Greece, where he averaged 7.2 points, 9.2 rebounds and 2.4 assists per game over five tournament games. He was ranked second overall in rebounds per game, behind Yao Ming.

== Post-playing career ==
=== Basketball Federation of Serbia (2011–2019) ===
In April 2011, Tomašević became the vice-president of the Basketball Federation of Serbia in charge for competitions. In October 2015, Tomašević was appointed as an acting Secretary General for the Basketball Federation of Serbia. In February 2016, he became Secretary General of the Federation. On 20 November 2019, Tomašević resigned as the Secretary General.

In March 2019, the Federation put forward a nomination of Tomašević for the president of the FIBA Europe. On 25 May, Tomašević lost the 2019 FIBA Europe Presidential elections from Turgay Demirel, who was re-elected.

=== Political career ===
He became a member of the ruling populist Serbian Progressive Party (SNS) in May 2023 and was its candidate in the 2023 parliamentary election. Tomašević was elected to the National Assembly and was sworn in as MP on 6 February 2024.

In December 2025, he resigned from parliament to replace Božidar Maljković as the president of the Olympic Committee of Serbia.

== Personal life ==
Tomašević has the skin condition vitiligo.

Sporting positions
Preceded by Božidar Maljković	President of the Olympic Committee of Serbia; 11 December 2025	Succeeded by Incumbent
Preceded by Andrija Kleut	Secretary General of the Basketball Federation of Serbia; 2015–2019	Succeeded by Zlatko Bolić
Preceded by N/A	Vice President of the Basketball Federation of Serbia for competitions 2011–2015	Succeeded by Dušan Projović
