= Vladislav Dragojlović =

Serbian basketball player

Personal information
- Born: March 6, 1979 (age 47) Užice, SFR Yugoslavia
- Listed height: 2.07 m (6 ft 9 in)
- Listed weight: 107 kg (236 lb)

Career information
- NBA draft: 2001: undrafted
- Playing career: 1999–2013
- Position: Center

Career history
- 1999–2002: Sloga Kraljevo
- 2002–2003: OKK Beograd
- 2003–2006: Crvena Zvezda
- 2006–2007: Panionios
- 2007–2008: Budućnost Podgorica
- 2008: Lions Vršac
- 2008–2009: Cherkasy Monkeys
- 2009–2010: Lokomotiv Kuban
- 2010: Radnički Kragujevac
- 2010–2011: Trabzonspor
- 2011: Al-Ittihad Jeddah
- 2012: Radnički Kragujevac
- 2013: Al Kuwait

Vladislav Dragojlović (born March 6, 1979) is a Serbian former professional basketball player. He is a 2.07 m tall center who last played for Al Kuwait.
