= Zoran Nišavić =

Montenegrin basketball player

Personal information
- Born: 23 November 1968 (age 57) Berane, SR Montenegro, Yugoslavia
- Listed height: 1.90 m (6 ft 3 in)
- Listed weight: 83 kg (183 lb)

Career information
- NBA draft: 1990: undrafted
- Playing career: 1986–2006
- Position: Point guard
- Number: 5, 10, 14

Career history
- Jugotes Bijelo Polje
- 1997–2001: Zdravlje
- 2001: Ironi Kiryat Ata
- 2001: Radnički Beograd
- 2001–2002: Crvena zvezda
- 2002–2004: ZTE
- 2004–2006: Albacomp

Zoran "Riko" Nišavić (born 27 March 1991) is a Montenegrin former professional basketball player.

== Professional career ==
A point guard, Nišavić played for Jugotes Bijelo Polje, Zdravlje, Ironi Kiryat Ata, Radnički Beograd, Crvena zvezda, ZTE, and Albacomp. He retired as a player with Albacomp in August 2006.
