= Mileta Lisica =

Serbian-Slovenian basketball player (1966–2020)

Personal information
- Born: 7 October 1966 Priboj, SR Serbia, SFR Yugoslavia
- Died: 11 November 2020 (aged 54) Novi Sad, Serbia
- Listed height: 2.05 m (6 ft 8 1/2 in)

Career information
- NBA draft: 1988: undrafted
- Playing career: 1989–2008
- Position: Power forward / center
- Number: 7, 12, 14

Career history
- 1989–1991: Poliester Priboj
- 1991–1992: Sloboda Tuzla
- 1992–1994: Crvena zvezda
- 1994–1995: Borovica Ruma
- 1995–1996: Crvena zvezda
- 1996–2001: Pivovarna Laško
- 2001–2002: Le Mans
- 2002–2003: Limoges CSP
- 2003–2004: Lavovi 063
- 2005–2007: Novi Sad
- 2007–2008: Rudar Trbovlje

Career highlights
- 2× YUBA League champion (1993, 1994); YUBA League MVP (1994); Slovenian League MVP (2000)

Mileta Lisica (Serbian Cyrillic: Милета Лисица; 7 October 1966 – 11 November 2020) was a Serbian-Slovenian professional basketball player.

== Playing career ==
Lisica had played for the Poliester from Priboj and the Sloboda from Tuzla before he came to the Crvena zvezda. With the Zvezda he won two YUBA League titles (1993 and 1994). He spent one season at the Borovica from Ruma and with them, he reached the YUBA League Playoffs Final in 1995. After that, he returned to the Zvezda and spent another season with them.

In 1996, Lisica went to play for the Pivovarna Laško of the Slovenian Premier League. He played six seasons there and has been one of the team's best players. He participated at three Slovenian League All-Star Games. After leaving Slovenia, he played two seasons in the France LNB Pro A League. He played there for the Le Mans and the Limoges CSP.

In November 2003, he returned to Serbia and played one season for the Lavovi 063 and two seasons for the Novi Sad. Lisica finished his playing career at the Slovenian team Rudar Trbovlje after the 2007–08 season.

== Personal life ==
In 2002, Lisica got Slovenian citizenship.

He had two sons Rade (born 1997) and Đorđe (born 1999), both became basketball players. Rade played for Vojvodina of the Basketball League of Serbia in 2019. Đorđe played for Zlatorog Laško.

On 11 November 2020, Lisica died after a long and severe illness.

== Career achievements and awards ==
=== Club ===
- Yugoslav League champion: 2 (with Crvena zvezda: 1992–93, 1993–94)
- Yugoslav Super Cup winner: 1 (with Crvena zvezda: 1993)

=== Individual ===
- YUBA League MVP: 1994
- Slovenian League MVP: 2000
- Slovenian League Best Foreign Player: 2000
- Slovenian League All-Star Game: 1999, 2000, 2001

== See also ==
- KK Crvena zvezda accomplishments and records
- List of KK Crvena zvezda players with 100 games played
