= KK Vojvodina Srbijagas =

Defunct basketball club in Novi Sad, Serbia

Vojvodina Srbijagas
- Nickname: Voša; Lale (Tulips)
- Founded: 1993; 33 years ago
- Dissolved: 2016; 10 years ago
- History: KK Beobanka (1993–2000); KK NIS Vojvodina (2000–2006); KK Vojvodina Srbijagas (2006–2016) merged with KK Novi Sad; 2011
- Arena: SPC Vojvodina
- Capacity: 11,500
- Location: Serbia; Belgrade (1993–2000); Novi Sad (2000–2016)
- Team colors: Red, white, blue
- Ownership: Naftna Industrija Srbije; 1999–2016
Home	Away

Košarkaški klub Vojvodina Srbijagas (Serbian Cyrillic: Кошаркашки клуб Војводина Србијагас), commonly referred to as KK Vojvodina Srbijagas, was a men's professional basketball club based in Novi Sad, Serbia. The club participated in the Basketball League of Serbia and Adriatic League. They played their home games in SPC Vojvodina.

The club was also known as Nova Vojvodina (transl. New Vojvodina) to distinguish it from the same-name town rivals KK Vojvodina. The club disbanded before the 2016–17 season due to a bad financial situation, when the sponsor, Srbijagas, ceased their investments in the team. It was not a member of the Vojvodina Sport Society, but a successor of the KK Beobanka and KK Novi Sad clubs.

== History ==
=== KK Beobanka period ===
KK Beobanka
- Location: Belgrade, Serbia
- Team colors: Blue and white
Home	Away

KK Beobanka was a club based in Belgrade, FR Yugoslavia (now Serbia), sponsored by Beobanka. The club competed in the First League of FR Yugoslavia from 1995 to 2000. Their matches were played at the Palata sportova. Their biggest success was the participation in the 1997–98 Federal Republic of Yugoslavia Cup final where they lost to the Budućnost. They participated in European competitions – the FIBA Korać Cup (1996–97, and 1998–99) and the FIBA EuroCup (1997–98). It was coached by Darko Ruso. The club was legally disbanded in summer of 2000, relocated to Novi Sad, and renamed to KK NIS Vojvodina.

=== Relocation to Novi Sad: Vojvodina period ===
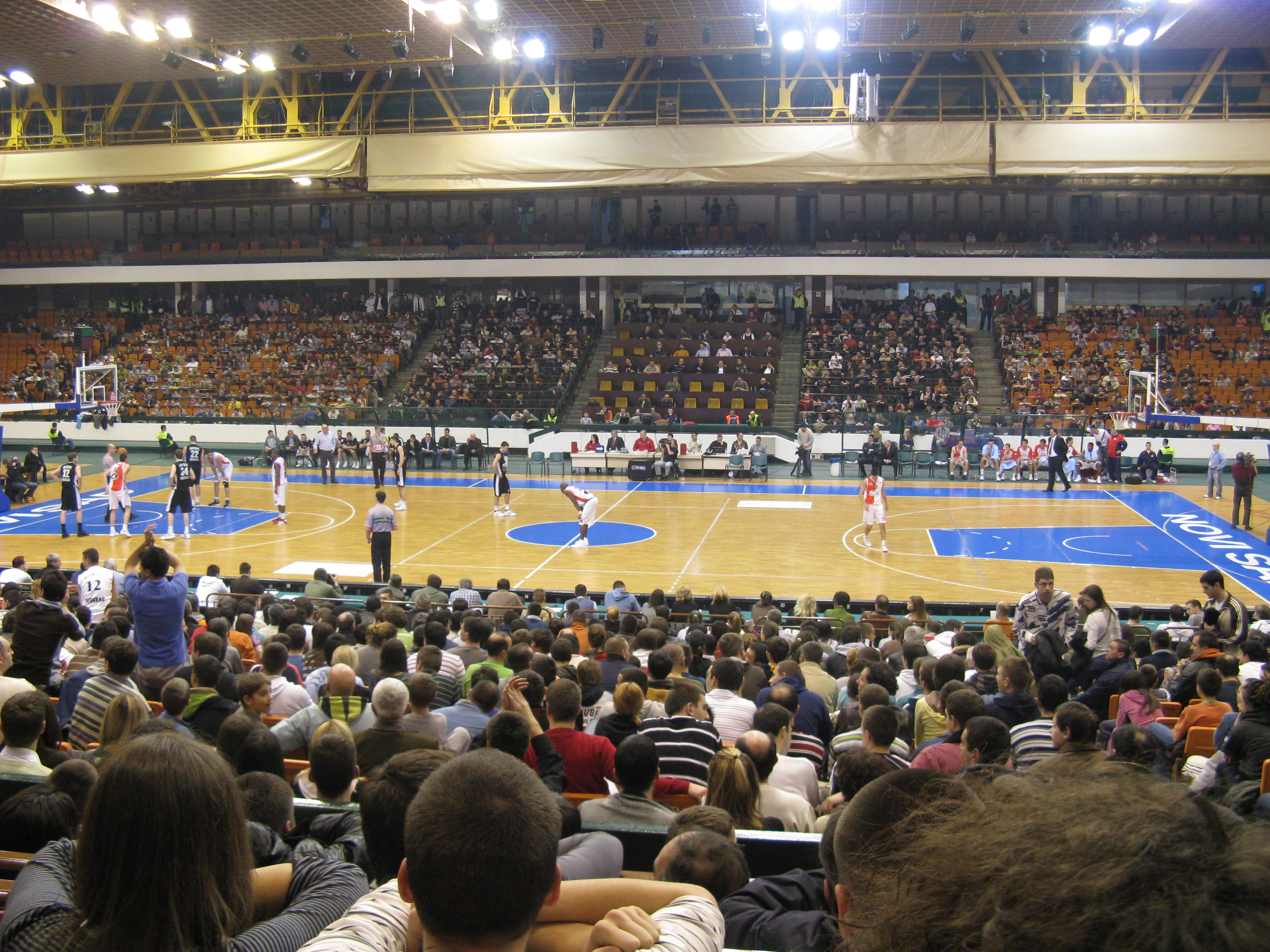
KK Vojvodina Srbijagas against KK Partizan in 2009

KK NIS Vojvodina

Shortly afterward, the Petroleum Industry of Serbia (NIS) took over the founding rights and became the owner of the entire capital of Beobanka/Vojvodina Srbijagas. Thus was created KK NIS Vojvodina before the start of the 2000–01 season. In their debut season in the YUBA League, they finished in eighth place during the regular season, and qualified for the playoffs, where they were eliminated in the first round by KK Budućnost Podgorica after two games.

KK Vojvodina Srbijagas

In 2006, the club changed its name back to the simpler KK Vojvodina Srbijagas. In 2011, the club was merged with another local team, KK Novi Sad. The merger was done to help strengthen the financial position of the clubs. In the summer of 2016, however, Vojvodina Srbijagas went into bankruptcy and subsequently it was dissolved.

== Arena ==
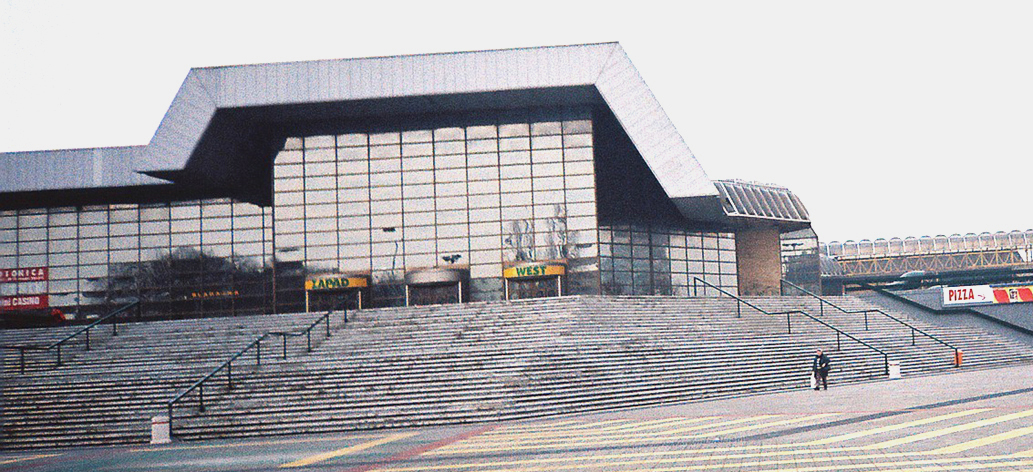
SPC Vojvodina

Sports Center Vojvodina is a multi-purpose indoor arena located in Novi Sad and it has a capacity of 11,500 seats.

- New Belgrade Sports Hall, Belgrade (1995–2000)
- SPC Vojvodina, Novi Sad (2000–2016)

== Head coaches ==
Beobanka

- (Serbia and Montenegro) Zoran Slavnić (1993–1994)
- (Serbia and Montenegro) Darko Ruso (1994–2000)

Vojvodina

- (Serbia and Montenegro) Srđan Antić (2000)
- (Serbia and Montenegro) Milovan Stepandić (2000–2002)
- (Serbia and Montenegro) Miodrag Baletić (2002)
- (Serbia and Montenegro) Miroslav Nikolić (2002–2003)
- (Serbia and Montenegro) Nikola Lazić (2003–2004)
- (Serbia and Montenegro) Jovica Arsić (2004–2005)
- (Serbia and Montenegro) Vlade Đurović (2005)
- (Serbia) Velimir Gašić (2006–2007)
- (Serbia) Zoran Sretenović (2008)
- (Serbia) Milan Minić (2008–2009)
- (Serbia) Vlade Đurović (2009)
- (Serbia) Siniša Matić (2011–2013)
- (Serbia) Dušan Alimpijević (2013–2015)
- (Serbia) Dejan Parežanin (2015–2016)

== Season by season ==
Season	Tier	Division	Pos.	Postseason	W–L	National Cup	Regional competitions			European competitions		
Beobanka
1993–94			N/A	—	N/A	N/A				—		
1994–95	1	YUBA League	N/A	—	19–9	N/A				—		
1995–96	1	YUBA League	5	—	24–12	N/A				—		
1996–97	1	YUBA League	2	N/A	19–7	N/A				3 Korać Cup	R16	2–6
1997–98	1	YUBA League	7	N/A	14–12	Runners up				2 EuroCup	QF	9–7
1998–99	1	YUBA League	6	Not held	11–11	N/A				3 Korać Cup	RS	3–3
1999–00	1	YUBA League	5	Quarterfinalist	13–11	N/A				—		
NIS Vojvodina
2000–01	1	YUBA League	8	Quarterfinalist	9–15	Quarterfinalist				3 Korać Cup	R16	2–6
2001–02	1	YUBA League	6	Quarterfinalist	12–13	N/A	—					
2002–03	1	YUBA League	8	Quarterfinalist	7–17	—	—			4 Champions Cup	GS	4–6
2003–04	1	BLSM First League	3	Semifinalist	26–12	Semifinalist	—			3 Europe League	EF	9–5
2004–05	1	BLSM First League	1	SL 5th	26–14	Quarterfinalist	—			—		
2005–06	1	BLSM First League	A3	—	6–4	Quarterfinalist	ABA League	6	15–11	—		
Vojvodina Srbijagas
2006–07	1	BLS Super League	1	SL 5th	27–9	Quarterfinalist	—			3 FIBA EuroCup	R1	1–5
2007–08	1	BLS Super League	5	—	7–7	Quarterfinalist	ABA League	9	12–14	—		
2008–09	1	BLS Super League	A3	6th place	2–7	Quarterfinalist	ABA League	14	4–22	—		
2009–10	1	BLS First League	6	—	15–11	—	—			—		
2010–11	1	BLS First League	10	—	12–14	—	—			—		
2011–12	1	BLS First League	1	Semifinalist	30–12	Quarterfinalist	—			—		
2012–13	1	BLS First League	1	Semifinalist	28–14	Quarterfinalist	—			—		
2013–14	1	BLS First League	8	—	12–14	—	—			—		
2014–15	1	BLS First League	3	SL 5th	23–13	Quarterfinalist	—			—		
2015–16	1	BLS First League	13	—	9–17	—	—			—		

== Notable players ==
Note: Flags indicate national team eligibility at FIBA-sanctioned events. Players may hold other non-FIBA nationalities not displayed.

Criteria

To appear in this section a player must have either:

- Set a club record or won an individual award while at the club
- Played at least one official international match for their national team at any time
- Played at least one official NBA match at any time.

=== KK Beobanka players ===
- (Federal Republic of Yugoslavia) Petar Božić
- (Federal Republic of Yugoslavia) Zoran Stevanović
- (Federal Republic of Yugoslavia) Luka Pavićević
- (Federal Republic of Yugoslavia) Mlađan Šilobad
- (Federal Republic of Yugoslavia) Aleksandar Glintić
- (Federal Republic of Yugoslavia) (North Macedonia) Vladimir Kuzmanović
- (Federal Republic of Yugoslavia) Goran Ćakić
- (Federal Republic of Yugoslavia) Oliver Popović
- (Federal Republic of Yugoslavia) Vojkan Benčić
- (Federal Republic of Yugoslavia) Marko Ivanović
- (Federal Republic of Yugoslavia) Stevan Nađfeji
- (Federal Republic of Yugoslavia) Milan Preković

=== KK Vojvodina players ===
- (Serbia) Milan Gurović
- (Serbia) Nikola Kalinić
- (Serbia) Milenko Tepić
- (Serbia) Ivan Paunić
- (Serbia) Zlatko Bolić
- (Serbia) Nenad Čanak
- (Serbia) Miljan Pavković
- (Serbia) Vanja Plisnić
- (Serbia) Jovo Stanojević
- (Serbia) Predrag Šuput
- (Serbia) Milan Dozet
- (Serbia) Aleksandar Čubrilo
- (Serbia) Dušan Đorđević
- (Serbia) Đorđe Gagić
- (Serbia) Mile Ilić
- (Serbia) Strahinja Milošević
- (Serbia) Čedomir Vitkovac
- (Serbia) Stefan Pot
- (Serbia) Dragoljub Vidačić
- (Serbia) Filip Čović
- (Serbia) Stefan Stojačić
- (Serbia) Dejan Borovnjak
- (Serbia) Nemanja Nenadić
- (Serbia) Uroš Mirković
- (Serbia) Radovan Marković
- (Serbia) Milan Milovanović
- (Serbia) Jovan Novak
- (Serbia) Miljan Pupović
- (Montenegro) Miloš Borisov
- (Montenegro) Dejan Radonjić
- (Montenegro) Vladimir Golubović
- (Montenegro) (Serbia) Dragan Zeković
- (Hungary) István Németh
- (Bosnia and Herzegovina) Ivan Opačak
- (Bosnia and Herzegovina) Feliks Kojadinović
- (Bosnia and Herzegovina) Siniša Kovačević
- (Bosnia and Herzegovina) Marko Šutalo
- (Slovenia) Smiljan Pavič
- (Serbia) Marko Jeremić
- (United States) Kebu Stewart
- (United States) Charron Fisher
- (United States) Reggie Freeman
- (United States) Vonteego Cummings
- (United States) Hassan Adams
- (United States) Paul Grant

== International record ==
Season	Achievement	Notes
FIBA Saporta Cup
1997–98	Quarterfinals	Eliminated by Žalgiris, 119–137 (0–2)
FIBA EuroChallenge
2003–04	Round of 16	Eliminated by UNICS, 0–2
2006–07	Round One	4th in Group F with Maroussi Honda, ASK Rīga, and ČEZ Nymburk (1–5)
FIBA Korać Cup
1996–97	Round of 16	Eliminated by Aris, 138–141 (1–1)
1998–99	Regular season	3rd in Group P with Darüșșafaka, Iraklio Minoan Lines, and Chemosvit (3–3)
2000–01	Round of 32	4th in Group D with Fenerbahçe, Hemofarm, and Türk Telekom (0–6)
FIBA EuroCup Challenge
2002–03	Regional Qual. Round	4th in Conference South Group A with Hapoel Jerusalem, Yambolgaz-92, Pinar Karşıyaka, and Feršped Rabotnički (4–6)
