= 2005–06 YUBA League =

14th edition of YUBA League

2005–06 Naša Sinalco Prva Liga^{1}
- League: YUBA League
- Season: 2005–06
- Dates: 16 October 2004 – 1 April 2005 (Regular season); 14 April – 24 May 2006 (Super League); 30 May – 18 June 2006 (Playoffs)
- Teams: 17

Finals
- Champions: Partizan
- Runners-up: Crvena zvezda
- Semifinalists: FMP Železnik; Budućnost

Seasons
- ← 2004–05 2006–07 (KLS) →
- ^{1} Sponsored league name, referring to Sinalco.

The 2005–06 Naša Prva Liga (also known as 2005–06 Naša Sinalco Prva Liga for sponsorship reasons) was the last season of the YUBA League, the top-tier professional basketball league in Serbia and Montenegro.

The first part of the season consisted of 12 teams and was played by all clubs that had qualified for it, except those participating in the ABA League (Partizan, Hemofarm, FMP Železnik, Crvena zvezda, and NIS Vojvodina).

The second phase of the competition (Super League) was played in a different format compared to previous seasons. This time, 7 teams advanced from the first phase and, together with 5 teams from the ABA League, formed two groups of 6 teams each. The top two teams from each group advanced to the playoffs, which were played in a best-of-five series.

== Regular season ==
=== Standings ===
Pos	Team	Pld	W	L	PF	PA	PD	Pts	Qualification or relegation
1	Budućnost	22	19	3	1937	1651	+286	41	Qualification to Super League
2	Mornar	22	14	8	1853	1851	+2	36	Qualification to Super League
3	OKK Beograd	22	13	9	1915	1844	+71	35	Qualification to Super League
4	Mašinac	22	13	9	1732	1733	−1	35	Qualification to Super League
5	Zdravlje	22	12	10	1827	1722	+105	34	Qualification to Super League
6	Borac	22	11	11	1813	1838	−25	33	Qualification to Super League
7	Atlas	22	11	11	1883	1871	+12	33	Qualification to Super League
8	Ergonom	22	10	12	1844	1891	−47	32	
9	Sloga	22	10	12	1795	1826	−31	32	
10	Mega Ishrana	22	9	13	1769	1774	−5	31	
11	Napredak Rubin	22	6	16	1807	1945	−138	28	
12	Primorka	22	4	18	1767	1996	−229	26	

Source: kosarka.co.yu, srbijasport.net

== Super League ==
=== Group A ===
==== Standings ====
Pos	Team	Pld	W	L	PF	PA	PD	Pts	Qualification or relegation
1	Partizan	10	9	1	960	780	+180	19	Qualification to Playoffs
2	FMP Železnik	10	9	1	882	769	+113	19	Qualification to Playoffs
3	NIS Vojvodina	10	6	4	858	859	−1	16	
4	Borac	10	2	8	814	899	−85	12	
5	Mornar	10	2	8	823	930	−107	12	
6	Mašinac	10	2	8	753	853	−100	12	

Source: kosarka.co.yu, srbijasport.net

=== Group B ===
==== Standings ====
Pos	Team	Pld	W	L	PF	PA	PD	Pts	Qualification or relegation
1	Crvena zvezda	10	9	1	909	796	+113	19	Qualification to Playoffs
2	Budućnost	10	8	2	799	760	+39	18	Qualification to Playoffs
3	Hemofarm	10	6	4	867	812	+55	16	
4	OKK Beograd	10	5	5	873	889	−16	15	
5	Borac	10	2	8	813	912	−99	12	
6	Atlas	10	0	10	811	903	−92	10	

Source: kosarka.co.yu, srbijasport.net

== Playoffs ==
=== Bracket ===
Semifinals
30 May – 4 June
Partizan	3
Budućnost	0
31 May – 10 June
Crvena zvezda	3
FMP Železnik	2

Finals
13–18 June
Partizan	3
Crvena zvezda	0

=== Semifinals ===
Team 1	Series	Team 2	Game 1	Game 2	Game 3	Game 4	Game 5
Partizan	3–0	Budućnost	76–63	96–74	86–80	—	—
Crvena zvezda	3–2	FMP Železnik	78–79	81–61	83–73	68–97	87–85

=== Finals ===
Team 1	Series	Team 2	Game 1	Game 2	Game 3	Game 4	Game 5
Partizan	3–0	Crvena zvezda	84–78	20–0	89–73	—	—

== See also ==
- 2005–06 Radivoj Korać Cup
