= Mijailo Grušanović =

Serbian basketball player

Personal information
- Born: 19 September 1962 (age 64) Bogatić, PR Serbia, Yugoslavia
- Listed height: 2.07 m (6 ft 9 in)

Career information
- NBA draft: 1984: undrafted
- Playing career: 1978–2010
- Position: Center
- Number: 9, 14, 16

Career history
- 1978–1998: Iva Šabac
- 1998–1999: Beopetrol
- 1999–2000: Borac Čačak
- 2000–2002: NIS Vojvodina
- 2002–2003: Lavovi 063
- 2003–2004: Swisslion Takovo
- 2004–2005: Rudar Ugljevik
- 2007–2010: OKK Šabac

Mijailo "Mikan" Grušanović (Serbian Cyrillic: Мијаило "Микан" Грушановић; born 19 September 1962) is a Serbian former professional basketball player.

== Playing career ==
A center, Grušanović played professional basketball for over 30 years for Serbia-based clubs Iva Šabac, Beopetrol, Borac Čačak, NIS Vojvodina, Lavovi 063, Swisslion Takovo, and OKK Šabac.
