= KK Berane =

- Founded: 1949
- Dissolved: 1990s
- History: KK Radnički Ivangrad (1949–1966); KK Ivangrad (1966–1992); Raj banka Berane (1993–1995); KK Berane (1992–)
- Location: Berane, Montenegro (formerly Ivangrad, SFR Yugoslavia)
- Team colors: Blue, White

KK Berane (formerly KK Radnički and later KK Ivangrad) was a basketball club based in Berane (then Ivangrad), Montenegro.

The club is best remembered for being the first team from Montenegro to compete in the Yugoslav First Federal League, the top-tier basketball league of SFR Yugoslavia, during the 1960s. The club folded in the late 1990s, with KK Lim Berane viewed as its successor.

== History ==
Organized basketball in Ivangrad began in 1949, when the first basketball section was formed. In 1951 the club was formally named KK Radnički (Ivangrad). In the 1960s the club adopted the name KK Ivangrad. Under this name it achieved its greatest success: first Montenegrin club in history to qualify for the Yugoslav First Federal League (the elite level of Yugoslav basketball).

=== Dissolution ===
By the late 1990s the senior team ceased operations due to financial and structural difficulties. The basketball tradition in the town was later continued through newly founded club KK Lim Berane, established in 2010.

=== First League seasons ===
- 1966 Yugoslav First Basketball League
- 1994–95 YUBA League

== See also ==
- KK Lim Berane
- Yugoslav First Federal Basketball League
