= KK Radnički Kragujevac (1950–2004) =

Defunct basketball club in Kragujevac, Serbia and Montenegro

Radnički
- Nickname: Đavoli (The Devils)
- Founded: 1950; 75 years ago
- Folded: 2004; 21 years ago merged into Radnički Zastava
- History: KK Radnički; 1950–2004
- Arena: Jezero Hall
- Capacity: 5,320
- Location: Kragujevac, Serbia and Montenegro
- Team colors: Red and White
Home	Away

Košarkaški klub Radnički (Serbian Cyrillic: Кошаркашки клуб Раднички), commonly referred to as KK Radnički Kragujevac, was a men's professional basketball club, based in Kragujevac, Serbia and Montenegro.

== History ==
Established in 1950, the club merged with Zastava Kragujevac into Radnički Zastava in 2004. The multiple clubs have bared their name and tradition, such as the club who played in the ABA League, or the current BLS member.

== Home arena ==
Radnički used to play their home games at the Jezero Hall. The hall is located in the Kragujevac and was built in 1978. It has a seating capacity of 5,320 seats.

== Coaches ==
- (Socialist Federal Republic of Yugoslavia) Vojislav Vezović (1974–1976)
- (Socialist Federal Republic of Yugoslavia) Strahinja Alagić
- (Federal Republic of Yugoslavia) Miroslav Nikolić (1993–1994)
- (Federal Republic of Yugoslavia) Velislav Vesković (1994–1995)
- (Federal Republic of Yugoslavia) Petar Rodić (1996–1997)
- (Federal Republic of Yugoslavia) Miroslav Tomović (2002–2004)
