= Miroslav Nikolić =

Serbian basketball player and coach

Personal information
- Born: 8 January 1956 (age 70) Kragujevac, PR Serbia, FPR Yugoslavia

Career information
- NBA draft: 1978: undrafted
- Playing career: 1974–1990
- Position: Head coach
- Number: 5, 12
- Coaching career: 1990–present

Career history

Coaching
- 1990–1991: Maribor
- 1991–1992: Dynamic
- 1992–1993: KK Goša
- 1993–1994: Radnički Kragujevac
- 1994–1996: BFC Beočin
- 1996–1998: Partizan
- 1998–2000: Budućnost
- 2001: KK Crvena zvezda
- 2001–2002: Radnički Belgrade
- 2002: Crvena zvezda
- 2002–2003: NIS Vojvodina
- 2003–2004: Apollon Patras
- 2004–2005: Budućnost
- 2005–2008: Hemofarm
- 2008–2009: Avtodor Saratov
- 2009: EKA AEL
- 2009–2014: Radnički Kragujevac
- 2016–2017: Dynamic
- 2017: Partizan
- 2017–2018: Dynamic
- 2020–2022: Vojvodina

Career highlights
- As head coach: 3× YUBA League champion (1997, 1999, 2000); 2× Serbian League Cup winner (2017, 2021)
Medals
Men's basketball
Head Coach for Serbia
U19 World Championship
Gold medal – first place	2007 Serbia	Team
Head Coach for Serbia and Montenegro
U20 European Championship
Gold medal – first place	2006 Turkey	Team

Miroslav "Muta" Nikolić (Serbian: Мирослав Николић; born 8 January 1956) is a Serbian professional basketball coach and former player.

== Playing career ==
Nikolić played professional basketball for KK Goša from Smederevska Palanka, OKK Beograd, Vršac, IMT, Maribor and Radnički Kragujevac.

== Coaching career ==
Nikolić started his coaching career in 1990. He coached Maribor, Radnički Kragujevac (est. 1950), IMT Beograd, BFC Beočin, Partizan, Budućnost, Crvena zvezda, NIS Vojvodina, Apollon Patras, Hemofarm, Avtodor Saratov, Radnički Kragujevac (est. 2009) and Dynamic.

== National team coaching career ==
Nikolić was an assistant coach of Yugoslavia national team under Željko Obradović between 1996 and 1998. He won the silver medal at the 1996 Summer Olympics in Atlanta and, two gold medals later, at the 1997 European Championship in Spain and the 1998 FIBA World Championship in Greece.

In 2006, Nikolić was the head coach of the Serbia and Montenegro under-20 national team, with whom he won a gold medal at the 2006 FIBA Europe Under-20 Championship in Turkey. In 2007, he was the head coach of the Serbia under-19 national team, with whom he won a gold medal at the 2007 FIBA Under-19 World Championship in Serbia.

In 2009, he was appointed as head coach of EuroChallenge powerhouse, Proteas EKA AEL. He was brought on late in the season in what was to be AEL's most recent attempt to be crowned with the imminently approaching 2008–09 EuroChallenge, as the club had already qualified for that season's Final Four in Bologna. Ultimately the Serb was unable to bring glory to the Cypriot club, as AEL lost to Virtus Bologna by 83–69 in the semi-finals. AEL subsequently went on to also lose the consolation final to Triumph Lyubertsy by 94–82.

Between 2014 and 2019, Nikolić was an assistant coach of Serbia national team under Aleksandar Đorđević. He also has two silver medals from the 2014 FIBA Basketball World Cup in Spain and 2016 Summer Olympics in Rio de Janeiro.

== Administrative career ==
In July 2018, Nikolić became a sporting director for Dynamic BG, where he previously had served as the head coach. He left the spot in May 2019.

== Career achievements ==
As head coach

- YUBA League champion: 3 (with Partizan: 1996–97, and with Budućnost: 1998–99, 1999–2000)
- Serbian League Cup winner: 2 (with Dynamic BG: 2016–17, and with Vojvodina: 2020–21)

As national team assistant coach

- 1996 Summer Olympics: Silver
- 1997 FIBA European Championship: Gold
- 1998 FIBA World Championship: Gold
- 2014 FIBA Basketball World Cup: Silver
- 2016 Summer Olympics: Silver
- 2017 Eurobasket: Silver

== See also ==
- List of KK Crvena zvezda head coaches
- List of KK Partizan head coaches
