= KK Borovica =

Defunct basketball club in Ruma, Serbia

Borovica
- Dissolved: 1999; 26 years ago
- History: KK Picadilly (?–1994); KK Borovica (1994–1998); KK Zvezda (1998–1999); KK Ruma (2013–2015); KK Sloven (2015–)
- Arena: SC Ruma (capacity: 2,500)
- Location: Podgorica, FR Yugoslavia (?–1994); Ruma, FR Yugoslavia (1994–1999)
- President: Dušan Borovica

Košarkaški klub Borovica, commonly referred to as KK Borovica Ruma, was a men's professional basketball club based in Ruma, Serbia, FR Yugoslavia.

== History ==
The most successful years were from 1994 to 1998, under the name KK Borovica. Borovica finished the 1994–95 YUBA League season as a runner-up, lost the Play-off Finals from Partizan. The club also played the FIBA Korać Cup in the 1995–96 season.

== Coaches ==
- (Serbia and Montenegro) Zvezdan Mitrović (1993–1994)
- (Serbia and Montenegro) Zlatan Tomić (1994)
- (Serbia and Montenegro) Željko Lukajić (1994–1995)
- (North Macedonia) Janko Lukovski (1995–1996)
- (Serbia and Montenegro) Nikola Lazić (1997–1998)
- (Serbia and Montenegro) Zlatan Tomić (1998)

== Notable players ==
- (Serbia and Montenegro) Zoran Sretenović (1994–1995, 1996–1997)
- (Serbia and Montenegro) Mileta Lisica (1994–1995)
- (Serbia and Montenegro) Vladimir Dragutinović (1994–1996)
- (Serbia and Montenegro) Zoran Milović (1996–1998)
- (Serbia and Montenegro) Slobodan Agoč (1997–1998)

== International record ==
Season	Achievement	Notes
FIBA Korać Cup
1995–96	Round of 32	Eliminated by Panionios Afisorama, 140–162 (0–2)
