= YUBA League =

Basketball league in Serbia and Montenegro

- Founded: 1992
- First season: 1992–93
- Folded: 2006
- Country: (Federal Republic of Yugoslavia) FR Yugoslavia (1992–2003); Serbia and Montenegro (2003–2006)
- Confederation: FIBA Europe
- Number of teams: 18
- Level on pyramid: 1
- Feeder to: ABA League
- Relegation to: YUBA B League
- Domestic cup(s): FR Yugoslavia Cup; Radivoj Korać Cup
- Most championships: Partizan (8 titles)

The YUBA League was the top-tier men's professional basketball league in Serbia and Montenegro (previously FR Yugoslavia). Founded in 1992 and folded in 2006, it was run by the Basketball Federation of Serbia and Montenegro.

The name YUBA League (Yugoslav Basketball Association League) was used in Serbia and Montenegro until 2006. It consisted of the first-stage "First League", and the second-stage "Super League", with each having their own men's and women's divisions. The league was also named YUBA League: Sportstar YUBA League, Winston YUBA League, Frikom YUBA League, Efes Pils YUBA League, Atlas Pils YUBA League, and Sinalco First League, for sponsorship reasons. For past league sponsorship names, see the list below.

When Serbia and Montenegro peacefully separated in 2006, the YUBA League ceased to exist and was re-branded as the Basketball League of Serbia a Serbia-only organization, with Montenegro forming its own federation.

== Rules ==
=== Competition format 2003–2006 ===
Both the Super League and First League used a double round-robin style qualification round, where each team played every other team both at home and away. Even the quarters, semis, and finals were played at home and away, including a tie-breaker if necessary with the home advantage awarded to the better qualifying team.

The Super League men's contained eight clubs, while women's contained six. Immediately after the qualification round were the semi-finals, in which the top four qualifying teams competed in. While the two leagues worked exactly the same, the First League however, contained almost twice as many clubs as the Super League, fourteen and twelve for men's and women's respectively and therefore included quarter finals.

== History ==
=== Championship history ===
Name of country	First season	Last season	Seasons
FR Yugoslavia	1992–93	2001–02	10
Serbia and Montenegro	2002–03	2005–06	4

=== Sponsorship naming ===
The League has had several denominations through the years due to its sponsorship:

- Sportstar YUBA League: 1995–1996
- Winston YUBA League: 1996–2002
- Frikom YUBA League: 2002–2003
- Efes Pils YUBA League: 2003–2004
- Atlas Pils YUBA League: 2004–2005
- Sinalco First League: 2005–2006

=== Champions ===
- 1992–93 Crvena zvezda
- 1993–94 Crvena zvezda
- 1994–95 Partizan
- 1995–96 Partizan
- 1996–97 Partizan
- 1997–98 Crvena zvezda
- 1998–99 Budućnost
- 1999–00 Budućnost
- 2000–01 Budućnost
- 2001–02 Partizan ICN
- 2002–03 Partizan Mobtel
- 2003–04 Partizan Mobtel
- 2004–05 Partizan Pivara MB
- 2005–06 Partizan Pivara MB

=== Performance by club ===
Club	Titles	Years won	Runners up
Partizan	8	1995, 1996, 1997, 2002, 2003, 2004, 2005, 2006	4
Crvena zvezda	3	1993, 1994, 1998	2
Budućnost	3	1999, 2000, 2001	1
FMP	-		3
Vršac	-		2
Borovica	-		1
BFC	-		1

== Play-off finals ==
Season	Home court advantage	Result	Home court disadvantage	1st of Regular Season	Record
1992–93	Crvena zvezda	3–2	Partizan	Crvena zvezda	28–6
1993–94	Partizan	1–4	Crvena zvezda	Partizan	27–5
1994–95	Partizan	4–1	TG Borovica Ruma	Partizan	24–4
1995–96	Partizan	3–2	BFC Beočin	Partizan	27–9
1996–97	Partizan	3–1	FMP	Partizan	20–6
1997–98	Crvena zvezda	3–1	FMP	Partizan	24–2
1998–99	Not played due to the NATO bombing of Yugoslavia			Budućnost	20–2
1999–00	Budućnost	3–0	Partizan	Budućnost	22–0
2000–01	Budućnost	3–2	Partizan	Budućnost	21–1
2001–02	Budućnost	2–3	Partizan ICN	Budućnost	18–4
2002–03	Partizan Mobtel	3–0	FMP	Partizan Mobtel	20–2
2003–04	Partizan Mobtel	3–1	Hemofarm	Partizan Mobtel	20–2/12–2
2004–05	Partizan Pivara MB	3–1	Hemofarm	Partizan Pivara MB	11–3
2005–06	Partizan Pivara MB	3–0	Crvena zvezda	Partizan Pivara MB	9–1

== Statistical leaders ==
=== Points ===
Season	Player	Team	PPG
1993–94	(Socialist Federal Republic of Yugoslavia) Slađan Stojković		28.0
1999–00	(Socialist Federal Republic of Yugoslavia) Branko Milisavljević	KK Borac Čačak	25.1
2000–01	(Socialist Federal Republic of Yugoslavia) Miroslav Berić	KK Partizan	22.8
2001–02	(Socialist Federal Republic of Yugoslavia) Zlatko Bolic	NIS Vojvodina	20.7
2002–03	(Socialist Federal Republic of Yugoslavia) Milos Vujanic	KK Partizan	23.1
2005–06	(Serbia) Marko Derasimovic	KK Zdravlje	18.73

=== Rebounds ===
Season	Player	Team	RPG
1993–94	(Socialist Federal Republic of Yugoslavia) Milenko Topić	KK Profikolor	8.4
1999–00	(Socialist Federal Republic of Yugoslavia) Dejan Milojević	KK FMP	9.9
2000–01	(Socialist Federal Republic of Yugoslavia) Dejan Tomašević (Socialist Federal Republic of Yugoslavia) Ognjen Aškrabić	KK Budućnost; KK FMP	11.2
2001–02	(Socialist Federal Republic of Yugoslavia) Savo Djikanovic	KK Lovćen 1947	10.1
2002–03	(Socialist Federal Republic of Yugoslavia) Dejan Milojević	KK FMP	10.6
2005–06	(Serbia) Bojan Ljubojevic	Mornar Bar	7.25

=== Assists ===
Season	Player	Team	APG
1993–94	(Socialist Federal Republic of Yugoslavia) Zoran Sretenović	KK Partizan	2.9
1999–00	(Socialist Federal Republic of Yugoslavia) Dragan Lukovski	KK Crvena zvezda	3.4
2000–01	(Socialist Federal Republic of Yugoslavia) Zoran Nišavić	BKK Radnički	3.9
2001–02	(Socialist Federal Republic of Yugoslavia) Miljan Pavkovic	KK Zdravlje	6.1
2002–03	(United States) Scoonie Penn	KK Crvena zvezda	4.3
2005–06	(Serbia) Dejan Tomasevic	Primorka Bar	5.45

Source:proballers.com

== Awards ==
=== MVP ===
Season	Player	Team
1992–93	(Socialist Federal Republic of Yugoslavia) Nebojša Ilić	KK Crvena zvezda
1993–94	(Socialist Federal Republic of Yugoslavia) Mijailo Grušanović	OKK Šabac
1994–95		
1995–96	(Socialist Federal Republic of Yugoslavia) Milenko Topić	BFC Beočin
1995–97	(Socialist Federal Republic of Yugoslavia) Milenko Topić (2)	BFC Beočin
1997–98	(Socialist Federal Republic of Yugoslavia) Mijailo Grušanović (2)	OKK Šabac
1998–99		
1999–00		
2000–01	(Socialist Federal Republic of Yugoslavia) Dušan Kecman	KK Atlas
2001–02	(Socialist Federal Republic of Yugoslavia) Jovo Stanojević	KK Partizan
2002–03		
2003–04	(Socialist Federal Republic of Yugoslavia) Dejan Milojević	KK Partizan

=== Finals MVP ===
Season	Player	Team
1993–94	(Socialist Federal Republic of Yugoslavia) (Slovenia) Mileta Lisica	KK Crvena zvezda
1999–00	(Socialist Federal Republic of Yugoslavia) Milenko Topić	KK Budućnost
2003–04	(Socialist Federal Republic of Yugoslavia) Vlado Šćepanović	KK Partizan
2004–05	(Socialist Federal Republic of Yugoslavia) Dejan Milojević	KK Partizan

=== Most improved player ===
Season	Player	Team
1997–98	(Socialist Federal Republic of Yugoslavia) Igor Rakočević	KK Crvena zvezda

== Winning coaches ==
Season	Coach	Team
1992–93	(Socialist Federal Republic of Yugoslavia) Vladislav Lučić	KK Crvena zvezda
1993–94	(Socialist Federal Republic of Yugoslavia) Vladislav Lučić	KK Crvena zvezda
1994–95	(Socialist Federal Republic of Yugoslavia) Borislav Džaković	KK Partizan
1995–96	(Socialist Federal Republic of Yugoslavia) Ranko Žeravica	KK Partizan
1995–97	(Socialist Federal Republic of Yugoslavia) Miroslav Nikolić	KK Partizan
1997–98	(Socialist Federal Republic of Yugoslavia) Vladislav Lučić (3) (Socialist Federal Republic of Yugoslavia) (Montenegro) Mihailo Pavićević (Note: Lucic was fired on May 7, 1998, after losing to FMP in the second game of the playoff finals. The result of the final series at the time of dismissal was 1-1, and Red Star won the title in the end with Mihailo Pavićević (he was the coach at the beginning of the season).)	KK Crvena zvezda
1998–99	(Socialist Federal Republic of Yugoslavia) Miroslav Nikolić	KK Buducnost
1999–00	(Socialist Federal Republic of Yugoslavia) Miroslav Nikolić (3)	KK Buducnost
2000–01	(Socialist Federal Republic of Yugoslavia) Bogdan Tanjevic	KK Buducnost
2001–02	(Socialist Federal Republic of Yugoslavia) Duško Vujošević	KK Partizan
2002–03	(Socialist Federal Republic of Yugoslavia) Duško Vujošević	KK Partizan
2003–04	(Socialist Federal Republic of Yugoslavia) Duško Vujošević	KK Partizan
2004–05	(Socialist Federal Republic of Yugoslavia) Duško Vujošević	KK Partizan
2005–06	(Socialist Federal Republic of Yugoslavia) Duško Vujošević (5)	KK Partizan

== Following national leagues ==
- Basketball League of Serbia (2006–present)
- (Montenegro) Montenegrin Basketball League (2006–present)

== FR Yugoslavia Super Cup ==
Season	Date	League Champion	Result	Cup Winner	Ref.
1993–94	December 1993	Crvena zvezda	83–78	OKK Beograd	

== See also ==
- Basketball League of Serbia
- YUBA All-Star Game
- Yugoslav First Basketball League
- Yugoslav Basketball Cup
- Adriatic League
