= Momir Milatović =

Montenegrin basketball player and coach

Personal information
- Born: 7 September 1955 (age 71) Titograd, PR Montenegro, FPR Yugoslavia

Career history

Coaching
- Ljubović Podgorica
- Budućnost (men's team)
- 1988–1991: Željezničar Sarajevo
- 1991–1993: ŽKK Bečej
- 1994–1995: Lovćen
- 1996–1998: FMP Železnik
- 1997: FR Yugoslavia (assistant)
- 1999: Crvena zvezda
- 2005–2007: Budućnost (women's team)
- Vojvodina
- 2008–?: Dongguan
- 2010–2011: Jolly JBŠ (women's team)
- 2012–2013: Jedinstvo Bijelo Polje
- 2013–2014: Ulcinj
- 2014–2017: Montenegro
- 2014: Jolly JBŠ (men's team)

Momir Milatović (born 7 September 1955) is a Montenegrin professional basketball coach and former player.

== Playing career ==
Milatović played for Budućnost Podgorica and Elektrokosovo Priština.

== Coaching career ==
=== Men's basketball ===
Milatović coached Ljubović and Budućnost in Podgorica, Željezničar in Sarajevo, Lovćen, FMP Železnik and Crvena zvezda in Belgrade, Ulcinj, as well as Jolly JBŠ in Šibenik, Croatia. He also coached teams in China.

=== Women's basketball ===
He coached Bečej, Budućnost from Podgorica, Vojvodina from Novi Sad, Jedinstvo Bijelo Polje and Jolly JBŠ from Šibenik, Croatia.

== National team coaching career ==
Milatović was an assistant coach of Željko Obradović in the national team of Yugoslavia in 1997.

In January 2014, Milatović become a head coach of Montenegro women's national team. He led them at EuroBasket Women 2015 in Hungary and Romania.

== Personal life ==
His brother, Nikola Milatović, is a basketball coach.

== See also ==
- List of Red Star Belgrade basketball coaches
