= OKK Šabac =

Basketball club in Šabac, Serbia

- Leagues: Second Regional League
- History: Mačva; 1976–1977; OKK Šabac ??–1984; Zorka; 1984–1992; Iva Unicom; 1992–1994; Iva Omega; 1994–1995; Iva Kormilo; 1995–1996; Iva Zorka Pharma; 1996–1999; OKK Šabac; 1999–present
- Arena: Zorka Hall
- Capacity: 2,300
- Location: Šabac, Serbia
- Team colors: Black and Red
- President: Dragan Vuković

Omladinski košarkaški klub Šabac (Serbian Cyrillic: Омладински кошаркашки клуб Шабац), commonly referred to as OKK Šabac or simply Šabac, is a men's basketball club based in Šabac, Serbia. They are currently competing in the 4th-tier Second Regional League, West Division.

== Coaches ==
- (Socialist Federal Republic of Yugoslavia) Milovan Stepandić (1980–1990)
- (Socialist Federal Republic of Yugoslavia) Đorđe Petrović (1990–1991)
- (Serbia and Montenegro) Milovan Stepandić (1991–1996)
- (Serbia and Montenegro) Dragan Vuković (1996–1998)
- (Serbia and Montenegro) Milovan Stepandić (1998)
- (Serbia and Montenegro) Dragan Vuković (2001–2002)

== Trophies and awards ==
=== Trophies ===
- First Regional League (3rd-tier)
  - Winner (2): 2010–11, 2012–13

== International record ==
Season	Achievement	Notes
FIBA Korać Cup
1996–97	Round of 32	Eliminated by Mazowzanka, 165–176 (1–1)
