= 2000–01 YUBA League =

9th edition of YUBA League

2000–01 Winston YUBA League
- League: YUBA League
- Season: 2000–01
- Dates: 14 October 2000 – 1 April 2001 (Regular season); 21 April – 23 May 2001 (Playoffs)
- Games played: 22 each
- Teams: 12

Regular season
- Top seed: Budućnost, 21–1
- Season MVP: (Federal Republic of Yugoslavia) Dušan Kecman

Finals
- Champions: Budućnost
- Runners-up: Partizan ICN
- Semifinalists: Lovćen; Hemofarm

Statistical leaders
Points	(Federal Republic of Yugoslavia) Miroslav Berić	22.8
Rebounds	(Federal Republic of Yugoslavia) Dejan Tomašević; Ognjen Aškrabić	11.2
Assists	(Federal Republic of Yugoslavia) Zoran Nišavić	3.9

Seasons
- ← 1999–2000 2001–02 →

The 2000–01 Winston YUBA League (Serbian Cyrillic: Винстон ЈУБА лига 2000/01.) was the 9th season of the YUBA League, the top-tier professional basketball league in Yugoslavia (later renamed to Serbia and Montenegro).

== Teams ==
A total of 12 teams participated in the 2000–01 Winston YUBA League.

=== Distribution ===
The following is the access list for this season.

Access list for the 2000–01 Winston YUBA League
	Teams entering in this round	Teams advancing from the previous round
Regular season (12 teams)	10 highest-placed teams from the previous season; 2 highest-placed teams from the B League	
Playoffs (8 teams)		8 highest-placed teams from the Regular season

=== Promotion and relegation ===
Teams promoted from the YUBA B League

- Zdravlje
- Sloga Telekom Srbija

Teams relegated to the YUBA B League

- Spartak
- Ibon

=== Venues and locations ===
Location of clubs in the 2000–01 season

Club	Home city	Arena	Capacity
Beopetrol	Belgrade	New Belgrade Sports Hall	5,000
Borac Čačak	Čačak	Borac Hall	3,000
Budućnost	Podgorica	Morača Hall	4,300
Crvena zvezda	Belgrade	Pionir Hall	5,878
FMP Železnik	Belgrade	Železnik Hall	3,000
Hemofarm	Vršac	Millennium Centar	5,000
Lovćen osiguranje	Cetinje	Lovćen Sports Center	1,500
NIS Vojvodina	Novi Sad	SPC Vojvodina	7,022
Partizan ICN	Belgrade	Pionir Hall	5,878
Radnički Jugopetrol	Belgrade	SC Šumice	2,000
Sloga Telekom Srbija	Kraljevo	Kraljevo Sports Hall	3,000
Zdravlje	Leskovac	SRC Dubočica	3,600

=== Personnel and sponsorship ===
Club	Head coach	Captain	Kit manufacturer	Shirt sponsor
Beopetrol	Vojislav Vezović		Champion	Beopetrol
Borac Čačak	Dejan Mijatović			
Budućnost	Miroslav Nikolić / Bogdan Tanjević	Dragan Vukčević	Adidas	Montenegro Airlines
Crvena zvezda	Stevan Karadžić / Miroslav Nikolić	Miloš Vujanić	Rang	Delta Banka
FMP Železnik	Aleksandar Petrović		Nike	
Hemofarm	Željko Lukajić			Hemofarm
Lovćen osiguranje	Miodrag Kadija	Marko Ivanović		Lovćen osiguranje
NIS Vojvodina	Srđan Antić / Milovan Stepandić			Naftna Industrija Srbije
Partizan ICN	Darko Ruso	Miroslav Berić	Adidas	ICN
Radnički Jugopetrol	Duško Vujošević		Sportstar	Jugopetrol
Sloga Telekom Srbija				Telekom Srbija
Zdravlje	Jovica Arsić			

== Regular season ==
=== Standings ===
Pos	Team	Pld	W	L	PF	PA	PD	Pts	Qualification or relegation
1	Budućnost	22	21	1	2036	1718	+318	43	Qualification to Playoffs
2	Partizan ICN	22	15	7	1851	1797	+54	37	Qualification to Playoffs
3	FMP Železnik	22	14	8	1790	1715	+75	36	Qualification to Playoffs
4	Lovćen osiguranje	22	13	9	1762	1747	+15	35	Qualification to Playoffs
5	Zdravlje	22	12	10	1874	1817	+57	34	Qualification to Playoffs
6	Hemofarm	22	10	12	1793	1777	+16	32	Qualification to Playoffs
7	Radnički Jugopetrol	22	10	12	1732	1754	−22	32	Qualification to Playoffs
8	NIS Vojvodina	22	9	13	1768	1873	−105	31	Qualification to Playoffs
9	Sloga Telekom Srbija	22	9	13	1796	1854	−58	31	
10	Crvena zvezda	22	8	14	1788	1873	−85	30	
11	Borac Čačak	22	6	16	1696	1848	−152	28	Relegation to YUBA B League
12	Beopetrol	22	5	17	1887	2000	−113	27	Relegation to YUBA B League

Source: kosarka.co.yu, srbija-info.gov.rs

== Playoffs ==
=== Bracket ===
Quarterfinals
21–23 April
Budućnost	2
NIS Vojvodina	0
21–23 April
Lovćen osiguranje	2
Zdravlje	0
21–26 April
Partizan ICN	2
Radnički Jugopetrol	1
21–26 April
FMP Železnik	1
Hemofarm	2

Semifinals
29 April – 4 May
Budućnost	3
Lovćen osiguranje	0
29 April – 4 May
Partizan ICN	3
Hemofarm	0

Finals
13–23 May
Budućnost	3
Partizan ICN	2

== Clubs in European competitions ==
Competition	Team	Progress	Result
Euroleague	Budućnost	Round of 16	Eliminated by (Spain) Real Madrid Teka, 0–2
FIBA SuproLeague	Partizan ICN	Round of 16	Eliminated by (France) ASVEL, 1–2
FIBA Saporta Cup	Crvena zvezda	Top 16	Eliminated by (Belgium) Telindus Racing Antwerpen, 89–113 (0–2)
FIBA Korać Cup	FMP Železnik	Round of 32 – Group C	4th (2–4)
FIBA Korać Cup	Hemofarm	Runners-up	Lost to (Spain) Unicaja, 116–148 (0–2)
FIBA Korać Cup	NIS Vojvodina	Round of 32 – Group D	4th (0–6)

== All-Star Game ==
The 2001 YUBA All-Star Game took place this season. Some well known players who featured in the All-Star Game were Mladen Šekularac, Dejan Milojevic, Aleksandar Nađfeji, Ognjen Aškrabić, Stevan Nađfeji, Žarko Čabarkapa , Dusan Kecman, Goran Nikolić , Vladimir Tica , Nebojša Bogavac , Goran Ćakić.

== See also ==
- 2000–01 Yugoslav Basketball Cup
