= 1998–99 YUBA League =

7th edition of YUBA League

1998–99 Winston YUBA League
- League: YUBA League
- Season: 1998–99
- Games played: 22 each
- Teams: 12

Finals
- Champions: Budućnost
- Runners-up: Crvena zvezda

Seasons
- ← 1997–98 1999–2000 →

The 1998–99 Winston YUBA League (Serbian Cyrillic: Винстон ЈУБА лига 1998/99.) was the 7th season of the YUBA League, the top-tier professional basketball league in Yugoslavia (later renamed to Serbia and Montenegro).

== Teams ==
A total of 12 teams participated in the 1998–99 Winston YUBA League.

=== Distribution ===
The following is the access list for this season.

Access list for the 1998–99 Winston YUBA League
	Teams entering in this round	Teams advancing from the previous round
Regular season (12 teams)	10 highest-placed teams from the previous season; 2 highest-placed teams from the B League	
Playoffs (8 teams)		8 highest-placed teams from the Regular season

=== Promotion and relegation ===
Teams promoted from the YUBA B League

- Hemofarm
- Zdravlje

Teams relegated to the YUBA B League

- OKK Beograd
- Borovica
- Vojvodina
- Mornar

=== Venues and locations ===
Location of clubs in the 1998–99 season

Club	Home city	Arena	Capacity
Beobanka	Belgrade	New Belgrade Sports Hall	5,000
Beopetrol	Belgrade	New Belgrade Sports Hall	5,000
Budućnost	Podgorica	Morača Hall	4,300
Crvena zvezda	Belgrade	Pionir Hall	5,878
FMP Železnik	Belgrade	Železnik Hall	3,000
Hemofarm	Vršac	Millennium Centar	5,000
Iva Zorka	Šabac	Zorka Hall	2,300
Lovćen	Cetinje	Lovćen Sports Center	1,500
Partizan	Belgrade	Pionir Hall	5,878
Radnički Beograd	Belgrade	SC Šumice	2,000
Spartak	Subotica	Dudova Šuma Hall	3,000
Zdravlje	Leskovac	SRC Dubočica	3,600

=== Personnel and sponsorship ===
Club	Head coach	Captain	Kit manufacturer	Shirt sponsor
Beobanka	Darko Ruso	Ivan Cimbaljević	Sportstar	Beobanka
Beopetrol	Zoran Krečković		Champion	Beopetrol
Budućnost	Miroslav Nikolić		Nike	
Crvena zvezda	Borislav Džaković / Jovica Antonić	Milenko Topić	Nike	Delta Banka
FMP Železnik	Boško Đokić / Aleksandar Petrović			
Hemofarm	Željko Lukajić			Hemofarm
Iva Zorka				
Lovćen	Miodrag Kadija			
Partizan	Vladislav Lučić		Nike	
Radnički Beograd	Rajko Toroman		NAAI	Jugopetrol
Spartak	Srećko Sekulović			
Zdravlje	Jovica Arsić			

== Regular season ==
=== Standings ===
Pos	Team	Pld	W	L	PF	PA	PD	Pts	Qualification or relegation	BUD	CZV	PAR	RAD	BBA	BPE	FMP	SPA	LOV	HEM	ZDR	IVA
1	Budućnost Hipotekarna banka	22	20	2	1762	1523	+239	42	Champions	—		75–59	93–77	89–66	80–74		87–76	83–66	65–61	85–74	
2	Crvena zvezda	22	19	3	1794	1562	+232	41	Runners-up	73–67	—	84–72	89–77	79–69		77–60	87–63	74–53	77–67		104–74
3	Partizan Zepter	22	16	6	1926	1694	+232	38		74–84	84–85	—	74–63	73–61	93–71	81–68	89–82	67–64	105–78	95–70	102–61
4	Radnički Jugopetrol	22	13	9	1778	1762	+16	35		67–101	91–96	104–95	—	66–70	82–78		85–77			92–66	106–90
5	Beobanka	22	11	11	1632	1573	+59	33		62–63	75–79	74–78		—	99–95	65–59	75–77		68–57	66–50	102–66
6	Beopetrol	22	11	11	1709	1684	+25	33		78–85	76–77	86–101			—	73–65	72–71	81–68	74–64	71–60	
7	FMP Železnik	22	11	11	1646	1569	+77	33		63–72	73–72	102–94	77–84		69–62	—	73–61		76–74	71–62	
8	Spartak	22	9	13	1645	1686	−41	31		56–59	89–83	66–101		80–88			—	83–71		69–60	83–61
9	Lovćen	22	9	13	1455	1555	−100	31		73–70		61–70	59–63	59–52	64–74	67–92	67–65	—		47–51	
10	Hemofarm	22	7	15	1561	1628	−67	29			58–72	73–97	75–79	82–73	81–59		91–68	62–66	—		92–64
11	Zdravlje	22	5	17	1512	1689	−177	27	Relegation to YUBA B League		63–79	73–95		53–77	79–73		80–88	57–71	64–68	—	113–77
12	Iva Zorka	22	1	21	1678	2175	−497	23	Relegation to YUBA B League	77–110	86–111	109–127	75–83	69–86	68–96	73–101		83–97	86–87		—

Source: kosarka.co.yu

== Playoffs ==
The playoffs were not played due to the NATO bombing of Yugoslavia (March–June 1999) and then top-seeded Budućnost was awarded with the championships title.

== Clubs in European competitions ==
Competition	Team	Progress	Result
FIBA EuroLeague	Crvena zvezda	Second round – Group E	6th (4–12)
FIBA Saporta Cup	Partizan Zepter	Quarterfinals	Eliminated by (Italy) Benetton Treviso, 150–163 (0-1–1)
FIBA Saporta Cup	Budućnost HB	Semifinals	Eliminated by (Italy) Benetton Treviso, 96–60 (0–2)
FIBA Korać Cup	FMP Železnik	Regular season – Group D	3rd (3–3)
FIBA Korać Cup	Lovćen	Regular season – Group M	3rd (1–5)
FIBA Korać Cup	Beobanka	Regular season – Group P	3rd (3–3)
FIBA Korać Cup	Radnički Jugopetrol	Round of 16	Eliminated by (Greece) Panionios Nutella, 145–169 (0–2)

== All-Star Game ==
The 1999 YUBA All-Star Game took place this season. Some well known players who featured in the All-Star Game were Mladen Šekularac, Dejan Milojević, Dejan Tomašević, Nenad Čanak, Veselin Petrović, Aleksandar Nađfeji, Jovo Stanojević, Vladimir Kuzmanović, Igor Rakočević and Đuro Ostojić.

== See also ==
- 1998–99 ACB season
- 1998–99 Slovenian Basketball League
