= 1999–2000 YUBA League =

8th edition of YUBA League

1999–2000 Winston YUBA League
- League: YUBA League
- Season: 1999–2000
- Dates: N/A (Regular season); 8 April – 7 May 2000 (Playoffs)
- Games played: 22 each
- Teams: 12

Regular season
- Top seed: Budućnost, 22–0

Finals
- Champions: Budućnost
- Runners-up: Partizan
- Semifinalists: Crvena zvezda Hemofarm

Statistical leaders
Points	(Federal Republic of Yugoslavia) Branko Milisavljević	25.1
Rebounds	(Federal Republic of Yugoslavia) Dejan Milojević	9.9
Assists	(Federal Republic of Yugoslavia) Dragan Lukovski	3.4

Seasons
- ← 1998–99 2000–01 →

The 1999–2000 Winston YUBA League (Serbian Cyrillic: Винстон ЈУБА лига 1999/2000.) was the 8th season of the YUBA League, the top-tier professional basketball league in Yugoslavia (later renamed to Serbia and Montenegro).

== Teams ==
A total of 12 teams participated in the 1999–2000 Winston YUBA League.

=== Distribution ===
The following is the access list for this season.

Access list for the 1999–2000 Winston YUBA League
	Teams entering in this round	Teams advancing from the previous round
Regular season (12 teams)	10 highest-placed teams from the previous season; 2 highest-placed teams from the B League	
Playoffs (8 teams)		8 highest-placed teams from the Regular season

=== Promotion and relegation ===
Teams promoted from the YUBA B League

- Borac Čačak
- Ibon

Teams relegated to the YUBA B League

- Zdravlje
- Iva Zorka

=== Venues and locations ===
Location of clubs in the 1999–2000 season

Club	Home city	Arena	Capacity
Beobanka	Belgrade	New Belgrade Sports Hall	5,000
Beopetrol	Belgrade	New Belgrade Sports Hall	5,000
Borac Čačak	Čačak	Borac Hall	3,000
Budućnost	Podgorica	Morača Hall	4,300
Crvena zvezda	Belgrade	Pionir Hall	5,878
FMP Železnik	Belgrade	Železnik Hall	3,000
Hemofarm	Vršac	Millennium Centar	5,000
Ibon Nikšić	Nikšić	Nikšić Sports Center	3,000
Lovćen	Cetinje	Lovćen Sports Center	1,500
Partizan	Belgrade	Pionir Hall	5,878
Radnički Jugopetrol	Belgrade	SC Šumice	2,000
Spartak	Subotica	Dudova Šuma Hall	3,000

=== Personnel and sponsorship ===
Club	Head coach	Captain	Kit manufacturer	Shirt sponsor
Beobanka	Darko Ruso	Ivan Cimbaljević	Sportstar	Beobanka
Beopetrol	Zoran Krečković / Slobodan Klipa		Champion	Beopetrol
Borac Čačak	Milovan Stepandić			
Budućnost	Miroslav Nikolić			Montenegro Airlines
Crvena zvezda	Jovica Antonić / Momir Milatović / Vladislav Lučić / Stevan Karadžić	Saša Obradović	Nike	Delta Banka
FMP Železnik	Aleksandar Petrović			
Hemofarm	Željko Lukajić			Hemofarm
Ibon Nikšić	(North Macedonia) Janko Lukovski			
Lovćen	Miodrag Kadija			
Partizan	Nenad Trajković		Nike	
Radnički Jugopetrol	Duško Vujošević			
Spartak	Srećko Sekulović			

== Regular season ==
=== Standings ===
Pos	Team	Pld	W	L	PF	PA	PD	Pts	Qualification or relegation	BUD	PAR	CZV	HEM	BBA	FMP	RAD	BOR	LOV	BPE	SPA	IBO
1	Budućnost	22	22	0	1774	1434	+340	44	Qualification to Playoffs	—	68–66	89–67	74–68	80–60	84–74	96–77	80–67	85–68	88–74	109–84	82–65
2	Partizan	22	16	6	1654	1571	+83	38	Qualification to Playoffs	70–82	—	80–74	77–84	68–71	90–87	73–67	87–83	71–58	84–68	74–48	90–64
3	Crvena zvezda	22	15	7	1696	1601	+95	37	Qualification to Playoffs	71–92	69–54	—	90–85	83–77	63–62	78–77	73–71	81–66	84–62	71–57	61–52
4	Hemofarm	22	13	9	1647	1553	+94	35	Qualification to Playoffs	70–73	73–83	65–64	—	64–52	80–60	88–77	81–69	87–70	78–76	75–65	88–72
5	Beobanka	22	13	9	1607	1611	−4	35	Qualification to Playoffs	67–72	63–74	53–64	78–69	—	82–75	82–79	84–79	63–56	84–71	77–55	76–65
6	FMP Železnik	22	12	10	1668	1603	+65	34	Qualification to Playoffs	60–67	65–66	95–84	60–57	70–66	—	99–72	64–72	57–56	94–87	83–62	92–74
7	Radnički Jugopetrol	22	10	12	1563	1560	+3	32	Qualification to Playoffs	72–94	73–57	62–73	82–86	76–64	57–58	—	74–65	79–56	89–86	69–66	93–51
8	Borac Čačak	22	9	13	1695	1679	+16	31	Qualification to Playoffs		73–75	85–97	70–82	85–71	94–97	85–76	—	72–67	86–69	97–71	82–61
9	Lovćen	22	8	14	1446	1581	−135	30		51–101	66–70	65–57	67–66	78–73	56–85		80–67	—	57–78	72–55	83–91
10	Beopetrol	22	7	15	1750	1794	−44	29		75–89	85–86	107–100	73–68	92–94	82–90	84–67	77–78	70–83	—	89–67	75–71
11	Spartak	22	4	18	1467	1703	−236	26	Relegation to YUBA B League	69–81	74–78	66–97	56–67	79–82	74–68	67–69	81–75	64–67	82–71	—	80–77
12	Ibon	22	3	19	1500	1777	−277	25	Relegation to YUBA B League	66–102	76–81	79–95	71–66	77–82	72–79	92–94	50–72	44–60	75–99	55–45	—

Source: kosarka.co.yu

Source: Srbija-info

== Playoffs ==
=== Bracket ===
Quarterfinals
8–10 April
Budućnost	2
Borac Čačak	0
8–10 April
Hemofarm	2
Beobanka	0
8–10 April
Partizan	2
Radnički Jugopetrol	0
8–10 April
Crvena zvezda	2
FMP Železnik	0

Semifinals
15–19 April
Budućnost	3
Hemofarm	0
15–23 April
Partizan	3
Crvena zvezda	2

Finals
2–7 May
Budućnost	3
Partizan	0

== Clubs in European competitions ==
Competition	Team	Progress	Result
FIBA EuroLeague	Crvena zvezda	Second round – Group F	6th (2–14)
FIBA EuroLeague	Budućnost	Top 16	Eliminated by (Greece) Panathinaikos, 1–2
FIBA Saporta Cup	Partizan	Group E	5th (5–5)
FIBA Saporta Cup	Radnički Jugopetrol	Round of 32	Eliminated by (Turkey) Darüşşafaka, 137–141 (1–1)
FIBA Korać Cup	FMP Železnik	Second round – Group O	Withdrew
FIBA Korać Cup	Spartak	Second round – Group M	Withdrew
FIBA Korać Cup	Beopetrol	Second round – Group C	Withdrew

== All-Star Game ==
The 2000 YUBA All-Star Game took place this season. Some well known players who featured in the All-Star Game were Mladen Šekularac, Dejan Milojevic, Dejan Tomasevic, Vlado Scepanovic, Nenad Canak, Veselin Petrovic, Jovo Stanojević, Nikola Jestratijević, Dragan Lukovski, Ognjen Aškrabić, Milenko Topic.

== See also ==
- 1999–2000 ACB season
- 1999–2000 Greek Basket League
- 1999–2000 Slovenian Basketball League
