= 2001–02 YUBA League =

10th edition of YUBA League

2001–02 Winston YUBA League
- League: YUBA League
- Season: 2001–02
- Dates: 14 October 2001 – 20 April 2002 (Regular season); 9 May – 6 June 2002 (Playoffs)
- Games played: 22 each
- Teams: 12

Regular season
- Top seed: Budućnost, 18–4
- Season MVP: (Federal Republic of Yugoslavia) Jovo Stanojević

Finals
- Champions: Partizan ICN
- Runners-up: Budućnost
- Semifinalists: FMP Železnik; Hemofarm

Statistical leaders
Points	(Federal Republic of Yugoslavia) Zlatko Bolić	20.7
Rebounds	(Federal Republic of Yugoslavia) Savo Đikanović	10.1
Assists	(Federal Republic of Yugoslavia) Miljan Pavković	6.1

Seasons
- ← 2000–01 2002–03 →

The 2001–02 Winston YUBA League (Serbian Cyrillic: Винстон ЈУБА лига 2001/02.) was the 10th season of the YUBA League, the top-tier professional basketball league in Yugoslavia (later renamed to Serbia and Montenegro).

== Regular season ==
=== Standings ===
Pos	Team	Pld	W	L	PF	PA	PD	Pts	Qualification or relegation
1	Budućnost	22	18	4	1895	1747	+148	40	Qualification to Playoffs
2	Partizan ICN	22	18	4	1933	1682	+251	40	Qualification to Playoffs
3	FMP Železnik	22	16	6	1914	1709	+205	38	Qualification to Playoffs
4	Hemofarm	22	13	9	1652	1611	+41	35	Qualification to Playoffs
5	Lovćen	22	12	10	1804	1788	+16	34	Qualification to Playoffs
6	NIS Vojvodina	22	11	11	1876	1860	+16	33	Qualification to Playoffs
7	Crvena zvezda	22	10	12	1783	1774	+9	32	Qualification to Playoffs
8	Zdravlje	22	9	13	1765	1741	+24	31	Qualification to Playoffs
9	Spartak	22	9	13	1676	1755	−79	31	
10	Sloga	22	9	13	1671	1801	−130	31	
11	Primorka Bar	22	6	16	1742	1935	−193	28	Relegation to YUBA B League
12	Radnički Jugopetrol	22	1	21	1588	1896	−308	23	Relegation to YUBA B League

Source: kosarka.co.yu, srbijasport.net

== Playoffs ==
=== Bracket ===
Quarterfinals
9–12 May
Budućnost	2
Zdravlje	0
9–14 May
Hemofarm	2
Lovćen	1
9–12 May
Partizan ICN	2
Crvena zvezda	0
9–14 May
FMP Železnik	2
NIS Vojvodina	1

Semifinals
17–27 May
Budućnost	3
Hemofarm	2
17–24 May
Partizan ICN	3
FMP Železnik	1

Finals
1–6 June
Budućnost	0
Partizan ICN	3

=== Quarterfinals ===
Team 1	Series	Team 2	Game 1	Game 2	Game 3
Budućnost	2–0	Zdravlje	92–67	94–90	—
Hemofarm	2–1	Lovćen	81–78	68–76	80–73
Partizan ICN	2–0	Crvena zvezda	91–72	77–71	—
FMP Železnik	2–1	NIS Vojvodina	99–76	89–95	94–72

=== Semifinals ===
Team 1	Series	Team 2	Game 1	Game 2	Game 3	Game 4	Game 5
Budućnost	3–2	Hemofarm	90–79	96–92	73–84	96–98	99–78
Partizan ICN	3–1	FMP Železnik	82–74	61–74	95–90	107–102	—

=== Finals ===
Team 1	Series	Team 2	Game 1	Game 2	Game 3	Game 4	Game 5
Budućnost	0–3	Partizan	84–85	66–74	80–104	—	—

== See also ==
- Federal Republic of Yugoslavia Basketball Cup
