= 1997–98 YUBA League =

6th edition of YUBA League

1997–98 Winston YUBA League
- League: YUBA League
- Season: 1997–98
- Games played: 26 each
- Teams: 14

Regular season
- Top seed: Partizan, 24–2
- Season MVP: Mijailo Grušanović

Finals
- Champions: Crvena zvezda
- Runners-up: FMP Železnik

Awards
- Most Improved Player: (Federal Republic of Yugoslavia) Igor Rakočević

Seasons
- ← 1996–97 1998–99 →

The 1997–98 Winston YUBA League (Serbian Cyrillic: Винстон ЈУБА лига 1997/98.) was the 6th season of the YUBA League, the top-tier professional basketball league in Yugoslavia (later renamed to Serbia and Montenegro).

== Teams ==
A total of 14 teams participated in the 1997–98 Winston YUBA League.

=== Distribution ===
The following is the access list for this season.

Access list for the 1997–98 Winston YUBA League
	Teams entering in this round	Teams advancing from the previous round
Regular season (14 teams)	12 highest-placed teams from the last season; 2 highest-placed teams from the B League	
Playoffs (8 teams)		8 highest-placed teams from the Regular season

=== Promotion and relegation ===
Teams promoted from the YUBA B League

- Beopetrol
- OKK Beograd

Teams relegated to the YUBA B League

- Borac Čačak
- ~~Vojvodina~~ / BFC (BFC got merged into Vojvodina)

=== Venues and locations ===
Location of clubs in the 1997–98 season

Club	Home city	Arena	Capacity
Beobanka	Belgrade	New Belgrade Sports Hall	5,000
Beopetrol	Belgrade	New Belgrade Sports Hall	5,000
Borovica	Ruma	Ruma Sports Center	2,500
Budućnost	Podgorica	Morača Hall	4,300
Crvena zvezda	Belgrade	Pionir Hall	5,878
FMP Železnik	Belgrade	Železnik Hall	3,000
Iva Zorka	Šabac	Zorka Hall	2,300
Lovćen	Cetinje	Lovćen Sports Center	1,500
Mornar	Bar		
OKK Beograd	Belgrade	SC Šumice	2,000
Partizan Zepter	Belgrade	Pionir Hall	5,878
Radnički Beograd	Belgrade	SC Šumice	2,000
Spartak	Subotica	Dudova Šuma Hall	3,000
Vojvodina	Novi Sad	SPC Vojvodina	7,022

=== Personnel and sponsorship ===
Club	Head coach	Captain	Kit manufacturer	Shirt sponsor
Beobanka	Darko Ruso		Sportstar	Beobanka
Beopetrol	Zoran Krečković		Champion	Beopetrol
Borovica	Nikola Lazić			
Budućnost	Goran Bojanić		Nike	
Crvena zvezda	(United States) Tom Ludwig / Vladislav Lučić / Mihailo Pavićević		Nike	Delta Banka
FMP Železnik	Momir Milatović		Nike	Atlas Banka
Iva Zorka	Dragan Vuković / Milovan Stepandić	Mijailo Grušanović		
Lovćen	Miodrag Kadija			
Mornar	Đorđije Pavićević			
OKK Beograd	Slobodan Nikolić			
Partizan Zepter	Miroslav Nikolić / Milovan Bogojević		Nike	Zepter
Radnički Beograd	Velimir Gašić			
Spartak	Srećko Sekulović			
Vojvodina	Željko Lukajić			

== Regular season ==
=== Standings ===
Pos	Team	Pld	W	L	PF	PA	PD	Pts	Qualification or relegation	PAR	BUD	CZV	IVA	FMP	LOV	BBA	RAD	BPE	SPA	OKK	BRU	VOJ	MOR
1	Partizan Zepter	26	24	2	2226	1850	+376	50	Qualification to Playoffs	—	89–68	78–86	78–69	81–63	76–63	77–68	90–68	101–70	98–76	104–85	91–80	85–66	84–48
2	Budućnost	26	24	2	2128	1846	+282	50	Qualification to Playoffs	74–61	—	79–70	79–63	84–81	89–61		83–69	85–61	71–65	114–85	101–81	86–72	89–54
3	Crvena zvezda	26	19	7	2168	1966	+202	45	Qualification to Playoffs	69–77	81–77	—	81–63	72–80	86–70	81–71	86–74	73–61	84–73	90–81	89–66	68–63	82–66
4	Iva Zorka	26	16	10	1951	1846	+105	42	Qualification to Playoffs	82–83	74–75	66–77	—		66–74	82–76	67–63	87–76		98–76		67–61	96–65
5	FMP Železnik	26	15	11	1944	1920	+24	41	Qualification to Playoffs	55–86	70–79	81–73	71–73	—	61–77	80–71	78–62	78–87	62–72	80–66	88–67	61–52	98–74
6	Lovćen	26	14	12	1739	1759	−20	40	Qualification to Playoffs	75–92	56–57	70–74	74–82	60–59	—	58–38	75–63	77–73	75–62	87–96	68–61	60–58	71–65
7	Beobanka	26	14	12	1777	1693	+84	40	Qualification to Playoffs	75–83	64–68	72–71	62–49	72–75	62–46	—	75–69	87–89	72–65	79–65	88–78	79–69	2–0
8	Radnički Beograd	26	13	13	1926	1938	−12	39	Qualification to Playoffs	69–77	74–82	79–78	59–65	78–87	77–58	54–73	—	92–90	89–75	108–79	72–71	57–51	69–66
9	Beopetrol	26	11	15	1992	1997	−5	37		76–87	67–71	101–105	61–63	100–75	41–54	81–73	76–79	—	73–62	104–82	88–74	64–77	86–56
10	Spartak	26	10	16	1964	1993	−29	36		81–92	83–89	100–104	78–73	73–74	54–55	75–72	82–84	82–72	—	83–77	75–55	82–75	74–61
11	OKK Beograd	26	10	16	2102	2263	−161	36	Relegation to YUBA B League	87–92	80–82	100–99		76–83	85–77	69–100	74–79	71–68		—	83–75		87–74
12	Borovica	26	6	20	1886	2109	−223	32	Relegation to YUBA B League	68–102	80–100	74–112	60–74	75–79	66–65	64–69	70–82		85–73	93–75	—	84–63	76–70
13	Vojvodina BFC	26	5	21	1732	1897	−165	31	Relegation to YUBA B League	60–70	68–77	71–78	73–71	60–70	55–60	46–60	73–68	76–81	68–76	83–89	79–85	—	63–55
14	Mornar	26	1	25	1617	2075	−458	27	Relegation to YUBA B League	69–92	78–97	70–99	67–100	63–67	60–73	42–77	59–86	73–78	67–87	75–80	71–69	67–75	—

Source: kosarka.co.yu

== Playoffs ==
=== Bracket ===
Quarterfinals
Partizan Zepter	2
Radnički Beograd	0
Iva Zorka	0
FMP Železnik	2
Budućnost	2
Beobanka	0
Crvena zvezda	2
Lovćen	0

Semifinals
Partizan Zepter	1
FMP Železnik	2
Budućnost	0
Crvena zvezda	2

Finals
FMP Železnik	1
Crvena zvezda	3

=== Quarterfinals ===
Team 1	Series	Team 2	Game 1	Game 2	Game 3
Partizan Zepter	2-0	Radnički Beograd	88-77	87-72	
Budućnost	2-0	Beobanka	73-64	88-73	
Crvena zvezda	2-0	Lovćen	79-77	89-62	
Iva Zorka	0-2	FMP Železnik	75-84	72-75	

=== Semifinals ===
Team 1	Series	Team 2	Game 1	Game 2	Game 3
Partizan Zepter	1-2	FMP Železnik	81-91	71-62	67-71 (ET)
Budućnost	0-2	Crvena zvezda	61-70	84-86	

=== Finals ===
Team 1	Series	Team 2	Game 1	Game 2	Game 3	Game 4	Game 5
Crvena zvezda	3–1	FMP Železnik	63–56	65–68	67–63	77–76	—

== Clubs in European competitions ==
Competition	Team	Progress	Result
EuroLeague	Partizan Zepter	Final Four / 4th	Eliminated in 3rd place game by (Italy) Benetton Treviso, 89–96
FIBA EuroCup	FMP Železnik	Round of 32	Eliminated by (France) ASVEL, 136–145 (1–1)
FIBA EuroCup	Beobanka	Quarterfinals	Eliminated by (Lithuania) Žalgiris, 119–137 (0–2)
FIBA Korać Cup	Crvena zvezda	Runners-up	Eliminated by (Italy) Mash Jeans Verona, 138–141 (1–1)
FIBA Korać Cup	Budućnost	Round of 16	Eliminated by (Greece) Peristeri 3Bit, 135–136 (1–1)
FIBA Korać Cup	Spartak	Qualifying round	Eliminated by (Bulgaria) Cherno More, 168–186 (1–1)
FIBA Korać Cup	Vojvodina	Regular season – Group M	3rd (3–3)

== All-Star Game ==
The 1998 YUBA All-Star Game took place in Belgrade with Vladimir Petrović being the slam-dunk winner. Other known players who featured in the All-Star Game were Vlado Scepanovic, Milenko Topic and Aleksandar Glintić.

== See also ==
- 1997–98 ACB season
- 1997–98 Slovenian Basketball League
