= 2003–04 YUBA League =

12th edition of YUBA League

2003–04 Efes Pils YUBA League^{1}
- League: YUBA League
- Season: 2003–04
- Dates: 11 October 2003 – 19 March 2004 (Regular season); 31 March – 26 May 2004 (Super League); 1–19 June 2004 (Playoffs)
- Teams: 16

Super League
- Top seed: Partizan Mobtel, 12–2
- Season MVP: (Serbia and Montenegro) Dejan Milojević

Finals
- Champions: Partizan Mobtel
- Runners-up: Hemofarm
- Semifinalists: Crvena zvezda NIS Vojvodina
- Finals MVP: (Serbia and Montenegro) Vlado Šćepanović

Seasons
- ← 2002–03 2004–05 →
- ^{1} Sponsored league name, referring to Efes Pils.

The 2003–04 YUBA League (also known as 2003–04 Efes Pils YUBA League for sponsorship reasons) was the 12th season of the YUBA League, the top-tier professional basketball league in Serbia and Montenegro.

The first part of the season consisted of 12 teams and was played by all clubs that had qualified for it, except those participating in the ABA League (Reflex, Crvena zvezda, Budućnost, and Lovćen).

In the second part, the four teams competing in the ABA League joined the competition, and together with the top four clubs from the first phase, they formed the Super League (a total of 8 teams).

== Regular season ==
=== Standings ===
Pos	Team	Pld	W	L	PF	PA	PD	Pts	Qualification or relegation
1	Partizan Mobtel	22	20	2	2003	1639	+364	42	Qualification to Super League
2	Hemofarm	22	19	3	2008	1674	+334	41	Qualification to Super League
3	NIS Vojvodina	22	17	5	1895	1674	+221	39	Qualification to Super League
4	Lavovi 063	22	12	10	1833	1760	+73	34	Qualification to Super League
5	Sloga Favorit VM	22	12	10	1791	1856	−65	34	
6	Zdravlje	22	11	11	1767	1834	−67	33	
7	OKK Beograd	22	10	12	1848	1822	+26	32	
8	Atlas	22	10	12	1911	1866	+45	32	
9	Ergonom Best	22	8	14	1893	1963	−70	30	
10	Mašinac	22	8	14	1763	1918	−155	30	
11	Sinalco Spartak	22	4	18	1688	1954	−266	26	
12	Zastava	22	1	21	1617	2057	−440	23	Relegation to YUBA B League

Source: kosarka.co.yu, srbijasport.net

== Super League ==
=== Standings ===
Pos	Team	Pld	W	L	PF	PA	PD	Pts	Qualification or relegation
1	Partizan Mobtel	14	12	2	1251	1099	+152	26	Qualification to Playoffs
2	Crvena zvezda	14	10	4	1250	1172	+78	24	Qualification to Playoffs
3	Hemofarm	14	9	5	1203	1169	+34	23	Qualification to Playoffs
4	NIS Vojvodina	14	9	5	1231	1172	+59	23	Qualification to Playoffs
5	Budućnost	14	8	6	1293	1246	+47	22	
6	Reflex	14	5	9	1198	1177	+21	19	
7	Lavovi 063	14	3	11	996	1151	−155	17	
8	Lovćen CKB	14	0	14	1049	1285	−236	14	

Source: kosarka.co.yu, srbijasport.net

== Playoffs ==
=== Bracket ===
Semifinals
1–3 June
Partizan Mobtel	2
NIS Vojvodina	0
2–4 June
Crvena zvezda	0
Hemofarm	2

Finals
9–19 June
Partizan Mobtel	3
Hemofarm	1

=== Semifinals ===
Team 1	Series	Team 2	Game 1	Game 2	Game 3
Partizan Mobtel	2–0	NIS Vojvodina	76–72	84–83	—
Crvena zvezda	0–2	Hemofarm	86–88	0–20	—

=== Finals ===
Team 1	Series	Team 2	Game 1	Game 2	Game 3	Game 4	Game 5
Partizan Mobtel	3–1	Hemofarm	89–70	85–81	80–92	79–77	—

== See also ==
- 2003–04 Radivoj Korać Cup
