= Dušan Kecman =

Serbian basketball player

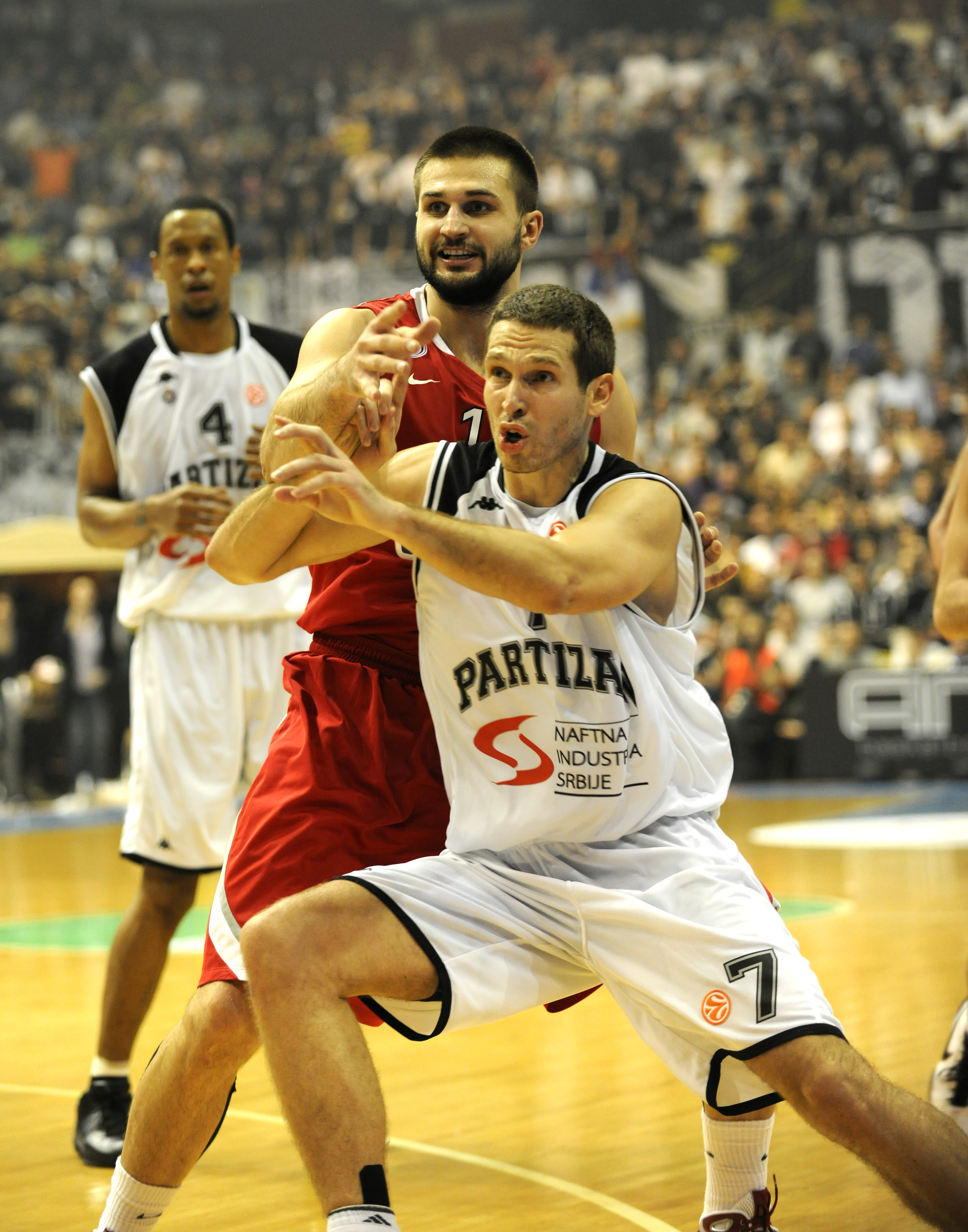
- Kecman (7) playing for Partizan in November 2009

Personal information
- Born: November 6, 1977 (age 49) Belgrade, SR Serbia, SFR Yugoslavia
- Listed height: 6 ft 5.75 in (1.97 m)
- Listed weight: 205 lb (93 kg)

Career information
- NBA draft: 1999: undrafted
- Playing career: 1996–2013
- Position: Small forward / shooting guard
- Number: 5, 7, 8
- Coaching career: 2015–2017

Career history

Playing
- 1996–2001: Beopetrol
- 2001–2002: FMP
- 2002–2004: Partizan
- 2004: Makedonikos
- 2004–2005: Efes Pilsen
- 2005: Oostende
- 2005–2006: Kyiv
- 2006–2008: Partizan
- 2008–2009: Panathinaikos
- 2009–2012: Partizan
- 2012–2013: Chorale Roanne
- 2013: Monaco

Coaching
- 2015–2017: Partizan (assistant)

Career highlights
- As player: EuroLeague champion (2009); 4× ABA League champion (2007, 2008, 2010, 2011); 2× YUBA League champion (2003, 2004); YUBA League MVP (2001); 5× Serbian League champion (2007, 2008, 2010–2012); 4× Serbian Cup winner (2008, 2010–2012); Greek League champion (2009); Greek Cup winner (2009)

Dušan Kecman (Serbian Cyrillic: Душан Кецман; born November 6, 1977) is a Serbian former professional basketball player and coach. During his playing career, he played both shooting guard and small forward positions.

== Club career ==
Kecman started his basketball career with KK Beopetrol and he stayed there until the summer of 2001. He then transferred to FMP Železnik where he spent the entire 2001–02 season. In the summer of 2002, he moved to Partizan Belgrade and stayed there for two full seasons before leaving in the summer of 2004.

During the 2004–05 season he played for Makedonikos, Efes Pilsen and Oostende. In July 2004, Kecman signed with Greek team Makedonikos that will participate in the ULEB Cup next season. In December 2004, Kecman, along with teammate Dušan Jelić, decided to leave the club because of problems with payments. Only two weeks after, he signed with EFES Pilsen. Only a few months later, Kecman parted ways with the Turkish club and signed with Oostende, the last club he played for in that season.

He played the 2005–06 season in Ukraine for Kyiv. In July 2006, he moved back to Partizan Belgrade.

On July 1, 2008, Kecman signed a two-year contract with the Greek League club Panathinaikos. On 16 June 2009, he was waived by the club after only one season.

He signed with Partizan Belgrade again on September 1, 2009. In 2010 he was involved in a memorable moment as he shot a last-second buzzer beater against Cibona as Partizan won the Adriatic League.

In August 2012 he signed a one-year contract with French team Chorale Roanne Basket. In August 2013, he signed with AS Monaco Basket. He was released after only four games.

== Post–playing career ==
In September 2015, following the departure of Duško Vujošević, Kecman was named an assistant coach to the new team's head coach Petar Božić, with whom he played together in many title runs with Partizan.

In 2017, Kecman was named the team manager of Partizan. In August 2021, Partizan parted ways with him.

== Career statistics ==
Legend
GP	Games played	GS	Games started	MPG	Minutes per game
FG%	Field-goal percentage	3P%	3-point field-goal percentage	FT%	Free-throw percentage
RPG	Rebounds per game	APG	Assists per game	SPG	Steals per game
BPG	Blocks per game	PPG	Points per game	PIR	Performance index rating
**Bold**	Career high

=== EuroLeague ===
†	Denotes season in which Kecman won the EuroLeague
*	Led the league

Year	Team	GP	GS	MPG	FG%	3P%	FT%	RPG	APG	SPG	BPG	PPG	PIR
2002–03	Partizan	14	8	27.9	.506	.333	.833	3.7	1.5	1.4	**.4**	10.1	10.1
2003–04	Partizan	13	12	**28.8**	.500	.409	.754	4.5	1.7	**1.6**	.1	**12.4**	12.5
2004–05	Efes	15	3	16.5	.316	.217	.778	2.1	.3	.9	.2	2.9	2.3
2006–07	Partizan	20	**19**	24.2	.455	.311	.897	4.0	1.6	1.5	.3	7.1	7.8
2007–08	Partizan	**23**	15	26.5	**.512**	.373	.758	**5.0**	**2.0**	1.0	—	10.9	**12.6**
2008–09†	Panathinaikos	18	2	8.5	.464	.438	**1.000**	1.2	.8	.4	.2	2.1	1.8
2009–10	Partizan	22*	17	24.0	.482	**.451**	.765	3.3	1.3	.6	.1	9.6	8.5
2010–11	Partizan	16	12	25.5	.389	.192	.829	3.9	1.8	.6	.1	7.7	6.3
2011–12	Partizan	10	0	15.6	.489	.385	.929	2.5	1.3	.2	—	6.2	7.1
Career		151	88	22.2	.469	.353	.802	3.4	1.4	.9	.2	7.8	7.8

== Awards and accomplishments ==
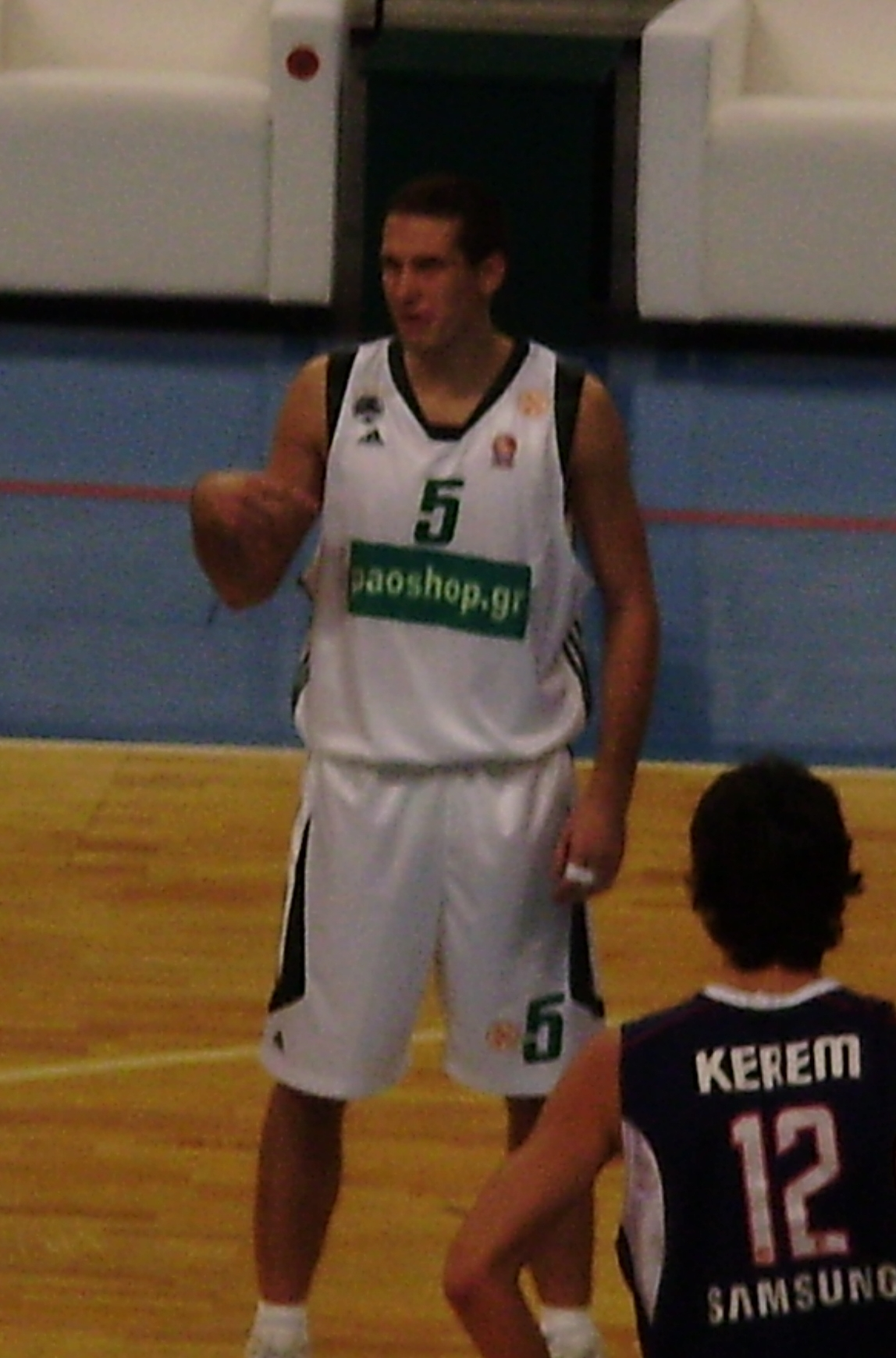
Kecman with Panathinaikos

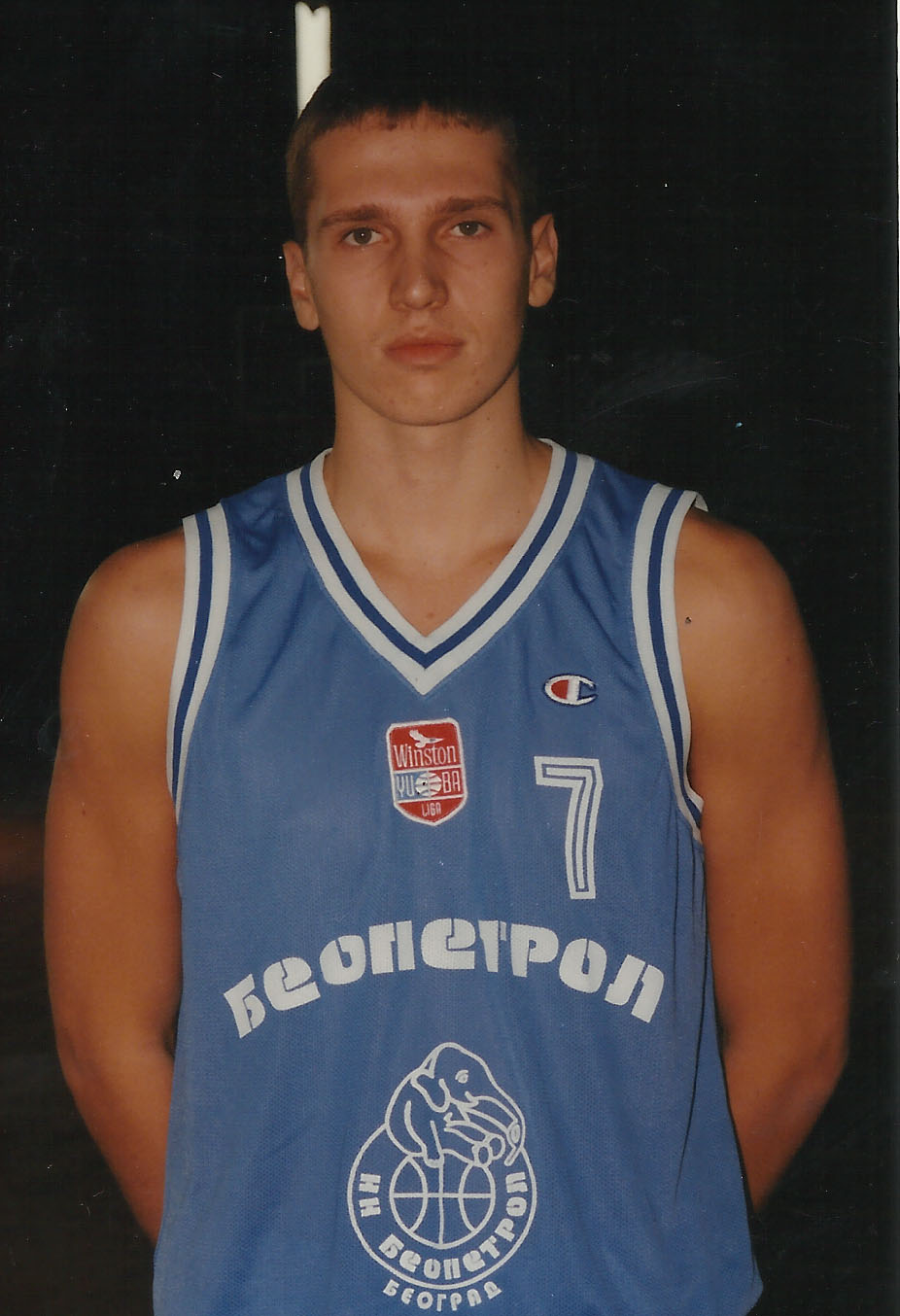
Kecman with Beopetrol

- Yugoslavian League MVP (2001)
- Won 7 Serbian Championships (2003, 2004, 2007, 2008, 2010, 2011, 2012)
- Won 4 Serbian Cups (2008, 2010, 2011, 2012)
- Won 4 Adriatic Championships (2007, 2008, 2010, 2011)
- Won the Greek Cup (2009)
- Won the Greek Championship (2009)
- Won the Euroleague Championship (2009)
- Won the Triple Crown (2009)
