= 2004–05 YUBA League =

13th edition of YUBA League

2004–05 Atlas Pils YUBA League^{1}
- League: YUBA League
- Season: 2004–05
- Dates: 10 October 2004 – April 2005 (Regular season); 16 April – 8 June 2005 (Super League); 14–26 June 2005 (Playoffs)
- Teams: 19

Super League
- Top seed: Partizan Pivara MB, 11–3

Finals
- Champions: Partizan Pivara MB
- Runners-up: Hemofarm
- Semifinalists: Reflex; Crvena zvezda
- Finals MVP: (Serbia and Montenegro) Dejan Milojević

Seasons
- ← 2003–04 2005–06 →
- ^{1} Sponsored league name, referring to Atlas Pils.

The 2004–05 YUBA League (also known as 2004–05 Atlas Pils YUBA League for sponsorship reasons) was the 13th season of the YUBA League, the top-tier professional basketball league in Serbia and Montenegro.

The first part of the season consisted of 14 teams and was played by all clubs that had qualified for it, except those participating in the ABA League (Partizan, Hemofarm, Crvena zvezda, Budućnost, and Reflex).

In the second part, the five teams competing in the ABA League joined the competition, and together with the top three clubs from the first phase, they formed the Super League (a total of 8 teams).

== Regular season ==
=== Standings ===
Pos	Team	Pld	W	L	PF	PA	PD	Pts	Qualification or relegation
1	NIS Vojvodina	26	20	6	2221	2072	+149	46	Qualification to Super League
2	Atlas	26	18	8	2160	2062	+98	44	Qualification to Super League
3	Sloga	26	15	11	2198	2228	−30	41	Qualification to Super League
4	OKK Beograd	26	15	11	2248	2154	+94	41	
5	Zdravlje	26	14	12	2360	2277	+83	40	
6	Ergonom	26	14	12	2215	2217	−2	40	
7	Mornar	26	14	12	2277	2262	+15	40	
8	Borac	26	14	12	2250	2158	+92	40	
9	Mašinac	26	13	13	2190	2176	+14	39	
10	Swisslion Takovo	26	13	13	2111	2070	+41	39	Relegation to YUBA B League
11	Nikšić	26	11	15	2183	2279	−96	37	Relegation to YUBA B League
12	Sinalco Spartak	26	8	18	2160	2334	−174	34	Relegation to YUBA B League
13	Lovćen CKB	26	7	19	2142	2262	−120	33	Relegation to YUBA B League
14	Lavovi 063	26	6	20	2105	2269	−164	32	Relegation to YUBA B League

Source: kosarka.co.yu, srbijasport.net

== Super League ==
=== Standings ===
Pos	Team	Pld	W	L	PF	PA	PD	Pts	Qualification or relegation
1	Partizan Pivara MB	14	11	3	1282	1158	+124	25	Qualification to Playoffs
2	Hemofarm	14	11	3	1323	1169	+154	25	Qualification to Playoffs
3	Reflex	14	10	4	1206	1096	+110	24	Qualification to Playoffs
4	Crvena zvezda	14	9	5	1279	1220	+59	23	Qualification to Playoffs
5	NIS Vojvodina	14	6	8	1193	1190	+3	20	
6	Atlas	14	5	9	1132	1208	−76	19	
7	Budućnost	14	3	11	1128	1236	−108	17	
8	Sloga	14	1	13	1128	1394	−266	15	

Source: kosarka.co.yu, srbijasport.net

== Playoffs ==
=== Bracket ===
Semifinals
14–16 June
Partizan Pivara MB	2
Crvena zvezda	0
14–16 June
Hemofarm	2
Reflex	0

Finals
19–26 June
Partizan Pivara MB	3
Hemofarm	1

=== Semifinals ===
Team 1	Series	Team 2	Game 1	Game 2	Game 3
Partizan Pivara MB	2–0	Crvena zvezda	104–68	91–86	—
Hemofarm	2–0	Reflex	85–82	78–74	—

=== Finals ===
Team 1	Series	Team 2	Game 1	Game 2	Game 3	Game 4	Game 5
Partizan Pivara MB	3–1	Hemofarm	88–74	104–89	85–87	91–84	—

== See also ==
- 2004–05 Radivoj Korać Cup
