= Uroš Duvnjak =

Serbian basketball player

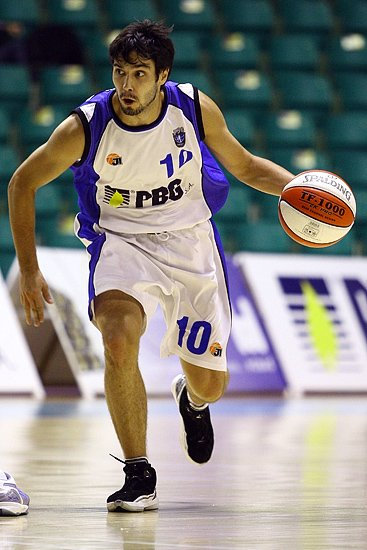
- Duvnjak playing with PBG Basket Poznań in 2009.

Personal information
- Born: November 19, 1986 (age 39) Belgrade, SR Serbia, SFR Yugoslavia
- Listed height: 6 ft 3 in (1.91 m)
- Listed weight: 214 lb (97 kg)

Career information
- NBA draft: 2008: undrafted
- Playing career: 2004–present
- Position: Point guard / shooting guard

Career history
- 2004–2005: Partizan
- 2005–2006: Sloga Kraljevo
- 2006: Atlas
- 2006–2007: Vojvodina Srbijagas
- 2007–2008: FMP
- 2008–2009: Radnički KG 06
- 2009–2010: PBG Basket Poznań
- 2011: Phantoms Braunschweig
- 2011–2012: Mega Vizura
- 2012: PAOK
- 2012–2013: Rethymno
- 2013–2014: Panionios
- 2014–2015: Nea Kifissia
- 2015–2016: PAOK
- 2016: Karpoš Sokoli
- 2016–2017: Apollon Patras
- 2017: MAFC
- 2017–2018: Soproni KC
- 2018–2019: Radnički 1950
- 2019: Mladost Zemun
- 2019–2020: Al Sadd
- 2020–2021: Napredak Aleksinac
- 2021–2022: Kolubara

Career highlights
- Serbian League champion (2005)

Uroš Duvnjak (born November 19, 1986) is a former Serbian professional basketball player. He is a 1.90 m tall combo guard.

== Professional career ==
In his pro career, Duvnjak has played with the following clubs: Partizan, Sloga Kraljevo, Atlas Belgrade, Vojvodina Srbijagas, FMP Železnik, Radnički KG 06, PBG Poznań Basket, New Yorker Phantoms Braunschweig, Mega Vizura, PAOK Thessaloniki, Rethymno, Panionios, and AENK.

In 2015, Duvnjak signed with PAOK. On 14 November 2016, Duvnjak signed for Apollon Patras.

On 12 November 2020, he signed for Napredak Aleksinac.

== National team career ==
Duvnjak was a member of the junior national teams of Serbia. He played at the 2004 FIBA Europe Under-18 Championship, and at the 2007 World University Games.
