= Miloš Vujanić =

Serbian basketball player and coach

Personal information
- Born: November 13, 1980 (age 46) Loznica, SR Serbia, SFR Yugoslavia
- Listed height: 1.90 m (6 ft 3 in)
- Listed weight: 85 kg (187 lb)

Career information
- NBA draft: 2002: 2nd round, 36th overall pick
- Drafted by: New York Knicks
- Playing career: 1999–2012
- Position: Point guard / shooting guard
- Coaching career: 2012–2013

Career history

Playing
- 1999–2001: Crvena zvezda
- 2001–2003: Partizan
- 2003–2005: Fortitudo Bologna
- 2005–2006: Barcelona
- 2006–2007: Panathinaikos
- 2007–2008: Dynamo Moscow
- 2008–2009: Efes Pilsen
- 2009–2010: Murcia
- 2010–2011: Panionios

Coaching
- 2012–2013: Partizan (assistant)

Career highlights
- As player: EuroLeague champion (2007); 2× All-EuroLeague Second Team (2003, 2004); EuroLeague Top Scorer (2003); 2× YUBA League champion (2002, 2003); YUBA League Top Scorer (2003); LBA champion (2005); Greek League champion (2007); Turkish League champion (2009); FR Yugoslavia Cup winner (2002); Greek Cup winner (2007); Turkish Cup winner (2009)
- Stats at Basketball Reference
Medals
Men's basketball
Representing (Federal Republic of Yugoslavia) FR Yugoslavia
FIBA World Cup
Gold medal – first place	2002 Indianapolis
Universiade
Silver medal – second place	1999 Palma de Mallorca
Gold medal – first place	2001 Beijing

Miloš Vujanić (Serbian Cyrillic: Милош Вујанић; born November 13, 1980) is a Serbian professional basketball coach and former player. A two-time All-EuroLeague selection, he won the EuroLeague championship with Panathinaikos, in 2007.

== Professional career ==
Vujanić started his professional career with Crvena zvezda (Red Star Belgrade), in 1999. After two seasons at the club, he signed with Partizan Belgrade, in the summer of 2001. In the 2002 NBA draft, Vujanić was selected with the 36th overall pick, by the New York Knicks, but later, his draft rights were traded to the Phoenix Suns. However, he decided to stay with Partizan for one more season, and he was the top scorer of the EuroLeague's 2002–03 season, averaging 25.8 points per game. In the summer of 2003, he moved to the Italian League, and signed a three-year deal with Skipper Bologna.

Vujanić ended up never playing in an NBA game and he is 1 of 9 players from the 2002 NBA Draft to never play a game in the league.

== National team career ==
With the senior FR Yugoslav national team, Vujanić won the gold medal at the 2002 FIBA World Championship, in Indianapolis. He was also a member of the senior Serbia and Montenegro national team (renamed from FR Yugoslavia national team) at the 2003 EuroBasket, and at the 2004 Summer Olympics.

== Career statistics ==
Legend
GP	Games played	GS	Games started	MPG	Minutes per game
FG%	Field-goal percentage	3P%	3-point field-goal percentage	FT%	Free-throw percentage
RPG	Rebounds per game	APG	Assists per game	SPG	Steals per game
BPG	Blocks per game	PPG	Points per game	PIR	Performance index rating
**Bold**	Career high

†	Denotes seasons in which Vujanić won the EuroLeague
	Led the league

Year	Team	GP	GS	MPG	FG%	3P%	FT%	RPG	APG	SPG	BPG	PPG	PIR
2001–02	Partizan	12	7	27.9	.455	.386	.750	**3.0**	2.8	.8	**.1**	13.5	10.5
2002–03	Partizan	14	12	**34.3**	.418	.408	.844	1.9	**3.2**	1.1	.0	**25.8**	**24.0**
2003–04	Fortitudo	20	16	29.2	.456	.385	.835	1.7	1.8	1.3	.0	16.3	13.6
2004–05	Fortitudo	**20**	**20**	29.3	.449	.338	.781	2.9	2.5	**1.4**	**.1**	16.6	16.1
2005–06	Barcelona	4	1	11.6	.400	.000	**1.000**	.3	1.0	.5	.0	2.5	1.0
2006–07†	Panathinaikos	19	0	14.4	.347	.345	.771	.4	.7	.5	.0	5.6	2.5
2007–08	Panathinaikos	2	0	6.9	**.666**	**1.000**	.500	.0	.0	.0	.0	3.0	1.5
2008–09	Efes Pilsen	10	7	25.4	.507	.361	.800	1.8	1.7	1.0	**.1**	10.9	9.5
Career		101	63	25.5	.441	.370	.810	1.8	2.0	1.0	.0	14.0	11.9

== See also ==
- List of NBA drafted players from Serbia
- New York Knicks draft history
