= Ljubisav Luković =

Serbian basketball player and coach

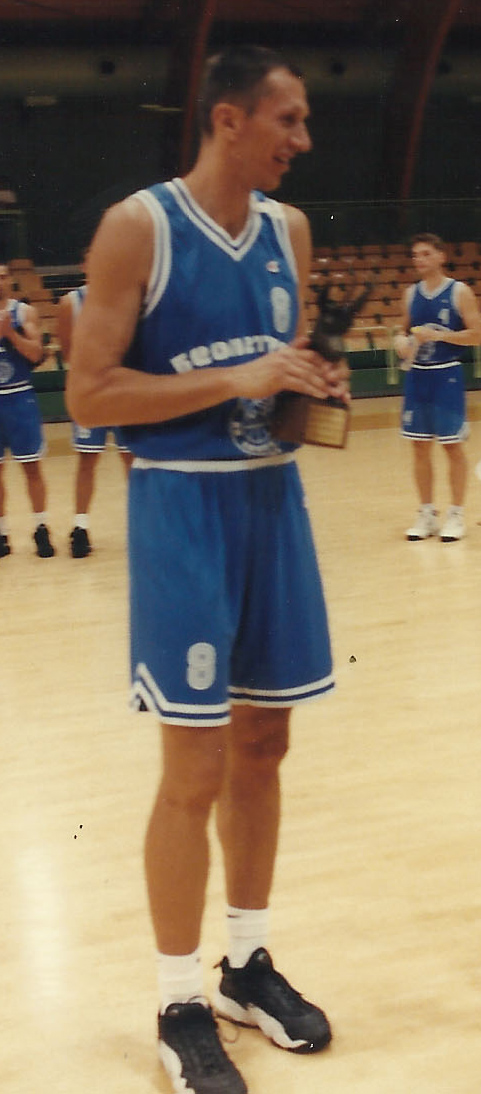
- Luković playing for Beopetrol

Personal information
- Born: 28 August 1962 (age 64) Sjenica, PR Serbia, FPR Yugoslavia
- Listed height: 2.03 m (6 ft 8 in)

Career information
- NBA draft: 1984: undrafted
- Playing career: 1980–1999
- Position: Power forward
- Number: 7, 8
- Coaching career: 2003–present

Career history

Playing
- 1986–1991: IMT
- 1992–1995: Borovica
- 1995–1999: Beopetrol

Coaching
- 2003–2007: Atlas
- 2007–2012: Partizan (assistant)
- 2012–2013, 2015–2016: Kumanovo

Career highlights
- As player: Yugoslav Cup winner (1987)

Ljubisav Luković (Serbian Cyrillic: Љубисав Луковић; born 28 August 1962) is a Serbian professional basketball coach and former player.

== Playing career ==
Luković played for IMT / Beopetrol and Borovica. During the 1991–92 season, he played in the UAE League.

== Post-playing career ==
He was an assistant coach of KK Partizan, also he used to work as an international scout for the Phoenix Suns and has worked as an expert commentator in the Radio Belgrade.

== Personal life ==
He is father of Uroš (born 1989), Marko (born 1992), and Branka (born 1995), all professional basketball players. Uroš played for FMP, Kumanovo, MZT Skopje, Partizan, Mornar, and Zadar among others. Marko played for Mega Vizura, MZT Skopje, Krka, UCAM Murcia, Manresa, Split, Breogán among others. Uroš and Marko were teammates during the 2015–16 season playing for MZT Skopje. Branka played for Voždovac, Partizan, and Valencia Basket among others.
