= 2006–07 Radivoj Korać Cup =

2007 Radivoj Korać Cup
- Season: 2006–07
- Duration: 8–11 February 2007
- Games played: 7
- Teams: 8

Regular season
- Season MVP: (Serbia) Dragan Labović

Finals
- Champions: FMP
- Runners-up: Partizan

The 2007 Radivoj Korać Cup is the 5th season of the Serbian men's national basketball cup tournament. It was the first cup tournament of Serbia. The Žućko's Left Trophy was awarded to the winner FMP from Belgrade.

== Venue ==
Kragujevac	2006–07 Radivoj Korać Cup (Serbia)
Jezero Hall	2006–07 Radivoj Korać Cup (Serbia)
Capacity: 5,320	2006–07 Radivoj Korać Cup (Serbia)

== Qualified teams ==
ABA NLB League	Basketball League of Serbia	Cup of Serbia (2nd-tier)
Crvena zvezda FMP; Hemofarm; Partizan	Vojvodina Srbijagas (1st)^{1} Novi Sad (2nd)^{1}	Radnički 034 Group (winner); Mega Ishrana (runners-up)

^{1} League table position after 11 rounds played

== Bracket ==
Quarterfinals
8 February
Partizan	108
Radnički 034 Group	75
8 February
Hemofarm	97
Mega Ishrana	79
9 February
FMP	95
Novi Sad	67
9 February
Crvena zvezda	86
Vojvodina Srbijagas	63

Semifinals
10 February
Partizan (OT)	94
Hemofarm	89
10 February
FMP	93
Crvena zvezda	79

Final
11 February
Partizan	61
FMP	79

Source: Serbian Government

== Quarterfinals ==
8 February 2007
18:00

Report

Partizan	108–75	Radnički 034 Group
Scoring by quarter: 30–21, 25–20, 26–16, 27–18
Pts: Peković 15		Pts: Glišović 20

Jezero Hall, Kragujevac
Attendance: 4,000
Referees: Jovčić, Juras, Obrknežević

8 February 2007
20:30

Report

Hemofarm	97–79	Mega Ishrana
Scoring by quarter: 30–17, 18–20, 15–24, 34–18
Pts: Borisov 21		Pts: Božović 19

Jezero Hall, Kragujevac
Attendance: 1,000
Referees: Nešković, Mrdak, Sedlar

9 February 2007
18:00

Report

FMP	95–67	Novi Sad
Scoring by quarter: 20–14, 23–19, 28–20, 24–14
Pts: Krstović 18		Pts: Bocka 16

Jezero Hall, Kragujevac
Attendance: 2,000
Referees: Belošević, Mazić, Čukalović

9 February 2007
20:30

Report

Crvena zvezda	86–63	Vojvodina Srbijagas
Scoring by quarter: 18–17, 33–16, 18–15, 17–15
Pts: Gurović 26		Pts: Golubović 14

Jezero Hall, Kragujevac
Attendance: 4,000
Referees: Vojinović, Maričić, Ličina

== Semifinals ==
10 February 2007
18:00

Report

FMP	93–79	Crvena zvezda
Scoring by quarter: 19–22, 28–17, 24–17, 22–23
Pts: Rašić 19		Pts: Antić 17

Jezero Hall, Kragujevac

10 February 2007
20:30

Report

Partizan	94–89 (OT)	Hemofarm
Scoring by quarter: 18:18, 18:14, 20:19, 20:25, Overtime: 18–13
Pts: Perović 17		Pts: Nešović 22

Jezero Hall, Kragujevac
Attendance: 4,000
Referees: Belošević, Nešković, Mrdak

== Final ==
11 February 2007
19:00

Report

Partizan	61–79	FMP
Scoring by quarter: 16–13, 15–15, 17–13, 12–32
Pts: Tripković 12		Pts: Rašić, Erceg 15

Jezero Hall, Kragujevac

== See also ==
- 2006–07 Basketball League of Serbia
- Milan Ciga Vasojević Cup
