= 2003–04 ULEB Cup Semi finals =

The 2003–04 ULEB Cup Semi finals basketball statistics are here. The 2003–04 ULEB Cup was the second season of Europe's secondary level professional club basketball tournament, the ULEB Cup, which is organised by Euroleague Basketball.

== Semifinal 1 ==
	Home team	Score	Away team	Venue	Date
Game 1	BC Reflex (Serbia and Montenegro)	70 - 69	(Israel) Hapoel Jerusalem	Belgrade	March 23, 2004
Game 2	Hapoel Jerusalem (Israel)	79 - 76	(Serbia and Montenegro) BC Reflex	Jerusalem	March 30, 2004

== Semifinal 2 ==
	Home team	Score	Away team	Venue	Date
Game 1	Adecco Estudiantes (Spain)	75 - 83	(Spain) Real Madrid	Madrid	March 23, 2004
Game 2	Real Madrid (Spain)	82 - 73	(Spain) Adecco Estudiantes	Madrid	March 30, 2004

== See also ==
- 2002–03 in Spanish basketball
