= 2002–03 YUBA League =

11th edition of YUBA League

2002–03 Frikom YUBA League^{1}
- League: YUBA League
- Season: 2002–03
- Dates: 5 October 2002 – 19 April 2003 (Regular season); 7 May – 5 June 2003 (Playoffs)
- Games played: 22 each
- Teams: 12

Regular season
- Top seed: Partizan Mobtel, 20–2

Finals
- Champions: Partizan Mobtel
- Runners-up: FMP Železnik
- Semifinalists: Crvena zvezda Budućnost

Statistical leaders
| Points | (Federal Republic of Yugoslavia) Miloš Vujanić | 23.1 |
| Rebounds | (Federal Republic of Yugoslavia) Dejan Milojević | 10.6 |
| Assists | (United States) Scoonie Penn | 4.3 |

Seasons
- ← 2001–02 2003–04 →
- ^{1} Sponsored league name, referring to Frikom.

The 2002–03 YUBA League (also known as 2002–03 Frikom YUBA League for sponsorship reasons) was the 11th season of the YUBA League, the top-tier professional basketball league in FR Yugoslavia.

== Regular season ==
=== Standings ===
| Pos | Team | Pld | W | L | PF | PA | PD | Pts | Qualification or relegation |
|---|---|---|---|---|---|---|---|---|---|
| 1 | Partizan Mobtel | 22 | 20 | 2 | 2008 | 1716 | +292 | 42 | Qualification to Playoffs |
| 2 | FMP Železnik | 22 | 18 | 4 | 1906 | 1644 | +262 | 40 | Qualification to Playoffs |
| 3 | Crvena zvezda | 22 | 16 | 6 | 1963 | 1763 | +200 | 38 | Qualification to Playoffs |
| 4 | Budućnost | 22 | 16 | 6 | 2019 | 1854 | +165 | 38 | Qualification to Playoffs |
| 5 | Hemofarm | 22 | 14 | 8 | 1790 | 1683 | +107 | 36 | Qualification to Playoffs |
| 6 | Lovćen | 22 | 9 | 13 | 1674 | 1792 | −118 | 31 | Qualification to Playoffs |
| 7 | Zdravlje | 22 | 8 | 14 | 1677 | 1822 | −145 | 30 | Qualification to Playoffs |
| 8 | NIS Vojvodina | 22 | 7 | 15 | 1825 | 1993 | −168 | 29 | Qualification to Playoffs |
| 9 | Lavovi 063 | 22 | 7 | 15 | 1796 | 1916 | −120 | 29 | |
| 10 | Spartak | 22 | 6 | 16 | 1635 | 1826 | −191 | 28 | |
| 11 | Sloga | 22 | 6 | 16 | 1636 | 1806 | −170 | 28 | |
| 12 | OKK Beograd | 22 | 5 | 17 | 1818 | 1932 | −114 | 27 | |

Source: kosarka.co.yu, srbijasport.net

== Playoffs ==
=== Bracket ===
Quarterfinals
8–11 May
Partizan Mobtel | 2
NIS Vojvodina | 0
8–13 May
Budućnost | 2
Hemofarm | 1
7–9 May
FMP Železnik | 2
Zdravlje | 0
7–9 May
Crvena zvezda | 2
Lovćen | 0

Semifinals
16–23 May
Partizan Mobtel | 3
Budućnost | 1
14–19 May
FMP Železnik | 3
Crvena zvezda | 0

Finals
31 May – 5 June
Partizan Mobtel | 3
FMP Železnik | 0

=== Quarterfinals ===
| Team 1 | Series | Team 2 | Game 1 | Game 2 | Game 3 |
|---|---|---|---|---|---|
| Partizan Mobtel | 2–0 | NIS Vojvodina | 96–72 | 99–74 | — |
| Budućnost | 2–1 | Hemofarm | 81–75 | 85–96 | 94–83 |
| FMP Železnik | 2–0 | Zdravlje | 78–67 | 87–68 | — |
| Crvena zvezda | 2–0 | Lovćen | 88–70 | 69–61 | — |

=== Semifinals ===
| Team 1 | Series | Team 2 | Game 1 | Game 2 | Game 3 | Game 4 | Game 5 |
|---|---|---|---|---|---|---|---|
| Partizan Mobtel | 3–1 | Budućnost | 93–91 | 101–85 | 104–107 | 92–77 | — |
| FMP Železnik | 3–0 | Crvena zvezda | 89–81 | 76–67 | 82–68 | — | — |

=== Finals ===
| Team 1 | Series | Team 2 | Game 1 | Game 2 | Game 3 | Game 4 | Game 5 |
|---|---|---|---|---|---|---|---|
| Partizan Mobtel | 3–0 | FMP Železnik | 82–71 | 90–85 | 76–69 | — | — |

== See also ==
- 2002–03 Radivoj Korać Cup
