= Saša Stanković =

Serbian basketball player

Personal information
- Born: April 5, 1972 (age 54) Leskovac, SR Serbia, SFR Yugoslavia
- Listed height: 2.04 m (6 ft 8 in)

Career information
- NBA draft: 1994: undrafted
- Playing career: 1988–2016
- Position: Small forward

Career history
- 1987–1993: Zdravlje
- 1993–1994: MZT Skopje
- 1997–2012: Zdravlje
- 2014–2015: Radnik Surdulica
- 2015–2016: Zdravlje

Saša Stanković (born April 5, 1972) is a former Serbian professional basketball player.
