= Marko Luković =

Serbian basketball player

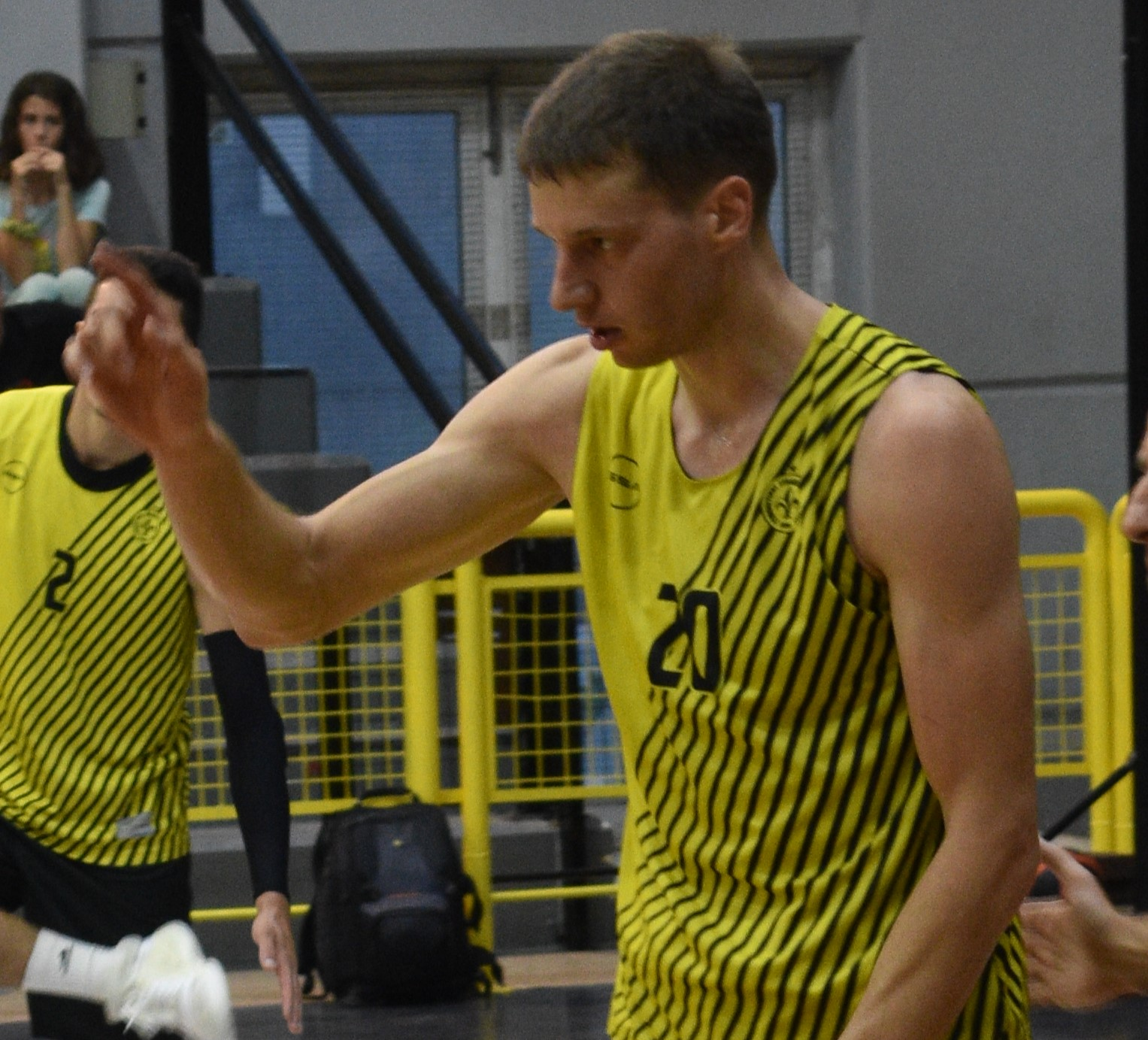
- Luković in 2023

Personal information
- Born: May 26, 1992 (age 34) Belgrade, Serbia, FR Yugoslavia
- Listed height: 6 ft 10 in (2.08 m)
- Listed weight: 203 lb (92 kg)

Career information
- NBA draft: 2014: undrafted
- Playing career: 2009–present
- Position: Power forward

Career history
- 2009–2014: Mega Vizura
- 2014–2015: TBB Trier
- 2015–2016: MZT Skopje
- 2016–2017: Krka
- 2017–2018: UCAM Murcia
- 2018: ESSM Le Portel
- 2018–2019: Manresa
- 2019: Igokea
- 2019–2020: Koper Primorska
- 2020–2021: Split
- 2021–2023: Breogán
- 2023: Maroussi
- 2023–2024: KTE-Duna Aszfalt
- 2024–2025: Hestia Menorca
- 2025: Mega Basket

Career highlights
- Macedonian League champion (2016); Macedonian Cup winner (2016); Bosnian Cup winner (2019); Slovenian Cup winner (2020); Macedonian Cup MVP (2016)

Marko Luković (born May 26, 1992) is a Serbian professional basketball player who plays for Hestia Menorca of the Leb ORO. He is a 2.07 m tall power forward.

== Professional career ==
Luković played in youth categories with Mega Vizura. He made his debut with the first team in March 2009. In July 2014, he left Mega and signed with German club TBB Trier for the 2014–15 season.

On August 17, 2015, he signed with MZT Skopje for the 2015–16 season. With MZT he won the Macedonian League championship and Macedonian Cup trophy. He was also named the Macedonian Cup MVP.

On July 6, 2016, he signed with Krka for the 2016–17 season. On July 22, 2017, he signed with UCAM Murcia for the 2017–18 season. On March 8, 2018, he parted ways with Murcia. Five days later, he signed with ESSM Le Portel.

On August 17, 2018, he signed with Baxi Manresa for the 2018–19 season. On January 10, 2019, he signed with Igokea for the rest of the 2018–19 season.

On December 28, 2019, he signed with Koper Primorska for the rest of the 2019–20 season. He averaged 14 points and 6.6 rebounds per game in ABA league, including two wild game winning buzzerbeaters. On 13 July 2020 he extended his contract with Koper Primorska.

On September 23, 2020, Luković signed for the Croatian team Split for the 2020–21 season.

== National team career ==
Luković was a member of the Serbian junior national teams. With Serbia U-18 team he played at the 2010 FIBA Europe Under-18 Championship in Lithuania. Two years later he played at the 2012 FIBA Europe Under-20 Championship in Slovenia.

== Personal life ==
Marko comes from a basketball family, with his father, Ljubisav Luković, being a former basketball player and current basketball coach, and his mother is also former basketball player. Marko has an older brother Uroš and younger sister Branka who are also professional basketball players.

== Career statistics ==
Legend
GP	Games played	GS	Games started	MPG	Minutes per game
FG%	Field-goal percentage	3P%	3-point field-goal percentage	FT%	Free-throw percentage
RPG	Rebounds per game	APG	Assists per game	SPG	Steals per game
BPG	Blocks per game	PPG	Points per game	PIR	Performance index rating
**Bold**	Career high

=== Domestic leagues ===
Season	Team	League	GP	MPG	FG%	3P%	FT%	RPG	APG	SPG	BPG	PPG
2008-09	Mega Vizura	ABA League	1	5.0	.250	.500	N/A	1.0	1.0	0	0	3.0
2009-10	Mega Vizura	ABA League	7	6.8	.222	.000	.000	1.1	0.6	0.1	0.1	0.6
2013–14 Mega Vizura	Mega Vizura	ABA League	25	16.6	.368	.400	.657	2.5	0.4	0.6	0.3	4.7
2015–16	MZT Skopje	ABA League	25	28.9	.430	.288	.681	5.8	2.2	0.8	0.7	11.8
2019–20	Koper Primorska	ABA League (7 games) Slovenian Basketball League (6 games)	13	27.1	.375	.222	.692	5.8	1.8	0.5	0.3	11.5
