= Goran Nikolić =

Montenegrin basketball player

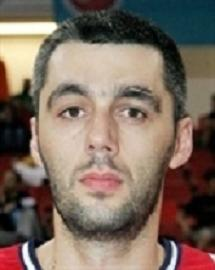

Personal information
- Born: July 1, 1976 (age 50) Nikšić, SR Montenegro, SFR Yugoslavia
- Listed height: 6 ft 9.5 in (2.07 m)
- Listed weight: 245 lb (111 kg)

Career information
- NBA draft: 1998: undrafted
- Playing career: 1996–2010
- Position: Power forward / center
- Number: 12

Career history
- 1996–1997: Ibon Nikšić
- 1997–2003: FMP Železnik
- 2003–2005: Efes Pilsen
- 2005–2006: Kyiv
- 2006–2007: Estudiantes
- 2007–2008: ALBA Berlin
- 2008–2009: Panionios
- 2009: AEL Limassol
- 2009–2010: Mersin BB

Goran Nikolić (Serbian Cyrillic: Горан Николић; born on July 1, 1976) is a Montenegrin former professional basketball player. He is 2.07 m (6 ft 9 ½ in) in height and 111 kg (245 lbs) in weight.

Born in Nikšić, Montenegro, then Yugoslavia, he is a power forward-center. Nikolić has been a member of the Serbia-Montenegro national basketball team and he played at the 2006 FIBA World Championship.
