= 2003–04 ABA Goodyear League =

2003–04 ABA Goodyear League season
- League: ABA Goodyear League
- Sport: Basketball
- Teams: Croatia (4 teams); Serbia and Montenegro (4 teams); Slovenia (4 teams); Bosnia and Herzegovina (2 teams)

Regular season
- Season champions: (Croatia) Cibona VIP
- Season MVP: (Serbia and Montenegro) Dejan Milojević (Budućnost)
- Top scorer: (Serbia and Montenegro) Igor Rakočević (Crvena zvezda) (23.22 ppg)

Final 4
- Champions: (Serbia and Montenegro) Reflex

ABA Goodyear League seasons
- ← 2002–03 2004–05 →

The 2003–04 ABA Goodyear League was the third season of the Liga ABA. The league expanded this season: 14 teams from Bosnia and Herzegovina, Croatia, Serbia and Montenegro, and Slovenia participated in Goodyear League in its third season: Union Olimpija, Krka, Pivovarna Laško, Geoplin Slovan, Cibona VIP, Zadar, Zagreb, Split Croatia Osiguranje, Široki Hercegtisak, Banjalučka pivara, Crvena zvezda, Reflex, Budućnost, Lovćen CG komercijalna banka.

There were 26 rounds played in the regular part of the season, best four teams qualified for the Final Four Tournament which was played in Zagreb from April 16 until April 18, 2004.

Reflex became the 2004 Goodyear League Champion.

== Regular season ==
Pos	Team	Pld	W	L	PF	PA	PD	Pts	Qualification or relegation
1	Cibona VIP	26	20	6	2242	1984	+258	46	Qualified for Final four
2	Reflex	26	19	7	2187	1945	+242	45	Qualified for Final four
3	Union Olimpija	26	18	8	2173	2050	+123	44	Qualified for Final four
4	Crvena zvezda	26	18	8	2250	2168	+82	44	Qualified for Final four
5	Budućnost	26	16	10	2307	2235	+72	42	
6	Pivovarna Laško	26	15	11	2084	2010	+74	41	
7	Krka	26	14	12	2116	2091	+25	40	Relegated
8	Zadar	26	13	13	2277	2217	+60	39	
9	Split CO	26	10	16	2118	2226	−108	36	
10	Geoplin Slovan	26	9	17	1923	2083	−160	35	
11	Zagreb	26	9	17	2023	2134	−111	35	
12	Široki Hercegtisak	26	8	18	2004	2128	−124	34	
13	Banjalučka pivara	26	8	18	2065	2229	−164	34	Relegated
14	Lovćen CG komercijalna banka	26	5	21	2000	2269	−269	31	Relegated

== Final four ==
Matches played at Dražen Petrović Basketball Hall, Zagreb

=== Incident ===
On Friday night, 16 April 2004 around 11pm following the semifinal games, an ethnically motivated incident occurred when Crvena zvezda's director Igor Žeželj and B92 journalist Danijel Bukumirović got assaulted at the Panorama Hotel parking lot by an organized group of fifteen Croatian hooligans armed with chains, rocks and metal poles. Bukumirović managed to escape into the car with only minor injuries while Žeželj wasn't as lucky and ended up with a fractured rib and 6 stitches on his forehead. Croatian police reportedly arrested six individuals in connection with the attack that was carried out by a group that trolled around the Final Four venue Dražen Petrović Basketball Hall, as well as hotels Sheraton and Panorama looking to beat up anyone from Serbia.

Semifinals; April 16
1	Cibona VIP	97
3	Union Olimpija	81
2	Reflex (OT)	113
4	Crvena zvezda	110

Final; April 18.
1	Cibona VIP	70
2	Reflex	71

2003–04 ABA Godyear League Champions
Reflex
1st title

== Stats leaders ==
=== Ranking MVP ===
Rank	Name	Team	Efficiency	Games	Average
1.	(Serbia and Montenegro) Dejan Milojević	(Serbia and Montenegro) Budućnost	739	25	29.56
2.	(Serbia and Montenegro) Igor Rakočević	(Serbia and Montenegro) Crvena zvezda	610	23	26.52
3.	(Croatia) Frano Čolak	(Bosnia and Herzegovina) Široki Hercegtisak	506	26	19.46
4.	(Serbia and Montenegro) Ognjen Aškrabić	(Serbia and Montenegro) Reflex	463	24	19.29
5.	(Croatia) Davor Marcelić	(Croatia) Zadar	475	26	18.27

=== Points ===
Rank	Name	Team	Points	Games	PPG
1.	(Serbia and Montenegro) Igor Rakočević	(Serbia and Montenegro) Crvena zvezda	534	23	23.22
2.	(Serbia and Montenegro) Dejan Milojević	(Serbia and Montenegro) Budućnost	513	25	20.52
3.	(Croatia) Davor Marcelić	(Croatia) Zadar	440	26	16.92
4.	(Bosnia and Herzegovina) Feliks Kojadinović	(Bosnia and Herzegovina) Banjalučka pivovara	402	24	16.75
5.	(Croatia) Frano Čolak	(Bosnia and Herzegovina) Široki Hercegtisak	421	26	16.19

=== Rebounds ===
Rank	Name	Team	Rebounds	Games	RPG
1.	(Serbia and Montenegro) Dejan Milojević	(Serbia and Montenegro) Budućnost	270	25	10.80
2.	(Serbia and Montenegro) Ninoslav Marjanović	(Serbia and Montenegro) Budućnost	161	22	7.32
3.	(Croatia) Andrija Žižić	(Croatia) Cibona Vip	177	27	6.56
4.	(Serbia and Montenegro) Marko Rakočević	(Serbia and Montenegro) Lovćen CKB	147	24	6.13
4.	(United States) Tommy Smith	(Croatia) Split CO	147	24	6.13

=== Assists ===
Rank	Name	Team	Assists	Games	APG
1.	(United States) Curtis McCants	(Croatia) Split CO	73	16	4.56
1.	(Serbia and Montenegro) Igor Rakočević	(Serbia and Montenegro) Crvena zvezda	101	23	4.39
3.	(Croatia) Vladimir Krstić	(Croatia) Zadar	60	14	4.29
4.	(Croatia) Martin Vanjak	(Bosnia and Herzegovina) Široki Hercegtisak	109	26	4.19
5.	(Croatia) Ivan Tomas	(Croatia) Zagreb	99	26	3.96

Source: Adriatic League
