= FR Yugoslavia Basketball Cup =

Federal Republic of Yugoslavia Basketball Cup
- Sport: Basketball
- Founded: 1992; 34 years ago
- First season: 1992
- Folded: 2002; 24 years ago
- Country: (Federal Republic of Yugoslavia) FR Yugoslavia; 1992–2002
- Last champion: Partizan ICN (2001–02)
- Most titles: 6 titles Partizan
- Related competitions: YUBA League (1992–2002)

The Yugoslav Basketball Cup (Serbo-Croatian: Kup Jugoslavije u košarci / Куп Југославије у кошарци) was the men's national basketball cup of the Federal Republic of Yugoslavia between its inauguration in 1992 and 2002. It succeeded the Yugoslav Basketball Cup held 1959–1992 in the former Socialist Federal Republic of Yugoslavia before its breakup. In 2002, FR Yugoslavia changed its name to Serbia and Montenegro while the cup got renamed to the Radivoj Korać Cup.

== Title holders ==
- 1992–93 OKK Beograd
- 1993–94 Partizan
- 1994–95 Partizan
- 1995–96 Budućnost
- 1996–97 FMP
- 1997–98 Budućnost
- 1998–99 Partizan
- 1999–00 Partizan
- 2000–01 Budućnost
- 2001–02 Partizan ICN

== The finals ==
Season	Champions	Score	Runners-up	Venue	Location	Winning Coach
1992–93	OKK Beograd	104–91	Partizan	SPC Pinki	Sremska Mitrovica	(Serbia and Montenegro) Rajko Žižić
1993–94	Partizan	104–102	Crvena zvezda	SPC Vojvodina	Novi Sad	(Serbia and Montenegro) Željko Lukajić
1994–95	Partizan	84–81	Spartak Subotica	Hala Borca kraj Morave	Čačak	(Serbia and Montenegro) Borislav Džaković
1995–96	Budućnost	126–115	Partizan	Nikšić Sports Center	Nikšić	(Serbia and Montenegro) Živko Brajović
1996–97	FMP Železnik	105–92	Partizan	Čair Sports Center	Niš	(Serbia and Montenegro) Momir Milatović
1997–98	Budućnost	78–71	Beobanka	Nikšić Sports Center	Nikšić	(Serbia and Montenegro) Goran Bojanić
1998–99	Partizan	80–62	FMP	Pionir Hall	Belgrade	(Serbia and Montenegro) Vladislav Lučić
1999–00	Partizan	79–66	Zdravlje	SRC Dubočica	Leskovac	(Serbia and Montenegro) Nenad Trajković
2000–01	Budućnost	87–72	Partizan	Millennium Centar	Vršac	(Serbia and Montenegro) Bogdan Tanjević (2)
2001–02	Partizan ICN	88–81	Budućnost	Morača Sports Center	Podgorica	(Serbia and Montenegro) Duško Vujošević (2)

== Performance by club ==
Rank	Club	Titles	Runner-up	Winning years
1	Partizan	5	4	1993–94, 1994–95, 1998–99, 1999–00, 2000–02
2	Budućnost	3	1	1995–96, 1997–98, 2000–01
3	FMP	1	1	1996–97
4	OKK Beograd	1	0	1992–93
5	Crvena zvezda	0	1	
6	Spartak	0	1	
7	Beobanka	0	1	
8	Zdravlje	0	1	

== See also ==
- Yugoslav Basketball Super Cup
- Yugoslav First Basketball League
- Yugoslav 1. B Federal Basketball League
- YUBA League
- Radivoj Korać Cup
- Adriatic League
- Adriatic League Supercup
