= 2006–07 ABA NLB League =

2006–07 NLB League season
- League: Liga ABA
- Sport: Basketball
- Teams: Croatia (4 teams); Serbia (4 teams); Slovenia (3 teams); Bosnia and Herzegovina (2 teams); Montenegro (1 team)

Regular season
- Season champions: (Serbia) FMP Železnik
- Season MVP: (Serbia) Milan Gurović (Crvena zvezda)
- Top scorer: (Serbia) Milan Gurović (Crvena zvezda) (28.60 ppg)

Playoff
- Champions: (Serbia) Partizan
- Runners-up: FMP

NLB League seasons
- ← 2005–06 2007–08 →

The 6th season of Liga ABA saw them change their name to the ABA NLB League as their general sponsor changed. Goodyear Tire and Rubber Company ceded their sponsorship rights to the NLB group.

In other changes, after Montenegro declared independence in 2006, Budućnost returned to the regional league with a wild-card given by the NLB League board. And the Final Four tournament was replaced with a playoff.

14 teams from Bosnia and Herzegovina, Croatia, Montenegro, Serbia and Slovenia participated in the NLB League in its sixth season: Union Olimpija, Helios, Geoplin Slovan, Cibona, Zadar, Zagreb, Split, Široki ERONET, Bosna ASA BH TELECOM, Crvena zvezda, Partizan, Hemofarm, FMP Železnik, Budućnost.

There were 26 rounds played in the regular part of the season. The best four teams qualified for the play-off (best-of-three series).

Partizan became the 2007 NLB League Champion.

== Regular season ==
Pos	Team	Pld	W	L	PF	PA	PD	Pts	Qualification or relegation
1	FMP Železnik	26	21	5	2256	2099	+157	47	Qualified for Playoffs
2	Cibona	26	20	6	2222	2045	+177	46	Qualified for Playoffs
3	Partizan	26	20	6	2187	1939	+248	46	Qualified for Playoffs
4	Hemofarm	26	18	8	2132	1968	+164	44	Qualified for Playoffs
5	Budućnost	26	16	10	2086	2018	+68	42	
6	Crvena zvezda	26	15	11	2325	2212	+113	41	
7	Zadar	26	14	12	2204	2149	+55	40	
8	Helios	26	13	13	2073	2066	+7	39	
9	Union Olimpija	26	13	13	2114	2047	+67	39	
10	Bosna ASA BHT	26	10	16	2136	2251	−115	36	Relegated
11	Široki Prima pivo	26	9	17	2002	2178	−176	35	
12	Zagreb	26	8	18	2019	2105	−86	34	
13	Geoplin Slovan	26	3	23	1922	2237	−315	29	
14	Split CO	26	2	24	1928	2318	−390	28	

== Stats Leaders ==
=== Points ===
Rank	Name	Team	Points	Games	PPG
1.	(Serbia) Milan Gurović	Crvena zvezda	572	25	28,60
2.	(Canada) Carl English	Zadar	467	23	20,30
3.	(United States) Dwayne Broyles	Zagreb	366	23	15,91
4.	(Croatia) Robert Troha	Helios	405	26	15,58
5.	(Finland) Teemu Rannikko	Olimpija	358	23	15,57

=== Rebounds ===
Rank	Name	Team	Rebounds	Games	RPG
1.	(North Macedonia) Todor Gečevski	Zadar	246	26	9,46
2.	(Croatia) Stanko Barać	Široki	184	26	7,08
3.	(Serbia) Milenko Topić	Hemofarm	173	27	6,41
4.	(Slovenia) Mirza Begić	Slovan	138	23	6,00
5.	(Slovenia) Gašper Vidmar	Slovan	149	26	5,73

=== Assists ===
Rank	Name	Team	Assists	Games	APG
1.	(Serbia) Aleksandar Rašić	FMP Železnik	111	27	4,11
2.	(Slovenia) Jure Močnik	Helios	98	25	3,92
3.	(Finland) Teemu Rannikko	Olimpija	88	23	3,83
4.	(United States) Vonteego Cummings	Partizan	93	28	3,32
5.	(Serbia) Miljan Pavković	Budućnost	83	26	3,19

=== Ranking MVP ===
Rank	Name	Team	Efficiency	Games	Average
1.	(Serbia) Milan Gurović	Crvena zvezda	585	25	23,40
2.	(North Macedonia) Todor Gečevski	Zadar	579	26	22,27
3.	(Finland) Teemu Rannikko	Olimpija	410	23	17,83
4.	(United States) Dwayne Broyles	Zagreb	409	23	17,78
5.	(Serbia) Milenko Topić	Hemofarm	460	27	17,04

== Playoffs ==
Semifinals
1	FMP Železnik	2
4	Hemofarm	0
2	Cibona	1
3	Partizan	2

Final
1	FMP Železnik	0
3	Partizan	2

2006–07 ABA NLB League Champions
Partizan
1st title
