= Jugopetrol AD =

Jugopetrol A.D.
- Company type: Joint stock company
- Traded as: MNSE: JGPK
- Industry: Petroleum
- Founded: 1947
- Headquarters: Podgorica, Montenegro
- Number of locations: 46 Gas stations
- Key people: Antonios Semelides (CEO)
- Products: Oil, Gas, Petroleum products
- Revenue: EUR 115.4 million (2017)
- Net income: EUR7.20 million (2017)
- Total assets: EUR101.79 million (2017)
- Number of employees: 200 (2012)
- Website: www.jugopetrol.co.me

Jugopetrol AD Podgorica (MNSE: JGPK) is the largest petroleum company in Montenegro.

== History ==
The company was established in Kotor on 12 April 1947 at the early beginnings of oil operations in Yugoslavia. The company started its first oil exploration in 1970. The company has a total of 43 petrol stations in all major Montenegro cities Budva, Tivat, Kotor, Bar, Nikšić and Podgorica.

Since 2002 Jugopetrol Kotor is owned by Greek company Hellenic Petroleum. Ultimately, the buyer was Hellenic Petroleum, which in 2014 moved the company's headquarters from Kotor to Podgorica and changed its name from Jugopetrol A.D. Kotor on Jugopetrol A.D.

== See also ==
- Hellenic Petroleum
- List of companies of the Socialist Federal Republic of Yugoslavia
