= Ognjen Aškrabić =

Serbian basketball player

Personal information
- Born: 28 July 1979 (age 47) Sarajevo, SR Bosnia and Herzegovina, SFR Yugoslavia
- Listed height: 2.07 m (6 ft 9 in)
- Listed weight: 103 kg (227 lb)

Career information
- NBA draft: 2001: undrafted
- Playing career: 1997–2011
- Position: Power forward / center
- Number: 14

Career history
- 1997–1998: Beovuk 72
- 1998–2004: FMP
- 2004–2006: Dynamo Saint Petersburg
- 2006–2007: Lottomatica Roma
- 2007–2009: Triumph Lyubertsy
- 2009–2010: Donetsk

Career highlights
- FIBA Europe League champion (2005); Adriatic League champion (2004); Adriatic League Final Four MVP (2004); Serbian Cup winner (2003)
Medals
Representing FR Yugoslavia
Universiade
Gold medal – first place	2001 Beijing	Team
Silver medal – second place	1999 Palma de Mallorca	Team

Ognjen Aškrabić (Serbian Cyrillic: Огњен Ашкрабић; born 28 July 1979) is a Serbian former professional basketball player.

== Professional career ==
While playing for Dynamo Saint Petersburg, Aškrabić won the FIBA Europe League in 2005.

== National team career ==
Aškrabić represented Serbia and Montenegro at the EuroBasket 2003 as well as at the 2006 FIBA World Championship.
