= Mladen Šekularac =

Montenegrin basketball player (born 1981)

Personal information
- Born: January 29, 1981 (age 45) Bar, SR Montenegro, SFR Yugoslavia
- Listed height: 2.04 m (6 ft 8 in)
- Listed weight: 102 kg (225 lb)

Career information
- NBA draft: 2002: 2nd round, 55th overall pick
- Drafted by: Dallas Mavericks
- Playing career: 1996–2010, 2014–2015
- Position: Small forward
- Number: 7
- Coaching career: 2015–2016

Career history

Playing
- 1996–1997: Mornar Bar
- 1997–2002: FMP Železnik
- 2002–2003: Virtus Bologna
- 2003–2004: Budućnost Podgorica
- 2004–2005: Apollon Patras
- 2005–2008: Antwerp Giants
- 2008–2009: Spirou Charleroi
- 2009–2010: Jedinstvo Bijelo Polje
- 2010: Igokea
- 2014–2015: Zlatibor

Coaching
- 2015: Zlatibor
- 2015–2016: Sloboda Užice

Career highlights
- Belgian Cup winner (2007); 4× YUBA All-Star Game (1999–2002)
- Stats at Basketball Reference
Medals
Men's basketball
Representing (Federal Republic of Yugoslavia) FR Yugoslavia
Summer Universiade
Silver medal – second place	1999 Palma de Mallorca
European Championship for Cadets
Gold medal – first place	1997 Belgium	Under-16

Mladen Šekularac (Serbian Cyrillic: Младен Шекуларац; born January 29, 1981) is a Montenegrin basketball coach and former professional player.

== Playing career ==
At one point Šekularac was considered to be one of the biggest European talents and was projected as NBA draft lottery pick candidate. His reputation was such that his club at the time, KK FMP, put a €1.3 million price tag on his transfer. However, inconsistent form and unsteady overall progress made many uncertain about his potential.

He was an early entry candidate for the 2000 and 2001 NBA drafts before withdrawing each time. He stayed, however, in the 2002 NBA draft and ended up being taken in the second round with the 55th pick by the Dallas Mavericks. They traded his rights to the Golden State Warriors in 2004.

Šekularac never played a game in the NBA and is 1 of 9 players from the 2002 NBA Draft to never play a game in the league.

== See also ==
- List of NBA drafted players from Serbia
