= KK FMP (1991–2011) =

Defunct basketball club in Belgrade, Serbia

FMP Železnik
- Nickname: Panteri (Panthers)
- Founded: 1975; 51 years ago
- Dissolved: 2011; 15 years ago
- History: List: KK ILR Železnik 1975–1986 Dissolved: 1986–1991 KK FMP Železnik 1991–2003 KK Reflex 2003–2005 KK FMP 2005–2011 KK Crvena zvezda Beograd 2011–2015
- Arena: Železnik Hall
- Capacity: 3,000
- Location: Belgrade, Serbia
- Team colors: Red and White
- Championships: 2 ABA League; 4 National Cups
- Retired numbers: 7 (4, 4, 5, 10, 12, 14, 20)

Košarkaški klub FMP (Serbian Cyrillic: Кошаркашки клуб ФMП), commonly referred to as KK FMP, was a men's professional basketball club based in Belgrade, Serbia. The club played its home games at the 3,000 capacity Železnik Hall and have won the regional ABA League twice, in the 2003–04 and 2005–06 seasons.

In 2011, the club started cooperating with KK Crvena zvezda and competed under their name until 2015. In 2015, the club disbanded its senior team and changed the name to KK ILR Železnik. In 2013, Radnički FMP (formerly Radnički Novi Sad) adopted the name and the FMP logo, and renamed itself to KK FMP. However, not only according to the club's official website, but also according to the official website of the Adriatic League, this club still competes in the Adriatic League.

== History ==
=== 1975–1986: early years ===
The club was established under the name KK ILR Železnik in 1975 on the joint initiative of the Ivo Lola Ribar Machine Factory (named after Yugoslav communist politician and military leader Ivo Lola Ribar) and the Železnik local community administrative board. Initially, the club was part of the Ivo Lola Ribar Sports Society, which, in addition to basketball, also fielded teams in football, handball, volleyball, boxing, bowling, archery, and chess.

During its beginnings, the club competed in the Belgrade Municipal League (Belgrade Zone), playing its home games on the outdoor concrete court belonging to the Braća Jerković Elementary School. Since the local league was run in the spring-summer period, the club also entered the Belgrade Winter League in order to maintain the fitness level until the start of the next season. The new club was well-received by Železnik residents who often packed the small home court. Over time, as interest in basketball grew throughout the community, the club started developing a youth system by adding various age categories.

In the 1980s, the Železnik's senior squad starting posting notable results as the club progressed from the lower leagues. By the mid-1980s, they made it to Serbian Provincial League. However, with promotion to a higher level of competition, the operating costs also started rising. Unable to cover the costs of renting a basketball hall in which to compete, ILR Železnik effectively folded in 1986 as basketball activities ceased.

=== 1991–2011: years of success ===
The club was inactive until 1991 when it got reestablished under the name KK FMP Železnik on the initiative of the Fabrika metalnih proizvoda (Metal Products Factory), which became the club's owner. Almost immediately, the reestablished club continued where it had left-off in 1986. Following a season in the Second Serbian Provincial League, the club gained promotion to the First Provincial League. For the 1994–95 season, FMP Železnik made it to the YUBA B League, the 2nd-tier league in FR Yugoslavia. In this season, they won a top spot with only four losses, winning promotion to the YUBA League. On the club's 20th anniversary, in the 1995–96 season, FMP Železnik competed in the national top-tier league, finishing third the Group Three and gaining qualification into the second stage, the Championship League, where they finished ninth with a 19–17 record. In 1997, the club won its first major trophy, the Yugoslav Cup, after a 105–92 win over Partizan Inex in Niš. The club has never won a National League title, even they went into three finals (1996–97, 1997–98, 2002–03).

In the 2003–04 ABA season, the team, competing under the name KK Reflex, won the regional ABA League, defeating Croatian side Cibona in the final. Two years later, the club won another ABA title winning over Partizan in the Final.

FMP played in the final of the 2011 Radivoj Korać Cup against Partizan, where they lost 77–73.

=== 2011–2015: agreement with Crvena zvezda ===
In August 2011, the club has reached a five-year agreement with KK Crvena zvezda after which the club used the Crvena zvezda's name, emblem, and colors in that period. The agreement stipulates that all the club's results within the specified period (including trophies) will be attributed to the Crvena zvezda. After this period, the contract stipulated that Crvena zvezda will continue where the FMP has left off.

In July 2015, Crvena zvezda became financially consolidate, and the agreement between the clubs ended a year before it was originally planned. In the meantime, KK Radnički Basket (formerly Radnički Novi Sad) changed its name to Radnički FMP and subsequently to KK FMP in 2013 with headquarters at the same address where the "original" FMP was based. Radnički FMP used the same team colors and partially modified logo, while "the original" FMP has changed its name to KK ILR Železnik and started competing with a youth system only.

== Players ==
=== Retired numbers ===
KK FMP retired numbers
No	Nat.	Player	Position	Tenure	Ref.
4	(Serbia)	Miloš Teodosić	PG	2004–2007	
4	(Serbia)	Bojan Popović	PG	2001–2005	
5	(United States)	Reggie Freeman	SG	2002–2003, 2003–2005	
10	(Montenegro)	Goran Bošković	SG/SF	1996–1998	
12	(Montenegro)	Goran Nikolić	PF/C	1997–2003	
14	(Serbia)	Ognjen Aškrabić	PF/C	1998–2004	
20	(Serbia)	Duško Savanović	PF	2003–2004; 2005–2006	

=== Players in the NBA draft ===
^{#}	Denotes player who has never appeared in an NBA regular-season or playoff game

Position	Player	Year	Round	Pick	Drafted by
PF	(Federal Republic of Yugoslavia) Vladimir Radmanović	2001	1st round	12th	Seattle SuperSonics
SG	(Federal Republic of Yugoslavia) Mladen Šekularac^{#}	2002	2nd round	55th	Dallas Mavericks
C	(Federal Republic of Yugoslavia) Mile Ilić	2005	2nd round	43rd	New Jersey Nets

== Coaches ==
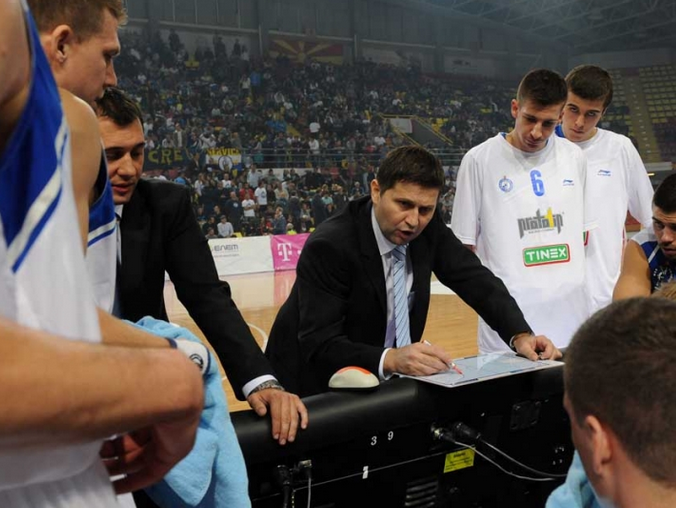
Vlada Vukoičić led the club to its biggest success, winning the Adriatic League in 2006.

- (Federal Republic of Yugoslavia) Momir Milatović (1996–1998)
- (Federal Republic of Yugoslavia) Boško Đokić (1998)
- (Federal Republic of Yugoslavia) Aleksandar Petrović (1998–2001)
- (Federal Republic of Yugoslavia) Miodrag Baletić (2001–2002)
- (Federal Republic of Yugoslavia) Vlade Đurović (2002–2004)
- (Serbia and Montenegro) Boško Đokić (2004–2005)
- (Serbia) Vlada Vukoičić (2005–2008)
- (Serbia) Slobodan Klipa (2008)
- (Serbia) Milovan Stepandić (2008–2009)
- (Serbia) Slobodan Klipa (2009)
- (Serbia) Vlade Đurović (2009–2010)
- (Serbia) Boško Đokić (2010–2011)
- (Serbia) Aleksandar Petrović (2011)

== Season-by-season ==
Season	Tier	Division	Pos.	Postseason	W–L	National Cup	Adriatic competitions			European competitions		
FMP Železnik
1994–95	2	YUBA B League	C	—	N/A	N/A				—		
1995–96	1	YUBA League	N/A	CL 9th	19–17	N/A				—		
1996–97	1	YUBA League	3	Runners up	N/A	Winners				—		
1997–98	1	YUBA League	5	Runners up	N/A	N/A				2 EuroCup	T32	7–5
1998–99	1	YUBA League	7	Not held	11–11	Runners up				3 Korać Cup	RS	3–3
1999–00	1	YUBA League	6	Quarterfinalist	12–12	N/A				3 Korać Cup	2R	Wd
2000–01	1	YUBA League	3	Quarterfinalist	15–10	Semifinalist				3 Korać Cup	T32	4–4
2001–02	1	YUBA League	3	Semifinalist	19–9	N/A	—			2 Saporta Cup	T16	8–4
2002–03	1	YUBA League	2	Runners up	22–7	Winners	—			2 ULEB Cup	QF	11–3
Reflex
2003–04	1	BLSM Super League	6	—	5–9	Runners up	ABA League	C	21–7	2 ULEB Cup	SF	13–3
2004–05	1	BLSM Super League	2	Semifinalist	10–6	Winners	ABA League	SF	21–11	2 ULEB Cup	RS	5–5
FMP
2005–06	1	BLSM Super League	A2	Semifinalist	11–4	Semifinalist	ABA League	C	21–8	2 ULEB Cup	T16	8–4
2006–07	1	BLS Super League	2	Semifinalist	12–4	Winners	ABA League	2nd	23–7	2 ULEB Cup	SF	12–4
2007–08	1	BLS Super League	2	Semifinalist	13–4	Semifinalist	ABA League	QF	16–13	2 ULEB Cup	RS	3–7
2008–09	1	BLS Super League	A2	Semifinalist	3–6	Semifinalist	ABA League	10	10–16	2 Eurocup	RS	4–6
2009–10	1	BLS Super League	5	—	6–8	Runners up	ABA League	12	10–16	3 EuroChallenge	QF	9–5
2010–11	1	BLS First League	1	Semifinalist	31–12	Runners up	—			—		

== Trophies and awards ==
=== Trophies ===
YUBA League

- Runners-up (3) – 1996–97, 1997–98, 2002–03

FR Yugoslavia Cup / Radivoj Korać Cup

- Winners (4) – 1996–97, 2002–03, 2004–05, 2006–07
- Runners-up (4) – 1998–99, 2003–04, 2009–10, 2010–11

ABA League

- Winners (2) – 2003–04, 2005–06
- Runners-up (1) – 2006–07

== Notable players ==
Note: Flags indicate national team eligibility at FIBA-sanctioned events. Players may hold other non-FIBA nationalities not displayed.

Criteria

To appear in this section a player must have either:

- Set a club record or won an individual award while at the club
- Played at least one official international match for their national team at any time
- Played at least one official NBA match at any time.

- (Serbia) Nemanja Aleksandrov
- (Serbia) Ognjen Aškrabić
- (Serbia) Branko Cvetković
- (Serbia) Zoran Erceg
- (Serbia) Mile Ilić
- (Serbia) Dragan Labović
- (Serbia) Branko Jorović
- (Serbia) Dušan Kecman
- (Serbia) Branko Lazić
- (Serbia) Milan Mačvan
- (Serbia) Marko Marinović
- (Serbia) Dejan Milojević
- (Serbia) Veselin Petrović
- (Serbia) Bojan Popović
- (Serbia) Vuk Radivojević
- (Serbia) Vladimir Radmanović
- (Serbia) Miroslav Raduljica
- (Serbia) Aleksandar Rašić
- (Serbia) Duško Savanović
- (Serbia) Aleksandar Smiljanić
- (Serbia) Miloš Teodosić
- (Bulgaria) Filip Videnov
- (Israel) Guy Pnini
- (Jamaica) Kimani Ffriend
- (North Macedonia) Predrag Samardžiski
- (Montenegro) Goran Bošković
- (Montenegro) Nikola Bulatović
- (Montenegro) Goran Nikolić
- (Montenegro) Luka Pavićević
- (Montenegro) Dejan Radonjić
- (Montenegro) Mladen Šekularac
- (Montenegro) Slavko Vraneš
- (United States) (Panama) Chris Warren
- (United States) (United States Virgin Islands) Reggie Freeman
- (United States) Brandon Bowman

== International record ==
Season	Achievement	Notes
EuroCup
2006–07	Semifinals	Eliminated by Lietuvos rytas, 139–147 (1–1)
2003–04	Semifinals	Eliminated by Hapoel Jerusalem, 146–148 (1–1)
2002–03	Quarterfinals	Eliminated by DKV Joventut, 143–148 (1–1)
2005–06	Top 16	Eliminated by Adecco ASVEL, 145–159 (1–1)
2008–09	Regular season	4th in Group G with Pamesa Valencia, Artland Dragons, and Fortitudo Bologna (1–5)
2007–08	Regular season	5th in Group B with Beşiktaş Cola Turka, Ventspils, Köln 99ers, Élan Chalon, and Ovarense Aerosoles (3–7)
2004–05	Regular season	4th in Group D with Dynamo Moscow, Lukoil Academic, Aris Egnatia Bank, Vertical Vision Cantù, and Türk Telekom (5–5)
FIBA Saporta Cup
2001–02	Round of 16	Eliminated by Telekom Baskets Bonn, 172–174 (1–1)
1997–98	Round of 32	Eliminated by ASVEL, 136–145 (1–1)
FIBA EuroChallenge
2009–10	Quarterfinals	Eliminated by Göttingen, 2–0
FIBA Korać Cup
2000–01	Round of 32	4th in Group C with Darüşşafaka, Levski Sofia, and Khimki (2–4)
1998–99	Regular season	3rd in Group D with Panionios Nutella, Keravnos Keo, and Fribourg Olympic (3–3)
1999–2000	Second round	Withdrew; Group O with Aris, Apollon Limassol, and Levski Sofia
