= Milenko Topić =

Serbian basketball player and coach

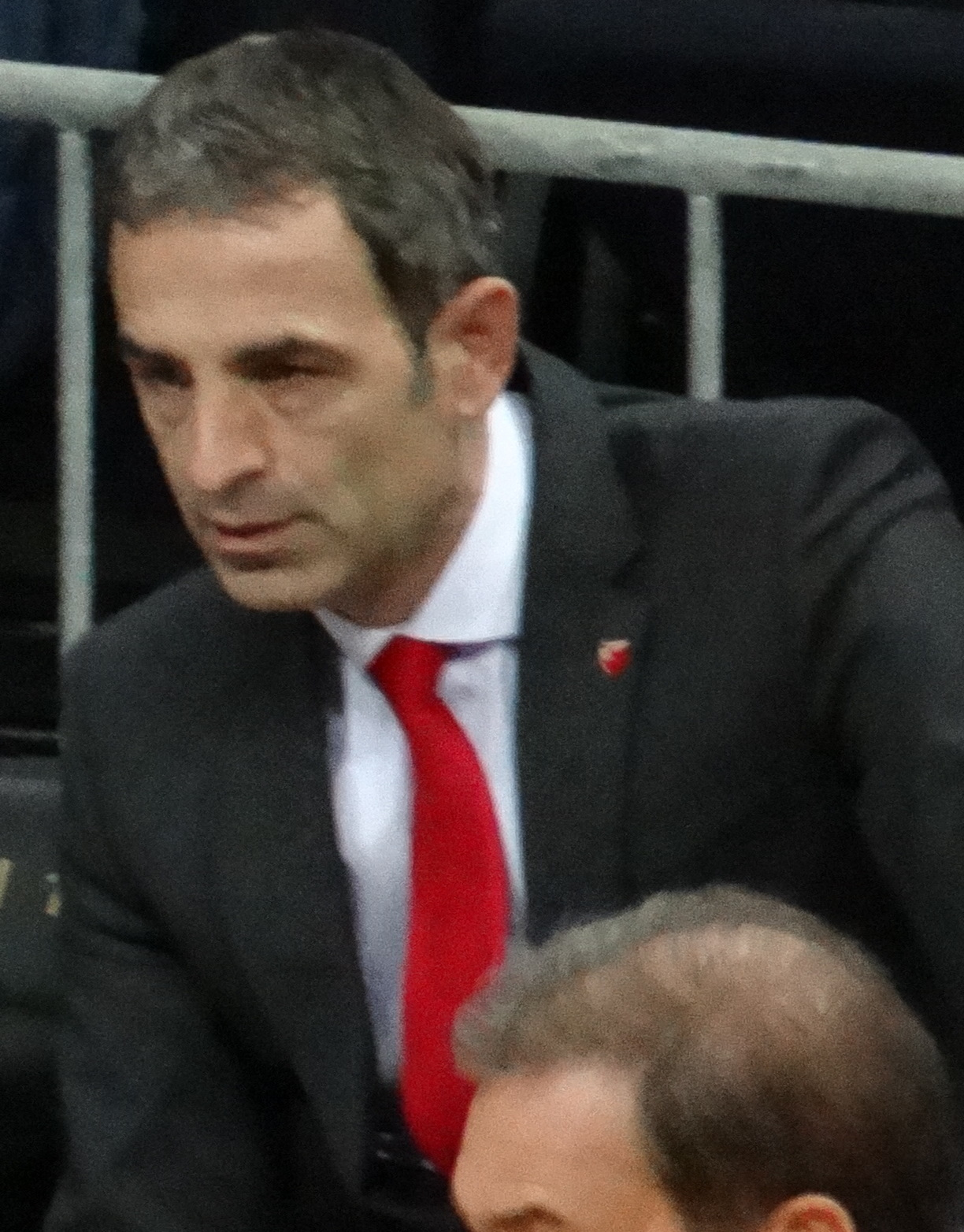
- Topić with Crvena zvezda in December 2017.

Personal information
- Born: 6 March 1969 (age 57) Pančevo, SR Serbia, SFR Yugoslavia
- Listed height: 2.04 m (6 ft 8 1/2 in)
- Listed weight: 99 kg (218 lb)

Career information
- NBA draft: 1991: undrafted
- Playing career: 1988–2008
- Position: Power forward
- Number: 14, 15
- Coaching career: 2015–present

Career history

Playing
- 1988–1991: Sloga Banatsko Novo Selo
- 1991–1995: Profikolor
- 1995–1997: BFC Beočin
- 1997–1999: Crvena zvezda
- 1999–2001: Budućnost
- 2001–2002: Montepaschi Siena
- 2002–2003: Hemofarm
- 2003–2004: Olimpia Milano
- 2004–2007: Hemofarm
- 2007–2008: Rethymno

Coaching
- 2015–2016: SZTE-Szedeák (assistant)
- 2017–2020: Crvena zvezda (assistant)
- 2018: Crvena zvezda (interim)
- 2021–2022: DEAC (assistant)

Career highlights
- As player: FIBA Saporta Cup champion (2002); Adriatic League champion (2005); 3× FR Yugoslav League champion (1998, 2000, 2001); As coach: 2× Serbian League champion (2018, 2019); Adriatic League champion (2019); Adriatic Supercup winner (2018)
Medals
Men's basketball
Representing (Federal Republic of Yugoslavia) FR Yugoslavia
Olympic Games
Silver medal – second place	1996 Atlanta	Team
FIBA World Championship
Gold medal – first place	1998 Greece	Team
FIBA European Championship
Gold medal – first place	1997 Spain	Team
Bronze medal – third place	1999 France	Team

Milenko Topić (Serbian Cyrillic: Миленко Топић; born 6 March 1969) is a Serbian professional basketball coach and former player.

== Playing career ==
A power forward, Topić spent most of his professional career playing in the YUBA League, representing Profikolor, BFC Beočin, Crvena zvezda, Budućnost, and Hemofarm. In the later career, he also played in Italy for Montepaschi Siena and Olimpia Milano, as well as in Greece for Rethymno, until his retirement in 2008.

== National team career ==
Topić was a member of the Yugoslavia national team (representing FR Yugoslavia) that won the silver medal at the 1996 Summer Olympics in Atlanta, Georgia, US. Over five tournament games, he averaged 2.2 points, 3.6 rebounds and one assist per game. Topić won the gold medal at EuroBasket 1997 in Spain. Over nine tournament games, he averaged 5.8 points, 2.6 rebounds and 0.6 assists per game while shooting 72.7% from the field. He was a member of the Yugoslavia team that won the gold medal at the 1998 FIBA World Championship in Athens, Greece. Over eight tournament games, he averaged 6.7 points, 4.7 rebounds and 0.8 assists per game. Topić won the bronze medal at EuroBasket 1999 in France. Over nine tournament games, he averaged 3.9 points, 2.1 rebounds and 0.6 assists per game.

== Coaching career ==
Topić spent the 2015–16 season working as an assistant coach for the Hungarian team SZTE-Szedeák.

=== Crvena zvezda ===
On 21 July 2017, Topić joined Crvena zvezda coaching staff after Serbian coach Dušan Alimpijević become their head coach for the 2017–18 season. On 8 May 2018 he became an interim head coach for the Zvezda after Alimpijević was sacked. On 10 May he made his debut in an 84–74 home win against Borac Čačak. He finished his stint undefeated with a 10–0 record. In July 2018, Milan Tomić became the head coach for Crvena zvezda while Topić was moved back to the assistant coach role. In June 2020, Crvena zvezda parted ways with him.

== Career achievements and awards ==
As head coach

- Serbian League champion: 1 (with Crvena zvezda: 2017–18)

As assistant coach

- Adriatic League champion: 1 (with Crvena zvezda: 2018–19)
- Serbian League champion: 1 (with Crvena zvezda: 2018–19)
- Adriatic Supercup winner: 1 (with Crvena zvezda: 2018)

As player

- FIBA Saporta Cup champion: 1 (with Montepaschi Siena: 2001–02)
- Adriatic League champion: 1 (with Hemofarm: 2004–05)
- FR Yugoslav League champion: 3 (with Crvena zvezda: 1997–98; with Budućnost Podgorica: 1999–00, 2000–01)

Individual

- Adriatic League season steals leader: 2006–07

== Personal life ==
His son Nikola (born 2005 in Novi Sad) is a professional basketball player in the NBA for the Oklahoma City Thunder. He was drafted in the first round of the 2024 NBA Draft. In June 2020, Nikola signed a scholarship contract with the Crvena zvezda youth system. His son made a debut for Crvena zvezda in March 2022, at age 16.

== See also ==
- List of KK Crvena zvezda head coaches
- List of father-and-son combinations who have played for Crvena zvezda
