= Aleksandar Petrović (basketball, born October 1959) =

Serbian basketball coach

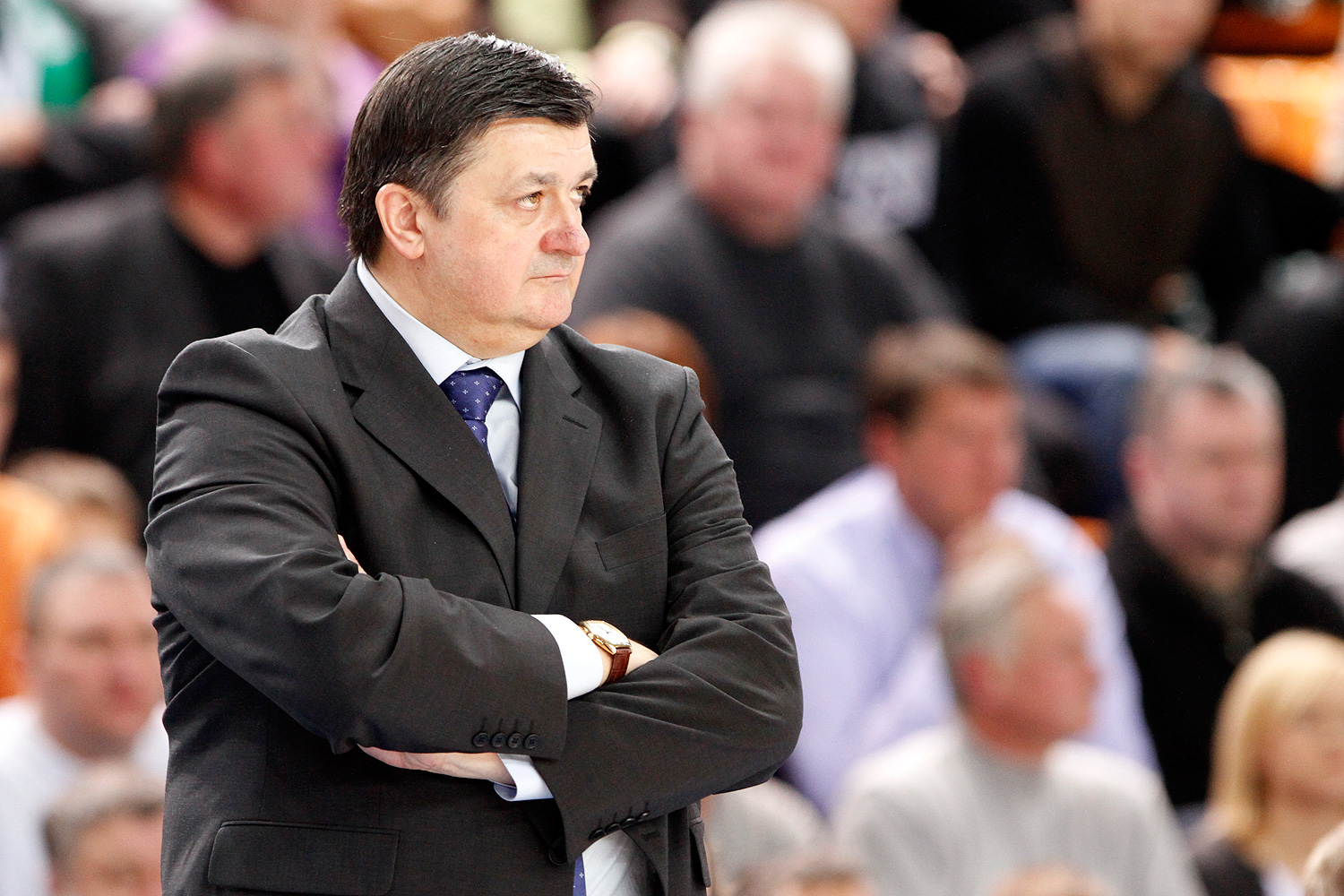
- Petrović coaching Žalgiris in 2010.

Personal information
- Born: 14 October 1959 Užička Požega, PR Serbia, FPR Yugoslavia
- Died: 1 December 2014 (aged 55) Belgrade, Serbia
- Coaching career: 1990–2013

Career history

Coaching
- Tašmajdan
- 1995–1997: Radnički Belgrade (assistant)
- Radnički Belgrade (interim)
- 1997–1998: Crvena zvezda (assistant)
- 1998–2001: FMP Železnik
- 2000–2002: FR Yugoslavia (assistant)
- 2003–2004: Hemofarm
- 2004–2007: Lokomotiv Rostov
- 2007–2009: UNICS
- 2009–2010: Serbia (assistant)
- 2009: Crvena zvezda
- 2010: Žalgiris
- 2011: FMP
- 2011: Azovmash
- 2012–2013: UNICS

Career highlights
- Russian Cup winner (2009)
Medals
Men's basketball
Assistant coach for FR Yugoslavia
World Championship
Gold medal – first place	2002 USA	Team
EuroBasket
Gold medal – first place	2001 Turkey	Team
Assistant coach for Serbia
EuroBasket
Silver medal – second place	2009 Poland	Team

Aleksandar "Aco" Petrović (Serbian Cyrillic: Александар Петровић; 14 October 1959 – 1 December 2014) was a Serbian basketball coach.

== Career ==
Petrović started his coaching career in Radnički Belgrade, where he spent four years. After that, he was assistant coach of the Crvena zvezda and won the 1997–98 Yugoslavia championship. He also led the FMP Železnik and Hemofarm Vršac from domestic clubs.

The first foreign engagement was in Russia in the team Lokomotiv Rostov, and with them he came to the final of 2005 FIBA Europe Conference North. Also, Petrović has led more than foreign clubs UNICS, Žalgiris and Azovmash.

=== National team ===
Petrović was an assistant coach of Svetislav Pešić in the national team of Yugoslavia, with whom he won gold at the 2001 European Championships in Turkey and, a year later, at the World Championships in Indianapolis. He also has a silver medal from the 2009 European Championships in Poland when he was in the coaching staff of Dušan Ivković.

== Illness and death ==
During his work at the club UNICS it was detected the disease amyotrophic lateral sclerosis, and Petović stopped coaching after that. Last UNICS game led by him was against his former club Crvena zvezda in the 2012–13 Eurocup. He died on 1 December 2014 at the age of 55.
