= KK Atlas =

Defunct basketball club in Belgrade, Serbia

Atlas
- Founded: 1972
- Dissolved: 2006
- History: KK Novi Beograd (1972–1973); KK IMT (1973–1991); KK Infos RTM (1991–1992); KK IMT-Železničar (1992–1994); KK IMT Beopetrol (1994–1997); KK Beopetrol (1997–2003); KK Atlas (2003–2006)
- Arena: New Belgrade Sports Hall
- Capacity: 5,000
- Location: Belgrade, Serbia and Montenegro
- Championships: 1 National Cup

Košarkaški klub Atlas (Serbian Cyrillic: Кошаркашки клуб Атлас), commonly referred to as KK Atlas Belgrade, was a Serbian men's professional basketball club based in Belgrade.

Founded in 1972 as KK Novi Beograd, the publicly owned club's name kept changing in accordance with sponsorship agreements over its subsequent 34-year run. Its best known name KK IMT—after its main sponsor Industrija mašina i traktora (IMT), an agricultural machinery manufacturer—was used from 1973 until 1991, a period during which the club recorded its biggest success: winning the 1986-87 Yugoslav Basketball Cup.

== History ==
Founded in 1972 as KK Novi Beograd, the club changed its name the following year, in 1973, to KK IMT (KK Industrija mašina i traktora).

For the 1983–84 season, IMT gained promotion to the Yugoslav First Federal Basketball League (top-tier basketball competition in SFR Yugoslavia). It finished the league season in 9th place. The following season 1984–85, IMT finished in 12th place and got relegated back to Yugoslav First Federal Basketball League B (Yugoslav second-tier competition).

The club achieved its greatest success under the guidance of young head coach Dragan Šakota, winning the Yugoslav Cup in the 1986–87 season at the national cup final tournament in Niš. The winning roster included veteran point guard Srećko Jarić, shooting guard Zoran Krečković, young power forward Ljubisav Luković, small forward Milan Mlađan, veteran power forward Arsenije Pešić, shooting guard Nikola Jokanović, Milenko Babić, Radivoje Milosavljević, Dragan Živanović, etc. They defeated KK Olimpija 76–73 in the final in front of 7,000 spectators at Hala Čair, with Mlađan scoring 25 points and Pešić adding 19, while Olimpija got 31 points from Matjaž Tovornik as well as veteran Peter Vilfan and young Jure Zdovc both adding 14. It was the only time in the history of Yugoslav basketball that the cup competition was won by a club not playing in the top-tier First Federal League. The same season IMT achieved promotion to the First Federal League.

Once returning to the top-tier First Federal League in 1987, it played in the top competition until the disintegration of Yugoslavia. It achieved its best placing with a 6th-place finish in the 1990–91 season.

In 1991, the club's name changed to KK Infos RTM, however, they got relegated at the end of the 1991–92 season. In 1992, another name change occurred, this time to KK IMT-Železničar.

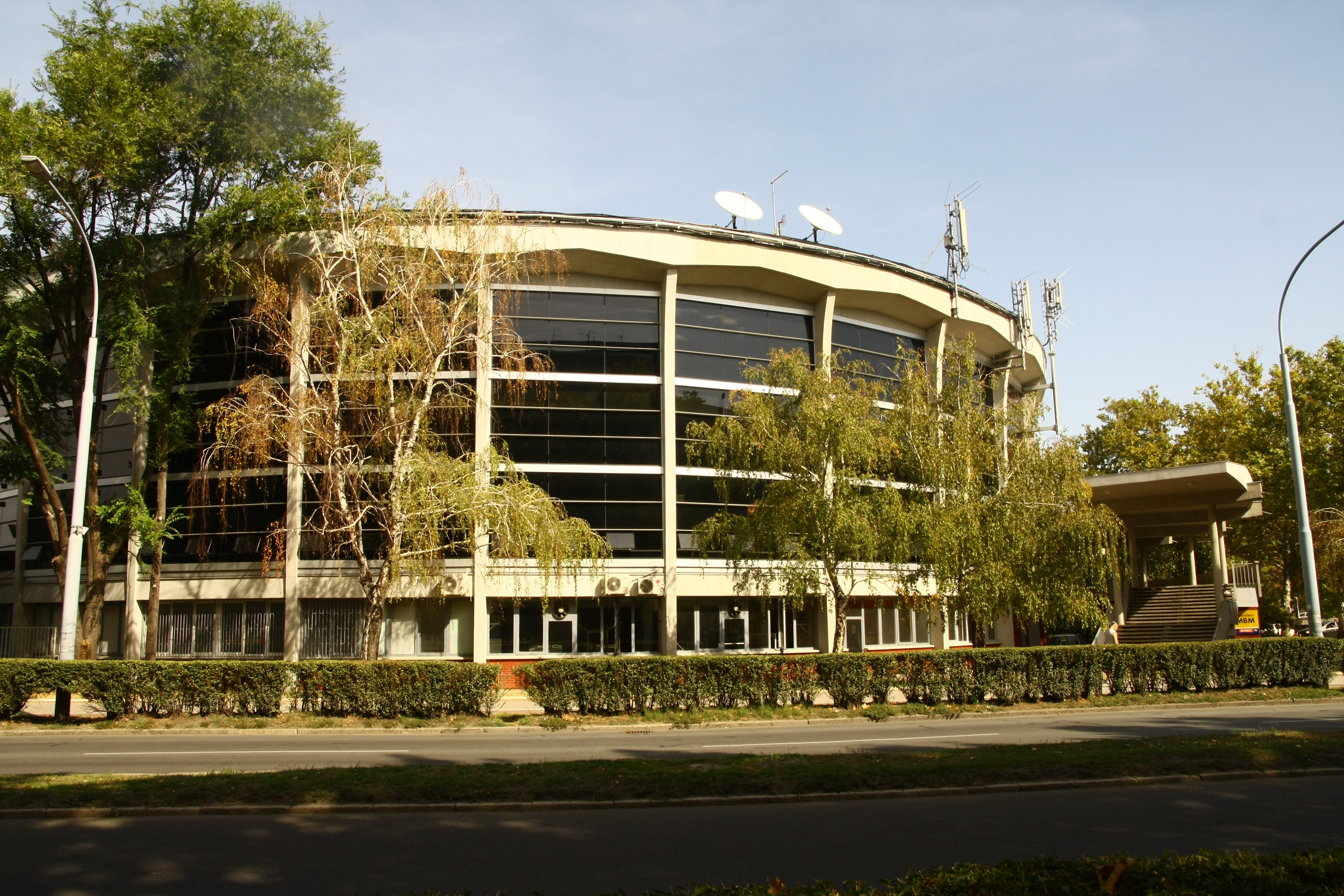
The New Belgrade Sports Hall served as the club's home arena throughout its 34-year existence.

In 1994, the club became known as KK Beopetrol. They gained promotion back to the top-tier for the 1997–98 season. In the 1998–99 season they again finished the season in 6th place thus repeating their previous best placing. During the 2001–02 season the club got relegated again due to finishing dead last.

On 27 June 2003, due to a sponsorship deal with Atlas Bank, the club changed its name to KK Atlas.

In the summer of 2006, the club sold its Basketball League of Serbia license to KK Radnički Zastava and thus stopped to competing.

== Head coaches ==
- (Socialist Federal Republic of Yugoslavia) Dragan Šakota (1983–1988)
- (Socialist Federal Republic of Yugoslavia) Milan Minić
- (Socialist Federal Republic of Yugoslavia) Rajko Toroman (1989–1991)
- (Socialist Federal Republic of Yugoslavia) Miroslav Nikolić (1991–1992)
- (Federal Republic of Yugoslavia) Zoran Krečković (1996–2000)
- (Federal Republic of Yugoslavia) Ljubisav Luković
- (Federal Republic of Yugoslavia) Slobodan Klipa (2000)
- (Federal Republic of Yugoslavia) Vojislav Vezović (2000–2001)
- (Federal Republic of Yugoslavia) Aleksandar Glišić (2001–2002)
- (Serbia and Montenegro) Predrag Badnjarević (2002–2004)
- (Serbia and Montenegro) Zoran Slavnić (2004)
- (Serbia and Montenegro) Luka Pavićević (2004–2005)
- (Serbia and Montenegro) Srećko Sekulović (2005)
- (Serbia and Montenegro) Dragan Vaščanin (2005–2006)

== Trophies and awards ==
=== Trophies ===
- Yugoslav Cup
  - Winner (1): 1986–87
- Yugoslav Federal B League
  - Winner (2): 1982–83, 1986–87
- YUBA B League
  - Winner (2): 1996–97, 2002–03

=== Awards ===
- Yugoslav League Top Scorer
  - Milan Mlađan – 1988–89

== Notable players ==
Note: Flags indicate national team eligibility at FIBA-sanctioned events. Players may hold other non-FIBA nationalities not displayed.

Criteria

To appear in this section a player must have either:

- Set a club record or won an individual award while at the club
- Played at least one official international match for their national team at any time
- Played at least one official NBA match at any time.

- (Socialist Federal Republic of Yugoslavia) Milan Mlađan
- (Socialist Federal Republic of Yugoslavia) Dragan Šakota
- (Socialist Federal Republic of Yugoslavia) Goran Grbović
- (Socialist Federal Republic of Yugoslavia) Dragoljub Vidačić
- (Serbia and Montenegro) Dušan Kecman
- (Serbia and Montenegro) Kosta Perović
- (Serbia and Montenegro) Žarko Čabarkapa
- (Serbia and Montenegro) Nikola Peković
- (United States) Delonte Holland
- (Serbia and Montenegro) Stefan Marković
- (Serbia and Montenegro) Slađan Stojković
- (Serbia and Montenegro) Mijailo Grušanović
- (Serbia and Montenegro) Rade Milutinović
- (Serbia and Montenegro) Igor Perović
- (Serbia and Montenegro) Nenad Bukumirović
- (Serbia and Montenegro) Milan Preković
- (Serbia and Montenegro) Srđan Jeković
- (Serbia and Montenegro) Nebojša Savić
- (Serbia and Montenegro) Ranko Velimirović
- (Serbia and Montenegro) Branko Sinđelić
- (Serbia and Montenegro) Ljubisav Luković
- (Serbia and Montenegro) Uroš Duvnjak
- (Serbia and Montenegro) Nebojša Zorkić

== International record ==
Season	Achievement	Notes
ULEB Cup
2003–04	Regular season	5th in Group B with Caprabo Lleida, Auna Gran Canaria, RheinEnergie Köln, Zadar, and Superfund Bulls Wien (3–7)
FIBA Saporta Cup
1987–88	Quarterfinals	4th in Group A with Limoges CSP, Bayer 04 Leverkusen, and Polycell Kingston Wien (1–5)
FIBA Korać Cup
1999–2000	Second round	Withdrew; Group C with Maccabi Haifa, Bipop Carire Reggiana, and Nikol Fert
