= YUBA B League =

- Founded: 1992
- First season: 1992–93
- Folded: 2006
- Country: (Federal Republic of Yugoslavia) FR Yugoslavia (1992–2002); Serbia and Montenegro (2002–2006)
- Confederation: FIBA Europe
- Divisions: 2
- Number of teams: 18
- Level on pyramid: 2
- Promotion to: YUBA League

The YUBA B League was the second-tier level men's professional club basketball competition in FR Yugoslavia, later Serbia and Montenegro. Founded in 1992 and folded in 2006, it was run by the Basketball Federation of Serbia and Montenegro.

== History ==
=== Yugoslavia (1992–2003) ===
Season	Champion	Runner-up	Champion's Coach	Ref.
1992–93	Mornar	Metalac	(Federal Republic of Yugoslavia) Mihailo Pavićević	
1993–94	Elkond	Privredna banka		
1994–95	FMP Železnik			
1995–96				
1996–97	Beopetrol	OKK Beograd	(Federal Republic of Yugoslavia) Zoran Krečković	
1997–98	Hemofarm	Zdravlje	(Federal Republic of Yugoslavia) Slobodan Lukić	
1998–99	Borac Čačak	Ibon Nikšić	(Federal Republic of Yugoslavia) Milovan Stepandić	
1999–2000	Zdravlje	Sloga	(Federal Republic of Yugoslavia) Jovica Arsić	
2000–01	Spartak	Primorka	(Serbia and Montenegro) Radomir Kisić	
2001–02	OKK Beograd	Lavovi 063	(Serbia and Montenegro) Predrag Jaćimović	
2002–03	Beopetrol	Ergonom	(Serbia and Montenegro) Predrag Badnjarević	

=== Serbia and Montenegro (2003–2006) ===
Serbia Group

Season	Champion	Runner-up	Champion's Coach	Ref.
2003–04	Borac Čačak	Avala Ada		
2004–05	Napredak Kruševac	Avala Ada	(Serbia and Montenegro) Aleksandar Bućan	
2005–06	Swisslion Takovo	Novi Sad	(Serbia and Montenegro) Srećko Sekulović	

Montenegro Group

Season	Champion	Runner-up	Champion's Coach	Ref.
2003–04	Mornar	Nikšić	(Serbia and Montenegro) Đorđije Pavićević	
2004–05	Rudar	ABS Primorje		
2005–06	Lovćen 1947	Danilovgrad	(Serbia and Montenegro) Dragan Radović	

== Predecessor and successors ==
Predecessor

- (Socialist Federal Republic of Yugoslavia) Yugoslav First B Federal League (1980–1992)

Successors

- Second Basketball League of Serbia (2006–present)
- (Montenegro) Montenegrin Second League (2006–present)
