= KK Zdravlje =

Basketball club in Leskovac, Serbia

Zdravlje
- Leagues: Basketball League of Serbia
- Founded: 1964; 61 years ago
- History: KK Srednjoškolac (1964–1966); OKK Leskovac (1966–1968); KK Dubočica (1968–1970); KK Zdravlje (1970–present)
- Arena: SRC Dubočica
- Capacity: 3,600
- Location: Leskovac, Serbia
- Team colors: Blue, White
- Championships: 1 National League Cup
- Website: kkzdravlje.com

Košarkaški klub Zdravlje (Serbian Cyrillic: Кошаркашки клуб Здравље), commonly referred to as KK Zdravlje or Zdravlje Leskovac, is a men's professional basketball club based in Leskovac, Serbia. They are currently competing in the top-tier Basketball League of Serbia.

== Home arena ==
The SRC Dubočica is a multi-purpose indoor arena located in Leskovac and it has a capacity of 3,600 seats.

== Players ==
=== Current roster ===
Note: Flags indicate national team eligibility at FIBA-sanctioned events. Players may hold other non-FIBA nationalities not displayed.

Zdravlje Leskovac roster
Players
Coaches

Pos.	No.	Nat.	Name	Ht.	Age
G	1	(Serbia)	Cekić, Nikola	1.90 m (6 ft 3 in)	24 – 18 December 2000
PG	3	(Serbia)	Stojković, Strahinja	1.83 m (6 ft 0 in)	27 – 20 May 1997
SG	4	(Serbia)	Jović, Dragomir	1.90 m (6 ft 3 in)	31 – 31 January 1994
F	5	(United States)	Hudson, Cornelius	2.01 m (6 ft 7 in)	31 – 29 December 1993
SG	7	(Serbia)	Petković, Miloš	1.88 m (6 ft 2 in)	25 – 18 September 1999
G/F	8	(Serbia)	Đokić, Đorđe	1.96 m (6 ft 5 in)	19 – 8 August 2005
SG	10	(Serbia)	Radivojević, Milan (C)	1.91 m (6 ft 3 in)	35 – 22 September 1989
PF	11	(Serbia)	Mitić, Nikola	2.01 m (6 ft 7 in)	19 – 21 December 2005
PF	12	(Serbia)	Stamenković, Svetozar	2.06 m (6 ft 9 in)	34 – 28 October 1990
PF	15	(Serbia)	Stajić, Vojislav	1.99 m (6 ft 6 in)	27 – 4 February 1998
PF	21	(Serbia)	Jovanović, Stevan	2.01 m (6 ft 7 in)	24 – 10 January 2001
G/F	24	(Serbia)	Jović, Miloš	1.95 m (6 ft 5 in)	27 – 28 August 1997
PG	55	(United States)	Blackwell, Noah	1.90 m (6 ft 3 in)	28 – 19 April 1996
PF	99	(Serbia)	Bjelak, Eldan	1.99 m (6 ft 6 in)	29 – 27 May 1995
PF	-	(Jamaica)	Morgan, Duana	1.98 m (6 ft 6 in)	31 – 24 July 1993
F	-	(United States)	Lampkin, Jacob	2.06 m (6 ft 9 in)

Head coach

- (Serbia) Nikola Ristić

Assistant coach(es)

- (Serbia) Predrag Tasić

Legend

- (C) Team captain
- Injured

- Roster
Updated: August 11, 2022

== Coaches ==
- (Federal Republic of Yugoslavia) Boško Đokić
- (Federal Republic of Yugoslavia) Ivan Tometić (1992–1993)
- (Federal Republic of Yugoslavia) Jovica Arsić (1999–2003)
- (Serbia) Jovica Arsić (2006–2007)
- (Serbia) Dragan Arsić (2007)
- (Serbia) Zoran Jović (2007–2008)
- (Serbia) Saša Jović (2008–2009)
- (Serbia) Ivan Zdravković (2012–2013)
- (Serbia) Saša Jović (2015)
- (Serbia) Siniša Stošić (2015–216)
- (Serbia) Saša Jović (2017–2018)
- (Serbia) Dragan Arsić (2018)
- (Serbia) Marko Dimitrijević (2018–2019)
- (Serbia) Lazar Spasić (2019–2022)
- (Serbia) Nikola Ristić (2022–present)

== Trophies and awards ==
=== Trophies ===
- Second League of Serbia (2nd-tier)
  - Winners (1): 2020–21
- Cup of Serbia (2nd-tier)
  - Winners (1): 2007–08
- Yugoslav Cup (defunct)
  - Runners-up (1): 1999–00

== Notable players ==
- (Serbia) Vukašin Aleksić
- (Serbia) Dragan Dojčin
- (Serbia) Uroš Lučić
- (Serbia) Slobodan Mitić
- (Serbia) Miljan Pavković
- (Serbia) Saša Stanković
- (Serbia) Stefan Jović

== International record ==
Season	Achievement	Notes
FIBA Korać Cup
2001–02	First round	Eliminated by Beşiktaş, 158–161 (1–1)
