= 2025–26 Basketball League of Serbia =

- League: Basketball League of Serbia
- Season: 2025–26
- Dates: 3 October 2025 – 25 April 2026 (First League); 29 April – 31 May 2026 (SuperLeague)
- Games played: 30 each (First League)
- Teams: 16 (First League); 22 (total)
- TV partner: Arena Sport

First League
- Top seed: Zlatibor Mozzart
- Season MVP: (Serbia) Aleksandar Vojinović
- Promoted: Hercegovac Gajdobra; Borac Zemun
- Relegated: Vršac Meridianbet; Sombor BC

SuperLeague
- Champions: Spartak Office Shoes (1st title)
- Runners-up: FMP
- Semi-finalists: Partizan Mozzart Bet; Crvena zvezda Meridianbet
- Final Four MVP: (Serbia) Filip Barna

Seasons
- ← 2024–25 2026–27 →

The 2025–26 Admiral Bet Basketball League of Serbia (Serbian Cyrillic: Кошаркашка лига Србије 2025–26) is the 20th season of the Basketball League of Serbia, the top-tier professional basketball league in Serbia. Also, it is the 81st national championship played by Serbian clubs inclusive of the nation's previous incarnations as Yugoslavia and Serbia & Montenegro.

Partizan Mozzart Bet is the defending champion.

== Teams ==
A total of 22 teams participate in the 2025–26 Basketball League of Serbia.

=== Distribution ===
The following is the access list for this season.

Access list for the 2025–26 Serbian League
	Teams entering in this round	Teams advancing from the previous round
First League (16 teams)	14 highest-placed teams from the last season not participating in the ABA League First Division; 2 highest-placed teams from the Second League	
Super League playoffs (8 teams)	2 best-placed teams from the First League; 6 teams participated in 2025–26 ABA League First Division	

=== Promotion and relegation ===
Teams promoted from the Second League

- KK Hercegovac Gajdobra
- KK Borac Zemun

Teams relegated to the Second League

- OKK Novi Pazar
- KK Mladost SP

=== Venues and locations ===
Location of clubs in the 2025–26 season

Club	Home city	Arena	Capacity
BKK Radnički	Belgrade	SC Šumice	1,000
Borac Mozzart	Čačak	Borac Hall	3,000
Borac Zemun	Zemun	Pinki Hall	2,000
Crvena zvezda Meridianbet	Belgrade	Belgrade Arena	5,878
Čačak 94 Quantox	Čačak	Borac Hall	3,000
Dynamic Balkan Bet	Belgrade	Ranko Žeravica Hall	5,000
FMP Soccerbet	Belgrade	Železnik Hall	3,000
Hercegovac AlingConel	Gajdobra	Gajdobra Sports Center	800
Sombor BC	Sombor	Mostonga Hall	1,000
Mega	Belgrade	Mega Factory Hall	700
Metalac	Valjevo	Valjevo Sports Hall	1,500
Mladost MaxBet	Zemun	Master Sport Center	750
OKK Beograd	Belgrade	Mega Factory Hall	700
Partizan Mozzart Bet	Belgrade	Belgrade Arena	18,386
Sloboda	Užice	Veliki Park Hall	2,200
Sloga	Kraljevo	Kraljevo Sports Hall	3,350
Spartak Office Shoes	Subotica	Dudova Šuma Sports Center	3,000
SPD Radnički	Kragujevac	Jezero Hall	3,750
Tamiš	Pančevo	Strelište Sports Hall	1,100
Vojvodina mts	Novi Sad	SPC Vojvodina	7,022
Vršac Meridianbet	Vršac	Millennium Center	4,400
Zlatibor Mozzart	Čajetina	Čajetina Sport Center	1,000

Clubs in the 2025–26 First ABA League
Clubs in the 2025–26 Second ABA League

== First League ==
=== Standings ===
Pos	Team	Pld	W	L	PF	PA	PD	Pts	Qualification or relegation
1	Zlatibor Mozzart	30	27	3	2754	2451	+303	57	Qualification to SuperLeague and ABA 2
2	Sloboda	30	22	8	2540	2330	+210	52	Qualification to SuperLeague and ABA 2
3	Hercegovac AlingConel	30	21	9	2695	2516	+179	51	Received a wildcard for ABA 2
4	Sloga	30	20	10	2666	2492	+174	50	
5	Vojvodina mts	30	18	12	2488	2458	+30	48	
6	BKK Radnički	30	16	14	2570	2546	+24	46	
7	Borac Zemun	30	14	16	2599	2696	−97	44	
8	OKK Beograd	30	14	16	2885	2879	+6	44	
9	SPD Radnički	30	13	17	2649	2676	−27	43	
10	Metalac	30	13	17	2615	2672	−57	43	
11	Tamiš	30	12	18	2484	2546	−62	42	
12	Dynamic Balkan Bet	30	12	18	2701	2847	−146	42	
13	Čačak 94 Quantox	30	12	18	2548	2628	−80	42	
14	Mladost MaxBet	30	11	19	2510	2604	−94	41	
15	Vršac Meridianbet	30	10	20	2643	2687	−44	40	Relegation to Second League
16	Sombor BC	30	5	25	2394	2713	−319	35	Relegation to Second League

Source: KLS, SrbijaSport

== SuperLeague ==
=== Qualified teams ===
First ABA League	BLS First League
1 Partizan Mozzart Bet; 2 Crvena zvezda Meridianbet; 3 Spartak Office Shoes; 4 Mega Superbet; 5 FMP; 6 Borac Mozzart	1 Zlatibor Mozzart; 2 Sloboda

=== Bracket ===
Play-in
30 April – 2 May
Partizan Mozzart Bet	2
Sloboda	0
5 – 12 May
Mega Superbet	0
FMP	2
29 April – 3 May
Crvena zvezda Meridianbet	2
Zlatibor Mozzart	1
15 May – 19 May
Spartak Office Shoes	2
Borac Mozzart	0

Semifinals; 29 May
Partizan Mozzart Bet	79
FMP	92
Crvena zvezda Meridianbet	89
Spartak Office Shoes	90

Championship game 31 May
FMP	73
Spartak Office Shoes	76

=== Play-in ===
Team 1	Series	Team 2	Game 1	Game 2	Game 3
Partizan Mozzart Bet	2–0	Sloboda	103–77	63–55	—
Mega Superbet	0–2	FMP	77–80	95–99	—
Crvena zvezda Meridianbet	2–1	Zlatibor Mozzart	112–73	89–94	116–62
Spartak Office Shoes	2–0	Borac Mozzart	83–66	75–68	—

=== Semifinals ===
==== Semifinal A ====
29 May 2026	Partizan Mozzart Bet	79–92	FMP	Čair Sports Center, Niš
16:00	Scoring by quarter: 18–25, 18–22, 17–22, 26–23
	Pts: Jones 17; Rebs: Lauvergne 6 Asts: Jones 10; PIR: Jones 23	Boxscore	Pts: Barna 26; Rebs: Gašić 10; Asts: Radosavljević 5 PIR: Barna 31	Attendance: 2,000; Referees: Uroš Obrknežević, Vladimir Jevtović, Petar Pešić

==== Semifinal B ====
29 May 2026	Crvena zvezda Meridianbet	89–90	Spartak Office Shoes	Čair Sports Center, Niš
20:00	Scoring by quarter: 22–24, 25–22, 23–21, 19–23
	Pts: Nwora 25; Rebs: Izundu 8 Asts: Butler 6 PIR: Nwora 27	Boxscore	Pts: Drobnjak 21; Rebs: Nikolić, Ilić 6 Asts: Drobnjak 7 PIR: Drobnjak 32	Attendance: 2,000; Referees: Ilija Belošević, Stefan Ćalić, Vladimir Tomić

=== Championship game ===
31 May 2026	FMP	73–76(OT)	Spartak Office Shoes	Čair Sports Center, Niš
20:00	Scoring by quarter: 19–24, 15–17, 16–22, 18–5, Overtime: 5–8
	Pts: Barna 27; Rebs: Barna 8 Asts: Scott 3 PIR: Barna 30	Boxscore	Pts: Hanlan 25; Rebs: Nikolić 10; Asts: Drobnjak 4 PIR: Hanlan 26	Attendance: 1,500; Referees: Ilija Belošević, Uroš Obrknežević, Stefan Ćalić

Starters:			Pts	Reb	Ast
G/F	88	(Serbia) Filip Barna	27	8	2
SG	10	(Serbia) Lazar Stefanović	6	4	0
SF	11	(Serbia) Dušan Radosavljević	7	3	0
PF	22	(Serbia) Aleksa Stanojević	0	2	0
C	14	(Serbia) Nikola Gašić	4	2	1
Reserves:					
C	0	(Serbia) Filip Rebrača	1	4	0
PG	2	(United States) Joshua Scott	11	3	3
PG	5	(United States) Christyon Eugene	2	4	2
PF	6	(Serbia) Marko Radovanović	9	7	0
SG	8	(Serbia) Petar Grojić	6	1	0
C	19	(Serbia) Filip Malešević	DNP		
SG	89	(Serbia) Bogdan Škarban	DNP		
Head coach:
(Basketball Federation of Serbia) Saša Nikitović

FMP	Spartak

FMP	Statistics	Spartak
13/37 (35.1%)	2-pt field goals	19/44 (43.2%)
7/26 (27.0%)	3-pt field goals	7/28 (25.0%)
26/31 (83.8%)	Free throws	17/24 (71.0%)
6	Offensive rebounds	11
32	Defensive rebounds	32
38	Total rebounds	43
8	Assists	13
11	Turnovers	15
6	Steals	4
2	Blocks	3
23	Fouls	28

Starters:			Pts	Reb	Ast
PG	4	(Montenegro) Igor Drobnjak	13	3	4
SG	7	(Canada) Olivier Hanlan	25	7	0
SF	8	(Serbia) Stefan Momirov	2	3	1
PF	34	(Montenegro) Danilo Nikolić	11	10	1
C	21	(Jamaica) Shevon Thompson	2	5	1
Reserves:					
SF	3	(Serbia) Luka Cerovina	DNP		
PF	13	(Serbia) Vojin Medarević	5	5	2
SF	20	(Bosnia and Herzegovina) Amar Gegić	2	3	1
C	22	(Serbia) Dalibor Ilić	2	5	0
SG	23	(United States) Javontae Hawkins	7	0	0
C	33	(Serbia) Boris Bodrožić	DNP		
PG	44	(Serbia) Nikola Rebić	7	2	3
Head coach:
(Basketball Federation of Serbia) Vladimir Jovanović

== MVP List ==
=== MVP of the Round ===
Round	Player	Team	PIR
Play-in
1	(Serbia) Dalibor Ilić	Spartak Office Shoes	27
2	(Serbia) Filip Barna	FMP	42
3	(Nigeria) Jordan Nwora	Crvena zvezda Meridianbet	28
Final Four
SF	(Montenegro) Igor Drobnjak	Spartak Office Shoes	32
F	(Canada) Olivier Hanlan	Spartak Office Shoes	26

== Clubs in European competitions ==
Competition	Team	Progress	Result
EuroLeague	Crvena zvezda Meridianbet	Play-in	Eliminated by (Spanish Basketball Federation) FC Barcelona
EuroLeague	Partizan Mozzart Bet	Regular season	15th (16–22)
Champions League	Spartak Office Shoes	Play-ins	Eliminated by (Hellenic Basketball Federation) Karditsa Iaponiki

== Clubs in other Regional competitions ==
Competition	Team	Progress	Result
ABA League	Partizan Mozzart Bet	Finals	
ABA League	Crvena zvezda Meridianbet	Semifinals	Eliminated by (Basketball Federation of Serbia) Partizan Mozzart Bet
ABA League	Spartak Office Shoes	Quarterfinals	Eliminated by (United Arab Emirates Basketball Association) Dubai Basketball
ABA League	Mega Superbet	Play-out	11th (12–14)
ABA League	FMP	Play-out	12th (11–15)
ABA League	Borac Mozzart	Relegation playoffs	Defeated (Basketball Federation of North Macedonia) TFT Skopje
Winline Basket Cup	Mega Superbet	Regular season Group A	3th (2–4)
ABA 2nd League	Zlatibor Mozzart	Quarterfinals	Eliminated by (Basketball Federation of North Macedonia) TFT Skopje
ABA 2nd League	Vojvodina mts	Quarterfinals	Eliminated by (Basketball Federation of Slovenia) Kansai Helios
ABA 2nd League	Vršac Meridianbet	Regular season	13th (2–6)
ABA 2nd League	SPD Radnički	Regular season	16th (0–8)

This is the season with the most basketball teams (10) from Serbia playing in any international competition: Partizan, C.zvezda (ABA1 and Euroleague), Spartak (ABA1 and BCL), FMP, Mega, Borac (ABA1), Zlatibor, Vojvodina, Vršac and SPD Radnički (ABA2).

== See also ==
- List of current Basketball League of Serbia team rosters
- 2025–26 Second Men's League of Serbia (basketball)
- 2025–26 Radivoj Korać Cup
- 2025–26 Basketball Cup of Serbia
- 2025–26 ABA League First Division
- 2025–26 ABA League Second Division
- 2025–26 First Women's Basketball League of Serbia
- 2025–26 KK Crvena zvezda season
- 2025–26 KK Partizan season
