= Marko Tejić =

Serbian basketball player

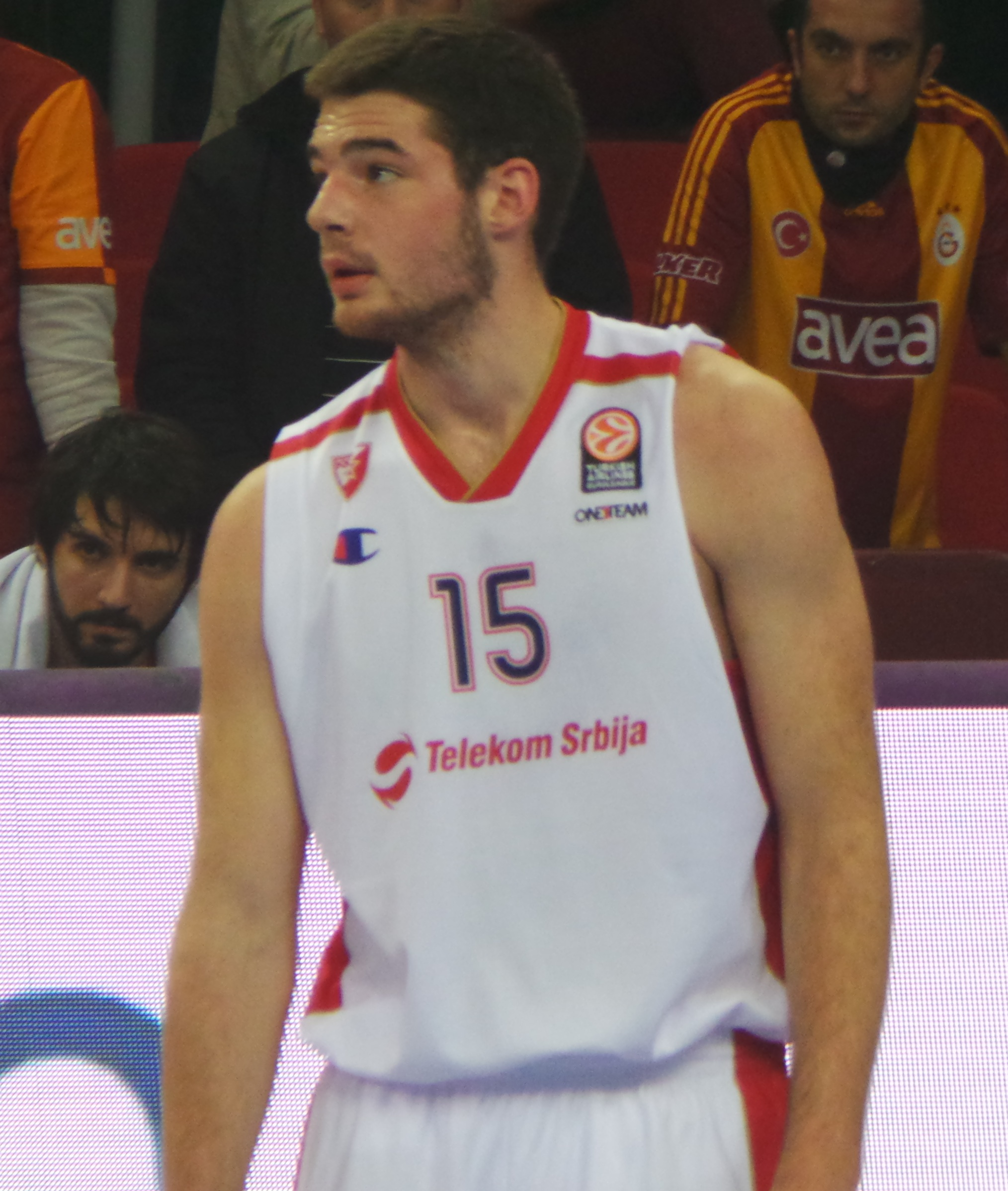
- Tejić with Crvena zvezda in November 2014

No. 15 – Iwate Big Bulls
- Position: Center / power forward
- League: B.League

Personal information
- Born: 4 August 1995 (age 31) Užice, Serbia, FR Yugoslavia
- Listed height: 2.10 m (6 ft 11 in)
- Listed weight: 105 kg (231 lb)

Career information
- NBA draft: 2017: undrafted
- Playing career: 2013–present

Career history
- 2013–2017: Crvena zvezda
- 2016: → FMP
- 2016–2017: → Mega Leks
- 2017–2018: Aries Trikala
- 2018–2019: AZS Koszalin
- 2019–2020: FMP
- 2020–2021: Studentski center
- 2021: Rytas Vilnius
- 2022: Spars
- 2022–2023: Zlatibor
- 2023–2025: Spartak Subotica
- 2025–present: Iwate Big Bulls

Career highlights
- ABA League champion (2015); Serbian League champion (2015); 2× Serbian Cup winner (2014–2015); 2× ABA League Second Division champion (2021, 2024)
Medals
Men's basketball
Representing Serbia
U20 European Championship
Bronze medal – third place	2014 Greece	Team
Gold medal – first place	2015 Italy

Marko Tejić (Serbian Cyrillic: Марко Тејић; born 4 August 1995) is a Serbian professional basketball player for Iwate Big Bulls of the Japanese B.League.

== Professional career ==
Tejić grew up with the Crvena zvezda youth team and signed a first professional contract with his club during 2013. In April 2016, he was loaned to FMP for the rest of the season. On July 21, 2016, Tejić was loaned to Mega Leks.

On September 26, 2017, Tejić joined Aries Trikala of the Greek Basket League. On July 5, 2018, he joined AZS Koszalin of the PKL.

In August 2019, Tejić signed a two-year contract for FMP. On 20 October 2020, he signed for the Montenegrin team Studentski centar.

On September 30, 2021, Tejić signed with Rytas Vilnius of the Lithuanian Basketball League. He parted ways with Rytas Vilnius in November 2021. In January 2022, he signed with Spars Sarajevo.

In August 2022, he signed a contract with the Serbian team Zlatibor.

For 2022–23 season, Tejić signed a contract with the Serbian team Spartak Subotica. In his debut season with the team, Tejić averaged 6.8 points and 3.5 rebounds over 15 ABA League Second Division games. Spartak managed to win the championship title, after defeating Vojvodina in two-game finals series.

On July 2, 2025, Tejić signed with Iwate Big Bulls of the B.League.

== Career statistics ==
Legend
GP	Games played	GS	Games started	MPG	Minutes per game
FG%	Field-goal percentage	3P%	3-point field-goal percentage	FT%	Free-throw percentage
RPG	Rebounds per game	APG	Assists per game	SPG	Steals per game
BPG	Blocks per game	PPG	Points per game	PIR	Performance index rating
**Bold**	Career high

=== Euroleague ===
Year	Team	GP	GS	MPG	FG%	3P%	FT%	RPG	APG	SPG	BPG	PPG	PIR
2013–14	Crvena zvezda	1	1	**14.8**	**.667**	.000	.000	**2.0**	**1.0**	.0	.0	**4.0**	**2.0**
2014–15	Crvena zvezda	**17**	**4**	8.9	.357	**.333**	**.375**	1.4	.7	.1	**.1**	1.6	.1
2015–16	Crvena zvezda	11	3	5.7	.200	.000	.333	1.1	.5	**.2**	**.1**	.7	.0
**Career**		29	8	7.9	.326	.222	.357	1.3	.7	.1	.1	1.3	.1
