= 2025–26 ABA League Second Division =

ABA League Second Division
- Season: 2025–26
- Teams: 16
- TV partner: Arena Sport

Regular season
- Top seed: (Basketball Federation of Bosnia and Herzegovina) Široki TT Kabeli
- Promoted: (Basketball Federation of Bosnia and Herzegovina) Široki TT Kabeli

Finals
- Champions: (Basketball Federation of Bosnia and Herzegovina) Široki TT Kabeli
- Runners-up: (Basketball Federation of North Macedonia) TFT Skopje
- Semi-finalists: (Basketball Federation of Slovenia) Kansai Helios (Basketball Federation of Montenegro) Sutjeska Elektroprivreda
- Finals MVP: (USA Basketball) D'Mitrik Trice

Records
- Biggest home win: (Basketball Federation of Serbia) Zlatibor Mozzart 113–71 (Basketball Federation of Montenegro) Mornar Barsko zlato (March 5, 2026)
- Biggest away win: (Basketball Federation of Bosnia and Herzegovina) Student m:tel 61-103 (Basketball Federation of Montenegro) Sutjeska Elektroprivreda (January 26, 2026)
- Highest scoring: (Basketball Federation of Bosnia and Herzegovina) Široki TT Kabeli 111–109 (Basketball Federation of North Macedonia) MZT Aerodrom Skopje (March 10, 2026)

The 2025–26 ABA League Second Division was the 8th season of the ABA Second Division, with teams from Bosnia and Herzegovina, Montenegro, North Macedonia, Serbia, and Slovenia participating. This was the first season without any teams from Croatia.

== Format change ==
16 clubs will participate in the second division (12 based on the results in the domestic championships and up to 4 via wild card invitation).

Competition format was changed – 16 teams were grouped into four pots, based on past results in the ABA League system and in respective domestic championship in the previous season.

Each team played eight games during the regular season (against two teams from each of the four pots), with four home games and four away games. Teams from the same country were not to face each other during the regular season. However, since Serbia had four representatives, such direct clashes could not be avoided, resulting in three matches which involved two clubs from that country.

The top eight teams from the regular season advanced to the best-of-3 format playoffs. The team with the better regular season record won home-court advantage.

== Distribution ==
The following is the access list for this season.

Access list for the 2025–26 ABA League Second Division
| | Clubs entering in this round | Clubs advancing from the previous round |
|---|---|---|
| Regular season (16 clubs) | 2 highest-placed clubs from each of the six national leagues (12 in total); 2 clubs with wild cards.; 2 teams relegated from 2024-25 ABA League first division. | |
| Top 8 (8 clubs) | | |

== Club allocation ==
Location of teams in the 2025–26 season

The labels in the parentheses show how each team qualified for the place of its starting round:

- 1st–7th: Positions in National Leagues at the end of Regular Season (or Playoffs).
- ABA1: Relegated from the First Division
- WC: Wild card.

Regular season
| (Basketball Federation of Bosnia and Herzegovina) Borac WWIN (1st) | (Basketball Federation of Montenegro) Mornar Barsko zlato (ABA1) | (Basketball Federation of Serbia) Vršac Meridianbet (1st) | (Basketball Federation of North Macedonia) MZT Aerodrom Skopje (1st) |
| (Basketball Federation of Bosnia and Herzegovina) Široki TT Kabeli (2nd) | (Basketball Federation of Montenegro) Sutjeska (2nd) | (Basketball Federation of Serbia) Zlatibor Mozzart (2nd) | (Basketball Federation of North Macedonia) TFT Skopje (2nd) |
| (Basketball Federation of Bosnia and Herzegovina) Sloboda Tuzla (4th)^{WC} | (Basketball Federation of Montenegro) Primorje 1945 (4th)^{WC} | (Basketball Federation of Serbia) Vojvodina mts (3rd)^{WC} | (Basketball Federation of Slovenia) Kansai Helios (3rd) |
| (Basketball Federation of Bosnia and Herzegovina) Jahorina (7th)^{WC} | (Basketball Federation of Montenegro) Podgorica Bemax (6th)^{WC} | (Basketball Federation of Serbia) SPD Radnički Kragujevac (8th)^{WC} | |
| (Basketball Federation of Bosnia and Herzegovina) Student m:tel (1st RS)^{WC} | (Basketball Federation of Montenegro) ~~Teodo Tivat~~ (3rd) | (Croatian Basketball Federation) ~~Cibona~~ (ABA1) | |

=== Croatian clubs controversy ===
Cedevita Junior (5th in the Croatian national championship) decided to play in 2025-26 FIBA Europe Cup. KK Kvarner (6th in the Croatian national championship) and five other Croatian teams played a qualifying tournament for the 2025–26 European North Basketball League.

After discontent from KK Cibona (because the club had not received a wild card for the 2025-26 ABA League First Division) and club's management claiming the club would not play in the Second Division, the team eventually joined the league, as refusal to play would potentially have affected club's share of ownership in the ABA League JTD. However, on October 11, only two days before the first game against TFT Skopje, KK Cibona officially abandoned its participation in the competition.

=== Wild cards ===
OKK Sloboda Tuzla and KK Vojvodina were the first two clubs getting the wild cards.

Since Croatian and many Slovenian clubs refused to play in the league, ABA League board considered giving a wild card (beside Bosnian KK Jahorina) to the Macedonian MKK Kumanovo or Bosnian SKK Student Igokea m:tel (a farm club of KK Igokea). SKK Student's application was accepted so Bosnia and Herzegovina is represented by 5 teams, which is the most that any country has had in this competition.

KK Tivat from Montenegro had been initially drawn in the competition, but was replaced before the season's start with KK Primorje 1945 Herceg Novi due to its financial difficulties.

As a substitute for KK Cibona, ABA League board invited SPD Radnički Kragujevac.

== Draw ==
The clubs were divided into four pots, based on the results in the ABA League system and in the domestic championships in the previous season, to determine 8 rounds of regular stage.

The draw set eight different opponents at random for every team, determining which of their matches were at home and which ones away. Each team faced two opponents from each of the four pots, one at home and one away.

| Pot 1 Team (Croatian Basketball Federation) Cibona (Basketball Federation of Montenegro) Mornar Barsko zlato (Basketball Federation of Serbia) Zlatibor Mozzart (Basketball Federation of Serbia) Vojvodina mts | Pot 2 Team (Basketball Federation of Slovenia) Kansai Helios (Basketball Federation of Bosnia and Herzegovina) Široki TT Kabeli (Basketball Federation of Montenegro) Podgorica Bemax (Basketball Federation of North Macedonia) MZT Aerodrom Skopje |
| Pot 3 Team (Basketball Federation of Montenegro) Sutjeska Elektroprivreda (Basketball Federation of Bosnia and Herzegovina) Borac WWIN (Basketball Federation of Serbia) Vršac Meridianbet (Basketball Federation of Bosnia and Herzegovina) Sloboda Tuzla | Pot 4 Team (Basketball Federation of Montenegro) Primorje (Basketball Federation of North Macedonia) TFT Skopje (Basketball Federation of Bosnia and Herzegovina) Jahorina (Basketball Federation of Bosnia and Herzegovina) Student m:tel |

== Regular season ==
=== League table ===
| Pos | Team | Pld | W | L | PF | PA | PD | Pts | Qualification or relegation |
|---|---|---|---|---|---|---|---|---|---|
| 1 | (Basketball Federation of Bosnia and Herzegovina) Široki TT Kabeli | 8 | 7 | 1 | 759 | 649 | +110 | 15 | Advance to the Playoffs |
| 2 | (Basketball Federation of Serbia) Zlatibor Mozzart | 8 | 6 | 2 | 753 | 656 | +97 | 14 | Advance to the Playoffs |
| 3 | (Basketball Federation of Montenegro) Sutjeska Elektroprivreda | 8 | 6 | 2 | 713 | 616 | +97 | 14 | Advance to the Playoffs |
| 4 | (Basketball Federation of Serbia) Vojvodina mts | 8 | 6 | 2 | 673 | 625 | +48 | 14 | Advance to the Playoffs |
| 5 | (Basketball Federation of Slovenia) Kansai Helios | 8 | 6 | 2 | 668 | 639 | +29 | 14 | Advance to the Playoffs |
| 6 | (Basketball Federation of Bosnia and Herzegovina) Sloboda Energoinvest Tuzla | 8 | 5 | 3 | 688 | 606 | +82 | 13 | Advance to the Playoffs |
| 7 | (Basketball Federation of North Macedonia) TFT Skopje | 8 | 5 | 3 | 681 | 642 | +39 | 13 | Advance to the Playoffs |
| 8 | (Basketball Federation of Bosnia and Herzegovina) Jahorina | 8 | 5 | 3 | 719 | 697 | +22 | 13 | Advance to the Playoffs |
| 9 | (Basketball Federation of Bosnia and Herzegovina) Borac WWIN | 8 | 5 | 3 | 625 | 614 | +11 | 13 | |
| 10 | (Basketball Federation of North Macedonia) MZT Skopje Aerodrom | 8 | 4 | 4 | 656 | 650 | +6 | 12 | |
| 11 | (Basketball Federation of Montenegro) Primorje 1945 | 8 | 2 | 6 | 615 | 688 | −73 | 10 | |
| 12 | (Basketball Federation of Bosnia and Herzegovina) Student m:tel | 8 | 2 | 6 | 637 | 715 | −78 | 10 | |
| 13 | (Basketball Federation of Serbia) Vršac Meridianbet | 8 | 2 | 6 | 639 | 735 | −96 | 10 | |
| 14 | (Basketball Federation of Montenegro) Mornar Barsko zlato | 8 | 2 | 6 | 586 | 695 | −109 | 10 | |
| 15 | (Basketball Federation of Montenegro) Podgorica Bemax | 8 | 1 | 7 | 582 | 663 | −81 | 9 | |
| 16 | (Basketball Federation of Serbia) SPD Radnički Kragujevac | 8 | 0 | 8 | 657 | 761 | −104 | 8 | |

Source: ABA2

== Results ==
Matchday 1
| Home team | Score | Away team |
|---|---|---|
| Podgorica Bemax (Montenegro) | 73–75 | (Bosnia and Herzegovina) Borac WWIN |
| MZT Aerodrom Skopje (North Macedonia) | 75–63 | (Serbia) Vršac Meridianbet |
| Široki TT Kabeli (Bosnia and Herzegovina) | 77–87 | (Montenegro) Sutjeska Elektroprivreda |
| Kansai Helios (Slovenia) | 82–80 | (Bosnia and Herzegovina) Sloboda Tuzla |
| SPD Radnički (Serbia) | 78–84 | (North Macedonia) TFT Skopje |
| Zlatibor Mozzart (Serbia) | 100–84 | (Bosnia and Herzegovina) Jahorina |
| Mornar Barsko zlato (Montenegro) | 83–69 | (Bosnia and Herzegovina) Student m:tel |
| Vojvodina mts (Serbia) | 99–82 | (Montenegro) Primorje 1945 |

Matchday 2
| Home team | Score | Away team |
|---|---|---|
| Vršac Meridianbet (Serbia) | 86–112 | (Bosnia and Herzegovina) Široki TT Kabeli |
| Sloboda Tuzla (Bosnia and Herzegovina) | 91–56 | (Montenegro) Podgorica Bemax |
| Borac WWIN (Bosnia and Herzegovina) | 79–70 | (Slovenia) Kansai Helios |
| Sutjeska Elektroprivreda (Montenegro) | 83–77 | (North Macedonia) MZT Aerodrom Skopje |
| Student m:tel (Bosnia and Herzegovina) | 96–80 | (Serbia) Zlatibor Mozzart |
| TFT Skopje (North Macedonia) | 75–71 | (Serbia) Vojvodina mts |
| Primorje 1945 (Montenegro) | 96–76 | (Serbia) SPD Radnički |
| Jahorina (Bosnia and Herzegovina) | 91–77 | (Montenegro) Mornar Barsko zlato |

Matchday 3
| Home team | Score | Away team |
|---|---|---|
| TFT Skopje (North Macedonia) | 83–84 | (Slovenia) Kansai Helios |
| Student m:tel (Bosnia and Herzegovina) | 82–85 | (North Macedonia) MZT Aerodrom Skopje |
| Jahorina (Bosnia and Herzegovina) | 91–84 | (Montenegro) Podgorica Bemax |
| Primorje 1945 (Montenegro) | 75–86 | (Bosnia and Herzegovina) Široki TT Kabeli |
| Vojvodina mts (Serbia) | 87–84 | (Bosnia and Herzegovina) Sloboda Tuzla |
| SPD Radnički (Serbia) | 78–88 | (Montenegro) Sutjeska Elektroprivreda |
| Mornar Barsko zlato (Montenegro) | 80–76 | (Serbia) Vršac Meridianbet |
| Zlatibor Mozzart (Serbia) | 85–77 | (Bosnia and Herzegovina) Borac WWIN |

Matchday 4
| Home team | Score | Away team |
|---|---|---|
| Široki TT Kabeli (Bosnia and Herzegovina) | 85–72 | (North Macedonia) TFT Skopje |
| Podgorica Bemax (Montenegro) | 63–73 | (Bosnia and Herzegovina) Student m:tel |
| Kansai Helios (Slovenia) | 86–56 | (Montenegro) Primorje 1945 |
| MZT Aerodrom Skopje (North Macedonia) | 96–77 | (Bosnia and Herzegovina) Jahorina |
| Sutjeska Elektroprivreda (Montenegro) | 79–92 | (Serbia) Zlatibor Mozzart |
| Borac WWIN (Bosnia and Herzegovina) | 90–75 | (Serbia) Vojvodina mts |
| Vršac Meridianbet (Serbia) | 100–83 | (Serbia) SPD Radnički |
| Sloboda Tuzla (Bosnia and Herzegovina) | 88–73 | (Montenegro) Mornar Barsko zlato |

Matchday 5
| Home team | Score | Away team |
|---|---|---|
| Vojvodina mts (Serbia) | 77–67 | (Montenegro) Podgorica Bemax |
| SPD Radnički (Serbia) | 77–95 | (Slovenia) Kansai Helios |
| Mornar Barsko zlato (Montenegro) | 63–102 | (Bosnia and Herzegovina) Široki TT Kabeli |
| Zlatibor Mozzart (Serbia) | 102–74 | (North Macedonia) MZT Aerodrom Skopje |
| Vršac Meridianbet (Serbia) | 98–84 | (Bosnia and Herzegovina) Student m:tel |
| Sloboda Tuzla (Bosnia and Herzegovina) | 84–64 | (Montenegro) Primorje 1945 |
| Sutjeska Elektroprivreda (Montenegro) | 110–90 | (Bosnia and Herzegovina) Jahorina |
| Borac WWIN (Bosnia and Herzegovina) | 62–80 | (North Macedonia) TFT Skopje |

Matchday 6
| Home team | Score | Away team |
|---|---|---|
| Široki TT Kabeli (Bosnia and Herzegovina) | 84–77 | (Serbia) Zlatibor Mozzart |
| Kansai Helios (Slovenia) | 72–69 | (Montenegro) Mornar Barsko zlato |
| MZT Aerodrom Skopje (North Macedonia) | 73–78 | (Serbia) Vojvodina mts |
| Podgorica Bemax (Montenegro) | 92–90 | (Serbia) SPD Radnički |
| Primorje 1945 (Montenegro) | 65–71 | (Bosnia and Herzegovina) Borac WWIN |
| Jahorina (Bosnia and Herzegovina) | 101–65 | (Serbia) Vršac Meridianbet |
| TFT Skopje (North Macedonia) | 96–91 | (Bosnia and Herzegovina) Sloboda Tuzla |
| Student m:tel (Bosnia and Herzegovina) | 61–103 | (Montenegro) Sutjeska Elektroprivreda |

Matchday 7
| Home team | Score | Away team |
|---|---|---|
| Mornar Barsko zlato (Montenegro) | 70–84 | (Serbia) Vojvodina mts |
| SPD Radnički (Serbia) | 91–104 | (Serbia) Zlatibor Mozzart |
| Kansai Helios (Slovenia) | 80–102 | (Bosnia and Herzegovina) Široki TT Kabeli |
| MZT Aerodrom Skopje (North Macedonia) | 67–54 | (Montenegro) Podgorica Bemax |
| Borac WWIN (Bosnia and Herzegovina) | 59–85 | (Montenegro) Sutjeska Elektroprivreda |
| TFT Skopje (North Macedonia) | 107–79 | (Bosnia and Herzegovina) Student m:tel |
| Sloboda Tuzla (Bosnia and Herzegovina) | 88–70 | (Serbia) Vršac Meridianbet |
| Primorje 1945 (Montenegro) | 81–93 | (Bosnia and Herzegovina) Jahorina |

Matchday 8
| Home team | Score | Away team |
|---|---|---|
| Podgorica Bemax (Montenegro) | 93–99 | (Slovenia) Kansai Helios |
| Student m:tel (Bosnia and Herzegovina) | 93–96 | (Montenegro) Primorje 1945 |
| Vojvodina mts (Serbia) | 102–84 | (Serbia) SPD Radnički |
| Vršac Meridianbet (Serbia) | 81–112 | (Bosnia and Herzegovina) Borac WWIN |
| Sutjeska Elektroprivreda (Montenegro) | 78–82 | (Bosnia and Herzegovina) Sloboda Tuzla |
| Jahorina (Bosnia and Herzegovina) | 92–84 | (North Macedonia) TFT Skopje |
| Zlatibor Mozzart (Serbia) | 113–71 | (Montenegro) Mornar Barsko zlato |
| Široki TT Kabeli (Bosnia and Herzegovina) | 111–109 | (North Macedonia) MZT Aerodrom Skopje |

== Playoffs ==
=== Seeds ===
Best-of-three playoffs, with the higher seed having home court advantage

1. (Basketball Federation of Bosnia and Herzegovina) Široki TT Kabeli (champion)

2. (Basketball Federation of Serbia) Zlatibor Mozzart (quarterfinals)

3. (Basketball Federation of Montenegro) Sutjeska Elektroprivreda (semifinals)

4. (Basketball Federation of Serbia) Vojvodina mts (quarterfinals)

5. (Basketball Federation of Slovenia) Kansai Helios (semifinals)

6. (Basketball Federation of Bosnia and Herzegovina) Sloboda Energoinvest Tuzla (quarterfinals)

7. (Basketball Federation of North Macedonia) TFT Skopje (final)

8. (Basketball Federation of Bosnia and Herzegovina) Jahorina (quarterfinals)

== Quarterfinals ==
| Team 1 | Series | Team 2 | Game 1 | Game 2 | Game 3 |
|---|---|---|---|---|---|
| (1) (Basketball Federation of Bosnia and Herzegovina) Široki TT Kabeli | 2–0 | (8) (Basketball Federation of Bosnia and Herzegovina) Jahorina | 74–64 | 78–71 | — |
| (4) (Basketball Federation of Serbia) Vojvodina mts | 0–2 | (5) (Basketball Federation of Slovenia) Kansai Helios | 76–87 | 71–80 | — |
| (2) (Basketball Federation of Serbia) Zlatibor Mozzart | 1–2 | (7) (Basketball Federation of North Macedonia) TFT Skopje | 101–86 | 79–87 | 80–90 |
| (3) (Basketball Federation of Montenegro) Sutjeska Elektroprivreda | 2–0 | (6) (Basketball Federation of Bosnia and Herzegovina) Sloboda Energoinvest Tuzla | 96–94 [OT] | 78–71 | — |

== Semifinals ==
| Team 1 | Series | Team 2 | Game 1 | Game 2 | Game 3 |
|---|---|---|---|---|---|
| (1) (Basketball Federation of Bosnia and Herzegovina) Široki TT Kabeli | 2–0 | (5) (Basketball Federation of Slovenia) Kansai Helios | 92–82 | 84–80 | — |
| (3) (Basketball Federation of Montenegro) Sutjeska Elektroprivreda | 0–2 | (7) (Basketball Federation of North Macedonia) TFT Skopje | 88–93 | 77–90 | — |

== Finals ==
| Team 1 | Series | Team 2 | Game 1 | Game 2 | Game 3 |
|---|---|---|---|---|---|
| (1) (Basketball Federation of Bosnia and Herzegovina) Široki TT Kabeli | 2–0 | (7) (Basketball Federation of North Macedonia) TFT Skopje | 88–69 | 87–86 | — |
