= 2026–27 ABA League Second Division =

ABA League Second Division
- Season: 2026–27
- Teams: 16
- TV partner: Arena Sport

The 2026–27 ABA League Second Division is the 9th season of the ABA Second Division.

== Format change ==
16 clubs are divided into four regular season groups consisting of four clubs. In each group, clubs play each other in a home-and-away round-robin system. Best-placed clubs of each group advance directly into the Playoffs. Second and third-place participate in the play-in round. The quarterfinals, semifinals and finals are played in a best-of-three series format.

== Distribution ==
The following is the access list for this season.

Access list for the 2026–27 ABA League Second Division
	Entering in this round
Regular season (16 clubs)	2 highest-placed clubs from each of the six national leagues (12 in total); 4 clubs with wild cards
Playoffs (8 clubs)	4 first-placed clubs from each regular season group; 4 winners of play-in maches

== Club allocation ==
Location of teams in the 2026–27 season

The labels in parentheses show how each club qualified for the competition:

- 1st–9th: Positions in national leagues at the end of the regular season (or playoffs)
- RW: Winners of the regular season of the national league
- WC: Wild card

Regular season
(Basketball Federation of Montenegro) Sutjeska Elektroprivreda Nikšić (1st)	(Basketball Federation of Serbia) Zlatibor Mozzart (1st)	(Basketball Federation of Bosnia and Herzegovina) Sloboda Energoinvest (4th)
(Basketball Federation of Montenegro) Primorje 1945 (2nd)	(Basketball Federation of Serbia) Sloboda Užice (2nd)	(Basketball Federation of Bosnia and Herzegovina) Borac WWIN (5th)
(Basketball Federation of Montenegro) Mornar-Barsko zlato (3rd)^{WC}	(Basketball Federation of Serbia) Hercegovac Aling-Conel (3rd)^{WC}	(Basketball Federation of Bosnia and Herzegovina) Basket Živinice (9th)^{WC}
(Basketball Federation of Montenegro) Podgorica Bemax (6th)^{WC}	(Basketball Federation of Serbia) Vojvodina mts (5th)^{WC}	(Basketball Federation of North Macedonia) MZT Skopje Aerodrom (1st)
(Croatian Basketball Federation) Virtus Zagreb (10th)	(Basketball Federation of Slovenia) GGD Šenčur (3rd)	(Basketball Federation of North Macedonia) TFT Skopje (RW)
(Basketball Federation of Slovenia) ECE Triglav Kranj (5th)		

The competition was initially planned to feature 18 clubs, but the number of participants was reduced to 16 following several withdrawals. On 3 October 2026, the ABA League Assembly confirmed a revised competition format consisting of four groups of four teams each, following the withdrawal of Basketball Club Skopje. GGD Šenčur was subsequently moved from Group B to Group A.

KK Split, relegated from the ABA League First Division, opted to participate in the FIBA Europe Cup as its only international competition for the season.

Kansai Helios withdrew due to financial difficulties.

== Regular season ==
The 16 teams were divided into four groups of four teams each. Each team plays the other teams in its group twice, once at home and once away. The group winners advance directly to the quarter-finals, while the second- and third-placed teams qualify for the play-in round.

=== Group A ===
Pos	Team	Pld	W	L	PF	PA	PD	Pts	Qualification	VOJ	SEN	MOR	BOR
1	(Basketball Federation of Serbia) Vojvodina mts	2	2	0	155	138	+17	4	Qualification for quarter-finals	—	79–76		76–62
2	(Basketball Federation of Slovenia) GGD Šenčur	2	1	1	157	150	+7	3	Qualification for play-in round		—	81–71	
3	(Basketball Federation of Montenegro) Mornar-Barsko zlato	2	1	1	148	154	−6	3	Qualification for play-in round			—	
4	(Basketball Federation of Bosnia and Herzegovina) Borac WWIN	2	0	2	135	153	−18	2				73–77	—

Updated to match(es) played on 30 October 2026. Source: ABA League 2

=== Group B ===
Pos	Team	Pld	W	L	PF	PA	PD	Pts	Qualification	SLT	HER	POD	TFT
1	(Basketball Federation of Bosnia and Herzegovina) Sloboda Energoinvest	2	2	0	218	157	+61	4	Qualification for quarter-finals	—			106–61
2	(Basketball Federation of Serbia) Hercegovac Aling-Conel	2	2	0	183	146	+37	4	Qualification for play-in round		—	76–64	107–82
3	(Basketball Federation of Montenegro) Podgorica Bemax	2	0	2	160	188	−28	2	Qualification for play-in round	96–112		—	
4	(Basketball Federation of North Macedonia) TFT Skopje	2	0	2	143	213	−70	2					—

Updated to match(es) played on 4 November 2026. Source: ABA League 2

=== Group C ===
Pos	Team	Pld	W	L	PF	PA	PD	Pts	Qualification	SUT	TRI	SLU	MZT
1	(Basketball Federation of Montenegro) Sutjeska Elektroprivreda Nikšić	2	2	0	172	155	+17	4	Qualification for quarter-finals	—	87–80		85–75
2	(Basketball Federation of Slovenia) ECE Triglav Kranj	2	1	1	158	163	−5	3	Qualification for play-in round		—	78–76	
3	(Basketball Federation of Serbia) Sloboda Užice	1	0	1	76	78	−2	1	Qualification for play-in round			—	
4	(Basketball Federation of North Macedonia) MZT Skopje Aerodrom	1	0	1	75	85	−10	1					—

Updated to match(es) played on 3 November 2026. Source: ABA League 2

=== Group D ===
Pos	Team	Pld	W	L	PF	PA	PD	Pts	Qualification	ZLA	PRI	ZIV	VIR
1	(Basketball Federation of Serbia) Zlatibor Mozzart	2	2	0	200	178	+22	4	Qualification for quarter-finals	—	101–98	99–80	
2	(Basketball Federation of Montenegro) Primorje 1945	2	1	1	189	182	+7	3	Qualification for play-in round		—		91–81
3	(Basketball Federation of Bosnia and Herzegovina) Basket Živinice	2	1	1	143	159	−16	3	Qualification for play-in round			—	63–60
4	(Croatian Basketball Federation) Virtus Zagreb	2	0	2	141	154	−13	2					—

Updated to match(es) played on 28 October 2026. Source: ABA League 2
