= 2023–24 ABA League Second Division =

European basketball league

ABA League Second Division
- Season: 2023–24
- Duration: October 2023 – TBA
- Games played: 13 each
- Teams: 14
- TV partner: Arena Sport

Finals
- Champions: (Serbia) Spartak Office Shoes
- Runners-up: (Serbia) Vojvodina mts
- Semifinalists: (North Macedonia) MZT Skopje Aerodrom (Montenegro) Podgorica
- Finals MVP: (Serbia) Filip Barna
- All statistics correct as of February 26, 2022.

The 2023–24 ABA League Second Division is the 6th season of the ABA Second Division with 14 teams from Bosnia and Herzegovina, Croatia, Montenegro, North Macedonia, Serbia, and Slovenia participating in it.

== Clubs ==
Location of teams in the 2023–24 season

A total of 14 clubs contest the league for the 2023–24 season, based on the results in the domestic championships and taking into consideration the results in the previous season.

=== Distribution ===
The following is the access list for this season. This season, instead of wild card invitation, qualification rounds determine one participant.

Access list for the 2023–24 ABA League Second Division
	Clubs entering in this round	Clubs advancing from the previous round
Regular season (14 clubs)	2 highest-placed clubs from each of the six national leagues (12 in total); 1 club relegated from the 2022-23 ABA League First Division; 1 club winner of the qualifying tournament	
Playoffs (8 clubs)		

=== Club allocation ===
The labels in the parentheses show how each team qualified for the place of its starting round:

- 1st–5th: Positions in national leagues at the end of regular season or playoffs.
- ABA1: Relegated from the First Division.

Regular season
(Bosnia and Herzegovina) Borac WWIN (2nd)	(Montenegro) Sutjeska (1st)	(North Macedonia) MZT Skopje Aerodrom (ABA1)	(Slovenia) Kansai Helios (2nd)
(Bosnia and Herzegovina) Široki TT Kabeli (3rd)	(Montenegro) Podgorica (2nd)	(North Macedonia) Pelister (2nd)	(Slovenia) GGD Šenčur (3rd)
(Croatia) Cedevita (4th)	(Serbia) Zlatibor Gold Gondola (1st)	(North Macedonia) TFT Mozzart Skopje (3rd)	
(Croatia) Šibenka (5th)	(Serbia) Spartak Office Shoes (2nd)		
Qualifying round
(Bosnia and Herzegovina) Bosna Meridianbet (5th)	(Bosnia and Herzegovina) Spars Ilidža (8th)	(Serbia) Vojvodina MTS (3rd)	(Slovenia) Ilirija (4th)

== Qualifying rounds ==
4 teams competed in two preliminary rounds. Teams were paired in two-legged matches, with winners decided on aggregate score.

=== First preliminary round ===
Games were played from September 21 to and September 26. Winners advanced to the second preliminary round.

Team 1	Agg.	Team 2	1st leg	2nd leg
Bosna Meridianbet (Bosnia and Herzegovina)	160–141	(Slovenia) Ilirija	83–71	77–70
Spars Ilidža (Bosnia and Herzegovina)	158–193	(Serbia) Vojvodina MTS	81–97	77–94

=== Second preliminary round ===
Games were played on October 1 and October 4. Winner advanced to the regular season stage.

Team 1	Agg.	Team 2	1st leg	2nd leg
Bosna Meridianbet (Bosnia and Herzegovina)	152–163	(Serbia) Vojvodina MTS	75–78	77–85

== Regular season ==
The Regular season is split in five tournaments featuring two or three rounds.

=== League table ===
Pos	Team	Pld	W	L	PF	PA	PD	Pts	Qualification or relegation
1	(Serbia) Spartak Office Shoes	13	11	2	1119	994	+125	24	Advance to the Playoffs
2	(Serbia) Vojvodina MTS	13	10	3	1031	926	+105	23	Advance to the Playoffs
3	(Serbia) Zlatibor Gold Gondola	13	10	3	1152	1026	+126	23	Advance to the Playoffs
4	(Bosnia and Herzegovina) Široki TT Kabeli	13	9	4	1012	918	+94	22	Advance to the Playoffs
5	(North Macedonia) MZT Skopje Aerodrom	13	8	5	1088	1017	+71	21	Advance to the Playoffs
6	(Montenegro) Podgorica	13	8	5	1026	1011	+15	21	Advance to the Playoffs
7	(Montenegro) Sutjeska	13	6	7	1000	1017	−17	19	Advance to the Playoffs
8	(Slovenia) Kansai Helios	13	6	7	925	933	−8	19	Advance to the Playoffs
9	(Bosnia and Herzegovina) Borac WWIN	13	6	7	866	873	−7	19	
10	(North Macedonia) Pelister	13	5	8	1004	1043	−39	18	
11	(Slovenia) GGD Šenčur	13	4	9	964	1035	−71	17	
12	(Croatia) Cedevita	13	4	9	985	1059	−74	17	
13	(Croatia) Šibenka	13	2	11	970	1087	−117	15	
14	(North Macedonia) TFT Mozzart Skopje	13	2	11	912	1053	−141	15	

Updated to match(es) played on 22 December 2023. Source: ABA2

== Playoffs ==
Based on the results and position of the clubs in the standings after the regular season, Playoffs will take place with teams from 1st to 8th position. The Quarterfinals will be played in knockout pairs 1–8, 2–7, 3–6, 4–5. The winners of the Quarterfinals will qualify to the Semifinals and the winners of the Semifinals will play the Final.

=== Bracket ===
Knock-out elimination phases will be played under two-game format. Better placed team plays second leg at home court.

Quarterfinals
9-16 April
1 (Serbia) Spartak Office Shoes	84	79	163
8 (Slovenia) Kansai Helios	71	68	139
10-17 April
4 (Bosnia and Herzegovina) Široki TT Kabeli	69	70	139
5 (North Macedonia) MZT Skopje Aerodrom	85	68	153
9-17 April
2 (Serbia) Vojvodina MTS	89	81	170
7 (Montenegro) Sutjeska	84	70	154
10-16 April
3 (Serbia) Zlatibor Gold Gondola	89	93	182
6 (Montenegro) Podgorica	113	100	213

Semifinals
27 April-5 May
(Serbia) Spartak Office Shoes	78	98	176
(North Macedonia) MZT Skopje Aerodrom	73	64	137
24 April-2 May
(Serbia) Vojvodina MTS	80	97	177
(Montenegro) Podgorica	98	55	153

Final
9-16 May
(Serbia) Spartak Office Shoes	74	80	154
(Serbia) Vojvodina MTS	73	74	147
