= Stefan Momirov =

Serbian basketball player

No. 7 – Oldenburg
- Position: Shooting guard / small forward
- League: Basketball Bundesliga

Personal information
- Born: 18 December 1999 (age 26) Vršac, Serbia, FR Yugoslavia
- Listed height: 1.98 m (6 ft 6 in)
- Listed weight: 96 kg (212 lb)

Career information
- NBA draft: 2021: undrafted
- Playing career: 2016–present

Career history
- 2016: Izbište
- 2017–2020: FMP
- 2018: →Vršac
- 2020–2021: Mega
- 2021–2022: Kolossos Rodou
- 2022–2024: Breogán
- 2024–2026: Spartak Subotica
- 2026–present: Baskets Oldenburg

Career highlights
- Serbian League champion (2026)
Medals
Men's basketball
Representing Serbia
FIBA Europe Under-18 Championship
Gold medal – first place	2017 Slovakia	U18 Team

Stefan Momirov (Serbian Cyrillic: Стефан Момиров; born 18 December 1999) is a Serbian professional basketball player for Baskets Oldenburg of the Basketball Bundesliga (BBL). He also represents the Serbian national team.

== Early career ==
Momirov started to play basketball for the youth system of Crvena zvezda. He played the Euroleague Basketball Next Generation Tournaments for the Crvena zvezda U18 (2015–2017).

== Professional career ==
Prior to the 2017–18 season, he was loaned to FMP from Belgrade. He appeared in two ABA League First Division games with FMP. In December 2017, Momirov signed a multi-year contract with FMP and went on a loan to his hometown-based team Vršac for the rest of the 2017–18 season In March 2020, he parted ways with FMP. In May 2020, after the COVID-19 pandemic ban, he joined a training camp of Partizan.

On 28 August 2020, Momirov signed a two-year contract for Mega Bemax.

In July 2021, he signed with the Greek club Kolossos Rodou. In 26 games, he averaged 6.6 points, 3.6 rebounds, 1.1 assists and 1 steal, playing around 27 minutes per contest.

== National team career ==
Momirov was a member of the Serbian U-18 national basketball team that won the gold medal at the 2017 FIBA Europe Under-18 Championship. Over seven tournament games, he averaged 7.1 points, 3.1 rebounds, and 2.6 assists per game. He also participated at the 2016 FIBA Europe Under-18 Championship. Momirov was a member of the Serbian under-20 team that finished 15th at the 2019 FIBA U20 European Championship in Tel Aviv, Israel. Over seven tournament games, he averaged 8.4 points, 7.9 rebounds, and 3.6 assists per game.

== Personal life ==
Momirov is a son of basketball players Snežana Pavlović and Jovan Momirov. His mother is a former Serbian professional basketball player who played for Radnički Kragujevac, Hemofarm Vršac, MiZo-Pécsi VSK and represented FR Yugoslavia national team internationally. She was a national team member at the EuroBasket Women 1995. His father played for Vršac and Profikolor during his career.
