= Jermaine Bishop =

American basketball player (born 1997)

Free agent
- Position: Point guard / shooting guard

Personal information
- Born: February 22, 1997 (age 29) Queens, New York, U.S.
- Listed height: 6 ft 1 in (1.85 m)
- Listed weight: 185 lb (84 kg)

Career information
- High school: Holy Cross (Flushing, New York)
- College: Saint Louis (2015–2017); Norfolk State (2019–2020)
- NBA draft: 2020: undrafted
- Playing career: 2020–present

Career history
- 2020–2021: Phoenix Hagen
- 2021: Indios de Mayagüez
- 2021–2023: TFT
- 2023: Leones de Ponce
- 2024: Vaqueros de Bayamón
- 2024: Criollos de Caguas

Career highlights
- Macedonian Cup winner (2022); First-team All-MEAC (2020); Atlantic 10 All-Rookie Team (2016)

Jermaine Bishop (born February 22, 1997) is an American professional basketball player who most recently played for the Vaqueros de Bayamón of the Baloncesto Superior Nacional (BSN). He played college basketball for the Norfolk State Spartans and Saint Louis Billikens.

== High school career ==
Jermaine Bishop attended Holy Cross High School in Flushing, New York. As a senior in 2014–15, he averaged 20.6 points and 5.3 assists per game while helping the Knights to an appearance in the Catholic High School Athletic Association (CHSAA) AA intersectional semi-finals, the squad's deepest run since 2012. He graduated as Holy Cross' third-leading varsity scorer with 1,375 career points, trailing only Sylven Landesberg and Derrick Chievous.

== College career ==
As a freshman at Saint Louis in 2015–16, Bishop played in 27 games with 16 starting assignments, averaging 8.9 points, 2.0 rebounds and 2.3 assists in 20.8 minutes per game. A three-time A-10 Rookie of the Week honoree during the 2015–16 season, the first Billiken since 2009 to claim this honor. Bishop led the Billikens in scoring (11.7 ppg) and assists (3.2 apg) in conference games, becoming the first Billiken freshman to lead his team in those categories since SLU joined the A-10 in 2005–06. His free-throw percentage (.864, 51-of-59) was sixth all-time in SLU history and the top mark by a freshman in SLU annals. He recorded three 20-plus games as a freshman, scoring 21 points against Duquesne on January 13, a career-high 23 points against Davidson on January 20, and 20 points against George Mason on February 17, a contest where he hit the game-winning basket in overtime. He subsequently earned A-10 All-Rookie Team honors at the season's end.

As a sophomore at Saint Louis in 2016–17, Bishop played only in 9 games with 9 starting assignments. Nine games into the season, he suffered an ankle injury and was awarded a medical redshirt. At the time of his injury, Bishop was leading the Billikens in scoring and assists, he averaged 11.6 points and 4.7 assists per game. He poured in a career-high 27 points on 11-of-23 shooting (4-of-9 from 3-point range) against BYU in Las Vegas and led the Billikens in scoring against Kansas State with 11 points and Wichita State with 12 points.

As a redshirt sophomore at Saint Louis in 2017–18, Bishop did not compete for personal reasons.

Bishop transferred to Norfolk State University for his 2018–19 redshirt junior year. He sat out the season due to NCAA rules as a Division I transfer.

In his senior season, he was named to the First Team All-Mid-Eastern Athletic Conference, the first player for Norfolk since 2017. He also made his way onto the National Association of Basketball Coaches (NABC) All-District 15 second team, and the BOXTOROW HBCU Division I All-America second team. In addition, he earned a spot on the College Sports Information Directors (CoSIDA) Division I Academic All-District 3 team, the first basketball player in NSU history to earn academic all-district accolades. Bishop competed in and started all 31 games; averaged 15.6 points and 3.5 rebounds per game (averaged 18.5 points in MEAC games). For the year, he totaled 483 points, 109 rebounds, 69 assists, 32 steals and four blocks.

Bishop set the school record for 3-pointers (98) and 3-point attempts (248), breaking the previous marks of 92 (set in 2018–19 and 1986–87) and 237 (set 2007–08), respectively. Ranked first in the MEAC in 3-point field goals (3.2), second in free throw percentage (85.5), fourth in scoring (15.6), fifth in 3-point field goal percentage (39.5), seventh in minutes (33.4), and 15th in assists (2.2). In MEAC games only, led the league in 3-point field goals (3.8) and free throw percentage (87.2) and stood second in scoring (18.5), fourth in 3-point field goal percentage (41.8), ninth in minutes (34.6), and 14th in steals (1.2). Bishop ranked 11th in the nation in 3-point field goals (3.16) and 31st in 3-point field goal percentage. After just one season, he ended the year ranked ninth in NSU career records in 3-point field goal percentage and 19th in 3-pointers. He declared for the 2020 NBA draft.

== Professional career ==
On July 21, 2020, Bishop signed with Phoenix Hagen of the German ProA league.

On May 28, 2021, Bishop signed with the Indios de Mayagüez (basketball) of the Baloncesto Superior Nacional (BSN). Bishop was selected by the Indios de Mayagüez in the BSN Draft in the first round with the fourth pick.

On December 23, 2021, Bishop signed with the TFT of both the Macedonian League and Balkan International Basketball League (BIBL). On February 20, 2022, TFT won their first trophy in club history, the Cup of Macedonia, the second most important national basketball title in North Macedonia after the Macedonian First League (basketball).

Bishop re-signed with the Indios de Mayagüez (basketball) of the Baloncesto Superior Nacional (BSN) for the 2022 season. Due to the extended season with TFT he only played 9 games.

On October 10, 2022, Bishop re-signed with the TFT of both the Macedonian League and ABA League Second Division (ABA2 League).

On February 9, 2023, Bishop was traded from the Indios de Mayagüez (basketball) of the Baloncesto Superior Nacional (BSN) to the Leones de Ponce (basketball).

== Career statistics ==
Legend
| GP | Games played | GS | Games started | MPG | Minutes per game |
| FG% | Field goal percentage | 3P% | 3-point field goal percentage | FT% | Free throw percentage |
| RPG | Rebounds per game | APG | Assists per game | SPG | Steals per game |
| BPG | Blocks per game | PPG | Points per game | **Bold** | Career high |

=== College ===
| Year | Team | GP | GS | MPG | FG% | 3P% | FT% | RPG | APG | SPG | BPG | PPG |
|---|---|---|---|---|---|---|---|---|---|---|---|---|
| 2015–16 | Saint Louis | 27 | 16 | 20.8 | .406 | .326 | .864 | 2.0 | 2.3 | .4 | .1 | 8.9 |
| 2016–17 | Saint Louis | 9 | 9 | 32.2 | .362 | .366 | .813 | 2.9 | 4.7 | 1.7 | .3 | 11.6 |
| 2019–20 | Norfolk | 31 | 31 | 33.4 | .405 | .395 | .855 | 3.5 | 2.2 | 1.0 | .1 | 15.6 |

=== Professional ===
| Year | Team | GP | GS | MPG | FG% | 3P% | FT% | RPG | APG | SPG | BPG | PPG |
|---|---|---|---|---|---|---|---|---|---|---|---|---|
| 2020–21 | Phoenix Hagen | 26 | 24 | 27.1 | .452 | .368 | .750 | 2.7 | 3.5 | 1.2 | 0.1 | 11.5 |
| 2021 | Indios de Mayagüez (basketball) | 29 | -- | 20.4 | .355 | .412 | .786 | 1.9 | 3.1 | 0.6 | 0.1 | 7.7 |
| 2021–22 | KK TFT | 13 | 12 | 28.6 | .526 | .316 | .727 | 2.6 | 3.9 | 1 | 0 | 11.6 |
| 2021–22 | KK TFT | 7 | 7 | 26.6 | .471 | .302 | .750 | 2.7 | 3.7 | 0.4 | 0.1 | 11 |
| 2022–23 | KK TFT | 13 | 13 | 24.2 | .418 | .371 | .778 | 3 | 3.8 | 1.2 | 0.1 | 10.2 |
| 2022–23 | KK TFT | 10 | 10 | 28.6 | .469 | .350 | .737 | 2.4 | 2.7 | 1.3 | 0 | 10.2 |
