= Darko Vujačić =

Montenegrin basketball coach and player

Sutjeska
- Title: Head coach
- League: ABA League; Prva A Liga

Personal information
- Born: 10 April 1979 (age 47) Nikšić, SR Montenegro, Yugoslavia
- Listed height: 1.98 m (6 ft 6 in)
- Listed weight: 90 kg (198 lb)

Career information
- NBA draft: 2001: undrafted
- Playing career: 1997–2014
- Position: Shooting guard
- Coaching career: 2014–present

Career history

Playing
- 2000–2003: Sutjeska
- 2003–2005: Lovćen
- 2005–2006: Mornar
- Peja
- Leotar
- 2008: Radnicki Novi Sad
- 2009: Marso NYKK
- 2009–2012: CSU Pitești
- 2012–2013: Energia Rovinari
- 2013: Sutjeska
- 2013–2014: Ulcinj

Coaching
- 2014–2015: Ulcinj (assistant)
- 2015: Vllaznia
- 2015–2016: Ulcinj (assistant)
- 2016–2019: Ulcinj
- 2020: Vllaznia
- 2021: Goga Basket
- 2022–present: Sutjeska

Darko Vujačić (born 8 February 1978) is a Montenegrin professional basketball coach and former player who is the head coach for Sutjeska of the Prva A Liga and ABA League Second Division.

== Playing career ==
During his playing days a shooting guard, Vujačić played for Sutjeska, Lovćen, Mornar, Peja, Leotar, Radnicki Novi Sad, Marso NYKK, CSU Pitești, Energia Rovinari, and Ulcinj. Vujačić retired as a player with Ulcinj in 2014.

== Coaching career ==
Following his retirement as a player in 2014, Ulcinj hired Vujačić as their new assistant coach. In 2015, he had briefly coached Albanian team Vllaznia prior he returned to Ulcinj as an assistant coach for the 2015–16 season. In 2016, Vujačić got promoted to head coach for Ulcinj. Afterwards, he had stints with Vllaznia and Goga Basket.

On 21 March 2022, Sutjeska hired Vujačić as their new head coach for the rest of the 2021–22 season. On 21 July 2022, he signed a one-year contract extension with Sutjeska.

== Career achievements ==
As player

- Montenegrin Cup winner: 1 (with Sutjeska: 2013)
- Romanian Cup winner: 1 (with CSU Pitești: 2012)

As head coach

- Albanian Basketball Superleague champion: 1 (with Vllaznia: 2014–15)
