= Janko Lukovski =

Macedonian basketball player (1946–2023)

Personal information
- Born: 7 April 1946 Skopje, PR Macedonia, FPR Yugoslavia
- Died: 6 November 2023 (aged 77) Novi Sad, Serbia
- Listed height: 1.95 m (6 ft 5 in)

Career information
- Playing career: 1962–1979
- Position: Shooting guard
- Coaching career: 1980–2000

Career history

Playing
- 1962–1976: Rabotnički
- 1976–1978: MZT Skopje
- 1978–1979: Rabotnički

Coaching
- 1980–1981: Borec Veles
- 1981–1982: Rabotnički
- 1982–1986: Yugoslavia U-21 (assistant)
- 1986–1988: Spartak Subotica
- 1988–1991: Egyseg Bačka Topola
- 1991–1992: Rabotnički
- 1992–1994: Profikolor
- 1994–1995: Vojvodina
- 1995–1996: Borovica
- 1996–1997: Vojvodina
- 1997–1998: MZT Skopje
- 1999–2000: Sutjeska

Janko Lukovski (Macedonian: Јанко Луковски; 7 April 1946 – 6 November 2023) was a Macedonian professional basketball player and coach who played for Rabotnički and MZT Skopje.

Lukovski died in Novi Sad on 6 November 2023, at the age of 77.
