= Vojkan Benčić =

Serbian basketball player

Scotts Lakers
- Title: Head Coach
- League: National League Division 1

Personal information
- Born: December 13, 1967 (age 58) Belgrade, SR Serbia, SFR Yugoslavia
- Listed height: 1.96 m (6 ft 5 in)

Career information
- NBA draft: 1989: undrafted
- Playing career: 1986–2004
- Position: Guard
- Number: 5, 7, 13
- Coaching career: 2004–present

Career history

Playing
- 1986–1987: Crvena zvezda
- 1987–1992: Spartak Subotica
- 1993–1994: Vojvodina
- 1994–1997: Beobanka
- 1997–1998: Crvena zvezda
- 1998–1999: Radnički Jugopetrol
- 1999: Azoty Unia Tarnóv
- 1999–2000: UMKS Kielce
- 2000: Kraški zidar
- 2000: Altay Izmir
- 2000–2002: Lokomotiv Mineralnye Vody
- 2002–2003: Yambol
- 2003: Atlas Belgrade
- 2003–2004: Spartak Subotica

Coaching
- 2004–2005: Spartak Subotica (assistant)
- 2005–2006: Spartak Subotica
- 2006–2007: Tamiš
- 2008–2013: Basket Plus Sombor
- 2013: Jagodina
- 2013–2014: Stade Nabeulien
- 2014: Jagodina
- 2017–present: Scotts Lakers

Vojkan Benčić (Serbian Cyrillic: Војкан Бенчић; born March 6, 1969) is a Serbian basketball coach and former player. He currently serves as a head coach for the Scotts Lakers of the Ireland National League Division 1.

== Playing career ==
Benčić played for the Crvena zvezda, Spartak, Vojvodina, Beobanka, and Radnički Jugopetrol of the Yugoslav League. During a stint with Beobanka he played the 1996–97 FIBA Korać Cup season. Over twelve cup games, he averaged 10.6 points, 2.6 rebounds and 3.8 assists per game. He won a national championship with Crvena zvezda in 1997–98 season. In same season with the Zvezda he played Korać Cup Finals where he lost from Italian team Riello Mash Verona. Over sixteen games in that Korać Cup season, he averaged 6.9 points, 2.6 rebounds and 1.7 assists per game. In next Korać Cup season he played for the Radnički Jugopetrol where he averaged 9.0 points, 4.0 rebounds and 3.3 assists per game over eight cup games.

In 1999, he went abroad. During next four years he played in Poland, Slovenia, Turkey, Russia and Bulgaria.

In 2003, he moved back to Belgrade where he played for the Atlas during 2003–04 ULEB Cup season. Over four cup games, he averaged 4.8 points, 2.8 rebounds and 3.3 assists per game. In December 2003, he parted ways with Atlas. Later he moved to the Spartak where he finished his professional career in the end of the 2003–04 season.

== Coaching career ==
After retirement, Benčić started his coaching career with the Spartak. He also coached Serbian teams Tamiš and Jagodina. During 2013–14 season, he coached the Stade Nabeulien of the Tunisian Division I League.

During summer of 2017 he signed with Killarney's team Scotts Lakers or the Ireland 2nd tier league.

== Career achievements and awards ==
As player

- FR Yugoslav League champion: 1 (with Crvena zvezda: 1997–98)
