= Amar Gegić =

Bosnian basketball player (born 1998)

No. 20 – Spartak Subotica
- Position: Small forward / shooting guard
- League: Serbian SuperLeague; ABA League; FIBA Champions League

Personal information
- Born: February 14, 1998 (age 28) Stuttgart, Germany
- Listed height: 2.00 m (6 ft 7 in)
- Listed weight: 89 kg (196 lb)

Career information
- NBA draft: 2020: undrafted
- Playing career: 2017–present

Career history
- 2017–2018: Bayern Munich
- 2018–2019: Partizan
- 2019–2020: Sloboda Tuzla
- 2020–2021: Spars Sarajevo
- 2021–2022: Cibona
- 2022–2023: Paris Basketball
- 2023: Metropolitans 92
- 2024: Gran Canaria
- 2024: Zadar
- 2025: Studentski centar
- 2026–present: Spartak Subotica

Career highlights
- Serbian League champion (2026); Serbian Cup winner (2019); Croatian League champion (2022); Croatian Cup winner (2022)

Amar Gegić (born February 14, 1998) is a Bosnian professional basketball player for Spartak Subotica of the Serbian SuperLeague, the ABA League, and the FIBA Champions League. He also represents the Bosnia and Herzegovina national team.

== Professional career ==
Gegić started his career with Spars Sarajevo, but Bayern Munich signed him when he was just 18 years old.

After two seasons with Bayern Munich, he joined Partizan in early August 2018, signing a three-year deal. During his time with the Partizan, he won the Radivoj Korać Cup in 2019. After one season, he parted ways with the club.

On August 10, 2019, Gegić signed with Sloboda Tuzla. In 2020, he returned to Spars Sarajevo, the club where he began his professional career. On June 6, 2021, Gegić signed with Cibona.

== Personal life ==
His surname is derived from Albanian ethnic subgroup of Ghegs.
