= Zlatko Bolić =

Serbian basketball player and executive

Personal information
- Born: 6 February 1974 (age 52) Novi Sad, SR Serbia, SFR Yugoslavia
- Listed height: 1.95 m (6 ft 5 in)

Career information
- NBA draft: 1996: undrafted
- Playing career: 1990–2009
- Position: Shooting guard
- Number: 10

Career history
- 1990–1996: Vojvodina
- 1996–2000: Crvena zvezda
- 2000–2002: NIS Vojvodina
- 2002–2003: Crvena zvezda
- 2003–2004: Strasbourg IG
- 2004–2005: Atlas Banka
- 2005–2006: Hemofarm
- 2006–2007: AEL Larissa
- 2007–2009: Radnički Invest Inženjering
- 2009: Metalac Valjevo
- 2009: Kecskeméti KSE

Career highlights
- YUBA League Top scorer (2002); Basketball League of Serbia Top scorer (2009); 2× YUBA League All-Star (1999, 2001)
Medals
Men's basketball
Representing FR Yugoslavia
'22 & under' European Championship
Bronze medal – third place	1996 Turkey	Team

Zlatko Bolić (Serbian Cyrillic: Златко Болић; born 6 February 1974) is a Serbian professional basketball executive and former player. He currently serves as the general secretary of the Basketball Federation of Serbia.

He was one of the best shooters of the YUBA League.

== Professional career ==
Bolić played with Vlade Divac, Igor Rakočević and Vladimir Radmanović in 1999, the same year that Crvena zvezda was in the Euroleague group stage.

== National team career ==
Bolić was a member of the Yugoslavia national cadet team at the 1991 European Championship for Cadets in Greece. Over seven tournament games, he averaged 18.0 points per game. He was the top scorer of Yugoslavia at the tournament.

Bolić was a member of the Yugoslavia national under-22 team (representing FR Yugoslavia) that won the bronze medal at the 1996 European Championship for Men 22 and Under in Turkey. Over seven tournament games, he averaged 4.1 points per game.

== Post-playing career ==
From 2011 to 2019, Bolić was a little league coach for a basketball club named after his children (Dunja and Luka).

On 26 November 2019, Bolić was appointed as a Secretary-General for the Basketball Federation of Serbia.

== See also ==
- List of KK Crvena zvezda players with 100 games played

Sporting positions
Preceded by Dejan Tomašević	Secretary General of the Basketball Federation of Serbia; 2019–present	Incumbent
