= Bogdan Bojić =

Montenegrin basketball player

Sutjeska
- Position: Small forward
- League: Montenegrin Basketball League

Personal information
- Born: 3 March 1999 (age 27) Nikšić, Montenegro, FR Yugoslavia
- Listed height: 1.93 m (6 ft 4 in)
- Listed weight: 85 kg (187 lb)

Career information
- NBA draft: 2021: undrafted
- Playing career: 2016–present

Career history
- 2016–2017: Sutjeska
- 2017–2019: Budućnost
- 2018–2019: →Studentski Centar
- 2019–2020: Sutjeska
- 2020–2021: Sloboda Tuzla
- 2021–present: Sutjeska

Career highlights
- ABA League champion (2018); Montenegrin Cup winner (2018)

Bogdan Bojić (born 3 March 1999) is a Montenegrin professional basketball player for Sutjeska of the Montenegrin Basketball League.

== Playing career ==
In July 2020, Bojić signed for a Bosnian team Sloboda Tuzla.
