= Winline Basket 2025–26 =

Eastern european basketball tournament

WINLINE Basket Cup (2025–26 season)
- Season: 2025–26
- Duration: October 2025 – April 2026
- Teams: 8
- Champions: PBC CSKA Moscow
- Runners-up: BC UNICS
- Third place: BC Parma
- Fourth place: BC Zenit Saint Petersburg
- Matches: 28
- Next season: 2026–27

This is a first edition of Winline Basket Cup. First game played on October 8, 2025.

The Winline Basketball Cup is available to watch for free via VK Video.

== Groups ==
=== Group A ===
In Group A, PBC CSKA Moscow, BC Parma, KK Mega Basket, and Lokomotiv Kuban competed.

The team gets 2 points for a win, and one point for a loss.

The final standings are as follows:

Position	Team	Played	Wins	Losses	Points scored	Points allowed	+/-	Points	Status
1st	(Russian Basketball Federation) PBC CSKA Moscow	6	5	1	544	470	+74	11	Final Four
2nd	(Russian Basketball Federation) BC Parma	6	4	2	519	517	+2	10	Final Four
3rd	(Basketball Federation of Serbia) KK Mega Basket	6	2	4	505	565	-60	8	Eliminated
4th	(Russian Basketball Federation) Lokomotiv Kuban	6	1	5	555	571	-16	7	Eliminated

=== Group B ===
In Group A, BC UNICS, BC Zenit Saint Petersburg, BC Uralmash Yekaterinburg, and KK Igokea competed.

The team gets 2 points for a win, and one point for a loss.

The final standings are as follows:

Position	Team	Played	Wins	Losses	Points scored	Points allowed	+/-	Points	Status
1st	(Russian Basketball Federation) BC Unics	6	4	2	519	465	+54	11	Final Four
2nd	(Russian Basketball Federation) BC Zenit Saint Petersburg	6	4	2	502	464	+38	10	Final Four
3rd	(Russian Basketball Federation) BC Uralmash Yekaterinburg	6	4	2	471	498	-27	10	Eliminated
4th	(Basketball Federation of Bosnia and Herzegovina) KK Igokea	6	0	6	476	541	-65	6	Eliminated

== Final Four ==
The Final Four was played at KSK Arena in Saint Petersburg, Russia. It took place from April 10, 2026, to April 12, 2026. A total of four games were played: two semi-finals, one third-place game, and one final.

The tournament bracket is shown below, with bold denoting the winners.

Semifinals; 10 April
(Russian Basketball Federation) PBC CSKA Moscow	88
**(Russian Basketball Federation) BC Zenit Saint Petersburg**	**74**
(Russian Basketball Federation) Unics Kazan	104
**(Russian Basketball Federation) BC Parma**	**83**

Finals; 12 April
(Russian Basketball Federation) PBC CSKA Moscow	73
**(Russian Basketball Federation) Unics Kazan**	**62**
Third place 11 April
(Russian Basketball Federation) BC Zenit Saint Petersburg	89
**(Russian Basketball Federation) BC Parma**	**95**

== Individual rewards ==
– (USA Basketball) Melo Trimble (PBC CSKA Moscow) takes home 2 awards: “Made the Difference” (best player on the winning team) and the fans’ MVP of tournament.

– (USA Basketball) Jalen Reynolds (UNICS Kazan) – First Option (tournament’s top scorer)

– (Russian Basketball Federation) Dmitry Kulagin (UNICS Kazan) – The Wall (best defensive player)

– (USA Basketball) Victor Sanders (BC Parma) – Sniper (most 3-pointers made)

– (Russian Basketball Federation) Andrei Martiuk (BC Zenit Saint Petersburg) – best moment of WINLINE Basket Cup Final Four.
