= ABA League system =

Basketball competition

The ABA League system or ABA/Adriatic League system pyramid is a series of interconnected competitions for men's professional basketball clubs in the Adriatic Basketball Association. The system has a hierarchical format with a promotion and demotion system between competitions at different levels.

The Adriatic Basketball Association comprises clubs from six countries in Southeast Europe, formerly Yugoslavia; Bosnia and Herzegovina, Croatia, Montenegro, North Macedonia, Serbia, and Slovenia.

== Competitions ==
There are currently two different competitions on the pyramid - the 1st-tier ABA League First Division, the 2nd-tier ABA League Second Division, which comprises the lower level, respective national 1st-tier competitions.

The ABA League First Division and the ABA League Second Division are organized by the ABA League JTD while the lower tier is organized by respective national federations.

=== The tier levels ===
Since the 2017–18 season, the ABA League system has been as follows:

Level	League					
1	First Division (14 teams)					
2	Second Division (14 teams)					
3	(Bosnia and Herzegovina); Championship (14 teams)	(Croatia); Premier League (12 teams)	(Montenegro); First A League (12 teams)	(North Macedonia); First League (10 teams)	(Serbia); First League (16 teams)	(Slovenia); Premier A League (10 teams)

=== Other competitions ===
- ABA Super Cup
- U19 ABA League Championship

== See also ==
- Serbian basketball league system
- European professional club basketball system
