= KK Spartak Subotica =

Basketball club in Subotica, Serbia

Spartak Office Shoes
- Leagues: Serbian SuperLeague; ABA League; Champions League
- Founded: 21 April 1945; 81 years ago
- History: KK Spartak; 1945–present
- Arena: Dudova Šuma Sports Hall
- Capacity: 2,000
- Location: Subotica, Serbia
- Team colors: Blue, White
- Head coach: Vlada Jovanović
- Team captain: Danilo Nikolić
- Affiliation: Women's team
- Championships: 1 Serbian SuperLeague; 1 ABA 2nd League
- Website: kkspartak.rs

Košarkaški klub Spartak (Serbian Cyrillic: Кошаркашки клуб Спартак), commonly referred to as Spartak Subotica or Spartak Office Shoes for sponsorship reasons, is a men's professional basketball club based in Subotica, Serbia. They are currently competing in the Serbian SuperLeague, the ABA League, and the FIBA Champions League.

== History ==
Former logo of Spartak

The club was founded in 1945 and was named after Jovan Mikić Spartak, an Olympic athlete from Subotica, who was killed in 1944.

After finishing at the 7th place in the canceled 2019–20 season of the Second League of Serbia (2nd-tier), the club failed to fulfill the League requirements and got relegated to the 4th-tier Second Regional League for the 2020–21 season.

In August 2021, the Basketball Federation of Serbia confirmed a disaffiliation of Fair Play and their merge into Spartak. The club took the Fair Play's spot for the 2021–22 Second Serbian League season.. While under the wing of coach Vlada Jovanović who arrived in 2023, the club won the ABA League Second Division in 2024 and achieved the biggest success in club history by winning the Serbian League in 2026.

== Sponsorship naming ==
The club has had several denominations through the years due to its sponsorship:

- Sinalco Spartak (2003–2007)
- Spartak Office Shoes (2021–present)

== Players ==
=== Current roster ===
Note: Flags indicate national team eligibility at FIBA-sanctioned events. Players may hold other non-FIBA nationalities not displayed.

Spartak Subotica roster
Players
Coaches

Pos.	No.	Nat.	Name	Ht.	Age
F/C	0	(United States)	Gaffney, Alonzo	2.07 m (6 ft 9 in)	26 – 28 January 2000
PG	2	(United States)	Coleman III, Matt	1.88 m (6 ft 2 in)	28 – 22 January 1998
PG	4	(Montenegro)	Drobnjak, Igor	1.93 m (6 ft 4 in)	26 – 21 April 2000
SG	5	(United States)	Pipkins, Jalon	1.92 m (6 ft 4 in)	27 – 30 November 1998
SG	6	(Serbia)	Jeremić, Marko	1.92 m (6 ft 4 in)	34 – 23 November 1991
F	9	(Serbia)	Lazarević, Stefan	2.00 m (6 ft 7 in)	30 – 20 August 1996
SG	12	(Serbia)	Tofoski, Marko	1.93 m (6 ft 4 in)	20 – 10 May 2006
SF	13	(Serbia)	Cerovina, Luka	2.01 m (6 ft 7 in)	26 – 8 April 2000
G/F	20	(Bosnia and Herzegovina)	Gegić, Amar	2.00 m (6 ft 7 in)	28 – 14 February 1998
F/C	22	(Serbia)	Ilić, Dalibor	2.06 m (6 ft 9 in)	26 – 4 March 2000
C	24	(Slovenia)	Omić, Alen	2.16 m (7 ft 1 in)	34 – 6 May 1992
C	33	(Serbia)	Bodrožić, Boris	2.11 m (6 ft 11 in)	22 – 24 September 2004
PF	34	(Montenegro)	Nikolić, Danilo (c)	2.06 m (6 ft 9 in)	33 – 8 April 1993
PF	35	(Montenegro)	Lacmanović, Danilo	2.05 m (6 ft 9 in)	22 – 18 February 2004

Head coach

- (Serbia) Vlada Jovanović

Assistant coach(es)

- (Serbia) Slobodan Ljubotina
- (Serbia) Đorđe Varagić

Legend

- (C) Team captain
- Injured

- Roster
Updated: September 25, 2026

=== Depth chart ===
Pos.	Starting 5	Bench 1	Bench 2
C	Alonzo Gaffney	Dalibor Ilić	Boris Bodrožić
PF	Danilo Nikolić	Stefan Lazarević	Danilo Lacmanović
SF	Amar Gegić	Luka Cerovina
SG	Jalon Pipkins	Marko Jeremić	Marko Tofoski
PG	Igor Drobnjak	Matt Coleman

== Coaches ==
- (Socialist Federal Republic of Yugoslavia) Janko Lukovski (1986–1988)
- (Socialist Federal Republic of Yugoslavia) Goran Miljković (1989–1993)
- (Federal Republic of Yugoslavia) Goran Mijović (1993–1994)
- (Federal Republic of Yugoslavia) Zoran Kovačević (1994)
- (Federal Republic of Yugoslavia) Rajko Toroman (1995–1997)
- (Federal Republic of Yugoslavia) Slobodan Lukić (1997)
- (Federal Republic of Yugoslavia) Srećko Sekulović (1997–2000)
- (Federal Republic of Yugoslavia) Radomir Kisić (2001–2002)
- (Federal Republic of Yugoslavia) Jovica Antonić (2002)
- (Federal Republic of Yugoslavia) Vojkan Benčić (2005–2006)
- (Serbia) Vuk Stanimirović
- (Serbia) Blagoja Ivić (2009–2010)
- (Serbia) Mihajlo Mitić (2012–2013)
- (Serbia) Predrag Borilović (2014–2015)
- (Serbia) Dušan Alimpijević (2015–2017)
- (North Macedonia) Aleksandar Jončevski (2017)
- (Serbia) Nenad Čanak (2017)
- (Serbia) Dragoljub Vidačić (2017–2018)
- (Serbia) Slobodan Ljubotina (2018–2019)
- (Serbia) Slobodan Bjelica (2019–2020)
- (Serbia) Blagoja Ivić (2020)
- (Serbia) Deni Katanić (2020–2021)
- (Serbia) Filip Socek (2021)
- (Serbia) Srećko Sekulović (2021–2022)
- (Serbia) Oliver Kostić (2022–2023)
- (Serbia) Željko Lukajić (2023)
- (Serbia) Vlada Jovanović (2023–present)

== Honours ==
=== Domestic competitions ===
==== League ====
- FR Yugoslav League (defunct)

Third place (1): 1992–93

- Serbian League

Winners (1): 2025–26
Runners up (1): 2024–25

- Second League of Serbia (2nd-tier)

Winner (1): 2021–22

==== Cup ====
- FR Yugoslavia Cup (defunct)

Runners-up (1): 1994–95

- League Cup of Serbia (2nd-tier)

Winner (1): 2022–23

=== Regional competitions ===
- ABA League Second Division

Winners (1): 2023–24

== Notable players ==
Note: Flags indicate national team eligibility at FIBA-sanctioned events. Players may hold other non-FIBA nationalities not displayed.

Criteria

To appear in this section a player must have either:

- Set a club record or won an individual award while at the club
- Played at least one official international match for their national team at any time
- Played at least one official NBA match at any time.

- (Serbia) Vojkan Benčić
- (Serbia) Nenad Čanak
- (Serbia) Branko Cvetković
- (Serbia) Vladimir Đokić
- (Serbia) Marko Jagodić-Kuridža
- (Serbia) Nikola Kalinić
- (Serbia) Dejan Koturović
- (Serbia) Dragan Lukovski
- (Serbia) Danilo Mijatović
- (Serbia) Oliver Popović
- (Serbia) Petar Popović
- (Hungary) Kemal Karahodžić
- (Democratic Republic of the Congo) Gracin Bakumanya
- (United States) Umoja Gibson
- (Serbia) Dušan Miletić

== International record ==
Season	Achievement	Notes
FIBA Saporta Cup
1995–96	Second round	Eliminated by Bnei Herzliya, 155–156 (1–1)
1992–93	Second round	Eliminated by Dinamo București, 0–4 (0–2)
FIBA Korać Cup
1996–97	Group stage	3rd in Group I with Telemarket Roma, Tofaş, and ZTE (3–3)
1997–98	Qualifying round	Eliminated by Cherno More, 168–186 (1–1)
1999–2000	Second round	Withdrew; Group M with Pinar Karşiyaka, Near East, and Slovan
FIBA Champions League
2024–25	Qualifying round	Eliminated by Juventus, 84–87 (0–1)
2025–26	Play-ins	Eliminated by Karditsa Iaponiki (0–2)
2026-27	Regural season
