= ABA League Second Division =

- Founded: July 2017; 9 years ago
- First season: 2017–18
- Country: Bosnia and Herzegovina; Croatia; Montenegro; North Macedonia; Serbia; Slovenia
- Confederation: FIBA Europe
- Number of teams: 15
- Level on pyramid: 2nd
- Promotion to: ABA League First Division
- Supercup: ABA Supercup
- International cup: Champions League
- Current champions: (Bosnia and Herzegovina) Široki TT Kabeli (1st title) (2025–26)
- Most championships: (Slovenia) Krka (2 titles)
- TV partners: Arena Sport
- Website: druga.aba-liga.com
- 2026–27 season

The ABA League Second Division, also ABA League 2, is the 2nd-tier men's basketball division of the ABA League system. It is run by the ABA League JTD. It is a regional competition between men's professional clubs from six countries: Bosnia and Herzegovina, Croatia, Montenegro, North Macedonia, Serbia, and Slovenia.

== History ==
The ABA League Assembly, held on 24 July 2017, in Belgrade, Serbia, decided to organize the ABA League Second Division with 12 participants. Based on the results in the national championships and by taking into account which clubs have sent applications for participation in the ABA League Second Division, these teams will play in the inaugural season of the ABA League Second Division.

Teams from Bosnia and Herzegovina, Croatia, Montenegro, North Macedonia, Serbia, and Slovenia previously played similar second-tier competition called First B Federal League when they were part of SFR Yugoslavia. The First B Federal League was played for 11 seasons from 1980 to 1991.

On 12 March 2020, the ABA League Assembly temporarily suspended the 2019–20 season due to the COVID-19 pandemic. On 27 May 2020, the ABA League Assembly canceled definitely the season due to the COVID-19 pandemic. On 29 June 2020, the Assembly decided to extend the number of clubs from 12 to 14 until the 2024–25 season. Further on 15 July 2024 Assembly changed competition format to number 16 teams divided into 4 groups of 4 teams each.

=== Seasons ===
Season	Champion	Runner-up	Top seed	Champion's Coach	Finals MVP
2017–18	(Slovenia) Krka	(Slovenia) Sixt Primorska	(Serbia) Borac Čačak	(Slovenia) Simon Petrov	(Bosnia and Herzegovina) Marko Jošilo
2018–19	(Slovenia) Sixt Primorska	(North Macedonia) MZT Skopje	(Slovenia) Sixt Primorska	(Slovenia) Goran Jagodnik	(Serbia) Marko Jagodić-Kuridža
2019–20	Cancelled due to the COVID-19 pandemic		(Serbia) Borac Čačak	None	Not awarded
2020–21	(Montenegro) Studentski centar	(Bosnia and Herzegovina) Spars	(Montenegro) Studentski centar	(Serbia) Nenad Trajković	(Serbia) Marko Tejić
2021–22	(Serbia) Zlatibor	(North Macedonia) MZT Skopje	(North Macedonia) MZT Skopje	(Serbia) Strajin Nedović	(Serbia) Dušan Kutlešić
2022–23	(Slovenia) Krka	(Slovenia) Helios Suns	(Slovenia) Helios Suns	(Slovenia) Jure Balažič	(Slovenia) Mate Vucić
2023–24	(Serbia) Spartak Office Shoes	(Serbia) Vojvodina MTS	(Serbia) Spartak Office Shoes	(Serbia) Vlada Jovanović	(Serbia) Filip Barna
2024–25	(Bosnia and Herzegovina) Bosna Visit Sarajevo	(Slovenia) Ilirija	None	(Bosnia and Herzegovina) Aleksandar Damjanović	(United States) Jarrod West
2025–26	(Bosnia and Herzegovina) Široki TT Kabeli	(North Macedonia) TFT Skopje	(Bosnia and Herzegovina) Široki TT Kabeli	(Croatia) Marijan Bagarić	(United States) D'Mitrik Trice
2026–27					

== First Division promotion and relegation ==
The champions of the Second Division are promoted to a following Adriatic League First Division season, while the last-placed team in the First Division are relegated to a following season of the Second Division. Also, as of the 2018–19 season, the 11th placed team of the ABA League First Division and the 2nd placed team of the Second Division, will play in the Qualifiers for a spot in the First Division for the following season.

Season	Promotion to First Division	Relegation from First Division
2016–17	None	(Slovenia) Krka (14)
2017–18	(Slovenia) Krka (1)	(North Macedonia) MZT Skopje Aerodrom (12)
2018–19	(Slovenia) Primorska (1)	(Slovenia) Petrol Olimpija (12)
2019–20	(Serbia) Borac Čačak; (Croatia) Split	None
2020–21	(Montenegro) Studentski centar (1)	(Slovenia) Koper Primorska
2021–22	(North Macedonia) MZT Skopje Aerodrom (Finalist)	(Slovenia) Krka (14)
2022–23	(Slovenia) Krka (Champion)	(North Macedonia) MZT Skopje Aerodrom (14)
2023–24	(Serbia) Spartak Office Shoes (Champion)	None
2024–25	(Bosnia and Herzegovina) Bosna Visit Sarajevo (Champion); (Slovenia) Ilirija (Runner-up)	(Croatia) Cibona (15); (Montenegro) Mornar Barsko zlato (16)

== Clubs (2025–26) ==
Location of teams in the 2025–26 season

Club	Home city	Arena	Capacity
(Basketball Federation of Bosnia and Herzegovina) Borac WWIN	Banja Luka	Borik Sports Hall	3,060
(Basketball Federation of Bosnia and Herzegovina) Jahorina	Pale	Sportska dvorana Peki	2,360
(Basketball Federation of Bosnia and Herzegovina) Široki TT Kabeli	Široki Brijeg	Pecara Sports Hall	4,500
(Basketball Federation of Bosnia and Herzegovina) Sloboda	Tuzla	SKPC Mejdan	4,900
(Basketball Federation of Bosnia and Herzegovina) Student m:tel	Banja Luka	SC Nenad Baštinac	2,500
(Basketball Federation of Montenegro) Mornar	Bar	Topolica Sport Hall	2,625
(Basketball Federation of Montenegro) Podgorica	Podgorica	Bemax Arena	2,000
(Basketball Federation of Montenegro) Primorje 1945	Herceg Novi	SC Igalo	2,000
(Basketball Federation of Montenegro) Sutjeska	Nikšić	Nikšić Sports Center	3,000
(Basketball Federation of North Macedonia) MZT Skopje Aerodrom	Skopje	Jane Sandanski	7,500
(Basketball Federation of North Macedonia) TFT Mozzart	Skopje	SRC Kale	2,250
(Basketball Federation of Serbia) SPD Radnički	Kragujevac	Jezero Hall	3,750
(Basketball Federation of Serbia) Vojvodina mts	Novi Sad	SPC Vojvodina	7,022
(Basketball Federation of Serbia) Vršac Meridianbet	Vršac	Millennium Centar	5,000
(Basketball Federation of Serbia) Zlatibor Mozzart	Čajetina	Čajetina Sports Hall	500
(Basketball Federation of Slovenia) Helios Suns	Domžale	Komunalni center Hall	2,500

== All-time participants ==
The following is a list of clubs that have played in the Second Division, at any time, since its formation in 2017, to the current season.

=== Key ===
1D	Played in the First Division
Cn.	Cancelled season
Defunct	Defunct teams
1st	Champions
2nd	Runners-up
SF	Semi-finalists
**Bold**	Teams playing in the 2025–26 season
^{R}	Regular season winners

=== List of participants ===
Note: Statistics are correct through the end of the 2025–26 season.

The 2019–20 season was cancelled due to COVID-19 pandemic in Europe.

Team	18	19	20	21	22	23	24	25	26	Total seasons	Best result
(Bosnia and Herzegovina) **Borac Banja Luka**	—	—	—	QF	SF	QF	9th	12th	9th	6	Semifinals
(Bosnia and Herzegovina) Bosna	11th	—	—	—	—	—	—	**1st**	1D	2	Champions
(Bosnia and Herzegovina) **Igokea**	1D								12th	1	12th
(Bosnia and Herzegovina) **Jahorina**	—	—	—	—	—	—	—	—	QF	1	Quarterfinals
(Bosnia and Herzegovina) **Sloboda Tuzla**	—	—	Cn.	—	—	—	—	—	QF	2	Quarterfinals
(Bosnia and Herzegovina) Spars	—	SF	Cn.	2nd	QF	12th	—	—	—	5	Runners-up
(Bosnia and Herzegovina) **Široki**	—	—	Cn.	9th	SF	SF	QF	QF	**1st**^{R}	7	Champions
(Bosnia and Herzegovina) Zrinjski	7th	9th	—	—	—	—	—	—	—	2	7th
(Croatia) Cedevita Junior	—	—	—	—	—	—	12th	QF	—	2	Quarterfinals
(Croatia) Gorica	—	—	—	10th	—	13th	—	—	—	2	10th
(Croatia) Split	8th	8th	Cn.	1D						3	8th
(Croatia) Šibenka	—	—	—	—	—	—	13th	15th	—	2	13th
(Croatia) Vrijednosnice Osijek	—	—	—	—	14th	14th	—	—	—	2	14th
(Montenegro) Lovćen 1947	6th	7th	Cn.	12th	13th	—	—	—	—	5	6th
(Montenegro) **Mornar Bar**	1D								14th	1	14th
(Montenegro) **Podgorica**	—	—	—	SF	10th	SF	SF	QF	15th	6	Semifinals
(Montenegro) **Primorje 1945**	—	—	—	—	—	—	—	—	11th	1	11th
(Montenegro) Studentski centar	—	—	—	**1st**^{R}	1D					1	Champions
(Montenegro) **Sutjeska**	—	6th	Cn.	13th	QF	QF	QF	11th	SF	8	Semifinals
(Montenegro) Teodo	9th	—	—	—	—	—	—	13th	—	2	9th
(North Macedonia) **MZT Skopje**	1D	2nd	Cn.	QF	2nd^{R}	1D	SF	10th	10th	7	Runners-up
(North Macedonia) AV Ohrid	12th	—	Defunct							1	12th
(North Macedonia) Pelister	—	—	—	—	11th	QF	10th	14th	—	4	Quarterfinals
(North Macedonia) Rabotnički	—	—	—	11th	—	—	—	16th	—	2	11th
(North Macedonia) **TFT Skopje**	—	—	—	—	—	11th	14th	—	2nd	3	Runners-up
(Serbia) Borac Čačak	SF^{R}	SF	Cn.	1D						3	Semifinals
(Serbia) Dynamic	10th	5th	Cn.	—	—	—	—	—	—	3	5th
(Serbia) Mladost Zemun	—	—	—	SF	QF	—	—	—	—	2	Semifinals
(Serbia) Novi Pazar	—	—	Cn.	—	—	—	—	—	—	1	—
(Serbia) **Radnički Kragujevac**	—	—	—	—	—	—	—	—	16th	1	16th
(Serbia) Sloboda Užice	—	—	—	QF	—	—	—	—	—	1	Quarterfinals
(Serbia) Sloga Kraljevo	—	—	—	—	—	9th	—	—	—	1	9th
(Serbia) Sombor	—	—	—	—	—	—	—	9th	—	1	9th
(Serbia) Spartak Subotica	—	—	—	—	—	—	**1st** ^{R}	1D		1	Champions
(Serbia) **Vojvodina**	—	—	—	—	9th	—	2nd	SF	QF	4	Runners-up
(Serbia) **Vršac**	SF	12th	—	—	—	—	—	—	13th	3	Semifinals
(Serbia) **Zlatibor**	—	—	—	QF	**1st**	QF	QF	SF	QF	6	Champions
(Slovenia) **Helios Suns**	—	11th	Cn.	14th	QF	2nd^{R}	QF	QF	SF	8	Runners-up
(Slovenia) Ilirija	—	—	—	—	—	—	—	2nd	1D	1	Runners-up
(Slovenia) Krka	**1st**	1D				**1st**	1D			2	Champions
(Slovenia) Primorska	2nd	**1st**^{R}	1D		Defunct					2	Champions
(Slovenia) Rogaška	5th	10th	Cn.	—	12th	—	—	—	—	4	5th
(Slovenia) Šenčur	—	—	—	—	—	10th	11th	—	—	2	10th

== See also ==
- Yugoslav First B Federal League
- ABA League Supercup

== Notes ==
1. Olimpija Ljubljana and Cedevita Zagreb made a merger and established a new club based in Ljubljana in July 2019 under the name Cedevita Olimpija.
2. Borac Čačak and Split were awarded with wild cards to participate in the 2020–21 ABA League First Division.
3. Koper Primorska was disqualified from the ABA League in December 2020 after failing to play two consecutive games due to financial problems. Later that month, the club also withdrew from the Slovenian League and was disbanded.
