= Basketball League of Serbia =

Serbian sports league

- Founded: 2006; 20 years ago
- First season: 2006–07
- Country: Serbia
- Confederation: FIBA Europe
- Number of teams: 22
- Level on pyramid: 1st
- Feeder to: Adriatic Second League
- Relegation to: Second League
- Domestic cup(s): Radivoj Korać Cup; Cup of Serbia
- Current champions: Spartak (1st title) (2025–26)
- Most championships: Partizan; Crvena zvezda (9 titles each)
- CEO: Aleksandar Grujin
- Commissioner: Darko Jovičić
- TV partners: RTS; Arena Sport
- Website: kls.rs
- 2026–27 BLS season

The Basketball League of Serbia (Serbian: Кошаркашка лига Србије, romanized: Košarkaška liga Srbije), commonly abbreviated as KLS, is a top-tier men's professional basketball league in Serbia. Founded in 2006. It is currently not run by the Basketball Federation of Serbia (KSS).

== Rules ==
=== Competition format ===
The league, operated by the Basketball Federation of Serbia, consists of two stages: the First League which has 16 teams and the SuperLeague which has 8 teams.

Since the 2017–18 season, the top 2 teams in First League are promoted to Super League with 6 Serbian teams from the ABA League. Two lowest-placed teams, positioned 15th and 16th in the First League, are relegated to a lower-tier league – Second Basketball League of Serbia. Teams positioned 1st and 2nd in First League will be qualified for the next season's ABA League Second Division. The SuperLeague has 8 clubs divided into 2 groups of 4 teams. The best 4 clubs (top 2 teams from groups A and B each) in the SuperLeague go to the Playoff stage.

The following is the access list for current season:

Access list for the 2025–26 Serbian League
	Teams entering in this round	Teams advancing from the previous round
First League (16 teams)	14 highest-placed teams from the last season; 2 highest-placed teams from the Second League	
Super League (8 teams)	6 Adriatic League teams	2 highest-placed teams from the First League
Playoffs (4 teams)		2 group winners from the Super League; 2 group runners-ups from the Super League

=== Arena standards ===
Currently, clubs must have home arenas with a capacity of a minimum of 1,000 seats.

== History ==
=== Sponsorship naming ===
The League has had several denominations through the years due to its sponsorship:

- Sinalco Basketball League of Serbia: 2006–2007
- Swisslion Basketball League of Serbia: 2007–2009
- Agroživ Basketball League of Serbia: 2011–2013
- Mozzart Basketball League of Serbia: 2016–2019
- Admiral Bet Basketball League of Serbia: 2021–2025
- Meridianbet Basketball League of Serbia: 2025–present

=== Champions ===
- 2006–07: Partizan
- 2007–08: Partizan Igokea
- 2008–09: Partizan Igokea
- 2009–10: Partizan
- 2010–11: Partizan
- 2011–12: Partizan mt:s
- 2012–13: Partizan mt:s
- 2013–14: Partizan
- 2014–15: Crvena zvezda Telekom
- 2015–16: Crvena zvezda Telekom
- 2016–17: Crvena zvezda mts
- 2017–18: Crvena zvezda mts
- 2018–19: Crvena zvezda mts
- 2019–20: Cancelled due to COVID-19
- 2020–21: Crvena zvezda mts
- 2021–22: Crvena zvezda mts
- 2022–23: Crvena zvezda Meridianbet
- 2023–24: Crvena zvezda Meridianbet
- 2024–25: Partizan Mozzart Bet
- 2025–26: Spartak Subotica

==== Titles by club ====
Club	Champions	Winning years	Runner-up
Crvena zvezda	9	2014–15, 2015–16, 2016–17, 2017–18, 2018–19, 2020–21, 2021–22, 2022–23, 2023–24	5
Partizan	9	2006–07, 2007–08, 2008–09, 2009–10, 2010–11, 2011–12, 2012–13, 2013–14, 2024–25	4
Spartak Subotica	1	2025–26	1
FMP	0		5
Vršac	0		3
Mega	0		1

=== League commissioners ===
- 2006–2011: Tihomir Bubalo
- 2011–2013: Predrag Bojić
- 2013–present: Darko Jovičić

=== League CEOs ===
- 2006–2014: Dragan Gogić
- 2014–2021: Leon Deleon
- 2021–present: Aleksandar Grujin

== Current teams ==
Location of clubs in the 2026–27 season

Team	Home city	Arena
Borac Čačak	Čačak	Borac Hall
Borac Zemun	Zemun	Pinki Hall
Čačak 94	Čačak	SC Mladost
Crvena zvezda	Belgrade	Aleksandar Nikolić Hall
Dynamic	Belgrade	Dynamic Arena
FMP	Železnik	Železnik Hall
Hercegovac	Gajdobra	Gajdobra Sports Hall
Kolubara	Lazarevac	Kolubara Sports Center
Mega	Belgrade	Ranko Žeravica Sports Hall
Metalac	Valjevo	Valjevo Sports Hall
Mladost	Zemun	Master Sports Center
Niš	Niš	Čair Sports Center
OKK Beograd	Belgrade	Dejan Milojević Training Center
Partizan	Belgrade	Belgrade Arena
Radnički Belgrade	Belgrade	David Kalinić Sports Hall
Radnički Kragujevac	Kragujevac	Jezero Hall
Sloboda	Užice	Veliki Park Hall
Sloga	Kraljevo	Kraljevo Sports Hall
Spartak	Subotica	Dudova Šuma Sports Hall
Tamiš	Pančevo	Strelište Sports Hall
Vojvodina	Novi Sad	SPC Vojvodina
Zlatibor	Čajetina	Čajetina Sports Hall

Clubs in the 2026–27 ABA League First Division
Clubs in the 2026–27 ABA League Second Division

== Standings ==
=== First League ===
Season	Clubs	Top seeder (Rc)	Runner-up (Rc)
2006–07	12	Vojvodina Srbijagas (21–1)	Sloga (14–8)
2007–08	12	Swisslion Takovo (17–5)	Vizura (14–8)
2008–09	14	Swisslion Takovo (22–4)	Borac Čačak (17–5)
2009–10	14	Borac Čačak (20–6)	Tamiš (19–7)
2010–11	14	FMP Železnik (22–4)	OKK Beograd (19–7)
2011–12	14	Vojvodina Srbijagas (23–3)	Radnički Beograd (19–7)
2012–13	14	Vojvodina Srbijagas (20–6)	Mega Basket (20–6)
2013–14	14	FMP (20–6)	Crnokosa (18–8)
2014–15	12	FMP (19–3)	Konstantin (17–7)
2015–16	12	FMP (24–2)	Borac Čačak (18–8)
2016–17	14	Vršac (22–4)	Borac Čačak (20–6)
2017–18	14	Borac Čačak (20–6)	Dynamic BG (19–7)
2018–19	14	Borac Čačak (22–4)	Novi Pazar (20–6)
2019–20	14	Borac Čačak (23–3)	Sloboda (20–6)
2020–21	16	Mladost Zemun (28–2)	Vojvodina (26–4)
2021–22	16	Zlatibor (22–8)	Sloga (20–10)
2022–23	16	Zlatibor (22–8)	Spartak (22–8)
2023–24	16	Vojvodina (26–4)	Spartak (24–6)
2024–25	16	Vršac Meridianbet (25–5)	Zlatibor Mozzart (21–9)
2025–26	16	Zlatibor Mozzart (27–3)	Sloboda (22–8)

=== SuperLeague Play-off finals ===
Season	Champions	Result	Runners-up	SuperLeague top seeders	Record
2006–07	Partizan (14)	3–1	Crvena zvezda	Hemofarm	12–2
2007–08	Partizan Igokea (15)	3–1	Hemofarm	Partizan Igokea	12–2
2008–09	Partizan Igokea (16)	3–2	Crvena zvezda	Partizan Igokea	6–0
2009–10	Partizan (17)	3–0	Hemofarm	Partizan	13–1
2010–11	Partizan (18)	3–0	Hemofarm	Partizan	13–1
2011–12	Partizan mt:s (19)	3–1	Crvena zvezda	Partizan mt:s	12–2
2012–13	Partizan mt:s (20)	3–1	Crvena zvezda	Partizan mt:s	12–2
2013–14	Partizan (21)	3–1	Crvena zvezda Telekom	Partizan	13–1
2014–15	Crvena zvezda Telekom (16)	3–0	Partizan NIS	Crvena zvezda Telekom	13–1
2015–16	Crvena zvezda Telekom (17)	3–1	Partizan NIS	Crvena zvezda Telekom	6–0
2016–17	Crvena zvezda mts (18)	3–0	FMP	Crvena zvezda mts	13–1
2017–18	Crvena zvezda mts (19)	3–0	FMP	FMP	9–1
2018–19	Crvena zvezda mts (20)	3–1	Partizan NIS	Crvena zvezda mts / Partizan NIS	10–0
2019–20	Canceled due to the COVID-19 pandemic				
2020–21	Crvena zvezda mts (21)	2–1	Mega Soccerbet	Not held	—
2021–22	Crvena zvezda mts (22)	2–0	FMP Meridian	Not held	—
2022–23	Crvena zvezda Meridianbet (23)	2–0	FMP Soccerbet	Not held	—
2023–24	Crvena zvezda Meridianbet (24)	2–0	Partizan Mozzart Bet	Not held	—
2024–25	Partizan Mozzart Bet (22)	2–0	Spartak Office Shoes	Not held	—
2025–26	Spartak Office Shoes	76–73	FMP	Not held	—

== All–time national champions ==
Total number of national champions won by Serbian clubs. Table includes titles won during the Yugoslav First Federal League (1946–1992) and First League of Serbia and Montenegro (1992–2006) as well.

Club	Champions	Winning years	Runner-up
Crvena zvezda	24	1946, 1947, 1948, 1949, 1950, 1951, 1952, 1953, 1954, 1955, 1969, 1972, 1993, 1994, 1998, 2015, 2016, 2017, 2018, 2019, 2021, 2022, 2023, 2024	15
Partizan	22	1976, 1979, 1981, 1987, 1992, 1995, 1996, 1997, 2002, 2003, 2004, 2005, 2006, 2007, 2008, 2009, 2010, 2011, 2012, 2013, 2014, 2025	18
OKK Beograd	4	1958, 1960, 1963, 1964	1
Proleter Zrenjanin	1	1956	4
Spartak Subotica	1	2026	1
Radnički Belgrade	1	1973	–
FMP	–		8
Vršac	–		5
Mega	–		1
Borovica Ruma	–		1
BFC Beočin	–		1

== Statistical leaders ==
=== Points ===
Season	Player	Team	PPG
2006–07	(Serbia) Miloš Bojović	Sloga	21.9
2007–08	(Serbia) Zoran Erceg	FMP Železnik	18.1
2008–09	(Serbia) Zlatko Bolić	Radnički Invest	22.8
2009–10	(Serbia) Miroslav Raduljica	FMP Železnik	21.1
2010–11	(Serbia) Branko Milisavljević	Mega Vizura	20.5
2011–12	(Serbia) Miloš Bojović (2)	Železničar	23.5
2012–13	(Bosnia and Herzegovina) Marko Popović	Sloga	18.6
2013–14	(Montenegro) Bojan Bakić	Metalac	18.4
2014–15	(Serbia) Miloš Dimić	Vršac Swisslion	21.6
2015–16	(Serbia) Aleksa Avramović	Borac Čačak	20.7
2016–17	(Serbia) Brano Đukanović	Metalac Valjevo	21.6
2017–18	(United States) Orlando Coleman	Radnički	22.47
2018–19	(Serbia) Đorđe Dželetović	Vojvodina	24.00
2019–20	(Serbia) Andrija Simović	Zlatibor	19.57
2020–21	(Serbia) Andreja Stevanović	Radnički	23.32
2021–22	(Serbia) Andrija Bojić	KK Mladost	20.4
2022–23	(Canada) Stefan Smith	KK Kolubara	22.8
2023–24	(Serbia) Sava Lešić	KK Metalac Valjevo	22.0
2024–25	(United States) Trevor Moore	KK Tamiš	22.1

=== Rebounds ===
Season	Player	Team	RPG
2006–07	(United States) Kebu Stewart	Crvena zvezda	6.2
2007–08	(Serbia) Nikola Ilić	Borac Čačak	4.8
2008–09	(Serbia) Uroš Mirković	Mašinac	8.5
2009–10	(Serbia) Miroslav Raduljica	FMP Železnik	8.6
2010–11	(Serbia) Sava Lešić	Crvena zvezda	10.9
2011–12	(Serbia) Darko Balaban	Smederevo 1953	8.8
2012–13	(Serbia) Boban Marjanović	Mega Vizura	11.7
2013–14	(Serbia) Novica Veličković	Mega Vizura	8.3
2014–15	(Serbia) Nikola Jokić	Mega Leks	10.4
2015–16	(Serbia) Stefan Fundić	Beovuk 72	10.3
2016–17	(Serbia) Stefan Fundić (2)	Beovuk 72	11.8
2017–18	(Serbia) Lazar Zorčić	Dunav	7.74
2018–19	(Serbia) Milenko Veljković	OKK Beograd	10.57
2019–20	(Serbia) Aleksandar Vuletić	Kolubara	9.46
2020–21	(Serbia) Đorđe Simeunović	Napredak Aleksinac	10.8

=== Assists ===
Season	Player	Team	APG
2006–07	(Serbia) Miloš Teodosić	FMP Železnik	5.4
2007–08	(United States) Omar Cook	Crvena zvezda	7.3
2008–09	(Serbia) Bojan Jovičić	Tamiš	6.3
2009–10	(Serbia) Vid Žarković	Proleter Zrenjanin	7.2
2010–11	(Serbia) Marko Ljubičić	Metalac Valjevo	6.4
2011–12	(Serbia) Miljan Pavković	Radnički Kragujevac	6.9
2012–13	(Bosnia and Herzegovina) Marko Popović	Sloga Kraljevo	8.1
2013–14	(Serbia) Marko Marinović	Radnički Kragujevac	8.1
2014–15	(Serbia) Saša Đorđević	MBK Handlová	6.5
2015–16	(Serbia) Filip Čović	FMP	6.5
2016–17	(Serbia) Filip Čović (2)	FMP	6.0
2017–18	(Serbia) Vuk Malidžan	Mladost	7.24
2018–19	(Serbia) Aleksandar Vasić	Metalac	8.27
2019–20	(Serbia) Svetozar Popović	Borac	9.45
2020–21	(Turkey) Mert Akay	Dynamic	9.63

Source:eurobasket.com

=== Players with most topscorer awards ===
Player	Wins	Years
(Serbia) Miloš Bojović	2	2007, 2012
(Serbia) Zlatko Bolić	2	2002, 2009
(Serbia) Branko Milisavljević	2	2000, 2011

== Serbian basketball clubs in European and regional competitions ==
EuroLeague

Club	Winner	Years
Partizan	1	1992

FIBA Saporta Cup

Club	Winner	Years
Crvena zvezda	1	1974

FIBA Korać Cup

Club	Winner	Years
Partizan	3	1978, 1979, 1989

ABA League

Club	Winner	Years
Partizan	8	2007, 2008, 2009, 2010, 2011, 2013, 2023, 2025
Crvena zvezda	7	2015, 2016, 2017, 2019, 2021, 2022, 2024
FMP	2	2004, 2006
Vršac	1	2005

== Awards ==
- BLS First League MVP
- BLS Super League MVP
- BLS Playoff MVP

== Notable players ==
- (Serbia) Nemanja Aleksandrov
- (Serbia) Stefan Birčević
- (Serbia) Nemanja Bjelica
- (Serbia) Bogdan Bogdanović
- (Serbia) Luka Bogdanović
- (Serbia) Zlatko Bolić
- (Serbia) Branko Cvetković
- (Serbia) Marko Čakarević
- (Serbia) Tadija Dragićević
- (Serbia) Zoran Erceg
- (Serbia) Marko Gudurić
- (Serbia) Milan Gurović
- (Serbia) Nikola Jokić
- (Serbia) Stefan Jović
- (Serbia) Nikola Kalinić
- (Serbia) Raško Katić
- (Serbia) Dušan Kecman
- (Serbia) Marko Kešelj
- (Serbia) Ognjen Kuzmić
- (Serbia) Dragan Labović
- (Serbia) Branko Lazić
- (Serbia) Vladimir Lučić
- (Serbia) Milan Mačvan
- (Serbia) Marko Marinović
- (Serbia) Boban Marjanović
- (Serbia) Stefan Marković
- (Serbia) Branko Milisavljević
- (Serbia) Dragan Milosavljević
- (Serbia) Nemanja Nedović
- (Serbia) Ivan Paunić
- (Serbia) Kosta Perović
- (Serbia) Vuk Radivojević
- (Serbia) Miroslav Raduljica
- (Serbia) Igor Rakočević
- (Serbia) Milovan Raković
- (Serbia) Aleksandar Rašić
- (Serbia) Boris Savović
- (Serbia) Marko Simonović
- (Serbia) Miloš Teodosić
- (Serbia) Milenko Tepić
- (Serbia) Milenko Topić
- (Serbia) Uroš Tripković
- (Serbia) Novica Veličković
- (Serbia) Čedomir Vitkovac
- (Serbia) Rade Zagorac
- (Australia) Jonah Bolden
- (Australia) Nathan Jawai
- (Australia) Aleks Marić
- (Australia) Steven Marković
- (Bosnia and Herzegovina) Ratko Varda
- (Belize) Milt Palacio
- (Bulgaria) Filip Videnov
- (Croatia) Ivica Zubac
- (Czech Republic) Jan Veselý
- (Finland) Jamar Wilson
- (France) Joffrey Lauvergne
- (France) Timothé Luwawu-Cabarrot
- (France) Léo Westermann
- (Gabon) Stéphane Lasme
- (Germany) Maik Zirbes
- (Guyana) Rawle Marshall
- (Hungary) István Németh
- (Latvia) Dāvis Bertāns
- (New Zealand) Corey Webster
- (North Macedonia) (United States) Bo McCalebb
- (North Macedonia) Pero Antić
- (North Macedonia) Predrag Samardžiski
- (Montenegro) (United States) Omar Cook
- (Montenegro) Vladimir Dašić
- (Montenegro) Predrag Drobnjak
- (Montenegro) Aleksandar Pavlović
- (Montenegro) Nikola Peković
- (Montenegro) Slavko Vraneš
- (Slovenia) Jaka Blažič
- (Slovenia) Goran Jagodnik
- (Slovenia) Edo Murić
- (Turkey) (Serbia) Duşan Çantekin
- (Turkey) (Bosnia and Herzegovina) Semih Erden
- (United States) Vonteego Cummings
- (United States) James Gist
- (United States) Dominic James
- (United States) Charles Jenkins
- (United States) Curtis Jerrells
- (United States) Michael Lee
- (United States) Quincy Miller
- (United States) DeMarcus Nelson
- (United States) Lawrence Roberts
- (United States) Michael Scott
- (United States) David Simon
- (United States) Omar Thomas
- (Germany) Duane Washington
- (United States) Nate Wolters
- (United States) Terrico White
- (United States) Marcus Williams

== See also ==
- Radivoj Korać Cup
- Basketball Federation of Serbia
- Serbia national basketball team
- YUBA League
- Yugoslav Basketball League
