= KK Sutjeska =

Men's professional basketball club in Montenegro

- Nickname: Plavi
- Leagues: Montenegrin League; ABA League
- Founded: 1948; 78 years ago
- History: List: KK Sutjeska (1948–1955) KK Nikšić (1955–1957) KK Partizan (1957–1962) KK Mladost (1962–1966) KK Sutjeska (1966–1970) KK Partizan (1970–1974) KK Sutjeska (1974–2003) KK Nikšić (2003–2010) KK Sutjeska (2010–present)
- Arena: Nikšić Sports Center
- Capacity: 3,000
- Location: Nikšić, Montenegro
- Team colors: Blue and White
- President: Saša Miličić
- General manager: Zoran Marojević
- Head coach: Dragan Nikolić
- Championships: 1 Montenegrin Cup
Home	Away

KK Sutjeska is a men's professional basketball club based in Nikšić, Montenegro. The team currently competes in Montenegrin Basketball League and regional ABA League. The club won the Montenegrin Cup in 2014.

== History ==
KK Sutjeska was established in 1948. The first basic basketball elements given to the youth of Nikšić were brought by Vojislav Spasojević, a basketball coach from Belgrade. Immediately after the initiative was taken, Vule Vukalović joined the team's administrative team along with the help of international referee Dragan Jakšić—and a serious basketball team began to take form.

The first competition in which KK Sutjeska participated in was in 1950, in a Montenegro-wide championship held in Cetinje, where Sutjeska beat Jedinstvo 24–20.

In 1955, KK Sutjeska changed its name to KK Nikšić. The name didn't last long—in 1957 the name was changed yet again, this time to KK Partizan Nikšić. In 1962 the name was changed to KK Mladost. That year in the regional championship of Montenegro, six teams competed and in the end, it was actually KK Mladost who became champions—without a single lost match. The players that represented KK Mladost in 1962 included names such as Burić, Plamenac, Gvozdenović, Šturanović, Krstajić, Jovović, Zeković, Mijatović, Baletić, Filipovski, Vušurović and Nikolić.

In 1966 KK Mladost changed its name back to KK Sutjeska, but in 1970 the name was changed again to KK Partizan. Finally, in 1974, the team changed its name from Partizan to KK Sutjeska without taking away the Sutjeska name until 2003, when the club was known under a couple of names up until 2010. In 2010 the club was registered back to the traditional name of KK Sutjeska.

On February 9, 2013, in the final match of the Montenegrin Basketball Cup, KK Sutjeska beat long-time rivals KK Budućnost Podgorica, 64–55. It was the first time, since Montenegro independence in 2006, that KK Budućnost failed to win.

On September 10, 2015, Sutjeska was admitted in the 2015–16 ABA League. It was their first Regional competition.

== Players ==
=== Current roster ===
Note: Flags indicate national team eligibility at FIBA-sanctioned events. Players may hold other non-FIBA nationalities not displayed.

KK Sutjeska roster
Players
Coaches

Pos.	No.	Nat.	Name	Ht.	Age
PG	1	(Bosnia and Herzegovina)	Zahiragić, Adi	1.87 m (6 ft 2 in)	31 – 24 February 1995
PG	4	(Bosnia and Herzegovina)	Milović, Vasilije	1.88 m (6 ft 2 in)	24 – 11 May 2001
G	5	(Montenegro)	Varajić, Ilija	1.96 m (6 ft 5 in)	23 – 18 June 2002
C	9	(Serbia)	Koprivica, Miloš	2.08 m (6 ft 10 in)	30 – 24 March 1995
SF	10	(Montenegro)	Ćalić, Marko	1.96 m (6 ft 5 in)	40 – 28 February 1986
C	11	(Montenegro)	Vujović, Miloš	2.06 m (6 ft 9 in)	30 – 16 January 1996
SF	12	(Montenegro)	Bojić, Bogdan	2.01 m (6 ft 7 in)	27 – 3 March 1999
SG	13	(Montenegro)	Vuković, Radoš	1.98 m (6 ft 6 in)	24 – 7 February 2002
PF	14	(Montenegro)	Spasojević, Radosav	2.04 m (6 ft 8 in)	34 – 28 February 1992
SF	15	(Montenegro)	Tomašević, Vladimir	2.01 m (6 ft 7 in)	35 – 13 January 1991
C	17	(Montenegro)	Vujošević, Radoje	2.08 m (6 ft 10 in)	36 – 5 May 1989
G/F	23	(Montenegro)	Gutović, Ognjen	2.00 m (6 ft 7 in)	24 – 23 November 2001

Head coach

- (Montenegro) Darko Vujačić

Legend

- (C) Team captain
- Injured

- Roster
Updated: March 22, 2022

== Supporters and rivalries ==
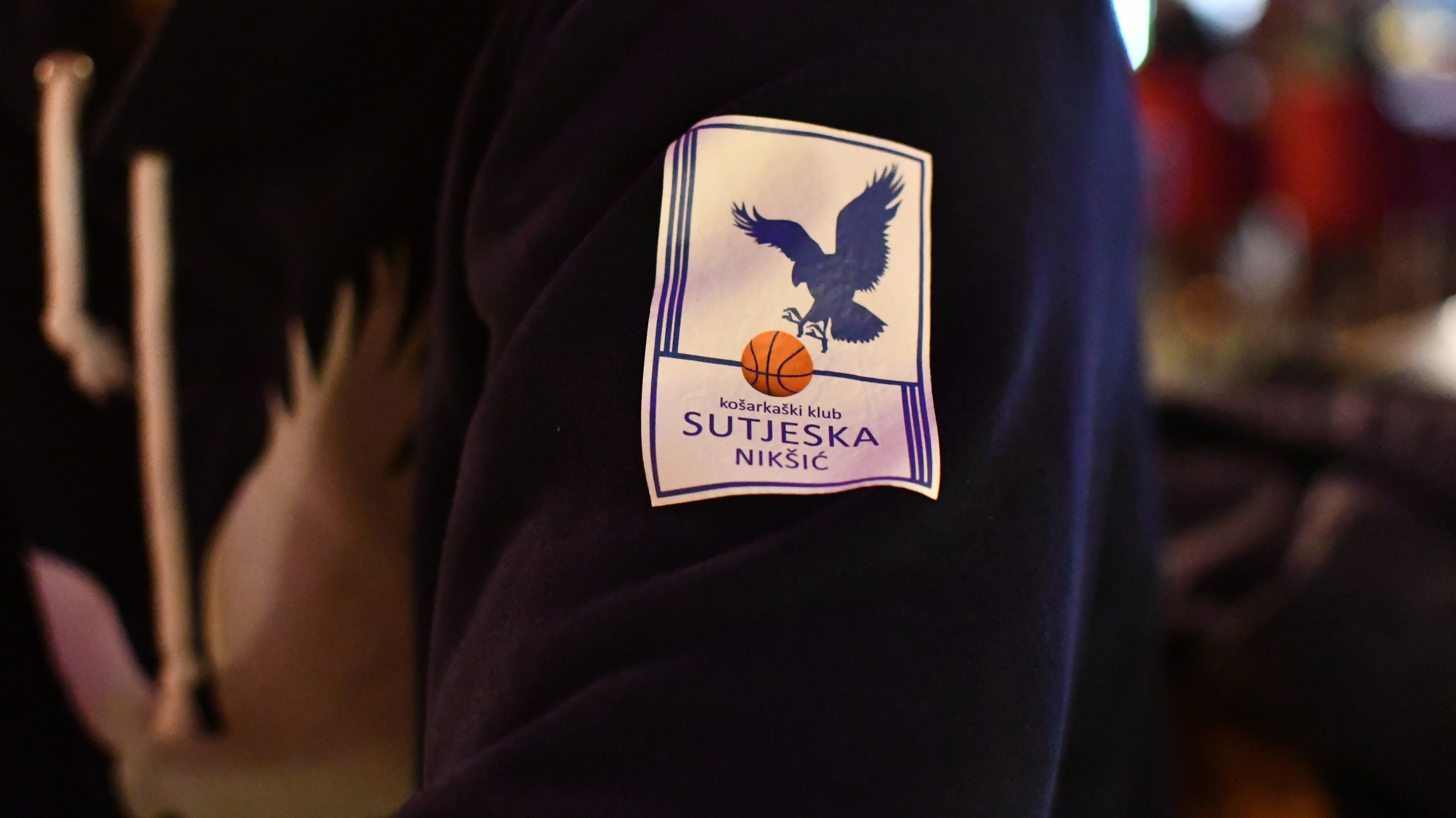
KK Sutjeska apparel in February 2022.

"The Dukes" (Vojvode) is the popular name for fervent Sutjeska fans. They were established in Nikšić as an NGO in 1988 and are one of the largest groups of supporters in Montenegro. They tend to follow all sports teams that compete under the “Sutjeska” name, home and away matches.

The biggest Sutjeska rival is KK Budućnost Podgorica, as the "Barbarians" (Varvari) are the other large group of supporters in the country.

== See also ==
- RK Sutjeska
- FK Sutjeska Nikšić
