= KK TFT =

- Leagues: Macedonian League
- Founded: 2018; 8 years ago
- Arena: Forza Sport Center; SRC Kale
- Location: Skopje, North Macedonia
- Team colors: Black and White
- President: Boro Smilkovski
- Head coach: Boro Smilkovski
- Championships: 1 Macedonian Cup
Home	Away

KK TFT (Macedonian: КК ТФТ), also known as TFT Skopje, is a basketball club based in Skopje, North Macedonia. They play in the Macedonian First League from the season 2020–21.

== History ==
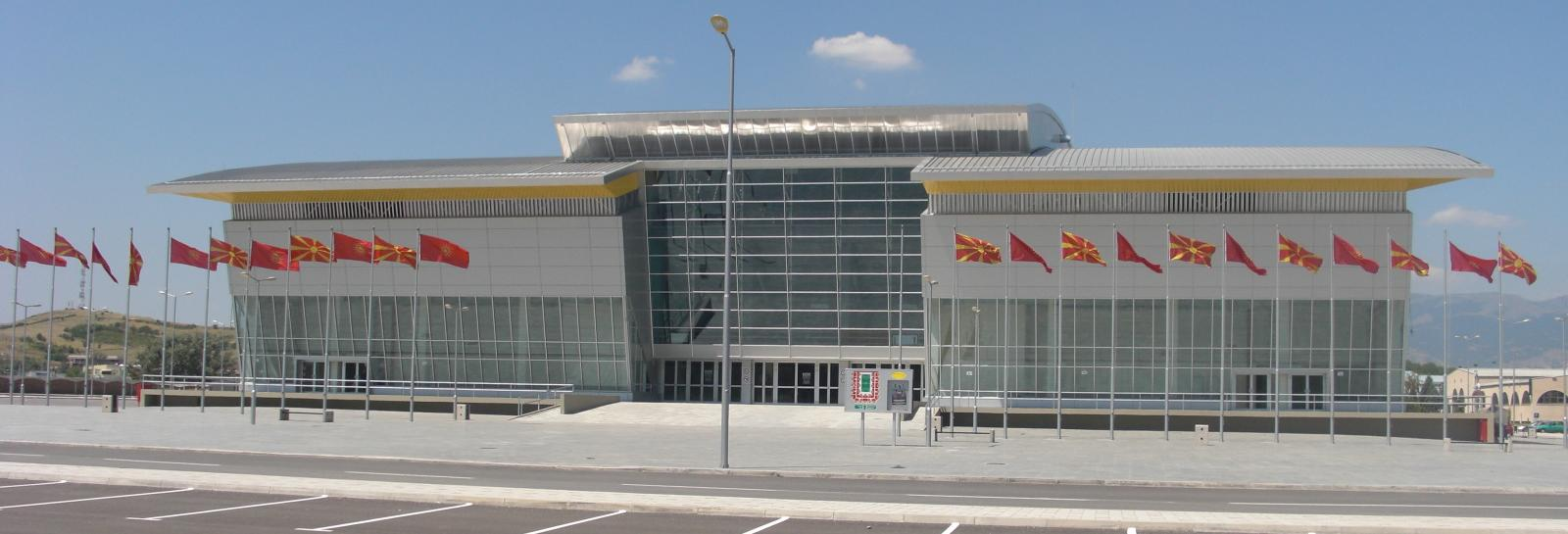
BTSC

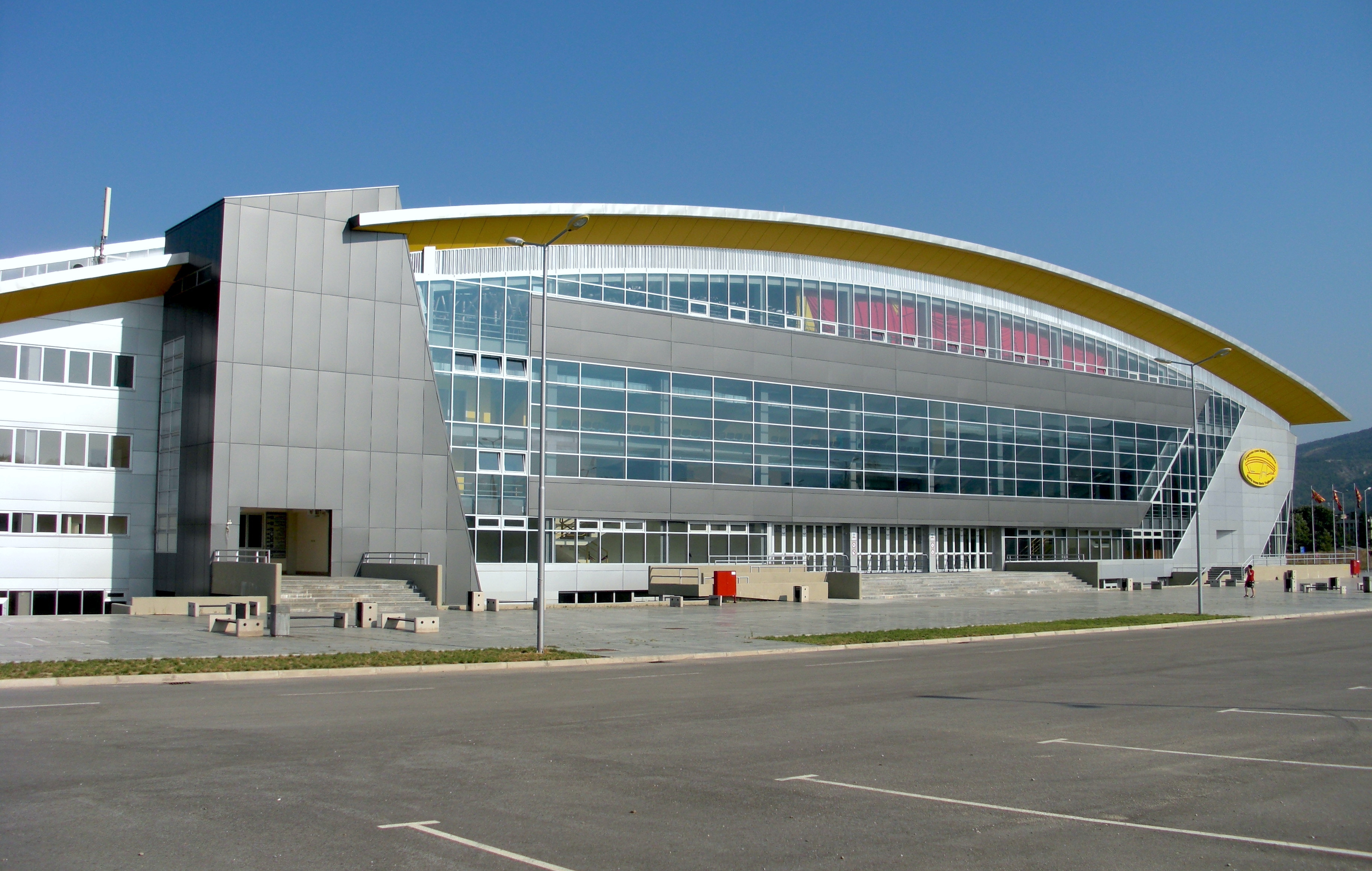
BTSC

KK TFT was founded in 2018 in Skopje by a group of enthusiasts from Taftalidže settlement of the Skopje's Karpoš Municipality. In the first two seasons, the club took part in Skopje's Second League. In the season 2018–19, the team finished at fourth place in the regular season and were eliminated in the Round of 16. Next season, they were placed at first place when the season was suspended because of the COVID-19 pandemic and the Basketball Federation has decided to promote them to Macedonian First League.

- From season 2020 the club entered Delasport BIBL League.

In their first season they've finished sixth winning four games . In the season 2022 they've finished 8th winning 5 games. They got back in the Delasport BIBL league in the season 2024. In the 2021–22 season, TFT entered the qualifying rounds of the FIBA Europe Cup, marking the club's debut in Europe.

FIBA CHAMPIONS LEAGUE

After the successful entering to the FIBA Europe Cup previous season TFT Skopje was the organizer of the pool A qualifiers for the Champions League. The venue was Trajkovski Arena in Skopje . The Host TFT Skopje was playing against top European teams: Leicester Riders, Voluntari, Niners Chemnitz, Tofaş and Fribourg Olympic for the spot in the Champions league in the season 2022/23.

The Venue of the tournament

The BTSC – TRAJKOVSKI ARENA, Skopje.

== Home Ground of TFT Skopje ==
TFT Basket plays matches at the SRC Kale, a multi-functional indoor sports arena. Kale means Fortress Citadel, named after the Skopje's Fortress, located right next to the hall. The capacity of the hall is 4.000 spectators.

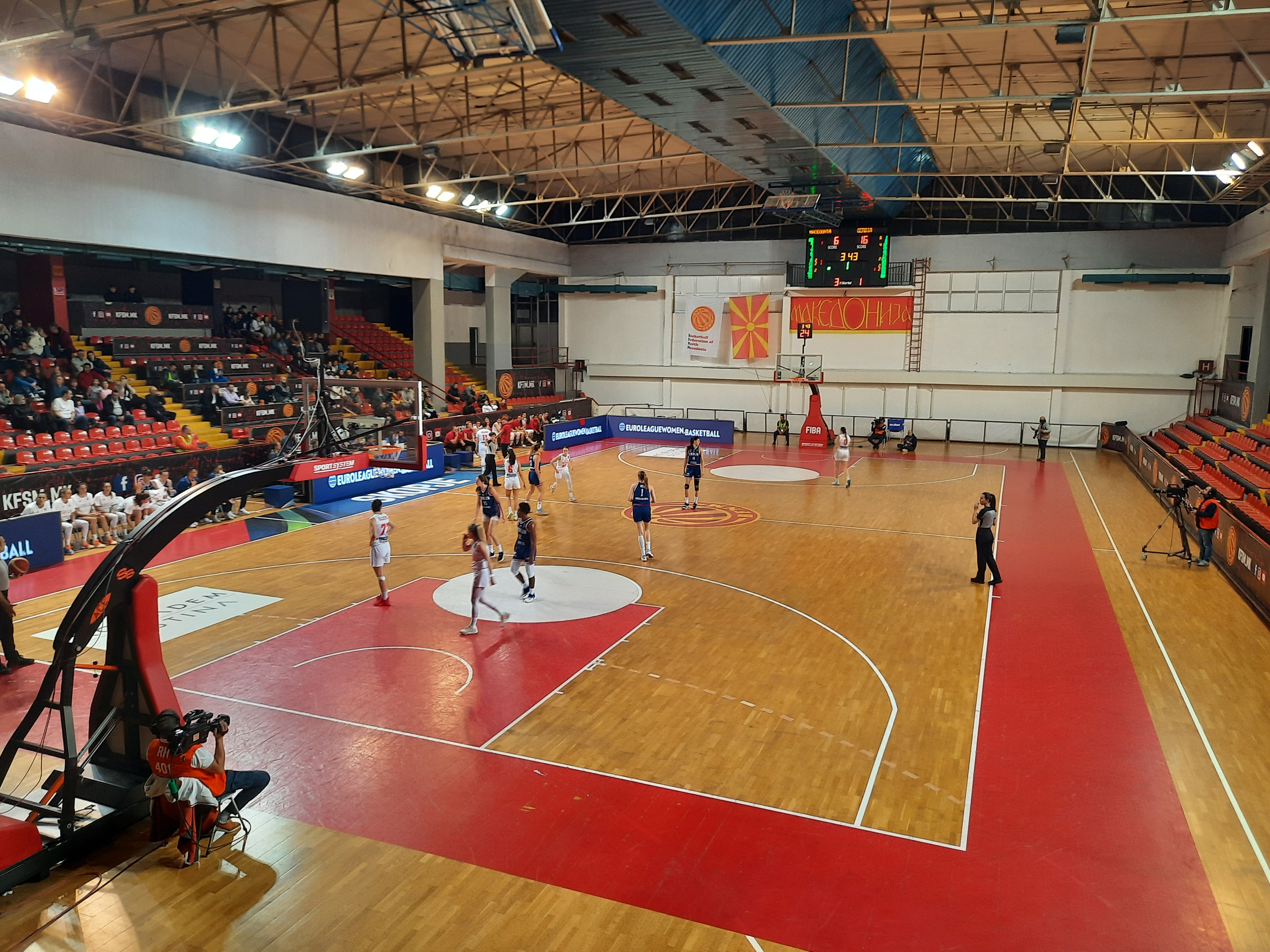

== Honours ==
Macedonia Cup

: 2022

Macedonian Second League (East)

: 2020

BIBL League Seasons

2021:(4-10)6th
2022:(5-9) 8th
2024:(-) withdraw

== European competitions ==
Season	Competition	Round	Club	Home	Away	Aggregrate
2021–22	FIBA Europe Cup	First qualifying round	(Hungary) Szedeák	76–92 (in Krasnoyarsk)		

Season	Competition	Round	Club	Home	Away	Aggregrate
2022–23	Basketball Champions League	First qualifying round	(Germany) Niners Chemnitz	77–96 (in Skopje)		

== Current roster ==
=== Current roster ===
Note: Flags indicate national team eligibility at FIBA-sanctioned events. Players may hold other non-FIBA nationalities not displayed.

KK TFT roster
Players
Coaches

Pos.	No.	Nat.	Name	Ht.	Age
SG	1	(North Macedonia)	Ivanov, Dimitar	1.96 m (6 ft 5 in)	22 – 27 August 2003
SF	6	(North Macedonia)	Stojanoski, Toma	1.98 m (6 ft 6 in)	22 – 14 June 2004
PF	9	(North Macedonia)	Nikolov, Strahil	2.00 m (6 ft 7 in)	26 – 17 July 2000
SF	11	(North Macedonia)	Knežević, Miloš	2.00 m (6 ft 7 in)	20 – 11 October 2005
PG	30	(North Macedonia)	Stojanov, Mihail	1.85 m (6 ft 1 in)	21 – 19 November 2004
SF	77	(North Macedonia)	Zafirov, Georgi	1.96 m (6 ft 5 in)	29 – 7 May 1997
F		(United States)	White, Nakavieon	2.01 m (6 ft 7 in)
F		(Guinea)	Sylla, Sekou	1.95 m (6 ft 5 in)	26 – 31 March 2000
G		(United States)	Comer, Tayshawn	1.85 m (6 ft 1 in)

Head coach

- (North Macedonia) Boro Smilkovski

Assistant coach(es)

- (North Macedonia) Nino Čaćić
- (North Macedonia) Marjan Ugrinovski

Physiotherapist(s)

- (North Macedonia) Dimitar Shavkulovski

Legend

- (C) Team captain
- Injured

- Roster
Updated: 10 August 2026

=== Depth chart ===
Pos.	Starting 5	Bench
C	Strahil Nikolov
PF	Sekou Sylla	Toma Stojanoski
SF	Nakavieon White	Dimitar Ivanov
SG	Georgi Zafirov	Miloš Knežević
PG	Tayshawn Comer	Mihail Stojanov
