= KK Vojvodina =

Basketball club in Novi Sad, Serbia

Vojvodina
- Nickname: Voša; Lale (Tulips)
- Leagues: Basketball League of Serbia
- Founded: 1948; 78 years ago
- History: KK Sloga (1948–1950); KK Vojvodina (1950–present)
- Arena: SPC Vojvodina
- Capacity: 7,022
- Location: Novi Sad, Serbia
- Team colors: Red and White
- President: Željko Rebrača
- Head coach: Miljan Pavković
- Championships: 1 National League Cup
- Website: kkvojvodina.rs

Košarkaški klub Vojvodina (Serbian Cyrillic: Кошаркашки клуб Војводина, English: Vojvodina Basketball Club), commonly referred to as KK Vojvodina or simply Vojvodina, is a professional basketball club based in Novi Sad, Serbia, and the major part of the Vojvodina multi-sport club. The club competes in the top-tier Basketball League of Serbia.

== History ==
During the 2000s and early 2010s, the club was also known as Old Vojvodina to be distinguished from the dissolved and much better known town rivals Vojvodina Srbijagas. At that time, the club functioned as Vojvodina Srbijagas's reserve team. After their dissolving in 2016, Vojvodina received many their players and got promoted to the Basketball League of Serbia for the 2017–18 BLS season.

On 6 June 2022, the club elected Željko Rebrača as their new club's president.

== Cooperation with Dubai Basketball ==
On September 2, 2026 Vojvodina and Dubai Basketball have signed a Memorandum of Understanding (MoU), laying the foundations for future cooperation between the two clubs and establishing shared priorities for their continued development. The Memorandum was signed by the presidents of KK Vojvodina and Dubai Basketball. It expresses the shared intention of the two clubs to establish and develop cooperation, with a focus on improving the conditions for the development of the first team and youth categories, as well as delivering joint promotional and socially responsible initiatives.

== Sponsorship naming ==
The club has had several denominations through the years due to its sponsorship:

- Privredna banka: 1992–1994
- Vojvodina Panšped: 1994–1995
- Vojvodina NIS NAP: 1998–1999

== Players ==
=== Current roster ===
Note: Flags indicate national team eligibility at FIBA-sanctioned events. Players may hold other non-FIBA nationalities not displayed.

KK Vojvodina roster
Players
Coaches

Pos.	No.	Nat.	Name	Ht.		Age
PG		(Serbia)	Musić, Novak	1.88 m (6 ft 2 in)	88 kg (194 lb)	28 – 27 May 1998
C		(Serbia)	Tanasković, Dušan	2.08 m (6 ft 10 in)	103 kg (227 lb)	25 – 23 February 2001
C		(Serbia)	Zečević, Aleksandar	2.08 m (6 ft 10 in)	111 kg (245 lb)	30 – 3 October 1996
SF		(Serbia)	Dautović, Djuro	2.00 m (6 ft 7 in)	93 kg (205 lb)	25 – 4 July 2001
F		(Serbia)	Bursać, Aleksandar	2.05 m (6 ft 9 in)	103 kg (227 lb)	31 – 19 March 1995

Head coach

- (Serbia) Miljan Pavković

Assistant coach(es)

- (Serbia) Stefan Škripac

Legend

- (C) Team captain
- Injured

- Roster
Updated: 23 August 2026

=== Club leaders ===
The following are the club leaders from seasons played in the 1st-tier national championships.

Points scored

1. (Serbia and Montenegro) Zlatko Bolić (2,141)
2. (Socialist Federal Republic of Yugoslavia) Aleksandar Lukić (1,328)
3. (Socialist Federal Republic of Yugoslavia) Nikola Lazić (1,035)
4. (Socialist Federal Republic of Yugoslavia) Miodrag Lopičić (991)
5. (Socialist Federal Republic of Yugoslavia) Željko Radonjić (959)

Games played

1. (Socialist Federal Republic of Yugoslavia) Aleksandar Lukić (179)
2. (Serbia and Montenegro) Zlatko Bolić (140)
3. (Serbia and Montenegro) Nenad Grmuša (108)
4. (Socialist Federal Republic of Yugoslavia) Miodrag Lopičić (107)
5. (Socialist Federal Republic of Yugoslavia) Nikola Lazić (99)

Points per game

1. (Socialist Federal Republic of Yugoslavia) Jovan Malešević (20.9)
2. (Serbia and Montenegro) Mirko Milićević (20.1)
3. (Socialist Federal Republic of Yugoslavia) Slobodan Jelić (19.0)
4. (Socialist Federal Republic of Yugoslavia) Miodrag Gušić (16.3)
5. (Socialist Federal Republic of Yugoslavia) Slobodan Nikolić (16.2)

Last updated on: January 9, 2019

== Coaches ==
- (Socialist Federal Republic of Yugoslavia) Oskar Bozo (1948)
- (Socialist Federal Republic of Yugoslavia) Vojislav Panić
- (Socialist Federal Republic of Yugoslavia) Stevan Putnik
- (Socialist Federal Republic of Yugoslavia) Geza Pastor
- (Socialist Federal Republic of Yugoslavia) Leliks Seleši
- (Socialist Federal Republic of Yugoslavia) Ladislav Demšar (1961–1964)
- (Socialist Federal Republic of Yugoslavia) Dušan Šušnjević (1964–1967)
- (Hungary) László Rátgéber (1967–1968)
- (Socialist Federal Republic of Yugoslavia) Ištvan Šmit
- (Socialist Federal Republic of Yugoslavia) Milutin Minja (1973–1974)
- (Socialist Federal Republic of Yugoslavia) Dragan Kecojević (1970s)
- (Socialist Federal Republic of Yugoslavia) László Mezei (1975–1976)
- (Socialist Federal Republic of Yugoslavia) Ferenc Gal (1976)
- (Socialist Federal Republic of Yugoslavia) Silvester Tóth (1976–1977)
- (Socialist Federal Republic of Yugoslavia) Milan Vasojević (1978–1979)
- (Socialist Federal Republic of Yugoslavia) Dušan Ivković (1987–1990)
- (Socialist Federal Republic of Yugoslavia) Jovan Malešević (1990–1991)
- (Socialist Federal Republic of Yugoslavia) Nenad Mušikić (1991)
- (Socialist Federal Republic of Yugoslavia) Zoran Mirković (1991–1992)
- (Serbia and Montenegro) Branislav Jemč (1992)
- (Serbia and Montenegro) Borislav Džaković (1992)
- (Serbia and Montenegro) Nenad Mušikić (1993)
- (Serbia and Montenegro) Rajko Toroman (1993)
- (Serbia and Montenegro) Boško Đokić (1993–1994)
- (North Macedonia) Janko Lukovski (1994–1995)
- (Serbia and Montenegro) Goran Miljković (1995–1996)
- (Serbia and Montenegro) Jovan Malešević (1996)
- (North Macedonia) Janko Lukovski (1996–1997)
- (Serbia and Montenegro) Željko Lukajić (1997–1998)
- (Serbia and Montenegro) Ljubomir Poček (1998–1999)
- (Serbia and Montenegro) Mile Medaković (1999–2002)
- (Serbia and Montenegro) Zoran Trivan (2002–2003)
- (Serbia and Montenegro) Miodrag Bojković (2003–2004)
- (Serbia and Montenegro) Ivica Mavrenski (2004–2005)
- (Serbia) Vladan Dragosavac (2005–2009)
- (Serbia) Miljan Čurović (2010–2011)
- (Serbia) Nebojša Zeković (2011–2013)
- (Serbia) Filip Socek (2014–2019)
- (Serbia) Marko Skoko (2019)
- (Serbia) Filip Socek (2019–2020)
- (Serbia) Miroslav Nikolić (2020–2022)
- (Serbia) Miloš Isakov Kovačević (2022–2024)

== Hall of Famers and contributors ==
FIBA Hall of Fame

Vojvodina Hall of Famers
Coaches
Name	Position	Tenure	Inducted
Dušan Ivković	Head coach	1987–1990	2017
Milan Vasojević	Head coach	1978–1979	2022

50 Greatest EuroLeague Contributors

Vojvodina EuroLeague Contributors
Coaches
Name	Position	Tenure	Inducted
Dušan Ivković	Head coach	1987–1990	2008

== Trophies and awards ==
=== Trophies ===
- League Cup of Serbia (2nd-tier)
  - Winner (1): 2020–21
- Yugoslav Federal B League
  - Winner (1): 1987–88

== Notable players ==
- (Serbia and Montenegro) Zlatko Bolić
- (Serbia and Montenegro) Dragan Lukovski
- (Serbia and Montenegro) Veselin Petrović
- (Serbia and Montenegro) Jovo Stanojević
- (Serbia and Montenegro) Zoran Jovanović
- (Socialist Federal Republic of Yugoslavia) Dino Bilalović
- (Serbia) Dušan Domović Bulut
- (Serbia) Filip Rebrača

== International record ==
Season	Achievement	Notes
FIBA Korać Cup
1995–96	Round of 32	Eliminated by Festina Andorra, 145–148 (1–1)
1990–91	Round of 32	Eliminated by Shampoo Clear Cantù, 167–169 (1–1)
1997–98	Regular season	3rd in Group M with Calze Pompea Roma, Maccabi Rishon LeZion, Helios Domžale (3–3)
1991–92	Second round	Eliminated by Panathinaikos, 145–155 (1–1)
1992–93	Second round	Eliminated by Nová huť ANES Ostrava, 0–4 (0–2)

== Basketball Association of Vojvodina ==
The Basketball Association of Vojvodina (KSV) plays a key role in the development of basketball in the region, with the Basketball Club Vojvodina holding a central place in its ecosystem. KSV organizes regional competitions, provides support to clubs such as KK Vojvodina, and implements programs for the development of young talents. It is supported by the company Meridian Sport.
