= List of KK Partizan seasons =

Košarkaški klub Partizan is a Serbian professional basketball club based in Belgrade, that competes in the Basketball League of Serbia, Adriatic League and EuroLeague. The club was founded on 4 October 1945, as a basketball section of the Sports Association of the Central House of the Yugoslav Army. During its more than six decades long history, Partizan has won as many as 51 trophies. The "Black and White" players were the state champions twenty two times, they won the National Cup sixteen times, three times they won Korać Cup, they were champions of the Adriatic League eight times, and they won ABA League Supercup one times. The most significant trophy the club has won is the European Champion trophy at the Final Four of the European Champion's Cup in Istanbul in 1992.

== Seasons ==
Season	League	Cup	Regional	Europe	Head Coach	President
1945–46	Yugoslav League; 4th place	No tournament	No tournament	No tournament	Božo Grkinić	Peko Dapčević
1946–47	Yugoslav League; 3rd place	No tournament	No tournament	No tournament	Božo Grkinić	Svetislav Šaper
1947–48	Yugoslav League; Did not participate	No tournament	No tournament	No tournament		Svetislav Šaper
1948–49	Yugoslav League; Runners-up	No tournament	No tournament	No tournament	Svetislav Šaper	Svetislav Šaper
1949–50	Yugoslav League; Runners-up	No tournament	No tournament	No tournament	Janoš Gerdov	Svetislav Šaper
1950–51	Yugoslav League; Runners-up	No tournament	No tournament	No tournament	Borislav Stanković	Svetislav Šaper
1951–52	Yugoslav League; 3rd place	No tournament	No tournament	No tournament	Borislav Stanković	Svetislav Šaper
1952–53	Yugoslav League; 4th place	No tournament	No tournament	No tournament	Borislav Stanković	Svetislav Šaper
1953–54	Yugoslav League; 5th place	No tournament	No tournament	No tournament	Miodrag Stefanović	Aleksandar Belojević
1954–55	Yugoslav League; 3rd place	No tournament	No tournament	No tournament	Mirko Marjanović	Aleksandar Belojević
1955–56	Yugoslav League; 3rd place	No tournament	No tournament	No tournament	Mirko Marjanović	Aleksandar Belojević
1956–57	Yugoslav League; 7th place	No tournament	No tournament	No tournament	Mirko Marjanović	Aleksandar Belojević
1957–58	Yugoslav League; 6th place	No tournament	No tournament	Did not participate	Mirko Marjanović	Aleksandar Belojević
1958–59	Yugoslav League; 4th place	Yugoslav Cup; Eighthfinals	No tournament	Did not participate	Aleksandar Nikolić	Aleksandar Belojević
1959–60	Yugoslav League; 4th place	Did not participate	No tournament	Did not participate	Aleksandar Nikolić	Aleksandar Belojević
1960–61	Yugoslav League; 5th place	No tournament	No tournament	Did not participate	Aleksandar Nikolić	Aleksandar Belojević
1961–62	Yugoslav League; 6th place	Yugoslav Cup; Runners-up	No tournament	Did not participate	Božidar Munćan	Aleksandar Belojević
1962–63	Yugoslav League; Runners-up	No tournament	No tournament	Did not participate	Božidar Munćan	Aleksandar Belojević
1963–64	Yugoslav League; 7th place	No tournament	No tournament	Did not participate	Milenko Novaković	Jovan Tarabić
1964–65	Yugoslav League; 5th place	No tournament	No tournament	Did not participate	Borislav Ćurčić	Jovan Tarabić
1965–66	Yugoslav League; Runners-up	No tournament	No tournament	Did not participate	Borislav Ćurčić	Jovan Tarabić
1966–67	Yugoslav League; 7th place	No tournament	No tournament	Cup Winners' Cup; Quarterfinals	Borislav Ćurčić	Jovan Tarabić
1967–68	Yugoslav League; 4th place	No tournament	No tournament	Did not participate	Branislav Rajačić	Jovan Tarabić
1968–69	Yugoslav League; 6th place	Yugoslav Cup; Quarterfinals	No tournament	Did not participate	Branislav Rajačić	Jovan Tarabić
1969–70	Yugoslav League; 9th place	Yugoslav Cup; Eighthfinals	No tournament	Did not participate	Radovan Radović	Jovan Tarabić
1970–71	Yugoslav League; 10th place	Yugoslav Cup; Eighthfinals	No tournament	Did not participate	Radovan Radović	Jovan Tarabić
1971–72	Yugoslav League; 6th place	Yugoslav Cup; Eighthfinals	No tournament	Did not participate	Ranko Žeravica	Nedeljko Čermak
1972–73	Yugoslav League; 3rd place	Yugoslav Cup; Runners-up	No tournament	Did not participate	Ranko Žeravica	Nedeljko Čermak
1973–74	Yugoslav League; 6th place	Yugoslav Cup; Semifinals	No tournament	Korać Cup; Runners-up	Ranko Žeravica	Slavko Zečević
1974–75	Yugoslav League; 3rd place	Yugoslav Cup; Eighthfinals	No tournament	Korać Cup; Semifinals	Borislav Ćorković	Slavko Zečević
1975–76	Yugoslav League; Champions	Yugoslav Cup; Quarterfinals	No tournament	Korać Cup; Quarterfinals	Borislav Ćorković	Momčilo Cemović
1976–77	Yugoslav League; 3rd place	Yugoslav Cup; Round of 32	No tournament	Champions Cup; Quarterfinals	Ranko Žeravica	Milisav Stijović
1977–78	Yugoslav League; Runners-up	Yugoslav Cup; Round of 32	No tournament	Korać Cup; Champions	Ranko Žeravica	Milisav Stijović
1978–79	Yugoslav League; Champions	Yugoslav Cup; Champions	No tournament	Korać Cup; Champions	Dušan Ivković	Milisav Stijović
1979–80	Yugoslav League; 4th place	Yugoslav Cup; Quarterfinals	No tournament	Champions Cup; 6th place	Dušan Ivković	Radoslav Radović
1980–81	Yugoslav League; Champions	Yugoslav Cup; Quarterfinals	No tournament	Korać Cup; Quarterfinals	Borislav Ćorković	Radoslav Radović
1981–82	Yugoslav League; Runners-up	Yugoslav Cup; Quarterfinals	No tournament	Champions Cup; 3rd place	Borislav Ćorković	Milorad Savićević
1982–83	Yugoslav League; Semifinals	Yugoslav Cup; Second round	No tournament	Korać Cup; Quarterfinals	Borislav Džaković	Tomislav Jeremić
1983–84	Yugoslav League; Quarterfinals	Yugoslav Cup; Eighthfinals	No tournament	Korać Cup; Second round	Borislav Džaković	Tomislav Jeremić
1984–85	Yugoslav League; Semifinals	Yugoslav Cup; Eighthfinals	No tournament	Did not participate	Zoran Slavnić	Tomislav Jeremić
1985–86	Yugoslav League; Semifinals	Yugoslav Cup; Quarterfinals	No tournament	Korać Cup; Quarterfinals	Vladislav Lučić	Tomislav Jeremić
1986–87	Yugoslav League; Champions	Yugoslav Cup; Semifinals	No tournament	Korać Cup; Quarterfinals	Vladislav Lučić; Duško Vujošević	Tomislav Jeremić
1987–88	Yugoslav League; Runners-up	Yugoslav Cup; Semifinals	No tournament	Champions Cup; 3rd place	Duško Vujošević	Tomislav Jeremić
1988–89	Yugoslav League; Runners-up	Yugoslav Cup; Champions	No tournament	Korać Cup; Champions	Duško Vujošević	Tomislav Jeremić
1989–90	Yugoslav League; 8th Place	Yugoslav Cup; Quarterfinals	No tournament	Cup Winners' Cup; Quarterfinals	Dejan Srzić; Borislav Ćorković	Radojica Nikčević
1990–91	Yugoslav League; Runners-up	Yugoslav Cup; Quarterfinals	No tournament	Did not participate	Duško Vujošević	Radojica Nikčević
1991–92	Yugoslav League; Champions	Yugoslav Cup; Champions	No tournament	European League; Champions	Željko Obradović	Radojica Nikčević
1992–93	Yugoslav League; Runners-up	Yugoslav Cup; Runners-up	No tournament	European League; Disqualified	Željko Obradović	Milorad Đurić
1993–94	Yugoslav League; Runners-up	Yugoslav Cup; Champions	No tournament	Did not participate	Željko Lukajić	Nenad Naerlović
1994–95	Yugoslav League; Champions	Yugoslav Cup; Champions	No tournament	Did not participate	Borislav Džaković	Nenad Naerlović
1995–96	Yugoslav League; Champions	Yugoslav Cup; Runners-up	No tournament	European League; Second round European Cup; Quarterfinals	Borislav Džaković; Ranko Žeravica	Jovica Pavlović
1996–97	Yugoslav League; Champions	Yugoslav Cup; Runners-up	No tournament	Euroleague; Eighth-finals	Miroslav Nikolić	Jovica Pavlović
1997–98	Yugoslav League; Semifinals	Yugoslav Cup; Semifinals	No tournament	Euroleague; 4th Place	Miroslav Nikolić; Milovan Bogojević	Boriša Vuković
1998–99	Yugoslav League; 3rd Place	Yugoslav Cup; Champions	No tournament	Saporta Cup; Quarterfinals	Vladislav Lučić	Boriša Vuković
1999–00	Yugoslav League; Runners-up	Yugoslav Cup; Champions	No tournament	Saporta Cup; Group stage	Nenad Trajković	Ivica Dačić
2000–01	Yugoslav League; Runners-up	Yugoslav Cup; Runners-up	No tournament	Suproleague; Eight-finals	Nenad Trajković; Darko Ruso	Vlade Divac
2001–02	Yugoslav League; Champions	Yugoslav Cup; Champions	Did not participate	Euroleague; Group Stage	Duško Vujošević	Vlade Divac
2002–03	Yugoslav League; Champions	Radivoj Korać Cup; Semifinals	Did not participate	Euroleague; Group Stage	Duško Vujošević	Vlade Divac
2003–04	Serbia and Montenegro League; Champions	Radivoj Korać Cup; Semifinals	Did not participate	Euroleague; Group Stage	Duško Vujošević	Vlade Divac
2004–05	Serbia and Montenegro League; Champions	Radivoj Korać Cup; Runners-up	Adriatic League; Runners-up	Euroleague; Group Stage	Duško Vujošević	Jovica Pavlović
2005–06	Serbia and Montenegro League; Champions	Radivoj Korać Cup; Semifinals	Adriatic League; Runners-up	Euroleague; Group Stage	Duško Vujošević	Dušan Pavlović
2006–07	Basketball League of Serbia; Champions	Radivoj Korać Cup; Runners-up	Adriatic League; Champions	Euroleague; Top 16	Duško Vujošević	Predrag Danilović
2007–08	Basketball League of Serbia; Champions	Radivoj Korać Cup; Winners	Adriatic League; Champions	Euroleague; Quarterfinals	Duško Vujošević	Predrag Danilović
2008–09	Basketball League of Serbia; Champions	Radivoj Korać Cup; Winners	Adriatic League; Champions	Euroleague; Quarterfinals	Duško Vujošević	Predrag Danilović
2009–10	Basketball League of Serbia; Champions	Radivoj Korać Cup; Winners	Adriatic League; Champions	Euroleague; 4th Place	Duško Vujošević	Predrag Danilović
2010–11	Basketball League of Serbia; Champions	Radivoj Korać Cup; Winners	Adriatic League; Champions	Euroleague; Top 16	Vlada Jovanović	Predrag Danilović
2011–12	Basketball League of Serbia; Champions	Radivoj Korać Cup; Winners	Adriatic League; Semifinals	Euroleague; Group Stage	Vlada Jovanović	Predrag Danilović
2012–13	Basketball League of Serbia; Champions	Radivoj Korać Cup; Runners-up	Adriatic League; Champions	Euroleague; Group Stage	Duško Vujošević	Predrag Danilović
2013–14	Basketball League of Serbia; Champions	Radivoj Korać Cup; Quarterfinals	Adriatic League; Semifinals	Euroleague; Top 16	Duško Vujošević	Predrag Danilović
2014–15	Basketball League of Serbia; Runners-up	Radivoj Korać Cup; Semifinals	Adriatic League; Semifinals	Eurocup; Regular Season	Duško Vujošević	Predrag Danilović
2015–16	Basketball League of Serbia; Runners-up	Radivoj Korać Cup; Runners-up	Adriatic League; 5th place	Did not participate	Petar Božić (until 5 January 2016); Aleksandar Džikić	Nikola Peković
2016–17	Basketball League of Serbia; Semifinals	Radivoj Korać Cup; Runners-up	Adriatic League; Semifinals	Champions League; Play-offs qualifiers	Aleksandar Džikić	Nikola Peković
2017–18	Basketball League of Serbia; Semifinals	Radivoj Korać Cup; Winners	Adriatic League; 5th place	Eurocup; Regular Season	Miroslav Nikolić (until 12 December 2017); Nenad Čanak	Ostoja Mijailović
2018–19	Basketball League of Serbia; Runners-up	Radivoj Korać Cup; Winners	Adriatic League; Semifinals	Eurocup; Top 16	Nenad Čanak (until 27 October 2018); Andrea Trinchieri	Ostoja Mijailović
2019–20	Basketball League of Serbia; Cancelled (Note: Season was canceled due to COVID-19 pandemic)	Radivoj Korać Cup; Winners	Adriatic League; Cancelled	Eurocup; Cancelled	Andrea Trinchieri	Ostoja Mijailović
2020–21	Basketball League of Serbia; Semifinals	Radivoj Korać Cup; Semifinals	Adriatic League; 7th place	Eurocup; Top 16	Vlado Šćepanović (until 30 October 2020); Milivoje Lazić (interim) (30 October – 5 November); Sašo Filipovski (5 November 2020 – 8 March 2021); Aleksandar Matović (from 8 March 2021)	Ostoja Mijailović
2021–22	Basketball League of Serbia; Did not participate	Radivoj Korać Cup; Runners-up	Adriatic League; Runners-up	Eurocup; Eighthfinals	Željko Obradović	Ostoja Mijailović
2022–23	Basketball League of Serbia; Disqualified	Radivoj Korać Cup; Semifinals	Adriatic League; Champions	Euroleague; Quarterfinals	Željko Obradović	Ostoja Mijailović
2023–24	Basketball League of Serbia; Runners-up	Radivoj Korać Cup; Runners-up	Adriatic League; Runners-up	Euroleague; 11th	Željko Obradović	Ostoja Mijailović
2024–25	Basketball League of Serbia; Champions	Radivoj Korać Cup; Runners-up	Adriatic League; Champions	Euroleague; 12th	Željko Obradović; Bogdan Karaičić (interim – June 2025)	Ostoja Mijailović
2025–26	Basketball League of Serbia	Radivoj Korać Cup	Adriatic League	Euroleague; 15th	Željko Obradović	Ostoja Mijailović
