= Teo Čizmić =

Croatian basketball coach

KK Split
- Title: Sport director
- League: HT Premijer liga

Personal information
- Born: 30 March 1971 (age 55) Split, SR Croatia, SFR Yugoslavia
- Listed height: 2.05 m (6 ft 9 in)

Career information
- NBA draft: 1993: undrafted
- Playing career: 1988–2006
- Position: Power forward
- Coaching career: 2006–present

Career history

Playing
- 1988–1995: Jugoplastika / Pop 84
- 1995–1997: Postojna
- 1997–1998: Karlovac
- 1998–1999: Hapoel Galil Elyon
- 1999–2001: Troy Pilsner
- 2001–2004: Oostende
- 2004–2005: Troy Pilsner
- 2005–2006: Split

Coaching
- 2006–2008: Split (assistant)
- 2008–2009: Split
- 2009–2011: Steaua București
- 2011–2012: Cibona (assistant)
- 2012–2013: Koszalin
- 2014–2016: Körmend
- 2017–2018: Atomerőmű
- 2018–2019: Cedevita (assistant)
- 2019–2021: Cedevita Olimpija (assistant)
- 2021-2022: ZTE KK
- 2022-present: KK Split (sport director)

Career highlights
- As player: 3× EuroLeague champion (1989, 1990, 1991); 4× Yugoslav League champion (1988, 1989, 1990, 1991); 2× Yugoslav Cup winner (1990, 1991); 3× Croatian Cup winner (1992, 1993, 1994); As head coach: Hungarian Cup winner (2016)

Teo Čizmić (born 30 March 1971) is a Croatian professional basketball coach and former player, currently serving as the sport director at KK Split.

== Playing career ==
Čizmić started playing professional basketball in 1988 with Split-based team Jugoplastika. He won three EuroLeagues, and played with the famous Croatian players Velimir Perasović, Dino Rađa and Toni Kukoč on the team. He finished his career as a player with Split in 2006.

== Coaching career ==
At the beginning of his coaching career, Čizmić was the assistant coach for Split of the Croatian League. In 2006–07 season Split managed to qualify for the semifinals of the national championship which it lost. In 2007–08 season Split managed to play the Croatian league final which they lost. On 17 December 2008, Čizmić succeeded Slobodan Subotić as head coach at Split. On 5 May 2009, he resigned from his hometown club.

Following the resignation in Split, he was named the head coach of Romanian League team Steaua Bucuresti, with whom in 2009–10 season, he managed to qualify for the play-offs. In the next season, Steaua Bucuresti played EuroChallenge competition. Čizmić left Steaua in 2011. In 2011–12 season, he was the assistant coach to Veljko Mršić at Cibona. In 2012 he was named the head coach of Polish League team AZS Koszalin. He left the club in 2013.

In 2015 Čizmić was appointed the head coach for Hungarian club BC Körmend. In 2017 he was named the coach for Atomeromu SE. He left the club in June 2018, and became the assistant coach of Cedevita under the coaching staff of the head coach Slaven Rimac.

== Personal life ==
His son Leo is also a professional basketball player.
