= 1988–89 Yugoslav First Basketball League =

- League: Yugoslav First Basketball League
- Sport: Basketball

Regular season
- Season champions: (Socialist Republic of Serbia) Partizan

Playoffs
- Finals champions: (Socialist Republic of Croatia) Jugoplastika
- Runners-up: Partizan

Yugoslav First Basketball League seasons
- ← 1987–88 1989–90 →

The 1988–89 Yugoslav First Basketball League season was the 45th season of the Yugoslav First Basketball League, the highest professional basketball league in SFR Yugoslavia.

== Teams ==
(Socialist Republic of Serbia) SR Serbia

- Borac Čačak
- Crvena Zvezda
- IMT
- Partizan
- Prvi partizan Titovo Užice
- Vojvodina

(Socialist Republic of Croatia) SR Croatia

- Cibona
- Jugoplastika
- Šibenka
- Zadar

(Socialist Republic of Bosnia and Herzegovina) SR Bosnia and Herzegovina

- Bosna

(Socialist Republic of Slovenia) SR Slovenia

- Smelt Olimpija

== Regular season ==
=== Classification ===
	Regular season ranking 1988-89	G	V	P	PF	PS	Pt
1.	Partizan	22	16	6	2096	1879	38
2.	Jugoplastika	22	16	6	1940	1729	38
3.	Bosna	22	15	7	1911	1776	37
4.	Crvena Zvezda	22	14	8	1921	1843	36
5.	Zadar	22	14	8	1920	1710	36
6.	Smelt Olimpija	22	14	8	2059	1799	36
7.	Cibona	22	12	10	1936	1919	34
8.	IMT	22	10	12	2016	2081	32
9.	Vojvodina	22	9	13	1902	1932	31
10.	Šibenka	22	6	16	1906	2172	28
11.	Prvi partizan	22	3	19	1707	2125	25
12.	Borac Čačak	22	3	19	1844	2277	25

== Results ==
Home \ Away	PAR	JUG	BOS	CZV	ZAD	OLI	CIB	IMT	VOJ	ŠIB	PP	BOR
Partizan	—	94–84	89–75	94–97	91–77	89–76	83–85	99–95	110–97	109–91	97–86	130–77
Jugoplastika	75–76	—	83–73	83–65	70–71	94–92	89–88	91–81	80–74	110–82	101–71	109–84
Bosna	74–72	76–74	—	98–90	79–65	72–68	93–83	80–92	83–76	125–91	74–60	127–85
Crvena Zvezda	99–98	89–84	76–80	—	71–68	101–88	81–90	111–93	96–101	115–89	84–76	103–80
Zadar	71–73	77–60	99–68	67–65	—	89–85	82–88	101–83	87–74	124–93	93–57	107–83
Olimpija	105–84	79–83	87–86	73–77	80–74	—	99–87	109–92	96–72	119–81	109–64	137–84
Cibona	85–83	82–85	87–85	78–75	90–98	74–106	—	103–104	100–104	109–89	86–72	90–82
IMT	81–97	74–89	88–85	91–94	83–82	101–88	99–85	—	76–93	86–83	86–83	141–102
Vojvodina	95–106	72–86	70–92	72–81	81–80	76–89	69–86	111–100	—	105–83	112–79	114–87
Šibenka	86–110	73–89	77–88	93–89	83–106	77–90	91–88	104–82	87–80	—	93–83	89–73
Prvi partizan	83–89	61–94	89–116	87–90	79–104	82–87	72–93	76–84	76–87	84–82	—	93–80
Borac Čačak	85–123	95–127	75–82	69–84	74–98	72–90	78–79	115–104	72–67	108–89	84–94	—

Source: Pearlbasket
Legend: Blue = home team win; Red = away team win.
Matches with lighter background shading were decided after overtime.

== Playoff ==
Semifinals
1	Partizan	2
4	Crvena Zvezda	1
2	Jugoplastika	2
3	Bosna	0

Finals
1	Partizan	0
2	Jugoplastika	3

SEMIFINALS

Jugoplastika-Bosna 86-69, 96-68

Partizan-Crvena Zvezda 105-92, 83-85, 100-95

FINALS

Partizan-Jugoplastika 73-74, 70-75, 0-2

GROUP KORAC

Cibona-Sloboda Dita 121-82, 94-98, ?

IMT-Zorka 75-72, 93-96, ?

Olimpija-Cibona 81-73, 74-80, 78-76

Zadar-IMT 133-85, 97-82

== Finals ==
The Yugoslav First League's 1989 playoffs final series saw the regular season top seed and newly-minted FIBA Korać Cup winner KK Partizan take on the regular season second seed and newly crowned European champions Jugoplastika.

=== Game 1: Partizan vs. Jugoplastika 73-74 ===
Game one was played on 22 April 1989 in front of 6,500 spectators at Hala sportova, refereed by Zoran Grbac (from Šibenik) and Tomislav Jovančić (from Valjevo).

For most of the second half, the game was a tense seesaw affair with frequent lead changes. With less than two minutes to go and Jugoplastika up by one, Partizan played the ball down in the low post to Vlade Divac who quickly got double-teamed and kicked the ball out to the open teammate on the three-point line, young shooting guard Predrag Danilović. Nineteen-year-old Danilović air-balled the wide open three and Jugoplastika's Toni Kukoč, who grabbed Danilović's air ball, ran a quick counterattack with Partizan's defence out of position, passing off to wide open Goran Sobin who scored for 71-74. By the end, Partizan only managed to get closer to 73-74 via Divac drawing a foul then hitting two free throws. After successfully defending Jugoplastika's following possession, Partizan then had the game's last possession with 23 seconds left. The ball once again went to Divac who drove right from the left side of the half court, getting into traffic of defensive Jugoplastika bodies under the basket and missing his half-hook shot. Jugoplastika won away, 73-74, behind Sobin's game-high 21 points, thus taking the home-court advantage from Partizan.

=== Game 2: Jugoplastika vs. Partizan 75-70 ===
Played in front packed Gripe Hall with 8,000 spectators, visitors Partizan were up 43-44 at the half.

In the second half, the lead kept changing throughout the period. Entering the last minute of play, with Jugoplastika up by 3, Partizan point guard Saša Đorđević's three-point attempt was blocked by Luka Pavićević who then grabbed the ball and ran it the other way for a layup and 75-70 Jugoplastika lead. In Partizan's following possession, Žarko Paspalj got fouled in the act of shooting with 28 seconds left in the game. During the timeout before Paspalj's free throws, already incensed with some of the prior decisions by the two refs—Zdravko Kurilić (from Tuzla) and Ljupče Ristovski (from Skopje)—Partizan's head coach Duško Vujošević began intensely going at Kurilić verbally and was assessed a technical foul. With Vujošević continually raging at referee Kurilić and Partizan bench pelted with coins and other objects by the Split crowd, Vujošević decided to take his team off the court and not return. The score at the time of Partizan's walk-out, 75-70, was registered as the final score of the game.

=== Game 3: Jugoplastika vs. Partizan 2-0 ===
The Yugoslav Basketball Federation's (KSJ) competition commission headed by Radomir Šaper looked into the case of Partizan walking off the court in game two and decided to register game three administratively as a 2-0 Jugoplastika home win. Jugoplastika thus won the 1988-89 Yugoslav League title, beating Partizan 3-games-to-0.

The winning roster of Jugoplastika:

- (Socialist Federal Republic of Yugoslavia) Zoran Sretenović
- (Socialist Federal Republic of Yugoslavia) Velimir Perasović
- (Socialist Federal Republic of Yugoslavia) Toni Kukoč
- (Socialist Federal Republic of Yugoslavia) Goran Sobin
- (Socialist Federal Republic of Yugoslavia) Ivica Burić
- (Socialist Federal Republic of Yugoslavia) Žan Tabak
- (Socialist Federal Republic of Yugoslavia) Duško Ivanović
- (Socialist Federal Republic of Yugoslavia) Dino Rađa
- (Socialist Federal Republic of Yugoslavia) Petar Vučica
- (Socialist Federal Republic of Yugoslavia) Paško Tomić
- (Socialist Federal Republic of Yugoslavia) Teo Čizmić
- (Socialist Federal Republic of Yugoslavia) Luka Pavićević

Coach: (Socialist Federal Republic of Yugoslavia) Božidar Maljković

== Scoring leaders ==
1. Milan Mlađan (IMT) - __ points (30.8 ppg) or (31.1ppg)

== Play-out ==
Six teams competed to qualify to the 1989-90 Yugoslav basketball league (9th-placed Vojvodina and 10th-placed Šibenka in the A league; second-placed MZT Skopje and third-placed OKK Beograd in IB league - "East" division; second-placed Novi Zagreb and third-placed Servo Mihalj in IB league - "West" division

=== Qualifying round ===
MZT Skopje - "Servo Mihalj" Proleter Zrenjanin 102-90, 86-87, 93-84

Novi Zagreb - OKK Beograd 83-81, 73-87, 90-68

=== Final round ===
		W	L	Status
1	Vojvodina	6	0	Qualification for 1989-90 Yugoslav first basketball league
2	Novi Zagreb	3	3	Qualification for 1989-90 Yugoslav first basketball league
3	MZT Skopje	3	3	
4	Šibenka	0	6	

Vojvodina - Novi Zagreb 98-73 Šibenka - MZT 94-96

MZT -Vojvodina 72-89, Novi Zagreb - Šibenka ?;

Vojvodina - Šibenka 104-75, MZT - Novi Zagreb 73-71,

MZT- Šibenka ?, Novi Zagreb - Vojvodina ?

Šibenka- Novi Zagreb 76-89, Vojvodina - MZT 100-81,

Šibenka -Vojvodina 95-98, Novi Zagreb - MZT 90-85

== Qualification in 1989-90 season European competitions ==
FIBA European Champions Cup

- Jugoplastika (champions)

FIBA Cup Winners' Cup

- Partizan (Cup winners)

FIBA Korać Cup

- Bosna (3rd)
- Crvena Zvezda (4th)
- Zadar (playoffs)
- Smelt Olimpija (playoffs)

== Basketball Cup ==
=== Bracket ===
Eightfinals
Čelik
Partizan
Borovo
Bosna
Cibona
Vojvodina
Zadar
Rabotnički
Kolubara
Olimpija
IMT
Zorka Šabac
Jugoplastika
Budućnost
Crvena zvezda
Trepča

Quarterfinals
Partizan	91
Bosna	77
Cibona	94
Rabotnički	78
Olimpija	78
Zorka Šabac	69
Jugoplastika	77
Crvena zvezda	75

Semifinals
Partizan	103
Cibona	79
Olimpija	67
Jugoplastika	87

Finals
Partizan	87
Jugoplastika	74
