= 1987–88 KK Partizan season =

Partizan
1987–88 season
- President: Tomsilav Jeremić
- Head coach: Duško Vujošević
- Yugoslav First Basketball League: Runners-up
- Yugoslav Cup: Semifinals
- European Champions Cup: 3rd place

In the 1987–88 season, Partizan Belgrade competed in the Yugoslav First Basketball League, Yugoslav Cup and European Champions Cup.

== Yugoslav First Basketball League ==
	Regular season ranking 1987–88	G	V	P	PF	PS	Pt
1.	Jugoplastika	22	21	1	2025	1764	43
2.	Cibona	22	17	5	2235	2007	39
3.	Partizan	22	15	7	2066	1973	37
4.	Smelt Olimpija	22	14	8	2018	1943	36

=== Regular season ===
26 September 1987 1	Partizan	85–95	Crvena zvezda	Belgrade
	Pts: Đorđević 28		Pts: Prelević 27	Arena: Pionir Hall; Attendance: 4,000

3 October 1987 2	Olimpija	87–92	Partizan	Ljubljana
	Pts: Tovornik 29		Pts: Paspalj 23	Arena: Tivoli Hall; Attendance: 5,000

6 October 1987 3	Borac Čačak	81–89	Partizan	Čačak
	Pts: Ivanović 29		Pts: Đorđević, Grbović, Paspalj 19	Arena: Borac Hall; Attendance: 3,000

11 October 1987 4	Partizan	79–87	Jugoplastika	Belgrade
	Pts: Grbović 23		Pts: Kukoč 27	Arena: Pionir Hall; Attendance: 6,000

18 October 1987 5	Šibenka	87–76	Partizan	Šibenik
	Pts: Žurić 40		Pts: Đorđević 24	Attendance: 2,500

25 October 1987 6	Partizan	84–78	Zadar	Belgrade
	Pts: Divac 25		Pts: Petranović 29	Arena: Pionir Hall; Attendance: 4,000

7 November 1987 7	IMT	85–95	Partizan	Belgrade
	Pts: Krečković 24		Pts: Paspalj 30	Arena: Pinki Hall; Attendance: 2,000

21 November 1987 8	Partizan	115–110(OT)	Bosna	Belgrade
	Pts: Paspalj 47		Pts: Benaček 29	Arena: Pionir Hall; Attendance: 1,000

29 November 1987 9	MZT Skopje	80–95	Partizan	Skopje
	Pts: Zivčević 23		Pts: Divac 37	Arena: Jane Sandanski Hall; Attendance: 3,000

6 December 1987 10	Partizan	103–94	Budućnost	Belgrade
	Pts: Grbović 25		Pts: Antić 33	Arena: Pionir Hall; Attendance: 600

13 December 1987 11	Cibona	99–90	Partizan	Zagreb
	Pts: Petrović 36		Pts: Grbović 28	Arena: Cibona Sports Centre; Attendance: 5,000

20 December 1987 12	Crvena zvezda	85–106	Partizan	Belgrade
	Pts: Prelević 23		Pts: Grbović 23	Arena: Pionir Hall; Attendance: 7,000

10 January 1988 13	Partizan	93–98(OT)	Olimpija	Belgrade
	Pts: Paspalj 25		Pts: Vilfan 23	Arena: Hala sportova Attendance: 2,500

16 January 1988 14	Partizan	98–99(OT)	Borac Čačak	Belgrade
	Pts: Divac 21		Pts: Kocić 35	Arena: Hala sportova Attendance: 3,000

24 January 1988 15	Jugoplastika	90–85	Partizan	Split
	Pts: Ivanović 19		Pts: Paspalj 20	Arena: Arena Gripe; Attendance: 6,000

14 February 1988 16	Partizan	90–83	Šibenka	Belgrade
	Pts: Divac 21		Pts: Slavica 31	Arena: Hala sportova Attendance: 4,000

21 February 1988 17	Zadar	83–86	Partizan	Zadar
	Pts: Komazec 26		Pts: Divac, Grbović 28	Arena: Jazine Basketball Hall; Attendance: 4,000

28 February 1988 18	Partizan	110–96	IMT	Belgrade
	Pts: Paspalj 38		Pts: Mlađan 30	Attendance: 5,000

6 March 1988 19	Bosna	107–121	Partizan	Sarajevo
	Pts: Mitrović 23		Pts: Paspalj 28	Arena: Skenderija; Attendance: 5,000

13 March 1988 20	Partizan	96–82	MZT Skopje	Belgrade
	Pts: Grbović 30		Pts: Vladičevski 27	Arena: Hala sportova Attendance: 2,000

20 March 1988 21	Budućnost	79–87	Partizan	Titograd
	Pts: Antić 22		Pts: Grbović 26	Arena: Morača; Attendance: 5,000

27 March 1988 22	Partizan	90–88	Cibona	Belgrade
	Pts: Divac 22		Pts: Petrović 41	Arena: Hala sportova Attendance: 4,500

=== Quarter-finals ===
10 April 1988 QF 1	Partizan	105–96 (Series: 1–0)	Crvena zvezda	Belgrade
	Pts: Grbović 32		Pts: Ilić 38	Arena: Hala sportova Attendance: 4,000

13 April 1988 QF 2	Crvena zvezda	90–101 (Series: 0–2)	Partizan	Belgrade
	Pts: Milićević 38		Pts: Pecarski 26	Arena: Pionir Hall; Attendance: 7,000

=== Semi-finals ===
19 April 1988 SF 1	Cibona	102–91 (Series: 1–1)	Partizan	Zagreb
	Pts: Petrović 41		Pts: Đorđević 19	Arena: Cibona Sports Centre; Attendance: 5,000

23 April 1988 SF 2	Partizan	103–90 (Series: 1–1)	Cibona	Belgrade
	Pts: Divac 26		Pts: Cvjetičanin 27	Arena: Hala sportova Attendance: 7,000

26 April 1988 SF 3	Cibona	77–83 (Series: 1–2)	Partizan	Zagreb
	Pts: Sunara 22		Pts: Divac 23	Arena: Cibona Sports Centre; Attendance: 6,000

=== Final ===
30 April 1988 F 1	Jugoplastika	101–79 (Series: 1–0)	Partizan	Split
	Pts: Rađa 23		Pts: Đorđević, Paspalj 20	Arena: Arena Gripe; Attendance: 4,000

3 May 1988 F 2	Partizan	86–80 (Series: 1–1)	Jugoplastika	Belgrade
	Pts: Divac 18		Pts: Kukoč 19	Arena: Hala sportova Attendance: 7,000

7 May 1988 F 3	Jugoplastika	88–67 (Series: 2–1)	Partizan	Split
	Pts: Sobin 28		Pts: Grbović 16	Arena: Arena Gripe; Attendance: 4,000

== Yugoslav Cup ==
=== Aranđelovac tournament ===
	Team	Pld	W	L	PD	Pts
1	Partizan	3	2	1	+12	4
2	MZT Skopje	3	2	1	+1	4
3	Smelt Olimpija	3	2	1	-13	4
4	Prvi partizan	3	0	3		0

19 June 1987 First round	Zdravlje	95–107	Partizan	Leskovac
	Pts: Mitić 26		Pts: Paspalj 42	Arena: Velika dvorana SRC Zdravlje; Attendance: 2,000

27 August 1987 Second round	Zorka	77–87	Partizan	Šabac
	Pts: Grušanović 22		Pts: Grbović 21	Arena: Zorka Hall; Attendance: 2,500

12 November 1987 Preliminary round	Partizan	97–82	Prvi partizan	Aranđelovac
	Pts: Grbović 21		Pts: Jokanović 21	Arena: Sportski centar Šumadija; Attendance: 1,500

13 November 1987 Preliminary round	Partizan	114–99	Olimpija	Aranđelovac
	Pts: Paspalj 30		Pts: Vilfan 28	Arena: Sportski centar Šumadija; Attendance: 2,000

14 November 1987 Preliminary round	Partizan	87–90	MZT Skopje	Aranđelovac
	Pts: Paspalj 36		Pts: Nastev 17	Arena: Sportski centar Šumadija; Attendance: 1,500

6 February 1988 Semi-final	Jugoplastika	75–73	Partizan	Rijeka
	Pts: Ivanović 24		Pts: Divac 18	Arena: Dvorana Mladosti; Attendance: 4,000

== European Champions Cup ==
=== Round of 16 ===
15 October 1987	Körmendi Dózsa (Hungary)	94–130	(Socialist Federal Republic of Yugoslavia) Partizan	Körmend
	Pts: Kardos 30		Pts: Grbović 30	Attendance: 3,000

22 October 1987	Partizan (Socialist Federal Republic of Yugoslavia)	101–71	(Hungary) Körmendi Dózsa	Belgrade
	Pts: Pecarski 31		Pts: Szendrei 20	Arena: Pionir Hall; Attendance: 500

=== Quarterfinal round ===
Key to colors
Top four places in the group advance to Final four

	Team	Pld	Pts	W	L	PF	PA
1.	(Socialist Federal Republic of Yugoslavia) Partizan	14	24	10	4	1290	1260
2.	(Greece) Aris	14	23	9	5	1346	1315
3.	(Italy) Tracer Milano	14	23	9	5	1304	1286
4.	(Israel) Maccabi Elite Tel Aviv	14	22	8	6	1326	1320
5.	(Spain) FC Barcelona	14	21	7	7	1367	1278
6.	(West Germany) Saturn 77 Köln	14	19	5	9	1402	1415
7.	(France) Orthez	14	18	4	10	1210	1229
8.	(Netherlands) Nashua EBBC	14	18	4	10	1299	1441

26 November 1987	Partizan (Socialist Federal Republic of Yugoslavia)	101–94	(Netherlands) Nashua Den Bosch	Belgrade
	Pts: Paspalj 43		Pts: Thompson 36	Arena: Pionir Hall; Attendance: 1,000

3 December 1987	Tracer Milano (Italy)	93–83	(Socialist Federal Republic of Yugoslavia) Partizan	Milan
	Pts: McAdoo 34		Pts: Grbović 34	Arena: Palatrussardi; Attendance: 5,000

10 December 1987	Partizan (Socialist Federal Republic of Yugoslavia)	94–89	(France) Orthez	Belgrade
	Pts: Đorđević, Paspalj 23		Pts: Hufnagel 24	Arena: Pionir Hall; Attendance: 4,000

16 December 1987	Barcelona (Spain)	84–88	(Socialist Federal Republic of Yugoslavia) Partizan	Barcelona
	Pts: San Epifanio 20		Pts: Grbović 31	Arena: Palau Blaugrana; Attendance: 5,500

7 January 1988	Partizan (Socialist Federal Republic of Yugoslavia)	101–94	(Greece) Aris	Belgrade
	Pts: Grbović 35		Pts: Galis 27	Arena: Hala sportova Attendance: 7,000

13 January 1988	Saturn 77 Köln (West Germany)	95–101	(Socialist Federal Republic of Yugoslavia) Partizan	Leverkusen
	Pts: McPherson 37		Pts: Divac 29	Attendance: 6,000

21 January 1988	Partizan (Socialist Federal Republic of Yugoslavia)	85–77	(Israel) Maccabi Tel Aviv	Belgrade
	Pts: Grbović 24		Pts: Magee 24	Arena: Hala sportova Attendance: 7,000

11 February 1988	Nashua Den Bosch (Netherlands)	85–106	(Socialist Federal Republic of Yugoslavia) Partizan	Den Bosch
	Pts: Kuipers 26		Pts: Grbović 41	Attendance: 4,000

18 February 1988	Partizan (Socialist Federal Republic of Yugoslavia)	92–85	(Italy) Tracer Milano	Belgrade
	Pts: Grbović 26		Pts: McAdoo 31	Arena: Hala sportova Attendance: 7,000

24 February 1988	Orthez (France)	70–73	(Socialist Federal Republic of Yugoslavia) Partizan	Pau
	Pts: Carter 20		Pts: Paspalj 15	Attendance: 5,500

3 March 1988	Partizan (Socialist Federal Republic of Yugoslavia)	96–90	(Spain) Barcelona	Belgrade
	Pts: Grbović 29		Pts: Norris 29	Arena: Hala sportova Attendance: 6,500

10 March 1988	Aris (Greece)	96–87	(Socialist Federal Republic of Yugoslavia) Partizan	Thessaloniki
	Pts: Galis 36		Pts: Divac 21	Attendance: 6,000

18 March 1988	Partizan (Socialist Federal Republic of Yugoslavia)	99–110	(West Germany) Saturn 77 Köln	Belgrade
	Pts: Paspalj 24		Pts: Jäckel 25	Arena: Hala sportova Attendance: 5,000

24 March 1988	Maccabi Tel Aviv (Israel)	98–84	(Socialist Federal Republic of Yugoslavia) Partizan	Tel Aviv
	Pts: Magee 29		Pts: Grbović, Divac 19	Attendance: 10,000

=== Final Four ===
==== Semifinal ====
5 April 1988	Partizan (Socialist Federal Republic of Yugoslavia)	82–87	(Israel) Maccabi Tel Aviv	Ghent
18:30	Scoring by quarter: 44–43, 38–44
	Pts: Grbović, Divac 19	Report	Pts: Magee 31	Arena: Flanders Expo; Attendance: 9,000; Referees: Lubomir Kotleba (CZE), Vicente Sanchís (SPA)

==== Third-place game ====
7 April 1988	Partizan (Socialist Federal Republic of Yugoslavia)	105–93	(Greece) Aris	Ghent
19:00	Scoring by quarter: 48–39, 57–54
	Pts: Divac 31	Report	Pts: Gallis 39	Arena: Flanders Expo; Attendance: 9,000; Referees: Lubomir Kotleba (CZE), Vicente Sanchís (SPA)
