= Luka Pavićević =

Serbian basketball player and coach

Luka Pavićević Лука Павићевић
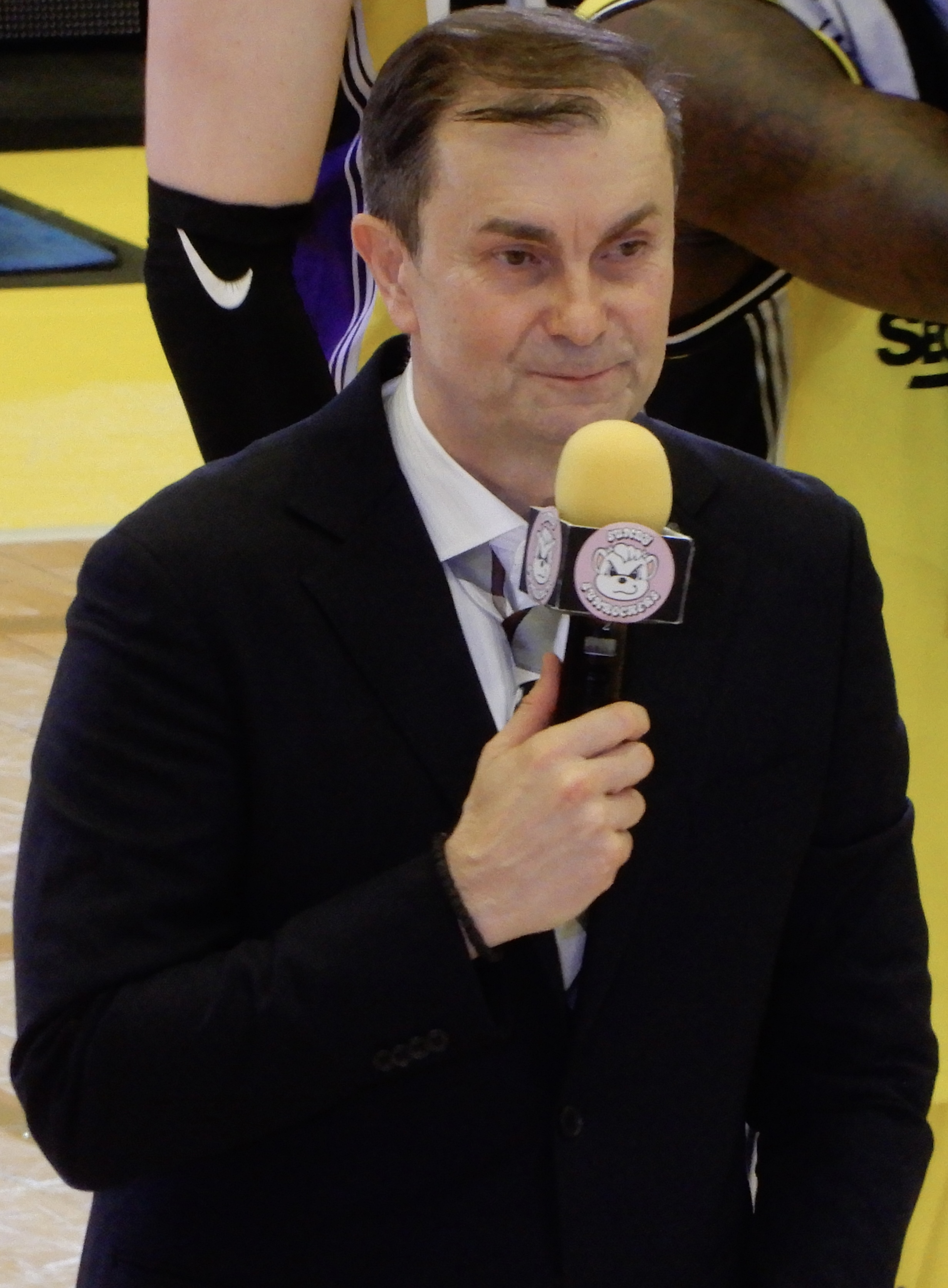
- Pavićević in 2025

Personal information
- Born: 17 June 1968 (age 58) Titograd, SR Montenegro, SFR Yugoslavia

Career information
- College: Utah (1985–1987)
- NBA draft: 1990: undrafted
- Playing career: 1982–2003
- Position: Point guard
- Number: 5, 6
- Coaching career: 2003–present

Career history

Playing
- 1982–1985: Budućnost
- 1987–1988: Cibona
- 1988–1991: Jugoplastika / Pop 84
- 1991–1992: Radnički Belgrade
- 1992–1994: Ironi Nahariya
- 1994–1995: Proleter Zrenjanin
- 1995–1996: Crvena zvezda
- 1996–1997: FMP
- 1997–1998: Beobanka
- 1998–1999: Crvena zvezda
- 1999–2000: Soproni Ászok
- 2000–2001: Espoon Honka
- 2001: Anwil Włocławek
- 2001: Rabotnički
- 2002: Besançon
- 2002–2003: Crvena zvezda

Coaching
- 2003–2004: OKK Beograd
- 2004–2005: Atlas
- 2005–2006: Hemofarm
- 2006–2007: Panionios
- 2007–2011: Alba Berlin
- 2011–2014: Chorale Roanne
- 2015–2016: Budućnost
- 2017–2022: Alvark Tokyo
- 2025: Panionios

Career highlights
- As player: 3× EuroLeague champion (1989, 1990, 1991); 3× Yugoslav League champion (1989, 1990, 1991); Finnish League champion (2001); 4× Yugoslav Cup winner (1988, 1990, 1991, 1997); Finnish Cup winner (2001); As head coach: FIBA Asia Champions Cup champion (2019); German League champion (2008); 2× Japanese League champion (2018, 2019); German Cup winner (2009); Montenegrin Cup winner (2016)
Medals
Men's basketball
Representing Yugoslavia
Goodwill Games
Gold medal – first place	1990 Seattle
Under-19 World Cup
Gold medal – first place	1987 Italy	Under-19
European Championship for Juniors
Gold medal – first place	1986 Austria	Under-18
Bronze medal – third place	1984 Sweden	Under-18
European Championship for Cadets
Gold medal – first place	1983 West Germany	Under-16
Head coach for Serbia and Montenegro/Serbia
U20 European Championship
Bronze medal – third place	2005 Russia	Under-20
Universiade
Gold medal – first place	2011 Shenzhen

Luka Pavićević (Serbian Cyrillic: Лука Павићевић; born 17 June 1968) is a Montenegrin professional basketball coach and former player who last served as the head coach for Panionios of the Greek Basketball League and the EuroCup.

A point guard, Pavićević played basketball between 1982 and 2003. During his playing days, he played for Budućnost, Cibona, Jugoplastika / Pop 84, Proleter Zrenjanin, Crvena zvezda, FMP, Beobanka, Soproni Ászok, Espoon Honka, Anwil Włocławek, Rabotnički, and Besançon. He retired as a player with Crvena zvezda in 2003. In three seasons with Jugoplastika, he won three European Champions Cup championships (1988–89, 1989–90, 1990–91), three Yugoslav League titles (1988–89, 1989–90, 1990–91), and three Yugoslav Cup tournaments.

== Early life ==
Born in Titograd, young Luka grew up in the neighbourhood of Preko Morače where he attended the Maxim Gorky Elementary School. His construction engineer father Božidar had a stint as a director of the Republički zavod za urbanizam i projektovanje (RZUP) state-owned urban planning enterprise while his mother Nedeljka worked as a dentist-orthodontist.

Inspired by a documentary called Maestro about the Yugoslav basketball star player Dragan Kićanović—produced by Yugoslav television and aired as part of its 1980 Moscow Olympics coverage—Pavićević took up streetball at age 12 via joining ballers gathering daily on the concrete court in the city's Njegošev Park. Marking himself out as a quick ball handler capable of competing against significantly older individuals, the teenager caught the eye of KK Budućnost's head coach Čedomir Đurašković who invited the youngster to join the club.

== Club career ==
=== KK Budućnost ===
Joining Budućnost in 1982, young Pavićević was immediately attached by coach Đurašković to the full squad. The fourteen-year-old point guard thus became the youngest ever player to appear in a Yugoslav top-tier league game, surpassing KK Šibenka 15-year-old shooting guard Dražen Petrović's late 1979 record.

== Coaching career ==
After retirement in 2003, Pavićević joined OKK Beograd as their new head coach. Afterwards, he coached Atlas, Hemofarm, Panionios, Alba Berlin and Chorale Roanne. In November 2015, Budućnost hired Pavićević as their new head coach. In March 2016, he parted ways with Budućnost.

In June 2017, Pavićević was named as the head coach of Alvark Tokyo of the Japanese B.League. He won two Japanese B.League titles (2017–18 and 2018–19) and FIBA Asia Champions Cup title in 2019. In June 2022, he parted ways with Alvark Tokyo.

On May 31, 2025, Pavicevic returned to Greece to coach again Panionios.

== National team coaching career ==
Pavićević was the head coach for the Serbia and Montenegro under-20 team at the 2004 FIBA Europe Championship in the Czech Republic and at the 2005 FIBA Europe Championship in Russia. His team won a bronze medal in 2005.

In August 2011, Pavićević was the head coach for the Serbia University team that won a gold medal at the Summer Universiade in Shenzhen, China.

In December 2011, the Basketball Federation of Montenegro named Pavićević the new head coach of the Montenegro national team. On 22 September 2014, he parted ways with the Basketball Federation of Montenegro as the Montenegrin team coach.

In April 2015, the Islamic Republic of Iran Basketball Federation named Pavićević the new head coach of the Iran national team. He parted ways with them later that year.

In November 2016, Pavićević was named as part of the technical committee of the Japan Basketball Association, and was named interim head coach within the month following the end of the tenure of previous head coach Kenji Hasegawa. He left head coach position in 2017.

== Career achievements and awards ==
As player:

- European Champions Cup (Euroleague) champion: 3 (with Jugoplastika: 1988–89, 1989–90, 1990–91)
- Finnish League champion: 1 (with Espoon Honka: 2000–01)
- Yugoslav League champion: 3 (with Jugoplastika: 1988–89, 1989–90, 1990–91)
- Yugoslav Cup winner: 4 (with Cibona: 1988, with Jugoplastika: 1990, 1991, with FMP Železnik: 1997)
- Finnish Cup winner: 1 (with Espoon Honka: 2001)

As head coach:

- Japanese League champion: 2 (with Alvark Tokyo: 2017–18, 2018–19)
- FIBA Asia Champions Cup champion: 1 (with Alvark Tokyo: 2019)
- German League champion: 1 (with Alba Berlin: 2007–08)
- German Cup winner: 1 (with Alba Berlin: 2009)
- Montenegrin Cup winner: 1 (with Budućnost: 2016)

== Head coaching record ==
Legend
Regular season	G	Games coached	W	Games won	L	Games lost	W–L %	Win–loss %
Playoffs	PG	Playoff games	PW	Playoff wins	PL	Playoff losses	PW–L %	Playoff win–loss %

Team	Year	G	W	L	W–L%	Finish	PG	PW	PL	PW–L%	Result
Alvark Tokyo	2017–18	60	44	16	.733	2nd in Eastern	5	5	0	1.000	Champions
Alvark Tokyo	2018–19	60	44	16	.733	3rd in Eastern	6	5	1	.833	Champions
Alvark Tokyo	2019–20	41	32	9	.780	1st in Eastern	-	-	-	–	-

== See also ==
- List of European basketball players in the United States
