= Ivica Burić =

Croatian basketball player and coach

Personal information
- Born: 5 April 1963 (age 63) Split, SR Croatia, SFR Yugoslavia
- Position: Head coach

Career history

Playing
- Jugoplastika
- Šibenka

Coaching
- Slobodna Dalmacija
- 1995–2005: Croatia (assistant)
- 1999–2000: Zadar
- Široki
- Benston Zagreb
- 2006–2007: Apollon Patras
- 2014: Jolly Šibenik
- 2018–2019: Zrinjevac 1937
- 2019: Bosco

Career highlights
- As player: EuroLeague champion (1989); 2× Yugoslav League winner (1988, 1989); As head coach: Croatian League champion (2011); 3× Croatian Cup winner (1994, 1997, 2000)

Ivica Burić (pronounced [îvitsa bûːritɕ]; born 5 April 1963) is a Croatian professional basketball coach and former player.

He is best known for winning the FIBA European Champions Cup in 1989.
