= 1988–89 KK Partizan season =

Partizan
1988–89 season
- President: Tomsilav Jeremić
- Head coach: Duško Vujošević
- Yugoslav First Basketball League: Runners-up
- Yugoslav Cup: Champion
- FIBA Korać Cup: Champion

In the 1988–89 season, Partizan Belgrade competed in the Yugoslav First Basketball League, Yugoslav Cup and FIBA Korać Cup.

== Yugoslav First Basketball League ==
	Regular season ranking 1988-89	G	V	P	PF	PS	Pt
1.	Partizan	22	16	6	2096	1879	38
2.	Jugoplastika	22	16	6	1940	1729	38
3.	Bosna	22	15	7	1911	1776	37
4.	Crvena Zvezda	22	14	8	1921	1843	36

=== Regular season ===
19 October 1988 1	Borac Čačak	85–123	Partizan	Čačak
	Pts: Šarančić 33		Pts: Paspalj 23	Arena: Borac Hall; Attendance: 2,000

27 October 1988 2	Olimpija	105–84	Partizan	Ljubljana
	Pts: Vilfan 22		Pts: Divac 21	Arena: Tivoli Hall; Attendance: 5,000

30 October 1988 3	Partizan	110–97	Vojvodina	Belgrade
	Pts: Paspalj 34		Pts: Antić, Šarić, Bilalović 18	Arena: Hala sportova Attendance: 2,500

5 November 1988 4	Bosna	74–72	Partizan	Sarajevo
	Pts: Radulović 22		Pts: Divac 23	Arena: Zetra Olympic Hall; Attendance: 10,132

3 December 1988 5	Partizan	83–85	Cibona	Belgrade
	Pts: Obradović 25		Pts: Cvjetičanin 25	Arena: Hala sportova Attendance: 5,000

10 December 1988 6	Šibenka	86–110	Partizan	Šibenik
	Pts: Slavica 20		Pts: Savović 29	Attendance: 1,500

17 December 1988 7	Partizan	94–97	Crvena zvezda	Belgrade
	Pts: Savović 27		Pts: Bogosavljev, Ilić 26	Arena: Hala sportova Attendance: 5,000

8 January 1989 8	IMT	81–97	Partizan	Belgrade
	Pts: Mlađan 18		Pts: Paspalj 29	Arena: Hala sportova Attendance: 4,000

14 January 1989 9	Partizan	97–86	Prvi partizan	Belgrade
	Pts: Divac 31		Pts: Zečević 19	Arena: Hala sportova Attendance: 2,000

22 January 1989 10	Jugoplastika	75–76	Partizan	Split
	Pts: Rađa 22		Pts: Paspalj 19	Arena: Arena Gripe; Attendance: 4,000

28 January 1989 11	Partizan	91–77	Zadar	Belgrade
	Pts: Paspalj 37		Pts: Pahlić 33	Arena: Hala sportova Attendance: 4,000

4 February 1989 12	Partizan	130–77	Borac Čačak	Belgrade
	Pts: Divac 33		Pts: Šarančić 34	Arena: Hala sportova Attendance: 2,000

7 February 1989 13	Partizan	89–76	Olimpija	Belgrade
	Pts: Paspalj 21		Pts: Zdovc 22	Arena: Hala sportova Attendance: 5,000

11 February 1989 14	Vojvodina	95–106	Partizan	Novi Sad
	Pts: Obad 27		Pts: Paspalj 37	Arena: SPC Vojvodina; Attendance: 7,000

18 February 1989 15	Partizan	89–75	Bosna	Belgrade
	Pts: Paspalj 24		Pts: Mutapčić, Mitrović 19	Arena: Hala sportova Attendance: 3,500

25 February 1989 16	Cibona	85–83	Partizan	Zagreb
	Pts: Milićević 23		Pts: Paspalj 36	Arena: Cibona Sports Centre; Attendance: 3,000

4 March 1989 17	Partizan	109–91	Šibenka	Belgrade
	Pts: Paspalj 27		Pts: Žurić 16	Arena: Hala sportova Attendance: 4,000

11 March 1989 18	Crvena zvezda	99–98	Partizan	Belgrade
	Pts: Dabić 22		Pts: Divac 23	Arena: Pionir Hall; Attendance: 6,000

25 March 1989 19	Partizan	99–95	IMT	Belgrade
	Pts: Paspalj 28		Pts: Mlađan 30	Arena: Hala sportova Attendance: 6,500

28 March 1989 20	Prvi partizan	83–89	Partizan	Titovo Užice
	Pts: Zečević 20		Pts: Divac 27	Attendance: 3,500

1 April 1989 21	Partizan	94–84	Jugoplastika	Belgrade
	Pts: Paspalj 29		Pts: Kukoč 19	Arena: Hala sportova Attendance: 5,000

8 April 1989 22	Zadar	71–73	Partizan	Zadar
	Pts: Komazec 34		Pts: Paspalj 26	Arena: Jazine Basketball Hall; Attendance: 3,000

=== Semi-finals ===
11 April 1989 SF 1	Partizan	106–92 (Series: 1–0)	Crvena zvezda	Belgrade
	Pts: Paspalj 31		Pts: Radović 20	Arena: Hala sportova Attendance: 6,000

16 April 1989 SF 2	Crvena zvezda	85–83 (Series: 1–1)	Partizan	Belgrade
	Pts: Janković 17		Pts: Divac 34	Arena: Pionir Hall; Attendance: 7,000

19 April 1989 SF 3	Partizan	100–95 (Series: 2–1)	Crvena zvezda	Belgrade
	Pts: Paspalj 22		Pts: Radović 24	Arena: Hala sportova Attendance: 7,000

=== Final ===
22 April 1989 F 1	Partizan	73–74 (Series: 0–1)	Jugoplastika	Belgrade
	Pts: Divac 22		Pts: Sobin 21	Arena: Hala sportova Attendance: 7,000

26 April 1989 F 2	Jugoplastika	75–70 (Series: 2–0)	Partizan	Split
	Pts: Ivanović 18		Pts: Divac 22	Arena: Arena Gripe; Attendance: 7,000

27 April 1989 F 3	Jugoplastika	20–0 (Series: 3–0)	Partizan	Split

== Yugoslav Cup ==
11 October 1988 Round of 64	Mladost Dalia	79–114	Partizan	Belgrade
	Pts: Banjanin 19		Pts: Savović 31

12 October 1988 Round of 32	Železničar Čačak	78–111	Partizan	Čačak
	Pts: Bukumirović 12		Pts: Nakić 21	Arena: Borac Hall; Attendance: 1,200

16 October 1988 Round of 16	Čelik	92–117	Partizan	Borovo
	Pts: Savić 23		Pts: Nakić 27	Arena: Borovo Sports Hall; Attendance: 1,000

16 October 1988 Quarter-final	Partizan	91–77	Bosna	Borovo
	Pts: Paspalj 24		Pts: Mutapčić 21	Arena: Borovo Sports Hall; Attendance: 1,500

18 March 1989 Semi-final	Partizan	103–79	Cibona	Maribor
	Pts: Paspalj 27		Pts: Milićević 27	Arena: Tabor Hall; Attendance: 4,000

19 March 1989 Final	Partizan	87–74	Jugoplastika	Maribor
	Pts: Divac 26		Pts: Kukoč, Rađa 19	Arena: Tabor Hall; Attendance: 4,000

== Korać Cup ==
=== Round of 32 ===
2 November 1988	Levski Sofia (Bulgaria)	96–90	(Socialist Federal Republic of Yugoslavia) Partizan	Sofia
	Pts: Mladenov 30		Pts: Divac, Paspalj 19	Attendance: 1,500

9 November 1988	Partizan (Socialist Federal Republic of Yugoslavia)	128–79	(Bulgaria) Levski Sofia	Belgrade
	Pts: Paspalj 29		Pts: Mladenov 20	Arena: Hala sportova Attendance: 800

=== Round of 16 ===
==== Group A ====
	Team	Pld	Pts	W	L	PF	PA	PD
1.	(Socialist Federal Republic of Yugoslavia) Partizan	6	12	6	0	536	498	+38
2.	(Italy) Divarese Varese	6	9	3	3	504	480	+24
3.	(Belgium) Assubel Mariembourg	6	8	2	4	536	575	−39
4.	(Spain) Estudiantes Bosé	6	7	1	5	505	528	−13

7 December 1988	Partizan (Socialist Federal Republic of Yugoslavia)	75–71	(Italy) Divarese Varese	Belgrade
	Pts: Paspalj 18		Pts: Pittman 22	Arena: Hala sportova Attendance: 4,000

14 December 1988	Partizan (Socialist Federal Republic of Yugoslavia)	98–91	(Belgium) Assubel Mariembourg	Belgrade
	Pts: Paspalj 22		Pts: Wiley, Williams 26

11 January 1989	Estudiantes (Spain)	66–76	(Socialist Federal Republic of Yugoslavia) Partizan	Madrid
	Pts: Pinone 26		Pts: Divac, Paspalj 16	Attendance: 3,000

18 January 1989	Divarese Varese (Italy)	75–77	(Socialist Federal Republic of Yugoslavia) Partizan	Varese
	Pts: Vescovi 29		Pts: Paspalj 35	Attendance: 5,500

25 January 1989	Assubel Mariembourg (Belgium)	102–108	(Socialist Federal Republic of Yugoslavia) Partizan	Couvin
	Pts: Wiley 41		Pts: Đorđević 26	Attendance: 2,000

1 February 1989	Partizan (Socialist Federal Republic of Yugoslavia)	102–93	(Spain) Estudiantes	Belgrade
	Pts: Paspalj 18		Pts: Pinone 26	Arena: Hala sportova Attendance: 1,500

=== Semifinal ===
15 February 1989	Partizan (Socialist Federal Republic of Yugoslavia)	75–63	(Socialist Federal Republic of Yugoslavia) Zadar	Belgrade
	Pts: Paspalj 24		Pts: Komazec 17	Arena: Hala sportova Attendance: 4,000

22 February 1989	Zadar (Socialist Federal Republic of Yugoslavia)	84–88	(Socialist Federal Republic of Yugoslavia) Partizan	Zadar
	Pts: Šarić 25		Pts: Divac 22	Arena: Jazine Basketball Hall; Attendance: 5,000

=== Final ===
16 March 1989	Wiwa Cantù (Italy)	89–76	(Socialist Federal Republic of Yugoslavia) Partizan	Cantù
	Pts: Benson 24		Pts: Divac 28	Attendance: 6,000

22 March 1989	Partizan (Socialist Federal Republic of Yugoslavia)	101–82	(Italy) Wiwa Cantù	Belgrade
	Pts: Divac 30		Pts: Riva 36	Arena: Hala sportova Attendance: 7,000
