= 1989–90 FIBA European Champions Cup =

- League: FIBA European Champions Cup
- Sport: Basketball

Regular Season

Final Four
- Champions: (Socialist Federal Republic of Yugoslavia) Jugoplastika (2nd title)
- Runners-up: (Spain) FC Barcelona Banca Catalana
- Final Four MVP: (Socialist Federal Republic of Yugoslavia) Toni Kukoč (Jugoplastika)

FIBA European Champions Cup seasons
- ← 1988–89 1990–91 →

The 1989–90 FIBA European Champions Cup was the 33rd season of the European top-tier level professional FIBA European Champions Cup (now called EuroLeague). It was won by Jugoplastika, after they beat FC Barcelona Banca Catalana 72–67. It was the club's second title overall. The culminating 1990 EuroLeague Final Four was held at Pabellón Príncipe Felipe, Zaragoza, Spain, on 17–19 April 1990. Toni Kukoč was named Final Four MVP.

== Competition system ==
- 27 teams (European national domestic league champions only), playing in a tournament system, played knock-out rounds on a home and away basis. The aggregate score of both games decided the winner.
- The eight remaining teams after the knock-out rounds entered a 1/4 Final Group Stage, which was played as a round-robin. The final standing was based on individual wins and defeats. In the case of a tie between two or more teams after the group stage, the following criteria were used to decide the final classification: 1) number of wins in one-to-one games between the teams; 2) basket average between the teams; 3) general basket average within the group.
- The top four teams after the 1/4 Final Group Stage qualified for the Final Stage (Final Four), which was played at a predetermined venue.

== First round ==
Team 1	Agg.	Team 2	1st leg	2nd leg
Commodore Den Helder (Netherlands)	176-174	(West Germany) Steiner Bayreuth	97–75	79–97
Partizani Tirana (Albania)	132-202	(Belgium) Maes Pils	68–89	64–113
Budivelnyk Kyiv (Soviet Union)	228-192	(Hungary) Csepel	131–98	97–94
Eczacıbaşı (Turkey)	140-185	(Poland) Lech Poznań	61–100	79–85
Bracknell Tigers (England)	250-196	(Iceland) Keflavík	144–105	106–91
Benfica (Portugal)	172-214	(Italy) Philips Milano	99–112	73–92
NMKY Helsinki (Finland)	177-194	(Switzerland) Pully	87–90	90–104
Täby (Sweden)	144-166	(Czechoslovakia) Baník Cigel' Prievidza	83–71	61–95
Keravnos (Cyprus)	162-189	(Bulgaria) Balkan Botevgrad	87–105	75–84
Union Sportive Hiefenech (Luxembourg)	182-187	(Austria) Klosterneuburg	81–89	101–98
BMS (Denmark)	121-160	(Scotland) MIM Livingston	62–74	59–86

== Round of 16 ==
Team 1	Agg.	Team 2	1st leg	2nd leg
Commodore Den Helder (Netherlands)	169-154	(Belgium) Maes Pils	99–70	70–84
Budivelnyk Kyiv (Soviet Union)	188-189	(Poland) Lech Poznań	104–88	84–101
Bracknell Tigers (England)	198-241	(Italy) Philips Milano	95–115	103–126
Pully (Switzerland)	197-242	(France) Limoges CSP	95–115	102–127
Baník Cigel' Prievidza (Czechoslovakia)	145-178	(Spain) FC Barcelona Banca Catalana	74–85	71–93
Balkan Botevgrad (Bulgaria)	179-226	(Greece) Aris	91–107	88–119
Klosterneuburg (Austria)	146-189	(Israel) Maccabi Elite Tel Aviv	84–103	62–86
MIM Livingston (Scotland)	149-219	(Socialist Federal Republic of Yugoslavia) Jugoplastika	84–97	65–122

== Quarterfinal round ==
Key to colors
Top four places in the group advance to Final four

	Team	Pld	Pts	W	L	PF	PA
1.	(Spain) FC Barcelona Banca Catalana	14	26	12	2	1291	1084
2.	(Socialist Federal Republic of Yugoslavia) Jugoplastika	14	25	11	3	1277	1114
3.	(France) Limoges CSP	14	24	10	4	1320	1217
4.	(Greece) Aris	14	22	8	6	1296	1224
5.	(Italy) Philips Milano	14	21	7	7	1271	1279
6.	(Israel) Maccabi Elite Tel Aviv	14	20	6	8	1185	1241
7.	(Netherlands) Commodore Den Helder	14	16	2	12	1147	1291
8.	(Poland) Lech Poznań	14	14	0	14	1147	1484

== Final four ==
=== Semifinals ===
April 17, Pabellón Príncipe Felipe, Zaragoza

Team 1	Score	Team 2
FC Barcelona Banca Catalana (Spain)	104–83	(Greece) Aris
Jugoplastika (Socialist Federal Republic of Yugoslavia)	101–83	(France) Limoges CSP

=== 3rd place game ===
April 19, Pabellón Príncipe Felipe, Zaragoza

Team 1	Score	Team 2
Limoges CSP (France)	103–91	(Greece) Aris

=== Final ===
April 19, Pabellón Príncipe Felipe, Zaragoza

Team 1	Score	Team 2
FC Barcelona Banca Catalana (Spain)	67–72	(Socialist Federal Republic of Yugoslavia) Jugoplastika

1989–90 FIBA European Champions Cup
Champions

Jugoplastika
2nd Title

=== Final standings ===
	Team
	(Socialist Federal Republic of Yugoslavia) Jugoplastika
2nd place, silver medalist(s)	(Spain) FC Barcelona Banca Catalana
3rd place, bronze medalist(s)	(France) Limoges CSP
	(Greece) Aris

== Awards ==
=== FIBA European Champions Cup Final Four MVP ===
- (Socialist Federal Republic of Yugoslavia) Toni Kukoč ( (Socialist Federal Republic of Yugoslavia) Jugoplastika)

=== FIBA European Champions Cup Finals Top Scorer ===
- (Socialist Federal Republic of Yugoslavia) Toni Kukoč ( (Socialist Federal Republic of Yugoslavia) Jugoplastika)

== Winning roster ==
- (Socialist Federal Republic of Yugoslavia) Zoran Sretenović (PG)
- (Socialist Federal Republic of Yugoslavia) Velimir Perasović (G)
- (Socialist Federal Republic of Yugoslavia) Luka Pavićević (G)
- (Socialist Federal Republic of Yugoslavia) Toni Kukoc (F)
- (Socialist Federal Republic of Yugoslavia) Goran Sobin (C)
- (Socialist Federal Republic of Yugoslavia) Velibor Radović (C)
- (Socialist Federal Republic of Yugoslavia) Paško Tomić
- (Socialist Federal Republic of Yugoslavia) Petar Naumoski (G)
- (Socialist Federal Republic of Yugoslavia) Žan Tabak (PF)
- (Socialist Federal Republic of Yugoslavia) Duško Ivanović (G)
- (Socialist Federal Republic of Yugoslavia) Zoran Savić (C)
- (Socialist Federal Republic of Yugoslavia) Dino Rađa (C)
- (Socialist Federal Republic of Yugoslavia) Aramis Naglić (PF)
- (Socialist Federal Republic of Yugoslavia) Teo Čizmić
- Coach: (Socialist Federal Republic of Yugoslavia) (PF) Božidar Maljković
