= 2012–13 Euroleague Regular Season Group D =

Standings and Results for Group D of the Regular Season phase of the 2012–13 Euroleague basketball tournament.

== Standings ==
Pos	Team	Pld	W	L	PF	PA	PD	Qualification
1	(Spain) FC Barcelona Regal	10	9 (Note: Tiebreaker: 1–1 (+18).)	1	774	636	+138	Advance to Top 16
2	(Russia) CSKA Moscow	10	9 (Note: Tiebreaker: 1–1 (−18).)	1	783	709	+74	Advance to Top 16
3	(Turkey) Beşiktaş	10	5	5	699	749	−50	Advance to Top 16
4	(Germany) Brose Baskets	10	3	7	740	807	−67	Advance to Top 16
5	(Lithuania) Lietuvos rytas	10	2 (Note: Tiebreaker: 1–1 (+7).)	8	670	724	−54	
6	(Serbia) Partizan	10	2 (Note: Tiebreaker: 1–1 (−7).)	8	731	772	−41	

Source: Euroleague

== Fixtures – results ==
All times given below are in Central European Time.

=== Game 1 ===
11 October 2012
18:00

Report

CSKA Moscow (Russia)	75–73	(Lithuania) Lietuvos Rytas
Scoring by quarter: 20–23, 26–14, 8–15, 21–21
Pts: Weems 14; Rebs: Krstić 7 Asts: Teodosić, Micov 3		Pts: Seibutis 19; Rebs: Seibutis 6 Asts: Blūms 6

Megasport Arena, Moscow
Attendance: 8,896
Referees: Christos Christodoulou (GRE), Matej Boltauzer (SLO), Petar Obradovic (BIH)

12 October 2012
18:30

Report

FC Barcelona Regal (Spain)	72–60	(Germany) Brose
Scoring by quarter: 26–9, 17–17, 21–18, 8–16
Pts: Tomić, Mickeal 12; Rebs: Tomić 9 Asts: Tomić 4		Pts: Nachbar 20; Rebs: Zirbes 6 Asts: Gipson 5

Palau Blaugrana, Barcelona
Attendance: 4,961
Referees: Recep Ankarali (TUR), Jakub Zamojski (POL), Luis Lopes (POR)

12 October 2012
19:00

Report

Beşiktaş (Turkey)	81–65	(Serbia) Partizan
Scoring by quarter: 19–14, 20–16, 22–23, 20–12
Pts: Christopher 25; Rebs: Falker 5 Asts: Güler 4		Pts: Lučić 18; Rebs: Milosavljević, Gagić 6 Asts: Westermann 3

Abdi İpekçi Arena, Istanbul
Attendance: 6,100
Referees: Borys Ryzhyk (UKR), Apostolos Kalpakas (SWE), Oscar Perea (ESP)

=== Game 2 ===
18 October 2012
18:30

Report

Lietuvos Rytas (Lithuania)	49–67	(Spain) FC Barcelona Regal
Scoring by quarter: 8–13, 17–14, 11–20, 13–20
Pts: Radošević 11; Rebs: Katelynas 9 Asts: Seibutis 6		Pts: Navarro 13; Rebs: Tomić, Wallace 6 Asts: Huertas, Navarro 4

Siemens Arena, Vilnius
Attendance: 4,900
Referees: Luigi Lamonica (ITA), Emin Mogulkoc (TUR), Petri Mantyla (FIN)

18 October 2012
19:00

Report

Brose (Germany)	71–86	(Turkey) Beşiktaş
Scoring by quarter: 19–24, 12–23, 11–20, 29–19
Pts: Gavel 21; Rebs: Zirbes 7 Asts: Gipson, Goldsberry 3		Pts: Jerrells 27; Rebs: Güler 7 Asts: Açık 5

Stechert Arena, Bamberg
Attendance: 6,800
Referees: Sreten Radovic (CRO), Miguel Perez Perez (ESP), Damir Javor (SLO)

18 October 2012
20:45

Report

Partizan (Serbia)	71–76 (OT)	(Russia) CSKA Moscow
Scoring by quarter: 13–14, 18–25, 15–10, 16–13, Overtime: 9–14
Pts: Bogdanović 16; Rebs: Musli 10; Asts: Westermann 4		Pts: Weems 30; Rebs: Khryapa 8 Asts: Khryapa 3

Pionir Hall, Belgrade
Attendance: 6,500
Referees: Juan Carlos Arteaga (ESP), Fernando Rocha (POR), Ioannis Foufis (GRE)

=== Game 3 ===
25 October 2012
18:15

Report

CSKA Moscow (Russia)	76–67	(Germany) Brose
Scoring by quarter: 25–20, 11–15, 15–18, 25–14
Pts: Weems 17; Rebs: Khryapa 10; Asts: Khryapa 3		Pts: Nachbar 21; Rebs: Nachbar 5 Asts: Gavel 4

Megasport Arena, Moscow
Attendance: 6,973
Referees: Sasa Pukl (SLO), Robert Vyklicky (CZE), Panagiotis Anastopoulos (GRE)

25 October 2012
18:30

Report

Lietuvos Rytas (Lithuania)	69–61	(Serbia) Partizan
Scoring by quarter: 23–20, 17–11, 15–17, 14–13
Pts: Samardžiski, Seibutis 14; Rebs: Ivanov 6 Asts: Seibutis 3		Pts: Lučić 17; Rebs: Gordon 7 Asts: Thomas, Westermann 2

Siemens Arena, Vilnius
Attendance: 4,250
Referees: Miguel Perez Perez (ESP), Eddie Viator (FRA), Tomas Trawicki (POL)

25 October 2012
20:45

Report

FC Barcelona Regal (Spain)	72–60	(Turkey) Beşiktaş
Scoring by quarter: 20–18, 16–16, 17–12, 19–14
Pts: Jawai 14; Rebs: Jawai 8 Asts: Ingles 3		Pts: Jerrells 18; Rebs: Özer 5 Asts: Jerrells, Açık 3

Palau Blaugrana, Barcelona
Attendance: 4,295
Referees: Milivoje Jovcic (SRB), Spiros Gkontas (GRE), Tomas Jasevicius (LTU)

=== Game 4 ===
1 November 2012
20:45

Report

FC Barcelona Regal (Spain)	85–82	(Serbia) Partizan
Scoring by quarter: 23–15, 14–22, 30–18, 18–27
Pts: Huertas 24; Rebs: Three players 5 Asts: Huertas 9		Pts: Bertans 17; Rebs: Gordon 7 Asts: Thomas 4

Palau Blaugrana, Barcelona
Attendance: 5,713
Referees: Tolga Sahin (ITA), Elias Koromilas (GRE), Renaud Geller (BEL)

2 November 2012
20:00

Report

Beşiktaş (Turkey)	58–85	(Russia) CSKA Moscow
Scoring by quarter: 18–22, 14–22, 9–24, 17–17
Pts: Güler 12; Rebs: Vidmar 7 Asts: Markota 3		Pts: Krstić, Weems 18; Rebs: Vorontsevich 9 Asts: Teodosić, Ponkrashov 6

Abdi İpekçi Arena, Istanbul
Attendance: 10,040
Referees: Ilija Belosevic (SRB), Milija Vojinovic (SRB), Marcin Kowalski (POL)

2 November 2012
20:20

Report

Brose (Germany)	84–78	(Lithuania) Lietuvos Rytas
Scoring by quarter: 20–21, 25–14, 17–29, 22–14
Pts: Nachbar, Gavel 22; Rebs: Zirbes 7 Asts: Tadda 4		Pts: Seibutis 24; Rebs: Three players 4 Asts: Nedović 2

Stechert Arena, Bamberg
Attendance: 6,800
Referees: Grzegorz Ziemblicki (POL), Sinisa Herceg (CRO), Igor Dragojevic (MNE)

=== Game 5 ===
8 November 2012
17:00

Report

CSKA Moscow (Russia)	60–81	(Spain) FC Barcelona Regal
Scoring by quarter: 19–17, 16–21, 13–25, 12–18
Pts: Krstić 18; Rebs: Khryapa 6 Asts: Khryapa 4		Pts: Navarro 21; Rebs: Jawai 7 Asts: Ingles 4

CSKA Universal Sports Hall, Moscow
Attendance: 5,238
Referees: Carl Jungebrand (FIN), Eddie Viator (FRA), Damir Javor (SLO)

8 November 2012
18:30

Report

Lietuvos Rytas (Lithuania)	67–73	(Turkey) Beşiktaş
Scoring by quarter: 20–17, 13–16, 15–16, 19–24
Pts: Babrauskas 14; Rebs: Ivanov 9 Asts: Four players 2		Pts: Jerrells 25; Rebs: Falker 9 Asts: Açık, Jerrells 3

Siemens Arena, Vilnius
Attendance: 4,900
Referees: Juan Carlos Arteaga (ESP), Marek Cmikiewicz (POL), Regis Bardera (FRA)

9 November 2012
20:45

Report

Partizan (Serbia)	72–77	(Germany) Brose
Scoring by quarter: 16–16, 25–17, 21–22, 10–22
Pts: Lučić, Gagić 17; Rebs: Gordon 8 Asts: Westermann 3		Pts: Nachbar 19; Rebs: Ford 9 Asts: Gavel 4

Pionir Hall, Belgrade
Attendance: 7,500
Referees: Paolo Taurino (ITA), Nicola Maestre (FRA), Marcin Kowalski (POL)

=== Game 6 ===
15 November 2012
19:30

Report

Lietuvos Rytas (Lithuania)	62–71	(Russia) CSKA Moscow
Scoring by quarter: 16–14, 16–19, 14–20, 16–18
Pts: Radošević 17; Rebs: Three players Asts: Three players 2		Pts: Weems 19; Rebs: Khryapa 9 Asts: Khryapa 5

Siemens Arena, Vilnius
Attendance: 4,950
Referees: Dubravko Muhvic (CRO), Robert Lottermoser (GER), Elias Koromilas (GRE)

15 November 2012
19:00

Report

Brose (Germany)	66–86	(Spain) FC Barcelona Regal
Scoring by quarter: 22–23, 20–24, 11–17, 13–22
Pts: Nachbar 18; Rebs: Nachbar, Zirbes 8 Asts: Nachbar 4		Pts: Mickeal 17; Rebs: Mickeal 7 Asts: Four players 3

Stechert Arena, Bamberg
Attendance: 6,800
Referees: Borys Ryzhyk (UKR), Petri Mantyla (FIN), Sergio Silva (POR)

15 November 2012
20:45

Report

Partizan (Serbia)	87–72	(Turkey) Beşiktaş
Scoring by quarter: 24–19, 27–24, 19–22, 17–7
Pts: Milosavljevic 17; Rebs: Gordon 9 Asts: Westermann 8		Pts: Jerrells 20; Rebs: Vidmar 10; Asts: Vidmar, Cetin 3

Pionir Hall, Belgrade
Attendance: 6,500
Referees: Luigi Lamonica (ITA), Gianluca Mattioli (ITA), Sergiy Zashchuck (UKR)

=== Game 7 ===
22 November 2012
20:00

Report

CSKA Moscow (Russia)	78–61	(Serbia) Partizan
Scoring by quarter: 23–22, 25–14, 13–12, 17–13
Pts: Weems 14; Rebs: Kaun 6 Asts: Teodosić 11		Pts: Lučić, Milosavljević 12; Rebs: Musli 6 Asts: Musli 3

Megasport Arena, Moscow
Attendance: 8,162
Referees: Marek Cmikiewicz (POL), Rustu Nuran (TUR), Omer Esteron (ISR)

22 November 2012
20:45

Report

FC Barcelona Regal (Spain)	90–66	(Lithuania) Lietuvos Rytas
Scoring by quarter: 27–18, 15–27, 26–15, 22–6
Pts: Navarro 24; Rebs: Jawai 6 Asts: Sada 7		Pts: Radošević 14; Rebs: Samardžiski, Katelynas 4 Asts: Katelynas, Blūms 2

Palau Blaugrana, Barcelona
Attendance: 4,474
Referees: Ilija Belosevic (SRB), Carmelo Paternico (ITA), Luis Lopes (POR)

23 November 2012
20:00

Report

Beşiktaş (Turkey)	83–72	(Germany) Brose
Scoring by quarter: 18–18, 18–24, 26–12, 21–18
Pts: Christopher 20; Rebs: Markota, Christopher 7 Asts: Jerrells 6		Pts: Gavel 21; Rebs: Tadda 8 Asts: Goldsberry 4

Abdi İpekçi Arena, Istanbul
Attendance: 5,150
Referees: Carl Jungebrand (FIN), Roberto Chiari (ITA), Ioannis Foufis (GRE)

=== Game 8 ===
29 November 2012
20:45

Report

Brose (Germany)	89–97	(Russia) CSKA Moscow
Scoring by quarter: 24–29, 15–21, 25–17, 25–30
Pts: Jacobsen 18; Rebs: Zirbes 6 Asts: Gipson 6		Pts: Christmas 21; Rebs: Khryapa 7 Asts: Teodosić 9

Stechert Arena, Bamberg
Attendance: 6,800
Referees: Milivoje Jovcic (SRB), Matej Boltauzer (SLO), Marius Ciulin (ROM)

29 November 2012
20:45

Report

Partizan (Serbia)	75–74	(Lithuania) Lietuvos Rytas
Scoring by quarter: 18–11, 21–22, 20–18, 16–23
Pts: Bertans 14; Rebs: Lučić, Gordon 8 Asts: Westermann 5		Pts: Nedović 16; Rebs: Katelynas, Ivanov 5 Asts: Radošević 4

Pionir Hall, Belgrade
Attendance: 7,500
Referees: José Martín (ESP), Robert Vyklicky (CZE), Panagiotis Anastopoulos (GRE)

30 November 2012
19:00

Report

Beşiktaş (Turkey)	48–78	(Spain) FC Barcelona Regal
Scoring by quarter: 14–18, 10–21, 14–23, 10–16
Pts: Vidmar 18; Rebs: Vidmar 6 Asts: Jerrells 2		Pts: Ingles 22; Rebs: Wallace 8 Asts: Jasikevičius 5

Abdi İpekçi Arena, Istanbul
Attendance: 9,150
Referees: Christos Christodoulou (GRE), Sinisa Herceg (CRO), Joseph Bissang (FRA)

=== Game 9 ===
6 December 2012
17:00

Report

CSKA Moscow (Russia)	87–72	(Turkey) Beşiktaş
Scoring by quarter: 24–28, 22–23, 21–10, 20–11
Pts: Weems 20; Rebs: Khryapa 8 Asts: Teodosić 11		Pts: Christopher 14; Rebs: Güler, Markota 6 Asts: Jerrells 6

Megasport Arena, Moscow
Attendance: 6,472
Referees: José Martín (ESP), Jose Ramon Garcia Ortiz (ESP), Zdravko Rutesic (MNE)

6 December 2012
20:45

Report

Partizan (Serbia)	67–68 (OT)	(Spain) FC Barcelona Regal
Scoring by quarter: 14–13, 16–12, 14–18, 14–15, Overtime: 9–10
Pts: Milosavljevic 14; Rebs: Gordon 9 Asts: Westermann 5		Pts: Navarro 10; Rebs: Wallace 9 Asts: Jasikevičius, Wallace 2

Pionir Hall, Belgrade
Attendance: 7,500
Referees: Robert Lottermoser (GER), Jakub Zamojski (POL), Anastasios Piloidis (GRE)

7 December 2012
18:30

Report

Lietuvos Rytas (Lithuania)	67–62	(Germany) Brose
Scoring by quarter: 15–15, 20–13, 15–15, 17–19
Pts: Seibutis 19; Rebs: Seibutis 10; Asts: Ivanov 2		Pts: Nachbar, Jacobsen 12; Rebs: Nachbar 6 Asts: Goldsberry 4

Siemens Arena, Vilnius
Attendance: 4,800
Referees: Christos Christodoulou (GRE), Tolga Sahin (ITA), Oskars Lucis (LAT)

=== Game 10 ===
13 November 2012
20:45

Report

FC Barcelona Regal (Spain)	75–78	(Russia) CSKA Moscow
Scoring by quarter: 19–24, 28–17, 11–14, 17–23
Pts: Navarro 17; Rebs: Sada 4 Asts: Navarro 3		Pts: Krstić 15; Rebs: Three players 5 Asts: Three players 3

Palau Blaugrana, Barcelona
Attendance: 5,026
Referees: Luigi Lamonica (ITA), Nicola Maestre (FRA), Olegs Latisevs (LAT)

13 November 2012
20:45

Report

Beşiktaş (Turkey)	66–65	(Lithuania) Lietuvos Rytas
Scoring by quarter: 15–19, 18–20, 18–15, 15–11
Pts: Ewing 14; Rebs: Vidmar 6 Asts: Ewing 4		Pts: Ivanov 16; Rebs: Radošević 10; Asts: Nedović 7

Abdi İpekçi Arena, Istanbul
Attendance: 3,100
Referees: Juan Carlos Garcia Gonzalez (ESP), Spiros Gkontas (GRE), Oscar Perea (ESP)

13 November 2012
20:45

Report

Brose (Germany)	92–90 (OT)	(Serbia) Partizan
Scoring by quarter: 25–13, 22–22, 21–27, 12–18, Overtime: 12–10
Pts: Nachbar 23; Rebs: Jacobsen, Zirbes 6 Asts: Jacobsen 6		Pts: Lučić 19; Rebs: Gordon 15; Asts: Westermann 4

Stechert Arena, Bamberg
Attendance: 6,800
Referees: Guerrino Cerebuch (ITA), Vicente Bulto (ESP), Dani Hierrezuelo (ESP)
