= Patrick Christopher =

American basketball player (born 1988)

Personal information
- Born: June 3, 1988 (age 38) Compton, California, U.S.
- Listed height: 6 ft 5 in (1.96 m)
- Listed weight: 209 lb (95 kg)

Career information
- High school: Mayfair (Lakewood, California); Dominguez (Compton, California)
- College: California (2006–2010)
- NBA draft: 2010: undrafted
- Playing career: 2010–2016
- Position: Shooting guard / small forward
- Number: 19

Career history
- 2010–2011: Antalya BB
- 2011–2012: Cholet Basket
- 2012–2013: Beşiktaş
- 2013–2014: Iowa Energy
- 2014–2015: Utah Jazz
- 2015–2016: Iowa Energy

Career highlights
- NBA D-League All-Defensive Second Team (2014); Turkish Presidential Cup winner (2012); 2× First-team All-Pac-10 (2009, 2010)
- Stats at NBA.com
- Stats at Basketball Reference

James Patrick Christopher (born June 3, 1988) is an American former professional basketball player. He played college basketball for the California Golden Bears and was a two-time first-team all-conference selection in the Pac-10 (now known as the Pac-12). He briefly played in the National Basketball Association (NBA) for the Utah Jazz.

== High school career ==
Christopher was born in Artesia, California. He attended Mayfair High School in Lakewood, California, his freshman through junior years. He averaged 19.8 points per game as a junior in 2004–05, helping his team to a 19–10 record.

For his senior year, Christopher moved to Dominguez High School in Compton, California, where he averaged 21 points, 9 rebounds and 3 assists per game, earning first-team All-CIF honors for the 2005–06 season. He was rated the No. 44 overall recruit and No. 6 player in the state of California by Rivals.com and was considered the No. 17 shooting guard in the country by Scout.com.

== College career ==
After graduating high school, Christopher attended the University of California, Berkeley, where he averaged 15.6 points, 5.4 rebounds and 2 assists as a senior for the Golden Bears. He was named first-team All-Pac-10 after both his junior and senior seasons and finished his Cal career ranked third in Golden Bear history in scoring with 1,700 points and fourth in three-pointers made with 164.

== Professional career ==
After going undrafted in the 2010 NBA draft, Christopher played for the Detroit Pistons in the NBA Summer League. He later moved to Turkey for the 2010–11 season to play for Antalya BB. In 28 games, he averaged 15.9 points, 4.4 rebounds, 1.7 assists and 1.3 steals per game.

In December 2011, Christopher signed with Cholet Basket of the French LNB Pro A. In 26 games during the 2011–12 season, he averaged 12.8 points and 2.4 rebounds per game.

In July 2012, Christopher joined the Sacramento Kings for the NBA Summer League, but did not play. He later returned to Turkey for the 2012–13 season to play for Beşiktaş. He averaged 11.0 points, 2.8 rebounds, 1.1 assists in 26 Turkish League games and 8.4 points, 2.3 rebounds and 1.0 assists in 24 EuroLeague games.

On September 27, 2013, Christopher signed with the Chicago Bulls. He was waived by Bulls on October 2 and joined the Iowa Energy of the NBA D-League on November 1, 2013. In 52 games during the 2013–14 season, he averaged 14.8 points, 4.0 rebounds and 2.2 assists per game. He was named to the NBA D-League All-Defensive Second Team.

On September 25, 2014, Christopher signed with the Memphis Grizzlies. He was waived by Grizzlies on October 25 and was reacquired by the Iowa Energy on October 31, 2014. On December 10, 2014, he signed with the Utah Jazz. On January 6, 2015, he was waived by the Jazz after sustaining a knee injury. He appeared in four games (starting one) while averaging 1.5 points and 1.5 rebounds in 7.3 minutes per game.

On September 14, 2015, Christopher re-signed with the Memphis Grizzlies, only to be waived by the team on September 23. On October 31, 2015, he was reacquired by the Iowa Energy. He was deactivated by the Energy on November 11, then reactivated on February 16, 2016. In 20 games to finish the 2015–16 season, he averaged 15.3 points, 2.7 rebounds and 2.5 assists per game.

In July 2016, Christopher played for the NBA D-League Select Team in the NBA Summer League.

On September 11, 2016, Christopher signed with Eisbären Bremerhaven of the German Basketball Bundesliga. However, after failing to pass the physicals due to a knee problem, the team voided his contract on September 22, 2016.

== Personal life ==
Christopher is the son of Patricia and Laron Christopher. He is the brother of current Sioux Falls Skyforce forward Josh Christopher. He is the godbrother of former NBA player Tayshaun Prince.

In 2019, Christopher founded Sloan and Bennett, a luxury menswear brand named after the cross streets of his childhood home in Compton, California.

== Career statistics ==
Legend
GP	Games played	GS	Games started	MPG	Minutes per game
FG%	Field goal percentage	3P%	3-point field goal percentage	FT%	Free throw percentage
RPG	Rebounds per game	APG	Assists per game	SPG	Steals per game
BPG	Blocks per game	PPG	Points per game	**Bold**	Career high

=== NBA ===
==== Regular season ====
Year	Team	GP	GS	MPG	FG%	3P%	FT%	RPG	APG	SPG	BPG	PPG
2014–15	Utah	4	0	7.3	.250	.000	–	1.5	.0	.3	.0	1.5
