= Velimir Perasović =

Croatian basketball player

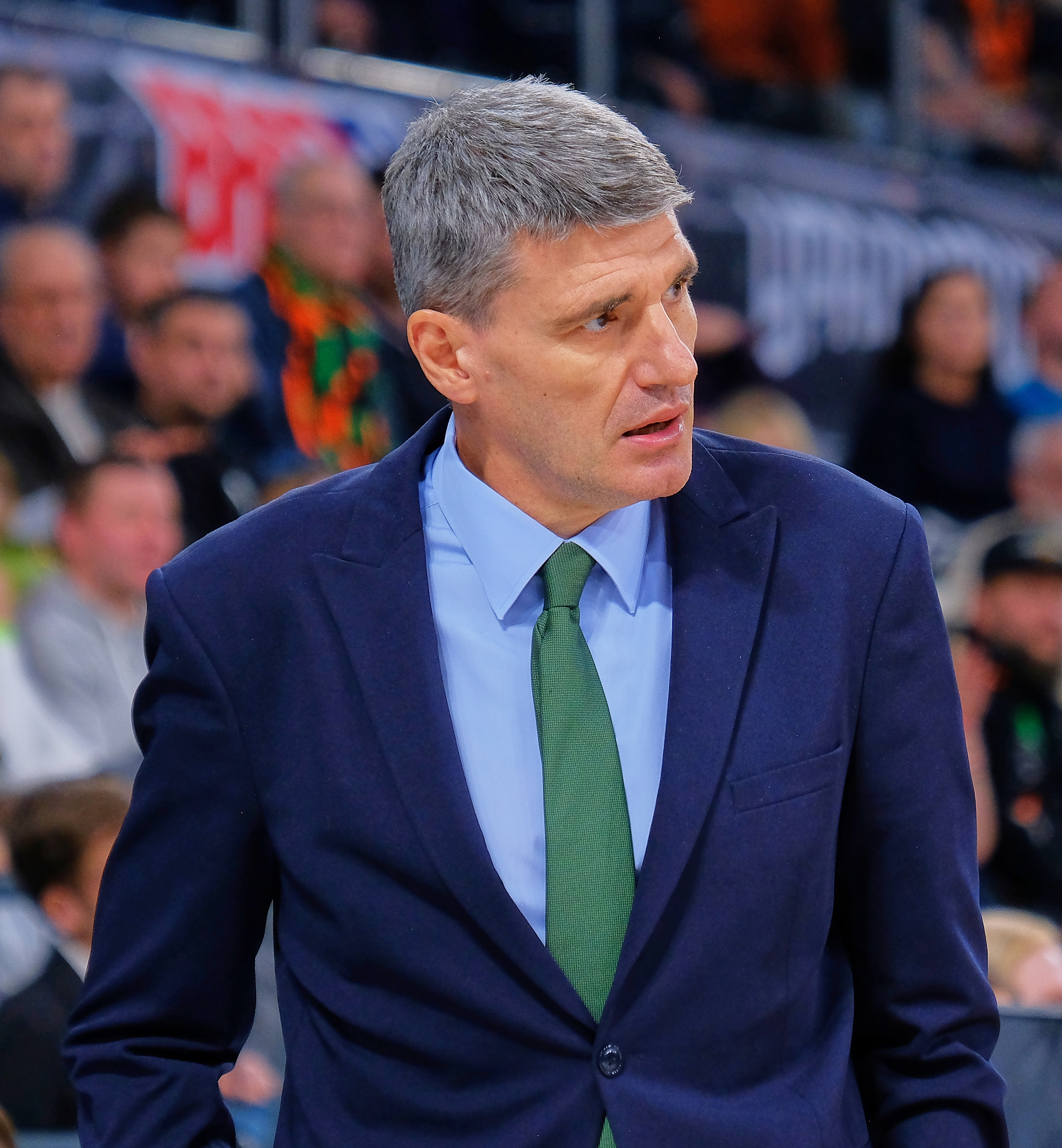
- Perasović with UNICS Kazan in 2025

Baskonia
- Title: Head coach
- League: Liga ACB; EuroLeague

Personal information
- Born: 9 February 1965 (age 61) Split, SR Croatia, SFR Yugoslavia
- Listed height: 1.96 m (6 ft 5 in)
- Listed weight: 94 kg (207 lb)

Career information
- NBA draft: 1987: undrafted
- Playing career: 1985–2003
- Position: Shooting guard
- Coaching career: 2003–present

Career history

Playing
- 1985–1992: Jugoplastika / POP 84
- 1992–1993: Breogán
- 1993–1997: Baskonia
- 1997–2002: Fuenlabrada
- 2002–2003: Alicante

Coaching
- 2003–2004: Split
- 2004–2005: Sevilla
- 2005–2007: Baskonia
- 2007–2008: Estudiantes
- 2008–2010: Cibona
- 2010–2011: Efes Pilsen
- 2012–2015: Valencia
- 2015: Croatia
- 2015–2016: Baskonia
- 2016–2017: Anadolu Efes
- 2018–2019: Baskonia
- 2021–2026: UNICS Kazan
- 2026–present: Baskonia

Career highlights
- As player: 3× EuroLeague champion (1989–1991); FIBA Saporta Cup winner (1996); 4× Yugoslav League champion (1988–1991); 2× Yugoslav Cup winner (1991, 1992); Croatian Cup winner (1992); Spanish Cup winner (1995); Spanish Cup MVP (1994); 5× Spanish League Top Scorer (1993, 1999, 2000–2002); 5× Spanish League All-Star (1992, 1998, 1999, 2000, 2001); As head coach: EuroCup champion (2014); VTB United League champion (2023); 2× Croatian League champion (2009, 2010); Spanish Cup winner (2006); Spanish Supercup winner (2006); Croatian Cup winner (2009); Turkish Cup winner (2010); VTB United League Coach of the Year (2024); AEEB Spanish Coach of the Year (2014); Award for the best coach in the Adriatic League (2009)
Medals
Men's basketball
Representing Yugoslavia
FIBA World Cup
Gold medal – first place	1990 Argentina
EuroBasket
Gold medal – first place	1991 Italy
Goodwill Games
Gold medal – first place	1990 Seattle
Summer Universiade
Silver medal – second place	1983 Edmonton
European Championship for Juniors
Bronze medal – third place	1984 Sweden
Silver medal – second place	1982 Bulgaria
Representing Croatia
Olympic Games
Silver medal – second place	1992 Barcelona	Team
EuroBasket
Bronze medal – third place	1993 Germany
Bronze medal – third place	1995 Greece

Velimir Perasović (pronounced [ʋělimir perǎːsoʋitɕ]; born 9 February 1965) is a Croatian professional basketball coach and former player. He is currently the head coach for Baskonia of the Liga ACB and the EuroLeague.

As a player, Perasović won three consecutive European cups with Split, between 1989 and 1991.

== Early life ==
Perasović was born in Split, at that time in the SFR Yugoslavia, to mother, Vica, and father, Gašpar Perasović. He started playing basketball at the age of 14.

Perasović was a member of the junior men's Yugoslavia national team which won the silver medal at the 1982 FIBA Europe Under-18 Championship in Bulgaria, and the bronze medal at the 1984 FIBA Europe Under-18 Championship in Sweden.

== Professional career ==
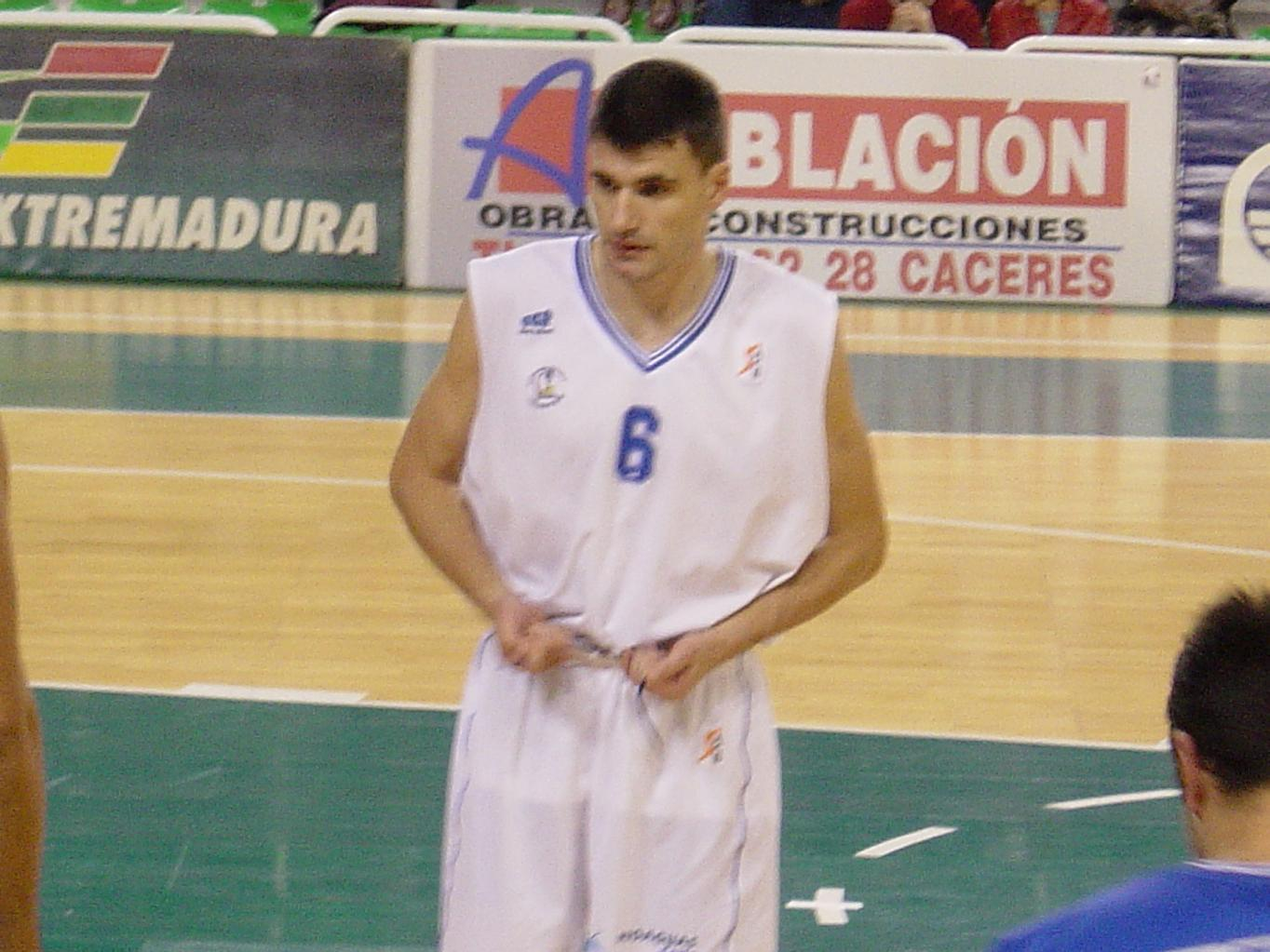
Perasović playing with Alicante in January 2002

Perasović's club, KK Split, went on to win three consecutive European Champions Cup titles, in 1989 and 1990 as "Jugoplastika", and in 1991 as "Pop 84". Between 1988 and 1991, they also won the Yugoslav League titles. Additionally, in 1990 and 1991, they won the Yugoslav Cup, and in 1992, the Croatian Cup.

In 1992, Perasović moved to Spanish club Breogán. After one season, he moved to Taugrés in 1993. He won the Spanish King's Cup in 1995, and the Saporta Cup the following year.

In 1997, he moved to Fuenlabrada, where he played until 2002. He then moved to Alicante, and retired as player in 2003. During his career in Spain, he won the Spanish ACB League Top Scorer award five times. He was also once the best scorer of the Radivoj Korać Cup, and he participated in Liga ACB All-Star games.

== National team career ==
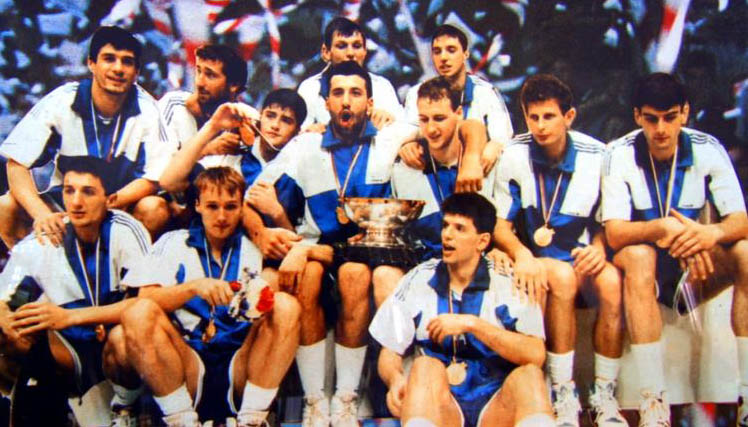
Members of the Yugoslavia national team following their victory at the 1989 EuroBasket

Perasović played for the national team of Yugoslavia, winning the 1990 World Championship in Argentina, and EuroBasket 1991 in Italy. He then played with the Croatia national team and won the silver medal at the 1992 Summer Olympics, and bronze medals at EuroBasket 1993 in Germany, the 1994 World Championship in Canada, and EuroBasket 1995 in Greece.

== Coaching career ==
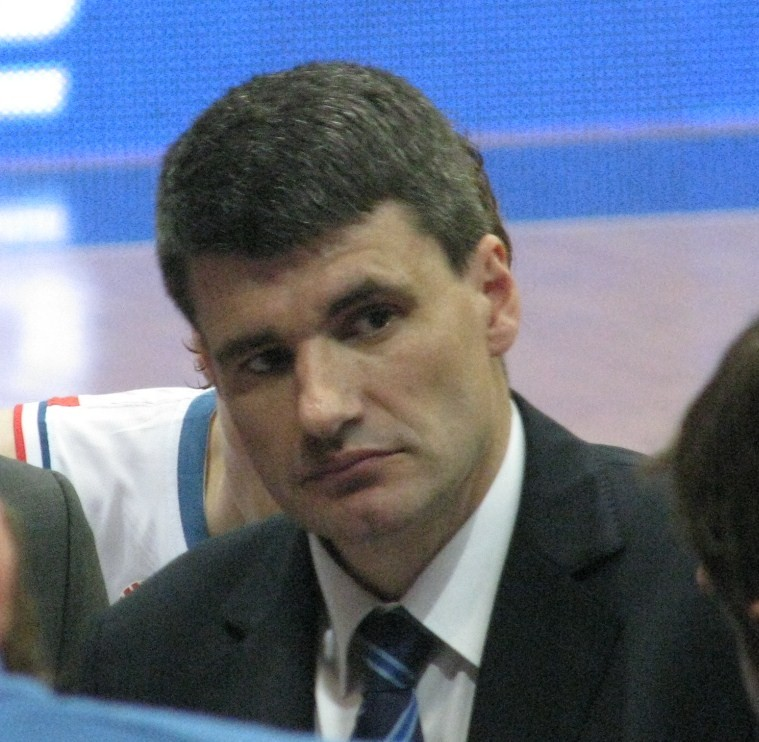
Perasović as head coach for Cibona in 2010

Perasović started his coaching career at Split, before moving back to Spain to become the head coach of Tau Cerámica. He led the team to the EuroLeague Final Four.

Prior to the 2007–08 season, Perasović was appointed the head coach for Estudiantes.

After that, he moved to Zagreb, to become the head coach for Cibona. In 2009, he led the team to the Adriatic League final, winning the award for the best coach in the Adriatic League in that season, and won the Croatian Cup and Croatian League championship. He again took Cibona to the Adriatic League and Croatian Cup finals in 2010, and once again, won the Croatian League championship.

From there, Perasović moved to Istanbul, as he took over as the head coach of Efes Pilsen. He stayed with the club for one season.

In January 2012, Perasović returned to Spain to take over as head coach for Valencia. he won the 2013–14 EuroCup, and left the club in January 2015. In March 2015, Perasović took over the senior Croatia men's national team. Following the team's disappointing performance at EuroBasket 2015, where the team was eliminated in the round of 16, Perasović and Croatia parted ways.

In June 2015, Perasović returned to Spain to coach Baskonia once again. After leading the team to semifinals of three separate competitions (EuroLeague, Copa del Rey, and Liga ACB), Perasović left the club and returned to Anadolu Efes. On 16 December 2017, Anadolu Efes and Perasović parted ways.

On 16 November 2018, Perasović returned to Spain for the third time to coach Baskonia. On 20 December 2019, following a defeat to Real Madrid, his contract was terminated.

On 29 June 2021, Perasović signed with UNICS Kazan of the VTB United League to be their head coach. He left the club in July 2026.

On 14 October 2026, he became the head coach for Baskonia for the fourth time in his coaching career.

== Coaching record ==
Legend
G	Games coached	W	Games won	L	Games lost	W–L %	Win-loss %

Note: The EuroLeague is not the only competition in which the team played during the season. He also coached in domestic competition, and regional competition if applicable.

=== EuroLeague ===
Team	Year	G	W	L	W–L%	Result
Baskonia	2005–06	21	15	6	.714	Won in 3rd place game
Baskonia	2006–07	24	20	4	.833	Lost in 3rd place game
Cibona	2008–09	17	8	9	.471	Eliminated in Top 16 stage
Cibona	2009–10	16	4	12	.250	Eliminated in Top 16 stage
Efes	2010–11	16	7	9	.438	Eliminated in Top 16 stage
Valencia	2014–15	10	3	7	.300	Eliminated in group stage
Baskonia	2015–16	29	18	11	.621	Lost in 3rd place game
Anadolu Efes	2016–17	35	19	16	.543	Eliminated in quarterfinals
Anadolu Efes	2017–18	12	3	9	.250	Fired
Baskonia	2018–19	30	16	18	.471	Eliminated in quarterfinals
Career		214	113	101	.528	

== Personal life ==
Perasović married his wife, Dubravka, in 1991, and they have two sons, Vicko and Ivan. The latter is also a professional basketball player.
