= Zoran Sretenović =

Serbian basketball player and coach (1964–2022)

Personal information
- Born: 5 August 1964 Belgrade, SR Serbia, SFR Yugoslavia
- Died: 28 April 2022 (aged 57) Belgrade, Serbia
- Listed height: 1.89 m (6 ft 2 in)

Career information
- NBA draft: 1986: undrafted
- Playing career: 1981–2001
- Position: Point guard
- Number: 4
- Coaching career: 2001–2016

Career history

Playing
- 1984–1986: Crvena zvezda
- 1986–1991: Jugoplastika
- 1991–1992: Bamberg
- 1992–1993: Olympique Antibes
- 1993–1994: Partizan
- 1994–1995: Borovica Ruma
- 1995–1996: Crvena zvezda
- 1996–1997: Borovica Ruma
- 1997–1998: Radnički Belgrade
- 1998–2001: Stal Ostrów Wielkopolski

Coaching
- 2001: Budućnost
- 2004–2005: Hemofarm (assistant)
- 2006–2007: Železničar Inđija
- 2007–2008: Igokea
- 2008: Vojvodina Srbijagas
- 2009–2010: Železničar Inđija
- 2010–2011: Polpharma Starogard Gdański
- 2013: AZS Koszalin
- 2015–2016: Stal Ostrów Wielkopolski

Career highlights
- 3× Euroleague champion (1989–1991); 4× Yugoslav League champion (1988–1991); 3× Yugoslav Cup winner (1990, 1991, 1994); German Cup winner (1992); French All-Star Game (1993)
Medals
Men's basketball
Representing (Socialist Federal Republic of Yugoslavia) (Federal Republic of Yugoslavia) Yugoslavia
European Championships
Gold medal – first place	1991 Italy	SFRY Team
Gold medal – first place	1995 Greece	FRY Team

Zoran Sretenović (Serbian Cyrillic: Зоран Сретеновић; 5 August 1964 – 28 April 2022) was a Serbian basketball coach and player.

== Playing career ==
Sretenović played for several clubs in his country and abroad, most notably with Jugoplastika/Pop 84 from Split where he won three European Champion Cups, usually in the starting lineup. In the third of those title games, in Paris against F.C. Barcelona, Sretenovic became the second of only three players, and the only European ever, to play all 40 minutes of a Final Four title game for the winning team. He also won championships and cups of Germany, four titles, two Cups and two Supercups of Yugoslavia.

== National team career ==
Sretenović was a member of the Yugoslavia national cadet team at the 1981 European Championship for Cadets in Greece. Over six tournament games, he averaged 7.0 points per game.

Sretenović was a member of the Yugoslavia national basketball team (representing SFR Yugoslavia) that won the gold medal at the 1991 FIBA European Championship in Rome, Italy. Over five tournament games, he averaged 3.8 points per game.

Sretenović was a member of the Yugoslavia national team (representing FR Yugoslavia) that won the gold medal at EuroBasket 1995 in Athens, Greece. Over three tournament games, he averaged 1.3 points and 1.3 assists per game.

== Coaching career ==
Upon retiring, Sretenović entered into a coaching career.

In the 2001–02 season, he became head coach of KK Budućnost Podgorica. He was also the assistant coach to Željko Lukajić at KK Hemofarm in 2005. In 2007–08, he was the head coach of KK Igokea. From July to November 2008, he was the head coach of KK Vojvodina Srbijagas. He later worked in Polpharma Starogard Gdański and AZS Koszalin.
