= Ostoja Mijailović =

Serbian entrepreneur, sport executive, former politician

- Остоја Мијаиловић
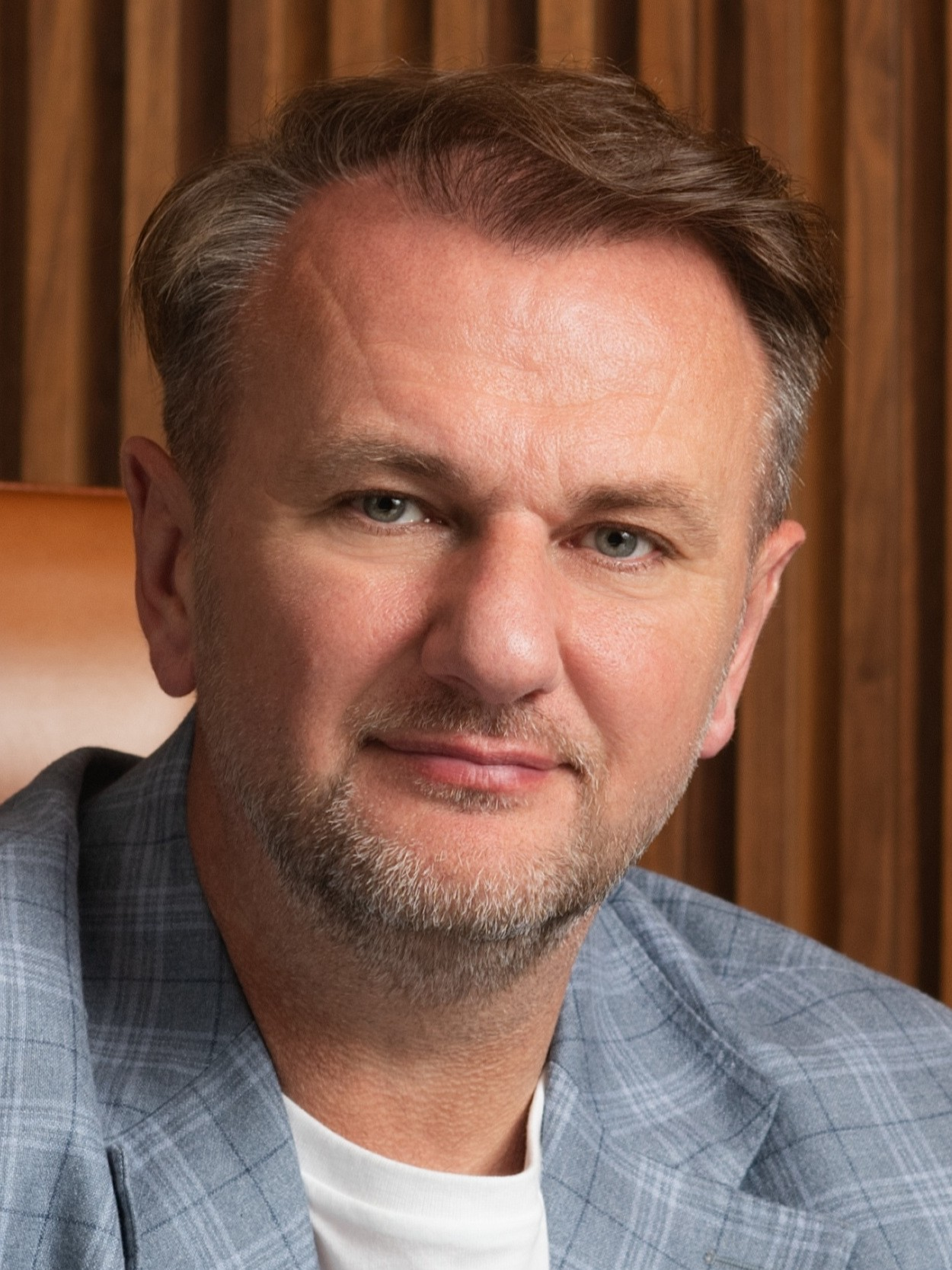
- Mijailović in 2025

President of KK Partizan
- Incumbent
- Assumed office 20 October 2017
- Preceded by: Nikola Peković

President of ABA League JTD
- Incumbent
- Assumed office 21 July 2026
- Preceded by: Jure Balažič

President of JSD Partizan
- In office 12 September 2022 – 1 February 2025
- Preceded by: Milorad Vučelić
- Succeeded by: Željko Tanasković

Member of the National Assembly of Serbia
- In office 3 June 2016 – 3 June 2020

Personal details
- Born: 25 May 1979 (age 47) Čačak, SR Serbia, SFR Yugoslavia
- Party: NS (2000–2015); SNS (2015–2020)
- Occupation: Entrepreneur, sport executive, former politician

Ostoja Mijailović (born May 25, 1979 in Čačak) is a Serbian entrepreneur and sports official. He is the founder and president of the business system OMR Group and the president of the KK Partizan.

== Business career ==
Mijailović is the founder and president of OMR Group, a business system that has existed for over 20 years and currently employs over 1,200 workers. The group works in the sectors of the automotive industry, insurance, finance and leasing, nautical industry, and real estate.

=== Automotive industry ===
Mijailović founded the company Bavaria Motorrad for vehicle sales, and then in 2016, he founded British Motors, which became the exclusive importer and distributor for Jaguar and Land Rover vehicles for Serbia and Montenegro, The business was further expanded through a partnership with the company Stellantis, via the firm Crossroad Adria. Today, OMR Group represents the brands Fiat, Fiat Professional, Jeep, Abarth, Alfa Romeo, Changan, Land Rover, Hyundai, Isuzu, Subaru, and Kawasaki.

The group acquired fleet management and leasing companies AKS Fleet Solution (2018) and MiOS Rent-a-car and Limo service, as well as the company Fleet Management Team (FMT) which is involved in production. Within the group, the automotive division also includes Bavaria Team, Ada Motors, Trio Motors, and BM Centar za polovna vozila (Used Vehicle Center).

After signing an agreement with a Chinese automobile manufacturers, Changan Automobile, OMR Group - through its member Crossroad Asia in July 2025 obtained exclusive distribution rights for Changan Automobile in the Western Balkans.

=== Other sectors ===
The group works in nautical tourism through OMR Premium Yachting (representative for Azimut Benetti) and in the real estate sector through the company Lux Invest. In 2025, OMR Group became the owner of the business complex Sava Business Center in Belgrade.

=== Business associations ===
Mijailović, president of OMR Group, was elected as a new member of the board of directors of the Italian-Serbian Business Association at the General Assembly held on March 21, 2024. He has been a member of the British-Serbian Business Chamber for years, and is currently also the vice president of this chamber, which aims to promote and facilitate trade between the United Kingdom and Serbia.

== Political career ==
Mijailović began his political engagement in the New Serbia party (2000–2015), during which he was a member of the City Council in Čačak responsible for the development of small and medium-sized enterprises. In 2015, he joined the Serbian Progressive Party (SNS). In the 2016 parliamentary elections, he was elected as a member of parliament in the National Assembly of the Republic of Serbia. During his term (2016–2020), he served as a deputy member of the Committee on the Diaspora and the Committee on Economy, Regional Development and Trade. As the law on sports stipulates that professional sports officials are not allowed to hold political functions, Mijailović froze his party membership in 2020. Since that moment, he has not held any political functions and is not politically active. After his political term, he returned to managing OMR group and KK Partizan.

== Sports management ==
After a brief engagement on the board of directors of FK Partizan (2015–2016), in September 2017, Mijailović was appointed president of KK Partizan at a time when the club was in a difficult financial situation. His tenure was marked by the financial stabilization of the club and a return to the EuroLeague. During his tenure, KK Partizan won two titles in ABA League (2022/23 season and 2024/2025 season), one ABA Supercup, three Radivoj Korać Cups, and one Serbian SuperLeague, as well as a placement in the EuroLeague Top 8. From September 2022 until February 2025, he was the president of JSD Partizan.
