= 1986–87 Yugoslav First Basketball League =

- League: Yugoslav First Basketball League
- Sport: Basketball
- Duration: 17 March – 21 April 1987 (Playoffs)

Regular season
- Season champions: (Socialist Republic of Croatia) Cibona

Playoffs
- Finals champions: (Socialist Republic of Serbia) Partizan
- Runners-up: Crvena Zvezda

Yugoslav First Basketball League seasons
- ← 1985–86 1987–88 →

The 1986–87 Yugoslav First Basketball League season was the 43rd season of the Yugoslav First Basketball League, the highest professional basketball league in SFR Yugoslavia.

== Teams ==
(Socialist Republic of Croatia) SR Croatia

- Cibona
- Jugoplastika
- Šibenka
- Zadar

(Socialist Republic of Serbia) SR Serbia

- Borac Čačak
- Crvena Zvezda
- Partizan

(Socialist Republic of Bosnia and Herzegovina) SR Bosnia and Herzegovina

- Bosna
- Sloboda Dita Tuzla

(Socialist Republic of Macedonia) SR Macedonia

- MZT Skopje
- Rabotnički

(Socialist Republic of Montenegro) SR Montenegro

- Budućnost

== Regular season ==
=== Classification ===
	Regular season ranking 1986-87	G	V	P	PF	PS	Pt
1.	Cibona	22	22	0	2242	1960	44
2.	Partizan	22	18	4	2105	1950	40
3.	Jugoplastika	22	15	7	2040	1816	37
4.	Crvena Zvezda	22	15	7	1974	1860	37
5.	Šibenka	22	12	10	2006	1982	34
6.	Bosna	22	12	10	1950	1914	34
7.	Zadar	22	9	13	1897	1979	31
8.	MZT Skopje	22	7	15	1771	1892	29
9.	Budućnost	22	7	15	1826	2010	29
10.	Borac Čačak	22	7	15	1839	1968	27
11.	Sloboda Dita Tuzla	22	5	17	1816	1957	27
12.	KGD Rabotnički	22	3	19	1758	2036	25

== Results ==
Home \ Away	CIB	PAR	JUG	CZV	ŠIB	BOS	ZAD	MZT	BUD	BOR	SLT	RAB
Cibona	—	111–103	105–103	99–89	104–96	121–90	91–88	101–80	126–101	112–90	105–96	120–103
Partizan	86–111	—	90–88	97–84	101–88	90–84	86–81	106–76	109–93	110–93	105–75	110–86
Jugoplastika	77–80	102–84	—	93–78	109–100	89–84	91–83	84–80	126–86	115–86	120–75	100–75
Crvena Zvezda	91–93	92–102	94–91	—	92–84	94–84	96–90	91–70	81–76	98–88	94–80	96–87
Šibenka	102–109	93–87	70–90	74–72	—	106–84	95–96	86–79	107–92	85–76	118–86	104–98
Bosna	78–94	81–82	84–70	88–105	107–91	—	108–84	93–88	79–76	106–82	74–71	116–72
Zadar	76–91	83–86	85–98	80–82	79–84	90–86	—	99–81	96–75	108–78	88–85	87–61
MZT Skopje	75–78	79–81	87–80	80–81	86–105	102–106	73–93	—	90–83	80–78	79–70	84–73
Budućnost	93–109	82–102	73–70	63–89	75–76	84–79	85–79	79–69	—	83–72	93–87	101–82
Borac Čačak	73–81	90–91	75–81	91–90	100–79	75–87	89–70	78–79	77–75	—	80–77	79–68
Sloboda Tuzla	81–94	94–105	75–79	72–84	84–88	80–83	86–76	70–68	112–72	106–93	—	70–69
Rabotnički	89–107	84–92	67–84	78–101	76–75	68–69	75–86	77–86	93–86	87–99	90–84	—

Source: Pearlbasket.org
Legend: Blue = home team win; Red = away team win.
Matches with lighter background shading were decided after overtime.

== Playoff ==
Only the top four placed league table teams qualified for the playoffs quarterfinal automatically.

Teams placed fifth, sixth, seventh, eighth, ninth, and tenth were joined by the top two Second League teams for an 8-team play-in round. The winner of each best-of-three series advanced to the playoffs quarterfinal round.

Quarterfinals
1	Cibona	2
8	MZT Skopje	0
4	Crvena Zvezda	2
5	Šibenka	0
2	Partizan	2
7	Zadar	0
3	Jugoplastika	1
6	Bosna	2

Semifinals
1	Cibona	1
4	Crvena Zvezda	2
2	Partizan	2
3	Bosna	1

Finals
4	Crvena Zvezda	0
2	Partizan	2

PLAY-IN QUALIFYING ROUND 17-21-24/03

Šibenka-IMT 90-87, 95-115, 101-95

Bosna-Olimpija Ljubljana 120-101, 105-102

Zadar-Borac 77-79, 76-68, 97-80

MZT Skopje-Buducnost 93-80, 95-91

QUARTERFINALS 28-31/03,04/04

Jugoplastika-Bosna 89-76, 85-92, 82-84

Cibona-MZT Skopje 117-92, 84-79

Partizan-Zadar 105-88, 81-93, 110-92

Crvena zvezda-Šibenka 91-90, 94-89

SEMIFINALS 7-11-14/04

Cibona-Crvena zvezda 92-74, 92-94, 103-104

Partizan-Bosna 85-77, 96-103, 107-96

FINALS 18-21/04

Partizan-Crvena zvezda 78-73, 89-88

The winning roster of Partizan:

- (Socialist Federal Republic of Yugoslavia) Vlade Divac
- (Socialist Federal Republic of Yugoslavia) Žarko Paspalj
- (Socialist Federal Republic of Yugoslavia) Goran Grbović
- (Socialist Federal Republic of Yugoslavia) Aleksandar Đorđević
- (Socialist Federal Republic of Yugoslavia) Milenko Savović
- (Socialist Federal Republic of Yugoslavia) Želimir Obradović
- (Socialist Federal Republic of Yugoslavia) Ivo Nakić
- (Socialist Federal Republic of Yugoslavia) Slaviša Koprivica
- (Socialist Federal Republic of Yugoslavia) Savo Stefanović
- (Socialist Federal Republic of Yugoslavia) Obrad Ignjatović
- (Socialist Federal Republic of Yugoslavia) Vladimir Dragutinović
- (Socialist Federal Republic of Yugoslavia) Dejan Lakićević
- (Socialist Federal Republic of Yugoslavia) Slobodan Kanjevac
- (Socialist Federal Republic of Yugoslavia) Boris Orcev

Coach: (Socialist Federal Republic of Yugoslavia) Duško Vujošević

== Scoring leaders ==
1. Dražen Petrović (Cibona) - ___ points (37.1ppg)

== Qualification in 1987–88 season European competitions ==
FIBA European Champions Cup

- Partizan (champions)

FIBA Cup Winners' Cup

- IMT (Cup winners)

FIBA Korać Cup

- Cibona (1st)
- Jugoplastika (3rd)
- Crvena Zvezda (4th)
- Šibenka (5th)

== Basketball Cup ==
=== Preliminary round ===
Key to colors
Top placed team in each group advanced to semifinals

==== Titov Vrbas tournament ====
	Team	Pld	W	L	Pts
1	Partizan	3	3	0	6
2	Cibona	3	2	1	4
3	Mornar Bar	3	1	2	2
4	Borac Čačak	3	0	3	0

==== Prizren tournament ====
	Team	Pld	W	L	Pts
1	Smelt Olimpija	3	3	0	6
2	Bosna	3	2	1	4
3	Šibenka	3	1	2	2
4	Bashkimi	3	0	3	0

==== Zenica tournament ====
	Team	Pld	W	L	Pts
1	IMT	3	3	0	6
2	MZT Skopje	3	2	1	4
3	Garnizon JNA	3	1	2	2
4	Željezničar Sarajevo	3	0	3	0

==== Čakovec tournament ====
	Team	Pld	W	L	Pts
1	Jugoplastika	3	3	0	6
2	Budućnost	3	2	1	4
3	Vojvodina	3	1	2	2
4	Zorka Šabac	2	0	2	0

=== Bracket ===
Semifinals
Jugoplastika
Smelt Olimpija
Partizan	80
IMT	86

Finals
Smelt Olimpija	73
IMT	76
