= Goran Grbović =

Serbian basketball player

Personal information
- Born: 9 February 1961 (age 65) Kruševac, PR Serbia, FPR Yugoslavia
- Listed height: 2.02 m (6 ft 8 in)

Career information
- NBA draft: 1983: undrafted
- Playing career: 1979–1991
- Position: Small forward

Career history
- 1979–1980: Borac Čačak
- 1980–1988: Partizan
- 1988–1990: Oximesa
- 1991: IMT

Career highlights
- ACB League All-Star (1988)
Medals
Men's basketball
Representing Yugoslavia
Eurobasket
Bronze medal – third place	1987 Greece	Team
Universiade
Gold medal – first place	1987 Zagreb	Team
Silver medal – second place	1983 Edmonton	Team
European Championship for Juniors
Silver medal – second place	1980 Yugoslavia	Team

Goran Grbović (born 9 February 1961) is a Serbian business manager and former professional basketball player. He is an executive director of the Štark Arena.

== Playing career ==
Born in Kruševac, after finishing high school, he moved to Čačak. He started his career with KK Borac Čačak, where he was trained by the legendary Aleksandar Nikolić and Dragan Milošević - Gaga. He played for Partizan from 1980 until 1988, winning a national championship in 1981 and 1987 also a third-place finish in Euroleague in 1988. He ended his career after two successful seasons with Oximesa Granada.

He is also remembered as an idol of many Partizan fans, inspiring many children to play basketball.

=== Partizan ===
Grbović played in Partizan from 1980 until 1988, he won National championship in 1981 and 1987 and participated in Euroleague F4 in 1988. That season, he scored the most points in hall Euroleague. He was also the best scorer of national championship in 1983 and 1984. He holds second place in club history by points in one play-off game, 44. He is seventh scorer in club history with 3889 points in 240 games, his average is 16.2 points.

== National team career ==
Although he was qualified for the Yugoslav national team, he participated in only two competitions – EuroBasket tournaments in 1983 and 1987. He won a bronze medal in EuroBasket 1987 with the Yugoslav national team.

== Player profile ==
Grbović was seen as a strong yet temperamental player. Fittingly, his nickname was "Tank". He was 2.02 m tall and played small forward. He excelled in the three-point shot and audiences often lauded his dunks.

== Post-playing career ==
In July 2018, he was named an executive director of the Štark Arena in Belgrade.

== Achievements ==
- Yugoslav league champion: 2 (with Partizan: 1980–81 and 1986–87)

=== Individual achievements ===
- ACB League All Star participation: 1988
- Yugoslav championship best scorer: 1983, 1984.
