= 1987–88 First Federal Basketball League =

1987–88 Yugoslav First Basketball League
- League: Yugoslav First Basketball League
- Sport: Basketball

Regular season
- Season champions: (Socialist Republic of Croatia) Jugoplastika

Playoffs
- Finals champions: (Socialist Republic of Croatia) Jugoplastika
- Runners-up: Partizan

Yugoslav First Basketball League seasons
- ← 1986–87 1988–89 →

The 1987–88 Yugoslav First Basketball League season was the 44th season of the Yugoslav First Basketball League, the highest professional basketball league in SFR Yugoslavia.

== Teams ==
(Socialist Republic of Croatia) SR Croatia

- Cibona
- Jugoplastika
- Šibenka
- Zadar

(Socialist Republic of Serbia) SR Serbia

- Borac Čačak
- Crvena Zvezda
- IMT
- Partizan

(Socialist Republic of Bosnia and Herzegovina) SR Bosnia and Herzegovina

- Bosna

(Socialist Republic of Macedonia) SR Macedonia

- MZT Skopje

(Socialist Republic of Montenegro) SR Montenegro

- Budućnost

(Socialist Republic of Slovenia) SR Slovenia

- Smelt Olimpija

== Regular season ==
=== Classification ===
	Regular season ranking 1987–88	G	V	P	PF	PS	Pt
1.	Jugoplastika	22	21	1	2025	1764	43
2.	Cibona	22	17	5	2235	2007	39
3.	Partizan	22	15	7	2066	1973	37
4.	Smelt Olimpija	22	14	8	2018	1943	36
5.	Zadar	22	10	12	2050	1974	32
6.	Crvena Zvezda	22	10	12	1937	1997	32
7.	IMT	22	9	13	2042	2106	31
8.	Šibenka	22	9	13	1976	2020	31
9.	Bosna	22	8	14	1992	2028	30
10.	Borac Čačak	22	7	15	1839	2002	29
11.	MZT Skopje	22	6	16	1858	2046	28
12.	Budućnost	22	6	16	1915	2093	28

== Results ==
Home \ Away	JUG	CIB	PAR	OLI	ZAD	CZV	IMT	ŠIB	BOS	BOR	MZT	BUD
Jugoplastika	—	96–83	90–85	99–73	82–73	86–77	119–85	86–76	98–90	111–73	95–74	97–81
Cibona	86–87	—	99–90	110–90	84–72	98–88	100–86	111–91	102–96	124–89	117–104	106–96
Partizan	79–87	90–88	—	93–98	84–78	85–95	110–96	90–83	115–110	98–99	96–82	103–94
Olimpija	82–83	84–78	87–92	—	99–86	99–77	99–96	95–89	99–79	109–96	94–74	96–78
Zadar	76–84	91–92	83–86	109–107	—	102–86	100–88	100–79	87–94	88–87	109–63	122–94
Crvena Zvezda	86–90	101–104	85–106	101–88	93–89	—	83–85	96–79	97–90	95–89	96–86	99–92
IMT	81–95	97–96	85–95	96–98	121–112	85–87	—	94–82	86–93	83–79	95–92	100–109
Šibenka	90–71	90–96	87–76	78–89	107–103	104–85	98–125	—	111–93	82–83	107–99	108–91
Bosna	88–96	86–103	107–121	73–92	83–84	90–84	93–97	82–77	—	105–78	95–77	83–78
Borac Čačak	76–85	100–128	81–89	91–85	78–81	87–74	86–84	74–75	91–82	—	87–79	63–76
MZT Skopje	83–91	86–104	80–95	92–80	94–90	76–77	76–73	92–97	69–98	88–74	—	111–97
Budućnost	67–97	97–126	79–87	73–75	89–114	87–75	102–104	89–86	86–83	81–78	79–81	—

Source: Pearlbasket
Legend: Blue = home team win; Red = away team win.
Matches with lighter background shading were decided after overtime.

== Playoff ==
Only the top four placed league table teams qualified for the playoffs quarterfinal automatically.

Teams placed fifth, sixth, seventh, eighth, ninth, and tenth were joined by the top two Second League teams for an 8-team play-in round. The winner of each best-of-three series advanced to the playoffs quarterfinal round.

Quarterfinals
1	Jugoplastika	2
8	Šibenka	0
4	Smelt Olimpija	2
5	Zadar	1
2	Cibona	2
7	IMT	0
3	Partizan	2
6	Crvena Zvezda	0

Semifinals
1	Jugoplastika	2
4	Smelt Olimpija	0
2	Cibona	1
3	Partizan	2

Finals
1	Jugoplastika	2
3	Partizan	1

PLAY-IN QUALIFYING ROUND

Zadar-Vojvodina 101–84, 78–81, 95–81

Crvena Zvezda-Prvi Partizan 98–91, 94–83

IMT Beograd-Borac 121–86, 112–113, 107–87

Šibenka-Bosna 103–102, 98–109, 108–93

QUARTERFINALS

Jugoplastika-Šibenka 107–80, 107–96

Olimpija Ljubljana-Zadar 77–76, 77–82, 82–76

Cibona-IMT Beograd 127–103, 89–86

Partizan-Crvena Zvezda 105–96, 101–90

SEMIFINALS

Jugoplastika-Olimpija Ljubljana 103–81, 86–83

Cibona-Partizan 102–91, 90–103, 77–83

FINALS

Jugoplastika-Partizan 101–79, 80–86, 88–67

=== Finals ===
Top-seeded Jugoplastika reached the playoff finals dominantly, rampaging though the league with a 21–1 regular season record followed by two confident playoff sweeps.

On the other hand, despite being the defending champions, third seed KK Partizan returned to the playoff finals somewhat unexpectedly, having to overcome second seed KK Cibona's home-court advantage in their semifinal series by improbably defeating the Zagreb team away in deciding game three, 77–83, with Cibona's superstar Dražen Petrović held to only 13 points while Partizan's best player, young center Vlade Divac, scored 23 points.

==== Game 1: Jugoplastika vs. Partizan 101–79 ====
Twenty-year-old Divac would also become the main story of the finals' opening game despite being absent from it due to picking up a knee injury under never fully explained circumstances. It would later come out that his injury likely occurred jumping out of a hotel window while leaving, without permission, the pre-finals team quarantine to meet with his girlfriend. As a result of missing their best player, Partizan struggled mightily in game one away in Split, getting blown out by 22 points, 101–79, with Jugoplastika's young center Dino Rađa scoring 23 points, Željko Poljak adding 16, and young Toni Kukoč scoring 15. On the other hand, hapless Partizan's best contribution was from their young point guard Saša Đorđević who scored 22 points.

==== Game 2: Partizan vs. Jugoplastika 86–80 ====
Seeing that without Divac's inside presence they stand no chance versus Jugoplastika, Partizan hustled their injured young center back on the court. Playing on one leg with a heavily bandaged knee, Divac still led the game two scoring with 18 points as Partizan pulled out an 86–80 victory at home. It was only Jugoplastika's second loss of the entire season.

==== Game 3: Jugoplastika vs. Partizan 88–67 ====
Still-injured Divac appeared in the deciding game three back in Split but was no match for the rampant home team looking for their first league title since 1977. The fact that Partizan played with virtually no inside presence under the basket was heavily exploited by Jugoplastika's center line of Rađa and Goran Sobin, as their backup center Sobin posted his season-high 28 points. Jugoplastika won the game easily, claiming the league title.

The winning roster of Jugoplastika:

- (Socialist Federal Republic of Yugoslavia) Zoran Sretenović
- (Socialist Federal Republic of Yugoslavia) Velimir Perasović
- (Socialist Federal Republic of Yugoslavia) Vladan Alanović
- (Socialist Federal Republic of Yugoslavia) Toni Kukoč
- (Socialist Federal Republic of Yugoslavia) Goran Sobin
- (Socialist Federal Republic of Yugoslavia) Željko Poljak
- (Socialist Federal Republic of Yugoslavia) Ivica Burić
- (Socialist Federal Republic of Yugoslavia) Žan Tabak
- (Socialist Federal Republic of Yugoslavia) Duško Ivanović
- (Socialist Federal Republic of Yugoslavia) Dino Rađa
- (Socialist Federal Republic of Yugoslavia) Petar Vučica
- (Socialist Federal Republic of Yugoslavia) Paško Tomić
- (Socialist Federal Republic of Yugoslavia) Teo Čizmić
- (Socialist Federal Republic of Yugoslavia) Leon Stipaničev
- (Socialist Federal Republic of Yugoslavia) Alen Koludrović

Coach: (Socialist Federal Republic of Yugoslavia) Božidar Maljković

== Scoring leaders ==
1. Dražen Petrović (Cibona) – ___ points (38.0ppg)
2. Milan Mlađan (IMT) – __ points (30.1 ppg)

== Qualification in 1988–89 season European competitions ==
FIBA European Champions Cup

- Jugoplastika (champions)

FIBA Cup Winners' Cup

- Cibona (Cup winners)

FIBA Korać Cup

- Partizan (3rd)
- Smelt Olimpija (4th)
- Zadar (5th)
- Crvena Zvezda (6th)

== Basketball Cup ==
=== Preliminary round ===
Key to colors
Top placed team in each group advanced to semifinals

==== Aranđelovac tournament ====
	Team	Pld	W	L	PD	Pts
1	Partizan	3	2	1	+12	4
2	MZT Skopje	3	2	1	+1	4
3	Smelt Olimpija	3	2	1	-13	4
4	Prvi partizan	3	0	3		0

==== Bar tournament ====
	Team	Pld	W	L	PD	Pts
1	Rabotnički	3	3	0		6
2	Crvena zvezda	3	1	2	+14	2
3	Šibenka	3	1	2	+1	2
4	Mornar Bar	3	1	2	-15	2

==== Kutina tournament ====
	Team	Pld	W	L	Pts
1	Cibona	3	3	0	6
2	Bosna	3	2	1	4
3	IMT	3	1	2	2
4	Trepča	3	0	3	0

==== Novi Sad tournament ====
	Team	Pld	W	L	Pts
1	Jugoplastika	3	3	0	6
2	Zadar	3	2	1	4
3	Vojvodina	2	0	2	0
4	Sloboda Dita Tuzla	2	0	2	0

=== Bracket ===
Semifinals
Jugoplastika	75
Partizan	73
Cibona
Rabotnički

Finals
Jugoplastika	80
Cibona	82
