= Borovo Sports Hall =

Sports venue in Vukovar, Croatia

Danijel Rehak Sports Hall
- Interactive map of Danijel Rehak Sports Hall
- Location: Vukovar, Croatia
- Coordinates: 45°22.39′N 18°57.56′E
- Owner: City of Vukovar
- Capacity: 3,000
- Surface: parquet

Construction
- Built: 1978
- Renovated: 2002

Tenant
- KK Borovo Vukovar

Danijel Rehak Sports Hall is a multi-purpose sport hall in Vukovar with sporting, cultural, business and entertainment events. The capacity of the sports hall is 3000 seats, 2400 seating places and 600 standing places and it is mostly used for basketball matches as the home ground of KK Borovo Vukovar. Hall is built for XXIII Yugoslavia Open Championship Table Tennis 1978 hosted by Vukovar

The hall Borovo operates more sports clubs in different sports : boxing, handball, basketball, volleyball, gymnastics . For the purposes of gymnasts 2015. onsite opened a hall for gymnastics. Hall also has fitness centar and bowling alley.

== Concerts & Events ==
- Danijela Martinović charity concert for the Church of Our Lady of Fatima in Vukovar - April 18, 2002
- Lijepom našom HRT television music show held the filming event - December 20, 2011
- Halid Bešlić performed a concert - December 22, 2012
- Oliver Dragojević performed a charity concert - November 5, 2012
- Marko Perković performed a concert - December 29, 2013
