= 1988–89 FIBA European Champions Cup =

- League: FIBA European Champions Cup
- Sport: Basketball

Regular Season

Final Four
- Champions: (Socialist Federal Republic of Yugoslavia) Jugoplastika (1st title)
- Runners-up: (Israel) Maccabi Elite Tel Aviv
- Final Four MVP: (Socialist Federal Republic of Yugoslavia) Dino Rađa (Jugoplastika)

FIBA European Champions Cup seasons
- ← 1987–88 1989–90 →

The 1988–89 FIBA European Champions Cup was the 32nd season of the European top-tier level professional FIBA European Champions Cup (now called EuroLeague), which was won by Jugoplastika, after they beat Maccabi Elite Tel Aviv 75-69. The culminating 1989 EuroLeague Final Four was held at Olympiahalle, Munich, West Germany, on 4–6 April 1989. Dino Rađja was named Final Four MVP.

== Competition system ==
- 27 teams (European national domestic league champions only), playing in a tournament system, played knock-out rounds on a home and away basis. The aggregate score of both games decided the winner.
- The eight remaining teams after the knock-out rounds entered a 1/4 Final Group Stage, which was played as a round-robin. The final standing was based on individual wins and defeats. In the case of a tie between two or more teams after the group stage, the following criteria were used to decide the final classification: 1) number of wins in one-to-one games between the teams; 2) basket average between the teams; 3) general basket average within the group.
- The top four teams after the 1/4 Final Group Stage qualified for the Final Stage (Final Four), which was played at a predetermined venue.

== First round ==
Team 1	Agg.	Team 2	1st leg	2nd leg
Partizani Tirana (Albania)	180-176	(Hungary) ZTE	101–90	79–86
BMS (Denmark)	172-191	(Belgium) Sunair Oostende	86–97	86–94
Ovarense (Portugal)	227-151	(Luxembourg) Contern	113–64	114–87
AEL (Cyprus)	143-230	(Greece) Aris	67–115	76–115
KTP (Finland)	217-173	(Switzerland) Champel Genève	101–66	116–107
Eczacıbaşı (Turkey)	141-145	(Czechoslovakia) Zbrojovka Brno	79–66	62–79
Asker (Norway)	155-234	(Netherlands) Nashua EBBC	81–103	74–131
Klosterneuburg (Austria)	155-156	(Bulgaria) Balkan Botevgrad	83–82	72–74

== Round of 16 ==
Team 1	Agg.	Team 2	1st leg	2nd leg
Partizani Tirana (Albania)	156-192	(Italy) Scavolini Pesaro	72–84	84–108
Sunair Oostende (Belgium)	182-197	(Israel) Maccabi Elite Tel Aviv	91–104	91–93
Ovarense (Portugal)	163-207	(Socialist Federal Republic of Yugoslavia) Jugoplastika	87–94	76–113
Södertälje (Sweden)	175-190	(Greece) Aris	93–85	82–105
KTP (Finland)	152-181	(Spain) FC Barcelona	78–87	74–94
Zbrojovka Brno (Czechoslovakia)	141-240	(France) Limoges CSP	87–111	54–129
Nashua EBBC (Netherlands)	176-160	(West Germany) Saturn 77 Köln	90–87	86–73
Balkan Botevgrad (Bulgaria)	148-190	(Soviet Union) CSKA Moscow	80–103	68–87

== Quarterfinal round ==
Key to colors
Top four places in the group advance to Final four

	Team	Pld	Pts	W	L	PF	PA
1.	(Israel) Maccabi Elite Tel Aviv	14	26	12	2	1314	1221
2.	(Spain) FC Barcelona	14	25	11	3	1207	1120
3.	(Socialist Federal Republic of Yugoslavia) Jugoplastika	14	22	8	6	1205	1167
4.	(Greece) Aris	14	22	8	6	1269	1261
5.	(France) Limoges CSP	14	20	6	8	1269	1266
6.	(Italy) Scavolini Pesaro	14	19	5	9	1130	1174
7.	(Soviet Union) CSKA Moscow	14	18	4	10	1156	1194
8.	(Netherlands) Nashua EBBC	14	16	2	12	1159	1306

== Final four ==
=== Semifinals ===
April 4, Olympiahalle, Munich

Team 1	Score	Team 2
Maccabi Elite Tel Aviv (Israel)	99–86	(Greece) Aris
FC Barcelona (Spain)	77–87	(Socialist Federal Republic of Yugoslavia) Jugoplastika

=== 3rd place game ===
April 6, Olympiahalle, Munich

Team 1	Score	Team 2
Aris (Greece)	88–71	(Spain) FC Barcelona

=== Final ===
April 6, Olympiahalle, Munich

Team 1	Score	Team 2
Maccabi Elite Tel Aviv (Israel)	69–75	(Socialist Federal Republic of Yugoslavia) Jugoplastika

1988–89 FIBA European Champions Cup
Champions

Jugoplastika
1st Title

=== Final standings ===
	Team
	(Socialist Federal Republic of Yugoslavia) Jugoplastika
2nd place, silver medalist(s)	(Israel) Maccabi Elite Tel Aviv
3rd place, bronze medalist(s)	(Greece) Aris
	(Spain) FC Barcelona

== Awards ==
=== FIBA European Champions Cup Final Four MVP ===
- (Socialist Federal Republic of Yugoslavia) Dino Rađa ( (Socialist Federal Republic of Yugoslavia) Jugoplastika)

=== FIBA European Champions Cup Finals Top Scorer ===
- (Israel) Doron Jamchi ( (Israel) Maccabi Elite Tel Aviv)
