= 2012–13 KK Crvena zvezda season =

KK Crvena zvezda
2012–13 season
- President: (Serbia) Nebojša Čović
- Head coach: (Serbia) Milivoje Lazić (until 4 October 2012) (Serbia) Vlada Vukoičić (4 October 2012–15 April 2013) (Montenegro) Dejan Radonjić (from 15 April 2013)
- Adriatic League: Runner-up
- Serbian League: Runner-up
- EuroCup: Last 16
- Serbian Cup: Winner
- Highest home attendance: 8,000 vs Galatasaray (16 January 2013)
- Lowest home attendance: 3,000 vs Szolnoki (3 November 2012))
- Average home attendance: 5,703

In the 2012–13 season, KK Crvena zvezda will compete in the Basketball League of Serbia, Kup Radivoja Koraća, Eurocup and Adriatic League.

== Players ==
=== Current roster ===
Note: Flags indicate national team eligibility at FIBA-sanctioned events. Players may hold other non-FIBA nationalities not displayed.

Crvena zvezda roster
Players
Coaches

Pos.	No.	Nat.	Name	Ht.	Wt.	Age
PG	4	(Serbia)	Đokić, Dejan	1.87 m (6 ft 2 in)	81 kg (179 lb)	37 – 11 August 1989
PG	5	(Serbia)	Cvetković, Aleksandar	1.83 m (6 ft 0 in)	77 kg (170 lb)	32 – 12 September 1993
F/C	7	(Serbia)	Subotić, Bojan	2.03 m (6 ft 8 in)	100 kg (220 lb)	35 – 17 December 1990
G	8	(Serbia)	Rakočević, Igor (C)	1.94 m (6 ft 4 in)	86 kg (190 lb)	48 – 29 March 1978
PF	9	(Serbia)	Mitrović, Luka	2.04 m (6 ft 8 in)	87 kg (192 lb)	33 – 21 March 1993
G/F	10	(Serbia)	Lazić, Branko	1.95 m (6 ft 5 in)	87 kg (192 lb)	37 – 12 January 1989
F	12	(Serbia)	Simonović, Marko	2.02 m (6 ft 8 in)	88 kg (194 lb)	40 – 30 May 1986
C	13	(Serbia)	Milovanović, Milan	2.07 m (6 ft 9 in)	96 kg (212 lb)	34 – 7 September 1991
F/C	14	(Serbia)	Savović, Boris	2.10 m (6 ft 11 in)	105 kg (231 lb)	39 – 18 June 1987
C	15	(Serbia)	Katić, Raško	2.08 m (6 ft 10 in)	102 kg (225 lb)	45 – 8 December 1980
SF	16	(Serbia)	Smiljanić, Ivan	1.99 m (6 ft 6 in)	89 kg (196 lb)	37 – 4 April 1989
G	18	(Serbia)	Radivojević, Vuk	1.96 m (6 ft 5 in)	90 kg (198 lb)	43 – 30 July 1983
G	20	(United States)	Nelson, DeMarcus	1.93 m (6 ft 4 in)	91 kg (201 lb)	40 – 2 November 1985
SF	21	(United States)	Scott, Michael	2.03 m (6 ft 8 in)	86 kg (190 lb)	40 – 13 March 1986

Head coach

- (Montenegro) Dejan Radonjić

Assistant coach(es)

- (Serbia) Milan Gurović
- (Serbia) Goran Topić
- (Serbia) Saša Kosović
- (Serbia) Nikola Birač

Athletic trainer(s)

- (Serbia) Aleksandar Lukman

Physiotherapist(s)

- (Serbia) Milorad Ćirić

Team manager

- (Serbia) Nebojša Ilić

Legend

- (C) Team captain
- Injured

- Roster
Updated: 1 May 2013

=== Depth chart ===
Pos.	Starting 5	Bench 1	Bench 2	Reserve
C	Raško Katić	Milan Milovanović
PF	Boris Savović	Bojan Subotić	Luka Mitrović
SF	Marko Simonović	Michael Scott	Ivan Smiljanić
SG	Igor Rakočević	Branko Lazić
PG	DeMarcus Nelson	Vuk Radivojević	Aleksandar Cvetković	Dejan Đokić

=== Roster changes ===
==== In ====
N	P	Nat.	Name	Age	Moving from	Source
12	SF	(Serbia)	Marko Simonović	26	(Germany) Alba Berlin	
14	PF	(Serbia)	Boris Savović	25	(Turkey) Galatasaray	
9	PF	(Serbia)	Luka Mitrović	19	(Serbia) Hemofarm	
6	C	(United States)	Elton Brown	29	(Turkey) Trabzonspor	
8	SG	(Serbia)	Igor Rakočević	34	(Italy) Montepaschi Siena	
13	C	(Serbia)	Milan Milovanović	21	(Serbia) Radnički FMP	
16	SF	(Serbia)	Ivan Smiljanić	23	(Serbia) Radnički FMP	
21	SF	(United States)	Morris Almond	27	(United States) Maine Red Claws	
15	C	(Serbia)	Raško Katić	32	(Serbia) Partizan	
20	PG	(United States)	DeMarcus Nelson	27	(France) Cholet Basket	
21	SF	(United States)	Michael Scott	26	(Belgium) Spirou Charleroi	
17	C	(North Macedonia)	Predrag Samardžiski	27	(Lithuania) Lietuvos rytas	

==== Out ====
N	P	Nat.	Name	Age	Moving to	Source
11	G	(Serbia)	Nemanja Nedović	21	(Lithuania) Lietuvos rytas	
33	F	(United States)	Omar Thomas	30	(Russia) Krasnye Krylia	
15	PF	(Serbia)	Sava Lešić	24	(Ukraine) Khimik	
7	PF	(Serbia)	Nikola Marković	23	(Serbia) Radnički FMP	
22	PF	(Serbia)	Bojan Radetić	24	(Romania) Piteşti	
55	C	(Serbia)	Petar Popović	33	(Germany) Artland Dragons	
19	C	(Serbia)	Uroš Nikolić	25	(North Macedonia) MZT Skopje	
9	C	(Serbia)	Mile Ilić	28	Free agent	
20	G	(Serbia)	Nikola Vasić	28	Free agent	
40	PG	(Serbia)	Bojan Popović	29	(Bulgaria) Lukoil Academic	
4	PG	(Serbia)	Filip Čović	23	(Serbia) Vojvodina Srbijagas	
21	SF	(United States)	Morris Almond	27	(United States) Iowa Energy	
35	SG	(Serbia)	Andreja Milutinović	23	Free agent	
6	C	(United States)	Elton Brown	29	Free agent	
17	C	(North Macedonia)	Predrag Samardžiski	27	Free agent	

=== Statistics ===
Legend
GP	Games played	GS	Games started	MPG	Minutes per game
FG%	Field-goal percentage	3FG%	3-point field-goal percentage	FT%	Free-throw percentage
RPG	Rebounds per game	APG	Assists per game	SPG	Steals per game
BPG	Blocks per game	PPG	Points per game	PIR	PIR per game

==== Adriatic League ====
#	Player	GP	GS	MPG	FG%	3FG%	FT%	RPG	APG	SPG	BPG	PPG	EFF
5	(Serbia) Aleksandar Cvetković	22	0	9.30	.542	.485	.690	1.3	1.0	0.6	0.1	3.2	3.4
6	(United States) Elton Brown	21	5	16.10	.628		.548	4.1	0.8	0.2	0.2	8.7	8.5
7	(Serbia) Bojan Subotić	24	21	11.40	.500	.214	.650	2.5	0.2	0.6	0.1	4.0	3.4
8	(Serbia) Igor Rakočević	25	25	26.60	.513	.314	.873	2.3	3.2	1.1	0.0	15.8	15.2
9	(Serbia) Luka Mitrović	14	0	5.10	.368		.500	1.2	0.1	0.1	0.0	1.4	1.4
10	(Serbia) Branko Lazić	22	2	12.50	.517	.444	.813	1.5	0.5	0.7	0.0	3.6	2.7
12	(Serbia) Marko Simonović	26	9	16.80	.480	.356	.579	2.5	0.3	0.4	0.1	5.8	4.2
13	(Serbia) Milan Milovanović	2	0	9.00	1.000		.500	1.0	0.0	0.0	0.0	5.0	5.5
14	(Serbia) Boris Savović	26	5	27.30	.593	.357	.719	8.3	1.0	0.5	0.2	12.4	17.4
15	(Serbia) Raško Katić	26	19	19.30	.511		.510	3.0	1.3	0.4	0.3	9.2	7.9
16	(Serbia) Ivan Smiljanić	2	0	1.00				0.0	0.0	0.0	0.0	0.0	0.0
17	(North Macedonia) Predrag Samardžiski	7	2	12.90	.480		.529	2.8	1.0	0.1	0.9	4.7	4.9
18	(Serbia) Vuk Radivojević	25	0	16.40	.488	.373	.806	2.2	2.6	0.8	0.2	5.0	7.0
20	(United States) DeMarcus Nelson	26	26	26.40	.553	.275	.627	3.5	3.5	1.0	0.3	8.5	11.7
21	(United States) Michael Scott	18	16	21.70	.500	.323	.517	4.1	1.3	0.8	0.3	6.2	7.2
	(United States) Morris Almond^{1}	5	0	18.00	.375	.385	.600	3.6	0.2	0.2	0.8	6.0	6.4
	(Serbia) Filip Čović^{1}	3	0	12.00	.750	.250	.500	0.0	1.3	0.3	0.0	4.0	2.7

Updated: 23 March 2013

1 Stats with Crvena zvezda (partial season).

==== Eurocup ====
#	Player	GP	GS	MPG	FG%	3FG%	FT%	RPG	APG	SPG	BPG	PPG	EFF
5	(Serbia) Aleksandar Cvetković	12	1	7.08	.222	.375	.375	0.8	0.5	0.5	0.0	1.7	-0.3
6	(United States) Elton Brown	10	2	17.18	.691		.730	4.8	1.2	0.1	0.1	10.3	13.7
7	(Serbia) Bojan Subotić	12	11	15.02	.586	.333	.917	3.4	0.3	0.3	0.0	5.8	5.9
8	(Serbia) Igor Rakočević	11	11	27.46	.573	.525	.808	2.7	2.8	0.5	0.0	19.5	18.5
9	(Serbia) Luka Mitrović	5	0	4.05	.667		.667	0.2	0.2	0.0	0.2	1.6	1.4
10	(Serbia) Branko Lazić	12	1	13.27	.625	.400	.778	1.1	0.3	0.3	0.0	3.8	2.6
12	(Serbia) Marko Simonović	12	3	10.54	.455	.176	.769	1.2	0.5	0.2	0.0	2.4	1.7
13	(Serbia) Milan Milovanović	1	0	2.36	1.000		1.000	0.0	0.0	0.0	0.0	3.0	2.0
14	(Serbia) Boris Savović	12	1	26.06	.491	.340	.714	6.6	1.4	0.4	0.4	10.6	12.2
15	(Serbia) Raško Katić	11	8	20.15	.538		.800	3.7	1.9	0.3	0.2	11.1	11.5
17	(North Macedonia) Predrag Samardžiski	3	2	14.54	.267		1.000	4.3	0.7	0.3	0.3	4.0	3.0
18	(Serbia) Vuk Radivojević	12	0	17.31	.429	.438	.667	2.2	2.8	0.4	0.1	6.2	5.6
20	(United States) DeMarcus Nelson	11	11	28.48	.508	.333	.741	4.4	4.1	1.3	0.1	9.2	11.4
21	(United States) Michael Scott	11	9	23.21	.533	.500	.750	3.5	0.5	0.5	0.5	9.4	8.5

Updated: 19 February 2013

==== Basketball League of Serbia ====
#	Player	GP	GS	MPG	FG%	3FG%	FT%	RPG	APG	SPG	BPG	PPG	EFF
4	(Serbia) Dejan Đokić	6	0	6.80	.000	.000	.500	0.5	0.5	0.3	0.0	0.2	-0.5
5	(Serbia) Aleksandar Cvetković	8	0	13.10	.270	.310	.850	1.4	1.6	1.3	0.0	3.6	5.0
7	(Serbia) Bojan Subotić	21	0	14.90	.540	.230	.780	2.6	0.3	0.5	0.1	4.7	3.4
8	(Serbia) Igor Rakočević	18	0	25.60	.550	.390	.790	2.1	2.8	0.6	0.1	16.2	15.4
9	(Serbia) Luka Mitrović	14	0	7.50	.450	.670	.670	2.2	0.4	0.0	0.1	2.1	3.1
10	(Serbia) Branko Lazić	21	0	17.50	.450	.333	.760	2.0	0.8	0.4	0.1	3.9	2.3
12	(Serbia) Marko Simonović	21	0	24.10	.580	.430	.680	2.8	0.7	0.7	0.5	8.9	8.1
13	(Serbia) Milan Milovanović	12	0	4.50	.290		.750	1.2	0.2	0.1	0.0	1.2	0.0
14	(Serbia) Boris Savović	19	0	26.10	.530	.380	.670	7.2	1.2	0.3	0.2	11.1	13.9
15	(Serbia) Raško Katić	21	0	25.50	.470		.570	4.8	1.7	0.8	0.3	13.0	11.0
18	(Serbia) Vuk Radivojević	19	0	15.70	.510	.220	.810	1.5	2.7	0.3	0.2	5.0	4.0
20	(United States) DeMarcus Nelson	19	0	28.80	.520	.410	.640	4.2	3.8	1.8	0.4	11.4	15.5
21	(United States) Michael Scott	19	0	14.30	.380	.130	.750	3.0	0.5	0.5	0.4	3.5	3.7
	(United States) Elton Brown^{2}	7	0	14.30	.500		.500	3.3	0.9	0.6	0.1	4.4	3.3

Updated: 12 June 2013

1 Stats with Crvena zvezda (partial season).

==== Awards ====
Basketball League of Serbia Weekly MVP

Week	Player	Efficiency
Super League week 5	(Serbia) Igor Rakočević	27
Super League week 7	(Serbia) Igor Rakočević	39
Super League week 14	(United States) DeMarcus Nelson	25
Play off game 1	(Serbia) Boris Savović	33
Play off game 5	(Serbia) Boris Savović	22

Radivoj Korać Cup MVP – (United States) DeMarcus Nelson
Radivoj Korać Cup Best Scorer – (United States) Michael Scott

== Competitions ==
=== Adriatic League ===
==== Standings ====
	Team	Pld	W	L	PF	PA	Diff	Points	%
1	(Bosnia and Herzegovina) Igokea	26	20	6	2013	1857	+156	46	.769
2	(Serbia) Crvena zvezda Telekom	26	18	8	2097	1889	+208	44	.692
3	(Serbia) Radnički	26	17	9	2102	1978	+124	43	.654
4	(Serbia) Partizan mt:s	26	16	10	1905	1832	+73	42	.615

Qualified for Final four
Relegated

Pld – Played; W – Won; L – Lost; PF – Points for; PA – Points against; Diff – Difference; Pts – Points.

As of 24 March 2013

==== Matches ====
29 September 2012
21:00

Report

Split (Croatia)	87–81	(Serbia) Crvena zvezda
Scoring by quarter: 26–21, 16–20, 20–20, 25–20
Pts: Mimica 32; Rebs: Vujčić, Sobin 5 Asts: Vujčić 7		Pts: Čović, Rakočević 10; Rebs: Katić 4 Asts: Katić 2

Arena Gripe
Split, Croatia
Attendance: 2,000
Referees: Javor Davor, Obradovic Petar, Majkic Mario

2 October 2012
18:00

Report

Zadar (Croatia)	98–81	(Serbia) Crvena zvezda
Scoring by quarter: 22–23, 30–21, 24–12, 22–25
Pts: Vrbanc 22; Rebs: Travis, Ramljak 5 Asts: Prostran 7		Pts: Rakočević 20; Rebs: Almond 8 Asts: Nelson 5

Krešimir Ćosić Hall
Zadar, Croatia
Attendance: 5,000
Referees: Pukl Saso, Boltauzer Matej, Vuckovic Marko

7 October 2012
18:00

Report

Crvena zvezda (Serbia)	87–76	(Slovenia) Olimpija
Scoring by quarter: 30–21, 21–18, 19–11, 17–26
Pts: Brown 24; Rebs: Savović 15; Asts: Nelson 7		Pts: Prepelič 18; Rebs: Omić 9 Asts: Rannikko 10

Pionir Hall
Belgrade, Serbia
Attendance: 5,500
Referees: Muhvic Dubravko, Dozai Srdjan, Milojevic Aleksandar

14 October 2012
17:00

Report

Cedevita (Croatia)	68–66	(Serbia) Crvena zvezda
Scoring by quarter: 15–13, 15–19, 23–9, 15–25
Pts: Šuput 18; Rebs: Šuput 7 Asts: Wright 3		Pts: Rakočević 18; Rebs: Savović 6 Asts: Four players 2

Dom Sportova
Zagreb, Croatia
Attendance: 1,200
Referees: Boltauzer Matej, Javor Damir, Obradovic Petar

19 October 2012
20:00

Report

Crvena zvezda (Serbia)	75–76	(Bosnia and Herzegovina) Igokea
Scoring by quarter: 16–17, 12–12, 18–30, 29–17
Pts: Rakočević 20; Rebs: Savović 10; Asts: Rakočević 5		Pts: Dozet 14; Rebs: Edwards 7 Asts: Hammonds 4

Pionir Hall
Belgrade, Serbia
Attendance: 5,000
Referees: Pukl Saso, Lovsin Andrej, Koljensic Milos

27 October 2012
17:00

Report

MZT Skopje (North Macedonia)	60–75	(Serbia) Crvena zvezda
Scoring by quarter: 22–20, 14–27, 11–9, 13–19
Pts: Gečevski, Čekovski 12; Rebs: Čekovski 8 Asts: Mijajlovič 3		Pts: Rakočević, Katić 16; Rebs: Katić 10; Asts: Nelson 4

Boris Trajkovski Sports Center
Skopje, Republic of Macedonia
Attendance: 3,500
Referees: Dozai Srdjan, Herceg Sinisa, Petek Saso

3 November 2012
19:00

Report

Crvena zvezda (Serbia)	103–74	(Hungary) Szolnoki Olaj
Scoring by quarter: 27–23, 30–20, 20–16, 26–15
Pts: Brown 17; Rebs: Savović 13; Asts: Radivojević 4		Pts: Šehović 15; Rebs: Báder 7 Asts: Horváth 4

Pionir Hall
Belgrade, Serbia
Attendance: 3,000
Referees: Obradovic Petar, Zurapovic Ademir, Bijedic Haris

11 November 2012
21:00

Report

Partizan (Serbia)	78–92	(Serbia) Crvena zvezda
Scoring by quarter: 22–28, 17–25, 14–19, 25–20
Pts: Bertans 23; Rebs: Westermann, Lučić 5 Asts: Westermann 5		Pts: Nelson 20; Rebs: Savović 10; Asts: Radivojević 6

Pionir Hall
Belgrade, Serbia
Attendance: 5,000
Referees: Pukl Saso, Radovic Sreten, Vojinovic Milija

18 November 2012
19:00

Report

Crvena zvezda (Serbia)	79–61	(Slovenia) Krka
Scoring by quarter: 20–13, 16–17, 22–13, 21–18
Pts: Rakočević, Brown 15; Rebs: Brown 12; Asts: Five players 2		Pts: Lorbek, Vladović 11; Rebs: Lalić 8 Asts: Vladović 5

Pionir Hall
Belgrade, Serbia
Attendance: 6,500
Referees: Herceg Sinisa, Rutesic Zdravko, Radojkovic Josip

24 November 2012
17:00

Report

Cibona (Croatia)	63–71	(Serbia) Crvena zvezda
Scoring by quarter: 16–21, 10–15, 19–19, 18–16
Pts: Strawberry 19; Rebs: Hamilton 14; Asts: Hamilton 3		Pts: Rakočević 13; Rebs: Savović 14; Asts: Radivojević 7

Dražen Petrović Basketball Hall
Zagreb, Croatia
Attendance: 3,000
Referees: Pukl Saso, Petek Saso, Milojevic Aleksandar

2 December 2012
17:00

Report

Crvena zvezda (Serbia)	69–57	(Bosnia and Herzegovina) Široki
Scoring by quarter: 20–15, 13–15, 19–14, 17–13
Pts: Brown 12; Rebs: Savović, Scott 6 Asts: Nelson 5		Pts: Planinić 22; Rebs: Planinić 9 Asts: Naletilić 5

Pionir Hall
Belgrade, Serbia
Attendance: 6,200
Referees: Radovic Sreten, Vovk Tomislav, Cziffra Csaba

8 December 2012
19:00

Report

Budućnost (Montenegro)	72–63	(Serbia) Crvena zvezda
Scoring by quarter: 18–14, 20–12, 15–10, 19–27
Pts: Lee 22; Rebs: Milošević, Popović 7 Asts: Milošević 5		Pts: Rakočević 18; Rebs: Savović 10; Asts: Rakočević 4

Morača Sports Center
Podgorica, Montenegro
Attendance: 3,900
Referees: Muhvic Dubravko, Boltauzer Matej, Petek Saso

15 December 2012
19:00

Report

Crvena zvezda (Serbia)	87–73	(Serbia) Radnički
Scoring by quarter: 21–27, 21–19, 24–13, 21–14
Pts: Rakočević 20; Rebs: Subotić 12; Asts: Rakočević 6		Pts: White 18; Rebs: White 8 Asts: Marković 4

Pionir Hall
Belgrade, Serbia
Attendance: Dozai Srdjan, Herceg Sinisa, Radojkovic Josip
Referees: 4,000

18 December 2012
20:00

Report

Crvena zvezda (Serbia)	94–67	(Croatia) Split
Scoring by quarter: 16–21, 26–16, 26–15, 26–15
Pts: Rakočević, Savović 13; Rebs: Radivojević, Savović 6 Asts: Scott 6		Pts: Sobin 14; Rebs: Kraljević 11; Asts: Subotić 6

Pionir Hall
Belgrade, Serbia
Attendance: 3,500
Referees: Obradovic Petar, Bijedic Haris, Milojevic Aleksandar

22 December 2012
19:00

Report

Crvena zvezda (Serbia)	88–79	(Croatia) Zadar
Scoring by quarter: 21–22, 23–15, 18–21, 26–21
Pts: Rakočević 22; Rebs: Scott 9 Asts: Nelson 6		Pts: Travis 25; Rebs: Travis 11; Asts: Prostran, Travis 3

Pionir Hall
Belgrade, Serbia
Attendance: 7,000
Referees: Javor Damir, Vojinovic Radomir, Petek Saso

5 January 2013
19:00

Report

Olimpija (Slovenia)	56–70	(Serbia) Crvena zvezda
Scoring by quarter: 14–17, 12–19, 14–16, 16–18
Pts: Baynes 13; Rebs: Baynes 11; Asts: Seven players 1		Pts: Rakočević 23; Rebs: Savović 13; Asts: Radivojević 4

Arena Stožice
Maribor, Slovenia
Attendance: 5,700
Referees: Radovic Sreten, Muhvic Dubravko, Rutesic Zdravko

13 January 2013
17:00

Report

Crvena zvezda (Serbia)	90–65	(Croatia) Cedevita
Scoring by quarter: 28–19, 20–11, 14–19, 28–16
Pts: Savović 14; Rebs: Three players 6 Asts: Radivojević 8		Pts: Wright 22; Rebs: Suton, Kitchen 5 Asts: Wright 6

Pionir Hall
Belgrade, Serbia
Attendance: 7,000
Referees: Pukl Saso, Boltauzer Matej, Vojinovic Radomir

19 January 2013
19:00

Report

Igokea (Bosnia and Herzegovina)	80–77	(Serbia) Crvena zvezda
Scoring by quarter: 19–19, 27–21, 18–18, 16–19
Pts: Brkić 15; Rebs: Joksimović, Brkić 8 Asts: Hammonds, Štemberger 5		Pts: Savović 16; Rebs: Savović 11; Asts: Rakočević 5

Laktaši Sports Hall
Laktaši, Bosnia and Herzegovina
Attendance: 3,500
Referees: Dozai Srdjan, Herceg Sinisa, Petek Saso

27 January 2013
19:00

Report

Crvena zvezda (Serbia)	87–72	(North Macedonia) MZT Skopje
Scoring by quarter: 26–20, 34–18, 14–22, 13–12
Pts: Rakočević 25; Rebs: Savović 7 Asts: Cvetković, Rakočević 5		Pts: Gečevski 12; Rebs: Gečevski 7 Asts: Bakić 5

Pionir Hall
Belgrade, Serbia
Attendance: 3,159
Referees: Radovic Sreten, Rutesic Zdravko, Bijedic Haris

2 February 2013
17:00

Report

Szolnoki Olaj (Hungary)	83–96	(Serbia) Crvena zvezda
Scoring by quarter: 19–21, 30–25, 17–24, 17–26
Pts: Horváth 13; Rebs: Bell 8 Asts: Florence 4		Pts: Rakočević 22; Rebs: Samardžiski, Savović 5 Asts: Radivojević, Nelson 7

Tiszaligeti Sportcsarnok
Szolnok, Hungary
Attendance: 1,480
Referees: Herceg Sinisa, Anzulovic Tonci, Vuckovic Marko

17 February 2013
21:00

Report

Crvena zvezda (Serbia)	84–76	(Serbia) Partizan
Scoring by quarter: 23–24, 14–22, 23–11, 24–19
Pts: Rakočević, Katić 20; Rebs: Savović 8 Asts: Rakočević 6		Pts: Bertāns 23; Rebs: Lauvergne 6 Asts: Westermann 6

Pionir Hall
Belgrade, Serbia
Attendance: 5,500
Referees: Pukl Saso, Dozai Srdjan, Herceg Sinisa

24 February 2013
19:00

Report

Krka (Slovenia)	52–57	(Serbia) Crvena zvezda
Scoring by quarter: 19–14, 13–7, 6–19, 14–17
Pts: Lučić 11; Rebs: Vladović, Klobučar 9 Asts: Klobučar 5		Pts: Rakočević 14; Rebs: Radivojević, Rakočević 6 Asts: Nelson 4

Leon Štukelj Hall
Novo Mesto, Slovenia
Attendance: 1,200
Referees: Radovic Sreten, Vovk Tomislav, Hordov Tomislav

2 March 2013
17:00

Report

Crvena zvezda (Serbia)	97–95	(Croatia) Cibona
Scoring by quarter: 27–25, 23–26, 18–22, 29–22
Pts: Rakočević 21; Rebs: Savović 7 Asts: Rakočević 9		Pts: Strawberry 31; Rebs: Šarić 7 Asts: Blassingame 9

Pionir Hall
Belgrade, Serbia
Attendance: 4,000
Referees: Obradovic Petar, Petek Saso, Rutesic Zdravko

11 March 2013
20:30

Report

Široki (Bosnia and Herzegovina)	78–74	(Serbia) Crvena zvezda
Scoring by quarter: 24–13, 24–21, 16–17, 14–23
Pts: Šutalo 21; Rebs: Šakić 8 Asts: Four players 2		Pts: Rakočević 15; Rebs: Savović 8 Asts: Rakočević 5

Pecara
Široki Brijeg, Bosnia and Herzegovina
Attendance: 4,000
Referees: Pukl Saso, Javor Damir, Lovsin Andrej

16 March 2013
19:00

Report

Crvena zvezda (Serbia)	79–63	(Montenegro) Budućnost
Scoring by quarter: 19–15, 19–11, 13–18, 28–19
Pts: Rakočević 16; Rebs: Savović 12; Asts: Rakočević 4		Pts: Popović 15; Rebs: Milošević 6 Asts: Bost 3

Pionir Hall
Belgrade, Serbia
Attendance: 6,000
Referees: Boltauzer Matej, Herceg Sinisa, Vovk Tomislav

23 March 2013
20:00

Report

Radnički (Serbia)	80–75	(Serbia) Crvena zvezda
Scoring by quarter: 24–17, 19–16, 12–20, 25–22
Pts: White 14; Rebs: Birčević 10; Asts: Miljenović 6		Pts: Simonović 20; Rebs: Savović 7 Asts: Nelson 9

Hala Jezero
Kragujevac, Serbia
Attendance: 3,000
Referees: Radovic Sreten, Vojinovic Milija, Zurapovic Ademir

==== Semifinal ====
25 April 2013
17:00

Report

Crvena Zvezda (Serbia)	79–78	(Serbia) Radnički
Scoring by quarter: 20–27, 21–13, 21–20, 17–18
Pts: Katić 22; Rebs: Savović 11; Asts: Nelson 6		Pts: Ćapin 25; Rebs: White 7 Asts: Ćapin, Krstović 4

Laktaši Sports Hall
Laktaši, Bosnia and Herzegovina
Attendance: 3,000
Referees: Belosevic Ilija, Dozai Srdjan, Herceg Sinisa

==== Final ====
27 April 2013
20:30

Report

Partizan (Serbia)	71–63	(Serbia) Crvena Zvezda
Scoring by quarter: 14–18, 11–14, 25–13, 21–18
Pts: Westermann, Bertans 15; Rebs: Lauvergne, Gagić 6 Asts: Westermann 3		Pts: Katić 19; Rebs: Katić 12; Asts: Rakočević, Nelson 3

Laktaši Sports Hall
Laktaši, Bosnia and Herzegovina
Attendance: 3,000
Referees: Pukl Saso, Belosevic Ilija, Boltauzer Matej

=== Eurocup ===
==== Regular season ====
	Team	Pld	W	L	PF	PA	Diff	Tie-break
1.	(Serbia) Crvena Zvezda Telekom	6	5	1	556	515	+41	
2.	(Spain) Cajasol Sevilla	6	3	3	483	471	+12	
3.	(France) Orléans Loiret	6	2	4	465	478	–13	2–0
4.	(Italy) Dinamo Sassari	6	2	4	516	556	–40	0–2

7 November 2012
19:15

Report

Crvena zvezda (Serbia)	93–73	(France) Orléans Loiret
Scoring by quarter: 21–13, 22–24, 29–23, 21–13
Pts: Scott 22; Rebs: Savović 9 Asts: Katić 6		Pts: Green 17; Rebs: Green 7 Asts: Young 5

Pionir Hall, Belgrade
Attendance: 7,500
Referees: Emin Moğulkoç (TUR), Miroslav Tomov (BUL), Omer Esteron (ISR)

14 November 2012
20:30

Report

Cajasol Sevilla (Spain)	93–95 (OT)	(Serbia) Crvena Zvezda
Scoring by quarter: 20–17, 10–16, 15–26, 38–24, Overtime: 10–12
Pts: Asbury 26; Rebs: Asbury, Dozier 6 Asts: Asbury, Holland 3		Pts: Rakočević 25; Rebs: Subotić 8 Asts: Nelson 5

Palacio Municipal de Deportes San Pablo, Seville
Attendance: 2,500
Referees: Joseph Bissang (FRA), Renaud Geller (BEL), Tomas Trawicki (POL)

21 November 2012
19:15

Report

Crvena Zvezda Diva (Serbia)	116–104	(Italy) Dinamo Sassari
Scoring by quarter: 31–33, 26–21, 33–24, 26–26
Pts: Rakočević 28; Rebs: Brown 7 Asts: Rakočević 7, Subotić 7		Pts: Thornton 33; Rebs: Ignerski 6 Asts: Diener 15

Pionir Hall, Belgrade
Attendance: 7,000
Referees: Robert Lottermoser (GER), Regis Bardera (FRA), Sergio Silva (POR)

28 November 2012
20:45

Report

Dinamo Sassari (Italy)	94–97	(Serbia) Crvena Zvezda Diva
Scoring by quarter: 20–31, 23–22, 26–25, 25–19
Pts: T. Diener 21; Rebs: Ignerski 7 Asts: T. Diener, D. Diener 7		Pts: Nelson 20; Rebs: Brown 8 Asts: Nelson 3

Palaserradimigni, Sassari
Attendance: 2,700
Referees: Marek Cmikiewicz (POL), Elias Koromilas (GRE), Petros Papapetrou (GRE)

5 December 2012
20:30

Report

Orléans Loiret (France)	75–85	(Serbia) Crvena Zvezda
Scoring by quarter: 19–22, 24–15, 15–31, 17–17
Pts: Young 25; Rebs: Kozan 5 Asts: Pellin 7		Pts: Subotić 24; Rebs: Scott 9 Asts: Nelson 5

Palais des Sports, Orléans
Attendance: 3,500
Referees: Roberto Chiari (ITA), Anna Cardus (ESP), Carlos Cortes (ESP)

12 December 2012
20:00

Report

Crvena Zvezda Diva (Serbia)	70–76	(Spain) Cajasol Sevilla
Scoring by quarter: 12–25, 24–21, 16–15, 18–15
Pts: Katić 12; Rebs: Savović 8 Asts: Katić 5		Pts: Bogdanović 16; Rebs: Triguero 7 Asts: Satoranský 8

Pionir Hall, Belgrade
Attendance: 5,500
Referees: Christos Christodoulou (GRE), Joseph Bissang (FRA), Oskars Lucis (LAT)

==== Last 16 ====
	Team	Pld	W	L	PF	PA	Diff	Tie-break
1.	(Russia) BC UNICS Kazan	6	4	2	461	443	+18	
2.	(Germany) Ratiopharm Ulm	6	3	3	516	496	+20	1–1 (+5)
3.	(Turkey) Galatasaray Medical Park	6	3	3	459	459	0	1–1 (–5)
4.	(Serbia) Crvena Zvezda Telekom	6	2	4	476	514	–38	

9 January 2013
19:30

Report

Ratiopharm Ulm (Germany)	95–100	(Serbia) Crvena Zvezda Telekom
Scoring by quarter: 22–23, 17–25, 19–21, 37–31
Pts: Bryant 20; Rebs: Bryant 12; Asts: Günther 4		Pts: Rakočević 32; Rebs: Brown 10; Asts: Radivojević 7

Arena Ulm/Neu-Ulm, Neu-Ulm
Attendance: 6,000
Referees: Jose Ramon Garcia Ortiz (ESP), Oscar Perea (ESP), Ersan Kartal (TUR)

16 January 2013
19:30

Report

Crvena Zvezda Telekom (Serbia)	74–91	(Turkey) Galatasaray Medical Park
Scoring by quarter: 18–22, 24–27, 18–22, 14–20
Pts: Rakočević 16; Rebs: Savović 9 Asts: Radivojević, Rakočević 3		Pts: Gordon 22; Rebs: N'Dong 7 Asts: Hawkins 5

Pionir Hall, Belgrade
Attendance: 8,000
Referees: Jose Martin (ESP), Gianluca Mattioli (ITA), Marius Ciulin (ROM)

23 January 2013
16:00

Report

BC UNICS Kazan (Russia)	78–59	(Serbia) Crvena Zvezda Telekom
Scoring by quarter: 10-16, 26-19, 24-17, 18-7
Pts: Chatman 20; Rebs: Veremeenko 6 Asts: Eidson, Chatman 5		Pts: Brown 13; Rebs: three players 5 Asts: Nelson 5

Basket-Hall Arena, Kazan
Attendance: 2,700
Referees: Guerrino Cerebuch (ITA), Seffi Shemmesh (ISR), Panagiotis Anastopoulos (GRE)

30 January 2013
19:30

Report

Crvena Zvezda Telekom (Serbia)	81–73	(Russia) BC UNICS Kazan
Scoring by quarter: 20–26, 21–17, 22–7, 18–23
Pts: Rakočević 21; Rebs: Savović 8 Asts: Rakočević, Nelson 3		Pts: Chatman 18; Rebs: Kaimakoglou, Vougioukas 6 Asts: Kaimakoglou 5

Pionir Hall, Belgrade
Attendance: 7,000
Referees: Tomas Jasevicius (LTU), Sergiy Chebyshev (UKR), Miroslav Tomov (BUL)

13 February 2013
19:30

Report

Crvena Zvezda Telekom (Serbia)	78–92	(Germany) Ratiopharm Ulm
Scoring by quarter: 19–22, 19–24, 18–21, 22–25
Pts: Rakočević 24; Rebs: Radivojević 7 Asts: Radivojević 4		Pts: Ray 26; Rebs: Esterkamp, Nankivil 6 Asts: Günther 6

Pionir Hall, Belgrade
Attendance: 7,000
Referees: Paolo Taurino (ITA), Luis Lopes (POR), Sergiy Zashchuk (UKR)

19 February 2013
20:00

Report

Galatasaray Medical Park (Turkey)	85–84	(Serbia) Crvena Zvezda Telekom
Scoring by quarter: 27–20, 22–22, 16–25, 20–17
Pts: Markoishvili, Arslan 17; Rebs: Aldemir 11; Asts: Korkmaz 4		Pts: Savović 20; Rebs: Savović 13; Asts: Radivojević 8

Abdi İpekçi Arena, Istanbul
Attendance: 1,100
Referees: Christos Christodoulou (GRE), Marcin Kowalski (POL), Ioannis Foufis (GRE)

=== Basketball League of Serbia ===
==== Standings ====
Pos	Team	Total						
Pos	Team	P	W	L	F	A	D	Pts
1	Partizan mt:s	14	12	2	1195	935	+260	26
2	Crvena zvezda Telekom	14	11	3	1143	1015	+128	25
3	Mega Vizura	14	9	5	1142	1104	+38	23

P=Matches played, W=Matches won, L=Matches lost, F=Points for, A=Points against, D=Points difference, Pts=Points

Qualification for Playoff Stage

As of 25 May 2013

=== Kup Radivoja Koraća ===
==== Quarterfinal ====
8 February 2013
21:00

Report

Crvena zvezda	97–72	Vojvodina
Scoring by quarter: 27–20, 24–22, 24–18, 22–12
Pts: Rakočević, Nelson 19; Rebs: Savović 10; Asts: Radivojević 6		Pts: Marković 22; Rebs: Zeković 8 Asts: Three players 3

Hala Jezero
Kragujevac, Serbia
Attendance: 2,000
Referees: Branislav Mrdak, Ivan Stefanovic, Uros Nikolic

==== Semifinal ====
9 February 2013
21:00

Report

Radnički	64–90	Crvena zvezda
Scoring by quarter: 17–25, 12–19, 25–23, 10–23
Pts: White 21; Rebs: White 9 Asts: Krstović, White 2		Pts: Rakočević 21; Rebs: Savović, Scott 7 Asts: Radivojević 8

Hala Jezero
Kragujevac, Serbia
Attendance: 4,000
Referees: Ilija Belošević, Milivoje Jovčić, Saša Maričić

==== Final ====
10 February 2013
21:00

Report

Partizan	69–78	Crvena zvezda
Scoring by quarter: 22–25, 16–16, 11–8, 20–29
Pts: Lučić 17; Rebs: Musli 14; Asts: Westermann 5		Pts: Rakočević, Scott 20; Rebs: Savović 10; Asts: Katić, Rakočević 4

Hala Jezero
Kragujevac, Serbia
Attendance: 4,000
Referees: Ilija Belošević, Milija Vojinović, Saša Maričić
