= 2012–13 Radivoj Korać Cup =

Radivoj Korać Cup 2013
- League: Radivoj Korać Cup
- Sport: Basketball
- Duration: 7–10 February 2013
- Top scorer: (United States) Michael Scott
- Finals champions: Crvena Zvezda
- Runners-up: Partizan
- Finals MVP: (United States) DeMarcus Nelson

Radivoj Korać Cup seasons
- ← 2011–12 2013–14 →

The 2012–13 Radivoj Korać Cup season is the eleventh season of the Serbian national basketball cup tournament. The competition started on February 7 and concluded with the Final on February 10, 2013.

== Teams ==
Eight teams competed in this years cup.

Seeded	Unseeded
Radnički	Sloboda
Crvena Zvezda	Vršac
Partizan	Vojvodina Srbijagas
Mega Vizura	Metalac

== Bracket ==
Quarterfinals; February 7 and 8		Semifinals; February 9		Final; February 10
Mega Vizura	82
Vršac	79	Mega Vizura	77
Partizan	73	Partizan	87
Sloboda	50			Partizan	69
Radnički	95			Crvena Zvezda	78
Metalac	60	Radnički	64
Crvena Zvezda	97	Crvena Zvezda	90
Vojvodina Srbijagas	72

=== Quarterfinals ===
7 February 2013
18:30

Report

Mega Vizura	82–79	Vršac
Scoring by quarter: 16–12, 25–16, 5–20, 36–31
Pts: Micić 16; Rebs: Marjanović 16; Asts: Micić 7		Pts: Radović 29; Rebs: Radović 11; Asts: Vuksanović, Milošević 4

Hala Jezero
Kragujevac, Serbia
Attendance: 700
Referees: Aleksandar Glišić, Vladimir Jevtović, Nemanja Ninković

7 February 2013
21:00

Report

Partizan	73–50	Sloboda
Scoring by quarter: 23–13, 16–11, 21–11, 13–15
Pts: Westermann, Gordon 11; Rebs: Musli 8 Asts: Milosavljević 4		Pts: Arnautović 11; Rebs: Stefanović, Ljubojević 5 Asts: Vasić 4

Hala Jezero
Kragujevac, Serbia
Attendance: 1,000
Referees: Časlav Čukalović, Marko Pecelj, Radoš Arsenijević

8 February 2013
18:30

Report

Radnički	95–60	Metalac
Scoring by quarter: 28–19, 22–15, 14–11, 34–15
Pts: Mijatović 16; Rebs: Birčević 9 Asts: Miljenović 6		Pts: Balmazović 15; Rebs: Živanović 7 Asts: Živanović 5

Hala Jezero
Kragujevac, Serbia
Attendance: 2,000
Referees: Uroš Obrknežević, Milan Mažić, Duško Sodlar

8 February 2013
21:00

Report

Crvena zvezda	97–72	Vojvodina
Scoring by quarter: 27–20, 24–22, 24–18, 22–12
Pts: Rakočević, Nelson 19; Rebs: Savović 10; Asts: Radivojević 6		Pts: Marković 22; Rebs: Zeković 8 Asts: Three players 3

Hala Jezero
Kragujevac, Serbia
Attendance: 2,000
Referees: Branislav Mrdak, Ivan Stefanović, Uroš Nikolić

=== Semifinals ===
9 February 2013
17:00

Report

Mega Vizura	77–87	Partizan
Scoring by quarter: 21–21, 19–18, 19–21, 18–27
Pts: Micić 23; Rebs: Marjanović 13; Asts: Micić 7		Pts: Gagić 21; Rebs: Gordon 10; Asts: Milosavljević 4

Hala Jezero
Kragujevac, Serbia
Attendance: 1,500
Referees: Milija Vojinović, Dragan Nešković, Marko Juras

9 February 2013
21:00

Report

Radnički	64–90	Crvena zvezda
Scoring by quarter: 17–25, 12–19, 25–23, 10–23
Pts: White 21; Rebs: White 9 Asts: Krstović, White 2		Pts: Rakočević 21; Rebs: Savović, Scott 7 Asts: Radivojević 8

Hala Jezero
Kragujevac, Serbia
Attendance: 4,000
Referees: Ilija Belošević, Milivoje Jovčić, Saša Maričić

=== Final ===
10 February 2013
21:00

Report

Partizan	69–78	Crvena zvezda
Scoring by quarter: 22–25, 16–16, 11–8, 20–29
Pts: Lučić 17; Rebs: Musli 14; Asts: Westermann 5		Pts: Rakočević, Scott 20; Rebs: Savović 10; Asts: Katić, Rakočević 4

Hala Jezero
Kragujevac, Serbia
Attendance: 4,000
Referees: Ilija Belošević, Milija Vojinović, Saša Maričić

Radivoj Korać Cup 2013 Champions

Crvena zvezda
6th Cup
