= 2010–11 Basketball League of Serbia =

- League: Basketball League of Serbia
- Sport: Basketball
- Duration: October 9, 2010 - March 10, 2011
- TV partner: RTS

First League
- Season champions: FMP Železnik
- Season MVP: (Serbia) Nenad Šulović (Napredak Kruševac)

Super League
- Season champions: Partizan
- Season MVP: (Serbia) Marko Ljubičić (Metalac)
- Top scorer: (Serbia) Uroš Nikolić (Crvena zvezda Beograd)

Playoff stage
- Finals champions: Partizan
- Runners-up: Hemofarm
- Finals MVP: (United States) Curtis Jerrells (Partizan)

Basketball League of Serbia seasons
- ← 2009–10 2011–12 →

The 2010–11 Basketball League of Serbia season was the 5th season of the Basketball League of Serbia, the highest professional basketball league in Serbia. It was also 67th national championship played by Serbian clubs inclusive of nation's previous incarnations as Yugoslavia and Serbia & Montenegro. The 182-game regular season (26 games for each of the 14 teams) began on Saturday, October 9, 2010, and ended on Sunday, March 12, 2011.

== Teams for 2010–11 season ==
Team	City	Arena	Capacity
Partizan mt:s*	Belgrade	Pionir Hall	8.150
Hemofarm*	Vršac	Millennium Center	5.000
Red Star*	Belgrade	Pionir Hall	8.150
Radnički*	Kragujevac	Lake Hall	4.000
FMP Železnik	Železnik	FMP Hall	3.000
Vojvodina Srbijagas	Novi Sad	Spens Sports Center	11.500
Metalac	Valjevo	Valjevo Sports Hall	1.500
Proleter Naftagas	Zrenjanin	Medison Hall	3.500
OKK Beograd	Belgrade	Sport Eko Hall	1.000
Tamiš	Pančevo	Strelište Sports Hall	1.100
Napredak Rubin	Kruševac	Kruševac Sports Hall	2.500
Sloboda	Užice	Veliki Park Sports Hall	2.200
Sloga	Kraljevo	Kraljevo Sports Hall	1.500
Borac	Čačak	Borac Sports Hall	3.000
Novi Sad	Novi Sad	Spens Sports Center	1.100
Mega Vizura	Belgrade	Vizura Sports Center	1.500
Superfund	Belgrade	New Belgrade Sports Hall	5.000
Crnokosa	Kosjerić	Kosjerić Sports Hall	1.000

Teams from Adriatic League
Teams from Balkan International Basketball League

== Regular season ==
=== First League standings ===
Pos	Team	P	W	L	F	A	D	Pts
1	FMP Železnik	26	24	2	2320	1832	+488	50
2	OKK Beograd	26	19	7	2166	1963	+203	45
3	Metalac	26	18	8	2050	1937	+113	44
4	Mega Vizura	26	15	11	2297	2266	+31	41
5	Tamiš	26	15	11	1880	1807	+73	41
6	Napredak Rubin	26	12	14	1994	1990	+4	38
7	Novi Sad	26	12	14	2080	2085	-5	38
8	Sloga	26	12	14	2103	2157	-54	34
9	Sloboda	26	12	14	1993	2091	-98	38
10	Vojvodina Srbijagas	26	12	14	1844	1956	-112	38
11	Borac	26	11	15	1930	2030	-100	37
12	Proleter Naftagas	26	10	16	2071	2184	-113	36
13	Crnokosa	26	9	17	2048	2191	-143	35
14	Superfund	26	1	25	1848	2135	-287	26

P=Matches played, W=Matches won, L=Matches lost, F=Points for, A=Points against, D=Points difference, Pts=Points

Qualification for Super League
Relegation to B League

=== Super League standings ===
Pos	Team	Total						
		P	W	L	F	A	D	Pts
1	Partizan mt:s	14	13	1	1209	1021	+188	27
2	Hemofarm	14	10	4	1132	1067	+ 65	24
3	Radnički Kragujevac	14	8	6	1160	1117	+43	22
4	FMP Železnik	14	6	8	1153	1151	+2	20
5	Red Star	14	6	8	1226	1249	-23	20
6	Metalac	14	6	8	1089	1115	-26	20
7	OKK Beograd	14	4	10	1049	1175	-126	18
8	Mega Vizura	14	3	11	1068	1191	-123	17

P=Matches played, W=Matches won, L=Matches lost, F=Points for, A=Points against, D=Points difference, Pts=Points

Qualification for Adriatic League

==== Schedule and results of Super League ====
1. round
Radnički Kragujevac - Red Star	90-82
OKK Beograd - FMP	79-75
Partizan - Metalac	78-67
Mega Vizura - Hemofarm	62-81

2. round
Red Star - Hemofarm	89-97
Metalac - Mega Vizura	80-74
FMP - Partizan	67-76
Radnički Kragujevac - OKK Beograd	74-62

3. round
OKK Beograd - Red Star	89-88
Partizan - Radnički Kragujevac	91-96
Mega Vizura - FMP	77-71
Hemofarm - Metalac	78-67

4. round
Red Star - Metalac	91-81
FMP - Hemofarm	99-86
Radnički Kragujevac - Mega Vizura	82-72
OKK Beograd - Partizan	72-85

5. round
Partizan - Red Star	118-77
Mega Vizura - OKK Beograd	79-82
Hemofarm - Radnički Kragujevac	67-63
Metalac - FMP	81-77

6. round
Red Star - FMP	90-79
Radnički Kragujevac - Metalac	87-75
OKK Beograd - Hemofarm	74-88
Partizan - Mega Vizura	100-82

7. round
Mega Vizura - Red Star	81-84
Hemofarm - Partizan	76-90
Metalac - OKK Beograd	89-62
FMP - Radnički Kragujevac	87-83

8. round
Red Star - Radnički Kragujevac	95-85
FMP - OKK Beograd	87-78
Metalac - Partizan	66-73
Hemofarm - Mega Vizura	75-66

9. round
Hemofarm - Red Star	86-64
Mega Vizura - Metalac	77-69
Partizan - FMP	78-62
OKK Beograd - Radnički Kragujevac	85-91

10. round
Red Star - OKK Beograd	90-70
Radnički Kragujevac - Partizan	74-76
FMP - Mega Vizura	96-71
Metalac - Hemofarm	70-86

11. round
Metalac - Red Star	106-94
Hemofarm - FMP	100-92
Mega Vizura-Radnički Kragujevac	106-103
Partizan - OKK Beograd	84-56

12. round
Red Star - Partizan	92-95
OKK Beograd - Mega Vizura	85-78
Radnički Kragujevac - Hemofarm	67-63
FMP - Metalac	86-76

13. round
FMP - Red Star	97-87
Metalac - Radnički Kragujevac	78-76
Hemofarm - OKK Beograd	83-79
Mega Vizura - Partizan	68-80

14. round
Red Star - Mega Vizura	103-75
Partizan - Hemofarm	85-66
OKK Beograd - Metalac	76-84
Radnički Kragujevac - FMP	89-78

== Playoff stage ==
=== Semifinals ===
Game 1

24 May 2011
20:00

Report

Partizan mt:s	100–71	FMP Železnik
Scoring by quarter: 27–20, 26–20, 26–16, 21–15
Pts: Veselý 16; Rebs: Veselý 6 Asts: Jerrells 9		Pts: Radivojević 19; Rebs: Smiljanić 5 Asts: Radivojević 7
Partizan leads 1–0

Pionir Hall
Belgrade, Serbia
Referees: Mrdak Branislav, Veskovic Vladimir, Licina Miodrag

24 May 2011
18:00

Report

Hemofarm STADA	92–89 (OT)	Radnički Kragujevac
Scoring by quarter: 17–27, 22–22, 14–15, 29–18, Overtime: 10–7
Pts: Anđušić 20; Rebs: Savović 12; Asts: Anđušić 5		Pts: Lee 25; Rebs: Lee 12; Asts: Čakarević 7
Hemofarm leads 1–0

Millennium Center
Vršac, Serbia
Referees: Vojinovic Milija, Maricic Sasa, Stefanovic Ivan

Game 2

26 May 2011
18:00

Report

FMP Železnik	84–75	Partizan mt:s
Scoring by quarter: 12–21, 30–24, 17–20, 25–10
Pts: Čović 18; Rebs: Bowman 6 Asts: Čović, Ilić 3		Pts: Katić 19; Rebs: Gist 9 Asts: Jerrells, Gist 3
Series tied 1–1

FMP Hall
Belgrade, Serbia
Referees: Vojinovic Milija, Obrknezevic Uros, Milojkovic Milorad

26 May 2011
20:00

Report

Radnički Kragujevac	81–80	Hemofarm STADA
Scoring by quarter: 14–24, 26–18, 12–16, 29–22
Pts: Marković 26; Rebs: Lee, Marković 9 Asts: Lee, Marković 4		Pts: Pavković 20; Rebs: Savović 15; Asts: Pavković 8
Series tied 1–1

Hala Jezero
Kragujevac, Serbia
Referees: Mrdak Branislav, Veskovic Vladimir, Arsenijevic Rados

Game 3

28 May 2011
18:00

Report

Partizan mt:s	98–68	FMP Železnik
Scoring by quarter: 35–10, 15–19, 27–22, 21–17
Pts: Gist 19; Rebs: Gist 11; Asts: Jerrells 6		Pts: Radivojević 17; Rebs: Four players 5 Asts: Three players 3
Partizan won 2–1

Pionir Hall
Belgrade, Serbia
Referees: Juras Marko, Jovcic Milivoje, Stefanovic Ivan

28 May 2011
18:00

Report

Hemofarm STADA	96–66	Radnički Kragujevac
Scoring by quarter: 17–11, 19–16, 30–22, 30–17
Pts: Jeremić 17; Rebs: Maraš 9 Asts: Pavković 9		Pts: Čakarević 18; Rebs: Lee 5 Asts: Marković 7
Hemofarm won 2–1

Millennium Center
Vršac, Serbia
Referees: Neskovic Dragan, Cukalovic Caslav, Mazic Milan

=== Final ===
Game 1

1 June 2011
20:00

Report

Partizan mt:s	85–60	Hemofarm STADA
Scoring by quarter: 22–12, 27–16, 19–18, 17–14
Pts: Three players 13; Rebs: Gist 9 Asts: Jerrells 5		Pts: Pavković 12; Rebs: Savović 13; Asts: Pavković 5
Partizan leads 1–0

Pionir Hall
Belgrade, Serbia
Attendance: 4.500
Referees: Nešković Dragan, Juras Marko, Čukalović Časlav

Game 2

5 June 2011
20:00

Report

Hemofarm STADA	83–89	Partizan mt:s
Scoring by quarter: 22–18, 26–21, 16–29, 19–21
Pts: Božović, Jeremić 16; Rebs: Savović, Jeremić 5 Asts: Pavković, Jeremić 6		Pts: Jerrells 28; Rebs: Jerrells 6 Asts: Kecman 9
Partizan leads 2–0

Millennium Center
Vršac, Serbia
Attendance: 3.000
Referees: Vojinović Milija, Jovčić Milivoje, Mrdak Branislav

Game 3

8 June 2011
20:00

Report

Partizan mt:s	86–69	Hemofarm STADA
Scoring by quarter: 14–14, 23–16, 28–21, 21–18
Pts: Jerrells 24; Rebs: Gist 8 Asts: Kecman 7		Pts: Jeremić 18; Rebs: Božović 10; Asts: Pavković 4
Partizan won 3–0

Pionir Hall
Belgrade, Serbia
Attendance: 8.150
Referees: Belošević Ilija, Obrknežević Uroš, Maričić Saša

=== Bracket ===
Semifinals
1	Partizan mt:s	2
4	FMP Železnik	1
2	Hemofarm STADA	2
3	Radnički Kragujevac	1

Final
1	Partizan mt:s	3
2	Hemofarm STADA	0

2010–11 Basketball League of Serbia Champions

Partizan
18th Title
