= 2012–13 ABA League =

2012–13 ABA League season
- League: ABA League
- Sport: Basketball
- Duration: September 29, 2012 – March 23, 2013 (regular season)
- Games: 185
- Teams: Croatia (4 teams); Serbia (3 teams); Bosnia and Herzegovina (2 teams); Slovenia (2 teams); Hungary (1 team); Macedonia (1 team); Montenegro (1 team)
- TV partner(s): Arena Sport, Šport TV, Sport 1, MKTV, RTS, HRT, RTCG

Regular season
- Season champions: (Bosnia and Herzegovina) Igokea
- Season MVP: (Slovenia) Aleksandar Ćapin (Radnički)
- Top scorer: (Slovenia) Aleksandar Ćapin (Radnički) (17.48 ppg)

Final four
- Champions: (Serbia) Partizan
- Runners-up: (Serbia) Crvena zvezda
- Finals MVP: (Serbia) Raško Katić (Crvena zvezda)

ABA League seasons
- ← 2011–12 2013–14 →

The 2012–13 ABA League was the 12th season of the ABA League, with 14 teams from Serbia, Slovenia, Montenegro, Croatia, Bosnia and Herzegovina, Macedonia and Hungary participating in it. This was the first time a team from Macedonia, MZT Skopje, and a team from Hungary, Szolnoki Olaj were taking part in this regional league, and the fourth time since the league's creation that team that is not from the former Yugoslavia participates in it. It was also for the first time that two best teams ABA League gained automatic access to the next seasons Euroleague competition, while third placed gained wild card to Euroleague qualification round.

Regular season started on September 29, 2012, and lasted until March 23, 2013. 2012–13 ABA League Final Four was held in Laktaši Sports Hall, Laktaši.

== Team information ==
Country	Teams	Team	City	Venue (Capacity)
Croatia	4			
Croatia	4	Cibona	Zagreb	Dražen Petrović Basketball Hall (5,400)
Croatia	4	Cedevita	Zagreb	Sutinska vrela (2,000)
Croatia	4	Split	Split	Arena Gripe (6,000)
Croatia	4	Zadar	Zadar	Krešimir Ćosić Hall (10,000)
Serbia	3			
Serbia	3	Crvena zvezda Telekom	Belgrade	Pionir Hall (8,150)
Serbia	3	Partizan mt:s	Belgrade	Pionir Hall (8,150)
Serbia	3	Radnički	Kragujevac	Hala Jezero (5,320)
Bosnia and Herzegovina	2			
Bosnia and Herzegovina	2	Igokea	Aleksandrovac	Laktaši Sports Hall (3,000)
Bosnia and Herzegovina	2	Široki WWin	Široki Brijeg	Pecara (4,500)
Slovenia	2			
Slovenia	2	Krka	Novo mesto	Leon Štukelj Hall (3,000)
Slovenia	2	Union Olimpija	Ljubljana	Arena Stožice (12,480)
Hungary	1	Szolnoki Olaj	Szolnok	Tiszaligeti Sportcsarnok (3,000)
(North Macedonia) Macedonia	1	MZT Skopje Aerodrom	Skopje	Boris Trajkovski Sports Center (8,000)
Montenegro	1	Budućnost VOLI	Podgorica	Morača Sports Center (5,000)

Location of teams in the ABA League 2012–13 (former Yugoslavia)
Location of teams in the 2012–13 ABA League (Hungary)

== Regular season ==
The regular season began on September 29, 2012, and it will end on March 23, 2013.

=== Standings ===
	Team	Pld	W	L	PF	PA	Diff	Points	%
1	(Bosnia and Herzegovina) Igokea	26	20	6	2013	1857	+156	46	.769
2	(Serbia) Crvena zvezda Telekom	26	18	8	2097	1889	+208	44	.692
3	(Serbia) Radnički	26	17	9	2102	1978	+124	43	.654
4	(Serbia) Partizan mt:s	26	16	10	1905	1832	+73	42	.615
5	(Montenegro) Budućnost VOLI	26	16	10	1864	1774	+90	42	.615
6	(Croatia) Cedevita	26	15	11	1935	1907	+28	41	.577
7	(North Macedonia) MZT Skopje Aerodrom	26	14	12	1933	1931	+2	40	.538
8	(Slovenia) Union Olimpija	26	13	13	1984	1976	+8	39	.500
9	(Slovenia) Krka	26	9	17	1779	1906	–127	35	.346
10	(Bosnia and Herzegovina) Široki WWin	26	9	17	1940	1996	–56	35	.346
11	(Croatia) Cibona	26	9	17	2013	2031	–18	35	.346
12	(Croatia) Zadar	26	9	17	1928	2022	–94	35	.346
13	(Hungary) Szolnoki Olaj	26	9	17	1878	2085	–207	35	.346
14	(Croatia) Split	26	8	18	1808	1995	–187	34	.308

Qualified for Final four
Relegated

Pld – Played; W – Won; L – Lost; PF – Points for; PA – Points against; Diff – Difference; Pts – Points.

As of 24 March 2013

=== Schedule and results ===
	BUD	CDV	CIB	CZV	IGK	KRK	MZT	PAR	RKG	SPL	SZO	ŠRK	UOL	ZDR
(Montenegro) Budućnost VOLI		74–78	60–64	72–63	76–71	74–66	87–71	62–81	80–78	66–47	88–63	65–57	79–75	76–60
(Croatia) Cedevita	84–75		92–78	68–66	78–76	97–78	78–80	76–77	86–68	72–75	91–86	90–69	73–67	67–83
(Croatia) Cibona	60–73	73–64		63–71	78–87	78–86	72–77	80–72	81–85	81–73	97–71	69–63	74–62	90–81
(Serbia) Crvena zvezda Telekom	79–63	90–65	97–95		75–76	79–61	87–72	84–76	87–73	94–67	103–74	69–57	87–76	88–79
(Bosnia and Herzegovina) Igokea	70–61	56–64	94–88	80–77		84–75	79–55	73–50	88–85	79–64	86–84	89-73	87–82	90–75
(Slovenia) Krka	51–66	62–63	69–67	52–57	63–83		68–80	58–66	52–77	79–68	71–56	74–71	79–76	78–62
(North Macedonia) MZT Skopje Aerodrom	69–76	74–61	82–76	60–75	77–81	92–88		66–64	75–83	93–84	87–53	63–59	76–87	94–69
(Serbia) Partizan mt:s	63–50	58–55	74–68	78–92	73–64	79–60	68–58		91–80	68–59	83–69	65–62	71–73	81–74
(Serbia) Radnički	78–63	85–77	105–101	80–75	73–78	84–71	89–83	78–76		72–63	97–72	73–59	65–71	92–79
(Croatia) Split	71–69	74–71	72–62	87–81	60–68	61–71	73–65	72–79	63–81		62–70	88–83	78–70	75–78
(Hungary) Szolnoki Olaj	50–75	64–59	75–71	83–96	78–82	72–69	81–72	70–68	66–78	75–67		69–75	89–72	90–76
(Bosnia and Herzegovina) Široki WWin	70–76	75–77	81–89	78–74	63–69	73–68	71–72	87–80	85–100	101–64	102–101		80–83	80–71
(Slovenia) Union Olimpija	95–92	71–75	87–82	56–70	69–63	76–63	60–64	82–86	81–75	82–73	83–63	82–85		88–81
(Croatia) Zadar	60–72	73–74	78–76	98–81	61–60	65–67	68–76	80–78	75–68	85–68	72–54	76–81	66–78	

== Final four ==
Matches in, Laktaši Sports Hall, Laktaši, Bosnia and Herzegovina on 25 and 27 April 2013.

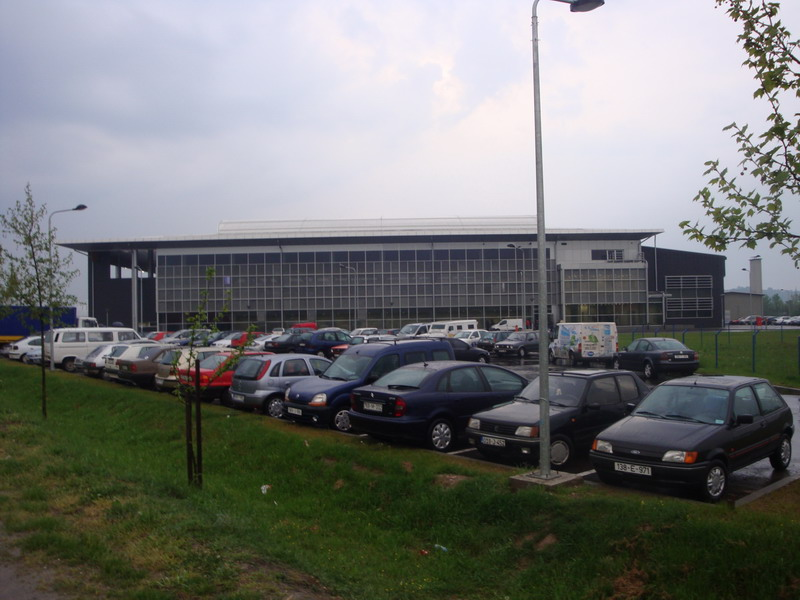
Laktaši Sports Hall

Semifinals
1	(Bosnia and Herzegovina) Igokea	57
4	(Serbia) Partizan mt:s	63
2	(Serbia) Crvena zvezda Telekom	79
3	(Serbia) Radnički Kragujevac	78

Final
(Serbia) Partizan mt:s	71
(Serbia) Crvena zvezda Telekom	63

=== Semifinals ===
25 April 2013
17:00

Report

Crvena zvezda Telekom (Serbia)	79–78	(Serbia) Radnički Kragujevac
Pts: Katić 22; Rebs: Savović 11; Asts: Nelson 6		Pts: Ćapin 25; Rebs: White 7 Asts: Krstović 4

Laktaši Sports Hall, Laktaši
Attendance: 3.000
Referees: Belošević Ilija, Dožai Srdjan, Herceg Siniša

25 April 2013
21:00

Report

Igokea (Bosnia and Herzegovina)	57–63	(Serbia) Partizan mt:s
Pts: Edwards 19; Rebs: Edwards 11; Asts: Joksimović 4		Pts: Lauvergne 12; Rebs: Bertans, Musli 6 Asts: Westermann 4

Laktaši Sports Hall, Laktaši
Attendance: 3.000
Referees: Pukl Sašo, Boltauzer Matej, Javor Damir

=== Final ===
27 April 2013

Report

Partizan mt:s (Serbia)	71–63	(Serbia) Crvena zvezda Telekom
Pts: Westermann 15; Rebs: Lauvergne, Gagić 6 Asts: Westermann 3		Pts: Katić 19; Rebs: Katić 12; Asts: Rakočević, Nelson 3

Laktaši Sports Hall, Laktaši
Attendance: 3.000
Referees: Pukl Sašo, Belošević Ilija, Boltauzer Matej

2012–13 ABA League Champions
(Serbia)
Partizan mt:s
6th title

== Stats leaders ==
As of 1 May 2013

=== Points ===
Rank	Name	Team	Points	Games	PPG
1.	(Slovenia) Aleksandar Ćapin	(Serbia) Radnički	392	22	17.82
2.	(Serbia) Igor Rakočević	(Serbia) Crvena zvezda	417	27	15.44
3.	(Serbia) Marko Šutalo	(Bosnia and Herzegovina) Široki	380	26	14.62
4.	(United States) Romeo Travis	(Croatia) Zadar	365	25	14.60
5.	(United States) Terrico White	(Serbia) Radnički	389	27	14.41

=== Rebounds ===
Rank	Name	Team	Rebounds	Games	RPG
1.	(Serbia) Boris Savović	(Serbia) Crvena zvezda	232	28	8.29
2.	(United States) Romeo Travis	(Croatia) Zadar	195	25	7.80
3.	(United States) Drew Gordon	(Serbia) Partizan	195	26	7.50
4.	(Hungary) Márton Báder	(Hungary) Szolnoki Olaj	177	24	7.38
5.	(Croatia) Željko Šakić	(Bosnia and Herzegovina) Široki	162	26	6.23

=== Assists ===
Rank	Name	Team	Assists	Games	APG
1.	(Slovenia) Aleksandar Ćapin	(Serbia) Radnički	112	22	5.09
2.	(Croatia) Srđan Subotić	(Croatia) Split	125	26	4.81
3.	(Croatia) Jakov Vladović	(Slovenia) Krka	113	26	4.35
4.	(United States) Cliff Hammonds	(Bosnia and Herzegovina) Igokea	106	27	3.93
5.	(Hungary) Simon Balázs	(Hungary) Szolnoki Olaj	94	25	3.76

=== Ranking MVP ===
Rank	Name	Team	Efficiency	Games	Average
1.	(Slovenia) Aleksandar Ćapin	(Serbia) Radnički	460	22	20.91
2.	(United States) Romeo Travis	(Croatia) Zadar	455	25	18.20
3.	(Hungary) Márton Báder	(Hungary) Szolnoki Olaj	417	24	17.38
4.	(Serbia) Boris Savović	(Serbia) Crvena zvezda	476	28	17.00
5.	(North Macedonia) Todor Gečevski	(North Macedonia) MZT Skopje	403	24	16.79

=== MVP Round by Round ===
Round	Player	Team	Efficiency
1	(Croatia) Ivan Mimica	(Croatia) Split	27
2	(Hungary) Márton Báder	(Hungary) Szolnoki Olaj	37
3	(Hungary) Márton Báder (2)	(Hungary) Szolnoki Olaj	58
4	(Serbia) Vladimir Lučić	(Serbia) Partizan	24
5	(Croatia) Darko Planinić	(Bosnia and Herzegovina) Široki	39
6	(Serbia) Vladimir Lučić (2)	(Serbia) Partizan	28
7	(United States) Romeo Travis	(Croatia) Zadar	30
7	(Croatia) Darko Planinić (2)	(Bosnia and Herzegovina) Široki	30
8	(United States) Terrico White	(Serbia) Radnički	49
9	(Serbia) Marko Šutalo	(Bosnia and Herzegovina) Široki	28
10	(Croatia) Darko Planinić (3)	(Bosnia and Herzegovina) Široki	35
11	(Australia) Aron Baynes	(Slovenia) Union Olimpija	35
12	(Slovenia) Jaka Blažič	(Slovenia) Union Olimpija	38
13	(Serbia) Čedomir Vitkovac	(Montenegro) Budućnost	36
14	(Hungary) Márton Báder (3)	(Hungary) Szolnoki Olaj	35
15	(United States) Romeo Travis (2)	(Croatia) Zadar	35
16	(Slovenia) Aleksandar Ćapin	(Serbia) Radnički	29
17	(United States) Romeo Travis (3)	(Croatia) Zadar	34
17	(Slovenia) Aleksandar Ćapin (2)	(Serbia) Radnički	34
18	(Slovenia) Aleksandar Ćapin (3)	(Serbia) Radnički	33
19	(Croatia) Željko Šakić	(Bosnia and Herzegovina) Široki	31
20	(North Macedonia) Todor Gečevski	(North Macedonia) MZT Skopje	37
21	(Slovenia) Aleksandar Ćapin (4)	(Serbia) Radnički	36
22	(United States) Terrico White (2)	(Serbia) Radnički	38
23	(United States) D. J. Strawberry	(Croatia) Cibona	35
24	(Montenegro) Aleksa Popović	(Montenegro) Budućnost	30
24	(Croatia) Andrija Žižić	(Croatia) Cibona	30
25	(Serbia) Branko Jorović	(Bosnia and Herzegovina) Igokea	34
26	(United States) Romeo Travis (4)	(Croatia) Zadar	33
SF	(Slovenia) Aleksandar Ćapin (5)	(Serbia) Radnički	31
F	(Serbia) Raško Katić	(Serbia) Crvena zvezda	33

Source: ABA League

== Top 10 attendances ==
	Round	Game	Home team	Visitor	Attendance	Ref.
1	Regular Season	14	(Croatia) Zadar	(Serbia) Partizan	7,500	
2	Regular Season	15	(Serbia) Crvena zvezda	(Croatia) Zadar	7,000	
2	Regular Season	16	(North Macedonia) MZT Skopje	(Montenegro) Budućnost	7,000	
2	Regular Season	17	(Serbia) Crvena zvezda	(Croatia) Cedevita	7,000	
2	Regular Season	25	(North Macedonia) MZT Skopje	(Serbia) Partizan	7,000	
2	Regular Season	26	(Serbia) Partizan	(Hungary) Szolnoki Olaj	7,000	
7	Regular Season	22	(North Macedonia) MZT Skopje	(Bosnia and Herzegovina) Igokea	6,800	
8	Regular Season	9	(Serbia) Crvena zvezda	(Slovenia) Krka	6,500	
8	Regular Season	24	(Serbia) Partizan	(Bosnia and Herzegovina) Igokea	6,500	
10	Regular Season	11	(Serbia) Crvena zvezda	(Bosnia and Herzegovina) Široki	6,200	
