= Milan Milovanović =

Milan Milovanović may refer to:

- Milan Milovanović (basketball)
- Milan Milovanović (general)
- Milan Milovanović (painter)
