= KK Radnički Kragujevac (2009–2014) =

Defunct basketball club in Kragujevac, Serbia

Radnički Kragujevac
- Nickname: Đavoli (The Devils)
- Founded: 1994; 32 years ago
- Folded: 2014; 12 years ago
- History: KK Kondivik; 1994–2001; KK Lions; 2001–2004; KK Swisslion Takovo; 2004–2009; KK Radnički; 2009–2014
- Arena: Jezero Hall, Kragujevac
- Capacity: 5,320
- Location: Serbia; Vršac (1994–2009); Kragujevac (2009–2014)
- Team colors: Red, White
- Website: kkradnicki.rs
Home	Away

Košarkaški klub Radnički (Serbian Cyrillic: Кошаркашки клуб Раднички), commonly referred to as KK Radnički Kragujevac, was a men's professional basketball club, last based in Kragujevac, Serbia.

The club was founded in Vršac in 1994 and was in 2009 relocated to Kragujevac.

== History ==
=== Early years ===
The club was founded on 4 April 1994 in Vršac as KK Kondivik. It began at the very bottom, competing in the lowest level of basketball pyramid in FR Yugoslavia.

=== Swisslion Takovo ===
In 2001, after gaining promotion to the First Serbian league (third-tier competition in the country), along with securing a sponsorship from the Swisslion Takovo confectionery company, Kondivik changed its name to KK Lions. Under that name the greatest progress in club's history began, achieving promotion in three competition ranks in the period of three years.

In 2004 the club placed first in the league and changed the name again this time to KK Swisslion Takovo. After the same season, after the reorganization of the league loses the first league status which returns already in 2006.

In the 2007–08 and 2008–09 seasons, the club won the top spot in the basketball league of Serbia in superior fashion, thus gaining a spot in the Superliga as well as the national cup (Kup Radivoja Koraća) finals.

=== Radnički Kragujevac ===
After winning the qualification playoff series over KK Vojvodina 3–0, the club got a spot in the Adriatic League. KK Swisslion Takovo was supposed to move from Vršac to Gornji Milanovac. However, the club's longtime sponsor, Swisslion Takovo company withdrew their investment in the club before the start of the debut season in the Adriatic League. According to the word of that time president of the ABA league, Gornji Milanovac does not meet the requirements in the field of hotel accommodation (because the main hotel bankrupted) and changed ABA League basketball rules about basketball terrain. Hand of rescue to the team was provided by the City of Kragujevac, specifically the city's mayor Veroljub Stevanović and his associates. The club relocated to Kragujevac on October 21, 2009, was given the name of the famous club that already existed in the city – KK Radnički.

During the debut 2009–10 season, Radnički was the "biggest surprise" in regional and national competitions. In the Adriatic League, the club had seized the 11th position with 11 wins and 15 defeats.

For the 2010–11 season, Radnički was considered the favorite in almost every game in Kragujevac. The results were better than the previous year so and the club won the 10th place.

=== Names of the club through history ===
Year	Name	Location
1994–2001	KK Kondivik	Vršac
2001–2004	KK Lions	Vršac
2004–2009	KK Swisslion Takovo	Vršac
2009–2014	KK Radnički	Kragujevac

== Home arena ==
Hala Jezero (Serbian Cyrillic: Хала Језеро, English: The Jezero Hall) is a multi-purpose indoor arena located in the city of Kragujevac. It was the home ground of basketball club Radnički and has a capacity of 5,320 seats.

== Supporters ==
Crveni Djavoli (Serbian Cyrillic: Црвени Ђаволи, English: The Red Devils) or Djavoli are the organized supporters of the Kragujevac based football club Radnički Kragujevac. Besides football club, they also support other sport sections of the Radnički Kragujevac Sport Association.

== Coaches ==
Lions/Swisslion Vršac (2001–2009)

- (Serbia and Montenegro) Zoran Todorović (2001–2003)
- (Serbia and Montenegro) Miroslav Popov (2003–2004)
- (Serbia and Montenegro) Milovan Stepandić (2004)
- (Serbia and Montenegro) Miodrag Baletić (2004–2005)
- (Serbia and Montenegro) Aleksandar Bućan (2005)
- (Serbia and Montenegro) Srećko Sekulović (2005–2006)
- (Serbia) Boško Đokić (2006–2007)
- (Serbia) Dejan Mijatović (2007–2009)

Radnički Kragujevac (2009–2014)

- (Serbia) Miroslav Nikolić (2009–2014)

== Season-by-season ==
Season	Tier	Division	Pos.	Postseason	W–L	National Cup	Regional competitions			European competitions		
Lions
2001–02	3	BLSM Serbian League		—		—	—			—		
2002–03	3	BLSM Serbian League		—		—	—			—		
2003–04	2	BLSM B League	3	—	18–5	—	—			—		
Swisslion Takovo
2004–05	1	BLSM First League	10	—	13–13	—	—			—		
2005–06	2	BLSM B League	1	—	22–4	—	—			—		
2006–07	1	BLS First League	9	—	8–14	—	—			—		
2007–08	1	BLS First League	1	SL 6th	19–15	Quarterfinals	—			—		
2008–09	1	BLS First League	1	SL 5th	26–9	Quarterfinals	Balkan League	QF	8–2	—		
Radnički Kragujevac
2009–10	1	BLS Super League	3	Semifinalist	9–7	Semifinalist	ABA League	11	11–15	—		
2010–11	1	BLS Super League	3	Semifinalist	9–8	Semifinalist	ABA League	10	12–14	—		
2011–12	1	BLS Super League	2	Semifinalist	11–6	Semifinalist	ABA League	8	12–14	—		
2012–13	1	BLS Super League	5	—	7–7	Semifinalist	ABA League	SF	17–10	—		
2013–14	1	BLS Super League	4	Semifinalist	8–8	Semifinalist	ABA League	11	10–16	2 Eurocup	N4	7–9

== Trophies and awards ==
=== Trophies ===
- First B League of Serbia and Montenegro (2nd-tier)
  - Winners (1) – 2005–06

=== Awards ===
- ABA League MVP
  - (United States) David Simon – 2011–12
  - (Slovenia) Aleksandar Ćapin – 2012–13
- ABA League Top Scorer
  - (United States) Michael Lee – 2010–11
  - (United States) David Simon – 2011–12
  - (Slovenia) Aleksandar Ćapin – 2012–13

== Notable players ==
- (Serbia) Boban Marjanović
- (Serbia) Dragan Milosavljević
- (Serbia) Nenad Miljenović
- (Serbia) Miljan Pavković
- (Serbia) Nikola Kalinić
- (Serbia) Marko Marinović
- (Serbia) Danilo Mijatović
- (Serbia) Stefan Sinovec
- (Serbia) Stefan Birčević
- (Serbia) Stefan Jović
- (Serbia) Bojan Krstović
- (Serbia) Sava Lešić
- (Serbia) Marko Brkić
- (Serbia) Miloš Dimić
- (Serbia) Nikola Jevtović
- (Serbia) Uroš Nikolić
- (Serbia) Nenad Šulović
- (Serbia) Uroš Lučić
- (Serbia) Ratko Varda
- (Serbia) Dušan Katnić
- (Serbia) Predrag Miletić
- (Serbia) Miloš Janković
- (Serbia) Mladen Pantić
- (Serbia) Vladimir Vuksanović
- (Serbia) Strahinja Stojačić
- (Serbia) Vladan Vukosavljević
- (Serbia) Filip Šepa
- (Serbia) Saša Bratić
- (Serbia) Vukašin Aleksić
- (Serbia) Duško Bunić
- (Serbia) Marko Čakarević
- (Serbia) Vladislav Dragojlović
- (Serbia) Nenad Mišanović
- (Serbia) Miljan Rakić
- (Serbia) Radenko Pilčević
- (Serbia) Dušan Knežević
- (Slovenia) Aleksandar Ćapin
- (Bosnia and Herzegovina) Aleksej Nešović
- (Australia) Steven Marković
- (Australia) Mark Worthington
- (United Kingdom) Matthew Bryan-Amaning
- (Turkey) Yunus Çankaya
- (Montenegro) Miloš Borisov
- (Montenegro) Boris Bakić
- (Russia) Aleksei Kotishevskiy
- (Sweden) Anton Gaddefors
- (Benin) Mouphtaou Yarou
- (Switzerland) Dušan Mlađan
- (United States) Terrico White
- (United States) Michael Lee
- (United States) Michael Scott
- (United States) D. J. Seeley
- (United States) Kyle Visser
- (United States) David Simon

== International record ==
Season	Achievement	Notes
EuroCup
2013–14	Last 32 phase	3rd in Group N with Alba Berlin, Khimik Yuzhny, Strasbourg IG (2–4)
