= Danilo Mijatović =

Serbian basketball player

KK Velika Kikinda
- Position: Power forward
- League: Second League of Serbia

Personal information
- Born: August 6, 1983 (age 43) Titov Vrbas, SFR Yugoslavia
- Listed height: 2.05 m (6 ft 9 in)
- Listed weight: 106 kg (234 lb)

Career information
- NBA draft: 2005: undrafted
- Playing career: 1997–present

Career history
- 1997–2003: Vrbas
- 2003–2005: Novi Sad
- 2005–2006: Spartak Subotica
- 2006–2013: Swisslion / Radnički Kragujevac
- 2013–2014: Anwil Włocławek
- 2014–2015: Timba Timișoara
- 2015–2016: MZT Skopje
- 2016–2017: Kumanovo
- 2017: MZT Skopje
- 2017–2019: Blokotehna
- 2019: AV Ohrid
- 2019–2020: Rabotnički
- 2020–2021: EuroNickel 2005
- 2021–2023: Star
- 2023–2024: Proleter
- 2024-present: Velika Kikinda

Career highlights
- Balkan League champion (2019); 3× Macedonian League champion (2015–2017); Macedonian Cup winner (2016)
Medals
Men's 3x3 basketball
Representing Serbia
European Championships
Gold medal – first place	2019 Hungary	Team

Danilo Mijatović (born August 6, 1983) is a Serbian professional basketball player for Proleter of the Second League of Serbia.
