= Elton Brown (basketball) =

American basketball player (born 1983)

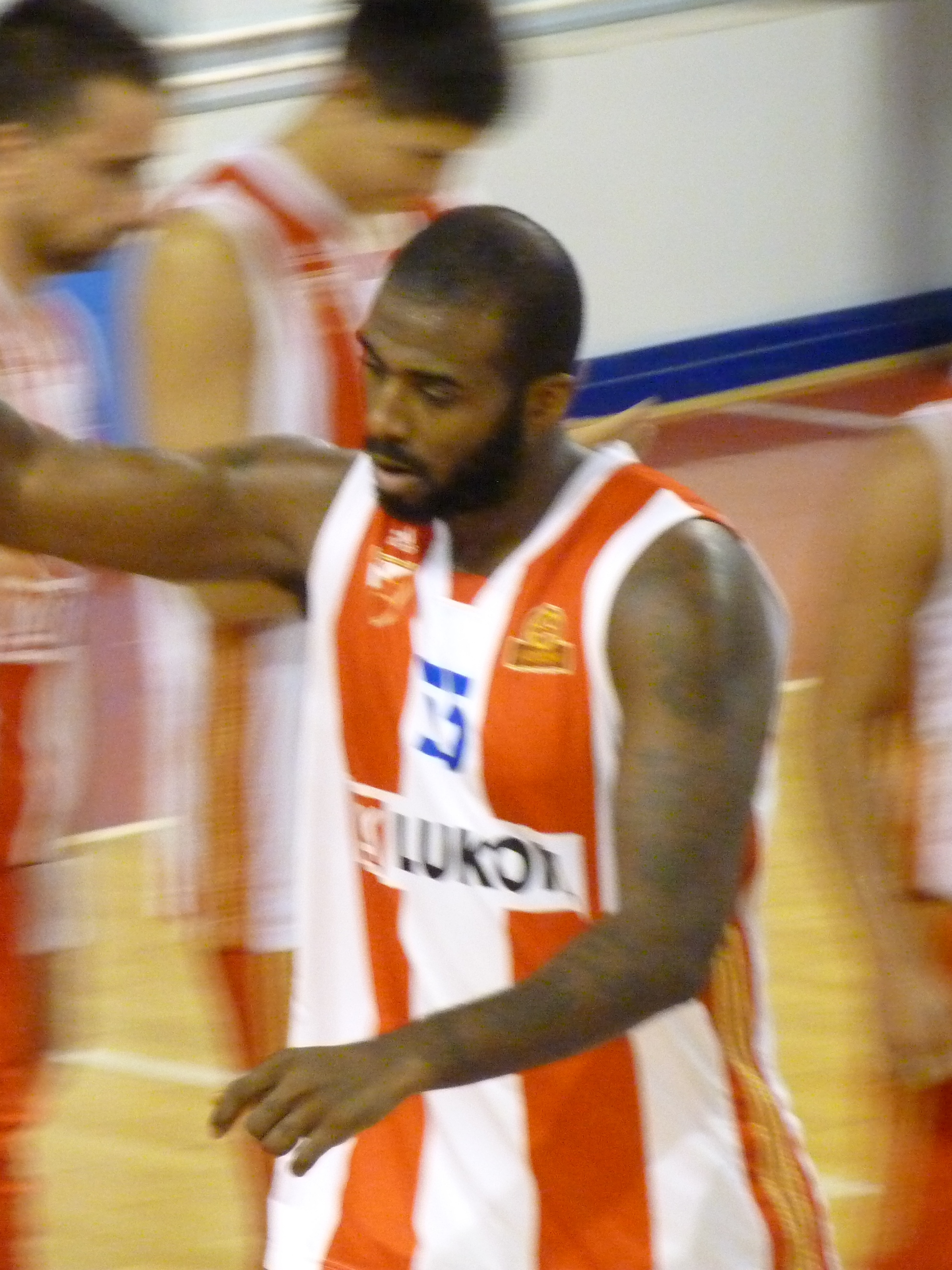
- Brown with Crvena zvezda in 2012

Personal information
- Born: September 15, 1983 (age 43) Newport News, Virginia, U.S.
- Listed height: 6 ft 9 in (2.06 m)
- Listed weight: 250 lb (113 kg)

Career information
- High school: Warwick (Newport News, Virginia)
- College: Virginia (2001–2005)
- NBA draft: 2005: undrafted
- Playing career: 2005–2017
- Position: Center

Career history
- 2005–2006: Makedonikos
- 2006: Florida Flame
- 2006: Menorca Bàsquet
- 2006–2007: Colorado 14ers
- 2007: Capitanes de Arecibo
- 2007–2008: Colorado 14ers
- 2008: Hapoel Holon
- 2008–2009: Maccabi Tel Aviv
- 2009–2010: Brose Baskets
- 2010–2011: Barak Netanya
- 2011–2012: Trabzonspor
- 2012–2013: Crvena zvezda
- 2013–2014: Paris-Levallois
- 2015: BCM Gravelines
- 2015: Indios de Mayagüez
- 2015–2016: STB Le Havre
- 2017: SLUC Nancy Basket

Career highlights
- German Bundesliga champion (2010); Israeli League champion (2008); TBL All-Star (2012); TBL Top Rebounder (2012); All-NBA D-League First Team (2007); 2× NBA D-League All-Star (2007, 2008)

Elton Brown (born September 15, 1983) is an American former professional basketball player who last played for SLUC Nancy Basket of the LNB Pro A. He is a 6-foot-9-inch (2.06 m) center from Newport News, Virginia.

== College career ==
Brown played college basketball at the University of Virginia. Majoring in Anthropology he ranked 20th in all-time scoring, and Top 10 in rebounding. He was a 3-year starter and first team All-Rookie. During his junior and senior years, he was awarded the All-ACC Honorable Mention with an average of 14.8 points and 8 rebounds as a junior and 12 points and 8 rebounds as a senior.

== Professional career ==
Brown began his pro career in the Greek League with Makedonikos Kozani in the 2005–06 season, where he led the Greek League in rebounding and was the only player in the league to average a double-double for the season. He then spent the 2006–07 season playing in the NBA Development League with the Colorado 14ers. Brown participated in the 2nd annual NBA Development League All-Star Game, leading the Red Team with 20 points and 10 rebounds in a losing effort. Brown Also led the NBA Development League in rebounding with 12.7 and second in scoring with an 18.4 average per game while being the first overall pick in the NBA Development Draft for the Colorado 14ers.

Brown participated in the Los Angeles Lakers' training camp prior to the 2007–08 NBA season. He also played on the Denver Nuggets' Summer League team that participated in the 2008 Las Vegas Summer League, where he averaged 13.3 points per game and 10 rebounds per game over 5 games.

During the season of 2007–08 he joined Hapoel Holon from Israel, with whom he won the Israeli League Championship.

On December 2, 2008, Brown signed with the Euroleague team of Maccabi Tel Aviv.

On February 6, 2009, Brown signed with the German BBL team Brose Baskets Bamberg. He played a big role in the remaining season of Bamberg, but could not avoid his team's loss in the semifinal series against Oldenburg. In August 2009, he re-signed with Bamberg for one more season. In his second season with the club, he won the German Bundesliga and German Cup.

For the 2010–11 season he signed with Barak Netanya of Israel. Brown was selected All Euro-challenge Third team while playing with Netanya.

Season 2011–12 he spent in Turkey with Trabzonspor. In 23 games of the Turkish Basketball League he averaged 18 points and 12 rebounds per game. Brown was selected to the TBL All-Star game.

In July 2012 he signed a one-year contract with the Serbian team where he won the Serbian cup championship Crvena zvezda.

In October 2013, he signed with Paris-Levallois Basket of the LNB Pro A for the 2013–14 season. Brown won sixth man of the year in the LNB

On January 4, 2015, he signed with BCM Gravelines of the LNB Pro A. On February 2, 2015, he parted ways with Gravelines. On March 10, he signed with Indios de Mayagüez of Puerto Rico. Brown was the only player to average a double-double with a 13.3 points and 11.8 rebounds per game.

On November 19, 2015, he signed with the French club STB Le Havre for the rest of the 2015–16 season.

On January 12, 2017, he signed with French club SLUC Nancy Basket for the rest of the 2016–17 Pro A season.
