= Michael Lee (basketball, born 1986) =

American basketball player (born 1986)

Personal information
- Born: June 5, 1986 (age 40) Tallahassee, Florida
- Listed height: 6 ft 9 in (2.06 m)
- Listed weight: 215 lb (98 kg)

Career information
- High school: Cardinal Newman (West Palm Beach, Florida)
- College: St. Bonaventure (2004–2008)
- NBA draft: 2008: undrafted
- Playing career: 2008–2016
- Position: Power forward

Career history
- 2008: Cholet
- 2009: Split
- 2009–2010: Albacomp
- 2010–2011: Radnički Kragujevac
- 2011–2012: Donetsk
- 2012–2013: Politekhnika-Halychyna
- 2013–2014: Canton Charge
- 2014: Delaware 87ers
- 2014: SOMB Boulogne-sur-Mer
- 2015: Szolnoki Olaj
- 2016: BCM U Pitești

Career highlights
- Adriatic League Top Scorer (2011); Ukrainian League champion (2012); Hungarian League champion (2015); Hungarian Cup winner (2015)

Michael Rahjoan Lee (born June 5, 1986) is an American former professional basketball player. His primary position is power forward.

== Early career ==
Lee attended Cardinal Newman High School in West Palm Beach. He played college basketball at St. Bonaventure University. In his four-year career with the Bonnies, Lee averaged 12.5 points and 6.0 rebounds per game, posting career best averages of 17.5 points and 8.0 rebounds during the 2007–08 season, his senior year.

== Professional career ==
After going undrafted in the 2008 NBA draft, Lee signed with Cholet Basket of France. However, he played only two games for the team due to injury, and was released before the end of the year. In January 2009, Lee joined KK Split of Croatia.

In 2009, Lee signed with Albacomp of Hungary for the 2009–10 season.

In October 2010, Lee signed with Radnički Kragujevac of Serbia for the 2010–11 season. He averaged 19.6 points per game in the Adriatic League, and 14.0 points per game in the Basketball League of Serbia.

In July 2011, he signed with BC Donetsk of Ukraine for the 2011–12 season.

He joined the Sacramento Kings for the 2012 NBA Summer League. He started three of five games, averaging 5.8 points and 2.0 rebounds for 16.4 minutes a contest. In September 2012, Lee returned to Ukraine and signed with Politekhnika-Halychyna for the 2012–13 season.

On September 30, 2013, he signed with the Cleveland Cavaliers. However, he was later waived on October 19.

In November 2013, he was acquired by the Canton Charge. On January 27, 2014, he was traded to the Delaware 87ers.

On October 4, 2014, he signed with SOMB Boulogne-sur-Mer of the LNB Pro A. On January 8, 2015, he signed with Szolnoki Olaj of Hungary for the rest of the season.

On January 18, 2016, Lee signed with BCM U Pitești of the Romanian League.
