= Radovan Marković =

Serbian basketball player

CSM Oradea
- Title: Assistant coach
- League: Liga Națională; FIBA Europe Cup

Personal information
- Born: March 11, 1982 (age 44) Belgrade, SFR Yugoslavia
- Listed height: 6 ft 5 in (1.96 m)

Career information
- NBA draft: 2004: undrafted
- Playing career: 2000–2019
- Position: Shooting guard

Career history

Playing
- 2000–2004: Lavovi 063
- 2004–2005: Telekom Bonn
- 2005–2009: Swisslion Takovo
- 2009–2010: Tamiš Petrohemija
- 2010–2011: Walter Tigers Tübingen
- 2011–2013: Vojvodina Srbijagas
- 2013–2016: CSM Oradea
- 2017: Mureș

Coaching
- 2019–present: CSM Oradea (assistant)

Radovan Marković (born March 11, 1982) is a Serbian professional basketball coach and former player who played at the shooting guard position. He is currently working as assistant coach for CSM Oradea of the Liga Națională.
