= Vuk Radivojević =

Serbian basketball player

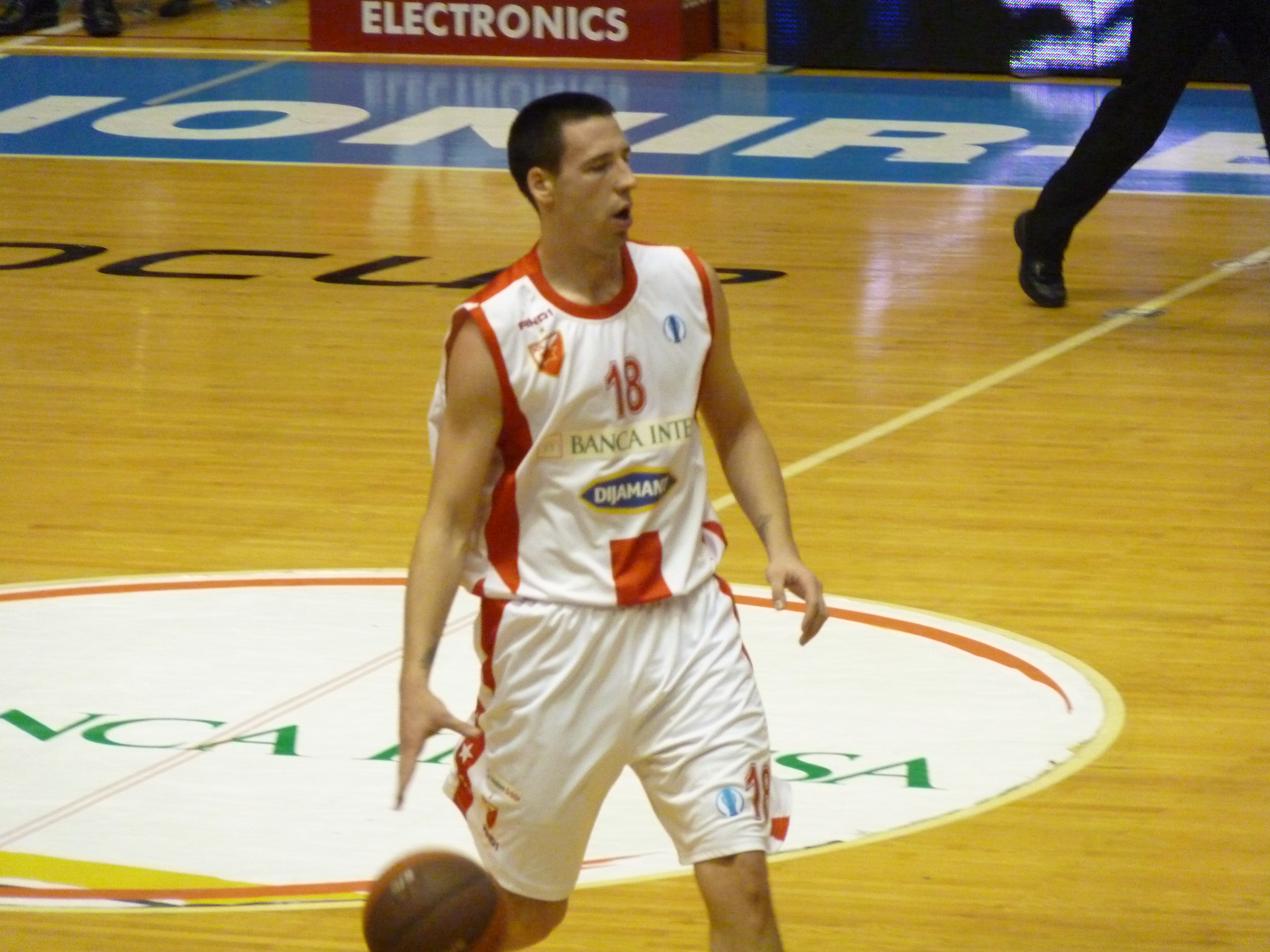
- Radivojević with Crvena zvezda in February 2010.

Igokea m:tel
- Title: Sports director
- League: Bosnian League; ABA League

Personal information
- Born: July 30, 1983 (age 43) Belgrade, SR Serbia, SFR Yugoslavia
- Listed height: 6 ft 5 in (1.96 m)
- Listed weight: 198 lb (90 kg)

Career information
- NBA draft: 2005: undrafted
- Playing career: 2002–2019
- Position: Point guard / shooting guard

Career history
- 2002–2003: Sloga
- 2003–2007: Crvena zvezda
- 2007–2009: Fuenlabrada
- 2009–2010: Crvena zvezda
- 2010–2011: FMP
- 2011–2013: Crvena zvezda
- 2013–2014: Türk Telekom
- 2014–2015: Śląsk Wrocław
- 2015–2019: Igokea

Career highlights
- 2× Bosnian League champion (2016, 2017); 3× Serbian Cup winner (2004, 2006, 2013); 4× Bosnian Cup winner (2016–2019)

Vuk Radivojević (Serbian Cyrillic: Вук Радивојевић, born July 30, 1983) is a retired Serbian professional basketball player. He represented the Serbian national basketball team internationally. He is currently the sports director for Igokea m:tel of the Bosnian League and the ABA League.

== Professional career ==
Radivojević had his first senior basketball experience with KK Sloga in 2002, after which he spent four years playing for Crvena zvezda, eventually becoming its captain. After two seasons spent in Spanish Fuenlabrada, then a member of the ACB League, he returned to Belgrade and played a season for Red Star and then another for FMP. In November 2013, he signed with Türk Telekom. On December 29, 2014, he signed with Śląsk Wrocław for the rest of the season.

On September 30, 2015, Radivojević signed a contract with the Bosnian team Igokea. He debuted for the team in 67–56 loss to Cedevita Zagreb in Round 1 of the ABA League; he scored 8 points on 3 from 14 shooting from the field.

In June 2019, Radivojević announced his retirement from playing career.

== National team career ==
He was a member of the Serbian national basketball team at EuroBasket 2007.

== See also ==
- List of Serbia men's national basketball team players
- KK Crvena zvezda accomplishments and records
