= Terrico White =

American basketball player

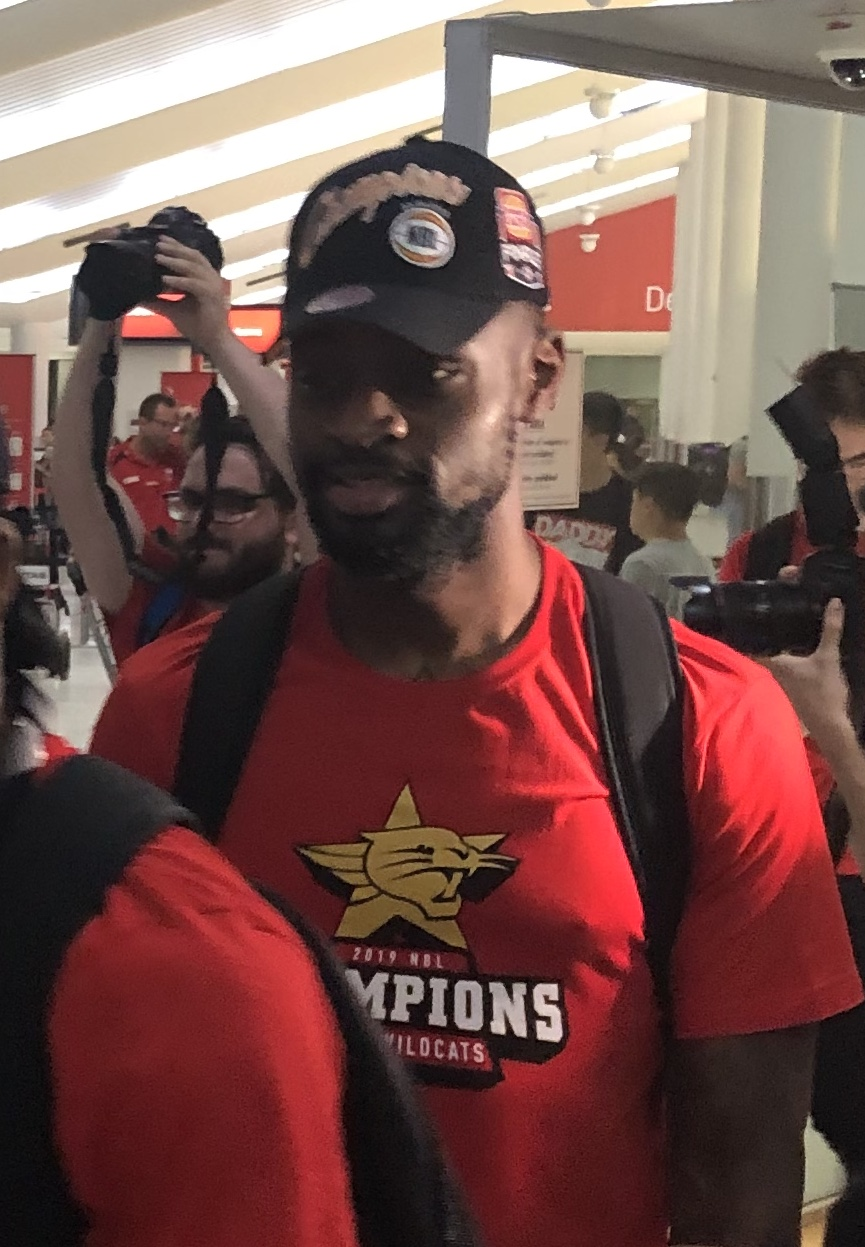
- White with the Perth Wildcats in 2019

Personal information
- Born: March 7, 1990 (age 36) Memphis, Tennessee, U.S.
- Listed height: 6 ft 5 in (196 cm)
- Listed weight: 214 lb (97 kg)

Career information
- High school: Craigmont (Memphis, Tennessee)
- College: Ole Miss (2008–2010)
- NBA draft: 2010: 2nd round, 36th overall pick
- Drafted by: Detroit Pistons
- Playing career: 2011–present
- Position: Shooting guard

Career history
- 2011–2012: Idaho Stampede
- 2012–2013: Radnički Kragujevac
- 2013–2014: Royal Halı Gaziantep
- 2014: Hapoel Eilat
- 2014–2015: Yenisey Krasnoyarsk
- 2015–2016: Bakersfield Jam
- 2016: Ironi Nes Ziona
- 2016–2018: Seoul SK Knights
- 2018–2020: Perth Wildcats
- 2019: Manama
- 2020: Cariduros de Fajardo
- 2021: Changwon LG Sakers
- 2021: Seoul Samsung Thunders
- 2021: Gigantes de Carolina
- 2021: Brujos de Guayama
- 2022: Long Island Nets
- 2022: Brujos de Guayama
- 2022–2023: Hsinchu JKO Lioneers
- 2023: Al-Najma
- 2023: Metros de Santiago
- 2023: Correbasket UAT
- 2025: Kalamunda Eastern Suns

Career highlights
- 2× NBL champion (2019, 2020); NBL Grand Final MVP (2019); KBL champion (2018); KBL Finals MVP (2018); Second-team All-SEC (2009); SEC Rookie of the Year (2009); SEC All-Freshman Team (2009); Class AAA Tennessee Mr. Basketball (2008)
- Stats at NBA.com
- Stats at Basketball Reference
Medals
Men's basketball
Representing United States
U-19 World Championship
Gold medal – first place	2009 New Zealand	Team

Terrico Reshard White (born March 7, 1990) is an American professional basketball player who last played for the Kalamunda Eastern Suns of the NBL1 West. A native of Memphis, Tennessee, he was drafted by the Detroit Pistons with the 36th overall pick in the second round of the 2010 NBA draft after playing two collegiate seasons at Ole Miss, where he earned SEC Rookie of the Year in 2009.

Since 2012, White has played in Serbia, Turkey, Israel, Russia, Korea, Australia, Bahrain, Puerto Rico, Taiwan, the Dominican Republic, and Mexico. Between 2018 and 2020, he won a three-peat of championships, the first in Korea with Seoul SK Knights and the next two in Australia with the Perth Wildcats. He was named KBL Finals MVP in 2018 and NBL Grand Final MVP in 2019.

== High school career ==
White attended Craigmont High School in Memphis, Tennessee. As a junior in 2006–07, he averaged 22 points, seven rebounds, three assists and three steals per game. He was named All-Metro, First Team All-State by the Tennessee Writers Association, and was one of the five finalist for The Commercial Appeal's Player of the Year.

In November 2007, White committed to Ole Miss.

As a senior in 2007–08, White was named Tennessee's Class AAA Mr. Basketball. He averaged 27.1 points per game, leading his team in points, field goal percentage, three-pointers, free-throw percentage, and steals. He was also named the District 14-AAA regular season and tournament MVP, and earned Region All-tournament team honors.

== College career ==
White played collegiately for Ole Miss and scored 955 career points and averaged 14.5 points and 4.0 rebounds per game over his two years with the Rebels. He was named SEC Rookie of the Year after taking over point guard duties for the injured Chris Warren in league play and posted 18.4 points per SEC game. He then spent the summer of 2009 with Team USA, helping the Americans to a gold medal at the FIBA U19 World Championships in New Zealand. As a sophomore in 2009–10, he averaged 15.1 points and 4.6 rebounds per contest in helping the Rebels to a 24–11 record, SEC West title and NIT Final Four appearance.

In April 2010, White declared for the NBA draft. He did not hire an agent however, thus leaving the opportunity to return to the Rebels if he withdrew by May 8. On May 6, White decided to hire an agent and remain in the draft.

Year	Team	GP	GS	MPG	FG%	3P%	FT%	RPG	APG	SPG	BPG	PPG
2008–09	Mississippi	31	21	30.0	.428	.354	.628	3.4	2.3	.8	.3	13.7
2009–10	Mississippi	35	34	31.5	.430	.341	.714	4.6	1.5	.9	.2	15.1
Career		66	55	30.8	.429	.347	.680	4.0	1.9	.8	.2	14.5

== Professional career ==
=== NBA and D-League (2010–2012) ===
White was selected by the Detroit Pistons with the 36th overall pick in the 2010 NBA draft. He went on to average 9.6 points in five games for the Pistons during the 2010 NBA Summer League in Las Vegas. He boasted the best vertical jump (40 inches) of any player during the pre-draft combine, and during the NBA rookie orientation, he became known around the league for his gifted dunking abilities with a YouTube video of a spur-of-the-moment rookie slam dunk contest. However, during the Pistons' first preseason game, White broke the fifth metatarsal in his right foot and subsequently missed the entire 2010–11 season.

In December 2011, White was cut by the Pistons following the conclusion of the NBA lockout, despite declaring himself 100 percent fit. He subsequently spent preseason with the New Orleans Hornets, but got released again due to back issues. He then joined the Idaho Stampede of the NBA Development League, where he managed 18 games before a stress fracture in his back forced him to sit out the rest of the 2011–12 season. In July 2012, he played for the Los Angeles Clippers Summer League team in Las Vegas.

=== Serbia (2012–2013) ===
For the 2012–13 season, White moved to Serbia to play for Radnički Kragujevac. After shooting poorly to start the season, he had a season-high 36 points on November 10 against Cibona. In 27 games during the Adriatic League season, he averaged 14.4 points per game. He also averaged 14.8 points in 12 Serbian Super League games.

=== Turkey and Israel (2013–2014) ===
After playing for the Dallas Mavericks during the 2013 NBA Summer League in Las Vegas, White moved to Turkey for the 2013–14 season to play for Royal Halı Gaziantep. On February 19, 2014, he left Gaziantep and moved to Israel to finish the season with Hapoel Eilat.

=== Russia (2014–2015) ===
After playing for the Memphis Grizzlies during the 2014 NBA Summer League in Orlando, White moved to Russia for the 2014–15 season to play for Enisey Krasnoyarsk.

=== NBA D-League and Israel (2015–2016) ===
After spending training camp and preseason with the Phoenix Suns in October 2015, White joined the Bakersfield Jam of the NBA Development League for the 2015–16 season. In March 2016, he returned to Israel to finish the season with Ironi Nes Ziona.

=== South Korea (2016–2018) ===
For the 2016–17 season, White moved to South Korea to play for the Seoul SK Knights. He returned to the Knights for the 2017–18 season, and in April 2018, he helped the team win the KBL championship. He was subsequently named Finals MVP after averaging 25 points, 5.3 rebounds and 7.5 assists per game during the six-game championship series. He became the first foreign player in 15 years to win the award.

=== Australia and Bahrain (2018–2020) ===
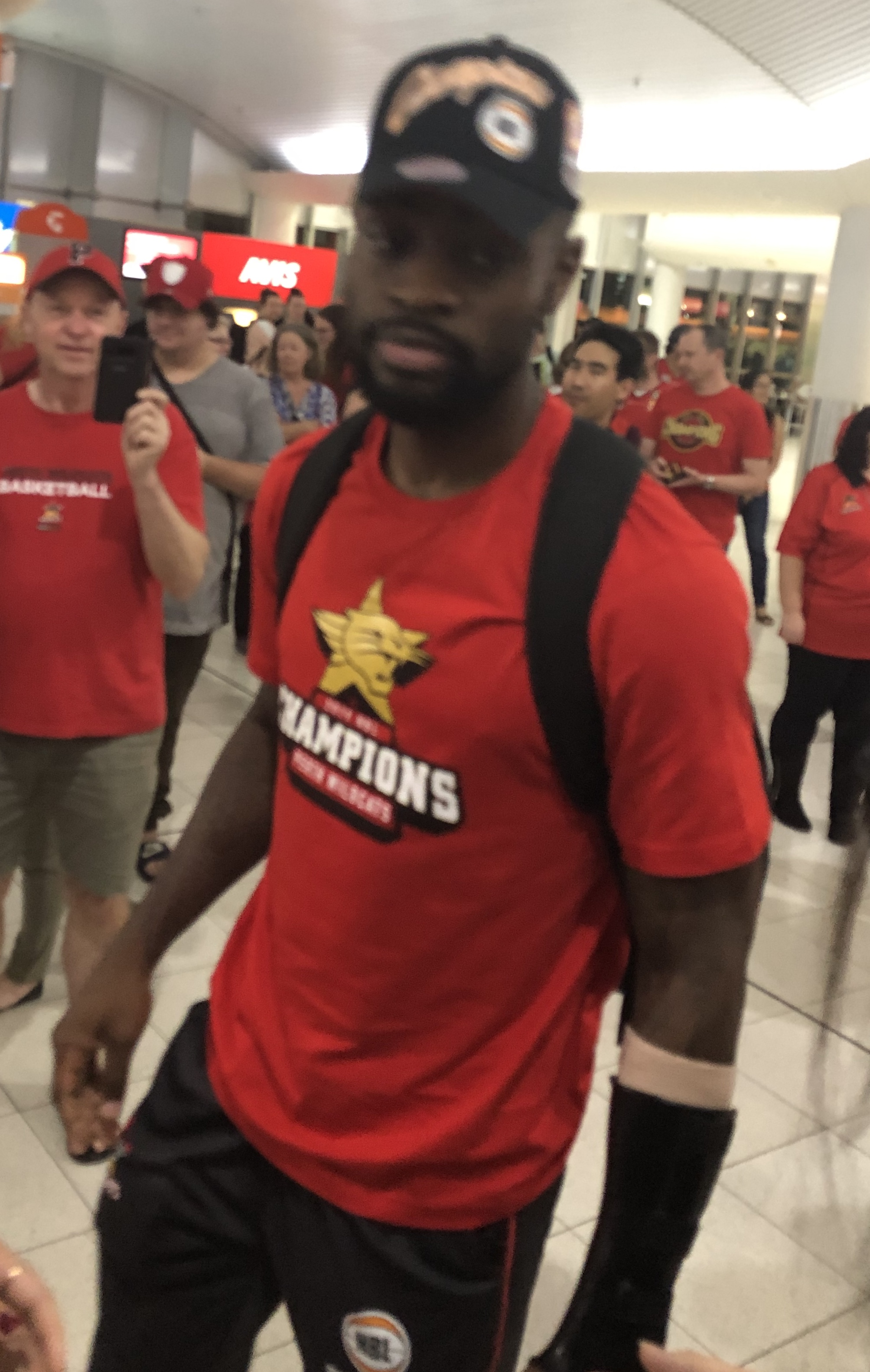
White in March 2019, wearing a cast on his left arm after winning the championship with the Wildcats

On July 27, 2018, White signed with the Perth Wildcats for the 2018–19 NBL season. He promised head coach Trevor Gleeson to bring a championship to Perth. He endured knee and hamstring injuries throughout the campaign, but battled through the regular season to only miss a handful of games. A wrist injury required him to wear a cast on his left arm at the end of the regular season and during the finals. White received criticism throughout the season for not seizing control of games, but stepped up in the playoffs with 19 and 24 point games during the semifinal wins over the Brisbane Bullets, and scored 19, 17, 31 and 20 points in the four grand final matches, helping the Wildcats defeat Melbourne United 3–1 behind another championship series MVP.

In April 2019, White played for Bahraini club Manama Club during the FIBA Asia Champions Cup 2019 Gulf Basketball Association (GBA) Qualifiers. During the tournament's preliminary round, White had a triple-double with 18 points, 10 rebounds and 10 assists. He helped Manama reach the final with a 30-point effort in the semi-final, before scoring 21 points in an 82–74 loss to Sharjah in the final.

On July 3, 2019, White re-signed with the Wildcats for the 2019–20 NBL season. Statistically he put up almost identical numbers to 2018–19 with 15 points per game, but saw a dip in form at the end of the season and suffered multiple injuries. In March 2020, he was crowned an NBL champion for the second year in a row.

=== Puerto Rico (2020) ===
On October 14, 2020, White signed with Cariduros de Fajardo of the Baloncesto Superior Nacional (BSN). In his debut game, he made 10 3-pointers and scored 38 points. The team lost in the quarter-finals two months later.

=== Second Korean stint (2021) ===
On January 9, 2021, White signed with Changwon LG Sakers as an injury replacement for Cady Lalanne, returning to the Korean Basketball League for a second stint. On February 4, 2021, he was traded to Seoul Samsung Thunders.

=== Second Puerto Rican stint (2021) ===
In June 2021, White signed with Gigantes de Carolina, returning to the BSN for a second stint. After playing seven games with the team, he signed with Brujos de Guayama.

=== NBA G League (2021–2022) ===
On December 28, 2021, White was acquired by the Long Island Nets of the NBA G League. He was waived two days later. He was re-acquired by Long Island on January 21, 2022, and then waived again on February 1 after appearing in two games.

=== Return to Puerto Rico (2022) ===
On March 15, 2022, White returned to Brujos de Guayama.

=== Taiwan (2022–2023) ===
In October 2022, White signed with Hsinchu JKO Lioneers of the Taiwanese P. League+. In 18 games, he averaged 20.4 points, 7.0 rebounds and 3.7 assists per game.

=== Return to Bahrain (2023) ===
In March 2023, White joined Al-Najma of the Bahraini Premier League.

=== Dominican Republic (2023) ===
In May 2023, White had a four-game stint in the Dominican Republic with Metros de Santiago.

=== Mexico (2023) ===
In October 2023, White had a five-game stint with Correbasket UAT of the Mexican LNBP.

=== Return to Australia (2025) ===
In September 2024, White signed with the Kalamunda Eastern Suns of the NBL1 West for the 2025 season. His former Perth Wildcats teammate, Bryce Cotton, helped him connect with Kalamunda. White formed a backcourt duo with Marshall Nelson. In 21 games, he averaged 11.57 points, 4.76 rebounds and 2.33 assists per game.

== Personal ==
White has a daughter.
