= DeMarcus Nelson =

American basketball player (born 1985)

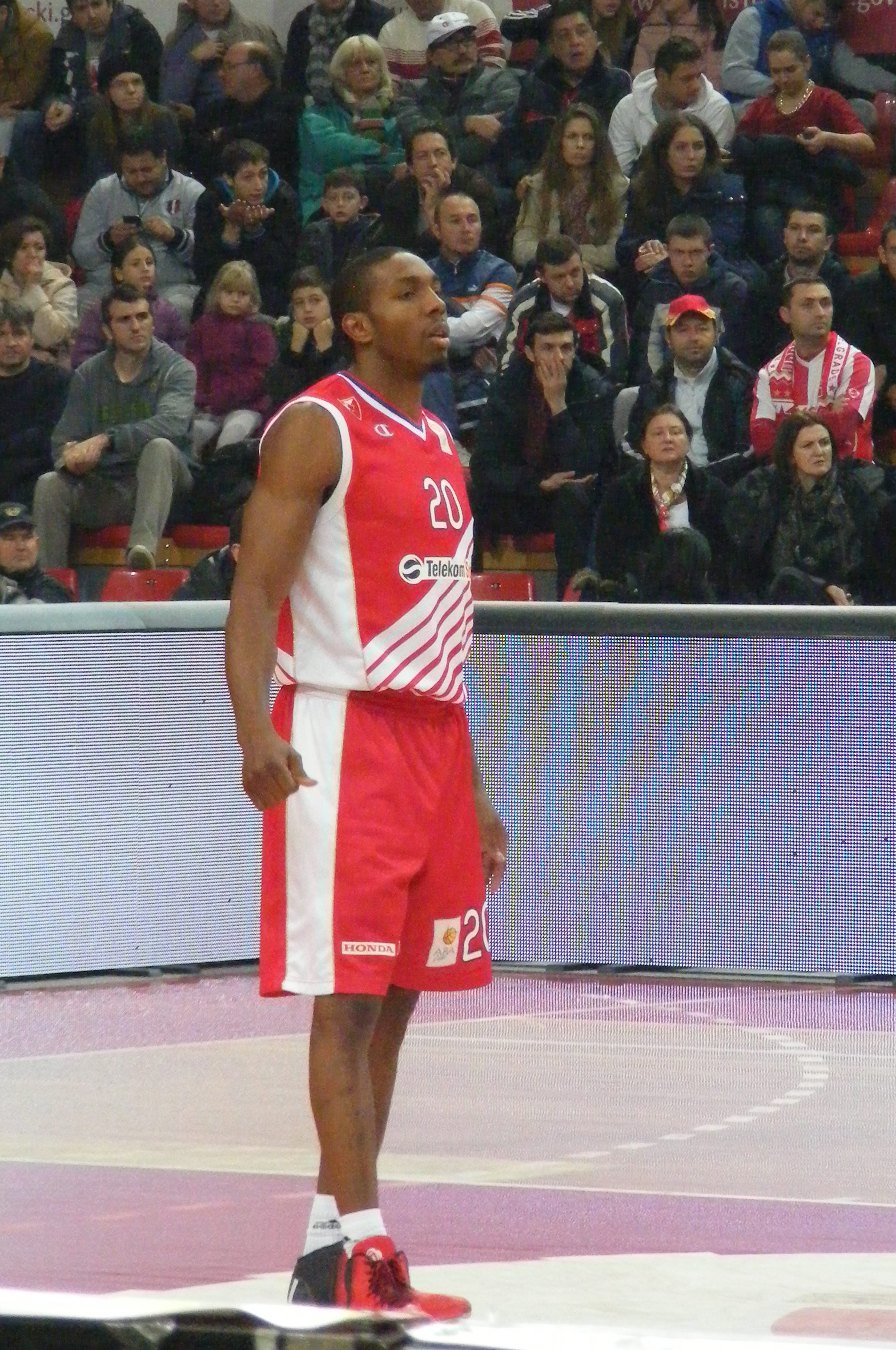
- Nelson with Crvena zvezda in 2013

Personal information
- Born: November 2, 1985 (age 41) Oakland, California, U.S.
- Listed height: 6 ft 4 in (1.93 m)
- Listed weight: 200 lb (91 kg)

Career information
- High school: Vallejo (Vallejo, California); Sheldon (Sacramento, California)
- College: Duke (2004–2008)
- NBA draft: 2008: undrafted
- Playing career: 2008–2020
- Position: Point guard
- Number: 20

Career history
- 2008–2009: Golden State Warriors
- 2008: Bakersfield Jam
- 2009: Zagreb
- 2009: Austin Toros
- 2009–2010: Air Avellino
- 2010–2011: Cholet Basket
- 2011: Donetsk
- 2011–2012: Cholet Basket
- 2012–2014: Crvena zvezda
- 2014–2015: Panathinaikos
- 2015: Monaco
- 2015–2016: Unicaja
- 2016–2019: ASVEL Basket
- 2019–2020: Bayern Munich
- 2020: Limoges CSP

Career highlights
- All-EuroCup First Team (2014); French League champion (2019); French League Finals MVP (2019); French Federation Cup winner (2019); Greek Cup winner (2015); All-ABA League Team (2014); 2× Serbian Cup winner (2013, 2014); Serbian Cup MVP (2013); French League All-Star (2016); Third-team All-American – NABC (2008); ACC Defensive Player of the Year (2008); First-team All-ACC (2008); ACC All-Defensive team (2008); ACC All-Freshman Team (2005); Second-team Parade All-American (2004); McDonald's All-American (2004); California Mr. Basketball (2004)
- Stats at NBA.com
- Stats at Basketball Reference

DeMarcus De'Juan Nelson (born November 2, 1985) is an American former professional basketball player. Standing at 1.93 m (6 ft 4 in) he played at the point guard position. He also holds Serbian citizenship as of 2014.

== College career ==
Nelson played at the shooting guard position on the Duke Blue Devils men's basketball team. He was also the lone captain of the team for the 2007–08 season, which was his senior year.

=== College statistics ===
College	Year	GP	MIN	SPG	BPG	RPG	APG	PPG	FG%	FT%	3P%
Duke	2004–05	33	19.2	0.8	0.3	4.5	0.8	6.2	.400	.532	.319
Duke	2005–06	24	21.5	0.8	0.1	3.4	1.2	7.1	.452	.649	.410
Duke	2006–07	33	31.9	1.3	0.5	5.4	2.0	14.1	.478	.593	.364
Duke	2007–08	34	30.9	1.6	0.3	5.8	2.9	14.5	.490	.601	.388

== Professional career ==
Nelson was not drafted in the 2008 NBA draft, but he was signed by the Golden State Warriors on September 9, 2008. He became the first undrafted rookie to start on opening night in the history of the National Basketball Association (NBA). On November 14, 2008, he and teammate Richard Hendrix were assigned to the Bakersfield Jam of the NBA D-League. He was recalled by the Warriors on December 16, 2008, but he was waived on January 6, 2009, to make room for Jermareo Davidson.

Nelson joined the Croatian Adriatic League club KK Zagreb in January 2009, but only played a single game. In March 2009, Nelson returned to the NBA D-League as a member of the Austin Toros.

On April 9, 2009, Nelson signed with the Chicago Bulls. On July 30, 2009, he was waived by the Bulls.

On August 29, 2009, he was signed by Scandone Avellino of the Italian Lega Basket Serie A for the 2009–10 season.

He played for the Milwaukee Bucks in the NBA Summer League in 2010.

On August 23, 2010, he was signed by Cholet Basket of France. Cholet Basket is qualified for the Euroleague for the 2010–11 season.

In July 2011 he signed with BC Donetsk in Ukraine. On November 15, 2011, he returned to Cholet Basket by signing a contract for the rest of the season.

In September 2012, he signed a one-year contract with the Serbian team Crvena zvezda. In June 2013 he re-signed with them for one more season, with an option for a second year. He became the first foreign player to stay at the club for two seasons.

In November 2013, he was named EuroLeague MVP for Round 4. In April 2014, along with his teammate Boban Marjanović, he was selected to the Ideal Team of the 2013–14 ABA League season. He was also named to the All-EuroCup First Team in 2014.

On July 22, 2014, Panathinaikos announced the signing of Nelson, on a 1+1 year-deal.

On September 25, 2015, he signed a one-month deal with the French team Monaco, with the role to replace injured Larry Drew II. On December 23, 2015, he signed for the rest of the season with the Spanish team Unicaja, with the role to replace injured Stefan Marković.

On October 15, 2016, Nelson signed with ASVEL Basket for the rest of the 2016–17 season. On July 8, 2017, he re-signed with ASVEL for two more seasons.

On January 29, 2020, he has signed with Limoges CSP of the LNB Pro A. Nelson re-signed with the team to a two-year extension on July 8, 2020.

== Career statistics ==
Legend
GP	Games played	GS	Games started	MPG	Minutes per game
FG%	Field-goal percentage	3P%	3-point field-goal percentage	FT%	Free-throw percentage
RPG	Rebounds per game	APG	Assists per game	SPG	Steals per game
BPG	Blocks per game	PPG	Points per game	PIR	Performance index rating
**Bold**	Career high

=== Regular season ===
Year	Team	GP	GS	MPG	FG%	3P%	FT%	RPG	APG	SPG	BPG	PPG
2008–09	Golden State	13	5	13.2	.444	.000	.357	1.8	1.0	.7	.2	4.1
Career		13	5	13.2	.444	.000	.357	1.8	1.0	.7	.2	4.1

=== Domestic leagues ===
Season	Team	League	GP	MPG	FG%	3P%	FT%	RPG	APG	SPG	BPG	PPG
2008–09	Bakersfield Jam	D-League	9	32.7	.569	.300	.576	4.8	4.0	2.2	.2	16.0
2008–09	Austin Toros	D-League	11	41.4	.564	.450	.803	5.9	4.2	1.2	.5	23.0
2008–09	KK Zagreb	Adriatic League	1	13.0	.333	--	--	.0	.0	.0	1.0	2.0
2009–10	Air Avellino	Lega A	28	25.8	.510	.220	.770	3.6	1.2	1.6	.4	9.0
2010–11	Cholet Basket	Pro A	34	25.0	.509	.271	.744	3.5	2.4	.9	.4	10.8
2011–12	BC Donetsk	SuperLeague	12	22.3	.532	.250	.796	4.4	2.5	1.6	.2	10.6
2011–12	Cholet Basket	Pro A	30	30.0	.516	.265	.804	3.8	3.6	1.3	.2	13.7
2012–13	KK Crvena zvezda	Adriatic League	28	26.4	.533	.273	.637	3.8	3.5	1.0	.3	8.6
2012–13	KK Crvena zvezda	KLS	19	28.8	.524	.410	.635	4.2	3.8	1.8	.4	11.4
2013–14	KK Crvena zvezda	Adriatic League	27	25.5	.604	.236	.712	3.2	3.3	1.5	.1	9.8
2013–14	KK Crvena zvezda	KLS	18	25.4	.500	.373	.732	3.6	4.0	1.6	.0	10.7
2014–15	Panathinaikos B.C.	Greek A1	23	18.4	.505	.259	.527	3.4	2.0	.7	.0	6.5

=== EuroLeague ===
Year	Team	GP	GS	MPG	FG%	3P%	FT%	RPG	APG	SPG	BPG	PPG	PIR
2010–11	Cholet	10	7	25.6	.423	**.313**	.636	3.3	1.5	.5	**.3**	9.2	5.8
2013–14	Crvena zvezda	10	**10**	**26.8**	**.479**	.286	**.737**	**4.0**	**3.2**	**1.1**	.2	**11.2**	**13.0**
2014–15	Panathinaikos	**18**	0	17.8	.402	.130	.625	2.4	2.2	.6	.2	5.8	5.6
Career		38	17	22.2	.434	.239	.658	3.1	2.3	.7	.2	8.1	7.6

== Personal life ==
DeMarcus attended high school at Vallejo High School in Vallejo, California and Sheldon High School in Sacramento, California. His Freshman, Sophomore, and Junior years were at Vallejo and his Senior year was at Sheldon.

He attained Serbian citizenship on July 24, 2014, late for a possible extension with Crvena zvezda.

== See also ==
- List of KK Crvena zvezda players with 100 games played
