= Raško Katić =

Serbian basketball player

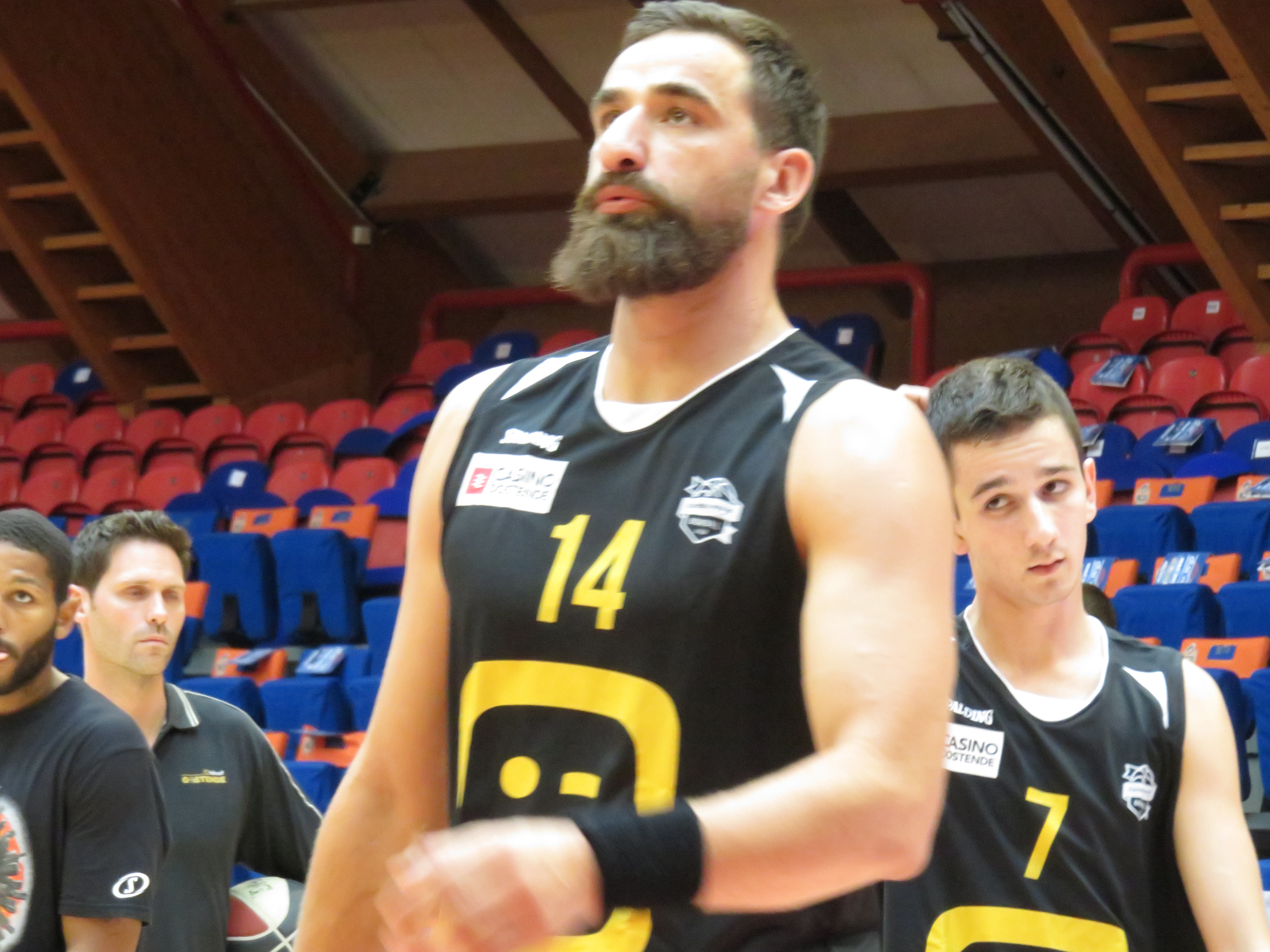
- Katić with Oostende in 2016

No. 41 – Sloga Batočina
- Position: Center

Personal information
- Born: 8 December 1980 (age 45) Kragujevac, SR Serbia, SFR Yugoslavia
- Listed height: 2.08 m (6 ft 10 in)
- Listed weight: 114 kg (251 lb)

Career information
- NBA draft: 2002: undrafted
- Playing career: 2002–present

Career history
- 2002–2004: Zastava
- 2004–2005: Crvena zvezda
- 2005: İTÜ
- 2005: Ergonom
- 2005–2009: Walter Tigers Tübingen
- 2009–2010: Hemofarm
- 2010–2012: Partizan
- 2012–2014: Crvena zvezda
- 2014–2015: CAI Zaragoza
- 2015–2017: Telenet Oostende
- 2017–2019: Spirou Charleroi
- 2019–2022: Radnički Kragujevac
- 2022: Stragari
- 2022–present: Sloga Batočina

Career highlights
- Adriatic League champion (2011); 2× Serbian League champion (2011, 2012); 4× Serbian Cup winner (2011–2014); 2× Belgian League champion (2016, 2017); 2× Belgian Cup winner (2016, 2017); Adriatic League Final Four MVP (2013)
Medals
Men's basketball
Representing Serbia
World Cup
Silver medal – second place	2014 Spain	Team

Raško Katić (Serbian: Рашко Катић, born 8 December 1980) is a Serbian professional basketball player for Sloga Batočina of the Second Regional Basketball League of Serbia. He represented the Serbian national basketball team internationally. Standing at 2.08 m (6 ft 10 in), he played the center position.

== Professional career ==
Katić began his professional basketball career with KK Zastava in Kragujevac, where he played until mid-season 2003–04. In January 2004, he was hired by the Crvena zvezda, where he spent one year.

In January 2005, he signed with Turkish club İTÜ where he was released after appearing in only six games. He then returned to Serbia and played two games with KK Ergonom. Gaming capacity has been fully demonstrated in the uniform of the German team Walter Tigers Tübingen, where he became a favorite of the local audience. With them, he played four seasons (2005–2009).

In 2010, Katić came to Hemofarm where he played one season. In 2010, he signed with Partizan Belgrade. With them he spent two seasons, and played for the first time in his career in EuroLeague.

In August 2012, Katić returned to Crvena zvezda signing a two-year contract. On 29 September 2014, Katić signed a one-year deal with the Spanish club CAI Zaragoza. On 16 July 2015, Katić signed a one-plus-one year contract with the Belgian club Telenet Oostende. On 10 June 2016, he re-signed with Oostende for one more season. On 6 June 2017, Katić signed for Spirou Charleroi for the 2017–18 season.

In July 2019, Katić announced his retirement from playing career. Despite his announcement, on 1 August he signed for Kragujevački Radnički of the Second Men's League of Serbia.

On 10 October 2020, a 40-year old Katić scored 41 points in a 91–80 win over Napredak JKP.

== National team career ==
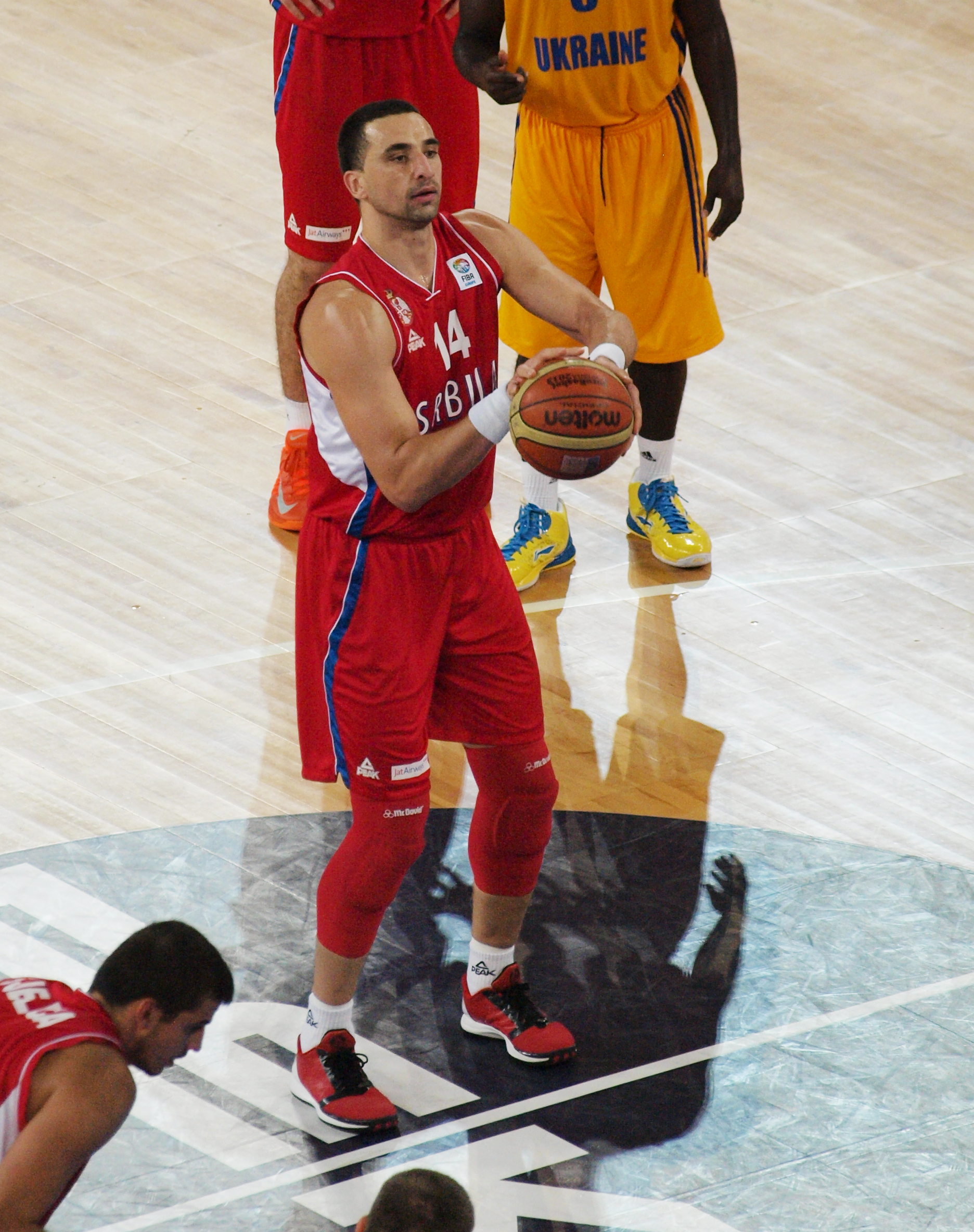
Katić playing with the Serbian national basketball team.

Katić represented the Serbia men's national basketball team at the EuroBasket 2013. Katić was a member of the Serbian national basketball team that won the silver medal at the 2014 FIBA Basketball World Cup.

== Career statistics ==
Legend
GP	Games played	GS	Games started	MPG	Minutes per game
FG%	Field-goal percentage	3P%	3-point field-goal percentage	FT%	Free-throw percentage
RPG	Rebounds per game	APG	Assists per game	SPG	Steals per game
BPG	Blocks per game	PPG	Points per game	PIR	Performance index rating
**Bold**	Career high

=== EuroLeague ===
Year	Team	GP	GS	MPG	FG%	3P%	FT%	RPG	APG	SPG	BPG	PPG	PIR
2010–11	Partizan	**16**	**9**	**17.0**	.489	.000	.742	**4.2**	.3	.4	**.3**	6.9	**7.1**
2011–12	Partizan	7	0	10.7	**.591**	.000	**.750**	.9	.1	.3	**.3**	5.4	3.9
2013–14	Crvena zvezda	10	1	16.7	.429	.000	.647	2.7	**.6**	**.5**	.2	**7.6**	4.6
Career		33	10	15.6	.480	.000	.704	3.0	.4	.4	.2	6.8	5.6

== See also ==
- List of Serbia men's national basketball team players
