= Michael Scott (basketball) =

American basketball player

Personal information
- Born: March 13, 1986 (age 40) Indianapolis, Indiana
- Listed height: 5 ft 8 in (1.73 m)
- Listed weight: 190 lb (86 kg)

Career information
- High school: Northwest (Indianapolis, Indiana)
- College: Kent State (2004–2008)
- NBA draft: 2008: undrafted
- Playing career: 2008–2013
- Position: Small forward

Career history
- 2008–2009: Trabzonspor
- 2009–2010: Körmend
- 2010–2011: Göttingen
- 2011–2012: Radnički Kragujevac
- 2012: Spirou Charleroi
- 2012–2013: Crvena zvezda
- 2013: Élan Béarnais Pau-Orthez

Career highlights
- Serbian Cup winner (2013); Hungarian League All Star (2010); Second-team All-MAC (2008)

Michael Anthony Scott (born March 13, 1986) is an American former professional basketball player.

== College career ==
Scott played 4 seasons of college basketball at the Kent State University from 2004 to 2008.

== Professional career ==
Scott went undrafted in the 2008 NBA draft. For the 2008–09 season he signed with Trabzonspor Basketball of the Turkish Basketball Second League.

For the 2009–10 season he signed with BC Körmend of Hungary. In September 2010, he signed with BG Göttingen of Germany for the 2010–11 season.

On October 27, 2011, he signed with Radnički Kragujevac of Serbia for the 2011–12 season. In 33 games of Adriatic League, he averaged 17.5 points and 6.6 rebounds per game.

On August 15, 2012, he signed with Spirou Charleroi of Belgium. However, he left Charleroi after playing only four games in Belgian League, and returned to Serbia to sign with Crvena zvezda for the rest of the 2012–13 season. With Zvezda he won the Serbian Cup in 2013.

On August 9, 2013, he signed with Élan Béarnais Pau-Orthez of France for the 2013–14 season. He parted ways with Pau-Orthez on December 5, 2013. In 5 games of the LNB Pro A he averaged 3.6 points and 2.8 rebounds per game.
