= Milan Milovanović (basketball) =

Serbian basketball player (born 1991)

Free agent
- Position: Center

Personal information
- Born: September 7, 1991 (age 35) Niš, SFR Yugoslavia
- Listed height: 6 ft 9.5 in (2.07 m)

Career information
- NBA draft: 2013: undrafted
- Playing career: 2010–present

Career history
- 2010–2011: FMP
- 2011–2012: Radnički FMP
- 2012–2013: Crvena zvezda
- 2013: Vojvodina Srbijagas
- 2013–2014: Mega Vizura
- 2014–2015: Balkan Botevgrad
- 2016: Konstantin
- 2016: Phoenix Galați
- 2016–2017: Prievidza
- 2017: Borac Čačak
- 2017–2018: Starogard Gdański
- 2018–2019: Trefl Sopot
- 2019: Anwil Włocławek
- 2020: Legia Warszawa
- 2020–2021: Krka
- 2021–2022: Denain Voltaire Basket
- 2022–2023: Borac Čačak

Career highlights
- Serbian Cup winner (2013); Polish Supercup winner (2019); Slovenian Cup winner (2021)

Milan Milovanović (Serbian Cyrillic: Милан Миловановић; born August 7, 1991) is a Serbian professional basketball player who last played for Borac Čačak of the ABA League.

== Professional career ==
At the junior level Milovanović won the 2009 Nike International Junior Tournament with KK FMP. He later made his professional debut with FMP during the 2010–11 season. For the 2011–12 season he moved to Radnički FMP. In the 2012–13 season he played for Crvena zvezda.

On September 27, 2013, he signed with Vojvodina Srbijagas. On December 15, 2013, he left Vojvodina and signed with Mega Vizura for the rest of the 2013–14 season.

On July 23, 2014, he signed with Bulgarian club Balkan Botevgrad for the 2014–15 season.

In May 2016, he signed with Konstantin for the 2016 Serbian Super League season.

On July 25, 2016, Milovanović signed with Romanian club Phoenix Galați. On December 12, 2016, he left Galați after appearing in eleven games. Three days later, he signed with Slovak club Prievidza. On March 7, 2017, he was released by Prievidza. Four days later he returned to Serbia and signed with Borac Čačak for the rest of the season.

On June 29, 2017, Milovanović signed with Polish club Polpharma Starogard Gdański.

On July 31, 2019, Milovanović has signed with Anwil Włocławek of the PLK.

On November 11, 2019, Milovanović has signed with Legia Warszawa of the Polish Basketball League.

On August 31, 2020, Milovanović has signed with Krka of the Slovenian League. Milovanović averaged 5.0 points and 2.9 rebounds per game. On October 10, 2021, he signed with Denain Voltaire Basket in the LNB Pro B. On September 27, 2022, Milovanović signed with Borac Čačak of the ABA League. He parted ways with Borac in January 2023.

== Serbian national team ==
Milovanović has been a member of the junior national teams of Serbia. With the Serbia under-20 national team he played at the 2011 FIBA Europe Under-20 Championship in Spain. He also played at the 2015 Summer Universiade in Gwangju.
