= Boris Savović =

Serbian basketball player (born 1987)

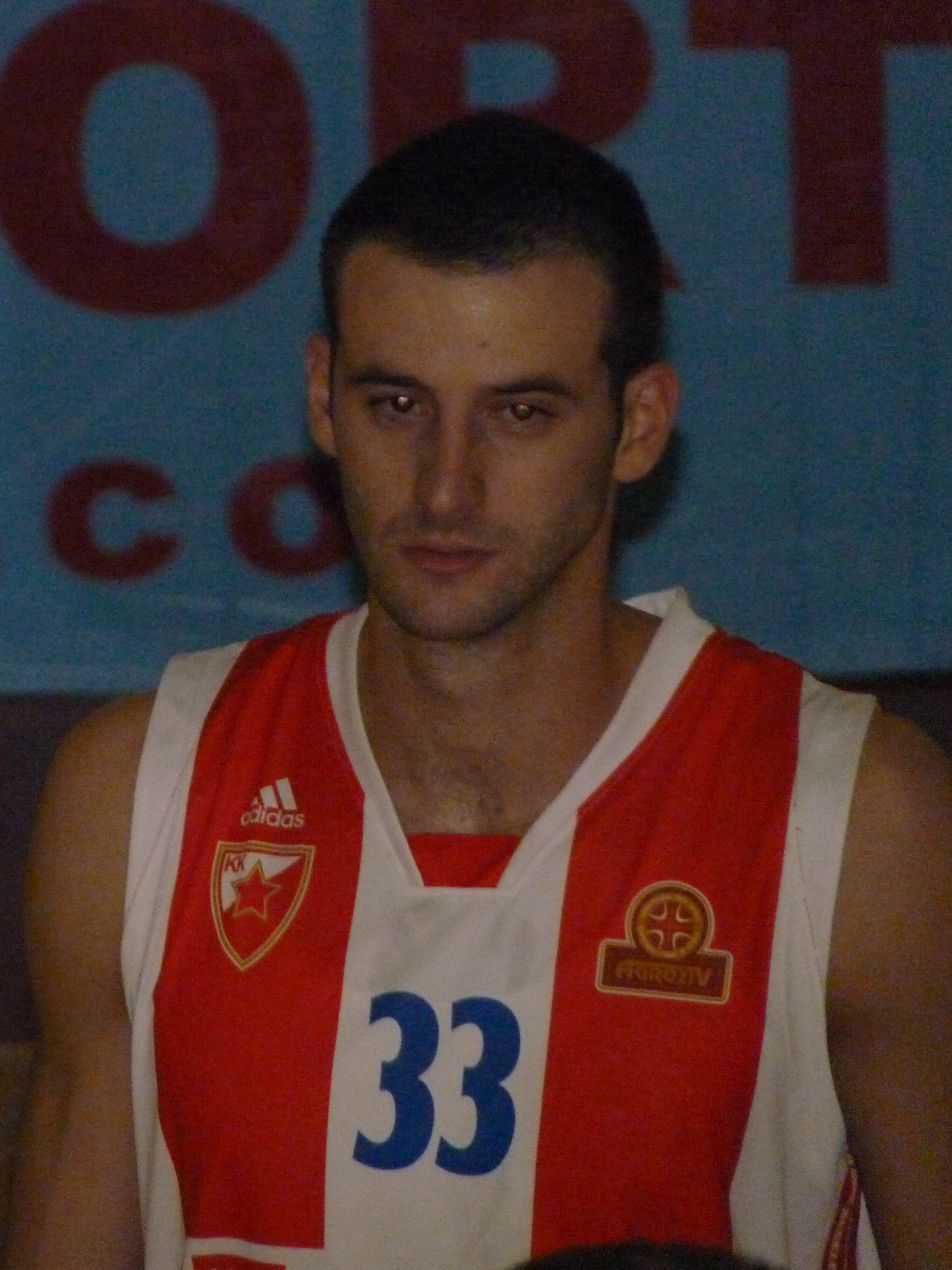
- Savović with Crvena zvezda

Personal information
- Born: June 18, 1987 (age 39) Trebinje, SR Bosnia and Herzegovina, SFR Yugoslavia
- Listed height: 2.10 m (6 ft 11 in)
- Listed weight: 105 kg (231 lb)

Career information
- NBA draft: 2009: undrafted
- Playing career: 2004–2024
- Position: Power forward / center

Career history
- 2004–2009: Hemofarm
- 2009–2010: Budućnost
- 2010–2012: Hemofarm
- 2012: Galatasaray Medical Park
- 2012–2013: Crvena zvezda
- 2013–2014: Bayern Munich
- 2014–2015: ratiopharm Ulm
- 2015: Budućnost
- 2015: Türk Telekom
- 2015–2016: Mega Leks
- 2016: Reyer Venezia Mestre
- 2016–2017: Budućnost
- 2017–2018: Stelmet Zielona Góra
- 2018: Avtodor
- 2019: Goyang Orions
- 2020–2021: Parma
- 2021: Enisey
- 2022: Mega Mozzart
- 2022–2023: OKK Beograd

Career highlights
- Adriatic League champion (2005); 3× Montenegrin League champion (2010, 2015, 2017); German League champion (2014); 3× Montenegrin Cup winner (2010, 2015, 2017); Serbian Cup winner (2013)

Boris Savović (Serbian Cyrillic: Борис Савовић; born June 18, 1987) is a Serbian-Montenegrin former professional basketball player. Standing at 2.10 meters, he mainly featured as a power forward or a center.

== Professional career ==
Savović began his professional career in 2004 with Hemofarm. In September 2009, he signed a one-year deal with the Montenegrin team Budućnost Podgorica.

In September 2010, he returned to Hemofarm, signing a one-year deal with an option to extend his contract for one more year. During the 2011–12 season of the Adriatic League he averaged 12.8 points and 11.4 rebounds per game. In January 2012, he moved to Turkey and signed with Galatasaray Medical Park for the rest of the season.

On 26 July 2012 he signed a two-year deal with Crvena zvezda. With them he won the Radivoj Korać Cup in 2013. He left Zvezda after one season.

On 26 September 2013, he signed a one-year deal with the German Euroleague club Bayern Munich. In June 2014, he left Bayern after club decided to not re-signed him.

On 18 July 2014, he signed a one-year deal with ratiopharm Ulm. On 20 February 2015, he left Ulm and signed with Budućnost VOLI for the remainder of the season.

On 11 June 2015, he signed with the Turkish club Türk Telekom. On December 13, 2015, he parted ways with Türk Telekom after appearing in six league games and three FIBA Europe Cup games. On December 25, 2015, he signed with Mega Leks. On January 15, 2016, he left Mega and signed with Italian club Reyer Venezia Mestre for the rest of the season.

On 5 July 2016, Savović returned to Budućnost for the 2016–17 season.

On 14 July 2017, Savović signed with Polish club Stelmet Zielona Góra for the 2017–18 season.

On March 3, 2020, Savović has signed with Parma of the VTB United League. On September 4, 2021, Savović signed with BC Enisey. On January 5, 2022, he signed a short-term contract for Mega Mozzart. Later, he sign for Al-Muharraq of the Bahraini Premier League, and KK Breg Vršac.
