= Jezero Hall =

Indoor sporting arena in Kragujevac, Serbia

Coordinates: 44.013615°N 20.923817°E

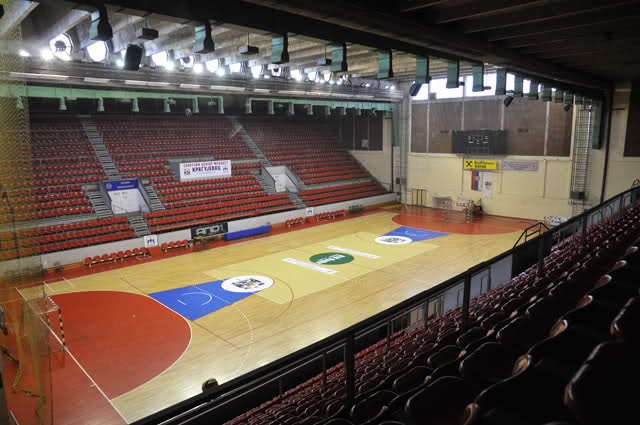
- Interactive map of Jezero Hall
- Location: Grada Sirena 15, 34000 Kragujevac, Serbia
- Owner: Mladost SC
- Capacity: 5,320

Construction
- Opened: 1978
- Architect: Veroljub M. Atanasijević

Tenants
- KK Radnički 1950; OK Radnički Kragujevac; RK Radnički Kragujevac; KMF Ekonomac Kragujevac

The Jezero Hall is an indoor sporting arena located in Kragujevac, Serbia. The capacity of the arena is 4,000 people. It is currently home to the Radnički Kragujevac basketball, volleyball teams and KMF Ekonomac Kragujevac

The first sporting event in the venue took place on 20 October 1978 with a basketball match between KK Radnički Kragujevac and KK Jugoplastika Split.

== See also ==
- List of indoor arenas in Serbia
- Kragujevac
