= 2009–10 KK Partizan season =

Basketball season

Partizan Belgrade
2009–10 season
- President: Predrag Danilović
- Head coach: Duško Vujošević
- Basketball League of Serbia: Champion
- Radivoj Korać Cup: Champion
- Adriatic League: Champion
- Euroleague: Final Four
- Highest home attendance: vs Maccabi Electra Tel Aviv (21,367)

The 2009–10 season was one of the most successful seasons in the history of KK Partizan. The club reached the F4 of Euroleague, won the regional NLB League, the Serbian cup and the Basketball League of Serbia.

== Players ==
=== Roster ===
KK Partizan roster
Players
Coaches

Pos.	No.	Nat.	Name	Ht.	Wt.	Age
F	4	(United States)	Roberts, Lawrence	2.06 m (6 ft 9 in)	109 kg (240 lb)	43 – 20 October 1982
G	5	(Serbia)	Sinovec, Stefan	1.95 m (6 ft 5 in)	88 kg (194 lb)	37 – 20 June 1988
G	6	(United States)	McCalebb, Bo	1.83 m (6 ft 0 in)	83 kg (183 lb)	40 – 4 May 1985
G	7	(Serbia)	Kecman, Dušan	1.97 m (6 ft 6 in)	93 kg (205 lb)	48 – 6 November 1977
F	8	(Serbia)	Milošević, Strahinja	2.03 m (6 ft 8 in)	104 kg (229 lb)	40 – 25 September 1985
G	10	(Serbia)	Rašić, Aleksandar	1.95 m (6 ft 5 in)	90 kg (198 lb)	42 – 16 March 1984
F	11	(Serbia)	Lučić, Vladimir	2.02 m (6 ft 8 in)	91 kg (201 lb)	36 – 17 June 1989
F	16	(Serbia)	Lešić, Sava	2.06 m (6 ft 9 in)	101 kg (223 lb)	38 – 23 February 1988
G	19	(Serbia)	Mitrović, Aleksandar	2.03 m (6 ft 8 in)	100 kg (220 lb)	35 – 22 July 1990
G	20	(Serbia)	Božić, Petar (C)	1.97 m (6 ft 6 in)	100 kg (220 lb)	47 – 6 December 1978
C	21	(Australia)	Marić, Aleks	2.11 m (6 ft 11 in)	125 kg (276 lb)	41 – 22 October 1984
C	22	(Serbia)	Balaban, Darko	2.10 m (6 ft 11 in)	105 kg (231 lb)	37 – 22 February 1989
F	24	(Czech Republic)	Veselý, Jan	2.11 m (6 ft 11 in)	110 kg (243 lb)	35 – 24 April 1990
F	31	(Serbia)	Đekić, Branislav	2.07 m (6 ft 9 in)	94 kg (207 lb)	34 – 12 August 1991
C	33	(Montenegro)	Vraneš, Slavko	2.29 m (7 ft 6 in)	135 kg (298 lb)	43 – 30 January 1983

Head coach

- (Serbia) Duško Vujošević

Assistant coach(es)

- (Serbia) Vlada Jovanović
- (Serbia) Miloš Gligorijević

Legend

- (C) Team captain
- Injured

- Roster
Updated: March 29, 2010

=== Depth chart ===
Pos.	Starting 5	Bench 1	Bench 2	Reserve
C	Aleks Marić	Slavko Vraneš		Darko Balaban
PF	Lawrence Roberts	Branislav Đekić		Sava Lešić
SF	Jan Vesely	Strahinja Milošević	Vladimir Lučić
SG	Dušan Kecman	Aleksandar Rašić	Stefan Sinovec	Aleksandar Mitrović
PG	Bo McCalebb	Petar Božić

=== Roster changes ===
In

- (Serbia) Sava Lešić (from (Serbia) Superfund)
- (Belize) Milt Palacio (from (Russia) Khimiki)
- (Serbia) Stefan Sinovec (from (Ukraine) Khimik)
- (Serbia) Aleksandar Mitrović (from (Serbia) Mega Hypo Leasing)
- (Australia) Aleks Marić (from (Spain) Granada)
- (Serbia) Dušan Kecman (from (Greece) Panathinaikos)
- (United States) Lawrence Roberts (from (Serbia) Crvena zvezda)
- (United States) Bo McCalebb (from (Turkey) Mersin BB)
- (Serbia) Branislav Đekić (from youth categories)

Out

- (Serbia) Milenko Tepić (to (Greece) Panathinaikos)
- (Serbia) Bogdan Riznić (to (Serbia) Vojvodina Srbijagas)
- (Serbia) Uroš Tripković (to (Spain) DKV Joventut)
- (Gabon) Stéphane Lasme (to (Israel) Maccabi Tel Aviv)
- (Serbia) Novica Veličković (to (Spain) Real Madrid)
- (Serbia) Čedomir Vitkovac (to (Montenegro) Budućnost Podgorica)
- (Serbia) Vukašin Aleksić (to (Serbia) Radnički Kragujevac)
- (Belize) Milt Palacio (to (Greece) Kavala)
- (Montenegro) Žarko Rakočević (to (Montenegro) Gorštak Kolašin)

== Preseason and friendlies ==
31 August 2009	Partizan Belgrade (Serbia)	71–76	(Ukraine) Khimik	Belgrade
	Scoring by quarter: 18–18, 15–20, 19–22, 19–16
	Pts: Rašić, Veselý 13	Report	Pts: Mitchell 17	Arena: Hala sportova

5 September 2009	Partizan Belgrade (Serbia)	71–74	(Serbia) OKK Beograd	Belgrade
	Scoring by quarter: 16–23, 16–24, 18–11, 21–16
	Pts: Milošević 16		Pts: Mitrović 17	Arena: Pionir Hall

8 September 2009	Partizan Belgrade (Serbia)	81–65	(Serbia) Metalac	Belgrade
	Scoring by quarter: 29–11, 23–21, 14–17, 14–16
	Pts: Đekić, Aleksić 14	Report	Pts: Stefanović 16	Arena: Hala sportova

28 September 2009	Midwest All-Star (United States)	82–88	(Serbia) Partizan Belgrade	Detroit, United States
	Scoring by quarter: 18–20, 12–20, 28–23, 24–25
	Pts: Berdiel 16	Report	Pts: Rašić 16

30 September 2009	Midwest All-Star (United States)	81–101	(Serbia) Partizan Belgrade	Detroit, United States
	Scoring by quarter: 14–19, 19–19, 17–30, 31–33
	Pts: Berdiel 18	Report	Pts: Marić 18

Euroleague US Tour

3 October 2009	Denver Nuggets (United States)	102–70	(Serbia) Partizan Belgrade	Denver, United States
	Scoring by quarter: 26–16, 24–17, 24–14, 28–23
	Pts: Anthony 17; Rebs: Balkman 6 Asts: Draper 5	Report	Pts: Marić 16; Rebs: Marić 21; Asts: Rakočević 5	Arena: Pepsi Center; Attendance: 9,749

6 October 2009	Phoenix Suns (United States)	111–80	(Serbia) Partizan Belgrade	Phoenix, United States
	Scoring by quarter: 20–19, 35–15, 36–24, 20–22
	Pts: Dragić 16; Rebs: Stoudemire, Clark 5 Asts: Dragić, Richardson 4	Report	Pts: Veselý 16; Rebs: Kecman 7 Asts: Rašić 5	Arena: US Airways Center; Attendance: 14,531

== Competitions ==
	Competition	Position	Record
(Serbia)	KLS SuperLeague	Winners	18–1
(Serbia)	Radivoj Korać Cup	Winners	3–0
(European Union)	ABA League	Winners	22–6
(European Union)	Euroleague	4th place	11–11

== Adriatic League ==
=== Standings ===
	Team	Pld	W	L	PF	PA	Diff	Pts
1	Cibona	26	20	6	2038	1802	236	46
2	Partizan Belgrade	26	20	6	2021	1842	179	46
3	Hemofarm STADA	26	17	9	2059	1912	147	43
4	Union Olimpija	26	15	11	2004	1875	129	41

==== Regular season ====
26 December 2009* 1	Partizan Belgrade (Serbia)	86–59	(Serbia) FMP	Belgrade
19:30	Scoring by quarter: 14–16, 26–15, 20–10, 26–18
	Pts: Rašić 13; Rebs: Vraneš, Marić 9 Asts: Kecman 6	Report	Pts: Protić 18; Rebs: Raduljica, Musli 4 Asts: Čović 4	Arena: Pionir Hall; Attendance: 5,001; Referees: Ilija Belošević (SRB), Tomislav Hordov (CRO), Josip Radojković (CRO)

14 October 2009 2	Partizan Belgrade (Serbia)	51–64	(Croatia) Cibona	Belgrade
18:00	Scoring by quarter: 14–14, 11–19, 13–10, 13–21
	Pts: Veselý 12; Rebs: Vraneš 9 Asts: Rašić 4	Report	Pts: Tomas 22; Rebs: Andrić 7 Asts: Gordon, Bogdanović 2	Arena: Pionir Hall; Attendance: 4,142; Referees: Matej Boltauzer (SLO), Roman Kolar (SLO), Radomir Vojinović (MNE)

17 October 2009 3	Helios (Slovenia)	67–73	(Serbia) Partizan Belgrade	Domžale
19:00	Scoring by quarter: 18–25, 16–11, 17–18, 16–19
	Pts: Moćnik 15; Rebs: Moćnik 6 Asts: Moćnik 7	Report	Pts: Marić 18; Rebs: Marić 11; Asts: Marić, Rašić, Sinovec 2	Arena: Komunalni center Hall; Attendance: 2,000

25 October 2009 4	Partizan Belgrade (Serbia)	84–80(OT)	(Serbia) Hemofarm STADA	Belgrade
17:00	Scoring by quarter: 18-12, 18–19, 18–21, 13–15, Overtime: 17–13
	Pts: Marić 20; Rebs: Marić 16; Asts: Kecman 4	Report	Pts: Šutalo 17; Rebs: Božović 9 Asts: Pavković 8	Arena: Pionir Hall; Attendance: 2,546; Referees: Srđan Dožai (CRO), Milivoje Jovčić (SRB), Aleksandar Glišić (SRB)

1 November 2009 5	Zadar (Croatia)	77–66	(Serbia) Partizan Belgrade	Zadar
20:00	Scoring by quarter: 13–10, 26–17, 17–20, 21–19
	Pts: Stipčević 18; Rebs: Perić 5 Asts: Stipčević 4	Report	Pts: Veselý, Marić 16; Rebs: Marić 16; Asts: Roberts, Rašić 2	Arena: Krešimir Ćosić Hall; Attendance: 7,000; Referees: Sašo Pukl (SLO), Matej Boltauzer (SLO), Andrej Lovšin (SLO)

7 November 2009 6	Partizan Belgrade (Serbia)	72–58	(Bosnia and Herzegovina) Bosna ASA BHT	Belgrade
19:30	Scoring by quarter: 19–8, 26–20, 8–11, 19–19
	Pts: Marić 16; Rebs: Roberts 8 Asts: Rašić 5	Report	Pts: Bajić 19; Rebs: Bajić, Hajrić 7 Asts: Kojadinović 5	Arena: Pionir Hall; Attendance: 1,455; Referees: Sreten Radović (CRO), Tomislav Hordov (CRO), Josip Radojković (CRO)

15 November 2009 7	Budućnost m:tel (Montenegro)	59–65	(Serbia) Partizan Belgrade	Podgorica
19:15	Scoring by quarter: 15–18, 14–16, 21–14, 9–16
	Pts: Dragičević 20; Rebs: Barović 6 Asts: Šehović 2	Report	Pts: McCalebb 21; Rebs: Marić 7 Asts: McCalebb 4	Arena: Morača Sports Center; Attendance: 4,500; Referees: Dubravko Muhvić (CRO), Petar Obradović (BIH), Bojan Jovanić (BIH)

19 November 2009 8	Partizan Belgrade (Serbia)	73–76	(Serbia) Crvena zvezda	Belgrade
19:30	Scoring by quarter: 16–18, 19–18, 19–18, 19–22
	Pts: McCalebb 16; Rebs: Roberts, Marić 9 Asts: Veselý 3	Report	Pts: Bjelica 14; Rebs: Bjelica, Štimac, Dragićević 5 Asts: Videnov 3	Arena: Pionir Hall; Attendance: 4,350; Referees: Sreten Radović (CRO), Dragan Medan (CRO), Tomislav Vovk (CRO)

21 November 2009 9	Zagreb CO (Croatia)	85–83	(Serbia) Partizan Belgrade	Zagreb
20:00	Scoring by quarter: 26–21, 15–23, 20–17, 24–22
	Pts: Mulaomerović, Tomić 24; Rebs: Tomić 11; Asts: Mulaomerović 6	Report	Pts: Kecman 25; Rebs: Marić, Veselý 5 Asts: McCalebb 5	Arena: Trnsko Sports Hall; Attendance: 2,500; Referees: Roman Kolar (SLO), Nikola Lepetić (MNE), Edin Husarić (BiH)

28 November 2009 10	Partizan Belgrade (Serbia)	80–70	(Slovenia) Union Olimpija	Belgrade
19:30	Scoring by quarter: 29–18, 22–14, 14–19, 15–19
	Pts: Kecman 18; Rebs: Vraneš 9 Asts: Kecman 4	Report	Pts: Bečirovič 19; Rebs: Bavčić Vidmar, Walsh 4 Asts: Bečirovič Ožbolt 3	Arena: Pionir Hall; Attendance: 2,268; Referees: Srđan Dožai (CRO), Siniša Herceg (CRO), Josip Radojković (CRO)

5 December 2009 11	Radnički (Serbia)	67–73	(Serbia) Partizan Belgrade	Kragujevac
18:00	Scoring by quarter: 28–21, 13–17, 15–16, 11–19
	Pts: Brkić 19; Rebs: Brkić 6 Asts: Brkić 5	Report	Pts: McCalebb, Marić 12; Rebs: Marić 12; Asts: Božić 3	Arena: Jezero Hall; Attendance: 4,000; Referees: Ilija Belošević (SRB), Petar Obradović (BIH), Dragan Kralj (BIH)

12 December 2009 12	Partizan Belgrade (Serbia)	95–75	(Croatia) Cedevita	Belgrade
19:30	Scoring by quarter: 32–18, 19–15, 28–10, 16–32
	Pts: Rašić 19; Rebs: Roberts 10; Asts: McCalebb 8	Report	Pts: Baždarić 21; Rebs: Kaštropil 6 Asts: Anderson 3	Arena: Pionir Hall; Attendance: 1,210; Referees: Zoran Šutulović (MNE), Damir Javor (SLO), Haris Bijedić (BIH)

20 December 2009 13	Široki HT Eronet (Bosnia and Herzegovina)	48–63	(Serbia) Partizan Belgrade	Široki Brijeg
19:30	Scoring by quarter: 22–12, 12–19, 8–21, 6–13
	Pts: Puljko 10; Rebs: Grgat, Špralja 8 Asts: Mason 6	Report	Pts: Rašić 19; Rebs: Marić 11; Asts: Marić 4	Arena: Pecara Hall; Attendance: 3,500; Referees: Sašo Pukl (SLO), Andrej Lovšin (SLO), Zdravko Rutešić (MNE)

23 December 2009 14	FMP (Serbia)	81–84	(Serbia) Partizan Belgrade	Belgrade
18:00	Scoring by quarter: 19–26, 23–21, 21–23, 18–14
	Pts: Protić 27; Rebs: Raduljica, Samardžiski 6 Asts: Protić, Čović 3	Report	Pts: Marić, McCalebb 18; Rebs: Roberts 8 Asts: Božić 5	Arena: Železnik Hall; Attendance: 2,000; Referees: Milivoje Jovčić (SRB), Milija Vojinović (SRB), Časlav Čukalović (SRB)

10 January 2010 15	Cibona (Croatia)	69–59	(Serbia) Partizan Belgrade	Zagreb
16:15	Scoring by quarter: 25–18, 11–15, 13–16, 20–10
	Pts: Tomas 24; Rebs: Andrić 6 Asts: Gordon 6	Report	Pts: Roberts 16; Rebs: Vraneš 15; Asts: McCalebb 3	Arena: Dražen Petrović Basketball Hall; Attendance: 3,000; Referees: Zoran Šutulović (MNE), Roman Kolar (SLO), Damir Javor (SLO)

16 January 2010 16	Partizan Belgrade (Serbia)	84–76	(Slovenia) Helios	Belgrade
19:30	Scoring by quarter: 23–21, 22–13, 19–17, 20–25
	Pts: Roberts 15; Rebs: Vraneš 13; Asts: Kecman 4	Report	Pts: Snow 20; Rebs: Lashkevich, Petrovič, Paravinja 3 Asts: Moćnik 5	Arena: Pionir Hall; Attendance: 1,526; Referees: Dubravko Muhvić (CRO), Tomislav Vovk (CRO), Tomislav Hordov (CRO)

19 January 2010 17	Hemofarm STADA (Serbia)	90–91	(Serbia) Partizan Belgrade	Vršac
18:30	Scoring by quarter: 21–24, 25–18, 23–25, 21–24
	Pts: Mačvan 19; Rebs: Mačvan 9 Asts: Pavković 7	Report	Pts: McCalebb, Rašić 18; Rebs: Vraneš 11; Asts: McCalebb, Rašić 5	Arena: Millennium Center; Attendance: 3,000; Referees: Siniša Herceg (CRO), Saša Maričić (SRB), Radomir Vojinović (MNE)

23 January 2010 18	Partizan Belgrade (Serbia)	86–74	(Croatia) Zadar	Belgrade
19:30	Scoring by quarter: 27–15, 24–24, 18–13, 17–22
	Pts: Roberts 15; Rebs: Roberts, Vraneš 8 Asts: Božić 4	Report	Pts: Stipčević, Rančić 16; Rebs: Ružić 9 Asts: Stipčević, Perić 2	Arena: Pionir Hall; Attendance: 4,763; Referees: Damir Javor (SLO), Roman Kolar (SLO), Andrej Jeršan (SLO)

15 March 2010* 19	Bosna ASA BHT (Bosnia and Herzegovina)	84–86(OT)	(Serbia) Partizan Belgrade	Sarajevo
19:30	Scoring by quarter: 20–22, 21–20, 12–11, 22–22, Overtime: 9-11
	Pts: Rakočević 24; Rebs: Kojadinović, Šehović 5 Asts: Kojadinović 6	Report	Pts: Marić 18; Rebs: Marić 9 Asts: McCalebb 3	Arena: Olympic Hall Zetra; Attendance: 3,500; Referees: Sreten Radović (CRO), Zdravko Rutešić (MNE), Ognjen Jokić (MNE)

6 February 2010 20	Partizan Belgrade (Serbia)	75–56	(Montenegro) Budućnost m:tel	Belgrade
18:00	Scoring by quarter: 12–10, 23–15, 23–13, 17–18
	Pts: McCalebb 18; Rebs: Milošević 11; Asts: Rašić 5	Report	Pts: Vitkovac 13; Rebs: Vitkovac 7 Asts: Otašević, Gordić 4	Arena: Pionir Hall; Attendance: 3,742; Referees: Dubravko Muhvić (CRO), Dragan Medan (CRO), Josip Radojković (CRO)

14 February 2010 21	Crvena zvezda (Serbia)	74–84	(Serbia) Partizan Belgrade	Belgrade
19:30	Scoring by quarter: 17–21, 13–12, 19–25, 25–26
	Pts: Videnov 15; Rebs: Stević 10; Asts: Taylor 2	Report	Pts: Veselý 21; Rebs: Roberts 8 Asts: Roberts, Božić 3	Arena: Pionir Hall; Attendance: 5,000; Referees: Siniša Herceg (CRO), Matej Boltauzer (SLO), Tomislav Hordov (CRO)

27 February 2010 22	Partizan Belgrade (Serbia)	90–70	(Croatia) Zagreb CO	Belgrade
19:30	Scoring by quarter: 28–24, 24–16, 20–13, 18–17
	Pts: Roberts 14; Rebs: Roberts, Vraneš 9 Asts: McCalebb 7	Report	Pts: Žorić 26; Rebs: Žorić 9 Asts: Simon 5	Arena: Pionir Hall; Attendance: 2,845; Referees: Roman Kolar (SLO), Andrej Jeršan (SLO), Haris Bijedić (BIH)

7 March 2010 23	Union Olimpija (Slovenia)	73–81	(Serbia) Partizan Belgrade	Ljubljana
12:00	Scoring by quarter: 17–21, 24–16, 14–23, 18–21
	Pts: Ilievski 16; Rebs: Klobučar 7 Asts: Ilievski 3	Report	Pts: Veselý 27; Rebs: Veselý, Vraneš, Roberts 6 Asts: Kecman, Božić 3	Arena: Arena Stožice; Attendance: 1,400; Referees: Sreten Radović (CRO), Petar Obradović (BIH), Tomislav Vovk (CRO)

13 March 2010 24	Partizan Belgrade (Serbia)	85–62	(Serbia) Radnički	Belgrade
19:30	Scoring by quarter: 16–21, 23–13, 22–3, 24–25
	Pts: Rašić, Božić 15; Rebs: Roberts 8 Asts: Kecman, Roberts 4	Report	Pts: Aleksić 10; Rebs: Čakarević 8 Asts: Urazmanov 2	Arena: Pionir Hall; Attendance: 2,550; Referees: Radomir Vojinović (MNE), Branislav Mrdak (SRB), Edin Husarić (BiH)

17 March 2010 25	Cedevita (Croatia)	79–72	(Serbia) Partizan Belgrade	Zagreb
19:00	Scoring by quarter: 25–24, 23–19, 13–19, 18–10
	Pts: Baždarić 20; Rebs: Žižić 7 Asts: Anderson 3	Report	Pts: McCalebb 19; Rebs: Marić 8 Asts: Božić 4	Arena: Dom Sportova; Attendance: 1,800; Referees: Damir Javor (SLO), Andrej Jeršan (SLO), Andrej Lovšin (SLO)

20 March 2010 26	Partizan Belgrade (Serbia)	80–69	(Bosnia and Herzegovina) Široki HT Eronet	Belgrade
18:00	Scoring by quarter: 27–7, 22–20, 14–18, 17–24
	Pts: Marić 12; Rebs: Vraneš 7 Asts: Kecman 5	Report	Pts: Mileković 19; Rebs: Mason 11; Asts: Mason 6	Arena: Pionir Hall; Attendance: 720; Referees: Marko Juras (SRB), Aleksandar Glišić (SRB), Bojan Jovanić (BIH)

=== Final four ===
Semifinals; April 23
1	Cibona	78
4	Union Olimpija	73
2	Partizan Belgrade	72
3	Hemofarm STADA	67

Final; April 25
1	Cibona	74
2	Partizan Belgrade	75 (OT)

==== Semifinals ====
23 April 2010	Partizan Belgrade (Serbia)	72–67	(Serbia) Hemofarm STADA	Zagreb
17:15	Scoring by quarter: 14–18, 26–16, 12–12, 20–21
	Pts: Roberts 16; Rebs: Roberts 11; Asts: Božić, Marić, McCalebb 2	Report	Pts: Mačvan 16; Rebs: Marjanović 9 Asts: Marković, Borisov 2	Arena: Arena Zagreb; Attendance: - Referees: Srđan Dožai (CRO), Siniša Herceg (CRO), Saša Maričić (SRB)

==== Final ====
25 April 2010	Cibona (Croatia)	74–75(OT)	(Serbia) Partizan Belgrade	Zagreb
17:15	Scoring by quarter: 14–15, 17–16, 13–13, 16–16, Overtime: 14–15
	Pts: Gordon, Tomas 31; Rebs: Gordon, Andrić 5 Asts: Tomas 3	Report	Pts: Marić 14; Rebs: Roberts 14; Asts: Veselý 3	Arena: Arena Zagreb; Attendance: 16,200; Referees: Sašo Pukl (SLO), Matej Boltauzer (SLO), Damir Javor (SLO)

== Kup Radivoja Koraća ==
Quarterfinals

18 February 2010	Partizan Belgrade	75–57	Radnički Basket	Niš
18:00 CET	Scoring by quarter: 24–11, 13–19, 19–10, 19–17
	Pts: Roberts 11; Rebs: Vraneš 12	Report	Pts: Marković 19; Rebs: Ivan Smiljanić 10	Arena: Čair Sports Center

Semifinals

20 February 2010	Partizan Belgrade	69–64	Hemofarm STADA	Niš
18:00 CET	Scoring by quarter: 13–24, 19–24, 21–6, 16–10
	Pts: McCalebb 22; Rebs: Roberts 11	Report	Pts: Mačvan, Marković 15; Rebs: Marković 5	Arena: Čair Sports Center; Attendance: 5,000

Final

21 February 2010	Partizan Belgrade	72–62	FMP	Niš
20:00 CET	Scoring by quarter: 18–16, 16–15, 16–18, 22–13
	Pts: McCalebb 16; Rebs: Marić 7	Report	Pts: Raduljica 18; Rebs: Samardžiski 9	Arena: Čair Sports Center; Attendance: 4,000; Referees: Ilija Belošević, Milivoje Jovčić, Dragan Nešković

== Euroleague ==
=== Regular season ===
==== Group B ====
	Team	Pld	W	L	PF	PA	Diff
1.	(Greece) Olympiacos	10	8	2	884	787	+97
2.	(Spain) Unicaja Málaga	10	7	3	784	775	+9
3.	(Serbia) Partizan	10	5	5	745	757	−12
4.	(Turkey) Efes Pilsen	10	4	6	808	793	+15
5.	(Lithuania) Lietuvos Rytas	10	4	6	741	784	−43
6.	(France) Orléans	10	2	8	722	788	−66

Win Loss

22 October 2009 1	Partizan Belgrade (Serbia)	64–72	(Spain) Unicaja Málaga	Belgrade
20:45	Scoring by quarter: 25–19, 16–13, 11–17, 12–23
	Pts: McCalebb 15; Rebs: Marić 6 Asts: McCalebb 5	Report	Pts: Freeland 19; Rebs: Jiménez, Freeland, Blanco 4 Asts: Cook 6	Arena: Pionir Hall; Attendance: 6,173; Referees: Leonidas Spiridonos (GRE), Tolga Sahin(TUR), Marius Ciulin (ROU)

29 October 2009 2	Efes Pilsen (Turkey)	77–67	(Serbia) Partizan Belgrade	Istanbul
19:15	Scoring by quarter: 15–15, 20–22, 22–16, 20–14
	Pts: Smith 18; Rebs: Peker 8 Asts: Tunçeri, Arslan 5	Report	Pts: Marić 19; Rebs: Vraneš 7 Asts: McCalebb 7	Arena: Abdi İpekçi Arena; Attendance: 8,000; Referees: José Martín (ESP), Costas Mouzakis (GRE), Paolo Taurino (ITA)

5 November 2009 3	Partizan Belgrade (Serbia)	78–71	(France) Entente Orléans Loiret	Belgrade
20:45	Scoring by quarter: 22–22, 23–18, 17–20, 16–11
	Pts: Marić 18; Rebs: Marić 9 Asts: McCalebb 4	Report	Pts: Doellman 16; Rebs: Doellman 8 Asts: Curti 5	Arena: Pionir Hall; Attendance: 5,038; Referees: Juan Carlos García González (ESP), Roberto Chiari (ITA), Sergey Mikhaylov (RUS)

12 November 2009 4	Lietuvos Rytas (Lithuania)	78–56	(Serbia) Partizan Belgrade	Vilnius
18:45	Scoring by quarter: 26–22, 18–17, 22–7, 12–10
	Pts: Gecevičius 19; Rebs: Borovnjak 5 Asts: Gecevičius, Popović 5	Report	Pts: Marić, McCalebb 16; Rebs: Marić 10; Asts: Rasic 4	Arena: Siemens Arena; Attendance: 8,500; Referees: Luigi Lamonica (ITA), Jakub Zamosjki (POL), Anna Cardus (ESP)

26 November 2009 5	Partizan Belgrade (Serbia)	86–80	(Greece) Olympiacos	Belgrade
20:45	Scoring by quarter: 19–19, 19–24, 22–18, 26–19
	Pts: Rašić 25; Rebs: Marić 15; Asts: Rašić 5	Report	Pts: Childress, Kleiza 18; Rebs: Childress 7 Asts: Halperin 4	Arena: Pionir Hall; Attendance: 6,852; Referees: Shmuel Bachar (ISR), Guerrino Cerebuch (ITA), Antonio Conde (ESP)

2 December 2009 6	Unicaja Málaga (Spain)	64–72	(Serbia) Partizan Belgrade	Málaga
20:45	Scoring by quarter: 18–21, 11–11, 15–17, 20–23
	Pts: Freeland 12; Rebs: Lewis 7 Asts: Williams 4	Report	Pts: Kecman 16; Rebs: Roberts 12; Asts: McCalebb 5	Arena: Jose Maria Martin Carpena Arena; Attendance: 7,000; Referees: Fabio Facchini (ITA), Robert Vyklicky (CZE), Murat Biricik (TUR)

10 December 2009 7	Partizan Belgrade (Serbia)	93–92	(Turkey) Efes Pilsen	Belgrade
20:45	Scoring by quarter: 19–20, 27–28, 25–24, 22–20
	Pts: Marić 34; Rebs: Marić 16; Asts: Kecman 6	Report	Pts: Rakočević 24; Rebs: Peker 7 Asts: Rakočević, Tunçeri 3	Arena: Pionir Hall; Attendance: 7,022; Referees: Dani Hierrezuelo (ESP), Vicente Bulto (ESP), Marek Ćmikiewicz (POL)

17 December 2009 8	Entente Orléans Loiret (France)	75–72	(Serbia) Partizan Belgrade	Orléans
21:00	Scoring by quarter: 20–27, 19–7, 18–15, 18–23
	Pts: Banks 19; Rebs: Moerman 7 Asts: Banks 7	Report	Pts: Marić 20; Rebs: Marić 11; Asts: McCalebb 4	Arena: Palais des Sports; Attendance: 2,009; Referees: Lazaros Voreadis (GRE), Tomas Jasevicius (LTU), Oscar Perea (ESP)

6 January 2010 9	Partizan Belgrade (Serbia)	97–67	(Lithuania) Lietuvos Rytas	Belgrade
20:45	Scoring by quarter: 26–18, 24–21, 22–22, 25–6
	Pts: Rašić 26; Rebs: Vraneš 9 Asts: McCalebb 4	Report	Pts: Popović 17; Rebs: Bjelica 6 Asts: Popović 4	Arena: Pionir Hall; Attendance: 6,828; Referees: Luigi Lamonica(ITA), David Chambon (FRA), Panagiotis Anastopoulos (GRE)

13 January 2010 10	Olympiacos (Greece)	81–60	(Serbia) Partizan Belgrade	Piraeus
20:00	Scoring by quarter: 20–15, 16–18, 27–16, 18–11
	Pts: Kleiza 16; Rebs: Vujčić 6 Asts: Teodosić 9	Report	Pts: Roberts, McCalebb 14; Rebs: Veselý, Vraneš 7 Asts: McCalebb 3	Arena: Peace and Friendship Stadium; Attendance: 6,200; Referees: Juan Carlos Mitjana (ESP), Juan Carlos García González (ESP), Roberto Chiari (ITA)

=== Top 16 ===
	Team	Pld	W	L	PF	PA	Diff	Tie-break
1.	(Spain) Regal FC Barcelona	6	5	1	465	396	+69	
2.	(Serbia) Partizan Belgrade	6	3	3	389	422	−33	
3.	(Greece) Panathinaikos Athens	6	2	4	439	442	−3	1–1, +1
4.	(Greece) Maroussi Athens	6	2	4	419	452	−33	1–1, –1

Win Loss

27 January 2010 1	Panathinaikos (Greece)	59–64	(Serbia) Partizan Belgrade	Athens
20:00	Scoring by quarter: 22–20, 20–16, 10–10, 7–18
	Pts: Spanoulis 14; Rebs: Fotsis, Peković 6 Asts: Spanoulis 5	Report	Pts: Veselý 13; Rebs: Roberts 10; Asts: Veselý, McCalebb 4	Arena: Olympic Indoor Hall; Attendance: 11,800; Referees: Grzegorz Ziemblicki (POL), Tolga Sahin (TUR), Robert Vyklicky (CZE)

3 February 2010 2	Partizan Belgrade (Serbia)	67–66(OT)	(Spain) FC Barcelona	Belgrade
20:45	Scoring by quarter: 23–12, 12–12, 8–23, 18–4, Overtime: 6–5
	Pts: Veselý 13; Rebs: Veselý 15; Asts: Rašić 6	Report	Pts: Lakovič 14; Rebs: Basile 6 Asts: Rubio 5	Arena: Pionir Hall; Attendance: 8,125; Referees: Luigi Lamonica (ITA), Jakub Zamojski (POL), Sergey Mikhaylov (RUS)

11 February 2010 3	Maroussi (Greece)	57–49	(Serbia) Partizan Belgrade	Athens
18:45	Scoring by quarter: 20–7, 2–11, 22–19, 13–12
	Pts: Lucas 15; Rebs: Homan 9 Asts: Keys, Lucas 4	Report	Pts: Vraneš 12; Rebs: Vraneš 11; Asts: Roberts 3	Arena: Olympic Indoor Hall; Attendance: 3,000; Referees: José Ramón García Ortez (ESP), Sasa Pukl (SLO), Luís Lopes (POR)

25 February 2010 4	Partizan Belgrade (Serbia)	79–76	(Greece) Maroussi	Belgrade
20:45	Scoring by quarter: 21–24, 19–21, 18–11, 21–20
	Pts: McCalebb 20; Rebs: Roberts 9 Asts: McCalebb 4	Report	Pts: Pelekanos 19; Rebs: Pelekanos, Homan 6 Asts: Keys, Gordon 5	Arena: Pionir Hall; Attendance: 7,718; Referees: Carl Ungebrand (FIN), Nicola Maestre (FRA), Gianluca Mattioli (ITA)

4 March 2010 5	Partizan Belgrade (Serbia)	66–82	(Greece) Panathinaikos	Belgrade
20:45	Scoring by quarter: 19–19, 13–16, 18–25, 16–22
	Pts: McCalebb 22; Rebs: Marić 12; Asts: McCalebb 3	Report	Pts: Nicholas 22; Rebs: Batiste 5 Asts: Diamantidis 4	Arena: Pionir Hall; Attendance: 8,150; Referees: Fabio Facchini (ITA), Recep Ankaralı (TUR), Robert Vyklicky (CZE)

11 March 2010 6	FC Barcelona (Spain)	82–64	(Serbia) Partizan Belgrade	Barcelona
20:45	Scoring by quarter: 22–16, 14–14, 25–12, 21–22
	Pts: Navarro 18; Rebs: Mickeal 7 Asts: Rubio 6	Report	Pts: Roberts 14; Rebs: Marić 14; Asts: Rašić 5	Arena: Palau Blaugrana; Attendance: 6,953; Referees: Christos Christodoulou (GRE), Robert Lottermoser (GER), Panagiotis Anastopoulos (GRE)

==== Quarterfinals ====
Win Loss

23 March 2010 Quarterfinals game 1	Maccabi Electra Tel Aviv (Israel)	77–85 (Series: 0–1)	(Serbia) Partizan Belgrade	Tel Aviv
20:00	Scoring by quarter: 27–12, 19–20, 20–26, 11–27
	Pts: Perkins 13; Rebs: Fischer 7 Asts: Perkins 6	Report	Pts: Kecman 29; Rebs: McCalebb 10; Asts: McCalebb 6	Arena: Nokia Arena; Attendance: 11,500; Referees: José Martín (ESP), Borys Ryzhyk (UKR), Recep Ankaralı (TUR)

25 March 2010 Quarterfinals game 2	Maccabi Electra Tel Aviv (Israel)	98–78 (Series: 1–1)	(Serbia) Partizan Belgrade	Tel Aviv
20:00	Scoring by quarter: 26–24, 28–15, 19-19, 25–20
	Pts: Wisniewski, Bluthenthal 17; Rebs: Fischer 6 Asts: Anderson 5	Report	Pts: Marić 16; Rebs: Roberts 7 Asts: McCalebb 5	Arena: Nokia Arena; Attendance: 11,500; Referees: Luigi Lamonica (ITA), Dubravko Muhvić (CRO), Elias Koromilas (GRE)

30 March 2010 Quarterfinals game 3	Partizan Belgrade (Serbia)	81–73 (Series: 2–1)	(Israel) Maccabi Electra Tel Aviv	Belgrade
20:45	Scoring by quarter: 26–17, 21–17, 17–16, 17–23
	Pts: McCalebb 18; Rebs: Roberts, McCalebb, Marić, Vraneš 7 Asts: Roberts 3	Report	Pts: Anderson 13; Rebs: Perkins, Eidson 7 Asts: Eidson 5	Arena: Kombank Arena; Attendance: 20,783; Referees: Fabio Facchini (ITA), Guerrino Cerebuch (ITA), Srđan Dožai (CRO)

1 April 2010 Quarterfinals game 4	Partizan Belgrade (Serbia)	76–67 (Series: 3–1)	(Israel) Maccabi Electra Tel Aviv	Belgrade
20:45	Scoring by quarter: 18–16, 20–19, 17–17, 21–15
	Pts: McCalebb 19; Rebs: Roberts 12; Asts: Kecman 4	Report	Pts: Wisniewski 15; Rebs: Perkins 8 Asts: Wisniewski, Anderson, Fischer 2	Arena: Kombank Arena; Attendance: 21,367; Referees: Juan Carlos Mitjana (ESP), Paolo Taurino (ITA), Marek Cmikiewicz (POL)

=== Final Four ===
Semifinals; May 7
(Spain) Regal FC Barcelona	64
(Russia) CSKA Moscow	54
(Serbia) Partizan Belgrade	80
(Greece) Olympiacos	83

Final; May 9
(Spain) Regal FC Barcelona	86
(Greece) Olympiacos	68
Third place
(Russia) CSKA Moscow	90
(Serbia) Partizan Belgrade	88

==== Semifinal ====
7 May 2010 Semifinal	Partizan Belgrade (Serbia)	80–83(OT)	(Greece) Olympiacos	Paris
21:00	Scoring by quarter: 17–15, 11–18, 24–19, 15-15, Overtime: 13–16
	Pts: McCalebb 21; Rebs: Marić 10; Asts: Roberts 5	Report	Pts: Kleiza 19; Rebs: Kleiza 11; Asts: Papaloukas 5	Arena: Palais Omnisports de Paris-Bercy; Attendance: 14,768; Referees: Shmuel Bachar (ISR), Fabio Facchini (ITA), Dani Hierrezuelo (ESP), Matej Boltauzer (SLO)

Starters:			Pts	Reb	Ast
PG	6	(United States) Bo McCalebb	21	0	4
SG	7	(Serbia) Dušan Kecman	11	1	0
PF	4	(United States) Lawrence Roberts	5	7	5
PF	24	(Czech Republic) Jan Veselý	13	10	4
C	33	(Montenegro) Slavko Vraneš	0	4	0
Reserves:					
SG	5	(Serbia) Stefan Sinovec	DNP		
SF	8	(Serbia) Strahinja Milošević	0	0	0
SG	10	(Serbia) Aleksandar Rašić	5	1	2
SG	19	(Serbia) Aleksandar Mitrović	0	0	0
PG	20	(Serbia) Petar Božić	8	0	1
C	21	(Australia) Aleks Marić	17	8	3
PF	31	(Serbia) Branislav Đekić	0	0	0
Head coach:
(Basketball Federation of Serbia) Duško Vujošević

==== Third-place playoff ====
9 May 2010 3rd place game	CSKA Moscow (Russia)	90–88(OT)	(Serbia) Partizan Belgrade	Paris
18:00	Scoring by quarter: 25–20, 22–24, 14–18, 17–16, Overtime: 12–10
	Pts: Langdon 32; Rebs: Khryapa 6 Asts: Holden, Šiškauskas 4	Report	Pts: Roberts 16; Rebs: Roberts 8 Asts: McCalebb 4	Arena: Palais Omnisports de Paris-Bercy; Attendance: 14,768; Referees: Fabio Facchini (ITA), Dani Hierrezuelo (ESP), Olegs Latisevs (LAT), Christos Christodoulou (GRE)

Starters:			Pts	Reb	Ast
PG	6	(United States) Bo McCalebb	12	3	4
SG	7	(Serbia) Dušan Kecman	15	5	3
PF	4	(United States) Lawrence Roberts	16	8	2
PF	24	(Czech Republic) Jan Veselý	12	6	2
C	33	(Montenegro) Slavko Vraneš	0	4	0
Reserves:					
SG	5	(Serbia) Stefan Sinovec	DNP		
SF	8	(Serbia) Strahinja Milošević	0	1	0
SG	10	(Serbia) Aleksandar Rašić	10	3	2
SG	19	(Serbia) Aleksandar Mitrović	0	0	0
PG	20	(Serbia) Petar Božić	6	0	2
C	21	(Australia) Aleks Marić	15	6	1
PF	31	(Serbia) Branislav Đekić	2	1	1
Head coach:
(Basketball Federation of Serbia) Duško Vujošević

== Individual awards ==
Euroleague

All-EuroLeague First Team

- (Australia) Aleks Marić

All-EuroLeague Second Team

- (United States) Bo McCalebb

Euroleague MVP of the Month

- (Australia) Aleks Marić, December

Euroleague Weekly MVPs

- (Australia) Aleks Marić - Regular season, Week 5
- (Australia) Aleks Marić - Regular season, Week 7
- (Australia) Aleks Marić - Regular season, Week 8
- (Serbia) Dušan Kecman - Playoffs, Game 1

Adriatic League

MVP of the Round

- (Australia) Aleks Marić – Round 4
- (Montenegro) Slavko Vraneš – Round 15

Radivoj Korać Cup

Finals MVP

- (Australia) Aleks Marić

Basketball League of Serbia

Finals MVP

- (United States) Bo McCalebb
