= 2010–11 KK Partizan season =

Partizan Belgrade
2010–11 season
- President: Predrag Danilović
- Head coach: Vlada Jovanović
- Basketball League of Serbia: Champion
- Radivoj Korać Cup: Champion
- Adriatic League: Champion
- Euroleague: TOP 16
- Highest home attendance: vs Montepaschi Siena (17,923)

In the 2010–11 season, Partizan Belgrade competed in the Basketball League of Serbia, the Radivoj Korać Cup, the Adriatic League and the Euroleague.

== Players ==
=== Current roster ===
KK Partizan roster
Players
Coaches

| Pos. | No. | Nat. | Name | Ht. | Wt. | Age |
|---|---|---|---|---|---|---|
| G | 5 | (United States) | Jerrells, Curtis | 1.85 m (6 ft 1 in) | 88 kg (194 lb) | 38 – 5 February 1987 |
| G | 7 | (Serbia) | Kecman, Dušan | 1.97 m (6 ft 6 in) | 93 kg (205 lb) | 48 – 6 November 1977 |
| G | 8 | (Slovenia) | Klobučar, Jaka | 1.98 m (6 ft 6 in) | 91 kg (201 lb) | 38 – 19 August 1987 |
| G | 10 | (Serbia) | Jaramaz, Nemanja | 2.01 m (6 ft 7 in) | 86 kg (190 lb) | 34 – 10 July 1991 |
| F | 11 | (Serbia) | Lučić, Vladimir | 2.02 m (6 ft 8 in) | 91 kg (201 lb) | 36 – 17 June 1989 |
| G | 12 | (Serbia) | Milosavljević, Dragan | 1.98 m (6 ft 6 in) | 91 kg (201 lb) | 36 – 11 May 1989 |
| G | 13 | (Serbia) | Bogdanović, Bogdan | 1.98 m (6 ft 6 in) | 93 kg (205 lb) | 33 – 18 August 1992 |
| C | 14 | (Serbia) | Katić, Raško | 2.08 m (6 ft 10 in) | 114 kg (251 lb) | 45 – 8 December 1980 |
| C | 15 | (Australia) | Jawai, Nathan | 2.09 m (6 ft 10 in) | 143 kg (315 lb) | 39 – 10 October 1986 |
| C | 18 | (Serbia) | Bešović, Nemanja | 2.19 m (7 ft 2 in) | 107 kg (236 lb) | 33 – 8 June 1992 |
| G | 20 | (Serbia) | Božić, Petar (C) | 1.97 m (6 ft 6 in) | 100 kg (220 lb) | 47 – 6 December 1978 |
| F | 21 | (United States) | Gist, James | 2.06 m (6 ft 9 in) | 107 kg (236 lb) | 39 – 26 October 1986 |
| C | 24 | (Czech Republic) | Veselý, Jan | 2.11 m (6 ft 11 in) | 110 kg (243 lb) | 35 – 24 April 1990 |
| F | 31 | (Serbia) | Đekić, Branislav | 2.07 m (6 ft 9 in) | 94 kg (207 lb) | 34 – 12 August 1991 |

Head coach

- (Serbia) Vlada Jovanović

Assistant coach(es)

- (Serbia) Milivoje Lazić
- (Serbia) Miloš Gligorijević
- (Serbia) Đorđe Šijan

Legend

- (C) Team captain
- Injured

- Roster
Updated: March 15, 2011

=== Depth chart ===
| Pos. | Starting 5 | Bench 1 | Bench 2 | Reserve |
|---|---|---|---|---|
| C | Nathan Jawai | Raško Katić | Nemanja Bešović |
| PF | Jan Veselý | James Gist | Branislav Đekić |
| SF | Vladimir Lučić | Jaka Klobučar |
| SG | Dušan Kecman | Dragan Milosavljević | Nemanja Jaramaz | Bogdan Bogdanović |
| PG | Curtis Jerrells | Petar Božić |

=== Roster changes ===
In

- (United States) Curtis Jerrells (from (United States) Austin Toros)
- (Slovenia) Jaka Klobučar (from (Slovenia) Union Olimpija)
- (Serbia) Nemanja Jaramaz (from (Serbia) Mega Vizura)
- (Serbia) Raško Katić (from (Serbia) Hemofarm)
- (United States) James Gist (from (Russia) Lokomotiv Kuban)
- (Australia) Nathan Jawai (from (United States) Minnesota Timberwolves)
- (Serbia) Dragan Milosavljević (from (Serbia) Radnički Kragujevac)
- (Serbia) Bogdan Bogdanović (from youth categories)
- (United States) Oliver Lafayette (from (United States) Boston Celtics)

Out

- (United States) Bo McCalebb (to (Italy) Montepaschi Siena)
- (United States) Lawrence Roberts (to (Turkey) Efes Pilsen)
- (Australia) Aleks Marić (to (Greece) Panathinaikos)
- (Serbia) Stefan Sinovec (to (Serbia) Metalac Valjevo)
- (Serbia) Sava Lešić (to (Serbia) Crvena zvezda)
- (Serbia) Strahinja Milošević (to (Serbia) Crvena zvezda)
- (Serbia) Aleksandar Rašić (to (Turkey) Trabzonspor)
- (Serbia) Darko Balaban (to (Serbia) Crvena zvezda)
- (Montenegro) Slavko Vraneš (to (Russia) UNICS Kazan)
- (United States) Oliver Lafayette (from (United States) Fort Wayne Mad Ants)

== Preseason and friendlies ==
| 1 September 2010 | Partizan Belgrade (Serbia) | 80–60 | (Serbia) OKK Beograd | Belgrade |
| | Scoring by quarter: 20–15, 15–17, 17–11, 28–17 |
| | Pts: Veselý 12 | | Pts: ? | Arena: Hala sportova |

| 6 September 2010 | Igokea (Bosnia and Herzegovina) | 78–83 | (Serbia) Partizan Belgrade | Banja Luka, Bosnia and Herzegovina |
| | Scoring by quarter: 21–17, 25–22, 15–20, 17–24 |
| | Pts: Pantić, Mirković 13 | | Pts: Popović 15 | Arena: Sportska dvorana Borik; Attendance: 4,000 |

| 8 September 2010 | Helios (Slovenia) | 78–68 | (Serbia) Partizan Belgrade | Domžale, Slovenia |
| | Scoring by quarter: 16–12, 23–13, 10–20, 29–23 |
| | Pts: Bubnić 20 | | Pts: Katić 21 |

| 10 September 2010 | Rogaška (Slovenia) | 71–91 | (Serbia) Partizan Belgrade | Rogaška Slatina, Slovenia |
| | Scoring by quarter: 12–31, 28–27, 11–16, 20–17 |
| | Pts: Spešić 15 | | Pts: Jawai 18 |

| 18 September 2010 | Partizan Belgrade (Serbia) | 83–70 | (Bosnia and Herzegovina) Igokea | Belgrade |
| | Scoring by quarter: 18–18, 25–21, 17–19, 23–12 |
| | Pts: Jawai 17 | | Pts: Harris 15 | Arena: Pionir Hall |

| 21 September 2010 | Partizan Belgrade (Serbia) | 79–66 | (Serbia) FMP | Belgrade |
| | Scoring by quarter: 25–18, 19–17, 18–14, 17–14 |
| | Pts: Lučić 18 | | Pts: Marković 12 | Arena: Pionir Hall |

| 23 September 2010 | Partizan Belgrade (Serbia) | 75–67 | (Croatia) Zadar | Belgrade |
| | Scoring by quarter: 21–18, 10–27, 17–6, 27–16 |
| | Pts: Veselý 18 | | Pts: Brown 16 | Arena: Pionir Hall |

| 26 September 2010 | Sloga (Serbia) | 78–105 | (Serbia) Partizan Belgrade | Kraljevo |
| | Scoring by quarter: 16–19, 16–33, 23–27, 23–26 |
| | Pts: Đorđević 14 | | Pts: Milosavljević 19 | Arena: Kraljevo Sports Hall; Attendance: 3,000 |

2010 Gomelsky Cup

| 2 October 2010 Semi-finals | CSKA Moscow (Russia) | 75–63 | (Serbia) Partizan Belgrade | Moscow, Russia |
| | Scoring by quarter: 17–15, 27–15, 15–24, 16–9 |
| | Pts: Langdon 14 | | Pts: Jawai 19 |

| 3 October 2010 3rd place game | Panathinaikos (Greece) | 73–68 | (Serbia) Partizan Belgrade | Moscow, Russia |
| | Scoring by quarter: 17–12, 19–18, 19–28, 18–10 |
| | Pts: Shermadini 18 | | Pts: Katić 18 |

== Competitions ==
| | Competition | Position | Record |
|---|---|---|---|
| (Serbia) | Basketball League of Serbia | Winners | 18–2 |
| (Serbia) | Radivoj Korać Cup | Winners | 3–0 |
| (European Union) | Adriatic League | Winners | 20–8 |
| (European Union) | Euroleague | TOP 16 | 6–10 |

== Adriatic League ==
=== Standings ===
| | Team | Pld | W | L | PF | PA | Diff | Pts |
|---|---|---|---|---|---|---|---|---|
| 1 | (Serbia) Partizan | 26 | 18 | 8 | 2074 | 1796 | 278 | 44 |
| 2 | (Slovenia) Union Olimpija | 26 | 17 | 9 | 2005 | 1881 | 124 | 43 |
| 3 | (Slovenia) Krka | 26 | 17 | 9 | 1996 | 1867 | 129 | 43 |
| 4 | (Montenegro) Budućnost m:tel | 26 | 15 | 11 | 2009 | 1927 | 82 | 41 |

=== Regular season ===
| 9 October 2010 1 | Partizan Belgrade (Serbia) | 78–79 | (Montenegro) Budućnost | Belgrade |
| | Scoring by quarter: 26–17, 12–17, 13–23, 27–22 |
| | Pts: Milosavljević 15 | Report | Pts: Dragićević 15 | Arena: Pionir Hall |

| 13 October 2010 2 | Partizan Belgrade (Serbia) | 77–66 | (Serbia) Hemofarm | Belgrade |
| | Scoring by quarter: 16–15, 27–17, 14–15, 20–19 |
| | Pts: Milosavljević 13 | Report | Pts: Mačvan 22 | Arena: Pionir Hall |

| 16 October 2010 3 | Široki (Bosnia and Herzegovina) | 86–79 | (Serbia) Partizan Belgrade | Široki Brijeg |
| | Scoring by quarter: 16–12, 25–23, 16–22, 29–22 |
| | Pts: Pilepić 17 | Report | Pts: Milosavljević 19 | Arena: Pecara |

| 24 October 2010 4 | Partizan Belgrade (Serbia) | 80–72 | (Croatia) Cedevita | Belgrade |
| | Scoring by quarter: 22–22, 19–18, 23–13, 15–18 |
| | Pts: Jawai 19 | Report | Pts: Edwards 27 | Arena: Pionir Hall |

| 31 October 2010 5 | Union Olimpija (Slovenia) | 75–73 | (Serbia) Partizan Belgrade | Ljubljana |
| | Scoring by quarter: 12–20, 14–17, 19–19, 30–17 |
| | Pts: Ilievski 18 | Report | Pts: Kecman 18 | Arena: Arena Stožice |

| 6 November 2010 6 | Partizan Belgrade (Serbia) | 84–64 | (Croatia) Zagreb CO | Belgrade |
| | Scoring by quarter: 13–17, 27–15, 21–22, 23–10 |
| | Pts: Jawai, Klobučar, Gist 12 | Report | Pts: Kasun 18 | Arena: Pionir Hall |

| 13 November 2010 7 | ČEZ Nymburk (Czech Republic) | 73–69 | (Serbia) Partizan Belgrade | Nymburk |
| | Scoring by quarter: 16–15, 21–20, 17–17, 19–17 |
| | Pts: Simmons 22 | Report | Pts: Jawai 14 | Arena: Sportovní Centrum |

| 21 November 2010 8 | Partizan Belgrade (Serbia) | 99–68 | (Serbia) Crvena zvezda | Belgrade |
| | Scoring by quarter: 20–20, 28–12, 28–19, 23–17 |
| | Pts: Lafayette 18 | Report | Pts: Marsh 16 | Arena: Pionir Hall |

| 27 November 2010 9 | Radnički (Serbia) | 89–85 | (Serbia) Partizan Belgrade | Kragujevac |
| | Scoring by quarter: 33–24, 21–10, 13–21, 22–20 |
| | Pts: Lee 24 | Report | Pts: Katić 17 | Arena: Jezero Hall |

| 5 December 2010 10 | Partizan Belgrade (Serbia) | 77–72 | (Bosnia and Herzegovina) Igokea | Belgrade |
| | Scoring by quarter: 22–12, 18–19, 20–18, 18–23 |
| | Pts: Jawai 17 | Report | Pts: Chase 18 | Arena: Pionir Hall |

| 12 December 2010 11 | Zadar (Croatia) | 91–88 | (Serbia) Partizan Belgrade | Zadar |
| | Scoring by quarter: 34–22, 21–14, 14–19, 22–33 |
| | Pts: Car 27 | Report | Pts: Gist 21 | Arena: Krešimir Ćosić Hall |

| 18 December 2010 12 | Partizan Belgrade (Serbia) | 75–50 | (Slovenia) Krka | Belgrade |
| | Scoring by quarter: 25–10, 12–15, 24–17, 14–8 |
| | Pts: Katić 16 | Report | Pts: Ikonić 14 | Arena: Pionir Hall |

| 28 December 2010 13 | Cibona (Croatia) | 55–85 | (Serbia) Partizan Belgrade | Zagreb |
| | Scoring by quarter: 8–16, 19–30, 18–20, 10–19 |
| | Pts: Giriček, Zubčić 13 | Report | Pts: Gist 24 | Arena: Dražen Petrović Basketball Hall |

| 7 January 2011 14 | Budućnost (Montenegro) | 61–65 | (Serbia) Partizan Belgrade | Podgorica |
| | Scoring by quarter: 24–6, 12–21, 11–15, 14–23 |
| | Pts: Šćekić 15 | Report | Pts: Veselý, Jerrells 12 | Arena: Morača Sports Center |

| 10 January 2011 15 | Hemofarm (Serbia) | 64–71 | (Serbia) Partizan Belgrade | Vršac |
| | Scoring by quarter: 24–16, 11–12, 13–21, 16–22 |
| | Pts: Borisov 17 | Report | Pts: Jawai 14 | Arena: Millennium Centar |

| 13 January 2011 16 | Partizan Belgrade (Serbia) | 93–43 | (Bosnia and Herzegovina) Široki | Belgrade |
| | Scoring by quarter: 27–13, 24–9, 22–11, 20–10 |
| | Pts: Klobučar 16 | Report | Pts: Špralja 23 | Arena: Pionir Hall |

| 16 January 2011 17 | Cedevita (Croatia) | 88–84 | (Serbia) Partizan Belgrade | Zagreb |
| | Scoring by quarter: 23–15, 25–24, 19–15, 22–30 |
| | Pts: Draper 23 | Report | Pts: Jawai 18 | Arena: Dom Sportova |

| 22 January 2011 18 | Partizan Belgrade (Serbia) | 61–50 | (Slovenia) Union Olimpija | Belgrade |
| | Scoring by quarter: 19–5, 14–13, 16'–17, 12–15 |
| | Pts: Gist 21 | Report | Pts: Ilievski 16 | Arena: Pionir Hall |

| 30 January 2011 19 | Zagreb CO (Croatia) | 69–77 | (Serbia) Partizan Belgrade | Zagreb |
| | Scoring by quarter: 20–18, 21–17, 15–19, 11–23 |
| | Pts: Žorić 30 | Report | Pts: Jerrells, Katić 14 | Arena: Dražen Petrović Basketball Hall |

| 6 February 2011 20 | Partizan Belgrade (Serbia) | 86–75 | (Czech Republic) ČEZ Nymburk | Belgrade |
| | Scoring by quarter: 21–13, 24–21, 22–18, 19–23 |
| | Pts: Jerrells 19 | Report | Pts: Pumprla 19 | Arena: Pionir Hall |

| 20 February 2011 21 | Crvena zvezda (Serbia) | 68–76 | (Serbia) Partizan Belgrade | Belgrade |
| | Scoring by quarter: 17–20, 20–16, 9–21, 22–19 |
| | Pts: Marsh 27 | Report | Pts: Veselý 15 | Arena: Pionir Hall |

| 27 February 2011 22 | Partizan Belgrade (Serbia) | 80–64 | (Serbia) Radnički | Belgrade |
| | Scoring by quarter: 23–17, 17–22, 20–15, 20–10 |
| | Pts: Veselý 17 | Report | Pts: Lee 24 | Arena: Pionir Hall |

| 6 March 2011 23 | Igokea (Bosnia and Herzegovina) | 88–86 | (Serbia) Partizan Belgrade | Laktaši |
| | Scoring by quarter: 18–18, 25–19, 23–16, 22–33 |
| | Pts: Vitkovac 15 | Report | Pts: Jerrells 24 | Arena: Laktaši Sports Hall |

| 9 March 2011 24 | Partizan Belgrade (Serbia) | 85–50 | (Croatia) Zadar | Belgrade |
| | Scoring by quarter: 14–13, 29–12, 23–11, 19–14 |
| | Pts: Veselý 15 | Report | Pts: Car 19 | Arena: Pionir Hall |

| 12 March 2011 25 | Krka (Slovenia) | 62–72 | (Serbia) Partizan Belgrade | Novo Mesto |
| | Scoring by quarter: 16–26, 17–12, 14–17, 15–17 |
| | Pts: Booker 16 | Report | Pts: Jerrells 18 | Arena: Leon Štukelj Hall |

| 15 March 2011 26 | Partizan Belgrade (Serbia) | 89–74 | (Croatia) Cibona | Belgrade |
| | Scoring by quarter: 22–18, 22–17, 20–21, 25–17 |
| | Pts: Veselý 21 | Report | Pts: Bogdanović 23 | Arena: Pionir Hall |

=== Final four ===
Semifinals; 19 April
1 | (Serbia) Partizan Belgrade | 62
4 | (Montenegro) Budućnost m:tel | 58
2 | (Slovenia) Union Olimpija | 67
3 | (Slovenia) Krka | 57

Final; 21 April
1 | (Slovenia) Union Olimpija | 74
2 | (Serbia) Partizan Belgrade | 77

==== Semifinals ====
| 19 April 2011 | Partizan Belgrade (Serbia) | 62–58 | (Montenegro) Budućnost | Ljubljana |
| 18:15 | Scoring by quarter: 14–16, 16–13, 7–16, 25–13 |
| | Pts: Jerrells, Katić 13; Rebs: Gist 6 Asts: Gist 2 | Report | Pts: Simonović 14; Rebs: Simonović 8 Asts: Kadžiulis 3 | Arena: Arena Stožice; Attendance: 4,000; Referees: Dubravko Muhvić (CRO), Sašo Pukl (SLO), Matej Boltauzer (SLO) |

==== Final ====
| 21 April 2011 | Union Olimpija (Slovenia) | 74–77 | (Serbia) Partizan Belgrade | Ljubljana |
| 20:45 | Scoring by quarter: 23–26, 16–17, 19–22, 16–12 |
| | Pts: Ilievski 15; Rebs: Jagodnik 7 Asts: Ožbolt, Ilievski 3 | Report | Pts: Jerrells 20; Rebs: Jawai, Veselý 6 Asts: Lučić, Kecman 2 | Arena: Arena Stožice; Attendance: 12,000; Referees: Srđan Dožai (CRO), Sreten Radović (CRO), Siniša Herceg (CRO) |

== Euroleague ==
=== Regular season ===
==== Group B ====
| | Team | Pld | W | L | PF | PA | Diff | Tie-break |
|---|---|---|---|---|---|---|---|---|
| 1. | (Israel) Maccabi Tel Aviv | 10 | 9 | 1 | 799 | 700 | +99 | |
| 2. | (Spain) Caja Laboral | 10 | 5 | 5 | 809 | 784 | +25 | 2–2 +15 |
| 3. | (Lithuania) Žalgiris | 10 | 5 | 5 | 762 | 765 | −3 | 2–2 +3 |
| 4. | (Serbia) Partizan Belgrade | 10 | 5 | 5 | 658 | 717 | −59 | 2–2 −18 |
| 5. | (Russia) Khimki | 10 | 4 | 6 | 764 | 753 | +11 | |
| 6. | (Poland) Asseco Prokom | 10 | 2 | 8 | 689 | 762 | −73 | |

Win Loss

| 21 October 2010 | Žalgiris (Lithuania) | 73–62 | (Serbia) Partizan Belgrade | Kaunas |
| 18:45 | Scoring by quarter: 19–17, 24–12, 19–16, 11–17 |
| | Pts: Pocius 17; Rebs: Jankūnas 7 Asts: Pocius 3 | Report | Pts: Kecman 13; Rebs: Kecman, Lešić 6 Asts: four players 2 | Arena: Kaunas Sports Hall; Attendance: 5,000; Referees: Volodymr Drabikovsky (UKR), Sergey Mikhaylov (RUS), Apostolos Kalpakas (SWE) |

| 27 October 2010 | Partizan Belgrade (Serbia) | 72–68 | (Russia) Khimki | Belgrade |
| 20:45 | Scoring by quarter: 21–19, 15–18, 13–16, 23–15 |
| | Pts: Jawai 15; Rebs: Jawai 8 Asts: Lafayette 4 | Report | Pts: Langford 19; Rebs: Lončar 9 Asts: Langford, Planinić 2 | Arena: Hala Pionir; Attendance: 7,035; Referees: Christos Christodoulou (GRE), Eddie Viator(FRA), Oscar Perea(ESP) |

| 4 November 2010 | Partizan Belgrade (Serbia) | 54–67 | (Israel) Maccabi Tel Aviv | Belgrade |
| 20:45 | Scoring by quarter: 10–23, 12–8, 15–20, 17–16 |
| | Pts: Lafayette 11; Rebs: Gist 6 Asts: Lučić 3 | Report | Pts: Pargo 17; Rebs: Perkins, Schortsanitis 8 Asts: Perkins, Eidson 4 | Arena: Hala Pionir; Attendance: 7,570; Referees: Juan Carlos Artega (ESP), Roberto Chiari (ITA), Panagiotis Anastopoulos (GRE) |

| 10 November 2010 | Asseco Prokom (Poland) | 62–69 | (Serbia) Partizan Belgrade | Gdynia |
| 19:45 | Scoring by quarter: 18–20, 18–19, 15–13, 11–17 |
| | Pts: Brown 16; Rebs: Jagla 6 Asts: Ewing 3 | Report | Pts: Gist 16; Rebs: Three players 6 Asts: Lafayette 6 | Arena: Gdynia Sports Arena; Attendance: 4,654; Referees: Luigi Lamonica [ITA], Vicente Bulto [ESP], Regis Bardera [FRA] |

| 17 November 2010 | Partizan Belgrade (Serbia) | 74–71 | (Spain) Caja Laboral | Belgrade |
| 19:45 | Scoring by quarter: 18–25, 24–13, 14–18, 18–15 |
| | Pts: Gist 14; Rebs: Gist 11; Asts: Lafayette, Kecman 4 | Report | Pts: Barać 17; Rebs: Barać 6 Asts: Huertas, Logan 5 | Arena: Hala Pionir; Attendance: 7,620; Referees: Volodymr Drabikovsky [UKR], Fernando Rocha [POR], Borys Ryzhnyk [UKR] |

| 25 November 2010 | Partizan Belgrade (Serbia) | 68–62 | (Lithuania) Žalgiris | Belgrade |
| 20:45 | Scoring by quarter: 23–14, 21–15, 10–14, 14–19 |
| | Pts: Milosavljević 19; Rebs: Gist 8 Asts: Božić, Gist 4 | Report | Pts: Begić 19; Rebs: Jankūnas 11; Asts: Delininkaitis 4 | Arena: Hala Pionir; Attendance: 7,800; Referees: Carl Jungebrand (FIN), Elias Koromilas (GRE), Miguel Angel Perez Niz (ESP) |

| 1 December 2010 | Khimki (Russia) | 92–65 | (Serbia) Partizan Belgrade | Moscow |
| 16:15 | Scoring by quarter: 26–13, 24–24, 19–14, 23–14 |
| | Pts: Langford 22; Rebs: Langford 6 Asts: Langford, Planinić 3 | Report | Pts: Gist 18; Rebs: Gist 5 Asts: Milosavljević 2 | Arena: Basketball Center of Moscow Region; Attendance: 3,000; Referees: Jose Ramon Garcia Ortiz [ESP], Spiros Gkontas [GRE], Olegs Latisevs [LAT] |

| 9 December 2010 | Maccabi Tel Aviv (Israel) | 76–62 | (Serbia) Partizan Belgrade | Tel Aviv |
| 20:00 | Scoring by quarter: 23–11, 19–13, 18–16, 16–22 |
| | Pts: Eliyahu 16; Rebs: Eidson 9 Asts: Eidson 4 | Report | Pts: Gist 14; Rebs: Jawai 7 Asts: Jerrells 4 | Arena: Yad Eliyahu Arena; Attendance: 11,500; Referees: Juan Carlos Mitjana (ESP), Sradan Dozai (CRO), Rustu Nuran (TUR) |

| 15 December 2010 | Partizan Belgrade (Serbia) | 61–59 | (Poland) Asseco Prokom | Belgrade |
| 20:45 | Scoring by quarter: 15–8, 12–18, 12–15, 22–18 |
| | Pts: Katić 14; Rebs: Gist, Katić 7 Asts: Jerrells 4 | Report | Pts: Ewing, Varda 15; Rebs: Jagla 7 Asts: Ewing 5 | Arena: Hala Pionir; Attendance: 7,800; Referees: Fabio Facchini [ITA], Paolo Taurino [ITA], Oliver Krause [GER] |

| 23 December 2010 | Caja Laboral (Spain) | 87–71 | (Serbia) Partizan Belgrade | Vitoria-Gasteiz |
| 20:45 | Scoring by quarter: 21–16, 20–14, 28–19, 18–22 |
| | Pts: Teletović 17; Rebs: Oleson 7 Asts: Huertas 5 | Report | Pts: Veselý 17; Rebs: Gist 10; Asts: Jerrells, Gist 3 | Arena: Fernando Buesa Arena; Attendance: 9,500; Referees: Recep Ankarali (TUR), Eddie Viator (FRA), Damir Javor (SLO) |

=== Top 16 ===
| | Team | Pld | W | L | PF | PA | Diff | Tie-break |
|---|---|---|---|---|---|---|---|---|
| 1. | (Spain) Real Madrid | 6 | 5 | 1 | 460 | 423 | +37 | |
| 2. | (Italy) Montepaschi Siena | 6 | 4 | 2 | 452 | 423 | +29 | |
| 3. | (Turkey) Efes Pilsen | 6 | 2 | 4 | 426 | 455 | −29 | |
| 4. | (Serbia) Partizan Belgrade | 6 | 1 | 5 | 389 | 426 | −37 | |

| 19 January 2011 | Real Madrid (Spain) | 78–58 | (Serbia) Partizan Belgrade | Madrid |
| 20:45 | Scoring by quarter: 17–18, 26–9, 15–13, 20–18 |
| | Pts: Llull 21; Rebs: Veličković 12; Asts: Llull 4 | Report | Pts: Jerrells, Jawai 12; Rebs: Gist 9 Asts: Jerrells 4 | Arena: Caja Mágica; Attendance: 5,097; Referees: Volodymr Drabikovsky (UKR), Robert Lottermoser (GER), Elias Koromilas (GRE) |

| 26 January 2011 | Partizan Belgrade (Serbia) | 76–79 | (Turkey) Efes Pilsen | Belgrade |
| 20:45 | Scoring by quarter: 21–19, 13–21, 18–19, 24–20 |
| | Pts: Gist 19; Rebs: Three players 6 Asts: Jerrells 7 | Report | Pts: Rakočević 23; Rebs: Roberts 5 Asts: Three players 3 | Arena: Belgrade Arena; Attendance: 17,893; Referees: Juan Carlos Arteaga (ESP), Marek Cmikiewicz (POL), Carmelo Paternico (ITA) |

| 3 February 2011 | Partizan Belgrade (Serbia) | 58–66 | (Italy) Montepaschi Siena | Belgrade |
| 20:45 | Scoring by quarter: 15–19, 11–12, 15–19, 17–16 |
| | Pts: Gist 15; Rebs: Gist 7 Asts: Jerrells 3 | Report | Pts: Michelori 15; Rebs: Raković, Stonerook 7 Asts: Zisis, Stonerook 3 | Arena: Belgrade Arena; Attendance: 17,923; Referees: Jose Martín (ESP), Borys Ryzhyk (UKR), Juan Carlos García González (ESP) |

| 16 February 2011 | Montepaschi Siena (Italy) | 77–74 | (Serbia) Partizan Belgrade | Siena |
| 20:45 | Scoring by quarter: 12–20, 26–17, 15–16, 24–21 |
| | Pts: Kaukėnas 17; Rebs: Zisis 6 Asts: Moss 4 | Report | Pts: Veselý 17; Rebs: Katić 12; Asts: Jerrells 5 | Arena: Palasport Mens Sana; Attendance: 4,822; Referees: Jose Ramón García Ortiz (ESP), David Chambon (FRA), Tomas Jasevičius (LTU) |

| 24 February 2011 | Partizan Belgrade (Serbia) | 56–61 | (Spain) Real Madrid | Belgrade |
| 20:45 | Scoring by quarter: 12–15, 6–18, 18–11, 20–17 |
| | Pts: Veselý 15; Rebs: Katić, Gist 8 Asts: Gist 2 | Report | Pts: Tomić 21; Rebs: Mirotić 9 Asts: Prigioni 6 | Arena: Belgrade Arena; Attendance: 16,525; Referees: Fabio Facchini (ITA), Recep Ankaralı (TUR), Luís Lopes (POR) |

| 3 March 2011 | Efes Pilsen (Turkey) | 65–67 | (Serbia) Partizan Belgrade | Istanbul |
| 19:45 | Scoring by quarter: 12–21, 22–16, 13–12, 18–18 |
| | Pts: Rakočević 19; Rebs: Thornton, Gönlüm 8 Asts: Tunçeri, Gönlüm 3 | Report | Pts: Veselý 23; Rebs: Katić 8 Asts: Jerrells 7 | Arena: Sinan Erdem Dome; Attendance: 3,750; Referees: Dani Hierruzuelo (ESP), Nicola Maestre (FRA), Spiros Gkontas (GRE) |

== Individual awards ==
Adriatic League

ABA League Finals MVP

- (Australia) Nathan Jawai

Radivoj Korać Cup

Finals MVP

- (United States) James Gist

Basketball League of Serbia

Finals MVP

- (United States) Curtis Jerrells
