= Eurocup Basketball 2012–13 Regular Season Group E =

Standings and Results for Group E of the Regular Season phase of the 2012–13 Eurocup basketball tournament.

== Standings ==
All times are CET (UTC+1).

Key to colors
Top two teams advance to Last 16

	Team	Pld	W	L	PF	PA	Diff	Tie-break
1.	(Russia) PBC Lokomotiv-Kuban	6	4	2	471	437	+34	1–1 (+1)
2.	(Turkey) Galatasaray Medical Park	6	4	2	492	446	+46	1–1 (–1)
3.	(Ukraine) BC Donetsk	6	3	3	461	459	+2	
4.	(Poland) Trefl Sopot	6	1	5	460	542	–82	

=== Game 1 ===
7 November 2012
18:00

Report

BC Donetsk (Ukraine)	75–78	(Russia) PBC Lokomotiv-Kuban
Scoring by quarter: 17–25, 19–15, 20–18, 19–20
Pts: Curry 23; Rebs: Lukashov, Curry, Songaila 5 Asts: Stojanovski 3		Pts: Kalnietis 17; Rebs: Calathes 6 Asts: Kalnietis 8

Druzhba Palace of Sports, Donetsk
Attendance: 2,800
Referees: Murat Biricik (TUR), Radomir Vojinovic (MNE), Erşan Kartal (TUR)

7 November 2012
20:00

Report

Trefl Sopot (Poland)	65–94	(Turkey) Galatasaray Medical Park
Scoring by quarter: 8–23, 28–24, 15–21, 14–26
Pts: Dylewicz 14; Rebs: Waczyński 11; Asts: Waczyński 5		Pts: N'Dong 14; Rebs: Aldemir 8 Asts: Gordon, Mačvan, Arslan 2

Ergo Arena, Gdańsk/Sopot
Attendance: 4,200
Referees: Tomas Jasevicius (LTU), Sergiy Chebyshev (UKR), Aleksandar Milojevic (MKD)

=== Game 2 ===
14 November 2012
16:30

Report

PBC Lokomotiv-Kuban (Russia)	99–79	(Poland) Trefl Sopot
Scoring by quarter: 27–22, 22–17, 16–17, 34–23
Pts: Baron 29; Rebs: Marić 14; Asts: Calathes 6		Pts: Turner 15; Rebs: Dąbrowski 6 Asts: Turner 4

Basket Hall, Krasnodar
Attendance: 1,800
Referees: Andrej Jersan (SLO), Miroslav Tomov (BUL), Marko Juras (SRB)

14 November 2012
19:15

Report

Galatasaray Medical Park (Turkey)	72–68	(Ukraine) BC Donetsk
Scoring by quarter: 14–18, 25–15, 17–14, 16–21
Pts: Hawkins 22; Rebs: Gordon 8 Asts: Arslan 4		Pts: Curry 17; Rebs: Ivanov 9 Asts: Stojanovski 3

Abdi İpekçi Arena, Istanbul
Attendance: 4,940
Referees: Matej Boltauzer (SLO), Zdravko Rutesic (MNE), Saso Petek (SLO)

=== Game 3 ===
21 November 2012
16:30

Report

PBC Lokomotiv-Kuban (Russia)	91–66	(Turkey) Galatasaray Medical Park
Scoring by quarter: 21–17, 25–19, 26–12, 19–18
Pts: Baron 23; Rebs: Marić, Calathes 6 Asts: Calathes 10		Pts: Gordon 12; Rebs: N'Dong 5 Asts: Hawkins 5

Basket Hall, Krasnodar
Attendance: 6,000
Referees: Milija Vojinovic (SRB), Panagiotis Anastopoulos (GRE), Arnis Ozols (LAT)

21 November 2012
18:00

Report

BC Donetsk (Ukraine)	92–87 (OT)	(Poland) Trefl Sopot
Scoring by quarter: 14–20, 20–10, 22–27, 19–18, Overtime: 17–12
Pts: Songaila 24; Rebs: Fischer, Songaila 7 Asts: Perkins 7		Pts: Turner 23; Rebs: Stefanski 8 Asts: Turner 6

Druzhba Palace of Sports, Donetsk
Attendance: 3,900
Referees: Emin Mogulkoc (TUR), Ingus Bauminas (LAT), Petros Papapetrou (GRE)

=== Game 4 ===
28 November 2012
19:00

Report

Trefl Sopot (Poland)	77–67	(Ukraine) BC Donetsk
Scoring by quarter: 20–17, 14–28, 19–13, 24–9
Pts: Dylewicz 20; Rebs: Dąbrowski 4 Asts: Dylewicz 3		Pts: Stojanovski 15; Rebs: Lukashov, Songaila, Radenović 5 Asts: Lukashov, Lipovy 3

Ergo Arena, Gdańsk/Sopot
Attendance: 2,800
Referees: Andrej Lovsyn (SLO), Oskars Lucis (LAT), Tomislav Vovk (CRO)

28 November 2012
19:15

Report

Galatasaray Medical Park (Turkey)	76–52	(Russia) PBC Lokomotiv-Kuban
Scoring by quarter: 21–12, 21–13, 20–15, 14–12
Pts: Hawkins 14; Rebs: N'Dong 12; Asts: Gordon, Hawkins 4		Pts: Calathes 19; Rebs: Marić 7 Asts: Calathes 6

Abdi İpekçi Arena, Istanbul
Attendance: 6,249
Referees: Paolo Taurino (ITA), Joseph Bissang (FRA), Jasmina Juras (SRB)

=== Game 5 ===
4 December 2012
19:30

Report

Galatasaray Medical Park (Turkey)	103–82	(Poland) Trefl Sopot
Scoring by quarter: 25–21, 31–15, 20–26, 27–20
Pts: N'Dong 14; Rebs: N'Dong, Aldemir 5 Asts: Atsür 8		Pts: Waczyński 17; Rebs: Looby 7 Asts: Turner 10

Abdi İpekçi Arena, Istanbul
Attendance: 1,880
Referees: Radomir Vojinovic (MNE), Carmelo Paternico (ITA), Regis Bardera (FRA)

5 December 2012
18:15

Report

PBC Lokomotiv-Kuban (Russia)	64–71	(Ukraine) BC Donetsk
Scoring by quarter: 12–14, 21–13, 18–20, 13–24
Pts: Baron 18; Rebs: Calathes 10; Asts: Calathes 3		Pts: Fischer, Curry, Songaila 12; Rebs: Fischer 13; Asts: Stojanovski, Radenović 2

Basket Hall, Krasnodar
Attendance: 3,500
Referees: Robert Vyklicky (CZE), Damir Javor (SLO), Renaud Geller (BEL)

=== Game 6 ===
12 December 2012
20:00

Report

BC Donetsk (Ukraine)	88–81 (OT)	(Turkey) Galatasaray Medical Park
Scoring by quarter: 16–11, 9–22, 18–18, 27–19, Overtime: 18–11
Pts: Fischer 19; Rebs: Fischer 9 Asts: Perkins 8		Pts: Dudley 23; Rebs: N'Dong 6 Asts: Gordon, Arslan, Hawkins 3

Druzhba Palace of Sports, Donetsk
Attendance: 350
Referees: Dubravko Muhvic (CRO), Ioannis Foufis (GRE), Alexey Davydov (RUS)

12 December 2012
20:00

Report

Trefl Sopot (Poland)	70–87	(Russia) PBC Lokomotiv-Kuban
Scoring by quarter: 16–26, 18–30, 27–10, 9–21
Pts: Dylewicz, Špralja 14; Rebs: Dylewicz, Špralja 6 Asts: Turner 8		Pts: Brown 34; Rebs: Calathes 8 Asts: Calathes 14

Ergo Arena, Gdańsk/Sopot
Attendance: 2,000
Referees: Srdan Dozai (CRO), Sasa Maricic (SRB), Haris Bijedic (BIH)
