= Marko Brkić =

Marko Brkić may refer to:

- Marko Brkić (basketball) (born 1982), Serbian basketball player
- Marko Brkić (footballer) (born 2000), Bosnian footballer
