= Vukašin Aleksić =

Serbian basketball player (born 1985)

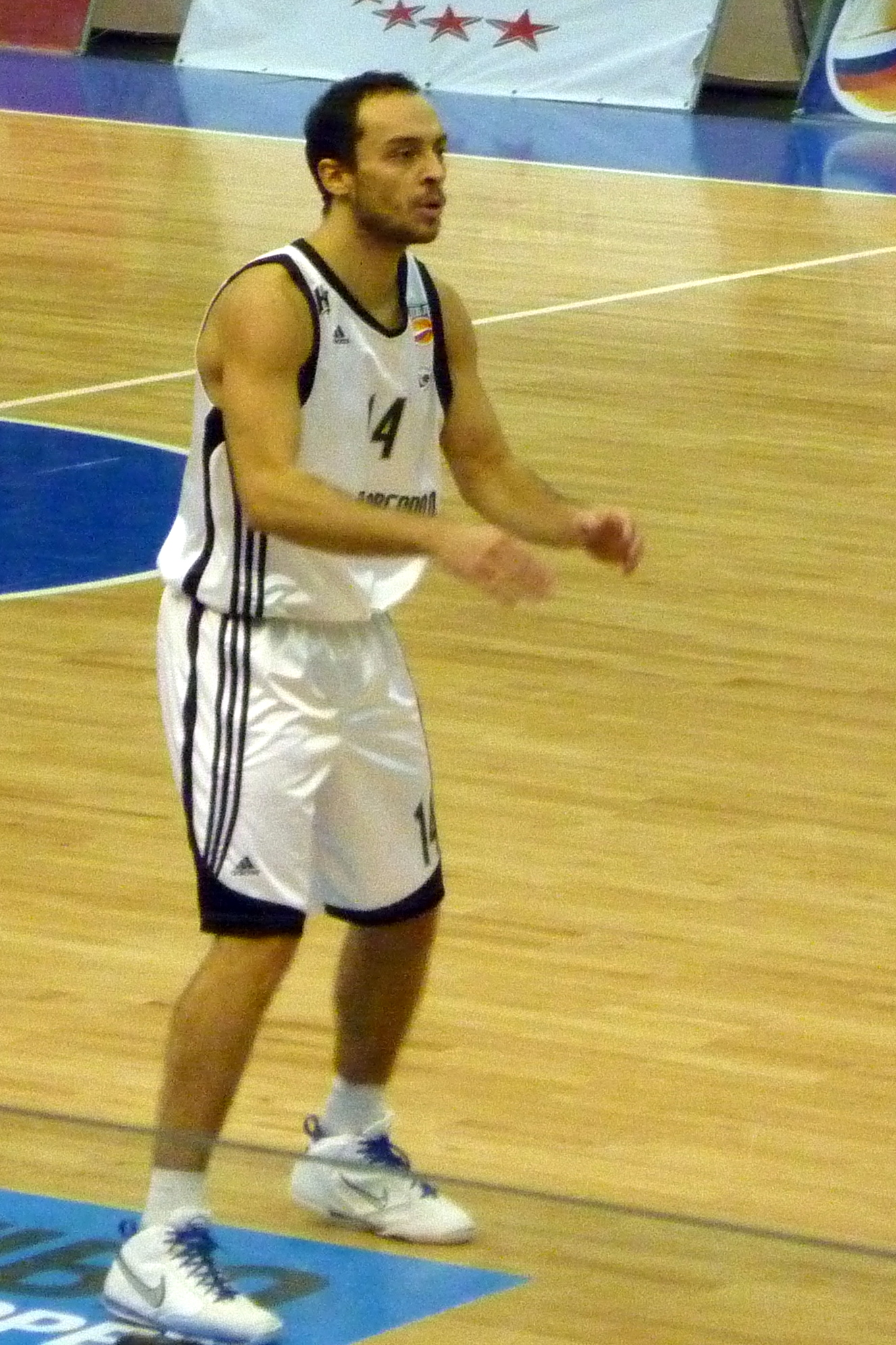
- Aleksić with Nizhny Novgorod in December 2010.

Personal information
- Born: 10 January 1985 (age 41) Belgrade, SR Serbia, SFR Yugoslavia
- Listed height: 1.82 m (6 ft 0 in)
- Listed weight: 78 kg (172 lb)

Career information
- NBA draft: 2007: undrafted
- Playing career: 2002–2014
- Position: Point guard

Career history
- 2002–2003: Hemofarm
- 2003–2005: Lions
- 2005: Hemofarm
- 2005–2006: Mega Vizura
- 2006–2007: Zdravlje Leskovac
- 2007–2008: Lions
- 2008–2009: Partizan Belgrade
- 2009–2010: Radnički Kragujevac
- 2010–2011: Nizhny Novgorod
- 2011: Radnički Kragujevac
- 2011–2012: Igokea
- 2012–2013: Turów Zgorzelec
- 2014: Metalac Valjevo

Career highlights
- Adriatic League champion (2009); Serbian League champion (2009); Serbian Cup winner (2009)
Medals
Men's basketball
Representing Serbia
Universiade
Gold medal – first place	2009 Belgrade	Team competition
Silver medal – second place	2007 Bangkok	Team competition
Representing FR Yugoslavia
European Championship for Cadets
Gold medal – first place	2001 Latvia	Team

Vukašin Aleksić (born 10 January 1985) is a Serbian former professional basketball player.

== Professional career ==
On 22 September 2012 Aleksić signed one-year contract with the Polish team Turów Zgorzelec after passing the 20-day tryout period.

== National team ==
Aleksić won a gold medal at the 2001 Eurobasket With the Serbian national under-16 basketball team.
