= Slavko Vraneš =

Montenegrin basketball player

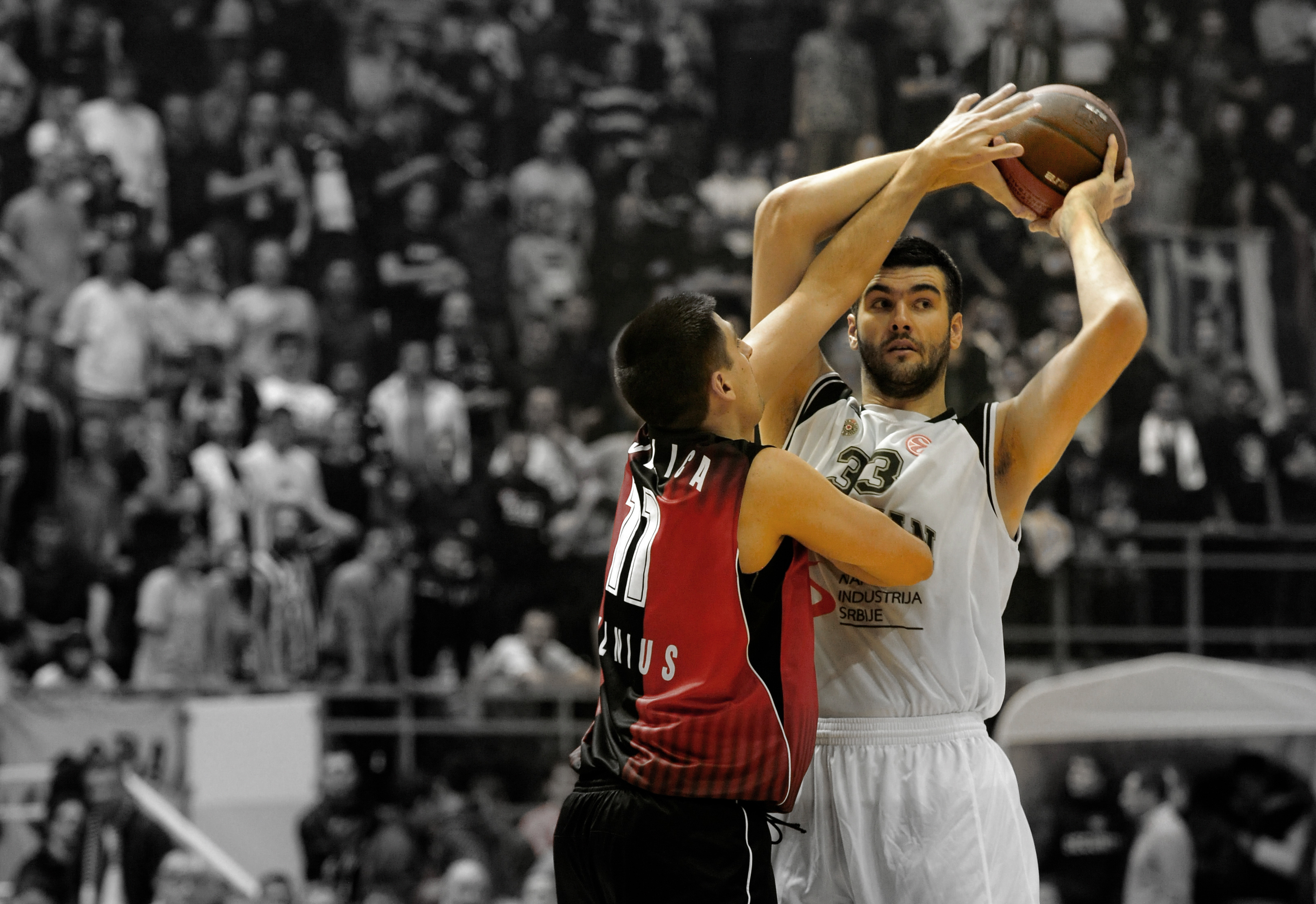
- Vraneš (right) being defended by Milko Bjelica during a EuroLeague game in January 2010

Personal information
- Born: January 30, 1983 (age 43) Pljevlja, SR Montenegro, SFR Yugoslavia
- Listed height: 2.29 m (7 ft 6 in)
- Listed weight: 137 kg (302 lb)

Career information
- NBA draft: 2003: 2nd round, 39th overall pick
- Drafted by: New York Knicks
- Playing career: 1997–2018
- Position: Center
- Number: 11, 12, 29, 33

Career history
- 1997–2000: FMP Železnik
- 2000–2001: Efes Pilsen
- 2001–2003: Budućnost Podgorica
- 2004: Portland Trail Blazers
- 2004: Crvena zvezda
- 2004–2007: Budućnost Podgorica
- 2007–2010: Partizan
- 2010–2011: UNICS Kazan
- 2011–2012: Petrochimi Bandar Imam
- 2013: Metalac Valjevo
- 2013–2014: Zob Ahan Isfahan
- 2015: Metalac Valjevo
- 2015: Petrochimi Bandar Imam
- 2015–2016: Ayandez Sazan Tehran
- 2017–2018: Metalac Valjevo

Career highlights
- Eurocup champion (2011); 3× ABA League champion (2008–2010); 3× Serbian League champion (2008–2010); 3× Serbian Cup winner (2008–2010); Montenegrin League champion (2007); Montenegrin Cup winner (2007)
- Stats at NBA.com
- Stats at Basketball Reference

Slavko Vraneš (Serbian Cyrillic: Славко Вранеш, pronounced [slǎːvkɔ̝ vrâne̞ːʃ]; born 30 January 1983) is a Montenegrin former professional basketball player. Standing at 2.29 m (7 ft 6 in), he was one of the tallest players in the world. While he only played one game in the National Basketball Association (NBA) in his career, a 2004 regular season game for the Portland Trail Blazers, he went on to have a successful career in Europe, winning the 2011 EuroCup with UNICS Kazan. Internationally, Vraneš represented the Montenegrin national team.

== Professional career ==
Vraneš started playing basketball in the Serbian club FMP Železnik. Still a junior, he was snapped up by the Turkish club Efes Pilsen for the 2000–01 season. Then he returned to his native country in January 2001, where he played for Budućnost Podgorica until the summer of 2003.

Vraneš was selected by the National Basketball Association's New York Knicks in the second round of the 2003 NBA draft. He was waived by the Knicks in December 2003 before ever playing a game for them.

In early January 2004, he signed a ten-day contract with Portland Trail Blazers. Before his contract with Portland expired, he played one game on January 8, which became Vraneš's only career NBA game. The game was a 75–96 loss to the Minnesota Timberwolves, where Vraneš played for three minutes and recorded one foul and one missed field goal..

After that, he played briefly for Crvena zvezda. From 2004 to 2007, he played with Budućnost Podgorica for the second time in his career. In October 2007, he signed a three-year contract with Partizan.

In October 2011, he signed with Sanaye Petroshimi BC in the Iranian Super League. During 2013, he played with Metalac Valjevo. In October 2013 he signed with Zob Ahan Isfahan.

On February 10, 2015, he re-signed with Metalac Valjevo. On May 8, he left Metalac Valjevo. Later that month, he returned to his former team Petrochimi Bandar Imam of Iran.

In November 2017, he signed with Metalac Valjevo.

== Career statistics ==
Legend
GP	Games played	GS	Games started	MPG	Minutes per game
FG%	Field-goal percentage	3P%	3-point field-goal percentage	FT%	Free-throw percentage
RPG	Rebounds per game	APG	Assists per game	SPG	Steals per game
BPG	Blocks per game	PPG	Points per game	PIR	Performance index rating
**Bold**	Career high

=== NBA ===
==== Regular season ====
Year	Team	GP	GS	MPG	FG%	3P%	FT%	RPG	APG	SPG	BPG	PPG
2003–04	Portland	1	0	3.0	.000	—	—	.0	.0	.0	.0	.0

=== EuroLeague ===
*	Led the league

Year	Team	GP	GS	MPG	FG%	3P%	FT%	RPG	APG	SPG	BPG	PPG	PIR
2002–03	Budućnost	14	0	9.9	.294	—	.111	1.8	.0	**.2**	1.2	.8	-.4
2007–08	Partizan	**23**	9	12.7	.459	—	.375	2.3	.1	.0	1.0	1.9	1.9
2008–09	Partizan	19	**12**	14.5	**.509**	—	.476	**4.8**	**.3**	**.2**	.8	3.5	4.7
2009–10	Partizan	22*	**12**	**18.1**	.472	—	**.613**	4.6	.2	.0	**1.5**	**4.0**	**5.5**
Career		78	33	14.2	.464	—	.459	3.5	.2	.1	1.2	2.7	3.2

== See also ==
- List of European basketball players in the United States
- List of Montenegrin NBA players
- List of tallest players in National Basketball Association history
