= 2010 Gomelsky Cup =

The 2010 Gomelsky Cup is a European basketball competition that occurred between October 1 and October 3.

== Participants ==
- (Russia) CSKA Moscow - host
- (Serbia) Partizan Belgrade - Euroleague semifinalist
- (Greece) Panathinaikos Athens
- (Lithuania) Žalgiris Kaunas

== Results ==
Semifinals; October 1
(Russia) CSKA Moscow	75
(Serbia) Partizan Belgrade	63
(Greece) Panathinaikos	70
(Lithuania) Žalgiris Kaunas	76

Final; October 3
(Russia) CSKA Moscow	79
(Lithuania) Žalgiris Kaunas	73
Third place
(Greece) Panathinaikos	73
(Serbia) Partizan Belgrade	68

Source: Flashscore

October 3

(Russia) CSKA Moscow	79–73	(Lithuania) Žalgiris Kaunas
Scoring by quarter: 26-10, 14-29, 26-21, 13-13
Pts: Matjaž Smodiš 21; Rebs: Matjaž Smodiš 8 Asts: Ramūnas Šiškauskas 2		Pts: Travis Watson 14; Rebs: Travis Watson 8 Asts: Mantas Kalnietis 4
