= Aleksandar Rašić =

Serbian basketball player

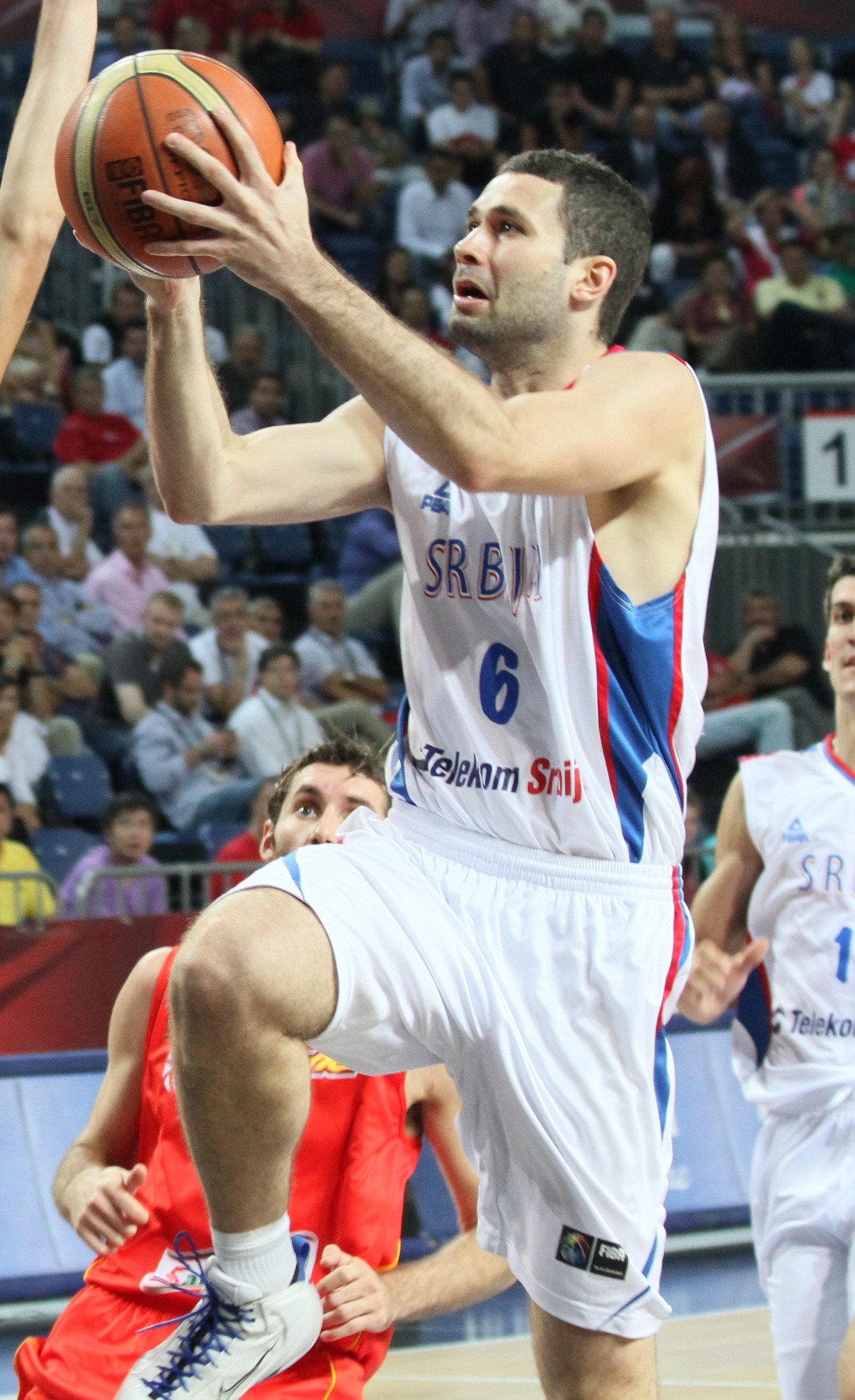
- Rašić with Serbia at the 2010 FIBA World Championship

Mega Basket
- Title: Team Manager
- League: Serbian League; ABA League

Personal information
- Born: March 16, 1984 (age 42) Šabac, SFR Yugoslavia
- Listed height: 1.95 m (6 ft 5 in)
- Listed weight: 198 lb (90 kg)

Career information
- NBA draft: 2006: undrafted
- Playing career: 2003–2019
- Position: Point guard / shooting guard
- Number: 7, 10, 18, 19

Career history
- 2003–2004: Borac Čačak
- 2004–2007: FMP
- 2007: Efes Pilsen
- 2007: Dynamo Moscow
- 2007–2008: Alba Berlin
- 2008–2010: Partizan
- 2010–2011: Trabzonspor
- 2011–2012: Lietuvos rytas
- 2012–2013: Siena
- 2013–2014: TED Ankara Kolejliler
- 2014–2015: Torku Konyaspor
- 2015: Steaua București
- 2015–2016: Türk Telekom
- 2016: Mega
- 2016–2019: U-BT Cluj-Napoca

Career highlights
- 3× ABA League champion (2006, 2009, 2010); 2× Serbian League champion (2009, 2010); 4× Serbian Cup winner (2005, 2006, 2009, 2010); Turkish Cup winner (2007); Bundesliga champion (2008); Italian Serie A champion (2013); Italian Cup winner (2013); Romanian League champion (2017); Romanian Cup winner (2017,2018); Romanian Super Cup winner (2017); Lithuanian League All-Star (2012)

Aleksandar Rašić (Serbian: Александар Рашић; born March 16, 1984) is a Serbian former professional basketball player who is currently the team manager for Mega Basket of the Serbian League (KLS) and the ABA League. He represented the Serbia national basketball team internationally.

== Professional career ==
Rašić began his professional career during the 2003–04 season with Borac Čačak. He then moved to FMP Zeleznik.

In March 2007, he signed with the Turkish team Efes Pilsen, where he stayed for the rest of the season. In August 2007, he signed a two-year deal with the Russian team Dynamo Moscow. In November 2007 he was released by Dynamo. In November 2007, he signed with the German team ALBA Berlin for the remainder of the season. With them he won the Bundesliga. In July 2008, he returned to Serbia and signed with Partizan.

In September 2010, he signed with the Turkish team Trabzonspor. In March 2011, he moved to Lithuania and signed with Lietuvos rytas until the end of the 2011–12 season. In August 2012, he signed a one-year deal with the Italian powerhouse Montepaschi Siena. With them he won the Italian League and Cup. In October 2013, he moved to Turkey and signed a one-year deal with TED Ankara Kolejliler. In July 2014, he signed with another Turkish team Torku Konyaspor.

On September 2, 2015, he signed with the Romanian club Steaua București. On December 12, 2015, he left Steaua and signed with the Turkish club Türk Telekom. On May 2, 2016, he signed with Mega Leks for the rest of the season. On July 8, 2016, Rašić signed with Romanian club U-BT Cluj-Napoca. In September 2019, Rašić announced his retirement.

== National team career ==
As a member of the senior men's Serbian national basketball team, Rašić played at the 2010 FIBA World Championship and the EuroBasket 2011.

== Career statistics ==
Legend
GP	Games played	GS	Games started	MPG	Minutes per game
FG%	Field-goal percentage	3P%	3-point field-goal percentage	FT%	Free-throw percentage
RPG	Rebounds per game	APG	Assists per game	SPG	Steals per game
BPG	Blocks per game	PPG	Points per game	PIR	Performance index rating
**Bold**	Career high

=== Euroleague ===
*	Led the league

Year	Team	GP	GS	MPG	FG%	3P%	FT%	RPG	APG	SPG	BPG	PPG	PIR
2008–09	Partizan	19	**17**	**25.6**	.364	.353	.853	**1.4**	2.2	**.6**	**.1**	7.0	5.7
2009–10	Partizan	**22***	0	17.7	.315	.299	.891	**1.4**	**2.3**	.5	—	**7.3**	6.1
2012–13	Mens Sana	16	3	12.6	**.444**	**.485**	**1.000**	.7	.8	.4	—	4.4	3.2
Career		57	20	17.5	.355	.348	.884	1.2	1.8	.5	.0	6.4	5.2

== See also ==
- List of Serbia men's national basketball team players

Sporting positions
Preceded by Novica Veličković	Team manager of KK Mega Basket; 2025–present	Incumbent
