= Vlado Ilievski =

Macedonian basketball player

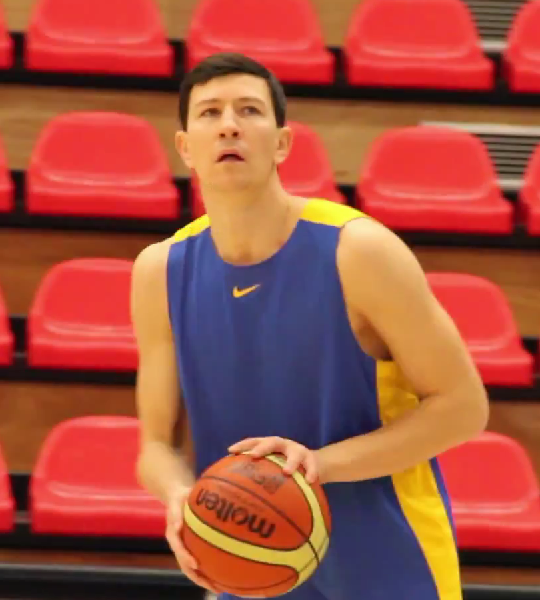

Personal information
- Born: 19 January 1980 (age 46) Strumica, SR Macedonia, SFR Yugoslavia
- Listed height: 1.87 m (6 ft 2 in)
- Listed weight: 82 kg (181 lb)

Career information
- NBA draft: 2002: undrafted
- Playing career: 1998–2017
- Position: Point guard

Career history
- 1997–1998: Nemetali Ogražden
- 1998–2000: Partizan Belgrade
- 2000–2001: Antbirlik Antalya
- 2001–2003: Union Olimpija
- 2003–2005: FC Barcelona Regal
- 2005–2006: Lottomatica Roma
- 2006–2007: VidiVici Bologna
- 2007–2008: Montepaschi Siena
- 2008–2009: Union Olimpija
- 2009: Tau Cerámica
- 2009–2011: Union Olimpija
- 2011: Anadolu Efes
- 2012: Lokomotiv Kuban
- 2012–2013: Cedevita Zagreb
- 2013–2014: ČEZ Nymburk
- 2014–2015: Cibona Zagreb
- 2015–2016: Orlandina Basket
- 2016–2017: Rabotnički

Career highlights
- Adriatic League champion (2002); Slovenian League champion (2002); Spanish League champion (2004); Italian League champion (2008); Czech League champion (2014); 2× Yugoslav Cup winner (1999, 2000); 4× Slovenian Cup winner (2002, 2003, 2010, 2011); Spanish Supercup winner (2004); Italian Supercup winner (2007); Spanish Cup winner (2009); Czech Cup winner (2014)

Vlado Ilievski (Macedonian: Владо Илиевски; born 19 January 1980) is a former Macedonian professional basketball. Standing at 1.88 m (6 ft 2 in), he played at the point guard position.

== Professional career ==
During his career, Ilievski played for Nemetali Ogražden, KK Partizan, Antbirlik Antalya, FC Barcelona Bàsquet, Lottomatica Roma, VidiVici Bologna, Montepaschi Siena, Tau Cerámica, KK Union Olimpija, Anadolu Efes and Lokomotiv Kuban.

On 28 September 2012 Ilievski signed a one-year contract with Croatian team Cedevita Zagreb. On 12 November 2013 Ilievski signed a contract with club ČEZ Nymburk from Czech Republic.

On 7 November 2014 he signed with Cibona Zagreb.

On 10 July 2015, he signed with Italian club Orlandina Basket.

On 7 September 2016, he signed with Rabotnički.

On 9 June 2017, Vlado Ilievski announces his retirement from basketball.

== Career statistics ==
Legend
GP	Games played	GS	Games started	MPG	Minutes per game
FG%	Field-goal percentage	3P%	3-point field-goal percentage	FT%	Free-throw percentage
RPG	Rebounds per game	APG	Assists per game	SPG	Steals per game
BPG	Blocks per game	PPG	Points per game	PIR	Performance index rating
**Bold**	Career high

=== Euroleague ===
*	Led the league

Year	Team	GP	GS	MPG	FG%	3P%	FT%	RPG	APG	SPG	BPG	PPG	PIR
2001–02	Olimpija	20	10	18.0	.500	.433	.762	1.5	1.5	1.3	.1	4.7	5.7
2002–03	Olimpija	20	16	30.6	.486	.381	.711	1.8	2.5	1.4	**.2**	11.5	**11.2**
2003–04	Barcelona	20	**20**	27.0	.426	.434	.765	1.5	2.4	1.3	—	9.9	8.2
2004–05	Barcelona	20	**20**	27.1	.374	.260	.819	1.6	2.2	1.1	.1	9.7	8.5
2006–07	Roma	6	6	30.2	.442	.429	.700	1.8	1.8	**2.2**	—	10.3	8.7
2007–08	Mens Sana	**24**	2	19.2	.408	.344	.800	1.5	1.7	1.3	.0	7.4	7.5
2008–09	Olimpija	6	6	**34.5**	.377	.317	.762	1.7	2.2	1.3	—	**13.5**	7.1
2008–09	Baskonia	11	0	14.3	.542	.385	**1.000**	.6	1.6	.2	.1	3.5	3.5
2009–10	Olimpija	1	0	5.1	**1.000**	**1.000**	—	—	—	—	—	6.0	5.0
2010–11	Olimpija	15	15	34.4*	.371	.319	.875	**2.5**	**4.1**	1.7	—	6.0	5.0
2011–12	Efes	10	0	17.1	.267	.143	.900	1.5	2.6	.8	—	2.7	3.2
2012–13	Cedevita	10	1	20.4	.434	.379	.909	1.2	1.2	.4	—	6.7	5.5
Career		163	96	24.4	.420	.355	.801	1.6	2.2	1.2	.1	8.2	6.5

Euroleague career highs
Stat	High	Opponent	Date
Points	22	Fenerbahçe	November 13, 2008
Total Rebounds	6	Maccabi	February 17, 2011
Assists	8	Charleroi	October 26, 2011
Steals	6	Cerámica	December 13, 2002

== National team ==
Ilievski was also a member of the Macedonia national basketball team. He played a key role in the Eurobasket 2011, leading the competition in minutes per game and scoring the game winning shot in the quarter-finals against Lithuania.

Year	Team	GP	GS	MPG	FG%	3P%	FT%	RPG	APG	SPG	BPG	PPG
EuroBasket 1999	Macedonia	1	0	15.0	.600	1.000	.000	1.0	1.0	1.0	0.0	7.0
EuroBasket 2011	Macedonia	11	11	37.5	.313	.353	.690	2.1	3.2	1.6	0.0	10.0
2012 OQT	Macedonia	3	3	37.3	.364	.304	.600	1.3	3.3	0.6	0.0	12.3
EuroBasket 2013	Macedonia	5	5	32.0	.369	.346	.750	1.8	3.6	1.4	0.0	10.6

== Personal ==
He is married to Anja Vilfan daughter of the former Slovenian basketball player Peter Vilfan. They have two sons Luka and Јakup.

He is a younger brother of Dimče Gaštarski who was also basketball player.
