= Branislav Đekić =

Serbian basketball player

Sloboda Užice
- Position: Power forward
- League: KLS

Personal information
- Born: August 12, 1991 (age 35) Ćuprija, SR Serbia, SFR Yugoslavia
- Listed height: 2.07 m (6 ft 9 in)
- Listed weight: 94 kg (207 lb)

Career information
- NBA draft: 2013: undrafted
- Playing career: 2009–present

Career history
- 2009–2013: Partizan
- 2011: → Mega Vizura
- 2013–2014: Strumica
- 2014–2015: Kumanovo
- 2015–2016: Zlatorog Laško
- 2016: OKK Beograd
- 2016–2017: Feni Industries
- 2018: Rogaška
- 2018–2019: Kumanovo
- 2019–2020: Spars Realway
- 2021: Kumanovo
- 2021–2023: EuroNickel 2005
- 2023: Budućnost Bijeljina
- 2023–present: Sloboda Užice

Career highlights
- 3× Serbian League champion (2010, 2012, 2013); 2× Adriatic League champion (2010, 2013); 2× Serbian Cup winner (2010, 2012); Bosnian Cup winner (2020)
Medals
Men's basketball
Representing Serbia
U18 European Championship
Gold medal – first place	2009 France	U18 National Team
U16 European Championship
Gold medal – first place	2007 Greece	U16 National Team
Representing Serbia and Montenegro
U16 European Championship
Bronze medal – third place	2006 Spain	U16 National Team

Branislav Đekić (Serbian Cyrillic: Бранислав Ђекић; born August 12, 1991) is a Serbian professional basketball player who currently plays for Sloboda Užice of the KLS]. At 2.07 m (6 ft 9 1/2 in), he plays at the power forward position.

== Professional career ==
Đekić started his professional basketball career in 2009 with KK Partizan. He played for Partizan for three years while one year he spent at Mega Vizura on loan.

On November 1, 2013, he signed a one-year contract with Strumica. In his debut on November 3, he scored 14 points and grabbed 9 rebounds in a 72–66 win against Karpos Sokoli. He recorded his first double-double in his second competitive match for Strumica against Liria with 23 points and 10 rebounds.

In November 2014, Đekić signed a contract with Kumanovo for the 2014–15 season. In July 2015, he signed a one-year contract with the Slovenian club Zlatorog Laško.

On November 22, 2016, he signed with Macedonian club Feni Industries for the 2016–17 season.

On January 3, 2018, Đekić signed with Slovenian club Rogaška.

On February 14, 2018, he returned to Kumanovo.

== National team career ==
With the junior national teams of Serbia, Đekić won the gold medal at the 2007 FIBA Europe Under-16 Championship, the gold medal at the 2009 FIBA Europe Under-18 Championship and the bronze medal at the 2006 FIBA Europe Under-16 Championship.

== Career statistics ==
Legend
GP	Games played	GS	Games started	MPG	Minutes per game
FG%	Field-goal percentage	3P%	3-point field-goal percentage	FT%	Free-throw percentage
RPG	Rebounds per game	APG	Assists per game	SPG	Steals per game
BPG	Blocks per game	PPG	Points per game	PIR	Performance index rating
**Bold**	Career high

=== EuroLeague ===
*	Led the league

Year	Team	GP	GS	MPG	FG%	3P%	FT%	RPG	APG	SPG	BPG	PPG	PIR
2009–10	Partizan	**22***	0	**9.5**	.405	**.385**	.700	1.0	**.6**	**.2**	**.1**	**2.6**	**1.3**
2010–11	Partizan	9	**7**	9.3	**.412**	.375	**.750**	**1.6**	.1	**.2**	—	2.2	1.2
2011–12	Partizan	2	0	2.5	.000	—	—	.5	—	—	—	0.0	0.0
Career		33	7	9.1	.400	.382	.708	1.1	.4	.2	.1	2.4	1.2
