= Marko Brkić (basketball) =

Serbian basketball player

Personal information
- Born: July 25, 1982 (age 44) Belgrade, SR Serbia, SFR Yugoslavia
- Listed height: 2.06 m (6 ft 9 in)
- Listed weight: 100 kg (220 lb)

Career information
- NBA draft: 2004: undrafted
- Playing career: 2000–2016
- Position: Power forward

Career history
- 2000–2003: Hemofarm
- 2003–2005: Sloga Kraljevo
- 2005–2006: OKK Beograd
- 2006–2007: Igokea
- 2007–2008: Polpak Świecie
- 2008–2009: Anwil Wloclawek
- 2009–2010: Radnički Kragujevac
- 2010–2011: Turów Zgorzelec
- 2011–2013: Igokea
- 2013–2014: Radnički Kragujevac
- 2014–2015: Szolnoki Olaj
- 2015–2016: Balkan Botevgrad

Career highlights
- Bosnian League champion (2013); 2× Bosnian Cup winner (2007, 2013); 2× Polish League All-Star (2009, 2011); Hungarian League champion (2015); Hungarian Cup winner (2015)

Marko Brkić (born July 25, 1982) is a Serbian former professional basketball player. He is a 2.06 m (6 ft 9 in) tall power forward.
