= Aleks Marić =

Australian-Serbian basketball player (born 1984)

Aleks Marić Александар "Алекс" Марић
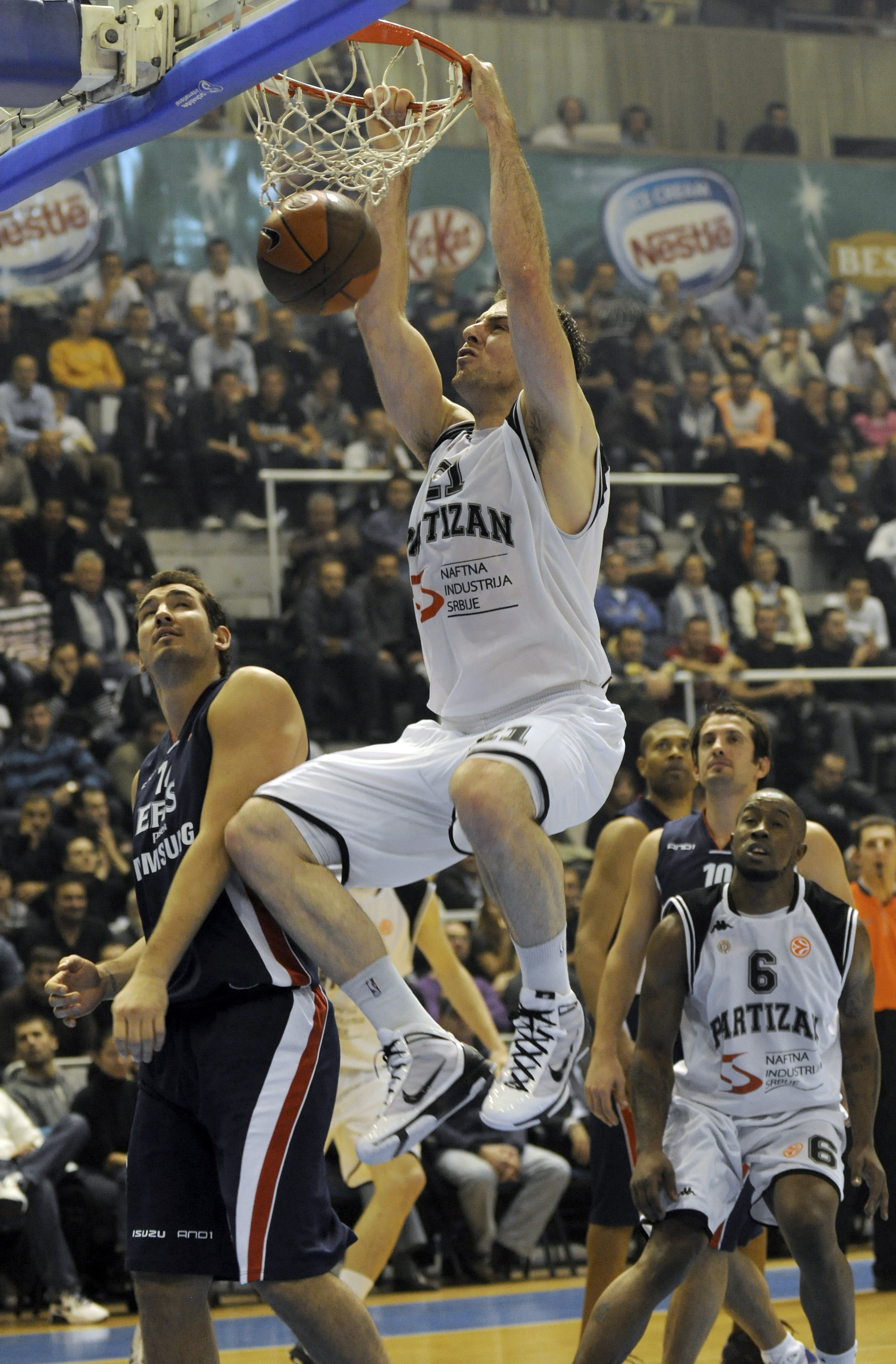
- Marić playing for Partizan in December 2009

Personal information
- Born: 22 October 1984 (age 42) Sydney, New South Wales, Australia
- Listed height: 6 ft 11 in (2.11 m)
- Listed weight: 275 lb (125 kg)

Career information
- High school: Life Center Academy (Burlington, New Jersey)
- College: Nebraska (2004–2008)
- NBA draft: 2008: undrafted
- Playing career: 2008–2017
- Position: Center
- Coaching career: 2019–2020

Career history

Playing
- 2008–2009: Granada
- 2009–2010: Partizan
- 2010–2012: Panathinaikos
- 2012–2014: Lokomotiv Kuban
- 2014: Maccabi Tel Aviv
- 2014–2015: Galatasaray Liv Hospital
- 2015: Petrochimi Bandar Imam
- 2015: Gran Canaria
- 2015–2016: Budućnost Podgorica
- 2016: Obradoiro
- 2016–2017: Sydney Kings
- 2017: Obradoiro
- 2017: Al-Muharraq

Coaching
- 2019–2020: Sydney Kings (assistant)

Career highlights
- EuroLeague champion (2011); All-EuroLeague First Team (2010); EuroCup champion (2013); ABA League champion (2010); Serbian League champion (2010); Serbian Cup winner (2010); Serbian Cup MVP (2010); Greek League champion (2011); Greek Cup winner (2012); VTB United League rebounding leader (2013); All-VTB United League Second Team (2013); Montenegrin Cup winner (2016); 2× Second-team All-Big 12 (2007, 2008)

Aleksandar "Aleks" Marić (Serbian Cyrillic: Александар "Алекс" Марић; born 22 October 1984) is an Australian-Serbian former professional basketball player. Marić gained a reputation as a winner over the course of his successful European career, securing contracts with several basketball powerhouse outfits. Rising to stardom at Partizan Belgrade in 2010, he was part of a Serbian Cup and Adriatic League championship winning team, as well as an All-EuroLeague First Team member. That breakout season earned him selection to the Australian national team for the 2010 World Championships and the 2012 London Olympics. In 2019, he became an assistant coach with the Sydney Kings.

== Early life and career ==
Marić began playing basketball as a youth in Sydney before attending the Australian Institute of Sport in 2002 and 2003. He played high school basketball in the United States at Life Center Academy in Burlington, New Jersey. He then played college basketball at the University of Nebraska with the Nebraska Cornhuskers from 2004 to 2008, where he was named second-team All-Big 12 Conference in both 2007 and 2008.

=== College statistics ===
College	Year	GP	GS	MIN	SPG	BPG	RPG	APG	PPG	FG%	FT%	3P%
Nebraska	2004–05	27	10	20.8	0.5	0.6	6.3	0.5	8.0	.479	.716	.000
Nebraska	2005–06	31	26	25.3	0.8	1.3	8.1	1.2	10.9	.472	.611	.000
Nebraska	2006–07	30	30	28.8	0.5	1.1	8.7	0.8	18.5	.565	.681	.300
Nebraska	2007–08	33	33	29.3	1.3	1.7	10.2	1.9	15.7	.575	.657	.167

== Professional career ==
Marić began his professional career in July 2008 with the Spanish ACB League club Granada. At the end of the season, on 30 June 2009, he exercised the option in his contract and decided to leave the club.

On 7 July 2009, Marić signed multi-year deal with the Serbian club Partizan. During his first season in Partizan, Marić went from the status of a relatively unknown basketball player to one of a EuroLeague star, all thanks to his great games throughout the season. In 93–92 win over Efes Pilsen in the EuroLeague, he scored 34 points, pulled 16 rebounds and had 49 performance index rating which was record of the season, along with Darjuš Lavrinovič who also had 49 in the same season. That made them 8th overall in PIR since the beginning of the 2000–01 Euroleague season. He was named to the 2009–10 All-EuroLeague Team. With Partizan, he managed to win the Serbian national cup trophy (the Radivoj Korać Cup), as well as the Adriatic Championship in the amazing overtime finish.

On 30 July 2010, Marić signed a two-year contract with the Greek club Panathinaikos. In his first season with the club, he won the EuroLeague title in win over the Maccabi Tel Aviv. Later, he won and the Greek Basket League championship. In his second season, he won the Greek basketball cup.

On 27 July 2012, Marić signed with the VTB United League club Lokomotiv Kuban Krasnodar.

On 2 September 2014, Marić signed with Maccabi Tel Aviv. On 25 December 2014, he was waived by Maccabi. The next day, he signed with the Turkish team Galatasaray Liv Hospital. On 3 March 2015, he left Galatasaray and signed with Petrochimi Bandar Imam of the Iranian Super League. On 29 April 2015, he left Petrochimi and signed with the Spanish club Gran Canaria for the rest of the 2014–15 ACB season.

On 3 September 2015, Marić signed with the Montenegrin club Budućnost Podgorica for the 2015–16 season. After some miserable showings in the first few games of the ABA League, he led his team to an 80–61 win over Tajfun with 20 points and 10 rebounds, and was subsequently named the MVP of Round 5. On 4 April 2016, he left Budućnost and signed with Spanish club Rio Natura Monbus Obradoiro for the rest of the 2015–16 ACB season.

On 29 June 2016, Marić signed a one-year deal (with a team option for a second year) with his hometown Sydney Kings of the National Basketball League. On 9 March 2017, Marić signed with Rio Natura Monbus Obradoiro for the rest of the 2016–17 ACB season.

On 26 June 2017, Marić signed with Al-Muharraq of the Bahraini Premier League. He played one game for the team.

== Australian national team ==
With the Australian junior national team, Marić won the gold medal at the 2003 FIBA Under-19 World Championship. He also played at the 2005 FIBA Under-21 World Championship with Australia's junior national team. Media reports emanating from Serbia stated Maric had expressed a desire to play for the senior Serbia national basketball team, however this was later denied by Maric.

Marić played for the senior Australia national basketball team at the 2010 FIBA World Championship in Turkey. Marić averaged 9.2 points and 4.3 rebounds over 6 games at the tournament.

He also played with Australia at the 2012 Olympics in London where Australia lost 119–86 in quarterfinal matchup with the United States.

== Post-playing career ==
In July 2019, Marić was appointed an assistant coach by the Sydney Kings.

== Career statistics ==
Legend
GP	Games played	GS	Games started	MPG	Minutes per game
FG%	Field-goal percentage	3P%	3-point field-goal percentage	FT%	Free-throw percentage
RPG	Rebounds per game	APG	Assists per game	SPG	Steals per game
BPG	Blocks per game	PPG	Points per game	PIR	Performance index rating
**Bold**	Career high

=== EuroLeague ===
†	Denotes season in which Marić won the EuroLeague
*	Led the league

Year	Team	GP	GS	MPG	FG%	3P%	FT%	RPG	APG	SPG	BPG	PPG	PIR
2009–10	Partizan	18	9	**25.5**	.607	.000	.648	**8.4**	**1.2**	**1.2**	**.6**	**14.6**	**21.1***
2010–11†	Panathinaikos	8	0	7.6	.556	—	.667	3.5	—	.6	.4	3.5	6.3
2011–12	Panathinaikos	22	9	7.1	**.673**	—	.560	2.5	.1	.5	.1	3.6	4.9
2013–14	Lokomotiv Kuban	**23**	**10**	17.2	.602	—	.588	3.6	1.0	.8	.6	6.1	8.0
2014–15	Maccabi	8	2	8.8	.571	—	**1.000**	2.3	.5	.1	.4	2.3	3.9
2014–15	Galatasaray	7	2	10.0	.385	—	.500	2.9	.7	.1	—	1.7	2.3
Career		86	32	14.1	.603	.000	.625	4.1	.7	.7	.4	6.3	8.9

== Personal life ==
Marić was born on 22 October 1984 in the suburb Liverpool of Sydney, Australia to ethnic Serb parents from Knin, SR Croatia, SFR Yugoslavia. He subsequently became a Serbian citizen. His grandfather Stevan was killed at his home during Operation Storm and his body was exhumed from a mass grave 17 years later.

== See also ==
- List of foreign basketball players in Serbia
