= Šime Špralja =

Croatian basketball player

Sonik-Puntamika
- Position: Power forward / center
- League: Croatian League

Personal information
- Born: December 6, 1983 (age 42) Zadar, SR Croatia, SFR Yugoslavia
- Listed height: 6 ft 9 in (2.06 m)
- Listed weight: 234 lb (106 kg)

Career information
- NBA draft: 2005: undrafted
- Playing career: 2000–present

Career history
- 2000–2005: Zadar
- 2005–2008: Split
- 2006–2010: Široki
- 2011–2012: ČEZ Nymburk
- 2012: Timișoara
- 2012–2013: Trefl Sopot
- 2013–2014: Vanoli Cremona
- 2014–2015: Sharks Antibes
- 2015–2016: Kvarner 2010
- 2016–2017: Jolly Jadranska Banka
- 2017–2019: Zadar
- 2019–present: Sonik-Puntamika

Career highlights
- Adriatic League champion (2003); 2× Croatian Cup winner (2003, 2005); Bosnian Cup winner (2008)

Šime Špralja (born December 6, 1983) is a Croatian professional basketball player who plays for Sonik-Puntamika of the Croatian HT Premijer liga. Standing at 2.06 m (6 ft 9 in), he plays the power forward and center positions.
