= 2009–10 Euroleague =

Professional basketball competition

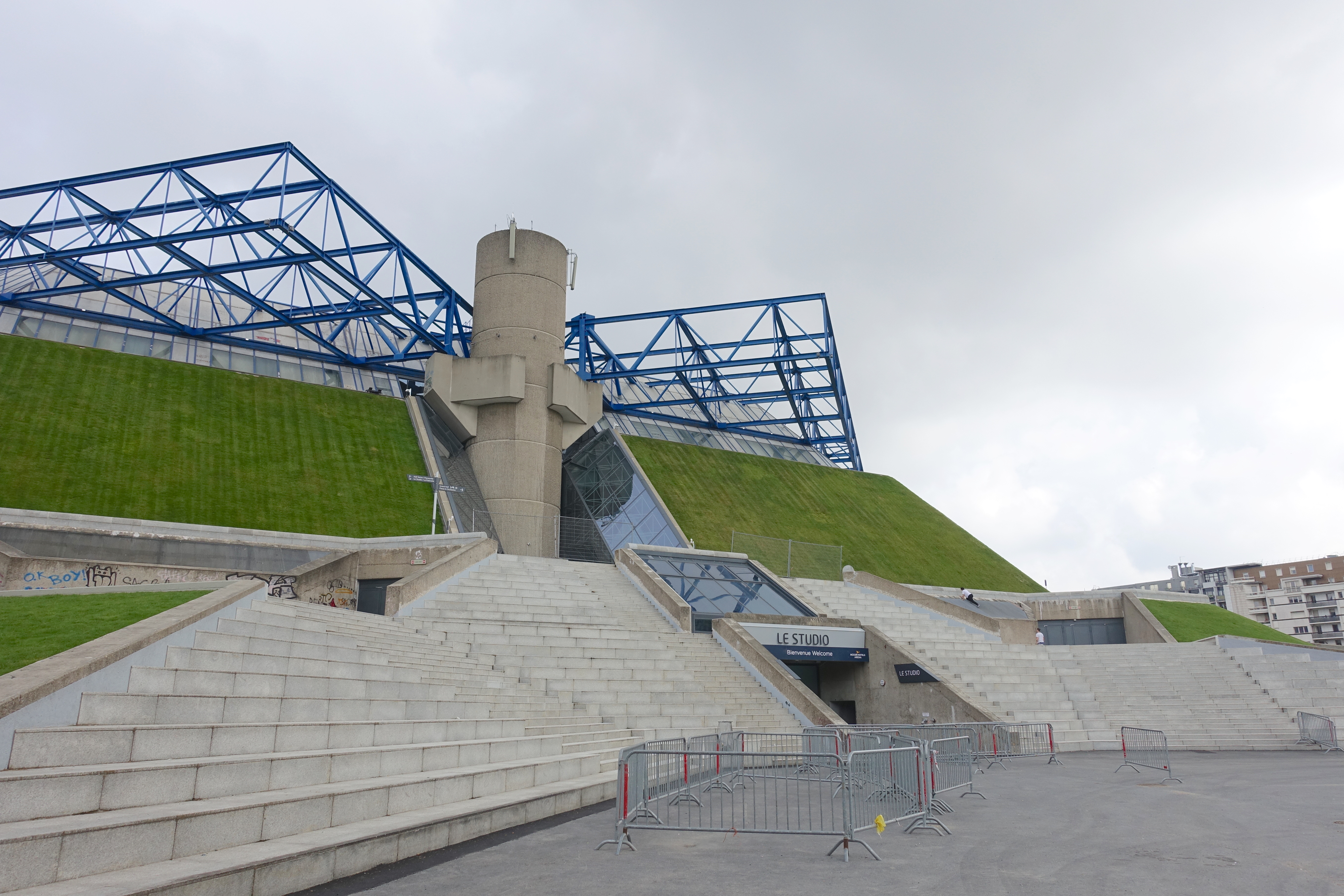
- Paris-Bercy in Paris hosted the Final Four
- Season: 2009–10
- Duration: 29 September 2009 – 9 May 2010
- Teams: 24 (regular season); 30 (total)

Regular season
- Season MVP: (Serbia) Miloš Teodosić

Finals
- Champions: (Spain) Regal FC Barcelona (2nd title)
- Runners-up: (Greece) Olympiacos
- Third place: (Russia) CSKA Moscow
- Fourth place: (Serbia) Partizan
- Final Four MVP: (Spain) Juan Carlos Navarro

Statistical leaders
Points	(Lithuania) Linas Kleiza	17.1
Rebounds	(United States) Travis Watson	9.5
Assists	(Montenegro) Omar Cook	5.9
Index Rating	(Australia) Aleks Marić	21.1

The 2009–10 Euroleague was the 10th season of the Euroleague, a professional basketball competition for elite clubs throughout Europe organised by Euroleague Basketball Company, and it was the 53rd season of the premier competition for European men's clubs overall. The regular season featured 24 teams from 13 countries.

This season marked the first time since 2001–02 season that a qualifying round was used to determine the last two teams for the regular season. The qualifying round started on September 29, 2009, while the regular season of the Euroleague started on October 15, 2010. The season ended with the Euroleague Final Four, which was hosted at the Palais Omnisports de Paris-Bercy in Paris, France, with the final on May 9, 2010.

== Format ==
For the first time in the modern Euroleague era, a preliminary stage was used to determine the last two teams in the regular season. 8 teams competed in qualification rounds, of which the 2 winners advanced to the regular season stage. Those teams joined 22 teams that had qualified directly to the regular season stage.

== Allocation ==
A maximum of three teams could qualify from any one country through their league position. However, 14 clubs held Euroleague Basketball A-linceces, which gave them automatic spots in the Euroleague Regular Season until 2011–12, regardless of their domestic league finish. These licenses were granted via a formula that considers each team's performance in its domestic league and the Euroleague, the television revenues Euroleague Basketball collects from its home country and the team's home attendance.

A-licence holders

- Spain: Caja Laboral, Real Madrid, Regal FC Barcelona, Unicaja
- Italy: Montepaschi Siena, Lottomatica Roma
- Greece: Olympiacos, Panathinaikos
- Russia: CSKA Moscow
- Turkey: Efes Pilsen, Fenerbahçe Ülker
- Lithuania: Žalgiris
- Israel: Maccabi Electra Tel Aviv
- France: ASVEL (qualifying round)

The rest of the field was filled with teams that qualified through their performance in their respective national leagues and wild card invitations.

== Teams ==
- A - licensed clubs: teams with 3-year licence
- Associated clubs: teams with B and C temporary licenses
- 1st, 2nd, etc.: League position after Playoffs
- EC: Champion of the 2008–09 Eurocup Basketball
- WC: Wild card

Regular season
A-license
(Spain) Regal FC Barcelona (1st)	(Greece) Panathinaikos^{TH} (1st)	(Poland) Asseco Prokom Gdynia (1st)
(Spain) Caja Laboral (2nd)	(Greece) Olympiacos (2nd)	(Russia) CSKA Moscow (1st)
(Spain) Real Madrid (3rd)	(Italy) Montepaschi Siena (1st)	(Slovenia) Union Olimpija (1st)
(Spain) Unicaja (4th)	(Italy) Lottomatica Roma (5th)	
(Turkey) Anadolu Efes (1st)	(Israel) Maccabi Electra (1st)	
(Turkey) Fenerbahçe Ülker (2nd)	(Lithuania) Žalgiris (2nd)	
Associated clubs
(Croatia) Cibona (1st)	(Italy) Armani Jeans Milano (2nd)	(Russia) Khimki (2nd)
(France) ASVEL (1st)	(Lithuania) Lietuvos rytas (1st)^{EC}	
(Germany) EWE Oldenburg (1st)	(Serbia) Partizan (1st)	
Qualifying rounds
(France) Entente Orléanaise (2nd)	(Greece) Maroussi (3rd)	(Belgium) Spirou Charleroi (1st)
(France) Le Mans (3rd)	(Greece) Aris (4th)	(Latvia) Ventspils (1st)
(Germany) Alba Berlin (3rd)^{WC}	(Italy) Benetton Treviso (3rd)	

1. Eurocup (EC): Lietuvos Rytas was the ULEB Eurocup 2008–09 champion, which carried with it a one-year "C Licence" into the Euroleague Regular Season. However, the club also earned a one-season "B Licence" for the Euroleague by winning its domestic championship, and the league's ranking was sufficiently high to give Rytas direct entry into the Regular Season. As a result, the Eurocup champion's C Licence went to Khimki Moscow Region of the Russian Basketball Super League as the ULEB Eurocup 2008–09 finalist.

== Qualifying rounds ==
=== First preliminary round ===
Games were played on September 29 and October 2. Winners advanced to the second preliminary round, while losers parachuted into the Eurocup.

Team 1	Agg.	Team 2	1st leg	2nd leg
Spirou (Belgium)	111–134	(France) Entente Orléanaise	55–53	56–81
Ventspils (Latvia)	154–161	(Italy) Benetton Treviso	78–73	76–88
Le Mans (France)	123–137	(Germany) Alba Berlin	61–60	62–77
Aris (Greece)	129–156	(Greece) Maroussi	69–67	60–89

=== Second preliminary round ===
Game 1 of each match was played on October 6. Game 2 of the Benetton Treviso-Entente Orléanaise match was played on October 9, and Game 2 of Maroussi-Alba Berlin was played on October 11. The winners of each match advanced to the Regular Season, with the losers parachuting into the Eurocup.

Team 1	Agg.	Team 2	1st leg	2nd leg
Benetton Treviso (Italy)	155–162	(France) Entente Orléanaise	73–82	82–80
Maroussi (Greece)	149–145	(Germany) Alba Berlin	79–70	70–75

== Regular season ==
The Regular Season began on October 15, 2009, and concluded on January 14, 2010.

If teams were level on record at the end of the Regular Season, tiebreakers were applied in the following order:

1. Head-to-head record.
2. Head-to-head point differential.
3. Point differential during the Regular Season.
4. Points scored during the regular season.
5. Sum of quotients of points scored and points allowed in each Regular Season match.

Key to colors
Top four places in each group advanced to Top 16

=== Group A ===
	Team	Pld	W	L	PF	PA	Diff
1.	(Spain) Regal FC Barcelona	10	10	0	833	625	+208
2.	(Italy) Montepaschi Siena	10	8	2	830	689	+141
3.	(Lithuania) Žalgiris	10	3	7	673	739	−66
4.	(Croatia) Cibona VIP	10	3	7	637	742	−105
5.	(France) ASVEL	10	3	7	680	749	−69
6.	(Turkey) Fenerbahçe Ülker	10	3	7	690	799	−109

=== Group B ===
	Team	Pld	W	L	PF	PA	Diff
1.	(Greece) Olympiacos	10	8	2	884	787	+97
2.	(Spain) Unicaja	10	7	3	784	775	+9
3.	(Serbia) Partizan	10	5	5	745	757	−12
4.	(Turkey) Efes Pilsen	10	4	6	808	793	+15
5.	(Lithuania) Lietuvos rytas	10	4	6	741	784	−43
6.	(France) Entente Orléanaise	10	2	8	722	788	−66

=== Group C ===
	Team	Pld	W	L	PF	PA	Diff
1.	(Russia) CSKA Moscow	10	8	2	730	700	+30
2.	(Spain) Caja Laboral	10	7	3	779	735	+46
3.	(Israel) Maccabi Electra Tel Aviv	10	6	4	794	737	+57
4.	(Greece) Maroussi	10	4	6	744	764	−20
5.	(Italy) Lottomatica Roma	10	4	6	713	737	−24
6.	(Slovenia) Union Olimpija	10	1	9	677	764	−87

=== Group D ===
	Team	Pld	W	L	PF	PA	Diff
1.	(Spain) Real Madrid	10	8	2	811	690	+121
2.	(Greece) Panathinaikos	10	8	2	792	697	+95
3.	(Russia) Khimki	10	6	4	740	733	+7
4.	(Poland) Asseco Prokom	10	4	6	747	810	−63
5.	(Italy) Armani Jeans Milano	10	3	7	724	741	−17
6.	(Germany) Oldenburg	10	1	9	657	800	−143

== Top 16 ==
The survivors from the Regular Season advanced to the Top 16, where they were drawn into four groups of four teams each, playing home-and-home from January 27 through March 11. The draw was held at Euroleague headquarters in Barcelona, starting at 13:00 CET on January 18, and was streamed live on the official Euroleague site.

Key to colors
Top two places in each group advanced to quarterfinals

=== Group E ===
	Team	Pld	W	L	PF	PA	Diff
1.	(Spain) Regal FC Barcelona	6	5	1	465	396	+69
2.	(Serbia) Partizan	6	3	3	389	422	−33
3.	(Greece) Panathinaikos	6	2	4	439	442	−3
4.	(Greece) Maroussi	6	2	4	419	452	−33

=== Group F ===
	Team	Pld	W	L	PF	PA	Diff
1.	(Israel) Maccabi Electra Tel Aviv	6	4	2	444	423	+21
2.	(Spain) Real Madrid	6	3	3	447	444	+3
3.	(Italy) Montepaschi Siena	6	3	3	481	497	−16
4.	(Turkey) Efes Pilsen	6	2	4	437	445	−8

=== Group G ===
	Team	Pld	W	L	PF	PA	Diff
1.	(Russia) CSKA Moscow	6	5	1	494	448	+46
2.	(Poland) Asseco Prokom	6	3	3	471	455	+16
3.	(Spain) Unicaja	6	2	4	450	452	−2
4.	(Lithuania) Žalgiris	6	2	4	454	514	−60

=== Group H ===
	Team	Pld	W	L	PF	PA	Diff
1.	(Greece) Olympiacos	6	5	1	536	504	+32
2.	(Spain) Caja Laboral	6	3	3	515	521	−6
3.	(Russia) Khimki	6	3	3	476	487	−11
4.	(Croatia) Cibona VIP	6	1	5	486	501	−15

== Quarterfinals ==
Team 1 hosted Games 1 and 2, plus Game 5 if necessary. Team 2 hosted Game 3, and Game 4 if necessary.

Team 1	Agg.	Team 2	1st leg	2nd leg	3rd leg	4th leg	5th leg
Regal FC Barcelona (Spain)	3–1	(Spain) Real Madrid	68–61	63–70	84–73	84–78	
Maccabi Electra Tel Aviv (Israel)	1–3	(Serbia) Partizan	77–85	98–78	73–81	67–76	
CSKA Moscow (Russia)	3–1	(Spain) Caja Laboral	86–63	83–63	53–66	74–70	
Olympiacos (Greece)	3–1	(Poland) Asseco Prokom Gdynia	83–79	90–73	78–81	86–70	

== Final four ==
Semifinals; May 7
(Spain) Regal FC Barcelona	64
(Russia) CSKA Moscow	54
(Serbia) Partizan	80
(Greece) Olympiacos	83

Final; May 9
(Spain) Regal FC Barcelona	86
(Greece) Olympiacos	68
Third place
(Russia) CSKA Moscow	90
(Serbia) Partizan	88

2009–10 Euroleague Champions

Regal FC Barcelona
2nd title

== Individual statistics ==
=== Rating ===
Rank	Name	Team	Games	Rating	PIR
1.	(Australia) Aleks Marić	(Serbia) Partizan	18	380	21.11
2.	(Lithuania) Linas Kleiza	(Greece) Olympiacos	22	393	17.86
3.	(Lithuania) Ramūnas Šiškauskas	(Russia) CSKA Moscow	21	356	16.95

=== Points ===
Rank	Name	Team	Games	Rating	PPG
1.	(Lithuania) Linas Kleiza	(Greece) Olympiacos	20	345	17.25
2.	(United States) Qyntel Woods	(Poland) Asseco Prokom Gdynia	20	337	16.85
3.	(Croatia) Marko Tomas	(Croatia) Cibona	16	263	16.44

=== Rebounds ===
Rank	Name	Team	Games	Rating	RPG
1.	(Australia) Aleks Marić	(Serbia) Partizan	16	137	8.56
2.	(United States) Lawrence Roberts	(Serbia) Partizan	19	140	7.37
3.	(Lithuania) Linas Kleiza	(Greece) Olympiacos	20	128	6.40

=== Assists ===
Rank	Name	Team	Games	Rating	APG
1.	(Montenegro) Omar Cook	(Spain) Unicaja	16	95	5.94
2.	(Serbia) Miloš Teodosić	(Greece) Olympiacos	20	104	5.20
3.	(Greece) Theodoros Papaloukas	(Greece) Olympiacos	17	88	5.18

=== Other Stats ===
Category	Name	Team	Games	Stat
Steals per game	(North Macedonia) Bo McCalebb	(Serbia) Partizan	23	1.95
Steals per game	(Russia) Viktor Khryapa	(Russia) CSKA Moscow	23	1.95
Blocks per game	(Israel) D'or Fischer	(Israel) Maccabi Electra Tel Aviv	20	1.80
Turnovers per game	(United States) Qyntel Woods	(Poland) Asseco Prokom	20	3.45
Fouls drawn per game	(Australia) Aleks Marić	(Serbia) Partizan	18	7.00
Minutes per game	(Poland) David Logan	(Poland) Asseco Prokom	20	36:21
2FG%	(United States) Terence Morris	(Spain) Regal FC Barcelona	21	0.825
3FG%	(Lithuania) Ramūnas Šiškauskas	(Russia) CSKA Moscow	21	0.550
FT%	(Bosnia and Herzegovina) Henry Domercant	(Italy) Montepaschi Siena	16	0.937

=== Game highs ===
Category	Name	Team	Stat
Rating	(Australia) Aleks Marić	(Serbia) Partizan	49
Rating	(Lithuania) Darjuš Lavrinovič	(Spain) Real Madrid	49
Points	(Australia) Aleks Marić	(Serbia) Partizan	39
Rebounds	(United States) Travis Watson	(Lithuania) Žalgiris	17
Assists	(Greece) Theodoros Papaloukas	(Greece) Olympiacos	14
Steals	(United States) Terrell McIntyre	(Italy) Montepaschi Siena	7
Blocks	3 occasions		5
Turnovers	8 occasions		7
Fouls Drawn	(Croatia) Marko Tomas	(Croatia) Cibona	12

== Awards ==
=== Euroleague 2009–10 MVP ===
- (Serbia) Miloš Teodosić ( (Greece) Olympiacos)

=== Euroleague 2009–10 Final Four MVP ===
- (Spain) Juan Carlos Navarro ( (Spain) Regal FC Barcelona)

=== All-Euroleague Team 2009–10 ===
Position	All-Euroleague First Team	Club team	All-Euroleague Second Team	Club team
PG	(Serbia) Miloš Teodosić	(Greece) Olympiacos	(North Macedonia) Bo McCalebb	(Serbia) Partizan
SG/SF	(Spain) Juan Carlos Navarro	(Spain) Regal FC Barcelona	(United States) Josh Childress	(Greece) Olympiacos
SG/SF	(Lithuania) Linas Kleiza	(Greece) Olympiacos	(Lithuania) Ramūnas Šiškauskas	(Russia) CSKA Moscow
PF/C	(Russia) Victor Khryapa	(Russia) CSKA Moscow	(Slovenia) Erazem Lorbek	(Spain) Regal FC Barcelona
PF/C	(Australia) Aleks Marić	(Serbia) Partizan	(Brazil) Tiago Splitter	(Spain) Caja Laboral

=== Rising Star ===
- (Spain) Ricky Rubio ( (Spain) Regal FC Barcelona)

=== Best Defender ===
- (Russia) Victor Khryapa ( (Russia) CSKA Moscow)

=== Top scorer (Alphonso Ford Trophy) ===
- (Lithuania) Linas Kleiza ( (Greece) Olympiacos)

=== Coach of the Year (Alexander Gomelsky Award) ===
- (Spain) Xavier Pascual ( (Spain) Regal FC Barcelona)

=== Club Executive of the Year ===
- (Poland) Przemyslaw Seczkowski ( (Poland) Asseco Prokom Gdynia)

=== MVP Weekly ===
==== Regular season ====
Game	Player	Team	Rating
1	(Lithuania) Darjuš Lavrinovič	(Spain) Real Madrid	49
2	(Brazil) Tiago Splitter	(Spain) Caja Laboral	36
2	(United States) Matt Walsh	(Slovenia) Union Olimpija	36
3	(Central African Republic) Romain Sato	(Italy) Montepaschi Siena	37
4	(Greece) Ioannis Bourousis	(Greece) Olympiacos	32
5	(United States) Keith Langford	(Russia) Khimki	38
5	(Australia) Aleks Marić	(Serbia) Partizan	38
6	(Lithuania) Dainius Šalenga	(Lithuania) Žalgiris	28
7	(Australia) Aleks Marić (2)	(Serbia) Partizan	49
8	(Australia) Aleks Marić (3)	(Serbia) Partizan	29
9	(Serbia) Miloš Teodosić	(Greece) Olympiacos	34
9	(United States) Chuck Eidson	(Israel) Maccabi Electra Tel Aviv	34
10	(Spain) Ricky Rubio	(Spain) Regal FC Barcelona	33
10	(Lithuania) Ramūnas Šiškauskas	(Russia) CSKA Moscow	33

==== Top 16 ====
Game	Player	Team	PIR
1	(Lithuania) Ramūnas Šiškauskas (2)	(Russia) CSKA Moscow	29
1	(Lithuania) Robertas Javtokas	(Russia) Khimki	29
1	(Spain) Fernando San Emeterio	(Spain) Caja Laboral	29
2	(United States) Alan Anderson	(Israel) Maccabi Electra Tel Aviv	40
3	(United States) Terrell McIntyre	(Italy) Montepaschi Siena	43
4	(United States) Jamont Gordon	(Croatia) Cibona	40
5	(Croatia) Bojan Bogdanović	(Croatia) Cibona	28
6	(Central African Republic) Romain Sato (2)	(Italy) Montepaschi Siena	27

==== Quarter-finals ====
Game	Player	Team	PIR
1	(Serbia) Dušan Kecman	(Serbia) Partizan	30
2	(Lithuania) Linas Kleiza	(Greece) Olympiacos	35
3	(Spain) Juan Carlos Navarro	(Spain) Regal FC Barcelona	29
4	(Spain) Fernando San Emeterio (2)	(Spain) Caja Laboral	30

=== MVP of Month ===
Month	Player	Team
October 2009	(Serbia) Bojan Popović	(Lithuania) Lietuvos rytas
November 2009	(United States) Pete Mickeal	(Spain) Regal FC Barcelona
December 2009	(Australia) Aleks Marić	(Serbia) Partizan
January 2010	(Serbia) Miloš Teodosić	(Greece) Olympiacos
February 2010	(United States) Alan Anderson	(Israel) Maccabi Electra Tel Aviv
March 2010	(Russia) Victor Khryapa	(Russia) CSKA Moscow
April 2010	(Spain) Juan Carlos Navarro	(Spain) Regal FC Barcelona

== Attendance figures ==
Rank	Club	# Of Home Games	Total Attendance	Arena Capacity
1.	(Israel) Maccabi Electra Tel Aviv	8	90,500	11,700
2.	(Greece) Panathinaikos	7	67,722	19,250
3.	(Spain) Caja Laboral	7	64,830	9,900
4.	(Spain) Unicaja	8	62,531	10,500
5.	(Spain) Real Madrid	7	60,100	15,000
6.	(Greece) Olympiacos	8	55,129	14,905
7.	(Turkey) Efes Pilsen	8	55,013	12,500
8.	(Serbia) Partizan	8	54,893	8,150
9.	(Lithuania) Lietuvos rytas	5	40,000	11,000
10.	(Lithuania) Žalgiris	8	37,433	5,000
11.	(Spain) Regal FC Barcelona	7	35,816	8,250
12.	(France) ASVEL	5	33,930	5,800
13.	(Croatia) Cibona	8	32,365	5,400
14.	(France) Entente Orleanaise*	7	31,805	6,900
15.	(Italy) Montepaschi Siena	7	31,338	7,025
16.	(Poland) Prokom Gdynia	7	29,785	5,000
17.	(Greece) Maroussi*	10	28,100	19,250
18.	(Russia) CSKA Moscow	7	25,340	5,500
19.	(Russia) Khimki	7	25,129	6,000
20.	(Slovenia) Union Olimpija	5	24,000	6,000
21.	(Germany) Alba Berlin*	2	23,506	16,000
22.	(Italy) Lottomatica Roma	5	21,147	11,200
23.	(Germany) EWE Baskets Oldenburg	5	16,080	5,118
24.	(Italy) Armani Jeans Milano	5	12,940	12,000
25.	(Turkey) Fenerbahçe Ülker	5	7,200	12,500
26.	(Belgium) Spirou Charleroi*	1	6,000	7,560
27.	(Greece) Aris*	1	5,000	5,500
28.	(Italy) Benetton Treviso*	2	4,867	5,134
29.	(France) Le Mans Sarthe*	1	4,600	6,003
30.	(Latvia) Ventspils*	1	3,500	12,500
TOTALS*			TOTAL LEAGUE ATTENDANCE; 990,599	AVERAGE ARENA CAPACITY; 9,552
