= 2011–12 KK Crvena zvezda season =

KK Crvena zvezda
2011–12 season
- President: (Serbia) Nebojša Čović
- Head coach: (Serbia) Svetislav Pešić
- Basketball League of Serbia: Runners-up
- Adriatic League: 10th
- Kup Radivoja Koraća: Runners-up
- Scoring leader: Adam Morrison (15.5 ppg)
- Highest home attendance: 6,000 (vs Zagreb, February 24, 2012 vs Radnički Kragujevac, May 29, 2012 vs Partizan, June 8, 2012)
- Lowest home attendance: 1,000 (vs Mega Vizura, April 4, 2012 vs Radnički FMP, April 12, 2012)
- Average home attendance: 3,326

In the 2011–12 season, KK Crvena zvezda competed in the Basketball League of Serbia, Kup Radivoja Koraća and Adriatic League.

== Players ==
=== Current roster ===
Crvena zvezda roster
Players
Coaches

Pos.	No.	Nat.	Name	Ht.	Wt.	Age
PG	4	(Serbia)	Čović, Filip	1.78 m (5 ft 10 in)	80 kg (176 lb)	37 – 5 June 1989
PG	5	(Serbia)	Cvetković, Aleksandar	1.83 m (6 ft 0 in)	77 kg (170 lb)	32 – 12 September 1993
PF	7	(Serbia)	Marković, Nikola	2.07 m (6 ft 9 in)	97 kg (214 lb)	37 – 7 July 1989
C	9	(Serbia)	Ilić, Mile	2.16 m (7 ft 1 in)	116 kg (256 lb)	42 – 2 June 1984
SG	10	(Serbia)	Lazić, Branko	1.95 m (6 ft 5 in)	87 kg (192 lb)	37 – 12 January 1989
G	11	(Serbia)	Nedović, Nemanja	1.93 m (6 ft 4 in)	88 kg (194 lb)	35 – 16 June 1991
F	15	(Serbia)	Lešić, Sava	2.03 m (6 ft 8 in)	95 kg (209 lb)	38 – 23 February 1988
F/C	17	(Serbia)	Subotić, Bojan	2.03 m (6 ft 8 in)	100 kg (220 lb)	35 – 17 December 1990
G	18	(Serbia)	Radivojević, Vuk	1.96 m (6 ft 5 in)	90 kg (198 lb)	43 – 30 July 1983
F/C	19	(Serbia)	Nikolić, Uroš	2.07 m (6 ft 9 in)	94 kg (207 lb)	39 – 25 April 1987
SG	20	(Serbia)	Vasić, Nikola (injured)	1.94 m (6 ft 4 in)	85 kg (187 lb)	41 – 15 September 1984
PF	22	(Serbia)	Radetić, Bojan (injured)	2.03 m (6 ft 8 in)	96 kg (212 lb)	38 – 19 August 1988
F	33	(United States)	Thomas, Omar	1.96 m (6 ft 5 in)	101 kg (223 lb)	44 – 25 February 1982
G/F	35	(Serbia)	Milutinović, Andreja	1.98 m (6 ft 6 in)	86 kg (190 lb)	36 – 6 August 1990
PG	40	(Serbia)	Popović, Bojan	1.91 m (6 ft 3 in)	86 kg (190 lb)	43 – 13 February 1983
C	55	(Serbia)	Popović, Petar	2.11 m (6 ft 11 in)	106 kg (234 lb)	47 – 28 June 1979

Head coach

- (Serbia) Svetislav Pešić

Assistant coach(es)

- (Serbia) Milivoje Lazić
- (Serbia) Saša Kosović
- (Serbia) Nikola Birač

Strength & conditioning coach(es)

- (Serbia) Aleksandar Lukman

Physiotherapist(s)

- (Serbia) Milorad Ćirić

Legend

- (C) Team captain
- Injured

- Roster
Updated: December 14, 2011

=== Depth chart ===
Pos.	Starting 5	Bench 1	Bench 2	Reserves	Injured
C	Petar Popović	Mile Ilić		Uroš Nikolić
PF	Bojan Subotić	Sava Lešić		Nikola Marković	Bojan Radetić
SF	Omar Thomas	Branko Lazić
SG	Andreja Milutinović	Nemanja Nedović	Vuk Radivojević		Nikola Vasić
PG	Bojan Popović	Filip Čović	Aleksandar Cvetković

=== Roster changes ===
==== In ====
- (Serbia) Filip Čović (from FMP Železnik)
- (Serbia) Nikola Marković (from FMP Železnik)
- (Serbia) Mile Ilić (from FMP Železnik)
- (Serbia) Branko Lazić (from FMP Železnik)
- (Serbia) Bojan Subotić (from FMP Železnik)
- (Serbia) Bojan Radetić (from FMP Železnik)
- (Serbia) Andreja Milutinović (from FMP Železnik)
- (Serbia) Vuk Radivojević (from FMP Železnik)
- (Serbia) Petar Popović (from (Russia) Spartak Saint Petersburg)
- (United States) Adam Morrison (was free agent during 2010–11 season)
- (Serbia) Bojan Popović (from (Spain) Lucentum Alicante)
- (Serbia) Nikola Vasić (was free agent during 2010–11 season)
- (United States) Omar Thomas (from (Italy) Sidigas Avellino)

==== Out ====
- (United States) Ricardo Marsh (to (Turkey) Hacettepe)
- (Serbia) Strahinja Milošević (to (Serbia) KK Vojvodina)
- (Serbia) Lazar Radosavljević (to (Montenegro) Mornar)
- (Serbia) Luka Drča (to OKK Beograd)
- (Serbia) Darko Balaban (to Smederevo 1953)
- (Serbia) Ivan Marinković (to Partizan)
- (Montenegro) Boris Bakić (to Radnički Kragujevac)
- (United States) Adam Morrison (to (Turkey) Beşiktaş)

=== Statistics ===
Legend
GP	Games played	GS	Games started	MPG	Minutes per game
FG%	Field-goal percentage	3FG%	3-point field-goal percentage	FT%	Free-throw percentage
RPG	Rebounds per game	APG	Assists per game	SPG	Steals per game
BPG	Blocks per game	PPG	Points per game	PIR	PIR per game

==== Adriatic League ====
#	Player	GP	GS	MPG	FG%	3FG%	FT%	RPG	APG	SPG	BPG	PPG	PIR
4	(Serbia) Filip Čović	24		18.01	.463	.208	.742	1.4	3.2	0.7	0.0	4.8	6.6
5	(Serbia) Aleksandar Cvetković	13	3	8.16	.474	.500	.667	1.0	1.2	0.2	0.0	3.2	3.0
7	(Serbia) Nikola Marković	8	1	10.20	.286	.333	.667	1.4	0.0	0.4	0.0	2.5	1.3
9	(Serbia) Mile Ilić	21	3	14.42	.514	.000	.833	3.7	0.7	0.5	0.9	6.7	7.9
10	(Serbia) Branko Lazić	24	13	15.43	.447	.333	.688	1.2	0.5	0.7	0.1	3.6	1.2
11	(Serbia) Nemanja Nedović	22	2	17.45	.548	.216	.724	1.4	1.5	0.6	0.0	6.7	4.7
15	(Serbia) Sava Lešić	23	3	19.31	.589	.289	.744	4.4	0.4	0.3	0.1	9.5	10.2
17	(Serbia) Bojan Subotić	25	21	19.03	.562	.429	.692	3.9	0.6	0.8	0.2	8.0	8.6
19	(Serbia) Uroš Nikolić	13		9.06	.459		.619	2.1	0.1	0.0	0.1	3.6	2.5
20	(Serbia) Nikola Vasić	6	1	17.32	.375	.429	.800	0.5	1.2	0.5	0.2	6.2	2.7
22	(Serbia) Bojan Radetić	4	2	16.45	.667	.308	.667	2.3	0.3	0.8	0.3	8.0	6.5
33	(United States) Omar Thomas	14	10	27.00	.468	.333	.769	5.2	1.3	1.1	0.1	12.2	12.5
35	(Serbia) Andreja Milutinović	26	19	25.16	.526	.351	.669	3.6	1.2	1.2	0.0	9.5	10.2
40	(Serbia) Bojan Popović	24	23	20.33	.435	.314	.792	2.3	3.5	1.1	0.1	7.0	9.5
55	(Serbia) Petar Popović	25	22	20.49	.544	.000	.772	5.3	0.8	0.0	0.0	11.2	10.2
	(United States) Adam Morrison^{1}	8	7	29.18	.507	.391	.875	3.1	1.5	0.6	0.1	15.5	13.9

Updated: 18 March 2012

1 Stats with Crvena zvezda (partial season).

==== Basketball League of Serbia ====
#	Player	GP	GS	MPG	FG%	3FG%	FT%	RPG	APG	SPG	BPG	PPG	PIR
4	(Serbia) Filip Čović	16	0	13.30	.310	.300	.640	0.7	2.8	0.9	0.0	3.8	4.3
5	(Serbia) Aleksandar Cvetković	7	1	10.00	.550	.670	.650	1.1	1.0	0.1	0.0	6.1	6.0
7	(Serbia) Nikola Marković	6	3	16.80	.650	.270	.250	5.3	0.7	0.2	0.3	7.5	8.0
9	(Serbia) Mile Ilić	19	0	14.60	.550	.000	.590	4.5	0.3	0.3	0.5	6.6	7.3
10	(Serbia) Branko Lazić	21	11	13.90	.330	.340	.880	1.6	0.3	0.5	0.0	3.9	0.9
11	(Serbia) Nemanja Nedović	19	3	13.70	.520	.290	.680	1.2	1.2	0.7	0.1	5.9	4.9
15	(Serbia) Sava Lešić	21	2	20.00	.560	.180	.740	5.1	0.7	0.8	0.0	7.0	8.9
17	(Serbia) Bojan Subotić	19	16	17.30	.670	.200	.740	3.4	0.4	0.8	0.1	6.0	7.2
18	(Serbia) Vuk Radivojević	12	2	14.50	.580	.200	.750	1.9	2.2	0.8	0.0	4.3	4.8
19	(Serbia) Uroš Nikolić	14	0	8.60	.470		.880	1.6	0.0	0.2	0.3	3.1	2.5
20	(Serbia) Nikola Vasić	0	0	00.00				0.0	0.0	0.0	0.0	0.0	0.0
22	(Serbia) Bojan Radetić	0	0	00.00				0.0	0.0	0.0	0.0	0.0	0.0
33	(United States) Omar Thomas	21	17	27.70	.520	.260	.790	5.4	1.7	1.3	0.1	13.9	15.0
35	(Serbia) Andreja Milutinović	21	11	22.80	.470	.300	.700	3.3	0.9	1.1	0.3	7.6	7.8
40	(Serbia) Bojan Popović	21	18	22.40	.440	.260	.770	2.2	4.1	1.3	0.0	7.8	9.9
55	(Serbia) Petar Popović	21	21	20.80	.550	.000	.590	3.9	0.8	0.3	0.0	11.1	8.6

Updated: 15 June 2012

==== Awards ====
Liga ABA Weekly MVP

Week	Player	Efficiency
12	(Serbia) Petar Popović	38
17	(United States) Omar Thomas	28

Basketball League of Serbia Weekly MVP

Week	Player	Efficiency
Play off game 2	(United States) Omar Thomas	33
Play off game 3	(United States) Omar Thomas	21
Play off game 4	(United States) Omar Thomas	26
Play off game 5	(United States) Omar Thomas	21
Play off game 7	(United States) Omar Thomas	24

Basketball League of Serbia Finals MVP – (United States) Omar Thomas
Basketball League of Serbia Finals Best Scorer – (United States) Omar Thomas
Radivoj Korać Cup Best Scorer – (Serbia) Mile Ilić

== Competitions ==
=== Adriatic League ===
==== Standings ====
	Team	Pld	W	L	PF	PA	Diff
8	(Serbia) Radnički	26	12	14	2106	2124	−18
9	Zagreb Croatia osiguranje	26	12	14	2007	2118	−111
10	(Serbia) Crvena Zvezda DIVA	26	11	15	2074	2091	−17
11	(Slovenia) Krka	26	9	17	1893	1988	−95
12	(Serbia) Hemofarm STADA	26	7	19	1868	2076	−208

Qualified for Final four
Relegated

Pld - Played; W - Won; L - Lost; PF - Points for; PA - Points against; Diff - Difference; Pts - Points.

As of 18 March 2012

==== Matches ====
8 October 2011
18:15 CET

Report

Crvena zvezda (Serbia)	104–89	(Serbia) Hemofarm
Scoring by quarter: 26–20, 34–20, 24–23, 20–26
Pts: Morrison 23; Rebs: P. Popović 9 Asts: Čović 6		Pts: Jeremić 23; Rebs: Savović 7 Asts: Otašević, Nešović 4

Pionir Hall
Belgrade, Serbia
Attendance: 3,500
Referees: Srđan Dožai (CRO), Zoran Šutulović (MNE), Tomislav Vovk (CRO)

11 October 2011
18:00 CET

Report

Budućnost (Montenegro)	79–64	(Serbia) Crvena zvezda
Scoring by quarter: 17–23, 22–23, 28–5, 12–13
Pts: Vučević 16; Rebs: Vučević 18; Asts: A. Popović, Anderson 3		Pts: Subotić 15; Rebs: P. Popović 7 Asts: Čović 4

Morača Sports Center
Podgorica, Montenegro
Attendance: 3,500
Referees: Sašo Pukl (SLO), Andrej Jeršan (SLO), Sašo Petek (SLO)

15 October 2011
17:00 CET

Report

Crvena zvezda (Serbia)	93–101	(Slovenia) Olimpija
Scoring by quarter: 34–34, 22–27, 26–17, 11–23
Pts: Morrison 30; Rebs: Ilić 8 Asts: Morrison, B. Popović 3		Pts: Salin 23; Rebs: Jagodnik 5 Asts: Green 6

Pionir Hall
Belgrade, Serbia
Attendance: 3,400
Referees: Dubravko Muhvić (CRO), Ademir Zurapović (BIH), Dragan Kralj (BIH)

21 October 2011
20:00 CET

Report

Crvena zvezda (Serbia)	90–91	(Croatia) Cedevita
Scoring by quarter: 18–12, 24–28, 19–28, 29–23
Pts: Nedović 17; Rebs: Subotić 10; Asts: Čović 7		Pts: Warren 24; Rebs: Bilan 7 Asts: Car 4

Pionir Hall
Belgrade, Serbia
Attendance: 4,000
Referees: Sašo Pukl (SLO), Andrej Jeršan (SLO), Matej Špendl (SLO)

29 October 2011
21:00 CET

Report

Crvena zvezda (Serbia)	104–64	(Slovenia) Zlatorog Laško
Scoring by quarter: 27–10, 24–20, 30–15, 23–19
Pts: Morrison 23; Rebs: Milutinović 6 Asts: B. Popović 6		Pts: Lapornik 14; Rebs: Škifić, Omić 4 Asts: Vujasinović 5

Pionir Hall
Belgrade, Serbia
Attendance: 3,000
Referees: Ademir Zurapović (BIH), Petar Obradović (BIH), Aleksandar Milojević (MKD)

5 November 2011
20:00 CET

Report

Zagreb (Croatia)	102–85	(Serbia) Crvena zvezda
Scoring by quarter: 33–19, 31–19, 14–21, 24–26
Pts: May 24; Rebs: May 8 Asts: Simon 10		Pts: Morrison 27; Rebs: Subotić 7 Asts: Čović 7

Dražen Petrović Basketball Hall
Zagreb, Croatia
Attendance: 1,500
Referees: Matej Boltauzer (SLO), Damir Javor (SLO), Zdravko Rutešić (MNE)

13 November 2011
18:00 CET

Report

Helios Domžale (Slovenia)	88–79	(Serbia) Crvena zvezda
Scoring by quarter: 27–23, 16–18, 19–17, 26–21
Pts: Pašalić 23; Rebs: Pašalić 8 Asts: Four players 4		Pts: Lešić 20; Rebs: Lešić 6 Asts: Three players 2

Hala Komunalnega centra
Domžale, Slovenia
Attendance: 1,500
Referees: Sreten Radović (CRO), Siniša Herceg (CRO), Petar Obradović (BIH)

19 November 2011
17:00 CET

Report

Crvena zvezda (Serbia)	79–84	(Serbia) Radnički Kragujevac
Scoring by quarter: 24–27, 23–15, 17–20, 15–22
Pts: Milutinović 16; Rebs: Subotić 7 Asts: B. Popović 10		Pts: Scott 28; Rebs: Scott 6 Asts: Marković 14

Pionir Hall
Belgrade, Serbia
Attendance: 3,000
Referees: Srđan Dožai (CRO), Matej Špendl (SLO), Mario Majkić (SLO)

26 November 2011
18:00 CET

Report

Krka (Slovenia)	75–73	(Serbia) Crvena zvezda
Scoring by quarter: 13–17, 21–18, 22–16, 19–22
Pts: Balažič 18; Rebs: Balažič 11; Asts: Krivec, Baxter 3		Pts: Nedović, P. Popović 17; Rebs: Lešić 8 Asts: Čović 4

Leon Štukelj Hall
Novo Mesto, Slovenia
Attendance: 1,200
Referees: Sreten Radović (CRO), Tonči Anzulović (CRO), Josip Radojković (CRO)

3 December 2011
18:00 CET

Report

Crvena zvezda (Serbia)	76–83	(Israel) Maccabi Tel Aviv
Scoring by quarter: 17–25, 19–16, 23–25, 17–17
Pts: P. Popović 17; Rebs: P. Popović 8 Asts: Čović 6		Pts: Schortsanitis 19; Rebs: Smith, Scheyer 5 Asts: Ohayon 5

Pionir Hall
Belgrade, Serbia
Attendance: 4,000
Referees: Damir Javor (SLO), Andrej Jeršan (SLO), Aleksandar Milojević (MKD)

9 December 2011
20:00 CET

Report

Cibona (Croatia)	87–73	(Serbia) Crvena zvezda
Scoring by quarter: 22–17, 30–16, 19–20, 16–20
Pts: Zubčić 14; Rebs: Rozić 6 Asts: Kus 4		Pts: Subotić 11; Rebs: Nikolić 6 Asts: Milutinović 3

Dražen Petrović Basketball Hall
Zagreb, Croatia
Attendance: 1,500
Referees: Sreten Radović (CRO), Tonči Anzulović (CRO), Josip Radojković (CRO)

16 December 2011
19:00 CET

Report

Crvena zvezda (Serbia)	83–72	(Bosnia and Herzegovina) Široki TT Kabeli
Scoring by quarter: 28–18, 19–21, 15–25, 21–8
Pts: P. Popović 23; Rebs: P. Popović 14; Asts: B. Popović 4		Pts: Prilepić 18; Rebs: Planinić, Šakić 5 Asts: Vladović 11

Pionir Hall
Belgrade, Serbia
Attendance: 2,000
Referees: Roman Kolar (SLO), Nikola Lepetić (MNE), Mario Majkić (SLO)

25 December 2011
20:00 CET

Report

Partizan (Serbia)	85–67	(Serbia) Crvena zvezda
Scoring by quarter: 16–22, 27–14, 19–15, 23–16
Pts: Milosavljević 23; Rebs: Čakarević 10; Asts: Law 5		Pts: Thomas 12; Rebs: P. Popović 9 Asts: Čović 5

Pionir Hall
Belgrade, Serbia
Attendance: 4,500
Referees: Srđan Dožai (CRO), Milija Vojinović (SRB), Tonči Anzulović (CRO)

5 January 2012
18:00 CET

Report

Hemofarm (Serbia)	73–81	(Serbia) Crvena zvezda
Scoring by quarter: 23–13, 23–23, 13–19, 14–26
Pts: Jeremić 21; Rebs: Savović 13; Asts: Savović 5		Pts: P. Popović 16; Rebs: Lešić 8 Asts: Milutinović 5

Millennium Center
Vršac, Serbia
Attendance: 2,000
Referees: Saša Maričić (SRB), Roman Kolar (SLO), Josip Radojković (CRO)

10 January 2012
20:00 CET

Report

Crvena zvezda (Serbia)	63–57	(Montenegro) Budućnost
Scoring by quarter: 19–10, 11–12, 18–18, 15–17
Pts: Lešić 13; Rebs: Three players 5 Asts: Čović 5		Pts: Anderson 15; Rebs: Three players 6 Asts: Mihailović 2

Železnik Hall
Belgrade, Serbia
Attendance: 3,000
Referees: Dubravko Muhvić (CRO), Aleksandar Milojević (MKD), Mario Majkić (SLO)

15 January 2012
29:00 CET

Report

Olimpija (Slovenia)	74–73	(Serbia) Crvena zvezda
Scoring by quarter: 20–18, 14–16, 25–17, 15–22
Pts: Salin 20; Rebs: Murić 7 Asts: Jeretin 8		Pts: P. Popović 25; Rebs: P. Popović 10; Asts: B. Popović 4

Arena Stožice
Maribor, Slovenia
Attendance: 2,000
Referees: Siniša Herceg (CRO), Nikola Lepetić (MNE), Ademir Zurapović (BIH)

20 January 2012
20:00 CET

Report

Zlatorog Laško (Slovenia)	56–70	(Serbia) Crvena zvezda
Scoring by quarter: 13–12, 14–20, 17–24, 12–14
Pts: Škifić 16; Rebs: Omić 8 Asts: Lapornik 3		Pts: Milutinović 15; Rebs: Subotić, Thomas 5 Asts: B. Popović 3

Tri Lilije Hall
Laško, Slovenia
Attendance: 1,000
Referees: Sreten Radović (CRO), Tomislav Vovk (CRO), Josip Radojković (CRO)

4 February 2012
17:00 CET

Report

Radnički Kragujevac (Serbia)	86–90	(Serbia) Crvena zvezda
Scoring by quarter: 21–21, 21–18, 19–26, 25–25
Pts: Scott 20; Rebs: Sinovec, Simon 8 Asts: Marković 5		Pts: Thomas 17; Rebs: P. Popović 7 Asts: B. Popović 6

Hala Jezero
Kragujevac, Serbia
Attendance: 3,500
Referees: Sašo Pukl (SLO), Dragan Nešković (SRB), Matej Špendl (SLO)

8 February 2012
20:00 CET

Report

Cedevita (Croatia)	96–91	(Serbia) Crvena zvezda
Scoring by quarter: 18–17, 24–28, 24–18, 30–28
Pts: Vukušić 20; Rebs: Bilan 7 Asts: Baždarić 4		Pts: Thomas 23; Rebs: Thomas 10; Asts: Milutinović, B. Popović 3

Dom Sportova
Zagreb, Croatia
Attendance: 3,000
Referees: Damir Javor (SLO), Nikola Lepetić (MNE), Dragan Kralj (BIH)

12 February 2012
17:00 CET

Report

Crvena zvezda (Serbia)	86–69	(Slovenia) Helios Domžale
Scoring by quarter: 20–14, 24–18, 26–17, 16–20
Pts: Thomas 15; Rebs: Subotić 5 Asts: B. Popović 3		Pts: Gay 20; Rebs: Bubnić 8 Asts: Petrović 5

Pionir Hall
Belgrade, Serbia
Attendance: 3,900
Referees: Srđan Dožai (CRO), Siniša Herceg (CRO), Alfred Jovović (CRO)

24 February 2012
20:30 CET

Report

Crvena zvezda (Serbia)	87–74	(Croatia) Zagreb
Scoring by quarter: 25–23, 25–20, 14–16, 23–15
Pts: P. Popović 17; Rebs: Lešić 8 Asts: Thomas, B. Popović 3		Pts: Kasun 31; Rebs: Kasun 10; Asts: Mulaomerović 7

Pionir Hall
Belgrade, Serbia
Attendance: 6,000
Referees: Zoran Šutulović (MNE), Radomir Vojinović (MNE), Igor Dragojević (MNE)

29 February 2012
17:00 CET

Report

Široki TT Kabeli (Bosnia and Herzegovina)	76–66	(Serbia) Crvena zvezda
Scoring by quarter: 17–13, 17–15, 22–14, 20–24
Pts: Planinić 20; Rebs: Planinić 12; Asts: Vladović 7		Pts: Thomas 15; Rebs: Subotić 6 Asts: B. Popović 5

Pecara
Široki Brijeg, Bosnia and Herzegovina
Attendance: 2,500
Referees: Zoran Šutulović (MNE), Igor Dragojević (MNE), Mario Majkić (SLO)

3 March 2012
20:00 CET

Report

Crvena zvezda (Serbia)	82–78	(Slovenia) Krka
Scoring by quarter: 16–21, 19–17, 25–21, 22–19
Pts: B. Popović 19; Rebs: P. Popović 9 Asts: B. Popović 4		Pts: Dragić 19; Rebs: Pavič 6 Asts: Dragić 4

Pionir Hall
Belgrade, Serbia
Attendance: 3,500
Referees: Dubravko Muhvić (CRO), Tonči Anzulović (CRO), Tomislav Hordov (CRO)

10 March 2012
17:00 CET

report

Crvena zvezda (Serbia)	80–67	(Croatia) Cibona
Scoring by quarter: 17–18, 26–16, 20–15, 17–18
Pts: Thomas 17; Rebs: Thomas 11; Asts: B. Popović 4		Pts: Barbour 13; Rebs: Rozić 6 Asts: El-Amin 5

Pionir Hall
Belgrade, Serbia
Attendance: 3,500
Referees: Sašo Pukl (SLO), Matej Boltauzer (SLO), Mario Majkić (SLO)

15 March 2012
19:00 CET

Report

Maccabi Tel Aviv (Israel)	101–66	(Serbia) Crvena zvezda
Scoring by quarter: 26–13, 32–11, 18–17, 25–25
Pts: Schortsanitis, Langford 17; Rebs: Three players 4 Asts: Burstein 10		Pts: Lešić 14; Rebs: Ilić 10; Asts: Cvetković, Ilić 2

Yad Eliyahu Arena
Tel Aviv, Israel
Attendance: 4,000
Referees: Roman Kolar (SLO), Matej Boltauzer (SLO), Andrej Jeršan (SLO)

18 March 2012
20:15 CET

Report

Crvena zvezda (Serbia)	69–84	(Serbia) Partizan
Scoring by quarter: 14–17, 15–17, 17–24, 23–26
Pts: Thomas 16; Rebs: Subotić, Thomas 4 Asts: Čović, B. Popović 4		Pts: James 20; Rebs: Mačvan 14; Asts: James, Mačvan 4

Pionir Hall
Belgrade, Serbia
Attendance: 3,000
Referees: Dubravko Muhvić (CRO), Sreten Radović (CRO), Zoran Šutulović (MNE)

=== Basketball League of Serbia ===
==== Standings ====
Pos	Team	Total						
		P	W	L	F	A	D	Pts
1	Partizan mt:s	14	12	2	1196	976	+220	26
2	Radnički Kragujevac	14	10	4	1170	1134	+36	24
3	Crvena Zvezda DIVA	14	9	5	1137	1050	+87	23
4	Vojvodina Srbijagas	14	7	7	1158	1148	+10	21
5	Radnički FMP	14	5	9	1076	1154	–78	19

P=Matches played, W=Matches won, L=Matches lost, F=Points for, A=Points against, D=Points difference, Pts=Points

Qualification for Playoff Stage

As of 23 May 2012

==== Matches ====
23 March 2012
18:00

Report

Crvena zvezda DIVA	73–60	Hemofarm STADA
Scoring by quarter: 14–19, 19–11, 27–15, 13–15
Pts: P. Popović 19; Rebs: Marković 8 Asts: Čović 4		Pts: Jeremić 20; Rebs: Gagić 10; Asts: Mitrović 4

Pionir Hall
Belgrade, Serbia
Attendance: 2,000
Referees: Belosevic Ilija, Jevtovic Vladimir, Milovanovic Predrag

28 March 2012
20:00

Report

Crvena zvezda DIVA	91–77	Vojvodina Srbijagas
Scoring by quarter: 17–18, 24–15, 31–18, 19–26
Pts: Lešić 18; Rebs: Marković 11; Asts: Čović 4		Pts: Milošević 16; Rebs: Bunić 9 Asts: Dunđerski 7

Pionir Hall
Belgrade, Serbia
Attendance: 2,500
Referees: Obrknezevic Uros, Vorkapic Branko, Juras Jasmina

1 April 2012
18:00

Report

BKK Radnički	81–80	Crvena zvezda DIVA
Scoring by quarter: 19–17, 21–20, 22–25, 19–18
Pts: Kitanović 22; Rebs: Mijović 9 Asts: Boltić 9		Pts: Lešić 17; Rebs: Milutinović 11; Asts: Thomas 5

SC Šumice
Belgrade, Serbia
Attendance: 1,200
Referees: Jovcic Milivoje, Mrdak Branislav, Veskovic Vladimir

4 April 2012
19:00

Report

Crvena zvezda DIVA	92–91	Mega Vizura
Scoring by quarter: 14–27, 23–17, 26–25, 29–22
Pts: Thomas, P. Popović 22; Rebs: Ilić 7 Asts: B. Popović 11		Pts: Jaramaz 27; Rebs: Cvetković, Jaramaz 7 Asts: Jaramaz 5

Pionir Hall
Belgrade, Serbia
Attendance: 1,000
Referees: Maricic Sasa, Stefanovic Ivan, Milovanovic Predrag

7 April 2012
21:00

Report

Partizan m:ts	76–69	Crvena zvezda DIVA
Scoring by quarter: 21–19, 22–20, 12–17, 21–13
Pts: Milosavljević 15; Rebs: Mačvan 10; Asts: James 6		Pts: P. Popović 18; Rebs: Thomas 7 Asts: B. Popović 5

Pionir Hall
Belgrade, Serbia
Attendance: 5,000
Referees: Vojinovic Milija, Mrdak Branislav, Vorkapic Branko

12 April 2012
19:00

Report

Crvena zvezda DIVA	89–65	Radnički FMP
Scoring by quarter: 23–22, 20–19, 26–15, 20–9
Pts: Subotić 16; Rebs: Ilić 7 Asts: B. Popović 9		Pts: Smiljanić 15; Rebs: Džaković 6 Asts: Stamenković 6

Pionir Hall
Belgrade, Serbia
Attendance: 1,000
Referees: Jovcic Milivoje, Jevtovic Vladimir, Veskovic Vladimir

18 April 2012
18:00

Report

Radnički Kragujevac	80–68	Crvena zvezda DIVA
Scoring by quarter: 22–18, 16–20, 20–20, 22–10
Pts: Marković 21; Rebs: Scott 7 Asts: Pavković 8		Pts: Nedović 14; Rebs: Lešić 9 Asts: B. Popović 6

Hala Jezero
Kragujevac, Serbia
Attendance: 2,000
Referees: Juras Marko, Pecelj Marko, Mazic Milan

21 April 2012
19:00

Report

Hemofarm STADA	68–76	Crvena zvezda DIVA
Scoring by quarter: 11–24, 24–19, 18–22, 15–11
Pts: Gagić 13; Rebs: Jeremić 5 Asts: Otašević 4		Pts: Thomas 11; Rebs: Lešić 9 Asts: Popović 5

Millennium Center
Vršac, Serbia
Attendance: 1,000
Referees: Jovcic Milivoje, Mrdak Branislav, Veskovic Vladimir

26 April 2012
17:30

Report

Vojvodina Srbijagas	87–83	Crvena zvezda DIVA
Scoring by quarter: 17–25, 22–20, 23–23, 25–15
Pts: Marković 17; Rebs: Milošević 8 Asts: Milošević 4		Pts: Subotić 18; Rebs: Milutinović 5 Asts: Čović 5

Spens Sports Center
Novi Sad, Serbia
Attendance: 1,200
Referees: Belosevic Ilija, Jevtovic Vladimir, Mazic Milan

2 May 2012
19:00

Report

Mega Vizura	75–79	Crvena zvezda DIVA
Scoring by quarter: 25–25, 18–27, 11–12, 21–15
Pts: Three players 11; Rebs: Musli 18; Asts: Miljenović, Matović 4		Pts: P. Popović 26; Rebs: Lešić 8 Asts: B. Popović 9

Hala sportova
Belgrade, Serbia
Attendance: 1,500
Referees: Jovcic Milivoje, Jevtovic Vladimir, Milovanovic Predrag

9 May 2012
19:00

Report

Crvena zvezda DIVA	85–71	BKK Radnički
Scoring by quarter: 24–20, 19–21, 22–13, 20–17
Pts: Thomas 18; Rebs: Subotić 12; Asts: Čović 7		Pts: Petrović 22; Rebs: Petrović 7 Asts: Three players 5

Pionir Hall
Belgrade, Serbia
Attendance: 3,200
Referees: Jovcic Milivoje, Pecelj Marko, Vorkapic Branko

15 May 2012
20:00

Report

Crvena zvezda DIVA	78–83 (OT)	Partizan m:ts
Scoring by quarter: 12–17, 18–11, 23–24, 14–15, Overtime: 11–16
Pts: Thomas 25; Rebs: Ilić 8 Asts: B. Popović 4		Pts: Mačvan 21; Rebs: Mačvan 9 Asts: James 4

Pionir Hall
Belgrade, Serbia
Attendance: 4,000
Referees: Juras Marko, Glisic Aleksandar, Juras Jasmina

19 May 2012
18:00

Report

Radnički FMP	61–87	Crvena zvezda DIVA
Scoring by quarter: 11-14, 16-26, 11-20, 23-27
Pts: Milovanović 14; Rebs: Tubak, Milovanović 5 Asts: Stamenković, Dimić 3		Pts: Three players 12; Rebs: B. Popović, P. Popović 7 Asts: Radivojević, B. Popović 4

FMP Hall
Belgrade, Serbia
Attendance: 300
Referees: Neskovic Dragan, Jevtovic Vladimir, Mazic Milan

23 May 2012
19:00

Report

Crvena zvezda DIVA	87–75	Radnički Kragujevac
Scoring by quarter: 21–19, 22–30, 19–15, 25–11
Pts: Thomas 17; Rebs: Lešić 9 Asts: Radivojević 4		Pts: Four players 10; Rebs: Birčević 7 Asts: Three players 3

Pionir Hall
Belgrade, Serbia
Attendance: 2,000
Referees: Juras Marko, Obrknezevic Uros, Veskovic Vladimir

==== Semifinals ====
Game 1

27 May 2012
19:00

Report

Radnički Kragujevac	84–78	Crvena zvezda DIVA
Scoring by quarter: 32–18, 21–24, 17–18, 14–18
Pts: Simon 24; Rebs: Scott 9 Asts: Marković 6		Pts: P. Popović 15; Rebs: P. Popović 7 Asts: Radivojević 3
Radnički leads 1–0

Hala Jezero
Kragujevac, Serbia
Attendance: 3,500
Referees: Neskovic Dragan, Jevtovic Vladimir, Vorkapic Branko

Game 2

29 May 2012
18:00

Report

Crvena zvezda DIVA	76–62	Radnički Kragujevac
Scoring by quarter: 19–10, 20–14, 17–22, 20–16
Pts: Thomas 23; Rebs: Lešić 10; Asts: Thomas 5		Pts: Bakić, Mijatović 9 Rebs: Scott 8 Asts: Pavković 5
Series tied at 1–1

Pionir Hall
Belgrade, Serbia
Attendance: 6,000
Referees: Juras Marko, Maricic Sasa, Glisic Aleksandar

Game 3

1 June 2012
18:00

Report

Radnički Kragujevac	71–76	Crvena zvezda DIVA
Scoring by quarter: 17–15, 20–14, 15–27, 19–20
Pts: Bakić 15; Rebs: Bakić 6 Asts: Four players 3		Pts: Thomas 19; Rebs: Thomas 14; Asts: B. Popović 4
Crvena zvezda won 2–1

Hala Jezero
Kragujevac, Serbia
Attendance: 4,000
Referees: Belosevic Ilija, Stefanovic Ivan, Juras Jasmina

==== Final ====
Game 1

5 June 2012
20:00

Report

Partizan mt:s	92–83	Crvena zvezda DIVA
Scoring by quarter: 23–14, 22–21, 19–28, 28–20
Pts: Milosavljević 18; Rebs: Mačvan 9 Asts: James, Mačvan 5		Pts: Thomas 21; Rebs: Ilić 10; Asts: B. Popović, Thomas 3
Partizan leads 1–0

Pionir Hall
Belgrade, Serbia
Attendance: 6,000
Referees: Vojinovic Milija, Neskovic Dragan, Jevtovic Vladimir

Game 2

8 June 2012
20:00

Report

Crvena zvezda DIVA	68–56	Partizan mt:s
Scoring by quarter: 21–15, 21–13, 14–20, 12–8
Pts: Thomas 18; Rebs: Ilić 8 Asts: Radivojević, Thomas 2		Pts: Raduljica 17; Rebs: Raduljica 7 Asts: Mačvan 3
Series tied 1–1

Pionir Hall
Belgrade, Serbia
Attendance: 6,000
Referees: Jovcic Milivoje, Obrknezevic Uros, Mrdak Branislav

Game 3

12 June 2012
20:00

Report

Partizan mt:s	78–72	Crvena zvezda DIVA
Scoring by quarter: 18–16, 29–21, 15–11, 16–24
Pts: Lučić 19; Rebs: Lučić 6 Asts: Lučić 4		Pts: B. Popović 14; Rebs: Ilić, Subotić 5 Asts: Čović 3
Partizan leads 2–1

Pionir Hall
Belgrade, Serbia
Attendance: 7,000
Referees: Belosevic Ilija, Juras Marko, Maricic Sasa

Game 4

15 June 2012
20:00

Report

Crvena zvezda DIVA	82–86	Partizan mt:s
Scoring by quarter: 21–28, 21–20, 18–17, 22–21
Pts: Thomas 23; Rebs: Lešić 5 Asts: B. Popović 6		Pts: Mačvan 19; Rebs: Mačvan 8 Asts: James 7
Partizan won 3–1

FMP Hall
Belgrade, Serbia
Attendance: 3,000
Referees: Vojinovic Milija, Neskovic Dragan, Jevtovic Vladimir

=== Kup Radivoja Koraća ===
Quarterfinals

17 February 2012
18:00 CET

Report

Crvena zvezda	88–74	BKK Radnički
Scoring by quarter: 31–18, 25–17, 18–14, 14–25
Pts: Milutinović 20; Rebs: P. Popović 8 Asts: Nedović 4		Pts: Tomić 15; Rebs: Kitanović 7 Asts: Osmokrović, Boltić 6

Čair Sports Center
Niš, Serbia
Attendance: 3,000
Referees: Časlav Čukalović, Pecelj Marko, Arsenijević Radoš

Semifinals

18 February 2012
20:30 CET

Report

Crvena zvezda	71–65	Hemofarm
Scoring by quarter: 26–14, 20–9, 12–17, 13–25
Pts: B. Popović 15; Rebs: Subotić 9 Asts: Čović 5		Pts: Gagić 14; Rebs: Pantić 6 Asts: Šutalo, Pantić 3

Čair Sports Center
Niš, Serbia
Attendance: 3,000
Referees: Saša Maričić, Uroš Obrknežević, Ivan Stefanović

Final

19 February 2012
20:30 CET

Report

Partizan	64–51	Crvena zvezda
Scoring by quarter: 17–14, 15–13, 15–15, 17–9
Pts: Lučić 11; Rebs: Čakarević 8 Asts: Three players 2		Pts: Three players 12; Rebs: Thomas 6 Asts: B. Popović 3

Čair Sports Center
Niš, Serbia
Attendance: 4,000
Referees: Ilija Belošević, Milija Vojinović, Dragan Nešković
