= 2011–12 Radivoj Korać Cup =

Basketball league season in Serbia

2012 Radivoj Korać Cup
- Season: 2011–12
- Duration: 16–19 February 2012
- Teams: 8

Regular season
- Season MVP: (Serbia) Danilo Anđušić

Finals
- Champions: Partizan mt:s (13th title)
- Runners-up: Crvena zvezda DIVA

Awards
- Top Scorer: (Serbia) Mile Ilić

The 2012 Radivoj Korać Cup was the 10th season of the Serbian national basketball cup tournament. The Žućko's left trophy awarded to the winner Partizan from Belgrade.

== Venue ==
Niš	2011–12 Radivoj Korać Cup (Serbia)
Čair Sports Center	2011–12 Radivoj Korać Cup (Serbia)
Capacity: 4,500	2011–12 Radivoj Korać Cup (Serbia)

== Qualified teams ==
Adriatic League	Basketball League of Serbia	Cup of Serbia (2nd-tier)
Crvena zvezda DIVA; Hemofarm STADA; Partizan mt:s Radnički Kragujevac	Vojvodina Srbijagas (1st)^{A} Radnički Belgrade (2nd)^{A}	Radnički FMP (Winner)

^{A} League table position after 13 rounds played

== Bracket ==
Quarterfinals
16 February
Partizan mt:s	96
Mega Vizura	69
16 February
Radnički Kragujevac	77
Vojvodina Srbijagas	75
17 February
Crvena zvezda DIVA	88
Radnički Belgrade	74
17 February
Hemofarm STADA	84
Radnički FMP	58

Semifinals
18 February
Partizan mt:s	96
Radnički Kragujevac	75
18 February
Crvena zvezda DIVA	71
Hemofarm STADA	65

Final
19 February
Partizan mt:s	64
Crvena zvezda DIVA	51

== Quarterfinals ==
16 February 2012
18:00

Boxscore

Partizan mt:s	98–69	Mega Vizura
Scoring by quarter: 16–20, 24–14, 29–18, 29–17
Pts: Raduljica 16; Rebs: Čakarević 9 Asts: Kecman, James 6		Pts: Miljenović 19; Rebs: three players 4 Asts: Miljenović 5

Čair Sports Center, Niš
Attendance: 3,400
Referees: Aleksandar Glišić, Milan Mažić, Slavimir Štosović

16 February 2012
20:30

Boxscore

Radnički Kragujevac	77–75	Vojvodina Srbijagas
Scoring by quarter: 26–19, 17–22, 19–14, 15–20
Pts: Simon 17; Rebs: Birčević 6 Asts: Marković 6		Pts: Milošević 16; Rebs: Dunđerski, Zeković 6 Asts: Dunđerski 6

Čair Sports Center, Niš
Attendance: 1,250
Referees: Branko Vorkapić, Vladimir Vesković, Predrag Milovanović

17 February 2012
18:00

Boxscore

Crvena zvezda DIVA	88–74	Radnički Belgrade
Scoring by quarter: 31–18, 25–17, 18–14, 14–25
Pts: Milutinović 20; Rebs: P. Popović 8 Asts: Nedović 4		Pts: Tomić 15; Rebs: Kitanović 7 Asts: Boltić, Osmokrović 6

Čair Sports Center, Niš
Attendance: 3,400
Referees: Časlav Čukalović, Marko Pecelj, Radoš Arsenijević

17 February 2012
20:30

Boxscore

Hemofarm STADA	84–58	Radnički FMP
Scoring by quarter: 27–17, 18–18, 25–10, 14–13
Pts: Šutalo 17; Rebs: Mitrović 8 Asts: Nešović 4		Pts: Stojadinović 16; Rebs: Tubak 8 Asts: Stamenković 8

Čair Sports Center, Niš
Attendance: 1,200
Referees: Jasmina Juras, Miodrag Ličina, Milorad Milojković

== Semifinals ==
18 February 2012
18:00

Boxscore

Partizan mt:s	96–75	Radnički Kragujevac
Scoring by quarter: 19–25, 23–18, 25–11, 29–21
Pts: James 17; Rebs: Katić 11; Asts: James 5		Pts: three players 14; Rebs: Birčević, Sinovec 4 Asts: Marković, Pavković 3

Čair Sports Center, Niš
Attendance: 4,200
Referees: Marko Juras, Milivoje Jovčić, Branislav Mrdak

18 February 2012
20:30

Boxscore

Crvena zvezda DIVA	71–65	Hemofarm STADA
Scoring by quarter: 26–14, 20–9, 12–17, 13–25
Pts: B. Popović 15; Rebs: Subotić 9 Asts: Čović 5		Pts: Gagić 14; Rebs: Pantić 6 Asts: Pantić, Šutalo 3

Čair Sports Center, Niš
Attendance: 4,200
Referees: Saša Maričić, Uroš Obrknežević, Ivan Stefanović

== Final ==
19 February 2012
20:30

Boxscore

Partizan mt:s	64–51	Crvena zvezda DIVA
Scoring by quarter: 17–14, 15–13, 15–15, 17–9
Pts: Lučić 11; Rebs: Čakarević 8 Asts: three players 2		Pts: three players 12; Rebs: Thomas 6 Asts: B. Popović 3

Čair Sports Center, Niš
Attendance: 4,400
Referees: Ilija Belošević, Milija Vojinović, Dragan Nešković

Radivoj Korać Cup 2012 Champions

Partizan
13th Cup

== See also ==
- 2011–12 ABA League
- 2011–12 Basketball League of Serbia
- 2011–12 Basketball Cup of Serbia
- 2011–12 KK Crvena zvezda season
- 2011–12 KK Partizan season
