= 2011–12 ABA League =

2011–12 ABA League season
- League: Adriatic League
- Sport: Basketball
- Duration: 8 October 2011 – 30 April 2012
- Games: 185
- Teams: Serbia (4 teams); Slovenia (4 teams); Croatia (3 teams); Bosnia and Herzegovina (1 team); Montenegro (1 team); Israel (1 team)
- TV partner(s): TV Slovenija, TV Koper, Šport TV, HRT, RTCG, TV B92, Arena Sport

Regular season
- Season champions: (Israel) Maccabi Tel Aviv
- Season MVP: (United States) David Simon (Radnički)
- Top scorer: (United States) David Simon (Radnički) (19.38 ppg)

Final four
- Champions: (Israel) Maccabi Tel Aviv
- Runners-up: (Croatia) KK Cedevita
- Finals MVP: (United States) Keith Langford (Maccabi)

ABA League seasons
- ← 2010–11 2012–13 →

The 2011–12 ABA League was the 11th season of the Adriatic League, with 14 teams from Serbia, Slovenia, Montenegro, Croatia, Bosnia and Herzegovina and Israel participating in it. This was the second time a team from Israel, Maccabi Tel Aviv, participated in the league.

2011–12 ABA League Final Four was held in Yad Eliyahu Arena, Tel Aviv.

== Team information ==
=== Venues and locations ===
Country	Teams	Team	City	Venue (Capacity)
Serbia	4			
Serbia	4	Partizan mt:s	Belgrade	Pionir Hall (8,150)
Serbia	4	Hemofarm STADA	Vršac	Millennium Centar (5,000)
Serbia	4	Radnički	Kragujevac	Hala Jezero (5,320)
Serbia	4	Crvena zvezda BG DIVA	Belgrade	Pionir Hall (8,150)
Slovenia	4			
Slovenia	4	Union Olimpija	Ljubljana	Arena Stožice (12,480)
Slovenia	4	Krka	Novo mesto	Leon Štukelj Hall (2,000)
Slovenia	4	Helios Domžale	Domžale	Komunalni center Hall (2,000)
Slovenia	4	Zlatorog Laško	Laško	Tri Lilije Hall (2,500)
Croatia	3			
Croatia	3	Zagreb CO	Zagreb	Dražen Petrović Basketball Hall (5,400)
Croatia	3	Cedevita	Zagreb	Dom Sportova – Dvorana 2 (3,100)
Croatia	3	Cibona	Zagreb	Dražen Petrović Basketball Hall (5,400)
Bosnia and Herzegovina	1	Široki WWin	Široki Brijeg	"Pecara" (4,500)
Montenegro	1	Budućnost VOLI	Podgorica	Morača Sports Center (4,570)
Israel	1	Maccabi Electra Tel Aviv	Tel Aviv	Yad Eliyahu Arena (10,383)

Location of teams in the ABA NLB League 2010–11
Location of teams in the 2011–12 ABA League

=== Head coaches ===
Team	Head coach	Seasons as head coach
Budućnost VOLI	(Montenegro) Dejan Radonjić	7
Cedevita	(Croatia) Dražen Anzulović	1
Cibona	(Croatia) Jasmin Repeša	1
Zlatorog Laško	(Slovenia) Rado Trifunović	2
Hemofarm STADA	(Serbia) Nebojša Bogavac	1
Helios Domžale	(Slovenia) Zmago Sagadin	1
Krka	(Slovenia) Aleksander Sekulić	1
Maccabi Electra Tel Aviv	(Israel) David Blatt	2
Union Olimpija	(Slovenia) Sašo Filipovski	1
Partizan mt:s	(Serbia) Vlada Jovanović	2
Radnički	(Serbia) Miroslav Nikolić	3
Crvena zvezda BG DIVA	(Serbia) Svetislav Pešić	1
Zagreb CO	(Serbia) Vladimir Androić	1
Široki WWin	(Bosnia and Herzegovina) Ivan Velić	3

== Regular season ==
The regular season began on Saturday, 8 October 2011, and ended on Saturday, 14 April 2012.

=== Standings ===
Pos	Team	Pld	W	L	PF	PA	PD	Pts	Qualification or relegation
1	(Israel) Maccabi Electra Tel Aviv	26	24	2	2140	1741	+399	50	Qualified for the Final Four
2	(Croatia) Cedevita	26	19	7	2193	1927	+266	45	Qualified for the Final Four
3	(Serbia) Partizan mt:s	26	19	7	2035	1806	+229	45	Qualified for the Final Four
4	(Montenegro) Budućnost VOLI	26	18	8	1884	1761	+123	44	Qualified for the Final Four
5	(Bosnia and Herzegovina) Široki WWin	26	15	11	1960	1881	+79	41	
6	(Slovenia) Union Olimpija	26	14	12	1941	1984	−43	40	
7	(Croatia) Cibona	26	13	13	2099	2068	+31	39	
8	(Serbia) Radnički	26	12	14	2106	2124	−18	38	
9	(Croatia) Zagreb CO	26	12	14	2007	2118	−111	38	
10	(Serbia) Crvena zvezda DIVA	26	11	15	2074	2091	−17	37	
11	(Slovenia) Krka	26	9	17	1893	1988	−95	35	
12	(Serbia) Hemofarm STADA	26	7	19	1868	2076	−208	33	
13	(Slovenia) Helios Domžale	26	7	19	1863	2134	−271	33	
14	(Slovenia) Zlatorog Laško	26	2	24	1688	2052	−364	28	Relegated

Source: Standings – Regular Season
Rules for classification: 1) Points; 2) Goal difference; 3) Number of goals scored;

=== Schedule and results ===
1. round
Olimpija – Laško	89–77
Cedevita – Budućnost	92–62
Crvena Zvezda – Hemofarm	104–89
Zagreb – Partizan	65–93
Helios – Široki	90–92
Radnički – Cibona	94–98
Krka – Maccabi	68–83

2. round
Laško – Maccabi	72–101
Cibona – Krka	82–72
Široki – Radnički	92–93
Partizan – Helios	86–59
Hemofarm – Zagreb	80–77
Budućnost – Crvena Zvezda	79–64
Olimpija – Cedevita	84–81

3. round
Cedevita – Laško	85–73
Crvena Zvezda – Olimpija	93–101
Zagreb – Budućnost	81–72
Hemofarm – Helios	83–70
Partizan – Radnički	77–70
Krka – Široki	71–73
Maccabi – Cibona	97–81

4. round
Laško – Cibona	76–84
Široki – Maccabi	60–84
Partizan – Krka	68–63
Hemofarm – Radnički	70–66
Budućnost – Helios	78–60
Olimpija – Zagreb	91–90
Crvena Zvezda – Cedevita	90–91

5. round
Crvena Zvezda – Laško	104–64
Cedevita – Zagreb	97–51
Helios – Olimpija	63–77
Radnički – Budućnost	62–74
Krka – Hemofarm	81–74
Maccabi – Partizan	78–67
Cibona – Široki	75–70

6. round
Laško – Široki	53–78
Partizan – Cibona	91–67
Hemofarm – Maccabi	59–85
Budućnost – Krka	84–80
Olimpija – Radnički	85–70
Helios – Cedevita	62–87
Zagreb – Crvena Zvezda	102–85

7. round
Laško – Zagreb	85–86
Helios – Crvena Zvezda	88–79
Radnički – Cedevita	80–83
Krka – Olimpija	78–80
Budućnost – Maccabi	69–81
Cibona – Hemofarm	90–86
Široki – Partizan	78–82

8. round
Laško – Partizan	72–62
Hemofarm – Široki	74–70
Budućnost – Cibona	85–69
Maccabi – Olimpija	67–66
Cedevita – Krka	89–67
Crvena Zvezda – Radnički	79–84
Zagreb – Helios	72–57

9. round
Helios – Laško	83–66
Radnički – Zagreb	85–83
Krka – Crvena Zvezda	75–73
Maccabi – Cedevita	96–89
Cibona – Olimpija	81–70
Široki – Budućnost	84–77
Partizan – Hemofarm	82–60

10. round
Laško – Hemofarm	76–68
Budućnost – Partizan	76–68
Olimpija – Široki	50–78
Cedevita – Cibona	95–69
Crvena Zvezda – Maccabi	76–83
Zagreb – Krka	85–80
Helios – Radnički	90–98

11. round
Radnički – Laško	88–71
Krka – Helios	84–64
Zagreb – Maccabi	81–74
Cibona – Crvena Zvezda	87–73
Cedevita – Široki	74–60
Partizan – Olimpija	96–69
Hemofarm – Budućnost	77–78

12. round
Budućnost – Laško	81–75
Olimpija – Hemofarm	80–75
Cedevita – Partizan	75–57
Crvena Zvezda – Široki	83–72
Zagreb – Cibona	82–77
Maccabi – Helios	94–56
Radnički – Krka	82–75

13. round
Krka – Laško	72–67
Radnički – Maccabi	70–91
Helios – Cibona	78–76
Široki – Zagreb	89–78
Partizan – Crvena Zvezda	85–67
Hemofarm – Cedevita	74–78
Budućnost – Olimpija	63–56

14. round
Laško – Olimpija	63–69
Budućnost – Cedevita	81–64
Hemofarm – Crvena Zvezda	73–81
Partizan – Zagreb	94–85
Široki – Helios	85–59
Cibona – Radnički	81–87
Maccabi – Krka	77–57

15. round
Maccabi – Laško	87–51
Krka – Cibona	77–86
Radnički – Široki	86–93
Helios – Partizan	64–72
Zagreb – Hemofarm	77–67
Crvena Zvezda – Budućnost	63–57
Cedevita – Olimpija	93–75

16. round
Laško – Cedevita	64–83
Olimpija – Crvena Zvezda	74–73
Budućnost – Zagreb	81–70
Helios – Hemofarm	89–86
Radnički – Partizan	92–80
Široki – Krka	81–60
Cibona – Maccabi	85–91

17. round
Cibona – Laško	80–44
Maccabi – Široki	84–69
Krka – Partizan	70–79
Radnički – Hemofarm	94–74
Helios – Budućnost	60–81
Zagreb – Olimpija	74–78
Cedevita – Crvena Zvezda	96–91

18. round
Laško – Crvena Zvezda	56–70
Zagreb – Cedevita	96–92
Olimpija – Helios	83–92
Budućnost – Radnički	93–86
Hemofarm – Krka	84–63
Partizan – Maccabi	78–84
Široki – Cibona	84–75

19. round
Široki – Laško	72–64
Cibona – Partizan	77–83
Maccabi – Hemofarm	85–64
Krka – Budućnost	62–69
Radnički – Olimpija	88–76
Cedevita – Helios	98–72
Crvena Zvezda – Zagreb	87–74

20. round
Zagreb – Laško	71–64
Crvena Zvezda – Helios	86–69
Cedevita – Radnički	86–68
Olimpija – Krka	79–81
Maccabi – Budućnost	0–20
Hemofarm – Cibona	55–98
Partizan – Široki	86–59

21. round
Partizan – Laško	90–50
Široki – Hemofarm	72–65
Cibona – Budućnost	80–74
Olimpija – Maccabi	63–83
Krka – Cedevita	63–74
Radnički – Crvena Zvezda	86–90
Helios – Zagreb	81–82

22. round
Laško – Helios	67–73
Zagreb – Radnički	76–81
Crvena Zvezda – Krka	82–78
Cedevita – Maccabi	77–83
Olimpija – Cibona	58–61
Budućnost – Široki	68–61
Hemofarm – Partizan	66–87

23. round
Hemofarm – Laško	58–54
Partizan – Budućnost	67–58
Široki – Olimpija	64–71
Cibona – Cedevita	102–106
Maccabi – Crvena Zvezda	101–66
Krka – Zagreb	84–65
Radnički – Helios	72–77

24. round
Laško – Radnički	65–79
Helios – Krka	82–92
Maccabi – Zagreb	88–68
Crvena Zvezda – Cibona	80–67
Široki – Cedevita	76–65
Olimpija – Partizan	70–57
Budućnost – Hemofarm	84–65

25. round
Laško – Budućnost	62–72
Hemofarm – Olimpija	78–75
Partizan – Cedevita	67–63
Široki – Crvena Zvezda	76–66
Cibona – Zagreb	84–88
Helios – Maccabi	53–71
Krka – Radnički	73–69

26. round
Laško – Krka	57–67
Maccabi – Radnički	92–76
Cibona – Helios	87–72
Zagreb – Široki	48–72
Crvena Zvezda – Partizan	69–84
Cedevita – Hemofarm	80-64
Olimpija – Budućnost	73-68

== Stats leaders ==
=== Points ===
Rank	Name	Team	Points	Games	PPG
1.	(United States) David Simon	(Serbia) Radnički	504	26	19.38
2.	(United States) Mike Scott	(Serbia) Radnički	386	22	17.55
3.	(Croatia) Krunoslav Simon	(Croatia) Zagreb	339	22	15.41
4.	(Croatia) Fran Pilepić	(Bosnia and Herzegovina) Široki	370	25	14.80
5.	(Slovenia) Klemen Prepelič	(Slovenia) Helios Domžale	370	26	14.23

=== Rebounds ===
Rank	Name	Team	Rebounds	Games	RPG
1.	(United States) Mike Scott	(Serbia) Radnički	145	22	6.59
2.	(United States) David Simon	(Serbia) Radnički	170	26	6.54
3.	(Slovenia) Smiljan Pavič	(Slovenia) Krka	148	23	6.43
4.	(Croatia) Drago Pašalić	(Slovenia) Helios Domžale	161	26	6.19
5.	(Slovenia) Alen Omić	(Slovenia) Zlatorog Laško	160	26	6.15

=== Assists ===
Rank	Name	Team	Assists	Games	APG
1.	(Australia) Steven Marković	(Serbia) Radnički	146	21	6.95
2.	(Croatia) Jakov Vladović	(Bosnia and Herzegovina) Široki	110	22	5.00
3.	(Slovenia) Daniel Vujasinović	(Slovenia) Zlatorog Laško	117	25	4.68
4.	(Greece) Theodoros Papaloukas	(Israel) Maccabi	97	24	4.04
5.	(Croatia) Krunoslav Simon	(Croatia) Zagreb	85	22	3.86

=== Blocks ===
Rank	Name	Team	Blocks	Games	BPG
1.	(United States) David Simon	(Serbia) Radnički	37	26	1.42
2.	(United States) Shawn James	(Israel) Maccabi	32	23	1.39
3.	(United States) Richard Hendrix	(Israel) Maccabi	25	25	1.0
4.	(Montenegro) Boris Savović	(Serbia) Hemofarm	16	16	1.0
5.	(Serbia) Mile Ilić	(Serbia) Crvena zvezda	21	18	0.86

=== Ranking MVP ===
Rank	Name	Team	Efficiency	Games	Average
1.	(United States) David Simon	(Serbia) Radnički	579	26	22.27
2.	(United States) Mike Scott	(Serbia) Radnički	439	22	19.95
3.	(Croatia) Krunoslav Simon	(Croatia) Zagreb	423	22	19.23
4.	(United States) Antwain Barbour	(Croatia) Cibona	366	24	15.25
5.	(Slovenia) Klemen Prepelič	(Slovenia) Helios Domžale	371	26	14.27

=== MVP Round by Round ===
Round	Player	Team	Efficiency
1	(United States) David Simon	(Serbia) Radnički	28
1	(Serbia) Miljan Pavković	(Serbia) Radnički	28
1	(United States) D. J. Gay	(Slovenia) Helios Domžale	28
2	(United States) David Simon (2)	(Serbia) Radnički	38
3	(Montenegro) Nikola Peković	(Serbia) Partizan	34
4	(Croatia) Damir Markota	(Slovenia) Union Olimpija	36
5	(Slovenia) Smiljan Pavič	(Slovenia) Krka	34
6	(Montenegro) Nikola Vučević	(Montenegro) Budućnost	31
7	(Serbia) Vladimir Panić	(Slovenia) Zlatorog Laško	43
8	(Montenegro) Nikola Vučević (2)	(Montenegro) Budućnost	44
9	(Israel) Guy Pnini	(Israel) Maccabi Tel Aviv	33
10	(Australia) Steven Marković	(Serbia) Radnički	39
11	(Croatia) Krunoslav Simon	(Croatia) Zagreb	35
12	(Serbia) Petar Popović	(Serbia) Crvena zvezda	38
13	(Croatia) Vedran Vukušić	(Croatia) Cedevita	30
14	(United States) Mike Scott	(Serbia) Radnički	40
15	(Serbia) Miroslav Raduljica	(Serbia) Partizan	47
16	(Slovenia) Klemen Prepelič	(Slovenia) Helios Domžale	40
17	(Serbia) Mladen Pantić	(Serbia) Hemofarm	28
17	(United States) Omar Thomas	(Serbia) Crvena zvezda	28
18	(Croatia) Drago Pašalić	(Slovenia) Helios Domžale	31
19	(Croatia) Mario Kasun	(Croatia) Zagreb	35
20	(Croatia) Mario Kasun (2)	(Croatia) Zagreb	34
21	(Serbia) Čedomir Vitkovac	(Montenegro) Budućnost	34
22	(Croatia) Mario Kasun (3)	(Croatia) Zagreb	29
23	(United States) David Simon (3)	(Serbia) Radnički	40
24	(Slovenia) Klemen Prepelič (2)	(Slovenia) Helios Domžale	35
25	(Slovenia) Zoran Dragić	(Slovenia) Krka	29
26	(Serbia) Milan Mačvan	(Serbia) Partizan	34
SF	(United States) Keith Langford	(Israel) Maccabi Tel Aviv	22
F	(United States) Keith Langford (2)	(Israel) Maccabi Tel Aviv	30

Source: NLB League

== Final four ==
Matches in, Yad Eliyahu Arena, Tel Aviv, Israel

Semifinals; April 28
1	(Israel) Maccabi Electra Tel Aviv	82
4	(Montenegro) Budućnost VOLI	60
2	(Croatia) Cedevita	68
3	(Serbia) Partizan mt:s	56

Final; April 30
1	(Israel) Maccabi Electra Tel Aviv	87
2	(Croatia) Cedevita	77

=== Semifinals ===
April 28
20:15

Report

Maccabi Electra Tel Aviv (Israel)	82–60	(Montenegro) Budućnost VOLI
Scoring by quarter: 17-12, 25-8, 22-8, 18-22
Pts: Eliyahu 18; Rebs: Eliyahu 9 Asts: 5 players 3		Pts: Dubljević 17; Rebs: Vitkovac 6 Asts: 5 players 2

Yad Eliyahu Arena, Tel Aviv
Attendance: 10,500
Referees: Ilija Belošević (SRB), Dubravko Muhvić (CRO), Srđan Dožai (CRO)

April 28
17:45

Report

Cedevita (Croatia)	68–56	(Serbia) Partizan mt:s
Scoring by quarter: 14-15, 20-17, 17-14, 17-10
Pts: Owens 18; Rebs: 3 players 5 Asts: Warren 3		Pts: Raduljica 15; Rebs: Raduljica 7 Asts: 3 players 2

Yad Eliyahu Arena, Tel Aviv
Attendance: 2,000
Referees: Sašo Pukl (SLO), Matej Boltauzer (SLO), Zdravko Rutešić (MNE)

=== Final ===
April 30
20:15

Report

Maccabi Electra Tel Aviv (Israel)	87–77	(Croatia) Cedevita
Scoring by quarter: 27-11, 12-12, 25-24, 23-30
Pts: Langford 21; Rebs: Hendrix 7 Asts: Ohayon 7		Pts: Warren 24; Rebs: Bilan 9 Asts: Draper 6

Yad Eliyahu Arena, Tel Aviv
Attendance: 10,728
Referees: Ilija Belošević (SRB), Milivoje Jovčić (SRB), Milija Vojinović (SRB)

2011–12 ABA NLB League Champions
(Israel)
Maccabi Electra Tel Aviv
1st title
