= Uroš Nikolić =

Uroš Nikolić may refer to:

- Uroš Nikolić (footballer) (born 1993), Serbian football midfielder
- Uroš Nikolić (basketball) (born 1987), Serbian basketball player
- Uroš Nikolić (swimmer) (born 1996), Serbian swimmer
- Uros Nikolic (judoka), represented Australia at the 2022 Commonwealth Games
