= Šutalo =

Šutalo is a Croatian surname. Notable people with the surname include:

- Boško Šutalo (born 2000), Croatian footballer
- Ivana Šutalo (born 1994), Croatian judoka
- Josip Šutalo (born 2000), Croatian footballer
- Marko Šutalo (born 1983), Serbia-born Bosnian basketball player
