= Vladimir Lučić =

Serbian basketball player

Vladimir Lučić Владимир Лучић
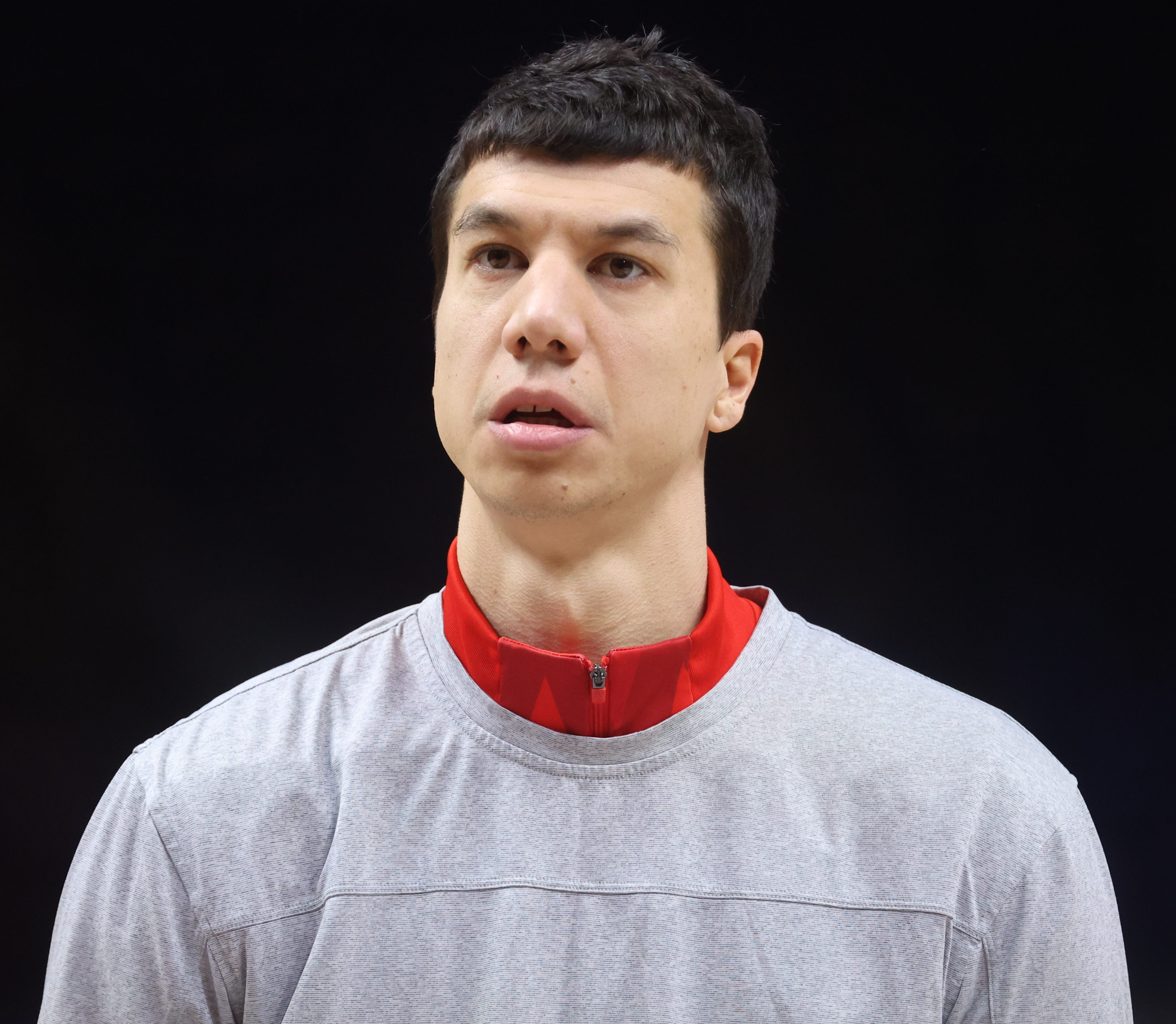
- Lučić with Bayern Munich in 2025

No. 11 – Bayern Munich
- Position: Small forward / power forward
- League: BBL; EuroLeague

Personal information
- Born: 17 June 1989 (age 37) Belgrade, SR Serbia, SFR Yugoslavia
- Listed height: 2.01 m (6 ft 7 in)
- Listed weight: 96 kg (212 lb)

Career information
- NBA draft: 2011: undrafted
- Playing career: 2006–present

Career history
- 2006–2008: Superfund
- 2008–2013: Partizan
- 2013–2016: Valencia
- 2016–present: Bayern Munich

Career highlights
- All-EuroLeague First Team (2021); All-EuroLeague Second Team (2022); EuroCup champion (2014); 4× Bundesliga champion (2018, 2019, 2024, 2025); All-Bundesliga Second Team (2019); 4× German Cup winner (2018, 2021, 2023, 2024); German Cup Final Four MVP (2021); 4× ABA League champion (2009–2011, 2013); 5× Serbian League champion (2009–2013); 4× Serbian Cup winner (2009–2012)
Medals
Men's basketball
Representing Serbia
EuroBasket
Silver medal – second place	2017 Finland–Israel–Romania–Turkey
Universiade
Gold medal – first place	2011 Shenzhen	Team

Vladimir Lučić (Serbian: Владимир Лучић, born 17 June 1989) is a Serbian professional basketball player and the team captain for Bayern Munich of the German Basketball Bundesliga (BBL) and the EuroLeague. He also represents the Serbian national basketball team. Standing at 2.01 m (6 ft 7 in), he primarily plays at the small forward position, but he can also play at the power forward position.

== Professional career ==
=== Superfund ===
Lučić started playing basketball at senior level with the Serbian team Superfund in 2006, where he stayed until 2008.

=== Partizan ===
After two years at Superfund, Lučić was signed by Partizan before the start of the 2008–09 season. In his initial two years at Partizan, Lučić played very little under head coach Duško Vujošević. In 2010–11, under new head coach Vlada Jovanović, Lučić received more playing time, alternating between small forward and power forward throughout the season. He improved his statistics, nearly doubling them in the Euroleague, averaging 5.8 points and 2.4 rebounds. Before the start of 2012–13 season, he became the next team captain, shortly after longtime captain Petar Božić left the team over the summer. He led his team over 2012–13 Euroleague season with 13.7 points and 4.8 rebounds over 10 games, but eventually Partizan didn't proceed to the next round of the competition. With Partizan, he won five consecutive Serbian League championships, four straight ABA Leagues and Serbian Cups.

=== Valencia ===
On 24 June 2013, Lučić signed a two-year contract with an option for a third year with Spanish club Valencia Basket. In his first season abroad, he had trouble with his back and left foot all over the season. He eventually had a foot surgery in January which sidelined him off the court until March. In his first EuroCup season, he averaged just 3.8 points and 2.3 rebounds over 8 games. Valencia eventually won the Eurocup, beating UNICS Kazan in the final.

On 17 June 2015, Valencia Basket extended the contract with him for one more season.

=== Bayern Munich ===
On 26 July 2016, Lučić signed a two-year contract with German club Bayern Munich. On 9 June 2017, Lučić signed a two-year contract extension with Bayern. He extended his contract until 2025 on 8 February 2022.

== Serbian national team ==
Lučić won a gold medal with the Serbian university team at the 2011 Summer Universiade in Shenzhen. He made his debut with the senior Serbian national basketball team in the FIBA EuroBasket 2013 qualification. However, in a first game (against Iceland) he got injured and latter missed the rest of the qualification.

Lučić also represented Serbia at the EuroBasket 2017 where they won the silver medal, after losing in the final game to Slovenia. Over 9 tournament games, he averaged 8.9 points, 5.6 rebounds and 1.1 assists per game.

At the 2019 FIBA Basketball World Cup, the national team of Serbia was dubbed as favorite to win the trophy, but was eventually upset in the quarterfinals by Argentina. With wins over the United States and Czech Republic, it finished in fifth place. Lučić averaged 7.1 points and 3 rebounds over 8 games.

== Personal life ==
His older brother Uroš Lučić is former a professional basketball player.

== Career statistics ==
Legend
GP	Games played	GS	Games started	MPG	Minutes per game
FG%	Field-goal percentage	3P%	3-point field-goal percentage	FT%	Free-throw percentage
RPG	Rebounds per game	APG	Assists per game	SPG	Steals per game
BPG	Blocks per game	PPG	Points per game	PIR	Performance index rating
**Bold**	Career high

=== EuroLeague ===
Year	Team	GP	GS	MPG	FG%	3P%	FT%	RPG	APG	SPG	BPG	PPG	PIR
2009–10	Partizan	1	0	1.3	.000	.000	.000	.0	.0	.0	.0	.0	-1.0
2010–11	Partizan	15	0	10.6	.522	.333	.667	1.9	.6	.2	.3	2.4	3.5
2011–12	Partizan	10	9	21.7	.365	.269	.867	2.4	1.0	.1	.1	5.8	3.0
2012–13	Partizan	10	9	**33.2**	.412	.323	.796	**4.8**	.8	**1.6**	.2	**13.7**	14.9
2014–15	Valencia	8	6	25.7	.476	.421	.762	3.3	.9	.9	**.4**	8.0	8.8
2018–19	Bayern Munich	29	29	26.2	.523	.351	.826	3.8	1.2	1.1	.2	10.0	12.1
2019–20	Bayern Munich	26	25	27.8	**.547**	.426	.847	3.8	1.5	1.0	.2	11.3	14.5
2020–21	Bayern Munich	31	31	31.0	.504	.441	.864	**4.8**	1.4	1.1	.1	13.6	**17.8**
2021–22	Bayern Munich	**32**	**32**	30.1	.427	.333	.881	4.2	1.5	.7	.2	12.1	14.2
2022–23	Bayern Munich	17	14	24.4	.429	.429	**.951**	2.6	.8	.8	.1	8.8	8.6
2023–24	Bayern Munich	20	13	25.2	.495	**.460**	.925	2.8	**1.8**	.5	.3	7.6	10.3
Career		199	168	26.3	.478	.388	.857	3.6	1.2	.8	.2	10.0	12.0

=== EuroCup ===
Year	Team	GP	GS	MPG	FG%	3P%	FT%	RPG	APG	SPG	BPG	PPG	PIR
2013–14	Valencia	8	0	18.3	.324	.143	**1.000**	2.3	.8	.5	**.1**	3.8	2.5
2014–15	Valencia	8	0	21.5	.432	**.438**	.833	3.8	**1.1**	.8	**.1**	8.8	11.1
2015–16	Valencia	15	9	16.0	.474	.429	.880	2.7	.7	.4	**.1**	5.7	6.6
2016–17	Bayern Munich	**17**	**17**	21.6	.448	.341	.857	2.8	.8	.4	**.1**	8.5	7.9
2017–18	Bayern Munich	8	3	**24.8**	**.569**	.375	.920	**4.0**	**1.1**	**.9**	—	**12.3**	**15.5**
Career		56	29	20.1	.460	.353	.875	3.0	.9	.5	.1	7.6	8.3

=== Domestic leagues ===
Year	Team	League	GP	MPG	FG%	3P%	FT%	RPG	APG	SPG	BPG	PPG
2008–09	(Serbia) Partizan	ABA	6	2.7	.333	.000	—	.8	—	.2	—	0.7
2009–10	(Serbia) Partizan	KLS	2	12.5	.444	.200	—	1.5	1.0	.5	—	4.5
2009–10	(Serbia) Partizan	ABA	8	3.5	.250	.000	.750	.5	—	.1	—	0.9
2010–11	(Serbia) Partizan	KLS	14	17.7	.586	.444	.882	3.2	1.7	1.1	—	7.5
2010–11	(Serbia) Partizan	ABA	26	14.8	.523	.313	.600	2.4	.6	.3	.2	4.7
2011–12	(Serbia) Partizan	KLS	19	21.9	.512	.319	.816	4.6	1.2	.8	.4	10.9
2011–12	(Serbia) Partizan	ABA	27	25.1	.471	.339	.805	3.6	1.5	1.3	.1	10.0
2012–13	(Serbia) Partizan	KLS	17	22.3	.504	.370	.848	2.9	1.3	1.0	—	11.8
2012–13	(Serbia) Partizan	ABA	25	26.7	.445	.370	.770	3.9	1.0	1.2	.1	12.0
2013–14	(Spain) Valencia	ACB	23	19.5	.454	.333	.825	3.6	.9	.5	.0	7.0
2014–15	(Spain) Valencia	ACB	38	22.7	.523	.317	.795	3.3	1.0	.8	.3	8.3
2015–16	(Spain) Valencia	ACB	34	14.0	.457	.271	.780	2.0	.6	.4	.1	4.8
2016–17	(Germany) Bayern Munich	BBL	40	21.8	.561	.397	.791	3.6	1.6	.6	.2	9.6
2017–18	(Germany) Bayern Munich	BBL	26	20.9	.625	.491	.938	3.4	1.0	.8	.1	10.3
2018–19	(Germany) Bayern Munich	BBL	39	23.3	.584	.477	.875	4.0	1.5	1.0	.1	10.8
2019–20	(Germany) Bayern Munich	BBL	23	23.4	.472	.353	.875	3.8	1.5	.6	.2	10.3
2020–21	(Germany) Bayern Munich	BBL	24	27.8	.467	.369	.946	4.0	1.4	1.0	.2	12.4
2021–22	(Germany) Bayern Munich	BBL	32	23.1	.457	.327	.844	3.8	1.9	.6	.2	9.1
2022–23	(Germany) Bayern Munich	BBL	10	21.7	.556	.280	.741	3.0	1.9	.8	.2	8.7
2023–24	(Germany) Bayern Munich	BBL	34	23.2	.466	.423	.870	3.9	2.1	.6	.1	8.0

Sporting positions
Preceded by Petar Božić	Partizan captain 2012–2013	Succeeded by Dragan Milosavljević
