= Miroslav Raduljica =

Serbian basketball player (born 1988)

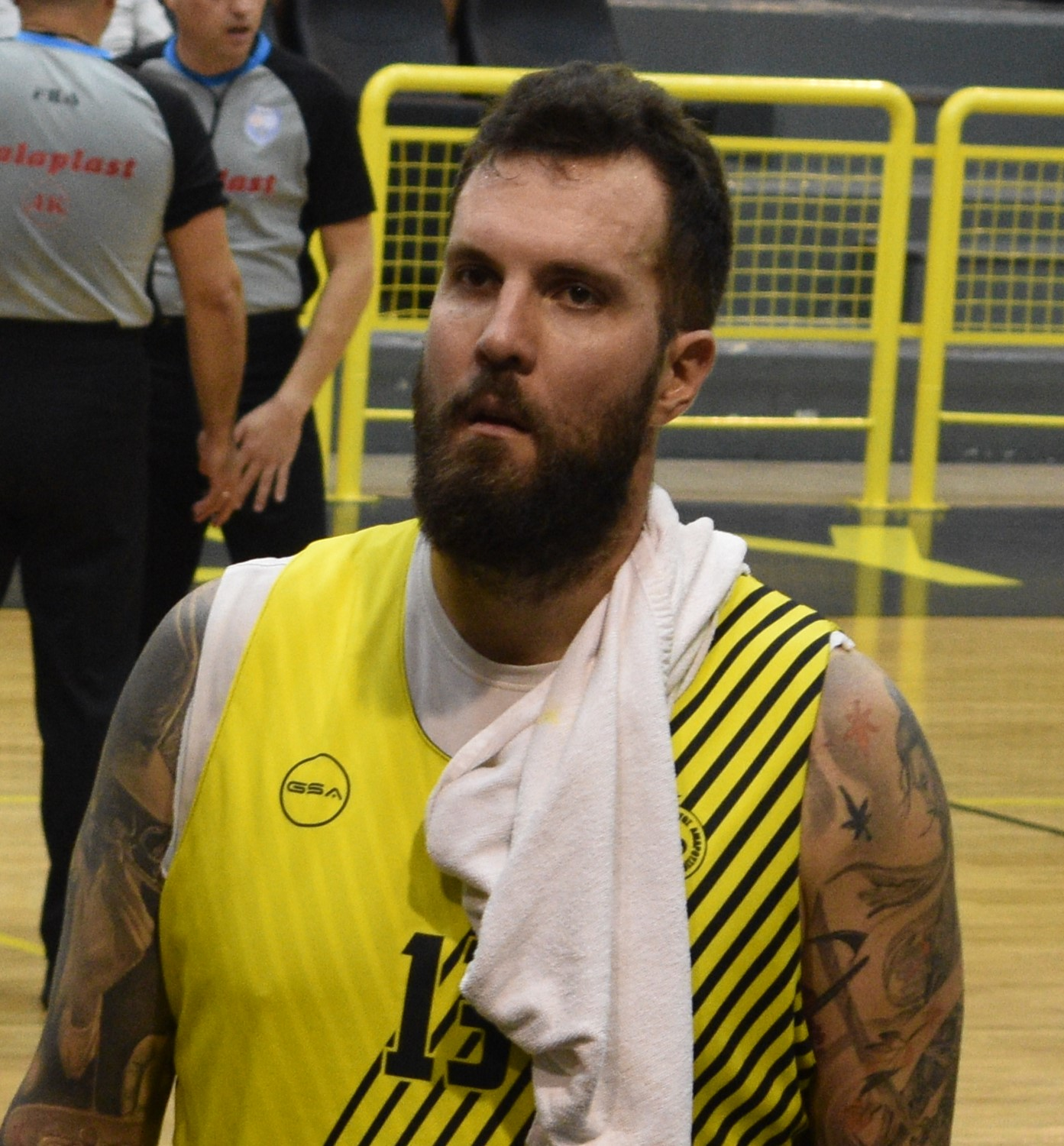
- Raduljica in 2023

Personal information
- Born: 5 January 1988 (age 38) Inđija, SR Serbia, SFR Yugoslavia
- Listed height: 2.13 m (7 ft 0 in)
- Listed weight: 113 kg (249 lb)

Career information
- NBA draft: 2010: undrafted
- Playing career: 2005–2025
- Position: Center
- Number: 9, 13, 11, 15

Career history
- 2005–2010: FMP
- 2006–2007: → Borac Čačak
- 2010–2013: Anadolu Efes
- 2011: → Alba Berlin
- 2011–2012: → Partizan
- 2012–2013: → Azovmash
- 2013–2014: Milwaukee Bucks
- 2014: Shandong Lions
- 2015: Minnesota Timberwolves
- 2015–2016: Panathinaikos
- 2016–2017: Olimpia Milano
- 2017–2020: Jiangsu Dragons
- 2020–2021: Zhejiang Lions
- 2021: Goyang Orions
- 2022–2023: Crvena zvezda
- 2023–2025: Maroussi

Career highlights
- Serbian League champion (2012); Serbian Cup winner (2012); Serbian League MVP (2010); Serbian League Top Scorer (2010); Serbian League rebounding leader (2010); Greek Cup winner (2016); Italian Cup winner (2017); FIBA Europe Under-20 Championship MVP (2008)
- Stats at NBA.com
- Stats at Basketball Reference

Other information
Association football career
- Position: Forward
Team information
- Current team: Železničar Inđija
- Number: 21
Senior career*
Years	Team	Apps	(Gls)
2025–	Železničar Inđija	0	(0)
- * Club domestic league appearances and goals as of 19 September 2025
Medals
Men's basketball
Representing Serbia
Summer Olympics
Silver medal – second place	2016 Rio de Janeiro	Team
World Cup
Silver medal – second place	2014 Spain	Team
EuroBasket
Silver medal – second place	2009 Poland	Team
Universiade
Gold medal – first place	2009 Belgrade	Team
FIBA Europe Under-20 Championship
Gold medal – first place	2008 Latvia	Team
FIBA Under-19 World Championship
Gold medal – first place	2007 Serbia	Team
Representing Serbia and Montenegro
FIBA Europe Under-18 Championship
Gold medal – first place	2005 Serbia and Montenegro	Team

Miroslav Raduljica (Serbian: Мирослав Радуљица; born 5 January 1988) is a Serbian former professional basketball player. He currently plays as a forward for FK Železničar Inđija of the Serbian SuperLiga. Raduljica has also represented the Serbian national team in international competitions. Standing at 2.13 m (7 ft 0 in), Raduljica plays at the center position.

== Professional career ==
=== Early careers in Serbia and Turkey ===
Raduljica began his career playing with the KK FMP junior teams in Serbia. He made his professional debut with FMP during the 2005–06 season. Raduljica spent the 2006–07 season on loan at KK Borac Čačak and then moved back to FMP. On 8 July 2010, Raduljica signed a five-year contract with Turkish club Efes Pilsen, but moved to Alba Berlin on loan during the season, with which he reached the finals of the German Bundesliga. On 25 August 2011, Raduljica moved to Partizan on loan for one season. On 22 September 2012, Raduljica moved to Ukrainian club Azovmash on a one-season loan.

=== NBA and China ===
On 26 July 2013, Raduljica signed with the Milwaukee Bucks of the National Basketball Association. In his debut season, he played sparingly for the 15-67 Bucks, earning just 9.7 minutes per match on average. In 48 matches, Raduljica earned 3.8 points and 2.3 rebounds on average per match. On 26 August 2014, along with Carlos Delfino and a 2015 second round draft pick, Raduljica was traded to the Los Angeles Clippers in exchange for Jared Dudley and a 2017 conditional first round draft pick. On 29 August 2014, he was waived by the Clippers.

On 19 September 2014, Raduljica signed a one-year contract with the Shandong Lions of the Chinese Basketball Association, with a guaranteed price of $1.5 million. On 23 December 2014, his contract was bought out by Shandong for $1.2 million. In 14 matches, he earned 18 points and 9 rebounds on average per match.

=== Return to NBA ===
On 8 January 2015, Raduljica signed a ten-day contract with the Minnesota Timberwolves. On 19 January 2015, he signed another ten-day contract with the club. On 28 January, he was waived by the Timberwolves after appearing in five matches.

=== Mediterranean career and China return ===
On 18 July 2015, Raduljica signed a two-year contract with Greek club Panathinaikos. On 4 December 2015, he had a personal career single match scoring high in the EuroLeague, with 25 points against Barcelona in a 93–86 home victory. After one season, he parted ways with the team.

On 15 July 2016, Raduljica signed another two-year contract, this time with Italian club EA7 Emporio Armani Milano. After one season, he left Milano. On 9 June 2017, he signed with the Jiangsu Dragons of the Chinese Basketball Association. Raduljica earned 25.4 points and 9.8 rebounds per game in the 2019–20 season on average. On 3 September 2020, he signed with Zhejiang Lions.

=== Later career ===
In July 2021, Raduljica signed for the Goyang Orions of the Korean Basketball League. On 11 December, he was waived after earning 8.6 points and 5.3 rebounds per match on average.

In September 2022, Raduljica signed for the 2022–23 campaign back home with KK Crvena zvezda. He left the club on 4 September 2023. Three days later, on 7 September, Raduljica re-signed for Maroussi of the Greek Basketball League. On 27 February 2025, he and Maroussi mutually agreed to part ways.

== Serbian national team ==
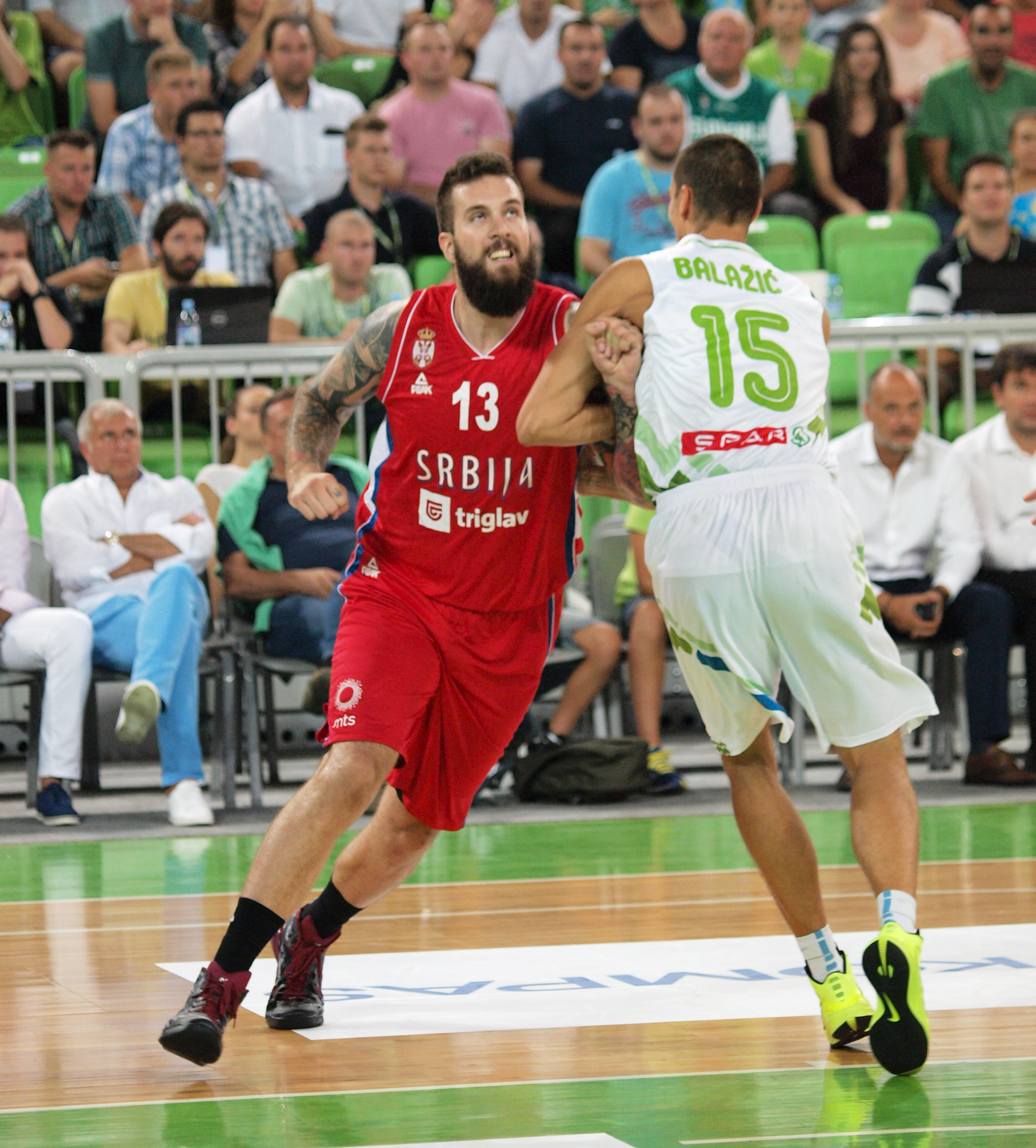
Miroslav Raduljica (left) vs Jure Balažič

Raduljica played with the Serbian junior national teams, having won gold medals at the 2005 FIBA Europe Under-18 Championship, the 2007 FIBA Under-19 World Championship, and the 2008 FIBA Europe Under-20 Championship where he was named the MVP.

Raduljica also played with the senior team that won the silver medal at the EuroBasket 2009 and the 2014 FIBA Basketball World Cup, the latter under head coach Aleksandar Đorđević. Over nine tournament matches, he earned 13 points and 4.6 rebounds in 21 minutes per match on average.

He represented Serbia again at the EuroBasket 2015. In the first phase of the tournament, Serbia dominated in the tournament's toughest group, Group B, with a 5–0 record, then eliminated Finland and the Czech Republic in the round of 16 and quarterfinal matches, respectively. However, they were beaten 67–64 in the semifinal match by Lithuania, and eventually lost against the host team, France in the third place play-off by a score of 81–68. Being a starting center, and one of the team's along with Miloš Teodosić and Nemanja Bjelica, Raduljica averaged 13.5 points and 5.0 rebounds, on 61.7% shooting from the field, in 9 tournament games, playing 18 minutes on average.

Raduljica also represented Serbia at the 2016 Summer Olympics where they won the silver medal after losing to the United States in the final game with 96–66.

At the 2019 FIBA Basketball World Cup, the national team of Serbia was dubbed as the favorite team to win the trophy, but eventually lost the quarterfinals against Argentina. With victories against the United States and the Czech Republic, it finished in fifth place. Raduljica was named the team's captain due to the absence of Teodosić. In seven tournament matches, he earned 6.1 points, 2.1 rebounds, and 1.6 assists on average.

== Football career ==
On 19 September 2025, Raduljica announced that he signed for FK Železničar Inđija in the Serbian League Vojvodina, with all of his salary going to charity. On 2 November, he made his football debut in the 12th round of a league match against GFK Sloven Ruma.

== Personal life ==
In July 2022, Raduljica married his girlfriend, volleyball player Tamara Ignjić. They welcomed their child in June 2024

== Career statistics ==
Legend
GP	Games played	GS	Games started	MPG	Minutes per game
FG%	Field-goal percentage	3P%	3-point field-goal percentage	FT%	Free-throw percentage
RPG	Rebounds per game	APG	Assists per game	SPG	Steals per game
BPG	Blocks per game	PPG	Points per game	PIR	Performance index rating
**Bold**	Career high	*	Led the league

=== NBA ===
==== Regular season ====
Year	Team	GP	GS	MPG	FG%	3P%	FT%	RPG	APG	SPG	BPG	PPG
2013–14	Milwaukee	**48**	**2**	**9.7**	**.540**	.000	.818	**2.3**	**.5**	**.1**	**.3**	**3.8**
2014–15	Minnesota	5	0	4.6	.375	.000	**1.000**	1.0	.0	**.1**	.0	1.6
**Career**		53	2	9.2	.530	.000	.825	2.1	.4	.2	.2	3.6

=== EuroLeague ===
Year	Team	GP	GS	MPG	FG%	3P%	FT%	RPG	APG	SPG	BPG	PPG	PIR
2010–11	Anadolu Efes	4	0	3.8	**1.000**	—	**1.000**	—	.5	.3	—	1.3	0.8
2011–12	Partizan	10	3	13.0	.385	—	.794	3.3	.5	.1	**.4**	5.7	5.1
2015–16	Panathinaikos	27	9	**20.4**	.568	—	.821	**4.4**	**1.3**	**.7**	.1	**12.7**	**13.7**
2016–17	Milano	**29**	**23**	15.5	.517	.000	.806	3.2	.9	.6	.0	8.1	7.8
2022–23	Crvena zvezda	3	1	4.3	.000	—	.600	—	—	.3	—	1.0	-2.3
**Career**		73	36	15.9	.531	.000	.808	3.4	.9	.5	.1	8.8	8.8

=== CBA ===
Year	Team	GP	GS	MPG	FG%	3P%	FT%	RPG	APG	SPG	BPG	PPG
2014–15	Shandong	14	2	26.1	.538	.000	.795	9.1	1.7	1.3	.3	18.3
2017–18	Jiangsu	38*	12	30.9	.541	.217	**.835**	9.8	2.8	**1.4**	.4	21.8
2018–19	Jiangsu	**44**	23	30.2	**.579**	**.442**	.830	9.6	2.9	1.2	.8	22.9
2019–20	Jiangsu	30	16	31.5	.556	.377	.803	9.8	2.6	1.2	**.9**	**25.4**
2020–21	Zhejiang	35	**34**	**31.9**	.534	.283	.803	**10.5**	**4.5**	1.2	.5	23.6
**Career**		161	87	30.1	.550	.264	.813	9.8	2.9	1.3	.6	22.4

== See also ==
- List of European basketball players in the United States
- List of Serbian NBA players
- List of Olympic medalists in basketball

Sporting positions
Preceded by Milan Mačvan	Serbia captain 2019 – present	Succeeded by Incumbent
