= Boris Bakić =

Montenegrin basketball player (born 1986)

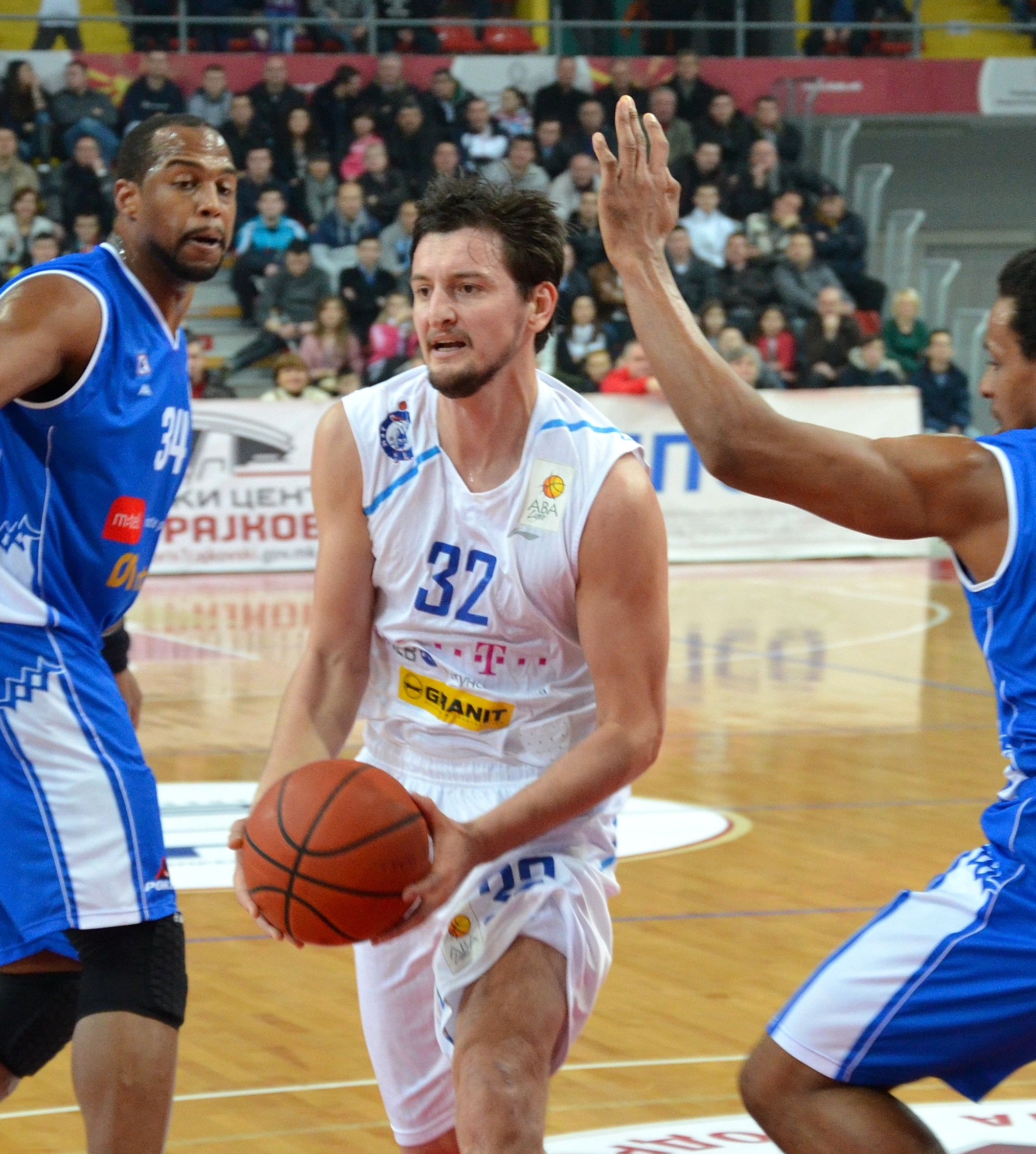
- Bakić with MZT in February 2013

Personal information
- Born: 23 May 1986 (age 40) Titograd, SR Montenegro, SFR Yugoslavia
- Listed height: 6 ft 4 1/4 in (1.94 m)
- Listed weight: 175 lb (79 kg)

Career information
- Playing career: 2003–2019
- Position: Shooting guard / point guard

Career history
- 2003–2004: Budućnost
- 2004–2007: Partizan
- 2007–2011: Crvena zvezda
- 2011–2012: Radnički Kragujevac
- 2012–2013: MZT Skopje
- 2013–2014: Igokea
- 2014–2016: Metalac Valjevo
- 2016: BCM U Piteşti
- 2016: Mladost Zemun
- 2016–2018: Mornar Bar
- 2018: Zrinjski Mostar
- 2019: Prievidza

Career highlights
- Adriatic League champion (2007); Yugoslavian League champion (2005, 2006); Serbian League champion (2007); Macedonian League champion (2013); Bosnian League champion (2014); Montenegrin League champion (2018); Macedonian Cup winner (2013); Crvena zvezda Club 100 (2020)
Medals
Men's basketball
Representing Serbia and Montenegro
U20 European Championship
Gold medal – first place	2006 Turkey	Team
Bronze medal – third place	2005 Russia	Team

Boris Bakić (Serbian Cyrillic: Борис Бакић; born 23 May 1986) is a Montenegrin retired professional basketball player.

== Professional career ==
Bakić grew up with KK Budućnost youth team.

While at KK Partizan, he won Adriatic League trophy (2007). During his stay in Partizan, he also won three national championship trophies (2005, 2006, 2007) and cup trophy (2007).

In the 2012–13 season he played for MZT Skopje and won the Macedonian championship and Macedonian Cup. In June 2013, he signed with Igokea. With Igokea Bakić won the Championship of Bosnia and Herzegovina in 2014.

In September 2014, he signed with Metalac Valjevo. In February 2016, he left Metalac and signed with Romanian club BCM U Piteşti for the rest of the 2015–16 Liga Națională season.

The 2016–17 season, Bakić started with the Serbian League club Mladost Zemun, but on 7 December 2016 he left Mladost and signed with Mornar Bar. He retired as a player with Prievidza in 2019.

== National team career ==
He was a member of Serbia & Montenegro U20 national team and played both at the 2005 and 2006 U20 European Championship (won one bronze and one gold medal).

Bakić represented the senior men's Montenegrin national team at the EuroBasket 2011 held in Lithuania. Over 5 tournament games, he averaged 1.2 points per game, as Montenegro finished the tournament after first phase.

== See also ==
- List of KK Crvena zvezda players with 100 games played
