= Bojan Radetić =

Serbian basketball player

Free agent
- Position: Power forward

Personal information
- Born: August 19, 1988 (age 38) Banja Luka, SFR Yugoslavia
- Listed height: 2.03 m (6 ft 8 in)
- Listed weight: 114 kg (251 lb)

Career information
- NBA draft: 2009: undrafted
- Playing career: 2007–present

Career history
- 2007–2009: Borac Čačak
- 2009–2010: FMP Železnik
- 2011–2012: Crvena zvezda
- 2012: Stockholm Eagles
- 2013: Igokea
- 2013–2014: OKK Beograd
- 2014: Gaz Metan Mediaş
- 2014–2015: OKK Beograd
- 2015–2016: Yambol
- 2016–2017: Pagrati
Medals
Men's basketball
Representing Serbia
U20 European Championship
Gold medal – first place	2008 Latvia	U20 Team

Bojan Radetić (Serbian: Бојан Радетић, born August 19, 1988) is a Serbian professional basketball player who last played for Pagrati of the Greek A2 Basket League. He is a 2.03 m (6 ft 8 in) tall power forward.

== Professional career ==
Senior career began in Borac Čačak where he played since 2007 to 2009 year. Then one season he plays in FMP Železnik. In 2011 he managed to impose Pešić and get into the first team of Crvena zvezda. In January 2013, he signed with Igokea. In July 2013, he signed with Śląsk Wrocław. He left them before the start of the season. In November 2013, he joined OKK Beograd. In February 2014, he signed with Gaz Metan Mediaş for the rest of the season. For the 2014–15 season he returned to OKK Beograd. In September 2015, he signed with Bulgarian club BC Yambol.

== Serbian national team ==
Radetić was member of the junior national teams of Serbia. He played at the 2008 FIBA Europe Under-20 Championship in Latvia, where he won the gold medal.
