= Andrej Džaković =

Serbian basketball player

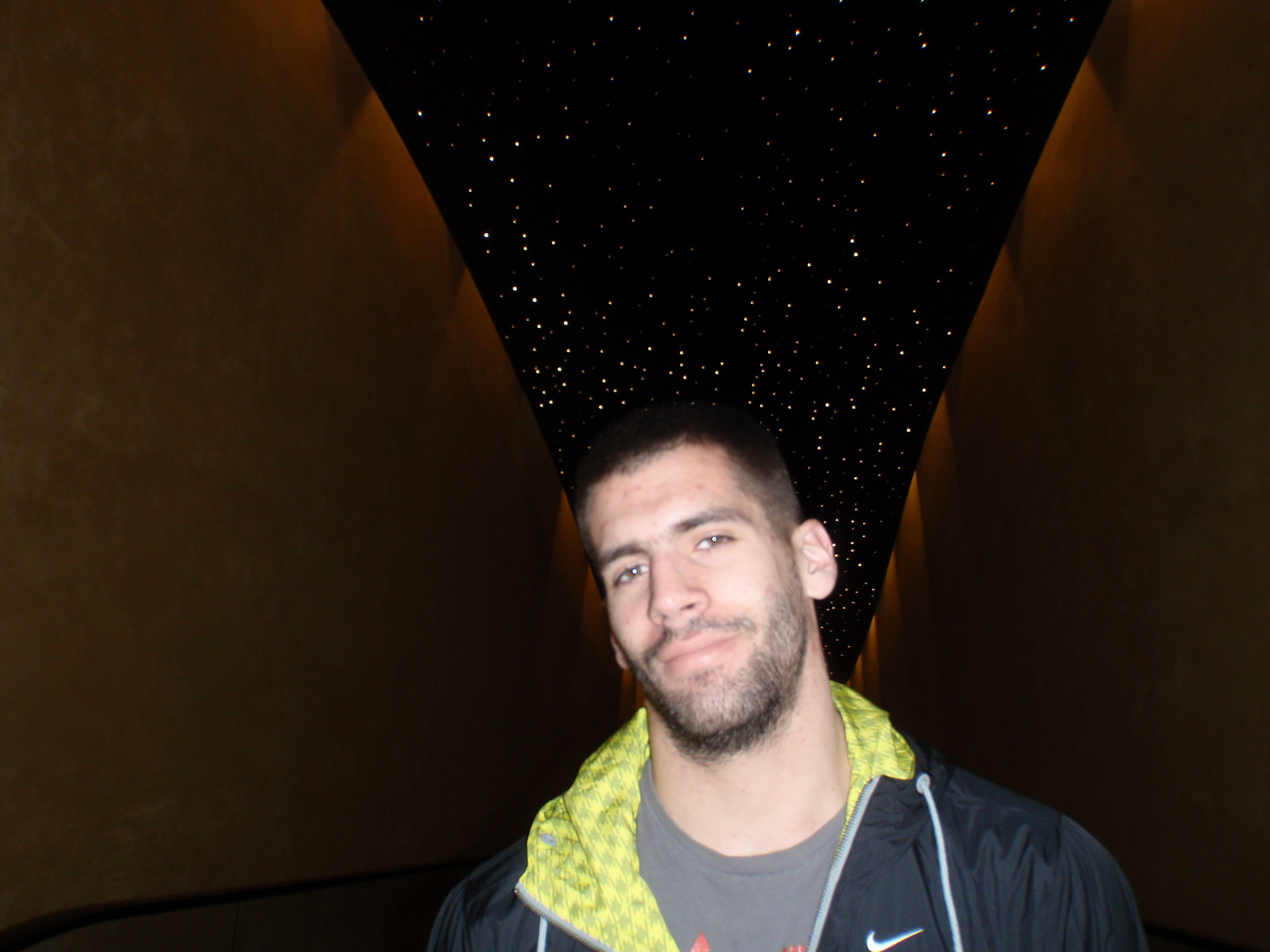

Personal information
- Born: January 30, 1988 (age 38) Pljevlja, SR Montenegro, SFR Yugoslavia
- Listed height: 1.94 m (6 ft 4 in)
- Listed weight: 90 kg (198 lb)

Career information
- NBA draft: 2010: undrafted
- Playing career: 2005–2014
- Position: Shooting guard

Career history
- 2005–2006: KK Cerak
- 2006–2009: Beovuk
- 2009–2010: Radnički KG 06
- 2010–2012: FMP
- 2012–2014: Radnički FMP

Andrej Džaković (Serbian Cyrillic: Андреј Џаковић; born January 30, 1988) is a Serbian former professional basketball player.
