= Nikola Vasić =

Serbian basketball player (born 1984)

Personal information
- Born: September 15, 1984 (age 42) Šabac, SR Serbia, SFR Yugoslavia
- Listed height: 6 ft 5 in (1.96 m)
- Listed weight: 187 lb (85 kg)

Career information
- NBA draft: 2006: undrafted
- Playing career: 2003–2016
- Position: Guard

Career history
- 2003–2006: FMP
- 2004–2005: → Borac Čačak
- 2006–2007: Lucentum Alicante
- 2007–2008: Triumph Lyubertsy
- 2008: Fuenlabrada
- 2009: Kyiv
- 2009: Polytekhnika-Halychyna
- 2011–2012: Crvena zvezda
- 2013–2014: Elektra Šoštanj
- 2015–2016: Zlatibor
Medals
Men's basketball
Representing Serbia and Montenegro
Universiade
Gold medal – first place	2003 Daegu	Team competition

Nikola Vasić (Serbian Cyrillic: Никола Васић, born September 15, 1984) is a Serbian retired professional basketball player.

== Career ==
Being a product of FMP's youth system, Nikola has passed through all of the club's ranks, as a top player. After playing in the youth and the second team, he was loaned to Borac Čačak, then an FMP's affiliate.

Following a season of playing at FMP as a starting shooting guard, Nikola moved to Spain, signing a four-year contract with an ACB League side Alicante. After only a year there, he moved to an ambitious Triumph Lyubertsy side, which he left after six months to play only 16 games during a season and a half at Spanish Fuenlabrada.

He spent the following season at then the Ukrainian EuroChallenge representative, Polytekhnika-Halychyna, but appeared in only six matches, due to chronic injury problems in his back. He missed most of the 2009-10 and the whole 2010-11 season recovering from an injury.

In August 2013, he signed with UBC Gussing Knights. He left them before the start of the season and then in November 2013, he signed with Elektra Šoštanj. He parted ways with Elektra in January 2014.
