= Chris Warren (basketball, born 1981) =

Panamanian-American basketball player

Personal information
- Born: January 19, 1981 (age 45) Garland, Texas, US
- Listed height: 6 ft 5 in (1.96 m)
- Listed weight: 195 lb (88 kg)

Career information
- High school: Lakeview Centennial (Garland, Texas)
- College: Collin CC (1999–2001); South Carolina (2001–2003)
- NBA draft: 2003: undrafted
- Playing career: 2003–2017
- Position: Shooting guard

Career history
- 2003: Panteras de Aguascalientes
- 2004: Deportivo Universidad Católica
- 2004: Panteras de Aguascalientes
- 2005: Oliveirense
- 2005: Reflex Železnik
- 2005: Mineros de Cananea
- 2006: Tiburones Mazatlán
- 2006–2008: Cibona
- 2008–2009: Scandone Avellino
- 2009–2011: Bilbao Basket
- 2011–2012: Cedevita
- 2012: Scandone Avellino
- 2013–2014: Bnei Herzliya
- 2015: Karpoš Sokoli
- 2015: Zabok
- 2015–2016: Panteras de Aguascalientes
- 2016: Obras Sanitarias
- 2017: Panteras de Aguascalientes

Career highlights
- Mexican LNBP champion (2003); 2× Croatian League champion (2006–2008); Croatian Supercup winner (2011); Croatian All-Star (2008); Adriatic League All-Star (2007)

Christopher Levour Warren (born January 19, 1981) is a Panamanian-American former professional basketball player. He is a 1.96 m (6 ft 5 in) tall shooting guard.

== College career ==
As a junior, Warren averaged 4.1 points per game off the bench for a University of South Carolina team that was the National Invitation Tournament runner up in the 2001–02 season. He increased his numbers the following year reaching 9.6 points per game. His game was not spectacular, but he earned the reputation of a solid defensive player who could also run the floor well and had a good first step. The latter offensive skill would prove to be more than accurate during his career in the Euroleague.

== Professional career ==
Not being drafted by any NBA team and being unknown in Europe, Warren signed for the 2003–04 season with the Mexican League club Panteras de Aguascalientes and won the Mexican championship. He started the following season with Chilean League club Deportivo Universidad Católica and then went back to Panteras de Aguascalientes. In January 2005 he played in Portugal four games for Oliveirense. In February 2005, he moved to Serbia and signed with Reflex Železnik for the rest of the season. After that, he went back again to Mexico where he played for Mineros de Cananea and Tiburones Mazatlán of the CIBACOPA.

Warren's big opportunity came in February 2006, when he moved to Croatia for traditional powerhouse KK Cibona and played there until the end of the 2007–08 championship. With Cibona he won back to back Croatian Championships and had two great EuroLeague seasons, averaging 13.7 and 15.6 points per game.

In July 2008, he signed with Scandone Avellino of Italy for the 2008–09 season. In June 2009, he signed with Bilbao Basket of Spain. He stayed with Bilbao till the summer of 2011, when he signed with Cedevita Zagreb of Croatia for the 2011–12 season.

In August 2012, he returned to his former team Scandone Avellino. In November 2011, Avellino waived him after he had some problems with injuries. In September 2013, he signed with Bnei Herzliya of Israel for the 2013–14 season.

In January 2015, Warren signed with Karpoš Sokoli of the Macedonian First League.

In October 2015, Warren returned to Croatia for the third time, signing with KK Zabok of the Croatian A-1 Liga. In December 2015, he left Zabok and signed with his former team Panteras de Aguascalientes of the Mexican LNBP. In March 2016, he moved to the Argentinian club Obras Sanitarias.

== National team career ==
Warren is a member of the Panama men's national basketball team and won the bronze medal at the 2003 Centrobasket. He also played at the 2005 FIBA Americas Championship, finishing fifth.

== Career statistics ==
Legend
| GP | Games played | GS | Games started | MPG | Minutes per game |
| FG% | Field-goal percentage | 3P% | 3-point field-goal percentage | FT% | Free-throw percentage |
| RPG | Rebounds per game | APG | Assists per game | SPG | Steals per game |
| BPG | Blocks per game | PPG | Points per game | PIR | Performance index rating |
| **Bold** | Career high |

=== College ===
| Year | Team | GP | GS | MPG | FG% | 3P% | FT% | RPG | APG | SPG | BPG | PPG |
|---|---|---|---|---|---|---|---|---|---|---|---|---|
| 2001–02 | South Carolina | **36** | 0 | 13.4 | .343 | .323 | .775 | 2.2 | 0.9 | 0.4 | 0.1 | 4.1 |
| 2002–03 | South Carolina | 22 | **12** | **24.3** | **.440** | **.406** | **.776** | **2.5** | **1.4** | **0.8** | **0.2** | **9.6** |
| Career | | 58 | 12 | 17.7 | .394 | .366 | .775 | 2.3 | 1.1 | 0.5 | 0.1 | 6.2 |

=== EuroLeague ===
| Year | Team | GP | GS | MPG | FG% | 3P% | FT% | RPG | APG | SPG | BPG | PPG | PIR |
|---|---|---|---|---|---|---|---|---|---|---|---|---|---|
| 2005–06 | Cibona Zagreb | 6 | 6 | 21.7 | **.543** | **.545** | .714 | 3.3 | 0.2 | 0.3 | **0.7** | 8.2 | 6.2 |
| 2006–07 | Cibona Zagreb | **14** | 12 | 31.0 | .444 | .414 | .755 | 4.9 | 1.3 | 1.2 | 0.1 | 13.7 | 12.4 |
| 2007–08 | Cibona Zagreb | **14** | **13** | 31.6 | .458 | .394 | **.804** | 4.6 | 1.8 | **1.5** | 0.1 | 15.6 | **16.3** |
| 2008–09 | Scandone Avellino | 10 | 10 | **34.2** | .408 | .360 | .683 | **5.0** | **2.7** | 1.1 | 0.3 | **16.2** | 13.8 |
| Career | | 44 | 41 | 30.6 | .445 | .400 | .750 | 4.6 | 1.6 | 1.2 | 0.3 | 14.1 | 13.1 |

=== EuroCup ===
| Year | Team | GP | GS | MPG | FG% | 3P% | FT% | RPG | APG | SPG | BPG | PPG | PIR |
|---|---|---|---|---|---|---|---|---|---|---|---|---|---|
| 2009–10 | Scandone Avellino | **14** | **12** | 25.8 | **.425** | **.296** | **.765** | 2.9 | 1.6 | **1.2** | 0.1 | 9.4 | **9.4** |
| 2011–12 | Cedevita Zagreb | 4 | 4 | **30.0** | .359 | .231 | .714 | **4.0** | **1.8** | 0.8 | **0.3** | **10.3** | 9.3 |
| Career | | 18 | 16 | 26.7 | .447 | .284 | .750 | 3.1 | 1.6 | 1.1 | 0.2 | 9.6 | 9.3 |
