= Marko Boltić =

Serbian basketball player

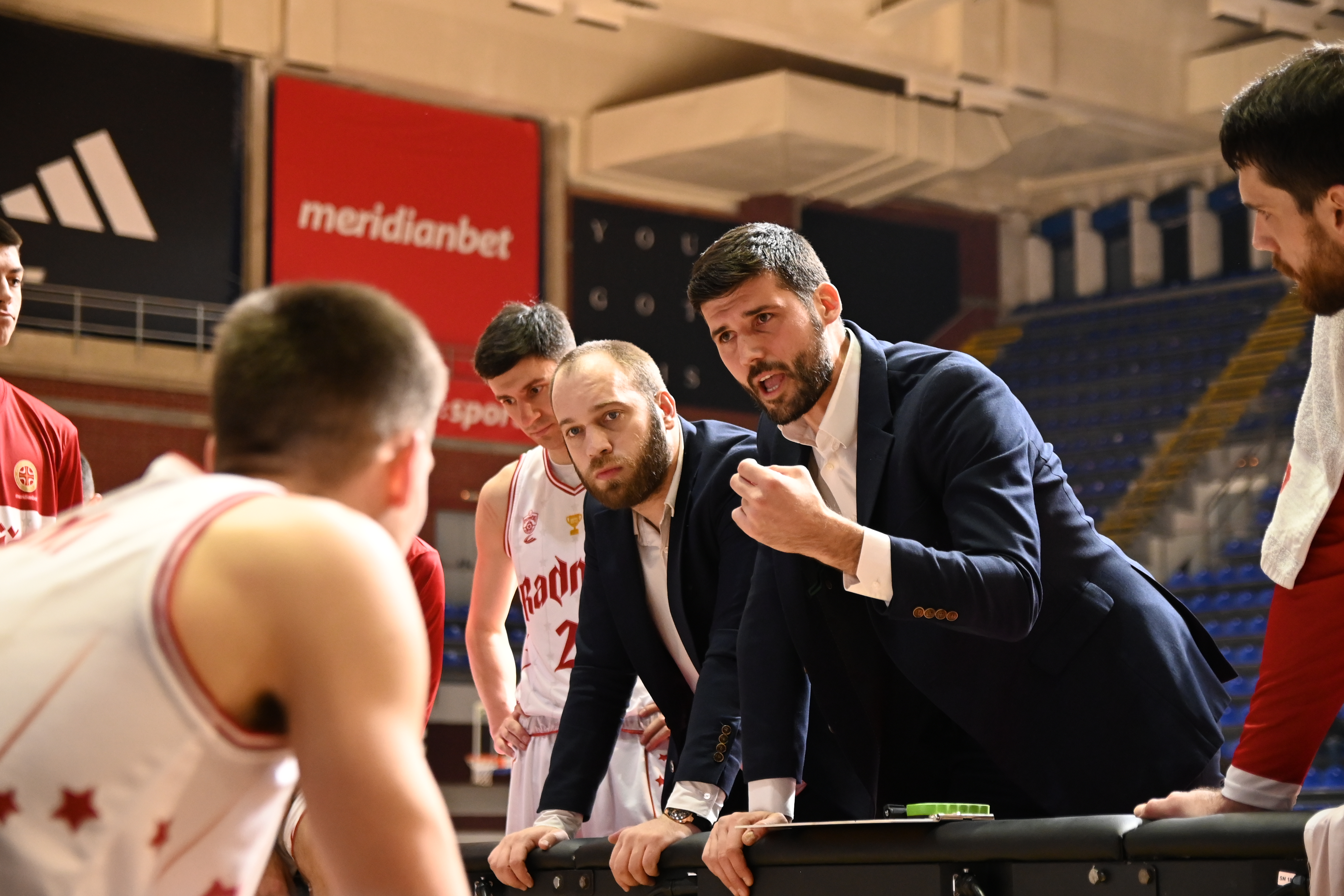

Crvena zvezda
- Title: Assistant coach
- League: KLS; ABA League; EuroLeague

Personal information
- Born: 30 October 1987 (age 39) Belgrade, SR Serbia, SFR Yugoslavia
- Listed height: 1.93 m (6 ft 4 in)

Career information
- NBA draft: 2009: undrafted
- Playing career: 2008–2021
- Position: Shooting guard
- Coaching career: 2021–present

Career history

Playing
- 2008–2009: Mladost Zemun
- 2010–2013: BKK Radnički
- 2013: Vojvodina Srbijagas
- 2013–2014: Domžale
- 2014–2015: SCM U Craiova
- 2015–2016: Karpoš Sokoli
- 2016–2019: Naturtex-SZTE-Szedeák
- 2019–2020: Vevey Riviera
- 2020–2021: OKK Beograd

Coaching
- 2021–2026: BKK Radnički
- 2026–present: Crvena zvezda (assistant)

Marko Boltić (Serbian Cyrillic: Марко Болтић; born 30 October 1987) is a Serbian professional basketball coach and former player who is an assistant coach for KK Crvena zvezda of the Basketball League of Serbia (KLS), the ABA League and the EuroLeague.
