= Jure Balažič =

Slovenian basketball player

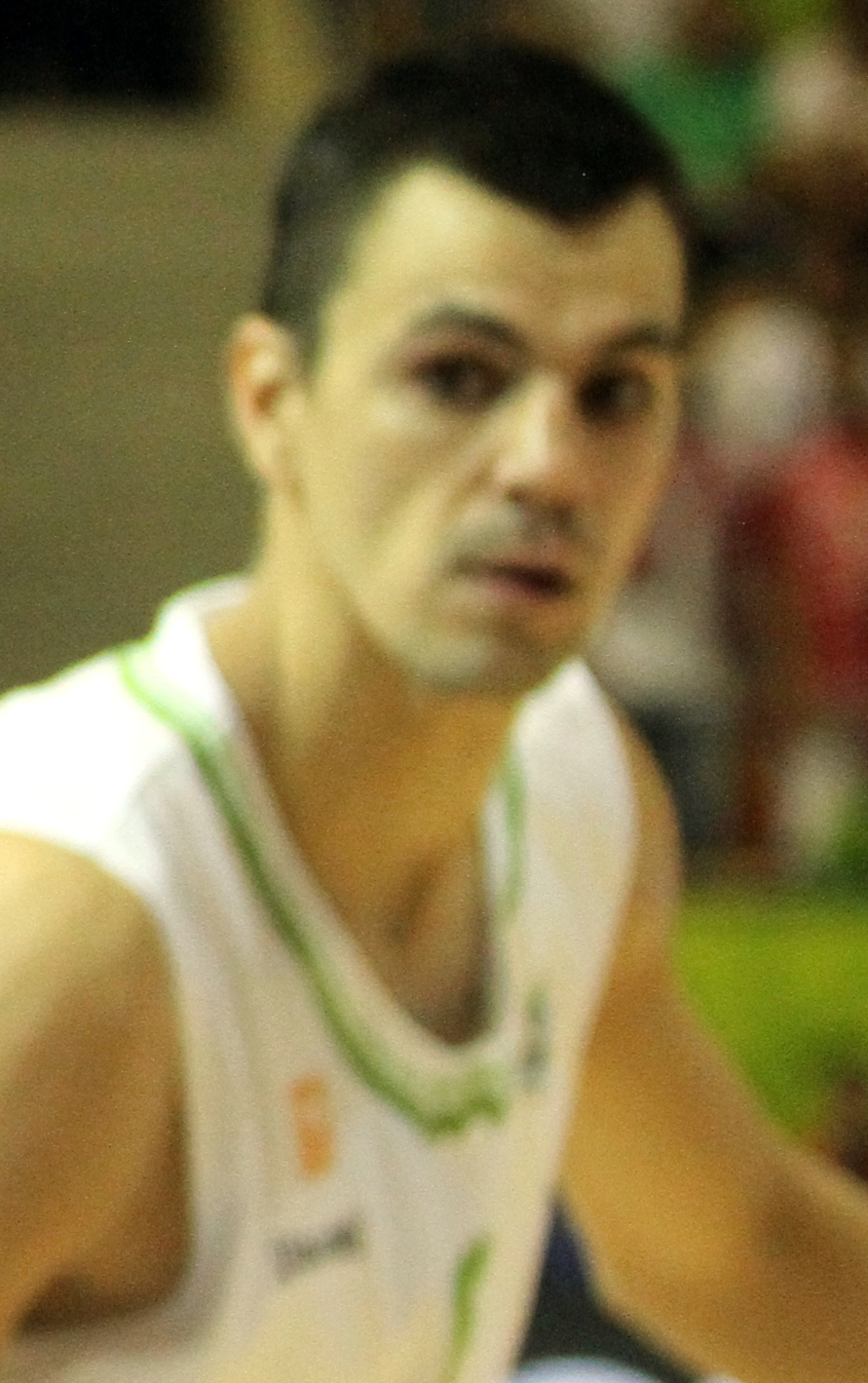
- Balažič at the EuroBasket 2013

Personal information
- Born: September 12, 1980 (age 46) Ljubljana, SR Slovenia, SFR Yugoslavia
- Listed height: 6 ft 8 1/4 in (2.04 m)
- Listed weight: 230 lb (104 kg)

Career information
- NBA draft: 2002: undrafted
- Playing career: 1999–2020
- Position: Power forward
- Number: 15

Career history
- 1999–2001: Krka Novo Mesto
- 2001–2002: Krško
- 2002–2005: Krka Novo Mesto
- 2005: KK Zagreb
- 2005–2006: APOEL Nicosia
- 2006–2007: Atomerőmű SE Paks
- 2007–2012: Krka
- 2012–2013: Erdemirspor
- 2013–2014: Tofaş
- 2014–2015: İstanbul BB
- 2015–2018: Gaziantep
- 2018–2020: Krka

Career highlights
- 5× Slovenian champion (2000, 2003, 2010, 2011, 2012); EuroChallenge champion (2011); Slovenian All-Star Game MVP (2008)

Jure Balažič (born September 12, 1980) is a Slovenian retired professional basketball player. He is a 204 cm tall power forward position.

== Slovenia national team ==
Balažić was first time called to Slovenia national basketball team in 2012 on prep camp. He made his official debut on Eurobasket 2013, making him the oldest debutant for Slovenia at 31 years, 11 months, and 23 days. He was also member of Slovenia at 2014 FIBA Basketball World Cup. He represented Slovenia at the 2015 EuroBasket where they were eliminated by Latvia in eighth finals.
