= Uroš Nikolić (basketball) =

Serbian basketball player (born 1987)

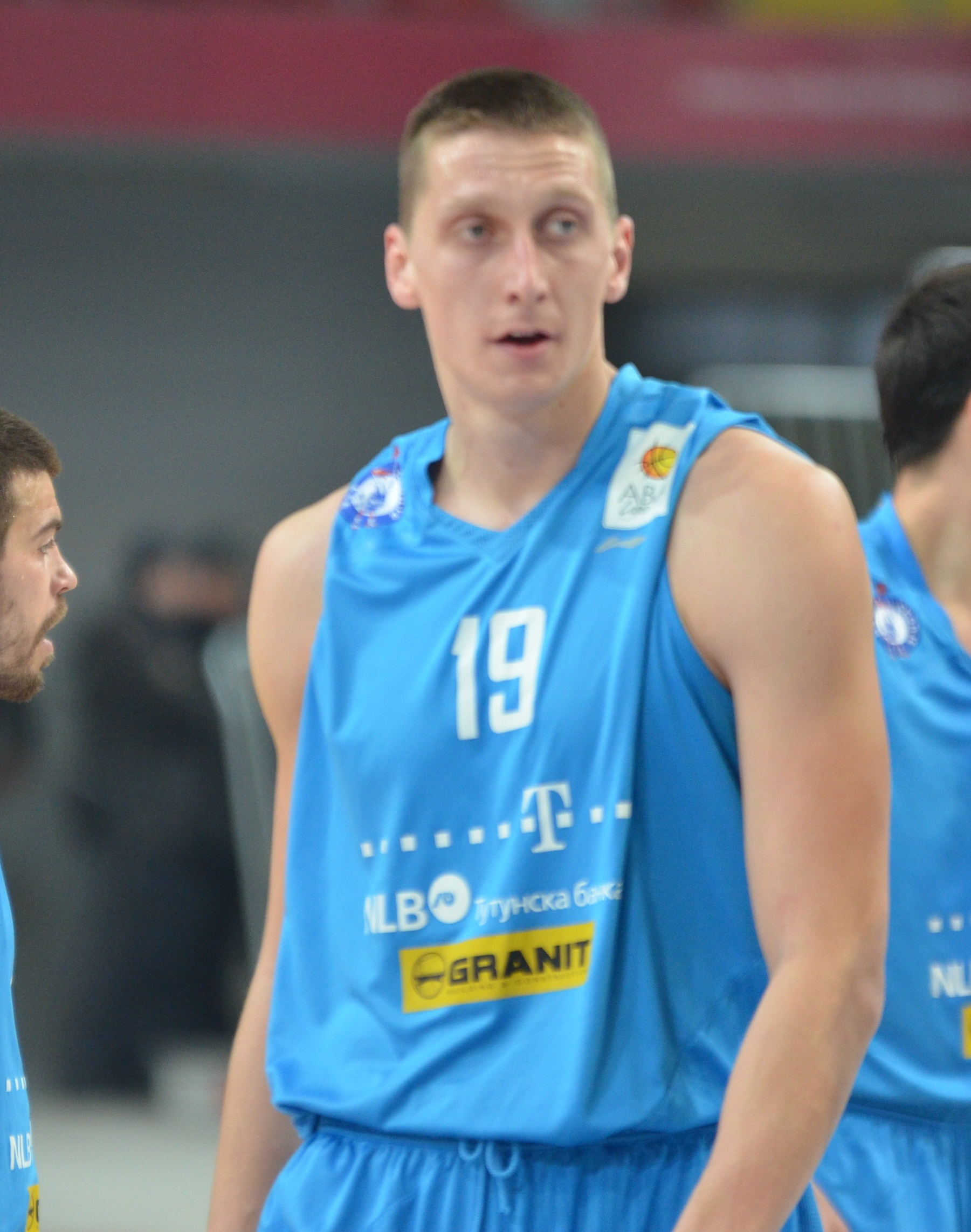
- Nikolić with MZT Skopje in 2012

SPD Radnički
- Position: Power forward / center
- League: Basketball League of Serbia

Personal information
- Born: 25 April 1987 (age 39) Kragujevac, SR Serbia, SFR Yugoslavia
- Listed height: 6 ft 10 in (2.08 m)
- Listed weight: 207 lb (94 kg)

Career information
- NBA draft: 2009: undrafted
- Playing career: 2005–present

Career history
- 2005–2006: Hemofarm
- 2006–2009: Mega Vizura
- 2009–2010: Krka
- 2010–2012: Crvena zvezda
- 2012–2013: MZT Skopje
- 2013: Radnički Kragujevac
- 2013–2014: Igokea
- 2014–2015: Turów Zgorzelec
- 2015–2016: Wilki Morskie Szczecin
- 2016–2017: Turów Zgorzelec
- 2017–2018: Monthey
- 2018–2019: Mons-Hainaut
- 2019–2020: Vevey Riviera Basket
- 2020–2022: Lugano Tigers
- 2022–2023: Fribourg Olympic
- 2023–present: SPD Radnički

Career highlights
- Polish League champion (2014); Polish Supercup winner (2014); Slovenian League champion (2010)
Medals
Men's basketball
Representing Serbia
U20 European Championship
Gold medal – first place	2007 Slovenia	U20 National Team

Uroš Nikolić (Serbian: Урош Николић; born 25 April 1987) is a Serbian professional basketball player for SPD Radnički of the Basketball League of Serbia.

== Professional career ==
Uroš had his first senior basketball experience with Hemofarm in 2005, after which he spent three years playing for a Belgrade-based club Mega Vizura. After a season with the Slovenian team Krka, he returned to Belgrade and signed a contract with Crvena zvezda in 2010.

In September 2012, he signed a contract with the Macedonian team MZT Skopje. In March 2013, he returned to Serbia and signed with Radnički Kragujevac for the rest of the 2012–13 season. In July 2013 he signed with Igokea. He left them in April 2014, and signed with Turów Zgorzelec of the Polish Basketball League. On 5 January 2015 he left Turów Zgorzele and signed with King Wilki Morskie Szczecin remaining on the Polish League.

On 25 October 2017 he signed with BBC Monthey for the rest of the 2017–18 Swiss Basketball League season.

== Career statistics ==
Legend
GP	Games played	GS	Games started	MPG	Minutes per game
FG%	Field-goal percentage	3P%	3-point field-goal percentage	FT%	Free-throw percentage
RPG	Rebounds per game	APG	Assists per game	SPG	Steals per game
BPG	Blocks per game	PPG	Points per game	PIR	Performance index rating
**Bold**	Career high

=== Euroleague ===
Year	Team	GP	GS	MPG	FG%	3P%	FT%	RPG	APG	SPG	BPG	PPG	PIR
2014–15	Turów	10	1	8.1	.542	.000	.647	2.4	0.3	0.0	0.1	3.7	2.8
Career		10	1	8.1	.542	.000	.647	2.4	0.3	0.0	0.1	3.7	2.8
