= Marko Šutalo =

Bosnian basketball player (born 1983)

Personal information
- Born: April 13, 1983 (age 43) Bačka Topola, SR Serbia, SFR Yugoslavia
- Listed height: 1.93 m (6 ft 4 in)

Career information
- NBA draft: 2005: undrafted
- Playing career: 1999–2020
- Position: Shooting guard

Career history
- 1999–2001: KK Topola
- 2001–2002: NIS Vojvodina
- 2002–2003: Novi Sad
- 2003–2004: NIS Vojvodina
- 2004–2008: Novi Sad
- 2008–2009: Vojvodina Srbijagas
- 2009–2012: Hemofarm
- 2012–2013: Široki
- 2013–2014: Zadar
- 2014–2015: BCM U Pitești
- 2015–2017: Dinamo București
- 2017–2019: Zrinjski Mostar
- 2019–2020: Conlog Baskets Koblenz

Career highlights
- Bosnian League champion (2018)

Marko Šutalo (Serbian Cyrillic: Марко Шутало; born April 13, 1983) is a Serbia-born Bosnian former professional basketball player. Standing at 1.94 m (6 ft 4 in), he played at the shooting guard position.

== Career ==
Šutalo began his professional career began in 1999 with KK Topola from his hometown. In the period between 2001 and 2009 he spent between two Novi Sad clubs: KK Novi Sad where he played five seasons and KK Vojvodina where he played three. Along with playing basketball he was also studied law.

He moved to Hemofarm Vršac in 2009 and spent there three years making his first performances in European competitions in the Eurocup and Euroleague qualifications. In July 2012 he moved to HKK Široki of the Bosnian-Herzegovinian League. In October 2013 he signed with the Croatian KK Zadar for the rest of the season. In July 2014, he signed with the Romanian team BCM U Pitești. In July 2015, he signed with the new promoted Romanian team Dinamo București.

During the 2008–09 season with KK Vojvodina, Šutalo made 52 per cent of his three-point attempts across 26 Adriatic League games. He later represented Bosnia and Herzegovina, where his father was born.[5]
