= Petar Popović (basketball, born 1979) =

Serbian basketball player

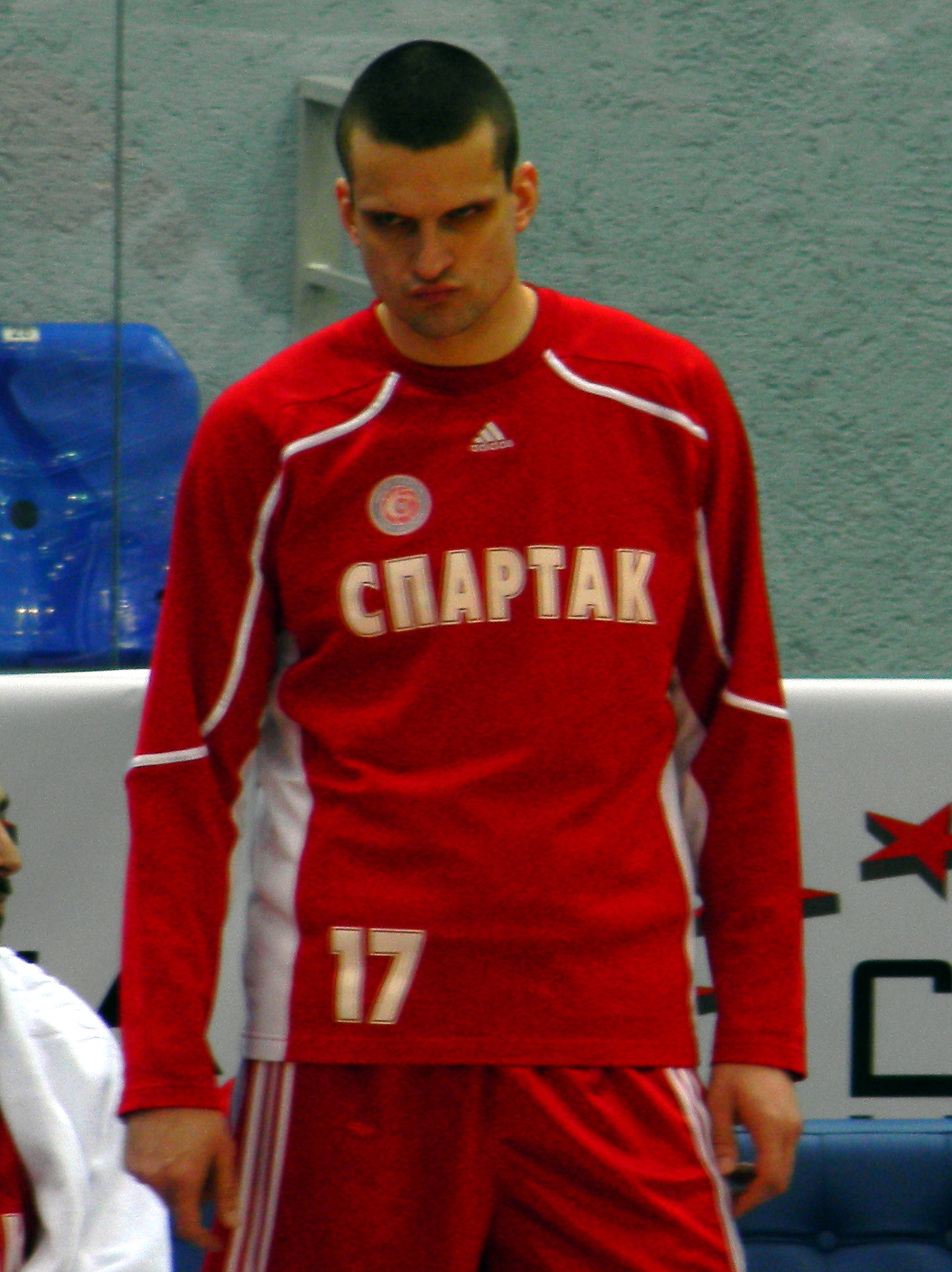

Personal information
- Born: 28 July 1979 (age 47) Belgrade, SR Serbia, SFR Yugoslavia
- Listed height: 6 ft 11 in (2.11 m)
- Listed weight: 234 lb (106 kg)

Career information
- NBA draft: 2001: undrafted
- Playing career: 1999–2014
- Position: Center

Career history
- 1999–2000: Spartak Subotica
- 2000–2001: Crvena zvezda
- 2001–2005: Hemofarm
- 2005–2006: Benetton Treviso
- 2006–2007: Crvena zvezda
- 2007–2008: Joventut Badalona
- 2008–2010: Estudiantes
- 2010–2011: Spartak Saint Petersburg
- 2011–2012: Crvena zvezda
- 2012–2013: Artland Dragons
- 2013–2014: Aliağa Petkim
- 2014: Metalac Valjevo

Career highlights
- ULEB Cup champion (2008); Adriatic League champion (2005); Italian League champion (2006); Spanish King's Cup champion (2008); Russian Cup champion (2011); Adriatic League All-Star (2007)
Medals
Representing FR Yugoslavia
Universiade
Gold medal – first place	2001 Beijing	National Team

Petar Popović (Serbian Cyrillic: Петар Поповић; born 28 July 1979) is a Serbian former professional basketball player.

== Professional career ==
He played with Spartak Subotica and Crvena zvezda before moving to Hemofarm. With them he played the next four seasons, and won the Adriatic League in 2005.

In August 2005 he signed for the Italian powerhouse Benetton Treviso. With them he won the Italian League.

For the 2006–07 season he returned to Crvena zvezda.

In September 2007, he had a trial with Joventut Badalona. He first signed a one-month contract, but later re-signed for the rest of the season. With them he won the ULEB Cup and the Spanish King's Cup.

In September 2008, he signed a short-term deal with Estudiantes, to replace injured Martin Rančík. He later resigned for the rest of the season. In July 2009, he re-signed with them for one more season.

In July 2010, he signed a one-year deal with the Russian team Spartak Saint Petersburg. With them he won the Russian Basketball Cup.

In September 2011, he returned for the third time to Crvena zvezda, signing a one-year contract.

For the 2012–13 season he signed with Artland Dragons of the German Basketball Bundesliga.

In June 2013, he signed a one-year contract with Aliağa Petkim of the Turkish Basketball League. He left them in January 2014. In March 2014, he signed with Metalac Valjevo for the rest of the season.

== National team career ==
Popović played for Serbia and Montenegro at the 2004 Olympic Basketball Tournament in Athens.
