= Steven Marković =

Australian basketball player

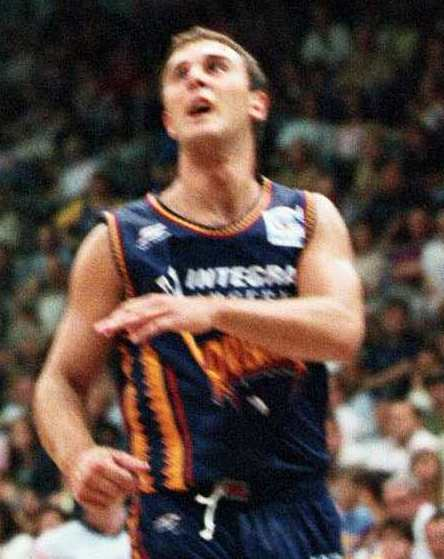
- Marković with the West Sydney Razorbacks during the 2004–05 season

Personal information
- Born: 14 March 1985 (age 41) Sydney, New South Wales
- Listed height: 190 cm (6 ft 3 in)
- Listed weight: 92 kg (203 lb)

Career information
- High school: Casula (Casula, New South Wales)
- NBA draft: 2007: undrafted
- Playing career: 2002–2016
- Position: Point guard / shooting guard
- Number: 1, 7, 10

Career history
- 2002–2005: West Sydney Razorbacks
- 2005–2008: Crvena zvezda
- 2008–2009: Benetton Treviso
- 2009: →Crvena zvezda
- 2010–2013: Radnički Kragujevac
- 2013–2015: Townsville Crocodiles
- 2015–2016: Sydney Kings

Career highlights
- Radivoj Korać Cup champion (2006); NBL Rookie of the Year (2004)

Steven Marković (born 14 March 1985) is an Australian former professional basketball player.

== Early life ==
Marković was born in the Sydney suburb of Liverpool to a Serbian father and an Italian mother.

== Professional career ==
Marković was a development player with the West Sydney Razorbacks of the National Basketball League in 2002–03 and played in a total of five games. In 2003, he attended the Australian Institute of Sport.

In 2003–04 and 2004–05, Marković was on a full contract with the Razorbacks. He won the 2004 NBL Rookie of the Year Award.

In October 2005, he moved to Serbia, spending the next three seasons with Crvena zvezda. In July 2008, Marković signed with Benetton Treviso of Italy for the 2008–09 season, before being loaned back to Crvena zvezda in February 2009.

After missing the entire 2009–10 season due to injury, Marković signed with Radnički Kragujevac in September 2010. In early May 2013, Marković was released by Radnički after three seasons following altercations with team management.

On 31 May 2013, Marković signed a two-year deal with the Townsville Crocodiles.

On 30 June 2015, Marković signed with the Sydney Kings for the 2015–16 NBL season. On 6 January 2016, he was ruled out for the rest of the season with an illness. He managed just seven games for the Kings, with his final game coming on 19 November.

== National team career ==
Marković played for Australia at the 2010 FIBA World Championship.

== See also ==
- List of KK Crvena zvezda players with 100 games played
- List of foreign basketball players in Serbia
