= Omar Thomas =

American basketball player (born 1982)

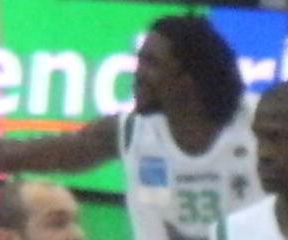

Personal information
- Born: February 27, 1982 (age 44) Philadelphia, Pennsylvania, U.S.
- Listed height: 6 ft 5 in (1.96 m)
- Listed weight: 232 lb (105 kg)

Career information
- High school: Strawberry Mansion (Philadelphia, Pennsylvania)
- College: Panola JC (2001–2003); UTEP (2003–2005)
- NBA draft: 2005: undrafted
- Playing career: 2005–2017
- Position: Shooting guard / small forward

Career history
- 2005–2006: Coca-Cola Tigers
- 2006: Austin Toros
- 2006: Club Deportivo Naco
- 2006–2008: Basket Rimini Crabs
- 2008: Élan Béarnais Pau-Orthez
- 2008–2009: Solsonica Rieti
- 2009–2010: New Basket Brindisi
- 2010–2011: Air Avellino
- 2011–2012: Crvena zvezda
- 2012–2013: Krasnye Krylia
- 2013–2014: Dinamo Sassari
- 2014–2015: Basket Ferentino
- 2015: Halcones Rojos Veracruz
- 2016: VITA Tbilisi
- 2016: Zenit Saint Petersburg
- 2016: Vanoli Cremona
- 2016–2017: Hoops Club
- 2017: Náuticos de Mazatlán

Career highlights
- Italian League MVP (2011); Italian 2nd Division MVP (2010); Serbian League Playoffs MVP (2012); Serbian League Best Scorer (2012); Russian Cup champion (2013); FIBA EuroChallenge champion (2013); Italian Cup champion (2014); First-team All-WAC (2005)

Omar Abdul Thomas (born February 27, 1982) is an American former professional basketball player.

== Early life ==
Thomas was born in Philadelphia, Pennsylvania.

He went to Strawberry Mansion High School and at Panola Junior College (Texas), passes to the University of Texas El Paso (UTEP), taking leave in 2005.

== Professional career ==
After the university, Thomas had a tryout with the Seattle SuperSonics but did not sign contract. Then he went to the Coca-Cola Tigers in the Philippines. After one year he went to the NBA Development League (NBDL) with the Austin Toros. His career continued in the Dominican Republic with the Deportivo Naco.

In 2006, he was spotted by Giampiero Ticchi who brought him to play in Italy where his first team was Rimini where he played for two seasons. During the summer of 2008, he signed an agreement with the French club Pau-Orthez, but was cut after three games. Then he went back in Italy and signed with Napoli, which debuted in Serie A. At Napoli he averaged 11.5 points and 5.7 rebounds per game. In July 2009, he signed with Brindisi of the Legadue Basket. At the end of the season, he was named the Legadue MVP.

On June 24, 2010, Thomas signed with Sidigas Avellino. In the 2010–11 season, Thomas drag the club in playoff with the fourth place overall at the end of the regular season, and won the title of MVP of the Italian League regular season, with an average of 18.0 points and 6.2 rebounds.

On 6 December 2011, the National Commission of Judges of the FIP has suspended the player for 16 months (until April 6, 2013) because he was charged with possession of false passports of Republic of Slovenia. However a few days later the player had the permission from FIBA to move to Crvena zvezda, as the disqualification of the Italian federation had no international effect. While playing with Crvena zvezda he had a good season, leading his team to the final of the playoffs in the Serbian League and the final of Kup Radivoja Koraća where they lost both times to Partizan.

On July 12, 2013, Thomas signed with Dinamo Sassari for the 2013–14 season. On August 23, 2014, he signed with FMC Ferentino of the Italian Serie A2 Basket for the 2014–15 season.

In November 2015, he signed with Halcones Rojos Veracruz of the Mexican LNBP. In late December 2015, he left Veracruz and signed with VITA Tbilisi of the VTB United League. On March 1, 2016, he left Tbilisi and signed with Zenit Saint Petersburg for the rest of the season.

On July 3, 2016, Thomas signed with Vanoli Cremona for the 2016–17 season. On November 23, 2016, he parted ways with Cremona after appearing in six games. In December 2016, he signed with Hoops Club. In 2017, he played in Mexico with the Náuticos de Mazatlán of the Circuito de Baloncesto de la Costa del Pacífico (CIBACOPA).
