= Mladen Pantić =

Serbian basketball player

Čačak 94
- Position: Center
- League: Second Basketball League of Serbia

Personal information
- Born: 31 July 1982 (age 44) Belgrade, SR Serbia, SFR Yugoslavia
- Listed height: 2.10 m (6 ft 11 in)

Career information
- NBA draft: 2004: undrafted
- Playing career: 2001–present

Career history
- 2001–2002: FMP Železnik
- 2002–2003: Lavovi 063
- 2003–2007: FMP Železnik
- 2007–2008: Alba Berlin
- 2008: Kavala
- 2009: Mega Vizura
- 2009: Keravnos
- 2009–2010: Radnički Kragujevac
- 2010–2011: Igokea
- 2011–2012: Hemofarm
- 2012: Dnipro
- 2012: Borac Čačak
- 2013: Ikaros Kallitheas
- 2013: Levski Sofia
- 2013–2014: Kryvbas
- 2014: Borac Čačak
- 2014: Kolossos Rodou
- 2014–2015: CSM Oradea
- 2016: CSU Craiova
- 2016: Mornar Bar
- 2017: Feni Industries
- 2018: Zlatibor
- 2018–2020: Bratunac
- 2020–2021: Pirot
- 2021–present: Čačak 94
Medals
Men's basketball
Representing Serbia and Montenegro
Summer Universiade
Gold medal – first place	2003 Daegu

Mladen Pantić (Serbian Cyrillic: Младен Пантић; born 31 July 1982) is a Serbian professional basketball player for Čačak 94 of the Second Basketball League of Serbia.

== Professional career ==
He grew up with Železnik (Yugoslavia) juniors, he has been a member of the Yugoslav Junior National Team, played at 2002 European Under-20 Championship, Pantić was also a member of the team that represented Serbia & Montenegro at the 2003 Summer Universiade in Daegu, finishing as the gold medal winners.

He won the 2005 and 2007 Serbian National Cup with FMP Železnik, won the 2006 Goodyear League with Železnik, won the gold medal at the 2003 Summer Universiade. Won the 2008 Basketball Bundesliga with Alba Berlin.

On 9 March 2017, he signed for Macedonian club Feni Industries. On 2 October 2020, Pantić signed for Pirot of the Second Basketball League of Serbia. In August 2021, Pantić signed for Čačak 94.
