= 2007–08 KK Partizan season =

Basketball season

Partizan Belgrade
2007–08 season
- President: Predrag Danilović
- Head coach: Duško Vujošević
- Basketball League of Serbia: Champion
- Radivoj Korać Cup: Champion
- Adriatic League: Champion
- Euroleague: Quarterfinals
- Highest home attendance: vs TAU Cerámica (7,123)

In the 2007–08 season, Partizan Belgrade will compete in the Basketball League of Serbia, Radivoj Korać Cup, Adriatic League and Euroleague.

== Players ==
=== Roster ===
KK Partizan roster
Players
Coaches

Pos.	No.	Nat.	Name	Ht.	Wt.	Age
G	4	(Belize)	Palacio, Milt	1.93 m (6 ft 4 in)	95 kg (209 lb)	48 – 7 February 1978
G	5	(Serbia)	Tepić, Milenko	2.02 m (6 ft 8 in)	102 kg (225 lb)	39 – 27 February 1987
G	6	(Serbia)	Riznić, Bogdan	2.01 m (6 ft 7 in)	80 kg (176 lb)	36 – 24 February 1990
G	7	(Serbia)	Kecman, Dušan	1.97 m (6 ft 6 in)	93 kg (205 lb)	48 – 6 November 1977
C	9	(Serbia)	Balaban, Darko	2.10 m (6 ft 11 in)	105 kg (231 lb)	37 – 22 February 1989
F	10	(Serbia)	Borovnjak, Dejan	2.09 m (6 ft 10 in)	104 kg (229 lb)	40 – 1 April 1986
G	11	(Serbia)	Tripković, Uroš	1.96 m (6 ft 5 in)	88 kg (194 lb)	39 – 11 September 1986
F	12	(Serbia)	Veličković, Novica	2.05 m (6 ft 9 in)	109 kg (240 lb)	39 – 5 October 1986
C	14	(Montenegro)	Peković, Nikola	2.11 m (6 ft 11 in)	139 kg (306 lb)	40 – 3 January 1986
F	15	(Serbia)	Vitkovac, Čedomir	2.01 m (6 ft 7 in)	102 kg (225 lb)	43 – 28 October 1982
F	17	(Serbia)	Djurković, Marko	2.06 m (6 ft 9 in)	105 kg (231 lb)	39 – 24 February 1987
G	20	(Serbia)	Božić, Petar (C)	1.97 m (6 ft 6 in)	100 kg (220 lb)	47 – 6 December 1978
F	21	(Serbia)	Milošević, Strahinja	2.03 m (6 ft 8 in)	104 kg (229 lb)	40 – 25 September 1985
C	33	(Montenegro)	Vraneš, Slavko	2.29 m (7 ft 6 in)	135 kg (298 lb)	43 – 30 January 1983

Head coach

- (Serbia) Duško Vujošević

Legend

- (C) Team captain
- Injured

- Roster

=== Roster changes ===
In

- (Belize) Milt Palacio (from (United States) Utah Jazz)
- (Serbia) Bogdan Riznić (from youth categories)
- (Serbia) Čedomir Vitkovac (from (Serbia) Vojvodina)
- (Serbia) Strahinja Milošević (from (Serbia) Vojvodina)
- (Montenegro) Slavko Vraneš (from (Montenegro) Budućnost Podgorica)
- (Serbia) Darko Balaban (from youth categories)

Out

- (Serbia) Luka Bogdanović (to (France) Le Mans)
- (Montenegro) Boris Bakić (to (Serbia) Crvena zvezda)
- (Montenegro) Predrag Drobnjak (to (Spain) Akasvayu Girona)
- (Serbia) Kosta Perović (to (United States) Golden State Warriors)
- (United States) Vonteego Cummings (to (Israel) Maccabi Tel Aviv)

== Competitions ==
	Competition	Position	Record
(Serbia)	Basketball League of Serbia	Winners	17–3
(Serbia)	Radivoj Korać Cup	Winners	3–0
(European Union)	Adriatic League	Winners	28–2
(European Union)	Euroleague	Quarterfinals	11–12

== Basketball League of Serbia ==
=== Regular season ===
Pos	Team	Total						
		P	W	L	F	A	D	Pts
1	Partizan Belgrade	14	12	2	1177	978	(+)199	26
2	FMP	14	12	2	1269	1110	(+)159	26
3	Hemofarm	14	9	5	1087	970	(+)117	23
4	Crvena zvezda	14	9	5	1220	1172	(+)48	23
5	Vojvodina Srbijagas	14	7	7	1042	1054	(-)12	21
6	Lions	14	4	10	1061	1122	(-)61	18
7	Borac	14	2	12	1009	1241	(-)232	16
8	Vizura	14	1	13	990	1208	(-)218	15

14 May 2008* 1	Partizan Belgrade	98–86	FMP	Belgrade
	Scoring by quarter: 20-25, 30-23, 23-17, 25-21
	Pts: Peković 30	Report	Pts: Labović 23	Arena: Pionir Hall

17 May 2008* 2	Partizan Belgrade	91–70	Lions	Belgrade
	Scoring by quarter: 21-25, 28-17, 22-19, 20-9
	Pts: Kecman 16	Report	Pts: Marković 16	Arena: Pionir Hall

13 April 2008 3	Vojvodina	60–66	Partizan Belgrade	Novi Sad
	Scoring by quarter: 17-16, 11-17, 16-18, 16-15
	Pts: Paunić, Bajić 12	Report	Pts: Palacio 11	Arena: SPENS

16 April 2008 4	Partizan Belgrade	88–57	Vizura	Belgrade
	Scoring by quarter: 16-16, 25-13, 24-20, 23-8
	Pts: Milošević 15	Report	Pts: Lučić 16	Arena: Pionir Hall

19 April 2008 5	Crvena zvezda	78–83	Partizan Belgrade	Belgrade
	Scoring by quarter: 20-17, 26-27, 13-15, 19-24
	Pts: Subotić, Kikanović 16	Report	Pts: Veličković 21	Arena: Pionir Hall

22 April 2008 6	Partizan Belgrade	84–79	Hemofarm	Belgrade
	Scoring by quarter: 28-21, 22-18, 17-15, 17-25
	Pts: Tripković 29	Report	Pts: Marshall 22	Arena: Pionir Hall

30 April 2008 7	Borac Čačak	68–90	Partizan Belgrade	Čačak
	Scoring by quarter: 8-27, 27-26, 15-21, 18-16
	Pts: Ilić 16	Report	Pts: Vraneš 16	Arena: Borac Hall

3 May 2008 8	FMP	71–69	Partizan Belgrade	Belgrade
	Scoring by quarter: 20-20, 16-20, 12-17, 23-12
	Pts: Erceg 27	Report	Pts: Peković 19	Arena: Železnik Hall

7 May 2008 9	Lions	59–74	Partizan Belgrade	Vršac
	Scoring by quarter: 19-15, 19-25, 16-20, 5-14
	Pts: Dragojlović, Marković 12	Report	Pts: Tepić 14

10 May 2008 10	Partizan Belgrade	89–68	Vojvodina	Belgrade
	Scoring by quarter: 14-20, 23-17, 30-20, 22-11
	Pts: Tepić 14	Report	Pts: Németh 18	Arena: Pionir Hall

21 May 2008 11	Vizura	74–92	Partizan Belgrade	Belgrade
	Scoring by quarter: 13-22, 24-26, 17-20, 20-24
	Pts: Karić 12	Report	Pts: Peković 21	Arena: Vizura Sports Center

25 May 2008 12	Partizan Belgrade	86–77	Crvena zvezda	Belgrade
	Scoring by quarter: 20-21, 17-17, 29-20, 20-19
	Pts: Peković 22	Report	Pts: Dragićević 17	Arena: Pionir Hall

28 May 2008 13	Hemofarm	74–70	Partizan Belgrade	Vršac
	Scoring by quarter: 18-21, 21-11, 14-18, 21-20
	Pts: Marshall 28	Report	Pts: Tepić 18	Arena: Millennium Center

31 May 2008 14	Partizan Belgrade	97–57	Borac Čačak	Belgrade
	Scoring by quarter: 26-13, 26-17, 27-16, 18-11
	Pts: Tripković 14		Pts: Ilić 17	Arena: Pionir Hall

==== Semifinals ====
3 June 2008	Partizan Belgrade	93–73 (Series: 1–0)	Crvena zvezda	Belgrade
	Scoring by quarter: 26-15, 15-15, 24-16, 18-17
	Pts: Peković 26	Report	Pts: Lekić 13	Arena: Pionir Hall

6 June 2008	Crvena zvezda	80–89 (Series: 0–2)	Partizan Belgrade	Belgrade
	Scoring by quarter: 21-21, 15-29, 25-16, 19-23
	Pts: Cook 21	Report	Pts: Peković 20	Arena: Pionir Hall

==== Final ====
12 June 2008	Partizan Belgrade	68–54 (Series: 1–0)	Hemofarm	Belgrade
	Scoring by quarter: 13-10, 18-17, 16-15, 21-12
	Pts: Tepić 18	Report	Pts: Joksimović 15	Arena: Pionir Hall

14 June 2008	Hemofarm	88–84 (Series: 1–1)	Partizan Belgrade	Vršac
	Scoring by quarter: 20-21, 18-11, 24-19, 26-33
	Pts: Marshall 27	Report	Pts: Palacio 22	Arena: Millennium Center

16 June 2008	Partizan Belgrade	76–65 (Series: 2–1)	Hemofarm	Belgrade
	Scoring by quarter: 21-12, 14-21, 23-16, 18-16
	Pts: Peković 25	Report	Pts: Vukosavljević 20	Arena: Pionir Hall

18 June 2008	Hemofarm	45–67 (Series: 1–3)	Partizan Belgrade	Vršac
	Scoring by quarter: 10-15, 11-22, 9-11, 15-19
	Pts: Božović 11	Report	Pts: Palacio 15	Arena: Millennium Center

== Adriatic League ==
=== Standings ===
	Team	Pld	W	L	PF	PA	Diff	Pts
1.	Partizan Belgrade	26	24	2	2119	1855	+264	50
2.	Zadar	26	18	8	2080	2001	+79	44
3.	Hemofarm STADA	26	16	10	2063	1986	+77	42
4.	Crvena zvezda	26	16	10	2275	2212	+63	42

=== Regular season ===
3 October 2007 1	Partizan Belgrade (Serbia)	74–67	(Serbia) Vojvodina	Belgrade
	Scoring by quarter: 15–10, 24–14, 20–26, 22–15
	Pts: Peković 17	Report	Pts: Németh 16	Arena: Pionir Hall

7 October 2007 2	Partizan Belgrade (Serbia)	109–65	(Croatia) Zagreb	Belgrade
	Scoring by quarter: 21–14, 31–12, 31–19, 26–20
	Pts: Veličković 20	Report	Pts: Vladović 14	Arena: Pionir Hall

10 October 2007 3	FMP (Serbia)	90–80	(Serbia) Partizan Belgrade	Belgrade
	Scoring by quarter: 22–15, 22–27, 22–20, 24–18
	Pts: Samardžiski 26	Report	Pts: Peković 20	Arena: Železnik Hall

13 October 2007 4	Slovan (Slovenia)	61–81	(Serbia) Partizan Belgrade	Ljubljana
	Scoring by quarter: 21–26, 7–16, 12–24, 21–15
	Pts: Jovanović 19	Report	Pts: Palacio 16	Arena: Kodeljevo Hall

15 October 2007 5	Helios (Slovenia)	54–71	(Serbia) Partizan Belgrade	Domžale
	Scoring by quarter: 14–21, 12–15, 18–13, 10–22
	Pts: Zagorac 11	Report	Pts: Tepić, Veličković 13	Arena: Komunalni center Hall

20 October 2007 6	Partizan Belgrade (Serbia)	81–71	(Croatia) Zadar	Belgrade
	Scoring by quarter: 20–25, 21–8, 20–20, 20–18
	Pts: Tepić 16	Report	Pts: Lalić 19	Arena: Pionir Hall

27 October 2007 7	Hemofarm (Serbia)	76–79(OT)	(Serbia) Partizan Belgrade	Vršac
	Scoring by quarter: 21–8, 17–25, 15–17, 15–18, Overtime: 8–11
	Pts: Jagodnik 16	Report	Pts: Palacio 19	Arena: Millennium Center

3 November 2007 8	Partizan Belgrade (Serbia)	82–67	(Serbia) Crvena zvezda	Belgrade
	Scoring by quarter: 18–17, 22–14, 20–16, 22–20
	Pts: Peković 23	Report	Pts: Cook 24	Arena: Pionir Hall

11 November 2007 9	Cibona (Croatia)	77–78	(Serbia) Partizan Belgrade	Zagreb
	Scoring by quarter: 14–20, 15–11, 24–25, 25–21
	Pts: Hoskin 18	Report	Pts: Peković 15	Arena: Dražen Petrović Basketball Hall

17 November 2007 10	Partizan Belgrade (Serbia)	85–80	(Montenegro) Budućnost	Belgrade
	Scoring by quarter: 20–21, 17–16, 26–18, 22–25
	Pts: Tepić 19	Report	Pts: Bakić 15	Arena: Pionir Hall

24 November 2007 11	Union Olimpija (Slovenia)	60–83	(Serbia) Partizan Belgrade	Ljubljana
	Scoring by quarter: 14–20, 11–23, 18–15, 17–25
	Pts: Dragić 16	Report	Pts: Peković 16	Arena: Tivoli Hall

1 December 2007 12	Partizan Belgrade (Serbia)	81–71	(Bosnia and Herzegovina) Široki	Belgrade
	Scoring by quarter: 20–16, 21–20, 18–16, 22–19
	Pts: Peković 20	Report	Pts: Pedroza 20	Arena: Pionir Hall

9 December 2007 13	Split (Croatia)	69–84	(Serbia) Partizan Belgrade	Split
	Scoring by quarter: 17–10, 21–29, 22–27, 9–18
	Pts: Garnetz 19	Report	Pts: Peković 33	Arena: Arena Gripe

15 December 2007 14	Vojvodina (Serbia)	84–86	(Serbia) Partizan Belgrade	Novi Sad
	Scoring by quarter: 22–18, 15–23, 21–22, 26–23
	Pts: Đorđević 21	Report	Pts: Palacio 23	Arena: SPENS

23 December 2007 15	Zagreb (Croatia)	76–78	(Serbia) Partizan Belgrade	Zagreb
	Scoring by quarter: 17–18, 21–19, 14–19, 24–22
	Pts: Tomić 16	Report	Pts: Palacio 21	Arena: Trnsko Sports Hall

5 January 2008 16	Partizan Belgrade (Serbia)	90–68	(Serbia) FMP	Belgrade
	Scoring by quarter: 23–17, 19–19, 26–12, 22–20
	Pts: Tripković 16	Report	Pts: Erceg 15	Arena: Pionir Hall

13 January 2008 17	Partizan Belgrade (Serbia)	87–74	(Slovenia) Slovan	Belgrade
	Scoring by quarter: 20–19, 21–19, 18–19, 28–17
	Pts: Veličković 21	Report	Pts: Johnson 15	Arena: Pionir Hall

19 January 2008 18	Partizan Belgrade (Serbia)	86–76	(Slovenia) Helios	Belgrade
	Scoring by quarter: 20–17, 25–22, 18–21, 23–16
	Pts: Tepić 15	Report	Pts: Troha 24	Arena: Pionir Hall

26 January 2008 19	Zadar (Croatia)	70–54	(Serbia) Partizan Belgrade	Zadar
	Scoring by quarter: 28–16, 15–11, 9–13, 18–14
	Pts: Brewer 18	Report	Pts: Palacio 16	Arena: Jazine Basketball Hall

3 February 2008 20	Partizan Belgrade (Serbia)	89–86	(Serbia) Hemofarm	Belgrade
	Scoring by quarter: 18–13, 21–27, 29–24, 21–22
	Pts: Veličković 15	Report	Pts: Joksimović 19	Arena: Pionir Hall

17 February 2008 21	Crvena zvezda (Serbia)	81–88	(Serbia) Partizan Belgrade	Belgrade
	Scoring by quarter: 22–21, 17–18, 16–16, 26–33
	Pts: Cook 26	Report	Pts: Palacio 24	Arena: Pionir Hall

22 March 2008* 22	Partizan Belgrade (Serbia)	84–63	(Croatia) Cibona	Belgrade
	Scoring by quarter: 20–18, 20–19, 21–17, 23–9
	Pts: Tripković 22	Report	Pts: Warren 17	Arena: Pionir Hall

1 March 2008 23	Budućnost (Montenegro)	64–68	(Serbia) Partizan Belgrade	Podgorica
	Scoring by quarter: 14–18, 22–21, 10–15, 18–14
	Pts: Gordić 12	Report	Pts: Palacio 18	Arena: Morača Sports Center

8 March 2008 24	Partizan Belgrade (Serbia)	86–81	(Slovenia) Union Olimpija	Belgrade
	Scoring by quarter: 16–20, 26–15, 17–15, 27–31
	Pts: Peković 20	Report	Pts: Bailey 20	Arena: Pionir Hall

15 March 2008 25	Široki (Bosnia and Herzegovina)	59–70	(Serbia) Partizan Belgrade	Široki Brijeg
	Scoring by quarter: 20–17, 12–14, 10–17, 17–22
	Pts: Dijan 21	Report	Pts: Tripković 13	Arena: Pecara

23 March 2008 26	Partizan Belgrade (Serbia)	78–67	(Croatia) Split	Belgrade
	Scoring by quarter: 18–11, 16–17, 16–18, 28–21
	Pts: Tripković 28	Report	Pts: Stipanović 17	Arena: Pionir Hall

=== Playoffs ===
25 March 2008	Partizan Belgrade (Serbia)	90–80 (Series: 1–0)	(Croatia) Cibona	Belgrade
20:00	Scoring by quarter: 24–26, 22–15, 17–14, 27–25
	Pts: Peković 19; Rebs: Peković 7 Asts: Palacio 5	Report	Pts: Warren 19; Rebs: Hoskin 6 Asts: Mulaomerović 4	Arena: Pionir Hall; Attendance: 4,115; Referees: Zoran Šutulović (MNE), Roman Kolar (SLO), Zdravko Rutešić (MNE)

27 March 2008	Cibona (Croatia)	93–100 (Series: 0–2)	(Serbia) Partizan Belgrade	Zagreb
20:00	Scoring by quarter: 21–26, 23–23, 24–27, 25–24
	Pts: Williams 26; Rebs: Hoskin 9 Asts: Warren, Mulaomerović 4	Report	Pts: Tripković 26; Rebs: Peković 8 Asts: Palacio 8	Arena: Dražen Petrović Basketball Hall; Attendance: 2,000; Referees: Sašo Pukl (SLO), Nikola Lepetić (MNE), Milija Vojinović (SRB)

=== Final four ===
Semifinals; April 25.
1	Partizan Belgrade	94
5	Union Olimpija	90
2	Zadar	72
3	Hemofarm STADA	81

Final; April 26.
1	Partizan Belgrade	69
3	Hemofarm STADA	51

==== Semifinals ====
25 April 2008	Union Olimpija (Slovenia)	90–94	(Serbia) Partizan Belgrade	Ljubljana
20:45 CET	Scoring by quarter: 22–25, 23–16, 16–27, 29–26
	Pts: Bailey 24; Rebs: Zupan 7 Asts: Bailey 3	Report	Pts: Peković 31; Rebs: Veličković 6 Asts: Palacio, Kecman 3	Arena: Hala Tivoli; Attendance: 5,500; Referees: Muhvić (CRO), Dožai (CRO), Radović (CRO)

==== Final ====
26 April 2008	Partizan Belgrade (Serbia)	69–51	(Serbia) Hemofarm	Ljubljana
20:45 CET	Scoring by quarter: 18–15, 22–12, 19–11, 10–13
	Pts: Peković, 22; Rebs: Peković 7 Asts: Palacio 3	Report	Pts: Marković 11; Rebs: Marjanović 7 Asts: Pavković 3	Arena: Hala Tivoli; Attendance: 2,000; Referees: Belošević (SRB), Pukl (SLO), Šutulović (MNE)

== Kup Radivoja Koraća ==
Quarterfinals

8 February 2008	Partizan Belgrade	83–68	Swisslion Vršac	Niš
	Scoring by quarter: 25–16, 16–10, 26–20, 16–22
	Pts: Veličković 18		Pts: Mladenović 20	Arena: Čair Sports Center

Semifinals

9 February 2008	Partizan Belgrade	85–73	FMP	Niš
	Scoring by quarter: 20–20, 28–14, 16–24, 21–15
	Pts: Tepić 27		Pts: Protić 15	Arena: Čair Sports Center; Attendance: 3,200

Final

10 February 2008	Partizan Belgrade	73–64	Hemofarm	Niš
	Scoring by quarter: 22–9, 16–19, 17–17, 18–19
	Pts: Kecman 15		Pts: Mačvan 14	Arena: Čair Sports Center; Attendance: 5,000

== Euroleague ==
=== Regular season ===
==== Group C ====
	Team	Pld	W	L	PF	PA	Diff
1.	(Greece) Panathinaikos	14	12	2	1156	1037	+119
2.	(Spain) Real Madrid	14	11	3	1137	1015	+122
3.	(Spain) AXA FC Barcelona	14	9	5	1082	991	+91
4.	(Turkey) Fenerbahçe	14	6	8	1087	1103	−26
5.	(Serbia) Partizan Belgrade	14	6	8	1100	1103	−3
6.	(Italy) Lottomatica Roma	14	6	8	1071	1093	−22
7.	(France) Roanne	14	4	10	1104	1224	−120
8.	(Germany) Brose Baskets	14	2	12	879	1040	−161

Win Loss

24 October 2007	Partizan Belgrade (Serbia)	81–78	(Spain) Barcelona	Belgrade, Serbia
20:45	Scoring by quarter: 15–20, 27–21, 20–13, 19–24
	Pts: Peković 29; Rebs: Peković, Veličković 8 Asts: Palacio 4	Report	Pts: Lakovič 21; Rebs: İlyasova 5 Asts: Sánchez 9	Arena: Pionir Hall; Attendance: 6,137; Referees: Koukoulekidis Stelios (GRE), Sahin Tolga (ITA), Anastopoulos Panagiotis (GRE)

31 October 2007	Roanne (France)	87–88	(Serbia) Partizan Belgrade	Clermont-Ferrand, France
20:30	Scoring by quarter: 23–23, 12–21, 28–26, 24–18
	Pts: Rush 29; Rebs: Salyers 9 Asts: Pellin 5	Report	Pts: Peković 23; Rebs: Peković 7 Asts: Palacio 6	Arena: Maison des Sports; Attendance: 5,000; Referees: Facchini Fabio (ITA), Rocha Fernando (POR), Paternico Carmelo (ITA)

7 November 2007	Partizan Belgrade (Serbia)	90–94	(Greece) Panathinaikos	Belgrade, Serbia
20:45	Scoring by quarter: 16–24, 25–22, 29–23, 20–25
	Pts: Peković 28; Rebs: Peković 10; Asts: Tepić 4	Report	Pts: Diamantidis, Bečirovič 16; Rebs: Diamantidis 6 Asts: Spanoulis 3	Arena: Pionir Hall; Attendance: 6,825; Referees: Mitjana Juan Carlos (ESP), Ziemblicki Grzegorz (POL), Taurino Paolo (ITA)

14 November 2007	Real Madrid (Spain)	75–64	(Serbia) Partizan Belgrade	Madrid, Spain
20:30	Scoring by quarter: 20–11, 13–10, 26–21, 16–22
	Pts: Bullock 15; Rebs: Reyes 11; Asts: López, Papadopoulos 3	Report	Pts: Palacio 24; Rebs: Tepić 7 Asts: Tepić, Kecman 3	Arena: Palacio Vistalegre; Attendance: 7,900; Referees: Jungebrand Carl (FIN), Lovsin Andrej (SLO), Chiari, Roberto (ITA)

21 November 2007	Partizan Belgrade (Serbia)	91–86	(Italy) Lottomatica Roma	Belgrade, Serbia
20:45	Scoring by quarter: 25–26, 29–25, 18–19, 19–16
	Pts: Peković 21; Rebs: Veličković 10; Asts: Palacio 6	Report	Pts: Stefánsson 16; Rebs: Lorbek Hawkins 5 Asts: Stefánsson, Ray 2	Arena: Pionir Hall; Attendance: 5,245; Referees: Ortiz de Zárate José Manuel (ESP), Christodoulou Christos (GRE), Viator Eddie (FRA)

28 November 2007	Brose Baskets (Germany)	78–62	(Serbia) Partizan Belgrade	Bamberg, Germany
20:45	Scoring by quarter: 22–12, 19–15, 16–21, 21–14
	Pts: Greene 18; Rebs: Okulaja 10; Asts: Šuput, Okulaja 3	Report	Pts: Kecman 20; Rebs: Veličković 13; Asts: Palacio 4	Arena: Jako Arena; Attendance: 6,800; Referees: Amoros Xavier (ESP) Cerebuch Guerrino (ITA), Ozols Arnis (LAT)

5 December 2007	Partizan Belgrade (Serbia)	72–76	(Turkey) Fenerbahçe	Belgrade, Serbia
20:45	Scoring by quarter: 16–20, 18–15, 18–20, 20–21
	Pts: Peković 26; Rebs: Veličković 7 Asts: Palacio 6	Report	Pts: Solomon 21; Rebs: Erden 5 Asts: Solomon 5	Arena: Pionir Hall; Attendance: 6,528; Referees: Bachar Shmuel (ISR), Spiridonos Leonidas (GRE), Perez Perez Miguel (ESP)

13 December 2007	Barcelona (Spain)	95–69	(Serbia) Partizan Belgrade	Barcelona, Spain
20:45	Scoring by quarter: 28–14, 19–22, 18–15, 30–18
	Pts: Grimau 19; Rebs: Kasun 7 Asts: Lakovič 4	Report	Pts: Tripković 16; Rebs: Vitkovac 8 Asts: Palacio 3	Arena: Palau Blaugrana; Attendance: 3,427; Referees: Drabikovsky Volodymr (UKR), Chambon David (FRA), Piloidis Anastasios (GRE)

19 December 2007	Partizan Belgrade (Serbia)	82–76	(France) Roanne	Belgrade, Serbia
20:45	Scoring by quarter: 14–30, 26–21, 20–13, 22–12
	Pts: Peković 26; Rebs: Peković 16; Asts: Tepić, Veličković 4	Report	Pts: Rush 15; Rebs: Salyers 10; Asts: Salyers 3	Arena: Pionir Hall; Attendance: 0 Referees: Arteaga Juan Carlos (ESP), Chiari Roberto (ITA), Mikhaylov Sergey (RUS)

2 January 2008	Panathinaikos (Greece)	67–66	(Serbia) Partizan Belgrade	Athens, Greece
19:45	Scoring by quarter: 16–15, 17–14, 22–14, 12–23
	Pts: Jasikevičius 17; Rebs: Batiste 6 Asts: Diamantidis 4	Report	Pts: Kecman 22; Rebs: Peković 13; Asts: Peković 2	Arena: Olympic Indoor Hall; Attendance: 9,500; Referees: Drabikovsky Volodymr (UKR), Chambon David (FRA), Piloidis Anastasios (GRE)

10 January 2008	Partizan Belgrade (Serbia)	72–80	(Spain) Real Madrid	Belgrade, Serbia
20:45	Scoring by quarter: 17–21, 21–20, 15–20, 19–19
	Pts: Palacio, Kecman 13; Rebs: Peković 7 Asts: Palacio 4	Report	Pts: Reyes 15; Rebs: Mumbrú 6 Asts: Tunçeri 4	Arena: Pionir Hall; Attendance: 6,753; Referees: Zavlanos Nikolaos (GRE), Ankarali Recep (TUR), Latisevs Olegs (LAT)

16 January 2008	Lottomatica Roma (Italy)	88–87(OT)	(Serbia) Partizan Belgrade	Rome, Italy
20:30	Scoring by quarter: 22–25, 18–11, 25–22, 15–22, Overtime: 8–7
	Pts: Ukić 23; Rebs: De la Fuente 9 Asts: Ukić 4	Report	Pts: Veličković 22; Rebs: Veličković 9 Asts: Tepić 3	Arena: PalaLottomatica; Attendance: 5,113; Referees: Martin Jose (ESP), Gkontas Spiros (GRE), Jasevicius Tomas (LTU)

24 January 2008	Partizan Belgrade (Serbia)	85–37	(Germany) Brose Baskets	Belgrade, Serbia
20:45	Scoring by quarter: 14–10, 28–8, 21–10, 22–9
	Pts: Veličković 17; Rebs: Veličković 13; Asts: Kecman 4	Report	Pts: Okulaja 11; Rebs: Okulaja, Šuput 6 Asts: Okulaja 3	Arena: Pionir Hall; Attendance: 6,573; Referees: Brazauskas Romualdas (LTU), Ryzhyk Borys (UKR), Rocha Fernando (POR)

31 January 2008	Fenerbahçe (Turkey)	86–91	(Serbia) Partizan Belgrade	Istanbul, Turkey
20:00	Scoring by quarter: 27–18, 12–27, 26–22, 21–24
	Pts: Solomon 22; Rebs: Aşık 9 Asts: Solomon 6	Report	Pts: Peković 20; Rebs: Peković 10; Asts: Palacio 9	Arena: Abdi İpekçi Arena; Attendance: 5,000; Referees: Pitsilkas Nikolaos (GRE), Mitjana Juan Carlos (ESP), Sabetta Enrico (ITA)

=== Top 16 ===
==== Group D ====
	Team	Pld	W	L	PF	PA	Diff
1.	(Italy) Montepaschi Siena	6	4	2	465	427	+38
2.	(Serbia) Partizan Belgrade	6	4	2	440	430	+10
3.	(Greece) Panathinaikos	6	3	3	430	446	−16
4.	(Turkey) Efes Pilsen	6	1	5	426	458	−32

14 February 2008	Montepaschi Siena (Italy)	71–54	(Serbia) Partizan Belgrade	Siena, Italy
20:30	Scoring by quarter: 16–9, 17–18, 15–9, 23–18
	Pts: Lavrinovič 18; Rebs: Stonerook 5 Asts: McIntyre 5	Report	Pts: Peković 13; Rebs: Peković 8 Asts: Palacio, Tripković, Veličković 2	Arena: Palasport Mens Sana; Attendance: 4,613; Referees: Jungebrand, Carl (FIN), Christodoulou, Christos (GRE), Viator, Eddie (FRA)

20 February 2008	Panathinaikos (Greece)	67–65	(Serbia) Partizan Belgrade	Athens, Greece
19:45	Scoring by quarter: 21–23, 13–17, 15–16, 18–9
	Pts: Spanoulis 20; Rebs: Batiste 12; Asts: Spanoulis 3	Report	Pts: Kecman 13; Rebs: Vitkovac 7 Asts: Peković 3	Arena: Olympic Indoor Hall; Attendance: 10,500; Referees: Arteaga, Juan Carlos (ESP), Herceg, Siniša (CRO), Paternico, Carmelo (ITA)

28 February 2008	Partizan Belgrade (Serbia)	78–65	(Turkey) Efes Pilsen	Belgrade, Serbia
20:45	Scoring by quarter: 19–20, 20–8, 13–15, 26–22
	Pts: Peković 20; Rebs: Kecman 8 Asts: Kecman, Palacio, Tepić 4	Report	Pts: Gregory 19; Rebs: Gönlüm 7 Asts: Gönlüm, Kurtoğlu, Penn 3	Arena: Pionir Hall; Attendance: 6,538; Referees: Lamonica, Luigi (ITA), Ziemblicki, Grzegorz (POL), Perez Pizarro, Emilio (ESP)

5 March 2008	Partizan Belgrade (Serbia)	78–75	(Italy) Montepaschi Siena	Belgrade, Serbia
18:45	Scoring by quarter: 16–13, 16–21, 15–20, 31–21
	Pts: Palacio 26; Rebs: Peković 7 Asts: Veličković 4	Report	Pts: McIntyre, Eze 16; Rebs: Eze 5 Asts: McIntyre 4	Arena: Pionir Hall; Attendance: 6,528; Referees: Mitjana, Juan Carlos (ESP), Perez Perez, Miguel (ESP), Pilipauskas, Kestutis (LTU)

13 March 2008	Efes Pilsen (Turkey)	79–83	(Serbia) Partizan Belgrade	Istanbul, Turkey
19:15	Scoring by quarter: 19–24, 10–14, 18–30, 32–15
	Pts: Penn 33; Rebs: Gönlüm 13; Asts: Penn 4	Report	Pts: Peković 22; Rebs: Kecman 7 Asts: Kecman, Palacio, Tepić 3	Arena: Abdi İpekçi Arena; Attendance: 4,500; Referees: Amoros, Xavier (ESP), Garcia Ortiz, Jose Ramon (ESP), Ryzhyk, Borys (UKR)

19 March 2008	Partizan Belgrade (Serbia)	82–73	(Greece) Panathinaikos	Belgrade, Serbia
20:15	Scoring by quarter: 26–17, 16–20, 18–18, 22–18
	Pts: Palacio 24; Rebs: Kecman 13; Asts: Kecman 5	Report	Pts: Jasikevičius 20; Rebs: Diamantidis 5 Asts: Spanoulis, Diamantidis 3	Arena: Pionir Hall; Attendance: 7,028; Referees: Facchini, Fabio (ITA), Arteaga, Juan Carlos (ESP), bachar, Shmuel (ISR)

==== Quarterfinals ====
1 April 2008	TAU Cerámica (Spain)	74–66 (Series: 1–0)	(Serbia) Partizan Belgrade	Vitoria-Gasteiz, Spain
20:15	Scoring by quarter: 18–16, 18–22, 20–12, 18–16
	Pts: Planinić 18; Rebs: Mickeal 7 Asts: Vidal 1	Report	Pts: Kecman 13; Rebs: Veličković 8 Asts: Palacio 4	Arena: Fernando Buesa Arena; Attendance: 8,400; Referees: Jungebrand, Carl (FIN), Cerebuch, Guerrino (ITA), Rocha, Fernando (POR)

3 April 2008	Partizan Belgrade (Serbia)	76–55 (Series: 1–1)	(Spain) TAU Cerámica	Belgrade, Serbia
20:00	Scoring by quarter: 25–15, 11–16, 18–17, 22–7
	Pts: Peković 19; Rebs: Veličković 12; Asts: Palacio, Veličković 4	Report	Pts: Rakočević 15; Rebs: Singleton 6 Asts: Prigioni 5	Arena: Pionir Hall; Attendance: 7,123; Referees: Voreadis, Lazaros (GRE), Ankarali, Recep (TUR), Ryzhyk, Borys (UKR)

9 April 2008	TAU Cerámica (Spain)	85–68 (Series: 2–1)	(Serbia) Partizan Belgrade	Vitoria-Gasteiz, Spain
20:30	Scoring by quarter: 16–19, 22–13, 22–21, 25–15
	Pts: Mickeal 19; Rebs: Splitter 9 Asts: Prigioni 3	Report	Pts: Tripković 16; Rebs: Kecman 7 Asts: Tripković 3	Arena: Fernando Buesa Arena; Attendance: 9,700; Referees: Pitsilkas, Nikolaos (GRE), Zavlanos, Nikolaos (GRE), Sahin, Tolga (ITA)

== Individual awards ==
Euroleague

All-EuroLeague Team

- (Montenegro) Nikola Peković, All-Euroleague Second Team

EuroLeague MVP of the Month

- (Belize) Milt Palacio - March

Euroleague Weekly MVPs

- (Montenegro) Nikola Peković - Regular season, Week 1
- (Serbia) Novica Veličković - Regular season, Week 13

Adriatic League

MVP of the Round

- (Montenegro) Nikola Peković – Round 8
- (Montenegro) Nikola Peković – Round 13
- (Montenegro) Nikola Peković – Playoffs, Game 2
- (Montenegro) Nikola Peković – Semi-final
- (Montenegro) Nikola Peković – Final

Radivoj Korać Cup

Finals MVP

- (Serbia) Milenko Tepić

Basketball League of Serbia

Finals MVP

- (Montenegro) Nikola Peković

== Statistic ==
=== Results overview in EuroLeague ===
Win Draw Loss

Opposition	Home score	Away score	Double
(Greece) Panathinaikos	90–94, 82–73	66–67, 65–67	303–301
(Spain) TAU Cerámica	76–55	66–74, 68–85	210–214
(Spain) Real Madrid	72–80	64–75	136–155
(Turkey) Fenerbahçe	72–76	91–86	163–162
(Spain) Barcelona	81–78	69–95	150–173
(Italy) Lottomatica Roma	91–86	87–88	178–174
(France) Roanne	82–76	88–87	170–163
(Germany) Brose Baskets	85–37	62–78	147–115
(Turkey) Efes Pilsen	78–65	83–79	161–144
(Italy) Montepaschi Siena	78–75	54–71	132–146
