= Radivoj Korać Cup MVP Award =

- Sport: Basketball
- Competition: Radivoj Korać Cup
- Awarded for: the best performance in the tournament final
- Location: Niš (2003, 2008–2010, 2012, 2015–2020, 2022–2025); Novi Sad (2004, 2021); Vršac (2005); Belgrade (2006, 2011, 2014); Kragujevac (2007, 2013)
- Country: Serbia and Montenegro (2003–2006); Serbia (2006–present)
- Presented by: Basketball Federation of Serbia

History
- First award: 2003
- Editions: 21
- First winner: Reggie Freeman
- Most wins: Goran Jeretin (2)
- Most recent: Filip Petrušev (2025)

The Radivoj Korać Cup MVP Award is an annual award bestowed to the player that is deemed to be the "Most Valuable Player" during the finals of the Radivoj Korać Cup. The Radivoj Korać Cup is the top-tier level national men's professional club basketball cup in Serbia. The award has existed and been awarded since 2003.

== Winners ==
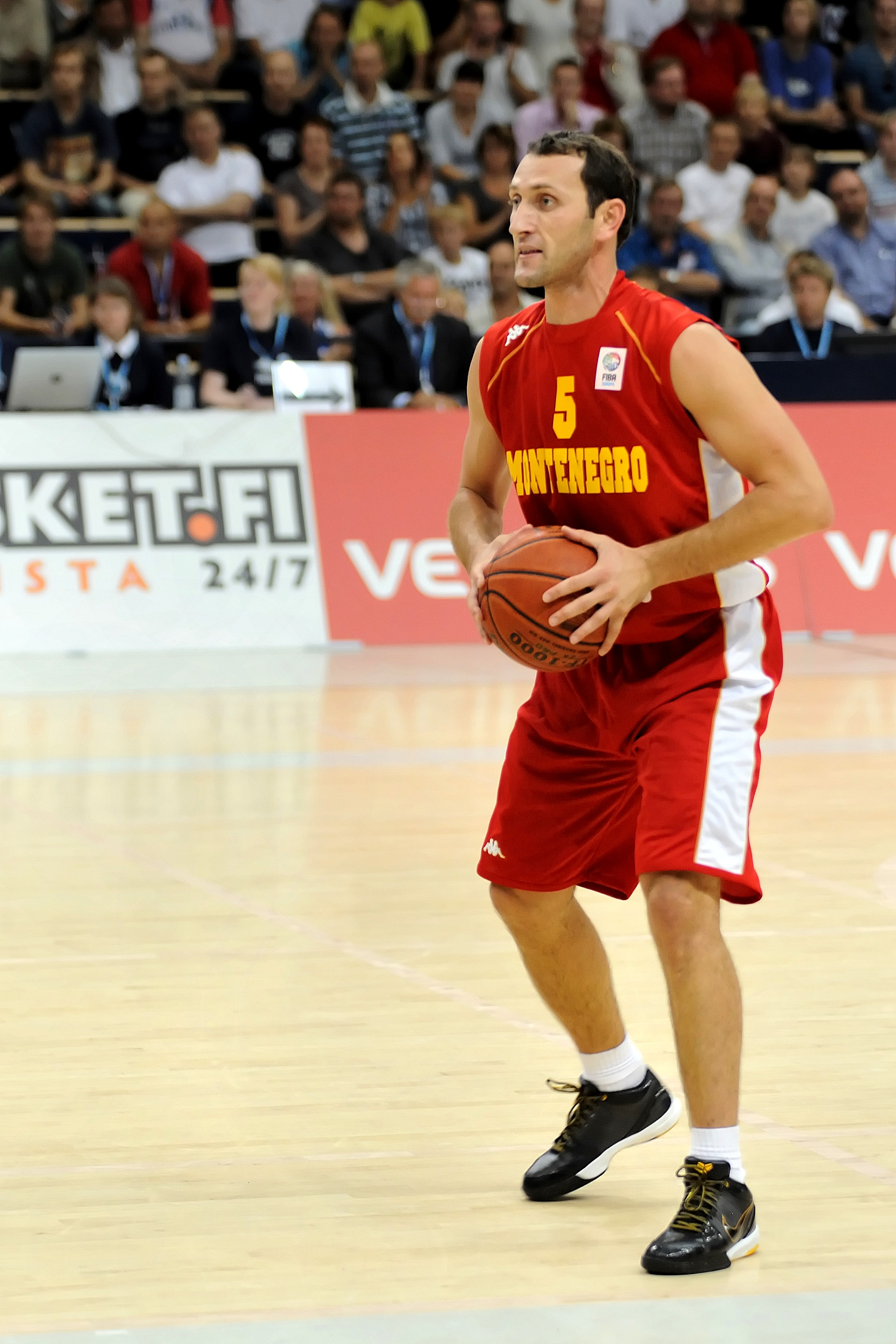
Goran Jeretin won the award two times in his career.

Season	Player	Team	Ref.
2002–03	(United States) Reggie Freeman	FMP Železnik	
2003–04	(Serbia and Montenegro) Goran Jeretin	Crvena zvezda	
2004–05	(Serbia and Montenegro) Bojan Popović	FMP Železnik (Reflex)	
2005–06	(Serbia and Montenegro) Goran Jeretin (2)	Crvena zvezda	
2006–07	(Serbia) Dragan Labović	FMP Železnik	
2007–08	(Serbia) Milenko Tepić	Partizan Igokea	
2008–09	(Serbia) Novica Veličković	Partizan Igokea	
2009–10	(Australia) Aleks Marić	Partizan	
2010–11	(United States) James Gist	Partizan	
2011–12	(Serbia) Danilo Anđušić	Partizan mt:s	
2012–13	(United States) DeMarcus Nelson	Crvena zvezda	
2013–14	(Serbia) Vasilije Micić	Mega Vizura	
2014–15	(Serbia) Luka Mitrović	Crvena zvezda Telekom	
2015–16	(Montenegro) Nikola Ivanović	Mega Leks	
2016–17	(Serbia) Marko Gudurić	Crvena zvezda mts	
2017–18	(United States) Nigel Williams-Goss	Partizan NIS	
2018–19	(Bosnia and Herzegovina) Alex Renfroe	Partizan NIS	
2019–20	(Serbia) Ognjen Jaramaz	Partizan NIS	
2020–21	(Serbia) Marko Jagodić-Kuridža	Crvena zvezda mts	
2021–22	(United States) Nate Wolters	Crvena zvezda mts	
2022–23	(Serbia) Ognjen Dobrić	Crvena zvezda Meridianbet	
2023–24	(Serbia) Miloš Teodosić	Crvena zvezda Meridianbet	
2024–25	(Serbia) Filip Petrušev	Crvena zvezda Meridianbet	

== See also ==
- List of Radivoj Korać Cup-winning head coaches
- BLS First League MVP
- BLS Super League MVP
- BLS Playoff MVP
