= KK Mega Basket =

Basketball club in Belgrade, Serbia

Mega Basket
- Leagues: Serbian League; ABA League
- Founded: 23 December 1998; 27 years ago
- History: Avala Ada (1998–2005); Mega Basket (2005–present)
- Arena: Ranko Žeravica Hall
- Capacity: 5,000
- Location: Belgrade, Serbia (1998–2012; 2019–present); Kruševac (2012–2013); Smederevo (2013–2014); Sremska Mitrovica (2014–2019)
- Team colors: Pink and white
- President: Velimir Mihailović
- General manager: Goran Ćakić
- Team manager: Aleksandar Rašić
- Head coach: Vule Avdalović
- Affiliations: ŽKK Art Basket (2017–present); OKK Beograd (2018–present)
- Championships: 1 National Cup
- Website: bcmegabasket.net
Home	Away

Košarkaški klub Mega Basket (Serbian Cyrillic: Кошаркашки клуб Мега Баскет), currently referred to as Mega Superbet for sponsorship reasons, is a men's professional basketball club based in Belgrade, Serbia. The club is a founding member and shareholder of the Adriatic Basketball Association.

In addition to Belgrade, the club also played its home games in Kruševac (2012–13 season), Smederevo (2013–14 season), and Sremska Mitrovica (2014–2019). The club participates in the Serbian League (KLS) and the ABA League.

== History ==
=== The Avala Ada era (1998–2005) ===
KK Avala Ada (Serbian Cyrillic: КК Авала Ада) was established on 23 December 1998 by a group of basketball enthusiasts, all employed at the Avala Ada packaging factory located in the Viline Vode neighbourhood on the outskirts of Belgrade. Finally implemented in late 1998, the idea of launching a full-fledged basketball club within the state-owned factory's legal framework had been considered since summer 1995, initially on the heels of yet another participation of Avala Ada employees in basketball competitions at the Workers' Sporting Games (Radničke sportske igre; state-funded excursionary social, leisure, and team building gatherings featuring semi-formal sporting competitions for employees within various industries). Even prior to 1995, Avala Ada employees had regularly participated at the Workers' Sporting Games, continually placing high against basketball select squads of other factories/companies within the packaging industry in FR Yugoslavia and also earlier in pre-1992 SFR Yugoslavia. Though the idea of launching a more formal and permanent basketball program within the factory had been bandied around since 1995, the immediate catalyst for its late 1998 formation turned out to be the factory basketball team's notable showing at the 1998 Workers' Sporting Games in Divčibare several months earlier during summer 1998. Furthermore, having already secured a steady revenue and regular customer base allowed the company to financially support such a venture outside of its core business activity. Within months, Košarkaški klub Avala Ada (Avala Ada Basketball Club) was established as a legal entity within the Avala Ada sports society that was formed simultaneously.

With KK Avala Ada's management—club president Veljko Grujić and sporting director Velimir Mihailović—appointed from the factory employee ranks, coaching hires were made from outside the factory: young head coach Miodrag "Miša" Perišić and his assistant Rade Orlović. Players on the roster were also a mix of factory's employees and outside acquisitions: the team's first captain was the factory's commercial director Bratislav Gajić.

The newly-established club started out in the lowest rank of the FR Yugoslavia basketball system: Belgrade Municipal League, the so-called "Concrete League" (Beton liga), fifth tier of competition in the country. In the early summer of 1999, the club won the Belgrade Municipal League (played outdoors only during summer), thus qualifying for the Serbian Second League (4th-tier competition on the FR Yugoslavia basketball pyramid). Playing the 1999–2000 season in the fourth-tier Serbian Second League, the Perišić-coached club set an ambitious goal of gaining promotion on its first try and succeeded.

The 2000–01 season was played in the third-tier Serbian First League, finishing third and barely missing out on promotion. Head coach Miša Perišić left the club after eventful two and a half years, taking the offer from the Serbian First League rivals KK Nova Pazova. The following 2001–02 season, Avala Ada finished third again, failing to gain promotion to the higher rank.

In the 2002–03 season, with Miša Perišić returning to the club as head coach, the club again missed promotion based on the league standing, however, it managed to qualify to the federal First B League through playoffs in Novi Bečej, beating Vrbas and KK Zeta.

Playing its first season, 2003–04, in the country-wide federal rank in the second-tier First B League (Serbian group), Avala Ada finished third thus missing promotion to the top league. Also, in 2003, Avala Ada packaging factory (founded in 1946) was privatized after 57 years of public ownership. Its new private owner Nebojša Šaranović was entirely not keen on continuing the financial support of a basketball club within his newly-acquired packaging factory asset and thus set about carving KK Avala Ada out of the factory's structure with the intention of selling it.

Before the start of the 2004–05 season, the most significant development in club's short history occurred—it was taken over by the Miško Ražnatović-owned BeoBasket sports agency.

=== The Mega Basket era (2005–present) ===
Based on their performance in the 2004–05 season, Avala Ada managed to gain promotion to the Serbia-Montenegro top-tier league. During the 2005–06 campaign, playing its first top flight season, the club changed its name to KK Mega Basket on 19 December 2005. At the same time, it signed a sponsorship deal with the Smederevo-based Ishrana food company, leading to the club competing as Mega Ishrana until 2007. The team got relegated at the end of the 2005–06 season, however, the May 2006 Montenegrin independence referendum that meant that Montenegro would become a fully independent state also resulted in the basketball league being re-organized and Mega Ishrana remaining in Serbia's top-tier basketball league.

Later, also via a naming-rights sponsorship deal, the club was called Mega Aqua Monta for the 2007–08 season, and Mega Hypo Leasing in the 2008–09 season.

In August 2009, before the start of the 2009–10 season, another Belgrade-based club KK Vizura merged into KK Mega Hypo Leasing, and the club was renamed KK Mega Vizura. In November 2014, the club changed its name to Mega Leks due to sponsorship reasons. In 2016, Mega Leks won its first trophy ever when it beat KK Partizan 86–80 in the Serbian Cup Final. In 2017, the club changed its name to Mega Bemax due to sponsorship reasons.

On June 14, 2018, the club signed a contract on sports and technical cooperation with OKK Beograd. Later that summer, on August 11, 2018, the club played a pre-season preparation game under NCAA basketball rules against the most recent NCAA tournament Southern Regional semifinalist University of Kentucky men's basketball team at the Imperial Arena on Paradise Island in the Bahamas, losing heavily 100–64. Some ten days later, on August 23, 2018, Mega played the University of Michigan men's basketball team, recent NCAA tournament runner-up, this time under FIBA rules, in Sant Julià de Vilatorta, Spain and winning 81–73.

As an organization focused primarily on showcasing its roster and providing a springboard platform for player transfers to bigger clubs in Europe and the NBA, in summer 2019, Mega continued the pre-season practice of travelling to the Bahamas to face off against top U.S. collegiate teams in preparatory games. This time, it was two games against the Texas Tech University basketball team, most recently the NCAA tournament runner-up; Texas Tech won the first contest 94–92 on August 16, 2019 at Imperial Arena on Paradise Island while Mega won 73–76 four days later at the Kendal Isaacs Gymnasium.

On September 15, 2020, the club changed its name to Mega Soccerbet for the 2020–21 season due to sponsorship reasons. On October 28, 2021, the club changed its name to Mega Mozzart for the 2021–22 season due to sponsorship reasons. In July 2022, the club changed its name to Mega MIS for the 2022–23 season due to sponsorship reasons. On 6 January 2025, the club changed its name to Mega Superbet.

== Sponsorship naming ==
The club has had several denominations through the years due to its sponsorship:

- Mega Ishrana (2005–2007)
- Mega Aqua Monta (2007–2008)
- Mega Hypo Leasing (2008–2009)
- Mega Vizura (2009–2014)
- Mega Leks (2014–2017)
- Mega Bemax (2017–2020)
- Mega Soccerbet (2020–2021)
- Mega Mozzart (2021–2022)
- Mega MIS (2022–2025)
- Mega Superbet (2025–present)

== Home arenas ==
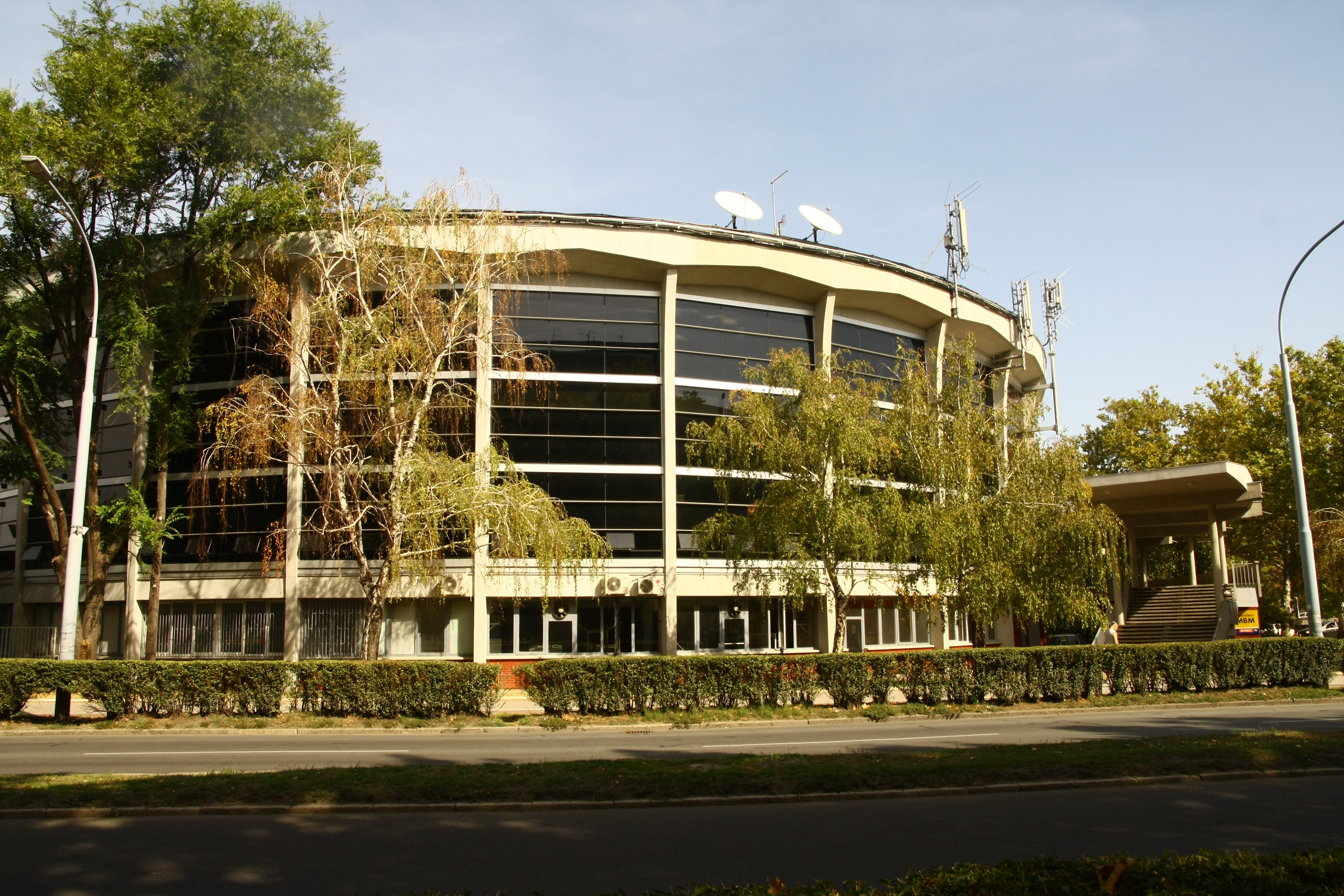
Ranko Žeravica Sports Hall

Mega Basket plays their ABA League domestic home games at the Ranko Žeravica Sports Hall, located in the Belgrade municipality of New Belgrade. The arena, then named New Belgrade Sports Hall, was built in 1968. It has a seating capacity of 5,000. Mega Basket plays their BLS home matches at the Mega Factory Hall.

The club has had several home arenas through the years in four cities:

- Šumice Hall, Belgrade (2008–2009)
- Vizura Sports Center, Belgrade (2009–2012)
- Kruševac Hall, Kruševac (2012–2013)
- Smederevo Hall, Smederevo (2013–2014)
- Pinki Hall, Sremska Mitrovica (2014–2019)
- Mega Factory Hall, Belgrade (2017–present)
- Ranko Žeravica Hall, Belgrade (2014–2015, 2019–present)

== Players ==
=== Current roster ===
Note: Flags indicate national team eligibility at FIBA-sanctioned events. Players may hold other non-FIBA nationalities not displayed.

Mega Superbet roster
Players
Coaches

Pos.	No.	Nat.	Name	Ht.	Age
F	3	(Serbia)	Šuput, Milan	1.98 m (6 ft 6 in)	22 – 8 June 2004
F/C	5	(Serbia)	Bošković, Mihailo	2.05 m (6 ft 9 in)	24 – 30 June 2002
PG	7	(Serbia)	Mušicki, Andrej	1.89 m (6 ft 2 in)	21 – 14 February 2005
G/F	8	(Serbia)	Vojinović, Aleksandar	1.96 m (6 ft 5 in)	20 – 10 August 2006
G/F	10	(Switzerland)	Maniema, Lucas	1.93 m (6 ft 4 in)	20 – 6 March 2006
F	11	(Bosnia and Herzegovina)	Hrelja, Tarik	1.94 m (6 ft 4 in)	20 – 9 May 2006
F	13	(Serbia)	Kontić, Vladimir	1.96 m (6 ft 5 in)	20 – 6 January 2006
C	15	(Serbia)	Bačko, Pavle	2.11 m (6 ft 11 in)	19 – 11 July 2007
PF	17	(Serbia)	Nikolić, Ognjen	2.08 m (6 ft 10 in)	20 – 24 May 2006
G/F	23	(Serbia)	Srzentić, Ognjen	2.02 m (6 ft 8 in)	20 – 24 May 2006
C	28	(Serbia)	Paunov, Luka	2.10 m (6 ft 11 in)	23 – 28 August 2003
PG	77	(Serbia)	Lučić, Andrei	1.88 m (6 ft 2 in)	19 – 6 January 2007
G/F	88	(Serbia)	Šuput, Uroš	1.93 m (6 ft 4 in)	20 – 20 July 2006

Head coach

- (Serbia) Vule Avdalović

Assistant coach(es)

- (Serbia) Branislav Božović
- (Serbia) Milan Mitrović

Team manager

- (Serbia) Aleksandar Rašić

Legend

- (C) Team captain
- (IN) Inactive
- (L) On loan
- (TW) Two-way affiliate player
- Injured

- Roster
- Transactions
Updated: August 18, 2026

=== Depth chart ===
Pos.	Starting 5	Bench 1	Bench 2
C	Pavle Bačko	Luka Paunov	Tarik Hrelja
PF	Mihailo Bošković	Vladimir Kontić	Ognjen Nikolić
SF	Ognjen Srzentić	Milan Šuput
SG	Lucas Maniema	Uroš Šuput	Aleksandar Vojinović
PG	Andrei Lučić	Andrej Mušicki

=== Players at the NBA draft ===
*	Denotes player who has been selected for at least one All-Star Game and All-NBA Team
^{#}	Denotes player who has never appeared in an NBA regular-season or playoff game

Year	Rnd.	Pick	Player	Pos.	Drafted by
2007	2	60	(Serbia) Milovan Raković^{#}	C	Dallas Mavericks (traded to Chicago Bulls)
2014	2	41	(Serbia) Nikola Jokić^{*}	C	Denver Nuggets
2014	2	52	(Serbia) Vasilije Micić	PG	Philadelphia 76ers (traded to Oklahoma City Thunder)
2014	2	54	(Serbia) Nemanja Dangubić^{#}	SF	Philadelphia 76ers (traded to Brooklyn Nets)
2016	1	24	(France) Timothé Luwawu-Cabarrot	G/F	Philadelphia 76ers
2016	2	32	(Croatia) Ivica Zubac	C	Los Angeles Lakers
2016	2	35	(Serbia) Rade Zagorac^{#}	SF	Boston Celtics (traded to Memphis Grizzlies)
2017	2	49	(Slovenia) Vlatko Čančar	SF	Denver Nuggets
2017	2	58	(Serbia) Ognjen Jaramaz^{#}	PG	New York Knicks
2017	2	60	(Guinea) Alpha Kaba^{#}	PF/C	Atlanta Hawks
2019	1	18	(Georgia (country)) Goga Bitadze	C	Indiana Pacers
2020	2	44	(Montenegro) Marko Simonović	C	Chicago Bulls
2021	2	50	(Serbia) Filip Petrušev	PF/C	Philadelphia 76ers
2022	1	27	(Serbia) Nikola Jović	SF	Miami Heat
2022	2	52	(Croatia) Karlo Matković	C	New Orleans Pelicans (from Utah Jazz)
2024	2	43	(Serbia) Nikola Đurišić^{#}	SG/SF	Miami Heat (traded to Atlanta Hawks)
2025	2	47	(Serbia) Bogoljub Marković	PF	Milwaukee Bucks

== Coaches ==
Avala Ada

- (Serbia and Montenegro) Miodrag Perišić (1999–2001)
- (Serbia and Montenegro) Miodrag Perišić (2002–2004)
- (Serbia and Montenegro) Boško Đokić (2005)
- (Serbia and Montenegro) Miodrag Kadija (2005)
- (Serbia and Montenegro) Oliver Popović (2005)

Mega Basket

- (Serbia and Montenegro) Vlade Đurović (2005–2006)
- (Serbia) Oliver Popović (2006–2007)
- (Serbia) Mihailo Uvalin (2007)
- (Serbia) Dragiša Šarić (2007)
- (Serbia) Aleksandar Kesar (2007–2008)
- (Serbia) Mihailo Uvalin (2008–2009)
- (Serbia) Miodrag Rajković (2009–2010)
- (Serbia) Vlada Vukoičić (2010–2012)
- (Serbia) Dejan Milojević (2012–2020)
- (Serbia) Vlada Jovanović (2020–2022)
- (Serbia) Marko Barać (2022–present)

== Season-by-season ==
Season	Tier	Division	Pos.	Postseason	W–L	National Cup	Regional competitions			European competitions		
2005–06	1	BLSM First League	10	—	9–13	—	—			—		
2006–07	1	BLS First League	3	SL 6th	16–20	Quarterfinalist	—			—		
2007–08	1	BLS First League	5	—	12–10	—	—			—		
2008–09	1	BLS First League	5	—	15–11	—	Balkan League	3rd	6–6	—		
2009–10	1	BLS First League	8	—	13–13	—	—			—		
2010–11	1	BLS First League	4	SL 8th	18–22	Quarterfinalist	—			—		
2011–12	1	BLS First League	4	SL 6th	22–18	Quarterfinalist	—			—		
2012–13	1	BLS First League	2	Semifinalist	30–13	Semifinalist	—			—		
2013–14	1	BLS Super League	3	Semifinalist	9–7	Runners-up	ABA League	8	12–14	—		
2014–15	1	BLS Super League	4	Semifinalist	7–9	Runners-up	ABA League	10	11–15	—		
2015–16	1	BLS Super League	B2	Semifinalist	4–4	Winners	ABA League	2nd	19–12	—		
2016–17	1	BLS Super League	4	Semifinalist	9–7	Semifinalist	ABA League	6	11–15	Champions League	7th	4–10
2017–18	1	BLS Super League	A3	Quarterfinals	8–6	Semifinalist	ABA 1st League	9	8–14	—		
2018–19	1	BLS Super League	B2	Semifinalist	7–5	Semifinalist	ABA 1st League	5	10–12	—		
2019–20	1	BLS Super League	Abandoned			Semifinalist	ABA 1st League	Abd	6–15	—		
2020–21	1	BLS Super League	NH	Runners-up	5–3	Runners-up	ABA 1st League	6	14–12	—		
2021–22	1	BLS Super League	NH	Semifinalist	7–2	Semifinalist	ABA 1st League	10	10–16	—		
2022–23	1	BLS Super League	NH	Third place	5–3	Runners-up	ABA 1st League	6	12–14	—		
2023–24	1	BLS Super League	NH	Semifinalist	1–2	Quarterfinalist	ABA 1st League	4	16–10	—		
2024–25	1	BLS Super League	NH	Quarterfinals	5–6	Semifinalist	ABA 1st League	8	16–14	—		

== Trophies and awards ==
=== Trophies ===
- Serbian League
  - Runners-up (1): 2020–21
- Serbian Cup

- Winners (1): 2016
- Runners-up (4): 2014, 2015, 2021, 2023

- Adriatic League
  - Runners-up (1): 2015–16
- Balkan League
  - 3rd place (1): 2008–09

=== Individual awards ===
- Serbian First League MVP (1):
  - (Serbia) Boban Marjanović – 2013
- Serbian Super League MVP (1):
  - (Serbia) Boban Marjanović – 2013
- Serbian Cup MVP (2):
  - (Serbia) Vasilije Micić – 2014
  - (Montenegro) Nikola Ivanović – 2016
- Adriatic League MVP (2):
  - (Serbia) Nikola Jokić – 2015
  - (Serbia) Filip Petrušev – 2021
- Adriatic League Top Scorer (1):
  - (Serbia) Filip Petrušev – 2021
- Adriatic League Top Prospect (2):
  - (Serbia) Filip Petrušev – 2021
  - (Serbia) Nikola Jović – 2022

== Management and staff ==
Current officeholders are:

- President: Vladimir Mihailović
- General manager: Goran Ćakić
- Team manager: Novica Veličković

Current head coaches are:

- Senior team: Marko Barać
- U18 and U19 teams: Milan Vidosavljević
- U16 team: Dejan Pejić

== Notable players ==
Note: Flags indicate national team eligibility at FIBA-sanctioned events. Players may hold other non-FIBA nationalities not displayed.

Criteria

To appear in this section a player must have either:

- Set a club record or won an individual award while at the club
- Played at least one official international match for their national team at any time
- Played at least one official NBA match at any time.

- (Serbia) Danilo Anđušić
- (Serbia) Nemanja Dangubić
- (Serbia) Tadija Dragićević
- (Serbia) Stevan Jelovac
- (Serbia) Nikola Jokić
- (Serbia) Nikola Jović
- (Serbia) Marko Kešelj
- (Serbia) Nemanja Krstić
- (Serbia) Sava Lešić
- (Serbia) Boban Marjanović
- (Serbia) Vasilije Micić
- (Serbia) Dragan Milosavljević
- (Serbia) Dejan Musli
- (Serbia) Ivan Paunić
- (Serbia) Filip Petrušev
- (Serbia) Aleksandar Rašić
- (Serbia) Boriša Simanić
- (Serbia) Jovo Stanojević
- (Serbia) Stefan Stojačić
- (Serbia) Milenko Tepić
- (Serbia) Novica Veličković
- (Serbia) Rade Zagorac
- (Bosnia and Herzegovina) Stefan Glogovac
- (Bosnia and Herzegovina) Aleksandar Lazić
- (Bosnia and Herzegovina) Ratko Varda
- (Croatia) Danko Branković
- (Croatia) Karlo Matković
- (Croatia) Ivica Zubac
- (France) Malcolm Cazalon
- (France) Timothé Luwawu-Cabarrot
- (France) Adam Mokoka
- (Georgia (country)) Goga Bitadze
- (Germany) Kostja Mushidi
- (Greece) Vlado Janković
- (Guinea) Alpha Kaba
- (Jamaica) Dylan Ennis
- (Montenegro) Nikola Ivanović
- (Montenegro) Danilo Nikolić
- (Montenegro) Nikola Peković
- (Montenegro) Kendrick Perry
- (Montenegro) Petar Popović
- (Montenegro) Nemanja Radović
- (Montenegro) Marko Simonović
- (New Zealand) Corey Webster
- (Poland) Aleksander Balcerowski
- (Russia) Samson Ruzhentsev
- (Slovenia) Vlatko Čančar
- (Turkey) Duşan Çantekin
- (United States) Scoochie Smith

== International record ==
Season	Achievement	Notes
Basketball Champions League
2016–17	Regular season	7th in Group D with SIG Strasbourg, Sidigas Avellino, Iberostar Tenerife, Telenet Oostende, Cibona, Juventus, and Mornar (4–10)
