= 2002–03 Radivoj Korać Cup =

2003 Radivoj Korać Cup
- Season: 2002–03
- Duration: 24–27 April 2003
- Games played: 7
- Teams: 8

Regular season
- Season MVP: (United States) Reggie Freeman

Finals
- Champions: FMP Železnik (2nd title)
- Runners-up: Hemofarm

The 2003 Radivoj Korać Cup was the inaugural season of the Radivoj Korać Cup, a competition formerly known as the Yugoslav Cup.

== Venue ==
Niš	2002–03 Radivoj Korać Cup (Serbia and Montenegro)
Čair Sports Center	2002–03 Radivoj Korać Cup (Serbia and Montenegro)
Capacity: 5,000 expanded	2002–03 Radivoj Korać Cup (Serbia and Montenegro)

== Qualified teams ==
YUBA League	Local Cups
Budućnost; Crvena zvezda FMP Železnik; Lovćen; Hemofarm; Partizan Mobtel	Ergonom (Cup of Serbia Winner); Rudar Sjever (Cup of Montenegro Winner)

== Bracket ==
Quarterfinals
24 April
Crvena zvezda	105
Rudar Sjever	60
25 April
FMP Železnik	95
Lovćen	60
25 April
Partizan Mobtel	96
Ergonom	74
24 April
Budućnost	94
Hemofarm	102

Semifinals
26 April
Crvena zvezda	77
FMP Železnik	79
26 April
Partizan Mobtel	88
Hemofarm	99

Final
27 April
FMP Železnik	88
Hemofarm	67

== Quarterfinals ==
24 April 2003

Budućnost	94–102	Hemofarm

Čair Sports Center, Niš

24 April 2003

Crvena zvezda	105–60	Rudar Sjever

Čair Sports Center, Niš

25 April 2003

FMP Železnik	95–69	Lovćen

Čair Sports Center, Niš

25 April 2003

Partizan Mobtel	96–74	Ergonom

Čair Sports Center, Niš

== Semifinals ==
26 April 2003
18:00

Crvena zvezda	77–79	FMP Železnik

Čair Sports Center, Niš

26 April 2003
20:00

Partizan Mobtel	88–99	Hemofarm

Čair Sports Center, Niš

== Final ==
27 April 2003
21:00

Report

FMP Železnik	88–67	Hemofarm
Scoring by quarter: 27–19, 24–18, 17–16, 20–13
Pts: Zoroski, Aškrabić 20		Pts: Miličić 15

Čair Sports Center, Niš
Attendance: 5,000
Referees: Milivoje Jovičić i Ilija Belošević
