= 2003–04 Radivoj Korać Cup =

2004 Radivoj Korać Cup
- Season: 2003–04
- Duration: 24–28 December 2003
- Games played: 8
- Teams: 9

Regular season
- Season MVP: (Serbia and Montenegro) Goran Jeretin

Finals
- Champions: Crvena zvezda
- Runners-up: Reflex

The 2004 Radivoj Korać Cup was the second season of the Serbian-Montenegrin men's national basketball cup tournament. The Žućko's left trophy awarded to the winner Crvena zvezda from Belgrade.

== Venue ==
| Novi Sad | 2003–04 Radivoj Korać Cup (Serbia and Montenegro) |
| SPC Vojvodina | 2003–04 Radivoj Korać Cup (Serbia and Montenegro) |
| Capacity: 6,987 | 2003–04 Radivoj Korać Cup (Serbia and Montenegro) |

== Qualified teams ==
| ABA Goodyear League | YUBA League | Local Cups |
|---|---|---|
| Budućnost; Crvena zvezda Lovćen; Reflex | Hemofarm; NIS Vojvodina; Partizan Mobtel | Lavovi 063 (Cup of Serbia Winner); Mornar (Cup of Montenegro Winner) |

== Bracket ==
Quarterfinals
25 December
Hemofarm | 76
Reflex | 86
25 December
Lavovi 063^{QUAL} | 71
Budućnost | 87
26 December
NIS Vojvodina | 87
Lovćen | 72
26 December
Partizan Mobtel | 99
Crvena zvezda (OT) | 105

Semifinals
27 December
Reflex | 82
Budućnost | 70
27 December
NIS Vojvodina | 101
Crvena zvezda (OT) | 108

Final
28 December
Reflex | 89
Crvena zvezda (OT) | 91

Source: Serbia Government

== Qualifications ==
24 December 2003
20:15

Report

| Lavovi 063 | 88–78 | Mornar |
Scoring by quarter: 20–23, 18–16, 16–22, 33–17
| Pts: Stefanović 20 | | Pts: Mičeta 24 |

SPC Vojvodina, Novi Sad

== Quarterfinals ==
25 December 2003
18:00

Report

| Hemofarm | 76–86 | Reflex |
Scoring by quarter: 24–17, 23–22, 16–28, 19–19
| Pts: Bogavac 25 | | Pts: Plisnić 25; Rebs: Plisnić 9 |

SPC Vojvodina, Novi Sad
Attendance: 600
Referees: Ljuca, Goran Vojinović

25 December 2003
20:15

Report

| Lavovi 063 | 71–87 | Budućnost |
Scoring by quarter: 16–27, 19–22, 13–16, 23–22
| Pts: Marjanović 23 | | Pts: Staley 31 |

SPC Vojvodina, Novi Sad
Attendance: 200
Referees: Bubalo, Jeličić

26 December 2003
18:00

Report

| NIS Vojvodina | 87–72 | Lovćen |
Scoring by quarter: 20–16, 28–12, 21–21, 18–23
| Pts: Gurović 26 | | Pts: Rakočević 13 |

SPC Vojvodina, Novi Sad

26 December 2003
20:15

Report

| Partizan Mobtel | 99–105 (OT) | Crvena zvezda |
Scoring by quarter: 25–17, 19–24, 29–23, 17–26, Overtime: 9–15
| Pts: House 41 | | Pts: Rakočević 26 |

SPC Vojvodina, Novi Sad
Attendance: 4,000
Referees: Ilija Belošević, Dimitrijević

== Semifinals ==
27 December 2003
18:00

Report

| Reflex | 82–70 | Budućnost |
Scoring by quarter: 18–20, 17–16, 31–11, 16–23
| Pts: Ffriend 18 | | Pts: Milojević 20 |

SPC Vojvodina, Novi Sad
Attendance: 2,000
Referees: Janošević, Goran Vojinović

27 December 2003
20:15

Report

| NIS Vojvodina | 101–108 (OT) | Crvena zvezda |
Scoring by quarter: 21–21, 17–24, 29–15, 21–28, Overtime: 13–20
| Pts: Ćeranić 20 | | Pts: Đurić 17 |

SPC Vojvodina, Novi Sad
Attendance: 2,500
Referees: Jokić, Nešković

== Final ==
28 December 2003
17:30

Report

| Reflex | 89–91 | Crvena zvezda |
Scoring by quarter: 17–15, 21–14, 21–21, 16–25
| Pts: Aškrabić 26 | | Pts: Jeretin 27 |

SPC Vojvodina, Novi Sad
Attendance: 2,500
Referees: Ilija Belošević, Goran Vojinović
