= 2004–05 Radivoj Korać Cup =

2005 Radivoj Korać Cup
- Season: 2004–05
- Duration: 16–20 February 2005
- Games played: 8
- Teams: 9

Regular season
- Season MVP: (Serbia and Montenegro) Bojan Popović

Finals
- Champions: Reflex
- Runners-up: Partizan Pivara MB

The 2005 Radivoj Korać Cup was the third season of the Serbian-Montenegrin men's national basketball cup tournament. The Žućko's left trophy awarded to the winner Reflex from Belgrade.

== Venue ==
Vršac	2004–05 Radivoj Korać Cup (Serbia and Montenegro)
Millennium Center	2004–05 Radivoj Korać Cup (Serbia and Montenegro)
Capacity: 6,987	2004–05 Radivoj Korać Cup (Serbia and Montenegro)

== Qualified teams ==
ABA Goodyear League	YUBA League	Local Cups
Budućnost; Crvena zvezda Hemofarm; Partizan Pivara MB; Reflex	NIS Vojvodina; Atlas	Ergonom (Cup of Serbia Runners-up); Mornar (Cup of Montenegro Winner)

== Bracket ==
Quarterfinals
17 February
Reflex	78
NIS Vojvodina	77
17 February
Hemofarm	79
Budućnost	85
18 February
Partizan Pivara MB	105
Ergonom^{QUAL}	97
18 February
Crvena zvezda	86
Atlas	89

Semifinals
19 February
Reflex	85
Budućnost	76
19 February
Partizan Pivara MB	87
Atlas	80

Final
20 February
Reflex	88
Partizan	84

== Qualifications ==
16 February 2005
17:00

Report

Ergonom	101–87	Mornar
Scoring by quarter: 23–17, 27–26, 25–21, 26–23
Pts: Ljubojević 24; Rebs: Ljubojević 9 Asts: Bogdanović 5		Pts: Jelenić 21

Millennium Center, Vršac
Referees: Šutulović, Bogunović, Oberknežević

== Quarterfinals ==
17 February 2005
17:30

Report

Reflex	78–77	NIS Vojvodina
Scoring by quarter: 23–30, 16–13, 18–17, 21–17
Pts: Rašić 21; Rebs: Jorović 6		Pts: Stewart 26; Rebs: Stewart 9

Millennium Center, Vršac
Referees: Ilija Belošević, Jovčić i Nešković

17 February 2005
20:00

Report

Hemofarm	79–85	Budućnost
Scoring by quarter: 17–23, 17–17, 23–14, 22–31
Pts: Topić, Hukić 17		Pts: Marjanović 19; Rebs: Marjanović 7

Millennium Center, Vršac
Referees: Šutulović, Vojinović i Rutešić

18 February 2005
18:00

Report

Partizan Pivara MB	105–97	Ergonom
Scoring by quarter: 24–30, 32–21, 31–15, 18–31
Pts: Bogdanović 19; Rebs: three players 6 Asts: Milojević 6		Pts: Bogdanović 22; Rebs: Kljajević 5 Asts: Bogdanović 6

Millennium Center, Vršac
Referees: Jovčić, Vojinović i Rutešić

18 February 2005
20:45

Report 1 Report 2

Crvena zvezda	86–89	Atlas
Scoring by quarter: 24–17, 19–27, 21–20, 22–25
Pts: Jeretin 22		Pts: Mišković 26

Millennium Center, Vršac
Referees: Ilija Belošević, Šutulović i Sedlar

== Semifinals ==
19 February 2005
18:00

Report

Reflex	85–76	Budućnost
Scoring by quarter: 16–21, 26–20, 21–15, 22–20
Pts: Majstorović 21		Pts: Minić 20

Millennium Center, Vršac

19 February 2005
20:45

Report

Partizan Pivara MB	87–80	Atlas
Scoring by quarter: 19–19, 28–21, 17–20, 23–20
Pts: Milojević 27; Rebs: Milojević 11		Pts: Holland 27

Millennium Center, Vršac

== Final ==
20 February 2005
19:00

Report

Reflex	88–84	Partizan Pivara MB
Scoring by quarter: 21–23, 15–19, 28–19, 24–23
Pts: Popović 25		Pts: Milojević 34; Rebs: Milojević 9

Millennium Center, Vršac
Attendance: 3,700
Referees: Milivoje Jovčić, Šutulović, Vojinović
