= Vujadin Subotić =

Montenegrin basketball player

Personal information
- Born: 18 December 1981 (age 44) Kotor, Montenegro, Yugoslavia
- Listed height: 6 ft 6 in (1.98 m)
- Listed weight: 202 lb (92 kg)

Career information
- NBA draft: 2003: undrafted
- Playing career: 1999–2016
- Position: Small forward
- Number: 6, 9, 13, 30

Career history
- 1999–2000: Budućnost
- 2000–2001: Zagorje
- 2001–2002: Union Olimpija
- 2003–2004: OKK Beograd
- 2004–2006: Crvena zvezda
- 2006–2007: Löwen Braunschweig
- 2007–2008: Alba Berlin
- 2008: Crvena zvezda
- 2008–2009: AEL Limassol
- 2009–2010: Keravnos
- 2010: OKK Beograd
- 2010–2011: Crvena zvezda
- 2011–2013: AEK Larnaca
- 2013–2015: CSM Oradea
- 2015: SCM Timișoara
- 2016: Inter Bratislava

Vujadin Subotić (born 18 December 1981) is a retired Montenegrin professional basketball player.

== Professional career ==
During his playing days, he played for Budućnost, Slovenian teams Zagorje and Union Olimpija, Serbian teams OKK Beograd and Crvena zvezda, German teams Löwen Braunschweig and Alba Berlin, Cypriot teams AEL Limassol, Keravnos, and AEK Larnaca, Romanian teams CSM Oradea and SCM Timișoara, and a Slovak team Inter Bratislava. He retired as a player with Inter Bratislava in 2016.

== Career achievements ==
- Adriatic League champion: 1 (with Union Olimpija: 2001–02)
- Premier Slovenian League champion: 1 (with Union Olimpija: 2001–02)
- Cyprus Division A champion: 1 (with AEK Larnaca: 2012–13)
- Serbian Cup winner: 1 (with Crvena zvezda: 2005–06)
- Slovenian Cup winner: 1 (with Union Olimpija: 2001–02)
- Cypriot Cup winner: 1 (with Keravnos: 2009–10)
- Slovak Cup winner: 1 (with Inter Bratislava: 2015–16)

== See also ==
- List of KK Crvena zvezda players with 100 games played
