= Milenko Tepić =

Serbian basketball player

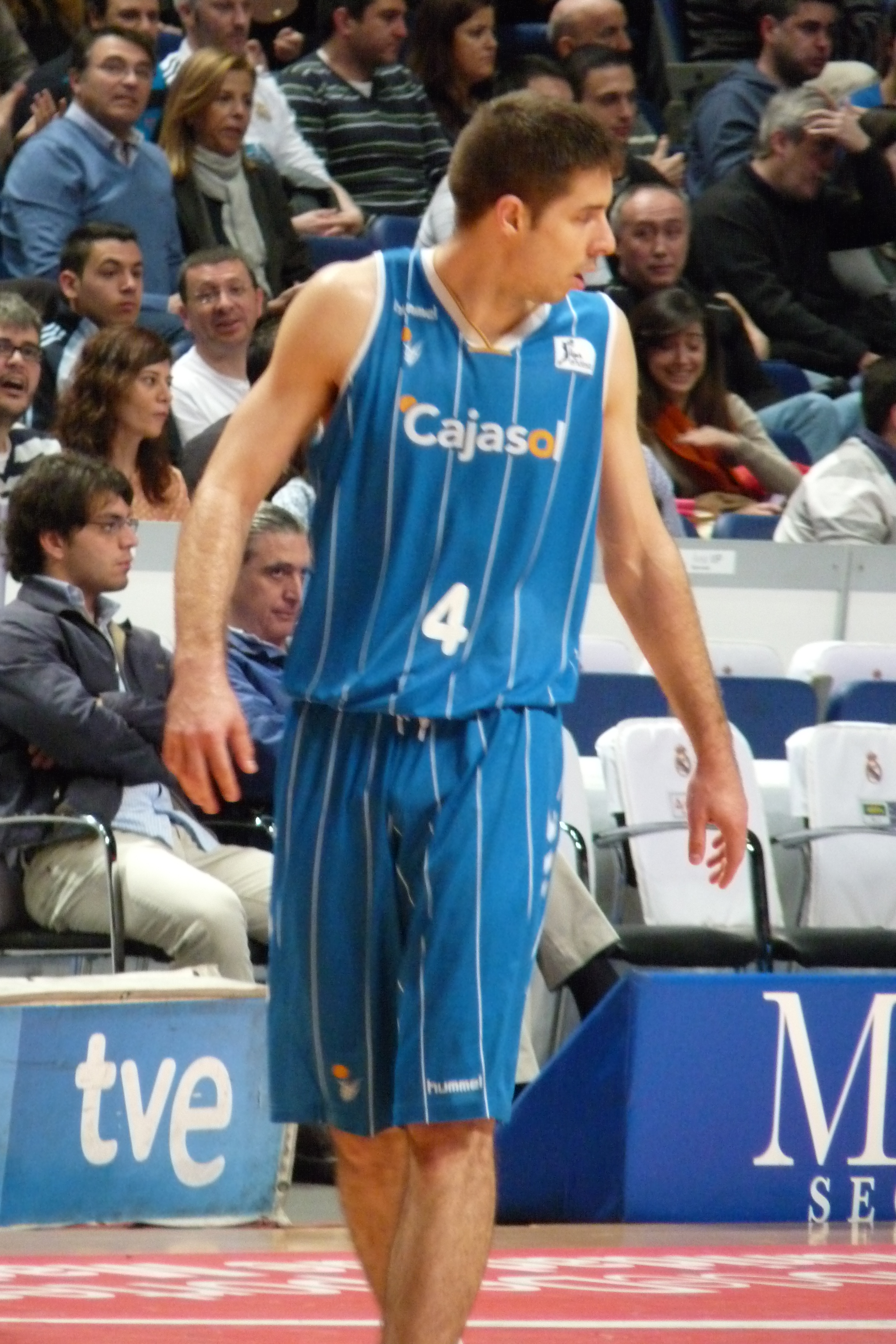
- Tepić with Cajasol in March 2013

Partizan Belgrade
- Title: Youth system director

Personal information
- Born: February 27, 1987 (age 39) Novi Sad, SR Serbia, SFR Yugoslavia
- Listed height: 6 ft 8 in (2.03 m)
- Listed weight: 225 lb (102 kg)

Career information
- NBA draft: 2009: undrafted
- Playing career: 2002–2021
- Position: Shooting guard / small forward
- Number: 4, 5, 8

Career history
- 2002–2006: NIS Vojvodina
- 2006–2009: Partizan
- 2009–2011: Panathinaikos
- 2011–2013: Sevilla
- 2013: Lietuvos rytas
- 2013–2015: Partizan
- 2015–2016: PAOK
- 2016–2017: Orlandina
- 2017–2018: Brindisi
- 2018–2019: PAOK
- 2019: Pallacanestro Varese
- 2019–2020: Iraklis
- 2020–2021: Mega

Career highlights
- EuroLeague champion (2011); 2× Greek League champion (2010, 2011); 3× ABA League champion (2007–2009); 4× Serbian League champion (2007–2009, 2014); 2× Serbian Cup winner (2008, 2009); Serbian Cup MVP (2008)
Medals
Men's basketball
Representing Serbia
EuroBasket
Silver medal – second place	2009 Poland	Team
U20 European Championship
Gold medal – first place	2007 Slovenia	Team
Representing Serbia and Montenegro
U20 European Championship
Gold medal – first place	2006 Turkey	Team
Universiade
Bronze medal – third place	2005 İzmir	Competition
U18 European Championship
Gold medal – first place	2005 Serbia and Montenegro	Team
European Championship for Cadets
Gold medal – first place	2003 Spain	Team

Milenko Tepić (Serbian: Миленко Тепић; born February 27, 1987) is a Serbian professional basketball executive and former player who is currently the youth system director for Partizan. He is 2.02 m (6 ft 7.5 in) tall, and a combo guard-point forward.

== Professional career ==
Tepić began his career playing with the KK Sports World youth teams in Serbia. He made his professional debut with the NIS Vojvodina in 2002.

In July 2006, Tepić signed with the Serbian Euroleague club Partizan. Tepić has won three Serbian League and Adriatic League titles with Partizan. He also lifted the Serbian Cup trophy in 2008 and 2009. In his last season with Partizan he averaged 9.8 points, 3.5 rebounds and 3.4 assists in 18 Euroleague games, helping his team reach the Quarterfinal Playoffs for the second time in a row.

In June 2009, Tepić signed a three-year contract with the Greek Basket League club Panathinaikos. He played two seasons with the Greek club and won the EuroLeague in 2011, as well as two Greek League championships in 2010 and 2011.

On 26 September 2011, he signed a two-year contract with the Spanish club Cajasol Sevilla. On 25 July 2013 he signed a one-year deal with Lietuvos rytas.

In December 2013, he returned to his former club Partizan, signing a contract until the end of the 2014–15 season. He won the Serbian League championship in 2014.

On 3 September 2015 Tepić signed with Greek club PAOK for the 2015–16 season.

On 13 November 2016 he signed with Italian club Orlandina Basket for the rest of the 2016–17 LBA season.

On 22 July 2017 Tepić signed with Italian club New Basket Brindisi for the 2017–18 LBA season.

On 21 July 2019 he signed with Pallacanestro Varese of the Italian LBA but the contract was terminated on November.

On 14 November 2019 Tepić joined his third team in the Greek League, Iraklis Thessaloniki. He averaged 4.7 points, 4.7 rebounds and 1.9 assists per game. On 10 August 2020 he signed with Mega Basket. On 15 July 2021, he announced his retirement from his basketball career at age 34, becoming the team manager for Mega Basket.

== National team career ==
Tepić won a gold medal at both the 2003 FIBA Europe Under-16 Championship and the 2005 FIBA Europe Under-18 Championship. He also won a gold medal at both the 2006 and 2007 FIBA Europe Under-20 Championships.

He has also been a member of the senior men's Serbian national basketball team, and with the senior team of Serbia, he played at the EuroBasket 2007. At the EuroBasket 2009, he won a silver medal with Serbia. He also played at the 2010 FIBA World Championship and the EuroBasket 2011.

== Career statistics ==
Legend
GP	Games played	GS	Games started	MPG	Minutes per game
FG%	Field-goal percentage	3P%	3-point field-goal percentage	FT%	Free-throw percentage
RPG	Rebounds per game	APG	Assists per game	SPG	Steals per game
BPG	Blocks per game	PPG	Points per game	PIR	Performance index rating
**Bold**	Career high

=== Euroleague ===
†	Denotes seasons in which Tepić won the EuroLeague

Year	Team	GP	GS	MPG	FG%	3P%	FT%	RPG	APG	SPG	BPG	PPG	PIR
2006–07	Partizan	20	6	19.7	.337	.281	.698	2.1	1.4	**1.3**	—	4.8	4.3
2007–08	Partizan	**23**	14	26.5	**.439**	.389	.783	3.4	2.2	.8	.1	9.0	8.1
2008–09	Partizan	19	**18**	**30.5**	.389	**.397**	.673	**3.5**	**3.3**	.8	**.2**	**9.7**	**10.5**
2009–10	Panathinaikos	15	2	15.8	.364	.217	.778	2.1	1.0	.4	—	3.5	2.3
2010–11†	Panathinaikos	19	2	9.6	.321	.143	.706	1.1	.7	.3	—	2.5	1.7
2013–14	Rytas	9	1	15.8	.348	.222	**1.000**	1.6	1.4	.5	—	4.2	3.2
2013–14	Partizan	13	10	29.6	.427	.320	.889	2.5	2.0	.8	—	6.2	5.0
Career		118	53	20.5	.388	.331	.731	2.4	1.7	.7	.1	6.0	5.4

== Post-playing career ==
On 15 July 2021, on the same day of the retirement of his playing career, Mega Basket named Tepić their new team manager. He left after only one season, in July 2022.

Sporting positions
New creation	Team manager of KK Mega Basket; 2021–2022	Succeeded by Novica Veličković
