= Marko Jovanović (basketball) =

Serbian basketball player

Personal information
- Born: 6 January 1982 (age 44) Niš, SR Serbia, SFR Yugoslavia
- Listed height: 2.13 m (7 ft 0 in)
- Listed weight: 100 kg (220 lb)

Career information
- NBA draft: 2004: undrafted
- Playing career: 1999–2011
- Position: Center
- Number: 12, 21

Career history
- 1999–2000: Ergonom
- 2000–2001: Partizan
- 2001–2002: Zdravlje
- 2002–2003: Sloga
- 2003–2004: RheinEnergie Köln
- 2004–2005: Löwen Braunschweig
- 2006: BG Karlsruhe
- 2006–2007: Panellinios
- 2007–2008: Slovan
- 2008–2009: Vojvodina Srbijagas
- 2009–2010: Konstantin
- 2010: Odesa
- 2011: Konstantin

Marko Jovanović (Serbian Cyrillic: Марко Јовановић; born 6 January 1982) is a Serbian former professional basketball player. Standing at 7 ft 0 in (2.13 m) and weighing 220 pounds (100 kg), he played center position.

== Playing career ==
A center, Jovanović spent his professional career with Ergonom, Partizan, Zdravlje, Sloga, RheinEnergie Köln, Löwen Braunschweig, BG Karlsruhe, Panellinios, Slovan, Vojvodina Srbijagas, Konstantin, and Odesa. In July 2006, Jovanović joined the Detroit Pistons for the NBA Summer League. He retired as a professional player with Konstantin in 2011.

== National team career ==
In July 2000, Jovanović was a member of the Yugoslavia U-18 (representing FR Yugoslavia) that finished 5th at the European Championship for Juniors in Zadar, Croatia. Over eight tournament games, he averaged 10.4 points, 3.8 rebounds, and 0.4 assists per game. In July/August 2002, Jovanović was a member of the Yugoslavia U-20 that finished 7th at the European Championship for Young Men in Lithuania. Over eight tournament games, he averaged 5.5 points, 3.1 rebounds, and 0.5 assists per game.

== Career achievements ==
- German Cup winner: 1 (with RheinEnergie Köln: 2003–04)

== See also ==
- List of Serbian NBA Summer League players
