= 2015–16 Radivoj Korać Cup =

Radivoj Korać Cup 2016
- League: Radivoj Korać Cup
- Sport: Basketball
- Duration: 18–21 February 2016
- Finals champions: Mega Leks; 1st title
- Runners-up: Partizan
- Finals MVP: (Montenegro) Nikola Ivanović

Radivoj Korać Cup seasons
- ← 2014–15 2016–17 →

The 2016 Radivoj Korać Cup season was the 10th season of the Serbian national basketball cup tournament.

The competition started on February 18 and concluded with the Final on February 21, 2016.

== Venue ==
Niš	2015–16 Radivoj Korać Cup (Serbia)
Čair Sports Center	2015–16 Radivoj Korać Cup (Serbia)
Capacity: 4,500	2015–16 Radivoj Korać Cup (Serbia)

== Teams ==
Eight teams competed in this years cup.

Seeded	Unseeded
Mega Leks	Konstantin
Metalac	Borac Čačak
Crvena zvezda	Smederevo 1953
Partizan	FMP

== Bracket ==
Quarterfinals; February 18 and 19		Semifinals; February 20		Final; February 21
Mega Leks	78
Konstantin	61	Mega Leks	97
Metalac	96	Metalac	86
Borac Čačak	86			Mega Leks	85
Partizan	85			Partizan	80
FMP	83	Partizan	68
Crvena zvezda	89	Crvena zvezda	60
Smederevo 1953	44

=== Quarterfinals ===
18 February 2016
17:00

Mega Leks	78–61	Konstantin
Scoring by quarter: 13–17, 22–15, 24–20, 19–9
Pts: Zagorac, Simeunović 15; Rebs: Zagorac 13; Asts: Ivanović 7		Pts: Tasić 23; Rebs: Gudžić 8 Asts: Veličković 6

Čair Sports Center, Niš
Attendance: 1,800
Referees: Nešković, Vesković, Pecelj

18 February 2016
21:00

Partizan	85–83	FMP
Scoring by quarter: 24–21, 25–19, 18–17, 18–26
Pts: Kevin Jones 21; Rebs: Williams 9 Asts: Cvetković, Wilson 4		Pts: Dobrić 23; Rebs: Apić 9 Asts: Čović 3

Čair Sports Center, Niš
Attendance: 3,300
Referees: Glišić, Juras, Mrdak

19 February 2016
18:00

Metalac	96–86 (OT)	Borac Čačak
Scoring by quarter: 19–26, 21–14, 22–28, 22–16, Overtime: 12–2
Pts: Jevtović 27; Rebs: Rakićević 11; Asts: Rakićević 10		Pts: Stevanović 25; Rebs: Mićović, Stanojević 8 Asts: Avramović 9

Čair Sports Center, Niš
Attendance: 1,500
Referees: Mažić, Čukalović, Prpa

19 February 2016
21:00

Crvena zvezda	89–44	Smederevo 1953
Scoring by quarter: 30–12, 17–12, 14–11, 28–9
Pts: Rebić 15; Rebs: Štimac 10; Asts: Rebić, Gudurić 4		Pts: Đorđević 13; Rebs: Vasilić 14; Asts: Antić 3

Čair Sports Center, Niš
Attendance: 3,300
Referees: Jevtović, Ninković, Milovanović

=== Semifinals ===
20 February 2016
17:00

Mega Leks	97–86	Metalac
Scoring by quarter: 22–20, 25–16, 34–24, 16–26
Pts: Nikolić 24; Rebs: Janković 8 Asts: Ivanović 10		Pts: Rakićević 18; Rebs: Majstorović, Rakićević 7 Asts: Rakićević 6

Čair Sports Center, Niš
Attendance: 3,000
Referees: Juras, Maričić, Obrknežević

20 February 2016
21:00

Partizan	68–60	Crvena zvezda
Scoring by quarter: 17–13, 16–12, 19–14, 16–21
Pts: Kevin Jones 19; Rebs: Kevin Jones 8 Asts: Cvetković 3		Pts: Kinsey 22; Rebs: Zirbes 12; Asts: Micić 5

Čair Sports Center, Niš
Attendance: 4,000
Referees: Belošević, Jovčić, Vojinović

=== Final ===
21 February 2016	Mega Leks	85–80	Partizan	Čair Sports Center, Niš
21:00	Scoring by quarter: 24–23, 22–25, 20–16, 19–16
	Pts: Ivanović 24; Rebs: Janković 7 Asts: Ivanović, Luwawu 5		Pts: Wilson 17; Rebs: Williams 12; Asts: Wilson 5	Attendance: 4,000; Referees: Belošević, Jovčić, Obrknežević

Mega Leks

MVP

(Montenegro) Nikola Ivanović

2016 Radivoj Korać Cup Champions
Mega Leks
1st title

Partizan
