= 2008–09 Radivoj Korać Cup =

2009 Radivoj Korać Cup
- Season: 2008–09
- Duration: 18–21 February 2009
- Games played: 7
- Teams: 8

Regular season
- Season MVP: (Serbia) Novica Veličković

Finals
- Champions: Partizan Igokea
- Runners-up: Crvena zvezda

The 2009 Radivoj Korać Cup is the 7th season of the Serbian men's national basketball cup tournament. The Žućko's Left Trophy was awarded to the winner Partizan Igokea from Belgrade.

== Venue ==
Niš	2008–09 Radivoj Korać Cup (Serbia)
Čair Sports Center	2008–09 Radivoj Korać Cup (Serbia)
Capacity: 5,000 expanded	2008–09 Radivoj Korać Cup (Serbia)

== Qualified teams ==
ABA NLB League	Basketball League of Serbia	Cup of Serbia (2nd-tier)
Crvena zvezda FMP; Hemofarm STADA; Partizan Igokea; Vojvodina Srbijagas	Borac (1st)^{1} Lions (2nd)^{1}	Metalac (Winner)

^{1} League table position after 13 rounds played

== Bracket ==
Quarterfinals
18 February
Partizan Igokea	87
Vojvodina Srbijagas	58
18 February
Hemofarm STADA	80
Borac	75
19 February
FMP	81
Lions	68
19 February
Crvena zvezda	83
Metalac	66

Semifinals
20 February
Partizan Igokea	83
Hemofarm STADA	67
20 February
FMP	73
Crvena zvezda	85

Final
21 February
Partizan Igokea	80
Crvena zvezda	65

== Quarterfinals ==
18 February 2008
18:00

Report

Partizan Igokea	87–58	Vojvodina Srbijagas
Scoring by quarter: 12–18, 32–14, 19–11, 26–15
Pts: Veličković 17		Pts: Bajić 19

Čair Sports Center, Niš

18 February 2008
20:30

Report

Hemofarm STADA	80–75	Borac
Scoring by quarter: 19–13, 17–14, 20–21, 24–27
Pts: Marković 21		Pts: Žigeranović 29

Čair Sports Center, Niš

19 February 2008
18:00

Report

FMP	81–68	Lions
Scoring by quarter: 20–21, 20–25, 22–13, 19–9
Pts: Raduljica 14		Pts: Ocokoljić 16

Čair Sports Center, Niš

19 February 2008
20:30

Report

Crvena zvezda	83–66	Metalac
Scoring by quarter: 16–20, 24–23, 19–11, 24–12
Pts: Dragićević 20		Pts: Mićević 16

Čair Sports Center, Niš

== Semifinals ==
20 February 2008
18:00

Partizan Igokea	87–63	Hemofarm STADA
Scoring by quarter: 16–25, 23–11, 21–7, 23–24

Čair Sports Center, Niš

20 February 2008
20:30

FMP	80–85	Crvena zvezda
Scoring by quarter: 22–30, 20–20, 22–17, 16–18

Čair Sports Center, Niš

== Final ==
21 February 2008
18:00

Report

Partizan Igokea	80–65	Crvena zvezda
Scoring by quarter: 21–19, 25–13, 15–17, 19–16
Pts: Veličković 18		Pts: Owens 15

Čair Sports Center, Niš

== See also ==
- 2008–09 Basketball League of Serbia
- Milan Ciga Vasojević Cup
