= Reggie Freeman =

American basketball player (born 1975)

Personal information
- Born: May 17, 1975 (age 51) The Bronx, New York, U.S.
- Listed height: 6 ft 6 in (1.98 m)
- Listed weight: 220 lb (100 kg)

Career information
- High school: Rice (Manhattan, New York)
- College: Texas (1993–1997)
- NBA draft: 1997: undrafted
- Playing career: 1997–2009
- Position: Shooting guard
- Number: 5

Career history
- 1997–1998: Connecticut Pride
- 1998–1999: Quad City Thunder
- 1999: Long Island Surf
- 1999: Gallitos de Isabela
- 1999–2000: İstanbul Teknik Üniversitesi
- 2000: Indios de Mayagüez
- 2001: Indiana Legends
- 2001: Cocodrilos de Caracas
- 2001–2002: Cibona Zagreb
- 2002: Euro Roseto
- 2002: ASVEL Basket
- 2002–2003: FMP
- 2003: Crvena zvezda
- 2003–2005: Reflex
- 2005: NIS Vojvodina
- 2005–2006: Žalgiris Kaunas
- 2006–2007: Upea Capo d'Orlando
- 2007–2008: Rethymno
- 2008: Stal Ostrów Wielkopolski
- 2009: Metalac Valjevo

Career highlights
- Adriatic League champion (2004); French League champion (2002); 2× Radivoj Korać Cup champion (2003, 2005); First-team All-Big 12 (1997); First-team All-SWC (1996); AP honorable mention All-American (1997)

Reginald Philip Freeman (born May 17, 1975) is an American former professional basketball player.

== Playing career ==
Freeman played NCAA college basketball at the University of Texas. He had a prolific career at Texas, making All-Conference First Team in both his junior and senior seasons. Widely considered a first round draft candidate in the 1997 NBA draft, he nevertheless went undrafted.

Although he never made it to the NBA, Freeman played professionally in several countries on three continents. Basketball club KK FMP from Serbia retired his jersey with number #5 for the great contribution he had made during his tenure with the team. He is regarded as one of the best foreign players to ever play for any Serbian basketball team.

== National team career ==
Freeman was a member of the U.S. Virgin Islands national basketball team at the 2009 FIBA Americas Championship.

== Career statistics ==
Legend
GP	Games played	GS	Games started	MPG	Minutes per game
FG%	Field-goal percentage	3P%	3-point field-goal percentage	FT%	Free-throw percentage
RPG	Rebounds per game	APG	Assists per game	SPG	Steals per game
BPG	Blocks per game	PPG	Points per game	PIR	Performance index rating
**Bold**	Career high

=== EuroLeague ===
Year	Team	GP	GS	MPG	FG%	3P%	FT%	RPG	APG	SPG	BPG	PPG	PIR
2001–02	Cibona	12	1	25.1	**.436**	.294	**.795**	**4.3**	1.7	.9	**.4**	10.7	9.7
2005–06	Žalgiris	**19**	**18**	**30.9**	.397	**.349**	.788	3.8	**2.3**	**1.3**	.1	**11.2**	**9.8**
Career		31	19	28.6	.410	.328	.791	4.0	2.1	1.1	.2	11.0	9.8
