= 2005–06 Radivoj Korać Cup =

2006 Radivoj Korać Cup
- Season: 2005–06
- Duration: 15–19 February 2006
- Games played: 8
- Teams: 9

Regular season
- Season MVP: (Serbia and Montenegro) Goran Jeretin

Finals
- Champions: Crvena zvezda
- Runners-up: Hemofarm

The 2006 Radivoj Korać Cup was the fourth season of the Serbian-Montenegrin men's national basketball cup tournament. The Žućko's Left Trophy awarded to the winner Crvena zvezda from Belgrade.

It was the last time that the Cup was organized in Serbia and Montenegro.

== Venue ==
Belgrade	2005–06 Radivoj Korać Cup (Serbia and Montenegro)
Pionir Hall	2005–06 Radivoj Korać Cup (Serbia and Montenegro)
Capacity: 5,878	2005–06 Radivoj Korać Cup (Serbia and Montenegro)

== Qualified teams ==
ABA Goodyear League	YUBA League	Local Cups
Crvena zvezda FMP; Hemofarm; NIS Vojvodina; Partizan Pivara MB	Budućnost; Mašinac	Atlas (Cup of Serbia Winner); Lovćen (Cup of Montenegro Winner)

== Bracket ==
Quarterfinals
16 February
FMP	80
Mašinac	63
16 February
Hemofarm	93
NIS Vojvodina	81
17 February
Crvena zvezda	78
Atlas^{QUAL}	65
17 February
Partizan Pivara MB	100
Budućnost	81

Semifinals
18 February
FMP	70
Hemofarm	78
18 February
Crvena zvezda	92
Partizan Pivara MB	83

Final
19 February
Hemofarm	65
Crvena zvezda	80

== Qualifications ==
15 February 2005
17:30

Report

Atlas	56–49	Lovćen
Scoring by quarter: 6–12, 23–10, 9–14, 18–13
Pts: Kosanović, Duvnjak 13; Rebs: Kosanović 9		Pts: Raičković 12

Pionir Hall, Belgrade
Attendance: 300

== Quarterfinals ==
16 February 2005
17:30

Report

FMP	80–63	Mašinac
Scoring by quarter: 16–19, 30–15, 15–15, 19–14
Pts: Savanović 27		Pts: Mirković 13

Pionir Hall, Belgrade

16 February 2006
20:00

Report

Hemofarm	93–81	NIS Vojvodina
Scoring by quarter: 22–20, 21–27, 29–17, 21–17
Pts: Wright 25		Pts: Plisnić 15

Pionir Hall, Belgrade

17 February 2006
17:30

Report

Crvena zvezda	78–65	Atlas
Scoring by quarter: 26–12, 16–15, 21–18, 15–20
Pts: O'Bannon 12		Pts: Mišković 10

Pionir Hall, Belgrade

17 February 2006
20:00

Report

Partizan Pivara MB	100–81	Budućnost
Scoring by quarter: 22–21, 33–26, 20–17, 25–17
Pts: Milojević 21		Pts: Pavković 21

Pionir Hall, Belgrade

== Semifinals ==
18 February 2006
17:30

Report

Crvena zvezda	92–83	Partizan Pivara MB
Scoring by quarter: 21–25, 24–15, 19–17, 28–26
Pts: Henderson 20		Pts: Tripković 22; Rebs: Milojević 11

Pionir Hall, Belgrade

18 February 2006
20:00

Report

FMP	70–78	Hemofarm
Scoring by quarter: 17–17, 16–13, 16–25, 21–25
Pts: Savanović, Rašić 18		Pts: Vukosavljević 20

Pionir Hall, Belgrade

== Final ==
19 February 2006
18:00

Report

Hemofarm	65–80	Crvena zvezda
Scoring by quarter: 15–26, 18–23, 7–18, 25–13
Pts: Wright 20		Pts: Jeretin, Gurović 17; Rebs: Raičević 10; Asts: Jeretin 6

Pionir Hall, Belgrade
Attendance: 4,500
Referees: Milivoje Jovčić, Ilija Belošević, Zoran Šutulović
