= 2013–14 Radivoj Korać Cup =

Radivoj Korać Cup 2014
- League: Radivoj Korać Cup
- Sport: Basketball
- Duration: 6–9 February 2014
- Top scorer: Raško Katić
- Finals champions: Crvena Zvezda
- Runners-up: Mega Vizura
- Finals MVP: Vasilije Micić

Radivoj Korać Cup seasons
- ← 2012–13 2014–15 →

The 2014 Radivoj Korać Cup season was the 12th season of the Serbian national basketball cup tournament.

The competition started on February 6 and concluded with the Final on February 9, 2014.

== Teams ==
Eight teams competed in this years cup.

Seeded	Unseeded
Radnički	Crnokosa
Crvena Zvezda	FMP
Partizan	OKK Beograd
Mega Vizura	Borac Čačak

== Bracket ==
Quarterfinals; February 6 and 7		Semifinals; February 8		Final; February 9
Crvena Zvezda	81
Borac Čačak	62	Crvena Zvezda	82
Radnički	87	Radnički	78
OKK Beograd	72			Crvena Zvezda	81
Partizan	89			Mega Vizura	80
FMP	95	FMP	85
Mega Vizura	88	Mega Vizura	93
Crnokosa	76

=== Quarterfinals ===
6 February 2014
18:30

Report

Crvena Zvezda	81–62	Borac Čačak
Scoring by quarter: 23-11, 18-11, 19-17, 21-23
Pts: Jenkins 14; Rebs: Marjanović 11; Asts: Dragićević 4		Pts: Mandić 15; Rebs: Mandić 7 Asts: Dumić 3

Pionir Hall
Belgrade, Serbia
Attendance: 2,500
Referees: Vladimir Jevtović, Uroš Nikolić, Nemanja Ninković.

6 February 2014
21:00

Report

Radnički	87–72	OKK Beograd
Scoring by quarter: 10-23, 27-11, 26-18, 24-20
Pts: Lešić, Birčević 15; Rebs: Birčević, Kalinić 6 Asts: Jović 6		Pts: Bojić 26; Rebs: Bojić 8 Asts: Malidžan 6

Pionir Hall
Belgrade, Serbia
Attendance: 1,500
Referees: Aleksandar Glišić, Milan Mažić, Radoš Arsenijević.

7 February 2014
18:30

Report

Partizan	89–95 (OT)	FMP
Scoring by quarter: 17-22, 21-23, 24-17, 18-18, Overtime: 9-15
Pts: Aranitović 20; Rebs: Gagić 12; Asts: Dallo 5		Pts: Čvorović 27; Rebs: Čvorović 11; Asts: Gudurić 8

Pionir Hall
Belgrade, Serbia
Attendance: 3,000
Referees: Miodrag Licina, Ivan Stefanović, Jasmina Juras.

7 February 2014
21:00

Report

Mega Vizura	88–76	Crnokosa
Scoring by quarter: 18-17, 27-18, 25-23, 18-18
Pts: Micić 21; Rebs: Radović 9 Asts: Miljenović 4		Pts: Radić 18; Rebs: Papić 8 Asts: Djordjević 4

Pionir Hall
Belgrade, Serbia
Attendance: 1,000
Referees: Branislav Mrdak, Marko Pecelj, Predrag Milovanović.

=== Semifinals ===
8 February 2014
17:00

Report

Crvena Zvezda	82–78	Radnički
Scoring by quarter: 21-19, 25-15, 12-30, 24-14
Pts: Nelson 21; Rebs: Katić 8 Asts: Nelson, Jenkins 2		Pts: Marinović 21; Rebs: Marinović, Birčević 6 Asts: Marinović 6

Pionir Hall
Belgrade, Serbia
Attendance: 5,300
Referees: Milija Vojinović, Dragan Nešković, Uroš Obrkežević

8 February 2014
21:00

Report

FMP	85–93	Mega Vizura
Scoring by quarter: 20-28, 31-18, 10-28, 24-19
Pts: Gudurić 19; Rebs: Gudurić 8 Asts: Dundjerski 4		Pts: Micić 27; Rebs: Jokić 8 Asts: Miljenović 6

Pionir Hall
Belgrade, Serbia
Attendance: 1,500
Referees: Milivoje Jovčić, Marko Juras, Saša Maričić.

=== Final ===
9 February 2014
20:30

Report

Crvena Zvezda	81–80	Mega Vizura
Scoring by quarter: 15-31, 27-11, 19-18, 20-20
Pts: Katić 21; Rebs: Katić 12; Asts: Jenkins 5		Pts: Micić, Varda 18; Rebs: Jokić 9 Asts: Micić 9

Pionir Hall
Belgrade, Serbia
Attendance: 7,500
Referees: Ilija Belošević, Milivoje Jovčić, Milija Vojinović.

Radivoj Korać Cup 2014 Champions

Crvena zvezda
7th Cup
