= KK Ergonom =

Defunct basketball club in Niš, Serbia

Ergonom
- Founded: 13 May 1970; 56 years ago
- Dissolved: 2011; 15 years ago
- History: KK Ergonom; 1970–1984; 1999–2011
- Arena: Čair Sports Center
- Capacity: 4,000
- Location: Niš, Serbia
- Team colors: Green, white, orange
- Championships: 1 Serbian League Cup

Košarkaški klub Ergonom (Serbian Cyrillic: Кошаркашки клуб Ергоном, transl. Ergonom Basketball Club), commonly referred to as KK Ergonom, was a men's professional basketball club based in Niš, Serbia. The club used to compete in the top-tiers YUBA League and Basketball League of Serbia. Their home arena was the Čair Sports Center.

== History ==
The club was founded on 13 May 1970 in Niš, SR Serbia. On 25 April 1971, the lost their inaugural game to Jagodina. During the 1983–84 season, the club was dissolved. In 1999, the club was re-established under the same name.

In 2003, the club won the 2nd-tier Cup of Serbia and got qualified for the 2003 Radivoj Korać Cup.

== Home arena ==
Ergonom used to play its home games at the Čair Sports Center. The hall is located in Niš and was built in 1974. It has a seating capacity of 4,000 seats.

== Coaches ==
- (Serbia and Montenegro) Dragan Tomanović (1999–2001)
- (Serbia and Montenegro) Ljubomir Poček (2001–2002)
- (Serbia and Montenegro) Srećko Sekulović (2002–2005)
- (Serbia) Predrag Jaćimović (2005–2008)
- (Serbia) Ljubiša Aničić (2008)
- (Serbia) Vlada Jovanović (2008–2009)
- (Serbia) Jovica Antonić (2009–2010)

== Season by season ==
Season	Tier	Division	Pos.	Postseason	W–L	National Cup
1999–00	4	2nd Serb League	1	—	N/A	—
2000–01	3	1st Serb League	N/A	—	N/A	—
2001–02	2	YUBA B League	8	—	12–14	—
2002–03	2	YUBA B League	2	—	15–5	Quarterfinalist
2003–04	1	BLSM First League	9	—	8–14	—
2004–05	1	BLSM First League	6	—	14–12	Quarterfinalist
2005–06	1	BLSM First League	8	—	10–12	—
2006–07	1	BLS First League	10	—	8–14	—
2007–08	1	BLS First League	12	—	2–20	—
2008–09	1	BLS First League	7	—	12–14	—
2009–10	1	BLS First League	13	—	5–21	—
2010–11	4	2nd Reg League	10	—	0–18	—

== Trophies and awards ==
=== Trophies ===
- YUBA B League (2nd-tier)
  - Runners-up (1): 2002–03
- League Cup of Serbia (2nd-tier)
  - Winner (1): 2002–03
  - Runners-up (1): 2004–05

== Notable players ==
Note: Flags indicate national team eligibility at FIBA-sanctioned events. Players may hold other non-FIBA nationalities not displayed.

Criteria

To appear in this section a player must have either:

- Set a club record or won an individual award while at the club
- Played at least one official international match for their national team at any time
- Played at least one official NBA match at any time.

- (Serbia and Montenegro) Raško Katić
- (Serbia and Montenegro) Vladimir Đokić
- (Serbia and Montenegro) Marko Simonović
- (Bosnia and Herzegovina) Aleksej Nešović
- (North Macedonia) Srdjan Stanković

== See also ==
- OKK Konstantin
- KK Fair Play
