= 2007–08 Radivoj Korać Cup =

2008 Radivoj Korać Cup
- Season: 2007–08
- Duration: 7–10 February 2008
- Games played: 7
- Teams: 8

Regular season
- Season MVP: (Serbia) Milenko Tepić

Finals
- Champions: Partizan Igokea
- Runners-up: Hemofarm STADA

Awards
- Top Scorer: (Serbia) Dušan Kecman

The 2008 Radivoj Korać Cup is the 6th season of the Serbian men's national basketball cup tournament. The Žućko's Left Trophy was awarded to the winner Partizan Igokea from Belgrade.

== Venue ==
Niš	2007–08 Radivoj Korać Cup (Serbia)
Čair Sports Center	2007–08 Radivoj Korać Cup (Serbia)
Capacity: 5,000 expanded	2007–08 Radivoj Korać Cup (Serbia)

== Qualified teams ==
ABA NLB League	Basketball League of Serbia	Cup of Serbia (2nd-tier)
Crvena zvezda FMP; Hemofarm STADA; Partizan Igokea; Vojvodina Srbijagas	Lions (1st)^{1} Borac (2nd)^{1}	Zdravlje Actavis (Winner)

^{1} League table position after 11 rounds played

=== Draw ===
The draw was held in Belgrade on 16 January 2008.

Seeded	Unseeded
Crvena zvezda mts	Borac Čačak
FMP	Lions
Hemofarm STADA	Cup of Serbia Winner
Partizan Igokea	Vojvodina Srbijagas

== Bracket ==
Quarterfinals
7 February
Crvena zvezda	79
Borac	54
7 February
Hemofarm STADA	88
Zdravlje Actavis	80
8 February
FMP	84
Vojvodina Srbijagas	73
8 February
Partizan Igokea	83
Lions	68

Semifinals
9 February
Crvena zvezda	68
Hemofarm STADA	76
9 February
FMP	73
Partizan Igokea	85

Final
10 February
Hemofarm STADA	64
Partizan Igokea	73

== Quarterfinals ==
7 February 2008
17:30

Report

Crvena zvezda	79–54	Borac
Scoring by quarter: 27–16, 19–17, 17–18, 16–3
Pts: Dragićević 19		Pts: Dramićanin 15

Čair Sports Center, Niš
Attendance: 3,000
Referees: Vojinović, Sedlar, Glišić

7 February 2008
20:00

Report

Hemofarm STADA	88–80	Zdravlje Actavis
Scoring by quarter: 28–26, 25–18, 24–14, 11–22
Pts: Marshall 22		Pts: Marojević 23

Čair Sports Center, Niš
Attendance: 1,500
Referees: Mrdak, Čukalović, Pecelj

8 February 2008
17:30

Report

FMP	84–73	Vojvodina Srbijagas
Scoring by quarter: 19–17, 16–15, 23–15, 26–26
Pts: Erceg 25; Rebs: Labović, Krstović 6 Asts: Jeremić, Protić 5		Pts: Németh 19; Rebs: Bajić 9 Asts: Peković 6

Čair Sports Center, Niš
Attendance: 2,200
Referees: Mazić, Juras, Ličina

8 February 2008
20:00

Report

Partizan Igokea	83–68	Lions
Scoring by quarter: 25–16, 16–10, 26–20, 16–22
Pts: Veličković 18; Rebs: Veličković 7 Asts: Tepić 6		Pts: Mladenović 20; Rebs: Mladenović 8

Čair Sports Center, Niš
Attendance: 3,500
Referees: Nešković, Maričić, Obrknežević

== Semifinals ==
9 February 2008
17:30

Report

Crvena zvezda	68–76	Hemofarm STADA
Pts: Mišanović 15; Rebs: Dragićević 16; Asts: Cook 9		Pts: Vukosavljević 17; Rebs: Božović 10

Čair Sports Center, Niš
Attendance: 3,500
Referees: Vojinović, Jovčić, Mrdak

9 February 2008
20:00

Report

FMP	73–85	Partizan Igokea
Scoring by quarter: 20–20, 14–28, 24–16, 15–21
Pts: Protić 15; Rebs: Erceg 9		Pts: Tepić 27; Rebs: Tepić 7 Asts: Kecman 5

Čair Sports Center, Niš
Attendance: 3,500
Referees: Nešković, Belošević, Mazić

== Final ==
10 February 2008
20:00

Report

Hemofarm STADA	64–73	Partizan Igokea
Scoring by quarter: 9–22, 19–16, 17–17, 19–18
Pts: Božović 13		Pts: Kecman 15

Čair Sports Center, Niš
Attendance: 5,000
Referees: Belošević, Jovčić, Vojinović

== See also ==
- 2007–08 Basketball League of Serbia
- Milan Ciga Vasojević Cup
