= Goran Jeretin =

Montenegrin basketball player

Goran Jeretin Горан Јеретин
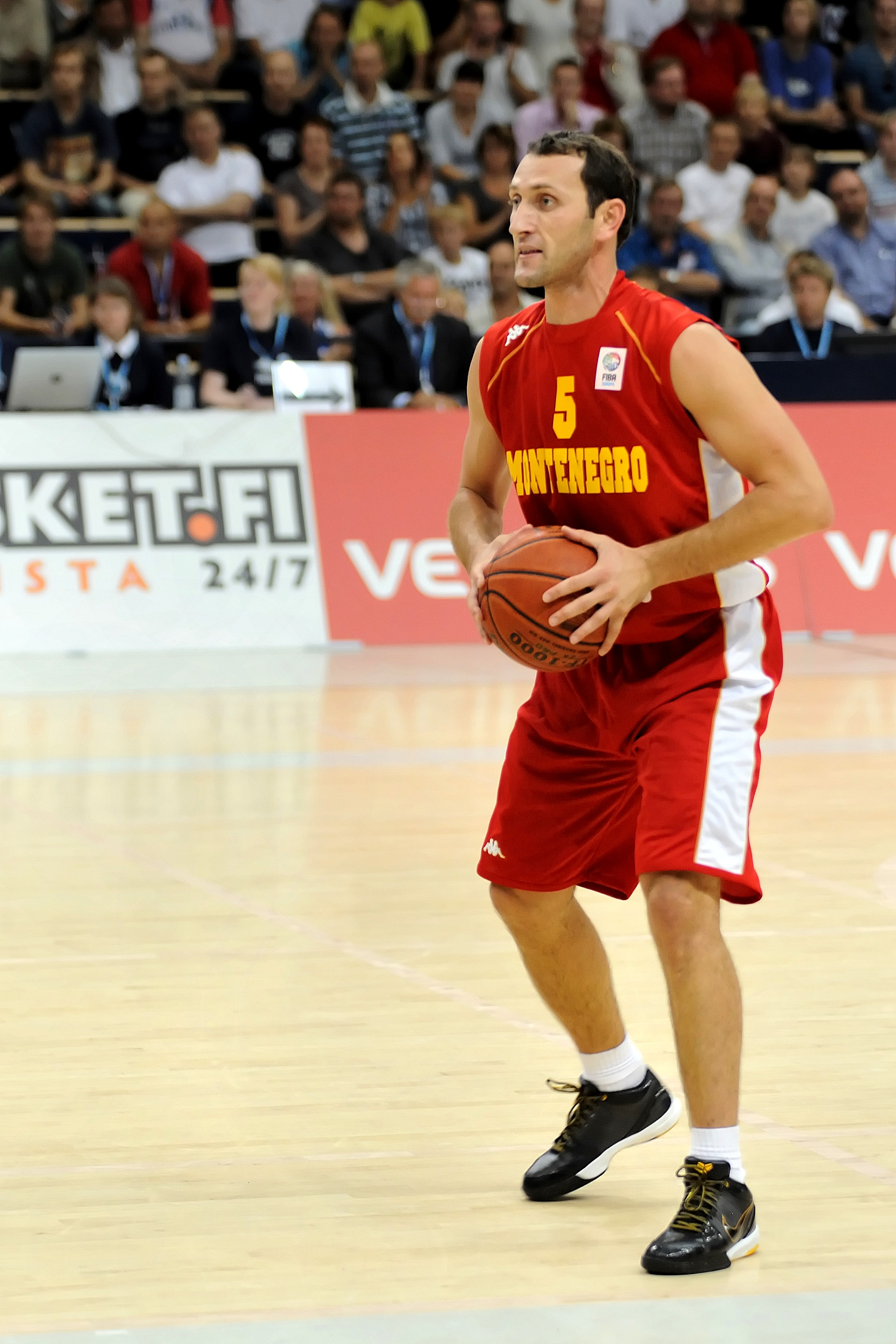

Personal information
- Born: 17 September 1979 (age 47) Nikšić, SR Montenegro, SFR Yugoslavia
- Listed height: 1.92 m (6 ft 4 in)
- Listed weight: 95 kg (209 lb)

Career information
- NBA draft: 2001: undrafted
- Playing career: 2000–2013
- Position: Point guard

Career history
- 2000–2001: Ibon Nikšić
- 2001–2002: Lovćen
- 2002–2006: Crvena zvezda
- 2006: Dynamo Saint Petersburg
- 2006: Budućnost Podgorica
- 2007: Maccabi Tel Aviv
- 2007–2008: Alba Berlin
- 2008–2009: BC Kyiv
- 2009: AEL Limassol
- 2009–2010: Budućnost Podgorica
- 2010: Türk Telekom
- 2010–2011: Lokomotiv Kuban
- 2011: Lietuvos rytas
- 2011–2012: Artland Dragons
- 2012: Union Olimpija
- 2012–2013: AEK Larnaca

Career highlights
- 2× Serbian Cup MVP (2004, 2006); 2× Serbian Cup winner (2004, 2006); Israeli League champion (2007); Montenegrin Cup winner (2010)

Goran Jeretin (Serbian Cyrillic: Горан Јеретин; born 17 September 1979) is a Montenegrin former professional basketball player.

== Professional career ==
His first team was Ibon, where he played until 2001, when he moved to KK Lovćen. He played there for a year, proving himself as one of the brightest young talents in the country, which recommended him for the Yugoslav youth basketball team. While in China with the national team, he signed a contract with KK Crvena zvezda. He stayed in Belgrade for 3 years, helping Crvena zvezda win the 2004 National Cup. Surviving tough competition in Belgrade, with Scoonie Penn and Igor Rakočević playing alongside him, he established himself as one of the top guards in the Adriatic League.

After a very successful campaign in Belgrade, he moved to BC Dynamo Saint Petersburg, but failed to play a single game there, as the Russian club went bankrupt before the season started. At the peak of his career, without a contract in the middle of competitive season in Europe, he was offered a contract from the most successful Montenegrin basketball team, KK Budućnost. To his disappointment, the team did not compete in any of the European basketball competitions. It is, however, a highly competitive team in the Adriatic League, and Jeretin quickly became heart and soul of the talented, but extremely young squad. His average of 18 points per game was just a small piece of his great all around performance this year. He helped Budućnost beat KK Crvena zvezda, KK Partizan, KK Union Olimpija among others. His dominant performance in Adriatic League brought him to the attention of one of the greatest European teams, Maccabi Tel Aviv. He signed an 18-month contract with Israeli team in January 2007, playing his first game for the team on 1 February 2007. On 17 July 2007, Jeretin signed for the 2007–08 season with German club Alba Berlin.

During the 2008–09 season, Jeretin played for Proteas EKA AEL and then BC Kyiv. On 3 September 2009 he was signed by KK Budućnost. He also played for Türk Telekom B.K. (2010), PBC Lokomotiv-Kuban (2010–11) and BC Lietuvos rytas (2011). In November he signed a one-year contract with Artland Dragons in Germany.

On 12 January 2012, Union Olimpija signed him for one season. On 31 December 2012, Jeretin signed with the Cypriot team AEK Larnaca until the end of the season.

== National team career ==
While being one of the top guards in Serbia and Montenegro in past few years, he never had a true chance to show his skills in the senior national team, due to tough competition. In an interview given to Montenegrin TV station IN TV, he stated that he would play for the Montenegrin national team.

== Post-playing career ==
Jeretin was a general manager of Sutjeska.

== Player profile ==
Jeretin is a combo guard, with a height of 192 cm (6 feet 4 inches),. He is a good ball-handler and passer, and a very good shooter, making him very difficult to guard. He scores in clusters from the perimeter, medium range, as well as while driving to the basket. He is considered quick and strong for a guard, allowing him to play very tough defense. At Budućnost, he also showed his ability to perform under pressure, hitting several clutch shots.
