= Radivoj Korać Cup =

Basketball tournament in Serbia

Radivoj Korać Cup Куп Радивој(а) Кораћ(а) Kup Radivoj(a) Korać(a)
- Sport: Basketball
- Founded: 2002; 24 years ago
- No. of teams: 8
- Country: Serbia and Montenegro; 2002–2006; Serbia; 2006–present
- Continent: (European Union) FIBA Europe (Europe)
- Most recent champion: Crvena zvezda (12th title) (2026)
- Most titles: 12; Crvena zvezda
- Broadcaster: Arena Sport
- Sponsor: Triglav Osiguranje
- Website: kss.rs
- 2026 Cup

The Radivoj Korać Cup (Serbian: Куп Радивој(а) Кораћ(а), Kup Radivoj(a) Korać(a)) is the men's national basketball cup of Serbia. It is run by the Basketball Federation of Serbia named after Serbian basketball legend, FIBA Hall of Fame and Basketball Hall of Fame member Radivoj Korać. It succeeded the Federal Republic of Yugoslavia Basketball Cup.

Crvena zvezda have the most Radivoj Korać Cup titles at 12.

== History ==
In 2003, the Cup got its name on proposal from Hemofarm, due to the abolition of the eponymous European competition and the name change of the Federal Republic of Yugoslavia into the State Union of Serbia and Montenegro. After the separation of Serbia and Montenegro in 2006, the Cup has become the national cup in Serbia.

According to the agreement from 2011 between the Basketball Federation of Serbia (KSS) and FIBA, KSS supported to give the original replica of the trophy of the FIBA Korać Cup to a national cup winner in Serbia. So this trophy (named Žućkova levica, transl. The Žućko's Left Hand) was first awarded to the Cup winner in 2013.

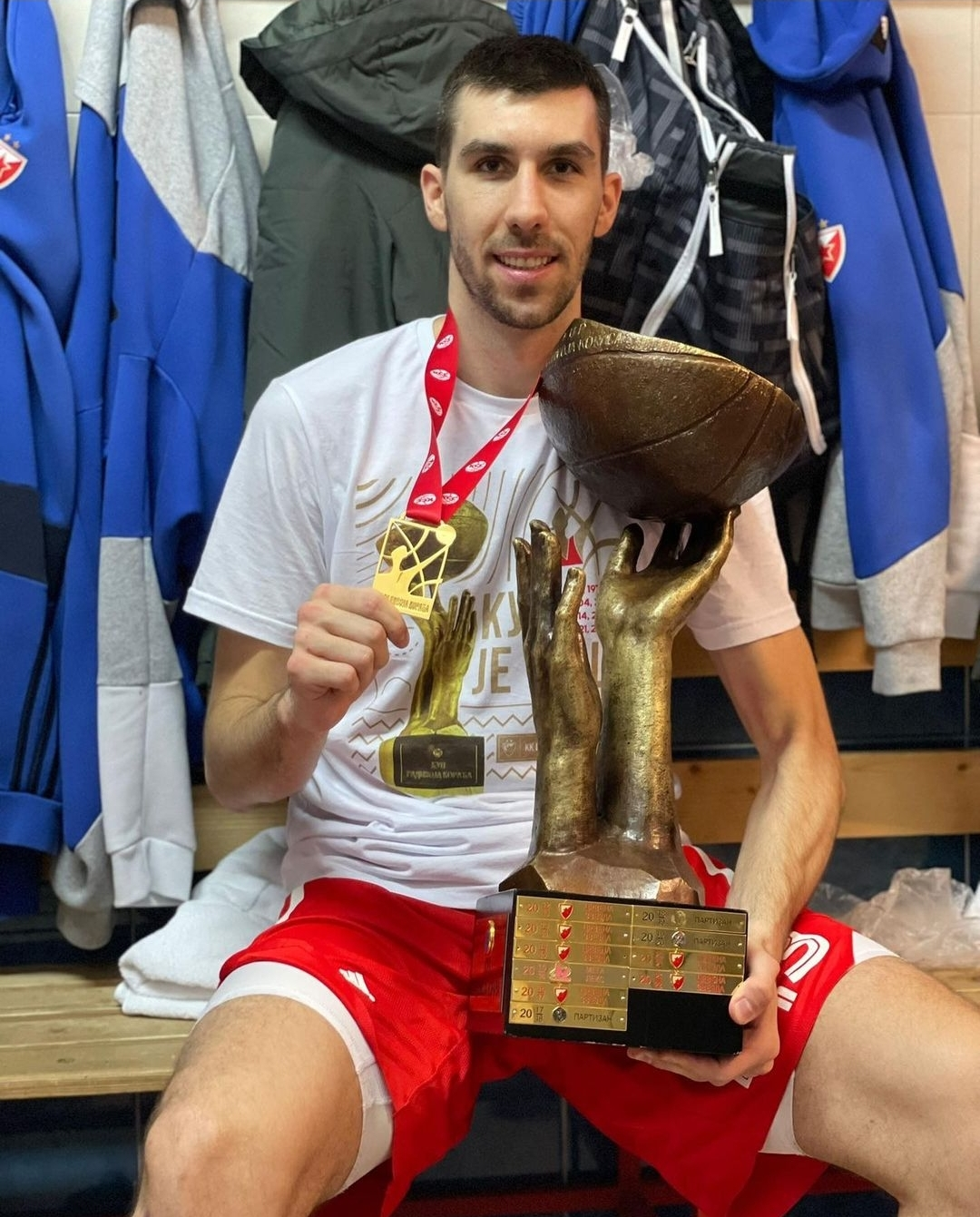
Ognjen Dobrić of Crvena zvezda holding the trophy in 2022

== Title holders ==
Serbia and Montenegro

- 2002–03 FMP
- 2003–04 Crvena zvezda
- 2004–05 FMP (Reflex)
- 2005–06 Crvena zvezda

Serbia

- 2006–07 FMP
- 2007–08 Partizan
- 2008–09 Partizan
- 2009–10 Partizan
- 2010–11 Partizan
- 2011–12 Partizan
- 2012–13 Crvena zvezda
- 2013–14 Crvena zvezda
- 2014–15 Crvena zvezda
- 2015–16 Mega Basket (Mega Leks)
- 2016–17 Crvena zvezda
- 2017–18 Partizan
- 2018–19 Partizan
- 2019–20 Partizan
- 2020–21 Crvena zvezda
- 2021–22 Crvena zvezda
- 2022–23 Crvena zvezda
- 2023–24 Crvena zvezda
- 2024–25 Crvena zvezda
- 2025–26 Crvena zvezda

== Finals ==
Year	Host	Final		
Year	Host	Champion	Score	Runner-up
2003; Details	Čair Sports Center; Niš	FMP	88–67	Hemofarm
2004; Details	SPC Vojvodina; Novi Sad	Crvena zvezda	91–89 (OT)	Reflex
2005; Details	Millennium Centar; Vršac	Reflex	88–84	Partizan Pivara MB
2006; Details	Pionir Hall; Belgrade	Crvena zvezda	80–65	Hemofarm
2007; Details	Jezero Hall; Kragujevac	FMP	73–61	Partizan
2008; Details	Čair Sports Center; Niš	Partizan Igokea	73–64	Hemofarm
2009; Details	Čair Sports Center; Niš	Partizan Igokea	80–65	Crvena zvezda
2010; Details	Čair Sports Center; Niš	Partizan	72–62	FMP
2011; Details	Železnik Hall; Belgrade	Partizan	77–73	FMP
2012; Details	Čair Sports Center; Niš	Partizan mt:s	64–51	Crvena zvezda
2013; Details	Jezero Hall; Kragujevac	Crvena zvezda	78–69	Partizan mt:s
2014; Details	Pionir Hall; Belgrade	Crvena zvezda Telekom	81–80	Mega Vizura
2015; Details	Čair Sports Center; Niš	Crvena zvezda Telekom	80–74	Mega Leks
2016; Details	Čair Sports Center; Niš	Mega Leks	85–80	Partizan NIS
2017; Details	Čair Sports Center; Niš	Crvena zvezda mts	74–64	Partizan NIS
2018; Details	Čair Sports Center; Niš	Partizan NIS	81–75	Crvena zvezda mts
2019; Details	Čair Sports Center; Niš	Partizan NIS	76–74	Crvena zvezda mts
2020; Details	Čair Sports Center; Niš	Partizan NIS	85–84 (OT)	Crvena zvezda mts
2021; Details	SPC Vojvodina; Novi Sad	Crvena zvezda mts	73–60	Mega Soccerbet
2022; Details	Čair Sports Center; Niš	Crvena zvezda mts	85–68	Partizan NIS
2023; Details	Čair Sports Center; Niš	Crvena zvezda Meridianbet	96–79	Mega MIS
2024; Details	Čair Sports Center; Niš	Crvena zvezda Meridianbet	85–79	Partizan Mozzart Bet
2025; Details	Čair Sports Center; Niš	Crvena zvezda Meridianbet	89–83 (OT)	Partizan Mozzart Bet
2026; Details	Čair Sports Center; Niš	Crvena zvezda Meridianbet	106–84	Mega Superbet

=== Performance by club ===
Rank	Club	Titles	Runner-up	Years
1	Crvena Zvezda	12	5	2003–04, 2005–06, 2012–13, 2013–14, 2014–15, 2016–17, 2020–21, 2021–22, 2022–23, 2023–24, 2024–25, 2025–26
2	Partizan	8	8	2007–08, 2008–09, 2009–10, 2010–11, 2011–12, 2017–18, 2018–19, 2019–20
3	FMP	3	3	2002–03, 2004–05, 2006–07
4	Mega Basket	1	5	2015–16
5	Hemofarm	0	3	—

== All-time Cup winners (Yugoslavia, Serbia&Montenegro, present day Serbia) ==
Total number of national cups won by Serbian clubs. Table includes titles won during the Yugoslav Basketball Cup (1959–1992) and Federal Republic of Yugoslavia Basketball Cup (1992–2002) as well.

Club	Titles	Years won
Partizan	16	1979, 1989, 1992, 1994, 1995, 1999, 2000, 2002, 2008, 2009, 2010, 2011, 2012, 2018, 2019, 2020
Crvena zvezda	15	1971, 1973, 1975, 2004, 2006, 2013, 2014, 2015, 2017, 2021, 2022, 2023, 2024, 2025, 2026
FMP	4	1997, 2003, 2005, 2007
Beograd	3	1960, 1962, 1993
Mega	1	2016
Atlas	1	1987
Radnički	1	1976

== All-time participants ==
The following is a list of clubs who have played in the Radivoj Korać Cup at any time since its formation in 2002 to the current season.

Defunct	Defunct/Unfounded clubs
1st	Champions
2nd	Runners-up
SF	Semifinals
QF	Quarterfinals
^{C}	Teams won Cup of Serbia (2nd–tier)

Team	03	04	05	06	07	08	09	10	11	12	13	14	15	16	17	18	19	20	21	22	23	24	25	26	Total seasons	Highest finish
Atlas	–	–	SF	QF	Defunct																				2	Semifinals
Borac Čačak	–	–	–	–	–	QF	QF	–	–	–	–	QF^{C}	–	QF	–	QF	QF	QF	QF	QF	QF	QF	QF	QF	13	Quarterfinals
Borac Zemun	Unfounded							–	–	–	–	–	–	–	–	–	–	–	–	QF^{C}	–	–	–	–	1	Quarterfinals
Crnokosa	–	–	–	–	–	–	–	–	–	–	–	QF	–	–	–	–	–	–	–	–	–	–	–	–	1	Quarterfinals
Crvena zvezda	SF	1st	QF	1st	SF	SF	2nd	QF	SF	2nd	1st	1st	1st	SF	1st	2nd	2nd	2nd	1st	1st	1st	1st	1st	1st	24	Champions
Čačak 94	–	–	–	–	–	–	–	–	–	–	–	–	–	–	–	–	–	–	–	–	–	SF	–	–	1	Semifinals
Dunav	–	–	–	–	–	–	–	–	–	–	–	–	–	–	QF	–	–	–	–	–	–	–	QF^{C}	–	2	Quarterfinals
Dynamic BG	Unfounded													–	QF^{C}	QF	QF	QF	–	–	–	–	–	–	4	Quarterfinals
Ergonom	QF	–	QF	–	–	–	–	–	–	Defunct															2	Quarterfinals
FMP (Note: Includes record as Radnički Basket/Radnički FMP (2010–2012))	–	–	–	–	–	–	–	QF^{C}	QF^{C}	QF^{C}	–	SF	QF	QF^{C}	SF	SF	SF	SF	QF	SF	SF	QF	SF	QF	15	Semifinals
FMP (Note: Includes record as Reflex (2003–2005))	1st	2nd	1st	SF	1st	SF	SF	2nd	2nd	Defunct															9	Champions
Hercegovac	–	–	–	–	–	–	–	–	–	–	–	–	–	–	–	–	–	–	–	–	–	QF^{C}	–	–	1	Quarterfinals
Konstantin	Unfounded							–	–	–	–	–	QF	QF	–	–	–	–	–	–	–	–	–	–	2	Quarterfinals
Lavovi 063	–	QF	–	Defunct																					1	Quarterfinals
Mašinac	–	–	–	QF	–	–	–	–	–	–	–	Defunct													1	Quarterfinals
Mega Basket	–	–	–	–	QF	–	–	–	QF	QF	SF	2nd	2nd	1st	SF	SF	SF	SF	2nd	SF	2nd	QF	SF	2nd	17	Champions
Metalac	–	–	–	–	–	–	QF^{C}	QF	–	–	QF^{C}	–	QF	SF	–	QF	–	–	–	–	QF	–	–	–	7	Quarterfinals
Mladost Zemun	–	–	–	–	–	–	–	–	–	–	–	–	–	–	–	–	–	–	QF	–	–	–	–	–	1	Quarterfinals
Novi Pazar	–	–	–	–	–	–	–	–	–	–	–	–	–	–	–	–	QF^{C}	–	–	–	–	–	–	–	1	Quarterfinals
Novi Sad	–	–	–	–	QF	–	–	–	–	Defunct															1	Quarterfinals
OKK Beograd	–	–	–	–	–	–	–	QF	QF	–	–	QF	–	–	–	–	–	–	–	–	–	–	–	QF^{C}	4	Quarterfinals
Partizan	SF	QF	2nd	SF	2nd	1st	1st	1st	1st	1st	2nd	QF	SF	2nd	2nd	1st	1st	1st	SF	2nd	SF	2nd	2nd	SF	24	Champions
Radnički Beograd	–	–	–	–	–	–	–	–	–	QF	–	–	–	–	–	–	–	QF	–	–	–	–	–	–	2	Quarterfinals
Radnički KG 06	–	–	–	–	QF^{C}	–	–	–	–	Defunct															1	Quarterfinals
Radnički Kragujevac (Note: commonly referred to as SPD Radnički)	Unfounded													–	–	–	–	–	QF	QF	–	–	–	–	2	Quarterfinals
Radnički Kragujevac (Note: Includes record as Swisslion Vršac (2008–2009))	–	–	–	–	–	QF	QF	SF	SF	SF	SF	SF	Defunct												7	Semifinals
Sloboda	–	–	–	–	–	–	–	–	–	–	QF	–	–	–	–	–	–	QF^{C}	–	–	–	–	–	–	2	Quarterfinals
Smederevo 1953	–	–	–	–	–	–	–	–	–	–	–	–	–	QF	–	–	–	–	–	–	–	–	–	–	1	Quarterfinals
Spartak	–	–	–	–	–	–	–	–	–	–	–	–	–	–	QF	–	–	–	–	–	QF^{C}	–	QF	SF	4	Semifinals
Sveti Đorđe	–	–	–	–	–	–	–	–	–	–	–	–	–	–	–	–	QF	–	–	–	–	–	–	–	1	Quarterfinals
Vojvodina	–	–	–	–	–	–	–	–	–	–	–	–	–	–	–	–	–	–	SF^{C}	–	QF	SF	QF	–	4	Semifinals
Vojvodina Srbijagas	–	SF	QF	QF	QF	QF	QF	–	–	QF	QF	–	QF	–	Defunct										9	Quarterfinals
Vršac (Note: Includes record as Hemofarm (2003–2012))	2nd	QF	QF	2nd	SF	2nd	SF	SF	QF	SF	QF	–	SF^{C}	–	QF	–	–	–	–	–	–	–	–	–	13	Runners-up
Zdravlje	–	–	–	–	–	QF^{C}	–	–	–	–	–	–	–	–	–	–	–	–	–	–	–	–	–	–	1	Quarterfinals
Zlatibor	–	–	–	–	–	–	–	–	–	–	–	–	–	–	–	QF^{C}	–	–	–	QF	–	–	–	QF	3	Quarterfinals

Notes

Participants from Montenegro (2003–2006)

Team	03	04	05	06	Total seasons	Highest finish
Budućnost	QF	SF	SF	QF	4	Semi-finals
Lovćen	QF	QF	–	–	2	Quarter-finals
Rudar	QF	–	–	–	1	Quarter-finals

== Honours ==
- Most Valuable Player Award
- The winning head coaches

== See also ==
- Basketball Cup of Serbia
- Yugoslav Basketball Cup
- Federal Republic of Yugoslavia Basketball Cup
- Basketball League of Serbia
