= Čair Sports Center =

Sports arena in Niš, Serbia

- Хала Чаир
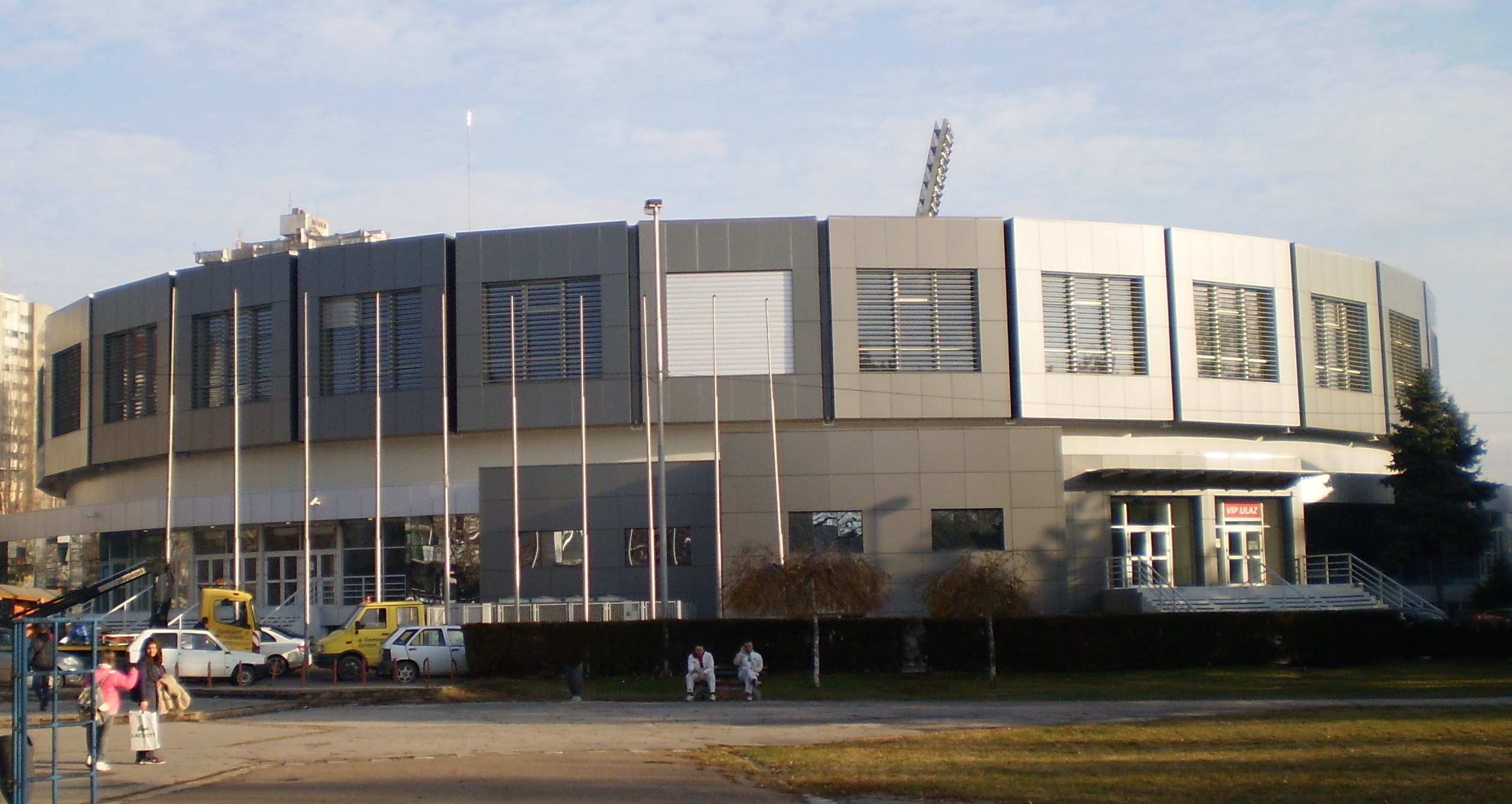
- Čair Sports Center exterior in December 2011
- Interactive map of Čair Sports Center
- Location: Niš, Serbia
- Coordinates: 43°19′01″N 21°54′28″E
- Owner: Niš
- Capacity: 4,800 (sports events); 6,500 (concerts)

Construction
- Opened: 1974; 52 years ago
- Renovated: 2011

Tenants
- OK Niš (1973–present); KMF Kalča (1994–present); KK Konstantin (2009–present); RK Železničar 1949 (2010–present)

Čair Sports Center (Serbian: Спортски центар Чаир, romanized: Sportski centar Čair), commonly known as Čair Hall (Serbian: Хала Чаир, romanized: Hala Čair) is an indoor sporting arena located in Niš, Serbia. The seating capacity of the arena is 4,800 for sports events and 6,500 at concerts. It is home to the KK Konstantin basketball team, RK Železničar 1949 handball team and OK Niš volleyball team.

== History ==
The sports center "22 December" was opened in 1973, as largest sports center in the city of Niš. Later, its name was changed to "Čair Sports Center".

It was completely reconstructed in 2011 for the needs of 2012 European Men's Handball Championship, as it was named one of tournament's venues. The reconstruction has been done according to highest European standards and criteria submitted by EHF, making Čair one of the most modern sporting halls in Serbia.

The first match played in the Hall since it was reconstructed was between the senior women's handball national teams of Serbia and Greece, on 19 October 2011 within EHF for Women 2012 Championship Qualifications.

== Sporting events ==
- Radivoj Korać Cup: 2003, 2008–2010, 2012, 2015–2019
- 2012 European Men's Handball Championship
- 2012 European Women's Handball Championship
- 2012 Davis Cup tie between Serbia and Sweden
- 2013 World Women's Handball Championship
- 2013 Fed Cup match between Serbia and Slovakia
- 2014 FIVB Volleyball Men's World Championship qualification
- 2017 Davis Cup tie between Serbia and Russia
- 2018 Davis Cup tie between Serbia and United States
- EuroBasket Women 2019 Group C

== Notable concerts ==
- 2 February 1975 – Predrag Jovičić, vocalist of the rock band San, died from an electric shock onstage.
- 8 March 1998 – Rock band Galija held a concert in the Hall. The recording of the concert was released on the live album Ja jesam odavde.
- 15 December 2011 – Hard rock band Kerber celebrated their 30th anniversary with a concert in the Hall. The concert featured numerous guests: Dragoljub Đuričić, Kornelije Kovač, Dejan Najdanović, Neverne Bebe, YU Grupa, and others.

== See also ==
- Stadion Čair
- List of indoor arenas in Serbia
