= 2023–24 KK Crvena zvezda season =

Club's season

Crvena zvezda Meridianbet
2023-2024 season season
- ABA League champions
- Serbian League champions
- Serbian Cup champions
- President: (Serbia) Nebojša Čović
- Head coach: (Montenegro) Duško Ivanović (until 21 October 2023) (Greece) Ioannis Sfairopoulos (from 22 October 2023)
- Arena: Štark Arena
- ABA League: Winners
- Playoffs: Winners
- Serbian League: Winners
- EuroLeague: 16th (11-23)
- Serbian Cup: Winners
- Adriatic Supercup: Withdrew
- Highest home attendance: 20,875; 76–85 (Spain) Barcelona (2 February 2024)
- Lowest home attendance: 3,256; 89–67 (Croatia) Split (24 December 2023)
- Average home attendance: 7275 (Adriatic League); 19308 (EuroLeague)
- Biggest win: +43; 94–51 (Slovenia) Cedevita Olimpija (8 October 2023)
- Biggest defeat: –45; 100–55 (Turkey) Anadolu Efes (11 April 2024)
Home	Away
- All statistics correct as of December 14, 2023.

The 2023–24 KK Crvena zvezda season is the 79th season in the existence of the club. For the season it is referred to as KK Crvena zvezda Meridianbet for sponsorship reasons.

== Overview ==
=== Pre-season ===
On 23 June 2023, former Serbian international guard Stefan Marković announced his retirement. During his career he won silver medals with Serbia from the Summer Olympics, World Cup and EuroBasket. He spent last two seasons of his career with the Crvena zvezda winning Adriatic league, two Serbian leagues and two Serbian cups.

On 26 June 2023, Argentine international guard Luca Vildoza left the club after spending one season with it and winning EuroLeague MVP of the Month for the month December, Serbian league and Serbian cup. He is the first Argentine to play for the club. Vildoza joined the Greek side Panathinaikos for a three-year contract.

On 29 June 2023 two more player left the club. Puerto Rican guard John Holland left as a free agent, and American center Hassan Martin terminated his contract in order to join Japanese side Shimane Susanoo Magic. Both of them were part of the club for one season, in which they won Basketball League of Serbia and Radivoj Korać Cup. At the end of July he joined Israeli side Hapoel Tel Aviv. On the same date Euroleague Basketball announced that Crvena zvezda will be receiving one year wild card for 2023–24 EuroLeague season.

The first signing for this season was announced also on 29 June 2023. It was Serbian international forward Dejan Davidovac who returned to the club after one year with Russian side CSKA Moscow. In his first spell with the club between 2017 and 2022 he won 3 Adriatic leagues, 4 Serbian leagues, 2 Serbian cups and Adriatic supercup.

On 1 July it was announced that Serbian power forward Luka Mitrović signed a new two-year contract with the club, with an option for third-year extension.

On 3 July, after his one-year contract expired, Ghanaian power forward Ben Bentil also left the club. Later on, at the start of August, he joined Japanese side Gunma Crane Thunders.

On 8 July Montenegrin international center Marko Simonović joined the club on a two-year deal. Previous two years he played for NBA team Chicago Bulls and their affiliate Windy City Bulls.

On 11 July Serbian international guard Miloš Teodosić joined the club on a one-year deal after his contract with Virtus Bologna expired. Teodosić is former EuroLeague and EuroCup champion, and winner of over 20 individual awards during his career including EuroLeague MVP, three times EuroLeague First Team, Serbian Player of the Year and EuroLeague 2010–20 All-Decade Team. He also won three silver medals with Serbia from the Summer Olympics, World Cup and EuroBasket and was captain of the national squad for fifteen years.

On 12 July Hungarian international winger Ádám Hanga joined the club on a two-year deal. He arrived from Spanish side Real Madrid with whom he won last season's Euroleague. He was also EuroLeague Best Defender in 2017 and represented Hungary on two EuroBaskets.

On 13 July Serbian forward Ognjen Dobrić left the club as a free agent and joined Italian side Virtus Bologna. He is the product of the club's youth academy and was part of the first squad for the last 7 seasons during which he won 15 trophies, multiple individual awards including being named Adriatic League Finals MVP in 2022 and became the twelfth best scorer in the club's history and the best scorer for the club in both European competitions and Adriatic league.

Another player left the club on the same day. Argentine guard Facundo Campazzo left the club as a free agent after spending with them second half of the last season in which he won Serbian League and Serbian cup.

On 14 July two new players joined the club. US-born Slovenian international center Mike Tobey joined the club from Spanish side Barcelona on a one-year contract. Second addition was Ukrainian-born Russian international bigman Joel Bolomboy who joined a club on a one-year contract from Greek side Olympiacos.

On 15 July Lithuanian forward Rokas Giedraitis joined the club from the Spanish side Baskonia. He signed a one-year contract with the club.

On 16 July American guard Shabazz Napier joined the club on a two-year contract from the Italian side Olimpia Milano.

On 17 July two more guards joined the club. Brazilian player Yago dos Santos arrived from German side Ratiopharm Ulm and signed a three-year contract with the club, while Serbian player Nikola Topić and a product of club's youth academy returned from a loan from Serbian side OKK Beograd and signed a four-year contract with the club. On the same date Serbian bigman Filip Petrušev left the club after his contract expired and joined NBA side Philadelphia 76ers after playing for them during the 2023 NBA Summer League.

On 18 July club announced that Serbian forward Stefan Lazarević signed a new three-year contract with the club.

On 27 July club announced that Serbian center and former NBA champion Ognjen Kuzmić signed a new two-year contract with the club.

On 28 July club announced that Serbian swingman and club's captain Branko Lazić extended his contract for one additional season. This will be his 13th season straight with the club.

On 29 July Montenegrin guard Nikola Ivanović left the club after two seasons in which he won Adriatic league, two Serbian leagues and Serbian cup. He joined Russian side Runa Basket Moscow.

On 7 August, Serbian point guard Nikola Topić, who previously signed a four-year contract with the club, left on a season-long loan to Mega MIS.

Club officially started their pre-season training camp on 27 August. Four players who arrived at the club this summer were not present due to them playing for their national teams on 2023 FIBA Basketball World Cup - Dejan Davidovac for Serbia, Marko Simonović for Montenegro, Mike Tobey for Slovenia and Yago dos Santos for Brazil.

On 3 September club announced that they mutually terminated contract with Serbian veteran center Miroslav Raduljica. He left the club after one season and joined Greek side Maroussi.

On 12 September Serbian veteran forward Nemanja Bjelica joined the club on a one-year contract. Bjelica, who is former Euroleague MVP and NBA Champion as well as silver medalist from FIBA World Cup and Eurobasket, arrived from the Turkish side Fenerbahçe. This will be his second spell at the Crvena zvezda, for whom he previously played between 2008 and 2010.

=== October ===
During the month club started this season run in Adriatic league with four wins and a defeat against their arch-rivals Partizan. This secured them the third place at the end of the month with 4–1 record.

In Euroleague club played five games. They started with win against ASVEL followed by four straight defeats including the one in Crvena Zvezda–Partizan basketball rivalry. This brought them to the 15th place in the league at the end of the month with a 1–4 record.

On 21 October club announced that they have parted ways with Montenegrin head coach Duško Ivanović after slow Euroleague start of one win and four defeats. He was the head coach of the club since November 2022, and during his tenure club won Serbian League and Serbian Cup titles. On the next day, the club hired Greek coach Ioannis Sfairopoulos as their new head coach.

=== November ===
In Adriatic league club won all four games they played during the November witch secured them first place at the end of the month with 8–1 record.

In Euroleague club played five games. They had a score of two wins and three defeats. This brought them to the 16th place in the league at the end of the month with a 3–7 record.

=== December ===
In Adriatic League club played 4 games during this month, winning all four of them. This secured them top of the table with the score of 13–1.

In EuroLeague club played 7 games, winning 3 and losing 4. This put them on the 15th position in the league with the score of 6–11.

On 18 December Crvena zvezda signed American center Freddie Gillespie who previously played for German side Bayern Munich. Gillespie signed contract with the club until the end of the season.

On 20 December American guard Shabazz Napier and club agreed on mutual termination of the contract after only six months in order to join his former club Olimpia Milano.

On 25 December Serbian former international center and NBA Champion Ognjen Kuzmić left the club after more than three years. This was his second spell at the club, with whom he won 11 titles. He joined FMP until the end of current season.

On 26 December Serbian guard Nikola Topić returned to the club after the six months loan at the Mega MIS.

=== January ===
In Adriatic League club played 4 games during this month, losing first game against Cedevita Olimpija and winning remaining three games including Eternal derby win against their arch rivals Partizan. This, again, secured them top of the table with the score of 16–2.

In EuroLeague club played 7 games, winning 4 and losing 3. This put them on the 12th position in the league with the score of 10–14.

On 3 January Montenegrin international center Marko Simonović left the club in order to join Turkish side Beşiktaş on a loan until the end of the season.

On 14 January club signed American combo guard Javonte Smart on a contract until the end of the season, with an option for a year long extension. First part of the season Smart spent in NBA G League with Delaware Blue Coats. This will be his first time playing outside of US.

On 23 January draw was held for this season's Radivoj Korać Cup. Crvena zvezda was drawn in quarter-finals against FMP.

On 30 January club announced that they signed contract extension with their Russian center Joel Bolomboy. New two years extension will keep him at the club until the summer of 2026. Bolomboy arrived at the club at the start of this season from Greek side Olympiacos.

=== February ===
In Adriatic League club played 2 games during this month, losing one and winning one. This secured them top of the table with the score of 17–3.

In EuroLeague club also played 2 games, losing both of them. This put them on the 16th position in the league with the score of 10–16.

This seasons Radivoj Korać Cup was played between 14 and 17 February. Crvena zvezda successfully defended their title after wins against FMP in quarterfinal, Čačak 94 Quantox in semifinal and Partizan Mozzart Bet in final. This was their 13th national cup title in history and 4th in a row.

On 7 February club signed American forward Trey Thompkins for the rest of the season. His last club was Zenit Saint Petersburg and was out of the contract since summer of 2023.

=== March ===
In Adriatic League, club played 4 games, losing one and winning three. Club suffered an unexpected loss to Mega MIS 83–89 at home. Crvena zvezda remained first in the table with the 20–4 record.

In Euroleague, club played 6 games, losing five and winning only one. They remained on 16th position with the 11–21 record.

=== April ===
In Adriatic League, club played 2 games in regular season, winning both of them and finishing regular season with the 22–4 record. In Playoffs, club faced SC Derby, winning both games and progressing to the semifinals.

In Euroleague, club played 2 games and lost both of them. They suffered their biggest loss in Euroleague ever by losing to Anadolu Efes 100–55 in Istanbul. They finished season on 16th position with 11–23 record.

=== May ===
In Adriatic League, club played 5 games, winning all of them. They won both games in semifinals against Mega MIS and progressed to the finals where they played against Partizan Mozzart Bet. They won the series convincingly 3–0, thus sweeping the arch rival.

In Basketball League of Serbia (KLS), club played 2 games in semifinals against FMP Meridian and won both games and reached the final where they played again against Partizan Mozzart Bet.

=== June ===
In Basketball League of Serbia (KLS), club played 2 games and won both of them in the finals against Partizan Mozzart Bet and won their 9th title of Serbian League.

== Players ==
=== Current roster ===
Note: Flags indicate national team eligibility at FIBA-sanctioned events. Players may hold other non-FIBA nationalities not displayed.

Crvena zvezda Meridianbet roster
Players
Coaches

Pos.	No.	Nat.	Name	Ht.	Wt.	Age
SF	2	(Serbia)	Lazarević, Stefan	2.00 m (6 ft 7 in)	100 kg (220 lb)	30 – 20 August 1996
G	4	(Serbia)	Teodosić, Miloš	1.96 m (6 ft 5 in)	90 kg (198 lb)	39 – 19 March 1987
F	7	(Serbia)	Davidovac, Dejan	2.03 m (6 ft 8 in)	95 kg (209 lb)	31 – 17 January 1995
F/C	9	(Serbia)	Mitrović, Luka	2.06 m (6 ft 9 in)	110 kg (243 lb)	33 – 30 March 1993
G/F	10	(Serbia)	Lazić, Branko (C)	1.95 m (6 ft 5 in)	91 kg (201 lb)	37 – 12 January 1989
F/C	21	(Russia)	Bolomboy, Joel	2.03 m (6 ft 8 in)	106 kg (234 lb)	32 – 28 January 1994
F/C	22	(Serbia)	Ilić, Dalibor	2.06 m (6 ft 9 in)	94 kg (207 lb)	26 – 4 March 2000
SG	26	(Serbia)	Nedović, Nemanja	1.91 m (6 ft 3 in)	87 kg (192 lb)	35 – 16 June 1991
SF	31	(Lithuania)	Giedraitis, Rokas	2.01 m (6 ft 7 in)	88 kg (194 lb)	34 – 16 August 1992
PG	99	(Brazil)	dos Santos, Yago	1.75 m (5 ft 9 in)	70 kg (154 lb)	27 – 9 March 1999

Head coach

- (Greece) Ioannis Sfairopoulos

Assistant coach(es)

- (Greece) Vassilis Geragotelis
- (Serbia) Tomislav Tomović

Strength & conditioning coach(es)

- (Serbia) Vladan Radonjić
- (Serbia) Igor Tomašević

Team manager

- (Serbia) Nebojša Ilić

Legend

- (C) Team captain
- Injured

- Roster
- Transactions
Updated: March 20, 2024

=== Players with multiple nationalities ===
- (Serbia) (Bosnia and Herzegovina) Dalibor Ilić
- (Russia) (Ukraine) Joel Bolomboy

=== Depth chart ===
Pos.	Starting 5	Bench 1	Bench 2
C	Joel Bolomboy	Luka Mitrović	Uroš Plavšić
PF	Filip Petrusev	Mike Daum	Dejan Davidovac
SF	Nikola Kalinić	Rokas Giedraitis	Ognjen Dobric
SG	Isaiah Canaan	Nemanja Nedović	Branko Lazić
PG	Codi Miller-McIntyre	Miloš Teodosić	Yago dos Santos

=== On loan ===
The following players have been on loan during the 2023–24 season and have professional contracts signed with the club.

KK Crvena zvezda players out on loan
Nat.	Player	Position	Team	On loan since
(Serbia)	Milutin Vujičić	PG	(Serbia) FMP	May 2021
(Serbia)	Nikola Manojlović	SG/SF	(Serbia) FMP	December 2021
(Serbia)	Filip Branković	C	(Serbia) SPD Radnički	September 2022
(Serbia)	Lazar Vasić	PG	(Serbia) Vršac	September 2022
(Serbia)	Filip Radaković	SG/SF	(Serbia) Mladost MaxBet	September 2022
(Serbia)	Marko Mihailović	SG	(Serbia) Tamiš	September 2022
(Montenegro)	Marko Simonović	F/C	(Turkey) Beşiktaş	January 2024

=== Transactions ===
==== Players In ====
No.	Pos.	Nat.	Name	Age	Moving from		Type	Ends	Date	Source
7	SF	(Serbia)	Dejan Davidovac	31	CSKA Moscow	(Russia)	End of contract	2026	29 June 2023	
11	F/C	(Montenegro)	Marko Simonović	26	Chicago Bulls	(United States)	Waived	2025	8 July 2023	
4	G	(Serbia)	Miloš Teodosić	39	Virtus Bologna	(Italy)	End of contract	2024	11 July 2023	
5	SF	(Hungary)	Ádám Hanga	37	Real Madrid	(Spain)	End of contract	2025	12 July 2023	
18	C	(Slovenia) (United States)	Mike Tobey	31	Barcelona	(Spain)	End of contract	2024	14 July 2023	
21	F/C	(Russia) (Ukraine)	Joel Bolomboy	32	Olympiacos	(Greece)	End of contract	2024	14 July 2023	
31	SF	(Lithuania)	Rokas Giedraitis	34	Baskonia	(Spain)	End of contract	2024	15 July 2023	
13	PG	(United States) (Puerto Rico)	Shabazz Napier	35	Olimpia Milano	(Italy)	End of contract	2025	16 July 2023	
99	PG	(Brazil)	Yago dos Santos	27	Ratiopharm Ulm	(Germany)	Mutual termination	2026	17 July 2023	
44	PG	(Serbia)	Nikola Topić	21	OKK Beograd	(Serbia)	Loan return	2027	17 July 2023	
44	F	(Serbia)	Nemanja Bjelica	38	Fenerbahçe	(Turkey)	Waived	2024	12 September 2023	
3	C	(Montenegro)	Branislav Vuksanović	23	Budućnost VOLI	(Montenegro)	Loan return	2027	17 October 2023	
33	C	(United States)	Freddie Gillespie	29	Bayern Munich	(Germany)	Mutual termination	2024	18 December 2023	
44	PG	(Serbia)	Nikola Topić	21	Mega MIS	(Serbia)	Loan return	2027	26 December 2023	
1	PG	(United States)	Javonte Smart	27	Delaware Blue Coats	(United States)	Mutual termination	2024	14 January 2024	
6	PF	(United States)	Trey Thompkins	36	BC Zenit Saint Petersburg	(Russia)	End of contract	2024	7 February 2024	

==== Players Out ====
No.	Pos.	Nat.	Name	Age	Moving to		Type	Date	Source
27	G	(Serbia)	Stefan Marković	38	Retired		End of contract	23 June 2023	
2	G	(Argentina)	Luca Vildoza	31	Panathinaikos	(Greece)	Mutual termination	26 June 2023	
1	SF	(Puerto Rico)	John Holland	37	Hapoel Tel Aviv	(Israel)	End of contract	29 June 2023	
12	F/C	(United States)	Hassan Martin	30	Shimane Susanoo Magic	(Japan)	Mutual termination	29 June 2023	
50	F/C	(Ghana)	Ben Bentil	31	Gunma Crane Thunders	(Japan)	End of contract	3 July 2023	
77	PF	(Serbia)	Nemanja Popović	24	Mega MIS	(Serbia)	Mutual termination	10 July 2023	
13	SF	(Serbia)	Ognjen Dobrić	31	Virtus Bologna	(Italy)	End of contract	13 July 2023	
7	PG	(Argentina)	Facundo Campazzo	35	Real Madrid	(Spain)	End of contract	13 July 2023	
33	F/C	(Serbia)	Filip Petrušev	26	Philadelphia 76ers	(United States)	End of contract	17 July 2023	
20	PG	(Montenegro)	Nikola Ivanović	32	Runa Basket Moscow	(Russia)	End of contract	29 July 2023	
44	PG	(Serbia)	Nikola Topić	21	Mega MIS	(Serbia)	Loan	7 August 2023	
–	PF	(Serbia)	Lazar Đoković	22	Xavier Musketeers	(United States)	Mutual termination	21 August 2023	
15	C	(Serbia)	Miroslav Raduljica	38	Maroussi	(Greece)	Mutual termination	4 September 2023	
13	PG	(United States) (Puerto Rico)	Shabazz Napier	35	Olimpia Milano	(Italy)	Mutual termination	20 December 2023	
32	C	(Serbia)	Ognjen Kuzmić	36	FMP	(Serbia)	Mutual termination	25 December 2023	
11	F/C	(Montenegro)	Marko Simonović	26	Beşiktaş	(Turkey)	Loan	3 January 2024	

== Club ==
=== Technical staff ===
The following is the technical staff of Crvena zvezda for the 2022–23 season.

Position	Staff member
General Manager	(Serbia) Nemanja Vasiljević
Team Manager	(Serbia) Nebojša Ilić
Head Coach	(Greece) Ioannis Sfairopoulos
Assistant Coaches	(Greece) Vassilis Geragotelis
Assistant Coaches	(Serbia) Nenad Jakovljević
Assistant Coaches	(Serbia) Tomislav Tomović
Conditioning Coaches	(Serbia) Vladan Radonjić
Conditioning Coaches	(Serbia) Igor Tomašević
Physiotherapists	(Serbia) Milorad Ćirić
Physiotherapists	(Serbia) Todor Galić
Physiotherapists	(Serbia) Miljan Nićiforović
Team physicians	(Serbia) Nebojša Mitrović
Team physicians	(Serbia) Boris Gluščević

=== Uniform ===
The following is a list of corporate sponsorship patches on a uniform of Crvena zvezda and uniform designs for the 2023–24 season.

- Supplier: Adidas
- Main sponsors: Meridian, mts
- Left shoulder sponsor: Dunav osiguranje
- Back sponsors: Soccerbet (above number), Idea (below number)
- Shorts sponsor (right leg): Carnex (big), Banka Poštanska štedionica (small)

Home	Away	Third

== Pre-season and friendlies ==
Crvena zvezda is scheduled to play nine pre-season games. The first three games will be played in Serbia. Then, they will participated at three tournaments - in Cagliari, Italy, from 9 to 10 September 2023, Munich, Germany, from 16 to 17 September 2023 and Nicosia, Cyprus, from 22 to 23 September 2023.

Win Loss

31 August 2023 1	Crvena zvezda Meridianbet (Serbia)	94–58	(Serbia) Spartak Office Shoes	Stara Pazova
	Pts: Nedović 25	Boxscore

3 September 2023 2	Crvena zvezda Meridianbet (Serbia)	84–50	(Serbia) Dynamic Balkan Bet	Belgrade
	Pts: Giedraitis 20; Rebs: Kuzmić 7 Asts: Nedović 6	Boxscore		Arena: Aleksandar Nikolić Hall

4 September 2023 3	Crvena zvezda Meridianbet (Serbia)	90–73	(Serbia) Borac Mozzart	Belgrade
	Pts: Nedović 25; Asts: Mitrović 7	Boxscore		Arena: Aleksandar Nikolić Hall

City of Cagliari tournament

9 September 2023 SF	Dinamo Sassari (Italy)	76–71	(Serbia) Crvena zvezda Meridianbet	Cagliari
20:30	Scoring by quarter: 21–16, 16–12, 17–21, 22–22
	Pts: Treier 19	Boxscore	Pts: Hanga 15	Arena: PalaRockefeller

10 September 2023 3rd place game	Crvena zvezda Meridianbet (Serbia)	77–74	(France) LDLC ASVEL	Cagliari
18:00
	Pts: Napier 20	Boxscore		Arena: PalaRockefeller

Magentasport Cup

16 September 2023 SF	Alba Berlin (Germany)	56–74	(Serbia) Crvena zvezda Meridianbet	Munich
17:00
		Boxscore	Pts: Mitrović 16; Rebs: Mitrović 6 Asts: Teodosić 7	Arena: BMW Park

17 September 2023 F	Bayern Munich (Germany)	84–82	(Serbia) Crvena zvezda Meridianbet	Munich
18:00	Scoring by quarter: 17–25, 18–21, 20–14, 29–22
		Boxscore	Pts: Hanga 15; Rebs: Bolomboy 6 Asts: Teodosić 8	Arena: BMW Park

OPAP Basketball Tournament

22 September 2023 SF	Crvena zvezda Meridianbet (Serbia)	109–112	(Israel) Maccabi Playtika Tel Aviv	Nicosia
18:00
	Pts: Mitrović, Nedović 23; Rebs: Mitrović, Simonović 7 Asts: dos Santos 8	Boxscore

23 September 2023 3rd place game	Crvena zvezda Meridianbet (Serbia)	84–85	(Lithuania) Žalgiris	Nicosia
15:45
	Pts: Giedraitis 19	Boxscore	Pts: Ulanovas 16

== Competitions ==
=== Overall ===
Competition	Started round	Final position / round	First match	Last match
Adriatic League	Matchday 1	Champions	30 September 2023	19 May 2024
EuroLeague	Matchday 1	16th	5 October 2023	11 April 2024
Serbian League	—	Champions	24 May 2024	5 June 2024
Radivoj Korać Cup	Quarterfinals	Champions	14 February 2024	17 February 2024
Adriatic Supercup	—N/a	Withdrew	DNP	

Updated to match played 17 February 2024
Source: Competitions

=== Overview ===
Competition	Record							
Competition	Pld	W	D	L	PF	PA	PD	Win %
Adriatic League	33	29	0	4	2,927	2,408	+519	87.88
EuroLeague	34	11	0	23	2,764	2,816	−52	32.35
Radivoj Korać Cup	3	3	0	0	252	206	+46	100.00
Total	70	43	0	27	5,943	5,430	+513	61.43

Last updated: 17 February 2024
Source: Competitions

=== Adriatic League ===
==== Regular season ====
Pos	Team	Pld	W	L	PF	PA	PD	Pts	Qualification or relegation
1	(Basketball Federation of Serbia) Crvena zvezda Meridianbet	26	22	4	2310	1877	+433	48	Advance to the Playoffs
2	(Basketball Federation of Serbia) Partizan Mozzart Bet	26	20	6	2423	1966	+457	46	Advance to the Playoffs
3	(Basketball Federation of Montenegro) Budućnost VOLI	26	19	7	2206	2002	+204	45	Advance to the Playoffs
4	(Basketball Federation of Serbia) Mega MIS	26	16	10	2246	2140	+106	42	Advance to the Playoffs
5	(Basketball Federation of Slovenia) Cedevita Olimpija	26	16	10	2235	2184	+51	42	Advance to the Playoffs

Source: ABA League

==== Results summary ====
Overall						Home					Away				
Pld	W	L	PF	PA	PD	W	L	PF	PA	PD	W	L	PF	PA	PD
26	22	4	2310	1877	+433	12	1	1182	873	+309	10	3	1128	1004	+124

Last updated: 11 February 2024.
Source: Competitive matches

==== Results by round ====
Round	1	2	3	4	5	6	7	8	9	10	11	12	13	14	15	16	17	18	19	20	21	22	23	24	25	26
Ground	A	H	A	A	A	H	A	H	A	H	A	A	H	H	A	H	H	H	A	H	A	H	A	H	H	A
Result	W	W	W	W	L	W	W	W	W	W	W	W	W	W	L	W	W	W	L	W	W	W	W	L	W	W
Position	3	2	3	1	3	2	2	1	1	1	1	1	1	1	1	1	1	1	1	1	1	1	1	1	1	1

Last updated: 11 February 2024.
Source: Competitive matches
Ground: A = Away; H = Home; R = Rest. Result: L = Loss; W = Win; R = Rest; P = Postponed.

Win Loss

==== Matches ====
Note: All times are CET (UTC+1).

30 September 2023 1	Igokea m:tel (Basketball Federation of Bosnia and Herzegovina)	63–81	(Basketball Federation of Serbia) Crvena Zvezda Meridianbet	Laktaši
20:00	Scoring by quarter: 17-20, 15-20, 13-26, 18-15
	Pts: Tanasković 16; Rebs: Tanasković 9 Asts: Gordić 4 PIR: Tanasković 18	Boxscore	Pts: Tobey 19; Rebs: Tobey 8 Asts: Teodosić 7 PIR: Tobey 24	Arena: Laktaši Sports Hall; Attendance: 3,000; Referees: Damir Javor, Miloš Koljenšić, Mario Majkić

8 October 2023 2	Crvena zvezda Meridianbet (Basketball Federation of Serbia)	94–51	(Basketball Federation of Slovenia) Cedevita Olimpija	Belgrade
19:30	Scoring by quarter: 19-11, 31-14, 27-8, 17-18
	Pts: Nedović 17; Rebs: Tobey 8 Asts: Hanga 7 PIR: Napier 20	Boxscore	Pts: Sow 19; Rebs: Jones 10; Asts: Radičević 2 PIR: Sow 19	Arena: Štark Arena; Attendance: 10,326; Referees: Tomislav Hordov, Josip Radojković, Luka Kardum

15 October 2023 3	Borac Mozzart (Basketball Federation of Serbia)	87–93	(Basketball Federation of Serbia) Crvena Zvezda Meridianbet	Čačak
18:00	Scoring by quarter: 20-24, 15-19, 20-22, 32-28
	Pts: Segu 23; Rebs: Franklin 6 Asts: Uskoković 5 PIR: Segu 23	Boxscore	Pts: Napier 18; Rebs: Bolomboy, Ilić 7 Asts: Teodosić 8 PIR: Giedraitis 21	Arena: Borac Hall; Attendance: 2,500; Referees: Ilija Belošević, Milivoje Jovčić, Ernad Karović

23 October 2023 4	FMP Meridian (Basketball Federation of Serbia)	72–83	(Basketball Federation of Serbia) Crvena Zvezda Meridianbet	Belgrade
18:00	Scoring by quarter: 16–21, 17–20, 23–20, 16–22
	Pts: Walker 17; Rebs: Subotić 5 Asts: Luke 5 PIR: Stepanović 17	Boxscore	Pts: Teodosić 11; Rebs: Hanga 6 Asts: Teodosić 10; PIR: Napier 19	Arena: Železnik Hall; Attendance: 1,832; Referees: Igor Dragojević, Aleksandar Milojević, Krešimir Katić

30 October 2023 5	Partizan Mozzart Bet (Basketball Federation of Serbia)	98–87	(Basketball Federation of Serbia) Crvena Zvezda Meridianbet	Belgrade
20:00	Scoring by quarter: 17–25, 30–11, 25–27, 26–24
	Pts: Kaminsky 22; Rebs: Three players 4 Asts: Dozier 8 PIR: Kaminsky 27	Boxscore	Pts: Napier 23; Rebs: Giedraitis 6 Asts: Napier 8 PIR: Mitrović, Napier 20	Arena: Štark Arena; Attendance: 20,007; Referees: Matej Boltauzer, Tomislav Hordov, Uroš Nikolić

5 November 2023 6	Crvena zvezda Meridianbet (Basketball Federation of Serbia)	95–86	(Basketball Federation of Montenegro) Budućnost VOLI	Belgrade
19:00	Scoring by quarter: 21-18, 32-24, 16-21, 26-23
	Pts: Tobey 23; Rebs: Tobey 6 Asts: Teodosić 6 PIR: Tobey 26	Boxscore	Pts: Jones, Wright IV 17; Rebs: Makoundou 6 Asts: Wright IV 6 PIR: Williams 18	Arena: Štark Arena; Attendance: 10,730; Referees: Damir Javor, Sašo Petek, Luka Kardum

12 November 2023 7	Zadar (Croatian Basketball Federation)	74–81	(Basketball Federation of Serbia) Crvena Zvezda Meridianbet	Zadar
17:00	Scoring by quarter: 24-23, 19-22, 11-25, 20-11
	Pts: Božić 18; Rebs: Božić 10; Asts: Mazalin, Božić 5 PIR: Božić 29	Boxscore	Pts: Giedraitis 19; Rebs: Tobey 7 Asts: Nedović 6 PIR: Giedraitis 20	Arena: Krešimir Ćosić Hall; Attendance: 8,000; Referees: Saša Pukl, Mario Majkić, Tomislav Stapić

20 November 2023 8	Crvena zvezda Meridianbet (Basketball Federation of Serbia)	95–75	(Basketball Federation of Montenegro) Mornar Barsko zlato	Belgrade
20:00	Scoring by quarter: 29-17, 23-22, 26-21, 17-15
	Pts: Tobey 16; Rebs: Ilić 8 Asts: Nedović 9 PIR: Tobey 22	Boxscore	Pts: Waller 14; Rebs: Gavrilović 5 Asts: Murray Jr. 4 PIR: Gavrilović 16	Arena: Aleksandar Nikolić Hall; Attendance: 4,142; Referees: Igor Dragojević, Radoš Savović, Miloš Hadžić

27 November 2023 9	Krka (Basketball Federation of Slovenia)	67–90	(Basketball Federation of Serbia) Crvena Zvezda Meridianbet	Novo Mesto
17:00	Scoring by quarter: 13-26, 12-15, 17-21, 25-28
	Pts: Stergar 15; Rebs: Radovanović 8 Asts: Špan 4 PIR: Cousins 16	Boxscore	Pts: Tobey 16; Rebs: Simonović, Bolomboy 6 Asts: Mitrović 7 PIR: Tobey 19	Arena: Leon Štukelj Hall; Attendance: 1,450; Referees: Tomislav Hordov, Krunoslav Peić, Vojislav Lepetić

3 December 2023 10	Crvena zvezda Meridianbet (Basketball Federation of Serbia)	84–56	(Croatian Basketball Federation) Cibona	Belgrade
19:00	Scoring by quarter: 21-16, 25-13, 15-14, 23-13
	Pts: Tobey 23; Rebs: Simonović, Tobey 5 Asts: Napier 7 PIR: Tobey 26	Boxscore	Pts: Proleta 13; Rebs: Perasović 5 Asts: Stein 4 PIR: Perasović 11	Arena: Štark Arena; Attendance: 6,843; Referees: Ilija Belošević, Tomislav Vovk, Aleksandar Davidov

11 December 2023 11	Mega MIS (Basketball Federation of Serbia)	88–98	(Basketball Federation of Serbia) Crvena zvezda Meridianbet	Belgrade
18:00	Scoring by quarter: 27-22, 13-26, 30-20, 18-30
	Pts: Topić 21; Rebs: Plavšić 11; Asts: İlyasoğlu 6 PIR: Topić 23	Boxscore	Pts: Nedović 23; Rebs: Simonović, Nedović 6 Asts: Nedović 6 PIR: Nedović 32	Arena: Ranko Žeravica Sports Hall; Attendance: 3,000; Referees: Saša Pukl, Igor Dragojević, Miloš Koljenšić

17 December 2023 12	SC Derby (Basketball Federation of Montenegro)	77–91	(Basketball Federation of Serbia) Crvena zvezda Meridianbet	Podgorica
17:00	Scoring by quarter: 21-21, 20-25, 24-17, 12-28
	Pts: Drobnjak 17; Rebs: Kamenjaš 7 Asts: Drobnjak 4 PIR: Drobnjak 20	Boxscore	Pts: Mitrović 20; Rebs: Mitrović 7 Asts: Teodosić 9 PIR: Mitrović 25	Arena: Morača Sports Center; Attendance: 1,450; Referees: Milivoje Jovčić, Luka Kardum, Dragan Porobić

24 December 2023 13	Crvena zvezda Meridianbet (Basketball Federation of Serbia)	89–67	(Croatian Basketball Federation) Split	Belgrade
19:00	Scoring by quarter: 21-16, 26-18, 24-17, 18-16
	Pts: Tobey 24; Rebs: Mitrović, Tobey 6 Asts: Nedović 6 PIR: Tobey 29	Boxscore	Pts: Shorter 17; Rebs: Funderburk Jr. 5 Asts: Perković 4 PIR: Shorter 21	Arena: Železnik Hall; Attendance: 3,256; Referees: Uroš Nikolić, Marko Juras, Vladimir Tomić

30 December 2023 14	Crvena zvezda Meridianbet (Basketball Federation of Serbia)	80–48	(Basketball Federation of Bosnia and Herzegovina) Igokea	Belgrade
20:00	Scoring by quarter: 31-13, 16-16, 17-15, 16-4
	Pts: Tobey 13; Rebs: Tobey 12; Asts: dos Santos, Topić 5 PIR: Tobey 22	Boxscore	Pts: Nakić 12; Rebs: Carmichael 9 Asts: Atić 5 PIR: Carmichael 16	Arena: Aleksandar Nikolić Hall; Attendance: 4,320; Referees: Josip Radojković, Denis Hadžić, Marko Mustapić

6 January 2024 15	Cedevita Olimpija (Basketball Federation of Slovenia)	96–86	(Basketball Federation of Serbia) Crvena zvezda Meridianbet	Ljubljana
17:00	Scoring by quarter: 23–21, 26–16, 21–28, 26–21
	Pts: Matković 23; Rebs: Blažič 8 Asts: Cobbs 8 PIR: Matković 31	Boxscore	Pts: dos Santos, Nedović 24; Rebs: Tobey 8 Asts: dos Santos 4 PIR: dos Santos 29	Arena: Tivoli Hall; Attendance: 4,087; Referees: Ilija Belošević, Sašo Petek, Luka Kardum

14 January 2024 16	Crvena zvezda Meridianbet (Basketball Federation of Serbia)	90–74	(Basketball Federation of Serbia) Borac Mozzart	Belgrade
19:30	Scoring by quarter: 35–18, 16–26, 22–18, 17–12
	Pts: dos Santos 24; Rebs: dos Santos 7 Asts: dos Santos 7 PIR: dos Santos 31	Boxscore	Pts: Segu 20; Rebs: Birts 8 Asts: Uskoković 4 PIR: Birts 23	Arena: Štark Arena; Attendance: 6,597; Referees: Milivoje Jovčić, Ivan Stefanović, Stefan Ćalić

21 January 2024 17	Crvena zvezda Meridianbet (Basketball Federation of Serbia)	87–54	(Basketball Federation of Serbia) FMP	Belgrade
18:00	Scoring by quarter: 26-13, 20-19, 18-14, 23-8
	Pts: Lazić, Yago 17; Rebs: Smart 6 Asts: Yago 14; PIR: Yago 30	Boxscore	Pts: Subotić 14; Rebs: four players 3 Asts: Rebec, Subotić 3 PIR: Subotić 16	Arena: Štark Arena; Attendance: 3,894; Referees: Ilija Belošević, Miloš Hadžić, Vladimir Vesković

28 January 2024 18	Crvena zvezda Meridianbet (Basketball Federation of Serbia)	88–86	(Basketball Federation of Serbia) Partizan Mozzart Bet	Belgrade
19:00	Scoring by quarter: 28-15, 27-23, 17-18, 16-30
	Pts: Hanga 15; Rebs: Bolomboy 13; Asts: Teodosić 5 PIR: Bolomboy 24	Boxscore	Pts: Nunnally 19; Rebs: Leday 6 Asts: Nunnally, Avramović, Dozier 4 PIR: Kaminsky 25	Arena: Štark Arena; Attendance: 18,796; Referees: Saša Pukl, Uroš Obrknežević, Josip Radojković

5 February 2024 19	Budućnost VOLI (Basketball Federation of Montenegro)	84–62	(Basketball Federation of Serbia) Crvena zvezda Meridianbet	Podgorica
17:00	Scoring by quarter: 22-18, 24-18, 13-15, 25-11
	Pts: Ferrell 18; Rebs: Tanasković, Kamenjaš 5 Asts: Ferrell, Wright IV 4 PIR: Ferrell 19	Boxscore	Pts: Mitrović 16; Rebs: Mitrović 6 Asts: Teodosić 4 PIR: Mitrović 20	Arena: Morača Sports Center; Attendance: 4,100; Referees: Damir Javor, Sašo Petek, Bojan Kruljac

11 February 2024 20	Crvena zvezda Meridianbet (Basketball Federation of Serbia)	93–54	(Croatian Basketball Federation) Zadar	Belgrade
19:00	Scoring by quarter: 31-12, 22-10, 20-18, 20-14
	Pts: Smart 15; Rebs: Mitrović 8 Asts: dos Santos 6 PIR: Smart, dos Santos 17	Boxscore	Pts: Božić 16; Rebs: Žganec, Božić 7 Asts: Božić 4 PIR: Božić 22	Arena: Štark Arena; Attendance: 3,846; Referees: Tomislav Hordov, Milan Nedović, Aleksandar Milojević

3 March 2023 21	Mornar Barsko zlato (Basketball Federation of Montenegro)	66–102	(Basketball Federation of Serbia) Crvena zvezda Meridianbet	Bar
21:00	Scoring by quarter: 23-21, 12-26, 14-31, 16-24
	Pts: Waller 14; Rebs: Weathers 6 Asts: Lewis 4 PIR: Gavrilović 11	Boxscore	Pts: Smart 16; Rebs: Tobey 9 Asts: dos Santos 7 PIR: Mitrović 26	Arena: Topolica Sport Hall; Attendance: 1,500; Referees: Tomislav Hordov, Nermin Nikšić, Ernad Karović

10 March 2024 22	Crvena zvezda Meridianbet (Serbia)	110–57	(Slovenia) Krka	Belgrade
19:00	Scoring by quarter: 31-11, 25-16, 25-17, 29-13
	Pts: Smart 24; Rebs: Gillespie 9 Asts: dos Santos 12; PIR: dos Santos 40	Boxscore	Pts: Cerkvenik, Macura 9 Rebs: Radovanović 5 Asts: Špan 8 PIR: Cerkvenik 11	Arena: Aleksandar Nikolić Hall; Attendance: 2,743; Referees: Matej Boltauzer, Tomislav Stapić, Nikola Jakimovski

17 March 2024 23	Cibona (Croatian Basketball Federation)	59–82	(Basketball Federation of Serbia) Crvena zvezda Meridianbet	Zagreb
18:00	Scoring by quarter: 14-21, 16-21, 20-20, 9-20
	Pts: Aranitović 16; Rebs: Aranitović 8 Asts: Radovčić 6 PIR: Aranitović 18	Boxscore	Pts: Nedović 16; Rebs: Bolomboy 9 Asts: Hanga 6 PIR: Nedović 20	Arena: Dražen Petrović Basketball Hall; Attendance: 3520; Referees: Uroš Obrknežević, Denis Hadžić, Gordan Terlević

25 March 2024 24	Crvena zvezda Meridianbet (Serbia)	83–89	Mega MIS (Basketball Federation of Serbia)	Belgrade
20:00	Scoring by quarter: 18-24, 30-17, 21-22, 14-26
	Pts: Hanga 22; Rebs: Mitrović 6 Asts: Nedović 7 PIR: Hanga 19	Boxscore	Pts: Miljenović 18; Rebs: Plavšić 7 Asts: Đurišić 4 PIR: Plavšić 20	Arena: Štark Arena; Attendance: 3,407; Referees: Milan Nedović, Mario Majkić, Nermin Nikšić

1 April 2024 25	Crvena zvezda Meridianbet (Serbia)	94–76	SC Derby (Basketball Federation of Montenegro)	Belgrade
18:00	Scoring by quarter: 30-18, 17-16, 27-21, 20-21
	Pts: Nedović 16; Rebs: Mitrović 6 Asts: Nedović 8 PIR: Hanga 19	Boxscore	Pts: Hadžibegović 15; Rebs: Mirković 6 Asts: Drežnjak 5 PIR: Hadžibegović 20	Arena: Štark Arena; Attendance: 2,104; Referees: Matej Boltauzer, Tomislav Stapić, Nikola Jakimovski

7 April 2024 26	(Croatia) Split	73–92	Crvena zvezda Meridianbet (Serbia)	Split
18:00	Scoring by quarter: 19-25, 18-24, 19-17, 17-26
	Pts: Sullivan 21; Rebs: Sullivan 8 Asts: Kučić 8 PIR: Sullivan 24	Boxscore	Pts: Nedović 19; Rebs: Mitrović 10; Asts: Hanga 7 PIR: Nedović 20	Arena: Mala dvorana KK Split; Attendance: 1,500; Referees: Damir Javor, Nermin Nikšić, Edo Javor

=== Quarterfinals ===
15 April 2024	Crvena zvezda Meridianbet (Serbia)	83–81	SC Derby (Basketball Federation of Montenegro)	Belgrade
18:00	Scoring by quarter: 15-21, 15-19, 19-24, 34-17
	Pts: Teodosić 17; Rebs: Bolomboy 9 Asts: Teodosić 8 PIR: Mitrović 18	Boxscore	Pts: Ivišić 14; Rebs: Ivišić 5 Asts: Kapusta 4 PIR: Ivišić 17	Arena: Štark Arena; Attendance: 3,324; Referees: Milan Nedović, Luka Kardum, Marko Mustapić

22 April 2024	SC Derby (Basketball Federation of Montenegro)	77–92	Crvena zvezda Meridianbet (Serbia)	Podgorica
18:30	Scoring by quarter: 12-29, 22-28, 20-21, 23-14
	Pts: Drežnjak 19; Rebs: Mirković 6 Asts: Drežnjak 4 PIR: Drežnjak 22	Boxscore	Pts: Dos Santos 17; Rebs: three players Asts: Dos Santos, Bolomboy 4 PIR: Dos Santos 18	Arena: Sportski centar Morača; Attendance: 1,245; Referees: Saša Pukl, Sašo Petek, Josip Radojković

=== Semifinals ===
5 May 2024	Crvena zvezda Meridianbet (Serbia)	103–73	Mega MIS (Basketball Federation of Serbia)	Belgrade
19:00	Scoring by quarter: 27-20, 25-13, 26-22, 26-18
	Pts: Giedraitis, Nedović 13; Rebs: Bolomboy 5 Asts: Topić 6 PIR: four players 15	Boxscore	Pts: Đurišić 26; Rebs: Jelavić, Jović 5 Asts: Đurišić 5 PIR: Đurišić 31	Arena: Hala Aleksandar Nikolić; Attendance: 6,215; Referees: Tomislav Hordov, Dragan Porobić, Stefan Ćalić

7 May 2024	Mega MIS (Basketball Federation of Serbia)	69–94	Crvena zvezda Meridianbet (Serbia)	Belgrade
20:00	Scoring by quarter: 26-19, 11-28, 16-29, 16-18
	Pts: Marković, Milijašević 13; Rebs: Marković 7 Asts: İlyasoğlu 5 PIR: Marković 17	Boxscore	Pts: Giedraitis 20; Rebs: Mitrović 8 Asts: Dos Santos 7 PIR: Gillespie 24	Arena: Hala sportova Ranko Žeravica; Attendance: 1,500; Referees: Miloš Koljenšić, Igor Dragojević, Denis Hadžić

=== Finals ===
13 May 2024	Crvena zvezda Meridianbet (Basketball Federation of Serbia)	85–82	(Basketball Federation of Serbia) Partizan Mozzart Bet	Belgrade
20:30	Scoring by quarter: 17-20, 22-19, 25-22, 21-21
	Pts: Dos Santos 18; Rebs: Davidovac 7 Asts: Dos Santos 6 PIR: Dos Santos 21	Boxscore	Pts: Nunnally 27; Rebs: Leday 8 Asts: Smith 3 PIR: Nunnally 33	Arena: Aleksandar Nikolić Hall; Attendance: 7,463; Referees: Saša Pukl, Milivoje Jovčić, Luka Kardum

15 May 2024	Crvena zvezda Meridianbet (Basketball Federation of Serbia)	80–73	(Basketball Federation of Serbia) Partizan Mozzart Bet	Belgrade
19:30	Scoring by quarter: 17-19, 21-19, 23-19, 19-16
	Pts: Nedović 21; Rebs: Dos Santos 5 Asts: Teodosić 7 PIR: Nedović 20	Boxscore	Pts: Smith 12; Rebs: Nunnally, Caboclo 6 Asts: Dozier 3 PIR: Avramović 13	Arena: Aleksandar Nikolić Hall; Attendance: 7,867; Referees: Damir Javor, Uroš Obrknežević, Miloš Koljenšić

19 May 2024	Partizan Mozzart Bet (Basketball Federation of Serbia)	76–82	(Basketball Federation of Serbia) Crvena Zvezda Meridianbet	Belgrade
20:30	Scoring by quarter: 18-20, 20–22, 14–17, 24–23
	Pts: Avramović 17; Rebs: Dozier 6 Asts: Dozier 6 PIR: Dozier, Avramović 17	Boxscore	Pts: Giedraitis, Mitrović 12; Rebs: Mitrović 8 Asts: Teodosić 6 PIR: Mitrović, 23	Arena: Štark Arena; Attendance: 19,670; Referees: Uroš Nikolić, Milan Nedović, Josip Radojković

== Serbian Super League ==
Win Loss

=== Semifinals ===
Win Loss

24 May 2024 Semifinals 1	Crvena zvezda Meridianbet	97–87 (Series: 1-0)	FMP Meridian	Belgrade
20:30	Scoring by quarter: 27-13, 18-29, 25-23, 27-22
	Pts: Dos Santos 25; Rebs: Mitrović 10; Asts: Teodosić 7 PIR: Dos Santos 32	Boxscore	Pts: Rebec 16; Rebs: Kuzmić 10; Asts: Rebec 8 PIR: Rebec 20	Arena: Aleksandar Nikolić Hall; Attendance: 3,892; Referees: Uroš Obrknežević, Nemanja Vlahović, Žarko Stanković

27 May 2024 Semifinals 2	FMP Meridian	75–98 (Series: 0–2)	Crvena zvezda Meridianbet	Belgrade
18:00	Scoring by quarter: 13-24, 17-26, 28-22, 17-26
	Pts: Novak 26; Rebs: Kuzmić 8 Asts: Rebec 7 PIR: Novak 24	Boxscore	Pts: Dos Santos 16; Rebs: Ilić, Thompkins 6 Asts: Teodosić 9 PIR: Mitrović 24	Arena: Železnik Hall; Attendance: 1,428; Referees: Vladimir Jevtović, Vladimir Vesković, Radoš Arsenijević

=== Final ===
3 June 2024 G1	Crvena zvezda Meridianbet	89–88	Partizan Mozzart Bet	Belgrade
20:00	Scoring by quarter: 31–24, 20–28, 26–21, 12–15
Arena Sport	Pts: Davidovac 23; Rebs: Davidovac 9 Asts: dos Santos 7 PIR: Davidovac 34	Boxscore	Pts: Avramović 20; Rebs: Avramović, LeDay 6 Asts: Avramović 6 PIR: Avramović 29	Arena: Aleksandar Nikolić Hall; Attendance: 6,135; Referees: Milivoje Jovčić, Uroš Obrknežević, Vladimir Jevtović

5 June 2024 G2	Partizan Mozzart Bet	0–20	Crvena zvezda Meridianbet	Belgrade
20:00	Scoring by quarter: 24-22, 24-21, 9-2 (forfeited), (forfeited)
Arena Sport		Boxscore		Arena: Štark Arena; Attendance: 12,184; Referees: Uroš Nikolić, Marko Juras, Stefan Ćalić
Note: The match was stopped at 57:45 for Partizan. By the decision of KLS, the match was registered with a score of 0:20.

=== EuroLeague ===
==== Regular season ====
Pos	Team	Pld	W	L	PF	PA	PD
14	(Lithuanian Basketball Federation) Žalgiris	34	14	20	2694	2692	+2
15	(German Basketball Federation) Bayern Munich	34	13	21	2604	2724	−120
16	(Basketball Federation of Serbia) Crvena zvezda Meridianbet	34	11	23	2764	2816	−52
17	(French Federation of Basketball) LDLC ASVEL	34	9	25	2646	2859	−213
18	(German Basketball Federation) ALBA Berlin	34	5	29	2591	2944	−353

Source: EuroLeague
Rules for classification: All points scored in extra period(s) were not counted in the standings, nor for any tie-break situation.

==== Results summary ====
Overall						Home					Away				
Pld	W	L	PF	PA	PD	W	L	PF	PA	PD	W	L	PF	PA	PD
34	11	23	2764	2816	−52	8	9	1405	1344	+61	3	14	1359	1472	−113

Last updated: 9 February 2024.
Source: Competitive matches

==== Results by round ====
Round	1	2	3	4	5	6	7	8	9	10	11	12	13	14	15	16	17	18	19	20	21	22	23	24	25	26	27	28	29	30	31	32	33	34
Ground	H	A	H	A	A	H	A	H	A	H	H	A	A	H	H	A	A	A	H	A	A	H	A	H	H	H	A	A	H	H	H	A	H	A
Result	W	L	L	L	L	W	L	W	L	L	W	L	L	W	L	W	L	W	W	L	W	L	L	W	L	L	L	L	L	L	W	L	L	L
Position	1	7	10	13	15	10	15	12	14	16	16	16	16	14	15	15	15	14	13	13	13	12	13	12	12	16	16	16	16	16	16	16	16	16

Last updated: 9 February 2024.
Source: Competitive matches
Ground: A = Away; H = Home; R = Rest. Result: L = Loss; W = Win; R = Rest; P = Postponed.

Win Loss

==== Matches ====
Note: All times are CET (UTC+1) as listed by EuroLeague.

5 October 2023 1	Crvena Zvezda Meridianbet (Basketball Federation of Serbia)	94–73	(French Federation of Basketball) LDLC ASVEL	Belgrade
19:00	Scoring by quarter: 29-18, 23-17, 17-24, 25-18
	Pts: Napier 21; Rebs: Giedraitis, Ilić, Tobey 5 Asts: Giedraitis, Kuzmić 4 PIR: Giedraitis, Napier 20	Boxscore	Pts: Lauvergne 18; Rebs: Lauvergne 6 Asts: Lee 9 PIR: Lauvergne 19	Arena: Štark Arena; Attendance: 18,360; Referees: Fernando Rocha, Carmelo Paternico, Piotr Pastusiak

13 October 2023 2	Žalgiris (Lithuanian Basketball Federation)	79–74	(Basketball Federation of Serbia) Crvena Zvezda Meridianbet	Kaunas
19:00	Scoring by quarter: 19–21, 16–17, 15–18, 29–18
	Pts: Šmits 18; Rebs: Šmits 7 Asts: Evans 5 PIR: Šmits 21	Boxscore	Pts: Mitrović 16; Rebs: Mitrović 8 Asts: Teodosić, Nedović 4 PIR: Mitrović 20	Arena: Žalgiris Arena; Attendance: 15,044; Referees: Mehdi Difallah, Milan Nedović, Carlos Cortés

18 October 2023 3	Crvena Zvezda Meridianbet (Basketball Federation of Serbia)	76–82	(French Federation of Basketball) AS Monaco	Belgrade
20:00	Scoring by quarter: 23–14, 21–24, 19–26, 13–18
	Pts: Giedraitis 20; Rebs: Simonović 5 Asts: Nedović 6 PIR: Nedović 22	Boxscore	Pts: James 18; Rebs: Diallo 8 Asts: James 11; PIR: James 24	Arena: Štark Arena; Attendance: 19,123; Referees: Saša Pukl, Saulius Račys, Luka Kardum

20 October 2023 4	Virtus Segafredo Bologna (Italian Basketball Federation)	85–79	(Basketball Federation of Serbia) Crvena Zvezda Meridianbet	Bologna
20:30	Scoring by quarter: 26–15, 18–18, 18–22, 23–24
	Pts: Shengelia 19; Rebs: Mickey 8 Asts: Cordinier 6 PIR: Cordinier 20	Boxscore	Pts: Napier 23; Rebs: Bolomboy 9 Asts: Napier 5 PIR: Napier 28	Arena: Virtus Segafredo Arena; Attendance: 5,369; Referees: Carlos Peruga, Igor Dragojević, Hugues Thépénier

26 October 2023 5	Partizan Mozzart Bet (Basketball Federation of Serbia)	88–86	(Basketball Federation of Serbia) Crvena Zvezda Meridianbet	Belgrade
18:30	Scoring by quarter: 22–13, 20–29, 11–23, 35–21
	Pts: Avramović 14; Rebs: Kaminsky 5 Asts: Nunnally, LeDay 4 PIR: LeDay 20	Boxscore	Pts: Bolomboy 16; Rebs: Mitrović 8 Asts: Teodosić 6 PIR: Mitrović 19	Arena: Štark Arena; Attendance: 20,039; Referees: Miguel Ángel Pérez, Gytis Vilius, Rain Peerandi

2 November 2023 6	Crvena zvezda Meridianbet (Basketball Federation of Serbia)	74–68	(German Basketball Federation) Bayern Munich	Belgrade
18:30	Scoring by quarter: 12-19, 21-16, 20-24, 21-9
	Pts: Teodosić 16; Rebs: Davidovac, Bolomboy 7 Asts: Teodosić 11; PIR: Teodosić 22	Boxscore	Pts: Edwards 16; Rebs: Booker 9 Asts: Bolmaro, Ibaka 4 PIR: Bolmaro 19	Arena: Štark Arena; Attendance: 18,130; Referees: Emilio Perez, Michele Rossi, Sergio Silva

10 November 2023 7	Barcelona (Spanish Basketball Federation)	86–81	(Basketball Federation of Serbia) Crvena zvezda Meridianbet	Barcelona
20:30	Scoring by quarter: 21-18, 26-25, 18-19, 21-19
	Pts: Parker 20; Rebs: Kalinić, Satoranský, Parker 5 Asts: Satoranský 6 PIR: Satoranský, Parker 19	Boxscore	Pts: Mitrović 22; Rebs: Bolomboy 9 Asts: Teodosić 9 PIR: Mitrović 19	Arena: Palau Blaugrana; Attendance: 5,473; Referees: Damir Javor, Carmelo Paternico, Robert Vyklicky

14 November 2023 8	Crvena zvezda Meridianbet (Basketball Federation of Serbia)	87–56	(Turkish Basketball Federation) Fenerbahçe Beko	Belgrade
20:45	Scoring by quarter: 25-16, 20-10, 15-14, 27-16
	Pts: Teodosić 18; Rebs: Mitrović 8 Asts: Nedović 5 PIR: Teodosić 21	Boxscore	Pts: Hayes-Davis 12; Rebs: Sestina 5 Asts: Madar 3 PIR: Sestina 11	Arena: Štark Arena; Attendance: 19,637; Referees: Mehdi Difallah, Milan Nedović, Guido Giovannetti

16 November 2023 9	Olympiacos (Hellenic Basketball Federation)	88–83	(Basketball Federation of Serbia) Crvena zvezda Meridianbet	Piraeus
20:15	Scoring by quarter: 20–23, 25–21, 19–9, 24–30
	Pts: Peters 28; Rebs: Fall 14; Asts: Walkup 8 PIR: Peters 31	Boxscore	Pts: Nedović 26; Rebs: Mitrović 5 Asts: Nedović, Teodosić 4 PIR: Nedović 28	Arena: Peace and Friendship Stadium; Attendance: 10,962; Referees: Oļegs Latiševs, Tomasz Trawicki, Josip Radojković

24 November 2023 10	Crvena zvezda Meridianbet (Basketball Federation of Serbia)	71–93	(Italian Basketball Federation) EA7 Emporio Armani Milan	Belgrade
20:30	Scoring by quarter: 19–20, 20–18, 17–25, 15–30
	Pts: Davidovac 18; Rebs: Davidovac 6 Asts: Teodosić 4 PIR: Mitrović, Davidovac 23	Boxscore	Pts: Lô 32; Rebs: three players 5 Asts: Lô 3 PIR: Lô 38	Arena: Štark Arena; Attendance: 19,854; Referees: Emin Moğulkoç, Ioannis Foufis, Saulius Račys

1 December 2023 11	Crvena zvezda Meridianbet (Basketball Federation of Serbia)	97–83	(Turkish Basketball Federation) Anadolu Efes	Belgrade
20:00	Scoring by quarter: 22-21, 21-28, 29-21, 25-13
	Pts: Nedović 23; Rebs: Mitrović 7 Asts: Dos Santos 5 PIR: Dos Santos 28	Boxscore	Pts: Larkin 21; Rebs: Jones 10; Asts: Larkin 5 PIR: Larkin 19	Arena: Štark Arena; Attendance: 18,290; Referees: Carmelo Paternico, Carlos Cortes, Alberto Baena

6 December 2023 12	Valencia Basket (Spanish Basketball Federation)	85–81	(Basketball Federation of Serbia) Crvena zvezda Meridianbet	Valencia
20:30 (CET)	Scoring by quarter: 25–19, 31–21, 16–25, 13–16
	Pts: Davies 21; Rebs: Ojeleye 6 Asts: Harper 5 PIR: Ojeleye 24	Boxscore	Pts: Nedović, Napier 14; Rebs: Bolomboy 7 Asts: Teodosić 9 PIR: Teodosić 20	Arena: La Fonteta; Attendance: 6,817; Referees: Artūras Šukys, Damir Javor, Josip Radojković

8 December 2023 13	Baskonia (Spanish Basketball Federation)	87–85	(Basketball Federation of Serbia) Crvena zvezda Meridianbet	Vitoria-Gasteiz
20:30	Scoring by quarter: 26–18, 26–25, 15–19, 20–23
	Pts: Sedekerskis 18; Rebs: Moneke 9 Asts: Miller-McIntyre 12; PIR: Sedekerskis 24	Boxscore	Pts: Giedraitis 24; Rebs: Mitrović 16; Asts: Mitrović 7 PIR: Giedraitis, Mitrović 24	Arena: Buesa Arena; Attendance: 10,470; Referees: Jakub Zamojski, Robert Vyklický, Steve Bittner

14 December 2023 14	Crvena zvezda Meridianbet (Basketball Federation of Serbia)	85–71	(German Basketball Federation) ALBA Berlin	Belgrade
19:00	Scoring by quarter: 25-22, 26-20, 20-11, 14-18
	Pts: Nedović 20; Rebs: Bolomboy 6 Asts: Teodosić, Nedović 5 PIR: Nedović 24	Boxscore	Pts: Olinde 13; Rebs: Delow 7 Asts: Delow 9 PIR: Delow 15	Arena: Štark Arena; Attendance: 17,993; Referees: Fernando Rocha, Carlos Peruga, Marcin Kowalski

19 December 2023 15	Crvena zvezda Meridianbet (Basketball Federation of Serbia)	58–72	(Spanish Basketball Federation) Real Madrid	Belgrade
19:00	Scoring by quarter: 20–20, 14–25, 11–16, 13–11
	Pts: Mitrović, Teodosić 14; Rebs: Bolomboy 10; Asts: Teodosić 5 PIR: Teodosić 18	Boxscore	Pts: Hezonja 17; Rebs: Hezonja 10; Asts: Rodríguez 8 PIR: Hezonja 19	Arena: Štark Arena; Attendance: 19,714; Referees: Emin Moğulkoç, Tomasz Trawicki, Sérgio Silva

21 December 2023 16	Maccabi Playtika Tel Aviv (Israeli Basketball Association)	92–98	(Basketball Federation of Serbia) Crvena zvezda Meridianbet	Belgrade
20:05	Scoring by quarter: 20-20, 22-31, 23-28, 27-19
	Pts: Baldwin IV 22; Rebs: Nebo 7 Asts: Brown 6 PIR: Baldwin IV 30	Boxscore	Pts: Teodosić 27; Rebs: Mitrović 7 Asts: Teodosić 14; PIR: Teodosić 40	Arena: Aleksandar Nikolić Hall; Attendance: 0 Referees: Sreten Radović, Jordi Aliaga, Alberto Baena

28 December 2023 17	Panathinaikos AKTOR (Hellenic Basketball Federation)	82–65	(Basketball Federation of Serbia) Crvena zvezda Meridianbet	Marousi
20:15	Scoring by quarter: 20–17, 18–14, 23–19, 21–15
	Pts: Mitoglou 15; Rebs: Hernangómez 8 Asts: Sloukas 7 PIR: Mitoglou 20	Boxscore	Pts: Nedović, Bolomboy 15; Rebs: Davidovac 7 Asts: dos Santos 4 PIR: Mitrović 19	Arena: OAKA Altion; Attendance: 18,124; Referees: Robert Lottermoser, Joseph Bissang, Mario Majkić

2 January 2024 18	Fenerbahçe Beko (Turkish Basketball Federation)	76–85	(Basketball Federation of Serbia) Crvena zvezda Meridianbet	Istanbul
18:45	Scoring by quarter: 26–18, 9–16, 22–23, 19–28
	Pts: Hayes 21; Rebs: Hayes 9 Asts: Wilbekin 4 PIR: Hayes 28	Boxscore	Pts: Bolomboy 24; Rebs: Giedraitis 7 Asts: Teodosić 8 PIR: Bolomboy 31	Arena: Ülker Sports and Event Hall; Attendance: 8,153; Referees: Jakub Zamojski, Maxime Boubert, Igor Dragojević

4 January 2024 19	Crvena zvezda Meridianbet (Basketball Federation of Serbia)	88–72	(Basketball Federation of Serbia) Partizan Mozzart Bet	Belgrade
20:00	Scoring by quarter: 24–13, 26–16, 15–19, 23–24
	Pts: Nedović 16; Rebs: Giedraitis 7 Asts: Teodosić 7 PIR: Teodosić 23	Boxscore	Pts: Punter 17; Rebs: Caboclo 7 Asts: Dozier, Nunnally 3 PIR: Caboclo 18	Arena: Štark Arena; Attendance: 20,143; Referees: Fernando Rocha, Carlos Peruga, Piotr Pastusiak

9 January 2024 20	LDLC ASVEL (French Federation of Basketball)	100–91	(Basketball Federation of Serbia) Crvena zvezda Meridianbet	Villeurbanne
20:30	Scoring by quarter: 25–25, 23–20, 22–22, 30–24
	Pts: Lee 23; Rebs: Fall 9 Asts: Lee 7 PIR: Lee 23	Boxscore	Pts: Nedović 26; Rebs: Davidovac 6 Asts: dos Santos 9 PIR: dos Santos 23	Arena: Astroballe; Attendance: 5,476; Referees: Damir Javor, Carmelo Paternicò, Saulius Račys

11 January 2024 21	EA7 Emporio Armani Milan (Italian Basketball Federation)	62–76	(Basketball Federation of Serbia) Crvena zvezda Meridianbet	Assago
20:30	Scoring by quarter: 15–23, 16–24, 16–10, 15–19
	Pts: Bortolani 14; Rebs: Melli, Napier 5 Asts: Hall, Napier 4 PIR: Voigtmann 14	Boxscore	Pts: Giedraitis 22; Rebs: three players 6 Asts: Teodosić 5 PIR: Giedraitis 27	Arena: Mediolanum Forum; Attendance: 9,358; Referees: Oļegs Latiševs, Jordi Aliaga, Marcin Kowalski

18 January 2024 22	Crvena zvezda Meridianbet (Basketball Federation of Serbia)	90–91	(Spanish Basketball Federation) Baskonia	Belgrade
19:00	Scoring by quarter: 30–20, 22–23, 10–26, 28–22
	Pts: dos Santos 26; Rebs: Bolomboy, Giedraitis 5 Asts: dos Santos 5 PIR: dos Santos 26	Boxscore	Pts: Howard 32; Rebs: Moneke 12; Asts: Miller-McIntyre 9 PIR: Moneke 27	Arena: Štark Arena; Attendance: 20,270; Referees: Matej Boltauzer, Milan Nedović, Huseyin Celik

25 January 2024 23	ALBA Berlin (German Basketball Federation)	89–80	(Basketball Federation of Serbia) Crvena zvezda Meridianbet	Berlin
20:00	Scoring by quarter: 18–16, 33–20, 21–18, 17–26
	Pts: Thomas 19; Rebs: Wetzell 9 Asts: Hermannsson 5 PIR: Wetzell 21	Boxscore	Pts: dos Santos 20; Rebs: Bolomboy 11; Asts: four players 2 PIR: dos Santos 19	Arena: Mercedes-Benz Arena; Attendance: 8,579; Referees: Carlos Peruga, Michele Rossi, Dragan Porobić

30 January 2024 24	Crvena zvezda Meridianbet (Basketball Federation of Serbia)	82–64	(Spanish Basketball Federation) Valencia Basket	Belgrade
20:00	Scoring by quarter: 11-12, 28-18, 22-19, 21-15
	Pts: Nedović 27; Rebs: Bolomboy 6 Asts: Teodosić 7 PIR: Nedović 27	Boxscore	Pts: Jones 11; Rebs: Inglis, Ojeleye 5 Asts: four players 2 PIR: Jones 12	Arena: Štark Arena; Attendance: 18,346; Referees: Robert Lottermoser, Emin Mogulkoc, Saso Petek

2 February 2024 25	Crvena zvezda Meridianbet (Basketball Federation of Serbia)	76–85	(Spanish Basketball Federation) Barcelona	Belgrade
20:00	Scoring by quarter: 17–18, 15–27, 19–19, 25–21
	Pts: Nedović 21; Rebs: Bolomboy 10; Asts: dos Santos 7 PIR: Bolomboy 21	Boxscore	Pts: Brizuela 20; Rebs: Veselý 8 Asts: Satoranský 6 PIR: Brizuela 22	Arena: Štark Arena; Attendance: 20,875; Referees: Fernando Rocha, Saulius Račys, Kristaps Konstantinovs

9 February 2024 26	Crvena zvezda Meridianbet (Basketball Federation of Serbia)	91–93	(Lithuanian Basketball Federation) Žalgiris	Belgrade
20:00	Scoring by quarter: 22-23, 23-22, 20-23, 26-25
	Pts: dos Santos 21; Rebs: Giedraitis 8 Asts: dos Santos 14; PIR: dos Santos 32	Boxscore	Pts: Evans 25; Rebs: Hayes, Birutis 4 Asts: Evans 6 PIR: Evans 28	Arena: Štark Arena; Attendance: 18,754; Referees: Juan Carlos Garcia, Carmelo Paternico, Jordi Aliaga

1 March 2024 27	Bayern Munich (German Basketball Federation)	74–66	(Basketball Federation of Serbia) Crvena zvezda Meridianbet	Munich
20:30	Scoring by quarter: 20–19, 12–8, 21–19, 21–20
	Pts: Booker 22; Rebs: Ibaka 8 Asts: Weiler-Babb 5 PIR: Ibaka 22	Boxscore	Pts: Smart 13; Rebs: Bolomboy 9 Asts: dos Santos 5 PIR: Bolomboy 18	Arena: BMW Park; Attendance: 6,147; Referees: Miguel Ángel Pérez, Ioannis Foufis, Robert Vyklický

7 March 2024 28	AS Monaco (French Federation of Basketball)	98–80	(Basketball Federation of Serbia) Crvena zvezda Meridianbet	Fontvieille
19:00	Scoring by quarter: 25-17, 21-21, 23-22, 29-20
	Pts: James 20; Rebs: Motiejūnas 6 Asts: Okobo 7 PIR: Okobo 20	Boxscore	Pts: Mitrović 18; Rebs: Mitrović 10; Asts: dos Santos 5 PIR: Mitrović, Bolomboy 21	Arena: Salle Gaston Médecin; Attendance: 5,000; Referees: Carlos Peruga, Carmelo Paternico, Saulius Racys, Luka Kardum

14 March 2024 29	(Basketball Federation of Serbia) Crvena zvezda Meridianbet	80–84	Maccabi Playtika Tel Aviv (Israeli Basketball Association)	Belgrade
19:00	Scoring by quarter: 21-17, 26-14, 14-22, 19-31
	Pts: dos Santos 20; Rebs: Bolomboy 8 Asts: Hanga, dos Santos 7 PIR: dos Santos 17	Boxscore	Pts: Colson 23; Rebs: Nebo 13; Asts: Brown, Baldwin 5 PIR: Nebo 33	Arena: Štark Arena; Attendance: 12,537; Referees: Fernando Rocha, Gytis Vilius, Sašo Petek

20 March 2024 30	(Basketball Federation of Serbia) Crvena zvezda Meridianbet	76–89	Panathinaikos AKTOR (Hellenic Basketball Federation)	Belgrade
20:00	Scoring by quarter: 20–29, 21-22, 15-19, 20-19
	Pts: Davidovac, Nedović 19; Rebs: Bolomboy 8 Asts: Nedović 7 PIR: Nedović 23	Boxscore	Pts: Lessort 19; Rebs: Mitoglou 9 Asts: Sloukas 10; PIR: Lessort 30	Arena: Štark Arena; Attendance: 13,126; Referees: Juan Carlos García, Piotr Pastusiak, Kristaps Konstantinovs

22 March 2024 31	(Basketball Federation of Serbia) Crvena zvezda Meridianbet	94–79	Virtus Segafredo Bologna (Italian Basketball Federation)	Belgrade
19:00	Scoring by quarter: 21-23, 27-19, 26-23, 20-14
	Pts: Nedović 25; Rebs: Hanga 7 Asts: Teodosić 9 PIR: Nedović 30	Boxscore	Pts: Shengelia 25; Rebs: Abass, Dunston 6 Asts: Shengelia 5 PIR: Lundberg 30	Arena: Štark Arena; Attendance: 12,708; Referees: Emin Moğulkoç, Carlos Cortés, Saulius Račys

29 March 2024 32	(Spanish Basketball Federation) Real Madrid	101–94	(Basketball Federation of Serbia) Crvena zvezda Meridianbet	Madrid
20:30	Scoring by quarter: 20-21, 24-26, 28-28, 29-19
	Pts: Musa 30; Rebs: Tavares 11; Asts: Rodriguez, Llull 6 PIR: Musa 40	Boxscore	Pts: Nedović 30; Rebs: Hanga 6 Asts: Hanga 7 PIR: Nedović 32	Arena: WiZink Center; Attendance: 9,189; Referees: Matej Boltauzer, Artūras Šukys, Maxime Boubert

4 April 2024 33	(Basketball Federation of Serbia) Crvena zvezda Meridianbet	86–89	Olympiacos (Hellenic Basketball Federation)	Belgrade
19:00	Scoring by quarter: 14-23, 25-19, 25-21, 22-26
	Pts: Hanga, Bolomboy 19; Rebs: Bolomboy 12; Asts: Teodosić 8 PIR: Bolomboy 32	Boxscore	Pts: Wright 20; Rebs: Fall 5 Asts: Williams-Goss 6 PIR: Wright 25	Arena: Štark Arena; Attendance: 15,456; Referees: Carlos Peruga, Gytis Vilius, Rain Peerandi

11 April 2024 34	(Turkish Basketball Federation) Anadolu Efes	100–55	(Basketball Federation of Serbia) Crvena zvezda Meridianbet	Istanbul
19:30	Scoring by quarter: 15-11, 30-20, 31-13, 24-11
	Pts: Bryant 26; Rebs: Osmani 7 Asts: Larkin 7 PIR: Oturu, Larkin 24	Boxscore	Pts: Mitrović 11; Rebs: Bolomboy 8 Asts: Teodosić 4 PIR: Mitrović 20	Arena: Sinan Erdem Dome; Attendance: 14,859; Referees: Juan Carlos García, Piotr Pastusiak, Hugues Thépénier

=== Adriatic Supercup ===
Crvena zvezda had canceled their participation at the Supercup, due to their previously scheduled pre-season tournaments, which are held in the same period.

=== Radivoj Korać Cup ===
The 2024 Radivoj Korać Cup was the 22nd season of the Serbian men's national basketball cup tournament. Crvena zvezda successfully defended their title beating Partizan in the finals, winning their 10th title and 4th one in a row.

Win Loss

14 February 2024 Quarterfinals	Crvena zvezda Meridianbet	80–75	FMP	Niš
20:00	Scoring by quarter: 17-16, 23-20, 18-19, 22-20
	Pts: Nedović 20; Rebs: Hanga 8 Asts: dos Santos 4 PIR: Davidovac 19	Boxscore	Pts: Kuzmić 18; Rebs: Kuzmić 15; Asts: Roberts 4 PIR: Kuzmić 34	Arena: Čair Sports Center; Attendance: 3,700; Referees: Stefanovic I., Vlahovic N., Stanic T

16 February 2024 Semifinals	Čačak 94 Quantox	52–87	Crvena zvezda Meridianbet	Niš
17:00	Scoring by quarter: 15-15, 8-20, 14-29, 15-23
	Pts: Lakić 11; Rebs: Gašić 5 Asts: Pešaković 3 PIR: Stojan 9	Boxscore	Pts: Mitrović 15; Rebs: Ilić 7 Asts: dos Santos 7 PIR: Mitrović 25	Arena: Čair Sports Center; Attendance: 3,600; Referees: Prpa S., Veskovic V., Hadzic M.

17 February 2024 Final	Crvena zvezda Meridianbet	85–79	Partizan Mozzart Bet	Niš
21:00	Scoring by quarter: 15-18, 28-26, 25-19, 17-16
	Pts: Giedraitis 17; Rebs: Mitrović 6 Asts: Teodosić, dos Santos 5 PIR: Teodosić 27	Boxscore	Pts: LeDay 24; Rebs: Punter 9 Asts: Dozier, Kaminsky 4 PIR: LeDay 37	Arena: Čair Sports Center; Attendance: 5,000; Referees: Jevtovic, Calic, Milojevic

== Individual awards ==
=== ABA League ===
MVP of the Round
Round	Player	PIR
11	(Serbia) Nemanja Nedović	32

=== EuroLeague ===
MVP of the Round
Round	Player	PIR
16	(Serbia) Miloš Teodosić	40

== Statistics ==
Legend
GP	Games played	GS	Games started	MPG	Minutes per game
FG%	Field-goal percentage	3FG%	3-point field-goal percentage	FT%	Free-throw percentage
RPG	Rebounds per game	APG	Assists per game	SPG	Steals per game
BPG	Blocks per game	PPG	Points per game	PIR	PIR per game

Player	Left during season

=== Adriatic League ===
Player	GP	GS	MPG	2FG%	3FG%	FT%	RPG	APG	SPG	BPG	PPG	PIR
Joel Bolomboy	18	13	16:00	.703	.333	.692	3.7	0.6	0.3	0.7	6.3	8.3
Dejan Davidovac	19	5	17:00	.667	.389	.857	3.2	1.6	1.0	0.1	5.3	8.5
Yago dos Santos	20	11	20:00	.644	.384	.882	2.1	4.1	0.4	0.0	10.3	12.5
Rokas Giedraitis	20	19	22:00	.628	.465	.758	2.9	1.8	0.7	0.1	10.0	10.8
Freddie Gillespie	8	0	9:00	.500	.000	.333	2.3	0.0	0.1	0.5	2.3	0.8
Ádám Hanga	13	4	16:00	.294	.310	.500	2.0	2.2	0.9	0.1	4.2	4.8
Dalibor Ilić	14	1	10:00	.565	.300	.640	3.3	0.3	0.4	0.1	3.6	5.4
Stefan Lazarević	15	0	12:00	.636	.389	.706	1.6	0.4	0.4	0.1	4.1	3.1
Branko Lazić	12	11	16:00	.400	.368	.813	1.3	0.8	1.0	0.0	5.6	4.4
Luka Mitrović	18	12	16:00	.719	.000	.698	3.4	1.9	0.9	0.2	9.7	12.4
Nemanja Nedović	14	7	22:00	.544	.296	.816	2.0	3.9	0.7	0.0	12.6	11.7
Javonte Smart	4	0	19:00	.556	.400	.750	4.0	1.0	0.5	0.0	9.3	9.3
Miloš Teodosić	15	2	18:00	.500	.365	.946	1.3	5.3	0.5	0.2	7.3	9.5
Trey Thompkins	0	0	0:00	.000	.000	.000	0.0	0.0	0.0	0.0	0.0	0.0
Mike Tobey	20	5	16:00	.685	.465	.762	5.0	0.9	0.7	0.8	9.9	12.7
Nikola Topić	1	1	24:00	.400	.000	1.000	3.0	5.0	0.0	1.0	8.0	6.0
Ognjen Kuzmić	2	0	7:00	.667	.000	.500	1.0	0.0	0.0	0.0	2.5	2.0
Shabazz Napier	9	5	21:00	.581	.350	.870	1.8	4.4	1.6	0.0	10.9	12.8
Marko Simonović	11	4	14:00	.722	.235	.833	3.9	0.6	0.4	0.1	6.3	6.3

Last updated: 11 February 2024.
Source: Adriatic League

=== Euroleague ===
Player	GP	GS	MPG	2FG%	3FG%	FT%	RPG	APG	SPG	BPG	PPG	PIR
Joel Bolomboy	25	23	24:59	.649	.304	.826	5.5	0.8	1.0	0.5	9.9	13.7
Dejan Davidovac	25	11	19:41	.541	.375	.583	3.1	0.6	0.8	0.3	4.4	5.7
Yago dos Santos	24	13	19:41	.449	.421	.822	1.9	3.8	0.5	0.0	8.5	9.6
Rokas Giedraitis	26	17	26:12	.542	.364	.827	4.2	1.0	1.1	0.1	10.6	11.2
Freddie Gillespie	9	0	7:37	.600	.000	.444	2.1	0.3	0.3	0.3	3.1	3.4
Ádám Hanga	18	5	19:17	.522	.277	.474	2.7	1.7	0.9	0.3	7.4	6.5
Dalibor Ilić	9	1	5:06	.333	.333	.000	1.6	0.1	0.0	0.1	0.8	1.2
Stefan Lazarević	13	2	7:46	.556	.333	1.000	1.1	0.2	0.1	0.0	1.2	0.8
Branko Lazić	17	14	14:21	.533	.345	.900	1.6	0.4	0.5	0.1	3.2	1.8
Luka Mitrović	23	14	20:14	.568	.500	.671	5.0	1.7	0.7	0.3	9.4	12.4
Nemanja Nedović	23	11	21:07	.538	.406	.869	1.6	2.3	0.6	0.1	13.7	12.3
Javonte Smart	5	0	17:51	.684	.182	1.000	2.0	1.4	0.4	0.2	9.6	7.8
Miloš Teodosić	23	4	21:39	.523	.346	.806	2.1	5.7	0.8	0.1	10.0	11.9
Trey Thompkins	0	0	0:00	.000	.000	.000	0.0	0.0	0.0	0.0	0.0	0.0
Mike Tobey	23	2	11:09	.534	.263	.615	2.6	0.4	0.1	0.5	4.3	3.3
Nikola Topić	2	2	15:22	.500	.000	1.000	1.5	3.5	0.5	0.0	3.5	4.5
Ognjen Kuzmić	3	1	12:13	.000	.000	.000	2.3	1.7	0.0	0.3	0.0	2.0
Shabazz Napier	12	7	17:44	.444	.305	.826	1.7	2.3	1.3	0.0	9.8	7.8
Marko Simonović	11	3	7:31	.555	.182	.750	1.5	0.1	0.5	0.0	2.8	1.2

Last updated: 9 February 2024.
Source: Euroleague

== See also ==
- 2023–24 Red Star Belgrade season
