= 2023–24 ABA League First Division =

23rd ABA League season

AdmiralBet ABA League
- Season: 2023–24
- Games played: 26 fixtures (338 total)
- Teams: 14
- TV partner: Arena Sport

Regular season
- Top seed: (Serbia) Crvena zvezda Meridianbet
- Season MVP: (Croatia) Luka Božić
- Promoted: (Basketball Federation of Serbia) Spartak Office Shoes

Finals
- Champions: (Basketball Federation of Serbia) Crvena zvezda Meridianbet (7th title)
- Runners-up: (Basketball Federation of Serbia) Partizan Mozzart Bet
- Semi-finalists: (Basketball Federation of Montenegro) Budućnost VOLI (Basketball Federation of Serbia) Mega Basket
- Finals MVP: (Brazil) Yago dos Santos

Awards
- Top Prospect: (Serbia) Nikola Topić
- Best Defensive Player: (Serbia) Branko Lazić
- Best Coach: (Croatia) Danijel Jusup

Statistical leaders
Points	(Croatia) Luka Božić	20.6
Rebounds	(United States) Marcus Weathers	8.1
Assists	(Slovenia) Jan Špan	6.8
Index Rating	(Croatia) Luka Božić	29.2

Records
- Biggest home win: Crvena zvezda 110–57 Krka (10 March 2024)
- Biggest away win: FMP 61–105 Partizan (2 December 2023)
- Highest scoring: Partizan 110–102 Cedevita Olimpija (3 March 2024)
- Winning streak: Budućnost 10 games
- Losing streak: Mornar 10 games
- Highest attendance: 23,021; Partizan 112–80 Mega (22 January 2024)
- Lowest attendance: 200; SC Derby 86-84 Borac (11 February 2024)
- All statistics correct as of 8 April 2024.

The 2023–24 AdmiralBet ABA League is the 23rd season of the ABA League with 14 teams from former Yugoslavia, namely Bosnia and Herzegovina, Croatia, Montenegro, Serbia, and Slovenia participating in it.

== Teams ==
=== Promotion and relegation ===
A total of 14 teams will contest the league in the 2023–24 season (and until the 2024–25 season).

Promoted	(Basketball Federation of Slovenia) Krka	2022–23 ABA 2 Champion
Relegated	(Basketball Federation of North Macedonia) MZT Skopje Aerodrom	Finished last

=== Venues and locations ===
Location of teams in the 2023–24 season
Locations of the teams from Belgrade in the 2023–24 season

Team	Home city	Arena	Capacity
(Basketball Federation of Serbia) Borac Mozzart	Čačak	Borac Hall	4,000
(Basketball Federation of Montenegro) Budućnost VOLI	Podgorica	Morača Sports Center	6,000
(Basketball Federation of Slovenia) Cedevita Olimpija	Ljubljana	Arena Stožice	12,480
(Slovenia) Krka	Novo Mesto	Leon Štukelj Hall	2,500
(Croatian Basketball Federation) Cibona	Zagreb	Dražen Petrović Hall	5,400
(Basketball Federation of Serbia) Crvena zvezda Meridianbet	Belgrade	Aleksandar Nikolić Hall	8,000
(Basketball Federation of Serbia) FMP Meridian	Belgrade	Železnik Hall	3,000
(Basketball Federation of Bosnia and Herzegovina) Igokea m:tel	Aleksandrovac	Laktaši Sports Hall	3,050
(Basketball Federation of Serbia) Mega MIS	Belgrade	Ranko Žeravica Sports Hall	5,000
(Basketball Federation of Montenegro) Mornar Barsko zlato	Bar	Topolica Sport Hall	2,625
(Basketball Federation of Serbia) Partizan Mozzart Bet	Belgrade	Štark Arena	18,386
(Basketball Federation of Montenegro) SC Derby	Podgorica	Morača Sports Center	6,000
(Croatian Basketball Federation) Split	Split	Arena Gripe	3,500
(Croatian Basketball Federation) Zadar	Zadar	Krešimir Ćosić Hall	7,997

=== Personnel and sponsorship ===
Team	Head coach	Captain	Kit manufacturer	Shirt sponsor
Borac Mozzart	(Basketball Federation of Serbia) Dejan Mijatović	(Basketball Federation of Serbia) Nemanja Todorović	—	MozzartSport / P.S. Fashion
Budućnost VOLI	(Basketball Federation of Slovenia) Andrej Žakelj	(Basketball Federation of Montenegro) Petar Popović	Spalding	VOLI / Podgorica Capital City
Cedevita Olimpija	(Basketball Federation of Slovenia) Zoran Martič	(Basketball Federation of Slovenia) Edo Murić	Adidas	Cedevita
Cibona	(Croatian Basketball Federation) Dino Repeša	(Croatian Basketball Federation) Krešimir Radovčić	GBT	Erste Bank
Crvena zvezda Meridianbet	(Hellenic Basketball Federation) Ioannis Sfairopoulos	(Basketball Federation of Serbia) Branko Lazić	Adidas	Meridian / mts
FMP Meridian	(Basketball Federation of Serbia) Saša Nikitović	(USA Basketball) Charles Jenkins	Adidas	Meridian
Igokea m:tel	(Basketball Federation of Serbia) Vladimir Jovanović	(Basketball Federation of Serbia) Marko Jošilo	GBT	m:tel
Mega MIS	(Basketball Federation of Serbia) Marko Barać	(Basketball Federation of Serbia) Luka Cerovina	Adidas	Medical Innovation Solutions / Triglav
Mornar Barsko zlato	(Basketball Federation of Montenegro) Mihailo Pavićević	(Basketball Federation of Montenegro) Sead Šehović	DaCapo	Bar Municipality / Barsko zlato
Krka	(Basketball Federation of Slovenia) Gašper Okorn	(Basketball Federation of Slovenia) Jan Špan		Krka
Partizan Mozzart Bet	(Basketball Federation of Serbia) Željko Obradović	(USA Basketball) Kevin Punter	Under Armour	NIS / Mozzart Bet
SC Derby	(Basketball Federation of Slovenia) Dejan Jakara	(Basketball Federation of Montenegro) Nikola Pavličević	Spalding	Derby
Split	(Croatian Basketball Federation) Slaven Rimac	(Croatian Basketball Federation) Mate Kalajžić	Macron	—
Zadar	(Croatian Basketball Federation) Danijel Jusup	(Croatian Basketball Federation) Marko Ramljak	Macron	OTP Bank / PSK

=== Coaching changes ===
Team	Outgoing manager	Date of vacancy	Position in table	Replaced with	Date of appointment	Ref.
Split	(Croatian Basketball Federation) Srđan Subotić	7 June 2023	Off-season	(Croatian Basketball Federation) Slaven Rimac	28 July 2023	
Cedevita Olimpija	(Basketball Federation of Slovenia) Miro Alilović	13 June 2023	Off-season	(Italian Basketball Federation) Simone Pianigiani	13 June 2023	
Cibona	(Croatian Basketball Federation) Josip Sesar	15 July 2023	Off-season	(Croatian Basketball Federation) Jakša Vulić	15 August 2023	
Crvena zvezda	(Basketball Federation of Montenegro) Duško Ivanović	21 October 2023	1th (3–0)	(Hellenic Basketball Federation) Ioannis Sfairopoulos	22 October 2023	
Budućnost	(Basketball Federation of Montenegro) Petar Mijović	9 November 2023	3rd (5–1)	(Basketball Federation of Slovenia) Andrej Žakelj	18 November 2023	
KK SC Derby	(Basketball Federation of Slovenia) Andrej Žakelj	18 November 2023	7th (6–6)	(Basketball Federation of Slovenia) Dejan Jakara	19 November 2023	
Cibona	(Croatian Basketball Federation) Jakša Vulić	5 December 2023	12th (3–7)	(Croatian Basketball Federation) Dino Repeša	14 December 2023	
FMP	(Basketball Federation of Serbia) Nenad Stefanović	12 December 2023	12th (3–8)	(Basketball Federation of Serbia) Stevan Mijović	13 December 2023	
Cedevita Olimpija	(Italian Basketball Federation) Simone Pianigiani	1 January 2024	3rd (10–4)	(Basketball Federation of Slovenia) Zoran Martič	1 January 2024	
FMP Meridian	(Basketball Federation of Serbia) Stevan Mijović	30 January 2024	12th (5–13)	(Basketball Federation of Serbia) Saša Nikitović	31 January 2024	

=== Referees ===
A total of 57 ABA officials set to work on the 2023–24 season in ABA 1 and ABA 2:

The list of referees for the 2023–24 season
(Bosnia and Herzegovina) Dragan Porobić; (Bosnia and Herzegovina) Ernad Karović; (Bosnia and Herzegovina) Ivan Milićević; (Bosnia and Herzegovina) Milan Danilović; (Bosnia and Herzegovina) Nermin Nikšić; (Bosnia and Herzegovina) Tomislav Stapić; (Bosnia and Herzegovina) Vladimir Marić; (Croatia) Bojan Kruljac; (Croatia) Boris Hartman; (Croatia) Denis Hadžić; (Croatia) Gordan Terlević; (Croatia) Hrvoje Muhvić; (Croatia) Josip Radojković; (Croatia) Krešimir Katić; (Croatia) Krunoslav Peić; (Croatia) Luka Kardum; (Croatia) Marko Stanković; (Croatia) Marko Mustapić; (Croatia) Mateo Pavičić	(Croatia) Tomislav Hordov; (Croatia) Tomislav Vovk; (Montenegro) Bojan Popović; (Montenegro) Igor Dragojević; (Montenegro) Igor Janjušević; (Montenegro) Miloš Koljenšić; (Montenegro) Miodrag Lakićević; (Montenegro) Radoš Savović; (Montenegro) Vojislav Lepetić; (North Macedonia) Aleksandar Davidov; (North Macedonia) Boro Antovski; (North Macedonia) Nikola Jakimovski; (North Macedonia) Vladimir Mihajlović; (Serbia) Aleksandar Milojević; (Serbia) Dragan Matić; (Serbia) Duško Sedlar; (Serbia) Ilija Belošević; (Serbia) Ivan Stefanović; (Serbia) Marko Juras	(Serbia) Milivoje Jovčić; (Serbia) Miloš Hadžić; (Serbia) Radoš Arsenijević; (Serbia) Stefan Ćalić; (Serbia) Strahinja Dašić; (Serbia) Uroš Obrknežević; (Serbia) Uroš Nikolić; (Serbia) Vladimir Vesković; (Serbia) Vladimir Tomić; (Slovenia) Andraž Rebeušek; (Slovenia) Damir Javor; (Slovenia) Damjan Gajšek; (Slovenia) Edo Javor; (Slovenia) Mario Majkić; (Slovenia) Matej Boltauzer; (Slovenia) Milan Nedović; (Slovenia) Milanko Milanović; (Slovenia) Saša Pukl; (Slovenia) Sašo Petek

== Regular season ==
The regular season is scheduled to commence on 29 September 2023 and end on 5 April 2024.

=== League table ===
Pos	Team	Pld	W	L	PF	PA	PD	Pts	Qualification or relegation
1	(Basketball Federation of Serbia) Crvena zvezda Meridianbet	26	22	4	2310	1877	+433	48	Advance to the Playoffs
2	(Basketball Federation of Serbia) Partizan Mozzart Bet	26	20	6	2423	1966	+457	46	Advance to the Playoffs
3	(Basketball Federation of Montenegro) Budućnost VOLI	26	19	7	2206	2002	+204	45	Advance to the Playoffs
4	(Basketball Federation of Serbia) Mega MIS	26	16	10	2246	2140	+106	42	Advance to the Playoffs
5	(Basketball Federation of Slovenia) Cedevita Olimpija	26	16	10	2235	2184	+51	42	Advance to the Playoffs
6	(Croatian Basketball Federation) Zadar	26	14	12	2050	2008	+42	40	Advance to the Playoffs
7	(Basketball Federation of Bosnia and Herzegovina) Igokea m:tel	26	13	13	2040	2117	−77	39	Advance to the Playoffs
8	(Basketball Federation of Montenegro) SC Derby	26	11	15	2206	2241	−35	37	Advance to the Playoffs
9	(Croatian Basketball Federation) Split	26	11	15	1986	2091	−105	37	
10	(Basketball Federation of Serbia) Borac Mozzart	26	10	16	2064	2181	−117	36	
11	(Basketball Federation of Serbia) FMP Meridian	26	10	16	2032	2195	−163	36	
12	(Croatian Basketball Federation) Cibona	26	9	17	2033	2189	−156	35	
13	(Basketball Federation of Montenegro) Mornar Barsko zlato	26	6	20	2023	2349	−326	32	
14	(Basketball Federation of Slovenia) Krka	26	5	21	1960	2274	−314	31	

Source: ABA League

=== Positions by round ===
Advance to the Playoffs

Team ╲ Round	1	2	3	4	5	6	7	8	9	10	11	12	13	14	15	16	17	18	19	20	21	22	23	24	25	26
(Serbia) Crvena zvezda Meridianbet	3	2	3	1	3	2	2	1	1	1	1	1	1	1	1	1	1	1	1	1	1	1	1	1	1	1
(Montenegro) Budućnost VOLI	2	3	2	2	1	3	1	2	5	4	4	5	5	4	4	3	3	3	2	2	2	2	2	2	3	3
(Serbia) Partizan Mozzart Bet	1	1	1	3	2	1	3	5	4	3	3	2	3	2	2	2	2	2	3	3	3	3	3	3	2	2
(Serbia) Mega MIS	9	10	8	6	8	8	6	6	6	7	7	9	8	6	6	6	7	7	7	7	7	6	6	6	4	4
(Slovenia) Cedevita Olimpija	7	9	7	9	7	6	5	4	3	5	5	4	2	3	3	4	4	4	4	4	4	4	5	4	5	5
(Croatia) Zadar	13	13	10	7	5	7	8	7	8	8	8	6	6	7	7	7	6	6	5	5	5	5	4	5	6	6
(Bosnia and Herzegovina) Igokea m:tel	12	7	6	5	4	5	4	3	2	2	2	3	4	5	5	5	5	5	6	6	6	7	7	7	7	7
(Montenegro) SC Derby	5	4	4	4	6	4	7	9	7	6	6	7	7	8	8	8	9	8	8	8	8	8	8	8	8	8
(Croatia) Split	10	11	12	11	11	11	12	13	12	10	11	11	11	10	10	9	10	9	9	9	9	9	9	9	9	9
(Serbia) Borac Mozzart	4	5	5	8	10	10	9	8	9	9	9	8	9	9	9	10	8	10	10	10	10	10	10	10	11	10
(Serbia) FMP Soccerbet	8	6	9	10	9	9	10	10	10	11	12	12	12	12	12	12	12	12	12	12	12	12	12	12	10	11
(Croatia) Cibona	11	12	13	13	14	12	11	11	11	12	10	10	10	11	11	11	11	11	11	11	11	11	11	11	12	12
(Montenegro) Mornar Barsko zlato	14	14	14	14	13	14	14	14	14	14	14	14	14	14	14	14	14	14	14	14	14	14	13	13	13	13
(Slovenia) Krka	6	8	11	12	12	13	13	12	13	13	13	13	13	13	13	13	13	13	13	13	13	13	14	14	14	14

Source: ABA League

=== Results ===
Home \ Away	BOR	BUD	COL	CIB	CZV	FMP	IGO	KRK	MEG	MOR	PAR	SCD	SPL	ZAD
Borac Mozzart	—	67–86	65–74	86–79	87–93	96–75	64–70	101–83	78–94	79–71	77–84	87–76	93–83	89–81
Budućnost VOLI	100–79	—	81–82	93–85	84–62	82–76	79–76	82–69	73–71	103–100	83–89	82–94	72–58	103–73
Cedevita Olimpija	82–78	72–80	—	93–91	96–86	82–74	106–74	91–79	89–87	105–89	95–91	102–93	97–68	73–79
Cibona	97–101	66–98	72–97	—	59–82	89–93	70–77	91–63	69–83	73–72	74–87	94–82	81–73	71–88
Crvena zvezda Meridianbet	90–74	95–86	94–51	84–56	—	87–54	80–48	110–57	83–89	95–75	88–86	94–78	89–67	93–54
FMP Meridian	86–72	84–76	84–96	72–77	72–83	—	78–64	97–99	73–83	111–94	61–105	86–99	84–66	77–96
Igokea m:tel	78–62	88–74	83–72	87–91	63–81	73–74	—	90–84	78–92	84–64	52–98	91–82	77–80	100–94
Krka	89–80	75–86	92–78	54–72	67–90	87–89	80–92	—	91–106	79–72	56–96	72–97	76–80	75–88
Mega MIS	89–90	72–92	97–86	80–76	88–98	86–72	92–76	72–77	—	101–87	88–86	88–79	92–78	91–81
Mornar Barsko zlato	80–78	61–87	74–86	88–85	66–102	75–77	86–84	86–83	65–99	—	76–98	91–86	76–93	86–78
Partizan Mozzart Bet	101–56	96–83	110–102	96–67	98–87	88–57	89–91	96–76	112–80	110–78	—	99–76	67–74	113–74
SC Derby	86–84	80–93	82–78	93–101	77–91	94–85	81–90	84–70	89–82	94–79	78–84	—	91–92	88–75
Split	75–61	75–81	93–85	76–83	73–92	78–66	90–95	78–74	88–73	87–75	53–76	72–76	—	75–82
Zadar	79–80	57–67	88–65	91–64	74–81	72–75	74–59	70–53	74–71	92–57	84–68	79–74	77–61	—

Source: ABA League
Legend: Blue = home team win; Red = away team win.
Matches with lighter background shading were decided after overtime.

=== Results by round ===
The table lists the results of teams in each round.

Win	Loss	Postponed

Team ╲ Round	1	2	3	4	5	6	7	8	9	10	11	12	13	14	15	16	17	18	19	20	21	22	23	24	25	26
(Serbia) Crvena zvezda Meridianbet	W	W	W	W	L	W	W	W	W	W	W	W	W	W	L	W	W	W	L	W	W	W	W	L	W	W
(Serbia) Partizan Mozzart Bet	W	W	W	L	W	W	L	L	W	W	W	W	L	W	W	W	W	L	L	W	W	W	W	W	W	W
(Montenegro) Budućnost VOLI	W	W	W	W	W	L	W	L	L	W	W	L	L	W	W	W	W	W	W	W	W	W	W	L	L	W
(Serbia) Mega MIS	L	L	W	W	L	W	W	L	W	L	L	L	W	W	W	W	L	L	L	W	W	W	W	W	W	W
(Slovenia) Cedevita Olimpija	W	L	W	L	W	W	W	W	W	L	W	W	W	L	W	L	W	L	W	W	L	L	L	W	L	W
(Croatia) Zadar	L	L	W	W	W	L	L	W	L	W	L	W	W	L	W	L	W	W	W	L	W	W	W	L	L	L
(Bosnia and Herzegovina) Igokea m:tel	L	W	W	W	W	L	W	W	W	W	W	L	L	L	L	W	L	W	L	L	L	L	L	W	W	L
(Montenegro) SC Derby	W	W	L	W	L	W	L	L	W	W	L	L	W	L	L	L	L	W	W	W	L	W	L	L	L	L
(Croatia) Split	L	L	L	W	L	L	L	L	W	W	L	W	L	W	W	W	L	W	W	L	L	W	W	L	L	L
(Serbia) Borac Mozzart	W	W	L	L	L	L	W	W	L	L	W	W	L	W	L	L	W	L	L	L	L	L	L	W	L	W
(Serbia) FMP Soccerbet	L	W	L	L	W	W	L	L	L	L	L	L	W	W	L	L	L	L	W	L	W	L	L	W	W	W
(Croatia) Cibona	L	L	L	L	L	W	W	W	L	L	W	W	L	L	W	L	L	L	L	W	W	L	L	W	L	L
(Montenegro) Mornar Barsko zlato	L	L	L	L	W	L	L	L	L	L	L	L	L	L	L	W	W	L	W	L	L	L	W	L	W	L
(Slovenia) Krka	W	L	L	L	L	L	L	W	L	L	L	L	W	L	L	L	L	W	L	L	L	L	L	L	W	L

Source: ABA League

== Playoffs ==
As in the previous season, top 8 teams advanced to playoffs, quarterfinals and semifinals were played in best-of-3 series, while finals were played in best-of-5 series.

=== Bracket ===
Quarter-finals
(Serbia) Crvena zvezda Meridianbet	2
(Montenegro) SC Derby	0
(Serbia) Mega MIS	2
(Slovenia) Cedevita Olimpija	0
(Serbia) Partizan Mozzart Bet	2
(Bosnia and Herzegovina) Igokea m:tel	0
(Montenegro) Budućnost VOLI	2
(Croatia) Zadar	0

Semi-finals
(Serbia) Crvena zvezda Meridianbet	2
(Serbia) Mega MIS	0
(Serbia) Partizan Mozzart Bet	2
(Montenegro) Budućnost VOLI	1

Final
(Serbia) Crvena zvezda Meridianbet	3
(Serbia) Partizan Mozzart Bet	0

=== Quarterfinals ===
Team 1	Series	Team 2	Game 1	Game 2	Game 3
Crvena zvezda Meridianbet (Serbia)	2–0	(Montenegro) SC Derby	83–81	92–77	—
Mega MIS (Serbia)	2–0	(Slovenia) Cedevita Olimpija	119–98	85–71	—
Partizan Mozzart Bet (Serbia)	2–0	(Bosnia and Herzegovina) Igokea m:tel	94–85	101–80	—
Budućnost VOLI (Montenegro)	2–0	(Croatia) Zadar	100–69	80–73	—

=== Semifinals ===
Team 1	Series	Team 2	Game 1	Game 2	Game 3
Crvena zvezda Meridianbet (Serbia)	2–0	(Serbia) Mega MIS	103–73	94–69	—
Partizan Mozzart Bet (Serbia)	2–1	(Montenegro) Budućnost VOLI	78–67	73–74	100–86

=== Finals ===
Team 1	Series	Team 2	Game 1	Game 2	Game 3	Game 4	Game 5
Crvena zvezda Meridianbet (Serbia)	3–0	(Serbia) Partizan Mozzart Bet	85–82	80–73	82–76	—	—

=== Game 1 ===
13 May 2024	Crvena zvezda Meridianbet	85–82	Partizan Mozzart Bet
20:30	Scoring by quarter: 17–20, 22–19, 25–22, 21–21
	Pts: Yago 18; Rebs: Davidovac 7 Asts: Yago 6	Boxscore	Pts: Nunnally 27; Rebs: LeDay 8 Asts: Smith 3	Arena: Aleksandar Nikolić Hall; Referees: Pukl; Jovčić; Kardum

=== Game 2 ===
15 May 2024	Crvena zvezda Meridianbet	80–73	Partizan Mozzart Bet
19:30	Scoring by quarter: 17–19, 21–19, 23–19, 19–16
	Pts: Nedović 21; Rebs: Yago 5 Asts: Teodosić 7	Boxscore	Pts: Smith 12; Rebs: Caboclo 6 Nunnally 6 Asts: Dozier 3	Arena: Aleksandar Nikolić Hall; Referees: Javor; Obrknežević; Koljenšić

=== Game 3 ===
19 May 2024	Partizan Mozzart Bet	76–82	Crvena zvezda Meridianbet
20:30	Scoring by quarter: 18–20, 20–22, 14–17, 24–23
	Pts: Avramović 17; Rebs: Dozier 6 Asts: Dozier 6	Boxscore	Pts: Giedraitis 12; Mitrović 12; Rebs: Mitrović 8 Asts: Teodosić 6	Arena: Belgrade Arena; Referees: Nikolić; Nedović; Radojković

== Relegation Playoffs ==
The 13th placed team of the First Division season and the runners-up of the Second Division season should play in the Qualifiers for a spot in the next First Division season. However, board meeting of ABA league in April decided that no team would be relegated this season.

== MVP List ==
=== MVP of the Round ===
Round	Player	Team	PIR
1	(Slovenia) Jurij Macura	(Slovenia) Krka	31
2	(Bosnia and Herzegovina) Kenan Kamenjaš	(Montenegro) SC Derby	31
3	(Croatia) Luka Božić	(Croatia) Zadar	39
4	(Croatia) Luka Božić (2)	(Croatia) Zadar (2)	29
5	(Croatia) Luka Božić (3)	(Croatia) Zadar (3)	43
6	(Serbia) Nikola Topić	(Serbia) Mega MIS	41
7	(Slovenia) Jaka Blažič	(Slovenia) Cedevita Olimpija	31
8	(Croatia) Luka Božić (4)	(Croatia) Zadar (4)	48
9	(Croatia) Lovre Runjić	(Croatia) Split	35
10	(Croatia) Luka Božić (5)	(Croatia) Zadar (5)	35
11	(Serbia) Nemanja Nedović	(Serbia) Crvena zvezda Meridianbet	32
12	(Croatia) Luka Božić (6)	(Croatia) Zadar (6)	44
13	(Croatia) Luka Božić (7)	(Croatia) Zadar (7)	38
14	(Serbia) Stefan Miljenović	(Serbia) Mega MIS (2)	43
15	(Montenegro) Vladimir Mihailović	(Montenegro) Budućnost VOLI	33
16	(Serbia) Uroš Luković	(Montenegro) Mornar Barsko zlato	32
17	(United States) Tavian Dunn-Martin	(Montenegro) Mornar Barsko zlato (2)	31
18	(Croatia) Mateo Drežnjak	(Montenegro) SC Derby (2)	37
19	(Croatia) Luka Božić (8)	(Croatia) Zadar (8)	35
20	(Serbia) Stefan Miljenović (2)	(Serbia) Mega MIS (3)	31
21	(Serbia) Uroš Plavšić	(Serbia) Mega MIS (4)	35
22	(Brazil) Yago dos Santos	(Serbia) Crvena zvezda Meridianbet (2)	40
23	(Croatia) Luka Božić (9)	(Croatia) Zadar (9)	34
24	(Slovenia) Jaka Blažič (2)	(Slovenia) Cedevita Olimpija (2)	37
25	(Serbia) Stefan Miljenović (3)	(Serbia) Mega MIS (5)	34
26	(Serbia) Uroš Plavšić (2)	(Serbia) Mega MIS (6)	36
QF1	(Serbia) Nikola Đurišić	(Serbia) Mega MIS (7)	38
QF2	(Bosnia and Herzegovina) Kenan Kamenjaš (2)	(Montenegro) Budućnost VOLI (2)	29
SF1	(Serbia) Aleksa Avramović	(Serbia) Partizan Mozzart Bet	19
SF2	(United States) Freddie Gillespie	(Serbia) Crvena zvezda Meridianbet (3)	24
SF3	(United States) James Nunnally	(Serbia) Partizan Mozzart Bet (2)	27
F1	(Brazil) Yago dos Santos (2)	(Serbia) Crvena zvezda Meridianbet (4)	21
F2	(Serbia) Nemanja Nedović (2)	(Serbia) Crvena zvezda Meridianbet (5)	20
F3	(Serbia) Luka Mitrović	(Serbia) Crvena zvezda Meridianbet (6)	23

Source: ABA League

=== MVP of the Month ===
Month	Player	Team	Ref.
2023
October	(Croatia) Luka Božić	(Croatia) Zadar	
November	(Croatia) Karlo Matković	(Slovenia) Cedevita Olimpija	
December	(Croatia) Luka Božić (2)	(Croatia) Zadar (2)	
2024
January	(United States) Shannon Shorter	(Croatia) Split	
February	(United States) Marcus Weathers	(Montenegro) Mornar Bar	
March	(Croatia) Luka Božić (3)	(Croatia) Zadar (3)	

== Awards ==
Pos.	Player	Team	Ref.
MVP
SF	(Croatia) Luka Božić	(Croatia) Zadar	
Finals MVP
PG	(Brazil) Yago dos Santos	(Serbia) Crvena zvezda Meridianbet	
Top Scorer
SF	(Croatia) Luka Božić	(Croatia) Zadar	
Best Defensive Player
SG	(Serbia) Branko Lazić	(Serbia) Crvena zvezda Meridianbet	
Top Prospect
PG	(Serbia) Nikola Topić	(Serbia) Mega MIS / (Serbia) Crvena zvezda Meridianbet	
Coach of the Season
HC	(Croatia) Danijel Jusup	(Croatia) Zadar	
The Ideal Starting Five
PG	(Serbia) Nikola Topić	(Serbia) Mega MIS / (Serbia) Crvena zvezda Meridianbet	
SG	(Serbia) Miloš Teodosić	(Serbia) Crvena zvezda Meridianbet	
SF	(Croatia) Luka Božić	(Croatia) Zadar	
PF	(United States) Zach LeDay	(Serbia) Partizan	
C	(Bosnia and Herzegovina) Kenan Kamenjaš	(Montenegro) SC Derby / (Montenegro) Budućnost VOLI	

== Clubs in European competitions ==
Competition	Team	Progress	Result
EuroLeague	(Basketball Federation of Serbia) Partizan Mozzart Bet	Regular season	11th (16–18)
EuroLeague	(Basketball Federation of Serbia) Crvena zvezda Meridianbet	Regular season	16th (11–23)
EuroCup	(Basketball Federation of Slovenia) Cedevita Olimpija	Regular season Group A	10th (1–17)
EuroCup	(Basketball Federation of Montenegro) Budućnost VOLI	Regular season Group B	7th (8–10)
Champions League	(Basketball Federation of Bosnia and Herzegovina) Igokea m:tel	Regular season Group H	4th (0–6)
Champions League	(Basketball Federation of Serbia) FMP Meridian	Qualification Group II Quarter-finals	Eliminated by (Italian Basketball Federation) Openjobmetis Varese, 71–73
Champions League	(Basketball Federation of Montenegro) Mornar Barsko zlato	Qualification Group III Quarter-finals	Eliminated by (Spanish Basketball Federation) Monbus Obradoiro, 56–90
FIBA Europe Cup	(Basketball Federation of Montenegro) Mornar Barsko zlato	Regular season Group D	4th (1–5)

== See also ==
- List of current ABA League First Division team rosters
- 2023–24 ABA League Second Division
