= Uroš Plavšić =

Serbian basketball player (born 1998)

Uroš Plavšić Урош Плавшић
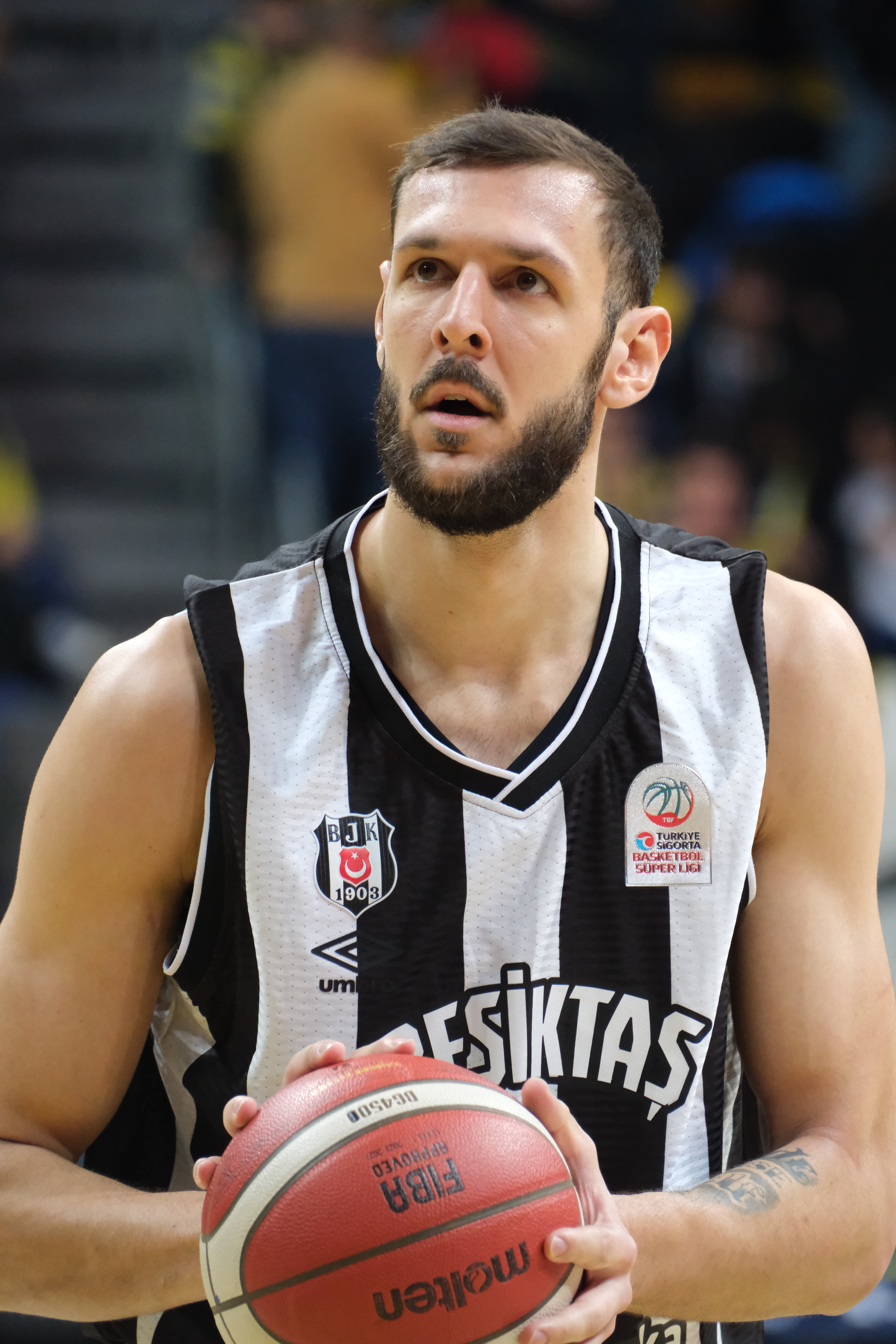
- Plavšić with Beşiktaş in 2025

No. 22 – U-BT Cluj-Napoca
- Position: Center
- League: Liga Națională; ABA League; EuroCup

Personal information
- Born: 22 December 1998 (age 27) Čačak, FR Yugoslavia
- Listed height: 7 ft 1 in (2.16 m)
- Listed weight: 265 lb (120 kg)

Career information
- High school: Hamilton Heights Christian Academy (Chattanooga, Tennessee)
- College: Tennessee (2019–2023)
- NBA draft: 2023: undrafted
- Playing career: 2016–present

Career history
- 2016–2017: Smederevo
- 2023–2024: Mega Basket
- 2024–2026: Crvena zvezda
- 2024–2025: →Beşiktaş
- 2026: →Bandırma Bordo
- 2026–present: U-BT Cluj-Napoca
Medals
Men's basketball
Representing Serbia
Olympic Games
Bronze medal – third place	2024 Paris	Team

Uroš Plavšić (Serbian Cyrillic: Урош Плавшић; born 22 December 1998) is a Serbian professional basketball player for U-BT Cluj-Napoca of the Romanian Liga Națională (LNBM), the ABA League, and the EuroCup. He also represents the Serbian national team. He played college basketball for the Tennessee Volunteers.

== Early career ==
Plavšić was born in Čačak, Serbia, FR Yugoslavia on 28 December 1998. He grew up in his hometown of Ivanjica. Plavšić played for Mega Basket junior team and was included in their senior roster in the mid season of 2015-16. He made his professional debut for Smederevo of the Basketball League of Serbia (KLS) in the 2016-17 season and averaged 4.5 points, 2.4 rebounds and 0.5 assists per game and was a teammate to future NBA player Goga Bitadze.

== High school career ==
In October 2017, Plavšić moved to Chattanooga and enrolled to Hamilton Heights Christian Academy, where he played his senior year, averaging 9.6 points and 7.5 rebounds per game.

== College career ==
Plavšić initially verbally committed to Cleveland State Vikings but later switched his commitment to Arizona State Sun Devils. He redshirted his freshman year. In 2019, he committed to and transferred to Tennessee Volunteers. In his senior year, Plavšić averaged 4.9 points and 3.4 rebounds per game. Plavšić was known as a trash-talker on the court.

== Professional career ==
After going undrafted in the 2023 NBA draft, Plavšić was named a member of the 2023 NBA Summer League Atlanta Hawks squad.

In August 2023, Plavšić signed a deal with Mega Basket of the ABA League and the Basketball League of Serbia (KLS). Over the season, Plavšić in 27 ABA League games averaged 15.4 points and 7.7 rebounds on 65.6% shooting from the field.

In June 2024, Plavšić signed a deal with Crvena Zvezda.

On 27 December 2024, he was loaned to Beşiktaş of the Basketbol Süper Ligi (BSL). In 17 games played for Beşiktaş in the Basketbol Süper Ligi, Plavšić averaged 6.6 points and 4.7 rebounds on 59.2% shooting from the field.

On July 12, 2026, Plavšić signed with U-BT Cluj-Napoca of the Romanian Liga Națională (LNBM), the ABA League, and the EuroCup.

== National team career ==
Plavšić's play with Mega Basket got him a training camp invite for the Serbian national team ahead of the 2024 Summer Olympics in Paris. On 5 July 2024, Plavšić scored 19 points in a win against Netherlands. He was later confirmed as one of the 12 players which will represent Serbia at the Olympic Games. He won the bronze medal at the 2024 Summer Olympics with Serbia.

== Career statistics ==
Legend
GP	Games played	GS	Games started	MPG	Minutes per game
FG%	Field-goal percentage	3P%	3-point field-goal percentage	FT%	Free-throw percentage
RPG	Rebounds per game	APG	Assists per game	SPG	Steals per game
BPG	Blocks per game	PPG	Points per game	PIR	Performance index rating
**Bold**	Career high

=== EuroLeague ===
Year	Team	GP	GS	MPG	FG%	3P%	FT%	RPG	APG	SPG	BPG	PPG	PIR
2024–25	Crvena zvezda	10	6	11.4	.511	.000	.462	2.7	.3	.5	.2	5.2	4.4
**Career**		10	6	11.4	.511	.000	.462	2.7	.3	.5	.2	5.2	4.4

=== College ===
Year	Team	GP	GS	MPG	FG%	3P%	FT%	RPG	APG	SPG	BPG	PPG
2019–20	Tennessee	16	3	7.3	.421	.000	**.667**	.9	.2	.2	.0	2.6
2020–21	Tennessee	16	1	4.4	.467	.000	.400	1.1	.3	.1	.2	1.1
2021–22	Tennessee	**35**	**21**	**14.1**	.573	.000	.556	**4.0**	.5	**.4**	.2	4.2
2022–23	Tennessee	34	20	13.6	**.636**	.000	.340	3.4	**.7**	**.4**	**.3**	**4.9**
**Career**		101	45	11.3	.573	.000	.470	2.8	.5	.3	.2	3.7

=== Adriatic League ===
Year	Team	GP	GS	MPG	FG%	3P%	FT%	RPG	APG	SPG	BPG	PPG	PIR
2023–24	Mega Basket	27	27	24.3	.656	.200	.630	7.7	1.4	.5	.6	15.4	18.2

== Personal life ==
Prior to moving to the United States, Plavšić didn't speak English. He enjoys listening to Serbian rap music. His hobby is photography. He is in a relationship with an influencer Jovana Tomić.
