= Ioannis Sfairopoulos =

Greek professional basketball coach (born 1967)

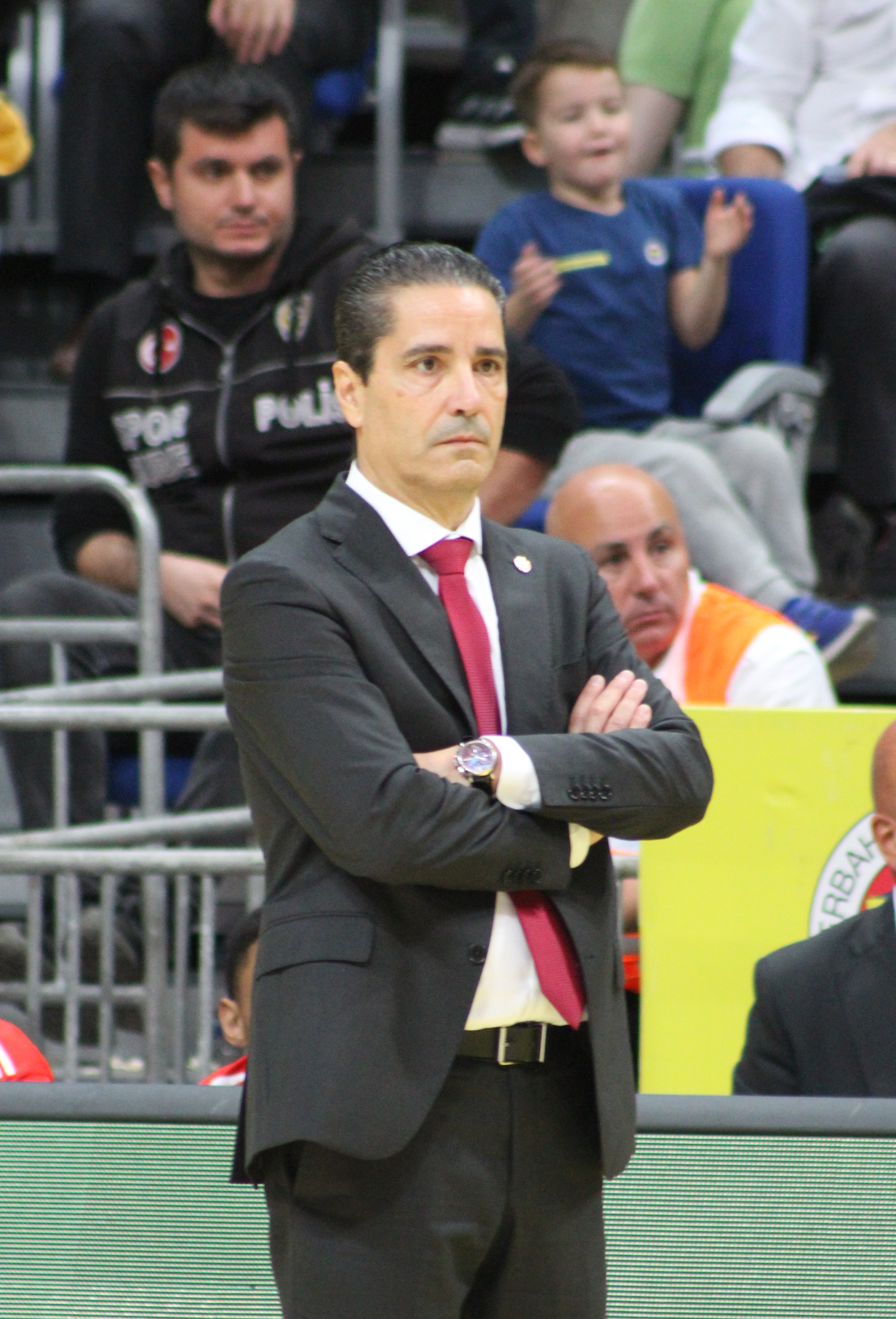
- Sfairopoulos in 2024

Personal information
- Born: March 21, 1967 (age 59) Thessaloniki, Greece

Career information
- Playing career: 1985–1988
- Position: Point guard
- Coaching career: 1986–present

Career history

Playing
- 1985–1988: Apollon Kalamarias

Coaching
- 1986–1994: Apollon Kalamarias (youth)
- 1994–1997: Apollon Kalamarias
- 1997–2005: PAOK (assistant)
- 2005–2008: Olympiacos (assistant)
- 2008–2011: Kolossos Rodou
- 2011–2012: CSKA Moscow (assistant)
- 2012: Houston Rockets (assistant)
- 2012–2014: Panionios
- 2014–2018: Olympiacos
- 2018–2022: Maccabi Tel Aviv
- 2023–2025: Crvena zvezda

Career highlights
- As head coach: ABA League champion (2024); 2× Greek League champion (2015, 2016); 3× Israeli League champion (2019–2021); Serbian League champion (2024); 2× Serbian Cup winner (2024, 2025); Israeli Cup winner (2021); 2× Israeli League Cup winner (2020, 2021); Greek League Coach of the Year (2015); 2× Israeli League Coach of the Year (2019, 2020)

Ioannis Sfairopoulos (alternate spellings: Giannis, Yiannis, Yannis, Sferopoulos) (Greek: Γιάννης Σφαιρόπουλος; born March 21, 1967) is a Greek professional basketball coach who last served as the head coach for Crvena zvezda of the Basketball League of Serbia (KLS), the Adriatic League and the EuroLeague.

== Playing career ==
Sfairopoulos began playing basketball in the youth system of Apollon Kalamarias at the age of 12. After playing 2 years in the Greek 2nd Division, with the senior men's team of Apollon Kalamarias, as a player-coach, he retired from playing club basketball, at the age of 21, to become to a full-time basketball coach.

== Coaching career ==
=== Clubs ===
After Sfairopoulos retired from playing club basketball, at the age of 21, he immediately began his basketball coaching career, within the same Apollon Kalamarias club system in which he was a player. He worked as a coach with the club, from 1986 to 1997. He coached in the club's cadets, juniors, and senior men's teams. He coached the Apollon Kalamarias senior men's team, which he took over in 1994, in both the Greek 4th Division, and the Greek 3rd Division.

He was then an assistant coach with the Greek Basket League club PAOK, from 1997 to 2005, and also was PAOK's head coach during the 2000–01 season. He then worked as an assistant head coach with Olympiacos, from 2005 to 2008, under head coaches Pini Gershon and Panagiotis Giannakis.

In 2006, he worked as an assistant coach with the NBA club Cleveland Cavaliers' NBA Summer League team. From 2008 to 2011, he was the head coach of Kolossos. In 2011, he became an assistant coach with the Russian League club CSKA Moscow, under head coach Jonas Kazlauskas. He then worked briefly as an assistant coach of the NBA's Houston Rockets.

He became the head coach of the Greek EuroCup team Panionios in 2012. He became the head coach of the Greek EuroLeague team Olympiacos in 2014. In 2015, he extended his contract with Olympiacos, through the 2017–18 season. After Olympiacos lost to Panathinaikos in the 2018 Greek League Finals, 3 games to 2, Olympiacos announced that Sfairopoulos and the club would separate ways.

On November 18, 2018, Sfairopoulos was hired as Maccabi Tel Aviv's new head coach, as he signed a 1 1/2-year deal with the Israeli Premier League team. On June 13, 2019, Sfairopoulos led Maccabi to their 53rd Israeli League title after defeating Maccabi Rishon LeZion 89–75 in the final. He was subsequently named Israeli League Coach of the Year.

On December 15, 2019, Sfairopoulos signed a three-year contract extension with Maccabi. On February 15, 2022, Sfairopoulos was fired from the head coach position, after a loss in the Israeli Cup semifinals, which led to public discontent, as well as a disappointing EuroLeague campaign.

On October 22, 2023, he became the new head coach of Crvena zvezda and signed a two-year contract with this club. He won the triple crown in 2024. On March 14, 2025, Giannis Sfairopoulos received several messages of disrespect after purposely (and politicaly) mistaking Serbian student protest slang “Pumpaj” with “Dubai”. On October 9, 2025, he parted ways with the Serbian club after two consecutive losses.

=== Greece national team ===
Sfairopoulos was an assistant coach with the Greece men's national basketball team from 2001 to 2004, under head coaches Kostas Petropoulos, Giannis Ioannidis, and Panagiotis Giannakis. He was an assistant coach on the Greece national team that competed at the 2004 Summer Olympics. He also worked as assistant coach for the Greece national team from 2009 to 2010, under head coach Jonas Kazlauskas.

He was an assistant coach with Greece at the EuroBasket 2009, and the 2010 FIBA World Championship.

== Coaching record ==
Legend
G	Games coached	W	Games won	L	Games lost	W–L %	Win-loss %

Note: The EuroLeague is not the only competition in which the team played during the season. He also coached in domestic competition, and regional competition if applicable.

=== EuroLeague ===
Team	Year	G	W	L	W–L%	Result
Olympiacos	2014–15	26	18	8	.692	Lost in the final game
Olympiacos	2015–16	24	14	10	.583	Eliminated in the Top 16 stage
Olympiacos	2016–17	37	23	14	.622	Lost in the final game
Olympiacos	2017–18	34	20	14	.588	Eliminated in the quarterfinals
Maccabi Tel Aviv	2018–19	23	13	10	.565	Eliminated in the regular season
Maccabi Tel Aviv	2019–20	28	19	9	.679	Cancelled due to Covid-19 pandemic
Maccabi Tel Aviv	2020–21	34	14	20	.412	Eliminated in the regular season
Maccabi Tel Aviv	2021–22	23	11	12	.478	Fired
Crvena Zvezda	2023–24	30	10	20	.333	Eliminated in the regular season
Crvena Zvezda	2024–25	35	18	17	.514	Eliminated in the play-in tournament
Crvena Zvezda	2025–26	2	0	2	.000	Fired
Career		229	143	86	.576	

== Awards and accomplishments ==
=== Greece national team ===
- EuroBasket 2009: Bronze

=== Pro clubs ===
- Greek Cup Winner: (1999)
- VTB United League Champion: (2012)
- Russian Championship Champion: (2012)

=== Pro clubs ===
- 2× EuroLeague Runner-up: (2015, 2017)
- 2× Greek League Champion: (2015, 2016)
- 1× Greek League Best Coach: (2015)
- 3× Israeli League Champion: (2019, 2020, 2021)
- 1× Israeli Cup Winner: (2021)
- 2× Israeli League Best Coach: (2019, 2020)
- 2× Israeli Basketball League Cup (2020, 2021)
- 1× ABA League Champion (2024)
- 1× Serbian League Champion (2024)
- 2× Serbian Cup Winner (2024, 2025)

== Personal life ==
Sfairopoulos is married and is the father of two sons.
