= PJ Dozier =

American basketball player (born 1996)

- Dozier with Anadolu Efes in 2026

No. 15 – Anadolu Efes
- Position: Shooting guard
- League: BSL; EuroLeague

Personal information
- Born: October 25, 1996 (age 30) Columbia, South Carolina, U.S.
- Listed height: 2.00 m (6 ft 7 in)
- Listed weight: 206 lb (93 kg)

Career information
- High school: Spring Valley (Columbia, South Carolina)
- College: South Carolina (2015–2017)
- NBA draft: 2017: undrafted
- Playing career: 2017–present

Career history
- 2017–2018: Oklahoma City Thunder
- 2017–2018: →Oklahoma City Blue
- 2018–2019: Boston Celtics
- 2018–2019: →Maine Red Claws
- 2019–2022: Denver Nuggets
- 2019–2020: →Windy City Bulls
- 2022–2023: Iowa Wolves
- 2023: Sacramento Kings
- 2023: Iowa Wolves
- 2023: Sacramento Kings
- 2023–2024: Partizan
- 2024: Minnesota Timberwolves
- 2025–present: Anadolu Efes

Career highlights
- VTB United League Supercup winner (2026); All-NBA G League Third Team (2019); McDonald's All-American (2015); South Carolina Mr. Basketball (2015)
- Stats at NBA.com
- Stats at Basketball Reference

Perry Linnard "PJ" Dozier Jr. (born October 25, 1996) is an American professional basketball player for Anadolu Efes of the Turkish Basketbol Süper Ligi (BSL) and the EuroLeague. He played college basketball for the South Carolina Gamecocks.

== College career ==
In his senior season at Spring Valley High School, he was named to the 2015 McDonald's All-American Boys Game roster and scored 14 points. He committed to South Carolina. ESPN ranked him the 21st best recruit in his class. His father, Perry Dozier, was a basketball player for South Carolina in the 1980s.

In his sophomore season, along with guard Sindarius Thornwell, Dozier was an important part of South Carolina's improbable Final Four appearance. He scored 21 points against Marquette in the NCAA Tournament. Dozier was named to the East Region All-Tournament Team. In the 77–73 loss to Gonzaga in the Final Four, Dozier had 17 points. At the conclusion of his sophomore season, Dozier announced his intention to forgo his final two seasons of collegiate eligibility and declare for the 2017 NBA draft.

== Professional career ==
=== Oklahoma City Thunder (2017–2018) ===
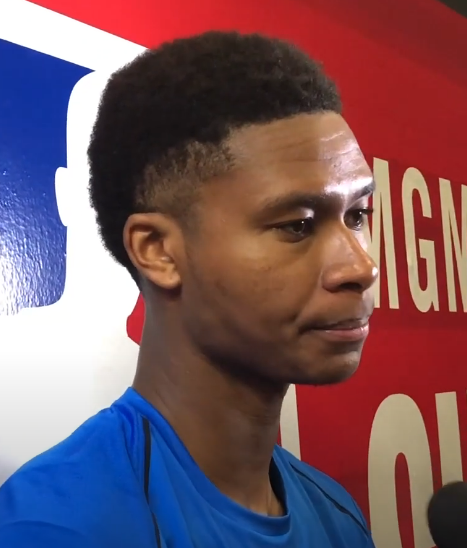
Dozier at the 2018 NBA Summer League.

After going undrafted in 2017 NBA draft, Dozier signed with the Los Angeles Lakers for the 2017 NBA Summer League. He signed a contract with the Dallas Mavericks on August 8, 2017. He was released on October 14, 2017, before agreeing to a two-way contract with the Oklahoma City Thunder two days later. Under the terms of the deal, Dozier split time between the Thunder and their NBA G League affiliate, the Oklahoma City Blue. Dozier would make his NBA debut on February 8, 2018, in a loss to the Los Angeles Lakers.

=== Boston Celtics (2018–2019) ===
On August 21, 2018, Dozier signed a two-way contract with the Boston Celtics. In February 2019, Dozier was named to the All-NBA G League team, the equivalent of All-Star. On June 30, 2019, the Celtics declined to extend his contract, thus making him an unrestricted free agent.

On July 4, Dozier was included in the Philadelphia 76ers' Summer League team.

=== Denver Nuggets (2019–2022) ===
On August 13, 2019, Dozier signed a one-year contract with the Denver Nuggets. He was assigned to the Windy City Bulls for the start of the NBA G League season. On January 11, 2020, Dozier had a game-high 32 points, nine assists, eight rebounds, two steals and one block in a 120–112 win over the Fort Wayne Mad Ants. In his Denver debut on January 15, Dozier finished with 12 points as he filled in for the injured Jamal Murray. On June 30, the Denver Nuggets converted his two-way contract to a multi-year NBA contract.

On November 23, 2021, during a 100–119 loss to the Portland Trail Blazers, Dozier tore his left ACL. The next day, it was confirmed that the tear was a season-ending injury.

On January 19, 2022, Dozier was traded to the Boston Celtics in a three-team trade involving the San Antonio Spurs. On February 10, 2022, Dozier was traded to the Orlando Magic, without appearing in a game for the Celtics. He was waived by the Magic following the trade.

=== Iowa Wolves (2022–2023) ===
On September 17, 2022, Dozier signed with the Minnesota Timberwolves. On November 2, 2022, Dozier was named to the opening night roster for the Iowa Wolves.

=== Sacramento Kings (2023) ===
On January 9, 2023, the Sacramento Kings signed Dozier to a 10-day contract. On January 19, 2023, the Kings re-signed Dozier to a second 10-day contract. After his contract expired, the Kings opted not to re-sign him, instead signing Deonte Burton to a 10-day contract.

=== Return to Iowa (2023) ===
On January 29, 2023, Dozier was reacquired by the Iowa Wolves.

=== Return to Sacramento (2023) ===
On February 25, 2023, Dozier was reacquired by the Sacramento Kings.

=== Partizan Belgrade (2023–2024) ===
On August 12, 2023, Dozier signed a one-year deal with Partizan Mozzart Bet of the Basketball League of Serbia (KLS), the Adriatic League and the EuroLeague. In his first season with the club, he averaged 9.2 points, 3 rebounds and 3.1 assists over 33 EuroLeague games.

=== Minnesota Timberwolves (2024) ===
On July 15, 2024, Dozier signed with the Minnesota Timberwolves. However, he was waived on December 28, after nine appearances.

=== Anadolu Efes (2025–present) ===
On January 12, 2025, Dozier signed with Anadolu Efes of the Basketbol Süper Ligi (BSL). On June 12, Dozier's contract was extended through 2027 by the club. On November 10, 2025, Dozier suffered a right hamstring tear.

== Career statistics ==
Legend
GP	Games played	GS	Games started	MPG	Minutes per game
FG%	Field-goal percentage	3P%	3-point field-goal percentage	FT%	Free-throw percentage
RPG	Rebounds per game	APG	Assists per game	SPG	Steals per game
BPG	Blocks per game	PPG	Points per game	PIR	Performance index rating
**Bold**	Career high

=== NBA ===
==== Regular season ====
Year	Team	GP	GS	MPG	FG%	3P%	FT%	RPG	APG	SPG	BPG	PPG
2017–18	Oklahoma City	2	0	1.6	.500	—	—	.5	.0	.0	.0	1.0
2018–19	Boston	6	0	8.5	.381	.250	.500	2.8	.8	.3	.0	3.2
2019–20	Denver	29	0	14.2	.414	.347	.724	1.9	**2.2**	.5	.2	5.8
2020–21	Denver	**50**	**6**	**21.8**	.417	.315	.636	**3.6**	1.8	**.6**	**.4**	**7.7**
2021–22	Denver	18	0	18.9	.364	.313	**.769**	3.5	1.6	**.6**	.3	5.4
2022–23	Sacramento	16	0	5.0	.303	.125	—	.9	.6	.4	.1	1.4
2024–25	Minnesota	9	0	3.9	**.667**	**.667**	.167	.6	.6	.1	.0	.8
Career		130	6	15.5	.403	.311	.647	2.6	1.6	.5	.3	5.4

==== Playoffs ====
Year	Team	GP	GS	MPG	FG%	3P%	FT%	RPG	APG	SPG	BPG	PPG
2020	Denver	**12**	0	**10.4**	.424	.250	.571	**1.5**	**1.0**	**.2**	**.2**	**3.2**
2023	Sacramento	3	0	2.0	**.500**	**.500**	–	.7	—	—	—	2.7
Career		15	0	8.7	.436	.333	.571	1.3	.8	.1	.1	3.1

=== EuroLeague ===
Year	Team	GP	GS	MPG	FG%	3P%	FT%	RPG	APG	SPG	BPG	PPG	PIR
2023–24	Partizan	33	22	21.0	.486	.294	.733	3.0	3.1	1.3	.2	9.2	9.9
Career		33	22	21.0	.486	.294	.733	3.0	3.1	1.3	.2	9.2	9.9

=== Domestic leagues ===
Year	Team	League	GP	MPG	FG%	3P%	FT%	RPG	APG	SPG	BPG	PPG
2017–18	(United States) Oklahoma City Blue	G League	43	28.4	.465	.340	.653	5.6	2.7	1.3	.2	12.9
2018–19	(United States) Maine Red Claws	G League	46	35.3	.456	.311	.668	6.6	6.7	1.2	.6	21.1
2019–20	(United States) Windy City Bulls	G League	18	36.9	.434	.330	.741	7.7	7.3	1.6	.7	21.2
2022–23	(United States) Iowa Wolves	G League	11	33.1	.451	.375	.647	5.8	4.0	1.4	.6	20.4
2023–24	(Serbia) Partizan	ABA	27	17.1	.509	.304	.789	2.7	3.1	.7	.3	7.7

=== College ===
Year	Team	GP	GS	MPG	FG%	3P%	FT%	RPG	APG	SPG	BPG	PPG
2015–16	South Carolina	34	28	19.0	.381	.213	.544	3.0	2.1	1.0	**.4**	6.7
2016–17	South Carolina	**36**	**36**	**28.7**	**.407**	**.298**	**.597**	**4.8**	**2.8**	**1.7**	.3	**13.9**
Career		70	64	24.0	.398	.277	.579	3.9	2.4	1.3	.3	10.4

== Personal life ==
Dozier is a second cousin of the late Reggie Lewis, a former Celtics player who died as a result of heart failure. While a member of the Oklahoma City Thunder, Dozier wore the jersey number #35 as a tribute to Lewis. Dozier's uncle, Terry Dozier, played for the Charlotte Hornets of the NBA.

Dozier's father, Perry, and his uncle, Terry, played basketball at South Carolina. Perry Sr and Terry are twins. His older sister Asia also played basketball at South Carolina.
