= Nikola Topić =

Serbian basketball player (born 2005)

Nikola Topić Никола Топић
No. 44 – Oklahoma City Thunder
- Position: Point guard
- League: NBA

Personal information
- Born: 10 August 2005 (age 21) Novi Sad, Serbia and Montenegro
- Listed height: 6 ft 6 in (1.98 m)
- Listed weight: 200 lb (91 kg)

Career information
- NBA draft: 2024: 1st round, 12th overall pick
- Drafted by: Oklahoma City Thunder
- Playing career: 2022–present

Career history
- 2022–2024: Crvena zvezda
- 2022: →Slodes
- 2023: →OKK Beograd
- 2023: →Mega
- 2024–present: Oklahoma City Thunder
- 2026: →Oklahoma City Blue

Career highlights
- NBA champion (2025); 2× ABA League champion (2022, 2024); Serbian League champion (2024); Serbian Cup winner (2024); ABA League Top Prospect (2024); All-ABA League Team (2024); FIBA U18 European Championship MVP (2023)
- Stats at NBA.com
- Stats at Basketball Reference
Medals
Men's basketball
Representing Serbia
FIBA U18 European Championship
Gold medal – first place	2023 Serbia	Team

Nikola Topić (Serbian Cyrillic: Никола Топић, Serbian pronunciation: [nikola topitɕ], born 10 August 2005) is a Serbian professional basketball player for the Oklahoma City Thunder of the National Basketball Association (NBA). Standing at 6 ft 6 in (1.98 m), he plays at the point guard position. He missed his rookie season due to an ACL tear and the bulk of his sophomore season due to a battle with testicular cancer.

== Early career ==
Topić grew up playing basketball for KK Defense from his native Novi Sad from which he joined the Crvena zvezda youth system in June 2020.

== Professional career ==
=== Crvena zvezda (2022–2024) ===
On 28 March 2022, Topić made his professional debut for Crvena zvezda in an ABA League match against Slovenian side Krka at the age of 16. He scored 4 points and had 5 assists over 16 minutes of playing time. At 16 years, seven months and eighteen days of age, he became the youngest player in club history to score points for Crvena zvezda in the ABA League. On 1 April 2022, Topić made his EuroLeague debut in an 82–57 loss to Bayern Munich, becoming one of the youngest players to ever play in the EuroLeague at 16 years and 253 days of age.

==== 2022–23 season ====
At the start of the 2022–23 season, Topić was loaned to the Serbian team Slodes in September 2022. He returned to Crvena zvezda shortly after, and played with the team from October until December of the same year, during which in limited role he averaged 3.4 points over seven ABA League games.

On 9 January 2023, the ABA League declined and cancelled Topić's transfer to FMP Meridian. Eventually, he was loaned to OKK Beograd for the rest of the 2022–23 season. With OKK Beograd, he appeared in 19 games of the Serbian League, averaging 17.8 points on 55.2% shooting from the field, 5.3 assists and 3.8 rebounds per game.

==== 2023–24 season ====
On 17 July 2023, Topić signed his first professional contract with Crvena zvezda. At the start of the 2023–24 season, Topić was loaned to Serbian team Mega. He averaged 18.6 points, 6.9 assists and 3.7 rebounds over 13 games, before being loaned back to Crvena zvezda in December 2023. On 4 January 2024, he suffered a knee injury in a game against Partizan Belgrade.

On 10 April 2024, he won the ABA League Top Prospect award after securing more than half of the votes. He averaged 17.9 points, 6.8 assists and 3.6 rebounds when he won the award.

On 13 May 2024, Topić suffered a partially torn ACL in a game against Partizan Belgrade.

=== Oklahoma City Thunder (2024–present) ===
On 26 June 2024, Topić was selected with the twelfth overall pick by the Oklahoma City Thunder in the 2024 NBA draft. On 6 July, he signed with the Thunder. It was later announced that Topić was expected to miss the entirety of the 2024–25 season due to surgery on his torn ACL. Topić won his first NBA championship in 2025 despite not playing in a single game, becoming the third-youngest NBA player to win a title.

On 6 October 2025, it was announced that Topić would miss at least four to six weeks after undergoing a testicular procedure. On 30 October, Thunder general manager Sam Presti told reporters that the procedure Topić received at MD Anderson Cancer Center in Houston was a biopsy that confirmed a testicular cancer diagnosis, and that after receiving the results, Topić asked the Thunder to not publicly reveal his diagnosis until he had started chemotherapy treatments. Topić has been able to work out while beginning chemotherapy, but Presti said there is no timetable for him to make his NBA debut.

On 9 February 2026, Topić made his NBA G League debut with the Oklahoma City Blue while on assignment from the Thunder, his first game action since his diagnosis. On 12 February, he made his NBA debut with the Thunder in a home game against the Milwaukee Bucks. Topić made 10 appearances for Oklahoma City during his rookie campaign, recording averages of 5.2 points, 1.9 rebounds, and 4.4 assists.

On 13 June 2026, it was announced that Topić would require a lumbar microdiscectomy, with the expectation that he would be available for training camp.

== National team career ==
In August 2021, Topić was a member of the Serbian under-16 national team that participated at the FIBA U16 European Challengers in Novi Sad, Serbia. He played only one game, recording 17 points, 8 rebounds and 5 assists in an 83–52 win over the Czech Republic. He represented the Serbian national team in his debut on 16 August 2023 where Serbia played a friendly match against Puerto Rico.

== Career statistics ==
Legend
GP	Games played	GS	Games started	MPG	Minutes per game
FG%	Field-goal percentage	3P%	3-point field-goal percentage	FT%	Free-throw percentage
RPG	Rebounds per game	APG	Assists per game	SPG	Steals per game
BPG	Blocks per game	PPG	Points per game	PIR	Performance index rating
**Bold**	Career high

=== NBA ===
==== Regular season ====
Year	Team	GP	GS	MPG	FG%	3P%	FT%	RPG	APG	SPG	BPG	PPG
2025–26	Oklahoma City	10	2	16.0	.431	.400	.400	1.9	4.4	.5	.0	5.2
Career		10	2	16.0	.431	.400	.400	1.9	4.4	.5	.0	5.2

==== Playoffs ====
Year	Team	GP	GS	MPG	FG%	3P%	FT%	RPG	APG	SPG	BPG	PPG
2026	Oklahoma City	9	0	2.4	.333	.000	—	.2	.3	.2	.0	.4
Career		9	0	2.4	.333	.000	—	.2	.3	.2	.0	.4

=== EuroLeague ===
Year	Team	GP	GS	MPG	FG%	3P%	FT%	RPG	APG	SPG	BPG	PPG	PIR
2021–22	Crvena zvezda	1	0	2.0	.000	—	—	—	—	—	—	0.0	-1.0
2022–23	Crvena zvezda	**2**	0	4.0	.000	.000	—	1.0	.5	—	—	0.0	0.0
2023–24	Crvena zvezda	**2**	**2**	**15.0**	**.375**	.000	**1.000**	**1.5**	**3.5**	**.5**	—	**3.5**	**4.5**
Career		5	2	8.2	.273	.000	1.000	1.0	1.6	.2	—	1.4	1.6

=== Domestic leagues ===
Year	Team	League	GP	MPG	FG%	3P%	FT%	RPG	APG	SPG	BPG	PPG
2021–22	(Serbia) Crvena zvezda	ABA	2	11.5	.200	.000	1.000	1.0	3.0	1.5	—	2.0
2022–23	(Serbia) Crvena zvezda	ABA	7	8.0	.625	.250	1.000	1.0	.7	.3	—	3.4
2022–23	(Serbia) OKK Beograd	KLS	19	30.3	.552	.373	.853	3.8	5.3	1.5	—	17.8
2023–24	(Serbia) Mega	ABA	13	34.1	.524	.288	.850	3.7	6.9	.9	.1	18.6
2023–24	(Serbia) Crvena zvezda	ABA	5	15.7	.393	.333	1.000	1.8	3.2	.8	.2	6.0

== Personal life ==
Topić is the son of Milenko Topić, a Serbian basketball coach and former player. A power forward, Milenko spent most of his career in the YUBA League playing for Profikolor, BFC Beočin and Crvena zvezda, as well as Budućnost and Hemofarm. In later career, Milenko played in Italy and Greece. Milenko also represented the Yugoslavian national team internationally (representing FR Yugoslavia), with whom he won gold medals at the EuroBasket 1997 and the 1998 FIBA World Championship, a silver medal at the 1996 Summer Olympics, and a bronze at the EuroBasket 1999.

== See also ==
- List of father-and-son combinations who have played for Crvena zvezda
- List of Serbian NBA players
- List of youngest EuroLeague players
