= Jan Špan =

Slovenian basketball player

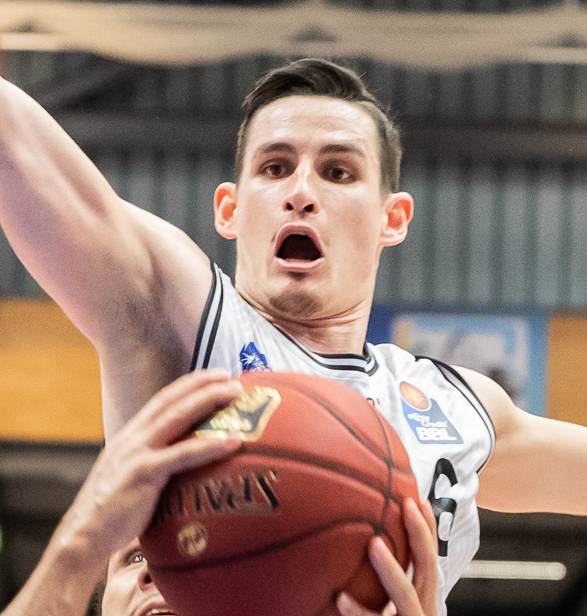
- Špan in 2019 with Crailsheim Merlins

Dubrava
- Position: Point guard
- League: Premijer liga

Personal information
- Born: November 20, 1992 (age 33) Ljubljana, Slovenia
- Listed height: 1.89 m (6 ft 2 in)

Career information
- NBA draft: 2014: undrafted
- Playing career: 2007–present

Career history
- 2007–2010: Litija
- 2010–2011: Union Olimpija
- 2011–2012: Maribor Messer
- 2012–2013: Slovan
- 2013–2014: Portorož
- 2015: Rakvere Tarvas
- 2015–2016: Šenčur
- 2016–2017: Zlatorog Laško
- 2017–2019: Petrol Olimpija
- 2019–2020: Crailsheim Merlins
- 2020–2021: Gipuzkoa
- 2021–2022: Larisa
- 2022–2026: Krka
- 2026–present: Dubrava

Career highlights
- Slovenian League champion (2018); Slovenian Cup winner (2011)

Jan Špan (born November 20, 1992) is a Slovenian professional basketball player for Dubrava of the Croatian Premijer liga. He is a 1.89 meter tall point guard.

== Career ==
Špan averaged 8.8 points and 2.2 assists per game in 2017–18 for Petrol Olimpija. He re-signed with the team on July 1, 2018. On July 11, 2019, Špan signed with the Crailsheim Merlins of the Basketball Bundesliga. He averaged 9.4 points, 4.2 assists and 2.3 rebounds per game. On August 12, 2020, Špan signed with Delteco Gipuzkoa Basket of the Liga ACB. On September 1, 2021, Špan signed with Larisa of the Greek Basket League. On November 25 of the same year, however, he parted ways with the Greek club.
