= 2025–26 ABA League First Division =

Basketball league in south-east Europe

AdmiralBet ABA League
- Season: 2025–26
- Duration: 3 October 2025 – 9 February 2026 (Regular season); 15 February 2026 – 21 April 2026 (Top 8); 12 February 2026 – 27 April 2026 (Play-out)
- Teams: 18
- TV partner: Arena Sport

Regular season
- Top seed: (United Arab Emirates Basketball Association) Dubai Basketball
- Season MVP: (Serbia) Bogoljub Marković

Finals
- Champions: (United Arab Emirates Basketball Association) Dubai Basketball (1st title)
- Runners-up: (Basketball Federation of Serbia) Partizan Mozzart Bet
- Semi-finalists: (Basketball Federation of Serbia) Crvena zvezda Meridianbet (Montenegro) Budućnost VOLI
- Finals MVP: (Canada) Mfiondu Kabengele

Awards
- Top Scorer: (Germany) Duane Washington
- Best Defensive Player: (Germany) Isaac Bonga
- Top Prospect: (Serbia) Bogoljub Marković
- Coach of the Year: (Montenegro) Zvezdan Mitrović

Statistical leaders
Points	(Germany) Duane Washington	21.2
Rebounds	(Serbia) Bogoljub Marković	8.8
Assists	(Romania) Fatts Russell	6.2
Steals	(United States) Joshua Scott	1.6
Blocks	(Serbia) Dušan Miletić	1.8
Efficiency	(Serbia) Bogoljub Marković	23.0

Records
- Biggest home win: Cedevita Olimpija 117–81 Mega (5 October 2025); Partizan 110–74 Split (28 December 2025)
- Biggest away win: U-BT Cluj-Napoca 72–110 Budućnost (19 April 2026)
- Highest scoring: Vienna 118–114 Spartak Subotica (16 January 2026)
- Lowest scoring: FMP 69–49 Spartak Subotica (6 April 2026)
- Winning streak: 15 games Dubai Basketball
- Losing streak: 8 games Studentski centar
- Highest attendance: 15,547; Partizan 81–74 Crvena zvezda (19 April 2026)
- Lowest attendance: 100 two games

The 2025–26 AdmiralBet ABA League is the 25th season of the ABA League. Beside 16 teams from Bosnia and Herzegovina, Croatia, Montenegro, Serbia, Slovenia and United Arab Emirates, the ABA league board proposed a possible expansion to 20 teams, with up to four wild cards given to any basketball team from Europe or wider. Some clubs from central and west Europe and Hapoel Tel Aviv from Israel showed interest in participating. On July 8, it was announced that Romanian club U-BT Cluj-Napoca and Austrian club BC Vienna got the wild cards, while Hapoel Tel Aviv qualified for the EuroLeague via EuroCup title.

Dubai Basketball secured their first championship in their second appearance, after defeating Partizan with 3-1 in a best-of-five final series, to become the first ever non former Yugoslavia country team to win the title since Maccabi Tel Aviv in 2012.

== Promotion and relegation ==
Location of teams in the 2025–26 season
Locations of the teams from Belgrade in the 2025–26 season
Location of the team Dubai in the 2025–26 season

Promoted	(Basketball Federation of Bosnia and Herzegovina) Bosna BH Telecom	2024–25 ABA 2 Champion
Promoted	(Slovenia) Ilirija	Winner of the Relegation playoffs
Affiliation	(Austria) BC Vienna	3-year license
Affiliation	(United Arab Emirates Basketball Association) Dubai Basketball	3-year license
Affiliation	(Romania) U-BT Cluj-Napoca	3-year license
Relegated	(Croatia) Cibona	Loser of the Relegation playoffs
Relegated	(Basketball Federation of Montenegro) Mornar Barsko zlato	Finished last

== Venues and locations ==
Team	Home city	Arena	Capacity
(Austria) BC Vienna	Vienna	Hallmann Dome	1,399
(Basketball Federation of Serbia) Borac Mozzart	Čačak	Borac Hall	4,000
(Basketball Federation of Bosnia and Herzegovina) Bosna BH Telecom	Sarajevo	Zetra Olympic Hall	12,000
(Basketball Federation of Montenegro) Budućnost VOLI	Podgorica	Morača Sports Center	6,000
(Basketball Federation of Slovenia) Cedevita Olimpija	Ljubljana	Arena Stožice	12,480
(Basketball Federation of Serbia) Crvena zvezda Meridianbet	Belgrade	Aleksandar Nikolić Hall; Belgrade Arena (2 games); Ranko Žeravica Hall (1 game)	8,000 / 18,386 / 5,000
(United Arab Emirates Basketball Association) Dubai Basketball	Dubai	Coca-Cola Arena	17,000
(Basketball Federation of Serbia) FMP	Belgrade	Železnik Hall	3,000
(Basketball Federation of Bosnia and Herzegovina) Igokea m:tel	Aleksandrovac	Laktaši Sports Hall	3,050
(Slovenia) Ilirija	Ljubljana	Tivoli Hall	6,800
(Slovenia) Krka	Novo Mesto	Leon Štukelj Hall	2,500
(Basketball Federation of Serbia) Mega Superbet	Belgrade	Ranko Žeravica Sports Hall	5,000
(Basketball Federation of Serbia) Partizan Mozzart Bet	Belgrade	Belgrade Arena	18,386
(Basketball Federation of Serbia) Spartak Office Shoes	Subotica	Dudova Šuma Hall	2,000
(Basketball Federation of Montenegro) SC Derby	Podgorica	Morača Sports Center	6,000
(Croatian Basketball Federation) Split	Split	Arena Gripe	3,500
(Romania) U-BT Cluj-Napoca	Cluj-Napoca	BTarena	10,000
(Croatian Basketball Federation) Zadar	Zadar	Krešimir Ćosić Hall	7,997

== Regular season ==
=== Group A ===
==== Standings ====
Pos	Team	Pld	W	L	PF	PA	PD	Pts	Qualification or relegation
1	(United Arab Emirates Basketball Association) Dubai Basketball	16	15	1	1409	1195	+214	31	Advance to Top 8
2	(Basketball Federation of Serbia) Partizan Mozzart Bet	16	15	1	1473	1297	+176	31	Advance to Top 8
3	(Romanian Basketball Federation) U-BT Cluj-Napoca	16	10	6	1488	1403	+85	26	Advance to Top 8
4	(Basketball Federation of Bosnia and Herzegovina) Igokea m:tel	16	8	8	1363	1433	−70	24	Advance to Top 8
5	(Basketball Federation of Serbia) FMP	16	6	10	1325	1385	−60	22	Advance to Play-out
6	(Basketball Federation of Serbia) Borac Mozzart	16	6	10	1274	1341	−67	22	Advance to Play-out
7	(Basketball Federation of Slovenia) Krka	16	5	11	1271	1321	−50	21	Advance to Play-out
8	(Croatian Basketball Federation) Split	16	4	12	1328	1479	−151	20	Advance to Play-out
9	(Basketball Federation of Montenegro) SC Derby	16	3	13	1258	1335	−77	19	Advance to Play-out

Source: ABA League

==== Results ====
Home \ Away	BOR	DUB	FMP	IGO	KRK	PAR	SPL	SCD	UBT
Borac Mozzart	—	53–77	74–83	97–75	71–69	91–106	92–84	89–82	87–93
Dubai Basketball	90–79	—	98–82	94–78	82–61	82–70	92–58	77–69	81–77
FMP	73–82	91–107	—	69–85	82–61	79–91	96–80	87–80	98–104
Igokea m:tel	81–73	74–88	92–88	—	87–71	81–103	93–85	66–94	114–108
Krka	81–77	79–83	81–71	85–86	—	92–99	105–92	77–65	83–85
Partizan Mozzart Bet	85–74	86–76	109–103	90–84	84–78	—	110–74	94–72	90–79
Split	89–80	78–92	76–85	98–93	80–91	81–86	—	102–94	87–80
SC Derby	76–79	67–80	72–73	84–90	85–75	66–78	85–77	—	82–95
U-BT Cluj-Napoca	97–76	93–110	93–65	106–84	92–82	85–92	105–87	96–85	—

Source: ABA League
Legend: Blue = home team win; Red = away team win.
Matches with lighter background shading were decided after overtime.

=== Group B ===
==== Standings ====
Pos	Team	Pld	W	L	PF	PA	PD	Pts	Qualification or relegation
1	(Basketball Federation of Montenegro) Budućnost VOLI	16	13	3	1417	1269	+148	29	Advance to Top 8
2	(Basketball Federation of Serbia) Crvena zvezda Meridianbet	16	12	4	1480	1328	+152	28	Advance to Top 8
3	(Basketball Federation of Slovenia) Cedevita Olimpija	16	11	5	1432	1311	+121	27	Advance to Top 8
4	(Basketball Federation of Bosnia and Herzegovina) Bosna BH Telecom	16	8	8	1334	1369	−35	24	Advance to Top 8
5	(Basketball Federation of Serbia) Spartak Office Shoes	16	8	8	1329	1334	−5	24	Advance to Play-out
6	(Basketball Federation of Serbia) Mega Superbet	16	6	10	1370	1485	−115	22	Advance to Play-out
7	(Croatian Basketball Federation) Zadar	16	5	11	1303	1357	−54	21	Advance to Play-out
8	(Basketball Federation of Slovenia) Perspektiva Ilirija	16	5	11	1298	1395	−97	21	Advance to Play-out
9	(Basketball Austria) Vienna	16	4	12	1346	1461	−115	20	Advance to Play-out

Source: ABA League

==== Results ====
Home \ Away	BOS	BUD	COL	CZV	ILI	MEG	SPA	VIE	ZAD
Bosna BH Telecom	—	82–91	92–96	77–86	78–93	94–83	72–57	71–68	93–85
Budućnost VOLI	90–80	—	88–71	80–93	84–78	100–82	93–97	102–91	98–87
Cedevita Olimpija	89–73	72–83	—	87–86	83–69	117–81	86–65	86–59	97–72
Crvena zvezda Meridianbet	97–92	95–79	97–77	—	101–87	94–73	93–77	108–99	79–85
Perspektiva Ilirija	79–83	66–86	96–93	74–91	—	77–86	78–75	94–80	85–83
Mega Superbet	106–88	65–98	72–90	107–102	109–83	—	89–94	100–98	90–89
Spartak Office Shoes	86–93	66–75	84–87	85–80	104–86	85–73	—	79–66	76–75
Vienna	86–88	78–83	93–89	82–98	85–84	88–81	118–114	—	77–86
Zadar	77–78	66–87	101–112	67–80	74–69	88–73	70–85	98–78	—

Source: ABA League
Legend: Blue = home team win; Red = away team win.
Matches with lighter background shading were decided after overtime.

== Top 8 ==
=== Standings ===
Pos	Team	Pld	W	L	PF	PA	PD	Pts	Qualification or relegation
1	(United Arab Emirates Basketball Association) Dubai Basketball	24	21	3	2150	1849	+301	45	Qualification to Playoffs
2	(Basketball Federation of Serbia) Partizan Mozzart Bet	24	21	3	2186	1919	+267	45	Qualification to Playoffs
3	(Basketball Federation of Serbia) Crvena zvezda Meridianbet	24	18	6	2192	2019	+173	42	Qualification to Playoffs
4	(Basketball Federation of Montenegro) Budućnost VOLI	24	18	6	2153	1943	+210	42	Qualification to Playoffs
5	(Romanian Basketball Federation) U-BT Cluj-Napoca	24	13	11	2175	2145	+30	37	Qualification to Playoffs
6	(Basketball Federation of Slovenia) Cedevita Olimpija	24	13	11	2104	2002	+102	37	Qualification to Playoffs
7	(Basketball Federation of Bosnia and Herzegovina) Bosna BH Telecom	24	10	14	1949	2077	−128	34	Qualification to Play-in
8	(Basketball Federation of Bosnia and Herzegovina) Igokea m:tel	24	10	14	1986	2150	−164	34	Qualification to Play-in

Source: ABA League

=== Results ===
Home \ Away	BOS	BUD	COL	CZV	DUB	IGO	PAR	UBT
Bosna BH Telecom	—				64–92	86–89	56–96	90–93
Budućnost VOLI		—			78–95	99–67	95–89	94–89
Cedevita Olimpija			—		93–80	102–88	79–85	72–84
Crvena zvezda Meridianbet				—	84–82	94–84	100–96	86–76
Dubai Basketball	100–82	89–78	89–84	114–91	—			
Igokea m:tel	66–73	75–100	81–77	73–86		—		
Partizan Mozzart Bet	82–66	98–82	86–70	81–74			—	
U-BT Cluj-Napoca	90–98	72–110	98–95	85–97				—

Source: ABA League
Legend: Blue = home team win; Red = away team win.
Matches with lighter background shading were decided after overtime.

== Play-out ==
=== Standings ===
Pos	Team	Pld	W	L	PF	PA	PD	Pts	Qualification or relegation
1	(Basketball Federation of Serbia) Spartak Office Shoes	26	14	12	2112	2084	+28	40	Qualification to Play-in
2	(Croatian Basketball Federation) Zadar	26	12	14	2036	2043	−7	38	Qualification to Play-in
3	(Basketball Federation of Serbia) Mega Superbet	26	12	14	2258	2346	−88	38	
4	(Basketball Federation of Serbia) FMP	26	11	15	2168	2183	−15	37	
5	(Basketball Federation of Slovenia) Krka	26	10	16	2046	2097	−51	36	
6	(Basketball Federation of Slovenia) Perspektiva Ilirija	26	10	16	2177	2256	−79	36	
7	(Basketball Austria) Vienna	26	9	17	2186	2319	−133	35	
8	(Basketball Federation of Montenegro) SC Derby	26	9	17	1950	2028	−78	35	
9	(Basketball Federation of Serbia) Borac Mozzart	26	8	18	2071	2213	−142	34	Qualification to relegation playoffs
10	(Croatian Basketball Federation) Split	26	7	19	2162	2389	−227	33	Relegation to the Second Division

Source: ABA League

=== Results ===
Home \ Away	BOR	FMP	ILI	KRK	MEG	SPA	SPL	SCD	VIE	ZAD
Borac Mozzart	—		87–91		89–98	90–99			85–76	65–67
FMP		—	82–88		102–87	69–49			84–92	85–55
Perspektiva Ilirija	89–94	106–101	—	77–83			98–84	74–75		
Krka			72–71	—	78–82	66–61			97–73	65–75
Mega Superbet	95–77	79–84		103–98	—		95–72	90–76		
Spartak Office Shoes	92–66	77–73		76–68		—	92–71	77–71		
Split			107–112		96–74	93–83	—		76–85	59–79
SC Derby			76–73		89–85	83–77		—	83–72	73–59
Vienna	84–81	89–98		92–76			86–99	91–79	—	
Zadar	81–63	76–65		66–72			106–77	69–62		—

Source: ABA League
Legend: Blue = home team win; Red = away team win.
Matches with lighter background shading were decided after overtime.

== Play-in ==
Play-in games
TE7	(Basketball Federation of Bosnia and Herzegovina) Bosna BH Telecom	80
TE8	(Basketball Federation of Bosnia and Herzegovina) Igokea m:tel	76
PO1	(Basketball Federation of Serbia) Spartak Office Shoes	86
PO2	(Croatian Basketball Federation) Zadar	68

No. 8 seed game
(Basketball Federation of Bosnia and Herzegovina) Igokea m:tel	68
(Basketball Federation of Serbia) Spartak Office Shoes	80

Final seeds
(Basketball Federation of Bosnia and Herzegovina) Bosna BH Telecom	No. 7 seed
(Basketball Federation of Serbia) Spartak Office Shoes	No. 8 seed

== Playoffs ==
=== Bracket ===
Quarterfinals
(1) (United Arab Emirates) Dubai Basketball	2
(8) (Serbia) Spartak Office Shoes	0
(4) (Montenegro) Budućnost VOLI	2
(5) (Romania) U-BT Cluj-Napoca	1
(2) (Serbia) Partizan Mozzart Bet	2
(7) (Bosnia and Herzegovina) Bosna BH Telecom	0
(3) (Serbia) Crvena zvezda Meridianbet	2
(6) (Slovenia) Cedevita Olimpija	1

Semifinals
(1) (United Arab Emirates) Dubai Basketball	2
(4) (Montenegro) Budućnost VOLI	1
(2) (Serbia) Partizan Mozzart Bet	2
(3) (Serbia) Crvena zvezda Meridianbet	0

Finals
(1) (United Arab Emirates) Dubai Basketball	3
(2) (Serbia) Partizan Mozzart Bet	1

=== Quarterfinals ===
Team 1	Series	Team 2	Game 1	Game 2	Game 3
(1) Dubai Basketball (United Arab Emirates)	2–0	(Serbia) Spartak Office Shoes (8)	102–74	88–84	—
(4) Budućnost VOLI (Montenegro)	2–1	(Romania) U-BT Cluj-Napoca (5)	86–73	90–94	112–81
(2) Partizan Mozzart Bet (Serbia)	2–0	(Bosnia and Herzegovina) Bosna BH Telecom (7)	81–73	87–73	—
(3) Crvena zvezda Meridianbet (Serbia)	2–1	(Slovenia) Cedevita Olimpija (6)	101–92	86–92	95–86

=== Semifinals ===
Team 1	Series	Team 2	Game 1	Game 2	Game 3
(1) Dubai Basketball (United Arab Emirates)	2–1	(Montenegro) Budućnost VOLI (4)	104–90	90–91	103–77
(2) Partizan Mozzart Bet (Serbia)	2–0	(Serbia) Crvena zvezda Meridianbet (3)	100–94	89–78	—

=== Finals ===
Team 1	Series	Team 2	Game 1	Game 2	Game 3	Game 4	Game 5
(1) Dubai Basketball (United Arab Emirates)	3–1	(Serbia) Partizan Mozzart Bet (2)	99–93	86–81	70–84	83–81	—

== Relegation playoffs ==
The 15th placed team of the First Division season and the runners-up of the Second Division season will play in the Qualifiers for a spot in the next First Division season.

Qualified clubs
Leagues	Clubs
First Division	(Serbia) Borac Mozzart
Second Division	(Basketball Federation of North Macedonia) TFT Skopje

Team 1	Series	Team 2	Game 1	Game 2	Game 3
(Basketball Federation of Serbia) Borac Mozzart	2–0	(Basketball Federation of North Macedonia) TFT Skopje	97–61	97–65	—

== MVP List ==
=== MVP of the Round ===
Round	Player	Team	PIR
Regular season
1	(United States) Umoja Gibson	(Slovenia) Cedevita Olimpija	27
2	(Serbia) Savo Drezgić	(Serbia) Mega Superbet	31
3	(Nigeria) Chima Moneke	(Serbia) Crvena zvezda Meridianbet	36
4	(United States) Jake Stephens	(Croatia) Split	40
5	(Serbia) Bogoljub Marković	(Serbia) Mega Superbet (2)	35
6	(Cuba) Karel Guzmán	(Romania) U-BT Cluj-Napoca	34
7	(United States) Boogie Ellis	(United Arab Emirates) Dubai Basketball	34
8	(Serbia) Dušan Miletić	(Romania) U-BT Cluj-Napoca (2)	36
9	(Montenegro) Vladimir Mihailović	(Croatia) Zadar	42
10	(Serbia) Nikola Manojlović	(Serbia) Borac Mozzart	41
11	(Germany) Duane Washington	(Serbia) Partizan Mozzart Bet	46
12	(Germany) Isaac Bonga	(Serbia) Partizan Mozzart Bet (2)	29
13	(United States) Umoja Gibson (2)	(Slovenia) Cedevita Olimpija (2)	37
14	(Guinea) Souley Boum	(Austria) Vienna	32
15	(Guinea) Souley Boum (2)	(Austria) Vienna (2)	36
16	(Serbia) Pavle Nikolić	(Serbia) Borac Mozzart (2)	39
17	(Serbia) Bogoljub Marković (2)	(Serbia) Mega Superbet (3)	41
18	(Serbia) Filip Barna	(Serbia) FMP	33
Top 8
1	(Romania) Fatts Russell	(Romania) U-BT Cluj-Napoca (3)	37
2	(Bulgaria) Codi Miller-McIntyre	(Serbia) Crvena zvezda Meridianbet (2)	32
3	(Estonia) Janari Jõesaar	(Bosnia and Herzegovina) Bosna BH Telecom	28
4	(Serbia) Strahinja Gavrilović	(Bosnia and Herzegovina) Igokea m:tel	33
5	(France) Axel Bouteille	(Montenegro) Budućnost VOLI	37
6	(France) Axel Bouteille (2)	(Montenegro) Budućnost VOLI (2)	25
7	(Bosnia and Herzegovina) Aleksandar Lazić	(Bosnia and Herzegovina) Igokea m:tel (2)	28
8	(Germany) Isaac Bonga (2)	(Serbia) Partizan Mozzart Bet (3)	28
Play-out
1	(United States) Wendell Green	(Slovenia) Perspektiva Ilirija	32
2	(Montenegro) Vladimir Mihailović (2)	(Croatia) Zadar (2)	33
3	(Lithuania) Simas Jarumbauskas	(Austria) Vienna (3)	30
4	(Serbia) Stefan Momirov	(Serbia) Spartak Office Shoes	29
5	(Serbia) Boban Marjanović	(Slovenia) Perspektiva Ilirija (2)	35
6	(Guinea) Souley Boum (3)	(Austria) Vienna (4)	51
7	(Serbia) Bogoljub Marković (3)	(Serbia) Mega Superbet (4)	41
8	(United States) Glenn Cosey	(Croatia) Split (2)	39
9	(Montenegro) Vladimir Mihailović (3)	(Croatia) Zadar (3)	30
10	(Serbia) Bogoljub Marković (4)	(Serbia) Mega Superbet (5)	42
Play-in
1	(Bosnia and Herzegovina) Edin Atić	(Bosnia and Herzegovina) Bosna BH Telecom (2)	28
2	(Jamaica) Shevon Thompson	(Serbia) Spartak Office Shoes (2)	25
Playoffs
QF1	(United States) Jordan Nwora	(Serbia) Crvena Zvezda Meridianbet (3)	36
QF2	(Bosnia and Herzegovina) Džanan Musa	(United Arab Emirates) Dubai Basketball (2)	33
QF3	(France) Axel Bouteille (3)	(Montenegro) Budućnost VOLI (3)	28
SF1	(Brazil) Bruno Caboclo	(United Arab Emirates) Dubai Basketball (3)	30
SF2	(Germany) Dylan Osetkowski	(Serbia) Partizan Mozzart Bet (4)	25
SF3	(Bosnia and Herzegovina) Kenan Kamenjaš	(United Arab Emirates) Dubai Basketball (4)	23
F1	(United States) McKinley Wright IV	(United Arab Emirates) Dubai Basketball (5)	26
F2	(Serbia) Aleksa Avramović	(United Arab Emirates) Dubai Basketball (6)	16
F3	(Angola) Bruno Fernando	(Serbia) Partizan Mozzart Bet (5)	27
F4	(Canada) Mfiondu Kabengele	(United Arab Emirates) Dubai Basketball (7)	21

Source: ABA League

=== MVP of the Month ===
Month	Player	Team	Ref.
2025
October	(Slovenia) Gregor Glas	(Austria) Vienna	
November	(Serbia) Dušan Miletić	(Romania) U-BT Cluj-Napoca	
December	(Germany) Duane Washington	(Serbia) Partizan Mozzart Bet	
2026
January & February	(Serbia) Bogoljub Marković	(Serbia) Mega Superbet	
March	(Serbia) Stefan Miljenović	(Serbia) Crvena zvezda Meridianbet	
April	(United States) Yogi Ferrell	(Montenegro) Budućnost VOLI	

== Awards ==
Pos.	Player	Team	Ref.
MVP
PF	(Serbia) Bogoljub Marković	(Serbia) Mega Superbet	
Finals MVP
C	(Canada) Mfiondu Kabengele	(United Arab Emirates) Dubai Basketball	
Top Scorer
SG	(Germany) Duane Washington	(Serbia) Partizan Mozzart Bet	
Best Defensive Player
SF	(Germany) Isaac Bonga	(Serbia) Partizan Mozzart Bet	
Top Prospect
PF	(Serbia) Bogoljub Marković	(Serbia) Mega Superbet	
Coach of the Season
HC	(Montenegro) Zvezdan Mitrović	(Slovenia) Cedevita Olimpija	
The Ideal Starting Five
G	(United States) Dwayne Bacon	(United Arab Emirates) Dubai Basketball	
G	(Australia) Mitch Creek	(Romania) U-BT Cluj-Napoca	
F	(Germany) Isaac Bonga	(Serbia) Partizan Mozzart Bet	
F	(Serbia) Bogoljub Marković	(Serbia) Mega Superbet	
C	(Canada) Mfiondu Kabengele	(United Arab Emirates) Dubai Basketball	

== Clubs in European competitions ==
Competition	Team	Progress	Result
EuroLeague	(Basketball Federation of Serbia) Crvena zvezda Meridianbet	Play-in	Eliminated by (Spanish Basketball Federation) FC Barcelona
EuroLeague	(United Arab Emirates Basketball Association) Dubai Basketball	Regular season	11th (19–19)
EuroLeague	(Basketball Federation of Serbia) Partizan Mozzart Bet	Regular season	15th (16–22)
EuroCup	(Basketball Federation of Slovenia) Cedevita Olimpija	Quarterfinals	Eliminated by (French Federation of Basketball) Cosea JL Bourg
EuroCup	(Romanian Basketball Federation) U-BT Cluj-Napoca	Quarterfinals	Eliminated by (Turkish Basketball Federation) Bahçeşehir Koleji
EuroCup	(Basketball Federation of Montenegro) Budućnost VOLI	Eightfinals	Eliminated by (Romanian Basketball Federation) U-BT Cluj-Napoca
Champions League	(Basketball Federation of Serbia) Spartak Office Shoes	Play-ins	Eliminated by (Hellenic Basketball Federation) Karditsa Iaponiki
Champions League	(Basketball Federation of Bosnia and Herzegovina) Igokea m:tel	Regular season Group E	4th (1–5)
Champions League	(Basketball Federation of Montenegro) SC Derby	Qualification round – Quarter-finals	Eliminated by (Hellenic Basketball Federation) PAOK mateco
FIBA Europe Cup	(Basketball Federation of Bosnia and Herzegovina) Bosna BH Telecom	Quarterfinals	Eliminated by (Hungarian Basketball Federation) Falco Szombathely

== See also ==
- 2025–26 ABA League Second Division
