= Džanan Musa =

Bosnian basketball player (born 1999)

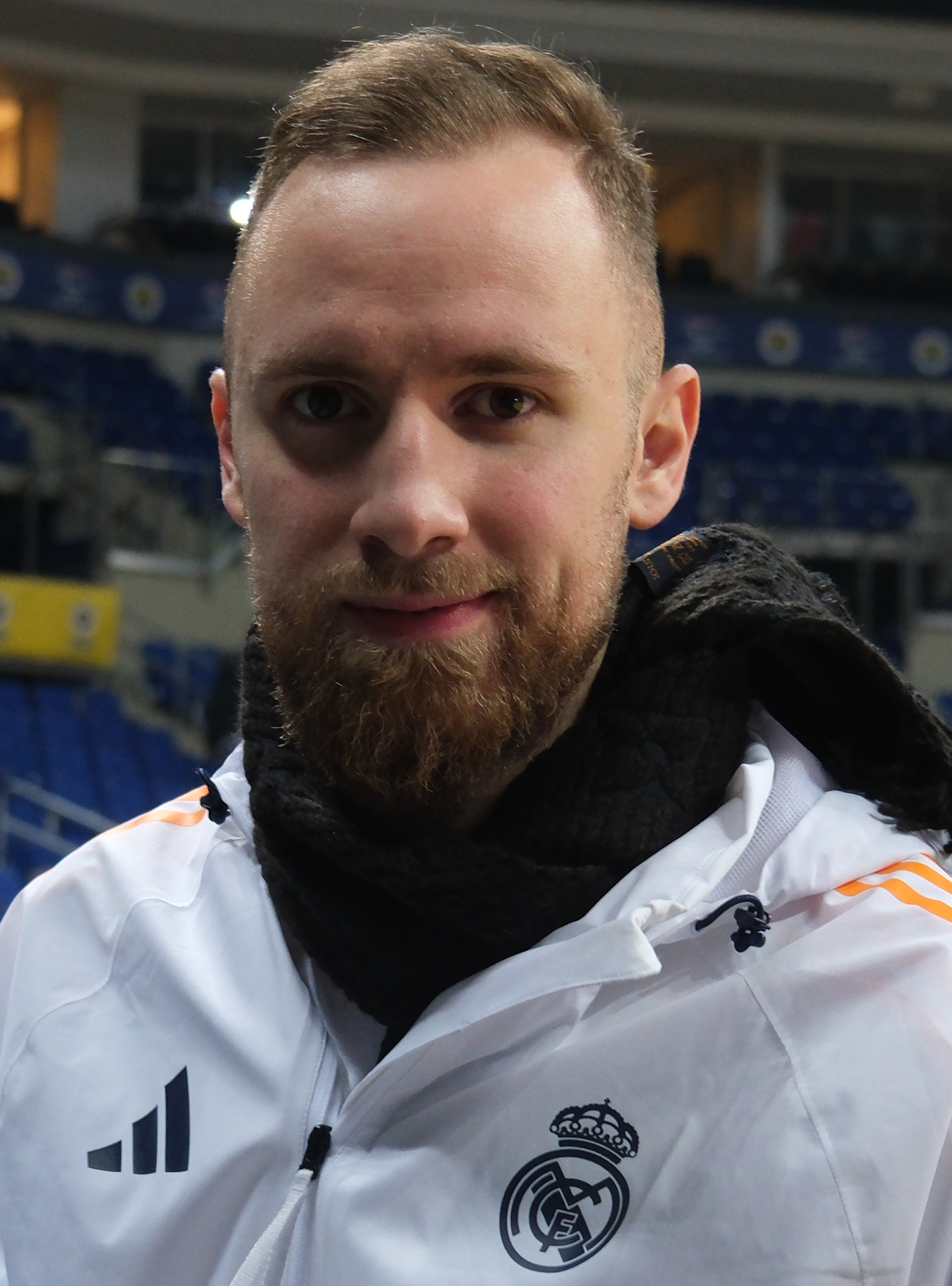
- Musa with Real Madrid in 2025

No. 13 – Dubai Basketball
- Position: Shooting guard / small forward
- League: ABA League; EuroLeague

Personal information
- Born: 8 May 1999 (age 27) Bihać, Bosnia and Herzegovina
- Listed height: 2.05 m (6 ft 9 in)
- Listed weight: 223 lb (101 kg)

Career information
- NBA draft: 2018: 1st round, 29th overall pick
- Drafted by: Brooklyn Nets
- Playing career: 2015–present

Career history
- 2015–2018: Cedevita
- 2018–2020: Brooklyn Nets
- 2018–2020: →Long Island Nets
- 2021: Anadolu Efes
- 2021–2022: Breogán
- 2022–2025: Real Madrid
- 2025–present: Dubai Basketball

Career highlights
- 2× EuroLeague champion (2021, 2023); All-EuroLeague First Team (2023); EuroCup Rising Star (2018); 2× Liga ACB champion (2024, 2025); Spanish Cup winner (2024); 2× Spanish Supercup winner (2022, 2023); Liga ACB MVP (2022); Liga ACB Finals MVP (2024); 2× All-Liga ACB First Team (2022, 2023); Liga ACB Top Scorer (2022); Turkish Super League champion (2021); ABA League champion (2026); 3× Croatian League champion (2016–2018); 3× Croatian Cup winner (2016–2018); All-ABA League Team (2018); ABA League Top Prospect (2018); FIBA U16 EuroBasket MVP (2015); 2× Bosnian Sportsman of the Year (2022, 2023)
- Stats at NBA.com
- Stats at Basketball Reference
Medals
Men's basketball
Representing Bosnia and Herzegovina
FIBA U16 EuroBasket
Gold medal – first place	2015 Lithuania	National team

Džanan Musa (Bosnian pronunciation: [d͡ʒânan mûsa], born 8 May 1999) is a Bosnian professional basketball player for Dubai Basketball of the ABA League and the EuroLeague. He also represents the senior Bosnia and Herzegovina national team. Standing at 6 ft 9 in (2.06 m) and weighing 215 pounds (98 kg), Musa plays at the shooting guard and small forward positions. He was selected by the Brooklyn Nets with the 29th pick in the 2018 NBA draft.

== Early career ==
Born in Bihać, Bosnia and Herzegovina, Musa began playing soccer at first, before choosing to focus on basketball. Musa started playing junior basketball in the youth setup at KK Bosna XXL, when he was 8 years old. He then moved to Sarajevo-based KK Koš, before joining Croatian team KK Cedevita in 2014.

== Professional career ==
=== Cedevita (2014–2018) ===
In December 2014, he signed a deal with Croatian team Cedevita. Musa made his debut in Europe's top-tier level competition, the EuroLeague, on 15 October 2015, making him the ninth-youngest player to make their debut in the EuroLeague. Musa played the first 4:55 minutes of the game and recorded 4 points.

In June 2017, Musa attended the Adidas Eurocamp, a basketball camp based in Treviso for international NBA draft prospects. He was named the Eurocamp 2017 Most Improved Player.

In the 2017–18 season, while a member of Cedevita, Musa was awarded the EuroCup Rising Star Trophy, after averaging 10.5 points and 3.2 rebounds per game, in 16 games played in Europe's 2nd-tier level EuroCup competition. He was also named the ABA League Top Prospect as well as to the All-ABA League Team for the 2017–18 season.

=== Brooklyn Nets (2018–2020) ===
On 12 April 2018, Musa declared for the 2018 NBA draft, where he was expected to be a first round selection. On 21 June, he was selected with the 29th overall pick by the Brooklyn Nets. On 12 July, the Nets signed Musa to a rookie scale contract. During his rookie season, Musa had multiple assignments to the Long Island Nets of the NBA G League.

On 19 November 2020, Musa was traded to the Detroit Pistons in a three-team trade. On 21 December 2020, Musa was waived by the Pistons.

=== Anadolu Efes (2021) ===
On 13 January 2021, Musa signed a 2.5 year contract with Anadolu Efes of the Turkish Basketball Super League. On 27 June 2021, Efes used their option to exit from their mutual contract and Musa became a free agent. His short run with the Turkish club had four EuroLeague appearances and a short playing time total of 12 minutes. He also played in eight Turkish league games, averaging 11.4 points per game.

=== Breogán (2021–2022) ===
On 21 July 2021, Musa signed with Río Breogán of the Liga ACB. In just one season, Musa became one of Breogán's most legendary players, by helping them sealing participation in the Copa del Rey for the first time in more than 30 years. Musa's best moments in a Breogán jersey include two games against Valencia Basket, scoring 33 points with 44 PIR and 31 points with 47 PIR, and a game-winner against Breogán's arch-rivals Obradoiro. He won several Player of the Week awards and two Player of the Month awards, and topped it off with the Liga ACB MVP of the Season award, which also made him the first Breogán player to ever win the most prestigious individual award in Spanish basketball.

=== Real Madrid (2022–2025) ===
On 14 July 2022, Musa signed a two-year deal with reigning Spanish champions and EuroLeague finalists Real Madrid. In 2023, he played a crucial role in Real Madrid winning the 2023 EuroLeague Championship. He was named to the 2022-23 All-EuroLeague First Team. On 8 July 2024, Musa renewed his contract with the Spanish powerhouse for an additional season.

=== Dubai Basketball (2025–present) ===
On 7 July 2025, Musa signed with Dubai Basketball of the ABA League.

== National team career ==
Musa played at the 2014 FIBA Europe Under-16 Championship with the Bosnian national Under-16 team, leading the tournament in scoring, at 23.0 points per game. He also played at the 2015 FIBA Europe Under-16 Championship, which he led in scoring, at 23.3 points per game, and in assisting, at 6.3 assists per game. He also averaged 9.0 rebounds per game, during the tournament. In the tournament's finals game, against the tournament's hosts, Lithuania, Musa scored 33 points, to go along with his 8 rebounds, 7 assists, 3 steals and 2 blocks, leading his team to an 85–83 victory, and securing a gold medal for his team. Musa was named the MVP of the tournament, and he was also selected to the All-Tournament Team. Musa was named the MVP of the tournament, and he was also selected to the All-Tournament Team.

=== U17 World Cup scoring record ===
Musa also played at the 2016 FIBA Under-17 World Cup, which he led in scoring and in efficiency, with 34.0 points per game, and 27.7 efficiency per game and 194.0 overall. He also averaged 8.1 rebounds and 3.0 assists per game. During the tournament, Musa made history by breaking the record in most points scored in a single competitive game with 50 points in a game against Chinese Taipei, previous being 41 points and shared by Isaac Humphries and Jalen Howard, who scored his on 23 June, just six days earlier of Musa. On 29 June, Musa managed to shoot 18-of-26 from the field and 11-of-15 from the free-throw line, adding 7 rebounds and 4 assists during 27 minutes and 15 seconds he spent on court. This is the current record for the most points scored in a single game at the FIBA Under-17 World Cup tournament. He was selected to the All-Tournament Team.

== Career statistics ==
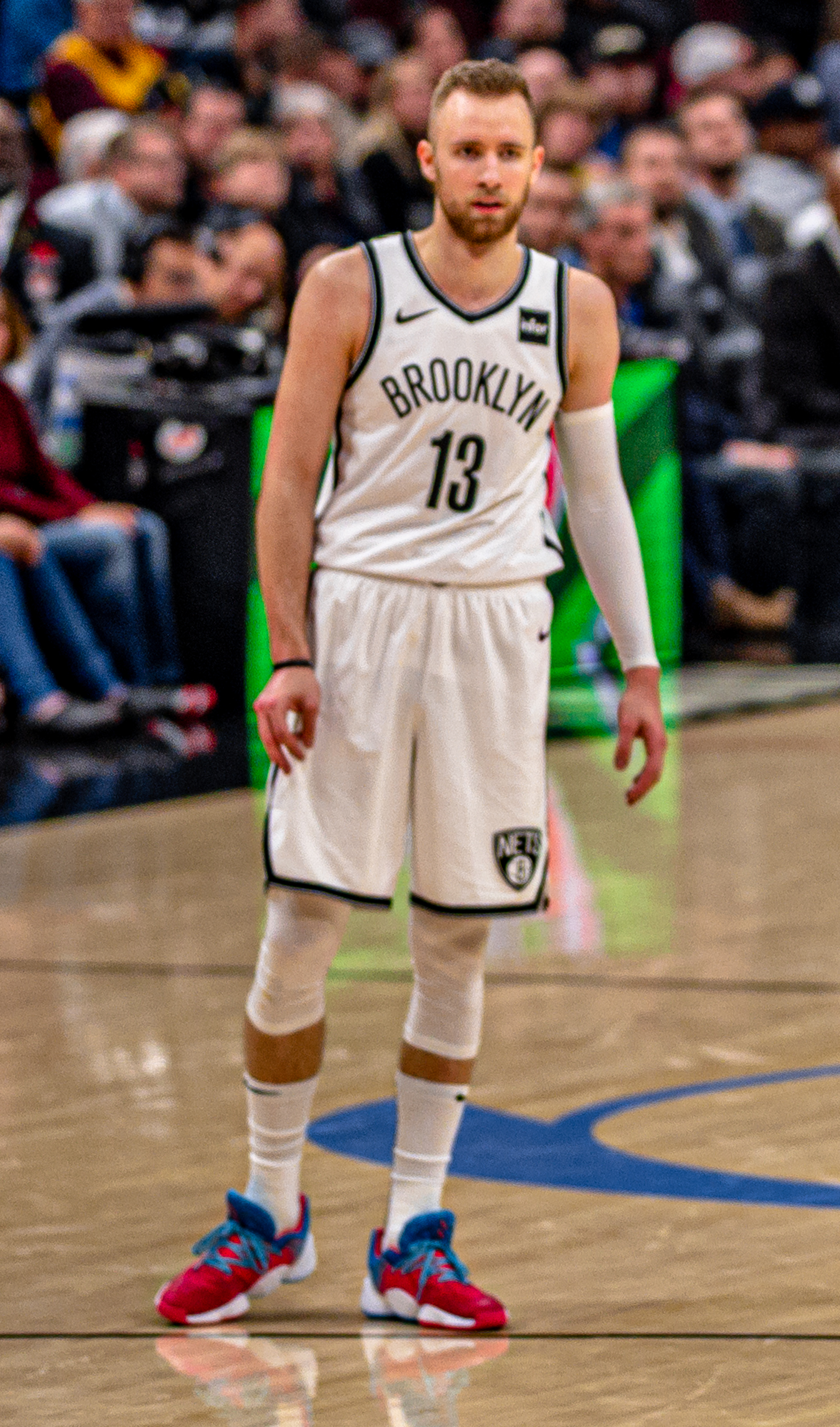
Musa with the Brooklyn Nets in 2019

Legend
GP	Games played	GS	Games started	MPG	Minutes per game
FG%	Field-goal percentage	3P%	3-point field-goal percentage	FT%	Free-throw percentage
RPG	Rebounds per game	APG	Assists per game	SPG	Steals per game
BPG	Blocks per game	PPG	Points per game	PIR	Performance index rating
**Bold**	Career high

=== EuroLeague ===
†	Denotes seasons in which Musa won the EuroLeague
*	Led the league

Year	Team	GP	GS	MPG	FG%	3P%	FT%	RPG	APG	SPG	BPG	PPG	PIR
2015–16	Cedevita	10	2	7.8	.357	.250	.667	1.3	.7	.2	.1	2.7	1.6
2020–21†	Anadolu Efes	4	0	3.0	.000	.000	—	.5	.3	.3	—	0.0	-0.5
2022–23†	Real Madrid	**41***	**31**	**23.1**	.488	.371	.860	3.1	2.7	.4	**.2**	**14.8**	**15.9**
2023–24	Real Madrid	38	29	21.0	**.523**	**.413**	.819	2.7	2.2	.3	**.2**	13.5	14.5
2024–25	Real Madrid	35	23	21.4	.469	.372	.812	2.9	2.0	.4	.1	12.2	10.8
2025–26	Dubai	18	10	26.4	.466	.360	**.882**	**3.7**	**3.2**	**.6**	**.2**	14.3	15.6
Career		146	95	21.1	.486	.377	.839	2.8	2.3	.3	.2	12.5	13.2

=== NBA ===
==== Regular season ====
Year	Team	GP	GS	MPG	FG%	3P%	FT%	RPG	APG	SPG	BPG	PPG
2018–19	Brooklyn	9	0	4.3	**.409**	.100	.000	.6	.2	.2	.0	2.1
2019–20	Brooklyn	**40**	0	**12.2**	.372	**.244**	**.750**	**2.2**	**1.1**	**.4**	.0	**4.8**
Career		49	0	10.7	.376	.227	.726	1.9	.9	.3	.0	4.3

==== Playoffs ====
Year	Team	GP	GS	MPG	FG%	3P%	FT%	RPG	APG	SPG	BPG	PPG
2019	Brooklyn	2	0	7.5	**.667**	.000	—	.0	.0	**1.0**	.0	2.0
2020	Brooklyn	**3**	0	**13.0**	.182	.000	**.714**	**1.0**	**1.3**	.0	**.3**	**4.7**
Career		5	0	10.8	.286	.000	.714	.6	.8	.4	.2	3.6

=== Domestic leagues ===
Year	Team	League	GP	MPG	FG%	3P%	FT%	RPG	APG	SPG	BPG	PPG
2015–16	(Croatia) Cedevita	A-1	6	11.6	.500	.462	.617	3.0	1.2	.5	.2	7.3
2015–16	(Croatia) Cedevita	ABA	21	12.5	.439	.231	.739	2.9	.5	.5	.1	4.7
2016–17	(Croatia) Cedevita	A-1	29	22.8	.446	.362	.764	3.3	1.8	.9	.1	12.8
2016–17	(Croatia) Cedevita	ABA	22	14.5	.500	.341	.794	1.7	1.0	.3	.1	6.3
2017–18	(Croatia) Cedevita	A-1	32	24.2	.463	.291	.808	3.8	2.8	1.2	.3	13.3
2017–18	(Croatia) Cedevita	ABA	25	23.7	.476	.315	.822	3.3	1.6	1.1	.1	12.5
2020–21	(Turkey) Anadolu Efes	TBSL	8	22.2	.528	.263	.842	3.5	3.1	.8	.2	11.4
2021–22	(Spain) Río Breogán	ACB	30	32.0	.494	.381	.787	5.1	3.1	1.1	.3	20.1
2022–23	(Spain) Real Madrid	ACB	41	21.0	.535	.465	.805	2.5	2.0	.8	.2	14.4
2023–24	(Spain) Real Madrid	ACB	39	20.8	.511	.402	.824	2.8	2.0	.8	.2	14.2
2024–25	(Spain) Real Madrid	ACB	36	19.1	.495	.433	.843	2.8	1.4	.7	.2	12.9
2025–26	(United Arab Emirates) Dubai Basketball	ABA	22	24.7	.465	.400	.808	2.8	3.9	.8	.0	16.3

== Awards and accomplishments ==
=== Junior club level ===
- 2017 Adidas Eurocamp Most Improved Player

=== Bosnian junior national team ===
- FIBA Europe Under-16 Championship champion: 2015
- FIBA Europe Under-16 Championship All-Tournament Team: 2015
- FIBA Europe Under-16 Championship Most Valuable Player: 2015
- 2× FIBA Europe Under-16 Championship: Top scorer: 2014, 2015
- FIBA Under-17 World Championship All-Tournament Team: 2016

=== Professional club level ===
- ABA League Supercup winner: 2017
- ABA League Top Prospect: 2018
- All-ABA League Team: 2018
- EuroCup Basketball Rising Star: 2018
- ACB League MVP: 2021
- EuroLeague winner: 2021, 2023
- Bosnian Sportsman of the Year: 2022, 2023

== See also ==
- List of youngest EuroLeague players
