= ABA League Top Prospect =

The ABA League Top Prospect award, also known as the Adriatic League Top Prospect award, is an annual award given by the Adriatic League (ABA League), which is a European regional league, that is the top-tier level professional basketball league for clubs from the Former Yugoslavia. The award is given to the league's best young player, aged 22 and under. The inaugural award was given out in the 2013–14 ABA League season.

== Award winners ==
Adriatic League Top Prospect
- Sport: Basketball

History
- First award: 2014
- Editions: 12
- First winner: (Croatia) Dario Šarić
- Most recent: (Serbia) Bogoljub Marković (2026)

Year	Winner	Club(s)	Ref.
2014	(Croatia) Dario Šarić	(Croatia) Cibona	
2015	(Serbia) Nikola Jokić	(Serbia) Mega Leks	
2016	(Croatia) Ante Žižić	(Croatia) Cibona (2)	
2017	(Australia) Jonah Bolden	(Serbia) FMP	
2018	(Bosnia and Herzegovina) Džanan Musa	(Croatia) Cedevita	
2019	(Georgia (country)) Goga Bitadze	(Montenegro) Budućnost VOLI	
2020	Not awarded		
2021	(Serbia) Filip Petrušev	(Serbia) Mega Soccerbet (2)	
2022	(Serbia) Nikola Jović	(Serbia) Mega Mozzart (3)	
2023	(Serbia) Nikola Đurišić	(Serbia) Mega MIS (4)	
2024	(Serbia) Nikola Topić	(Serbia) Crvena zvezda Meridianbet	
2025	(Serbia) Bogoljub Marković	(Serbia) Mega Superbet (5)	
2026	(Serbia) Bogoljub Marković (2)	(Serbia) Mega Superbet (6)	

== See also ==
- EuroLeague Rising Star
