= Isaac Bonga =

German basketball player (born 1999)

- Bonga with Partizan in 2026

No. 32 – Panathinaikos
- Position: Small forward / power forward
- League: GBL; EuroLeague

Personal information
- Born: November 8, 1999 (age 27) Neuwied, Germany
- Listed height: 6 ft 8 in (2.03 m)
- Listed weight: 238 lb (108 kg)

Career information
- NBA draft: 2018: 2nd round, 39th overall pick
- Drafted by: Philadelphia 76ers
- Playing career: 2016–present

Career history
- 2016–2018: Skyliners Frankfurt
- 2016–2018: →Skyliners Juniors
- 2018–2019: Los Angeles Lakers
- 2018–2019: →South Bay Lakers
- 2019–2021: Washington Wizards
- 2021–2022: Toronto Raptors
- 2021–2022: →Raptors 905
- 2022–2024: Bayern Munich
- 2024–2026: Partizan
- 2026–present: Panathinaikos

Career highlights
- ABA League champion (2025); Serbian League champion (2025); All-ABA League Team (2026); 2× ABA League Defensive Player of the Year (2025, 2026); German Bundesliga champion (2024); 2× German Cup winner (2023, 2024)
- Stats at NBA.com
- Stats at Basketball Reference
Medals
Men's basketball
Representing Germany
FIBA World Cup
Gold medal – first place	2023 Philippines–Japan–Indonesia
EuroBasket
Gold medal – first place	2025 Cyprus–Finland–Poland–Latvia

Isaac Evolue Etue Bofenda Bonga (born November 8, 1999) is a German professional basketball player for Panathinaikos of the Greek Basketball League (GBL) and the EuroLeague. Standing at 6 ft 8 in (2.03 m), he began his professional career with Skyliners Frankfurt of the Basketball Bundesliga. Bonga represents the Germany national team in international competitions. He was selected by the Philadelphia 76ers (second round, 39th overall) and immediately traded to the Los Angeles Lakers in the 2018 NBA draft.

== Early life ==
Bonga was born in Neuwied, Germany to parents originally from Kinshasa, Democratic Republic of the Congo. His father emigrated to Germany in the early 1990s with plans to move to Canada, but he instead stayed in the country and began living in Frankfurt and then Koblenz. Bonga's older brother Tarsis plays association football for Rot-Weiß Oberhausen, while his younger brother Joshua also plays basketball. At age seven, Bonga began playing streetball in Neuwied, and two years later, he joined the local club.

== Amateur career ==
Bonga is a product of Post SV Koblenz, and logged his first minutes in senior basketball during the 2014–15 season, when competing in Germany's fifth-tier level 2 Regionalliga with SG Lützel-Post Koblenz. After winning the championship with the team, and earning a league promotion to the fourth division (Regionalliga), he saw action in 24 games during the 2015–16 Regionalliga season, averaging 5.9 points, 2.8 rebounds and 2 assists per contest. He also represented the under-19 squad of Eintracht Frankfurt, in Germany's top-junior division NBBL.

== Professional career ==
=== Skyliners Frankfurt (2016–2018) ===
In June 2016, Bonga signed a four-year deal with Skyliners Frankfurt of the Basketball Bundesliga. He was invited to the NBA Top 100 camp in Charlottesville, Virginia, the same month. Bonga was one of the top European prospects to be picked to attend the 2016 Basketball without Borders Camp Europe in Helsinki in September 2016.

Bonga made his Bundesliga debut for the Skyliners at age 16 on September 23, 2016, in an 84–55 loss to Brose Bamberg, as he played 28 seconds.

=== Los Angeles Lakers (2018–2019) ===
On May 1, 2017, Bonga signed with agents Jason Ranne and Thad Foucher to enter the 2018 NBA draft, and entered the 2018 NBA draft as one of 54 international players to enter the draft that year. On June 21, 2018, Bonga was selected with the 39th overall pick in the 2018 NBA draft by the Philadelphia 76ers on behalf of the Los Angeles Lakers. On July 6, the Lakers officially acquired Bonga in a trade involving the 76ers trading him to the Lakers in exchange for a 2019 second round pick and cash considerations. After the acquisition, he signed a rookie-scale contract with the Lakers. He was assigned to their NBA G League team South Bay Lakers on October 22, after having appeared in preseason contests for the Los Angeles Lakers. In his G League debut on November 3, Bonga scored 27 points in a 108–106 loss to the Stockton Kings.

He made his NBA debut on December 7, 2018, playing one minute and seven seconds against the San Antonio Spurs. On December 20, Bonga was sent back to the G League. Bonga saw the hardwood in 22 games in his NBA rookie season to average 0.9 points and 1.1 rebounds. In G League play, he tallied 11.9 points per game in 31 contests as a rookie.

=== Washington Wizards (2019–2021) ===
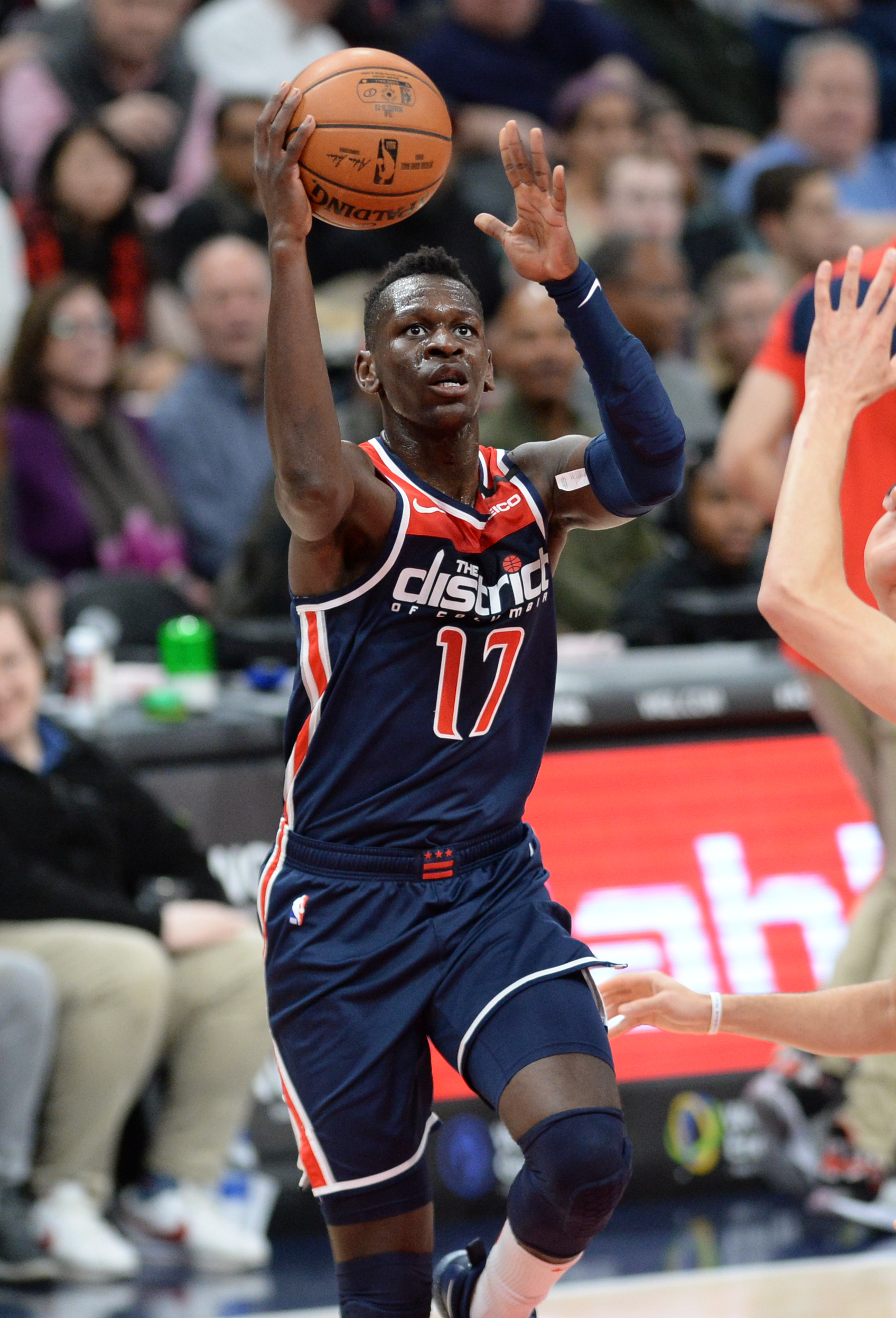
Bonga drives for a layup during a 2020 game

On July 5, 2019, Bonga was traded to the Washington Wizards in a three-team trade. With the Wizards, he averaged 5 points, 3.4 rebounds and 1.2 assists per game in his first year (2019–20). In the 2020–21 season, he averaged 2 points, 1.7 rebounds and 0.6 assists per contest.

=== Toronto Raptors (2021–2022) ===
Bonga signed with the Toronto Raptors as a free agent on August 12, 2021. He saw action in 15 regular-season games and had one playoff appearance, but never broke through.

=== Bayern Munich (2022–2024) ===
On August 19, 2022, Bonga signed a two-year deal with German powerhouse Bayern Munich. With the Munich team, Bonga won the 2024 German championship as well as the 2023 and 2024 German Cup championship. On July 10, 2024, Bonga parted ways with the German club.

=== Partizan (2024–2026) ===
On August 20, 2024, Bonga signed with Partizan of the Serbian SuperLeague, the ABA League, and the EuroLeague. In his debut season with Partizan, Bonga averaged 7.7 points and 4.5 rebounds over 30 EuroLeague games. During the 2024–25 season, Partizan managed to lift the record eighth ABA League championship, and the Serbian League championship, the first one after 11 seasons.

On July 2, 2025, Bonga signed a two-year contract extension with Partizan that runs through the 2027 season.

On July 4, 2026, Bonga left Partizan after activating the €700,000 exit clause in his contract.

=== Panathinaikos (2026–present) ===
On July 10, 2026, Bonga signed a three-year contract with Panathinaikos of the Greek Basketball League (GBL) and the EuroLeague.

== Career statistics ==
Legend
GP	Games played	GS	Games started	MPG	Minutes per game
FG%	Field-goal percentage	3P%	3-point field-goal percentage	FT%	Free-throw percentage
RPG	Rebounds per game	APG	Assists per game	SPG	Steals per game
BPG	Blocks per game	PPG	Points per game	PIR	Performance index rating
**Bold**	Career high

=== EuroLeague ===
Year	Team	GP	GS	MPG	FG%	3P%	FT%	RPG	APG	SPG	BPG	PPG	PIR
2022–23	Bayern Munich	30	**22**	20.3	.391	.333	.804	3.9	1.1	**.8**	.1	6.4	6.8
2023–24	Bayern Munich	**31**	21	19.9	.439	.299	.795	4.2	**1.2**	.7	.3	5.8	7.2
2024–25	Partizan	30	20	**25.0**	**.442**	**.412**	**.933**	**4.5**	1.1	.7	**.5**	**7.7**	**9.8**
Career		91	63	21.7	.424	.358	.843	4.2	1.1	.7	.3	6.6	7.9

=== NBA ===
==== Regular season ====
Year	Team	GP	GS	MPG	FG%	3P%	FT%	RPG	APG	SPG	BPG	PPG
2018–19	L.A. Lakers	22	0	5.5	.152	.000	.600	1.1	.7	.4	.2	.9
2019–20	Washington	**66**	**49**	**18.9**	**.504**	**.352**	**.812**	**3.4**	**1.2**	**.7**	**.3**	**5.0**
2020–21	Washington	40	8	10.8	.370	.277	.625	1.7	.6	.3	.2	2.0
2021–22	Toronto	15	0	4.6	.231	.250	.625	.5	.3	.5	.1	.8
Career		143	57	13.1	.432	.300	.759	2.2	.8	.5	.3	3.1

==== Playoffs ====
Year	Team	GP	GS	MPG	FG%	3P%	FT%	RPG	APG	SPG	BPG	PPG
2021	Washington	**4**	0	2.5	.000	—	—	—	—	—	**.2**	0.0
2022	Toronto	1	0	**3.0**	—	—	**1.000**	**1.0**	—	—	—	**2.0**
Career		5	0	2.6	.000	.000	1.000	.2	—	—	.2	0.4

=== Basketball Champions League ===
Year	Team	GP	GS	MPG	FG%	3P%	FT%	RPG	APG	SPG	BPG	PPG
2016–17	Skyliners Frankfurt	4	0	3.2	.000	—	—	—	.5	.7	—	0.0
Career		4	0	3.2	.000	—	—	—	.5	.7	—	0.0

=== Domestic leagues ===
Year	Team	League	GP	MPG	FG%	3P%	FT%	RPG	APG	SPG	BPG	PPG
2016–17	(Germany) Skyliners Juniors	ProB	21	27.7	.385	.230	.695	6.2	3.9	1.2	.7	10.5
2016–17	(Germany) Skyliners Frankfurt	BBL	15	9.0	.370	.000	.333	1.2	.5	.5	.1	1.4
2017–18	(Germany) Skyliners Juniors	ProB	7	26.5	.458	.259	.900	5.0	3.0	2.4	.7	14.3
2017–18	(Germany) Skyliners Frankfurt	BBL	33	21.3	.420	.343	.921	3.1	2.3	1.0	.4	6.0
2018–19	(United States) South Bay Lakers	G League	31	28.1	.432	.344	.816	6.2	2.7	1.2	1.1	11.9
2021–22	(United States) Raptors 905	G League	24	28.0	.447	.297	.784	9.5	3.6	1.2	.8	13.2
2022–23	(Germany) Bayern Munich	BBL	35	22.0	.475	.407	.750	5.1	1.7	.6	.3	8.8
2023–24	(Germany) Bayern Munich	BBL	41	19.6	.508	.447	.786	4.6	1.7	.7	.7	8.3

== National team career ==
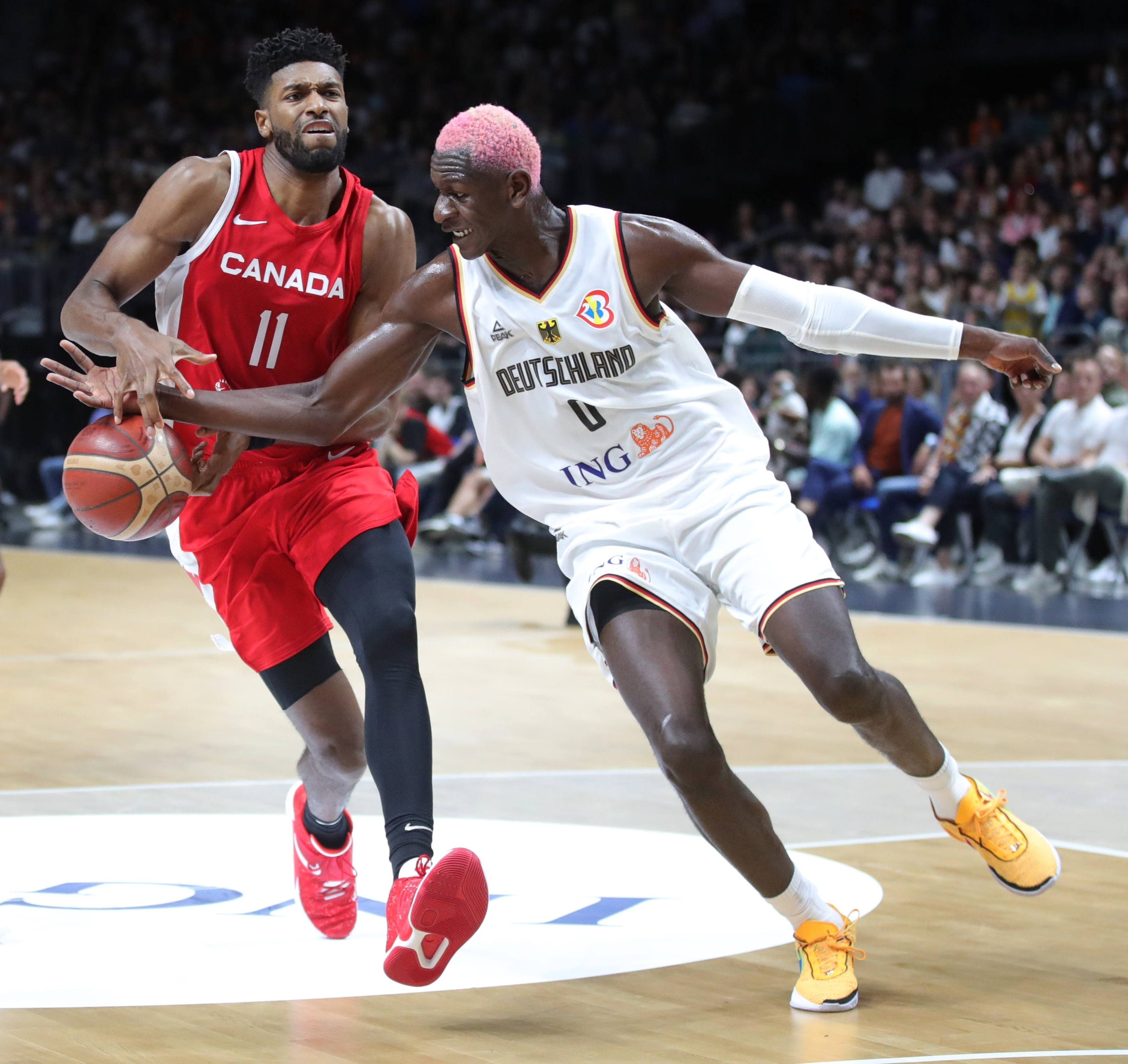
Bonga swipes the ball away from Canada's Kyle Alexander during a 2023 game.

Bonga played at both the 2014 FIBA Europe Under-16 Championship and the 2015 FIBA Europe Under-16 Championship for the German under-16 national team. In 2017, he participated in the 2017 FIBA Under-19 Basketball World Cup with the German under-19 national team, averaging 6.6 points in seven contests en route to a fifth-place finish.

In November 2017, he was named to the senior German men's national team roster for the first time in his career, to take part in the qualifiers for the 2019 FIBA Basketball World Cup. Aged 18 and three months, he made his German senior national team debut on February 23, 2018, in a World Cup qualifier against Serbia, becoming the youngest German player to play for the senior team in 40 years. Bonga played for Germany at the 2020 Summer Olympics in Tokyo. In four appearances (four starts) at the Olympics, he averaged 8 points, 4.8 rebounds and 2.5 assists per contest.
