= McKinley Wright IV =

American basketball player (born 1998)

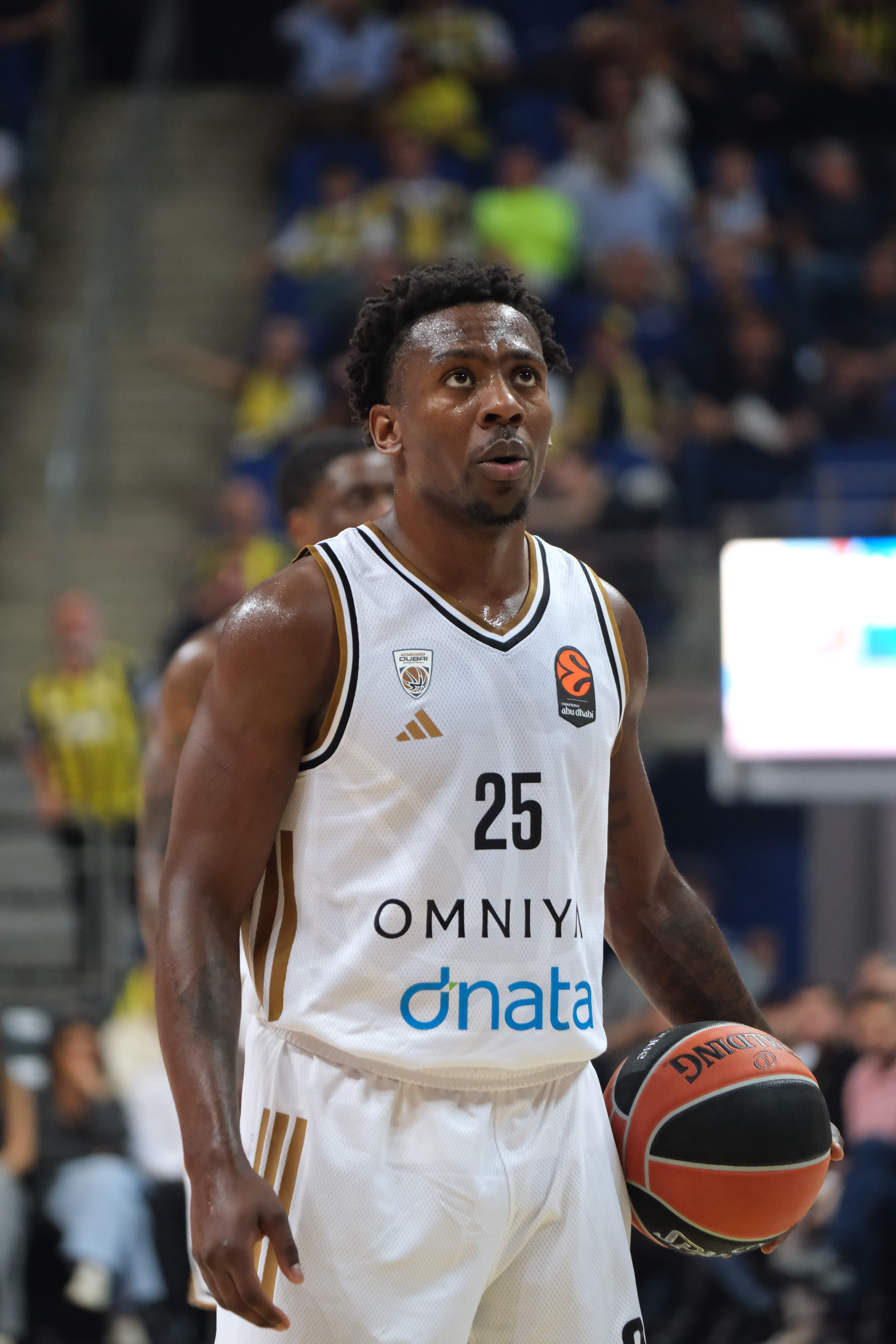
- Wright with Dubai in 2025

No. 25 – Dubai Basketball
- Position: Point guard
- League: ABA League; EuroLeague

Personal information
- Born: October 25, 1998 (age 28) Minneapolis, Minnesota, U.S.
- Listed height: 5 ft 11 in (1.80 m)
- Listed weight: 192 lb (87 kg)

Career information
- High school: Champlin Park (Champlin, Minnesota)
- College: Colorado (2017–2021)
- NBA draft: 2021: undrafted
- Playing career: 2021–present

Career history
- 2021–2022: Minnesota Timberwolves
- 2021–2022: →Iowa Wolves
- 2022–2023: Dallas Mavericks
- 2022–2023: →Texas Legends
- 2023–2025: Budućnost
- 2025–present: Dubai

Career highlights
- ABA League champion (2026); ABA League MVP (2025); All-ABA League Team (2025); Montenegrin League champion (2024); Montenegrin Cup winner (2025); 3× First-team All-Pac-12 (2019–2021); Pac-12 All-Defensive Team (2020); Pac-12 All-Freshman Team (2018); Minnesota Mr. Basketball (2017)
- Stats at NBA.com
- Stats at Basketball Reference

McKinley Wright IV (born October 25, 1998) is an American professional basketball player for Dubai Basketball of the ABA League and the EuroLeague. He played college basketball for the Colorado Buffaloes.

== Early life ==
Wright is the son of McKinley Wright III and grew up in Champlin, Minnesota. Wright attended Champlin Park High School and averaged 23 points, eight rebounds and seven assists per game in his senior season. He led the team to a 31–1 record and the 4A title game, losing to Apple Valley High School. Wright had 30 points in a state quarterfinal victory over Chaska High School. He was named 2017 Minnesota Mr. Basketball. He initially committed to Dayton but reopened his recruiting after coach Archie Miller was hired by Indiana. In April 2017, Wright committed to Colorado.

== College career ==
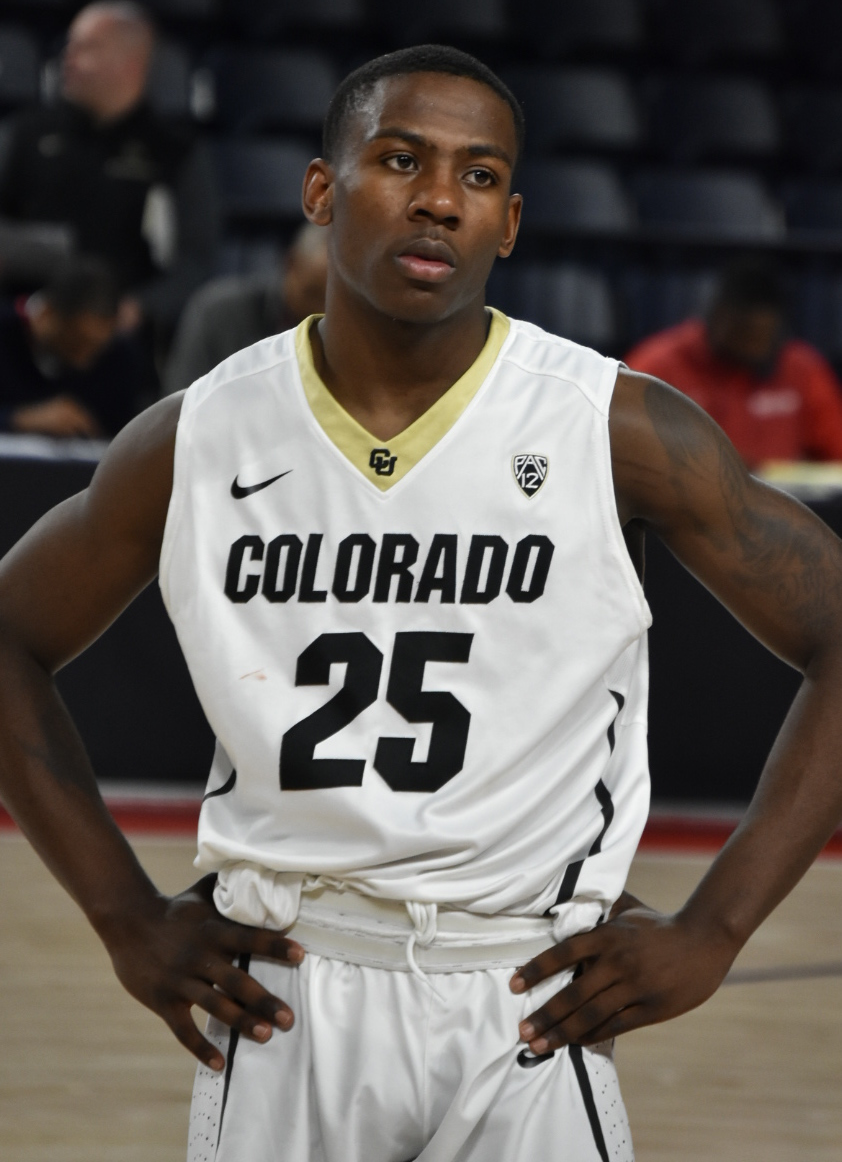
Wright while playing for Colorado Buffaloes, in November 2017

On December 15, 2017, Wright set career highs in points (30) and assists (11) as the Buffaloes defeated South Dakota State 112–103 in double overtime. As a freshman, Wright averaged 14.2 points, 5.5 assists, and 4.7 rebounds per game on a team that finished 17–15. Wright was named to the Pac-12 Conference All-Freshman Team while earning honorable mention to both the All-Pac-12 Team and All-Defensive Team. His 175 assists broke Chauncey Billups' record of 143 assists for a freshman. After the season, he worked out with Billups to improve his jump shot. As a sophomore, Wright was named first-team All-Pac-12.

Wright averaged 13 points and 4.8 assists per game despite nursing a left shoulder so tender that he slept on his back to keep it from being painful. He had corrective surgery after the season to fix a torn labrum. Wright had a season-high 29 points in a 78–76 overtime win over Dayton, receiving jeers from fans of the school he originally signed with out of high school. At the conclusion of the regular season, Wright was named to the All-Pac-12 first team and the Pac-12 All-Defensive Team. As a junior, Wright averaged 14.4 points, 5.7 rebounds and 5.0 assists per game. After the season, Wright declared for the 2020 NBA draft. On August 1, he announced he was withdrawing from the draft to return for his senior season. As a senior, he averaged 15.2 points, 4.3 rebounds, 5.7 assists and 1.1 steals per game, earning Pac-12 All-First Team honors. Following the season, Wright declared for the 2021 NBA draft, forgoing his extra year of college eligibility due to the COVID-19 pandemic.

== Professional career ==
=== Minnesota Timberwolves / Iowa Wolves (2021–2022) ===
After going undrafted in the 2021 NBA draft, Wright signed a two-way contract with the Minnesota Timberwolves on August 6, 2021, splitting time with their G League affiliate, the Iowa Wolves.

=== Dallas Mavericks / Texas Legends (2022–2023) ===
Wright joined the Phoenix Suns for the 2022 NBA Summer League. In September 2022, he was signed by the Dallas Mavericks. After training camp, his contract was converted to a two-way contract on October 15, 2022.

=== Budućnost VOLI (2023–2025) ===
On July 22, 2023, Wright signed with Budućnost VOLI of the Montenegrin League. In his debut season with Budućnost, Wright averaged 10.5 points, 4.3 assists and 2 rebounds on 46.3% shooting from the field, over 30 ABA League games.

During the 2024–25 season, Wright improved his numbers, averaging 12.8 points, 4.9 assists and 2.4 points on 54.5% shooting from the field, over 30 ABA League games. For his performances throughout the season, he was named the ABA League MVP; he was also named the ABA League Ideal Starting Five.

=== Dubai Basketball (2025–present) ===
On July 10, 2025, Wright signed a two-year contract with Dubai Basketball of the ABA League and the EuroLeague. In his first season with Dubai, he was named MVP of the month of February of the 2025–26 EuroLeague.

== Career statistics ==
Legend
GP	Games played	GS	Games started	MPG	Minutes per game
FG%	Field goal percentage	3P%	3-point field goal percentage	FT%	Free throw percentage
RPG	Rebounds per game	APG	Assists per game	SPG	Steals per game
BPG	Blocks per game	PPG	Points per game	**Bold**	Career high

=== NBA ===
Year	Team	GP	GS	MPG	FG%	3P%	FT%	RPG	APG	SPG	BPG	PPG
2021–22	Minnesota	5	0	3.8	**.667**	**.500**	—	.0	.6	.0	.0	1.0
2022–23	Dallas	**27**	**1**	**12.4**	.469	.321	**.684**	**1.7**	**2.1**	**.3**	**.2**	**4.2**
Career		32	1	11.1	.475	.333	.684	1.5	1.9	.3	.2	3.7

=== College ===
Year	Team	GP	GS	MPG	FG%	3P%	FT%	RPG	APG	SPG	BPG	PPG
2017–18	Colorado	32	31	32.6	.451	.304	.770	4.7	**5.5**	1.0	**.4**	14.2
2018–19	Colorado	**35**	**35**	32.4	**.494**	**.365**	.807	4.9	4.8	**1.1**	.2	13.0
2019–20	Colorado	32	32	**34.9**	.448	.336	.792	**5.7**	5.0	**1.1**	.3	14.4
2020–21	Colorado	32	32	32.6	.480	.301	**.844**	4.3	**5.7**	**1.1**	.3	**15.2**
Career		131	130	33.1	.467	.328	.803	4.9	5.2	1.1	.3	14.2
