= Dragan Bajić =

Bosnian basketball coach

- Bajić as head coach of BC Vienna in 2026

BC Vienna
- Title: Head coach
- League: Superliga; ABA League

Personal information
- Born: 24 May 1973 (age 53) Bludenz, Austria
- Listed height: 1.87 m (6 ft 2 in)

Career information
- NBA draft: 1995: undrafted
- Playing career: 1991–2003
- Position: Guard
- Coaching career: 2003–present

Career history

Playing
- –2003: Potkozarje / Igokea

Coaching
- 2007–2011: Igokea (assistant)
- 2008: Igokea (interim)
- 2011–2013: Igokea
- 2015: Cherno More Port Varna
- 2015–2018, 2019–2023: Igokea
- 2024–2025: Sutjeska
- 2026–present: BC Vienna

Dragan Bajić (Serbian Cyrillic: Драган Бајић; born 24 May 1973) is a Bosnian professional basketball coach and former player.

== Early life ==
Bajić was born in Bludenz, Austria, in a Bosnian Serb family.

== Playing career ==
=== Basketball ===
Bajić played for Igokea Aleksandrovac during his playing career. In the 2000–01 season, he won the Bosnian League with them. He was a team member during the 2001–02 FIBA Saporta Cup and the 2002–03 FIBA Europe Regional Challenge Cup.

=== Football ===
Bajić played professional football as forward for Sloga Trn of the Republika Srpska First League.

== Coaching career ==
In 2009, Bajić started his coaching career at Igokea as the first-team head coach. Later he was an assistant coach of Igokea to the head coach Drago Karalić.

In 2014, Bajić became the head coach of Bosnia and Herzegovina national under-18 team. He led the team to 12th place at the 2014 Europe U-18 Championship. From January to December 2015, he coached Cherno More Port Varna of the Bulgarian League.

At the end of December 2015, he came back to Igokea where he became the head coach. He made interesting results in ABA League and Bosnian League. He won three Bosnian League championships with Igokea so far. On 2 April 2018, Igokea fired Bajić after the team posted a 7–15 record at the end of the 2017–18 ABA season.

On 30 October 2019, Igokea was hired Bajić as the new head coach. On 9 June 2020, Bajić signed a three-year contract extension for Igokea. He resigned on 14 January 2023, following a 5-in-a-row losses in the ABA League.

In August 2024, Bajić became the head coach of Sutjeska from Nikšić; he left the club for private reasons at the end of January 2025. In September 2025, he joined the Austrian club BC Vienna as sporting director, and in July 2026 he became the team's head coach.

=== National teams ===
In April 2021, the Basketball Federation of North Macedonia hired Bajić as the new head coach of the North Macedonia national team. In July 2022, he parted ways with the national team.

== Career achievements and awards ==
As player

- Bosnian League champion: 1 (with Igokea: 2000–01)
- First League of Republika Srpska champion: 2 (with Igokea: 1999–00, 2000–01)

As head coach

- Bosnian League champion: 4 (with Igokea: 2012–13, 2015–16, 2016–17, 2021–22)
- Bosnian Cup winner: 6 (with Igokea: 2012–13, 2015–16, 2016–17, 2017–18, 2020–21, 2021–22)
- Bulgarian Cup winner: 1 (with Cherno More: 2015)

Individual

- Adriatic League Coach of the Season – 2013, 2021
