= ABA League Defensive Player of the Year =

The ABA League Defensive Player of the Year award is an annual award given by the ABA League (the top-tier regional professional basketball league for clubs from the former Yugoslavia) to the best performing defensive player throughout the course of the regular season.

The award was introduced during the 2020–21 season. The winner is determined by a combined voting process of head coaches of the ABA League teams, sports journalists, and basketball fans, with the coaches' votes carrying the highest weight (85% of the total voting results).

== Winners ==
Season	Player	Position	Nationality	Club	Ref.
2020–21	Branko Lazić	SG	Serbia	Crvena zvezda	
2021–22	Branko Lazić (2)	SG	Serbia	Crvena zvezda	
2022–23	Mathias Lessort	C	France	Partizan	
2023–24	Branko Lazić (3)	SG	Serbia	Crvena zvezda	
2024–25	Isaac Bonga	SF	Germany	Partizan	
2025–26	Isaac Bonga (2)	SF	Germany	Partizan	
