= Bogoljub Marković =

Serbian basketball player (born 2005)

No. 23 – Milwaukee Bucks
- Position: Power forward
- League: NBA

Personal information
- Born: 12 July 2005 (age 21) Užice, Serbia and Montenegro
- Listed height: 6 ft 10 in (2.08 m)
- Listed weight: 210 lb (95 kg)

Career information
- NBA draft: 2025: 2nd round, 47th overall pick
- Drafted by: Milwaukee Bucks
- Playing career: 2023–present

Career history
- 2023–2026: Mega Basket
- 2023–2024: →OKK Beograd
- 2026–present: Milwaukee Bucks
- 2026: →Wisconsin Herd

Career highlights
- ABA League MVP (2026); All-ABA League Team (2026); 2× ABA League Top Prospect (2025, 2026); ABA League rebounding leader (2026); Euroleague NGT champion (2022); Nike Hoop Summit (2025)
- Stats at NBA.com
- Stats at Basketball Reference
Medals
Men's basketball
Representing Serbia
FIBA U18 European Championship
Gold medal – first place	2023 Serbia	Team

Bogoljub Marković (Serbian Cyrillic: Богољуб Марковић; born 12 July 2005) is a Serbian professional basketball player for the Milwaukee Bucks of the National Basketball Association (NBA). Standing at 2.11 m (6 ft 11 in), he plays the power forward and center positions. He also represents the Serbia national team. In the 2025 NBA draft, Markovic was selected with the 47th pick by the Milwaukee Bucks.

== Professional career ==
=== Mega Basket (2023–2026) ===
In October 2023, Mega Basket loaned Marković to OKK Beograd for the 2023–24 Basketball League of Serbia. Over 28 regular-season games, he averaged 17.9 points, 9.1 rebounds, and 2.1 assists per game. Marković was named to the All-First Team Basketball League of Serbia and was the leading rebounder of the regular season.

On 26 April 2024, Marković declared for the 2024 NBA draft, but later withdrew. He was selected with the 47th overall pick by the Milwaukee Bucks in the second round of the 2025 NBA draft. He then joined the Bucks' summer league roster, where he averaged eight points, 2.2 rebounds, and four assists in five games. After the Summer League conclusion, Markovic opted to return to Serbia and play for his former team, Mega Basket, with plans of becoming better so he can return to the NBA. Marković finished the season averaging 18.2 points, 2.5 assists, and a league-leading 9.1 rebounds. On May 8, 2026, Marković won the ABA League MVP award and the Top Prospect Award.

=== Milwaukee Bucks (2026–present) ===
On July 1, 2026, Marković signed a four-year, $9.3 million contract with the Milwaukee Bucks. On October 28, 2026, Marković made his NBA debut, where he scored two points in five minutes in a 100-132 loss to the Houston Rockets.

== National team career ==
Marković was a member of the Serbian under-18 team that won the gold medal at the 2023 FIBA U18 European Championship in Serbia. Over seven tournament games, he averaged 14.1 points, seven rebounds, and 1.7 assists per game. He was selected to the All-Star Five Team of the championship.

On 24 November 2024, Marković made his debut for the Serbian senior national team in a win against Denmark in Belgrade during the EuroBasket 2025 qualification.

== See also ==
- List of NBA drafted players from Serbia
- List of Serbian NBA players
