= Dubai Basketball =

- League: ABA League; EuroLeague
- Founded: 2023
- History: Dubai Basketball; 2024–present
- Arena: Coca-Cola Arena
- Capacity: 17,000
- Location: Dubai, United Arab Emirates
- President: Salem Bin Dasmal
- General manager: Dejan Kamenjašević
- Team manager: Nenad Banjanin
- Head coach: Xavi Pascual
- Team captain: Klemen Prepelič
- Affiliations: Dubai Basketball Academy; Vojvodina; Čačak 94
- Championships: 1 ABA League
- Website: dubaibasketball.com
Home	Away

Dubai Basketball is a professional basketball club based in Dubai, United Arab Emirates. It currently competes in the ABA League and the EuroLeague. The club plays its home games at the Coca-Cola Arena.

Founded in 2023, the club entered the EuroLeague in 2025. Despite being located in UAE, it doesn't compete in the UAE National Basketball League. The club colours are brown, black and white.

== History ==
Dubai Basketball was founded by Abdulla Saeed Juma Al Naboodah and Dejan Kamenjašević in 2023. In January 2024, the ABA League confirmed Dubai Basketball's inclusion for a three-season term. The club’s entry into the ABA League was part of an initiative to develop basketball in the region. In May 2024, the club launched a partnership with Shabab Al Ahli Club. Jurica Golemac was signed as the first head coach, while Nate Mason was the first signed player. Dāvis Bertāns became the first NBA-experienced player to join the club. Dubai BC announced that the 17,000 seater Coca-Cola Arena would serve as their home arena.

In their first ABA game, on September 22, 2024, Dubai defeated Red Star Belgrade at home. They also notably defeated Partizan, Zadar and Cedevita Olimpija, securing a place in the playoffs. They were eliminated by Partizan Belgrade in the semifinals. The club first competed in the European top-tier EuroLeague for the 2025–26 season, after getting a five–year license to participate. For its debut season, Dubai had a player budget of €16 million. In their second ABA season, Dubai Basketball made history by winning the 2025/26 title against Partizan Belgrade.

== Home venue ==
In summer of 2024, Dubai Basketball announced the Coca-Cola Arena as its home venue. The arena, with a seating capacity of 15,000, hosts all home games during the EuroLeague and the ABA League seasons.

== Players ==
=== Current roster ===
Note: Flags indicate national team eligibility at FIBA-sanctioned events. Players may hold other non-FIBA nationalities not displayed.

Dubai Basketball roster
Players
Coaches

Pos.	No.	Nat.	Name	Ht.	Wt.	Age
G	0	(France)	Okobo, Élie	1.91 m (6 ft 3 in)	86 kg (190 lb)	29 – 23 October 1997
SF	1	(United States)	Anderson, Justin (injured)	1.96 m (6 ft 5 in)	105 kg (231 lb)	33 – 19 November 1993
SF	2	(Serbia)	Dangubić, Nemanja	2.04 m (6 ft 8 in)	98 kg (216 lb)	33 – 13 April 1993
SF	3	(United States)	Bacon, Dwayne	1.98 m (6 ft 6 in)	100 kg (220 lb)	31 – 30 August 1995
F	4	(United States)	Blossomgame, Jaron	2.01 m (6 ft 7 in)	100 kg (220 lb)	33 – 16 September 1993
SG	6	(United States)	Mintz, Davion	1.93 m (6 ft 4 in)	88 kg (194 lb)	28 – 30 June 1998
SG	7	(Slovenia)	Prepelič, Klemen (C)	1.91 m (6 ft 3 in)	90 kg (198 lb)	34 – 20 October 1992
F	8	(Latvia)	Bertāns, Dāvis (injured)	2.11 m (6 ft 11 in)	102 kg (225 lb)	34 – 12 November 1992
PG	9	(Brazil) (Italy)	Huertas, Marcelinho	1.91 m (6 ft 3 in)	93 kg (205 lb)	43 – 25 May 1983
G	11	(Bosnia and Herzegovina) (Serbia)	Kondić, Kosta (injured)	1.93 m (6 ft 4 in)	101 kg (223 lb)	25 – 5 August 2001
SG	13	(Bosnia and Herzegovina)	Musa, Džanan (injured)	2.05 m (6 ft 9 in)	101 kg (223 lb)	27 – 8 May 1999
C	14	(France)	Jaiteh, Mam (injured)	2.11 m (6 ft 11 in)	112 kg (247 lb)	31 – 27 November 1994
C	17	(Canada)	Kabengele, Mfiondu	2.06 m (6 ft 9 in)	113 kg (249 lb)	29 – 14 August 1997
F/C	21	(Guinea)	Diakite, Mamadi	2.06 m (6 ft 9 in)	103 kg (227 lb)	29 – 21 January 1997
PF	23	(Georgia (country))	Shengelia, Tornike	2.06 m (6 ft 9 in)	109 kg (240 lb)	35 – 5 October 1991
PG	25	(United States)	Wright IV, McKinley	1.80 m (5 ft 11 in)	87 kg (192 lb)	28 – 25 October 1998
F/C	30	(Serbia)	Petrušev, Filip	2.11 m (6 ft 11 in)	106 kg (234 lb)	26 – 15 April 2000
G	44	(United States) (Greece)	Walkup, Thomas	1.93 m (6 ft 4 in)	92 kg (203 lb)	33 – 30 December 1992

Head coach

- (Spain) Xavi Pascual

Assistant coach(es)

- (Spain) Íñigo Zorzano
- (Spain) Òscar Orellana
- (Greece) Adamantios Panagiotopoulos
- (Bosnia and Herzegovina) Velibor Njegovanović
- (Slovenia) Jan Šentjurc

Strength & conditioning coach(es)

- (Italy) Roberto Iezzi
- (Turkey) Oğulcan Aydoğan

Team manager

- (Serbia) Nenad Banjanin

Legend

- (C) Team captain
- (IN) Inactive
- Injured

- Roster
Updated: November 20, 2026

=== Depth chart ===
Pos.	Starting 5	Bench 1	Bench 2	Bench 3	Inactive
C	Mfiondu Kabengele	Filip Petrušev	Mamadi Diakite		Mam Jaiteh (injured)
PF	Tornike Shengelia	Jaron Blossomgame			Dāvis Bertāns (injured)
SF	Dwayne Bacon	Nemanja Dangubić			Justin Anderson (injured)
SG	Thomas Walkup	Davion Mintz		Klemen Prepelič	Džanan Musa (injured)
PG	McKinley Wright IV	Élie Okobo	Marcelinho Huertas		Kosta Kondić (injured)

=== Players out on loan ===
Players out on loan
Nat.	Player	Position	Team	On loan since	Source
(Serbia)	Aleksa Avramović	G	(Turkey) Bahçeşehir Koleji	16 July 2026	
(Netherlands)	Yannick Kraag	SF	(Spain) Joventut Badalona	5 August 2026	
(Angola)	Kevin Kokila	FC	(Italy) Virtus Bologna	5 August 2026	
(Germany)	Simonas Lukošius	GF	(Spain) Unicaja Málaga	17 August 2026	
(Bosnia and Herzegovina)	Kenan Kamenjaš	C	(Spain) Baskonia	11 November 2026	

=== Squad changes for/during 2026–27 season ===
==== In ====
No.	Pos.	Nat.	Name	Moving from	
0	G	(France)	Élie Okobo	AS Monaco	(France)
4	F	(United States)	Jaron Blossomgame	AS Monaco	(France)
6	SG	(United States)	Davion Mintz	Würzburg	(Germany)
9	PG	(Brazil) (Italy)	Marcelinho Huertas	Tenerife	(Spain)
21	F/C	(Guinea)	Mamadi Diakite	Baskonia	(Spain)
23	PF	(Georgia (country))	Tornike Shengelia	FC Barcelona	(Spain)
44	G	(Greece)	Thomas Walkup	Olympiacos	(Greece)
—	SF	(Netherlands)	Yannick Kraag	Joventut Badalona	(Spain)
—	F/C	(France) (Angola)	Kevin Kokila	JL Bourg	(France)
—	G/F	(Lithuania) (Germany)	Simonas Lukošius	Rytas Vilnus	(Lithuania)

==== Out ====
No.	Pos.	Nat.	Name	Moving to	
1	PG	(United States)	Nate Mason	Zenit Saint Petersburg	(Russia)
5	SF	(Italy)	Awudu Abass	Virtus Bologna	(Italy)
9	G	(United States)	Boogie Ellis	Joventut Badalona	(Spain)
22	PG	(Australia)	Taran Armstrong	Tasmania JackJumpers	(Australia)
32	F	(United States)	Matt Ryan	Maxima Roma	(Italy)
51	C	(Brazil)	Bruno Caboclo	Hapoel Tel Aviv	(Israel)

== Coaches ==
- (Slovenia) Jurica Golemac (2024–2026)
- (Slovenia) Aleksander Sekulić (2026)
- (Spain) Xavi Pascual (2026–present)

== Season by season ==
Season	ABA League	Pos.	W–L	European competitions		
2024–25	Semifinalist	3rd	28–8			
2025–26	Champions	1st	28–5	1 EuroLeague	11th	19–19
