= Mfiondu Kabengele =

Canadian basketball player (born 1997)

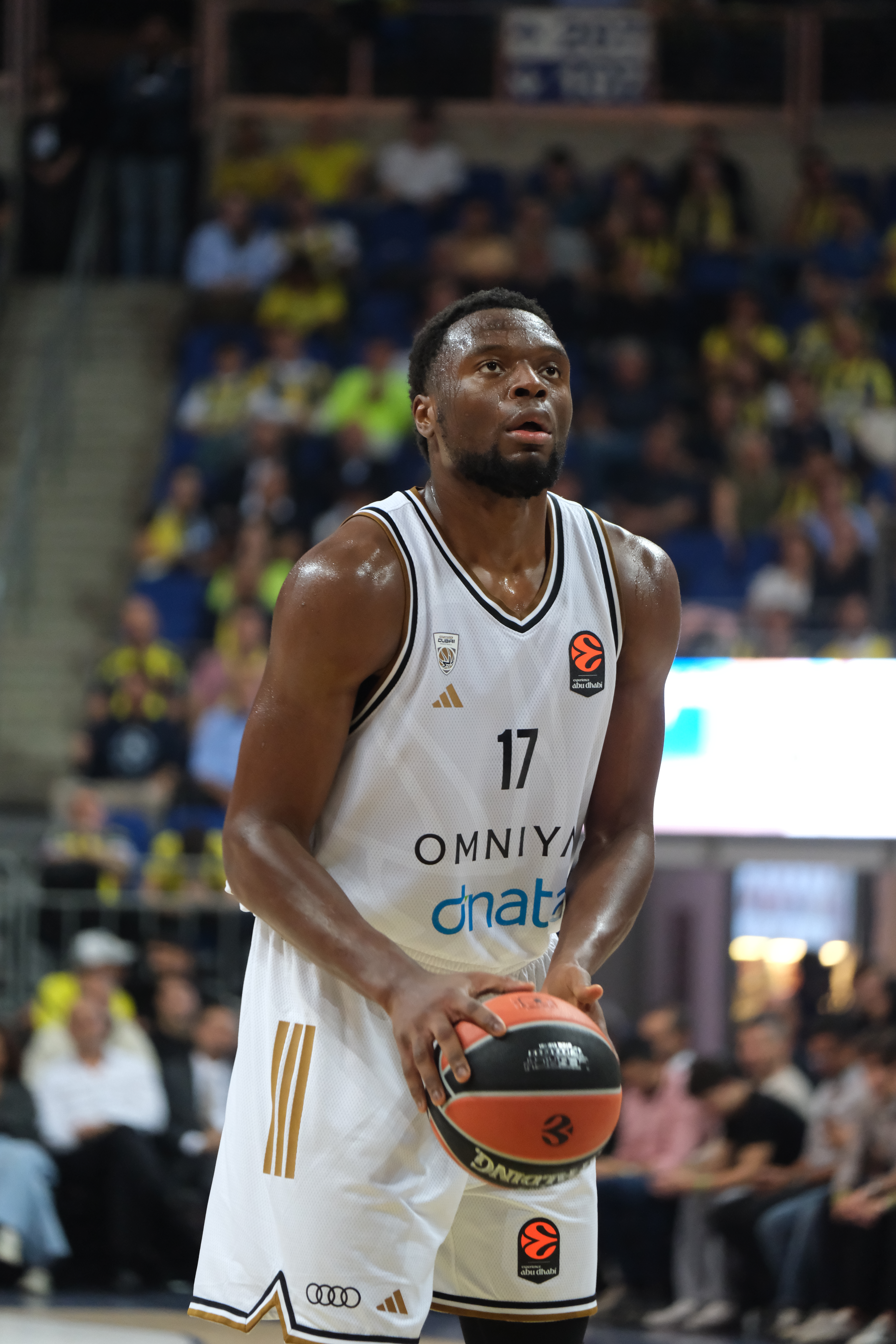
- Kabengele with Dubai Basketball in 2025

No. 17 – Dubai Basketball
- Position: Center / power forward
- League: ABA League; EuroLeague

Personal information
- Born: August 14, 1997 (age 29) Burlington, Ontario, Canada
- Listed height: 6 ft 9 in (2.06 m)
- Listed weight: 250 lb (113 kg)

Career information
- High school: Corpus Christi (Burlington, Ontario); Bosco Institute (Crown Point, Indiana)
- College: Florida State (2017–2019)
- NBA draft: 2019: 1st round, 27th overall pick
- Drafted by: Brooklyn Nets
- Playing career: 2019–present

Career history
- 2019–2021: Los Angeles Clippers
- 2019–2020: →Agua Caliente Clippers
- 2021: Cleveland Cavaliers
- 2021–2022: Rio Grande Valley Vipers
- 2022–2023: Boston Celtics
- 2022–2023: →Maine Celtics
- 2023: AEK Athens
- 2024–2025: Venezia
- 2025–present: Dubai Basketball

Career highlights
- All-EuroCup First Team (2025); EuroCup rebounding leader (2025); ABA League champion (2026); ABA League Finals MVP (2026); All-ABA League Team (2026); Lega Serie A rebounding leader (2025); Greek All-Star (2023); NBA G League champion (2022); All-NBA G League Second Team (2023); NBA G League All-Defensive Team (2023); ACC Sixth Man of The Year (2019)
- Stats at NBA.com
- Stats at Basketball Reference

Mfiondu Tshimanga Kabengele (born August 14, 1997) is a Canadian professional basketball player for Dubai Basketball of the ABA League and EuroLeague. He played college basketball for the Florida State Seminoles.

== College career ==
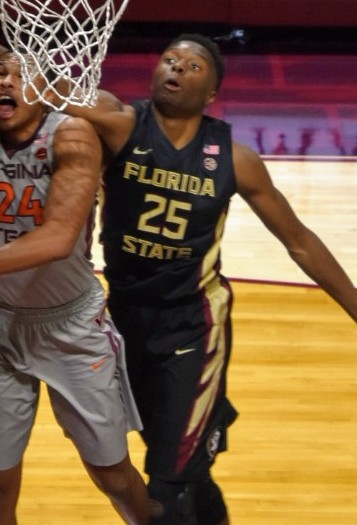
Kabengele with Florida State

Kabengele came to Florida State as an unheralded recruit and redshirted his freshman season. As a redshirt freshman, he played an important role on a team that reached the Elite Eight, averaging 7.2 points and 4.6 rebounds per game. In his sophomore year, Kabengele led the team in scoring with 13.2 points per game along with 5.9 rebounds and 1.5 blocks per game despite not starting a single contest. He was named ACC Sixth Man of the Year. During the NCAA Tournament, Kabengele averaged 17.0 points, 8.0 rebounds, and 2.0 blocks per game. On April 9, 2019, he declared for the NBA draft, thus forgoing his remaining two years of collegiate eligibility.

== Professional career ==
=== Los Angeles Clippers (2019–2021) ===
On June 20, 2019, Kabengele was selected by the Brooklyn Nets with the 27th pick of the 2019 NBA draft, and his draft right was later traded to the Los Angeles Clippers in exchange for a future first-round pick in the 2020 NBA draft and the draft rights to the 56th pick of the 2019 NBA draft, Jaylen Hands. On July 9, 2019, the Clippers announced that they had signed Kabengele. On October 24, 2019, Kabengele made his debut in NBA, coming off the bench in a 141–122 win over the Golden State Warriors with three points, a rebound and a block. On November 16, 2019, Kabengele recorded 10 points and two rebounds in a 150–101 blowout win against the Atlanta Hawks. Kabengele posted 25 points, 12 rebounds, three assists, three blocks and two steals on assignment for the G League's Agua Caliente Clippers in a 112–102 loss to the Rio Grande Valley Vipers on January 14, 2020. He recorded 38 points, 12 rebounds, and a block on January 19 in a G League win over the Stockton Kings. He worked to establish a three-point shot from the professional distance, in the G League.

On March 22, 2021, Kabengele, along with a 2022 second-round pick belonging to the Atlanta Hawks, was traded to the Sacramento Kings for the Kings' 2022 second-round pick. Three days later, he was waived.

=== Cleveland Cavaliers (2021) ===
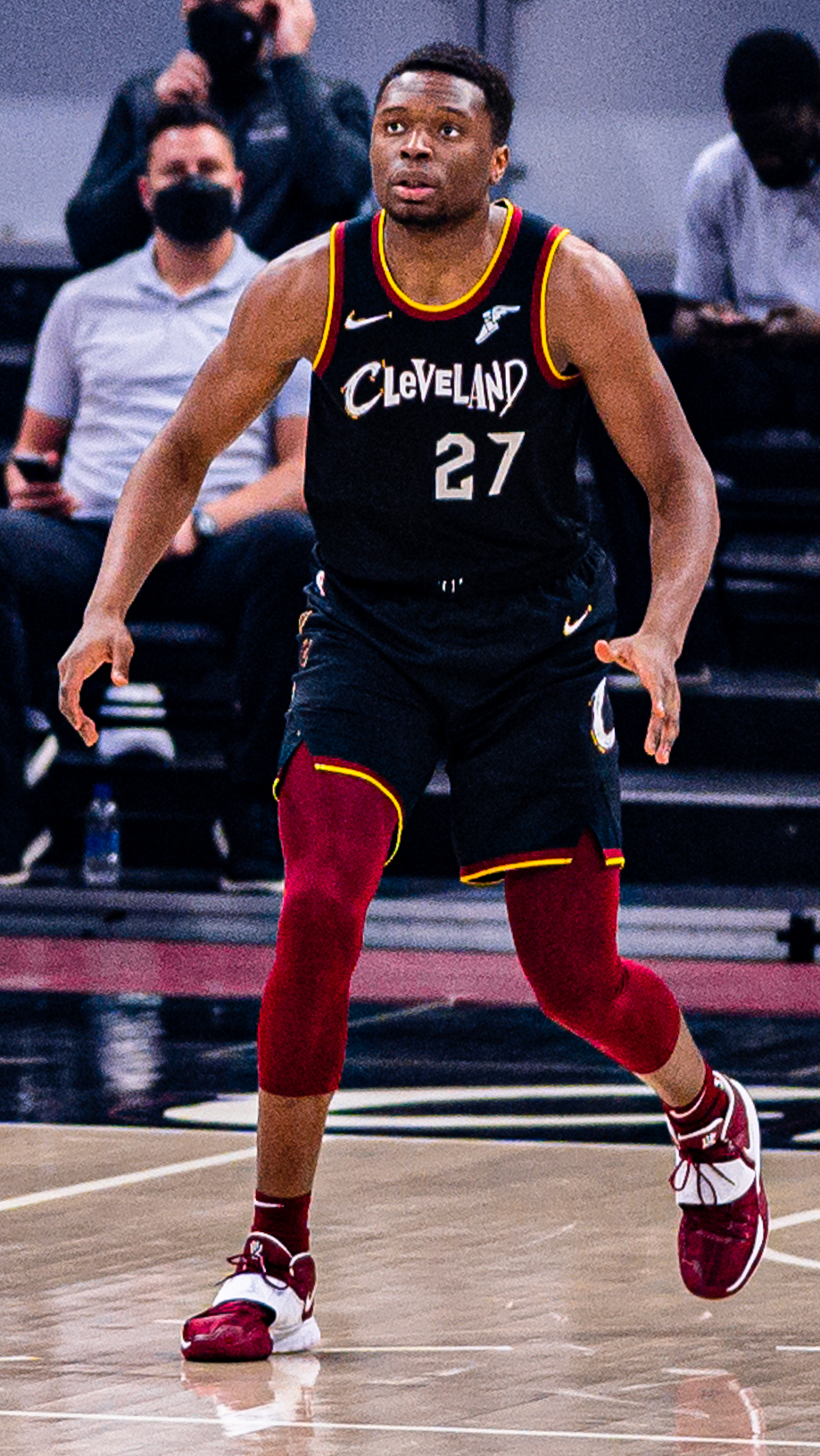
Kabengele with the Cleveland Cavaliers in 2021

On April 10, 2021, Kabengele signed a 10-day contract with the Cleveland Cavaliers. On April 21, he signed a second 10-day contract. On May 1, he signed a multi-year contract. On May 9, Kabengele logged a career-high 14 points on 5-of-7 shooting from the field and 1-of-2 from three, along with four rebounds and one assist across a career-high 23 minutes of play in a 124–97 loss to the Dallas Mavericks. On October 12, 2021, the Cleveland Cavaliers waived Kabengele.

=== Rio Grande Valley Vipers (2021–2022) ===
On October 17, 2021, Kabengele signed with the Houston Rockets, but was waived shortly thereafter. He subsequently joined the Rio Grande Valley Vipers of the NBA G League.

=== Boston Celtics (2022–2023) ===
On July 16, 2022, Kabengele signed a two-way contract with the Boston Celtics after an impressive showing during Summer League Play. On March 27, 2023, he was named the G League Player of the Week after averaging 27 points, 16.5 rebounds and 2.0 assists. On April 13, Kabengele was named to the All-NBA G League Second Team and the NBA G League All-Defensive Team.

=== AEK Athens (2023) ===
On August 13, 2023, Kabengele signed with AEK Athens of the Greek Basket League, his first European club. On November 25, 2023, Kabengele recorded a monstrous statsheet of 30 points, 16 rebounds, 3 assists, 3 steals and 2 blocks in a 90–70 blowout win over rivals PAOK. On December 26, 2023, his contract with AEK was terminated. He averaged 14 points, 8 rebounds and 1.2 blocks per game in domestic competition, as well as 10.5 points, 6.3 rebounds and 1.5 blocks in the BCL.

=== Reyer Venezia (2023–2025) ===
After his contract with AEK was terminated, Kabengele signed with Italian side Reyer Venezia. Initially he was signed until the end of the 2023–2024 season, and was later re-signed for the 2024-2025 campaign.

=== Dubai Basketball (2025–present) ===
On May 29, 2025, Kabengele signed with Dubai Basketball of the ABA League and EuroLeague. In 68 appearances for the team, he averaged 13.9 points, 6.1 rebounds, and 1.3 assists. On July 6, 2026, the team extended his contract until 2028.

== Career statistics ==
Legend
GP	Games played	GS	Games started	MPG	Minutes per game
FG%	Field goal percentage	3P%	3-point field goal percentage	FT%	Free throw percentage
RPG	Rebounds per game	APG	Assists per game	SPG	Steals per game
BPG	Blocks per game	PPG	Points per game	**Bold**	Career high

=== NBA ===
Year	Team	GP	GS	MPG	FG%	3P%	FT%	RPG	APG	SPG	BPG	PPG
2019–20	L.A. Clippers	12	0	5.3	**.438**	**.450**	**1.000**	.9	.2	.2	.2	3.5
2020–21	L.A. Clippers	**23**	0	4.1	.281	.222	.833	.6	.2	.1	.1	1.2
2020–21	Cleveland	16	0	**11.6**	.421	.281	.786	**2.9**	**.8**	.4	**.6**	**4.3**
2022–23	Boston	4	0	9.0	.286	.000	**1.000**	2.5	.0	**.5**	.0	1.5
Career		55	0	6.9	.383	.301	.852	1.5	.3	.2	.3	2.6

=== College ===
Year	Team	GP	GS	MPG	FG%	3P%	FT%	RPG	APG	SPG	BPG	PPG
2017–18	Florida State	34	0	14.8	.491	**.385**	.657	4.6	**.3**	.4	.9	7.2
2018–19	Florida State	**37**	0	**21.6**	**.502**	.369	**.761**	**5.9**	**.3**	**.6**	**1.5**	**13.2**
Career		71	0	18.3	.498	.374	.724	5.3	.3	.5	1.2	10.3

== Personal life ==
Kabengele's parents Tshilongo and Tshimanga Kabengele are originally from the Democratic Republic of the Congo but moved to Canada for educational reasons. His maternal uncle was Dikembe Mutombo, a Basketball Hall of Fame inductee who played in the National Basketball Association (NBA) for 18 years. Kabengele was an international affairs major at Florida State University, and is fluent in French. He converted to Islam in 2023.
