= ABA League Coach of the Season =

Annual European sporting award in basketball

The ABA League Coach of the Season award, also known as the Adriatic League Coach of the Season award, is an annual award given by the Adriatic League (ABA League), which is a European regional league, that is the top-tier level professional basketball league for clubs from the Former Yugoslavia. The award is given to the league's best head coach. The inaugural award was given out in the 2013–14 ABA season.

== Award winners ==
ABA League Coach of the Season
- Sport: Basketball
- League: ABA League

History
- First award: 2012–13
- Editions: 9
- First winner: Dragan Bajić
- Most wins: 2 Dejan Radonjić; Dragan Bajić; Željko Obradović
- Most recent: Zvezdan Mitrović (2025–26)

Year	Winner	Club(s)	Ref.
2012–13	(Bosnia and Herzegovina) Dragan Bajić	(Bosnia and Herzegovina) Igokea	
2013–14	(Montenegro) Dejan Radonjić	(Serbia) Crvena zvezda Telekom	
2014–15	(Montenegro) Dejan Radonjić (2)	(Serbia) Crvena zvezda Telekom	
2015–16	Not awarded		
2016–17	Not awarded		
2017–18	Not awarded		
2018–19	Not awarded		
2019–20	Not awarded		
2020–21	(Bosnia and Herzegovina) Dragan Bajić (2)	(Bosnia and Herzegovina) Igokea	
2021–22	(Serbia) Željko Obradović	(Serbia) Partizan NIS	
2022–23	(Serbia) Željko Obradović (2)	(Serbia) Partizan Mozzart Bet	
2023–24	(Croatia) Danijel Jusup	(Croatia) Zadar	
2024–25	(Slovenia) Andrej Žakelj	(Montenegro) Budućnost VOLI	
2024–25	(Montenegro) Zvezdan Mitrović	(Slovenia) Cedevita Olimpija	

== See also ==
- List of ABA League-winning coaches
