= 2024–25 ABA League First Division =

Basketball league in south-east Europe

AdmiralBet ABA League
- Season: 2024–25
- Duration: 20 September 2024 – 5 May 2025 (Regular season); 9 May 2025 – 12 June 2025 (Play-offs)
- Games played: 30 fixtures (240 total)
- Teams: 16
- TV partners: Arena Sport, Kanal A, TVCG 2

Regular season
- Top seed: (Basketball Federation of Montenegro) Budućnost VOLI
- Season MVP: (United States) McKinley Wright

Finals
- Champions: (Basketball Federation of Serbia) Partizan Mozzart Bet (8th title)
- Runners-up: (Basketball Federation of Montenegro) Budućnost VOLI
- Semi-finalists: (United Arab Emirates Basketball Association) Dubai Basketball (Basketball Federation of Serbia) Crvena zvezda Meridianbet
- Finals MVP: (United States) Tyrique Jones

Awards
- Top Prospect: (Serbia) Bogoljub Marković
- Best Defensive Player: (Germany) Isaac Bonga
- Best Coach: (Slovenia) Andrej Žakelj

Statistical leaders
| Points | (United States) Bryce Jones | 18.4 |
| Rebounds | (Bosnia and Herzegovina) Kenan Kamenjaš | 7.7 |
| Assists | (United States) Tayler Persons | 7.9 |
| Steals | (United States) Diante Baldwin | 1.7 |
| Blocks | (France) Joan Beringer | 1.5 |
| Efficiency | (United States) Bryce Jones | 21.5 |

Records
- Biggest home win: Partizan 110–64 Split (30 November 2024)
- Biggest away win: Mornar 69–110 Crvena zvezda (20 January 2025)
- Highest scoring: SC Derby 111–109 Igokea (30 March 2025)
- Lowest scoring: Zadar 71–58 SC Derby (25 January 2025)
- Winning streak: 13 games Dubai Basketball
- Losing streak: 16 games Mornar Barsko zlato

The 2024–25 AdmiralBet ABA League was the 24th season of the ABA League and the first season after the expansion to 16 teams. Apart from teams from Bosnia and Herzegovina, Croatia, Montenegro, Serbia, and Slovenia, a new team, Dubai Basketball, from the United Arab Emirates played in the competition as well. This was the first time since the 2014–15 season that a team outside the territory of the former Yugoslavia competed in the league.

== Promotion and relegation ==
| Promoted | (Basketball Federation of Serbia) Spartak Office Shoes | 2023–24 ABA 2 Champion |
| Affiliation | (United Arab Emirates Basketball Association) Dubai Basketball | 3-year licence |
| Relegated | No teams were relegated. | |

== Venues and locations ==
Location of teams in the 2024–25 season
Locations of the teams from Belgrade in the 2024–25 season
Location of the team Dubai in the 2024–25 season

| Team | Home city | Arena | Capacity |
|---|---|---|---|
| (Basketball Federation of Serbia) Borac Mozzart | Čačak | Borac Hall | 4,000 |
| (Basketball Federation of Montenegro) Budućnost VOLI | Podgorica | Morača Sports Center | 6,000 |
| (Basketball Federation of Slovenia) Cedevita Olimpija | Ljubljana | Arena Stožice | 12,480 |
| (Croatian Basketball Federation) Cibona | Zagreb | Dražen Petrović Hall | 5,400 |
| (Basketball Federation of Serbia) Crvena zvezda Meridianbet | Belgrade | Aleksandar Nikolić Hall | 8,000 |
| (United Arab Emirates Basketball Association) Dubai Basketball | Dubai | Coca-Cola Arena | 17,000 |
| (Basketball Federation of Serbia) FMP Soccerbet | Belgrade | Železnik Hall | 3,000 |
| (Basketball Federation of Bosnia and Herzegovina) Igokea m:tel | Aleksandrovac | Laktaši Sports Hall | 3,050 |
| (Slovenia) Krka | Novo Mesto | Leon Štukelj Hall | 2,500 |
| (Basketball Federation of Serbia) Mega Superbet | Belgrade | Ranko Žeravica Sports Hall | 5,000 |
| (Basketball Federation of Montenegro) Mornar Barsko zlato | Bar | Topolica Sport Hall | 2,625 |
| (Basketball Federation of Serbia) Partizan Mozzart Bet | Belgrade | Belgrade Arena | 18,386 |
| (Basketball Federation of Montenegro) SC Derby | Podgorica | Morača Sports Center | 6,000 |
| (Basketball Federation of Serbia) Spartak Office Shoes | Subotica | Dudova Šuma Hall | 2,000 |
| (Croatian Basketball Federation) Split | Split | Arena Gripe | 3,500 |
| (Croatian Basketball Federation) Zadar | Zadar | Krešimir Ćosić Hall | 7,997 |

=== Personnel and sponsorship ===
| Team | Head coach | Captain | Kit manufacturer | Shirt sponsor |
|---|---|---|---|---|
| Borac Mozzart | (Basketball Federation of Serbia) Saša Ocokoljić | (Basketball Federation of Serbia) Uroš Čarapić | | MozzartSport / P.S. Fashion |
| Budućnost VOLI | (Basketball Federation of Slovenia) Andrej Žakelj | (Basketball Federation of Montenegro) Aleksa Ilić | Spalding | VOLI / Podgorica Capital City |
| Cedevita Olimpija | (Basketball Federation of Montenegro) Zvezdan Mitrović | (Basketball Federation of Slovenia) Jaka Blažič | Adidas | Cedevita |
| Cibona | (Croatian Basketball Federation) Josip Sesar | (Croatian Basketball Federation) Krešimir Radovčić | GBT | Erste Bank |
| Crvena zvezda Meridianbet | (Hellenic Basketball Federation) Ioannis Sfairopoulos | (Basketball Federation of Serbia) Branko Lazić | Adidas | Meridian / mts |
| Dubai Basketball | (Basketball Federation of Slovenia) Jurica Golemac | (Basketball Federation of Slovenia) Klemen Prepelič | Adidas | |
| FMP Soccerbet | (Basketball Federation of Serbia) Saša Nikitović | (Basketball Federation of Serbia) Ognjen Kuzmić | Adidas | Soccerbet |
| Igokea m:tel | (Basketball Federation of Serbia) Nenad Stefanović | (Basketball Federation of Serbia) Dragan Milosavljević | GBT | m:tel |
| Krka | (Basketball Federation of Slovenia) Dejan Jakara | (Basketball Federation of Slovenia) Jan Špan | | Krka |
| Mega Superbet | (Basketball Federation of Serbia) Marko Barać | (Basketball Federation of Bosnia and Herzegovina) Kosta Kondić | Adidas | Medical Innovation Solutions |
| Mornar Barsko zlato | (Basketball Federation of Montenegro) Mihailo Pavićević | (Basketball Federation of Montenegro) Milija Miković | DaCapo | Bar Municipality / Barsko zlato |
| Partizan Mozzart Bet | (Basketball Federation of Serbia) Željko Obradović | (Basketball Federation of Serbia) Vanja Marinković | Under Armour | NIS / Mozzart Bet |
| SC Derby | (Basketball Federation of Montenegro) Petar Mijović | (Basketball Federation of Montenegro) Nikola Pavličević | Spalding | Derby |
| Spartak Office Shoes | (Basketball Federation of Serbia) Vlada Jovanović | (Basketball Federation of Serbia) Miloš Milisavljević | | Office Shoes |
| Split | (Croatian Basketball Federation) Veljko Mršić | (USA Basketball) Shannon Shorter | Macron | Groupama |
| Zadar | (Croatian Basketball Federation) Danijel Jusup | (Croatian Basketball Federation) Marko Ramljak | Macron | OTP Bank / PSK |

=== Coaching changes ===
| Team | Outgoing manager | Date of vacancy | Position in table | Replaced with | Date of appointment | Ref. |
|---|---|---|---|---|---|---|
| Igokea | (Basketball Federation of Serbia) Marko Cvetković | end of 2023–24 season | Off-season | (Basketball Federation of Serbia) Nenad Stefanović | 18 June 2024 | |
| Krka | (Basketball Federation of Slovenia) Gašper Okorn | 28 May 2024 | Off-season | (Basketball Federation of Slovenia) Dejan Jakara | 22 June 2024 | |
| Cedevita Olimpija | (Basketball Federation of Slovenia) Zoran Martič | 3 June 2024 | Off-season | (Basketball Federation of Montenegro) Zvezdan Mitrović | 3 June 2024 | |
| Cibona | (Croatian Basketball Federation) Dino Repeša | 7 June 2024 | Off-season | (USA Basketball) Chris Thomas | 29 August 2024 | |
| Borac Mozzart | (Basketball Federation of Serbia) Dejan Mijatović | 18 June 2024 | Off-season | (Basketball Federation of Serbia) Saša Ocokoljić | 5 July 2024 | |
| SC Derby | (Basketball Federation of Slovenia) Dejan Jakara | 18 June 2024 | Off-season | (Basketball Federation of Montenegro) Petar Mijović | 19 June 2024 | |
| Cibona | (USA Basketball) Chris Thomas | 13 October 2024 | 15th (1–3) | (Basketball Federation of Bosnia and Herzegovina) Bariša Krasić | 13 October 2024 | |
| Cibona | (Basketball Federation of Bosnia and Herzegovina) Bariša Krasić | 28 December 2024 | 15th (2–12) | (Croatian Basketball Federation) Josip Sesar | 28 December 2024 | |
| Split | (Croatian Basketball Federation) Slaven Rimac | 3 January 2025 | 11th (6–9) | (Croatian Basketball Federation) Veljko Mršić | 13 January 2025 | |

== Regular season ==
=== League table ===
| Pos | Team | Pld | W | L | PF | PA | PD | Pts | Qualification or relegation |
|---|---|---|---|---|---|---|---|---|---|
| 1 | (Basketball Federation of Montenegro) Budućnost VOLI | 30 | 26 | 4 | 2699 | 2320 | +379 | 56 | Advance to the Playoffs |
| 2 | (Basketball Federation of Serbia) Partizan Mozzart Bet | 30 | 26 | 4 | 2719 | 2246 | +473 | 56 | Advance to the Playoffs |
| 3 | (United Arab Emirates Basketball Association) Dubai Basketball | 30 | 25 | 5 | 2633 | 2324 | +309 | 55 | Advance to the Playoffs |
| 4 | (Basketball Federation of Serbia) Crvena zvezda Meridianbet | 30 | 23 | 7 | 2672 | 2365 | +307 | 53 | Advance to the Playoffs |
| 5 | (Basketball Federation of Bosnia and Herzegovina) Igokea m:tel | 30 | 19 | 11 | 2628 | 2599 | +29 | 49 | Advance to the Playoffs |
| 6 | (Basketball Federation of Slovenia) Cedevita Olimpija | 30 | 19 | 11 | 2545 | 2400 | +145 | 49 | Advance to the Playoffs |
| 7 | (Basketball Federation of Serbia) Spartak Office Shoes | 30 | 17 | 13 | 2563 | 2467 | +96 | 47 | Advance to the Playoffs |
| 8 | (Basketball Federation of Serbia) Mega Superbet | 30 | 16 | 14 | 2479 | 2454 | +25 | 46 | Advance to the Playoffs |
| 9 | (Croatian Basketball Federation) Zadar | 30 | 14 | 16 | 2300 | 2282 | +18 | 44 | |
| 10 | (Basketball Federation of Serbia) FMP Soccerbet | 30 | 14 | 16 | 2389 | 2551 | −162 | 44 | |
| 11 | (Basketball Federation of Montenegro) SC Derby | 30 | 11 | 19 | 2551 | 2642 | −91 | 41 | |
| 12 | (Basketball Federation of Serbia) Borac Mozzart | 30 | 10 | 20 | 2261 | 2482 | −221 | 40 | |
| 13 | (Croatian Basketball Federation) Split | 30 | 9 | 21 | 2308 | 2483 | −175 | 39 | |
| 14 | (Basketball Federation of Slovenia) Krka | 30 | 5 | 25 | 2457 | 2645 | −188 | 35 | |
| 15 | (Croatian Basketball Federation) Cibona | 30 | 4 | 26 | 2291 | 2666 | −375 | 34 | Qualification to the relegation playoffs |
| 16 | (Basketball Federation of Montenegro) Mornar Barsko zlato | 30 | 2 | 28 | 2243 | 2812 | −569 | 32 | Relegation to the Second Division |

Source: ABA League

=== Positions by round ===
| Advance to the Playoffs | Qualification to the relegation playoffs | Relegated |

| Team ╲ Round | 1 | 2 | 3 | 4 | 5 | 6 | 7 | 8 | 9 | 10 | 11 | 12 | 13 | 14 | 15 | 16 | 17 | 18 | 19 | 20 | 21 | 22 | 23 | 24 | 25 | 26 | 27 | 28 | 29 | 30 |
|---|---|---|---|---|---|---|---|---|---|---|---|---|---|---|---|---|---|---|---|---|---|---|---|---|---|---|---|---|---|---|
| (Montenegro) Budućnost VOLI | 1 | 1 | 2 | 1 | 2 | 2 | 2 | 2 | 2 | 2 | 2 | 2 | 2 | 2 | 2 | 2 | 2 | 2 | 2 | 2 | 2 | 2 | 2 | 2 | 2 | 2 | 1 | 1 | 1 | 1 |
| (Serbia) Partizan Mozzart Bet | 2 | 2 | 1 | 2 | 1 | 1 | 1 | 1 | 1 | 1 | 1 | 1 | 1 | 1 | 1 | 1 | 1 | 1 | 1 | 1 | 1 | 1 | 1 | 1 | 1 | 1 | 2 | 2 | 2 | 2 |
| (United Arab Emirates) Dubai Basketball | 8 | 4 | 6 | 4 | 4 | 3 | 3 | 4 | 4 | 4 | 4 | 4 | 4 | 4 | 4 | 4 | 4 | 4 | 4 | 4 | 4 | 4 | 4 | 4 | 3 | 3 | 3 | 3 | 3 | 3 |
| (Serbia) Crvena zvezda Meridianbet | 9 | 8 | 8 | 5 | 5 | 4 | 4 | 3 | 3 | 3 | 3 | 3 | 3 | 3 | 3 | 3 | 3 | 3 | 3 | 3 | 3 | 3 | 3 | 3 | 4 | 4 | 4 | 4 | 4 | 4 |
| (Bosnia and Herzegovina) Igokea m:tel | 7 | 5 | 7 | 10 | 7 | 6 | 7 | 9 | 6 | 6 | 7 | 6 | 6 | 7 | 6 | 5 | 5 | 6 | 6 | 6 | 5 | 5 | 5 | 5 | 6 | 6 | 6 | 6 | 6 | 5 |
| (Slovenia) Cedevita Olimpija | 13 | 14 | 10 | 9 | 12 | 12 | 12 | 14 | 12 | 10 | 9 | 8 | 8 | 9 | 9 | 7 | 6 | 5 | 5 | 5 | 6 | 6 | 6 | 6 | 5 | 5 | 5 | 5 | 5 | 6 |
| (Serbia) Spartak Subotica | 11 | 12 | 11 | 8 | 10 | 7 | 5 | 5 | 5 | 5 | 5 | 5 | 5 | 5 | 5 | 6 | 8 | 8 | 8 | 7 | 7 | 7 | 7 | 8 | 7 | 7 | 7 | 7 | 7 | 7 |
| (Serbia) Mega Superbet | 5 | 3 | 3 | 3 | 3 | 5 | 6 | 7 | 8 | 7 | 6 | 7 | 7 | 6 | 8 | 9 | 9 | 9 | 9 | 8 | 9 | 8 | 9 | 10 | 9 | 8 | 8 | 8 | 8 | 8 |
| (Croatia) Zadar | 3 | 6 | 9 | 14 | 14 | 14 | 13 | 11 | 10 | 11 | 12 | 10 | 9 | 8 | 7 | 8 | 7 | 7 | 7 | 9 | 10 | 9 | 10 | 7 | 8 | 10 | 10 | 10 | 10 | 9 |
| (Serbia) FMP Soccerbet | 4 | 9 | 5 | 6 | 6 | 8 | 9 | 8 | 11 | 8 | 8 | 9 | 10 | 10 | 10 | 10 | 10 | 10 | 10 | 10 | 8 | 10 | 8 | 9 | 10 | 9 | 9 | 9 | 9 | 10 |
| (Montenegro) SC Derby | 6 | 10 | 4 | 7 | 8 | 9 | 8 | 6 | 7 | 9 | 11 | 12 | 12 | 12 | 13 | 12 | 11 | 12 | 12 | 12 | 12 | 12 | 11 | 11 | 11 | 11 | 11 | 11 | 12 | 11 |
| (Serbia) Borac Mozzart | 15 | 7 | 13 | 13 | 13 | 13 | 11 | 12 | 13 | 14 | 14 | 14 | 14 | 13 | 12 | 13 | 13 | 11 | 11 | 11 | 11 | 11 | 13 | 13 | 13 | 13 | 12 | 12 | 11 | 12 |
| (Croatia) Split | 10 | 15 | 12 | 12 | 11 | 10 | 10 | 10 | 9 | 12 | 10 | 11 | 11 | 11 | 11 | 11 | 12 | 13 | 13 | 13 | 13 | 13 | 12 | 12 | 12 | 12 | 13 | 13 | 13 | 13 |
| (Slovenia) Krka | 12 | 13 | 15 | 11 | 9 | 11 | 14 | 13 | 14 | 13 | 13 | 13 | 13 | 14 | 14 | 14 | 14 | 14 | 14 | 14 | 14 | 14 | 14 | 14 | 14 | 14 | 14 | 14 | 14 | 14 |
| (Croatia) Cibona | 14 | 11 | 14 | 15 | 15 | 15 | 15 | 15 | 15 | 15 | 15 | 15 | 15 | 15 | 15 | 15 | 15 | 15 | 15 | 15 | 15 | 15 | 15 | 15 | 15 | 15 | 15 | 15 | 15 | 15 |
| (Montenegro) Mornar Barsko zlato | 16 | 16 | 16 | 16 | 16 | 16 | 16 | 16 | 16 | 16 | 16 | 16 | 16 | 16 | 16 | 16 | 16 | 16 | 16 | 16 | 16 | 16 | 16 | 16 | 16 | 16 | 16 | 16 | 16 | 16 |

Source: ABA League

=== Results ===
| Home \ Away | BOR | BUD | COL | CIB | CZV | DBC | FMP | IGO | KRK | MEG | MOR | PAR | SPR | SPL | SCD | ZAD |
|---|---|---|---|---|---|---|---|---|---|---|---|---|---|---|---|---|
| Borac Mozzart | — | 82–88 | 74–94 | 72–66 | 72–98 | 74–87 | 92–72 | 75–88 | 80–71 | 76–80 | 90–71 | 60–89 | 66–73 | 61–73 | 78–76 | 76–66 |
| Budućnost VOLI | 86–69 | — | 95–78 | 88–77 | 73–75 | 89–78 | 78–69 | 111–77 | 97–87 | 77–69 | 110–79 | 81–77 | 75–78 | 97–75 | 107–84 | 84–77 |
| Cedevita Olimpija | 92–56 | 71–91 | — | 96–81 | 74–69 | 84–92 | 91–58 | 85–90 | 84–82 | 93–82 | 114–72 | 71–81 | 91–82 | 76–74 | 100–86 | 80–75 |
| Cibona | 62–89 | 82–96 | 66–75 | — | 81–90 | 74–102 | 85–86 | 85–88 | 74–81 | 83–88 | 82–64 | 59–93 | 72–108 | 72–71 | 75–69 | 69–87 |
| Crvena zvezda Meridianbet | 105–85 | 89–96 | 92–86 | 88–78 | — | 92–107 | 97–63 | 91–68 | 81–69 | 81–72 | 91–72 | 89–84 | 77–78 | 96–66 | 84–107 | 87–76 |
| Dubai Basketball | 98–74 | 79–75 | 84–85 | 90–61 | 86–84 | — | 84–61 | 92–81 | 91–76 | 80–83 | 104–66 | 80–72 | 80–79 | 87–82 | 98–86 | 92–68 |
| FMP Meridian | 74–67 | 88–91 | 75–62 | 89–84 | 93–94 | 86–84 | — | 82–102 | 98–89 | 89–87 | 87–72 | 64–91 | 89–88 | 98–91 | 78–55 | 67–83 |
| Igokea m:tel | 72–79 | 71–76 | 91–78 | 95–84 | 82–92 | 88–97 | 83–70 | — | 95–92 | 90–87 | 101–97 | 80–107 | 87–76 | 92–87 | 105–97 | 94–89 |
| Krka | 79–90 | 91–99 | 87–91 | 92–97 | 67–79 | 78–93 | 106–109 | 80–85 | — | 70–80 | 103–90 | 77–79 | 87–89 | 82–73 | 97–91 | 73–81 |
| Mega Superbet | 98–74 | 93–79 | 72–81 | 88–58 | 76–81 | 66–95 | 83–80 | 64–73 | 87–94 | — | 84–59 | 90–100 | 97–90 | 84–82 | 83–81 | 75–74 |
| Mornar Barsko zlato | 90–98 | 86–84 | 82–92 | 92–85 | 69–110 | 71–83 | 76–81 | 79–114 | 78–70 | 83–113 | — | 78–105 | 66–76 | 76–86 | 74–94 | 55–81 |
| Partizan Mozzart Bet | 96–66 | 90–97 | 78–76 | 113–78 | 85–77 | 82–61 | 90–65 | 100–94 | 96–63 | 89–82 | 89–84 | — | 103–80 | 110–64 | 95–80 | 100–75 |
| Spartak Subotica | 89–80 | 82–86 | 99–90 | 88–84 | 87–94 | 84–90 | 93–86 | 86–75 | 102–83 | 110–86 | 85–64 | 80–89 | — | 82–79 | 79–89 | 87–71 |
| Split | 70–59 | 48–83 | 69–75 | 88–82 | 85–78 | 74–81 | 72–85 | 74–79 | 83–78 | 90–80 | 87–73 | 64–81 | 71–91 | — | 88–85 | 73–77 |
| SC Derby | 90–80 | 99–105 | 84–107 | 101–86 | 81–89 | 86–87 | 82–76 | 111–109 | 101–90 | 77–82 | 99–91 | 60–80 | 84–76 | 102–89 | — | 86–62 |
| Zadar | 89–67 | 55–91 | 81–73 | 82–69 | 77–84 | 63–71 | 99–71 | 76–79 | 72–63 | 65–68 | 100–69 | 71–75 | 76–66 | 81–80 | 71–58 | — |

Source: ABA League
Legend: Blue = home team win; Red = away team win.
Matches with lighter background shading were decided after overtime.

=== Results by round ===
The table lists the results of teams in each round.

| Win | Loss | Postponed |

| Team ╲ Round | 1 | 2 | 3 | 4 | 5 | 6 | 7 | 8 | 9 | 10 | 11 | 12 | 13 | 14 | 15 | 16 | 17 | 18 | 19 | 20 | 21 | 22 | 23 | 24 | 25 | 26 | 27 | 28 | 29 | 30 |
|---|---|---|---|---|---|---|---|---|---|---|---|---|---|---|---|---|---|---|---|---|---|---|---|---|---|---|---|---|---|---|
| (Montenegro) Budućnost VOLI | W | W | W | W | L | W | W | W | L | W | W | W | W | W | W | W | W | W | W | W | W | L | W | W | W | W | W | W | W | L |
| (Serbia) Partizan Mozzart Bet | W | W | W | W | W | W | W | W | W | W | W | L | L | W | W | W | W | W | W | W | W | W | L | W | W | W | L | W | W | W |
| (United Arab Emirates) Dubai Basketball | W | W | L | W | W | W | W | L | W | L | W | W | W | W | L | W | L | W | W | W | W | W | W | W | W | W | W | W | W | W |
| (Serbia) Crvena zvezda Meridianbet | L | W | L | W | W | W | W | W | W | W | W | W | W | W | W | L | W | W | W | L | W | L | W | W | L | W | W | L | W | W |
| (Slovenia) Cedevita Olimpija | L | L | W | W | L | L | L | L | W | W | W | W | W | L | W | W | W | W | W | L | L | W | W | W | W | L | W | W | L | W |
| (Bosnia and Herzegovina) Igokea m:tel | W | W | L | L | W | W | L | W | W | W | L | W | W | L | W | W | W | L | L | W | W | W | W | W | L | W | W | W | L | W |
| (Serbia) Spartak Office Shoes | L | L | W | W | L | W | W | W | W | L | L | W | W | L | W | L | L | W | L | L | W | W | L | L | W | W | L | W | W | W |
| (Serbia) Mega Superbet | W | W | W | W | L | L | L | L | L | W | W | L | W | W | L | L | L | L | W | W | L | W | L | L | W | W | W | W | W | L |
| (Serbia) FMP Soccerbet | W | L | W | L | W | L | L | W | L | W | W | W | L | L | L | L | W | L | W | W | W | L | W | L | L | W | W | L | L | L |
| (Croatia) Zadar | W | L | L | L | L | L | W | W | W | L | L | W | W | W | W | W | L | W | L | L | L | W | L | W | L | L | L | W | L | W |
| (Serbia) Borac Mozzart | L | W | L | L | W | L | W | L | L | L | L | L | L | W | W | L | W | W | L | W | L | L | L | L | L | L | W | L | W | L |
| (Montenegro) SC Derby | W | L | W | L | L | W | L | W | L | L | L | L | L | L | L | W | W | L | L | W | L | L | W | W | W | L | L | L | L | W |
| (Croatia) Split | L | L | W | L | W | W | L | L | W | L | W | L | L | W | L | L | L | L | L | L | W | L | W | L | L | L | L | L | W | L |
| (Slovenia) Krka | L | L | L | W | W | L | L | L | L | W | L | L | L | L | L | W | L | L | L | L | L | L | L | L | L | W | L | L | L | L |
| (Croatia) Cibona | L | W | L | L | L | L | L | W | L | L | L | L | L | L | L | L | L | L | W | L | L | W | L | L | L | L | L | L | L | L |
| (Montenegro) Mornar Barsko zlato | L | L | L | L | L | L | W | L | L | L | L | L | L | L | L | L | L | L | L | L | L | L | L | L | W | L | L | L | L | L |

Source: ABA League

== Playoffs ==
As in the previous season, top 8 teams advanced to playoffs, quarterfinals and semifinals were played in best-of-3 series, while finals were played in best-of-5 series.

Quarterfinals
(Montenegro) Budućnost VOLI | 2
(Serbia) Mega Superbet | 0
(Serbia) Crvena zvezda Meridian Bet | 2
(Bosnia and Herzegovina) Igokea m:tel | 0
(Serbia) Partizan Mozzart Bet | 2
(Serbia) Spartak Office Shoes | 0
(United Arab Emirates) Dubai Basketball | 2
(Slovenia) Cedevita Olimpija | 1

Semifinals
(Montenegro) Budućnost VOLI | 2
(Serbia) Crvena zvezda Meridian Bet | 1
(Serbia) Partizan Mozzart Bet | 2
(United Arab Emirates) Dubai Basketball | 1

Finals
(Montenegro) Budućnost VOLI | 1
(Serbia) Partizan Mozzart Bet | 3

=== Quarterfinals ===
| Team 1 | Series | Team 2 | Game 1 | Game 2 | Game 3 |
|---|---|---|---|---|---|
| Budućnost VOLI (Montenegro) | 2–0 | (Serbia) Mega Superbet | 96–80 | 92–87 | — |
| Crvena zvezda Meridian Bet (Serbia) | 2–0 | (Bosnia and Herzegovina) Igokea m:tel | 87–77 | 95–90 | — |
| Partizan Mozzart Bet (Serbia) | 2–0 | (Serbia) Spartak Office Shoes | 100–75 | 82–75 | — |
| Dubai Basketball (United Arab Emirates) | 2–1 | (Slovenia) Cedevita Olimpija | 86–85 | 89–94 | 85–76 |

=== Semifinals ===
| Team 1 | Series | Team 2 | Game 1 | Game 2 | Game 3 |
|---|---|---|---|---|---|
| Budućnost VOLI (Montenegro) | 2–1 | (Serbia) Crvena zvezda Meridian Bet | 104–70 | 81–100 | 81–78 |
| Partizan Mozzart Bet (Serbia) | 2–1 | (United Arab Emirates) Dubai Basketball | 102–72 | 95–100 | 114–97 |

=== Finals ===
| Team 1 | Series | Team 2 | Game 1 | Game 2 | Game 3 | Game 4 | Game 5 |
|---|---|---|---|---|---|---|---|
| Budućnost VOLI (Montenegro) | 1–3 | (Serbia) Partizan Mozzart Bet | 88–94 | 84–73 | 67–83 | 75–90 | — |

== Relegation playoffs ==
The 15th placed team of the First Division season and the runners-up of the Second Division season will play in the Qualifiers for a spot in the next First Division season.

Qualified clubs
| Leagues | Clubs |
|---|---|
| First Division | (Croatia) Cibona |
| Second Division | (Slovenia) Ilirija |

| Team 1 | Series | Team 2 | Game 1 | Game 2 | Game 3 |
|---|---|---|---|---|---|
| Cibona (Croatia) | 0–2 | (Slovenia) Ilirija | 88–93 | 66–89 | — |

== MVP List ==
=== MVP of the Round ===
| Round | Player | Team | PIR |
|---|---|---|---|
| 1 | (Bosnia and Herzegovina) Amar Gegić | (Croatia) Zadar | 32 |
| 2 | (United States) Rasheed Sulaimon | (Montenegro) Budućnost VOLI | 29 |
| 3 | (United States) Rasir Bolton | (Serbia) Spartak Office Shoes | 31 |
| 4 | (Slovenia) Miha Cerkvenik | (Slovenia) Krka | 34 |
| 5 | (United States) Shannon Shorter | (Croatia) Split | 33 |
| 6 | (United States) Shannon Shorter (2) | (Croatia) Split (2) | 27 |
| 7 | (United States) Rasir Bolton (2) | (Serbia) Spartak Office Shoes (2) | 30 |
| 8 | (Montenegro) Zoran Nikolić | (Montenegro) SC Derby | 32 |
| 9 | (Serbia) Balša Koprivica | (Serbia) Partizan Mozzart Bet | 43 |
| 10 | (Bulgaria) Codi Miller-McIntyre | (Serbia) Crvena zvezda MeridianBet | 39 |
| 11 | (Jamaica) Brynton Lemar | (Slovenia) Cedevita Olimpija | 30 |
| 12 | (United States) JaCorey Williams | (United Arab Emirates) Dubai Basketball | 33 |
| 13 | (Bosnia and Herzegovina) Kenan Kamenjaš | (Montenegro) Budućnost VOLI (2) | 37 |
| 14 | (United States) Diante Baldwin | (Serbia) Borac Mozzart | 32 |
| 15 | (United States) Terrell Carter | (Bosnia and Herzegovina) Igokea m:tel | 35 |
| 16 | (United States) Nate Mason | (United Arab Emirates) Dubai Basketball (2) | 34 |
| 17 | (Lithuania) Paulius Valinskas | (Serbia) Borac Mozzart (2) | 30 |
| 18 | (United States) Umoja Gibson | (Serbia) Spartak Office Shoes (3) | 34 |
| 19 | (Serbia) Mihailo Petrović | (Serbia) Mega Superbet | 33 |
| 20 | (Serbia) Filip Barna | (Serbia) FMP Soccerbet | 32 |
| 21 | (Serbia) Luka Cerovina | (Serbia) Spartak Office Shoes (4) | 39 |
| 22 | (Serbia) Bogoljub Marković | (Serbia) Mega Superbet (2) | 34 |
| 23 | (United States) Terrell Carter (2) | (Bosnia and Herzegovina) Igokea m:tel (2) | 34 |
| 24 | (Serbia) Balša Koprivica (2) | (Serbia) Partizan Mozzart Bet (2) | 35 |
| 25 | (Montenegro) Zoran Nikolić (2) | (Montenegro) SC Derby (2) | 40 |
| 26 | (Germany) Isaac Bonga | (Serbia) Partizan Mozzart Bet (3) | 32 |
| 27 | (United States) Bryce Jones | (Bosnia and Herzegovina) Igokea m:tel (3) | 46 |
| 28 | (Serbia) Mihailo Petrović (2) | (Serbia) Mega Superbet (3) | 37 |
| 29 | (Bosnia and Herzegovina) Kenan Kamenjaš (2) | (Montenegro) Budućnost VOLI (3) | 34 |
| 30 | (Croatia) Lovro Mazalin | (Croatia) Zadar (2) | 33 |
| QF1 | (Serbia) Aleksej Pokuševski | (Serbia) Partizan Mozzart Bet (4) | 26 |
| QF2 | (Serbia) Filip Petrušev | (Serbia) Crvena zvezda MeridianBet (2) | 31 |
| QF3 | (United States) Nate Mason (2) | (United Arab Emirates) Dubai Basketball (3) | 18 |
| SF1 | (United States) Rasheed Sulaimon (2) | (Montenegro) Budućnost VOLI (4) | 29 |
| SF2 | (Slovenia) Klemen Prepelič | (United Arab Emirates) Dubai Basketball (4) | 34 |
| SF3 | (United States) McKinley Wright | (Montenegro) Budućnost VOLI (5) | 27 |
| F1 | (United States) Tyrique Jones | (Serbia) Partizan Mozzart Bet (5) | 39 |
| F2 | (Slovenia) Alen Omić | (Montenegro) Budućnost VOLI (6) | 19 |
| F3 | (United States) Tyrique Jones (2) | (Serbia) Partizan Mozzart Bet (6) | 21 |
| F4 | (United States) Carlik Jones | (Serbia) Partizan Mozzart Bet (7) | 26 |

Source: ABA League

=== MVP of the Month ===
| Month | Player | Team | Ref. |
2024
| September & October | (Serbia) Bogoljub Marković | (Serbia) Mega MIS | |
| November | (United States) Rasir Bolton | (Serbia) Spartak Office Shoes | |
| December | (Bosnia and Herzegovina) Kenan Kamenjaš | (Montenegro) Budućnost VOLI | |
2025
| January | (United States) Bryce Jones | (Bosnia and Herzegovina) Igokea m:tel | |
| February | (Croatia) Filip Bundović | (Croatia) Cibona | |
| March | (United States) Bryce Jones (2) | (Bosnia and Herzegovina) Igokea m:tel (2) | |
| April | (United States) Bryce Jones (3) | (Bosnia and Herzegovina) Igokea m:tel (3) | |

== Awards ==
| Pos. | Player | Team | Ref. |
MVP
| PG | (United States) McKinley Wright | (Montenegro) Budućnost VOLI | |
Finals MVP
| C | (United States) Tyrique Jones | (Serbia) Partizan Mozzart Bet | |
Top Scorer
| PG | (United States) Bryce Jones | (Bosnia and Herzegovina) Igokea m:tel | |
Best Defensive Player
| SF | (Germany) Isaac Bonga | (Serbia) Partizan Mozzart Bet | |
Top Prospect
| PF | (Serbia) Bogoljub Marković | (Serbia) Mega Superbet | |
Coach of the Season
| HC | (Slovenia) Andrej Žakelj | (Montenegro) Budućnost VOLI | |
The Ideal Starting Five
| G | (United States) Bryce Jones | (Bosnia and Herzegovina) Igokea m:tel | |
| G | (United States) McKinley Wright | (Montenegro) Budućnost VOLI | |
| F | (United States) Sterling Brown | (Serbia) Partizan Mozzart Bet | |
| F | (Serbia) Filip Petrušev | (Serbia) Crvena zvezda Meridianbet | |
| C | (Bosnia and Herzegovina) Kenan Kamenjaš | (Montenegro) Budućnost VOLI | |

== Final standings ==
| Pos | Team | Pld | W | L | Qualification or relegation |
|---|---|---|---|---|---|
| 1 | (Basketball Federation of Serbia) Partizan Mozzart Bet (C) | 39 | 33 | 6 | Already qualified to EuroLeague |
| 2 | (Basketball Federation of Montenegro) Budućnost VOLI | 39 | 31 | 8 | Qualification to EuroCup |
| 3 | (United Arab Emirates Basketball Association) Dubai Basketball | 36 | 28 | 8 | Already qualified to EuroLeague |
| 4 | (Basketball Federation of Serbia) Crvena zvezda Meridianbet | 35 | 26 | 9 | Already qualified to EuroLeague |
| 5 | (Basketball Federation of Bosnia and Herzegovina) Igokea m:tel | 32 | 19 | 13 | Qualification to Champions League regular season |
| 6 | (Basketball Federation of Slovenia) Cedevita Olimpija | 33 | 20 | 13 | Qualification to EuroCup |
| 7 | (Basketball Federation of Serbia) Spartak Office Shoes | 32 | 17 | 15 | Qualification to Champions League regular season |
| 8 | (Basketball Federation of Serbia) Mega Superbet | 32 | 16 | 16 | |
| 9 | (Croatian Basketball Federation) Zadar | 30 | 14 | 16 | |
| 10 | (Basketball Federation of Serbia) FMP Soccerbet | 30 | 14 | 16 | |
| 11 | (Basketball Federation of Montenegro) SC Derby | 30 | 11 | 19 | Qualification to Champions League qualifying rounds |
| 12 | (Basketball Federation of Serbia) Borac Mozzart | 30 | 10 | 20 | |
| 13 | (Croatian Basketball Federation) Split | 30 | 9 | 21 | |
| 14 | (Basketball Federation of Slovenia) Krka | 30 | 5 | 25 | |
| 15 | (Croatian Basketball Federation) Cibona (R) | 30 | 4 | 26 | Relegation to Second Division |
| 16 | (Basketball Federation of Montenegro) Mornar Barsko zlato (R) | 30 | 2 | 28 | Relegation to Second Division |

Source: [ ]
(C) Champions; (R) Relegated

== Clubs in European competitions ==
| Competition | Team | Progress | Result |
|---|---|---|---|
| EuroLeague | (Basketball Federation of Serbia) Crvena zvezda Meridianbet | Play-in | Eliminated by (German Basketball Federation) Bayern Munich |
| EuroLeague | (Basketball Federation of Serbia) Partizan Mozzart Bet | Regular season | 12th (16–18) |
| EuroCup | (Basketball Federation of Slovenia) Cedevita Olimpija | Quarterfinals | Eliminated by (Turkish Basketball Federation) Bahçeşehir Koleji |
| EuroCup | (Basketball Federation of Montenegro) Budućnost VOLI | Eightfinals | Eliminated by (Turkish Basketball Federation) Türk Telekom |
| Champions League | (Basketball Federation of Bosnia and Herzegovina) Igokea m:tel | Regular season Group A | 4th (2–4) |
| Champions League | (Basketball Federation of Serbia) FMP Soccerbet | Regular season Group H | 4th (1–5) |
| Champions League | (Basketball Federation of Serbia) Spartak Office Shoes | Qualification rounds – Quarter-finals | Eliminated by (Lithuanian Basketball Federation) BC Juventus |
