= 2025–26 KK Partizan season =

Serbian basketball club season

Partizan Mozzart Bet
2025–26 season
- President: (Serbia) Ostoja Mijailović
- Head coach: (Serbia) Željko Obradović (until 29 November) (Serbia) Mirko Ocokoljić (interim, 29 November – 23 December) (Spain) Joan Peñarroya (from 23 December)
- Arena: Belgrade Arena
- ABA League: Runner-up
- Serbian League: Semi-final
- EuroLeague: 15th
- Serbian Cup: Semi-final
- Highest home attendance: 21,854 vs (Serbia) Crvena zvezda (12 December 2025)
- Average home attendance: 15,280 (in EuroLeague)
- Biggest win: 96–56 vs (Bosnia and Herzegovina) Bosna BH Telecom (30 March 2026)
- Biggest defeat: 68–109 vs (Lithuania) Žalgiris Kaunas (19 December 2025)
Home	Away
- All statistics correct as of 13 June 2026.

In the 2025–26 season, Partizan competes in the Serbian League, Radivoj Korać Cup, ABA League and EuroLeague.

== Players ==
=== Current roster ===
Note: Flags indicate national team eligibility at FIBA-sanctioned events. Players may hold other non-FIBA nationalities not displayed.

Partizan Mozzart Bet roster
Players
Coaches

Pos.	No.	Nat.	Name	Ht.	Wt.	Age
PG	1	(South Sudan)	Jones, Carlik	1.83 m (6 ft 0 in)	82 kg (181 lb)	28 – 23 December 1997
G	2	(United States)	Milton, Shake (injured)	1.96 m (6 ft 5 in)	93 kg (205 lb)	30 – 26 September 1996
F	3	(Finland)	Muurinen, Miikka (IN)	2.10 m (6 ft 11 in)	92 kg (203 lb)	19 – 4 March 2007
G	4	(Germany) (United States)	Washington, Duane	1.88 m (6 ft 2 in)	89 kg (196 lb)	26 – 24 March 2000
F/C	5	(Germany)	Osetkowski, Dylan	2.06 m (6 ft 9 in)	109 kg (240 lb)	30 – 8 August 1996
SF	7	(Serbia)	Nakić, Mario	2.02 m (6 ft 8 in)	97 kg (214 lb)	25 – 14 June 2001
SF	8	(Serbia)	Bošnjaković, Mitar	2.01 m (6 ft 7 in)	90 kg (198 lb)	20 – 24 August 2006
G/F	9	(Serbia)	Marinković, Vanja (injured) (C)	1.99 m (6 ft 6 in)	90 kg (198 lb)	29 – 9 January 1997
SG	10	(Serbia)	Mijailović, Uroš (Y)	1.95 m (6 ft 5 in)		18 – 6 March 2008
PF	11	(Serbia)	Pokuševski, Aleksej	2.13 m (7 ft 0 in)	95 kg (209 lb)	24 – 26 December 2001
G/F	12	(United States)	Brown, Sterling	1.96 m (6 ft 5 in)	99 kg (218 lb)	31 – 10 February 1995
G/F	13	(Serbia)	Radanov, Aleksa	2.01 m (6 ft 7 in)	95 kg (209 lb)	28 – 1 February 1998
F	17	(Germany)	Bonga, Isaac	2.03 m (6 ft 8 in)	95 kg (209 lb)	26 – 8 November 1999
G/F	19	(Serbia)	Lakić, Arijan	1.98 m (6 ft 6 in)	95 kg (209 lb)	26 – 20 January 2000
C	23	(Nigeria)	Jekiri, Tonye	2.13 m (7 ft 0 in)	118 kg (260 lb)	32 – 23 July 1994
C	24	(Angola)	Fernando, Bruno	2.08 m (6 ft 10 in)	109 kg (240 lb)	28 – 15 August 1998
PG	33	(Greece)	Calathes, Nick	1.98 m (6 ft 6 in)	97 kg (214 lb)	37 – 7 February 1989
C	77	(France)	Lauvergne, Joffrey	2.11 m (6 ft 11 in)	118 kg (260 lb)	35 – 30 September 1991

Head coach

- (Spain) Joan Peñarroya

Assistant coach(es)

- (Serbia) Mirko Ocokoljić
- (Serbia) Aleksandar Matović
- (Serbia) Uroš Dragićević
- (Serbia) Luka Milinković

Athletic trainer(s)

- (Serbia) Predrag Zimonjić

Team manager

- (Serbia) Aleksandar Mitrović

Legend

- (C) Team captain
- (IN) Inactive
- (Y) Youth player
- (TW) Two-way affiliate player
- Injured

- Roster
- Transactions
Updated: May 9, 2026

=== Players with multiple nationalities ===
- (United States) (South Sudan) Carlik Jones
- (Germany) (United States) Duane Washington
- (United States) (Germany) Dylan Osetkowski
- (Serbia) (Croatia) Mario Nakić
- (Germany) (Democratic Republic of the Congo) Isaac Bonga
- (Greece) (United States) Nick Calathes
- (France) (Serbia) Joffrey Lauvergne

=== Depth chart ===
Pos.	Starting 5	Bench 1	Bench 2	Bench 3	Inactive
C	Bruno Fernando	Tonye Jekiri			Joffrey Lauvergne
PF	Dylan Osetkowski	Aleksej Pokuševski			Miikka Muurinen
SF	Isaac Bonga	Arijan Lakić	Mario Nakić	Mitar Bošnjaković	Vanja Marinković (injured)
SG	Sterling Brown	Duane Washington	Aleksa Radanov	Uroš Mijailović	Shake Milton (injured)
PG	Carlik Jones	Nick Calathes

=== On loan ===
Players out on loan
Nat.	Player	Position	Team	On loan since
(Serbia)	Đorđe Šekularac	SG	(Serbia) Metalac Valjevo (Two-way affiliate)	3 September 2025
(Romania)	Luca Illeș	PG	(Serbia) Metalac Valjevo (Two-way affiliate)	3 September 2025
(Serbia)	Uroš Danilović	GF	(Serbia) Metalac Valjevo (Two-way affiliate)	3 September 2025
(United States)	Jabari Parker	PF	(Spain) Joventut Badalona	26 February 2026

=== Roster changes ===
==== In ====
No.	Pos.	Nat.	Name	Moving from		Type	Date	Source
5	F/C	(United States) (Germany)	Dylan Osetkowski	Unicaja	(Spain)	End of contract	27 June 2025	
22	PF	(United States)	Jabari Parker	FC Barcelona	(Spain)	Parted ways	27 June 2025	
2	G	(United States)	Shake Milton	Los Angeles Lakers	(United States)	End of contract	24 July 2025	
21	G/F	(Serbia)	Đorđe Šekularac	Youth system	(Serbia)	Senior contact	12 August 2025	
44	G/F	(Serbia)	Uroš Danilović	Youth system	(Serbia)	Senior contact	15 September 2025	
3	F	(Finland)	Miikka Muurinen	AZ Compass Prep	(United States)	Senior contact	26 September 2025	
24	C	(Angola)	Bruno Fernando	Real Madrid	(Spain)	Parted ways	26 October 2025	
33	PG	(Greece)	Nick Calathes	AS Monaco	(France)	Parted ways	29 October 2025	
15	G	(United States)	Cameron Payne	New York Knicks	(United States)	End of contract	23 December 2025	
23	C	(Nigeria)	Tonye Jekiri	CSKA Moscow	(Russia)	Parted ways	5 January 2026	
13	G/F	(Serbia)	Aleksa Radanov	Bayern Munich	(Germany)	End of contract	28 January 2026	
10	SG	(Serbia)	Uroš Mijailović	Youth system	(Serbia)	Senior contact	8 March 2026	
77	C	(France)	Joffrey Lauvergne	Kuwait SC	(Kuwait)	Parted ways	15 April 2026	

==== Out ====
No.	Pos.	Nat.	Name	Moving to		Type	Date	Source
27	C	(Serbia)	Aleksa Dimitrijević	Creighton Bluejays	(United States)	Free transfer	24 June 2025	
0	C	(United States) (Uganda)	Brandon Davies	Alvark Tokyo	(Japan)	End of contract	26 June 2025	
5	C	(Serbia)	Balša Koprivica	Bahçeşehir Koleji	(Turkey)	End of contract	27 June 2025	
24	PF	(Canada)	Isiaha Mike	Bayern Munich	(Germany)	End of contract	22 August 2025	
3	G	(France)	Frank Ntilikina	Olympiacos	(Greece)	Transfer	26 September 2025	
1	G	(Denmark)	Gabriel Lundberg	Maccabi Tel Aviv	(Israel)	Parted ways	8 November 2025	
88	C	(United States)	Tyrique Jones	Olympiacos	(Greece)	Transfer	5 January 2026	
15	G	(United States)	Cameron Payne	Philadelphia 76ers	(United States)	Transfer	16 February 2026	
22	PF	(United States)	Jabari Parker	Joventut Badalona	(Spain)	Loan	26 February 2026	

== Competitions ==
=== Overall ===
Competition	Started round	Final position / round	First match	Last match
ABA League	Matchday 1	Runner-up	6 October 2025	12 June 2026
Serbian SuperLeague	Quarterfinals	Semi-final	30 April 2026	29 May 2026
EuroLeague	Matchday 1	15th	30 September 2025	16 April 2026
Radivoj Korać Cup	Quarterfinals	Semi-final	19 February 2026	20 February 2026

Updated to match played 13 June 2026
Source: Competitions

=== Overview ===
Competition	Record							
Competition	Pld	W	D	L	PF	PA	PD	Win %
ABA League	32	26	0	6	2,882	2,575	+307	81.25
Serbian SuperLeague	3	2	0	1	245	224	+21	66.67
EuroLeague	38	16	0	22	3,101	3,289	−188	42.11
Radivoj Korać Cup	2	1	0	1	153	170	−17	50.00
Total	75	45	0	30	6,381	6,258	+123	60.00

Last updated: 13 June 2026
Source: Competitions

== Pre-season and friendlies ==
Win Loss

6 September 2025	Napoli Basket (Italy)	83–101	(Serbia) Partizan	Lucca
18:30	Scoring by quarter: 17–26, 20–29, 27–29, 19–17
partplus.rs	Pts: Flagg 19; Rebs: Croswell 10; Asts: Bolton 5	Boxscore	Pts: Washington, Brown, Parker 17; Rebs: Osetkowski 8 Asts: Pokuševski 3	Arena: PalaTagliate

7 September 2025	Virtus Bologna (Italy)	70–99	(Serbia) Partizan	Lucca
21:00	Scoring by quarter: 22–22, 19–26, 12–26, 17–25
partplus.rs	Pts: Morgan 16; Rebs: Morgan 6 Asts: Taylor 5		Pts: Washington 34; Rebs: T. Jones 7 Asts: Washington, Bošnjaković 2	Arena: PalaTagliate

12 September 2025	Partizan (Serbia)	96–87	(Greece) PAOK	Belgrade
18:30	Scoring by quarter: 28–16, 25–32, 20–21, 23–18
partplus.rs	Pts: Washington 21; Rebs: Osetkowski 10; Asts: Brown 4		Pts: Brown 24; Rebs: Melvin 9 Asts: Brown 5	Arena: Tašmajdan Stadium

13 September 2025	Partizan (Serbia)	96–103	(Israel) Maccabi Tel Aviv	Belgrade
19:00	Scoring by quarter: 19–24, 26–16, 25–35, 26–28
partplus.rs	Pts: Washington 18; Rebs: Osetkowski, Brown, Milton 3 Asts: Brown 4		Pts: Dowtin 19; Rebs: Rayman 9 Asts: Dowtin 6	Arena: Aleksandar Nikolić Hall; Attendance: 4,500

18 September 2025	Panathinaikos AKTOR Athens (Greece)	91–82	(Serbia) Partizan	Melbourne
11:30	Scoring by quarter: 20–27, 17–17, 25–14, 29–24
EuroLeague TV, partplus.rs	Pts: Nunn 21; Rebs: Yurtseven 13; Asts: Nunn 8	Boxscore	Pts: Washington 19; Rebs: Parker 8 Asts: Brown 5	Arena: John Cain Arena; Attendance: 10,500

21 September 2025	Partizan (Serbia)	93–90	(Australia) Sydney Kings	Sydney
8:30	Scoring by quarter: 30–23, 20–23, 19–20, 24–24
EuroLeague TV, partplus.rs	Pts: Parker 24; Rebs: Brown 12; Asts: C. Jones 5	Boxscore	Pts: Galloway 20; Rebs: Cooks 13; Asts: Dellavedova 10	Arena: Qudos Bank Arena

== ABA League ==
=== Regular season ===
==== Group A ====
Pos	Team	Pld	W	L	PF	PA	PD	Pts	Qualification or relegation
1	(United Arab Emirates Basketball Association) Dubai Basketball	16	15	1	1409	1195	+214	31	Advance to Top 8
2	(Basketball Federation of Serbia) Partizan Mozzart Bet	16	15	1	1473	1297	+176	31	Advance to Top 8
3	(Romanian Basketball Federation) U-BT Cluj-Napoca	16	10	6	1488	1403	+85	26	Advance to Top 8
4	(Basketball Federation of Bosnia and Herzegovina) Igokea m:tel	16	8	8	1363	1433	−70	24	Advance to Top 8
5	(Basketball Federation of Serbia) FMP	16	6	10	1325	1385	−60	22	Advance to Play-out

Source: ABA League

==== Matches ====
Win Loss

6 October 2025 1	Partizan (Serbia)	84–78	(Slovenia) Krka	Belgrade
18:00	Scoring by quarter: 21–12, 21–16, 19–31, 23–19
Arena Sport	Pts: Marinković 15; Rebs: Osetkowski, Pokuševski, T. Jones 5 Asts: Milton 5 PIR: Pokuševski, Marinković 15	Report	Pts: Bailey Jr. 29; Rebs: Urbiha 7 Asts: Bačvić 8 PIR: Bailey Jr. 29	Arena: Belgrade Arena; Attendance: 6,436; Referees: Damir Javor, Tomislav Vovk, Ivan Stefanović

11 October 2025 2	Split (Croatia)	81–86	(Serbia) Partizan	Split
18:00	Scoring by quarter: 15–8, 19–30, 19–26, 28–22
Arena Sport	Pts: Myers 23; Rebs: Stephens 6 Asts: Myers 8 PIR: Myers 32	Report	Pts: Washington 23; Rebs: Osetkowski 8 Asts: C. Jones 3 PIR: Washington 25	Arena: Arena Gripe; Attendance: 2,000; Referees: Saša Pukl, Dragan Porobić, Edo Javor

20 October 2025 3	Partizan (Serbia)	109–103(OT)	(Serbia) FMP SoccerBet	Belgrade
20:00	Scoring by quarter: 21–23, 26–16, 21–30, 22–21, Overtime: 19–13
Arena Sport	Pts: Washington 31; Rebs: Bonga 8 Asts: C. Jones 6 PIR: Washington 36	Report	Pts: Barna 28; Rebs: Ojiako 7 Asts: Scott 8 PIR: Barna 35	Arena: Belgrade Arena; Attendance: 5,141; Referees: Igor Dragojević, Miloš Koljenšić, Nermin Nikšić

26 October 2025 4	Partizan (Serbia)	85–74	(Serbia) Borac Mozzart	Belgrade
21:00	Scoring by quarter: 28–20, 20–16, 20–15, 17–23
Arena Sport	Pts: Washington 15; Rebs: Muurinen 6 Asts: Parker 5 PIR: Osetkowski 22	Report	Pts: Nikolić 18; Rebs: Jošilo 8 Asts: Baldwin, Radović, Fundić 4 PIR: Nikolić 16	Arena: Belgrade Arena; Attendance: 4,039; Referees: Mario Majkić, Marko Mustapić, Ernad Karović

3 November 2025 5	Dubai Basketball (United Arab Emirates)	82–70	(Serbia) Partizan	Dubai
17:00	Scoring by quarter: 18–19, 23–24, 25–12, 16–15
Arena Sport	Pts: Petrušev 18; Rebs: Kamenjaš 9 Asts: Wright IV 4 PIR: Petrušev 25	Report	Pts: Parker 10; Rebs: Bonga 4 Asts: Calathes 8 PIR: Fernando 13	Arena: Coca-Cola Arena; Attendance: 2,621; Referees: Tomislav Hordov, Milan Nedović, Dragan Porobić

16 January 2026* 7	Igokea m:tel (Bosnia and Herzegovina)	81–103	(Serbia) Partizan	Laktaši
19:00	Scoring by quarter: 18–33, 28–21, 21–30, 14–19
Arena Sport	Pts: Gavrilović 16; Rebs: Simanić 6 Asts: Rorie 7 PIR: Gavrilović 20	Report	Pts: Washington 20; Rebs: Bonga 9 Asts: Washington 6 PIR: Bonga 28	Arena: Laktaši Sports Hall; Attendance: 2,550; Referees: Saša Pukl, Franko Gracin, Bojan Kruljac

23 November 2025 8	Partizan (Serbia)	94–72	(Montenegro) SC Derby	Belgrade
20:00	Scoring by quarter: 25–20, 21–21, 23–12, 25–19
Arena Sport	Pts: Parker 28; Rebs: Calathes 7 Asts: Milton 5 PIR: Parker 27	Report	Pts: Hadžibegović, Rebec 15; Rebs: Hadžibegović 7 Asts: Johnson, Rebec 4 PIR: Hadžibegović 14	Arena: Belgrade Arena; Attendance: 3,265; Referees: Milan Nedović, Miloš Koljenšić, Ivan Stefanović

7 December 2025 9	U-BT Cluj-Napoca (Romania)	85–92	(Serbia) Partizan	Cluj-Napoca
19:30	Scoring by quarter: 24–21, 14–24, 21–24, 26–23
Arena Sport	Pts: Guzmán 20; Rebs: Miletić 13; Asts: Russell 5 PIR: Miletić 37	Report	Pts: Bonga 21; Rebs: T. Jones 6 Asts: Calathes 11; PIR: Bonga 26	Arena: BTarena; Attendance: 10,000; Referees: Igor Dragojević, Marko Juras, Marko Mustapić

14 December 2025 10	FMP SoccerBet (Serbia)	79–91	(Serbia) Partizan	Belgrade
21:00	Scoring by quarter: 21–19, 23–20, 16–28, 19–24
Arena Sport	Pts: Barna 21; Rebs: Grojić 7 Asts: Barna 8 PIR: Barna 25	Report	Pts: Milton 26; Rebs: Bonga 8 Asts: Milton 5 PIR: Milton 34	Arena: Železnik Hall; Attendance: 1,287; Referees: Josip Radojković, Denis Hadžić, Mario Majkić

22 December 2025 11	Krka (Slovenia)	92–99	(Serbia) Partizan	Ljubljana (Note: The match was played at the Tivoli Hall, Ljubljana, instead of the Leon Štukelj Hall, Novo Mesto, as the arena was severely damaged by flooding.)
17:00	Scoring by quarter: 18–25, 34–19, 25–25, 15–30
Arena Sport	Pts: Smrekar 19; Rebs: Mathon, Urbiha 5 Asts: Ihring 6 PIR: Urbiha 23	Report	Pts: Washington 48; Rebs: Fernando, Bonga 6 Asts: Calathes 4 PIR: Washington 46	Arena: Tivoli Hall; Attendance: 1,300; Referees: Uroš Obrknežević, Dragan Porobić, Goran Stojančević

28 December 2025 12	Partizan (Serbia)	110–74	(Croatia) Split	Belgrade
19:30	Scoring by quarter: 24–16, 32–22, 27–20, 27–16
Arena Sport	Pts: Payne 24; Rebs: Fernando, Bonga 7 Asts: Washington, Calathes 6 PIR: Bonga 29	Report	Pts: Drežnjak 23; Rebs: Stephens 6 Asts: Drežnjak 5 PIR: Drežnjak 25	Arena: Aleksandar Nikolić Hall (Note: The match was played at the Aleksandar Nikolić Hall instead of the Belgrade Arena, as the arena was unavailable due to hosting the 2026 Men's European Water Polo Championship.); Attendance: 2,047; Referees: Ilija Belošević, Marko Mustapić, Ivan Milićević

3 January 2026 13	Borac Mozzart (Serbia)	91–106	(Serbia) Partizan	Čačak
20:30	Scoring by quarter: 24–30, 23–26, 25–23, 19–27
Arena Sport	Pts: Čarapić 19; Rebs: Manojlović 7 Asts: Baldwin 5 PIR: Čarapić 21	Report	Pts: Calathes 22; Rebs: Bonga 7 Asts: Calathes 9 PIR: Calathes 31	Arena: Borac Hall; Attendance: 2,000; Referees: Igor Dragojević, Josip Radojković, Andraž Rebeušek

11 January 2026 14	SC Derby (Montenegro)	66–78	(Serbia) Partizan	Podgorica
20:30	Scoring by quarter: 16–15, 12–27, 21–15, 17–21
Arena Sport	Pts: Drežnjak, Ilić 16; Rebs: Hadžibegović 6 Asts: Drežnjak 5 PIR: Ilić 25	Report	Pts: Washington 22; Rebs: Jekiri 6 Asts: Calathes, Jekiri 4 PIR: Jekiri 24	Arena: Morača Sports Center; Attendance: 1,500; Referees: Luka Kardum, Uroš Obrknežević, Radoš Savović

25 January 2026 16	Partizan (Serbia)	90–84	(Bosnia and Herzegovina) Igokea m:tel	Belgrade
18:00	Scoring by quarter: 19–18, 21–18, 22–21, 28–27
Arena Sport	Pts: Brown, Fernando 15; Rebs: Fernando 9 Asts: Calathes, Brown, Bonga 4 PIR: Fernando 24	Report	Pts: Gavrilović 17; Rebs: Bess 5 Asts: Rorie, Pierre-Louis 6 PIR: Pierre-Louis 22	Arena: Aleksandar Nikolić Hall; Attendance: 1,107; Referees: Tomislav Hordov, Uroš Obrknežević, Krunoslav Peić

31 January 2026 17	Partizan (Serbia)	90–79	(Romania) U-BT Cluj-Napoca	Belgrade
19:00	Scoring by quarter: 25–23, 27–15, 20–19, 18–22
Arena Sport	Pts: Osetkowski 20; Rebs: Bonga 8 Asts: Payne 6 PIR: Osetkowski, Jekiri 20	Report	Pts: Russell 19; Rebs: Miletić 7 Asts: Russell 6 PIR: Russell 21	Arena: Belgrade Arena; Attendance: 3,126; Referees: Ilija Belošević, Milivoje Jovčić, Uroš Obrknežević

9 February 2026 18	Partizan (Serbia)	86–76	(United Arab Emirates) Dubai Basketball	Belgrade
20:00	Scoring by quarter: 23–19, 21–20, 28–19, 14–18
Arena Sport	Pts: Washington 33; Rebs: Jekiri, Brown 4 Asts: Calathes 7 PIR: Washington 30	Report	Pts: Kebengele 20; Rebs: Bacon 7 Asts: Wright IV 5 PIR: Kebengele 24	Arena: Belgrade Arena; Attendance: 11,707; Referees: Damir Javor, Tomislav Hordov, Sašo Petek

=== Top 8 ===
Pos	Team	Pld	W	L	PF	PA	PD	Pts	Qualification or relegation
1	(United Arab Emirates Basketball Association) Dubai Basketball	24	21	3	2150	1849	+301	45	Qualification to Playoffs
2	(Basketball Federation of Serbia) Partizan Mozzart Bet	24	21	3	2186	1919	+267	45	Qualification to Playoffs
3	(Basketball Federation of Serbia) Crvena zvezda Meridianbet	24	18	6	2192	2019	+173	42	Qualification to Playoffs
4	(Basketball Federation of Montenegro) Budućnost VOLI	24	18	6	2153	1943	+210	42	Qualification to Playoffs
5	(Romanian Basketball Federation) U-BT Cluj-Napoca	24	13	11	2175	2145	+30	37	Qualification to Playoffs

Source: ABA League

==== Matches ====
Win Loss

15 February 2026 1	Partizan (Serbia)	98–82	(Montenegro) Budućnost VOLI	Belgrade
21:00	Scoring by quarter: 25–19, 23–21, 33–22, 17–20
Arena Sport	Pts: Washington, Brown 14; Rebs: Bonga 8 Asts: Calathes 7 PIR: Bonga 22	Report	Pts: Bouteille, Sulaimon 14; Rebs: Boutsiele 6 Asts: Ferrell 6 PIR: Ferrell 21	Arena: Belgrade Arena; Attendance: 5,302; Referees: Ilija Belošević, Miloš Koljenšić, Franko Gracin

8 March 2026 2	Bosna BH Telecom (Bosnia and Herzegovina)	56–96	(Serbia) Partizan	Sarajevo
20:00	Scoring by quarter: 15–24, 12–31, 9–26, 20–15
Arena Sport	Pts: Jõesaar, Caruthers 10; Rebs: Halilović 8 Asts: Atić, Caruthers 4 PIR: Halilović 14	Report	Pts: Brown 21; Rebs: Bonga 9 Asts: Milton 6 PIR: Milton 22	Arena: Zetra Olympic Hall; Attendance: 5,100; Referees: Milan Nedović, Mario Majkić, Aleksandar Davidov

15 March 2026 3	Partizan (Serbia)	86–70	(Slovenia) Cedevita Olimpija	Belgrade
13:00	Scoring by quarter: 20–22, 19–18, 25–18, 22–12
Arena Sport	Pts: Fernando 19; Rebs: Fernando 7 Asts: C. Jones, Calathes, Milton 4 PIR: Fernando 23	Report	Pts: Hurt 13; Rebs: Hurt, Blažič 5 Asts: Gibson 4 PIR: Blažič 11	Arena: Belgrade Arena; Attendance: 4,253; Referees: Tomislav Hordov, Mario Majkić, Marko Mustapić

22 March 2026 4	Crvena zvezda Meridianbet (Serbia)	100–96	(Serbia) Partizan	Belgrade
20:30	Scoring by quarter: 24–21, 20–25, 29–23, 27–27
Arena Sport	Pts: Bolomboy 16; Rebs: Bolomboy 10; Asts: Miller-McIntyre 10; PIR: Bolomboy 21	Report	Pts: Fernando, Milton 15; Rebs: Calathes 7 Asts: Calathes, C. Jones 7 PIR: C. Jones 24	Arena: Belgrade Arena; Attendance: 10,718; Referees: Saša Pukl, Sašo Petek, Marko Mustapić

30 March 2026 5	Partizan (Serbia)	82–66	(Bosnia and Herzegovina) Bosna BH Telecom	Belgrade
21:00	Scoring by quarter: 12–17, 29–18, 20–14, 21–17
Arena Sport	Pts: Milton 15; Rebs: Bonga 6 Asts: C. Jones 6 PIR: Milton 21	Report	Pts: Halilović 15; Rebs: Halilović, Jõesaar 6 Asts: Caruthers 6 PIR: Halilović 19	Arena: Belgrade Arena; Attendance: 2,469; Referees: Luka Kardum, Vladimir Jevtović, Edo Javor

5 April 2026 6	Budućnost VOLI (Montenegro)	95–89	(Serbia) Partizan	Podgorica
18:00	Scoring by quarter: 24–27, 28–18, 22–28, 21–16
Arena Sport	Pts: Bouteille 19; Rebs: Bouteille 7 Asts: Sulaimon 5 PIR: Bouteille 25	Report	Pts: Milton 21; Rebs: Milton 8 Asts: Calathes 5 PIR: Milton 29	Arena: Morača Sports Center; Attendance: 4,260; Referees: Ilija Belošević, Miloš Koljenšić, Nermin Nikšić

12 April 2026 7	Cedevita Olimpija (Slovenia)	79–85	(Serbia) Partizan	Ljubljana
17:00	Scoring by quarter: 19–15, 21–25, 17–20, 22–25
Arena Sport	Pts: Gibson 25; Rebs: Radović 11; Asts: Nikolić, Hurt 4 PIR: Gibson 22	Report	Pts: Milton 21; Rebs: Fernando 8 Asts: Calathes 5 PIR: Milton 22	Arena: Arena Stožice; Attendance: 6,123; Referees: Uroš Obrknežević, Sašo Petek, Josip Radojković

19 April 2026 8	Partizan (Serbia)	81–74	(Serbia) Crvena zvezda Meridianbet	Belgrade
19:30	Scoring by quarter: 24–18, 26–19, 14–21, 17–16
Arena Sport	Pts: Bonga 17; Rebs: Jekiri 8 Asts: Calathes 5 PIR: Bonga 28	Report	Pts: Moneke 19; Rebs: Izundu 7 Asts: Miller-McIntyre 5 PIR: Moneke 21	Arena: Belgrade Arena; Attendance: 15,547; Referees: Saša Pukl, Tomislav Hordov, Dragan Porobić

=== Playoffs ===
==== Quarterfinals ====
6 May 2026 G1	Partizan (Serbia)	81–73	(Bosnia and Herzegovina) Bosna BH Telecom	Belgrade
21:00	Scoring by quarter: 13–18, 27–14, 23–15, 18–26
Arena Sport	Pts: Washington 19; Rebs: Fernando 8 Asts: C. Jones 5 PIR: Calathes 19	Report	Pts: Kovačević 13; Rebs: Halilović 14; Asts: West 7 PIR: Halilović 24	Arena: Aleksandar Nikolić Hall (Note: The match was played at the Aleksandar Nikolić Hall instead of the Belgrade Arena, as the arena was unavailable due to hosting the Ovo by Cirque du Soleil.); Attendance: 1,768; Referees: Saša Pukl, Vladimir Jevtović, Nermin Nikšić

10 May 2026 G2	Bosna BH Telecom (Bosnia and Herzegovina)	73–87	(Serbia) Partizan	Sarajevo
17:00	Scoring by quarter: 17–26, 25–29, 18–13, 13–19
Arena Sport	Pts: West 18; Rebs: Manojlović 5 Asts: Caruthers 3 PIR: West 17	Report	Pts: Bonga 18; Rebs: Fernando 10; Asts: Brown 6 PIR: Jekiri 23	Arena: Zetra Olympic Hall; Attendance: 3,333; Referees: Damir Javor, Igor Dragojević, Krunoslav Peić

==== Semifinals ====
18 May 2026 G1	Partizan (Serbia)	100–94	(Serbia) Crvena zvezda Meridianbet	Belgrade
20:00	Scoring by quarter: 25–19, 27–27, 26–13, 22–35
Arena Sport	Pts: Washington 23; Rebs: Fernando 8 Asts: Calathes 8 PIR: Washington 21	Report	Pts: Nwora 31; Rebs: Izundu 6 Asts: Butler 4 PIR: Nwora 35	Arena: Belgrade Arena; Attendance: 14,127; Referees: Tomislav Hordov, Miloš Koljenšić, Josip Radojković

21 May 2026 G2	Crvena zvezda Meridianbet (Serbia)	78–89	(Serbia) Partizan	Belgrade
20:00	Scoring by quarter: 16–28, 17–21, 20–18, 25–22
Arena Sport	Pts: Nwora, Bolomboy 12; Rebs: Bolomboy, Izundu 6 Asts: Miller-McIntyre 8 PIR: Bolomboy 17	Report	Pts: Fernando 19; Rebs: Bonga 7 Asts: Jones 8 PIR: Osetkowski 25	Arena: Aleksandar Nikolić Hall; Attendance: 6,275; Referees: Saša Pukl, Sašo Petek, Igor Dragojević

==== Finals ====
4 June 2026 G1	Dubai Basketball (United Arab Emirates)	99–93	(Serbia) Partizan	Dubai
18:00	Scoring by quarter: 29–24, 24–20, 16–22, 30–27
Arena Sport	Pts: Musa 22; Rebs: Kabengele 8 Asts: Wright IV 9 PIR: Kabengele, Wright IV 26	Report	Pts: Jones 21; Rebs: Jones, Fernando, Pokuševski 5 Asts: Calathes 5 PIR: Jones 26	Arena: Coca-Cola Arena; Attendance: 9,421; Referees: Damir Javor, Milan Nedović, Franko Gracin

6 June 2026 G2	Dubai Basketball (United Arab Emirates)	86–81	(Serbia) Partizan	Dubai
18:00	Scoring by quarter: 20–24, 22–18, 26–24, 18–15
Arena Sport	Pts: Musa, Avramović 16; Rebs: Anderson, Kamenjaš 5 Asts: Musa, Wright IV, Bacon 4 PIR: Avramović 16	Report	Pts: Fernando 16; Rebs: Fernando 7 Asts: Jones 6 PIR: Fernando 25	Arena: Coca-Cola Arena; Attendance: 11,952; Referees: Tomislav Hordov, Miloš Koljenšić, Josip Radojković

10 June 2026 G3	Partizan (Serbia)	84–70	(United Arab Emirates) Dubai Basketball	Belgrade
19:00	Scoring by quarter: 23–10, 24–24, 20–21, 17–15
Arena Sport	Pts: Jones, Fernando 15; Rebs: Bonga 9 Asts: Jones 8 PIR: Fernando 27	Report	Pts: Kabengele, Bertāns 17; Rebs: Kabengele 9 Asts: Wright IV 5 PIR: Kabengele 29	Arena: Belgrade Arena; Attendance: 11,774; Referees: Saša Pukl, Igor Dragojević, Dragan Porobić

12 June 2026 G4	Partizan (Serbia)	81–83	(United Arab Emirates) Dubai Basketball	Belgrade
20:00	Scoring by quarter: 21–23, 18–17, 20–20, 22–23
Arena Sport	Pts: Bonga, Brown 16; Rebs: Bonga 8 Asts: Brown 6 PIR: Bonga 28	Report	Pts: Avramović 15; Rebs: Kabengele 8 Asts: Musa 6 PIR: Kabengele 21	Arena: Belgrade Arena; Attendance: 11,977; Referees: Tomislav Hordov, Miloš Koljenšić, Josip Radojković

== EuroLeague ==
=== Regular season ===
Pos	Team	Pld	W	L	PF	PA	PD
13	(German Basketball Federation) Bayern Munich	38	17	21	3063	3168	−105
14	(Italian Basketball Federation) EA7 Emporio Armani Milan	38	17	21	3246	3294	−48
15	(Basketball Federation of Serbia) Partizan Mozzart Bet	38	16	22	3052	3242	−190
16	(French Federation of Basketball) Paris Basketball	38	15	23	3422	3456	−34
17	(Italian Basketball Federation) Virtus Bologna	38	14	24	3110	3285	−175

Source: EuroLeague
Rules for classification: Regular season tiebreakers

==== Matches ====
Win Loss

30 September 2025 1	Dubai Basketball (United Arab Emirates)	89–76	(Serbia) Partizan	Dubai
18:00	Scoring by quarter: 28–18, 19–22, 21–16, 21–20
Arena Sport, EuroLeague TV	Pts: Bertāns 20; Rebs: Petrušev 8 Asts: Wright 7 PIR: Bertāns 26	Report	Pts: T. Jones 13; Rebs: Bonga 8 Asts: C. Jones 6 PIR: T. Jones 17	Arena: Coca-Cola Arena; Attendance: 6,063; Referees: Miguel Angel Perez, Piotr Pastusiak, Alberto Baena

2 October 2025 2	Partizan (Serbia)	80–78	(Italy) EA7 Emporio Armani Milan	Belgrade
20:30	Scoring by quarter: 21–19, 24–14, 24–29, 11–16
Arena Sport, EuroLeague TV	Pts: Brown 20; Rebs: Bonga 6 Asts: C. Jones 5 PIR: Brown 25	Report	Pts: Shields 21; Rebs: Nebo 6 Asts: Gudurić 8 PIR: Shields 26	Arena: Belgrade Arena; Attendance: 19,214; Referees: Mehdi Difallah, Carlos Cortés, Kristaps Konstantinovs

9 October 2025 3	Partizan (Serbia)	93–87	(Turkey) Anadolu Efes	Belgrade
20:30	Scoring by quarter: 31–24, 24–19, 16–26, 22–18
Arena Sport, EuroLeague TV	Pts: Brown 24; Rebs: T. Jones 8 Asts: C. Jones 4 PIR: T. Jones 28	Report	Pts: Cordinier 24; Rebs: Weiler-Babb 6 Asts: Weiler-Babb 5 PIR: Cordinier 30	Arena: Belgrade Arena; Attendance: 19,558; Referees: Emilio Pérez Pizarro, Saulius Racys, Amit Balak

15 October 2025 4	Real Madrid (Spain)	93–86	(Serbia) Partizan	Madrid
20:45	Scoring by quarter: 24–12, 28–21, 23–23, 18–30
Arena Sport, EuroLeague TV	Pts: Tavares 19; Rebs: Tavares 8 Asts: Campazzo 6 PIR: Tavares 27	Report	Pts: Parker 23; Rebs: Osetkowski 6 Asts: Brown 3 PIR: Osetkowski 20	Arena: Movistar Arena; Attendance: 8,467; Referees: Emin Moğulkoç, Borys Ryzhyk, Ioannis Foufis

17 October 2025 5	Baskonia Vitoria-Gasteiz (Spain)	79–91	(Serbia) Partizan	Vitoria-Gasteiz
20:45	Scoring by quarter: 20–22, 20–26, 24–18, 15–25
Arena Sport, EuroLeague TV	Pts: Diallo 20; Rebs: Sedekerskis 5 Asts: Nowell 7 PIR: Diallo 24	Report	Pts: C. Jones 18; Rebs: Parker 9 Asts: C. Jones 10; PIR: C. Jones 23	Arena: Buesa Arena; Attendance: 8,724; Referees: Saša Pukl, Gytis Vilius, Vasiliki Tsaroucha

24 October 2025 6	Partizan (Serbia)	83–101	(France) Paris Basketball	Belgrade
20:30	Scoring by quarter: 26–26, 20–22, 14–23, 23–30
Arena Sport, EuroLeague TV	Pts: Brown 25; Rebs: Bonga 9 Asts: Washington 5 PIR: Brown 27	Report	Pts: Hifi 21; Rebs: Faye 7 Asts: Hifi, Dokossi, Robinson 4 PIR: Hifi 29	Arena: Belgrade Arena; Attendance: 20,024; Referees: Miguel Angel Perez, Arturas Sukys, Tomasz Trawicki

29 October 2025 7	Hapoel IBI Tel Aviv (Israel)	97–84	(Serbia) Partizan	Sofia (Note: During the first 14 rounds of the 2025–26 EuroLeague season, Hapoel IBI Tel Aviv played their home matches in Bulgaria (Sofia and Botevgrad) due to the inability to host matches in Israel as a result of the Gaza war.)
19:00	Scoring by quarter: 25–19, 18–23, 27–21, 27–21
Arena Sport, EuroLeague TV	Pts: Malcolm 17; Rebs: Bryant 9 Asts: Malcolm, Micić 4 PIR: Malcolm 27	Report	Pts: Brown 19; Rebs: T. Jones 10; Asts: Washington 6 PIR: T. Jones 20	Arena: Arena Sofia; Attendance: 7,647; Referees: Juan Carlos Garcia, Jakub Zamojski, Sergio Manuel

31 October 2025 8	Partizan (Serbia)	76–78	(Spain) FC Barcelona	Belgrade
20:30	Scoring by quarter: 17–18, 24–15, 15–25, 20–20
Arena Sport, EuroLeague TV	Pts: Washington 21; Rebs: T. Jones 13; Asts: T. Jones 7 PIR: T. Jones 29	Report	Pts: Shengelia 24; Rebs: Shengelia, Satoranský 5 Asts: Shengelia 5 PIR: Shengelia 42	Arena: Belgrade Arena; Attendance: 20,003; Referees: Emin Moğulkoç, Seffi Shemmesh, Adar Peer

7 November 2025 9	Olympiacos Piraeus (Greece)	80–71	(Serbia) Partizan	Piraeus
20:15	Scoring by quarter: 20–20, 18–19, 15–19, 27–13
Arena Sport, EuroLeague TV	Pts: Walkup 15; Rebs: Milutinov 10; Asts: Walkup 4 PIR: Milutinov 21	Report	Pts: Washington 20; Rebs: T. Jones, Bonga 7 Asts: Milton 5 PIR: T. Jones 25	Arena: Peace and Friendship Stadium; Attendance: 12,750; Referees: Robert Lottermoser, Jordi Aliaga, Piotr Pastusiak

11 November 2025 10	Partizan (Serbia)	78–76	(France) AS Monaco	Belgrade
20:30	Scoring by quarter: 19–20, 17–12, 28–17, 14–27
Arena Sport, EuroLeague TV	Pts: Washington 22; Rebs: T. Jones 8 Asts: Milton, Brown 4 PIR: Pokuševski 15	Report	Pts: Mirotić 17; Rebs: Mirotić 8 Asts: James 5 PIR: Mirotić 17	Arena: Belgrade Arena; Attendance: 19,747; Referees: Carlos Peruga, Carlos Cortes, Robert Vyklicky

14 November 2025 11	LDLC ASVEL (France)	88–87	(Serbia) Partizan	Lyon
20:15	Scoring by quarter: 26–20, 16–16, 24–27, 22–24
Arena Sport, EuroLeague TV	Pts: Seljaas, Watson Jr. 18; Rebs: Massa 5 Asts: Watson Jr. 6 PIR: Seljaas 23	Report	Pts: Brown 20; Rebs: Pokuševski 7 Asts: Brown, Calathes 4 PIR: Brown 22	Arena: Astroballe; Attendance: 5,560; Referees: Miguel Angel Perez, Guido Giovannetti, Noam Gordon

21 November 2025 12	Partizan (Serbia)	87–99	(Turkey) Fenerbahçe Beko	Belgrade
20:30	Scoring by quarter: 11–24, 28–32, 29–19, 19–24
Arena Sport, EuroLeague TV	Pts: Brown 27; Rebs: Bonga 8 Asts: Milton 4 PIR: Brown 26	Report	Pts: Jantunen 19; Rebs: Melli 6 Asts: Baldwin IV 8 PIR: Baldwin IV 21	Arena: Belgrade Arena; Attendance: 19,561; Referees: Mehdi Difallah, Emilio Perez, Amit Balak

25 November 2025 13	Panathinaikos AKTOR (Greece)	91–69	(Serbia) Partizan	Athens
20:15	Scoring by quarter: 27–31, 21–13, 25–6, 18–19
Arena Sport, EuroLeague TV	Pts: Nunn 26; Rebs: Hernangomez 15; Asts: Sloukas 10; PIR: Nunn 39	Report	Pts: Brown 16; Rebs: Bonga 4 Asts: Milton 5 PIR: Washington 12	Arena: Telekom Center Athens; Attendance: 18,933; Referees: Robert Lottermoser, Oļegs Latiševs, Alberto Baena

4 December 2025 14	Partizan (Serbia)	92–85	(Germany) FC Bayern Munich	Belgrade
20:45	Scoring by quarter: 16–22, 20–21, 28–15, 28–27
Arena Sport, EuroLeague TV	Pts: Washington 22; Rebs: T. Jones 10; Asts: Washington 6 PIR: Washington 31	Report	Pts: Dinwiddie 25; Rebs: Voigtmann 18; Asts: Voigtmann 7 PIR: Voigtmann 29	Arena: Belgrade Arena; Attendance: 17,249; Referees: Miguel Angel Perez, Arturas Sukys, Thomas Bissuel

12 December 2025 15	Partizan (Serbia)	79–76	(Serbia) Crvena zvezda Meridianbet	Belgrade
20:30	Scoring by quarter: 15–18, 20–21, 14–21, 30–16
Arena Sport, EuroLeague TV	Pts: Washington 25; Rebs: Bonga 11; Asts: Milton, Calathes 3 PIR: T. Jones 30	Report	Pts: Nwora, Butler 20; Rebs: Nwora 7 Asts: Miller-McIntyre 6 PIR: Nwora 20	Arena: Belgrade Arena; Attendance: 21,854; Referees: Carlos Peruga, Emilio Perez, Kristaps Konstantinovs

17 December 2025 16	Partizan (Serbia)	68–86	(Italy) Virtus Bologna	Belgrade
20:30	Scoring by quarter: 19-24, 18-16, 15-21, 16-25
Arena Sport, EuroLeague TV	Pts: Brown 15; Rebs: Fernando 7 Asts: Calathes 5 PIR: Bonga 16	Report	Pts: Edwards 20; Rebs: Jallow 6 Asts: Morgan 5 PIR: Alston Jr. 21	Arena: Belgrade Arena; Attendance: 16,435; Referees: Juan Carlos Garcia, Borys Ryzhyk, Eduard Udyanskyy

19 December 2025 17	Žalgiris Kaunas (Lithuania)	109–68	(Serbia) Partizan	Kaunas
19:00	Scoring by quarter: 28–15, 25–15, 29–18, 27–20
Arena Sport, EuroLeague TV	Pts: Francisco 22; Rebs: Ulanovas 8 Asts: Lô 6 PIR: Wright 27	Report	Pts: Washington 17; Rebs: Bonga, Fernando 4 Asts: Calathes 8 PIR: Fernando 20	Arena: Žalgiris Arena; Attendance: 14,627; Referees: Mehdi Difallah, Rain Peerandi, Vasiliki Tsaroucha

26 December 2025 18	Partizan (Serbia)	87–112	(Israel) Maccabi Rapyd Tel Aviv	Belgrade
20:30	Scoring by quarter: 31-30, 12-28, 16-34, 28-20
Arena Sport, EuroLeague TV	Pts: Payne 15; Rebs: T. Jones 6 Asts: Payne 6 PIR: Payne 21	Report	Pts: Walker IV 20; Rebs: Leaf , Sorkin 6 Asts: Blatt 7 PIR: Sorkin 26	Arena: Belgrade Arena; Attendance: 13,749; Referees: Miguel Angel Perez, Arturas Sukys, Michele Rossi

30 December 2025 19	Valencia Basket (Spain)	86–73	(Serbia) Partizan	Valencia
20:30	Scoring by quarter: 18-22, 25-21, 22-20, 21-10
Arena Sport, EuroLeague TV	Pts: Thompson 17; Rebs: Reuvers, Pradilla, Sako 7 Asts: Thompson 6 PIR: Thompson 22	Report	Pts: Bonga 17; Rebs: Bonga 7 Asts: Calathes 6 PIR: Bonga 23	Arena: Roig Arena; Attendance: 12,731; Referees: Emin Moğulkoç, Jakub Zamojski, Gytis Vilius

6 January 2026 20	AS Monaco (France)	101–84	(Serbia) Partizan	Monaco
19:30	Scoring by quarter: 28–21, 26–18, 20–24, 27–21
Arena Sport, EuroLeague TV	Pts: Diallo 14; Rebs: Diallo, Theis 5 Asts: Mike James 8 PIR: Mirotić 18	Report	Pts: Brown 19; Rebs: Bonga 5 Asts: Payne 5 PIR: Brown 17	Arena: Salle Gaston Médecin; Attendance: 3,898; Referees: Juan Carlos Garcia, Oļegs Latiševs, Steve Bittner

9 January 2026 21	FC Barcelona (Spain)	88–70	(Serbia) Partizan	Barcelona
20:30	Scoring by quarter: 13–20, 28–15, 21–15, 26–20
Arena Sport, EuroLeague TV	Pts: Hernangómez 16; Rebs: Hernangómez 8 Asts: Laprovíttola 8 PIR: W.Hernangómez 22	Report	Pts: Washington 20; Rebs: Jekiri, Fernando, Bonga 7 Asts: Washington 5 PIR: Washington 19	Arena: Palau Blaugrana; Attendance: 5,574; Referees: Mehdi Difallah, Borys Ryzhyk, Hugues Thepenier

14 January 2026 22	Partizan (Serbia)	66–104	(Greece) Olympiacos Piraues	Belgrade
20:30	Scoring by quarter: 17–20, 13–32, 13–27, 23–25
Arena Sport, EuroLeague TV	Pts: Washington 28; Rebs: Jekiri 10; Asts: Washington, Payne, Calathes 3 PIR: Washington 23	Report	Pts: Vezenkov 25; Rebs: Hall, Vezenkov, Milutinov 7 Asts: Walkup 7 PIR: Vezenkov 32	Arena: Aleksandar Nikolić Hall; Attendance: 4,503; Referees: Emin Moğulkoç, Arturas Sukys, Saulius Racys

20 January 2026 23	FC Bayern Munich (Germany)	63–67	(Serbia) Partizan	Munich
20:30	Scoring by quarter: 7–18, 25–16, 18–16, 13–17
Arena Sport, EuroLeague TV	Pts: Gabriel 13; Rebs: Gabriel, Lučić 4 Asts: Hollatz 5 PIR: Gabriel 19	Report	Pts: Payne 16; Rebs: Jekiri 8 Asts: Payne, Calathes 4 PIR: Payne 18	Arena: SAP Garden; Attendance: 10,469; Referees: Carlos Cortes, Gytis Vilius, Alberto Baena

23 January 2026 24	Partizan (Serbia)	104–101(OT)	(Israel) Hapoel IBI Tel Aviv	Munich (Note: Partizan hosted the match against Hapoel IBI Tel Aviv in Munich, at BMW Park, as the Belgrade Arena was unavailable.)
20:30	Scoring by quarter: 17–27, 18–29, 28–17, 25–15, Overtime: 16–13
Arena Sport, EuroLeague TV	Pts: Payne 19; Rebs: Bonga 9 Asts: Calathes 8 PIR: Fernando 25	Report	Pts: Oturu 24; Rebs: Wainright 5 Asts: Micić 9 PIR: Oturu 23	Arena: BMW Park; Attendance: 1,093; Referees: Carlos Peruga, Rain Peerandi, Kristaps Konstantinovs

29 January 2026 25	EA7 Emporio Armani Milan (Italy)	85–79	(Serbia) Partizan	Milan
20:30	Scoring by quarter: 25–22, 27–21, 17–14, 16–22
Arena Sport, EuroLeague TV	Pts: LeDay 20; Rebs: Ellis 5 Asts: Gudurić 6 PIR: Nebo, LeDay 19	Report	Pts: Brown 17; Rebs: Jekiri 6 Asts: Calathes 7 PIR: Brown, Osetkowski 18	Arena: Allianz Cloud Arena; Attendance: 3,760; Referees: Robert Lottermoser, Saulius Racys, Marcin Kowalski

3 February 2026 26	Maccabi Rapyd Tel Aviv (Israel)	95–93	(Serbia) Partizan	Tel Aviv
20:05	Scoring by quarter: 27–22, 21–28, 24–27, 23–16
Arena Sport, EuroLeague TV	Pts: Lundberg, Clark III 21; Rebs: Hoard 5 Asts: Lundberg 5 PIR: Lundberg 27	Report	Pts: Brown 19; Rebs: Fernando 7 Asts: Payne 6 PIR: Fernando 29	Arena: Menora Mivtachim Arena; Attendance: 9,072; Referees: Miguel Angel Perez, Ioannis Foufis, Robert Vyklicky

5 February 2026 27	Partizan (Serbia)	78–62	(Greece) Panathinaikos AKTOR	Belgrade
20:30	Scoring by quarter: 20–19, 25–14, 21–9, 12–20
Arena Sport, EuroLeague TV	Pts: Payne 18; Rebs: Bonga 6 Asts: Payne, Brown 5 PIR: Brown, Bonga 22	Report	Pts: Shorts 21; Rebs: Hernangómez 8 Asts: Sloukas 3 PIR: Shorts 24	Arena: Belgrade Arena; Attendance: 13,716; Referees: Emilio Perez, Arturas Sukys, Maxime Boubert

13 February 2026 28	Partizan (Serbia)	73–77	(Spain) Real Madrid	Belgrade
20:30	Scoring by quarter: 19–20, 14–23, 28–19, 12–15
Arena Sport, EuroLeague TV	Pts: Brown 14; Rebs: Bonga, Fernando 8 Asts: Brown, Calathes 4 PIR: Fernando 22	Report	Pts: Lyles, Hezonja 14; Rebs: Tavares 7 Asts: Campazzo, Hezonja 4 PIR: Lyles 20	Arena: Belgrade Arena; Attendance: 18,254; Referees: Emin Moğulkoç, Rain Peerandi, Thomas Bissuel

25 February 2026 29	Fenerbahçe Beko (Turkey)	81–78	(Serbia) Partizan	Istanbul
18:45	Scoring by quarter: 20–20, 15–19, 22–17, 24–22
Arena Sport, EuroLeague TV	Pts: Horton-Tucker 29; Rebs: Colson 8 Asts: Horton-Tucker, Baldwin IV 3 PIR: Horton-Tucker 33	Report	Pts: Fernando 18; Rebs: Fernando 9 Asts: Calathes 7 PIR: C. Jones 22	Arena: Ülker Sports and Event Hall; Attendance: 11,883; Referees: Emilio Perez, Ioannis Foufis, Manuel Attard

17 March 2026* 30	Partizan (Serbia)	88–74	(United Arab Emirates) Dubai Basketball	Belgrade
20:00	Scoring by quarter: 18–26, 20–21, 25–10, 25–17
Arena Sport, EuroLeague TV	Pts: C. Jones 23; Rebs: Fernando 7 Asts: C. Jones 5 PIR: C. Jones 31	Report	Pts: Kabengele 14; Rebs: Petrušev 6 Asts: Wright IV 5 PIR: Kabengele 20	Arena: Belgrade Arena; Attendance: 10,109; Referees: Mehdi Difallah, Arturas Sukys, Maxime Boubert

11 March 2026 31	Virtus Bologna (Italy)	82–88	(Serbia) Partizan	Bologna
20:45	Scoring by quarter: 25–29, 23–23, 15–13, 19–23
Arena Sport, EuroLeague TV	Pts: Edwards 19; Rebs: Ferrari, Niang 7 Asts: Edwards, Morgan 3 PIR: Diouf 20	Report	Pts: C. Jones 19; Rebs: Bonga 11; Asts: Bonga 5 PIR: Bonga 34	Arena: Virtus Arena; Attendance: 6,468; Referees: Borys Ryzhyk, Gytis Vilius, Thomas Bissuel

19 March 2026 32	Paris Basketball (France)	81–90	(Serbia) Partizan	Paris
20:45	Scoring by quarter: 20–17, 23–29, 14–20, 24–24
Arena Sport, EuroLeague TV	Pts: Hifi 23; Rebs: Dokossi 9 Asts: Robinson 5 PIR: Hifi 19	Report	Pts: Brown 17; Rebs: Brown 8 Asts: Calathes 10; PIR: Jekiri 22	Arena: Adidas Arena; Attendance: 7,052; Referees: Juan Carlos Garcia, Saulius Racys, Piotr Pastusiak

24 March 2026 33	Partizan (Serbia)	79–78	(France) LDLC ASVEL	Belgrade
20:45	Scoring by quarter: 14–24, 22–8, 23–25, 20–21
Arena Sport, EuroLeague TV	Pts: Osetkowski 16; Rebs: C. Jones, Osetkowski 5 Asts: Four players 4 PIR: Osetkowski 22	Report	Pts: Heurtel 19; Rebs: Vautier 6 Asts: Heurtel 9 PIR: Heurtel 18	Arena: Belgrade Arena; Attendance: 10,124; Referees: Robert Lottermoser, Carlos Cortes, Eduard Udyanskyy

27 March 2026 34	Partizan (Serbia)	110–104(OT)	(Spain) Valencia Basket	Belgrade
20:30	Scoring by quarter: 17–27, 24–14, 18–25, 25–18, Overtime: 26–20
Arena Sport, EuroLeague TV	Pts: Brown 31; Rebs: Brown 7 Asts: C. Jones, Calathes 6 PIR: Brown 32	Report	Pts: Taylor 18; Rebs: Key 8 Asts: Thompson 8 PIR: Taylor 25	Arena: Belgrade Arena; Attendance: 13,125; Referees: Borys Ryzhyk, Arturas Sukys, Thomas Bissuel

2 April 2026 35	Crvena zvezda Meridianbet (Serbia)	82–89	(Serbia) Partizan	Belgrade
20:00	Scoring by quarter: 20–21, 18–17, 17–20, 27–31
Arena Sport, EuroLeague TV	Pts: Miller-McIntyre 24; Rebs: Bolomboy 5 Asts: Miller-McIntyre 9 PIR: Miller-McIntyre 30	Report	Pts: C. Jones 26; Rebs: Brown 7 Asts: Calathes 8 PIR: C. Jones 27	Arena: Belgrade Arena; Attendance: 20,120; Referees: Carlos Peruga, Mehdi Difallah, Gytis Vilius

8 April 2026 36	Anadolu Efes (Turkey)	79–72(OT)	(Serbia) Partizan	Istanbul
19:30	Scoring by quarter: 15–13, 9–23, 19–14, 22–15, Overtime: 14–7
Arena Sport, EuroLeague TV	Pts: Loyd 24; Rebs: Poirier, Osmani 8 Asts: Weiler-Babb 12; PIR: Poirier 26	Report	Pts: Milton 12; Rebs: Bonga 7 Asts: Calathes 5 PIR: Bonga 15	Arena: Basketball Development Center; Attendance: 4,406; Referees: Miguel Angel Perez, Jordi Aliaga, Christian Theis

10 April 2026 37	Partizan (Serbia)	74–83	(Lithuania) Žalgiris Kaunas	Belgrade
20:30	Scoring by quarter: 22–26, 19–22, 16–15, 17–20
Arena Sport, EuroLeague TV	Pts: C. Jones 15; Rebs: Osetkowski, Fernando 9 Asts: C. Jones 4 PIR: Bonga, Fernando 17	Report	Pts: Francisco 18; Rebs: Wright 11; Asts: Francisco 6 PIR: Francisco 26	Arena: Belgrade Arena; Attendance: 20,006; Referees: Juan Carlos Garcia, Seffi Shemmesh, Sergio Manuel

16 April 2026 38	Partizan (Serbia)	91–79	(Spain) Baskonia Vitoria-Gasteiz	Belgrade
20:30	Scoring by quarter: 26–20, 18–19, 22–20, 25–20
Arena Sport, EuroLeague TV	Pts: Jekiri 16; Rebs: C. Jones 7 Asts: C. Jones 6 PIR: Jekiri 21	Report	Pts: Diakite 20; Rebs: Luwawu-Cabarrot 7 Asts: Simmons 5 PIR: Diakite 28	Arena: Belgrade Arena; Attendance: 11,992; Referees: Robert Lottermoser, Arturas Sukys, Amit Balak

== Serbian SuperLeague ==
=== Depth chart ===
Pos.	Starting 5	Bench 1	Bench 2	Inactive
C	Bruno Fernando	Joffrey Lauvergne
PF	Aleksej Pokuševski	Mario Nakić	Nikola Đurović
SF	Arijan Lakić	Mitar Bošnjaković	Đorđe Šekularac
SG	Aleksa Radanov	Uroš Danilović	Uroš Mijailović	Shake Milton (injured)
PG	Carlik Jones	Nick Calathes

(colors: Domestic players; foreign players; young players)

=== Playoffs ===
==== Play-in ====
30 April 2026 G1	Partizan	103–77	Sloboda Užice	Belgrade
18:30	Scoring by quarter: 23–25, 35–18, 23–18, 22–16
Arena Sport	Pts: Lakić 20; Rebs: Milton 10; Asts: Milton 8 PIR: Lakić 23	Boxscore	Pts: Šuškavčević 20; Rebs: Aksentijević 7 Asts: Bogićević, Simić 6 PIR: Simić, Božić 16	Arena: Belgrade Arena; Attendance: 2,869; Referees: Stefan Ćalić, Petar Pešić, Aleksandar Milojević

2 May 2026 G2	Sloboda Užice	55–63	Partizan	Užice
18:00	Scoring by quarter: 17–20, 11–13, 12–17, 15–13
Arena Sport	Pts: Šuškavčević 15; Rebs: Božić 12; Asts: Božić 5 PIR: Šuškavčević 16	Boxscore	Pts: Milton 14; Rebs: Fernando 9 Asts: Jones 5 PIR: Jones 21	Arena: Veliki Park Hall; Attendance: 2,600; Referees: Ilija Belošević, Vladimir Jevtović, Žarko Stanković

==== Final Four ====
29 May 2026 Semifinal	Partizan	79–92	FMP	Niš
16:00	Scoring by quarter: 18–25, 18–22, 17–22, 26–23
Arena Sport	Pts: Jones 17; Rebs: Lauvergne 6 Asts: Jones 10; PIR: Jones 23	Boxscore	Pts: Barna 26; Rebs: Gašić 10; Asts: Radosavljević 5 PIR: Barna 31	Arena: Čair Sports Center; Attendance: 2,000; Referees: Uroš Obrknežević, Vladimir Jevtović, Petar Pešić

== Radivoj Korać Cup ==
=== Depth chart ===
Pos.	Starting 5	Bench 1	Bench 2
C	Bruno Fernando	Aleksej Pokuševski
PF	Isaac Bonga		Nikola Đurović
SF	Sterling Brown	Mitar Bošnjaković	Uroš Danilović
SG	Arijan Lakić	Uroš Mijailović	Đorđe Šekularac
PG	Duane Washington	Aleksa Radanov

(colors: Domestic players; foreign players; young players)

=== Matches ===
Win Loss

19 February 2026 Quarterfinal	Partizan	95–90(OT)	FMP	Niš
20:00	Scoring by quarter: 21–21, 22–18, 16–27, 22–15, Overtime: 14–9
Arena Sport	Pts: Washington 26; Rebs: Fernando 9 Asts: Fernando, Pokuševski 4 PIR: Bonga 29	Boxscore	Pts: Stefanović, Barna 24; Rebs: Gašić 9 Asts: Barna 6 PIR: Stefanović, Barna 25	Arena: Čair Sports Center; Attendance: 5,200; Referees: Ilija Belošević, Milivoje Jovčić, Stefan Ćalić

20 February 2026 Semifinal	Partizan	58–80	Mega Superbet	Niš
20:30	Scoring by quarter: 19–25, 17–17, 11–17, 11–21
Arena Sport	Pts: Fernando, Washington 12; Rebs: Pokuševski 5 Asts: Washington, Pokuševski, Lakić 4 PIR: Fernando 14	Boxscore	Pts: Marković 17; Rebs: Marković 12; Asts: Drezgić, Mušicki 7 PIR: Marković 32	Arena: Čair Sports Center; Attendance: 4,500; Referees: Milivoje Jovčić, Stefan Ćalić, Vladimir Jevtović

== Individual awards ==
ABA League

Top Scorer

- (Germany) Duane Washington

Best Defender

- (Germany) Isaac Bonga

Ideal Starting Five

- (Germany) Isaac Bonga

MVP of the Month

- (Germany) Duane Washington – December

MVP of the Round

- (Germany) Duane Washington – Round 11
- (Germany) Isaac Bonga – Round 12
- (Germany) Isaac Bonga – Top 8 Round 8
- (Germany) Dylan Osetkowski – Semifinals G2
- (Angola) Bruno Fernando – Final G3

EuroLeague

MVP of the Month

- (South Sudan) Carlik Jones – March

MVP of the Round

- (United States) Sterling Brown – Round 34
