= 2023–24 KK Partizan season =

Serbian basketball club season

Partizan Mozzart Bet
2023–24 season
- President: (Serbia) Ostoja Mijailović
- Head coach: (Serbia) Željko Obradović
- Arena: Štark Arena
- ABA League: 2nd
- Serbian League: 2nd
- EuroLeague: 11th
- Serbian Cup: Runner-up
- ABA League Supercup: Runner-up
- Highest home attendance: 23,021 vs (Serbia) Mega MIS (22 January 2024)
- Average home attendance: 10,824 (in Adriatic League); 19,916 (in EuroLeague); 5,659 (in SerbianLeague)
- Biggest win: 98–52 vs (Bosnia and Herzegovina) Igokea (11 February 2024)
- Biggest defeat: 76–94 vs (Spain) Barcelona Bàsquet (14 March 2024)
Home	Away
- All statistics correct as of 6 April 2024.

In the 2023–24 season, Partizan competed in the Serbian League, Radivoj Korać Cup, Adriatic League, ABA League Supercup and EuroLeague.

== Players ==
=== Current roster ===
Note: Flags indicate national team eligibility at FIBA-sanctioned events. Players may hold other non-FIBA nationalities not displayed.

Partizan Mozzart Bet roster
Players
Coaches

Pos.	No.	Nat.	Name	Ht.		Age
G	0	(Croatia)	Smith, Jaleen	1.93 m (6 ft 4 in)	93 kg (205 lb)	31 – 24 November 1994
PF	2	(Azerbaijan)	LeDay, Zach	2.02 m (6 ft 8 in)	107 kg (236 lb)	32 – 30 May 1994
G	3	(Serbia)	Drezgić, Savo	1.94 m (6 ft 4 in)	90 kg (198 lb)	20 – 11 August 2006
G	4	(Serbia)	Avramović, Aleksa	1.92 m (6 ft 4 in)	87 kg (192 lb)	31 – 25 October 1994
C	5	(Serbia)	Koprivica, Balša	2.16 m (7 ft 1 in)	109 kg (240 lb)	26 – 1 May 2000
SG	7	(United States)	Punter, Kevin	1.93 m (6 ft 4 in)	81 kg (179 lb)	33 – 25 June 1993
F/C	9	(Serbia)	Smailagić, Alen	2.08 m (6 ft 10 in)	100 kg (220 lb)	26 – 18 August 2000
G	10	(Serbia)	Jaramaz, Ognjen	1.93 m (6 ft 4 in)	88 kg (194 lb)	31 – 1 September 1995
SF	21	(United States)	Nunnally, James	2.01 m (6 ft 7 in)	95 kg (209 lb)	36 – 14 July 1990
SF	32	(Serbia)	Trifunović, Uroš	2.01 m (6 ft 7 in)	89 kg (196 lb)	25 – 5 December 2000
SG	33	(Serbia)	Anđušić, Danilo	1.95 m (6 ft 5 in)	92 kg (203 lb)	35 – 22 April 1991
PG	35	(United States)	Dozier, PJ	1.98 m (6 ft 6 in)	93 kg (205 lb)	29 – 25 October 1996
SF	37	(Poland)	Ponitka, Mateusz	1.93 m (6 ft 4 in)	90 kg (198 lb)	34 – 21 September 1992
C	44	(United States)	Kaminsky, Frank	2.13 m (7 ft 0 in)	109 kg (240 lb)	33 – 4 April 1993
F/C	50	(Brazil)	Caboclo, Bruno	2.06 m (6 ft 9 in)	102 kg (225 lb)	31 – 21 September 1995

Head coach

- (Serbia) Željko Obradović

Assistant coach(es)

- (Spain) Josep Maria Izquierdo
- (Serbia) Vladimir Androić
- (Serbia) Aleksandar Matović
- (Serbia) Bogdan Karaičić

Strength & conditioning coach(es)

- (Serbia) Predrag Zimonjić

Team manager

- (Serbia) Zoran Savić

Legend

- (C) Team captain
- (R) Reserves
- Injured

- Roster
- Transactions
Updated: June 1, 2024

=== Players with multiple nationalities ===
- (United States) (Serbia) Kevin Punter
- (United States) (Croatia) Jaleen Smith
- (United States) (Azerbaijan) Zach LeDay

=== Depth chart ===
Pos.	Starting 5	Bench 1	Bench 2	Reserves
C	Frank Kaminsky	Bruno Caboclo	Balša Koprivica
PF	Zach LeDay	Alen Smailagić		Aleksa Dimitrijević
SF	James Nunnally	Mateusz Ponitka	Uroš Trifunović
SG	Kevin Punter	Jaleen Smith	Danilo Anđušić
PG	PJ Dozier	Aleksa Avramović	Ognjen Jaramaz	Savo Drezgić

=== Roster changes ===
==== In ====
No.	Pos.	Nat.	Name	Moving from		Type	Date	Source
10	G	(Serbia)	Ognjen Jaramaz	Bayern Munich	(Germany)	Contract termination	13 July 2023	
37	SF	(Poland)	Mateusz Ponitka	Panathinaikos	(Greece)	End of contract	13 July 2023	
35	G/F	(United States)	PJ Dozier	Sacramento Kings	(United States)	End of contract	12 August 2023	
44	F/C	(United States)	Frank Kaminsky	Houston Rockets	(United States)	End of contract	17 August 2023	
50	F/C	(Brazil)	Bruno Caboclo	Reyer Venezia	(Italy)	Contract termination	7 November 2023	
0	G	(Croatia)	Jaleen Smith	Virtus Bologna	(Italy)	Contract termination	24 December 2023	

==== Out ====
No.	Pos.	Nat.	Name	Moving to		Type	Date	Source
26	C	(France)	Mathias Lessort	Panathinaikos	(Greece)	End of contract	27 Jun 2023	
41	PG	(Israel)	Yam Madar	Fenerbahçe	(Turkey)	Contract termination	12 July 2023	
10	F	(Greece)	Ioannis Papapetrou	Panathinaikos	(Greece)	End of contract	12 July 2023	
11	PG	(Australia)	Dante Exum	Dallas Mavericks	(United States)	End of contract	14 July 2023	
13	SG	(Montenegro)	Đorđije Jovanović	Ontario Clippers	(United States)	Loan	5 November 2023	
3	SG	(Serbia)	Savo Drezgić	DME Academy	(United States)	Loan	28 December 2023	
1	PF/C	(Serbia)	Tristan Vukčević	Washington Wizards	(United States)	Transfer	13 March 2024	

== Competitions ==
=== Overall ===
Competition	Started round	Final position / round	First match	Last match
Adriatic League	Matchday 1	2nd	2 October 2023	19 May 2024
Adriatic League Supercup	Quarterfinals	Runner-up	18 September 2023	20 September 2023
Basketball League of Serbia	Semifinals	2nd	24 May 2024	5 June 2024
EuroLeague	Matchday 1	Regular season/11th	5 October 2023	12 April 2024
Radivoj Korać Cup	Quarterfinals	Runner-up	15 February 2024	17 February 2024

Updated to match played 19 May 2024
Source: Competitions

=== Overview ===
Competition	Record							
Competition	Pld	W	D	L	PF	PA	PD	Win %
Adriatic League	34	24	0	10	3,100	2,605	+495	70.59
Adriatic League Supercup	3	2	0	1	261	245	+16	66.67
Basketball League of Serbia	5	2	0	3	354	341	+13	40.00
EuroLeague	34	16	0	18	2,837	2,822	+15	47.06
Radivoj Korać Cup	3	2	0	1	251	219	+32	66.67
Total	79	46	0	33	6,803	6,232	+571	58.23

Last updated: 6 June 2024
Source: Competitions

== Pre-season and friendlies ==
Win Loss

8 September 2023	Partizan (Serbia)	86–81	(Israel) Hapoel Jerusalem	Laktaši
20:00	Scoring by quarter: 30–20, 13–27, 22–19, 21–15
Arena Sport	Pts: Jaramaz 12; Rebs: not available Asts: not available	Boxscore	Pts: Carrington 13; Rebs: not available Asts: not available	Arena: Laktaši Sports Hall

9 September 2023	Türk Telekom (Turkey)	71–75	(Serbia) Partizan	Banja Luka
18:30	Scoring by quarter: 15–25, 13–19, 21–18, 22–13
Arena Sport	Pts: Enoch 14; Rebs: not available Asts: not available	Boxscore	Pts: Anđušić 15; Rebs: not available Asts: not available	Arena: National tennis complex Republic of Srpska

10 September 2023	CSKA Moscow (Russia)	54–74	(Serbia) Partizan	Banja Luka
19:00	Scoring by quarter: 19–20, 7–13, 17–22, 11–19
Arena Sport	Pts: Ware 21; Rebs: Jekiri 11; Asts: Ware 3	Boxscore	Pts: PJ Dozier, Smailagić 13; Rebs: Koprivica 7 Asts: LeDay, Punter, Nunnally 3	Arena: National tennis complex Republic of Srpska

13 September 2023	Partizan (Serbia)	93–63	(Spain) Carplus Fuenlabrada	Belgrade
18:00	Scoring by quarter: 24–13, 26–15, 23–13, 20–22
Sport Klub	Pts: Punter 14; Rebs: not available Asts: not available	Boxscore	Pts: Aranitović 16; Rebs: not available Asts: not available	Arena: Tašmajdan Stadium; Attendance: 7,000

23 September 2023	Anadolu Efes (Turkey)	81–79	(Serbia) Partizan	Athens
16:00	Scoring by quarter: 12–23, 28–20, 14–18, 27–18
	Pts: Clyburn 16; Rebs: Žižić 9 Asts: Larkin 5	Boxscore	Pts: Anđušić 23; Rebs: not available Asts: not available	Arena: O.A.C.A. Olympic Indoor Hall

24 September 2023	Bayern Munich (Germany)	99–95	(Serbia) Partizan	Athens
16:00	Scoring by quarter: 22–22, 24–29, 28–21, 25–23
	Pts: Edwards 20; Rebs: not available Asts: not available	Boxscore	Pts: Nunnally 20; Rebs: not available Asts: not available	Arena: O.A.C.A. Olympic Indoor Hall

== Adriatic League ==
=== Regular season ===
Pos	Team	Pld	W	L	PF	PA	PD	Pts	Qualification or relegation
1	(Basketball Federation of Serbia) Crvena zvezda Meridianbet	26	22	4	2310	1877	+433	48	Advance to the Playoffs
2	(Basketball Federation of Serbia) Partizan Mozzart Bet	26	20	6	2423	1966	+457	46	Advance to the Playoffs
3	(Basketball Federation of Montenegro) Budućnost VOLI	26	19	7	2206	2002	+204	45	Advance to the Playoffs
4	(Basketball Federation of Serbia) Mega MIS	26	16	10	2246	2140	+106	42	Advance to the Playoffs
5	(Basketball Federation of Slovenia) Cedevita Olimpija	26	16	10	2235	2184	+51	42	Advance to the Playoffs

Source: ABA League

=== Matches ===
Win Loss

2 October 2023 1	Partizan (Serbia)	110–78	(Montenegro) Mornar Barsko zlato	Belgrade
19:00	Scoring by quarter: 34–21, 25–20, 22–20, 29–17
Arena Sport	Pts: Anđušić 23; Rebs: Ponitka 7 Asts: Jaramaz, Nunnally 4 PIR: Anđušić 26	Report	Pts: Gavrilović 19; Rebs: Kovačević, Mawien 4 Asts: Murray Jr. 6 PIR: Kovačević 17	Arena: Štark Arena; Attendance: 13,653; Referees: Tomislav Hordov, Krunoslav Peić, Gordan Terlević

8 October 2023 2	Krka (Slovenia)	56–96	(Serbia) Partizan	Novo Mesto
16:00	Scoring by quarter: 11–16, 11–29, 20–23, 14–28
Arena Sport	Pts: Cerkvenik, Hamilton 16; Rebs: Cerkvenik, Edosomwan, Škedelj, Macura 4 Asts: Špan 6 PIR: Cerkvenik 12	Report	Pts: Avramović 15; Rebs: Avramović, Trifunović 6 Asts: Jaramaz, Nunnally, Anđušić, PJ Dozier 3 PIR: Avramović 20	Arena: Leon Štukelj Hall; Attendance: 2,200; Referees: Matej Boltauzer, Milivoje Jovčić, Tomislav Vovk

14 October 2023 3	Partizan (Serbia)	96–67	(Croatia) Cibona	Belgrade
21:00	Scoring by quarter: 16–25, 20–17, 31–18, 29–7
Arena Sport	Pts: Nunnally 17; Rebs: Koprivica 6 Asts: Nunnally, Jaramaz 4 PIR: Nunnally 25	Report	Pts: Aranitović 21; Rebs: Bošnjak 7 Asts: Bošnjak, Mustapić, Stein 3 PIR: Aranitović 18	Arena: Štark Arena; Attendance: 8,113; Referees: Miloš Koljenšić, Igor Dragojević, Mario Majkić

23 October 2023 4	Mega MIS (Serbia)	88–86	(Serbia) Partizan	Belgrade
20:00	Scoring by quarter: 21–11, 19–18, 29–32, 19–25
Arena Sport	Pts: Đurišić 17; Rebs: Jelavić 10; Asts: Topić 8 PIR: Plavšić 19	Report	Pts: Avramović 26; Rebs: Kaminsky 6 Asts: Nunnally, Jaramaz, PJ Dozier 4 PIR: Kaminsky 34	Arena: Ranko Žeravica Sports Hall; Attendance: 1,500; Referees: Damir Javor, Sašo Petek, Denis Hadžić

30 October 2023 5	Partizan (Serbia)	98–87	(Serbia) Crvena zvezda Meridianbet	Belgrade
20:00	Scoring by quarter: 17–25, 30–11, 25–27, 26–24
Arena Sport	Pts: Kaminsky 22; Rebs: LeDay, Smailagić, PJ Dozier 4 Asts: PJ Dozier 8 PIR: Kaminsky 27	Report	Pts: Napier 23; Rebs: Giedraitis 6 Asts: Napier 8 PIR: Napier, Mitrović 20	Arena: Štark Arena; Attendance: 20,007; Referees: Matej Boltauzer, Tomislav Hordov, Uroš Nikolić

5 November 2023 6	Split (Croatia)	53–76	(Serbia) Partizan	Split
17:00	Scoring by quarter: 13–22, 16–22, 11–20, 13–12
Arena Sport, RTV B92	Pts: Funderburk Jr. 12; Rebs: Vuko 8 Asts: Perković 3 PIR: Funderburk Jr. 16	Report	Pts: Trifunović 13; Rebs: PJ Dozier 9 Asts: Avramović 7 PIR: PJ Dozier 18	Arena: Arena Gripe; Attendance: 2,000; Referees: Saša Pukl, Mario Majkić, Nermin Nikšić

12 November 2023 7	Partizan (Serbia)	89–91	(Bosnia and Herzegovina) Igokea	Belgrade
21:00	Scoring by quarter: 12–18, 22–30, 23–28, 32–15
Arena Sport, RTV B92	Pts: LeDay 16; Rebs: Kaminsky, Ponitka 5 Asts: Jaramaz 8 PIR: LeDay 21	Report	Pts: Jeremić, Tanasković 17; Rebs: Kondić 5 Asts: Atić, Milosavljević 4 PIR: Atić 18	Arena: Štark Arena; Attendance: 7,644; Referees: Miloš Koljenšić, Josip Radojković, Luka Kardum

20 November 2023 8	Cedevita Olimpija (Slovenia)	95–91	(Serbia) Partizan	Ljubljana
17:30	Scoring by quarter: 22–27, 29–23, 22–21, 22–20
Arena Sport, RTV B92	Pts: Blažič 29; Rebs: Jones 9 Asts: Prepelič 11; PIR: Prepelič 33	Report	Pts: Kaminsky 20; Rebs: Ponitka 8 Asts: PJ Dozier 7 PIR: Kaminsky 23	Arena: Arena Stožice; Attendance: 5,527; Referees: Ilija Belošević, Damir Javor, Marko Mustapić

27 November 2023 9	Partizan (Serbia)	101–56	(Serbia) Borac Čačak	Belgrade
20:00	Scoring by quarter: 24–16, 31–13, 31–14, 15–13
Arena Sport, RTV B92	Pts: Vukčević 24; Rebs: Caboclo 11; Asts: Ponitka 7 PIR: Vukčević 26	Report	Pts: Segu 16; Rebs: Rebrača 7 Asts: Talić 4 PIR: Rebrača 12	Arena: Štark Arena; Attendance: 6,102; Referees: Milivoje Jovčić, Marko Juras, Radoš Arsenijević

2 December 2023 10	FMP Meridian (Serbia)	61–105	(Serbia) Partizan	Belgrade
21:00	Scoring by quarter: 10–23, 9–30, 14–26, 28–26
Arena Sport, RTV B92	Pts: Živanović 12; Rebs: Subotić 6 Asts: Luke 5 PIR: Watson, Besson 10	Report	Pts: Vukčević, Koprivica, Punter 16; Rebs: Koprivica, Caboclo 10; Asts: Nunnally 7 PIR: Vukčević, Koprivica 22	Arena: Železnik Hall; Attendance: 470; Referees: Saša Pukl, Sašo Petek, Dragan Porobić

11 December 2023 11	Partizan (Serbia)	99–76	(Montenegro) SC Derby	Belgrade
20:00	Scoring by quarter: 31–13, 22–19, 20–28, 26–16
Arena Sport, RTV B92	Pts: LeDay 19; Rebs: Vukčević 6 Asts: Jaramaz 6 PIR: LeDay, Smailagić 20	Report	Pts: Drežnjak 14; Rebs: Kamenjaš 9 Asts: Drežnjak 4 PIR: Kamenjaš 14	Arena: Štark Arena; Attendance: 10,205; Referees: Milan Nedović, Denis Hadžić, Edo Javor

16 December 2023 12	Partizan (Serbia)	96–83	(Montenegro) Budućnost VOLI	Belgrade
21:00	Scoring by quarter: 21–28, 29–13, 28–23, 18–19
Arena Sport, RTV B92	Pts: Caboclo 21; Rebs: PJ Dozier 4 Asts: PJ Dozier 5 PIR: Caboclo 24	Report	Pts: Ferell 17; Rebs: Makoundou 6 Asts: Wright IV 7 PIR: Ferell 24	Arena: Štark Arena; Attendance: 13,314; Referees: Sašo Petek, Mario Majkić, Josip Radojković

24 December 2023 13	Zadar (Croatia)	84–68	(Serbia) Partizan	Zadar
17:00	Scoring by quarter: 20–13, 27–21, 16–16, 21–18
Arena Sport, RTV B92	Pts: Božić 26; Rebs: Božić 9 Asts: Božić 9 PIR: Božić 38	Report	Pts: Vukčević 16; Rebs: Nunnally 7 Asts: Nunnally 4 PIR: LeDay 17	Arena: Krešimir Ćosić Hall; Attendance: 8,500; Referees: Saša Pukl, Milan Nedović, Dragan Porobić

30 December 2023 14	Mornar Barsko zlato (Montenegro)	76–98	(Serbia) Partizan	Bar
18:00	Scoring by quarter: 18–22, 14–22, 24–23, 20–31
Arena Sport, RTV B92	Pts: Lewis 18; Rebs: Weathers 9 Asts: Waller, Murray Jr. 4 PIR: Weathers 19	Report	Pts: Anđušić 17; Rebs: Vukčević, Koprivica 8 Asts: Smith 6 PIR: Anđušić 16	Arena: Topolica Sport Hall; Attendance: 3,000; Referees: Sašo Petek, Tomislav Vovk, Tomislav Stapić

6 January 2024 15	Partizan (Serbia)	96–76	(Slovenia) Krka	Belgrade
19:00	Scoring by quarter: 30–14, 29–15, 21–23, 16–24
Arena Sport, RTV B92	Pts: Vukčević 16; Rebs: Vukčević, Koprivica 5 Asts: Punter 5 PIR: Vukčević 18	Report	Pts: Špan 15; Rebs: Radovanović 8 Asts: Bačvić 6 PIR: Macura 15	Arena: Štark Arena; Attendance: 7,337; Referees: Saša Pukl, Marko Mustapić, Aleksandar Davidov

15 January 2024 16	Cibona (Croatia)	74–87	(Serbia) Partizan	Zagreb
18:00	Scoring by quarter: 25–20, 13–20, 13–21, 23–26
Arena Sport, RTV B92	Pts: Aranitović 17; Rebs: Bošnjak 8 Asts: Aranitović 8 PIR: Aranitović 23	Report	Pts: Caboclo 18; Rebs: LeDay 6 Asts: Punter 5 PIR: Caboclo, Anđušić 22	Arena: Dražen Petrović Basketball Hall; Attendance: 4,000; Referees: Matej Boltauzer, Miloš Koljenšić, Edo Javor

22 January 2024 17	Partizan (Serbia)	112–80	(Serbia) Mega MIS	Belgrade
19:00	Scoring by quarter: 25–26, 34–13, 26–23, 27–18
Arena Sport, RTV B92	Pts: Nunnally 24; Rebs: Nunnally 6 Asts: Avramović 5 PIR: Nunnally 20	Report	Pts: Plavšić 26; Rebs: Plavšić, Jelavić, İlyasoğlu 4 Asts: Đurišić 8 PIR: Jelavić 22	Arena: Štark Arena; Attendance: 23,021; Referees: Milivoje Jovčić, Igor Dragojević, Sašo Petek

28 January 2024 18	Crvena zvezda Meridianbet (Serbia)	88–86	(Serbia) Partizan	Belgrade
19:00	Scoring by quarter: 28–15, 27–23, 17–18, 16–30
Arena Sport, RTV B92	Pts: Hanga 15; Rebs: Bolomboy 13; Asts: Teodosić 5 PIR: Bolomboy 24	Report	Pts: Nunnally 19; Rebs: LeDay 6 Asts: Nunnally, PJ Dozier, Avramović 4 PIR: Kaminsky 25	Arena: Štark Arena; Attendance: 18,796; Referees: Saša Pukl, Uroš Obrknežević, Josip Radojković

5 February 2024 19	Partizan (Serbia)	67–74	(Croatia) Split	Belgrade
19:00	Scoring by quarter: 19–17, 11–27, 15–15, 22–15
Arena Sport, RTV B92	Pts: Nunnally 10; Rebs: Ponitka 8 Asts: Jaramaz 6 PIR: Ponitka 16	Report	Pts: Shorter 18; Rebs: Shorter, Perković 8 Asts: Shorter, Perković 3 PIR: Shorter 18	Arena: Štark Arena; Attendance: 6,317; Referees: Milan Nedović, Tomislav Stapić, Nermin Nikšić

11 February 2024 20	Igokea (Bosnia and Herzegovina)	52–98	(Serbia) Partizan	Laktaši
17:00	Scoring by quarter: 21–23, 12–26, 10–23, 9–26
Arena Sport, RTV B92	Pts: Atić 10; Rebs: Kondić 4 Asts: Kondić 6 PIR: Atić 7	Report	Pts: Ponitka 16; Rebs: Koprivica 9 Asts: Punter 6 PIR: Koprivica 24	Arena: Laktaši Sports Hall; Attendance: 3,000; Referees: Igor Dragojević, Luka Kardum, Denis Hadžić

3 March 2024 21	Partizan (Serbia)	110–102	(Slovenia) Cedevita Olimpija	Belgrade
18:45	Scoring by quarter: 42–24, 28–33, 17–20, 23–25
Arena Sport, RTV B92	Pts: Anđušić 23; Rebs: Caboclo 7 Asts: Punter 6 PIR: Anđušić 27	Report	Pts: Dragić 22; Rebs: Omić 10; Asts: Cobbs 6 PIR: Dragić 27	Arena: Štark Arena; Attendance: 7,611; Referees: Milan Nedović, Dragan Porobić, Bojan Kruljac

11 March 2024 22	Borac Čačak (Serbia)	77–84	(Serbia) Partizan	Čačak
19:00	Scoring by quarter: 26–26, 15–23, 16–12, 20–23
Arena Sport, RTV B92	Pts: Tasić 17; Rebs: Tasić 6 Asts: Tasić 6 PIR: Tasić 31	Report	Pts: LeDay 18; Rebs: LeDay 9 Asts: Avramović 5 PIR: Avramović 26	Arena: Borac Hall; Attendance: 2,200; Referees: Tomislav Hordov, Luka Kardum, Krunoslav Peić

16 March 2024 23	Partizan (Serbia)	88–57	(Serbia) FMP Merdian	Belgrade
21:00	Scoring by quarter: 20–16, 23–15, 22–14, 23–12
Arena Sport, RTV B92	Pts: Koprivica 13; Rebs: Koprivica 10; Asts: Jaramaz 6 PIR: Koprivica 21	Report	Pts: Novak 13; Rebs: Kuzmić 10; Asts: Novak, Rebec 4 PIR: Kuzmić 11	Arena: Štark Arena; Attendance: 6,773; Referees: Uroš Nikolić, Sašo Petek, Stefan Ćalić

24 March 2024 24	SC Derby (Montenegro)	78–84	(Serbia) Partizan	Podgorica
17:00	Scoring by quarter: 26–20, 15–18, 17–25, 20–21
Arena Sport, RTV B92	Pts: Dawkins 21; Rebs: Hadžibegović 7 Asts: Kapusta 10; PIR: Kapusta 19	Report	Pts: Koprivica 20; Rebs: Koprivica 8 Asts: Anđušić, Nunnally 3 PIR: Koprivica 26	Arena: Morača Sports Center; Attendance: 1,650; Referees: Damir Javor, Josip Radojković, Luka Kardum

31 March 2024 25	Budućnost VOLI (Montenegro)	83–89	(Serbia) Partizan	Podgorica
19:30	Scoring by quarter: 21–23, 23–21, 19–26, 20–19
Arena Sport, RTV B92	Pts: Magee 17; Rebs: Kamenjaš 7 Asts: Ferrell 9 PIR: Kamenjaš 24	Report	Pts: LeDay 22; Rebs: LeDay 6 Asts: Punter 9 PIR: Punter 29	Arena: Morača Sports Center; Attendance: 5,100; Referees: Matej Boltauzer, Tomislav Hordov, Milan Nedović

8 April 2024 26	Partizan (Serbia)	113–74	(Croatia) Zadar	Belgrade
19:00	Scoring by quarter: 20–11, 35–30, 24–18, 34–15
Arena Sport, RTV B92	Pts: Avramović 18; Rebs: Koprivica 11; Asts: Avramović 8 PIR: Avramović 33	Report	Pts: Žganec, Drežnjak 15; Rebs: Božić 5 Asts: Božić 10; PIR: Božić 24	Arena: Štark Arena; Attendance: 4,497; Referees: Uroš Obrknežević, Luka Kardum, Tomislav Vovk

=== ABA League Playoffs ===
==== Quarterfinals ====
17 April 2024 G1	Partizan (Serbia)	94–85	(Bosnia and Herzegovina) Igokea	Belgrade
18:30	Scoring by quarter: 27–23, 27–22, 17–16, 23–24
Arena Sport, RTV B92	Pts: Punter 18; Rebs: Nunnally, Smailagić 5 Asts: Nunnally 6 PIR: Nunnally 20	Report	Pts: Nakić 21; Rebs: Jošilo 7 Asts: Nakić, Filipović 5 PIR: Carmichael 22	Arena: Štark Arena; Attendance: 4,417; Referees: Saša Pukl, Igor Dragojević, Denis Hadžić

21 April 2024 G2	Igokea (Bosnia and Herzegovina)	80–101	(Serbia) Partizan	Laktaši
18:00	Scoring by quarter: 16–27, 22–22, 17–24, 25–28
Arena Sport, RTV B92	Pts: Filipović 28; Rebs: Nakić 8 Asts: Nakić, Kondić, Stanković 4 PIR: Kondić 30	Report	Pts: LeDay 20; Rebs: Ponitka 12; Asts: Nunnally 9 PIR: Ponitka 26	Arena: Laktaši Sports Hall; Attendance: 2,800; Referees: Damir Javor, Tomislav Hordov, Miloš Koljenšić

==== Semifinals ====
30 April 2024 G1	Partizan (Serbia)	78–67	(Montenegro) Budućnost VOLI	Belgrade
18:30	Scoring by quarter: 27–16, 14–13, 18–18, 19–20
Arena Sport, RTV B92	Pts: LeDay 15; Rebs: Kaminsky 6 Asts: Smith 4 PIR: Avramović 19	Report	Pts: Makoundou 14; Rebs: Kamenjaš 13; Asts: Wright IV 7 PIR: Kamenjaš 19	Arena: Štark Arena; Attendance: 10,197; Referees: Saša Pukl, Josip Radojković, Marko Mustapić

7 May 2024 G2	Budućnost VOLI (Montenegro)	74–73	(Serbia) Partizan	Podgorica
18:00	Scoring by quarter: 20–23, 16–17, 26–17, 12–16
Arena Sport, RTV B92	Pts: Ferrell 13; Rebs: Kamenjaš 6 Asts: Ferrell 4 PIR: Kamenjaš 17	Report	Pts: Punter 17; Rebs: Smith 7 Asts: Smith 4 PIR: Smith 17	Arena: Morača Sports Center; Attendance: 4,800; Referees: Milan Nedović, Sašo Petek, Luka Kardum

10 May 2024 G3	Partizan (Serbia)	100–86	(Montenegro) Budućnost VOLI	Belgrade
19:00	Scoring by quarter: 23–21, 25–33, 25–17, 27–15
Arena Sport, RTV B92	Pts: Avramović 20; Rebs: Nunnally 6 Asts: Nunnally 5 PIR: Nunnally 27	Report	Pts: Ferrell 18; Rebs: Kamenjaš 8 Asts: Wright IV 6 PIR: Kamenjaš 21	Arena: Štark Arena; Attendance: 15,146; Referees: Saša Pukl, Damir Javor, Tomislav Hordov

==== Final ====
13 May 2024 G1	Crvena zvezda (Serbia)	85–82	(Serbia) Partizan	Belgrade
20:30	Scoring by quarter: 17– 20, 22–19, 25–22, 21–21
Arena Sport, RTV B92	Pts: dos Santos 18; Rebs: Davidovac 7 Asts: dos Santos 6 PIR: dos Santos 21	Report	Pts: Nunnally 27; Rebs: LeDay 8 Asts: Smith 3 PIR: Nunnally 33	Arena: Aleksandar Nikolić Hall; Attendance: 7,463; Referees: Saša Pukl, Milivoje Jovčić, Luka Kardum

15 May 2024 G2	Crvena zvezda (Serbia)	80–73	(Serbia) Partizan	Belgrade
19:30	Scoring by quarter: 17– 19, 21–19, 23–19, 19–16
Arena Sport, RTV B92	Pts: Nedović 21; Rebs: dos Santos, Giedraitis 5 Asts: Teodosić 7 PIR: Nedović 20	Report	Pts: Smith 12; Rebs: Nunnally, Caboclo 6 Asts: PJ Dozier 3 PIR: Avramović 13	Arena: Aleksandar Nikolić Hall; Attendance: 7,867; Referees: Damir Javor, Uroš Obrknežević, Miloš Koljenšić

19 May 2024 G3	Partizan (Serbia)	76–82	(Serbia) Crvena zvezda	Belgrade
20:30	Scoring by quarter: 18–20, 20–22, 14–17, 24–23
Arena Sport, RTV B92	Pts: Avramović 17; Rebs: PJ Dozier 6 Asts: PJ Dozier 6 PIR: PJ Dozier, Avramović 17	Report	Pts: Giedraitis, Mitrović 12; Rebs: Mitrović 8 Asts: Teodosić 6 PIR: Mitrović 23	Arena: Štark Arena; Attendance: 19,670; Referees: Uroš Nikolić, Milan Nedović, Josip Radojković

== EuroLeague ==
=== Regular season ===
Pos	Team	Pld	W	L	PF	PA	PD	Qualification
9	(Turkish Basketball Federation) Anadolu Efes	34	17	17	2871	2855	+16	Qualification to play-in
10	(Italian Basketball Federation) Virtus Segafredo Bologna	34	17	17	2728	2804	−76	Qualification to play-in
11	(Basketball Federation of Serbia) Partizan Mozzart Bet	34	16	18	2782	2802	−20	
12	(Italian Basketball Federation) EA7 Emporio Armani Milan	34	15	19	2645	2631	+14	
13	(Spanish Basketball Federation) Valencia Basket	34	14	20	2578	2674	−96	

Source: EuroLeague
Rules for classification: All points scored in extra period(s) were not counted in the standings, nor for any tie-break situation.

=== Matches ===
Win Loss

5 October 2023 1	Maccabi Tel Aviv (Israel)	96–81	(Serbia) Partizan	Tel Aviv
20:05	Scoring by quarter: 27–16, 28–27, 19–15, 22–23
Sport Klub	Pts: Brown 22; Rebs: Colson 7 Asts: Brown, Blatt 8 PIR: Brown 25	Report	Pts: Avramović 24; Rebs: LeDay, Koprivica, Smailagić, Nunnally, Trifunović 3 Asts: Jaramaz, PJ Dozier 3 PIR: Avramović 23	Arena: Menora Mivtachim Arena; Attendance: 10,559; Referees: Miguel Ángel Pérez, Gytis Vilius, Luka Kardum

12 October 2023 2	LDLC ASVEL (France)	62–88	(Serbia) Partizan	Villeurbanne
20:00	Scoring by quarter: 13–17, 16–26, 19–29, 14–16
Sport Klub	Pts: Jackson 16; Rebs: Lauvergne, Luwawu-Cabarrot, de Colo 5 Asts: Jackson 3 PIR: Jackson, Luwawu-Cabarrot 11	Report	Pts: Nunnally 17; Rebs: LeDay 7 Asts: Nunnally 6 PIR: LeDay 27	Arena: Astroballe; Attendance: 5,328; Referees: Robert Lottermoser, Emin Moğulkoç, Josip Radojković

17 October 2023 3	Partizan (Serbia)	83–92	(Spain) FC Barcelona Bàsquet	Belgrade
18:30	Scoring by quarter: 16–23, 18–21, 26–25, 23–23
Sport Klub	Pts: Nunnally 14; Rebs: LeDay 5 Asts: PJ Dozier 5 PIR: LeDay 17	Report	Pts: Laprovíttola 20; Rebs: Parker 11; Asts: Satoranský, Laprovíttola 6 PIR: Laprovíttola, Veselý 22	Arena: Štark Arena; Attendance: 19,227; Referees: Fernando Rocha, Piotr Pastusiak, Artūras Šukys

19 October 2023 4	Olympiacos (Greece)	98–94(OT)	(Serbia) Partizan	Piraeus
20:15	Scoring by quarter: 28–21, 21–22, 10–26, 26–16, Overtime: 13–9
Sport Klub	Pts: Larentzakis 19; Rebs: Papanikolaou, Milutinov 7 Asts: Walkup 4 PIR: Milutinov 30	Report	Pts: LeDay 18; Rebs: LeDay, Punter 5 Asts: LeDay 4 PIR: LeDay 24	Arena: Peace and Friendship Stadium; Attendance: 11,579; Referees: Carmelo Paternicò, Jordi Aliaga Solé, Mario Majkić

26 October 2023 5	Partizan (Serbia)	88–86	(Serbia) Crvena zvezda Meridianbet	Belgrade
18:30	Scoring by quarter: 22–13, 20–29, 11–23, 35–21
Sport Klub	Pts: Avramović 14; Rebs: Kaminsky 5 Asts: LeDay, Nunnally 4 PIR: LeDay 20	Report	Pts: Bolomboy 16; Rebs: Mitrović 8 Asts: Teodosić 6 PIR: Mitrović 19	Arena: Štark Arena; Attendance: 20,039; Referees: Miguel Ángel Pérez, Gytis Vilius, Rain Peerandi

3 November 2023 6	Saski Baskonia (Spain)	84–83	(Serbia) Partizan	Vitoria-Gasteiz
20:30	Scoring by quarter: 23–23, 25–19, 15–24, 21–17
Sport Klub	Pts: Moneke 16; Rebs: Miller-McIntyre, Sedekerskis 8 Asts: Miller-McIntyre 8 PIR: Sedekerskis 22	Report	Pts: Nunnally 16; Rebs: Kaminsky 7 Asts: Kaminsky 5 PIR: Kaminsky 21	Arena: Fernando Buesa Arena; Attendance: 9,208; Referees: Robert Lottermoser, Milan Nedović, Jurgis Laurinavičius

9 November 2023 7	Partizan (Serbia)	85–84	(Turkey) Fenerbahçe Beko	Belgrade
20:30	Scoring by quarter: 23–27, 24–29, 16–13, 22–15
Sport Klub	Pts: Kaminsky 15; Rebs: LeDay 7 Asts: LeDay, PJ Dozier 5 PIR: Smailagić 15	Report	Pts: Hayes 23; Rebs: Hayes, Papagiannis 6 Asts: Dorsey 5 PIR: Hayes 35	Arena: Štark Arena; Attendance: 20,058; Referees: Carlos Peruga Embid, Marcin Kowalski, Thomas Bissuel

15 November 2023 8	Bayern Munich (Germany)	94–85	(Serbia) Partizan	Munich
20:30	Scoring by quarter: 25–32, 28–19, 17–12, 24–22
Sport Klub	Pts: Edwards 21; Rebs: Booker 11; Asts: Francisco 6 PIR: Edwards 23	Report	Pts: Caboclo 19; Rebs: Nunnally 8 Asts: PJ Dozier 5 PIR: Caboclo 23	Arena: BMW Park; Attendance: 6,365; Referees: Fernando Rocha, Tomislav Hordov, Kristaps Konstantinovs

17 November 2023 9	Partizan (Serbia)	89–74	(Germany) Alba Berlin	Belgrade
20:45	Scoring by quarter: 18–20, 25–20, 22–15, 24–19
Sport Klub	Pts: Avramović 20; Rebs: Caboclo 5 Asts: Nunnally 6 PIR: Nunnally 21	Report	Pts: Thiemann 21; Rebs: Koumadje 11; Asts: Delow 8 PIR: Thiemann 25	Arena: Štark Arena; Attendance: 18,912; Referees: Emilio Pérez Pizarro, Jakub Zamojski, Maxime Boubert

24 November 2023 10	Anadolu Efes (Turkey)	100–94	(Serbia) Partizan	Istanbul
18:30	Scoring by quarter: 22–22, 28–23, 14–29, 36–20
Sport Klub	Pts: Larkin 27; Rebs: Larkin, Beaubois, Jones 3 Asts: Larkin 8 PIR: Larkin 38	Report	Pts: Kaminsky 24; Rebs: Nunnally 8 Asts: Jaramaz, PJ Dozier 5 PIR: Nunnally 23	Arena: Sinan Erdem Dome; Attendance: 10,507; Referees: Miguel Ángel Pérez, Joseph Bissang, Igor Dragojević

30 November 2023 11	Partizan (Serbia)	92–87(OT)	(Greece) Panathinaikos	Belgrade
20:45	Scoring by quarter: 21–20, 19–17, 15–18, 24–22, Overtime: 14–9
Sport Klub	Pts: LeDay 23; Rebs: Anđušić 8 Asts: PJ Dozier 4 PIR: LeDay 24	Report	Pts: Nunn 19; Rebs: Mitoglou 7 Asts: Sloukas, Grant 5 PIR: Nunn 18	Arena: Štark Arena; Attendance: 20,079; Referees: Emin Moğulkoç, Oļegs Latiševs, Jordi Aliaga Solé

5 December 2023 12	Partizan (Serbia)	89–85(OT)	(France) Monaco	Belgrade
20:30	Scoring by quarter: 16–13, 16–22, 19–16, 21–21, Overtime: 17–13
Sport Klub	Pts: Punter 25; Rebs: Caboclo 6 Asts: PJ Dozier 7 PIR: Nunnally 25	Report	Pts: Motiejūnas 23; Rebs: James 8 Asts: James 8 PIR: Motiejūnas 20	Arena: Štark Arena; Attendance: 19,974; Referees: Juan Carlos García, Matej Boltauzer, Guido Giovannetti

7 December 2023 13	Partizan (Serbia)	82–69	(Italy) EA7 Emporio Armani Milan	Belgrade
20:30	Scoring by quarter: 20–25, 19–19, 22–18, 21–7
Sport Klub	Pts: Punter 19; Rebs: Smailagić 6 Asts: PJ Dozier 4 PIR: Punter 22	Report	Pts: Shields 19; Rebs: Melli 6 Asts: Lô 5 PIR: Shields 19	Arena: Štark Arena; Attendance: 20,033; Referees: Sreten Radović, Carlos Cortes, Mario Majkić

14 December 2023 14	Žalgiris Kaunas (Lithuania)	85–93	(Serbia) Partizan	Kaunas
19:00	Scoring by quarter: 21–29, 23–29, 20–18, 21–17
Sport Klub	Pts: Evans 33; Rebs: Lavrinovičius 8 Asts: Evans, Dimša 4 PIR: Evans 38	Report	Pts: Punter 22; Rebs: PJ Dozier, Caboclo, LeDay 7 Asts: PJ Dozier 4 PIR: PJ Dozier 27	Arena: Žalgiris Arena; Attendance: 14,705; Referees: Saša Pukl, Emilio Pérez Pizarro, Nick Van den Broeck

19 December 2023 15	Valencia Basket (Spain)	67–72	(Serbia) Partizan	Valencia
21:00	Scoring by quarter: 14–19, 20–14, 10–20, 23–19
Sport Klub	Pts: Jones 14; Rebs: Inglis 7 Asts: Jones, Davies 4 PIR: Jones 16	Report	Pts: LeDay, Nunnally 14; Rebs: Punter 9 Asts: Punter, Nunnally 3 PIR: Punter 25	Arena: Font de Sant Lluís; Attendance: 7,184; Referees: Fernando Rocha, Piotr Pastusiak, Leandro Lezcano

21 December 2023 16	Real Madrid (Spain)	91–75	(Serbia) Partizan	Madrid
20:45	Scoring by quarter: 26–19, 22–17, 28–15, 15–24
Sport Klub	Pts: Musa 23; Rebs: Tavares 8 Asts: Rodríguez 9 PIR: Musa 27	Report	Pts: Caboclo 18; Rebs: Ponitka 7 Asts: Nunnally 4 PIR: Koprivica 15	Arena: WiZink Center; Attendance: 9,563; Referees: Robert Lottermoser, Joseph Bissang, Kristaps Konstantinovs

28 December 2023 17	Partizan (Serbia)	75–77	(Italy) Virtus Segafredo Bologna	Belgrade
18:30	Scoring by quarter: 18–23, 18–18, 19–19, 20–17
Sport Klub	Pts: Nunnally 19; Rebs: Jaramaz 6 Asts: Nunnally 6 PIR: Jaramaz 20	Report	Pts: Lundberg 16; Rebs: Dunston 6 Asts: Shengelia, Hackett 4 PIR: Lundberg 20	Arena: Štark Arena; Attendance: 20,086; Referees: Emin Moğulkoç, Artūras Šukys, Eduard Udyanskyy

2 January 2024 18	Partizan (Serbia)	90–77	(France) LDLC ASVEL	Belgrade
20:45	Scoring by quarter: 23–17, 27–14, 19–14, 21–32
Sport Klub	Pts: Punter 22; Rebs: Kaminsky 7 Asts: Nunnally 4 PIR: Punter 22	Report	Pts: Scott 24; Rebs: Scott 10; Asts: Lee 10; PIR: Scott 28	Arena: Štark Arena; Attendance: 20,012; Referees: Miguel Ángel Pérez, Ioannis Foufis, Gytis Vilius

4 January 2024 19	Crvena zvezda Meridianbet (Serbia)	88–72	(Serbia) Partizan	Belgrade
20:00	Scoring by quarter: 24–13, 26–16, 15–19, 23–24
Sport Klub	Pts: Nedović 16; Rebs: Giedraitis 7 Asts: Teodosić 7 PIR: Teodosić 23	Report	Pts: Punter 17; Rebs: Caboclo 7 Asts: Nunnally, PJ Dozier 3 PIR: Caboclo 18	Arena: Štark Arena; Attendance: 20,143; Referees: Fernando Rocha, Carlos Peruga Embid, Piotr Pastusiak

9 January 2024 20	Fenerbahçe Beko (Turkey)	91–76	(Serbia) Partizan	Istanbul
18:30	Scoring by quarter: 19–31, 24–17, 25–16, 23–12
Sport Klub	Pts: Dorsey 24; Rebs: Hayes 7 Asts: Calathes 7 PIR: Dorsey 23	Report	Pts: Punter 18; Rebs: LeDay 6 Asts: PJ Dozier 6 PIR: Punter, Caboclo 14	Arena: Ülker Sports Arena; Attendance: 9,375; Referees: Mehdi Difallah, Milan Nedović, Jordi Aliaga Solé

12 January 2024 21	Partizan (Serbia)	88–79	(Israel) Maccabi Tel Aviv	Belgrade
20:30	Scoring by quarter: 11–29, 25–23, 31–15, 21–12
Sport Klub	Pts: PJ Dozier 23; Rebs: Nunnally 9 Asts: Nunnally 5 PIR: PJ Dozier 26	Report	Pts: Baldwin IV 19; Rebs: Colson 8 Asts: Baldwin IV, Blatt 5 PIR: Baldwin IV 20	Arena: Štark Arena; Attendance: 20,066; Referees: Matej Boltauzer, Jakub Zamojski, Rain Peerandi

19 January 2024 22	Panathinaikos (Greece)	84–71	(Serbia) Partizan	Athens
20:15	Scoring by quarter: 18–16, 24–24, 16–18, 26–13
Sport Klub	Pts: Nunn 21; Rebs: Lessort 9 Asts: Grant 5 PIR: Mitoglou 21	Report	Pts: PJ Dozier 16; Rebs: PJ Dozier 7 Asts: PJ Dozier 8 PIR: PJ Dozier 28	Arena: O.A.C.A. Olympic Indoor Hall; Attendance: 18,421; Referees: Juan Carlos García, Emin Moğulkoç, Maxime Boubert

26 January 2024 23	Partizan (Serbia)	81–72	(Lithuania) Žalgiris Kaunas	Belgrade
20:30	Scoring by quarter: 22–26, 23–17, 16–16, 20–13
Sport Klub	Pts: PJ Dozier 23; Rebs: LeDay, Punter 5 Asts: PJ Dozier 4 PIR: LeDay 32	Report	Pts: Evans 25; Rebs: Šmits 6 Asts: Evans, Ulanovas 3 PIR: Evans 23	Arena: Štark Arena; Attendance: 20,017; Referees: Emilio Pérez Pizarro, Tomislav Hordov, Vassilis Pitsilkas

31 January 2024 24	Monaco (France)	85–70	(Serbia) Partizan	Fontvieille
19:00	Scoring by quarter: 14–16, 30–22, 21–23, 20–9
Sport Klub	Pts: James 19; Rebs: Motiejūnas, Jaiteh 6 Asts: James 7 PIR: James 31	Report	Pts: Punter 28; Rebs: PJ Dozier 5 Asts: Avramović 5 PIR: Punter 31	Arena: Salle Gaston Médecin; Attendance: 3,673; Referees: Miguel Ángel Pérez, Jordi Aliaga Solé, Josip Radojković

2 February 2024 25	Virtus Segafredo Bologna (Italy)	88–84	(Serbia) Partizan	Bologna
20:30	Scoring by quarter: 19–19, 16–12, 27–27, 26–26
Sport Klub	Pts: Lundberg, Belinelli 20; Rebs: Dunston 6 Asts: Belinelli, Pajola, Hackett 4 PIR: Lundberg 26	Report	Pts: Punter 22; Rebs: PJ Dozier 4 Asts: PJ Dozier 3 PIR: Punter 18	Arena: Virtus Segafredo Arena; Attendance: 9,544; Referees: Robert Lottermoser, Saša Pukl, Tomasz Trawicki

8 February 2024 26	Partizan (Serbia)	78–79	(Germany) Bayern Munich	Belgrade
20:30	Scoring by quarter: 23–26, 22–15, 18–18, 15–20
Sport Klub	Pts: Punter 22; Rebs: Kaminsky 7 Asts: Kaminsky 3 PIR: Kaminsky, Punter 21	Report	Pts: Francisco 20; Rebs: Bonga 7 Asts: Weiler-Babb 6 PIR: Francisco 25	Arena: Štark Arena; Attendance: 20,174; Referees: Fernando Rocha, Carlos Peruga Embid, Saulius Racys

29 February 2024 27	Partizan (Serbia)	100–90	(Turkey) Anadolu Efes	Belgrade
20:30	Scoring by quarter: 17–20, 26–20, 21–19, 36–31
Sport Klub	Pts: Avramović 30; Rebs: LeDay 8 Asts: Ponitka 4 PIR: Avramović 32	Report	Pts: Clyburn 17; Rebs: Larkin 5 Asts: Larkin 6 PIR: Larkin, Clyburn 21	Arena: Štark Arena; Attendance: 20,200; Referees: Mehdi Difallah, Gytis Vilius, Kristaps Konstantinovs

8 March 2024 28	EA7 Emporio Armani Milan (Italy)	85–83	(Serbia) Partizan	Milan
20:30	Scoring by quarter: 22–21, 19–19, 23–27, 21–16
Sport Klub	Pts: Shields, Mirotić 19; Rebs: Voigtmann 7 Asts: Shields 6 PIR: Shields 27	Report	Pts: Avramović 19; Rebs: Caboclo 5 Asts: Avramović 3 PIR: Avramović 18	Arena: Mediolanum Forum; Attendance: 12,016; Referees: Emin Moğulkoç, Joseph Bissang, Carlos Cortes

14 March 2024 29	FC Barcelona Bàsquet (Spain)	94–76	(Serbia) Partizan	Barcelona
20:30	Scoring by quarter: 29–24, 22–24, 23–20, 20–8
Sport Klub	Pts: Laprovíttola 17; Rebs: Rubio 6 Asts: Rubio 6 PIR: Veselý 17	Report	Pts: Avramović 27; Rebs: LeDay 6 Asts: Avramović, Punter 3 PIR: Avramović 25	Arena: Palau Blaugrana; Attendance: 7,047; Referees: Oļegs Latiševs, Piotr Pastusiak, Artūras Šukys

19 March 2024 30	Partizan (Serbia)	87–83	(Spain) Saski Baskonia	Belgrade
20:30	Scoring by quarter: 23–16, 21–26, 25–18, 18–23
Sport Klub	Pts: Kaminsky 20; Rebs: Caboclo 13; Asts: Punter 6 PIR: Caboclo 28	Report	Pts: Howard 26; Rebs: Costello 7 Asts: Miller-McIntyre 6 PIR: Costello 18	Arena: Štark Arena; Attendance: 20,174; Referees: Robert Lottermoser, Gytis Vilius, Robert Vyklicky

21 March 2024 31	Partizan (Serbia)	76–88	(Spain) Real Madrid	Belgrade
20:30	Scoring by quarter: 13–13, 18–20, 23–35, 22–20
Sport Klub	Pts: Kaminsky 19; Rebs: Punter 7 Asts: Punter, Nunnally 3 PIR: Nunnally 21	Report	Pts: Hezonja 25; Rebs: Poirier 8 Asts: Campazzo 8 PIR: Hezonja 33	Arena: Štark Arena; Attendance: 20,200; Referees: Fernando Rocha, Jakub Zamojski, Rain Peerandi

28 March 2024 32	Partizan (Serbia)	69–74	(Greece) Olympiacos	Belgrade
20:30	Scoring by quarter: 22–17, 18–15, 19–14, 10–28
Sport Klub	Pts: Punter 19; Rebs: PJ Dozier 9 Asts: Punter, Kaminsky 5 PIR: Punter 20	Report	Pts: Williams-Goss 17; Rebs: Fall, Larentzakis 4 Asts: Williams-Goss, Walkup 3 PIR: Williams-Goss 19	Arena: Štark Arena; Attendance: 20,186; Referees: Juan Carlos García, Mehdi Difallah, Carlos Cortes

4 April 2024 33	Alba Berlin (Germany)	83–94	(Serbia) Partizan	Berlin
20:30	Scoring by quarter: 15–23, 19–24, 28–25, 21–22
Sport Klub	Pts: Thiemann 20; Rebs: Thiemann 11; Asts: Hermannsson 8 PIR: Thiemann 29	Report	Pts: Nunnally 19; Rebs: Punter, LeDay 6 Asts: Nunnally, PJ Dozier 4 PIR: Punter 21	Arena: Uber Arena; Attendance: 11,509; Referees: Emilio Pérez Pizarro, Ioannis Foufis, Kristaps Konstantinovs

12 April 2024 34	Partizan (Serbia)	79–66	(Spain) Valencia Basket	Belgrade
20:30	Scoring by quarter: 15–21, 20–16, 23–15, 21–14
Sport Klub	Pts: Nunnally 19; Rebs: LeDay 7 Asts: Punter 5 PIR: Nunnally 27	Report	Pts: Ojeleye 17; Rebs: Davies 6 Asts: Harper, Jones 4 PIR: Ojeleye 22	Arena: Štark Arena; Attendance: 19,137; Referees: Fernando Rocha, Milan Nedović, Gytis Vilius

== Adriatic Supercup ==
Win Loss

=== Matches ===
Win Loss

18 September 2023 Quarterfinals	Partizan (Serbia)	89–78	(Serbia) Mega MIS	Podgorica
15:00	Scoring by quarter: 25–25, 26–18, 16–24, 22–11
Arena Sport	Pts: Nunnally 13; Rebs: Smailagić 5 Asts: LeDay, Punter, Anđušić, PJ Dozier 2 PIR: LeDay 15	Report	Pts: Jelavić 21; Rebs: Topić 9 Asts: İlyasoğlu 6 PIR: Jelavić 26	Arena: Morača Sports Center; Attendance: 1,600; Referees: Miloš Koljenšić, Radoš Savović, Vojislav Lepetić

19 September 2023 Semifinals	Partizan (Serbia)	91–84	(Bosnia and Herzegovina) Igokea	Podgorica
18:00	Scoring by quarter: 27–13, 24–18, 29–29, 11–24
Arena Sport	Pts: Smailagić 15; Rebs: Nunnally, Koprivica 5 Asts: Avramović 4 PIR: Punter, Smailagić 17	Report	Pts: Jeremić 23; Rebs: Nikolić 12; Asts: Gordić 7 PIR: Nikolić 26	Arena: Morača Sports Center; Attendance: 1,760; Referees: Miloš Koljenšić, Sašo Petek, Vojislav Lepetić

20 September 2023 Final	Partizan (Serbia)	81–83	(Montenegro) SC Derby	Podgorica
21:00	Scoring by quarter: 22–25, 18–17, 26–21, 15–20
Arena Sport	Pts: Punter 23; Rebs: Koprivica 5 Asts: Avramović, PJ Dozier 3 PIR: Punter 27	Report	Pts: Dawkins 18; Rebs: Kamenjaš 8 Asts: Kapusta 5 PIR: Kamenjaš 22	Arena: Morača Sports Center; Attendance: 2,650; Referees: Luka Kardum, Josip Radojković, Marko Mustapić

== Radivoj Korać Cup ==
Win Loss

15 February 2024 Quarterfinal	Partizan	92–67	Hercegovac Gajdobra	Niš
20:00	Scoring by quarter: 14–13, 23–16, 27–19, 28–19
Arena Sport	Pts: Vukčević 15; Rebs: Koprivica 14; Asts: Avramović 7 PIR: Koprivica 27	Boxscore	Pts: Dimić, Marić 14; Rebs: Brekić 7 Asts: Todorić 7 PIR: Todorić 16	Arena: Čair Sports Center; Attendance: 4,750

16 February 2024 Semifinal	Vojvodina	67–80	Partizan	Niš
21:00	Scoring by quarter: 22–24, 14–19, 14–17, 17–20
Arena Sport	Pts: Cunningham 17; Rebs: Johnson 8 Asts: Ašćerić, Rakićević 3 PIR: Cunningham 18	Boxscore	Pts: Nunnally, Kaminsky 15; Rebs: Kaminsky 6 Asts: Nunnally, Jaramaz 3 PIR: Nunnally 22	Arena: Čair Sports Center; Attendance: 4,850

17 February 2024 Final	Crvena zvezda Meridianbet	85–79	Partizan	Niš
21:00	Scoring by quarter: 15–18, 28–26, 25–19, 17–16
Arena Sport	Pts: Giedraitis 17; Rebs: Mitrović 6 Asts: dos Santos, Teodosić 5 PIR: Teodosić 27	Boxscore	Pts: LeDay 24; Rebs: Punter 9 Asts: PJ Dozier, Kaminsky 4 PIR: LeDay 37	Arena: Čair Sports Center; Attendance: 5,000

== Serbian Super League ==
Win Loss

=== Semifinals ===
24 May 2024 G1	Partizan	82–72	Mega MIS	Belgrade
18:30	Scoring by quarter: 22–22, 18–20, 23–13, 19–17
Arena Sport	Pts: Trifunović 23; Rebs: Trifunović 8 Asts: Avramović 5 PIR: Trifunović 25	Boxscore	Pts: Jović 15; Rebs: Marković 12; Asts: İlyasoğlu, Đurišić 7 PIR: Đurišić 15	Arena: Štark Arena; Attendance: 3,269; Referees: Marko Juras, Vladimir Jevtović, Siniša Prpa

27 May 2024 G2	Mega MIS	92–88	Partizan	Belgrade
20:00	Scoring by quarter: 18–28, 23–19, 26–15, 25–26
Arena Sport	Pts: Jović 14; Rebs: Jelavić 7 Asts: Petrović 5 PIR: Phillips Jr 16	Boxscore	Pts: Caboclo 18; Rebs: Trifunović 7 Asts: Ponitka 4 PIR: Caboclo 23	Arena: Dejan Milojević Hall; Attendance: 326; Referees: Uroš Obrknežević, Ivan Stefanović, Petar Pešić

30 May 2024 G3	Partizan	96–68	Mega MIS	Belgrade
18:00	Scoring by quarter: 39–9, 8–22, 23–16, 26–21
Arena Sport	Pts: LeDay 17; Rebs: Caboclo 8 Asts: Avramović 9 PIR: Avramović 23	Boxscore	Pts: Jović 21; Rebs: Jelavić 6 Asts: Petrović 5 PIR: Jović 22	Arena: Aleksandar Nikolić Hall; Attendance: 1,526; Referees: Uroš Nikolić, Vladimir Jevtović, Stefan Ćalić

=== Final ===
3 June 2024 G1	Crvena zvezda m:ts	89–88	Partizan	Belgrade
20:00	Scoring by quarter: 31–24, 20–28, 26–21, 12–15
Arena Sport	Pts: Davidovac 23; Rebs: Davidovac 9 Asts: dos Santos 7 PIR: Davidovac 34	Boxscore	Pts: Avramović 20; Rebs: Avramović, LeDay 6 Asts: Avramović 6 PIR: Avramović 29	Arena: Aleksandar Nikolić Hall; Attendance: 6,135; Referees: Milivoje Jovčić, Uroš Obrknežević, Vladimir Jevtović

5 June 2024 G2	Partizan	0–20	Crvena zvezda m:ts	Belgrade
20:00
Arena Sport		Boxscore		Arena: Štark Arena; Attendance: 12,184; Referees: Uroš Nikolić, Marko Juras, Stefan Ćalić
Note: The match was stopped at 57:45 for Partizan. By the decision of KLS, the match was registered with a score of 0:20.

== Individual awards ==
Adriatic League

MVP of the Round

- (Serbia) Aleksa Avramović – Semifinal Game 1
- (United States) James Nunnally – Semifinal Game 3

Ideal Starting Five

- (United States) Zach LeDay

Serbian League

MVP of the Round

- (Serbia) Aleksa Avramović – Semifinal Game 3

Euroleague

MVP of the Round

- (United States) Kevin Punter – Round 15
- (United States) James Nunnally – Round 34
