= Dontay Caruthers =

American basketball player (born 1995)

Studentski centar
- Position: Point guard
- League: Prva A Liga; ABA League

Personal information
- Born: June 23, 1995 (age 31) Rochester, New York, U.S.
- Listed height: 6 ft 1 in (1.85 m)
- Listed weight: 180 lb (82 kg)

Career information
- College: Indian Hills (2015–2016); Buffalo (2016–2019)
- NBA draft: 2019: undrafted
- Playing career: 2019–present

Career history
- 2019: Grand Rapids Drive
- 2019: Agua Caliente Clippers
- 2020: Science City Jena
- 2021: Široki
- 2022: Pelister
- 2023–2024: Bosna
- 2024–2025: Inter Bratislava
- 2025–2026: Dziki Warszawa
- 2026: Bosna
- 2026–present: Studentski centar

Dontay Latrai Caruthers (born June 23, 1995) is an American professional basketball player for Studentski centar of the Prva A Liga and the ABA League. He played college basketball for the Buffalo Bulls. Caruthers is a point guard. He has competed professionally in the United States and across several European leagues.

== Early life ==
Caruthers was born in Rochester, New York, and attended East High School. During his senior season, he was named Greater Rochester Player of the Year and earned Class A first-team All-State honors after leading his team in scoring and assists.

Caruthers began his collegiate career at Midland College in Texas before transferring to Indian Hills Community College. He later moved to the University at Buffalo, where he played for the Buffalo Bulls from 2016 to 2019.

At Buffalo, he was named as the MAC Defensive Player of the Year in 2017 and 2019, earning multiple All-MAC Defensive Team selections.

== Professional career ==
After going undrafted in the 2019 NBA Draft, Caruthers signed with the Grand Rapids Drive of the NBA G League. He later appeared for the Agua Caliente Clippers before beginning his professional career in Europe.

Caruthers joined Science City Jena in Germany's ProA league in 2020, marking the start of an extended European career.

He later played in the Adriatic League system for HKK Široki and Pelister, competing in the ABA League Second Division. During this period, he earned recognition for his performances, including being named an ABA League Round MVP.

In the 2023–24 season, Caruthers signed with KK Bosna BH Telecom in Bosnia and Herzegovina. With Bosna, he won the Mirza Delibašić Cup and played a role in the club's domestic and regional campaigns.

During the 2024–25 season, Caruthers played for Inter Bratislava in the European North Basketball League (ENBL), where he was named the league's Defensive Player of the Year. He also set a league record by scoring 41 points in a single ENBL game.

In 2025, he signed with Dziki Warszawa of the Polish Basketball League, continuing his professional career in Poland.

In January 2026, he rejoined KK Bosna.

== Career awards ==
- 2× MAC Defensive Player of the Year (2017, 2019)
- All-MAC Defensive Team (multiple selections)
- ENBL Defensive Player of the Year (2025)
- Mirza Delibašić Cup champion (2024, 2026)
