= Stephen Brown Jr. =

American basketball player (born 1996)

Free agent
- Position: Point guard

Personal information
- Born: March 27, 1996 (age 30) Fairfax, Virginia, U.S.
- Listed height: 5 ft 11 in (1.80 m)
- Listed weight: 165 lb (75 kg)

Career information
- High school: Christ Chapel Academy (Woodbridge, Virginia)
- College: Bucknell (2014–2018)
- NBA draft: 2018: undrafted
- Playing career: 2018–present

Career history
- 2018: Yalova Group Belediyespor
- 2018–2019: BC Valga-Valka
- 2019: Ural Yekaterinburg
- 2019–2020: Giessen 46ers
- 2020: London Lions
- 2020–2021: Denain ASC Voltaire
- 2021–2022: BG Göttingen
- 2022–2023: Fos Provence Basket
- 2023–2024: Spójnia Stargard
- 2024–2025: Basketball Nymburk
- 2025: PAOK Thessaloniki
- 2025–2026: Pallacanestro Reggiana

Career highlights
- Czech NBL champion (2025); Czech Cup winner (2025); Czechoslovak Cup winner (2025); Patriot League Tournament MVP (2018); First-team All-Patriot League (2018); Second-team All-Patriot League (2017); 3× Patriot League All-Defensive Team (2016–2018)

Stephen Lawrence Brown Jr. (born March 27, 1996) is an American professional basketball player who is currently a free agent. He most recently played for Pallacanestro Reggiana of the Italian Lega Basket Serie A (LBA). A 5 ft 11 in (1.80 m) point guard, Brown played college basketball for the Bucknell Bison before beginning his professional career in Europe in 2018.

== Early life ==
Brown was born in Fairfax, Virginia, and grew up in Manassas, Virginia. He attended Christ Chapel Academy in Woodbridge, Virginia, where he was basketball captain and team MVP in each of his four high school seasons.

Brown finished his high school career as Christ Chapel's all-time leading scorer with 2,512 points, while also recording 533 assists, 483 steals and 578 rebounds. He became the first athlete in the school's history to have his jersey retired and the first to receive an NCAA Division I athletic scholarship.

== College career ==
Brown played four seasons at Bucknell University from 2014 to 2018. After becoming a regular starter during his freshman season, he developed into one of the leading point guards in the Patriot League. He was selected to the Patriot League All-Defensive Team three times during his college career.

As a junior in 2016–17, Brown averaged 11.1 points and 4.8 assists per game and was named Second Team All-Patriot League and to the Patriot League All-Defensive Team.

During his senior season in 2017–18, Brown averaged a career-high 15.1 points and 4.3 assists per game. He was named First Team All-Patriot League and to the league's All-Defensive Team. Brown was also named MVP of the 2018 Patriot League Tournament after helping Bucknell win the conference championship and qualify for the 2018 NCAA Division I men's basketball tournament.

Brown finished his Bucknell career with 1,309 points and 524 assists. At the time of his graduation, his 524 assists ranked third in Bucknell history and seventh in Patriot League history.

== Professional career ==
=== Early professional career (2018–2021) ===
After going undrafted in the 2018 NBA draft, Brown began his professional career during the 2018–19 season. He played for three teams during his rookie professional season: Yalova Group Belediyespor in Turkey, BC Valga-Valka and Ural Yekaterinburg in Russia.

Brown joined Giessen 46ers of the German Basketball Bundesliga for the 2019–20 season. He averaged 13.3 points, 2.3 rebounds and 5.1 assists per game.

In 2020, Brown briefly joined the London Lions, including an appearance in Basketball Champions League qualifying, before moving to French club Denain ASC Voltaire for the remainder of the 2020–21 season. With Denain, he averaged 13.8 points, 3.0 rebounds, 4.7 assists and 1.2 steals per game.

=== BG Göttingen (2021–2022) ===
Brown returned to Germany for the 2021–22 season and joined BG Göttingen. He appeared in 33 league games, averaging 12.7 points and 4.3 assists per game.

=== Fos Provence Basket (2022–2023) ===
On June 26, 2022, Brown signed with Fos Provence Basket of the French LNB Pro A. In 29 league games during the 2022–23 season, he averaged 9.4 points, 1.9 rebounds and 4.0 assists per game.

=== Spójnia Stargard (2023–2024) ===
Brown joined Polish club Spójnia Stargard for the 2023–24 season. He became one of the team's main playmakers, averaging 13.6 points, 3.2 rebounds and 5.2 assists per game in the Polish league.

Brown also played six games in the 2023–24 FIBA Europe Cup, averaging 9.7 points and 5.0 assists per game. Spójnia finished fourth in the Polish league.

=== Nymburk (2024–2025) ===
On August 2, 2024, Brown signed with Czech champions ERA Nymburk.

During the 2024–25 season, Brown helped Nymburk win the Czech NBL championship. He appeared in 46 domestic league games, averaging 10.8 points, 2.6 rebounds and 5.8 assists per game.

Nymburk also won both the Czech Cup and the Czechoslovak Cup during the season.

In the 2024–25 Basketball Champions League, Brown played 14 games in the main competition and averaged 12.2 points, 2.4 rebounds and 5.1 assists per game. He had previously appeared in two qualification games, averaging 7.5 points, 3.5 rebounds and 7.0 assists. Nymburk reached the Basketball Champions League quarter-finals before being eliminated by Galatasaray.

=== PAOK Thessaloniki (2025) ===
On July 6, 2025, Brown signed with PAOK Thessaloniki for the 2025–26 season. He immediately assumed a prominent playmaking role in the team's backcourt.

Brown appeared in two Basketball Champions League qualification games for PAOK, averaging 8.5 points and 4.0 assists per game. Following PAOK's move into the 2025–26 FIBA Europe Cup, he appeared in six games in the competition and averaged 12.0 points, 2.3 rebounds and 6.8 assists per game.

In the Greek Basketball League, Brown played eight games for PAOK, averaging 12.0 points, 3.5 rebounds and 4.9 assists per game. On November 9, 2025, he scored the decisive basket in a 78–76 road victory over AEK Athens.

In December, Brown suffered a left ankle injury which kept him out of several games.

On December 22, 2025, PAOK and Brown mutually agreed to terminate his contract.

=== Pallacanestro Reggiana (2025–2026) ===
Following his departure from PAOK, Brown joined Pallacanestro Reggiana for the remainder of the 2025–26 season. Head coach Dimitris Priftis described Brown as a guard capable of controlling the ball, reading the game and creating opportunities for both himself and his teammates.

Brown became part of Reggiana's backcourt rotation during the second half of the season. In 11 Lega Basket Serie A appearances, he averaged 9.2 points, 2.5 rebounds and 2.8 assists in 21.9 minutes per game.

He also appeared in six 2025–26 FIBA Europe Cup games for Reggiana, averaging 8.0 points, 2.3 rebounds and 4.2 assists per game. Reggiana reached the quarter-finals of the competition.

Following the conclusion of the 2025–26 season, Brown became a free agent. He was among the foreign players from Reggiana's 2025–26 roster reported as being out of contract, and he was not retained for the club's 2026–27 roster.
