= Petar Kovačević (basketball player) =

Serbian basketball player (born 2002)

Bosna
- Position: Power forward
- League: Bosnian League; ABA League

Personal information
- Born: 30 October 2002 (age 24) Belgrade, Serbia
- Listed height: 2.05 m (6 ft 9 in)

Career information
- Playing career: 2022–present

Career history
- 2022–2024: Mega MIS
- 2024–: Bosna BH Telecom

Career highlights
- ABA League 2 champion (2024–25); MVP of 6th round, Top 8 phase ABA League 2 (April 2025); Champion Cup of Bosnia and Herzegovina (2025/2026); Championship of Bosnia and Herzegovina (2025/2026); MVP Player off final series (2025/2026)

Petar Kovačević (Serbian Cyrillic: Петар Ковачевић; born 30 October 2002 in Belgrade, Serbia) is a Serbian professional basketball player who plays as a power forward for KK Bosna BH Telecom in the Bosnian League, ABA League and FIBA Europe Cup. He previously represented Mega Basket in the Serbian Basketball League and ABA League.

== Early life and youth career ==
Kovačević was born in Belgrade on 30 October 2002 and developed through the youth ranks of Serbian clubs including KK Mega Basket and OKK Beograd. He was widely regarded among the top young talents of his generation in Serbia, featuring in the junior ABA League and U19 European competitions.

== Professional career ==
=== Mega Basket (2022-2024) ===
Kovačević joined Mega Basket in 2022 after strong performances with OKK Beograd. During his time in the ABA League, he averaged 2.4 points and 1.9 rebounds in limited minutes, and was considered a promising prospect.

=== KK Bosna BH Telecom (2024-present) ===
In July 2024, Kovačević moved to Bosna in Sarajevo, becoming a key player in their successful ABA League 2 campaign. He averaged 11.7 points and 4.6 rebounds per game in ABA 2 and 10.3 points and 3.7 rebounds per game in the Bosnian League, shooting over 65% from two-point range. He was instrumental in Bosna claiming the 2024–25 ABA League 2 championship, including a standout performance in the final.

== Player profile ==
Standing at 203 cm (6 ft 8 in) and weighing around 102 kg, Kovačević primarily plays as a power forward, capable of stretching the floor and rebounding effectively. He re-signed with Bosna for the following season after his breakout campaign.
