= Savo Drezgić =

Serbian basketball player (born 2006)

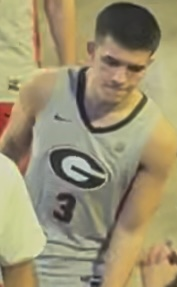
- Drezgić with Georgia Bulldogs in 2025

Free agent
- Position: Point guard / shooting guard

Personal information
- Born: August 11, 2006 (age 20) Belgrade, Serbia
- Listed height: 1.94 m (6 ft 4 in)
- Listed weight: 86 kg (190 lb)

Career information
- High school: DME Academy (Daytona Beach, Florida)
- College: Georgia (2024–2025)

Career history
- 2023–2024: Partizan
- 2025–2026: Mega

Career highlights
- ABA League champion (2023)
Medals
Men's basketball
Representing Serbia
FIBA U18 EuroBasket
Silver medal – second place	2024 Finland	Team

Savo Drezgić (Serbian Cyrillic: Саво Дрезгић; born 11 August 2006) is a Serbian basketball player who last played for Mega Superbet of the Serbian SuperLeague and the ABA League. He previously played for the Georgia Bulldogs of the Southeastern Conference. He also represents the Serbia national team.

== Early career ==
He played for all youth selections of Partizan.

== Professional career ==
On 15 February 2023, Drezgić made his professional debut for Partizan in a Radivoj Korać Cup match against Spartak Subotica. Drezgić scored two points. On 22 May 2023, he made his ABA League debut in a playoff game against SC Derby, scoring two points. Partizan ended the 2022–23 season by lifting the ABA League championship trophy, after 3–2 score against Crvena zvezda in the Finals series

== National team career ==
He represented the Serbia national under-16 basketball team at the 2022 FIBA U16 European Championship. He averaged 13.6 points, 4.4 rebounds and 3,1 assists per game.

== Career statistics ==
Legend
GP	Games played	GS	Games started	MPG	Minutes per game
FG%	Field-goal percentage	3P%	3-point field-goal percentage	FT%	Free-throw percentage
RPG	Rebounds per game	APG	Assists per game	SPG	Steals per game
BPG	Blocks per game	PPG	Points per game	PIR	Performance index rating
**Bold**	Career high

=== Domestic leagues ===
Year	Team	League	GP	MPG	FG%	3P%	FT%	RPG	APG	SPG	BPG	PPG
2022–23	(Serbia) Partizan	ABA	3	3.0	.000	.000	1.000	1.0	.7	—	—	1.3
2023–24	(Serbia) Partizan	KLS	1	7.0	1.000	—	.500	2.0	1.0	—	—	3.0
2023–24	(Serbia) Partizan	ABA	3	6.8	.400	.500	.750	.3	1.0	—	—	2.7
