= Dario Drežnjak =

Croatian professional basketball player

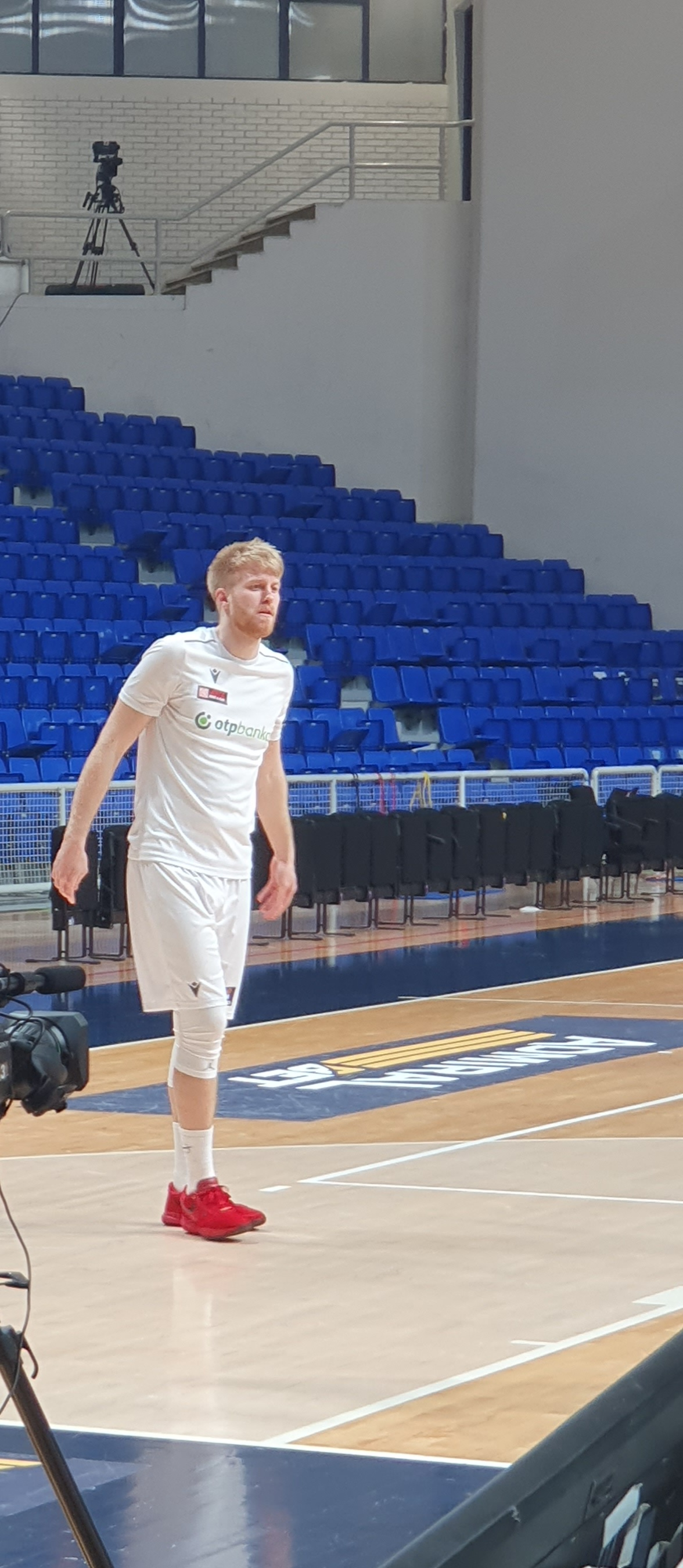
- Drežnjak in 2023

No. 7 – Zadar
- Position: Forward
- League: Croatian League; ABA League

Personal information
- Born: 24 March 1998 (age 28) Mostar, Bosnia and Herzegovina
- Listed height: 2.04 m (6 ft 8 in)

Career information
- NBA draft: 2020: undrafted
- Playing career: 2016–present

Career history
- 2016–2021: Široki
- 2021–2024: Zadar
- 2024: GeVi Napoli
- 2024–2025: Vanoli Cremona
- 2025: Keravnos
- 2025: Río Breogán
- 2025–2026: Split
- 2026–present: Zadar

Career highlights
- 2× Bosnian League champion (2019, 2021); 2× Croatian League champion (2023, 2024); 2× Croatian Cup winner (2024, 2026)

Dario Drežnjak (born March 24, 1998) is a Croatian professional basketball player for Zadar of the Croatian League and the ABA League. Standing at 2.04 m, he plays at the forward position.

== Professional career ==
Drežnjak started playing basketball in seventh grade of elementary school. Before playing basketball, he trained karate.

Drežnjak started his professional career in Široki, the same club he started playing basketball as a youngster. After a successful season in the ABA League Second Division, in July 2021, Drežnjak signed with Zadar of the Croatian League and ABA League. After a bad start in Zadar, he started playing better in the second part of 2021–22 season. During the 2022–23 season, Drežnjak was the second best scorer in Zadar after Luka Božić. In July 2023, he renewed his contract with Zadar for another season.

On August 12, 2024, Drežnjak signed with GeVi Napoli of the Lega Basket Serie A (LBA).

On November 27, 2024, Drežnjak signed with Vanoli Cremona of the Lega Basket Serie A (LBA).

In March, 2025, Drežnjak signed with Keravnos of the Cypriot League.

On July 8, 2025, he signed with Rio Breogán of the Spanish Liga ACB.

== National team career ==
Drežnjak played for the Bosnia and Herzegovina national under-16 basketball team at the 2014 FIBA Europe Under-16 Championship. He was called up for the Bosnia and Herzegovina senior national basketball team but declined, wanting to play for Croatia. He played for Croatia at the EuroBasket 2025 qualification games.

== Personal life ==
Dario's younger brother Mateo (born 1999) is also a professional basketball player and has played with his brother in Široki as well as the Croatia national basketball team.
