= Mateo Drežnjak =

Croatian professional basketball player

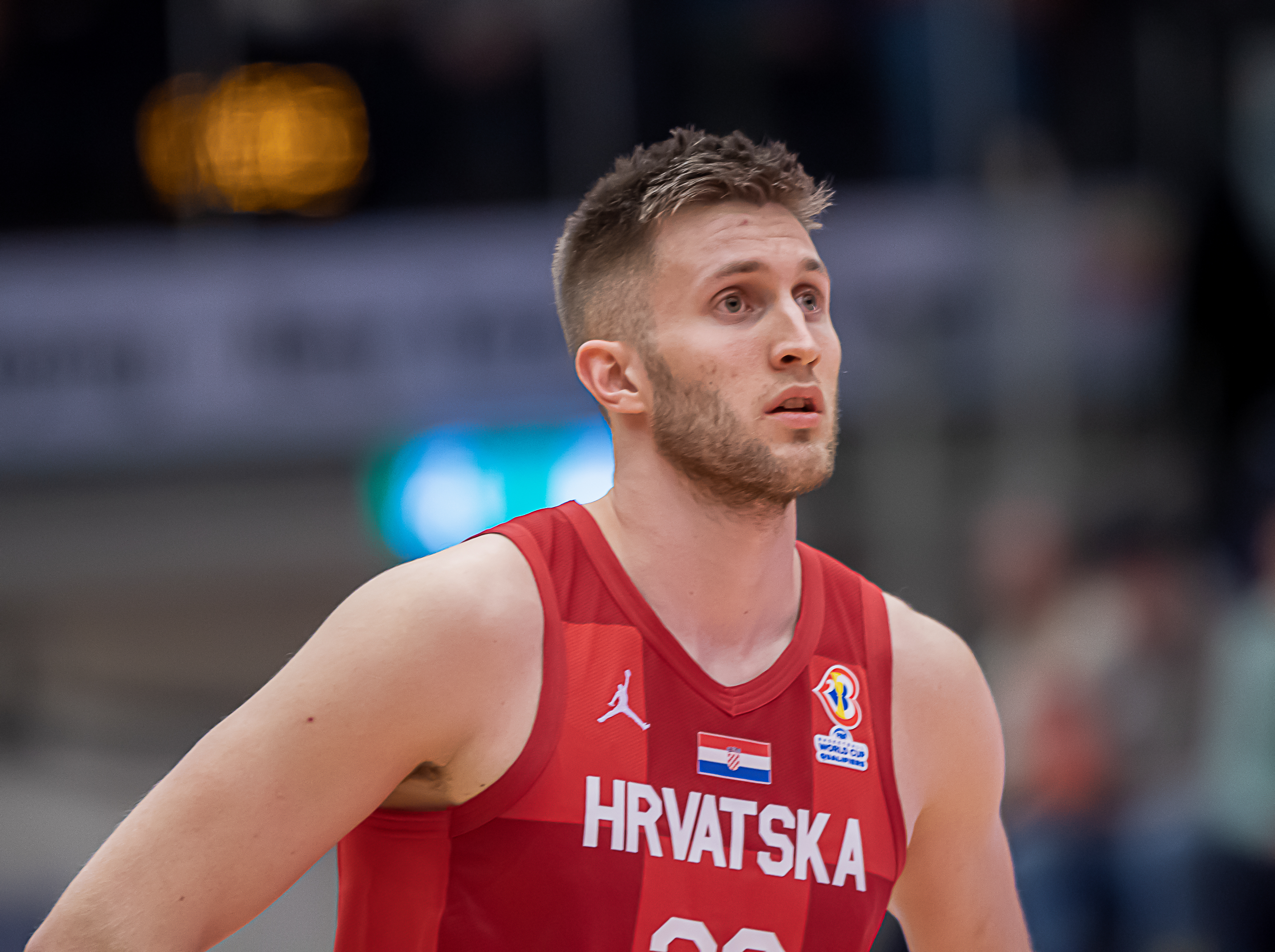
- Drežnjak in 2022

No. 23 – Slovan Bratislava
- Position: Shooting guard
- League: Slovak Basketball League; ABA League

Personal information
- Born: 8 March 1999 (age 27) Mostar, Bosnia and Herzegovina
- Listed height: 1.96 m (6 ft 5 in)
- Listed weight: 91 kg (201 lb)

Career information
- NBA draft: 2021: undrafted
- Playing career: 2015–present

Career history
- 2015–2020: Široki
- 2020–2022: Cibona
- 2022–2024: Studentski centar
- 2024–2025: Budućnost
- 2025–2026: Studentski centar
- 2026–present: Slovan Bratislava

Career highlights
- Bosnian League champion (2019); Croatian League champion (2022); Croatian Cup winner (2022); ABA League Supercup winner (2023); 2× Montenegrin Cup winner (2024, 2025); Montenegrin League champion (2025)
Medals
Men's basketball
Representing Croatia
FIBA Europe Under-18 Championship Division B
Gold medal – first place	2017 Estonia	National U-18 Team
FIBA Europe Under-20 Championship
Silver medal – second place	2018 Germany	National U-20 Team

Mateo Drežnjak (born March 8, 1999) is a Croatian professional basketball player for Slovan Bratislava of the Slovak Basketball League and the ABA League. Standing at 1.95 m, he plays at the shooting guard position.

== Professional career ==
Drežnjak started his professional career in Široki. At the age of 20 he was one of the leaders of the team playing in the Bosnian League and the ABA League Second Division.

In June 2020, Drežnjak moved to Cibona of the Croatian League and the ABA League, signing a four-year contract.

On 7 July 2022, Drežnjak signed a one-year deal with SC Derby of the Prva A Liga and the ABA League.

== National team career ==
Drežnjak played for the Croatian national basketball team youth selections. He was part of the teams that were ninth at the 2015 FIBA Europe Under-16 Championship and won the gold medal at the 2017 FIBA U18 European Championship Division B.

Drežnjak was part for the Croatia national B team at the 2019 NBA Summer League and 2019 FIBA Stanković Continental Champions' Cup.

Drežnjak debuted for the Croatian A team at the EuroBasket 2022 qualification. In the first two games played against Sweden and Netherlands in February 2020, he was the top scorer of the team.

In February 2020, FIBA named Drežnjak one of the 10 most promising European talents.

== Personal life ==
Drežnjak trained karate for six years then turned to basketball following his brother older brother Dario. Dario (born 1998) is also a professional basketball player and has played for the Bosnia and herzegovina national basketball team youth selections and the Croatia national B team. Dario and Mateo had played together for Široki.
