= KK Crvena zvezda in the ABA League =

KK Crvena zvezda in the ABA League shows records and statistics of Serbian men's professional basketball club Crvena zvezda in the ABA League competition system. The ABA League, commonly known as the Adriatic League, is a regional men's professional basketball league competition between men's teams from six countries: Bosnia and Herzegovina, Croatia, Montenegro, North Macedonia, Serbia and Slovenia. Crvena zvezda made the league debut in 2002, in the second season. The club won six League Championships and one Super Cup tournament.

== Overview ==
Note: Statistics are correct through the end of the 2025–26 season.

Competition	Record							
Competition	Pld	W	D	L	PF	PA	PD	Win %
Regular season	613	450	0	163	51,158	45,925	+5233	73.41
Postseason	89	56	0	33	7,296	6,820	+476	62.92
Super Cup	4	3	0	1	336	291	+45	75.00
Total	706	509	0	197	58,790	53,036	+5754	72.10

Last updated: June 20, 2026
Source: Competitions

== Competitions ==
=== League ===
==== Standings ====
Season	Regular season								Postseason							
Season	G	W	L	W–L%	PF	PA	PD	Finish	G	W	L	W–L%	PF	PA	PD	Result
2001–02	Did not participate								Did not participate							
2002–03	22	17	5	.773	1,828	1,648	+180	1st	1	0	1	.000	77	78	−1	Lost in Semifinals
2003–04	26	18	8	.692	2,250	2,168	+82	4th	1	0	1	.000	110	113	−3	Lost in Semifinals
2004–05	30	20	10	.667	2,489	2,260	+229	3rd	2	1	1	.500	158	158	±0	Lost in Semifinals
2005–06	26	19	7	.731	2,083	1,886	+197	2nd	2	1	1	.500	164	177	−13	Lost in Semifinals
2006–07	26	15	11	.577	2,325	2,212	+113	6th	Did not qualify							
2007–08	26	16	10	.615	2,275	2,212	+63	4th	3	1	2	.333	227	272	−45	Lost in Quarterfinals
2008–09	26	19	7	.731	2,010	1,913	+97	4th	1	0	1	.000	58	64	−6	Lost in Semifinals
2009–10	26	11	15	.423	2,069	2,012	+57	9th	Did not qualify							
2010–11	26	8	18	.308	1,994	2,135	−141	13th	Did not qualify							
2011–12	26	11	15	.423	2,074	2,091	−17	10th	Did not qualify							
2012–13	26	18	8	.692	2,097	1,889	+208	2nd	2	1	1	.500	142	149	−7	Lost in Finals
2013–14	26	22	4	.846	2,017	1,725	+292	1st	1	0	1	.000	70	75	−5	Lost in Semifinals
2014–15	26	24	2	.923	2,147	1,790	+357	1st	8	6	2	.750	605	567	+38	Won Championship
2015–16	26	20	6	.769	2,046	1,800	+246	2nd	5	5	0	1.000	419	364	+55	Won Championship
2016–17	26	25	1	.962	2,226	1,762	+464	1st	6	5	1	.833	463	389	+74	Won Championship
2017–18	22	19	3	.864	1,955	1,679	+276	1st	7	3	4	.429	558	514	+44	Lost in Finals
2018–19	22	21	1	.955	1,875	1,517	+358	1st	8	5	3	.625	704	593	+111	Won Championship
2019–20	21	14	7	.667	1,758	1,562	+196	3rd	Canceled due to the COVID-19 pandemic							
2020–21	26	23	3	.885	2,064	1,694	+370	1st	8	5	3	.625	605	568	+37	Won Championship
2021–22	26	24	2	.923	2,140	1,819	+321	1st	8	5	3	.625	667	664	+3	Won Championship
2022–23	26	23	3	.885	2,262	1,890	+372	2nd	9	6	3	.667	766	652	+114	Lost in Finals
2023–24	26	22	4	.846	2,310	1,877	+433	1st	7	7	0	1.000	619	531	+88	Won Championship
2024–25	30	23	7	.767	2,672	2,365	+307	4th	5	3	2	.600	430	433	−3	Lost in Semifinals
2025–26	24	18	6	.750	2,192	2,019	+173	3rd	5	2	3	.400	454	459	−5	Lost in Semifinals
2026–27									TBD							
Totals	613	450	163	.734	51,158	45,925	+5,233		89	56	33	.629	7,296	6,820	+476	

==== Positions by year ====
#	03	04	05	06	07	08	09	10	11	12	13	14	15	16	17	18	19	20	21	22
1													1	1	1		1		1	1
2											2					2				
3	3		3	3								3						3		
4		4					4													
5						5														
6					6															
7																				
8																				
9								9												
10										10										
11																				
12																				
13									13											
14																				
15																				
16																				

=== Super Cup ===
Season	G	W	L	W–L%	PF	PA	PD	Finish
2017	Withdrawn							
2018	3	3	0	1.000	254	203	+51	Won Tournament
2019	1	0	1	.000	82	88	–6	Lost in quarterfinals
2020	Canceled due to the COVID-19 pandemic							
2021; 2022	Not held							
2023	Withdrawn							
Total	4	3	1	.750	336	291	+45	

== Individual awards ==
=== League ===
Regular Season MVP
Number	Player	Season(s)	Ref.
1	(Serbia) Milan Gurović	2006–07	
1	(Serbia) Tadija Dragićević	2007–08	
1	(Serbia) Nikola Kalinić	2021–22	

Finals MVP
Number	Player	Season(s)	Ref.
1	(Serbia) Raško Katić	2013	
1	(Serbia) Boban Marjanović	2015	
1	(Serbia) Stefan Jović	2016	
1	(United States) Charles Jenkins	2017	
1	(United States) Billy Baron	2019	
1	(Cameroon) Landry Nnoko	2021	
1	(Serbia) Ognjen Dobrić	2022	

Top Scorer
Number	Player	Season(s)	Ref.
1	(Serbia and Montenegro) Igor Rakočević	2003–04	
1	(Serbia) Milan Gurović	2006–07	
1	(Serbia) Tadija Dragićević	2007–08	

Coach of the Season
Number	Player	Season(s)	Ref.
2	(Montenegro) Dejan Radonjić	2013–14, 2014–15	

Best Defender
Number	Player	Season(s)	Ref.
2	(Serbia) Branko Lazić	2020–21, 2021–22	

MVP of the Month
Number	Player	Month(s)	Ref.
1	(Serbia) Boban Marjanović	Nov 2014	
1	(Germany) Maik Zirbes	Feb 2016	
1	(Montenegro) Milko Bjelica	Nov 2017	
1	(Argentina) Luca Vildoza	Oct 2022	
1	(Argentina) Facundo Campazzo	Jan 2023	
1	(Serbia) Nemanja Nedović	Feb 2023	

Ideal Five
Number	Player	Season(s)	Ref.
2	(Serbia) Boban Marjanović	2013–14, 2014–15	
1
1	(United States) DeMarcus Nelson	2013–14	
1	(Germany) Maik Zirbes	2015–16	
1	(Serbia) Stefan Jović	2016–17	
1	(United States) Charles Jenkins	2016–17	
1	(Serbia) Marko Simonović	2016–17	
1	(Montenegro) Taylor Rochestie	2017–18	
1	(United States) Joe Ragland	2018–19	
1	(Greece) Stratos Perperoglou	2018–19	
1	(United States) Jordan Loyd	2020–21	
1	(Serbia) Nikola Kalinić	2021–22	

=== Super Cup ===
MVP
Number	Player	Season(s)	Ref.
1	(Senegal) Mouhammad Faye	2018	

=== All-time ideal five ===
In April 2020, the ABA League fans selected the Crvena zvezda all-time ideal team based on players who played for the club in the league.

Position	Player	ABA Tenure
PG	(Serbia) Igor Rakočević	2003–2004, 2012–2013
SG	(Serbia) Milan Gurović	2005–2007
SF	(United States) Quincy Miller	2015–2016
PF	(Serbia) Nemanja Bjelica	2008–2010
C	(Serbia) Boban Marjanović	2013–2015
