= ABA League Player of the Month Award =

Basketball award

The ABA League Player of the Month Award is a basketball award that recognizes the best ABA League player for each month of a season.

== Winners ==
Season	Month	Year	Player	Team	Ref
2014–15	October	2014	(Serbia) Nenad Miljenović	(Serbia) Mega Leks	
2014–15	November	2014	(Serbia) Boban Marjanović	(Serbia) Crvena zvezda	
2014–15	December	2014	(Croatia) Josip Sobin	(Croatia) Zadar	
2014–15	January	2015	(Serbia) Milan Mačvan	(Serbia) Partizan	
2014–15	February	2015	(Serbia) Nikola Jokić	(Serbia) Mega Leks	
2014–15	March	2015	(Montenegro) Boris Savović	(Montenegro) Budućnost	
2015–16	October	2015	(Montenegro) Suad Šehović	(Montenegro) Budućnost	
2015–16	November	2015	(Croatia) Miro Bilan	(Croatia) Cedevita	
2015–16	December	2015	(Croatia) Miro Bilan (2)	(Croatia) Cedevita	
2015–16	January	2016	(Serbia) Tadija Dragićević	(Montenegro) Budućnost	
2015–16	February	2016	(Germany) Maik Zirbes	(Serbia) Crvena zvezda	
2016–17	October	2016	(Croatia) Ante Žižić	(Croatia) Cibona	
2016–17	November	2016	(Croatia) Luka Babić	(Croatia) Cedevita	
2016–17	December	2016	(Serbia) Nikola Janković	(Slovenia) Union Olimpija	
2016–17	January	2017	(Serbia) Filip Čović	(Serbia) FMP	
2016–17	February	2017	(Serbia) Stefan Birčević	(Serbia) Partizan	
2017–18	October	2017	(United States) Patrick Miller	(Serbia) Partizan	
2017–18	November	2017	(Montenegro) Milko Bjelica	(Serbia) Crvena zvezda	
2017–18	December	2017	(United States) Josh Bostic	(Croatia) Zadar	
2017–18	January	2018	(Serbia) Novica Veličković	(Serbia) Partizan	
2017–18	February	2018	(Serbia) Uroš Luković	(Montenegro) Mornar	
2018–19	October	2018	(Georgia (country)) Goga Bitadze	(Serbia) Mega Bemax	
2018–19	November	2018	(Serbia) Dragan Apić	(Serbia) FMP	
2018–19	December	2018	(Serbia) Dragan Apić (2)	(Serbia) FMP	
2018–19	January	2019	(United States) Marcus Paige	(Serbia) Partizan	
2018–19	February	2019	(Serbia) Stefan Pot	(Serbia) FMP	
2019–20	October	2019	(Serbia) Aleksa Radanov	(Serbia) FMP	
2019–20	November	2019	(Croatia) Filip Bundović	(Croatia) Cibona	
2019–20	December	2019	(United States) Rashawn Thomas	(Serbia) Partizan	
2019–20	January	2020	(United States) Justin Cobbs	(Montenegro) Budućnost	
2019–20	February	2020	(Serbia) Uroš Luković (2)	(Montenegro) Mornar	
2020–21	October	2020	(Serbia) Filip Petrušev	(Serbia) Mega Soccerbet	
2020–21	November	2020	(Slovenia) Jaka Blažič	(Slovenia) Cedevita Olimpija	
2020–21	December	2020	(Serbia) Filip Petrušev (2)	(Serbia) Mega Soccerbet	
2020–21	January	2021	(Slovenia) Jaka Blažič (2)	(Slovenia) Cedevita Olimpija	
2020–21	February	2021	(United States) Chinanu Onuaku	(Croatia) Zadar	
2020–21	March	2021	(Montenegro) Nikola Ivanović	(Montenegro) Budućnost	
2020–21	April	2021	(United States) Rashawn Thomas	(Serbia) Partizan	
2021–22	October	2021	(United States) Bryce Jones	(Serbia) FMP	
2021–22	November	2021	(Serbia) Dalibor Ilić	(Bosnia and Herzegovina) Igokea	
2021–22	December	2021	(Montenegro) Justin Cobbs	(Montenegro) Budućnost	
2021–22	January	2022	(United States) Willie Reed	(Montenegro) Budućnost	
2021–22	February	2022	(Bosnia and Herzegovina) Amar Gegić	(Croatia) Cibona	
2021–22	March	2022	(Slovenia) Jaka Blažič (3)	(Slovenia) Cedevita Olimpija	
2022–23	October	2022	(Argentina) Luca Vildoza	(Serbia) Crvena zvezda	
2022–23	November	2022	(Lithuania) Paulius Valinskas	(Serbia) FMP Meridian	
2022–23	December	2022	(United States) Yogi Ferrell	(Slovenia) Cedevita Olimpija	
2022–23	January	2023	(Argentina) Facundo Campazzo	(Serbia) Crvena zvezda	
2022–23	February	2023	(Serbia) Nemanja Nedović	(Serbia) Crvena zvezda	
2022–23	March	2023	(Croatia) Matej Rudan	(Serbia) Mega MIS	
2023–24	October	2023	(Croatia) Luka Božić	(Croatia) Zadar	
2023–24	November	2023	(Croatia) Karlo Matković	(Slovenia) Cedevita Olimpija	
2023–24	December	2023	(Croatia) Luka Božić (2)	(Croatia) Zadar	
2023–24	January	2024	(United States) Shannon Shorter	(Croatia) Split	
2023–24	February	2024	(United States) Marcus Weathers	(Montenegro) Mornar Bar	
2023–24	March	2024	(Croatia) Luka Božić (3)	(Croatia) Zadar	
2024–25	September & October	2024	(Serbia) Bogoljub Marković	(Serbia) Mega MIS	
2024–25	November	2024	(United States) Rasir Bolton	(Serbia) Spartak Office Shoes	
2024–25	December	2024	(Bosnia and Herzegovina) Kenan Kamenjaš	(Montenegro) Budućnost VOLI	
2024–25	January	2025	(United States) Bryce Jones	(Bosnia and Herzegovina) Igokea m:tel	
2024–25	February	2025	(Croatia) Filip Bundović	(Croatia) Cibona	
2024–25	March	2025	(United States) Bryce Jones (2)	(Bosnia and Herzegovina) Igokea m:tel	
2024–25	April	2025	(United States) Bryce Jones (3)	(Bosnia and Herzegovina) Igokea m:tel	
2025–26	October	2025	(Slovenia) Gregor Glas	(Austria) Vienna	
2025–26	November	2025	(Serbia) Dušan Miletić	(Romania) U-BT Cluj-Napoca	
2025–26	December	2025	(United States) Duane Washington	(Serbia) Partizan Mozzart Bet	
2025–26	January & February	2026	(Serbia) Bogoljub Marković (2)	(Serbia) Mega Superbet	
2025–26	March	2026	(Serbia) Stefan Miljenović	(Serbia) Crvena zvezda Meridianbet	
2025–26	April	2026	(United States) Yogi Ferrell (2)	(Montenegro) Budućnost VOLI	

== Awards won by player's nationality ==
Country	Wins
Serbia	23
United States	18
Croatia	12
Montenegro	5
Slovenia	4
Argentina	2
Bosnia and Herzegovina	2
Germany	1
Georgia	1
Lithuania	1

== Awards won by club ==
Club	Wins
Budućnost	9
Mega	8
Partizan	8
Crvena zvezda	7
FMP	7
Zadar	6
Cedevita Olimpija	5
Cibona	4
Igokea	4
Cedevita	3
Mornar	3
Olimpija	1
Split	1
Spartak	1
U-BT Cluj-Napoca	1
Vienna	1

== See also ==
- ABA League MVP
- ABA League Finals MVP
- ABA League Top Scorer
- ABA League Top Prospect
- ABA League Ideal Starting Five
