= ABA League Finals MVP =

Basketball award in former Yugoslavia countries

The ABA League Finals MVP award, also known as the Adriatic League Finals MVP award (formerly the Final Four MVP), is an annual award that is given to the most valuable player of the finals of the European regional Adriatic ABA League, which is the top-tier level professional basketball league for countries of the former Yugoslavia. The award has been given since the 2001–02 ABA League season.

== Winners ==
Season	Player	Team	Ref.
2001–02	(Slovenia) Jure Zdovc	(Slovenia) Union Olimpija	
2002–03	(Croatia) Marko Popović	(Croatia) Zadar	
2003–04	(Serbia and Montenegro) Ognjen Aškrabić	(Serbia and Montenegro) FMP	
2004–05	(Serbia and Montenegro) Nebojša Bogavac	(Serbia and Montenegro) Hemofarm	
2005–06	(United States) Vonteego Cummings	(Serbia and Montenegro) Partizan	
2006–07	(United States) Vonteego Cummings (2×) (Serbia) Zoran Erceg	(Serbia) Partizan (Serbia) FMP	
2007–08	(Montenegro) Nikola Peković	(Serbia) Partizan	
2008–09	(Serbia) Novica Veličković	(Serbia) Partizan	
2009–10	(United States) Jamont Gordon	(Croatia) Cibona	
2010–11	(Australia) Nate Jawai	(Serbia) Partizan	
2011–12	(United States) Keith Langford	(Israel) Maccabi Tel Aviv	
2012–13	(Serbia) Raško Katić	(Serbia) Crvena zvezda	
2013–14	(Croatia) Dario Šarić	(Croatia) Cibona	
2014–15	(Serbia) Boban Marjanović	(Serbia) Crvena zvezda	
2015–16	(Serbia) Stefan Jović	(Serbia) Crvena zvezda	
2016–17	(United States) Charles Jenkins	(Serbia) Crvena zvezda	
2017–18	(Bosnia and Herzegovina) Nemanja Gordić	(Montenegro) Budućnost	
2018–19	(United States) Billy Baron	(Serbia) Crvena zvezda	
2019–20	Not awarded		
2020–21	(Cameroon) Landry Nnoko	(Serbia) Crvena zvezda	
2021–22	(Serbia) Ognjen Dobrić	(Serbia) Crvena zvezda	
2022–23	(United States) Kevin Punter	(Serbia) Partizan	
2023–24	(Brazil) Yago dos Santos	(Serbia) Crvena zvezda	
2024–25	(United States) Tyrique Jones	(Serbia) Partizan	

== See also ==
- ABA League MVP
- ABA League Top Scorer
- ABA League Top Prospect
- ABA League Ideal Starting Five
- Player of the Month
