= ABA League MVP =

ABA League award

- Sport: Basketball
- Competition: ABA League
- Awarded for: Best performing player in regular season of the ABA League
- Presented by: ABA League JTD

History
- First award: 2001–02
- Editions: 23
- First winner: Marino Baždarić
- Most wins: Dejan Milojević (3)
- Most recent: Bogoljub Marković

The ABA League Most Valuable Player Award (MVP) is an annual ABA League award given since the inaugural season to the best performing player of the regular season. The League is the top-tier regional men's professional basketball league that originally featured clubs from the former Yugoslavia (Bosnia and Herzegovina, Croatia, Montenegro, North Macedonia, Serbia and Slovenia).

Dejan Milojević won the award a record three times. Luka Žorić won it twice. Kenyan Weaks, Chester Mason, and David Simon of the United States and Goga Bitadze of Georgia are the only MVP winners outside the region. Dario Šarić in 2013–14 and Nikola Kalinić in 2021–22 are the only two players whose teams won championship that year. The award was not given in the 2019–20 season following season cancellation due to the COVID-19 pandemic.

== Winners ==
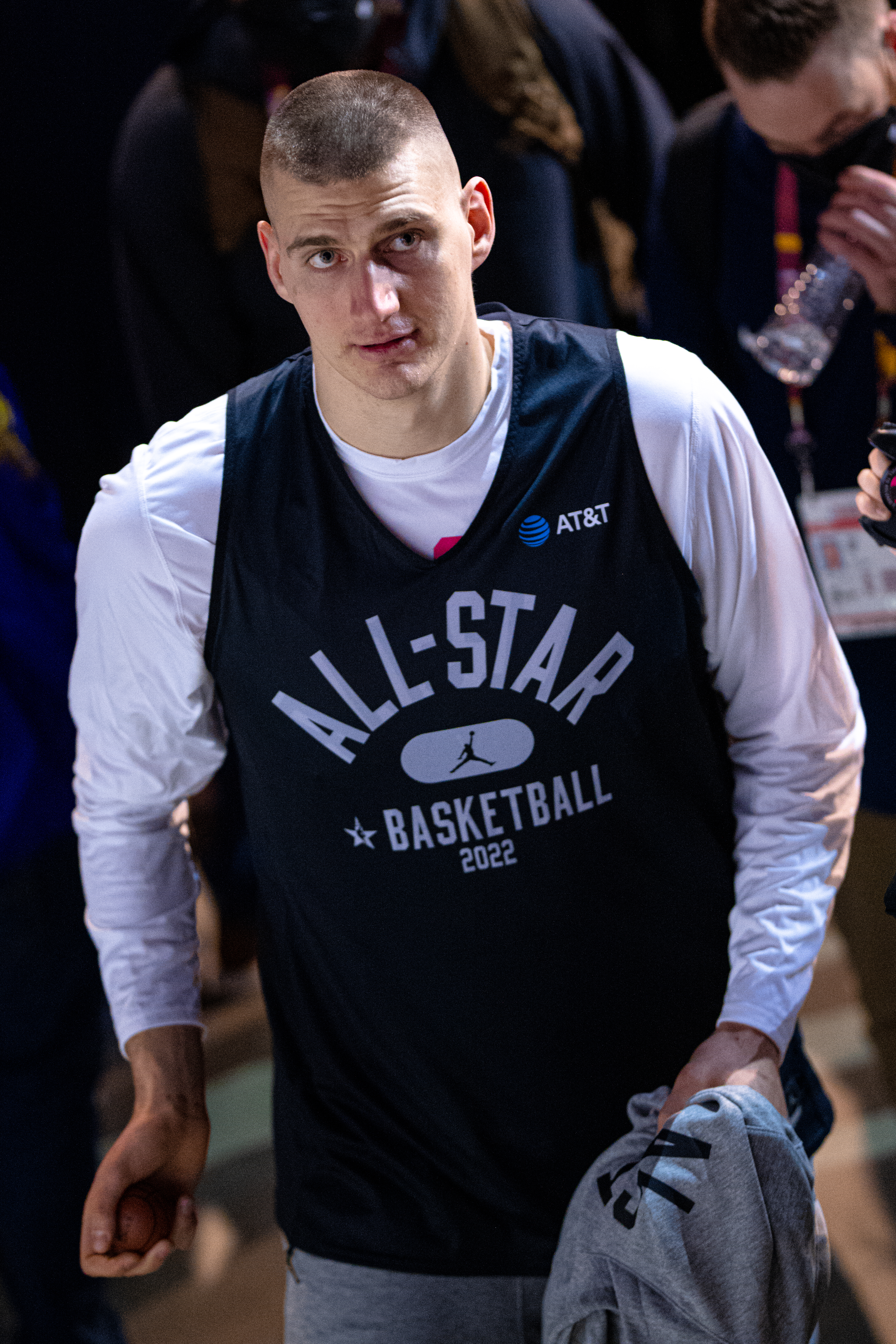
Three-time NBA MVP Nikola Jokić won the award in 2015.

^	Denotes player who is still active in the ABA League
†	Denotes player whose team won championship that year
Player (X)	Denotes the number of times the player had been named MVP at that time
Team (X)	Denotes the number of times a player from this team had won at that time

Season	MVP	Team	PIR	Ref.
2001–02	(Croatia) Marino Baždarić	(Croatia) Triglav osiguranje	17.64	
2002–03	(United States) Kenyan Weaks	(Slovenia) Pivovarna Laško	19.33	
2003–04	(Serbia and Montenegro) Dejan Milojević	(Serbia and Montenegro) Budućnost	29.35	
2004–05	(Serbia and Montenegro) Dejan Milojević (2)	(Serbia and Montenegro) Partizan	30.35	
2005–06	(Serbia and Montenegro) Dejan Milojević (3)	(Serbia and Montenegro) Partizan (2)	26.21	
2006–07	(Serbia) Milan Gurović	(Serbia) Crvena Zvezda	29.30	
2007–08	(Serbia) Tadija Dragićević	(Serbia) Crvena Zvezda (2)	21.93	
2008–09	(Croatia) Ante Tomić	(Croatia) Zagreb	22.42	
2009–10	(United States) Chester Mason	(Bosnia and Herzegovina) Široki	19.96	
2010–11	(Croatia) Luka Žorić	(Croatia) Zagreb (2)	23.62	
2011–12	(United States) David Simon	(Serbia) Radnički	22.27	
2012–13	(Slovenia) Aleksandar Ćapin	(Serbia) Radnički (2)	20.43	
2013–14 †	(Croatia) Dario Šarić	(Croatia) Cibona	21.15	
2014–15	(Serbia) Nikola Jokić	(Serbia) Mega Leks	21.96	
2015–16	(Croatia) Miro Bilan	(Croatia) Cedevita	20.81	
2016–17	(Serbia) Nikola Janković	(Slovenia) Union Olimpija	19.24	
2017–18	(Croatia) Luka Žorić (2)	(Croatia) Cibona (2)	23.24	
2018–19	(Georgia (country)) Goga Bitadze	(Montenegro) Budućnost (2)	19.95	
2019–20	Not awarded			
2020–21	(Serbia) Filip Petrušev ^	(Serbia) Mega Soccerbet (2)	27.95	
2021–22 †	(Serbia) Nikola Kalinić ^	(Serbia) Crvena zvezda mts (3)	12.96	
2022–23	(Croatia) Luka Božić	(Croatia) Zadar	32.56	
2023–24	(Croatia) Luka Božić (2)	(Croatia) Zadar (2)	29.16	
2024–25	(United States) McKinley Wright ^	(Montenegro) Budućnost VOLI (3)	16.00	
2025–26	(Serbia) Bogoljub Marković ^	(Serbia) Mega Superbet (3)	23.80	

== Multiple winners ==
Number	Coach	Winning team(s)	First	Last
3	(Serbia) Dejan Milojević	Budućnost, Partizan (2)	2004	2006
2	(Croatia) Luka Žorić	Zagreb, Cibona	2011	2018
2	(Croatia) Luka Božić	Zadar	2023	2024

== See also ==
- ABA League Finals MVP
- ABA League Top Scorer
- ABA League Top Prospect
- ABA League Ideal Starting Five
- Player of the Month
