= Hunter Hale =

American basketball player

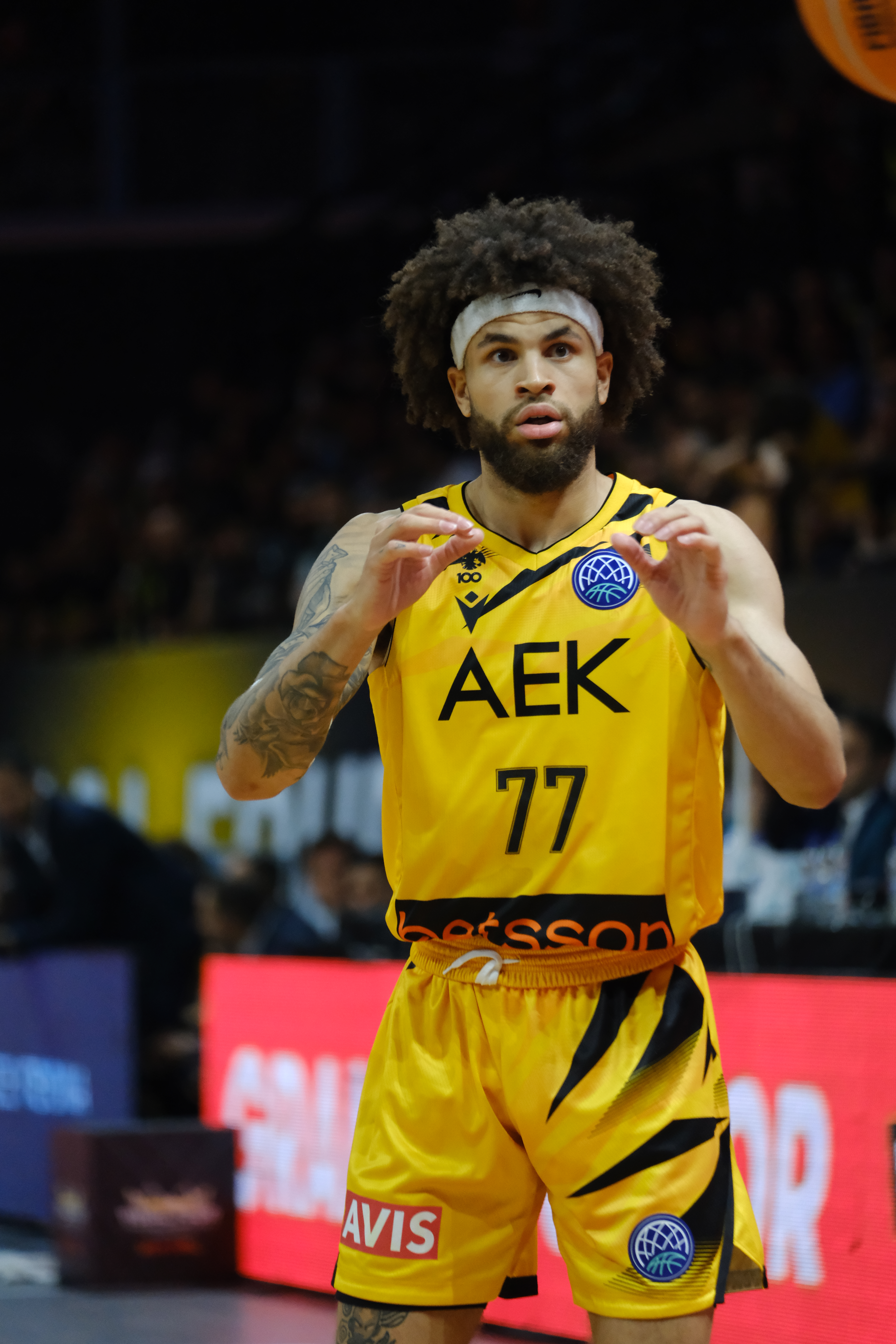
- Hale with AEK Athens in 2025

No. 12 – Openjobmetis Varese
- Position: Shooting guard
- League: LBA; Champions League

Personal information
- Born: June 25, 1997 (age 29) Kalamazoo, Michigan, U.S.
- Listed height: 6 ft 3 in (1.91 m)
- Listed weight: 185 lb (84 kg)

Career information
- High school: Kalamazoo Central (Kalamazoo, Michigan)
- College: Central Michigan (2015–2016); Grand Valley State (2017–2019); Winthrop (2019–2020)
- NBA draft: 2020: undrafted
- Playing career: 2020–present

Career history
- 2020–2021: Nelson Giants
- 2021–2023: Borac Čačak
- 2023–2024: Promitheas Patras
- 2024–2025: AEK Athens
- 2025–2026: Bahçeşehir Koleji
- 2026–present: Varese

Career highlights
- All-FIBA Champions League First Team (2025); All-FIBA Champions League Second Team (2024); ABA League Top Scorer (2023); Greek League Top Scorer (2024); New Zealand League Top Scorer (2021); All-New Zealand League Team (2021); Second-team All-GLIAC (2018); First-team All-GLIAC (2019); GLIAC tournament MVP (2019); Big South tournament MVP (2020)

Hunter Hale (born June 25, 1997) is an American professional basketball player for Pallacanestro Varese of the Lega Basket Serie A (LBA). He played college basketball for Central Michigan, Grand Valley State, and Winthrop.

== High school career ==
Hale attended Kalamazoo Central High School, where Isaiah Livers was a teammate of his. He trained in basketball with his uncle at the Bronson Athletic Club in Kalamazoo, Michigan, alongside older brothers H'Ian and Herschal. Hale was undersized and lightly recruited out of high school. He was nominated to the McDonald's All-American Game. Hale averaged 14 points, three rebounds and three assists per game as a senior, leading Kalamazoo Central to a 23–2 record and its second consecutive appearance in the Class A regional finals.

== College career ==
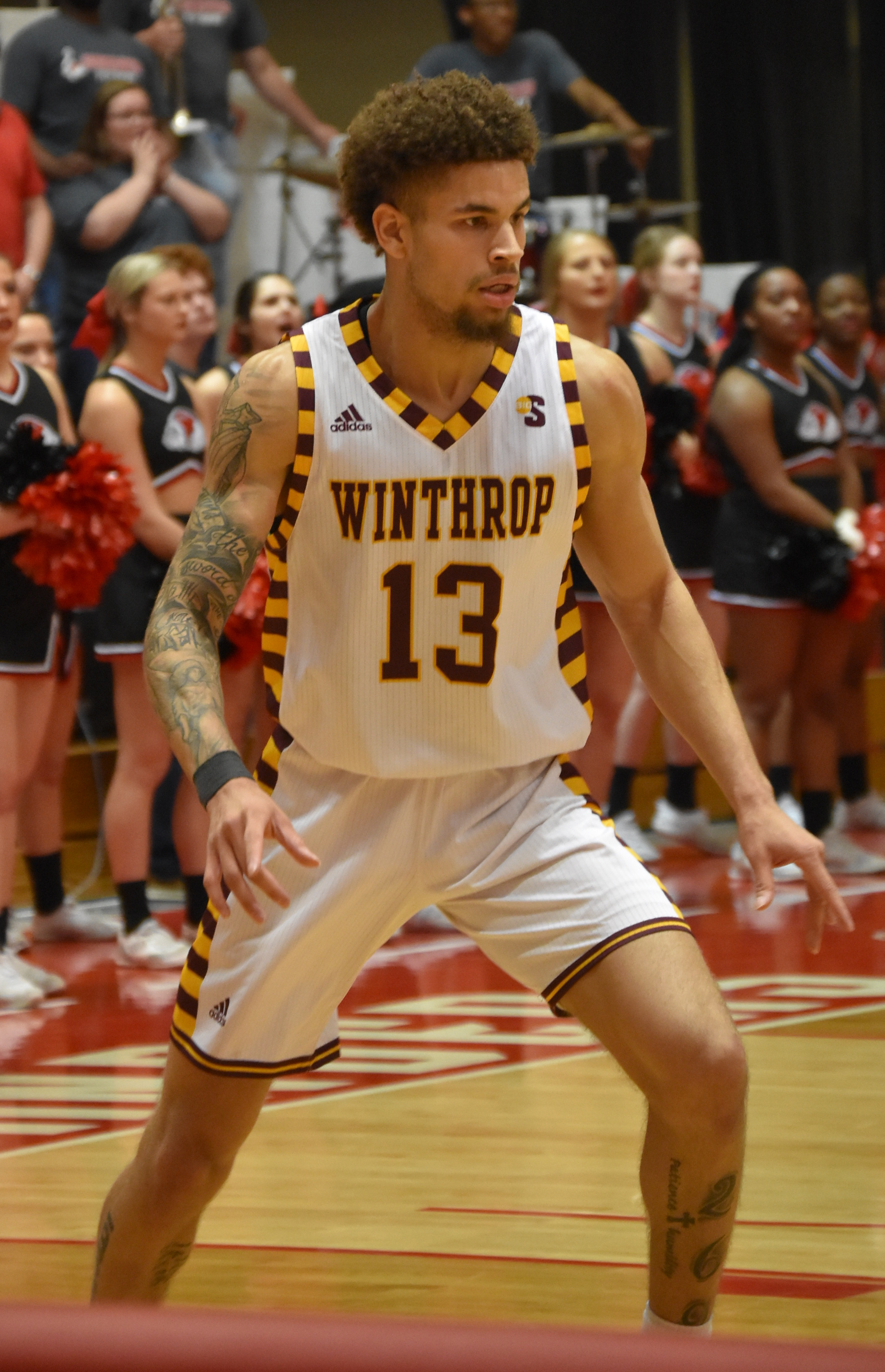
Hale with Winthrop in 2020

Hale walked on to the basketball team at Central Michigan. He scored a total of eight points in 11 games as a freshman. After Marcus Keene was recruited to the team, Hale redshirted his sophomore season and subsequently opted to transfer to Division II Grand Valley State. He was named to the Second Team All-GLIAC as a sophomore after averaging 12.9 points per game. As a junior, Hale helped the Lakers win a GLIAC championship and he was named tournament MVP. He averaged 17.0 points, 4.2 rebounds, 3.0 assists and 2.3 steals per game, earning First Team All-GLIAC honors. Hale was noticed by Pat Kelsey at Winthrop, and he decided to transfer to the Eagles for his final year of eligibility. Despite leading his conference in steals, he said he needed to improve his defense when coming to Division I. On January 2, 2020, he scored a career-high 29 points in a 91–67 win against Longwood. Hale led the team in scoring with 13.9 points per game, while also averaging 3.6 assists per game on a team that finished 24–10. He was named Big South Tournament MVP after leading Winthrop to a championship. However, the NCAA Tournament was cancelled due to the COVID-19 pandemic.

== Professional career ==
=== Nelson Giants (2021) ===
Hale went undrafted in the 2020 NBA draft. On February 11, 2021, Hale signed his first professional contract with the Nelson Giants of the New Zealand National Basketball League. On May 22, he scored 41 points in an overtime win against the Otago Nuggets. Hale led the league in scoring with 26.9 points per game, and was named to the NBL All-Star Five.

=== Borac Čačak (2021–2023) ===
On August 6, 2021, Hale signed with Borac Čačak of the Basketball League of Serbia and the ABA League. In 2021-22 season, Hale averaged 13.4 points, 4.2 rebounds and 3.1 assists over 26 ABA League regular season games. In his second season with the team, Hale was named the 2022–23 ABA League First Division Top Scorer with average of 22.3 points over 26 regular season games. In the relegation playoffs, Borac prevailed over Helios Suns with 2–1 record to stay in the league. Hale averaged 31 points and 5 assists on 52.6% shooting from the field in the series.

=== Promitheas Patras (2023–2024) ===
On July 24, 2023, Hale signed with Greek club Promitheas Patras. Over the season, Hale appeared in 20 league games with Promitheas, averaging 17.8 points, 4.2 rebounds and 4.1 assists on 40.6% shooting from the field. He won the Greek Basketball League Top Scorer award for the 2023–24 season and was named the All-Greek Basketball League Second Team.

=== AEK Athens (2024–2025) ===
On August 11, 2024, Hale signed with AEK Athens.

=== Bahçeşehir Koleji (2025–2026) ===
On June 25, 2025, Hale signed with Bahçeşehir Koleji of the Basketbol Süper Ligi (BSL).

=== Pallacanestro Varese (2026–present) ===
On June 26, 2026, he signed with Pallacanestro Varese of the Lega Basket Serie A (LBA).
