= Aleksandar Ćapin =

Slovenian basketball player (born 1982)

Personal information
- Born: October 6, 1982 (age 44) Sarajevo, SFR Yugoslavia
- Listed height: 1.86 m (6 ft 1 in)
- Listed weight: 84 kg (185 lb)

Career information
- NBA draft: 2004: undrafted
- Playing career: 2000–2017
- Position: Point guard
- Number: 6, 10, 12, 13, 24

Career history
- 2000–2003: Krka
- 2003–2004: Telekom Bonn
- 2004: Gravelines-Dunkerque
- 2004–2005: Panellinios
- 2005–2006: Viola Reggio Calabria
- 2006–2008: Cimberio Varese
- 2008: Panionios
- 2009: Lokomotiv Rostov / Kuban
- 2010–2011: Žalgiris
- 2011: Union Olimpija
- 2011–2012: Türk Telekom
- 2012–2013: Radnički Kragujevac
- 2013–2014: Budućnost Podgorica
- 2014–2015: Juvecaserta Basket
- 2015: MZT Skopje
- 2015–2016: Igokea
- 2016: Koroivos
- 2017: Sixt Primorska
- 2017: Dynamic

Career highlights
- LKL champion (2011); LKF Cup champion (2011); BBL champion (2010, 2011); Adriatic League MVP (2013); Adriatic League Top Scorer (2013); Adriatic League assists leader (2013); Macedonian League champion (2015); German League Best Young Player (2004)

Aleksandar Ćapin (born October 6, 1982) is a Serbian former professional basketball player.

== Early life ==
Growing up in Sarajevo, Ćapin took up association football in the FK Sarajevo youth system.

In spring 1992, with the outbreak of the Bosnian War, he fled his hometown via his parents arranging for the youngster and his sister to travel to Belgrade while the parents managed to join them several months later. In Belgrade, young Ćapin continued pursuing football within the FK Rad youth system.

In 1993, disappointed about being demoted to FK Rad's second team, the youngster abandoned football altogether and switched to basketball by starting to attend KK Partizan-organized practice sessions administered by the youth coach Dragiša Stamenković at the France Prešern Elementary School in the Belgrade neighbourhood of Miljakovac. Deemed talented enough, Ćapin was attached to KK Partizan's youth system proper where he was also coached by Stamenković for a few seasons before progressing up the age groups within the system. As he moved within the age groups, Ćapin would end up being coached by Igor Kokoškov, Milovan "Kime" Bogojević, Aleksandar Bućan, and Nenad Trajković.

Among the fellow prospects Ćapin shared rosters with at Partizan youth system were Marko Peković, Vule Avdalović, Aleksandar Gajić, and Mirko Kovač.

== Professional career ==
=== KK Krka ===
After spending years at the Partizan youth system, Ćapin made his full squad senior basketball debut with Krka in the 2000–01 season. He had previously arrived at the club via attending a club-organized summer 2000 junior camp where Krka wanted to identify and potentially sign new young players. Though having another year left as a junior at KK Partizan, the 17-year-old was not keen on being loaned out to the lower-league club KK Torlak that the Partizan management had just signed a deal with regarding loaning out its juniors to. Instead, teenage Ćapin decided to try out at Krka's camp in Slovenia where he ended up receiving a contract offer and signing.

Registered both with Krka's junior team and full squad, 18-year-old Ćapin mostly spent the season playing the Slovenian third-tier league with the club's juniors while also getting occasional minutes with the Aleš Pipan-coached full squad that played the Slovenian League and FIBA SuproLeague. In his debut season as a professional, though ineligible for the domestic league due to administrative issues, Ćapin saw some playing time in SuproLeague as the third option at the point-guard position behind Simon Petrov and Dražen Anzulović. The squad also featured shooting guard / small forward Saša Dončić, center Bennett Davison, veteran center Franjo Arapović, and power forward Dragiša Drobnjak.

After three years in Slovenia, Ćapin transferred to the German team Telekom Bonn in the 2003–04 season.

Between 2004 and 2008, Ćapin played for Gravelines-Dunkerque in France, for Panellinios and Panionios in Greece, and for Viola Reggio Calabria and Cimberio Varese in Italy.

In the summer of 2008, Ćapin signed a one-year contract with Azovmash from Ukraine. However, he got injured during a preseason game in September 2008, and he was released from the club without making a competitive debut.

In February 2009, he signed for the Russian team Lokomotiv Rostov, and he also stayed with the club after their relocating to Krasnodar.

After spending a year in Russia, Ćapin moved to Lithuania and signed with Žalgiris in January 2010.

Ćapin returned to Slovenia in the 2011–12 season and played for Union Olimpija. In December 2011, Ćapin moved to Turkey and joined Türk Telekom.

On October 10, 2012, Ćapin signed for the Serbian team Radnički Kragujevac. He showed great performances during the season and helped the team to reach the Adriatic League Final four. Ćapin also led the league in scoring and assists, and he earned the Adriatic League MVP award.

On August 9, 2013, Ćapin signed with Budućnost Podgorica. On December 10, 2014, he parted ways with Budućnost.

Nine days later, he signed with Juvecaserta Basket of Italy.

On March 5, 2015, he left Caserta and signed with the Macedonian club MZT Skopje for the rest of the season.

On August 12, 2015, he signed a one-year deal with Igokea. He debuted for the team in 67–56 loss to Cedevita in Round 1 of the ABA League; he led his team with 15 points, 5 assists and 2 rebounds. On January 5, 2016, he parted ways with Igokea.

On February 5, 2016, he signed with Koroivos for the rest of the 2015–16 Greek Basket League season.

On January 13, 2017, he signed with Slovenian club Primorska for the rest of the season.

On August 15, 2017, he signed with Serbian club Dynamic Belgrade. On December 30, 2017, he parted ways with Dynamic.

== National team career ==
Ćapin played with the senior Slovenian national team at the 2005 EuroBasket and the 2007 EuroBasket.

== Career statistics ==
Legend
GP	Games played	GS	Games started	MPG	Minutes per game
FG%	Field-goal percentage	3P%	3-point field-goal percentage	FT%	Free-throw percentage
RPG	Rebounds per game	APG	Assists per game	SPG	Steals per game
BPG	Blocks per game	PPG	Points per game	PIR	Performance index rating
**Bold**	Career high

=== EuroLeague ===
Year	Team	GP	GS	MPG	FG%	3P%	FT%	RPG	APG	SPG	BPG	PPG	PIR
2001–02	Krka	**12**	1	9.4	.500	.111	.500	0.5	0.8	0.3	—	1.9	1.2
2009–10	Žalgiris	7	0	18.9	.283	.240	.692	**3.3**	2.4	0.6	—	6.4	4.0
2010–11	Žalgiris	5	1	8.6	**.545**	**.500**	**1.000**	1.8	1.2	0.2	—	3.4	5.4
2011–12	Union Olimpija	8	**7**	**23.0**	.360	.321	.857	1.0	**2.9**	**0.8**	—	**7.1**	**7.6**
Career		32	9	14.7	.366	.266	.771	1.4	1.7	0.4	—	4.4	4.1
