= Luka Žorić =

Croatian basketball player (born 1984)

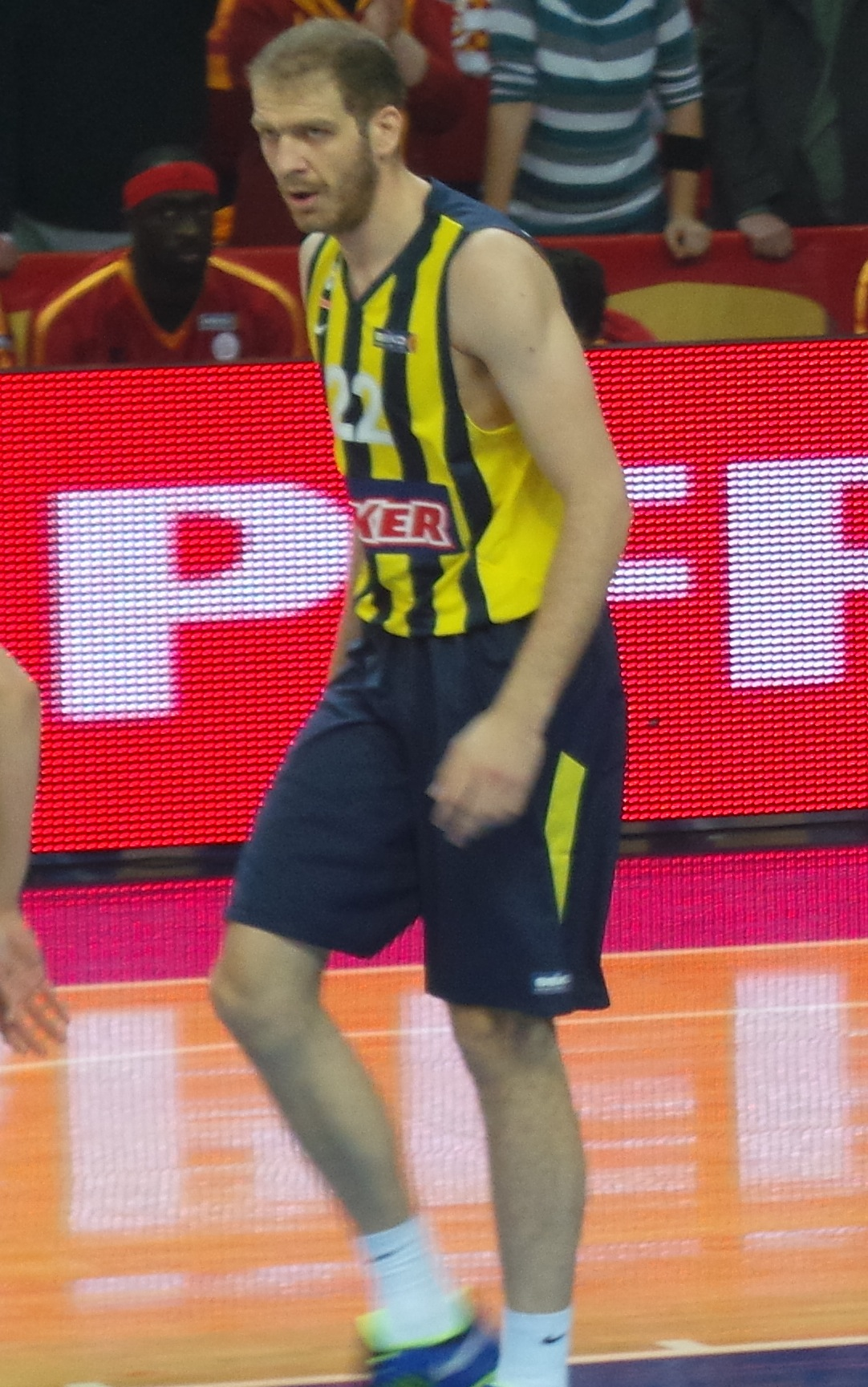
- Žorić with Fenerbahçe Ülker in December 2013

Personal information
- Born: November 5, 1984 (age 42) Zadar, SR Croatia, SFR Yugoslavia
- Listed height: 6 ft 11 in (2.11 m)
- Listed weight: 242 lb (110 kg)

Career information
- NBA draft: 2006: undrafted
- Playing career: 1999–2020
- Position: Center

Career history
- 1999–2001: Borik Puntamika
- 2001–2005: Cibona
- 2001–2002: → Zabok
- 2002–2003: → Karlovac
- 2003–2004: → Dubrava
- 2004–2005: → Braunschweig
- 2005: → Dubrovnik
- 2005–2006: Union Olimpija
- 2005–2006: → Postojnska jama
- 2006: Dubrovnik
- 2006–2007: Šibenka
- 2007–2008: Cibona
- 2008: Zabok
- 2008–2011: Zagreb
- 2011–2013: Unicaja Málaga
- 2013–2015: Fenerbahçe Ülker
- 2015–2016: Cedevita
- 2016: Sevilla
- 2017–2018: Cibona
- 2018–2019: Zadar
- 2019–2020: Samobor

Career highlights
- 2× Croatian League champion (2011, 2016); Turkish League champion (2014); Turkish Super Cup champion (2013); 4× Croatian Cup winner (2002, 2010, 2011, 2016); 2× Adriatic League MVP (2011, 2018); Adriatic League Top Scorer (2018)
Medals
Men's basketball
Representing Croatia
Mediterranean Games
Gold medal – first place	2009 Italy	Team

Luka Žorić (born November 5, 1984) is a Croatian former professional basketball player. Standing at 6 ft 11 in (2.11 m), he played at the center position.

== Professional career ==
In March 2011, Žorić received the award for Most Valuable Player of the NLB Adriatic League while playing for KK Zagreb.

On June 9, 2011, Žorić signed a three-year contract with the Spanish team Unicaja Málaga. On July 26, 2013, Žorić signed a three-year contract with Fenerbahçe Ülker. Unicaja received 850,000 euros of buyout from Fenerbahçe, as he was still under contract.

On July 28, 2015, Žorić returned to Croatia and signed with Cedevita for the 2015–16 season.

On August 10, 2016, he signed with Spanish club Baloncesto Sevilla. On November 22, 2016, he parted ways with Sevilla. On January 5, 2017, he returned to his former club Cibona for the rest of the season. On July 8, 2017, he re-signed with Cibona. On December 29, 2018, Žorić signed a contract with Zadar until the end of the season.

In September 2019, Žorić signed with Samobor playing in the second-tier Croatian First League.

== Career statistics ==
Legend
GP	Games played	GS	Games started	MPG	Minutes per game
FG%	Field-goal percentage	3P%	3-point field-goal percentage	FT%	Free-throw percentage
RPG	Rebounds per game	APG	Assists per game	SPG	Steals per game
BPG	Blocks per game	PPG	Points per game	PIR	Performance index rating
**Bold**	Career high

=== Euroleague ===
Year	Team	GP	GS	MPG	FG%	3P%	FT%	RPG	APG	SPG	BPG	PPG	PIR
2005–06	Union Olimpija	2	0	3.0	.000	—	—	.5	—	—	—	.0	-2.5
2007–08	Cibona	4	1	7.0	**.600**	—	—	.5	—	—	—	1.5	-.3
2011–12	Unicaja	16	14	**23.7**	.525	—	.683	**6.1**	**.8**	**.5**	.9	11.7	13.7
2012–13	Unicaja	**24**	**22**	23.4	.562	—	.758	5.3	**.8**	.3	**1.0**	**12.4**	**13.8**
2013–14	Fenerbahçe	**24**	7	18.9	.556	.000	.769	3.6	.2	.2	.6	8.3	7.0
2014–15	Fenerbahçe	23	1	13.0	.542	—	.682	2.9	.4	.1	.5	5.8	6.3
2015–16	Cedevita	16	0	13.0	.438	—	**.909**	2.1	.6	.3	.3	5.3	3.8
Career		109	45	17.7	.537	.000	.742	3.8	.5	.3	.6	8.3	8.4
