= Luka Božić =

Croatian basketball player (born 1996)

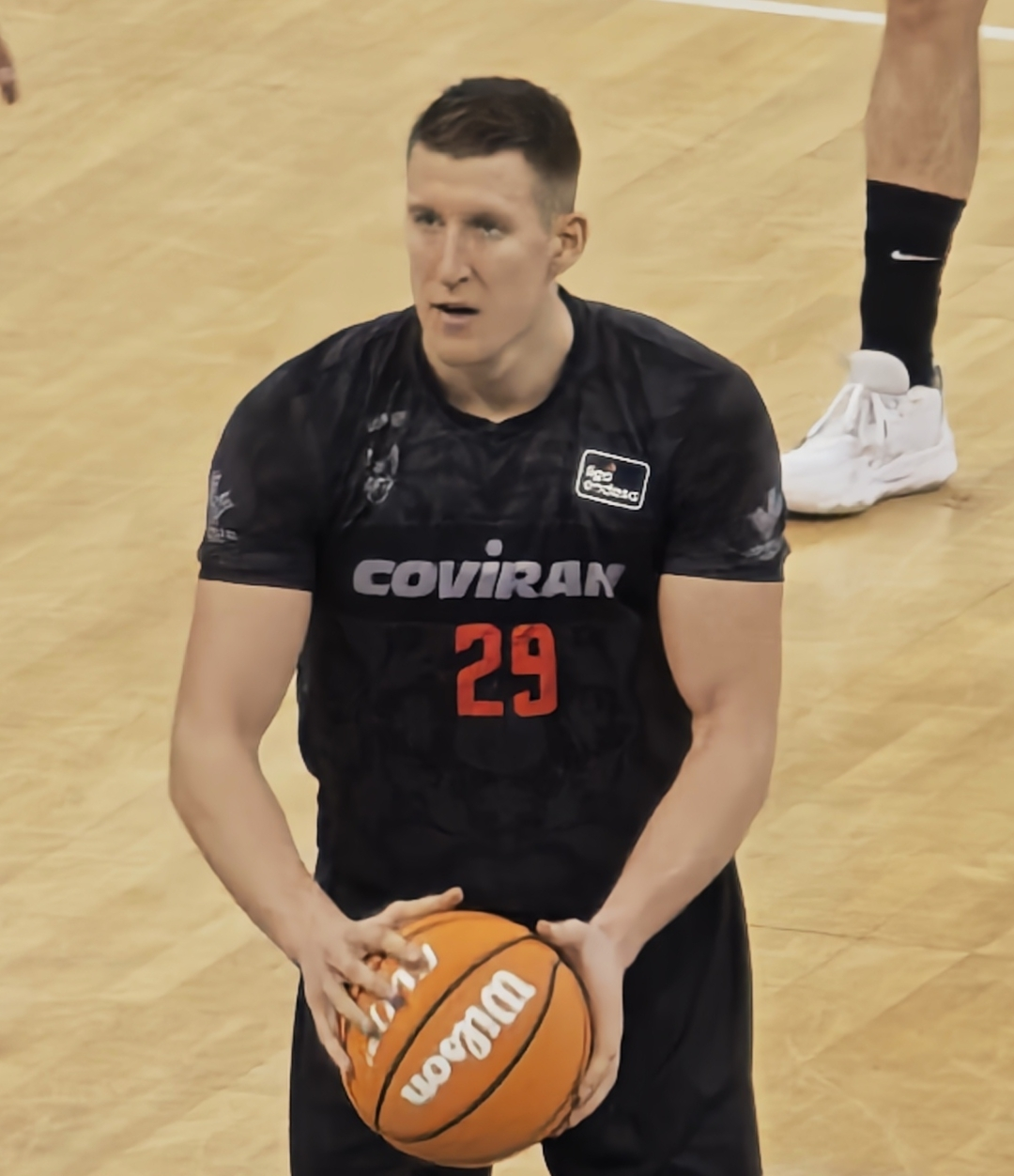
- Božić with Granada in 2025

Free Agent
- Position: Small forward

Personal information
- Born: April 29, 1996 (age 30) Bjelovar, Croatia
- Listed height: 2.00 m (6 ft 7 in)
- Listed weight: 105 kg (231 lb)

Career information
- NBA draft: 2017: undrafted
- Playing career: 2011–present

Career history
- 2012–2014: Bjelovar
- 2014: Pula 1981
- 2014–2017: Zagreb
- 2017–2019: Zadar
- 2019–2020: Budućnost
- 2021–2022: Široki
- 2022–2024: Zadar
- 2024–2025: Valencia
- 2024–2025: →Força Lleida
- 2025–2026: Granada
- 2026: Guangdong Southern Tigers

Career highlights
- 2× ABA League MVP (2023, 2024); 2× All-ABA League Team (2023, 2024); ABA League Top Scorer (2024); 3× ABA League rebounding leader (2018, 2019, 2023); 2× Croatian League champion (2023, 2024); 2× Croatian League Finals MVP (2023, 2024); Croatian Cup winner (2024); Croatian Cup MVP (2024); All-Liga ACB First Team (2026)
Medals
Men's basketball
Representing Croatia
FIBA U19 World Championship
Silver medal – second place	2015 Greece	U-19 Team
FIBA U18 Europe Championship
Bronze medal – third place	2014 Turkey	U-18 Team

Luka Božić (born April 29, 1996) is a Croatian professional basketball player. Standing at 2.00 m, he plays at the small forward position.

== Playing career ==
=== Early years ===
A native of Bjelovar, Croatia, Božić played in the second tier of Croatian basketball for KK Bjelovar until he was picked up by KK Zagreb, a member of the country's top-flight A-1 Liga, in 2014. He immediately established himself as a scoring threat, averaging 15.1 points a game in the 2014-15 campaign. In the 2015–16 season, Božić increased his scoring output to 17.3 points per contest, draining 48.4 percent of his shots taken (177–366) including 38.4 percent (61–159) from three-point range. In 2016–17, he emerged as the second-leading scorer of the A1 league, compiling averages of 22.2 points, 6.8 rebounds and 6.0 assists in 24 A1 contests, shooting 57.6 percent from inside the arc and 31.5 percent from three-point territory.

In April 2017, Božić entered his name for the 2017 NBA draft. At the end of the June 12 NBA Draft deadline, he would be only one of 10 international underclassmen to officially hold his name for the NBA Draft that year. However, he was not drafted.

=== Zadar (2017–2019) ===
In September 2017, he signed a two-year contract with Zadar. Playing for Zadar, Božić was the rebounding leader in consecutive ABA League seasons (2017–18 and 2018–19 season), averaging 17.8 points and 7.2 rebounds per game, respectively.

=== Budućnost (2019–2020) ===
For 2019–20 season, he signed with the Montenegrin club Budućnost. He had limited role in the club, averaging only 3.5 points and 1.5 rebounds over 15 games. He missed the entire 2020–21 season without a club.

=== Široki (2021–2022) ===
In July 2021, after one-year absence, he signed with the Bosnian-Herzegovian club Široki. Playing for Široki, Božić averaged 21.5 points and 7 rebounds over 13 ABA League Second Division games.

=== Second stint with Zadar (2022–2024) ===
In August 2022, Božić returned to Zadar signing a short-term contract with a possibility of renewal. Over 2022–23 season, Božić averaged 22 points, 9.8 rebounds and 6.4 assists over 25 ABA League regular season games. For his performances, he was named the ABA League MVP and the ABA League Ideal Starting Five. Zadar was eliminated in the quarterfinals of the Playoffs series by Crvena zvezda.

During the 2023–24 season, Božić continued with performances from the last season, averaging 19.8 points, 7.8 rebounds and 6.3 assists over 27 games. In April 2024, he was once again named the ABA League MVP (second season in a row) and the ABA League Ideal Starting Five. However, Zadar was once again eliminated in the quarterfinals of the Playoffs series, this time by his former team Budućnost.

=== Valencia (2024–2025) ===
On July 17, 2024, Božić signed a contract with the Spanish team Valencia.

==== Loan to Força Lleida (2024–2025) ====
He was loaned only a month later to newly promoted top-tier team Força Lleida. During the 2024–25 season, he averaged 11.4 points and 3.5 rebounds on 49.6% shooting from the field, in 32 games played.

=== Coviran Granada (2025–2026) ===
On August 8, 2025, he signed for Coviran Granada of the Liga ACB. With Granada, Božić managed to win two back to back ACB Player of the Month awards, for March and April of 2025–26 ACB season.

== National team career ==
He was part of the Croatia youth selections at the 2012 FIBA Europe Under-16 Championship, at the 2014 FIBA Europe Under-18 Championship taking the bronze medal, at the 2015 FIBA Under-19 World Championship taking the silver, the 2015 FIBA Europe Under-20 Championship and the 2016 FIBA Europe Under-20 Championship Division B.
