= ABA League Top Scorer =

European basketball award

The ABA League Top Scorer, also known as the Adriatic League Top Scorer, is an award given to the Top Scorer of each season of the European regional Adriatic ABA League, which is the top-tier level professional basketball league for countries of the former Yugoslavia.

The official Top Scorer of the Regular Season award has been awarded since the 2020–21. Since then the player needs to have appeared in at least 50% the games in the Regular Season and needs to be a member of the AdmiralBet ABA League club when Regular Season ends, to be able to obtain a regular season award.

== Top scorers ==
Season	Top Scorer	Team	PPG
2001–02	(Croatia) Marino Baždarić	(Croatia) Triglav osiguranje	26.2
2002–03	(United States) Kenyan Weaks	(Slovenia) Pivovarna Laško	20.1
2003–04	(Serbia and Montenegro) Igor Rakočević	(Serbia and Montenegro) Crvena zvezda	23.2
2004–05	(Serbia and Montenegro) Dejan Milojević	(Serbia and Montenegro) Partizan	21.8
2005–06	(Serbia and Montenegro) Dejan Milojević (2)	(Serbia and Montenegro) Partizan	17.7
2006–07	(Serbia) Milan Gurović	(Serbia) Crvena zvezda	28.6
2007–08	(Serbia) Tadija Dragićević	(Serbia) Crvena zvezda	20.5
2008–09	(Serbia) Dragan Labović	(Serbia) FMP	18.0
2009–10	(Croatia) Andrija Žižić	(Croatia) Cedevita	17.1
2010–11	(United States) Michael Lee	(Serbia) Radnički	19.6
2011–12	(United States) David Simon	(Serbia) Radnički	19.4
2012–13	(Slovenia) Aleksandar Ćapin	(Serbia) Radnički	17.5
2013–14	(Croatia) Dario Šarić	(Croatia) Cibona	16.3
2014–15	(United States) Malcolm Armstead	(Slovenia) Krka	17.6
2015–16	(Serbia) Tadija Dragićević (2)	(Montenegro) Budućnost	16.3
2016–17	(Serbia) Ivan Marinković	(Croatia) Zadar	17.8
2017–18	(Croatia) Luka Žorić	(Croatia) Cibona	19.7
2018–19	(Serbia) Dragan Apić	(Serbia) FMP	21.2
2019–20	(United States) Lance Harris	(Montenegro) Mornar	18.6
2020–21	(Serbia) Filip Petrušev	(Serbia) Mega Basket	23.7
2021–22	(United States) Shannon Shorter	(Croatia) Split	17.0
2022–23	(United States) Hunter Hale	(Serbia) Borac Mozzart	22.3
2023–24	(Croatia) Luka Božić	(Croatia) Zadar	20.6
2024–25	(United States) Bryce Jones	(Bosnia and Herzegovina) Igokea	18.4
2025–26	(United States) Duane Washington	(Serbia) Partizan	21.2

=== Players with most top-scorer awards ===
Player	Awards	Editions
(Serbia and Montenegro) Dejan Milojević	3	2005, 2006, 2007
(Serbia) Tadija Dragićević	2	2008, 2016

== See also ==
- ABA League MVP
- ABA League Finals MVP
- ABA League Top Prospect
- ABA League Ideal Starting Five
- Player of the Month
- Yugoslav First Federal League Top Scorer
