= 2022–23 ABA League First Division =

22nd ABA League season

AdmiralBet ABA League
- Season: 2022–23
- Duration: 30 September 2022 – 16 April 2023 (Regular season)
- Games played: 26 each
- Teams: 14
- TV partners: Arena Sport, RTV SLO

Regular season
- Top seed: (Serbia) Partizan Mozzart Bet
- Season MVP: (Croatia) Luka Božić
- Promoted: (Basketball Federation of Slovenia) Krka
- Relegated: (Basketball Federation of North Macedonia) MZT Skopje Aerodrom

Finals
- Champions: (Basketball Federation of Serbia) Partizan Mozzart Bet (7th title)
- Runners-up: (Basketball Federation of Serbia) Crvena zvezda Meridianbet
- Semi-finalists: (Basketball Federation of Montenegro) Budućnost VOLI (Basketball Federation of Slovenia) Cedevita Olimpija
- Finals MVP: (United States) Kevin Punter

Awards
- Top Prospect: (Serbia) Nikola Đurišić
- Best Defensive Player: (France) Mathias Lessort
- Best Coach: (Serbia) Željko Obradović

Statistical leaders
Points	(United States) Hunter Hale	22.3
Rebounds	(Croatia) Luka Božić	9.6
Assists	(Croatia) Dominik Mavra	7.3
Index Rating	(Croatia) Luka Božić	32.1

Records
- Biggest home win: Partizan 120–67 MZT (16 January 2023)
- Biggest away win: Budućnost 56–97 Crvena zvezda (23 May 2023)
- Highest scoring: Igokea 109–115 Mega (14 January 2023)
- Winning streak: Partizan 16 games
- Losing streak: Igokea 10 games
- Highest attendance: 22,198; Partizan 96–85 Crvena zvezda (22 June 2023)
- All statistics correct as of 22 June 2023.

The 2022–23 AdmiralBet ABA League was the 22nd season of the ABA League with 14 teams from former Yugoslavia, namely Bosnia and Herzegovina, Croatia, Montenegro, North Macedonia, Serbia, and Slovenia participating in it. It was the first time since the 2017–18 season with a club from North Macedonia participating in it.

== Teams ==
=== Promotion and relegation ===
A total of 14 teams will contest the league in the 2022–23 season (and until the 2024–25 season).

Promoted	(Basketball Federation of North Macedonia) MZT Skopje Aerodrom	2021–22 ABA 2 Runner-up
Relegated	(Basketball Federation of Slovenia) Krka	Finished last

=== Venues and locations ===
Location of teams in the 2022–23 season
Locations of the teams from Belgrade in the 2022–23 season

Team	Home city	Arena	Capacity
(Basketball Federation of Serbia) Borac Mozzart	Čačak	Borac Hall	4,000
(Basketball Federation of Montenegro) Budućnost VOLI	Podgorica	Morača Sports Center	6,000
(Basketball Federation of Slovenia) Cedevita Olimpija	Ljubljana	Arena Stožice	12,480
(Croatian Basketball Federation) Cibona	Zagreb	Dražen Petrović Hall	5,400
(Basketball Federation of Serbia) Crvena zvezda Meridianbet	Belgrade	Aleksandar Nikolić Hall	8,000
(Basketball Federation of Serbia) FMP Meridian	Belgrade	Železnik Hall	3,000
(Basketball Federation of Bosnia and Herzegovina) Igokea m:tel	Aleksandrovac	Laktaši Sports Hall	3,050
(Basketball Federation of Serbia) Mega MIS	Belgrade	Ranko Žeravica Sports Hall	5,000
(Basketball Federation of Montenegro) Mornar Barsko zlato	Bar	Topolica Sport Hall	2,625
(Basketball Federation of North Macedonia) MZT Skopje Aerodrom	Skopje	Jane Sandanski	7,500
(Basketball Federation of Serbia) Partizan Mozzart Bet	Belgrade	Štark Arena	18,386
(Basketball Federation of Montenegro) SC Derby	Podgorica	Morača Sports Center	6,000
(Croatian Basketball Federation) Split	Split	Arena Gripe	3,500
(Croatian Basketball Federation) Zadar	Zadar	Krešimir Ćosić Hall	7,997

=== Personnel and sponsorship ===
Team	Head coach	Captain	Kit manufacturer	Shirt sponsor
Borac Mozzart	(Basketball Federation of Serbia) Dejan Mijatović	(Basketball Federation of Serbia) Nemanja Todorović	—	MozzartSport / P.S. Fashion
Budućnost VOLI	(Basketball Federation of Montenegro) Petar Mijović	(Basketball Federation of Montenegro) Suad Šehović	Number 1	VOLI / Podgorica Capital City
Cedevita Olimpija	(Basketball Federation of Slovenia) Jurica Golemac	(Basketball Federation of Slovenia) Edo Murić	Adidas	Cedevita
Cibona	(Croatian Basketball Federation) Josip Sesar	(Croatian Basketball Federation) Krešimir Radovčić	GBT	Erste Bank
Crvena zvezda Meridianbet	(Basketball Federation of Montenegro) Duško Ivanović	(Basketball Federation of Serbia) Branko Lazić	Adidas	Meridian / mts
FMP Meridian	(Basketball Federation of Serbia) Nenad Stefanović	(USA Basketball) Charles Jenkins	Adidas	Meridian
Igokea m:tel	(Basketball Federation of Serbia) Vladimir Jovanović	(Basketball Federation of Serbia) Marko Jošilo	GBT	m:tel
Mega MIS	(Basketball Federation of Serbia) Marko Barać	(Basketball Federation of Serbia) Luka Cerovina	Adidas	Medical Innovation Solutions / Triglav
Mornar Barsko zlato	(Basketball Federation of Montenegro) Mihailo Pavićević	(Basketball Federation of Montenegro) Sead Šehović	DaCapo	Bar Municipality / Barsko zlato
MZT Skopje Aerodrom	(Basketball Federation of Serbia) Dragan Nikolić	(Basketball Federation of North Macedonia) Damjan Stojanovski	Jako	Zegin
Partizan Mozzart Bet	(Basketball Federation of Serbia) Željko Obradović	(USA Basketball) Kevin Punter	Under Armour	NIS / Mozzart Bet
SC Derby	(Basketball Federation of Slovenia) Andrej Žakelj	(Basketball Federation of Montenegro) Nikola Pavličević	Number 1	Derby
Split	(Croatian Basketball Federation) Srđan Subotić	(Croatian Basketball Federation) Mateo Kedžo	Macron	—
Zadar	(Croatian Basketball Federation) Danijel Jusup	(Croatian Basketball Federation) Marko Ramljak	Macron	OTP Bank / PSK

=== Coaching changes ===
Team	Outgoing manager	Date of vacancy	Position in table	Replaced with	Date of appointment	Ref.
Budućnost VOLI	(Basketball Federation of Serbia) Aleksandar Džikić	15 June 2022	Off-season	(Basketball Federation of Serbia) Vlada Jovanović	13 July 2022	
Mega MIS	(Basketball Federation of Serbia) Vlada Jovanović	16 June 2022	Off-season	(Basketball Federation of Serbia) Marko Barać	20 June 2022	
Cibona	(Basketball Federation of Slovenia) Gašper Okorn	24 June 2022	Off-season	(Croatian Basketball Federation) Josip Sesar	25 July 2022	
Crvena zvezda mts	(Basketball Federation of Montenegro) Dejan Radonjić	30 June 2022	Off-season	(Basketball Federation of Serbia) Vladimir Jovanović	8 July 2022	
Zadar	(Croatian Basketball Federation) Vladimir Anzulović	7 July 2022	Off-season	(Croatian Basketball Federation) Danijel Jusup	7 July 2022	
Crvena zvezda mts	(Basketball Federation of Serbia) Vladimir Jovanović	13 November 2022	6th (4–1)	(Basketball Federation of Montenegro) Duško Ivanović	14 November 2022	
Borac Mozzart	(Basketball Federation of Serbia) Marko Marinović	28 November 2022	14th (1–7)	(Basketball Federation of Serbia) Dejan Mijatović	28 November 2022	
MZT Skopje Aerodrom	(Basketball Federation of North Macedonia) Aleksandar Petrović	24 December 2022	14th (2–9)	(Basketball Federation of Serbia) Dragan Nikolić	27 December 2022	
Igokea m:tel	(Basketball Federation of Bosnia and Herzegovina) Dragan Bajić	14 January 2023	11th (5–9)	(Basketball Federation of Serbia) Vladimir Jovanović	17 January 2023	
Budućnost VOLI	(Basketball Federation of Serbia) Vlada Jovanović	15 April 2023	3rd (18–7)	(Basketball Federation of Montenegro) Petar Mijović	16 April 2023	

=== Referees ===
A total of 55 ABA officials set to work on the 2022–23 season in ABA 1 and ABA 2:

The list of referees for the 2022–23 season
(Bosnia and Herzegovina) Dragan Porobić; (Bosnia and Herzegovina) Ernad Karović; (Bosnia and Herzegovina) Ivan Milićević; (Bosnia and Herzegovina) Nermin Nikšić; (Bosnia and Herzegovina) Tomislav Stapić; (Bosnia and Herzegovina) Vladimir Marić; (Croatia) Bojan Kruljac; (Croatia) Boris Hartman; (Croatia) Branimir Galić; (Croatia) Denis Hadžić; (Croatia) Gordan Terlević; (Croatia) Hrvoje Muhvić; (Croatia) Josip Radojković; (Croatia) Krešimir Katić; (Croatia) Krunoslav Peić; (Croatia) Luka Kardum; (Croatia) Marko Stanković; (Croatia) Marko Mustapić; (Croatia) Mateo Pavičić	(Croatia) Tomislav Hordov; (Croatia) Tomislav Vovk; (Montenegro) Bojan Popović; (Montenegro) Igor Dragojević; (Montenegro) Igor Janjušević; (Montenegro) Miloš Koljenšić; (Montenegro) Miodrag Lakićević; (Montenegro) Radoš Savović; (Montenegro) Vojislav Lepetić; (North Macedonia) Aleksandar Davidov; (North Macedonia) Boro Antovski; (North Macedonia) Nikola Jakimovski; (Serbia) Aleksandar Milojević; (Serbia) Dragan Matić; (Serbia) Duško Sedlar; (Serbia) Ilija Belošević; (Serbia) Ivan Stefanović; (Serbia) Marko Juras; (Serbia) Marko Pecelj	(Serbia) Milivoje Jovčić; (Serbia) Miloš Hadžić; (Serbia) Radoš Arsenijević; (Serbia) Stefan Ćalić; (Serbia) Strahinja Dašić; (Serbia) Uroš Obrknežević; (Serbia) Uroš Nikolić; (Serbia) Vladimir Vesković; (Slovenia) Damir Javor; (Slovenia) Damjan Gajšek; (Slovenia) Edo Javor; (Slovenia) Mario Majkić; (Slovenia) Matej Boltauzer; (Slovenia) Milan Nedović; (Slovenia) Rok Misson; (Slovenia) Saša Pukl; (Slovenia) Sašo Petek

== Regular season ==
The regular season is scheduled commence on 1 October 2022 and end on 16 April 2023.

=== League table ===
Pos	Team	Pld	W	L	PF	PA	PD	Pts	Qualification or relegation
1	(Basketball Federation of Serbia) Partizan Mozzart Bet	26	24	2	2424	2025	+399	50	Advance to the Playoffs
2	(Basketball Federation of Serbia) Crvena zvezda Meridianbet	26	23	3	2262	1890	+372	49	Advance to the Playoffs
3	(Basketball Federation of Montenegro) Budućnost VOLI	26	18	8	2263	2027	+236	44	Advance to the Playoffs
4	(Basketball Federation of Slovenia) Cedevita Olimpija	26	17	9	2205	2068	+137	43	Advance to the Playoffs
5	(Basketball Federation of Serbia) FMP Meridian	26	14	12	2339	2245	+94	40	Advance to the Playoffs
6	(Basketball Federation of Serbia) Mega MIS	26	12	14	2203	2234	−31	38	Advance to the Playoffs
7	(Croatian Basketball Federation) Zadar	26	11	15	2230	2234	−4	37	Advance to the Playoffs
8	(Basketball Federation of Montenegro) SC Derby	26	11	15	2189	2300	−111	37	Advance to the Playoffs
9	(Basketball Federation of Bosnia and Herzegovina) Igokea m:tel	26	11	15	2093	2189	−96	37	
10	(Croatian Basketball Federation) Split	26	10	16	2144	2247	−103	36	
11	(Croatian Basketball Federation) Cibona	26	9	17	2071	2337	−266	35	
12	(Basketball Federation of Montenegro) Mornar Barsko zlato	26	8	18	2165	2375	−210	34	
13	(Basketball Federation of Serbia) Borac Mozzart	26	7	19	2147	2336	−189	33	Qualification to the relegation playoffs
14	(Basketball Federation of North Macedonia) MZT Skopje Aerodrom	26	7	19	2088	2316	−228	33	Relegation to the Second Division

Source: ABA League

=== Positions by round ===
Advance to the Playoffs	Qualification to the relegation playoffs	Relegated

Team ╲ Round	1	2	3	4	5	6	7	8	9	10	11	12	13	14	15	16	17	18	19	20	21	22	23	24	25	26
(Serbia) Partizan Mozzart Bet	3	1	1	1	1	1	1	1	1	1	1	1	1	1	1	1	1	1	1	1	1	1	1	1	1	1
(Serbia) Crvena zvezda Meridianbet	4	3	8	6	4	6	3	3	3	3	2	2	2	2	2	2	2	2	2	2	2	2	2	2	2	2
(Montenegro) Budućnost VOLI	1	6	3	2	3	5	4	4	5	5	5	5	5	5	5	5	5	3	3	3	3	3	3	3	3	3
(Slovenia) Cedevita Olimpija	5	2	7	9	8	9	7	5	4	4	4	4	4	3	3	4	4	5	4	4	4	4	4	4	4	4
(Serbia) FMP Soccerbet	6	5	2	4	2	2	2	2	2	2	3	3	3	4	4	3	3	4	5	5	5	5	5	5	5	5
(Serbia) Mega MIS	9	11	12	13	14	12	11	11	10	10	11	12	12	11	9	8	8	8	8	7	7	6	6	6	6	6
(Croatia) Zadar	2	7	4	3	5	3	5	6	6	6	6	6	6	6	6	6	6	6	6	6	6	7	7	7	7	7
(Montenegro) SC Derby	13	9	9	10	10	10	9	8	9	9	9	11	9	7	7	7	7	7	7	8	8	8	8	9	8	8
(Bosnia and Herzegovina) Igokea m:tel	8	8	5	5	6	4	6	7	7	7	7	7	8	10	11	11	11	11	12	13	12	11	11	11	11	9
(Croatia) Split	14	14	14	14	12	11	12	13	13	11	13	10	11	9	10	10	9	9	9	9	9	9	9	8	9	10
(Croatia) Cibona	12	12	10	8	7	8	10	10	11	12	10	8	7	8	8	9	10	10	10	10	10	10	10	10	10	11
(Montenegro) Mornar Barsko zlato	7	4	6	7	9	7	8	9	8	8	8	9	10	12	12	12	12	12	11	11	11	12	13	13	12	12
(Serbia) Borac Mozzart	10	10	11	12	13	14	14	14	14	13	12	13	13	13	13	13	13	13	13	12	13	13	12	12	13	13
(North Macedonia) MZT Skopje Aerodrom	11	13	13	11	11	13	13	12	12	14	14	14	14	14	14	14	14	14	14	14	14	14	14	14	14	14

Source: ABA League

=== Results ===
Home \ Away	BOR	BUD	COL	CIB	CZV	FMP	IGO	MEG	MOR	MZT	PAR	SCD	SPL	ZAD
Borac Mozzart	—	79–108	74–76	83–84	82–87	84–85	70–65	80–86	90–87	105–84	62–81	92–90	90–89	91–93
Budućnost VOLI	85–87	—	80–74	97–76	56–76	84–58	91–58	79–66	99–78	89–66	82–83	88–76	94–59	76–68
Cedevita Olimpija	98–81	58–80	—	91–85	70–84	85–90	83–73	85–70	100–79	93–73	77–74	84–83	102–88	97–79
Cibona	87–85	83–87	78–90	—	85–81	110–99	77–76	72–106	91–88	87–85	81–105	89–98	72–90	63–89
Crvena zvezda Meridianbet	86–57	69–65	100–95	92–53	—	83–77	104–71	92–58	93–77	87–67	90–74	90–70	83–74	96–98
FMP Meridian	107–81	96–91	79–86	111–75	84–99	—	89–77	90–76	101–76	101–97	91–97	90–73	90–73	112–87
Igokea m:tel	90–78	103–101	74–85	81–67	70–76	77–70	—	109–115	83–91	96–90	85–96	75–74	88–92	81–84
Mega MIS	86–74	76–85	82–96	93–100	78–87	77–72	76–87	—	89–78	93–86	78–103	101–74	90–85	80–77
Mornar Barsko zlato	104–99	87–104	78–75	83–81	65–87	102–113	74–86	85–101	—	93–84	62–83	75–86	104–88	100–91
MZT Skopje Aerodrom	73–81	86–90	79–74	87–74	57–80	87–82	78–84	94–82	77–94	—	74–92	92–79	80–85	84–80
Partizan Mozzart Bet	114–84	106–77	76–73	93–68	92–81	90–86	89–74	86–76	92–74	120–67	—	91–82	89–70	114–77
SC Derby	93–84	69–86	71–104	97–84	76–92	84–74	104–85	83–103	94–74	103–85	81–100	—	96–84	101–100
Split	113–99	87–85	77–95	82–74	63–72	91–95	68–77	79–75	91–80	74–77	95–96	82–85	—	89–85
Zadar	85–75	103–104	81–59	68–75	76–95	103–97	67–68	96–90	97–77	98–79	78–88	96–67	74–76	—

Source: ABA League
Legend: Blue = home team win; Red = away team win.
Matches with lighter background shading were decided after overtime.

=== Results by round ===
The table lists the results of teams in each round.

Win	Loss	Postponed

Team ╲ Round	1	2	3	4	5	6	7	8	9	10	11	12	13	14	15	16	17	18	19	20	21	22	23	24	25	26
(Serbia) Partizan Mozzart Bet	W	W	W	W	W	W	W	L	W	L	W	W	W	W	W	W	W	W	W	W	W	W	W	W	W	W
(Serbia) Crvena zvezda Meridianbet	W	W	W	W	W	L	W	W	W	W	W	W	W	W	W	W	W	W	W	L	L	W	W	W	W	W
(Montenegro) Budućnost VOLI	W	L	W	W	L	L	W	W	L	W	W	W	W	L	L	W	W	W	W	W	W	L	W	W	W	L
(Slovenia) Cedevita Olimpija	W	W	L	L	W	L	W	W	W	W	W	W	W	W	W	L	L	L	W	W	L	W	L	W	L	W
(Serbia) FMP Meridian	W	W	W	L	W	W	W	W	L	W	L	W	W	L	W	W	L	L	L	L	L	W	L	L	L	W
(Serbia) Mega MIS	L	L	L	L	L	W	W	L	W	L	L	L	L	W	W	W	W	L	W	W	W	W	W	L	L	L
(Croatia) Zadar	W	L	W	W	L	W	L	L	W	W	W	L	L	L	W	L	W	L	L	L	W	L	L	L	W	L
(Croatia) Split	L	L	L	L	W	W	L	L	L	W	L	W	L	W	L	L	W	W	W	L	L	W	L	W	L	L
(Montenegro) SC Derby	L	W	L	L	W	L	W	W	L	L	L	L	W	W	W	L	W	W	L	L	W	L	L	L	W	L
(Croatia) Cibona	L	L	W	W	W	L	L	L	L	L	W	W	W	L	L	L	L	W	L	W	L	L	W	L	L	L
(Bosnia and Herzegovina) Igokea m:tel	L	W	W	W	L	W	L	L	W	L	L	L	L	W	L	L	L	L	L	L	W	W	W	W	L	W
(Serbia) Borac Mozzart	L	L	L	L	L	L	L	W	L	W	W	L	L	L	L	W	L	L	L	W	L	L	W	L	L	W
(Montenegro) Mornar Barsko zlato	W	W	L	L	L	W	L	L	W	L	L	L	L	L	L	W	L	L	W	L	W	L	L	L	W	L
(North Macedonia) MZT Skopje Aerodrom	L	L	L	W	L	L	L	W	L	L	L	L	L	L	L	L	L	W	L	W	L	L	L	W	W	W

Source: ABA League

== Playoffs ==
On 14 September 2021, the ABA League JTD decided that eight highest-placed clubs from the Regular season will qualify for the Playoffs.

=== Quarterfinals ===
Team 1	Series	Team 2	Game 1	Game 2	Game 3
Partizan Mozzart Bet (Serbia)	2–1	(Montenegro) SC Derby	83–84	81–79	112–83
Cedevita Olimpija (Slovenia)	2–1	(Serbia) FMP Soccerbet	87–77	96–102	97–79
Crvena zvezda Meridianbet (Serbia)	2–0	(Croatia) Zadar	100–73	74–63	—
Budućnost VOLI (Montenegro)	2–0	(Serbia) Mega MIS	94–77	82–80	—

=== Semifinals ===
Team 1	Series	Team 2	Game 1	Game 2	Game 3
Partizan Mozzart Bet (Serbia)	2–1	(Slovenia) Cedevita Olimpija	85–70	83–95	90–71
Crvena zvezda Meridianbet (Serbia)	2–0	(Montenegro) Budućnost VOLI	93–55	97–56	—

=== Finals ===
Team 1	Series	Team 2	Game 1	Game 2	Game 3	Game 4	Game 5
Partizan Mozzart Bet (Serbia)	3–2	(Serbia) Crvena zvezda Meridianbet	88–80	87–78	78–91	56–68	96–85

== Relegation playoffs ==
The 13th placed team in the First Division season and the runners-up in the Second Division played for a spot in the First Division the following season.

Qualified clubs
Leagues	Clubs
First Division	(Serbia) Borac Čačak
Second Division	(Slovenia) Helios Suns

=== Results ===
Team 1	Series	Team 2	Game 1	Game 2	Game 3
Borac Čačak (Serbia)	2–1	(Slovenia) Helios Suns	96–78	101–107	97–67

==== Game 1 ====
25 April 2023	Borac Čačak (Serbia)	96–78 (Series: 1–0)	(Slovenia) Helios Suns	Čačak
18:00	Scoring by quarter: 28–19, 29–23, 19–24, 20–12
	Pts: Baldwin, Hale 25; Rebs: Lešić 14; Asts: Hale 6 PIR: Gagić 26	Boxscore	Pts: Luke 14; Rebs: Buljević 7 Asts: Luke 7 PIR: Bačvić 18	Arena: Borac Hall; Attendance: 1,500; Referees: Miloš Koljenšić, Dragan Porobić, Marko Mustapić

==== Game 2 ====
28 April 2023	Helios Suns (Slovenia)	107–101 (Series: 1–1)	(Serbia) Borac Čačak	Domžale
20:00	Scoring by quarter: 19–23, 29–28, 28–23, 31–27
	Pts: Mahkovic 31; Rebs: Mirtič 9 Asts: Luke 11; PIR: Mahkovic 33	Boxscore	Pts: Hale 38; Rebs: Gagić 9 Asts: Baldwin, Hale 4 PIR: Hale 35	Arena: Komunalni center Hall; Attendance: 1,500; Referees: Luka Kardum, Igor Dragojević, Miloš Koljenšić

==== Game 3 ====
2 May 2023	Borac Čačak (Serbia)	97–67 (Series: 2–1)	(Slovenia) Helios Suns	Čačak
18:00	Scoring by quarter: 22–19, 14–13, 36–9, 25–26
	Pts: Hale 30; Rebs: Gagić 7 Asts: Hale 5 PIR: Baldwin, Hale 28	Boxscore	Pts: Luke 17; Rebs: Luke 6 Asts: Luke 6 PIR: Luke 23	Arena: Borac Hall; Attendance: 2,000; Referees: Luka Kardum, Dragan Porobić, Marko Mustapić

== Awards ==
Pos.	Player	Team	Ref.
MVP
SF	(Croatia) Luka Božić	(Croatia) Zadar	
Finals MVP
G	(United States) Kevin Punter	(Serbia) Partizan Mozzart Bet	
Top Scorer
SG	(United States) Hunter Hale	(Serbia) Borac Mozzart	
Best Defensive Player
C	(France) Mathias Lessort	(Serbia) Partizan Mozzart Bet	
Top Prospect
SG	(Serbia) Nikola Đurišić	(Serbia) Mega MIS	
Coach of the Season
HC	(Serbia) Željko Obradović	(Serbia) Partizan Mozzart Bet	
The Ideal Starting Five
PG	(Argentina) Facundo Campazzo	(Serbia) Crvena zvezda Meridianbet	
SG	(United States) Kevin Punter	(Serbia) Partizan Mozzart Bet	
SF	(Australia) Dante Exum	(Serbia) Partizan Mozzart Bet	
PF	(Croatia) Luka Božić	(Croatia) Zadar	
C	(France) Mathias Lessort	(Serbia) Partizan Mozzart Bet	

== MVP List ==
=== MVP of the Round ===
Round	Player	Team	PIR
1	(Croatia) Luka Božić	(Croatia) Zadar	48
2	(United States) Fatts Russell	(Montenegro) Mornar Barsko zlato	48
3	(Croatia) Luka Božić (2)	(Croatia) Zadar (2)	51
4	(Montenegro) Nikola Ivanović	(Serbia) Crvena zvezda mts	30
5	(United States) Trent Frazier	(Serbia) FMP Meridian	43
6	(Montenegro) Vladimir Mihailović	(Montenegro) Mornar Barsko zlato (2)	31
7	(Serbia) Nemanja Nedović	(Serbia) Crvena zvezda mts (2)	30
8	(Bosnia and Herzegovina) Aleksandar Lazić	(Montenegro) Budućnost VOLI	36
9	(United States) Fatts Russell (2)	(Montenegro) Mornar Barsko zlato (3)	46
10	(United States) Trent Frazier (2)	(Serbia) FMP Meridian (2)	37
11	(Croatia) Luka Božić (3)	(Croatia) Zadar (3)	46
12	(Croatia) Dominik Mavra	(Croatia) Split	26
13	(United States) Trent Frazier (3)	(Serbia) FMP Meridian (3)	51
14	(United States) Loren Jackson	(Montenegro) SC Derby	37
15	(Slovenia) Alen Omić	(Slovenia) Cedevita Olimpija	39
16	(Guinea) Alpha Kaba	(Montenegro) Budućnost VOLI (2)	30
17	(Croatia) Matej Rudan	(Serbia) Mega MIS	32
18	(United States) Keandre Cook	(North Macedonia) MZT Skopje Aerodrom	31
19	(Slovenia) Gregor Glas	(Montenegro) Mornar Barsko zlato (4)	31
20	(United States) Mike Caffey	(North Macedonia) MZT Skopje Aerodrom (2)	34
21	(France) Mathias Lessort	(Serbia) Partizan Mozzart Bet	38
22	(Slovenia) Alen Omić (2)	(Slovenia) Cedevita Olimpija (2)	32
23	(Croatia) Lovro Mazalin	(Croatia) Cibona	45
24	(United States) Lewis Sullivan	(Croatia) Split (2)	38
25	(Croatia) Luka Božić (4)	(Croatia) Zadar (4)	42
26	(Serbia) Filip Petrušev	(Serbia) Crvena zvezda Meridianbet (3)	36
QF1	(United States) Erick Green	(Montenegro) Budućnost VOLI (3)	39
QF2	(United States) Beau Beech	(Serbia) FMP Meridian (3)	35
QF3	(United States) Yogi Ferrell	(Slovenia) Cedevita Olimpija (3)	26
SF1	(Serbia) Luka Mitrović	(Serbia) Crvena zvezda mts (3)	23
SF2	(United States) Yogi Ferrell (2)	(Slovenia) Cedevita Olimpija (4)	36
SF3	(United States) Zach LeDay	(Serbia) Partizan Mozzart Bet (2)	19
F1	(United States) Kevin Punter	(Serbia) Partizan Mozzart Bet (3)	26
F2	(United States) Zach LeDay (2)	(Serbia) Partizan Mozzart Bet (4)	18
F3	(Serbia) Filip Petrušev (2)	(Serbia) Crvena zvezda mts (4)	23
F4	(Serbia) Ognjen Dobrić	(Serbia) Crvena zvezda mts (5)	18
F5	(United States) Kevin Punter (2)	(Serbia) Partizan Mozzart Bet (5)	36

Source: ABA League

=== MVP of the Month ===
Month	Player	Team	Ref.
2022
October	(Argentina) Luca Vildoza	(Serbia) Crvena zvezda mts	
November	(Lithuania) Paulius Valinskas	(Serbia) FMP Meridian	
December	(United States) Yogi Ferrell	(Slovenia) Cedevita Olimpija	
2023
January	(Argentina) Facundo Campazzo	(Serbia) Crvena zvezda mts	
February	(Serbia) Nemanja Nedović	(Serbia) Crvena zvezda mts	
March	(Croatia) Matej Rudan	(Serbia) Mega MIS	

== Clubs in European competitions ==
Competition	Team	Progress	Result
EuroLeague	(Basketball Federation of Serbia) Partizan Mozzart Bet	Playoffs	Eliminated by (Spanish Basketball Federation) Real Madrid, 2–3
EuroLeague	(Basketball Federation of Serbia) Crvena zvezda Meridianbet	Regular season	10th (17–17)
EuroCup	(Basketball Federation of Montenegro) Budućnost VOLI	Eighthfinals	Eliminated by (Germany) Ratiopharm Ulm, 83–92
EuroCup	(Basketball Federation of Slovenia) Cedevita Olimpija	Regular season Group A	10th (3–15)
Champions League	(Basketball Federation of Bosnia and Herzegovina) Igokea m:tel	Play-ins	Eliminated by (Israel) Hapoel Holon, 0–2
Champions League	(Basketball Federation of Serbia) FMP Meridian	Qualification Group D	Eliminated in final by (Denmark) Bakken Bears, 82–88

== Average home attendances ==
As of 22 April 2023

Pos	Team	Total	High	Low	Average	Change
1	(Serbia) Partizan Mozzart Bet	98,130	17,124	3,396	7,548	+48.2%
2	(Serbia) Crvena zvezda Maridianbet	47,112	7,464	1,197	3,623	−1.2%
3	(North Macedonia) MZT Skopje Aerodrom	35,510	5,500	1,420	2,731	n/a
4	(Croatia) Zadar	30,885	6,000	1,000	2,375	+239.3%
5	(Croatia) Split	26,900	2,500	500	2,069	+114.4%
6	(Slovenia) Cedevita Olimpija	22,688	5,127	500	1,889	−10.0%
7	(Montenegro) Budućnost VOLI	23,630	5,200	550	1,817	+32.0%
8	(Serbia) Borac Mozzart	19,500	2,500	500	1,500	+31.3%
9	(Bosnia and Herzegovina) Igokea m:tel	18,180	3,330	500	1,398	+70.7%
10	(Serbia) FMP Soccerbet	17,146	2,342	437	1,318	+31.0%
11	(Serbia) Mega MIS	16,191	2,500	426	1,245	+153.0%
12	(Montenegro) Mornar Barsko zlato	14,314	1,800	562	1,192	+75.3%
13	(Croatia) Cibona	12,250	1,500	400	942	+16.7%
14	(Montenegro) SC Derby	10,364	2,500	154	797	+146.0%
	League total	392,790	17,124	154	2,182	+43.5%

Source: AdmiralBet ABA League

== See also ==
- List of current ABA League First Division team rosters
- 2022–23 ABA League Second Division

ABA teams

- 2022–23 KK Crvena zvezda season
- 2022–23 KK Partizan season

2022–23 domestic competitions

- (Basketball Federation of Bosnia and Herzegovina) 2022–23 Basketball Championship of Bosnia and Herzegovina
- (Croatian Basketball Federation) 2022–23 HT Premijer liga
- (Basketball Federation of Montenegro) 2022–23 Prva A liga
- (Basketball Federation of North Macedonia) 2022–23 Macedonian First League
- (Basketball Federation of Serbia) 2022–23 Basketball League of Serbia
- (Basketball Federation of Slovenia) 2022–23 Slovenian Basketball League
