= ABA League Ideal Starting Five =

Basketball league honor

The ABA League Ideal Starting Five, also known as the All-ABA League Team, is an honor which is given to the best five players of a given ABA League season. The ideal five of the season are selected by head coaches, fans and the ABA League Commission, with the coaches contributing 60%, the fans 30% and the Commission 10% of the votes for the final result.

== Teams ==
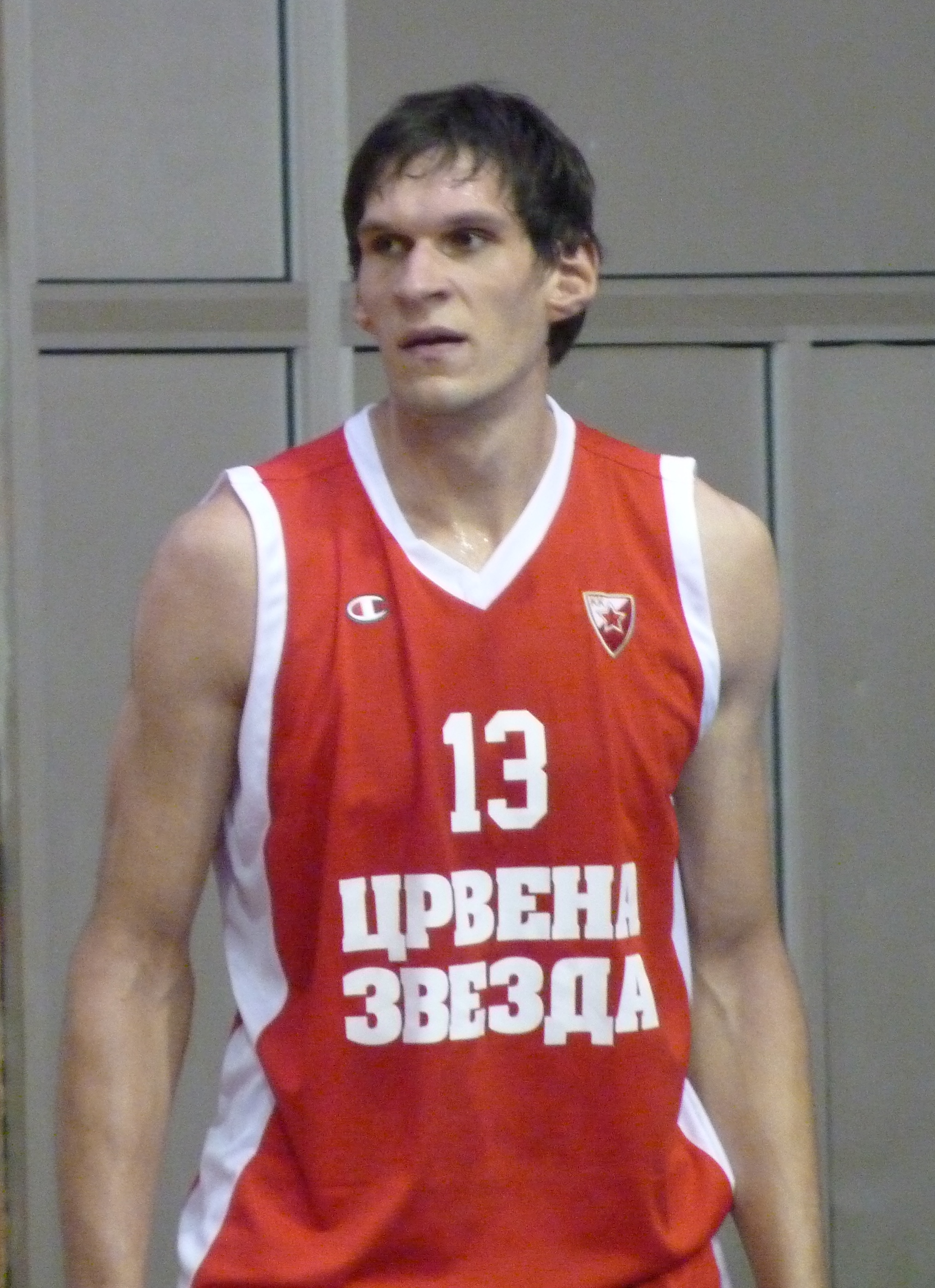
Boban Marjanović had a place in the team in 2014 and 2015

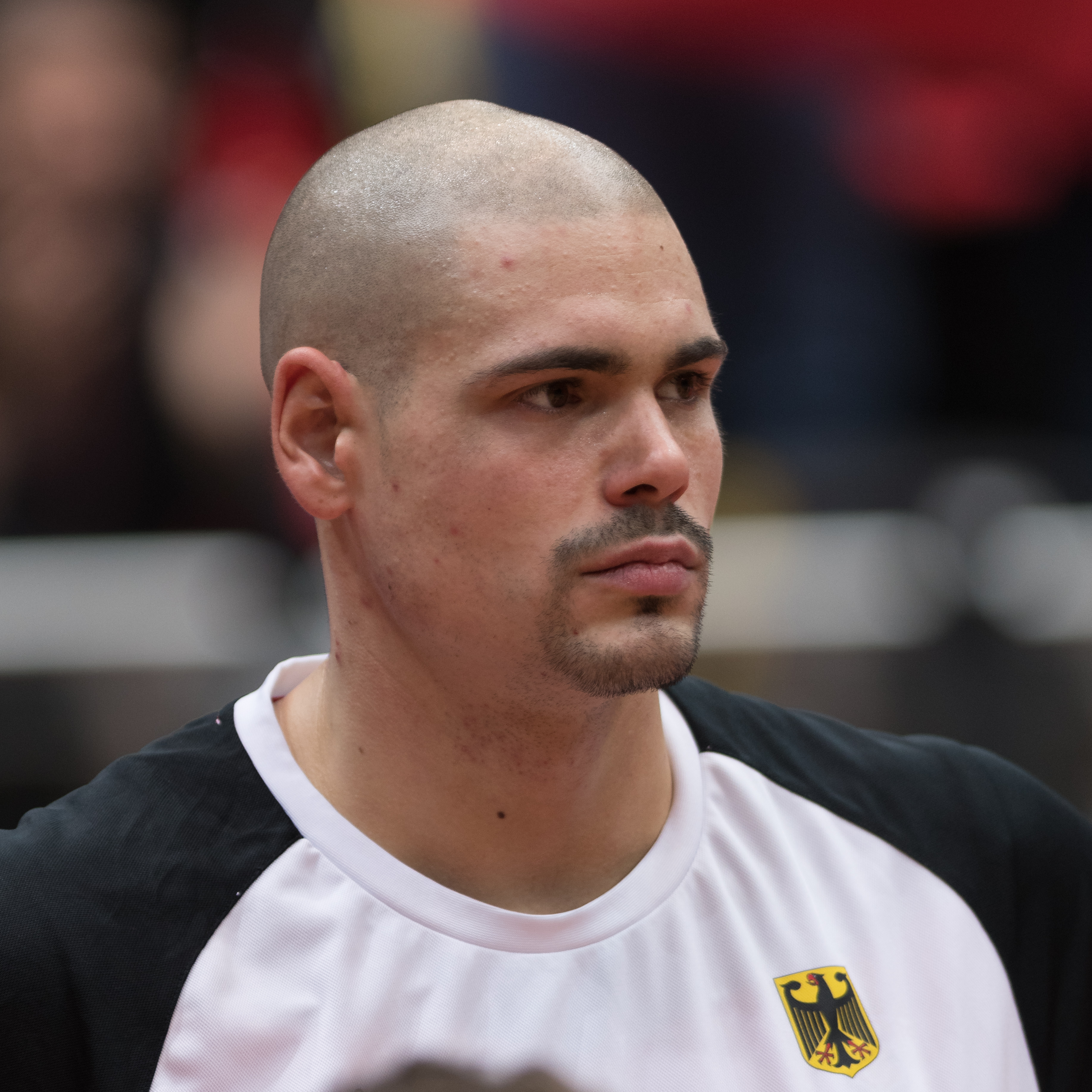
Maik Zirbes was the ideal center in 2016

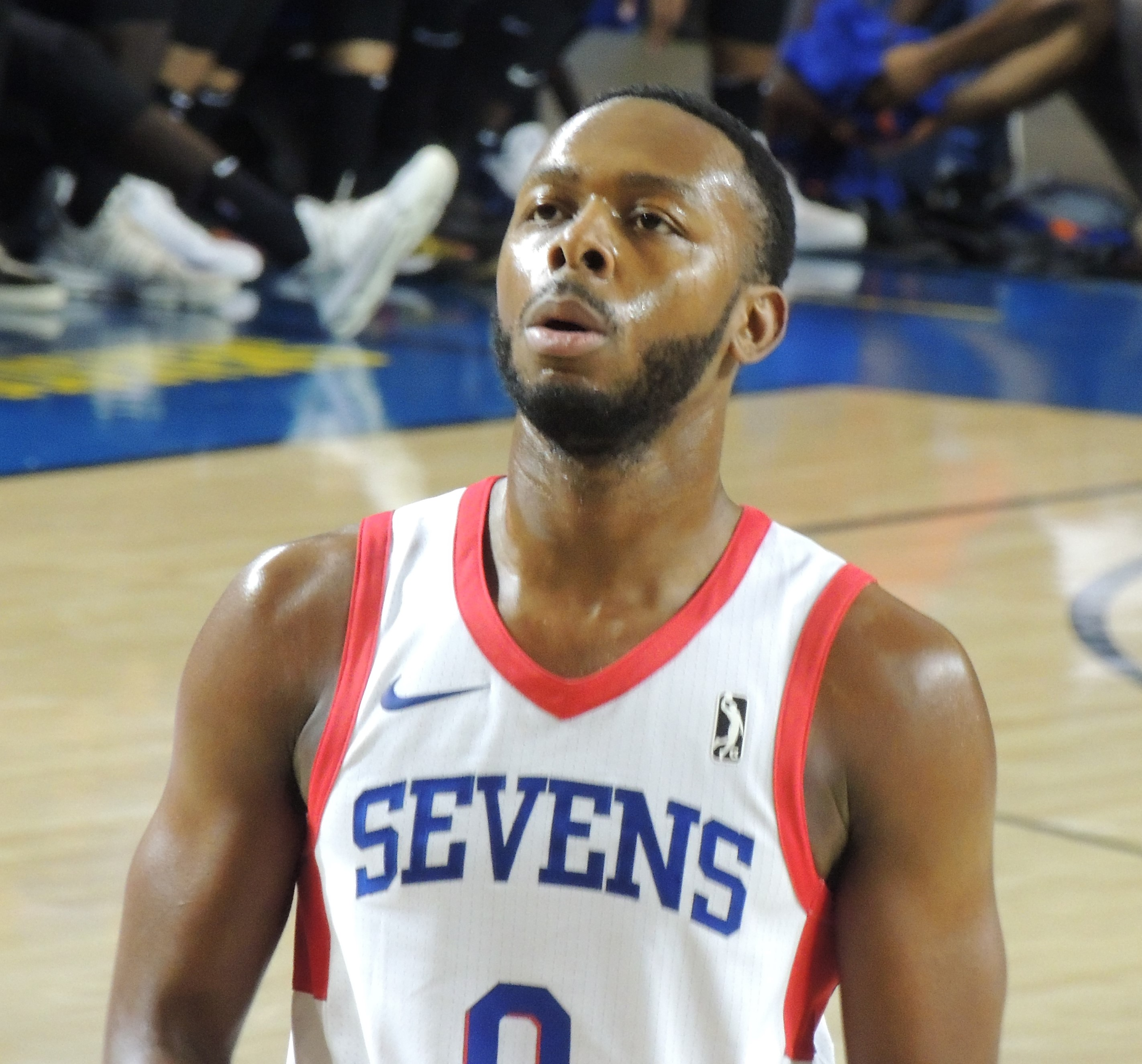
Guard Jacob Pullen made the team in 2016

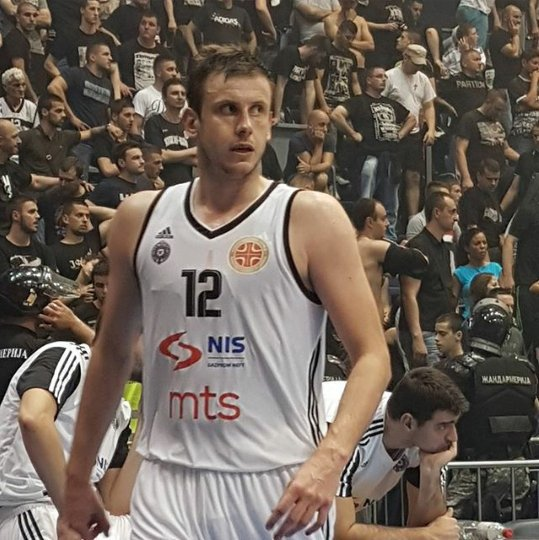
Novica Veličković made the team in 2017 and 2018

Player (X)	Denotes the number of times the player has been selected
**Bold**	Indicates the player who won the Most Valuable Player Award in the same year

Season	Pos.	Player	Club	Ref.
2013–14	G	(United States) DeMarcus Nelson	(Serbia) Crvena zvezda	
2013–14	G	(Serbia) Bogdan Bogdanović	(Serbia) Partizan	
2013–14	F	(Croatia) **Dario Šarić**	(Croatia) Cibona	
2013–14	F	(France) Joffrey Lauvergne	(Serbia) Partizan	
2013–14	C	(Serbia) Boban Marjanović	(Serbia) Crvena zvezda	
2014–15	G	(United States) Malcolm Armstead	(Slovenia) Krka	
2014–15	G	(Montenegro) Suad Šehović	(Montenegro) Budućnost	
2014–15	F	(Serbia) Sasha Pavlović	(Serbia) Partizan	
2014–15	F	(Serbia) Milan Mačvan	(Serbia) Partizan	
2014–15	C	(Serbia) Boban Marjanović (2)	(Serbia) Crvena zvezda	
2015–16	G	(Georgia (country)) Jacob Pullen	(Croatia) Cedevita	
2015–16	G	(France) Timothé Luwawu-Cabarrot	(Serbia) Mega Leks	
2015–16	F	(Serbia) Tadija Dragićević	(Montenegro) Budućnost	
2015–16	F	(Croatia) **Miro Bilan**	(Croatia) Cedevita	
2015–16	C	(Germany) Maik Zirbes	(Serbia) Crvena zvezda	
2016–17	G	(Serbia) Stefan Jović	(Serbia) Crvena zvezda	
2016–17	G	(Serbia) Charles Jenkins	(Serbia) Crvena zvezda	
2016–17	F	(Serbia) Marko Simonović	(Serbia) Crvena zvezda	
2016–17	F	(Serbia) Novica Veličković	(Serbia) Partizan	
2016–17	C	(Croatia) Miro Bilan (2)	(Croatia) Cedevita	
2017–18	G	(Montenegro) Taylor Rochestie	(Serbia) Crvena zvezda	
2017–18	G	(Bosnia and Herzegovina) Nemanja Gordić	(Montenegro) Budućnost	
2017–18	F	(Bosnia and Herzegovina) Džanan Musa	(Croatia) Cedevita	
2017–18	F	(Serbia) Novica Veličković (2)	(Serbia) Partizan	
2017–18	C	(Serbia) Uroš Luković	(Montenegro) Mornar	
2018–19	G	(United States) Joe Ragland	(Serbia) Crvena zvezda	
2018–19	G	(Georgia (country)) Jacob Pullen (2)	(Croatia) Cedevita	
2018–19	F	(Greece) Stratos Perperoglou	(Serbia) Crvena zvezda	
2018–19	F	(Australia) Jock Landale	(Serbia) Partizan	
2018–19	C	(Georgia (country)) **Goga Bitadze**	(Montenegro) Budućnost	
2020–21	G	(United States) Jordan Loyd	(Serbia) Crvena zvezda	
2020–21	G	(Montenegro) Nikola Ivanović	(Montenegro) Budućnost	
2020–21	F	(Slovenia) Jaka Blažič	(Slovenia) Cedevita Olimpija	
2020–21	F	(Montenegro) Marko Simonović	(Serbia) Mega Soccerbet	
2020–21	C	(Serbia) **Filip Petrušev**	(Serbia) Mega Soccerbet	
2021–22	G	(United States) Kevin Punter	(Serbia) Partizan NIS	
2021–22	G	(Slovenia) Jaka Blažič (2)	(Slovenia) Cedevita Olimpija	
2021–22	F	(Serbia) **Nikola Kalinić**	(Serbia) Crvena zvezda mts	
2021–22	F	(United States) Zach LeDay	(Serbia) Partizan NIS	
2021–22	C	(Bosnia and Herzegovina) Kenan Kamenjaš	(Montenegro) SC Derby	
2022–23	G	(Argentina) Facundo Campazzo	(Serbia) Crvena zvezda Meridianbet	
2022–23	G	(United States) Kevin Punter (2)	(Serbia) Partizan Mozzart Bet	
2022–23	F	(Australia) Dante Exum	(Serbia) Partizan Mozzart Bet	
2022–23	F	(Croatia) **Luka Božić**	(Croatia) Zadar	
2022–23	C	(France) Mathias Lessort	(Serbia) Partizan Mozzart Bet	
2023–24	G	(Serbia) Nikola Topić	(Serbia) Mega MIS / (Serbia) Crvena zvezda Meridianbet	
2023–24	G	(Serbia) Miloš Teodosić	(Serbia) Crvena zvezda Meridianbet	
2023–24	F	(Croatia) **Luka Božić** (2)	(Croatia) Zadar	
2023–24	F	(United States) Zach LeDay (2)	(Serbia) Partizan Mozzart Bet	
2023–24	C	(Bosnia and Herzegovina) Kenan Kamenjaš (2)	(Montenegro) SC Derby / (Montenegro) Budućnost VOLI	
2024–25	G	(United States) Bryce Jones	(Bosnia and Herzegovina) Igokea m:tel	
2024–25	G	(United States) **McKinley Wright**	(Montenegro) Budućnost VOLI	
2024–25	F	(United States) Sterling Brown	(Serbia) Partizan Mozzart Bet	
2024–25	F	(Serbia) Filip Petrušev (2)	(Serbia) Crvena zvezda Meridianbet	
2024–25	C	(Bosnia and Herzegovina) Kenan Kamenjaš (3)	(Montenegro) Budućnost VOLI	
2025–26	G	(United States) Dwayne Bacon	(United Arab Emirates) Dubai Basketball	
2025–26	G	(Australia) Mitch Creek	(Romania) U-BT Cluj-Napoca	
2025–26	F	(Germany) Isaac Bonga	(Serbia) Partizan Mozzart Bet	
2025–26	F	(Serbia) **Bogoljub Marković**	(Serbia) Mega Superbet	
2025–26	C	(Canada) Mfiondu Kabengele	(United Arab Emirates) Dubai Basketball	

== See also ==
- ABA League MVP
- ABA League Finals MVP
- ABA League Top Scorer
- ABA League Top Prospect
- Player of the Month
