= Robert Conley (basketball) =

American basketball player (born 1977)

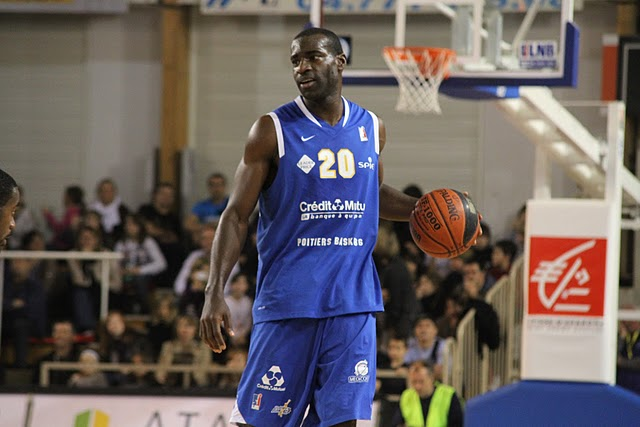

Personal information
- Born: April 30, 1977 (age 49) Decatur, Georgia, U.S.
- Listed height: 6 ft 6 in (1.98 m)
- Listed weight: 212 lb (96 kg)

Career information
- High school: Columbia (Decatur, Georgia)
- College: Clayton State (1997–1999)
- NBA draft: 1999: undrafted
- Playing career: 1999–2010
- Position: Shooting guard / small forward

Robert Conley (born April 30, 1977) is an American former professional basketball player. Standing at 1.98 m (6 ft 6 in), he played as a swingman.

== Career ==
- (Lithuania) BC Alita (1999–2000)
- (France) Brest (2000–2001)
- (Germany) Phantoms Braunschweig (2001)
- (Italy) Basket Livorno (2001–2002)
- (United States) Greenville Groove (2002)
- (Italy) Basket Livorno (2002–2003)
- (Greece) Ionikos NF (2003–2004)
- (Spain) Girona (2004)
- (Spain) TauCeramica (2004–2005)
- (Serbia) Hemofarm (2005–2006)
- (Italy) Aironi Novara (2006–2007)
- (Puerto Rico) Atléticos de San Germán (2007)
- (France) ASVEL Villeurbanne (2007–2008)
- (Israel) Maccabi Rishon LeZion (2008–2009)
- (Spain) Bilbao (2009–2010)
- (France) Poitiers (2010)
