= Tadija Dragićević =

Serbian basketball player

Personal information
- Born: 28 January 1986 (age 40) Čačak, SR Serbia, SFR Yugoslavia
- Listed height: 2.06 m (6 ft 9 in)
- Listed weight: 111 kg (245 lb)

Career information
- NBA draft: 2008: 2nd round, 53rd overall pick
- Drafted by: Utah Jazz
- Playing career: 2004–2019
- Position: Power forward
- Number: 20, 34

Career history
- 2004–2010: Crvena zvezda
- 2005–2006: →Mega Vizura
- 2010: Virtus Roma
- 2010–2011: Alba Berlin
- 2011–2012: Biella
- 2012–2013: Azovmash
- 2013: Anadolu Efes
- 2014: Crvena zvezda
- 2014–2015: Strasbourg IG
- 2015–2016: Budućnost
- 2016–2017: Aris
- 2018: Yeşilgiresun
- 2018–2019: Breogán

Career highlights
- Montenegrin League (2016); 2× Serbian Cup winner (2006, 2014); French Cup winner (2015); Montenegrin Cup winner (2016); ABA League MVP (2008); 2× ABA League Top Scorer (2008, 2016); All-ABA League Team (2016)
- Stats at Basketball Reference
Medals
Men's basketball
Representing Serbia and Montenegro
FIBA Europe Under-20 Championship
| Gold medal – first place | 2006 Turkey | Team |
| Bronze medal – third place | 2005 Russia | Team |

Tadija Dragićević (Serbian Cyrillic: Тадија Драгићевић; born 28 January 1986) is a Serbian former professional basketball player. Standing at 2.06 m (6 ft 9 in), he played the power forward position.

== Professional career ==
Dragićević grew up with the KK Crvena zvezda youth teams, and patiently improved himself as a player, until he eventually became a team captain and Adriatic League MVP at the senior level. On 22 January 2010, after five years in the club's first team, he was released from the club, due to financial difficulties that the club had fallen into.

On 25 January 2010 he signed with the Italian club Lottomatica Roma, for the rest of the season. He spent the following season playing with Alba Berlin, in the Basketball Bundesliga. In July 2011, he signed a two-year contract with the Italian club Angelico Biella. In 30 games played in the Italian League, he averaged 10.6 points and 6.4 rebounds per game.

In July 2012, he signed a one-year deal with the Ukrainian club Azovmash. In October 2013, he signed a two-month deal with the Turkish team Anadolu Efes. Later that same season, he didn't extend his contract with the team, so he was released. On 3 January 2014 he returned to his former club, Crvena zvezda, signing a contract with them for the rest of the season.

On 15 September 2014 Dragićević signed a one-year deal with the French team Strasbourg IG. On 24 September 2015 he signed with the Montenegrin team Budućnost Podgorica.

On 12 October 2016 Dragićević signed with the Greek club Aris Thessaloniki for the rest of the 2016–17 season.

On 7 January 2018 Dragićević signed with Turkish club Yeşilgiresun Belediye. On 29 December 2018 he signed with Spanish club Cafés Candelas Breogán.

=== NBA draft rights ===
Dragićević was drafted 53rd overall in the 2008 NBA draft, by the Utah Jazz. His draft rights were traded in June 2012 to the Dallas Mavericks. On 14 July 2014 Dragićević's rights were traded to the Chicago Bulls, in exchange for Greg Smith. On 22 January 2019 Dragićević's rights were traded to the Houston Rockets, in exchange for Carmelo Anthony, the rights to Jon Diebler and cash considerations. On 27 November 2020 Dragićević's draft rights were traded to the New York Knicks.

== EuroLeague career statistics ==
Legend
| GP | Games played | GS | Games started | MPG | Minutes per game |
| FG% | Field-goal percentage | 3P% | 3-point field-goal percentage | FT% | Free-throw percentage |
| RPG | Rebounds per game | APG | Assists per game | SPG | Steals per game |
| BPG | Blocks per game | PPG | Points per game | PIR | Performance index rating |
| **Bold** | Career high |

| Year | Team | GP | GS | MPG | FG% | 3P% | FT% | RPG | APG | SPG | BPG | PPG | PIR |
|---|---|---|---|---|---|---|---|---|---|---|---|---|---|
| 2013–14 | Anadolu Efes | 10 | 2 | 15.4 | .426 | .370 | .857 | 1.9 | .6 | .4 | .2 | 6.2 | 6.3 |
| Career | | 10 | 2 | 15.4 | .426 | .370 | .857 | 1.9 | .6 | .4 | .2 | 6.2 | 6.3 |

== Personal life ==
He is a twin brother of Strahinja Dragićević who is also a professional basketball player. He is also father of two sons Andrej and Maksim.

== See also ==
- List of NBA drafted players from Serbia
- Utah Jazz draft history
