= 2005–06 ABA Goodyear League =

2005–06 ABA Goodyear League season
- League: ABA Goodyear League
- Sport: Basketball
- Teams: Serbia and Montenegro (5 teams); Slovenia (4 teams); Croatia (3 teams); Bosnia and Herzegovina (2 teams)

Regular season
- Season champions: (Serbia and Montenegro) Partizan
- Season MVP: (Serbia and Montenegro) Dejan Milojević (Partizan)
- Top scorer: (Serbia and Montenegro) Dejan Milojević (Partizan) (17.68 ppg)

Final 8
- Champions: (Serbia and Montenegro) FMP Železnik
- Runners-up: Partizan

ABA Goodyear League seasons
- ← 2004–05 2006–07 →

The fifth season brought another change in the competition structure. Following the idea to make the league as strong as possible the management of the Goodyear league decided to reduce the number of clubs from 16 to 14 again.

14 teams from Slovenia, Croatia, Bosnia and Herzegovina, Serbia and Montenegro participated in Goodyear League in its fifth season: Union Olimpija, Helios, Pivovarna Laško, Geoplin Slovan, Cibona, Zadar, Zagreb, Široki ERONET, Bosna ASA BH TELECOM, Crvena zvezda, Partizan, Hemofarm, FMP Železnik, Vojvodina Srbijagas.

There were 26 rounds played in the regular part of the season, best eight teams qualified for the Final Eight Tournament which was played in Sarajevo since April 20 until April 23, 2006.

FMP Železnik became the Goodyear League Champion.

== Regular season ==
Pos	Team	Pld	W	L	PF	PA	PD	Pts	Qualification or relegation
1	Partizan	26	20	6	2189	1996	+193	46	Qualified for Final eight
2	Crvena zvezda	26	19	7	2083	1886	+197	45	Qualified for Final eight
3	FMP Železnik	26	18	8	2054	1896	+158	44	Qualified for Final eight
4	Cibona VIP	26	16	10	2133	2082	+51	42	Qualified for Final eight
5	Hemofarm	26	16	10	2066	1979	+87	42	Qualified for Final eight
6	Vojvodina Srbijagas	26	15	11	2194	2129	+65	41	Qualified for Final eight
7	Bosna ASA BHT	26	15	11	2093	2008	+85	41	Qualified for Final eight
8	Zadar	26	14	12	2182	2073	+109	40	Qualified for Final eight
9	Geoplin Slovan	26	13	13	2034	2018	+16	39	
10	Union Olimpija	26	10	16	2056	2062	−6	36	
11	Široki ERONET	26	10	16	2002	2178	−176	36	
12	Helios	26	7	19	1926	2108	−182	33	
13	Zagreb	26	5	21	1970	2231	−261	31	
14	Pivovarna Laško	26	4	22	1955	2291	−336	30	Relegated

== Stats Leaders ==
=== Points ===
Rank	Name	Team	Points	Games	PPG
1.	(Serbia) Dejan Milojević	Partizan	495	28	17,68
2.	(Slovenia) Goran Dragić	Slovan	395	26	15,19
3.	(Slovenia) Željko Zagorac	Helios	332	22	15,09
4.	(Serbia) Vanja Plisnić	Vojvodina	381	26	14,65
5.	(United States) Robert Conley	Hemofarm	363	25	14,52

=== Rebounds ===
Rank	Name	Team	Rebounds	Games	RPG
1.	(United States) Jeff McMillan	Laško	250	26	9,62
2.	(Serbia) Dejan Milojević	Partizan	245	28	8,75
3.	(North Macedonia) Todor Gečevski	Zadar	201	26	7,73
4.	(Slovenia) Željko Zagorac	Helios	158	22	7,18
5.	(Serbia) Milenko Topić	Hemofarm	184	28	6,57

=== Assists ===
Rank	Name	Team	Assists	Games	APG
1.	(Montenegro) Goran Jeretin	Crvena zvezda	96	24	4,00
2.	(Bosnia and Herzegovina) Feliks Kojadinović	Vojvodina	105	27	3,89
3.	(Israel) Yotam Halperin	Olimpija	91	25	3,64
4.	(United States) Robert Conley	Hemofarm	85	25	3,40
5.	(United States) Dean Oliver	Zadar	89	27	3,30

=== Ranking MVP ===
Rank	Name	Team	Efficiency	Games	Average
1.	(Serbia) Dejan Milojević	Partizan	734	28	26,21
2.	(North Macedonia) Todor Gečevski	Zadar	499	26	19,19
3.	(Serbia) Milenko Topić	Hemofarm	519	28	18,54
4.	(Israel) Yotam Halperin	Olimpija	441	25	17,64
5.	(United States) Robert Conley	Hemofarm	421	25	16,84

== Final eight ==
Matches played at Dvorana Mirza Delibašić, Sarajevo

Quarterfinals; April 20./21.
1	Partizan	93
8	Zadar	81
4	Cibona VIP	83
5	Hemofarm	91 ot
2	Crvena zvezda	86
7	Bosna ASA BHT	74
3	FMP Železnik	95
6	Vojvodina Srbijagas	93

Semifinals; April 22.
1	Partizan	88
5	Hemofarm	66
2	Crvena zvezda	78
3	FMP Železnik	103

Final; April 23.
1	Partizan	72
3	FMP Železnik	73

2005–06 ABA Goodyear League Champions
FMP Železnik
2nd title
