= 2010–11 ABA NLB League =

2010-11 NLB League season
- League: Liga ABA
- Sport: Basketball
- Duration: 8 October 2010 – 21 April 2011
- Games: 185
- Teams: Serbia (4 teams); Croatia (4 teams); Bosnia and Herzegovina (2 teams); Slovenia (2 teams); Montenegro (1 team); Czech Republic (1 team)

Regular season
- Season champions: (Serbia) Partizan
- Season MVP: (Croatia) Luka Žorić (Zagreb)
- Top scorer: (United States) Michael Lee (Radnički) (19.60 ppg)

Final four
- Finals champions: (Serbia) Partizan
- Runners-up: (Slovenia) Union Olimpija

NLB League seasons
- ← 2009–10 2011–12 →

The 2010–11 season was the 10th season of the Liga ABA and 14 teams from Serbia, Slovenia, Montenegro, Croatia, Bosnia and Herzegovina and Czech Republic participated in it. It was only time that team from Czech Republic, Nymburk took part in this regional league, and second time since formation that team that is not from former Yugoslavia took part in league.

2010–11 NLB League Final Four was held on 19–21 April in Arena Stožice, Ljubljana.

== Team information ==
=== Venues and locations ===
Location of teams in the ABA NLB League 2010–11
Location of teams in the 2010–11 ABA League

Country	Teams	Team	City	Venue (Capacity)
Serbia	4			
Serbia	4	Partizan	Belgrade	Pionir Hall (8,150)
Serbia	4	Hemofarm STADA	Vršac	Millennium Center (5,000)
Serbia	4	Crvena zvezda	Belgrade	Pionir Hall (8,150)
Serbia	4	Radnički	Kragujevac	Hala Jezero (3,570)
Croatia	4			
Croatia	4	Cibona	Zagreb	Dražen Petrović Basketball Hall (5,400)
Croatia	4	Zadar	Zadar	Krešimir Ćosić Hall (9,200)
Croatia	4	Zagreb CO	Zagreb	Dražen Petrović Basketball Hall (5,400)
Croatia	4	Cedevita	Zagreb	Sutinska vrela (2,000)
Slovenia	2			
Slovenia	2	Union Olimpija	Ljubljana	Arena Stožice (12,480)
Slovenia	2	Krka	Novo Mesto	Leon Štukelj Hall (3,000)
Bosnia and Herzegovina	2			
Bosnia and Herzegovina	2	Igokea	Aleksandrovac	Laktaši Sports Hall (3,000)
Bosnia and Herzegovina	2	Široki TT Kabeli	Široki Brijeg	"Pecara" (4,500)
Montenegro	1			
Montenegro	1	Budućnost m:tel	Podgorica	Morača Sports Center (4,570)
Czech Republic	1			
Czech Republic	1	ČEZ Nymburk	Nymburk	Sportovní Hala (1,200)

=== Head coaches ===
Team	Head coach	Seasons as head coach
Budućnost m:tel	(Montenegro) Dejan Radonjić	6
Cedevita	(Croatia) Aleksandar Petrović	2
Cibona	(Croatia) Zdravko Radulović	1
Crvena zvezda	(Serbia) Mihailo Uvalin	1
Hemofarm STADA	(Serbia) Željko Lukajić	9
Igokea	(Serbia) Slobodan Klipa	1
Krka	(Serbia) Aleksandar Džikić	2
ČEZ Nymburk	(Israel) Ronen Ginzburg	1
Union Olimpija	(Slovenia) Jure Zdovc	3
Partizan	(Serbia) Vlada Jovanović	1
Radnički	(Serbia) Miroslav Nikolić	2
Zadar	(Croatia) Danijel Jusup	6
Zagreb CO	(Croatia) Denis Bajramović	3
Široki TT Kabeli	(Bosnia and Herzegovina) Ivan Velić	2

=== Coaching changes ===
Week	Club	Outgoing coach	Date of vacancy	Incoming coach	Date of appointment
8th	Zagreb	(Croatia) Denis Bajramović	24 November 2010	(Croatia) Mladen Erjavec	25 November 2010
13th	Cibona	(Montenegro) Zdravko Radulović	30 December 2010	(Croatia) Dražen Anzulović	30 December 2010
16th	Zadar	(Croatia) Danijel Jusup	12 January 2011	(Croatia) Tihomir Bujan	12 January 2011
22nd	Zadar	(Croatia) Tihomir Bujan	2 March 2011	(Croatia) Pino Grdović	3 March 2011

== Regular season ==
The regular season began on Friday, 8 October 2010, and will end on Tuesday, 15 March 2011.

=== Standings ===
Pos	Team	Pld	W	L	PF	PA	PD	Pts	Qualification or relegation
1	(Serbia) Partizan	26	18	8	2074	1796	+278	44	Qualified for Final four
2	(Slovenia) Union Olimpija	26	17	9	2005	1881	+124	43	Qualified for Final four
3	(Slovenia) Krka	26	17	9	1996	1867	+129	43	Qualified for Final four
4	(Montenegro) Budućnost m:tel	26	15	11	2009	1927	+82	41	Qualified for Final four
5	(Croatia) Zagreb CO	26	15	11	2141	2104	+37	41	
6	(Serbia) Hemofarm STADA	26	14	12	2057	2050	+7	40	
7	(Croatia) Cedevita	26	14	12	2124	2068	+56	40	
8	(Czech Republic) ČEZ Nymburk	26	12	14	2024	2069	−45	38	
9	(Bosnia and Herzegovina) Široki TT Kabeli	26	12	14	1981	2124	−143	38	
10	(Serbia) Radnički	26	12	14	2098	2187	−89	38	
11	(Bosnia and Herzegovina) Igokea	26	11	15	1928	1960	−32	37	
12	(Croatia) Cibona	26	10	16	1990	2101	−111	36	
13	(Serbia) Crvena zvezda	26	8	18	1994	2135	−141	34	
14	(Croatia) Zadar	26	7	19	1983	2135	−152	33	Relegated

Updated to match(es) played on 2011. Source:

=== Schedule and results ===
1. round
Partizan – Budućnost	78–79
Hemofarm – Cibona	86–80
Široki – Krka	62–72
Cedevita – Zadar	70–66
Olimpija – Igokea	61–54
Zagreb – Radnički	82–76
Nymburk – Crvena Zvezda	94–73

2. round
Budućnost – Crvena Zvezda	89–75
Radnički – Nymburk	82–87
Igokea – Zagreb	70–79
Zadar – Olimpija	66–72
Krka – Cedevita	77–81
Cibona – Široki	83–72
Partizan – Hemofarm	77–66

3. round
Hemofarm – Budućnost	88–76
Široki – Partizan	86–79
Cedevita – Cibona	70–68
Olimpija – Krka	60–59
Zagreb – Zadar	65–63
Nymburk – Igokea	70–65
Crvena Zvezda – Radnički	83–85

4. round
Budućnost – Radnički	95–61
Igokea – Crvena Zvezda	77–59
Zadar – Nymburk	73–60
Krka – Zagreb	65–63
Cibona – Olimpija	84–81
Partizan – Cedevita	80–72
Hemofarm – Široki	92–82

5. round
Široki – Budućnost	69–61
Cedevita – Hemofarm	89–97
Olimpija – Partizan	75–73
Zagreb – Cibona	77–87
Nymburk – Krka	57–77
Crvena Zvezda – Zadar	76–89
Radnički – Igokea	71–78

6. round
Budućnost – Igokea	84–67
Zadar – Radnički	86–96
Krka – Crvena Zvezda	89–76
Cibona – Nymburk	85–86
Partizan – Zagreb	84–64
Hemofarm – Olimpija	84–74
Široki – Cedevita	77–73

7. round
Cedevita – Budućnost	70–59
Olimpija – Široki	107–70
Zagreb – Hemofarm	76–73
Nymburk – Partizan	73–69
Crvena Zvezda – Cibona	83–72
Radnički – Krka	86–82
Igokea – Zadar	78–75

8. round
Budućnost – Zadar	105–92
Krka – Igokea	79–66
Cibona – Radnički	88–82
Partizan – Crvena Zvezda	99–68
Hemofarm – Nymburk	86–85
Široki – Zagreb	83–76
Cedevita – Olimpija	95–57

9. round
Olimpija – Budućnost	68–53
Zagreb – Cedevita	83–74
Široki – Nymburk	94–80
Crvena Zvezda – Hemofarm	77–73
Radnički – Partizan	89–85
Igokea – Cibona	76–62
Zadar – Krka	94-100

10. round
Budućnost – Krka	68–63
Cibona – Zadar	84–81
Partizan – Igokea	77–72
Hemofarm – Radnički	78–88
Široki – Crvena Zvezda	78–75
Cedevita – Nymburk	80–78
Olimpija – Zagreb	75–82

11. round
Zagreb – Budućnost	75–85
Nymburk – Olimpija	72–85
Crvena Zvezda – Cedevita	82–77
Radnički – Široki	92–82
Igokea – Hemofarm	99–82
Zadar – Partizan	91–88
Krka – Cibona	87–64

12. round
Budućnost – Cibona	80–71
Partizan – Krka	75–50
Hemofarm – Zadar	74–88
Široki – Igokea	76–72
Cedevita – Radnički	98–87
Olimpija – Crvena Zvezda	80–67
Zagreb – Nymburk	92–84

13. round
Nymburk – Budućnost	74–87
Crvena Zvezda – Zagreb	89–82
Radnički – Olimpija	74 -93
Igokea – Cedevita	80–89
Zadar – Široki	74 -80
Krka – Hemofarm	90–70
Cibona – Partizan	55–85

14. round
Budućnost – Partizan	61–65
Cibona – Hemofarm	74–84
Krka – Široki	78–72
Zadar – Cedevita	87–81
Igokea – Olimpija	85–74
Radnički – Zagreb	97–92
Crvena Zvezda – Nymburk	82–99

15. round
Crvena Zvezda – Budućnost	63–55
Nymburk – Radnički	97–94
Zagreb – Igokea	85–77
Olimpija – Zadar	78–53
Cedevita – Krka	74–80
Široki – Cibona	81–82
Hemofarm – Partizan	64–71

16. round
Budućnost – Hemofarm	75–73
Partizan – Široki	93–43
Cibona – Cedevita	73–71
Krka – Olimpija	75–80
Zadar – Zagreb	71–81
Igokea – Nymburk	82–70
Radnički – Crvena Zvezda	82–69

17. round
Radnički – Budućnost	75–68
Crvena Zvezda – Igokea	72–81
Nymburk – Zadar	91–70
Zagreb – Krka	104–82
Olimpija – Cibona	75–84
Cedevita – Partizan	88–84
Široki – Hemofarm	84–90

18. round
Budućnost – Široki	86–64
Hemofarm – Cedevita	76–81
Partizan – Olimpija	61–50
Cibona – Zagreb	83–99
Krka – Nymburk	72–50
Zadar – Crvena Zvezda	60–83
Igokea – Radnički	77–60

19. round
Igokea – Budućnost	80–70
Radnički – Zadar	97–89
Crvena Zvezda – Krka	77–79
Nymburk – Cibona	76–69
Zagreb – Partizan	69–77
Olimpija – Hemofarm	104–62
Cedevita – Široki	95–77

20. round
Budućnost – Cedevita	93–90
Široki – Olimpija	86–85
Hemofarm – Zagreb	98–81
Partizan – Nymburk	86–75
Cibona – Crvena Zvezda	86–78
Krka – Radnički	88–73
Zadar – Igokea	89–65

21. round
Zadar – Budućnost	74–78
Igokea – Krka	66–78
Radnički – Cibona	89–79
Crvena Zvezda – Partizan	68–76
Nymburk – Hemofarm	66–71
Zagreb – Široki	86–80
Olimpija – Cedevita	75–67

22. round
Budućnost – Olimpija	70–71
Cedevita – Zagreb	97-102
Nymburk – Široki	73–59
Hemofarm – Crvena Zvezda	88–66
Partizan – Radnički	80–64
Cibona – Igokea	78–68
Krka – Zadar	92–64

23. round
Krka – Budućnost	80–73
Zadar – Cibona	93–88
Igokea – Partizan	88–86
Radnički – Hemofarm	66–59
Crvena Zvezda – Široki	81–70
Nymburk – Cedevita	90–86
Zagreb – Olimpija	85–89

24. round
Budućnost – Zagreb	77–80
Olimpija – Nymburk	74–63
Cedevita – Crvena Zvezda	98–95
Široki – Radnički	103–94
Hemofarm – Igokea	82–62
Partizan – Zadar	85–50
Cibona – Krka	67–72

25. round
Cibona – Budućnost	70–80
Krka – Partizan	62–72
Zadar – Hemofarm	71–88
Igokea – Široki	71–73
Radnički – Cedevita	73–79
Crvena Zvezda – Olimpija	92–70
Nymburk – Zagreb	83–74

26. round
Budućnost – Nymburk	102–91
Zagreb – Crvena Zvezda	107–85
Olimpija – Radnički	92–65
Cedevita – Igokea	79–72
Široki – Zadar	80–74
Hemofarm – Krka	73–68
Partizan – Cibona	89–74

== Stats leaders ==
As of 21 April 2011

=== Points ===
Rank	Name	Team	Points	Games	PPG
1.	(United States) Michael Lee	(Serbia) Radnički	490	25	19.60
2.	(Croatia) Luka Žorić	(Croatia) Zagreb	505	26	19.42
3.	(Croatia) Bojan Bogdanović	(Croatia) Cibona	454	24	18.92
4.	(United States) Corsley Edwards	(Croatia) Cedevita	367	21	17.48
5.	(United States) Dontaye Draper	(Croatia) Cedevita	439	26	16.88

=== Rebounds ===
Rank	Name	Team	Rebounds	Games	RPG
1.	(Croatia) Luka Žorić	(Croatia) Zagreb	213	26	8.19
2.	(Montenegro) Vladimir Dragičević	(Montenegro) Budućnost	188	27	6.96
3.	(Czech Republic) Radek Nečas	(Czech Republic) Nymburk	148	23	6.43
4.	(Croatia) Mario Kasun	(Croatia) Zagreb	135	21	6.43
5.	(United States) James Gist	(Serbia) Partizan	140	23	6.09

=== Assists ===
Rank	Name	Team	Assists	Games	APG
1.	(Serbia) Miljan Pavković	(Serbia) Hemofarm	135	26	5.19
2.	(United States) Dontaye Draper	(Croatia) Cedevita	132	26	5.08
3.	(Australia) Steven Marković	(Serbia) Radnički	127	26	4.88
4.	(Croatia) Vedran Morović	(Bosnia and Herzegovina) Široki	107	25	4.28
5.	(United States) Brian Chase	(Bosnia and Herzegovina) Igokea	95	24	3.96

=== Ranking MVP ===
Rank	Name	Team	Efficiency	Games	Average
1.	(Croatia) Luka Žorić	(Croatia) Zagreb	614	26	23.62
2.	(United States) Dontaye Draper	(Croatia) Cedevita	552	26	21.23
3.	(United States) Michael Lee	(Serbia) Radnički	509	25	20.36
4.	(Montenegro) Vladimir Dragičević	(Montenegro) Budućnost	519	27	19.81
5.	(United States) Corsley Edwards	(Croatia) Cedevita	392	21	18.67

=== MVP Round by Round ===
Round	Player	Team	Efficiency
1	(Serbia) Milan Mačvan	(Serbia) Hemofarm	33
2	(Croatia) Bojan Bogdanović	(Croatia) Cibona	29
3	(United States) Michael Lee	(Serbia) Radnički	34
4	(Croatia) Bojan Bogdanović(2)	(Croatia) Cibona	39
5	(United States) Dontaye Draper	(Croatia) Cedevita	38
6	(Serbia) Milan Mačvan (2)	(Serbia) Hemofarm	33
7	(Serbia) Čedomir Vitkovac	(Bosnia and Herzegovina) Igokea	28
8	(Croatia) Luka Žorić	(Croatia) Zagreb	42
9	(United States) Michael Lee (2)	(Serbia) Radnički	31
10	(United States) Michael Lee (3)	(Serbia) Radnički	34
11	(Australia) Steven Marković	(Serbia) Radnički	38
12	(Croatia) Luka Žorić (2)	(Croatia) Zagreb	39
13	(United States) Corsley Edwards	(Croatia) Cedevita	38
14	(Croatia) Marko Car	(Croatia) Zadar	36
15	(United States) Chester Simmons	(Czech Republic) Nymburk	33
16	(United States) Corsley Edwards (2)	(Croatia) Cedevita	48
17	(Serbia) Boris Savović	(Serbia) Hemofarm	44
18	(Croatia) Luka Žorić (3)	(Croatia) Zagreb	31
19	(Serbia) Vladan Vukosavljević	(Serbia) Radnički	31
20	(United States) Bracey Wright	(Croatia) Cedevita	40
21	(Croatia) Luka Žorić (4)	(Croatia) Zagreb	35
22	(Croatia) Luka Žorić (5)	(Croatia) Zagreb	37
23	(Croatia) Luka Žorić (6)	(Croatia) Zagreb	40
24	(Croatia) Mario Kasun	(Croatia) Zagreb	36
25	(Montenegro) Vladimir Dragičević	(Montenegro) Budućnost	33
26	(Croatia) Mario Kasun (2)	(Croatia) Zagreb	36
Semifinals	(Slovenia) Zoran Dragić	(Slovenia) Krka	18
Final	(Australia) Nathan Jawai	(Serbia) Partizan	19

Source: NLB League

== Final four ==
Matches in, Arena Stožice, Ljubljana, Slovenia

Semifinals; 19 April
1	(Serbia) Partizan	62
4	(Montenegro) Budućnost m:tel	58
2	(Slovenia) Union Olimpija	67
3	(Slovenia) Krka	57

Final; 21 April
1	(Serbia) Partizan	77
2	(Slovenia) Union Olimpija	74

=== Semifinals ===
19 April
18:15

Report

Partizan (Serbia)	62–58	(Montenegro) Budućnost m:tel
Scoring by quarter: 14–16, 16–13, 7–16, 25–13
Pts: Jerrells, Katić 13; Rebs: Gist 6 Asts: Gist 2		Pts: Simonović 14; Rebs: Simonović 8 Asts: Kadžiulis 3

Arena Stožice, Ljubljana
Attendance: 4,000
Referees: Dubravko Muhvić (CRO), Sašo Pukl (SLO), Matej Boltauzer (SLO)

19 April
20:45

Report

Union Olimpija (Slovenia)	67–57	(Slovenia) Krka
Scoring by quarter: 14–11, 16–17, 22–15, 15–14
Pts: Ožbolt 19; Rebs: Jagodnik 10; Asts: Ilievski 4		Pts: Dragić 13; Rebs: Pavič, Balažič 5 Asts: Krivec 3

Arena Stožice, Ljubljana
Attendance: 7,000
Referees: Ilija Belošević (SRB), Zoran Šutulović (MNE), Milija Vojinović (SRB)

=== Final ===
21 April
20:45

Report

Partizan (Serbia)	77–74	(Slovenia) Union Olimpija
Scoring by quarter: 26–23, 17–16, 22–19, 12–16
Pts: Jerrells 20; Rebs: Jawai, Veselý 6 Asts: Lučić, Kecman 2		Pts: Ilievski 15; Rebs: Jagodnik 7 Asts: Ožbolt, Ilievski 3

Arena Stožice, Ljubljana
Attendance: 12,000
Referees: Srđan Dožai (CRO), Sreten Radović (CRO), Siniša Herceg (CRO)

2010–11 ABA NLB League Champions
(Serbia)
Partizan
5th title
