= 2021 ABA League First Division Playoffs =

2021 ABA League First Division Basketball Playoffs

Tournament details
- Dates: 3–28 May 2021
- Season: 2020–21
- Teams: 4
- Defending champions: (Serbia) Crvena zvezda mts

Final positions
- Champions: (Serbia) Crvena zvezda mts (5th title)
- Runners-up: (Montenegro) Budućnost VOLI
- Semifinalists: (Montenegro) Mornar; (Bosnia and Herzegovina) Igokea

Awards
- Best player: (Cameroon) Landry Nnoko

The 2021 ABA League First Division Playoffs will be the play-off tournament that decides the winner of the 2020–21 ABA League First Division season.

== Qualified teams ==
Round	Team	Ref.
24	(Montenegro) Budućnost VOLI	
24	(Serbia) Crvena zvezda mts	
25	(Bosnia and Herzegovina) Igokea	
26	(Montenegro) Mornar	

== Bracket ==
Semifinals
1 (Serbia) Crvena zvezda mts	2
4 (Bosnia and Herzegovina) Igokea	1
2 (Montenegro) Budućnost VOLI	2
3 (Montenegro) Mornar	0

Finals
1 (Serbia) Crvena zvezda mts	3
2 (Montenegro) Budućnost VOLI	2

== Semifinals ==
Team 1	Series	Team 2	Game 1	Game 2	Game 3
Crvena zvezda mts (Serbia)	2–1	(Bosnia and Herzegovina) Igokea	76–61	68–81	76–53
Budućnost VOLI (Montenegro)	2–0	(Montenegro) Mornar	97–88	92–81	—

=== Game 1 ===
==== Crvena zvezda v Igokea ====
3 May 2021	Crvena zvezda mts (Serbia)	76–61 (Series: 1–0)	(Bosnia and Herzegovina) Igokea	Belgrade
18:30	Scoring by quarter: 20–20, 19–22, 17–13, 20–6
Arena Sport	Pts: Loyd 21; Rebs: Dobrić, Nnoko 9 Asts: three players 3 PIR: Walden 20	Boxscore	Pts: Atić 15; Rebs: Jovanović 5 Asts: Carmichael 5 PIR: Atić 16	Arena: Aleksandar Nikolić Hall; Referees: Saša Pukl, Miloš Koljenšić, Mario Majkić

Starters:			Pts	Reb	Ast
G	2	(United States) Corey Walden	13	4	3
SG	3	(United States) Jordan Loyd	21	1	1
G/F	10	(Serbia) Branko Lazić	10	1	0
G/F	7	(Serbia) Dejan Davidovac	7	4	3
C	35	(Cameroon) Landry Nnoko	4	9	0
Reserves:					
PG	1	(United States) Langston Hall	6	4	2
PG	4	(Serbia) Aleksa Uskoković	0	0	0
F/C	11	(Australia) Duop Reath	0	0	0
SG	12	(Serbia) Aleksa Radanov	DNP		
G/F	13	(Serbia) Ognjen Dobrić	12	9	0
F	19	(Serbia) Marko Simonović	2	3	3
C	32	(Serbia) Ognjen Kuzmić	1	3	1
Head coach:
(Basketball Federation of Montenegro) Dejan Radonjić

Crvena zvezda	Igokea

CZV	Statistics	IGO
18/33 (54.5%)	2-pt field goals	13/32 (40.6%)
9/21 (42.9%)	3-pt field goals	9/29 (31%)
13/19 (68.4%)	Free throws	8/12 (66.7%)
12	Offensive rebounds	10
26	Defensive rebounds	14
38	Total rebounds	24
13	Assists	20
12	Turnovers	11
2	Steals	8
3 (2)	Blocks	2 (3)
18 (22)	Fouls	22 (18)

Starters:			Pts	Reb	Ast
PG	5	(Kazakhstan) Anthony Clemmons	6	2	3
G/F	7	(Bosnia and Herzegovina) Edin Atić	15	2	4
F	16	(Serbia) Marko Jošilo	8	1	1
SF	22	(Serbia) Dalibor Ilić	4	3	1
F/C	32	(United States) Jackie Carmichael	7	4	5
Reserves:					
G	4	(Serbia) Milan Vulić	DNP		
F/C	8	(Serbia) Nikola Jovanović	9	5	1
SG	9	(United States) Steven Gray	6	1	0
PG	19	(Bosnia and Herzegovina) Darko Talić	0	1	3
PG	23	(Serbia) Stefan Pot	6	2	1
F/C	42	(Serbia) Stefan Fundić	0	3	1
PG	77	(Bosnia and Herzegovina) Kosta Kondić	DNP		
Head coach:
(Basketball Federation of Bosnia and Herzegovina) Dragan Bajić

==== Budućnost v Mornar ====
3 May 2021	Budućnost VOLI (Montenegro)	97–88 (Series: 1–0)	(Montenegro) Mornar	Podgorica
21:00	Scoring by quarter: 28–31, 24–20, 25–18, 20–19
Arena Sport	Pts: Cobbs 22; Rebs: Mitrović 7 Asts: Cobbs, Ivanović 7 PIR: Cobbs 34	Boxscore	Pts: Pullen 24; Rebs: Smith 7 Asts: Needham, Pullen 5 PIR: Pullen 19	Arena: Morača Sports Center; Referees: Damir Javor, Milivoje Jovčić, Uroš Obrknežević

Starters:			Pts	Reb	Ast
SG	44	(Montenegro) Fedor Žugić	0	1	0
G/F	4	(Montenegro) Suad Šehović	0	0	0
SF	3	(Canada) Melvin Ejim	10	2	1
PF	9	(Serbia) Luka Mitrović	4	7	1
C	33	(United States) Willie Reed	13	6	0
Reserves:					
PG	1	(Montenegro) Justin Cobbs	22	4	7
PG	2	(Montenegro) Nikola Ivanović	18	3	7
PF	7	(Montenegro) Danilo Nikolić	11	6	0
F/C	8	(Serbia) Dragan Apić	DNP		
SG	11	(Italy) Amedeo Della Valle	7	4	0
C	19	(Montenegro) Zoran Nikolić	2	2	0
G	30	(Montenegro) Petar Popović	10	1	0
Head coach:
(Basketball Federation of Serbia) Dejan Milojević

Budućnost	Mornar

BUD	Statistics	MOR
23/39 (59%)	2-pt field goals	24/49 (49%)
10/25 (40%)	3-pt field goals	8/16 (50%)
21/31 (67.7%)	Free throws	16/21 (76.2%)
9	Offensive rebounds	7
27	Defensive rebounds	23
36	Total rebounds	30
16	Assists	14
9	Turnovers	9
5	Steals	2
4 (1)	Blocks	1 (4)
20 (28)	Fouls	28 (20)

Starters:			Pts	Reb	Ast
PG	0	(Georgia (country)) Jacob Pullen	24	0	5
PG	5	(Montenegro) Derek Needham	12	2	5
SG	8	(Montenegro) Sead Šehović	0	1	0
PF	2	(United States) Kenny Gabriel	2	3	0
C	55	(Serbia) Uroš Luković	9	2	0
Reserves:					
SG	6	(Serbia) Marko Jeremić	3	2	0
PG	7	(Bosnia and Herzegovina) Nemanja Gordić	6	1	1
F/C	9	(United States) Taylor Smith	8	7	2
PG	11	(United States) Isaiah Whitehead	12	3	1
F	13	(Bosnia and Herzegovina) Aleksandar Lazić	0	4	0
SG	41	(Montenegro) Nemanja Vranješ	0	0	0
F/C	51	(Montenegro) Milko Bjelica	12	5	0
Head coach:
(Basketball Federation of Montenegro) Mihailo Pavićević

=== Game 2 ===
==== Igokea v Crvena zvezda ====
7 May 2021	Igokea (Bosnia and Herzegovina)	81–68 (Series: 1–1)	(Serbia) Crvena zvezda mts	Laktaši
18:30	Scoring by quarter: 23–13, 22–18, 20–17, 16–20
Arena Sport	Pts: Clemmons 18; Rebs: Ilić 6 Asts: four players 2 PIR: Clemmons, Pot 19	Boxscore	Pts: Dobrić 17; Rebs: Nnoko 8 Asts: Walden 6 PIR: Davidovac 15	Arena: Laktaši Sports Hall; Referees: Sreten Radović, Tomislav Hordov, Igor Dragojević

Starters:			Pts	Reb	Ast
PG	5	(Kazakhstan) Anthony Clemmons	18	1	2
G/F	7	(Bosnia and Herzegovina) Edin Atić	17	2	1
F	16	(Serbia) Marko Jošilo	9	2	1
SF	22	(Serbia) Dalibor Ilić	6	6	2
F/C	32	(United States) Jackie Carmichael	0	3	2
Reserves:					
G	4	(Serbia) Milan Vulić	DNP		
F/C	8	(Serbia) Nikola Jovanović	2	2	1
SG	9	(United States) Steven Gray	11	2	1
PG	19	(Bosnia and Herzegovina) Darko Talić	4	0	1
PG	23	(Serbia) Stefan Pot	14	4	2
F/C	42	(Serbia) Stefan Fundić	0	1	0
PG	77	(Bosnia and Herzegovina) Kosta Kondić	0	0	0
Head coach:
(Basketball Federation of Bosnia and Herzegovina) Dragan Bajić

Igokea	Crvena zvezda

IGO	Statistics	CZV
13/24 (54.2%)	2-pt field goals	16/35 (45.7%)
11/21 (52.4%)	3-pt field goals	7/23 (30.4%)
22/29 (75.9%)	Free throws	15/20 (75%)
3	Offensive rebounds	10
20	Defensive rebounds	14
23	Total rebounds	24
13	Assists	11
12	Turnovers	12
7	Steals	4
2 (2)	Blocks	2 (2)
26 (23)	Fouls	25 (26)

Starters:			Pts	Reb	Ast
G	2	(United States) Corey Walden	2	4	6
SG	3	(United States) Jordan Loyd	11	1	1
G/F	10	(Serbia) Branko Lazić	2	1	0
G/F	7	(Serbia) Dejan Davidovac	12	3	0
C	35	(Cameroon) Landry Nnoko	7	8	0
Reserves:					
PG	1	(United States) Langston Hall	2	0	3
PG	4	(Serbia) Aleksa Uskoković	DNP		
F/C	11	(Australia) Duop Reath	2	3	0
SG	12	(Serbia) Aleksa Radanov	0	0	0
G/F	13	(Serbia) Ognjen Dobrić	17	2	1
F	19	(Serbia) Marko Simonović	11	0	0
C	32	(Serbia) Ognjen Kuzmić	2	2	0
Head coach:
(Basketball Federation of Montenegro) Dejan Radonjić

==== Mornar v Budućnost ====
7 May 2021	Mornar (Montenegro)	81–92 (Series: 0–2)	(Montenegro) Budućnost VOLI	Bar
21:00	Scoring by quarter: 20–27, 30–25, 17–27, 14–13
Arena Sport	Pts: Needham 16; Rebs: Smith 6 Asts: Pullen 5 PIR: Smith 16	Boxscore	Pts: Cobbs 21; Rebs: Mitrović, Reed 9 Asts: Ivanović 7 PIR: Cobbs 28	Arena: Topolica Sport Hall; Attendance: 500; Referees: Ilija Belošević, Uroš Nikolić, Josip Radojković

Starters:			Pts	Reb	Ast
PG	0	(Georgia (country)) Jacob Pullen	10	1	5
PG	5	(Montenegro) Derek Needham	16	4	4
SG	6	(Serbia) Marko Jeremić	7	3	0
PF	2	(United States) Kenny Gabriel	6	3	1
C	55	(Serbia) Uroš Luković	4	3	0
Reserves:					
PG	7	(Bosnia and Herzegovina) Nemanja Gordić	0	4	1
SG	8	(Montenegro) Sead Šehović	DNP		
F/C	9	(United States) Taylor Smith	12	6	0
PG	11	(United States) Isaiah Whitehead	6	2	2
F	13	(Bosnia and Herzegovina) Aleksandar Lazić	7	4	1
SG	41	(Montenegro) Nemanja Vranješ	11	5	0
F/C	51	(Montenegro) Milko Bjelica	2	2	1
Head coach:
(Basketball Federation of Montenegro) Mihailo Pavićević

Mornar	Budućnost

MOR	Statistics	BUD
16/43 (37.2%)	2-pt field goals	20/41 (48.8%)
10/26 (38.5%)	3-pt field goals	11/24 (45.8%)
19/24 (79.2%)	Free throws	19/29 (65.5%)
10	Offensive rebounds	11
27	Defensive rebounds	31
37	Total rebounds	42
15	Assists	14
9	Turnovers	9
7	Steals	7
4 (6)	Blocks	6 (4)
28 (22)	Fouls	22 (27)

Starters:			Pts	Reb	Ast
PG	1	(Montenegro) Justin Cobbs	21	4	3
SG	44	(Montenegro) Fedor Žugić	0	0	0
SF	3	(Canada) Melvin Ejim	2	4	1
PF	9	(Serbia) Luka Mitrović	9	9	1
C	33	(United States) Willie Reed	14	9	0
Reserves:					
PG	2	(Montenegro) Nikola Ivanović	10	4	7
G/F	4	(Montenegro) Suad Šehović	0	0	0
PF	7	(Montenegro) Danilo Nikolić	8	4	0
F/C	8	(Serbia) Dragan Apić	0	0	0
SG	11	(Italy) Amedeo Della Valle	17	3	1
C	19	(Montenegro) Zoran Nikolić	2	4	0
G	30	(Montenegro) Petar Popović	9	1	1
Head coach:
(Basketball Federation of Serbia) Dejan Milojević

=== Game 3 ===
==== Crvena zvezda v Igokea ====
11 May 2021	Crvena zvezda mts (Serbia)	76–53 (Series: 2–1)	(Bosnia and Herzegovina) Igokea	Belgrade
18:30	Scoring by quarter: 24–12, 24–23, 9–16, 19–2
Arena Sport	Pts: Davidovac 22; Rebs: Davidovac 8 Asts: Loyd 5 PIR: Davidovac 33	Boxscore	Pts: Clemmons 15; Rebs: Jošilo 6 Asts: Atić 4 PIR: Clemmons 19	Arena: Aleksandar Nikolić Hall; Attendance: 383; Referees: Ilija Belošević, Matej Boltauzer, Sašo Petek

Starters:			Pts	Reb	Ast
G	2	(United States) Corey Walden	7	1	4
SG	3	(United States) Jordan Loyd	15	5	5
G/F	10	(Serbia) Branko Lazić	0	0	0
F	19	(Serbia) Marko Simonović	2	2	0
C	35	(Cameroon) Landry Nnoko	11	7	0
Reserves:					
PG	1	(United States) Langston Hall	4	1	1
PG	4	(Serbia) Aleksa Uskoković	0	0	0
G/F	7	(Serbia) Dejan Davidovac	22	8	3
F/C	11	(Australia) Duop Reath	0	1	0
SG	12	(Serbia) Aleksa Radanov	2	1	0
G/F	13	(Serbia) Ognjen Dobrić	11	1	2
C	32	(Serbia) Ognjen Kuzmić	2	3	0
Head coach:
(Basketball Federation of Montenegro) Dejan Radonjić

Crvena zvezda	Igokea

CZV	Statistics	IGO
16/37 (43.2%)	2-pt field goals	16/31 (51.6%)
10/24 (41.7%)	3-pt field goals	4/20 (20%)
14/16 (87.5%)	Free throws	9/20 (45%)
8	Offensive rebounds	4
22	Defensive rebounds	23
30	Total rebounds	27
15	Assists	15
10	Turnovers	12
8	Steals	7
2 (3)	Blocks	3 (2)
25 (19)	Fouls	19 (24)

Starters:			Pts	Reb	Ast
PG	5	(Kazakhstan) Anthony Clemmons	15	3	3
G/F	7	(Bosnia and Herzegovina) Edin Atić	1	5	4
F	16	(Serbia) Marko Jošilo	6	6	2
SF	22	(Serbia) Dalibor Ilić	5	4	1
F/C	32	(United States) Jackie Carmichael	12	3	0
Reserves:					
G	4	(Serbia) Milan Vulić	DNP		
F/C	8	(Serbia) Nikola Jovanović	7	3	0
SG	9	(United States) Steven Gray	3	1	0
PG	19	(Bosnia and Herzegovina) Darko Talić	0	2	3
PG	23	(Serbia) Stefan Pot	2	0	2
F/C	42	(Serbia) Stefan Fundić	2	0	0
PG	77	(Bosnia and Herzegovina) Kosta Kondić	DNP		
Head coach:
(Basketball Federation of Bosnia and Herzegovina) Dragan Bajić

== Finals ==
Team 1	Series	Team 2	Game 1	Game 2	Game 3	Game 4	Game 5
Crvena zvezda mts (Serbia)	3–2	(Montenegro) Budućnost VOLI	82–78	85–79	71–75	80–81	67–60

=== Game 1 ===
16 May 2021	Crvena zvezda mts (Serbia)	82–78 (Series: 1–0)	(Montenegro) Budućnost VOLI	Belgrade
18:30	Scoring by quarter: 20–20, 24–18, 19–17, 19–23
Arena Sport	Pts: Dobrić, Loyd 23; Rebs: Kuzmić 11; Asts: Hall 7 PIR: Loyd 23	Boxscore	Pts: Reed 26; Rebs: Reed 10; Asts: Ivanović 10; PIR: Reed 35	Arena: Aleksandar Nikolić Hall; Attendance: 987; Referees: Saša Pukl, Tomislav Hordov, Josip Radojković

Starters:			Pts	Reb	Ast
PG	1	(United States) Langston Hall	4	2	7
SG	3	(United States) Jordan Loyd	23	6	5
G/F	10	(Serbia) Branko Lazić	6	4	1
G/F	7	(Serbia) Dejan Davidovac	12	3	1
C	35	(Cameroon) Landry Nnoko	4	4	0
Reserves:					
PG	4	(Serbia) Aleksa Uskoković	0	1	2
F/C	11	(Australia) Duop Reath	5	2	0
SG	12	(Serbia) Aleksa Radanov	DNP		
G/F	13	(Serbia) Ognjen Dobrić	23	6	1
F	19	(Serbia) Marko Simonović	0	0	0
PF	21	(Serbia) Marko Jagodić-Kuridža	DNP		
C	32	(Serbia) Ognjen Kuzmić	5	11	0
Head coach:
(Basketball Federation of Montenegro) Dejan Radonjić

Crvena zvezda	Budućnost

CZV	Statistics	BUD
25/49 (51%)	2-pt field goals	21/40 (52.5%)
5/26 (19.2%)	3-pt field goals	5/12 (41.7%)
17/22 (77.3%)	Free throws	21/30 (70%)
18	Offensive rebounds	7
21	Defensive rebounds	26
39	Total rebounds	33
17	Assists	18
13	Turnovers	17
10	Steals	8
1 (1)	Blocks	1 (1)
28 (26)	Fouls	27 (28)

Starters:			Pts	Reb	Ast
PG	1	(Montenegro) Justin Cobbs	8	6	4
SG	44	(Montenegro) Fedor Žugić	0	1	0
SF	3	(Canada) Melvin Ejim	0	1	1
PF	9	(Serbia) Luka Mitrović	6	3	1
C	33	(United States) Willie Reed	26	10	1
Reserves:					
PG	2	(Montenegro) Nikola Ivanović	16	2	10
G/F	4	(Montenegro) Suad Šehović	0	0	0
PF	7	(Montenegro) Danilo Nikolić	7	7	0
F/C	8	(Serbia) Dragan Apić	DNP		
SG	11	(Italy) Amedeo Della Valle	6	1	1
C	19	(Montenegro) Zoran Nikolić	2	1	0
G	30	(Montenegro) Petar Popović	7	1	0
Head coach:
(Basketball Federation of Serbia) Dejan Milojević

=== Game 2 ===
18 May 2021	Crvena zvezda mts (Serbia)	85–79 (Series: 2–0)	(Montenegro) Budućnost VOLI	Belgrade
20:30	Scoring by quarter: 30–17, 25–24, 8–29, 22–9
Arena Sport	Pts: Dobrić 27; Rebs: Nnoko 7 Asts: Loyd 6 PIR: Dobrić 27	Boxscore	Pts: D. Nikolić 26; Rebs: Reed 11; Asts: Ivanović 5 PIR: D. Nikolić 30	Arena: Aleksandar Nikolić Hall; Attendance: 1,375; Referees: Ilija Belošević, Miloš Koljenšić, Milan Nedović

Starters:			Pts	Reb	Ast
PG	1	(United States) Langston Hall	2	1	2
SG	3	(United States) Jordan Loyd	16	5	6
G/F	10	(Serbia) Branko Lazić	2	4	1
F	19	(Serbia) Marko Simonović	10	3	1
C	35	(Cameroon) Landry Nnoko	15	7	1
Reserves:					
PG	4	(Serbia) Aleksa Uskoković	3	1	5
G/F	7	(Serbia) Dejan Davidovac	6	4	1
F/C	11	(Australia) Duop Reath	0	0	0
SG	12	(Serbia) Aleksa Radanov	DNP		
G/F	13	(Serbia) Ognjen Dobrić	27	5	3
PF	21	(Serbia) Marko Jagodić-Kuridža	DNP		
C	32	(Serbia) Ognjen Kuzmić	4	4	0
Head coach:
(Basketball Federation of Montenegro) Dejan Radonjić

Crvena zvezda	Budućnost

CZV	Statistics	BUD
24/44 (54.5%)	2-pt field goals	17/41 (41.5%)
4/22 (18.2%)	3-pt field goals	8/23 (34.8%)
25/27 (92.6%)	Free throws	21/24 (87.5%)
11	Offensive rebounds	13
23	Defensive rebounds	23
34	Total rebounds	36
20	Assists	13
6	Turnovers	12
5	Steals	2
4 (4)	Blocks	4 (4)
20 (24)	Fouls	24 (20)

Starters:			Pts	Reb	Ast
PG	1	(Montenegro) Justin Cobbs	14	2	1
SG	44	(Montenegro) Fedor Žugić	0	0	0
G/F	4	(Montenegro) Suad Šehović	0	1	0
SF	3	(Canada) Melvin Ejim	12	8	3
C	33	(United States) Willie Reed	10	11	1
Reserves:					
PG	2	(Montenegro) Nikola Ivanović	12	2	5
PF	7	(Montenegro) Danilo Nikolić	26	8	0
F/C	8	(Serbia) Dragan Apić	DNP		
PF	9	(Serbia) Luka Mitrović	0	0	1
SG	11	(Italy) Amedeo Della Valle	5	0	0
C	19	(Montenegro) Zoran Nikolić	0	2	1
G	30	(Montenegro) Petar Popović	0	2	1
Head coach:
(Basketball Federation of Serbia) Dejan Milojević

=== Game 3 ===
22 May 2021	Budućnost VOLI (Montenegro)	75–71 (Series: 1–2)	(Serbia) Crvena zvezda mts	Podgorica
20:30	Scoring by quarter: 15–19, 20–13, 16–15, 24–24
Arena Sport	Pts: Della Valle 19; Rebs: D. Nikolić 8 Asts: Ivanović 6 PIR: Ivanović 19	Boxscore	Pts: Loyd 19; Rebs: Nnoko 11; Asts: Loyd 7 PIR: Nnoko 20	Arena: Morača Sports Center; Referees: Sreten Radović, Matej Boltauzer, Damir Javor

Starters:			Pts	Reb	Ast
PG	1	(Montenegro) Justin Cobbs	6	2	3
SG	11	(Italy) Amedeo Della Valle	19	0	1
SF	3	(Canada) Melvin Ejim	9	4	2
PF	7	(Montenegro) Danilo Nikolić	11	8	0
C	33	(United States) Willie Reed	7	6	0
Reserves:					
PG	2	(Montenegro) Nikola Ivanović	11	2	6
G/F	4	(Montenegro) Suad Šehović	0	0	0
F/C	8	(Serbia) Dragan Apić	DNP		
PF	9	(Serbia) Luka Mitrović	8	7	1
C	19	(Montenegro) Zoran Nikolić	2	1	0
G	30	(Montenegro) Petar Popović	2	1	1
SG	44	(Montenegro) Fedor Žugić	DNP		
Head coach:
(Basketball Federation of Serbia) Dejan Milojević

Budućnost	Crvena zvezda

BUD	Statistics	CZV
13/31 (41.9%)	2-pt field goals	21/42 (50%)
7/22 (31.8%)	3-pt field goals	6/27 (22.2%)
28/34 (82.4%)	Free throws	11/14 (78.6%)
7	Offensive rebounds	13
24	Defensive rebounds	22
31	Total rebounds	35
14	Assists	12
8	Turnovers	10
5	Steals	4
4 (4)	Blocks	4 (4)
22 (26)	Fouls	26 (21)

Starters:			Pts	Reb	Ast
PG	1	(United States) Langston Hall	4	3	2
SG	3	(United States) Jordan Loyd	19	0	7
G/F	10	(Serbia) Branko Lazić	5	4	0
F	19	(Serbia) Marko Simonović	2	2	0
C	35	(Cameroon) Landry Nnoko	10	11	0
Reserves:					
G	2	(United States) Corey Walden	3	1	0
PG	4	(Serbia) Aleksa Uskoković	0	1	1
G/F	7	(Serbia) Dejan Davidovac	10	8	1
F/C	11	(Australia) Duop Reath	0	0	0
SG	12	(Serbia) Aleksa Radanov	DNP		
G/F	13	(Serbia) Ognjen Dobrić	17	4	1
C	32	(Serbia) Ognjen Kuzmić	1	1	0
Head coach:
(Basketball Federation of Montenegro) Dejan Radonjić

=== Game 4 ===
24 May 2021	Budućnost VOLI (Montenegro)	81–80 (Series: 2–2)	(Serbia) Crvena zvezda mts	Podgorica
20:30	Scoring by quarter: 19–23, 20–19, 19–21, 23–17
Arena Sport	Pts: Cobbs 22; Rebs: D. Nikolić 9 Asts: Cobbs 7 PIR: Cobbs 29	Boxscore	Pts: Loyd 23; Rebs: Nnoko 7 Asts: Dobrić 6 PIR: Dobrić 17	Arena: Morača Sports Center; Referees: Saša Pukl, Uroš Nikolić, Sašo Petek

Starters:			Pts	Reb	Ast
PG	1	(Montenegro) Justin Cobbs	22	2	7
SG	11	(Italy) Amedeo Della Valle	5	2	1
SF	3	(Canada) Melvin Ejim	3	3	0
PF	7	(Montenegro) Danilo Nikolić	8	9	0
C	33	(United States) Willie Reed	8	2	0
Reserves:					
PG	2	(Montenegro) Nikola Ivanović	11	1	3
G/F	4	(Montenegro) Suad Šehović	0	3	0
F/C	8	(Serbia) Dragan Apić	DNP		
PF	9	(Serbia) Luka Mitrović	13	5	0
C	19	(Montenegro) Zoran Nikolić	10	3	1
G	30	(Montenegro) Petar Popović	1	0	0
SG	44	(Montenegro) Fedor Žugić	DNP		
Head coach:
(Basketball Federation of Serbia) Dejan Milojević

Budućnost	Crvena zvezda

BUD	Statistics	CZV
23/40 (57.5%)	2-pt field goals	18/36 (50%)
4/18 (22.2%)	3-pt field goals	10/23 (43.5%)
23/35 (65.7%)	Free throws	14/17 (82.4%)
8	Offensive rebounds	7
22	Defensive rebounds	24
30	Total rebounds	31
12	Assists	13
7	Turnovers	14
5	Steals	3
1 (2)	Blocks	2 (1)
17 (35)	Fouls	35 (17)

Starters:			Pts	Reb	Ast
PG	1	(United States) Langston Hall	5	1	2
SG	3	(United States) Jordan Loyd	23	3	1
G/F	10	(Serbia) Branko Lazić	6	4	0
F	19	(Serbia) Marko Simonović	6	3	0
C	35	(Cameroon) Landry Nnoko	12	7	3
Reserves:					
G	2	(United States) Corey Walden	5	2	1
PG	4	(Serbia) Aleksa Uskoković	0	0	0
G/F	7	(Serbia) Dejan Davidovac	3	6	0
F/C	11	(Australia) Duop Reath	DNP		
G/F	13	(Serbia) Ognjen Dobrić	13	2	6
PF	21	(Serbia) Marko Jagodić-Kuridža	DNP		
C	32	(Serbia) Ognjen Kuzmić	7	3	0
Head coach:
(Basketball Federation of Montenegro) Dejan Radonjić

=== Game 5 ===
28 May 2021	Crvena zvezda mts (Serbia)	67–60 (Series: 3–2)	(Montenegro) Budućnost VOLI	Belgrade
20:30	Scoring by quarter: 15–14, 18–14, 20–21, 14–11
Arena Sport	Pts: Nnoko 17; Rebs: Nnoko 12; Asts: Dobrić, Loyd 4 PIR: Nnoko 28	Boxscore	Pts: Cobbs 21; Rebs: Mitrović 9 Asts: Ivanović 8 PIR: Cobbs 26	Arena: Aleksandar Nikolić Hall; Attendance: 4,235; Referees: Tomislav Hordov, Josip Radojković, Milan Nedović

Starters:			Pts	Reb	Ast
PG	1	(United States) Langston Hall	4	1	1
SG	3	(United States) Jordan Loyd	15	4	4
G/F	10	(Serbia) Branko Lazić	3	1	0
F	19	(Serbia) Marko Simonović	3	1	0
C	35	(Cameroon) Landry Nnoko	17	12	2
Reserves:					
G	2	(United States) Corey Walden	5	0	2
PG	4	(Serbia) Aleksa Uskoković	0	0	1
G/F	7	(Serbia) Dejan Davidovac	0	1	0
F/C	11	(Australia) Duop Reath	DNP		
SG	12	(Serbia) Aleksa Radanov	DNP		
G/F	13	(Serbia) Ognjen Dobrić	12	8	4
C	32	(Serbia) Ognjen Kuzmić	8	5	1
Head coach:
(Basketball Federation of Montenegro) Dejan Radonjić

Crvena zvezda	Budućnost

CZV	Statistics	BUD
19/43 (44.2%)	2-pt field goals	13/31 (41.9%)
6/16 (37.5%)	3-pt field goals	6/20 (30%)
11/17 (64.7%)	Free throws	16/20 (80%)
10	Offensive rebounds	8
23	Defensive rebounds	26
33	Total rebounds	34
15	Assists	12
9	Turnovers	13
5	Steals	6
1 (1)	Blocks	1 (1)
23 (23)	Fouls	23 (23)

Starters:			Pts	Reb	Ast
PG	1	(Montenegro) Justin Cobbs	21	4	3
PG	2	(Montenegro) Nikola Ivanović	8	3	8
G/F	4	(Montenegro) Suad Šehović	0	0	0
PF	9	(Serbia) Luka Mitrović	8	9	0
C	19	(Montenegro) Zoran Nikolić	8	4	0
Reserves:					
SF	3	(Canada) Melvin Ejim	2	2	0
PF	7	(Montenegro) Danilo Nikolić	0	6	1
F/C	8	(Serbia) Dragan Apić	1	1	0
SG	11	(Italy) Amedeo Della Valle	7	1	0
G	30	(Montenegro) Petar Popović	5	4	0
C	33	(United States) Willie Reed	DNP		
SG	44	(Montenegro) Fedor Žugić	DNP		
Head coach:
(Basketball Federation of Serbia) Dejan Milojević

== See also ==
- 2021 ABA League Second Division Playoffs
