= 2018 ABA League Supercup =

- Season: 2018–19
- Dates: 20–23 September 2018
- Games played: 7
- Teams: 8
- TV partner(s): Arena Sport

Regular season
- Top seed: (Serbia) Crvena zvezda mts
- Season MVP: (Senegal) Mouhammad Faye

Finals
- Champions: (Serbia) Crvena zvezda mts
- Runners-up: (Montenegro) Budućnost VOLI
- Semifinalists: (Croatia) Cedevita (Serbia) Partizan NIS
- All statistics correct as of September 23, 2018.

The 2018 ABA League Supercup was the second tournament of the ABA League Supercup, featuring teams from the Adriatic League First Division.

== Qualified teams ==
Based on the results in the 2017–18 ABA League First Division season there are 8 participants at the 2018 Adriatic Supercup. Eighth team is the host. Qualified teams are the seven best placed teams of the season and the host.

Pos.	Adriatic League First Division
1	(Montenegro) Budućnost VOLI
2	(Serbia) Crvena zvezda mts
3	(Croatia) Cedevita
4	(Montenegro) Mornar
5	(Serbia) Partizan NIS
6	(Croatia) Zadar
7	(Slovenia) Petrol Olimpija
10	(Bosnia and Herzegovina) Igokea (host)

== Venue ==
Laktaši	2018 ABA League Supercup (Yugoslavia)
Laktaši Sports Hall	2018 ABA League Supercup (Yugoslavia)
Capacity: 3,050	2018 ABA League Supercup (Yugoslavia)

== Bracket ==
Source: ABA League

Quarterfinals
20 September
4 (Montenegro) Mornar	77
5 (Serbia) Partizan NIS	91
20 September
1 (Montenegro) Budućnost VOLI	90
8 (Bosnia and Herzegovina) Igokea	86
21 September
3 (Croatia) Cedevita	85
6 (Croatia) Zadar	77
21 September
2 (Serbia) Crvena zvezda mts	86
7 (Slovenia) Petrol Olimpija	60

Semifinals
22 September
(Serbia) Partizan NIS	87
(Montenegro) Budućnost VOLI (OT)	90
22 September
(Croatia) Cedevita	68
(Serbia) Crvena zvezda mts	79

Final
23 September
(Montenegro) Budućnost VOLI	75
(Serbia) Crvena zvezda mts	89

== Quarterfinals ==
=== Mornar v Partizan NIS ===
20 September 2018
18:00

Boxscore

Mornar (Montenegro)	77–91	(Serbia) Partizan NIS
Scoring by quarter: 18–22, 26–25, 19–20, 14–24
Pts: Carrington 20; Rebs: Luković 9 Asts: Vranješ 6		Pts: Gagić 23; Rebs: Gagić, Zagorac 6 Asts: Paige 8

Laktaši Sports Hall, Laktaši
Attendance: 1,000
Referees: Saša Pukl, Mario Majkić, Aleksandar Davidov

=== Budućnost VOLI v Igokea ===
20 September 2018
20:30

Boxscore

Budućnost VOLI (Montenegro)	90–86	(Bosnia and Herzegovina) Igokea
Scoring by quarter: 19–21, 20–24, 25–22, 26–19
Pts: Gordić 19; Rebs: Clarke 8 Asts: Gordić 6		Pts: Zubčić 21; Rebs: Zubčić 6 Asts: Adamović, Milošević 4

Laktaši Sports Hall, Laktaši
Attendance: 1,000
Referees: Tomislav Hordov, Gordan Terlević, Vladimir Mihajlović

=== Cedevita v Zadar ===
21 September 2018
18:00

Boxscore

Cedevita (Croatia)	85–77	(Croatia) Zadar
Scoring by quarter: 23–17, 20–20, 20–30, 22–10
Pts: Bell 23; Rebs: Aguilar, Lima 5 Asts: Magette, Cobbs 7		Pts: Grant 21; Rebs: Božić 9 Asts: Bašić 4

Laktaši Sports Hall, Laktaši
Attendance: 800
Referees: Uroš Obrknežević, Uroš Nikolić, Dragan Porobić

=== Crvena zvezda mts v Petrol Olimpija ===
21 September 2018
20:30

Boxscore

Crvena zvezda mts (Serbia)	86–60	(Slovenia) Petrol Olimpija
Scoring by quarter: 20–28, 20–14, 20–9, 26–9
Pts: Zirbes 14; Rebs: Faye 9 Asts: Ragland, Radanov 5		Pts: Mesiček 15; Rebs: Begić 5 Asts: Mesiček 4

Laktaši Sports Hall, Laktaši
Attendance: 1,500
Referees: Miloš Koljenšić, Igor Dragojević, Saša Babić

== Semifinals ==
=== Partizan NIS v Budućnost VOLI ===
22 September 2018
18:00

Boxscore

Partizan NIS (Serbia)	87–90 (OT)	(Montenegro) Budućnost VOLI
Scoring by quarter: 24–19, 25–24, 18–22, 9–11, Overtime: 11–14
Pts: Marinković 19; Rebs: Zagorac 8 Asts: Paige 7		Pts: Clark 17; Rebs: Su. Šehović 7 Asts: Jackson 5

Laktaši Sports Hall, Laktaši
Attendance: 2,000
Referees: Saša Pukl, Tomislav Hordov, Gordan Terlević

=== Cedevita v Crvena zvezda mts ===
22 September 2018
20:30

Boxscore

Cedevita (Croatia)	68–79	(Serbia) Crvena zvezda mts
Scoring by quarter: 16–25, 11–20, 17–11, 24–23
Pts: four players 10; Rebs: Aguilar 7 Asts: Magette 5		Pts: Ragland 20; Rebs: Faye 7 Asts: Čović 4

Laktaši Sports Hall, Laktaši
Attendance: 2,200
Referees: Miloš Koljenšić, Mario Majkić, Saša Babić

== Final ==
23 September 2018
21:00

Boxscore

Budućnost VOLI (Montenegro)	75–89	(Serbia) Crvena zvezda mts
Scoring by quarter: 16–28, 16–29, 23–21, 20–11
Pts: Barović 19; Rebs: Clarke 6 Asts: Jackson 5		Pts: Faye 14; Rebs: Zirbes, Lazić 5 Asts: Ragland 7

Laktaši Sports Hall, Laktaši
Attendance: 2,500
Referees: Saša Pukl, Tomislav Hordov, Mario Majkić

Budućnost	Crvena zvezda

Starters:			Pts	Reb	Ast
PG	14	(United States) Aaron Craft	2	1	1
SG	1	(France) Edwin Jackson	7	5	5
G/F	4	(Montenegro) Suad Šehović	0	1	1
PF	34	(Montenegro) Danilo Nikolić	16	3	1
PF	5	(United States) Earl Clark	11	1	0
Reserves:					
PG	2	(Montenegro) Nikola Ivanović	0	0	0
F/C	6	(Montenegro) Filip Barović	19	5	0
SF	7	(United States) Coty Clarke	9	6	1
PG	10	(Bosnia and Herzegovina) Nemanja Gordić	7	2	2
PF	13	(Montenegro) Aleksa Ilić	0	4	0
C	19	(Montenegro) Zoran Nikolić	DNP		
G	30	(Montenegro) Petar Popović	4	1	0
Head coach:
(Serbia) Aleksandar Džikić

2018 ABA Supercup Winner

Crvena zvezda mts
1st title
MVP
(Senegal) Mouhammad Faye

Starters:			Pts	Reb	Ast
PG	1	(United States) Joe Ragland	10	2	7
G	12	(United States) Billy Baron	4	0	4
SF	10	(Serbia) Branko Lazić	3	5	2
PF	11	(Senegal) Mouhammad Faye	14	4	2
C	33	(Germany) Maik Zirbes	13	5	1
Reserves:					
PG	3	(Serbia) Filip Čović	DNP		
SF	5	(Greece) Stratos Perperoglou	12	2	4
G	9	(Serbia) Nemanja Nenadić	8	2	5
G/F	13	(Serbia) Ognjen Dobrić	12	3	2
C	14	(Serbia) Dušan Ristić	5	2	0
PF	22	(Serbia) Boriša Simanić	0	0	0
C	50	(Nigeria) Michael Ojo	8	3	1
Head coach:
(Serbia) Milan Tomić

== See also ==
- 2018–19 ABA League First Division
