= 2019–20 Prva A liga =

Prva A Liga
- Season: 2019–20
- Duration: 12 October 2019 – May 2020
- Teams: 12

Finals
- Champions: Null and void

The 2019–20 Prva A Liga, known as Erste košarkaške lige by sponsorship reasons, is the 14th season of the Montenegrin Basketball League, the top tier basketball league on Montenegro. Mornar is the defending champion.

== Competition format ==
Ten of the twelve teams that play the league join the regular season and play a two-round robin competition where the six first qualified teams join the Super Liga with the two 2019–20 ABA League teams (Budućnost Voli and Mornar). The last qualified team would play a relegation playoff against the second qualified of the Prva B.

== Teams ==
Locations of the 2019–20 Prva A Liga teams

Club	City	Arena
All Stars		
Budućnost VOLI	Podgorica	Morača
Danilovgrad	Danilovgrad	
Ibar	Rožaje	Bandžovo Brdo
Jedintsvo	Bijelo Polje	
Lovćen Bemax	Cetinje	
Mornar	Bar	Topolica
Primorje	Herceg Novi	
Studenski centar	Bijelo Polje	
Sutjeska	Nikšić	Nikšić Sports Center
Teodo	Tivat	Dvorana Župa Tivat
Zeta	Golubovci	

== Regular season ==
=== League table ===
Pos	Team	Pld	W	L	PF	PA	PD	Pts
1	Sutjeska	19	19	0	1743	1498	+245	38
2	Lovćen Bemax	20	17	3	1697	1469	+228	37
3	Ibar	20	17	3	1700	1478	+222	37
4	Studenski centar	20	14	6	1670	1538	+132	34
5	Teodo	20	9	11	1606	1537	+69	29
6	Jedinstvo	20	7	13	1500	1645	−145	27
7	All Stars	20	6	14	1524	1603	−79	26
8	Danilovgrad	20	4	16	1455	1631	−176	24
9	Primorje	20	4	16	1520	1708	−188	24
10	Zeta	20	3	17	1329	1637	−308	23

Source: Montenegrin Basketball Federation

=== Results ===
Home \ Away	ALL	DAN	IBA	JED	LOV	PRI	STU	SUT	TEO	ZET	ALL	DAN	IBA	JED	LOV	PRI	STU	SUT	TEO	ZET
All Stars	—	82–69	70–71	73–75	71–80	79–74	77–84	79–86	71–70	63–74	—									
Danilovgrad	57–82	—	69–88	70–64	78–81	99–73	68–84	74–88	59–63	70–78		—					68–73			
Ibar	100–73	81–66	—	96–66	91–90	87–70	78–67	71–80	91–75	97–59		94–69	—							
Jedinstvo	88–93	85–93	82–94	—	67–88	78–68	63–76	69–89	80–70	75–70				—					77–72	
Lovćen Bemax	82–73	89–65	75–55	102–69	—	86–80	87–81	81–91	73–68	72–61					—	91–82				
Primorje	79–73	85–79	68–75	74–75	79–104	—	76–93	83–94	69–83	86–70			97–102			—				
Studenski centar	90–86	95–72	68–76	100–81	70–85	86–78	—	78–104	83–79	101–75				86–72			—			
Sutjeska	73–56	105–82	75–67	76–68	90–84	81–69	82–80	—	93–85	90–60					77–98			—		78–66
Teodo	95–88	80–75	80–83	97–71	77–85	100–55	77–81	87–88	—	69–62	112–79								—	
Zeta	67–82	61–73	79–103	58–95	52–62	73–75	54–94	61–103	72–75	—	77–74									—

Updated to match(es) played on 7 March 2020. Source:
Legend: Blue = home team win; Red = away team win.

== Montenegrin clubs in European competitions ==
Team	Competition	Progress
Budućnost VOLI	EuroCup	Regular season
Mornar	Champions League	Regular season
