= Sead Šehović =

Montenegrin basketball player

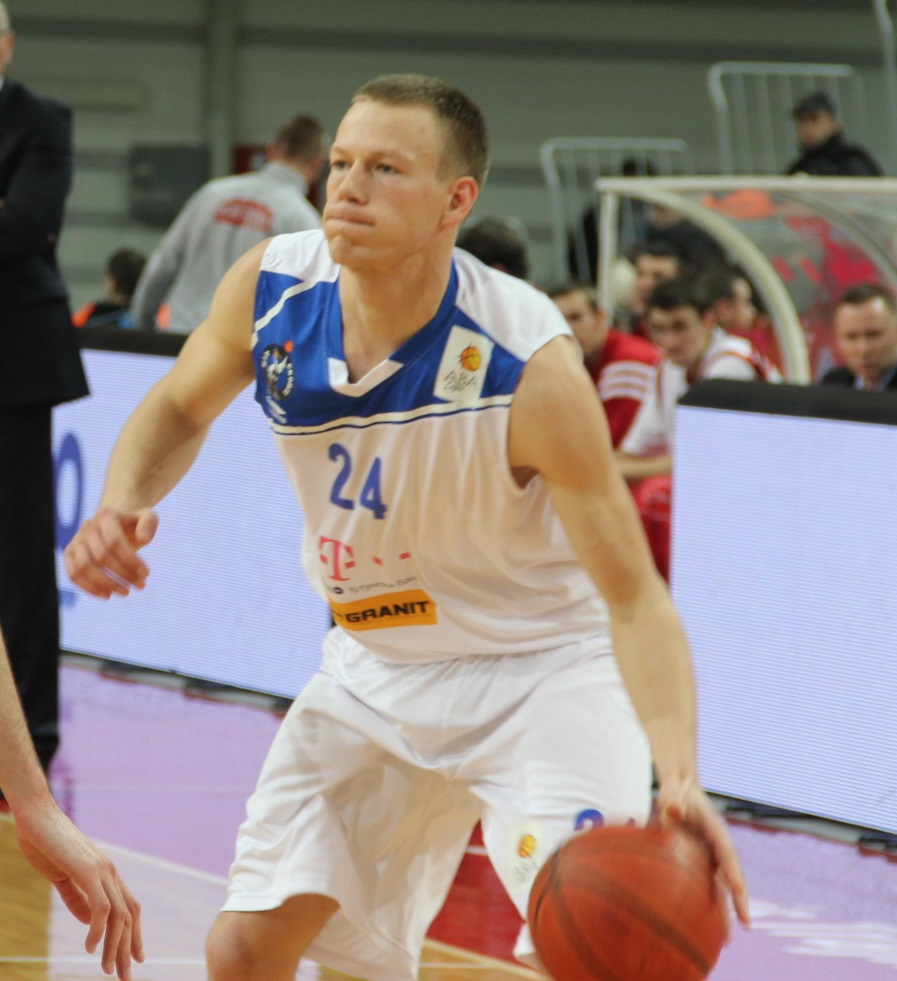
- with MZT in 2014

Personal information
- Born: August 22, 1989 (age 37) Bijelo Polje, SR Montenegro, SFR Yugoslavia
- Listed height: 1.96 m (6 ft 5 in)
- Listed weight: 95 kg (209 lb)

Career information
- NBA draft: 2011: undrafted
- Playing career: 2006–present
- Position: Small forward / shooting guard

Career history
- 2006–2007: Bosna
- 2007–2011: Budućnost
- 2011–2012: Oldenburg
- 2012–2013: Szolnoki Olaj
- 2013: Bayreuth
- 2013–2015: MZT Skopje
- 2015–2019: Budućnost
- 2019–2022: Mornar

Career highlights
- ABA League champion (2018); 7× Montenegrin League champion (2008–2011, 2016, 2017, 2019); 2× Macedonian League champion (2014, 2015); 8× Montenegrin Cup winner (2008–2011, 2016–2019); Macedonian Cup winner (2014); Macedonian League Finals MVP (2015)

Sead Šehović (Serbian Cyrillic: Сеад Шеховић; born 22 August 1989) is a Montenegrin professional basketball player who last played for Mornar of the ABA League and the Montenegrin League. He is the younger brother of professional basketball player Suad Šehović.

== Career ==
For the 2006–07 season he played for KK Bosna. In April 2007 Šehović made his first visit to the United States playing with the top American prospects in the Boo Williams Invitational tournament.

In 2008 he played for national youth team on European Championship U20 in Riga, Latvia, where he showed some interesting potential. In 2009 he played at both, the youth and senior level, for the Montenegro national basketball team. Sehovic first competed at the 2009 U20 European Championship Men where he averaged 17.6 points per contest, including a 36-point, six-rebound performance against Ukraine. Then he suited up for the senior team where he scored 15 in a win over Iceland that helped propel Montenegro into Division A.

In 2009 he was one of the 15 candidates nominated in a Young Men Player of the Year category, by FIBA Europe, while in Montenegro he was proclaimed for the best young player.

In 2011 he signed a contract with the EWE Baskets Oldenburg to play in the German league. He later played with Szolnoki Olaj and BBC Bayreuth. On December 30, 2013, he signed with MZT Aerodrom.

On July 28, 2015, he signed with Budućnost Podgorica. On June 21, 2019, Šehović signed for Mornar.

== Career statistics ==
Legend
GP	Games played	GS	Games started	MPG	Minutes per game
FG%	Field-goal percentage	3P%	3-point field-goal percentage	FT%	Free-throw percentage
RPG	Rebounds per game	APG	Assists per game	SPG	Steals per game
BPG	Blocks per game	PPG	Points per game	PIR	Performance index rating
**Bold**	Career high

=== Domestic leagues ===
Season	Team	League	GP	MPG	FG%	3P%	FT%	RPG	APG	SPG	BPG	PPG
2006–07 ABA NLB League	KK Bosna Royal	ABA League	13	6.2	.357	.000	.455	0.5	0.2	0.1	.0	1.2
2007–08 ABA NLB League	KK Budućnost	ABA League	4	3.0	.000	.000	.000	0.3	0.3	.0	.0	0
2008–09 ABA NLB League	KK Budućnost	ABA League	16	10.9	.533	.353	.741	1.4	0.2	0.2	0.1	3.6
2009–10 ABA NLB League	KK Budućnost	ABA League	26	17.7	.435	.333	.857	2.8	0.9	0.5	.0	6.1
2010–11 ABA NLB League	KK Budućnost	ABA League	26	15	.422	.300	.776	1.8	0.7	0.3	.0	5.9
2012–13 ABA League	Szolnoki Olaj KK	ABA League	22	30.2	.456	.333	.683	4.8	2.5	0.6	0.2	12.2
2013–14	MZT Skopje	ABA League	12	24.6	.402	.257	.793	3	2.3	0.3	.0	9.5
2014–15	MZT Skopje	ABA League	20	30.1	.355	.235	.682	3.8	2.1	1	0.1	10.5
2015–16	KK Budućnost	ABA League	27	22.2	.439	.329	.638	3	3	0.4	.0	7.8
