= Suad Šehović =

Montenegrin basketball player

Free agent
- Position: Small forward / shooting guard

Personal information
- Born: 19 February 1987 (age 39) Bijelo Polje, SR Montenegro, SFR Yugoslavia
- Listed height: 1.97 m (6 ft 6 in)
- Listed weight: 100 kg (220 lb)

Career information
- NBA draft: 2009: undrafted
- Playing career: 2005–present

Career history
- 2005–2010: Bosna
- 2010–2011: Union Olimpija
- 2011–2012: Budivelnyk
- 2012–2013: Khimik
- 2013–2023: Budućnost

Career highlights
- ABA League champion (2018); 2× Bosnian League champion (2006, 2008); 8× Montenegrin League champion (2014–2017, 2019, 2021–2023); 2× Bosnian Cup winner (2009, 2010); Slovenian Cup winner (2011); Ukrainian Cup winner (2012); 10× Montenegrin Cup winner (2014–2023); All-ABA League Team (2015)
Medals
Men's basketball
Representing Montenegro
Games of the Small States of Europe
Gold medal – first place	2015 Reykjavík	Team

Suad Šehović (Montenegrin: Суад Шеховић; born 19 February 1987) is a Montenegrin professional basketball player. He is the older brother of professional basketball player Sead Šehović.

He averaged 5.4 points and 2.7 rebounds per game during the 2019–20 season. On 9 June 2020 he re-signed with Budućnost.
