= Petar Popović (basketball, born 1996) =

Montenegrin basketball player

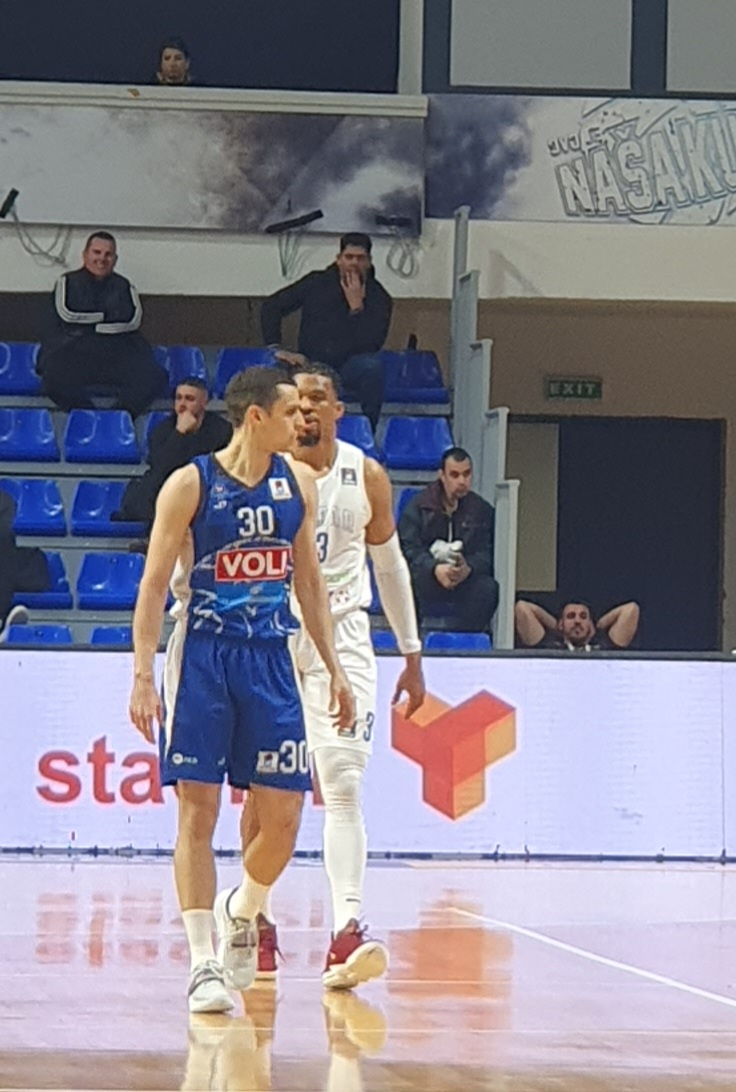
- Popović with Budućnost in 2023.

No. 30 – Ilirija
- Position: Point guard / shooting guard
- League: Slovenian League; ABA League

Personal information
- Born: 13 September 1996 (age 30) Cetinje, Montenegro, FR Yugoslavia
- Listed height: 1.92 m (6 ft 4 in)
- Listed weight: 90 kg (198 lb)

Career information
- NBA draft: 2018: undrafted
- Playing career: 2011–present

Career history
- 2011–2014: Lovćen Cetinje
- 2014–2016: Nea Kifissia
- 2016: →Mega Leks
- 2016–2024: Budućnost
- 2024–2025: FMP
- 2025–2026: Igokea
- 2026–present: Ilirija

Career highlights
- ABA League champion (2018); 6× Montenegrin League champion (2017, 2019, 2021–2024); 7× Montenegrin Cup winner (2017–2023)
Medals
Men's basketball
Representing Montenegro
FIBA Under-18 Championship Division B
| Gold medal – first place | 2013 Macedonia | Team |

Petar Popović (born 13 September 1996) is a Montenegrin professional basketball player for Ilirija of the Slovenian League and the ABA League.

== Professional career ==
Popović began his professional career with the 1st-tier Montenegrin Basketball League club KK Lovćen, during the 2011–12 season. After three years with the club, he joined Nea Kifissia of the 1st-tier Greek League signing a three-year deal. In 2016, he was loaned to Mega Leks.

== Montenegrin national team ==
Popović was a member of the junior national teams of Montenegro. He won the gold medal at the 2013 FIBA Europe Under-18 Championship Division B with Montenegro. He has also played at the 2015 FIBA Europe Under-20 Championship Division B and at the 2014 FIBA Europe Under-18 Championship.
