= Danilo Nikolić (basketball) =

Montenegrin basketball player

No. 34 – Spartak Subotica
- Position: Power forward / center
- League: Serbian SuperLeague; ABA League; FIBA Champions League

Personal information
- Born: April 8, 1993 (age 33) Podgorica, Montenegro, FR Yugoslavia
- Listed height: 2.06 m (6 ft 9 in)
- Listed weight: 93 kg (205 lb)

Career information
- NBA draft: 2015: undrafted
- Playing career: 2010–present

Career history
- 2010–2011: Gorštak
- 2011–2014: Budućnost
- 2013–2014: → Lovćen
- 2014–2016: Mega
- 2016–2017: Bilbao
- 2017–2022: Budućnost
- 2022: JDA Dijon
- 2022–2023: Avtodor Saratov
- 2023: UCAM Murcia
- 2023–2024: Limoges CSP
- 2024–present: Spartak Subotica

Career highlights
- ABA League champion (2018); 5× Montenegrin League champion (2012, 2013, 2019, 2021, 2022); 7× Montenegrin Cup winner (2012, 2013, 2018–2022); Serbian League champion (2026); Serbian Cup winner (2016)

Danilo Nikolić (born 8 April 1993) is a Montenegrin professional basketball player and the team captain for Spartak Subotica of the Serbian SuperLeague, the ABA League, and the FIBA Champions League.
