= Nikola Ivanović =

Montenegrin basketball player

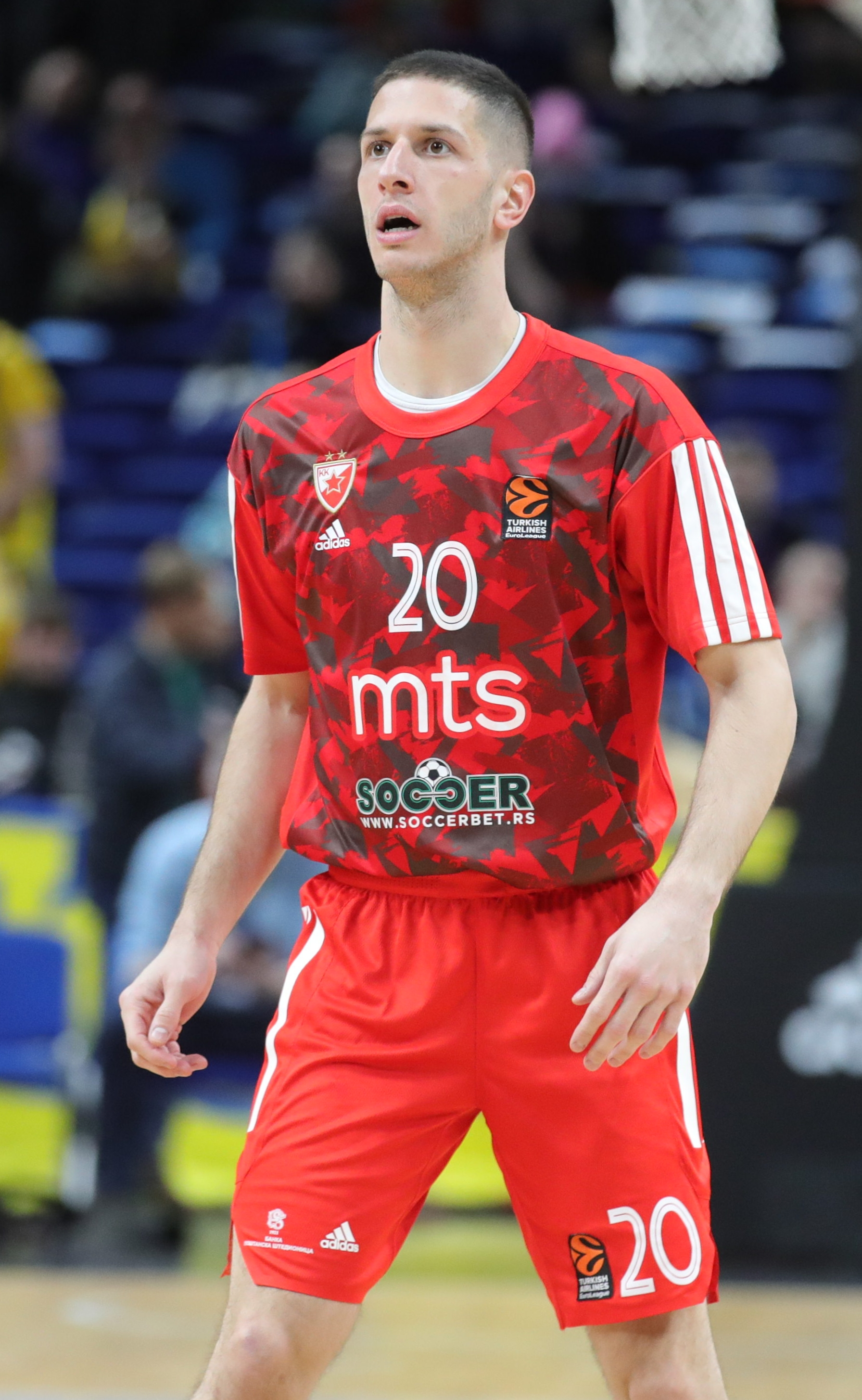
- Ivanović with Crvena zvezda in 2022

No. 18 – Galatasaray
- Position: Point guard
- League: Basketbol Süper Ligi

Personal information
- Born: February 19, 1994 (age 32) Podgorica, Montenegro, FR Yugoslavia
- Listed height: 1.90 m (6 ft 3 in)
- Listed weight: 85 kg (187 lb)

Career information
- NBA draft: 2016: undrafted
- Playing career: 2012–present

Career history
- 2010–2011: Mornar
- 2011–2015: Budućnost
- 2015–2016: Mega
- 2016–2017: AEK Athens
- 2017: →Orlandina
- 2017–2021: Budućnost
- 2021–2023: Crvena zvezda
- 2023–2024: Runa Basket Moscow
- 2024–2026: Germani Brescia
- 2026–present: Galatasaray

Career highlights
- 2× ABA League champion (2018, 2022); 6× Montenegrin League champion (2012–2015, 2019, 2021); 7× Montenegrin Cup winner (2012, 2014, 2015, 2018–2021); 2× Serbian League champion (2022, 2023); 3× Serbian Cup winner (2016, 2022, 2023); Serbian Cup MVP (2016); All-EuroCup Second Team (2018); ABA League Ideal Starting Five (2021); Serbian League Playoffs MVP (2022)

Nikola Ivanović (Montenegrin: Никола Ивановић; born February 19, 1994) is a Montenegrin professional basketball player for Galatasaray of the Basketbol Süper Ligi (BSL). Standing at 1.90 m (6 ft 3 in), he plays at the point guard position.

== Professional career ==
=== Early career ===
Ivanović started his career in local club KK Joker Podgorica. He then played for Mornar Bar during the 2010–11 season, averaging 10.1 points, 4.5 assists and 3.8 steals per game. While in Mornar he also averaged 11.3 points, 3.1 assists and 1.5 steals per game during 2010–11 BIBL season.

=== Budućnost Podgorica ===
In 2011, Ivanović transferred to the biggest Montenegrin basketball club, Budućnost Podgorica, signing his first professional contract in February 2012, after he turned 18. In his first season with the team, he averaged 6.9 points, 1.4 assists and 1 steal per game in 16.2 minutes per game played in the 2011–12 ABA League season.

During the 2013–14 season, Ivanović was handed a chance with being the first point guard option for Budućnost due to the injury of the starting point guard, Aleksandar Ćapin. Ivanović took up the opportunity in the late half of the season and had his best showings against Union Olimpija when he scored 28 points, making 8 out of his 11 shots for two points and also adding one three-pointer. In the same game he also had 3 assists and 2 steals with an index rating of 31.

In the next game against Szolnoki Olaj he again showed great performance by scoring 27 points, making 4 assists and taking 2 steals. He shot 4 from 7 for two points and made 5 out of 7 three-pointers. He had a final index rating of 36.

On July 15, 2015, he parted ways with Budućnost.

=== Mega Leks ===
On July 31, 2015, Ivanović moved to Serbia and signed with Mega Leks. In Adriatic League he averaged 30.2 minutes with 13.4 points, 5.2 assists and 1.5 steals. He won the Serbian Cup with Mega Leks against rivals Partizan. In the finals he scored 24 points, five assists and he was the MVP of the competition.

=== AEK Athens / Orlandina ===
On June 14, 2016, Ivanović signed a three-year contract with the Greek club AEK Athens. On January 11, 2017, he was loaned to Italian club Orlandina Basket for the rest of the 2016–17 Serie A season.

=== Budućnost VOLI ===
On September 13, 2017, Ivanović returned to Budućnost VOLI.

=== Crvena zvezda mts ===
On June 18, 2021, he has signed with Crvena zvezda of the Adriatic League. The club won ABA League, Serbian League, and Serbian Cup in the 2021–22 season.

=== Pallacanestro Brescia ===
On June 19, 2024, he signed with Germani Brescia of the Italian Lega Basket Serie A (LBA).

=== Galatasaray ===
On July 18, 2026, he signed with Galatasaray of the Basketbol Süper Ligi (BSL).

== Montenegrin national team ==
After going through many youth national teams of Montenegro, Ivanović became standard member of the senior Montenegrin national team. On 18 August 2012, Ivanović scored an amazing three-pointer buzzer beater from a half court in a match against Serbia.

== Career statistics ==
=== Basketball Champions League ===
Year	Team	GP	MPG	FG%	3P%	FT%	RPG	APG	SPG	BPG	PPG
2016–17	A.E.K.	11	17.0	.408	.310	1.000	1.1	1.1	.9	0	4.9
