= 2015–16 Prva A liga =

Prva A Liga
- Teams: 11

Finals
- Champions: Budućnost Voli (10th title)
- Runners-up: Mornar

The 2015–16 Prva A Liga, known as Erste košarkaške lige by sponsorship reasons, was the 10th season of the Montenegrin Basketball League, the top tier basketball league on Montenegro. The season started on November 6, 2015. Budućnost VOLI is the defending champion.

== Competition format ==
Nine of the eleven teams that play the league join the regular season and play a three-round robin competition where the six first qualified teams join the playoffs with the two 2015–16 ABA League teams (Budućnost Voli and Sutjeska). The last qualified team is relegated.

== Regular season ==
Pos	Team	Pld	W	L	PF	PA	PD	Pts	Qualification
1	Mornar	23	23	0	1832	1318	+514	46	Qualification to the playoffs
2	Teodo Tivat	23	20	3	1716	1463	+253	43	Qualification to the playoffs
3	Ulcinj	24	14	10	1794	1644	+150	38	Qualification to the playoffs
4	Lovćen	24	12	12	1675	1644	+31	36	Qualification to the playoffs
5	Ibar Rožaje	24	10	14	1844	1626	+218	34	Qualification to the playoffs
6	Jedinstvo	24	9	15	1545	1885	−340	33	Qualification to the playoffs
7	Danilovgrad	24	8	16	1524	1679	−155	32	
8	Studenski centar	24	8	16	1518	1742	−224	32	
9	Stršljen	24	3	21	1444	1814	−370	27	Relegated

Source: KSCG

== Playoffs ==
Quarterfinals
1	Budućnost Voli	2
8	Jedinstvo	0
4	Teodo Tivat	1
5	Ulcinj	2
2	Sutjeska	2
7	Ibar Rožaje	0
3	Mornar	2
6	Lovćen	0

Semifinals
1	Budućnost Voli	2
4	Ulcinj	0
2	Sutjeska	0
3	Mornar	2

Finals
1	Budućnost Voli	3
2	Mornar	1
