= KK Ibar =

- League: Montenegrin League
- Founded: 1984; 42 years ago
- History: KK Rozaje (1984–present)
- Arena: Large hall of SC Rožaje
- Capacity: 2,500
- Location: Rožaje, Montenegro
- Team colors: Green and White
- President: Izet Bralic
- Head coach: Demir Kalić
- Most recent season position: 8
- Championships: 1 Prva B Liga
Home	Away

KK Ibar is a professional basketball club from Rožaje, Montenegro. The team currently competes in the Erste Basketball League. They gained their status of a first division team by winning the second division league Prva B Liga in 2011/12. The club also competes in all leagues for younger players.

== History ==
KK Ibar was founded in 1981. by Faruk Tabaković and Faruk Kalić in Rožaje, SFR Yugoslavia. The club doesn't have huge successes in their history. The biggest success of the senior team is the title of Prva B Liga Championship in 2012. and the 2012/13 placement in the quarter final of the Montenegrin Cup.

== Sports Center ==
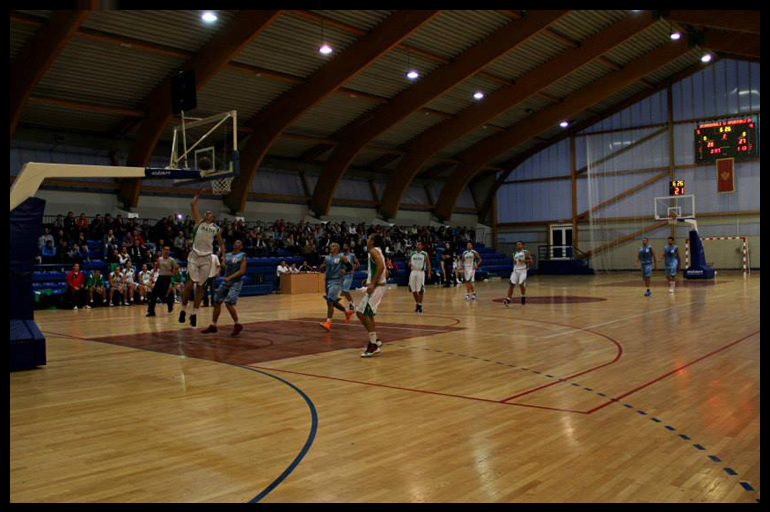
Inside view of the SC Rožaje, Bandžovo Brdo

Sports Center Rožaje (Bosnian/Montenegrin: Sportski centar Rožaje) is a sport center located in Rožaje, Montenegro. The sports center is located on Bandžovo Brdo, next to the main city football stadium. Construction of this sports complex began in 2006. The director is Rešid Pepić. The complex was created by the decision of The Municipal Assembly of Rožaje number 1383 from 10.07.2006. The main activity of the complex is the management and maintenance of sports facilities as well as:

- providing services in the field of sports and recreation
- provision of sport competitions for the organization of sports events and training
- provision of services to citizens and working collectives in sport and recreational activities
- organizing sports and cultural and public events

The main arena is built for various sports, such as:

- Basketball
- Handball
- Futsal
- Table tennis
- Indoor tennis
- Volleyball
- and other

== Supporters ==
Location of Rožaje, Montenegro

Ibar fans are known as Gazije (from Arabic: ghāzī or ghazah, gazi; from ghazw, plural: ghazawāt; meaning 'armed incursion with the intention of conquering'. Gazije were the defenders of Islam in the period of the Ottoman Empire.) The group is founded in 1996. The group's traditional colours are black and white, which are also the colours of the football club FK Ibar where Gazije first started giving their support. After the football club failed to reach the First Montenegrin League in 2006., 2007. and 2008., the footballers lost the support of fans since they failed to win the away play-off match against FK Dečić for the First league placement. The basketball club was first time supported by a big group of supporters in the first matches of Erste League.

== Honours ==
=== Domestic competitions ===
Active sport clubs of Ibar
Basketball	Football	Volleyball
Judo	Table Tennis	Karate
Fishing	Chess	Hunting

==== League ====
- Prva Erste Liga

Winners (0): none

Runners-up (0): none

- Prva B Liga

Winners (1): 2012

Runners-up (0): none

==== Cups ====
- Montenegrin Basketball Cup

Winners (0)': none

Runners-up (0): none
Best placement: Quarter finals (2014–15)

== Players ==
=== Depth chart ===
Pos.	Starting 5	Bench 1	Bench 2
C	Kaleb Tarczewski	Hadžibegović Haris
PF	Goran Oluić	Alen Dacić	Kenan Zejnelović
SF	Armin Kalić	Nedim Feleć	Emir Kardović
SG	Eldin Kalić	Emir Kardović	Nych Smith
PG	Perović Marko	Nurković Admir	Nemanja Simović

=== Squad changes for the 2013–14 season ===
==== In ====
- (Serbia) Goran Oluić (from (Spain) Basket Globalcaja Quintanar)
- (Serbia) Nemanja Simović (from (Montenegro) KK Ibar Junior Team)
- (Montenegro) Alen Dacić (from (Montenegro) KK Ibar Junior Team)

==== Out ====
- (Montenegro) Živojin Grubović (to (Estonia) KK Pärnu)
- (United States) Brandon Roberson (to (Kosovo) KB RTV 21)
- (Montenegro) Mersudin Košuta
- (Serbia) Filip Simić (to (Serbia) KK Radnički OB)
- (Serbia) Vladimir Čuljković
- (Montenegro) Demir Kalić
- (United States) John Clack

== 2012/13 results ==
Regular season and play out results

=== First Erste League - Regular season ===
Team	P	Pld	W	L	PD	Pts
(Montenegro) Sutjeska	1	18	15	3	+266	33
(Montenegro) Mornar	2	18	14	4	+147	32
(Montenegro) Teodo	3	18	14	4	+98	32
(Montenegro) Ulcinj	4	18	10	8	+62	28
(Montenegro) Lovćen	5	18	10	8	+45	28
(Montenegro) Jedinstvo	6	18	8	10	−71	26
(Montenegro) Danilovgrad	7	18	6	12	−128	24
(Montenegro) Centar	8	18	5	13	−132	23
(Montenegro) ABS Primorje	9	18	4	14	−112	22
(Montenegro) Ibar	10	18	4	14	−175	22

Results		
Team	Home	Away
(Montenegro) KK Mornar	88-67 L	100-83 L
(Montenegro) KK ABS Primorje	75-85 L	78-75 W
(Montenegro) KK Teodo	73-67 L	98-86 L
(Montenegro) KK Centar	90-81 W	82-78 L
(Montenegro) KK Lovćen	89-85 W	90-80 L
(Montenegro) KK Ulcinj	98-76 L	89-74 L
(Montenegro) KK Sutjeska	62-97 L	74-60 L
(Montenegro) KK Jedinstvo	78-77 W	79-67 L
(Montenegro) KK Danilovgrad	84-91 L	91-78 L

=== Survival Erste League - Play Out ===
Team	P	Pld	W	L	PD	Pts
(Montenegro) Jedinstvo	1	10	6	4	+62	16
(Montenegro) Ibar	2	10	6	4	+4	16
(Montenegro) ABS Primorje	3	10	6	4	−7	16
(Montenegro) Centar	4	10	5	5	+7	15
(Montenegro) Danilovgrad	5	10	5	5	−3	15
(Montenegro) Studentski Centar	6	10	2	8	−63	12

Results		
Team	Home	Away
(Montenegro) KK Jedinstvo	59-51 W	91-85 W
(Montenegro) KK ABS Primorje	74-73 L	90-82 L
(Montenegro) KK Danilovgrad	77-66 W	76-69 L
(Montenegro) KK Centar	63-59 W	75-58 L
(Montenegro) KK Studentski Centar	81-77 W	78-74 W

== 2013/14 Results ==
=== First Erste League - Regular season ===
Team	P	Pld	W	L	PD	Pts
(Montenegro) Lovćen	1	8	7	1	84	15
(Montenegro) Sutjeska	2	8	6	2	67	14
(Montenegro) Zeta 2011	3	8	5	3	28	13
(Montenegro) Teodo	4	8	5	3	12	13
(Montenegro) Ibar	5	8	5	3	2	13
(Montenegro) Mornar	6	8	4	4	22	12
(Montenegro) Jedinstvo	7	8	4	4	10	12
(Montenegro) Ulcinj	8	8	2	6	-9	10
(Montenegro) ABS Primorje	9	8	1	7	-64	9
(Montenegro) Centar	10	8	1	7	-152	9

Results		
Team	Home	Away
(Montenegro) KK Mornar	83-80 W	
(Montenegro) KK ABS Primorje	66-62 W	
(Montenegro) KK Teodo	56-55 W	
(Montenegro) KK Centar	98-64 W	
(Montenegro) KK Lovćen		72-61 L
(Montenegro) KK Ulcinj	69-68 W	
(Montenegro) KK Sutjeska		
(Montenegro) KK Jedinstvo		73-58 L
(Montenegro) KK Zeta 2011		72-57 L

== Notable players ==
In the short history of the basketball club Ibar from Rožaje, the best players who played for the club are from the team which lead this team to the First Montenegrin league in front with Mersudin Kušuta. Most of those players play still in the club. In the first appearances as a top league team, one of the most notable players was Brandon Roberson from the United States who left the club after the first half of the season 2012/2013.

=== Notable former players ===
- (United States) Brandon Roberson
- (Montenegro) Alija Dedeic

== Sponsorships ==
Official shirt sponsor	ALDI
Official broadcaster	TV APR
