= Willie Reed =

American basketball player (born 1990)

No. 33 – Calor de Cancún
- Position: Center
- League: LNBP

Personal information
- Born: May 16, 1990 (age 36) Kansas City, Missouri, U.S.
- Listed height: 6 ft 11 in (2.11 m)
- Listed weight: 245 lb (111 kg)

Career information
- High school: Bishop Miege (Roeland Park, Kansas)
- College: Saint Louis (2008–2010)
- NBA draft: 2011: undrafted
- Playing career: 2011–present

Career history
- 2012–2014: Springfield Armor
- 2014: Reno Bighorns
- 2014: Hapoel Eilat
- 2014–2015: Grand Rapids Drive
- 2015: Iowa Energy
- 2015: Metros de Santiago
- 2015–2016: Brooklyn Nets
- 2016–2017: Miami Heat
- 2017–2018: Los Angeles Clippers
- 2018: Detroit Pistons
- 2018–2019: Salt Lake City Stars
- 2019–2020: Olympiacos
- 2020: Salt Lake City Stars
- 2020–2022: Budućnost
- 2024: Tainan TSG GhostHawks
- 2025–2026: Cocodrilos de Caracas
- 2026–present: El Calor de Cancún

Career highlights
- Montenegrin League champion (2021); 2× Montenegrin Cup winner (2021, 2022); All-EuroCup First Team (2021); All-NBA D-League First Team (2015); NBA D-League All-Defensive First Team (2015); NBA D-League All-Defensive Second Team (2014); NBA D-League All-Star (2015)
- Stats at NBA.com
- Stats at Basketball Reference

Willie Reed Jr. (born May 16, 1990) is an American professional basketball player for El Calor de Cancún of the Liga Nacional de Baloncesto Profesional (LNBP). He played college basketball for Saint Louis University.

== College career ==
Reed spent two seasons playing for Saint Louis University between 2008–09 and 2009–10. Reed, who had had previous run-ins with Saint Louis University's student conduct board, was suspended during the Fall semester of the 2010–11 academic year for his involvement in a controversial sexual assault incident involving three other players. He returned at the start of the Spring semester but was later "administratively withdrawn" by the university for failing to meet the terms of his reinstatement as a student.

In April 2011, Reed declared for the NBA draft, forgoing his final two years of college eligibility.

== Professional career ==
=== 2011–12 season ===
Reed went undrafted in the 2011 NBA draft. In August 2011, he signed a two-year deal with CB Sant Josep of Spain. He later left before the start of the regular season.

=== 2012–13 season ===
On September 21, 2012, Reed signed with the Sacramento Kings. However, he was later waived by the Kings on October 26, 2012. In November 2012, he was acquired by the Springfield Armor of the NBA D-League. He went on to earn Honorable Mention All-Development League Team honors after averaging 14.8 points and 7.8 rebounds per game throughout the 2012–13 season.

On April 17, 2013, he signed with the Memphis Grizzlies for the remainder of the season.

=== 2013–14 season ===
In July 2013, Reed joined the Memphis Grizzlies for the 2013 NBA Summer League. On October 26, 2013, he was waived by the Grizzlies before appearing in a regular season game for them.

On November 1, 2013, he was re-acquired by the Springfield Armor.

On March 28, 2014, he signed with the Sacramento Kings for the rest of the season, but was immediately assigned to the Reno Bighorns. On April 9, 2014, he was recalled by the Kings. The next day, he was reassigned to the Bighorns. On April 14, 2014, he was recalled by the Kings.

On June 29, 2014, Reed was waived by the Kings before he appeared in a game for them.

=== 2014–15 season ===
In July 2014, Reed joined the Indiana Pacers for the 2014 NBA Summer League. On September 25, 2014, he signed with the Brooklyn Nets. However, he was later waived by the Nets on October 23, 2014. He then signed with the Israeli Super League club Hapoel Eilat, but he played in just one game with the club.

On November 21, 2014, Reed was acquired by the Grand Rapids Drive. On February 4, 2015, he was named to the Futures All-Star team for the 2015 NBA D-League All-Star Game. On February 26, he was traded to the Iowa Energy in exchange for Diante Garrett.

On April 28, 2015, Reed signed with Metros de Santiago of the Liga Nacional de Baloncesto. He played 10 games for Metros between May 20 and June 15.

=== 2015–16 season ===
On July 1, 2015, Reed joined the Miami Heat for the 2015 NBA Summer League. However, on July 9, he left the Heat's summer league team and signed a one-year, $500,000 contract with the Brooklyn Nets. On October 14, Reed suffered a torn ulnar collateral ligament in his right thumb in a preseason game against the Boston Celtics and underwent surgery to repair it, leaving him out of action for six to eight weeks. On December 4, Reed made his long-awaited NBA debut, recording eight points in 11 minutes against the New York Knicks. On January 22, 2016, he scored a season-high 12 points in a loss to the Utah Jazz. On April 6, he left the team for the remainder of the season for personal reasons.

=== 2016–17 season ===
On July 13, 2016, Reed signed with the Miami Heat. He made his debut for the Heat in their season opener on October 26 against the Orlando Magic. In 17 minutes off the bench, he recorded 10 points, six rebounds, one assist and one block in a 108–96 win. On January 3, 2017, he recorded career highs of 22 points and 18 rebounds in a 99–90 loss to the Phoenix Suns. Three days later, he had a second 22-point effort in a 127–100 loss to the Los Angeles Lakers.

=== 2017–18 season ===
On August 3, 2017, Reed signed to a one-year, $1.5 million contract with the Los Angeles Clippers.

On January 29, 2018, Reed, along with Blake Griffin and Brice Johnson, was traded to the Detroit Pistons in exchange for Avery Bradley, Tobias Harris, Boban Marjanović, a future protected first-round draft pick and a future second-round draft pick. On February 6, 2018, Reed was suspended by the NBA for six games without pay as a result of a domestic violence incident involving his wife on August 5, 2017. Two days later, he was traded to the Chicago Bulls alongside future second-round draft considerations in exchange for Jameer Nelson. He was immediately waived by the Bulls upon being acquired.

=== 2018–19 season ===
On October 20, 2018, Reed was selected with the first overall pick in the 2018 NBA G League draft by the Salt Lake City Stars. Reed played 21 games for the Stars, averaging 20.1 points and 11.2 rebounds per contest. On January 16, 2019, Reed suffered a season-ending shoulder injury and was waived by the team.

=== 2019–20 season ===
On October 26, 2019, Reed signed with the Greek EuroLeague team Olympiacos. He was released by Olympiacos on January 10, 2020, after averaging 6.5 points and 2.8 rebounds in 11 games.

On January 22, 2020, Reed was acquired by the Salt Lake City Stars, returning to the franchise for a second stint.

=== 2020–21 season ===
On September 17, 2020, Reed signed with Budućnost of the Montenegrin Basketball League. He was named to the All-EuroCup First Team.

=== 2021–22 season ===
On August 26, 2021, Reed extended his contract with Budućnost.

=== 2022–23 season ===
On January 27, 2023, he signed with Fuenlabrada of the Liga ACB, but he didn't play any game.

=== 2023–24 season ===
On January 26, 2024, Reed signed with the Tainan TSG GhostHawks of the T1 League. On February 5, 2024, the Tainan TSG GhostHawks terminated the contract relationship with Reed due to health consideration.

=== 2024–25 season ===
On March 14, 2025, Reed signed with the Cocodrilos de Caracas of the Superliga Profesional de Baloncesto (SPB) for the 2025 season.

== NBA career statistics ==
Legend
GP	Games played	GS	Games started	MPG	Minutes per game
FG%	Field goal percentage	3P%	3-point field goal percentage	FT%	Free throw percentage
RPG	Rebounds per game	APG	Assists per game	SPG	Steals per game
BPG	Blocks per game	PPG	Points per game	**Bold**	Career high

=== Regular season ===
Year	Team	GP	GS	MPG	FG%	3P%	FT%	RPG	APG	SPG	BPG	PPG
2015–16	Brooklyn	39	2	10.9	.571	.000	.545	3.1	.3	.2	**.8**	4.7
2016–17	Miami	**71**	**5**	**14.5**	.568	.200	.557	**4.7**	**.4**	**.3**	.7	**5.3**
2017–18	L.A. Clippers	39	**5**	**14.5**	.667	**.500**	**.582**	3.1	.2	.2	.6	4.9
2017–18	Detroit	3	0	3.0	**1.000**	.000	.000	.3	.3	.0	.0	0.7
Career		152	12	12.4	.592	.333	.561	3.8	.3	.2	.7	4.9

== See also ==
- List of people banned or suspended by the NBA
