= Zoran Nikolić (basketball) =

Montenegrin basketball player

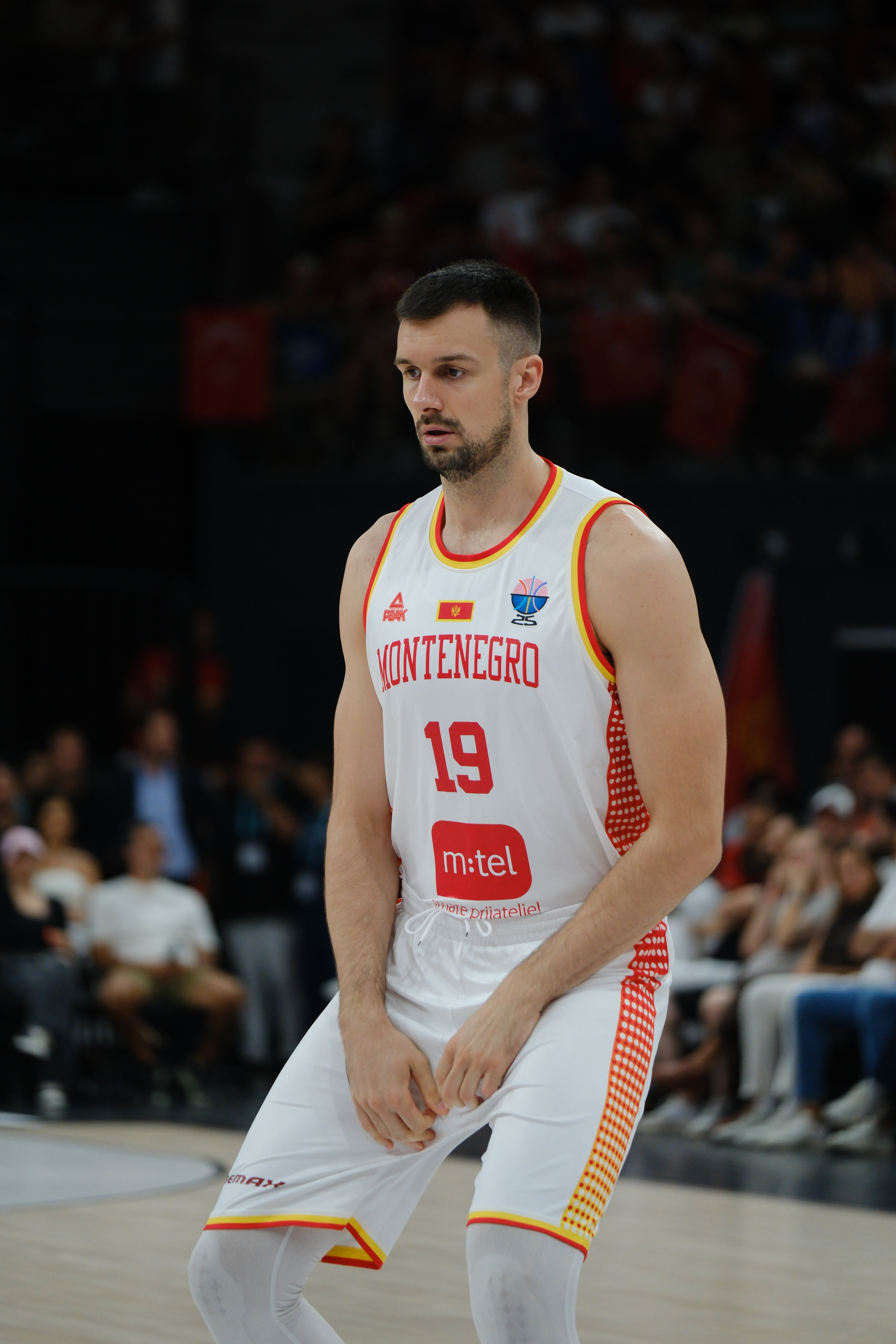
- Nikolić with Montenegro in 2025

No. 19 – Budućnost VOLI
- Position: Center
- League: Montenegrin League; ABA League

Personal information
- Born: April 1, 1996 (age 30) Nikšić, Montenegro, FR Yugoslavia
- Listed height: 2.13 m (7 ft 0 in)
- Listed weight: 107 kg (236 lb)

Career information
- NBA draft: 2018: undrafted
- Playing career: 2012–present

Career history
- 2012–2013: Sant Josep
- 2013–2016: Joventut Badalona
- 2013–2016: →Prat
- 2016–2022: Budućnost
- 2022–2023: ESSM Le Portel
- 2024–2025: Vojvodina
- 2025–present: Budućnost

Career highlights
- ABA League champion (2018); 4× Montenegrin League champion (2017, 2019, 2021, 2022); 5× Montenegrin Cup winner (2017, 2018, 2020–2022)
Medals
Representing Montenegro
Men's basketball
Games of the Small States of Europe
Silver medal – second place	2017 San Marino	National Team

Zoran Nikolić (born April 1, 1996) is a Montenegrin professional basketball player for Budućnost of the Prva A Liga and ABA League.
