= Nemanja Gordić =

Bosnian basketball player (born 1988)

No. 10 – Metalac Valjevo
- Position: Point guard / shooting guard
- League: Serbian First League

Personal information
- Born: September 25, 1988 (age 38) Mostar, SR Bosnia and Herzegovina; Yugoslavia
- Listed height: 1.93 m (6 ft 4 in)
- Listed weight: 90 kg (198 lb)

Career information
- NBA draft: 2010: undrafted
- Playing career: 2005–present

Career history
- 2005–2010: Budućnost
- 2010–2012: Virtus Roma
- 2012: Azovmash
- 2012–2013: Partizan
- 2013–2014: Igokea
- 2014–2016: Cedevita
- 2016–2019: Budućnost
- 2019–2020: Partizan
- 2020–2022: Mornar Bar
- 2022–2023: U-BT Cluj-Napoca
- 2023: Igokea
- 2024–2025: Spartak Subotica
- 2025–2026: Karşıyaka
- 2026–present: Metalac Valjevo

Career highlights
- 2× ABA League champion (2013, 2018); ABA League Finals MVP (2018); All-ABA League Team (2018); ABA League Supercup (2019); Serbian League champion (2013); Romanian League champion (2023); ABA League Second Division champion (2024); 2× Croatian League champion (2015, 2016); 2× Croatian Cup winner (2015, 2016); 6× Montenegro League champion (2007–2010, 2017, 2019); 7× Montenegrin Cup winner (2007–2010, 2017–2019); ABA League career stats leaders: ABA League all-time leading scorer; ABA League all-time assists leader

Nemanja Gordić (Serbian Cyrillic: Немања Гордић; born September 25, 1988) is a Bosnian professional basketball player for Metalac Valjevo of the Serbian First League. He also represents the senior Bosnia and Herzegovina national basketball team internationally. Gordić also holds Serbian citizenship.

== Professional career ==
Gordić made his professional debut with Budućnost Podgorica in the 2005–06 season. In December 2010, Gordić moved to Lottomatica Roma in Italy, where he would spend the next two seasons.

In November 2012, after only three months at Azovmash of Ukraine, Gordić signed with Partizan until the end of the 2013–14 season. In June 2013, he parted ways with Partizan. In October 2013, he signed a one-year deal with KK Igokea.

In June 2014, he signed a three-year deal with Cedevita Zagreb. After two seasons he left Cedevita and returned to his former club Budućnost.

In the 2017–18 season, Gordić won the ABA League title with Budućnost. After winning the series versus Crvena zvezda 1–3, Gordić was named ABA League Finals MVP.

On 5 July 2019, he returned to his former club Partizan. Gordić averaged 8.8 points and 4.6 assists per game. He re-signed with the team on 16 July 2020. Gordić left the team mid-season to join Mornar Bar, averaging 6.9 points and 4.5 assists per game. He re-signed with Mornar Bar on 14 August 2021.

On November 13, 2022, he signed with Cluj of the Romanian Liga Națională.

On September 13, 2023, signed a contract with the Bosnian team Igokea. However, he played just 5 ABA League games with them, averaging 5.6 points and 3.8 assists on 30.4% shooting from the field.

On January 4, 2024, Gordić signed a contract with the Serbian team Spartak Subotica. In 12 ABA League Second Division games with the team until the end of the season, he averaged 11.9 points, 6.2 assists and 2.3 rebounds per game. Spartak managed to win the championship title, after defeating Vojvodina in two-game finals series.

On October 17, 2025, he signed with Karşıyaka Basket of the Basketbol Süper Ligi (BSL).

On August 24, 2026, Gordić signed with Metalac Valjevo of the Serbian First League.

== National team career ==
Gordić played for the senior national team of Bosnia and Herzegovina at the EuroBasket 2011, the EuroBasket 2013, and the EuroBasket 2015.

== Personal life ==
He was born in 1988, in Mostar, SFR Yugoslavia in a Serb family. When he was four, he and his family took refuge to Gacko, his mother's birth town.

== Career statistics ==
Legend
GP	Games played	GS	Games started	MPG	Minutes per game
FG%	Field-goal percentage	3P%	3-point field-goal percentage	FT%	Free-throw percentage
RPG	Rebounds per game	APG	Assists per game	SPG	Steals per game
BPG	Blocks per game	PPG	Points per game	PIR	Performance index rating
**Bold**	Career high

=== EuroLeague ===
Year	Team	GP	GS	MPG	FG%	3P%	FT%	RPG	APG	SPG	BPG	PPG	PIR
2010–11	Lottomatica	6	1	22.6	**.413**	**.467**	.667	.3	2.5	.2	.0	**9.7**	4.5
2012–13	Partizan	5	1	11.2	.350	.143	.000	2.0	.6	.4	.0	3.0	-1.0
2014–15	Cedevita	10	6	**27.2**	.402	.385	**.875**	**2.1**	**3.9**	**2.1**	.0	9.6	**8.7**
2015–16	Cedevita	21	**18**	19.1	.382	.250	.810	1.3	3.1	.3	.0	4.6	3.4
2018–19	Budućnost	**30**	**18**	23.3	.387	.304	.714	1.7	3.6	.6	.0	7.6	6.3
Career		72	26	21.7	.379	.330	.750	1.5	3.2	.7	.0	6.8	5.1

== Awards ==
- Sportsperson of the year in Republika Srpska, 2014
- 2× ABA League champion (2013, 2018)
- 6× Montenegrin League champion (2007–2010, 2017, 2019)
- Serbian League champion (2013)
- 2× Croatian League champion (2015, 2016)
- Serbian Cup winner (2020)
- 7× Montenegrin Cup winner (2007–2010, 2017–2019)
- 2× Croatian Cup winner (2015, 2016)
- ABA League Finals MVP (2018)
- All-ABA League Team (2018)
- ABA League Supercup (2019)
