= 2011–12 Prva A liga =

Prva A liga 2011-12
- League: Opportunity League
- Sport: Basketball
- Duration: October 15, 2011 –

Regular season

Prva A liga seasons
- ← 2010–11 2012–13 →

The Prva A liga 2011–12 basketball team regular season started October 2011.

The Opportunity Liga (in English: Opportunity League) is a national professional basketball league in Montenegro. It is the top basketball division in Montenegro's Košarkaški savez Crne Gore (KSCG) national basketball federation. It was established in the year 2006, shortly after Montenegro declared its independence from Serbia and Montenegro. The league is sponsored by Opportunity Bank.

== Teams ==
- KK Budućnost - Podgorica
- KK Danilovgrad - Danilovgrad
- KK Teodo - Tivat
- KK Lovćen - Cetinje
- KK Mogren - Budva
- KK Mornar - Bar
- KK Ulcinj - Ulcinj
- KK ABS Primorje - Herceg Novi
- KK Jedinstvo - Bijelo Polje
- KK Podgorica - Podgorica
- KK Sutjeska - Nikšić
Prva A liga 2011–12 – Club Locations

== Regular season ==
	Team	Pts	Pld	W	L	PF	PA	Diff	Qualification
1	KK Mornar	14	7	7	0	724	518	+206	Qualified for the Playoffs
2	KK Mogren	14	8	6	2	630	649	-19	Qualified for the Playoffs
3	KK Lovćen	13	8	5	3	646	524	+122	Qualified for the Playoffs
4	KK Sutjeska	13	8	5	3	561	619	-58	Qualified for the Playoffs
5	KK Ulcinj	11	7	4	3	504	466	+38	Qualified for the Playoffs
6	KK Teodo	11	8	3	5	600	579	+21	
7	KK Podgorica	11	8	3	5	652	686	-34	
8	KK Jedinstvo	10	8	2	6	623	686	-63	
9	ABS Primorje	10	8	2	6	563	655	-92	
10	KK Danilovgrad	10	8	2	6	622	575	-121	
