= 2013–14 Prva A liga =

- League: Prva A liga
- Sport: Basketball

Regular season
- Top seed: Budućnost Podgorica
- Top scorer: (Montenegro) Darko Vujačić (18.1) (Ulcinj)

Finals
- Champions: Budućnost Podgorica
- Runners-up: Zeta 2011

Prva A liga seasons
- ← 2012–13 2014–15 →

The 2013–14 Prva A liga season was another season of the Montenegrin Basketball League. Budućnost Podgorica won their 7th national championship.

== Regular season ==
Superliga

Pos.	Team	W	L	Qualified for
1	Budućnost Podgorica	10	0	Playoffs
2	Mornar Bar	5	5	Playoffs
3	Zeta 2011	5	5	Playoffs
4	Teodo Tivat	4	6	Playoffs
5	Sutjeska	3	7	
6	Lovćen	3	7	

== Playoffs ==
Semifinals
1	Budućnost Podgorica	2
4	Teodo Tivat	0
2	Mornar Bar	1
3	Zeta 2011	2

Finals
1	Budućnost Podgorica	3
3	Zeta 2011	0
