= Igor Đaletić =

Montenegrin basketball player

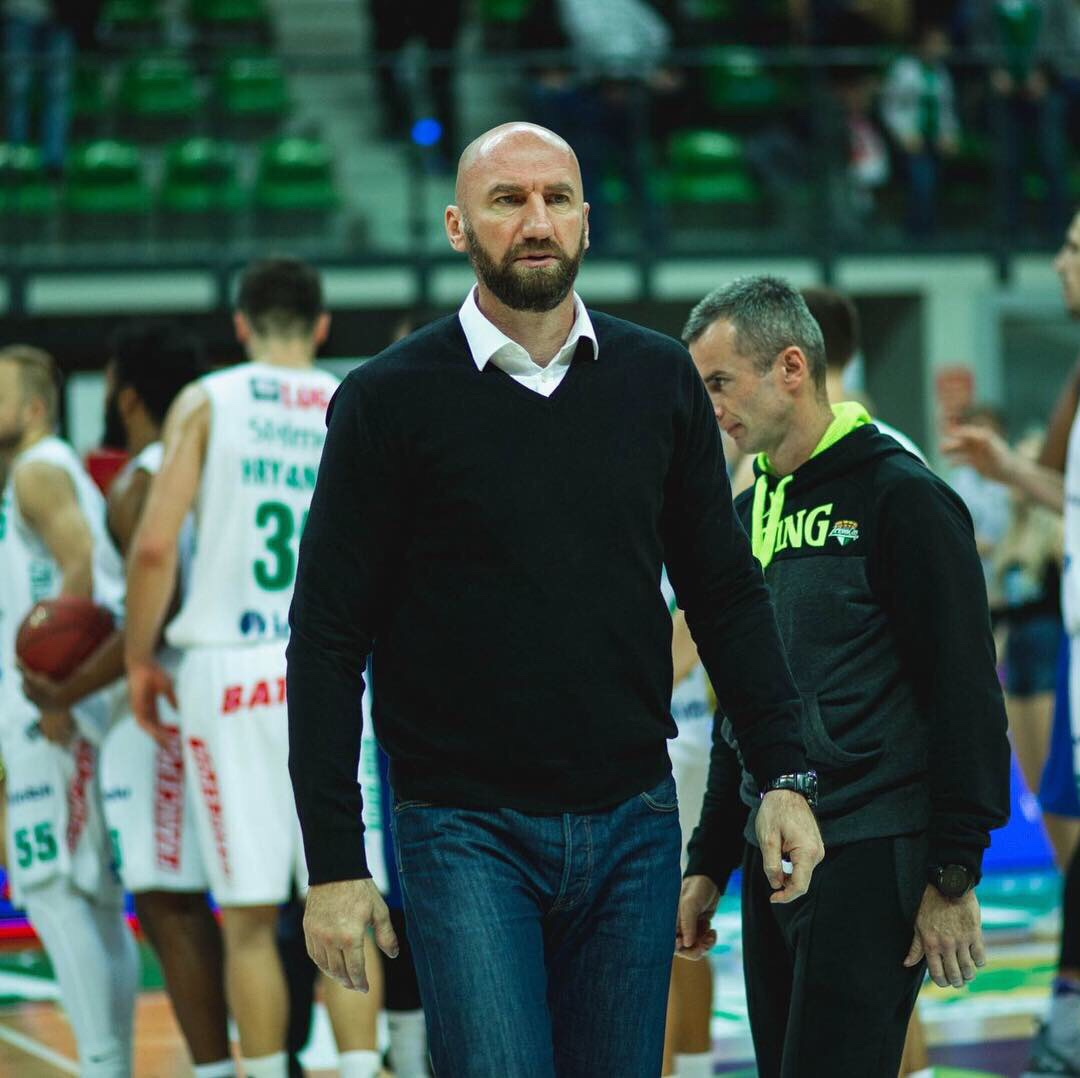
- Đaletić with Zielona Góra in 2018

Personal information
- Born: 27 September 1971 (age 55) Titograd, SR Montenegro, SFR Yugoslavia
- Listed height: 6 ft 9 in (2.06 m)

Career information
- Playing career: 1989–2008
- Position: Power forward / center
- Coaching career: 2010–present

Career history

Playing
- 1989–1990: Budućnost
- 1990–1991: Sutjeska
- 1991–1992: Partizan Tivat
- 1992–1993: Budućnost
- 1993–1995: Lovćen
- 1995–1997: Budućnost
- 1997–1998: Iva Zorka Pharma Šabac
- 1998–2001: Borac Čačak
- 2001: Zdravlje
- 2001–2002: Leiria Basket
- 2002: Crvena zvezda
- 2002–2003: Queluz
- 2003–2004: CSU Asesoft Ploiești
- 2004–2005: Igokea
- 2005–2006: Napredak Kruševac
- 2006–2008: Danilovgrad

Coaching
- 2010–2011: Budućnost Women
- 2011–2018: Budućnost (Assistant)
- 2018–2019: Basket Zielona Góra (Assistant)
- 2019–2022: Alvark Tokyo (Assistant)
- 2022–2024: Yokohama B-Corsairs (Assistant)
- 2024–2025: Sendai 89ers (Assistant)
- 2025: Sendai 89ers (Head coach)

Career highlights
- As player: Yugoslav Cup winner (1996); Romanian League champion (2004); Romanian Cup winner (2004); Liga Portuguesa de Basquetebol All-star game (2003); As head coach: 2× Montenegrin League champion (2016, 2017); As assistant coach: ABA League champion (2018); 4× Montenegrin League champion (2012, 2013, 2014, 2015); 6× Montenegrin Cup winner (2012, 2014, 2015, 2016, 2017, 2018); FIBA Asia Champions Cup winner (2019)

Igor Đaletić (Montenegrin Cyrillic: Игор Ђалетић; born 27 September 1971) is a Montenegrin professional basketball coach and former player. He currently serves as an assistant coach for Yokohama B-Corsairs of the B.League.

== Coaching career ==
Đaletić started in season 2010-11 as a women's head coach for Budućnost Podgorica (Montenegro).
In season 2011 Đaletić was named as assistant coach for man basketball team Budućnost Voli, ABA League where he stayed till season 2017–18. In 2015-16 and 2016-17 he was appointed as the head coach of Budućnost Voli and he won two Montenegrin League titles.
After resigning at Budućnost Voli in July 2018, Đaletić signed as assistant coach for team Basket Zielona Góra(Poland) for 2018–19 season.
In season 2019-20 Đaletić assigned for Alvark Tokyo(Japan) as assistant coach. The team won the FIBA Asia Champions Cup title the same season. In the 2022–23 season, Igor was an assistant coach with the Yokohama B-Corsairs. In his first season, the team reached the semifinals of the Emperor's Cup as well as the semifinals of the B.League. In the 2024–25 season, Igor became an assistant coach for the Sendai 89ers, and from March 2025, he became the head coach of the team.

== National team coaching career ==
In 2013 Đaletić was named an assistant coach of Montenegro women's national team for EuroBasket Women 2015 qualification, where they took 2nd place in the group. Đaletić was an assistant coach on EuroBasket Women 2015 where they finished on 7th place.

== Career achievements and awards ==
As player

- 1995-96 Yugoslav Cup winner (with Budućnost)
- 2002-03 Liga Portuguesa de Basquetebol All-star Game
- 2003-04 Romanian League champion (with CSU Asesoft Ploieşti)
- 2003-04 Romanian Cup winner (with CSU Asesoft Ploieşti)

As head coach

- 2015-16 Montenegrin League champion (with Budućnost)
- 2016-17 Montenegrin League champion (with Budućnost)

As assistant coach

- 2011-12 EuroCup quarterfinals, ABA League Final four, Montenegrin League champion and Montenegrin Cup winner (with Budućnost)
- 2012-13 EuroCup quarterfinals, Montenegrin League champion (with Budućnost)
- 2013-14 Montenegrin League champion and Montenegrin Cup (with Budućnost)
- 2014-15 ABA League semifinal, Montenegrin League champion and Montenegrin Cup winner (with Budućnost)
- 2015-16 ABA League semifinal, Montenegrin Cup winner (with Budućnost)
- 2016-17 ABA League semifinal, Montenegrin Cup winner (with Budućnost)
- 2017-18 ABA League champion, EuroCup quarterfinals, Montenegrin Cup winner (with Budućnost)
- 2019-20 FIBA Asia Champions Cup champion (with Alvark Tokyo)
