= KK Jedinstvo Bijelo Polje =

Jedinstvo 1950
- Leagues: Montenegrin League
- Founded: 1950; 75 years ago
- History: Jugotes TNN (1994–1998)
- Arena: Nikoljac Sport Hall
- Capacity: 2,000
- Location: Bijelo Polje, Montenegro
- Team colors: Blue, White
- Main sponsor: Meridianbet
- Head coach: Goran Popović

KK Jedinstvo Bijelo Polje (Cyrillic: Кошаркашки клуб Јединство Бијело Поље), commonly known as Jedinstvo 1950, is a men's professional basketball club based in Bijelo Polje, Montenegro. The team currently competes in First Erste League and plays its home games at Nikoljac Hall, which has a capacity of 2,000 spectators. The club is presently sponsored by Meridianbet.

The club also operates a basketball school that is open to all age groups and categories.

== History ==
KK Jedinstvo was founded in 1950. From 1994 to 1998, it competed under the name Jugotes TNN. During the period of SFR and FR Yugoslavia, the club mainly played in the lower leagues. Its only appearance in the First League occurred in the 1994–95 season, when it finished in 15th place. Since Montenegro's independence and the establishment of the national championship in the 2006–07 season, the club has been a regular participant.

== Statistics ==
Season	Tier	League	Position
2006-07	1	First League	8th
2007-08	1	First League	9th
2008-09	1	First League	9th
2009-10	1	First League	10th
2010-11	1	First League	6th
2011-12	1	First League	9th
2012-13	1	First League	7th
2013-14	1	First League	8th
2014-15	1	First League	8th
2015-16	1	First League	8th
2016-17	1	First League	9th
2017-18	1	First League	8th
2018-19	1	First League	6th
2019-20	1	First League	Canceled due to the coronavirus pandemic
2020-21	1	First League	10th
2021-22	1	First League	6th
2022-23	1	First League	7th
2023-24	1	First League	12th

== Notable players ==
Note: Flags indicate national team eligibility at FIBA-sanctioned events. Players may hold other non-FIBA nationalities not displayed.

Criteria

To appear in this section a player must have either:

- Set a club record or won an individual award while at the club
- Played at least one official international match for their national team at any time
- Played at least one official NBA match at any time.

(Bosnia and Herzegovina) Mihailo Drobnjak; (Bosnia and Herzegovina) Goran Sladojević; (Bosnia and Herzegovina) Ivica Vukotić; (Montenegro) Danilo Drašković; (Montenegro) Emir Hadžibegović; (Montenegro) Duško Ivanović; (Montenegro) Nemanja Knežević; (Montenegro) Boris Lalović; (Montenegro) Arso Leković	(Montenegro) Lazar Smolović; (Montenegro) Mladen Šekularac; (Serbia) Dušan Cvetković; (Serbia) Filip Dumic; (Serbia) Ivan Gemaljević; (Serbia) Goran Ignjatović; (Serbia) Aleksandar Ivanović; (Serbia) Dušan Mažibrada; (Serbia) Dragan Mijajlović	(Serbia) Danilo Mitrović; (Serbia) (Bosnia and Herzegovina) Miloš Mladenović; (Serbia) Nikola Munjić; (Serbia) Dejan Radulović; (Serbia) Nemanja Rakočević; (Serbia) Miloš Savković; (Serbia) Žarko Stanković; (Serbia) Mirko Tokalić; (Serbia) Vujadin Vorkapić	(United States) Alex Brown; (United States) Anthony Chisley; (United States) Tyrell Corbin; (United States) Anthony Cousin; (United States) Daniel Cromwell; (United States) David Jackson; (United States) Anthony Jones; (United States) Andre Woodlin; (Albania) (Kosovo) Ersid Ljuca

== See also ==
- ŽKK Jedinstvo Bijelo Polje
