= Justin Cobbs =

American-born Montenegrin basketball player

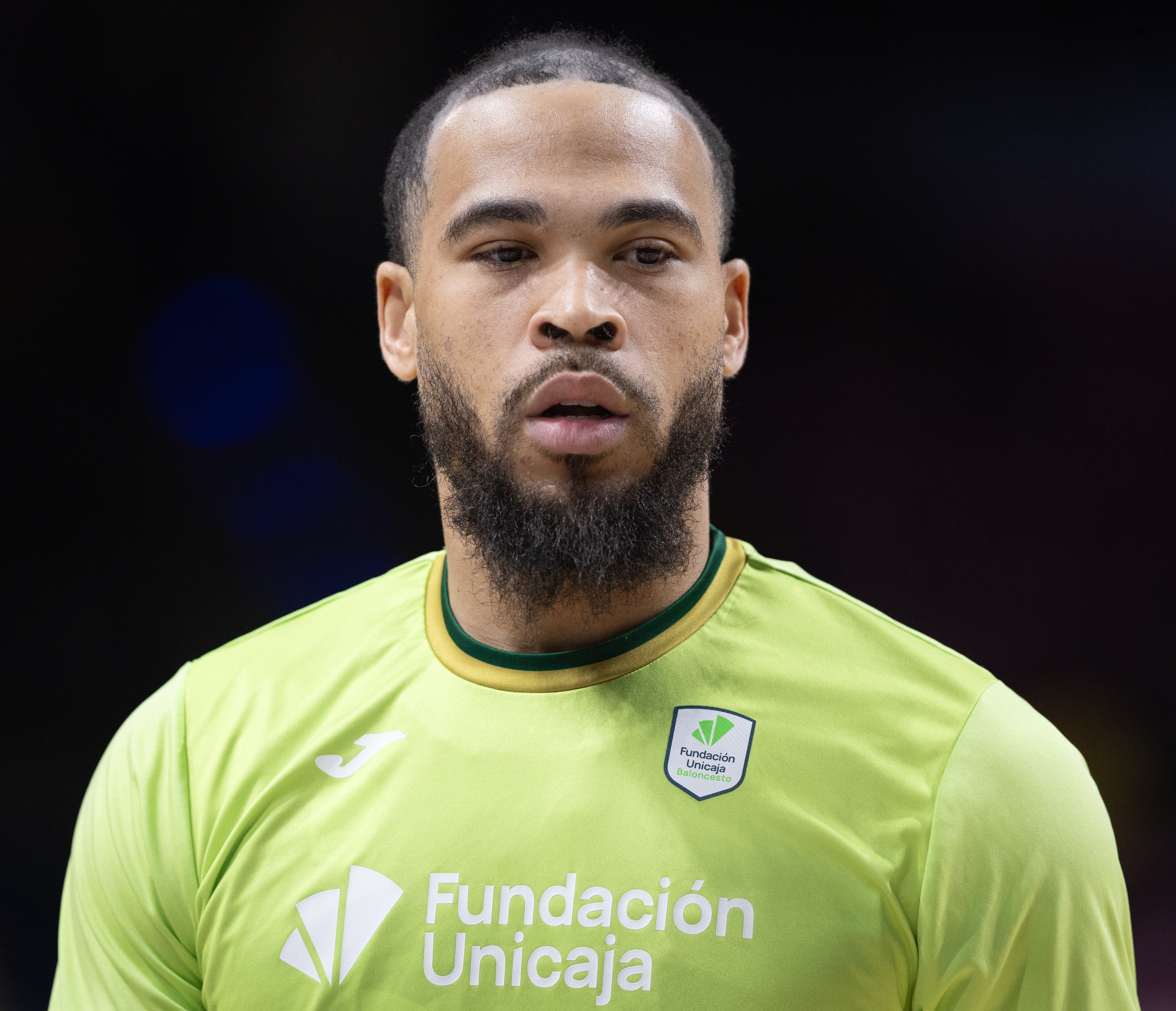
- Cobbs with Unicaja Málaga in 2026

No. 1 – Jilin Northeast Tigers
- Position: Point guard
- League: CBA

Personal information
- Born: March 16, 1991 (age 35) Los Angeles, California, U.S.
- Listed height: 6 ft 3 in (1.91 m)
- Listed weight: 208 lb (94 kg)

Career information
- High school: Bishop Montgomery (Torrance, California)
- College: Minnesota (2009–2010); California (2011–2014)
- NBA draft: 2014: undrafted
- Playing career: 2014–present

Career history
- 2014: VEF Rīga
- 2014–2015: Fraport Skyliners
- 2015: İstanbul BB
- 2015–2016: Bayern Munich
- 2016–2017: Gravelines-Dunkerque
- 2017–2018: Le Mans
- 2018–2019: Cedevita
- 2019–2022: Budućnost
- 2022–2023: Alvark Tokyo
- 2023–2024: Cedevita Olimpija
- 2024–2026: Mersin MSK
- 2026: Unicaja Málaga
- 2026–present: Jilin Northeast Tigers

Career highlights
- Pro A champion (2018); 2× Montenegrin League champion (2021, 2022); Slovenian League champion (2024); Croatian Cup winner (2019); 3× Montenegrin Cup winner (2020–2022); Slovenian Cup winner (2024); First-team All-Pac-12 (2014); Second-team All-Pac-12 (2013); Honorable mention All-Pac-12 (2012)
- Stats at Basketball Reference

Justin Cobbs (Montenegrin Cyrillic: Џастин Кобс; born March 16, 1991) is an American-born Montenegrin professional basketball player for the Jilin Northeast Tigers of the Chinese Basketball Association (CBA). He played college basketball for the Minnesota Golden Gophers and California Golde Bears. On February 17, 2014, Cobbs was named one of the finalists for the Bob Cousy Award, presented annually to the nation's top collegiate point guard. He is from Los Angeles, California, and attended Bishop Montgomery High School. He represents the Montenegro national team internationally.

== Professional career ==
Cobbs went undrafted in the 2014 NBA draft.

On November 3, 2014 he signed his first professional contract with VEF Rīga of the VTB League. On December 1, 2014, he signed with Fraport Skyliners of the Basketball Bundesliga for the remainder of the season. With Skyliners he reached the EuroChallenge Final Four.

On July 12, 2015 he signed with İstanbul BB of the Turkish Basketball Super League. On December 27, 2015, he left İstanbul and signed with German club Bayern Munich for the remainder of the season.

On June 6, 2016, Cobbs signed with BCM Gravelines for the 2016–17 season.

On July 24, 2017, Cobbs signed with Le Mans Sarthe Basket for the 2017–18 season.

On July 31, 2018, he signed with Croatian basketball champion Cedevita.

On August 13, 2019, he signed with Budućnost VOLI of the ABA League. On May 15, 2020, Cobbs signed a two-year extension with the club.

He signed with Alvark Tokyo of the Japanese B.League on August 2, 2022.

On September 5, 2024, he signed with Mersin MSK of the Basketbol Süper Ligi (BSL).

On February 1, 2026, he signed with Unicaja of the Liga ACB and the FIBA Champions League.

== National team career ==
On February 21, 2020, Cobbs debuted for the Montenegro national team in a win over the Great Britain.

== Personal life ==
He is good friends with NBA player Russell Westbrook.
