= RTV APR =

Local broadcasting company in Rožaje, Montenegro

Televizija APR (TV APR)
- Type: Broadcast radio, television and online
- Country: Montenegro
- Availability: Rožaje and Berane
- Owner: Šefkija Nurković
- Official website: www.rtvapr.com
- Language: Bosnian or Serbian

Radio Televizija APR (English: Radio Television APR) is a local broadcasting company based in Rožaje, Montenegro. The programme of RTV APR can be seen in the Rožaje and Berane.
