= 2016–17 Prva A liga =

Prva A Liga
- Teams: 11

Regular season
- Top seed: Teodo Tivat
- Relegated: Primorje

Finals
- Champions: Budućnost VOLI
- Runners-up: Mornar
- Semifinalists: Teodo Tivat; Lovćen

The 2016–17 Prva A Liga, known as Erste košarkaške lige by sponsorship reasons, is the 11th season of the Montenegrin Basketball League, the top tier basketball league on Montenegro. Budućnost VOLI is the defending champion.

== Competition format ==
Nine of the eleven teams that play the league join the regular season and play a three-round robin competition where the six first qualified teams join the playoffs with the two 2016–17 ABA League teams (Budućnost Voli and Mornar). The last qualified team is relegated.

== Regular season ==
Pos	Team	Pld	W	L	PF	PA	PD	Pts	Qualification
1	Teodo Tivat	24	21	3	1963	1692	+271	45	Qualification to the playoffs
2	Lovćen	24	16	8	1855	1644	+211	40	Qualification to the playoffs
3	Ibar Rožaje	24	16	8	1848	1775	+73	40	Qualification to the playoffs
4	Sutjeska	24	15	9	1915	1769	+146	39	Qualification to the playoffs
5	Ulcinj	24	13	11	1699	1683	+16	37	Qualification to the playoffs
6	Studenski centar	24	9	15	1812	1882	−70	33	Qualification to the playoffs
7	Jedinstvo	24	8	16	1747	1891	−144	32	
8	Danilovgrad	24	6	18	1636	1876	−240	30	
9	Primorje	24	4	20	1648	1911	−263	28	Relegated

Source: KSCG, Flashscore.com

== Playoffs ==
Budućnost VOLI and Mornar joined directly the playoffs as they participated in the 2016–17 ABA League. The finals were played with a 1-1-1-1-1 format, playing Budućnost VOLI games 1, 3 and 5 at home.

Quarter-finals
Budućnost VOLI	94	103
Studenski centar	70	75
Lovćen	75	80
Ibar Rožaje	72	76
Mornar	85	20
Ulcinj	68	0
Teodo Tivat	84	83
Sutjeska	65	77

Semi-finals
Budućnost VOLI	79	64
Lovćen	69	60
Mornar	70	91
Teodo Tivat	65	63

Final
Budućnost VOLI	78	62	78	66	76
Mornar	64	73	64	82	73
