= 2020–21 Prva A liga =

Prva A Liga
- Season: 2020–21
- Duration: 17 October 2020 – TBA
- Teams: 14

Finals
- Champions: Budućnost VOLI; 13th title
- Runners-up: Mornar

The 2020–21 Prva A Liga is the 15th season of the Montenegrin Basketball League, the top tier basketball league on Montenegro. No team from the last season was relegated, while KK Podgorica and KK Pljevlja were promoted. In this season, 8 teams from Montenegro will participate in basketball international competitions which have been the most ever.

== Competition format ==
Twelve of the fourteen teams that play the league join the regular season and play a two-round robin competition where the six first qualified teams supposed to join the Super Liga with the two 2020–21 ABA League teams (Budućnost Voli and Mornar). The last three qualified teams will be relegated to the Prva B.

Super Liga was cancelled and playoff semifinal with first two teams from regular season along with Budućnost Voli and Mornar will determine the champion.

== Teams ==
Locations of the 2020–21 Prva A Liga teams

Club	City	Arena
All Stars	Podgorica	
Budućnost VOLI	Podgorica	Morača
Danilovgrad	Danilovgrad	
Ibar	Rožaje	Bandžovo Brdo
Jedinstvo	Bijelo Polje	
Lovćen	Cetinje	
Mornar	Bar	Topolica
Pljevlja	Pljevlja	
Podgorica	Podgorica	Bemax Arena
Primorje	Herceg Novi	
Studentski centar	Podgorica	
Sutjeska	Nikšić	Nikšić Sports Center
Teodo	Tivat	Dvorana Župa Tivat
Zeta	Golubovci	

Teams that play in the 2020–21 First Adriatic League
Teams that play in the 2020–21 Adriatic League Second Division
Teams that play in the 2020–21 Balkan League

== Regular season ==
=== League table ===
Pos	Team	Pld	W	L	PF	PA	PD	Pts	Qualification
1	Studentski Centar	22	19	3	1938	1581	+357	41	Qualification to the Playoffs
2	Lovćen 1947	22	19	3	1957	1660	+297	41	Qualification to the Playoffs and ABA 2 League
3	Sutjeska	22	17	5	1990	1623	+367	39	Qualification to the ABA 2 League
4	Podgorica	22	16	6	1805	1631	+174	38	
5	Primorje	22	12	10	1819	1792	+27	34	
6	Ibar	22	11	11	1809	1722	+87	33	
7	Teodo	22	11	11	1864	1837	+27	33	
8	Jedinstvo	22	10	12	1781	1799	−18	32	
9	Danilovgrad	22	7	15	1662	1870	−208	29	
10	All Stars	22	6	16	1646	1917	−271	28	Relegated
11	Zeta	22	2	20	1611	1990	−379	24	Relegated
12	Pljevlja	22	2	20	1533	1993	−460	24	Relegated

Source: Montenegrin Basketball Federation

Notes

1. Studentski centar already qualified to the 2021-22 ABA League first division.

== Playoffs ==
Semifinals were played in a best-of-three-games format, while the finals in a best-of-five.

Semifinals
1	Budućnost VOLI	2
4	Lovćen	0
2	Mornar	2
3	Studentski centar	0

Final
1	Budućnost VOLI	3
2	Mornar	0

== Montenegrin clubs in European competitions ==
Team	Competition	Progress
Budućnost VOLI	EuroCup	Quarterfinals
Mornar	EuroCup	Top 16
