= KK ABS Primorje =

KK Primorje 1945 Herceg Novi is a professional basketball club from Herceg Novi, Montenegro. The team currently competes in Prva A Liga, the top-tier professional basketball league in Montenegro. A school for all ages and categories has been organized within the club.
