= 2018–19 Prva A liga =

Prva A Liga
- Season: 2018–19
- Duration: 27 October 2018 – 29 May 2019
- Teams: 11

Finals
- Champions: Budućnost VOLI; 12th title
- Runners-up: Mornar
- Semifinalists: Sutjeska; Lovćen

The 2018–19 Prva A Liga, known as Erste košarkaške lige by sponsorship reasons, is the 13th season of the Montenegrin Basketball League, the top tier basketball league on Montenegro. Mornar is the defending champion.

== Competition format ==
Nine of the eleven teams that play the league join the regular season and play a two-round robin competition where the six first qualified teams join the Super Liga with the two 2018–19 ABA League teams (Budućnost Voli and Mornar). The last qualified team would play a relegation playoff against the second qualified of the Prva B.

== Teams ==
Locations of the 2018–19 Prva A Liga teams

Club	City	Arena
Budućnost VOLI	Podgorica	Morača
Danilovgrad	Danilovgrad	
Ibar	Rožaje	Bandžovo Brdo
Jedintsvo	Bijelo Polje	
Lovćen	Cetinje	
Mornar	Bar	Topolica
Primorje	Herceg Novi	
Studenski centar	Bijelo Polje	
Sutjeska	Nikšić	Nikšić Sports Center
Ulcinj	Ulcinj	
Zeta	Golubovci	

== Regular season ==
=== League table ===
Pos	Team	Pld	W	L	PF	PA	PD	Pts	Qualification
1	Lovćen	16	16	0	1389	1060	+329	32	Qualification to the Super Liga
2	Sutjeska	16	11	5	1256	1177	+79	27	Qualification to the Super Liga
3	Ulcinj	16	10	6	1290	1173	+117	26	Qualification to the Super Liga
4	Jedinstvo	16	9	7	1204	1261	−57	25	Qualification to the Super Liga
5	Ibar	16	8	8	1219	1196	+23	24	Qualification to the relegation group
6	Studenski centar	16	6	10	1155	1195	−40	22	Qualification to the relegation group
7	Zeta	16	5	11	1224	1370	−146	21	Qualification to the relegation group
8	Danilovgrad	16	4	12	1120	1296	−176	20	Qualification to the relegation group
9	Primorje	16	3	13	1191	1320	−129	19	Qualification to the relegation group

Source: Montenegrin Basketball Federation

=== Results ===
Home \ Away	DAN	IBA	JED	LOV	PRI	STU	SUT	ULC	ZET
Danilovgrad	—	50–71	78–76	66–90	80–69	77–71	75–80	62–72	86–90
Ibar	65–70	—	97–75	59–75	92–77	78–68	78–80	86–73	76–73
Jedinstvo	77–72	72–62	—	64–81	84–75	79–68	78–70	67–86	86–84
Lovćen	94–52	85–73	93–73	—	101–58	91–76	79–71	83–75	99–60
Primorje	96–76	80–84	71–77	77–91	—	78–70	61–79	63–73	93–80
Studenski centar	85–67	83–78	55–68	56–73	94–65	—	61–76	74–71	74–76
Sutjeska	91–64	81–66	93–68	73–87	69–65	58–83	—	88–83	77–90
Ulcinj	87–68	86–72	94–68	54–73	80–74	90–64	83–81	—	99–63
Zeta	82–77	68–82	82–92	73–94	90–89	70–73	76–89	87–84	—

Source: Montenegrin Basketball Federation
Legend: Blue = home team win; Red = away team win.

== Super Liga ==
=== League table ===
Pos	Team	Pld	W	L	PF	PA	PD	Pts	Qualification
1	Budućnost VOLI	10	8	2	952	793	+159	18	Qualification to the playoffs
2	Mornar	10	7	3	907	824	+83	17	Qualification to the playoffs
3	Sutjeska	10	7	3	843	804	+39	17	Qualification to the playoffs
4	Lovćen	10	6	4	827	816	+11	16	Qualification to the playoffs
5	Ulcinj	10	2	8	804	873	−69	12	
6	Jedinstvo	10	0	10	737	960	−223	10	

=== Results ===
Home \ Away	BUD	MOR	SUT	LOV	ULC	JED
Budućnost VOLI	—	95–98	94–84	104–78	110–63	107–66
Mornar	95–96	—	106–87	90–77	90–74	102–80
Sutjeska	84–74	90–84	—	103–78	76–68	79–60
Lovćen	64–75	76–71	79–62	—	108–88	98–71
Ulcinj	84–92	78–85	77–79	77–80	—	99–71
Jedinstvo	77–105	71–86	84–99	75–89	82–96	—

Updated to match(es) played on 1 May 2019. Source:
Legend: Blue = home team win; Red = away team win.

== Relegation group ==
=== League table ===
Pos	Team	Pld	W	L	PF	PA	PD	Pts	Qualification
1	Ibar	8	7	1	701	574	+127	15	
2	Primorje	8	5	3	616	568	+48	13	
3	Danilovgrad	8	3	5	585	621	−36	11	
4	Studenski centar	8	3	5	594	640	−46	11	Qualification to the relegation playoffs
5	Zeta	8	2	6	553	646	−93	10	Qualification to the relegation playoffs

Source: Montenegrin Basketball Federation

=== Results ===
Home \ Away	IBA	PRI	DAN	STU	ZET
Ibar	—	88–80	95–80	81–68	102–57
Primorje	76–67	—	79–83	84–71	80–67
Danilovgrad	74–92	58–53	—	69–75	83–62
Studenski centar	75–104	69–77	82–70	—	73–69
Zeta	64–72	65–87	83–68	86–81	—

Source: Montenegrin Basketball Federation
Legend: Blue = home team win; Red = away team win.

== Playoffs ==
Semifinals will be played in a best-of-three-games format, while the finals in a best-of-five one.

Semifinals
1	Budućnost VOLI	2
4	Lovćen	0
2	Mornar	2
3	Sutjeska	1

Final
1	Budućnost VOLI	3
2	Mornar	2

=== Semifinals ===
Team 1	Series	Team 2	Game 1	Game 2	Game 3
Budućnost VOLI	2–0	Lovćen	95–90	89–84	–
Mornar	2–1	Sutjeska	88–74	73–75	83–75

=== Finals ===
Team 1	Series	Team 2	Game 1	Game 2	Game 3	Game 4	Game 5
Budućnost VOLI	3–2	Mornar	102–68	84–74	68–76	76–94	76–72

== Montenegrin clubs in European competitions ==
Team	Competition	Progress
Budućnost VOLI	EuroLeague	Regular season
Mornar	EuroCup	Regular season
