= KK Zeta 2011 =

KK Zeta 2011 is a professional basketball club from Zeta, Montenegro. The team currently competes in First Erste League. In the season 2012/13, Zeta 2011 won the championship title of Prva B Liga when they qualified for the First league.
