= KK Centar =

KK Centar was a professional basketball club from Bijelo Polje, Montenegro. The team competed in First Erste League. A school for all ages and categories has been organized within the club.
