= KK Ulcinj =

- Founded: 1976
- Location: Ulcinj, Montenegro
- Team colors: Blue, White
- President: Zoran Piperović
- Head coach: Darko Vujacic
Home	Away

KK Ulcinj (Cyrillic: КК Улцињ; Albanian: KB Ulqini) is a professional basketball club from the city of Ulcinj, Montenegro. The club currently participates in the Montenegrin Basketball League. They also took part in the Balkan International Basketball League twice. They were finalist of Montenegrin Cup once and were several times in semifinals of Montenegrin championship play-offs.

== Notable players ==
- (Albania) Çelis Taflaj
- (Montenegro) Marko Popović
- (Montenegro) Darko Vujačić
