= Prva A Liga =

Top-tier professional basketball league in Montenegro

Prva A liga
- Founded: 2006; 20 years ago
- First season: 2006–07
- Country: Montenegro
- Confederation: FIBA Europe
- Number of teams: 16
- Level on pyramid: 1
- Relegation to: Prva B Liga
- Current champions: Budućnost (18th title) (2025–26)
- Most championships: Budućnost (18 titles)
- CEO: Veselin Brajovic
- TV partners: Adriatic sports
- Website: www.kscg.me

The Prva A liga, for sponsorships reasons named the Erste Liga, is the top-tier professional basketball league in Montenegro. It is the highest basketball division organized by the Basketball Association of Montenegro (KSCG). It was established in 2006. shortly after Montenegro declared its independence from Serbia and Montenegro.

The league is sponsored by and named after Erste Bank. Currently, two clubs from the area are playing in the regional ABA League. The most successful club in the Prva A liga is Budućnost Podgorica, which has won 14 titles, after winning the 2022 championship.

== History ==
=== Before independence ===
During their history, many Montenegrin basketball clubs played in the top-tier basketball leagues of SFR Yugoslavia, FR Yugoslavia, and Serbia and Montenegro, including Budućnost, Lovćen, Sutjeska, Mornar, KK Primorka, KK Berane, Jedinstvo, and KK Temko Nikšić.

=== 1946–1991: SFR Yugoslavia ===
From 1946 to 1991, two clubs from Montenegro, Berane (formerly KK Ivangrad) and Budućnost, played in the First Federal Basketball League. Others played in the Second Yugoslav League (during the 80's - First B League) and the Republic League.

Budućnost played in the First League during the nine seasons, with third place on the 1985–86 season as their biggest success at that time.

Below is the list of all-time participants of Montenegrin clubs in the First Yugoslav League.

Club	66	81	82	83	84	85	86	87	88	91
Berane	12	-	-	-	-	-	-	-	-	-
Budućnost	-	8	8	10	8	7	3	9	12	10

=== 1992–2006: Serbia and Montenegro ===
After the breakup of SFR Yugoslavia, until the Montenegrin independence in 2006, eight different Montenegrin teams participated in the First League of FR Yugoslavia / Serbia and Montenegro (YUBA League). Budućnost is the only team which played every single season in that competition, winning the three champion titles. Except them, Lovćen, Mornar, Sutjeska and Primorka are the only teams which participated in more than one season at the highest rank.

During that period, Budućnost became a founder of ABA League, too, where they play an important role until today. At the same time, Budućnost played its first seasons in Euroleague with the quarterfinals as their biggest success in the history of competition.

Below is the list of all-time participants of Montenegrin clubs in the YUBA League.

Club	92	93	94	95	96	97	98	99	00	01	02	03	04	05	06
Budućnost	10	10	11	16	2	4	2	1	1	1	2	4	5	7	6
Lovćen	-	9	10	14	11	8	6	9	9	4	5	6	8	18	-
Mornar	-	-	7	11	12	7	14	-	-	-	-	-	-	12	9
Sutjeska	-	-	-	8	-	-	-	-	12	-	-	-	-	16	-
Jedinstvo	-	-	-	15	-	-	-	-	-	-	-	-	-	-	-
Berane	-	-	-	27	-	-	-	-	-	-	-	-	-	-	-
Temko	-	-	-	29	-	-	-	-	-	-	-	-	-	-	-
Primorka	-	-	-	-	-	-	-	-	-	-	11	-	-	-	17

As the most successful Montenegrin basketball team, Budućnost won three national titles in the First League of Yugoslavia.

Club	Winners	Runners-up	Winning years
KK Budućnost Podgorica	3	1	1998–99, 1999–00, 2000–01

=== After independence ===
Soon after the Montenegrin independence referendum, Basketball Federation of Montenegro founded its own competitions, with the First League as a top-tier competition. During the all history, KK Budućnost was strongly dominant side.
Every season have two parts. During the first part, 8 to 10 clubs are playing league, without teams who are playing in ABA League. Until the season 2019-2020, in the second part, four best-placed teams from the league and two Montenegrin clubs from ABA League were competing in Superliga and four best-placed sides from that phase were participating in playoffs. Final series of playoffs is lasting until three wins of one opponent.
From season 2006-07 to 2016-17, every single champions' title won KK Budućnost. From 2006 to 2012, team from Podgorica created an impressive row of 89 wins with only one defeat in domestic championship. Except that, until 2015, team from Podgorica won every playoff final series with 3-0.
On season 2015-16, during the regular phase of the championship, game between KK Ulcinj and KK Jedinstvo finished with result 127-23. That was the biggest victory in the history of Montenegrin Championship. Except that, KK Ulcinj's player Miloš Popović on the same game scored 59 points, which is another all-time record of Montenegrin League. An unexpected change came on season 2017-18, when KK Mornar won their first ever national title. In the finals, they surprisingly won the series against ABA League title holder - KK Budućnost (3-1).
Budućnost made a comeback on season 2018-19, defeating Mornar in the finals. During 2019, Montenegrin basketball federation implemented a new system of competition. Instead Superliga as the second phase, two best teams from the first part of season and two Montenegrin representatives in ABA League are directly qualifying for the playoff series.
Season 2019-20 was interrupted after 20 weeks, due to the coronavirus pandemic and Montenegrin basketball federation decided to erase every single result from that edition of competition.

== Champions ==
Since the establishing of competition, only two teams won the titles of Montenegrin champion. In 2018, Mornar was the second team to win the league after a streak of 11 consecutive trophies achieved by Budućnost.

=== Titles by season ===
Below is the list of final series of Montenegrin Basketball League playoffs.

Season	Champion	Score	Runner-up	Champion's Coach	Player of the season
2006–07	Budućnost	3–0	Lovćen	(Montenegro) Dejan Radonjić	(Serbia) Vladimir Micov (Budućnost)
2007–08	Budućnost	3–0	Mogren	(Montenegro) Dejan Radonjić	(Serbia) Nikola Otašević (Budućnost)
2008–09	Budućnost	3–0	Primorje	(Montenegro) Dejan Radonjić	(Serbia) Nikola Otašević (Budućnost)
2009–10	Budućnost	3–0	Lovćen	(Montenegro) Dejan Radonjić	(Serbia) Čedomir Vitkovac (Budućnost)
2010–11	Budućnost	3–0	Mornar	(Montenegro) Dejan Radonjić	(Montenegro) Vladimir Dragičević (Budućnost)
2011–12	Budućnost	3–0	Sutjeska	(Montenegro) Dejan Radonjić	(Montenegro) Bojan Dubljević (Budućnost)
2012–13	Budućnost	3–0	Sutjeska	(Montenegro) Dejan Radonjić	(Montenegro) Aleksa Popović (Budućnost)
2013–14	Budućnost	3–0	Zeta	(Montenegro) Igor Jovović	(Montenegro) Suad Šehović (Budućnost)
2014–15	Budućnost	3–1	Sutjeska	(Montenegro) Igor Jovović	(United States) J. R. Reynolds (Budućnost)
2015–16	Budućnost	3–1	Mornar	(Montenegro) Igor Đaletić	(United States) Julius Jenkins (Budućnost)
2016–17	Budućnost	3–2	Mornar	(Montenegro) Igor Đaletić	(Bosnia and Herzegovina) Nemanja Gordić (Budućnost)
2017–18	Mornar	3–1	Budućnost	(Montenegro) Mihailo Pavićević	(United States) Derek Needham (Mornar)
2018–19	Budućnost	3–2	Mornar	(Montenegro) Petar Mijović	
2019–20	Canceled due to the coronavirus pandemic				
2020–21	Budućnost	3–0	Mornar	(Serbia) Dejan Milojević	
2021–22	Budućnost	3–2	Mornar	(Serbia) Aleksandar Džikić	
2022–23	Budućnost	3–0	Studentski Centar	(Montenegro) Petar Mijović	
2023–24	Budućnost	3–1	SC Derby	(Slovenia) Andrej Žakelj	
2024–25	Budućnost	2–0	SC Derby	(Slovenia) Andrej Žakelj	
2025–26	Budućnost	2–0	SC Derby	(Slovenia) Andrej Žakelj	

=== Titles by Club ===
==== Montenegrin League ====
Below is a list of clubs with titles won in Montenegrin Basketball League.

Club	Titles	Runners-up	Years won
Budućnost	18	1	2007, 2008, 2009, 2010, 2011, 2012, 2013, 2014, 2015, 2016, 2017, 2019, 2021, 2022, 2023, 2024, 2025, 2026
Mornar	1	6	2018

==== Overall ====
Below is an overall list, with titles won in both leagues - Montenegrin Basketball League and FR Yugoslavia / Serbia and Montenegro Championship.

Club	Titles	Runners-up	Years won
Budućnost	21	2	1998–99, 1999–00, 2000–01, from 2006–07 to 2016–17, 2018–19, 2020–21, 2021–22, 2022–23, 2023–24, 2024–25, 2025-26
Mornar	1	6	2018

== Performances by clubs ==
=== Final placements ===
Since establishing, in Montenegrin basketball league participated 21 different teams. Club which played every single season until now are KK Budućnost, KK Jedinstvo, KK Lovćen, KK Mornar and KK Ulcinj.

Club	07	08	09	10	11	12	13	14	15	16	17	18	19	21	22
ABS Primorje	-	4	5	8	9	7	9	9	11	-	-	-	-	-	-
All Stars	-	-	-	-	-	-	-	-	-	-	-	-	-	12	-
Budućnost	1	1	1	1	1	1	1	1	1	1	1	2	1	1	1
Centar	-	-	-	-	-	-	11	11	-	-	-	-	-	-	-
Danilovgrad	5	6	4	7	7	10	10	-	9	10	10	9	10	11	9
Gorštak	-	-	-	6	10	-	-	-	-	-	-	-	-	-	-
Ibar	-	-	-	-	-	-	8	7	5	7	5	7	7	8	11
Jedinstvo	8	9	9	10	6	9	7	8	8	8	9	8	6	10	6
Lovćen	2	5	7	2	3	4	6	6	10	6	4	4	4	4	7
Ljubović	-	-	-	-	11	-	-	-	-	-	-	-	-	-	-
Mornar	4	8	6	3	2	3	5	2	4	2	2	1	2	2	2
Mogren	7	2	8	9	8	-	-	-	-	-	-	-	-	-	-
Milenijum	-	-	-	-	-	-	-	-	-	-	-	-	-	-	10
Podgorica	-	-	-	-	-	8	-	-	-	-	-	-	-	6	4
Pljevlja	-	-	-	-	-	-	-	-	-	-	-	-	-	13	-
Primorje 1945	-	11	2	11	-	-	-	-	-	-	11	10	8	7	8
Rudar	-	10	10	-	-	-	-	-	-	-	-	-	-	-	-
SC Derby	-	-	-	-	-	-	-	-	-	9	8	11	9	3	3
Stršljen	-	-	-	-	-	-	-	-	-	11	-	-	-	-	-
Sutjeska	6	3	11	-	-	2	2	5	2	3	6	3	3	5	5
Teodo	-	-	-	5	5	6	3	4	3	4	3	5	-	9	12
Ulcinj	3	7	3	4	4	5	4	10	7	5	7	6	5	-	-
Zeta	-	-	-	-	-	-	-	2	6	-	-	-	11	14	-

=== All-time table ===
All-time Montenegrin First League table is a ranking of all Montenegrin basketball clubs based on their performance in national top tier. Highlighted clubs played in the First League in the 2021/22 season.

Rank	Club	Town	Seasons^{a}	Games^{b}	W	L	Win%	PO Apps
1	KK Budućnost	Podgorica	15	211	194	17	92%	15
2	KK Mornar	Bar	15	354	224	130	63%	12
3	KK Lovćen	Cetinje	15	409	252	157	62%	8
4	KK Podgorica	Podgorica	3	67	39	28	58%	1
5	KK Teodo	Tivat	11	290	162	128	58%	5
6	KK Sutjeska	Nikšić	13	338	194	144	57%	7
7	KK Ulcinj	Ulcinj	13	359	189	170	53%	5
8	KK Ibar	Rožaje	9	209	97	112	47%	0
9	KK Mogren	Budva	5	137	63	74	46%	1
10	SC Derby	Podgorica	6	131	59	72	45%	2
11	KK Jedinstvo	Bijelo Polje	15	366	148	218	41%	0
12	KK Danilovgrad	Danilovgrad	14	336	131	205	39%	1
13	KK Zeta	Golubovci	4	107	40	67	38%	1
14	KK ABS Primorje	Herceg Novi	8	209	76	133	36%	1
15	KK Primorje 1945	Herceg Novi	8	188	66	122	35%	1
16	KK Milenijum	Podgorica	1	17	6	11	35%	0
17	KK Gorštak	Kolašin	2	54	15	39	28%	0
18	All Stars	Spuž	1	22	6	16	27%	0
19	KK Centar	Bijelo Polje	2	52	12	40	23%	0
20	KK Ljubović	Podgorica	1	18	3	15	17%	0
21	KK Rudar	Pljevlja	2	52	7	45	14%	0
22	KK Stršljen	Gusinje	1	24	3	21	13%	0
22	Pljevlja	Pljevlja	1	22	2	20	9%	0

^aIncluding current season (2021/22)
^bPlayout games against teams from Prva B Liga are not counted

== Attendances by season ==
Season	Avg	Overall	M	H	CH	CL
2006–07	562	64,700	115	2,500	Ulcinj (1,071)	Nikšić (379)
2007–08	452	66,900	148	2,000	Ulcinj (736)	Primorje 1945 (313)
2008–09	456	69,700	153	1,500	Ulcinj (1,006)	Nikšić (257)
2009–10	493	75,400	153	2,000	Ulcinj (1,113)	Primorje 1945 (271)
2010–11	497	70,600	142	1,700	Teodo (950)	Ljubović (222)
2011–12	429	55,800	130	1,500	Teodo (692)	Podgorica (131)
2012–13	514	78,150	152	2,500	Ulcinj (840)	Primorje 1945 (214)
2013–14	426	64,800	152	1,500	Ibar (686)	Centar (214)
2014–15	485	74,100	153	3,000	Ibar (1,086)	Zeta (207)
2015–16	579	71,200	123	3,000	Ibar (1,050)	S. Centar (127)
2016–17	497	62,200	125	3,000	Mornar (1,675)	S. Centar (119)
2017–18	645	70,950	110	3,500	Mornar (1,487)	S. Centar (106)
2018–19	569	75,100	132	3,000	Mornar (1,222)	Zeta (108)
2019–20	Canceled due to the coronavirus pandemic					
2019–20	Without attendance due to the coronavirus pandemic					

M = Number of matches (only matches with spectators counted); H = Highest attendance on one match; CH = Club with highest average attendance; CL = Club with lowest average attendance

== Current season ==
Locations of the 2020–21 Prva A Liga teams

=== Competition format ===
Eleven of the fourteen teams that play the league join the regular season. After that phase, two best teams from the regular season are qualifying for the playoffs, where they play against the two 2020–21 ABA League teams (Budućnost Voli and Mornar).Except that, two best teams from regular season are qualifying for the next season of ABA 2 League. The last qualified team is relegated to Prva B Liga.

=== Teams ===
Club	City	Arena	Capacity
Budućnost VOLI	Podgorica	Morača	6,000
Danilovgrad	Danilovgrad	Gradska dvorana	1,200
Ibar	Rožaje	Bandžovo Brdo	2,500
Jedintsvo	Bijelo Polje	SC Nikoljac	3,000
Lovćen	Cetinje	SRC Lovćen	1,500
Mornar	Bar	Topolica	3,500
Pljevlja	Pljevlja	SC Ada	3,000
Podgorica	Podgorica	Bemax Arena	2,000
Primorje	Herceg Novi	SC Igalo	2,000
Studenski centar	Podgorica	University Sports Center	1,500
Sutjeska	Nikšić	Nikšić Sports Center	3,000
All Star	Spuž	Academy Danilovgrad	600
Teodo	Tivat	Župa SC	1,500
Zeta	Golubovci	House of basketball	500

== Montenegrin basketball clubs in ABA League ==
Clubs from Montenegrin League are permanent participants of ABA League, one of strongest team competitions in Europe. In 2001, one of founders was Montenegrin side Budućnost Podgorica, which is among most successful members of competition. Except Budućnost, in ABA League played three other clubs from Montenegro - Lovćen, Sutjeska and Mornar.
KK Budućnost won ABA champions’ title on season 2017-18, which is the most significant success of Montenegrin clubs in that competition until now.
Except that, Budućnost was a finalist on season 2018-19 and played seven times in semifinals (five times lost the game or series), while Mornar played once in that phase of playoffs.
Below is list of participation of Montenegrin clubs by every season of ABA League.

Season	Club	Pos	P	W	L	Note
2001–02	Budućnost Podgorica	9	22	9	13	
2003–04	Budućnost Podgorica	5	26	16	10	
2003–04	Lovćen Cetinje	14	26	5	21	Relegated
2004–05	Budućnost Podgorica	14	30	9	21	Relegated
2006–07	Budućnost Podgorica	5	26	16	10	
2007–08	Budućnost Podgorica	6	29	16	13	Playoffs: Quarterfinals
2008–09	Budućnost Podgorica	6	26	15	11	
2009–10	Budućnost Podgorica	5	26	15	11	
2010–11	Budućnost Podgorica	4	27	15	12	Final four: Semifinals
2011–12	Budućnost Podgorica	4	27	18	9	Final four: Semifinals
2012–13	Budućnost Podgorica	5	26	16	10	
2013–14	Budućnost Podgorica	5	26	15	11	
2014–15	Budućnost Podgorica	3	31	21	10	Playoffs: Semifinals
2015–16	Budućnost Podgorica	3	28	23	5	Playoffs: Semifinals
2015–16	Sutjeska Nikšić	13	26	9	17	Relegated
2016–17	Budućnost Podgorica	4	29	19	10	Playoffs: Semifinals
2016–17	Mornar Bar	8	26	10	16	
2017–18	Budućnost Podgorica	1	29	22	7	Playoffs: Champions
2017–18	Mornar Bar	4	25	15	10	Playoffs: Semifinals
2018–19	Budućnost Podgorica	2	30	20	10	Playoffs: Finals
2018–19	Mornar Bar	9	22	8	14	
2020–21	Budućnost Podgorica	2	26	22	4	Playoffs: Finals
2020–21	Mornar Bar	3	26	19	7	Playoffs: Semifinals
2021–22	Budućnost Podgorica	3	26	19	7	Playoffs: Semifinals
2021–22	SC Derby	7	26	12	14	
2021–22	Mornar Bar	9	26	10	16	
2022–23	Budućnost Podgorica	3	26	18	8	Playoffs: Semifinals
2022–23	SC Derby	8	26	11	15	Playoffs: Quarterfinals
2022–23	Mornar Bar	12	26	8	18	
2023–24	Budućnost Podgorica	3	26	19	7	Playoffs: Semifinals
2023–24	SC Derby	8	26	11	15	Playoffs: Quarterfinals
2023–24	Mornar Bar	13	26	6	20	
2024–25	Budućnost Podgorica	1	30	26	4	Playoffs: Finals
2024–25	SC Derby	11	30	11	19	
2024–25	Mornar Bar	16	30	2	28	Relegated
2025–26	Budućnost Podgorica	4	24	18	6	Playoffs: Semifinals
2025–26	SC Derby	16	26	9	17	

== European competitions ==
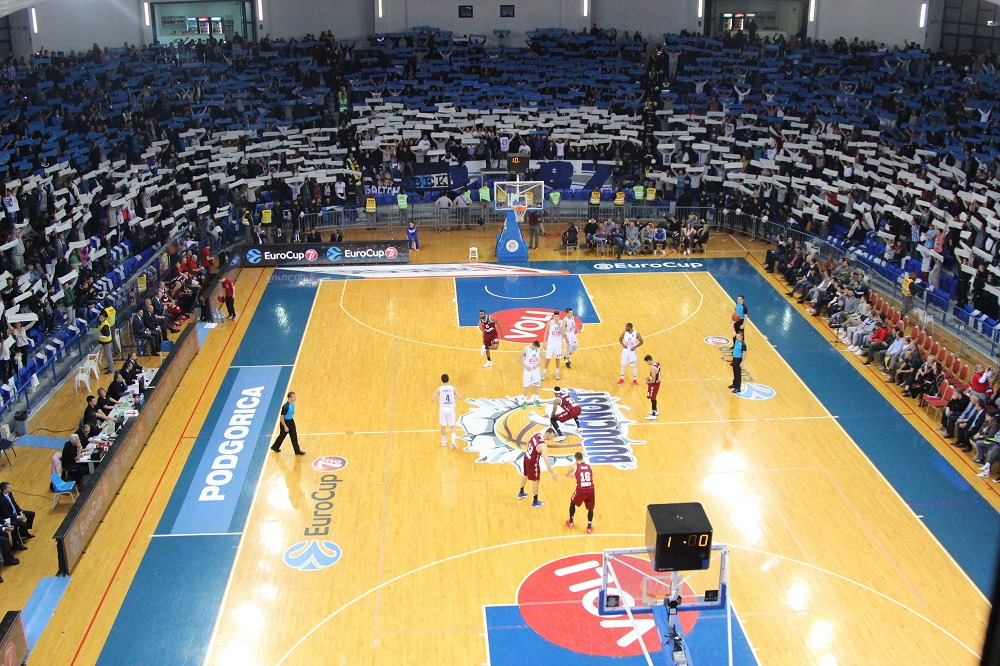
A EuroCup home game of Budućnost Podgorica, which represents Montenegro each season

Clubs from Montenegro have been playing in European basketball competitions since the 1980s. Until 2006, they represented SFR Yugoslavia and FR Yugoslavia. Almost all European seasons by Montenegrin clubs are played by KK Budućnost. Exceptions are three seasons played by KK Mornar Bar and one European performance by KK Lovćen Cetinje.

The most successful period was the end of the 1990s and the beginning of new century. At that time, KK Budućnost played in the finish phases of EuroLeague. In that period, Budućnost often played games against greatest European basketball teams like FC Barcelona, Real Madrid, CSKA Moscow, Panathinaikos, Olympiacos, Maccabi Tel Aviv.

Budućnost made their comeback to Euroleague on season 2018-19, with few impressive results as wins against CSKA Moscow, Real Madrid and FC Barcelona.

During the overall history, three different Montenegrin clubs played in FIBA/ULEB competitions. KK Budućnost played in numerous competitions (Euroleague, Eurocup/ULEB Cup, Saporta Cup/FIBA EuroCup, FIBA Korać Cup). KK Mornar played in ULEB EuroCup, Basketball Champions League and FIBA Europe Cup, while KK Lovćen played one season in FIBA Korać Cup.

=== Records ===
As of the end of FIBA/ULEB competitions 2019–20 season.

Team	Seasons	First	Last	G	W	L
KK Budućnost Podgorica	23	1986-87	2019-20	285	107	178
KK Mornar Bar	4	2016-17	2019-20	58	19	39
KK Lovćen Cetinje	1	1998-99	1998-99	6	1	5

== See also ==
- ABA League
- Second Basketball League
- Montenegrin Basketball Cup
- Montenegrin Women's Basketball League
