= 2018–19 ABA League First Division =

ABA League First Division
- Season: 2018–19
- Duration: September 28, 2018 – March 17, 2019 (Regular season); March 23, 2019–April 22, 2019 (Playoffs)
- Games played: 143
- Teams: 12
- TV partners: Arena Sport, O2.TV

Regular season
- Top seed: (Serbia) Crvena zvezda mts
- Season MVP: (Georgia (country)) Goga Bitadze ^{[1]}
- Relegated: (Slovenia) Petrol Olimpija

Finals
- Champions: (Serbia) Crvena zvezda mts (4th title)
- Runners-up: (Montenegro) Budućnost VOLI
- Semi-finalists: (Croatia) Cedevita (Serbia) Partizan NIS
- Finals MVP: (United States) Billy Baron ^{[2]}

Awards
- Top Prospect: (Georgia (country)) Goga Bitadze ^{[3]}

Statistical leaders
Points	(Serbia) Dragan Apić	21.29
Rebounds	(Croatia) Luka Božić	7.23
Assists	(Slovenia) Matic Rebec	5.84
Index Rating	(Serbia) Dragan Apić	29.50

Records
- Biggest home win: Crvena zvezda 97–54 Budućnost (22 April 2019)
- Biggest away win: Mornar 57–90 Crvena zvezda (9 February 2019)
- Highest scoring: Igokea 115–105 Olimpija (16 November 2018)
- Winning streak: Crvena zvezda 16 games
- Losing streak: Olimpija / Mornar; 5 games
- Highest attendance: 8,000; Zadar 92–97 Partizan (19 January 2019)
- Lowest attendance: 500; Igokea 91–73 Krka (26 October 2018); Krka 69–71 Igokea (18 January 2019); Cedevita 94–80 Mornar (15 March 2019); FMP 73–72 Partizan (16 March 2019)
- Attendance: 384,820
- Average attendance: 2,691
- All statistics correct as of April 22, 2019.

The 2018–19 ABA League First Division is the 18th season of the ABA League with 12 teams from Bosnia and Herzegovina, Croatia, Montenegro, Slovenia and Serbia participating in it. It is the first time since the 2011–12 season that there are no participants from North Macedonia.

== Format changes ==
On March 13, 2018, the Adriatic League Assembly decided to abolish the National standings and, as of the 2018–19 season, participants are determined only based on the results in the competitions under the umbrella of the Adriatic League (First Division and Second Division). Promotion and relegation will now be based on the First and Second Division. The last place team in the First Division is relegated to the Second Division, while the winner of the Second Division is promoted. Also, as of the 2018–19 season, the 11th placed team of the 2018–19 First Division season and the runners-up of the 2018–19 Second Division season will play in a Relegation Playoff for a spot in the 2019–20 First Division season. The format of the Qualifiers will be best of three, while the home court advantage will be given to the team that played in the First Division in the previous season.

The maximum number of clubs from one country in the First Division is five. The last placed club in the First Division will have a guaranteed place in the Second Division in the following season. The confirmed competition system shall not be changed until the end of the 2024–25 season, if there are no significant changes in the European basketball by then.

== Teams ==
=== Promotion and relegation ===
A total of 12 teams will contest the league, including 11 sides from the 2017–18 season and one promoted from the 2017–18 Second Division.

Team promoted from Second Division

- (Slovenia) Krka

Team relegated to Second Division

- (North Macedonia) MZT Skopje Aerodrom

=== Venues and locations ===
Location of teams in the 2018–19 ABA League First Division

Team	Home city	Arena	Capacity
(Montenegro) Budućnost VOLI	Podgorica	Morača Sports Center	5,500
(Croatia) Cedevita	Zagreb	Dom sportova	3,100
(Croatia) Cibona	Zagreb	Dražen Petrović Hall	5,400
(Serbia) Crvena zvezda mts	Belgrade	Aleksandar Nikolić Hall	5,878
(Serbia) FMP	Belgrade	Železnik Hall	3,000
(Bosnia and Herzegovina) Igokea	Aleksandrovac	Laktaši Sports Hall	3,050
(Slovenia) Krka	Novo Mesto	Leon Štukelj Hall	2,500
(Serbia) Mega Bemax	Sremska Mitrovica	Pinki Sports Hall	2,500
(Montenegro) Mornar	Bar	Topolica Sport Hall	2,625
(Serbia) Partizan NIS	Belgrade	Aleksandar Nikolić Hall	5,878
(Slovenia) Petrol Olimpija	Ljubljana	Arena Stožice	12,480
(Croatia) Zadar	Zadar	Krešimir Ćosić Hall	7,997

=== Personnel and sponsorship ===
Team	Head coach	Captain	Kit manufacturer	Shirt sponsor
Budućnost VOLI	(Croatia) Jasmin Repeša	(Montenegro) Suad Šehović	Spalding	VOLI / Tea Medica
Cedevita	(Croatia) Slaven Rimac	(Bosnia and Herzegovina) Andrija Stipanović	Adidas	Cedevita / INA
Cibona	(Bosnia and Herzegovina) Ivan Velić	(Croatia) Marin Rozić	Visual	Erste Bank
Crvena zvezda mts	(Serbia) Milan Tomić	(Serbia) Branko Lazić	Nike	mts
FMP	(Serbia) Vladimir Jovanović	(Serbia) Radoš Šešlija	Champion	FMP
Igokea	(Serbia) Dragan Nikolić	(Serbia) Vuk Radivojević	GBT	m:tel
Krka	(Slovenia) Simon Petrov	(Slovenia) Domen Bratož	Žolna šport	Krka
Mega Bemax	(Serbia) Dejan Milojević	(Montenegro) Ognjen Čarapić	Adidas	Bemax / Tehnomanija
Mornar	(Montenegro) Mihailo Pavićević	(Montenegro) Marko Mijović	Armani	epcg
Partizan NIS	(Italy) Andrea Trinchieri	(Serbia) Novica Veličković	Under Armour	NIS / mts
Petrol Olimpija	(Slovenia) Jure Zdovc	(Slovenia) Gregor Hrovat	Peak	Petrol
Zadar	(Croatia) Ante Nazor	(Croatia) Šime Špralja	Visual	OTP Bank / Crodux

=== Coaching changes ===
Team	Outgoing manager	Date of vacancy	Position in table	Replaced with	Date of appointment	Ref.
Igokea	(Bosnia and Herzegovina) Dragan Bajić	2 April 2018	Off-season	(Bosnia and Herzegovina) Žarko Milaković	2 April 2018	
Crvena zvezda mts	(Serbia) Dušan Alimpijević	8 May 2018	Off-season	(Serbia) Milenko Topić	8 May 2018	
Cedevita	(Slovenia) Jure Zdovc	6 June 2018	Off-season	(Spain) Sito Alonso	8 June 2018	
Cibona	(Croatia) Ante Nazor	6 June 2018	Off-season	(Bosnia and Herzegovina) Ivan Velić	8 June 2018	
Zadar	(Croatia) Aramis Naglić	21 June 2018	Off-season	(Slovenia) Aleš Pipan	28 June 2018	
Crvena zvezda mts	(Serbia) Milenko Topić	July 2018	Off-season	(Serbia) Milan Tomić	13 July 2018	
Igokea	(Bosnia and Herzegovina) Žarko Milaković	July 2018	Off-season	(Serbia) Nenad Trajković	14 July 2018	
Zadar	(Slovenia) Aleš Pipan	23 October 2018	12th (0–4)	(Croatia) Ante Nazor	23 October 2018	
Cedevita	(Spain) Sito Alonso	25 October 2018	9th (1–3)	(Croatia) Slaven Rimac	25 October 2018	
Partizan NIS	(Serbia) Nenad Čanak	26 October 2018	7th (2–3)	(Italy) Andrea Trinchieri	1 November 2018	
Igokea	(Serbia) Nenad Trajković	5 November 2018	9th (2–4)	(Bosnia and Herzegovina) Žarko Milaković	5 November 2018	
Petrol Olimpija	(Slovenia) Zoran Martič	19 November 2018	11th (2–6)	(Serbia) Saša Nikitović	19 November 2018	
Igokea	(Bosnia and Herzegovina) Žarko Milaković	24 December 2018	10th (4–8)	(Serbia) Dragan Nikolić	24 December 2018	
Budućnost VOLI	(Serbia) Aleksandar Džikić	29 December 2018	3rd (8–4)	(Croatia) Jasmin Repeša	30 December 2018	
Petrol Olimpija	(Serbia) Saša Nikitović	19 February 2019	10th (6–13)	(Slovenia) Jure Zdovc	19 February 2019	

== Regular season ==
The season began on September 28, 2018. The regular season ended on March 17, 2019.

=== League table ===
Pos	Team	Pld	W	L	PF	PA	PD	Pts	Qualification or relegation
1	(Serbia) Crvena zvezda mts	22	21	1	1875	1517	+358	43	Advance to the playoffs
2	(Croatia) Cedevita	22	16	6	1924	1769	+155	38 (Note: Cedevita 1–1, 1.02; Budućnost VOLI 1–1, 0.98)	Advance to the playoffs
3	(Montenegro) Budućnost VOLI	22	16	6	1783	1636	+147	38	Advance to the playoffs
4	(Serbia) Partizan NIS	22	14	8	1779	1663	+116	36	Advance to the playoffs
5	(Serbia) Mega Bemax	22	10	12	1802	1880	−78	32 (Note: Mega Bemax 1–1, 1.06; FMP 1–1, 0.94)	
6	(Serbia) FMP	22	10	12	1736	1786	−50	32	
7	(Croatia) Cibona	22	9	13	1744	1810	−66	31	
8	(Bosnia and Herzegovina) Igokea	22	8	14	1798	1869	−71	30 (Note: Igokea 2–0, 1.17; Mornar 0–2, 0.85)	
9	(Montenegro) Mornar	22	8	14	1780	1907	−127	30	
10	(Slovenia) Krka	22	7	15	1587	1776	−189	29 (Note: Krka 1–1, 1.05; Zadar 1–1, 0.95)	
11	(Croatia) Zadar	22	7	15	1803	1900	−97	29	Qualification to the relegation playoffs
12	(Slovenia) Petrol Olimpija	22	6	16	1685	1783	−98	28	Relegation to the Second Division

Source: ABA League

=== Positions by round ===
First place & advance to the playoffs
Advance to the playoffs
Qualification to the relegation playoffs
Relegated

Team ╲ Round	1	2	3	4	5	6	7	8	9	10	11	12	13	14	15	16	17	18	19	20	21	22
(Serbia) Crvena zvezda mts	4	2	1	1	1	1	1	1	1	1	1	1	1	1	1	1	1	1	1	1	1	1
(Croatia) Cedevita	8	6	7	9	5	8	6	4	4	4	3	2	2	2	2	2	2	3	2	3	2	2
(Montenegro) Budućnost VOLI	1	4	4	3	3	3	3	2	2	2	2	3	3	3	3	3	3	2	3	2	3	3
(Serbia) Partizan NIS	5	3	5	5	7	5	4	5	5	5	5	5	5	4	4	4	4	4	4	4	4	4
(Serbia) Mega Bemax	6	1	2	2	2	2	2	3	3	3	4	4	4	5	5	5	5	5	5	5	5	5
(Serbia) FMP	3	8	6	8	10	6	5	6	6	6	7	6	6	6	6	8	7	6	6	6	6	6
(Croatia) Cibona	9	10	11	10	8	4	7	9	10	8	6	7	9	7	8	6	8	8	9	7	7	7
(Bosnia and Herzegovina) Igokea	7	7	8	11	6	9	11	8	7	7	10	10	7	10	11	9	9	10	11	9	10	8
(Montenegro) Mornar	11	12	9	6	9	10	9	12	12	11	11	11	8	9	7	7	6	7	8	10	8	9
(Slovenia) Krka	12	9	10	7	11	12	12	10	11	12	12	12	12	12	12	12	12	12	12	12	12	10
(Croatia) Zadar	10	11	12	12	12	11	10	7	8	10	9	9	11	8	10	11	11	9	7	8	9	11
(Slovenia) Petrol Olimpija	2	5	3	4	4	7	8	11	9	9	8	8	10	11	9	10	10	11	10	11	11	12

Source: ABA League

=== Results ===
Home \ Away	BUD	CED	CIB	CZV	FMP	IGO	KRK	MEG	MOR	PAR	OLI	ZAD
Budućnost VOLI	—	80–78	91–82	71–87	79–59	96–70	86–64	91–85	102–71	75–71	85–69	75–69
Cedevita	63–58	—	89–68	84–68	87–85	100–80	104–75	86–95	94–80	84–87	95–82	83–72
Cibona	83–77	78–75	—	54–76	90–71	84–86	99–71	89–71	84–73	59–83	87–70	66–97
Crvena zvezda mts	86–72	94–79	78–68	—	79–62	96–75	80–66	100–76	104–71	70–68	89–61	97–70
FMP	70–87	81–95	93–88	72–81	—	87–78	93–65	106–89	82–84	73–72	64–63	99–86
Igokea	78–85	75–78	87–69	77–79	74–85	—	91–73	79–80	81–60	84–92	115–105	100–82
Krka	69–64	82–71	90–100	66–96	71–76	69–71	—	82–69	80–76	80–76	62–59	77–78
Mega Bemax	70–77	101–107	82–80	68–78	89–61	93–88	80–72	—	82–80	74–81	81–77	85–97
Mornar	95–99	102–103	91–78	57–90	79–69	97–103	86–77	80–84	—	97–94	80–75	89–81
Partizan NIS	76–67	71–76	85–67	71–77	83–77	67–57	87–55	98–86	75–73	—	82–79	85–95
Petrol Olimpija	72–77	70–98	78–80	60–83	88–86	92–69	70–69	91–78	87–66	66–72	—	91–81
Zadar	69–89	85–95	95–91	69–87	79–85	95–80	64–72	80–84	83–93	92–97	84–80	—

Updated to match(es) played on March 17, 2019. Source: ABA League
Legend: Blue = home team win; Red = away team win.
Matches with lighter background shading were decided after overtime.

== Playoffs ==
The semi-finals will be played in a best-of-three format, while the Finals were played in a best-of-five format. Playoffs will begin on 23 March 2019 and planned to end by 22 April 2019.

=== Bracket ===
Semifinals
March 23 – April 6
(Serbia) Crvena zvezda mts	2
(Serbia) Partizan NIS	1
March 25 – April 7
(Croatia) Cedevita	1
(Montenegro) Budućnost VOLI	2

Finals
April 12 – April 22
(Serbia) Crvena zvezda mts	3
(Montenegro) Budućnost VOLI	2

2018–19 ABA League Champions

Crvena zvezda mts
4th title

=== Semifinals ===
Team 1	Series	Team 2	Game 1	Game 2	Game 3
Crvena zvezda mts (Serbia)	2–1	(Serbia) Partizan NIS	106–101	67–70	84–63
Cedevita (Croatia)	1–2	(Montenegro) Budućnost VOLI	90–83	72–87	73–78

=== Finals ===
Team 1	Series	Team 2	Game 1	Game 2	Game 3	Game 4	Game 5
Crvena zvezda mts (Serbia)	3–2	(Montenegro) Budućnost VOLI	91–72	107–69	72–80	80–84	97–54

== Relegation playoffs ==
As of the 2018–19 season, the 11th placed team of the 2018–19 First Division season and the runners-up of the 2018–19 Second Division season will play in the Qualifiers for a spot in the 2019–20 First Division season.

As the team coming from the ABA League, Zadar had the home court advantage in the first and third game of the series, while MZT was the host of the second game of the Qualifiers series. Zadar won the series 2−1 and kept its First League status.

=== Teams ===
- First Division 11th place: (Croatia) Zadar
- Second Division 2nd place: (North Macedonia) MZT Skopje Aerodrom

=== Results ===
Team 1	Series	Team 2	Game 1	Game 2	Game 3
Zadar (Croatia)	2–1	(North Macedonia) MZT Skopje Aerodrom	83–89	78–77	86−75

== Statistical leaders ==
As of 22 April 2019

=== PIR ===
Pos	Player	Club	PIR
1	(Serbia) Dragan Apić	FMP	29.50
2	(Croatia) Luka Božić	Zadar	21.68
3	(Serbia) Sava Lešić	Igokea	18.05
4	(Croatia) Tomislav Zubčić	Igokea	17.57
5	(Croatia) Dominik Mavra	Krka	17.29

=== Points ===
Pos	Player	Club	PPG
1	(Serbia) Dragan Apić	FMP	21.29
2	(Croatia) Tomislav Zubčić	Igokea	19.00
3	(Georgia (country)) Jacob Pullen	Cedevita	17.40
4	(Croatia) Dominik Mavra	Krka	16.29
5	(Serbia) Sava Lešić	Igokea	15.18

=== Rebounds ===
Pos	Player	Club	RPG
1	(Croatia) Luka Božić	Zadar	7.23
2	(Serbia) Dragan Apić	FMP	7.14
3	(Serbia) Uroš Luković	Mornar	7.00
4	(Nigeria) Michael Ojo	Crvena zvezda	6.43
5	(Serbia) Sava Lešić	Igokea	6.41

=== Assists ===
Pos	Player	Club	APG
1	(Slovenia) Matic Rebec	FMP	5.84
2	(United States) Joe Ragland	Crvena zvezda	5.73
3	(Croatia) Dominik Mavra	Krka	5.71
4	(Bosnia and Herzegovina) Alex Renfroe	Partizan	5.54
5	(United States) Scottie Reynolds	Olimpija	5.50

Source: ABA League

== Awards ==
Pos.	Player	Team	Ref.
MVP
C	(Georgia (country)) Goga Bitadze	(Montenegro) Budućnost VOLI	
Finals MVP
SG	(United States) Billy Baron	(Serbia) Crvena zvezda mts	
Top Prospect
C	(Georgia (country)) Goga Bitadze	(Montenegro) Budućnost VOLI	
Ideal Starting Five
PG	(United States) Joe Ragland	(Serbia) Crvena zvezda mts	
SG	(Georgia (country)) Jacob Pullen	(Croatia) Cedevita	
SF	(Greece) Stratos Perperoglou	(Serbia) Crvena zvezda mts	
PF	(Australia) Jock Landale	(Serbia) Partizan NIS	
C	(Georgia (country)) Goga Bitadze	(Montenegro) Budućnost VOLI	

== MVP List ==
=== MVP of the Round ===
Round	Player	Team	PIR
1	(Serbia) Dragan Apić	(Serbia) FMP	40
2	(Serbia) Sava Lešić	(Bosnia and Herzegovina) Igokea	30
3	(Montenegro) Nemanja Vranješ	(Montenegro) Mornar	33
4	(Serbia) Uroš Luković	(Montenegro) Mornar	31
5	(Croatia) Luka Božić	(Croatia) Zadar	36
6	(Croatia) Luka Božić (2)	(Croatia) Zadar	33
7	(Serbia) Stefan Pot	(Serbia) FMP	39
8	(Croatia) Luka Božić (3)	(Croatia) Zadar	36
9	(United States) Jacob Pullen	(Croatia) Cedevita	43
10	(Serbia) Vanja Marinković	(Serbia) Partizan	32
11	(Serbia) Marko Ljubičić	(Croatia) Cibona	30
12	(Serbia) Dragan Apić (2)	(Serbia) FMP	34
13	(Serbia) Dragan Apić (3)	(Serbia) FMP	42
14	(Croatia) Luka Božić (4)	(Croatia) Zadar	25
15	(United States) Elgin Cook	(Croatia) Cedevita	32
16	(Croatia) Filip Bundović	(Croatia) Cibona	29
17	(Montenegro) Nemanja Vranješ (2)	(Montenegro) Mornar	29
18	(Serbia) Stefan Pot (2)	(Serbia) FMP	35
19	(Austria) Luka Ašćerić	(Serbia) Mega Bemax	35
20	(Croatia) Dominik Mavra	(Slovenia) Krka	37
21	(Georgia (country)) Goga Bitadze	(Montenegro) Budućnost VOLI	31
22	(Serbia) Danilo Anđušić	(Bosnia and Herzegovina) Igokea	30
SF1	(Serbia) Dejan Davidovac	(Serbia) Crvena zvezda mts	26
SF2	(Serbia) Vanja Marinković (2)	(Serbia) Partizan	22
SF3	(Bosnia and Herzegovina) Nemanja Gordić	(Montenegro) Budućnost VOLI	16
F1	(United States) Billy Baron	(Serbia) Crvena zvezda mts	27
F2	(United States) K. C. Rivers	(Serbia) Crvena zvezda mts	20
F3	(United States) Norris Cole	(Montenegro) Budućnost VOLI	20
F4	(United States) Norris Cole (2)	(Montenegro) Budućnost VOLI	36
F5	(United States) K. C. Rivers (2)	(Serbia) Crvena zvezda mts	21

Source: ABA League

=== MVP of the Month ===
Month	Player	Team	Ref.
2018
October	(Georgia (country)) Goga Bitadze	(Serbia) Mega Bemax	
November	(Serbia) Dragan Apić	(Serbia) FMP	
December	(Serbia) Dragan Apić (2)	(Serbia) FMP	
2019
January	(United States) Marcus Paige	(Serbia) Partizan	
February	(Serbia) Stefan Pot	(Serbia) FMP	

== Attendances ==
Attendances include playoff games:

Pos	Team	Total	High	Low	Average	Change
1	(Serbia) Partizan NIS	66,420	7,920	1,200	5,535	+20.6%
2	(Serbia) Crvena zvezda mts	73,031	6,858	2,345	4,564	+3.4%
3	(Croatia) Zadar	48,750	8,000	1,000	4,432	+2.1%
4	(Montenegro) Budućnost VOLI	55,009	5,860	1,950	3,929	+15.5%
5	(Montenegro) Mornar	25,400	3,000	1,550	2,309	+8.6%
6	(Croatia) Cedevita	25,850	5,500	500	1,988	+44.1%
7	(Bosnia and Herzegovina) Igokea	19,350	3,500	500	1,759	−19.6%
8	(Slovenia) Petrol Olimpija	16,670	3,500	700	1,515	+6.2%
9	(Serbia) Mega Bemax	16,080	2,500	1,000	1,462	+1.5%
10	(Croatia) Cibona	14,740	2,350	590	1,340	−5.2%
11	(Slovenia) Krka	13,730	2,000	500	1,248	+51.3%^{1}
12	(Serbia) FMP	9,790	1,400	500	890	−2.6%
	League total	384,820	8,000	500	2,691	+5.7%

Updated to match(es) played on April 22, 2019. Source:
Notes:
1: previous season average applied to second division games

== Clubs in European competitions ==
Competition	Team	Progress		Result
EuroLeague	(Montenegro) Budućnost VOLI	Regular season		15th (6–24)
EuroCup	(Serbia) Partizan NIS	Top 16 Group E	▲(1)	4th (2–4)
EuroCup	(Serbia) Crvena zvezda mts	Top 16 Group G	▲(1)	3rd (2–4)
EuroCup	(Croatia) Cedevita	Top 16 Group H	▲(1)	4th (0–6)
EuroCup	(Montenegro) Mornar	Regular season Group D		5th (2–8)
Champions League	(Slovenia) Petrol Olimpija	Regular season Group D		8th (1–13)

== See also ==
- List of current ABA League First Division team rosters
- 2018–19 ABA League Second Division
- 2018 ABA League Supercup
- 2018–19 Junior ABA League
- 2018–19 WABA League

2018–19 domestic competitions

- 2018–19 Basketball League of Serbia
- (Croatia) 2018–19 Premijer liga
- (Slovenia) 2018–19 Slovenian Basketball League
- (Montenegro) 2018–19 Prva A liga
- 2018–19 Basketball Championship of Bosnia and Herzegovina

Teams

- 2018–19 KK Crvena zvezda season
- 2018–19 KK Partizan season
