= List of current ABA League First Division team rosters =

Below is a list of current rosters of teams from ABA League First Division.

There are a total of 14 teams in the First Division.

== Borac Čačak ==
Note: Flags indicate national team eligibility at FIBA-sanctioned events. Players may hold other non-FIBA nationalities not displayed.

Borac Čačak roster
Players
Coaches

Pos.	No.	Nat.	Name	Ht.		Age
PG	4	(Serbia)	Radović, Petar (TW)	1.80 m (5 ft 11 in)		17 – 5 November 2007
F	9	(Serbia)	Nikolić, Pavle	2.01 m (6 ft 7 in)		20 – 4 September 2005
G	0	(United States)	Davidson, Keishawn	1.88 m (6 ft 2 in)	79 kg (174 lb)	24 – 1 March 2001
SG	44	(Serbia)	Čarapić, Uroš (C)	1.95 m (6 ft 5 in)		29 – 24 September 1996
SG	11	(Serbia)	Ćurčić, Đorđe	1.95 m (6 ft 5 in)		20 – 17 April 2005
C	5	(Serbia)	Pavićević, Marko	2.09 m (6 ft 10 in)		24 – 8 May 2001
C	41	(Serbia)	Gagić, Đorđe	2.10 m (6 ft 11 in)	130 kg (287 lb)	34 – 28 December 1990
PG	3	(United States)	Baldwin, Diante	1.83 m (6 ft 0 in)	82 kg (181 lb)	30 – 17 October 1994
G	66	(Lithuania)	Valinskas, Paulius	1.91 m (6 ft 3 in)	85 kg (187 lb)	29 – 9 December 1995
PG		(Serbia)	Uskoković, Aleksa	1.90 m (6 ft 3 in)	86 kg (190 lb)	26 – 30 August 1999

Head coach

- (Serbia) Saša Ocokoljić

Assistant coach(es)

- (Serbia) Miloš Pejanović
- (Serbia) Miroslav Milić

Team manager

- (Serbia) Marko Ivanović

Legend

- (C) Team captain
- (TW) Two-way affiliate player
- Injured

- Roster
Updated: January 10, 2023

== Budućnost VOLI ==
Note: Flags indicate national team eligibility at FIBA-sanctioned events. Players may hold other non-FIBA nationalities not displayed.

KK Budućnost Podgorica roster
Players
Coaches

Pos.	No.	Nat.	Name	Ht.	Wt.	Age
G	1	(United States) (Nigeria)	Sulaimon, Rasheed	1.93 m (6 ft 4 in)	88 kg (194 lb)	31 – 9 March 1994
SG	3	(United States)	Magee, Fletcher	1.93 m (6 ft 4 in)	91 kg (201 lb)	28 – 13 November 1996
PG	4	(United States)	Mays, Skylar	1.91 m (6 ft 3 in)	93 kg (205 lb)	28 – 5 September 1997
C	6	(United States)	Thompson, James	2.08 m (6 ft 10 in)	109 kg (240 lb)	30 – 18 January 1995
SF	7	(Montenegro)	Slavković, Andrija	2.02 m (6 ft 8 in)	100 kg (220 lb)	26 – 15 February 1999
PF	10	(Serbia)	Tanasković, Nikola	2.04 m (6 ft 8 in)	102 kg (225 lb)	27 – 21 October 1997
PG	11	(United States)	Ferrell, Yogi	1.83 m (6 ft 0 in)	81 kg (179 lb)	32 – 9 May 1993
SF	13	(Montenegro)	Jovanović, Đorđije	1.99 m (6 ft 6 in)	88 kg (194 lb)	22 – 15 May 2003
PF	15	(United States) (Germany)	Morgan, Juwan	2.01 m (6 ft 7 in)	105 kg (231 lb)	28 – 17 April 1997
C	16	(France)	Boutsiele, Jerry	2.07 m (6 ft 9 in)	94 kg (207 lb)	33 – 20 April 1992
G	50	(Ukraine)	Kovliar, Oleksandr	1.90 m (6 ft 3 in)	76 kg (168 lb)	23 – 24 June 2002
SF	83	(France)	Bouteille, Axel	2.01 m (6 ft 7 in)	82 kg (181 lb)	30 – 14 May 1995

Head coach

- (Slovenia) Andrej Žakelj

Assistant coach(es)

- (Montenegro) Vladimir Todorović
- (Montenegro) Luka Sjekloća

Strength & conditioning coach(es)

- (Montenegro) Nikola Musić

Team manager

- (Montenegro) Gavrilo Pajović

Legend

- (C) Team captain
- Injured

- Roster
Updated: July 14, 2025

== Cedevita Olimpija ==
Note: Flags indicate national team eligibility at FIBA-sanctioned events. Players may hold other non-FIBA nationalities not displayed.

Cedevita Olimpija roster
Players
Coaches

Pos.	No.	Nat.	Name	Ht.	Age
G/F	0	(United States)	D.J. Stewart Jr.	1.96 m (6 ft 5 in)	26 – 28 July 1999
PG	1	(United States)	Gibson, Umoja	1.82 m (6 ft 0 in)	27 – 4 July 1998
SG	2	(United States)	Girard III, Joseph	1.85 m (6 ft 1 in)	24 – 27 November 2000
F	3	(Slovenia)	Radović, Rok	2.00 m (6 ft 7 in)	24 – 4 February 2001
PG	5	(Slovenia)	Nikolić, Aleksej	1.91 m (6 ft 3 in)	30 – 21 February 1995
C	7	(Austria)	Brajkovic, Luka	2.10 m (6 ft 11 in)	26 – 26 June 1999
PF/C	8	(France)	Houindo, Cameron	2.04 m (6 ft 8 in)	17 – 10 January 2008
SG	11	(Slovenia)	Blažič, Jaka (C)	1.96 m (6 ft 5 in)	35 – 30 June 1990
SG	17	(Slovenia)	Ciperle, Maks	2.00 m (6 ft 7 in)	17 – 24 September 2008
F	20	(Slovenia)	Cerkvenik, Miha	2.01 m (6 ft 7 in)	23 – 9 November 2001
PF/C	24	(Croatia)	Škara, David	2.01 m (6 ft 7 in)	30 – 26 February 1995
PF	33	(Greece)	Chougkaz, Nikos	2.04 m (6 ft 8 in)	24 – 4 October 2000
PF/C	41	(Slovenia)	Daneu, Žiga	2.11 m (6 ft 11 in)	23 – 10 August 2002
PF/C	54	(Canada)	Kennedy, Thomas	2.06 m (6 ft 9 in)	25 – 1 September 2000

Head coach

- (Montenegro) Zvezdan Mitrović

Assistant coach(es)

- (Serbia) Đorđe Adžić
- (Slovenia) Dalibor Damjanović
- (Slovenia) Grega Nachbar

Strength & conditioning coach(es)

- (Croatia) Filip Ujaković

Physiotherapist(s)

- (Slovenia) Borut Černilogar
- (Slovenia) Jakob Jesih

Team manager

- (Slovenia) Matic Zupanc

Legend

- (C) Team captain
- Injured

- Roster
Updated: 23 September 2025

== Cibona ==
Note: Flags indicate national team eligibility at FIBA-sanctioned events. Players may hold other non-FIBA nationalities not displayed.

KK Cibona roster
Players
Coaches

Pos.	No.	Nat.	Name	Ht.	Age
C	1	(Bosnia and Herzegovina)	Lončar, Markus	2.13 m (7 ft 0 in)	29 – 8 April 1996
G	3	(Croatia)	Radovčić, Krešimir	1.95 m (6 ft 5 in)	28 – 19 April 1997
G	5	(Croatia)	Burek, Borna	1.85 m (6 ft 1 in)	18 – 4 July 2007
PF	6	(Croatia)	Rudan, Matej	2.08 m (6 ft 10 in)	24 – 21 March 2001
F	7	(Croatia)	Skorić, Luka	2.05 m (6 ft 9 in)	22 – 1 February 2003
G	8	(Croatia)	Bart, Vigo	1.92 m (6 ft 4 in)	20 – 26 April 2005
F	17	(Croatia)	Serdarušić, Renato	2.02 m (6 ft 8 in)	24 – 30 January 2001
C	23	(Croatia)	Pavković, Josip	2.06 m (6 ft 9 in)	19 – 13 May 2006
F	24	(Croatia)	Katanović, Borna	1.97 m (6 ft 6 in)	18 – 13 June 2007
PG	31	(Slovenia)	Šiško, Žan Mark	1.91 m (6 ft 3 in)	28 – 29 June 1997
G	32	(United States)	Roberson, Justin	1.87 m (6 ft 2 in)	32 – 8 July 1993
F/C	44	(United States)	Hepa, Kamaka	2.08 m (6 ft 10 in)	25 – 27 January 2000

Head coach

- (Croatia) Ivan Rudež

Assistant coach(es)

- (Croatia) Ivan Stanišak

Legend

- (C) Team captain
- Injured

- Roster
Updated: September 23, 2025

== Crvena zvezda mts ==
Note: Flags indicate national team eligibility at FIBA-sanctioned events. Players may hold other non-FIBA nationalities not displayed.

Crvena zvezda Meridianbet roster
Players
Coaches

Pos.	No.	Nat.	Name	Ht.	Wt.	Age
PG	0	(Bulgaria)	Miller-McIntyre, Codi	1.91 m (6 ft 3 in)	90 kg (198 lb)	31 – 1 June 1994
C	1	(Serbia)	Plavšić, Uroš	2.16 m (7 ft 1 in)	120 kg (265 lb)	26 – 22 December 1998
G	2	(Serbia)	Miljenović, Stefan	1.93 m (6 ft 4 in)	88 kg (194 lb)	24 – 21 August 2001
SG	3	(United States)	Canaan, Isaiah (injured)	1.83 m (6 ft 0 in)	91 kg (201 lb)	34 – 21 May 1991
G	4	(United States)	Graham, Devonte'	1.85 m (6 ft 1 in)	88 kg (194 lb)	30 – 22 February 1995
F	7	(Serbia)	Davidovac, Dejan	2.03 m (6 ft 8 in)	95 kg (209 lb)	30 – 17 January 1995
G	11	(United States)	Carter, Tyson	1.93 m (6 ft 4 in)	79 kg (174 lb)	27 – 14 January 1998
F	12	(Serbia)	Kalinić, Nikola	2.03 m (6 ft 8 in)	105 kg (231 lb)	33 – 8 November 1991
G/F	13	(Serbia)	Dobrić, Ognjen (C)	2.00 m (6 ft 7 in)	93 kg (205 lb)	30 – 27 October 1994
C	14	(Cuba)	Rivero, Jasiel	2.06 m (6 ft 9 in)	110 kg (243 lb)	31 – 31 October 1993
C	15	(Nigeria)	Izundu, Ebuka	2.08 m (6 ft 10 in)	105 kg (231 lb)	29 – 28 June 1996
F/C	17	(Serbia)	Stojković, Lazar	2.12 m (6 ft 11 in)		17 – 22 October 2007
C	21	(Russia)	Bolomboy, Joel (injured)	2.06 m (6 ft 9 in)	106 kg (234 lb)	31 – 28 January 1994
SF	33	(Nigeria)	Nwora, Jordan	2.03 m (6 ft 8 in)	102 kg (225 lb)	27 – 9 September 1998
F	37	(Nigeria)	Ojeleye, Semi	1.98 m (6 ft 6 in)	109 kg (240 lb)	30 – 5 December 1994
SG	44	(Serbia)	Radošić, Ognjen	1.97 m (6 ft 6 in)	75 kg (165 lb)	19 – 26 May 2006
PF	95	(Nigeria)	Moneke, Chima	1.99 m (6 ft 6 in)	101 kg (223 lb)	29 – 24 December 1995

Head coach

- (Greece) Ioannis Sfairopoulos

Assistant coach(es)

- (Greece) Vasileios Geragotellis
- (Serbia) Tomislav Tomović
- (Serbia) Đorđe Lazarević
- (Serbia) Mladen Manojlović
- (Serbia) Miloš Vuletić

Strength & conditioning coach(es)

- (Serbia) Vladan Radonjić
- (Serbia) Igor Tomašević

Team manager

- (Serbia) Nebojša Ilić

Legend

- (C) Team captain
- Injured

- Roster
Updated: August 26, 2025

== FMP ==
Note: Flags indicate national team eligibility at FIBA-sanctioned events. Players may hold other non-FIBA nationalities not displayed.

FMP Meridian roster
Players
Coaches

Pos.	No.	Nat.	Name	Ht.	Age
PG	0	(Slovenia)	Rebec, Matic	1.81 m (5 ft 11 in)	30 – 24 January 1995
SG	3	(Montenegro)	Popović, Petar	1.95 m (6 ft 5 in)	29 – 13 September 1996
G/F	10	(Serbia)	Šaranović, Nikola	2.00 m (6 ft 7 in)	22 – 20 August 2003
SF	11	(Serbia)	Simović, Ranko	2.03 m (6 ft 8 in)	26 – 7 June 1999
G/F	12	(Serbia)	Matović, Ognjen	1.98 m (6 ft 6 in)	21 – 8 August 2004
F	13	(Montenegro)	Tomašević, Bojan	2.01 m (6 ft 7 in)	24 – 20 June 2001
C	14	(Serbia)	Gašić, Nikola	2.12 m (6 ft 11 in)	23 – 17 November 2001
F	15	(Serbia)	Radosavljević, Dušan	2.03 m (6 ft 8 in)	23 – 3 November 2001
PF	22	(Serbia)	Stanojević, Aleksa	2.04 m (6 ft 8 in)	19 – 2 September 2006
SG	23	(Serbia)	Stojanović, Vojislav	1.96 m (6 ft 5 in)	28 – 14 April 1997
C	32	(Serbia)	Kuzmić, Ognjen	2.13 m (7 ft 0 in)	35 – 16 May 1990
F	73	(Serbia)	Lazarević, Stefan	1.81 m (5 ft 11 in)	29 – 20 August 1996
F	88	(Serbia)	Barna, Filip	2.01 m (6 ft 7 in)	25 – 5 December 1999

Head coach

- (Serbia) Saša Nikitović

Assistant coach(es)

- (Serbia) Goran Tadić
- (Serbia) Goran Topić

Strength & conditioning coach(es)

- (Serbia) Feđa Sretenović

Legend

- (C) Team captain
- (L) On loan
- Injured

- Roster
Updated: 18 November 2024

== Igokea ==
Note: Flags indicate national team eligibility at FIBA-sanctioned events. Players may hold other non-FIBA nationalities not displayed.

Igokea roster
Players
Coaches

Pos.	No.	Nat.	Name	Ht.	Wt.	Age
PF	4	(Serbia)	Gavrilović, Strahinja	2.06 m (6 ft 9 in)		32 – 5 April 1993
G	8	(Serbia)	Pušica, Vasilije	1.96 m (6 ft 5 in)		30 – 12 September 1995
SF	10	(Bosnia and Herzegovina)	Ilić, Vojin	2.02 m (6 ft 8 in)		25 – 9 August 2000
SG	11	(Serbia)	Stanković, Ognjen	1.98 m (6 ft 6 in)		20 – 19 March 2005
F/C	12	(Bosnia and Herzegovina) (Croatia)	Antunović, Sandro	2.04 m (6 ft 8 in)		27 – 7 May 1998
G/F	21	(Serbia)	Milosavljević, Dragan (C)	1.98 m (6 ft 6 in)		36 – 11 May 1989
PF	22	(Serbia)	Simanić, Boriša	2.11 m (6 ft 11 in)		27 – 20 March 1998
C	32	(United States)	Carter, Terrell	2.08 m (6 ft 10 in)		29 – 6 January 1996
SG	34	(Serbia)	Jeremić, Marko	1.92 m (6 ft 4 in)		33 – 23 November 1991
F	77	(Serbia) (Bosnia and Herzegovina)	Milovanović, Velibor	2.00 m (6 ft 7 in)		21 – 7 January 2004
C		(United States)	Ceaser, Nighael	2.03 m (6 ft 8 in)		25 – 3 February 2000
G/F		(United States)	Bess, Javon	1.98 m (6 ft 6 in)		29 – 1 April 1996
PG		(United States)	Tyree, Breein	1.88 m (6 ft 2 in)		27 – 13 January 1998
G		(United States)	Lewis, JeQuan	1.85 m (6 ft 1 in)		31 – 7 September 1994
C		(Serbia)	Popović, Nikola	2.11 m (6 ft 11 in)		28 – 19 July 1997

Head coach

- (Serbia) Nenad Stefanović

Assistant coach(es)

- (Serbia) Marko Cvetković
- (Bosnia and Herzegovina) Zoran Petković
- (Bosnia and Herzegovina) Milutin Latinčić
- (Serbia) Vasilj Đurić

Team manager

- (Bosnia and Herzegovina) (Serbia) Siniša Kovačević

Legend

- (C) Team captain
- Injured

- Roster
- Transactions
Updated: July 15, 2025

== Mega Basket ==
Note: Flags indicate national team eligibility at FIBA-sanctioned events. Players may hold other non-FIBA nationalities not displayed.

Mega Superbet roster
Players
Coaches

Pos.	No.	Nat.	Name	Ht.	Age
F	0	(Serbia)	Milenković, Aleksa	2.04 m (6 ft 8 in)	21 – 18 April 2004
PG	2	(Serbia)	Drezgić, Savo	1.94 m (6 ft 4 in)	19 – 11 August 2006
G/F	3	(Serbia)	Đulović, Asim	1.98 m (6 ft 6 in)	20 – 30 July 2005
C	4	(Mali) (Serbia)	Siby, Abdramane	2.13 m (7 ft 0 in)	18 – 2 October 2006
PF	7	(Serbia)	Vukčević, Marko	2.04 m (6 ft 8 in)	22 – 6 May 2003
F	6	(Serbia)	Marković, Bogoljub	2.10 m (6 ft 11 in)	20 – 12 July 2005
SG	8	(Slovenia)	Kroflič, Urban	1.98 m (6 ft 6 in)	19 – 28 March 2006
SG	13	(Serbia)	Danilović, Vuk (Y)	1.93 m (6 ft 4 in)	17 – 2 January 2008
F/C	17	(Serbia)	Nikolić, Ognjen	2.10 m (6 ft 11 in)	18 – 11 July 2007
C	35	(Serbia)	Gacić, Lazar	2.14 m (7 ft 0 in)	20 – 31 January 2005
G	77	(Serbia)	Mušicki, Andrej	1.89 m (6 ft 2 in)	20 – 14 February 2005
PG		(Serbia)	Radojičić, Vuk	1.83 m (6 ft 0 in)	24 – 29 June 2001
C		(Italy)	Suigo, Luigi	2.20 m (7 ft 3 in)	18 – 29 January 2007
C		(Serbia)	Bačko, Pavle (TW)	2.13 m (7 ft 0 in)	18 – 11 July 2007
SG		(Serbia)	Srzentić, Ognjen	2.02 m (6 ft 8 in)	19 – 24 May 2006

Head coach

- (Serbia) Vule Avdalović

Assistant coach(es)

- (Serbia) Branislav Božović
- (Serbia) Milan Mitrović

Team manager

- (Serbia) Aleksandar Rašić

Legend

- (C) Team captain
- (Y) Youth player
- (L) On loan
- (TW) Two-way affiliate player
- Injured

- Roster
- Transactions
Updated: August 5, 2025

== Mornar ==
Note: Flags indicate national team eligibility at FIBA-sanctioned events. Players may hold other non-FIBA nationalities not displayed.

Mornar Barsko zlato roster
Players
Coaches

Pos.	No.	Nat.	Name	Ht.		Age
SG	44	(Montenegro)	Peković, Novak	1.96 m (6 ft 5 in)	80 kg (176 lb)	22 – 4 June 2003
SG	13	(Serbia)	Kovačević, Marko	1.96 m (6 ft 5 in)	90 kg (198 lb)	26 – 29 July 1999
F	22	(Montenegro)	Vesković, Marko	1.92 m (6 ft 4 in)	90 kg (198 lb)	23 – 9 January 2002
PF	23	(Montenegro)	Miković, Milija	2.05 m (6 ft 9 in)	107 kg (236 lb)	31 – 25 March 1994
SG	41	(Montenegro)	Vranješ, Nemanja (C)	1.87 m (6 ft 2 in)	88 kg (194 lb)	37 – 11 May 1988
PG	47	(Montenegro)	Kovačević, Luka	1.83 m (6 ft 0 in)	75 kg (165 lb)	18 – 8 May 2007
PF	88	(Montenegro)	Radetić, Lazar	2.04 m (6 ft 8 in)	95 kg (209 lb)	22 – 3 July 2003
PG	55	(United States)	Murray Jr., Dwight	1.83 m (6 ft 0 in)	82 kg (181 lb)	25 – 31 January 2000
SF	50	(United States)	Weathers, Marcus	1.96 m (6 ft 5 in)	98 kg (216 lb)	28 – 5 August 1997
G	24	(United States)	Waller, Tay	1.88 m (6 ft 2 in)	88 kg (194 lb)	37 – 11 July 1988
PF	31	(France)	Gavrilović, Alex	2.06 m (6 ft 9 in)	111 kg (245 lb)	33 – 25 November 1991
PF	21	(Serbia)	Bursać, Aleksandar	2.05 m (6 ft 9 in)	100 kg (220 lb)	30 – 19 March 1995
G	33	(Serbia)	Jovanović, Strahinja	1.88 m (6 ft 2 in)	79 kg (174 lb)	29 – 29 August 1996
SG	12	(United States)	Lewis, Trey	1.96 m (6 ft 5 in)	88 kg (194 lb)	33 – 16 February 1992
C	15	(Serbia)	Luković, Uroš	2.13 m (7 ft 0 in)	100 kg (220 lb)	36 – 6 June 1989

Head coach

- (Montenegro) Mihailo Pavićević

Assistant coach(es)

- (Montenegro) Ivan Jelenić
- (Montenegro) Vaso Milović

Legend

- (C) Team captain
- Injured

- Roster
Updated: October 1, 2022

== MZT Skopje Aerodrom ==
Note: Flags indicate national team eligibility at FIBA-sanctioned events. Players may hold other non-FIBA nationalities not displayed.

MZT Skopje roster
Players
Coaches

Pos.	No.	Nat.	Name	Ht.	Wt.	Age
C	0	(North Macedonia)	Krstevski, Bojan	2.08 m (6 ft 10 in)	100 kg (220 lb)	36 – 4 June 1989
PG	1	(North Macedonia)	Petkov, Marin	1.92 m (6 ft 4 in)	78 kg (172 lb)	22 – 20 February 2003
F	3	(United States)	Davis, Juan	2.03 m (6 ft 8 in)	93 kg (205 lb)	29 – 15 August 1996
PF	6	(North Macedonia)	Andonoski, Andrej	2.00 m (6 ft 7 in)	91 kg (201 lb)	23 – 2 April 2002
F	8	(North Macedonia)	Dvojakovski, Oliver	2.04 m (6 ft 8 in)		28 – 26 January 1997
PG	9	(North Macedonia)	Magdevski, Andrej	1.92 m (6 ft 4 in)	85 kg (187 lb)	29 – 14 January 1996
SG	11	(United States)	McCadden, Elijah	1.95 m (6 ft 5 in)	95 kg (209 lb)	25 – 20 December 1999
PF	13	(North Macedonia)	Maslinko, Andrej	2.08 m (6 ft 10 in)	100 kg (220 lb)	28 – 20 May 1997
G/F	19	(North Macedonia)	Stojanovski, Damjan (C)	1.98 m (6 ft 6 in)	88 kg (194 lb)	37 – 9 December 1987
SG	20	(North Macedonia)	Stojanovski, Vojdan	1.95 m (6 ft 5 in)	87 kg (192 lb)	37 – 9 December 1987
PF/C	26	(United States)	Gill, L.G.	2.03 m (6 ft 8 in)	110 kg (243 lb)	30 – 24 December 1994
SG	77	(North Macedonia)	Veličkovski, Bojan (TW)	1.96 m (6 ft 5 in)	82 kg (181 lb)	19 – 7 April 2006

Head coach

- (North Macedonia) Vasko Atanasov

Assistant coach(es)

- (North Macedonia) Dejan Srbinovski
- (North Macedonia) Tino Danevski

Strength & conditioning coach(es)

- (North Macedonia) Filip Bosilkov

Physiotherapist(s)

- (North Macedonia) Darko Savov

Team manager

- (North Macedonia) Filip Gjorevski

Legend

- (C) Team captain
- (TW) Two-way affiliate player
- Injured

- Roster
Updated: 22 August 2025

== Partizan NIS ==
Note: Flags indicate national team eligibility at FIBA-sanctioned events. Players may hold other non-FIBA nationalities not displayed.

Partizan Mozzart Bet roster
Players
Coaches

Pos.	No.	Nat.	Name	Ht.	Wt.	Age
PG	1	(United States) (South Sudan)	Jones, Carlik	1.83 m (6 ft 0 in)	82 kg (181 lb)	27 – 23 December 1997
G	2	(United States)	Milton, Shake	1.96 m (6 ft 5 in)	93 kg (205 lb)	29 – 26 September 1996
F	3	(Finland)	Muurinen, Miikka	2.10 m (6 ft 11 in)	92 kg (203 lb)	18 – 4 March 2007
G	4	(Germany) (United States)	Washington Jr., Duane	1.88 m (6 ft 2 in)	89 kg (196 lb)	25 – 24 March 2000
F/C	5	(United States) (Germany)	Osetkowski, Dylan	2.06 m (6 ft 9 in)	109 kg (240 lb)	29 – 8 August 1996
SF	7	(Serbia) (Croatia)	Nakić, Mario (injured)	2.02 m (6 ft 8 in)	97 kg (214 lb)	24 – 14 June 2001
SF	8	(Serbia)	Bošnjaković, Mitar	2.01 m (6 ft 7 in)	90 kg (198 lb)	19 – 24 August 2006
G/F	9	(Serbia)	Marinković, Vanja (C)	1.99 m (6 ft 6 in)	90 kg (198 lb)	28 – 9 January 1997
SG	10	(Serbia)	Mijailović, Uroš (Y)	1.95 m (6 ft 5 in)		17 – 6 March 2008
F/C	11	(Serbia)	Pokuševski, Aleksej	2.13 m (7 ft 0 in)	95 kg (209 lb)	23 – 26 December 2001
G/F	12	(United States)	Brown, Sterling	1.96 m (6 ft 5 in)	99 kg (218 lb)	30 – 10 February 1995
F	17	(Germany) (Democratic Republic of the Congo)	Bonga, Isaac	2.03 m (6 ft 8 in)	95 kg (209 lb)	25 – 8 November 1999
G	19	(Serbia)	Lakić, Arijan	1.98 m (6 ft 6 in)	95 kg (209 lb)	25 – 20 January 2000
G	21	(Serbia)	Šekularac, Đorđe (TW)	1.98 m (6 ft 6 in)	85 kg (187 lb)	18 – 23 July 2007
PF	22	(United States)	Parker, Jabari	2.03 m (6 ft 8 in)	109 kg (240 lb)	30 – 15 March 1995
PG	24	(Romania)	Illeș, Luca (TW)	1.96 m (6 ft 5 in)	90 kg (198 lb)	18 – 8 January 2007
G	35	(Slovenia)	Bojović, Lucas (Y)	1.97 m (6 ft 6 in)		17 – 18 June 2008
G/F	44	(Serbia)	Danilović, Uroš (TW)	2.01 m (6 ft 7 in)		18 – 15 September 2007
C	88	(United States)	Jones, Tyrique	2.06 m (6 ft 9 in)	108 kg (238 lb)	28 – 3 May 1997
G		(Denmark)	Lundberg, Gabriel	1.93 m (6 ft 4 in)	92 kg (203 lb)	30 – 4 December 1994

Head coach

- (Serbia) Željko Obradović

Assistant coach(es)

- (Serbia) Vladimir Androić
- (Spain) Josep Maria Izquierdo
- (Serbia) Mirko Ocokoljić
- (Serbia) Aleksandar Matović

Athletic trainer(s)

- (Serbia) Predrag Zimonjić

Team manager

- (Serbia) Luka Vulikić

Legend

- (C) Team captain
- (Y) Youth player
- (TW) Two-way affiliate player
- Injured

- Roster
- Transactions
Updated: September 26, 2025

== Split ==
Note: Flags indicate national team eligibility at FIBA-sanctioned events. Players may hold other non-FIBA nationalities not displayed.

KK Split roster
Players
Coaches

Pos.	No.	Nat.	Name	Ht.	Age
G	0	(United States)	Myers, Teyvon	1.88 m (6 ft 2 in)	31 – 20 June 1994
SF	1	(Croatia)	Sikirić, Antonio	2.01 m (6 ft 7 in)	21 – 27 October 2003
PF	3	(Australia)	Anticevich, Grant	2.03 m (6 ft 8 in)	27 – 14 April 1998
SG	5	(Croatia)	Jordano, Antonio	1.91 m (6 ft 3 in)	26 – 25 February 1999
SF	6	(Croatia)	Perasović, Ivan	2.02 m (6 ft 8 in)	23 – 23 April 2002
G	10	(Croatia)	Kučić, Vito	1.91 m (6 ft 3 in)	23 – 28 March 2002
G	11	(Croatia)	Svoboda, Noa	1.91 m (6 ft 3 in)	22 – 22 January 2003
G	25	(Croatia)	Jemo, Roko	1.91 m (6 ft 3 in)	18 – 25 April 2007
G/F	30	(Slovenia)	Dragić, Zoran	1.96 m (6 ft 5 in)	36 – 22 June 1989
C	33	(United States)	Stephens, Jake	2.13 m (7 ft 0 in)	25 – 5 November 1999
C	34	(Croatia)	Bošnjak, Matej	2.05 m (6 ft 9 in)	23 – 8 January 2002
C	43	(Croatia)	Radošević, Leon	2.08 m (6 ft 10 in)	35 – 26 February 1990
PG	55	(Croatia)	Marinelli, Paolo	1.93 m (6 ft 4 in)	30 – 10 April 1995

Head coach

- (Croatia) Dino Repeša

Assistant coach(es)

- (Croatia) Ante Marović
- (Croatia) Jere Mrduljaš

Legend

- (C) Team captain
- Injured

- Roster
Updated: January 13, 2025

== Studentski centar ==
Note: Flags indicate national team eligibility at FIBA-sanctioned events. Players may hold other non-FIBA nationalities not displayed.

SC Derby roster
Players
Coaches

Pos.	No.	Nat.	Name	Ht.	Age
PG	0	(Montenegro)	Sudar, Vladimir	1.94 m (6 ft 4 in)	20 – 10 April 2005
SG	3	(Montenegro)	Bogavac, Luka	1.95 m (6 ft 5 in)	22 – 20 September 2003
PG	4	(Montenegro)	Pavličević, Nikola (C)	1.92 m (6 ft 4 in)	37 – 13 August 1988
SG	6	(Montenegro)	Vučeljić, Zoran	1.97 m (6 ft 6 in)	22 – 9 September 2003
F	8	(Montenegro)	Hadžibegović, Emir	2.06 m (6 ft 9 in)	29 – 24 August 1996
C	20	(Montenegro)	Čičić, Maruan	2.09 m (6 ft 10 in)	19 – 14 July 2006
G	22	(Montenegro)	Drobnjak, Igor	1.93 m (6 ft 4 in)	25 – 21 April 2000
SG	24	(Montenegro)	Todorović, Vasilije	1.94 m (6 ft 4 in)	20 – 21 January 2005
PF/C	70	(Montenegro)	Mirković, David	2.05 m (6 ft 9 in)	19 – 6 January 2006
SF		(Croatia)	Bogdanović, Ivan	2.01 m (6 ft 7 in)	21 – 13 July 2004
PG		(United States)	Neal, Erick	1.78 m (5 ft 10 in)	30 – 15 March 1995
C		(Montenegro)	Nikolić, Zoran	2.12 m (6 ft 11 in)	29 – 1 April 1996
G		(United States)	Turner, Justin	1.93 m (6 ft 4 in)	27 – 12 March 1998
G		(Montenegro)	Živanović, Balša	1.88 m (6 ft 2 in)	24 – 6 April 2001
PF		(Montenegro)	Ilić, Aleksa	2.04 m (6 ft 8 in)	29 – 17 September 1996
F		(Croatia)	Dujaković, Zvonimir	2.07 m (6 ft 9 in)	17 – 8 May 2008
F		(United States)	Davis, Jyare	2.01 m (6 ft 7 in)	23 – 8 January 2002
SG		(Croatia)	Drežnjak, Mateo	1.96 m (6 ft 5 in)	26 – 8 March 1999
F		(Canada)	Boakye, Enoch	2.11 m (6 ft 11 in)	22 – 24 May 2003
PG		(United States)	Johnson, Darius	1.85 m (6 ft 1 in)

Head coach

- (Montenegro) Petar Mijovic

Assistant coach(es)

- (Serbia) Goran Stevanović
- (Montenegro) Boro Stanišić
- (Montenegro) Duško Vujošević (consultant)

Legend

- (C) Team captain
- Injured

- Roster
Updated: September 13, 2022

== Zadar ==
Note: Flags indicate national team eligibility at FIBA-sanctioned events. Players may hold other non-FIBA nationalities not displayed.

KK Zadar roster
Players
Coaches

Pos.	No.	Nat.	Name	Ht.	Age
G	1	(Montenegro)	Mihailović, Vladimir	1.95 m (6 ft 5 in)	35 – 10 August 1990
F	2	(United States)	Beech, Beau	2.01 m (6 ft 7 in)	31 – 1 March 1994
F	4	(Croatia)	Gulan, Luka	1.97 m (6 ft 6 in)	17 – 7 October 2007
G	5	(Croatia)	Bičić, Luka	1.77 m (5 ft 10 in)	17 – 2 October 2007
F	6	(Croatia)	Klarica, Krševan	2.00 m (6 ft 7 in)	21 – 10 November 2003
F	7	(Croatia)	Tišma, Boris	2.05 m (6 ft 9 in)	23 – 20 February 2002
PF	9	(Croatia)	Žganec, Karlo	2.06 m (6 ft 9 in)	30 – 25 July 1995
F	14	(Croatia)	Mazalin, Lovro	2.04 m (6 ft 8 in)	28 – 27 June 1997
C	17	(Croatia)	Božiković, Alexander	2.07 m (6 ft 9 in)	16 – 19 December 2008
F	23	(United States)	Martinez, Jayden	2.01 m (6 ft 7 in)	25 – 9 January 2000
F	25	(Croatia)	Dundović, Manuel	1.93 m (6 ft 4 in)	19 – 25 October 2005
G	44	(Croatia)	Kapusta, Borna	1.82 m (6 ft 0 in)	29 – 24 July 1996
SF	46	(Croatia)	Ramljak, Marko	2.01 m (6 ft 7 in)	32 – 14 March 1993
G	99	(Croatia)	Torbarina, Toni	1.86 m (6 ft 1 in)	19 – 19 September 2006

Head coach

- (Croatia) Danijel Jusup

Assistant coach(es)

- (Croatia) Toni Dijan
- (Croatia) Ivan Barančić
- (Croatia) Boris Kovačević

Strength & conditioning coach(es)

- (Croatia) Bernard Kotlar

Physician(s)

- (Croatia) Mladen Srzentić

Physiotherapist(s)

- (Croatia) Šime Gulan

Legend

- (C) Team captain
- Injured

- Roster
Updated: August 31, 2025

== See also ==
- List of current ABA League Second Division team rosters
- List of current Basketball League of Serbia team rosters
