= 2016–17 ABA League =

Basketball season

ABA League
- Season: 2016–17
- Duration: September 29, 2016 – March 13, 2017 (Regular season); March 18, 2017 – April 13, 2017 (Playoffs)
- Games played: 191
- Teams: 14
- TV partner: Arena Sport

Regular season
- Top seed: (Serbia) Crvena zvezda mts
- Season MVP: (Serbia) Nikola Janković ^{[1]}
- Relegated: (Slovenia) Krka

Finals
- Champions: (Serbia) Crvena zvezda mts (3rd title)
- Runners-up: (Croatia) Cedevita
- Semi-finalists: (Serbia) Partizan NIS (Montenegro) Budućnost VOLI
- Finals MVP: (United States) Charles Jenkins ^{[2]}

Awards
- Top Prospect: (Australia) Jonah Bolden ^{[3]}

Statistical leaders
Points	(Serbia) Ivan Marinković (Zadar)	17.72
Rebounds	(France) Alpha Kaba (Mega Leks)	7.52
Assists	(United States) Scottie Reynolds (Cibona)	6.94
Index Rating	(Serbia) Nikola Janković (Olimpija)	19.24

Records
- Biggest home win: Cedevita 120–62 Zadar (8 October 2016)^{Biggest win in the ABA League history}
- Biggest away win: Zadar 66–103 Crvena zvezda mts (6 October 2016); Karpoš Sokoli 61–98 Crvena zvezda mts (14 February 2017)
- Highest scoring: Mornar 104–110 Zadar (13 November 2016)

The 2016–17 ABA League was the 16th season of the ABA League, with 14 teams from Serbia, Croatia, Slovenia, Montenegro, Bosnia and Herzegovina and the Republic of Macedonia participating in it. It started on September 29, 2016, with the first round of the regular season and the regular season ended on March 13, 2017, followed by playoffs of the four best placed teams. The play-offs were played from March 18 till April 13, 2017. Crvena zvezda won its third ABA League championship, after beating Cedevita 3–0 in the Finals.

== Teams ==
=== National standings ===
The numbers of teams by country is determined by a coefficient that is the sum of all victories clubs from a certain country achieve in a regular season divided by the number of clubs from that country. By using this coefficient majority of places for current season are allocated, while the remaining places are given via wild cards from league board.

Country	No.	2015–16 coeff.	2016–17 no. of clubs
Montenegro	1	16.00	2
Serbia	3	14.75	4
Croatia	3	14.00	3
Bosnia and Herzegovina	1	11.00	1
Macedonia	1	10.00	1
Slovenia	2	9.33	2
Wild card			1
Total	11	best coeff. (+2)	14

=== Team allocation ===
On 25 July 2016 the Adriatic Basketball Association agreed to expel Union Olimpija and Helios Suns as the first was not able to fulfill the financial obligations required and the second did not follow the position of all the clubs of the Association in the FIBA-Euroleague controversy. Finally, Union Olimpija was re-admitted in the league and Macedonian runner-up Karpoš Sokoli replaced Helios Suns.

League positions of the previous national league season after playoffs shown in parentheses (RW: Regular season winners).

Regular season
(Montenegro) Budućnost VOLI (1st)	(Serbia) Mega Leks (3rd)	(Croatia) Zadar (3rd)	(Slovenia) Krka (RW)
(Montenegro) Mornar (2nd)	(Serbia) FMP (4th)	(Bosnia and Herzegovina) Igokea (1st)	(Slovenia) Union Olimpija (4th)
(Serbia) Crvena zvezda mts (1st)	(Croatia) Cedevita (1st)	(North Macedonia) MZT Skopje Aerodrom (1st)	
(Serbia) Partizan NIS (2nd)	(Croatia) Cibona (2nd)	(North Macedonia) Karpoš Sokoli (3rd)	

=== Venues and locations ===
Location of teams in the 2016–17 ABA League

Team	Home city	Arena	Capacity
Budućnost VOLI	Podgorica	Morača Sports Center	4,300
Cedevita	Zagreb	Dom Sportova	3,100
Cibona	Zagreb	Dražen Petrović Basketball Hall	5,400
Crvena zvezda mts	Belgrade	Hall Aleksandar Nikolić	5,878
FMP	Železnik	Železnik Hall	3,000
Igokea	Aleksandrovac	Laktaši Sports Hall	3,050
Karpoš Sokoli	Skopje	Boris Trajkovski Sports Center	8,000
Krka	Novo Mesto	Leon Štukelj Hall	2,000
Mega Leks	Sremska Mitrovica	Sports Hall Pinki	2,500
Mornar	Bar	Topolica Sport Hall	2,625
MZT Skopje Aerodrom	Skopje	Jane Sandanski Arena	7,500
Partizan NIS	Belgrade	Hall Aleksandar Nikolić	6,500
Union Olimpija	Ljubljana	Arena Stožice	12,480
Zadar	Zadar	Krešimir Ćosić Hall	9,000

=== Personnel and sponsorship ===
Team	Head coach	Captain	Kit manufacturer	Shirt sponsor
Budućnost VOLI	(Greece) Ilias Zouros	(Montenegro) Suad Šehović	daCAPO	VOLI
Cedevita	(Croatia) Veljko Mršić	(Croatia) Miro Bilan	Nike	Cedevita
Cibona	(Croatia) Damir Mulaomerović	(Croatia) Marin Rozić	Adidas	Franck
Crvena zvezda mts	(Montenegro) Dejan Radonjić	(Serbia) Luka Mitrović	Champion	mts
FMP	(Serbia) Branko Maksimović	(Serbia) Filip Čović	Champion	FMP
Igokea	(Bosnia and Herzegovina) Dragan Bajić	(Serbia) Vuk Radivojević	GBT	m:tel
Karpoš Sokoli	(Serbia) Dragan Nikolić	(North Macedonia) Igor Penov	Erreà	—
Krka	(Slovenia) Simon Petrov	(Slovenia) Matej Rojc	Žolna šport	Krka
Mega Leks	(Serbia) Dejan Milojević	(Serbia) Rade Zagorac	Adidas	Bemax
Mornar	(Montenegro) Đorđije Pavićević	(Montenegro) Marko Mijović	Adidas	—
MZT Skopje Aerodrom	(Croatia) Ante Nazor	(North Macedonia) Marko Simonovski	Adidas	—
Partizan NIS	(Serbia) Aleksandar Džikić	(Serbia) Novica Veličković	Adidas	NIS
Union Olimpija	(Slovenia) Gašper Okorn	(Slovenia) Mirko Mulalić	Macron	Pivovarna Union
Zadar	(Croatia) Aramis Naglić	(Croatia) Lovre Bašić	Champion	OTP Bank

=== Coaching changes ===
Week	Club	Outgoing coach	Date of change	Incoming coach
4th	MZT Skopje Aerodrom	(North Macedonia) Emil Rajković	10 October 2016	(North Macedonia) Aleksandar Jončevski
7th	Karpoš Sokoli	(Serbia) Siniša Matić	2–3 November 2016	(Serbia) Dragan Nikolić
9th	Budućnost VOLI	(Montenegro) Vlado Šćepanović	13–15 November 2016	(Greece) Ilias Zouros
9th	MZT Skopje Aerodrom	(North Macedonia) Aleksandar Jončevski	14–18 November 2016	(Croatia) Ante Nazor
10th	FMP	(Serbia) Slobodan Klipa	20 November 2016	(Serbia) Branko Maksimović
10th	Zadar	(Croatia) Ante Matulović	21–29 November 2016	(Croatia) Neven Plantak
20th	Zadar	(Croatia) Neven Plantak	30–31 January 2017	(Croatia) Aramis Naglić
24th	Krka	(Slovenia) Dejan Mihevc	26 February 2017	(Slovenia) Simon Petrov

== Regular season ==
=== League table ===
Pos	Team	Pld	W	L	PF	PA	PD	Pts	Qualification or relegation
1	(Serbia) Crvena zvezda mts	26	25	1	2226	1762	+464	51	Advance to the playoffs
2	(Croatia) Cedevita	26	20	6	2323	2108	+215	46	Advance to the playoffs
3	(Serbia) Partizan NIS	26	19	7	2081	1948	+133	45	Advance to the playoffs
4	(Montenegro) Budućnost VOLI	26	18	8	2136	1968	+168	44	Advance to the playoffs
5	(Bosnia and Herzegovina) Igokea	26	13	13	1950	2017	−67	39	
6	(Serbia) Mega Leks	26	11	15	2138	2145	−7	37	
7	(Croatia) Cibona	26	11	15	2100	2121	−21	37	
8	(Montenegro) Mornar	26	10	16	2002	2011	−9	36	
9	(Serbia) FMP	26	10	16	2047	2118	−71	36	
10	(North Macedonia) Karpoš Sokoli	26	10	16	1951	2096	−145	36	
11	(Slovenia) Union Olimpija	26	10	16	2066	2143	−77	36	
12	(Croatia) Zadar	26	9	17	2044	2257	−213	35	
13	(North Macedonia) MZT Skopje Aerodrom	26	8	18	1994	2136	−142	34	
14	(Slovenia) Krka	26	8	18	1889	2117	−228	34	Relegation to the Second Division

Source: ABA League

=== Results ===
Home \ Away	BUD	CED	CIB	CZV	FMP	IGO	KAR	KRK	MEG	MOR	MZT	PAR	UOL	ZAD
Budućnost VOLI (Montenegro)		84–86	95–79	54–77	93–84	75–60	95–61	91–62	88–80	85–68	92–61	74–68	84–74	105–89
Cedevita (Croatia)	70–80		100–80	91–95	104–92	89–78	81–77	82–83	89–85	99–73	82–61	79–67	102–87	120–62
Cibona (Croatia)	87–94	85–89		70–91	87–68	84–61	102–79	88–65	88–100	91–89	87–79	77–82	68–79	82–73
Crvena zvezda mts (Serbia)	82–66	88–64	69–56		93–62	68–66	91–70	79–62	96–76	82–71	91–69	83–72	88–67	113–65
FMP (Serbia)	69–77	89–96	84–75	76–84		76–81	67–62	78–60	98–84	92–85	101–82	56–65	89–79	94–77
Igokea (Bosnia and Herzegovina)	92–93	69–84	61–71	68–77	74–84		79–71	85–72	64–67	74–69	79–72	70–64	73–72	78–77
Karpoš Sokoli (North Macedonia)	77–71	89–81	76–70	61–98	88–81	79–84		83–56	75–72	75–63	77–74	77–84	83–87	85–79
Krka (Slovenia)	67–75	90–86	95–91	56–67	61–70	72–88	81–64		73–82	63–72	97–87	70–82	63–68	80–79
Mega Leks (Serbia)	81–85	82–85	71–82	69–81	76–72	101–84	82–69	95–96		93–87	87–72	80–87	86–85	92–75
Mornar (Montenegro)	78–71	74–79	92–57	59–71	82–66	83–76	83–59	86–73	81–89		65–64	57–58	93–70	104–110
MZT Skopje Aerodrom (North Macedonia)	96–90	79–100	85–89	73–93	89–68	67–71	74–71	89–65	75–74	63–69		62–93	97–96	92–65
Partizan NIS (Serbia)	61–64	87–97	87–81	86–81	97–70	87–64	76–72	94–80	86–79	90–85	91–76		86–85	87–86
Union Olimpija (Slovenia)	81–79	92–94	72–89	67–85	89–85	80–81	92–97	79–64	82–69	81–72	72–91	74–68		78–76
Zadar (Croatia)	78–76	80–94	85–84	66–103	78–76	83–90	93–74	77–83	90–86	80–62	71–65	69–76	81–78	

Legend: Blue = home team win; Red = away team win.

== Playoffs ==
The semi-finals were played in a best-of-three format, while the Finals were played in a best-of-five format. The Playoffs started on March 18 and ended on April 13, 2017.

Semifinals; 18 March – 4 April
(Serbia) Crvena zvezda mts	2
(Montenegro) Budućnost VOLI	1
(Croatia) Cedevita	2
(Serbia) Partizan NIS	1

Finals; 10 April – 13 April
(Serbia) Crvena zvezda mts	3
(Croatia) Cedevita	0

2016–17 ABA League Champions
(Serbia)
Crvena zvezda mts
3rd title

== Final standings ==
Pos	Team	Pld	W	L	PF	PA	PD	Pts	Qualification or relegation
1	(Serbia) Crvena zvezda mts	32	30	2	2689	2151	+538	62	Qualification to EuroLeague
2	(Croatia) Cedevita	32	22	10	2766	2578	+188	54	Qualification to EuroCup
3	(Serbia) Partizan NIS	29	20	9	2309	2191	+118	49	Qualification to EuroCup
4	(Montenegro) Budućnost VOLI	29	19	10	2325	2189	+136	48	Qualification to EuroCup
5	(Bosnia and Herzegovina) Igokea	26	13	13	1950	2017	−67	39	
6	(Serbia) Mega Leks	26	11	15	2138	2145	−7	37	
7	(Croatia) Cibona	26	11	15	2100	2121	−21	37	
8	(Montenegro) Mornar	26	10	16	2002	2011	−9	36	
9	(Serbia) FMP	26	10	16	2047	2118	−71	36	
10	(North Macedonia) Karpoš Sokoli	26	10	16	1951	2096	−145	36	
11	(Slovenia) Union Olimpija	26	10	16	2066	2143	−77	36	
12	(Croatia) Zadar	26	9	17	2044	2257	−213	35	
13	(North Macedonia) MZT Skopje Aerodrom	26	8	18	1994	2136	−142	34	
14	(Slovenia) Krka	26	8	18	1889	2117	−228	34	Relegation

Source: ABA League

== Statistical leaders ==
After the end of the Regular Season.

=== PIR ===
Pos	Player	Club	PIR
1	(Serbia) Nikola Janković	Union Olimpija	19.24
2	(United States) Ryan Boatright	Cedevita	18.33
3	(Serbia) Ivan Marinković	Zadar	17.52
4	(Serbia) Marko Luković	Krka	17.33
5	(Croatia) Luka Babić	Cedevita	17.06

=== Points ===
Pos	Player	Club	PPG
1	(Serbia) Ivan Marinković	Zadar	17.72
2	(United States) Ryan Boatright	Cedevita	17.47
3	(Serbia) Marko Luković	Krka	16.81
4	(Serbia) Nikola Janković	Union Olimpija	16.56
5	(Serbia) Dragan Labović	Karpoš Sokoli	15.62

=== Rebounds ===
Pos	Player	Club	RPG
1	(France) Alpha Kaba	Mega Leks	7.52
2	(Serbia) Marko Luković	Krka	7.43
3	(Australia) Jonah Bolden	FMP	7.24
4	(Serbia) Nikola Janković	Union Olimpija	7.24
5	(United States) Devin Oliver	Union Olimpija	7.16

=== Assists ===
Pos	Player	Club	APG
1	(United States) Scottie Reynolds	Cibona	6.94
2	(Serbia) Filip Čović	FMP	6.39
3	(United States) Marcus Williams	Budućnost VOLI	6.27
4	(Serbia) Stefan Jović	Crvena zvezda mts	6.14
5	(Slovenia) Matic Rebec	Krka	5.88

== Awards ==
=== MVP ===
Pos.	Player	Team	Ref.
F/C	(Serbia) Nikola Janković	(Slovenia) Union Olimpija	

=== Finals MVP ===
Pos.	Player	Team	Ref.
SG	(United States) Charles Jenkins	(Serbia) Crvena zvezda mts	

=== Top Prospect ===
Pos.	Player	Team	Ref.
F	(Australia) Jonah Bolden	(Serbia) FMP	

=== Ideal Starting Five ===
Pos.	Player	Team
PG	(Serbia) Stefan Jović	(Serbia) Crvena zvezda mts
SG	(United States) Charles Jenkins	(Serbia) Crvena zvezda mts
SF	(Serbia) Marko Simonović	(Serbia) Crvena zvezda mts
PF	(Serbia) Novica Veličković	(Serbia) Partizan NIS
C	(Croatia) Miro Bilan	(Croatia) Cedevita

== MVP List ==
=== MVP of the Round ===
Round	Player	Team	Efficiency
1	(Serbia) Ivan Marinković	(Croatia) Zadar	41
2	(United States) William Hatcher	(Serbia) Partizan NIS	31
3	(Croatia) Karlo Žganec	(Croatia) Cedevita	28
4	(Croatia) Ante Žižić	(Croatia) Cibona	56
5	(Croatia) Željko Šakić	(Croatia) Cibona (2)	30
6	(Croatia) Željko Šakić (2)	(Croatia) Cibona (3)	33
7	(Croatia) Ante Žižić (2)	(Croatia) Cibona (4)	31
8	(United States) Shawn James	(Montenegro) Budućnost VOLI	39
9	(Croatia) Boris Barać	(Croatia) Zadar (2)	40
10	(Croatia) Luka Babić	(Croatia) Cedevita (2)	31
11	(Serbia) Ognjen Kuzmić	(Serbia) Crvena zvezda mts	30
12	(Croatia) Ante Žižić (3)	(Croatia) Cibona (5)	43
13	(Serbia) Nikola Janković	(Slovenia) Union Olimpija	30
14	(Serbia) Dragan Apić	(Serbia) FMP	34
15	(Serbia) Marko Simonović	(Serbia) Crvena zvezda mts (2)	30
16	(Serbia) Luka Mitrović	(Serbia) Crvena zvezda mts (3)	32
17	(Serbia) Filip Čović	(Serbia) FMP (2)	42
18	(Croatia) Luka Babić (2)	(Croatia) Cedevita (3)	34
19	(United States) Antabia Waller	(Montenegro) Mornar	34
20	(Serbia) Filip Čović (2)	(Serbia) FMP (3)	34
21	(Serbia) Dragan Labović	(North Macedonia) Karpoš Sokoli	30
22	(United States) Josh Scott	(North Macedonia) MZT Skopje Aerodrom	34
23	(Serbia) Stefan Birčević	(Serbia) Partizan NIS (2)	33
24	(Croatia) Boris Barać (2)	(Croatia) Zadar (3)	30
25	(United States) Kendrick Perry	(North Macedonia) Karpoš Sokoli (2)	30
26	(Croatia) Miro Bilan	(Croatia) Cedevita (4)	31
SF1	(Serbia) Ognjen Kuzmić (2)	(Serbia) Crvena zvezda mts (4)	21
SF2	(Serbia) Stefan Birčević (2)	(Serbia) Partizan NIS (3)	29
SF3	(United States) Charles Jenkins	(Serbia) Crvena zvezda mts (5)	24
F1	(United States) Charles Jenkins (2)	(Serbia) Crvena zvezda mts (6)	24
F2	(United States) Charles Jenkins (3)	(Serbia) Crvena zvezda mts (7)	23
F3	(United States) Deon Thompson	(Serbia) Crvena zvezda mts (8)	24

=== MVP of the Month ===
Month	Player	Team	Ref.
October 2016	(Croatia) Ante Žižić	(Croatia) Cibona	
November 2016	(Croatia) Luka Babić	(Croatia) Cedevita	
December 2016	(Serbia) Nikola Janković	(Slovenia) Union Olimpija	
January 2017	(Serbia) Filip Čović	(Serbia) FMP	
February 2017	(Serbia) Stefan Birčević	(Serbia) Partizan NIS	

== 2016–17 national standings ==
Position	Country	Coefficient
1	Serbia	16.25
2	Montenegro	14.00
3	Croatia	13.33
4	Bosnia and Herzegovina	13.00
5	Slovenia	9.00
5	Macedonia	9.00

== ABA League clubs in European competitions ==
Competition	Team	Progress	Result
EuroLeague	(Serbia) Crvena zvezda mts	Regular season	9th place
EuroCup	(Croatia) Cedevita	Top 16 Group H	3rd place
EuroCup	(North Macedonia) MZT Skopje Aerodrom	Regular season Group A	5th place
EuroCup	(Montenegro) Budućnost VOLI	Regular season Group C	5th place
EuroCup	(Slovenia) Union Olimpija	Regular season Group D	5th place
FIBA Champions League	(Serbia) Partizan NIS	Play-offs qualifiers	Eliminated by (Greece) PAOK, 154–156
FIBA Champions League	(Croatia) Cibona	Regular season Group D	6th place, transferred to FIBA Europe Cup
FIBA Champions League	(Serbia) Mega Leks	Regular season Group D	7th place
FIBA Champions League	(Montenegro) Mornar	Regular season Group D	8th place
FIBA Champions League	(Bosnia and Herzegovina) Igokea	Second qualifying round	Eliminated by (Montenegro) Mornar, 131–152
FIBA Europe Cup	(Croatia) Cibona	Quarter-finals	Eliminated by (France) Élan Chalon, 165–168
FIBA Europe Cup	(Bosnia and Herzegovina) Igokea	Regular season Group I	Withdrew

== See also ==
- List of current ABA Liga team rosters

2016–17 domestic competitions

- 2016–17 Basketball League of Serbia
- (Croatia) 2016–17 A-1 League
- (Slovenia) 2016–17 Slovenian Basketball League
- (Montenegro) 2016–17 Prva A liga
- 2016–17 Basketball Championship of Bosnia and Herzegovina
- (North Macedonia) 2016–17 Macedonian First League
