= Uroš Luković =

Serbian basketball player (born 1989)

Personal information
- Born: June 8, 1989 (age 37) Belgrade, SR Serbia, SFR Yugoslavia
- Listed height: 2.13 m (7 ft 0 in)
- Listed weight: 98 kg (216 lb)

Career information
- NBA draft: 2011: undrafted
- Playing career: 2007–present
- Position: Center

Career history
- 2007–2011: FMP
- 2009–2010: →Radnički Basket
- 2011–2013: Kumanovo
- 2013: Tartu Ülikool/Rock
- 2013–2014: Kumanovo
- 2014: Kožuv
- 2014–2015: Kumanovo
- 2015–2016: MZT Skopje
- 2016–2017: Partizan
- 2017–2021: Mornar
- 2021: Zadar
- 2021: Lovćen 1947
- 2022–2023: Metalac
- 2023–2024: Mornar
- 2024–2026: Kumanovo

Career highlights
- Macedonian League champion (2016); Montenegrin League champion (2018); Macedonian Cup winner (2016); 3× All-Macedonian League Team (2013, 2014, 2016); Macedonian League MVP (2014); 3× ABA League blocks leader (2016, 2017, 2018); All-ABA League Team (2018)

Uroš Luković (Serbian Cyrillic: Урош Луковић; born June 8, 1989) is a Serbian professional basketball player who last played for MKK Kumanovo in the Macedonian First League.

== Professional career ==
Luković played in youth categories with KK Torlak from Belgrade. In August 2007, he signed a four-year contract with FMP Železnik. For the 2009–10 season he was loaned to Radnički Basket. In March 2011, he signed with the Spanish club CAI Zaragoza. After only one month with Zaragoza, he broke his leg and later left the club before making his official debut.

In 2011, Luković signed with Kumanovo of the Macedonian League. After two seasons with Kumanovo, in August 2013, he moved to the Estonian club Tartu Ülikool/Rock. He left Tartu in November 2013. The next month, he returned to Kumanovo for the rest of the 2013–14 season. In September 2014, he signed with Kožuv. On December 4, 2014, he parted ways with Kožuv. Two days later, he returned to Kumanovo. In December 2015, he parted ways with Kumanovo. On December 15, 2015, he signed with MZT Skopje for the rest of the season. On August 9, 2016, he signed a two-year contract with Partizan.

On July 8, 2017, Luković signed a two-year contract with Mornar. He left Mornar following the end of the 2020–21 season.

On July 29, 2021, Luković signed a one-year contract with the Croatian team Zadar. In November, 2021, Luković left Zadar. On December 6, 2021, Luković signed a contract with the Montenegrin team KK Lovćen 1947. On January 25, 2022, Luković signed a contract with the Serbian team Metalac Valjevo.

On December 1, 2023, signed a contract with Mornar to return to the club. During the 2023–24 season, he averaged 7.8 points and 5.3 rebounds on 62.3% shooting from the field. For the 2024–25 season, he returned to Kumanovo for the fourth time.

== Personal life ==
Uroš comes from a basketball family. In fact, his father Ljubisav Luković, is a former basketball player and current basketball coach, and his mother is also former basketball player. Uroš has a younger brother Marko and sister Branka who are also professional basketball players.
