= Aleksandar Bursać =

Serbian basketball player

Personal information
- Born: 19 March 1995 (age 31) Ruma, FR Yugoslavia
- Listed height: 2.05 m (6 ft 9 in)

Career information
- Playing career: 2012–present
- Position: Power forward

Career history
- 2012–2013: Vršac
- 2013–2014: Vojvodina
- 2014–2015: Vojvodina Srbijagas
- 2015–2019: FMP
- 2020–2022: Zadar
- 2022: Girona
- 2022–2023: MZT Skopje
- 2023–2024: Mornar
- 2025: Krka
- 2025–2026: OKK Sloboda Tuzla

Career highlights
- Croatian League champion (2021); Macedonian League champion (2023); Croatian Cup winner (2021); Macedonian Cup winner (2023)

Aleksandar Bursać (Serbian Cyrillic: Александар Бурсаћ; born 19 March 1995) is a Serbian professional basketball player.

== Professional career ==
In July 2020, Bursać signed for the Croatian team Zadar. On 1 July 2021, he signed a one-year contract extension with Zadar. In November 2022, he signed for MZT Skopje.
