= Trey Lewis (basketball) =

American basketball player (born 1992)

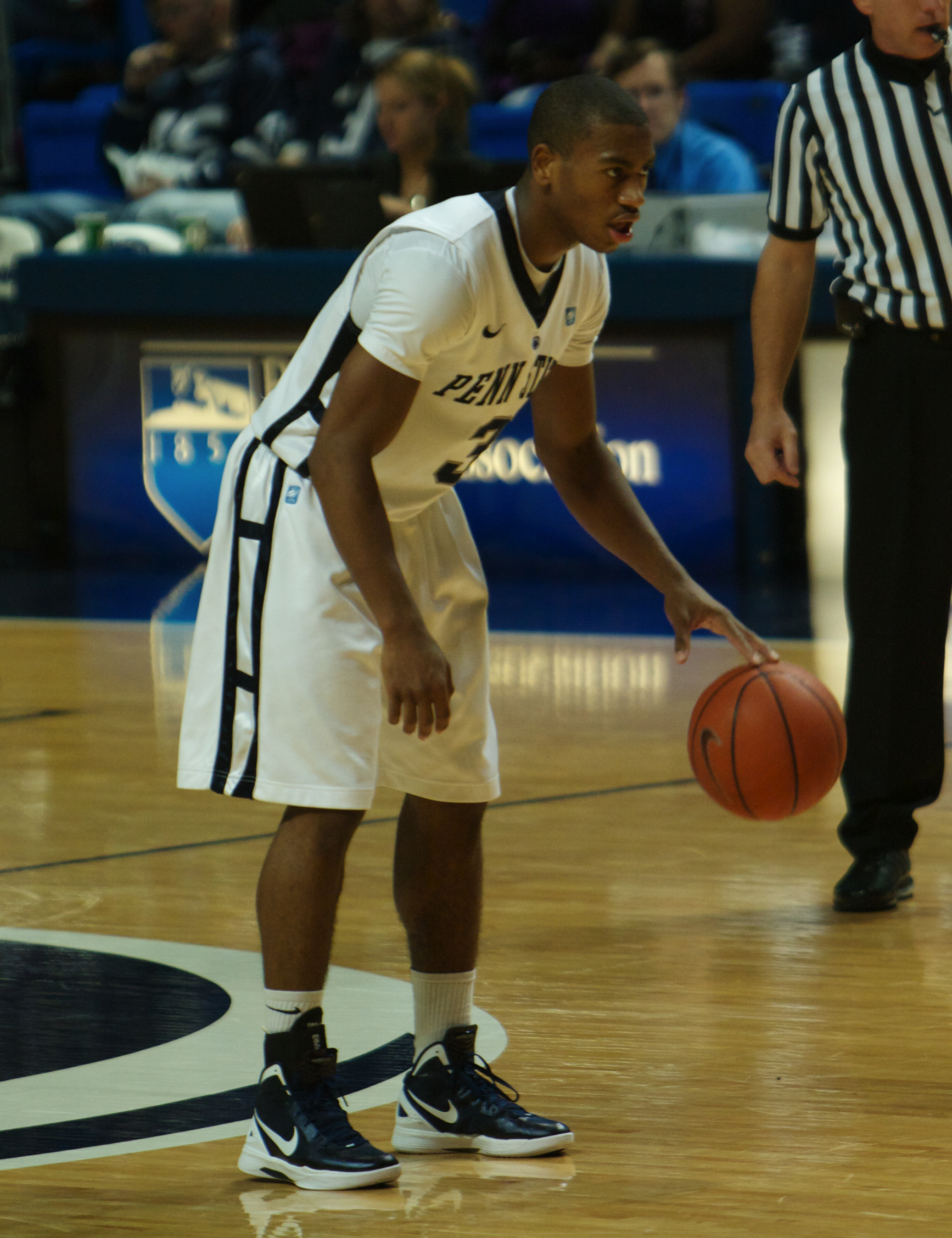
- Lewis playing for Penn State

Personal information
- Born: October 18, 1992 (age 34)
- Listed height: 6 ft 2 in (1.88 m)
- Listed weight: 185 lb (84 kg)

Career information
- High school: Garfield Heights (Garfield Heights, Ohio)
- College: Penn State (2011–2012); Cleveland State (2013–2015); Louisville (2015–2016)
- NBA draft: 2016: undrafted
- Playing career: 2016–2022
- Position: Point guard

Career history
- 2016–2017: Medi Bayreuth
- 2017–2018: ratiopharm Ulm
- 2018: Bourg
- 2018–2019: Salt Lake City Stars
- 2019–2020: BCM Gravelines-Dunkerque
- 2020–2021: Maccabi Rishon LeZion
- 2021–2022: Mornar

Career highlights
- First-team All-Horizon League (2015)
- Stats at Basketball Reference

Joseph "Trey" Lewis III (born October 18, 1992) is an American former professional basketball player who most recently played for Mornar of the ABA League and the Montenegrin League. He played college basketball for Penn State, Cleveland State, and Louisville.

== Early life ==
Lewis was a successful basketball player while at Garfield Heights in his hometown of Garfield Heights, Ohio, leading the team to three conference titles in his four years there. As a senior, he averaged 23 points, 5.1 assists and 4.8 rebounds per game, leading the team to a 24–2 record, the best in school history. Garfield Heights went to the state semifinals his senior year, losing to Trey Burke and Northland High School. Lewis received several awards in his senior year, being named co-player of the year in Division I with Burke. He was recruited to Penn State by assistant coach Lewis Preston.

== College career ==
By the time Lewis arrived at Penn State, head coach Ed DeChellis departed for Navy and was replaced by Pat Chambers. In his first game, a win over Youngstown State, Lewis led PSU with 35 points. Lewis started six games and averaged 5.6 points and 1.4 rebounds per game while the Nittany Lions finished with a 12–20 record. After the season Lewis, who missed a dozen games due to a back injury, transferred to Cleveland State. "I wouldn't trade my one year at Penn State for anything," Lewis said. "But it's tough when you're not the guy the coach recruited."

Due to NCAA regulations, Lewis was forced to sit out a year as a redshirt, which he used to rehabilitate his back. As a sophomore, Lewis averaged 13.1 points per game, second on the team to Bryn Forbes, and led the team to a 21–12 record. As a junior, in the fifth game of the season, Lewis finished with 24 points in a 45–33 loss to Louisville. He led the league with 96 three-pointers, a school single-season record, shooting 42.3 percent from behind the arc. Lewis finished with 16.3 points, 4.4 rebounds and 2.9 assists per game on the season and twice scored more than 30 points. Lewis was named to the First-team All-Horizon League. After the season he decided to transfer to Louisville, selecting the Cardinals over offers from Ohio State and Xavier, and was not required to sit out a season since he graduated from Cleveland State. "What it came down to was the need and the want from Louisville was the perfect situation for me and what I'm looking for going into this last year," Lewis said.

In Lewis's final season he sought to reach the NCAA Tournament, in which the Cardinals regularly participated. However, since Louisville was involved in a scandal over their recruitment efforts, the college itself declared the team ineligible for a postseason attendance very early in the season, much to the dismay of Lewis. Along with fellow graduate transfer Damion Lee, Lewis cried after hearing the news. He averaged 11.3 points, 3.4 rebounds, and 2.3 assists per game in his final collegiate season. He had a season-high 22 points and five assists against Virginia Tech. Lewis made 27 starts and helped Louisville finish the season 23–8.

== Professional career ==
In the 2016 NBA draft, Lewis was not selected by any team in the NBA, but in the 2016 NBA Summer League, he played for the Cleveland Cavaliers. Lewis decided to start his professional career in Europe and signed in a contract with the German first division club medi Bayreuth on July 23, 2016. In his rookie season, he posted 15.3 points, 2.6 rebounds, and 2.1 assists per game, shooting 44.7% on three-pointers. Lewis was named among the ten best players of the season in the "BBL All-Second Team".

For the following season in 2017–18, Lewis moved to German league rivals Ratiopharm Ulm, signing a deal in July 2017. In January 2018 Lewis was once again a participant in the BBL All-Star Game. He averaged 11.6 points, 2.1 assists and 1.8 rebounds per game and also appearing in 10 EuroCup matches. On February 25, 2018, he signed with JL Bourg Basket of the French first division. Lewis posted 17.2 points, 3.9 assists and 3.2 rebounds per game in France.

In the 2018 NBA Summer League, Lewis played for the Utah Jazz, where he was teammates with former Louisville teammate Donovan Mitchell. Lewis averaged 9.0 points, 3.0 rebounds and 2.3 assists per game in four games. On August 28, 2018, he signed with the Jazz. Lewis was waived by the Jazz on October 3, 2018. He then joined the Jazz's NBA G League affiliate, the Salt Lake City Stars.

On July 27, 2019, he signed with BCM Gravelines-Dunkerque of the LNB Pro A. Lewis parted ways with the team on January 28, 2020, after averaging 14 points, 3.8 rebounds and 2.7 assists per game. On October 28, he signed with Maccabi Rishon LeZion of the Israeli Premier League. Lewis averaged 14.3 points and 1.9 assists per game in the Winner League. On July 24, 2021, he signed with Mornar of the ABA League and the Montenegrin League.
