= Žarko Milaković =

Bosnian professional basketball coach (born 1982)

Free agent
- Position: Head coach

Personal information
- Born: March 3, 1982 (age 44) Banja Luka, SR Bosnia and Herzegovina, SFR Yugoslavia
- Listed height: 5 ft 10 in (1.78 m)
- Coaching career: 2007–present

Career history

Coaching
- 2014–2018: Igokea (youth)
- 2015–2016: Kozara Gradiška
- 2016–2018: Student Igokea
- 2018: Igokea
- 2018: Igokea (assistant)
- 2018: Igokea
- 2018–2020: Igokea (youth)
- 2020–2021: Mladost Mrkonjić Grad
Medals
Men's basketball
Assistant Coach for Serbia
U18 European Championship
Gold medal – first place	2018 Latvia	U18 Team

Žarko Milaković (Serbian Cyrillic: Жарко Милаковић; born March 3, 1982) is a Bosnian professional basketball coach.

== Coaching career ==
Milaković started his coaching in 2007. In the first few years he coached U16 and U18 teams in Banja Luka. In 2014, he became the youth coach for the Igokea. Also, he coached Kozara Gradiška and Student Igokea of the First Republika Srpska League. In 2018, he won the Republika Srpska Cup with Student Igokea.

On April 2, 2018, Milaković became a head coach for Igokea. In July 2018, he became an assistant coach for Igokea, after Nenad Trajković had been named as the Igokea head coach. He parted ways with Igokea in December 2018.

=== National teams ===
Milaković was an assistant coach of the U20 Serbia national team at the 2016 FIBA U20 European Championship in Helsinki, Finland.

Milaković was an assistant coach of the U18 Serbia national team that won the gold medal at the 2018 FIBA U18 European Championship in Latvia.
