= Nemanja Vranješ =

Bosnian-born Montenegrin basketball player

Personal information
- Born: May 11, 1988 (age 38) Sanski Most, SR Bosnia-Herzegovina, Yugoslavia
- Listed height: 1.89 m (6 ft 2 in)
- Listed weight: 88 kg (194 lb)

Career information
- NBA draft: 2010: undrafted
- Playing career: 2006–present
- Position: Shooting guard

Career history
- 2006–2009: Sutjeska
- 2009–2010: HEO
- 2010–2011: Borac Banja Luka
- 2011–2012: Sutjeska
- 2012–2013: Pagrati
- 2013–2014: Kumanovo
- 2014–2016: Sutjeska
- 2016–2017: Budućnost Podgorica
- 2017–2024: Mornar Bar

Career highlights
- 2× Montenegrin League champion (2017, 2018); Montenegrin Cup winner (2017)
Medals
Men's basketball
Representing Montenegro
Games of the Small States of Europe
Silver medal – second place	2017 San Marino	Team

Nemanja Vranješ (Serbian Cyrillic: Немања Врањеш; born May 11, 1988) is a Montenegrin professional basketball player currently playing for Mornar Bar of the Montenegrin League.
