= Milija Miković =

Montenegrin basketball player

No. 23 – Mornar Barsko zlato
- Position: Power forward / center
- League: ABA League; Montenegrin League

Personal information
- Born: March 25, 1994 (age 32) Bar, FR Yugoslavia
- Listed height: 2.05 m (6 ft 9 in)
- Listed weight: 107 kg (236 lb)

Career information
- NBA draft: 2016: undrafted
- Playing career: 2012–present

Career history
- 2012–2016: Mornar Bar
- 2016–2017: Šentjur
- 2017–2018: Bosna Royal
- 2018–2019: Zalakerámia ZTE
- 2019–2020: Gorica
- 2020–2021: Šibenka
- 2021–present: Mornar Bar

Career highlights
- Croatian League Top Scorer (2021)

Milija Miković (Serbian Cyrillic: Милија Миковић; born March 25, 1994) is a Montenegrin professional basketball player for Mornar Bar of the Montenegrin Basketball League and the ABA League. .

== Professional career ==
Miković started his career in his hometown of Bar, with Mornar. In the 2013–14 domestic league season, Miković played a total of 27 games averaging 25.1 minutes per game while scoring 11.3 points per game.

During the summer of 2014, Miković went on trial with the Serbian club Partizan. In August 2016, he signed a contract with the Slovenian club Šentjur.

== International career ==
At the 2014 FIBA Europe Under-20 Championship, Miković represented his country and averaged 18.3 points, 9 rebounds and 1.4 assists per game over 9 games played. He was also the second best scorer of the championship.
