= KK Mornar Bar =

Basketball club in Bar, Montenegro

Mornar Barsko zlato
- Leagues: ABA League 2 Montenegrin League
- Founded: 1974; 52 years ago
- History: KK Mornar (1974–2023)
- Arena: Topolica Sport Hall
- Capacity: 3,500 (expendable to 4,000)
- Location: Bar, Montenegro
- Team colors: Blue, Orange, White
- Main sponsor: Barsko Zlato
- President: Đorđije Pavićević
- General manager: Lazar Pavićević
- Head coach: Mihailo Pavićević
- Championships: 1 Montenegrin League
- Website: kkmornar.me
Home	Away

Košarkaški klub Mornar (Cyrillic: Кошаркашки клуб Морнар), commonly referred to as Mornar Barsko zlato for sponsorship reasons, is a men's professional basketball club based in Bar, Montenegro. The club competes in the Montenegrin Basketball League and the ABA 2 League.

The team also plays in international competitions. Mornar made its European debut in the Basketball Champions League during the 2016–17 season. Mornar won its first domestic title the following year in the 2017–18 Montenegrin League.

== History ==
In the 2015–16 season, Mornar managed to reach the Balkan League and Montenegrin League Finals but lost both. In the 2016–17 season, Mornar returned to European competition when it qualified for the Basketball Champions League regular season. The club also made its debut in the Adriatic League.

In its second ABA League season, the club qualified for the semifinals. In the playoff semifinals, Mornar was eliminated by Crvena zvezda, 2–1.

On 30 May 2018, Mornar achieved its first league ever by defeating Budućnost in the 2017–18 Montenegrin League finals.

In December 2020, the club became a shareholder of the Adriatic Basketball Association, following a transfer of shares from MZT Skopje Aerodrom.

On 11 September 2021, the club announced a change of their name to Mornar Barsko zlato for sponsorship reasons.

== Home arena ==
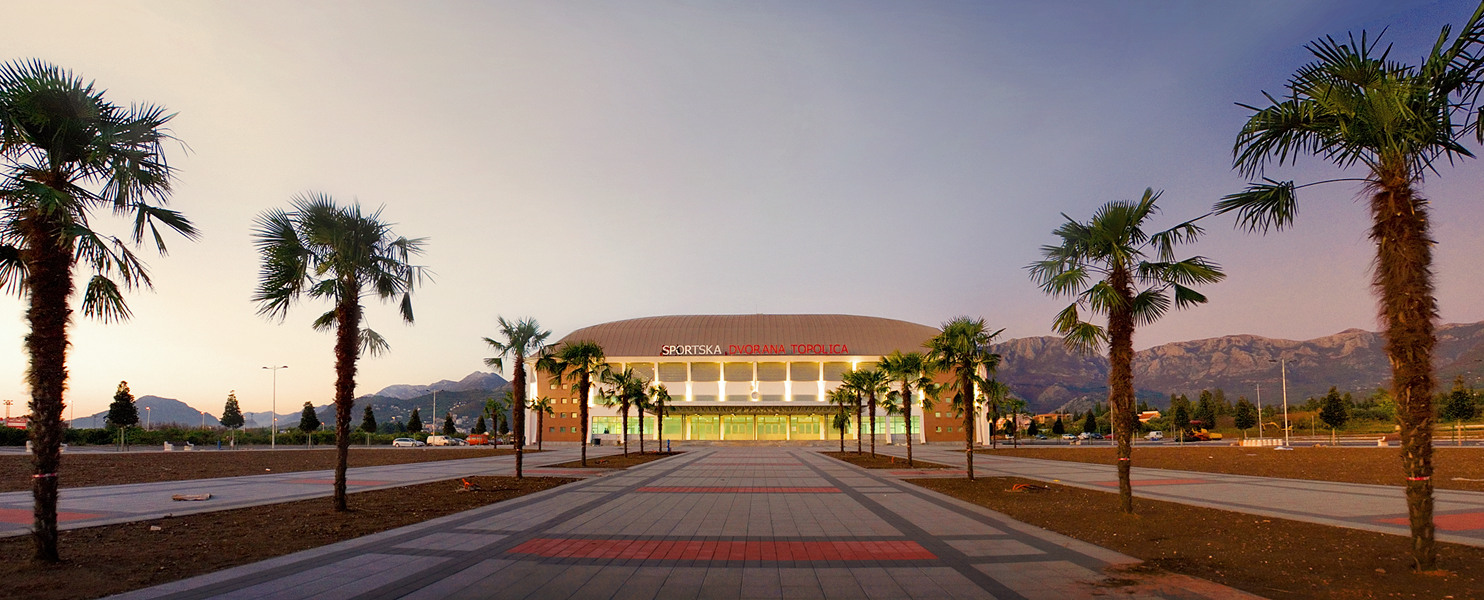
Topolica, current home arena of the club

Mornar plays their home games at the Topolica Sport Hall, which is located in Bar and owned by the PC Sports and Recreation Centre. The arena was opened on 23 November 2009. It has a seating capacity of 3,500.

== Trophies and awards ==
=== Domestic competitions ===
- Montenegrin League
  - Winners (1): 2017–18
  - Runner-up (6): 2010–11, 2015–16, 2016–17, 2018–19, 2020–21, 2021–22
- Montenegrin Cup
  - Runner-up (8): 2010, 2016, 2017, 2018, 2020, 2021, 2022, 2026

=== Regional competitions ===
- Balkan League
  - Runner-up (1): 2015–16

== Season by season ==
Season	Tier	League	Pos.	Montenegrin Cup	Other competitions		European competitions	
2009–10	1	First League	3rd	Runner-up	Balkan League	QF		
2010–11	1	First League	2nd		Balkan League	SF		
2011–12	1	First League	3rd	Semifinalist	Balkan League	QF		
2012–13	1	First League	5th		Balkan League	R1		
2013–14	1	First League	3rd					
2014–15	1	First League	4th	Semifinalist	Balkan League	R2		
2015–16	1	First League	2nd	Runner-up	Balkan League	RU		
2016–17	1	First League	2nd	Runner-up	ABA League	8th	3 Champions League	RS
2017–18	1	First League	1st	Runner-up	ABA First Division	4th	4 FIBA Europe Cup	QF
2018–19	1	First League	2nd	Semifinalist	ABA First Division	9th	2 EuroCup	RS
2019–20	1	First League	— (Note: Canceled due to the coronavirus pandemic)	Runner-up	ABA First Division	5th (Note: On 12 March 2020, the ABA League Assembly temporarily suspended its competitions due to the COVID-19 pandemic. On 27 May 2020, the ABA League Assembly canceled definitely its competitions due to the COVID-19 pandemic.)	3 Champions League	RS
2020–21	1	First League	2nd	Runner-up	ABA First Division	SF	2 EuroCup	T16
2021–22	1	First League	2nd	Runner-up	ABA First Division	9th	3 Champions League	2QR
2022–23	1	First League	3rd	Semifinalist	ABA First Division	12th		
2023–24	1	First League	3rd	—	ABA First Division	13th	3 Champions League	1QR
2023–24	1	First League	3rd	—	ABA First Division	13th	4 FIBA Europe Cup	RS
2024–25	1	First League		Semifinalist	ABA First Division	16th		

Source: Eurobasket.com

== Players ==
=== Current roster ===
Note: Flags indicate national team eligibility at FIBA-sanctioned events. Players may hold other non-FIBA nationalities not displayed.

Mornar Barsko zlato roster
Players
Coaches

Pos.	No.	Nat.	Name	Ht.		Age
SG	44	(Montenegro)	Peković, Novak	1.96 m (6 ft 5 in)	80 kg (176 lb)	23 – 4 June 2003
SG	13	(Serbia)	Kovačević, Marko	1.96 m (6 ft 5 in)	90 kg (198 lb)	27 – 29 July 1999
F	22	(Montenegro)	Vesković, Marko	1.92 m (6 ft 4 in)	90 kg (198 lb)	24 – 9 January 2002
PF	23	(Montenegro)	Miković, Milija	2.05 m (6 ft 9 in)	107 kg (236 lb)	32 – 25 March 1994
SG	41	(Montenegro)	Vranješ, Nemanja (C)	1.87 m (6 ft 2 in)	88 kg (194 lb)	38 – 11 May 1988
PG	47	(Montenegro)	Kovačević, Luka	1.83 m (6 ft 0 in)	75 kg (165 lb)	19 – 8 May 2007
PF	88	(Montenegro)	Radetić, Lazar	2.04 m (6 ft 8 in)	95 kg (209 lb)	23 – 3 July 2003
PG	55	(United States)	Murray Jr., Dwight	1.83 m (6 ft 0 in)	82 kg (181 lb)	26 – 31 January 2000
SF	50	(United States)	Weathers, Marcus	1.96 m (6 ft 5 in)	98 kg (216 lb)	29 – 5 August 1997
G	24	(United States)	Waller, Tay	1.88 m (6 ft 2 in)	88 kg (194 lb)	38 – 11 July 1988
PF	31	(France)	Gavrilović, Alex	2.06 m (6 ft 9 in)	111 kg (245 lb)	34 – 25 November 1991
PF	21	(Serbia)	Bursać, Aleksandar	2.05 m (6 ft 9 in)	100 kg (220 lb)	31 – 19 March 1995
G	33	(Serbia)	Jovanović, Strahinja	1.88 m (6 ft 2 in)	79 kg (174 lb)	30 – 29 August 1996
SG	12	(United States)	Lewis, Trey	1.96 m (6 ft 5 in)	88 kg (194 lb)	34 – 16 February 1992
C	15	(Serbia)	Luković, Uroš	2.13 m (7 ft 0 in)	100 kg (220 lb)	37 – 6 June 1989

Head coach

- (Montenegro) Mihailo Pavićević

Assistant coach(es)

- (Montenegro) Ivan Jelenić
- (Montenegro) Vaso Milović

Legend

- (C) Team captain
- Injured

- Roster
Updated: October 1, 2022

=== Depth chart ===
Pos.	Starting 5	Bench 1	Bench 2	Bench 3
C	Alex Gavrilović	Uroš Luković	Milija Miković
PF	Aleksandar Bursać	Lazar Radetić
SF	Marcus Weathers	Trey Lewis		Marko Vesković
SG	Nemanja Vranješ	Tay Waller	Marko Kovačević	Novak Peković
PG	Dwight Murray Jr.	Strahinja Jovanović	Tavian Dunn-Martin	Luka Kovačević

== Coaches ==
- (Socialist Federal Republic of Yugoslavia) (Serbia and Montenegro) Mihailo Pavićević (1989–1996)
- (Serbia and Montenegro) Đorđije Pavićević (1997–1998)
- (Serbia and Montenegro) (Montenegro) Đorđije Pavićević (2003–2011)
- (Montenegro) Mihailo Pavićević (2011–2013)
- (Montenegro) Đorđije Pavićević (2013–2017)
- (Montenegro) Mihailo Pavićević (2017–present)

== Management ==
Current officeholders are:

- President: Đorđije Pavićević
- Assembly Chairman: Dušan Raičević
- General manager: Lazar Pavićević
- Sporting director: Drago Spičanović

== Notable players ==
Note: Flags indicate national team eligibility at FIBA-sanctioned events. Players may hold other non-FIBA nationalities not displayed.

Criteria

To appear in this section a player must have either:

- Set a club record or won an individual award while at the club
- Played at least one official international match for their national team at any time
- Played at least one official NBA match at any time.

- (Albania) (Kosovo) Samir Shaptahu
- (Bosnia and Herzegovina) Nemanja Gordić
- (Bosnia and Herzegovina) Aleksandar Lazić
- (Georgia (country)) Jacob Pullen
- (Israel) (Trinidad and Tobago) (United States) Khadeen Carrington
- (Montenegro) Nikola Ivanović
- (Montenegro) Vladimir Mihailović
- (Montenegro) Đuro Ostojić
- (Montenegro) Nemanja Vranješ
- (Montenegro) Milija Miković
- (Montenegro) Derek Needham
- (Montenegro) Nemanja Radović
- (Serbia) Ivan Paunić
- (Serbia) Uroš Luković
- (Serbia) Nemanja Krstić
- (Serbia) Đorđe Gagić
- (Serbia) Nikola Rebić
- (United States) Morris Finley
- (United States) Kenny Gabriel
- (United States) Octavius Ellis
- (United States) Lamont Jones
- (United States) (Romania) Fatts Russell
- (United States) Antabia Waller
- (United States) Isaiah Whitehead
