= ABA League JTD =

Croatian company based in Zagreb

- Native name: Jadranska košarkaška asocijacija – ABA liga, jtd
- Company type: General partnership
- Industry: Sport
- Founded: July 6, 2015; 10 years ago in Zagreb, Croatia
- Founders: 12
- Headquarters: Prilaz Ivana Visina 7, Zagreb, Croatia
- Areas served: Bosnia and Herzegovina; Croatia; Montenegro; North Macedonia; Serbia; Slovenia
- Key people: Dragan Bokan; Nebojša Čović; Dubravko Kmetović (CEO)
- Products: ABA League First Division; ABA League Second Division; ABA League Supercup
- Revenue: ▲HRK 11,292,996 (2016); HRK 5,861,698 (2015)
- Operating income: ▼HRK 192,612 (2016); HRK 553,069 (2015)
- Net income: ▼HRK 147,508 (2016); HRK 440,422 (2015)
- Total assets: ▼HRK 3,147,317 (2016); HRK 3,815,028 (2015)
- Total equity: ▲HRK 601,130 (2016); HRK 453,622 (2015)
- Owners: 12
- Website: www.aba-liga.com
- Footnotes / references Source

Adriatic Basketball Association – ABA League, G.P., commonly referred to as the ABA League JTD, is a Croatian company based in Zagreb. It is the general partnership for organizing sports competitions. The company has been running the Adriatic League since the 2015–16 season.

The company runs and operates the three regional-wide men's professional club basketball competitions in South-Eastern Europe, the first-tier ABA League First Division, the second-tier ABA League Second Division, and the ABA League Supercup tournament.

== Founders and shareholders ==
The founders, as well as the shareholders between 2015 and 2020, of the company were 12 basketball clubs, as follows KK Budućnost (Montenegro), KK Cedevita (Croatia), KK Cibona (Croatia), KK Crvena zvezda (Serbia), KK Igokea (Bosnia and Herzegovina), KK Krka Telekom Novo Mesto (Slovenia), KK Mega Vizura (Serbia), KK Metalac Valjevo (Serbia), KK MZT Skopje Aerodrom AD Skopje (North Macedonia), KK Olimpija Ljubljana (Slovenia), KK Partizan (Serbia), and KK Zadar (Croatia).

In the late 2020, the shares owned by Cedevita, Metalac, MZT Skopje Aerodrom and Olimpija Ljubljana were transferred to KK Cedevita Olimpija (Slovenia), KK Koper Primorska (Slovenia), KK Mornar Bar (Montenegro), and KK FMP (Serbia).

=== Current shareholders ===
Following is the list of current shareholders, as of November 2020.

- (Montenegro) Budućnost
- (Slovenia) Cedevita Olimpija
- (Croatia) Cibona
- (Serbia) Crvena zvezda
- (Serbia) FMP
- (Bosnia and Herzegovina) Igokea
- (Slovenia) Koper Primorska
- (Slovenia) Krka
- (Serbia) Mega Basket
- (Montenegro) Mornar
- (Serbia) Partizan
- (Croatia) Zadar

== Management ==
=== Current officeholders ===
The following are the current officeholders of the ABA League:

- (Montenegro) Đorđije Pavićević, President
- (Croatia) David Gunjević, Vice-president
- (Serbia) Goran Ćakić, Vice-president
- (Croatia) Dubravko Kmetović, Director
- (Serbia) Milija Vojinović, Sports Director
- (Croatia) Vanja Vujičić, Technical Secretary
- (Slovenia) Srđan Dožai, Commissioner for Delegating Referees
- (Serbia) Saša Maričić, President of Referees Commission

=== List of officeholders ===
==== Presidents ====
- (Montenegro) Dragan Bokan (2015–16)
- (Croatia) Mladen Veber (2016–17)
- (Serbia) Nebojša Čović (2017–18)
- (Bosnia and Herzegovina) Igor Dodik (2018–19)
- (Croatia) Domagoj Čavlović (2019–20)
- (Serbia) Đorđe Avramović (2021)
- (Montenegro) Đorđije Pavićević (2022–23)

==== General managers ====
- (Croatia) Krešimir Novosel (2015–2019)
- (Croatia) Dubravko Kmetović (2020–present)

==== Sports directors ====
- (Serbia) Žarko Čabarkapa (2015–2019)
- (Serbia) Milija Vojinović (2020–present)

==== Commissioners for delegating referees ====
- (Slovenia) Iztok Rems (2015–2020)
- (Croatia) Srđan Dožai (2020–present)

==== President of referees commission ====
- (Serbia) Branko Jovanović (2015–2020)
- (Serbia) Saša Maričić (2020–present)

==== Secretaries of referees commission ====
- (Croatia) Dragan Medan (2015–2020)

== Current competitions ==
- 2022–23 ABA League First Division
- 2022–23 ABA League Second Division
- 2022–23 Junior ABA League

== Current title holders ==
Competition	Club	Season
First Division	(Serbia) KK Partizan	2022–23
Second Division	(Slovenia) KK Krka	2022–23
Supercup	(Serbia) Partizan NIS	2019
Junior League	(Serbia) Mega Basket U19	2021–22

== See also ==
- Euroleague Basketball
- ULEB
- ABA League Players Union
