= Đorđije Pavićević =

Montenegrin basketball coach

Mornar Bar
- Position: President
- League: ABA League; Montenegrin League

Personal information
- Born: 17 May 1963 (age 63) Bar, PR Montenegro, FPR Yugoslavia
- Listed height: 1.87 m (6 ft 2 in)
- Coaching career: 1997–2017

Career history

Coaching
- 1997–1998: Mornar
- 2000–2001: Primorka Bar
- 2003–2011: Mornar
- 2011–2013: Mornar (assistant)
- 2013–2017: Mornar
- 2017–2019: Mornar (assistant)

Đorđije Pavićević (Serbian Cyrillic: Ђорђије Павићевић; born May 17, 1963) is a Montenegrin professional basketball coach and executive and former player. He currently works as the president for Mornar of the Montenegrin Basketball League and the ABA League.

== Coaching career ==
Pavićević spent almost an entire coaching career with his hometown team Mornar. He coached Mornar for 1997–98 season in Yugoslav League. Later he joined them in 2003. He was a head coach from 2003 to 2011 and from 2013 to 2017. During a second stint with Mornar, he led the team in the Serbia & Montenegro League in two seasons (2004–05 and 2005–06). Prior to the 2017–18 season, Pavićević left head coach position while his older brother Mihailo Pavićević became the head coach for Mornar.

== Executive career ==
In 2019, Pavićević became the president of the Mornar Basketball Club.

On 15 July 2019, Pavićević was named a vice-president of the Adriatic Basketball Association.

== Personal life ==
His brother is Mihailo Pavićević, a basketball coach and current head coach of Mornar.
