= Antabia Waller =

American basketball player

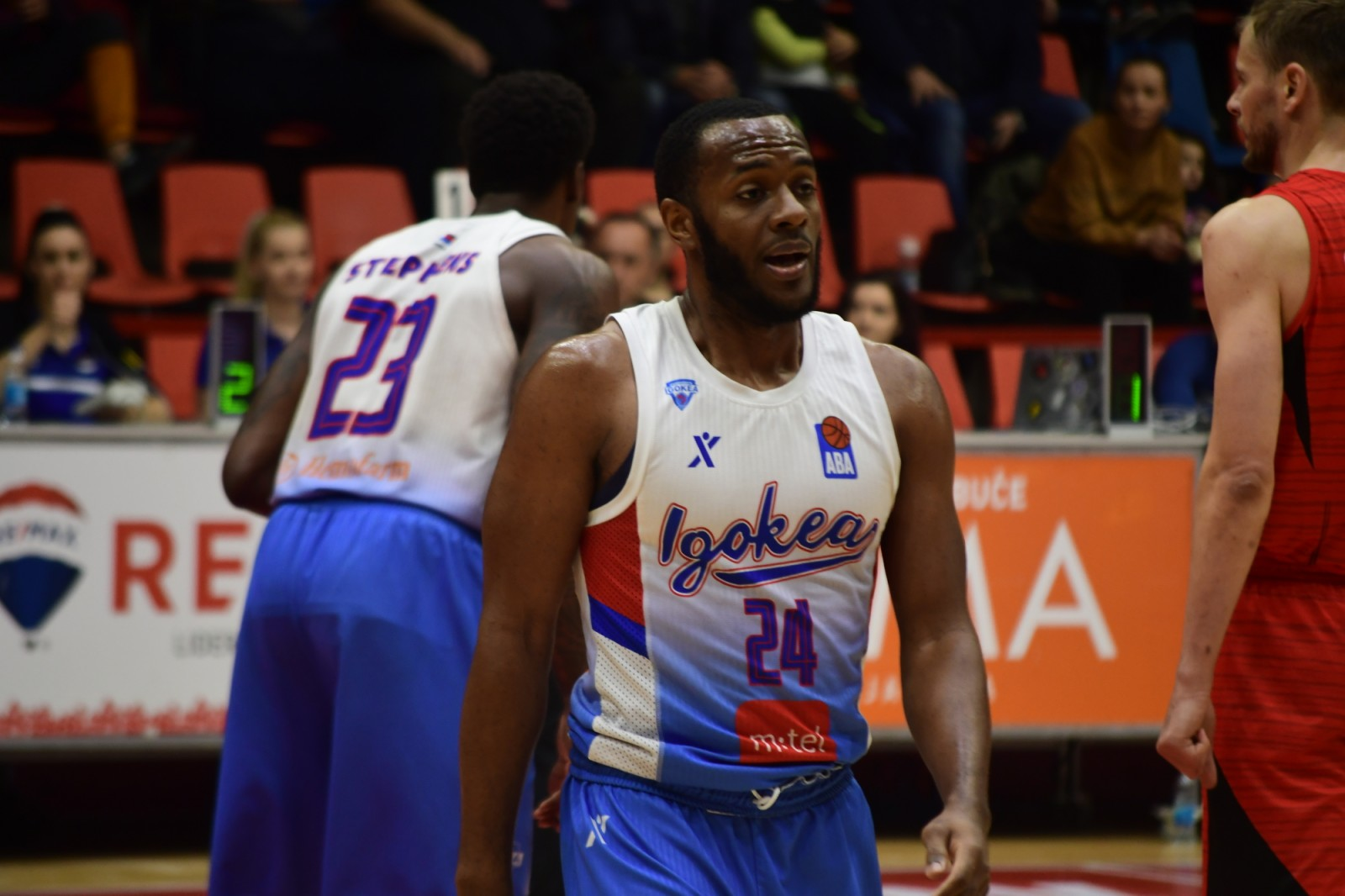
- Waller with Igokea

Personal information
- Born: July 11, 1988 (age 38) Manchester, Georgia
- Listed height: 6 ft 2 in (1.88 m)
- Listed weight: 193 lb (88 kg)

Career information
- High school: Manchester (Manchester, Georgia)
- College: Northwest Florida State (2006–2008); Auburn (2008–2010)
- NBA draft: 2010: undrafted
- Playing career: 2010–present
- Position: Point guard / shooting guard

Career history
- 2010–2011: Oyak Renault
- 2011–2012: Gaziantep
- 2012–2013: Vestelspor Manisa
- 2013–2014: Sigal Prishtina
- 2015–2016: Bashkimi Prizren
- 2016–2017: Mornar Bar
- 2017–2018: Pallacanestro Varese
- 2018–2020: Mornar Bar
- 2020–2023: Igokea
- 2023–2024: Mornar Bar
- 2024–2025: Kumanovo

Career highlights
- 2× Bosnian League champion (2022, 2023); 3× Bosnian Cup winner (2021–2023)

Antabia "Tay" Waller (born July 11, 1988) is an American professional basketball player who last played for Kumanovo of the Macedonian First League.
