= Mihailo Pavićević =

Montenegrin basketball player and coach

Mornar Bar
- Title: Head coach
- League: ABA League; Montenegrin League

Personal information
- Born: 15 March 1958 (age 68) Bar, PR Montenegro, Yugoslavia
- Listed height: 1.87 m (6 ft 2 in)

Career information
- NBA draft: 1980: undrafted
- Playing career: 1976–1989
- Position: Guard
- Coaching career: 1989–present

Career history

Playing
- 1976–1979: Mornar
- 1979–1981: Budućnost
- 1981–1988: Mornar
- 1988–1989: Budućnost
- 1989: Omonia Nicosia

Coaching
- 1989–1996: Mornar
- 1996–1997: Crvena zvezda (assistant)
- 1997, 1998: Crvena zvezda
- 2000–2009: Espoon Honka
- 2011–2013: Mornar
- 2013–2015: Liaoning Flying Leopards
- 2017–present: Mornar

Career highlights
- As head coach: Montenegrin League champion (2018); YUBA League champion (1998); 5× Finnish League champion (2001–2003, 2007, 2008); 2× Finnish Cup winner (2001, 2009); Finnish League Coach of the Year (2003)

Mihailo Pavićević (Serbian Cyrillic: Михаило Павићевић; born March 15, 1958) is a Montenegrin professional basketball coach and former player. He currently works as the head coach for Mornar of the Montenegrin Basketball League and the ABA League.

== Playing career ==
Pavićević has spent most of his playing career in his native Bar playing for the local team Mornar. On two occasions he played for Budućnost in Podgorica, and he ended his playing career in Omonia Nicosia.

== Coaching career ==
Pavićević started coaching in 1989 in Mornar, before moving to the Crvena zvezda in 1996. With the Zvezda he won the YUBA League championship in the 1997–98 season.

Between 2000 and 2009, Pavićević led Espoon Honka and won five Finnish championships and two Finnish Cups. He managed to promote several important Finnish players, such as Petteri Koponen, Sasu Salin, Kimmo Muurinen, and others.

In 2013, Pavićević became the coach of the Chinese club Liaoning Flying Leopards, with whom he had managed to qualify for the playoff finals in the 2014–15 season where they lost from the Beijing Ducks.

Prior to the 2017–18 season, Pavićević became the head coach for Mornar.

=== National team coaching career ===
Between 2011 and 2014, Pavićević was the head coach of the Montenegro national under-20 team.

== Personal life ==
His brother is Đorđije Pavićević, a basketball coach and former head coach of Mornar.

His daughter Tamara Pavićević is a fashion blogger.

== Career achievements ==
As head coach

- Montenegrin League champion: 1 (with Mornar Bar: 2017–18)
- YUBA League champion: 1 (with Crvena zvezda: 1997–98)
- Finnish League champion: 5 (with Espoon Honka: 2000–01, 2001–02, 2002–03, 2006–07, 2007–08)
- Finnish Cup winner: 2 (with Espoon Honka: 2000–01, 2008–09)

Individual

- Finnish League Coach of the Year – 2003

== See also ==
- List of KK Crvena zvezda head coaches
