= Simon Petrov =

Slovenian basketball player and coach

Sichuan Blue Whales
- Title: Head coach
- League: CBA

Personal information
- Born: 27 January 1976 (age 50) Novo Mesto, SR Slovenia, SFR Yugoslavia
- Listed height: 1.89 m (6 ft 2 in)
- Listed weight: 86 kg (190 lb)

Career information
- Playing career: 1995–2012
- Position: Guard
- Number: 7, 10, 22
- Coaching career: 2013–present

Career history

Playing
- 1995–2001: Krka
- 2001–2003: ASVEL Villeurbanne
- 2003–2004: Union Olimpija
- 2004–2005: Geoplin Slovan
- 2005–2006: AEL Limassol
- 2006: Bandırma Banvit
- 2006–2007: Olympias Patras
- 2007: Air Avellino
- 2008: Geoplin
- 2008–2012: Krka

Coaching
- 2012–2013: Krka (assistant)
- 2013–2014: Slovan Bratislava
- 2015–2017: Krka U19
- 2017–2019: Krka
- 2019–2022: Pécs Panthers
- 2022–2024: Oroszlány Lions
- 2024–2026: Jiangsu Dragons (assistant)
- 2026: Sichuan Blue Whales (assistant)
- 2026–present: Sichuan Blue Whales

Career highlights
- As player: EuroChallenge (2011); 5× Slovenian League (2000, 2004, 2010–2012); French League (2002); As head coach: ABA League Second Division (2018)

Simon Petrov (born 27 January 1976) is a Slovenian professional basketball coach and former player. He currently serves as the head coach for the Sichuan Blue Whales of the Chinese Basketball Association (CBA).

== International career ==
He was a member of the Slovenian under-22 national team and competed with the senior team at the 2003 European Championship.
