= Matic Rebec =

Slovenian basketball player

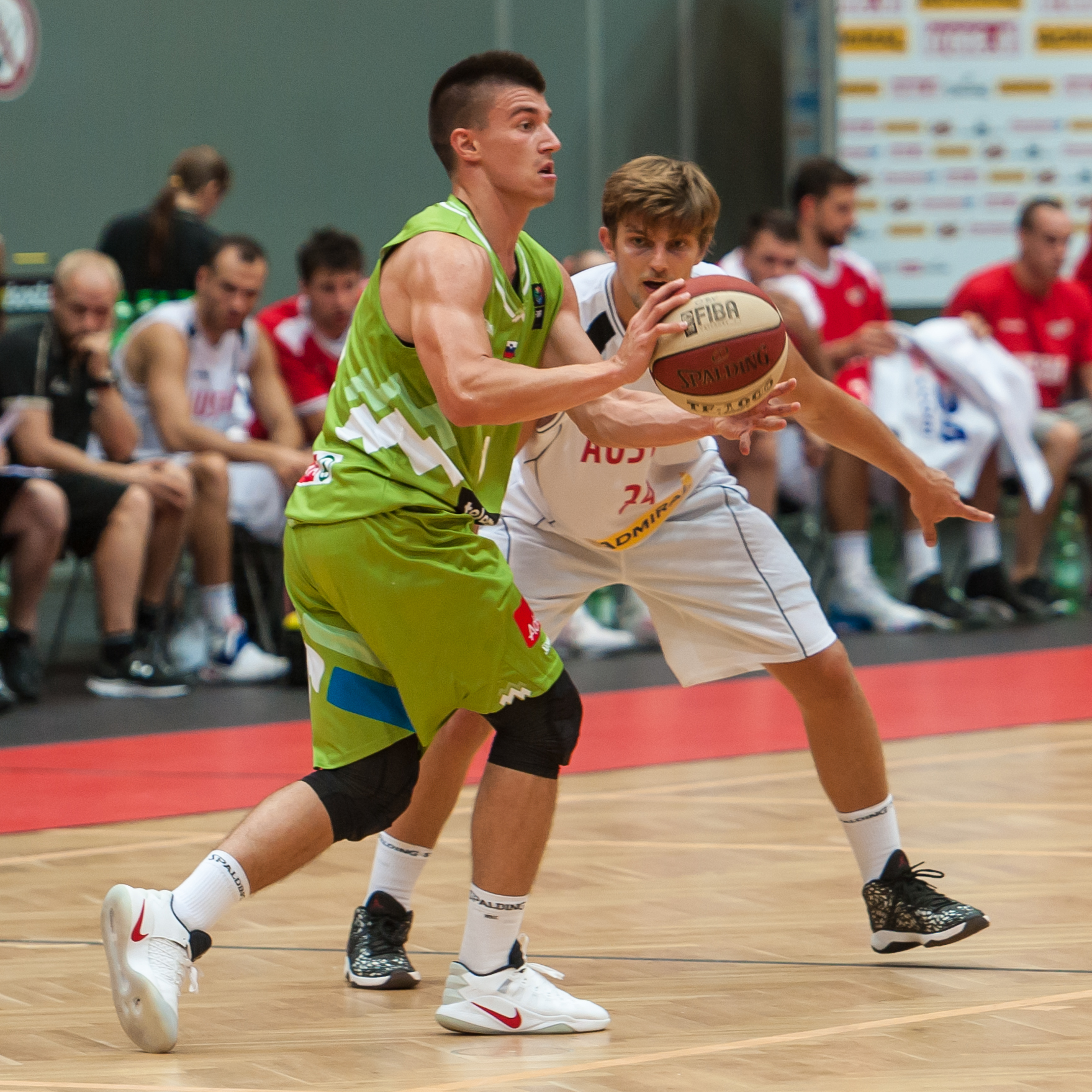
- Rebec with Slovenia in 2016

No. 00 – Split
- Position: Point guard
- League: Premijer liga FIBA Europe Cup

Personal information
- Born: January 24, 1995 (age 31) Postojna, Slovenia
- Listed height: 1.80 m (5 ft 11 in)
- Listed weight: 77 kg (170 lb)

Career information
- NBA draft: 2017: undrafted
- Playing career: 2011–present

Career history
- 2011–2015: Helios
- 2015: Rogaška
- 2015–2017: Krka
- 2017: Enisey
- 2018: Primorska
- 2018–2019: FMP
- 2019: Gipuzkoa
- 2019–2020: Cibona
- 2020: Rasta Vechta
- 2020–2021: Rouen Métropole Basket
- 2021: Basket Ravenna
- 2021: Chieti Basket 1974
- 2021–2022: Agribertocchi Orzinuovi
- 2022–2023: Cedevita Olimpija
- 2023: Kazma
- 2023–2024: FMP
- 2024: Nanjing Monkey Kings
- 2025: Nizhny Novgorod
- 2025: Halcones de Xalapa
- 2025–2026: Studentski centar
- 2026–present: Split

Career highlights
- Slovenian League champion (2023); 3× Slovenian Cup winner (2016, 2018, 2023); Slovenian Cup MVP (2018); ABA League assists leader (2019)
Medals
Men's basketball
Representing Slovenia
EuroBasket
Gold medal – first place	2017 Finland–Israel–Romania–Turkey

Matic Rebec (born January 24, 1995) is a Slovenian professional basketball player for Split of the Croatian Premijer liga and the ABA League. Standing at 180 cm (5 ft 11 in), he plays at the point guard position.

== Professional career ==
On September 26, 2018, Rebec signed with the FMP of the ABA League. On February 23, 2019, he signed with the Gipuzkoa of the Liga ACB,.

On September 17, 2019, Rebec signed with the Cibona of the ABA League. On May 18, 2020, he signed with the Rasta Vechta of the Basketball Bundesliga.

On August 19, 2020, Rebec signed with the Rouen Métropole Basket of the LNB Pro B. On February 5, 2021, he signed with the Basket Ravenna of the Serie A2.

On September 4, 2021, Rebec joined the Limoges CSP of the LNB Pro A. On September 28, Limoges CSP parted ways with Rebec. On September 30, he signed with the Chieti Basket 1974 of the Serie A2. On December 22, he signed with the Agribertocchi Orzinuovi of the Serie A2.

On October 15, 2022, Rebec signed a one month contract with the Cedevita Olimpija of the ABA League. In December 2022, he a contract signed with the Cedevita Olimpija for the remainder of the season.

On December 27, 2023, after playing for the Kazma, Rebec signed with the FMP of the ABA League.

On May 29, 2024, Rebec re-signed with the FMP. On December 23, FMP parted ways with Rebec. On January 9, 2025, he signed with the Nanjing Monkey Kings of the Chinese Basketball Association (CBA). On 8 February 2025, he signed with the Nizhny Novgorod of the VTB United League.

On September 8, 2026, Rebec signed a short-term contract with BC Tauragė, a team recently promoted to the Lithuanian Basketball League (LKL). However, the club waived him just hours later following a severe public backlash over his recent playing stint in Russia, issuing a public apology.

On September 20, 2026, Rebec signed with Split of the Croatian League and the FIBA Europe Cup.
