= KK Igokea =

Basketball club in Laktaši, Bosnia and Herzegovina

Igokea m:tel
- Nickname: Igosi
- Leagues: Bosnian League; ABA League; Champions League
- Founded: 23 July 1973; 53 years ago
- History: KK Potkozarje (1973–1997); KK Igokea (1997–present)
- Arena: Laktaši Sports Hall
- Capacity: 3,050
- Location: Laktaši, Republika Srpska, Bosnia and Herzegovina
- Team colors: Midnight blue, lake blue, white
- President: Boris Spasojević
- General manager: Igor Dodik
- Team manager: Siniša Kovačević
- Head coach: Nenad Stefanović
- Team captain: Dragan Milosavljević
- Championships: 11 National Championship; 11 National Cups
- Retired numbers: 1 (6)
- Website: igokea.rs
Home	Away

Košarkaški klub Igokea (Serbian Cyrillic: Кошаркашки клуб Игокеа), commonly referred to as KK Igokea or as Igokea m:tel due to sponsorship reasons, is a Bosnian professional basketball club based in Aleksandrovac, near Laktaši, Republika Srpska, Bosnia and Herzegovina. The club plays in the Bosnian League, the ABA League, and the FIBA Champions League. The club is a founding member and shareholder of the Adriatic Basketball Association.

== History ==
Even though they have become well known to the broader basketball public in the territory of the former Yugoslavia only several years ago, when they joined the regional competition called the Adriatic League, Igokea is a club with a long-lasting tradition. Its beginnings go back into 23 July 1973, when KK Potkozarje was established in Aleksandrovac by a group of enthusiasts that set themselves the main goal to introduce basketball to local youth and teach them the basics. In the second half of the 1990s, the club was renamed to Igokea and that's when the club's main emphasis was put on its youth categories and got another dimension and adopted the highest ambitions at the senior level. Igokea's first trophy came in 2001 when the club from Aleksandrovac conquered the entire competition in Bosnia and Herzegovina and became champion. Six years later, it won its first national cup trophy. By now the club has won six championship and five cup trophies. In the 2010–11 season, Igokea participated in the ABA League for the first time and in 2013 it reached the regional league's final four tournaments, securing themselves also a spot in the Eurocup and that's when it entered the biggest international stage.

=== 2012–13 ABA League controversy ===
At the beginning of the 2012–13 ABA League season, the ABA League Board announced that starting this season the only way to qualify for the European Club Competitions under ULEB, will be through Adriatic League and not the national championships of each ABA country member. ABA League Board also informed clubs and the public that the winner of the regular season will directly qualify for the Euroleague Group Phase in the 2013–14 season and that the second ABA team in Euroleague will be the Final Four winner. If the same team wins the regular season and the Final Four, then the second-placed team from the regular season will go to Euroleague. The third-placed team from the regular season would enter the Qualification for the 2013–14 Euroleague. In February 2013, when it became clear that Igokea will win the regular season, Euroleague Basketball clarified the situation of the Adriatic League spots saying the three first teams in the Final Four will qualify. Due to the different interpretations of both associations, Euroleague and Liga ABA negotiated a solution to be applied only for the 2012–13 season. Finally, both organizations agreed that if the team is in the first positions after the Regular Season meets all of the B-licence minimum requirements, will qualify to Euroleague. In this case, KK Igokea doesn't meet the required criteria, so Euroleague Basketball applied the 2012–13 Euroleague Bylaws by which the 2013 ABA Final Four champion and the runner-up will take the first two Adriatic positions in this order, while the next highest regular-season team will take the final Adriatic position.

=== 2013–14 European club competitions ===
On 25 June 2013, Igokea's executive board announced that the club would not compete in the 2013–14 Euroleague Qualifying rounds because their home arena did not meet the standards for the Euroleague B license (mainly because of the capacity). Instead, the club competed in the 2013–14 EuroCup.

== Sponsorship naming ==
KK Igokea has had several names through the years due to its sponsorship:

- Igokea Partizan: 2007–2009
- Igokea m:tel: 2021–present

== Home arena ==
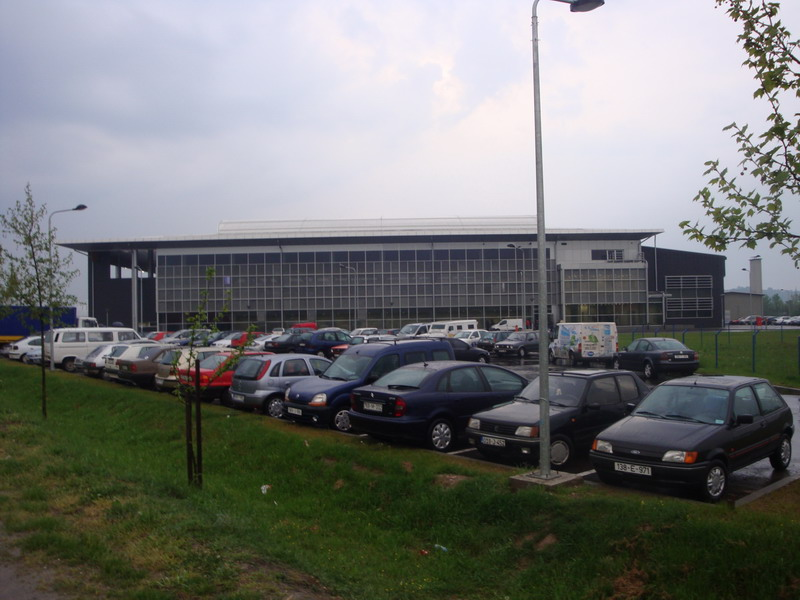
Laktaši Sports Hall

Igokea plays its home games at the Laktaši Sports Hall (Serbian Cyrillic: Хала спортова у Лакташима). The hall is located in Laktaši. The small hall has a seating capacity of 3,050 seats.

== Players ==
=== Retired numbers ===
KK Igokea retired numbers
No.	Player	Position	Tenure	Date
6	Milan Dozet	SF	2010–2014	February 7, 2016

=== Current roster ===
Note: Flags indicate national team eligibility at FIBA-sanctioned events. Players may hold other non-FIBA nationalities not displayed.

Igokea roster
Players
Coaches

Pos.	No.	Nat.	Name	Ht.	Wt.	Age
G/F	1	(Serbia)	Stefanović, Lazar	2.01 m (6 ft 7 in)	82 kg (181 lb)	24 – 27 April 2002
C	3	(United Kingdom)	Armotrading, Joel	2.08 m (6 ft 10 in)	102 kg (225 lb)	24 – 29 April 2002
F/C	4	(Serbia)	Gavrilović, Strahinja	2.06 m (6 ft 9 in)	104 kg (229 lb)	33 – 5 April 1993
PG	5	(Bosnia and Herzegovina)	Duvnjak, Faruk	1.90 m (6 ft 3 in)	78 kg (172 lb)	20 – 14 July 2006
SG	7	(Serbia)	Paunović, Uroš	1.93 m (6 ft 4 in)	86 kg (190 lb)	23 – 15 March 2003
SF	8	(Bosnia and Herzegovina)	Lazić, Aleksandar	2.01 m (6 ft 7 in)	96 kg (212 lb)	30 – 10 June 1996
SF	9	(Bosnia and Herzegovina)	Delalić, Haris	2.02 m (6 ft 8 in)	100 kg (220 lb)	32 – 24 April 1994
F/C	12	(Bosnia and Herzegovina) (Croatia)	Antunović, Sandro	2.04 m (6 ft 8 in)	107 kg (236 lb)	28 – 7 May 1998
PG	13	(United States)	Penn, Roman	1.83 m (6 ft 0 in)	84 kg (185 lb)	29 – 1 September 1997
PF	14	(Serbia)	Kovačević, Petar	2.03 m (6 ft 8 in)	102 kg (225 lb)	24 – 30 October 2002
C	15	(Bosnia and Herzegovina)	Topolović, Đorđe	2.08 m (6 ft 10 in)	84 kg (185 lb)	25 – 7 July 2001
G/F	21	(Serbia)	Milosavljević, Dragan (C)	1.98 m (6 ft 6 in)	91 kg (201 lb)	37 – 11 May 1989
SG	24	(Bosnia and Herzegovina) (Croatia)	Hrštić, Armin	1.96 m (6 ft 5 in)	95 kg (209 lb)	26 – 30 May 2000
PG	27	(Serbia)	Vujičić, Milutin	1.92 m (6 ft 4 in)	90 kg (198 lb)	24 – 8 March 2002
SG	55	(Bosnia and Herzegovina) (Australia)	Manojlović, Nikola	1.96 m (6 ft 5 in)	95 kg (209 lb)	24 – 14 February 2002

Head coach

- (Serbia) Nenad Stefanović

Assistant coach(es)

- (Serbia) Marko Cvetković
- (Bosnia and Herzegovina) Zoran Petković
- (Bosnia and Herzegovina) Milutin Latinčić
- (Serbia) Vasilj Đurić

Team manager

- (Bosnia and Herzegovina) (Serbia) Siniša Kovačević

Legend

- (C) Team captain
- Injured

- Roster
- Transactions
Updated: November 13, 2026

=== Depth chart ===
Pos.	Starting 5	Bench 1	Bench 2	Bench 3
C	Joel Armotrading	Strahinja Gavrilović	Đorđe Topolović
PF	Sandro Antunović	Petar Kovačević		Uroš Paunović
SF	Aleksandar Lazić	Haris Delalić		Dragan Milosavljević
SG	Lazar Stefanović	Nikola Manojlović		Armin Hrštić
PG	Roman Penn	Milutin Vujičić	Faruk Duvnjak

== Head coaches ==
- (Federal Republic of Yugoslavia) Jovica Antonić (2000–2001)
- (Bosnia and Herzegovina) Drago Karalić (2001)
- (Serbia) Dragan Kostić (2006–2007)
- (Serbia) Željko Lukajić (2007)
- (Montenegro) Miodrag Kadija (2007)
- (Serbia) Zoran Sretenović (2007–2008)
- (Bosnia and Herzegovina) Drago Karalić (2008)
- (Serbia) Predrag Badnjarević (2008)
- (Bosnia and Herzegovina) Dragan Bajić (2008)
- (Bosnia and Herzegovina) Drago Karalić (2009–2010)
- (Serbia) Slobodan Klipa (2010–2011)
- (Bosnia and Herzegovina) Dragan Bajić (2011–2013)
- (Bosnia and Herzegovina) Milutin Latinčić (2013–2014)
- (Serbia) Vladimir Jovanović (2014)
- (Serbia) Željko Lukajić (2014–2015)
- (Bosnia and Herzegovina) Dragan Bajić (2015–2018)
- (Bosnia and Herzegovina) Žarko Milaković (2018)
- (Serbia) Nenad Trajković (2018)
- (Bosnia and Herzegovina) Žarko Milaković (2018)
- (Serbia) Dragan Nikolić (2018–2019)
- (Serbia) Aleksandar Trifunović (2019)
- (Bosnia and Herzegovina) Dragan Bajić (2019–2023)
- (Serbia) Vladimir Jovanović (2023–2024)
- (Serbia) Nenad Stefanović (2024–present)

== Honours ==
=== Domestic competitions ===
- Bosnian League
  - Winners (11): 2000–01, 2012–13, 2013–14, 2014–15, 2015–16, 2016–17, 2019–20, 2021–22, 2022–23, 2023–24, 2024–25
- Bosnian Cup
  - Winners (11): 2007, 2013, 2015, 2016, 2017, 2018, 2019, 2021, 2022, 2023, 2025

=== Entity competitions ===
- Republika Srpska First League (second tier)
  - Winners (2): 1999–00, 2000–01
- Republika Srpska Cup
  - Winners (11): 1999–00, 2000–01, N/A, 2007–08, 2009–10, 2010–11, 2011–12, 2012–13, 2013–14, 2014–15, 2020–21

== International record ==
Season	Achievement	Notes
EuroCup
2013–14	Regular season	6th in Group E with Khimki, Hapoel Jerusalem, Pınar Karşıyaka, Lukoil Academic, and CSU Asesoft
Champions League
2020–21	Playoffs	3rd in Group J with Lenovo Tenerife, San Pablo Burgos, and VEF Rīga
2016–17	Second round	Eliminated by Mornar, 71–69 and 60–83
FIBA Saporta Cup
2001–02	Regular season	5th in Group D with Slovakofarma Pezinok, Iraklis, FMP, Split CO, and Keravnos Keo
FIBA Korać Cup
2000–01	Round of 64	Eliminated by Fenerbahçe, 78–75 and 65–73

== Management ==
Current officeholders are:

- President: (Bosnia and Herzegovina) Boris Spasojević
- General manager: (Bosnia and Herzegovina) Igor Dodik
- Sports director: (Serbia) Vuk Radivojević
- Team manager: (Bosnia and Herzegovina) Siniša Kovačević

== Youth selections ==
Student Igokea is the youth team of KK Igokea, based in Banja Luka, Bosnia and Herzegovina. The team serves as a developmental squad for the main club, providing young players with the opportunity to hone their skills and compete at a high level.

Under-16 and younger play in the regional youth league of Republika Srpska, but the oldest selection plays in First League of Republika Srpska (basketball)

In 2023, Igokea won the Youth Basketball Champions League . They performed strongly in the group stage and knockout rounds, ultimately beating Tofaş S.K. in the finals and securing the first ever Youth Basketball Champions League trophy
