= Dragan Nikolić (basketball) =

Serbian basketball coach (born 1972)

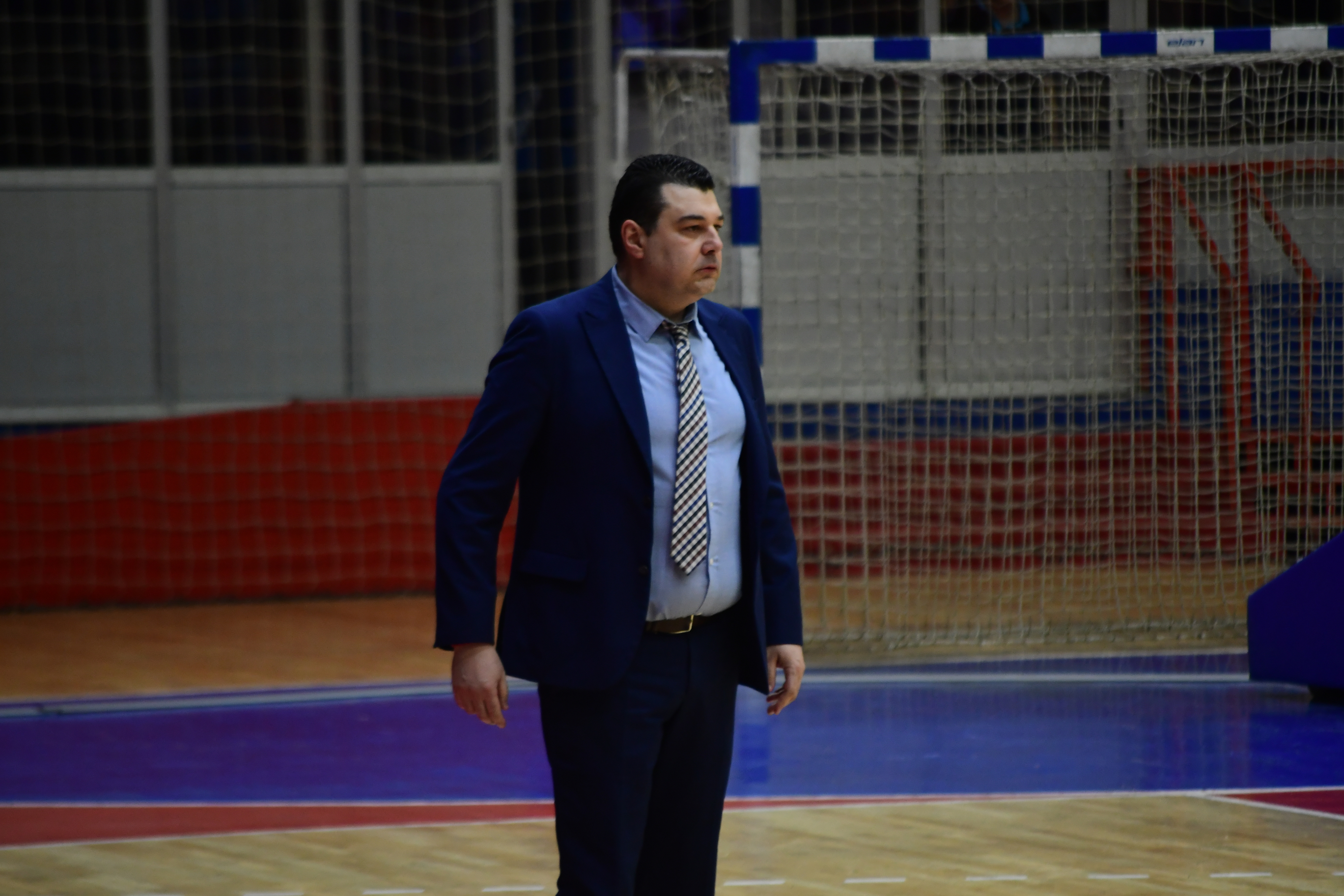
- Nikolić coaching Borac Banja Luka in 2022

Personal information
- Born: February 20, 1972 (age 54) Belgrade, SR Serbia, Yugoslavia
- Position: Head coach
- Coaching career: 1999–present

Career history

Coaching
- 1999–2000: ŽKK Profitnes Ohrid
- 2001–2002: ŽKK Bijelina
- 2002–2003: ŽKK Profitnes Ohrid
- 2003–2005: Ušće
- 2005–2006: Mladost Zemun
- 2006–2007: Proleter Naftagas
- 2007–2009: Tamiš
- 2009–2012: BKK Radnički
- 2012–2013: Metalac Valjevo
- 2014–2016: Mladost Zemun
- 2016–2017: Karpoš Sokoli
- 2017–2018: AZS Koszalin
- 2018–2019: Igokea
- 2020–2022: Borac Banja Luka
- 2022–2023: MZT Skopje
- 2023–2024: Sutjeska
- 2024: Dinamo București

Career highlights
- 3× Serbian Second League champion (2008, 2011, 2015); Bosnian Cup winner (2019); 2× Macedonian Cup winner (2017), (2023); Serbian League Cup winner (2013)

Dragan "Gagi" Nikolić (Serbian Cyrillic: Драган "Гаги" Николић; born February 20, 1972) is a Serbian professional basketball coach.

== Coaching career ==
Nikolić coached Ušće, Mladost Zemun, Metalac Valjevo Tamiš, Proleter Zrenjanin, BKK Radnički, and Karpoš Sokoli.

On December 24, 2018, Nikolić was named a head coach of the Bosnian team Igokea. He left Igokea in June 2019.

In December 2020, Borac Banja Luka hired Nikolić as the new head coach. In July 2021, he signed one-year contract extension with Borac. He left Borac in April 2022.
