= 2017–18 Prva A liga =

12th season of the Montenegrin Basketball League

Prva A Liga
- Teams: 11

Finals
- Champions: Mornar (1st title)
- Runners-up: Budućnost
- Semifinalists: Lovćen 1947; Sutjeska

The 2017–18 Prva A Liga, known as Erste košarkaške lige for sponsorship reasons, is the 12th season of the Montenegrin Basketball League, the top tier basketball league on Montenegro. Budućnost VOLI, who won all the league editions until this season, lost the title to Mornar.

== Competition format ==
Nine of the eleven teams that play the league join the regular season and play a two-round robin competition where the six first qualified teams join the Super Liga with the two 2017–18 ABA League teams (Budućnost Voli and Mornar). The last qualified team would play a relegation playoff against the second qualified of the Prva B.

== Regular season ==
Pos	Team	Pld	W	L	PF	PA	PD	Pts	Qualification
1	Ulcinj	16	14	2	1412	1166	+246	30	Qualification to the Super Liga
2	Lovćen 1947	16	14	2	1352	1119	+233	30	Qualification to the Super Liga
3	Sutjeska	16	11	5	1343	1114	+229	27	Qualification to the Super Liga
4	Teodo Tivat	16	11	5	1397	1174	+223	27	Qualification to the Super Liga
5	Ibar Rožaje	16	7	9	1224	1225	−1	23	
6	Danilovgrad	16	5	11	1102	1220	−118	21	
7	Jedinstvo	16	5	11	1243	1407	−164	21	
8	Primorje	16	3	13	1113	1490	−377	19	
9	Studenski centar (O)	16	2	14	1091	1362	−271	18	Qualification to the relegation playoffs

Source: KSCG, Flashscore.com
(O) Play-off winners

== Super Liga ==
Pos	Team	Pld	W	L	PF	PA	PD	Pts	Qualification
1	Budućnost VOLI	10	9	1	860	705	+155	19	Qualification to the playoffs
2	Mornar	10	8	2	860	739	+121	18	Qualification to the playoffs
3	Sutjeska	10	7	3	794	752	+42	17	Qualification to the playoffs
4	Lovćen 1947	10	4	6	798	873	−75	14	Qualification to the playoffs
5	Teodo Tivat	10	2	8	689	797	−108	12	
6	Ulcinj	10	0	10	745	880	−135	10	

Source: KSCG, Flashscore.com

=== Playoffs ===
Semi-finals
Budućnost VOLI	93	78
Lovćen 1947	60	75
Mornar	97	100
Sutjeska	73	78

Final
Budućnost VOLI	77	85	88	63
Mornar	84	93	87	75

== Relegation playoffs ==
Team 1	Agg.	Team 2	1st leg	2nd leg
Studenski centar	175–173	Gusinje	85–88	90–85
