= 2018 ABA League Playoffs =

The 2018 ABA League Playoffs is the play-off tournament that decides the winner of the 2017–18 ABA League First Division season. The playoffs started on March 18, 2018 and ended on April 14, 2018. The winner of the play-offs qualifies for the 2018–19 EuroLeague.

== Qualified teams ==
Round	Team	Ref.
1st	(Montenegro) Budućnost VOLI	
2nd	(Serbia) Crvena zvezda mts	
3rd	(Croatia) Cedevita	
4th	(Montenegro) Mornar	

== Bracket ==
Semifinals
18 March–2 April
(Serbia) Crvena zvezda mts	2
(Montenegro) Mornar	1
18 March–2 April
(Montenegro) Budućnost VOLI	2
(Croatia) Cedevita	1

Final
9–14 April
(Serbia) Crvena zvezda mts	1
(Montenegro) Budućnost VOLI	3

== Semifinals ==
Team 1	Series	Team 2	Game 1	Game 2	Game 3
Crvena zvezda mts (Serbia)	2–1	(Montenegro) Mornar	91–63	84–88	88–69
Budućnost VOLI (Montenegro)	2–1	(Croatia) Cedevita	84–83	75–82	72–57

=== 1st leg ===
18 March 2018	Crvena zvezda mts (Serbia)	91–63 (Series: 1–0)	(Montenegro) Mornar	Belgrade
19:00	Scoring by quarter: 22–14, 19–8, 23–27, 27–14
	Pts: Feldeine 23; Rebs: Omić 8 Asts: Ennis 6 PIR: Feldeine 25	Boxscore	Pts: Needham 16; Rebs: Vujošević 7 Asts: Needham, Raley-Ross 4 PIR: Pavić 16	Arena: Aleksandar Nikolić Hall; Attendance: 7,237; Referees: (Slovenia) Saša Pukl (Croatia) Tomislav Hordov (Slovenia) Milan Nedović

Starters:			Pts	Reb	Ast
G	22	(Montenegro) Taylor Rochestie	10	0	4
G/F	7	(Serbia) Dejan Davidovac	2	5	3
G/F	10	(Serbia) Branko Lazić	3	2	0
F/C	51	(Montenegro) Milko Bjelica	17	3	2
F/C	26	(France) Mathias Lessort	2	3	1
Reserves:					
SF	4	(Serbia) Marko Kešelj	8	1	0
F/C	12	(North Macedonia) Pero Antić	5	2	1
G/F	13	(Serbia) Ognjen Dobrić	7	5	2
SG	14	(Dominican Republic) James Feldeine	23	1	4
F/C	16	(Serbia) Stefan Janković	2	2	1
C	23	(Slovenia) Alen Omić	10	8	1
PG	31	(Jamaica) Dylan Ennis	2	5	6
Head coach:
(Serbia) Dušan Alimpijević

Crvena zvezda	Mornar

Starters:			Pts	Reb	Ast
PG	5	(Montenegro) Derek Needham	16	4	4
SG	44	(Montenegro) Boris Bakić	2	2	2
SG	41	(Montenegro) Nemanja Vranješ	4	0	1
PF	4	(Serbia) Strahinja Mićović	6	4	0
C	17	(Montenegro) Radoje Vujošević	10	7	0
Reserves:					
SG	1	(Montenegro) Lazar Pavićević	DNP		
SG	3	(Montenegro) Marko Čalić	1	1	0
PG	10	(Montenegro) Marko Mijović	DNP		
PF	14	(Montenegro) Vukota Pavić	12	6	0
SG	22	(Montenegro) Marko Mugoša	0	0	0
PG	24	(United States) Brandis Raley-Ross	12	2	4
Head coach:
(Montenegro) Mihailo Pavićević

18 March 2018	Budućnost VOLI (Montenegro)	84–83 (Series: 1–0)	(Croatia) Cedevita	Podgorica
21:00	Scoring by quarter: 24–23, 15–11, 22–30, 23–19
	Pts: Gordić 23; Rebs: Z. Nikolić 6 Asts: Gordić 5 PIR: Gordić 30	Boxscore	Pts: Cherry 24; Rebs: Musa 6 Asts: Nichols 4 PIR: Cherry 22	Arena: Morača Sports Center; Attendance: 4,600; Referees: (Serbia) Ilija Belošević (Serbia) Milivoje Jovčić (Serbia) Uroš Obrknežević

Starters:			Pts	Reb	Ast
PG	10	(Bosnia and Herzegovina) Nemanja Gordić	23	0	5
G	22	(United States) Kyle Gibson	16	4	4
G/F	4	(Montenegro) Suad Šehović	4	4	0
PF	5	(Kosovo) Justin Doellman	7	3	1
C	19	(Montenegro) Zoran Nikolić	11	6	1
Reserves:					
PG	2	(Montenegro) Nikola Ivanović	12	1	3
SF	8	(Montenegro) Sead Šehović	0	0	0
SG	9	(Montenegro) Milić Starovlah	DNP		
F	13	(Montenegro) Aleksa Ilić	7	4	0
PG	30	(Montenegro) Petar Popović	2	1	0
F	33	(Canada) Kyle Landry	2	1	0
PF	34	(Montenegro) Danilo Nikolić	0	2	0
Head coach:
(Serbia) Aleksandar Džikić

Budućnost	Cedevita

Starters:			Pts	Reb	Ast
PG	1	(Croatia) Roko Ukić	2	2	2
SG	2	(Croatia) Filip Krušlin	12	3	0
F	8	(United States) Demetris Nichols	19	1	4
PF	26	(Croatia) Damir Markota	6	3	1
C	31	(Bosnia and Herzegovina) Andrija Stipanović	8	4	3
Reserves:					
SG	3	(Croatia) Toni Perković	DNP		
C	4	(United States) Chris Johnson	DNP		
F	10	(Croatia) Nik Slavica	DNP		
C	11	(Croatia) Karlo Žganec	7	4	0
SF	13	(Bosnia and Herzegovina) Džanan Musa	5	6	3
PG	22	(United States) Will Cherry	24	5	1
SF	27	(Croatia) Ivan Ramljak	0	0	0
Head coach:
(Slovenia) Jure Zdovc

=== 2nd leg ===
25 March 2018	Cedevita (Croatia)	82–75 (Series: 1–1)	(Montenegro) Budućnost VOLI	Zagreb
18:00	Scoring by quarter: 23–17, 21–16, 17–19, 21–23
	Pts: Nichols 25; Rebs: Johnson, Nichols 7 Asts: three players 4 PIR: Nichols 30	Boxscore	Pts: Gibson 20; Rebs: Doellman 8 Asts: Ivanović, Gibson 4 PIR: Gibson 22	Arena: Dom Sportova; Attendance: 2,200; Referees: (Slovenia) Damir Javor (Slovenia) Mario Majkić (Slovenia) Sašo Petek

Starters:			Pts	Reb	Ast
PG	1	(Croatia) Roko Ukić	10	0	4
SG	2	(Croatia) Filip Krušlin	13	4	0
F	8	(United States) Demetris Nichols	25	7	2
PF	26	(Croatia) Damir Markota	7	3	0
C	31	(Bosnia and Herzegovina) Andrija Stipanović	4	5	3
Reserves:					
SG	3	(Croatia) Toni Perković	DNP		
C	4	(United States) Chris Johnson	2	7	4
F	10	(Croatia) Nik Slavica	DNP		
C	11	(Croatia) Karlo Žganec	2	0	0
SF	13	(Bosnia and Herzegovina) Džanan Musa	5	2	0
PG	22	(United States) Will Cherry	10	4	4
SF	27	(Croatia) Ivan Ramljak	4	2	0
Head coach:
(Slovenia) Jure Zdovc

Cedevita	Budućnost

Starters:			Pts	Reb	Ast
PG	10	(Bosnia and Herzegovina) Nemanja Gordić	12	2	2
G	22	(United States) Kyle Gibson	20	4	4
G/F	4	(Montenegro) Suad Šehović	3	2	0
PF	5	(Kosovo) Justin Doellman	10	8	1
C	19	(Montenegro) Zoran Nikolić	2	2	1
Reserves:					
PG	2	(Montenegro) Nikola Ivanović	16	3	4
SF	8	(Montenegro) Sead Šehović	0	3	1
SG	9	(Montenegro) Milić Starovlah	DNP		
F	13	(Montenegro) Aleksa Ilić	0	0	0
PG	30	(Montenegro) Petar Popović	0	0	0
F	33	(Canada) Kyle Landry	12	3	0
PF	34	(Montenegro) Danilo Nikolić	0	0	0
Head coach:
(Serbia) Aleksandar Džikić

25 March 2018	Mornar (Montenegro)	88–84 (Series: 1–1)	(Serbia) Crvena zvezda mts	Bar
20:00	Scoring by quarter: 30–21, 18–24, 21–19, 19–20
	Pts: Vranješ 29; Rebs: Mićović 7 Asts: Needham 5 PIR: Vranješ, Needham 28	Boxscore	Pts: Rochestie 16; Rebs: Davidovac, Dobrić 6 Asts: Feldeine, Rochestie 4 PIR: Davidovac, Rochestie 21	Arena: Topolica Sport Hall; Attendance: 3,000; Referees: (Croatia) Sreten Radović (Slovenia) Matej Boltauzer (Serbia) Marko Juras

Starters:			Pts	Reb	Ast
PG	5	(Montenegro) Derek Needham	28	3	5
SG	44	(Montenegro) Boris Bakić	0	1	0
SG	41	(Montenegro) Nemanja Vranješ	29	3	2
PF	4	(Serbia) Strahinja Mićović	6	7	1
C	17	(Montenegro) Radoje Vujošević	10	4	0
Reserves:					
SG	1	(Montenegro) Lazar Pavićević	DNP		
SG	3	(Montenegro) Marko Čalić	1	2	0
PG	10	(Montenegro) Marko Mijović	DNP		
PF	14	(Montenegro) Vukota Pavić	4	4	0
SG	22	(Montenegro) Marko Mugoša	DNP		
PG	24	(United States) Brandis Raley-Ross	10	3	1
Head coach:
(Montenegro) Mihailo Pavićević

Mornar	Crvena zvezda

Starters:			Pts	Reb	Ast
G	22	(Montenegro) Taylor Rochestie	16	1	4
G/F	7	(Serbia) Dejan Davidovac	14	6	2
G/F	10	(Serbia) Branko Lazić	0	1	0
F/C	51	(Montenegro) Milko Bjelica	8	2	0
F/C	26	(France) Mathias Lessort	8	2	0
Reserves:					
SF	4	(Serbia) Marko Kešelj	DNP		
F/C	12	(North Macedonia) Pero Antić	9	3	1
G/F	13	(Serbia) Ognjen Dobrić	11	6	0
SG	14	(Dominican Republic) James Feldeine	5	1	4
F/C	16	(Serbia) Stefan Janković	0	1	0
C	23	(Slovenia) Alen Omić	11	5	1
PG	31	(Jamaica) Dylan Ennis	2	2	2
Head coach:
(Serbia) Dušan Alimpijević

=== 3rd leg ===
1 April 2018	Budućnost VOLI (Montenegro)	72–57 (Series: 2–1)	(Croatia) Cedevita	Podgorica
19:00	Scoring by quarter: 11–17, 17–15, 17–14, 27–11
	Pts: Popović 14; Rebs: Doellman, Landry 6 Asts: Gibson 5 PIR: Ivanović 16	Boxscore	Pts: Ukić 12; Rebs: Stipanović 7 Asts: Krušlin 4 PIR: Stipanović 12	Arena: Morača Sports Center; Attendance: 4,600; Referees: (Serbia) Ilija Belošević (Slovenia) Matej Boltauzer (Slovenia) Saša Pukl

Starters:			Pts	Reb	Ast
PG	10	(Bosnia and Herzegovina) Nemanja Gordić	9	4	4
G	22	(United States) Kyle Gibson	6	2	5
G/F	4	(Montenegro) Suad Šehović	6	4	0
PF	5	(Kosovo) Justin Doellman	8	6	2
C	19	(Montenegro) Zoran Nikolić	3	4	0
Reserves:					
PG	2	(Montenegro) Nikola Ivanović	13	5	4
F/C	6	(Montenegro) Filip Barović	2	3	0
SF	8	(Montenegro) Sead Šehović	DNP		
F	13	(Montenegro) Aleksa Ilić	DNP		
PG	30	(Montenegro) Petar Popović	14	4	0
F	33	(Canada) Kyle Landry	11	6	0
PF	34	(Montenegro) Danilo Nikolić	0	0	0
Head coach:
(Serbia) Aleksandar Džikić

Budućnost	Cedevita

Starters:			Pts	Reb	Ast
PG	1	(Croatia) Roko Ukić	12	3	1
SG	2	(Croatia) Filip Krušlin	8	4	4
F	8	(United States) Demetris Nichols	7	6	0
PF	26	(Croatia) Damir Markota	4	2	1
C	31	(Bosnia and Herzegovina) Andrija Stipanović	9	7	1
Reserves:					
SG	3	(Croatia) Toni Perković	DNP		
C	4	(United States) Chris Johnson	4	0	1
F	10	(Croatia) Nik Slavica	DNP		
C	11	(Croatia) Karlo Žganec	0	0	0
SF	13	(Bosnia and Herzegovina) Džanan Musa	4	1	1
PG	22	(United States) Will Cherry	7	2	2
SF	27	(Croatia) Ivan Ramljak	2	1	0
Head coach:
(Slovenia) Jure Zdovc

2 April 2018	Crvena zvezda mts (Serbia)	88–69 (Series: 2–1)	(Montenegro) Mornar	Belgrade
21:00	Scoring by quarter: 26–19, 26–18, 16–19, 20–13
	Pts: Dobrić 19; Rebs: Bjelica 7 Asts: Rochestie 6 PIR: Dobrić 23	Boxscore	Pts: Vranješ 21; Rebs: Mićović 7 Asts: Needham 4 PIR: Vranješ 16	Arena: Aleksandar Nikolić Hall; Attendance: 7,036; Referees: (Slovenia) Mario Majkić (Slovenia) Sašo Petek (Montenegro) Igor Dragojević

Starters:			Pts	Reb	Ast
G	22	(Montenegro) Taylor Rochestie	18	2	6
G/F	10	(Serbia) Branko Lazić	0	0	2
G/F	13	(Serbia) Ognjen Dobrić	19	4	1
F/C	51	(Montenegro) Milko Bjelica	7	7	2
F/C	26	(France) Mathias Lessort	10	5	1
Reserves:					
SF	4	(Serbia) Marko Kešelj	DNP		
G/F	7	(Serbia) Dejan Davidovac	6	6	2
SG	14	(Dominican Republic) James Feldeine	8	0	1
F/C	16	(Serbia) Stefan Janković	6	3	1
C	23	(Slovenia) Alen Omić	11	2	2
PG	31	(Jamaica) Dylan Ennis	3	3	4
F/C	32	(Serbia) Nikola Jovanović	DNP		
Head coach:
(Serbia) Dušan Alimpijević

Crvena zvezda	Mornar

Starters:			Pts	Reb	Ast
PG	5	(Montenegro) Derek Needham	11	3	4
SG	44	(Montenegro) Boris Bakić	6	2	0
SG	41	(Montenegro) Nemanja Vranješ	21	5	1
PF	4	(Serbia) Strahinja Mićović	9	7	1
C	17	(Montenegro) Radoje Vujošević	8	4	0
Reserves:					
SG	1	(Montenegro) Lazar Pavićević	0	0	1
SG	3	(Montenegro) Marko Čalić	0	0	0
PG	10	(Montenegro) Marko Mijović	6	0	0
PF	14	(Montenegro) Vukota Pavić	2	5	1
SG	22	(Montenegro) Marko Mugoša	0	1	0
PG	24	(United States) Brandis Raley-Ross	6	4	2
C	55	(Serbia) Uroš Luković	0	3	1
Head coach:
(Montenegro) Mihailo Pavićević

== Finals ==
Team 1	Series	Team 2	Game 1	Game 2	Game 3	Game 4	Game 5
Crvena zvezda mts (Serbia)	1–3	(Montenegro) Budućnost VOLI	76–80	69–59	77–78	73–77	

=== 1st leg ===
9 April 2018	Crvena zvezda mts (Serbia)	76–80 (Series: 0–1)	(Montenegro) Budućnost VOLI	Belgrade
19:00	Scoring by quarter: 22–25, 16–12, 19–26, 19–17
	Pts: Omić 14; Rebs: Lessort 5 Asts: Rochestie 10; PIR: Rochestie 20	Boxscore	Pts: Ivanović 20; Rebs: Doellman 8 Asts: Doellman, Gordić 4 PIR: Ivanović, Gordić 23	Arena: Aleksandar Nikolić Hall; Attendance: 7,001; Referees: (Slovenia) Matej Boltauzer (Croatia) Sreten Radović (Croatia) Tomislav Hordov

Starters:			Pts	Reb	Ast
G	22	(Montenegro) Taylor Rochestie	13	3	10
G/F	7	(Serbia) Dejan Davidovac	4	4	1
G/F	10	(Serbia) Branko Lazić	2	1	0
F/C	51	(Montenegro) Milko Bjelica	4	2	1
F/C	26	(France) Mathias Lessort	5	5	0
Reserves:					
SF	4	(Serbia) Marko Kešelj	DNP		
G/F	13	(Serbia) Ognjen Dobrić	4	3	1
SG	14	(Dominican Republic) James Feldeine	10	4	1
F/C	16	(Serbia) Stefan Janković	12	3	0
C	23	(Slovenia) Alen Omić	14	2	1
PG	31	(Jamaica) Dylan Ennis	8	1	1
F/C	32	(Serbia) Nikola Jovanović	DNP		
Head coach:
(Serbia) Dušan Alimpijević

Crvena zvezda	Budućnost

Starters:			Pts	Reb	Ast
PG	10	(Bosnia and Herzegovina) Nemanja Gordić	18	3	4
G	22	(United States) Kyle Gibson	10	0	3
G/F	4	(Montenegro) Suad Šehović	3	3	0
PF	5	(Kosovo) Justin Doellman	13	8	4
C	19	(Montenegro) Zoran Nikolić	6	1	1
Reserves:					
PG	2	(Montenegro) Nikola Ivanović	20	4	3
F/C	6	(Montenegro) Filip Barović	2	1	0
SF	8	(Montenegro) Sead Šehović	DNP		
F	13	(Montenegro) Aleksa Ilić	DNP		
PG	30	(Montenegro) Petar Popović	3	0	0
F	33	(Canada) Kyle Landry	5	6	1
PF	34	(Montenegro) Danilo Nikolić	0	3	0
Head coach:
(Serbia) Aleksandar Džikić

=== 2nd leg ===
10 April 2018	Crvena zvezda mts (Serbia)	69–59 (Series: 1–1)	(Montenegro) Budućnost VOLI	Belgrade
18:30	Scoring by quarter: 17–13, 14–18, 16–17, 22–11
	Pts: Omić 15; Rebs: Omić 10; Asts: Feldeine, Rochestie 5 PIR: Omić 27	Boxscore	Pts: Gordić 22; Rebs: Doellman 6 Asts: three players 2 PIR: Gordić 12	Arena: Aleksandar Nikolić Hall; Attendance: 6,398; Referees: (Serbia) Ilija Belošević (Slovenia) Saša Pukl (Montenegro) Miloš Koljenšić

Starters:			Pts	Reb	Ast
G	22	(Montenegro) Taylor Rochestie	11	2	5
SG	14	(Dominican Republic) James Feldeine	9	2	5
G/F	10	(Serbia) Branko Lazić	3	5	1
F/C	51	(Montenegro) Milko Bjelica	4	1	0
C	23	(Slovenia) Alen Omić	15	10	1
Reserves:					
SF	4	(Serbia) Marko Kešelj	DNP		
G/F	7	(Serbia) Dejan Davidovac	3	4	2
G/F	13	(Serbia) Ognjen Dobrić	10	6	0
F/C	16	(Serbia) Stefan Janković	4	6	0
F/C	26	(France) Mathias Lessort	8	2	0
PG	31	(Jamaica) Dylan Ennis	2	1	2
F/C	32	(Serbia) Nikola Jovanović	0	0	0
Head coach:
(Serbia) Dušan Alimpijević

Crvena zvezda	Budućnost

Starters:			Pts	Reb	Ast
PG	10	(Bosnia and Herzegovina) Nemanja Gordić	22	1	2
G	22	(United States) Kyle Gibson	2	2	1
G/F	4	(Montenegro) Suad Šehović	4	4	0
PF	5	(Kosovo) Justin Doellman	10	6	2
C	19	(Montenegro) Zoran Nikolić	0	2	1
Reserves:					
PG	2	(Montenegro) Nikola Ivanović	9	1	2
F/C	6	(Montenegro) Filip Barović	6	2	0
SF	8	(Montenegro) Sead Šehović	0	0	0
F	13	(Montenegro) Aleksa Ilić	DNP		
PG	30	(Montenegro) Petar Popović	4	1	0
F	33	(Canada) Kyle Landry	2	3	1
PF	34	(Montenegro) Danilo Nikolić	0	2	0
Head coach:
(Serbia) Aleksandar Džikić

=== 3rd leg ===
13 April 2018	Budućnost VOLI (Montenegro)	78–77 (Series: 2–1)	(Serbia) Crvena zvezda mts	Podgorica
20:00	Scoring by quarter: 24–23, 18–24, 26–17, 10–13
	Pts: Gordić 17; Rebs: three players 4 Asts: Gordić 5 PIR: Gordić 21	Boxscore	Pts: Feldeine 19; Rebs: Lessort, Bjelica 6 Asts: Feldeine, Rochestie 5 PIR: Feldeine 20	Arena: Morača Sports Center; Attendance: 6,000; Referees: (Slovenia) Damir Javor (Croatia) Tomislav Hordov (Slovenia) Mario Majkić

Starters:			Pts	Reb	Ast
PG	10	(Bosnia and Herzegovina) Nemanja Gordić	17	2	5
G	22	(United States) Kyle Gibson	10	4	3
G/F	4	(Montenegro) Suad Šehović	3	2	0
PF	5	(Kosovo) Justin Doellman	5	1	1
C	19	(Montenegro) Zoran Nikolić	12	4	0
Reserves:					
PG	2	(Montenegro) Nikola Ivanović	10	4	3
F/C	6	(Montenegro) Filip Barović	10	3	0
SF	8	(Montenegro) Sead Šehović	3	1	0
F	13	(Montenegro) Aleksa Ilić	DNP		
PG	30	(Montenegro) Petar Popović	5	1	2
F	33	(Canada) Kyle Landry	3	2	0
PF	34	(Montenegro) Danilo Nikolić	0	1	0
Head coach:
(Serbia) Aleksandar Džikić

Budućnost	Crvena zvezda

Starters:			Pts	Reb	Ast
G	22	(Montenegro) Taylor Rochestie	12	2	5
SG	14	(Dominican Republic) James Feldeine	19	1	5
G/F	10	(Serbia) Branko Lazić	2	3	3
F/C	51	(Montenegro) Milko Bjelica	4	6	2
C	23	(Slovenia) Alen Omić	18	4	3
Reserves:					
SF	4	(Serbia) Marko Kešelj	DNP		
G/F	7	(Serbia) Dejan Davidovac	0	0	0
G/F	13	(Serbia) Ognjen Dobrić	5	4	0
F/C	16	(Serbia) Stefan Janković	3	3	0
F/C	26	(France) Mathias Lessort	6	6	0
PG	31	(Jamaica) Dylan Ennis	8	0	0
F/C	32	(Serbia) Nikola Jovanović	DNP		
Head coach:
(Serbia) Dušan Alimpijević

=== 4th leg ===
14 April 2018	Budućnost VOLI (Montenegro)	77–73 (Series: 3–1)	(Serbia) Crvena zvezda mts	Podgorica
21:00	Scoring by quarter: 22–15, 14–23, 24–19, 17–16
	Pts: Gordić 18; Rebs: Su. Šehović 6 Asts: Gordić 5 PIR: Barović 23	Boxscore	Pts: Rochestie 14; Rebs: Omić 10; Asts: Rochestie 6 PIR: Omić 21	Arena: Morača Sports Center; Attendance: 6,000; Referees: (Croatia) Sreten Radović (Slovenia) Saša Pukl (Slovenia) Sašo Petek

Starters:			Pts	Reb	Ast
PG	10	(Bosnia and Herzegovina) Nemanja Gordić	18	3	5
G	22	(United States) Kyle Gibson	7	5	1
G/F	4	(Montenegro) Suad Šehović	5	6	0
PF	5	(Kosovo) Justin Doellman	0	2	0
C	19	(Montenegro) Zoran Nikolić	0	0	1
Reserves:					
PG	2	(Montenegro) Nikola Ivanović	17	3	1
F/C	6	(Montenegro) Filip Barović	14	3	2
SF	8	(Montenegro) Sead Šehović	0	1	0
F	13	(Montenegro) Aleksa Ilić	DNP		
PG	30	(Montenegro) Petar Popović	5	3	0
F	33	(Canada) Kyle Landry	6	1	1
PF	34	(Montenegro) Danilo Nikolić	5	4	0
Head coach:
(Serbia) Aleksandar Džikić

Budućnost	Crvena zvezda

Starters:			Pts	Reb	Ast
G	22	(Montenegro) Taylor Rochestie	14	7	6
SG	14	(Dominican Republic) James Feldeine	11	1	4
G/F	10	(Serbia) Branko Lazić	6	1	0
F/C	51	(Montenegro) Milko Bjelica	0	2	0
C	23	(Slovenia) Alen Omić	12	10	2
Reserves:					
SF	4	(Serbia) Marko Kešelj	DNP		
G/F	7	(Serbia) Dejan Davidovac	4	6	0
G/F	13	(Serbia) Ognjen Dobrić	11	3	0
F/C	16	(Serbia) Stefan Janković	3	0	0
F/C	26	(France) Mathias Lessort	7	4	0
PG	31	(Jamaica) Dylan Ennis	5	3	4
F/C	32	(Serbia) Nikola Jovanović	DNP		
Head coach:
(Serbia) Dušan Alimpijević

== See also ==
- 2018 ABA League Second Division Final Four
- 2017 ABA League Playoffs
- 2017–18 KK Crvena zvezda season
