= KK Crvena zvezda accomplishments and records =

This page details the all-time statistics, records, and other achievements pertaining to the Crvena zvezda. Crvena zvezda is a Serbian men's professional basketball team currently playing in the ABA League, the EuroLeague and in the Basketball League of Serbia.

== Overview ==
Note: Statistics are correct through the end of the 2017–18 season.

Competition	Record							
Competition	Pld	W	D	L	PF	PA	PD	Win %
National Leagues	1,615	1,039	10	566	136,369	126,694	+9675	64.33
Adriatic League	454	308	0	146	37,190	34,305	+2885	67.84
National Cups	175	130	0	45	0	0	+0	74.29
European Competitions	444	231	2	211	0	0	+0	52.03
Total	2,688	1,708	12	968	173,559	160,999	+12560	63.54

Last updated: September 11, 2018
Source: Competitions

== Honours ==
Total titles: 49

Honours		No.	Years
National league – 24 (Record)
Yugoslav League (1946–1992)	Winners	12	1946, 1947, 1948, 1949, 1950, 1951, 1952, 1953, 1954, 1955, 1968–69, 1971–72
Serbia and Montenegro League (1992–2006)	Winners	3	1992–93, 1993–94, 1997–98
Serbian League (2006–present)	Winners	9	2014–15, 2015–16, 2016–17, 2017–18, 2018–19, 2020–21, 2021–22, 2022–23, 2023–24
National cup – 15
Yugoslav Cup (1959–2002)	Winners	3	1970–71, 1972–73, 1974–75
Serbian Cup (2002–present)	Winners	12	2003–04, 2005–06, 2012–13, 2013–14, 2014–15, 2016–17, 2020–21, 2021–22, 2022–23, 2023–24, 2024–25, 2025–26
National supercup – 1
Yugoslav Super Cup (1993)	Winners	1	1993
Regional competitions – 8
Adriatic League (2001–present)	Winners	7	2014–15, 2015–16, 2016–17, 2018–19, 2020–21, 2021–22, 2023–24
Adriatic Super Cup (2017–present)	Winners	1	2018
European competitions – 1
FIBA Saporta Cup (1966–2002)	Winners	1	1973–74

Source: Crvena zvezda

Other tournaments

- Magenta SportCup
  - Winner (1): 2021

== Individual awards and accomplishments ==
=== Naismith Memorial Basketball Hall of Fame ===
Crvena zvezda Hall of Famers
Players
No.	Name	Position	Tenure	Inducted
12	Vlade Divac	C	1999	2019
15	Dražen Dalipagić	SF	1990–1991	2004
Coaches
Name		Position	Tenure	Inducted
Aleksandar Nikolić		Head coach	1973–1974	1998
Contributors
Name		Position	Tenure	Inducted
Borislav Stanković		Player	1946–1948	1991

=== FIBA Hall of Fame ===
Crvena zvezda Hall of Famers
Players
No.	Name	Position	Tenure	Inducted
8	Peja Stojaković	SF	1992–1993	2024
12	Vlade Divac	C	1999	2010
15	Dražen Dalipagić	SF	1990–1991	2007
15	Zoran Slavnić	PG	1967–1977	2013
Coaches
Name		Position	Tenure	Inducted
Aleksandar Nikolić		Head coach	1973–1974	2007
Svetislav Pešić		Head coach	2008–2009, 2011–2012	2020
Ranko Žeravica		Head coach	1979–1986	2007
Contributors
Name		Position	Tenure	Inducted
Nebojša Popović		Player, Coach	1945–1955	2007
Borislav Stanković		Player	1946–1948	2007
Radomir Šaper		Player	1945	2007

=== FIBA Order of Merit recipients ===
FIBA Order of Merit recipients
Order	Name	Tenure	Inducted
19	Aleksandar Nikolić	1945, 1947–1949 as player 1973–1974 as coach	1995
27	Nebojša Popović	1945–1951 as player 1945–1955 as coach	1997
39	Radomir Šaper	1945 as player	1999
65	Borislav Stanković	1946–1948 as player	2015

=== FIBA's 50 Greatest Players ===
Crvena zvezda Players
No.	Name	Position	Tenure	Inducted
12	Vlade Divac	C	1999	1991
15	Dražen Dalipagić	SF	1990–1991	1991
15	Zoran Slavnić	PG	1967–1977	1991

=== 50 Greatest EuroLeague Contributors ===
Crvena zvezda EuroLeague Contributors
Players
No.	Name	Position	Tenure	Inducted
12	Vlade Divac	C	1999	2008
15	Dražen Dalipagić	SF	1990–1991	2008
Coaches
Name		Position	Tenure	Inducted
Aleksandar Nikolić		Head coach	1973–1974	2008
Božidar Maljković		Assistant coach	1983–1986	2008

- Other player nominees: Zoran Slavnić
- Other coaching nominees: Ranko Žeravica, Svetislav Pešić

=== EuroLeague 25th Anniversary Team ===
Crvena zvezda Players
No.	Name	Position	Tenure	Inducted
13	Vasilije Micić	PG	2015–2016	2025
4	Miloš Teodosić	PG	2023–2025	2025

=== European Competitions ===
All-EuroLeague First Team

- Boban Marjanović – 2015

All-EuroLeague Second Team

- Quincy Miller – 2016

EuroLeague MVP of the Month

- Ognjen Kuzmić – January 2017
- Luca Vildoza – December 2022

EuroLeague MVP of the Round

- DeMarcus Nelson – 2013–14
- Boban Marjanović – 2013–14, 2014–15 (3×)
- Maik Zirbes – 2015–16
- James Feldeine – 2017–18
- Jordan Loyd – 2020–21
- Filip Petrušev – 2022–23
- Miloš Teodosić – 2023–24
- Filip Petrušev – 2024–25

FIBA European Cup Winners' Cup Finals Top Scorer

- Dragan Kapičić – 1974
- Zoran Slavnić – 1975

ULEB Cup regular season MVP

- Milan Gurović – 2007

ULEB Cup MVP of the Round

- Milan Gurović – 2007 (3×)
- Mike Taylor – 2010

ULEB Cup Top Scorer

- Milan Gurović – 2007

All-EuroCup First Team

- DeMarcus Nelson – 2014

=== Adriatic Competitions ===
ABA League MVP

- Milan Gurović – 2007
- Tadija Dragićević – 2008
- Nikola Kalinić – 2022

ABA League Finals MVP

- Raško Katić – 2013
- Boban Marjanović – 2015
- Stefan Jović – 2016
- Charles Jenkins – 2017
- Billy Baron – 2019
- Landry Nnoko – 2021
- Ognjen Dobrić – 2022
- Yago dos Santos – 2024

ABA League Top Scorer

- Igor Rakočević – 2004
- Milan Gurović – 2007
- Tadija Dragićević – 2008

ABA League Coach of the Season

- Dejan Radonjić – 2014, 2015

ABA League Best Defender

- Branko Lazić – 2021, 2022, 2024

ABA League Top Prospect

- Nikola Topić – 2024

ABA League Player of the Month Award

- Boban Marjanović – November 2014
- Maik Zirbes – February 2016
- Milko Bjelica – November 2017
- Luca Vildoza – October 2022
- Facundo Campazzo – January 2023
- Nemanja Nedović – February 2023

ABA League Ideal Starting Five

- DeMarcus Nelson – 2014
- Boban Marjanović – 2014, 2015
- Maik Zirbes – 2016
- Stefan Jović – 2017
- Charles Jenkins – 2017
- Marko Simonović – 2017
- Taylor Rochestie – 2018
- Joe Ragland – 2019
- Stratos Perperoglou – 2019
- Jordan Loyd – 2021
- Nikola Kalinić – 2022
- Facundo Campazzo – 2023
- Nikola Topić – 2024
- Miloš Teodosić – 2024
- Filip Petrušev – 2025

ABA Super Cup MVP

- Mouhammad Faye – 2018

=== National Competitions ===
(Socialist Federal Republic of Yugoslavia) Yugoslavia

Yugoslav League Top Scorer

- Milan Bjegojević – 1953
- Borislav Ćurčić – 1955
- Branko Radović – 1959
- Vladimir Cvetković – 1966, 1967
- Boban Janković – 1992

Serbia and Montenegro

YUBA League MVP

- Nebojša Ilić – 1993
- Mileta Lisica – 1994

YUBA League Most Improved Player

- Igor Rakočević – 1998

YUBA League Young MVP

- Predrag Stojaković – 1993

Serbia

BLS Super League MVP

- Boban Marjanović – 2014, 2015

BLS Finals MVP

- Milan Gurović – 2007
- Omar Thomas – 2012
- Maik Zirbes – 2016
- Ognjen Dobrić – 2017, 2021
- Alen Omić – 2018
- Nikola Ivanović – 2022
- Luka Mitrović – 2023
- Dejan Davidovac – 2024

National Cup

Radivoj Korać Cup MVP

- Goran Jeretin – 2004, 2006
- DeMarcus Nelson – 2013
- Luka Mitrović – 2015
- Marko Gudurić – 2017
- Marko Jagodić-Kuridža – 2021
- Nate Wolters – 2022
- Ognjen Dobrić – 2023
- Miloš Teodosić – 2024
- Filip Petrušev – 2025

Radivoj Korać Cup Top Scorer

- Mile Ilić – 2012
- Michael Scott – 2013
- Raško Katić – 2014
- Luka Mitrović – 2015
- Marko Simonović – 2017
- Ognjen Dobrić – 2023

== Medals with National teams ==
List of the Crvena zvezda players who won a medal with their respective national team at the Summer Olympics, the FIBA Basketball World Cup and the FIBA EuroBasket.

Summer Olympics

- (silver) (Serbia) Stefan Jović (2016 Rio de Janeiro)
- (silver) (Serbia) Marko Simonović (2016 Rio de Janeiro)
- (silver) (Serbia) Vladimir Štimac (2016 Rio de Janeiro)
- (silver) (Socialist Federal Republic of Yugoslavia) Zoran Slavnić (1976 Montreal)
- (silver) (Socialist Federal Republic of Yugoslavia) Vladimir Cvetković (1968 Mexico City)
- (bronze) (Serbia) Dejan Davidovac (2024 Paris)
- (bronze) (Serbia) Ognjen Dobrić (2024 Paris)
- (bronze) (Serbia) Uroš Plavšić (2024 Paris)
- (bronze) (Australia) Duop Reath (2020 Tokyo)
- (bronze) (Socialist Federal Republic of Yugoslavia) Rajko Žižić (1984 Los Angeles)

World Cup

- (gold) (Serbia and Montenegro) Milenko Topić (1998 Greece)
- (gold) (Socialist Federal Republic of Yugoslavia) Zoran Jovanović (1990 Argentina)
- (gold) (Socialist Federal Republic of Yugoslavia) Ljubodrag Simonović (1970 Yugoslavia)
- (gold) (Socialist Federal Republic of Yugoslavia) Dragan Kapičić (1970 Yugoslavia)
- (silver) (Serbia) Dejan Davidovac (2023 Philippines, Japan, Indonesia)
- (silver) (Serbia) Marko Simonović (2014 Spain)
- (silver) (Serbia) Nikola Kalinić (2014 Spain)
- (silver) (Serbia) Raško Katić (2014 Spain)
- (silver) (Socialist Federal Republic of Yugoslavia) Zoran Slavnić (1974 Puerto Rico)
- (silver) (Socialist Federal Republic of Yugoslavia) Dragan Kapičić (1974 Puerto Rico)
- (silver) (Socialist Federal Republic of Yugoslavia) Vladimir Cvetković (1967 Uruguay)
- (silver) (Socialist Federal Republic of Yugoslavia) Vladimir Cvetković (1963 Brazil)
- (bronze) (Socialist Federal Republic of Yugoslavia) Zoran Radović (1986 Spain)
- (bronze) (Socialist Federal Republic of Yugoslavia) Zoran Radović (1982 Colombia)
- (bronze) (Socialist Federal Republic of Yugoslavia) Zufer Avdija (1982 Colombia)
- (bronze) (Socialist Federal Republic of Yugoslavia) Rajko Žižić (1982 Colombia)

EuroBasket

- (gold) (Serbia and Montenegro) Milenko Topić (1997 Spain)
- (gold) (Serbia and Montenegro) Zoran Sretenović (1995 Greece)
- (gold) (Serbia and Montenegro) Dejan Tomašević (1995 Greece)
- (gold) (Socialist Federal Republic of Yugoslavia) Zoran Jovanović (1991 Italy)
- (gold) (Socialist Federal Republic of Yugoslavia) Zoran Radović (1989 Yugoslavia)
- (gold) (Socialist Federal Republic of Yugoslavia) Zoran Slavnić (1977 Belgium)
- (gold) (Socialist Federal Republic of Yugoslavia) Zoran Slavnić (1975 Yugoslavia)
- (gold) (Socialist Federal Republic of Yugoslavia) Dragan Kapičić (1975 Yugoslavia)
- (gold) (Socialist Federal Republic of Yugoslavia) Zoran Slavnić (1973 Spain)
- (silver) (Serbia) Stefan Jović (2017 Turkey)
- (silver) (Serbia) Marko Gudurić (2017 Turkey)
- (silver) (Serbia) Branko Lazić (2017 Turkey)
- (silver) (Serbia) Ognjen Kuzmić (2017 Turkey)
- (silver) (Serbia) Nemanja Bjelica (2009 Poland)
- (silver) (Socialist Federal Republic of Yugoslavia) Ljubodrag Simonović (1971 West Germany)
- (silver) (Socialist Federal Republic of Yugoslavia) Dragan Kapičić (1971 West Germany)
- (silver) (Socialist Federal Republic of Yugoslavia) Dragiša Vučinić (1971 West Germany)
- (silver) (Socialist Federal Republic of Yugoslavia) Ljubodrag Simonović (1969 Italy)
- (silver) (Socialist Federal Republic of Yugoslavia) Dragan Kapičić (1969 Italy)
- (silver) (Socialist Federal Republic of Yugoslavia) Vladimir Cvetković (1969 Italy)
- (silver) (Socialist Federal Republic of Yugoslavia) Sreten Dragojlović (1961 Yugoslavia)
- (bronze) (Serbia and Montenegro) Dragan Lukovski (1999 France)
- (bronze) (Serbia and Montenegro) Saša Obradović (1999 France)
- (bronze) (Serbia and Montenegro) Milenko Topić (1999 France)
- (bronze) (Socialist Federal Republic of Yugoslavia) Zoran Radović (1987 Greece)

== Competitions ==
=== National Leagues ===
==== First Federal Basketball League ====
Positions by year

#	46	47	48	49	50	51	52	53	54	55	56	57	58	59	60	61	62	63	64	65	66	67	68	69	70	71	72	73	74	75	76	77	78	79	80	81	82	83	84	85	86	87	88	89	90	91
1	1	1	1	1	1	1	1	1	1	1														1			1																			
2														2											2			2											2	2		2			2	
3												3	3						3			3	3			3			3								3									
4											4										4									4								4						4		
5																															5				5	5										
6															6	6																6											3			
7																																		7												
8																	8	8		8													8								8					
9																																														9
10																																														
11																																														
12																																														
13																																														
14																																														

==== YUBA League ====
Positions by year

#	92	93	94	95	96	97	98	99	00	01	02	03	04	05	06
1		1	1				1								
2	2							2							2
3				3					3			3	3		
4														4	
5															
6					6										
7											7				
8															
9															
10										10					
11															
12						12									
13															
14															

==== Basketball League of Serbia ====
Positions by year

#	07	08	09	10	11	12	13	14	15	16	17	18	19	20	21	22	23	24
1									1	1	1	1	1		1	1	1	1
2	2		2			2	2	2										
3																		
4		4		4														
5					5													
6																		
7																		
8																		
9																		
10																		
11																		
12																		

=== Adriatic League ===
The ABA League, commonly known as the Adriatic League, is a regional men's professional basketball league competition between men's teams from six countries: Bosnia and Herzegovina, Croatia, Macedonia, Montenegro, Serbia and Slovenia. Crvena zvezda made the league debut in 2002, in the second season.

==== Standings ====
Season	Regular season								Postseason							
Season	G	W	L	W–L%	PF	PA	PD	Finish	G	W	L	W–L%	PF	PA	PD	Result
2001–02	Did not participate								Did not participate							
2002–03	22	17	5	.773	1,828	1,648	+180	1st	1	0	1	.000	77	78	−1	Lost in Semifinals
2003–04	26	18	8	.692	2,250	2,168	+82	4th	1	0	1	.000	110	113	−3	Lost in Semifinals
2004–05	30	20	10	.667	2,489	2,260	+229	3rd	2	1	1	.500	158	158	±0	Lost in Semifinals
2005–06	26	19	7	.731	2,083	1,886	+197	2nd	2	1	1	.500	164	177	−13	Lost in Semifinals
2006–07	26	15	11	.577	2,325	2,212	+113	6th	Did not qualify							
2007–08	26	16	10	.615	2,275	2,212	+63	4th	3	1	2	.333	227	272	−45	Lost in Quarterfinals
2008–09	26	19	7	.731	2,010	1,913	+97	4th	1	0	1	.000	58	64	−6	Lost in Semifinals
2009–10	26	11	15	.423	2,069	2,012	+57	9th	Did not qualify							
2010–11	26	8	18	.308	1,994	2,135	−141	13th	Did not qualify							
2011–12	26	11	15	.423	2,074	2,091	−17	10th	Did not qualify							
2012–13	26	18	8	.692	2,097	1,889	+208	2nd	2	1	1	.500	142	149	−7	Lost in Finals
2013–14	26	22	4	.846	2,017	1,725	+292	1st	1	0	1	.000	70	75	−5	Lost in Semifinals
2014–15	26	24	2	.923	2,147	1,790	+357	1st	8	6	2	.750	605	567	+38	Won Championship
2015–16	26	20	6	.769	2,046	1,800	+246	2nd	5	5	0	1.000	419	364	+55	Won Championship
2016–17	26	25	1	.962	2,226	1,762	+464	1st	6	5	1	.833	463	389	+74	Won Championship
2017–18	22	19	3	.864	1,955	1,679	+276	1st	7	3	4	.429	558	514	+44	Lost in Finals
2018–19	22	21	1	.955	1,875	1,517	+358	1st	8	5	3	.625	704	593	+111	Won Championship
2019–20	21	14	7	.667	1,758	1,562	+196	3rd	Canceled due to the COVID-19 pandemic							
2020–21	26	23	3	.885	2,064	1,694	+370	1st	8	5	3	.625	605	568	+37	Won Championship
2021–22	26	24	2	.923	2,140	1,819	+321	1st	8	5	3	.625	667	664	+3	Won Championship
2022–23	26	23	3	.885	2,262	1,890	+372	2nd	9	6	3	.667	766	652	+114	Lost in Finals
2023–24	26	22	4	.846	2,310	1,877	+433	1st	7	7	0	1.000	619	531	+88	Won Championship
2024–25	30	23	7	.767	2,672	2,365	+307	4th	5	3	2	.600	430	433	−3	Lost in Semifinals
2025–26				–	0	0	0	TBD	TBD							
Totals	589	432	157	.733	48,966	43,906	+5,060		84	54	30	.643	6,842	6,361	+481	

==== Positions by year ====
#	03	04	05	06	07	08	09	10	11	12	13	14	15	16	17	18	19	20	21	22
1													1	1	1		1		1	1
2											2					2				
3	3		3	3								3						3		
4		4					4													
5						5														
6					6															
7																				
8																				
9								9												
10										10										
11																				
12																				
13									13											
14																				
15																				
16																				

=== National Cups ===
==== Yugoslav Cup ====
Positions by year (SFR Yugoslavia)

#	59	60	62	69	70	71	72	73	74	75	76	77	78	79	80	81	82	83	84	85	86	87	88	89	90	91
1						1		1		1																
2									2																2	
SF							SF											SF					SF			
QF			QF	QF	QF											QF								QF		
8F	8F											8F	8F				8F		8F	8F						
16F		16F									16F			16F							16F	16F				16F
32F															32F											

Positions by year (FR Yugoslavia)

#	92	93	94	95	96	97	98	99	00	01	02
1											
2			2								
SF	SF			SF	SF						
QF							QF	QF	QF		
8F		8F				8F					8F
16F											
32F											
64F											

==== Radivoj Korać Cup ====
Positions by year

#	03	04	05	06	07	08	09	10	11	12	13	14	15	16	17	18	19	20	21	22	23	24	25
1		1		1							1	1	1		1				1	1	1	1	1
2							2			2						2	2	2					
SF	SF				SF	SF			SF					SF									
QF			QF					QF															

== Top performances in Europe ==
Season	Achievement	Notes
European Champions Cup / Euroleague (1st tier)
1969–70	Quarter-finals	3rd place in a group with CSKA Moscow, Ignis Varèse and ASVEL
1972–73	Semi-finals	eliminated by CSKA Moscow, 90–98 (L) in Belgrade and 83–100 (L) in Moscow
2015–16	Quarter-finals	eliminated 3-0 by CSKA Moscow, 74–84 (L) and 76–77 (L) in Moscow and 71–78 (L) in Belgrade
European Cup Winners' Cup / Saporta Cup / ULEB Cup / Eurocup (2nd tier)
1971–72	Final	lost to Simmenthal Milano, 70–74 in the final in Thessaloniki
1973–74	Champions	defeated Spartak ZJŠ Brno 86–75 in the final in Udine
1974–75	Final	lost to Spartak Leningrad, 62–63 in the final in Nantes
1990–91	Quarter-finals	4th place in a group with CAI Zaragoza, PAOK and Hapoel Galil Elyon
2005–06	Quarter-finals	eliminated by Dynamo Moscow, 86–87 (L) in Belgrade and 65–86 (L) in Moscow
2006–07	Quarter-finals	eliminated by Real Madrid, 72–83 (L) in Belgrade and 78–79 (L) in Madrid
2013–14	Semi-finals	eliminated by UNICS, 63–52 (W) in Belgrade and 67–84 (L) in Kazan
Korać Cup (3rd tier)
1980–81	Semi-finals	eliminated by Joventut Freixenet, 89–105 (L) in Barcelona and 73–82 (L) in Belgrade
1981–82	Semi-finals	eliminated by Šibenka, 115–99 (W) in Belgrade and 83–101 (L) in Šibenik
1983–84	Final	lost to Orthez, 73–97 in the final in Paris
1984–85	Semi-finals	eliminated by Simac Milano, 86–109 (L) in Milan and 99–100 (L) in Belgrade
1987–88	Semi-finals	eliminated by Real Madrid, 82–89 (L) in Belgrade and 72–81 (L) in Madrid
1997–98	Final	lost to Mash Verona, 74–68 (W) in Verona and 64–73 (L) in Belgrade

=== The road to the European Victory ===
1973–74 FIBA European Cup Winners' Cup

Round	Team	Home	Away
1st round	(Albania) 17 Nëntori Tirana	114–70	99–83
2nd round	(France) Alsace Bagnolet	102–86	92–94
Quarter-finals	(Bulgaria) CSKA Sofia	80–72	81–88
Quarter-finals	(Italy) Saclà Asti	93–86	88–87
Semi-finals	(Spain) Estudiantes Monteverde	104–85	79–74
Final	(Czechoslovakia) Spartak ZJŠ Brno	86–75	

== Club records ==
=== Most games played ===
List of players who have played at least 350 games.

No	Player	Position	Period	GP
1	(Serbia) Branko Lazić	SG/SF	2011–2025	838
2	(Serbia) Luka Mitrović	C	2012–2017; 2021–2025	524
3	(Serbia) Ognjen Dobrić	SG/SF	2016–2023; 2024–present	497
4	(Socialist Federal Republic of Yugoslavia) Slobodan Nikolić	SG	1975–1987; 1989–1991	429
5	(Socialist Federal Republic of Yugoslavia) Predrag Bogosavljev	C	1976–1989	423
6	(Serbia) Dejan Davidovac	PF	2017–2022; 2023–present	421
7	(Serbia) Marko Simonović	SF	2012–2014; 2015–2017; 2020–2022	388
8	(Socialist Federal Republic of Yugoslavia) Dragiša Vučinić	C	1967–1979	354
8	(Serbia) Vuk Radivojević	PG	2003–2007; 2009–2010; 2011–2013	354

Last updated on: July 6, 2025

=== Most games coached ===
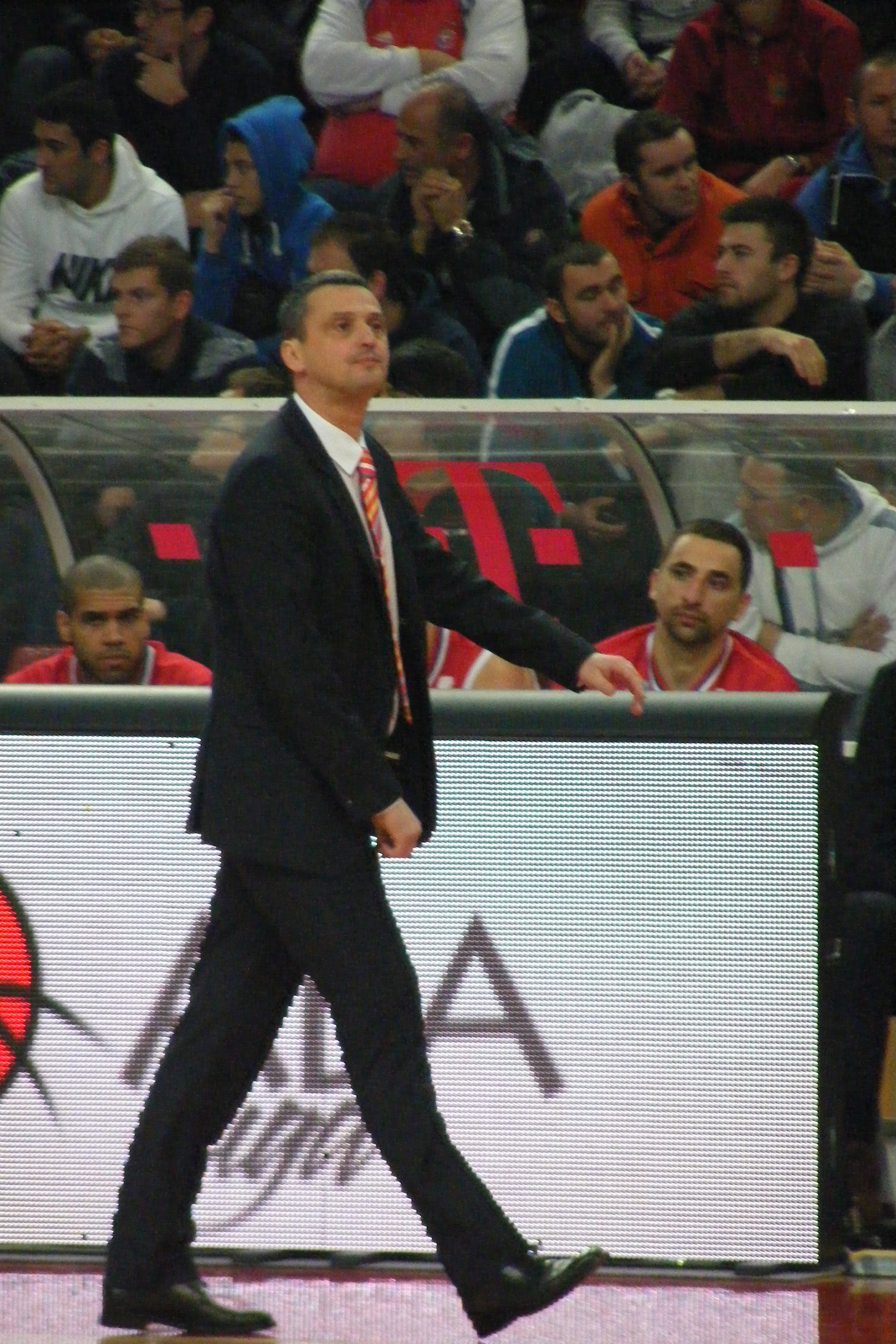
Dejan Radonjić leads for the most games coached and the most games won.

List of coaches who have coached more than 100 games.

#	Name	Period	Games
1	(Montenegro) Dejan Radonjić	2013–2017; 2020–2022	453
2	(Socialist Federal Republic of Yugoslavia) Ranko Žeravica	1979–1986; 1997	275
3	(Socialist Federal Republic of Yugoslavia) Milan Bjegojević	1960–1970	242
4	(Socialist Federal Republic of Yugoslavia) Nebojša Popović	1946–1957	184
5	(Socialist Federal Republic of Yugoslavia) Bratislav Đorđević	1971–1973; 1976–1979	148
5	(Serbia and Montenegro) Vladislav Lučić	1992–1994; 1997–1998; 1999–2000	148
7	(Socialist Federal Republic of Yugoslavia) Zoran Slavnić	1988–1991; 1994–1995	143
8	(Greece) Ioannis Sfairopoulos	2023–present	142
9	(Serbia) Aleksandar Trifunović	2002–2003; 2004–2005; 2009–2010	139
10	(Serbia) Dragan Šakota	2005–2007; 2019–2020	137
11	(Serbia) Stevan Karadžić	2000–2001; 2007–2008	111
12	(Serbia) Svetislav Pešić	2008–2009; 2011–2012	106

Last updated on: July 6, 2025

=== Most points scored ===
List of players who have scored more than 4,000 points for Crvena zvezda in all competitions.

No	Player	Position	Period	PS
1	(Socialist Federal Republic of Yugoslavia) Dragan Kapičić	SF	1965–1977	6,197
2	(Socialist Federal Republic of Yugoslavia) Vladimir Cvetković	F/C	1959–1972	5,983
3	(Socialist Federal Republic of Yugoslavia) Slobodan Nikolić	SG	1975–1987; 1989–1991	5,469
4	(Serbia and Montenegro) Nebojša Ilić	SG	1985–1993; 1995–1997	4,779
5	(Socialist Federal Republic of Yugoslavia) Dragiša Vučinić	C	1967–1979	4,685
6	(Socialist Federal Republic of Yugoslavia) Ljubodrag Simonović	SG	1967–1976	4,461
7	(Socialist Federal Republic of Yugoslavia) Predrag Bogosavljev	C	1976–1989	4,418
8	(Serbia) Ognjen Dobrić	SG/SF	2016–2023; 2024–present	4,076
9	(Socialist Federal Republic of Yugoslavia) Zoran Slavnić	PG	1967–1977	4,067
10	(Serbia) Igor Rakočević	SG	1994–2000; 2003–2004; 2012–2013	4,007

=== Most points scored in a game ===
Competition	Player	Position	PS	Opponent	Date
Regular season	(Serbia and Montenegro) Nebojša Ilić	SG	71	Vojvodina	21 November 1992
Playoffs	(Serbia) Milan Gurović	SF	40	Partizan	2006–07 season
Adriatic League	(Serbia) Milan Gurović	SF	55	FMP	30 September 2006
National Cup	(Serbia and Montenegro) Nebojša Ilić	SG	42	Big Enex	1992–93 season
Eternal derby	(Socialist Federal Republic of Yugoslavia) Ljubodrag Simonović	SG	59	Partizan	1975–76 season
European competition	(Socialist Federal Republic of Yugoslavia) Nebojša Ilić	SG	43	Estudiantes Todagrés	1987–88 Korać Cup

=== In a game ===
- Largest margin of victory in a game – 114 (Score: 118–4); a 1946 Belgrade Championship game with Kosmaj Mladenovac, 1 June 1946
- Largest margin of defeat in a game – 54 (Score: 140–86); a 1963 season road game with Olimpija
- Most points scored – 150 (Score: 116–150); a 1990–91 season road game with Napredak Aleksinac
- Least points scored – 13 (Score: 13–21); a 1949 season home game with Partizan

=== In a season ===
Team

- Most games won in a national championship – 28; 1992–93
- Most games won in all competitions – 67; 2016–17
- Least games lost in a national championship – 0; 1947, 2022–23, 2023–24
- Most games played in all competitions – 84; 2016–17

Player

- Most games played in all competitions – 83; Charles Jenkins, 2016–17
- Most points scored in all competitions – 1,355; Milan Gurović, 2006–07
- Most points scored in a European competition – 502; Jordan Loyd, 2020–21
- Most points per game in a national championship – 34.3; Vladimir Cvetković, 1966

=== In a career ===
- Most seasons played – 14; Slobodan Nikolić, Branko Lazić
- Most trophies won in total – 26; Branko Lazić
- Most national championships won – 9; Srđan Kalember, Milan Bjegojević, Branko Lazić
- Most national cups won – 9; Branko Lazić
- Most Adriatic championships won – 7; Branko Lazić

== NBA ==
=== Players on the NBA draft ===
^{#}	Denotes player who has never appeared in an NBA regular-season or playoff game

Year	Rnd.	Pick	Player	Pos.	Drafted by
2000	2	51	(Serbia and Montenegro) Igor Rakočević	SG	Minnesota Timberwolves
2008	2	53	(Serbia) Tadija Dragićević^{#}	PF	Utah Jazz, traded to Houston Rockets
2010	2	35	(Serbia) Nemanja Bjelica	PF/SF	Washington Wizards, traded to Minnesota Timberwolves
2015	2	60	(Serbia) Luka Mitrović^{#}	PF	Philadelphia 76ers, traded to Sacramento Kings
2017	2	36	(Australia) Jonah Bolden	PF	Philadelphia 76ers
2024	1	12	(Serbia) Nikola Topić^{#}	PG	Oklahoma City Thunder

=== Moved to an NBA team ===
Year	Pos.	Player	Moving to	Ref.
1995	C	(Serbia and Montenegro) Rastko Cvetković	Denver Nuggets	
2015	C	(Serbia) Boban Marjanović	San Antonio Spurs	
2017	PG	(United States) Nate Wolters	Utah Jazz	

== See also ==
- KK Partizan accomplishments and records
