= Salaj =

Salaj or Sălaj may refer to:

- Đuro Salaj (1889–1958), Yugoslav politician
- Ivan Salaj (1961–2020), Serbian basketball player
- Sălaj County, Romania
- Sălaj (river), in Romania
- Sălaj (Bucharest), a quarter of Sector 5, Bucharest, Romania
