= Kyle Gibson (basketball) =

American basketball player (born 1987)

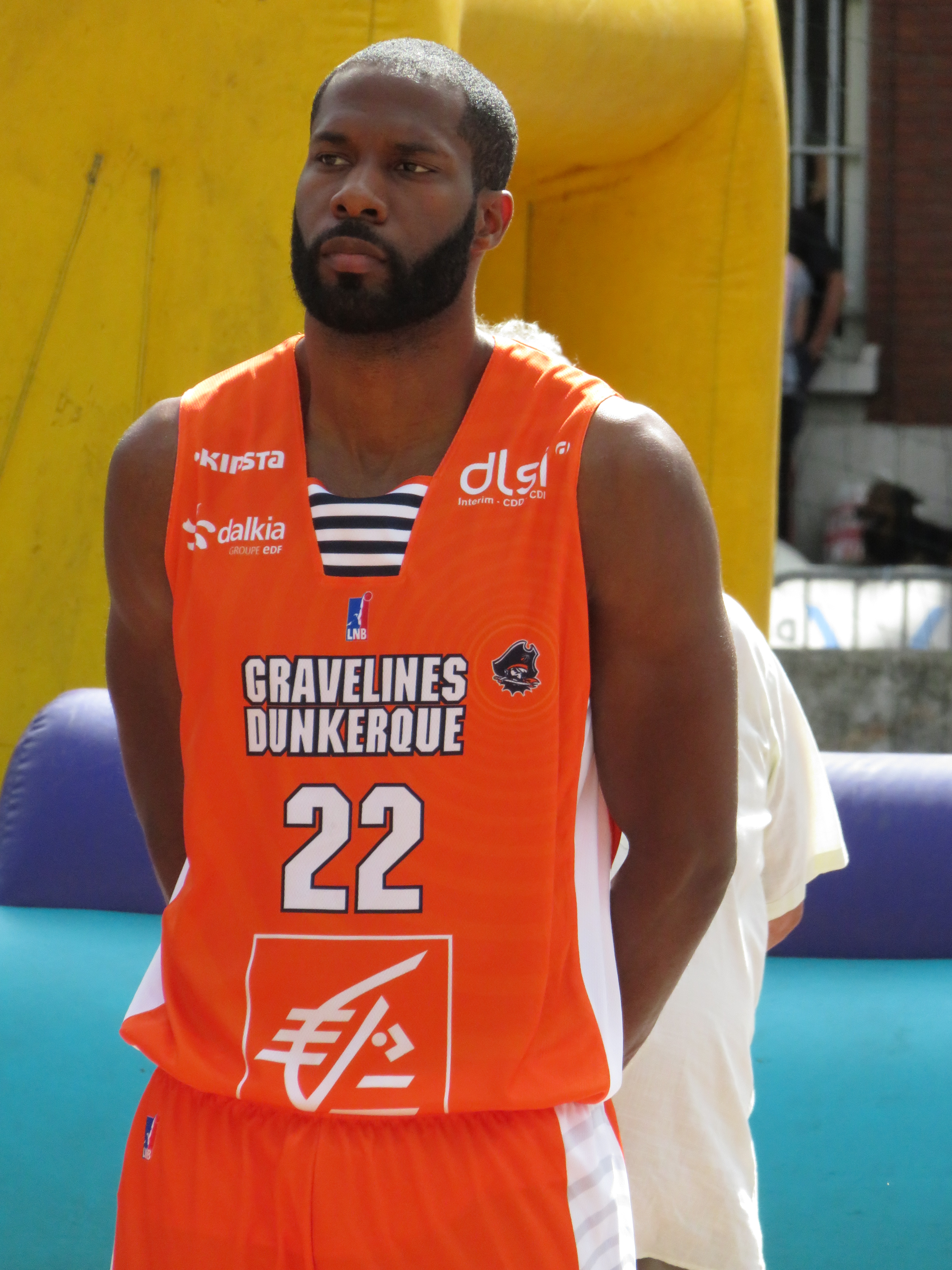
- Gibson with BCM Gravelines-Dunkerque in 2016

Personal information
- Born: May 22, 1987 (age 39) Los Angeles, California, U.S.
- Listed height: 6 ft 4 in (1.93 m)
- Listed weight: 205 lb (93 kg)

Career information
- High school: Susan Miller Dorsey (Los Angeles, California)
- College: Louisiana Tech (2006–2010)
- NBA draft: 2010: undrafted
- Playing career: 2011–2023
- Position: Shooting guard

Career history
- 2011–2013: Canton Charge
- 2013–2014: Pistoia
- 2014–2015: Virtus Roma
- 2015–2016: Oostende
- 2016–2017: BCM Gravelines-Dunkerque
- 2017–2018: Budućnost
- 2018–2019: Beşiktaş
- 2019–2020: Boulazac Basket Dordogne
- 2020–2021: Śląsk Wrocław
- 2021: Brujos de Guayama
- 2021–2022: Hapoel Galil Elyon
- 2023: Venados de Mazatlán

Career highlights
- ABA League champion (2018); Belgian League champion (2016); Belgian Cup winner (2016); Montenegrin Cup winner (2018)
- Stats at Basketball Reference

Kyle Edward Gibson (born May 22, 1987) is an American professional former basketball player He played college basketball for the Louisiana Tech Bulldogs.

== Biography ==
He played college basketball at Louisiana Tech (2006–2010).

Gibson signed with Budućnost on July 6, 2017. He inked with Beşiktaş on August 28, 2018.

On August 20, 2019, he signed with Boulazac Basket Dordogne of the LNB Pro A. Gibson averaged 11.8 points and 2.6 assists per game. On November 6, 2020, he signed with Śląsk Wrocław of the Polish Basketball League. Gibson joined the Brujos de Guayama in Puerto Rico in 2021, but left the team in August.

On August 21, 2021, he signed with Hapoel Galil Elyon of the Israeli Premier League.

== The Basketball Tournament ==
Kyle Gibson played for Team CitiTeam Blazers in the 2018 edition of The Basketball Tournament. In two games, he averaged 18.5 points per game, 4.5 rebounds per game and 2.0 assists per game. CitiTeam Blazers made it to the Second Round before falling to Team Challenge ALS.
