= Milić Starovlah =

Montenegrin basketball player

No. 17 – Neftçi
- Position: Shooting guard
- League: Azerbaijan Basketball League

Personal information
- Born: 28 January 1998 (age 28) Pljevlja, Montenegro, FR Yugoslavia
- Listed height: 2.00 m (6 ft 7 in)
- Listed weight: 90 kg (198 lb)

Career information
- NBA draft: 2020: undrafted
- Playing career: 2016–present

Career history
- 2016–2017: Lovćen Cetinje
- 2017–2020: Budućnost
- 2020–2022: Studentski centar
- 2022: Szedeák
- 2023: Zlatibor
- 2023–2024: Mornar Bar
- 2024–2025: Šibenka
- 2025–2026: Alba Fehérvár
- 2026–present: Neftçi

Career highlights
- ABA League champion (2018); ABA League Second Division champion (2021); Montenegrin League champion (2019); 3× Montenegrin Cup winner (2018–2020)

Milić Starovlah (born 28 January 1998) is a Montenegrin professional basketball player for Neftçi of the Azerbaijan Basketball League. After a brief spell developing at the Torrejón Basketball Academy in Spain, Starovlah finished his basketball upbringing in the Balkans, where he was a member of the Montenegro national basketball youth team.
