= Aleksa Ilić =

Montenegrin basketball player (born 1996)

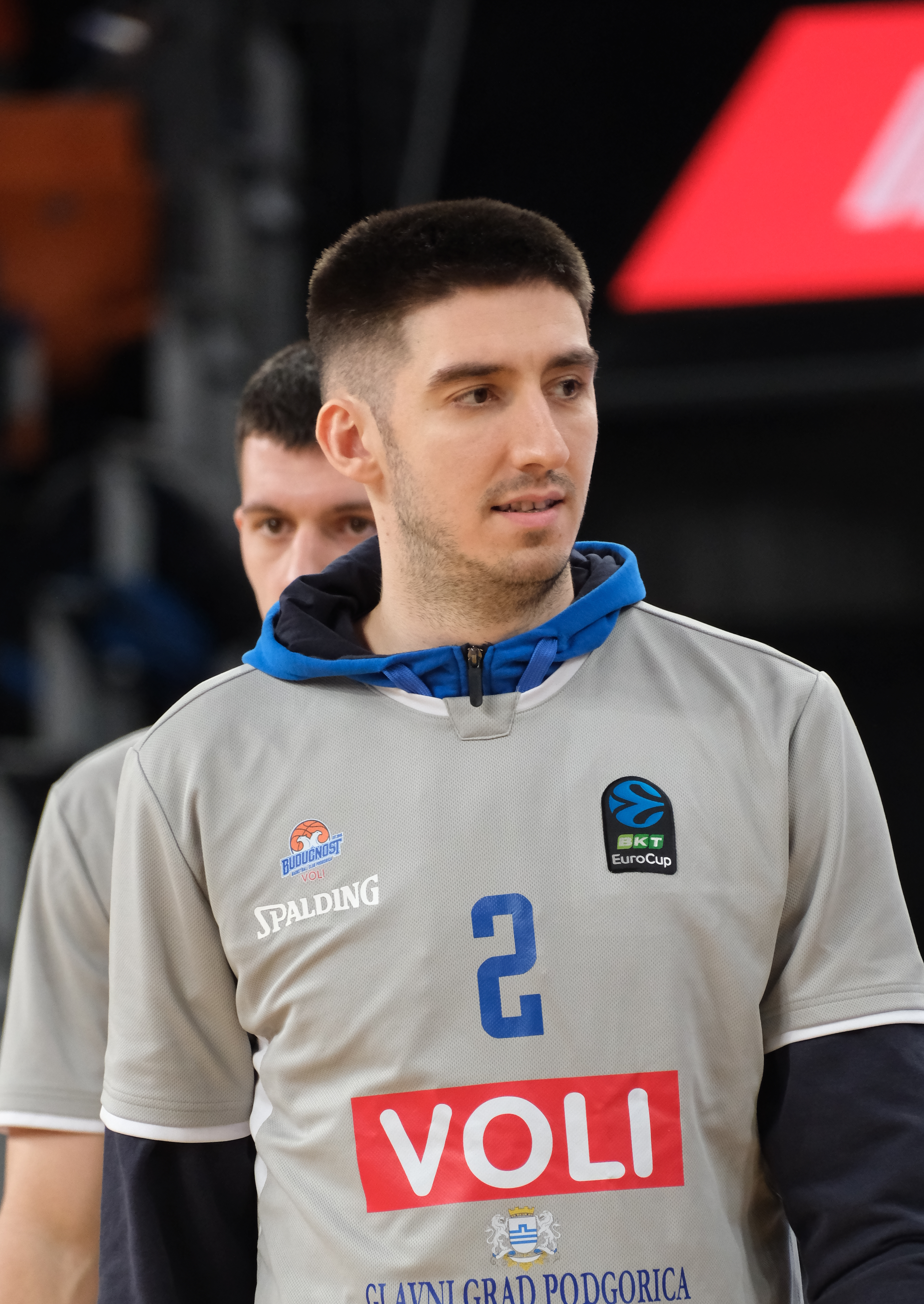
- Ilić with Budućnost in 2025

No. 2 – Río Breogán
- Position: Power forward / center
- League: Liga ACB

Personal information
- Born: September 17, 1996 (age 30) Nikšić, Montenegro, FR Yugoslavia
- Listed height: 2.04 m (6 ft 8 in)
- Listed weight: 98 kg (216 lb)

Career information
- NBA draft: 2018: undrafted
- Playing career: 2012–present

Career history
- 2012–2015: Sutjeska
- 2015–2025: Budućnost
- 2025–2026: KK Studentski centar
- 2026–present: Río Breogán

Career highlights
- ABA League champion (2018); 4× Montenegrin League champion (2017, 2019, 2021, 2023); 7× Montenegrin Cup winner (2017–2021, 2023, 2025)
Medals
Representing Montenegro
Men's basketball
Games of the Small States of Europe
Silver medal – second place	2017 San Marino	National Team

Aleksa Ilić (born September 17, 1996) is a Montenegrin professional basketball player for Río Breogán of the Liga ACB. He previously played for Budućnost and Studentski centar.

== Professional career ==
On June 12, 2026, he signed with Río Breogán of the Liga ACB, having previously played for Budućnost and Studentski centar in his native Montenegro.
