= Ivan Salaj =

Serbian basketball player (1961–2020)

Personal information
- Born: 10 May 1961 Sremska Mitrovica, Serbia, Yugoslavia
- Died: 6 January 2020 (aged 58) Sremska Mitrovica, Serbia
- Listed height: 2.04 m (6 ft 8 in)

Career information
- NBA draft: 1983: undrafted
- Playing career: 1977–1999
- Position: Power forward / center
- Number: 12, 13

Career history
- 1977–1978: 25. Maj
- 1978–1983: Crvena zvezda
- 1983–1990: Borovo
- 1990–1997: 25. Maj / Srem
- 1997–1999: Mitrovčani

Ivan Salaj (Serbian Cyrillic: Иван Салај; 10 May 1961 – 6 January 2020) was a Serbian professional basketball player.

== Playing career ==
A power forward, Salaj played 22 seasons in Yugoslavia from 1977 to 1999. During his playing days, he played for KK 25. Maj (Srem from the 1990s) on two occasions, Crvena zvezda, Borovo, and Mitrovčani. He retired as a player with his hometown club Mitrovčani in 1999.

During his tenure with Crvena zveda of the Yugoslav Federal League from 1978 to 1983, he was a part of the talented cast along with Slobodan Nikolić, Predrag Bogosavljev, Zufer Avdija, Boban Janković, Stevan Karadžić, and Branko Kovačević. Over 119 games in 5 seasons with the Zvezda, he averaged 2.4 points per game.

== See also ==
- List of KK Crvena zvezda players with 100 games played
