= Kyle Landry =

Canadian basketball player

Calgary Surge
- Title: Assistant coach
- League: CEBL

Personal information
- Born: April 4, 1986 (age 40) Calgary, Alberta
- Listed height: 6 ft 9 in (2.06 m)
- Listed weight: 240 lb (109 kg)

Career information
- High school: Bishop Grandin (Calgary, Alberta)
- College: Northern Arizona (2004–2008)
- NBA draft: 2008: undrafted
- Playing career: 2008–2020
- Position: Power forward

Career history

Playing
- 2008–2009: Sportino Inowrocław
- 2009: Dexia Mons-Hainaut
- 2009–2011: Prostějov
- 2011–2017: Triumph Lyubertsy / Zenit Saint Petersburg
- 2017–2018: Budućnost VOLI
- 2020: Ottawa Blackjacks

Coaching
- 2023–present: Calgary Surge (assistant)

Career highlights
- ABA League champion (2018); Montenegrin Cup winner (2018); First-team All-Big Sky (2008)

Kyle Landry (born April 4, 1986) is a Canadian former professional basketball player currently working as an assistant coach for the Calgary Surge of the Canadian Elite Basketball League (CEBL). He played college basketball for Northern Arizona and also represented the senior Canadian national basketball team.

== College career ==
Landry played NCAA Division I college basketball at Northern Arizona University. He saw extensive action in all four years with the Lumberjacks, and averaged a team-leading 17.5 points and 8.1 rebounds per game, in his senior season (2007–08) for the team.

== Professional career ==
After college, Landry signed with Polish side Sportino Inowrocław. In his only season with the club, 2008–09, he averaged 12.1 points and 10 rebounds per game. He was named to the All-Polish League First Team and also participated in the league's All-Star Game. At the end of the season, he signed with Belgian side Dexia Mons-Hainaut for two months and helped the team to a second-place finish in the Basketball League Belgium.

For the 2009–10 season, Landry signed with Prostějov of the Czech National Basketball League. In July 2011, he signed with Triumph Lyubertsy in Russia. He re-signed after the 2013–14 season, and moved with the team to Saint Petersburg, and became a player of the new club Zenit St. Petersburg. In June 2017, he parted ways with Zenit.

On August 1, 2017, Landry signed with the Montenegrin Adriatic League club Budućnost VOLI.

On June 23, 2020, Landry signed with the Ottawa Blackjacks of the Canadian Elite Basketball League (CEBL).

== National team career ==
Landry first played with the senior Canada men's national basketball team at the 2009 Marchand Continental Championship Cup. At the Marchand Cup, he scored two points, and grabbed seven rebounds, in his only action of the tournament, against Argentina. He also played with the Canadian senior team at the 2009 FIBA Americas Championship, where he provided support off the bench, for the fourth-place finish Canadians. With the fourth-place finish, the Canadians qualified for the 2010 FIBA World Championship.
