= Predrag Bogosavljev =

Serbian basketball player and executive

Personal information
- Born: 27 June 1959 (age 67) Kikinda, PR Serbia, FPR Yugoslavia
- Listed height: 2.05 m (6 ft 9 in)

Career information
- NBA draft: 1981: undrafted
- Playing career: 1976–1994
- Position: Power forward / center
- Number: 10, 12

Career history
- 1976–1989: Crvena zvezda
- 1989–1990: Vevey Riviera Basket
- 1990–1991: Rabotnički
- 1991–1994: OKK Beograd

Career highlights
- Yugoslav Cup winner (1993)
Medals
Men's basketball
Representing Yugoslavia
European Championship for Juniors
| Bronze medal – third place | 1978 Italy | Team |
| Gold medal – first place | 1976 Spain | Team |

Predrag Bogosavljev (Serbian Cyrillic: Предраг Богосављев; born June 27, 1959) is a Serbian basketball executive and former player.

== Playing career ==
Bogosavljev played for the Crvena zvezda of the Yugoslav First League from 1976–1989. He is ranked 3rd for most games played (423), behind Branko Lazic and Slobodan Nikolić, and 7th for the most points scored (4,350) in the history of Crvena zvezda. He also played for the OKK Beograd with whom he won the Yugoslav Cup in 1993.

== National team career ==
Bogosavljev was a member of the Yugoslavia national junior team that won the gold medal at the 1976 European Championship for Juniors in Spain. Over seven tournament games, he averaged 8 points per game. Also, he won the bronze medal at the 1978 European Championship for Juniors in Italy where he averaged 13.8 points per game.

== Post-playing career ==
Bogosavljev was long-time secretary-general of the Basketball Federation of Yugoslavia and the Basketball Federation of Serbia and Montenegro. Later, he became the Sport and Competitions Director of FIBA.

== Personal life ==
Bogosavljev earned his bachelor's degree in mechanical engineering from the University of Belgrade in 1984.

== See also ==
- List of KK Crvena zvezda players with 100 games played
- KK Crvena zvezda accomplishments and records

Sporting positions
| First | Secretary General of the Basketball Federation of Serbia; 2006–2007 | Succeeded by Predrag Bojić |
