= Strahinja Mićović =

Serbian basketball player

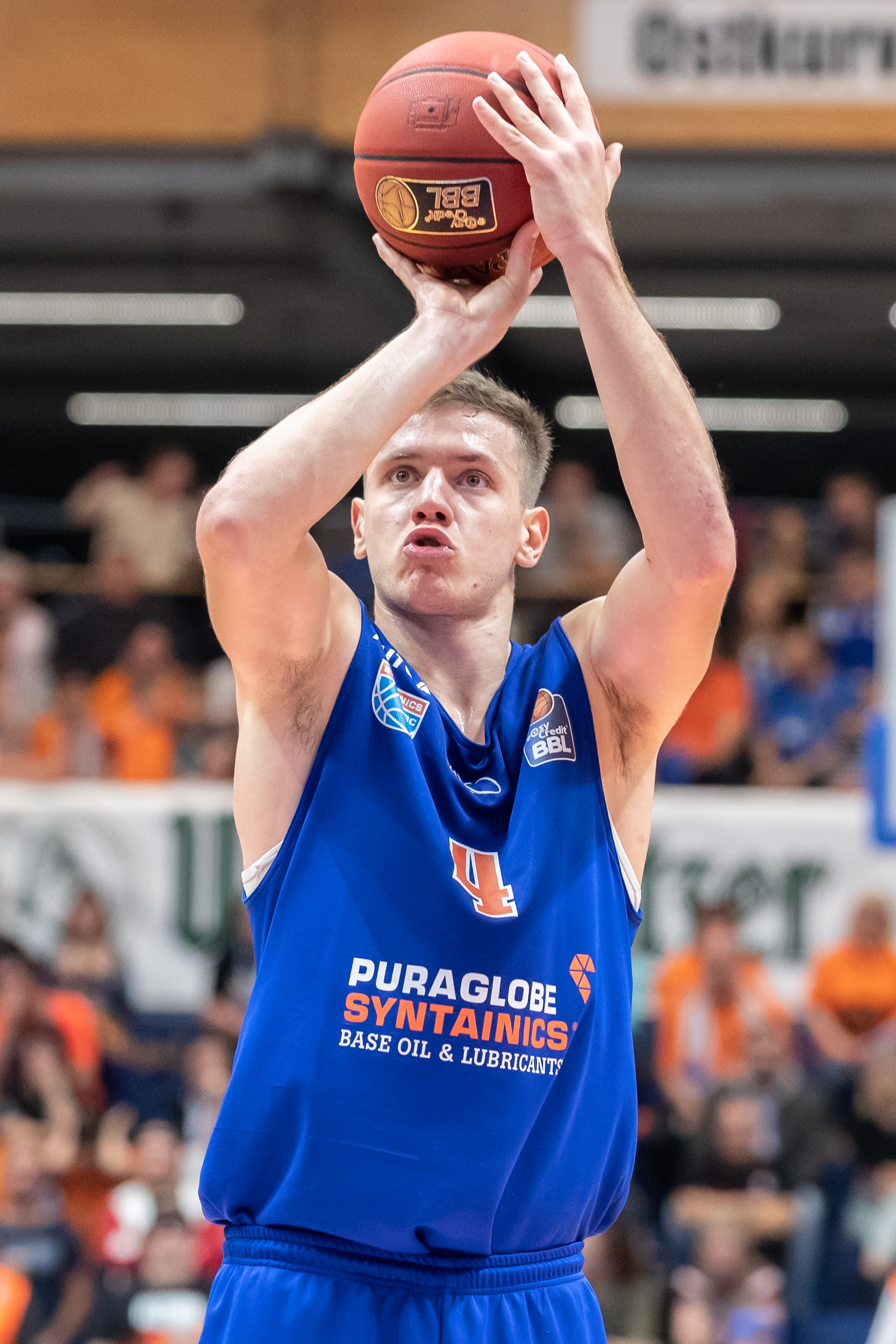
- Mićović with Mitteldeutscher in 2019

No. 7 – Básquet Coruña
- Position: Power forward
- League: LEB Oro

Personal information
- Born: 17 June 1992 (age 34) Belgrade, FR Yugoslavia
- Listed height: 2.05 m (6 ft 9 in)
- Listed weight: 105 kg (231 lb)

Career information
- NBA draft: 2014: undrafted
- Playing career: 2011–present

Career history
- 2011–2013: Radnički Beograd
- 2013–2014: OKK Beograd
- 2015: FMP
- 2015–2016: Borac Čačak
- 2016–2017: Igokea
- 2017–2019: Mornar
- 2019–2020: Mitteldeutscher
- 2020–2021: Telekom Baskets Bonn
- 2021–2022: Mornar
- 2022–2023: MZT Skopje
- 2023–2024: CBet Jonava
- 2024–2025: Monbus Obradoiro
- 2025-2026: Kazma SC
- 2026-present: Básquet Coruña

Career highlights
- Macedonian League champion (2023); Macedonian Cup winner (2023); Montenegrin League champion (2018); Bosnian League champion (2017); Bosnian Cup winner (2017)

Strahinja Mićović (Serbian Cyrillic: Страхиња Мићовић, born 17 June 1992) is a Serbian professional basketball player.

== Professional career ==
Mićović spent the first three years of his career with BKK Radnički and OKK Beograd. He also had an unsuccessful trial at Partizan NIS during the 2013 pre-season.

Mićović signed with FMP coached by Milan Gurović after a successful trial which took place during the 2014 pre-season. For the 2015–16 season, he moved to Borac Čačak. On 16 July 2016, Mićović signed a 1+1 deal with Bosnian team Igokea. On 1 July 2017, Mićović signed with Mornar Bar of the Montenegrin League.

On 24 July 2019, Mićović signed with Mitteldeutscher BC of the Basketball Bundesliga. He averaged 13.0 points and 4.5 rebounds per game. On 13 August 2020, Mićović signed with Telekom Baskets Bonn.

On 20 July 2021, Mićović returned to Mornar Bar.

On 26 August 2023, Mićović signed with CBet Jonava of the Lithuanian Basketball League (LKL).

On 23 July 2024, Mićović signed with Monbus Obradoiro of the Primera FEB.
