= Filip Barović =

Montenegrin basketball player

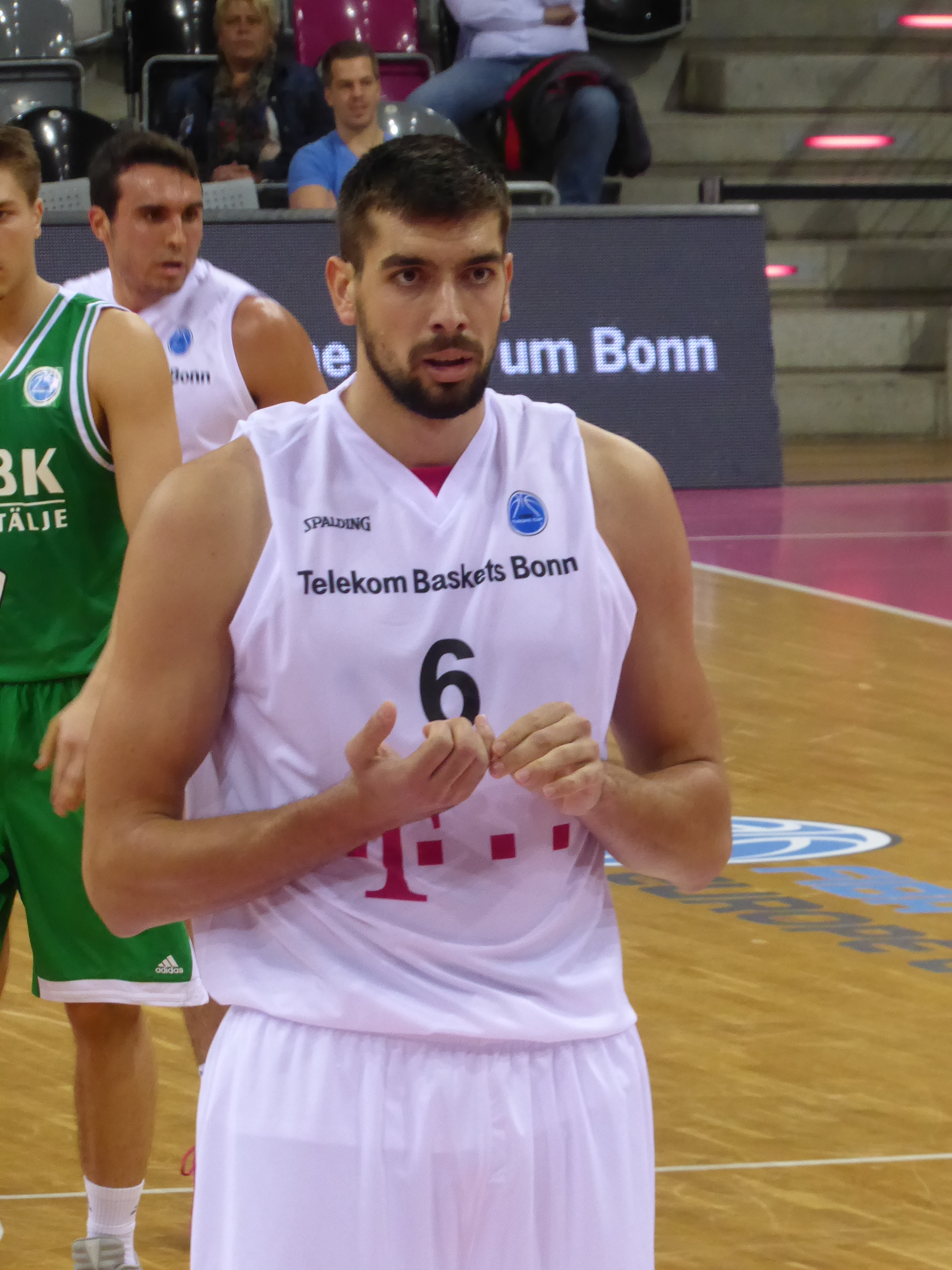

No. 6 – Sutjeska Elektroprivreda
- Position: Power forward / center
- League: Aba Second League

Personal information
- Born: 29 July 1990 (age 36) Nikšić, SR Montenegro, SFR Yugoslavia
- Listed height: 6 ft 10 in (2.08 m)
- Listed weight: 251 lb (114 kg)

Career information
- NBA draft: 2012: undrafted
- Playing career: 2009–present

Career history
- 2009–2011: Budućnost
- 2011–2012: Mornar
- 2012–2014: Sopron
- 2014–2015: Kecskemét
- 2015–2016: Academic Sofia
- 2016–2017: Bonn
- 2017–2020: Budućnost
- 2021: Studentski centar
- 2021–2022: Budućnost
- 2022–present: Rapid București

Career highlights
- ABA League champion (2018); ABA League Second Division champion (2021); Bulgarian League champion (2016); 4× Montenegrin League champion (2010,20112019, 2022); 5× Montenegrin Cup winner (2010,2011, 2018, 2019, 2022)

Filip Barović (born 29 July 1990) is a Montenegrin professional basketball player for Sutjeska of the Montenegrin League.

Barović played for Budućnost VOLI.
