= Aleksandar Todorov =

Macedonian basketball coach

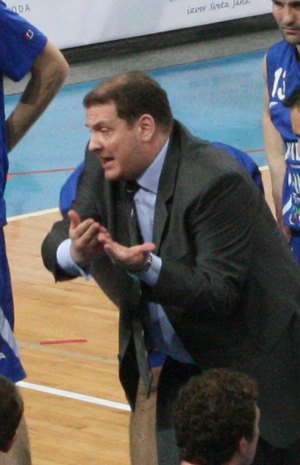
- Todorov with MZT Skopje Aerodrom in 2011

Personal information
- Born: July 17, 1973 (age 53) Skopje, SR Macedonia, SFR Yugoslavia

Career information
- High school: Haltom High School

Career history
- 1996–2000: Alumina
- 2000–2001: MZT Skopje
- 2001–2002: Kumanovo
- 2002–2003: Vardar
- 2004–2005: FON Univerzitet
- 2005–2007: Ankara Basketbol Kulübü
- 2007: MZT Skopje
- 2008–2011: Rilski Sportist
- 2011–2012: MZT Skopje
- 2012–2015: Balkan Botevgrad
- 2015–2016: Dinamo București
- 2016–2017: KB Peja
- 2017: MZT Skopje
- 2018: Levski Lukoil Sofia
- 2018–2021: SCM U Craiova
- 2019–2021: N. Macedonia National Team
- 2021-2025: Landstede Hammers Zwolle (General Manager)

Career highlights
- Macedonian First League (2012); Bulgarian First League (2018); 2x Macedonian Basketball Cup (2001, 2012); Balkan International Basketball League (2009, 2018)

Aleksandar Todorov (Macedonian: Александар Тодоров; born July 17, 1973) is a former Macedonian basketball coach, who works as a General manager since 2021. He was the head coach of MZT Skopje, when they won the title for the first time in their history, and won the first game ever for a Macedonian team in Adriatic League. In addition to his Macedonian citizenship, Todorov also holds Bulgarian citizenship.

== Club titles ==
- Macedonian Cup: 2 (2001, 2012)
- BIBL: 1 (2009)
- Macedonian First League: 1 (2012)
