= KK Crvena zvezda in international competitions =

KK Crvena zvezda history and statistics in FIBA Europe and Euroleague Basketball (company) competitions.

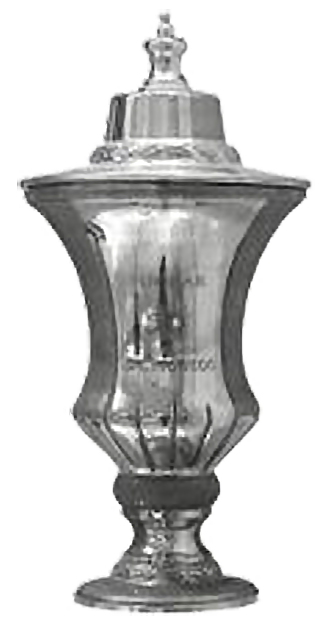

== European competitions ==
Record	Round	Opponent club					
1969–70 FIBA European Champions Cup 1st–tier
4–6	1st round	(Luxembourg) Sparta Bertrange	112–92 a	129–84 h			
4–6	2nd round	(Greece) Panathinaikos	91–66 h	75–83 a			
4–6	QF	(Soviet Union) CSKA Moscow	82–85 h	92–105 a			
4–6	QF	(France) ASVEL	76–75 h	73–75 a			
4–6	QF	(Italy) Ignis Varese	65–99 a	74–75 h			
1971–72 FIBA European Cup Winner's Cup 2nd–tier
7–4	1st round	(Finland) Helsingin Kisa-Toverit	95–62 h	101–77 a			
7–4	2nd round	(Austria) Handelsministerium	97–90 a	108–68 h			
7–4	QF	(Greece) AEK	100–63 h	76–100 a			
7–4	QF	(Italy) Simmenthal Milano	62–86 a	84–58 h			
7–4	SF	(Spain) Juventud Schweppes	70–83 a	90–70 h			
7–4	F	(Italy) Simmenthal Milano	70–74; March 21, Alexandreio Melathron, Thessaloniki				
1972–73 FIBA European Champions Cup 1st–tier
6–6	1st round	(Netherlands) Levi's Flamingo's	72–88 a	107–74 h			
6–6	2nd round	(Albania) Partizani Tirana	94–83 a	99–74 h			
6–6	QF	(Israel) Maccabi Tel Aviv	102–113 a	103–88 h			
6–6	QF	(Spain) Real Madrid	77–74 a	80–70 h			
6–6	QF	(Italy) Simmenthal Milano	85–108 a	74–80 h			
6–6	SF	(Soviet Union) CSKA Moscow	90–98 h	83–100 a			
1973–74 FIBA European Cup Winner's Cup 2nd–tier
9–2	1st round	(Albania) 17 Nëntori Tirana	99–93 a	114–70 h			
9–2	2nd round	(France) Alsace Bagnolet	92–94 a	102–86 h			
9–2	QF	(Bulgaria) CSKA Septemvriisko zname	81–88 a	80–72 h			
9–2	QF	(Italy) Saclà Asti	93–86 h	88–87 a			
9–2	SF	(Spain) Estudiantes Monteverde	79–74 a	104–85 h			
9–2	F	(Czechoslovakia) Spartak ZJŠ Brno	86–75; April 2, Palasport Primo Carnera, Udine				
1974–75 FIBA European Cup Winner's Cup 2nd–tier
5–4	2nd round	Bye	Crvena zvezda qualified without games				
5–4	QF	(Belgium) Racing Thorens Antwerpen	94–98 a	116–89 h			
5–4	QF	(Bulgaria) CSKA Septemvriisko zname	75–72 a	102–91 h			
5–4	QF	(Spain) Juventud Schweppes	97–79 h	63–78 a			
5–4	SF	(Socialist Federal Republic of Yugoslavia) Jugoplastika	76–88 a	81–63 h			
5–4	F	(Soviet Union) Spartak Leningrad	62–63; March 26, Palais des Sports de Beaulieu, Nantes				
1980–81 FIBA Korać Cup 3rd–tier
6–4	2nd round	(Greece) Sporting	85–63 h	72–69 a			
6–4	Top 16	(Belgium) Anderlecht	86–79 a	90–91 h			
6–4	Top 16	(Italy) Ferrarelle Rieti	93–80 h	92–88 a			
6–4	Top 16	(Israel) Hapoel Tel Aviv	92–96 a	128–102 h			
6–4	SF	(Spain) Joventut Freixenet	85–109 a	73–82 h			
1981–82 FIBA Korać Cup 3rd–tier
5–3	2nd round	Bye	Crvena zvezda qualified without games				
5–3	Top 16	(Turkey) Efes Pilsen	90–81 a	103–82 h			
5–3	Top 16	(France) Tours	106–93 h	98–106 a			
5–3	Top 16	(Italy) Latte Sole Bologna	82–84 a	91–79 h			
5–3	SF	(Socialist Federal Republic of Yugoslavia) Šibenka	115–99 h	83–101 a			
1982–83 FIBA Korać Cup 3rd–tier
6–4	1st round	(Turkey) Tofaş	96–80 a	128–101 h			
6–4	2nd round	(Italy) Carrera Venezia	78–91 a	95–69 h			
6–4	Top 16	(France) Limoges	78–80 a	93–83 h			
6–4	Top 16	(Italy) Banco di Roma Virtus	77–89 a	97–107 h			
6–4	Top 16	(Czechoslovakia) Nová huť Ostrava	95–66 h	88–84 a			
1983–84 FIBA Korać Cup 3rd–tier
8–3	2nd round	(Belgium) Binet Verviers-Pepinster	95–89 a	89–73 h			
8–3	Top 16	(France) Moderne	82–79 a	93–84 h			
8–3	Top 16	(Italy) Intesit Caserta	99–89 h	83–97 a			
8–3	Top 16	(Turkey) Eczacıbaşı	92–84 a	104–94 h			
8–3	SF	(Spain) CAI Zaragoza	130–100 h	87–108 a			
8–3	F	(France) Orthez	73–97; March 15, Palais des sports Pierre-de-Coubertin, Paris				
1984–85 FIBA Korać Cup 3rd–tier
5–3	2nd round	Bye	Crvena zvezda qualified without games				
5–3	Top 16	(Spain) Licor 43	104–102 a	100–84 h			
5–3	Top 16	(Italy) Jollycolombani Cantù	89–102 a	100–83 h			
5–3	Top 16	(Israel) Hapoel Haifa	112–75 h	88–80 a			
5–3	SF	(Italy) Simac Milano	86–109 a	99–100 h			
1985–86 FIBA Korać Cup 3rd–tier
4–2	2nd round	Bye	Crvena zvezda qualified without games				
4–2	Top 16	(France) ASVEL	87–97 a	105–83 h			
4–2	Top 16	(Italy) Divarese Varese	83–101 a	90–83 h			
4–2	Top 16	(Spain) Breogán	102–91 a	117–94 h			
1987–88 FIBA Korać Cup 3rd–tier
7–3	2nd round	(Turkey) Beşiktaş	104–80 a	114–75 h			
7–3	Top 16	(France) ASVEL	91–83 h	87–95 a			
7–3	Top 16	(Greece) PAOK	93–88 a	93–88 h			
7–3	Top 16	(Spain) Estudiantes Todagrés	115–98 h	103–65 a			
7–3	SF	(Spain) Real Madrid	82–89 h	72–81 a			
1988–89 FIBA Korać Cup 3rd–tier
6–4	1st round	(Turkey) Fenerbahçe	101–64 h	87–79 a			
6–4	2nd round	(Greece) PAOK	85–95 a	86–76 h			
6–4	Top 16	(Belgium) Maes Pils	101–88 a	83–76 h			
6–4	Top 16	(Italy) Philips Milano	81–101 a	80–90 h			
6–4	Top 16	(Spain) CAI Zaragoza	92–89 h	61–97 a			
1989–90 FIBA Korać Cup 3rd–tier
1–1	1st round	(Greece) Iraklis	81–99 a	77–62 h			
1990–91 FIBA European Cup Winner's Cup 2nd–tier
3–5	Top 16	(Turkey) Paşabahçe	85–94 a	86–76 h			
3–5	QF	(Israel) Hapoel Galil Elyon	92–115 a	108–101 h			
3–5	QF	(Greece) PAOK	80–91 a	91–75 h			
3–5	QF	(Spain) CAI Zaragoza	109–113 h	113–134 a			
1992–93 FIBA European League 1st–tier
–	2nd round	(Greece) PAOK	Crvena zvezda qualified without games				
1995–96 FIBA Korać Cup 3rd–tier
1–1	1st round	(Russia) Aqvarius Volgograd	67–74 a	78–76 h			
1996–97 FIBA Korać Cup 3rd–tier
6–4	1st round	(Bulgaria) Kompact Dimitrovgrad	83–69 h	87–66 a			
6–4	2nd round	(Poland) Komfort Stargard Szczeciński	92–64 h	70–58 a			
6–4	2nd round	(Spain) Cáceres	90–93 h	77–85 a			
6–4	2nd round	(Russia) Spartak Saint Petersburg	101–85 a	90–83 h			
6–4	3rd round	(Greece) PAOK	99–102 h	87–100 a			
1997–98 FIBA Korać Cup 3rd–tier
13–5	1st round	(Cyprus) Panathinaikos Limassol	90–54 h	89–77 a			
13–5	2nd round	(Austria) Mountain Kapfenberg	104–87 a	86–59 h			
13–5	2nd round	(Israel) Bnei Herzliya	92–71 h	72–71 a			
13–5	2nd round	(Greece) Nikas Peristeri	82–60 a	77–83 h			
13–5	3rd round	(Italy) Fontanafredda Siena	72–81 a	91–73 h			
13–5	Top 16	(Turkey) Darüşşafaka	67–62 h	81–77 a			
13–5	QF	(Turkey) Kombassan Konya	81–66 h	63–67 a			
13–5	SF	(France) Cholet	81–49 h	74–96 a			
13–5	F	(Italy) Riello Mash Verona	74–68, March 25, PalaOlimpia, Verona; 64–73, April 1, Pionir Hall, Belgrade				
1998–99 FIBA EuroLeague 1st–tier
4–12	1st round	(Croatia) Cibona	66–69 h	80–77 a			
4–12	1st round	(Greece) Panathinaikos	71–77 a	74–76 h			
4–12	1st round	(Turkey) Efes Pilsen	60–73 a	71–72 h			
4–12	1st round	(Israel) Maccabi Tel Aviv	67–70 h	59–78 a			
4–12	1st round	(Spain) TDK Manresa	59–74 a	88–60 h			
4–12	2nd round	(Lithuania) Žalgiris	77–69 h	65–91 a			
4–12	2nd round	(France) Pau-Orthez	61–70 a	75–85 h			
4–12	2nd round	(Turkey) Fenerbahçe	88–66 h	61–78 a			
1999–00 FIBA EuroLeague 1st–tier
2–14	1st round	(Greece) PAOK	65–64 h	53–82 a			
2–14	1st round	(Russia) CSKA Moscow	62–86 a	65–80 h			
2–14	1st round	(Italy) Benetton Treviso	63–88 a	60–70 h			
2–14	1st round	(Spain) FC Barcelona	86–91 h	67–90 a			
2–14	1st round	(France) Cholet	59–69 a	56–64 h			
2–14	2nd round	(Greece) Panathinaikos	61–76 h	58–67 a			
2–14	2nd round	(Spain) Real Madrid	78–98 a	71–96 h			
2–14	2nd round	(Slovenia) Union Olimpija	83–77 h	47–59 a			
2000–01 FIBA Saporta Cup 2nd–tier
5–7	1st round	(Cyprus) Keravnos Keo	79–93 a	95–84 h			
5–7	1st round	(Germany) Telekom Baskets Bonn	94–89 h	75–83 a			
5–7	1st round	(Spain) Caja San Fernando	81–79 a	80–76 h			
5–7	1st round	(France) Racing Paris	66–68 h	61–65 a			
5–7	1st round	(Lithuania) Sakalai	69–68 h	84–85 a			
5–7	Top 16	(Belgium) Telindus Racing Antwerpen	89–93 h	00–20 a			
2003–04 ULEB Cup 2nd–tier
5–5	Regular season	(Belgium) Spirou	89–81 h	77–84 a			
5–5	Regular season	(France) Gravelines-Dunkerque	78–75 a	81–62 h			
5–5	Regular season	(Spain) Etosa Alicante	87–89 h	81–78 a			
5–5	Regular season	(Italy) Metis Varese	84–93 a	85–76 h			
5–5	Regular season	(Latvia) Ventspils	82–84 h	75–93 a			
2004–05 ULEB Cup 2nd–tier
5–5	Regular season	(Italy) Pompea Napoli	75–69 h	81–83 a			
5–5	Regular season	(Germany) Telekom Baskets Bonn	89–92 a	84–67 h			
5–5	Regular season	(Poland) Deichmann Śląsk Wrocław	81–88 h	73–74 a			
5–5	Regular season	(Portugal) Benfica	106–66 a	83–69 h			
5–5	Regular season	(Lithuania) Lietuvos rytas	89–85 h	60–77 a			
2005–06 ULEB Cup 2nd–tier
6–8	Regular season	(Russia) Dynamo Moscow	77–83 a	80–86 h			
6–8	Regular season	(France) Le Mans	85–73 h	79–70 a			
6–8	Regular season	(Germany) Deutsche Bank Skyliners	89–62 a	91–57 h			
6–8	Regular season	(Italy) Lottomatica Roma	89–72 h	88–94 a			
6–8	Regular season	(Israel) Hapoel Migdal Jerusalem	77–103 a	82–94 h			
6–8	Top 16	(Bulgaria) Lukoil Academic	91–71 h	82–85 a			
6–8	QF	(Russia) Dynamo Moscow	86–87 h	65–86 a			
2006–07 ULEB Cup 2nd–tier
9–5	Regular season	(Greece) PAOK	78–68 a	81–85 h			
9–5	Regular season	(Russia) UNICS	87–84 h	72–94 a			
9–5	Regular season	(Spain) Real Madrid	100–81 h	58–84 a			
9–5	Regular season	(Belgium) Dexia Mons-Hainaut	81–70 a	96–69 h			
9–5	Regular season	(Netherlands) EiffelTowers EBBC	90–82 h	92–89 a			
9–5	Top 16	(Russia) Khimki	89–77 h	93–76 a			
9–5	QF	(Spain) Real Madrid	72–83 h	78–79 a			
2007–08 ULEB Cup 2nd–tier
8–5 +1 draw	Regular season	(Czech Republic) ČEZ Nymburk	94–87 a	74–96 h			
8–5 +1 draw	Regular season	(Greece) Panellinios	79–69 h	83–81 a			
8–5 +1 draw	Regular season	(Russia) Dynamo Moscow	76–97 a	98–104 h			
8–5 +1 draw	Regular season	(Italy) Beghelli Bologna	99–66 h	77–76 a			
8–5 +1 draw	Regular season	(Belgium) Telindus Oostende	73–72 a	86–100 h			
8–5 +1 draw	Top 32	(Italy) Benetton Treviso	81–71 h	83–82 a			
8–5 +1 draw	Top 16	(Turkey) Beşiktaş Cola Turka	80–80 h	69–81 a			
2008–09 Eurocup 2nd–tier
7–6 +1 draw	2nd round	(Austria) Allianz Swans Gmunden	82–82 a	96–81 h			
7–6 +1 draw	Regular season	(Belgium) Spirou	65–71 a	93–91 h			
7–6 +1 draw	Regular season	(Germany) Brose Baskets	82–65 h	67–53 a			
7–6 +1 draw	Regular season	(Poland) Turów Zgorzelec	97–69 h	86–76 a			
7–6 +1 draw	Top 16	(Spain) Pamesa Valencia	73–85 h	80–82 a			
7–6 +1 draw	Top 16	(Ukraine) Azovmash	74–62 a	72–95 h			
7–6 +1 draw	Top 16	(Serbia) Hemofarm	73–88 h	65–91 a			
2009–10 Eurocup 2nd–tier
8–4	1st round	Bye	Crvena zvezda qualified without games				
8–4	Regular season	(Russia) Dynamo Moscow	76–67 h	88–86 a			
8–4	Regular season	(Italy) Benetton Treviso	78–71 a	104–83 h			
8–4	Regular season	(France) Cholet	97–69 h	86–76 a			
8–4	Top 16	(Czech Republic) ČEZ Nymburk	65–60 a	55–73 h			
8–4	Top 16	(Spain) Gran Canaria 2014	97–67 h	58–81 a			
8–4	Top 16	(Turkey) Türk Telekom	89–67 a	76–78 h			
2012–13 Eurocup 2nd–tier
7–5	Regular season	(France) Orléans Loiret	93–73 h	85–75 a			
7–5	Regular season	(Spain) Cajasol	95–93 a	70–76 h			
7–5	Regular season	(Italy) Banco di Sardegna Sassari	116–104 h	97–94 a			
7–5	Top 16	(Germany) ratiopharm Ulm	100–95 a	78–92 h			
7–5	Top 16	(Turkey) Galatasaray Medical Park	74–91 h	84–85 a			
7–5	Top 16	(Russia) UNICS	59–78 a	81–73 h			
2013–14 Euroleague 1st–tier
4–6	Regular season	(Russia) Lokomotiv-Kuban	84–87 h	72–79 a			
4–6	Regular season	(Israel) Maccabi Tel Aviv	82–96 a	76–78 h			
4–6	Regular season	(Greece) Panathinaikos	86–90 h	63–69 a			
4–6	Regular season	(Spain) Laboral Kutxa	73–63 a	81–65 h			
4–6	Regular season	(Lithuania) Lietuvos rytas	88–77 h	99–75 a			
2013–14 Eurocup 2nd–tier
7–5	Top 32	(Spain) Bilbao Basket	105–87 h	85–81 a			
7–5	Top 32	(Russia) Nizhny Novgorod	75–86 a	74–78 h			
7–5	Top 32	(Greece) Panionios	84–64 h	78–66 a			
7–5	Top 16	(Lithuania) Lietuvos rytas	88–82 h	80–82 a			
7–5	QF	(Ukraine) Budivelnyk	79–82 a	79–70 h			
7–5	SF	(Russia) UNICS	63–52 h	67–84 a			
2014–15 Euroleague 1st–tier
10–14	Regular season	(Turkey) Galatasaray Liv Hospital	76–68 h	103–110 a			
10–14	Regular season	(Lithuania) Neptūnas	81–83 a	79–62 h			
10–14	Regular season	(Spain) Valencia	76–63 h	77–68 a			
10–14	Regular season	(Greece) Olympiacos	57–62 h	59–64 a			
10–14	Regular season	(Spain) Laboral Kutxa	86–66 a	90–82 h			
10–14	Top 16	(Spain) Real Madrid	72–79 h	61–85 a			
10–14	Top 16	(Israel) Maccabi Tel Aviv	67–78 a	89–76 h			
10–14	Top 16	(Turkey) Galatasaray	65–74 h	91–68 a			
10–14	Top 16	(Spain) FC Barcelona	77–92 a	73–77 h			
10–14	Top 16	(Germany) Alba Berlin	86–69 h	68–73 a			
10–14	Top 16	(Lithuania) Žalgiris	68–70 h	70–76 a			
10–14	Top 16	(Greece) Panathinaikos	69–74 a	69–68 h			
2015–16 Euroleague 1st–tier
12–15	Regular season	(France) SIG	81–59 h	75–78 a			
12–15	Regular season	(Spain) Real Madrid	71–98 a	94–88 h			
12–15	Regular season	(Russia) Khimki	53–91 a	96–91 h			
12–15	Regular season	(Turkey) Fenerbahçe	60–74 h	61–79 a			
12–15	Regular season	(Germany) Bayern Munich	90–79 a	85–76 h			
12–15	Top 16	(Turkey) Anadolu Efes	84–85 a	91–82 h			
12–15	Top 16	(Turkey) Fenerbahçe	65–88 h	65–72 a			
12–15	Top 16	(Greece) Panathinaikos	74–63 a	69–67 h			
12–15	Top 16	(Spain) Unicaja	87–73 h	78–72 a			
12–15	Top 16	(Russia) Lokomotiv-Kuban	80–66 h	62–86 a			
12–15	Top 16	(Turkey) Darüşşafaka Doğuş	66–69 a	61–80 h			
12–15	Top 16	(Croatia) Cedevita	94–74 h	62–83 a			
12–15	QF	(Russia) CSKA Moscow	74–84 a	76–77 a	71–78 h	– h	– a

== Record ==
Crvena zvezda has overall, from 1960 to 1970 (first participation) to 2015–16 (last participation): 201 wins against 180 defeats plus 2 draws in 383 games for all the European club competitions.

- EuroLeague: 42–73 (115)
  - FIBA Saporta Cup: 29–22 (51) /// EuroCup Basketball: 62–48 plus 2 (112)
    - FIBA Korać Cup: 68–37 (105)
