= Marko Mijović =

Montenegrin basketball player

Personal information
- Born: October 5, 1987 (age 39) Bar, SR Montenegro, SFR Yugoslavia
- Listed height: 1.87 m (6 ft 2 in)

Career information
- NBA draft: 2009: undrafted
- Playing career: 2004–present
- Position: Point guard

Career history
- 2004–2008: Mornar Bar
- 2008–2009: Mogren Budva
- 2009–2011: Radnički Obrenovac
- 2011–2013: Teodo Tivat
- 2013–2014: Liria
- 2014: Karpoš Sokoli
- 2014: MBK Baník Handlová
- 2014–2015: Teodo Tivat
- 2015–2019: Mornar Bar
- 2019–2021: Teodo Tivat
- 2021–2022: Jedinstvo Bijelo Polje

Career highlights
- Montenegrin League champion (2018)

Marko Mijović (born October 5, 1987) is a former Montenegrin professional basketball player.
