= 2017–18 ABA League First Division =

ABA League First Division
- Season: 2017–18
- Duration: September 29, 2017–March 12, 2018 (Regular season); March 18, 2018–April 14, 2018 (Playoffs)
- Games played: 142
- Teams: 12
- TV partner: Arena Sport

Regular season
- Top seed: (Serbia) Crvena zvezda mts
- Season MVP: (Croatia) Luka Žorić ^{[1]}
- Promoted: (Slovenia) Krka
- Relegated: (North Macedonia) MZT Skopje Aerodrom

Finals
- Champions: (Montenegro) Budućnost VOLI (1st title)
- Runners-up: (Serbia) Crvena zvezda mts
- Semi-finalists: (Croatia) Cedevita (Montenegro) Mornar
- Finals MVP: (Bosnia and Herzegovina) Nemanja Gordić ^{[2]}

Awards
- Top Prospect: (Bosnia and Herzegovina) Džanan Musa ^{[3]}

Statistical leaders
Points	(Croatia) Luka Žorić	19.71
Rebounds	(Croatia) Luka Božić	7.77
Assists	(Serbia) Filip Čović	7.43
Index Rating	(Croatia) Luka Žorić	23.24

Records
- Biggest home win: Budućnost 104–62 MZT (11 February 2018)
- Biggest away win: MZT 55–96 Olimpija (3 February 2018)
- Highest scoring: Partizan 117–104 Igokea (21 October 2017)
- Highest attendance: 7,237; Crvena zvezda 91–63 Mornar (18 March 2018)
- Lowest attendance: 250; Cibona 79–82 Mornar (4 March 2018)
- All statistics correct as of April 14, 2018.

The 2017–18 ABA League First Division was the 17th season of the ABA League, with 12 teams from Serbia, Croatia, Slovenia, Montenegro, Bosnia and Herzegovina and the Republic of Macedonia participating in it. It was the inaugural season with a two-level competition and the First Division being the top tier.

== Teams ==
On May 23, 2017, ABA League Assembly announced that 12 clubs would be competing in the league in the 2017–18 season. Participants were decided based on the following allocation:

- Serbia – three clubs
- Croatia – three clubs
- Slovenia – one club
- Bosnia and Herzegovina – one club
- Montenegro – one club
- Macedonia – one club

Two additional spots were allocated to teams from countries whose clubs had highest coefficients in country rankings during the 2016–17 season. Those two countries were Serbia and Montenegro.

=== National standings ===
For ten teams, per country allocation was determined based on a coefficient which was calculated as the sum of all victories that clubs from a certain country had achieved during the previous regular season divided by the number of clubs from that country. The remaining spots were awarded bye the league board which selected two wild cards.

Country	Allocated	2016–17 Coefficient	Total Clubs
Serbia	3	16.25	4
Montenegro	1	14.00	2
Croatia	3	13.33	3
Bosnia and Herzegovina	1	13.00	1
Slovenia	1	9.00	1
Macedonia	1	9.00	1
Total	10	2	12

=== Team allocation ===
Final league positions in the previous domestic league season are shown in parentheses.

Regular season
(Serbia) Crvena zvezda mts (1st)	(Serbia) Mega Bemax (4th)	(Croatia) Cedevita (1st)	(Bosnia and Herzegovina) Igokea (1st)
(Serbia) FMP (2nd)	(Montenegro) Budućnost VOLI (1st)	(Croatia) Cibona (2nd)	(Slovenia) Petrol Olimpija (1st)
(Serbia) Partizan NIS (3rd)	(Montenegro) Mornar (2nd)	(Croatia) Zadar (6th)	(North Macedonia) MZT Skopje Aerodrom (1st)

=== Venues and locations ===
Location of teams in the 2017–18 ABA League First Division

Team	Home city	Arena	Capacity
Budućnost VOLI	Podgorica	Morača Sports Center	4,000
Cedevita	Zagreb	Dražen Petrović	5,400
Cibona	Zagreb	Dražen Petrović	5,400
Crvena zvezda mts	Belgrade	Aleksandar Nikolić	5,878
FMP	Belgrade	Železnik Hall	3,000
Igokea	Aleksandrovac	Laktaši Sports Hall	3,050
Mega Bemax	Sremska Mitrovica	Sports Hall Pinki	2,500
Mornar	Bar	Topolica Sport Hall	2,625
MZT Skopje Aerodrom	Skopje	Jane Sandanski	7,500
Partizan NIS	Belgrade	Aleksandar Nikolić	5,878
Petrol Olimpija	Ljubljana	Arena Stožice	12,480
Zadar	Zadar	Krešimir Ćosić	7,847

=== Personnel and sponsorship ===
Team	Head coach	Captain	Kit manufacturer	Shirt sponsor
Budućnost VOLI	(Serbia) Aleksandar Džikić	(Montenegro) Suad Šehović	Spalding	VOLI
Cedevita	(Slovenia) Jure Zdovc	(Croatia) Roko Ukić	Nike	Cedevita
Cibona	(Croatia) Ante Nazor	(Croatia) Marin Rozić	Adidas	—
Crvena zvezda mts	(Serbia) Dušan Alimpijević	(Serbia) Branko Lazić	Nike	mts
FMP	(Serbia) Vladimir Jovanović	(Serbia) Filip Čović	Champion	FMP
Igokea	(Bosnia and Herzegovina) Dragan Bajić	(Serbia) Vuk Radivojević	GBT	m:tel
Mega Bemax	(Serbia) Dejan Milojević	(Serbia) Nikola Rebić	Adidas	Bemax
Mornar	(Montenegro) Mihailo Pavićević	(Montenegro) Marko Mijović	Adidas	Bar Municipality
MZT Skopje Aerodrom	(Serbia) Željko Lukajić	(North Macedonia) Damjan Stojanovski	Adidas	UNIBanka, triglav
Partizan NIS	(Serbia) Nenad Čanak	(Serbia) Novica Veličković	Under Armour	NIS
Petrol Olimpija	(Slovenia) Zoran Martič	(Slovenia) Gregor Hrovat	Macron	Petrol
Zadar	(Croatia) Aramis Naglić	(Croatia) Šime Špralja	Champion	OTP Bank

=== Coaching changes ===
Team	Outgoing manager	Date of vacancy	Position in table	Replaced with	Date of appointment
Budućnost VOLI	(Greece) Ilias Zouros	14 April 2017	Pre-season	(Serbia) Aleksandar Džikić	22 June 2017
Cedevita	(Croatia) Veljko Mršić	9 June 2017	Pre-season	(Slovenia) Jure Zdovc	14 June 2017
Cibona	(Croatia) Damir Mulaomerović	13 June 2017	Pre-season	(Slovenia) Slobodan Subotić	17 June 2017
Partizan NIS	(Serbia) Aleksandar Džikić	13 June 2017	Pre-season	(Serbia) Miroslav Nikolić	18 July 2017
MZT Skopje Aerodrom	(Croatia) Ante Nazor	15 June 2017	Pre-season	(North Macedonia) Aleksandar Todorov	15 June 2017
Mornar	(Montenegro) Đorđije Pavićević	1 July 2017	Pre-season	(Montenegro) Mihailo Pavićević	1 July 2017
Crvena zvezda mts	(Montenegro) Dejan Radonjić	15 July 2017	Pre-season	(Serbia) Dušan Alimpijević	21 July 2017
FMP	(Serbia) Dušan Alimpijević	21 July 2017	Pre-season	(Serbia) Vladimir Jovanović	27 July 2017
Cibona	(Slovenia) Slobodan Subotić	11 November 2017	9th (3–5)	(Croatia) Ante Nazor	13 November 2017
MZT Skopje Aerodrom	(North Macedonia) Aleksandar Todorov	7 December 2017	12th (2–8)	(Serbia) Željko Lukajić	8 December 2017
Partizan NIS	(Serbia) Miroslav Nikolić	12 December 2017	5th (5–6)	(Serbia) Nenad Čanak	14 December 2017
Petrol Olimpija	(Slovenia) Gašper Okorn	8 January 2018	11th (5–10)	(Slovenia) Zoran Martič	8 January 2018

== Regular season ==
=== League table ===
Pos	Team	Pld	W	L	PF	PA	PD	Pts	Qualification or relegation
1	(Serbia) Crvena zvezda mts	22	19	3	1955	1679	+276	41	Advance to the playoffs
2	(Montenegro) Budućnost VOLI	22	17	5	1863	1661	+202	39 (Note: Budućnost VOLI 1–1, 1.01; Cedevita 1–1, 0.99)	Advance to the playoffs
3	(Croatia) Cedevita	22	17	5	1798	1645	+153	39	Advance to the playoffs
4	(Montenegro) Mornar	22	14	8	1825	1790	+35	36	Advance to the playoffs
5	(Serbia) Partizan NIS	22	11	11	1936	1893	+43	33	
6	(Croatia) Zadar	22	10	12	1846	1885	−39	32 (Note: Zadar 1–1, 1.09; Petrol Olimpija 1–1, 0.92)	
7	(Slovenia) Petrol Olimpija	22	10	12	1738	1793	−55	32	
8	(Serbia) FMP	22	9	13	1756	1763	−7	31	
9	(Serbia) Mega Bemax	22	8	14	1849	1858	−9	30	
10	(Bosnia and Herzegovina) Igokea	22	7	15	1782	1876	−94	29 (Note: Igokea 1–1, 1.03; Cibona 1–1, 0.97)	
11	(Croatia) Cibona	22	7	15	1754	1890	−136	29	
12	(North Macedonia) MZT Skopje Aerodrom	22	3	19	1659	2028	−369	25	Relegation to the Second Division

Source: ABA League

=== Positions by round ===
Team ╲ Round	1	2	3	4	5	6	7	8	9	10	11	12	13	14	15	16	17	18	19	20	21	22
(Serbia) Crvena zvezda mts	1	2	1	1	3	2	2	2	2	2	2	1	1	1	3	2	2	1	1	1	1	1
(Montenegro) Budućnost VOLI	6	6	5	2	1	1	1	1	1	1	1	2	2	2	1	1	1	2	2	2	2	2
(Croatia) Cedevita	3	1	3	4	5	4	3	3	3	3	3	3	3	3	2	3	3	3	3	3	3	3
(Montenegro) Mornar	12	9	12	12	11	8	9	6	8	10	8	10	8	6	4	4	4	4	4	4	4	4
(Serbia) Partizan NIS	9	11	7	6	4	3	5	4	5	5	5	4	4	7	6	7	5	6	5	5	5	5
(Croatia) Zadar	8	12	9	11	12	12	10	11	11	9	6	5	6	5	7	5	7	7	7	7	6	6
(Slovenia) Petrol Olimpija	5	8	10	9	8	10	11	10	7	6	7	9	10	10	11	11	11	11	8	8	8	7
(Serbia) FMP	11	3	6	3	2	5	4	5	4	4	4	6	5	4	5	6	6	5	6	6	7	8
(Serbia) Mega Bemax	2	7	2	5	7	9	6	7	9	11	9	11	11	11	10	10	10	9	10	9	9	9
(Bosnia and Herzegovina) Igokea	7	5	4	8	9	6	7	8	6	7	10	7	9	9	8	8	8	8	9	10	10	10
(Croatia) Cibona	10	4	8	7	6	7	8	9	10	8	11	8	7	8	9	9	9	10	11	11	11	11
(North Macedonia) MZT Skopje Aerodrom	4	10	11	10	10	11	12	12	12	12	12	12	12	12	12	12	12	12	12	12	12	12

=== Results ===
Home \ Away	BUD	CED	CIB	CZV	FMP	IGO	MEG	MOR	MZT	PAR	OLI	ZAD
Budućnost VOLI (Montenegro)	—	66–60	71–62	92–86	87–64	81–59	84–64	79–70	104–62	86–79	88–66	87–85
Cedevita (Croatia)	76–71	—	91–68	79–74	74–67	79–84	75–73	99–74	77–65	85–75	84–60	102–101
Cibona (Croatia)	87–93	100–94	—	87–93	84–85	87–86	95–93	79–82	77–92	74–90	96–85	78–80
Crvena zvezda mts (Serbia)	75–79	82–66	107–69	—	84–77	85–80	90–80	88–77	112–73	86–74	80–76	97–67
FMP (Serbia)	76–93	71–80	99–79	77–100	—	95–73	96–88	79–84	100–72	83–71	81–86	91–76
Igokea (Bosnia and Herzegovina)	98–94	61–69	63–57	76–82	75–65	—	82–89	79–93	99–108	67–74	86–78	94–92
Mega Bemax (Serbia)	83–94	77–81	95–88	85–90	74–72	99–87	—	91–70	106–77	89–102	77–86	71–73
Mornar (Montenegro)	87–81	89–94	78–82	74–82	73–81	87–83	87–83	—	106–75	83–81	101–81	80–70
MZT Skopje Aerodrom (North Macedonia)	71–93	64–85	76–83	58–92	67–72	68–77	76–92	69–72	—	92–89	55–96	80–85
Partizan NIS (Serbia)	94–83	82–92	80–69	84–100	87–84	117–104	89–73	93–98	112–94	—	77–78	95–87
Petrol Olimpija (Slovenia)	79–88	65–64	78–80	73–82	73–64	95–93	69–76	64–67	94–85	89–87	—	90–85
Zadar (Croatia)	78–69	76–92	79–73	76–88	83–77	82–76	95–91	77–93	105–80	97–104	97–77	—

Source: ABA League
Legend: Blue = home team win; Red = away team win.
Matches with lighter background shading were decided after overtime.

== Playoffs ==
The semi-finals was played in a best-of-three format, while the Finals were played in a best-of-five format. Playoffs started on 17 March 2018, while the Finals ended on 14 April 2018.

Semifinals
18 March–2 April
(Serbia) Crvena zvezda mts	2
(Montenegro) Mornar	1
18 March–2 April
(Montenegro) Budućnost VOLI	2
(Croatia) Cedevita	1

Final
9–14 April
(Serbia) Crvena zvezda mts	1
(Montenegro) Budućnost VOLI	3

2017–18 ABA League Champions
(Montenegro)
Budućnost VOLI
1st title

=== Semifinals ===
Team 1	Series	Team 2	Game 1	Game 2	Game 3
Crvena zvezda mts (Serbia)	2–1	(Montenegro) Mornar	91–63	84–88	88–69
Budućnost VOLI (Montenegro)	2–1	(Croatia) Cedevita	84–83	75–82	72–57

=== Finals ===
Team 1	Series	Team 2	Game 1	Game 2	Game 3	Game 4	Game 5
Crvena zvezda mts (Serbia)	1–3	(Montenegro) Budućnost VOLI	76–80	69–59	77–78	73–77	

== Final standings ==
Pos	Team	Pld	W	L	PF	PA	PD	Pts	Qualification or relegation
1	(Montenegro) Budućnost VOLI	29	22	7	2388	2178	+210	51	Qualification to EuroLeague
2	(Serbia) Crvena zvezda mts	29	22	7	2513	2193	+320	51	Qualification to EuroCup
3	(Croatia) Cedevita	25	18	7	2020	1876	+144	43	Qualification to EuroCup
4	(Montenegro) Mornar	25	15	10	2045	2053	−8	40	Qualification to EuroCup
5	(Serbia) Partizan NIS	22	11	11	1936	1893	+43	33	
6	(Croatia) Zadar	22	10	12	1846	1885	−39	32	
7	(Slovenia) Petrol Olimpija	22	10	12	1738	1793	−55	32	
8	(Serbia) FMP	22	9	13	1756	1763	−7	31	
9	(Serbia) Mega Bemax	22	8	14	1849	1858	−9	30	
10	(Bosnia and Herzegovina) Igokea	22	7	15	1782	1876	−94	29	
11	(Croatia) Cibona	22	7	15	1754	1890	−136	29	
12	(North Macedonia) MZT Skopje Aerodrom	22	3	19	1659	2028	−369	25	Relegation to Second Division

Source: ABA League

== Statistical leaders ==
As of 12 March 2018 , after the end of the Regular Season.

=== PIR ===
Pos	Player	Club	PIR
1	(Croatia) Luka Žorić	Cibona	23.24
2	(Serbia) Uroš Luković	Mornar	20.90
3	(United States) Patrick Miller	Partizan NIS	20.36
4	(United States) Nigel Williams-Goss	Partizan NIS	20.30
5	(Croatia) Luka Božić	Zadar	19.09

=== Points ===
Pos	Player	Club	PPG
1	(Croatia) Luka Žorić	Cibona	19.71
2	(United States) Josh Bostic	Zadar	19.23
3	(United States) Nigel Williams-Goss	Partizan NIS	16.85
4	(Montenegro) Derek Needham	Mornar	16.82
5	(Serbia) Filip Čović	FMP	15.76

=== Rebounds ===
Pos	Player	Club	RPG
1	(Croatia) Luka Božić	Zadar	7.77
2	(Serbia) Uroš Luković	Mornar	7.52
3	(United States) Devin Oliver	Petrol Olimpija	7.27
4	(United States) Jordan Morgan	Petrol Olimpija	7.18
5	(Croatia) Luka Žorić	Cibona	6.95

=== Assists ===
Pos	Player	Club	APG
1	(Serbia) Filip Čović	FMP	7.43
2	(United States) Nigel Williams-Goss	Partizan NIS	6.95
3	(Croatia) Dominik Mavra	MZT Skopje Aerodrom	6.25
4	(Montenegro) Taylor Rochestie	Crvena zvezda mts	5.95
5	(United States) Patrick Miller	Partizan NIS	5.43

Source: ABA League

== Awards ==
Pos.	Player	Team	Ref.
MVP
C	(Croatia) Luka Žorić	(Croatia) Cibona	
Finals MVP
PG	(Bosnia and Herzegovina) Nemanja Gordić	(Montenegro) Budućnost VOLI	
Top Prospect
SF	(Bosnia and Herzegovina) Džanan Musa	(Croatia) Cedevita	
Ideal Starting Five
PG	(Montenegro) Taylor Rochestie	(Serbia) Crvena zvezda mts	
SG	(Bosnia and Herzegovina) Nemanja Gordić	(Montenegro) Budućnost	
SF	(Bosnia and Herzegovina) Džanan Musa	(Croatia) Cedevita	
PF	(Serbia) Novica Veličković	(Serbia) Partizan NIS	
C	(Serbia) Uroš Luković	(Montenegro) Mornar	

== MVP List ==
=== MVP of the Round ===
Round	Player	Team	PIR	Ref.
1	(France) Mathias Lessort	(Serbia) Crvena zvezda mts	30	
2	(United States) Will Cherry	(Croatia) Cedevita	27	
3	(Croatia) Luka Božić	(Croatia) Zadar	32	
4	(Croatia) Luka Žorić	(Croatia) Cibona	41	
5	(United States) Patrick Miller	(Serbia) Partizan NIS	40	
6	(Serbia) Uroš Luković	(Montenegro) Mornar	31	
7	(Montenegro) Milko Bjelica	(Serbia) Crvena zvezda mts	35	
8	(Montenegro) Derek Needham	(Montenegro) Mornar	30	
9	(Bosnia and Herzegovina) Džanan Musa	(Croatia) Cedevita	46	
10	(United States) Josh Bostic	(Croatia) Zadar	29	
11	(Croatia) Roko Ukić	(Croatia) Cedevita	28	
12	(Serbia) Nikola Jevtović	(Bosnia and Herzegovina) Igokea	29	
13	(Serbia) Uroš Luković (2)	(Montenegro) Mornar	40	
14	(United States) Josh Bostic (2)	(Croatia) Zadar	40	
15	(Serbia) Novica Veličković	(Serbia) Partizan NIS	31	
16	(Croatia) Dominik Mavra	(North Macedonia) MZT Skopje Aerodrom	34	
17	(Serbia) Novica Veličković (2)	(Serbia) Partizan NIS	36	
18	(Slovenia) Vlatko Čančar	(Serbia) Mega Bemax	29	
19	(Montenegro) Derek Needham (2)	(Montenegro) Mornar	29	
20	(Montenegro) Danilo Nikolić	(Montenegro) Budućnost VOLI	33	
21	(Serbia) Novica Veličković (3)	(Serbia) Partizan NIS	36	
22	(United States) Jordan Morgan	(Slovenia) Petrol Olimpija	32	
SF1	(Bosnia and Herzegovina) Nemanja Gordić	(Montenegro) Budućnost VOLI	30	
SF2	(United States) Demetris Nichols	(Croatia) Cedevita	30	
SF3	(Serbia) Ognjen Dobrić	(Serbia) Crvena zvezda mts	23	
F1	(Montenegro) Nikola Ivanović	(Montenegro) Budućnost VOLI	23	
F2	(Slovenia) Alen Omić	(Serbia) Crvena zvezda mts	27	
F3	(Bosnia and Herzegovina) Nemanja Gordić (2)	(Montenegro) Budućnost VOLI	21	
F4	(Montenegro) Filip Barović	(Montenegro) Budućnost VOLI	23	

=== MVP of the Month ===
Month	Player	Team	Ref.
2017
October	(United States) Patrick Miller	(Serbia) Partizan NIS	
November	(Montenegro) Milko Bjelica	(Serbia) Crvena zvezda mts	
December	(United States) Josh Bostic	(Croatia) Zadar	
2018
January	(Serbia) Novica Veličković	(Serbia) Partizan NIS	
February	(Serbia) Uroš Luković	(Montenegro) Mornar	

== Attendances ==
Attendances include playoff games:

Pos	Team	Total	High	Low	Average	Change
1	(Serbia) Partizan NIS	50,500	6,300	2,850	4,591	−2.5%
2	(Serbia) Crvena zvezda mts	66,244	7,237	1,987	4,416	+1.8%
3	(Croatia) Zadar	47,750	6,500	2,050	4,341	+30.6%
4	(Montenegro) Budućnost VOLI	51,028	6,000	1,150	3,402	+34.6%
5	(Bosnia and Herzegovina) Igokea	24,080	3,000	1,550	2,189	+31.7%
6	(Montenegro) Mornar	25,524	3,500	1,200	2,127	−11.7%
7	(North Macedonia) MZT Skopje Aerodrom	21,700	4,000	900	1,973	+53.7%
8	(Serbia) Mega Bemax	15,840	2,550	700	1,440	+5.5%
9	(Slovenia) Petrol Olimpija	15,700	3,000	750	1,427	+5.1%
10	(Croatia) Cibona	15,550	3,500	250	1,414	+15.2%
11	(Croatia) Cedevita	16,560	2,200	800	1,380	−5.2%
12	(Serbia) FMP	10,050	1,350	750	914	+76.0%
	League total	360,576	7,237	250	2,539	+24.1%

Updated to match(es) played on April 14, 2018. Source: ABA League

== ABA League clubs in European competitions ==
Competition	Team	Progress		Result
EuroLeague	(Serbia) Crvena zvezda mts	Regular season		14th (11–19)
EuroCup	(Montenegro) Budućnost VOLI	Quarterfinals	▲(2)	Eliminated by (Turkey) Darüşşafaka, 0–2
EuroCup	(Croatia) Cedevita	Top 16 Group G	▲(1)	4th (0–6)
EuroCup	(Serbia) Partizan NIS	Regular season Group C		6th (1–9)
Champions League	(Slovenia) Petrol Olimpija	Regular season Group C		7th (4–10)
Champions League	(Montenegro) Mornar	Second qualifying round		Eliminated by (Russia) Avtodor Saratov, 132–158; transferred to FIBA Europe Cup
FIBA Europe Cup	(Montenegro) Mornar	Quarterfinals	▲(3)	Eliminated by (Netherlands) Donar, 147–168

== See also ==
- 2017–18 ABA League Second Division
- 2017 ABA League Supercup
- 2017–18 Junior ABA League
- 2017–18 WABA League

2017–18 domestic competitions

- 2017–18 Basketball League of Serbia
- (Croatia) 2017–18 A-1 League
- (Slovenia) 2017–18 Slovenian Basketball League
- (Montenegro) 2017–18 Prva A liga
- 2017–18 Basketball Championship of Bosnia and Herzegovina
- (North Macedonia) 2017–18 Macedonian First League

Teams

- 2017–18 KK Crvena zvezda season
- 2017–18 KK Partizan season
