= Sports Center Rožaje =

Sports center in Rožaje, Montenegro

SC Rožaje
- Interactive map of SC Rožaje
- Full name: Sports Center Rožaje
- Location: Rožaje, Montenegro
- Coordinates: 42.8372°N 20.1743°E
- Owner: Rožaje Municipality
- Capacity: 2,500 (large hall); 3,000 (stadium)

Construction
- Opened: 2006

Tenants
- FK Ibar; KK Ibar; OK Ibar

Sports Center Rožaje (SC Rožaje; Montenegrin and Bosnian: Sportski centar Rožaje / Спортски центар Рожаје (СЦ Рожаје)), also known as Sports Center Bandžovo Brdo (Sportski centar Bandžovo Brdo / Спортски центар Банџово Брдо), is a sports center located in Rožaje, Montenegro. It is addressed on Carine bb on Bandžovo Brdo next to the building of solidarity. The main facilities of this sports center are the large hall and the main city stadium Bandžovo Brdo. Next to the stadium is an assistant football field. The sports center also has complex from small sports. In the near future, an Olympic pool will be built as a part of this sport complex. The director is Rešid Pepić.

== Purpose ==
The complex was created by the decision of The Municipal Assembly of Rožaje number 1383 from 10.07.2006. The main activity of the complex is the management and maintenance of sports facilities as well as:

- providing services in the field of sports and recreation
- provision of sport competitions for the organization of sports events and training
- provision of services to citizens and working collectives in sport and recreational activities
- organizing sports and cultural and public events

== Sports in the large hall ==
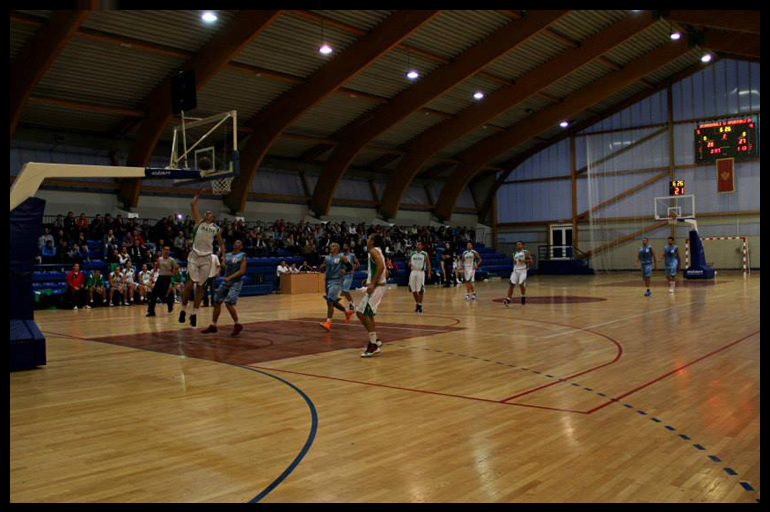
Inside view of the SC Rožaje

The large hall is built for various sports, such as:

- Basketball
- Handball
- Futsal
- Table tennis
- Indoor tennis
- Volleyball
- and other

== Sports events ==
- European champion title in kick-boxing (Muković - Toth) - WKU Association (may, 2013) (4 K-1 matches in addition)
- World champion title in kick-boxing (Muković - Navratil) - WKU Association (October, 2013)
- K-1 duel between Montenegro and Serbia - (October, 2013)
