= Vrelo Ibra =

Vrelo Ibra Spring of Ibar
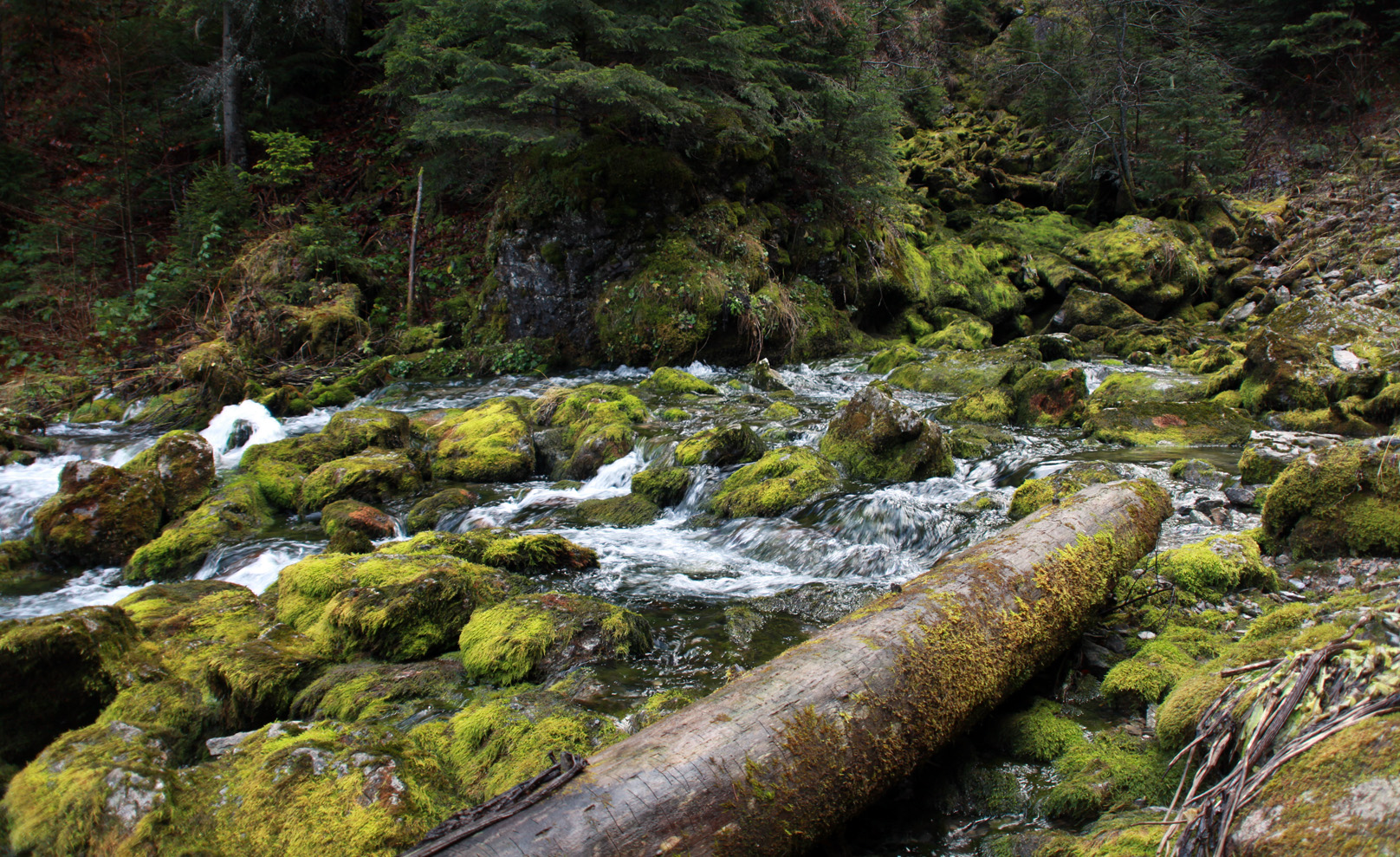

Location
- Country: Montenegro
- Municipality: Rožaje

Vrelo Ibra (Cyrillic: Врело Ибра, pronounced [ʋrê.lo iɓɾa]; English: Spring of Ibar) is the spring of the River Ibar located in the north-east region of Montenegro in Rožaje. It is one of the top natural landmarks in Rožaje.

It is located 10 km away from the city center on the northern side at the foot of the mountain Hajla in a dense conifer forest. Rožaje has a big amount of springs, but the strongest one is the spring of the river Ibar which is also the longest Montenegrin river.

The road to the spring has beautiful landscapes with a lot of places suitable for picnic or sport activities (such as mountain biking) or other recreation. The road which needs only to be followed to the spring is located in Suho Polje a few kilometers from the city center of Rožaje on Ibarska magistrala in the direction to Berane, on the left side over the bridge next to the hotel Aldi.

The road to the Vrelo Ibra is suitable for going by foot or by any vehicle. The strongest recommendation of the turistic organization of Rožaje is to go with a bike. Near the spring is located the main turistic mountain house in Bandžov.

The length of the road to Vrelo Ibra is 12 km from the place Suho Polje in Rožaje. In the upper course of the river Ibar, which can be followed on the main road to the spring, can be found a lot of brown trout, and in the downstream part of the present chub, carp and whitefish. Vrelo Ibra is a very romantic place which potentials are still not fully valorized.

== See also ==
- Hajla
- Ibar
- Lake Rujište
