= Ibar (river) =

River in Kosovo, Montenegro and Serbia

Ibar Ibër
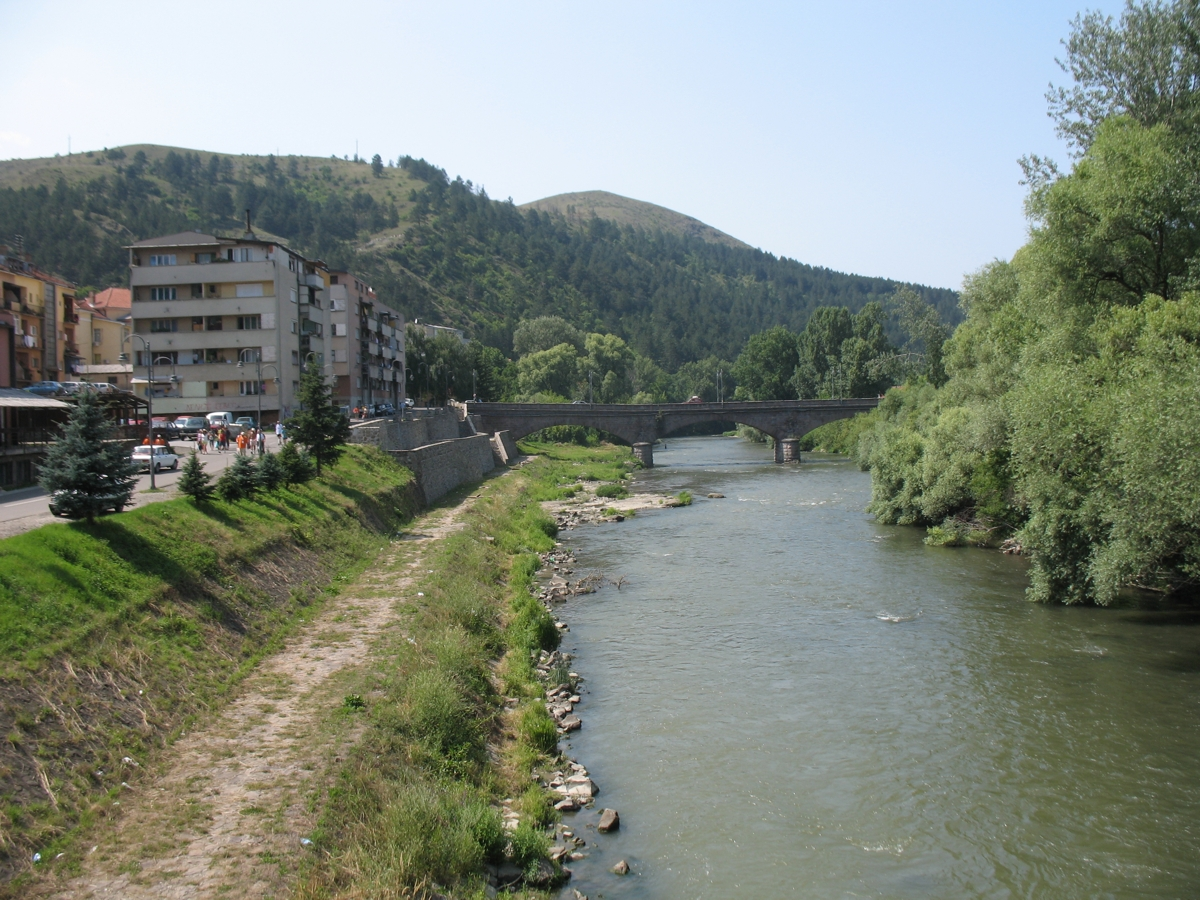
- Ibar River in Raška
- Native name: Ибар (Serbian); Ibri (Albanian)

Location
- Countries: Kosovo; Montenegro; Serbia

Physical characteristics
- Source
  - location: Hajla mountain, Rožaje, eastern Montenegro
- Mouth
  - location: into West Morava at Kraljevo
  - coordinates: 43°43′39″N 20°44′58″E
- Length: 272 km (169 mi)
- Basin size: 7,925 km^{2} (3,060 sq mi)

Basin features
- Progression: West Morava→ Great Morava→ Danube→ Black Sea
- Cities: Rožaje; Zubin Potok; Mitrovica; North Mitrovica; Zvečan; Leposavić

The Ibar (Serbian Cyrillic: Ибар, pronounced [îbar]) or Ibër (Albanian definite form: Ibri), is a river that flows through Montenegro, Kosovo and Serbia, with a total length of 272 km (169 mi). The river begins in the Hajla mountain, in Rožaje, eastern Montenegro, and passes through southwestern Serbia and northern Kosovo, where it leads back into Serbia to flow into the West Morava river near Kraljevo.

The Ibar belongs to the Black Sea drainage basin. Its own drainage area is 7,925 km^{2} (3,060 sq mi), with an average discharge of 60 m^{3}/s (2,100 cu ft/s) at the mouth. It is not navigable.

== Etymology ==
The origin of the name Ibar is uncertain and subject to several theories. According to the historian Ejup Mušović, the name may derive from the Illyrian word ibard, meaning “blond” or “bright”. This interpretation aligns with the Albanian adjective i bardhë, which is still used today with the meanings “white,” “bright,” or “pure.” The word bardhë derives from Proto-Albanian bardza, which in turn comes from Proto-Indo-European bʰerHǵ- (“to shine, whiten”).

Another theory links it to the Greek name Hiberus, by which the river was known in antiquity. Other regional rivers also bear the Ancient Greek name Ἕβρος (Hébros) or the Modern Greek Έβρος (Évros), both meaning "wide river". An alternative hypothesis is that Hiberus is borrowed from Thracian ebros meaning "splasher". Some scholars has theorized that the word Ibar is related to the Basque word for "river" (i-ba/r/i), which is also how the Ebro river in Spain may have received its name.

== Upper course ==
The Ibar originates from six springs on the Hajla mountain in eastern Montenegro. It generally flows north-east, passing through Ibarac, Rožaje, Radetina and Bać, after which it enters Serbia. Passing through the most southern part of Raška District, it flows along several small villages. In this whole area, the river has no major tributaries, but many short streams which flow into it from surrounding mountains. This part also represents the route of one of two main roads connecting Serbia and Montenegro (Ibarska magistrala).

== Middle course ==
Continuing south, the river enters Kosovo and passes through Gazivode, Zubin Potok, Ugljare, Zupče and Shipol, reaching the city of Mitrovica. There, it makes a sharp, elbow turn to the north, flowing through Zvečan, Slatina, Sočanica, Leposavić, Dren and Lešak, entering southwestern Serbia at the village of Jarinje.

=== In Kosovo ===
In Kosovo, the river is dammed, creating the artificial Gazivoda/Ujman Lake (Serbian: Језеро Газиводе, Albanian: Liqeni i Ujmanit). Water from the lake is used for industrial and mining facilities in the Trepça area. Below Ujmani, another reservoir is created, the Pridvorica Lake. These lakes allow irrigation of an area of 300 km^{2}, representing part of a plan, never completed, of a huge Ibar-Lepenac Hydrosystem, which was supposed to regulate the Ibar-Sitnica-Lepenac watercourse (including ecological protection, irrigation and power production).

At Mitrovica, the river enters a minerals and ore-rich area of the western slopes of Kopaonik mountain, which it follows for the next 100 km (62 mi) or so. The area is especially rich in lead, zinc and silver (Stari Trg, Trepça and Leposavic mines).

Right on its elbow turn, the Ibar receives its longest (right) tributary, the Sitnica.

=== In Serbia ===
Entering southwestern Serbia again, the river receives its major tributaries: the Raška, Studenica and Lopatnica, from the left, and the Jošanica.

In this section, the river has carved the 40 km (25 mi) long and 550 m (1,804 ft) deep Ibar gorge, which is the natural route for the major road in this part of Serbia, the Ibar Highway. This stretch of the river is famous for its pinched meanders and gigantic whirlpools. The whole area is 110 km (68 mi) long (meridionally stretched), and at Serbia's parts is popularly divided into several colorfully named valleys:

- Dolina istorije (Serbian: Долина историје, lit. 'Valley of history'), consisting of ruins of the medieval city of Maglič, the monastery of Studenica, the monastery of Žiča, the monastery of Gradac, etc.;
- Dolina jorgovana (Serbian: Долина јоргована, lit. 'Valley of the lilacs');
- Dolina banja (Serbian: Долина бања, lit. 'Valley of the spas'), with many spas and springs, such as Jošanička Banja, Mataruška Banja and Bogutovačka Banja.

The gorge is carved between the mountains of Golija, Čemerno and Troglav from the east, and Kopaonik, Željin and Stolovi from the west.

This is a continuation of Kopaonik's mining-rich area, including deposits of iron ore (Kopaonik, Raška), nickel (Kopaonik), asbestos (Brvenik), magnesite (Bela Stena) and hard coal (Baljevac, Ušće and Jarando).

== Lower course ==
After receiving the Lopatnica, the river enters a lowland and starts bending to the northeast, passes north of Mataruška Banja and through Kraljevo, where it receives the Ribnica (Ibar) from the right. Soon after, it merges into the West Morava from the right, near Šumarice.

The Ibar has previously gained notoriety as being the most polluted river in Serbia (together with its major tributary, the Sitnica), especially from frequent spills of extremely poisonous phenol, which causes constant problems for the population of Kraljevo, since the city uses the river's water for public waterworks.

== Electricity ==
In 2009, governments of Serbia and Italy signed an agreement which included construction of the "Ibar hydropower plants" complex, with ten hydroelectric power plants on Ibar. A detailed project was drafted, all studies were conducted, a joint Serbian-Italian company for construction of the facilities was formed, and the parliament ratified the agreement. After the 2011 Italian government change, Italy also changed its abroad investment policies and effectively quit the agreement. Power plants were to be built between the village of Bojanići and locality of Lakat, near Mataruška Banja. The entire section is administratively part of the City of Kraljevo. The project included 10 cascade dams, 12 to 15 m (39 to 49 ft) high, with all plants being run-of-the-river type. Therefore, no settlements will be relocated as the flooding of the valley would be minimal. The existing road would have to be relocated at four locations.

The planned dams were Bojanići, Gokčanica, Ušće, Glavica, Cerje, Gradina, Bela Glava, Dobre Strane, Maglič, and Lakat, with the total capacity of 450 GW-h. All dams would have fish ladders and kayaking paths. Studies envisioned tourism development with ten small, cascade reservoirs, but also concluded that the stable water levels would prevent floods and benefit the fish spawning, including species presently not inhabiting Ibar, like carp or zander, which could be introduced. Architect Milan Lojanica was hired to design the dams. He designed them in the spirit of the Serbian medieval architecture and the Nemanjić period. Ratification of the agreement expired in 2021, but some experts publicly revived the idea in January 2023, as the project is generally not considered complicated and expensive.

== See also ==
- List of most-polluted rivers
- List of rivers of Kosovo
- List of rivers of Montenegro
- List of rivers of Serbia
- List of rivers of Europe
