= Ibarac =

Ibarac Ибарац Dedinje
- Town
- Location within Montenegro
- Coordinates: 42°50′6″N 20°9′26″E
- Country: Montenegro
- Municipality: Rožaje

Population (2011)
  - Total: 3,135
- Time zone: UTC+1 (CET)
  - Summer (DST): UTC+2 (CEST)

Ibarac (Serbian Cyrillic: Ибарац; Albanian: Dedinje) is a small town in the municipality of Rožaje, Montenegro. It is located just southwest of Rožaje town.

== Demographics ==
According to the 2011 census, its population was 3,135.

Ethnicity in 2011
Ethnicity	Number	Percentage
Bosniaks	2,730	87.1%
Albanians	192	6.1%
Montenegrins	48	1.5%
other/undeclared	165	5.3%
Total	3,135	100%
