= Plumci =

Plumci Плумци Plluncaj
- Village
- Location within Montenegro
- Country: Montenegro
- Municipality: Rožaje

Population (2011)
  - Total: 166
- Time zone: UTC+1 (CET)
  - Summer (DST): UTC+2 (CEST)

Plumci (Cyrillic: Плумци; Albanian: Plluncaj) is a village in the municipality of Rožaje, Montenegro.

== Demographics ==
According to the 2011 census, its population was 166.

Ethnicity in 2011
Ethnicity	Number	Percentage
Bosniaks	82	49.4%
Albanians	82	49.4%
other/undeclared	2	1.2%
Total	166	100%
