= OK Ibar Rožaje =

Odbojkaški klub Ibar
- Full name: Odbojkaški klub Ibar Rožaje
- Short name: OK Ibar
- Founded: 1993
- Ground: Large hall of SC Rožaje (Capacity: 2,500)
- Chairman: Asmir Nurković
- Manager: Isko Bećović
- Captain: Merdan Nokić
- League: Montenegrin Volleyball League
- 2014–15: 1

Uniforms
Home	Away

Odbojkaški klub Ibar (English: Ibar Volleyball Club), commonly known as OK Ibar, is a volleyball club from Rožaje, Montenegro. The team competes in the First Montenegrin volleyball league.

== History ==
OK Ibar was founded in Rožaje, FR Yugoslavia in 1993. Volleyball has its tradition in the city. In 1995. the women's team of OK Ibar became the national champion. In the mid-1990s, it was one of the best teams in Montenegro in younger leagues while the women's team played constantly as a first division team until the independence of Montenegro. Due to the difficult financial situation, OK Ibar resigned from the league in the 2012–13 season. In 2012, OK Ibar received a special award from the Rožaje Municipality for 20 years of existing.

== Honours before the independence of Montenegro (in 2006) ==
All results are from the Montenegrin leagues.

=== Men's team ===
- Junior team
  - 2nd place: 1995/96
  - 4th place: 1996/97, 2000/2001
  - 5th place: 1997/98, 1998/99
- Cadet team
  - 3rd place: 1997/98
  - 4th place: 2000/2001
  - 5th place: 2002/03
- Pioneer team
  - 3rd place: 1999/00
  - 5th place: 1997/98

=== Women's team ===
- Senior team

1st place: 1994/95

- Junior team
  - 3. place: 2002/03
  - 5. place: 1999/00
- Cadet team
  - 3. place: 2000/01
  - 4. place: 1999/00
- Pioneer team
  - 2. place: 1999/00
  - 3. place: 1996/97, 2001/02, 2002/03
  - 4. place: 1998/99
  - 5. place: 2000/01

== Sports Center ==
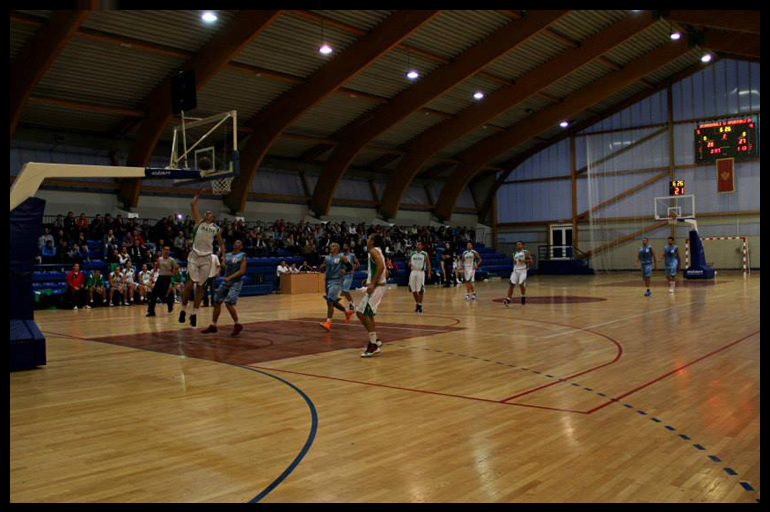
Inside view of the SC Rožaje, Bandžovo Brdo

Sports Center Rožaje (Bosnian/Montenegrin: Sportski centar Rožaje) is a sport center located in Rožaje, Montenegro, where OK Ibar plays its home matches. The center is located on Bandžovo Brdo, next to the main city football stadium. Construction of the complex began in 2006. The director is Rešid Pepić. The complex was created by the decision of The Municipal Assembly of Rožaje number 1383 from 10.07 2006. The main activity of the complex is the management and maintenance of sports facilities as well as:

- providing services in the field of sports and recreation
- provision of sport competitions for the organization of sports events and training
- provision of services to citizens and working collectives in sport and recreational activities
- organizing sports and cultural and public events

The main arena is built for various sports, such as:

- Basketball
- Handball
- Futsal
- Table tennis
- Indoor tennis
- Volleyball
- and other

== Supporters ==
Ibar fans are known as Gazije (from Arabic: ghāzī or ghazah, gazi; from ghazw, plural: ghazawāt; meaning 'armed incursion with the intention of conquering'. Gazije were the defenders of Islam in the period of the Ottoman Empire.) The group's traditional colours are black and white, which are also the colours of the football club FK Ibar, where Gazije first started giving their support. After the football club failed to reach the First Montenegrin League in 2006, 2007, and 2008, the footballers lost the support of fans since they failed to win the away play-off match against FK Dečić for the First league placement. The volleyball team had its biggest support when the women's team played in the First division.

== Team roster ==
Location of Rožaje, Montenegro

This is the roster of OK Ibar for the season 2013-14. The manager is Isko Bećović.

- (Montenegro) Merdan Nokić
- (Montenegro) Edin Šabović
- (Montenegro) Seid Šabović
- (Montenegro) Emir Ćosović
- (Montenegro) Jupo Kalač
- (Montenegro) Admir Rebronja
- (Serbia) Obrad Nikolić
- (Montenegro) Adis Tahirović
- (Montenegro) Alen Dacić
- (Montenegro) Amar Bećović
- (Montenegro) Nermin Topalović
- (Montenegro) Rinor Dacić

== Season 2013–14 ==
=== Group A ===
Pos	Team	Pld	W	L	Pts	SW	SL	SR	SPW	SPL	SPR
1	(Montenegro) OK Ibar	2	2	0	4	6	4	1.500	212	197	1.076
2	(Montenegro) OK Jedinstvo	2	1	1	4	5	4	1.250	204	182	1.121
3	(Montenegro) OK Volley Star	2	0	2	1	3	6	0.500	166	203	0.818

Updated to match(es) played on unknown. Source:

=== Group B ===
Pos	Team	Pld	W	L	Pts	SW	SL	SR	SPW	SPL	SPR
1	(Montenegro) OK Budvanska Rivijera II	4	3	1	8	9	5	1.800	305	264	1.155
2	(Montenegro) OK Budućnost II	4	2	2	6	6	6	1.000	257	253	1.016
3	(Montenegro) OK Sutjeska	4	1	3	4	5	9	0.556	270	315	0.857

Updated to match(es) played on unknown. Source:

== See also ==
- KK Ibar
- FK Ibar
- Sports Center Rožaje
