= Seošnica =

Seošnica Сеошница
- Village
- Location within Montenegro
- Country: Montenegro
- Municipality: Rožaje

Population (2011)
  - Total: 872
- Time zone: UTC+1 (CET)
  - Summer (DST): UTC+2 (CEST)

Seošnica (Serbian Cyrillic: Сеошница) is a village in the municipality of Rožaje, Montenegro.

== Demographics ==
According to the 2011 census, its population was 872.

Ethnicity in 2011
Ethnicity	Number	Percentage
Bosniaks	821	94.2%
other/undeclared	51	5.8%
Total	872	100%
