= Sinanovići =

Sinanovići Синановићи
- Village
- Country: Montenegro
- Municipality: Rožaje

Population (2011)
  - Total: 293
- Time zone: UTC+1 (CET)
  - Summer (DST): UTC+2 (CEST)

Sinanovići (Serbian Cyrillic: Синановићи) is a village in the municipality of Rožaje, Montenegro.

== Demographics ==
According to the 2011 census, its population was 293.

Ethnicity in 2011
Ethnicity	Number	Percentage
Bosniaks	212	72.4%
Serbs	33	11.3%
other/undeclared	48	16.4%
Total	293	100%
