= Crnokrpe =

Crnokrpe Црнокрпе Crnakrepë
- Village
- Location within Montenegro
- Country: Montenegro
- Municipality: Rožaje

Population (2011)
  - Total: 379
- Time zone: UTC+1 (CET)
  - Summer (DST): UTC+2 (CEST)

Crnokrpe (Serbian Cyrillic: Црнокрпе; Albanian: Crnakrepë) is a village in the municipality of Rožaje, Montenegro.

== Demographics ==
According to the 2011 census, its population was 379.

Ethnicity in 2011
| Ethnicity | Number | Percentage |
|---|---|---|
| Bosniaks | 336 | 88.7% |
| Albanians | 26 | 6.9% |
| Montenegrins | 7 | 1.8% |
| other/undeclared | 10 | 2.6% |
| Total | 379 | 100% |
