= Bandžov =

Bandžov Банџов Boxhovi
- Village
- Location within Montenegro
- Country: Montenegro
- Municipality: Rožaje

Population (2011)
  - Total: 159
- Time zone: UTC+1 (CET)
  - Summer (DST): UTC+2 (CEST)

Bandžov (Cyrillic: Банџов; Albanian: Boxhovi) is a village in the municipality of Rožaje, Montenegro. It is located close to the Kosovan border.

== Demographics ==
According to the 2011 census, its population was 159, all of them Albanians.
