= Donja Lovnica, Montenegro =

Donja Lovnica Доња Ловница
- Village
- Location within Montenegro
- Country: Montenegro
- Municipality: Rožaje

Population (2011)
  - Total: 825
- Time zone: UTC+1 (CET)
  - Summer (DST): UTC+2 (CEST)

Donja Lovnica (Serbian Cyrillic: Доња Ловница) is a village in the municipality of Rožaje, Montenegro.

== Demographics ==
According to the 2011 census, its population was 825.

Ethnicity in 2011
Ethnicity	Number	Percentage
Bosniaks	794	96.2%
Egyptians	19	2.3%
Serbs	6	0.7%
other/undeclared	6	0.7%
Total	825	100%
