= List of immovable cultural property of Rožaje =

This is a list of immovable cultural properties of Rožaje. The locations according to the numbers are given on the image on the right.
(Suggestion: Resize the image to see the numbers clearly.)

Nr.	Name	Image	Town / Village	Remarks
1	Old Ganići Tower bosnian: Stara Ganića kula		Rožaje, Rožaje	It was built in the 19th century where Ganići lived until the 1970s. In the image is the replica of the tower.
2	Gradina above the Ganići tower Gradina iznad Ganića kule		Rožaje, Rožaje	
3	Graveyard Bačevac; Groblje Bačevac		Bačevac, Rožaje	
4	Object in Seočnica; Objekat u Seošnici		Seošnica, Rožaje	
5	Crkvine; Crkvine		Seošnica, Rožaje	
6	Graveyard on Puhovača; Groblje na Puhovači		Kalače, Rožaje	
7	Graveyard in Honsiće; Groblje u Honsićima		Honsiće, Rožaje	
8	Metallica graveyard Metalica groblje		Metallica, Rožaje	
9	Old graveyard of Pepići; Staro pepićko groblje		Pepići, Rožaje	
10	Greek cemetery Grčko groblje		Zloglavlje, Rožaje	
11	Greek cemetery Grčko groblje		Grižice, Rožaje	
12	Crkvište; Crkvište		Bašča, Rožaje	
13	Pillar of siga Stub sige		Bašča, Rožaje	
14	Gradac; Gradac		Bašča, Rožaje	
15	Humka I Humka I		Vlahovi, Rožaje	
16	Humka II; Humka I		Vlahovi, Rožaje	
17	The cave on Gojakuši; Pećina na Gojakuši		Gojakuši, Rožaje	
18	The grave near Gradina; Grob kod Gradine		Mujov Vrh, Rožaje	
19	Gradina; Gradina		Rožaje	
20	Old graveyard Grahovo; Staro groblje Grahovo		Grahovo, Rožaje	
21	Greek cemetery Grčko groblje		Klanac, Rožaje	
22	Graveyard in Grahovo; Groblje		Grahovo, Rožaje	
23	The cave near Govedarica; Pećina kod Govedarice		Rožaje	
24	Džaros grave Džarov grob		Rožaje	
25	The graves Grobovi		Plunci, Rožaje	
26	Latin cemetery Latinsko groblje		Plunci, Rožaje	
27	Hadžići tower Hadžića kula		Balotiće, Rožaje	
28	Graveyard Balotiće; Groblje Balotići		Balotići, Rožaje	
29	The tomb of Shaikh Mehmed; Turbe Šejh Mehmeda		Rožaje	
30	Cove with cement entrance Okapina sa betonskim ulazom		Rožaje	
31	Cave opposite to the bridge Pećina preko puta		Rožaje	
32	Big cove Velika okapina		Rožaje	
33	The Flow; Protočna		Rožaje	
34	Cave with a small entrance Pećina sa malim ulazom		Rožaje	
35	Krstionica; Krstionica		Bijela Crkva, Rožaje	
36	Paljes cave Paljeva pećine		Besnik, Rožaje	
37	Strahobaša; Strahobaša		Besnik, Rožaje	
38	Humka; Humka		Skakavac, Rožaje	
39	Latin cemetery Latinsko groblje		Skakavac, Rožaje	
40	Perije; Perije		Besnik, Rožaje	
41	Najas graveyard Najino groblje		Besnik, Rožaje	
42	Humka I Humka I		Besnik, Rožaje	
43	Latin cemetery Latinsko groblje		Biševo, Rožaje	
44	Pljakas grave Pljakin grob		Rožaje	
45	The old graveyard of Radetina; Staro radetinsko groblje		Radetina, Rožaje	
46	Gomile; Gomile		Radetina, Rožaje	
47	Crkvište; Crkvište		Radetina, Rožaje	
48	Latin cemetery near school Latinsko groblje kod škole		Biševo, Rožaje	
49	Graveyard; Groblje		Mukovići, Rožaje	
50	Biševo mosque Biševska džamija		Biševo, Rožaje	
51	Humka; Humka		Gospođin vrh, Rožaje	
52	Upper Humke; Gornje Humke		Rožaje	
53	Humke; Humke		Old village of Crnokrpe, Rožaje	
54	Old graveyard Staro groblje		Vuča, Rožaje	
55	Graveyard; Groblje		Vuča, Rožaje	
56	Object and a graveyard Objekat i groblje		Gornja Crnča, Rožaje	
57	Graveyard; Groblje		Malindubrava, Rožaje	
58	Greek cemetery Grčko groblje		Sokolovac, Rožaje	
59	Humka; Humka		Sokolovac, Rožaje	
60	Active Islamic graveyard Aktivno islamsko groblje		Pripeč, Rožaje	
61	Greek cemetery Grčko groblje		Bać, Pripeč, Rožaje	
62	Kurtanovska glavica Kurtanovska glavica		Pripeč, Rožaje	
63	Grac; Grac		Rožaje	
64	Graveyard under Grac; Groblje ispod Graca		Rožaje	
65	Old village Staro naselje		Rožaje	
66	Grave on the road to Crnča; Grob na putu ka Crnči		Rožaje	
67	Church "Ružice"; Crkve "Ružice"		Crkvine, Rožaje	
68	Humka; Humka		Kraljevo, Rožaje	
69	Remains of a drywall Ostaci suhozida		Brezovačko brdo, Rožaje	
70	Crkvina; Crkvina		Lučice, Rožaje	
71	Musas pit Musina jama		Rožaje	
72	Humka; Humka		Goli brijeg, Rožaje	
73	Selims grave Selimov grob		Klanac, Rožaje	
74	Crkvina; Crkvina		Klanac, Rožaje	
75	Cave in Klanac; Pećina u Klancu		Klanac, Rožaje	
76	Greek cemetery Grčko groblje		Bašča, Rožaje	
77	The remains of the altar table Ostaci časne trpeze		Bašča, Rožaje	
78	Greek cemetery Grčko groblje		Bać, Rožaje	
79	Crkvina; Crkvina		Gornja Crnča, Rožaje	
80	Old graveyard Staro groblje		Seošnica, Rožaje	
81	Tower "Gusinjac"; Kula "Gusinjac"		Rožaje	
82	Agovići tower Kula Agovića		Rožaje	
83	The tower of Amir Sutović; Kula Amira Sutovića		Seošnica, Rožaje	
84	Old graveyard Staro groblje		Rožaje	
85	The tower of Omer Agić; Kula Omera Agića		Rožaje	
86	The blockhouse of Šefkija Bećiragić; Čardak Šefkije Bećiragića		Rožaje	
87	Humke; Humke		Rudine, Rožaje	
88	Hadžijalijagići tower Kula Hadžijalijagića		Rožaje	
89	The tower of Ćerim Zejnelagić; Kula Ćerima Zejnelagića		Rožaje	
90	The house of Elmaz Fetahović; Kuća Elmaza Fetahovića		Rožaje	
91	Sultan Murat II Mosque; Džamija Sultan Murat II		Rožaje, Rožaje	It was built by the Sultan of the Ottoman Empire, Murat II in 1450. It was rebuilt in 2008.
92	Kučanska Mosque; Kučanska džamija		Rožaje, Rožaje	Built in 1830, preserved in its original form.
93	The tower of Iljaz Halilović; Kula Iljaza Halilovića		Rožaje	
94	The tower of Arif Halilovića; Kula Arifa Halilovića		Rožaje	
95	The tower of Suljo Dacić; Kula Sulja Dacića		Rožaje	
96	The house of Ismet Feleć; Kuća Ismeta Feleća		Rožaje	
97	Graveyard; Groblje		Ibarac, Rožaje	

== See also ==
- Sultan Murat II Mosque
- Kučanska Mosque
