= Bogaje =

Bogaje Богаје
- Village
- Location within Montenegro
- Country: Montenegro
- Municipality: Rožaje

Population (2011)
  - Total: 198
- Time zone: UTC+1 (CET)
  - Summer (DST): UTC+2 (CEST)

Bogaje (Serbian Cyrillic: Богаје), formerly known as Bogaji (Богаји), is a village in the municipality of Rožaje, Montenegro.

== Demographics ==
According to the 2003 census, it had 222 inhabitants, who identified as a majority of Serbs (59,45%) and minorities of Bosniaks (23,42%), Montenegrins (13,96%) and ethnic Muslims (3,15%).

According to the 2011 census, its population was 198.

Ethnicity in 2011
| Ethnicity | Number | Percentage |
|---|---|---|
| Serbs | 149 | 75.3% |
| Bosniaks | 25 | 12.6% |
| Montenegrins | 18 | 9.1% |
| other/undeclared | 6 | 3.0% |
| Total | 198 | 100% |
