= Bašča =

Bašće Башче
- Village
- Location within Montenegro
- Country: Montenegro
- Municipality: Rožaje

Population (2011)
  - Total: 141
- Time zone: UTC+1 (CET)
  - Summer (DST): UTC+2 (CEST)

Bašće (Serbian Cyrillic: Башче) is a village in the municipality of Rožaje, Montenegro.

== Demographics ==
According to the 2011 census, its population was 141.

Ethnicity in 2011
| Ethnicity | Number | Percentage |
|---|---|---|
| Serbs | 97 | 68.8% |
| Montenegrins | 44 | 31.2% |
| Total | 141 | 100% |
