= Koljeno =

Koljeno Кољено Kolena
- Village
- Location within Montenegro
- Country: Montenegro
- Municipality: Rožaje

Population (2011)
  - Total: 691
- Time zone: UTC+1 (CET)
  - Summer (DST): UTC+2 (CEST)

Koljeno (Serbian Cyrillic: Кољено; Albanian: Kolena) is a village in the municipality of Rožaje, Montenegro.

== Demographics ==
According to the 2011 census, its population was 691.

Ethnicity in 2011
Ethnicity	Number	Percentage
Bosniaks	581	84.1%
Albanians	72	10.4%
other/undeclared	38	5.5%
Total	691	100%
