= Sultan Murat II Mosque =

Mosque in Rožaje, Montenegro

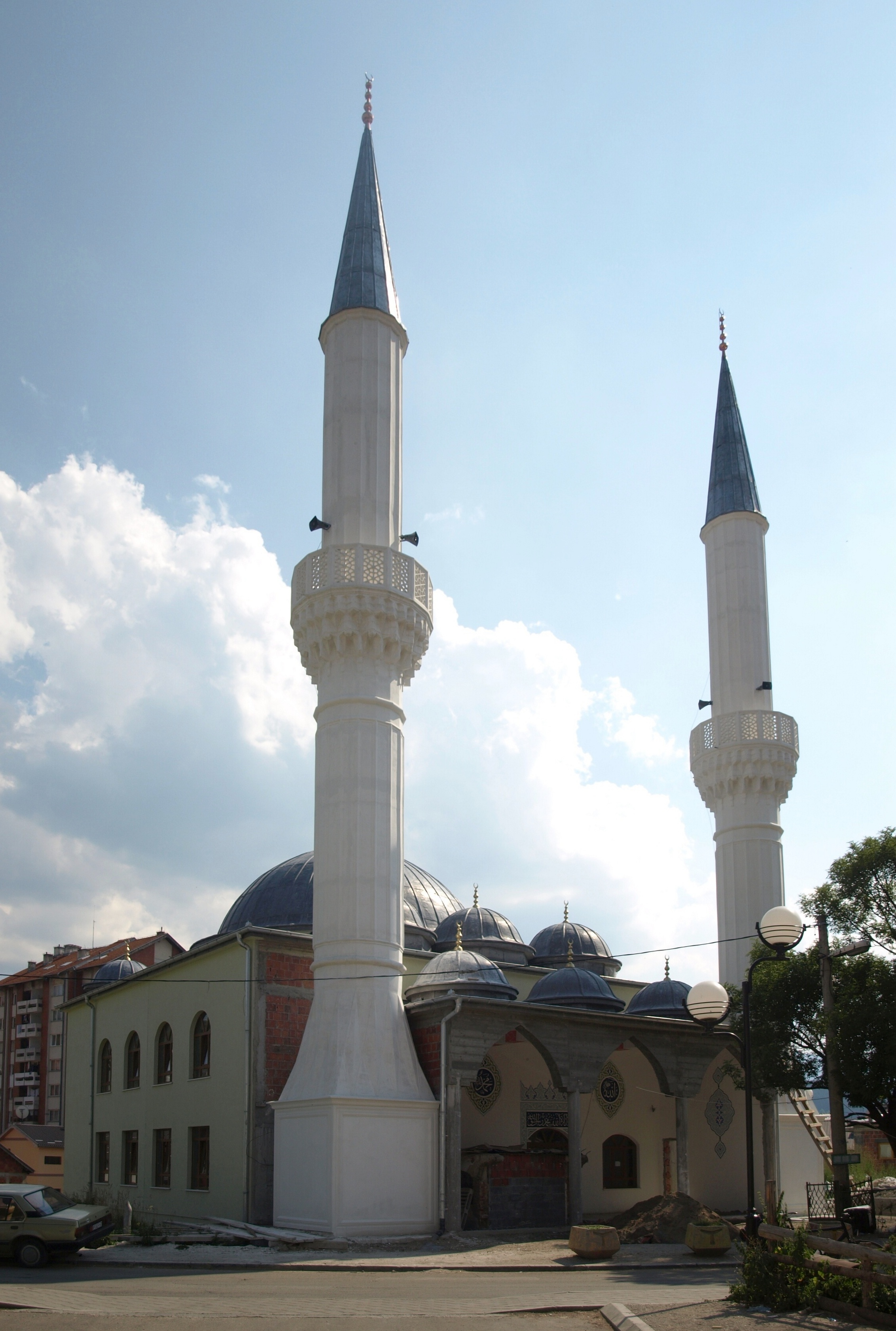
- Sultan Murat II Mosque at the end of the latest reconstruction

Religion
- Affiliation: Sunni Islam
- Status: Active

Location
- Location: Rožaje, Montenegro
- Interactive map of Sultan Murat II Mosque
- Coordinates: 42°50′40″N 20°10′00″E

Architecture
- Style: Ottoman architecture
- Completed: 1450 (original); 2008 (current)

Specifications
- Dome: 5
- Minarets: 1 (original); 2 (current)
- Materials: bricks

Sultan Murat II Mosque (Serbian: Џамија Султан Мурат II, romanized: Džamija Sultan Murat II) is the biggest mosque in Rožaje and the biggest mosque in Montenegro. It was built at the same time as the nearby fortress by the Sultan of the Ottoman Empire, Murat II in 1450. It was rebuilt in 2008.

== Reconstructions ==
Primarily, it was built in the style of old houses in Rožaje in 1450 and then reconstructed by the Islamic Council in 1967. The mosque has a turbe, built by the order of Hurshid-pasha Bagdadli in 1854 on the tomb of Muhamed Užičanin, a famous Bosniak writer and fighter for justice, who was murdered by janissaries in 1750 in the village of Balotići in Rožaje as evidenced by the inscription in verses dedicated to him.

=== Present form ===
In 2005, the ambassador of Turkey in Serbia and Montenegro Servet Oktem donated €65,000 to the president of the municipality of Rožaje for the reconstruction of the Sultan Murat II Mosque.

== See also ==
- Kučanska Mosque
- Hfz. Abdurahman Kujević
- Immovable cultural property of Rožaje
