= Gornja Lovnica =

Gornja Lovnica Горња Ловница
- Village
- Location within Montenegro
- Country: Montenegro
- Municipality: Rožaje

Population (2011)
  - Total: 361
- Time zone: UTC+1 (CET)
  - Summer (DST): UTC+2 (CEST)

Gornja Lovnica (Serbian Cyrillic: Горња Ловница) is a village in the municipality of Rožaje, Montenegro.

== Demographics ==
According to the 2011 census, its population was 361.

Ethnicity in 2011
| Ethnicity | Number | Percentage |
|---|---|---|
| Bosniaks | 337 | 93.4% |
| Albanians | 11 | 3.0% |
| other/undeclared | 13 | 3.6% |
| Total | 361 | 100% |
