= Abdurahman Kujević =

Hafiz Abdurahman Kujević
- Born: June 21, 1982 (age 43); Rožaje, SFR Yugoslavia
- Occupation(s): Professor at IU Novi Pazar and W madrasa in Rožaje
- Organization: Islamic Community in Rožaje
- Movement: Hanafi School

Hafiz Abdurahman Kujević is one of the most influential religious leaders in Sandžak. He lives in Rožaje, Montenegro where he works as the assistant of the Sandžak mufti for South Sandžak.

== Biography ==
Kujević was born on 21 June 1982 to Bosniak parents Mustafa and Fatima. He is from Balotiće in Rožaje. He finished primary school in his hometown in 1997 and in the same year he enrolled in the Gazi Isa-beg madrasa in Novi Pazar. He finished madrasa in 2001. At the end of his studying he was informed that he was admitted on the Islamic University of Madinah. In Madinah, he appointed to the Institution for learning Arabic. He continued with the Faculty of Hadith and Islamic Science, graduating in 2006.

He recited the Qur'an in front of a qari (reciter of the Qur'an) in Al-Masjid an-Nabawi, shaykh Abdurrahman Yusuf ibn Jevde ibn Yasin Eddavudijj. After he recited the khatma in front of this shaykh and passed several exams from various Qur'anic disciplines he got the ijjazetnama for reciting and teaching the Qur'an. Hafiz Abdurahman Kujević is the first hafiz with the ijjazetnama on the territory of Montenegro. Hafiz Kujević in addition to the Qur'an knows also the shortened version of the hadith collections Sahih al-Bukhari and Sahih Muslim. After finishing studies he activates through the Islamic Community in Rožaje. Weekly, he organizes lessons from various disciplines, khutbas in all mosques in Rožaje, classes for learning the Qur'an and Arabic and courses for learning the Arabic language. He works as a professor at the International University in Novi Pazar and as a professor at the women's madrasa in Rožaje. He lives in Rožaje.

== See also ==
- Kučanska Mosque
- Sultan Murat II Mosque
