= FK Ibar =

Montenegrin football club

FK Ibar Rožaje
- Full name: Fudbalski klub Ibar Rožaje
- Founded: 1938; 88 years ago
- Ground: Bandžovo Brdo Stadium, Rožaje
- Capacity: 3,000
- President: (Montenegro) Sabahatin Hodžić
- Head Coach: (Bosnia and Herzegovina) Salim Duraković
- League: Montenegrin Third League
- 2024–25: Montenegrin Second League, 9th of 9 (relegated via play-offs)
Home colours	Away colours

Active sport clubs of Ibar
Football	Basketball	Volleyball
Judo	Table Tennis	Karate
Fishing	Chess	Hunting

FK Ibar is a football club from Rožaje, Montenegro. They currently compete in the Montenegrin Third League. FK Ibar is a part of the Ibar sport society from Rožaje. The club is named after the river Ibar, longest river from Montenegro, which originates in Rožaje. Founded in 1938, FK Ibar is the oldest sports club from Rožaje.

== History ==
FK Ibar was founded in 1938 in Rožaje, Kingdom of Yugoslavia. The biggest successes of the club are known after 1992 when the club played in the Second League of FR Yugoslavia. In the 1999–2000 Second League of FR Yugoslavia, Ibar played in the West division, and finished 17th with 29 points out of 34 matches. Two years later, they played again in the Second Division finishing last in the South Group. On the all-time table for the Second Division from 1992 to 2002 FK Ibar is positioned 67th with 114 points. After the independence of Montenegro, the club played found itself as a member of the Montenegrin Second League. In the first season in 2006/07 they played their best season in the history of the club. FK Ibar finished third with 63 points, six points less from the Second Division champion FK Lovćen, reaching the play-offs. In the last rounds of the league they lost a home match against FK Lovćen, incidents happened on and off the stadium in Rožaje. They lost their ticket for the First League and were not allowed to play in Rožaje during the play-offs against FK Dečić due to the decision of FSCG. In the Montenegrin Cup, the club played the 1/8 of final in 2007/08.

Country	Season	League	Position	Points
(Federal Republic of Yugoslavia)	1999-00.	Second League	17	29
(Federal Republic of Yugoslavia)	2001-02.	Second League	12	13
(Montenegro)	2006-07.	Second League	3	63
(Montenegro)	2007-08.	Second League	5	49
(Montenegro)	2008-09.	Second League	5	50
(Montenegro)	2009-10.	Second League	9	37
(Montenegro)	2010-11.	Second League	7	44
(Montenegro)	2011-12.	Second League	10	38
(Montenegro)	2012-13.	Second League	8	33

== Supporters ==
Ibar fans are known as Gazije (from Arabic: ghāzī or ghazah, gazi; from ghazw, plural: ghazawāt; meaning 'armed incursion with the intention of conquering'. Gazije were the defenders of Islam in the period of the Ottoman Empire.) The group's traditional colors are black and white, which are also the colours of FK Ibar where Gazije first started giving their support. After the club failed to reach the Montenegrin First League in 2006, 2007 and 2008, the club lost the support of fans since they failed to win the away play-off match against FK Dečić for a place in the Montenegrin First League. The basketball club KK Ibar was first time supported by a big group of supporters in the first matches of Erste League in 2012.

== Stadium ==
FK Ibar play their home matches at Stadion Bandžovo Brdo, in Rožaje. The stadium has western and southern stands. The capacity cannot be precisely shown since the stands are without seats. On the most important matches, the number of spectators went up to 5,000. The stadium has an olympic track rebuilt in 2004 when Rožaje was the host of Sandžačke Igre(Sandžak Games), nowadays MOSI. In the near future, the stadium will be reconstructed. The location of the stadium is next to the Sports Center Rožaje addressed on Carine bb.

== Players ==
=== Current squad ===
As of 29 September 2025

Note: Flags indicate national team as defined under FIFA eligibility rules; some limited exceptions apply. Players may hold more than one non-FIFA nationality.

No.	Pos.	Nation	Player
2	DF	MNE	Mito Sekularac
4	DF	MNE	Boka Magdelinic
5	DF	SRB	Jupo Hadzijalijagic
6	MF	MNE	Muma Muric
7	MF	MNE	Mekan Murić
8	MF	MNE	Rito Sinanovic
9	FW	MNE	Hulja Pepic
11	MF	MNE	Edison Berisa
12	GK	MNE	Pipo Kalac
13	DF	MNE	Murat Ramovic
14	MF	MNE	Nail Muric

No.	Pos.	Nation	Player
15	MF	JPN	Dzibo Kalac
16	DF	MNE	Said Djozovic
17	FW	MNE	Dzemal Hadzic
18	DF	MNE	Nikola Bulatovic
19	FW	MNE	Ljaljo Kaplanov
20	DF	MNE	Samed Pepić
21	MF	MNE	Bojan Vlaović
23	MF	JPN	Shunya Ueda
26	MF	MNE	Muamer Lukač
27	GK	MNE	Danis Muković
31	MF	MNE	Maid Murić
32	MF	MNE	Mirza Murić

=== Notable players ===
For all former and current players with a Wikipedia article, please see Category:FK Ibar players.

Below is the list of players which, during their career, played for FK Ibar and represented their countries at national teams and U-21 teams or foreign players which made an international career.

- (Montenegro) Medo Juković

== See also ==
- KK Ibar
- OK Ibar
