= Grižice =

Grižice Грижице
- Village
- Location within Montenegro
- Country: Montenegro
- Municipality: Rožaje

Population (2011)
  - Total: 409
- Time zone: UTC+1 (CET)
  - Summer (DST): UTC+2 (CEST)

Grižice (Serbian Cyrillic: Грижице) is a village in the municipality of Rožaje, Montenegro.

== Demographics ==
According to the 2011 census, its population was 409.

Ethnicity in 2011
Ethnicity	Number	Percentage
Bosniaks	252	61.6%
Serbs	129	31.5%
Montenegrins	10	2.4%
other/undeclared	18	4.4%
Total	409	100%
