= Bajram Balota =

Albanian insurgent

Bajram Balota was an Albanian guerrilla leader from Balotići, Rožaje. He was called to settle many conflicts and function as a Muslihun since he was a well-known member of the local Muslim community (judicial mediator). During World War I, he headed a force of irregulars in the territory held by Austria-Hungary in Montenegro around Berane and Rožaje. He and his allies persecuted and killed Orthodox Montenegrins. His movement was dissolved following a defeat by Austro-Hungarian soldiers on 18 June.
