= Ernad Sabotic =

Luxembourgish footballer

Personal information
- Date of birth: 23 October 1979 (age 47)
- Place of birth: Rožaje, SFR Yugoslavia
- Height: 1.71 m (5 ft 7 in)
- Position: Midfielder

Senior career*
Years	Team	Apps	(Gls)
1998–2009	Jeunesse Esch		
2010	Swift Hesperange		
2010–2014	Käerjéng		
2014–2015	Union Luxembourg		
2015–2016	Yellow Boys		
2016–2017	Berdenia Berbourg		
2017–2019	CS Grevenmacher		

International career
2005	Luxembourg	4	(0)
- * Club domestic league appearances and goals

Ernad Sabotic (born 23 October 1979) is a retired Luxembourgish football midfielder.
