= Kučanska Mosque =

Mosque in Rožaje, Montenegro

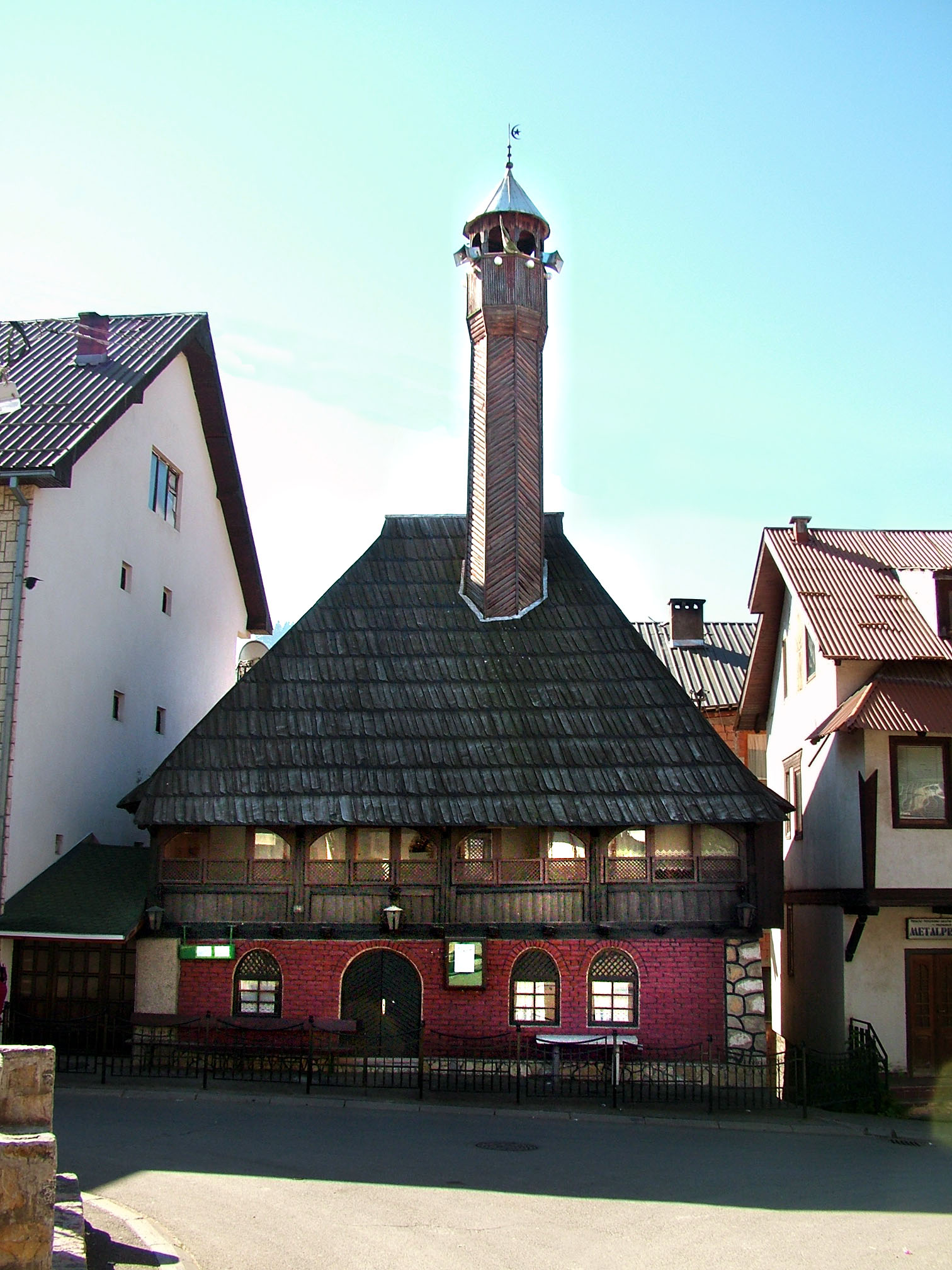

Religion
- Affiliation: Islam
- Status: Active

Location
- Location: Rožaje, Montenegro
- Interactive map of Kučanska Mosque
- Coordinates: 42°50′41″N 20°10′11″E

Architecture
- Style: Ottoman architecture
- Completed: 1830

Specifications
- Minaret: 1
- Materials: wood

Kučanska Mosque (Bosnian: Kučanska džamija) is a part of the cultural Heritage of Rožaje. It was built in 1830. by the believers of the Kučanska mahalla which is named after their area of origin, the Kuči region. It is preserved in its original form unlike some other mosques in Rožaje. The ground on which the mosque is built is given from one of the most influential persons in the history of Rožaje, Jakup ef. Kardović.

== Structure ==
The structure of the mosque has a standard base used for mosques in this area and a timber gallery, roof, and minaret of wood. The wood is recorded as being borovina (pine). The mosque has gone through a number of renovations and the open gallery enclosed with glazing. Still, the most was preserved in form as it was built.

== See also ==
- Sultan Murat II Mosque
- Hfz. Abdurahman Kujević
- Immovable cultural property of Rožaje
