= Bijela Crkva =

Bijela Crkva Бијела Црква
- Village
- Location within Montenegro
- Country: Montenegro
- Municipality: Rožaje

Population (2011)
  - Total: 183
- Time zone: UTC+1 (CET)
  - Summer (DST): UTC+2 (CEST)

Bijela Crkva (Serbian Cyrillic: Бијела Црква; lit. White Church) is a village in the municipality of Rožaje, Montenegro.

== Demographics ==
According to the 2003 census, it had 195 inhabitants, who identified as a majority of Serbs (88%) and minority of Montenegrins (11%).

According to the 2011 census, its population was 183.

Ethnicity in 2011
| Ethnicity | Number | Percentage |
|---|---|---|
| Serbs | 148 | 80.9% |
| Montenegrins | 31 | 16.9% |
| other/undeclared | 4 | 2.2% |
| Total | 183 | 100% |

== See also ==
- Bela Crkva (disambiguation)
