= Hajla e Shkrelit =

Mountain peak in Kosovo and Montenegro

Coordinates: 42°46′28.5″N 20°5′14.0″E

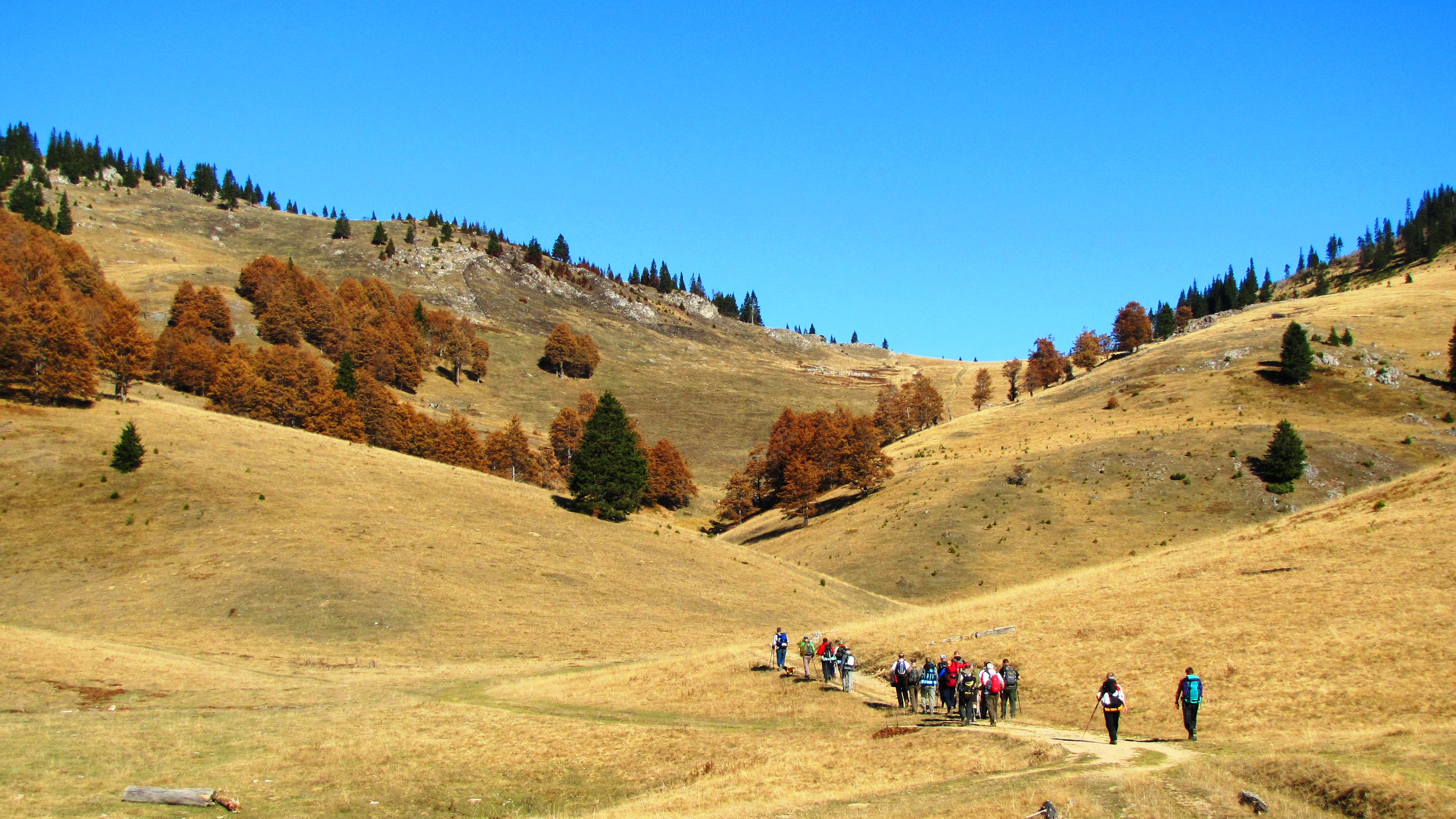

Highest point
- Elevation: 2,011 m (6,598 ft)

Geography
- Location within Kosovo
- Location: Peja
- Countries: Kosovo; Montenegro
- Parent range: Albanian Alps

Hajla e Shkrelit is a mountain peak in Kosovo and Montenegro. It reaches a height of 2,011 m (6,598 ft) and is part of the Hajla mountain in the Accursed Mountains. Its location in the Hajla mountain is in the far west.
