= Balotići =

Balotići Балотићи
- Village
- Location within Montenegro
- Country: Montenegro
- Municipality: Rožaje

Population (2011)
  - Total: 685
- Time zone: UTC+1 (CET)
  - Summer (DST): UTC+2 (CEST)

Balotići (Serbian Cyrillic: Балотићи) is a village in the municipality of Rožaje, Montenegro.

== Demographics ==
According to the 2011 census, its population was 685.

Ethnicity in 2011
Ethnicity	Number	Percentage
Bosniaks	655	95.6%
other/undeclared	30	4.4%
Total	685	100%

== Notable people ==
Bajram Balota
