= Radetina =

Radetina Радетина
- Village
- Location within Montenegro
- Country: Montenegro
- Municipality: Rožaje

Population (2011)
  - Total: 394
- Time zone: UTC+1 (CET)
  - Summer (DST): UTC+2 (CEST)

Radetina (Serbian Cyrillic: Радетина) is a village in the municipality of Rožaje, Montenegro.

== Demographics ==
According to the 2011 census, its population was 394, all but three of them Bosniaks.
