= Lake Rujište =

Lake in Montenegro

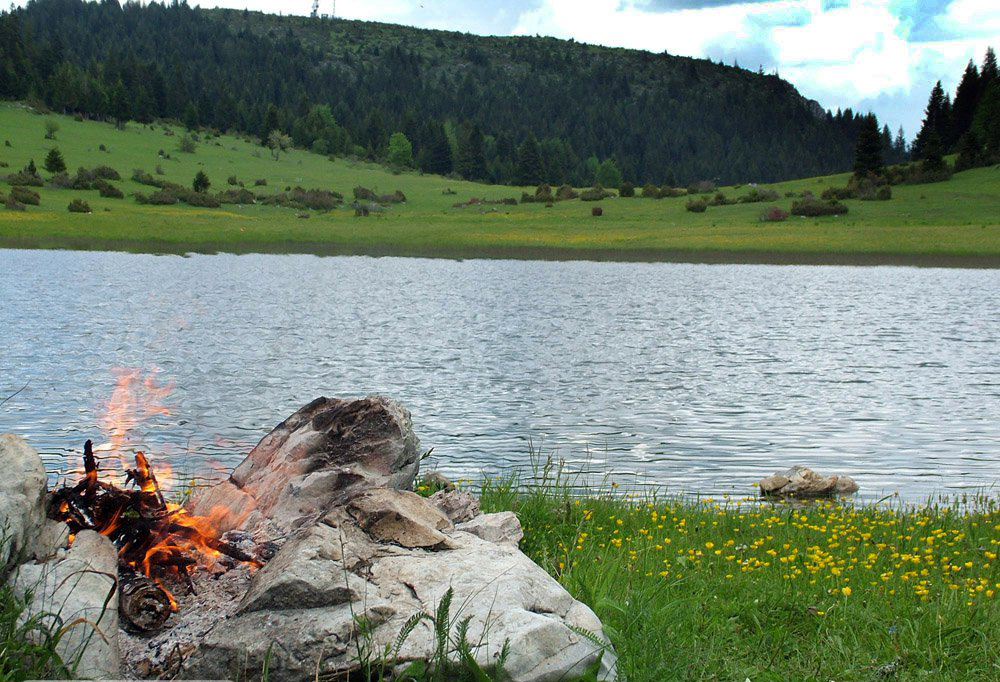

- Location within Montenegro
- Location: Rožaje, Montenegro
- Coordinates: 42°54′42″N 20°11′05″E
- Basin countries: Montenegro

Lake Rujište (Serbian: Језеро Рујиште, romanized: Jezero Rujište) is a lake located in Biševo, a local center in Rožaje, Montenegro. The potentials of this lake are still not fully realized. This lake is one of the most visited natural locations in Rožaje. Next to the lake is an alp called Gospođin Vrh. The area where this lake is located is called Rujišta and for the future it has planned for a golf course with suitable facilities.

== See also ==
- Vrelo Ibra
