= Besnik Lajçi =

KLA General

Coordinates: 42°46′N 20°49′E

- Born: 24 June 1971; Pejë, Kosovo
- Died: 19 April 1999 (aged 27) Hajla, Rugova
- Allegiance: Kosova
- Branch: Kosovo Liberation Army
- Service years: 1997–1999
- Rank: general
- Commands: Rugova
- Conflicts: Kosovo War • Battle of Hajla Pass †
- Awards: Hero of Kosovo

Besnik Lajçi (24 August 1971 – 19 April 1999) was an Albanian and Kosovo Liberation Army fighter from the Rugova region of Peja, Kosovo. He was one of the main generals of the 163rd "Rugova" brigade which fought in the Kosovo War.

== Life ==
Besnik Lajçi was born on 24 August 1971 in Peja to his parents Musë and Rabe Lajçi. He completed his early education in the "8 marsi" school in Peja and completed highschool in "Bedri Pejani" Highschool. He completed his university studies for Philosophy and Albanian literature in the University of Pristina.

He was one of the first KLA fighters in the Rugova region, together with Salih and Selman Lajçi. Together they formed the "Shtabi Rajonal of Rugova" in 1997. Besnik Lajçi was a lead figure in the KLA's weapon smuggling. He also had a big role in the creation of the 163rd "Rugova" brigade, after which he became a general of Rugova's scouting unit.

== Death ==
On 19 April Yugoslav forces reached Besnik Lajçi's position and injured him. Upon his injury, taking advantage of the gunfire of his fellow troops Salih Lajçi and Imer Nikçi, he charged at Yugoslav forces going in-between their lines killing dozens of soldiers before falling to his injuries. Upon seeing this, the Yugoslav forces retreated from Hajla.

== Legacy ==
Besnik Lajçi's sacrifice and leadership ultimately led him to winning the "Hero of Kosovo" award, which he would receive from Hashim Thaçi who was president at the time.

He was also decorated with the "Honour of the nation" award by the Albanian president at the time Ilir Meta.
