= Hajla =

Mountain in Kosovo and Montenegro

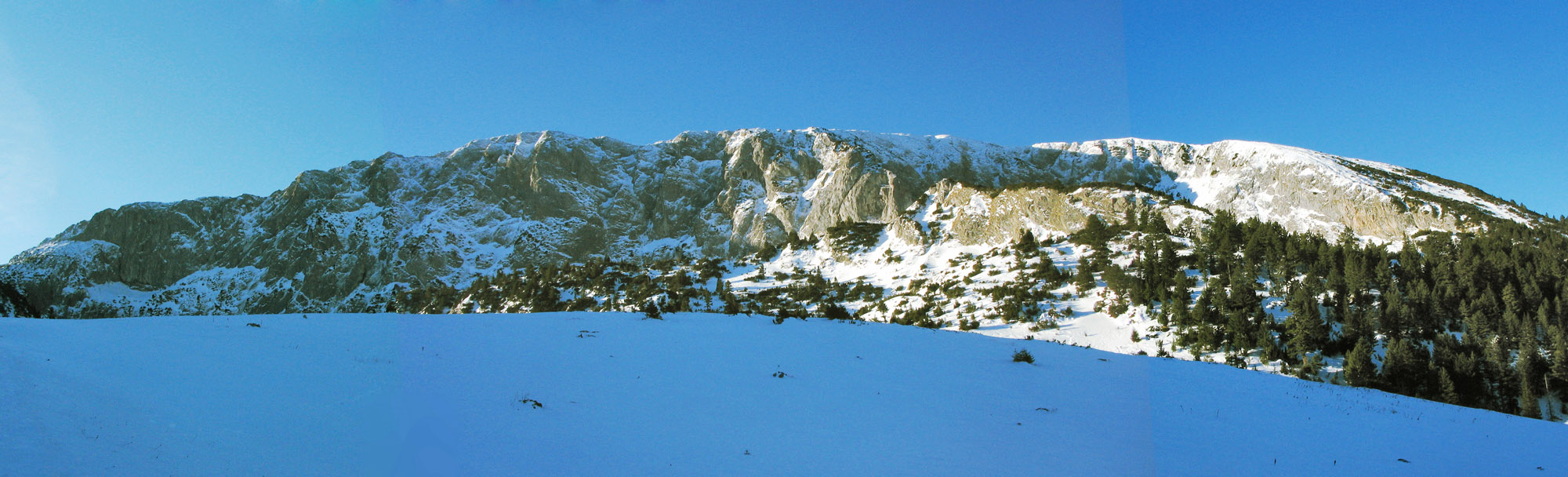
- Panorama

Highest point
- Elevation: 2,403 m (7,884 ft)
- Coordinates: 42°46′24″N 20°16′21″E

Geography
- Location within Kosovo Location within Montenegro
- Countries: Kosovo and Montenegro

Climbing
- Easiest route: Pejë-Pepaj or Rožaje-Bandžov-Dermandol

Hajla (Albanian: Hajlë or Hajla; Serbian Cyrillic: Хајла) is a mountain located between the borders of Kosovo and Montenegro. It has several peaks that reach over 2,000 m (6,562 ft), the tallest with a hight of 2,403 m (7,884 ft). The northern slopes contains the spring formation of the Ibar river, and to its southern slopes is the origin of the Bistrica e Pejës (or the Pećka Bistrica) river. Hajla is also the tallest mountain in the northern part of the Accursed Mountains of the Balkans. In Kosovo, Hajla forms part of the 25 km (16 mi) long Rugova Canyon. The closest city to Hajla is Rožaje, in Montenegro.

== Highest peaks ==
- Hajla (2,403 m or 7,884 ft)
- Hajla e Vëranocit (2,281 m or 7,484 ft)
- Maja Dramadol (2,120 m or 6,955 ft)
- Hajla e Shkrelit (2,011 m or 6,598 ft)

== History ==
=== Kosovo War ===
On 17 April 1999 the Yugoslav military began their offensive in the Rugova region. They would initially attempt to capture the village of Greater Shtupeç, where the 163rd "Rugova" brigade was located. On 18 April they reached Mt.Hajla which stood as a defense of Greater Shtupeç. The KLA positions were attacked by a stronger force. After some fighting, the first casualty of the 163rd Rugova brigade of the Kosovo War fell in battle, that being Xhavit Lajçi. After further fighting the Yugoslav forces would advance in Hajla and would kill KLA fighter Ramush Lajçi. General Selman Lajçi and 2 other soldiers would go to pick up Ramush Lajçi's corpse but while doing this Selman Lajçi was shot and wounded fatally falling to the ground. His last words would be "Be careful" which he told his fellow soldiers which retreated back, as commander Selman Lajçi would die from his injury. On the 19th of April Yugoslav forces would continue pushing the KLA back in Hajla before they were brought to a stop by the KLA defensive positions. In the fierce firefight the Yugoslav army would injure general Besnik Lajçi, who upon his injury would decide to make a last ditch sacrifice to win the battle, would charge at the Yugoslav forces taking advantage of the gunfire of his fellow fighters, Salih Lajçi and Imer Nikçi, going in-between Yugoslav lines leading to casualties on the Yugoslav side being in the dozens, before he would fall to his injuries. Upon seeing this, the Yugoslav forces retreated from Hajla.

== See also ==
- Vrelo Ibra
- Ibar
