= Rožaje =

Rožaje Рожаје Rozhajë
- Town and municipality
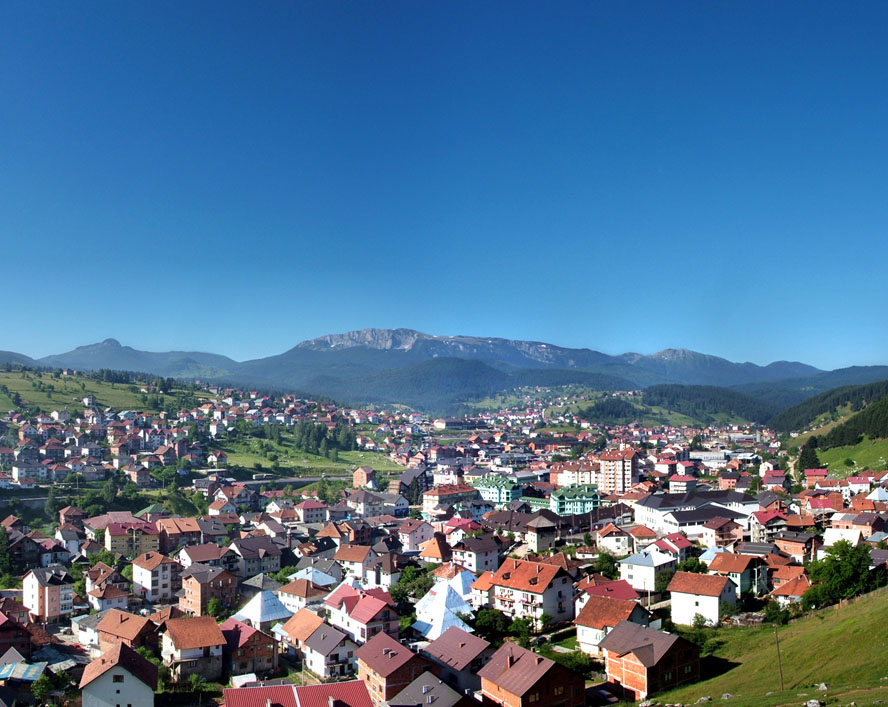
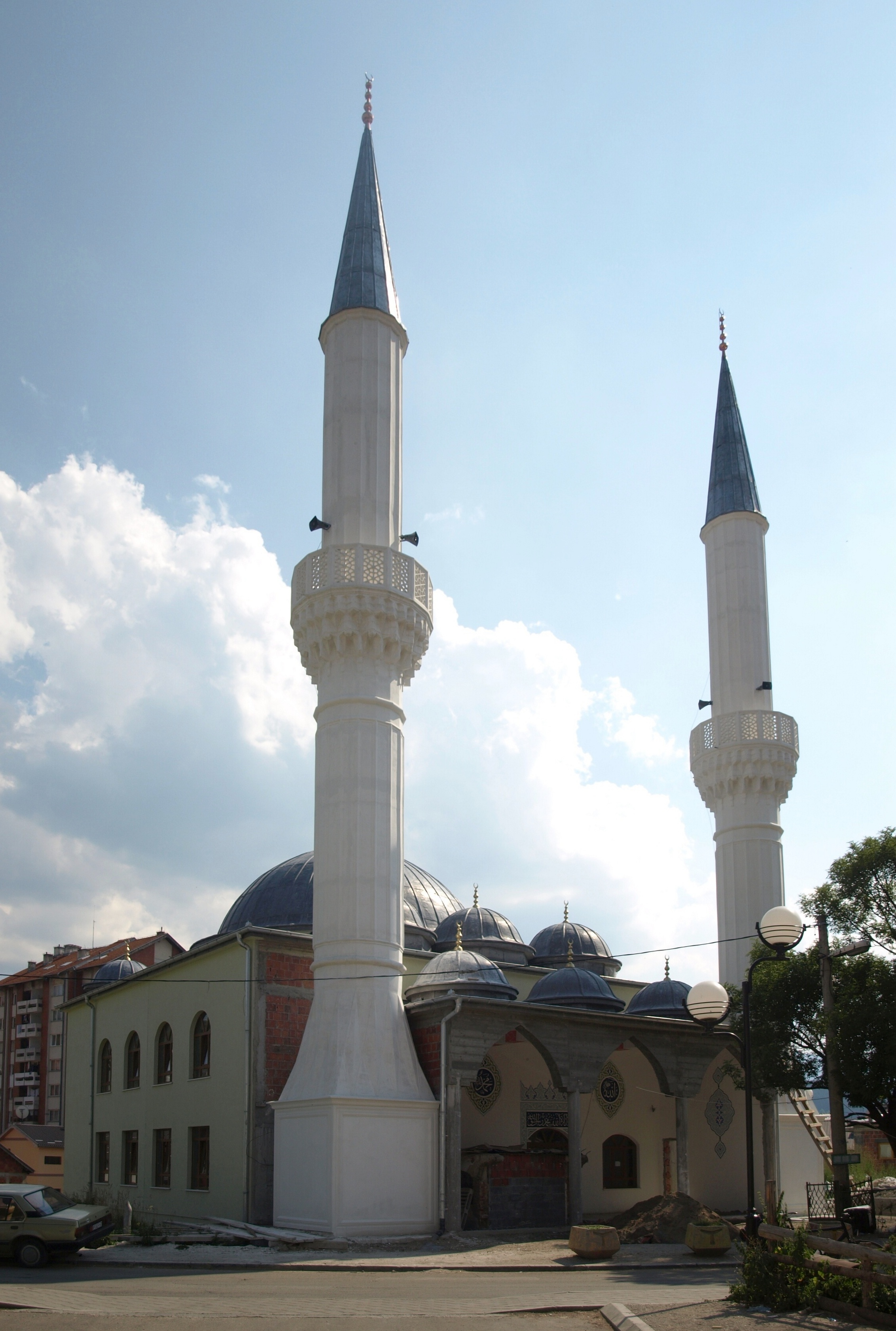
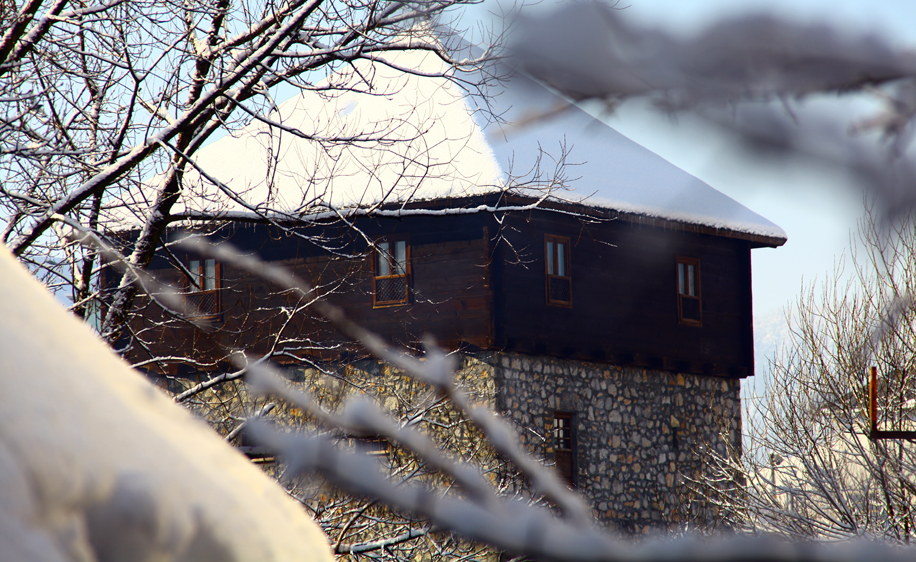
- From the top, View over the city, Sultan Murat II Mosque, Ganić Tower View of Rožaje

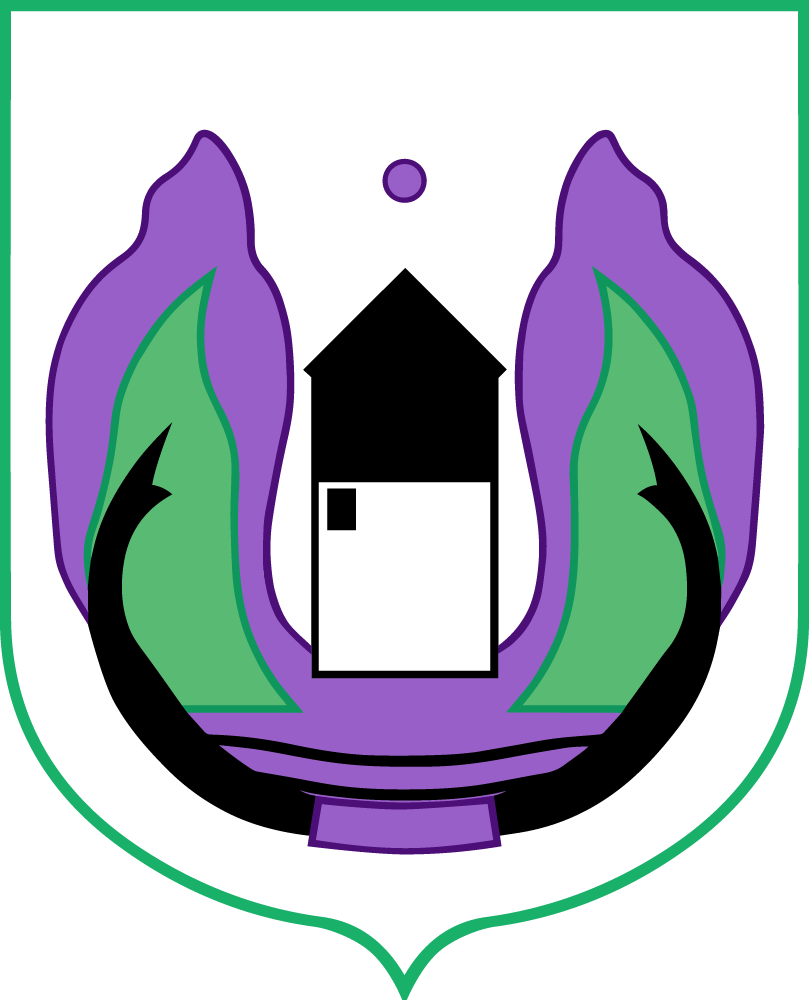
- Flag Coat of arms

- Location within Montenegro Rožaje (Europe)
- Coordinates: 42.84°N 20.16°E
- Country: Montenegro
- Region: Northern
- Municipality: Rožaje
- Settlements: 66

Government
  - Type: Mayor-Assembly
  - Mayor: Nusret Kalac (BS)

Area
  - Town and municipality: 432 km^{2} (167 sq mi)
- Elevation: 1,109 m (3,638 ft)

Population (2023)
  - Rank: 10th in Montenegro
  - Density: 53/km^{2} (140/sq mi)
  - Urban: 14,654 ▲
  - Rural: 12,968 ▲
  - Municipality: 27,622 ▲
- Demonym: Rožajci
- Time zone: UTC+1 (CET)
  - Summer (DST): UTC+2 (CEST)
- Postal code: 84310
- Area code: +382 51
- ISO 3166-2 code: ME-17
- Car plates: RO
- Climate: Cfb
- Website: www.rozaje.me

Rožaje (Montenegrin Cyrillic: Рожаје, (Note: Written identically in Serbian Cyrillic) pronounced [rɔ̂ʒajɛ]; Albanian: Rozhajë, pronounced [roʒajə]) is a town in the Northern Region of Montenegro, situated along the Ibar river. As of 20 the town had a population of 13,608 inhabitants.

Surrounded by hills to its west and mountains to its east (notably Mount Hajla), the town is divided in half by, and contains the source of the river Ibar, which gives its name to the local sports clubs KK Ibar and OK Ibar. Rožaje is the centre of the Rožaje Municipality within the 25 municipalities of Montenegro.

Rožaje celebrates its foundation day on 30 September each year.

== History ==
Rožaje was first settled in antiquity by the Illyrians. Evidence of this Illyrian settlement is located on Brezojevica Hill. Later, during the migration of the Slavs, Slavs settled in the area. Rožaje was first mentioned in 1571 and 1585. The settlement surrounding the then fort was called Trgovište, which it was called until 1912.

During the Ottoman Empire's reign over Montenegro, the Sultan Murat II Mosque was constructed in the city in the 1500s, which also contains the turbe of the sultan's body. It is considered to be the oldest mosque in the entire city.

In 1700, after the Great Serb Migration, the Albanian clans of the Kelmendi and Kuçi and other tribes like the Shkreli of Rugova established themselves in the region of Rožaje and the neighboring town of Tutin in Serbia. The Shala, Krasniqi, and Gashi also moved in the region. In the villages surrounding Rozaje, 44 Albanian families of the Kelmendi were noted in 1721 and 58 residents in Urban Rozaje itself.

In 1797, the Ganić kula, a defensive tower was built from the Muslim side of the Kuči, as they supported the Muslim authority and cultural practices, was built. Nowadays, the tower is currently the town's museum.

During World War I, the army of the Kingdom of Montenegro captured the city in 1912 from the Ottoman Empire, during the First Balkan War. Within this time, the Montenegrin Army under King Nikola quickly sought to Serbianize the population, to reduce threats of invasions or uprisings by the Albanian locals. It was officially ceded to Montenegro following the Treaty of London in 1913 that ended the war. In 1917, the local Albanian qadi Bajram Balota organised a force of irregulars in the territory held by Austria-Hungary in Montenegro around Berane and Rožaje, with his soldiers and allies persecuting and killing Orthodox Montenegrins. His movement was dissolved following a defeat by Austro-Hungarian soldiers on 18 June 1918. In 1919, after the war, Rožaje was one of the main cities that participated in an Albanian revolt, which later came to be known as the Plav Rebellion (Montenegrin: Plavska Pobuna), rising up together with the Plav and Gusinje districts and fighting against the inclusion of Sandžak in the Kingdom of Serbs, Croats and Slovenes. An estimated 700 Albanians were killed in Rožaje by the Serbian army when the rebellion was quelled. These events resulted in a large influx of Albanians migrating to Albania.

After World War II Rožaje became a part of SR Montenegro, which was ultimately a part of the SFR Yugoslavia.

During the Bosnian War, the Bosniaks of Foča who managed to escape the massacre that happened in the area resettled in Rožaje.

During the Kosovo War in 1999, around 1,000 ethnic Albanians that also managed to escape the war settled in the south of Rožaje. They were mostly from the regions of Drenica and Mitrovica.

In 2018, a replica of the Sebilj in Sarajevo has been completed and is currently displayed in the town's main square.

== Administration ==
=== City Assembly ===
Party/Coalition	Seats	Local government
Bosniak Party	21 / 34	Government
DPS, SDP, SD, LP	8 / 34	Opposition
United Reform Action	2 / 34	Opposition
SPP	2 / 34	Opposition
Independent	1 / 34	Opposition

== Geography ==
The municipality is situated on large hills, with the mountains Hajla, Mokra Gora, Ahmica, Krstac, Žljeb, Štedim and Turjak to its east and southeast. Those mountains belong to the northern part of the Accursed Mountains range. The city stands at around 1,014m or 3,326 ft above sea level.

== Demographics ==
Historical population
Year	Pop.	±%
1948	1,461	—
1953	1,813	+24.1%
1961	2,765	+52.5%
1971	5,327	+92.7%
1981	7,336	+37.7%
1991	8,828	+20.3%
2003	9,121	+3.3%
2011	9,567	+4.9%
2023	13,608	+42.2%
Population size may be affected by changes in administrative divisions.

Rožaje is the administrative centre of the Rožaje municipality, which has a total of 25,247 residents. The town of Rožaje itself has a population of 13,608 in 2023.

There are 2 major neighbourhoods within the municipality, Ibarac, and Bandžovo Brdo. Ibarac is split between Lijeva Obala Ibar and Desna Obala Ibar.

=== Ethnic groups ===
In the 2023 census 84.66% of the population were Montenegrin Bosniaks, 5.07% (1,176) Albanians, and 2.56% Montenegrin Serbs. 3.76% declared themselves as Montenegrins.

=== Languages ===
Montenegrin, Serbian, Bosnian, and Croatian are mutually intelligible as standard varieties of the Serbo-Croatian language. Like most cities and areas belonging to the Sandžak region, they speak a dialect of the Bosnian language known as "Bošnjački", with the total amount of speakers declared at 74.05%, as it is the most widely-spoken language in the city. The second most spoken language in the city is Montenegrin (16.55%), Albanian speakers amount to 4.34%, and Serbian speakers amount to 3.02% of the population. A total of 1.82% of the population have not declared their native, or primarily-spoken language.

=== Religion ===
Religion in Rožaje (2023)
1. Islam (96.5%)
2. Eastern Orthodoxy (3.08%)

== International relations ==
=== Twin towns — Sister cities ===
Rožaje is twinned with:

- Bayrampaşa, Turkey
- Betton, France
- Kavadarci, North Macedonia
- Kütahya, Turkey
- Pernik, Bulgaria
- Pfäffikon, Switzerland

== Gallery ==
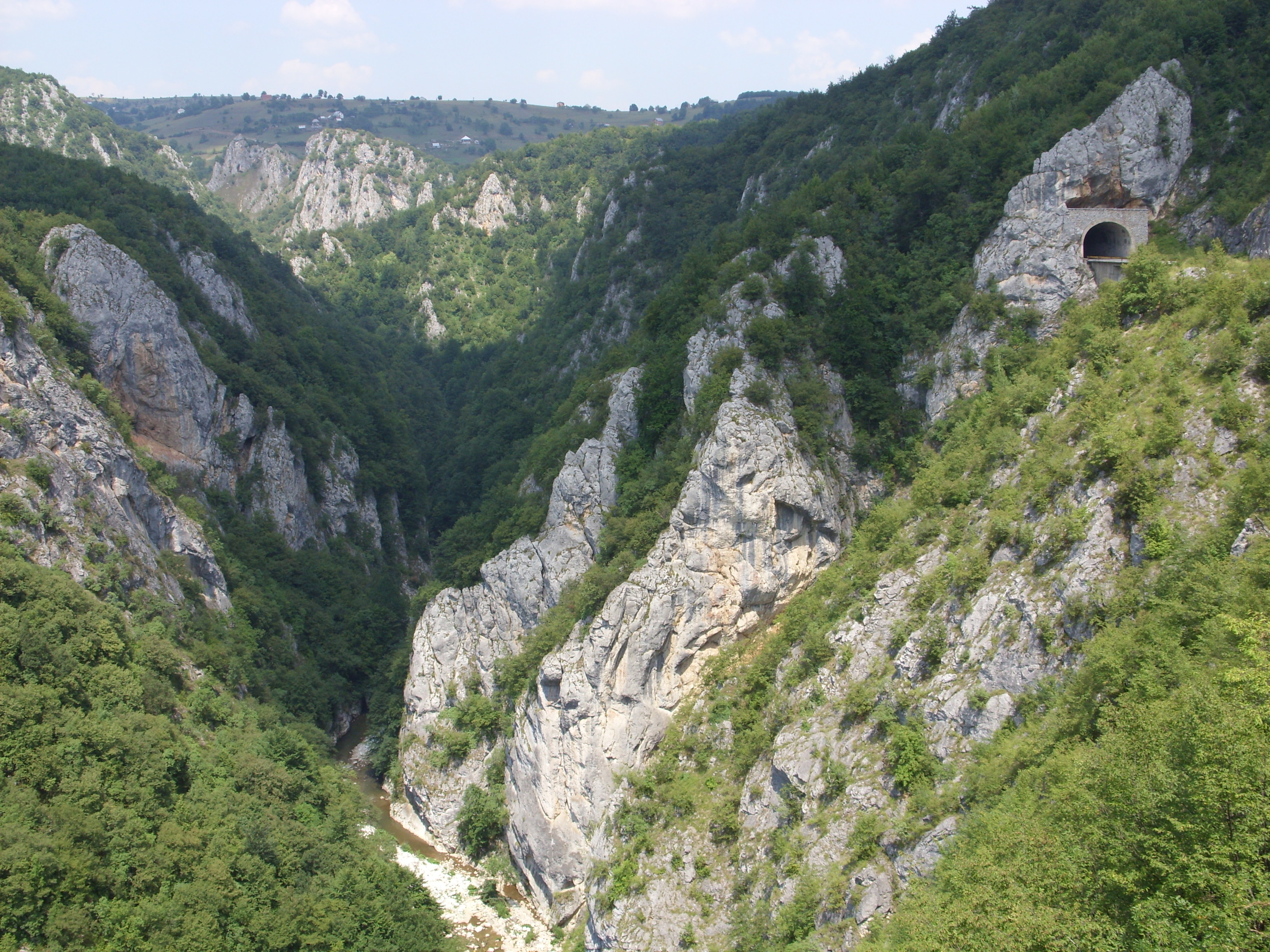
Ibar river canyon

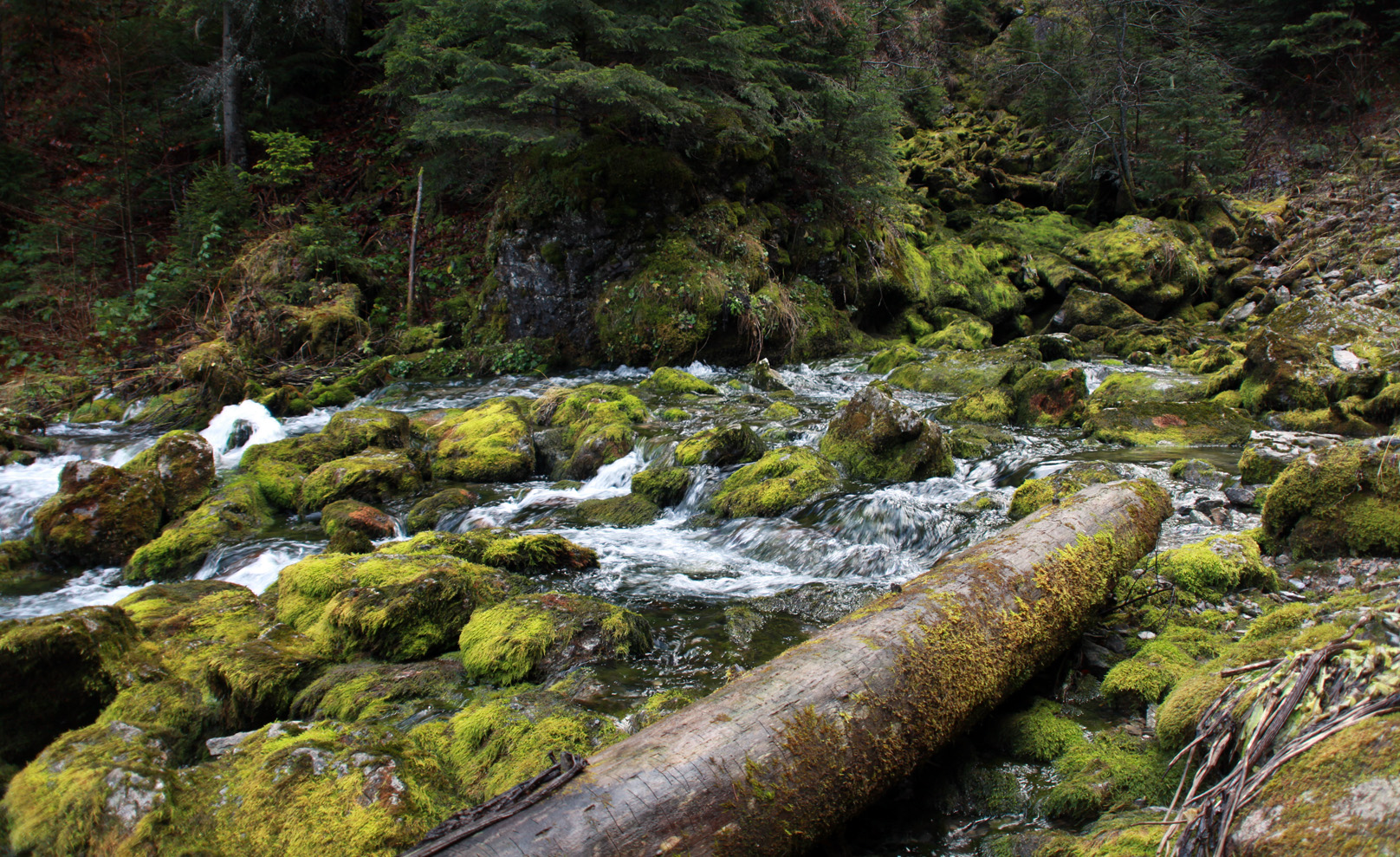
Vrelo Ibra

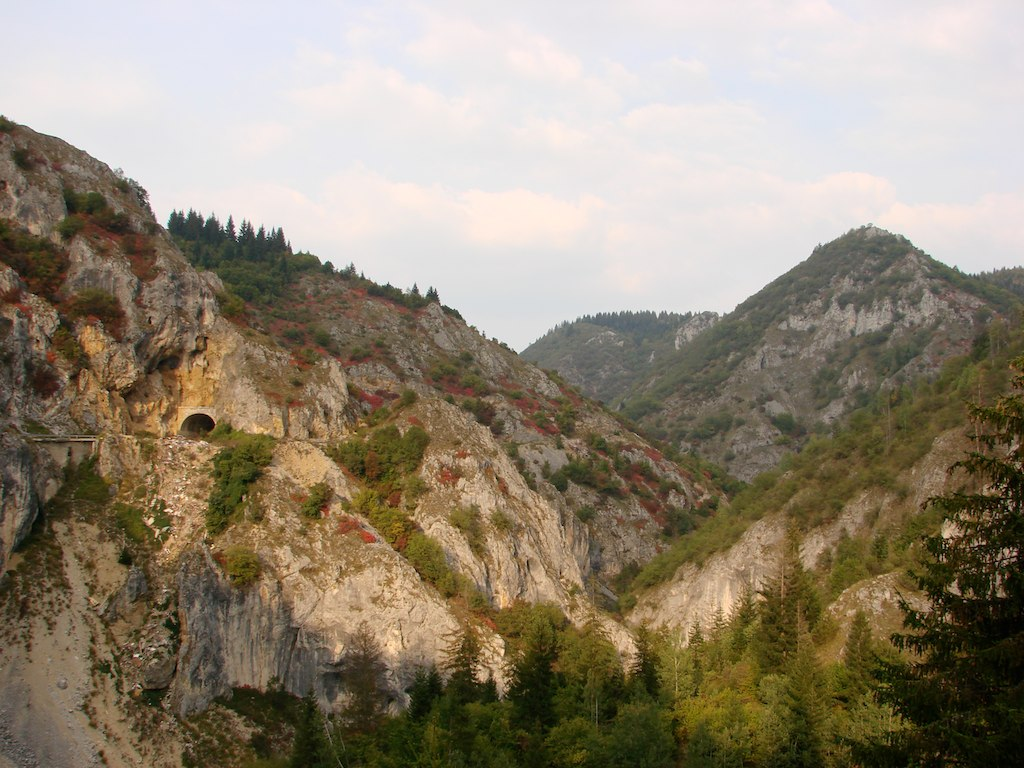
Hajla near Rožaje

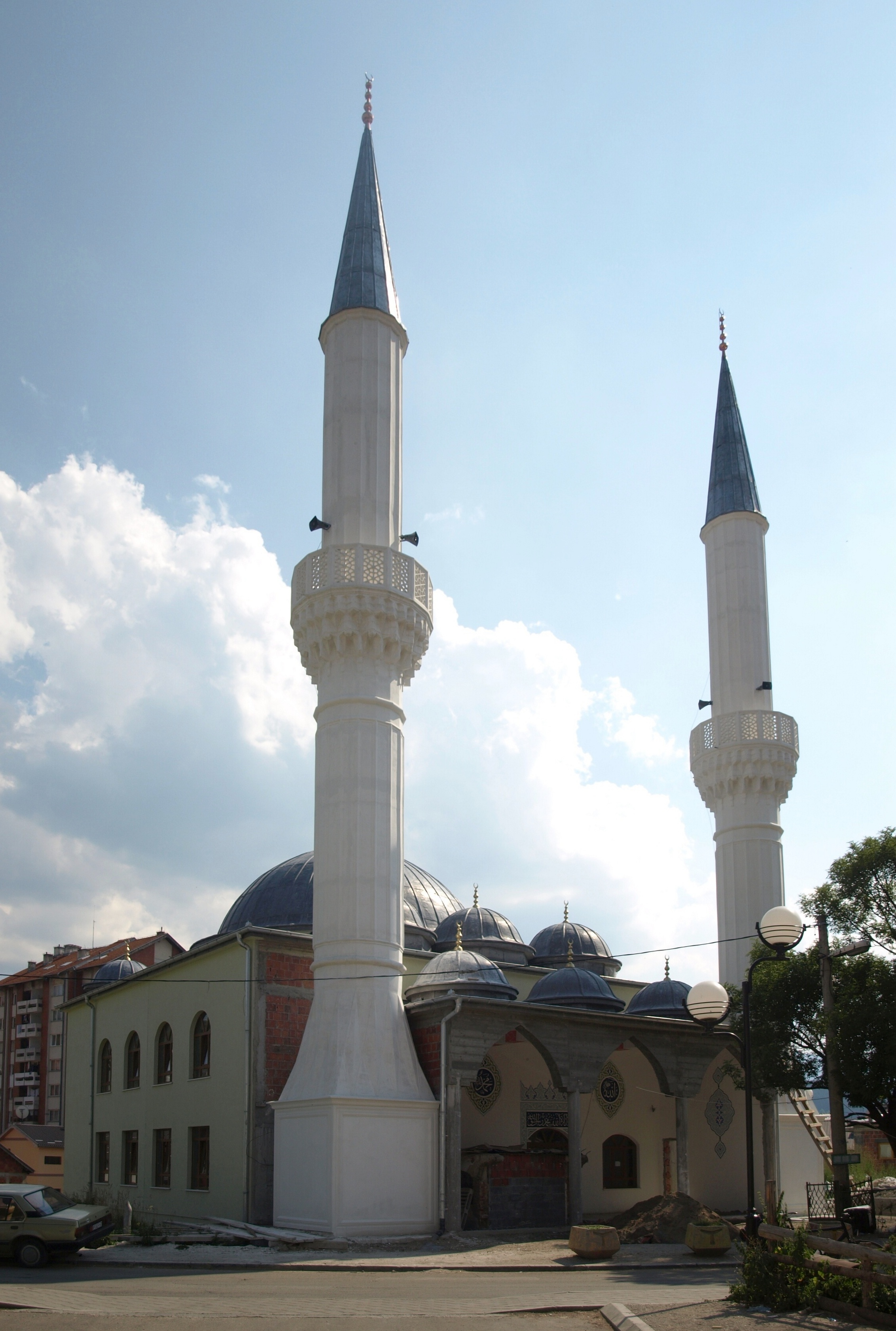
Sultan Murat II Mosque

Rožaje

== Notable people ==
- Ernad Sabotic (born 1979) - footballer

== Sources ==
=== Bibliography ===
- Morrison, Kenneth (2018). Nationalism, Identity and Statehood in Post-Yugoslav Montenegro. Bloomsbury Publishing. ISBN 9781474235204.
