= Rožaje Municipality =

Municipality of Montenegro

Rožaje Municipality Opština Rožaje Општина Рожаје Komuna e Rozhajës
- Municipality
- Flag Coat of arms

- Rožaje Municipality in Montenegro
- Coordinates: 42.8333°N 20.1667°E
- Country: Montenegro
- Seat: Rožaje

Area
  - Total: 432 km^{2} (167 sq mi)

Population (2023 Census)
  - Total: 23,184
  - Density: 53.7/km^{2} (139/sq mi)
- Postal code: 84310
- Area code: +382 51
- ISO 3166 code: ME-17
- Vehicle registration: RO
- Website: www.rozaje.me

Rožaje Municipality (Montenegrin and Bosnian: Opština Rožaje / Општина Рожаје; Albanian: Komuna e Rozhajës) is one of the municipalities of Montenegro. The main centre and capital of the Rožaje municipality is Rožaje. It covers an area of 432 km^{2}, and has a population of 23,184 inhabitants in the 2011 Census. It is located in northern Montenegro.

== Geography and location ==
The Rožaje municipality is located in the mountainous, northeastern region of Montenegro, as it's spread on the banks of the Ibar river, and contains its source. The municipality is located at an altitude of 1000 meters. There are several mountains surrounding the municipality, which are named Beleg, Sijenova, Ahmica, Turjak, Vlahovi, Krsača, Žljeb, and above all of them rises the 2,403 m high Hajla. Rožaje is situated on the main road connecting Montenegro with Kosovo. It also has a link with Novi Pazar in Central Serbia. The IB-22 Highway (otherwise known as the Ibarska magistrala) is the main regional road that connects Montenegro with Serbia.

== Municipal parliament ==
The municipal parliament consists of 34 deputies elected directly for a four-year term.

Party / Coalition	Seats	Local government
Bosniak Party	22 / 34	Government
Democratic Party of Socialists of Montenegro	4 / 34	Opposition
Social Democrats of Montenegro	2 / 34	Opposition
Social Democratic Party of Montenegro	2 / 34	Opposition

== Demographics ==
The town of Rožaje is the administrative centre of the Rožaje municipality, which has a total of 22,964 residents, and the town itself has a population of 9,567 in 2011. Rožaje is also considered to be the centre of the Bosniak community of Montenegro. Bosniaks form the majority in both the town and the municipality. The population of Albanians in Rožaje is 1,158, forming 5% of the total population in 2011. Albeit small, there is a minority of Serbs, mostly located in the village of Bijela Crkva, as well as in the town.

Ethnic groups (2011):

- Bosniaks: 19,269 (83.91%)
- Albanians: 1,158 (5.04%)
- ethnic Muslims: 1,044 (4.55%)
- Serbs: 822 (3.58%)
- Montenegrins: 401 (1.75%)
- Other or undecided: 270 (1.18%)

Languages (2011):

- Bosnian: 16,631 (72.42%)
- Montenegrin: 3,967 (17.27%)
- Albanian: 1,055 (4.59%)
- Serbian: 1,026 (4.47%)
- Other or undecided: 285 (1.24%)

Religions (2011):

- Muslims: 21,805 (94.95%)
- Orthodoxy: 1,055 (4.60%)
- Other or undecided: 104 (0.45%)

== Gallery ==
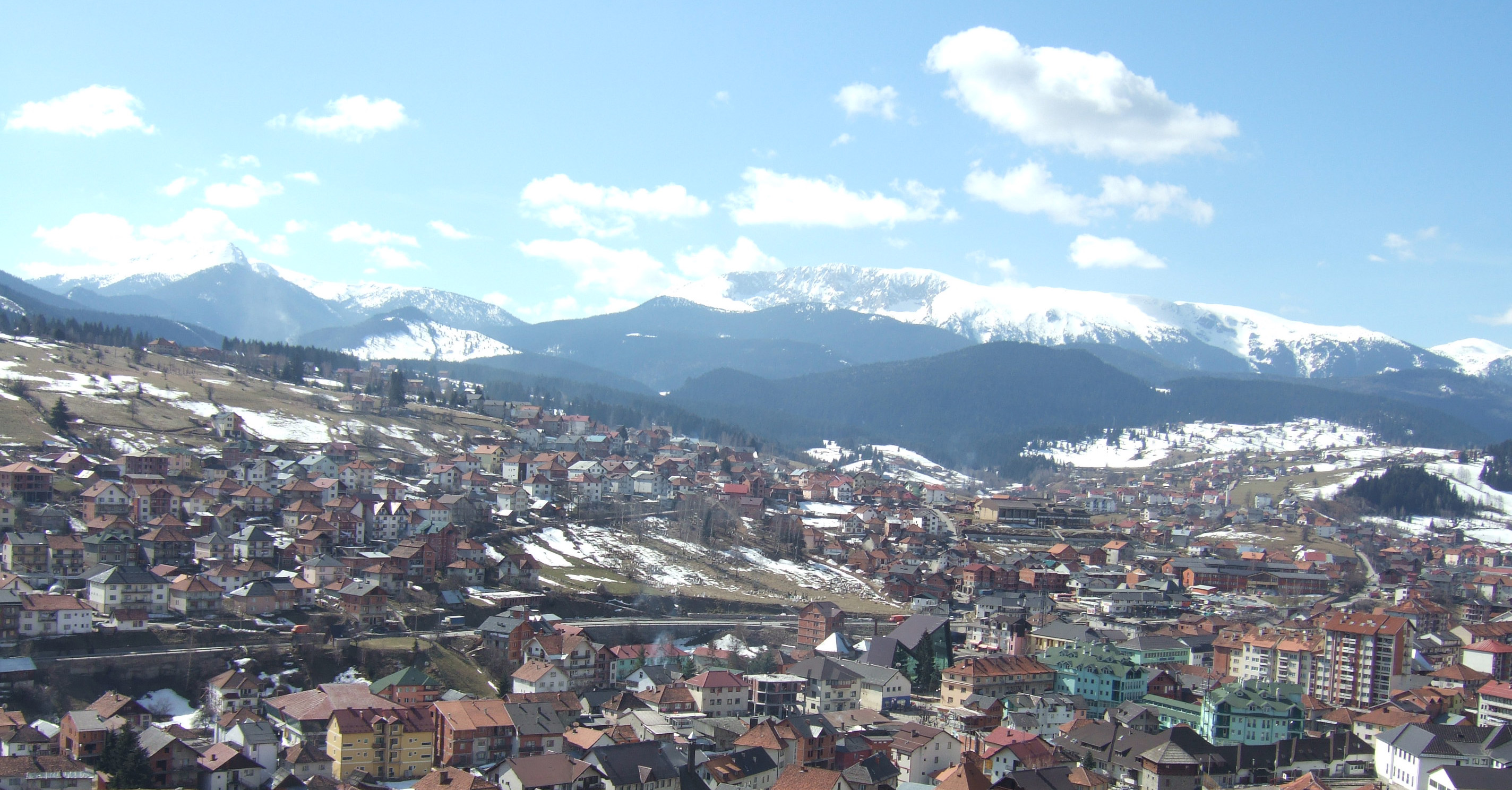
Town of Rožaje

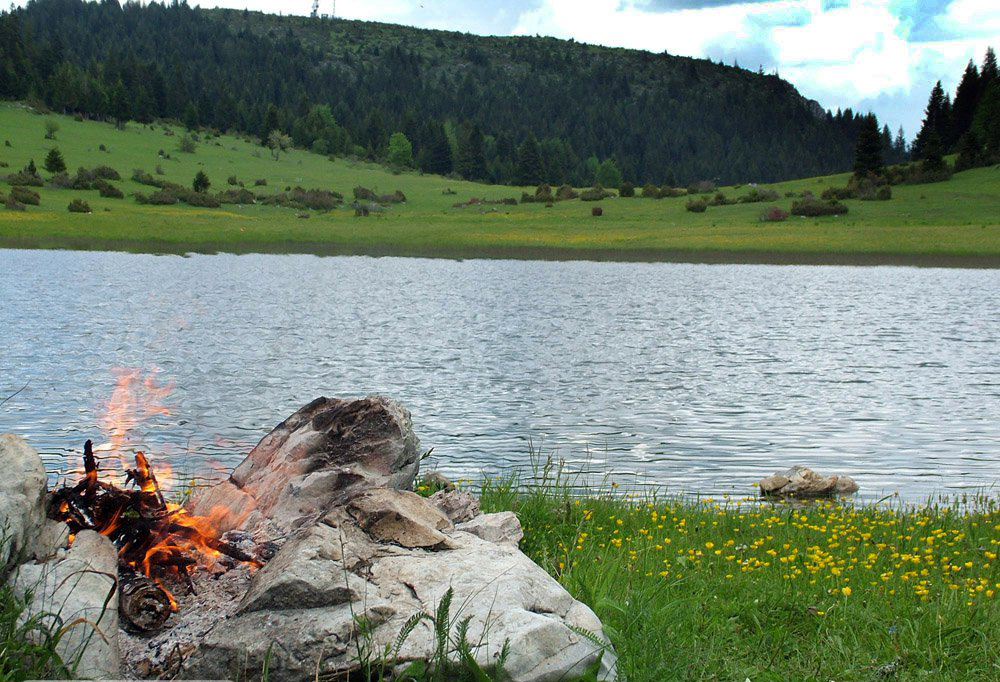
Lake Rujište

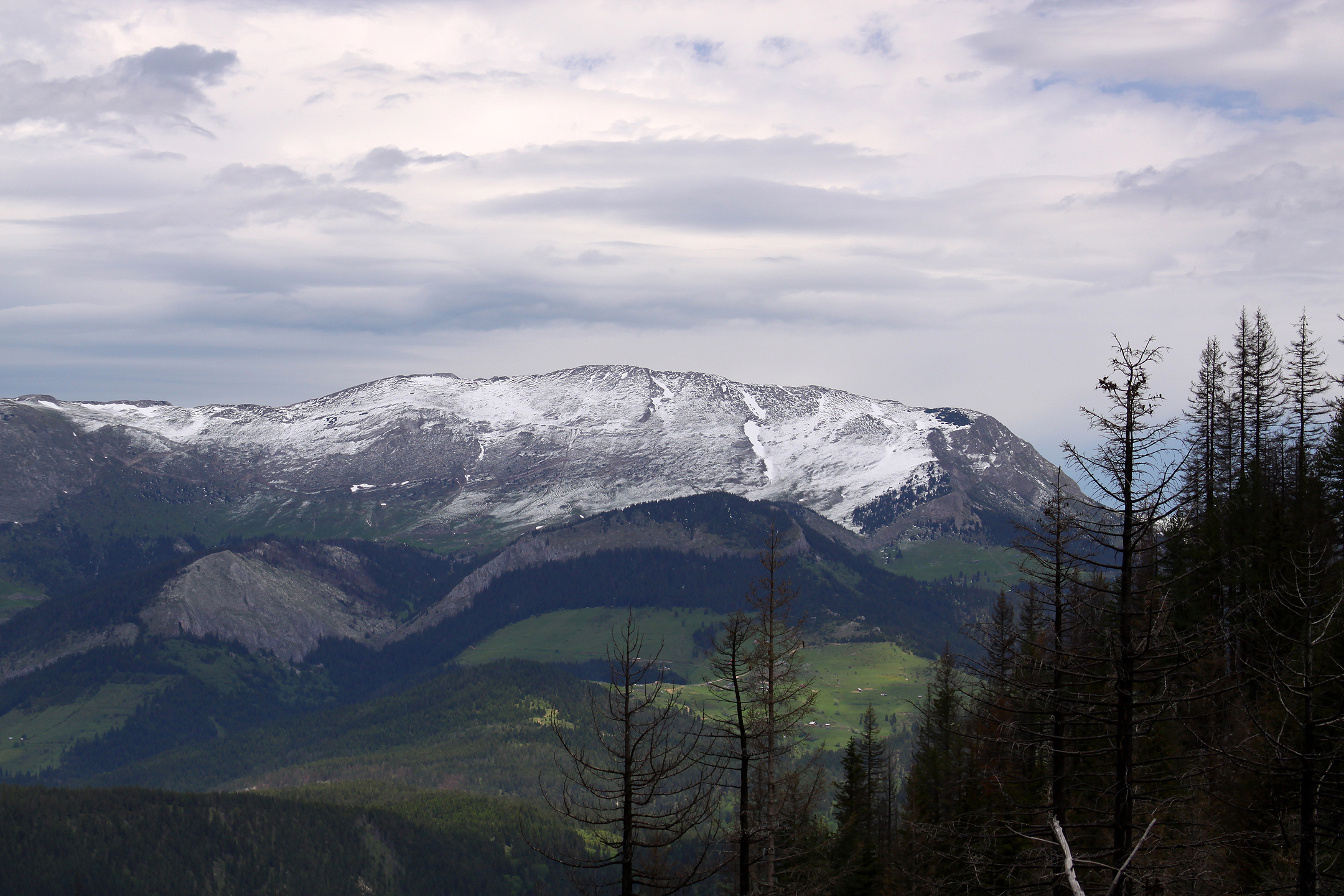
Hajla Mountain

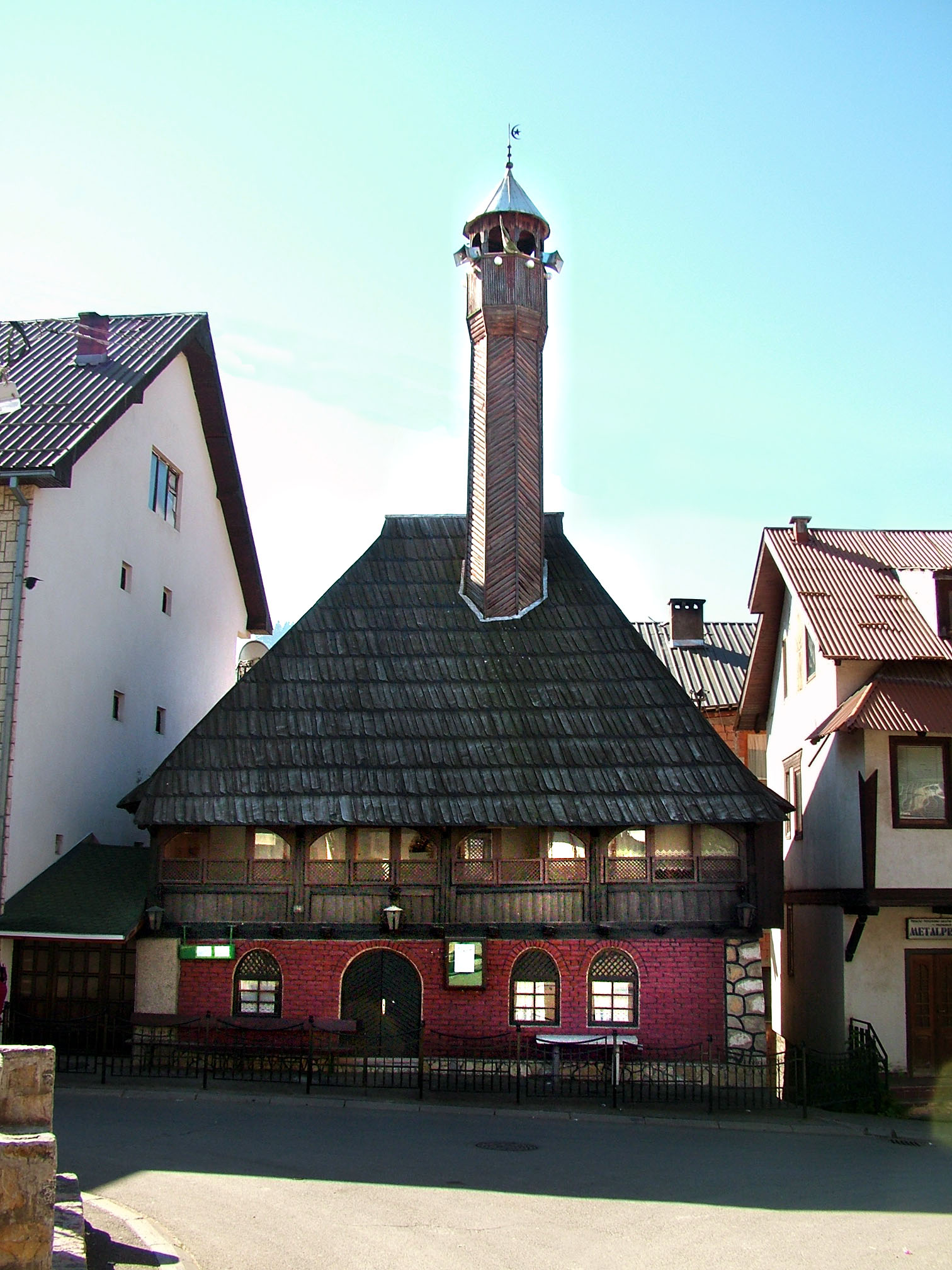
Kučanska Mosque
