= KK Crvena Zvezda all-time roster =

List of Crvena zvezda players

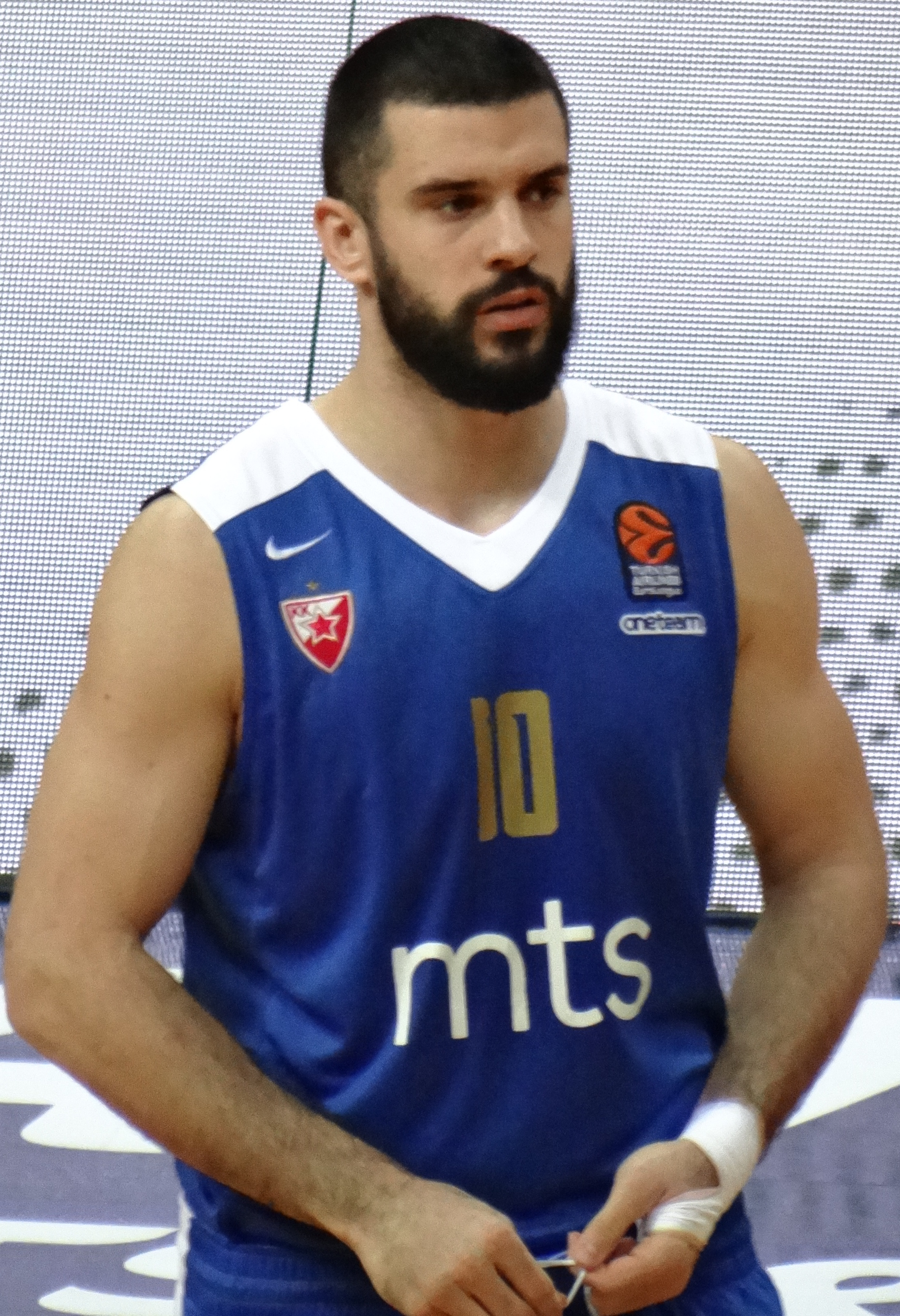
Forward Branko Lazić leads the club's all-time list for games played.

KK Crvena zvezda (transl. Red Star BC) is a men's professional basketball club based in Belgrade, Serbia. Crvena zvezda is a part of the Adriatic Basketball Association and competes domestically in the ABA League and the Serbian League. The Zvezda is regarded as one of the most successful clubs in Serbia history; their squads have won 21 National League championships, including in 10-in-a-row and current 6-in-a-row sequences. They have played in three different National Leagues since 1945, including the Yugoslav First Federal League (1945–1992), the First League of Serbia and Montenegro (1992–2006) and the Serbian League (2006 onward). They have also won ten National Cup titles, five Adriatic League Championships, one Adriatic Supercup, and one FIBA Saporta Cup (1974). The team play domestic home matches in the Aleksandar Nikolić Hall, and the EuroLeague or EuroCup home matches in Štark Arena.

Crvena zvezda is the only club in the world to have produced two members now in the Hall of Fame (Borislav Stanković and Aleksandar Nikolić) and four in the FIBA Hall of Fame (Stanković, Nebojša Popović, Radomir Šaper, and Nikolić). The four of them have the highest Order of Merit from FIBA. The Zvezda has selected eight former players as the Zvezdine zvezde (lit. transl. The Star's Stars, meaning The Stars of Red Star), including Aleksandar Gec, Popović, Nikolić, Stanković, Vladimir Cvetković, Zoran Slavnić, Zoran Radović, and Saša Obradović.

Seven father-and-son combinations were played for Crvena zvezda, including the Prelevićs (Miroslav and Branislav), the Cvetkovićs (Vladimir and Rastko), the Pavlovićs (Tihomir and Mirko), the Rakočevićs (Goran and Igor), the Koprivicas (Žarko and Jovan), the Tomovićs (Slobodan and Tomislav), and the Topićs (Milenko and Nikola). Two brothers duos played for the club, including the Dragićević twins (Tadija and Strahinja) and the Trifunovićs (Aleksandar and Časlav).

Popović, Gec, Milan Bjegojević, Đorđe Andrijašević, Nikolić, Nemanja Đurić, Strahinja Alagić, Dragiša Vučinić, Slavnić, Vladislav Lučić, Stevan Karadžić, Aleksandar Trifunović, Milenko Topić, and Obradović were the Zvezda's head coaches. Popović and Vučinić were player-coaches, also.

There are two players with the same first and last name, Nikola Jovanović, who played for Crvena zvezda. The older Nikola played for the club in the early 1990s, while the younger Nikola played in the late 2010s.

Greek center Sofoklis Schortsanitis, signed in August 2015, became the 400th registered player in club's history.

The list is composed of players who played at least one official game for Crvena zvezda.

== Key ==
#	Denotes current player
99	Clubs record
†	Elected into the Naismith Memorial Basketball Hall of Fame
*	Elected into the FIBA Hall of Fame
† *	Member of both the FIBA Hall of Fame and the Naismith Memorial Basketball Hall of Fame.

G	Guard	G/F	Guard-forward	F	Forward	F/C	Forward-center	C	Center

Note: Statistics are correct through the start of the 2022–23 season.

== A to B ==
Player	Pos.	Nationality	No.	Yrs	Seasons	GP	PS	Notes and accomplishments
Jaylen Adams	PG	United States	3	1	2022	5	35	None
Pavle Adler		Yugoslavia		3	1956, 1959–1960	28		None
Šemsudin Ahmetbašić		Yugoslavia		1	1979–1980	6		None
Strahinja Alagić		Yugoslavia		6	1947–1952	51		5× National League champion
Nemanja Aleksandrov	PF	Serbia	55	3	2006–2009			None
Aleksandar Aleksić		Yugoslavia	7	3	1983–1986			None
Dragan Aleksić	SG	Yugoslavia	5	1	1989–1990	10	0	None
Milutin Aleksić	SF	Serbia and Montenegro	8, 11	3	2000–2002	110	385	None
Stevan Aleksić		Yugoslavia		2	1950–1951	2	0	National League champion
Morris Almond	SG	United States	19	1	2012	5	20	None
Nemanja Andrejević	C	Serbia and Montenegro	12	1	2001–2002	3	9	None
Đorđe Andrijašević	G	Yugoslavia	6	6	1950–1956	110	685	6× National League champion
Pero Antić	C	North Macedonia (Note: Also holds Serbian citizenship.) (Note: Also holds Bulgarian citizenship.)	21, 12	3	2005–2007; 2017–2018	136	1,110	National League champion National Cup winner
Dragan Apić	F/C	Serbia	15	1	2017	5	18	None
Aleksandar Aranitović	SG	Serbia	7	1	2014–2015	2	1	National League champion
Nemanja Arnautović	SG	Serbia	10	1	2010	3	6	None
Neno Ašćerić	SF	Austria	5	1	2000	8		None
Zufer Avdija	PF	Yugoslavia (Note: Also holds Israeli citizenship.)	15	10	1979–1989	265	3,897	None
Tunji Awojobi	PF	Nigeria	21	1	2005	16	116	None
Maurice Bailey	PG	United States	4	1	2009	8	79	None
Boris Bakić	G	Montenegro	8, 33	4	2007–2011	168	1,170	None
Darko Balaban	C	Serbia	12	1	2010–2011	18	54	None
Stefan Balmazović	SG	Serbia	21	1	2007	1	0	None
Tihomir Balubdžić		Yugoslavia		1	1946	7	9	National League champion
Vladimir Banjac		Yugoslavia		1	1946	7	6	National League champion
Goran Banjanin	SF	Yugoslavia	11	2	1979–1981	50		None
Billy Baron	G	United States	12	2	2018–2020	109	1,307	Adriatic League champion National League champion Adriatic SuperCup winner
Emre Bayav	C	Turkey	12	1	2005	1	0	None
Miroslav Belić		Yugoslavia		5	1958–1962	73	187	None
Vojkan Benčić	G	Serbia and Montenegro	5	2	1986–1987, 1997–1998	65	348	National League champion
Ben Bentil #	PF	Ghana (Note: Also holds American citizenship.)	50	0	2022–present	0	0	None
Milan Bjegojević	G	Yugoslavia	5	9	1947–1955	105	827	9× National League champion
Milko Bjelica	F/C	Montenegro	7, 51	7	2001–2006; 2016–2018	300	2,041	Adriatic League champion National League champion 2× National Cup winner
Nemanja Bjelica	F	Serbia	44	2	2008–2010	102	850	None
Milan Blagojević		Yugoslavia		2	1947–1948	13	54	2× National League champion
Jaka Blažič	G/F	Slovenia	11	2	2013–2015	152	1,360	Adriatic League champion National League champion 2× National Cup winner
Luka Bogdanović	F	Serbia and Montenegro	15	2	2002–2004	69	539	National Cup winner
Predrag Bogosavljev	C	Yugoslavia	10	12	1976–1989	423	4,418	None
Života Bogosavljević	F	Yugoslavia	9, 14	1	1971–1972	20		National League champion
Zlatko Bolić	G	Serbia and Montenegro	10	5	1996–2000, 2002–2003	226	2,353	National League champion
Goran Bošković	G/F	Serbia and Montenegro	4	1	1999–2000	47	364	None
Saša Bratić	PF	Serbia and Montenegro	6	2	1999–2001	27	131	None
Derrick Brown	PF	United States	1	1	2019–2020	12	68	None
Elton Brown	C	United States	6	1	2012–2013	40	318	None
Lorenzo Brown	G	Spain (Note: In 2022, Brown granted Spanish citizenship and renounced American citizenship.)	4	1	2019–2020	49	552	None
M. Budimir		Yugoslavia		1	1967	7		None
Nebojša Bukumirović	PG	Yugoslavia	12	1	1990–1991	26	31	None
Osman Bukvić		Yugoslavia	9	1	1970–1971	24	33	National Cup winner
Antonio Burks	PG	United States	25	1	2006–2007	34	329	None

== C to D ==
Player	Pos.	Nationality	No.	Yrs	Seasons	GP	PS	Notes and accomplishments
Facundo Campazzo #	PG	Argentina	7	0	2022–present	0	0	None
Michael Campbell	SF	United States	20	1	2003	1	6	None
Quino Colom	PG	Spain (Note: Also holds Andorran citizenship.)	55	1	2020–2021	12	82	None
Omar Cook	PG	Montenegro	10	1	2007–2008	61	950	None
Vladimir Cvetić	G	Serbia and Montenegro	5, 10	1	2000–2001			None
Aleksandar Cvetković	G	Serbia	4	3	2010–2013	109	420	National Cup winner
Marko Cvetković	SG	Serbia	31	2	2007–2008	59	164	None
Rastko Cvetković	C	Serbia and Montenegro	8, 10	6	1988–1993; 1998–1999	217	1,525	National League champion
Vladimir Cvetković	F	Yugoslavia	8	13	1959–1972	289	5,983	2× National League champion National Cup winner
Miroljub Čavić		Yugoslavia		9	1954–1962	126	290	2× National League champion
Filip Čović	PG	Serbia	4, 3	4	2011–2012, 2018–2020	129	678	Adriatic League champion Adriatic SuperCup winner 2× National League champion
Nikola Čvorović	SF	Serbia	7, 5	2	2010–2011, 2014–2015	3	0	Adriatic League champion National Cup winner
Goran Ćakić	PF	Serbia and Montenegro	11	1	2002–2003			None
Borislav Ćurčić		Yugoslavia	14	6	1950–1955	97		6× National League champion
Milan Ćurčić	SF	Serbia and Montenegro		1	1993–1994			National League champion
Srđan Dabić	G	Yugoslavia	4	7	1978–1981; 1987–1991	224	1,649	None
Dražen Dalipagić † *	SF	Yugoslavia	15	1	1990–1991			None
Nemanja Dangubić	F	Serbia	6	4	2014–2018	236	1,467	3× Adriatic League champion 4× National League champion 2× National Cup winner
Dejan Davidovac	G	Serbia	7	5	2017–2022	301	2,095	3× Adriatic League champion 4× National League champion Adriatic SuperCup winner 2× National Cup winner
Ladislav Demšar	C	Yugoslavia	7	12	1948–1960	160	1,327	7× National League champion
Ivan Dimić	G	Yugoslavia		1	1946	7	6	National League champion
Hristofer Dimitrijević		Yugoslavia		2	1947, 1948	6	9	2× National League champion
Dimitrijević		Yugoslavia		1	1955	4		None
Vlade Divac † *	C	Serbia and Montenegro	12	1	1999	2	28	None
Ognjen Dobrić #	G	Serbia	13	6	2016–present	368	2,977	4× Adriatic League champion 5× National League champion Adriatic SuperCup winner 3× National Cup winner
Dobričić		Yugoslavia		1	1957	4		None
Milan Dozet	SF	Serbia and Montenegro	6	3	2001–2004	124	1,060	National Cup winner
Dragan Dragićević		Yugoslavia		1	1977–1978	12		None
Strahinja Dragićević	PF	Serbia	19, 10	2	2009–2011	16	86	None
Tadija Dragićević	PF	Serbia	20, 34	6	2004–2005; 2006–2010, 2014	235	2,581	National Cup winner
Sreten Dragojlović	SF	Yugoslavia	12	10	1957–1967	155	2,437	2× National Cup winner
Vladislav Dragojlović	C	Serbia and Montenegro	14	3	2003–2006	150	1,300	None
Vitomir Dragović		Yugoslavia		1	1981–1982	5		None
Luka Drča	G	Serbia	5	1	2010–2011	30	110	None
Dronjak		Yugoslavia		2	1959–1960	17		None
Veso Đonlez		Yugoslavia	15	1	1978–1979	19		None
Igor Đaletić	F/C	Serbia and Montenegro	13	1	2002	15	57	None
Milorad Đerić		Yugoslavia		1	1954	11		National League champion
Dejan Đokić	PG	Serbia	4	1	2013	6	1	None
Vladimir Đokić	PG	Serbia and Montenegro	4, 10	1	2000–2001			None
Aleksandar Đurić	C	Austria	12	1	2003–2004	53	427	National Cup winner
Nemanja Đurić	F/C	Yugoslavia		3	1955, 1968–1970			National League champion
Žarko Đurišić	C	Yugoslavia (Note: Also holds Slovenian citizenship.)	12	2	1978–1980	46		None

== E to J ==
Player	Pos.	Nationality	No.	Yrs	Seasons	GP	PS	Notes and accomplishments
Obinna Ekezie	C	Nigeria	12	1	2002–2003	25	357	None
Dylan Ennis	PG	Canada (Note: Also holds Jamaican citizenship.)	31	1	2017–2018	39	266	None
Mouhammad Faye	PF	Senegal	11	2	2018–2020	80	524	Adriatic League champion National League champion Adriatic SuperCup winner
James Feldeine	SG	Dominican Republic	14	1	2017–2018	73	940	National League champion
Daymeon Fishback	SF	United States	5	1	2000–2001	14	13	None
Reggie Freeman	G/F	U.S. Virgin Islands	7	1	2003	4	30	None
Vladimir Gaćinović		Yugoslavia		3	1947–1949	10	0	3× National League champion
Aleksandar Gajić	PG	Serbia and Montenegro	23	1	2002–2003			None
Ganović		Yugoslavia		1	1965	3		None
Gavrić		Yugoslavia		1	1954	5		None
Aleksandar Gec	G	Yugoslavia	10	8	1946–1953	98	647	8× National League champion
Aleksandar Gilić	C	Serbia and Montenegro (Note: Also holds Bosnian-Herzegovinian citizenship.)	9	5	1988–1990; 1993–1996	113	1,163	National League champion
James Gist	PF	United States	15	1	2019–2020	46	406	None
R. Gligović		Yugoslavia	8	2	1975–1976, 1977–1978	48		None
Dragan Godžić		Yugoslavia		7	1946–1948, 1951–1955	72		7× National League champion
Zefirino Grasi	C	Yugoslavia	14	2	1971–1973	41		National Cup winner
Zoran Grubović		Yugoslavia	8	1	1972–1973	16		National Cup winner
Vladan Grujičić		Yugoslavia	5	4	1974–1978	115	349	National Cup winner
Pavel Gromyko	SF	Russia	4	1	2007–2008	5	13	None
Marko Gudurić	G/F	Serbia	23	2	2015–2017	146	1,146	2× Adriatic League champion 2× National League champion National Cup winner
Milan Gurović	G/F	Serbia	15	2	2005–2007	107	2,296	National Cup winner
Marko Gušić	SG	Serbia	1	1	2021	3	2	None
Langston Hall	G	United States	1	1	2020–2021	57	323	Adriatic League champion National League champion
Simeon Haley	F/C	United States	15	1	1997	2	4	None
Gerrod Henderson	SG	United States	23	2	2004–2005, 2006	99	1,088	National Cup winner
John Holland #	G/F	Puerto Rico	0	0	2022–present	0	0	None
Austin Hollins	SG	United States	14	1	2021–2022	65	577	Adriatic League champion National League champion National Cup winner
Dalibor Ilić #	F	Serbia	22	0	2022–present	0	0	None
Dragoslav Ilić		Yugoslavia		2	1967–1969	13		National League champion
Mile Ilić	C	Serbia	9	1	2011–2012	43	294	None
Nebojša Ilić	G	Serbia and Montenegro	5	10	1985–1993; 1995–1997	304	4,779	National League champion
Vanja Ivanišević	PG	Bosnia and Herzegovina	18	1	2005	1	5	None
Nikola Ivanović #	PG	Montenegro	20	1	2021–present	66	659	Adriatic League champion National League champion National Cup winner
Ivanović		Yugoslavia		1	1956	1		None
Marko Jagodić-Kuridža	PF	Serbia (Note: Also holds Croatian citizenship.)	21	2	2019–2021	79	416	Adriatic League champion National League champion National Cup winner
Jakšić		Yugoslavia		1	1954	6		None
Boban Janković	SF	Yugoslavia	8	10	1980–1990; 1991–1992	329	3,517	None
Stefan Janković	F/C	Serbia (Note: Also holds Canadian citizenship.)	16	1	2017–2018	68	367	National League champion
Ljubiša Janjić		Yugoslavia		1	1965	4		None
Nemanja Jelesijević	PF	Serbia and Montenegro	5	1	2004–2005			None
Dušan Jelić	C	Serbia and Montenegro (Note: Also holds Greek citizenship.)	6	2	1991–1992, 2000–2001			None
Stevan Jelovac	PF	Serbia	19, 13	2	2010	12	54	None
Charles Jenkins	G	United States	22	4	2013–2015; 2016–2017; 2019–2020	278	2,498	2× Adriatic League champion 2× National League champion 3× National Cup winner
Goran Jeretin	PG	Serbia and Montenegro	4	4	2002–2006	184	1,959	2× National Cup winner
Jerosimić		Yugoslavia		3	1964–1966	30		None
Nikola Jestratijević	C	Serbia and Montenegro	9, 10, 12	5	1994–1996; 1998–2000; 2004	174	1,251	None
Nikola Jokanović	G	Yugoslavia	7	5	1980–1985	152	382	None
Mirko Joksimović	C	Yugoslavia		1	1990–1991			None
Borko Jovanović		Yugoslavia	13	10	1949–1958	127	757	7× National League champion
Nikola Jovanović (b. 1969)	F/C	Serbia and Montenegro	15	2	1992–1994			2× National League champion
Nikola Jovanović (b. 1994)	F/C	Serbia	32	2	2017–2018, 2019–2020	59	248	National League champion
Rade Jovanović		Yugoslavia		3	1946–1948	10	13	3× National League champion
Srđan Jovanović	G	Serbia and Montenegro	4	2	1992–1993, 2001–2002			National League champion
Zoran Jovanović	C	Serbia and Montenegro	9	6	1987–1993	223	2,207	National League champion
Dragoje Jovašević		Yugoslavia	9, 14	6	1973–1979	136	488	FIBA European Cup Winners' Cup champion National Cup winner
Stefan Jović	PG	Serbia	24	3	2014–2017	193	1,207	3× Adriatic League champion 3× National League champion 2× National Cup winner
Jovović		Yugoslavia		1	1977–1978	1		None

== K to L ==
Player	Pos.	Nationality	No.	Yrs	Seasons	GP	PS	Notes and accomplishments
Srđan Kalember	SF	Yugoslavia	12	9	1946–1954	109	824	9× National League champion
Slobodan Kaličanin	PF	Serbia and Montenegro	8, 11, 12	5	1988–1990; 1991–1994	133	342	2× National League champion
Nikola Kalinić	F	Serbia	12	2	2014–2015, 2021–2022	148	1615	2× Adriatic League champion 2× National League champion 2× National Cup winner
Dragan Kapičić	SF	Yugoslavia	10	12	1965–1977	339	6,197	FIBA European Cup Winners' Cup champion 2× National League champion 3× National Cup winner
Dubravko Kapetanović		Yugoslavia		3	1968–1971	46		National League champion
Đorđe Kaplanović	F/C	Serbia (Note: Also holds Montenegrin citizenship.)	14	1	2014–2015	7	11	Adriatic League champion National League champion National Cup winner
Karađozović		Yugoslavia		2	1956–1957	10		None
Goran Karadžić	G/F	Serbia and Montenegro	7, 13, 15	4	1993–1997	150	920	National League champion
N. Karadžić		Yugoslavia		2	1975–1977	38		None
Stevan Karadžić	G	Yugoslavia	9, 12	9	1980–1989	299	3,511	None
Katanić		Yugoslavia		1	1963	2		None
Ljubomir Katić	F/C	Yugoslavia		1	1958	11		None
Raško Katić	C	Serbia	15	3	2004–2005; 2012–2014	150	1,414	2× National Cup winner
Dušan Katnić	PG	Serbia	14	2	2010	11	59	None
Marko Kešelj	SF	Serbia	4	4	2008–2010; 2017–2019	149	1,070	Adriatic League champion 2× National League champion Adriatic SuperCup winner
Elmedin Kikanović	C	Bosnia and Herzegovina	9	3	2007–2010	173	1,568	None
Tarence Kinsey	G/F	United States	1	1	2016	41	383	Adriatic League champion National League champion
Bogdan Kolaković	C	Yugoslavia		7	1956–1962	83	837	None
Branislav Kontić		Yugoslavia	14	10	1956–1965	123	693	None
Đorđe Konjović	C	Yugoslavia		5	1953–1957	49		3× National League champion
Jovan Koprivica	F	Serbia and Montenegro	7	4	2001–2005	117	764	None
Žarko Koprivica	C	Yugoslavia	7	7	1974–1981	185	2,718	National Cup winner
Mirko Kovač	SF	Serbia	11	3	2006–2009	128	767	None
Branko Kovačević	G/F	Yugoslavia	12	5	1979–1984	180	2,009	None
Dejan Kovačević	PG	Serbia	1	10	2007	3	9	None
Siniša Kovačević	SF	Bosnia and Herzegovina	13, 15	1	1996–1997			None
Sava Kovačević		Yugoslavia		1	1979–1980	22		None
Igor Krasnić	PG	Serbia	6	2	2006–2008			None
Vojkan Krgović	C	Serbia and Montenegro		1	1995–1996			None
Dimitrije Krstić		Yugoslavia		2	1950–1951	7		2× National League champion
Risto Kubura	C	Yugoslavia	5, 9	1	1971–1972	8		National League champion
Vladimir Kuzmanović	SG	Serbia and Montenegro (Note: Also holds Macedonian citizenship.)	12	1	1997–1998			National League champion
Ognjen Kuzmić #	C	Serbia	0, 32	4	2016–2017, 2019–2020, 2020–present	260	2,351	3× Adriatic League champion 3× National League champion 3× National Cup winner
Zoran Latifić	F	Yugoslavia	13	2	1971–1974	73		FIBA European Cup Winners' Cup champion National League champion National Cup winner
Stefan Lazarević #	G/F	Serbia	7, 11	3	2014, 2017, 2021–present	69	217	Adriatic League champion National League champion National Cup winner
Zoran Lazarević		Yugoslavia	5	7	1968–1975	212	782	FIBA European Cup Winners' Cup champion 2× National League champion 3× National Cup winner
Aleksandar Lazić	G	Yugoslavia	4	2	1991–1993			National League champion
Branko Lazić #	G/F	Serbia	10	11	2011–present	697	3,115	6× Adriatic League champion 7× National League champion Adriatic SuperCup winner 6× National Cup winner
Đorđe Lazić		Yugoslavia		2	1947–1948	7	0	2× National League champion
Marko Lekić	C	Serbia	21	1	2008	35	137	None
Nikola Lepojević	G	Serbia and Montenegro	15	2	2004–2005	57	351	None
Mathias Lessort	C	France	26	1	2017–2018	77	593	National League champion
Sava Lešić	PF	Serbia	15	2	2010–2012	71	612	None
Mileta Lisica	F/C	Serbia and Montenegro	7	3	1992–1994; 1995–1996	103	1,345	2× National League champion
Horacio Llamas	C	Mexico		1	2002			None
Jordan Loyd	SG	United States	3	1	2020–2021	64	1,037	Adriatic League champion National League champion National Cup winner
Kalin Lucas	PG	United States	16	1	2020	5	8	None
Vladislav Lučić		Yugoslavia		5	1960–1965	69	114	None
Lukačević		Yugoslavia		1	1964	1		None
Dragan Lukovski	PG	Serbia and Montenegro	15	1	1999–2000			None
Oleksandr Lypovyy	G/F	Ukraine	31	1	2014	22	85	None

== M ==
Player	Pos.	Nationality	No.	Yrs	Seasons	GP	PS	Notes and accomplishments
Dušan Macura	C	Serbia and Montenegro	9	2	1996–1998			National League champion
M Maksimović		Yugoslavia	14	2	1976–1978	40		None
Vukašin Mandić	F	Serbia and Montenegro		1	2005			None
Marić		Yugoslavia		4	1961–1964	35		None
Ivan Marinković	PF	Serbia	20	1	2010–2011	9	16	None
Mića Marinković		Yugoslavia		1	1949	16	14	National League champion
Milan Marinković	SF	Bosnia and Herzegovina	13	2	1991–1993			National League champion
Marinković		Yugoslavia		1	1979–1980	1		None
Marko Marinović	PG	Serbia	14	1	2008–2009	44	464	None
Boban Marjanović	C	Serbia	13	2	2013–2015	149	1,766	Adriatic League champion National League champion 2× National Cup winner
Nikola Marković	F/C	Serbia	7	1	2011–2012	14	65	None
Stefan Marković #	G	Serbia	27	1	2021–present	53	205	Adriatic League champion National League champion National Cup winner
Steven Marković	G	Australia	27, 7, 10	4	2005–2008; 2009	145	692	None
Zoran Marković		Yugoslavia		3	1964–1966	38		None
Radivoj Marojević	SF	Yugoslavia	7	1	1991–1992			None
Ricardo Marsh	PF	United States	21	1	2010–2011	20	384	None
Hassan Martin #	C	United States	12	0	2022–present	0	0	None
Milivoje Matić	G	Yugoslavia	10	11	1956–1966	164	948	None
Matković		Yugoslavia		1	1963	7		None
Ivica Mavrenski	PG	Serbia and Montenegro	5	2	1993–1995	81	752	National League champion
Gal Mekel	G	Israel	7	1	2015	13	115	None
Relja Meštrović		Yugoslavia		1	1946	7	10	National League champion
Vasilije Micić	PG	Serbia	13	1	2015–2016	45	236	Adriatic League champion National League champion
Nebojša Mihailović		Yugoslavia		1	1979–1980	8		None
Mikoš Milekić		Yugoslavia		2	1980–1981, 1982–1983	30		None
Danijel Milić		Serbia and Montenegro	7	1	1997			None
Mirko Milićević	C	Yugoslavia (Note: Also holds Turkish citizenship.)	13	6	1982–1988	170	1,808	None
Milinković		Yugoslavia		1	1960	3		None
Aleksandar Milivojša	C	Yugoslavia	7, 14	4	1981–1986	126	386	None
Quincy Miller	F	United States	30	1	2015–2016	62	755	Adriatic League champion National League champion
Radivoje Milosavljević	F	Yugoslavia	4					None
Dušan Milošević	SG	Serbia	7	1	2010	8	10	None
Igor Milošević	G	Greece	5	3	2005–2008			National Cup winner
Milan Milošević	F	Bosnia and Herzegovina	7, 21	1	2008–2009	38	134	None
Stevan Milošević	C	Montenegro	10	1	2008	9	16	None
Strahinja Milošević	SF	Serbia	18	1	2010–2011	23	184	None
Jovan Milovanović		Yugoslavia		1	1974–1975	8		None
Milan Milovanović	C	Serbia	13	1	2012–2013	16	27	National Cup winner
Andreja Milutinović	G/F	Serbia	35	2	2011–2013	50	441	None
Rade Milutinović	G/F	Serbia and Montenegro	10	2	1993–1994, 2001			National League champion
Milutinović		Yugoslavia		6	1964–1970	84		None
Stefan Miljević	G	Serbia and Montenegro	16	2	2002–2003	2	0	None
Milutin Minja	G	Yugoslavia		4	1957–1960			None
Miloš Mirković	F/C	Bosnia and Herzegovina	9	2	2003–2004	49	260	National Cup winner
Uroš Mirković	PF	Serbia	9	1	2010	5	31	None
Nenad Mišanović	C	Serbia	13	3	2005–2008	141	738	National Cup winner
Radmilo Mišić		Yugoslavia		1	1953	9		None
Dejan Mišković	C	Serbia and Montenegro	14	3	1996–1998; 2000–2001	113	983	National League champion
Luka Mitrović #	PF	Serbia	9	6	2012–2017, 2021–present	329	2,291	4× Adriatic League champion 4× National League champion 5× National Cup winner
Miroljub Mitrović	G	Yugoslavia	15	1	1991–1992			None
Isaiah Morris	PF	United States	5	1	2001–2002	20	250	None
Adam Morrison	F	United States	33	1	2011	8	124	None
Branko Mrđen	F	Yugoslavia		3	1979–1982	51		None
Anthony Myles	F/C	United States	24	1	2010–2011	12	81	None

== N to Q ==
Player	Pos.	Nationality	No.	Yrs	Seasons	GP	PS	Notes and accomplishments
Stefan Nastić	C	Serbia	22	1	2015–2016	9	27	Adriatic League champion
Dušan Nedić	PF	Serbia and Montenegro	15	1	2001–2002	16	222	None
Nemanja Nedović #	G	Serbia	16, 26	4	2008–2012, 2022–present	131	922	None
DeMarcus Nelson	G	United States	20	2	2012–2014	130	1,360	2× National Cup winner
Nemanja Nenadić	G	Serbia	9	2	2018–2019	33	147	Adriatic League champion National League champion Adriatic SuperCup winner
Branko Nešić		Yugoslavia	11	6	1952–1957	53	116	4× National League champion
Aleksej Nešović	PG	Bosnia and Herzegovina	16	2	2002–2004			National Cup winner
Aleksandar Nikolić	SF	Yugoslavia	4	3	1947–1949	34	82	3× National League champion
Slobodan Nikolić	G	Yugoslavia	6	14	1975–1987; 1989–1991	429	5,469	None
Uroš Nikolić	F/C	Serbia	19	2	2010–2012	66	534	None
Nikolić		Yugoslavia		4	1958–1961	34		None
Dayon Ninkovic	F/C	United States	15	1	1998			None
Zoran Nišavić	G	Serbia and Montenegro	10	1	2001–2002	21	109	None
Landry Nnoko	C	Cameroon	35	1	2020–2021	37	368	Adriatic League champion National League champion
Novaković		Yugoslavia		1	1960	10		None
Č. Novčić	F/C	Yugoslavia	5, 13	2	1977–1979	24		None
Larry O'Bannon	G	United States	34	1	2005–2006	59	550	National Cup winner
Johnny O'Bryant	F/C	United States	00	1	2020–2021	23	309	National Cup winner
Saša Obradović	G	Serbia and Montenegro	6	9	1987–1993; 1993–1994; 1999–2000	198	1,994	2× National League champion
Michael Ojo	C	Nigeria	50	2	2018–2020	103	716	Adriatic League champion National League champion Adriatic SuperCup winner
Miomir Ognjenović		Yugoslavia	5	2	1989–1991			None
Alen Omić	C	Slovenia	23	1	2018	42	442	National League champion
Marko Ostarčević		Yugoslavia (Note: Also holds French citizenship.)		2	1961–1962	19		None
Radivoje Ostojić		Yugoslavia		3	1954–1956	27		2× National League champion
Đorđe Otašević		Yugoslavia		1	1954	8		National League champion
Andre Owens	SG	United States	23	1	2008–2009	52	575	None
Vesko Pajović		Yugoslavia	9	3	1972–1975	84		FIBA European Cup Winners' Cup champion 2× National Cup winner
Vojislav Pavasović		Yugoslavia		3	1953–1955	33		3× National League champion
Luka Pavićević	PG	Serbia and Montenegro	6, 5	3	1995–1996, 1998–1999, 2002–2003			None
Mirko Pavlović	F	Serbia and Montenegro	11, 14	4	1989–1990; 1994–1997	162	886	None
Tihomir Pavlović		Yugoslavia	14	9	1963–1972	185	1,341	2× National League champion
Kiril Pavlovski	C	North Macedonia	5	1	2003–2004			None
Stevan Peković	SF	Serbia and Montenegro	7, 10	2	1998–1999, 2001–2002			None
Scoonie Penn	PG	United States	5, 9, 15, 16, 20	1	2002–2003	52	783	None
Igor Perović	SG	Serbia and Montenegro	4	2	1996–1998			National League champion
Stratos Perperoglou	SF	Greece	5	2	2018–2020	67	657	Adriatic League champion National League champion Adriatic SuperCup winner
Božidar Pešić		Yugoslavia	4, 7	5	1970–1975	102	185	FIBA European Cup Winners' Cup champion National League champion 3× National Cup winner
Branko Petković		Serbia and Montenegro		1	1994–1995			None
Ivo Petović	F/C	Yugoslavia	12	8	1983–1990	200	1,192	None
Nemanja Petrović	C	Yugoslavia	8	1	1990–1991			None
Petar Petrović		Serbia and Montenegro		1	1993–1994			National League champion
Petar Petrović (b. 1976)	SF	Serbia and Montenegro		1	2001–2002	12		None
Petrović		Yugoslavia		4	1962–1965	19		None
Filip Petrušev #	F/C	Serbia	33	0	2022–present	0	0	None
Miroslav Poljak		Yugoslavia	7	7	1961–1971	104	271	National League champion National Cup winner
Marko Popadić	PG	Serbia (Note: Also holds Hungarian citizenship.)	6, 7	1	2006–2007	2	0	None
Bojan Popović	PG	Serbia	40	1	2011–2012	48	365	None
Nebojša Popović *		Yugoslavia	8	6	1945–1951	58	518	6× National League champion
Nemanja Popović	PF	Serbia	77	1	2021	1	3	None
Obren Popović		Yugoslavia	8	11	1951–1961	136	1,131	3× National League champion
Oliver Popović	SF	Serbia and Montenegro	13	2	1997–1999	91	794	National League champion
Petar Popović	C	Serbia	11, 55	3	2000–2001; 2006–2007; 2011–2012	145	1,197	None
Slobodan Popović	SF	Yugoslavia		6	1963–1968	86		National League champion
D. Popović		Yugoslavia		3	1965–1967			None
Milan Preković	G/F	Serbia and Montenegro	15	1	2000–2001			None
Branislav Prelević	SG	Yugoslavia		4	1984–1988			None
Prelević		Yugoslavia		6	1957–1962	88		None
Đorđe Prstojević	PG	Serbia and Montenegro	11	1	2001–2002	3	8	None
Kevin Punter	SG	United States	00	1	2019–2020	23	335	None

== R ==
Player	Pos.	Nationality	No.	Yrs	Seasons	GP	PS	Notes and accomplishments
Račić		Yugoslavia		2	1967–1968	10		None
Aleksa Radanov	SG	Serbia	20, 2, 11, 12	5	2015, 2018–2019, 2020–2021	78	274	3× Adriatic League champion 3× National League champion Adriatic SuperCup winner National Cup winner
Ivan Radenović	F/C	Serbia	14	1	2013–2014	57	337	National Cup winner
Bojan Radetić	PF	Serbia	22	1	2011–2012	4	32	None
Nikola Radičević	PG	Serbia	5	1	2017–2018	18	72	None
Milan Radivojević		Yugoslavia		2	1953–1954	20		2× National League champion
Vuk Radivojević	G	Serbia	5, 18	7	2003–2007; 2009–2010; 2011–2013	354	2,390	3× National Cup winner
Vladimir Radmanović	F	Serbia and Montenegro	7, 11	4	1997–2001	101	724	National League champion
Lazar Radosavljević	F	Serbia	11, 23	2	2009–2011	47	134	None
Branko Radović		Yugoslavia		2	1958–1959	19		None
Velibor Radović	F	Serbia and Montenegro	8, 13	2	1995–1996, 2002–2003			None
Zoran Radović	G	Yugoslavia	11	9	1981–1990	270	3,804	None
Rastko Radulović		Yugoslavia		1	1953	9		National League champion
M. Radulović		Yugoslavia	13	1	1978–1979	19		None
Miroslav Raduljica #	C	Serbia	15	0	2022–present	0	0	None
Joe Ragland	PG	United States (Note: Also holds Liberian citizenship.)	1	1	2018–2019	44	541	Adriatic League champion Adriatic SuperCup winner
Miroslav Raičević	F/C	Serbia	16, 23, 31	2	2005–2006; 2007–2008	102	923	National Cup winner
Petar Rakićević	SF	Serbia	20	1	2016–2017	18	34	Adriatic League champion National League champion National Cup winner
Goran Rakočević	G	Yugoslavia	14, 4	10	1969–1979	271	1,749	FIBA European Cup Winners' Cup champion National League champion 3× National Cup winner
Igor Rakočević	G	Serbia	6, 7, 8, 11, 13	8	1994–2000; 2003–2004; 2012–2013	324	4,007	National League champion 2× National Cup winner
Duop Reath	F/C	Australia (Note: Also holds South Sudanese citizenship.)	11	1	2020–2021	52	249	Adriatic League champion National League champion
Nikola Rebić	G	Serbia	4	4	2013–2016	108	331	2× Adriatic League champion 2× National League champion 2× National Cup winner
Norman Richardson	SG	United States	10	1	2003–2004			National Cup winner
Dušan Ristić	C	Serbia	16, 14	2	2013, 2018–2019	59	279	Adriatic League champion National League champion Adriatic SuperCup winner
K. C. Rivers	G/F	United States	23	1	2019	25	276	Adriatic League champion National League champion
Lawrence Roberts	PF	United States	5	1	2008–2009	23	208	None
Taylor Rochestie	G	Montenegro	22, 0	2	2017–2018, 2020	93	1,419	National League champion
Tullio Rochlitzer	G	Yugoslavia (Note: Also holds Italian citizenship.)	3	4	1949–1952	39		3× National League champion
Mića Rodić		Yugoslavia		1	1977–1978	10		None
Nikola Rondović	SF	Serbia	25, 13, 21	2	2007, 2009–2010	9	8	None

== S ==
Player	Pos.	Nationality	No.	Yrs	Seasons	GP	PS	Notes and accomplishments
Ivan Saičić	SF	Serbia	7	1	2011	2	7	None
Ivan Salaj	F	Yugoslavia	12	5	1978–1983	119	285	None
Predrag Samardžiski	C	North Macedonia	17	1	2013	14	66	National Cup winner
Ivan Sarjanović	F	Yugoslavia	6	10	1967–1976	270	1,001	FIBA European Cup Winners' Cup champion 2× National League champion 3× National Cup winner
Goran Savanović	G	Serbia and Montenegro	4	1	2000–2001			None
Boris Savović	F/C	Serbia	14, 33	1	2012–2013	62	655	National Cup winner
Zlatko Savović	PG	Bosnia and Herzegovina	10	1	2004	14	23	None
Blake Schilb	SF	Czech Republic	33	1	2013–2014	27	273	None
Sofoklis Schortsanitis	C	Greece (Note: Also holds Cameroonian citizenship.)	21	1	2015	8	38	None
Michael Scott	SF	United States	21	1	2012–2013	53	317	National Cup winner
Boriša Simanić	PF	Serbia	12, 22, 28	5	2015–2017; 2018–2021	153	695	3× Adriatic League champion 3× National League champion 2× National Cup winner Adriatic SuperCup winner
Simić		Yugoslavia		1	1990–1991			None
Ljubodrag Simonović	G	Yugoslavia	11	10	1967–1976	263	4,461	FIBA European Cup Winners' Cup champion 2× National League champion 3× National Cup winner
Marko Simonović	F	Serbia	12, 19	6	2012–2014; 2015–2017; 2020–2022	388	2,681	4× Adriatic League champion 4× National League champion 5× National Cup winner
Zoran Slavnić *	G	Yugoslavia	15	11	1967–1977	304	4,067	FIBA European Cup Winners' Cup champion 2× National League champion 3× National Cup winner
Ivan Smiljanić	F	Serbia	16	1	2012–2013	3	0	None
Charles Smith	PG	United States	6	1	1996	9	186	None
Milorad Sokolović	C	Yugoslavia	11	6	1947–1952	104		6× National League champion
Spahi		Yugoslavia		1	1962	8		None
Dušan Spasojević		Yugoslavia	13	1	1974–1975	33		National Cup winner
Zoran Sretenović	PG	Serbia and Montenegro	4	3	1984–1986, 1995–1996	92	292	None
Branislav Stamenković		Yugoslavia	11	3	1976–1979	80	264	None
Aleksandar Stanimirović		Yugoslavia	9	7	1963–1969	114	239	National League champion
Bane Stanković		Yugoslavia		1	1951	5		None
Borislav Stanković	C	Yugoslavia	15	3	1946–1948	21		3× National League champion
Srđan Stanković	C	Serbia and Montenegro	9	1	1992–1993			National League champion
Jovo Stanojević	C	Serbia and Montenegro	9	4	1996–2000	156	1,726	National League champion
Vrbica Stefanov	PG	North Macedonia	4	1	2006	1	13	None
Bogosav Stefanović		Yugoslavia		2	1970–1972	4		National League champion National Cup winner
Ljubiša Stefanović	F	Yugoslavia		1	1985–1986			None
Miodrag Stefanović	G	Yugoslavia	14	1	1946	7	24	National League champion
Saša Stefanović	G	Serbia and Montenegro	4, 10	2	2000–2001, 2003			None
Slavko Stefanović	PF	Serbia and Montenegro	44	1	2004–2005			None
Zoran Stefanović	G/F	Yugoslavia	15	2	1982–1984			None
Stevanović		Yugoslavia		1	1964	7		None
Dušan Stević	F/C	Yugoslavia	7, 14	2	1989–1990, 1995–1996			None
Oliver Stević	PF	Serbia	17, 10	2	2009–2010	82	568	None
Dwight Stewart	F/C	United States	15	1	1996–1997	7	27	None
Kebu Stewart	PF	United States	4	1	2007			None
Stefan Stojačić	SG	Serbia	24	1	2010	16	113	None
Z. Stojačić		Yugoslavia		1	1984–1985	3		None
Predrag Stojaković	SF	Serbia and Montenegro	8	2	1992–1993	39	113	National League champion
Vojislav Stojanović	G/F	Serbia	33	1	2014	6	8	National Cup winner
Miroljub Stojković		Yugoslavia		1	1965	5		None
Vasilije Stojković	G	Yugoslavia	9	4	1946–1949	39		4× National League champion
Dalibor Stupar	G/F	Bosnia and Herzegovina			1997–1998			National League champion
Bojan Subotić	F	Montenegro	17	2	2011–2013	108	625	National Cup winner
Vujadin Subotić	F	Montenegro	4, 30	3	2004–2006; 2008; 2010–2011	157	962	National Cup winner
Radomir Šaper *	G	Yugoslavia		1	1945			None
Filip Šepa	SG	Serbia	24	1	2008–2009	2	0	None
Aleksandar Šeša		Yugoslavia		2	1979–1981	13		None
Mlađan Šilobad	C	Serbia and Montenegro	13, 12	3	1989–1991; 2002–2003	108	659	None
Srđan Škulić (Note: Also referred to as Srđan Škuletić.)		Yugoslavia		9	1963–1971	174	277	National League champion National Cup winner
Mlađen Šljivančanin	SF	Serbia	32	1	2007–2008	54	296	None
Slobodan Šljivančanin	C	North Macedonia	12	1	2000			None
Vladimir Štimac	C	Serbia	30, 51, 91	4	2008–2010; 2015–2016; 2019–2020	188	1,441	Adriatic League champion National League champion

== T to Z ==
Player	Pos.	Nationality	No.	Yrs	Seasons	GP	PS	Notes and accomplishments
Bojan Tadić	PF	Serbia and Montenegro	8	1	1996–1997			None
Dragan Tarlać	C	Yugoslavia	14	2	1990–1992			None
Mike Taylor	PG	United States	14	1	2009–2010	25	262	None
Marko Tejić	F	Serbia	15	3	2013–2016	120	302	Adriatic League champion National League champion 2× National Cup winner
Emanuel Terry	F/C	United States	33	1	2020	16	78	None
Billy Thomas	SG	United States	12	1	2006–2007	22	265	None
Omar Thomas	SF	United States	33	1	2011–2012	38	486	None
Deon Thompson	PF	Ivory Coast	2	1	2017	47	255	Adriatic League champion National League champion National Cup winner
Ryan Thompson	SF	United States	5	1	2015	27	123	None
Vladimir Tica	C	Serbia and Montenegro	9, 13, 14	6	1998–2003; 2007	189	1,110	None
Todorović		Yugoslavia		3	1962–1964	18		None
Miroslav Todosijević	G	Yugoslavia	4	9	1963–1971	172	956	National League champion
Dejan Tomašević	C	Serbia and Montenegro	14	5	1990–1995	151	1,766	2× National League champion
Tomić		Yugoslavia		1	1982–1983	39		None
Slobodan Tomović		Yugoslavia		2	1975–1977	35		None
Tomislav Tomović	PG	Serbia and Montenegro	10	1	2001–2002	14	75	None
Željko Topalović	C	Serbia and Montenegro	11, 15	2	1997–1998, 1999–2000	102	634	National League champion
Milenko Topić	PF	Serbia and Montenegro	11, 14, 15	2	1997–1999	92	1,273	National League champion
Nikola Topić	G	Serbia	44	2	2022–2023	12	26	Adriatic League champion National League champion
Aleksandar Trifunović	G	Serbia and Montenegro	12	8	1986–1988; 1991–1997	292	2,382	2× National League champion
Časlav Trifunović	F	Yugoslavia	15		1989–1990			None
Nenad Trunić	PG	Yugoslavia	4	1	1991–1992			None
Aleksa Uskoković	PG	Serbia	4	2	2020–2021	56	197	Adriatic League champion National League champion National Cup winner
A. Uvalin		Yugoslavia		2	1960–1961	12		None
Nikola Vasić	G	Serbia	20	1	2011–2012	6	37	None
Saša Vasić	F	Yugoslavia	14	2	1989–1991			None
Ratomir Vićentić	C	Yugoslavia	11	8	1958–1965	130	2,122	None
Dragoljub Vidačić	PG	Serbia and Montenegro	4	4	1992–1995; 1998–1999	170	725	2× National League champion
Vidaković		Yugoslavia		2	1959–1960	10		None
Filip Videnov	SG	Bulgaria	6, 24	1	2009–2010	31	370	None
Luca Vildoza #	G	Argentina	1	0	2022–present	0	0	None
Čedomir Vitkovac	SF	Serbia and Montenegro	11	3	2003–2006	173	994	2× National Cup winner
Dejan Voštić	F/C	Serbia and Montenegro		1	2001–2002	2	12	None
Slavko Vraneš	C	Serbia and Montenegro	19	1	2004	3	9	None
M. Vrhovec		Yugoslavia		3	1956–1958	46		None
Dragiša Vučinić	C	Yugoslavia	12	13	1967–1979	354	4,685	FIBA European Cup Winners' Cup champion 2× National League champion 3× National Cup winner
Nikola Vučurović	SF	Montenegro	14	1	2006–2007	8	27	None
Miloš Vujanić	PG	Serbia and Montenegro	13	2	1999–2001	81	701	None
Milutin Vujičić	PG	Serbia	1, 6	1	2021	1	3	National Cup winner
Vujović		Yugoslavia		2	1961–1962	18		None
Dušan Vukčević	G/F	Serbia and Montenegro	6	1	1994–1995			None
Vukčević		Yugoslavia		1	1980–1981	1		None
Rade Vukosavljević	PG	Yugoslavia	15	6	1975–1982	114	450	None
Vladan Vukosavljević	C	Serbia and Montenegro	51	2	2002–2003, 2004–2005	61		None
Corey Walden	G	United States	2	1	2020–2021	58	595	Adriatic League champion National League champion
Tyrone Washington	PF	United States		1	2002	5	40	None
Aaron White	PF	United States	30	1	2021–2022	47	290	Adriatic League champion National League champion National Cup winner
Marcus Williams	PG	United States	3	2	2014–2015	80	674	Adriatic League champion National League champion National Cup winner
Andrew Wisniewski	PG	United States	32	1	2004–2005	34		None
Nate Wolters	PG	United States	0, 3	2	2016–2017, 2021–2022	134	1,216	2× Adriatic League champion National League champion 2× National Cup winner
Jahmar Young	SG	United States	6	1	2010–2011	23	297	None
Aleksandar Zečević	SF	Serbia and Montenegro	11	2	1993–1994	35		National League champion
Maik Zirbes	C	Germany	33	4	2014–2016; 2018–2019; 2021–2022	221	1,930	4× Adriatic League champion 3× National League champion Adriatic SuperCup winner National Cup winner
D. Zoroja		Yugoslavia		2	1962–1963	18		None
Radivoje Živković	C	Yugoslavia	8	7	1973–1980	205	2,880	FIBA European Cup Winners' Cup champion National Cup winner
Rajko Žižić	C	Yugoslavia	13	4	1981–1984; 1986–1987	146	1,869	None
Ljupče Žugić		Yugoslavia	9, 14, 13	8	1971–1979	169	364	FIBA European Cup Winners' Cup champion National League champion

== See also ==
- List of KK Crvena zvezda players with 100 games played
- KK Partizan all-time roster

== Notes ==
Former nationalities

1. Holds Bosnian-Herzegovinian nationality following dissolution of Yugoslavia.
2. Holds Croatian nationality following dissolution of Yugoslavia.
3. Holds Serbian nationality following dissolution of Yugoslavia and Serbia and Montenegro.
4. Holds Montenegrin nationality following dissolution of Yugoslavia and Serbia and Montenegro.

Other nationalities

Other notes
