= 1950 KK Crvena zvezda season =

Crvena zvezda
1950 season
- Chairman: (Socialist Federal Republic of Yugoslavia) Mirko Aksentijević
- Head coach: (Socialist Federal Republic of Yugoslavia) Nebojša Popović
- Yugoslav League: Champions
- Scoring leader: (Socialist Federal Republic of Yugoslavia) Demšar 8.8
- All statistics correct as of July 30, 2017.

The 1950 season is the Crvena zvezda 5th season in the existence of the club. The team played in the Yugoslav Basketball League.

== Players ==
=== Squad information ===
Crvena zvezda roster
Players
Coaches

Pos.	No.	Nat.	Name	Ht.
	9	(Socialist Federal Republic of Yugoslavia)	Alagić, Strahinja
		(Socialist Federal Republic of Yugoslavia)	Aleksić, Stevan
	6	(Socialist Federal Republic of Yugoslavia)	Andrijašević, Đorđe
G	5	(Socialist Federal Republic of Yugoslavia)	Bjegojević, Milan	1.81 m (5 ft 11 in)
	14	(Socialist Federal Republic of Yugoslavia)	Ćurčić, Borislav
F/C	7	(Socialist Federal Republic of Yugoslavia)	Demšar, Ladislav	1.87 m (6 ft 2 in)
F	10	(Socialist Federal Republic of Yugoslavia)	Gec, Aleksandar	1.89 m (6 ft 2 in)
		(Socialist Federal Republic of Yugoslavia)	Jovanović, Borko
SF	12	(Socialist Federal Republic of Yugoslavia)	Kalember, Srđan	1.80 m (5 ft 11 in)
		(Socialist Federal Republic of Yugoslavia)	Krstić, Dimitrije
	8	(Socialist Federal Republic of Yugoslavia)	Popović, Nebojša
	3	(Socialist Federal Republic of Yugoslavia)	Rochlitzer, Tullio
C	11	(Socialist Federal Republic of Yugoslavia)	Sokolović, Milorad	1.90 m (6 ft 3 in)

Head coach

- (Socialist Federal Republic of Yugoslavia) Nebojša Popović

Legend

- (C) Team captain
- Injured

=== Depth chart ===
Pos.	Starting 5	Bench 1	Bench 2	Reserves
C	Ladislav Demšar	Milorad Sokolović
PF	Aleksandar Gec	Borislav Ćurčić	Dimitrije Krstić
SF	Srđan Kalember	Đorđe Andrijašević
SG	Nebojša Popović	Milan Bjegojević	Strahinja Alagić	Stevan Aleksić
PG	Tullio Rochlitzer	Borko Jovanović

=== Players in ===
Position	#	Player	Moving from	Ref.
	14	(Socialist Federal Republic of Yugoslavia) Borislav Ćurčić		
	6	(Socialist Federal Republic of Yugoslavia) Đorđe Andrijašević		
		(Socialist Federal Republic of Yugoslavia) Dimitrije Krstić		
		(Socialist Federal Republic of Yugoslavia) Stevan Aleksić		

=== Players out ===
Position	#	Player	Moving to	Ref.
		(Socialist Federal Republic of Yugoslavia) Vasilije Stojković	Retired	
SF	4	(Socialist Federal Republic of Yugoslavia) Aleksandar Nikolić	(Socialist Federal Republic of Yugoslavia) Železničar Čačak	
		(Socialist Federal Republic of Yugoslavia) Mića Marinković	(Socialist Federal Republic of Yugoslavia) BSK	
		(Socialist Federal Republic of Yugoslavia) Vladimir Gaćinović		

== Competitions ==
=== Overall ===
Competition	Started round	Final position / round	First match	Last match
Yugoslav Federal League	Matchday 1	Champions	1950	1950

Source: Competitions

=== Overview ===
Competition	Record							
Competition	Pld	W	D	L	PF	PA	PD	Win %
Serbian League	0	0	0	0	0	0	+0	—
Yugoslav Federal League	18	16	0	2	839	565	+274	88.89
Total	18	16	0	2	839	565	+274	88.89

Last updated: July 30, 2017
Source: Competitions

=== Yugoslav Federal League ===
==== League table ====
Pos	Teams	Pts	Pld	W	L	PF	PA	Champion or relegation
1.	Crvena zvezda	32	18	16	2	839	565	Champion
2.	Partizan	32	18	16	2	791	613	
3.	Železničar Ljubljana	22	18	11	7	691	635	
4.	BSK	20	18	10	8	656	697	
5.	Mladost	18	18	9	9	626	615	

Source: Yugoslav First Basketball League Archive

Win Loss

==== Regular season ====
1950	Crvena zvezda	51–29	Zadar	Belgrade

1950	Zadar	26–32	Crvena zvezda	Zadar

1950	Crvena zvezda	37–31	Mladost	Belgrade

1950	Mladost	36–31	Crvena zvezda	Zagreb

1950	Crvena zvezda	49–26	Jedinstvo	Belgrade

1950	Jedinstvo	39–45	Crvena zvezda	Zagreb

1950	Crvena zvezda	40–27	Proleter Zrenjanin	Belgrade

1950	Proleter Zrenjanin	23–38	Crvena zvezda	Zrenjanin

1950	Crvena zvezda	50–36	Železničar Belgrade	Belgrade

1950	Železničar Belgrade	31–47	Crvena zvezda	Belgrade

1950	Crvena zvezda	69–39	Enotnost	Belgrade

1950	Enotnost	32–60	Crvena zvezda	Ljubljana

1950	Crvena zvezda	66–33	BSK	Belgrade

1950	BSK	32–58	Crvena zvezda	Belgrade

1950	Crvena zvezda	56–32	Partizan	Belgrade

1950	Partizan	22–24	Crvena zvezda	Belgrade

1950	Crvena zvezda	51–30	Železničar Ljubljana	Belgrade

1950	Železničar Ljubljana	41–35	Crvena zvezda	Ljubljana

Source: KK Crvena zvezda History

== Statistics ==
Legend
GP	Games played
PPG	Points per game

*	Led the league

Player	GP	PPG
Strahinja Alagić	15	1.9
Stevan Aleksić	1	0.0
Đorđe Andrijašević	13	2.5
Milan Bjegojević	16	4.4
Borislav Ćurčić	16	4.1
Ladislav Demšar	18	8.8
Aleksandar Gec	18	7.2
Borko Jovanović	15	5.0
Srđan Kalember	14	8.1
Dimitrije Krstić	4	2
Nebojša Popović	9	5.8
Tullio Rochlitzer	9	5.4
Milorad Sokolović	16	3.9

Source: Crvena zvezda
