= 1949 KK Crvena zvezda season =

Crvena zvezda
1949 season
- Chairman: (Socialist Federal Republic of Yugoslavia) Mirko Aksentijević
- Head coach: (Socialist Federal Republic of Yugoslavia) Nebojša Popović
- Yugoslav League: Champions
- Scoring leader: (Socialist Federal Republic of Yugoslavia) Popović 9.1
- Biggest win: vs Lokomotiva Rijeka 86–24
- Biggest defeat: vs Partizan 13–21
- All statistics correct as of July 30, 2017.

The 1949 season is the Crvena zvezda's 4th season in the existence of the club. The team played in the Yugoslav Basketball League.

== Players ==
=== Squad information ===
Crvena zvezda roster
Players
Coaches

| Pos. | No. | Nat. | Name | Ht. |
|---|---|---|---|---|
| | | (Socialist Federal Republic of Yugoslavia) | Alagić, Strahinja |
| G | 5 | (Socialist Federal Republic of Yugoslavia) | Bjegojević, Milan | 1.81 m (5 ft 11 in) |
| F/C | 7 | (Socialist Federal Republic of Yugoslavia) | Demšar, Ladislav | 1.87 m (6 ft 2 in) |
| | | (Socialist Federal Republic of Yugoslavia) | Gaćinović, Vladimir |
| F | 10 | (Socialist Federal Republic of Yugoslavia) | Gec, Aleksandar | 1.89 m (6 ft 2 in) |
| | 13 | (Socialist Federal Republic of Yugoslavia) | Jovanović, Borko |
| SF | 12 | (Socialist Federal Republic of Yugoslavia) | Kalember, Srđan | 1.80 m (5 ft 11 in) |
| | | (Socialist Federal Republic of Yugoslavia) | Marinković, Mića |
| SF | 4 | (Socialist Federal Republic of Yugoslavia) | Nikolić, Aleksandar | 1.73 m (5 ft 8 in) |
| | 8 | (Socialist Federal Republic of Yugoslavia) | Popović, Nebojša (C) |
| | 3 | (Socialist Federal Republic of Yugoslavia) | Rochlitzer, Tullio |
| C | 11 | (Socialist Federal Republic of Yugoslavia) | Sokolović, Milorad | 1.90 m (6 ft 3 in) |
| G | 9 | (Socialist Federal Republic of Yugoslavia) | Stojković, Vasilije | 1.78 m (5 ft 10 in) |

Head coach

- (Socialist Federal Republic of Yugoslavia) Nebojša Popović

Legend

- (C) Team captain
- Injured

=== Depth chart ===
| Pos. | Starting 5 | Bench 1 | Bench 2 | Reserves |
|---|---|---|---|---|
| C | Ladislav Demšar | Milorad Sokolović |
| PF | Aleksandar Gec | Vasilije Stojković |
| SF | Srđan Kalember | Aleksandar Nikolić | Mića Marinković | Vladimir Gaćinović |
| SG | Nebojša Popović | Strahinja Alagić | Milan Bjegojević |
| PG | Tullio Rochlitzer | Borko Jovanović |

=== Players In ===
| Position | # | Player | Moving from | Ref. |
|---|---|---|---|---|
| | 3 | (Socialist Federal Republic of Yugoslavia) Tullio Rochlitzer | (Socialist Federal Republic of Yugoslavia) Zadar | |
| | | (Socialist Federal Republic of Yugoslavia) Mića Marinković | | |
| | 13 | (Socialist Federal Republic of Yugoslavia) Borko Jovanović | | |

=== Players Out ===
| Position | # | Player | Moving to | Ref. |
|---|---|---|---|---|
| | | (Socialist Federal Republic of Yugoslavia) Milan Blagojević | | |
| | | (Socialist Federal Republic of Yugoslavia) Hristofer Dimitrijević | | |
| C | 15 | (Socialist Federal Republic of Yugoslavia) Borislav Stanković | (Socialist Federal Republic of Yugoslavia) Železničar Belgrade | |
| | | (Socialist Federal Republic of Yugoslavia) Đorđe Lazić | (Socialist Federal Republic of Yugoslavia) Partizan | |
| | | (Socialist Federal Republic of Yugoslavia) Dragan Godžić | Compulsory military service | |
| | | (Socialist Federal Republic of Yugoslavia) Rade Jovanović | | |

== Competitions ==
=== Overall ===
| Competition | Started round | Final position / round | First match | Last match |
|---|---|---|---|---|
| Yugoslav Federal League | Matchday 1 | Champions | 1949 | 1949 |

Source: Competitions

=== Overview ===
| Competition | Record | | | | | | | |
| Competition | Pld | W | D | L | PF | PA | PD | Win % |
|---|---|---|---|---|---|---|---|---|
| Serbian League | 0 | 0 | 0 | 0 | 0 | 0 | +0 | — |
| Yugoslav Federal League | 18 | 17 | 0 | 1 | 796 | 475 | +321 | 94.44 |
| Total | 18 | 17 | 0 | 1 | 796 | 475 | +321 | 94.44 |

Last updated: July 30, 2017
Source: Competitions

=== Yugoslav Federal League ===
==== League table ====
| Pos | Teams | Pts | Pld | W | L | PF | PA | Champion or relegation |
|---|---|---|---|---|---|---|---|---|
| 1. | Crvena zvezda | 34 | 18 | 17 | 1 | 796 | 475 | Champion |
| 2. | Partizan | 32 | 18 | 16 | 2 | 719 | 434 | |
| 3. | Mladost Zagreb | 24 | 18 | 12 | 6 | 554 | 491 | |
| 4. | Jedinstvo Zagreb | 22 | 18 | 11 | 7 | 676 | 657 | |
| 5. | Metalac Beograd | 18 | 18 | 9 | 9 | 592 | 527 | |

Source: Yugoslav First Basketball League Archive

Win Loss

==== Regular season ====
| 1949 | Crvena zvezda | 53–25 | Proleter Zrenjanin | Belgrade |

| 1949 | Proleter Zrenjanin | 29–53 | Crvena zvezda | Zrenjanin |

| 1949 | Crvena zvezda | 42–28 | Lokomotiva Rijeka | Belgrade |

| 1949 | Lokomotiva Rijeka | 24–86 | Crvena zvezda | Rijeka |

| 1949 | Crvena zvezda | 45–27 | Železničar Ljubljana | Belgrade |

| 1949 | Železničar Ljubljana | 32–48 | Crvena zvezda | Ljubljana |

| 1949 | Crvena zvezda | 43–26 | Jedinstvo | Belgrade |

| 1949 | Jedinstvo | 37–56 | Crvena zvezda | Zagreb |

| 1949 | Crvena zvezda | 34–31 | Metalac Beograd | Belgrade |

| 1949 | Metalac Beograd | 30–43 | Crvena zvezda | Belgrade |

| 1949 | Crvena zvezda | 35–17 | Mladost | Belgrade |

| 1949 | Mladost | 29–45 | Crvena zvezda | Zagreb |

| 1949 | Crvena zvezda | 48–30 | Milicionar Sarajevo | Belgrade |

| 1949 | Milicionar Sarajevo | 0–20 | Crvena zvezda | Sarajevo |

| June 25, 1949 | Crvena zvezda | 13–21 | Partizan | Belgrade |

| 1949 | Partizan | 29–33 | Crvena zvezda | Belgrade |

| 1949 | Crvena zvezda | 54–31 | Enotnost | Belgrade |

| 1949 | Enotnost | 29–45 | Crvena zvezda | Ljubljana |

Source: KK Crvena zvezda History

== Statistics ==
Legend
| GP | Games played |
| PPG | Points per game |

| * | Led the league |

| Player | GP | PPG |
|---|---|---|
| Strahinja Alagić | 12 | 2.7 |
| Milan Bjegojević | 10 | 1.8 |
| Ladislav Demšar | 18 | 8.3 |
| Vladimir Gaćinović | 5 | 0.0 |
| Aleksandar Gec | 17 | 4.8 |
| Borko Jovanović | 13 | 2.5 |
| Srđan Kalember | 16 | 4.3 |
| Mića Marinković | 16 | 0.9 |
| Aleksandar Nikolić | 18 | 2.6 |
| Nebojša Popović | 18 | 9.1 |
| Tullio Rochlitzer | 18 | 7.4 |
| Milorad Sokolović | 17 | 2.0 |
| Vasilije Stojković | 16 | 1.3 |

Source: Crvena zvezda
