= 1948 KK Crvena zvezda season =

Crvena zvezda
1948 season
- Chairman: (Socialist Federal Republic of Yugoslavia) Mirko Aksentijević
- Head coach: (Socialist Federal Republic of Yugoslavia) Nebojša Popović
- Serbian League: Qualified
- Yugoslav League: Champions
- Scoring leader: (Socialist Federal Republic of Yugoslavia) Demšar 14.2
- Biggest win: vs Egység 68–24
- Biggest defeat: vs Mladost 27–29
- All statistics correct as of July 30, 2017.

The 1948 season is the Crvena zvezda 3rd season in the existence of the club. The team had played in the Yugoslav Basketball League.

== Players ==
=== Squad information ===
Crvena zvezda roster
Players
Coaches

Pos.	No.	Nat.	Name	Ht.
	3	(Socialist Federal Republic of Yugoslavia)	Alagić, Strahinja
G		(Socialist Federal Republic of Yugoslavia)	Bjegojević, Milan	1.81 m (5 ft 11 in)
		(Socialist Federal Republic of Yugoslavia)	Blagojević, Milan
F/C	4	(Socialist Federal Republic of Yugoslavia)	Demšar, Ladislav	1.87 m (6 ft 2 in)
		(Socialist Federal Republic of Yugoslavia)	Dimitrijević, Hristofor
	9	(Socialist Federal Republic of Yugoslavia)	Gaćinović, Vladimir
G	10	(Socialist Federal Republic of Yugoslavia)	Gec, Aleksandar	1.89 m (6 ft 2 in)
		(Socialist Federal Republic of Yugoslavia)	Godžić, Dragan
		(Socialist Federal Republic of Yugoslavia)	Jovanović, Rade
SF	12	(Socialist Federal Republic of Yugoslavia)	Kalember, Srđan	1.80 m (5 ft 11 in)
		(Socialist Federal Republic of Yugoslavia)	Lazić, Đorđe
SF	5	(Socialist Federal Republic of Yugoslavia)	Nikolić, Aleksandar	1.73 m (5 ft 8 in)
	8	(Socialist Federal Republic of Yugoslavia)	Popović, Nebojša (C)
C	11	(Socialist Federal Republic of Yugoslavia)	Sokolović, Milorad	1.90 m (6 ft 3 in)
C	7	(Socialist Federal Republic of Yugoslavia)	Stanković, Borislav
G	6	(Socialist Federal Republic of Yugoslavia)	Stojković, Vasilije	1.78 m (5 ft 10 in)

Head coach

- (Socialist Federal Republic of Yugoslavia) Nebojša Popović

Legend

- (C) Team captain
- Injured

=== Depth chart ===
Pos.	Starting 5	Bench 1	Bench 2	Reserves
C	Ladislav Demšar	Milorad Sokolović
PF	Aleksandar Gec	Borislav Stanković		Milan Blagojević
SF	Srđan Kalember	Vasilije Stojković	Dragan Godžić	Vladimir Gaćinović
SG	Aleksandar Nikolić	Milan Bjegojević	Hristofer Dimitrijević	Đorđe Lazić
PG	Nebojša Popović	Strahinja Alagić		Rade Jovanović

=== Players In ===
No.	Pos.	Nat.	Name	Moving from	
7	C	(Socialist Federal Republic of Yugoslavia)	Ladislav Demšar	Egység Novi Sad	(Socialist Federal Republic of Yugoslavia)

== Competitions ==
=== Overall ===
Competition	Started round	Final position / round	First match	Last match
Serbian State League	Matchday 1	Qualified	1948	1948
Yugoslav Federal League	Matchday 1	Champions	1948	1948

Source: Competitions

=== Overview ===
Competition	Record							
Competition	Pld	W	D	L	PF	PA	PD	Win %
Serbian State League	4	4	0	0	225	120	+105	100.00
Yugoslav Federal League	5	4	0	1	229	145	+84	80.00
Total	9	8	0	1	454	265	+189	88.89

Last updated: July 30, 2017
Source: Competitions

=== Serbian State League ===
==== League table ====
Pos	Teams	Pts	Pld	W	L	PF	PA	Champion or relegation
1.	Crvena zvezda	8	4	4	0	225	120	Qualified
2.	Metalac Beograd	6	4	3	1	179	135	Qualified
3.	Proleter Zrenjanin	4	4	2	2	188	122	Qualified
4.	Egység Novi Sad	2	4	1	3	157	206	
5.	Borac Čačak	0	4	0	4	114	268	

Source: OKK Beograd

Win Loss

==== Matches ====
1948	Crvena zvezda	68–24	Egység Novi Sad

1948	Crvena zvezda	39–32	Proleter Zrenjanin

1948 3	Crvena zvezda	51–30	Metalac Beograd

1948	Crvena zvezda	68–34	Borac Čačak

Source: KK Crvena zvezda History

=== Yugoslav Federal League ===
==== League table ====
Pos	Teams	Pts	Pld	W	L	PF	PA	Champion or relegation
1.	Crvena zvezda	8	5	4	1	229	145	Champion
2.	Proleter Zrenjanin	8	5	4	1	196	156	
3.	Jedinstvo	6	5	3	2	188	192	
4.	Enotnost	4	5	2	3	151	200	
5.	Mladost	2	5	1	4	142	163	

Source: Yugoslav First Basketball League Archive, OKK Beograd

Win Loss

==== Matches ====
1948 1	Crvena zvezda	68–30	Metalac	Belgrade

1948	Crvena zvezda	45–30	Jedinstvo	Belgrade

1948	Crvena zvezda	46–30	Proleter Zrenjanin	Belgrade

1948	Crvena zvezda	43–26	Enotnost	Belgrade

1948	Crvena zvezda	27–29	Mladost	Belgrade

Source: KK Crvena zvezda History

== Statistics ==
Legend
GP	Games played
PPG	Points per game

*	Led the league

Player	GP	PPG
Strahinja Alagić	8	2.1
Milan Bjegojević	9	1.8
Milan Blagojević	4	0.5
Ladislav Demšar	9	14.2
Hristofer Dimitrijević	5	1.8
Vladimir Gaćinović	3	0.0
Aleksandar Gec	9	7.9
Dragan Godžić	6	1.0
Rade Jovanović	1	1.0
Srđan Kalember	9	4.1
Đorđe Lazić	4	0.0
Aleksandar Nikolić	9	3.1
Nebojša Popović	9	8.3
Milorad Sokolović	8	3.8
Borislav Stanković	5	4.8
Vasilije Stojković	7	1.4

Source: Crvena zvezda
