= 1947 KK Crvena zvezda season =

Crvena zvezda
1947 season
- Chairman: (Socialist Federal Republic of Yugoslavia) Mirko Aksentijević
- Head coach: (Socialist Federal Republic of Yugoslavia) Nebojša Popović
- Serbian League: Qualified
- Yugoslav League: Champions
- Scoring leader: (Socialist Federal Republic of Yugoslavia) Popović 16.2
- Biggest win: 110–15 Proleter Priština
- Biggest defeat: None
- All statistics correct as of July 30, 2017.

The 1947 season is the Crvena zvezda 2nd season in the existence of the club. The team played in the Yugoslav Basketball League.

== Players ==
=== Squad information ===
Crvena zvezda roster
Players
Coaches

Pos.	No.	Nat.	Name	Ht.
		(Socialist Federal Republic of Yugoslavia)	Alagić, Strahinja
G	5	(Socialist Federal Republic of Yugoslavia)	Bjegojević, Milan	1.81 m (5 ft 11 in)
		(Socialist Federal Republic of Yugoslavia)	Blagojević, Milan
		(Socialist Federal Republic of Yugoslavia)	Dimitrijević, Hristofor
		(Socialist Federal Republic of Yugoslavia)	Gaćinović, Vladimir
G	10	(Socialist Federal Republic of Yugoslavia)	Gec, Aleksandar	1.89 m (6 ft 2 in)
		(Socialist Federal Republic of Yugoslavia)	Godžić, Dragan
		(Socialist Federal Republic of Yugoslavia)	Jovanović, Rade
SF	12	(Socialist Federal Republic of Yugoslavia)	Kalember, Srđan	1.80 m (5 ft 11 in)
		(Socialist Federal Republic of Yugoslavia)	Lazić, Đorđe
SF	4	(Socialist Federal Republic of Yugoslavia)	Nikolić, Aleksandar	1.73 m (5 ft 8 in)
	8	(Socialist Federal Republic of Yugoslavia)	Popović, Nebojša (C)
C	11	(Socialist Federal Republic of Yugoslavia)	Sokolović, Milorad	1.90 m (6 ft 3 in)
C	15	(Socialist Federal Republic of Yugoslavia)	Stanković, Borislav
G	9	(Socialist Federal Republic of Yugoslavia)	Stojković, Vasilije	1.78 m (5 ft 10 in)

Head coach

- (Socialist Federal Republic of Yugoslavia) Nebojša Popović

Legend

- (C) Team captain
- Injured

=== Depth chart ===
Pos.	Starting 5	Bench 1	Bench 2	Reserves
C	Borislav Stanković	Milorad Sokolović
PF	Aleksandar Gec	Vasilije Stojković
SF	Srđan Kalember	Dragan Godžić	Milan Bjegojević	Vladimir Gaćinović
SG	Milan Blagojević	Aleksandar Nikolić	Đorđe Lazić	Hristofer Dimitrijević
PG	Nebojša Popović	Strahinja Alagić		Rade Jovanović

=== Players In ===
No.	Pos.	Nat.	Name	Moving from	
4	SF	(Socialist Federal Republic of Yugoslavia)	Aleksandar Nikolić	Partizan	(Socialist Federal Republic of Yugoslavia)
		(Socialist Federal Republic of Yugoslavia)	Strahinja Alagić	Partizan	(Socialist Federal Republic of Yugoslavia)
5		(Socialist Federal Republic of Yugoslavia)	Milan Bjegojević		
		(Socialist Federal Republic of Yugoslavia)	Milan Blagojević		
		(Socialist Federal Republic of Yugoslavia)	Hristofer Dimitrijević		
		(Socialist Federal Republic of Yugoslavia)	Vladimir Gaćinović		(United States)
		(Socialist Federal Republic of Yugoslavia)	Dragan Godžić	Metalac Beograd	(Socialist Federal Republic of Yugoslavia)
11	C	(Socialist Federal Republic of Yugoslavia)	Milorad Sokolović	Metalac Beograd	(Socialist Federal Republic of Yugoslavia)
		(Socialist Federal Republic of Yugoslavia)	Đorđe Lazić		

=== Players Out ===
No.	Pos.	Nat.	Name	Moving to
		(Socialist Federal Republic of Yugoslavia)	Tihomir Balubdžić	
		(Socialist Federal Republic of Yugoslavia)	Vladimir Banjac	
		(Socialist Federal Republic of Yugoslavia)	Ivan Dimić	
		(Socialist Federal Republic of Yugoslavia)	Relja Mešterović	
14		(Socialist Federal Republic of Yugoslavia)	Miodrag Stefanović	

== Competitions ==
=== Overall ===
Competition	Started round	Final position / round	First match	Last match
Serbian State League	Matchday 1	Qualified	1947	1947
Yugoslav Federal League	Matchday 1	Champions	1947	1947

Source: Competitions

=== Overview ===
Competition	Record							
Competition	Pld	W	D	L	PF	PA	PD	Win %
Serbian State League	5	5	0	0	356	141	+215	100.00
Yugoslav Federal League	4	4	0	0	167	118	+49	100.00
Total	9	9	0	0	523	259	+264	100.00

Last updated: July 30, 2017
Source: Competitions

=== Serbian State League ===
==== League table ====
Pos	Teams	Pts	Pld	W	L	PF	PA	Champion or relegation
1.	Crvena zvezda	10	5	5	0	356	141	Qualified for Yugoslav League
2.	Proleter Zrenjanin	8	5	4	1	257	87	Qualification
3.	Metalac	6	5	3	2	251	180	Qualification
4.	Egység Novi Sad	4	5	2	3	294	185	
5.	Omladinac	2	5	1	4	123	311	

Source: OKK Beograd

Win Loss

==== Matches ====
1947	Crvena zvezda	32–22	Proleter Zrenjanin

1947 3	Crvena zvezda	64–40	Metalac Beograd

1947	Crvena zvezda	65–44	Egység Novi Sad

1947	Crvena zvezda	80–20	Omladinac Kragujevac

1947	Crvena zvezda	110–15	Proleter Priština

Source: KK Crvena zvezda History

=== Yugoslav Federal League ===
==== League table ====
Pos	Teams	Pts	Pld	W	L	PF	PA	Champion or relegation
1.	Crvena Zvezda	8	4	4	0	167	118	Champion
2.	Zadar	4	4	2	2	192	158	
3.	Partizan	4	4	2	2	179	152	
4.	Proleter Zrenjanin	4	4	2	2	178	159	
5.	Jedinstvo Zagreb	0	4	0	4	118	247	

Source: Yugoslav First Basketball League Archive

Win Loss

==== Matches ====
September 1947	Crvena zvezda	52–21	Jedinstvo Zagreb	Zagreb

September 1947	Crvena zvezda	34–31	Zadar	Zagreb

28 September 1947	Crvena zvezda	36–29	Partizan	Zagreb
	Scoring by half: 19–18, 17–11
	Pts: Nebojša Popović 8		Pts: Vlado Kraucer 7

September 1947	Crvena zvezda	45–37	Proleter Zrenjanin	Zagreb

Source: KK Crvena zvezda History

== Statistics ==
Legend
GP	Games played
PPG	Points per game

*	Led the league

Player	GP	PPG
Strahinja Alagić	8	3.1
Milan Bjegojević	5	1.0
Milan Blagojević	9	5.8
Hristofer Dimitrijević	1	0.0
Vladimir Gaćinović	2	0.0
Aleksandar Gec	9	4.2
Dragan Godžić	9	2.0
Rade Jovanović	2	0.0
Srđan Kalember	7	6.4
Đorđe Lazić	3	0.0
Aleksandar Nikolić	7	3.0
Nebojša Popović	9	16.2
Milorad Sokolović	9	2.4
Borislav Stanković	9	9.9
Vasilije Stojković	9	5.2

Source: Crvena zvezda
