= 1951 Yugoslav First Basketball League =

Yugoslav First Basketball League
- Season: 1951
- Games played: 132
- Teams: 12

Regular season
- Top seed: Crvena zvezda

Finals
- Champions: Crvena zvezda (6th title)
- Runners-up: Partizan

Statistical leaders
Points	(Socialist Federal Republic of Yugoslavia) Radmilo Mišić	18.0
- All statistics correct as of 26 April 2017.

The 1951 Yugoslav First Basketball League season is the 7th season of the Yugoslav First Basketball League, the highest professional basketball league in SFR Yugoslavia.

== Teams ==
(Socialist Republic of Serbia) PR Serbia
- BSK
- Crvena Zvezda
- Egység Novi Sad
- Partizan
- Proleter Zrenjanin
- Železničar Belgrade
(Socialist Republic of Croatia) PR Croatia
- Lokomotiva Zagreb
- Mladost Zagreb
- Jedinstvo
- Zadar
(Socialist Republic of Slovenia) PR Slovenia
- Enotnost
- Železničar Ljubljana

== Regular season ==
=== League table ===
Pos	Teams	Pts	Pld	W	D	L	PF	PA	Champion or relegation
1.	Crvena Zvezda	38	22	18	2	2	1149	761	Champion
2.	Partizan	38	22	18	2	2	1119	814	
3.	Mladost	28	22	14	0	8	863	799	
4.	Zadar	25	22	12	1	9	703	693	
5.	Železničar Ljubljana	21 (-1)	22	9	4	9	888	867	
6.	Enotnost	21	22	10	1	11	962	981	
7.	Proleter Zrenjanin	18	22	9	0	13	748	871	
8.	Železničar Belgrade	18	22	9	0	13	821	1002	
9.	Jedinstvo	17	22	8	1	13	953	1058	
10.	BSK	16	22	7	2	13	776	827	
11.	Lokomotiva	12	22	6	0	16	769	902	
12.	Egység Novi Sad	11	22	5	1	16	859	1035	

== Winning Roster ==
The winning roster of Crvena zvezda:

- (Socialist Federal Republic of Yugoslavia) Milorad Sokolović
- (Socialist Federal Republic of Yugoslavia) Ðorđe Andrijašević
- (Socialist Federal Republic of Yugoslavia) Borislav Ćurčić
- (Socialist Federal Republic of Yugoslavia) Srđan Kalember
- (Socialist Federal Republic of Yugoslavia) Milan Bjegojević
- (Socialist Federal Republic of Yugoslavia) Aleksandar Gec
- (Socialist Federal Republic of Yugoslavia) Borko Jovanović
- (Socialist Federal Republic of Yugoslavia) Nebojša Popović
- (Socialist Federal Republic of Yugoslavia) Dragan Godžić
- (Socialist Federal Republic of Yugoslavia) Ladislav Demšar
- (Socialist Federal Republic of Yugoslavia) Strahinja Alagić
- (Socialist Federal Republic of Yugoslavia) Dimitrije Krstić
- (Socialist Federal Republic of Yugoslavia) Tullio Rochlitzer

Coach: (Socialist Federal Republic of Yugoslavia) Nebojša Popović
