= 1949 Yugoslav First Basketball League =

Yugoslav First Basketball League
- Season: 1949
- Games played: 90
- Teams: 10

Regular season
- Top seed: Crvena zvezda

Finals
- Champions: Crvena zvezda (4th title)
- Runners-up: Partizan
- All statistics correct as of 26 April 2017.

The 1949 Yugoslav First Basketball League season is the 5th season of the Yugoslav First Basketball League, the highest professional basketball league in SFR Yugoslavia.

It was the first time the competition was held as a traditional league with every team playing every other team twice, home and away. In previous years, the competition had been held as a tournament in a single location.

== Teams ==
(Socialist Republic of Serbia) PR Serbia
- Crvena Zvezda
- Metalac Beograd
- Partizan
- Proleter Zrenjanin
(Socialist Republic of Croatia) PR Croatia
- Jedinstvo
- Lokomotiva Rijeka
- Mladost Zagreb
(Socialist Republic of Slovenia) PR Slovenia
- Enotnost
- Železničar Ljubljana
(Socialist Republic of Bosnia and Herzegovina) PR Bosnia and Herzegovina
- Milicionar Sarajevo

== Regular season ==
=== League table ===
Pos	Teams	Pts	Pld	W	L	PF	PA	Champion or relegation
1.	Crvena zvezda	34	18	17	1	796	475	Champion
2.	Partizan	32	18	16	2	719	434	
3.	Mladost	24	18	12	6	554	491	
4.	Jedinstvo	22	18	11	7	676	657	
5.	Metalac	18	18	9	9	592	527	
6.	Železničar Ljubljana	16	18	8	10	592	567	
7.	Enotnost	16	18	8	10	556	585	
8.	Proleter Zrenjanin	10	18	5	13	512	665	
9.	Lokomotiva Rijeka	6	18	3	15	495	795	
10.	Milicionar Sarajevo	2	18	1	17	228	524	

== Winning Roster ==
The winning roster of Crvena zvezda:

- (Socialist Federal Republic of Yugoslavia) Nebojša Popović
- (Socialist Federal Republic of Yugoslavia) Tullio Rochlitzer
- (Socialist Federal Republic of Yugoslavia) Vasilije Stojković
- (Socialist Federal Republic of Yugoslavia) Ladislav Demšar
- (Socialist Federal Republic of Yugoslavia) Aleksandar Gec
- (Socialist Federal Republic of Yugoslavia) Milorad Sokolović
- (Socialist Federal Republic of Yugoslavia) Srđan Kalember
- (Socialist Federal Republic of Yugoslavia) Borko Jovanović
- (Socialist Federal Republic of Yugoslavia) Mića Marinković
- (Socialist Federal Republic of Yugoslavia) Strahinja Alagić
- (Socialist Federal Republic of Yugoslavia) Aleksandar Nikolić
- (Socialist Federal Republic of Yugoslavia) Milan Bjegojević
- (Socialist Federal Republic of Yugoslavia) Vlada Gaćinović

Coach: (Socialist Federal Republic of Yugoslavia) Nebojša Popović
