= 1950 Yugoslav First Basketball League =

Yugoslav First Basketball League
- Season: 1950
- Games played: 90
- Teams: 10

Regular season
- Top seed: Crvena zvezda

Finals
- Champions: Crvena zvezda (5th title)
- Runners-up: Partizan
- All statistics correct as of 26 April 2017.

The 1950 Yugoslav First Basketball League season is the 6th season of the Yugoslav First Basketball League, the highest professional basketball league in SFR Yugoslavia.

== Teams ==
(Socialist Republic of Serbia) PR Serbia
- BSK
- Crvena Zvezda
- Partizan
- Proleter Zrenjanin
- Železničar Belgrade
(Socialist Republic of Croatia) PR Croatia
- Mladost Zagreb
- Jedinstvo
- Zadar
(Socialist Republic of Slovenia) PR Slovenia
- Enotnost
- Železničar Ljubljana

== Regular season ==
=== League table ===
Pos	Teams	Pts	Pld	W	L	PF	PA	Champion or relegation
1.	Crvena Zvezda	32	18	16	2	839	565	Champion
2.	Partizan	32	18	16	2	791	613	
3.	Železničar Ljubljana	22	18	11	7	691	635	
4.	BSK	20	18	10	8	656	697	
5.	Mladost	18	18	9	9	626	615	
6.	Železničar Belgrade	16	18	8	10	676	658	
7.	Zadar	14	18	7	11	543	645	
8.	Jedinstvo	10	18	5	13	684	766	
9.	Proleter Zrenjanin	10	18	5	13	572	689	
10.	Enotnost	6	18	3	15	614	809	

== Winning Roster ==
The winning roster of Crvena Zvezda:

- (Socialist Federal Republic of Yugoslavia) Nebojša Popović
- (Socialist Federal Republic of Yugoslavia) Milan Bjegojević
- (Socialist Federal Republic of Yugoslavia) Ladislav Demšar
- (Socialist Federal Republic of Yugoslavia) Strahinja Alagić
- (Socialist Federal Republic of Yugoslavia) Aleksandar Gec
- (Socialist Federal Republic of Yugoslavia) Milorad Sokolović
- (Socialist Federal Republic of Yugoslavia) Srđan Kalember
- (Socialist Federal Republic of Yugoslavia) Borislav Ćurčić
- (Socialist Federal Republic of Yugoslavia) Dimitrije Krstić
- (Socialist Federal Republic of Yugoslavia) Tullio Rochlitzer
- (Socialist Federal Republic of Yugoslavia) Borko Jovanović
- (Socialist Federal Republic of Yugoslavia) Đorđe Andrijašević
- (Socialist Federal Republic of Yugoslavia) Stevan Aleksić

Coach: (Socialist Federal Republic of Yugoslavia) Nebojša Popović
