= Borko Jovanović =

Serbian basketball player

Career information
- Playing career: 1949–1958
- Number: 13

Career history
- 1949–1958: Crvena zvezda

Career highlights
- 7× Yugoslav League champion (1949–1955)

Borivoje "Borko" Jovanović (Serbian Cyrillic: Боривоје "Борко" Јовановић) was a Serbian basketball player. He represented the Yugoslavia national basketball team internationally.

== Playing career ==
Jovanović played for a Belgrade-based team Crvena zvezda of the Yugoslav First League during 1950s. His teammates were Milan Bjegojević, Ladislav Demšar, Borislav Ćurčić, Dragan Godžić, Aleksandar Gec, Đorđe Andrijašević and many others. He won seven Yugoslav Championships with the Zvezda. Over nine seasons with the Zvezda he played 127 games.

In July 1950, he was a member of the Zvezda squad that won an international cup tournament in Milan, Italy.

== National team career ==
Jovanović was a member of the Yugoslavia national basketball team that placed th at the 1953 European Championship in Moscow, the Soviet Union. Over two tournament games, he averaged 3.0 points per game.

== Personal life ==
Jovanović had one brother, Slavoljub "Slava", who was a basketball player, also. Slava played for BSK from 1951 to 1953.

== Career achievements and awards ==
- Yugoslav League champion: 7 (with Crvena zvezda: 1949, 1950, 1951, 1952, 1953, 1954, 1955).

== See also ==
- List of KK Crvena zvezda players with 100 games played
- Jovanović (family name)
