= Zlatko Savović =

Bosnian-American basketball player

Personal information
- Born: September 20, 1980 (age 46) Banja Luka, Yugoslavia
- Listed height: 1.90 m (6 ft 3 in)
- Listed weight: 90 kg (198 lb)

Career information
- High school: Everett High School (Everett, Washington)
- College: Lehigh (1999–2003)
- NBA draft: 2003: undrafted
- Playing career: 2003–2004, 2010
- Position: Point guard
- Number: 10

Career history
- 2003–2004: Ventspils
- 2004: Crvena zvezda
- 2010: Tacoma Thunder

Career highlights
- All-Patriot League First-Team (2003)

Zlatko Savović (born September 20, 1980) is a Bosnian-American former professional basketball player.

== Early life ==
Born in Banja Luka, Yugoslavia to a Bosnian Serb father Božidar and a Bosniak mother Behrija. In 1993, he moved to Everett, Washington with his parents. There he attended Everett High School.

== College career ==
A point guard, Savović played four seasons of college basketball at the Lehigh University from 1999 to 2003. In his senior year, he recorded 14.6 points, 4.1 rebounds, 4.1 assists, and 1.5 steals per game and was named to the All-Patriot League First-Team in the 2002–03 season.

He holds a bachelor's degree in mechanical engineering from Lehigh University.

== Professional career ==
After went undrafted in the 2003 NBA draft, Savović moved to Europe where played professionally for Ventspils (Latvia) and Crvena zvezda (ABA League).

In 2010, Savović joined the Tacoma Thunder of the National Athletic Basketball League.
