= Milan Ćurčić =

Serbian basketball player (born 1976)

Personal information
- Born: 19 July 1976 (age 50) Belgrade, SR Serbia, Yugoslavia
- Listed height: 2.03 m (6 ft 8 in)

Career information
- College: Lindsey Wilson (1996–1998)
- NBA draft: 1998: undrafted
- Playing career: 1993–2003
- Position: Small forward
- Number: 6, 34

Career history
- 1993–1994: Crvena zvezda
- 1998–2001: Zdravlje
- 2001–2002: NIS Vojvodina
- 2002–2003: Lavovi 063

Career highlights
- YUBA League champion (1994)

Milan Ćurčić (Serbian Cyrillic: Милан Ћурчић; born 19 July 1976) is a Serbian former professional basketball player.

== College career ==
For two seasons, between 1996 and 1998, Ćurčić played college basketball for the Kentucky-based Lindsey Wilson College of the NAIA Mid-South Conference.

== Playing career ==
Ćurčić had a stint with Crvena zvezda of the Yugoslav League in the 1993–94 season. In this season, he won a Yugoslav Championship playing together with Saša Obradović, Mileta Lisica, Aleksandar Trifunović, Dejan Tomašević and others.

Following his college career, Ćurčić returned to Yugoslavia. He played there for Zdravlje, NIS Vojvodina, and Lavovi 063. He retired as a player with Lavovi in 2003.
