= Strahinja Dragićević =

Serbian basketball player

Personal information
- Born: 28 January 1986 (age 40) Čačak, SR Serbia, SFR Yugoslavia
- Listed height: 2.01 m (6 ft 7 in)
- Listed weight: 110 kg (243 lb)

Career information
- Playing career: 2006–2017
- Position: Power forward
- Number: 15, 20

Career history
- 2006: Partizan
- 2007–2009: Mega Basket
- 2009: Walter Tigers Tübingen
- 2009–2011: Crvena zvezda
- 2011–2012: Keravnos
- 2012: Panionios
- 2013: Forex Time Apollon
- 2015: S.E.F.A. Arkadikos
- 2016: Pirot
- 2016–2017: Bosna Royal

Strahinja Dragićević (Serbian Cyrillic: Страхиња Драгићевић, born 28 January 1986) is a retired Serbian professional basketball player.

== Personal life ==
He is a twin brother of Tadija Dragićević who is also a basketball player.
