= Nikola Jovanović (basketball, born 1969) =

Serbian basketball player

Personal information
- Born: August 5, 1969 (age 57) Ljubić, SR Serbia, SFR Yugoslavia
- Listed height: 2.05 m (6 ft 8 1/2 in)
- Listed weight: 105 kg (231 lb)

Career information
- NBA draft: 1991: undrafted
- Playing career: 1988–2003
- Position: Power forward / center
- Number: 8, 15, 14

Career history
- 1988–1990: Železničar Čačak
- 1990–1992: Borac Čačak
- 1992–1994: Crvena zvezda
- 1994–1996: Mornar Bar
- 1996–1998: FMP Železnik
- 1998–1999: Hemofarm
- 1999–2000: Beobanka
- 2001–2002: Vastiau-Godeau Leuven
- 2002–2003: Yambol

Career highlights
- 2× YUBA League champion (1993, 1994); Yugoslav Cup winner (1997)

Nikola Jovanović (Serbian Cyrillic: Никола Јовановић; born August 5, 1969) is a Serbian former professional basketball player.

== Playing career ==
Jovanović played for the Borac Čačak, Crvena zvezda, Mornar Bar, FMP Železnik, Hemofarm and Beobanka of the Yugoslav League. In 1992–93 season, he won the Yugoslav League with Crvena zvezda and played together with Dragoljub Vidačić, Nebojša Ilić, Saša Obradović, Mileta Lisica, Predrag Stojaković, Rastko Cvetković, Aleksandar Trifunović and Dejan Tomašević. In his second season with the Zvezda he won his second national championship.

He also played for the Vastiau-Godeau Leuven of the Belgium Division I and the Yambol of the Bulgarian National League. During a sting with Yambol he played FIBA Europe Champions Cup in 2002–03 season. Over four tournament games, he averaged 13.1 points, 4.0 rebounds and 0.3 assists per game.

== Career achievements ==
- Yugoslav League champion: 2 (with Crvena zvezda: 1992–93, 1993–94)
- Yugoslav Cup winner: 1 (with FMP Železnik: 1996–97)
- Yugoslav Super Cup winner: 1 (with Crvena zvezda: 1993)
