= Legal status of Palestine =

Overview of the legal status of the State of Palestine

The Palestine Liberation Organization (PLO) declared the establishment of the State of Palestine on November 15, 1988. As of September 2025, the State of Palestine is recognized as a sovereign state by 157 of the 193 member states of the United Nations, or just over 80% of all UN members. It is a non-member observer state at the United Nations since November 2012. This limited status is largely due to the United States, a permanent member of the Security Council with veto power, which has consistently used its veto or threatened to do so to block Palestine’s full membership to UN. The existence of a state of Palestine is recognized by the states that have established bilateral diplomatic relations with it. There is a wide range of views on the legal status of the State of Palestine, both among international states and legal scholars.

== Statehood for the purposes of the UN Charter ==
Palestine Liberation Organization (PLO) had been recognized as "sole legitimate representative of the Palestinian people," competent on all matters concerning the question of Palestine by the UN General Assembly in addition to the right of the Palestinian people in Palestine to national independence and sovereignty, and was granted observer status at the UN General Assembly as a "non-state entity", from 1974. In mid-November 2011, the PLO submitted an official application to become a full member of the UN. A successful application would require approval from the UN Security Council and a two-thirds majority in the UN General Assembly. However, the Security Council's membership committee deadlocked on the issue and had been "unable to make a unanimous recommendation to the Security Council". The report was the result of seven weeks of meetings, detailing myriad disagreements between the council members on whether Palestine fulfills the requirements set forth in the U.N. charter for members countries. With their application for full membership stalled, the PLO sought an upgrade in status, from "observer entity" to "non-member observer state". In November 2012, UN General Assembly accepted the resolution upgrading Palestine to "non-member observer state" within the United Nations system, reasserting PLO as the representative of the Palestinian people.

The UN Charter protects the territorial integrity or political independence of any state from the threat or use of force. Philip Jessup served as a representative of the United States to the United Nations and as a Judge on the International Court of Justice. During the Security Council hearings regarding Israel's application for membership in the UN, he said:

"[W]e already have, among the members of the United Nations, some political entities which do not possess full sovereign power to form their own international policy, which traditionally has been considered characteristic of a State. We know however, that neither at San Francisco nor subsequently has the United Nations considered that complete freedom to frame and manage one's own foreign policy was an essential requisite of United Nations membership.... ...The reason for which I mention the qualification of this aspect of the traditional definition of a State is to underline the point that the term "State", as used and applied in Article 4 of the Charter of the United Nations, may not be wholly identical with the term "State" as it is used and defined in classic textbooks on international law."

In 2009, Riyad al-Maliki, the Palestinian Foreign Minister of the Palestinian National Authority, provided proof that Palestine had been extended legal recognition as a state by 67 other countries, and had bilateral agreements with states in Latin America, Asia, Africa and Europe.

== Declaration and Act of State Doctrine ==
Many states have recognized the State of Palestine since 1988. Under the principles of customary international law, when a government is recognized by another government, recognition is retroactive in effect, and validates all the actions and conduct of the government so recognized from the commencement of its existence.

Stephen Talmon notes that many countries have a formal policy of recognizing states, not their governments. In practice, they usually make no formal declarations regarding recognition. He cites several examples including a memorandum on US recognition policy and practice, dated 25 September 1981, which said that recognition would be implied by the US government's dealings with the new government. Many countries have expressed their intention to enter into relations with the State of Palestine. The US formally recognized the West Bank and Gaza Strip as "one area for political, economic, legal and other purposes" in 1997 at the request of the Palestinian Authority. At that time, it asked the public to take notice of that fact through announcements it placed in the Federal Register, the official journal of the US government. The USAID West Bank/Gaza, has been tasked with "state-building" projects in the areas of democracy, governance, resources, and infrastructure. Part of the USAID mission is to "provide flexible and discrete support for implementation of the Quartet Road Map", an internationally backed plan which calls for the progressive development of a viable Palestinian State in the West Bank and Gaza. The European Union (EU) has announced similar external relations programs with the Palestinian Authority.

The view of the European states, which did not extend full recognition was expressed by French President François Mitterrand who stated: "Many European countries are not ready to recognize a Palestine state. Others think that between recognition and non-recognition there are significant degrees; I am among these." But, after the PLO recognized the state of Israel, Mitterrand welcomed the PLO leader, Yasser Arafat, in Paris, in May 1989.

== Consequences of the occupation ==
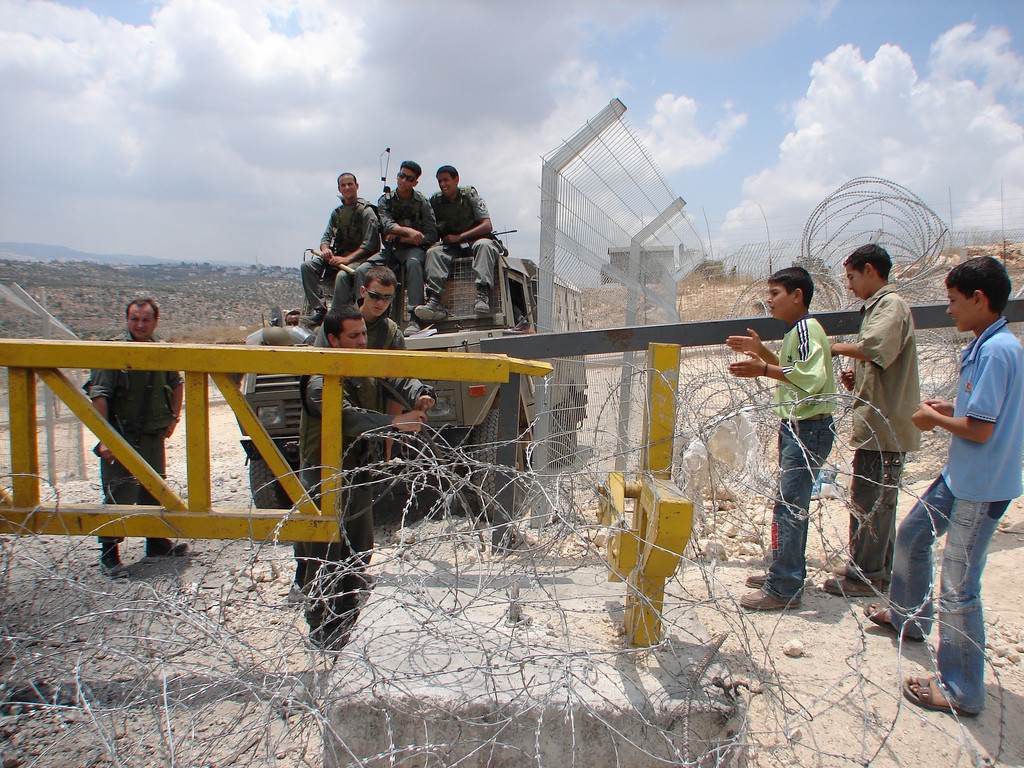
A barrier gate at Bil'in, West Bank, 2006

After 1967, a number of legal arguments were advanced which dismissed the right of Palestinians to self-determination and statehood. They generally proposed that Palestine was a land void of a legitimate sovereign and supported Israeli claims to the remaining territory of the Palestine Mandate. Historian and journalist Gershom Gorenberg says that outside of the pro-settlement community in Israel, these positions are considered quirky. He says that, while the Israeli government has used them for PR purposes abroad, it takes entirely different positions when arguing real legal cases before the Israeli Supreme Court. In 2005 Israel decided to dismantle all Israeli settlements in the Gaza Strip and four in the northern West Bank. Gorenberg notes, the government's decision was challenged in the Supreme Court by settlers, and the government won the case by noting the settlements were in territory whose legal status was that of 'belligerent territory'. The government argued that the settlers should have known the settlements were only temporary.

Most UN member states questioned the claim that Israel held better title to the land than the inhabitants, and stressed that statehood was an inalienable right of the Palestinian people. Legal experts, like David John Ball, concluded that "the Palestinians, based on the principles of self-determination and the power of the U.N., appear to hold better title to the territory." The International Court of Justice subsequently reaffirmed the right of the Palestinian people to self-determination and the prohibition under customary and conventional international law against acquisition of territory by war.

The Israeli Supreme Court, sitting as the High Court of Justice, cited a case involving the disengagement from Gaza and said that "The Judea and Samaria areas are held by the State of Israel in belligerent occupation. The long arm of the state in the area is the military commander. He is not the sovereign in the territory held in belligerent occupation. His power is granted him by public international law regarding belligerent occupation. The legal meaning of this view is twofold: first, Israeli law does not apply in these areas. They have not been "annexed" to Israel. Second, the legal regime which applies in these areas is determined by public international law regarding belligerent occupation."

The court said that most Israelis in Gaza did not own the land they built on there. "They acquired their rights from the military commander, or from persons acting on his behalf. Neither the military commander nor those acting on his behalf are owners of the property, and they cannot transfer rights better than those they have. To the extent that the Israelis built their homes and assets on land which is not private ('state land'), that land is not owned by the military commander. His authority is defined in regulation 55 of The Hague Regulations. [...] The State of Israel acts [...] as the administrator of the state property and as usufructuary of it."

== Decisions of international and national tribunals ==
The U.S. State Department Digest of International Law says that the terms of the Treaty of Lausanne provided for the application of the principles of state succession to the "A" Mandates. The Treaty of Versailles in 1920 provisionally recognized the former Ottoman communities as independent nations. It also required Germany to recognize the disposition of the former Ottoman territories and to recognize the new states laid down within their boundaries. The Treaty of Lausanne required the newly created states that acquired the territory to pay annuities on the Ottoman public debt, and to assume responsibility for the administration of concessions that had been granted by the Ottomans. A dispute regarding the status of the territories was settled by an Arbitrator appointed by the Council of the League of Nations. It was decided that Palestine and Transjordan were newly created states according to the terms of the applicable post-war treaties. In its Judgment No. 5, The Mavrommatis Palestine Concessions, the Permanent Court of International Justice also decided that Palestine was responsible as the successor state for concessions granted by Ottoman authorities. The Courts of Palestine and Great Britain decided that title to the properties shown on the Ottoman Civil list had been ceded to the government of Palestine as an allied successor state.

== State succession ==
A legal analysis by the International Court of Justice noted that the Covenant of the League of Nations had provisionally recognized the communities of Mandate Palestine as independent nations. The mandate simply marked a transitory period, with the aim and object of leading the mandated territory to become an independent self-governing State. The Court said that specific guarantees regarding freedom of movement and access to the Holy Sites contained in the Treaty of Berlin (1878) had been preserved under the terms of the Palestine Mandate and a chapter of the United Nations Partition Plan for Palestine. In a separate opinion, Judge Higgins argued that since United Nations Security Council Resolution 242 in 1967 to resolution 1515 in 2003, the "key underlying requirements" have been that "Israel is entitled to exist, to be recognized, and to security, and that the Palestinian people are entitled to their territory, to exercise self-determination, and to have their own State", with resolution 1515 endorsing the road map for peace proposed by the Middle East Quartet, as a means to achieve these obligations through negotiation.

Article 62 (LXII) of the Treaty of Berlin, 13 July 1878 dealt with religious freedom and civil and political rights in all parts of the Ottoman Empire. The guarantees have frequently been referred to as "religious rights" or "minority rights". However, the guarantees included a prohibition against discrimination in civil and political matters. Difference of religion could not be alleged against any person as a ground for exclusion or incapacity in matters relating to the enjoyment of civil or political rights, admission to public employments, functions, and honors, or the exercise of the various professions and industries, "in any locality whatsoever."

The resolution of the San Remo Conference contained a safeguarding clause for all of those rights. The conference accepted the terms of the Mandate with reference to Palestine, on the understanding that there was inserted in the process-verbal a legal undertaking by the Mandatory Power that it would not involve the surrender of the rights hitherto enjoyed by the non-Jewish communities in Palestine. The draft mandates for Mesopotamia and Palestine, and all of the post-war peace treaties contained clauses for the protection of minorities. The mandates invoked the compulsory jurisdiction of the Permanent Court of International Justice in the event of any disputes.

Article 28 of the Mandate required that those rights be safeguarded in perpetuity, under international guarantee. The General Assembly's Plan for the Future Government of Palestine placed those rights under UN protection as part of a minority protection plan. It required that they be acknowledged in a Declaration, embodied in the fundamental laws of the states, and in their Constitutions. The partition plan also contained provisions that bound the new states to international agreements and conventions to which Palestine had become a party and held them responsible for its financial obligations. The Declarations of the Independent State of Israel and the Independent State of Palestine acknowledged the protected rights and were accepted as being in line with UN resolution 181(II).

== Opinions of officials and legal scholars ==
Jacob Robinson was a legal advisor to the United Nations delegation of the Jewish Agency for Palestine during the special session of the General Assembly in 1947. He advised the Zionist Executive that the provisional states had come into existence as a result of the resolution of 29 November 1947.

L.C. Green explained that "recognition of statehood is a matter of discretion, it is open to any existing state to accept as a state any entity it wishes, regardless of the existence of territory or an established government."

Alex Takkenberg writes that while "there is no doubt that the entity 'Palestine' should be considered a state in statu nascendi and although it is increasingly likely that the ongoing peace process will eventually culminate in the establishment of a Palestinian state, it is premature to conclude that statehood, as defined by international law, is at present (spring 1997) firmly established." Referring to the four criteria of statehood, as outlined in the 1933 Montevideo Convention – that is, a permanent population, a defined territory, government and the capacity to enter into relations with other states – Takkenberg states that the entity known as Palestine does not fully satisfy these criteria.

Conversely John V. Whitbeck, who served as an advisor to the Palestinian negotiation team during negotiations with Israel, writes that "the State of Palestine already exists," and that when, "Judged by these customary criteria [those of the Montevideo Convention], the State of Palestine is on at least as firm a legal footing as the State of Israel." He continues: "The weak link in Palestine's claim to already exist as a state was, until recently, the fourth criterion, "effective control... Yet a Palestinian executive and legislature, democratically elected with the enthusiastic approval of the international community, now exercises 'effective control' over a portion of Palestinian territory in which the great majority of the state's population lives. It can no longer be seriously argued that Palestine's claim to exist falls at the fourth and final hurdle."

For John Quigley, Palestine's existence as a state predates the 1988 declaration. Tracing Palestine's status as an international entity back to the collapse of the Ottoman Empire after World War I, he recalls that the Palestine Mandate, an arrangement made under Article 22 of the Covenant of the League of Nations, held as its "ultimate objective", the "self-determination and independence of the people concerned." He says that in explicitly referring to the Covenant, the 1988 declaration was reaffirming an existing Palestinian statehood. Noting that Palestine under the Mandate entered into bilateral treaties, including one with Great Britain, the Mandatory power, he cites this as an example of its "sovereignty" at that time. He also notes the corollary of the Stimson Doctrine and the customary prohibition on the use of force contained in the Restatement of Foreign Relations Law of the United States, "[a]n entity does not necessarily cease to be a state even if all of its territory has been occupied by a foreign power".

Robert Weston Ash says that Quigley's analysis of the declaration that the Palestinian Authority provided to the International Criminal Court failed to explain a number of key issues. He says the "Palestinian people" to whom sovereignty reverted upon the departure of the British would have included both Jews and Arabs. He suggests that establishes a colorable Jewish —as well as Arab — claim to all of Palestine which tends to refute Professor Quigley's contention that there are no other claimants to that territory. Ash says there are segments of Israeli society that continue to view "Judea and Samaria" as areas promised to the Jews by the Balfour Declaration and says that the Geneva Convention is not applicable to Israel's presence in those territories. He cites Yehuda Blum's "Missing Reversioner" and Eugene Rostow's related claim that "The right of the Jewish people to settle in Palestine has never been terminated for the West Bank." He also notes that 'the terms of the Interim Agreement prohibit both Israel and the PA from “initiat[ing] or tak[ing] any step that will change the status of the West Bank and the Gaza Strip'.

Quigley has said that the International Court of Justice findings in the "Wall" case regarding the applicability of the Geneva Convention discredited once and for all, as a legal matter, the "missing reversioner" argument. The International Criminal Court has published a summary of arguments which says that some submissions consider that it is clear that the Palestinian National Authority cannot be regarded as a "State", and that some submit that Palestine is recognized as a State by many States and many institutions. The Court says that a conclusive determination on Palestine's declaration will have to be made by the judges at an appropriate moment.

Such experts as Daniel Benoliel, Ronen Perry and Nicholas Stephanopoulos, Dore Gold, Malcolm Shaw also consider Palestinian declaration of independence as a violation of the Oslo Accords.

Disputes have arisen as a result of the Conflict of laws between the Palestinian Authority and Israel. Judgments originating in Israeli Courts are not directly enforceable in the Courts of the Palestinian Authority. The District Court of Israel ruled that the Palestinian Authority satisfied the criteria to be legally treated as a sovereign state The ruling was appealed to the Supreme Court of Israel which ruled that the Palestinian Authority cannot be defined as a foreign state, since recognizing states is an exclusive authority of the Ministry of Foreign Affairs. The Supreme Court held that the Palestinian Authority can be granted state immunity on an ad hoc basis when it is warranted by the circumstances. The Knesset responded to the willingness of the judges to engage in examination of the notion of 'statehood for the purpose of state immunity' by adopting a measure that makes it possible to grant sovereign immunity to a 'political entity that is not a state' as part of the 2008 Foreign States Immunity Law, Art. 20.

Stefan Talmon notes that "In international law it is true that one generally recognizes the Government which exercises effective control over a territory. But this is not an absolute rule without exceptions." James Crawford notes that despite its prevalence, and inclusion in the statehood criteria found in the Montevideo Convention, effectiveness is not the sole or even the critical criterion for statehood. He cites several examples of annexations and governments that have been recognized despite their lack of a territorial foothold. Israeli Prime Minister Netanyahu recently expressed a willingness to recognize the State of Palestine if it will agree to forgo taking effective control of its airspace, military defense, and not enter into alliances with Israel's enemies.

In November 2009, Palestinian officials were reported to be preparing the ground for asking for recognition of a Palestinian State from the Security Council. The state was envisioned to be based on the 1967 Green Line as an international border with Israel and East Jerusalem as its capital. The plan was reported to have support from Arab states, Russia and the UN Secretary General, Ban Ki-moon. The Secretary General said "Today, the State of Israel exists, but the State of Palestine does not." "It is vital that a sovereign State of Palestine is achieved". "This should be on the basis of the 1967 lines with agreed land swaps and a just and agreed solution to the refugee issue." On 29 January 2010, the representative of Palestine deposited a copy of a letter submitted by Prime Minister Fayyad with the UN Secretary-General. The letter reported on the decree issued by Mahmoud Abbas, "President of the State of Palestine", concerning the formation of an independent commission to follow up on the Goldstone report in compliance with General Assembly resolution 64/10 of 5 November 2009.

Paul De Waart says that the Quartet, particularly the United States, as well as western states, do not consider Palestine to be a state as yet. In their view the statehood of Palestine will be the result of bilateral negotiations between Israel and the Palestinian people. He says they have overlooked that under international law it is not anymore a question of creating but of recognizing the State of Palestine.

Israeli legal expert Ruth Lapidoth said the Palestinians have already unilaterally declared statehood, and they did not need to do it again. "Recognition of statehood is a political act, and every state has the right to decide for itself whether to recognize another state."

President Abbas said that the State of Palestine was already in existence and that the current battle is to have the state's border recognized.

Jerome Segal wrote about Salam Fayyad's plan for Palestinian statehood. He said lest anyone believe that the 1988 declaration is ancient history, they should read the new Fayyad plan with more care. It cites the 1988 declaration four times, identifying it as having articulated "the foundations of the Palestinian state."

In September 2010, the World Bank released a report which found the Palestinian Authority "well-positioned to establish a state" at any point in the near future. The report highlighted, however, that unless private-sector growth in the Palestinian economy was stimulated, a Palestinian state would remain donor dependent.

In April 2011, the UN's co-ordinator for the Middle East peace process issued a report lauding the Palestinian Authority, describing "aspects of its administration as sufficient for an independent state." It echoed similar assessments published the week prior by the International Monetary Fund and the World Bank.

== See also ==
- Legitimacy of Israel
- Right to exist
- Self-determination
- Status of Jerusalem
- Status of territories occupied by Israel in 1967
- Territorial integrity
