= Saša Stefanović =

Serbian basketball player

Personal information
- Born: 17 September 1975 (age 51) Belgrade, SFR Yugoslavia
- Listed height: 1.88 m (6 ft 2 in)
- Listed weight: 89 kg (196 lb)

Career information
- NBA draft: 1997: undrafted
- Playing career: 1993–2012
- Position: Point guard
- Number: 4, 5, 7, 10

Career history
- 1993–1994: Profikolor
- Beopetrol
- Zemun
- 1998–1999: Zvezda Ruma
- 1999–2000: Radnički Jugopetrol
- 2000: NIS Vojvodina
- 2000–2001: Crvena zvezda
- 2001–2002: BSG Ludwigsburg
- 2002–2003: Sloga
- 2003: Crvena zvezda
- 2003–2004: FMP (Reflex)
- 2004–2005: Türk Telekom
- 2005–2006: Iraklis
- 2006: Bilbao
- 2006–2007: Igokea
- 2007: Stal Ostrów Wielkopolski
- 2007: Limoges CSP
- Keravnos
- 2008–2009: Sloga
- 2009: Towzin Electric Kashan
- 2010: FMP
- 2010–2011: Brotnjo
- 2011–2012: Ulcinj

Saša Stefanović (Serbian Cyrillic: Саша Стефановић; born 17 September 1975) is a Serbian former professional basketball player.

== Professional career ==
A point guard, Stefanović played for Profikolor, Beopetrol, Zemun, KK Zvezda Ruma, Radnički Jugopetrol, NIS Vojvodina, Crvena zvezda, BSG Ludwigsburg, Sloga, FMP, Türk Telekom, Iraklis, Bilbao, Igokea, Stal Ostrów Wielkopolski, Limoges CSP, Towzin Electric Kashan, Brotnjo, and Ulcinj.

On 6 January 2001, Stefanović was at the center of an altercation among players during a game in Antwerp, Belgium, between Stefanović's Zvezda and the home team Telindus Racing Antwerpen at the Top 16 game of the 2000–01 FIBA Saporta Cup. The brawl involved Stefanović and his teammates and Antwerpen's Stefan Sappenberghs and his teammates.

== Career achievements ==
- ABA League champion: 1 (with FMP (Reflex): 2003–04)

== Sources ==
- Saša Stefanović: Mediteran je moj izbor
