= Vladimir Cvetić =

Serbian basketball player

Personal information
- Born: 6 January 1981 (age 45) Belgrade, SR Serbia, SFR Yugoslavia
- Listed height: 1.93 m (6 ft 4 in)

Career information
- NBA draft: 2003: undrafted
- Playing career: 2000–2008
- Position: Guard
- Number: 5, 7, 14

Career history
- 2000–2001: Crvena zvezda
- Mega Ishrana
- 2007–2008: OKK Beograd

Vladimir Cvetić (Serbian Cyrillic: Владимир Цветић; born 6 January 1981) is a Serbian former professional basketball player.

== Playing career ==
A guard, Cvetić played for Belgrade-based clubs Crvena zvezda, Mega Ishrana, and OKK Beograd. On 10 February 2000, Cvetić made his EuroLeague debut with Crvena zvezda in a 96–71 lost to Real Madrid Teka recording one steal in 2 minutes of playing time.
