= Nebojša Mihailović =

Serbian lawyer and basketball player

- Небојша Михаиловић
- Born: 13 April 1961 (age 65); Belgrade, PR Serbia, Yugoslavia
- Education: First Belgrade Gymnasium
- Alma mater: University of Belgrade
- Occupations: Lawyer; basketball player
- Years active: 1988–present (legal)
- Basketball career

Career information
- NBA draft: 1983: undrafted
- Playing career: 1979–1991
- Number: 10

Career history
- 1979–1980: Crvena zvezda
- 1980–1982: Mladost Zemun
- 1982–1988: OKK Beograd
- 1988–1991: Poštar Beograd

Nebojša Mihailović (Serbian Cyrillic: Небојша Михаиловић; born 13 April 1961) is a Serbian lawyer and former professional basketball player.

== Basketball career ==
=== Playing career ===
Mihailović grew up with the Crvena zvezda youth system, playing under coaches Mile Protić and Božidar Maljković.

As a professional player, Mihailović spent his entire professional career in Yugoslavia, playing for Crvena zvezda, Mladost Zemun, and OKK Beograd. He retired as a professional player with OKK Beograd in 1988 to start his legal career.

=== Post-playing career ===
After retirement of professional career in 1988, Mihailović joined an amateur team KK Poštar.

Since June 2011, Mihailović has been a member of the Commission for Competitions at the Basketball Federation of Serbia, in charge for players' transfers and registrations.

== Legal career ==
Mihailović earned his law degree from the University of Belgrade Faculty of Law in 1985. In 1988, he pas the bar exam. At the same time he opened his own law firm and started his legal career as an attorney.
