= HAKK Mladost =

Croatian basketball club

- League: A-2 League
- Founded: 1946
- Arena: Dom košarke
- Location: Zagreb, Croatia
- Team colors: Red, white, yellow
- Main sponsor: Cedevita
- President: Mladen Perica
Home	Away

HAKK Mladost (Hrvatski akademski košarkaški klub Mladost) is a Croatian basketball club from Zagreb. It is part of the Mladost sports society.

== History ==
The basketball section of the club was formed in 1946 after its parent club HAŠK Zagreb (which established in 1906 and until 1945 had only football department) fused up to Dinamo Zagreb. However, for HAŠK not to dissolve it founded other departments and renamed it to Mladost (HAŠK Mladost), which in English means "Youth".

In 1948, Mladost participated for the first time in the final tournament of the Yugoslav League held in Belgrade and took the fifth place in a six team group. The next year, it came out as best Croatian basketball team after it was ranked third in the national league behind their Serbian rivals of Belgrade (Crvena Zvezda & Partizan) and above the other Croatian teams such as Jedinstvo (4th) and Lokomotiva Rijeka (9th). The decade of the '50s proved the best in the history of the club, having taken part seven times in the large category of Yugoslavia basketball (1950, 1951, 1952, 1954, 1955, 1956) and specifically in 1954 where Mladost (Brkljačić, Aleksandar Blašković, Petar Mijač, Batalo, Špiljak, coach Mića Orlović) claims until of the end the champions title against this great team of Crvena Zvezda with the consecutive championship wins that period. The absolute zenith of the championship's claims, Mladost was limited to simple participation the next two years and was demoted in 1956. The last glimpse of the team was in 1962, with its participation in the great division, accompanied by an even longer and definitive relegation.

== Yugoslav League seasons ==
Yugoslav League seasons
Season	League
1948	Yugoslav League; 5th place
1949	Yugoslav League; 3rd place
1950	Yugoslav League; 5th place
1951	Yugoslav League; 3rd place
1952	Yugoslav League; 4th place
1954	Yugoslav League; 2nd place
1955	Yugoslav League; 8th place
1956	Yugoslav League; 9th place
1962	Yugoslav League; 10th place

== Notable players ==
- (Socialist Federal Republic of Yugoslavia) (Croatia) Faruk Kulenović (1969–73)
- (Socialist Federal Republic of Yugoslavia) (Croatia) Mihovil Nakić (1970–73)
