= Dimitrije Krstić =

Serbian basketball player and coach

Career history

Playing
- 1950–1951: Crvena zvezda

Coaching
- 1962–1964: Crvena zvezda Ladies

Dimitrije Krstić (Serbian Cyrillic: Димитрије Крстић) was a Serbian basketball player and coach.

Krstić was a member of the first managing board of the Crvena zvezda basketball club.

== Playing career ==
Godžić played for a Belgrade-based team Crvena zvezda of the Yugoslav First League. During his stint with Crvena zvezda he won two Yugoslav Championships.

== Career achievements and awards ==
As player

- Yugoslav League champion: 2 (with Crvena zvezda: 1950, 1951)

As coach

- Yugoslav Women's League champion: 1 (with Crvena zvezda Ladies: 1963)
