= Borislav Ćurčić =

Yugoslav basketball player and coach

Personal information
- Born: 27 January 1932 Podum, Sava Banovina, Kingdom of Yugoslavia
- Died: 15 April 2015 (aged 83) Belgrade, Serbia
- Listed height: 1.83 m (6 ft 0 in)

Career information
- NBA draft: 1954: undrafted
- Playing career: 1950–1965
- Number: 14
- Coaching career: 1965–1967

Career history

Playing
- 1950–1955: Crvena zvezda
- 1956–1957: Pallacanestro Cantù
- 1958–1965: Partizan

Coaching
- 1965–1967: Partizan

Borislav Ćurčić (Serbian Cyrillic: Борислав Ћурчић; January 27, 1932 – April 15, 2015) was a Serbian basketball player and coach. He represented the Yugoslavia national basketball team internationally.

== Early life ==
Born in the village of Podum near Otočac (nowadays in Croatia), in addition to basketball, Ćurčić also pursued skiing.

== Playing career ==
Ćurčić played for two Belgrade teams Crvena zvezda and Partizan in the Yugoslav First League, as well as for Pallacanestro Cantù in Italy for two seasons. During the time with Crvena zvezda he won 6 Yugoslav Championships.

In July 1950, he was a member of the Zvezda squad that won an international cup tournament in Milan, Italy.

== National team career ==
Ćurčić was a member of the Yugoslavia national basketball team that participated at the 1953 European Championship in Moscow, the Soviet Union. Over ten tournament games, he averaged 11.0 points per game while shooting 80.4 percent from the field. He was the team-leading scorer and had three games with 20 and more points scored. Ćurčić was a member of the national team at the 1954 FIBA World Championship in Rio de Janeiro, Brazil. Over five tournament games, he averaged 11.4 points per game while shooting 77.1 percent from the field. Ćurčić was a member of the national team at the 1955 European Championship in Budapest, Hungary. Over eleven tournament games, he averaged 11.2 points per game while shooting 72.8 percent from the field. He was the team-leading scorer and had two games with 20 and more points scored. On June 19, 1955, he scored a career-high 26 points in a 66–69 loss to Italy.

== Coaching career ==
Ćurčić coached Partizan Belgrade for three seasons in the Yugoslav First League.

== Career achievements and awards ==
=== Player ===
- Yugoslav League champion: 6 (with Crvena zvezda: 1950, 1951, 1952, 1953, 1954, 1955).

== See also ==
- List of KK Partizan head coaches
- Milan Bjegojević
- List of Yugoslav First Federal Basketball League annual scoring leaders
