= Mirko Aksentijević =

Serbian journalist and basketball executive

- Мирко Аксентијевић
- Born: 13 August 1922; Kuršumlija, Kingdom of Serbs, Croats and Slovenes
- Died: 15 March 2011 (aged 88); Belgrade, Serbia
- Other names: Bata
- Occupations: foreign policy journalist; basketball executive; writer

Mirko "Bata" Aksentijević (Serbian Cyrillic: Мирко Аксентијевић; 13 August 1922 – 15 March 2011) was a Serbian journalist and basketball executive. He was the first president of KK Crvena zvezda.

== Journalism career ==
Aksentijević graduated from the journalistic and diplomatic school and has been engaged in journalism since 1948. From the beginning of his journalistic career he worked in the Tanjug Agency, firstly in the domestic politic department, and since 1950 in the foreign policy section.

Aksentijević was reporting from Greece, Republic of the Congo and Lebanon. He was an outstanding connoisseur not only for the Palestinian problem but also and the Kurdish issue. During his journalistic career, he met with numerous foreign politicians, intellectuals, cultural and sports figures he interviewed and whose work he wrote.

At the beginning of the 1960s, Aksentijević was the eyewitness of the end of the Congolese Prime Minister Patrice Lumumba. His report from Congo in 1960, about the overthrow of Prime Minister Lumumba, was the first which spread the news around the world. Aksentijević was the last journalist, and perhaps the last man who talked with Lumumba before he was executed on 17 January 1961.

Aksentijević was the first foreign journalist to meet with Palestinian leader Yasser Arafat in Palestinian bases in Jordan in 1968. Since then, he reported about the struggle of the Palestinian people for freedom from close proximity. He reported about the largest Arab-Israeli war in 1973. Although he was seriously wounded on the Syrmian Front in 1945, he always tried to be on the front line when he reported on the Middle East conflicts. He is the first Yugoslav journalist who met with Mustafa Barzani, a famous Kurdish leader and president of the Kurdistan Democratic Party.

Aksentijević organized and led the International Press Center in Belgrade from 1977 to 1982. In 1982, he became director of the Yugoslav Cultural Information Center in Vienna, Austria. This job was a special challenge in his career because he made it possible for him to become acquainted with the life of Serbian diaspora in Austria, as well as to promote Yugoslav culture in this country.

== Crvena zvezda ==
Aksentijević was a co-founder of the Belgrade-based powerhouse Red Star Sports Association in 1945. Due to wounding during World War II, Aksentijević was not able to play basketball so he completely devoted himself to the club's work organization. Aksentijević was the first president of the Crvena zvezda basketball club. Shortly thereafter, future FIBA Hall of Famer Nebojša Popović joined the club as a player-coach. In 1950, Aksentijević steps down as the club president. During his tenure, the Zvezda won five Yugoslav Basketball Championship.

== Bibliography ==
- Neprijatelji
- Palestinski dosije (1979)
- Naoruz dolazi (1996)
- Globalno, a nije svetsko (2005)
