= Strahinja Alagić =

Serbian basketball player and coach

Personal information
- Born: 14 August 1924 Kozarac, Kingdom of Serbs, Croats and Slovenes
- Died: 10 October 2002 (aged 78) Belgrade, Serbia, FR Yugoslavia

Career information
- Playing career: 1945–1952
- Number: 3, 9
- Coaching career: 1947–1985

Career history

Playing
- 1945: Yugoslav Army
- 1946: Partizan
- 1947–1952: Crvena zvezda

Coaching
- 1947–1951: Crvena zvezda Women (youth)
- 1952: OKK Beograd (assistant)
- 1953: OKK Beograd
- 1954: Yugoslavia Women
- 1957–1960: Crvena zvezda Women
- 1968: Yugoslavia Women
- 1974–1981: Crvena zvezda Women
- 1976: Crvena zvezda Men
- Radnički Kragujevac Women
- Sloboda Women
- Radnički Kragujevac Men

Career highlights
- As player: 6× Yugoslav League champion (1945, 1947–1951); As coach: 10× Yugoslav Women's League champion (1958–1960, 1973, 1976–1981); Women's European Champions Cup winner (1979); 4× Yugoslav Women's Cup winner (1974, 1976, 1979, 1981); Ivković Award for Lifetime Achievement (2003)
Medals
Women's basketball
Head coach of Yugoslavia
EuroBasket Women
Silver medal – second place	1968 Italy	Team

Strahinja "Braca" Alagić (Serbian Cyrillic: Страхиња "Браца" Алагић; 14 August 1924 – 10 October 2002) was a Serbian professional basketball player and coach. He dedicated his coaching career is the most to women's basketball. With Crvena zvezda he won the FIBA EuroLeague Women in 1979.

Alagić was a member of the first managing board of the Crvena zvezda basketball club.

== Playing career ==
Alagić started playing basketball after the end of World War II as a member of the Yugoslav Army basketball team. The first Yugoslav national championship held in Subotica in 1945 where his team won the title by beating the Serbia selection in the finals. Next year he moved to newly formed basketball club Partizan together with seven teammates such as Aleksandar Nikolić and Mirko Marjanović.

After spending a year in Partizan, Alagic moved to Crvena zvezda where he played the longest and where he achieved major successes. In the period from 1947 to 1951 he won five national championships with Nebojša Popović, Srđan Kalember and others. In July 1950, he won an international cup tournament with the Zvezda in Milan, Italy.

== Coaching career ==
After ending his playing career, Alagić devoted himself to coaching. First of all Alagić worked as a coach of women's team, although he briefly coached the Crvena zvezda men's team. With women's team of Crvena zvezda he had a lot of success, especially in national competitions. The most important club's success in the history of women's basketball is winning the European Cup in 1979 with Crvena zvezda.

Alagić had a big success with the Yugoslavia women's national team, which in 1968 led to the first medal in Eurobasket.

== Career achievements ==
=== Player ===
- Yugoslav League champion: 6 (with Yugoslav Army: 1945 and with Crvena zvezda: 1947, 1948, 1949, 1950, 1951).

=== Coach ===
- Yugoslav Women's League champion: 10 (with Crvena zvezda: 1958, 1959, 1960, 1972–73, 1975–76, 1976–77, 1977–78, 1978–79, 1979–80, 1980–81)
- Yugoslav Women's Cup winner: 4 (with Crvena zvezda: 1973–74, 1975–76, 1978–79, 1980–81)
- FIBA Women's European Champions Cup winner: 1 (with Crvena zvezda: 1978–79).

== See also ==
- List of EuroLeague Women winning coaches
- List of Red Star Belgrade basketball coaches
