= ŽKK Ljubljana =

Železničar Ljubljana
- Leagues: Yugoslav First League (1949–1960)
- Founded: 1943; 82 years ago
- Location: Ljubljana, Slovenia
- Team colors: Blue, white
- Championships: 1 Yugoslav Cup
Home	Away

Železničarski košarkarski klub Ljubljana, also known as Železničar Ljubljana, was a basketball team based in Ljubljana, Slovenia. The team competed in the Yugoslav First Federal Basketball League from 1949 until 1960. They also won the Yugoslav Cup in 1959.

== Rosters ==
1959 Yugoslav Cup
Čretnik, Kumer, Potočnik, Jože Zupančič, Škerjanc, Elselt, Senčar, Zajc, Urbanija, Vranič, Perhaj
Head coach: Kruno Brumen

== Honours ==
- Slovenian Championship

Winners: 1948

- Yugoslav Cup

Winners: 1959
