= Ladislav Demšar =

Yugoslavian basketball player and coach

Personal information
- Born: 25 January 1929 Novi Sad, Kingdom of Serbs, Croats and Slovenes
- Died: 15 May 1992 (aged 63) Novi Sad, FR Yugoslavia
- Listed height: 1.87 m (6 ft 2 in)

Career information
- NBA draft: 1951: undrafted
- Playing career: 1946–1960
- Position: Center
- Number: 7
- Coaching career: 1961–1986

Career history

Playing
- 1946–1947: Egység
- 1948–1960: Crvena zvezda

Coaching
- 1961–1964: Vojvodina Men
- 1964–1972: Vojvodina Women
- 1966–1967 1970: Yugoslavia Women
- 1972–1973: Geas Basket
- 1980–1984: Vojvodina Women

Career highlights
- As player: 7× Yugoslav League champion (1948–1952, 1954, 1955); Yugoslav League scoring champion (1946); As coach: 2× Yugoslav Women's League champion (1969, 1970)
Medals
Women's basketball
Head Coach for Yugoslavia
EuroBasket Women
Bronze medal – third place	1970 Rotterdam	Team

Ladislav Demšar (Serbian Cyrillic: Ладислав Демшар; March 3, 1928 – May 15, 1992) was a Yugoslav basketball player and coach. He represented the Yugoslavia national basketball team internationally.

== Playing career ==
Demšar played for Egység from Novi Sad and Crvena zvezda from Belgrade. He missed entire 1953 season.

In July 1950, he was a member of the Zvezda squad that won an international cup tournament in Milan, Italy.

== National team career ==
As a player for the Yugoslavia national basketball team Demšar participated in 1950 World Championship and three European Championships, 1947 in Prague, 1953 in Moscow and 1955 in Budapest. He played 79 games for national team. During EuroBasket 1947, on 13 May 1947 he score 42 points on 90–13 win against Albania national team and set national team scoring record.

== Coaching career ==
Demšar coached Vojvodina women's team from Novi Sad. Also, he coached Yugoslavia women's national team and won bronze medal at 1970 European Women's Championship in Rotterdam.

== Personal life ==
Demšar's wife was Marija Veger (born 1947), a former basketball player who played for Vojvodina and the Yugoslavia national team

== Career achievements and awards ==
Player

- Yugoslav Men's League champion: 7 (with Crvena zvezda: 1948, 1949, 1950, 1951, 1952, 1954, 1955).

Coach

- Yugoslav Women's League champion: 2 (with Vojvodina: 1969, 1970)

== See also ==
- List of KK Crvena zvezda players with 100 games played
- List of Yugoslav First Federal Basketball League annual scoring leaders
