= Milan Bjegojević =

Yugoslav basketball player and coach

Personal information
- Born: 9 August 1928 Prnjavor, Kingdom of Serbs, Croats and Slovenes
- Died: 2 October 2003 (aged 75) Belgrade, Serbia and Montenegro
- Listed height: 1.81 m (5 ft 11 in)

Career information
- Playing career: 1947–1955
- Position: Guard
- Number: 5
- Coaching career: 1952–1970

Career history

Playing
- 1947–1955: Crvena zvezda

Coaching
- Crvena zvezda Juniors
- 1959–1970: Crvena zvezda

Career highlights
- As a player: 9× Yugoslav League champion (1947–1955); As a coach: Yugoslav League champion (1969)

Milan "Musa" Bjegojević (Serbian Cyrillic: Милан "Муса" Bjegojević; August 9, 1928 – October 2, 2003) was a Serbian basketball player and coach. He represented the Yugoslavia national basketball team internationally.

Best known for many years of playing at Crvena Zvezda. In the red-and-whites was from 1947 to 1955, played 113 competitive games and scored 786 points. In all nine seasons with the Red Star became nine consecutive times champion of Yugoslavia. The effect of nine titles as a basketball club during the past decades addition Bjegojević has only Srđan Kalember and two of them hold a club record of nine titles Champion which will hardly ever be upset.

== Playing career ==
=== Crvena zvezda ===
Bjegojević in his first three seasons in the Crvena Zvezda was not so much time in the foreground, he had a notable impact in winning the 1950 title, when in 16 games he scored 71 points and to 1951, when in 20 matches he scored 100 points. He offered great games in the last three seasons at Red Star jersey. In the 1953 championship and on 11 matches he scored 191 points and during that time had a very high average of 17.4 points per game because he was the first shooter of the Zvezda, and of that number in the final championship tournament by 106 points and was the best scorer of the tournament final. In the convincing win against Partizan (82:56) he scored even 32 points, and the final tournament in triumph against KFA from Ljubljana (83–55) scored 23 points against Partizan (70:59) stopped at 19 points. The following season he was second leader team behind Borislav Ćurčić. In 15 games he scored a total of 187 points (12.5 per game). The convincing win against the Workers (100: 65) recorded 20 points, the Star won another title in the series. In the 1955 championship at the meeting of 14 he enrolled 163 points (11.6 per game), Zvezda won 10 consecutive title, a Bjegojević its ninth. Against Maribor (106: 51) scored 23 points. According to the newspaper Politika of Belgrade in 1955, during those first 10 years in the club Milan Bjegojević was the second leading scorer counting all matches (rounds, friendly, magazines and the tournament) with 3041 points. More from him in the first 10 flight between players in red and white had only Borislav Ćurčić (4986). The popular "Musa" in this period he played 360 matches, making it the third in the first decade of the Red Star. In front of him were only Đorđe Andrijašević with 377 and Borislav Ćurčić with 380 matches.

== National team career ==
Bjegojević played with the Yugoslav national team in three major competitions. At the 1953 European Championship in Moscow where in nine games scored 34 points, and the team took the sixth place. It was a time when the Yugoslav basketball rules groundwork for later great success. Bjegojević at the 1954 FIBA World Championship in Rio de Janeiro, in five matches scored 46 points with an average of 9.2 points was the third scorer of the national team, which finished the competition in 11th place. In the only win of the tournament against Peru (86–84) recorded 20 points and free throws without a miss a shot (8-8). At the 1955 European Championship in Budapest, Yugoslavia was eighth, and Milan in nine games scored 49 points. In the triumph over Austria (68:61) he achieved a performance of 19 points.

== Coaching career ==
Four year after his retirements as basketball player he became coach of the Red Star. He led the club for 11 seasons, from 1959-60 to 1969-70 and won the championship in 1969 with the second great generation of Zvezda in which they played stars like Vladimir Cvetković, Dragan Kapičić, Ljubodrag Simonović, Dragiša Vučinić, Miroslav Todosijević, Tihomir Pavlović and of course Moka Slavnić. As coach of Crvena Zvezda had more seasons from him only his old friend Nebojša Popović (12 seasons, from 1946 to 1957).

== Career achievements ==
As player:

- Yugoslav League: 9 (with Crvena Zvezda: 1947, 1948, 1949, 1950, 1951, 1952, 1953, 1954, 1955)

As coach

- Yugoslav League: 1 (with Crvena Zvezda: 1968-69)

== Personal life ==
Bjegojević married Gordana Baraga, a basketball player herself with ŽKK Crvena zvezda and the Yugoslavia women's national basketball team.

== See also ==
- List of KK Crvena zvezda players with 100 games played
- List of Red Star Belgrade basketball coaches
- List of Yugoslav First Federal Basketball League annual scoring leaders
