= Milorad Sokolović =

Yugoslav basketball player and coach

Personal information
- Born: 10 August 1922 Belgrade, Kingdom of Serbs, Croats, and Slovenes
- Died: 26 June 1999 (aged 76) Belgrade, FR Yugoslavia
- Listed height: 1.90 m (6 ft 3 in)

Career information
- Playing career: 1946–1952
- Position: Center
- Number: 11
- Coaching career: 1952–1958

Career history

Playing
- 1942: Obilić
- 1946: Metalac
- 1947–1952: Crvena zvezda

Coaching
- 1952–1957: Crvena zvezda Ladies
- 1958: Yugoslavia Women

Career highlights
- As player: 6× Yugoslav League champion (1947–1952); As coach: 5× Yugoslav Women's League champion (1953–1957)

Milorad Sokolović (Serbian Cyrillic: Милорад Соколовић; 10 August 1922 – 26 June 1999), also known by his nickname Soko (Serbian Cyrillic: Соко; in English Falcon), was a Serbian basketball player, coach and sports journalist. He represented the Yugoslavia national basketball team internationally.

== Basketball career ==
=== Playing career ===
Sokolović played for Belgrade-based teams Metalac and Crvena zvezda of the Yugoslav First League. He won six National Championships with the Zvezda. In July 1950, he was a member of the Zvezda squad that won an international cup tournament in Milan, Italy.

Sokolović was a member of the Yugoslavia national basketball team at the 1950 FIBA World Championship in Buenos Aires, Argentina. Over four tournament games, he averaged 0.5 points per game. The World Championship in Argentina was the inaugural tournament.

=== Coaching career ===
Sokolović coached the women's team of Crvena zvezda in the Yugoslav Women's Basketball League during 1950s. He succeeded Nebojša Popović on that coaching position.

Sokolović coached the Yugoslavia women's national team at the 1958 European Women's Basketball Championships in Poland.

=== Administrator ===
Sokolović served as the secretary-general of the Yugoslav Basketball Federation and as a President of basketball club Crvena zvezda.

== Journalism ==
Sokolović also worked as a sports journalist, contributing to Sport, a Serbian daily sports newspaper.

== Career achievements ==
As player

- Yugoslav League champion: 6 (with Crvena zvezda: 1947, 1948, 1949, 1950, 1951, 1952)

As coach

- Yugoslav Women's League champion: 5 (with Crvena zvezda: 1953, 1954, 1955, 1956, 1957)

== In popular culture ==
- In the 2015 Serbian sports drama We Will Be the World Champions Sokolović is portrayed by Nemanja Stamatović.
