= Srđan Kalember =

Yugoslav basketball player and coach

Personal information
- Born: 5 June 1928 Sarajevo, Kingdom of Serbs, Croats and Slovenes
- Died: 2 February 2016 (aged 87) Belgrade, Serbia
- Listed height: 1.80 m (5 ft 11 in)
- Listed weight: 73 kg (161 lb)

Career information
- NBA draft: 1950: undrafted
- Playing career: 1945–1964
- Position: Small forward
- Number: 12
- Coaching career: 1959–1990

Career history

Playing
- 1945–1954: Crvena zvezda
- 1958–1964: ABC Nantes

Coaching
- 1959–1962: ABC Nantes
- 1966–1971: Clermontois
- 1972–1973: Jugoplastika
- 1973–1974: SLUC Nancy
- 1974–1978: ESM Challans
- 1978–1979: FC Mulhouse
- 1981–1982: ESM Challans
- 1985: FC Mulhouse
- ?–1990: JA Vichy

Career Yugoslav League statistics
- Points: 734 (6.8 ppg)

Srđan Kalember (Serbian Cyrillic: Срђан Калембер; June 5, 1928 – February 2, 2016), also known in France by his nickname Serge (Serbian Cyrillic: Серж), was a Serbian professional basketball player and coach. He won 9 National Championships with Crvena zvezda. He represented the Yugoslavia national basketball team internationally.

== Early life ==
Kalember begins to play sports as a boy in 1938 when he won second place in the 60 meters race. On that occasion he received a kiss from Princess Elizabeth. During World War II he played football in Belgrade for the BASK, but was also interested in other sports.

== Playing career ==
=== Crvena zvezda ===
After the war Kalember wanted to continue to play football but Slobodan Ćosić persuaded him to play basketball where was less competition. He was present at the famous meeting in Deligradska Street when formed Crvena zvezda Sports Association. In beginnings, he was in reserves, but quickly become the standard first team player status of Crvena zvezda. In July 1950, he was a member of the Zvezda squad that won an international cup tournament in Milan, Italy.

In total Kalember played 108 games and scored 734 points for Crvena zvezda from 1946 to 1954. Kalember is remembered as an extraordinary skirt.

=== Nantes ===
Kalember went to France in 1958 where he played for ABC Nantes.

== National team career ==
Kalember was a member of the Yugoslavia national basketball team that participated at the 1947 European Championship in Prague, Czechoslovakia. He played one game in the tournament without any records. He was a member of the team at the 1950 FIBA World Championship in Buenos Aires, Argentina. Over four tournament games, he averaged 4.5 points per game. Kalember was a member of the national team at the 1953 European Championship in Moscow, the Soviet Union. Over four tournament games, he averaged one point per game.

Kalember played 47 games for the national team during his career.

== Coaching career ==
In France, Kalember become a head coach of ABC Nantes. In late 1960s, he coached Clermontois.

Kalember was two years coach of Jugoplastika, the team with which he won the first Yugoslav Cup in 1972. After that, they reached the final of the 1972–73 FIBA European Cup Winners' Cup and to 1973 FIBA Intercontinental Cup competition in São Paulo.

In late 1974 career again took him to France. Kalember took over the team SLUC Nancy then Vendée Challans and FC Mulhouse Basket and in 1990 finished his coaching career in JA Vichy.

== Personal life ==
Kalember was born in Sarajevo to 2nd lieut. Jovan, an army pilot, and Julija (1899–1999). His mother's uncle was Dušan Simović, the 18th Prime Minister of Yugoslavia.

Kalember dated Ljubica Otašević for three and a half years while he played for Crvena zvezda and Ljubica played basketball for the Crvena zvezda women's team.

Kalember and his wife were married in 1971 in Lyon, France. The couple had a daughter, Olja (b. 1973). His wife, Nataša Bebić, was a professional basketball player and played for Yugoslavia national team during the 1960s. Nataša played for Clermont-Ferrand.

== Career achievements ==
=== Player ===
- Yugoslav League champion: 9 (with Crvena zvezda: 1946, 1947, 1948, 1949, 1950, 1951, 1952, 1953, 1954).

=== Coach ===
- Yugoslav Cup winner: 1 (with Jugoplastika: 1971–72).
- FIBA European Cup Winners' Cup runner-up: 1 (with Jugoplastika: 1972–73).

== In popular culture ==
- In 2015 Serbian sports drama We Will Be the World Champions Kalember is portrayed by Radovan Vujović and his girlfriend Ljubica is portrayed by Nina Janković.

== See also ==
- List of KK Crvena zvezda players with 100 games played
