= KK Zrinjevac =

Zrinjevac 1937
- Leagues: A2 liga
- Founded: 1937; 86 years ago
- History: 1937–present
- Arena: Dom Sportova
- Capacity: 3,100
- Location: Zagreb, Croatia
- Team colors: Green and White
- President: Vlado Vanjak
Home	Away

Košarkaški klub Zrinjevac 1937 (English: Zrinjevac 1937 Basketball Club) is a professional men's basketball club based in Zagreb, Croatia. It competes in the Croatian Second Basketball League.

== Name changes ==
- KS Martinovka (1937–1945)
- Element (1945)
- Jedinstvo (1946–1952)
- Monter (1952–1953)
- Montažno (1953–1957)
- Jugomontaža (1957—1964)
- Trešnjevka (1964—1970)
- Industromontaža (1970—1978)
- Monting (1978–1988)
- Montmontaža (1988—1990)
- Industromontaža (1990—1992)
- Zrinjevac 1937 (1992–present)

== Honours ==
=== Domestic ===
- HT Premijer liga finalists: 1994–95

== Notable players ==
- (Croatia) Franjo Arapović
- (Croatia) Zoran Čutura
- (Croatia) Mario Kasun
- (Croatia) Emilio Kovačić
- (Croatia) Ivica Marić
- (Croatia) Ivan Meheš
- (Croatia) Dario Šarić
- (Croatia) Zdravko Radulović
- (Croatia) Damjan Rudež
- (Croatia) Ivica Zubac
- (Croatia) Damir Tvrdić
- (Croatia) Siniša Kelečević
- (Croatia) Mladen Cetinja
