= Aleksandar Gec =

Serbian basketball player and coach

Personal information
- Born: 3 March 1928 Belgrade, Kingdom of Serbs, Croats, and Slovenes
- Died: 12 April 2008 (aged 80) Belgrade, Serbia
- Listed height: 1.89 m (6 ft 2 in)

Career information
- NBA draft: 1950: undrafted
- Playing career: 1945–1953
- Position: Guard
- Number: 10
- Coaching career: 1956–1959

Career history

Playing
- 1945–1953: Crvena zvezda

Coaching
- 1956–1959: Crvena zvezda

Career highlights
- As player: 8× Yugoslav League champion (1946–1953)
Medals
Men's basketball
Representing Yugoslavia
Balkan and Central Europe Games
Silver medal – second place	1947 Albania	Team
Bronze medal – third place	1946 Romania	Team

Aleksandar Gec (Serbian Cyrillic: Александар Гец; 3 March 1928 – 12 April 2008) was a Serbian professional basketball player, coach and administrator. He was the first basketball star of Crvena zvezda. He represented the Yugoslavia national basketball team internationally.

== Early life ==
Gec spent his whole lifetime in Belgrade, where he finished his education. He went to the Third Men's Gymnasium.

== Playing career ==
=== Crvena zvezda ===
Gec began playing basketball for Crvena zvezda team in 1945, practically since its foundation. With Crvena zvezda he has won the eight Yugoslav National Championships in a row from 1945 until 1953. In July 1950, he was a member of the Zvezda squad that won an international cup tournament in Milan, Italy.

In the 1952 Championship Gec averaged 8.5 points per game (110 points in 13 matches). He is known for game against Proleter Zrenjanin in 1952. Four seconds before the end of the game, the score was tied when he took responsibility and scored with a shot from half court, but the crowd formed at the scorer's table and the judges ruled to overturn the point and then return the ball to his team. Gec scored winning point from the same place.

After three games in the 1953 Championship Gec felt very bad. Doctors discovered serious illness of the left lung and because of that he finished his playing career with just 25.

=== Yugoslavia national team ===
As a player for the Yugoslavia national basketball team Gec participated in 1950 World Championship and two European Championship, 1947 in Prague and 1953 in Moscow.

== Coaching career ==
Gec become a head coach of Crvena zvezda in 1956 where he replaced Nebojša Popović on that position. After 1959 Yugoslav League season Gec left the job. He also coached the Yugoslavia women's national team at 1956 European Women's Basketball Championship in Prague, Czechoslovakia.

== Administrative career ==
Gec was President of Crvena zvezda during the 1970s when they won two National Championship, three Yugoslav Cups and the FIBA European Cup Winner's Cup in 1974.

After an Eternal derby in which Partizan won, Partizan fans beat up the few Red Star fans in front of the police who did not intervene. Gec is required to send a protest letter to the Director of Partizan, which was also the Minister of the Interior of Serbia. Gec's Associates declined because of fear, whereupon Gec submitted the irrevocable resignation.

== In popular culture ==
- In 2015 Serbian sports drama We Will Be the World Champions Gec is portrayed by Stevan Piale.

== Coaching record ==
Legend
W	Wins	L	Losses	D	Draws	W%	Winning percentage

=== Yugoslav First Basketball League ===
Season	Team	Games	W	D	L	W %	Result
1956	Crvena zvezda	18	10	3	5	.556	4th
1957	Crvena zvezda	18	11	1	6	.611	3rd
1958	Crvena zvezda	18	11	1	6	.611	3rd
1959	Crvena zvezda	18	11	1	6	.611	Runner-up
Career		72	43	6	23	.597	

== See also ==
- List of Red Star Belgrade basketball coaches
