= Branko Nešić =

Serbian-American basketball player

Personal information
- Born: 17 August 1934 (age 92) Belgrade, Kingdom of Yugoslavia

Career information
- NBA draft: 1956: undrafted
- Playing career: 1952–1965
- Number: 11

Career history
- 1952–1957: Crvena zvezda
- 1957–1963: Caen
- 1963–1965: Olympique Antibes

Branko Nešić (Serbian Cyrillic: Бранко Нешић; born 17 August 1934) is a Serbian-American former professional basketball player.

== Playing career ==
=== Crvena zvezda ===
Born in Belgrade, Nešić began with his basketball career with his hometown team Crvena zvezda Juniors. There his coach was Milan Bjegojević. In 1952, he joined the first team of Crvena zvezda. On 18 May 1952, Nešić made his Yugoslav League debut in a 44–22 win over Borac Čačak, recording two points. He won his first National Championship that season. He won three more titles in next three seasons, from 1953 to 1955. During his tenure in the Zvezda, his teammates were Bjegojević, Đorđe Andrijašević, Ladislav Demšar, Srđan Kalember, Borko Jovanović, Borislav Ćurčić, Dragan Godžić, Đorđe Konjović, and Obren Popović, while the team was coached by Nebojša Popović.

Following the departure of coach Popović after the 1955 season, Nešić played two more seasons for the Zvezda. On 8 September 1957, he played his final game for Crvena zvezda in a 91–73 win over Proleter Zrenjanin, recording one point. He made 53 official appearances for the club, scoring 116 points.

=== France ===
Following his departure from the Zvezda in 1957, Nešić moved to France where he joined Caen. Nešić played six seasons for Caen in the French National Championship 1 A. In 1963, he joined another French team, Olympique Antibes, where he played two more seasons. He retired as a player with Antibes in 1965.

== Career achievements ==
- Yugoslav League champion: 4 (with Crvena zvezda: 1952, 1953, 1954, 1955).

== Post-playing career ==
After retirement in 1965, Nešić emigrated to the United States.
