= 1946 KK Crvena zvezda season =

Crvena zvezda
1946 season
- Chairman: (Socialist Federal Republic of Yugoslavia) Mirko Aksentijević
- Head coach: (Socialist Federal Republic of Yugoslavia) Nebojša Popović
- Serbian League: Qualified
- Yugoslav League: Champions
- Scoring leader: (Socialist Federal Republic of Yugoslavia) Popović 9.3
- Biggest win: vs Makedonija 78–10
- Biggest defeat: vs Partizan 21–24
- All statistics correct as of July 30, 2017.

The 1946 season is the Crvena zvezda inaugural season in the existence of the club. The team played in the Yugoslav Basketball League.

== Players ==
=== Squad information ===
Crvena zvezda roster
Players
Coaches

| Pos. | No. | Nat. | Name | Ht. |
|---|---|---|---|---|
| | | (Socialist Federal Republic of Yugoslavia) | Balubdžić, Tihomir |
| | | (Socialist Federal Republic of Yugoslavia) | Banjac, Vladimir |
| G | | (Socialist Federal Republic of Yugoslavia) | Dimić, Ivan | 1.78 m (5 ft 10 in) |
| G | 10 | (Socialist Federal Republic of Yugoslavia) | Gec, Aleksandar | 1.89 m (6 ft 2 in) |
| | | (Socialist Federal Republic of Yugoslavia) | Jovanović, Rade |
| SF | 12 | (Socialist Federal Republic of Yugoslavia) | Kalember, Srđan | 1.80 m (5 ft 11 in) |
| | | (Socialist Federal Republic of Yugoslavia) | Meštrović, Relja |
| | 8 | (Socialist Federal Republic of Yugoslavia) | Popović, Nebojša (C) |
| C | 15 | (Socialist Federal Republic of Yugoslavia) | Stanković, Borislav |
| G | 14 | (Socialist Federal Republic of Yugoslavia) | Stefanović, Miodrag | 1.75 m (5 ft 9 in) |
| G | 9 | (Socialist Federal Republic of Yugoslavia) | Stojković, Vasilije | 1.78 m (5 ft 10 in) |

Head coach

- (Socialist Federal Republic of Yugoslavia) Nebojša Popović

Legend

- (C) Team captain
- Injured

== Competitions ==
=== Overall ===
| Competition | Started round | Final position / round | First match | Last match |
|---|---|---|---|---|
| Belgrade Championship | Matchday 1 | Qualified | 1 June 1946 | 23 June 1946 |
| Serbian State League | Matchday 1 | Qualified | 16 August 1946 | 18 August 1946 |
| Yugoslav Federal League | Matchday 1 | Champions | 3 September 1946 | 8 September 1946 |

Source: Competitions

=== Overview ===
| Competition | Record | | | | | | | |
| Competition | Pld | W | D | L | PF | PA | PD | Win % |
|---|---|---|---|---|---|---|---|---|
| Belgrade Championship | 5 | 5 | 0 | 0 | 296 | 60 | +236 | 100.00 |
| Serbian State League | 3 | 3 | 0 | 0 | 100 | 41 | +59 | 100.00 |
| Yugoslav Federal League | 7 | 6 | 0 | 1 | 305 | 107 | +198 | 85.71 |
| Total | 15 | 14 | 0 | 1 | 701 | 208 | +493 | 93.33 |

Last updated: July 30, 2017
Source: Competitions

=== Belgrade Championship ===
| 1 June 1946 1 | Crvena zvezda | 118–4 | Kosmaj Mladenovac | Belgrade |

| 8 June 1946 2 | Crvena zvezda | 38–21 | Metalac Beograd | Belgrade |

| 15 June 1946 3 | Crvena zvezda | 81–11 | Vračar | Belgrade |

| 22 June 1946 4 | Crvena zvezda | 39–24 | Student | Belgrade |

| 23 June 1946 5 | Crvena zvezda | 20–0 | Botip | Belgrade |

=== Serbian State League ===
==== League table ====
| Pos | Teams | Pts | Pld | W | L | PF | PA | Champion or relegation |
|---|---|---|---|---|---|---|---|---|
| 1. | Crvena zvezda | 6 | 3 | 3 | 0 | 100 | 41 | Qualified for Yugoslav League |
| 2. | Metalac | 4 | 3 | 2 | 1 | 166 | 145 | Qualified for Yugoslav League |
| 3. | Metohija | 1 | 3 | 1 | 2 | 45 | 80 | |
| 4. | Omladinac | 0 | 3 | 0 | 3 | 32 | 110 | |

Source: OKK Beograd

Win Loss

==== Matches ====
| 16 August 1946 1 | Crvena zvezda | 45–22 | Metohija | Belgrade |

| 17 August 1946 2 | Crvena zvezda | 39–8 | Omladinac | Belgrade |

| 18 August 1946 3 | Crvena zvezda | 16–11 | Metalac | Belgrade |
| | | | Pts: Mioljub Denić 4 |

=== Yugoslav League ===
==== League table ====
| Pos | Teams | Pts | Pld | W | L | PF | PA | Champion or relegation |
|---|---|---|---|---|---|---|---|---|
| 1. | Crvena zvezda | 12 | 7 | 6 | 1 | 305 | 107 | Champion |
| 2. | Zadar | 10 | 7 | 5 | 2 | 166 | 145 | |
| 3. | Egység Novi Sad | 10 | 7 | 5 | 2 | 186 | 194 | |
| 4. | Partizan | 8 | 7 | 4 | 3 | 211 | 106 | |
| 5. | Slavija Zagreb | 8 | 7 | 4 | 3 | 142 | 126 | |

Source: Yugoslav First Basketball League Archive, OKK Beograd

Win Loss

==== Matches ====
| 3 September 1946 1 | Crvena zvezda | 78–10 | Makedonija | Belgrade |
| | | | | Arena: Kalemegdan Court |

| 4 September 1946 2 | Crvena zvezda | 61–17 | Egység Novi Sad | Belgrade |
| | | | | Arena: Kalemegdan Court |

| 4 September 1946 3 | Crvena zvezda | 26–18 | Slavija Zagreb | Belgrade |
| | | | | Arena: Kalemegdan Court |

| 6 September 1946 4 | Crvena zvezda | 41–9 | Zadar | Belgrade |
| | | | | Arena: Kalemegdan Court |

| 6 September 1946 5 | Crvena zvezda | 21–24 | Partizan | Belgrade |
| | Scoring by half: 9–10, 12–14 |
| | Pts: Vasilije Stojković 7 | Boxscore | | Arena: Kalemegdan Court; Attendance: 2,000; Referees: Stevica Čolović |

| 8 September 1946 6 | Crvena zvezda | 44–12 | Svoboda | Belgrade |
| | | | | Arena: Kalemegdan Court |

| 7 September 1946 7 | Crvena zvezda | 34–17 | Metalac | Belgrade |
| | | | Pts: Ratko Kašanin 8 | Arena: Kalemegdan Court |

Source: KK Crvena zvezda History

== Statistics ==
Legend
| GP | Games played |
| PPG | Points per game |

| * | Led the league |

| Player | GP | PPG |
|---|---|---|
| Tihomir Balubdžić | 7 | 1.3 |
| Vladimir Banjac | 7 | 0.9 |
| Ivan Dimić | 7 | 0.9 |
| Aleksandar Gec | 7 | 6.3 |
| Rade Jovanović | 7 | 1.7 |
| Srđan Kalember | 7 | 6.4 |
| Relja Mešterović | 7 | 1.4 |
| Nebojša Popović | 7 | 9.3 |
| Borislav Stanković | 7 | 7.0 |
| Miodrag Stefanović | 7 | 3.4 |
| Vasilije Stojković | 7 | 4.9 |

Source: Crvena zvezda
