= Ivan Dimić =

Serbian basketball player

Personal information
- Born: 4 July 1921 Geneva, Switzerland
- Died: 19 October 2004 (aged 83) Belgrade, Serbia and Montenegro
- Listed height: 1.78 m (5 ft 10 in)
- Position: Guard

Career history
- 1942: SK 1913
- 1945: Serbia
- 1946: Crvena zvezda
Medals
Men's basketball
Representing Yugoslavia
Balkan and Central Europe Games
Bronze medal – third place	1946 Romania	Team

Ivan Dimić (Serbian Cyrillic: Иван Димић; 4 July 1921 – 19 October 2004) was a Serbian basketball player.

== Playing career ==
Dimić took future FIBA Hall of Famer Nebojša Popović to his first training session in Belgrade. Dimić played for a Belgrade-based team Crvena zvezda of the Yugoslav First League. In the 1946 season, he won the National Championships. In the 1946 Zvezda season, Dimić averaged 0.9 points per game while appearing in all 7 games.
