= Miodrag Stefanović (basketball) =

Serbian basketball player, coach and referee

Personal information
- Born: 20 October 1922
- Died: 1 December 1998 (aged 76)
- Listed height: 1.75 m (5 ft 9 in)

Career information
- Playing career: 1942–1946
- Position: Guard
- Coaching career: 1947–1964

Career history

Playing
- 1942: SK 1913
- 1945: Serbia
- 1946: Crvena zvezda

Coaching
- Radnički Belgrade
- 1951–1952: Austria
- 1953: Partizan
- 1954: Partizan (youth)
- 1962–1963: Tunisia
- 1962–1964: Yugoslavia (women's team)

Miodrag "Mija" Stefanović (Serbian Cyrillic: Миодраг Мија Стефановић; 20 October 1922 – 1 December 1998) was a Serbian basketball player, coach and referee. He represented the Yugoslavia national basketball team internationally.

== Playing career ==
Stefanović played for Belgrade-based team Crvena zvezda of the Yugoslav First League. With the Zvezda, he won the National Championships in the 1946 season. In the 1946 Zvezda season, Stefanović averaged 3.4 points per game while appearing in all 7 games.

== National team career ==
Stefanović was a member of the Yugoslavia national team which participated at the 1947 FIBA European Championship in Prague, Czechoslovakia. He played one game at the tournament and scored 2 points.

== Coaching career ==
Stefanović coached Partizan during the 1953 season in the Yugoslav First League.

=== National teams ===
Stefanović coached the Austria men's national team at the EuroBasket 1951.

Stefanović coached the Yugoslavia women's national team at two European Women's Basketball Championships (1962 and 1964).

== Referee career ==
Stefanović was a referee at the 1952 Summer Olympics. After the tournament, he retired.

== Career achievements and awards ==
- Yugoslav League champion: 1 (with Crvena zvezda: 1946).

== See also ==
- List of KK Partizan head coaches
