= Miroljub Čavić =

Serbian basketball player

Career information
- Playing career: 1954–1962

Career history
- 1954–1962: Crvena zvezda

Miroljub Čavić (Serbian Cyrillic: Мирољуб Чавић) was a Serbian basketball player.

== Playing career ==
Čavić played for a Belgrade-based team Crvena zvezda of the Yugoslav First League over nine seasons, from 1954 to 1962. He won two National Championships in his first two seasons with the Zvezda squads led by head coach Nebojša Popović. Čavić played over 130 games for the Zvezda and got promoted to the Zvezda's Club 100.

== Career achievements ==
- Yugoslav League champion: 2 (with Crvena zvezda: 1954, 1955).

== See also ==
- List of KK Crvena zvezda players with 100 games played
