= Đorđe Konjović =

Serbian basketball player

Personal information
- Born: 2 January 1931 (age 95) Senta, Kingdom of Yugoslavia
- Listed height: 2.02 m (6 ft 8 in)

Career information
- NBA draft: 1953: undrafted
- Playing career: 1949–1958
- Position: Center
- Number: 8, 3

Career history
- 1949–1952: Senta
- 1953–1957: Crvena zvezda
- 1958: Partizan

Career highlights
- As player: 3× Yugoslav League champion (1953–1955)

Đorđe Konjović (Serbian Cyrillic: Ђорђе Коњовић; born 2 January 1931) is a Serbian retired basketball player. He represented the Yugoslavia national basketball team internationally.

== Playing career ==
During his playing career in the 1950s, Konjović was on Belgrade-based teams Crvena zvezda and Partizan of the Yugoslav Federal League and two of the biggest and most popular clubs in Serbia. He is one of eight players who recorded at least 30 points in the Crvena zvezda–Partizan derbies for both teams.

Konjović won three Yugoslav Championships with the Zvezda team coached by Nebojša Popović. During this stint he played with Milan Bjegojević, Đorđe Andrijašević, Ladislav Demšar, Srđan Kalember, and Borislav Ćurčić.

== National team career ==
Konjović was a member of the Yugoslavia national team that participated at the 1954 FIBA World Championship. Over four tournament games, he averaged 1.7 points per game. In the next year, he was a member of the team that participated at the 1955 European Championship. Over eleven tournament games, he averaged 5.6 points per game.

Konjović was the first player taller than 2 m (6 ft 7 in) who played for Yugoslavia.

== Career achievements and awards ==
- Yugoslav League champion: 3 (with Crvena zvezda: 1953, 1954, 1955).

== Personal life ==
Konjović is related to painter Milan Konjović, composer Petar Konjović, industrialist Dimitrije Konjović, and Brigitte Konjovic, a French beauty pageant and Miss France 1978.
