= Milivoje Matić =

Retired Serbian basketball player (born 1938)

Personal information
- Born: 7 June 1938 (age 88) Belgrade, Yugoslavia

Career information
- Playing career: 1956–1966
- Position: Guard
- Number: 10

Career history
- 1956–1966: Crvena zvezda

Milivoje Matić (Serbian Cyrillic: Миливоје Матић; born 7 June 1938) is a retired Serbian basketball player and sports physician.

== Playing career ==
Matić and his twin brother summered in Opatija in 1951, where they met Milorad Sokolović and Borko Jovanović, then players of Crvena zvezda. At their invitation, after the summer vacation, in October, the Matić brothers go to the Zvezda to train basketball. With incredible persistence, he became the best player in the youth system under coach Strahinja Alagić in less than a year.

Matić progressed year after year, and he got the attention of coach Nebojša Popović, who promoted him to the first squad of Crvena Zvezda in 1956 when he turned 18. On 22 April 1956, he made his Yugoslav League debut for the team in an 83–75 win over Ljubljana, recording 15 points. As a guard, he played for the first squad of Crvena Zvezda for the next ten years and was the team captain. In total, over 165 games, he recorded 954 points. On 29 October 1966, he played his final game with a 78–68 win over Željezničar Karlovac.

== Post-playing career ==
Matić ended his playing career in 1966 when he became the team physician and team manager at Crvena Zvezda. He remained in that position until 1976 when he moved to the Yugoslav Institute for Physical Culture and Sports Medicine in Belgrade.

== See also ==
- List of KK Crvena zvezda players with 100 games played
