= Milan Blagojević (basketball) =

Serbian basketball player

Personal information
- Born: 27 July 1929 (age 97)

Career information
- Playing career: 1947–1956
- Number: 14

Career history
- 1947–1948: Crvena zvezda
- 1951–1956: Partizan

Career highlights
- 2× Yugoslav League champion (1947, 1948)

Milan Blagojević (Serbian Cyrillic: Милан Благојевић; born 27 July 1929) is a Serbian former basketball player. He represented the Yugoslavia national basketball team internationally.

== Playing career ==
Blagojević played for Belgrade-based teams Partizan and Crvena zvezda of the Yugoslav First League. During his stint with Crvena zvezda he won two Yugoslav Championships.

== National team career ==
Blagojević was a member of the Yugoslavia national team that participated at the 1954 FIBA World Championship in Buenos Aires, Argentina. Over three tournament games, he averaged 4.7 points per game.

== Career achievements and awards ==
- Yugoslav League champion: 2 (with Crvena zvezda: 1947, 1948).

== See also ==
- Blagojević (family name)
