= Milan Radivojević =

Yugoslav basketball player

Career information
- Playing career: 1953–1958
- Number: 8

Career history
- 1953–1954: Crvena zvezda
- 1955–1958: Partizan

Milan Radivojević (Serbian Cyrillic: Милан Радивојевић) was a Yugoslav basketball player.

== Playing career ==
During his playing career in the 1950s, Radivojević was on Belgrade-based teams Partizan and Crvena zvezda of the Yugoslav Federal League. During his stint with Crvena zvezda he won two Yugoslav Championships.

== Career achievements and awards ==
- Yugoslav League champion: 2 (with Crvena zvezda: 1953, 1954).

== See also ==
- KK Partizan all-time roster
