= Tihomir Balubdžić =

Serbian basketball player

Career history
- 1946–1947: Crvena zvezda
- 1951: BSK

Tihomir Balubdžić was a Yugoslav basketball player.

== Playing career ==
Balubdžić played for a Belgrade-based clubs Crvena zvezda and BSK of the Yugoslav First League.

In the 1946 season, he won the National Championships with Crvena zvezda. Over seven 1946 Zvezda season games, Balubdžić averaged 1.3 points per game.

Over 15 appearances during the 1951 season for BSK, Balubdžić averaged 3.1 points per game.
