= Radivoje Ostojić =

Yugoslav basketball player

Career information
- Playing career: 1942–1956

Career history
- 1942: SK 1913
- 1946–1949: Metalac Belgrade
- 1954–1956: Crvena zvezda

Radivoje Ostojić (Serbian Cyrillic: Радивоје Остојић) was a Yugoslav basketball player.

== Playing career ==
During his playing career in the late 1940 and 1950s, Ostojić was on Belgrade-based teams Metalac and Crvena zvezda of the Yugoslav Federal League. During his stint with Crvena zvezda he won two Yugoslav Championships.

== Career achievements and awards ==
- Yugoslav League champion: 2 (with Crvena zvezda: 1954, 1955).
