= Branko Kovačević (basketball) =

Yugoslav basketball player

Personal information
- Born: 15 March 1951 (age 75) Valjevo, SFR Yugoslavia
- Listed height: 1.94 m (6 ft 4 in)

Career information
- NBA draft: 1973: undrafted
- Playing career: 1969–1986
- Position: Small forward
- Number: 14

Career history
- 1969–1978: Metalac
- 1979–1984: Crvena zvezda
- 1984–1986: Smelt Olimpija

Branko Kovačević (Serbian Cyrillic: Бранко Ковачевић; born 15 March 1951) is a retired Yugoslav professional basketball player.

== Playing career ==
Kovačević started his career in Valjevo, playing for a struggling Second Division side Metalac. He became a key player for Metalac, guiding them to promotion in First Federal Basketball League in 1973. With Kovačević as their best player and one of the best scorers in the entire First Division, Metalac spent memorable years in the top flight. His brother Zoran played in the same time at that time. Over five seasons with Metalac, Kovačević averaged 25 points per game.

In 1979, Kovačević signed for Crvena zvezda. He helped his team to reach the 1984 Korać Cup final, after scoring 34 points in the semi-final first leg against Zaragoza.

After five years in the Zvezda, Kovačević signed for Smelt Olimpija. Once again, Kovačević managed to help his team gain promotion from First B Federal Basketball League.

== National team career ==
Kovačević was a member of the Yugoslavia national junior team at the 1970 FIBA Europe Championship for Juniors. Over five tournament games, he averaged 3.4 points per game.

== Post-playing career ==
Kovačević was a sporting director for Crvena zvezda during late 1990s and through 2000s. Also, he was a secretary general of the Belgrade Sports Association, board member of the Basketball Federation of Serbia and Montenegro, and deputy secretary general of the Crvena Zvezda Sports Society.

== See also ==
- List of KK Crvena zvezda players with 100 games played
