= 1952 Yugoslav First Basketball League =

Yugoslav First Basketball League
- Season: 1952
- Games played: 6
- Teams: 4

Regular season
- Top seed: Crvena zvezda

Finals
- Champions: Crvena zvezda (7th title)
- Runners-up: Proleter Zrenjanin
- All statistics correct as of 26 April 2017.

The 1952 Yugoslav First Basketball League season is the 8th season of the Yugoslav First Basketball League, the highest professional basketball league in SFR Yugoslavia.

== Teams ==
(Socialist Republic of Serbia) PR Serbia
- Borac Čačak
- BSK Belgrade
- Crvena Zvezda
- Partizan
- Proleter Zrenjanin
- Železničar Belgrade
(Socialist Republic of Croatia) PR Croatia
- Lokomotiva Zagreb
- Mladost Zagreb
- Monter Zagreb
- Zadar
- Željezničar Karlovac
(Socialist Republic of Slovenia) PR Slovenia
- AŠK Ljubljana
- Železničar Ljubljana

== Regular season ==
=== East ===
Pos	Teams	Played	Won	Draw	Lost	FA	Points	Status
1.	Crvena Zvezda	10	9	0	1	531:401	18	Qualified to the final group stage
2.	Partizan	10	6	0	4	442:388	12	Qualified to the preliminary round of Playoffs
3.	Proleter Zrenjanin	10	6	0	4	370:409	12	Qualified to the preliminary round of Playoffs
4.	BSK Belgrade	10	3	2	5	391:424	8	
5.	Železničar Beograd	10	2	1	7	440:494	5	
6.	Borac Čačak	10	2	1	7	307:365	5	

=== West ===
Pos	Teams	Played	Won	Lost	FA	Points	Status
1.	Mladost Zagreb	10	7	3	470:439	14	Qualified to the final group stage
2.	AŠK Ljubljana	10	6	4	487:445	12	Qualified to the preliminary round of Playoffs
3.	Zadar	10	6	4	396:373	12	Qualified to the preliminary round of Playoffs
4.	Železničar Ljubljana	10	4	6	444:460	8	
5.	Monter Zagreb	10	4	6	456:493	8	
6.	Željezničar Karlovac	10	3	7	430:473	6	

== Play off ==
=== Preliminary round ===
(2) Partizan- (3) Zadar 45–37, 51–32

(2) AŠK Ljubljana - (3) Proleter Zrenjanin 41-38, 37-49

=== Final group stage ===
Pos	Teams	Pld	W	L	PF	PA	Pts	Champion or relegation
1.	Crvena Zvezda	3	3	0	156	115	6	Champion
2.	Proleter Zrenjanin	3	2	1	136	132	4	
3.	Partizan	3	1	2	104	131	2	
4.	Mladost	3	0	3	137	155	0	

== Winning Roster ==
The winning roster of Crvena Zvezda:

- (Socialist Federal Republic of Yugoslavia) Borislav Ćurčić
- (Socialist Federal Republic of Yugoslavia) Ladislav Demšar
- (Socialist Federal Republic of Yugoslavia) Aleksandar Gec
- (Socialist Federal Republic of Yugoslavia) Srđan Kalember
- (Socialist Federal Republic of Yugoslavia) Dragan Godžić
- (Socialist Federal Republic of Yugoslavia) Milan Bjegojević
- (Socialist Federal Republic of Yugoslavia) Branko Nešić
- (Socialist Federal Republic of Yugoslavia) Đorđe Andrijašević
- (Socialist Federal Republic of Yugoslavia) Borko Jovanović

Coach: (Socialist Federal Republic of Yugoslavia) Nebojša Popović
