= 1954 Yugoslav First Basketball League =

Yugoslav First Basketball League
- Season: 1954
- Games played: 132
- Teams: 12

Regular season
- Top seed: Crvena zvezda

Finals
- Champions: Crvena zvezda (9th title)
- Runners-up: Mladost

Statistical leaders
Points	(Socialist Federal Republic of Yugoslavia) Boris Kristančič	27.2
- All statistics correct as of 26 April 2017.

The 1954 Yugoslav First Basketball League season is the 10th season of the Yugoslav First Basketball League, the highest professional basketball league in SFR Yugoslavia.

== Teams ==
(Socialist Republic of Serbia) PR Serbia
- Borac Čačak
- BSK
- Crvena Zvezda
- Partizan
- Proleter Zrenjanin
- Radnički Belgrade
(Socialist Republic of Croatia) PR Croatia
- Lokomotiva
- Mladost Zagreb
- Montažno
- Željezničar Karlovac
(Socialist Republic of Slovenia) PR Slovenia
- Enotnost
- ŽKK Ljubljana

== Regular season ==
=== League table ===
Pos	Teams	Pts	Pld	W	D	L	PF	PA	Champion or relegation
1.	Crvena zvezda	32	22	16	0	6	1483	1278	Champion
2.	Mladost	31	22	15	1	6	1379	1277	
3.	Proleter Zrenjanin	30	22	15	0	7	1443	1345	
4.	Enotnost	27	22	13	1	8	1394	1313	
5.	Partizan	26	22	12	2	8	1432	1386	
6.	Lokomotiva	25	22	12	1	9	1311	1274	
7.	Montažno	24	22	12	0	10	1359	1361	
8.	BSK	23	22	11	1	10	1401	1360	
9.	Ljubljana	18	22	7	4	11	1268	1259	
10.	Željezničar Karlovac	10	22	5	0	17	1166	1323	Relegated
11.	Borac Čačak	10	22	5	0	17	1134	1328	Relegated
12.	Radnički Belgrade	10	22	4	0	18	1183	1449	Relegated

== Winning Roster ==
The winning roster of Crvena zvezda:

- (Socialist Federal Republic of Yugoslavia) Dragan Godžić
- (Socialist Federal Republic of Yugoslavia) Đorđe Andrijašević
- (Socialist Federal Republic of Yugoslavia) Obren Popović
- (Socialist Federal Republic of Yugoslavia) Borislav Ćurčić
- (Socialist Federal Republic of Yugoslavia) Ladislav Demšar
- (Socialist Federal Republic of Yugoslavia) Milan Bjegojević
- (Socialist Federal Republic of Yugoslavia) Vojislav Pavasović
- (Socialist Federal Republic of Yugoslavia) Borko Jovanović
- (Socialist Federal Republic of Yugoslavia) Miroljub Čavić
- (Socialist Federal Republic of Yugoslavia) Radivoje Ostojić
- (Socialist Federal Republic of Yugoslavia) Đorđe Konjović
- (Socialist Federal Republic of Yugoslavia) Đorđe Otašević
- (Socialist Federal Republic of Yugoslavia) Srđan Kalember
- (Socialist Federal Republic of Yugoslavia) Milorad Ðerić
- (Socialist Federal Republic of Yugoslavia) Milan Radivojević
- (Socialist Federal Republic of Yugoslavia) Branko Nešić

Coach: (Socialist Federal Republic of Yugoslavia) Nebojša Popović
