= Zmago Sagadin =

Slovenian basketball coach

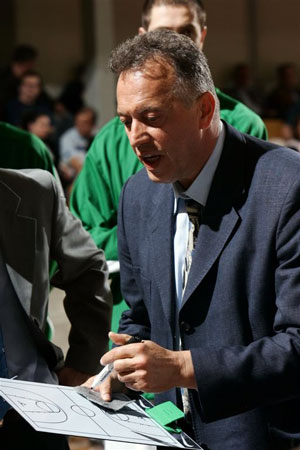
- Sagadin in 2006

Personal information
- Born: 1 November 1952 (age 74) Celje, PR Slovenia, FPR Yugoslavia
- Listed height: 6 ft 3 in (1.91 m)
- Listed weight: 195 lb (88 kg)

Career information
- Playing career: 1974–present

Career history
- 1974–1981: Libela Celje
- 1981–1985: Maribor
- 1985–1994: Smelt Olimpija
- 1995–1996: KK Split (Croatia Osiguranje)
- 1996–2002: Union Olimpija
- 2002–2004: Crvena zvezda
- 2005–2006: Union Olimpija
- 2006–2007: Lietuvos rytas
- 2008: Anwil Włocławek
- 2009–2010: Zadar
- 2011–2014: Helios Domžale
- 2014: MZT Skopje

Zmago Sagadin (/sɑːˈɡɑːdɪn/; born 1 November 1952) is a Slovenian basketball coach. He is widely considered as the most successful Slovenian coach with 25 championship titles both on a national and international level, recognized 9 times as Slovenian Top Coach of the Year and recipient of many other honorary awards.

Sagadin is known for his work with young players, which resulted in 11 of his players moving on to compete in the NBA – more than any other coach in Europe – and helped numerous others to achieve the highest European level.

Sagadin last worked as head coach of MZT Skopje in 2014/2015 season, but has been active as a sports commentator, basketball strategy consultant and mentor. From 2011 to 2014, Sagadin was head of staff at KK Helios Domžale, where he formed a center for development of young basketball talents, including Klemen Prepelič, Gregor Hrovat, Blaž Mahkovic and Matic Rebec.

Sagadin is known for his development of players who compete internationally and in NBA. Success of Union Olimpija Ljubljana (formerly Smelt Olimpija), during his time coaching the team, contributed to establishing basketball as part of Slovenian sport culture and recognition of Union Olimpija as a reputable European club.

Sagadin is also the founder of Slovenia's first national basketball team and co-founder of the Adriatic Basketball League, author of basketball-related articles, served eight years as a President of Slovenian Basketball Coaches Association, and lectures for KZS, FIBA and ULEB-organized seminars and clinics.

== Career achievements ==
=== Club Titles ===
- FIBA European Cup winner: 1 (with Olimpija: 1993–94)
- Adriatic League champion: 1 (with Olimpija: 2001–02)
- Slovenian League champion: 10 (with Olimpija: 1991–92, 1992–93, 1993–94, 1994–95, 1996–97, 1997–98, 1998–99, 2000–01, 2001–02, 2005–06)
- Slovenian Cup winner: 11 (with Olimpija: 1991–92, 1992–93, 1993–94, 1994–95, 1996–97, 1997–98, 1998–99, 1999–00, 2000–01, 2001–02, 2005–06)
- Serbia & Montenegro Cup winner: 1 (with Crvena zvezda: 2003–04)

and

- Euroleague Final Four – 3rd place with Olimpija: 1996–97

=== Awards ===
- Slovenian Coach of the Year – 1992/93, 1993/94, 1994/95, 1996/97, 1997/98, 1998/99, 1999/00, 2000/01, 2001/02

=== Players ===
He developed many great basketball players: Beno Udrih, Primož Brezec, Boštjan Nachbar, Šarūnas Jasikevičius, Jiří Welsch, Marko Milič, Vladimir Stepania, Soumaila Samake, Radisav Ćurčić (former NBA), Vladimir Boisa, Sani Bečirovič, Nikola Vujčić, Vlado Ilievski, Gregor Fučka, Jurica Golemac, Ariel McDonald, Marko Tušek, Boris Gorenc, Jasmin Hukić, Ivica Jurković, Gregor Hafner, Klemen Prepelič.

He helped the career of Igor Rakočević, Scoonie Penn, Obinna Ekezie, Mindaugas Žukauskas, Sandro Nicević, Yotam Halperin.

=== Coaches ===
Sagadin served as a mentor to many of his former assistant coaches and players who are now head coaches:

- Sašo Filipovski (CSKA Moscow, Lottomatica Roma, Turow Zgorzelec, Union Olimpija),
- Tomo Mahorič (BC Kyiv, Slask Wrocław, Lietuvos Rytas, Union Olimpija),
- Neven Spahija (Tau Ceramica, Maccabi Tel Aviv, Lietuvos rytas),
- Aleksandar Trifunović, (Lietuvos rytas, Crvena zvezda),
- Zoran Martič (Union Olimpija, Domžale, Slovan, Pivovarna Laško),
- Jure Zdovc (Union Olimpija, Bosna, Split, Iraklis, Panionios).

== See also ==
- List of Radivoj Korać Cup-winning head coaches

=== About ===
- Euroleague.net coach profile: Zmago Sagadin
- Eurobasket.com Zmago Sagadin profile
- Union Olimpija history

=== Interviews ===
- Polet: "Prva peterka bo slovenska!"
- Adriatic League interview: Zmago Sagadin
- MojeDelo interview: Zmago Sagadin
