= 1947 Yugoslav First Basketball League =

Yugoslav First Basketball League
- Season: 1947
- Games played: 10
- Teams: 5

Regular season
- Top seed: Crvena zvezda

Finals
- Champions: Crvena zvezda (2st title)
- Runners-up: Zadar
- All statistics correct as of 24 April 2017.

The 1947 Yugoslav First Basketball League season is the 3rd season of the Yugoslav First Basketball League, the highest professional basketball league in SFR Yugoslavia.

The competition was held as a six-team tournament held in Zagreb.

== Teams ==
(Socialist Republic of Serbia) PR Serbia
- Crvena Zvezda
- Partizan
- Proleter Zrenjanin
(Socialist Republic of Croatia) PR Croatia
- Jedinstvo
- Zadar

== Regular season ==
=== League table ===
Pos	Teams	Pts	Pld	W	L	PF	PA	Champion or relegation
1.	Crvena Zvezda	8	4	4	0	167	118	Champion
2.	Zadar	4	4	2	2	192	158	
3.	Partizan	4	4	2	2	179	152	
4.	Proleter Zrenjanin	4	4	2	2	178	159	
5.	Jedinstvo	0	4	0	4	118	247	

Partizan - Zadar 54 - 40

== Winning Roster ==
The winning roster of Crvena Zvezda:

- (Socialist Federal Republic of Yugoslavia) Strahinja Alagić
- (Socialist Federal Republic of Yugoslavia) Milan Bjegojević
- (Socialist Federal Republic of Yugoslavia) Vasilije Stojković
- (Socialist Federal Republic of Yugoslavia) Nebojša Popović
- (Socialist Federal Republic of Yugoslavia) Aleksandar Gec
- (Socialist Federal Republic of Yugoslavia) Milorad Sokolović
- (Socialist Federal Republic of Yugoslavia) Borislav Stanković
- (Socialist Federal Republic of Yugoslavia) Milan Blagojević
- (Socialist Federal Republic of Yugoslavia) Dragan Godžić
- (Socialist Federal Republic of Yugoslavia) Aleksandar Nikolić
- (Socialist Federal Republic of Yugoslavia) Rade Jovanović
- (Socialist Federal Republic of Yugoslavia) Srđan Kalember
- (Socialist Federal Republic of Yugoslavia) Đorđe Lazić
- (Socialist Federal Republic of Yugoslavia) Hristofer Dimitrijević

Coach: (Socialist Federal Republic of Yugoslavia) Nebojša Popović
