= 1955 Yugoslav First Basketball League =

Yugoslav First Basketball League
- Season: 1955
- Games played: 90
- Teams: 12

Regular season
- Top seed: Crvena zvezda

Finals
- Champions: Crvena zvezda (10th title)
- Runners-up: Proleter Zrenjanin
- All statistics correct as of 26 April 2017.

The 1955 Yugoslav First Basketball League season is the 11th season of the Yugoslav First Basketball League, the highest professional basketball league in SFR Yugoslavia.

== Teams ==
(Socialist Republic of Serbia) PR Serbia
- BSK
- Crvena Zvezda
- Partizan
- Proleter Zrenjanin
(Socialist Republic of Croatia) PR Croatia
- Lokomotiva
- Mladost Zagreb
- Montažno
(Socialist Republic of Slovenia) PR Slovenia
- ŽKK Ljubljana
- ŽKK Maribor
- Olimpija

== Regular season ==
=== League table ===
Pos	Teams	Pts	Pld	W	D	L	PF	PA	Champion or relegation
1.	Crvena Zvezda	29	18	14	1	3	1273	1009	Champion
2.	Proleter Zrenjanin	26	18	12	2	4	1299	1071	
3.	Partizan	22	18	10	2	6	1150	1137	
4.	Olimpija	19	18	9	1	8	1067	999	
5.	Ljubljana	19	18	9	1	8	1067	1143	
6.	Lokomotiva	16	18	8	0	10	1059	1070	
7.	Montažno	16	18	8	0	10	1138	1163	
8.	Mladost	16	18	6	4	8	1093	1148	
9.	BSK	15	18	7	1	10	1058	1082	
10.	Maribor	2	18	1	0	17	991	1373	

== Winning Roster ==
The winning roster of Crvena Zvezda:

- (Socialist Federal Republic of Yugoslavia) Đorđe Konjović
- (Socialist Federal Republic of Yugoslavia) Borko Jovanović
- (Socialist Federal Republic of Yugoslavia) Branko Nešić
- (Socialist Federal Republic of Yugoslavia) Ladislav Demšar
- (Socialist Federal Republic of Yugoslavia) Đorđe Andrijašević
- (Socialist Federal Republic of Yugoslavia) Dragan Godžić
- (Socialist Federal Republic of Yugoslavia) Obren Popović
- (Socialist Federal Republic of Yugoslavia) Borislav Ćurčić
- (Socialist Federal Republic of Yugoslavia) Milan Bjegojević
- (Socialist Federal Republic of Yugoslavia) Vojislav Pavasović
- (Socialist Federal Republic of Yugoslavia) Miroljub Čavić
- (Socialist Federal Republic of Yugoslavia) Radivoje Ostojić

Coach: (Socialist Federal Republic of Yugoslavia) Nebojša Popović
