= 1948 Yugoslav First Basketball League =

Yugoslav First Basketball League
- Season: 1948
- Games played: 15
- Teams: 6

Regular season
- Top seed: Crvena zvezda

Finals
- Champions: Crvena zvezda (3rd title)
- Runners-up: Proleter Zrenjanin
- All statistics correct as of 26 April 2017.

The 1948 Yugoslav First Basketball League season is the 4th season of the Yugoslav First Basketball League, the highest professional basketball league in SFR Yugoslavia.

The competition was held as a six-team tournament held in Belgrade.

== Teams ==
(Socialist Republic of Serbia) PR Serbia
- Crvena Zvezda
- Metalac Beograd
- Proleter Zrenjanin
(Socialist Republic of Croatia) PR Croatia
- Jedinstvo
- Mladost Zagreb
(Socialist Republic of Slovenia) PR Slovenia
- Enotnost

== Regular season ==
=== League table ===
Pos	Teams	Pts	Pld	W	L	PF	PA	Champion or relegation
1.	Crvena zvezda	8	5	4	1	229	145	Champion
2.	Proleter Zrenjanin	8	5	4	1	196	156	
3.	Jedinstvo	6	5	3	2	188	182	
4.	Enotnost	4	5	2	3	151	200	
5.	Mladost	2	5	1	4	142	163	
6.	Metalac	2	5	1	4	138	198	

== Winning Roster ==
The winning roster of Crvena Zvezda:

- (Socialist Federal Republic of Yugoslavia) Nebojša Popović
- (Socialist Federal Republic of Yugoslavia) Aleksandar Gec
- (Socialist Federal Republic of Yugoslavia) Milorad Sokolović
- (Socialist Federal Republic of Yugoslavia) Srđan Kalember
- (Socialist Federal Republic of Yugoslavia) Milan Bjegojević
- (Socialist Federal Republic of Yugoslavia) Vasilije Stojković
- (Socialist Federal Republic of Yugoslavia) Dragan Godžić
- (Socialist Federal Republic of Yugoslavia) Ladislav Demšar
- (Socialist Federal Republic of Yugoslavia) Strahinja Alagić
- (Socialist Federal Republic of Yugoslavia) Borislav Stanković
- (Socialist Federal Republic of Yugoslavia) Aleksandar Nikolić
- (Socialist Federal Republic of Yugoslavia) Milan Blagojević
- (Socialist Federal Republic of Yugoslavia) Hristofer Dimitrijević
- (Socialist Federal Republic of Yugoslavia) Rade Jovanović
- (Socialist Federal Republic of Yugoslavia) Đorđe Lazić

Coach: (Socialist Federal Republic of Yugoslavia) Nebojša Popović
