= Obren Popović =

Serbian basketball player

Personal information
- Born: 1934
- Listed height: 1.90 m (6 ft 3 in)

Career information
- Playing career: 1951–1961
- Number: 8

Career history
- 1951–1961: Crvena zvezda

Career highlights
- 3× Yugoslav League champion (1953–1955)

Obren Popović (Serbian Cyrillic: Обрен Поповић) was a Serbian basketball player. He represented the Yugoslavia national basketball team internationally.

== Playing career ==
Popović played for a Belgrade-based team Crvena zvezda of the Yugoslav First League during 1950s. He won 3 Yugoslav Championships.

== National team career ==
Popović was a member of the Yugoslavia national basketball team that participated at the 1955 European Championship in Budapest, Hungary. Over ten tournament games, he averaged 8.1 points per game while shooting 62.2 percent from the field.

== Career achievements and awards ==
- Yugoslav League champion: 3 (with Crvena zvezda: 1953, 1954, 1955).

== See also ==
- List of KK Crvena zvezda players with 100 games played
