= 1953 Yugoslav First Basketball League =

Yugoslav First Basketball League
- Season: 1953
- Games played: 12
- Teams: 4

Regular season
- Top seed: Crvena zvezda

Finals
- Champions: Crvena zvezda (8th title)
- Runners-up: Enotnost
- All statistics correct as of 26 April 2017.

The 1953 Yugoslav First Basketball League season is the 9th season of the Yugoslav First Basketball League, the highest professional basketball league in SFR Yugoslavia.

== Teams ==
(Socialist Republic of Serbia) PR Serbia
- BSK Belgrade
- Crvena Zvezda
- Partizan
- Proleter
(Socialist Republic of Croatia) PR Croatia
- Lokomotiva Zagreb
- Montažno Zagreb
(Socialist Republic of Slovenia) PR Slovenia
- Enotnost
- Železničar Ljubljana

== Regular season ==
=== East ===
Pos	Teams	Pld	W	D	L	PF	PA	Pts	Status
1.	Crvena zvezda	6	5	0	1	375	317	10	Advance to final group
2.	Partizan	6	4	0	2	370	386	8	Advance to final group
3.	BSK Belgrade	6	2	0	4	327	326	4	
4.	Proleter	6	1	0	5	376	419	2	

=== West ===
Pos	Teams	Pld	W	D	L	PF	PA	Pts	Status
1.	Enotnost	6	4	0	2	344	301	10	Advance to final group
2.	Lokomotiva	6	3	1	2	269	270	7	Advance to final group
3.	Železničar Ljubljana	6	2	1	3	287	304	5	
4.	Montažno Zagreb	6	2	0	4	296	321	4	

=== Final group ===
Pos	Teams	Pld	W	D	L	PF	PA	Pts	Champion or relegation
1.	Crvena zvezda	6	5	1	0	380	305	11	Champion
2.	Enotnost	6	3	1	2	331	347	7	
3.	Lokomotiva	6	1	2	3	293	322	4	
4.	Partizan	6	1	0	5	329	359	2	

Source: Partizanopedia

== Winning Roster ==
The winning roster of Crvena zvezda:

- (Socialist Federal Republic of Yugoslavia) Aleksandar Gec
- (Socialist Federal Republic of Yugoslavia) Srđan Kalember
- (Socialist Federal Republic of Yugoslavia) Branko Nešić
- (Socialist Federal Republic of Yugoslavia) Đorđe Konjović
- (Socialist Federal Republic of Yugoslavia) Vojislav Pavasović
- (Socialist Federal Republic of Yugoslavia) Borislav Ćurčić
- (Socialist Federal Republic of Yugoslavia) Ladislav Demšar
- (Socialist Federal Republic of Yugoslavia) Đorđe Andrijašević
- (Socialist Federal Republic of Yugoslavia) Milan Bjegojević
- (Socialist Federal Republic of Yugoslavia) Borko Jovanović
- (Socialist Federal Republic of Yugoslavia) Dragan Godžić
- (Socialist Federal Republic of Yugoslavia) Obren Popović
- (Socialist Federal Republic of Yugoslavia) Rastko Radulović
- (Socialist Federal Republic of Yugoslavia) Milan Radivojević

Coach: (Socialist Federal Republic of Yugoslavia) Nebojša Popović
