= Vasilije Stojković =

Serbian basketball player and football executive

- Василије Стојковић
- Born: 8 January 1923; Belgrade, Kingdom of Serbs, Croats and Slovenes
- Died: 25 June 2008 (aged 85); Belgrade, Serbia
- Other name: Vasa
- Education: University of Belgrade
- Occupations: Basketball player; sports journalist; football executive
- Years active: 1946–1983
- Height: 1.78 m (5 ft 10 in)
- Basketball career

Career information
- Playing career: 1942–1949
- Position: Guard
- Number: 6, 9

Career history
- 1942: BTK
- 1945: Serbia
- 1946–1949: Crvena zvezda

Career highlights
- 4× Yugoslav League champion (1946–1949)
Medals
Men's basketball
Representing Yugoslavia
Balkan and Central Europe Games
Silver medal – second place	1947 Albania	Team
Bronze medal – third place	1946 Romania	Team

Vasilije "Vasa" Stojković (Serbian Cyrillic: Василије Васа Стојковић; January 8, 1923 – June 25, 2008) was a Serbian sports journalist, basketball player and association football executive.

== Sports journalism career ==
Stojkovic has been engaged in sports journalism for more than 25 years. He started to work as journalist in 1946 and worked in the newspapers and magazines: Naš sport (1947–1952; sports journalist), Sport (1952–1962; editor of the football section), Eho (1962–1963, editor-in-chief) and Večernje novosti (1963–1971, editor of sports section). During his career, he reported from 45 countries from four continents, with several world championships and Olympic games.

== Basketball career ==
=== Crvena zvezda ===
Stojković played for Belgrade-based team Crvena zvezda of the Yugoslav First League where he won four Yugoslav Championships.

=== National team career ===
Stojković has played 26 games for the Yugoslavia national team.

== Football executive career ==
Stojković was a secretary-general of the Football Association of Yugoslavia (1971–1977) and a secretary-general of Red Star Belgrade (1980–1983). He was a chief operating officer of the 1973 European Cup Final and the UEFA Euro 1976.

== Career achievements and awards ==
- Yugoslav Basketball League champion: 4 (with Crvena zvezda: 1946, 1947, 1948, 1949)

=== Individual ===
- 1971 May Award
- Golden Charter of Football Association of Yugoslavia
