= Dragan Godžić =

Serbian basketball player and coach

Personal information
- Born: 14 April 1927 Belgrade, Kingdom of SCS
- Died: 23 June 1988 (aged 61) Belgrade, SR Serbia, SFR Yugoslavia

Career information
- NBA draft: 1949: undrafted
- Playing career: 1946–1955
- Number: 9

Career history

Playing
- 1946–1948: Crvena zvezda
- 1947: → Metalac Beograd
- 1950: Železničar Beograd
- 1951–1955: Crvena zvezda

Coaching
- 1947: Železničar Beograd (youth)
- 1961: Crvena zvezda Ladies

Dragan Godžić (Serbian Cyrillic: Драган Гоџић; 14 April 1927 – 23 June 1988) was a Serbian basketball player and coach. He represented the Yugoslavia national basketball team internationally.

Godžić was a member of the first managing board of the Crvena zvezda basketball club.

== Playing career ==
Godžić played for a Belgrade-based team Crvena zvezda of the Yugoslav First League. During the time with Crvena zvezda he won seven Yugoslav Championships.

== National team career ==
Godžić was a member of the Yugoslavia national basketball team that participated at the 1953 European Championship in Moscow, the Soviet Union. Over two tournament games, he averaged two points per game. He was a member of the team at the 1954 FIBA World Championship in Rio de Janeiro, Brazil. Over five tournament games, he averaged 6.8 points per game.

== Career achievements and awards ==
- Yugoslav League champion: 7 (with Crvena zvezda: 1947, 1948, 1951, 1952, 1953, 1954, 1955).
