= 1946 Yugoslav First Basketball League =

Yugoslav First Basketball League
- Season: 1946
- Games played: 28 (Regular season)
- Teams: 8

Finals
- Champions: Crvena zvezda (1st title)
- Runners-up: Zadar

Statistical leaders
Points	(Socialist Federal Republic of Yugoslavia) Ladislav Demšar	9.9
- All statistics correct as of 24 April 2017.

The 1946 Yugoslav First Basketball League season is the second season of the Yugoslav First Basketball League, the highest professional basketball league in SFR Yugoslavia.

The competition was held as an eight-team tournament held in Belgrade.

== Teams ==
(Socialist Republic of Serbia) PR Serbia
- Crvena Zvezda
- Egység Novi Sad
- Partizan
- Metalac Beograd
(Socialist Republic of Croatia) PR Croatia
- Slavija Zagreb
- Zadar
(Socialist Republic of Macedonia) PR Macedonia
- Makedonija
(Socialist Republic of Slovenia) PR Slovenia
- Enotnost

== Regular season ==
=== League table ===
Pos	Teams	Pts	Pld	W	L	PF	PA	Champion or relegation
1.	Crvena Zvezda	12	7	6	1	305	107	Champion
2.	Zadar	10	7	5	2	166	145	
3.	Egység Novi Sad	10	7	5	2	186	194	
4.	Partizan	8	7	4	3	211	106	
5.	Slavija Zagreb	8	7	4	3	142	126	
6.	Metalac	6	7	3	4	107	113	
7.	Enotnost	2	7	1	6	83	206	
8.	Makedonija	0	7	0	7	74	287	

== Winning Roster ==
The winning roster of Crvena Zvezda:

- (Socialist Federal Republic of Yugoslavia) Nebojša Popović
- (Socialist Federal Republic of Yugoslavia) Aleksandar Gec
- (Socialist Federal Republic of Yugoslavia) Borislav Stanković
- (Socialist Federal Republic of Yugoslavia) Relja Mešterović
- (Socialist Federal Republic of Yugoslavia) Vasilije Stojković
- (Socialist Federal Republic of Yugoslavia) Rade Jovanović
- (Socialist Federal Republic of Yugoslavia) Miodrag Stefanović
- (Socialist Federal Republic of Yugoslavia) Tihomir Balubdžić
- (Socialist Federal Republic of Yugoslavia) Srđan Kalember
- (Socialist Federal Republic of Yugoslavia) Ivan Dimić
- (Socialist Federal Republic of Yugoslavia) Vladimir Banjac

Coach: (Socialist Federal Republic of Yugoslavia) Nebojša Popović
