= Đorđe Andrijašević =

Yugoslav basketball player and coach (1931–2025)

Personal information
- Born: 5 May 1931 Kingdom of Yugoslavia
- Died: 6 August 2025 (aged 94)
- Listed height: 1.81 m (5 ft 11 in)

Career information
- NBA draft: 1953: undrafted
- Playing career: 1950–1963
- Position: Guard
- Number: 6
- Coaching career: 1956–1987

Career history

Playing
- 1950–1955: Crvena zvezda
- 1955–1958: Pallacanestro Pavia
- 1962–1963: JA Vichy

Coaching
- 1956–1958: Pallacanestro Pavia
- 1962–1970: JA Vichy
- 1970–1971: Crvena zvezda
- 1974–1976: Caen
- 1977–1986: Olympique Antibes
- 1986–1987: Caen

Career highlights
- As player: 6× Yugoslav League champion (1950–1955); As coach: 2× French Cup winner (1969, 1970); Yugoslav Cup winner (1971)

Đorđe Andrijašević (Serbian Cyrillic: Ђорђе Андријашевић; 5 May 1931 – 6 August 2025), credited as Giorgio Andrijassevic in Italy, was a Serbian professional basketball player and coach. He represented the Yugoslavia national team internationally. He was the first coach to use full-court press technique in Europe.

== Playing career ==
Andrijašević played for Crvena zvezda from 1950 to 1956. During that time he won six Yugoslav Championships.

In July 1950, he was a member of the Zvezda squad that won an international cup tournament in Milan, Italy.

After 1955, he played in Italy and France.

== National team career ==
As a player for the Yugoslavia national team Andrijašević participated in 1954 FIBA World Championship and 1953 and 1955 European Championship. He played 47 games for the national team.

== Coaching career ==
Andrijašević played and coached Pallacanestro Pavia from 1955 to 1958. From 1962 to 1970 he coached the JA Vichy (in 1962–63 as player-coach), winning two French Cups and reaching the finals of the European Cup Winner's Cup in 1970. Andrijašević led Olympique Antibes in second place in the championship and the semifinals at FIBA Korać Cup in 1984.

Andrijašević was the first one to use full-court press technique in Europe. His zone press was an adapted and improved version of Gene Johnson's full-court press. He used it for the first time with French team JA Vichy in 1965.

== Death ==
Andrijašević died on 6 August 2025, at the age of 94.

== Career achievements ==
=== Player ===
- Yugoslav League champion: 6 (with Crvena zvezda: 1950, 1951, 1952, 1953, 1954, 1955).

=== Coach ===
- French Cup winner: 2 (with JA Vichy: 1968–69, 1969–70).
- Yugoslav Cup winner: 1 (with Crvena zvezda: 1970–71).

== See also ==
- List of KK Crvena zvezda players with 100 games played
- List of Red Star Belgrade basketball coaches
