= Nebojša Popović =

Serbian basketball player and coach

Personal information
- Born: 8 February 1923 Irig, Kingdom of Serbs, Croats and Slovenes
- Died: 20 October 2001 (aged 78) Belgrade, FR Yugoslavia

Career information
- Playing career: 1945–1952
- Number: 8, 16
- Coaching career: 1945–1955

Career history

Playing
- 1945–1951: Crvena zvezda
- 1951–1952: Gallaratese

Coaching
- 1945–1955: Crvena zvezda Men
- 1946–1952: Crvena zvezda Women
- 1950–1953: Yugoslavia

Career highlights
- As a player: 6× Yugoslav League champion (1946–1951); As a coach: 10× Yugoslav Men's League champion (1946–1955); 7× Yugoslav Women's League champion (1946–1952); Piva Ivković Award for Lifetime Achievement; FIBA Order of Merit (1997)

Career Yugoslav League statistics
- Points: 518 (8.9 ppg)
- FIBA Hall of Fame
Medals
Men's basketball
Representing Yugoslavia
Balkan and Central Europe Games
Silver medal – second place	1947 Albania	Team
Bronze medal – third place	1946 Romania	Team

Nebojša Popović (Serbian Cyrillic: Небојша Поповић; 8 February 1923 – 20 October 2001) was a Serbian basketball player, coach and administrator. He represented the Yugoslavia national basketball team internationally. He is the basketball legend of Red Star Belgrade. In 2007, he was enshrined as a contributor in the FIBA Hall of Fame.

== Early life ==
Popović lived with his family in Rijeka, where he played water polo as a goalkeeper. He learned about basketball from the Yugoslav water polo and a basketball pioneer Božo Grkinić.

== Basketball career ==
=== Crvena zvezda ===
Popović was a co-founder of the Crvena Zvezda basketball club in 1945. He held number 1 membership card. He played for Crvena Zvezda from 1945 to 1951, he also coached men's team at Red Star from 1945 to 1955 and women's Red Star team from 1946 to 1952. In July 1950, he was a member of the Zvezda squad that won an international cup tournament in Milan, Italy.

Popović played for the Italian team Gallaratese in 1951–1952.

=== Yugoslavia national team ===
As a player for the Yugoslavia national basketball team Popović participated in 1950 World Championship and 1947 European Championship. He scored first point in history of World Championships as player of Yugoslavia.

He coached Yugoslavia national basketball team at the 1950 World Championship and 1953 European Championship.

=== Administrator ===
Popović served as the president of the Yugoslav Basketball Federation (1985–1987) and president of the Commission for International Competition of FIBA.

== Journalism ==
Popović also worked as a journalist, contributing to La Gazzetta dello Sport for four decades.

He was the executive of Yugoslav Radio Television (JRT), the Yugoslav national TV channel. He covered four Summer Olympic Games with JRT.

== Career achievements and awards ==
- Yugoslav Men's League champion: 10 (with Crvena zvezda: 1946, 1947, 1948, 1949, 1950, 1951, 1952, 1953, 1954, 1955) as coach/player until 1951 and as coach only, until 1955.
- Yugoslav Women's League champion: 7 (with Crvena zvezda: 1946, 1947, 1948, 1949, 1950, 1951, 1952)
- FIBA Order of Merit (1997), awarded by the FIBA
- Prize “Sports & Universality”, awarded by the International Olympic Committee

== In popular culture ==
- In 2015 Serbian sports drama We Will Be the World Champions Popović is portrayed by Strahinja Blažić and his wife Maja Bedeković is portrayed by Iva Babić.

== Coaching record ==
Legend
W	Wins	L	Losses	D	Draws	W%	Winning percentage

=== Yugoslav First Men's Basketball League ===
Season	Team	Games	W	D	L	W %	Result
1946	Crvena zvezda	7	6	0	1	.857	Champions
1947	Crvena zvezda	4	4	0	0	1.000	Champions
1948	Crvena zvezda	5	4	0	1	.800	Champions
1949	Crvena zvezda	18	17	0	1	.944	Champions
1950	Crvena zvezda	18	16	0	2	.889	Champions
1951	Crvena zvezda	22	18	2	2	.818	Champions
1952	Crvena zvezda	4	4	0	0	1.000	Champions
1953	Crvena zvezda	6	5	1	0	.833	Champions
1954	Crvena zvezda	22	16	0	6	.727	Champions
1955	Crvena zvezda	18	14	1	3	.778	Champions
Career		124	104	4	16	.839	

=== Yugoslav Women's Basketball League ===
Season	Team	Games	W	D	L	W %	Result
1946	Crvena zvezda	3	3	0	0	1.000	Champions
1947	Crvena zvezda	4	4	0	0	1.000	Champions
1948	Crvena zvezda	5	5	0	0	1.000	Champions
1949	Crvena zvezda	4	4	0	0	1.000	Champions
1950	Crvena zvezda	5	5	0	0	1.000	Champions
1951	Crvena zvezda	10	9	1	0	.900	Champions
1952	Crvena zvezda	3	3	0	0	1.000	Champions
Career		34	33	1	0	.971	

=== National team ===
Tournament	Team	Games	W	L	W %	Result
1950 World Championship	Yugoslavia	5	0	5	.000	10th place
1953 EuroBasket	Yugoslavia	11	6	5	.545	6th place
Career		16	6	10	.375	

== See also ==
- List of Red Star Belgrade basketball coaches
- Borislav Stanković
- Radomir Šaper
- Aleksandar Nikolić

Sporting positions
Preceded by Petar Breznik	President of the Basketball Federation of Yugoslavia; 1987–1989	Succeeded by Miodrag Babić
