= KK Crvena zvezda =

Basketball club in Belgrade, Serbia

Crvena zvezda Meridianbet
- Nickname: Crveno-beli (The Red-Whites)
- Leagues: KLS; ABA League; EuroLeague
- Founded: 4 March 1945; 81 years ago
- History: KK Crvena zvezda (1945–2011); KK Crvena zvezda Beograd (2011–2015); KK Crvena zvezda (2015–present)
- Arena: Belgrade Arena
- Capacity: 18,386
- Location: Belgrade, Serbia
- Team colors: Red, white
- President: Željko Drčelić
- General manager: Milan Tomić
- Team manager: Nebojša Ilić
- Head coach: Ibon Navarro
- Team captain: Ognjen Dobrić
- Affiliations: Radnički Beograd; Youth system Ladies team
- Championships: 1 FIBA Saporta Cup; 7 ABA League; 1 ABA League Supercup; 24 National Championships; 15 National Cups; 1 National Supercup
- Retired numbers: 1 (8)
- Website: kkcrvenazvezda.rs
Home	Away

Košarkaški klub Crvena zvezda (Serbian Cyrillic: Кошаркашки клуб Црвена звезда, transl. Red Star Basketball Club), usually referred to as KK Crvena zvezda or simply Crvena zvezda, currently named Crvena zvezda Meridianbet for sponsorship reasons, is a men's professional basketball club based in Belgrade, Serbia, and the major part of the Red Star multi-sports club. The club is a founding member and shareholder of the Adriatic Basketball Association, and it competes in the Serbian League (KLS), the ABA League, and the continental top-tier EuroLeague.

Crvena zvezda is regarded as one of the most successful clubs in Serbia history; their squads have won 24 National League championships, including 10-in-a-row and 9-in-a-row sequences. They have played in three different National Leagues since 1945, including the Yugoslav First Federal League (1945–1992), the First League of Serbia and Montenegro (1992–2006) and the Serbian League (2006 onwards). They have also won 15 National Cup titles, 7 Adriatic League Championships, one Adriatic Supercup, and one FIBA Saporta Cup. The club plays home matches in the Belgrade Arena. Zvezda's supporters are known as Delije.

The Zvezda's rise to dominance began in their inaugural season by winning the 1946 Yugoslav Championship. FIBA Hall of Fame player-coach Nebojša Popović and Aleksandar Gec, along with a talented supporting cast of future Hall of Famers Aleksandar Nikolić and Borislav Stanković, would lead Crvena zvezda into the greatest period in club history, winning ten consecutive Yugoslav championships in as many seasons throughout the 1940s and early 1950s. After the retirement of Popović in 1956, Zvezda entered a period of rebuilding. Led by forward Vladimir Cvetković and future FIBA Hall of Fame point guard Zoran Slavnić, Zvezda returned to championship caliber, winning two Yugoslav championships in 1969 and 1972. Crvena zvezda won the only European-wide competition in club history, the FIBA European Cup Winner's Cup in 1974. The club struggled throughout the 1980s with a talented cast led by point guard Zoran Radović and FIBA Hall of Fame coach Ranko Žeravica.

Zvezda again returned to dominance in the 1990s following the breakup of Yugoslavia and joining the league with Serbian and Montenegrin clubs. Led by guard Saša Obradović, Crvena zvezda won the 1993 and 1994 championships. The club also won one more title in 1998. After winning 15 championships throughout the 20th century, Zvezda, now competing in the Adriatic and the Serbian League, after struggling through the 2000s, rose again to dominance in the late 2010s. The Crvena zvezda squads won nine consecutive Serbian championships (2015–2024) and seven Adriatic championships in the same nine-year span. (Note: The 2019–20 season in both Adriatic and Serbian league was shortened due to the COVID-19 pandemic, and there were no champions declared.)

Zvezda has a notable rivalry with Partizan. The rivalry started immediately after the creation of the two clubs in 1945 and the two clubs have been dominant in domestic basketball since then. The Partizan legends and future Hall of Fame players Dražen Dalipagić and Vlade Divac had their stints with Zvezda in the 1990s.

Crvena zvezda is the only club in the world to have produced two members now in the Hall of Fame (Stanković and Nikolić) and four in the FIBA Hall of Fame (Stanković, Popović, Radomir Šaper, and Nikolić). The four of them have the highest Order of Merit from FIBA.

== History ==
=== 1945–1968: Early years and ten consecutive championship titles ===
The club was founded on 4 March 1945, as a basketball section of the Crvena zvezda Sports Society. By winning the first of ten consecutive championship titles after the Second World War, the golden age of Crvena zvezda began. No domestic national selection could be imagined without seven or eight Zvezda's players and the first five featured Nebojša Popović, Tullio Rochlitzer, Aleksandar Gec, Ladislav Demšar, and Srđan Kalember. They first played in an open-air court at the Kalemegdan fortress.

=== 1968–1972: Return to success ===
That long-awaited eleventh title was won in the 1968–69 season, when Crvena zvezda won all six games against Jugoplastika, Zadar and Partizan, therefore proving to be better than all three fierce rivals. Led by Vladimir Cvetković, the title was won by Dragan Kapičić, Zoran Lazarević, Ivan Sarjanović, Ljubodrag Simonović, Srđan Škulić, Zoran Slavnić, Tihomir Pavlović, Nemanja Đurić, Miroslav Todosijević, Dragiša Vučinić and Dubravko Kapetanović. At that time, they were the youngest championship-winning team in Yugoslavian basketball. The twelfth title was won in the 1971–72 season. In the 1970s the club won the Yugoslav Cup three times, and most of the work in those years was done by Slavnić, Simonović, Kapičić, Vučinić, and Živković. This generation of players won two national championships and three national cups.

=== 1972–1990: Continental competitions ===
Crvena zvezda also had significant international success, having played in five continental cup finals so far. They lost the first European Cup Winners' Cup finals to Italian powerhouse Simmenthal Milano in 1972 by a score of 70–74. Then, in 1974, they defeated Spartak ZJŠ Brno from Czechoslovakia by a score of 86–75. This team's third finals in the European Cup Winners' Cup were lost to Spartak Leningrad by a score of 62–63 in 1975. In the club's first Korać Cup finals, in Paris in 1984, the French Orthez won by a score of 97–73. In the Korać Cup second finals in 1998, Zvezda played two matches with Rielo Mash Verona from Italy; they won the away match, 74–68, but lost at home, 64–73. With the total score being 138–141, they did not win the trophy.

=== 1990–2002: Another comeback ===
The 1990s started promisingly. Throughout the 1991–92 season, which was the last one in Yugoslavia, Crvena zvezda played some inspired basketball, reaching the play-off finals versus arch-rival Partizan that coached by Željko Obradović won the EuroLeague that season. In a twist of fate, Crvena zvezda was led that season by the legendary Partizan coach Duško Vujošević. Though they lost the finals series, the young Crveno-beli team showed plenty of promise. The thirteenth championship title was won after a gap of no less than 21 years, in 1993. In the fifth match of the play-off finals, Crvena zvezda beat fierce rivals and Pionir Hall co-tenants Partizan. The players who won that championship title are: Saša Obradović, Nebojša Ilić, Zoran Jovanović, Mile Marinković, Nikola Jovanović, Mileta Lisica, Dejan Tomašević, Dragoljub Vidačić, Aleksandar Trifunović, Rastko Cvetković, Slobodan Kaličanin, Predrag Stojaković and Srđan Jovanović. In the next season, Crvena zvezda won its fourteenth national championship title. In the play-off finals, Partizan was beaten by 4–1 overall. The Zvezda won the championship for the fifteenth time in 1998. The main star of that team was without any doubt Yugoslavian national team power forward Milenko Topić, and other influential players were Igor Rakočević, Oliver Popović, and Zlatko Bolić.

=== 2002–2011: "European Red Star" project, struggles ===
In the early part of 2002, the club got complete new management. Individuals from the political and business milieu close to ruling Democratic Party, such as Živorad Anđelković, Goran Vesić, and Igor Žeželj, took over key positions in the club.

From summer 2002 onward, the project called Evropska Zvezda (The European Red Star) was thought up in order to slowly and methodically return the club on the path of its former glory by achieving results that would see the club play EuroLeague again. To that end, new management hired Slovenian coach Zmago Sagadin who became the Zvezda's organizational centerpiece. In his first season, Sagadin did not actually coach the team (the formal head coach role was given to Aleksandar Trifunović), but he did make all the important personnel decisions from the role of a sporting director. Under Sagadin's guidance, Crvena zvezda entered the Adriatic League (a privately owned regional competition in which he holds ownership stake) for the 2002–03 season. In August 2003, ahead of the 2003–04 season, Sagadin took over the coaching duties formally as well. Despite all the efforts, the club did not manage to win any major trophies in this period, and in November 2004 Sagadin got fired.

In the next couple of years the club struggled to get back on a winning streak, and only managed to win the 2004 and 2006 national cup (Radivoj Korać Cup) finals. The first of them was held in Novi Sad, where Crvena zvezda beat the National Champion Partizan, then the host Vojvodina and, finally, FMP Železnik. All three matches were won in overtime, which is something to remember, especially when it is known that those matches were played without some of the best players, including the team captain Igor Rakočević who missed the final match. Besides Rakočević, the cup was won by Goran Jeretin, Vuk Radivojević, Milan Dozet, Miloš Mirković, Norman Richardson, Milko Bjelica, Aleksandar Đurić, Vladislav Dragojlović, Luka Bogdanović, Čedomir Vitkovac and Aleksej Nešović. The 2006 cup was won in Belgrade when Crvena zvezda won superiorly against Hemofarm Vršac by 80–65. The team was coached by Dragan Šakota and featured the likes of Goran Jeretin, Milan Gurović, Gerrod Henderson, Miroslav Raičević, Larry O'Bannon, Igor Milošević, Vujadin Subotić, Nenad Mišanović, Vladislav Dragojlović, Čedomir Vitkovac, Vuk Radivojević and Pero Antić.

With the failure of the project "European Red Star" in 2008, Slobodan Vučićević became the president of Crvena zvezda and brought new life into the club. Svetislav Pešić became the head coach, and a new team was assembled, including some notable players such as Nemanja Bjelica, Marko Kešelj, Vladimir Štimac, Andre Owens, Lawrence Roberts but the club failed to win a trophy that year, and at the end of the season, both Slobodan Vučićević and Svetislav Pešić left the club.

In the following two seasons, the club experienced a decline and financial problems, which culminated in the 2010–11 season when the club had a budget of only 500.000 euros. Crvena zvezda finished 13th in the Adriatic League, and 5th in the Serbian league, failing to qualify for the Adriatic League the following season.

=== 2011–2017: New era of success and Radonjić's titles ===
A huge debt of 15 million euros threatened the very existence of the club. The club was saved from bankruptcy when Nebojša Čović became president of KK Crvena zvezda, merging them with KK FMP. He prepared a plan for financial reorganization. In the first year of his presidency, Svetislav Pešić became a head coach for the second time. Even though the season was without success in the Adriatic League, Pešić managed to bring his team to the finals, eventually losing to a much stronger Partizan team 3–1 in the series. Pešić left the club at the end of the season, and his assistant Milivoje Lazić became the new head coach. Crvena zvezda had big ambitions for the 2012–13 season, bringing back Igor Rakočević for the 3rd time, and signing players such as DeMarcus Nelson, Elton Brown and Boris Savović. But Lazić was fired after only 2 games in the season after losing the games against KK Zadar and KK Split, and Vlada Vukoičić was brought in to replace him. Vukoičić managed to win the Serbian cup and managed to advance to the Last 16 EuroCup stage, but he was sacked as well after a very bad start in the domestic league. Dejan Radonjić replaced him, but he was unable to win the Adriatic League and the Serbian League, losing to Partizan in both finals.

The season of 2013–14 was a historic one for the club, as Crvena zvezda was back in the EuroLeague after 15 years. The club had a very successful season in the European competitions, led by the new signings Charles Jenkins, Blake Schilb, Jaka Blažič and Boban Marjanović and had a record of 4–6 in the group stage of the EuroLeague. This was not enough to advance to the knockout phase, but the team did reach the semifinals of the EuroCup. Crvena zvezda was eventually eliminated in the semifinals of the Adriatic league, losing to Cibona, and failed to win the domestic title yet again, losing to Partizan in a series which will be remembered more by incidents and a brawl in game 1.

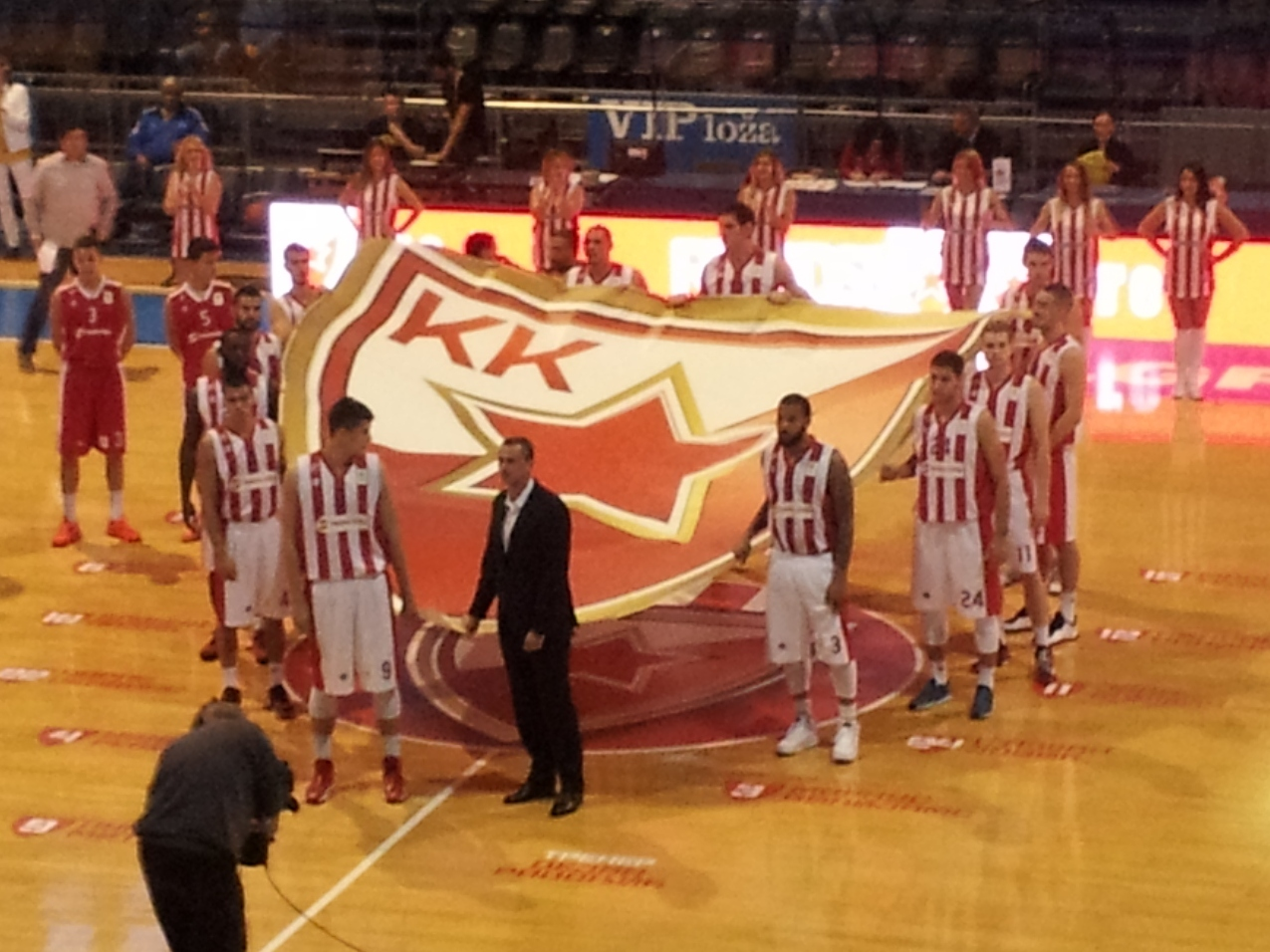
Team for the 2014–15 season

In the summer of 2014, Crvena zvezda signed Nikola Kalinić and Stefan Jović from Radnički Kragujevac, NBA prospect Nemanja Dangubić, center Maik Zirbes and finalized a huge signing of point guard Marcus Williams. In season 2014–15, the club participated in EuroLeague, winning 6 out of 10 games in regular season, reaching Top 16 and seeing its average home attendance rising to 14483. In the Adriatic league, it set a new record of 20 consecutive victories, ending league competition with score 24–2, losing only to Krka and Partizan. In the playoffs, Zvezda triumphed over Partizan 3–1 in the semifinals, and 3–1 over Cedevita Zagreb in the finals, winning its first trophy in this competition and securing a place in Euroleague in the 2015–2016 season. Zvezda also won Radivoj Korać Cup for the third time in a row. In Basketball League of Serbia, Zvezda entered playoffs with 13 wins and only one lost game. In the semifinals, it defeated Mega Leks 2–0, and in the final triumphed over great rival Partizan, 3–0.

The team started preparing for the 2015–16 season by re-signing coach Radonjić and guard Branko Lazić for two years each. Team captain Luka Mitrović extended his contract until summer 2017. Williams, Marjanović, Kalinić, Jenkins, and Blažič left the club, and the roster was reinforced by Sofoklis Schortsanitis, Stefan Nastić, Ryan Thompson and Gal Mekel. From its development team FMP, Zvezda promoted MVP of 2015 FIBA Europe Under-20 Championship, Marko Gudurić. The first part of the season was marked by mixed results and a lot of squad changes. Due to serious injuries of Mitrović and Dangubić, the club brought back Marko Simonović, and later on, landed Quincy Miller. Out-of-form Schortsanitis and Mekel were replaced by Vladimir Štimac and returning Marcus Williams. Mid-season, the club also released Williams and Thompson, replacing them with Vasilije Micić and Tarence Kinsey. Results improved, and Crvena zvezda ended group stage of EuroLeague with a 5–5 score, reaching the third place of Group A, qualifying for Top 16 stage. Successful European season continued as Zvezda ended fourth in Top 16 Group E, with a score of 7 wins and seven losses. In the playoffs, it was stopped by CSKA Moscow, who eventually went on to lift EuroLeague trophy. In ABA league, Zvezda entered playoffs from the second position, facing another EuroLeague team – Cedevita – and, defeating them twice, advanced to final series. In the finals, Zvezda pulled a 3–0 against Mega Leks, defending the ABA league title. Zvezda ended another spectacular season by defending the Serbian league title beating Partizan 3–1 in the finals.

The 2016–17 season saw the Zvezda parting ways with its two-star players, Zirbes and Miller, as well as Kinsey, Štimac and Micić. During the pre-season, the club signed Ognjen Kuzmić, Milko Bjelica and Charles Jenkins, brought talented Petar Rakićević and promoted Ognjen Dobrić from its development team. When the season already began, the club brought on Nate Wolters who was waived by Detroit Pistons. Squad was finally completed mid-season, with the addition of Deon Thompson to the roster. Building on previous years tactics, Zvezda's trademark became its strong, aggressive defense, pressure on the ball, intercepting passes, steals and resulting fast breaks. In January 2017, coach Dejan Radonjić achieved his 200th victory leading Zvezda. He also brought another Radivoj Korać Cup to the team. Zvezda has ended the regular ABA league season with 25 wins on their record while losing only once, which was the best regular-season record made by any team in the history of the regional competition so far. Team narrowly stayed out of Top 8, ending up on 9th place, having the same number of victories as 8th placed Darussafaka, but having worse head-to-head record. However, it decisively defended ABA league trophy, defeating Budućnost (2-1) and Cedevita (3-0) on its way. In the domestic championship, Zvezda ended league part with the score of 13–1, defeated Mega Leks (2-0) and FMP (3-0) in the playoffs, and lifted another trophy.

=== 2017–2020: Continuing success ===
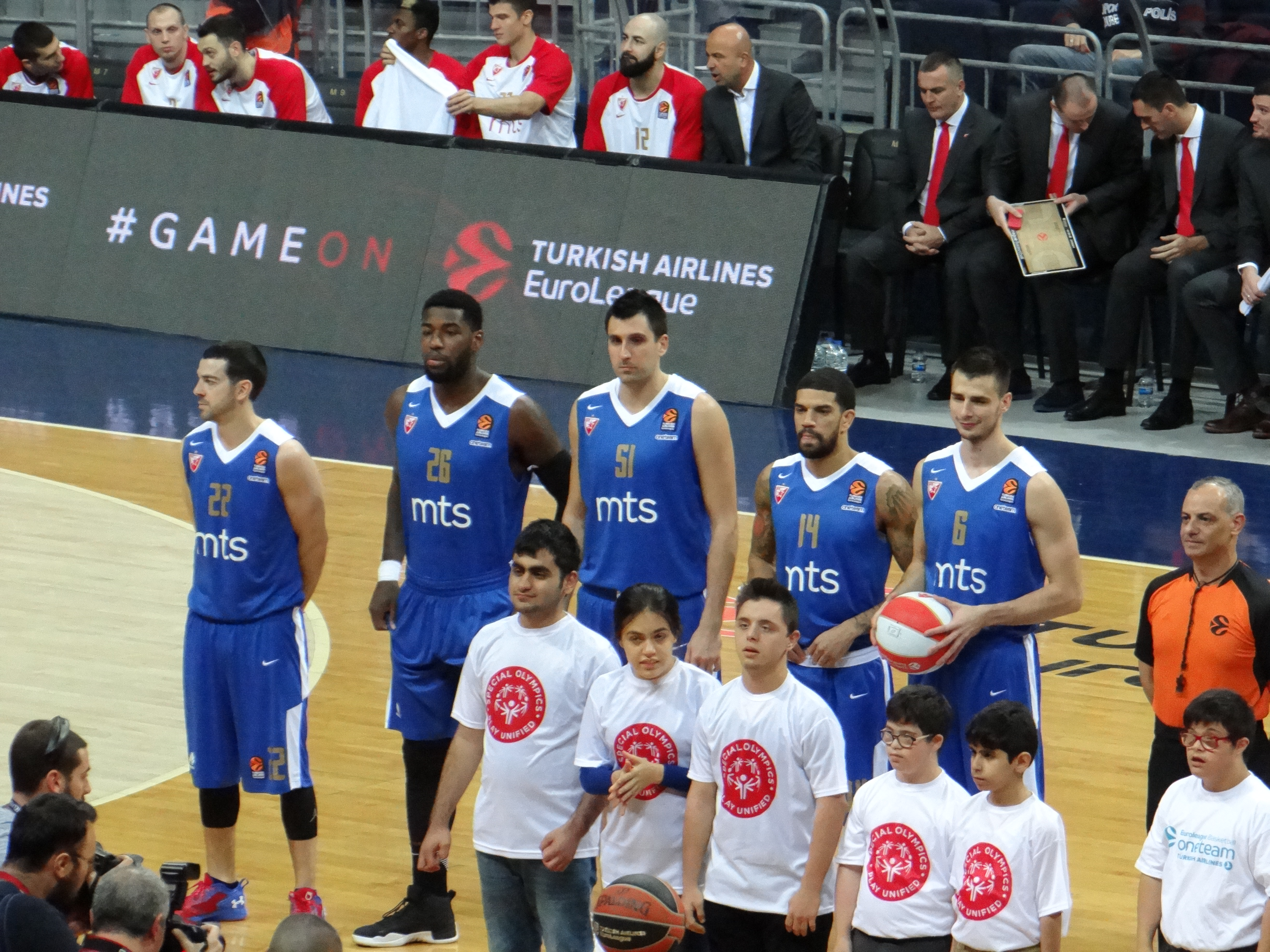
2017–18 roster

During the summer of 2017, the head coach Radonjić did not sign a new contract, and the club parted ways with no less than eleven players, including key figures in the last couple of years such as Simonović, captain Mitrović, Jenkins, Jović, Kuzmić, and Gudurić. Young prospect Dušan Alimpijević was named as the head coach. Depleted roster was reinforced by James Feldeine and Taylor Rochestie, veterans Pero Antić and Marko Kešelj and a quartet of young players: Mathias Lessort, Nikola Radičević, Stefan Janković and Nikola Jovanović. Zvezda also brought in Dragan Apić, Dejan Davidovac and Stefan Lazarević from its development team FMP. Half of the rebuilt team has not previously played a single game in EuroLeague. Breaking with defense-oriented philosophy of Radonjić era, the staple of the Zvezda's game became 3 point shot. In December 2017, the roster was further strengthened with combo guard Dylan Ennis, while Apić and Lazarević got loaned back to FMP. The last player to arrive was Slovenian national team center Alen Omić, while underperforming Radičević parted ways with the club. Zvezda finished first in the regular part of ABA League, having 19 wins and 3 losses, and reached finals by defeating Mornar 2–1 in series, but lost 3–1 in final series to Budućnost. The defeat meant that the club will not participate in EuroLeague next year, which triggered downsizing. Management terminated contract with Dylan Ennis and Milko Bjelica, and reinforced squad with Filip Čović and young prospect Aleksa Radanov from FMP. Poor start in domestic KLS forced coach Alimpijević to resign, and his assistant Milenko Topić took over as interim head coach. The modified team managed to win the Superleague title, beating FMP in the finals, but the season was generally deemed to be unsuccessful due to failure to secure a spot in Euroleague.

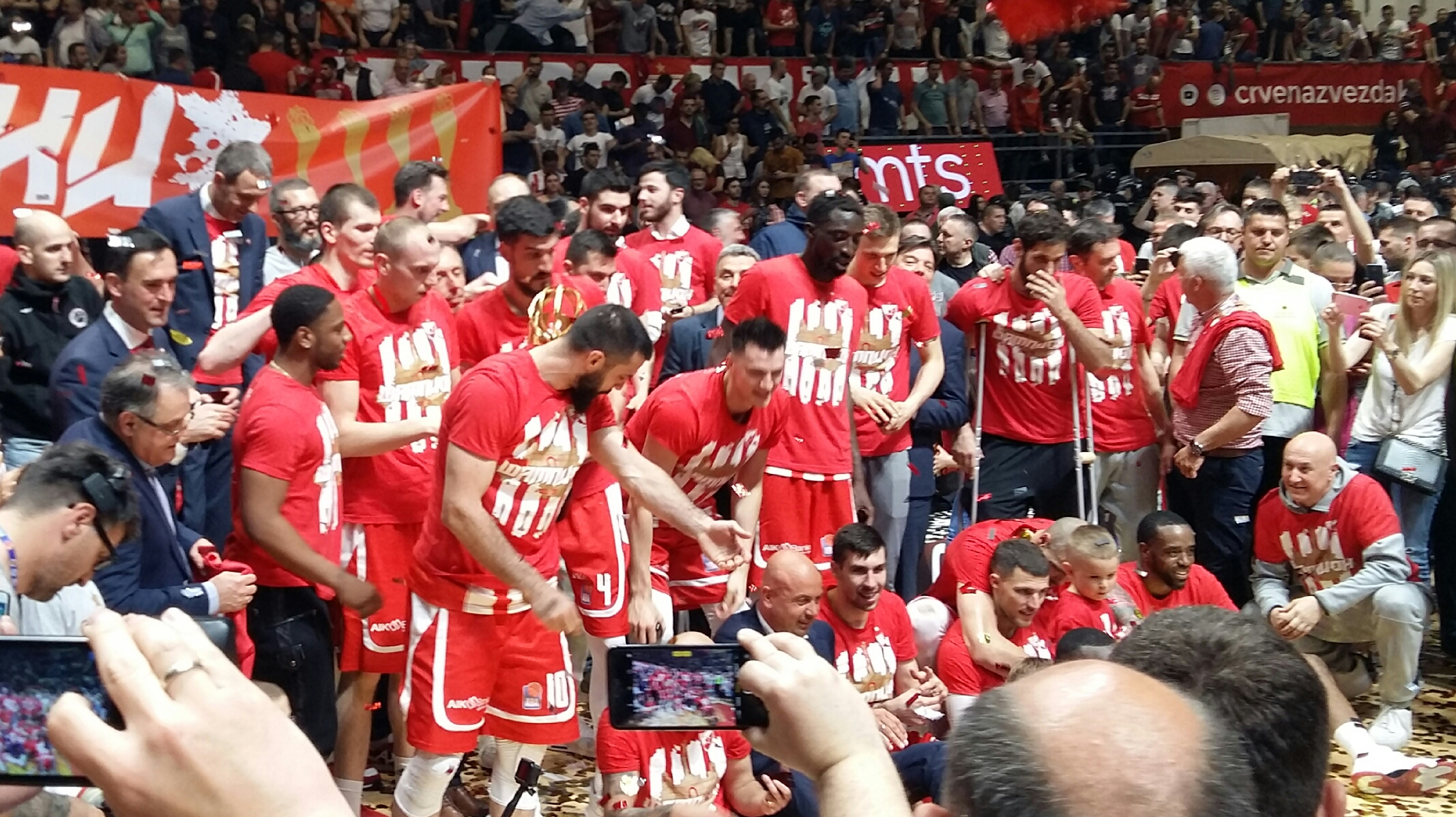
Players celebrating the 2018–19 ABA League title

Squad rebuilding prior to the 2018–19 season started with signing Milan Tomić as a head coach. Soon to follow were the players Billy Baron, Michael Ojo and two centers from Radonjić era: Maik Zirbes and Dušan Ristić. The Zvezda also added experienced Stratos Perperoglou and Mouhammad Faye, as well as point guard Joe Ragland. The last one to sign was combo guard Nemanja Nenadić from the development team FMP. Zvezda started season well, convincingly winning ABA League Super Cup tournament by beating last season champion Budućnost in the final game. Tomić struck a great balance between hard defense and versatile offense, causing team to grab the first spot at the beginning of ABA League, as well as EuroCup Group A. Bad streak in the EuroCup during November, caused Zvezda to finish the group phase on the third spot, which was still good enough for it to advance to the next stage. In the ABA League, the Zvezda ended the first part of the season with 11–0, having defeated every opponent in the league. Zvezda ended the 2018-19 EuroCup season in Top 16 stage, reaching third out of four places in group G. Mid-February roster was strengthened by signing experienced guard K. C. Rivers. Zvezda entered ABA playoffs from the first position, having 21 win and one loss. In semifinals, Zvezda eliminated Partizan 2-1 despite losing starting playmaker Ragland at the beginning of match one due to a knee injury. In the finals, Zvezda clashed with last year's champions KK Budućnost and defeated them 3–2 in series, despite playing without injured Perperoglou in the last three matches. In the Serbian Super League, the Zvezda won all 10 league games, downed Mega Bemax in playoffs semifinals 2–0, and triumphed over Partizan in final series 3–1.

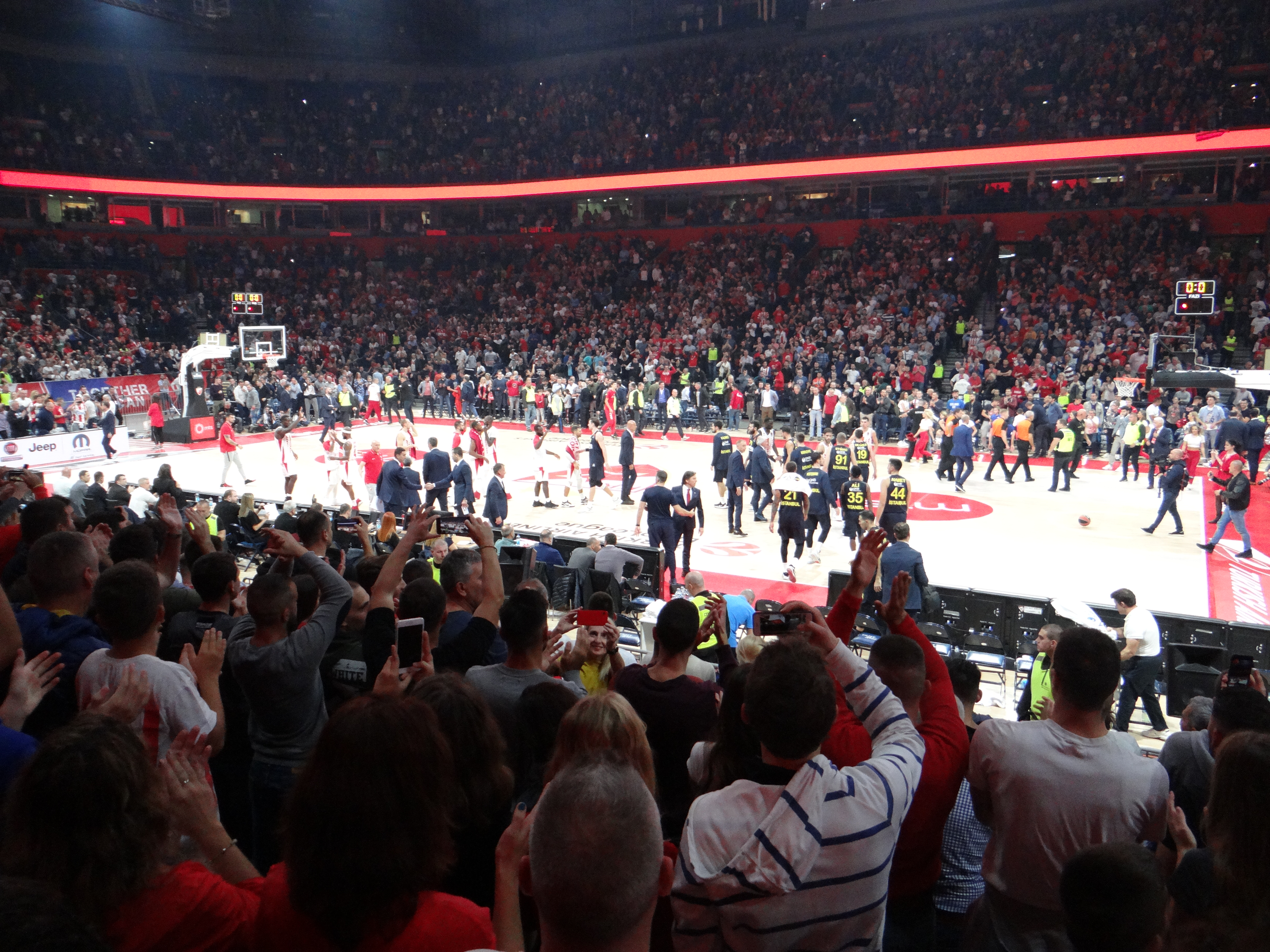
Home game in the 2019–20 season

Prior to the 2019–20 season, the club extended contracts with Baron, Čović, Dobrić, Faye, Lazić, Boriša Simanić, and Perperoglou, brought back Jenkins and Kuzmić, as well as signed Derrick Brown, James Gist and Lorenzo Brown. Zvezda entered season poorly, getting relegated from ABA Supercup in the first match, losing 2 out of 3 games in ABA and having the same score in Euroleague. Coach Milan Tomić resigned less than a month after the season kicked off, leaving assistant Andrija Gavrilović, who never held a head coach position before, as an interim solution. Gavrilović failed to make any notable progress, which added to the bad atmosphere around the club. Upset by his poor performances, Zvezda fans started booing Filip Čović. Club management reacted at the end of December, hiring Dragan Šakota as a coach and reinforcing squad with Vladimir Štimac and Kevin Punter. Derrick Brown and Mo Faye agreed with the club to terminate their contracts in January. Mid-February Zvezda transferred Čović and Kuzmić to FMP, bringing in Kalin Lucas instead. An outbreak of COVID-19 pandemic brought EuroLeague and ABA seasons to a standstill mid-March. At that point, the Zvezda held 3rd position in ABA with one round left to be played, and the 14th position in EuroLeague, with six rounds remaining. Both competitions ended without a champion, and EuroLeague decided to stick with the same clubs in the next season.

=== 2020–2022: Two triple crowns with Radonjić ===
The Zvezda entered the 2020–21 season hiring club's legend Saša Obradović as the new head coach. The club started building the new squad by signing Jordan Loyd, Corey Walden, Langston Hall and Emanuel Terry. Aleksa Radanov, Aleksa Uskoković and Duop Reath got promoted from the development team. Soon after the season start, Zvezda signed Taylor Rochestie on a short-term contract and completed a huge signing of Johnny O'Bryant. However, the team performed below expectations, winning only 5 out of 16 games in Euroleague opening stages and losing in ABA to another title contender KK Budućnost, so coach Obradović and the club decided to part ways. Obradović was replaced by Dejan Radonjić, Zvezda's all-time leader in both regular-season games coached and wins. The club also parted ways with Rochestie and Emanuel Terry and reinforced the squad with Quino Colom and Landry Nnoko. Despite missing five important players due to COVID-19, Zvezda won the Serbian national cup. It was the 10th Radonjić's trophy on Zvezda helm. Right after the cup tournament, Zvezda parted ways with O'Bryant. Soon to follow were departures of Simanić and Colom, as the coach was seeking a way to trim down the roster. Zvezda finished regular part of the ABA league in the first place, with 23 wins and 3 losses. The semifinals duel with KK Igokea was won 2–1 despite struggling with injury problems, most notably the starting playmaker Walden. In the finals, Zvezda triumphed against Budućnost with 3–2 in series, relying once again on Radonjić's trademark aggressive defense. In the Serbian Super League, Zvezda put on a dominant performance on its road to finals, beating in process KK Zlatibor and KK Borac Čačak. In the final series, Zvezda defeated Mega Soccerbet 2–1, despite Walden missing all the games due to back injury and Loyd getting injured in game 1 and missing games 2 and 3. This was the third triple crown under coach Radonjić, and the third one in club's history.

For the 2021–22 season, the club focused on keeping its domestic players base and expanding it by re-signing five of Zvezda's former players: Luka Mitrović, Nate Wolters, Stefan Lazarević, Maik Zirbes and most importantly Nikola Kalinić. Zvezda also added experienced Aaron White and Austin Hollins, as well as the former key player of its rival Budućnost, Nikola Ivanović. Once again putting a heavy emphasis on defense and transition, Zvezda won MagentaSport Cup preseason tournament by beating Panathinaikos and home side Bayern, but Aaron White suffered a broken arm. In November, Zvezda added former Serbia national team point guard Stefan Marković. In February Zvezda won the Serbian national cup, triumphing decisively in the final game over Partizan led by Željko Obradović. The club ended its Euroleague season sharing 9th spot with Baskonia and Alba, having 12 wins and 14 defeats. It also finished regular part of the ABA league in the first place, with 24 wins and 2 losses, securing home court advantage in the playoffs. Zvezda defeated Cedevita Olimpija 2–1 in the semifinals, and triumphed over Partizan 3–2 in the final series, lifting its 6th ABA league trophy. In Serbian Super League playoff, Zvezda knocked out Mega Mozzart (2–1) and defeated FMP in the finals (2–0), completing the fourth triple crown in its history, and fourth under the same coach.

=== 2022–present: Post-Radonjić period ===
In the summer of 2022, coach Radonjić decided not to extend the contract with Zvezda. Several key players from the past season followed suit and left the club as well: Kalinić, Wolters, Hollins, Davidovac. Zvezda hired head coach of the Serbia national under-20 team, Vladimir Jovanović. He started building a new squad by signing Zvezda's former star Nemanja Nedović, Ben Bentil, Jaylen Adams and Hassan Martin, added depth with veterans John Holland and Miroslav Raduljica, as well as young Serbian prospects Filip Petrušev and Dalibor Ilić. In October the club completed a major transfer by bringing in Luca Vildoza, and reached a mutual agreement to terminate the contract of underperforming Jaylen Adams. After a poor start in Euroleague (1–6) and an upset loss on a home court to Zadar in ABA league, Zvezda replaced coach Jovanović with Duško Ivanović. Ivanović made an immediate impact with 10 games won in a row, 6 of which in Euroleague. Late in December, Zvezda signed Facundo Campazzo, but was prevented to register him to play the Euroleague until March due to a ban. On-form Vildoza was chosen as the Euroleague MVP for December In February Zvezda won the Serbian national cup, beating Borac, Partizan and Mega in process. It was the first trophy Zvezda won under Duško Ivanović. The club ended Euroleague season in 10th position, with 17 victories and 17 losses. In June, it won its 23rd national title by defeating FMP in the final series, but lost ABA final series against Partizan, 3-2.

In line with previous seasons, the club was not able to keep its key players. Campazzo, Vildoza and Petrušev left, along with Dobrić, Nikola Ivanović, Holland, Martin, Bentil and Raduljica, while Stefan Marković retired. Uncharacteristically, Zvezda built a new squad early by bringing in no less than nine new players: Miloš Teodosić, Shabazz Napier, Joel Bolomboy, Mike Tobey, Ádám Hanga, Rokas Giedraitis, Yago dos Santos, Marko Simonović and Dejan Davidovac. On 21 October, club announced that they have parted ways with head coach Duško Ivanović after slow Euroleague start of one win and four defeats. He was the head coach of the club since November 2022, and during his tenure club won Serbian League and Serbian Cup titles. On the next day, the club hired Greek coach Ioannis Sfairopoulos as their new head coach. The results continued to suffer due to a string of injuries, as well as underperformance of Shabazz Napier as a key player, which led to a mutual termination of his contract. The club also parted ways with Ognjen Kuzmić and Marko Simonović, and brought in Freddie Gillespie and a rising young star Nikola Topić. Unfortunately, Topić got injured after only three games in Zvezda jersey, so the club had to reinforce its depleted roster by signing Javonte Smart and adding a recovering veteran Trey Thompkins. Injury-riddled Zvezda managed to win another national cup in February by defeating Partizan in the final game, but kept underperforming in Euroleague, ending its campaign in 16th spot. In ABA league, however, Zvezda secured the first place in the regular season, entering the playoffs with home court advantage. In the playoffs, Zvezda eliminated SC Derby (2-0), Mega Basket (2-0) and Partizan (3-0), winning its second trophy of the season. Zvezda finished the season by winning Serbian league, beating KK FMP 2–0 in semifinals and KK Partizan 2–0 in the finals. The second game of the finals ended with Crvena Zvezda taking a 20-0 following the Game 2 suspension. Finals MVP award was given to Dejan Davidovac.

Building squad for the season 2024/2025 began with extending contracts for a number of players: Giedraitis and Lazić signed for 2 more years, Teodosić for one additional season, while Bolomboy signed 2-year extension back in January. New reinforcements were the club icon Nikola Kalinić, Codi Miller-McIntyre, Isaiah Canaan, Ognjen Dobrić, Mike Daum and Uroš Plavšić. Zvezda started the season with mixed results, losing two early games in the ABA League but performing strongly in the EuroLeague. The team's best-performing player, Joel Bolomboy, suffered an injury in late October, prompting the club to sign Filip Petrušev. In December, they further strengthened the roster by bringing in John Brown III. On January 7, Zvezda extended coach Sfairopoulos' contract, securing his services through the end of the 2026/2027 season. On February 15, Zvezda won the national cup by beating Partizan in overtime of the final game. Filip Petrušev became tournament MVP. Zvezda played well throughout the year and finished the EuroLeague regular season with a 18-16 record - qualifying for a Play-In game against FC Bayern Munich. In a one-off game in Munich, Bayern beat Zvezda. The rest of the season became a complete nightmare for Zvezda - Zvezda finished only fourth in the ABA standings, and defeated Igokea m:tel 2–0 in a tough quarterfinal matchup. In the semifinals, Zvezda faced old rival Budućnost VOLI, who finished first in the ABA league standings - the two teams split the series with two blowout wins, before a deciding clash in Podgorica - even throughout, Zvezda was still considered the heavy favorites of the competition. However, Budućnost shocked Zvezda with a buzzer-beating 81-78 victory and eliminated Zvezda 2-1 from the competition - the worst finish by Zvezda in the ABA league since 2014. In the Basketball League of Serbia, Zvezda again were considered the easy favorites, coming in winning the league nine consecutive times - a record. Partizan finished above Zvezda in the standings, with both teams qualifying for the semifinals with a bye. In the semifinals, Zvezda suffered one of the most embarrassing losses in club history when KK Spartak Subotica beat Zvezda 2–0 in the semifinals, winning both in Belgrade and Subotica, ending the long win streak of winning the Serbian league for Zvezda.

Before the 2025/2026 season, Zvezda started a roster rebuild, assembling a younger, more athletic squad. The first signing was Baskonia's star Chima Moneke, followed by Ebuka Izundu, Semi Ojeleye, Stefan Miljenović, Uroš Plavšić (back from loan to Besiktas), Tyson Carter, Jordan Nwora, Ognjen Radošić, Jasiel Rivero and Devonte' Graham. Slow start and a number of injuries affected results early on, leading to terminating contract with coach Ioannis Sfairopoulos, who was replaced by Saša Obradović in his second stint in Zvezda as a coach. Obradović made an instant impact, helping team to 7 consecutive wins in Euroleague. During October, injury-depleted roster was reinforced with veteran center Donatas Motiejūnas and NBA signing Jared Butler. The team developed aggressive, high-tempo game focused on efficient transition offense, controlling rebounds, aggressive perimeter pressure in defense and versatile switching. On February 21, Zvezda won the Serbian cup for the sixth time in a row. Jordan Nwora became tournament MVP.

== Rivalries ==
=== Partizan Belgrade ===
The rivalry between Crvena zvezda and Partizan involves the two biggest and most storied basketball clubs in Serbia.

The two Belgrade-based clubs have won the two highest numbers of national titles in Serbia: Crvena zvezda have won 24, two more than Partizan. Together, they account for 17 of the 48 national titles in Yugoslavia (1945–1992), 11 of 14 national titles in Serbia and Montenegro (1992–2006), and all but one of the national titles in Serbia (2006 onwards). Also, the two clubs have won the two highest numbers of championships in the Adriatic League. Together, they account for 15 of 24 championships.

=== Budućnost Podgorica ===
The rivalry between Budućnost and Crvena zvezda is an Adriatic League (ABA League) rivalry. While the two teams have played each other since Budućnost joined the Yugoslav First Basketball League in 1980, their rivalry began to develop in the 1990s through the Serbian-Montenegrin League and reached its peak in the Adriatic League during the late 2010s and early 2020s with 3-in-a-row League Finals (2018, 2019, and 2021).

== Identity ==
The main colors of Crvena zvezda, since its foundation, are red and white. The crest is a red five-pointed star, white and gold framed, on a red-white shield. In addition, the whole crest is framed with gold color. There are two golden stars on the top of their emblem, symbolizing the 20 national titles won. The typical kit of the team is a shirt with red and white vertical stripes and red or white shorts. Crvena zvezda used also as away kit or third kit, an all-blue jersey, but very rarely, so that the club used all the colors of the Serbian flag.

=== Sponsors and manufacturers ===
Since 1979, Crvena zvezda has a specific kit manufacturer and a kit sponsor. The following table details the shirt sponsors and kit suppliers by year:

Period	Kit supplier	Shirt sponsor
1979–1982	Sport	–
1982–1985	Speedo	–
1986–1990	Sport	–
1990–1992	Dribling	–
1992–1993	Reebok	–
1993–1995	ASICS	–
1995–2000	Nike	–
2000–2003	Rang	–
2003–2004	AND1	Beopetrol
2004–2006	AND1	Aqua Viva
2006–2008	AND1	Telekom Srbija
2008–2009	AND1	Cockta
2009–2010	AND1	Banca Intesa; Dijamant
2010–2011	Anta	–
2011–2013	Adidas	LUKOIL
2013–2016	Champion	Telekom Srbija
2016–2017	Champion	mts
2017–2020	Nike	mts
2020–2022	Adidas	mts
2023–	Adidas	Meridian

== Sponsorship naming ==
Crvena zvezda has had several denominations through the years due to its sponsorship:

- Crvena zvezda Diva: 2012
- Crvena zvezda Telekom: 2012–2016
- Crvena zvezda mts: 2016–2022
- Crvena zvezda Meridianbet: 2023–present

== Home arenas ==
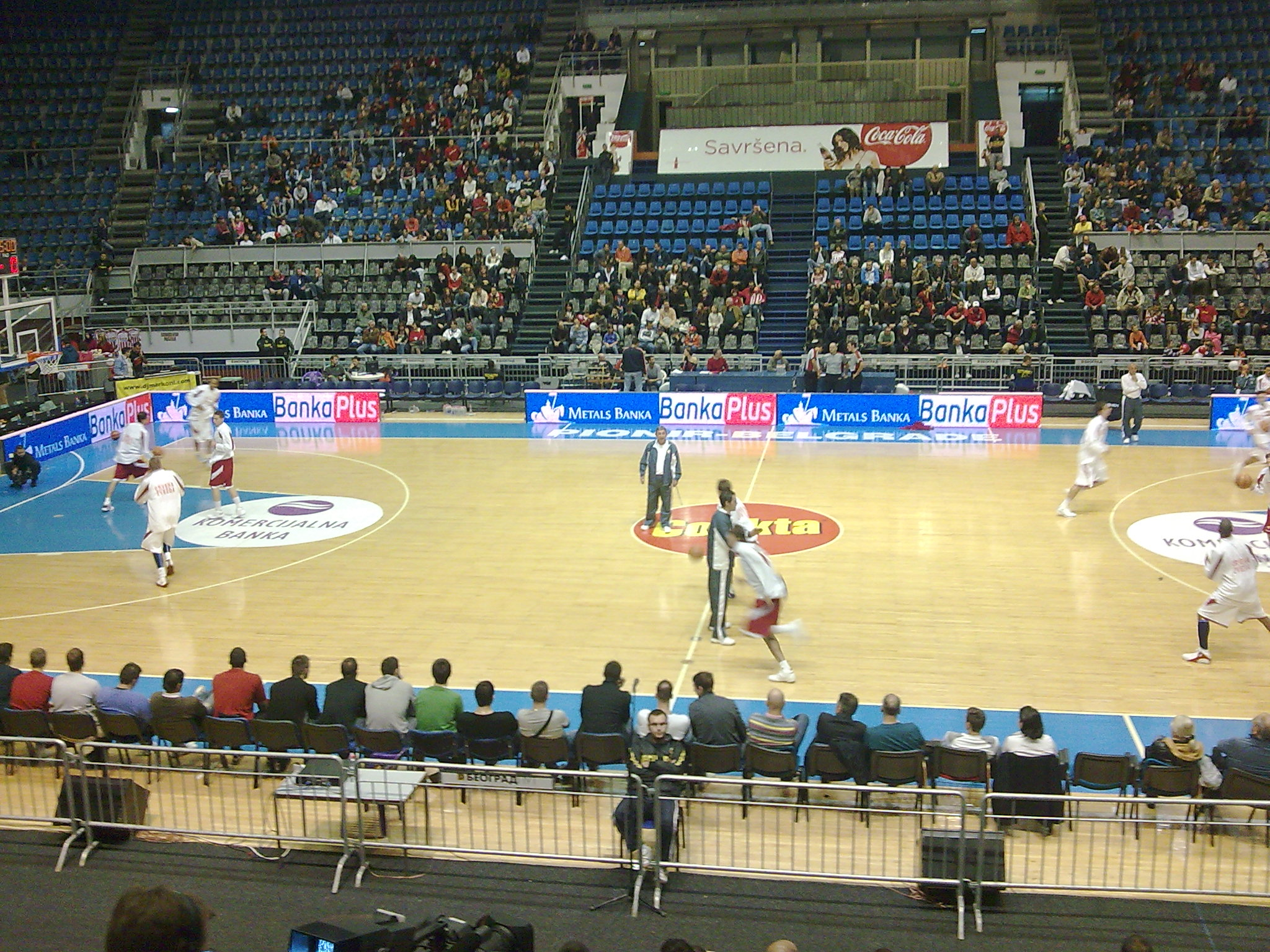
Crvena zvezda players practicing in Aleksandar Nikolić Hall under the command of head coach Svetislav Pešić in September 2008.

Crvena zvezda played their home games at the Aleksandar Nikolić Hall, located in the Belgrade municipality of Palilula. The arena, then named Pionir Hall, was built in 1973 in eleven months, by Energoprojekt. Basketball was popular in Yugoslavia at the time, and although the Aleksandar Nikolić Hall hosted many different sports events (volleyball, handball) it became known as a basketball arena. It has a seating capacity of 8,000.

Crvena zvezda plays their home matches at the Belgrade Arena, which has a seating capacity of 18,386 for basketball games. Club holds the highest attendance records for three EuroLeague seasons: 2014–15, 2015–16, and 2016–17. The Belgrade Arena is also the home of Zvezda's main rival Partizan.

== Supporters ==
Delije is an umbrella name referring to the supporters of various sports clubs that compete under the Red Star Belgrade Sports Society banner. The name is derived from the Serbian word delija, meaning "brave, hero". The name Delije first began to be used by hardcore Red Star supporters during the late 1980s, with the official inauguration taking place on 7 January 1989.

== Players ==
=== Current roster ===
Note: Flags indicate national team eligibility at FIBA-sanctioned events. Players may hold other non-FIBA nationalities not displayed.

Crvena zvezda Meridianbet roster
Players
Coaches

Pos.	No.	Nat.	Name	Ht.	Wt.	Age
C	0	(United States)	Motley, Johnathan	2.06 m (6 ft 9 in)	104 kg (229 lb)	31 – 4 May 1995
PG	1	(Armenia)	Jones, Chris	1.88 m (6 ft 2 in)	91 kg (201 lb)	33 – 10 April 1993
G	2	(Serbia)	Miljenović, Stefan (injured)	1.93 m (6 ft 4 in)	88 kg (194 lb)	25 – 21 August 2001
G	3	(Germany)	Weiler-Babb, Nick	1.96 m (6 ft 5 in)	93 kg (205 lb)	30 – 12 December 1995
G	6	(United States)	Butler, Jared	1.91 m (6 ft 3 in)	88 kg (194 lb)	26 – 25 August 2000
F	7	(Serbia)	Davidovac, Dejan	2.03 m (6 ft 8 in)	95 kg (209 lb)	31 – 17 January 1995
G	11	(United States)	Carter, Tyson	1.93 m (6 ft 4 in)	79 kg (174 lb)	28 – 14 January 1998
G/F	13	(Serbia)	Dobrić, Ognjen (C)	2.00 m (6 ft 7 in)	93 kg (205 lb)	32 – 27 October 1994
C	15	(Nigeria)	Izundu, Ebuka	2.08 m (6 ft 10 in)	105 kg (231 lb)	30 – 28 June 1996
G/F	23	(Serbia)	Đurišić, Nikola	2.03 m (6 ft 8 in)	97 kg (214 lb)	22 – 23 February 2004
F/C	24	(United States)	Baldwin Jr., Patrick	2.08 m (6 ft 10 in)	104 kg (229 lb)	24 – 18 November 2002
F/C	25	(Serbia)	Medarević, Vojin	2.06 m (6 ft 9 in)		24 – 7 June 2002
SG	30	(Serbia)	Bjelić, Andrej	1.94 m (6 ft 4 in)		18 – 17 March 2008
SF	33	(Nigeria)	Nwora, Jordan	2.03 m (6 ft 8 in)	102 kg (225 lb)	28 – 9 September 1998
C	35	(Cameroon)	Koloko, Christian	2.14 m (7 ft 0 in)	102 kg (225 lb)	26 – 20 June 2000
F	37	(Nigeria)	Ojeleye, Semi	1.98 m (6 ft 6 in)	109 kg (240 lb)	31 – 5 December 1994
SG	44	(Germany)	Krämer, David	1.96 m (6 ft 5 in)	92 kg (203 lb)	29 – 14 January 1997
PF	95	(Nigeria)	Moneke, Chima	1.99 m (6 ft 6 in)	101 kg (223 lb)	30 – 24 December 1995

Head coach

- (Spain) Ibon Navarro

Assistant coach(es)

- (Spain) Alberto Miranda
- (Serbia) Đorđe Lazarević
- (Serbia) Mladen Manojlović
- (Serbia) Nikola Kalinić
- (Serbia) Miodrag Dinić
- (Serbia) Marko Boltić

Strength & conditioning coach(es)

- (Serbia) Vladan Radonjić
- (Serbia) Igor Tomašević

Team manager

- (Serbia) Nebojša Ilić

Legend

- (C) Team captain
- Injured

- Roster
Updated: October 18, 2026

=== Depth chart ===
Pos.	Starting 5	Bench 1	Bench 2	Reserves	Inactive
C	Christian Koloko	Ebuka Izundu	Johnathan Motley	Vojin Medarević
PF	Chima Moneke	Semi Ojeleye	Patrick Baldwin Jr.
SF	Jordan Nwora	David Krämer	Dejan Davidovac
SG	Tyson Carter	Jared Butler	Ognjen Dobrić
PG	Chris Jones	Nick Weiler-Babb	Nikola Đurišić		Stefan Miljenović

=== Retired numbers ===
Crvena zvezda retired numbers
No	Nat.	Player	Position	Tenure	Ref.
8	(Serbia)	Igor Rakočević	SG	1994–2000, 2003–2004, 2012–2013	

=== The Stars of Red Star ===
The following players were selected as the Zvezdine zvezde (lit. transl. The Star's Stars, meaning The Stars of Red Star).

The Stars of Red Star
Nat.	Player	Pos.	Tenure
(Socialist Federal Republic of Yugoslavia)	Aleksandar Gec	G	1945–1953
(Socialist Federal Republic of Yugoslavia)	Nebojša Popović	G	1945–1951
(Socialist Federal Republic of Yugoslavia)	Aleksandar Nikolić	SF	1947–1949
(Socialist Federal Republic of Yugoslavia)	Borislav Stanković	C	1946–1948
(Socialist Federal Republic of Yugoslavia)	Vladimir Cvetković	F/C	1959–1972
(Socialist Federal Republic of Yugoslavia)	Zoran Slavnić	PG	1967–1977
(Socialist Federal Republic of Yugoslavia)	Zoran Radović	PG	1981–1990
(Serbia and Montenegro)	Saša Obradović	G	1987–1993, 1994, 1999–2000

=== Players on the NBA draft ===
^{#}	Denotes player who has never appeared in an NBA regular-season or playoff game

Year	Rnd.	Pick	Player	Pos.	Drafted by
2000	2	51	(Serbia and Montenegro) Igor Rakočević	SG	Minnesota Timberwolves
2008	2	53	(Serbia) Tadija Dragićević^{#}	PF	Utah Jazz, traded to Houston Rockets
2010	2	35	(Serbia) Nemanja Bjelica	PF/SF	Washington Wizards, traded to Minnesota Timberwolves
2015	2	60	(Serbia) Luka Mitrović^{#}	PF	Philadelphia 76ers, traded to Sacramento Kings
2017	2	36	(Australia) Jonah Bolden	PF	Philadelphia 76ers
2024	1	12	(Serbia) Nikola Topić	PG	Oklahoma City Thunder

=== Team captains ===
- (Socialist Federal Republic of Yugoslavia) Milivoje Matić (1960s)
- (Socialist Federal Republic of Yugoslavia) Vladimir Cvetković (–1972)
- (Socialist Federal Republic of Yugoslavia) Dragan Kapičić (1972–1975)
- (Serbia and Montenegro) Nebojša Ilić (1992–1993)
- (Serbia and Montenegro) Aleksandar Trifunović (1993–1996)
- (Serbia and Montenegro) Mirko Pavlović (1996–1997)
- (Serbia and Montenegro) Milenko Topić (1998–1999)
- (Serbia and Montenegro) Saša Obradović (1999–2000)
- (Serbia and Montenegro) Miloš Vujanić (2000–2001)
- (Serbia and Montenegro) Srđan Jovanović (2001–2002)
- (Serbia and Montenegro) Zlatko Bolić (2002–2003)
- (Serbia and Montenegro) Igor Rakočević (2003–2004)
- (Serbia and Montenegro) Goran Jeretin (2004–2006)
- (Serbia) Milan Gurović (2006–2007)
- (Serbia) Tadija Dragićević (2007–2010)
- (Serbia) Vuk Radivojević (2010)
- (Montenegro) Boris Bakić (2010–2011)
- (Serbia) Vuk Radivojević (2011–2012)
- (Serbia) Igor Rakočević (2012–2013)
- (Serbia) Marko Simonović (2013–2014)
- (Serbia) Luka Mitrović (2014–2017)
- (Serbia) Branko Lazić (2017–2025)
- (Serbia) Ognjen Dobrić (2025–present)

=== Second-generation players ===
The following is a list of father-and-son combinations who have played for Crvena zvezda.

Father	Son(s)	Ref.
Miroslav Prelević	Branislav Prelević	
Vladimir Cvetković	Rastko Cvetković	
Tihomir Pavlović	Mirko Pavlović	
Goran Rakočević	Igor Rakočević	
Žarko Koprivica	Jovan Koprivica	
Slobodan Tomović	Tomislav Tomović	
Milenko Topić	Nikola Topić	

== Head coaches ==
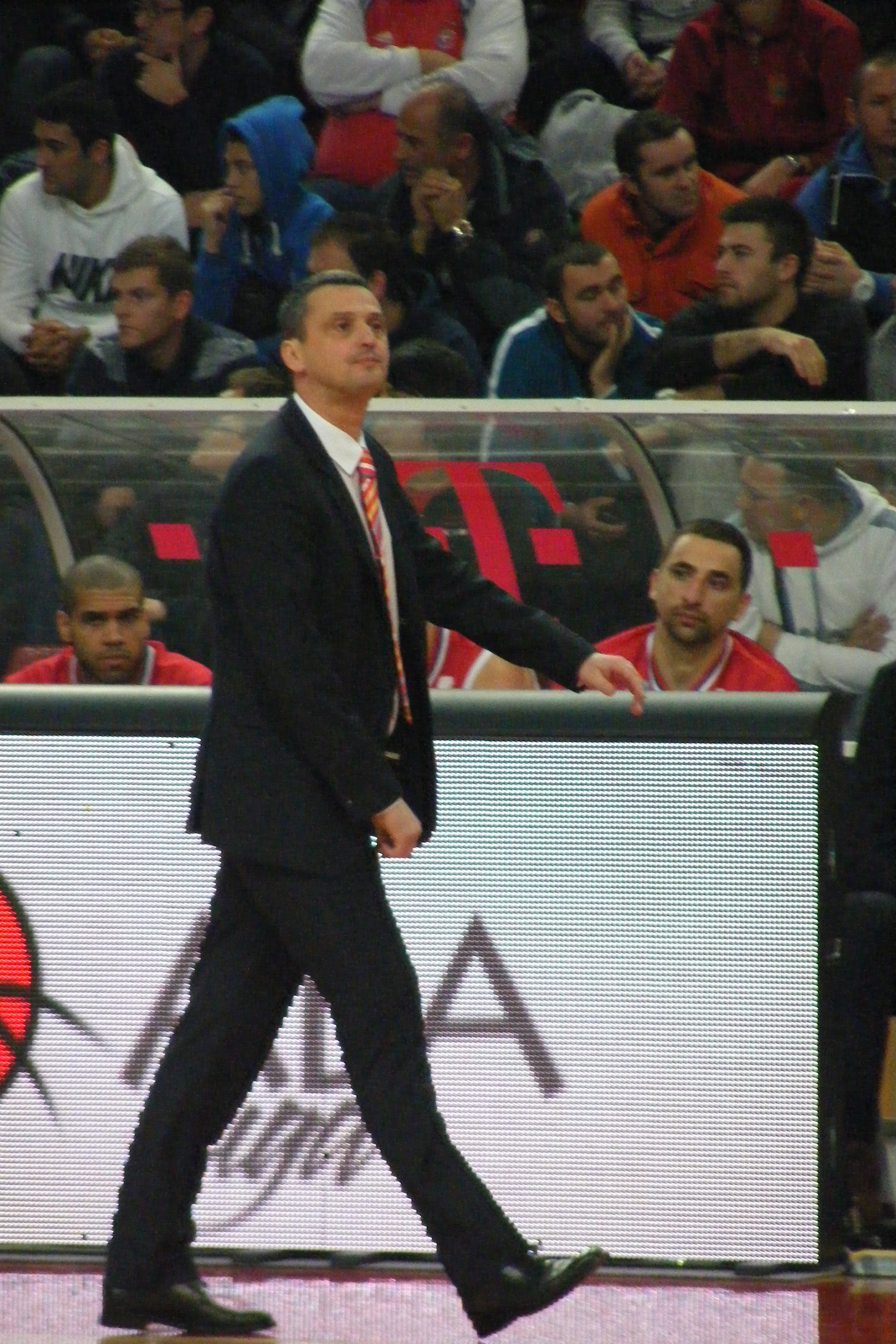
Dejan Radonjić who coached Crvena zvezda in two stints totaling five and a half seasons, leads the club's all-time list for most games coached (453) and most games won as a coach (322).

=== History ===
There have been 45 head coaches in the club's history. Montenegrin coach Dejan Radonjić is the all-time leader in both official games coached and wins. Nebojša Popović won 10 National Championships, while Radonjić won five National Cups. Dejan Radonjić, Bratislav Đorđević, Duško Ivanović and Ioannis Sfairopoulos won both a National Championship and a National Cup. Also, Crvena zvezda won 5 Adriatic Championships under Radonjić and an ABA Supercup under Milan Tomić. Coaches Radonjić, Tomić and Sfairopoulos won the Adriatic Championship and the National Championship in the same season. In the 2014–15, 2016–17, 2020–21 and 2021–22 seasons, coach Radonjić recorded three titles (Serbian League, Adriatic League, and Serbian Cup), while Sfairopoulos did the same in the 2023–24 season. Coach Aleksandar Nikolić won the only European-wide competition in the club's history, the FIBA European Cup Winners' Cup in 1974.

Aleksandar Nikolić, Ranko Žeravica and Svetislav Pešić are members of FIBA Hall of Fame as coaches, while Nikolić is a member of Naismith Memorial Basketball Hall of Fame. American coach Tom Ludwig, hired in 1997, was the first foreign head coach, and the only non-European. Montenegrins Radonjić and Ivanović, Slovenian Zmago Sagadin, Greek Sfairopoulos and Spaniard Ibon Navarro were the other foreign head coaches. Head coaches Vladislav Lučić and Aleksandar Trifunović were hired three times.

Head coaches Nebojša Popović, Aleksandar Gec, Milan Bjegojević, Đorđe Andrijašević, Aleksandar Nikolić, Nemanja Đurić, Strahinja Alagić, Dragiša Vučinić, Zoran Slavnić, Vladislav Lučić, Stevan Karadžić, Aleksandar Trifunović, Milenko Topić and Saša Obradović were also Crvena zvezda's players. Popović and Vučinić were player-coaches, while Popović, Bjegojević and Topić won the National Championships both as the players and head coaches.

The four-time EuroLeague-winning head coach, Božidar Maljković was an assistant coach for Crvena zvezda in the 1980s. Further notable assistant coaches include Marin Sedlaček, Velibor Radović, Andrija Gavrilović, Saša Kosović, Carles Marco, Nenad Jakovljević and Tomislav Tomović.

=== Notable head coaches ===
- (Socialist Federal Republic of Yugoslavia) Nebojša Popović (1946–1957)
- (Socialist Federal Republic of Yugoslavia) Milan Bjegojević (1960–1970)
- (Socialist Federal Republic of Yugoslavia) Bratislav Đorđević (1971–1973, 1976–1979)
- (Socialist Federal Republic of Yugoslavia) Aleksandar Nikolić (1973–1974)
- (Socialist Federal Republic of Yugoslavia) Ranko Žeravica (1979–1986, 1997)
- (Socialist Federal Republic of Yugoslavia) Vlade Đurović (1986–1988)
- (Socialist Federal Republic of Yugoslavia) Zoran Slavnić (1988–1991, 1994–1995)
- (Socialist Federal Republic of Yugoslavia) Duško Vujošević (1991–1992)
- (Serbia and Montenegro) Vladislav Lučić (1992–1994, 1997–1998, 1999–2000)
- (Serbia) Aleksandar Trifunović (2002–2003, 2004–2005, 2009–2010)
- (Slovenia) Zmago Sagadin (2003–2004)
- (Serbia) Dragan Šakota (2005–2007, 2019–2020)
- (Serbia) Svetislav Pešić (2008–2009, 2011–2012)
- (Montenegro) Dejan Radonjić (2013–2017, 2020–2022)
- (Serbia) Milan Tomić (2018–2019, 2026)
- (Montenegro) Duško Ivanović (2022–2023)
- (Greece) Ioannis Sfairopoulos (2023–2025)
- (Serbia) Saša Obradović (2020, 2025–2026)

== Hall of Famers, greatest players and contributors ==
=== Naismith Memorial Basketball Hall of Fame ===
Crvena zvezda Hall of Famers
Players
No.	Name	Position	Tenure	Inducted
12	Vlade Divac	C	1999	2019
15	Dražen Dalipagić	SF	1990–1991	2004
Coaches
Name		Position	Tenure	Inducted
Aleksandar Nikolić		Head coach	1973–1974	1998
Contributors
Name		Position	Tenure	Inducted
Borislav Stanković		Player	1946–1948	1991

=== FIBA Hall of Fame ===
Crvena zvezda Hall of Famers
Players
No.	Name	Position	Tenure	Inducted
8	Peja Stojaković	SF	1992–1993	2024
12	Vlade Divac	C	1999	2010
15	Dražen Dalipagić	SF	1990–1991	2007
15	Zoran Slavnić	PG	1967–1977	2013
Coaches
Name		Position	Tenure	Inducted
Aleksandar Nikolić		Head coach	1973–1974	2007
Svetislav Pešić		Head coach	2008–2009, 2011–2012	2020
Ranko Žeravica		Head coach	1979–1986	2007
Contributors
Name		Position	Tenure	Inducted
Nebojša Popović		Player, Coach	1945–1955	2007
Borislav Stanković		Player	1946–1948	2007
Radomir Šaper		Player	1945	2007

=== FIBA Order of Merit recipients ===
FIBA Order of Merit recipients
Order	Name	Tenure	Inducted
19	Aleksandar Nikolić	1945, 1947–1949 as player 1973–1974 as coach	1995
27	Nebojša Popović	1945–1951 as player 1945–1955 as coach	1997
39	Radomir Šaper	1945 as player	1999
65	Borislav Stanković	1946–1948 as player	2015

=== FIBA's 50 Greatest Players ===
Crvena zvezda Players
No.	Name	Position	Tenure	Inducted
12	Vlade Divac	C	1999	1991
15	Dražen Dalipagić	SF	1990–1991	1991
15	Zoran Slavnić	PG	1967–1977	1991

=== 50 Greatest EuroLeague Contributors ===
Crvena zvezda EuroLeague Contributors
Players
No.	Name	Position	Tenure	Inducted
12	Vlade Divac	C	1999	2008
15	Dražen Dalipagić	SF	1990–1991	2008
Coaches
Name		Position	Tenure	Inducted
Aleksandar Nikolić		Head coach	1973–1974	2008
Božidar Maljković		Assistant coach	1983–1986	2008

- Other player nominees: Zoran Slavnić
- Other coaching nominees: Ranko Žeravica, Svetislav Pešić

=== EuroLeague 25th Anniversary Team ===
Crvena zvezda Players
No.	Name	Position	Tenure	Inducted
13	Vasilije Micić	PG	2015–2016	2025
4	Miloš Teodosić	PG	2023–2025	2025

== Trophies ==
Total titles: 49

Honours		No.	Years
National league – 24 (Record)
Yugoslav League (1946–1992)	Winners	12	1946, 1947, 1948, 1949, 1950, 1951, 1952, 1953, 1954, 1955, 1968–69, 1971–72
Serbia and Montenegro League (1992–2006)	Winners	3	1992–93, 1993–94, 1997–98
Serbian League (2006–present)	Winners	9	2014–15, 2015–16, 2016–17, 2017–18, 2018–19, 2020–21, 2021–22, 2022–23, 2023–24
National cup – 15
Yugoslav Cup (1959–2002)	Winners	3	1970–71, 1972–73, 1974–75
Serbian Cup (2002–present)	Winners	12	2003–04, 2005–06, 2012–13, 2013–14, 2014–15, 2016–17, 2020–21, 2021–22, 2022–23, 2023–24, 2024–25, 2025–26
National supercup – 1
Yugoslav Super Cup (1993)	Winners	1	1993
Regional competitions – 8
Adriatic League (2001–present)	Winners	7	2014–15, 2015–16, 2016–17, 2018–19, 2020–21, 2021–22, 2023–24
Adriatic Super Cup (2017–present)	Winners	1	2018
European competitions – 1
FIBA Saporta Cup (1966–2002)	Winners	1	1973–74

Source: Crvena zvezda

== Youth system ==
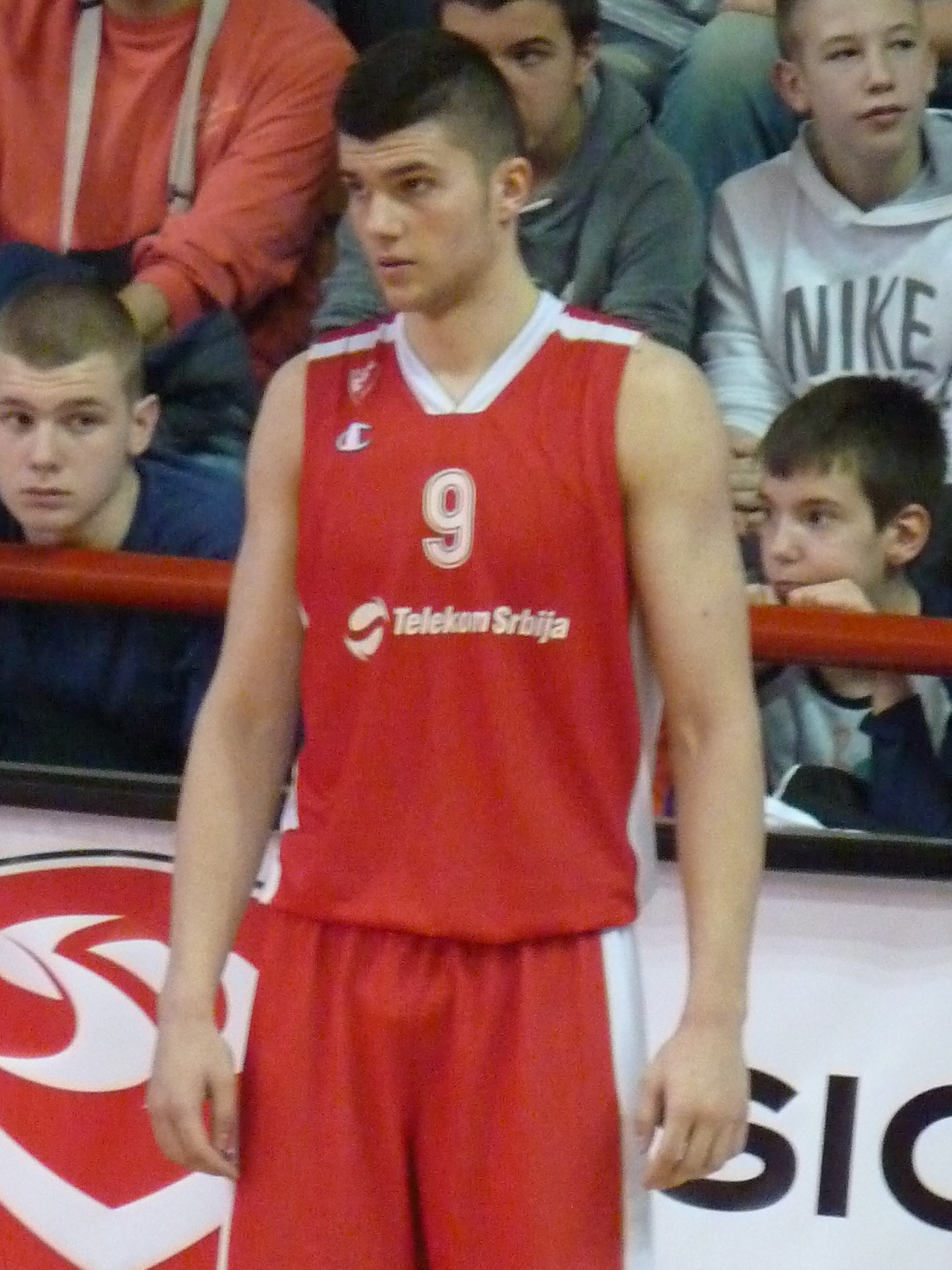
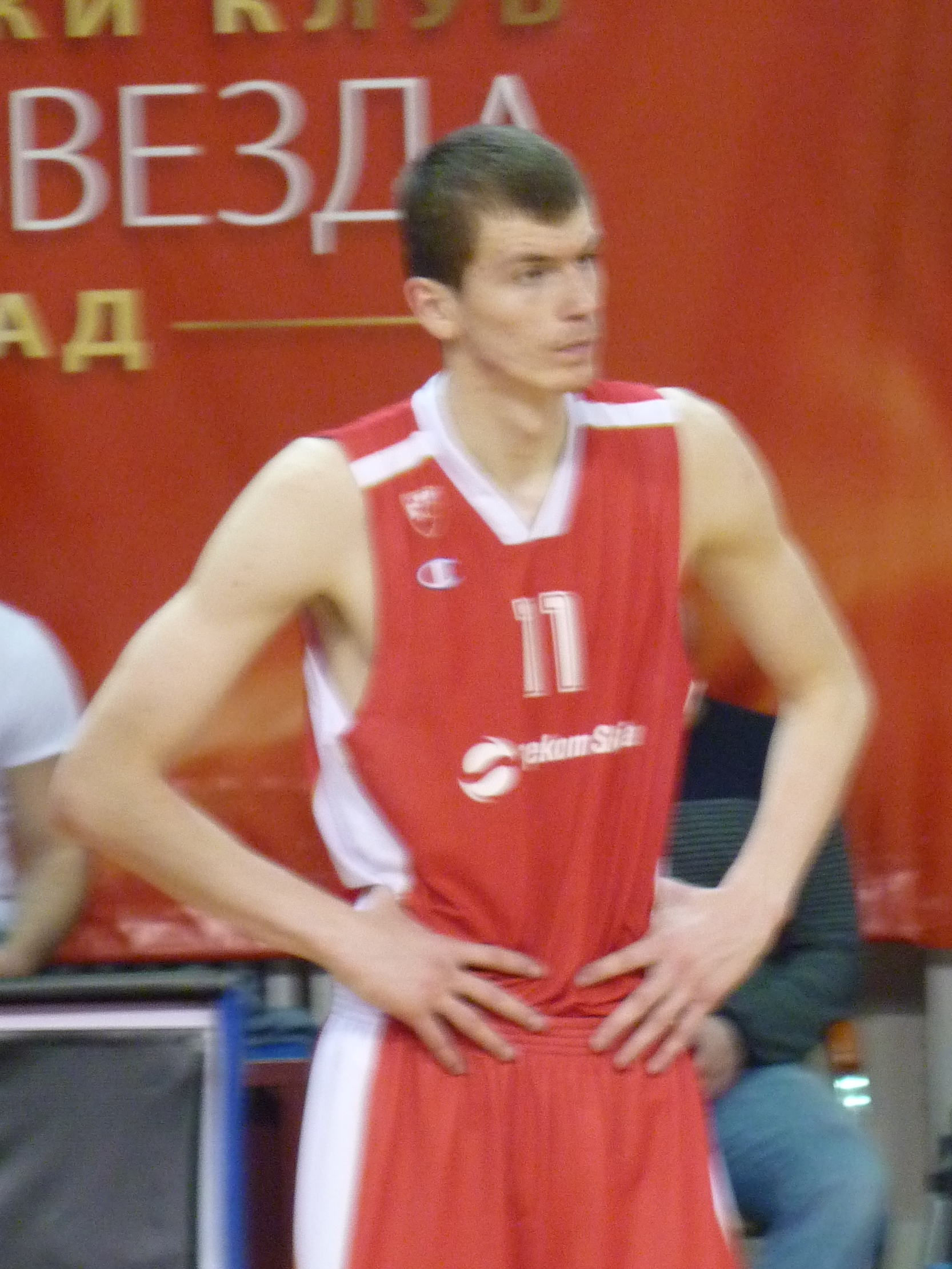
Vojislav Stojanović (left) and Boriša Simanić (right) are the only Crvena zvezda U-18 players who won Euroleague NGT Finals MVP award.

=== History ===
The biggest achievement of the Crvena zvezda youth team is winning the Euroleague NGT in 2014, as well as reaching the finals in 2015 and 2016.

Some of the most notable home-grown players are Zoran Slavnić, a member of the 50 greatest players in the history of FIBA international basketball, as selected in 1991, then Igor Rakočević – the three-time EuroLeague Top Scorer, Peja Stojaković – the NBA All-Star player and FIBA EuroBasket MVP, as well as Vladimir Cvetković and Dragan Kapičić.

Further notable home-grown players include Goran Rakočević, Ivan Sarjanović, Žarko Koprivica, Slobodan Nikolić, Predrag Bogosavljev, Boban Janković, Mirko Milićević, Branislav Prelević, Aleksandar Trifunović, Nebojša Ilić, Saša Obradović, Rastko Cvetković, Nikola Jestratijević, Miloš Vujanić, Vladimir Radmanović, Milko Bjelica, Luka Bogdanović, Tadija Dragićević, Nemanja Nedović, Ognjen Dobrić, Marko Gudurić and Nikola Topić.

Aleksandar Đorđević (one of 50 Greatest EuroLeague Contributors), Dejan Koturović, Marko Jarić, and Vladimir Micov were members of the club's youth system who have never appeared in a regular-season or playoff game for the first team.

=== Current staff ===
For the 2026–27 season.

- Youth system coordinator: Dragoljub Avramović
- U19 head coach: Dragoljub Avramović

== Management ==
=== Current officeholders ===
The following people are the current officeholders of Crvena zvezda (elections held on 23 October 2026):

- President: Željko Drčelić
- Board President: Živorad Vasić
- Chairperson of the Assembly: Dragan Lončar
- General manager: Milan Tomić
- Sporting director: Miloš Teodosić
- Finance director: Alek Kulundžić
- Marketing director: Janko Stanković

=== Presidents ===
- (Socialist Federal Republic of Yugoslavia) Mira Petrović (1945)
- (Socialist Federal Republic of Yugoslavia) Mirko Aksentijević (1945–1950)
- (Socialist Federal Republic of Yugoslavia) Milorad Sokolović
- (Socialist Federal Republic of Yugoslavia) Aleksandar Gec (1968–1975)
- (Serbia and Montenegro) Dragiša Vučinić (1991–1994)
- (Serbia and Montenegro) Vojislav Stojaković (1996–2000)
- (Serbia and Montenegro) Nebojša Popović (2000–2001)
- (Serbia and Montenegro) Živorad Anđelković (2001–2005)
- (Serbia) Mirko Petrović (2005–2008)
- (Serbia) Slobodan Vučićević (2008–2010)
- (Serbia) Vladislav Lučić (2010)
- (Serbia) Nebojša Čović (2011–2024)
- (Serbia) Željko Drčelić (2024–present)

=== Chairperson of the Assembly ===
- (Serbia and Montenegro) Rajko Žižić (2001–2003)
- (Serbia) Živorad Anđelković (2006–2008)
- (Serbia) Zoran Drakulić (2008–2010)
- (Serbia) Živorad Anđelković (2011–2013)
- (Serbia) Branislav Đurđević (2013–2014)
- (Serbia) Branislav Baćović (2016–2020)
- (Serbia) Ljubomir Milić (2020–2026)
- (Serbia) Dragan Lončar (2026–present)

=== Honorary President ===
- (Socialist Federal Republic of Yugoslavia) Ivo Andrić (1963–1975)
- (Serbia) Vladimir Cvetković (2021–2026)

=== General managers, directors, and secretaries general ===
- (Socialist Federal Republic of Yugoslavia) Ratomir Vićentić (1965–1972)
- (Serbia and Montenegro) Dragan Kapičić (1991–1994)
- (Serbia and Montenegro) Slobodan Mladenović (1990s)
- (Serbia and Montenegro) Igor Žeželj (2001–2005)
- (Serbia) Andrija Kleut (2007–2008)
- (Serbia) Milan Opačić (2008–2010)
- (Serbia) Mirko Pavlović (2010–2015)
- (Serbia) Davor Ristović (2015–2018)
- (Serbia) Filip Sunturlić (2018–2021)
- (Serbia) Nemanja Vasiljević (2022–2025)
- (Serbia) Milan Tomić (2025–present)

=== Sporting directors ===
- (Serbia and Montenegro) Miroslav Prelević (late 1990s)
- (Serbia and Montenegro) Ranko Žeravica
- (Serbia and Montenegro) Branko Kovačević (unknown–2000)
- (Serbia and Montenegro) Borislav Džaković (1999, interim)
- (Serbia and Montenegro) Zoran Jovanović (2000–2001)
- (Slovenia) Zmago Sagadin (2002–2004)
- (Serbia) Branko Kovačević (mid-2000s)
- (Serbia) Mirko Pavlović (2015–2017)
- (Serbia) Nebojša Ilić (2017–2019)
- (Montenegro) Žarko Čabarkapa (2019–2020)
- (Serbia) Nemanja Vasiljević (2020–2022)
- (Serbia) Milan Dozet (2022–2026)
- (Serbia) Miloš Teodosić (2026–present)

=== Team managers ===
- (Serbia) Nebojša Ilić (2001–present)

== Notable players ==
Note: Flags indicate national team eligibility at FIBA-sanctioned events. Players may hold other non-FIBA nationalities not displayed.

Criteria

To appear in this section a player must have either:

- Set a club record or won an individual award while at the club
- Played at least one official international match for their national team at any time
- Played at least one official NBA match at any time.

1940s

- (Socialist Federal Republic of Yugoslavia) Strahinja Alagić
- (Socialist Federal Republic of Yugoslavia) Milan Bjegojević
- (Socialist Federal Republic of Yugoslavia) Aleksandar Gec
- (Socialist Federal Republic of Yugoslavia) Srđan Kalember
- (Socialist Federal Republic of Yugoslavia) Aleksandar Nikolić
- (Socialist Federal Republic of Yugoslavia) Nebojša Popović
- (Socialist Federal Republic of Yugoslavia) Tullio Rochlitzer
- (Socialist Federal Republic of Yugoslavia) Milorad Sokolović
- (Socialist Federal Republic of Yugoslavia) Borislav Stanković
- (Socialist Federal Republic of Yugoslavia) Vasilije Stojković

1950s

- (Socialist Federal Republic of Yugoslavia) Đorđe Andrijašević
- (Socialist Federal Republic of Yugoslavia) Borislav Ćurčić
- (Socialist Federal Republic of Yugoslavia) Ladislav Demšar
- (Socialist Federal Republic of Yugoslavia) Dragan Godžić
- (Socialist Federal Republic of Yugoslavia) Borko Jovanović
- (Socialist Federal Republic of Yugoslavia) Đorđe Konjović
- (Socialist Federal Republic of Yugoslavia) Milutin Minja
- (Socialist Federal Republic of Yugoslavia) Obren Popović
- (Socialist Federal Republic of Yugoslavia) Branko Radović

1960s

- (Socialist Federal Republic of Yugoslavia) Vladimir Cvetković
- (Socialist Federal Republic of Yugoslavia) Sreten Dragojlović
- (Socialist Federal Republic of Yugoslavia) Nemanja Đurić
- (Socialist Federal Republic of Yugoslavia) Milivoje Matić
- (Socialist Federal Republic of Yugoslavia) Tihomir Pavlović
- (Socialist Federal Republic of Yugoslavia) Ratomir Vićentić

1970s

- (Socialist Federal Republic of Yugoslavia) Dragan Kapičić
- (Socialist Federal Republic of Yugoslavia) Žarko Koprivica
- (Socialist Federal Republic of Yugoslavia) Zoran Lazarević
- (Socialist Federal Republic of Yugoslavia) Goran Rakočević
- (Socialist Federal Republic of Yugoslavia) Ivan Sarjanović
- (Socialist Federal Republic of Yugoslavia) Ljubodrag Simonović
- (Socialist Federal Republic of Yugoslavia) Zoran Slavnić
- (Socialist Federal Republic of Yugoslavia) Dragiša Vučinić
- (Socialist Federal Republic of Yugoslavia) Radivoje Živković

1980s

- (Socialist Federal Republic of Yugoslavia) Zufer Avdija
- (Socialist Federal Republic of Yugoslavia) Predrag Bogosavljev
- (Socialist Federal Republic of Yugoslavia) Boban Janković
- (Socialist Federal Republic of Yugoslavia) Stevan Karadžić
- (Socialist Federal Republic of Yugoslavia) Branko Kovačević
- (Socialist Federal Republic of Yugoslavia) Mirko Milićević
- (Socialist Federal Republic of Yugoslavia) Slobodan Nikolić
- (Socialist Federal Republic of Yugoslavia) Ivo Petović
- (Socialist Federal Republic of Yugoslavia) Branislav Prelević
- (Socialist Federal Republic of Yugoslavia) Zoran Radović
- (Socialist Federal Republic of Yugoslavia) Rajko Žižić

1990s

- (Serbia and Montenegro) Zlatko Bolić
- (Serbia and Montenegro) Rastko Cvetković
- (Socialist Federal Republic of Yugoslavia) Dražen Dalipagić
- (Serbia and Montenegro) Vlade Divac
- (Serbia and Montenegro) Nebojša Ilić
- (Serbia and Montenegro) Nikola Jestratijević
- (Serbia and Montenegro) Zoran Jovanović
- (Serbia and Montenegro) Mileta Lisica
- (Serbia and Montenegro) Dragan Lukovski
- (Serbia and Montenegro) Saša Obradović
- (Serbia and Montenegro) Luka Pavićević
- (Serbia and Montenegro) Vladimir Radmanović
- (Serbia and Montenegro) Igor Rakočević
- (Serbia and Montenegro) Zoran Sretenović
- (Serbia and Montenegro) Jovo Stanojević
- (Serbia and Montenegro) Predrag Stojaković
- (Serbia and Montenegro) Dragan Tarlać
- (Serbia and Montenegro) Dejan Tomašević
- (Serbia and Montenegro) Milenko Topić
- (Serbia and Montenegro) Aleksandar Trifunović
- (Serbia and Montenegro) Dušan Vukčević
- (United States) Charles Smith

2000s

- (Bosnia and Herzegovina) Elmedin Kikanović
- (Bulgaria) Filip Videnov
- (Montenegro) Milko Bjelica
- (Montenegro) Omar Cook
- (Montenegro) Goran Jeretin
- (Nigeria) Tunji Awojobi
- (Nigeria) Obinna Ekezie
- (North Macedonia) Pero Antić
- (Serbia) Nemanja Bjelica
- (Serbia) Tadija Dragićević
- (Serbia) Vladislav Dragojlović
- (Serbia) Milan Gurović
- (Serbia) Marko Kešelj
- (Serbia) Marko Marinović
- (Serbia) Petar Popović
- (Serbia) Vuk Radivojević
- (Serbia) Miroslav Raičević
- (Serbia) Vladimir Štimac
- (Serbia) Miloš Vujanić
- (United States) Andre Owens
- (United States) Scoonie Penn
- (United States) Lawrence Roberts
- (United States) Mike Taylor

2010s

- (Czech Republic) Blake Schilb
- (Dominican Republic) James Feldeine
- (France) Mathias Lessort
- (Germany) Maik Zirbes
- (Greece) Stratos Perperoglou
- (Greece) Sofoklis Schortsanitis
- (Ivory Coast) Deon Thompson
- (Montenegro) Taylor Rochestie
- (Senegal) Mouhammad Faye
- (Serbia) Nemanja Dangubić
- (Serbia) Dejan Davidovac
- (Serbia) Ognjen Dobrić
- (Serbia) Marko Gudurić
- (Serbia) Stefan Jović
- (Serbia) Nikola Kalinić
- (Serbia) Raško Katić
- (Serbia) Ognjen Kuzmić
- (Serbia) Branko Lazić
- (Serbia) Boban Marjanović
- (Serbia) Vasilije Micić
- (Serbia) Luka Mitrović
- (Serbia) Nemanja Nedović
- (Serbia) Bojan Popović
- (Serbia) Marko Simonović
- (Slovenia) Jaka Blažič
- (Slovenia) Alen Omić
- (Spain) Lorenzo Brown
- (United States) Billy Baron
- (United States) Charles Jenkins
- (United States) Tarence Kinsey
- (United States) Quincy Miller
- (United States) Adam Morrison
- (United States) DeMarcus Nelson
- (United States) Joe Ragland
- (United States) Omar Thomas
- (United States) Marcus Williams
- (United States) Nate Wolters

2020s

- (Argentina) Facundo Campazzo
- (Argentina) Luca Vildoza
- (Armenia) Chris Jones
- (Australia) Duop Reath
- (Brazil) Yago dos Santos
- (Bulgaria) Codi Miller-McIntyre
- (Cameroon) Christian Koloko
- (Cameroon) Landry Nnoko
- (Cuba) Jasiel Rivero
- (Germany) David Krämer
- (Germany) Nick Weiler-Babb
- (Ghana) Ben Bentil
- (Hungary) Ádám Hanga
- (Lithuania) Rokas Giedraitis
- (Lithuania) Donatas Motiejūnas
- (Montenegro) Nikola Ivanović
- (Nigeria) Ebuka Izundu
- (Nigeria) Chima Moneke
- (Nigeria) Jordan Nwora
- (Nigeria) Semi Ojeleye
- (Poland) Jordan Loyd
- (Puerto Rico) John Holland
- (Russia) Joel Bolomboy
- (Serbia) Nikola Đurišić
- (Serbia) Marko Jagodić-Kuridža
- (Serbia) Stefan Marković
- (Serbia) Filip Petrušev
- (Serbia) Miroslav Raduljica
- (Serbia) Miloš Teodosić
- (Serbia) Nikola Topić
- (Slovenia) Mike Tobey
- (Spain) Quino Colom
- (United States) Jared Butler
- (United States) Isaiah Canaan
- (United States) Freddie Gillespie
- (United States) Devonte' Graham
- (United States) Johnathan Motley
- (United States) Shabazz Napier
- (United States) Javonte Smart
- (United States) Trey Thompkins

== See also ==
- List of basketball clubs in Serbia by major honours won
