= Božidar Pešić =

Serbian basketball player and architect

- Pešić with Crvena zvezda in 1971
- Born: 1952 (age 73–74); Belgrade, PR Serbia, Yugoslavia
- Occupations: architect; basketball player
- Basketball career

Personal information
- Listed height: 2.02 m (6 ft 8 in)
- Listed weight: 97 kg (214 lb)

Career information
- NBA draft: 1974: undrafted
- Playing career: 1970–1975
- Position: Center
- Number: 7

Career history
- 1970–1975: Crvena zvezda

Božidar Pešić (Serbian Cyrillic: Божидар Пешић; born 1952) is a Serbian architect and former basketball player.

== Playing career ==
Pešić played for a Belgrade-based team Crvena zvezda of the Yugoslav First League for five seasons, from 1970 to 1975. His teammates were Zoran Slavnić, Dragan Kapičić, Ljubodrag Simonović, Dragiša Vučinić, and Goran Rakočević among others. With them, he won a FIBA European Cup Winners' Cup in 1974, a Yugoslav Championships, and three National Cups.

== Career achievements ==
- FIBA European Cup Winners' Cup winner: 1 (with Crvena zvezda: 1973–74).
- Yugoslav League champion: 1 (with Crvena zvezda: 1971–72).
- Yugoslav Cup winner: 3 (with Crvena zvezda: 1970–71, 1972–73, 1974–75).

== Personal life ==
Pešić and his wife Ann has three sons; Ljubiša, Mihajlo, and Aleksandar. His wife Ann was born in Dublin, Ireland. His son Mihajlo (born 1981) is a professional basketball player.

== See also ==
- List of KK Crvena zvezda players with 100 games played
