= Ivan Sarjanović =

Serbian physician and basketball player

Ivan Sarjanović M.D.
- Sarjanović with Crvena zvezda in 1971
- Born: 30 April 1949 (age 77); Belgrade, Yugoslavia
- Education: University of Belgrade (MD); Marche Polytechnic University; University of Ljubljana
- Occupations: physician; basketball player
- Years active: 1981–2015
- Medical career
- Institutions: St. Luke's Hospital, Malta
- Basketball career

Personal information
- Listed height: 1.95 m (6 ft 5 in)
- Listed weight: 90 kg (198 lb)

Career information
- NBA draft: 1971: undrafted
- Playing career: 1967–1995
- Position: Small forward
- Number: 6
- Coaching career: 1993–1995

Career history
- 1967–1976: Crvena zvezda
- 1977–1981: Jagodina
- 1984–1985: Bank of Valletta
- 1993–1995: Basket Montefeltro
Medals
Men's basketball
Representing Yugoslavia
European Championship for Juniors
Silver medal – second place	1968 Spain	Junior Team

Ivan Sarjanović (Serbian Cyrillic: Иван Сарјановић; born 30 April 1949), is a Serbian physician and former professional basketball player.

== Medical career ==
Sarjanović earned his master's degree in medicine from the University of Belgrade in 1981. Also, he received degrees in medicine from the Marche Polytechnic University in Ancona, Italy and the University of Ljubljana, Slovenia. As a physician, Sarjanović worked in Malta, Slovenia, Italy and the United States (Houston, TX).

Also, Sarjanović was a sports physician for the Crvena zvezda basketball team and the Yugoslavia national basketball team.

== Playing career ==
Sarjanović spent most of his playing career with Crvena zvezda of the Yugoslav Basketball League, where he played from 1967 to 1976. At that time, his teammates were Zoran Slavnić, Dragan Kapičić, Ljubodrag Simonović, Dragiša Vučinić, Vladimir Cvetković and Goran Rakočević among others. With them he won two National Championships, three National Cups and the 1974 FIBA European Cup Winners' Cup.

After his compulsory military service in 1977, he signed for Jagodina and played four seasons there. His last game for Jagodina was against his former team Crvena zvezda at the 1981 Yugoslav Cup. Later, Sarjanović had a few stints with basketball teams located in cities where he worked as the physician.

== National team career ==
Sarjanović was a member of the Yugoslavia national junior team that won silver medal at the 1968 European Championship for Junior Men in Vigo, Spain. Over five tournament games, he averaged 4.8 points per game.

== Career achievements ==
- FIBA European Cup Winners' Cup winner: 1 (with Crvena zvezda: 1973–74).
- Yugoslav League champion: 2 (with Crvena zvezda: 1968–69, 1971–72).
- Yugoslav Cup winner: 3 (with Crvena zvezda: 1970–71, 1972–73, 1974–75).

== Personal life ==
Sarjanović married Ljudmila and they have two kids.

== See also ==
- List of KK Crvena zvezda players with 100 games played
