= Zoran Latifić =

Serbian basketball player

- Position: Power forward
- Number: 9, 10, 13

Career history
- 1971–1974: Crvena zvezda
- 1974–1975: Mladost Zemun

Zoran Latifić (Serbian Cyrillic: Зоран Латифић) is a Serbian former professional basketball player.

== Playing career ==
Latifić played for a Belgrade-based team Crvena zvezda of the Yugoslav First League from 1971 to 1974. His teammates were Zoran Slavnić, Dragan Kapičić, Ljubodrag Simonović, Dragiša Vučinić, and Goran Rakočević among others. With them, he won a FIBA European Cup Winners' Cup in 1974, a National Championship in 1972, and a National Cup in 1975.

During the 1974–75 season, Latifić played for Mladost Zemun.

== Career achievements ==
- FIBA European Cup Winners' Cup winner: 1 (with Crvena zvezda: 1973–74)
- Yugoslav League champion: 1 (with Crvena zvezda: 1971–72).
- Yugoslav Cup winner: 1 (with Crvena zvezda: 1974–75)

== Personal life ==
His brother Goran is a former basketball player for Partizan (1968–1977).

Latifić is a great-nephew of Gavrilo Princip, a member of Young Bosnia who assassinated Archduke Franz Ferdinand of Austria and the Archduke's wife in 1914.
