= Tihomir Pavlović =

Serbian basketball player

- Pavlović with Crvena zvezda in 1971

Personal information
- Born: 1946 Belgrade, PR Serbia, FPR Yugoslavia
- Died: 19 June 2010 (aged 63–64) Belgrade, Serbia
- Listed height: 1.95 m (6 ft 5 in)
- Listed weight: 87 kg (192 lb)

Career information
- NBA draft: 1968: undrafted
- Playing career: 1963–1972
- Position: Center / power forward
- Number: 14

Career history
- 1963–1972: Crvena zvezda

Career highlights
- 2× Yugoslav League champion (1969, 1972)

Tihomir Pavlović (Serbian Cyrillic: Тихомир Павловић; 1946 – 19 June 2010), was a Serbian professional basketball player. He is a father of Mirko Pavlović, a Serbian professional basketball executive and former player.

== Playing career ==
Pavlović spent entire playing career in Crvena zvezda of the Yugoslav Basketball League. His teammates were Zoran Slavnić, Dragan Kapičić, Ljubodrag Simonović, Dragiša Vučinić, Sreten Dragojlović, Ratomir Vićentić and Vladimir Cvetković among others. With the Zvezda he won two National Championships, in the 1968–69 and the 1971–72 season.

Eighteen-year-old Pavlović was a member of the Belgrade Selection that played two exhibition games against the NBA All-Stars in May 1964. The NBA All-Stars team members were Bill Russell, Bob Pettit, Oscar Robertson, Bob Cousy, Jerry Lucas, Tom Heinsohn, K.C. Jones, Tom Gola and the coach was Red Auerbach.

== National team career ==
Pavlović was a member of the Yugoslavia national junior team that finished 7th at the 1964 European Championship for Junior Men in Naples, Italy. Over five tournament games, he averaged 4.6 points per game.

== Career achievements ==
- Yugoslav League champion: 2 (with Crvena zvezda: 1968–69, 1971–72)

== Personal life ==
Pavlović married Olga and they had a son and a daughter Aleksandra. His son Mirko (born 1971) is a former professional basketball player who started his career in Crvena zvezda, also. Mirko played college basketball for the Southern Illinois Salukis and was a general manager of the Zvezda in 2010s.

Pavlović was an aircraft pilot and was the first owner of a minigolf course in Belgrade.

== See also ==
- List of father-and-son combinations who have played for Crvena zvezda
- List of KK Crvena zvezda players with 100 games played
