= Ljupče Žugić =

Serbian basketball player and executive

Personal information
- Born: 22 September 1952 (age 74) Nikšić, PR Montenegro, Yugoslavia
- Listed height: 2.02 m (6 ft 8 in)
- Listed weight: 97 kg (214 lb)

Career information
- NBA draft: 1974: undrafted
- Playing career: 1970–1985
- Position: Center / power forward
- Number: 9, 13, 14

Career history
- 1971–1979: Crvena zvezda
- 1972–1973: → Metalac
- 1980–1982: Radnički Kragujevac
- 1982–1983: Jagodina
- 1983–1985: OKK Beograd

Career highlights
- European Cup Winners' Cup champion (1974); Yugoslav League champion (1972)

Ljupče Žugić (Serbian Cyrillic: Љупче Жугић; born 22 September 1952), is a Serbian journalist, marketing specialist, basketball executive and former professional basketball player.

== Playing career ==
Žugić played for Belgrade-based Crvena zvezda of the Yugoslav Basketball League during the 1970s. At that time, his teammates were Zoran Slavnić, Dragan Kapičić, Ljubodrag Simonović, Dragiša Vučinić, and Goran Rakočević among others. With them he won the 1971–72 Yugoslav League and the 1974 FIBA European Cup Winners' Cup.

He also played for Metalac, Radnički Kragujevac, Jagodina, and OKK Beograd during his career. He retired as a player with OKK Beograd in 1985.

== Post-playing career ==
Žugić earned his bachelor's degree in journalism from the University of Belgrade. After retirement as basketball player, he led off his career in journalism. He was a journalist for Novosti 8 newspaper from 1986 to 1990. Later, he worked in JK Sport for sixteen years, as a marketing director and a Deputy CEO, subsequently.

Žugić was a general manager for Beobanka of the YUBA League from 1995 to 1998.

Žugić was an assistant director of competitions at the EuroBasket 2005 in Serbia and Montenegro. He was an executive director of the 2007 FIBA Europe Under-18 Championship for Women and the 2007 FIBA Under-19 World Championship, both held in Novi Sad, Serbia. Also, he was a sports director of basketball competition at the 2007 European Youth Summer Olympic Festival.

Most recently, Žugić was a marketing manager for the Basketball Federation of Serbia. He got retired in April 2021.

Žigić was elected on 5-year term as a member of the Assembly of the Crvena zvezda Basketball Club on 27 December 2021.

== Career achievements ==
- FIBA European Cup Winners' Cup winner: 1 (with Crvena zvezda: 1973–74).
- Yugoslav League champion: 1 (with Crvena zvezda: 1971–72).

== Personal life ==
Žugić married Snežana Krstić and they have two sons, Aleksandar Krstić (born 1982) and Vojin Žugić (born 1995).

== See also ==
- List of KK Crvena zvezda players with 100 games played
