= Zoran Lazarević (basketball player) =

Serbian basketball player (born 1947)

- Lazarević with Crvena zvezda in 1971

Personal information
- Born: 23 October 1947 (age 79) Knjaževac, Yugoslavia
- Listed height: 1.97 m (6 ft 6 in)
- Listed weight: 92 kg (203 lb)

Career information
- NBA draft: 1969: undrafted
- Playing career: 1965–1975
- Position: Power forward
- Number: 5

Career history
- 1965–1968: Pirot
- 1968–1975: Crvena zvezda

Zoran Lazarević (Serbian Cyrillic: Зоран Лазаревић; born 23 October 1947) is a Serbian former professional basketball player.

== Playing career ==
Lazarević was a member of Pirot until 1968 where he played with Svetislav Pešić.

Lazarević played for a Belgrade-based team Crvena zvezda of the Yugoslav First League from 1968 to 1975. His teammates were Zoran Slavnić, Dragan Kapičić, Ljubodrag Simonović, Dragiša Vučinić, and Goran Rakočević among others. With them, he won a FIBA European Cup Winners' Cup in 1974, two National Championships, and three National Cups.

== Career achievements ==
- FIBA European Cup Winners' Cup winner: 1 (with Crvena zvezda: 1973–74).
- Yugoslav League champion: 2 (with Crvena zvezda: 1968–69, 1971–72).
- Yugoslav Cup winner: 3 (with Crvena zvezda: 1970–71, 1972–73, 1974–75).

== See also ==
- List of KK Crvena zvezda players with 100 games played
