= Dragoje Jovašević =

Serbian basketball player

- Number: 9, 14

Career history
- 1973–1979: Crvena zvezda

Dragoje Jovašević (Serbian Cyrillic: Драгоје Јовашевић) is a Serbian former professional basketball player.

== Playing career ==
Jovašević played for a Belgrade-based team Crvena zvezda of the Yugoslav First League from 1973 to 1979. His teammates were Zoran Slavnić, Dragan Kapičić, Ljubodrag Simonović, Dragiša Vučinić, and Goran Rakočević among others. With them, he won a FIBA European Cup Winners' Cup in 1974 and a National Cup in 1975.

== Career achievements ==
- FIBA European Cup Winners' Cup winner: 1 (with Crvena zvezda: 1973–74).
- Yugoslav Cup winner: 1 (with Crvena zvezda: 1974–75).

== See also ==
- List of KK Crvena zvezda players with 100 games played
