= Slobodan Popović (basketball) =

Yugoslav basketball player

Personal information
- Born: 1944 Loznica, German-occupied Serbia
- Died: 31 December 1968 (aged 24) Belgrade, SR Serbia, Yugoslavia
- Listed height: 1.92 m (6 ft 4 in)

Career information
- Playing career: 1961–1968
- Position: Forward
- Number: 14

Career history
- 1961–1963: Bijeljina
- 1963–1968: Crvena zvezda

Slobodan "Boban" Popović (Serbian Cyrillic: Слободан "Бобан" Поповић; 1944 – 31 December 1968) was a Yugoslav professional basketball player.

== Playing career ==
Born in Loznica, Popović moved to Bijeljina at a young age where he later started to play basketball. He grew up playing for OKK Bijeljina. Afterwards, he moved to a Belgrade-based team Crvena zvezda of the Yugoslav First League, where he played from 1963 to 1968. His teammates in the Zvezda were Zoran Slavnić, Dragan Kapičić, Ljubodrag Simonović, Dragiša Vučinić, and Vladimir Cvetković among others. With them, he was a member of the roster that won a National Championship in the 1968–69 season, and he was posthumously awarded with the title.

== Legacy ==
Popović is considered one of the best basketball players in history of Bijeljina, by many locals. Following his death, Radnik Bijeljina has been hosted the Slobodan Popović Memorial, an exhibition basketball tournament between clubs which was held since 1971. Clubs such as Crvena zvezda, Radnik, Bosna, Radnički Beograd, OKK Beograd, and Nice competed at the event.

== See also ==
- List of basketball players who died during their careers
