= Radivoje Živković =

Serbian basketball player

Personal information
- Born: 11 October 1950 (age 76) Trnava, PR Serbia, FPR Yugoslavia
- Listed height: 2.08 m (6 ft 10 in)

Career information
- NBA draft: 1972: undrafted
- Playing career: 1968–1981
- Position: Center
- Number: 8

Career history
- 1968–1972: Borac Čačak
- 1972–1981: Crvena zvezda

Career highlights
- FIBA European Cup Winners' Cup champion (1974); Yugoslav Cup winner (1975)
Medals
Men's basketball
Representing Yugoslavia
Mediterranean Games
Gold medal – first place	1975 Algeria	Team

Radivoje Živković (Serbian Cyrillic: Радивоје Живковић; born 11 October 1950), sometimes also Radivoj, is a retired Serbian professional basketball player.

== Playing career ==
=== Borac Čačak ===
Živković played for Borac Čačak from the 1968–69 to the 1971–72 season.

=== Crvena zvezda ===
In 1972, Živković signed for Crvena zvezda of the Yugoslav First League. Due to strong transfer regulations he missed entire 1972–73 season. He made his Yugoslav League debut for Crvena zvezda on 10 November 1973 in a win against OKK Beograd.

He was a member of the 1973–74 Zvezda selection that won the 1974 FIBA European Cup Winners' Cup. He appeared in 203 games for the Zvezda during seven seasons and scored 2,838 points (13.9 PPG). Živković finished his professional career in 1981.

== National team career ==
Živković was a member of the Yugoslavia national junior team that finished 4th at the 1970 European Championship for Junior Men in Athens, Greece. Over seven tournament games, he averaged 5.9 points per game.

Živković was a member of the Yugoslavian national team that won the gold medal at the 1975 Mediterranean Games in Algeria.

== Career achievements ==
- FIBA European Cup Winners' Cup winner: 1 (with Crvena zvezda: 1973–74).
- Yugoslav Cup winner: 1 (with Crvena zvezda: 1974–75).

== See also ==
- List of KK Crvena zvezda players with 100 games played
