= List of KK Crvena zvezda head coaches =

List of Crvena zvezda coaches

KK Crvena zvezda is a men's professional basketball club based in Belgrade, Serbia. Crvena zvezda is a part of the Adriatic Basketball Association and competes in the ABA League, EuroLeague and in the Basketball League of Serbia. The Crvena zvezda squads have played in three different National Leagues since 1945, including the Yugoslav First Federal League (1945–1992), the First League of Serbia and Montenegro (1992–2006), and the Serbian League (2006 onwards). The team plays home matches in Belgrade Arena.

There have been 45 head coaches in the club's history. Montenegrin coach Dejan Radonjić is the all-time leader in both official games coached and wins. Nebojša Popović won ten National Championships, while Radonjić won five National Cups. Dejan Radonjić, Bratislav Đorđević, Duško Ivanović and Ioannis Sfairopoulos won both national titles, a Championship and a Cup. Also, Crvena zvezda won five Adriatic Leagues under Radonjić and an Adriatic Super Cup under Milan Tomić. Coaches Radonjić, Tomić and Sfairopoulos won the Adriatic Championship and the National Championship in the same season. Furthermore, Radonjić recorded three titles (Serbian League, Adriatic League, and Serbian Cup) in a single season four times (2014–15, 2016–17, 2020–21 and 2021–22), while Sfairopoulos did the same in the 2023–24 season. Coach Aleksandar Nikolić won the only European-wide competition in the club's history, the FIBA European Cup Winners' Cup in 1974.

Aleksandar Nikolić, Ranko Žeravica and Svetislav Pešić are members of FIBA Hall of Fame as coaches, while Nikolić is a member of Naismith Memorial Basketball Hall of Fame. American coach Tom Ludwig, hired in 1997, was the first foreign head coach and the only non-European. Montenegrins Radonjić and Ivanović, Slovenian Zmago Sagadin, Greek Sfairopoulos and Spaniard Ibon Navarro were the other foreign head coaches. Head coaches Vladislav Lučić and Aleksandar Trifunović were hired three times.

Head coaches Nebojša Popović, Aleksandar Gec, Milan Bjegojević, Đorđe Andrijašević, Aleksandar Nikolić, Nemanja Đurić, Strahinja Alagić, Dragiša Vučinić, Zoran Slavnić, Vladislav Lučić, Stevan Karadžić, Aleksandar Trifunović, Milenko Topić and Saša Obradović were also Crvena zvezda's players. Popović and Vučinić were player-coaches, while Popović, Bjegojević and Topić won the National Championships both as the players and head coaches.

== Key ==
| GC | Games coached |
| W | Wins |
| L | Losses |
| Win% | Winning percentage |
| # | Number of coaches^{[a]} |
| † | Elected into the FIBA Hall of Fame and the Naismith Memorial Basketball Hall of Fame as a coach |
| * | Elected into the FIBA Hall of Fame |
| | Spent entire head coaching career with Crvena zvezda |

== Coaches ==
Note: Statistics are correct through the start of the 2026–27 season.

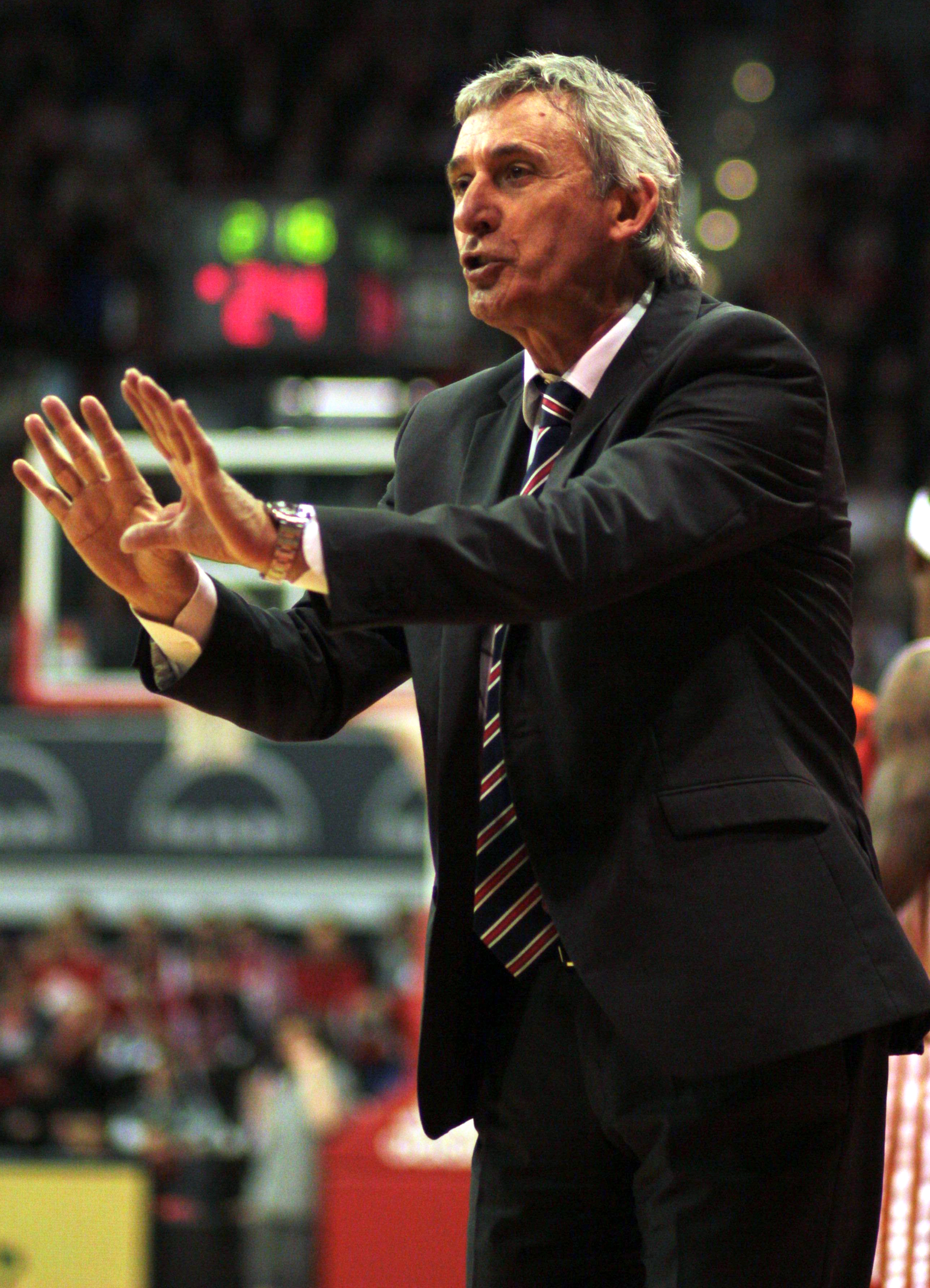
FIBA Hall of Famer Svetislav Pešić coached Crvena zvezda in two separate single season stints.

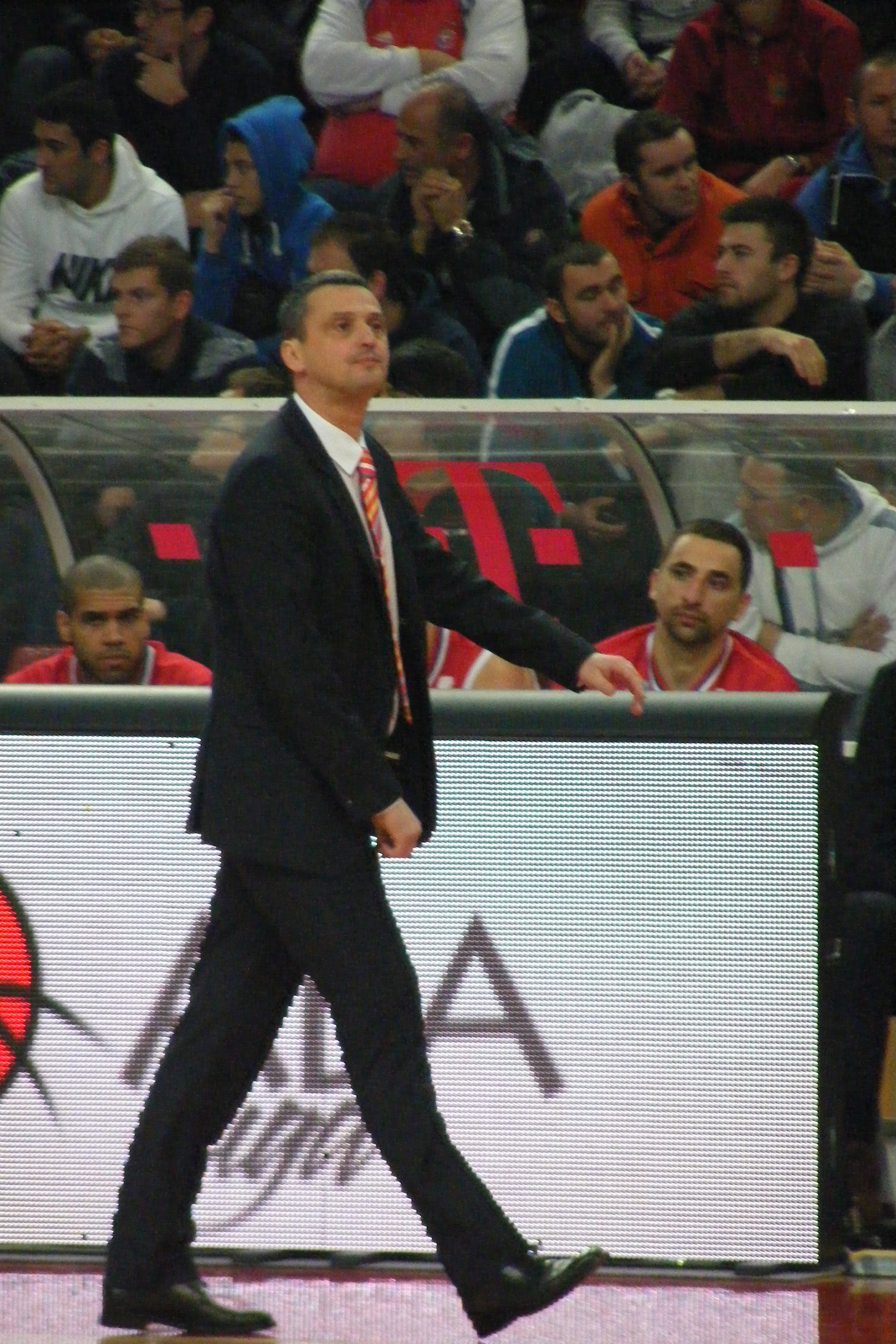
Dejan Radonjić, who coached Crvena zvezda in two stints totalling five and a half seasons, leads the club's all-time list for most games coached (453) and most games won as a coach (322).

| # | Name | Nationality^{[b]} | Period | GC | W | L | Win% | Trophies | Ref. |
|---|---|---|---|---|---|---|---|---|---|
| 1 | Nebojša Popović * | Yugoslavia | 1946–1955 | 184 | 155 | 29 | .842 | 10× Yugoslav champion | |
| 2 | Aleksandar Gec | Yugoslavia | 1956–1959 | 37 | 24 | 13 | .649 | None | |
| 3 | Milan Bjegojević | Yugoslavia | 1960–1970 | 242 | 142 | 100 | .587 | Yugoslav champion | |
| 4 | Đorđe Andrijašević | Yugoslavia | 1970–1971 | 26 | 19 | 7 | .731 | Yugoslav Cup winner | |
| 5 | Bratislav Đorđević | Yugoslavia | 1971–1973 | 78 | 56 | 22 | .718 | Yugoslav champion Yugoslav Cup winner | |
| 6 | Aleksandar Nikolić † | Yugoslavia | 1973–1974 | 41 | 29 | 12 | .707 | FIBA European Cup Winners' Cup winner | |
| 7 | Nemanja Đurić | Yugoslavia | 1974–1976 | 50 | | | | Yugoslav Cup winner | |
| 8 | Strahinja Alagić | Yugoslavia | 1976 | 20 | | | | None | |
| – | Bratislav Đorđević | Yugoslavia | 1976–1979 | 70 | | | | None | |
| 9 | Dragiša Vučinić | Yugoslavia | 1979 | 7 | | | | None | |
| 10 | Mile Protić | Yugoslavia | 1979 | 8 | | | | None | |
| 11 | Ranko Žeravica * | Yugoslavia | 1979–1986 | 265 | 160 | 105 | .604 | None | |
| 12 | Vlade Đurović | Yugoslavia | 1986–1988 | 72 | 42 | 30 | .583 | None | |
| 13 | Zoran Slavnić | Yugoslavia | 1988–1991 | 111 | 64 | 47 | .577 | None | |
| 14 | Duško Vujošević | Yugoslavia (Note: Also holds Serbian citizenship.) | 1991–1992 | 32 | 20 | 12 | .625 | None | |
| 15 | Vladislav Lučić | Serbia and Montenegro | 1992–1994 | 99 | | | | 2× Yugoslav champion | |
| 16 | Veselin Matić | Serbia and Montenegro | 1994 | 2 | | | | None | |
| – | Zoran Slavnić | Serbia and Montenegro | 1994–1995 | 32 | | | | None | |
| 17 | Mihailo Uvalin | Serbia and Montenegro | 1995 | 4 | 4 | 0 | 1.000 | None | |
| 18 | Borislav Džaković | Serbia and Montenegro | 1995–1996 | 45 | 27 | 18 | .600 | None | |
| 19 | Mihailo Pavićević | Serbia and Montenegro | 1996–1997 | 33 | 14 | 19 | .424 | None | |
| – | Ranko Žeravica * | Serbia and Montenegro | 1997 | 10 | 10 | 0 | 1.000 | None | |
| 20 | Tom Ludwig | United States | 1997 | 13 | 9 | 4 | .692 | None | (Note: Ludwig got fired in 1997 after one of the losses. His firing came before the Korać Cup round-of-32 return leg at home against Mens Sana Siena in which Red Star was chasing a 9 point deficit from the first game. The return game was played in Novi Sad because Pionir Hall was busy with something else and, led by newly arrived head coach Lučić, Red Star ended up winning by 18 points and thus overcoming the deficit and moving on to the Korać Cup round-of-16.) |
| – | Vladislav Lučić | Serbia and Montenegro | 1997–1998 | 28 | | | | None | (Note: In an unprecedented move, Lučić was fired in the early morning hours of 7 May 1998 after the game 2 loss to FMP Železnik during the ongoing YUBA League playoff finals. The series score was tied at 1-1 at the time of his firing. Red Star went on to win the series by winning next two games versus Železnik with returning head coach Pavićević at the helm and thus become the champion of FR Yugoslavia.) |
| – | Mihailo Pavićević | Serbia and Montenegro | 1998 | 5 | 4 | 1 | .800 | Yugoslav champion | (Note: Pavićević got fired 27 September 1998, two days following a 66-69 home loss on September 25 to Cibona in EuroLeague. He got replaced by his assistant Bora Džaković.) |
| – | Borislav Džaković | Serbia and Montenegro | 1998 | 9 | | | | None | (Note: Džaković got fired on 3 November 1998 after getting eliminated from the Yugoslav Cup on November 1. He didn't fare much better in EuroLeague as the club had a 0-5 record at the time of his firing.) |
| 21 | Jovica Antonić | Serbia and Montenegro | 1998–1999 | 35 | 23 | 12 | .657 | None | (Note: Antonić and Red Star parted ways on 10 October 1999. The club sat well in domestic league (two wins out of two games), but fared poorly in EuroLeague.) |
| 22 | Momir Milatović | Serbia and Montenegro | 1999 | 4 | | | | None | (Note: Milatović got fired on 8 November 1999 following a crushing defeat to FMP Železnik in the Yugoslav Cup. In total, his head coaching stay at the club was less than a month.) |
| – | Vladislav Lučić | Serbia and Montenegro | 1999–2000 | 21 | | | | None | (Note: Lučić resigned as head coach in early February 2000 after six consecutive losses in a row (2 in EuroLeague, and 4 in YUBA League). He then temporarily decided to stay after talking to club president Vojislav Stojaković. Finally, on 22 February 2000, it was decided that Lučić would stay with the club in managerial capacity while his assistant Stevan Karadžić took over as head coach.) |
| 23 | Stevan Karadžić | Serbia and Montenegro | 2000–2001 | 40 | | | | None | (Note: Karadžić got fired on 7 February 2001 following a Saporta Cup round-of-16 return leg incident in Antwerp versus Telindus RB Antwerpen where the players of two teams got into an infamous on-court brawl. Domestically, the club was in complete disarray, facing a relegation threat.) |
| 24 | Miroslav Nikolić | Serbia and Montenegro | 2001 | 9 | | | | None | |
| 25 | Zoran Krečković | Serbia and Montenegro | 2001–2002 | 8 | 4 | 4 | .500 | None | |
| – | Miroslav Nikolić | Serbia and Montenegro | 2002 | 20 | | | | None | |
| 26 | Aleksandar Trifunović | Serbia and Montenegro | 2002–2003 | 52 | 36 | 16 | .692 | None | (Note: First time coach Trifunović performed the role only formally while all coaching decisions were made by sporting director Zmago Sagadin.) |
| 27 | Zmago Sagadin | Slovenia | 2003–2004 | 65 | 41 | 24 | .631 | Serbian Cup winner | (Note: Sagadin got fired November 2, 2004 following a crushing defeat to KK Partizan in week 9 of the 2004–05 ABA Goodyear League.) |
| – | Aleksandar Trifunović | Serbia and Montenegro | 2004–2005 | 50 | 30 | 20 | .600 | None | |
| 28 | Dragan Šakota | Serbia (Note: Also holds Greek citizenship.) | 2005–2007 | 102 | 63 | 39 | .618 | Serbian Cup winner | (Note: Šakota and Red Star parted ways on 4 March 2007 following a series of losses in the Adriatic League, elimination from the domestic Cup, and quarter-final elimination from ULEB Cup. Šakota resigned wanting to be let out of his contract and the club accommodated him. His assistant Stevan Karadžić took over the main bench role.) |
| – | Stevan Karadžić | Serbia | 2007–2008 | 71 | 44 | 27 | .620 | None | (Note: Karadžić resigned on 18 April 2008, one day before the club's game against eternal rivals KK Partizan. He cited "poor situation in the club" as the reason for his decision to leave.) |
| 29 | Milan Škobalj | Serbia | 2008 | 12 | 6 | 6 | .500 | None | |
| 30 | Svetislav Pešić * | Serbia (Note: Also holds German citizenship.) | 2008–2009 | 56 | 37 | 19 | .661 | None | |
| 31 | Aleksandar Petrović | Serbia | 2009 | 18 | 9 | 9 | .500 | None | (Note: Aco Petrović resigned his post on 23 December 2009 due to difficult financial and organizational situation at the club. Aleksandar Trifunović was brought in as replacement.) |
| – | Aleksandar Trifunović | Serbia | 2009–2010 | 37 | 18 | 19 | .486 | None | |
| – | Mihailo Uvalin | Serbia | 2010–2011 | 28 | 9 | 19 | .321 | None | (Note: Mihailo Uvalin got fired mid-March 2011. His firing came on the heels of various manifestations of disarray in the club such as the players' strike due to unpaid wages and fan protests.) |
| 32 | Saša Nikitović | Serbia | 2011 | 14 | 6 | 8 | .429 | None | |
| – | Svetislav Pešić * | Serbia | 2011–2012 | 50 | 25 | 25 | .500 | None | |
| 33 | Milivoje Lazić | Serbia | 2012 | 2 | 0 | 2 | .000 | None | (Note: Milivoje Lazić got fired on 4 October 2012 after two consecutive losses in the first two games at the start of the 2012–13 ABA League. He was replaced with Vlada Vukoičić.) |
| 34 | Vlada Vukoičić | Serbia | 2012–2013 | 44 | 31 | 13 | .705 | Serbian Cup winner | |
| 35 | Dejan Radonjić | Montenegro | 2013–2017 | 326 | 239 | 87 | .733 | 3× Serbian champion 3× Serbian Cup winner 3× Adriatic champion | |
| 36 | Dušan Alimpijević | Serbia | 2017–2018 | 69 | 40 | 29 | .580 | None | |
| 37 | Milenko Topić | Serbia | 2018 | 10 | 10 | 0 | 1.000 | Serbian champion | |
| 38 | Milan Tomić | Serbia | 2018–2019 | 75 | 56 | 19 | .747 | Serbian champion Adriatic champion ABA Supercup winner | |
| 39 | Andrija Gavrilović | Serbia (Note: Also holds Italian citizenship.) | 2019 | 11 | 5 | 6 | .455 | None | |
| – | Dragan Šakota | Serbia | 2019–2020 | 35 | 20 | 15 | .571 | None | |
| 40 | Saša Obradović | Serbia | 2020 | 26 | 14 | 12 | .538 | None | |
| – | Dejan Radonjić | Montenegro | 2020–2022 | 127 | 83 | 44 | .654 | 2× Serbian champion 2× Serbian Cup winner 2× Adriatic champion | |
| 41 | Vladimir Jovanović | Serbia | 2022 | 12 | 5 | 7 | .417 | None | |
| 42 | Duško Ivanović | Montenegro | 2022–2023 | 69 | 50 | 19 | .725 | Serbian champion Serbian Cup winner | |
| 43 | Ioannis Sfairopoulos | Greece | 2023–2025 | 145 | 90 | 55 | .621 | Serbian champion 2× Serbian Cup winner Adriatic champion | |
| 44 | Tomislav Tomović | Serbia | 2025 | 1 | 1 | 0 | 1.000 | None | |
| – | Saša Obradović | Serbia | 2025–2026 | 67 | 43 | 24 | .642 | Serbian Cup winner | |
| – | Milan Tomić | Serbia | 2026 | 1 | 0 | 1 | .000 | None | |
| 45 | Ibon Navarro | Spain | 2026– | 0 | 0 | 0 | – | | |

== Head coaches with 100 games coached ==
This list includes all head coaches who have coached at least 100 games in all competitions.

Note: Statistics are correct through the start of the 2026–27 season.

| # | Name | Period | Games |
|---|---|---|---|
| 1 | (Montenegro) Dejan Radonjić | 2013–2017, 2020–2022 | 453 |
| 2 | (Socialist Federal Republic of Yugoslavia) Ranko Žeravica * | 1979–1986; 1997 | 275 |
| 3 | (Socialist Federal Republic of Yugoslavia) Milan Bjegojević | 1960–1970 | 242 |
| 4 | (Socialist Federal Republic of Yugoslavia) Nebojša Popović * | 1946–1957 | 184 |
| 5 | (Socialist Federal Republic of Yugoslavia) Bratislav Đorđević | 1971–1973; 1976–1979 | 148 |
| 5 | (Serbia and Montenegro) Vladislav Lučić | 1992–1994; 1997–1998; 1999–2000 | 148 |
| 7 | (Greece) Ioannis Sfairopoulos | 2023–2025 | 145 |
| 8 | (Socialist Federal Republic of Yugoslavia) Zoran Slavnić | 1988–1991; 1994–1995 | 143 |
| 9 | (Serbia) Aleksandar Trifunović | 2002–2003; 2004–2005; 2009–2010 | 139 |
| 10 | (Serbia) Dragan Šakota | 2005–2007; 2019–2020 | 137 |
| 11 | (Serbia) Stevan Karadžić | 2000–2001; 2007–2008 | 111 |
| 12 | (Serbia) Svetislav Pešić * | 2008–2009; 2011–2012 | 106 |

== See also ==
- List of Red Star Belgrade football coaches

== Notes ==
Former nationalities

1. Holds Bosnian-Herzegovinian nationality following dissolution of Yugoslavia.
2. Holds Serbian nationality following dissolution of Yugoslavia and Serbia and Montenegro.
3. Holds Montenegrin nationality following dissolution of Yugoslavia and Serbia and Montenegro.

Other nationalities

Other

- ^{a} A running total of the number of coaches of Crvena zvezda. Thus, any coach who has two or more separate terms as head coach is only counted once.
- ^{b} Yugoslavia includes the Federal People's Republic of Yugoslavia (1945–1963) and the Socialist Federal Republic of Yugoslavia (1963–1992), while Serbia and Montenegro includes Federal Republic of Yugoslavia (1992–2003) and State Union of Serbia and Montenegro (2003–2006).
