= Bratislav Đorđević =

Serbian basketball player and coach

Personal information
- Born: 23 October 1938 (age 88) Belgrade, Kingdom of Yugoslavia

Career information
- NBA draft: 1960: undrafted
- Playing career: 1956–1963
- Coaching career: 1964–1993

Career history

Playing
- 1956–1963: Radnički Belgrade

Coaching
- 1964–1965: Radnički Belgrade (youth)
- 1966–1967: Branik Maribor
- 1971–1973: Crvena zvezda
- Lifam Stara Pazova
- 1976–1979: Crvena zvezda
- 1979–1980: Radnički Belgrade
- 1980–1981: Apollon Patras
- 1982: Iraq
- 1983–1984: Borovo Vukovar
- 1984–1987: Al Wasl
- United Arab Emirates
- 1987–1988: Borovo Vukovar
- 1988–1990: Al Fahahil
- 1991: Profikolor BNS
- 1991–1992: Infos RTM Belgrade (associate)
- 1992–1993: Limoges (assistant)

Career highlights
- As coach: Yugoslav League champion (1972); Yugoslav Cup winner (1973)

Bratislav "Bata" Đorđević (Serbian Cyrillic: Братислав Ђорђевић; born 23 October 1938) is a Serbian former professional basketball coach and player. He was a head coach of Crvena zvezda during the 1970s. He is the father of Aleksandar Đorđević, also a professional basketball coach and former player.

== Playing career ==
Đorđević spent the entire playing career in Radnički from Belgrade which played in the Yugoslav First Basketball League.

== Coaching career ==
Đorđević began his coaching career in Radnički. But the most important success he has achieved with Crvena zvezda. He was coach of the Zvezda team that won the 1971–72 Yugoslav League title. The team included Zoran Slavnić, Dragan Kapičić, Vladimir Cvetković, and Ljubodrag Simonović among others.

During his stint with Zvezda, his son Aleksandar had started to play basketball. Aleksandar did not get a serious chance in Crvena zvezda and continued his career with rival Partizan and later become one of the best Yugoslav and Serbian basketball players.

Besides Crvena zvezda, Đorđević coached many clubs and two national teams. The most important clubs that he trained are: Radnički, Branik Maribor, IMT Belgrade, Limoges CSP.

Also, he coached the national teams of Iraq and the United Arab Emirates. At the 1982 Asian Games his team, Irag, had a 251–33 win over Yemen.

Đorđević founded the first basketball camps in Yugoslavia, in Zlatibor (1975) and Bor (1976).

== Personal life ==
In addition to his coaching career, Đorđević worked as a physical education teacher at the Marko Orešković Elementary School in New Belgrade from 1967–1971.

His brother Predrag "Buca" Đorđević is a former basketball coach.

== Coaching record ==
=== Yugoslav First Basketball League ===
Team	Year	G	W	L	W–L%	Result
Crvena zvezda	1971–72	22	17	5	.773	Champions
Crvena zvezda	1972–73	26	20	6	.769	Runner-up
Crvena zvezda	1976–77	26	15	11	.577	6th
Crvena zvezda	1977–78	26	12	14	.462	8th
Crvena zvezda	1978–79	22	9	13	.750	7th
Career					–	

== See also ==
- List of Red Star Belgrade basketball coaches
