= List of KK Crvena zvezda players with 100 games played =

List of Crvena zvezda players

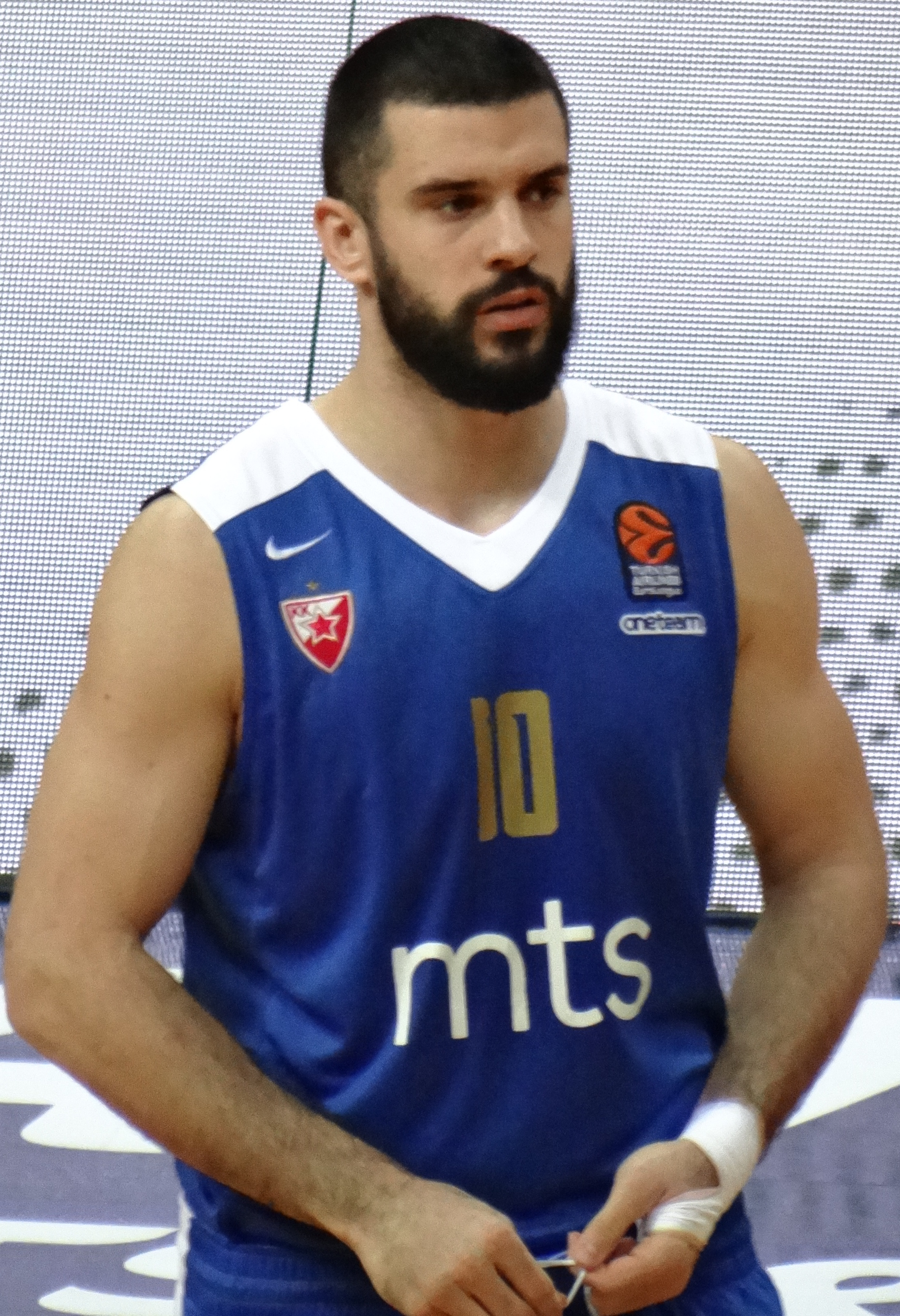
Forward Branko Lazić played the most games in club's history.

KK Crvena zvezda is a men's professional basketball club based in Belgrade, Serbia. Crvena zvezda is a part of the Adriatic Basketball Association and competes in the ABA League, EuroCup and in the Basketball League of Serbia. The team play domestic home matches in the Aleksandar Nikolić Hall, and the EuroLeague or EuroCup home matches in Štark Arena.

In March 2020, Crvena zvezda for its 75th anniversary promoted the list as members of Club 100.

This list includes all players who have played at least 100 official games for Crvena Zvezda.

== Key ==
#	Denotes current player
†	Elected into the Naismith Memorial Basketball Hall of Fame
*	Elected into the FIBA Hall of Fame
† *	Member of both the FIBA Hall of Fame and the Naismith Memorial Basketball Hall of Fame.

PG	Point guard	SG	Shooting guard	SF	Small forward	PF	Power forward	C	Center

== List ==
Note: Statistics are correct through the end of the 2021–22 season.

Player	Pos.	Nationality(ies)	Yrs	Seasons	GP	Ref.
Milutin Aleksić	F	FR Yugoslavia	2	2000–2002	110	
Đorđe Andrijašević	G	Yugoslavia	6	1950–1956	110	
Pero Antić	C	North Macedonia	3	2005–2007; 2017–2018	136	
Zufer Avdija	F	Yugoslavia	10	1979–1989	265	
Boris Bakić	G	Montenegro	4	2007–2011	168	
Billy Baron	G	United States	2	2018–2020	109	
Milan Bjegojević	G	Yugoslavia	9	1947–1955	105	
Milko Bjelica	F/C	Montenegro	7	2001–2006; 2016–2018	300	
Nemanja Bjelica	F	Serbia	2	2008–2010	102	
Jaka Blažič	G/F	Slovenia	2	2013–2015	152	
Predrag Bogosavljev	C	Yugoslavia	12	1976–1989	423	
Zlatko Bolić	G	FR Yugoslavia	5	1996–2000, 2002–2003	226	
Aleksandar Cvetković	G	Serbia	3	2010–2013	109	
Rastko Cvetković	C	FR Yugoslavia	6	1988–1993; 1998–1999	217	
Vladimir Cvetković	F	Yugoslavia	13	1959–1972	289	
Miroljub Čavić		Yugoslavia	9	1954–1962	126	
Srđan Dabić	G	Yugoslavia	7	1978–1981; 1987–1991	224	
Nemanja Dangubić	F	Serbia	4	2014–2018	236	
Dejan Davidovac	G	Serbia	3	2017–2022	301	
Ladislav Demšar	C	Yugoslavia	12	1948–1960	160	
Ognjen Dobrić #	G	Serbia	6	2016–present	368	
Milan Dozet	F	Serbia and Montenegro	3	2001–2004	124	
Tadija Dragićević	F	Serbia	6	2004–2005; 2006–2010, 2014	235	
Sreten Dragojlović	F	Yugoslavia	10	1957–1967	155	
Vladislav Dragojlović	C	Serbia and Montenegro	3	2003–2006	150	
Aleksandar Gilić	C	FR Yugoslavia	5	1988–1990; 1993–1996	113	
Vladan Grujičić		Yugoslavia	4	1974–1978	115	
Marko Gudurić	G/F	Serbia	2	2015–2017	146	
Milan Gurović	G/F	Serbia	2	2005–2007	107	
Nebojša Ilić	G	FR Yugoslavia	10	1985–1993; 1995–1997	304	
Boban Janković	F	Yugoslavia	10	1980–1990; 1991–1992	329	
Charles Jenkins	G	United States	4	2013–2015; 2016–2017; 2019–2020	278	
Goran Jeretin	G	Serbia and Montenegro	4	2002–2006	184	
Nikola Jestratijević	C	Serbia and Montenegro	5	1994–1996; 1998–2000; 2004	174	
Nikola Jokanović	G	Yugoslavia	5	1980–1985	152	
Borko Jovanović		Yugoslavia	10	1949–1958	127	
Zoran Jovanović	C	FR Yugoslavia	6	1987–1993	223	
Dragoje Jovašević		Yugoslavia	6	1973–1979	136	
Stefan Jović	G	Serbia	3	2014–2017	193	
Srđan Kalember	F	Yugoslavia	9	1945–1954	109	
Slobodan Kaličanin	F	FR Yugoslavia	5	1988–1990; 1991–1994	133	
Nikola Kalinić	F	Serbia	2	2014–2015; 2021–2022	148	
Dragan Kapičić	F	Yugoslavia	12	1965–1977	339	
Goran Karadžić	G/F	FR Yugoslavia	4	1993–1997	150	
Stevan Karadžić	G	Yugoslavia	9	1980–1989	299	
Raško Katić	C	Serbia	3	2004–2005; 2012–2014	150	
Marko Kešelj	F	Serbia	4	2008–2010; 2017–2019	149	
Elmedin Kikanović	C	Bosnia and Herzegovina	3	2007–2010	173	
Branislav Kontić		Yugoslavia	10	1956–1965	123	
Jovan Koprivica	F	Serbia and Montenegro	4	2001–2005	117	
Žarko Koprivica		Yugoslavia	7	1974–1981	185	
Mirko Kovač	F	Serbia	3	2006–2009	128	
Branko Kovačević	G/F	Yugoslavia	5	1979–1984	180	
Ognjen Kuzmić #	C	Serbia	4	2016–2017; 2019–2020; 2020–present	260	
Zoran Lazarević	F	Yugoslavia	7	1968–1975	212	
Branko Lazić #	G/F	Serbia	11	2011–present	697	
Mileta Lisica	F/C	FR Yugoslavia	3	1992–1994; 1995–1996	103	
Boban Marjanović	C	Serbia	2	2013–2015	149	
Steven Marković	G	Australia	4	2005–2008; 2009	145	
Milivoje Matić	G	Yugoslavia	11	1956–1966	164	
Mirko Milićević	C	Yugoslavia	6	1982–1988	170	
Aleksandar Milivojša	C	Yugoslavia	4	1981–1986	126	
Nenad Mišanović	C	Serbia	3	2005–2008	141	
Dejan Mišković	C	FR Yugoslavia	3	1996–1998; 2000–2001	113	
Luka Mitrović #	F	Serbia	6	2012–2017, 2021–present	329	
Nemanja Nedović	G	Serbia	4	2008–2012	131	
DeMarcus Nelson	G	United States	2	2012–2014	130	
Slobodan Nikolić	G	Yugoslavia	14	1975–1987; 1989–1991	429	
Saša Obradović	G	FR Yugoslavia	9	1987–1993; 1993–1994; 1999–2000	198	
Michael Ojo	C	Nigeria	2	2018–2020	103	
Mirko Pavlović	F	FR Yugoslavia	4	1989–1990; 1994–1997	162	
Tihomir Pavlović	F/C	Yugoslavia	9	1963–1972	185	
Božidar Pešić	C	Yugoslavia	5	1970–1975	102	
Ivo Petović	F/C	Yugoslavia	8	1983–1990	200	
Miroslav Poljak		Yugoslavia	7	1961–1971	104	
Obren Popović		Yugoslavia	11	1951–1961	136	
Petar Popović	C	Serbia	3	2000–2001; 2006–2007; 2011–2012	145	
Vuk Radivojević	G	Serbia	7	2003–2007; 2009–2010; 2011–2013	354	
Vladimir Radmanović	F	FR Yugoslavia	4	1997–2001	101	
Zoran Radović	G	Yugoslavia	9	1981–1990	270	
Miroslav Raičević	F/C	Serbia	2	2005–2006; 2007–2008	102	
Goran Rakočević	G	Yugoslavia	10	1969–1979	271	
Igor Rakočević	G	Serbia	8	1994–2000; 2003–2004; 2012–2013	324	
Nikola Rebić	G	Serbia	3	2013–2016	108	
Ivan Salaj	F	Yugoslavia	5	1978–1983	119	
Ivan Sarjanović	F	Yugoslavia	10	1967–1976	270	
Boriša Simanić	F	Serbia	5	2015–2017; 2018–2021	153	
Ljubodrag Simonović	G	Yugoslavia	10	1967–1976	263	
Marko Simonović	F	Serbia	6	2012–2014; 2015–2017; 2020–2022	388	
Zoran Slavnić *	G	Yugoslavia	11	1967–1977	304	
Aleksandar Stanimirović		Yugoslavia	7	1963–1969	114	
Jovo Stanojević	C	FR Yugoslavia	4	1996–2000	156	
Bojan Subotić	F	Serbia	2	2011–2013	108	
Vujadin Subotić	F	Montenegro	3	2004–2006; 2008; 2010–2011	157	
Mlađan Šilobad	C	FR Yugoslavia	3	1989–1991; 2002–2003	108	
Srđan Škulić		Yugoslavia	9	1963–1971	174	
Vladimir Štimac	C	Serbia	4	2008–2010; 2015–2016; 2019–2020	188	
Marko Tejić	F	Serbia	3	2013–2016	120	
Vladimir Tica	C	FR Yugoslavia	6	1998–2003; 2007	189	
Miroslav Todosijević	G	Yugoslavia	9	1963–1971	172	
Željko Topalović	C	FR Yugoslavia	2	1997–1998, 1999–2000	102	
Dejan Tomašević	C	FR Yugoslavia	5	1990–1995	151	
Aleksandar Trifunović	G	FR Yugoslavia	8	1986–1988; 1991–1997	292	
Ratomir Vićentić	C	Yugoslavia	8	1958–1965	130	
Dragoljub Vidačić	G	FR Yugoslavia	4	1992–1995; 1998–1999	170	
Čedomir Vitkovac	F	Serbia and Montenegro	3	2003–2006	173	
Dragiša Vučinić	C	Yugoslavia	13	1967–1979	354	
Rade Vukosavljević	G	Yugoslavia	6	1975–1982	114	
Nate Wolters	G	United States	2	2016–2017; 2021–2022	134	
Maik Zirbes	C	Germany	4	2014–2016; 2018–2019; 2021–2022	221	
Radivoje Živković	C	Yugoslavia	7	1973–1980	205	
Rajko Žižić	C	Yugoslavia	4	1981–1984; 1986–1987	146	
Ljupče Žugić	F/C	Yugoslavia	8	1971–1979	169	

== See also ==
- KK Crvena Zvezda all-time roster
