= Vićentić =

Vićentić is a surname. Notable people with the surname include:

- Branislav Vićentić (born 1971), Serbian basketball coach
- Ratomir Vićentić (1939–2009), Serbian professor
