= Rade Vukosavljević =

Serbian basketball player

Personal information
- Born: 22 November 1959 (age 66) Belgrade, PR Serbia, FPR Yugoslavia

Career information
- NBA draft: 1981: undrafted
- Playing career: 1975–1982
- Position: Point guard
- Number: 15

Career history
- 1975–1982: Crvena zvezda
Medals
Men's basketball
Representing Yugoslavia
European Championship for Juniors
Gold medal – first place	1976 Spain	U18 team
European Championship for Cadets
Bronze medal – third place	1975 Greece	U16 team

Radivoje "Rade" Vukosavljević (Serbian Cyrillic: Радивоје "Раде" Вукосављевић; born 22 November 1959) is a Serbian former professional basketball player.

== Early life ==
Radivoje Vukosavljević is born in Belgrade to Vojin, nicknamed Brka, who worked all his working life for the Crvena zvezda Basketball club as a janitor. Rade growing up spent time at the Zvezda's court at the Little Kalemegdan where players of the Zvezda, such as Zoran Slavnić, took their training.

== Crvena zvezda ==
Vukosavljević began with his basketball career with Crvena zvezda Youth System in 1970, joining their under-12 team with coach Vojislav Vezović. In 1975, he joined the under-16 team with coach Mile Protić. Together with his teammate Slobodan Nikolić, Vukosavljević won a Yugoslav Cadet League that year. Later that year, he joined the club's senior team.

In 1975, head coach Nemanja Đurić added him to the first team of Crvena zvezda for the 1975–76 Yugoslav League season. On 17 September 1975, Vukosavljević made his professional debut in a 109–67 win over Takovo, recording 4 points. His teammate Slavnić praised his playing style and potential at the time.

In 1978, Vukosavljević was diagnosed with a very rare disease of ossification of the spine. He also spent a month in Moscow for examinations and treatment. On 14 January 1979, it was announced that Vukosavljević would miss the rest of the 1978–79 season due to the injury. In the 1979–80 season, he was added to the Zvezda roster with head coach Ranko Žeravica. Prior the start of 1980–81 season, he lost 25 kilograms forcing him to sit out the entire season. He also spent three months in hospital treatment.

Vukosavljević returned to the team for the 1981–82 season. On 3 March 1982, Vukosavljević played his final game for Crvena zvezda in a 107–86 win over Iskra Olimpija, in what would be his retirement game. Vukosavljević retired at age 22 due to the disease. He made 114 official appearances for the club, scoring 450 points.

== National team career ==
Vukosavljević was a member of the Yugoslavia cadet team that won the bronze medal at the 1975 European Championship for Cadets in Athens and Thessaloniki, Greece. Over six tournament games, he averaged 9.7 points per game. In the third-place game, Vukosavljević scored game-high 21 points in a 74–72 win over Italy.

Vukosavljević was a member of the Yugoslavia junior team that won the gold medal at the 1976 European Championship for Juniors in Santiago de Compostela, Spain. Over eight tournament games, he averaged 9.4 points per game. In the Championship Final, Vukosavljević scored 15 points in a 92–83 win over the Soviet Union.

== See also ==
- List of KK Crvena zvezda players with 100 games played
