= 1968–69 Yugoslav First Basketball League =

- League: Yugoslav First Basketball League
- Sport: Basketball

1968-69
- Season champions: (Socialist Republic of Serbia) Crvena Zvezda

Yugoslav First Basketball League seasons
- ← 1967–68 1969–70 →

The 1968–69 Yugoslav First Basketball League season was the 25th season of the Yugoslav First Basketball League, the highest professional basketball league in SFR Yugoslavia.

== Teams ==
(Socialist Republic of Serbia) SR Serbia
- Borac Čačak
- Crvena Zvezda
- OKK Beograd
- Partizan
- Radnički Belgrade
(Socialist Republic of Croatia) SR Croatia
- Jugoplastika
- Lokomotiva
- Zadar
- Željezničar Karlovac
(Socialist Republic of Macedonia) SR Macedonia
- Rabotnički
(Socialist Republic of Slovenia) SR Slovenia
- Olimpija
- Slovan

== Prequalifying tournament ==
Four teams played qualification tournament - Borac Čačak, 11th placed team from the last season and three best placed teams from the Second division (KK Bosna withdrew from the tournament and Mladost Zagreb replaced them).

Rabotnički - Maribor 56-49; Mladost Zagreb - Maribor 81-78; Borac Čačak - Mladost Zagreb 74-68; Borac Čačak - Rabotnički 70-66; Borac Čačak - Maribor 65-53; Rabotnički - Mladost Zagreb 81-45.

1. Borac Čačak 3-0

2. Rabotnički 2-1

3. Mladost Zagreb 1-2

4. Maribor 66 0-3

== Classification ==
	Regular season ranking 1968-69	G	V	P	PF	PS	Pt
1.	Crvena Zvezda	22	19	3	1900	1647	38
2.	Olimpija	22	17	5	1967	1710	34
3.	Jugoplastika	22	16	6	1905	1735	32
4.	Zadar	22	13	9	1765	1600	26
5.	Lokomotiva	22	13	9	1856	1831	26
6.	Partizan	22	12	10	1751	1668	24
7.	Borac Čačak	22	11	11	1593	1731	22
8.	OKK Beograd	22	10	12	1618	1656	20
9.	Željezničar Karlovac	22	9	13	1519	1617	18
10.	Rabotnički	22	7	15	1583	1850	14
11.	Radnički Belgrade	22	5	17	1698	1850	10
12.	Slovan	22	0	22	1553	2088	0

The winning roster of Crvena Zvezda:

- (Socialist Federal Republic of Yugoslavia) Miroslav Todosijević
- (Socialist Federal Republic of Yugoslavia) Ivan Sarjanović
- (Socialist Federal Republic of Yugoslavia) Miroslav Poljak
- (Socialist Federal Republic of Yugoslavia) Vladimir Cvetković
- (Socialist Federal Republic of Yugoslavia) Aleksandar Stanimirović
- (Socialist Federal Republic of Yugoslavia) Dragan Kapičić
- (Socialist Federal Republic of Yugoslavia) Ljubodrag Simonović
- (Socialist Federal Republic of Yugoslavia) Dragiša Vučinić
- (Socialist Federal Republic of Yugoslavia) Srđan Škulić
- (Socialist Federal Republic of Yugoslavia) Tihomir Pavlović
- (Socialist Federal Republic of Yugoslavia) Zoran Slavnić
- (Socialist Federal Republic of Yugoslavia) Zoran Lazarević
- (Socialist Federal Republic of Yugoslavia) Dubravko Kapetanović
- (Socialist Federal Republic of Yugoslavia) Slobodan Popović
- (Socialist Federal Republic of Yugoslavia) Dragoslav Ilić

Coach: (Socialist Federal Republic of Yugoslavia) Milan Bjegojević

== Results ==
Home \ Away	CZV	OLI	JUG	ZAD	LOK	PAR	BOR	OKK	ŽKA	RAB	RAD	SLV
Crvena Zvezda	—	87–85	75–64	77–73	81–80	77–69	105–64	94–84	95–63	86–81	102–77	117–56
Olimpija	83–77	—	97–71	80–85	87–83	85–72	98–72	107–71	79–70		106–80	117–80
Jugoplastika	97–98	99–81	—	79–72	98–85	87–73	109–96	98–71	105–68	82–79	103–84	104–73
Zadar	75–76	79–72	81–80	—	75–85	71–70	90–66	94–47	81–62	70–61	81–66	97–59
Lokomotiva	102–93	88–97	91–102	80–90	—	99–93	90–73	79–77	103–73	88–83	83–79	106–96
Partizan	82–88	108–85	72–78	73–70	91–76	—	79–87	72–67		78–55	98–82	93–61
Borac Čačak	73–97	61–69	74–64	72–70		73–64	—	72–65	77–76	63–62	67–62	79–66
OKK Beograd	68–58	76–73		75–68	72–74	84–73	92–76	—	67–73	71–62	79–69	87–59
Željezničar Karlovac	73–76	65–77	73–61	69–73	61–46	59–69	89–73	61–59	—	57–54	73–72	
Rabotnički	62–66	71–76	71–72	88–74	85–72	70–71	70–71	82–71	70–57	—	90–78	76–58
Radnički Belgrade	72–74	75–88	72–78	82–89	100–92	74–80	83–78		75–70		—	96–76
Slovan	66–101	82–125	79–101	74–114	91–93	77–101	58–72	66–75	69–71	68–92	73–81	—

Source: Partizanopedia.rs
Legend: Blue = home team win; Red = away team win.
Matches with lighter background shading were decided after overtime.

== Qualification in 1969-70 season European competitions ==
FIBA European Champions Cup

- Crvena Zvezda (champions)

FIBA Cup Winner's Cup

- Lokomotiva (Cup winners)

== Basketball Cup ==
=== Bracket ===
Eightfinals
Ivangrad	61
Partizan	67
Željezničar Karlovac
Lokomotiva
Radnički Belgrade
Slovan	96
OKK Beograd	84
Zadar
Bosna	62
AŠK Olimpija	101
Crvena zvezda

Quarterfinals
Partizan	70
Željezničar Karlovac	71
Lokomotiva	109
Radnički Belgrade	94
Slovan	66
Zadar	81
AŠK Olimpija	103
Crvena zvezda	83

Semifinals
Željezničar Karlovac
Lokomotiva
Zadar
AŠK Olimpija

Finals
Lokomotiva	78
AŠK Olimpija	77
