= 1971–72 Yugoslav First Basketball League =

Yugoslav First Basketball League
- Season: 1971–72
- Duration: 6 November 1971 – 27 April 1972
- Games played: 22 each
- Teams: 12

Regular season
- Relegated: Oriolik

Finals
- Champions: Crvena zvezda
- Runners-up: Jugoplastika

Statistical leaders
Points	Radmilo Mišović	31.3

The 1971–72 Yugoslav First Basketball League season was the 28th season of the Yugoslav First Basketball League, the top-tier professional basketball league in SFR Yugoslavia.

== Notable events ==
=== Early pacesetters: Zvezda, Jugoplastika, and Lokomotiva ===
The season began on 6 November 1971 with Crvena zvezda, defending champion Jugoplastika, Lokomotiva, and Olimpija tipped as main title contenders by the observers.

Olimpija fell out of the title contention almost immediately, recording several losses in their first few games of the season while Crvena zvezda and Lokomotiva jumped to the top of the standings early on. Jugoplastika also kept pace with the standings leaders while Borac Čačak, finding success behind Radmilo Mišović's scoring exploits, and Radnički Belgrade became the early season's surprise packages.

In week 4 of the season, Crvena zvezda and Jugoplastika played a hard-fought game in Belgrade's Hala sportova with Zvezda coming out on top 98–86. In addition to highly competitive basketball and Zoran Slavnić's exceptional performance, the game is also remembered for the bench-clearing brawl that occurred with four minutes to go in the contest after Jugoplastika's point guard Rato Tvrdić punched Zvezda's shooting guard Duci Simonović.

=== Zadar vs Zvezda on Catholic Christmas 1971 ===
On Saturday, 25 December 1971, as part of the season's week 8, KK Zadar and Crvena zvezda faced off at KK Zadar's Jazine home court—a tense and incident-filled contest remembered for the extremely hostile atmosphere with nationalist and sectarian overtones directed towards the visiting team by the home fans. Scheduled to be played on Catholic Christmas—a holiday not officially celebrated in communist SFR Yugoslavia—the game featured tensions even before tip off as the visiting Crvena zvezda players and personnel had to be given police escort from the moment of their arrival in Zadar.

For the player introductions on the Jazine court prior to the game, the hosts decided to power off the arena lights with the only light in the arena provided from the thousands of candles distributed out to the gathered spectators. Following the tip off, Zadar fans began throwing the said candles onto the court, continuing to do so throughout the game while the referees—brothers Janko and Petar Kavčić from Ljubljana—didn't stop the contest out of fear of enraging the crowd even more. Among the verbal abuse hurled at Zvezda players were hate speech chants "Srbe na vrbe". With five minutes to go in the close game, Zadar's best player and leading scorer Josip Gjergja twisted his ankle by stepping on one of the candles littering the court and had to leave the contest. Zvezda ended up winning 60–61.

As soon as the game ended, Zvezda players were surrounded by police mid-court as the angry Zadar fans tried to physically accost the visiting team. Shortly, even the army had to be called in as re-enforcement in order to escort the visiting team out of the arena. In the chaos and confusion while the Zvezda players were surrounded by army recruits out on the court, a young female Zadar fan got in-between two of the soldiers guarding Zvezda players and stabbed Zvezda's shooting guard Ivan Sarjanović in the upper thigh with a compass.

== Teams ==
(Socialist Republic of Croatia) SR Croatia
- Lokomotiva
- Jugoplastika
- Oriolik
- Zadar
- Željezničar Karlovac
(Socialist Republic of Serbia) SR Serbia
- Borac Čačak
- Crvena Zvezda
- OKK Beograd
- Partizan
- Radnički Belgrade
(Socialist Republic of Macedonia) SR Macedonia
- Rabotnički
(Socialist Republic of Slovenia) SR Slovenia
- Olimpija

== League table ==
Pos	Team	Pld	W	L	PF	PA	PD	Pts	Qualification or relegation
1	Jugoplastika	22	17	5	1928	1736	+192	39	Advance to single game title playoff
2	Crvena zvezda	22	17	5	1986	1832	+154	39	Advance to single game title playoff
3	Lokomotiva	22	14	8	1956	1874	+82	36	
4	Radnički Beograd	22	14	8	2007	1955	+52	36	
5	Rabotnički	22	11	11	1769	1752	+17	33	
6	Partizan	22	11	11	1810	1802	+8	33	
7	Olimpija	22	10	12	1917	1863	+54	32	
8	OKK Beograd	22	10	12	1758	1763	−5	32	
9	Borac Čačak	22	9	13	1964	1951	+13	31	
10	Zadar	22	7	15	1793	1926	−133	29	
11	Željezničar Karlovac	22	7	15	1743	1913	−170	29	
12	Oriolik	22	5	17	1621	1885	−264	27	Relegation to the First B League

Source: Strategija

== Results ==
Home \ Away	JUG	CZV	LOK	RAD	RAB	PAR	OLI	OKK	BOR	ZAD	ŽKA	ORI
Jugoplastika	—	93–92	64–77	97–68	100–74	68–64	104–84	89–77	99–79	79–74	116–100	109–68
Crvena Zvezda	98–86	—	109–89	103–99	81–75	101–85	96–93	99–83	98–87	105–85	109–91	91–82
Lokomotiva	91–84	84–89	—	86–75		83–88	95–93	81–75	78–76	110–103	98–77	111–70
Radnički Belgrade	83–86	94–96	113–104	—	108–93	102–86		96–87		82–73		111–86
Rabotnički	69–71	68–65	84–72	80–82	—	83–77	103–86	62–61	92–90		114–81	101–73
Partizan	95–98	78–80	82–73	80–83	72–66	—	102–92	82–76	90–89	93–72	89–71	78–70
Olimpija	74–70		92–88	104–78	98–83	99–92	—	72–84	88–77		104–85	102–69
OKK Beograd	70–82	83–80	85–87	106–96	73–75	81–72	87–77	—	88–73	79–77	73–75	81–69
Borac Čačak	89–81	89–86	106–84		100–88	88–80	101–96	78–85	—	121–96	101–77	102–93
Zadar	88–100	60–61	97–102		82–77	80–65	88–84	81–91	87–86	—		99–88
Željezničar Karlovac	61–85	87–96			68–67	84–86	73–67	76–70	79–70	80–75	—	81–61
Oriolik	61–67		74–83	75–95	63–64	63–74	76–65	72–75	78–77	74–68	87–80	—

Source: Partizanopedia.rs
Legend: Blue = home team win; Red = away team win.
Matches with lighter background shading were decided after overtime.

== Single-game title playoff ==
Due to Crvena Zvezda and Jugoplastika being tied for the top spot with identical 17–5 records at the end of the season, the champion was decided in a one-game playoff between the two teams since, as stipulated by the Basketball Federation of Yugoslavia regulations, points difference wasn't legitimate criteria to determine a league champion in case of a tie at the top. The regulations further stated that the deciding game's venue had to be neutral and mutually agreed upon between the two teams. Crvena Zvezda requested Sarajevo while Jugoplastika wanted Ljubljana. Due to the teams' inability to agree, the venue was decided by coin toss that was won by Jugoplastika.

Accordingly, the game ended up being played in Ljubljana's Tivoli Hall on Thursday, 27 April 1972. In a close game (Jugoplastika was up by four 35–39 at halftime), Zvezda's playmaker Zoran Slavnić hit a shot within final thirty seconds for a 67–67 tie at the end of regulation. Zvezda ended up winning 75–70 largely behind Zoran Lazarević's 12 points, all of which he scored towards the end of regulation and in overtime.

27 April 1972
20:30

Boxscore

Crvena Zvezda (Socialist Federal Republic of Yugoslavia)	75–70 (OT)	(Socialist Federal Republic of Yugoslavia) Jugoplastika
Scoring by half: 35–39, 32–28 Overtime: 8–3
Pts: Simonović 20		Pts: Šolman 18

Tivoli Hall, Ljubljana
Attendance: 4,500
Referees: Brumen (Ljubljana), Popovski (Titov Veles)

Starters:			Pts	Reb	Ast
PG	15	(Socialist Federal Republic of Yugoslavia) Zoran Slavnić	17		
SG	11	(Socialist Federal Republic of Yugoslavia) Ljubodrag Simonović	20		
SF	10	(Socialist Federal Republic of Yugoslavia) Dragan Kapičić	8		
PF	5	(Socialist Federal Republic of Yugoslavia) Zoran Lazarević	12		
C	12	(Socialist Federal Republic of Yugoslavia) Dragiša Vučinić	15		
Reserves:					
PG	4	(Socialist Federal Republic of Yugoslavia) Goran Rakočević	0		
SF	6	(Socialist Federal Republic of Yugoslavia) Ivan Sarjanović	6		
C	7	(Socialist Federal Republic of Yugoslavia) Božidar Pešić	0		
SF	8	(Socialist Federal Republic of Yugoslavia) Vladimir Cvetković	0		
F/C	9	(Socialist Federal Republic of Yugoslavia) Zoran Latifić	0		
F/C	13	(Socialist Federal Republic of Yugoslavia) Ljupče Žugić	0		
C	14	(Socialist Federal Republic of Yugoslavia) Tihomir Pavlović	0		
Head coach:
(Basketball Federation of Yugoslavia) Bratislav Đorđević

Crvena zvezda	Jugoplastika

1971–72 Yugoslav First Basketball League Champions

Crvena zvezda
12th title

Starters:			Pts	Reb	Ast
PG	10	(Socialist Federal Republic of Yugoslavia) Ratomir Tvrdić	6		
SG	8	(Socialist Federal Republic of Yugoslavia) Branko Macura	7		
SF	12	(Socialist Federal Republic of Yugoslavia) Damir Šolman	18		
PF	13	(Socialist Federal Republic of Yugoslavia) Duje Krstulović	0		
C	15	(Socialist Federal Republic of Yugoslavia) Petar Skansi	15		
Reserves:					
PG	4	(Socialist Federal Republic of Yugoslavia) Drago Peterka	6		
C	6	(Socialist Federal Republic of Yugoslavia) Mihajlo Manović	11		
PF	7	(Socialist Federal Republic of Yugoslavia) Ivo Škarić	0		
SF	9	(Socialist Federal Republic of Yugoslavia) Zoran Grašo	0		
C	11	(Socialist Federal Republic of Yugoslavia) Lovre Tvrdić	0		
C	14	(Socialist Federal Republic of Yugoslavia) Zdenko Prug	0		
Head coach:
(Basketball Federation of Yugoslavia) Branko Radović

== Winning Roster ==
The winning roster of Crvena Zvezda:

- (Socialist Federal Republic of Yugoslavia) Goran Rakočević
- (Socialist Federal Republic of Yugoslavia) Zoran Lazarević
- (Socialist Federal Republic of Yugoslavia) Ivan Sarjanović
- (Socialist Federal Republic of Yugoslavia) Božidar Pešić
- (Socialist Federal Republic of Yugoslavia) Vladimir Cvetković
- (Socialist Federal Republic of Yugoslavia) Života Bogosavljević
- (Socialist Federal Republic of Yugoslavia) Dragan Kapičić
- (Socialist Federal Republic of Yugoslavia) Ljubodrag Simonović
- (Socialist Federal Republic of Yugoslavia) Dragiša Vučinić
- (Socialist Federal Republic of Yugoslavia) Zoran Latifić
- (Socialist Federal Republic of Yugoslavia) Tihomir Pavlović
- (Socialist Federal Republic of Yugoslavia) Zoran Slavnić
- (Socialist Federal Republic of Yugoslavia) Risto Kubura
- (Socialist Federal Republic of Yugoslavia) Ljupče Žugić
- (Socialist Federal Republic of Yugoslavia) Bogosav Stefanović

Coach: (Socialist Federal Republic of Yugoslavia) Bratislav Đorđević

== Qualification in 1972-73 season European competitions ==
FIBA European Champions Cup

- Crvena Zvezda (champions)

FIBA Cup Winner's Cup

- Jugoplastika (Cup winners)

FIBA Korać Cup

- Lokomotiva (3rd)
- Rabotnički (5th)

== Basketball Cup ==
=== Bracket ===
Eightfinals
Kombinat Zrenjanin	77
Lokomotiva	81
Željezničar Sarajevo	64
Oriolik	68
Crvena zvezda	83
OKK Beograd	74
Radnički Belgrade	78
Partizan	70
Olimpija	88
Borac Čačak	83
Jugoplastika	79
Rabotnički	74
Kvarner	71
Borac Banja Luka	66
Akademik Titograd	56
Vrhnika	78

Quarterfinals
Lokomotiva	106
Oriolik	88
Crvena zvezda	93
Radnički Belgrade	75
Olimpija	90
Jugoplastika	102
Kvarner	94
Vrhnika	75

Semifinals
Lokomotiva	92
Crvena zvezda	89
Jugoplastika
Kvarner

Finals
Lokomotiva	88
Jugoplastika	81
