= Libertas Pallacanestro Asti =

Libertas Pallacanestro Asti was a professional basketball club based in Asti, Italy.

== History ==
Libertas Asti was founded in 1954 and under the sponsorship of Saclà, passed from Serie D to Serie A in five years with the Hungarian coach Lajos Tóth. In the first participation in the premier league of the 1972–73 Serie A Saclà Asti was ranked in eighth place, also it reached the final of the Italian Cup and defeated by Ignis Varese, and getting access to the FIBA European Cup Winners' Cup. In the 1973–74 season, due to the unavailability of a gambling facility approved for the Cup Winners' Cup, Saclà played its home games at PalaRuffini of Turin, finishing in sixth place. The shame season the club played in the 1973–74 FIBA European Cup Winners' Cup and reached to play in the semifinals where it excluded by the Czech powerhouse Spartak ZJŠ Brno (86–70 win in Turin, 71–88 defeat in Brno).

At the end of the season, remaining the unavailability of a suitable arena, Libertas established a twinning agreement with Auxilium Torino presided over by Fr. Gino Borgogno (accepted by the League to the Championship of Basketball Series A2 of the new institution), with which they moved into Turin-based club the best elements of the first team (as Dante Anconetani, John Laing, Alberto embattled, Brown Edge, Romeo Sacchetti, etc.), the coach Lajos Tóth, the managerial staff and Saclà sponsors, while Charlie Caglieris, considered the " flag "of the team, was sold for budgetary reasons to Fortitudo Bologna. The club Asti then decided to give up the Series A1 and the Series B share with a team mainly made up of players from the youth sector of the Auxilium Torino.

After just one year in Serie B the company disbanded (1976).

== Honours ==
- Italian Cup

Runners-up (1): 1972–73

== In European and worldwide competitions ==
=== Match table ===
Record	Round	Opponent club		
1973–74 FIBA European Cup Winners' Cup 2nd–tier
7–3	1st round	(Switzerland) Pregassona	115–47 h	91–77 a
7–3	2nd round	(Turkey) TED Ankara Kolejliler	79–43 a	89–51 h
7–3	QF	(Bulgaria) CSKA Sofia	75–59 h	83–75 a
7–3	QF	(Socialist Federal Republic of Yugoslavia) Crvena zvezda	86–93 a	87–88 h
7–3	SF	(Czechoslovakia) Spartak ZJŠ Brno	86–70 h	71–88 a
