= Andrey Makeyev =

Soviet basketball player (1952–2021)

Personal information
- Born: 3 February 1952 Petrozavodsk, Karelo-Finnish SSR, Soviet Union
- Died: 13 September 2021 (aged 69) Saint Petersburg, Russia
Medal record
Men's basketball
Representing the Soviet Union
Olympic Games
| Bronze medal – third place | 1976 Montreal | Team competition |
European U-18 Championship
| Gold medal – first place | 1970 Greece | Team |

Andrey Gennadyevich Makeyev (alternate spellings: Andrei Makeev Genievich, Russian: Андрей Геннадьевич Макеев; 3 February 1952 – 13 September 2021) was a Soviet basketball player who competed for the Soviet Union in the 1976 Summer Olympics and won a bronze medal.
