= Goran Rakočević =

Serbian basketball player (1951–2026)

Personal information
- Born: 1 March 1951 Belgrade, PR Serbia, FPR Yugoslavia
- Died: 2 July 2026 (aged 75)
- Listed height: 1.81 m (5 ft 11 in)
- Listed weight: 76 kg (168 lb)

Career information
- NBA draft: 1973: undrafted
- Playing career: 1969–1979
- Position: Point guard
- Number: 4, 14

Career history
- 1969–1979: Crvena zvezda

Career highlights
- European Cup Winners' Cup champion (1974); Yugoslav League champion (1972); 3× Yugoslav Cup winner (1971, 1973, 1975)
Medals
Men's basketball
Representing Yugoslavia
Mediterranean Games
Gold medal – first place	1975 Algeria	Team

Goran Rakočević (Serbian Cyrillic: Горан Ракочевић; 1 March 1951 – 2 July 2026) was a Serbian professional basketball player. He is the father of Igor Rakočević, a Serbian professional basketball executive and former player.

== Playing career ==
Rakočević spent entire playing career in Crvena zvezda of the Yugoslav Basketball League, where he played during 1970s. His teammates were Zoran Slavnić, Dragan Kapičić, Ljubodrag Simonović, Dragiša Vučinić and Vladimir Cvetković among others. With them he won the National Championships, three National Cups and the 1974 FIBA European Cup Winners' Cup (nowadays Saporta Cup).

== National team career ==
Rakočević was a member of the Yugoslavian national team that won the gold medal at the 1975 Mediterranean Games in Algeria. During his career he played 17 games for the national team.

== Career achievements ==
- FIBA European Cup Winners' Cup winner: 1 (with Crvena zvezda: 1973–74).
- Yugoslav League champion: 1 (with Crvena zvezda: 1971–72).
- Yugoslav Cup winner: 3 (with Crvena zvezda: 1970–71, 1972–73, 1974–75).

== Personal life and death ==
Rakočević married Vesna Strahinjić and they have a son and a daughter Jelena. His son Igor is a former professional basketball player who started his career in Crvena zvezda, also. Igor is a two-time All-Euroleague Team member and three-time Alphonso Ford Trophy winner and won 2002 FIBA World Championship and 2001 EuroBasket representing FR Yugoslavia national team. Rakočević died on 2 July 2026, at the age of 75.

== See also ==
- List of father-and-son combinations who have played for Crvena zvezda
- List of KK Crvena zvezda players with 100 games played
