= FIBA Saporta Cup =

Defunct basketball cup competition

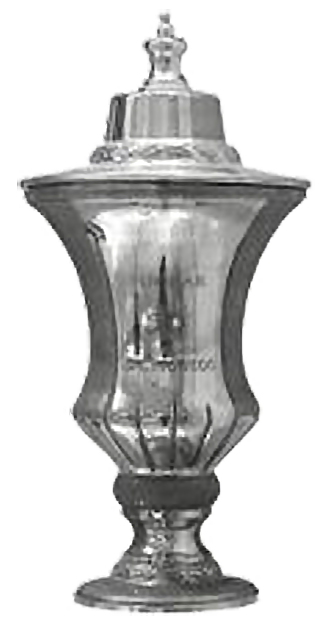
- The FIBA Saporta Cup's championship trophy
- Organising body: FIBA Europe
- Founded: 1966; 60 years ago
- First season: FIBA European Cup Winners Cup; 1966–67; FIBA European Cup; 1991–92; FIBA EuroCup; 1996–97; FIBA Saporta Cup; 1998–99
- Folded: 2002; 24 years ago
- Region: Europe
- Level on pyramid: 2
- Last champions: (Italy) Montepaschi Siena (1st title) (2001–02)
- Most championships: (Spain) Real Madrid (Italy) Cantù (4 titles each)

The FIBA Saporta Cup, founded as FIBA European Cup Winners Cup, was the name of the second-tier level European-wide professional club basketball competition, where the domestic National Cup winners, from all over Europe, played against each other. The competition was organized by FIBA Europe. It was named after the late Raimundo Saporta, a former Real Madrid director.

== History ==
The competition was created in 1966, as the FIBA European Cup Winners Cup, but it had several denominations, until its eventual folding in 2002:

- 1966–67 to 1990–91 FIBA European Cup Winners Cup
- 1991–92 to 1995–96 FIBA European Cup
- 1996–97 to 1997–98 FIBA EuroCup
- 1998–99 to 2001–02 FIBA Saporta Cup

The final Saporta Cup season was held during the 2001–02 season. After that, it was fused with the FIBA Korać Cup, into the formed FIBA Europe Champions Cup.

== Finals ==
Year	Final			Semifinalists	
Year	Champion	Score	Second place	Third	
1966–67; Details	(Italy); Ignis Varese	144–135 (77–67 / 68–67)	(Israel); Maccabi Tel Aviv	(Czechoslovakia); Spartak ZJŠ Brno	(Bulgaria); Botev
1967–68; Details	(Greece); AEK	89–82	(Czechoslovakia); Slavia VŠ Praha	(Italy); Ignis Varese	(East Germany); Vorwärts Leipzig
1968–69; Details	(Czechoslovakia); Slavia VŠ Praha	80–74	(Soviet Union); Dinamo Tbilisi	(Socialist Federal Republic of Yugoslavia); AŠK Olimpija	(Greece); Panathinaikos
1969–70; Details	(Italy); Fides Napoli	147–129 (64–60 / 87–65)	(France); JA Vichy	(Soviet Union); Dinamo Tbilisi	(Greece); AEK
1970–71; Details	(Italy); Simmenthal Milano	127–118 (66–56 / 71–52)	(Soviet Union); Spartak Leningrad	(Italy); Fides Napoli	(Spain); Juventud Nerva
1971–72; Details	(Italy); Simmenthal Milano	74–70	(Socialist Federal Republic of Yugoslavia); Crvena zvezda	(Italy); Fides Napoli	(Spain); Juventud Schweppes
1972–73; Details	(Soviet Union); Spartak Leningrad	77–62	(Socialist Federal Republic of Yugoslavia); Jugoplastika	(Spain); Juventud Schweppes	(Italy); Mobilquattro Milano
1973–74; Details	(Socialist Federal Republic of Yugoslavia); Crvena zvezda	86–75	(Czechoslovakia); Spartak ZJŠ Brno	(Spain); Estudiantes Monteverde	(Italy); Saclà Asti
1974–75; Details	(Soviet Union); Spartak Leningrad	63–62	(Socialist Federal Republic of Yugoslavia); Crvena zvezda	(Bulgaria); CSKA Septemvriisko zname	(Socialist Federal Republic of Yugoslavia); Jugoplastika
1975–76; Details	(Italy); Cinzano Milano	88–73	(France); ASPO Tours	(Socialist Federal Republic of Yugoslavia); Rabotnički	(Spain); Estudiantes Monteverde
1976–77; Details	(Italy); Birra Forst Cantù	87–86	(Socialist Federal Republic of Yugoslavia); Radnički Belgrade	(Italy); Cinzano Milano	(Spain); Juventud Schweppes
1977–78; Details	(Italy); Gabetti Cantù	84–82	(Italy); Sinudyne Bologna	(France); Caen BC	(Spain); FC Barcelona
1978–79; Details	(Italy); Gabetti Cantù	83–73	(Netherlands); EBBC	(Spain); FC Barcelona	(Italy); Sinudyne Bologna
1979–80; Details	(Italy); Emerson Varese	90–88	(Italy); Gabetti Cantù	(Netherlands); Parker Leiden	(Spain); FC Barcelona
1980–81; Details	(Italy); Squibb Cantù	86–82	(Spain); FC Barcelona	(Italy); Turisanda Varese	(Socialist Federal Republic of Yugoslavia); Cibona
1981–82; Details	(Socialist Federal Republic of Yugoslavia); Cibona	96–95	(Spain); Real Madrid	(Soviet Union); Stroitel	(Italy); Sinudyne Bologna
1982–83; Details	(Italy); Scavolini Pesaro	111–99	(France); ASVEL	(Socialist Federal Republic of Yugoslavia); ZZI Olimpija	(Netherlands); Nashua EBBC
1983–84; Details	(Spain); Real Madrid	82–81	(Italy); Simac Milano	(Socialist Federal Republic of Yugoslavia); Cibona	(Italy); Scavolini Pesaro
1984–85; Details	(Spain); FC Barcelona	77–73	(Soviet Union); Žalgiris	(Spain); CAI Zaragoza	(France); ASVEL
1985–86; Details	(Spain); FC Barcelona	101–86	(Italy); Scavolini Pesaro	(Soviet Union); CSKA Moscow	(Spain); Ron Negrita Joventut
1986–87; Details	(Socialist Federal Republic of Yugoslavia); Cibona	89–74	(Italy); Scavolini Pesaro	(France); ASVEL	(Soviet Union); CSKA Moscow
1987–88; Details	(France); Limoges CSP	96–89	(Spain); Ram Joventut	(Italy); Scavolini Pesaro	(West Germany); Bayer 04 Leverkusen
1988–89; Details	(Spain); Real Madrid	117–113	(Italy); Snaidero Caserta	(Socialist Federal Republic of Yugoslavia); Cibona	(Soviet Union); Žalgiris
1989–90; Details	(Italy); Knorr Bologna	79–74	(Spain); Real Madrid	(Greece); PAOK	(Soviet Union); Žalgiris
1990–91; Details	(Greece); PAOK	76–72	(Spain); CAI Zaragoza	(Soviet Union); Dynamo Moscow	(France); Pitch Cholet
1991–92; Details	(Spain); Real Madrid Asegurator	65–63	(Greece); PAOK	(Italy); Glaxo Verona	(Slovenia); Smelt Olimpija
1992–93; Details	(Greece); Sato Aris	50–48	(Turkey); Efes Pilsen	(Spain); NatWest Zaragoza	(Israel); Hapoel Galil Elyon
1993–94; Details	(Slovenia); Smelt Olimpija	91–81	(Spain); Taugrés	(Greece); Sato Aris	(France); Pitch Cholet
1994–95; Details	(Italy); Benetton Treviso	94–86	(Spain); Taugrés	(France); Olympique Antibes	(Greece); Iraklis Aspis Pronoia
1995–96; Details	(Spain); Taugrés	88–81	(Greece); PAOK	(Russia); Dynamo Moscow	(Lithuania); Žalgiris
1996–97; Details	(Spain); Real Madrid Teka	78–64	(Italy); Mash Jeans Verona	(France); PSG Racing	(Greece); Iraklis
1997–98; Details	(Lithuania); Žalgiris	82–67	(Italy); Stefanel Milano	(Russia); Avtodor Saratov	(Greece); Panathinaikos
1998–99; Details	(Italy); Benetton Treviso	64–60	(Spain); Pamesa Valencia	(Federal Republic of Yugoslavia); Budućnost	(Greece); Aris
1999–00; Details	(Greece); AEK	83–76	(Italy); Kinder Bologna	(Croatia); Zadar	(Lithuania); Lietuvos rytas
2000–01; Details	(Greece); Maroussi	74–72	(France); Élan Chalon	(Russia); UNICS	(Spain); Pamesa Valencia
2001–02; Details	(Italy); Montepaschi Siena	81–71	(Spain); Pamesa Valencia	(Israel); Hapoel Jerusalem	(Poland); Anwil Włocławek

== Titles by club ==
Club	Title(s)	Runners-up	Champion years
(Spain) Real Madrid	4	2	1984, 1989, 1992, 1997
(Italy) Cantù	4	1	1977, 1978, 1979, 1981
(Italy) Olimpia Milano	3	2	1971, 1972, 1976
(Soviet Union) Spartak Leningrad	2	1	1973, 1975
(Spain) FC Barcelona	2	1	1985, 1986
(Italy) Varese	2	0	1967, 1980
(Greece) AEK	2	0	1968, 2000
(Socialist Federal Republic of Yugoslavia) Cibona	2	0	1982, 1987
(Italy) Treviso	2	0	1995, 1999
(Socialist Federal Republic of Yugoslavia) Crvena zvezda	1	2	1974
(Italy) Victoria Libertas	1	2	1983
(Italy) Virtus Bologna	1	2	1990
(Greece) PAOK	1	2	1991
(Spain) Baskonia	1	2	1996
(Czechoslovakia) USK Praha	1	1	1969
(Soviet Union) (Lithuania) Žalgiris	1	1	1998
(Italy) Partenope Napoli	1	0	1970
(France) Limoges CSP	1	0	1988
(Greece) Aris	1	0	1993
(Slovenia) Olimpija	1	0	1994
(Greece) Maroussi	1	0	2001
(Italy) Mens Sana 1871	1	0	2002
(Spain) Valencia	0	2	—
(Israel) Maccabi Tel Aviv	0	1	—
(Soviet Union) Dinamo Tbilisi	0	1	—
(France) JA Vichy	0	1	—
(Socialist Federal Republic of Yugoslavia) Split	0	1	—
(Czechoslovakia) Brno	0	1	—
(France) ASPO Tours	0	1	—
(Socialist Federal Republic of Yugoslavia) Radnički Belgrade	0	1	—
(Netherlands) Den Bosch	0	1	—
(France) ASVEL	0	1	—
(Spain) Joventut Badalona	0	1	—
(Italy) JuveCaserta	0	1	—
(Spain) Zaragoza	0	1	—
(Turkey) Anadolu Efes	0	1	—
(Italy) Scaligera Verona	0	1	—
(France) Élan Chalon	0	1	—

== Titles by nation ==
Country	Club	Title(s)	Runners-up
Italy
Italy	Cantù	4	1
Italy	Olimpia Milano	3	2
Italy	Varese	2	0
Italy	Treviso	2	0
Italy	Victoria Libertas	1	2
Italy	Virtus Bologna	1	2
Italy	Partenope Napoli	1	0
Italy	Mens Sana 1871	1	0
Italy	JuveCaserta	0	1
Italy	Scaligera Verona	0	1
Italy	10 clubs	15	9
Spain
Spain	Real Madrid	4	2
Spain	FC Barcelona	2	1
Spain	Baskonia	1	2
Spain	Valencia	0	2
Spain	Joventut Badalona	0	1
Spain	Zaragoza	0	1
Spain	6 clubs	7	9
Greece
Greece	AEK	2	0
Greece	PAOK	1	2
Greece	Aris	1	0
Greece	Maroussi	1	0
Greece	4 clubs	5	2
(Socialist Federal Republic of Yugoslavia) Yugoslavia*
(Socialist Federal Republic of Yugoslavia) Yugoslavia*	Cibona	2	0
(Socialist Federal Republic of Yugoslavia) Yugoslavia*	Crvena zvezda	1	2
(Socialist Federal Republic of Yugoslavia) Yugoslavia*	Split	0	1
(Socialist Federal Republic of Yugoslavia) Yugoslavia*	Radnički Belgrade	0	1
(Socialist Federal Republic of Yugoslavia) Yugoslavia*	4 clubs	3	4
Soviet Union*
Soviet Union*	Spartak Leningrad	2	1
Soviet Union*	Žalgiris	0	1
Soviet Union*	Dinamo Tbilisi	0	1
Soviet Union*	3 clubs	2	3
France
France	Limoges CSP	1	0
France	JA Vichy	0	1
France	ASPO Tours	0	1
France	ASVEL	0	1
France	Élan Chalon	0	1
France	5 clubs	1	4
Czechoslovakia*	USK Praha	1	1
Czechoslovakia*	Brno	0	1
Czechoslovakia*	2 clubs	1	2
Slovenia	Olimpija	1	0
Lithuania	Žalgiris	1	0
Israel	Maccabi Tel Aviv	0	1
Netherlands	Den Bosch	0	1
Turkey	Anadolu Efes	0	1

- Countries marked with an asterisk no longer exist.

== Statistical leaders per season ==
=== Top scorers ===
Since the beginning of the 1986–87 season (Total points per season):

- 1986–87 (Socialist Federal Republic of Yugoslavia) Drazen Petrovic (Cibona Zagreb): 233
- 1987–88 (United States) Don Collins (Limoges): 325
- 1988–89 (Socialist Federal Republic of Yugoslavia) Drazen Petrovic (Real Madrid): 366
- 1989–90 (Socialist Federal Republic of Yugoslavia) (Greece) Bane Prelevic (PAOK): 241
- 1990–91 (Socialist Federal Republic of Yugoslavia) (Greece) Bane Prelevic (PAOK): 283

Since the beginning of the 1991–92 season (Points Per Game):

- 1991–92 (Socialist Federal Republic of Yugoslavia) (Greece) Bane Prelevic (PAOK): 25.6
- 1992–93 (United States) Roy Tarpley (Aris Salonica): 25.6
- 1993–94 (Bulgaria) Georgi Mladenov (Levski Sofia): 30.3
- 1994–95 (United States) Walter Berry (Iraklis Salonica): 28.4
- 1995–96 (Poland) Igor Griszczuk (Nobiles Włocławek ): 26.9
- 1996–97 (Bulgaria) Georgi Mladenov (Plama Pleven): 29.3
- 1997–98 (United States) (Poland) Eric Elliot (Plannja Lulea): 25.9
- 1998–99 (United States) Kenya Capers (Stahlbau Oberwart): 25
- 1999–00 (United States) Mike Doyle (Okapi Aalst): 24.9
- 2000–01 (Canada) (Jamaica) Rowan Barrett (Keravnos Keo Nicosia): 23.6
- 2001–02 (Greece) Georgios Diamantopoulos (Panionios Smyrna): 22.6

=== Most rebounds ===
Since the beginning of the 1991–92 season (Rebounds Per Game):

- 1991–92 (Germany) Uwe Blab (Alba Berlin): 10.6
- 1992–93 (United States) Roy Tarpley (Aris Thessaloniki): 14.9
- 1993–94 (United States) Michael Gibson (Hapoel Galil Elyon): 11.1
- 1994–95 (United States) Kenny Green (Taugres Vitoria): 12.5
- 1995–96 (United States) Ikie Corbin (Nobiles Wloclawek): 11.1
- 1996–97 (United States) Dallas Comegys (Fenerbahce Istanbul): 12
- 1997–98 (United States) Joseph McNaull (Slask Wroclaw): 11.8
- 1998–99 (United States) Charles Newborn (UKJ SUBA St.Polten): 12.3
- 1999–00 (United States) Daren Engellant (Okapi Aalst): 12.5
- 2000–01 (Bulgaria) Vasco Evtimov (Maroussi Athens): 1.5
- 2001–02 Ante Grgurevic (Croatia Insurance Split): 11.2

=== Most assists ===
Since the beginning of the 1991–92 season (Assists Per Game):

- 1991–92 (Bosnia and Herzegovina) Emir Mutapcic (Alba Berlin): 4.4
- 1992–93 (France) Antoine Rigaudeau (Pitch Cholet): 4.5
- 1993–94 (Spain) Pablo Laso (Taugres Vitoria): 9.3
- 1994–95 (Spain) Pablo Laso (Taugres Vitoria): 6.8
- 1995–96 (Russia) (Greece) Sergei Bazarevich (Dynamo Moscow): 8
- 1996–97 (Portugal) Rui Amorim (FC Porto): 7.2
- 1997–98 (Russia) Evgeni Pashutin (Avtodor Saratov): 8.8
- 1998–99 (United States) Corey Gaines (Hapoel Eilat): 5.8
- 1999–00 (United States) Elmer Bennett (TAU Ceramica Vitoria): 7.6
- 2000–01 (Latvia) Roberts Stelmahers (Pinar Karsiyaka İzmir): 6.6
- 2001–02 (United States) Terrence Rencher (Telekom Baskets Bonn): 6.2

== Winning rosters ==
=== FIBA European Cup Winners Cup ===
- 1966–67 (Italy) Ignis Varese

Stan McKenzie, Sauro Bufalini, Dino Meneghin, Giambattista Cescutti, Ottorino Flaborea, Massimo Villetti, Paolo Vittori, Enrico Bovone, Pierangelo Gergati, Roberto Gergati (Head coach: Vittorio Tracuzzi)

- 1967–68 (Greece) AEK

Georgios Amerikanos, Georgios Trontzos, Christos Zoupas, Stelios Vasileiadis, Eas Larentzakis, Antonis Christeas, Lakis Tsavas, Petros Petrakis, Nikos Nesiadis, Andreas Dimitriadis, Georgios Moschos† (Head coach: Nikos Milas)

†Moschos died of cancer in 1966, but he was inducted into the AEK Hall of Fame in 2008, and added to the 1968 championship team as an honorary member.

- 1968–69 (Czechoslovakia) Slavia VŠ Praha

Jiří Zídek Sr., Jiří Růžička, Robert Mifka, Jiri Ammer, Bohumil Tomášek, Karel Baroch, Jaroslav Krivy, Jiří Konopásek (Head coach: Jaroslav Šíp)

- 1969–70 (Italy) Fides Napoli

Miles Aiken, Jim Williams, Sauro Bufalini, Carlos d'Aquila, Remo Maggetti, Giovanni Gavagnin, Francesco Ovi, Antonio Errico, Vincenzo Errico, Manfredo Fucile, Renato Abbate, Leonardo Coen (Head coach: Antonio Zorzi)

- 1970–71 (Italy) Simmenthal Milano

Art Kenney, Massimo Masini, Renzo Bariviera, Giulio Iellini, Giorgio Giomo, Giuseppe Brumatti, Paolo Bianchi, Giorgio Papetti, Mauro Cerioni, Roberto Paleari, Giorgio Gaggiotti (Head coach: Cesare Rubini)

- 1971–72 (Italy) Simmenthal Milano

Art Kenney, Massimo Masini, Renzo Bariviera, Giulio Iellini, Giuseppe Brumatti, Mauro Cerioni, Paolo Bianchi, Giorgio Giomo, Doriano Iacuzzo, Sergio Borlenghi, Claudio Ferrari (Head coach: Cesare Rubini)

- 1972–73 (Soviet Union) Spartak Leningrad

Alexander Belov, Yuri Pavlov, Alexander Bolshakov, Yuri Shtukin, Andrei Makeev, Vladimir Yakovlev, Sergei Kuznetsov, Leonid Ivanov, Valeri Fjodorov, Ivan Dvorny, Evgeni Volkov, Ivan Rozhin (Head coach: Vladimir Kondrashin)

- 1973–74 (Socialist Federal Republic of Yugoslavia) Crvena zvezda

Zoran Slavnić, Ljubodrag Simonović, Dragan Kapičić, Dragiša Vučinić, Radivoje Živković, Ivan Sarjanović, Zoran Lazarević, Dragoje Jovašević, Goran Rakočević, Ljupče Žugić (Head coach: Aleksandar Nikolić)

- 1974–75 (Soviet Union) Spartak Leningrad

Alexander Belov, Yuri Pavlov, Alexander Bolshakov, Vladimir Arzamaskov, Yuri Shtukin, Andrei Makeev, Vladimir Yakovlev, Sergei Kuznetsov, Mikhail Silantev, Leonid Ivanov, Valeri Fjodorov (Head coach: Vladimir Kondrashin)

- 1975–76 (Italy) Cinzano Milano

Mike Sylvester, Austin "Red" Robbins, Giuseppe Brumatti, Paolo Bianchi, Antonio Francescatto, Sergio Borlenghi, Vittorio Ferracini, Franco Boselli, Maurizio Borghese, Maurizio Benatti, Dino Boselli, Paolo Friz (Head coach: Filippo Faina)

- 1976–77 (Italy) Birra Forst Cantù

Bob Lienhard, Hart Wingo, Pierlo Marzorati, Carlo Recalcati, Fabrizio Della Fiori, Renzo Tombolato, Franco Meneghel, Giorgio Cattini, Roberto Natalini, Umberto Cappelletti, Non Prezzati, Bruno Carapacchi, Giampiero Cortinovis (Head coach: Arnaldo Taurisano)

- 1977–78 (Italy) Gabetti Cantù

Bob Lienhard, Hart Wingo, Pierlo Marzorati, Carlo Recalcati, Fabrizio Della Fiori, Fausto Bargna, Renzo Tombolato, Franco Meneghel, Giuseppe Gergati, Denis Innocentin, Umberto Cappelletti, Davide Bertazzini, Fabio Brambilla (Head coach: Arnaldo Taurisano)

- 1978–79 (Italy) Gabetti Cantù

Johnny Neumann, Dave Batton, Pierlo Marzorati, Carlo Recalcati, Fabrizio Della Fiori, Renzo Bariviera, Renzo Tombolato, Denis Innocentin, Umberto Cappelletti, Antonello Riva, Non Porro, Giorgio Panzini (Head coach: Arnaldo Taurisano)

- 1979–80 (Italy) Emerson Varese

Bob Morse, Dino Meneghin, Bruce Seals, Aldo Ossola, Alberto Mottini, Maurizio Gualco, Enzo Carraria, Fabio Colombo, Mauro Salvaneschi, Antonio Campiglio, Riccardo Caneva, Marco Bergonzoni (Head coach: Edoardo Rusconi)

- 1980–81 (Italy) Squibb Cantù

Pierlo Marzorati, Antonello Riva, Bruce Flowers, Tom Boswell, Renzo Bariviera, Renzo Tombolato, Denis Innocentin, Giorgio Cattini, Terry Stotts, Umberto Cappelletti, Eugenio Masolo, Antonio Sala, Valerio Fumagalli, Giuseppe Bosa (Head coach: Valerio Bianchini)

- 1981–82 (Socialist Federal Republic of Yugoslavia) Cibona

Krešimir Ćosić, Aleksandar Petrović, Andro Knego, Zoran Čutura, Mihovil Nakić, Sven Ušić, Damir Pavličević, Adnan Bečić, Rajko Gospodnetić, Mlađan Cetinja, Toni Bevanda, Srđan Savović (Head coach: Mirko Novosel)

- 1982–83 (Italy) Scavolini Pesaro

Dragan Kićanović, Željko Jerkov, Walter Magnifico, Mike Sylvester, Domenico Zampolini, Giuseppe Ponzoni, Amos Benevelli, Alessandro Boni, Massimo Bini, Gianluca Del Monte, Fabio Mancini, Antonio Sassanelli (Head coach: Petar Skansi)

- 1983–84 (Spain) Real Madrid

Juan Antonio Corbalán, Brian Jackson, Fernando Martín, Wayne Robinson, Rafael Rullán, Fernando Romay, Juan Manuel López Iturriaga, Antonio Martín, Francisco José Velasco, Juan Antonio Orenga, Wilson Simon (Head coach: Lolo Sainz)

- 1984–85 (Spain) FC Barcelona

Juan Antonio San Epifanio, Chicho Sibilio, Ignacio Solozábal, Mike Davis, Otis Howard, Juan Domingo De la Cruz, Xavi Crespo, Pedro Ansa, Arturo Seara, Julián Ortiz, Ángel Heredero (Head coach: Antoni Serra / Manuel Flores)

- 1985–86 (Spain) FC Barcelona

Juan Antonio San Epifanio, Chicho Sibilio, Ignacio Solozábal, Greg Wiltjer, Mark Smith, Juan Domingo De la Cruz, Xavi Crespo, Arturo Seara, Julián Ortiz, Steve Trumbo, Ferran Martínez, Ángel Heredero, Jordi Soler (Head coach: Aíto García Reneses)

- 1986–87 (Socialist Federal Republic of Yugoslavia) Cibona

Dražen Petrović, Aleksandar Petrović, Danko Cvjetićanin, Andro Knego, Zoran Čutura, Mihovil Nakić, Franjo Arapović, Sven Ušić, Branko Vukićević, Adnan Bečić, Nebojša Razić (Head coach: Janez Drvarič / Mirko Novosel)

- 1987–88 (France) Limoges CSP

Richard Dacoury, Clarence Kea, Stéphane Ostrowski, Greg Beugnot, Don Collins, Jacques Monclar, Hugues Occansey, Georges Vestris, Alain Forestier, Frederic Guinot, Jean-Luc Hribersek, Laurent Vinsou, Franck Maquaire (Head coach: Michel Gomez)

- 1988–89 (Spain) Real Madrid

Dražen Petrović, Johnny Rogers, Fernando Martín, José Biriukov, Antonio Martín, Pep Cargol, Fernando Romay, José Luis Llorente, Enrique Villalobos, Javier Pérez, Miguel Ángel Cabral, Carlos García (Head coach: Lolo Sainz)

- 1989–90 (Italy) Knorr Bologna

Micheal Ray Richardson, Roberto Brunamonti, Mike Sylvester, Clemon Johnson, Gus Binelli, Lauro Bon, Claudio Coldebella, Vittorio Gallinari, Massimiliano Romboli, Clivo Massimo Righi, Tommaso Tasso, Davide Bonora, Andrea Cempini (Head coach: Ettore Messina)

- 1990–91 (Greece) PAOK

Bane Prelević, Ken Barlow, John Korfas, Panagiotis Fasoulas, Nikos Boudouris, Nikos Stavropoulos, Georgios Makaras, Panagiotis Papachronis, Memos Ioannou, Achilleas Mamatziolas, Lazaros Tsakiris, Georgios Valavanidis (Head coach: Dragan Šakota)

=== FIBA European Cup ===
- 1991–92 (Spain) Real Madrid Asegurator

Rickey Brown, Mark Simpson, José Biriukov, Antonio Martín, Fernando Romay, José Miguel Antúnez, Pep Cargol, José Luis Llorente, Enrique Villalobos, Jonatan Ángel Ojeda, José María Silva, Tomás González (Head coach: Clifford Luyk)

- 1992–93 (Greece) Sato Aris

Roy Tarpley, Panagiotis Giannakis, J. J. Anderson, Michail Misunov, Dinos Angelidis, Vangelis Vourtzoumis, Georgios Gasparis, Vassilis Lipiridis, Memos Ioannou, Igor Moraitov, Theodosios Paralikas (Head coach: Zvi Sherf)

- 1993–94 (Slovenia) Smelt Olimpija

Dušan Hauptman, Roman Horvat, Boris Gorenc, Žarko Đurišić, Marko Tušek, Nebojša Razić, Marijan Kraljević, Jaka Daneu, Vitali Nosov, Klemen Zaletel (Head coach: Zmago Sagadin)

- 1994–95 (Italy) Benetton Treviso

Petar Naumoski, Orlando Woolridge, Ken Barlow, Stefano Rusconi, Riccardo Pittis, Massimo Iacopini, Andrea Gracis, Denis Marconato, Alberto Vianini, Riccardo Esposito, Maurizio Ragazzi, Federico Peruzzo, Paolo Casonato (Head coach: Mike D'Antoni)

- 1995–96 (Spain) Taugrés

Velimir Perasović, Kenny Green, Ramón Rivas, Marcelo Nicola, Jordi Millera, Miguel Ángel Reyes, Ferran Lopez, Jorge Garbajosa, Juan Pedro Cazorla, Carlos Cazorla, Carlos Dicenta, Pedro Rodríguez, Juan Ignacio Gómez (Head coach: Manel Comas)

=== FIBA EuroCup ===
- 1996–97 (Spain) Real Madrid Teka

Dejan Bodiroga, Joe Arlauckas, Alberto Herreros, Mike Smith, Juan Antonio Morales, Juan Antonio Orenga, Alberto Angulo, José Miguel Antúnez, Ismael Santos, Roberto Núñez, Pablo Laso, Lorenzo Sanz (Head coach: Željko Obradović)

- 1997–98 (Lithuania) Žalgiris

Saulius Štombergas, Ennis Whatley, Franjo Arapović, Dainius Adomaitis, Tomas Masiulis, Virginijus Praškevičius, Darius Maskoliūnas, Kęstutis Šeštokas, Mindaugas Žukauskas, Eurelijus Žukauskas, Darius Sirtautas, Tauras Stumbrys, Danya Abrams (Head coach: Jonas Kazlauskas)

=== FIBA Saporta Cup ===
- 1998–99 (Italy) Benetton Treviso

Henry Williams, Željko Rebrača, Marcelo Nicola, Glenn Sekunda, William Di Spalatro, Tomás Jofresa, Denis Marconato, Casey Schmidt, Davide Bonora, Riccardo Pittis, Oliver Narr, Stjepan Stazić, Matteo Maestrello (Head coach: Željko Obradović)

- 1999–00 (Greece) AEK

Anthony Bowie, Martin Müürsepp, Michalis Kakiouzis, Angelos Koronios, Nikos Chatzis, Dimos Dikoudis, Iakovos "Jake" Tsakalidis, Dan O'Sullivan, Steve Hansell, Vassilis Kikilias, Nikos Papanikolopoulos, Miltos Moschou (Head coach: Dušan Ivković)

- 2000–01 (Greece) Maroussi

Ashraf Amaya, Jimmy Oliver, Vasco Evtimov, Georgios Maslarinos, Alexis Falekas, Sotirios Nikolaidis, Vangelis Vourtzoumis, Dimitris Marmarinos, Dimitris Karaplis, Vangelis Logothetis, Sotiris Manolopoulos, Charalampos Charalampidis, Kostas Anagnostou (Head coach: Vangelis Alexandris)

- 2001–02 (Italy) Montepaschi Siena

Petar Naumoski, Vrbica Stefanov, Brian Tolbert, Boris Gorenc, Milenko Topić, Roberto Chiacig, Mindaugas Žukauskas, Nikola Bulatović, Alpay Öztaş, Marco Rossetti, Germán Scarone, Andrea Pilotti (Head coach: Ergin Ataman)

== See also ==
- FIBA Korać Cup
- FIBA EuroCup Challenge
- FIBA EuroChallenge
- European Basketball Club Super Cup
- Rosters of the top basketball teams in European club competitions

== Sources ==
- FIBA Saporta Cup
