= Ratomir Vićentić =

Serbian basketball player and professor (1939–2009)

Personal information
- Born: 5 August 1939 Ivanjica, Kingdom of Yugoslavia
- Died: 14 July 2009 (aged 69) Belgrade, Serbia
- Listed height: 2.20 m (7 ft 3 in)

Career information
- NBA draft: 1961: undrafted
- Playing career: 1958–1965
- Position: Center

Career history
- 1958–1965: Crvena zvezda
Medals
Men's basketball
Representing Yugoslavia
Mediterranean Games
| Bronze medal – third place | 1963 Naples | Team |

Ratomir Vićentić (Serbian Cyrillic: Ратомир Вићентић; August 5, 1939 – July 14, 2009) was a Serbian professor and professional basketball player.

== Basketball career ==
Vićentić spent entire career playing for Crvena zvezda of the Yugoslav Federal League. He played from 1958 to 1965. Also, he played for the Crvena zvezda youth system.

Vićentić was a member of the Yugoslavia national basketball team that won the bronze medal at the 1963 Mediterranean Games in Naples, Italy.

=== Post-playing career ===
After retirement in 1965, Vićentić was a technical director for the Crvena zvezda until 1972.

== Personal life ==
Vićentić moved to Belgrade in 1950 where he graduated at the University of Belgrade with major in mechanical engineering. He was a professor and the head of the Belgrade Polytechnic School.

== See also ==
- List of KK Crvena zvezda players with 100 games played
