= Dragiša Vučinić =

Serbian basketball player and coach

Personal information
- Born: 4 April 1948 (age 78) Mostar, PR Bosnia-Herzegovina, FPR Yugoslavia
- Listed height: 2.01 m (6 ft 7 in)
- Listed weight: 98 kg (216 lb)

Career information
- NBA draft: 1970: undrafted
- Playing career: 1965–1979
- Position: Center
- Number: 12
- Coaching career: 1978–1979

Career history

Playing
- 1965–1967: Lokomotiva Mostar
- 1967–1979: Crvena zvezda

Coaching
- 1978–1979: Crvena zvezda (assistant)
- 1979: Crvena zvezda

Career highlights
- As player: European Cup Winners' Cup champion (1974); 2× Yugoslav League champion (1969, 1972); 3× Yugoslav Cup winner (1971, 1973, 1975)
Medals
Men's basketball
Representing Yugoslavia
EuroBasket
Silver medal – second place	1971 West Germany	Team
European Championship for Juniors
Silver medal – second place	1966 Italy	Team
Silver medal – second place	1968 Spain	Team

Dragiša Vučinić (Serbian Cyrillic: Драгиша Вучинић; born 4 April 1948) is a Serbian former professional basketball player and coach who spent major part of his career with Crvena zvezda.

== Playing career ==
Vučinić grew up playing basketball for his hometown team KK Lokomotiva Mostar. In 1967, he left the club joining Belgrade-based team Crvena zvezda.

=== Crvena zvezda (1967–1979) ===
On 2 May 1967, Vučinić made his debut with Crvena zvezda, in a game with Split. He spent, almost, entire playing career with the club, playing in the end of 1960s and during 1970s. He is ranked 2nd all-time Crvena zvezda leader in seasons played (13, along with Vladimir Cvetković), 4th in games played (349) and 5th in points scored (4,612). From 1967 till 1975, Vučinić played 200 consecutive games, and he remains as one of two players in Yugoslav Basketball League history who played more than 200 consecutive games.

== National team career ==
Vučinić was a member of the Yugoslavia national team that won a silver medal at the 1971 European Championship in West Germany. Also, he won two silver medals for Yugoslavia Under-18 national team at European Championship for Juniors (1966 in Italy and 1968 in Spain).

== Post-playing career ==
=== Coaching career ===
In his final season as a player, 1978–79, Vučinić took role of an assistant coach for Crvena zvezda under head coach Bratislav Đorđević. Briefly, he was briefly the head coach, leading the team in 7 games, as a player-coach.

=== Basketball executive career ===
Vučinić was the president of the Crvena zvezda from 1991 to 1994, when he collaborated with his former teammate Dragan Kapičić who was a director. Also, he has held the offices of President of Basketball Federation of Serbia.

== Career achievements ==
As player

- FIBA European Cup Winners' Cup winner: 1 (with Crvena zvezda: 1973–74)
- Yugoslav League champion: 2 (with Crvena zvezda: 1968–69, 1971–72)
- Yugoslav Cup winner: 3 (with Crvena zvezda: 1970–71, 1972–73, 1974–75)

== See also ==
- List of Red Star Belgrade basketball coaches
- List of KK Crvena zvezda players with 100 games played
- KK Crvena zvezda accomplishments and records
