= Ljubodrag Simonović =

Serbian basketball player (born 1949)

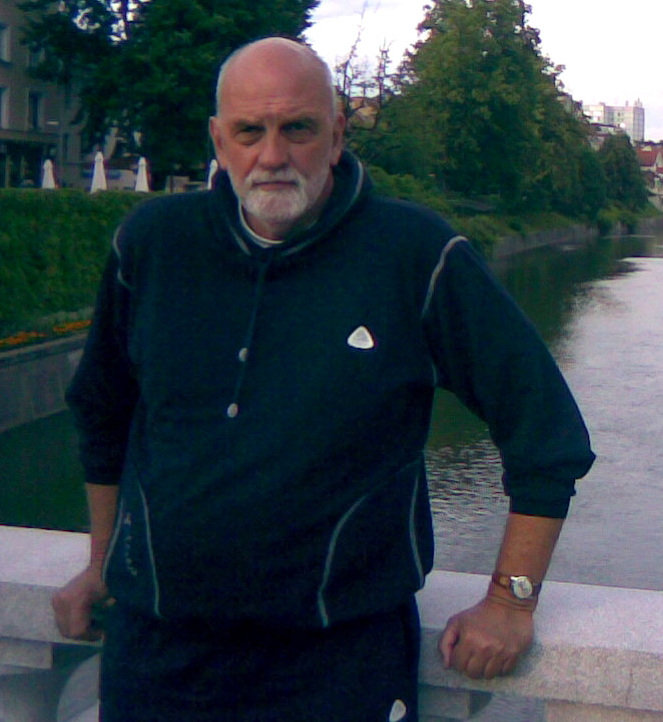
- Simonović in Ljubljana in 2011
- Born: Ljubodrag Simonović; 1 January 1949 (age 77); Vrnjačka Banja, PR Serbia, FPR Yugoslavia
- Other name: Duci

Education
- Education: XI Belgrade Gymnasium
- Alma mater: University of Belgrade (LL.B., LL.M., DPhil.)

Philosophical work
- Era: Contemporary philosophy
- School: Marxist humanism Freudo-Marxism
- Main interests: Critical theory, anti-capitalism, anti-globalization
- Notable ideas: Criticism of sport and Olympism, Coca-Cola culture, Life-creating humanism
- Basketball career

Personal information
- Listed height: 1.96 m (6 ft 5 in)
- Listed weight: 85 kg (187 lb)

Career information
- NBA draft: 1971: undrafted
- Playing career: 1965–1982
- Position: Shooting guard
- Number: 11

Career history
- 1965–1967: Sloga Kraljevo
- 1967–1976: Crvena zvezda
- 1976–1978: 1. FC 01 Bamberg
- 1978–1982: Lifam Stara Pazova

Career highlights
- 3× FIBA European Selection (1970–1972); FIBA Saporta Cup champion (1974); 2× Yugoslav League champion (1969, 1972); 3× Yugoslav Cup winner (1971, 1973, 1975); German League Top Scorer (1977)
Medals
Men's basketball
Representing Yugoslavia
FIBA World Cup
Gold medal – first place	1970 Yugoslavia
EuroBasket
Silver medal – second place	1969 Italy
Silver medal – second place	1971 West Germany
Mediterranean Games
Gold medal – first place	1967 Tunis
European Championship for Juniors
Silver medal – second place	1966 Italy	Under-20
Silver medal – second place	1968 Spain	Under-20
- Website: http://ljubodragsimonovic.com

Ljubodrag "Duci" Simonović (Serbian Cyrillic: Љубодраг Дуци Симоновић, pronounced [ʎǔbodrag dǔtsi simǒːnoʋitɕ]); born 1 January 1949) is a Serbian philosopher, author and retired basketball player.

He played with Red Star Belgrade, with which he won two National Championships, three National Cups and one FIBA European Cup Winners' Cup. From 1976 to 1978, he played for 1. FC 01 Bamberg in the top-tier level German Basketball Bundesliga. Simonović played for the senior Yugoslav national basketball team that won the gold medal at the 1970 FIBA World Championship. He was also a three time FIBA European Selection.

After earning a Master of Laws from the University of Belgrade Faculty of Law and a Doctorate in philosophy from the University of Belgrade Faculty of Philosophy, Simonović went on to become an accomplished author.

== Early life ==
Born in Vrnjačka Banja to parents Jevrem Simonović and Ilonka (née Dobai), both of whom worked as hairdressers, young Ljubodrag grew up in Kraljevo with an older brother Vladimir. Their father Jevrem, a Montenegrin Serb born 1911 in Kolašin whose mother died while giving birth to him and whose father died right after World War I, made a living as a tradesman (in addition to hairdressing he also worked as a seamster and tailor) and over time developed a staunchly communist worldview. Simonović's mother Ilonka, born in 1921, came from a mixed background, born to German mother Ana Schumetz and Hungarian father János Dobay (the surname was later spelled as Dobai), a left-leaning officer who participated in the ultimately unsuccessful 1919 Hungarian Revolution before fleeing over the border into the recently established Kingdom of Serbs, Croats and Slovenes to escape the White Terror of Miklós Horthy. János initially settled in Subotica and eventually in Kraljevo where he worked as a machinist. Duci's mother Ilonka later converted to Orthodox Christianity and took the name Jelena.

As a kid, Simonović took up chess, which he was taught at age five by his father, an avid player himself. Simonović played the game frequently, later citing it as the first arena in which his competitive nature had been displayed. He also loved playing football.

He got the nickname Duci after the Hungarian word böci.

== Club basketball career ==
Simonović started out with KK Sloga from Kraljevo.

=== Red Star Belgrade ===
Simonović moved to Belgrade in 1967 at the age of eighteen in order to play for KK Crvena zvezda as the latest addition to a talented squad led by twenty-six-year-old Vladimir Cvetković with a slew of up-and-coming youngsters such as nineteen-year-old small forward Dragan Kapičić and eighteen-year-old mercurial point guard Zoran Slavnić. Having graduated from the XI Belgrade Gymnasium and simultaneous to his duties at the club, Simonović enrolled at the University of Belgrade's Faculty of Law, attending lectures and studying for exams. As a freshman at the University, Duci took part in the 1968 student demonstrations.

==== 1968–69 season ====
Coached by Milan Bjegojević, Zvezda, somewhat improbably, won the 1968–69 Yugoslav League title in Duci's third season at the club.

==== 1969–70 season ====
Winning the Yugoslav league title meant an automatic qualification to the European Champions Cup for the following 1969–70 season. Starting off well against lesser opposition in the early rounds, Zvezda eventually got into a difficult quarterfinals group, losing all three of its home-and-away ties against Alexander Gomelsky's defending European champion CSKA Moscow, Aca Nikolić's Varese, and even the seeming minnows of the group ASVEL.

On the domestic front, the club surrendered its title, finishing second to Olimpija as Simonović recorded another stellar season that recommended him for national head coach Ranko Žeravica's Yugoslav national squad at the 1970 FIBA World Championship.

==== 1970–71 season ====
Coming off the greatest success of his career, being part of the squad that won the 1970 World Championship, Simonović continued developing his game as Zvezda went through a head coaching change with Đorđe Andrijašević being brought in as replacement to the longtime head coach Bjegojević. Andrijašević wouldn't end up sticking around for long, victim of Zvezda's another indifferent season in the Yugoslav League despite winning the Yugoslav Cup.

In 1971, Simonović graduated from the University of Belgrade's Faculty of Law.

==== 1971–72 season ====
Bata Đorđević became the new head coach, he introduced new players Goran Rakočević and Dragiša Vučinić as Zvezda began piling up wins, both in the Yugoslav League and in European Cup Winners' Cup. Simonović, who turned 23 years of age midway through the season, became the team's number one option on offense. While playing away at Hala sportova against the eternal crosstown rivals KK Partizan he scored 59 points. The three-point shot hadn't been implemented yet.

The season ended dramatically, as Zvezda lost the Cup Winners' Cup final in Thessaloniki 70–74 versus Olimpia Milano in late March 1972 before finishing the domestic league with the identical 17–5 record as KK Split (Jugoplastika), which meant playing a single-game playoff decider for the title. Zvezda won 75–50 thus claiming its second title in three years.

==== 1972–73 season ====
By the summer of 1972, the Slavnić-Simonović-Kapičić trio had finally seemingly matured and big things were expected in the upcoming season.

Despite Simonović having an incident-filled summer with the national team at the 1972 Olympics, he was initially able to put it behind him and contribute greatly to Zvezda's European Cup run. However, all was not well inside the Zvezda locker room as a simmering rift between local Belgrade-born-and-raised players who came up through the club's youth system (Slavnić and Kapičić) and those brought in from the outside (Simonović and Vučinić) had been gaining in intensity.

Cliques were being formed within the squad and things eventually boiled over on 10 January 1973 in Tel Aviv during the away contest versus Maccabi, the first game of the quarterfinals group stage. Zvezda had been leading throughout the game with Duci pouring in baskets from all positions, however, he was not satisfied with the frequency and the quality of passes he is being fed by point guard Slavnić. Slavnić in turn did not like Simonović's attitude so he decided to stop distributing the ball to him entirely. It was not long before Simonović threw a fit, cursing out coach Đorđević right on the floor for not reacting to what is going on, as everything fell apart – despite Simonović scoring 38 points, Zvezda still ended up losing 113–102. Upon returning to Belgrade, Simonović got fined YUD300,000 by Zvezda for "excessive individualism" and "inappropriate behaviour". Deeply dissatisfied over what had transpired and extremely stung by the fine, right after playing a Yugoslav League game versus KK Željezničar Karlovac, Simonović announced a decision to stop playing basketball, saying he would like to devote his time and efforts to science, having already been pursuing a master's degree in law after earning an undergraduate law degree two years earlier. Considering Simonović had just turned 24 years of age, the Yugoslav media went into overdrive, speculating on the real reasons for what it considered to be a shocking decision.

== National team career ==
Simonović debuted for the senior Yugoslav national basketball team at age 17, going on to make 109 appearances with them in total, and scoring a total of 1,018 points. His playing career ended, while he was a player-coach in Stara Pazova, due to a burst capillary in his throat.

At the EuroBasket, he played in 23 games, at the FIBA World Cup he played in 6 games, and he also had 4 appearances in the Summer Olympic Games, and 15 at the Balkan Championship. All together, he won 6 gold medals and 2 silver medals. For Red Star Belgrade, he wore number 11 while for the national team, he wore number 5.

=== 1972 Summer Olympics ===
The Yugoslav national team arrived to Munich, for the 1972 Summer Olympics, as the reigning world champions from Ljubljana 1970, and still hoping to win one of the medals, though the team was quite changed. The team's victory over Italy, 85–78, at the beginning of the tournament improved their expectations, but in the second round, the Yugoslav team was defeated by Puerto Rico, by a score of 79–74.

It was later proven that two players from the Puerto Rican side had used illegal doping substances, prompting a protest from the Yugoslav players. Simonović however (aged 23), was ejected from the team, upon continuing to protest after the Yugoslav players had been silenced. Yugoslavia eventually finished 5th in the tournament.

== Writing ==
After his retirement from sport he has written various books, including: "Rebellion of Robots", "Professionalism or Socialism", "Olympic Deception of the 'divine baron' – Pierre de Coubertin." His books center around a critique of Olympism and professional sports.

He authored a piece about the mystery behind the 1987 death of German heptathlete Birgit Dressel who died at the age of 26. Simonović has written critiques of school where he has referred to it as an "oppressive institution" that "always corresponds with the ruling order."

=== Published books ===
- Pobuna robota (Rebellion of Robots), 1981
- Sport–Kapitalizam–Destrukcija (Sport-Capitalism-Destruction), 1995
- Filozofski aspekti modernog olimpizma (Philosophical Aspects of Modern Olympism), 2001
- Olimpijska podvala (Olympic Deception), 2007
- Novi svet je moguć (A New World is Possible), 2007
- Ustaj radniče! (Rise Up, Worker!), 2011
- Poslednja revolucija (The Last Revolution), 2013
- Hajdegerova filozofija u svetlu životvornog humanizma (Heidegger's Philosophy in the Light of Life-Creating Humanism), 2019

== Personal life ==
Simonović is married and has three children. In the 2015 Serbian sports drama We Will Be the World Champions, Simonović is portrayed by Jovan Belobrković.

== See also ==
- KK Crvena zvezda accomplishments and records
- Yugoslav First Federal Basketball League career stats leaders
