= Dragan Kapičić =

Serbian basketball player and executive (1948–2024)

- Kapičić with Crvena zvezda in 1971

Personal information
- Born: 7 August 1948 Belgrade, PR Serbia, FPR Yugoslavia
- Died: 24 June 2024 (aged 75) Belgrade, Serbia
- Listed height: 1.98 m (6 ft 6 in)
- Listed weight: 95 kg (209 lb)

Career information
- NBA draft: 1970: undrafted
- Playing career: 1965–1981
- Position: Small forward
- Number: 9, 10

Career history
- 1965–1977: Crvena zvezda
- 1977–1981: Saturn Köln

Career highlights
- FIBA Saporta Cup champion (1974); 2× Yugoslav League champion (1969, 1972); German League champion: (1981); 3× Yugoslav Cup winner (1971, 1973, 1975); FIBA European Selection (1970); FIBA Saporta Cup Finals Top Scorer (1974)
Medals
Men's basketball
Representing Yugoslavia
FIBA World Cup
| Gold medal – first place | 1970 Yugoslavia |
| Silver medal – second place | 1974 Puerto Rico |
EuroBasket
| Silver medal – second place | 1969 Italy |
| Silver medal – second place | 1971 West Germany |
| Gold medal – first place | 1975 Yugoslavia |
European Under-18 Championship
| Silver medal – second place | 1966 Italy | Under-18 |

Dragan Kapičić (Serbian Cyrillic: Драган Капичић; 7 August 1948 – 24 June 2024) was a Serbian professional basketball player and executive.

== Club career ==
Kapičić played with Crvena zvezda, in his hometown of Belgrade, in the Yugoslav First Federal League, from 1965 to 1977. His teammates were Zoran Slavnić, Ljubodrag Simonović, Dragiša Vučinić, and Vladimir Cvetković among others. With them, he won two Yugoslav National League championships, three Yugoslav National Cup titles, and one European-wide secondary level FIBA European Cup Winners' Cup (later called FIBA Saporta Cup) championship. He is Crvena zvezda's all-time club leader in total points scored.

In the late stage of his club career, he played with Saturn Köln of the German League.

== National team career ==
Kapičić played in 169 games with the senior Yugoslavian national team. He represented Yugoslavia at the 1972 Munich Summer Olympics. With Yugoslavia, he won gold medals at the 1970 FIBA World Championship, and the 1975 EuroBasket.

== Post-playing career ==
Kapičić was the President of the Basketball Federation of Serbia, from April 2007 to April 2011.

== Personal life ==
Kapičić is the son of Jovo Kapičić (1919‒2013), who was a Yugoslav People's Army General and recipient of the Order of the People's Hero. He married Slobodanka "Beba" Žugić, a Montenegrin actress. The couple had two sons.

His son Stefan (b. 1978), is an actor who is best known for playing his role of Colossus in Deadpool (2016) and Deadpool 2 (2018). In the 2015 Serbian sports drama We Will Be the World Champions, Kapičić is portrayed by his son Stefan.

Kapičić died in Belgrade on 24 June 2024, at the age of 75.

== Career achievements ==
- FIBA European Cup Winners' Cup (FIBA Saporta Cup) champion: 1 (with Crvena zvezda: 1973–74)
- Yugoslav League champion: 2 (with Crvena zvezda: 1968–69, 1971–72)
- German League champion: 1 (with Saturn Köln: 1980–81)
- Yugoslav Cup winner: 3 (with Crvena zvezda: 1970–71, 1972–73, 1974–75)

== See also ==
- KK Crvena zvezda accomplishments and records
- List of KK Crvena zvezda players with 100 games played
- Yugoslav First Federal Basketball League career stats leaders

Sporting positions
| Preceded by Goran Knežević as President of BFSM | President of the Basketball Federation of Serbia; 2007–2011 | Succeeded by Dragan Đilas |
