= 1973–74 FIBA European Cup Winners' Cup =

- League: FIBA European Cup Winners' Cup
- Sport: Basketball

Finals
- Champions: (Socialist Federal Republic of Yugoslavia) Crvena zvezda
- Runners-up: (Czechoslovakia) Spartak ZJŠ Brno

FIBA European Cup Winners' Cup seasons
- ← 1972–73 1974–75 →

The 1973–74 FIBA European Cup Winners' Cup was the eighth edition of FIBA's 2nd-tier level European-wide professional club basketball competition, contested between national domestic cup champions, running from October 1973, to 4 April 1974. It was contested by 25 teams, one less than in the previous edition.

Crvena zvezda defeated Spartak ZJŠ Brno in the final, held in Udine, to become the first Yugoslav League team to win the competition, after unsuccessful appearances by Crvena zvezda itself, and Jugoplastika, in the two previous finals. On the other hand, it was the last of three Czechoslovak League appearances in the final.

== Participants ==
Country	Teams	Clubs
Albania	1	17 Nëntori Tirana
Austria	1	Mounier Wels
Belgium	1	Royal IV
Bulgaria	1	CSKA Septemvriisko zname
Czechoslovakia	1	Spartak ZJŠ Brno
Denmark	1	Falcon
England	1	Embassy All Stars
Finland	1	Helsingin Kisa-Toverit
France	1	Alsace Bagnolet
Greece	1	Olympiacos
Hungary	1	Soproni MAFC
Israel	1	Beitar Jerusalem
Italy	1	Saclà Asti
Luxembourg	1	Spartak Mamer
Morocco	1	Wydad Casablanca
Poland	1	Śląsk Wrocław
Portugal	1	Benfica
Romania	1	Steaua București
Scotland	1	Paisley
Spain	1	Estudiantes Monteverde
Sweden	1	Helsingborg
Switzerland	1	Pregassona
Turkey	1	TED Ankara Kolejliler
West Germany	1	Gießen 46ers
(Socialist Federal Republic of Yugoslavia) Yugoslavia	1	Crvena zvezda

== Preliminary round ==
Team 1	Agg.	Team 2	1st leg	2nd leg
Gießen 46ers (West Germany)	201–96	(Denmark) Falcon	112–51	89–45

== First round ==
Team 1	Agg.	Team 2	1st leg	2nd leg
Śląsk Wrocław (Poland)	172–176	(France) Alsace Bagnolet	91–84	81–92
17 Nëntori Tirana (Albania)	163–213	(Socialist Federal Republic of Yugoslavia) Crvena zvezda	93–99	70–114
Soproni MAFC (Hungary)	123–137	(Greece) Olympiacos	67–67	56–70
Gießen 46ers (West Germany)	156–167	(Bulgaria) CSKA Septemvriisko zname	75–74	81–93
TED Ankara Kolejliler (Turkey)	2–0*	(Israel) Beitar Jerusalem	2-0	
Saclà Asti (Italy)	206–124	(Switzerland) Pregassona	115-47	91-77
Mounier Wels (Austria)	201–143	(Morocco) Wydad Casablanca	116-66	85-77
Benfica (Portugal)	152–168	(Spain) Estudiantes Monteverde	91-75	61-93
Royal IV (Belgium)	194–163	(Sweden) Helsingborg	106-82	88-81
Embassy All Stars (England)	160–226	(Czechoslovakia) Spartak ZJŠ Brno	84-103	76-123
Paisley (Scotland)	144–169	(Luxembourg) Spartak Mamer	51-64	93-105
Helsingin Kisa-Toverit (Finland)	141–180	(Romania) Steaua București	78-75	63-105

*Originally, the Champion of the Israeli Cup was drawn to play against the Turkish Champion, but FIBA cancelled this match and awarded TED Ankara Kolejliler a victory by forfeit (2-0).

== Second round ==
Team 1	Agg.	Team 2	1st leg	2nd leg
Alsace Bagnolet (France)	180–194	(Socialist Federal Republic of Yugoslavia) Crvena zvezda	94–92	86–102
Olympiacos (Greece)	136–138	(Bulgaria) CSKA Septemvriisko zname	67–59	69–79
TED Ankara Kolejliler (Turkey)	94–168	(Italy) Saclà Asti	43-79	51-89
Mounier Wels (Austria)	154–181	(Spain) Estudiantes Monteverde	89-92	65-89
Royal IV (Belgium)	177–210	(Czechoslovakia) Spartak ZJŠ Brno	94-96	83-114
Spartak Mamer (Luxembourg)	154–225	(Romania) Steaua București	77-108	77-117

== Quarterfinals ==
The quarterfinals were played with a round-robin system, in which every Two Game series (TGS) constituted as one game for the record.

Key to colors
Top two places in each group advance to semifinals

=== Group A ===
	Team	Pld	Pts	W	L	PF	PA	PD
1.	(Socialist Federal Republic of Yugoslavia) Crvena zvezda	2	4	2	0	342	333	+9
2.	(Italy) Saclà Asti	2	3	1	1	331	315	+16
3.	(Bulgaria) CSKA Septemvriisko zname	2	2	0	2	294	319	-25

=== Group B ===
	Team	Pld	Pts	W	L	PF	PA	PD
1.	(Czechoslovakia) Spartak ZJŠ Brno	2	3	1	1	349	330	+19
2.	(Spain) Estudiantes Monteverde	2	3	1	1	313	323	-10
3.	(Romania) Steaua București	2	3	1	1	297	306	-9

== Semifinals ==
Team 1	Agg.	Team 2	1st leg	2nd leg
Estudiantes Monteverde (Spain)	159–183	(Socialist Federal Republic of Yugoslavia) Crvena zvezda	74–79	85–104
Saclà Asti (Italy)	157–158	(Czechoslovakia) Spartak ZJŠ Brno	86–70	71–88

== Final ==
April 2, Palasport "Primo Carnera", Udine

Team 1	Score	Team 2
Crvena zvezda (Socialist Federal Republic of Yugoslavia)	86–75	(Czechoslovakia) Spartak ZJŠ Brno

1973–74 FIBA European Cup Winners' Cup Champions

Crvena zvezda
1st title
