= Vladimir Cvetković =

Serbian basketball player (1941–2026)

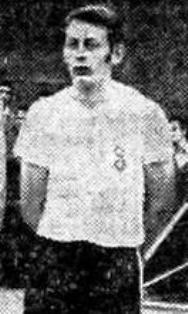
- Cvetković with Yugoslavia at the 1968 Olympics

Personal information
- Born: 24 May 1941 Loznica, German-occupied Serbia
- Died: 6 May 2026 (aged 84) Belgrade, Serbia
- Listed height: 1.96 m (6 ft 5 in)
- Listed weight: 90 kg (198 lb)

Career information
- NBA draft: 1963: undrafted
- Playing career: 1959–1972
- Position: Forward
- Number: 8

Career history
- 1959–1972: Crvena zvezda

Career highlights
- 2× Yugoslav League champion (1969, 1972); Yugoslav Cup winner (1971)
Medals
Men's basketball
Representing Yugoslavia
Summer Olympics
| Silver medal – second place | 1968 Mexico City | Team |
FIBA World Championship
| Silver medal – second place | 1963 Brazil | Team |
| Silver medal – second place | 1967 Uruguay | Team |
Eurobasket
| Silver medal – second place | 1969 Italy | Team |

Vladimir "Cvele" Cvetković (Serbian Cyrillic: Владимир Цветковић; 24 May 1941 – 6 May 2026) was a Serbian basketball player and sports administrator who was the honorary president of Crvena zvezda. He spent his entire playing career with Crvena zvezda, winning two National Championships and one National Cup in 13 seasons at the club.

== Cvetković's historical free-throws ==
The Yugoslav national team won their first Olympic medal in Mexico in 1968. The Yugoslavs played well and placed themselves into the semifinals where they played versus the Soviet Union. In a clash between basketball David and Goliath, in front of 22.000 supporters who gave their sympathies to David, i.e. Yugoslav team, the key man of the match was player of KK Crvena zvezda, Vladimir Cvetković.

Seven seconds before the end of the match, at the result 61–60 for Yugoslavia, Cvetković scored two free throws for 63–61. In between the free throws, he kissed his wedding band for good luck. The Soviets had enough time to reduce to 63–62, but not enough time to avoid defeat. The celebration of the host for the victory of the Yugoslav team quickly hauled from the hall to the streets of Ciudad Mexico and lasted till daybreak.

The team of the USA was a too strong rival in the finals and the Yugoslav team was defeated with 50–65 scoring the second place in the basketball tournament.

== Death ==
Cvetković died in Belgrade, Serbia on 6 May 2026, at the age of 84.

== See also ==
- List of father-and-son combinations who have played for Crvena zvezda
- List of KK Crvena zvezda players with 100 games played
- Yugoslav First Federal Basketball League career stats leaders
- KK Crvena zvezda accomplishments and records
- List of Yugoslav First Federal Basketball League annual scoring leaders

== Sources ==
- Veliki Vladimir at mojacrvenazvezda.net

Government offices
| Preceded by Dragan Kićanović | Minister of Youth and Sports of Serbia; 1992–1998 | Succeeded by Zoran Anđelković |
Sporting positions
| Preceded by Ivo Andrić | Honorary President of KK Crvena zvezda 2021–present | Incumbent |
| Preceded by N/A | Secretary General of Red Star Belgrade; 1983–2001 | Succeeded by N/A |
