= Zoran Slavnić =

Serbian basketball player & coach (born 1949)

Personal information
- Born: 26 October 1949 (age 77) Belgrade, PR Serbia, FPR Yugoslavia
- Listed height: 1.77 m (5 ft 10 in)
- Listed weight: 73 kg (161 lb)

Career information
- NBA draft: 1971: undrafted
- Playing career: 1967–1983
- Position: Point guard
- Number: 10, 15
- Coaching career: 1980, 1983–2007

Career history

Playing
- 1967–1977: Crvena zvezda
- 1977–1979: Joventut Badalona
- 1979–1981: Šibenka
- 1981–1982: Partizan
- 1982–1983: Indesit Caserta

Coaching
- 1980, 1983–1984: Šibenka
- 1984–1985: Partizan
- 1985–1986: Jugoplastika
- 1986–1988: Caja de Ronda Málaga
- 1988–1991: Crvena zvezda
- 1991–1992: Dafni
- 1993–1994: Beobanka
- 1994–1995: Crvena zvezda
- 1995–1996: Joventut Badalona
- 1996–1997: Iraklis Thessaloniki
- 2001: TSK uniVersa Bamberg
- 2004: Atlas
- 2007: Serbia

Career highlights
- As player: FIBA Saporta Cup champion (1974); FIBA Saporta Cup Finals Top Scorer (1975); FIBA European Selection (1976); Spanish League champion (1978); 2× Yugoslavian League champion (1969, 1972); 3× Yugoslavian Cup winner (1971, 1973, 1975); FIBA's 50 Greatest Players (1991)
- FIBA Hall of Fame
Medals
Men's basketball
Representing Yugoslavia
Summer Olympics
Silver medal – second place	1976 Montreal
Gold medal – first place	1980 Moscow
FIBA World Cup
Silver medal – second place	1974 Puerto rico
Gold medal – first place	1978 Philippines
EuroBasket
Gold medal – first place	1973 Spain
Gold medal – first place	1975 Yugoslavia
Gold medal – first place	1977 Belgium
Bronze medal – third place	1979 Italy
European U-18 Championship
Silver medal – second place	1968 Spain	Under-18

Zoran "Moka" Slavnić (Serbian Cyrillic: Зоран Мока Славнић; born 26 October 1949) is a Serbian retired professional basketball player and coach. He played with Crvena zvezda and with Partizan. One of the best European point guards of all time, he was named one of FIBA's 50 Greatest Players in 1991 and became a FIBA Hall of Fame player in 2013.

With Crvena zvezda, he won two Yugoslav National Championships, three Yugoslav National Cups, and one FIBA European Cup Winner's Cup. He also won the Spanish League championship with Joventut Badalona. During his basketball career, he played for Crvena zvezda (1967–1977), Joventut Badalona (1977–1979), Šibenka (1979–1981), and Partizan (1981–1982). His head coaches were Ranko Žeravica, Zdravko Kubat, and Mirko Novosel.

Slavnić was one of the rare players who won everything he could in a career with his national team: 3 EuroBaskets (1973, 1975, 1977), the FIBA World Cup (1978), and Summer Olympics gold (1980).

== Professional playing career ==
=== Club career ===
Slavnic's biggest successes were achieved in a Red Star Belgrade jersey, as during the 1967–1977 period, he won two Yugoslavia League championships, three Yugoslavian Cups, and the FIBA European Cup Winner's Cup (later renamed FIBA Saporta Cup). Together with Dragan Kapičić, Duci Simonović, and Vladimir Cvetković, he was a member of one of greatest team in Red Star's history. While playing for Joventut, he helped the Spanish side to win the country's Spanish League championship in 1978, for the second time in the club's history. After that, he came back to Yugoslav basketball, playing for Sibenka, and after that, he played with Caserta in the Italian 2nd Division. He finished his playing career in that club, but after a short period in Red Star's biggest rivals, Partizan Belgrade. Together with legendary Yugoslav head coach, professor Aca Nikolić, he's the only person who both played and coached, Red Star and Partizan.

=== National team career ===
Slavnić played in 179 games with the senior Yugoslavian national team, and scored 1,465 points. He's one of the rare players with gold medals from the Summer Olympic Games, the FIBA World Cup, and the FIBA EuroBasket. He won three EuroBasket titles, 1973 in Barcelona, 1975 in Belgrade, and 1977 in Liege. He won the gold at the FIBA World Cup, in Manila in 1978, and Olympic gold, in Moscow in 1980.

== Coaching career ==
=== Clubs ===
Slavnić coached Šibenka, Partizan Belgrade, Jugoplastika, Malaga, Red Star Belgrade, Dafni, Joventut Badalona, Iraklis, Brose Baskets Bamberg, and Atlas.

=== Serbian national team ===
Unanimously, the executive board of the Serbian Basketball Federation, decided on 29 May 2007, that Slavnić should be the head coach of the first senior national team of Serbia; after the state union with Montenegro had ceased to exist. After numerous "thanks, but no thanks" decisions of experienced players, who didn't want to participate at EuroBasket 2007, Slavnić selected Milan Gurović, Marko Jarić, Darko Miličić, and nine debutantes, who later became standard members of the senior Serbian national team. But, due to defeats to Russia, who went on to take the title, then Greece, who were the defending European champions, and won in overtime, and Israel, Serbia were eliminated in the first phase of the continental championship. The Serbian Basketball Federation decided on 26 September 2007, to look for a new head coach.

== Miscellaneous ==
Together with his dribbling, Zoran Slavnić had three moves that were highlights of his career:

- 1975 - He scored over his own head against Spain, at the 1975 EuroBasket, in Belgrade,
- 1976 - He scored one second before the end of regulation against Italy, and won the game that sent Yugoslavia to the semifinals of the 1976 Summer Olympic Games, in Montreal.
- 1977 - He passed the ball like volleyball players do, to Dragan Kićanović, while playing against the Soviet Union, in the finals of the 1977 EuroBasket, in Liege.
- The Spaniards called him, "The Eccentric Genius", due to his original style of play. His personal motto during his playing days was, "This is all just a game."
- 1991 - FIBA announced that Slavnić was among the 50 Greatest Players in FIBA History.
- 2007 - Serbian authorities announced that Slavnić was among those who would receive "national sports recognition for his contribution to the development and affirmation of sport."
- 2013 - FIBA made Slavnić a FIBA Hall of Fame player. Although he was inducted as a player, his career as a head coach was also considered, having trained numerous young players that later went on to become stars, such as Dražen Petrović, Saša Đorđević, Saša Obradović, Toni Kukoč, and Dino Rađa.

== Personal life ==
In June 2022, Slavnić had a hip surgery.

== See also ==
- KK Crvena zvezda accomplishments and records
- List of Red Star Belgrade basketball coaches
- List of KK Crvena zvezda players with 100 games played
- Yugoslav First Federal Basketball League career stats leaders
