= 1990–91 KK Crvena zvezda season =

Crvena zvezda
1990–91 season
- President: (Socialist Federal Republic of Yugoslavia) Slobodan Radulović
- Head coach: (Socialist Federal Republic of Yugoslavia) Zoran Slavnić
- Arena: Pionir Hall
- Yugoslav League: 9th
- Yugoslav Cup: Round of 32
- Cup Winners' Cup: Quarterfinals
- All statistics correct as of July 30, 2019.

The 1990–91 Crvena zvezda season is the 46th season in the existence of the club. The team played in the Yugoslav Federal A League and the FIBA European Cup Winners' Cup.

== Players ==
=== Squad information ===
Crvena zvezda roster
Players
Coaches

Pos.	No.	Nat.	Name	Ht.
PG	12	(Socialist Federal Republic of Yugoslavia)	Bukumirović, Nebojša	1.91 m (6 ft 3 in)
F/C	10	(Socialist Federal Republic of Yugoslavia)	Cvetković, Rastko	2.08 m (6 ft 10 in)
PG	4	(Socialist Federal Republic of Yugoslavia)	Dabić, Srđan	1.84 m (6 ft 0 in)
SF	15	(Socialist Federal Republic of Yugoslavia)	Dalipagić, Dražen	1.97 m (6 ft 6 in)
SG	5	(Socialist Federal Republic of Yugoslavia)	Ilić, Nebojša	1.98 m (6 ft 6 in)
C		(Socialist Federal Republic of Yugoslavia)	Joksimović, Mirko	2.07 m (6 ft 9 in)
C	9	(Socialist Federal Republic of Yugoslavia)	Jovanović, Zoran	2.12 m (6 ft 11 in)
SG	6	(Socialist Federal Republic of Yugoslavia)	Nikolić, Slobodan	1.93 m (6 ft 4 in)
G	11	(Socialist Federal Republic of Yugoslavia)	Obradović, Saša	1.97 m (6 ft 6 in)
		(Socialist Federal Republic of Yugoslavia)	Ognjenović, Miomir
C	8	(Socialist Federal Republic of Yugoslavia)	Petrović, Nemanja	2.08 m (6 ft 10 in)
		(Socialist Federal Republic of Yugoslavia)	Simić,
C	13	(Socialist Federal Republic of Yugoslavia)	Šilobad, Mlađan	2.08 m (6 ft 10 in)
C	14	(Socialist Federal Republic of Yugoslavia)	Tarlać, Dragan	2.09 m (6 ft 10 in)
F		(Socialist Federal Republic of Yugoslavia)	Vasić, Saša	2.01 m (6 ft 7 in)

Head coach

- (Socialist Federal Republic of Yugoslavia) Zoran Slavnić

Assistant coach(es)

- (Socialist Federal Republic of Yugoslavia) Marin Sedlaček
- (Socialist Federal Republic of Yugoslavia) Dejan Srzić

Legend

- (C) Team captain
- Injured

=== Transactions ===
==== Players In ====
No.	Pos.	Nat.	Name	Moving from	
15	SF	(Socialist Federal Republic of Yugoslavia)	Dražen Dalipagić	22. decembar	(Socialist Federal Republic of Yugoslavia)
12	PG	(Socialist Federal Republic of Yugoslavia)	Nebojša Bukumirović	Cibona	(Socialist Federal Republic of Yugoslavia)
14	C	(Socialist Federal Republic of Yugoslavia)	Dragan Tarlać	Vojvodina	(Socialist Federal Republic of Yugoslavia)

==== Players Out ====
No.	Pos.	Nat.	Name	Moving to	
–	PF	(Socialist Federal Republic of Yugoslavia)	Slobodan Kaličanin	IMT	(Socialist Federal Republic of Yugoslavia)
8	SF	(Socialist Federal Republic of Yugoslavia)	Boban Janković	Vojvodina	(Socialist Federal Republic of Yugoslavia)
14	F	(Socialist Federal Republic of Yugoslavia)	Mirko Pavlović	Southern Illinois	(United States)
15	F	(Socialist Federal Republic of Yugoslavia)	Časlav Trifunović	Gonzaga	(United States)
11	PG	(Socialist Federal Republic of Yugoslavia)	Zoran Radović	Alba Berlin	(Germany)
7	F/C	(Socialist Federal Republic of Yugoslavia)	Aleksandar Gilić		(Greece)
12	F/C	(Socialist Federal Republic of Yugoslavia)	Ivo Petović	AEK Athens	(Greece)
7	F	(Socialist Federal Republic of Yugoslavia)	Dušan Stević	Oklahoma City	(United States)

=== Compulsory military service ===
No.	Pos.	Nat.	Name
	G	(Socialist Federal Republic of Yugoslavia)	Dragan Aleksić

== Competitions ==
=== Overall ===
Competition	Started round	Final position / round	First match	Last match
Yugoslav Federal League	Matchday 1	9th	October 1990	April 30, 1991
FIBA European Cup Winners' Cup	First round	First round	October 23, 1990	January 29, 1991
Yugoslav Cup	Round of 64	Round of 32	1990	1990

Source: Competitions

=== Overview ===
Competition	Record							
Competition	Pld	W	D	L	PF	PA	PD	Win %
Yugoslav Federal League	22	8	0	14	1,942	2,047	−105	36.36
Yugoslav League Play-out	6	5	0	1	578	537	+41	83.33
FIBA European Cup Winners' Cup	8	3	0	5	764	799	−35	37.50
Yugoslav Cup	2	1	0	1	238	205	+33	50.00
Total	38	17	0	21	3,522	3,588	−66	44.74

Last updated: August 2, 2019
Source: Competitions

=== Yugoslav Federal League ===
==== Regular season ====
Pos	Teams	Pts	Pld	W	L	PF	PA	Qualification or relegation
7	Smelt Olimpija	22	10	12	1944	1986	32	
8	Bosna	22	8	14	1882	1990	30	
9	Crvena zvezda	22	8	14	1943	2047	30	Qualification to the play-out
10	Budućnost	22	7	15	1771	1943	29	Qualification to the play-out
11	Šibenka	22	7	15	1821	1907	29	Relegation to Federal B League

Source: Yugoslav First Basketball League Archive

Win Loss

==== Play-out ====
Standings

Pos	Team	Pld	W	L	PF	PA	PD	Pts	
1	Crvena zvezda	6	5	1	578	537	+41	11	Advanced to YUBA League
2	Sloboda Dita	6	4	2	511	476	+35	10	Advanced to YUBA League
3	Budućnost	6	2	4	513	515	−2	8	
4	Radnički Beograd	6	1	5	537	611	−74	7	

Source: KOŠ Magazin

Win Loss

Matches

13 April 1991 Play-out 1	Crvena zvezda	85–80	Sloboda Dita	Belgrade
	Scoring by half: 40–46, 45–34
	Pts: Dalipagić 31	Boxscore	Pts: Mitrović, Videka 18	Arena: Pionir Hall; Attendance: 200; Referees: Danko Radić, Aleš Kamnikar

16 April 1991 Play-out 2	Radnički Beograd	100–109	Crvena zvezda	Belgrade
	Pts: Stojković 25	Boxscore	Pts: Nikolić 29	Arena: SC Šumice; Attendance: 100; Referees: Brnako Jovanović, Dragoslav Ljuca

20 April 1991 Play-out 3	Crvena zvezda	96–78	Budućnost	Belgrade
	Scoring by half: 48–44, 48–34
	Pts: Ilić 27	Boxscore	Pts: Pajović 20	Arena: Pionir Hall; Attendance: 350; Referees: Zdravko Kurulić, Voja Vuković

23 April 1991 Play-out 4	Sloboda Dita	93–80	Crvena zvezda	Tuzla
	Scoring by half: 48–41, 45–39
	Pts: Mitrović 16	Boxscore	Pts: Nikolić 25	Arena: Mejdan Hall; Attendance: 5,500; Referees: Tomislav Jovančić, Stjepan Krajnović

27 April 1991 Play-out 5	Crvena zvezda	116–95	Radnički Beograd	Belgrade
	Scoring by half: 59–47, 57–48
	Pts: Nikolić 25	Boxscore	Pts: Tomić 21	Arena: Pionir Hall; Attendance: 200; Referees: Nenad Tošović, Zoran Dimitrijević

30 April 1991 Play-out 6	Budućnost	91–92	Crvena zvezda	Cetinje
	Scoring by half: 48–40, 43–52
	Pts: Peković 25	Boxscore	Pts: Ilić 26	Arena: Lovćen SC; Attendance: 500; Referees: Zdravko Kurulić, Stjepan Krajnović

=== FIBA European Cup Winners' Cup ===
Win Loss

==== Top 16 ====
23 October 1990 1	Paşabahçe (Turkey)	94–85	(Socialist Federal Republic of Yugoslavia) Crvena zvezda	Istanbul
	Scoring by half: 48–43, 46–42
	Pts: Embry 29		Pts: Ilić 28

30 October 1990 2	Crvena zvezda (Socialist Federal Republic of Yugoslavia)	86–76(OT)	(Turkey) Paşabahçe	Belgrade
	Scoring by half: 36–35, 38–30, Overtime: 12–11
				Arena: Pionir Hall

==== Quarterfinals ====
Standings

Pos	Teams	Pts	Pld	W	L	PF	PA	PD	Qualification or relegation
1.	(Spain) CAI Zaragoza	6	10	4	2	593	571	+22	Advance to semifinals
2.	(Greece) PAOK	6	9	3	3	528	500	+28	Advance to semifinals
3.	(Israel) Hapoel Galil Elyon	6	9	3	3	546	560	-14	
4.	(Socialist Federal Republic of Yugoslavia) Crvena zvezda	6	8	2	4	593	629	-36	

Matches

11 December 1990 1	Hapoel Galil Elyon (Israel)	115–92	(Socialist Federal Republic of Yugoslavia) Crvena zvezda	Kfar Blum
	Scoring by half: 61–46, 54–46
	Pts: Barmore 27		Pts: Ilić 25	Attendance: 1,500

18 December 1990 2	PAOK (Greece)	91–80	(Socialist Federal Republic of Yugoslavia) Crvena zvezda	Thessaloniki
	Scoring by half: 43–33, 48–47
	Pts: Prelević 27		Pts: Dalipagić 23	Arena: Alexandreio Melathron Hall; Attendance: 5,000

8 January 1991 3	Crvena zvezda (Socialist Federal Republic of Yugoslavia)	109–113	(Spain) CAI Zaragoza	Belgrade
	Scoring by half: 50–56, 59–57
	Pts: Nikolić 31		Pts: Magee 36	Arena: Pionir Hall; Attendance: 800

15 January 1991 4	Crvena zvezda (Socialist Federal Republic of Yugoslavia)	108–101	(Israel) Hapoel Galil Elyon	Belgrade
	Scoring by half: 53–55, 55–46
	Pts: Nikolić 26		Pts: Leaf 29	Arena: Pionir Hall; Attendance: 400

22 January 1991 5	Crvena zvezda (Socialist Federal Republic of Yugoslavia)	91–75	(Greece) PAOK	Belgrade
	Scoring by half: 49–40, 42–35
	Pts: Nikolić 30		Pts: Prelević 20	Arena: Pionir Hall; Attendance: 2,500

29 January 1991 6	CAI Zaragoza (Spain)	134–113	(Socialist Federal Republic of Yugoslavia) Crvena zvezda	Zaragoza
	Scoring by half: 72–47, 62–66
	Pts: Magee 41		Pts: Nikolić 25	Arena: Pabellón Príncipe Felipe; Attendance: 8,000

=== Yugoslav Cup ===
Win Loss

Round of 64	Napredak Aleksinac	116–150	Crvena zvezda

Round of 32	Radnički Beograd	89–88	Crvena zvezda

== Statistics ==
Legend
GP	Games played	GS	Games started	MPG	Minutes per game
FG%	Field-goal percentage	3FG%	3-point field-goal percentage	FT%	Free-throw percentage
RPG	Rebounds per game	APG	Assists per game	SPG	Steals per game
BPG	Blocks per game	PPG	Points per game	PIR	PIR per game

Player	Left during the season
