= 1989–90 KK Crvena zvezda season =

Crvena zvezda
1989–90 season
- Head coach: (Socialist Federal Republic of Yugoslavia) Zoran Slavnić
- Arena: Pionir Hall
- Yugoslav League: 2nd
- Playoffs: Runners-up
- Yugoslav Cup: Runners-up
- FIBA Korać Cup: First round
- Biggest win: 110–84 IMT (4 November 1989)
- Biggest defeat: Jugoplastika 123–75 (24 February 1990)
- All statistics correct as of July 30, 2019.

The 1989–90 Crvena zvezda season is the 45th season in the existence of the club. The team played in the Yugoslav Federal A League and the FIBA Korać Cup.

== Overview ==
Guards Nebojša Ilić and Saša Obradović, and forward Slobodan Kaličanin were ruled out for the season due to the compulsory military service in the Yugoslav People's Army. Youth players Dragan Aleksić, Mirko Pavlović, Dušan Stević, Mlađan Šilobad, and Časlav Trifunović were promoted from the junior selection.

== Players ==
=== Squad information ===
Crvena zvezda roster
Players
Coaches

| Pos. | No. | Nat. | Name | Ht. |
|---|---|---|---|---|
| SG | 5 | (Socialist Federal Republic of Yugoslavia) | Aleksić, Dragan | 1.95 m (6 ft 5 in) |
| F/C | 10 | (Socialist Federal Republic of Yugoslavia) | Cvetković, Rastko | 2.08 m (6 ft 10 in) |
| PG | 4 | (Socialist Federal Republic of Yugoslavia) | Dabić, Srđan | 1.84 m (6 ft 0 in) |
| F/C | 7 | (Socialist Federal Republic of Yugoslavia) | Gilić, Aleksandar | 2.07 m (6 ft 9 in) |
| SF | 8 | (Socialist Federal Republic of Yugoslavia) | Janković, Boban | 2.00 m (6 ft 7 in) |
| C | 9 | (Socialist Federal Republic of Yugoslavia) | Jovanović, Zoran | 2.12 m (6 ft 11 in) |
| SG | 6 | (Socialist Federal Republic of Yugoslavia) | Nikolić, Slobodan | 1.93 m (6 ft 4 in) |
| | | (Socialist Federal Republic of Yugoslavia) | Ognjenović, Miomir |
| F | 14 | (Socialist Federal Republic of Yugoslavia) | Pavlović, Mirko | 2.00 m (6 ft 7 in) |
| F/C | 12 | (Socialist Federal Republic of Yugoslavia) | Petović, Ivo | 2.05 m (6 ft 9 in) |
| C | | (Socialist Federal Republic of Yugoslavia) | Petrović, Nemanja | 2.08 m (6 ft 10 in) |
| PG | 11 | (Socialist Federal Republic of Yugoslavia) | Radović, Zoran | 1.91 m (6 ft 3 in) |
| F | 7 | (Socialist Federal Republic of Yugoslavia) | Stević, Dušan | 2.06 m (6 ft 9 in) |
| C | 13 | (Socialist Federal Republic of Yugoslavia) | Šilobad, Mlađan | 2.08 m (6 ft 10 in) |
| F | 15 | (Socialist Federal Republic of Yugoslavia) | Trifunović, Časlav | 2.04 m (6 ft 8 in) |
| F | 14 | (Socialist Federal Republic of Yugoslavia) | Vasić, Saša | 2.01 m (6 ft 7 in) |

Head coach

- (Socialist Federal Republic of Yugoslavia) Zoran Slavnić

Assistant coach(es)

- (Socialist Federal Republic of Yugoslavia) Marin Sedlaček

Legend

- (C) Team captain
- Injured

=== Transactions ===
==== Players In ====
| No. | Pos. | Nat. | Name | Moving from | |
|---|---|---|---|---|---|
| | | (Socialist Federal Republic of Yugoslavia) | Miomir Ognjenović | Sloga | (Socialist Federal Republic of Yugoslavia) |
| 6 | SG | (Socialist Federal Republic of Yugoslavia) | Slobodan Nikolić | Vojvodina | (Socialist Federal Republic of Yugoslavia) |
| 14 | F | (Socialist Federal Republic of Yugoslavia) | Saša Vasić | Pirot | (Socialist Federal Republic of Yugoslavia) |

==== Players Out ====
| No. | Pos. | Nat. | Name | Moving to | |
|---|---|---|---|---|---|
| 9 | F | (Socialist Federal Republic of Yugoslavia) | Stevan Karadžić | Gradine Pula | (Socialist Federal Republic of Yugoslavia) |
| 15 | PF | (Socialist Federal Republic of Yugoslavia) | Zufer Avdija | Gradine Pula | (Socialist Federal Republic of Yugoslavia) |
| 10 | C | (Socialist Federal Republic of Yugoslavia) | Predrag Bogosavljev | Vevey | (Switzerland) |

=== Compulsory military service ===
| No. | Pos. | Nat. | Name |
|---|---|---|---|
| 5 | SG | (Socialist Federal Republic of Yugoslavia) | Nebojša Ilić |
| | PF | (Socialist Federal Republic of Yugoslavia) | Slobodan Kaličanin |
| 11 | G | (Socialist Federal Republic of Yugoslavia) | Saša Obradović |

== Competitions ==
=== Overall ===
| Competition | Started round | Final position / round | First match | Last match |
|---|---|---|---|---|
| Yugoslav Federal League | Matchday 1 | Runners-up | October 7, 1989 | April 29, 1990 |
| FIBA Korać Cup | First round | First round | September 27, 1989 | October 4, 1989 |
| Yugoslav Cup | Round of 32 | Runners-up | 1990 | February 18, 1990 |

Source: Competitions

=== Overview ===
| Competition | Record | | | | | | | |
| Competition | Pld | W | D | L | PF | PA | PD | Win % |
|---|---|---|---|---|---|---|---|---|
| Yugoslav Federal League | 22 | 17 | 0 | 5 | 2,026 | 1,961 | +65 | 77.27 |
| Yugoslav Playoffs | 7 | 3 | 0 | 4 | 573 | 656 | −83 | 42.86 |
| FIBA Korać Cup | 2 | 1 | 0 | 1 | 158 | 161 | −3 | 50.00 |
| Yugoslav Cup | 5 | 4 | 0 | 1 | 390 | 364 | +26 | 80.00 |
| Total | 36 | 25 | 0 | 11 | 3,147 | 3,142 | +5 | 69.44 |

Last updated: August 2, 2019
Source: Competitions

=== Yugoslav Federal League ===
==== Regular season ====
| Pos | Teams | Pts | Pld | W | L | PF | PA | Qualification or relegation |
|---|---|---|---|---|---|---|---|---|
| 1 | Jugoplastika | 22 | 19 | 3 | 2118 | 1734 | 41 | Advance to the playoffs |
| 2 | Crvena zvezda | 22 | 17 | 5 | 2026 | 1961 | 39 | Advance to the playoffs |
| 3 | Zadar | 22 | 13 | 9 | 1999 | 1873 | 35 | Advance to the playoffs |
| 4 | Cibona | 22 | 13 | 9 | 2114 | 1968 | 35 | Advance to the playoffs |
| 5 | Vojvodina | 22 | 12 | 10 | 1851 | 1851 | 34 | |

Source: Yugoslav First Basketball League Archive

Win Loss

==== Matches ====
| 7 October 1989 1 | Crvena zvezda | 75–68 | Zorka | Belgrade |
| | | | | Arena: Pionir Hall |

| 14 October 1989 2 | Partizan | 77–87 | Crvena zvezda | Belgrade |
| | | | | Arena: Pionir Hall |

| 21 October 1989 3 | Crvena zvezda | 93–83 | Vojvodina | Belgrade |
| | | | | Arena: Pionir Hall |

| 28 October 1989 4 | Cibona | 96–80 | Crvena zvezda | Zagreb |

| 4 November 1989 5 | Crvena zvezda | 110–84 | IMT | Belgrade |
| | | | | Arena: Pionir Hall |

| 7 November 1989 6 | Sloboda Dita | 89–106 | Crvena zvezda | Tuzla |

| 11 November 1989 7 | Crvena zvezda | 84–101 | Jugoplastika | Belgrade |
| | | | | Arena: Pionir Hall |

| 2 December 1989 8 | Crvena zvezda | 97–75 | Bosna | Belgrade |
| | | | | Arena: Pionir Hall |

| 9 December 1989 9 | Zadar | 85–88 | Crvena zvezda | Zadar |
| | | | | Arena: Jazine Hall |

| 19 December 1989 10 | Crvena zvezda | 87–84 | Novi Zagreb | Belgrade |
| | | | | Arena: Pionir Hall |

| 23 December 1989 11 | Smelt Olimpija | 113–93 | Crvena zvezda | Ljubljana |

| 6 January 1990 12 | Zorka | 88–109 | Crvena zvezda | Šabac |

| 13 January 1990 13 | Crvena zvezda | 81–79 | Partizan | Belgrade |
| | | | | Arena: Pionir Hall |

| 20 January 1990 14 | Vojvodina | 79–84 | Crvena zvezda | Novi Sad |

| 27 January 1990 15 | Crvena zvezda | 95–92 | Cibona | Belgrade |
| | | | | Arena: Pionir Hall |

| 3 February 1990 16 | IMT | 101–91 | Crvena zvezda | Belgrade |

| 10 February 1990 17 | Crvena zvezda | 107–93 | Sloboda Dita | Belgrade |
| | | | | Arena: Pionir Hall |

| 24 February 1990 18 | Jugoplastika | 123–75 | Crvena zvezda | Split |
| | | | | Arena: Arena Gripe |

| 3 March 1990 19 | Bosna | 93–98 | Crvena zvezda | Sarajevo |

| 10 March 1990 20 | Crvena zvezda | 91–88 | Zadar | Belgrade |
| | | | | Arena: Pionir Hall |

| 17 March 1990 21 | Novi Zagreb | 67–70 | Crvena zvezda | Zagreb |

| 24 March 1990 22 | Crvena zvezda | 115–103 | Smelt Olimpija | Belgrade |
| | | | | Arena: Pionir Hall |

==== Playoffs ====
| 3 April 1990 Semifinals 1 | Crvena zvezda | 93–89 (Series: 1–0) | Zadar | Belgrade |
| | | | | Arena: Pionir Hall |

| 7 April 1990 Semifinals 2 | Zadar | 108–90 (Series: 1–1) | Crvena zvezda | Zadar |
| | | | | Arena: Jazine Hall |

| 10 April 1990 Semifinals 3 | Crvena zvezda | 97–88 (Series: 2–1) | Zadar | Belgrade |
| | | | | Arena: Pionir Hall |

| 22 April 1990 Finals 1 | Jugoplastika | 98–70 (Series: 1–0) | Crvena zvezda | Split |
| | Scoring by half: 58–29, 40–41 |
| | Pts: Rađa 19 | Boxscore | Pts: Janković 19 | Arena: Arena Gripe; Attendance: 8,500; Referees: Zoran Grbac, Tomislav Jovančić |

| 25 April 1990 Finals 2 | Crvena zvezda | 69–67 (Series: 1–1) | Jugoplastika | Belgrade |
| | Scoring by half: 45–42, 24–25 |
| | Pts: Radović 16 | Boxscore | Pts: Rađa 26 | Arena: Pionir Hall; Attendance: 5,000; Referees: Danko Radić, Tihomir Bubalo |

| 26 April 1990 Finals 3 | Crvena zvezda | 63–93 (Series: 1–2) | Jugoplastika | Belgrade |
| | Scoring by half: 28–32, 35–61 |
| | Pts: Radović, Janković 12 | Boxscore | Pts: Ivanović 29 | Arena: Pionir Hall; Attendance: 6,000; Referees: Zoran Grbac, Iztok Rems |

| 29 April 1990 Finals 4 | Jugoplastika | 113–91 (Series: 3–1) | Crvena zvezda | Split |
| | Scoring by half: 50–44, 63–47 |
| | Pts: Ivanović 32 | Boxscore | Pts: Jovanović 23 | Arena: Arena Gripe; Attendance: 7,000; Referees: Zdravko Kurilić, Danko Radić |

=== Korać Cup ===
Win Loss

| 27 September 1989 First round G1 | Iraklis (Greece) | 99–81 | (Socialist Federal Republic of Yugoslavia) Crvena zvezda | Thessaloniki |
| | Scoring by half: 51–39, 48–42 |
| | Pts: Ancrum 49 | Boxscore | Pts: Dabić 22 | Arena: Ivanofeio Sports Arena |

| 4 October 1989 First round G2 | Crvena zvezda (Socialist Federal Republic of Yugoslavia) | 77–62 | (Greece) Iraklis | Belgrade |
| | Scoring by half: 34–29, 43–33 |
| | Pts: Nikolıć 19 | Boxscore | Pts: Kakiousis 14 | Arena: Pionir Hall |

=== Yugoslav Cup ===
Win Loss

| Round of 32 | Kolubara | 63–69 | Crvena zvezda |

| September 1989 Round of 16 | Crvena zvezda | 84–76 | Čelik Zenica | Belgrade |

| September 1989 Quarterfinals | Crvena zvezda | 84–73 | IMT | Belgrade |

| 16 February 1990 Semifinals | Crvena zvezda | 76–73 | Cibona | Dubrovnik |
| | | | | Arena: Gospino polje Hall |

| 18 February 1990 Final | Jugoplastika | 79–77 | Crvena zvezda | Dubrovnik |
| | Scoring by half: 48–49, 31–28 |
| | Pts: Rađa 22 | | Pts: Jovanović, Radović 19 | Arena: Gospino polje Hall; Attendance: 3,000; Referees: Zoran Grbac, Tomislav Jovančić |

== Statistics ==
Legend
| GP | Games played | GS | Games started | MPG | Minutes per game |
| FG% | Field-goal percentage | 3FG% | 3-point field-goal percentage | FT% | Free-throw percentage |
| RPG | Rebounds per game | APG | Assists per game | SPG | Steals per game |
| BPG | Blocks per game | PPG | Points per game | PIR | PIR per game |

| Player | Left during the season |

=== Yugoslav League (Regular Season) ===
| Player | GP | GS | MPG | 2FG% | 3FG% | FT% | RPG | APG | SPG | BPG | PPG |
|---|---|---|---|---|---|---|---|---|---|---|---|
| Dragan Aleksić | 3 | – | 4.0 | .000 | .000 | .000 | 0.3 | 0.0 | 0.0 | 0.0 | 0.0 |
| Rastko Cvetković | 20 | – | 17.9 | .480 | 1.00 | .563 | 3.8 | 0.0 | 0.3 | 0.3 | 4.7 |
| Srđan Dabić | 22 | – | 26.9 | .484 | .500 | .738 | 0.8 | 2.0 | 1.7 | 0.0 | 9.5 |
| Aleksandar Gilić | Did not play | | | | | | | | | | |
| Boban Janković | 22 | – | 32.7 | .533 | .414 | .717 | 5.7 | 1.7 | 1.2 | 0.1 | 23.8 |
| Zoran Jovanović | 22 | – | 29.2 | .590 | .000 | .630 | 7.5 | 0.3 | 0.3 | 1.7 | 11.9 |
| Slobodan Nikolić | 22 | – | 26.0 | .532 | .500 | .842 | 0.6 | 0.7 | 0.7 | 0.0 | 15.6 |
| Miomir Ognjenović | 3 | – | 2.7 | .000 | .000 | .667 | 0.3 | 0.7 | 0.7 | 0.0 | 0.5 |
| Mirko Pavlović | 17 | – | 6.6 | .167 | .000 | .500 | 0.6 | 0.2 | 0.0 | 0.0 | 2.1 |
| Ivo Petović | 20 | – | 9.7 | .333 | .394 | .765 | 0.0 | 0.0 | 0.2 | 0.1 | 3.4 |
| Nemanja Petrović | Did not play | | | | | | | | | | |
| Zoran Radović | 20 | – | 32.7 | .409 | .321 | .809 | 3.5 | 2.5 | 2.0 | 0.0 | 14.5 |
| Dušan Stević | 4 | – | 9.3 | .500 | .250 | .250 | 1.5 | 0.0 | 0.0 | 0.0 | 1.5 |
| Mlađan Šilobad | 20 | – | 22.9 | .627 | .357 | .722 | 3.6 | 0.2 | 0.5 | 0.4 | 8.0 |
| Časlav Trifunović | 10 | – | 5.2 | .412 | .000 | .500 | 0.0 | 0.0 | 2.2 | 0.0 | 1.6 |
| Saša Vasić | 7 | – | 1.9 | .250 | .000 | .000 | 0.0 | 0.0 | 0.0 | 0.0 | 1.5 |

Source: KOŠ magazin No. 7

=== Yugoslav League (Playoffs) ===
| Player | GP | GS | MPG | 2FG% | 3FG% | FT% | RPG | APG | SPG | BPG | PPG |
|---|---|---|---|---|---|---|---|---|---|---|---|
| Dragan Aleksić | Did not play | | | | | | | | | | |
| Rastko Cvetković | 6 | – | – | – | – | – | – | – | – | – | 6.8 |
| Srđan Dabić | 5 | – | – | – | – | – | – | – | – | – | 4.8 |
| Aleksandar Gilić | Did not play | | | | | | | | | | |
| Boban Janković | 7 | – | – | – | – | – | – | – | – | – | 17.4 |
| Zoran Jovanović | 7 | – | – | – | – | – | – | – | – | – | 13.1 |
| Slobodan Nikolić | 7 | – | – | – | – | – | – | – | – | – | 15.0 |
| Miomir Ognjenović | 2 | – | – | – | – | – | – | – | – | – | 1.0 |
| Mirko Pavlović | 6 | – | – | – | – | – | – | – | – | – | 4.3 |
| Ivo Petović | 7 | – | – | – | – | – | – | – | – | – | 3.0 |
| Nemanja Petrović | Did not play | | | | | | | | | | |
| Zoran Radović | 7 | – | – | – | – | – | – | – | – | – | 13.0 |
| Dušan Stević | 6 | – | – | – | – | – | – | – | – | – | 0.7 |
| Mlađan Šilobad | 7 | – | – | – | – | – | – | – | – | – | 5.7 |
| Časlav Trifunović | 3 | – | – | – | – | – | – | – | – | – | 1.7 |
| Saša Vasić | 1 | – | – | – | – | – | – | – | – | – | 0.0 |

=== Korać Cup ===
| Player | GP | GS | MPG | 2FG% | 3FG% | FT% | RPG | APG | SPG | BPG | PPG |
|---|---|---|---|---|---|---|---|---|---|---|---|
| Dragan Aleksić | 2 | – | – | – | – | – | – | – | – | – | 0.0 |
| Rastko Cvetković | 2 | – | – | – | – | – | – | – | – | – | 4.0 |
| Srđan Dabić | 2 | – | – | – | – | – | – | – | – | – | 20.0 |
| Aleksandar Gilić | Did not play | | | | | | | | | | |
| Boban Janković | 1 | – | – | – | – | – | – | – | – | – | 8.0 |
| Zoran Jovanović | 2 | – | – | – | – | – | – | – | – | – | 14.5 |
| Slobodan Nikolić | 2 | – | – | – | – | – | – | – | – | – | 13.5 |
| Miomir Ognjenović | Did not play | | | | | | | | | | |
| Mirko Pavlović | 1 | – | – | – | – | – | – | – | – | – | 0.0 |
| Ivo Petović | 2 | – | – | – | – | – | – | – | – | – | 7.5 |
| Nemanja Petrović | Did not play | | | | | | | | | | |
| Zoran Radović | 2 | – | – | – | – | – | – | – | – | – | 13.0 |
| Dušan Stević | Did not play | | | | | | | | | | |
| Mlađan Šilobad | 2 | – | – | – | – | – | – | – | – | – | 0.0 |
| Časlav Trifunović | Did not play | | | | | | | | | | |
| Saša Vasić | 2 | – | – | – | – | – | – | – | – | – | 2.5 |

=== Yugoslav Cup ===
| Player | GP | GS | MPG | 2FG% | 3FG% | FT% | RPG | APG | SPG | BPG | PPG |
|---|---|---|---|---|---|---|---|---|---|---|---|
| Dragan Aleksić | 5 | – | – | – | – | – | – | – | – | – | 0.0 |
| Rastko Cvetković | 5 | – | – | – | – | – | – | – | – | – | 8.8 |
| Srđan Dabić | 5 | – | – | – | – | – | – | – | – | – | 11.8 |
| Aleksandar Gilić | 1 | – | – | – | – | – | – | – | – | – | 4.0 |
| Boban Janković | 2 | – | – | – | – | – | – | – | – | – | 21.0 |
| Zoran Jovanović | 5 | – | – | – | – | – | – | – | – | – | 12.4 |
| Slobodan Nikolić | 2 | – | – | – | – | – | – | – | – | – | 12.5 |
| Miomir Ognjenović | Did not play | | | | | | | | | | |
| Mirko Pavlović | 2 | – | – | – | – | – | – | – | – | – | 1.5 |
| Ivo Petović | 5 | – | – | – | – | – | – | – | – | – | 7.6 |
| Nemanja Petrović | 1 | – | – | – | – | – | – | – | – | – | 0.0 |
| Zoran Radović | 5 | – | – | – | – | – | – | – | – | – | 20.6 |
| Dušan Stević | Did not play | | | | | | | | | | |
| Mlađan Šilobad | 2 | – | – | – | – | – | – | – | – | – | 4.0 |
| Časlav Trifunović | 5 | – | – | – | – | – | – | – | – | – | 0.4 |
| Saša Vasić | 3 | – | – | – | – | – | – | – | – | – | 0.0 |
