= 1991–92 KK Crvena zvezda season =

Crvena zvezda
1991–92 season
- President: (Socialist Federal Republic of Yugoslavia) Dragiša Vučinić
- Head coach: (Socialist Federal Republic of Yugoslavia) Duško Vujošević
- Arena: Pionir Hall
- YUBA League: 2nd
- Playoffs: Runners-up
- Yugoslav Cup: Semifinals
- PIR leader: (Socialist Federal Republic of Yugoslavia) Boban Janković 25.95
- Scoring leader: (Socialist Federal Republic of Yugoslavia) Boban Janković 25.5
- Rebounding leader: (Socialist Federal Republic of Yugoslavia) Boban Janković 5.5
- Assists leader: (Socialist Federal Republic of Yugoslavia) Boban Janković 2.6
- All statistics correct as of July 30, 2019.

The 1991–92 Crvena zvezda season is the 47th season in the existence of the club. The team played in the YUBA League.

== Players ==
=== Squad information ===
Crvena zvezda roster
Players
Coaches

Pos.	No.	Nat.	Name	Ht.
F/C	10	(Socialist Federal Republic of Yugoslavia)	Cvetković, Rastko	2.08 m (6 ft 10 in)
SG	5	(Socialist Federal Republic of Yugoslavia)	Ilić, Nebojša	1.98 m (6 ft 6 in)
SF	8	(Socialist Federal Republic of Yugoslavia)	Janković, Boban	2.00 m (6 ft 7 in)
C		(Socialist Federal Republic of Yugoslavia)	Jelić, Dušan	2.10 m (6 ft 11 in)
C	9	(Socialist Federal Republic of Yugoslavia)	Jovanović, Zoran	2.12 m (6 ft 11 in)
PF	11	(Socialist Federal Republic of Yugoslavia)	Kaličanin, Slobodan	2.11 m (6 ft 11 in)
G		(Socialist Federal Republic of Yugoslavia)	Lazić, Aleksandar	1.93 m (6 ft 4 in)
G	6	(Socialist Federal Republic of Yugoslavia)	Obradović, Saša	1.97 m (6 ft 6 in)
SF	13	(Socialist Federal Republic of Yugoslavia)	Marinković, Milan	2.01 m (6 ft 7 in)
SF	7	(Socialist Federal Republic of Yugoslavia)	Marojević, Radivoj	2.00 m (6 ft 7 in)
G	15	(Socialist Federal Republic of Yugoslavia)	Mitrović, Miroljub	1.94 m (6 ft 4 in)
C	14	(Socialist Federal Republic of Yugoslavia)	Tarlać, Dragan	2.09 m (6 ft 10 in)
PF	14	(Socialist Federal Republic of Yugoslavia)	Tomašević, Dejan	2.08 m (6 ft 10 in)
SG	12	(Socialist Federal Republic of Yugoslavia)	Trifunović, Aleksandar	2.01 m (6 ft 7 in)
PG	4	(Socialist Federal Republic of Yugoslavia)	Trunić, Nenad	1.85 m (6 ft 1 in)

Head coach

- (Socialist Federal Republic of Yugoslavia) Duško Vujošević

Assistant coach(es)

- (Socialist Federal Republic of Yugoslavia) Dejan Srzić

Legend

- (C) Team captain
- Injured

=== Transactions ===
==== Players in ====
No.	Pos.	Nat.	Name	Moving from	
11	PF	(Socialist Federal Republic of Yugoslavia)	Slobodan Kaličanin	IMT	(Socialist Federal Republic of Yugoslavia)
8	SF	(Socialist Federal Republic of Yugoslavia)	Boban Janković	Vojvodina	(Socialist Federal Republic of Yugoslavia)
13	SF	(Socialist Federal Republic of Yugoslavia)	Milan Marinković	Maribor	(Slovenia)
–	PG	(Socialist Federal Republic of Yugoslavia)	Dragoljub Vidačić	Varda Višegrad	(Socialist Federal Republic of Yugoslavia)
12	SG	(Socialist Federal Republic of Yugoslavia)	Aleksandar Trifunović	Zadar	(Croatia)
4	PG	(Socialist Federal Republic of Yugoslavia)	Nenad Trunić	Smelt Olimpija	(Slovenia)
15	G	(Socialist Federal Republic of Yugoslavia)	Miroljub Mitrović	Bosna	(Socialist Federal Republic of Yugoslavia)
7	SF	(Socialist Federal Republic of Yugoslavia)	Radivoj Marojević		

==== Players out ====
No.	Pos.	Nat.	Name	Moving to	
15	SF	(Socialist Federal Republic of Yugoslavia)	Dražen Dalipagić	Retired	
12	PG	(Socialist Federal Republic of Yugoslavia)	Nebojša Bukumirović		
13	C	(Socialist Federal Republic of Yugoslavia)	Mlađan Šilobad	Partizan	(Socialist Federal Republic of Yugoslavia)
6	SG	(Socialist Federal Republic of Yugoslavia)	Slobodan Nikolić	OKK Beograd	(Socialist Federal Republic of Yugoslavia)
4	PG	(Socialist Federal Republic of Yugoslavia)	Srđan Dabić	Levski Sofia	(Bulgaria)
	C	(Socialist Federal Republic of Yugoslavia)	Mirko Joksimović		
		(Socialist Federal Republic of Yugoslavia)	Miomir Ognjenović		(United States)
		(Socialist Federal Republic of Yugoslavia)	Simić		
	F	(Socialist Federal Republic of Yugoslavia)	Saša Vasić		
8	C	(Socialist Federal Republic of Yugoslavia)	Nemanja Petrović	North Penn HS	(United States)
	PG	(Socialist Federal Republic of Yugoslavia)	Dragoljub Vidačić	Infos RTM Beograd	(Socialist Federal Republic of Yugoslavia)

== Competitions ==
=== Overall ===
Competition	Started round	Final position / round	First match	Last match
YUBA League	Matchday 1	Runners-up	October 26, 1991	May 2, 1992
Yugoslav Cup	Round of 32	Semifinals	1991	April 2, 1992

Source: Competitions

=== Overview ===
Competition	Record							
Competition	Pld	W	D	L	PF	PA	PD	Win %
YUBA League	22	15	0	7	1,838	1,759	+79	68.18
YUBA League Play-off	6	2	0	4	511	512	−1	33.33
Yugoslav Cup	4	3	0	1	294	251	+43	75.00
Total	32	20	0	12	2,643	2,522	+121	62.50

Last updated: August 2, 2019
Source: Competitions

=== YUBA League ===
==== Regular season ====
Pos	Team	Pld	W	L	PF	PA	PD	Pts	Qualification or relegation
1	Partizan Inex	22	20	2	2040	1569	+471	42	Advance to the playoffs
2	Crvena zvezda	22	15	7	1838	1759	+79	37	Advance to the playoffs
3	Rabotnički Godel	22	14	8	1814	1644	+170	36	Advance to the playoffs
4	Sloboda Dita	22	13	9	1831	1727	+104	35	Advance to the playoffs
5	Bosna	22	13	9	1909	1887	+22	35	

Source: kosarka.co.yu

Win Loss

==== Play-off ====
Source

=== Yugoslav Cup ===
Win Loss

Round of 32	OKK Beograd	73–90	Crvena zvezda

Round of 16	Crvena zvezda	20–0	Lovćen

Quarterfinals	Crvena zvezda	83–72	Spartak

2 April 1991 Semifinals	Bosna	106–101	Crvena zvezda	Niš
	Scoring by half: 51–49, 55–52
	Pts: Dejan Vukosavljević 23	Boxscore	Pts: Nebojša Ilić 46	Arena: Čair Sports Center; Attendance: 2,600; Referees: Zdravko Kurilić, Zoran Dimitrijević

== Statistics ==
Legend
GP	Games played	GS	Games started	MPG	Minutes per game
FG%	Field-goal percentage	3FG%	3-point field-goal percentage	FT%	Free-throw percentage
RPG	Rebounds per game	APG	Assists per game	SPG	Steals per game
BPG	Blocks per game	PPG	Points per game	PIR	PIR per game

Player	Left during the season
