= Rade Milutinović =

Serbian professional basketball player

Personal information
- Born: January 28, 1968 (age 58) Belgrade, SR Serbia, SFR Yugoslavia
- Listed height: 2.01 m (6 ft 7 in)
- Listed weight: 102 kg (225 lb)

Career information
- College: U.S. International (1985–1988)
- NBA draft: 1990: undrafted
- Playing career: 1988–2001
- Position: Shooting guard / small forward
- Number: 10, 11, 14, 17

Career history
- 1988–1992: IMT
- 1992–1993: Sloga
- 1993–1994: Crvena zvezda
- 1994–1995: Borovica
- Beopetrol
- 1999: Maccabi Kiryat Gat
- 2000–2001: Mitteldeutscher
- 2001: Crvena zvezda

Career highlights
- YUBA League champion (1994)
Medals
Men's basketball
Representing Yugoslavia
European Championship for Cadets
Gold medal – first place	1985 Bulgaria	Team

Rade Milutinović (Serbian Cyrillic: Раде Милутиновић; born January 28, 1968) is a Serbian former professional basketball player.

== College career ==
Milutinović played college basketball for the San Diego–based U.S. International University.

== Playing career ==
Milutinović had two stints for Crvena zvezda of the Yugoslav League. In the 1993–94 season, he won the Yugoslav League with Zvezda and played together with Dragoljub Vidačić, Ivica Mavrenski, Saša Obradović, Mileta Lisica, Aleksandar Trifunović, and Dejan Tomašević.

In the 2000–01 season, Milutinović played for German team Mitteldeutscher. During that season his team played FIBA Korać Cup where he averaged 14.8 points, 4.0 rebounds and 3.0 assists per game over four tournaments games. He also played in Israel and Slovenia.

== National team career ==
Milutinović was a member of the Yugoslavia cadet national team that won the gold medal at the 1985 FIBA Europe Championship for Cadets. Over four tournament games, he averaged 4.3 points per game.

== Career achievements ==
- Yugoslav League champion: 1 (with Crvena zvezda: 1993–94)
- Yugoslav Super Cup winner: 1 (with Crvena zvezda: 1993)
