= Aleksandar Gilić =

Serbian basketball player

Aleksandar Gilić Александар Гилић
Personal information
- Born: November 28, 1969 (age 56) Sombor, SR Serbia, SFR Yugoslavia
- Listed height: 2.10 m (6 ft 10 1/2 in)

Career information
- NBA draft: 1991: undrafted
- Playing career: 1987–2009
- Position: Center
- Number: 9, 8, 5, 16, 12

Career history
- 1988–1990: Crvena zvezda
- 1991–1992: Infos RTM
- 1992–1993: Radnički Belgrade
- 1993–1996: Crvena zvezda
- 1996–1997: Budućnost
- 1997–1998: Žito Vardar
- 1998–1999: Partizan
- 1999: Pivovarna Laško
- 1999–2000: Hapoel Jerusalem
- 2001: TSK uniVersa Bamberg
- 2005–2006: Radnički Belgrade
- 2007: Leotar Trebinje
- 2007–2008: ETHA Engomis
- 2008–2009: Radnički Belgrade

Career highlights
- YUBA League champion (1994); Yugoslav Super Cup winner (1993); FR Yugoslavia Cup winner (1999)

Aleksandar Gilić (Serbian Cyrillic: Александар Гилић; born January 28, 1968) is a Serbian former professional basketball player.

== Playing career ==
Gilić played for the Crvena zvezda, Budućnost Podgorica and Partizan of the Yugoslav League. In the 1993–94 season, he won the Yugoslav League with Zvezda and played together with Dragoljub Vidačić, Ivica Mavrenski, Saša Obradović, Mileta Lisica, Aleksandar Trifunović, and Dejan Tomašević.

In 1999, he went abroad. During next couple of years he played in Slovenia (Pivovarna Laško), Israel (Hapoel Jerusalem), Germany (TSK uniVersa Bamberg), Cyprus (ETHA Engomis) and Bulgaria.

Later, Gilić also played for the Radnički Belgrade of the Second League of Serbia.

== Career achievements ==
- Yugoslav League champion: 1 (with Crvena zvezda: 1993–94)
- Yugoslav Super Cup winner: 1 (with Crvena zvezda: 1993)
- FR Yugoslavia Cup winner: 1 (with Partizan: 1999)
