= Milan Opačić =

Serbian basketball player and coach

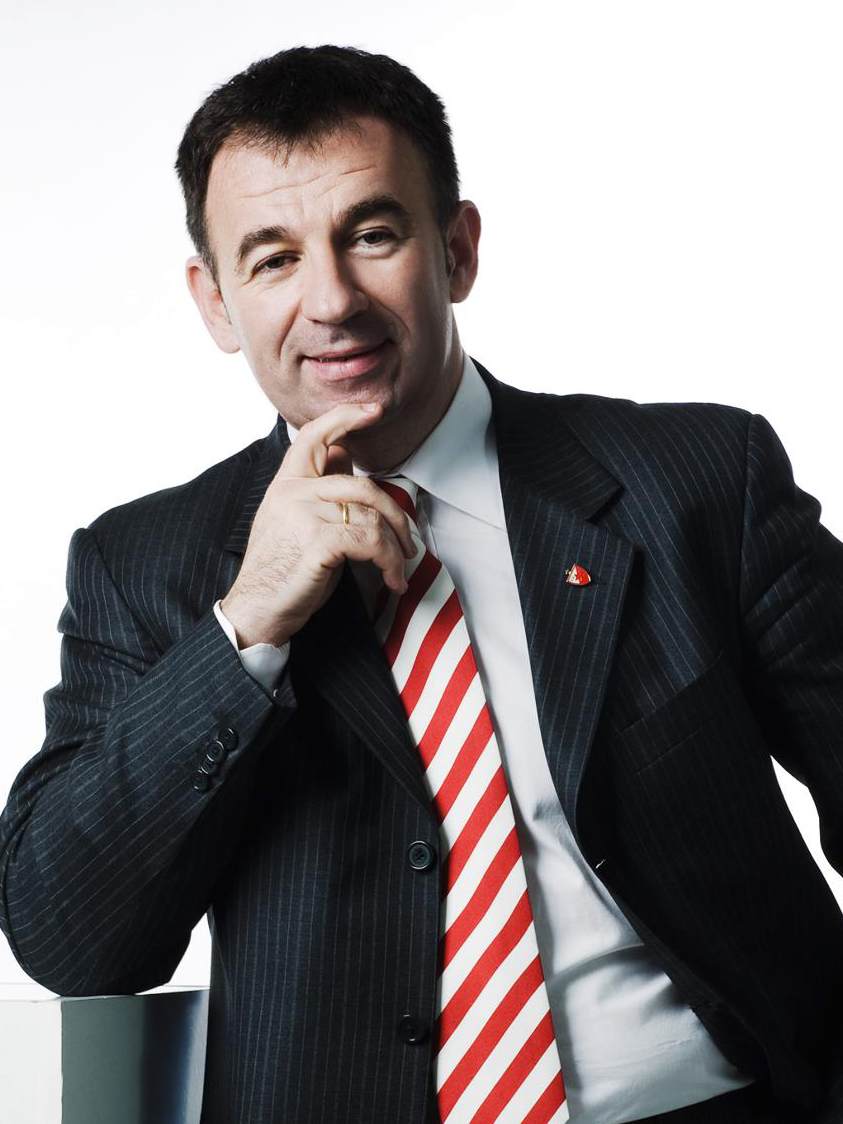

Personal information
- Born: 16 July 1960 (age 66) Užička Požega, FPR Yugoslavia

Career information
- NBA draft: 1982: undrafted
- Playing career: 1976–1986
- Position: Point guard
- Coaching career: 1980–2000, 2018

Career history

Playing
- 1976–1980: Mladost Zemun
- 1980–1986: KK Užička Republika

Coaching
- 1980–1986: KK Užička Republika
- 1986–1988: KK Vojvoda Stepa
- 1988–1990: KK Užička Republika
- 1990–1992: Infos RTM Beograd (associate)
- 1992–1996: KK ABM Neterstim
- 1999–2000: KK Torlak
- 2018: Tamil Nadu state team

Career highlights
- Indian Championship champion (2018)

Milan Opačić (Serbian Cyrillic: Милан Опачић; born 16 July 1960) is a Serbian basketball administrator, coach and sports manager.

Opačić is a former executive director of the Association of Basketball Coaches of Yugoslavia and former general manager of Crvena zvezda.

== Early life and career ==
Opačić was born in Užička Požega, FPR Yugoslavia (now Serbia). He attended the 13 October Gymnasium in Paraćin (1975–76) and the Zemun Gymnasium (1976–1979). While he trained basketball at young age, Opačić played at a point guard position, and his role model was Zoran Moka Slavnić. He graduated from the University of Belgrade, Faculty of Mechanical Engineering and later from the Basketball College. Opačić was assistant to maintenance director at PVC Petrohemija in Pančevo from 1987 to 1988 and a senior independent constructor at the Military Technical Institute Belgrade from 1988 to 1994.

== Basketball career ==
Opačić worked as an engineer for a while, and then devoted himself entirely to basketball. During 1980s he was a head coach for KK Užička Republika and KK Vojvoda Stepa, Belgrade-based teams in the 5th-tier and 3rd-tier leagues. From 1990 to 1992, he was a chief of coaching staff for Infos RTM Belgrade of the YUBA League. Afterwards, Opačić was a head coach for Belgrade-based team KK ABM Neterstim, between 1992 and 1996.

Opačić was the general manager for Crvena zvezda from 2008 to 2010, when Nemanja Bjelica, Tadija Dragićević, Elmedin Kikanović, Marko Kešelj, Nemanja Nedović, Vladimir Štimac played for this club. From 2011 to 2019, he was an FIBA expert associate at its headquarters in Geneva and as the head coach of the Tamil Nadu state team from Chennai he won the Indian National Basketball Championship in 2018. He currently lives and works as the technical director of FIBA BG Basketball Academy in Beijing.

Milan Opačić is the founder, owner and former director (until 2019) of the international basketball camp YUBAC, which has a license from the Basketball Association of Serbia and which is the only camp in the ex-Yugoslavia region that organized the FIBA competition. Željko Obradović, Dušan Ivković, Duško Vujošević, Igor Kokoškov, Svetislav Pešić, Aleksandar Đorđević and others took part in the work of this camp, whose promoter is Vasilije Micić.

Opačić is a member of the Executive Board of FIBA's World Association of Basketball Coaches (FIBA WABC).

Milan Opačić is a participant and organizer of relevant coaching seminars with Don Nelson, Gregg Popovich, Larry Brown, Rubén Magnano, Ettore Messina, Pini Gershon, Pablo Laso, Sergio Scariolo, Svetislav Pešić and Božidar Maljković. He was a lecturer at professional coaching seminars in Austria in 1997 and Russia in 1998, executive director of the Basketball Clinic Belgrade (Serbian Cyrillic: Београдски кошаркашки семинар) from 2002 to 2006, organized by the Association of Basketball Coaches of Serbia, and publisher and member of the editorial board from the first issue of the magazine Coach (Serbian Cyrillic: Тренер). He created Basketball Time Planner in 2005.

Sporting positions
Preceded by N/A	Sports Director of Al-Ahli Benghazi; 2016–2017	Succeeded by N/A
Preceded by Andrija Kleut	General Мanager of KK Crvena zvezda 2008–2010	Succeeded by Mirko Pavlović
