= 1993–94 YUBA League =

2nd edition of YUBA League

- League: YUBA League
- Season: 1993–94
- Dates: 25 September 1993 – 1 February 1994 (First stage)
- Games played: 32 each
- Teams: 12

Regular season
- Top seed: Partizan, 27–5
- Season MVP: (Federal Republic of Yugoslavia) Mijailo Grušanović

Finals
- Champions: Crvena zvezda
- Runners-up: Partizan

Statistical leaders
Points	(Federal Republic of Yugoslavia) Slađan Stojković	28.0
Rebounds	(Federal Republic of Yugoslavia) Milenko Topić	8.4
Assists	(Federal Republic of Yugoslavia) Zoran Sretenović	2.9
Efficiency	(Federal Republic of Yugoslavia) Željko Rebrača	0.77

Seasons
- ← 1992–93 1994–95 →

The 1993–94 YUBA League (Serbian Cyrillic: ЈУБА лига 1993/94.) was the second season of the YUBA League, the top-tier professional basketball league in Yugoslavia (later renamed to Serbia and Montenegro).

== Teams ==
A total of 12 teams participated in the 1993–94 YUBA League.

=== Distribution ===
The following is the access list for this season.

Access list for the 1993–94 YUBA League
	Teams entering in this round	Teams advancing from the previous round
Regular season (12 teams)	10 highest-placed teams from the last season; 2 highest-placed teams from the B League	
Blue League (6 teams)		6 highest-placed teams from the Regular season
White League (6 teams)		6 lowest-placed teams from the Regular season
Playoffs (12 teams)	2 highest-placed teams from the YUBA B League	6 highest-placed teams from the Blue League; 4 highest-placed teams from the White League

=== Venues and locations ===
Location of clubs in the 1993–94 season

Club	Home city	Arena	Capacity
Big Enex Metalac	Valjevo	Valjevo Sports Hall	1,500
Bobanik	Kraljevo	Kraljevo Sports Hall	3,350
Budućnost Demetra	Podgorica	Morača Hall	4,300
Crvena zvezda	Belgrade	Pionir Hall	5,878
Iva Borovica	Šabac	Zorka Hall	2,300
Lovćen	Cetinje	Lovćen Sports Center	1,500
Mornar VOLI	Bar		
OKK InvestEksport	Belgrade	SC Šumice	2,000
Partizan Sintelon	Belgrade	Pionir Hall	5,878
Profikolor	Pančevo		
Radnički	Belgrade	SC Šumice	2,000
Spartak	Subotica	Dudova Šuma Hall	3,000

=== Personnel ===
Team	Head coach	Captain
Big Enex Metalac	(Federal Republic of Yugoslavia) Vojislav Kecojević	
Bobanik	(Federal Republic of Yugoslavia) Gordan Marković / (Federal Republic of Yugoslavia) Srboljub Đorđević	
Budućnost	(Federal Republic of Yugoslavia) Goran Bojanić	
Crvena zvezda	(Federal Republic of Yugoslavia) Vladislav Lučić	(Federal Republic of Yugoslavia) Aleksandar Trifunović
InvestEksport	(Federal Republic of Yugoslavia) Rajko Žižić / (Federal Republic of Yugoslavia) Gordan Todorović	
Iva Borovica	(Federal Republic of Yugoslavia) Milovan Stepandić	(Federal Republic of Yugoslavia) Mijailo Grušanović
Lovćen	(Federal Republic of Yugoslavia) Veselin Kašćelan	
Mornar	(Federal Republic of Yugoslavia) Mihailo Pavićević	(Federal Republic of Yugoslavia) Dušan Pavlović
Partizan	(Federal Republic of Yugoslavia) Željko Lukajić	
Profi Color	(North Macedonia) Janko Lukovski	
Radnički	(Federal Republic of Yugoslavia) Slobodan Ivković	
Spartak	(Federal Republic of Yugoslavia) Goran Mijović / (Federal Republic of Yugoslavia) Zoran Kovačević	(Federal Republic of Yugoslavia) Slobodan Jaramazović

== First stage ==
=== Standings ===
Pos	Team	Pld	W	L	PF	PA	PD	Pts	Qualification or relegation
1	Partizan Sintelon	22	20	2	2006	1702	+304	42	Qualification to Blue League
2	Crvena zvezda	22	16	6	1884	1752	+132	38	Qualification to Blue League
3	Profikolor	22	13	9	1986	1876	+110	35	Qualification to Blue League
4	Spartak	22	13	9	1856	1777	+79	35	Qualification to Blue League
5	Iva Borovica	22	13	9	1856	1820	+36	35	Qualification to Blue League
6	Radnički Belgrade	22	11	11	1916	1893	+23	33	Qualification to Blue League
7	Mornar VOLI	22	9	13	1848	1917	−69	31	Qualification to White League
8	Bobanik	22	8	14	1780	1853	−73	30	Qualification to White League
9	Lovćen	22	8	14	1775	1891	−116	30	Qualification to White League
10	Big Enex Metalac	22	8	14	1774	1925	−151	30	Qualification to White League
11	Budućnost Demetra	22	7	15	1817	1797	+20	29	Qualification to White League
12	OKK InvestEksport	22	6	16	1933	2096	−163	28	Qualification to White League

Source: OKK Beograd, Partizanopedia

=== Results ===
Home \ Away	PAR	CZV	PRO	SPA	IVA	RAD	MOR	BOB	LOV	MET	BUD	OKK
Partizan	—	74–70	84–70	94–77	85–78	93–62	93–71	101–68	86–75	91–78	101–76	125–117
Crvena Zvezda	67–81	—	89–86	87–92	70–71	88–84	101–88	83–81		115–72	101–77	80–68
Profikolor	85–97	77–80	—	98–81	84–70	77–68		97–73	90–80	114–89	95–73	98–90
Spartak	65–61	103–89	90–76	—	76–74	93–94	92–73	98–90	87–73	82–76		109–77
Iva Borovica	93–83	93–109	82–76	75–73	—	107–99	86–74	93–84	84–70		94–89	89–80
Radnički Belgrade	78–101	86–89	109–100	77–67	106–96	—	90–88	91–73	92–79	78–71	96–69	94–100
Mornar	63–79	90–101	120–126	93–84	78–73	72–67	—	81–79	84–79	92–83	119–88	82–72
Bobanik	89–93	88–86	83–84	75–73	76–72	87–93	79–84	—	86–69	86–80	95–82	
Lovćen	77–79	81–88	104–98	83–73	73–75	83–73	85–81	67–64	—	106–104	71–60	92–84
Big Enex Metalac	66–92	86–93	81–78	64–70	78–66	72–71	76–73	89–76	86–79	—	80–68	96–92
Budućnost	90–111	78–81	77–83	93–84	93–103		88–76	86–76	110–103	96–80	—	97–91
OKK InvestEksport	87–102	83–91	80–91	90–103	87–86	113–118	93–80		91–76	102–91	85–80	—

Source: Partizanopedia.rs
Legend: Blue = home team win; Red = away team win.
Matches with lighter background shading were decided after overtime.

== Second stage ==
=== Standings ===
Pos	Team	Pld	W	L	PF	PA	PD	Pts	Qualification or relegation
1	Partizan Sintelon	32	27	5	2849	2516	+333	59	Qualification to Playoffs
2	Crvena zvezda	32	23	9	2929	2743	+186	55	Qualification to Playoffs
3	Iva Borovica	32	19	13	2698	2645	+53	51	Qualification to Playoffs
4	Profikolor	32	18	14	2893	2787	+106	50	Qualification to Playoffs
5	Spartak	32	16	16	2652	2616	+36	48	Qualification to Playoffs
6	Radnički Belgrade	32	13	19	2771	2807	−36	45	Qualification to Playoffs
7	Mornar VOLI	32	15	17	2724	2770	−46	47	Qualification to Playoffs
8	Bobanik	32	14	18	2656	2674	−18	46	Qualification to Playoffs
9	Big Enex Metalac	32	14	18	2562	2715	−153	46	Qualification to Playoffs
10	Lovćen	32	14	18	2549	2630	−81	46	Qualification to Playoffs
11	Budućnost Demetra	32	12	20	2624	2777	−153	44	
12	OKK InvestEksport	32	7	25	2725	2944	−219	39	

Source: kosarka.co.yu, OKK Beograd, Partizanopedia

=== Results ===
Blue League

Home \ Away	PAR	CZV	IVA	PRO	SPA	RAD
Partizan	—	83–80	72–62	96–92	80–96	80–66
Crvena Zvezda	87–89	—	88–75	105–103	104–87	93–69
Iva Borovica	83–82	106–92	—	90–75		98–91
Profikolor	89–82	109–113	89–86	—	71–64	105–108
Spartak	71–87	100–109	78–60	68–76	—	85–80
Radnički Belgrade	88–92		85–95	97–98	85–74	—

Source: Partizanopedia.rs
Legend: Blue = home team win; Red = away team win.
Matches with lighter background shading were decided after overtime.

White League

Home \ Away	MOR	BOB	MET	LOV	BUD	OKK
Mornar	—		84–74	79–68	109–100	86–69
Bobanik	102–80	—	99–71	75–70	80–76	106–96
Big Enex Metalac	84–73	92–90	—	89–77	74–63	72–70
Lovćen	86–78	82–76	106–104	—	72–70	89–72
Budućnost	95–92		86–79		—	90–79
OKK InvestEksport	88–99	84–98		84–82		—

Source: Partizanopedia.rs
Legend: Blue = home team win; Red = away team win.
Matches with lighter background shading were decided after overtime.

== Playoffs ==
=== Bracket ===
First round
Bobanik	2
Big Enex Metalac	1
Spartak	2
Privredna banka	0
Mornar	2
Lovćen	1
Radnički	2
Elkond	0

Quarterfinals
Partizan	2
Bobanik	0
Profi Color	2
Spartak	1
Crvena zvezda	2
Mornar	0
Iva Borovica	2
Radnički	1

Semifinals
Partizan	3
Profi Color	0
Crvena zvezda	3
Iva Borovica	0

Finals
Partizan	1
Crvena zvezda	4

=== Finals ===
Team 1	Series	Team 2	Game 1	Game 2	Game 3	Game 4	Game 5	Game 6	Game 7
Partizan	1–4	Crvena zvezda	64–77	85–99	88–103	78–69	79–80	—	—

==== Game 1 ====
6 May 1994

Recap

Partizan 64, Crvena zvezda 77
Scoring by half: 26–44, 38–33
Pts: Stevanović, Sretenović 13 each Rebs: Željko Rebrača 9 Asts: Rebrača, Sretenović 2 each	Pts: Aleksandar Trifunović 18; Rebs: Mileta Lisica 12; Asts: Obradović, Lisica, Trifunović 1 each
Crvena zvezda leads series, 1–0

Pionir Hall, Belgrade
Attendance: 4,500

==== Game 2 ====
7 May 1994

Recap

Partizan 85, Crvena zvezda 99
Scoring by half: 46–46, 39–53
Pts: Nikola Lončar 33; Rebs: Željko Rebrača 10; Asts: Željko Rebrača 1	Pts: Saša Obradović 26; Rebs: Aleksandar Gilić 11; Asts: Obradović, Lisica 2 each
Crvena zvezda leads series, 2–0

Pionir Hall, Belgrade
Attendance: 5,000

==== Game 3 ====
10 May 1994

Recap

Crvena zvezda 103, Partizan 88
Scoring by half: 42–41, 61–47
Pts: Saša Obradović 24; Rebs: Lisica, Tomašević 4 each Asts: Aleksandar Trifunović 2	Pts: Nikola Lončar 25; Rebs: Zoran Stevanović 5 Asts: None
Crvena zvezda leads series, 3–0

Pionir Hall, Belgrade
Attendance: 7,000

==== Game 4 ====
11 May 1994

Recap

Crvena zvezda 69, Partizan 78
Scoring by half: 33–34, 36–44
Pts: Mileta Lisica 17; Rebs: Mileta Lisica 9 Asts: Obradović, Trifunović 2 each	Pts: Nikola Lončar 16; Rebs: Zoran Stevanović 7 Asts: Zoran Sretenović 2
Crvena zvezda leads series, 3–1

Pionir Hall, Belgrade
Attendance: 7,500

==== Game 5 ====
12 May 1994

Recap

Crvena zvezda 80, Partizan 79
Scoring by half: 43–36, 37–43
Pts: Mileta Lisica 21; Rebs: Lisica, Trifunović 5 each Asts: Aleksandar Trifunović 1	Pts: Zoran Sretenović 17; Rebs: Željko Rebrača 6 Asts: Lončar, Brkić 1 each
Crvena zvezda wins YUBA Finals, 4–1

Pionir Hall, Belgrade

== Yugoslav Super Cup ==
Season	Date	League Champion	Result	Cup Winner	Ref.
1993–94	December 1993	Crvena zvezda	83–78	OKK Beograd	

== Clubs in European competitions ==
Following the adoption of economic sanctions by the international community against FR Yugoslavia, clubs were banned to compete in the European professional club basketball system.

== See also ==
- 1993–94 Yugoslav Super Cup
- 1993–94 ACB season
- 1993–94 Slovenian Basketball League
