= 1991–92 YUBA League =

YUBA League
- Season: 1991–92
- Teams: 12

Regular season
- Relegated: Infos RTM

Finals
- Champions: Partizan (5th title)
- Runners-up: Crvena zvezda
- Semi-finalists: Rabotnički; Sloboda Dita

Statistical leaders
Points	(Socialist Federal Republic of Yugoslavia) Boban Janković	25.5
Rebounds	(Socialist Federal Republic of Yugoslavia) Sejo Bukva	7.9
Assists	(Socialist Federal Republic of Yugoslavia) Boban Janković	2.6
Index Rating	(Socialist Federal Republic of Yugoslavia) Boban Janković	25.95
- All statistics correct as of June 5, 2020.

The 1991–92 YUBA League (also known as 1991–92 YUBA Wiener Broker League for sponsorship reasons) was a transitional season of Yugoslav Basketball League, top level Yugoslav basketball competition, first under newly formed Yugoslav Basketball Association (YUBA), and the last that started in SFR Yugoslavia.

== Teams ==
YUBA was founded to promote professional basketball in Yugoslavia independent of political situation and when the draw was held in June 1991, following 12 clubs were supposed to contest the league: Slobodna Dalmacija Split, Partizan Inex, Cibona, Zadar, Vojvodina, Infos RTM, Smelt Olimpija, Bosna, Crvena Zvezda, Sloboda Dita, Oveco Zagreb and Godel Rabotnički.

Later, due to Yugoslav Wars, all teams from Slovenia and Croatia abandoned the competition and were replaced with new clubs from the Yugoslav 1. B Federal Basketball League. An impromptu entry tournament for four 1.B Federal League teams—KK Prvi partizan Titovo Užice (soon to have its name changed to KK Užice), KK Spartak Subotica, KK Čelik Zenica, and MZT Skopje—was organized during October 1991 in Titograd.

=== Venues and locations ===
Location of teams in the 1991–92 season

Team	Home city	Arena	Capacity
Bosna	Sarajevo	Zetra Hall	12,000
Budućnost	Podgorica	Morača Sports Center	5,500
Cibona	Zagreb	Cibona SC	5,400
Crvena zvezda	Belgrade	Pionir Hall	5,878
Infos RTM	Belgrade	New Belgrade Hall	5,000
Oveco Zagreb	Zagreb		
Partizan Inex	Belgrade	Pionir Hall	5,878
Slobodna Dalmacija	Split	Arena Gripe	6,000
Godel Rabotnički	Skopje	Sala Gradski Park	2,500
Radnički Beograd	Belgrade	SC Šumice	2,000
Sloboda Dita	Tuzla	SKPC Mejdan	4,900
Prvi partizan	Užice	Veliki Park Hall	2,200
Sloga	Kraljevo		
Smelt Olimpija	Ljubljana	Tivoli Hall	4,000
Spartak	Subotica	SC Dudova Šuma	3,000
Vojvodina	Novi Sad	SPC Vojvodina	6,987
Zadar	Zadar	Jazine Hall	3,000

== Regular season ==
=== League table ===
Pos	Team	Pld	W	L	PF	PA	PD	Pts	Qualification or relegation
1	Partizan Inex	22	20	2	2040	1569	+471	42	Advance to the playoffs
2	Crvena zvezda	22	15	7	1838	1759	+79	37	Advance to the playoffs
3	Rabotnički Godel	22	14	8	1814	1644	+170	36	Advance to the playoffs
4	Sloboda Dita	22	13	9	1831	1727	+104	35	Advance to the playoffs
5	Bosna	22	13	9	1909	1887	+22	35	
6	Spartak	22	13	9	1703	1765	−62	35	
7	Užice	22	10	12	1749	1870	−121	32	
8	Vojvodina	22	9	13	1789	1887	−98	31	
9	Radnički Belgrade	22	8	14	1940	2002	−62	30	
10	Budućnost	22	8	14	1739	1870	−131	30	
11	Sloga	22	7	15	1795	1869	−74	29	
12	Infos RTM	22	2	20	1751	2029	−278	24	Relegation to Second Division

Source: kosarka.co.yu

== Results ==
Home \ Away	PAR	CZV	RAB	SLT	BOS	SPA	KKU	VOJ	RAD	BUD	SLO	IMT
Partizan	—	87–67	109–110	88–86	114–81	103–60	93–73	99–68	93–80	102–63	96–79	99–67
Crvena Zvezda	50–72	—	98–93	77–69	71–88	86–63	79–69	94–74	87–98	79–68	76–72	89–71
Rabotnički	62–72	67–78	—	76–69	99–90	75–55	77–79	74–70	103–79	89–66	81–58	107–82
Sloboda Tuzla	70–97	86–82	62–59	—	96–62	79–78	92–72	85–79	92–82	100–84	90–80	110–70
Bosna	95–94	80–90	72–71	85–75	—	90–67	110–92	99–86	96–89	89–74	86–87	88–73
Spartak Subotica	81–86	72–82	59–89	83–81	77–70	—	78–85	84–80	85–79	82–65	74–72	80–72
Užice	71–90	74–92	61–77	76–70	98–87	86–91	—	88–86	84–93	83–71	74–71	76–63
Vojvodina	79–80	106–86	71–62	96–101	83–95	79–81	84–70	—	93–103	90–84	96–80	83–79
Radnički Belgrade	82–95	97–112	77–85	76–75	111–86	79–94	97–98	83–92	—	94–88	117–111	93–78
Budućnost	57–82	97–88	88–74	81–68	80–74	68–82	96–69	65–73	71–70	—	113–108	86–80
Sloga	73–83	80–89	70–73	68–78	85–86	74–90	87–73	88–74	91–85	90–73	—	92–85
Infos RTM	83–106	76–86	79–91	76–96	74–98	85–90	89–98	97–105	91–76	104–100	77–79	—

Source: Partizanopedia.rs
Legend: Blue = home team win; Red = away team win.
Matches with lighter background shading were decided after overtime.

== Playoff ==
Semifinals
1	Partizan	2
4	Sloboda Dita	0
2	Crvena Zvezda	2
3	Rabotnički	1

Finals
1	Partizan	3
2	Crvena Zvezda	0

== Winning roster ==
The winning roster of Partizan:

- (Socialist Federal Republic of Yugoslavia) Igor Perović
- (Socialist Federal Republic of Yugoslavia) Željko Rebrača
- (Socialist Federal Republic of Yugoslavia) Zoran Stevanović
- (Socialist Federal Republic of Yugoslavia) Vladimir Dragutinović
- (Socialist Federal Republic of Yugoslavia) Dragiša Šarić
- (Socialist Federal Republic of Yugoslavia) Mlađan Šilobad
- (Socialist Federal Republic of Yugoslavia) Igor Mihajlovski
- (Socialist Federal Republic of Yugoslavia) Nikola Lončar
- (Socialist Federal Republic of Yugoslavia) Aleksandar Đorđević
- (Socialist Federal Republic of Yugoslavia) Predrag Danilović
- (Socialist Federal Republic of Yugoslavia) Slaviša Koprivica
- (Socialist Federal Republic of Yugoslavia) Ivo Nakić

Coach: (Socialist Federal Republic of Yugoslavia) Želimir Obradović

== See also ==
- 1991–92 KK Crvena zvezda season
- 1991–92 KK Partizan season
