= Mirko Pavlović =

Serbian basketball player and executive

Dynamic Belgrade
- Title: Sports Director
- League: Basketball League of Serbia

Personal information
- Born: April 21, 1971 (age 55) Belgrade, SR Serbia, SFR Yugoslavia
- Listed height: 2.03 m (6 ft 8 in)

Career information
- College: Southern Illinois (1990–1994)
- NBA draft: 1994: undrafted
- Playing career: 1989–1999
- Position: Power forward
- Number: 11, 14

Career history
- 1989–1990, 1994–1997: Crvena zvezda
- 1998–1999: Sloven Ruma
Medals
Men's basketball
Representing Yugoslavia
European Championship for Cadets
Gold medal – first place	1987 Hungary	Team
European Championship for Juniors
Gold medal – first place	1988 Yugoslavia	Team

Mirko Pavlović (Serbian Cyrillic: Мирко Павловић; born April 21, 1971) is a Serbian professional basketball executive and former player. He currently serves as the sports director for Dynamic Belgrade and a director of the Ranko Žeravica Sports Hall. He played college basketball for the Southern Illinois Salukis.

== Early life ==
Pavlović was born in Belgrade, Yugoslavia, to Tihomir and Olga Pavlović. His father was a basketball player who played for Crvena zvezda during 1960s and early 1970s.

== College career ==
Pavlović played college basketball for Southern Illinois Salukis from 1990 to 1994. He appeared in all 29 games in his senior season, 1993–94, season and averaged 11.8 points, 4.4 rebounds and 2.3 assists per game.

== Professional career ==
Pavlović grew up with the Crvena zvezda Juniors. He began his professional career with the Zvezda in the 1989–90 season. In 1990, Pavlović moved to the United States to play college basketball for the Southern Illinois Salukis.

After going undrafted in the 1994 NBA draft, Pavlović moved back to Belgrade and signed with Crvena zvezda for three more seasons. He was the team captain in the 1996–97 season.

== National team career ==
Pavlović was a member of the Yugoslavia national cadets team that won the gold medal at the 1987 European Championship for Cadets in Hungary. Over six tournament games, he averaged 3.0 points per game. Pavlović was a member of the Yugoslavia national junior team that won the gold medal at the 1988 FIBA Europe Under-18 Championship in Yugoslavia. Over three tournament games, he averaged 4.3 points per game. Also, he was a team member of the Junior team that finished 5th at the 1990 FIBA Europe Under-18 Championship in the Netherlands. Over three tournament games, Pavlović averaged 8.0 points per game.

== Basketball executive career ==
=== Crvena zvezda (2002–2017) ===
In February 2002, Pavlović was named as the coordinator of the youth teams for Crvena zvezda. In August 2007, he got promoted to the deputy sports director. Also, he was a team manager from August 2007 to December 2008.

In March 2010, Pavlović became a general manager for Crvena zvezda. In October 2015, Davor Ristović succeeded him on that position, while he was named as a sports director. In August 2017, Pavlović left the sports director post.

=== Olimpija Ljubljana ===
In November 2018, Pavlović was named as an assistant of general manager and senior advisor of basketball operations for Slovenian team Petrol Olimpija. He parted ways with Olimpija in March 2019.

=== Dynamic Belgrade ===
On May 29, 2019, Pavlović was named as a sports director for Serbian team Dynamic Belgrade.

== See also ==
- List of father-and-son combinations who have played for Crvena zvezda
- List of KK Crvena zvezda players with 100 games played
- List of European basketball players in the United States

Sporting positions
Preceded by Miroslav Nikolić	Sports Director of KK Dynamic; 2019–present	Succeeded by Incumbent
Preceded by Milan Opačić	General Мanager of KK Crvena zvezda 2010–2015	Succeeded by Davor Ristović
Preceded by N/A	Sports Director of KK Crvena zvezda 2015–2017	Succeeded by Nebojša Ilić
