= Lukoil Serbia =

Serbian petroleum company

- Official logo
- Native name: Лукоил Србија
- Type: Limited Liability Company
- Traded as: BELEX: LOIL
- Industry: Petroleum industry
- Predecessor: Beopetrol
- Founded: 7 December 1990; 35 years ago
- Headquarters: Bulevar Mihajla Pupina 165d, Belgrade, Serbia
- Key people: Denis Ryupin (general director)
- Products: Petroleum; Natural gas Petrochemicals
- Services: Filling stations
- Revenue: ▲€343.9 million (2024)
- Net income: ▲€7.8 million (2024)
- Total assets: ▼€42.24 million (2017)
- Total equity: €0 (2017)
- Owner: Lukoil International GmbH (100%)
- Number of employees: 140 (2025)
- Parent: Lukoil
- Website: www.lukoil.rs

Lukoil Serbia (full name: Društvo za promet naftnih derivata Lukoil Srbija a.d.) is a Serbian petroleum company with headquarters in Belgrade, Serbia. Wholly owned by Lukoil International GmbH, the company operates in Serbia, North Macedonia, Montenegro, and Croatia while its main activities are the retail and wholesale trade of oil and oil derivatives in Serbia.

== History ==
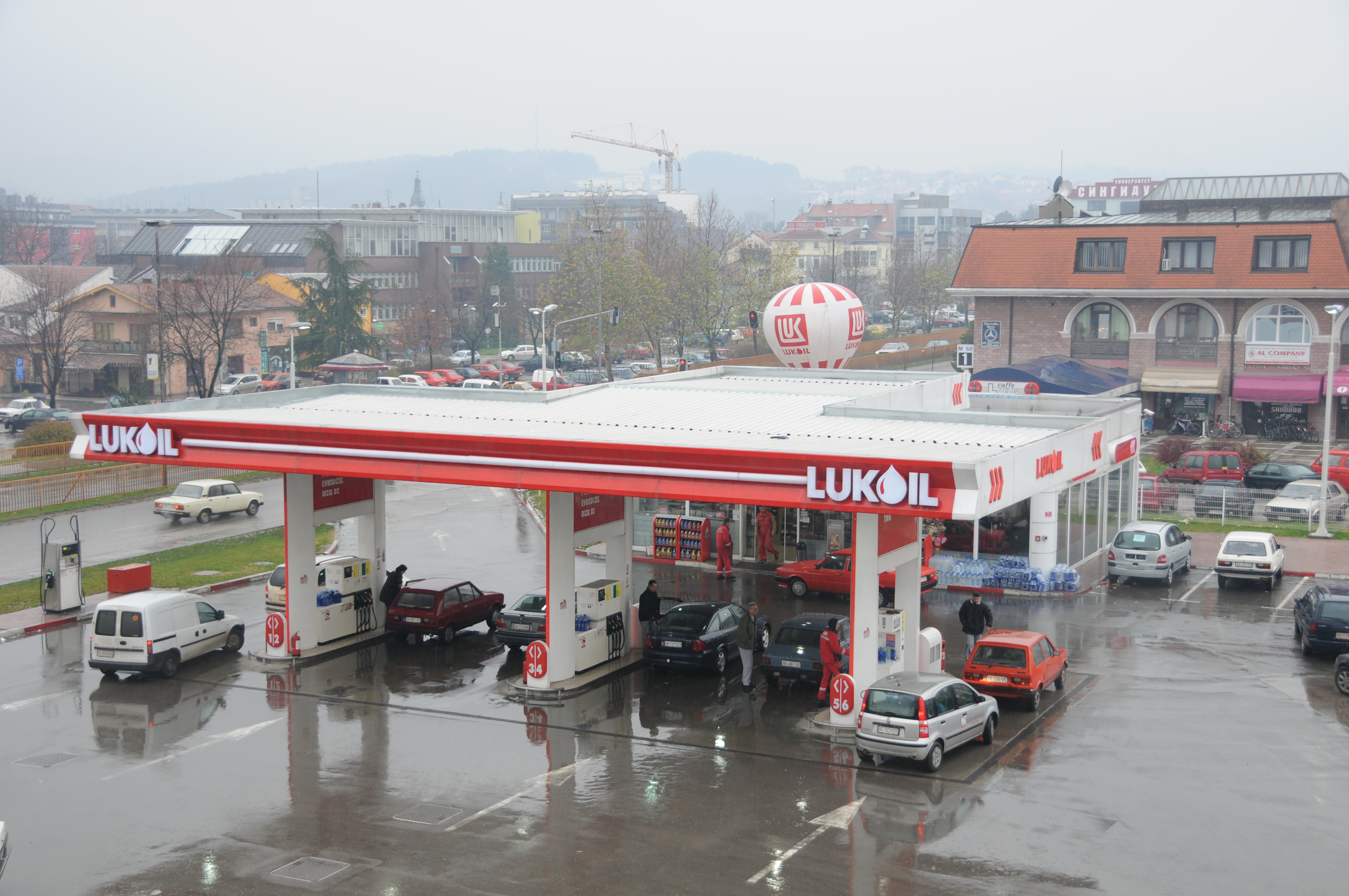
Lukoil Gas station in Valjevo

The company was established in the midst of breakup of Yugoslavia. On 7 December 1990, the unit of INA Trgovina in Serbia unilaterally formed a separate company and by 1991, it started to operate all INA properties in Serbia, including 200 petrol stations, nine warehouses, around a hundred trucks and 40 tank-trucks, and several vehicle maintenance shops. In May 1992, the company was renamed to Beopetrol.

On 26 September 2003, the Privatization Agency of the Government of Serbia sold Beopetrol to Lukoil. Lukoil paid €207 million for 79.5% of shares. Another company which participated in the privatization tender was Hungarian MOL Group. After privatization the company was renamed Lukoil-Beopetrol.

In August 2022, the company changed its legal form from a joint-stock company to a Društvo sa Ograničenom Odgovornošću (limited liability company), following the withdrawal of its shares from the Belgrade Stock Exchange in June and the acquisition of the it's shares by Lukoil International GmbH.

As of 2025, Lukoil Serbia was the second largest petroleum company in Serbia in terms of market network with 112 filling stations.

In January 2026, U.S.-based Carlyle Group agreed to buy Lukoil International GmbH, after U.S. sanctions were extended to its parent company Lukoil in October 2025.
