= Marin Sedlaček =

Serbian basketball coach

Personal information
- Born: 9 July 1959 (age 67) Belgrade, PR Serbia, FPR Yugoslavia

Career information
- College: University of Belgrade
- Coaching career: 1979–1999

Career history

Coaching
- 1979–1988: Crvena zvezda (youth)
- 1988–1991: Crvena zvezda (assistant)
- 1991–1992: Srem
- 1992–1993: Crvena zvezda (assistant)
- 1993–1995: Alvik
- 1995–1996: Hemofarm
- 1999: Partizan (assistant)
- 2003–2010: Memphis Grizzlies (scout)
- 2010–2022: Philadelphia 76ers (scout)

Marin Sedlaček (Serbian Cyrillic: Марин Седлачек; born 9 July 1959) is a Serbian professional basketball coach and scout.

== Basketball career ==
Sedlaček growing up playing basketball for the Crvena zvezda youth system. Eventually, he started his coaching career at the age of 20. He graduated as basketball coach from the Faculty of Sport and Physical Education at the University of Belgrade in 1984. In 1982, he spent six months in John Wooden's basketball program at UCLA. He coached the Crvena zvezda youth system for a decade and won several junior national championships.

Sedlaček coached at the FIBA Academy in Pula from 1987 to 1990. In 1988, Sedlaček was promoted as an assistant coach for Crvena zvezda, under head coach Zoran Slavnić. In 1991, he left the Zvezda following a head coach changes. Then he joined Srem. After one season, in 1992, he rejoined Crvena zvezda, now under Vladislav Lučić, as an assistant coach and won a YUBA League title for the 1992–93 season. In 1993, Sedlaček moved to Sweden due to the sanctions against Yugoslavia where he coached Alvik for two seasons. In 1995, he returned to Yugoslavia becoming the head coach of then emerging Hemofarm. Briefly in 1999, he was also an assistant coach for Partizan under Vladislav Lučić. Between 2003 and 2007, Sedlaček was a youth system coordinator for Crvena zvezda.

Sedlaček was a director of Basketball Without Borders camps for Europe (2001–2013) and the Americas (2005–2007), assistant coach of the World Select Team at the Nike Hoop Summit (1998–2018), and director of Nike Euro Camp (1997–1999). He has been a FIBA instructor since 1989, and has conducted over 50 clinics worldwide in that role. Between 2003 and 2019, he was an international scout for NBA teams Memphis Grizzlies and Philadelphia 76ers.

When in Belgrade, Sedlaček frequently appears as a pundit for basketball broadcasts at the Radio Television of Serbia.

== Career achievements ==
As assistant coach

- YUBA League champion: 1 (with Crvena zvezda: 1992–93)
- FR Yugoslav Cup winner: 1 (with Partizan: 1998–99)
