= Ivo Petović =

Montenegrin basketball coach and player

Personal information
- Born: 26 September 1963 (age 63) Kotor, SR Montenegro, SFR Yugoslavia
- Listed height: 6 ft 10 in (2.08 m)

Career information
- NBA draft: 1985: undrafted
- Playing career: 1981–1999
- Position: Power forward / center
- Number: 12
- Coaching career: 2000–present

Career history
- 1981–1983: Budućnost
- 1983–1990: Crvena zvezda
- 1990–1991: AEK Athens

Career highlights
- Slovak League champion; Tunisian Cup winner
Medals
Men's basketball
Representing Yugoslavia
European Championship for Juniors
Silver medal – second place	1982 Bulgaria	Junior team

Ivo Petović (Montenegrin: Иво Петовић; born 26 September 1963) is a Montenegrin professional basketball coach and former player.

== Early life ==
Petović was born in 1963 to a Montenegrin Croat family from Muo at the Bay of Kotor.

== Professional career ==
During his playing days, Petović played for domestic teams Budućnost and Crvena zvezda, and the Greek team AEK Athens. Afterward, he played in Luxembourg, Sweden, Portugal, Slovakia, Russia, Tunisia, Macedonia, Switzerland, and Romania. He retired as a player in 1999.

== National team career ==
Petović was a member of the Yugoslavia cadet team at the 1981 European Championship for Cadets in Greece. Over seven tournament games, he averaged 6.7 points per game.

Petović was a member of the Yugoslavia junior (under-18) team that won the silver medal at the 1982 European Championship for Juniors in Bulgaria. Over six tournament games, he averaged 5.2 points per game. He also was a member of the Junior (under-19) national team at the 1983 World Championship for Juniors in Palma de Mallorca, Spain. Over eight tournament games, he averaged 7 points per game.

== Coaching career ==
In 2000, Petović established KK Stars, a youth academy based in his hometown, where he coaches youth.

== See also ==
- List of KK Crvena zvezda players with 100 games played
