= Nemanja Petrović (basketball) =

Serbian basketball player

Personal information
- Born: July 1973 Belgrade, SFR Yugoslavia
- Died: 19 June 2008 (aged 34) Belgrade, Serbia
- Listed height: 2.08 m (6 ft 10 in)

Career information
- High school: North Penn High School (Lansdale, Pennsylvania)
- College: Maryland (1992–1993); Saint Joseph's (1993–1997)
- NBA draft: 1997: undrafted
- Playing career: 1990–1991
- Position: Center
- Number: 8, 15

Career history
- 1990–1991: Crvena zvezda

Career highlights
- 2× Atlantic 10 All-Academic Team (1996, 1997); Harry Merrill Sportsmanship Award (1997)

Nemanja Petrović (Serbian Cyrillic: Немања Петровић; July 1973 – 19 June 2008) was a Serbian professional basketball player. He played college basketball for the Maryland Terrapins and the Saint Joseph's Hawks.

== High school and college career ==
Petrović came to the United States in 1990 and completed his scholastic career at North Penn High School. He began his collegiate career at the Maryland Terrapins in 1992 but transferred to the Saint Joseph's Hawks in 1993.

Petrović played in 18 games in his first season with the Hawks in 1994–95 and was the recipient of the team's Academic Award. He was hindered by a back injury his junior season but earned Atlantic 10 All-Academic Team honors. As a senior, Petrović started 31 games, averaging 6.9 points and 5.2 rebounds for the squad that reached the 1997 NCAA Division I Sweet 16 after winning the 1997 Atlantic 10 tournament. In the 1996–97 season, Petrović was a GTE/CoSIDA Academic All-District selection, an A-10 All-Academic honoree, and was the recipient of the Harry Merrill Sportsmanship Award from the Philadelphia Big 5.

== Playing career ==
Petrović started to play basketball for the Crvena zvezda's youth in Belgrade. He was promoted to the Crvena zvezda senior team by head coach Zoran Slavnić. In their 1990–91 season, Petrović averaged 1.7 points per game over 9 Yugoslav League games. Also, he averaged 3.4 points per game over 5 Cup Winners' Cup games.

== Personal life ==
Petrović was born in Belgrade, SR Serbia, SFR Yugoslavia, to Rada and Golub Petrović. He had a brother Darko.

Petrović earned his bachelor's degree in finance from the Saint Joseph's University in 1997.

== Death ==
After being hospitalized with an illness in early June 2008, Petrović suffered from what eventually became a viral infection affecting his lungs and heart.
