= Dušan Stević (basketball) =

Serbian basketball player

Personal information
- Born: 22 January 1971 (age 55) Benghazi, Libya
- Listed height: 2.08 m (6 ft 10 in)

Career information
- College: Kirkwood (1990–1991); Oklahoma City (1991–1993); Armstrong State (1993–1995)
- NBA draft: 1995: undrafted
- Playing career: 1989–2009
- Position: Power forward / center
- Number: 7, 14

Career history
- 1989–1990, 1995–1996: Crvena zvezda
- 1996–1997: Hemofarm
- 1997–1998: Krka
- 1998–1999: Hopsi Polzela
- 1999–2002: Lugano Tigers
- 2003: Paris Basket Racing
- 2003: Nantes
- 2003–2004: Erdemirspor
- 2004: Anibal Zahle
- 2005–2006: APOEL
- 2006: Al Riyadi Club Beirut
- 2008: Al-Hilal Riyadh
- 2008–2009: Heyat Shahrekord

Career highlights
- Swiss Cup MVP (2001)

Dušan Stević (Serbian Cyrillic: Душан Стевић; born 22 January 1971) is a Serbian former professional basketball player.

== College career ==
Stević played college basketball at Kirkwood Community College, Oklahoma City, and Armstrong State.

== Professional career ==
A power forward and center, Stević played for Crvena zvezda, Hemofarm, Krka, Hopsi Polzela, Lugano Tigers, Paris Basket Racing, Nantes, Erdemirspor, Anibal Zahle, APOEL, Al Riyadi Club Beirut, Al-Hilal Riyadh, and Heyat Shahrekord. He retired as a player with Shahrekord in 2009.

== Career achievements ==
- Arab Club Championship champion: 1 (with Al Riyadi Club Beirut: 2005–06)
- Swiss Basketball League champion: 3 (with Lugano Tigers: 1999–00, 2000–01, 2001–02)
- Lebanese Basketball League champion: 1 (with Al Riyadi Club Beirut: 2005–06)
- Swiss Cup winner: 1 (with Lugano Tigers: 2000–01)
- Lebanese Cup winner: 1 (with Al Riyadi Club Beirut: 2005–06)
