= Zoran Radović =

Serbian basketball player

Personal information
- Born: February 17, 1961 (age 65) Belgrade, PR Serbia, FPR Yugoslavia
- Listed height: 1.91 m (6 ft 3 in)

Career information
- College: Wichita State (1980–1981)
- NBA draft: 1982: undrafted
- Playing career: 1978–1995
- Position: Point guard

Career history
- 1978–1980: OKK Beograd
- 1981–1990: Crvena Zvezda
- 1990–1992: Alba Berlin
- 1992–1993: OKK Beograd
- 1993–1994: Pavia
- 1994–1995: OKK Beograd
Medals
Men's basketball
Representing Yugoslavia
World Championship
| Bronze medal – third place | 1982 Colombia | National team |
| Bronze medal – third place | 1986 Spain | National team |
Eurobasket
| Bronze medal – third place | 1987 Greece | National team |
| Gold medal – first place | 1989 Yugoslavia | National team |
Universiade
| Bronze medal – third place | 1981 Bucharest | Univ. team |
| Gold medal – first place | 1987 Zagreb | Univ. team |

Zoran Radović (born February 17, 1961, in Belgrade, PR Serbia, FPR Yugoslavia) is a retired Serbian basketball player and current FIBA administrator.

== Early career and college in the U.S. ==
Known for tenacious defensive skills, Radović started playing basketball at OKK Belgrade where he went through all age groups within the club's youth system. Among the various coaches Radović played for at OKK Belgrade, Vlade Đurović would go on to a significant coaching career.

In 1980, Radović moved to the United States to play college basketball at Wichita State University where his single season in the NCAA Division I with the Shockers was very successful. Arriving to Wichita together with compatriot Žarko Đurišić, Radović joined the squad featuring future NBA players Cliff Levingston, Antoine Carr, and Ozell Jones as the sixth seeded Wichita State team came within one game of making it to the Final Four, losing the Midwest regional final to first regional seed Louisiana State University.

== Professional career ==
After his NCAA adventure, Radović came back home, signing with Red Star Belgrade where he spent 9 seasons (1981–1990) and grew into a dependable point guard as well as a defensive stalwart on the Yugoslav national team. In addition to a suffocating and aggressive defensive style, going after offensive rebounds became the staple of his game — a practice he picked up while playing college ball and introduced to the Yugoslav League where guards at the time rarely engaged in such forays on offense. During his career at Red Star Radović played in four Yugoslavian playoff finals in 1984, 1985, 1987 and 1990, one Yugoslavian cup final in 1990, and one European Korac cup final in 1984.

In 1990, Radović moved to Berlin, spending two seasons at the developing German club Alba Berlin where he played in two finals of the German league playoff versus Bayer Leverkusen. His 49 points in one game still stands as a record of the most points scored in one game in Alba Berlin history.

In 1992, Radović came home to Belgrade again and played for the team where he started his career, OKK Belgrade and with the team he won Yugoslavian Cup in a memorable game vs Partizan in 1993.

For the 1993-1994 season Radović played in Pavia, Italy and finished out his career in the 1994-1995 season with the club where he started it, OKK Belgrade.

== National team career ==
Radović started playing with the junior national teams of Yugoslavia at the 1977 Balkan Junior Championship, where the team won a gold medal. He repeated the success in 1978, by winning the gold again at the same event. As a junior player, he also won the Albert Schweitzer Tournament in 1979, and played at the 1979 FIBA Under-19 World Championship, where Yugoslavia finished in fourth place. He also played at the 1981 World University Games.

With the senior Yugoslav national team, Radović's played at two FIBA World Cups, three EuroBaskets, and two Balkan Championships. He missed the 1988 Summer Olympics due to injury, and the 1992 Summer Olympics due to the sanctions against Yugoslavia, that were imposed by the United Nations. In total, he played in 168 official games for Yugoslavia, which places him among the top 30 players in the number of appearances in the history of Yugoslavian national team basketball.

During his national team career, Radović was coached by Bogdan Tanjević, Ranko Žeravica, Krešimir Ćosić, and Dušan Ivković, with all of them being instrumental in the success of Yugoslav basketball.

== See also ==
- List of KK Crvena zvezda players with 100 games played
