= Dragoljub Vidačić =

Serbian basketball player and coach

Personal information
- Born: December 26, 1970 (age 55) Trebinje, SR Bosnia-Herzegovina, SFR Yugoslavia
- Listed height: 1.89 m (6 ft 2 in)

Career information
- NBA draft: 1992: undrafted
- Playing career: 1989–2006
- Position: Point guard
- Number: 4
- Coaching career: 2008–present

Career history

Playing
- 1989–1991: Varda
- 1991–1992: Infos RTM Beograd
- 1992–1995: Crvena zvezda
- 1995–1997: Partizan
- 1997: İstanbul Teknik Üniversitesi
- 1997–1998: Rabotnički
- 1998–1999: Crvena zvezda
- 1999–2003: Hemofarm
- 2003: Makedonikos
- 2003–2004: Lavovi 063
- 2004–2005: NIS Vojvodina
- 2005–2006: Cherkasy Monkeys

Coaching
- 2008–2009: Crvena zvezda Juniors
- 2010–2012: Varda Višegrad
- 2012–2014: Bosna
- 2014–2016: Leotar
- 2017–2018: Spartak Subotica

Career highlights
- As player: 4× YUBA League champion (1993, 1994, 1996, 1997); Macedonian League champion (1998); Macedonian Cup winner (1998)

Dragoljub "Ljuba" Vidačić (born December 26, 1970) is a Serbian basketball coach and former player.

== Early life ==
Born to a father from Trebinje and mother from Gornji Milanovac, Vidačić was raised in Višegrad with three older brothers.

== Coaching career ==
Vidačić started his career as coach of Crvena zvezda Juniors in 2008–09, in 2010 he was named as head coach of KK Varda Višegrad from Višegrad and from 2012 to 2014 he was coach of KK Bosna.
