= Srđan Dabić =

Serbian businessman and basketball player

- Born: 20 July 1962 (age 64); Belgrade, Serbia, Yugoslavia
- Occupations: business manager; basketball player; basketball executive
- Employer: Lukoil Serbia
- Basketball career

Personal information
- Listed height: 1.84 m (6 ft 0 in)

Career information
- NBA draft: 1984: undrafted
- Playing career: 1978–1993
- Position: Point guard
- Number: 4

Career history
- 1978–1981: Crvena zvezda
- 1981–: Radnički Beograd
- –1987: Šibenka
- 1987–1991: Crvena zvezda
- 1991–1993: Levski Totel

Career highlights
- Bulgarian League champion (1993); Bulgarian Cup winner (1993)
Medals
Men's basketball
Representing Yugoslavia
European Championship for Juniors
Silver medal – second place	1980 Yugoslavia	Team
European Championship for Cadets
Gold medal – first place	1979 Syria	Team

Srđan Dabić (Serbian Cyrillic: Срђан Дабић; born 20 July 1962) is a Serbian business manager and former professional basketball player.

== Playing career ==
A point guard, Dabić played 13 seasons in the Yugoslav Federal League from 1978 to 1991. During that time, he played for Crvena zvezda on two occasions, Radnički Belgrade, and Šibenka. In 1991, he signed for a Sofia-based team Levski Totel of the Bulgarian National League.

== National team career ==
Dabić was a member of the Yugoslavia cadet team that won the gold medal at the 1979 European Championship for Cadets in Damascus, Syria. Over seven tournament games, he averaged 10.6 points per game.

Dabić was a member of the Yugoslavia junior team that won the silver medal at the 1980 European Championship for Juniors in Celje, Slovenia, Yugoslavia. Over seven tournament games, he averaged 10.9 points per game.

== Business career ==
In July 2003, Dabić was elected as a board member for the Crvena zvezda Basketball Club.

Dabić was a director of Lukoil Serbia, a Serbian branch of Russian multinational energy corporation Lukoil. In 2003, Dabić represented Lukoil in the privatization of a Serbian state gas company Beopetrol.

Reportedly, Dabić was a business partner of Siniša Mali, a former Mayor of Belgrade. According to OCCRP, Dabić's Bulgaria-based company Akladi sold 24 apartments to Mali in Bulgaria.

== See also ==
- List of KK Crvena zvezda players with 100 games played
