= Slobodan Kaličanin =

Serbian basketball player

Personal information
- Born: 27 April 1969 (age 57) Belgrade, SR Serbia, SFR Yugoslavia
- Listed height: 2.11 m (6 ft 11 in)
- Listed weight: 112 kg (247 lb)

Career information
- NBA draft: 1991: undrafted
- Playing career: 1988–2004
- Position: Power forward
- Number: 11, 8

Career history
- 1988–1990: Crvena zvezda
- 1990–1991: IMT
- 1991–1994: Crvena zvezda
- 1994–1995: Bobanik
- Ibon Nikšić
- 1996–1997: Rogaška Donat MG
- 1997–1998: IDE Trading Rotterdam
- 1998–1999: Genève-Versiox
- 1999–2000: SSV Ulm 1846
- 2001–2002: Elektra Šoštanj
- 2002–2003: Nová Huť Ostrava
- 2003–2004: Zastava Kragujevac
Medals
Men's basketball
Representing Yugoslavia
European Championship for Juniors
Gold medal – first place	1988 Yugoslavia	U20 Team

Slobodan Kaličanin (Serbian Cyrillic: Слободан Каличанин; born 27 April 1969) is a Serbian former professional basketball player.

== Playing career ==
Kaličanin started his basketball career playing with the youth teams of Crvena zvezda. On start of the 1988–89 season he was promoted to the first team. With the Zvezda he won two YUBA League titles (1993 and 1994). Also, he played for Rogaška Donat MG and Elektra Šoštanj (Premier A Slovenian League), the IDE Trading Rotterdam (Dutch League), Genève-Versiox (Swiss League), SSV Ulm 1846 (Basketball Bundesliga) and Nová Huť Ostrava (National League of the Czech Republic).

== National team career ==
Kaličanin was a member of the Yugoslavia national junior team that won the gold medal at the 1988 European Championship for Juniors in Titov Vrbas, Yugoslavia. Over three tournament games, he averaged 5.3 points per game.

== Career achievements ==
- Yugoslav League champion: 2 (with Crvena zvezda: 1992–93, 1993–94)
- Yugoslav Super Cup winner: 1 (with Crvena zvezda: 1993)
