= Slobodan Nikolić (basketball) =

Serbian basketball player and coach

Personal information
- Born: 14 June 1959 (age 67) Zemun, PR Serbia, FPR Yugoslavia
- Listed height: 1.94 m (6 ft 4 in)

Career information
- NBA draft: 1981: undrafted
- Playing career: 1975–1995
- Position: Shooting guard
- Number: 6
- Coaching career: 1995–present

Career history

Playing
- 1975–1987: Crvena zvezda
- 1987–1989: Vojvodina
- 1989–1991: Crvena zvezda
- 1991–1993: OKK Beograd
- 1993–1994: Plama Pleven
- 1994–1995: Radnički Kragujevac

Coaching
- 1996–1999: OKK Beograd
- 1999–2002: Opava (assistant)
- 2002–2003: Opava
- 2003–2004: Lukoil Academic
- 2004–2005: Radnički Zastava
- 2005–2006: Spartak Primorye
- 2006–2007: OKK Beograd
- 2007–2008: Borac Banja Luka
- 2008–2010: Synthesia Pardubice
- 2010–2013: Energia Rovinari
- 2016–2017: Napredak Aleksinac
- 2017: BASK
- 2018: Konstantin

Career highlights
- As player: Bulgarian League champion (1995); Yugoslav Cup winner (1993); As head coach: Czech Republic League champion (2003); Bulgarian League champion (2004); Bulgarian Cup winner (2004); Czech Republic Coach of the Year (2003)
Medals
Men's basketball
Representing Yugoslavia
European Championship for Juniors
Bronze medal – third place	1978 Italy	Team

Slobodan Nikolić (Serbian Cyrillic: Слободан Николић; born June 14, 1959) is a Serbian basketball coach and former player.

== Playing career ==
Nikolić played for the Crvena zvezda of the Yugoslav First League from 1975 to 1987 and from 1989 to 1991. He holds the Clubs records for the most seasons played (14) and the most games played (429). He also played for the Vojvodina and the OKK Beograd as well as for Bulgarian team Plama Pleven. He retired as a player with Radnički Kragujevac in 1995.

== Coaching career ==
Nikolić coached teams from Russia (Spartak Primorye), Bulgaria (Lukoil Academic), the Czech Republic (Opava, Synthesia Pardubice), Romania (Energia Rovinari) as well as OKK Beograd, Radnički Zastava and Borac Banja Luka.

== Personal life ==
He is the father of a Serbian basketball player Stefan Nikolić (born 1987).

== See also ==
- KK Crvena zvezda accomplishments and records
- List of KK Crvena zvezda players with 100 games played
