= Zoran Jovanović (basketball) =

Serbian basketball player

Personal information
- Born: May 25, 1965 (age 61) Belgrade, SR Serbia, SFR Yugoslavia
- Listed height: 2.12 m (6 ft 11 in)

Career information
- College: LSU (1984–1987)
- Playing career: 1981–2000
- Position: Center
- Number: 9

Career history
- 1981–1983: OKK Beograd
- 1987–1993: Crvena zvezda
- 1993–1994: CB Zaragoza
- 1994–1995: Rabotnički
- 1995–1997: OKK Beograd
- 1997–1998: Budućnost Podgorica
- 1998: Vojvodina
- 1998–1999: BKK Radnički
- 1999–2000: Enpol Pogon
Medals
Basketball
Representing Yugoslavia
FIBA World Cup
Gold medal – first place	1990 Argentina	Team
FIBA EuroBasket
Gold medal – first place	1991 Greece	Team
Goodwill Games
Gold medal – first place	1990 Seattle
European Championship for Juniors
Silver medal – second place	1982 Bulgaria	Team

Zoran Jovanović (Serbian Cyrillic: Зоран Јовановић; born May 25, 1965) is a Serbian former professional basketball player who last played for Enpol Pogon.

== See also ==
- List of European basketball players in the United States
