= Mlađan Šilobad =

Serbian basketball player and executive

Mlađan Šilobad Млађан Шилобад
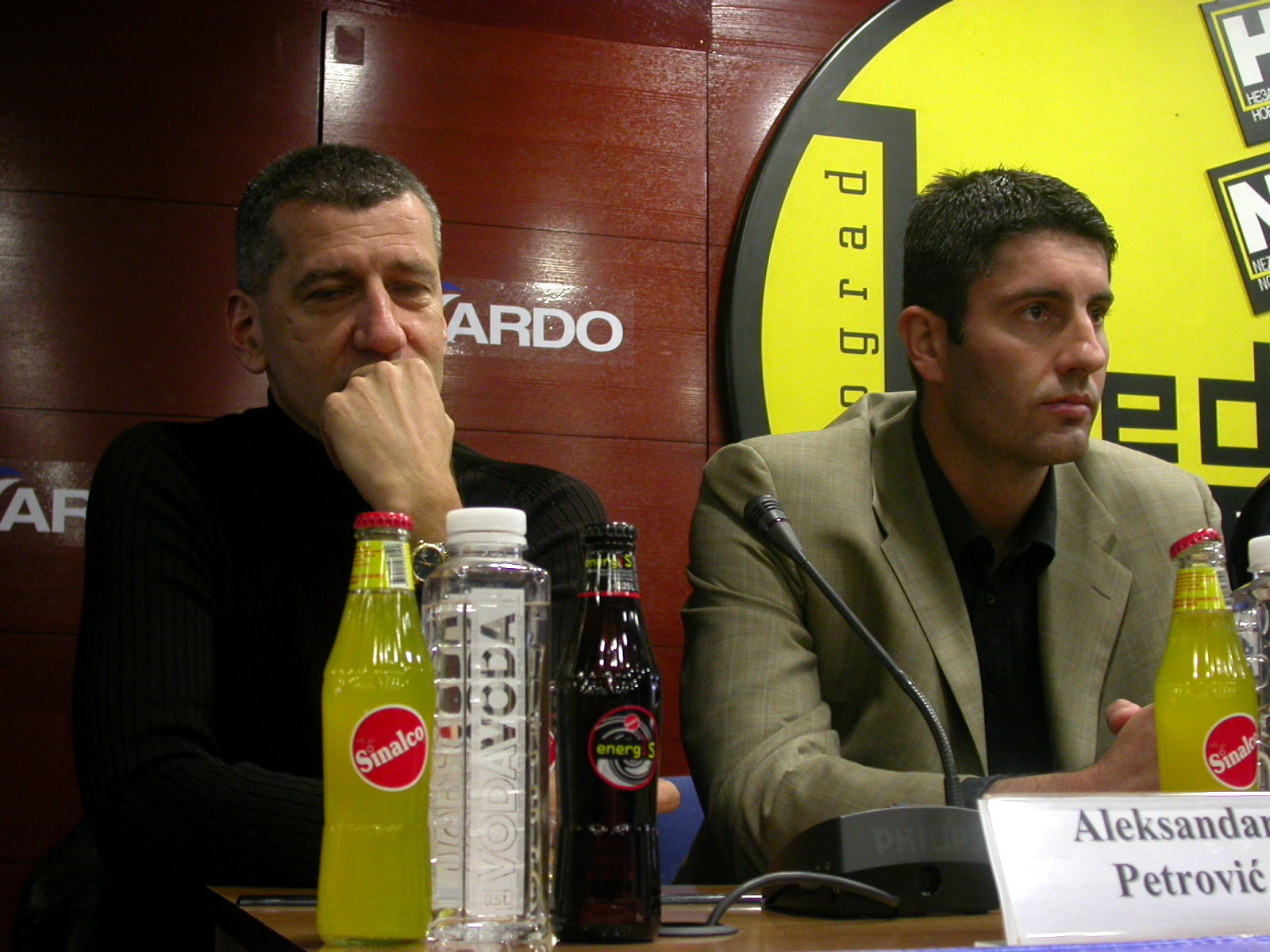
- Šilobad (right) in April 2006.

Partizan Belgrade
- Title: Executive director
- League: Serbian SuperLeague; ABA League; EuroLeague

Personal information
- Born: 6 July 1971 (age 55) Sombor, SR Serbia, SFR Yugoslavia
- Listed height: 2.08 m (6 ft 10 in)

Career information
- NBA draft: 1993: undrafted
- Playing career: 1989–2005
- Position: Center

Career history
- 1989–1991: Crvena zvezda
- 1991–1995: Partizan
- 1995–1997: FMP Železnik
- 1997–1998: Beobanka
- 1998–1999: Maccabi Haifa
- 1999: Lietuvos rytas
- 1999: Oyak Renault
- 2000–2001: Achilleas Nicosia
- 2000: Polonia Warszawa
- 2000–2001: Tapiolan Honka
- 2001–2002: Anwil Włocławek
- 2002–2003: Crvena zvezda
- 2003–2004: Partizan
- 2004–2005: Khimik Yuzhny

Career highlights
- EuroLeague champion (1992); 3× YUBA League champion (1992, 1995, 2004); 4× Yugoslav Cup winner (1992, 1994, 1995, 1997)

Mlađan Šilobad (Serbian Cyrillic: Млађан Шилобад; born 6 July 1971) is a Serbian basketball executive and former player. He is currently serving as the executive director of the Partizan.
