= Dragan Tarlać =

Serbian-Greek basketball player

Dragan Tarlać Драган Тарлаћ
Personal information
- Born: May 9, 1973 (age 53) Novi Sad, SR Serbia, SFR Yugoslavia
- Listed height: 2.11 m (6 ft 11 in)
- Listed weight: 122 kg (269 lb)

Career information
- NBA draft: 1995: 2nd round, 31st overall pick
- Drafted by: Chicago Bulls
- Playing career: 1990–2004
- Position: Center
- Number: 12, 21, 14

Career history
- 1990–1992: Crvena zvezda
- 1992–2000: Olympiacos
- 2000–2001: Chicago Bulls
- 2001–2003: Real Madrid
- 2003–2004: CSKA Moscow

Career highlights
- EuroLeague champion (1997); 3× FIBA EuroStar (1996, 1998, 1999); 5× Greek League champion (1993–1997); 2× Greek Cup winner (1994, 1997); 2× Greek League All-Star (1997, 1998); Triple Crown winner (1997); Russian Championship champion (2004)
- Stats at NBA.com
- Stats at Basketball Reference
Medals
Representing FR Yugoslavia
FIBA EuroBasket
Bronze medal – third place	1999 France	FR Yugoslavia
Gold medal – first place	2001 Turkey	FR Yugoslavia

Dragan Tarlać (Serbian Cyrillic: Драган Тарлаћ, born May 9, 1973) is a retired Serbian professional basketball player. He also holds Greek citizenship. Standing at 2.11 m (6 ft 11 in), he played as a center.

== Professional career ==
=== Europe ===
After starting his senior pro career with his hometown club KK Vojvodina, he transferred to Crvena zvezda from Belgrade. He stayed there for two seasons, which was enough for Olympiacos to notice his talent and offer him a move to Piraeus.

With Olympiacos, he won 5 Greek League championships (1992–93, 1993–94, 1994–95, 1995–96, 1996–97), 2 Greek Cups (1993–94, 1996–97) the 1996-97 EuroLeague championship, and the Triple Crown (1996–97). He was one of the best centers that has ever played for Olympiacos.

=== NBA ===
Tarlać was selected by the NBA club the Chicago Bulls in the 1995 NBA draft. He finally left Greece to go play in the NBA in the summer of 2000, when he took off for the United States to play with the Chicago Bulls. His career in the NBA was not particularly successful, and he returned to Europe the following off-season, after winning the FIBA EuroBasket 2001 with the senior Yugoslavian national team.

=== Back to Europe ===
After leaving the NBA, and returning to Europe, Tarlać then spent his next two seasons with the Spanish League club Real Madrid, before finishing up his career with the Russian League club CSKA Moscow.

== National team career ==
It was with Olympiacos, that Tarlać made a name for himself, earning a call up to the senior FR Yugoslavia national squad (Serbia-Montenegro). For a while, there was a controversy over his national team status, because he took Greek nationality (under the name Dragan Konstantinidis) like many other Serbian players of the time did in the 1990s.

The issue was finally straightened out, and he was allowed to compete for the senior Serbo-Montenegrin national basketball team at the FIBA EuroBasket 1999 in France, along with his fellow countrymen Peja Stojaković and Milan Gurović, who were also in the same situation, having also taken Greek citizenship. His team won the bronze medal at the tournament. He also won the gold medal at the FIBA EuroBasket 2001 with his national team.

== NBA career statistics ==
Legend
GP	Games played	GS	Games started	MPG	Minutes per game
FG%	Field goal percentage	3P%	3-point field goal percentage	FT%	Free throw percentage
RPG	Rebounds per game	APG	Assists per game	SPG	Steals per game
BPG	Blocks per game	PPG	Points per game	**Bold**	Career high

=== Regular season ===
Year	Team	GP	GS	MPG	FG%	3P%	FT%	RPG	APG	SPG	BPG	PPG
2000–01	Chicago	43	12	13.9	.394	.000	.758	2.8	.7	.2	.4	2.4
Career		43	12	13.9	.394	.000	.758	2.8	.7	.2	.4	2.4

== Personal life ==
His son, Luka (born 2002) is a basketball player, also. Luka was a member of the Serbia national under-16 team at the 2018 FIBA Europe Under-16 Championship.

== See also ==
- List of Serbian NBA players
