= Boban Janković =

Serbian basketball player (1963–2006)

Slobodan "Boban" Janković
Personal information
- Born: December 15, 1963 Lučani, SR Serbia, SFR Yugoslavia
- Died: June 28, 2006 (aged 42) Rhodes, Greece
- Listed height: 6 ft 7.5 in (2.02 m)
- Listed weight: 230 lb (104 kg)

Career information
- Playing career: 1980–1993
- Position: Small forward
- Number: 8

Career history
- 1980–1990: Crvena Zvezda
- 1990–1991: Vojvodina
- 1991–1992: Crvena zvezda
- 1992–1993: Panionios

Career highlights
- Yugoslav League Top Scorer (1992); No. 8 retired by Panionios
Medals
Representing Yugoslavia
Men's basketball
Balkan Championship
Gold medal – first place	1985 Romania

Slobodan "Boban" Janković (Serbian Cyrillic: Слободан "Бобан" Јанковић; December 15, 1963 – June 28, 2006) was a Serbian professional basketball player. He played the position of small forward. He was nicknamed "Bomber" and played in 326 games over 12 seasons.

Janković's career ended in April 1993, when he sustained a severe spinal injury after ramming his own head against cement blocks in reaction to a foul call on the court. He never fully recovered from the injury and died from heart failure in 2006.

== Biography ==
Janković was born in Lučani but moved to Belgrade when he was seven years old. His father, Dragoljub, was an athlete. His mother, Radmila, enrolled him in basketball due to his height. He attended "Prva Proleterska" elementary school in Dorćol, where he was scouted by KK Crvena zvezda of the First Federal Basketball League.

In 1980, at age 16, Janković joined KK Crvena zvezda and played his first game on November 29, 1980. He was physically strong but not athletically built and was nicknamed "Guza" (butt). He was known for his long-range shooting accuracy. During the 1983-1984 season, he completed his military service at Prijedor; his team was eliminated during the Radivoj Korać Cup.

He played for the national team of Yugoslavia in the Balkan Athletics Championships in 1984, in which he won a silver medal and in 1985, in which he won a gold medal.

In 1990, he transferred to KK Vojvodina of Novi Sad, also in the First Federal Basketball League, where he played for one season.

In 1992, despite qualifying, he was prevented from participating in the 1992 Summer Olympics due to sanctions resulting from the Bosnian War.

Before the 1992–93 season, he transferred to Panionios B.C., where he scored 30 points in his first exhibition game. He once launched a successful shot from near half court. Jankovic scored 41 points in a 97-85 victory over Dino Radja and the predecessor to Virtus Roma; the next day, the local press referred to him as the "Serbian Larry Bird".

=== Injury ===
On April 28, 1993, eight minutes before the end of a tense crucial playoff game between Panionios B.C. and Panathinaikos B.C. in Nea Smyrni, with the score 56–50, Janković threw the ball into the basket while being guarded by Fragiskos Alvertis. However, the referee denied the basket and called an offensive foul. It was Janković's fifth foul of the game, which meant that he had fouled out.

In reaction to what he believed was a bad call, Janković rammed his head against the cement blocks supporting the backboard. He slumped to the floor in a pool of blood. He was choking and motioned to a teammate to turn him over. He was diagnosed with a fractured neck vertebra, damage to the spinal cord and paralysis from the neck down. Janković later said that he first considered hitting the referee in reaction to the call but decided against it because "it wouldn't end well".

The next day, he underwent surgery at KAT Hospital in Athens and doctors were optimistic that he would regain use of his arms and legs. The operation lasted 3.5 hours and Janković was in a coma for 14 days thereafter. A month later, he got pneumonia for 14 days. Janković spent 4 months in London for treatment.

Panionios retired his number 8 jersey. Several fundraisers and charity games were organized to raise money for Janković.

After the incident, at the direction of FIBA, all backboard supports were covered with a sponge base to prevent another injury.

== Death ==
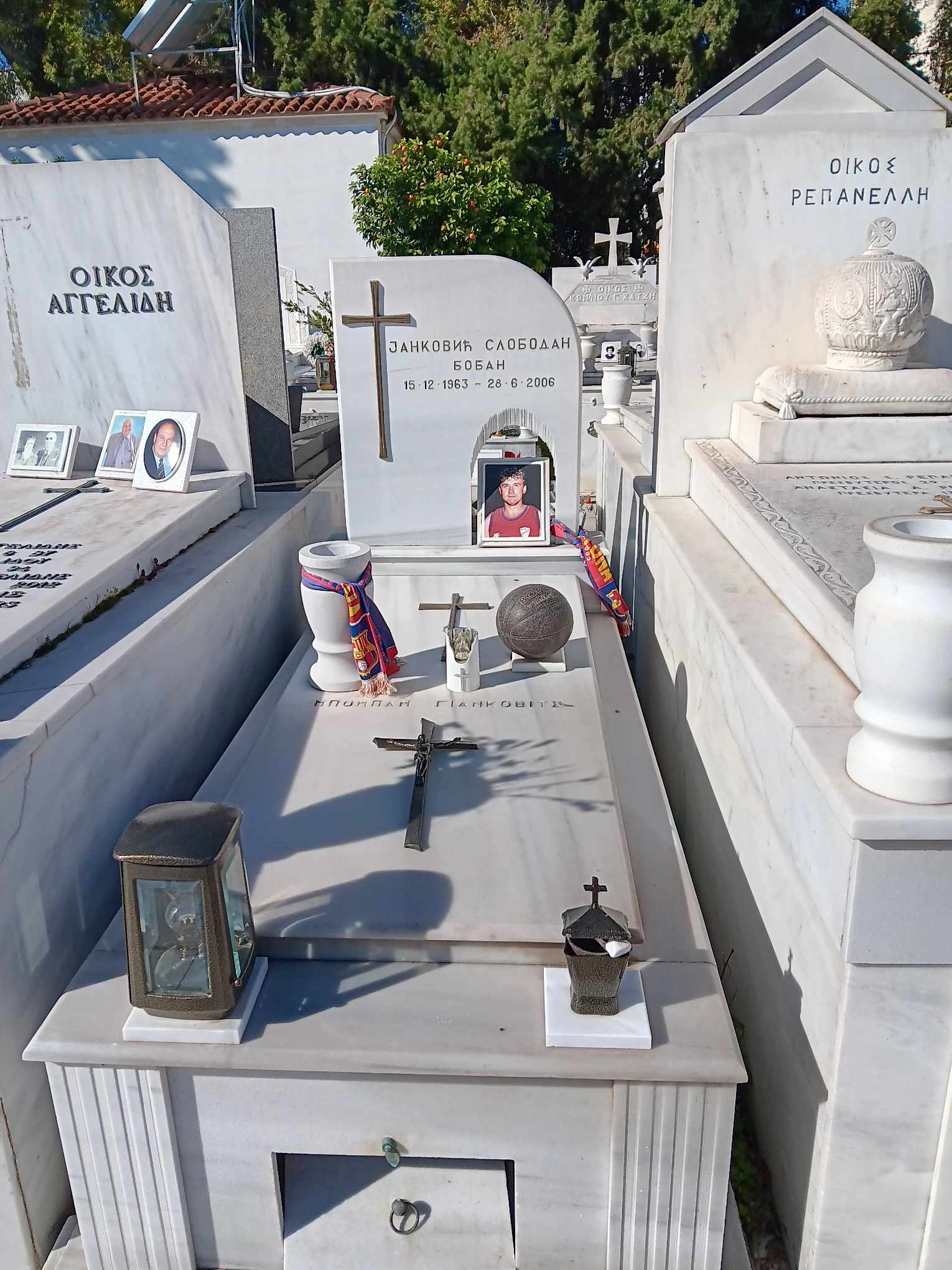
Janković's tombstone at the Nea Smyrni cemetery

Janković used a wheelchair for the final 13 years of his life and gained a considerable amount of weight, which exerted significant stress on his heart. On June 28, 2006, while on a holiday cruise near Rhodes that departed from Piraeus, Janković died of a heart attack and heart failure at the age of 42. His funeral was attended by several thousand people including Dejan Tomašević, Zarko Paspalj, Zeljko Rebraca, Dragan Tarlać, and Vlade Đurović and was paid for by the municipality of Nea Smyrni.

== Personal life ==
Janković was married to Dragana Belojevic Janković. They split in 1997. Their son, Vlado Janković, also played professional basketball until 2026, and lived with his mother in Cyprus after the divorce of his parents.

Janković was 6 ft 8 in (2.03 m) tall.

== See also ==
- KK Crvena zvezda accomplishments and records
- List of KK Crvena zvezda players with 100 games played
- List of Yugoslav First Federal Basketball League annual scoring leaders
