= Aleksandar Trifunović (basketball) =

Serbian basketball player and coach

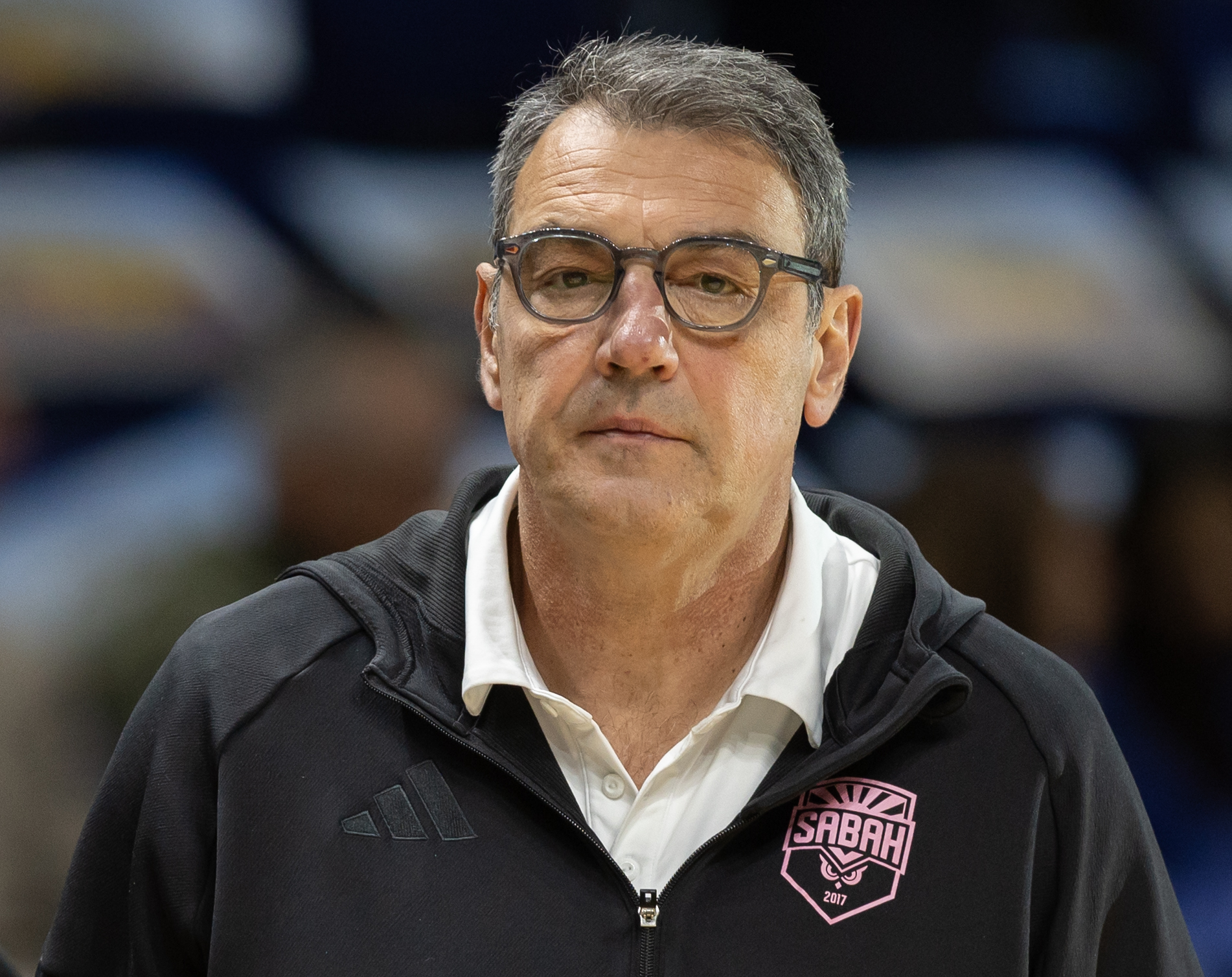
- Trifunović in December 2025

Personal information
- Born: 30 May 1967 (age 59) Belgrade, SR Serbia, Yugoslavia
- Listed height: 201 cm (6 ft 7 in)

Career information
- NBA draft: 1989: undrafted
- Playing career: 1986–2001
- Position: Shooting guard
- Number: 12
- Coaching career: 2002–present

Career history

Playing
- 1986–1988: Crvena zvezda
- 1988–1991: Zadar
- 1991–1997: Crvena zvezda
- 1997–1998: Fribourg
- 1998–2000: Pogoń Ruda Śląska
- 2000–2001: Beopetrol

Coaching
- 2002–2003: Crvena zvezda
- 2003–2004: Crvena zvezda (assistant)
- 2004–2005: Crvena zvezda
- 2006–2007: Lietuvos rytas (assistant)
- 2007-2008: Lietuvos rytas
- 2008–2009: Panionios
- 2009: Spartak Saint Petersburg
- 2009–2010: Crvena zvezda
- 2010–2011: Lietuvos rytas
- 2011–2012: Žalgiris
- 2013–2015: Astana
- 2016–2017: Yeşilgiresun Belediye
- 2017–2018: Pınar Karşıyaka
- 2019: Igokea
- 2020–2021: Khimki (assistant)
- 2022: Dinamo București
- 2025–2026: Sabah BC (assistant)

Career highlights
- As player: 2× YUBA League champion (1993, 1994); As head coach: Lithuanian League champion (2012); Lithuanian Cup winner (2012); 2× Baltic League champion (2007, 2012)

Aleksandar Trifunović (Serbian Cyrillic: Александар Трифуновић; born 30 May 1967) is a Serbian professional basketball coach and former player who was most recently the assistant coach for Sabah BC of the Azerbaijan Basketball League.

== Playing career ==
Trifunović began his pro career with Crvena zvezda before moving to KK Zadar where he played for 3 seasons under head coaches Dragan Šakota, Slavko Trninić, and Krešimir Ćosić. He returned to Crvena zvezda in summer 1991, contributing greatly to the club's two back-to-back league titles.

== Coaching career ==
Trifunović was the head coach of the Serbian League club Crvena zvezda during the 2001–02 season. Trifunović was the head coach for the Serbian club Crvena zvezda during the 2002–03 season and during the month of December during the 2004-05 season. He firmly established his head coaching career in Lithuania with the Lithuanian League club Lietuvos rytas in the years 2006–2008. Rytas club reached the ULEB Cup finals in the 2006–07 season and the EuroLeague Top 16 stage in the 2007–08 season. He also won the Baltic League championship in 2007 for Rytas. In the 2008 off-season, he became the head coach of the Greek League club Panionios.

In 2009, he became the head coach of the Russian Super League club Spartak Saint Petersburg. He resigned from the club on 10 November 2009. On 27 December 2009, Trifa signed a new one-and-a-half-year contract with Crvena zvezda. In October 2010, Trifunovic returned to Lietuvos rytas. Despite a slow start, he led the team to the Euroleague Top16. However, a loss in the LKF cup and finishing only 3rd in the Baltic League led to Trifunovic parting ways with Rytas in April 2011.

After starting the 2011–12 season without a team, Trifunović shocked everyone when he became the head coach of BC Žalgiris, the archrival of Lietuvos Rytas. Trifunovic led BC Žalgiris to the LKF cup, and also helped win the Baltic League and the Lithuanian League championships, beating Lietuvos rytas in the finals.

In December 2013, Trifunović became the head coach of BC Astana. In February 2015, he was released by the club. On 9 February 2016, Trifunović was named the head coach of Yeşilgiresun Belediye of the Turkish Basketball Super League. On 11 August 2016 he re-signed with Yeşilgiresun for one more season.

On 20 June 2017, Trifunović was named as the head coach of Pınar Karşıyaka. In June 2019, he signed for Bosnian club Igokea. He left Igokea in October 2019 due to health issues.

On 26 July 2022, Dinamo București signed Trifunović as their new head coach.

On August 22, 2025, he signed with Sabah BC of the Azerbaijan Basketball League as an assistant coach.

== National team coaching career ==
In May 2022, the Azerbaijan Basketball Federation hired Trifunović as the new head coach for the Azerbaijan men's national basketball team.

== Personal life ==
His son Uroš (born 2000) is a basketball player, currently playing for Maccabi.

On 16 September 2019, Trifunović suffered a stroke.

== See also ==
- List of KK Crvena zvezda head coaches
