= Nebojša Ilić (basketball) =

Serbian basketball player and executive

Nebojša Ilić Небојша Илић
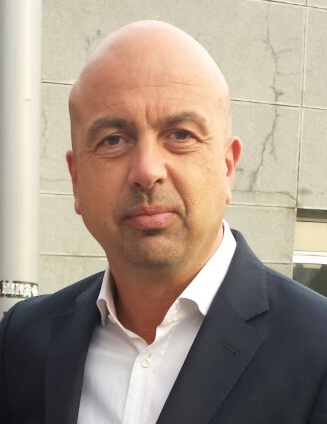
- Nebojša Ilić in 2015

Crvena zvezda Meridianbet
- Title: Team Manager
- League: Basketball League of Serbia; Adriatic League

Personal information
- Born: 26 February 1968 (age 58) Belgrade, SR Serbia, SFR Yugoslavia
- Listed height: 1.98 m (6 ft 6 in)

Career information
- NBA draft: 1990: undrafted
- Playing career: 1985–1997
- Position: Shooting guard / small forward
- Number: 5, 7

Career history
- 1985–1993: Crvena zvezda
- 1993–1995: Cáceres
- 1995–1997: Crvena zvezda

Career highlights
- YUBA League champion (1993); YUBA League MVP (1993)
Medals
Men's basketball
Representing Yugoslavia
European Championship for Cadets
Gold medal – first place	1985 Bulgaria	Team
European Championship for Juniors
Gold medal – first place	1986 Austria	Team
Junior World Championship
Gold medal – first place	1987 Italy	Team

Nebojša "Neša" Ilić (Serbian Cyrillic: Небојша "Неша" Илић; born 26 February 1968) is a Serbian basketball executive and former player. He is currently serving as the team manager for Crvena zvezda and the Serbia national basketball team.

== Playing career ==
=== Crvena zvezda (1985–1993) ===
Ilić spent most of his professional career in his hometown-based team Crvena zvezda. Ilić holds the Yugoslav Association League record for points in one game. On November 21, 1992, in a game against Vojvodina, he scored 71 points and set the league record.

=== Cáceres (1993–1995) ===
Ilić had a stint with Spanish team Cáceres. He played two Liga ACB seasons there. The most important achievement there was the semifinals of the 1994–95 FIBA Korać Cup.

=== Return to Crvena zvezda (1995–1997) ===
After the 1996–97 season, Ilić retired from professional basketball. In his ten seasons with Zvezda over two stints, he played 304 games for the club (tied with Zoran Slavnić) and scored 4,732 points.

== National team career ==
=== Youth ===
Ilić was a member of the gold medal-winning Yugoslav cadet team at the 1985 European Championship for Cadets in Ruse, Bulgaria. Over seven tournament games as the team's leading scorer, he averaged 20.4 points per game.

One year later, Ilić made the Yugoslavia national under-18 team at the 1986 FIBA Europe Under-18 Championship in Austria. Playing on the gold-winning team, over seven tournament games, he averaged the team-leading 15.0 points per game.

Ilić was a member of the Yugoslavia national under-19 team that won the gold medal at the 1987 FIBA Under-19 World Championship in Bormio, Italy. Over six tournament games as the team's leading scorer, he averaged 15.3 points per game.

In each of the three tournaments, Svetislav Pešić was the head coach, while Vlade Divac, Toni Kukoč, Radenko Dobraš, and Slaviša Koprivica were his teammates.

== Basketball executive career ==
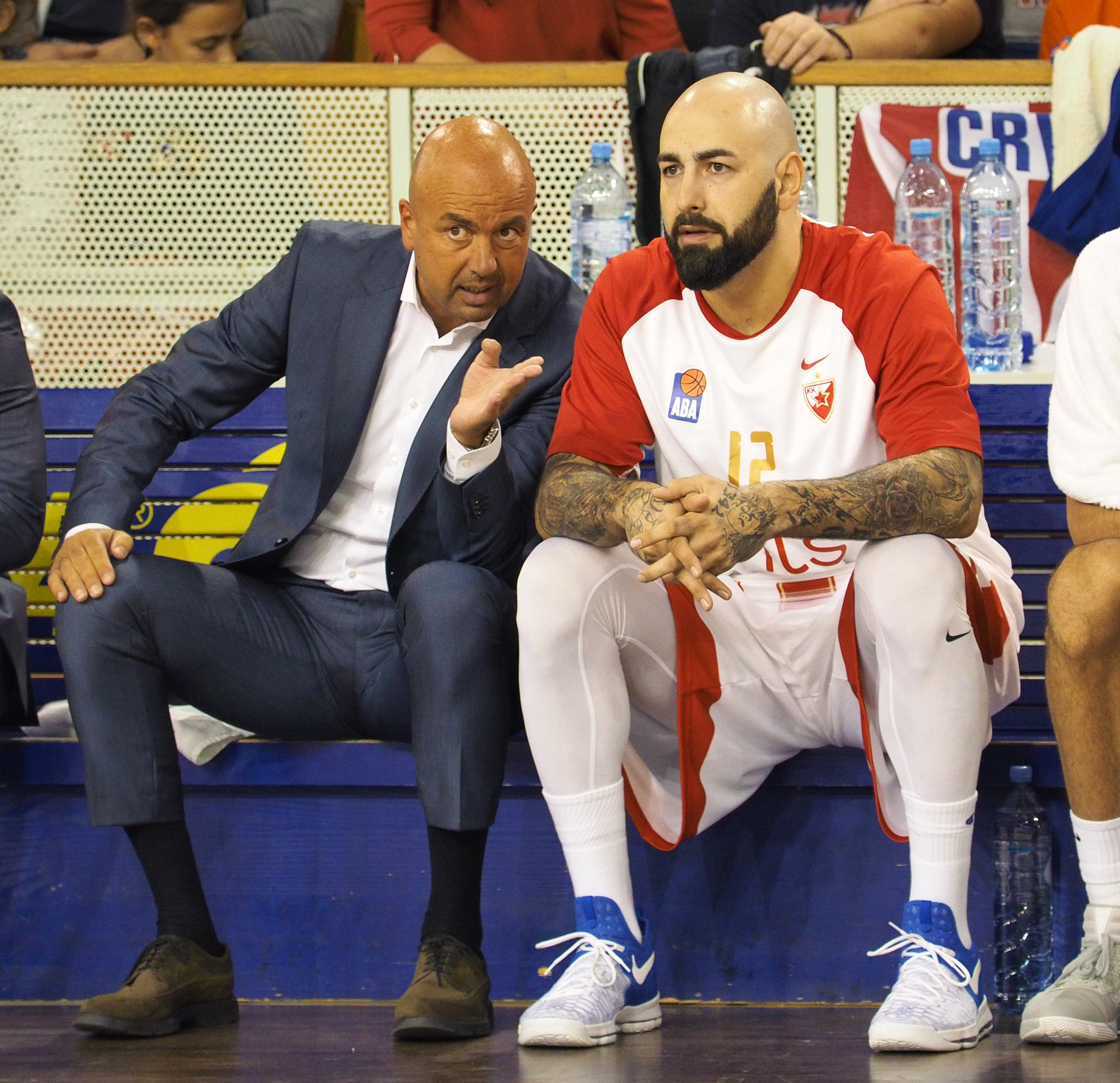
Crvena zvezda team manager Ilić talking to Zvezda's player Pero Antić in October 2017.

=== Crvena zvezda (2001–present) ===
Ilić have been serving as a team manager of Crvena zvezda since 2001. On 19 September 2017 he became a sports director of the Zvezda. He left the sports director office in October 2019.

As a staff manager of the Zvezda, Ilić won as follows:

- 7 Serbian League championships (2014–15, 2015–16, 2016–17, 2017–18, 2018–19, 2020–21, 2021–22),
- 8 National Cup tournaments (2004, 2006, 2013, 2014, 2015, 2017, 2021, 2022).
- 6 Adriatic League championships (2015, 2016, 2017, 2019, 2021, and 2022), and
- 1 Adriatic Supercup tournament (2018).

=== Serbia national team (2010–present) ===
In 2010, Ilić joined the Serbia national basketball team's staff as the team manager. Since then, he worked with four head coaches; Dušan Ivković, Aleksandar Đorđević, Igor Kokoškov, and current Svetislav Pešić.

Ilić won four silver medals with the national team: 2014 FIBA Basketball World Cup, 2016 Summer Olympics, EuroBasket 2017 and 2023 FIBA Basketball World Cup.

== See also ==
- KK Crvena zvezda accomplishments and records
- List of KK Crvena zvezda players with 100 games played
- List of Liga ACB annual free throw percentage leaders

Sporting positions
New creation	Team manager of KK Crvena zvezda 2001–present	Incumbent
Preceded by Mirko Pavlović	Sports director of KK Crvena zvezda 2017–2019	Succeeded by Žarko Čabarkapa
Preceded by Miroslav Berić	Team manager of the Serbia men's national basketball team 2010–present	Incumbent
