= Saša Obradović =

Serbian basketball coach and former player

Saša Obradović Саша Обрадовић
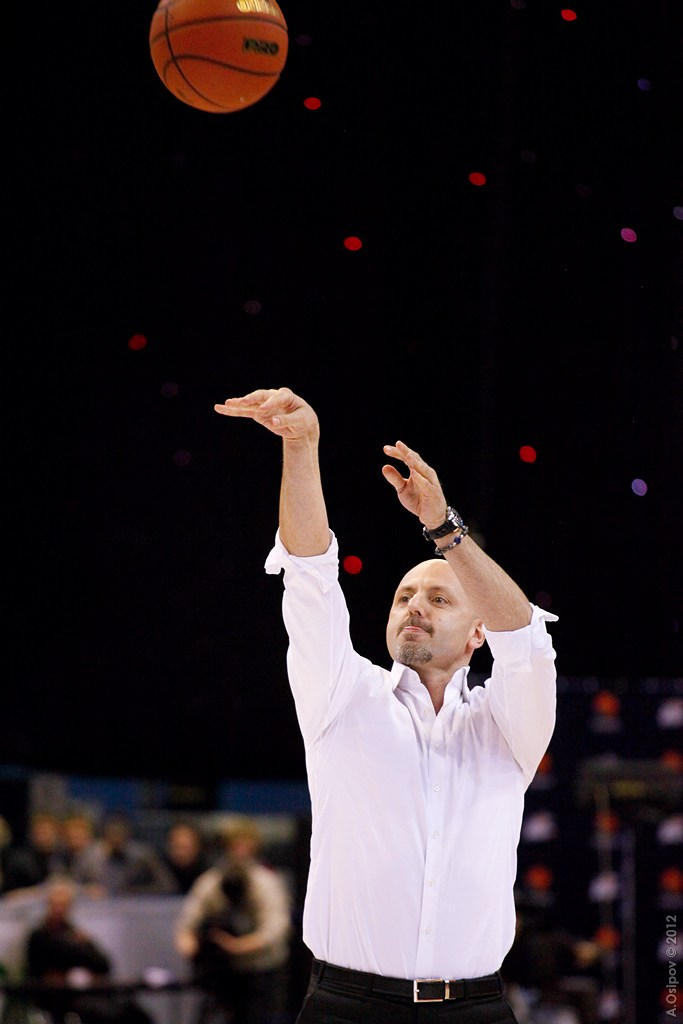
- Obradović with Donetsk in 2012.

Hapoel Jerusalem
- Title: Head coach
- League: Ligat HaAl; EuroCup

Personal information
- Born: 29 January 1969 (age 57) Belgrade, SR Serbia, SFR Yugoslavia
- Listed height: 6 ft 5.75 in (1.97 m)
- Listed weight: 94 kg (207 lb)

Career information
- NBA draft: 1991: undrafted
- Playing career: 1987–2005
- Position: Point guard / shooting guard
- Number: 6, 4, 5
- Coaching career: 2005–present

Career history

Playing
- 1987–1993: Crvena zvezda
- 1987–1988: → Grocka
- 1993–1994: Limoges
- 1994: Crvena zvezda
- 1994–1997: Alba Berlin
- 1997–1999: Virtus Roma
- 1999–2000: Crvena zvezda
- 2000–2001: Budućnost
- 2001–2005: RheinEnergie Köln

Coaching
- 2005–2008: RheinEnergie Köln
- 2008–2009: Kyiv
- 2009: Turów Zgorzelec
- 2010–2012: Donetsk
- 2012–2016: Alba Berlin
- 2016–2018: Lokomotiv Kuban
- 2019–2020: AS Monaco
- 2020: Crvena zvezda
- 2021–2024: AS Monaco
- 2025–2026: Crvena zvezda
- 2026–present: Hapoel Jerusalem

Career highlights
- As player: FIBA European Selection (1995); FIBA EuroStar (1996); FIBA Korać Cup champion (1995); 3× Yugoslav League champion (1993, 1994, 2001); Yugoslav Cup winner (2001); Bundesliga champion (1997); 3× German Cup winner (1997, 2004, 2005); As head coach: Bundesliga champion (2006); 4× German Cup winner (2007, 2013, 2014, 2016); Bundesliga Coach of the Year (2015); FIBA EuroChallenge All-Star Game (2006); Russian Cup winner (2018); 2x LNB Pro A champion (2023, 2024); French Cup winner (2023); Ukrainian Super League champion (2012); EuroCup Coach of the Year (2018)
Medals
Men's basketball
Representing (Federal Republic of Yugoslavia) FR Yugoslavia
Olympic Games
Silver medal – second place	1996 Atlanta	Team
FIBA World Cup
Gold medal – first place	1998 Greece	Team
FIBA EuroBasket
Gold medal – first place	2001 Turkey	Team
Bronze medal – third place	1999 France	Team
Gold medal – first place	1997 Spain	Team
Gold medal – first place	1995 Greece	Team

Saša Obradović (Anglicized: Sasha Obradovic; Serbian Cyrillic: Саша Обрадовић, pronounced [sâʃa obrǎːdoʋit͜ɕ]; born 29 January 1969) is a Serbian professional basketball coach and former player. He is currently the head coach for Hapoel Jerusalem of the Israeli Israeli Basketball Premier League and the EuroCup.

Standing at 1.97 m (6 ft 5 1/2 in), he played in the guard position for Crvena zvezda, Limoges, Alba Berlin, Virtus Roma, Budućnost, and RheinEnergie Köln. During his playing career, he won FIBA Korać Cup in 1995, three YUBA League championships and a Yugoslav Cup, as well as German League title and three German Cup tournaments.

A Yugoslav international, (Note: Obradović represented then FR Yugoslavia (later Serbia and Montenegro) internationally.) Obradović won three FIBA EuroBasket gold medals (1995, 1997, 2001), and a bronze medal in 1999. He also won the gold medal at the 1998 FIBA World Championship and the Olympic silver medal at the 1996 Olympics.

Obradović finished his playing career in 2005 with RheinEnergie Köln. The following season, he became their head coach and won the German League in his rookie season. In the 2011–12 season, he coached Donetsk to their first-ever Ukrainian Super League title. Thereafter, he coached Alba Berlin for four seasons, winning three German Cup tournaments. In 2018 Obradović won the Russian Cup with Lokomotiv Kuban, earning the EuroCup Coach of the Year award.

== Playing career ==
As a professional basketball player, Obradović played for Crvena zvezda, Limoges, Alba Berlin, Virtus Roma, Budućnost Podgorica and RheinEnergie Köln, until his retirement in 2005.

In April 2001, during his time with Budućnost, Obradović got into a fistfight with teammate Milenko Topić, during a practice session, and got suspended by the club. They soon parted ways.

He is cited by former teammate, Marcin Gortat, as his mentor and a figure that helped develop Gortat as a player and person.

== National team career ==
After the lifting of sanctions against FR Yugoslavia, the national team was given the opportunity to qualify for the 1995 FIBA European Championship in Greece through the Additional qualifying round in Sofia, Bulgaria. Obradović had a key role in a 93–87 overtime win over Bulgaria when he scored the team-high 16 points and helped the team to qualify for Championship. Afterwards, he was a member of the national team led by head coach Dušan Ivković that won the gold medal at the 1995 Championship. The team finished the tournament undefeated at 9–0. Over nine tournament games, Obradović averaged 6.3 points, one rebound, and 1.9 assists per game.

Obradović was a member of the national team led by head coach Željko Obradović that won the silver medal at the 1996 Olympics in Atlanta, United States. Yugoslavia lost to the United States in the gold medal game. He recorded his tournament-high with 18 points in a 91–68 win over Australia in the Preliminary round game 2. Over eight tournament games, Obradović averaged 6.2 points, one rebound, and 1.9 assists per game.

Obradović won his second gold medal at the 1997 FIBA European Championship in Spain. Over nine tournament games, he averaged 5.1 points and 2.3 assists per game. The team went on to win their second straight gold medal, defeating Italy in the final game. In the next year, Obradović was a member of the Yugoslavia team that won the gold medal at the FIBA World Championship in Greece. He scored his tournament-high with 18 points, making 4 threes out of 4, in 19 minutes in a 99–54 win over Japan. Over nine tournament games, he averaged 9 points, 1.1 rebounds, and 1.3 assists per game.

Obradović won the bronze medal at the 1999 FIBA European Championship in France averaging 9.2 points, 1.2 rebounds, and 1.8 assists per game over five tournament games. He missed three all three games in the Knockout stage due to injury. In the next year, Obradović played at his second Olympics. Over seven Olympic tournament games in Australia, he averaged 6.6 points, 1.6 rebounds, and 1.7 assists per game.

Obradović was a member of the Yugoslavia team led by head coach Svetislav Pešić that won the gold medal at the 2001 FIBA European Championship in Turkey. It was his third gold medal at European Championships (nowadays known as EuroBasket). The team finished the tournament undefeated at 6–0, defeating Turkey in the final game. Over six tournament games, he averaged 4.3 points, 1.7 assists, and 1.7 steals per game. After the tournament he announced his retirement from international basketball at 32.

== Coaching career ==
Immediately after his retirement as a basketball player, Obradović began his coaching career and was appointed the head coach for RheinEnergie Köln, where he served until 2008. He also coached at Kyiv, Turów Zgorzelec and Donetsk. After coaching those teams, Obradović joined Alba Berlin in 2012.

On 23 May 2016, it was announced that Obradović would leave Alba.

In November 2016, Obradović signed to be the head coach for the Russian club Lokomotiv Kuban of the VTB United League. He left Lokomotiv Kuban on 4 November 2018.

In February 2019, Obradović was named the head coach for AS Monaco of the LNB Pro A. In June 2020, he parted ways with Monaco.

Obradović got his first taste of the NBA through the Summer League coaching stints with the Brooklyn Nets, the Atlanta Hawks and the San Antonio Spurs.

On 10 June 2020, Crvena zvezda named Obradović as the new head coach. After having only 5 wins in 16 Euroleague games, he parted ways with Crvena Zvezda on 24 December 2020.

On December 13, 2021, he has signed with AS Monaco of the French LNB Pro A.

On October 8, 2025 he returned to Crvena zvezda and signed a two-year contract with the club

On December 12, 2025, as it was heard Obradović was threatened with a firing by the Crvena Zvezda’s management, if the eternal derby in Euroleague was not sold to the rival. Obradović led Crvena Zvezda to a 20-18 record and secured a play-in spot.

Torture by the club management to Saša didn’t stopped there. After a series of continued threats Crvena Zvezda was eliminated from the ABA League semi-finals by Partizan. On May 21, 2026, Obradović resigned from the Crvena Zvezda head coach position.

On June 13, 2026, he has signed with Hapoel Jerusalem of Israeli Basketball Premier League.

== Career awards and achievements ==
As player:

- 3× Yugoslav League Champion: 1993, 1994, 2001
- FIBA Korać Cup Champion: 1995
- FIBA European Selection: 1995
- FIBA EuroStar: 1996
- German League Champion: 1997
- 3× German Cup Winner: 1997, 2004, 2005
- Yugoslav Cup Winner: 2001

As head coach:

- National Championships:
  - German League Champion: 2006
  - Ukrainian Super League Champion: 2012
  - 2x LNB Pro A champion: 2023, 2024
- National Cups:
  - 4× German Cup Winner: 2007, 2013, 2014, 2016
  - Russian Cup Winner: 2018
  - French Cup Winner: 2023
- Individual:
  - FIBA EuroChallenge All-Star Game: 2006
  - German League Coach of the Year: 2015
  - EuroCup Basketball Coach of the Year: 2018

== See also ==
- List of Olympic medalists in basketball
- List of KK Crvena zvezda players with 100 games played
