= Lega Basket Serie A statistical leaders =

Lega Basket Serie A statistical leaders are the season by season stats leaders of the top-tier level professional basketball league in Italy, the LBA (first division), and the all-time stats leaders of both the LBA and the Serie A2 (2nd division).

== Top scorers by season ==
In basketball, points are the sum of the score accumulated through free throws or field goals. The LBA's scoring title is awarded to the player with the highest points per game average in a given regular season. Prior to the 1987–88 season, the league's Top Scorer was the player that scored the most total points in the league during the season. Since the 1987–88 season, the league's Top Scorer is the player with the highest scoring average per game during the season.

=== By total points scored ===
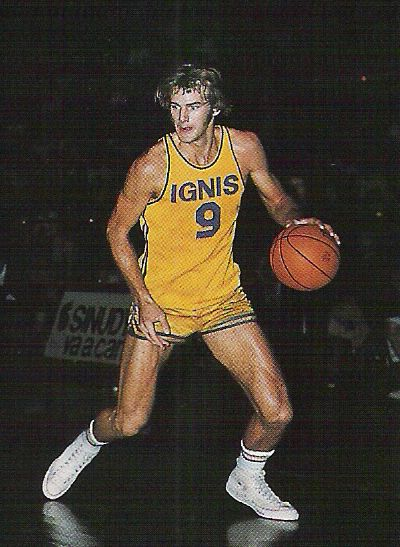
Bob Morse, 6× Italian League scoring champion.

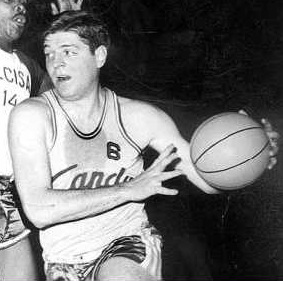
Gianfranco Lombardi, 2× Italian League scoring champion.

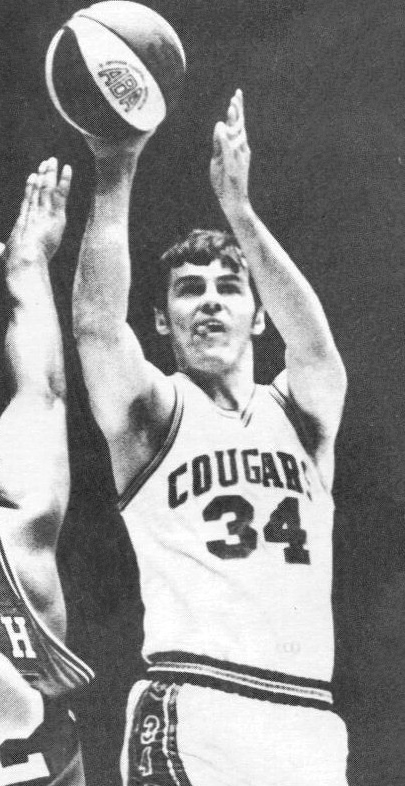
Doug Moe, 1966 Italian League scoring champion.

Starting with the 1974–75 season, stats accumulated in the league's playoffs were also counted. Through the 1987–88 season, the Top Scorer of the league was the player that scored the most total points. Starting with the 1989–90 season, the Top Scorer of the league was the player with the highest points per game scoring average.

Top scorers by total points scored (1948–49 to 1986–87)
Season	Player (league's top scorer)	Club	Total points scored
1948–49	(Italy) Agostino Miliani	San Giusto Trieste	238
1949–50	(Italy) Romeo Romanutti	Borletti Milano	378
1950–51	(Italy) Sergio Stefanini	Borletti Milano	473
1951–52	(Italy) Sergio Stefanini (2×)	Borletti Milano	366
1952–53	(Italy) Sergio Stefanini (3×)	Borletti Milano	416
1953–54	(Italy) Sergio Stefanini (4×)	Borletti Milano	517
1954–55	(Italy) Tonino Zorzi	Ignis Varese	527
1955–56	(Italy) Romeo Romanutti (2×)	Borletti Milano	496
1956–57	(United States) Tony Vlastelica	Benelli Pesaro	546
1957–58	(United States) Tony Vlastelica (2×)	Oransoda Cantù	479
1958–59	(United States) Al Inniss	Lanco Pesaro	508
1959–60	(Italy) Nino Cescutti	Lanco Pesaro	531
1960–61	(Italy) Paolo Vittori	Simmenthal Milano	509
1961–62	(Italy) Nino Cescutti (2×)	Algor Pesaro	529
1962–63	(Italy) Andrea Toso	Pallacanestro Treviso	628
1963–64	(Italy) Gianfranco Lombardi	Knorr Bologna	594
1964–65	(Italy) Paolo Vittori (2×)	Simmenthal Milano	562
1965–66	(United States) Doug Moe	Petrarca Padova	674
1966–67	(Italy) Gianfranco Lombardi (2×)	Candy Bologna	552
1967–68	(Socialist Federal Republic of Yugoslavia) Trajko Rajković	Fargas Livorno	521
1968–69	(Socialist Federal Republic of Yugoslavia) Radivoj Korać	Boario Padova	581
1969–70	(United States) Elnardo Webster	Splügen Brau Gorizia	593
1970–71	(United States) Gary Schull	Eldorado Bologna	540
1971–72	(United States) John Fultz	Norda Bologna	655
1972–73	(United States) Bob Morse	Ignis Varese	824
1973–74	(United States) Bob Morse (2×)	Ignis Varese	753
1974–75	(United States) Bob Morse (3×)	Ignis Varese	1,336
1975–76	(United States) Chuck Jura	Mobilquattro Milano	1,198
1976–77	(United States) Chuck Jura (2×)	Xerox Milano	1,052
1977–78	(United States) Chuck Jura (3×)	Xerox Milano	997
1978–79	(United States) Bob Morse (4×)	Emerson Varese	885
1979–80	(United States) Bob Morse (5×)	Emerson Varese	964
1980–81	(United States) Bob Morse (6×)	Turisanda Varese	980
1981–82	(United States) Zam Fredrick	Sinudyne Bologna	988
1982–83	(United States) Kevin Magee	Cagiva Varese	887
1983–84	(Brazil) Oscar Schmidt	Indesit Caserta	955
1984–85	(Brazil) Oscar Schmidt (2×)	Indesit Caserta	1,140
1985–86	(Brazil) Oscar Schmidt (3×)	Mobilgirgi Caserta	1,226
1986–87	(Brazil) Oscar Schmidt (4×)	Mobilgirgi Caserta	1,316
1987–88	(Socialist Federal Republic of Yugoslavia) Dražen Dalipagić	Hitachi Venezia	1,417

=== By scoring average ===
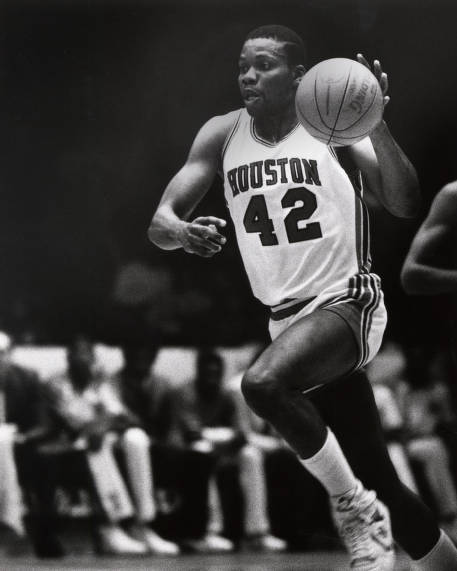
Michael Young, 1991 Italian League scoring champion.

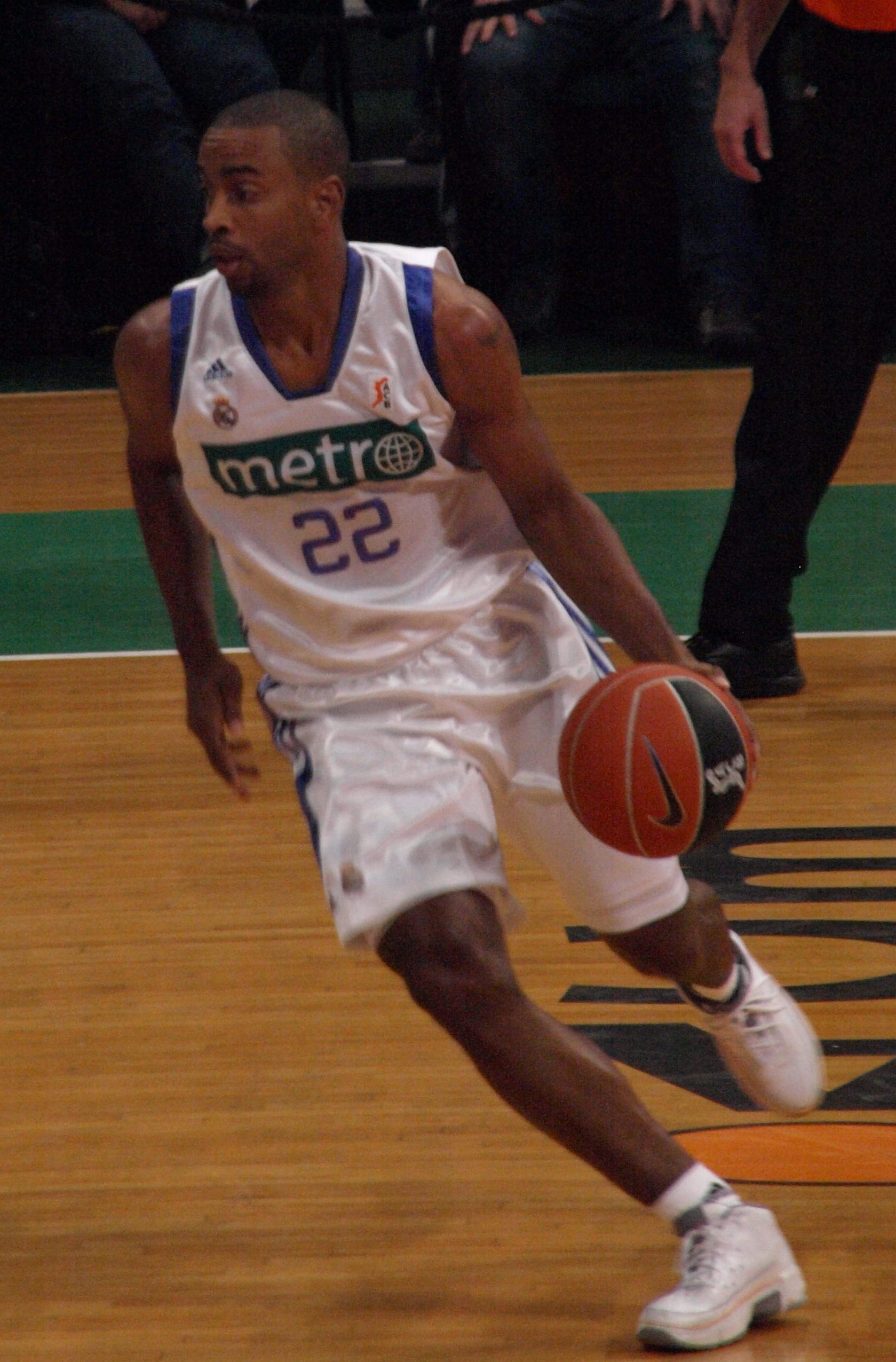
Lou Bullock, 2002 Italian League scoring champion.

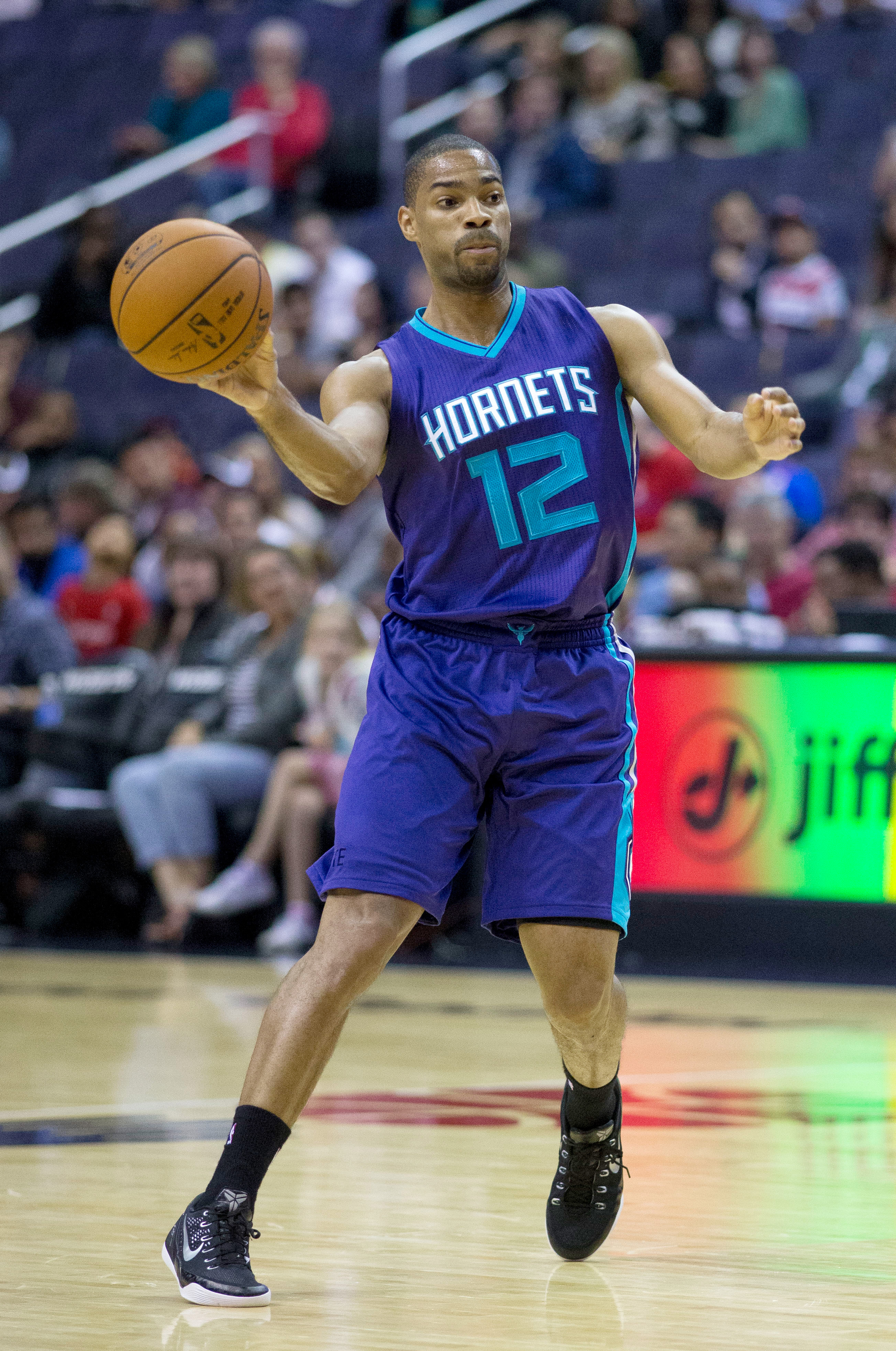
Gary Neal, 2010 Italian League scoring champion.

Top scorers by scoring average (1987–88 to present)
Season	Player (league's top scorer)	Club	Scoring average
1988–89	(Brazil) Oscar Schmidt (5×)	Snaidero Caserta	35.6
1989–90	(Brazil) Oscar Schmidt (6×)	Phonola Caserta	32.7
1990–91	(United States) Michael Young	Panasonic Reggio Calabria	34.0
1991–92	(Brazil) Oscar Schmidt (7×)	Branca Pavia	37.7
1992–93	(Italy) Larry Middleton	Marr Rimini	26.0
1993–94	(Italy) Mario Boni	Bialetti Montecatini	30.5
1994–95	(Croatia) Arijan Komazec	Cagiva Varese	33.7
1995–96	(Italy) Carlton Myers	Teamsystem Bologna	26.9
1996–97	(United States) Steve Burtt Sr.	Genertel Trieste	34.1
1997–98	(United States) Mike Mitchell	Cfm Reggio Emilia	24.1
1998–99	(Italy) Vincenzo Esposito	Termal Imola	24.5
1999–00	(Italy) Vincenzo Esposito (2×)	Lineltex Imola	30.9
2000–01	(Italy) Vincenzo Esposito (3×)	Lineltex Imola	28.0
2001–02	(United States) Lou Bullock	Adecco Milano	24.9
2002–03	(Slovenia) Boris Gorenc	Metis Varese	22.4
2003–04	(United States) Charlie Bell	Mabo Livorno	25.5
2004–05	(United States) Drew Nicholas	Solidago Livorno	22.8
2005–06	(United States) Lynn Greer	Carpisa Napoli	23.5
2006–07	(Puerto Rico) Rick Apodaca	Legea Scafati	19.8
2007–08	(United States) Clay Tucker	Siviglia Wear Teramo	21.0
2008–09	(Panama) Michael Hicks	Scavolini Pesaro	18.8
2009–10	(United States) Gary Neal	Benetton Treviso	19.4
2010–11	(United States) James White	Dinamo Sassari	21.0
2011–12	(United States) Andre Smith	Otto Caserta	18.4
2012–13	(United States) Donell Taylor	Trenkwalder Reggio Emilia	19.1
2013–14	(United States) Drake Diener	Banco di Sardegna Sassari	19.4
2014–15	(United States) Tony Mitchell	Dolomiti Energia Trento	20.7
2015–16	(United States) Austin Daye	Consultinvest Pesaro	21.3
2016–17	(United States) Marcus Landry	Germani Basket Brescia	19.6
2017–18	(United States) Jason Rich	Sidigas Avellino	19.3
2018–19	(United States) Frank Gaines	Red October Cantù	20.3
2019–20	(United States) Adrian Banks	New Basket Brindisi	21.2
2020–21	(United States) JaCorey Williams	Aquila Basket Trento	17.8
2021–22	(United States) Marcus Keene	Pallacanestro Varese	18.7
2022–23	(United States) Frank Bartley	Pallacanestro Trieste	19.5
2023–24	(Italy) Nico Mannion	Pallacanestro Varese	20.3
2024–25	(United States) Rob Gray	Scafati Basket	21.1
2025–26	(United States) Jahmi'us Ramsey	Pallacanestro Trieste	19.3

Source: LegaBasket.it STATISTICHE (in Italian).

== Players with most top-scorer awards ==
Player	Awards	Editions
(Brazil) Oscar Schmidt	7	1984-1987, 1989, 1990, 1992
(United States) Bob Morse	6	1973-1975, 1979-1981
(Italy) Sergio Stefanini	4	1951-1954
(United States) Chuck Jura	3	1976-1978
(Italy) Vincenzo Esposito	3	1999-2001
(Italy) Nino Cescutti	2	1960-1962
(Italy) Paolo Vittori	2	1961, 1965
(Italy) Gianfranco Lombardi	2	1964, 1967
(United States) Tony Vlastelica	2	1957, 1958
(Italy) Romeo Romanutti	2	1950, 1956

== All-time scoring leaders (1970–present) ==
The all-time top scoring leaders of games played in the LBA, the Italian top-tier level professional club basketball league, and the Serie A2, which is Italy's second tier competition. Includes points scored since the 1970–71 season, when Lega Basket took over the competitions.

Rank	Player	Points scored	Games played	Scoring average	Years played in the leagues	Clubs
1	(Italy) Antonello Riva	14,397	785	18.3	1977–2002	Cantù, Olimpia Milano, VL Pesaro, Ginnastica Goriziana, NSB Rieti
2.	(Brazil) Oscar Schmidt	13,957	403	34.6	1982–1993	Juvecaserta, Pavia
3.	(Italy) Carlton Myers	11,320	582	19.5	1988–2010	Rimini, VL Pesaro, Fortitudo Bologna, Virtus Roma, Mens Sana Basket
4.	(United States) Chuck Jura	9,870	344	28.7	1972–1985	Milano 1958, Basket Mestre, Alpe Bergamo, Montesacro Roma
5.	(United States) Bob Morse	9,775	352	27.8	1972–1981, 1984–1986	Varese, Reggio Emilia
6.	(Italy) Mario Boni	9,756	470	20.8	1983–2005	Vigevano, Montecatini, Virtus Roma, Roseto Sharks, Teramo Basket, Aurora Basket Jesi
7.	(Italy) Larry Middleton	9,460	527	18.0	1989–2005	Trieste, Basket Rimini, Basket Cervia, Basket Napoli, Mens Sana Basket, VL Pesaro, Basket Avellino
8.	(Italy) Renato Villalta	9,266	558	16.6	1974–1991	Basket Mestre, Virtus Bologna, Basket Treviso
9.	(Italy) Walter Magnifico	9,189	740	12.4	1979–2001	Fortitudo Bologna, VL Pesaro, Virtus Bologna, Virtus Roma
10.	(Italy) Roberto Premier	9,140	633	14.4	1978–1996	Ginnastica Goriziana, Olimpia Milano, Virtus Roma, Basket Modena

== Sources ==
- Almanacco illustrato del basket 1990. Panini, Modena, 1989. (in Italian)
- Almanacco illustrato del basket 2009. Panini, Modena, 2008, p. 211. (in Italian)
