= 1972–73 Serie A (basketball) =

Serie A
- Season: 1972–73
- Duration: 24 October 1972 – 25 April 1973
- Games played: 26
- Teams: 14

Regular season
- Relegated: Gorena Padova; Gamma Varese

Finals
- Champions: Ignis Varese; 6th title
- Runners-up: Simmenthal Milano

Statistical leaders
Points	(United States) Bob Morse	29.8

Records
- Highest scoring: S. Milano 118–106 N. Bologna (31 December 1972)
- Winning streak: 19 games Simmenthal Milano
- Losing streak: 7 games Gamma Varese

The 1972–73 Serie A basketball championship was the 50th season of the Serie A, the highest professional basketball league in Italy.

The regular season ran from 22 October 1972 to 22 April 1973, an expanded league saw fourteen teams play 26 games each. As Ignis Varese and Simmenthal Milano ended joint first with an equal head-to-head record, a single playoff game decided the title for the third year running. Varese won the game, played in Bologna, to reclaim the title from Milano, earning their sixth overall title (and a spot in the European Champions Cup).

== Preseason ==
Perennial powerhouses Simmenthal Milano and Ignis Varese were seen as even-matched overwhelming favourites to fight for the title, which Milano had won the previous season following a title playoff game against Ignis. Aspiring team Forst Cantù, on the back of a good season that had seen them beat Ignis away, were touted as a possible third powerhouse that could join the title fight. At the other end of the spectrum, promoted sides Gamma Varese and Brill Cagliari were the favourites to go back down, with Gorena Padova and Partenope Napoli to possibly join them in the relegation fight.

The most important squad change saw American Bob Morse replace star Mexican Manuel Raga as Ignis' sole foreigner in the league (they were both allowed to play in European competition) with his adaptation or lack of crucial to their title chances. Though they had lost substitute Tony Gennari to Splügen Venezia, the Nikolić coached team had otherwise kept their major Italians such as Dino Meneghin. Simmenthal, coached by Cesare Rubini, trusted their all-action American Art Kenney and their young Italians such as Giulio Iellini and Renzo Bariviera, whilst the form of an ageing Massimo Masini could prove important. The upstarts from Cantù meanwhile, counted on the combination of American center Bob Lienhard with promising Italians Pierluigi Marzorati and Carlo Recalcati, whilst Mobilquattro Milano made an important signing in Chuck Jura.

League regulations called for all clubs to play in arenas holding at least 3,500 spectators but four clubs (Cantù, Padova, Venezia and Saclà Asti) were given exemptions for the season though their arenas fell short of requirements (Asti's arena hosting only 700 for example).

== Regular season ==
The three favourites initially comfortably raced into a shared lead, this changed with Simmenthal's upset in the fifth round to mid-table Splügen Venezia led by American Steve Hawes and Gennari. The Milanese would recover however, decisively downing Cantù 87-76 in the first clash between the three top sides on 10 December, using the same starting five (Kenney, Iellini, Masini, Bariviera and Giuseppe Brumatti) for 40 minutes to stifle their opponents' scoring.

After Ignis also downed Cantù, the title chase reverted to the usual two-horse race between them and Simmenthal, with a clash in Milan on 14 January 1973. The home-side eked out a close 76-72 to go level on points with Ignis. In a game of two halves – with an entertaining first half (42-40) and a scrappy second one – Simmenthal won the game on the back of good performances both in attack and defense from Barivera (23 points), Masini and a diminished Kenney (both 14 points). Ignis, meanwhile, relied too heavily on the selfish Morse – leading the league in scoring – who scored 29 points (on 14 for 23 shooting) but played his teammates ouf of the game.

The next rounds saw the status quo remain, with the most notable event being an Ignis' 25-point victory over Simmenthal, though this time in the European Champions Cup first semi-final in early March. Ignis played modest Brill Cagliari (before last in the league) in between the two semi-finals, with fatigue and lack of focus certainly playing a part in the surprising 75-76 defeat to the Sardinians that saw Simmenthal overtake them and move into first place by two points.

After both beat Cantù anew, the title was to be decided once again by the return match between the powerhouses on 18 April, this time in Varese, with the home-team – unbeaten against Simmenthal at home for nearly eight years – confident of winning. That prediction proved to be correct as the newly crowned European Champions took the game 90-79, helped by two scoring performances by Ivan Bisson (34 points) and Morse (30 points). Simmenthal and Varese traded blows equally during the first two quarters, before Kenney struck Meneghin whilst they were fighting for a ball, leaving him with a bloodied nose that took him off the court for the game. Tensions flared after this incident, with the public raging after both the referees (who left the American unpunished) and Kenney, who dominated Meneghin's replacement Ottorino Flaborea to grab offensive rebounds and push Milano in front. However the same Kenney's departure from the court seven minutes into the second half for five fouls, followed three minutes later by Masini for the same reasons, decisively changed the flow of the game in Varese's favour, they soon took a ten-point lead they would not relinquish.

The last round unsurprisingly saw both win their games to finish on the same points and head-to-head record, once again creating the need for a one-off play-off game to crown the champion (the third such occurrence in as many years).

=== Standings ===
Serie A 1972–73 – Club Locations

Pos	Teams	P	W	L	PF	PA	Champion or relegation
1 ●	Ignis Varese	26	24	2	2411	1761	Title playoff (see below)
2 ●	Simmenthal Milano	26	24	2	2413	1986	Title playoff (see below)
3	Forst Cantù	26	21	5	2364	2009	
4 ●	Mobilquattro Milano	26	12	14	2048	2150	
5 ●	Snaidero Udine	26	12	14	2046	2115	
6 ●	Norda Bologna	26	12	14	2152	2183	
7 ●	Saclà Asti	26	11	15	1989	2044	
8 ●	Splügen Venezia	26	11	15	2031	2068	
9 ●	Partenope Napoli	26	11	15	1999	2227	
10 ●	Alco Bologna	26	10	16	1816	1985	
11 ●	Maxmobili Pesaro	26	10	16	1925	2030	
12 ●	Brill Cagliari	26	10	16	2003	2153	
13	Gorena Padova	26	9	17	1829	2003	Relegation to Serie B
14	Gamma Varese	26	5	21	1872	2184	Relegation to Serie B

Source: Lega Basket

● Ranking by head-to-head record then points differential in case of tie (see record).

=== Individual scoring table ===
Rank	Name	Team	Points	PPG
1.	(United States) Bob Morse	Ignis Varese	819	31.5
2.	(United States) Don Holcomb	Brill Cagliari	709	28.4
3.	(United States) Chuck Jura	Mobilquattro Milano	628	24.1
4.	(United States) Steve Hawes	Splügen Venezia	603	23.2
5.	(Italy) Paolo Gurini	Maxmobili Pesaro	566	21.8
6.	(United States) Gary Schull	Alco Bologna	561	21.6
7.	(United States) John Fultz	Norda Bologna	561	25.5
8.	(United States) Carl Johnson	Gorena Padova	527	21.1
9.	(Italy) Pierluigi Marzorati	Forst Cantù	508	19.5
10.	(United States) David Hall	Snaidero Udine	476	20.7

Source: unofficial statistics compiled by the Giganti del Basket magazine (official statistics started from the 1975–76 season).

== Postseason ==
=== Title playoff ===
The title-deciding playoff game was played in Bologna's Palazzo dello Sport on 25 April 1973 in front of 7,000 people. Simmenthal first took a 10-6 lead on the back of Bariviera's efficient marking of Morse, staying ahead for nearly all the first half before Marino Zanatta put Ignis in front 16 minutes in (30-29). The same Zanatta picked up his fourth foul soon after and his absence in defense saw Simmenthal push in front, taking a 63-54 lead 33 minutes in. However, a minute later Kenney departed after committing his fifth foul, followed two minutes later by Bariviera with the score (68-63) still favouring the Milanese though the loss of two of their forwards put them on the back foot. Ignis took advantage of the height differential and their forwards, Meneghin (playing with a face mask to protect his nose), Morse (top-scorer with 31 points) and Bisson (marked by a 12 cm smaller Brumatti) scored seemingly at will, equalising (68-68) two minutes from the end before racing home to a 74-70 win to claim the title back from Simmenthal.

25 April
21:00

Boxscore

Ignis Varese 74, Simmenthal Milano 70
Pts: Bob Morse 31; Rebs: Dino Meneghin 15; Asts: Ivan Bisson 1	Pts: Renzo Bariviera 16; Rebs: Renzo Bariviera 8 Asts: Giulio Iellini 2

Palazzo dello Sport, Bologna
Attendance: 7,000

== Italian Cup ==
Holders Simmenthal were surprisingly sent crashing out at the quarterfinal stage by Saclà who were joined in the Brescia-based final four by another promoted side, Cagliari, with the other semi-final pitting Varese against Cantù. Saclà and Ignis made it to the final, which was easily won 94-65 by the Italian champions, who added the cup to their domestic, European and Intercontinental titles. As they were already qualified for the 1973–74 European Champions Cup, Asti took their place in the European Cup Winners' Cup.

== Championship-winning squad ==
Ignis Varese 1972–73 Serie A champions

- (Italy) 4 Edoardo Rusconi
- (Italy) 5 Ottorino Flaborea
- (Italy) 6 Franco Bartolucci
- (Italy) 7 Giorgio Chiarini
- (Italy) 8 Marino Zanatta
- (United States) 9 Bob Morse
- (Italy) 10 Aldo Ossola
- (Italy) 11 Dino Meneghin
- (Italy) 12 Paolo Polzot
- (Italy) 13 Massimo Lucarelli
- (Italy) 14 Ivan Bisson
- Coach: (Socialist Federal Republic of Yugoslavia) Aca Nikolić

Source: Lega Basket
