= 1970–71 Serie A (basketball) =

Serie A
- Season: 1970–71
- Duration: 18 October 1970 – 4 April 1971
- Games played: 22
- Teams: 12

Regular season
- Relegated: Libertas Livorno; Cecchi Biella

Finals
- Champions: Ignis Varese; 5th title
- Runners-up: Simmenthal Milano

Statistical leaders
Points	(United States) Gary Schull	24.5

Records
- Highest scoring: S. Milano 138–88 Udine (24 March 1971)
- Winning streak: 18 games Ignis Varese
- Losing streak: 12 games Norda Bologna

The 1970–71 Serie A basketball championship was the 48th season of the Serie A, the highest professional basketball league in Italy.

The regular season ran from 18 October 1970 to 28 March 1971, twelve teams played 22 games each. As both Ignis Varese and Simmenthal Milano were tied first with the same head-to-head record (having only lost once apiece, to each other) a single playoff game decided the title, the third ever played between the two squads (one on-the-court win per side, respectively in 1962 and 1966). Varese won the game played in Rome to earn their third straight championship, fifth overall (and the single spot in the European Champions Cup).

The other end of the league table also saw a tie, with three teams on the same points for two relegation spots, hence playoffs were also played where Libertas Livorno and Cecchi Biella (both newly promoted) were relegated back to the Serie B.

== Preseason ==
Ignis Varese, who had the previous season completed the domestic double (league and Italian Cup) in addition to winning the European Champions Cup (adding the Intercontinental Cup before the season) were seen as the overwhelming favourites. Simmenthal Milano, All'Onestà Milano and on a lesser note Forst Cantù and Splügen Venezia were seen as the likely challengers. All but one club had sponsorship names – widely the major source of revenue for clubs – with Libertas Livorno the involuntary exception.

With only one foreign player allowed per club, nearly all were American, Varese's Mexican international Manuel Raga (considered the best foreigner in the league) and Splügen Venezia's newly arrived Brazilia international Ubiratan were the notable exceptions. Ignis, led by Aca Nikolić, could still count on Raga, Dino Meneghin, Aldo Ossola, Ottorino Flaborea and Paolo Vittori, adding Italian international Ivan Bisson from Snaidero Udine whilst sending Claudio Malagoli and Livio Paschini the other way (American John Fultz was signed only for the European Champions Cup). Simmenthal, coached by Cesare Rubini, had replaced on-off American Jim Tillman with compatriot Arthur Kenney, the retirement of historic player Sandro Riminucci was the only other change. All'Onesta put their trust in the proven quartet of Joe Isaac, Tony Gennari, Enrico Bovone and Marino Zanatta, Forst Cantù had supplemented key players Carlo Recalcati and Alberto De Simone with American newcomer Bob Lienhard whilst an important move saw Dado Lombardi move from Norda Bologna to cross-town rivals Eldorado Bologna for 25 million lira.

== Regular season ==
Both Ignis and Simmenthal raced ahead of the others, so much that by the time they met each other in Varese on 27 December 1970 they were both unbeaten, with only Fides Napoli having provided any serious opposition. The game was already seen as title-deciding, Ignis had the best defence (60,1 points conceded per game to Simmenthal's 63.8) but the Milanese were more prolific in attack (81.8 points per game to Varese's 79.4) and were seen to have a slight edge over the holders. Ultimately, Varese would win a hard-fought if not spectacular game 71-58, Meneghin out-rebounded Massimo Masini to score 16 points while Vittori and Flaborea dominated in attack (the first scoring a game-high 22 points). Though Giorgio Giomo shackled Raga well and Kenney put in a fighting performance (15 points), it was not enough for Simmenthal, not helped by an anonymous performance from Renzo Bariviera (3 points).

When came the time to play the return game in Milan on the 14 March 1971 the situation remained unchanged with both teams having won all their games in between (including in Europe). The game, reportedly played at the highest level, saw a partial repeat of the first leg as an in-form Vittori again top-scored (25 points) whilst Flaborea (18 points) also stepped up when Giomo's good marking on Raga restricted the sharpshooter. However, this time Simmenthal stepped up to the challenge and an extremely combative Kenney dished up 20 points, including two free-throws with only seconds left, whilst Masini added as much, to grab a close 72-71 win. With both squads on the same points and with the same head-to-head record, a playoff game was seen as virtually guaranteed despite there being three rounds left to play as no team could challenge the leaders. It proved to be the case as both squads easily won their final games to preserve the status-quo and make a playoff necessary. Simmenthal even recorded the most points scored in a league game by downing Snaidero Udine 138-88 in the final round on 24 April, four days before other games as Milano were playing the Cup Winners' Cup final. (Note: Milano defeated Spartak Leningrad to win the Cup Winners' Cup but Varese conceded their Champions Cup title to CSKA Moscow). The 138 points record, replacing the 133 Simmenthal themselves had scored the previous season, stayed as league record for decades, it still is a club record as of 2015.

Forst Cantù comfortably beat presumed title-challenger All'Onesta Milano 90-57 in Milan in the second round. They proved to be the surprise squad of the tournament as the emergence of an eighteen-year-old Pierluigi Marzorati at playmaker coupled with good performances from Lienhard and Recalcati led them to third-place, 10 points from the leading duo but themselves 8 points in front of the rest of the pack led by All'Onesta Milano, an Ubiratan-led Splügen Venezia and a workmanlike Fides Napoli.

In the relegation battle, the two promoted squads Cecchi Biella and Libertas Livorno predictably struggled but managed to win the odd game (Biella was greatly helped by American import Rudy Bennett, third-best league scorer with 22.8 points per game). At the same time Norda Bologna spent a large part of the season in free-fall, losing twelve consecutive games until a win over Snaidero Udine during the penultimate round enabled them to join Biella and Livorno on 10 points (from five wins). All three lost their final game, which both Livorno and Biella had to play at a neutral venue (respectively Florence and Borgosesia) due to being penalised for previous crowd behaviour), meaning a three-way playoff series was needed to decide relegation.

=== Standings ===
Serie A 1969–70 – Club Locations

Pos	Teams	P	W	L	PF	PA	Champion or relegation
1 ●	Ignis Varese	22	21	1	1805	1380	Title playoff (see below)
2 ●	Simmenthal Milano	22	21	1	1845	1565	Title playoff (see below)
3	Forst Cantù	22	16	6	1768	1639	
4	All'Onestà Milano	22	12	10	1665	1590	
5	Splugen Venezia	22	11	11	1674	1622	
6	Fides Napoli	22	10	12	1579	1580	
7 ●	Tropicali Boario Pesaro	22	9	13	1549	1608	
8 ●	Snaidero Udine	22	9	13	1655	1831	
9	Eldorado Bologna	22	8	14	1598	1668	
10 ●	Libertas Livorno	22	5	17	1339	1561	Relegation playoffs (see below)
11 ●	Norda Bologna	22	5	17	1425	1660	Relegation playoffs (see below)
12 ●	Cecchi Biella	22	5	17	1544	1742	Relegation playoffs (see below)

Source: Lega Basket

● Ranking by head-to-head record in case of tie (see record).

=== Individual scoring table ===
Rank	Name	Team	Points	PPG
1.	(United States) Gary Schull	Eldorado Bologna	540	24.5
2.	(United States) Joe Allen	Snaidero Udine	524	23.8
3.	(United States) Rudy Bennett	Cecchi Biella	501	22.8
4.	(Mexico) Manuel Raga	Ignis Varese	499	22.7
5.	(Italy) Massimo Masini	Simmenthal Milano	477	21.7
6.	(Brazil) Ubiratan	Splügen Venezia	416	19.8
7.	(United States) Bob Lienhard	Forst Cantù	409	18.6
8.	(United States) Vic Bartolome	Libertas Livorno	370	17.6
9.	(United States) Joe Isaac	All'Onestà Milano	363	16.5
10.	(Italy) Ottorino Flaborea	Ignis Varese	357	16.2

Source: unofficial statistics compiled by the Giganti del Basket magazine (official statistics started from the 1975–76 season).

== Postseason ==
=== Title playoff ===
The title-deciding playoff was played as a single game on 3 April 1971 at a neutral venue, namely Rome's Palazzo dello Sport. It proved slightly anticlimactic as Ignis raced in front during the first minutes and never allowed Simmenthal back in the game on the way to securing a 65-57 win and their third straight league championship. Manuel Raga was the foremost contributor to Varese's lead, escaping first Giomo's then Giuseppe Brumatti's then Kenney's marking to score 17 points in 12 minutes whilst at the same time the normally accurate Giulio Iellini and Giomo were shooting astray for Milano. With Flaborea and Vittori also potent in attack and Meneghin in defence, Milano's task became even greater despite Masini's efforts as the half-time score read 39-21 for the champions. Though Simmenthal managed to reduce the deficit in the second half, the gulf was too big and Varese were comfortable enough to rest Raga and play eighth man Paolo Polzot (who had arrived from Biella that season and rarely came off the bench) for nearly all the half.

3 April
18:30

Boxscore

Ignis Varese 65, Simmenthal Milano 57
Pts: Manuel Raga 18; Rebs: Ottorino Flaborea 10; Asts: Raga, Ossola 1	Pts: Giuseppe Brumatti 16; Rebs: Arthur Kenney 13; Asts: Giulio Iellini 1

Palazzo dello Sport, Rome
Attendance: 13,312

=== Relegation playoffs ===
The relegation playoffs were played on the 2nd, 3rd and 4 April 1971 in Cantù (originally scheduled in Milan's Palalido, they were moved after student protesters occupied the arena). Each team won and lost a game apiece, Norda Bologna ultimately escaped relegation thanks to a superior points differential (+14 to Livorno's -4 and Biella's -10).

Teams	P	W	L	PF	PA	Relegation
Norda Bologna	2	1	1	112	98	
Libertas Livorno	2	1	1	107	111	Relegated to Serie B
Cecchi Biella	2	1	1	116	126	Relegated to Serie B

2 April
18:00

Report

Norda Bologna 68, Cecchi Biella 49
Pts: Doug Cook 15	Pts: Rudy Bennett 22

Palazzetto dello Sport Parini, Cantù
Referees: Vietti, Solenghi

3 April
18:30

Report

Cecchi Biella 67, Libertas Livorno 58
Pts: Carlo Caglieris 15	Pts: Daniele Stefanini 16

Palazzetto dello Sport Parini, Cantù
Referees: Cino Burcovich, Yurman

4 April
18:00

Libertas Livorno 49, Norda Bologna 44
Pts: Vic Bartolome 20	Pts: Bertolotti, Cook 13

Palazzetto dello Sport Parini, Cantù

== Italian Cup ==
Ignis Varese won nearly all the competitions they played after lifting the Italian Cup, beating Fides Napoli 83-60 in the final, played in Viareggio on 12 April 1971. The third place game between losing semifinalists saw Simmenthal Milano down Forst Cantù 66-63.

== Championship-winning squad ==
Ignis Varese 1969–70 Serie A champions

- (Italy) 4 Edoardo Rusconi
- (Italy) 5 Ottorino Flaborea
- (Italy) 6 Paolo Polzot
- (Italy) 7 Augusto D'Amico
- (Italy) 9 Paolo Vittori
- (Italy) 10 Aldo Ossola
- (Italy) 11 Dino Meneghin
- (Italy) 14 Ivan Bisson
- (Mexico) 15 Manuel Raga
- Coach: (Socialist Federal Republic of Yugoslavia) Aca Nikolić

Source: Lega Basket
