= 1971–72 Serie A (basketball) =

Serie A
- Season: 1971–72
- Duration: 24 October 1971 – 4 April 1972
- Games played: 22
- Teams: 12

Regular season
- Relegated: Stella Azzurra Roma

Finals
- Champions: Simmenthal Milano; 19th title
- Runners-up: Ignis Varese

Statistical leaders
Points	(United States) John Fultz	29.8

Records
- Highest scoring: S. Milano 113–78 Udine (16 January 1972)
- Winning streak: 12 games Ignis Varese
- Losing streak: 9 games Stella Azzurra Roma

The 1971–72 Serie A basketball championship was the 49th season of the Serie A, the highest professional basketball league in Italy.

The regular season ran from 24 October 1971 to 4 April 1972, twelve teams played 22 games each. As Simmenthal Milano and Ignis Varese ended joint first with an equal head-to-head record, a single playoff game decided the title for the second year running. Milano won the game, played in Rome, to break Varese's three-year title streak, taking home their nineteenth overall title (and a spot in the European Champions Cup).

To accommodate a league expansion to 14 teams due the following year, only one side was relegated that season, newly promoted Stella Azzurra Roma went straight back to the Serie B.

== Preseason ==
Holders Ignis Varese were seen as the favourites to retain their title, with habitual rivals Simmenthal Milano – whom they had beat in a title playoff game the previous season – as challengers. Ambitious teams Forst Cantù and Splügen Venezia could take a few points off the leading duo but were not considered as strong enough to join the title fight.

A Nikolić coached Ignis had kept all their major players, with star Mexican Manuel Raga complemented by Italian internationals Dino Meneghin, Ottorino Flaborea, and Ivan Bisson among others. The addition of Tony Gennari and Marino Zanatta (both from Mobilquattro Milano, the re-sponsored All'Onestà) had created an abundance of star players in their squad, something ironically seen as their only potential weakness.

Simmenthal, coached by Cesare Rubini, had virtually kept the same squad yet were seen as more potent, with combative American Art Kenney settled in and youngsters Giulio Iellini and Mauro Cerioni more mature.

== Regular season ==
Simmenthal's title hopes took a dent when they lost 69-67 away to Forst Cantù during the fourth round, leaving Ignis as the only undefeated team at that stage. When the two met in Varese on 9 January 1972, Simmenthal was already in a do-or-die situation, trailing the leaders by four points (having lost again in between, to mid-table Norda Bologna led by league top scorer John Fultz). Ignis' 62-57 win in a nervous game characterized by poor shooting from both sides (Bisson and Renzo Bariviera top-scoring for their respective teams with 16 points each) led some observers to already declare them champions, with their now 6-point lead seen as insurmountable.

However, the same month, Pierluigi Marzorati and Carlo Recalcati helped Cantù end Ignis' four-year invulnerability at home with an 84-83 overtime win that made that claim less certain. Soon after, the leaders lost by a single point again, this time to Venezia after two overtimes, to see their lead on Simmenthal reduced to only two points.

That gap remained the same until the penultimate round game between the two freshly crowned European champions (Ignis winning the Champions Cup and Simmenthal the Cup Winners' Cup) played on 26 March 1972 in Milan. Contrarily to the previous encounter, the game was reportedly an entertaining affair, Cerioni neutralised a diminished Raga defensively whilst adding 18 points to a vindictive Kenney's 21. Meneghin's 28 points were not enough for a Varese missing the injured Bisson, as they were undone 77-72 to concede their hold on first place. Both teams comfortably won their last round games, which meant they finished as joint leaders, making a one-off playoff game at a neutral venue necessary to decide the title.

=== Standings ===
Serie A 1971–72 – Club Locations

Pos	Teams	P	W	L	PF	PA	Champion or relegation
1 ●	Ignis Varese	22	21	1	1805	1380	Title playoff (see below)
2 ●	Simmenthal Milano	22	21	1	1845	1565	Title playoff (see below)
3	Forst Cantù	22	18	4	1852	1675	
4	Splügen Venezia	22	13	9	1627	1579	
5 ●	Norda Bologna	22	11	11	1701	1696	
6 ●	Snaidero Udine	22	11	11	1666	1752	
7	Mobilquattro Milano	22	10	12	1686	1740	
8	Maxmobili Pesaro	22	9	13	1541	1610	
9	Eldorado Bologna	22	8	14	1549	1679	
10	Gorena Padova	22	6	16	1521	1656	
11	Partenope Napoli	22	5	17	1542	1668	
12	Stella Azzurra Roma	22	3	19	1471	1712	Relegation to Serie B

Source: Lega Basket

● Ranking by head-to-head record then points differential in case of tie (see record).

=== Individual scoring table ===
Rank	Name	Team	Points	PPG
1.	(United States) John Fultz	Norda Bologna	655	29.8
2.	(Mexico) Manuel Raga	Ignis Varese	511	23.2
3.	(United States) Gary Schull	Eldorado Bologna	498	22.6
4.	(Italy) Enrico Bovone	Snaidero Udine	492	23.4
5.	(Italy) Carlo Recalcati	Forst Cantù	479	21.8
6.	(United States) Larry Saunders	Gorena Padova	424	19.3
7.	(Brazil) Ubiratan	Splügen Venezia	414	18.8
8.	(United States) Jim Williams	Partenope Napoli	404	18.3
9.	(United States) Bob Lienhard	Forst Cantù	400	18.2
10.	(United States) Art Kenney	Simmenthal Milano	371	16.9

Source: unofficial statistics compiled by the Giganti del Basket magazine (official statistics started from the 1975–76 season).

== Postseason ==
=== Title playoff ===
The title-deciding playoff game was played in Rome's Palazzo dello Sport on 4 April 1972 in front of more than 15,000 people. Raga, having returned to fitness, scored a game-high 25 points, with Meneghin adding 22 points for the defending champions as Varese led by 9 points in the first half. Despite this, a team-effort by Simmenthal's mayor players such as Kenney, Giuseppe Brumatti and captain Massimo Masini allowed them to get back in the game, with the teams tied on 60 with only 29 seconds left to play. Barivera scored twice in succession to allow Milano to win the closely contested game and the league title for the first time in five years.

4 April
21:00

Boxscore

Simmenthal Milano 64, Ignis Varese 60
Pts: Giuseppe Brumatti 14; Rebs: Arthur Kenney 16	Pts: Manuel Raga 25; Rebs: Dino Meneghin 13

Palazzo dello Sport, Rome
Attendance: 15,000

== Italian Cup ==
Simmenthal completed the domestic double over Ignis, beating their rivals 81-77 in Turin to lift the cup. As both teams were already qualified for the 1972–73 European Champions Cup (Milano through the league and Varese by winning the 1972 edition), the spot in the European Cup Winners' Cup was given to Mobilquattro Milano after they beat Forst Cantù 84-83 in the third-place game.

== Championship-winning squad ==
Simmenthal Milano 1971–72 Serie A champions

- (Italy) 5 Giulio Iellini
- (Italy) 6 Giuseppe Brumatti
- (Italy) 7 Doriano Iacuzzo
- (Italy) 8 Massimo Masini
- (Italy) 9 Renzo Bariviera
- (Italy) 10 Mauro Cerioni
- (Italy) 12 Sergio Borlenghi
- (Italy) 13 Paolo Bianchi
- (Italy) 14 Giorgio Giomo
- (United States) 18 Art Kenney
- Coach: (Italy) Cesare Rubini

Source: Lega Basket
