= 1973–74 Serie A (basketball) =

Serie A
- Season: 1973–74
- Duration: 4 November 1973 – 26 May 1974
- Games played: 26
- Teams: 14

Regular season
- Relegated: Alco Bologna (Note: Alco were reprieved from relegation the next season as Saclà Asti voluntarily chose to play in the newly created Serie A2 instead.); Maxmobili Pesaro

Finals
- Champions: Ignis Varese; 7th title
- Runners-up: Innocenti Milano

Statistical leaders
Points	(United States) Bob Morse	28.9

Records
- Highest scoring: Brill Cagliari 110–106 Brina Rieti (24 March 1974)
- Winning streak: 16 games Ignis Varese
- Losing streak: 12 games Maxmobili Pesaro

The 1973–74 Serie A basketball championship was the 51st season of the Serie A, the highest professional basketball league in Italy.

The regular season ran from 4 November 1973 to 5 May 1974, with fourteen teams playing 26 games each. Defending champions Ignis Varese won the title anew (their second in succession and seventh overall) and qualified for the European Champions Cup.

== Preseason ==
One of the major preseason transfers did not concern a player but rather a coach, as Ignis Varese replaced the successful Aca Nikolić with Sandro Gamba, formerly assistant coach at fierce rivals Simmenthal Milano. Despite the league holders losing former captain Ottorino Flaborea, their team was just as strong as they still possessed American sharpshooter Bob Morse as their foreign import and Italian giant Dino Meneghin (generally seen as the best domestic player). Their rivals from Milan also saw a major off-court change with the departure of long-time sponsor Simmenthal who were replaced by car-maker Innocenti, with a subsequent uniform change from red to blue. Regardless of the overhaul, Innocenti Milano kept their coach Cesare Rubini and most of their major Italian players such as Giulio Iellini, Renzo Bariviera, Giuseppe Brumatti and Massimo Masini. However, they had replaced fiery American Art Kenney and Italian international Giorgio Giomo (respectively by unproven compatriot George Brosterhous and promising Vittorio Ferracini).

Ignis started the season as firm favourites to retain their title, having won the domestic league, domestic cup, European Cup and Intercontinental Cup in the previous season. Innocenti Milano, whose ambitions remained high despite a change in sponsorship, and Forst Cantù were expected to be the main rivals. The latter had a roster of players including American centre Bob Lienhard and up-and-coming Italian standouts like Pierluigi Marzorati and Carlo Recalcati, and were heavily tipped as potential contenders to the established order of Ignis and Milano. The promising Luciano Vendemini had also been transferred by Cantù to newly promoted Brina Rieti for a reported fee of 100 million lire, a record at the time.

The other eleven teams in the league were all considered to be about the same level of competitiveness and were not thought to pose a serious challenge to the top three although some clubs, most notably the newly renamed Sinudyne Bologna under coach Dan Peterson, were thought possible outsiders.

Due to league regulations mandating clubs to play in arenas holding at least 3,500 spectators, four clubs relocated for the season, with Forst Cantù, Canon Venezia, Saclà Asti and Brina Rieti respectively moving to arenas in Brescia, Vicenza, Turin and Rome.

== Regular season ==
The first meeting between the undefeated top three sides took place in the sixth round as a red hot Forst Cantù hosted a stop-start Ignis Varese. Form proved key as Marzorati's 31 points and good playmaking helped Cantù comfortably overcome Varese 84-75 as the visitors offered little support to star Bob Morse's 35 points. The winners were joined with a perfect record at first place by Innocenti Milano.

Ignis and Innocenti met on 6 January 1974, with the latter then topping the league (Forst had lost in between). However it was the former that would prevail, toppling Innocenti 78-67 after dominating them in both offense and defence (with 42 rebounds to 29 for example). Though Morse (25 points) and Meneghin (23 points and 20 rebounds) stood out for the winners, it was a clinical team performance that overcame their rivals, who offered little resistance as shown by Brosterhous's poor showing (8 points). With this win, Ignis joined Innocenti and Forst as co-leaders.

The status quo didn't last long as Cantù were left behind after the Milanese beat them 80-75 later that month in the twelfth round as star player Marzorati was hampered by an ankle injury. On 17 February, Innocenti themselves were evicted from first place by a surprise 69-70 defeat to modest Brill Cagliari which left Ignis alone on top. With an injured Brumatti missing for Innocenti, Mauro Cerioni's 26 points were not enough as Brosterhous disappointed with 10 points compared to 20 for Brill's American John Sutter.

Once again the match-up between Ignis and Innocenti, this time in Milan, had aspects of a league final, with the home team needing to win to join Ignis in first place. The Milanese managed to do just that, downing Varese 67-65 in a close-knit tie. Though the visitors led 46-37 at half-time in large part thanks to its star duo of Morse (25 points overall) and Meneghin, they had lost playmaker Aldo Ossola to a season ending knee injury earlier in the game and could not shake off their rivals. Innocenti put in an assured collective performance, with notable performances from Bariviera and Ferracini, clawing at Ignis' lead until Cerioni scored a long range basket with seconds left to take the game.

Despite this victory, Innocenti saw the first place slip away from them in the penultimate league round as they lost 76-68 away to a competitive Forst. Though they missed Lienhard to injury, Cantù could count on the ever reliable Marzorati to answer Barivera's 24 points. The result virtually handed Ignis the title with only one round left to play against uncompetitive opposition and a two-point lead over Innocenti and Forst in second place. This proved to be the case as Ignis Varese had a routine 94-74 win over Brill Cagliari to win the league outright and take home their seventh title. A more undecided competition saw Bob Morse and Brill's John Sutter face each other to determine the league's top scorer, with the first scoring 45 points to Sutter's 28 to take the crown.

Innocenti Milano finished second as Forst Cantù surprisingly lost their final match against Saclà Asti to settle for third place, far ahead of the rest of the league. At the other end of the table, three teams on the same points would face each other in relegation playoffs to avoid joining the long since relegated Maxmobili Pesaro, namely Alco Bologna, Fag Napoli and Snaidero Udine.

=== Standings ===
Serie A 1973–74 – Club Locations (Note: Cantù, Venezia, Asti and Rieti temporarily relocated due to arena requirements (respectively to Brescia, Vicenza, Turin and Rome).)

Pos	Teams	P	W	L	PF	PA	Champion or relegation
1	Ignis Varese	26	24	2	2270	1720	Champion
2	Innocenti Milano	26	23	3	2191	1897	
3	Forst Cantù	26	22	4	2381	1973	
4	Canon Venezia	26	16	10	2083	1984	
5	Sinudyne Bologna	26	15	11	2044	1935	
6	Saclà Asti	26	14	12	2027	2063	
7	Sapori Siena	26	11	15	1968	1979	
8	Brill Cagliari	26	10	16	2046	2223	
9 ●	Mobilquattro Milano	26	9	17	2117	2210	
10 ●	Brina Rieti	26	9	17	1984	2166	
11 ●	Fag Napoli	26	8	18	1968	2325	Relegation playoffs (see below)
12 ●	Snaidero Udine	26	8	18	2071	2172	Relegation playoffs (see below)
13 ●	Alco Bologna	26	8	18	1844	2018	Relegation playoffs (see below)
14	Maxmobili Pesaro	26	5	21	1935	2256	Relegation to Serie A2

● Ranking by head-to-head record then points differential in case of tie (see record).

Source: Lega Basket

=== Individual scoring table ===
Rank	Name	Team	Points	PPG
1.	(United States) Bob Morse	Ignis Varese	753	28.9
2.	(United States) John Sutter	Brill Cagliari	742	28.5
3.	(United States) John Fultz	Norda Bologna	689	26.5
4.	(United States) Chuck Jura	Mobilquattro Milano	650	25
5.	(United States) Steve Hawes	Canon Venezia	641	24.6
6.	(United States) Jim Andrews	Fag Napoli	590	22.6
7.	(United States) Al Sanders	Snaidero Udine	584	22.4
8.	(United States) Bob Lauriski	Brina Rieti	580	22.3
9.	(United States) Carl Johnson	Sapori Siena	525	20.1
10.	(United States) Bob Lienhard	Forst Cantù	512	20.4

Source: unofficial statistics compiled by the Giganti del Basket magazine (official statistics started from the 1975–76 season).

== Postseason ==
=== Relegation playoffs ===
The relegation playoffs were played on 24–26 May 1974 in Genoa. Alco Bologna lost their two games and were relegated to the newly created Serie A2, rendering Snaidero Udine's win over Fag Napoli in the final game anecdotal.

Teams	P	W	L	PF	PA	Relegation
Snaidero Udine	2	2	0	164	154	
Fag Napoli	2	1	1	162	155	
Alco Bologna	2	0	2	130	146	Relegated to Serie A2

24 May

Fag Napoli 76, Alco Bologna 61

Genoa

25 May

Snaidero Udine 70, Alco Bologna 68

Genoa

26 May

Snaidero Udine 94, Fag Napoli 86

Genoa

== Italian Cup ==
Holders and league champions Ignis Varese (missing both Ossola and Meneghin to injury) were upset by relegation contender Snaidero Udine 82-81 in the semi-final with Snaidero's Italian internationals Claudio Malagoli and Giorgio Giomo proving decisive (33 and 22 points respectively).

The final, played in Vicenza on 12 May 1974, saw Sinudyne Bologna down Snaidero 90-74 to claim the cup (and a spot in the European Cup Winners' Cup). In an easy win, the Bolognese were led by American sharpshooter John Fultz as he scored 28 points in his last game for them, while Malagoli (16 points) could not repeat his heroics. In the match for third place, Ignis beat the other semi-finalist Saclà Asti 80-73 to close out their season.

== Championship-winning squad ==
Ignis Varese 1973–74 Serie A champions

- (Italy) 4 Edoardo Rusconi
- (Italy) 5 Sergio Rizzi
- (Italy) 6 Maurizio Gualco
- (Italy) 7 Mauro Salvaneschi
- (Italy) 8 Marino Zanatta
- (United States) 9 Bob Morse
- (Italy) 10 Aldo Ossola
- (Italy) 11 Dino Meneghin
- (Italy) 12 Paolo Polzot
- (Italy) 13 Massimo Lucarelli
- (Italy) 14 Ivan Bisson
- Coach: (Italy) Sandro Gamba

Source: Lega Basket
