= 1969–70 Serie A (basketball) =

Serie A
- Season: 1969–70
- Duration: 2 November 1969 – 12 April 1970
- Games played: 22
- Teams: 12

Regular season
- Relegated: Splugen Brau Gorizia; Brill Cagliari

Finals
- Champions: Ignis Varese; 4th title
- Runners-up: Simmenthal Milano

Statistical leaders
| Points | (United States) Elnardo Webster | 26.9 |

Records
- Highest scoring: S. Milano 133–103 Gorizia (8 February 1970)
- Winning streak: 9 games Ignis Varese
- Losing streak: 13 games Brill Cagliari

The 1969–70 Serie A basketball championship was the 47th season of the Serie A, the highest professional basketball league in Italy.

The regular season ran from 2 November 1969 to 12 April 1970, twelve teams played 22 games each. The team ranked first at the end of the season, Ignis Varese, was crowned champion (earning the single spot in the European Champions Cup) whilst the two lowest ranked teams, Splugen Brau Gorizia and Brill Cagliari, were relegated to the Serie A.

Ignis Varese won their second consecutive league title, fourth overall.

== Season narrative ==
=== Preseason ===
All clubs were allowed only one foreign player though the two clubs engaged in European competition (Ignis Varese and Fides Napoli) recruited another one to play in those competitions and All'Onesta' Milano's Tony Gennari, an American of Italian heritage, had controversially been naturalised as an Italian a few years prior. Nearly all of those foreigners were American, with Varese's Manuel Raga - from Mexico - a notable exception.

The only two clubs without a sponsored name - widely the major source of revenue for clubs - were Virtus Bologna, who had chosen to keep their name intact, and Pallacanestro Cantù, whose sponsor Oransoda had withdrawn from basketball sponsorship.

Ignis Varese, who had won both the domestic league and cup the previous season, was seen as the strong favourite to retain its title, with Simmenthal Milano, All'Onesta' Milano, Virtus Bologna and Fides Napoli cited as their main adversaries. The defending champions had named Aleksandar Nikolić as coach and reinforced a squad already containing Raga, Dino Meneghin, Aldo Ossola and Ottorino Flaborea with former league top-scorer Paolo Vittori, Simmenthal had two arrivals (including Renzo Bariviera) for two departures, with the form of key duo Massimo Masini and Jim Tillman cause for concern, All'Onesta' were counting on American pair Gennari and Joe Isaac, Virtus Bologna - led by captain Dado Lombardi and 1969 NBA draft fourth-pick Terry Driscoll with recent Italy coach Nello Paratore at the helm - were seen as the dark horse for the title, with Napoli – minus Vittori – described as having a competitive but aging squad.

=== Regular season ===
After nine straight wins to open the season, Varese was undone 73-76 after one overtime by Simmenthal Milano on 11 January 1970, allowing the Milanese to close the gap between the two front runners to two points.

The Ignis-sponsored club lost only once more, an 80-88 defeat to Snaidero Udine on 22 March 1970, right before playing Real Madrid in the European Champions Cup. An 82-72 win over Simmenthal during the penultimate game on 6 April took Varese's lead to an unassailable six points over Milano, the only serious contender for the title during a season which saw the holders in near unattainable form, adding the European Champions Cup, Italian Cup and Intercontinental Cup later that year.

The last round of the season took part on 12 April, with only honour at stake, Brill Cagliari - relegated long before with only two wins - upset Virtus Bologna 81-77 at home to earn their third win, the only notable result as all top-ranked sides won. It was another setback for Virtus, who failed to meet predictions as they finished eighth, far behind both Milano squads and Napoli who placed according to forecasts. Splugen Brau Gorizia, the other promoted side that season besides Cagliari, had seen their relegation confirmed the previous round, despite their player Elnardo Webster leading the league in scoring with 593 points (26.9 per game) to Raga's 558 (25.4 pg).

== Standings ==
Serie A 1969–70 – Club Locations

| Pos | Teams | P | W | L | PF | PA | Champion or relegation |
|---|---|---|---|---|---|---|---|
| 1 | Ignis Varese | 22 | 20 | 2 | 1913 | 1593 | Champion |
| 2 | Simmenthal Milano | 22 | 17 | 5 | 2002 | 1761 | |
| 3 | All'Onesta' Milano | 22 | 14 | 8 | 1778 | 1714 | |
| 4 | Fides Napoli | 22 | 13 | 9 | 1765 | 1702 | |
| 5 | Noalex Venezia | 22 | 12 | 10 | 1726 | 1820 | |
| 6 | Pallacanestro Cantù | 22 | 11 | 11 | 1865 | 1879 | |
| 7 (Note: Ranking by head-to-head record in case of tie.) | Eldorado Bologna | 22 | 9 | 13 | 1573 | 1647 | |
| 8 | Virtus Bologna | 22 | 9 | 13 | 1728 | 1756 | |
| 9 | Frizz Pelmo Pesaro | 22 | 9 | 13 | 1774 | 1749 | |
| 10 | Snaidero Udine | 22 | 9 | 13 | 1718 | 1807 | |
| 11 | Splugen Brau Gorizia | 22 | 6 | 16 | 1883 | 1979 | Relegation to Serie B |
| 12 | Brill Cagliari | 22 | 3 | 19 | 1517 | 1835 | Relegation to Serie B |

Source: Lega Basket

== Individual scoring table ==
| Rank | Name | Team | Points | PPG |
|---|---|---|---|---|
| 1. | (United States) Elnardo Webster | Splugen Brau Gorizia | 593 | 26.9 |
| 2. | (Mexico) Manuel Raga | Ignis Varese | 558 | 25.4 |
| 3. | (United States) Joe Allen | Snaidero Udine | 544 | 25.9 |
| 4. | (United States) Gary Schull | Eldorado Bologna | 537 | 24.4 |
| 5. | (United States) Ron Sanford | Noalex Venezia | 516 | 23.5 |
| 6. | (United States) Terry Driscoll | Virtus Bologna | 468 | 21.3 |
| 7. | (United States) Rudy Bogad | Frizz Pelmo Pesaro | 462 | 21.0 |
| 8. | (United States) Jim Tillman | Simmenthal Milano | 462 | 21.0 |
| 9. | (United States) Ed Siudut | Pallacanestro Cantù | 452 | 20.5 |
| 10. | (United States) Jim Williams | Fides Napoli | 448 | 20.4 |

Source: unofficial statistics compiled by Giganti del Basket magazine (official statistics started from the 1975–76 season).

== Italian Cup ==
Ignis Varese also won the Italian Cup after beating Simmenthal Milano 75-66 in the final, played in Rome on 19 April 1970. The third place game between losing semifinalists saw Fides Napoli down All'Onesta' Milano 95-70.

== Championship-winning squad ==
Ignis Varese 1969–70 Serie A champions

- (Italy) 4 Edoardo Rusconi
- (Italy) 5 Ottorino Flaborea
- (Italy) 6 Livio Paschini
- (Italy) 7 Toto Bulgheroni
- (Italy) 8 Giorgio Consonni
- (Italy) 9 Paolo Vittori
- (Italy) 10 Aldo Ossola
- (Italy) 11 Dino Meneghin
- (Italy) 13 Claudio Malagoli
- (Mexico) 15 Manuel Raga
- Coach: (Socialist Federal Republic of Yugoslavia) Aca Nikolić

Source: Lega Basket
