= Elnardo Webster =

Elnardo Webster may refer to:

- Elnardo Webster (American football) (born 1969), American football player
- Elnardo Webster (basketball) (1948–2022), American basketball player
