= List of Lega Basket Serie A season steals leaders =

Lega Basket Serie A season steals leaders are the season by season steals leaders of the top-tier level professional basketball league in Italy, the LBA (first division), and the all-time stats leaders of both the LBA and the Serie A2 (2nd division).

== Steals Leader by season ==
In basketball, steals occur when a player legally forced his opponent to commit a turnover by his positive and aggressive actions such as deflecting or catching the ball. The LBA's steals title is awarded to the player with the highest steals per game average in a given regular season. Prior to the 1987–88 season, the league's leader in steal was the player that scored the most total steals in the league during the season. Since the 1987–88 season, the steals' leader is the player with the highest steals average per game during the season.

Total Steals Leaders (1975–76 to 1986–87)
Season	Player (League's Leader in Steals)	Club	Total Steals	Ref
1976–77	(United States) Chuck Jura	Xerox Milano	100	
1977–78	(United States) Chuck Jura (2×)	Xerox Milano	118	
1978–79	(United States) (Italy) Mike D'Antoni	Billy Milano	93	
1979–80	(United States) (Italy) Mike D'Antoni (2×)	Billy Milano	162	
1980–81	(United States) (Italy) Mike D'Antoni (3×)	Billy Milano	137	
1981–82	(United States) (Italy) Mike D'Antoni (4×)	Billy Milano	149	
1982–83	(United States) (Italy) Mike D'Antoni (5×)	Billy Milano	147	
1983–84	(United States) James Hardy	Snaidero Udine	109	
1984–85	(United States) (Italy) Mike D'Antoni (6×)	Simac Milano	113	
1985–86	(United States) Cedric Henderson	Simac Milano	153	
1986–87	(United States) Rickey Brown	Basket Brescia	133	
1987–88	(United States) Mitchell Anderson	Neutroroberts Firenze	135	

=== By steals average ===
Steals Leader By Steals Average (1988–89 to Present)
Season	Player (League's Leader in Steals)	Club	Steals Average	Ref
1988–89	(United States) Micheal Ray Richardson	Knorr Bologna	3.5	
1989–90	(United States) Joe Binion	Libertas Livorno	3.3	
1990–91	(United States) Chris McNealy	Lotus Montecatini	3.5	
1991–92	(Italy) Riccardo Pittis	Philips Milano	3.8	
1992–93	(Italy) Riccardo Pittis (2×)	Philips Milano	3.5	
1993–94	(Croatia) Arijan Komazec	Pallacanestro Varese	3.5	
1994–95	(United States) Emanual Davis	Teamsystem Rimini	3.1	
1995–96	(Italy) Alberto Rossini	Polti Cantù	3.7	
1996–97	(United States) Jonathan Haynes	Banco di Sardegna Sassari	4.0	
1997–98	(Italy) Germán Scarone	Teamsystem Rimini	3.2	
1998–99	(United States) Jonathan Haynes (2×)	Banco di Sardegna Sassari	4.0	
1999–00	(United States) Charles Smith	Basket Napoli	3.7	
2000–01	(United States) Joey Beard	Teamsystem Rimini	3.8	
2001–02	(Argentina) (Italy) Manu Ginóbili	Virtus Bologna	4.3	
2002–03	(United States) David Vanterpool	Air Avellino	4.2	
2003–04	(United States) Nate Green	Air Avellino	3.9	
2004–05	(United States) Nate Green (2×)	Air Avellino	2.9	
2005–06	(United States) David Hawkins	Lottomatica Roma	3.4	
2006–07	(Puerto Rico) Rick Apodaca	Givova Scafati Basket	2.8	
2007–08	(North Macedonia) (United States) Marques Green	Air Avellino	3.6	
2008–09	(United States) (Italy) Shaun Stonerook	Montepaschi Siena	3.3	
2009–10	(North Macedonia) (United States) Marques Green (2×)	Scavolini Pesaro	3.3	
2010–11	(United States) (Italy) Shaun Stonerook (2×)	Montepaschi Siena	3.3	
2011–12	(United States) Aubrey Coleman	Angelico Biella	3.3	
2012–13	(United States) (Armenia) Bryant Dunston	Pallacanestro Varese	2.1	
2013–14	(United States) (Georgia (country)) Quinton Hosley	Virtus Roma	2.0	
2014–15	(United States) Jerome Dyson	Dinamo Sassari	2.0	
2015–16	(United States) Deron Washington	Vanoli Cremona Basket	1.9	
2016–17	(United States) Aaron Craft	Aquila Basket Trento	2.3	
2017–18	(United States) Randy Culpepper	Pallacanestro Cantù	2.1	
2018–19	(United States) Aaron Craft (2×)	Dolomiti Energia Trentino	2.1	
2019–20	(United States) John Brown	New Basket Brindisi	2.0	
2020–21	(United States) Darius Thompson	New Basket Brindisi	1.7	
2021–22	(United States) Gerald Robinson	Dinamo Sassari	2.0	
