= Ossola (disambiguation) =

Ossola may refer to:

- Ossola, an area of Italy situated to the north of Lago Maggiore, in the Province of Verbano-Cusio-Ossola

== People ==
- Aldo Ossola (born 1945), Italian former basketball player
- Franco Ossola (1921–1949), Italian forward footballer
- Irena Ossola (born 1988), American professional racing cyclist
- Luigi Ossola (1938–2018), Italian professional football player
- Raffaello Ossola (born 1954), Swiss-born Italian surrealist painter
- Rinaldo Ossola (1913–1990), Italian economist and politician
