= Giambattista Cescutti =

Italian basketball player and coach (1939–2023)

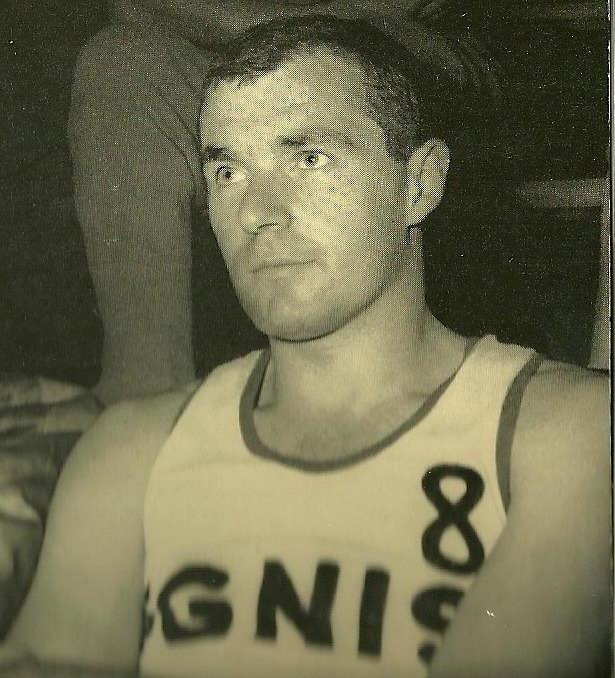
- Born: 13 June 1939; Udine, Italy
- Died: 20 October 2023 (aged 84); Udine, Italy

Giambattista "Nino" Cescutti (13 June 1939 – 20 October 2023) was an Italian professional basketball player and coach. He was a member of the FIBA European Selection Teams, in 1965.

== Club career ==
Born in Udine, Cescutti started playing basketball in the Italian Società Ginnastica Triestina team. After that, he moved to the Italian club Simmenthal Milano. While he was a Milano player, he won the Italian League Scudetto title in 1959.

Cescutti then spent three years playing with the Italian club Victoria Pesaro, with whom he won the title of the Italian Serie A League's Top Scorer twice, in the years 1960 and 1962. After that, Cescutti moved to the Italian club Ignis Varese. While he was a member of Varese, Cescutti won the 1964 Italian League Scudetto title, the 1966 FIBA Intercontinental Cup title, and the 1967 FIBA Saporta Cup title.

== National team career ==
Cescutti was a member of the senior men's Italian national team. He played with Italy in a total of 30 matches. He competed with Italy at the 1963 FIBA World Championship, the 1963 FIBA EuroBasket, and the 1965 FIBA EuroBasket.

== Coaching career ==
After his retirement, Cescutti worked as a physical education teacher, and occasionally served as a basketball coach. While working as a head coach, he won the Swiss Basketball League championship and the Swiss Cup title with SP Federale Lugano. He also earned a league promotion to Italy's top-tier level basketball league, the Lega Basket Serie A, while coaching Associazione Pallacanestro Udinese.

== Death ==
Cescutti died on 20 October 2023, at the age of 84, after he was hit by a car, while walking in his hometown.
