= 1972–73 FIBA European Cup Winners' Cup =

- League: FIBA European Cup Winners' Cup
- Sport: Basketball

Finals
- Champions: (Soviet Union) Spartak Leningrad
- Runners-up: (Socialist Federal Republic of Yugoslavia) Jugoplastika

FIBA European Cup Winners' Cup seasons
- ← 1971–72 1973–74 →

The 1972–73 FIBA European Cup Winners' Cup was the seventh edition of FIBA's 2nd-tier level European-wide professional club basketball competition, contested between national domestic cup champions, running from 18 October 1972, to 21 March 1973. It was contested by 26 teams, five more than in the previous edition.

1971 runner-up Spartak Leningrad, defeated Jugoplastika in the final, to become the first Soviet League team to win the competition, ending a 3-year period of Italian League dominance. It was the second straight final lost by a Yugoslav League team.

== Participants ==
Country	Teams	Clubs
Albania	1	Vllaznia
Austria	1	Mounier Wels
Belgium	1	Racing Antwerpen
Bulgaria	1	Levski-Spartak
Czechoslovakia	1	Spartak ZJŠ Brno
England	1	Sutton & Crystal Palace
Finland	1	NMKY Helsinki
France	1	Olympique Antibes
Greece	1	Olympiacos
Hungary	1	Csepel
Iceland	1	KR
Israel	1	Maccabi Ramat Gan
Italy	1	Mobilquattro Milano
Luxembourg	1	Sparta Bertrange
Morocco	1	WAC
Netherlands	1	Raak Punch
Poland	1	Śląsk Wrocław
Portugal	1	Benfica
Romania	1	Steaua București
Soviet Union	1	Spartak Leningrad
Spain	1	Juventud Schweppes
Sweden	1	Solna
Switzerland	1	Union Neuchâtel
Turkey	1	Galatasaray
West Germany	1	Gießen 46ers
(Socialist Federal Republic of Yugoslavia) Yugoslavia	1	Jugoplastika

== First round ==
Team 1	Agg.	Team 2	1st leg	2nd leg
Vllaznia (Albania)	111–124	(Turkey) Galatasaray	57–64	54–60
WAC (Morocco)	124–206	(Austria) Mounier Wels	66–99	58–107
Sutton & Crystal Palace (England)	147–154	(Portugal) Benfica	76–77	71–77

== Second round ==
Team 1	Agg.	Team 2	1st leg	2nd leg
Galatasaray (Turkey)	121–152	(Poland) Śląsk Wrocław	55–73	66–79
Mobilquattro Milano (Italy)	193–114	(Switzerland) Union Neuchâtel	100–62	84–52
Raak Punch (Netherlands)	165–175	(Greece) Olympiacos	88–68	77–107
Spartak ZJŠ Brno (Czechoslovakia)	189–156	(Austria) Mounier Wels	107–73	82–83
Solna (Sweden)	188–150	(Finland) NMKY Helsinki	93–61	95–89
Csepel (Hungary)	116–165	(France) Olympique Antibes	55–81	61–84
Sparta Bertrange (Luxembourg)	121–187	(Spain) Juventud Schweppes	63–92	58–95
KR (Iceland)	107–229	(West Germany) Gießen 46ers	56–127	51–102
Levski-Spartak (Bulgaria)	141–144	(Socialist Federal Republic of Yugoslavia) Jugoplastika	70–65	71–79
Benfica (Portugal)	166–203	(Belgium) Racing Antwerpen	86–83	80–120
Maccabi Ramat Gan (Israel)	150–153	(Romania) Steaua București	83–72	67–81

Automatically qualified to the eighth finals

- (Soviet Union) Spartak Leningrad

== Top 12 ==
Team 1	Agg.	Team 2	1st leg	2nd leg
Śląsk Wrocław (Poland)	139–145	(Italy) Mobilquattro Milano	69–60	70–85
Olympiacos (Greece)	161–170	(Czechoslovakia) Spartak ZJŠ Brno	87–94	74–76
Solna (Sweden)	131–219	(Soviet Union) Spartak Leningrad	67–115	64–104
Olympique Antibes (France)	139–149	(Spain) Juventud Schweppes	67–71	72–78
Gießen 46ers (West Germany)	166–191	(Socialist Federal Republic of Yugoslavia) Jugoplastika	84–99	82–92
Racing Antwerpen (Belgium)	150–152	(Romania) Steaua București	80–76	70–76

== Quarterfinals ==
The quarter finals were played with a round-robin system, in which every Two Game series (TGS) constituted as one game for the record.

Key to colors
Top two places in each group advance to semifinals

=== Group A ===
	1st leg	2nd leg	Agg
(Italy) Mobilquattro Milano – (Czechoslovakia) Spartak ZJŠ Brno	109-83	75-79	184-162
(Soviet Union) Spartak Leningrad – (Italy) Mobilquattro Milano	72-57	54-59	126-116
(Czechoslovakia) Spartak ZJŠ Brno – (Soviet Union) Spartak Leningrad	74-82	77-82	151-164

	Team	Pld	Pts	W	L	PF	PA	PD
1.	(Soviet Union) Spartak Leningrad	2	4	2	0	290	267	+23
2.	(Italy) Mobilquattro Milano	2	3	1	1	300	288	+12
3.	(Czechoslovakia) Spartak ZJŠ Brno	2	2	0	2	313	348	-35

=== Group B ===
	1st leg	2nd leg	Agg
(Socialist Federal Republic of Yugoslavia) Jugoplastika – (Spain) Juventud Schweppes	90-71	62-76	152-147
(Romania) Steaua București – (Socialist Federal Republic of Yugoslavia) Jugoplastika	87-80	61-82	148-162
(Spain) Juventud Schweppes – (Romania) Steaua București	77-81	72-65	149-146

	Team	Pld	Pts	W	L	PF	PA	PD
1.	(Socialist Federal Republic of Yugoslavia) Jugoplastika	2	4	2	0	314	295	+19
2.	(Spain) Juventud Schweppes	2	3	1	1	296	298	-2
3.	(Romania) Steaua București	2	2	0	2	294	311	-17

== Semifinals ==
Team 1	Agg.	Team 2	1st leg	2nd leg
Spartak Leningrad (Soviet Union)	152–118	(Spain) Juventud Schweppes	95–64	57–54
Jugoplastika (Socialist Federal Republic of Yugoslavia)	178–161	(Italy) Mobilquattro Milano	96–81	82–70

== Final ==
March 20, Alexandreio Melathron, Thessaloniki

Team 1	Score	Team 2
Spartak Leningrad (Soviet Union)	77–62	(Socialist Federal Republic of Yugoslavia) Jugoplastika

1972–73 FIBA European Cup Winners' Cup Champions

Spartak Leningrad
1st title
