= Mario Boni =

Italian basketball player (born 1963)

Personal information
- Born: June 30, 1963 (age 63) Codogno, Lombardy, Italy
- Listed height: 200 cm (6 ft 7 in)
- Listed weight: 92 kg (203 lb)

Career information
- NBA draft: 1986: undrafted
- Playing career: 1984–2006
- Position: Shooting guard / small forward

Career history
- 1982–1983: U. C. Piacentina
- 1983–1985: American Eagle Vigevano
- 1985–1994: Montecatini S.C.
- 1994: Memphis Fire
- 1994: Yakima Sun Kings
- 1995–1996: Montecatini S.C.
- 1996–1998: Aris
- 1998–1999: Calze Pompea Roma
- 1999–2000: Cantabria Lobos
- 2000–2002: Roseto Basket
- 2002–2004: Teramo Basket
- 2004–2005: Sicc Cucine Jesi
- 2005: Virtus Pallacanestro Bologna
- 2005–2006: Montecatini S.C.

Career highlights
- FIBA Korać Cup champion (1997); Greek Cup winner (1998); Italian League Top Scorer (1994)

Mario Boni (born 30 June 1963 in Codogno, Italy) is an Italian former professional basketball player.

Playing as shooting guard or small forward, he had a long career in the Italian leagues, finishing as the top scorer of the top-tier level Serie A, in the 1993–1994 season.

He also played club basketball internationally, most notably for Greek side Aris, with whom he won the 1996–97 FIBA Korać Cup.

== Professional career ==
=== Early career ===
Boni played in the youth ranks of birth town side Fulgor Codogno before joining Unione Cestistica Piacentina of the fifth division Serie C2 in 1982.

The next year he moved to American Eagle Vigevano of the second division Serie A2, they were relegated to the Serie B a year later.

=== Montecatini ===
Riled as a player without a future, that did not have what it took to play at a high level, no one believed in Boni except Montecatini S.C., a Serie B club he joined in 1985.

He stayed 9 years with the Tuscany based club, forming a famous duo with Andrea Niccolai (in Italian) that saw them nicknamed "i gemelli" (the twins). They were both crucial in the successive promotions of Montecatini, first in Serie A2 after the 1986–87 season, then for a historical first promotion to the top tier Serie A in 1989.

Though they were relegated after one season, with Niccolai being sold shortly after, Boni participated in yet another promotion in 1990–91 to return the side to the Serie A. His 765 points during the 1992–93 season were the league's best, though he scored them in 4 more games than official (per mean) top scorer Larry Middleton.

The next year, after a 2 January 1994 game against Onyx Caserta, anabolic agents (nandrolone) were found in the urine sample he provided. Boni denied the doping charges despite the B-sample also coming back positive, he claimed to have unwittingly used an American drug to cure a fever. However the explanation was described as ridiculous by the judge, with the player subsequently banned for two years by the Italian federation.

Despite not playing for the rest of the 1993–94 season, he finished as the league's top scorer with 30,5 points per game on average.

=== Foreign forays ===
Boni later moved to the United States, joining United States Basketball League side Memphis Fire on 4 June 1994. He stayed with the Fire for only a week, leaving on 11 June 1994. A stint with the Yakima Sun Kings of the Continental Basketball Association followed, he finished his U.S. career with 9 and 11,7 points per game respectively for each side. He later described that period as difficult, citing lack of motivation and modest playing conditions.

After the suspension was reduced to 18 months by the federation, Boni rejoined Montecatini, by this time back in Serie A2, staying for the 1995–96 season. At the end of a season, with the team underachieving, the president told Boni that the budget would be reduced and his contract could not be assured.

Taking advantage of the recent Bosman ruling, the Italian signed with Greek Basket League side Aris B.C. in 1996. Struggling to adapt to the Greek game and out of favour with the coach, he had to wait until the arrival of coach Slobodan Subotić to become a starter. He had a decisive contribution to the team's 1997 Korać Cup victory over Turkish side Tofaş, scoring 20 points in the second leg of the final (16 in the first). After winning the Greek Basketball Cup in February 1998, he left the cash-strapped club a few days later.

Signing with Serie A side Calze Pompea Roma in February 1998, Boni only played a handful of games before a doping test revealed the presence of the anabolic steroid clostebol in his body after a 15 March match the same year. Risking a life suspension for his second doping offence, the 35-year-old was instead suspended for 2 years in April 1998, with the admission by doctor Andrea Billi of using a spray containing the product on the player not given credence to. However the player, vocally claiming his innocence, appealed the sentence, it was overturned shortly after by the federal court who accepted Billi's story.

He stayed another year with Rome before joining Spanish Liga ACB side Cantabria Lobos in 1999. Moving to Spain at 36, he struggled to adapt to the league, leaving before the end of the season, with 5,6 points in 18 minutes on average and poor shooting (41% and 27% from the 2 and 3 point line).

=== Later career ===
Returning to Italy permanently in 2000, he finished the season with Roseto Basket, earning yet another promotion to the Serie A, where he played for two seasons.

The next year, with Teramo Basket of the Serie A2, he also helped the team promote to the first division. During the Serie A 2003-04 season, he finished - at 40 - as the league's second best scorer

Boni stayed in Serie A, joining Sicc Cucine Jesi in 2004, where he reunited with Subotić. However, after publicly criticising some teammates on radio, he was suspended by the side in March 2005, moving to Virtus Pallacanestro Bologna. Finishing the season with Virtus, in the second division, he was part of his fifth career promotion as the team won the playoff final.

He returned to Montecatini in 2005, in the second division, there he was reunited with Niccolai on the court, playing a final season together.

Boni moved on to Unione Cestistica Casalpusterlengo of the Serie B1 in 2006, but could not achieve another promotion in the two years he spent there.

== Amateur career ==
Boni returned to Piacentina, of the fourth division Serie C Dilettanti. Playing for them between 2008 and 2010 he won the league cup and contributed to their promotion to the Serie B Dilettanti.

He then turned up for Arese in 2010 and Monza in 2010–11.

Joining Roveleto in 2012, he lost the Serie C Dilettanti playoff final, announcing his retirement soon after in June of the same year.

However he later returned for Meridien Monsummano in September 2013, helping them earn a promotion to the Serie B the same year. Before playing in the competition he left the side in the 2014 preseason, citing the impossible conciliation of training with his other activities, including his role as vice president of GIBA (the Italian players union).

A month later he joined Augies Montecatini, playing in a local amateur division, he is still with the side as of June 2015.

== National team career ==
Despite being the Italian top scorer in the league on a regular basis, he only played a solitary game for the Italian national team, an 11 February 1992 friendly against Czechoslovakia, scoring 9 points.

Boni won the FIMBA Over 50 basketball World Cup with the Italian representative side in July 2013, scoring 45 points in a 79–73 victory, coincidentally played in Thessaloniki.

== Personal ==
He is referred to by the nicknames Super Mario or "Mitraglia" (machine gun), the latter for his deadly shooting.
