= Elnardo Webster (basketball) =

American basketball player (1948–2022)

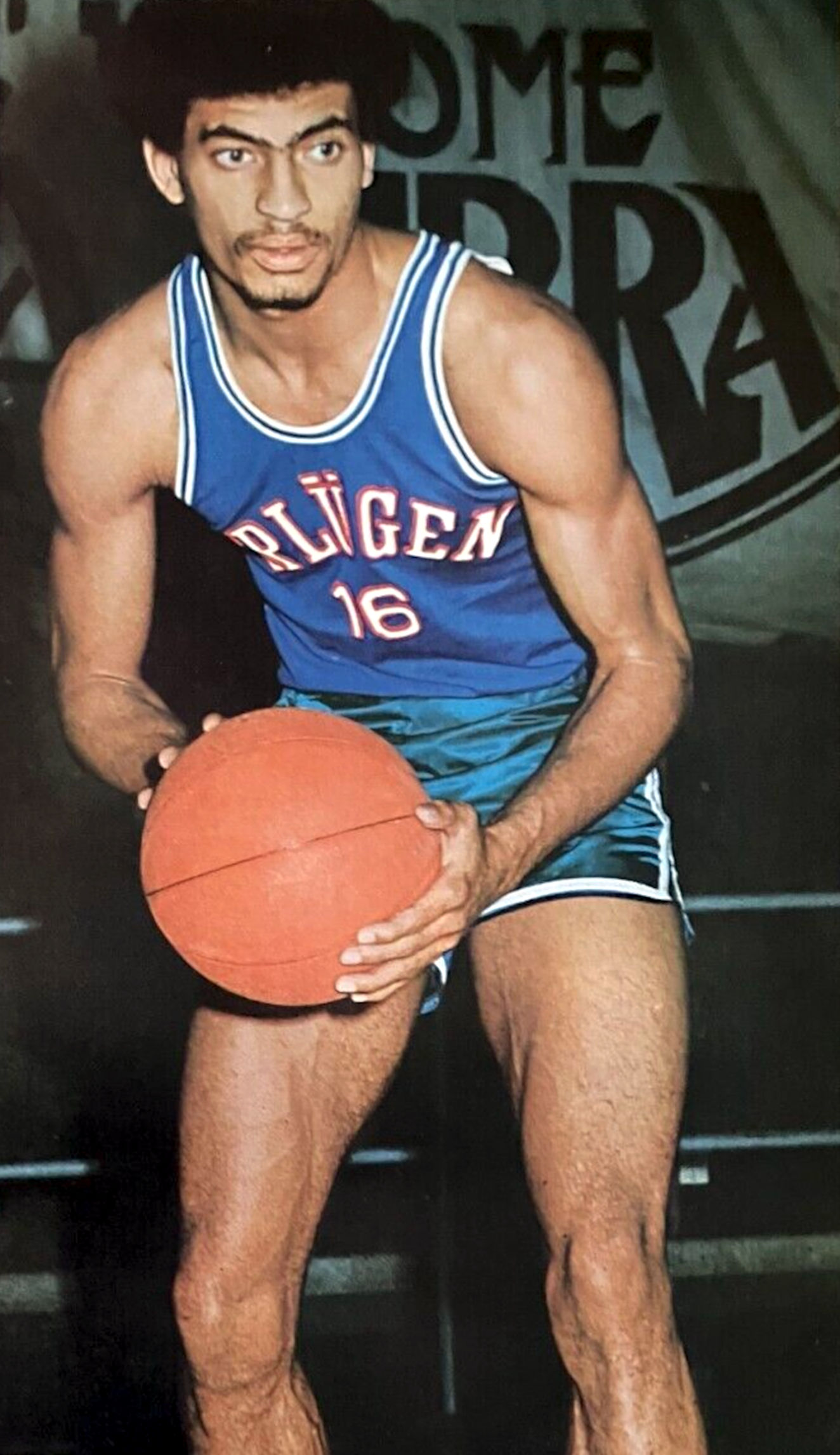
- Webster playing for UG Goriziana in the 1969–70 season

Personal information
- Born: March 6, 1948 Jersey City, New Jersey, U.S.
- Died: March 22, 2022 (aged 74) Morristown, New Jersey, U.S.
- Listed height: 6 ft 5 in (1.96 m)
- Listed weight: 190 lb (86 kg)

Career information
- High school: Lincoln (Jersey City, New Jersey)
- College: Wharton County JC (1965–1967); Saint Peter's (1967–1969)
- NBA draft: 1969: 4th round, 54th overall pick
- Drafted by: New York Knicks
- Playing career: 1969–1976
- Position: Small forward
- Number: 4

Career history
- 1969–1970: UG Goriziana
- 1971: New York Nets
- 1971–1972: Memphis Pros
- 1972–1973: Wilkes-Barre Barons
- 1973–1974: Cajabilbao
- 1975–1976: Wilkes-Barre Barons

Career highlights
- Italian League Top Scorer (1970); CBA champion (1973)
- Stats at Basketball Reference

Elnardo Julian Webster Sr. (March 6, 1948 – March 22, 2022) was an American professional basketball player who played one season in the American Basketball Association (ABA). He played college basketball for the Saint Peter's Peacocks. Webster played in the ABA for the New York Nets and Memphis Pros during the 1971–1972 season. He also played in the Lega Basket Serie A in Italy. At a height of 6 feet 5 inches (1.96 m), he played at the small forward position.

== Early life ==
Webster was born in Jersey City, New Jersey, on March 6, 1948. He attended Lincoln High School in his hometown, before studying at Wharton County Junior College from 1965 to 1967. He later transferred to Saint Peter's College.

== College career ==
Despite only playing two years with the Peacocks, Webster finished with 1,338 points and 769 rebounds. His 24.8 points per game scoring average was second only to Keydren Clark (25.9) in school history, while his rebounding average is first. He was noted for leading the Peacocks' 1967–68 team – nicknamed the "Run Baby Run" team – to the semifinals of the 1968 National Invitation Tournament. He scored 51 points in the first-round win against Marshall, before following that performance up with 29 points in a 100–71 upset over Duke. In all 28 games that season, he recorded double digits in points scored, averaging 24.1 points and 14.6 rebounds.

Webster was inducted into the Metro Atlantic Athletic Conference (MAAC) Hall of Fame in 2012. Four years later, he was enshrined into Saint Peter's Hall of Fame.

== Professional career ==
Webster was selected in the 4th round of the 1969 NBA draft by the New York Knicks. He ultimately did not make the team. He then played in the Serie A – Italy's top-tier level league – with UG Goriziana in the 1969–70 season.

Webster was forced to take the 1970–71 season off, while recovering from tuberculosis. He subsequently played with the New York Nets and the Memphis Pros in the American Basketball Association (ABA) during the 1971–72 season. He made his ABA debut on January 2, 1972, scoring four points in ten minutes played against the Kentucky Colonels. He was eventually released by the Nets after his final appearance for the franchise on January 18, before being signed as a free agent by the Pros at the end of February that same year. He played his final ABA game on March 29, 1972. In his single season in the ABA, Webster scored 122 points to go along with 16 assists and 44 rebounds.

In the 1972–73 basketball season, he played for the Garden State Colonials in their inaugural season in the Eastern Basketball Association.

Webster also had overseas stints playing professional basketball in Spain and Switzerland in a career that spanned seven years.

== Post-basketball career ==
After retiring from basketball, Webster went into the field of education, focusing on helping children from inner cities. He was awarded a doctorate in educational leadership by Seton Hall University in 2000. After working as an administrator in the Newark public school system, he served as superintendent for the Roselle school system from 2007 to 2009. In 2010, he filled a vacant seat in the city council of West Orange, New Jersey. He was also a consultant for the Commissioner of the New Jersey Department of Education as a Highly Skilled Professional.

Back at his alma mater, he directed a learning center for afterschool programs and extended learning at Saint Peter's. He also served on the university's board of trustees from 2008 to 2017 and again from 2021 till his death.

== Personal life ==
Webster was married to Sandra until his death. Together, they had two children: Elnardo Jr. and Damarko.

Webster died on March 22, 2022, in Morristown, New Jersey. He was 74, and suffered from a heart issue prior to his death.
