= Luigi Ossola =

Italian footballer

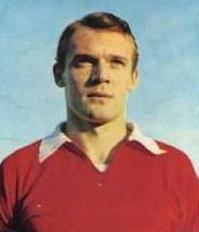
- Ossola in 1965

Personal information
- Date of birth: June 9, 1938
- Place of birth: Varese, Italy
- Date of death: July 7, 2018 (aged 80)
- Height: 1.74 m (5 ft 8 1/2 in)
- Position: Midfielder

Senior career*
Years	Team	Apps	(Gls)
1960–1966	Varese	166	(19)
1966–1968	Roma	18	(0)
1968–1971	Mantova	101	(5)
- * Club domestic league appearances and goals

Luigi Ossola (June 9, 1938 – July 7, 2018) was an Italian professional football player.

He played for 4 seasons (76 games, 7 goals) in the Serie A for A.S. Varese 1910 and A.S. Roma.

His younger brother Aldo Ossola was a very successful basketball player.
