= Bob Morse =

American basketball player

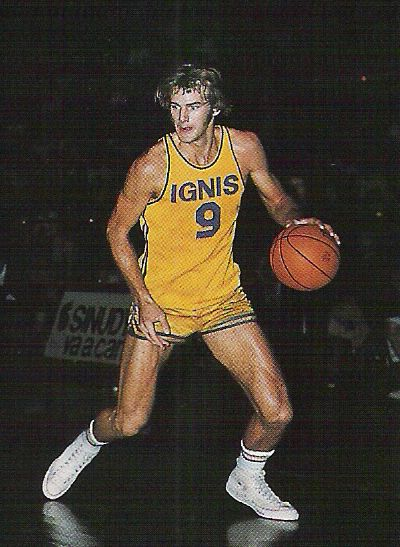
- Bob Morse, while playing with Ignis Varese, 1973. (Photo Meazza)

Personal information
- Born: January 4, 1951 (age 75) Philadelphia, Pennsylvania, U.S.
- Listed height: 6 ft 8 in (2.03 m)
- Listed weight: 215 lb (98 kg)

Career information
- High school: Kennett (Kennett Square, Pennsylvania)
- College: Penn (1969–1972)
- NBA draft: 1972: 3rd round, 32nd overall pick
- Drafted by: Buffalo Braves
- Playing career: 1972–1986
- Position: Small forward / power forward
- Number: 9

Career history
- 1972–1981: Varese
- 1981–1984: Olympique Antibes
- 1984–1986: Reggiana

Career highlights
- FIBA Intercontinental Cup champion (1973); 3× EuroLeague champion (1973, 1975, 1976); FIBA Saporta Cup champion (1980); 4× Italian League champion (1973, 1974, 1977, 1978); Italian Cup winner (1973); 6× Italian League Top Scorer (1973–1975, 1979–1981); FIBA's 50 Greatest Players (1991); 50 Greatest EuroLeague Contributors (2008); Italian Basketball Hall of Fame (2023); Second-team All-American – NABC (1972); First-team All-Ivy League (1972)

Career LBA statistics
- Points: 9,775 (27.8 PPG)
- Stats at Basketball Reference

Robert Duncan Morse (born January 4, 1951) is an American former professional basketball player. He was named one of FIBA's 50 Greatest Players in 1991. In 2008, Morse was chosen as one of the 50 most influential personalities in European club basketball, over the previous half-century. He was inducted into the Italian Basketball Hall of Fame in 2023.

== High school ==
Morse attended Kennett High School, in Kennett Square, Pennsylvania, where he played high school basketball. He was a prolific scorer for the Pennsylvania high school.

== College career ==
Morse graduated from the University of Pennsylvania in 1972, after playing college basketball with the Penn Quakers. He led the team in scoring in each of the three seasons, from 1969–70 to 1971–72, in which Penn's win–loss record was 78–6, including two NCAA Division I Elite Eight appearances (1971 and 1972). He co-captained the 1972 squad, along with Corky Calhoun, and was awarded the Class of 1915 Award, as the outstanding student-athlete of the Class of 1972. Morse was elected to the Philadelphia Big Five Hall of Fame in 1977.

== Club playing career ==
Morse's tremendous scoring ability helped the great Italian League club, Pallacanestro Varese to win three EuroLeague championships in the 1970s (1973, 1975, and 1976), in seven consecutive EuroLeague Finals appearances, and to win four Italian League Championships (1973, 1974, 1977, 1978). Morse led the Italian League in scoring for six seasons. His career averages for 11 seasons played in the Italian League were 27.8 points and 8.9 rebounds per game. He shot 60.9% from the field, 85.9% from the free throw line, and 54.5% from three-point distance.

== Post-playing career ==
In 2007, Morse earned a Master of Arts in the Italian language, from the University of Virginia. In 2009, in recognition of his contributions on and off the court, the City Council of Varese, Italy, made Morse an honorary citizen of the city. In 2016, after nine years of teaching Italian at Saint Mary's College (Indiana), Morse retired. He currently resides in Portland, Oregon.
