= Elnardo Webster (American football) =

Italian gridiron football player (born 1969)

Elnardo Webster II
No. 92
- Position: Linebacker

Personal information
- Born: December 23, 1969 (age 56); Gorizia, Italy
- Listed height: 6 ft 2 in (1.88 m)
- Listed weight: 243 lb (110 kg)

Career information
- High school: Saint Peter's Prep (Jersey City, New Jersey, U.S.)
- College: Rutgers
- NFL draft: 1992: 9th round, 235th overall pick

Career history
- Pittsburgh Steelers (1992)

Awards and highlights
- First-team All-East (1991)
- Stats at Pro Football Reference

Elnardo Julian Webster II (born December 23, 1969) is a former American football linebacker who played one season with the Pittsburgh Steelers of the National Football League (NFL). He was selected by the Steelers in the ninth round of the 1992 NFL draft. He played college football at Rutgers University and attended St. Peter's Preparatory School in Jersey City, New Jersey.

== College career ==
Webster lettered for the Rutgers Scarlet Knights from 1988 to 1991. He earned honorable mention All-Big East honors in 1990 and first-team All-Big East accolades in 1991.

== Professional career ==
Webster was selected by the Pittsburgh Steelers with the 235th pick in the 1992 NFL draft. He played in three games for the Steelers during the 1992 season. He was placed on injured reserve with a knee injury on September 22, 1992. Webster was released by the Steelers on August 24, 1993.

== Personal life ==
Webster earned his BA, MBA and JD degrees from Rutgers University and Rutgers Law School. He works as a lawyer in East Orange, New Jersey.

He is the son of former professional basketball player Elnardo Webster Sr.
