= Sergio Stefanini =

Italian basketball player (1922–2009)

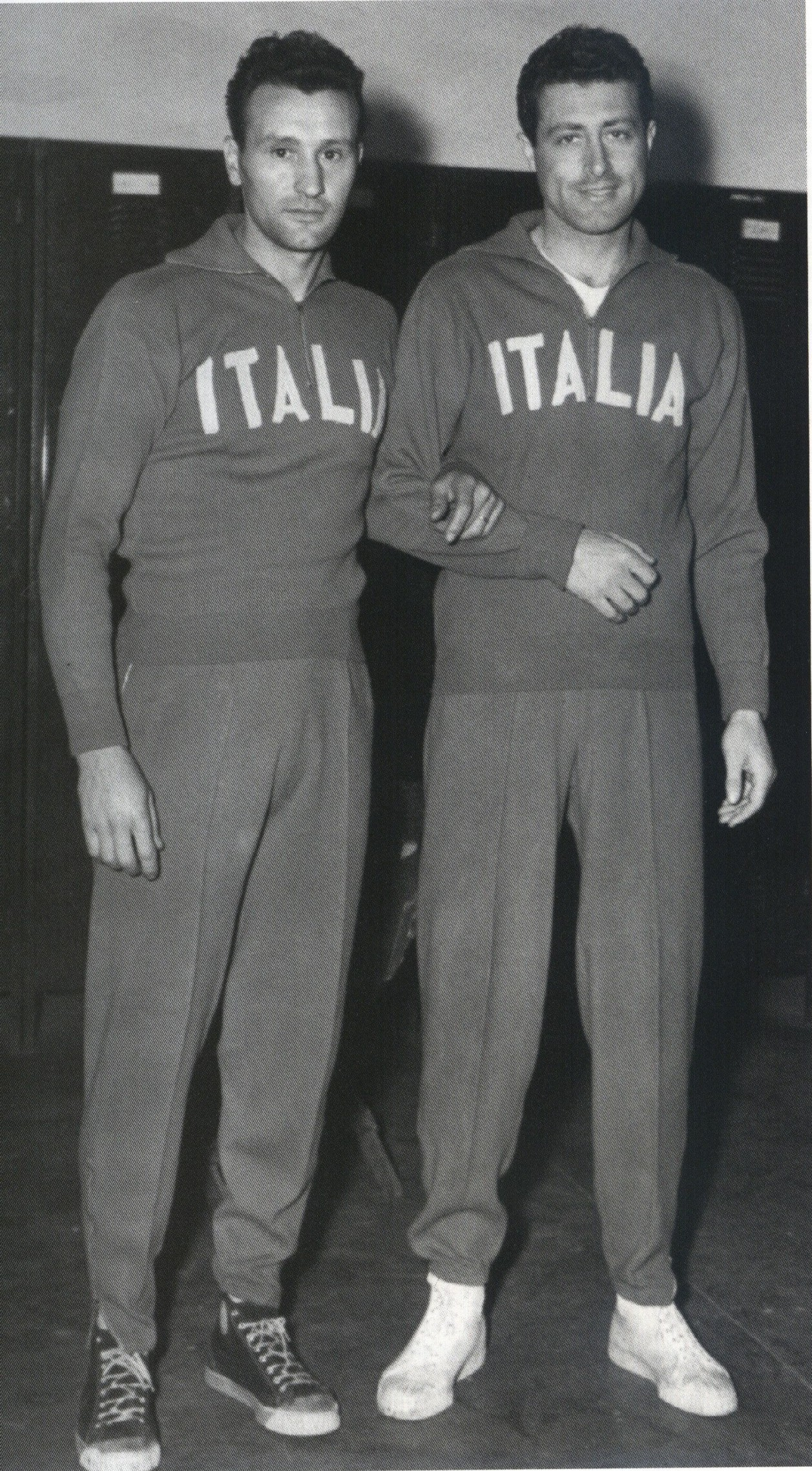
- Sergio Stefanini (right) in 1951.

Personal information
- Nationality: Italian
- Born: 18 February 1922; Marostica, Italy
- Died: 7 August 2009 (aged 87); Manerba del Garda, Italy

Sport
- Sport: Basketball

Sergio Stefanini (18 February 1922 – 7 August 2009) was an Italian basketball player. He competed in the men's tournament at the 1948 Summer Olympics and the 1952 Summer Olympics.
