= Romeo Romanutti =

Dalmatian Italian basketball player (1926–2007)

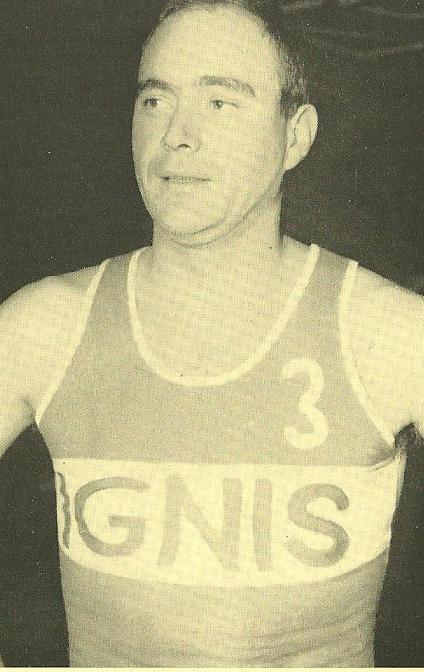
- Romeo Romanutti

Personal information
- Nationality: Italian
- Born: 6 August 1926; Split, Croatia
- Died: 31 December 2007 (aged 81)

Sport
- Sport: Basketball

Romeo Romanutti (6 August 1926 – 31 December 2007) was a Dalmatian Italian basketball player. He competed in the men's tournament at the 1948 Summer Olympics.
