= Montecatiniterme Basketball =

Montecatiniterme Basketball is an Italian basketball team that is based in Montecatini Terme, Tuscany.

== History ==
Established in 1949, the first incarnation of the club, Montecatini Sporting Club, played in the first division Serie A from 1989 to 2001 (with spells in the second division Serie A2) before declaring bankruptcy in 2001.

The club was reestablished in 2002 when a new ownership brought the sporting rights of neighbours Massa e Cozzile to play in the third division Serie B1. Promoted after one season, the side stayed in the second division LegaDue until 2008, before folding two years later.

Montecatini Sporting Club 1949, formed by former player Andrea Niccolai, was formed to succeed the side in 2010, buying the sporting rights of Certaldo to play in the Serie C Dilettanti. The club would earn promotion and win the league's cup during its initial season. Faced with problems raising a budget in order to play in the Serie C, Niccolai decided to withdraw the club (that did not have large debts) from the league on 9 July 2014.

== Notable players ==
2000's

- (United States) Cory Carr 1 season: '06-'07
- (United States) HL Coleman 1 season: '06-'07
- (Austria) Bernd Volcic 1 season: '06-'07
- (United States) Antonio Smith 1 season: '05-'06
- (United States) Marc Salyers 1 season: '05-'06
- (United States) Joe Troy Smith 1 season: '04-'05
- (Panama) Michael Hicks 1 season: '04-'05
- (United States) J. R. Koch 1 season: '04-'05
- (Italy) Massimiliano Monti 1 season: '04-'05
- (Italy) Valerio Spinelli 1 season: '03-'04
- (United States) Preston Shumpert 1 season: '03-'04
- (United States) Ryan Hoover 1 season: '03-'04
- (United States) Corsley Edwards 1 season: '03-'04
- (United States) Charles Jones 1 season: '00-'01

1980's

- (Italy) Mario Boni 11 seasons: '85-'94, '95-'96, '05-'06
- (Italy) Andrea Niccolai 13 seasons: '84-'90, '98-'00, '05-'10

== Sponsorship names ==
Throughout the years, due to sponsorship, the club has been known as:

- Sharp Montecatini (1987–1989)
- Panapesca Montecatini (1989–1990)
- Lotus Montecatini (1990–1992)
- Bialetti Montecatini (1992–1994)
- Panapesca Montecatini (1994–1996)
- Chc Montecatini (1996–1997)
- Snai Montecatini (1997–1999)
- Zucchetti Montecatini (1999–2000)
- BingoSnai Montecatini (2000–2001)
- Agricola Gloria Montecatini (2003–2010)
