= Gianfranco Lombardi =

Italian basketball player and coach (1941–2021)

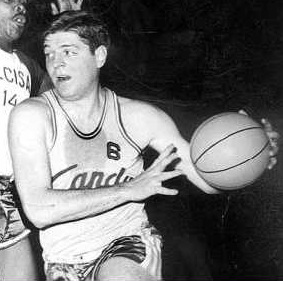
- Lombardi c. 1965–66

Personal information
- Born: 20 March 1941 Livorno, Italy
- Died: 22 January 2021 (aged 79) Cocquio-Trevisago, Varese, Italy
- Listed height: 6 ft 4.5 in (1.94 m)
- Listed weight: 212 lb (96 kg)

Career information
- Playing career: 1956–1973
- Position: Small forward
- Coaching career: 1972–2001

Career history

Playing
- 1956–1958: Pallacanestro Livorno
- 1958–1970: Virtus Bologna
- 1970–1972: Fortitudo Bologna
- 1972–1973: AMG Sebastiani Rieti

Coaching
- 1972–1975: AMG Sebastiani Rieti
- 1976–1977: Trieste
- 1977: Libertas Forlì
- 1977–1982: Trieste
- 1982–1983: Treviso
- 1983–1986: Reggiana
- 1986–1987: Rimini
- 1988–1989: Scaligera Verona
- 1990–1992: Mens Sana Siena
- 1992–1994: Libertas Livorno
- 1995–1997: Cantù
- 1997–2000: Reggiana
- 2000–2001: Varese
- 2001: Basket Napoli

Career highlights
- As player: 2× Italian League Top Scorer (1964, 1967); Italian Basketball Hall of Fame (2006)

Gianfranco "Franco" Lombardi (20 March 1941 – 22 January 2021) was an Italian professional basketball player and coach. During his playing career, his nickname was "Dado". In 2006, he was inducted into the Italian Basketball Hall of Fame.

== Professional playing career ==
During his club career, Lombardi led the top-tier level Italian League in scoring, in 1964 and 1967.

== National team playing career ==
Lombardi was a part of the senior Italian national basketball teams that won a gold medal at the 1963 Mediterranean Games and finished in the fourth, fifth and eighth places at the 1960 Summer Olympics, the 1964 Summer Olympics, and the 1968 Summer Olympics, respectively.

== Coaching career ==
After he retired from playing basketball, Lombardi had a long coaching career, working as a head coach for numerous teams in the Italian League.

== Eurovision Song Contest 1987 ==
In 1987, at the Eurovision Song Contest in Brussels, Belgium, he conducted the Italian entry, "Gente di mare", performed by Umberto Tozzi and Raf, placing third with 103 points, and receiving the maximum score of 12 points from 5 national juries.
