= Paolo Vittori =

Italian basketball player and coach

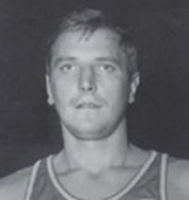

Personal information
- Born: 31 May 1938 (age 88) Gorizia, Italy
- Listed height: 6 ft 3 in (1.91 m)
- Listed weight: 200 lb (91 kg)

Career information
- Playing career: 1958–1974
- Position: Small forward
- Coaching career: 1975–1976

Career history

Playing
- 1958–1959: Motomorini Bologna
- 1959–1965: Olimpia Milano
- 1965–1967: Varese
- 1967–1969: Partenope
- 1969–1972: Varese
- 1972–1974: AMG Sebastiani Rieti

Coaching
- 1965–1966: Varese (player-coach)
- 1975–1976: AMG Sebastiani Rieti

Career highlights
- As player: 3× FIBA Intercontinental Cup champion (1966, 1970, 1973); 2× EuroLeague champion (1970, 1972); FIBA European Selection (1964); FIBA Saporta Cup champion (1967); 6× Italian League champion (1960, 1962, 1963, 1965, 1970, 1971); 2× Italian Cup winner (1970, 1971); 2× Italian League Top Scorer (1961, 1965); Italian Basketball Hall of Fame (2006)

Paolo Vittori (born 31 May 1938) is a retired Italian professional basketball player and coach. In 2006, he was inducted into the Italian Basketball Hall of Fame.

== Professional career ==
Vittori was a member of the FIBA European Selection, in 1964.

== National team career ==
Vittori was a part of the senior Italian national basketball teams that won a gold medal at the 1963 Mediterranean Games, and finished fourth, fifth, and eighth at the 1960 Summer Olympics, the 1964 Summer Olympics, and the 1968 Summer Olympics, respectively.
