= Nuova Pallacanestro Gorizia =

Italian professional basketball club

- Nickname: Ugg
- Founded: 1934
- Dissolved: 2010
- History: Unione Ginnastica Goriziana; 1934-1999; Nuova Pallacanestro Gorizia; 1999-2010
- Arena: PalaBigot (4.730 seats)
- Location: Gorizia, Friuli-Venezia Giulia, Italy
- Team colors: White and blue
| Home | Away |

Nuova Pallacanestro Gorizia was an Italian professional basketball club based in Gorizia, Friuli-Venezia Giulia. It ceased activities in 2010 due to financial problems.

== History ==
Union Ginnastica Goriziana was founded in 1868, with the basketball section officially established in 1934. The team would reach the first division Serie A in 1952, staying there for two seasons. Goriziana played five Serie A seasons in the 1960s (1961–62, 1963–65, 1966–67, 1969–70) without gaining a foothold in the league. It yoyo-ed between the top tier and the second tier Serie A2 from 1975 to 1984, following which it stayed in the Serie A2 until 1998. A solitary season back in the Serie A would see the club escape relegation on the court only for the management to sell the sporting rights to Scavolini Pesaro and move down to the third division Serie B1. The team started again from the third division Serie B1 as Nuova Pallacanestro Gorizia. However, it continued struggling on and off the court and was in the Serie C dilettanti when it withdrew from the league in September 2010 due to the owner refusing to fund the club on his own. The club did not take part in another league and stopped functioning that year.

== Sponsorship names ==
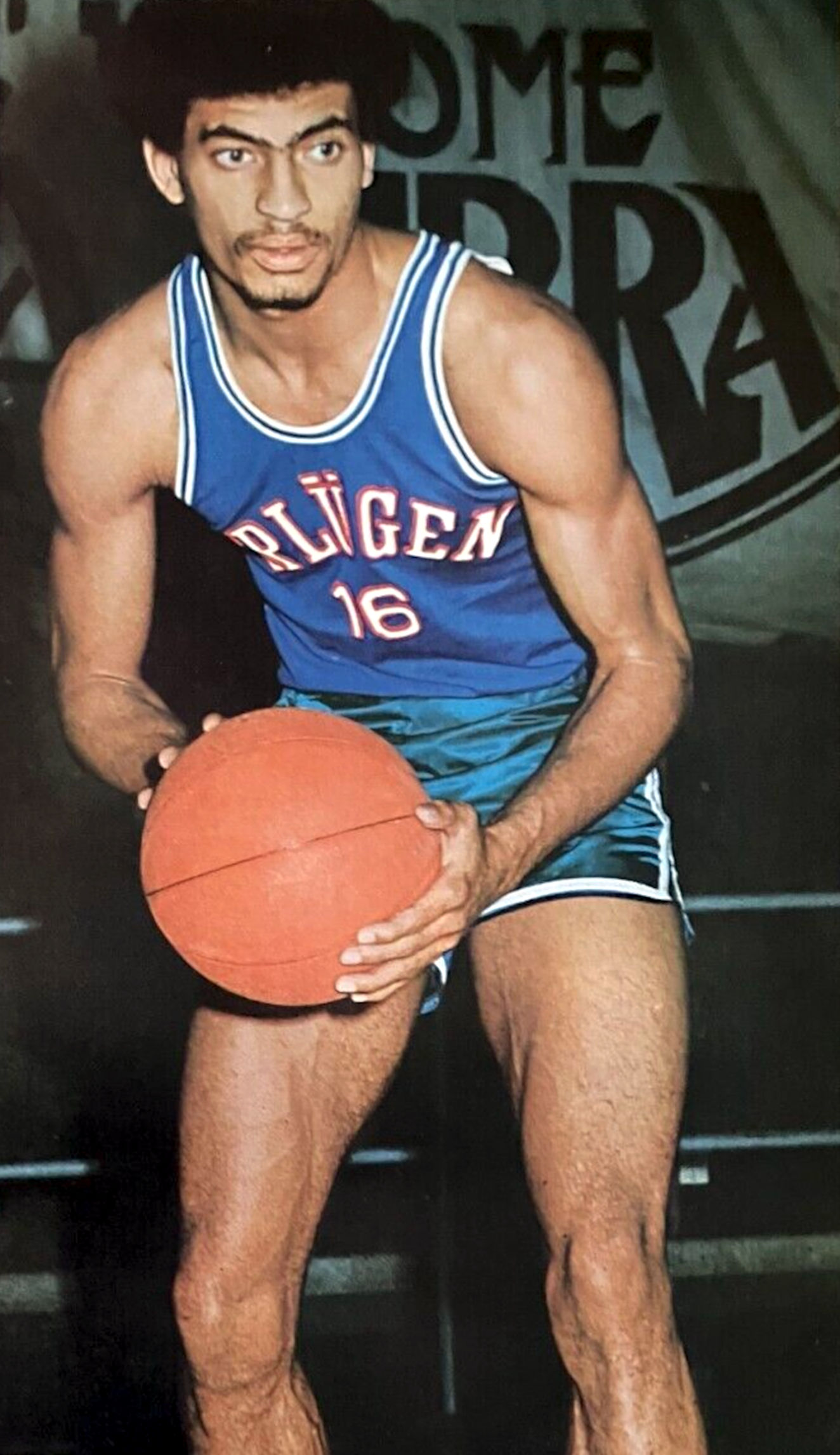
Elnardo Webster playing for Splügen Brau Gorizia in the 1969–70 season

Throughout the years, due to sponsorship deals, it has been also known as:

- Zoppas Gorizia (1961–1962)
- Unione Ginnastica Goriziana (1962–1964)
- Splügen Brau Gorizia (1966–1970)
- Patriarca Gorizia (1975–1976)
- Pagnossin Gorizia (1976–1980)
- Tai Ginseng Gorizia (1980–1981)
- San Benedetto Gorizia (1981–1984)
- Segafredo Gorizia (1984–1988)
- San Benedetto Gorizia (1988–1990)
- Brescialat Gorizia (1994–1996)
- Dinamica Gorizia (1996–1997)
- SDAG Gorizia (1998–1999)
