= Giorgio Giomo =

Italian basketball player (born 1949)

Personal information
- Born: 24 May 1949 (age 77) Treviso, Italy
- Height: 1.82 m (6 ft 0 in)
- Weight: 76 kg (168 lb)

Sport
- Sport: Basketball
- Club: Olimpia Milano
Medal record
Representing Italy
European Championships
Bronze medal – third place	1971 Germany	Team
European U-18 Championship
Bronze medal – third place	1968 Spain	Team

Giorgio Giomo (born 24 May 1949) is a retired Italian basketball player who won a bronze medal at the 1971 European Championships and finished fourth at the 1972 Olympics. His elder brother Augusto competed for Italy at the 1960 and 1964 Games.
