= Chuck Jura =

American basketball player

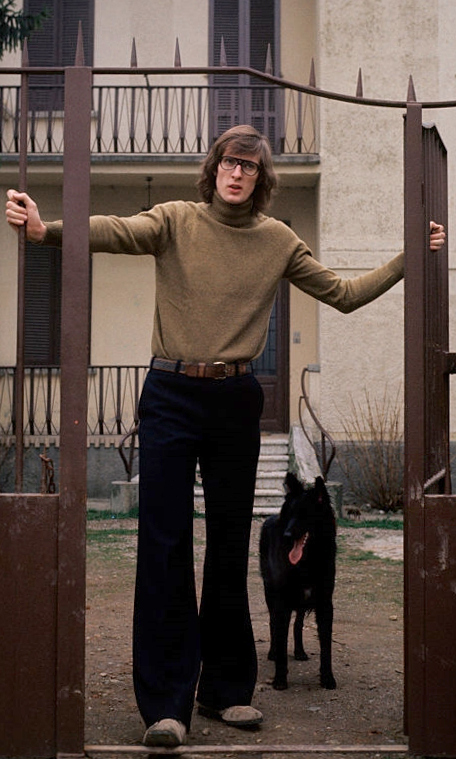
- Jura in front of his Italian house, 1975

Personal information
- Born: March 28, 1950 (age 76) Schuyler, Nebraska, U.S.
- Listed height: 6 ft 10 in (2.08 m)
- Listed weight: 220 lb (100 kg)

Career information
- High school: Schuyler (Schuyler, Nebraska)
- College: Nebraska (1969–1972)
- NBA draft: 1972: 3rd round, 45th overall pick
- Drafted by: Chicago Bulls
- Playing career: 1972–1985
- Position: Center
- Number: 54, 11

Career history
- 1972–1979: Mobilquattro/Xerox Milano
- 1979–1980: Federale Lugano
- 1980–1982: Basket Mestre
- 1982–1983: Sav Bergamo
- 1984–1985: Master Valentino Roma

Career highlights
- 3× Italian League Top Scorer (1976–1978); First-team All-Big Eight (1972)

Career LBA statistics
- Points: 9,870
- Stats at Basketball Reference

Charles Jura (born March 28, 1950) is an American former professional basketball player.

After a successful high school and college career in his native Nebraska, he spent all but one year of his professional career in Italy where he became one of the Serie A's best players, leading the league in scoring three times.

== High school career ==
Playing for Schuyler High, Jura and teammates such as Gene Harmon formed the Jolly Green Giants (named so because of their height and jersey colour) who reached the Nebraska Class B finals in 1967 and 1968. Jura averaged 26 points and 15 rebounds per game in 1967 as a dominant force in the paint, though Schuyler were undone in the state final, he was selected to the All-State Class B Team by the Lincoln Sunday Journal and Star.

The Jolly Green Giants would win the Class B title the next year after beating Seward 73–54. Jura, averaging 30 points per game for 1967–1968, contributed a record-breaking 109 points in 3 state tournament games. He was again All-State and also received All-American accolades.

At his graduation in 1968, he had scored 1431 career points, of which 201 came in the state tournament (in the all-time top 10 until at least 2006) and a few came from a record 20 field goals scored in a single 1968 game, he was inducted into the Nebraska High School Hall of Fame in 1995.

== College career ==
Jura stayed in state for college, joining the University of Nebraska, who played in the Big Eight Conference of the NCAA University Division. He took part in 25 games in his first year as a sophomore, (Note: Freshmen were ineligible until 1972) posting 9.9 points and 7.7 rebounds (both team second-bests) in 1969–70.

His 59.2% field-goal percentage as a junior was the seventh best in the nation. He had 17.5 points and 9.3 rebounds (team second bests) in 26 games over the season, on his way to a Second-team All-Big Eight selection.

For his senior season, Jura's 305 rebounds were nearly twice as many as the next best Nebraska player, for a then single-season record 11.7 rebounds per game which allowed him to lead the Big Eight in rebounding. He added 551 points, with an average of 21.2 points, over 26 games, second only to Bud Stallworth in the conference. He received First-team All-Big Eight, First-team academic All-Big Eight, First-team NCAA All-District 5 and Third-team academic All-American honours at the end of the season. His last collegiate game was the NABC college All-Star game where he was selected on the West team.

As of the 2014–15 season, Jura's career 740 rebounds rank as the seventh-best in Nebraska history at a rate of 9.6 per game (third-best), whilst his 1,255 points see him placed fifteenth on the all-time Nebraska scoring chart, with his 16.3 points average seventh-best and his .549 field goal percentage eighth-best. He was a charter member of the Nebraska Basketball Hall of Fame when the college created it in 1989.

== Professional career ==
Selected by the Chicago Bulls in the third round (45th overall) of the 1972 NBA draft and the ABA's Utah Stars, Jura instead moved to the Italian Serie A, signing with Mobilquattro Milano in June 1972. The American quickly adapted to Italy and the Italian game, becoming Milano's leader and one of the league's best players thanks to his atypical – for a center of his height – technical skills and speed. He led the Serie A in scoring during three consecutive seasons from 1976 to 1978 – with 33.2, 32.9 and 29.6 points per game respectively – and is still to this day the only player to have led both the scoring and rebounding charts in the same season (1976–77).

Jura was signed by the NBA's Cleveland Cavaliers in August 1978, with the Cavs having earlier traded future draft choices to the Bulls for his rights, however Milano's president offered him better terms soon afterwards with the player then settling the contract and returning to Italy.

Playing for Serie A2 side Sav Bergamo in 1982–83, Jura scored 994 points to help the side obtain a historic promotion.

== Personal ==
Jura's mother was of German ancestry while his father was of Czechoslovak ancestry, the latter served as a law enforcement officer which led to Jura being nicknamed "Sheriff" (Italian: Sceriffo) in Italy.

He has three children with his wife Janet, Graham, Neely and Dusty, the latter played college basketball for Nebraska-Kearney before a brief professional career.
