= Pallacanestro Petrarca Padova =

- Leagues: Serie C
- Founded: 1934
- History: Petrarca Padova (1934-2001); Patavium Petrarca (2001-2004); Pallacanestro Petrarca Padova (2004-2011, 2014-present); Gruppo Petrarca Basket (2011-2013); Petrarca Armistizio Patavium (2013-2014)
- Arena: Cà Rasi
- Location: Padua, Veneto, Italy
- Team colors: White and Black
- President: Piermario Liviero
- Head coach: Claudio Corà
- Website: pataviumpetrarca.it
| Home | Away |

Pallacanestro Petrarca Padova, is an Italian amateur basketball club based in Padua, Veneto. It plays in the fourth division Serie C as of the 2015–16 season.

== History ==
The club played in the first division Serie A from 1959 to 1969 and 1971 to 1973, taking part in the second division Serie A2 from 1993 to 1997.

In July 2015, Petrarca Padova combined with Pro Pace Pallacanestro Mortise to form a new club.

== Notable players ==
- (Italy) Renzo Bariviera
- (The Bahamas) Dexter Cambridge
- (Italy) Roberto Chiacig
- (United States) John Fox
- (United States) Chad Gillaspy
- (Socialist Federal Republic of Yugoslavia) Radivoj Korać
- (United States) Doug Moe
- (Italy) Denis Marconato
- (United States) Darren Morningstar

== Head coaches ==
- (Socialist Federal Republic of Yugoslavia) Aleksandar Nikolić
- (Czechoslovakia) Ivan Mrázek

== See also ==
- Fondazione Unione Sportiva Petrarca
