= Aldo Ossola =

Italian basketball player

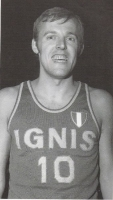
- Ossola, weraing the #10 jersey of Varese

Personal information
- Born: 13 March 1945 (age 81) Varese, Italy
- Listed height: 6 ft 3.75 in (1.92 m)
- Listed weight: 203 lb (92 kg)

Career information
- Playing career: 1962–1980
- Position: Point guard
- Number: 10

Career history
- 1962–1964: Robur Varese
- 1964–1965: Varese
- 1965–1968: Milano 1958
- 1968–1980: Varese

Career highlights
- 2× FIBA Intercontinental Cup champion (1970, 1973); 5× EuroLeague champion (1970, 1972, 1973, 1975, 1976); 50 Greatest EuroLeague Contributors (2008); 101 Greats of European Basketball (2018); FIBA European Cup Winners' Cup champion (1980); 7× Italian League champion (1969–1971, 1973, 1974, 1977, 1978); 4× Italian Cup winner (1969–1971, 1973); Italian Basketball Hall of Fame (2008)
Medals
Men's basketball
Representing Italy
Mediterranean Games
Silver medal – second place	1967 Tunisia
European Championship for Juniors
Bronze medal – third place	1964 Italy	Italy Under-19

Aldo Ossola (born 13 March 1945) is an Italian former basketball player. During his playing career, at a height of 1.92 m (6'3 3/4"), he was nicknamed "Von Karajan", due to being a point guard with a great ability to direct the offensive rhythm and game tempo for his teams. On 3 February 2008, Ossola was chosen as one of the 50 Greatest EuroLeague Contributors, over the previous half-century, by the EuroLeague Basketball Experts Committee. In 2008, he was also inducted into the Italian Basketball Hall of Fame. In 2018, he was named one of the 101 Greats of European Basketball.

== Club career ==
Ossola began his club playing career with the Italian League club Robur Varese, in 1962. He spent the 1964–65 season with the Italian League club Varese. He then played with the Italian League club Milano 1958, from 1965 to 1968. He returned Varese for the 1968–69 season, and he would go on to become a part of the club's legendary 1970s Ignis Varese era teams.

With Varese, Ossola won seven Italian League championships, in the years 1969, 1970, 1971, 1973, 1974, 1977, and 1978. He also won four Italian Cup titles with the club, in the years 1969, 1970, 1971, and 1973. He was also a four-time Italian League finalist, in the years 1965, 1972, 1975, and 1976, and an Italian Cup finalist in 1972 with the same club.

While with Varese, Ossola also won five European-wide top-tier level FIBA European Champions Cup (EuroLeague) championships, in the years 1970, 1972, 1973, 1975, and 1976. With Varese, he played in a total of ten consecutive EuroLeague Finals, in the years 1970, 1971, 1972, 1973, 1974, 1975, 1976, 1977, 1978, and 1979, a record that is in all likelihood, almost impossible to be broken.

As a member of Varese, Ossola also won two FIBA Intercontinental Cup championships, as he won both the 1970 FIBA Intercontinental Cup and the 1973 FIBA Intercontinental Cup. In addition to that, he was also a three-time FIBA Intercontinental Cup finalist (1974, 1976, and 1977). Ossola finished his career with Varese, by winning the European-wide second tier level FIBA European Cup Winners' Cup championship in the 1979–80 season.

== National team career ==
Ossola was a member of the junior national teams of Italy. With Italy's junior national team, he won a bronze medal at the 1964 FIBA European Championship for Juniors.

Ossola was also a member of the senior men's Italian national team. With Italy's senior national team, he won a silver medal at the 1967 Mediterranean Games. He also played with Italy at the 1969 FIBA EuroBasket.

== Personal life ==
Ossola's older brother, Luigi Ossola, played football professionally, in Italy's top-tier level Serie A. While another older half-brother of his, Franco Ossola, was one of the leading scorers of all-time with the Italian club Torino FC.

== Awards and accomplishments ==
- 7× Italian League Champion: (1969, 1970, 1971, 1973, 1974, 1977, 1978)
- 4× Italian League Finalist: (1965, 1972, 1975, 1976)
- 4× Italian Cup Winner: (1969, 1970, 1971, 1973)
- Italian Cup Finalist: (1972)
- 5× FIBA European Champions Cup (EuroLeague) Champion: (1970, 1972, 1973, 1975, 1976)
- 5× FIBA European Champions Cup (EuroLeague) Finalist: (1971, 1974, 1977, 1978, 1979)
- 2× FIBA Intercontinental Cup Champion: (1970, 1973)
- 3× FIBA Intercontinental Cup Finalist: (1974, 1976, 1977)
- FIBA European Cup Winners' Cup (Saporta Cup) Champion: (1980)
- 50 Greatest EuroLeague Contributors: (2008)
- Italian Basketball Hall of Fame: (2008)
- 101 Greats of European Basketball: (2018)
