= Tony Gennari =

Italian-American basketball player (1942–2019)

Personal information
- Born: 9 September 1942 Buffalo, New York
- Died: 22 May 2019 (aged 76) Hopewell, New Jersey
- Listed height: 6 ft 3 in (1.91 m)
- Listed weight: 195 lb (88 kg)

Career information
- High school: Trenton Catholic Academy (Trenton, New Jersey)
- College: Canisius (1961–1964)
- NBA draft: 1964: 5th round, 35th overall pick
- Drafted by: New York Knicks
- Playing career: 1964–1976
- Position: Point guard / shooting guard
- Number: 12, 15

Career history
- 1964–1966: Varese
- 1967–1969: Libertas Forlì
- 1969–1971: Milano 1958
- 1971–1972: Varese
- 1972–1973: Reyer Venezia
- 1973–1976: AMG Sebastiani Rieti

Career highlights
- FIBA Intercontinental Cup champion (1966); FIBA Intercontinental Cup Finals Top Scorer (1967); EuroLeague champion (1972)
- Stats at Basketball Reference

Anthony Michael Gennari (alternate name: Antonio; 9 September 1942 – 22 May 2019) was an Italian-American former professional basketball player. At a height of 1.91 m (6 ft 3 in) tall, he played at the point guard and shooting guard positions.

== College career ==
Gennari played college basketball at Canisius College, where he played with the Golden Griffins, from 1960 to 1964. During his college career, he averaged 14.3 points and 5.7 rebounds per game. As a senior, he averaged 19.0 points and 6.9 rebounds per game. He was inducted into the school's hall of fame in 1991.

== Club career ==
After his college career, Gennari was selected by the New York Knicks in the 5th round of the 1964 NBA draft, with the 35th overall pick. However, he never played in the NBA. During his pro club career, Gennari won the 1966 edition of the FIBA Intercontinental Cup, and the 1971–72 season championship of the FIBA European Champions Cup (EuroLeague).
