= 1972–73 FIBA European Champions Cup =

- League: FIBA European Champions Cup
- Sport: Basketball

Final
- Champions: (Italy) Ignis Varese (3rd title)
- Runners-up: (Soviet Union) CSKA Moscow

FIBA European Champions Cup seasons
- ← 1971–72 1973–74 →

The 1972–73 FIBA European Champions Cup was the 16th installment of the European top-tier level professional basketball club competition FIBA European Champions Cup (now called EuroLeague). The Final was held at the Country Hall du Sart Tilman, in Liège, Belgium, on March 22, 1973. It was won by Ignis Varese for the second time in a row. They defeated CSKA Moscow in the finals, by a result of 71–66.

== Competition system ==
- 27 teams (European national domestic league champions, plus the then current title holders), playing in a tournament system, played knock-out rounds on a home and away basis. The aggregate score of both games decided the winner.
- The eight teams qualified for the quarterfinals were divided into two groups of four. Every team played against the other three in its group in consecutive home-and-away matches, so that every two of these games counted as a single win or defeat (point difference being a decisive factor there). In case of a tie between two or more teams after the group stage, the following criteria were used: 1) one-to-one games between the teams; 2) basket average; 3) individual wins and defeats.
- The group winners and the runners-up of the Quarterfinal Group Stage qualified for the semifinals. The final was played at a predetermined venue.

== First round ==
Team 1	Agg.	Team 2	1st leg	2nd leg
TuS 04 Leverkusen (West Germany)	160–165	(Italy) Simmenthal Milano	73–75	87–90
Wienerberger (Austria)	137–126	(Turkey) İTÜ	81–68	56–58
Etzella (Luxembourg)	152–160	(England) Epping Avenue	81–91	71–69
Íþróttafélag Reykjavíkur (Iceland)	102–210	(Spain) Real Madrid	65–117	37–93
Alvik (Sweden)	144–190	(Israel) Maccabi Elite Tel Aviv	74–103	70–87
Honvéd (Hungary)	144–169	(Belgium) Bus Fruit Lier	85–77	59–92
FUS Rabat (Morocco)	139–193	(France) ASVEL	65–82	74–111
FC Porto (Portugal)	149–202	(Czechoslovakia) Slavia VŠ Praha	81–93	68–109
Jeunesse Sportivo Alep (Syria)	0–4*	(Albania) Partizani Tirana	0–2	0–2
Levi's Flamingo's (Netherlands)	164–179	(Socialist Federal Republic of Yugoslavia) Crvena zvezda	88–72	74–107
Dinamo București (Romania)	172–132	(Finland) Knorr Stars Honka	95–58	77–74
Academic (Bulgaria)	154–141	(Greece) Panathinaikos	76–57	78–84

*Jeunesse Sportivo Alep withdrew before the first leg and Partizani Tirana received a forfeit (2–0) in both games.

== Second round ==
Team 1	Agg.	Team 2	1st leg	2nd leg
Stade Français Genève (Switzerland)	172–242	(Soviet Union) CSKA Moscow	92–121	80–121
Simmenthal Milano (Italy)	175–156	(Austria) Wienerberger	93–76	82–80
Epping Avenue (England)	109–229	(Spain) Real Madrid	62–119	47–110
Maccabi Elite Tel Aviv (Israel)	162–146	(Belgium) Bus Fruit Lier	97–74	65–72
ASVEL (France)	148–153	(Czechoslovakia) Slavia VŠ Praha	66–63	82–90
Partizani Tirana (Albania)	157–193	(Socialist Federal Republic of Yugoslavia) Crvena zvezda	83–94	74–99
Dinamo București (Romania)	141–133	(Bulgaria) Academic	72–75	69–58

Automatically qualified to the group stage

- (Italy) Ignis Varese (title holder)

== Quarterfinals group stage ==
The quarterfinals were played with a round-robin system, in which every Two Game series (TGS) constituted as one game for the record.

Key to colors
Top two places in each group advance to Semifinals

=== Group A ===
	Team	Pld	Pts	W	L	PF	PA	PD
1.	(Italy) Simmenthal Milano	3	6	3	0	552	512	+40
2.	(Socialist Federal Republic of Yugoslavia) Crvena zvezda	3	5	2	1	521	533	-12
3.	(Spain) Real Madrid	3	4	1	2	485	487	-2
4.	(Israel) Maccabi Elite Tel Aviv	3	3	0	3	550	576	-26

=== Group B ===
	Team	Pld	Pts	W	L	PF	PA	PD
1.	(Soviet Union) CSKA Moscow	3	6	3	0	510	453	+57
2.	(Italy) Ignis Varese	3	5	2	1	503	475	+28
3.	(Romania) Dinamo București	3	4	1	2	469	505	-36
4.	(Czechoslovakia) Slavia VŠ Praha	3	3	0	3	489	538	-49

== Semifinals ==
Team 1	Agg.	Team 2	1st leg	2nd leg
Simmenthal Milano (Italy)	169–212	(Italy) Ignis Varese	72–97	100–115
Crvena zvezda (Socialist Federal Republic of Yugoslavia)	173–198	(Soviet Union) CSKA Moscow	90–98	83–100

== Final ==
March 22, Country Hall du Sart Tilman, Liège

Team 1	Score	Team 2
Ignis Varese (Italy)	71–66	(Soviet Union) CSKA Moscow

1972–73 FIBA European Champions Cup
Champions

Ignis Varese
3rd Title

== Awards ==
=== FIBA European Champions Cup Finals Top Scorer ===
- (Soviet Union) Sergei Belov ( (Soviet Union) CSKA Moscow)
