= Marino Zanatta =

Italian basketball player

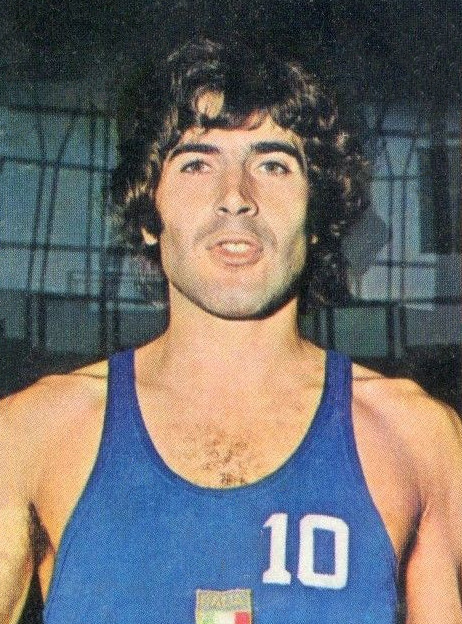
- Zanatta, circa 1975.

Personal information
- Born: 8 February 1947 (age 79) Milan, Italy
- Listed height: 6 ft 6.75 in (2.00 m)
- Listed weight: 208 lb (94 kg)

Career information
- Playing career: 1964–1982
- Position: Shooting guard / small forward

Career history
- 1964–1965: Milano 1958
- 1965–1966: Junior Casale
- 1966–1971: Milano 1958
- 1971–1978: Varese
- 1978–1980: Milano 1958
- 1980–1981: Varese
- 1981–1982: Nuova Vigevano

Career highlights
- FIBA Intercontinental Cup champion (1973); 4× EuroLeague champion (1972, 1973, 1975, 1976); 4× Italian League champion (1973, 1974, 1977, 1978); 4× Italian Cup winner (1973, 1974, 1977, 1978); Italian Basketball Hall of Fame (2014)
Medals
Representing Italy
EuroBasket
Bronze medal – third place	1971 Germany	Team
Bronze medal – third place	1975 Yugoslavia	Team
European U-18 Championship
Bronze medal – third place	1966 Italy	Team

Marino Zanatta (born 8 February 1947) is a retired Italian professional basketball player. In 2014, he was inducted into the Italian Basketball Hall of Fame.

== Professional career ==
Zanatta was a four time EuroLeague champion (1972, 1973, 1975, 1976).

== National team career ==
Zanatta was a part of the senior Italian national basketball teams that won bronze medals at the 1971 EuroBasket, and the 1975 EuroBasket. He also competed at the 1972 Summer Olympic Games, and the 1976 Summer Olympic Games, finishing in fourth and fifth place, respectively.
