= Pallacanestro Milano 1958 =

- Leagues: Serie C Regionale (5th)
- Founded: 1955
- History: Pallacanestro Milano 1958; 1958–present
- Arena: Forza e Coraggio Sports Center, Milan
- Location: Milan, Italy
- Team colors: White and blue
- President: (Italy) Daniele Cattaneo
- Head coach: (Italy) Daniele Cattaneo
- Website: PallacanestroMilano.it

Pallacanestro Milano 1958 is an Italian amateur basketball club based in Milan. Following an uninterrupted presence in the top tier Serie A from 1964 to 1980, the club fell down the divisions and plays in the fifth division amateur Serie C Regionale, Girone B as of the 2014–15 season.

For past club sponsorship names see sponsorship names.

== History ==
Pallacanestro Milano was founded in 1955 by Valentino Milanaccio in order for his son and his friends from the San Gioachimo oratory to play basketball. From 1955 to 1957 it participated in the leagues of the Centro Sportivo Italiano, a Christian sporting organisation, winning the national title in 1956. The 1957–58 season saw the club join the Italian basketball federation and play in the Promozione (the fifth of the six divisions that made up the Italian basketball league system at the time).

Successive promotions saw it reach the first division Serie A by 1964.

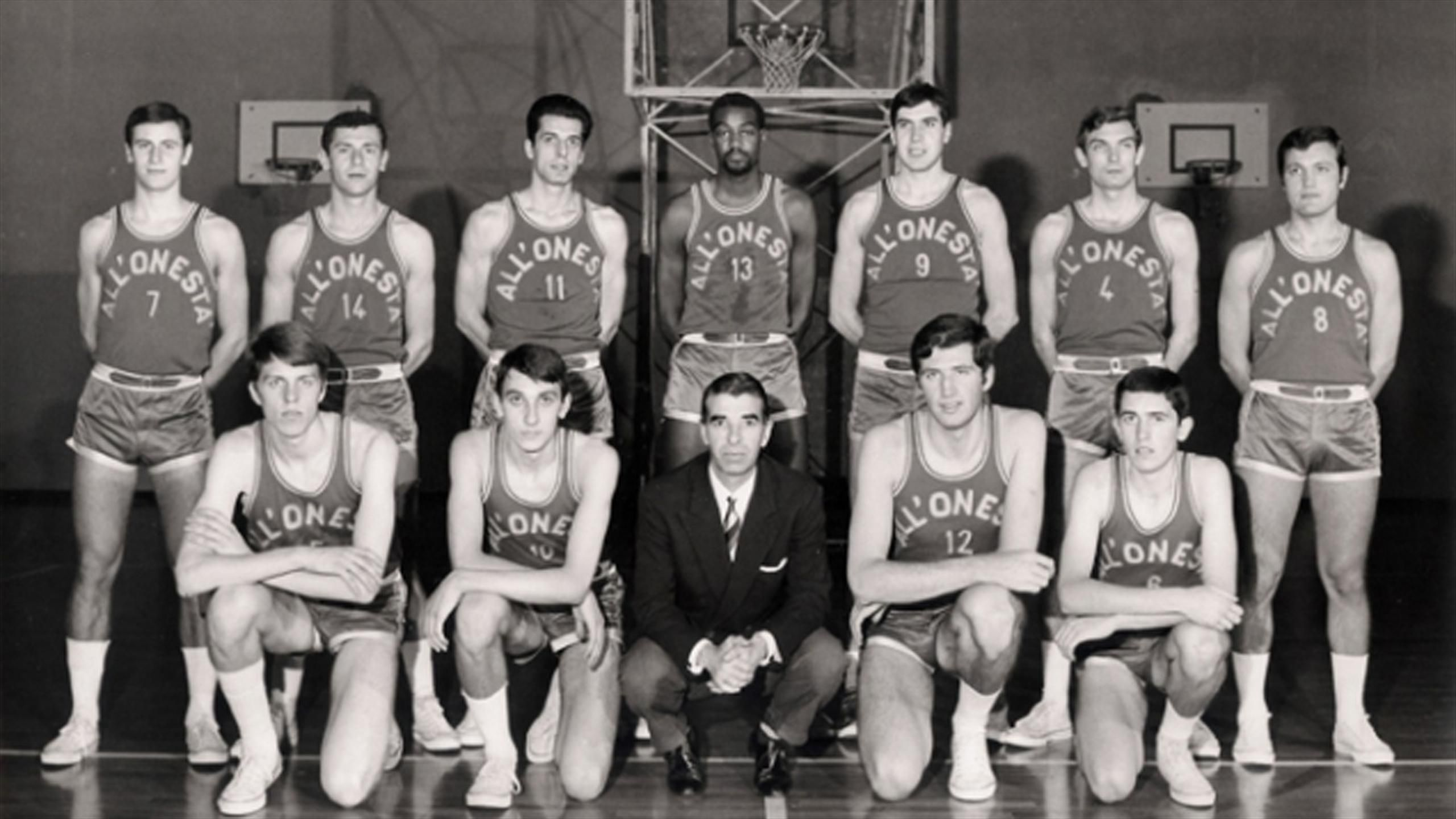
1968–69 All'Onestà Milano, the longest lasting sponsorship in the team's history.

Its heyday started in the second part of the 1960s and lasted through the 1970s where the "Other Milan" played impassioned derbies against the more prestigious Olimpia Milano, with Pallacanestro Milano the only Milan side in the Serie A during the 1976–77 season after Olimpia's relegation.

Pallacanestro Milano would stay in the top division until 1980, after which it would be relegated a number of times and progress down the league pyramid, with the national titles conquered by the youth sides a meager consolation. A new ownership from 1998 managed to rebuild the side from a perilous situation (no youth sector after a breakup, only three players affiliated to the club) with three consecutive playoff appearances but without being able to return the side to the national divisions.

== Notable players ==
1970s

- (Italy) Luigi Serafini 2 seasons: '77-'79
- (United States) Chuck Jura 7 seasons: '72-'79
- (Italy) Massimo Cosmelli 1 season: '70-'71
- (United States) Tony Gennari 1 season: '70-'71

1960s

- (Italy) Enrico Bovone 3 seasons: '68-'71
- (Italy) Marino Zanatta 8 seasons: '64-'65, '66-'71, '78-'89
- (United States) Joe Isaac 6 seasons: '65-'71
- (Italy) Aldo Ossola 3 seasons: '65-'68
- (Italy) Antonio Bulgheroni 3 seasons: '65-'68
- (Italy) Guido Carlo Gatti 5 seasons: '64-'69
- (Hungary) Lajos Tóth 1 season: '64-'65
- (Italy) Sandro Gamba 2 seasons: '63-'65

== Head coaches ==
- (Italy) Roman Forastieri 1961-66
- (United States) Richard Percudani 1966-68
- (Italy) Vittorio Tracuzzi 1968-69
- (Italy) Riccardo Sales 1969-74
- (Italy) Dido Guerrieri 1974-78

== Sponsorship names ==
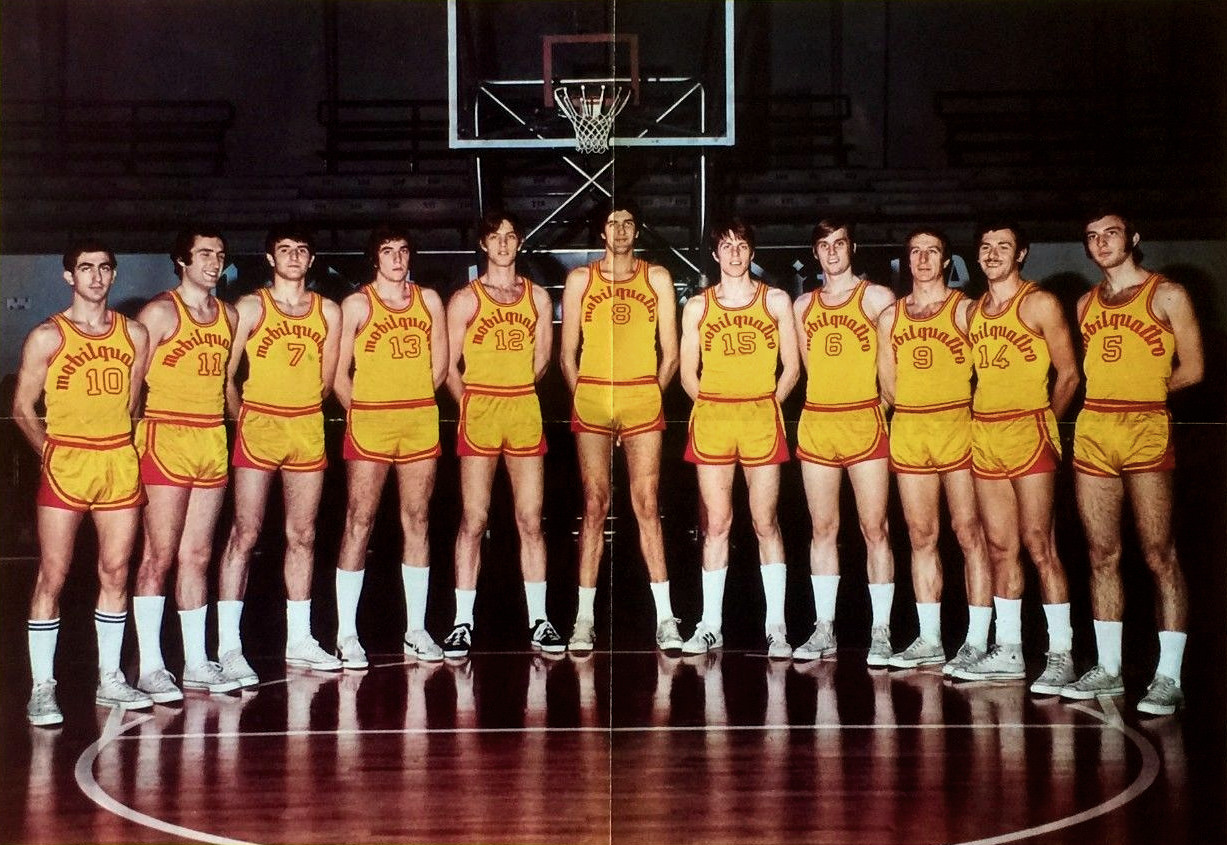
1971–72 Mobilquattro Milano in its original yellow-reds colors

- All'Onestà Milano (1964-1971)
- Mobilquattro Milano (1971-1976)
- Xerox Milano (1976-1979)
- Amaro 18 Isolabella Milano (1979-1980)
- Garelli Milano (1980-1981)
