= Italy men's national basketball team =

Men's national basketball team

Italy
- FIBA ranking: 15 (1 September 2026)
- Joined FIBA: 1932 (co-founders)
- FIBA zone: FIBA Europe
- National federation: FIP
- Coach: Luca Banchi
- Nickname: Gli Azzurri (The Blues)

Olympic Games
- Appearances: 13
- Medals: (silver) Silver: (1980, 2004)

FIBA World Cup
- Appearances: 10
- Medals: None

EuroBasket
- Appearances: 39
- Medals: (gold) Gold: (1983, 1999); (silver) Silver: (1937, 1946, 1991, 1997); (bronze) Bronze: (1971, 1975, 1985, 2003)
Home	Away

First international
- Italy 23–17 France (Milan, Italy; 4 April 1926)

Biggest win
- Italy 128–49 Ireland (Edinburgh, Scotland; 3 May 1976)

Biggest defeat
- Italy 62–108 Croatia (Zaragoza, Spain; 3 July 1992)
Medal record
Olympic Games
Silver medal – second place	1980 Moscow	Team
Silver medal – second place	2004 Athens	Team
EuroBasket
Gold medal – first place	1983 France
Gold medal – first place	1999 France
Silver medal – second place	1937 Latvia
Silver medal – second place	1946 Switzerland
Silver medal – second place	1991 Italy
Silver medal – second place	1997 Spain
Bronze medal – third place	1971 West Germany
Bronze medal – third place	1975 Yugoslavia
Bronze medal – third place	1985 West Germany
Bronze medal – third place	2003 Sweden
Mediterranean Games
Gold medal – first place	1963 Naples	Team
Gold medal – first place	1991 Athens	Team
Gold medal – first place	1993 Languedoc-Roussillon	Team
Gold medal – first place	2005 Almería	Team
Silver medal – second place	1955 Barcelona	Team
Silver medal – second place	1967 Tunis	Team
Silver medal – second place	1983 Casablanca	Team
Silver medal – second place	1997 Bari	Team
Bronze medal – third place	1951 Alexandria	Team
Bronze medal – third place	1975 Algiers	Team
Bronze medal – third place	2001 Tunis	Team

The Italy men's national basketball team (Italian: Nazionale di pallacanestro dell'Italia) represents Italy in international basketball tournaments. They are administered by the Italian Basketball Federation (FIP).

Italy has qualified for 39 EuroBasket tournaments, winning two gold medals (1983, 1999), four silver medals (1937, 1946, 1991, 1997), and four bronze medals (1971, 1975, 1985, 2003) as achievements. While Italy has made ten trips to the World Cup, the closest they have come to winning a medal was in 1970 and 1978, where they finished fourth. In 13 attempts at the Summer Olympics, Italy has earned two silver medals, in 1980 and 2004.

Currently, Italy is ranked 15th in the FIBA World Ranking.

== History ==
=== The Early Years (1926–39) ===
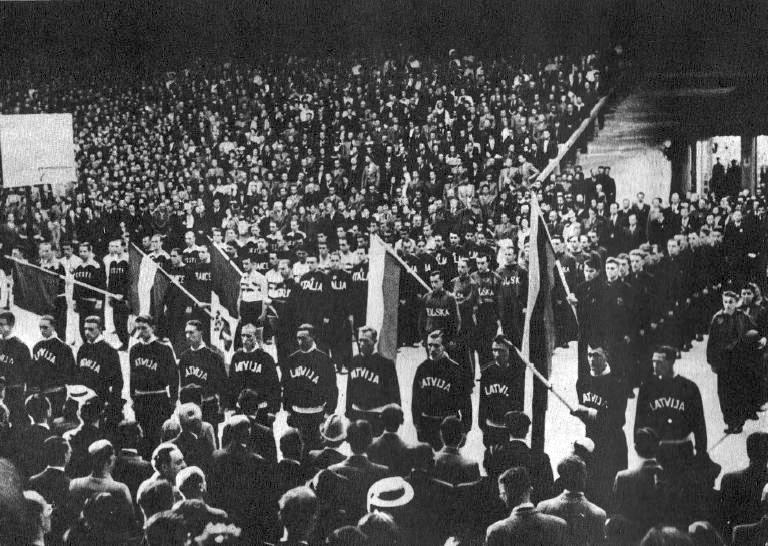
The Italian squad in 1939.

The first match of the Italian national basketball team was played on 4 April 1926 in Milan, and it ended with a victory over France 23–17. Italy's first participation in the Olympic Games was at the 1936 Summer Olympics in Berlin, placing seventh out of twenty-one teams. At the EuroBasket 1937 Italy placed second behind Lithuania, after being beaten by just one point in the final game. The silver medal was repeated at EuroBasket 1946.

=== The Difficult Postwar Period (1946–69) ===
Following the end of World War II, the Azzurri went through difficult times and not only failed to qualify for two Summer Olympics and three consecutive world championships but struggled in Europe as well. This was also reflected at the technical level with the alternation of several head coaches within only a few years. Of special importance was Italy's decision not to compete at the EuroBasket 1949, in order to mourn for the victims of the Superga air disaster. It was the first time that the squad missed a EuroBasket.

In 1957, as Nello Paratore took the head coach position (which he held for 11 years) Italy made only slight improvements from the previous decade.

At the 1960 Summer Olympics in Rome, Italy showed its most impressive performance to this point where it placed fourth, only behind USA, USSR and Brazil. Curiously, the organizational expenses of the Olympics in Rome resulted in the decision not to participate in the EuroBasket 1961.

=== The Decade of Giancarlo Primo (1969–79) ===
In 1969, Giancarlo Primo became Italy's coach, focusing the game strategies on defense. Under his leadership the Italian national team grew stronger, claiming a place among the world's elite. Under Primo, the Azzuri won two European bronze medals and earned two fourth-place finishes at the FIBA World Cup. Further, Italy finished fourth at the 1972 Summer Olympics where it lost the match for third place to Cuba by only one point.
Among the leading players of the national team were the young Meneghin, Marzorati, Villalta and Bariviera.

=== The Successful Years of Gamba (1979–85) ===
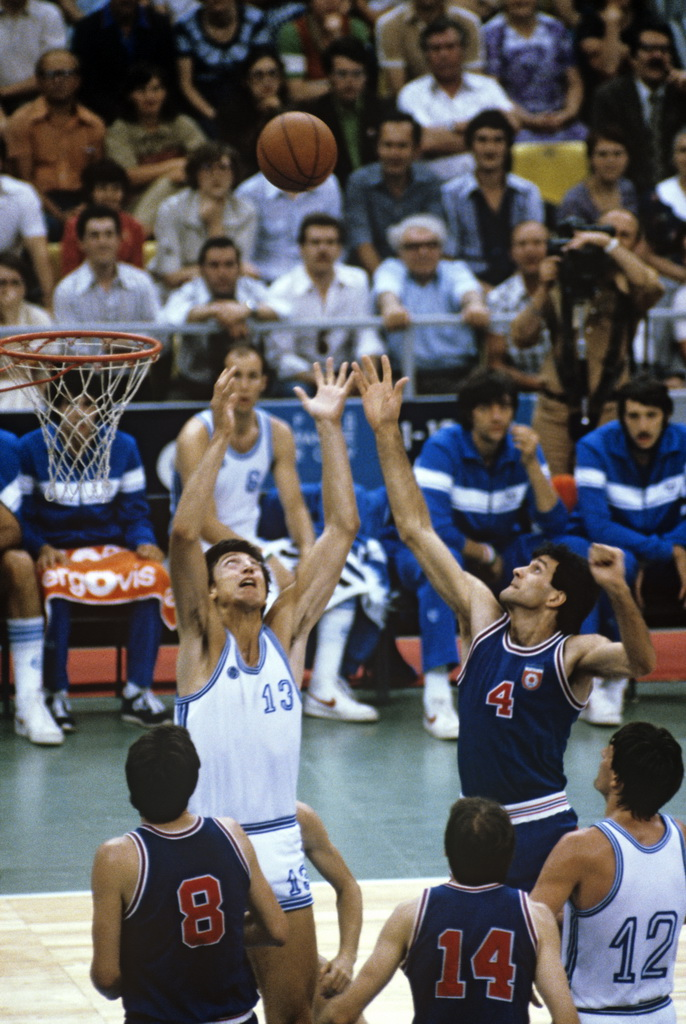
Italy versus Yugoslavia (1980).

In 1979 Sandro Gamba replaced Primo, leading Italy to its biggest triumphs till then: a silver at the 1980 Summer Olympics in Moscow, a gold at EuroBasket 1983 in Nantes, and a bronze at the EuroBasket 1985 in Stuttgart. As in the years before, Meneghin, Marzorati and Villalta were the cornerstones of the team, complemented by players such as Riva and Brunamonti. This episode in time stands out to this day as the most successful in the history of the Italian national team.

=== The National Crisis of 1983: Bianchini and leg-a (1985–92) ===
Following these outstanding accomplishments was another period of crisis, first under Coach Valerio Bianchini (replaced in 1985), and then another six years of modest success where the biggest accomplishment was silver at the EuroBasket 1991 in Rome, which was called to end Ettore Messina, who took over in 1992. In the same year Enrico Vinci stepped down as President of the Italian Basketball Federation after 16 years. The place was taken over by Giovanni Petrucci.

=== The Messina-Tanjevic Era (1992–2001) ===
Ettore Messina became Italy's coach in 1992, winning a silver medal at EuroBasket 1997 in Barcelona. This medal was the main accomplishment of coach Messina, who served the team for five years. Yet, he failed to qualify for the Olympic Games and the World Cup. A great disappointment was suffered at the 1998 World Cup in Athens, when a team with Fučka, Myers and Meneghin was believed to aspire to the podium but only finished sixth.
Bogdan Tanjević replaced Messina and led Italy to the triumph at the EuroBasket 1999, the first gold medal in 16 years. The second gold medal at a European Basketball Championship arrived after beating Spain in the final game. After a ninth place at EuroBasket 2001, held in Turkey, Carlo Recalcati was called to replace Tanjević. Recalcati could count on Italy's top talents Gregor Fučka and Carlton Myers, as well as valuable contributors such as Basile, Abbio and Chiacig.

=== The Recalcati Era (2001–09) ===
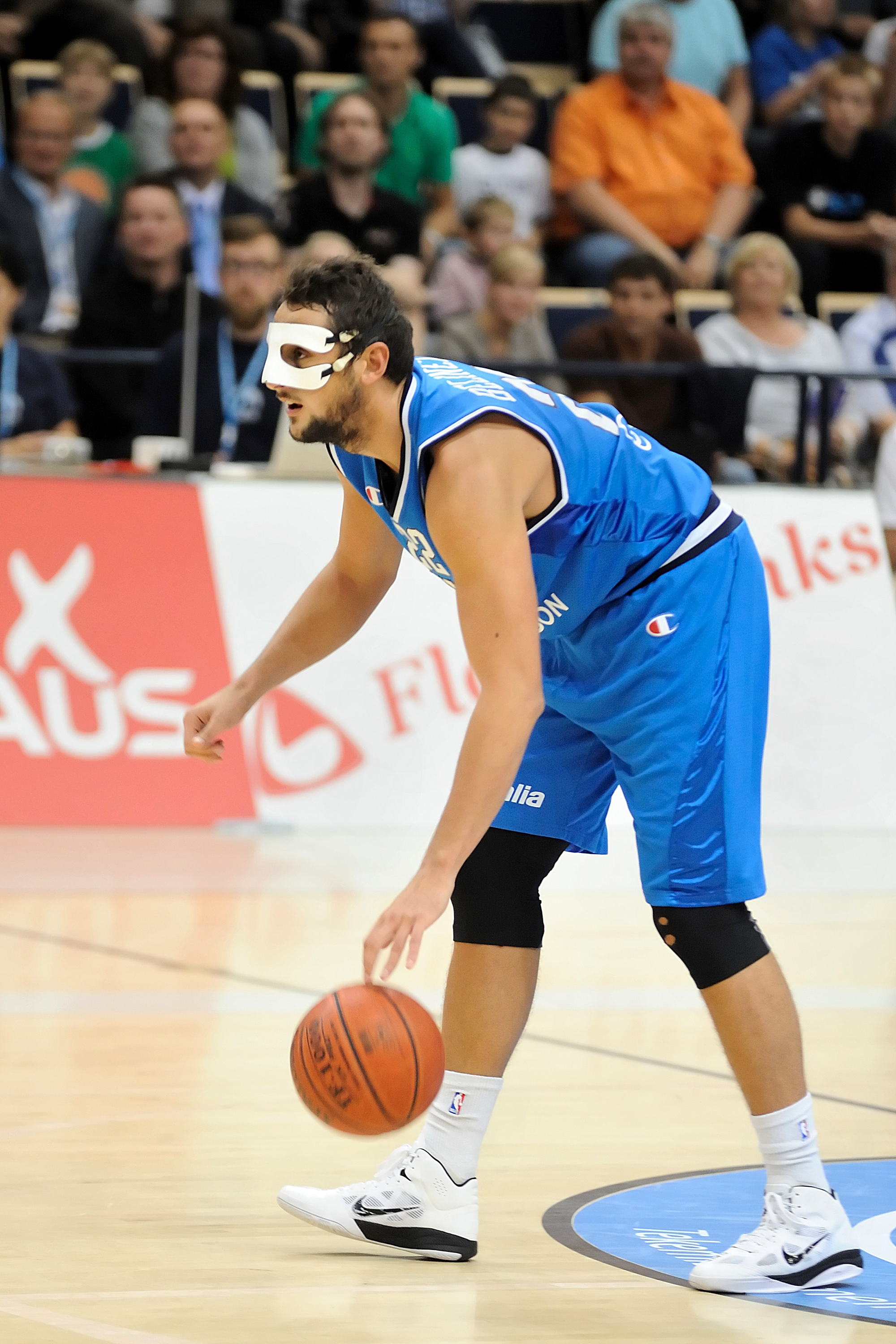
Marco Belinelli during a game

At the EuroBasket 2003, Italy showed a strong performances and defeated Germany and Greece but was later kicked out by Spain in the semifinals. The victory against France in the bronze medal game guaranteed the team's qualification at the 2004 Summer Olympics in Athens. Italy won a silver medal in that event and was stopped only in the final game by Argentina. Most important, this silver seemed to be worth much more than that of the 1980 Olympics in Moscow where several top teams, including the United States and Canada were absent for a boycott.
Since then, the Azzurri experienced years of only skimpy satisfaction: after the Summer Olympics in Greece, the team collected three ninth-place finishes, two at the EuroBasket and one at the 2006 World Cup. Subsequently, the team failed to qualify for the 2008 Beijing Olympics, the EuroBasket 2009 and the 2010 World Cup.
Despite the increasing internationalization of the NBA (especially towards European players) and a steady presence of Italian players, (including the historic first overall pick Andrea Bargnani of the 2006 NBA draft) the national team performed poorly in these years. The reasons for this phenomenon are simple: low contribution of NBA athletes, ageing guards (Massimo Bulleri and Gianluca Basile, who were the highlights of Athens already in their thirties) and the lack of young talent. The reason for the seeming lack of talent were caused by the difficulty that Italian talents had in the national championships Serie A. There, they faced strong competition especially from American and European players. It comes as no coincidence that the team that absolutely dominated in the last years, Montepaschi Siena rarely had Italians in the starting lineup.
During these years, the Serie A went through some changes at the top executives level. Fausto Maifredi (in office since 1999) left and the Federation's first commissioner Dino Meneghin changed the rules by mandating for the commissioner to be the league's president as well.
Meanwhile, Italy failed to qualify for the European Championship in 2009, for the first time since 1961. Curiously, 2009 is the first year where the Azzurri failed to qualify for sports-related reasons. Both absences (1949 and 1961) were due to non-sporting reasons. Following the disappointment CT Recalcati left and was replaced by Simone Pianigiani. Pianigiani coached both the national team and Mens Sana Basket, which for years dominated the Serie A.

=== Coach Pianigiani (2009–2015) ===
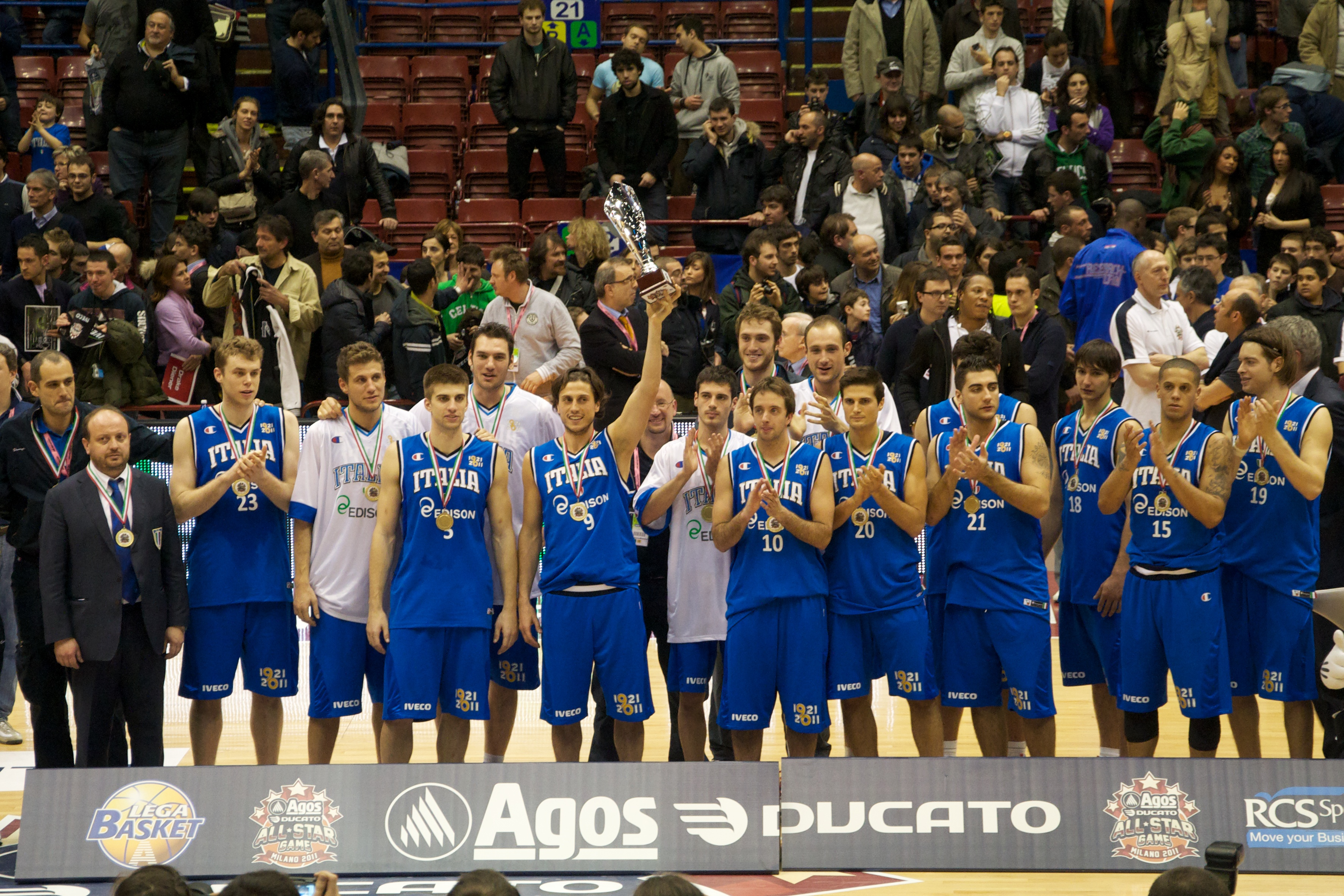
Team Italy in 2011

The team with Coach Pianigiani was able to qualify for the EuroBasket 2011 due to an FIBA decision to expand the tournament.

Later, Coach Pianigiani was able to secure Italy a spot at the EuroBasket 2015.

=== Ettore Messina, the return (2015–2017) ===
From 5 November 2015, Ettore Messina returned to be head coach of the Italian national team simultaneously with his appointment as assistant-coach of the NBA club San Antonio Spurs.

On 9 July 2016, Italy was defeated by Croatia in the Finals of the FIBA World Olympic Qualifying Tournament in Turin, failing the qualification for the Olympics in Rio de Janeiro.

Prior to EuroBasket 2017, Ettore Messina announced he would leave the bench of Italy's national team after the tournament.

At the EuroBasket 2017, Coach Messina and his players were able to lock up third place in Group B of the preliminary phase and set up a Round of 16 date with Finland. There they reached the Quarter-finals, after a supreme performance from Marco Belinelli to lead the Azzurri. However, Italy would fall against Serbia 83–67, failing to set up an semi-finals clash against Russia.

=== Romeo Sacchetti Era (2017–2022) ===
Italy named Romeo Sacchetti new head coach of the national team after the Eurobasket 2017. Sacchetti, who was also coach of Vanoli Cremona, began his new job during the 2019 FIBA World Cup qualifiers.

=== Gianmarco Pozzecco Era (2022–present) ===
Gianmarco Pozzecco took over in 2022, coaching the team to the EuroBasket 2022, co-hosted by Italy. After a 3–2 record in Group C of the preliminary round, Italy upset favoured Serbia in the round of 16. Despite 29 points from reigning NBA MVP Nikola Jokić and coach Pozzecco being ejected, Italy managed to win the game after overtime. The game was deemed as one of the greatest upsets in EuroBasket history, and coach Pozzecco proclaimed the game to be "probably the best match in the history of Italian basketball". In the quarter-finals, Italy lost after overtime to France.

== Competitive record ==
=== FIBA World Cup ===
World Cup					Qualification		
Year	Position	Pld	W	L	Pld	W	L
(Argentina) 1950	Withdrew				5	5	0
(Brazil) 1954	Did not qualify				EuroBasket served as qualifiers		
(Chile) 1959	Did not qualify				EuroBasket served as qualifiers		
(Brazil) 1963	7th	9	2	7	EuroBasket served as qualifiers		
(Uruguay) 1967	9th	8	4	4	EuroBasket served as qualifiers		
(Socialist Federal Republic of Yugoslavia) 1970	4th	9	5	4	EuroBasket served as qualifiers		
(Puerto Rico) 1974	Did not qualify				EuroBasket served as qualifiers		
(Philippines) 1978	4th	10	6	4	EuroBasket served as qualifiers		
(Colombia) 1982	Did not qualify				EuroBasket served as qualifiers		
(Spain) 1986	6th	10	7	3	6	6	0
(Argentina) 1990	9th	8	7	1	EuroBasket served as qualifiers		
(Canada) 1994	Did not qualify				EuroBasket served as qualifiers		
(Greece) 1998	6th	9	5	4	EuroBasket served as qualifiers		
(United States) 2002	Did not qualify				EuroBasket served as qualifiers		
(Japan) 2006	9th	6	4	2	EuroBasket served as qualifiers		
(Turkey) 2010	Did not qualify				EuroBasket served as qualifiers		
(Spain) 2014	Did not qualify				EuroBasket served as qualifiers		
(China) 2019	10th	5	3	2	12	8	4
(Philippines) (Japan) (Indonesia) 2023	8th	8	4	4	10	8	2
(Qatar) 2027	To be determined				To be determined		
(France) 2031	To be determined				To be determined		
Total	10/19	82	47	35	33	27	6

=== Olympic Games ===
Olympic Games					Qualifying		
Year	Position	Pld	W	L	Pld	W	L
(Nazi Germany) 1936	7th	6	4	2			
(United Kingdom) 1948	17th	8	4	4			
(Finland) 1952	17th	4	2	2			
(Australia) 1956	Did not qualify						
(Italy) 1960	4th	8	4	4	Qualified as host		
(Japan) 1964	5th	9	6	3	Direct qualification		
(Mexico) 1968	8th	9	5	4	Direct qualification		
(West Germany) 1972	4th	9	5	4	9	8	1
(Canada) 1976	5th	7	5	2	5	5	0
(Soviet Union) 1980	2nd place, silver medalist(s)	8	4	4	9	8	1
(United States) 1984	5th	8	6	2	Direct qualification		
(South Korea) 1988	Did not qualify				10	7	3
(Spain) 1992	Did not qualify				12	6	6
(United States) 1996	Did not qualify				Did not qualify		
(Australia) 2000	5th	7	4	3	Direct qualification		
(Greece) 2004	2nd place, silver medalist(s)	8	5	3	Direct qualification		
(China) 2008	Did not qualify				Did not qualify		
(United Kingdom) 2012	Did not qualify				Did not qualify		
(Brazil) 2016	Did not qualify				4	3	1
(Japan) 2020	5th	4	2	2	4	4	0
(France) 2024	Did not qualify				3	2	1
(United States) 2028	To be determined				To be determined		
Total	13/21	94	56	39	56	42	14

=== EuroBasket ===
EuroBasket					Qualification		
Year	Position	Pld	W	L	Pld	W	L
(Switzerland) 1935	7th	4	2	2			
(Latvia) 1937	2nd place, silver medalist(s)	5	3	2			
(Lithuania) 1939	6th	7	2	5			
(Switzerland) 1946	2nd place, silver medalist(s)	5	4	1			
(Czechoslovakia) 1947	9th	6	3	3			
(Egypt) 1949	Did not enter						
(France) 1951	5th	9	6	3			
(Soviet Union) 1953	7th	10	3	7			
(Hungary) 1955	6th	10	4	6			
(Bulgaria) 1957	10th	10	7	3			
(Turkey) 1959	10th	8	5	3			
(Socialist Federal Republic of Yugoslavia) 1961	Did not enter						
(Poland) 1963	12th	9	4	5	Direct qualification		
(Soviet Union) 1965	4th	9	5	4	3	3	0
(Finland) 1967	7th	9	5	4	Direct qualification		
(Italy) 1969	6th	7	4	3	Qualified as host		
(West Germany) 1971	3rd place, bronze medalist(s)	7	5	2	4	3	1
(Spain) 1973	5th	7	5	2	Direct qualification		
(Socialist Federal Republic of Yugoslavia) 1975	3rd place, bronze medalist(s)	7	4	3	Direct qualification		
(Belgium) 1977	4th	7	5	2	Direct qualification		
(Italy) 1979	5th	8	4	4	Qualified as host		
(Czechoslovakia) 1981	5th	8	4	4	Direct qualification		
(France) 1983	1st place, gold medalist(s)	7	7	0	Direct qualification		
(West Germany) 1985	3rd place, bronze medalist(s)	8	6	2	Direct qualification		
(Greece) 1987	5th	8	7	1	Direct qualification		
(Socialist Federal Republic of Yugoslavia) 1989	4th	5	2	3	6	5	1
(Italy) 1991	2nd place, silver medalist(s)	5	4	1	6	5	1
(Germany) 1993	9th	6	2	4	Direct qualification		
(Greece) 1995	5th	9	5	4	6	4	2
(Spain) 1997	2nd place, silver medalist(s)	8	7	1	10	9	1
(France) 1999	1st place, gold medalist(s)	9	7	2	10	8	2
(Turkey) 2001	11th	4	2	2	Direct qualification		
(Sweden) 2003	3rd place, bronze medalist(s)	7	4	3	10	8	2
(Serbia and Montenegro) 2005	9th	4	2	2	Direct qualification		
(Spain) 2007	9th	6	2	4	Direct qualification		
(Poland) 2009	Did not qualify				12	5	7
(Lithuania) 2011	17th	5	1	4	8	5	3
(Slovenia) 2013	8th	11	6	5	8	8	0
(France) (Croatia) (Germany) (Latvia) 2015	6th	8	5	3	4	3	1
(Finland) (Israel) (Romania) (Turkey) 2017	7th	7	4	3	7	4	3
(Czech Republic) (Georgia (country)) (Italy) (Germany) 2022	8th	7	4	3	6	4	2
(Cyprus) (Finland) (Poland) (Latvia) 2025	11th	6	4	2	6	4	2
(Estonia) (Greece) (Slovenia) (Spain) 2029	To be determined				To be determined		
Total	39/42	282	165	117	106	78	28

== Results and fixtures ==
Win Loss

=== 2025 ===
27 November 2025 2027 FIBA World Cup qualifiers – 1st round	Italy	76–81	Iceland	Tortona, tItaly
20:00 (UTC+1)	Scoring by quarter: 21–21, 13–17, 20–23, 22–20
	Pts: Casarin 19; Rebs: Tessitori 10; Asts: Tessitori 5	Boxscore	Pts: Friðriksson 29; Rebs: Hlinason 7 Asts: Friðriksson 5	Arena: PalaFerraris; Attendance: 4,711; Referees: Andris Aunkrogers (LAT), Dariusz Zapolski (POL), Ofer Manheim (ISR)

30 November 2025 2027 FIBA World Cup qualifiers – 1st round	Lithuania	81–82	Italy	Klaipėda, Lithuania
18:30 (UTC+2)	Scoring by quarter: 19–16, 20–18, 15–20, 27–28
	Pts: Sargiūnas 18; Rebs: Blaževič 13; Asts: Velička 7	Boxscore	Pts: Procida 24; Rebs: Tessitori 5 Asts: Casarin 5	Arena: Švyturys Arena; Attendance: 5,011; Referees: Yohan Rosso (FRA), Josip Jurčević (CRO), Valentin Oliot (FRA)

=== 2026 ===
27 February 2026 2027 FIBA World Cup qualifiers – 1st round	Great Britain	57–93	Italy	Newcastle, England
19:30 (UTC+0)	Scoring by quarter: 14–32, 13–19, 19–14, 11–28
	Pts: Wheatle 10; Rebs: Hesson 6 Asts: Wheatle 8	Boxscore	Pts: Mannion 19; Rebs: Akele 9 Asts: Spissu 6	Arena: Vertu Motors Arena; Attendance: 2,407; Referees: Martin Vulić (CRO), Fernando Calatrava (ESP), Ivor Matějek (CZE)

2 March 2026 2027 FIBA World Cup qualifiers – 1st round	Italy	84–75	Great Britain	Livorno, Italy
19:30 (UTC+1)	Scoring by quarter: 21–21, 22–17, 21–21, 20–16
	Pts: Niang 23; Rebs: Niang 7 Asts: Spissu 7	Boxscore	Pts: Ellis 19; Rebs: Hesson 10; Asts: Ellis	Arena: PalaLivorno; Attendance: 7,900; Referees: Boris Krejić (SVN), Yener Yılmaz (TUR), Siniša Paša (SRB)

2 July 2026 2027 FIBA World Cup qualifiers – 1st round	Iceland	83–102	Italy	Reykjavík, Iceland
19:45 (UTC+0)	Scoring by quarter: 25–27, 21–31, 16–26, 21–18
	Pts: Hermannsson 22; Rebs: Guðmundsson, Hlinason 6 Asts: Friðriksson 6	Boxscore	Pts: Baldasso 16; Rebs: Emejuru 5 Asts: Spagnolo 7	Arena: Laugardalshöll; Attendance: 1,950; Referees: Yohan Rosso (FRA), Josip Jurčević (CRO), Zafer Yılmaz (TUR)

5 July 2026 2027 FIBA World Cup qualifiers – 1st round	Italy	87–84	Lithuania	Bologna, Italy
20:00 (UTC+2)	Scoring by quarter: 22–25, 18–12, 19–24, 28–23
	Pts: Mannion 27; Rebs: Akele 7 Asts: Mannion 5	Boxscore	Pts: Tubelis 25; Rebs: Tubelis 12; Asts: Brazdeikis 5	Arena: Virtus Arena; Attendance: 4,500; Referees: Antonio Conde (ESP), Valentin Oliot (FRA), Elvis Binders-Čoders (LTU)

28 August 2026 2027 FIBA World Cup qualifiers – 2nd round	Bosnia and Herzegovina	78–76	Italy	Tuzla, Bosnia and Herzegovina
20:00 (UTC+2)	Scoring by quarter: 18–17, 16–10, 24–27, 20–22
	Pts: Nurkić 25; Rebs: Nurkić 14; Asts: Gegić 4	Boxscore	Pts: Fontecchio, Mannion 14; Rebs: Fontecchio, Melli 6 Asts: Mannion 6	Arena: SKPC Mejdan; Attendance: 4,850; Referees: Mārtiņš Kozlovskis (LAT), Michał Proć (POL), Edgard Ceccarelli (FRA)

31 August 2026 2027 FIBA World Cup qualifiers – 2nd round	Italy	64–76	Serbia	Pesaro, Italy
19:30 (UTC+2)	Scoring by quarter: 19–20, 12–20, 23–17, 10–19
	Pts: Mannion 23; Rebs: Melli 7 Asts: Mannion, Melli 4	Boxscore	Pts: Avramović 20; Rebs: Jokić 8 Asts: Gudurić 4	Arena: Vitrifrigo Arena; Attendance: 9,487; Referees: Ariadna Chueca (ESP), Péter Praksch (HUN), Ritvars Helmšteins (LAT)

26 November 2026 2027 FIBA World Cup qualifiers – 2nd round	Italy	vs.	Turkey	Rome, Italy
20:00 (UTC+1)
		Boxscore		Arena: PalaLottomatica

29 November 2026 2027 FIBA World Cup qualifiers – 2nd round	Serbia	vs.	Italy	Belgrade, Serbia
19:00 (UTC+1)
		Boxscore		Arena: Aleksandar Nikolić Hall

=== 2027 ===
26 February 2027 2027 FIBA World Cup qualifiers – 2nd round	Italy	vs.	Bosnia and Herzegovina	Italy
--:-- (UTC+1)
		Boxscore

1 March 2027 2027 FIBA World Cup qualifiers – 2nd round	Turkey	vs.	Italy	Turkey
--:-- (UTC+3)
		Boxscore

== Team ==
=== Current roster ===
Roster for EuroBasket 2025.

Italy men's national basketball team – EuroBasket 2025 roster
Players
Coaches

Pos.	No.	Name	Age – Date of birth	Height	Club	Ctr.
PF	8	Danilo Gallinari	37 – 7 August 1988	2.08 m (6 ft 10 in)	Vaqueros de Bayamón	(Puerto Rico)
PF	9	Nicolò Melli (C)	34 – 26 January 1991	2.06 m (6 ft 9 in)	Fenerbahçe	(Turkey)
F	13	Simone Fontecchio	29 – 5 December 1995	2.03 m (6 ft 8 in)	Miami Heat	(United States)
G	15	Darius Thompson (N)	30 – 4 May 1995	1.92 m (6 ft 4 in)	Valencia	(Spain)
PF	17	Giampaolo Ricci	33 – 27 September 1991	2.02 m (6 ft 8 in)	Olimpia Milano	(Italy)
G	18	Matteo Spagnolo	22 – 10 January 2003	1.93 m (6 ft 4 in)	Saski Baskonia	(Spain)
SF	19	Gabriele Procida	23 – 1 June 2002	1.98 m (6 ft 6 in)	Real Madrid	(Spain)
F	20	Saliou Niang	21 – 14 May 2004	1.99 m (6 ft 6 in)	Virtus Bologna	(Italy)
PG	33	Marco Spissu	30 – 5 February 1995	1.85 m (6 ft 1 in)	Zaragoza	(Spain)
C	35	Mouhamet Diouf	23 – 10 September 2001	2.06 m (6 ft 9 in)	Virtus Bologna	(Italy)
F	45	Nicola Akele	29 – 7 November 1995	2.03 m (6 ft 8 in)	Virtus Bologna	(Italy)
PG	54	Alessandro Pajola	25 – 9 November 1999	1.94 m (6 ft 4 in)	Virtus Bologna	(Italy)

Head coach

- (Italy) Gianmarco Pozzecco

Assistant coach(es)

- (Italy) Edoardo Casalone
- (Italy) Federico Fucà

Legend

- (C) Team captain
- (N) Naturalised player
- Club – describes last
  club before the tournament
- Age – describes age
  on 27 August 2025

=== Depth chart ===
Pos.	Starting 5	Bench 1	Bench 2
C	Mouhamet Diouf	Nicolo Melli
PF	Giampaolo Ricci	Danilo Gallinari
SF	Simone Fontecchio	Gabriele Procida	Nicola Akele
SG	Matteo Spagnolo	Saliou Niang
PG	Alessandro Pajola	Darius Thompson	Marco Spissu

== Head coach history ==
- (Italy) Marco Muggiani – (1926)
- (Italy) Attilio De Filippi – (1935)
- (Italy) Decio Scuri – (1936)
- (Italy) Guido Graziani – (1936–1937)
- (Italy) Decio Scuri – (1939)
- (United States) Elliott Van Zandt – (1947–1951)
- (Italy) Giancarlo Marinelli – (Jan 1952 – Mar 1952)
- (Italy) Amerigo Penzo – (Mar 1952)
- (Italy) Vittorio Tracuzzi – (1952–1953)
- (Italy) Francesco Ferrero – (1954)
- (United States) Jim McGregor – (1954–1956)
- (Italy) Nello Paratore – (1957–1968)
- (Italy) Giancarlo Primo – (1969–1979)
- (Italy) Sandro Gamba – (1979–1985)
- (Italy) Valerio Bianchini – (1985–1987)
- (Italy) Sandro Gamba – (1987–1992)
- (Italy) Ettore Messina – (1992–1997)
- (Serbia and Montenegro) Bogdan Tanjević – (1997–2001)
- (Italy) Carlo Recalcati – (2001–2009)
- (Italy) Simone Pianigiani – (2009–2015)
- (Italy) Ettore Messina – (2015–2017)
- (Italy) Meo Sacchetti – (2017–2022)
- (Italy) Gianmarco Pozzecco – (2022–2025)
- (Italy) Luca Banchi – (2025–present)

== Individual records ==
=== Players with the most caps (games played) ===
- Players in **bold** are still active.

Rank	Player	Caps
1.	Pierluigi Marzorati	277
2.	Dino Meneghin	271
3.	Roberto Brunamonti	254
4.	Giacomo Galanda	215
5.	Gianluca Basile	210
6.	Renzo Bariviera	209
7.	Walter Magnifico	208
8.	Antonello Riva	207
9.	Renato Villalta	207
10.	Luigi Datome	203

=== Players with the most points scored ===
- Players in **bold** are still active.

Rank	Player	Points scored
1.	Antonello Riva	3,784
2.	Dino Meneghin	2,847
3.	Renato Villalta	2,303
4.	Marco Belinelli	2,258
5.	Pierluigi Marzorati	2,223
6.	Renzo Bariviera	2,180
7.	Walter Magnifico	2,064
8.	Gregor Fučka	1,904
9.	Massimo Masini	1,876
10.	Carlton Myers	1,831

=== Highest individual scoring games ===
- 46 Antonello Riva – 29 October 1987 vs. Switzerland
- 45 Lino Cappelletti – 15 September 1956 vs. Sweden
- 41 Antonello Riva – 8 August 1990 vs. Brazil
- 40 Claudio Malagoli – 25 May 1978 vs. Turkey
- 40 Antonello Riva – 10 August 1984 vs. Uruguay
- 39 Simone Fontecchio - 31 August 2025 vs. Bosnia and Herzegovina
- 39 Antonello Riva – 18 July 1986 vs. Israel
- 38 Fabrizio Della Fiori – 16 July 1978 vs. Soviet Union
- 37 Gianfranco Lombardi – 28 September 1963 vs. Spain
- 36 Andrea Bargnani – 2 September 2011 vs. Latvia
- 36 Carlton Myers – 3 December 1997 vs. Sweden

== Past rosters ==
1935 EuroBasket: finished 7th among 10 teams

3 Gino Basso, 4 Bruno Caracoi, 5 Livio Franceschini, 6 Emilio Giassetti, 7 Giancarlo Marinelli, 8 Sergio Paganella, 9 Egidio Premiani, 10 Ezio Varisco (Coach: Attilio De Filippi)

1936 Olympic Games: finished 7th among 21 teams

1 Ambrogio Bessi, 2 Galeazzo Dondi, 3 Livio Franceschini, 4 Emilio Giassetti, 5 Enrico Castelli, 6 Giancarlo Marinelli, 7 Sergio Paganella, 8 Egidio Premiani, 9 Gino Basso, 10 Adolfo Mazzini, 11 Mario Novelli, 12 Michele Pelliccia, 13 Remo Piana (Coach: Decio Scuri)

1937 EuroBasket: finished (silver) among 8 teams

3 Ambrogio Bessi, 4 Galeazzo Dondi, 5 Livio Franceschini, 6 Emilio Giassetti, 7 Giancarlo Marinelli, 8 Camillo Marinone, 9 Sergio Paganella, 10 Mino Pasquini, 11 Michele Pelliccia, 12 Ezio Varisco (Coach: Guido Graziani)

1939 EuroBasket: finished 6th among 8 teams

3 Giancarlo Marinelli, 4 Mino Pasquini, 5 Mario Novelli, 7 Michele Pelliccia, 8 Gelsomino Girotti, 9 Ambrogio Bessi, 10 Giuseppe Bernini, 11 Aldo Tambone, 12 Bruno Renner, 13 Giovanbattista Pellegrini, 14 Venzo Vannini (Coach: Decio Scuri)

1946 EuroBasket: finished (silver) among 10 teams

3 Giancarlo Marinelli, 5 Mario Cattarini, 6 Venzo Vannini, 7 Tullio Pitacco, 8 Armando Fagarazzi, 9 Cesare Rubini, 11 Sergio Stefanini, 12 Valentino Pellarini, 13 Albino Bocciai, 14 Marcello de Nardus, 20 Giuseppe Stefanini (Coach: ?)

1947 EuroBasket: finished 9th among 14 teams

3 Cesare Rubini, 4 Marcello de Nardus, 5 Mario Cattarini, 6 Guido Garlato, 7 Giovanni Miliani, 8 Armando Fagarazzi, 10 Sergio Ferriani, 11 Severino Radici, 12 Valentino Pellarini, 13 Giancarlo Primo, 14 Carlo Cerioni, 15 Vittorio Tracuzzi, 16 Massimo Lucentini, 23 Enrico Garbosi (Coach: Elliott van Zandt)

1948 Olympic Games: finished 17th among 23 teams

3 Giancarlo Marinelli, 4 Gianfranco Bersani, 5 Vittorio Tracuzzi, 6 Giancarlo Primo, 7 Romeo Romanutti, 8 Luigi Rapini, 9 Carlo Cerioni, 10 Sergio Ferriani, 11 Federico Marietti, 12 Valentino Pellarini, 13 Giovanni Nesti, 14 Ezio Mantelli, 15 Renzo Ranuzzi, 33 Sergio Stefanini (Coach: Elliott van Zandt)

1951 EuroBasket: finished 5th among 17 teams

3 Giancarlo Primo, 4 Gianfranco Bersani, 5 Vittorio Tracuzzi, 6 Dino Zucchi, 7 Romeo Romanutti, 8 Giorgio Bongiovanni, 9 Cesare Rubini, 10 Giuseppe Sforza, 11 Federico Marietti, 12 Enrico Pagani, 13 Carlo Cerioni, 14 Mario de Carolis, 15 Enzo Ferretti, 33 Sergio Stefanini (Coach: Elliott van Zandt)

1952 Olympic Games: finished 17th among 23 teams

3 Giorgio Bongiovanni, 4 Carlo Cerioni, 5 Renzo Ranuzzi, 6 Sergio Marelli, 7 Luigi Rapini, 8 Fabio Presca, 9 Enrico Pagani, 10 Sergio Ferriani, 11 Federico Marietti, 12 Dino Zucchi, 13 Sergio Stefanini, 15 Giordano Damiani, 16 Achille Canna (Coach: Vittorio Tracuzzi)

1953 EuroBasket: finished 7th among 17 teams

3 Tonino Zorzi, 4 Carlo Cerioni, 5 Giorgio Bongiovanni, 6 Stelio Posar, 7 Alberto Margheritini, 8 Alessandro Riminucci, 9 Cesare Rubini, 10 Achille Canna, 11 Antonio Calebotta, 12 Nicola Porcelli, 13 Giuseppe Lomazzi, 14 Romano Forastieri, 15 Mario Alesini, 16 Rino di Cera (Coach: Vittorio Tracuzzi)

1955 EuroBasket: finished 6th among 18 teams

3 Giordano Damiani, 4 Adelino Cappelletti, 5 Vinicio Nesti, 6 Adelino Costanzo, 7 Alberto Margheritini, 8 Alessandro Gamba, 9 Silvio Lucev, 10 Alessandro Riminucci, 11 Elvio Bizzaro, 13 Germano Gambini, 14 Stelio Posar, 15 Gianfranco Sardagna, 16 Sergio Macoratti (Coach: Jim McGregor)

1957 EuroBasket: finished 10th among 16 teams

4 Gianni Zagatti, 5 Marcello Motto, 6 Cesare Volpato, 7 Stelio Posar, 8 Alessandro Gamba, 10 Paolo Conti, 11 Rolando Rocchi, 12 Vittorio Pomilio, 13 Sergio Macoratti, 14 Antonio Costanzo, 15 Mario Alesini, 16 Giancarlo Sarti (Coach: Carmine "Nello" Paratore)

1959 EuroBasket: finished 10th among 17 teams

3 Paolo Conti, 4 Cesare Volpato, 5 Silvio Lucev, 6 Gabriele Vianello, 7 Gianfranco Pieri, 8 Enrico de Carli, 9 Mario Alesini, 10 Achille Canna, 11 Antonio Calebotta, 12 Giovanni Gavagnin, 13 Gianfranco Lombardi, 14 Claudio Velluti (Coach: Carmine "Nello" Paratore)

1960 Olympic Games: finished 4th among 16 teams

3 Augusto Giomo, 4 Gabriele Vianello, 5 Sandro Riminucci, 6 Gianfranco Lombardi, 7 Gianfranco Pieri, 8 Alessandro Gamba, 9 Mario Alesini, 10 Achille Canna, 11 Antonio Calebotta, 12 Paolo Vittori, 13 Giovanni Gavagnin, 14 Gianfranco Sardagna (Coach: Carmine "Nello" Paratore)

1963 FIBA World Cup: finished 7th among 13 teams

4 Augusto Giomo, 5 Giusto Pellanera, 6 Gianfranco Lombardi, 7 Giambattista Cescutti, 8 Franco Bertini, 9 Paolo Vittori, 10 Sandro Riminucci, 11 Guido Carlo Gatti, 12 Massimo Masini, 13 Giovanni Gavagnin, 14 Gabriele Vianello, 15 Vittorio dal Pozzo (Coach: Carmine "Nello" Paratore)

1963 EuroBasket: finished 12th among 16 teams

4 Ettore Zuccheri, 5 Giusto Pellanera, 6 Valerio Vatteroni, 7 Massimo Masini, 8 Claudio Velluti, 9 Paolo Vittori, 10 Stefano Albanese, 11 Antonio Frigerio, 12 Alfredo Barlucchi, 13 Sauro Bufalini, 14 Santo Rossi, 15 Massimo Cosmelli (Coach: Carmine "Nello" Paratore)

1964 Olympic Games: finished 5th among 16 teams

4 Augusto Giomo, 5 Giusto Pellanera, 6 Gianfranco Lombardi, 7 Gianfranco Pieri, 8 Franco Bertini, 9 Paolo Vittori, 10 Gianfranco Sardagna, 11 Ottorino Flaborea, 12 Massimo Masini, 13 Sauro Bufalini, 14 Gabriele Vianello, 15 Giovanni Gavagnin (Coach: Carmine "Nello" Paratore)

1965 EuroBasket: finished 4th among 16 teams

4 Giambattista Cescutti, 5 Giusto Pellanera, 6 Gianfranco Lombardi, 7 Massimo Cosmelli, 8 Franco Bertini, 9 Tonino Zorzi, 10 Gabriele Vianello, 11 Guido Carlo Gatti, 12 Massimo Masini, 13 Sauro Bufalini, 14 Sandro Spinetti, 15 Ottorino Flaborea (Coach: Carmine "Nello" Paratore)

1967 FIBA World Cup: finished 9th among 13 teams

4 Massimo Villetti, 5 Giusto Pellanera, 6 Gianfranco Lombardi, 7 Carlo Recalcati, 8 Alberto Merlati, 9 Fernando Fattori, 10 Gianluigi Jessi, 11 Gianfranco Fantin, 12 Giuseppe Rundo, 13 Sauro Bufalini, 14 Massimo Cosmelli, 15 Enrico Bovone (Coach: Carmine "Nello" Paratore)

1967 EuroBasket: finished 7th among 16 teams

4 Livio Paschini, 5 Giulio Iellini, 6 Carlo Recalcati, 7 Alberto Merlati, 8 Gianluigi Jessi, 9 Fernando Fattori, 10 Gabriele Vianello, 11 Gianfranco Fantin, 12 Massimo Masini, 13 Sauro Bufalini, 14 Massimo Cosmelli, 15 Ottorino Flaborea (Coach: Carmine "Nello" Paratore)

1968 Olympic Games: finished 8th among 16 teams

4 Carlo Recalcati, 5 Giusto Pellanera, 6 Gianfranco Lombardi, 7 Enrico Bovone, 8 Massimo Masini, 9 Paolo Vittori, 10 Gabriele Vianello, 11 Guido Carlo Gatti, 12 Ottorino Flaborea, 13 Sauro Bufalini, 14 Massimo Cosmelli, 15 Gianluigi Jessi (Coach: Carmine "Nello" Paratore)

1969 EuroBasket: finished 6th among 12 teams

4 Renzo Bariviera, 5 Aldo Ossola, 6 Carlo Recalcati, 7 Enrico Bovone, 8 Massimo Masini, 9 Paolo Bergonzoni, 10 Marino Zanatta, 11 Dino Meneghin, 12 Giuseppe Brumatti, 13 Ivan Bisson, 14 Massimo Cosmelli, 15 Gianluigi Jessi (Coach: Giancarlo Primo)

1970 FIBA World Cup: finished 4th among 13 teams

4 Eligio de Rossi, 5 Ottorino Flaborea, 6 Carlo Recalcati, 7 Ivan Bisson, 8 Massimo Masini, 9 Renzo Bariviera, 10 Marino Zanatta, 11 Dino Meneghin, 12 Augusto Giomo, 13 Antonio Errico, 14 Massimo Cosmelli, 15 Edoardo Rusconi (Coach: Giancarlo Primo)

1971 EuroBasket: finished (bronze) among 12 teams

4 Giorgio Giomo, 5 Ottorino Flaborea, 6 Carlo Recalcati, 7 Giulio Iellini, 8 Massimo Masini, 9 Renzo Bariviera, 10 Marino Zanatta, 11 Dino Meneghin, 12 Pierluigi Marzorati, 13 Luigi Serafini, 14 Massimo Cosmelli, 15 Ivan Bisson (Coach: Giancarlo Primo)

1972 Olympic Games: finished 4th among 16 teams

4 Ottorino Flaborea, 5 Giuseppe Brumatti, 6 Giorgio Giomo, 7 Mauro Cerioni, 8 Massimo Masini, 9 Renzo Bariviera, 10 Marino Zanatta, 11 Dino Meneghin, 12 Pierluigi Marzorati, 13 Luigi Serafini, 14 Ivan Bisson, 15 Giulio Iellini (Coach: Giancarlo Primo)

1973 EuroBasket: finished 5th among 12 teams

4 Fabrizio della Fiori, 5 Giulio Iellini, 6 Gianni Bertolotti, 7 Mauro Cerioni, 8 Vittorio Ferracini, 9 Renzo Bariviera, 10 Marino Zanatta, 11 Dino Meneghin, 12 Pierluigi Marzorati, 13 Luigi Serafini, 14 Ivan Bisson, 15 Giuseppe Brumatti (Coach: Giancarlo Primo)

1975 EuroBasket: finished (bronze) among 12 teams

4 Lorenzo Carraro, 5 Giulio Iellini, 6 Carlo Recalcati, 7 Vittorio Ferracini, 8 Fabrizio della Fiori, 9 Renzo Bariviera, 10 Marino Zanatta, 11 Dino Meneghin, 12 Pierluigi Marzorati, 13 Renato Villalta, 14 Ivan Bisson, 15 Gianni Bertolotti (Coach: Giancarlo Primo)

1976 Olympic Games: finished 5th among 12 teams

4 Giuseppe Brumatti, 5 Giulio Iellini, 6 Carlo Recalcati, 7 Luciano Vendemini, 8 Fabrizio della Fiori, 9 Renzo Bariviera, 10 Marino Zanatta, 11 Dino Meneghin, 12 Pierluigi Marzorati, 13 Luigi Serafini, 14 Ivan Bisson, 15 Gianni Bertolotti (Coach: Giancarlo Primo)

1977 EuroBasket: finished 4th among 12 teams

4 Carlo Caglieris, 5 Giulio Iellini, 6 Lorenzo Carraro, 7 Renzo Vecchiato, 8 Fabrizio della Fiori, 9 Renzo Bariviera, 10 Marco Bonamico, 11 Dino Meneghin, 12 Vittorio Ferracini, 13 Luigi Serafini, 14 Pierluigi Marzorati, 15 Gianni Bertolotti (Coach: Giancarlo Primo)

1978 FIBA World Cup: finished 4th among 14 teams

4 Carlo Caglieris, 5 Giulio Iellini, 6 Lorenzo Carraro, 7 Vittorio Ferracini, 8 Fabrizio della Fiori, 9 Renzo Bariviera, 10 Marco Bonamico, 11 Dino Meneghin, 12 Renato Villalta, 13 Renzo Vecchiato, 14 Pierluigi Marzorati, 15 Gianni Bertolotti (Coach: Giancarlo Primo)

1979 EuroBasket: finished 5th among 12 teams

4 Carlo Caglieris, 5 Renato Villalta, 6 Lorenzo Carraro, 7 Domenico Zampolini, 8 Enrico Gilardi, 9 Roberto Brunamonti, 10 Marco Bonamico, 11 Dino Meneghin, 12 Vittorio Ferracini, 13 Luigi Serafini, 14 Renzo Vecchiato, 15 Gianni Bertolotti (Coach: Giancarlo Primo)

1980 Olympic Games: finished (silver) among 12 teams

4 Meo Sacchetti, 5 Roberto Brunamonti, 6 Mike Sylvester, 7 Enrico Gilardi, 8 Fabrizio della Fiori, 9 Marco Solfrini, 10 Marco Bonamico, 11 Dino Meneghin, 12 Renato Villalta, 13 Renzo Vecchiato, 14 Pierluigi Marzorati, 15 Pietro Generali (Coach: Sandro Gamba)

1981 EuroBasket: finished 5th among 12 teams

4 Roberto Brunamonti, 6 Mike Sylvester, 7 Enrico Gilardi, 8 Ario Costa, 9 Vittorio Ferracini, 10 Renato Villalta, 11 Dino Meneghin, 12 Domenico Zampolini, 13 Renzo Vecchiato, 14 Pierluigi Marzorati, 15 Pietro Generali, 16 Franco Boselli (Coach: Sandro Gamba)

1983 EuroBasket: finished (gold) among 12 teams

4 Carlo Caglieris, 5 Alberto Tonut, 6 Marco Bonamico, 7 Enrico Gilardi, 8 Ario Costa, 9 Roberto Brunamonti, 10 Renato Villalta, 11 Dino Meneghin, 12 Antonello Riva, 13 Renzo Vecchiato, 14 Pierluigi Marzorati, 15 Romeo Sacchetti (Coach: Sandro Gamba)

1984 Olympic Games: finished 5th among 12 teams

4 Carlo Caglieris, 5 Roberto Premier, 6 Marco Bonamico, 7 Enrico Gilardi, 8 Walter Magnifico, 9 Roberto Brunamonti, 10 Renato Villalta, 11 Dino Meneghin, 12 Antonello Riva, 13 Renzo Vecchiato, 14 Pierluigi Marzorati, 15 Meo Sacchetti (Coach: Sandro Gamba)

1985 EuroBasket: finished (bronze) among 12 teams

4 Giampiero Savio, 5 Beppe Bosa, 6 Ario Costa, 7 Enrico Gilardi, 8 Walter Magnifico, 9 Roberto Brunamonti, 10 Renato Villalta, 11 Augusto Binelli, 12 Roberto Premier, 13 Renzo Vecchiato, 14 Pierluigi Marzorati, 15 Meo Sacchetti (Coach: Sandro Gamba)

1986 FIBA World Cup: finished 6th among 24 teams

4 Roberto Premier, 5 Ario Costa, 6 Walter Magnifico, 7 Enrico Gilardi, 8 Fulvio Polesello, 9 Roberto Brunamonti, 10 Renato Villalta, 11 Augusto Binelli, 12 Antonello Riva, 13 Sandro Dell'Agnello, 14 Pierluigi Marzorati, 15 Meo Sacchetti (Coach: Valerio Bianchini)

1987 EuroBasket: finished 5th among 12 teams

4 Piero Montecchi, 5 Ferdinando Gentile, 6 Walter Magnifico, 7 Alberto Tonut, 8 Massimo Iacopini, 9 Roberto Brunamonti, 10 Renato Villalta, 11 Angelo Gilardi, 12 Antonello Riva, 13 Riccardo Morandotti, 14 Ario Costa, 15 Flavio Carera (Coach: Valerio Bianchini)

1989 EuroBasket: finished 4th among 8 teams

4 Andrea Gracis, 5 Mike D'Antoni, 6 Walter Magnifico, 7 Sandro Dell'Agnello, 8 Beppe Bosa, 9 Roberto Brunamonti, 10 Massimo Iacopini, 11 Augusto Binelli, 12 Antonello Riva, 13 Riccardo Morandotti, 14 Ario Costa, 15 Flavio Carera (Coach: Sandro Gamba)

1990 FIBA World Cup: finished 9th among 16 teams

4 Alberto Rossini, 5 Riccardo Pittis, 6 Andrea Niccolai, 7 Sandro Dell'Agnello, 8 Giuseppe Bosa, 9 Roberto Brunamonti, 10 Gustavo Tolotti, 11 Francesco Vescovi, 12 Antonello Riva, 13 Davide Pessina, 14 Alberto Vianini, 15 Davide Cantarello (Coach: Sandro Gamba)

1991 EuroBasket: finished (silver) among 8 teams

4 Alessandro Fantozzi, 5 Ferdinando Gentile, 6 Walter Magnifico, 7 Sandro Dell'Agnello, 8 Andrea Gracis, 9 Roberto Brunamonti, 10 Roberto Premier, 11 Riccardo Pittis, 12 Antonello Riva, 13 Davide Pessina, 14 Ario Costa, 15 Stefano Rusconi (Coach: Sandro Gamba)

1993 EuroBasket: finished 9th among 16 teams

4 Claudio Coldebella, 5 Ferdinando Gentile, 6 Massimo Iacopini, 7 Alberto Tonut, 8 Beppe Bosa, 9 Riccardo Pittis, 10 Carlton Myers, 11 Paolo Moretti, 12 Alberto Rossini, 13 Alessandro Frosini, 14 Flavio Carera, 15 Stefano Rusconi (Coach: Ettore Messina)

1995 EuroBasket: finished 5th among 14 teams

4 Claudio Coldebella, 5 Ferdinando Gentile, 6 Walter Magnifico, 7 Riccardo Pittis, 8 Vincenzo Esposito, 9 Paolo Conti, 10 Alessandro Abbio, 11 Gregor Fučka, 12 Federico Pieri, 13 Alessandro Frosini, 14 Flavio Carera, 15 Stefano Rusconi (Coach: Ettore Messina)

1997 EuroBasket: finished (silver) among 16 teams

4 Claudio Coldebella, 5 Davide Bonora, 6 Gregor Fučka, 7 Riccardo Pittis, 8 Denis Marconato, 9 Giacomo Galanda, 10 Carlton Myers, 11 Paolo Moretti, 12 Alessandro Abbio, 13 Alessandro Frosini, 14 Flavio Carera, 15 Dan Gay (Coach: Ettore Messina)

1998 FIBA World Cup: finished 6th among 16 teams

4 Davide Bonora, 5 Gianluca Basile, 6 Alessandro De Pol, 7 Gregor Fučka, 8 Gianmarco Pozzecco, 9 Giacomo Galanda, 10 Carlton Myers, 11 Andrea Meneghin, 12 Alessandro Abbio, 13 Alessandro Frosini, 14 Roberto Chiacig, 15 Marcelo Damiao (Coach: Bogdan Tanjević)

1999 EuroBasket: finished (gold) among 16 teams

4 Davide Bonora, 5 Gianluca Basile, 6 Giacomo Galanda, 7 Gregor Fučka (MVP), 8 Denis Marconato, 9 Alessandro De Pol, 10 Carlton Myers, 11 Andrea Meneghin, 12 Alessandro Abbio, 13 Michele Mian, 14 Roberto Chiacig, 15 Marcelo Damiao (Coach: Bogdan Tanjević)

2000 Olympic Games: finished 5th among 12 teams

4 Germán Scarone, 5 Gianluca Basile, 6 Giacomo Galanda, 7 Gregor Fučka, 8 Denis Marconato, 9 Agostino Li Vecchi, 10 Carlton Myers, 11 Andrea Meneghin, 12 Alessandro Abbio, 13 Michele Mian, 14 Roberto Chiacig, 15 Marcelo Damiao (Coach: Bogdan Tanjević)

2001 EuroBasket: finished 9th among 16 teams

4 Nikola Radulović, 5 Gianluca Basile, 6 Giacomo Galanda, 7 Gregor Fučka, 8 Denis Marconato, 9 Alessandro De Pol, 10 Andrea Pecile, 11 Andrea Meneghin, 12 Alex Righetti, 13 Michele Mian, 14 Roberto Chiacig, 15 Andrea Camata (Coach: Bogdan Tanjević)

2003 EuroBasket: finished (bronze) among 16 teams

4 Nikola Radulović, 5 Gianluca Basile, 6 Giacomo Galanda, 7 Matteo Soragna, 8 Denis Marconato, 9 Alessandro De Pol, 10 Alex Righetti, 11 Davide Lamma, 12 Massimo Bulleri, 13 Michele Mian, 14 Roberto Chiacig, 15 Alessandro Cittadini (Coach: Carlo Recalcati)

2004 Olympic Games: finished (silver) among 12 teams

4 Nikola Radulović, 5 Gianluca Basile, 6 Giacomo Galanda (C), 7 Matteo Soragna, 8 Denis Marconato, 9 Gianmarco Pozzecco, 10 Alex Righetti, 11 Rodolfo Rombaldoni, 12 Massimo Bulleri, 13 Michele Mian, 14 Roberto Chiacig, 15 Luca Garri (Coach: Carlo Recalcati)

2005 EuroBasket: finished 10th among 16 teams

4 Dante Calabria, 5 Gianluca Basile, 6 Giacomo Galanda, 7 Matteo Soragna, 8 Denis Marconato, 9 Gianmarco Pozzecco, 10 Alex Righetti, 11 Stefano Mancinelli, 12 Massimo Bulleri, 13 Marco Mordente, 14 Roberto Chiacig, 15 Angelo Gigli (Coach: Carlo Recalcati)

2006 FIBA World Cup: finished 9th among 24 teams

4 Fabio Di Bella, 5 Gianluca Basile, 6 Stefano Mancinelli, 7 Matteo Soragna, 8 Denis Marconato, 9 Marco Belinelli, 10 Andrea Pecile, 11 Andrea Michelori, 12 Mason Rocca, 13 Marco Mordente, 14 Luca Garri, 15 Angelo Gigli (Coach: Carlo Recalcati)

2007 EuroBasket: finished 9th among 16 teams

4 Marco Belinelli, 5 Gianluca Basile, 6 Stefano Mancinelli, 7 Matteo Soragna, 8 Denis Marconato, 9 Marco Mordente, 10 Andrea Bargnani, 11 Andrea Crosariol, 12 Massimo Bulleri, 13 Fabio Di Bella, 14 Luigi Datome, 15 Angelo Gigli (Coach: Carlo Recalcati)

2011 EuroBasket: finished 20th among 24 teams

4 Antonio Maestranzi, 5 Marco Carraretto, 6 Stefano Mancinelli, 7 Andrea Bargnani, 8 Danilo Gallinari, 9 Marco Mordente (C), 10 Andrea Cinciarini, 11 Marco Belinelli, 12 Marco Cusin, 13 Luigi Datome, 14 Andrea Renzi, 15 Daniel Hackett (Coach: Simone Pianigiani)

2013 EuroBasket: finished 8th among 24 teams

4 Pietro Aradori, 5 Alessandro Gentile, 6 Guido Rosselli, 7 Luca Vitali, 8 Giuseppe Poeta, 9 Nicolò Melli, 10 Marco Belinelli, 11 Travis Diener, 12 Marco Cusin, 13 Luigi Datome, 14 Daniele Magro, 15 Andrea Cinciarini (Coach: Simone Pianigiani)

2015 EuroBasket: finished 6th among 24 teams

00 Amedeo Della Valle, 3 Marco Belinelli, 4 Pietro Aradori, 5 Alessandro Gentile, 8 Danilo Gallinari, 9 Andrea Bargnani, 12 Marco Cusin, 13 Luigi Datome (C), 17 Nicolò Melli, 20 Andrea Cinciarini, 23 Daniel Hackett, 33 Achille Polonara (Coach: Simone Pianigiani)

2017 EuroBasket: finished 7th among 24 teams

0 Daniel Hackett, 3 Marco Belinelli, 4 Pietro Aradori, 5 Ariel Filloy, 6 Paul Biligha, 9 Nicolò Melli, 12 Marco Cusin, 20 Andrea Cinciarini, 23 Awudu Abass, 24 Filippo Baldi Rossi, 32 Christian Burns, 70 Luigi Datome (C) (Coach: Ettore Messina)

2019 FIBA World Cup: finished 10th among 32 teams

00 Amedeo Della Valle, 3 Marco Belinelli, 5 Alessandro Gentile, 6 Paul Biligha, 7 Luca Vitali, 8 Danilo Gallinari, 10 Daniel Hackett, 12 Ariel Filloy, 15 Jeff Brooks, 16 Amedeo Tessitori, 23 Awudu Abass, 70 Luigi Datome (C) (Coach: Romeo Sacchetti)

2020 Olympic Games: finished 5th among 12 teams

0 Marco Spissu, 1 Nico Mannion, 7 Stefano Tonut, 8 Danilo Gallinari, 9 Nicolò Melli (C), 13 Simone Fontecchio, 16 Amedeo Tessitori, 17 Giampaolo Ricci, 24 Riccardo Moraschini, 31 Michele Vitali, 33 Achille Polonara, 54 Alessandro Pajola (Coach: Romeo Sacchetti)

2022 EuroBasket: finished 8th among 24 teams

0 Marco Spissu, 3 Nico Mannion, 6 Paul Biligha, 7 Stefano Tonut, 9 Nicolò Melli, 13 Simone Fontecchio, 16 Amedeo Tessitori, 17 Giampaolo Ricci, 25 Tommaso Baldasso, 33 Achille Polonara, 54 Alessandro Pajola, 70 Luigi Datome (C) (Coach: Gianmarco Pozzecco)

2023 FIBA World Cup: finished 8th among 32 teams

0 Marco Spissu, 7 Stefano Tonut, 9 Nicolò Melli, 13 Simone Fontecchio, 16 Amedeo Tessitori, 17 Giampaolo Ricci, 18 Matteo Spagnolo, 25 Tommaso Baldasso, 33 Achille Polonara, 35 Mouhamet Diouf, 40 Luca Severini, 50 Gabriele Procida, 54 Alessandro Pajola,
70 Luigi Datome (C) (Coach: Gianmarco Pozzecco)

2025 EuroBasket: finished 11th among 24 teams

8 Danilo Gallinari, 9 Nicolò Melli, 13 Simone Fontecchio, 15 Darius Thompson, 17 Giampaolo Ricci, 18 Matteo Spagnolo, 19 Gabriele Procida, 20 Saliou Niang, 33 Marco Spissu, 35 Mouhamet Diouf, 45 Nicola Akele, 54 Alessandro Pajola (Coach: Gianmarco Pozzecco)

== Kit ==
=== Manufacturer ===
- 2017–2023: Spalding
- 2023–present: Macron

=== Sponsor ===
- 2015–2021: Barilla
- 2022–present: ITA Airways

== See also ==
- Sport in Italy
- Italy women's national basketball team
- Italy men's national under-20 basketball team
- Italy men's national under-19 basketball team
- Italy men's national under-17 basketball team
- Italy men's national 3x3 team
