= Giomo =

Giomo is an Italian surname. Notable people with the surname include:

- Augusto Giomo (1940–2016), Italian basketball player
- Giorgio Giomo (born 1949), Italian basketball player, brother of Augusto
