= Bovone =

Bovone is an Italian surname. Notable people with the surname include:

- Alberto Bovone (1922–1998), Italian Cardinal of the Roman Catholic Church
- Enrico Bovone (1946–2001), Italian basketball player
