= Guido Gatti =

Guido Gatti may refer to:

- Guido Carlo Gatti (born 1938), Italian basketball player
- Guido M. Gatti (1892–1973), Italian musicologist, editor, administrator, and music critic.
