= Renzo Vecchiato =

Italian basketball player (born 1955)

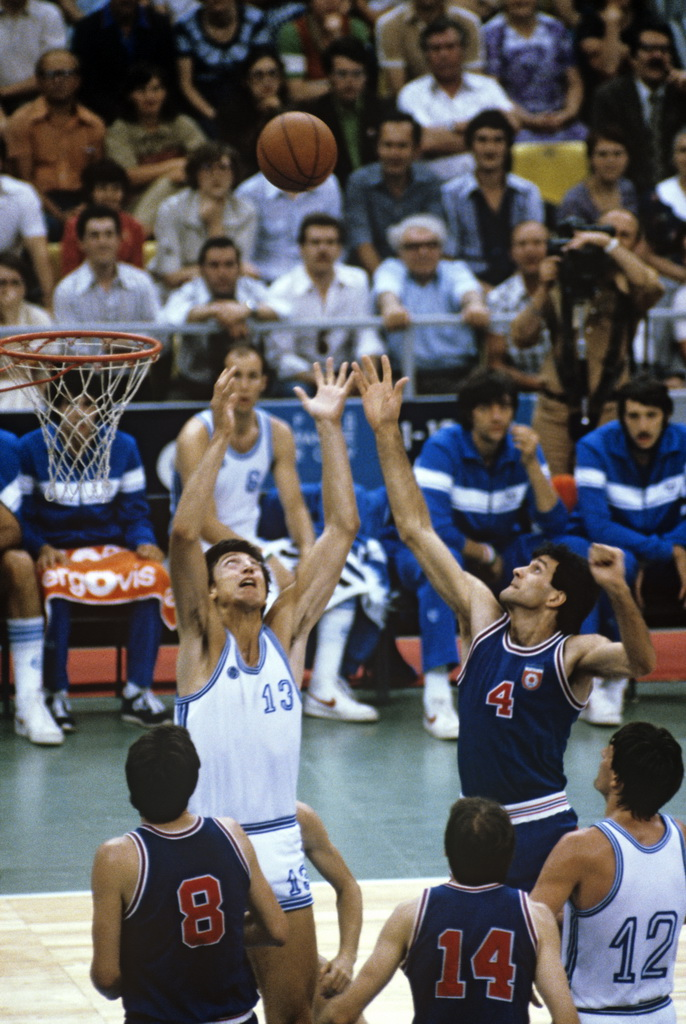
- Renzo Vecchiato (#13 in white), at the 1980 Summer Olympics.

Personal information
- Born: 8 August 1955 (age 71) Trieste, Italy
- Listed height: 6 ft 9.5 in (2.07 m)
- Listed weight: 254 lb (115 kg)

Career information
- Playing career: 1975–1994
- Position: Center
- Number: 11

Career history
- 1975–1976: Blue Star
- 1976–1978: Olimpia Milan
- 1978–1979: Blue Star
- 1979–1982: Basketball Rimini
- 1982–1987: Auxilium Turin
- 1987–1989: VL Pesaro
- 1989–1991: Basketball Florence
- 1991–1992: Fortitudo Bologn
- 1992–1994: Libertas Forlì

Career highlights
- Italian League champion (1988)
Medals
Men's Basketball
Representing Italy (partial support)
Summer Olympic Games
Silver medal – second place	1980 Moscow
Representing Italy
FIBA EuroBasket
Gold medal – first place	1983 France
Bronze medal – third place	1985 West Germany
Mediterranean Games
Silver medal – second place	1983 Casablanca
European U-18 Championship
Silver medal – second place	1972 Yugoslavia	Under-18
European Championship for Cadets
Silver medal – second place	1971 Italy	Under-16

Renzo Vecchiato (born August 8, 1955 in Trieste) is a former professional basketball player and basketball executive from Italy. During his playing career, he played at the center position.

== Professional career ==
Vecchiato debuted in the Italian League with Stella Azzurra Roma. He also played with the Italian clubs: Olimpia Milano, Basket Rimini, Auxilium Torino, VL Pesaro, where he won the Italian League championship in 1988, Basket Florenze, Fortitudo Bologna, Libertas Forlì. He retired from playing pro club basketball in 1994.

== National team career ==
As a member of the senior men's Italian national basketball team, Vecchiato won the silver medal at the 1980 Moscow Summer Olympic Games. With Italy, Vecchiato also won the gold medal at the 1983 FIBA EuroBasket, and the bronze medal at the 1985 FIBA EuroBasket.

Vecchiato also represented Italy at the following tournaments: the 1977 FIBA EuroBasket, the 1978 FIBA World Cup, the 1979 FIBA EuroBasket, the 1980 FIBA European Olympic Qualifying Tournament, the 1981 FIBA EuroBasket, the 1983 Mediterranean Games, and the 1984 Los Angeles Summer Olympic Games.

== Basketball executive career ==
After retiring from his pro club basketball playing career, Vecchiato worked as a basketball executive. Starting in the 1990s, Vecchiato worked as the general manager of the Italian basketball team Rimini, a position he held with the club until 2011. In the 2011–12 season, he was the General Secretary of the Italian basketball club Assi Basket Ostuni. Vecchiato was then the technical director of the Italian basketball club Andrea Costa Imola, for the 2012–13 season.
