= Decio Scuri =

Italian basketball coach and administrator

Decio Scuri (March 18, 1905 in Naples, Italy – April 22, 1980 in Rome, Italy) was an Italian basketball coach and administrator. He coached Italy national basketball team at the 1936 Olympics and 1939 European Championship. He served as the president of the Italian Basketball Federation (1945, 1954-1965) and president of FIBA's Technical Commission (1948-1972). In 2007, he was enshrined as a contributor to the FIBA Hall of Fame.
