= Ario Costa =

Italian basketball player (born 1961)

Victoria Libertas Pesaro
- Title: President
- League: LBA

Personal information
- Born: 26 September 1961 (age 65) Cogorno, Liguria, Italy
- Listed height: 2.11 m (6 ft 11 in)

Career information
- Playing career: 1977–1997
- Position: Center

Career history
- 1977–1984: Basket Brescia
- 1981–1991: Italy
- 1984–1996: Victoria Libertas Pesaro
- 1996–1997: Fabriano Basket

Career highlights
- As player: 2× Italian League champion (1988, 1990); 2× Italian Cup champion (1985, 1992)
Medals
Men's basketball
Representing Italy
EuroBasket
| Gold medal – first place | 1983 France | Italy |
| Bronze medal – third place | 1985 West Germany | Italy |
| Silver medal – second place | 1991 Italy | Italy |
Mediterranean Games
| Silver medal – second place | 1983 Casablanca | Italy |

Ario Costa (born 26 September 1961) is an Italian retired basketball player of Basket Brescia, Victoria Libertas Pesaro and Fabriano Basket, and the current president of Victoria Libertas Pesaro since 2013.

== Professional career ==
=== Playing career ===
Ario Costa started his professional career with Basket Brescia in 1977. After many years in Brescia he went to Scavolini Pesaro where he became immediately a symbol for the team. With Pesaro he won two Italian League Scudetti, the first in 1988 and the other in 1990, and two Italian Cups, in 1985 and 1992.

He retired from the parquet at the end of the 90s.

=== The new role ===
Ario Costa has been engaged as general manager, at first in Pesaro, and later with Fabriano Basket. In 2006 he should go to Scafati, but disagreements with the president of the Campania team, he broke the contract prematurely. Subsequently, he signed a contract as sports director for Lottomatica Roma.

On 18 June 2007 he became the new general manager of Eldo Napoli.

After the ouster of Eldo Napoli from Serie A, at the beginning of the 2008–09 season he became general manager of Juvi Basket Cremona, in Serie C Gold, and later of Triboldi Cremona, in Serie A.

During summer of 2010, Ario Costa became general manager of Basket Brescia Leonessa. In August 2012 he went to Fulgor Libertas Forlì.

In 2013 he returned to his team Victoria Libertas Pesaro as president of the club.

== Honours ==
=== Team ===
- Serie A champion (2): 1988, 1990
- Italian Cup winner (2): 1985, 1992
