= Gianni Bertolotti =

Italian basketball player (born 1950)

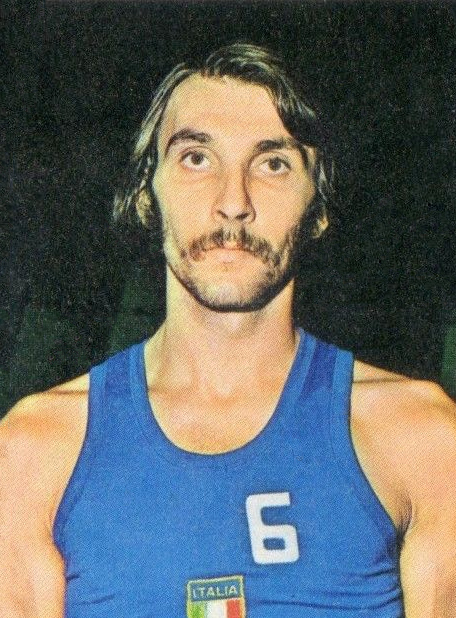
- Bertolotti, in 1975.

Personal information
- Born: 12 February 1950 (age 76) Milan, Italy
- Listed height: 6 ft 6.75 in (2.00 m)
- Listed weight: 200 lb (91 kg)

Career information
- Playing career: 1971–1987
- Position: Small forward

Career history
- 1971–1980: Virtus Bologna
- 1980–1981: Fortitudo Bologna
- 1981–1983: Trieste
- 1983–1984: Virtus Roma
- 1984–1987: Trieste

Career highlights
- EuroLeague champion (1984); FIBA European Selection (1977); FIBA Saporta Cup Finals Top Scorer (1978); 3× Italian League champion (1976, 1979, 1980); Italian Cup winner (1974)
Medals
Representing Italy
EuroBasket
Bronze medal – third place	1975 Yugoslavia	Team
European U-18 Championship
Bronze medal – third place	1968 Spain	Team

Gianni Bertolotti (born 12 February 1950) is a retired Italian professional basketball player.

== Professional career ==
During his club career, Bertolotti was the FIBA Saporta Cup Finals Top Scorer, in 1978.

== National team career ==
As a member of the senior Italian national basketball team, Bertolotti won a bronze medal at the 1975 EuroBasket. He also played at the 1977 EuroBasket, and at the 1976 Summer Olympics.
