= Gianfranco Pieri =

Italian basketball player (1937–2026)

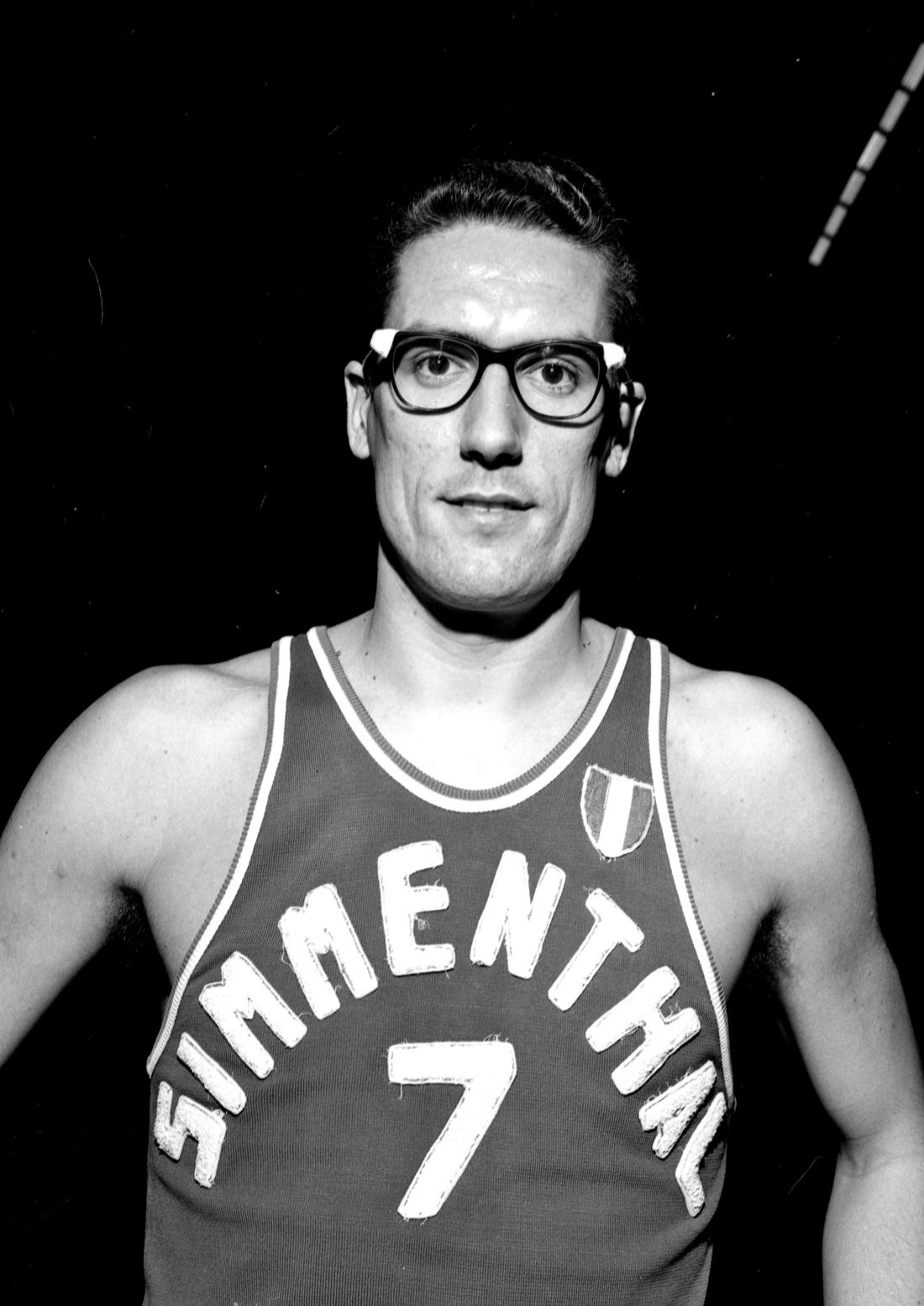
- Pieri with Olimpia Milano in 1962

Personal information
- Born: 6 February 1937 Trieste, Italy
- Died: 14 September 2026 (aged 89)
- Listed height: 6 ft 3 in (1.91 m)
- Listed weight: 180 lb (82 kg)

Career information
- Playing career: 1950–1970
- Position: Point guard

Career history
- 1950–1955: Trieste
- 1955–1968: Olimpia Milano
- 1968–1970: UG Goriziana

Career highlights
- EuroLeague champion (1966); FIBA European Selection (1964); 9× Italian League champion (1957–1960, 1962, 1963, 1965, 1966, 1967); Italian Basketball Hall of Fame (2007)

Gianfranco Pieri (6 February 1937 – 14 September 2026) was an Italian professional basketball player. In 2007, he was inducted into the Italian Basketball Hall of Fame.

== Professional career ==
Pieri was a member of the FIBA European Selection, in 1964. He also won the FIBA European Champions Cup (EuroLeague) 1965–66 season championship.

== National team career ==
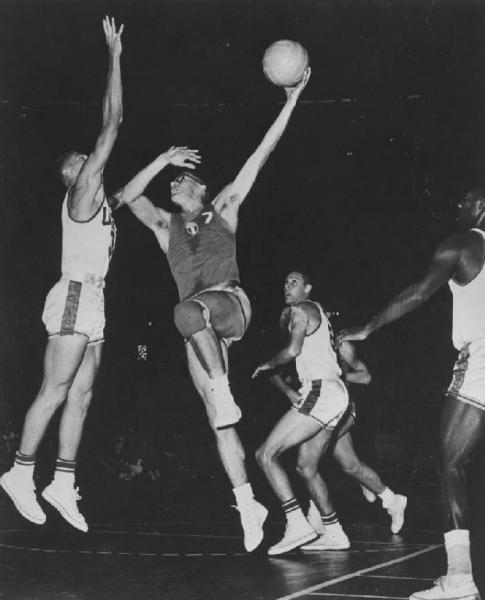
Competing against Jerry West

Pieri was a member of the senior Italian national basketball team that finished fourth and fifth, at the 1960 Summer Olympics, and the 1964 Summer Olympics, respectively.

== Death ==
Pieri died on 14 September 2026, at the age of 89.
