= Gabriele Vianello =

Italian basketball player (1938–2026)

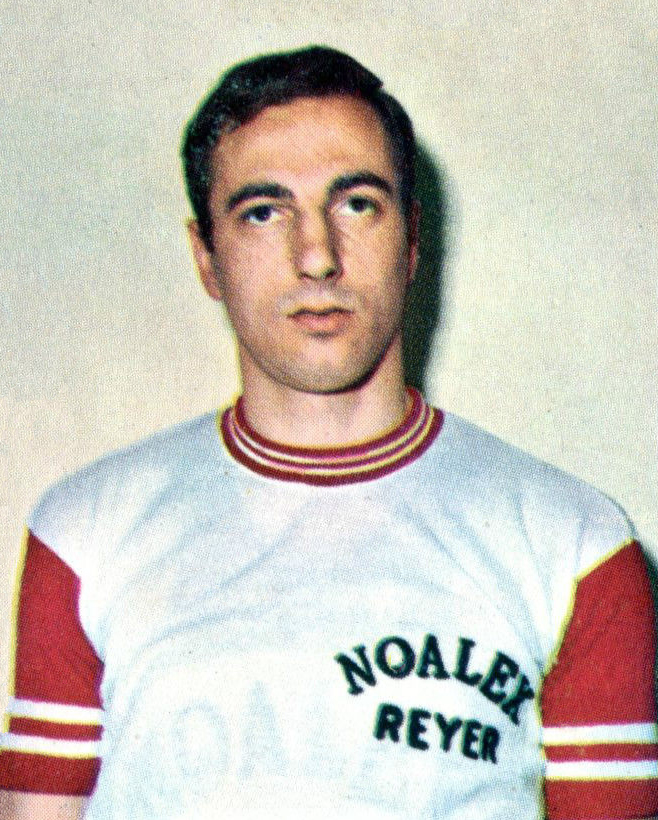
- Vianello, in 1968.

Personal information
- Born: 6 May 1938 Mestre, Italy
- Died: 3 March 2026 (aged 87)
- Listed height: 6 ft 3 in (1.91 m)
- Listed weight: 185 lb (84 kg)

Career information
- Playing career: 1956–1972
- Position: Small forward

Career history
- 1956–1957: Reyer Venezia
- 1957–1959: Motomorini Bologna
- 1959–1962: Varese
- 1962–1967: Olimpia Milano
- 1967–1972: Reyer Venezia

Career highlights
- EuroLeague champion (1966); FIBA European Selection (1964); 5× Italian League champion (1961, 1963, 1965–1967); Italian Basketball Hall of Fame (2011)

Gabriele Vianello (6 May 1938 – 3 March 2026) was an Italian professional basketball player. In 2011, he was inducted into the Italian Basketball Hall of Fame.

== Professional career ==
Vianello was a member of the FIBA European Selection in 1964.

== National team career ==
Vianello was a part of the senior Italy national teams that finished fourth, fifth, and eighth, at the 1960 Summer Olympics, the 1964 Summer Olympics, and the 1968 Summer Olympics, respectively.

== Death ==
Vianello died on 3 March 2026, at the age of 87.
