= Sauro Bufalini =

Italian basketball player (1941–2012)

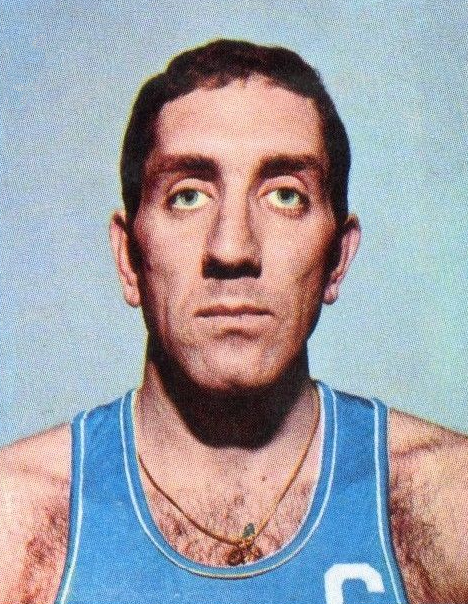
- Bufalini, in 1966.

Personal information
- Born: 28 April 1941 Pisa, Italy
- Died: 1 April 2012 (aged 70) Pisa, Italy
- Listed height: 6 ft 5.75 in (1.97 m)
- Listed weight: 210 lb (95 kg)

Career information
- Playing career: 1958–1977
- Position: Center
- Coaching career: 1975–1977

Career history

Playing
- 1958–1961: Libertas Livorno
- 1961–1968: Varese
- 1968–1971: Partenope
- 1971–1972: Reyer Venezia
- 1975–1977: Pielle Livorno

Coaching
- 1975–1977: Pielle Livorno (player-coach)

Career highlights
- As a player: FIBA Intercontinental Cup champion (1966); 2× FIBA European Selection Team (1965 2×); 2× FIBA Saporta Cup champion (1967, 1970); Italian League champion (1964); Italian Basketball Hall of Fame (2011)
Medals
Men's Basketball
Representing Italy
Mediterranean Games
Gold medal – first place	1963 Naples
Silver medal – second place	1967 Tunis

Sauro Bufalini (28 April 1941 – 1 April 2012) was an Italian professional basketball player and coach. He was inducted into the Italian Basketball Hall of Fame, in 2011.

== Club career ==
As a member of Varese, Bufalini won the championship of the 1966 edition of the FIBA Intercontinental Cup. Bufalini was also a member of the FIBA European Selection Teams, in 1965.

== National team career ==
Bufalini was also a of the senior men's Italian national team. With Italy, he competed at the 1964 Tokyo Summer Olympic Games, where Italy finished in fifth place, and at the 1968 Mexico City Summer Olympic Games, where Italy finished in eighth place, respectively.

He also represented Italy at the following tournaments: the 1963 Mediterranean Games, the 1963 FIBA EuroBasket, the 1965 FIBA EuroBasket, the 1967 FIBA World Cup, the 1967 Mediterranean Games, and the 1967 FIBA EuroBasket.

== Coaching career ==
Before he ended his playing career, Bufalini also worked as a basketball coach. He was the player-coach of the Italian club Pallacanestro Livorno, from 1975 to 1977.
