= Giuseppe Brumatti =

Italian basketball player (1948–2011)

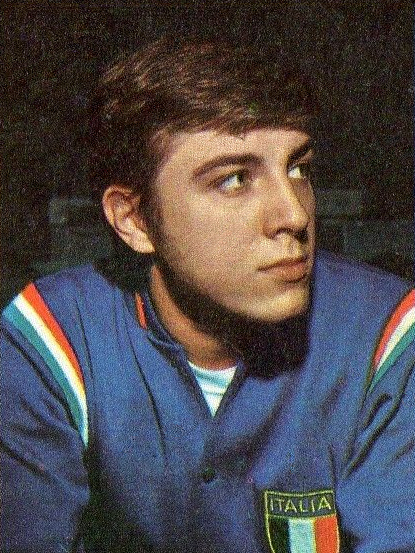
- Brumatti, in 1970.

Personal information
- Born: 19 November 1948 Gorizia, Italy
- Died: 21 January 2011 (aged 62) Gorizia, Italy
- Listed height: 6 ft 2.75 in (1.90 m)
- Listed weight: 195 lb (88 kg)

Career information
- Playing career: 1967–1990
- Position: Shooting guard

Career history
- 1967–1977: Olimpia Milano
- 1977–1983: Auxilium Torino
- 1983–1987: Reggiana
- 1987–1989: Scaligera Verona
- 1989–1990: Mens Sana Siena

Career highlights
- 3× FIBA Saporta Cup champion (1971, 1972, 1976); FIBA Saporta Cup Finals Top Scorer (1976); Italian League champion (1972); Italian Cup winner (1972); Italian Basketball Hall of Fame (2009)

Giuseppe "Pino" Brumatti (19 November 1948 – 21 January 2011) was an Italian professional basketball player. In 2009, he was inducted into the Italian Basketball Hall of Fame.

== Professional career ==
During his club career, Brumatti was the FIBA Saporta Cup Finals Top Scorer, in 1976.

== Italian national team ==
As a member of the senior Italian national basketball team, Brumatti competed at the 1972 Summer Olympics, and at the 1976 Summer Olympics, and finished in fourth and fifth place, respectively.
