= Jim McGregor (basketball) =

Biographical details
- Born: December 30, 1921; Portland, Oregon, U.S.
- Died: July 30, 2013 (aged 91); Bellevue, Washington, U.S.
- Education: USC

Coaching career (HC unless noted)
- 1946–1948: Benson HS
- 1948–1950: USC (assistant)
- 1950–1953: Whitworth
- 1954–1956: Italy National Team
- 1956: Greece National Team
- 1957–1958: Galatasaray
- 1958: Austria National Team
- 1959: Sweden National Team
- 1960: Turkey National Team
- 1961–1963: Peru National Team
- 1965–1966: New Mexico State

Accomplishments and honors

Records
- Inland Empire Coach of the Year (1952)

Jim McGregor (December 30, 1921 – July 30, 2013) was the men's basketball head coach at Whitworth College (1950–53), and New Mexico State (1965–66). He also coached many international teams including Italy (1954–56), Greece, Turkey (1960, for the Olympics), Sweden, Austria, Peru, Morocco, Central Africa, Colombia, and a number of league European league teams. McGregor graduated from Grant High School in Portland, Oregon. He served in the Marines during World War 2. He was also pioneer in promoting American basketball to European teams by taking players that had not been drafted by the NBA and playing exhibition games against European teams. Many players from these teams were signed to contracts to play in Europe - far before this became a commonplace. McGregor received fees when these players signed contracts - and thus an early agent in international basketball. McGregor was inducted into the Grant High School Athletic Hall of Fame in 2011. McGregor died on July 30, 2013.

== Head coaching record ==
Record table
| Season | Team | Overall | Conference | Standing | Postseason |
|---|---|---|---|---|---|
New Mexico State Aggies (Independent) (1965–1966)
| 1965–66 | New Mexico State | 4-22 | | | |
| New Mexico State: | | 4-22 (.154) | | | |
| Total: | | 4-22 (.154) | | | |
National champion Postseason invitational champion Conference regular season champion Conference regular season and conference tournament champion Division regular season champion Division regular season and conference tournament champion Conference tournament champion
