= Giulio Iellini =

Italian basketball player

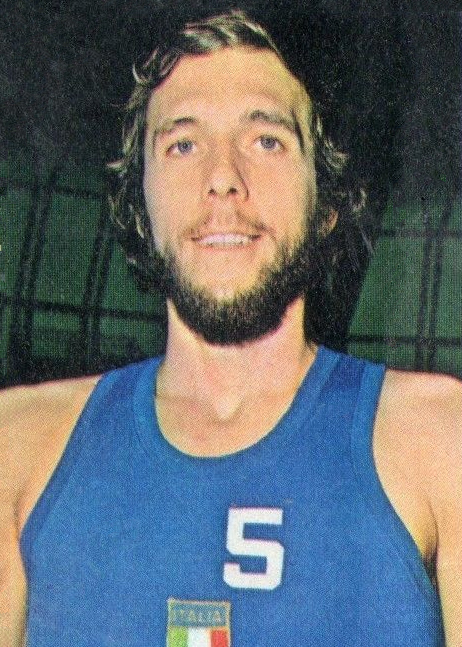
- Iellini, in 1975.

Personal information
- Born: 18 October 1947 (age 79) Trieste, Italy
- Listed height: 6 ft 2.75 in (1.90 m)
- Listed weight: 175 lb (79 kg)

Career information
- Playing career: 1964–1982
- Position: Point guard

Career history
- 1964–1975: Olimpia Milano
- 1975–1977: Varese
- 1977–1981: Nuova Pallacanestro Vigevano
- 1981–1982: Polisportiva S.S. Lazio

Career highlights
- 2× EuroLeague champion (1966, 1976); 2× FIBA Saporta Cup champion (1971, 1972); 5× Italian League champion (1965, 1966, 1967, 1972, 1977); Italian Cup winner (1972); Italian Basketball Hall of Fame (2009)
Medals
Representing Italy
EuroBasket
Bronze medal – third place	1971 Germany	Team
Bronze medal – third place	1975 Yugoslavia	Team
European U-18 Championship
Bronze medal – third place	1966 Italy	Team

Giulio Iellini (born 18 October 1947) is a retired Italian professional basketball player. In 2009, he was inducted into the Italian Basketball Hall of Fame.

== Professional career ==
Iellini won two EuroLeague championships, in 1966 and 1976.

== Italian national team ==
Iellini was a part of the senior Italian national basketball teams that won bronze medals at the 1971 EuroBasket, and the 1975 EuroBasket. He was also on the Italian team that placed fourth at EuroBasket 1977. He also competed at the 1972 Summer Olympic Games, and at the 1976 Summer Olympic Games, and finished in fourth and fifth place, respectively.
