= Marco Bonamico =

Italian basketball player (1957–2025)

Personal information
- Born: 18 January 1957 Genoa, Italy
- Died: 4 August 2025 (aged 68) Bologna, Italy
- Listed height: 6 ft 7 in (2.01 m)
- Listed weight: 220 lb (100 kg)

Career information
- NBA draft: 1979: undrafted
- Playing career: 1975–1995
- Positions: Small forward, power forward

Career history
- 1975–1976: Virtus Bologna
- 1976–1977: Fortitudo Bologna
- 1977–1978: Virtus Bologna
- 1978–1979: Mens Sana Siena
- 1979–1980: Olimpia Milano
- 1980–1986: Virtus Bologna
- 1986–1988: Napoli Basket
- 1988–1989: Virtus Bologna
- 1989–1993: Libertas Forlì
- 1993–1995: Libertas Udine

Career highlights
- 2× Italian League champion (1976, 1984); 2× Italian Cup winner (1984, 1989)
Medals
Men's basketball
Representing Italy
Summer Olympics
Silver medal – second place	1980 Moscow
EuroBasket
Gold medal – first place	1983 France

Marco Bonamico (18 January 1957 – 4 August 2025) was an Italian professional basketball player, announcer, and executive. At a height of 2.01 m (6 ft 7 in) tall, he played at the small forward and power forward positions. During his playing career, his nickname was, "il Marine" ("The Marine").

== Professional career ==
As a member of the Italian A League club Virtus Bologna, Bonamico was the top scorer of the EuroLeague Finals in 1981, with 26 points scored against the Israeli Premier League club Maccabi Tel Aviv, in the championship game.

== National team career ==
With the senior men's Italian national team, Bonamico won a silver medal at the 1980 Moscow Summer Olympic Games. He also won a gold medal at the 1983 FIBA EuroBasket.

Bonamico also represented Italy at the following major FIBA tournaments: the 1977 FIBA EuroBasket, the 1978 FIBA World Championship, the 1979 FIBA EuroBasket, and the 1984 Los Angeles Summer Olympic Games.

== Sports commentator ==
After he retired from playing pro club basketball, Bonamico worked as a television basketball color commentator for the Italian public broadcasting company RAI.

== Basketball executive ==
From 1996 to 2000, Bonamico was the President of GIBA, the Association of Italian Basketball Players. On 19 February 19, 2009, Bonamico was elected the President of Italy's 2nd-tier level professional club basketball competition, the LegaDue.

== Death ==
Bonamico died in Bologna, Italy, on 4 August 2025, at the age of 68.
