= Roberto Premier =

Italian basketball player

Personal information
- Born: 25 January 1958 (age 68) Spresiano, Italy
- Listed height: 6 ft 5.75 in (1.97 m)
- Listed weight: 215 lb (98 kg)

Career information
- NBA draft: 1980: undrafted
- Playing career: 1978–2000
- Position: Shooting guard / small forward
- Coaching career: 2003–2010

Career history

Playing
- 1978–1981: UG Goriziana
- 1981–1989: Olimpia Milano
- 1989–1994: Virtus Roma
- 1994–1995: UG Goriziana
- 1995–1996: Modena
- 1996–1998: Nuova Pallacanestro Vigevano
- 1998–1999: Pallacanestro Petrarca Padova
- 1999–2000: Pallacanestro Pavia

Coaching
- 2003–2005: UG Goriziana
- 2006: Robur Saronno
- 2007–2008: Virtus Civitanova
- 2010: Vis Spilimbergo

Career highlights
- As player: FIBA Intercontinental Cup champion (1987); 2× EuroLeague champion (1987, 1988); FIBA Saporta Cup Finals Top Scorer (1984); 2× FIBA Korać Cup champion (1985, 1992); 5× Italian League champion (1982, 1985–1987, 1989); 2× Italian Cup winner (1986, 1987)
Medals
Representing Italy
EuroBasket
| Bronze medal – third place | 1985 West Germany | Italy |
| Silver medal – second place | 1991 Rome | Italy |

Roberto Premier (born 25 January 1958) is an Italian former professional basketball player and basketball coach. At a height of 1.97 m (6 ft 5 3/4 in) tall, he played at the shooting guard and small forward positions. He was the FIBA Saporta Cup Finals Top Scorer, in 1984.

== Professional career ==
Premier played with Gorizia Pallacanestro (1978–1981), Olimpia Milano (1981–1989), and Pallacanestro Virtus Roma (1989–1994). Premier won 5 Italian League championships (1982, 1985, 1986, 1987, 1989), 2 Italian Cups (1986, 1987), 2 FIBA European Champions Cup (EuroLeague) titles (1987, 1988), 1 FIBA Korać Cup (1985), and 1 FIBA Intercontinental Cup (1987), while playing with Olimpia Milano. While playing with Pallacanestro Virtus Roma, he won the FIBA Korać Cup (1992).

== Italian national team ==
Premier played with the senior Italian national basketball team at the EuroBasket 1985, where he won a bronze medal, at the EuroBasket 1991, where he won a silver medal. He also played at the 1984 Summer Olympic Games, and at the 1986 FIBA World Championship.
