= Giancarlo Marinelli =

Italian basketball player (1915–1987)

Medal record

Representing Italy

Men's basketball

European Championships
Silver medal – second place	1937 Latvia	Team competition

Giancarlo Marinelli (4 December 1915 – 12 May 1987) was an Italian basketball player who competed in the 1936 Summer Olympics and the 1948 Summer Olympics. He was born in Bologna. Marinelli was part of the Italian basketball team, which finished seventh in the Olympic tournament. He played four matches.
