= Michele Mian =

Italian basketball player (born 1973)

Medal record

Representing Italy

Men's basketball

Olympic Games
Silver medal – second place	2004 Athens	Team competition

European Championships
Gold medal – first place	1999 France	Team competition
Bronze medal – third place	2003 Sweden	Team competition

Michele Mian (born 18 July 1973 in Gorizia) is an Italian basketball shooting guard. Mian was born in Gorizia, Italy, and won the silver medal with the Italian men's national team at the 2004 Summer Olympics in Athens, Greece. He also competed for his country at the 2000 Summer Olympics.
