= Franco Bertini =

Italian basketball player (born 1938)

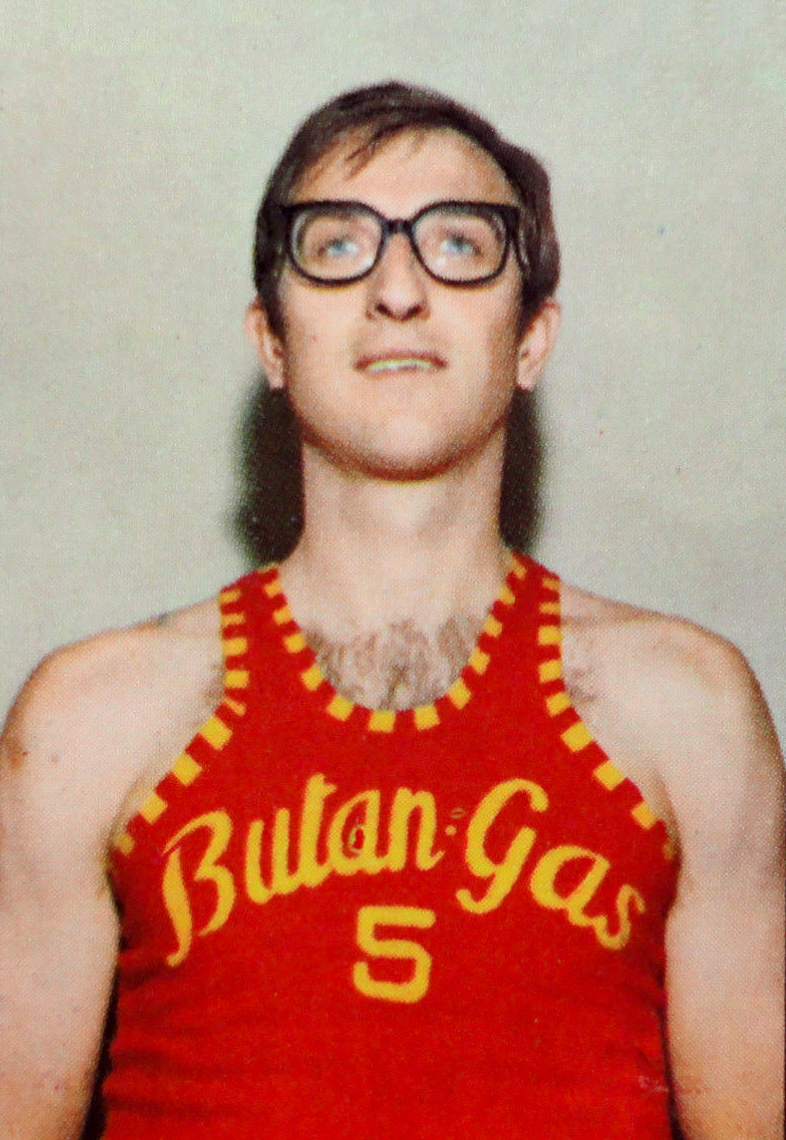
- Bertini, in 1969.

Personal information
- Born: 28 August 1938 (age 88) Pesaro, Italy
- Listed height: 6 ft 0.5 in (1.84 m)
- Listed weight: 165 lb (75 kg)

Career information
- Playing career: 1956–1974
- Position: Point guard

Career history
- 1956–1958: Victoria Pesaro
- 1958–1959: Olimpia Milano
- 1959–1961: Victoria Pesaro
- 1961–1963: Pallacanestro Varese
- 1963–1965: S.C. Gira
- 1965–1974: Victoria Libertas Pesaro

Career highlights
- Italian League champion (1959); Italian Basketball Hall of Fame (2012)

Gianfranco "Franco" Bertini (born 28 August 1938) is a retired Italian professional basketball player. In 2012, he was inducted into the Italian Basketball Hall of Fame.

== Club career ==
During his pro club career, Bertini won the Italian League championship with Olimpia Milano, in 1959.

== National team career ==
Bertini competed with the senior Italian national basketball team at the 1964 Summer Olympic Games, where Italy finished in fifth place. He also played at the 1963 FIBA World Championship, and at the 1965 EuroBasket.
