= Mike Pelliccia =

Italian basketball player (1910–??)

Personal information
- Born: 27 January 1910 New York City, New York, U.S.

Mike Pelliccia (born 27 January 1910, date of death unknown) was an Italian basketball player. He competed in the 1936 Summer Olympics.
