= Mario Alesini =

Italian basketball player (1931–2001)

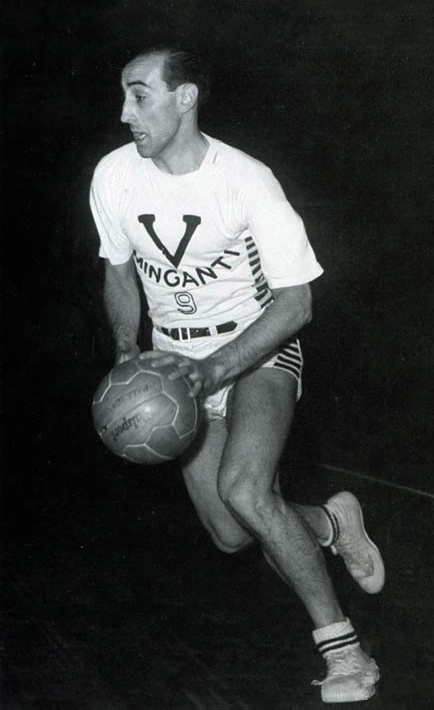

Personal information
- Born: 17 December 1931 Varese, Italy
- Died: 2 August 2001 (aged 69) San Lazzaro di Savena, Italy
- Height: 1.90 m (6 ft 3 in)
- Weight: 89 kg (196 lb)

Sport
- Sport: Basketball
- Club: Virtus Bologna

Mario Alesini (17 December 1931 – 2 August 2001) was an Italian basketball player. He was part of the Italian team that finished fourth at the 1960 Summer Olympics.
