= Federico Marietti =

Italian basketball player (1925–1995)

Personal information
- Nationality: Italian
- Born: 9 December 1925 Rome, Italy
- Died: 9 July 1995 (aged 69) Rome, Italy

Sport
- Sport: Basketball

Federico Marietti (9 December 1925 – 9 July 1995) was an Italian basketball player. He competed in the men's tournament at the 1948 Summer Olympics and the 1952 Summer Olympics. During his four-year career, he won 39 international caps and scored 139 points.
