= Gianfranco Bersani =

Italian basketball player (1919–1965)

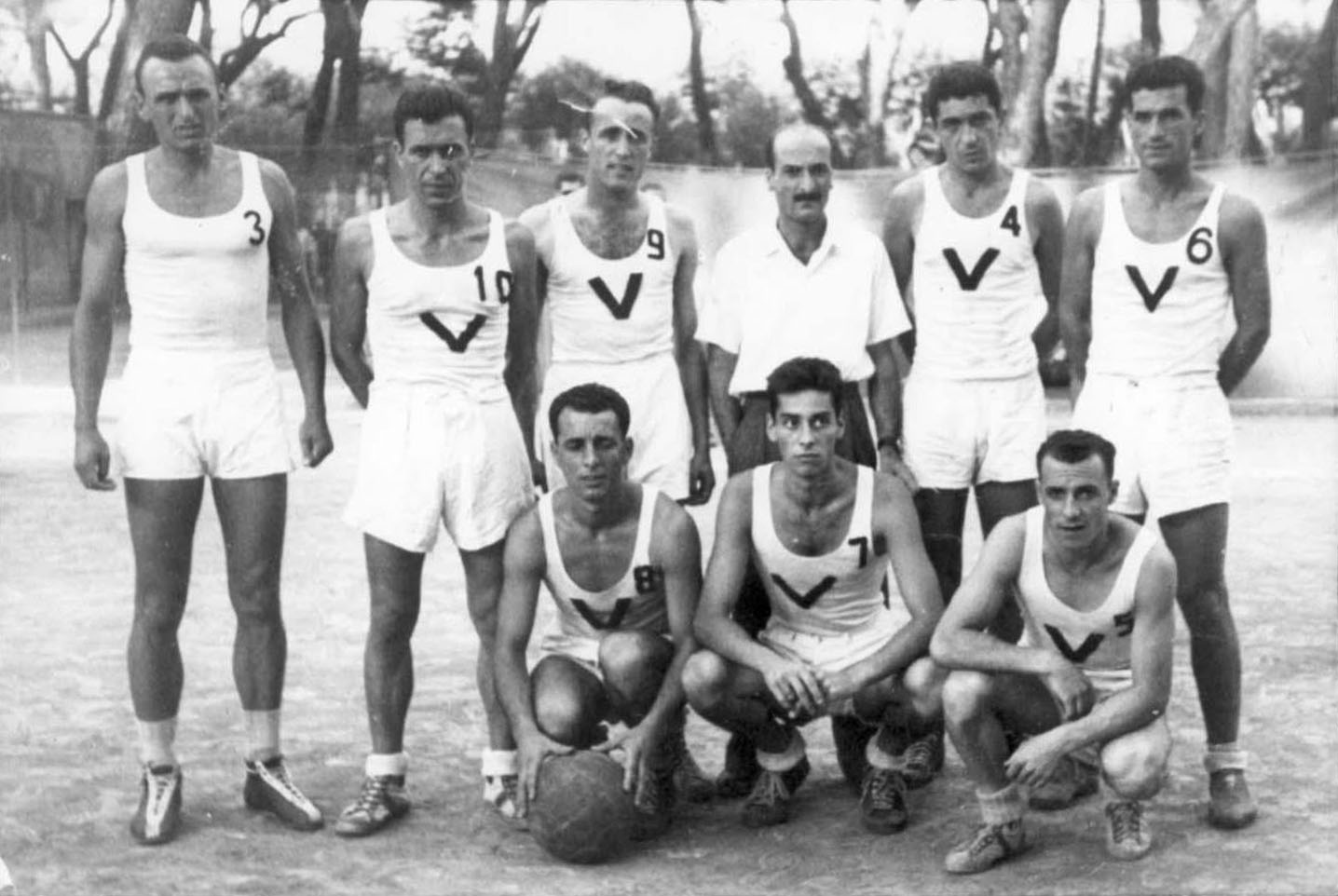
- Bersani (standing, second from right) in Virtus Bologna Italian champion 1945-1946.

Personal information
- Nationality: Italian
- Born: 2 January 1919; Bologna, Italy
- Died: 19 December 1965 (aged 46); Bologna, Italy

Sport
- Sport: Basketball

Gianfranco Bersani (2 January 1919 – 19 December 1965) was an Italian basketball player. He competed in the men's tournament at the 1948 Summer Olympics.
