= Dino Zucchi =

Italian basketball player (1927–2011)

Personal information
- Nationality: Italian
- Born: 5 December 1927 Bastiglia, Italy
- Died: 11 October 2011 (aged 83) Bologna

Sport
- Sport: Basketball

Dino Zucchi (5 December 1927 – 11 October 2011) was an Italian basketball player. He competed in the men's tournament at the 1952 Summer Olympics.
