= Ambrogio Bessi =

Italian basketball player (1915–1997)

Personal information
- Born: 1 July 1915 Trieste, Italy
- Died: 12 August 1997 (aged 82)

Ambrogio Bessi (1 July 1915 – 12 August 1997) was an Italian basketball player. He competed in the 1936 Summer Olympics.
