= Gianfranco Sardagna =

Italian basketball player

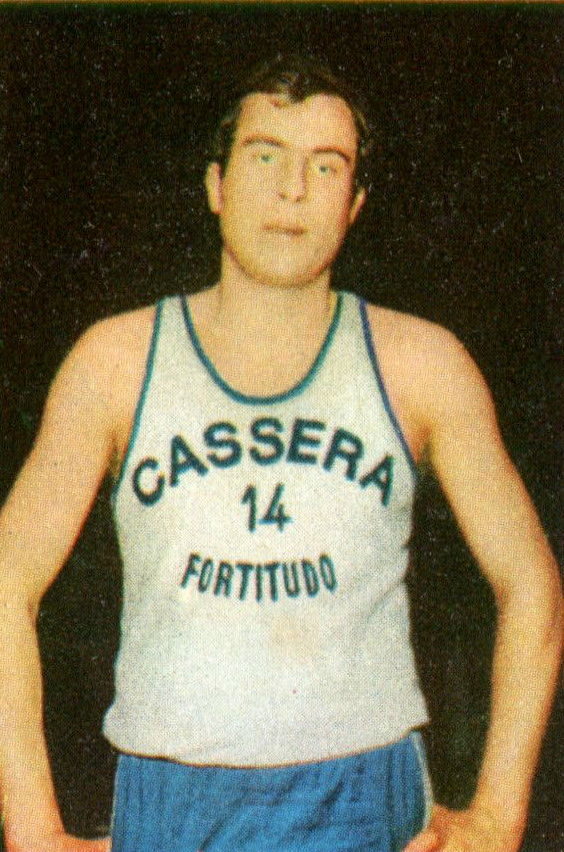

Personal information
- Born: 28 May 1935 Gorizia, Italy
- Listed height: 1.90 m (6 ft 3 in)
- Listed weight: 80 kg (176 lb)

Career information
- Playing career: 1955–1964
- Position: Small forward
- Number: 7, 14

Career history
- 1955-1956: Reyer Venezia
- 1957-1959: Olimpia Milano
- 1959-1961: Virtus Bologna
- 1961-1964: Olimpia Milano

Career highlights
- 4× Italian League champion (1958, 1959, 1962, 1963)

Gianfranco Sardagna (born 28 May 1935) is a retired Italian basketball player. He was part of Italian teams that finished fourth and fifth at the 1960 and 1964 Summer Olympics, respectively.

== Club career ==
Sardagna began his career in 1955 with Reyer Venezia. Two years later, he moved to Olimpia Milano. While playing in Milan, Sardagna enjoyed success, winning 4 Italian League titles. From 1959 to 1961, he played for Virtus Bologna team.

In 1958, the Italian international made his debut in the EuroLeague and in total, he played 5 seasons in this competition. In two of those seasons, Sardagna finished the season in the Top 20 in scoring.
