= Guido Carlo Gatti =

Italian basketball player (1938–2024)

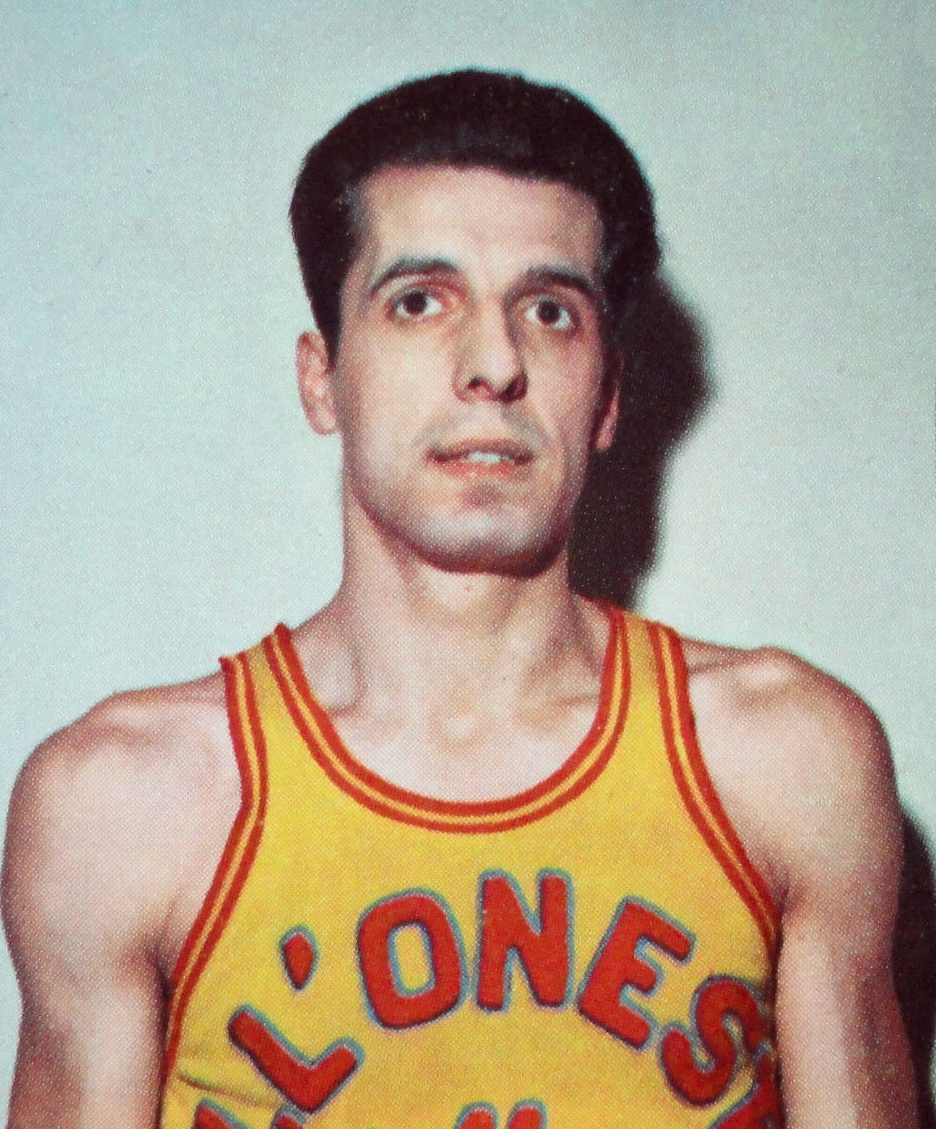
- Gatti in 1968

Personal information
- Born: 29 April 1938 Gubbio, Italy
- Died: 3 September 2024 (aged 86)
- Height: 1.92 m (6 ft 4 in)
- Weight: 85 kg (187 lb)

Sport
- Sport: Basketball

Guido Carlo Gatti (29 April 1938 – 3 September 2024) was an Italian basketball player. He was part of Italian teams that won a gold medal at the 1963 Mediterranean Games and finished eighth at the 1968 Summer Olympics.

== Biography ==
Guido Carlo Gatti was born in Gubbio to Vittorio Gatti, a businessman and descendant of an Umbrian noble, and an unknown mother. He attended classical lyceum and subsequently dedicated himself to his career in sports, namely basketball. After his sports career, he managed the clothing company founded by his father, which dealt with current well-known brands such as Armani, Versace, and Moschino. The company later failed due to the cost of labour being considered too high by the fashion giants. Carlo found his family moved to various parts of central-northern Italy at this time, such as Pesaro and Varese. Around the mid-nineties, he opened the La Casolare farmhouse in the middle of the Tuscan countryside together with his wife, Giovanna Bulgheroni, cousin of the entrepreneur Toto Bulgheroni. Today, the farmhouse has been sold, and the family lives in the province of Varese.

With the Italian national basketball team he played in the 1963 FIBA World Championship, EuroBasket 1965 and at the 1968 Summer Olympics.

Gatti had two children, Emanuela and Alessandro Gatti, the latter a businessman. Gatti died on 3 September 2024, at the age of 86.
