= Carlo Caglieris =

Italian basketball player (born 1951)

Personal information
- Born: 2 July 1951 (age 75) Brescia, Italy
- Listed height: 5 ft 9.5 in (1.77 m)
- Listed weight: 176 lb (80 kg)
- Position: Point guard

Career history
- 1968–1971: Libertas Biella
- 1971–1974: Libertas Asti
- 1974–1975: Fortitudo Bologna
- 1975–1981: Virtus Bologna
- 1981–1985: Auxilium Torino
- 1985–1986: Treviso
- 1986–1988: Basket Asti

Career highlights
- 3× Italian League champion (1976, 1979, 1980)
Medals
Representing Italy
EuroBasket
Gold medal – first place	1983 France
European U-18 Championship
Bronze medal – third place	1970 Greece	Team

Carlo Caglieris (born 2 July 1951) is an Italian former basketball player. He competed in the men's tournament at the 1984 Summer Olympics. Caglieris is widely regarded as one of the greatest Italian point guards of his generation, having won three national championships with Virtus Bologna.
