= Gianluigi Jessi =

Italian basketball player (1945–2026)

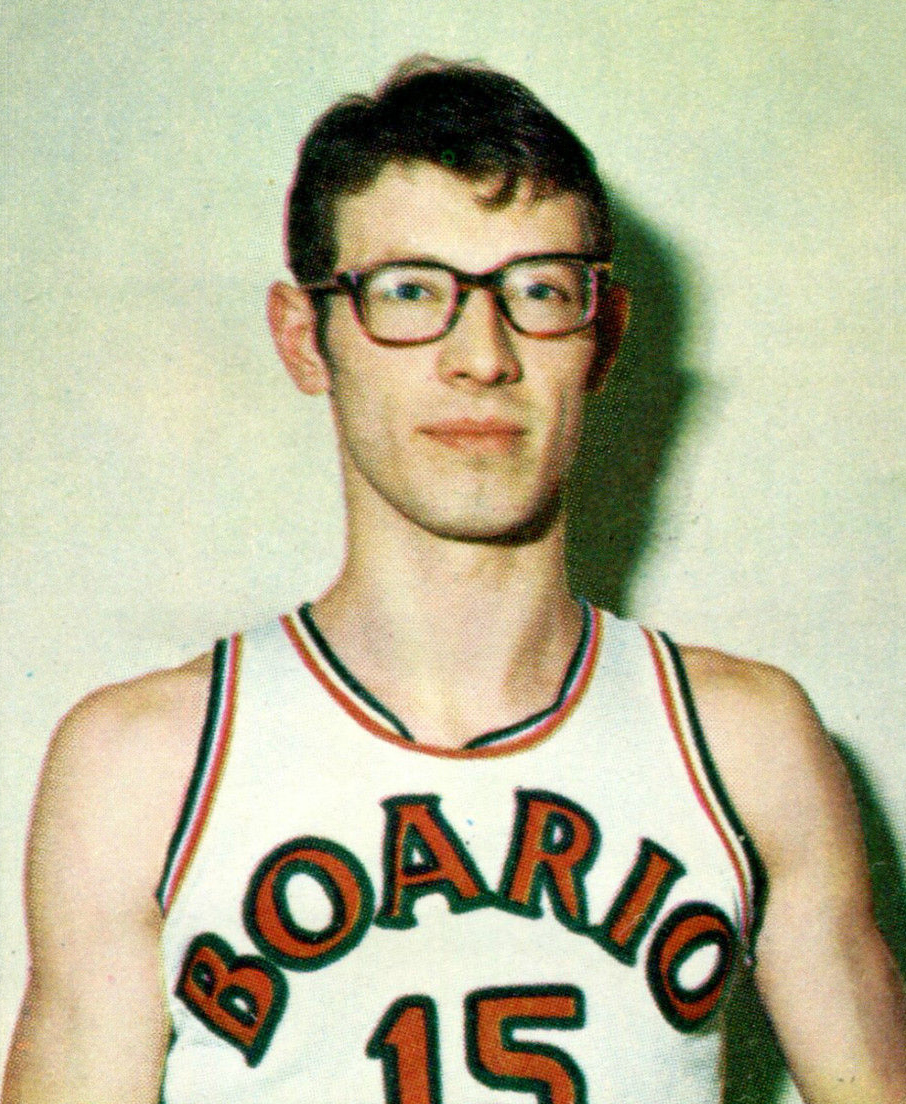
- Jessi in 1968 or earlier

Personal information
- Born: 7 July 1945 Padua, Italy
- Died: 24 February 2026 (aged 80) Padua
- Height: 1.85 m (6 ft 1 in)
- Weight: 78 kg (172 lb)

Sport
- Sport: Basketball

Gianluigi Jessi (7 July 1945 – 24 February 2026) was an Italian basketball player. He was part of the Italian team that finished eighth at the 1968 Summer Olympics. Jessi died on 24 February 2026, at the age of 80.
