= Achille Canna =

Italian basketball player (born 1932)

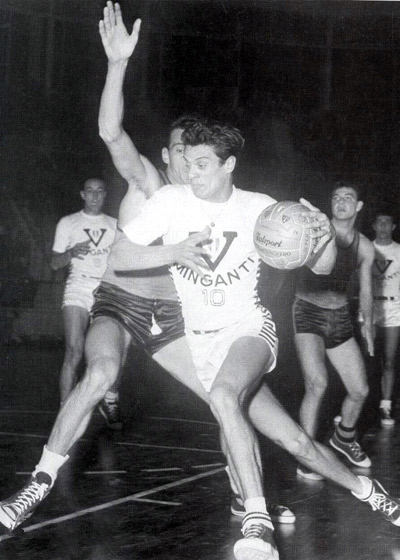

Personal information
- Born: 24 July 1932 (age 94) Gradisca d'Isonzo, Italy
- Listed height: 1.90 m (6 ft 3 in)
- Listed weight: 76 kg (168 lb)

Career history
- Virtus Bologna

Career highlights
- Italian Basketball Hall of Fame (2015)

Achille Canna (born 24 July 1932) is a retired Italian basketball player. He was part of the Italian team that finished 17th and fourth at the 1952 and 1960 Summer Olympics, respectively.
