= Valentino Pellarini =

Italian basketball player (1919–1992)

Personal information
- Nationality: Italian
- Born: 26 October 1919; Koper, Slovenia
- Died: 13 May 1992 (aged 72)

Sport
- Sport: Basketball

Valentino Pellarini (26 October 1919 – 13 May 1992) was an Italian basketball player. He competed in the men's tournament at the 1948 Summer Olympics.
