= Giorgio Bongiovanni =

Italian basketball player (born 1926)

Personal information
- Nationality: Italian
- Born: 4 March 1926 (age 99); Bologna, Italy

Sport
- Sport: Basketball

Giorgio Bongiovanni (born 4 March 1926) is an Italian former basketball player. He competed in the men's tournament at the 1952 Summer Olympics.
