= Vittorio Ferracini =

Italian basketball player (born 1951)

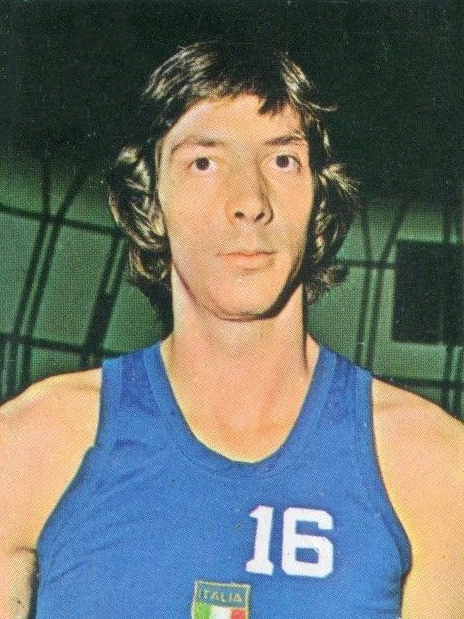

Personal information
- Born: 8 November 1951 (age 74) Milan, Italy
- Height: 2.04 m (6 ft 8 in)

Sport
- Sport: Basketball
- Club: Olimpia Milano; Pallacanestro Treviso; Fortitudo Pallacanestro Bologna
Medal record
Representing Italy
European Championships
Bronze medal – third place	1975 Yugoslavia	Team

Vittorio Ferracini (born 8 November 1951) is a retired Italian basketball player. He was part of Italian teams that won bronze medals at the 1975 European championships and finished fourth in 1977.
