= Sergio Ferriani =

Italian basketball player (1925–2001)

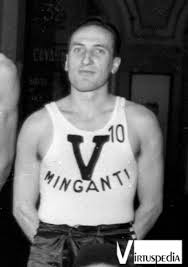

Personal information
- Nationality: Italian
- Born: 30 November 1925; Bologna, Italy
- Died: 30 November 2001 (aged 76)

Sport
- Sport: Basketball

Sergio Ferriani (30 November 1925 – 30 November 2001) was an Italian basketball player. He competed in the men's tournament at the 1948 Summer Olympics and the 1952 Summer Olympics.
