= Vittorio Tracuzzi =

Italian basketball player (1923–1986)

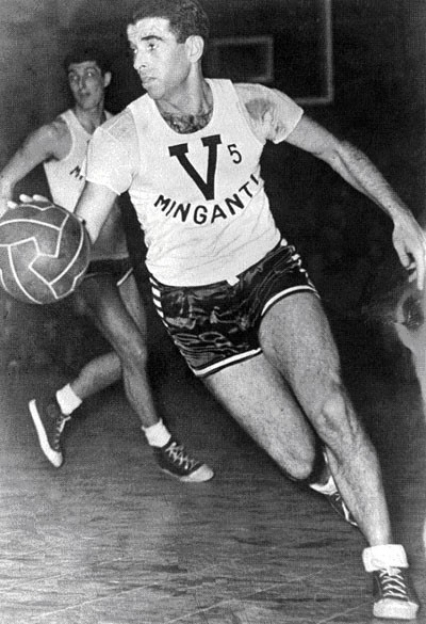
- Vittorio Tracuzzi playing for Virtus Bologna

Personal information
- Born: 2 January 1923 San Filippo del Mela, Italy
- Died: 21 October 1986 (aged 63) Bologna, Italy

Career history

Playing
- 1946–1948: Ginnastica Roma
- 1948–1954: Varese
- 1954–1956: Virtus Bologna

Coaching
- 1948–1954: Varese
- 1953–1954: Legnano
- 1954–1960: Virtus Bologna
- 1960–1962: Cantù
- 1962–1965: Varese
- 1965–1966: Olimpia Cagliari
- 1966–1968: Varese
- 1968–1970: Pallacanestro Milano
- 1970–1972: Virtus Bologna
- 1972–1976: Junior Casale
- 1976–1977: Cestistica Messina
- 1977–1978: Viola Reggio Calabria
- 1978–1979: Virtus Ragusa

Career highlights
- Cup Winners' Cup winner (1967); 3× Italian League champion (1955, 1956, 1964)

Vittorio Tracuzzi (2 January 1923 – 21 October 1986) was an Italian basketball player. He competed in the men's tournament at the 1948 Summer Olympics.
