= Giusto Pellanera =

Italian basketball player (1938–2024)

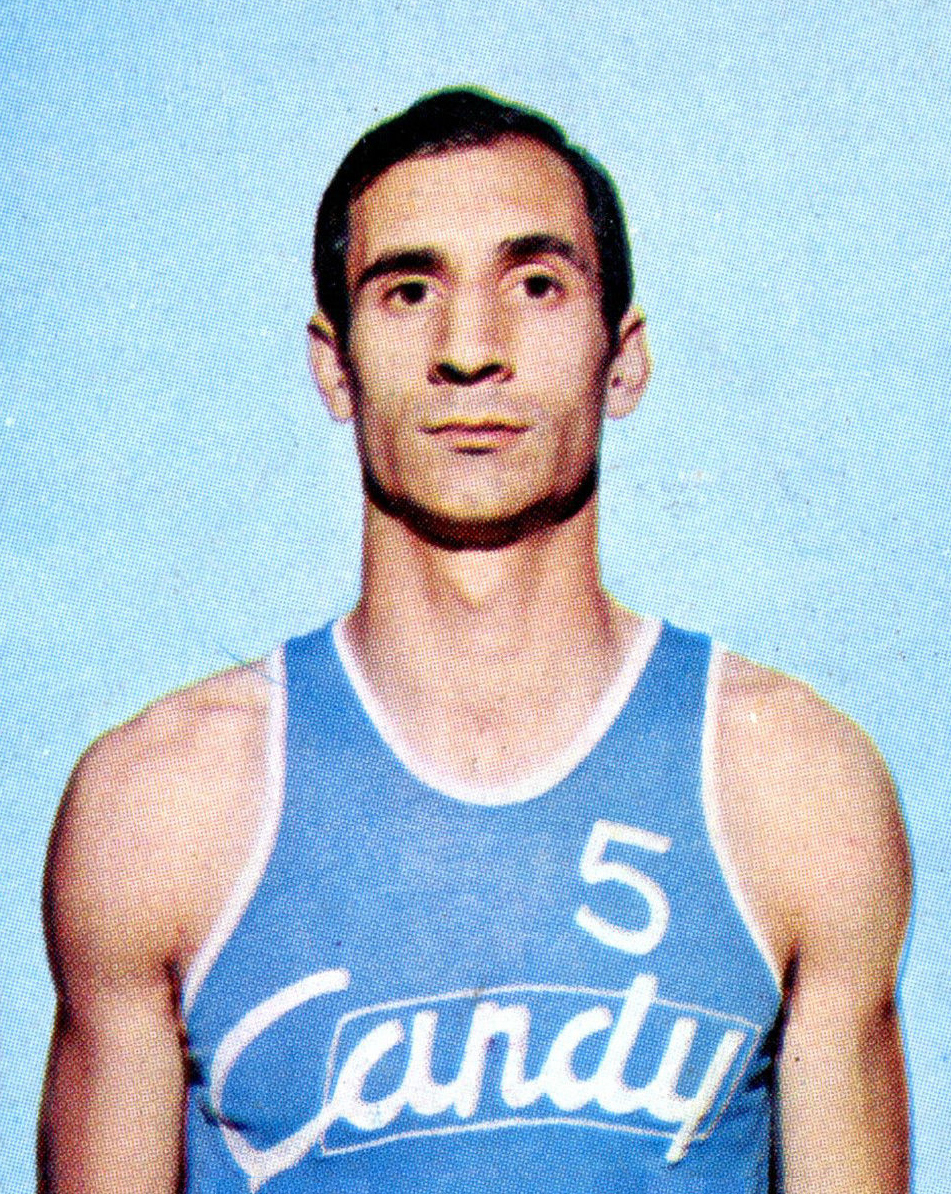

Personal information
- Born: 12 March 1938 Teramo, Italy
- Died: 4 May 2024 (aged 86) Bologna, Italy
- Height: 1.86 m (6 ft 1 in)
- Weight: 80 kg (180 lb)

Sport
- Sport: Basketball
- Club: Virtus Bologna
Medal record
Representing Italy
Mediterranean Games
Gold medal – first place	1963 Naples	Team

Giusto Corrado Pellanera (12 March 1938 – 4 May 2024) was an Italian basketball player. He won a gold medal at the 1963 Mediterranean Games and finished fifth and eighth at the 1964 and 1968 Olympics, respectively. His team placed fourth at EuroBasket 1965. He played 107 matches with the Italian national team, making 582 points. After his retirement in 1973, he served as a coach for the Serie A2 team Pordenone, and as a president for Teramo Basket. Pellanera died in Bologna on 4 May 2024, at the age of 86.
