= Antonio Calebotta =

Dalmatian Italian basketball player (1930–2002)

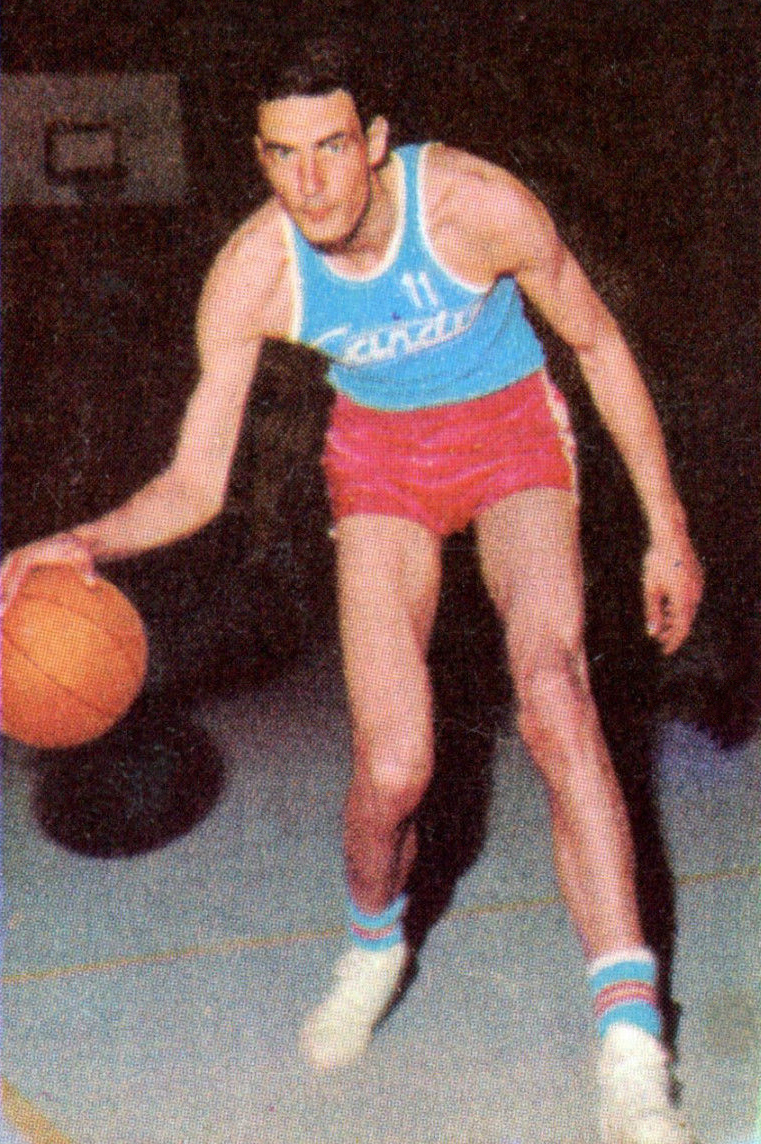

Personal information
- Born: 30 June 1930 Split, Croatia
- Died: 23 February 2002 (aged 71) Bentivoglio, Italy
- Height: 2.04 m (6 ft 8 in)
- Weight: 88 kg (194 lb)

Sport
- Sport: Basketball

Antonio Calebotta (30 June 1930 – 23 March 2002) was a Dalmatian Italian basketball player. He was part of the Italian team that finished fourth at the 1960 Summer Olympics.
