= Enrico Pagani =

Italian basketball player (1929–1998)

Personal information
- Nationality: Italian
- Born: 7 September 1929; Shanghai, China
- Died: 2 October 1998 (aged 69); Milan, Italy

Sport
- Sport: Basketball

Enrico Pagani (7 September 1929 – 2 October 1998) was an Italian basketball player. He competed in the men's tournament at the 1952 Summer Olympics.
