= Carlo Cerioni =

Italian basketball player (1925–2009)

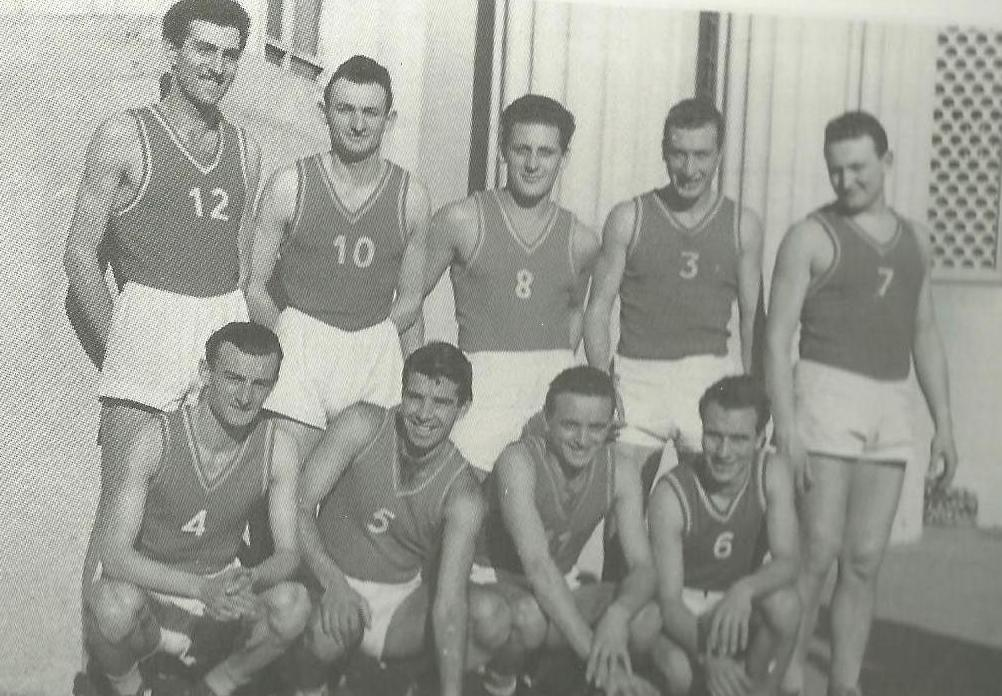
- Varese Basketball team in the first single-group Serie A championship, 1948-49. From the left, Fagarazzi, A. Giobbi, Marelli, Cerioni, Checchi, crouching V. Giobbi, Tracuzzi, Clerici and Pegurri.

Personal information
- Nationality: Italian
- Born: 11 November 1925; Rome, Italy
- Died: 29 December 2009 (aged 84); Rome, Italy

Sport
- Sport: Basketball

Carlo Cerioni (11 November 1925 – 29 December 2009) was an Italian basketball player. He competed in the men's tournament at the 1948 Summer Olympics and the 1952 Summer Olympics.
