= Massimo Cosmelli =

Italian basketball player (born 1943)

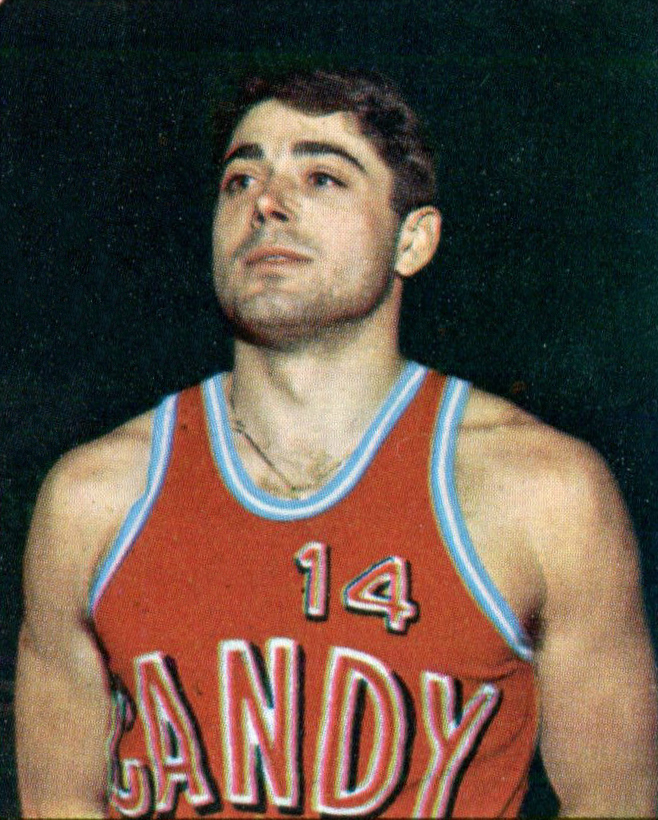

Virtus Bologna

Personal information
- Born: 6 August 1943 (age 83) Livorno, Italy
- Listed height: 1.80 m (5 ft 11 in)
- Listed weight: 76 kg (168 lb)

Career highlights
- Italian Basketball Hall of Fame (2016)
Medals
Representing Italy
EuroBasket
Bronze medal – third place	1971 Germany	Team

Massimo Cosmelli (born 6 August 1943) is a retired Italian basketball player. He won a bronze medal at the 1971 European Championships and finished fourth at the 1965 European Championships and eighth at the 1968 Summer Olympics.
