= Luigi Serafini (basketball) =

Italian basketball player (1951–2020)

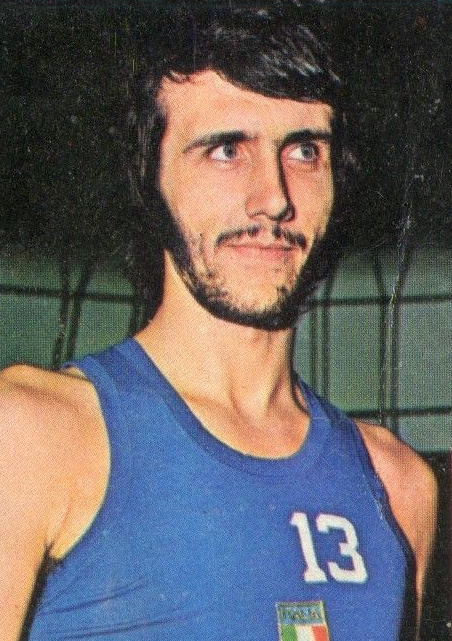

Personal information
- Born: 17 June 1951 Formigine, Italy
- Died: 23 August 2020 (aged 69) Bologna, Italy
- Height: 2.10 m (6 ft 11 in)
- Weight: 105 kg (231 lb)

Sport
- Sport: Basketball
- Club: Virtus Bologna
Medal record
Representing Italy
European Championships
Bronze medal – third place	1971 Germany	Team
European U-18 Championship
Bronze medal – third place	1970 Greece	Team

Luigi Serafini (17 June 1951 – 23 August 2020) was an Italian basketball player. He was part of the Italian teams that won a bronze medal at the 1971 European championships and finished fourth in 1977. He competed at the 1972 and 1976 Olympics and finished in fourth and fifth place, respectively.
