= Luigi Rapini =

Italian basketball player (1924–2013)

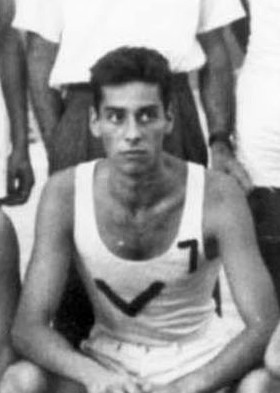

Personal information
- Nationality: Italian
- Born: 21 July 1924; Bologna, Italy
- Died: 18 September 2013 (aged 89); Bologna, Italy

Sport
- Sport: Basketball

Luigi Rapini (21 July 1924 – 18 September 2013) was an Italian basketball player. He competed in the men's tournament at the 1948 Summer Olympics and the 1952 Summer Olympics.
