= Enrico Bovone =

Italian basketball player (1946–2001)

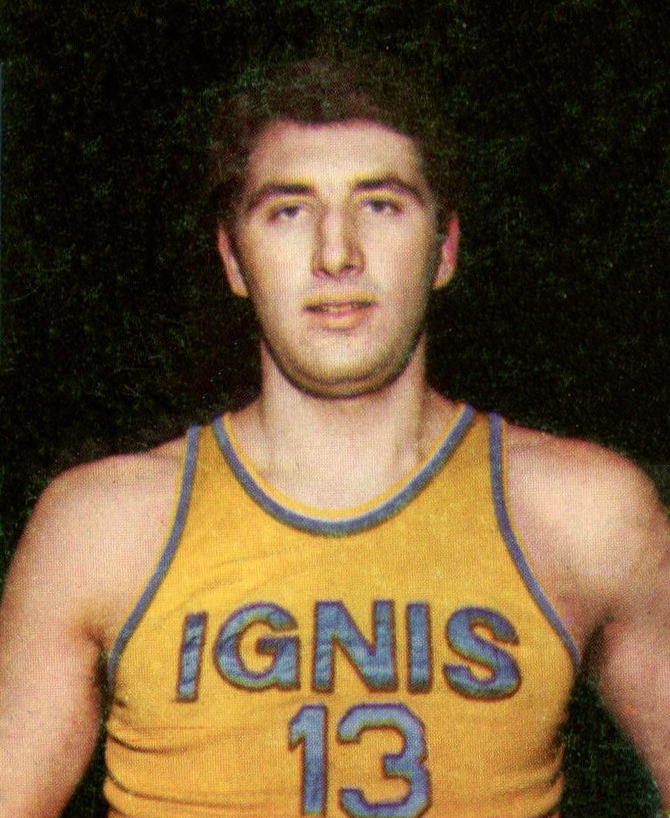
- Lombardi c. 1965-66

Personal information
- Born: 30 March 1946 Novi Ligure, Italy
- Died: 2 May 2001 (aged 55) Sovicille, Italy
- Height: 2.10 m (6 ft 11 in)
- Weight: 105 kg (231 lb)

Sport
- Sport: Basketball
- Club: Virtus Bologna; Fortitudo Bologna

Enrico Bovone (30 March 1946 – 2 May 2001) was an Italian basketball player. He was part of the Italian team that finished eighth at 1968 Summer Olympics. Bovone was married twice and both time divorced; he had five children from one of those marriages. He committed suicide on 2 May 2001, aged 55.
