= Augusto Giomo =

Italian basketball player (1940–2016)

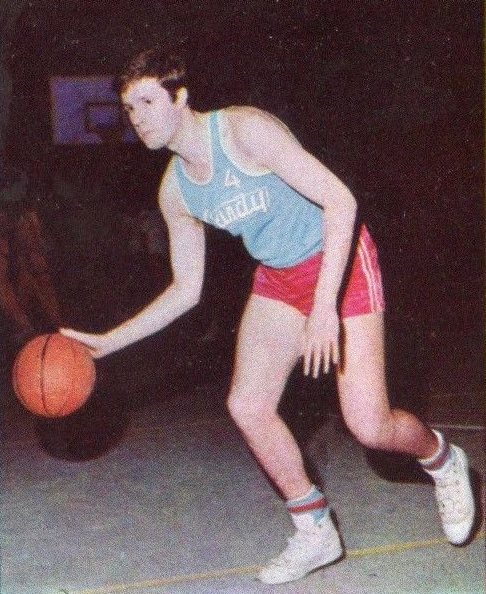

Personal information
- Born: 3 February 1940 Treviso, Italy
- Died: 27 January 2016 (aged 75) Treviso, Italy
- Height: 1.87 m (6 ft 2 in)
- Weight: 74 kg (163 lb)

Sport
- Sport: Basketball
- Club: Virtus Bologna

Augusto Giomo (3 February 1940 – 27 January 2016) was an Italian basketball player. He competed at the 1960 and 1964 Olympics and finished in fourth and fifth place, respectively. His younger brother Giorgio played for Italy at the 1972 Games.
