= Petar Skansi =

Croatian basketball player and coach (1943–2022)

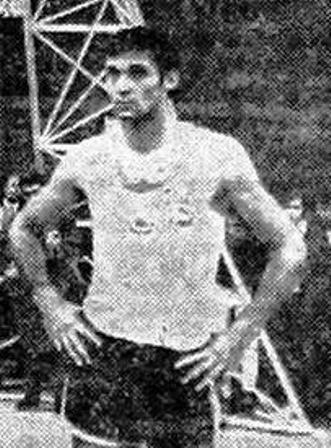
- Skansi with Yugoslavia at the 1968 Olympics

Personal information
- Born: 23 November 1943 Sumartin, Independent State of Croatia
- Died: 4 April 2022 (aged 78) Ljubljana, Slovenia
- Listed height: 2.06 m (6 ft 9 in)
- Listed weight: 104 kg (229 lb)

Career information
- Playing career: 1964–1976
- Position: Center
- Coaching career: 1973–2004

Career history

Playing
- 1964–1972: Jugoplastika
- 1972–1973: Maxmobili Pesaro
- 1973–1976: Jugoplastika

Coaching
- 1973–1978: Jugoplastika
- 1981–1983: Scavolini Pesaro
- 1984–1985: Honky Fabriano
- 1987–1988: Hitachi Venezia
- 1988–1989: Phonola Roma
- 1990–1993: Benetton Treviso
- 1997–1999: Teamsystem Bologna
- 1999–2000: PAOK
- 2003: Split CO
- 2003–2004: Krka

Career highlights
- As player: FIBA European Selection (1971); Yugoslav League champion (1971); 2× Yugoslav Cup winner (1972, 1974); Croatian Athlete of the Year (1970); FIBA's 50 Greatest Players (1991); As head coach: FIBA Saporta Cup champion (1983); 2× FIBA Korać Cup champion (1976, 1977); Yugoslav League champion (1977); Yugoslav Cup winner (1977); Italian League champion (1992); Italian Cup winner (1993); Italian Super Cup winner (1998); 2× Franjo Bučar State Award for Sport (1992, 2003)
Medals
Men's basketball
Representing Yugoslavia
Olympic Games
Silver medal – second place	1968 Mexico City
FIBA World Cup
Silver medal – second place	1967 Uruguay
Gold medal – first place	1970 Yugoslavia
EuroBasket
Silver medal – second place	1965 Soviet Union
Mediterranean Games
Gold medal – first place	1967 Tunis
Head coach for Yugoslavia
EuroBasket
Bronze medal – third place	1979 Italy
Head coach for Croatia
Olympic Games
Silver medal – second place	1992 Barcelona

Petar Skansi (pronounced [pětar skǎːnsi]; 23 November 1943 – 4 April 2022) was a Croatian professional basketball player and coach. During his playing career, he played for Jugoplastika and Maxmobili Pesaro. He was named one of FIBA's 50 Greatest Players in 1991. He was a member of the Yugoslavia national team that won the silver medal at the 1968 Summer Olympics.

For his basketball achievements, he was awarded the Franjo Bučar State Award for Sport twice, in 1992 and 2003. He also served as an assistant to Minister of Science, Education and Sports Željko Jovanović in Zoran Milanović's government from 2012 to 2014, with responsibility for the sports portfolio.

== Early life ==
Born in the Sumartin village on the island of Brač, to father Petar, who was navy captain, and mother, Marija, who was a teacher, Skansi graduated from the streamlined maritime high school in Split, in 1961. Simultaneously, he took up water polo, playing it in the Jadran Split youth system.

== Playing career ==
=== Club playing career ===
Skansi first played club basketball with the Yugoslav League club Jugoplastika, where he played from 1964 to 1972. He then played with the Italian league club Maxmobili Pesaro, from 1972 to 1973. After that, he returned to Jugoplastika, where he remained until he retired from playing basketball, in 1976.

He was a member of the FIBA European Selection in 1971, and he was the EuroLeague Finals Top Scorer in 1972.

=== National team playing career ===
Skansi was also a member of the Yugoslav national team. With Yugoslavia, he won numerous medals at the major FIBA tournaments, including the silver medal at the 1965 EuroBasket, the silver medal at the 1967 World Championship, the silver medal at the 1968 Mexico City Summer Olympics, and the gold medal at the 1970 World Championship. He also won the gold medal at the 1967 Mediterranean Games.

After Yugoslavia won the gold medal at the 1970 World Championship, Skansi was named the Croatian Athlete of the Year. After his retirement from playing basketball, in recognition of his playing career, he was named to the FIBA's 50 Greatest Players list, in 1991.

== Club coaching career ==
=== Jugoplastika ===
Skansi became coach-player at Jugoplastika in the season 1973–74 and he remained in that status until his retirement from playing basketball in 1976. Then he continued his career in basketball only as head coach. In his first season as coach-player, Skansi led Jugoplastika in the semifinals of 1973–74 FIBA Korać Cup where his team was eliminated hardly by Partizan (97–108 loss in Belgrade and 85–75 win in Split). Also in the same season they won the Yugoslav Basketball Cup (92–85 against Crvena zvezda) and Jugoplastika ranked second in the First Federal Basketball League.

In 1974–75 season, still as coach-player of Jugoplastika, he led his team in the semifinals of 1974–75 FIBA European Cup Winners' Cup where his team was eliminated by the defending champions Crvena zvezda (88–76 win in Split and 63–81 loss in Belgrade). In the domestic competitions Jugoplastika reached the final of Yugoslav Basketball Cup but lost to Crvena zvezda and in the First Federal Basketball League once again ranked second behind the champion Zadar.

In 1975–76 season his last as player alongside coach, Skansi won his first European trophy the FIBA Korać Cup in a double final against the Italian club Chinamartini Torino. In the domestic league he led Jugoplastika in the second place.

The next year (1976–77) Skansi retired as player and continued his career in the city of Split as head coach of the Dalmatian club. This season was maybe his best over all his coaching career because he led his team in the success of the small Triple Crown after the winning of the FIBA Korać Cup (against Alco Bologna), the Yugoslav Cup (against Kvarner) and the First Federal Basketball League.

In 1977–78 season Petar Skansi led Jugoplastika as Yugoslav champion in the Semifinals group stage of FIBA European Champions Cup where they ranked 5th with a 5 wins–5 losses record. In the end of the season he left the club.

=== Scavolini ===
In summer 1981, having spent the previous four years coaching in various capacities within the Yugoslav national team system, Skansi returned to club coaching by accepting the offer from Victoria Libertas (Scavolini), an ambitious and financially stable club from Pesaro backed by entrepreneur Valter Scavolini who also performed the club president role. Having taken over in 1975 and invested heavily since, the club's financial backer who made his wealth manufacturing and selling kitchen appliances was looking for elusive domestic league success. Giving further indication of Scavolini's ambitions in summer 1981 was the simultaneous acquisition of 28-year-old European superstar Dragan Kićanović from Partizan whom Skansi knew well from coaching him in the Yugoslav national team. Players Skansi inherited included talented young power forward Walter Magnifico, shooting guard / small forward Mike Sylvester, and mainstay forward Giuseppe Ponzoni.

Skansi's 1981 head coaching appointment at Scavolini, by his own admission, owed a lot to fellow Yugoslav Aleksandar Nikolić's coaching success in Italy throughout the 1970s that opened doors in Italian league to other Yugoslav coaches such as Skansi and Bogdan Tanjević.

==== 1981–82: runners-up in Italy ====
Playing in a fourteen-club Italian league, Skansi's Scavolini Pesaro finished the regular season top of the table with a 25–7 record thus getting the home court advantage throughout the playoffs. It also ensured a bye in the initial round-of-sixteen playoff stage, which meant starting from the quarter-final stage where they swept Fabriano 2–0 in a best-of-three series. The following round, the semifinals, brought Sinudyne Bologna, a much tougher test, and the series went to the deciding game three where Scavolini eked out a hard-fought 88–87 win on their home court in Pesaro. In the final, they faced Dan Peterson's Billy Milano, losing the home court advantage right away by dropping the opening game 86–89 on their home court; Olimpia won game two in Milan, 73–72, to take the title.

==== 1982–83: winning Saporta Cup, falling short in Italian League again ====
Ahead of the 1982–83 season, on Skansi's insistence, Scavolini Pesaro management signed 28-year-old center Željko Jerkov, another compatriot Skansi knew well from the Yugoslav national team as well as from Jugoplastika. With a starting five of Kićanović, Sylvester, Ponzoni, Magnifico, and Jerkov, as well as the previous season's experience, the goal was winning the league.

The Italian league expanded to 16 teams and Scavolini finished the regular season with a 21–9 record, placing third on the table.

They simultaneously competed in the 1982–83 FIBA European Cup Winners' Cup, winning it in March 1983 in Palma de Mallorca versus ASVEL.

The league playoffs began versus the sixth seed Auxilium Torino at the quarterfinal stage with Scavolini progressing fairly comfortably 2–1, winning both home games dominantly. The semifinals brought their nemesis Billy Milano, which had the home court advantage this time due to placing higher in the regular season than Scavolini. Billy won its opening home game by a big margin, before Scavolini responded with a large win of their own in Pesaro. The deciding game in Milan was never in doubt, as Olimpia routed Scavolini by a 14-point margin – a major disappointment for the Pesaro team.

As a direct consequence of falling to win the Italian league, both big name foreign signings, Kićanović and Jerkov, were not retained, while head coach Skansi initially survived, but he then got fired only one game into the 1983–84 league season.

=== Benetton ===
Skansi's best achievement in his Italian era was the winning of 1991–92 Italian League championship with Benetton Treviso. The next season Benetton under his coaching, reached the 1993 FIBA European League Final Four that took place in Peace and Friendship Stadium, Athens and unexpectedly lost to Limoges by 55–59 score.

== National team coaching ==
=== Assistant at Yugoslavia national team ===
In 1977, after coaching Jugoplastika for a season-and-a-half, thirty-three-year-old Skansi got picked by Aleksandar Nikolić to be the coach's assistant for EuroBasket 1977. With its famous five of Slavnić, Kićanović, Delibašić, Dalipagić, and Ćosić, Yugoslavia won gold in dominant fashion.

Next summer, Skansi continued in his assistant coach role under Nikolić for the 1978 FIBA World Championship as Yugoslavia won gold again with the same team – its second world title in eight years.

=== Yugoslavia head coach ===
Right after winning the 1978 world title, Nikolić stepped down and his assistant Skansi got the head coaching job ahead of the EuroBasket in Italy. Losing their last round-robin group game 77-76 versus Miki Berkovich-led Israel meant Yugoslavia failed to progress to the tournament's final game. However, the team recovered to win its third-place game versus Czechoslovakia, which provided a bit of a reprieve though the tournament overall was still seen as a disappointment after years of winning, including three consecutive EuroBasket titles.

=== Croatia ===
After Croatia's independence in 1991, Skansi became the Croatian national basketball team head coach, and with them he won the silver medal at the 1992 Summer Olympic Games.

== Political career ==
From January 2012 until June 2014, Skansi served as deputy minister of science, education and sports to Željko Jovanović, in the centre-left government of Zoran Milanović.

== Personal life ==
Skansi was married to Damira, with whom he had a daughter, Jana and a son, Luka. From 1984, Skansi's primary residence was in Slovenia, where he started a real estate maintenance business.

== Honours as player ==
=== National ===
KK Split

- EuroLeague runner-up: 1971–72
- FIBA Korać Cup winner: 1975–76
- Yugoslav Basketball League winner: 1970–71; runner-up: 1971–72, 1973–74, 1974–75, 1975–76; third place: 1968–69, 1969–70
- Yugoslav Basketball Cup winner: 1971–72, 1973–74

=== International ===
Yugoslavia

- Summer Olympics runner-up: 1968
- FIBA Basketball World Cup winner: 1970; runner-up: 1967
- EuroBasket runner-up: 1965
- Mediterranean Games winner: 1967
