= FIBA Europe All-Star Game =

Basketball exhibition game

- Frequency: Annual
- Years active: 1964–1998
- Participants: FIBA European Selection Teams and various other FIBA Europe All-Star Teams
- Organizer: FIBA Europe

The FIBA Europe All-Star Game was an all-star basketball game, that was also known as the "FIBA Europe Festival". The "FIBA Europe All-Star Game Festival" was held from 1964 to 1998, from the 1963–64 to 1997–98 European basketball seasons. It was organized by FIBA Europe, the European division of FIBA. The FIBA Europe Selection Team, or the FIBA European Selection Team, won most of the FIBA Europe All-Star Game Festivals, with an overall record of 24–5.

The FIBA Europe All-Star Game Festival event was eventually replaced by the FIBA EuroStars All-Star Game event. Initially, both of the FIBA Europe all-star games existed together, starting in 1996, when the FIBA EuroStars debuted, during the 1996–97 season. However, the FIBA Europe All-Star Game was eventually permanently replaced by the FIBA EuroStars in 1998, during the 1998–99 season. The FIBA EuroStars All-Star Game was itself eventually discontinued by FIBA Europe. It was last held in 2007.

== Awards and selection criteria ==
The FIBA Europe All-Star Game Festival featured the "FIBA European Selection Team". Being chosen for the FIBA European Selection Team was one of the highest individual honors for a European club player at the time. The all-star games pitted the players of the FIBA European Selection Teams, against various club teams, national teams, and non-European-wide all-star team selections. Only the players that were chosen to the FIBA European Selection Teams were credited with having All-European Club Team honors. While all of the players that participated in each of the all-star games, from both teams, were credited as having all-star game appearances.

Originally, the first five FIBA European Selection Teams (1964, 1965, 1966, 1967, and 1968), were selected from among the players of the European-wide top-tier level FIBA European Champions Cup (FIBA EuroLeague). However, starting with the 1969 All-Star Game event, the FIBA European Selection team players were chosen from among the players from all of the club leagues in Europe. Over the years, most of the all-star game's FIBA European Selection Team players, came from what were the three major European-wide professional club basketball leagues at the time, the aforementioned top-tier level FIBA EuroLeague, the second-tier level FIBA European Cup (later known as the FIBA Saporta Cup), and the third-tier level FIBA Korać Cup. In addition to talent, skills, and performance, diversity was also paramount in choosing the players of the FIBA European Selection teams, which aimed at allowing for several different European national basketball schools to be represented at the all-star games.

After the FIBA Europe All-Star Game Festival was last held in 1998, it was replaced by the FIBA EuroStars event. The FIBA EuroStars was a normal all-star game selection award for the players that competed in it. Being chosen to one of the FIBA EuroStars game's teams did not give a player a separate individual All-European Club Team award, like being named a member of the FIBA European Selection Team did with the FIBA Europe All-Star Game Festivals.

In 2001, what was the equivalent of a FIBA European Selection Team award was introduced with the EuroLeague's All-EuroLeague Team award. As the All-EuroLeague Team also honors the top European selection of club team players into a list of ten players. However, unlike the FIBA Europe All-Star Game Festival's FIBA European Selection Team, the EuroLeague's All-EuroLeague Team selection does not include an all-star game event featuring the players.

== FIBA Europe All-Star Game score sheets 1964–1998 ==
=== FIBA Europe All-Star Exhibition Games I ===
(In honor of Real Madrid's first FIBA European Champions Cup (EuroLeague) title)

17 May 1964 (Palacio de Deportes, Madrid, Spain)

- FIBA European Selection Team - (Spain) Real Madrid: 91–87

Real Madrid roster: #4 Ignacio San Martín (Spain) 0 points, #5 José Ramón Durand (Spain) 8 points, #6 Julio Descartín (Spain) 21 points, #7 Lolo Sainz (Spain) 11 points, #9 Antonio Palmero (Spain) 0 points, #10 Emiliano Rodríguez (Spain) 2 points, #11 Carlos Sevilliano (Spain) 10 points, #12 Bill Hanson (USA) 10 points, #13 Cliff Luyk (USA/Spain) 12 points, #14 Bob Burgess (USA) 15 points, #15 Moncho Monsalve (Spain) 6 points. Head Coach: Joaquim Hernandez (Spain)

FIBA European Selection Team roster: Radivoj Korać (Yugoslavia) 37 points, Miodrag Nikolić (Yugoslavia) 2 points, Slobodan Gordić (Yugoslavia) 12 points, Sandro Riminucci (Italy) 2 points, Gabriele Vianello (Italy) 4 points, Paolo Vittori (Italy) 2 points, Gianfranco Pieri (Italy) 0 points, Andrzej Pstrokoński (Poland) 0 points, Janusz Wichowski (Poland) 6 points, Roger Antoine (France) 8 points, Tani Cohen-Mintz (Israel) 11 points, Jozef "Jef" Eygel (Belgium) 7 points. Head Coaches: Miloslav Kříž (Czechoslovakia) & Robert Busnel (France)

=== FIBA Europe All-Star Festival I ===
15 October 1965 (Kraków, Poland)

- FIBA European Selection Team vs. (Spain) Real Madrid: 101–83 (38–37)

FIBA European Selection Team roster: Radivoj Korać (Yugoslavia) 24 points, Trajko Rajković (Yugoslavia) 21 points, Sauro Bufalini (Italy) 3 points, Nino Cescutti (Italy) 7 points, Massimo Villetti (Italy) 6 points, František Konvička (Czechoslovakia) 16 points, Vladimír Pištělák (Czechoslovakia) 4 points, Jan Bobrovský (Czechoslovakia) 4 points, Henri Grange (France) 8 points, Georgios Trontzos 8 points, Martti Liimo (Finland). Head Coaches: Miloslav Kříž (Czechoslovakia), Nello Paratore (Italy)

Real Madrid roster: Lolo Sainz (Spain) 11 points, Emiliano Rodríguez (Spain) 14 points, Miguel “Che” González (Spain) 15 points, Cliff Luyk (USA/Spain) 15 points, Moncho Monsalve (Spain) 10 points, Carlos Sevillano (Spain) 12 points, Julio Descartín (Spain) 6 points, Toncho Nava (Spain) 0 points. Head Coach: Robert Busnel (France)

Fouled out: Cliff Luyk, Moncho Monsalve, Massimo Villetti

15 October 1965 (Kraków, Poland) (Spain) Real Madrid vs. Wisła Kraków: 70–85

Real Madrid roster: Lolo Sainz (Spain), Emiliano Rodríguez (Spain), Miguel “Che” González (Spain), Cliff Luyk (USA/Spain), Moncho Monsalve (Spain), Carlos Sevillano (Spain), Julio Descartín (Spain), Toncho Nava (Spain). Head Coach: Robert Busnel (France)

Wisła Kraków roster: Bohdan Likszo (Poland), Edward Grzywna (Poland), Krystian Czernichowski (Poland), Ryszard Niewodowski (Poland), Jacek Pietrzyk (Poland), Jan Piotrowski (Poland), Andrzej Baron (Poland), Andrzej Guzik (Poland), Stefan Wójcik (Poland), Czesław Malec (Poland), Tadeusz Michałowski (Poland), Wiesław Langiewicz (Poland). Coaches: Jerzy Bętkowski (Poland), Jan Mikułowski (Poland)

16 October 1965 (Kraków, Poland)

- FIBA European Selection Team vs. (Poland) Wisła Kraków: 70–78 (37–43)

FIBA European Selection Team roster: Tani Cohen-Mintz (Israel) 0 points, Radivoj Korać (Yugoslavia) 24 points, Trajko Rajković (Yugoslavia) 4 points, Sauro Bufalini (Italy) 5 points, Nino Cescutti (Italy) 0 points, Massimo Villetti (Italy) 6 points, František Konvička (Czechoslovakia) 18 points, Vladimír Pištělák (Czechoslovakia) 0 points, Jan Bobrovský (Czechoslovakia) 11 points, Henri Grange (France) 2 points, Georgios Trontzos (Greece) 0 points, Martti Liimo (Finland) 0 points. Head Coaches: Miloslav Kříž (Czechoslovakia), Nello Paratore (Italy)

Wisła Kraków roster: Bohdan Likszo (Poland) 21 points, Edward Grzywna (Poland) 7 points, Krystian Czernichowski (Poland) 12 points, Ryszard Niewodowski (Poland), Jacek Pietrzyk (Poland), Jan Piotrowski (Poland), Andrzej Baron (Poland), Andrzej Guzik (Poland), Stefan Wójcik (Poland) 5 points, Czesław Malec (Poland) 13 points, Tadeusz Michałowski (Poland), Wiesław Langiewicz (Poland) 20 points. Coaches: Jerzy Bętkowski (Poland), Jan Mikułowski (Poland)

=== FIBA Europe All-Star Exhibition Games II ===
13 October 1966 (Ljubljana, Yugoslavia)

- FIBA European Selection Team - (Italy) Simmenthal Milano: 89–91

15 October 1966 (Ljubljana, Yugoslavia)

- FIBA European Selection Team - (Socialist Federal Republic of Yugoslavia) AŠK Olimpija: 102–94

FIBA European Selection Team roster: Emiliano Rodríguez (Spain), Carlos Sevillano (Spain), Jiří Zídek Sr. (Czechoslovakia), Jiří Zedníček (Czechoslovakia), Jiri Ammer (Czechoslovakia), Jean Degros (France), Christos Zoupas (Greece), Willy Steveniers (Belgium), John Loridon (Belgium), Mihai Albu (Romania), Cvjatko Barchovski (Bulgaria), Bohdan Likszo (Poland). Head Coaches: Miloslav Kříž (Czechoslovakia) & Robert Busnel (France)

=== FIBA Europe All-Star Exhibition Games III ===
1 November 1967 (Antwerp, Belgium)

- FIBA European Selection Team - (Spain) Real Madrid: 124–97

3 November 1967 (Antwerp, Belgium)

- FIBA European Selection Team - (Belgium) Bell Mechelen: 112–101

FIBA European Selection Team roster: Ivo Daneu (Yugoslavia), Borut Bassin (Yugoslavia), Massimo Masini (Italy), Jiří Zídek Sr. (Czechoslovakia), Jiří Zedníček (Czechoslovakia), Bohumil Tomášek (Czechoslovakia), Jiří Růžička (Czechoslovakia), Georgios Trontzos (Greece), Jorma Pilkevaara (Finland), Alin Savu (Romania), Włodzimierz Trams (Poland). Head Coaches: Miloslav Kříž (Czechoslovakia) & Robert Busnel (France) & Witold Zagórski (Poland)

=== FIBA Europe All-Star Festival II ===
14 June 1968 (Belgrade, Yugoslavia)

- FIBA European Selection Team vs. (Spain) Real Madrid: 72–56

16 June 1968 (Belgrade, Yugoslavia)

- FIBA European Selection Team vs. (Socialist Federal Republic of Yugoslavia) Crvena Zvezda Beograd: 96–79

FIBA European Selection Team roster: Krešimir Ćosić (Yugoslavia), Josip Giuseppe "Pino" Djerdja (Yugoslavia), Francisco "Nino" Buscato (Spain), František Konvička (Czechoslovakia), Vladimír Pištělák (Czechoslovakia), Massimo Masini (Italy), Boleslaw Kwiatkowski (Poland), Veikko Vainio (Finland), Ivan Vodenicharski (Bulgaria), Lucien Michelet (Belgium). Head Coaches: Miloslav Kříž (Czechoslovakia) & Witold Zagórski (Poland)

=== FIBA Europe All-Star Festival III ===
20 November 1969 (Belgrade, Yugoslavia)

- FIBA European Selection Team vs. (Socialist Federal Republic of Yugoslavia) Yugoslavian National Team: 93–90

FIBA European Selection Team roster: Sergei Belov (USSR), Gennadi Volnov (USSR), Modestas Paulauskas (USSR), Emiliano Rodríguez (Spain), Clifford Luyk (Spain), Francisco "Nino" Buscato (Spain), Jiří Zedníček (Czechoslovakia), Robert Mifka (Czechoslovakia), Mieczysław Łopatka (Poland), Mincho Dimov (Bulgaria). Head Coach: Witold Zagórski (Poland)

=== FIBA Europe All-Star Festival IV ===
10 June 1970 (Athens, Greece)

- FIBA European Selection Team vs. (Italy) Ignis Varèse: 88–72

12 June 1970 (Athens, Greece)

- FIBA European Selection Team vs. (Italy) Fides Napoli: 85–92 (overtime)

14 June 1970 (Athens, Greece)

- FIBA European Selection Team vs. (Greece) AEK Athens: 100–74

FIBA European Selection roster: Krešimir Ćosić (Yugoslavia), Nikola Plećaš (Yugoslavia), Ljubodrag Simonović (Yugoslavia), Dragutin Čermak (Yugoslavia), Dragan Kapičić (Yugoslavia), Clifford Luyk (Spain), Francisco "Nino" Buscato (Spain), Vicente Ramos (Spain), Massimo Masini (Italy), Georgios Kolokithas (Greece). Head Coaches: Witold Zagórski (Poland) & Faidon Matthaiou (Greece)

=== FIBA Europe All-Star Festival V ===
5 June 1971 (Rome, Italy)

- FIBA European Selection Team vs. (Italy) Italian National Team: 96–64

FIBA European Selection Team roster: Krešimir Ćosić (Yugoslavia), Petar Skansi (Yugoslavia), Ljubodrag Simonović (Yugoslavia), Sergei Belov (USSR), Alexander "Sasha" Belov (USSR), Modestas Paulauskas (USSR), Clifford Luyk (Spain), Francisco "Nino" Buscato (Spain), Jiří Zedníček (Czechoslovakia), Edward Jurkiewicz (Poland), Grzegorz Korcz (Poland). Head Coach: Witold Zagórski (Poland)

=== FIBA Europe All-Star Festival VI ===
17 June 1972 (Zagreb, Yugoslavia)

- FIBA European Selection Team vs. United States National Team "Team USA": 102–75

19 June 1972 (Geneva, Switzerland)

- FIBA European Selection Team vs. United States National Team "Team USA": 88–61

21 June 1972 (Vigo, Spain)

- FIBA European Selection Team vs. United States National Team "Team USA": 78–64

23 June 1972 (Le Touquet, France)

- FIBA European Selection Team vs. United States National Team "Team USA": 99–85

FIBA European Selection Team roster: Krešimir Ćosić (Yugoslavia), Nikola Plećaš (Yugoslavia), Ljubodrag Simonović (Yugoslavia), Sergei Belov (USSR), Alexander "Sasha" Belov (USSR), Modestas Paulauskas (USSR), Alzhan Zharmukhamedov (USSR), Ivan Edeshko (USSR), Clifford Luyk (Spain), Jiří Zedníček (Czechoslovakia), Ottorino Flaborea (Italy), Georgi Khristov (Bulgaria). Head Coach: Witold Zagórski (Poland)

=== FIBA Europe All-Star Festival VII ===
14 June 1973 (Badalona, Spain)

- FIBA European Selection Team vs. (Spain) Juventud Schweppes Badalona: 107–97

16 June 1973 (Barcelona, Spain)

- FIBA European Selection Team vs. (Spain) Real Madrid: 95–98

FIBA European Selection Team roster: Krešimir Ćosić (Yugoslavia), Vinko Jelovac (Yugoslavia), Rato Tvrdić (Yugoslavia), Emiliano Rodríguez (Spain), Francisco "Nino" Buscato (Spain), Dino Meneghin (Italy), Massimo Masini (Italy), Ivan Edeshko (USSR), Jean-Pierre Staelens (France), Andrzej Seweryn (Poland). Head Coaches: Witold Zagórski (Poland) & Faidon Matthaiou (Greece)

=== FIBA Europe All-Star Festival VIII ===
26 September 1974 (Rio de Janeiro, Brazil)

- FIBA European Selection Team vs. FIBA Americas All-Stars: 94–85

28 September 1974 (São Paulo, Brazil)

- FIBA European Selection Team vs. FIBA Americas All-Stars: 103–99

1 October 1974 (Brussels, Belgium)

- FIBA European Selection Team vs. FIBA Americas All-Stars: 103–90

4 October 1974 (Rome, Italy)

- FIBA European Selection Team vs. FIBA Americas All-Stars: 85–87

FIBA European Selection Team roster: Dino Meneghin (Italy), Pierlo Marzorati (Italy), Sergei Belov (USSR), Krešimir Ćosić (Yugoslavia), Vinko Jelovac (Yugoslavia), Damir Šolman (Yugoslavia), Wayne Brabender (Spain), Luis Miguel Santillana (Spain), Jacques Cachemire (France), Vassilis Goumas (Greece). Head Coach: Giancarlo Primo (Italy)

=== FIBA Europe All-Star Festival IX ===
22 June 1975 (Tel Aviv, Israel)

- FIBA European Selection Team vs. (Israel) Maccabi Tel Aviv: 115–88

FIBA European Selection Team roster: Dino Meneghin (Italy), Pierlo Marzorati (Italy), Renzo Bariviera (Italy), Ivan Bisson (Italy), Wayne Brabender (Spain), Luis Miguel Santillana (Spain), Carmelo Cabrera (Spain), Jacques Cachemire (France), Etienne Geerts (Belgium), Imre Nytrai (Belgium). Head Coach: Giancarlo Primo (Italy)

=== FIBA Europe All-Star Festival X ===
15 September 1976 (Cairo, Egypt)

- FIBA European Selection Team vs. (Egypt) Egyptian National Team: 97–71

17 September 1976 (Cairo, Egypt)

- FIBA European Selection Team vs. (Egypt) Egyptian National Team: 118–80

FIBA European Selection Team roster: Dragan Kićanović (Yugoslavia), Zoran Slavnić (Yugoslavia), Željko Jerkov (Yugoslavia), Juan Antonio Corbalán (Spain), Wayne Brabender (Spain), Luis Miguel Santillana (Spain), Rafael Rullán (Spain), Pierlo Marzorati (Italy), Ivan Bisson (Italy), Renzo Bariviera (Italy). Head Coach: Giancarlo Primo (Italy)

=== FIBA Europe All-Star Festival XI ===
3 May 1977 (Split, Yugoslavia)

- FIBA European Selection Team vs. (Socialist Federal Republic of Yugoslavia) Jugoplastika Split: 116–108

FIBA European Selection Team roster: Pierlo Marzorati (Italy), Fabrizio Della Fiori (Italy), Gianni Bertolotti (Italy), Renzo Bariviera (Italy), Juan Antonio Corbalán (Spain), Rafael Rullán (Spain), Manuel Flores (Spain), Kamil Brabenec (Czechoslovakia), Zdenek Kos (Czechoslovakia), Atanas Golomeev (Bulgaria), Etienne Geerts (Belgium). Head Coach: Antonio Díaz-Miguel (Spain)

=== FIBA Europe All-Star Festival XII ===
2 July 1978 (Madrid, Spain)

- FIBA European Selection Team vs. (Spain) Real Madrid: 102–119

FIBA European Selection Team roster: Mirza Delibašić (Yugoslavia), Dražen Dalipagić (Yugoslavia), Dragan Kićanović (Yugoslavia), Željko Jerkov (Yugoslavia), Dino Meneghin (Italy), Renzo Bariviera (Italy), Lorenzo Carraro (Italy), Miki Berkovich (Israel), Tal Brody (Israel), Kamil Brabenec (Czechoslovakia), Luis Miguel Santillana (Spain). Head Coach: Antonio Díaz-Miguel (Spain)

=== FIBA Europe All-Star Festival XIII ===
26 June 1979 (Prievidza, Czechoslovakia)

- FIBA European Selection Team vs. (Czechoslovakia) Czechoslovak National Team: 99–89

28 June 1979 (Bratislava, Czechoslovakia)

- FIBA European Selection Team vs. (Czechoslovakia) Czechoslovak National Team: 82–79

FIBA European Selection Team roster: Vladimir Tkachenko (USSR), Anatoli Myshkin (USSR), Alexander Belostenny (USSR), Stanislav Yeryomin (USSR), Wayne Brabender (Spain), Juan Antonio Corbalán (Spain), Rafael Rullán (Spain), Ratko Radovanović (Yugoslavia), Jacques Cachemire (France), Carlo Caglieris (Italy), Lorenzo Carraro (Italy). Head Coach: Aca Nikolić (Yugoslavia)

=== FIBA Europe All-Star Exhibition Games IV ===
(Tal Brody's farewell game:)

4 September 1980 (Tel Aviv, Israel)

- FIBA European Selection Team - (Israel) Maccabi Tel Aviv: 92–93

FIBA European Selection Team roster: Juan Antonio San Epifanio "Epi" (Spain), Juan Antonio Corbalán (Spain), Wayne Brabender (Spain), Juan Domingo de la Cruz (Spain), Dino Meneghin (Italy), Renato Villalta (Italy), Fabrizio Della Fiori (Italy), Panagiotis Giannakis (Greece), Hervé Dubuisson (France), Klaus Zander (Germany). Head Coach: Lolo Sainz (Spain)

=== FIBA Europe All-Star Festival XIV ===
7 June 1981 (Kraków, Poland)

- FIBA European Selection Team vs. (Poland) Wisła Kraków: 121–81

Wisła Kraków roster: Zbigniew Kudłacz, Jerzy Bińkowski, Wojciech Rosiński, Piotr Wielebnowski, Janusz Seweryn, Andrzej Seweryn, Stanisław Zgłobicki, Marek Żochowski, Mieczysław Młynarski, Zbigniew Bogucki, Jacek Międzik, Krzysztof Fikiel. Trener: Jan Mikułowski

FIBA European Selection Team roster: Mirza Delibašić (Yugoslavia), Dražen Dalipagić (Yugoslavia), Dragan Kićanović (Yugoslavia), Pierlo Marzorati (Italy), Renato Villalta (Italy), Juan Antonio Corbalán (Spain), Rafael Rullán (Spain), Juan Domingo de la Cruz (Spain), Stano Kropilák (Czechoslovakia), Zdenek Kos (Czechoslovakia), Stanislav Yeryomin (USSR), Éric Beugnot (France). Head Coach: Antonio Díaz-Miguel (Spain)

=== FIBA Europe All-Star Exhibition Games V ===
5 September 1981 (Ankara, Turkey)

- FIBA European Selection Team - (Turkey) Turkish National Team: 121–106

9 September 1981 (Badalona, Spain)

- FIBA European Selection Team - (Spain) Joventut Sony Badalona: 125–120

22 September 1981 (Caserta, Italy)

- FIBA European Selection Team - Soviet Union National Team: 64–90

FIBA European Selection Team roster: Dražen Dalipagić (Yugoslavia), Mirza Delibašić (Yugoslavia), Juan Antonio Corbalán (Spain), Juan Domingo de la Cruz (Spain), Rafael Rullán (Spain), Miki Berkovich (Israel), Lou Silver (Israel), Stano Kropilák (Czechoslovakia), Mieczysław Młynarski (Poland), Efe Aydan (Turkey), Éric Beugnot (France). Head Coach: Antonio Díaz-Miguel (Spain)

=== FIBA Europe All-Star Festival XV ===
18 June 1982 (Geneva, Switzerland)

- FIBA European Selection Team vs. United States National Team "Team USA": 111–92

20 June 1982 (Budapest, Hungary)

- FIBA European Selection Team vs. United States National Team "Team USA": 103–88

FIBA European Selection Team roster: Dražen Dalipagić (Yugoslavia), Željko Jerkov (Yugoslavia), Vladimir Tkachenko (USSR), Anatoli Myshkin (USSR), Pierlo Marzorati (Italy), Juan Antonio San Epifanio "Epi" (Spain), Juan Antonio Corbalán (Spain), Juan Domingo De la Cruz (Spain), Miki Berkovich (Israel), Stano Kropilák (Czechoslovakia), Arpad Losonczy (Hungary). Head Coach: Antonio Díaz-Miguel (Spain)

=== FIBA Europe All-Star Exhibition Games VI ===
(Lou Silver's farewell game:)

17 June 1987 (Tel Aviv, Israel)

- FIBA European Selection Team - (Israel) Maccabi Tel Aviv: 108–87

(Vassilis Goumas' farewell game:)

19 June 1987 (Thessaloniki, Greece)

- FIBA European Selection Team - (Greece) Greek National Team: 109–101

FIBA European Selection Team roster: Dražen Petrović 23, Antonello Riva 19, Rik Smits 16, Walter Magnifico 12, Stojko Vranković 5, Richard Dacoury 10, Doron Jamchi 16, Stano Kropilák 8. Head Coach: Pavel Petera (Czechoslovakia)

Greek National Team roster: Nikos Galis 47, Panagiotis Giannakis 15, Fanis Christodoulou 10, Panagiotis Fasoulas 6, Argyris Kambouris 8, Liveris Andritsos 3, Memos Ioannou 8, Nikos Stavropoulos 4. Head Coach: Kostas Politis (Greece)

21 June 1987 (Sofia, Bulgaria)

- FIBA European Selection Team - (Bulgaria) Bulgarian National Team: 129–82

FIBA European Selection Team roster: Dražen Petrović (Yugoslavia), Stojko Vranković (Yugoslavia), Nikos Galis (Greece), Panagiotis Giannakis (Greece), Antonello Riva (Italy), Walter Magnifico (Italy), Miki Berkovich (Israel), Doron Jamchi (Israel), Richard Dacoury (France), Stano Kropilák (Czechoslovakia), Rik Smits (Netherlands). Head Coach: Pavel Petera (Czechoslovakia)

=== FIBA Europe All-Star Exhibition Games VII ===
27 December 1990 (Split, Yugoslavia)

- FIBA European Selection Team - (Socialist Federal Republic of Yugoslavia) Pop 84 Split: 104–102

FIBA European Selection Team roster: Panagiotis Giannakis (Greece), Panagiotis Fasoulas (Greece), Doron Jamchi (Israel), Jordi Villacampa (Spain), José Montero (Spain), Andro Knego (Yugoslavia), Jure Zdovc (Yugoslavia), Stéphane Ostrowski (France), Stefano Rusconi (Italy). Head Coach: Aíto García Reneses ("Aíto") (Spain)

=== FIBA Europe All-Star Exhibition Game VIII ===
(The 1991 FIBA Centennial Jubilee, FIBA's commemorative game, celebrating the 100th Anniversary of the creation of the sport of basketball, in 1891, by James Naismith.

8 June 1991 (Piraeus, Greece)

- FIBA European Selection Team - FIBA Balkans Selection Team: 102–103

FIBA European Selection Team roster: Juan Antonio San Epifanio "Epi" (Spain), Jordi Villacampa (Spain), Antonio Martín (Spain), Antonello Riva (Italy), Walter Magnifico (Italy), Roberto Brunamonti (Italy), Richard Dacoury (France), Stéphane Ostrowski (France), Philippe Szanyiel (France), Sergei Bazarevich (Russia), Igors Miglinieks (Latvia), Andrejs Bondarenko (Latvia). Head Coach: Sandro Gamba (Italy)

FIBA Balkans Selection Team roster: Toni Kukoč (Yugoslavia), Dino Rađja (Yugoslavia), Žarko Paspalj (Yugoslavia), Jure Zdovc (Yugoslavia), Zoran Savić (Yugoslavia), Nikos Galis (Greece), Panagiotis Giannakis (Greece), Panagiotis Fasoulas (Greece), Fanis Christodoulou (Greece), Georgi Glouchkov (Bulgaria), Hüsnü Çakırgil (Bulgaria), Sorin Ardelean (Romania). Head Coach: Kostas Politis (Greece)

=== FIBA Europe All-Star Exhibition Games IX ===
12 September 1991 (Cantù, Italy)

- FIBA European Selection Team - (Italy) Clear Cantù: 144–115

27 December 1991 (Paris, France)

- FIBA European Selection Team - (France) French National Team: 102–83

FIBA European Selection Team roster: Toni Kukoč (Croatia), Žarko Paspalj (Yugoslavia), Dino Rađja (Croatia), Jure Zdovc (Slovenia), Oscar Schmidt (Brazil), Antonello Riva (Italy), Walter Magnifico (Italy), Nando Gentile (Italy), Richard Dacoury (France), Antoine Rigaudeau (France), Stéphane Ostrowski (France), Doron Jamchi (Israel), Panagiotis Fasoulas (Greece). Head Coach: Sandro Gamba (Italy)

=== FIBA Europe All-Star Exhibition Games X ===
(Juan Antonio San Epifanio ("Epi")'s farewell game:)

26 December 1995 (Barcelona, Spain)

- FIBA European Selection Team - (Spain) FC Barcelona: 118–92

FIBA European Selection Team roster: Jordi Villacampa (Spain), Alberto Herreros (Spain), Rafa Jofresa (Spain), José Antúnez (Spain), Stéphane Ostrowski (France), Doron Jamchi (Israel), Teo Alibegović (Slovenia), Andrei Fetisov (Russia), Mikhail Mikhailov (Russia), Gus Binelli (Italy). Head Coach: Mirko Novosel (Croatia)

=== FIBA Europe All-Star Exhibition Games XI ===
(Miki Berkovich's farewell game:)

28 December 1995 (Tel Aviv, Israel)

- FIBA European Selection Team - (Israel) Maccabi Tel Aviv: 120–89

FIBA European Selection Team roster: Artūras Karnišovas (Lithuania), Sergei Bazarevich (Russia), Teo Alibegović (Slovenia), Panagiotis Fasoulas (Greece), Stéphane Ostrowski (France), Sašha Obradović (Yugoslavia), Georgios Sigalas (Greece), Veljko Mršić (Croatia), Evgeni Kisurin (Russia), Ronny Bayer (Belgium). Head Coach: Mirko Novosel (Croatia)

=== FIBA Europe All-Star Exhibition Games XII ===
(In honor of the 50th Anniversary of the formation of the Cibona Zagreb club:)

28 December 1996 (Zagreb, Croatia)

- FIBA European Selection Team - (Croatia) Cibona Zagreb: 93–92 (47–49)

FIBA European Selection Team roster: Teo Alibegović (Slovenia) 17 points, Sergei Bazarevich (Russia) 14 points, Gus Binelli (Italy) 0 points, Stéphane Ostrowski (France) 15 points, Evgeni Kisurin (Russia - played for Cibona Zagreb), Walter Magnifico (Italy) 0 points, Petar Naumoski (FYROM/Turkey) 18 points, Rimas Kurtinaitis (Lithuania) 10 points, Georgi Mladenov (Bulgaria) 4 points, Nadav Henefeld (Israel) 3 points, Igor Kudelin (Russia) 10 points, Adam Wojcik (Poland) 2 points. Head Coach: Lolo Sainz (Spain)

Cibona Zagreb roster: Damir Mulaomerović (Croatia) 5 points, Slaven Rimac (Croatia) 22 points, Davor Marcelić (Croatia) 1 point, Evgeni Kisurin (Russia) 13 points, Ivan Grgat (Croatia) 1 point, Zdravko Radulović (Croatia) 10 points, Alan Gregov (Croatia) 9 points, Mate Skelin (Croatia) 19 points, Dževad Alihodžić (Bosnia) 4 points, Gordan Giricek (Croatia) 8 points. Head Coach: Jasmin Repeša (Croatia)

=== FIBA Europe All-Star Exhibition Games XIII ===
5 July 1998

- FIBA European Selection Team - (France) French National Team: 83–77 (49–32)

FIBA European Selection Team roster: Teo Alibegović (Slovenia) 27 points, Veljko Mršić (Croatia) 10 points, Oded Katash (Israel) 7 points, Denis Marconato (Italy) 11 points, Roger Esteller (Spain) 1 point, Róbert Gulyás (Hungary) 2 points, Jean-Marc Jaumin (Belgium) 0 points, Sasha Djordjević (FR Yugoslavia) 11 points, Luboš Bartoň (Czech Republic) 14 points. Head Coach:

French National Team roster: Antoine Rigaudeau 15 points, Frederic Weis 2 points, Cyril Julian 15 points, Laurent Sciarra 13 points, Makan Dioumassi 1 point, Aumeric Jeanneau 7 points, Stéphane Risacher 24 points. Head Coach:

== Players with multiple FIBA European Selection Team selections ==
- Player nationalities listed by national team affiliation.

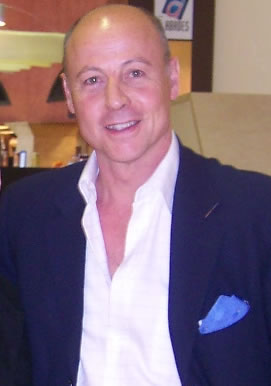
Spanish player Juan Antonio Corbalan, was named to the FIBA European Selection Team, a record 7 times, by FIBA Europe.

Player	Number of selections	Years selected
(Spain) Juan Antonio Corbalán	7	1976, 1977, 1979, 1980, 1981 (2×), 1982
(Socialist Federal Republic of Yugoslavia) Krešimir Ćosić	6	1968, 1970, 1971, 1972, 1973, 1974
(France) Stéphane Ostrowski	6	1990, 1991 (2×), 1995 (2×), 1996
(Czechoslovakia) Jiří Zedníček	5	1966, 1967, 1969, 1971, 1972
(Spain) Nino Buscató	5	1968, 1969, 1970, 1971, 1973
(Spain) Wayne Brabender	5	1974, 1975, 1976, 1979, 1980
(Italy) Pierlo Marzorati	5	1975, 1976, 1977, 1981, 1982
(Spain) Rafael Rullán	5	1976, 1977, 1979, 1981 (2×)
(Italy) Massimo Masini	4	1967, 1968, 1970, 1973
(Spain) Clifford Luyk	4	1969, 1970, 1971, 1972
(Soviet Union) Sergei Belov	4	1969, 1971, 1972, 1974
(Spain) Luis Miguel Santillana	4	1974, 1975, 1976, 1978
(Italy) Renzo Bariviera	4	1975, 1976, 1977, 1978
(Socialist Federal Republic of Yugoslavia) Dražen Dalipagić	4	1978, 1981 (2×), 1982
(Israel) Miki Berkovich	4	1978, 1981, 1982, 1987
(Spain) Juan Domingo de la Cruz	4	1980, 1981 (2×), 1982
(Greece) Panagiotis Giannakis	4	1980, 1987, 1990, 1991
(Czechoslovakia) Stano Kropilák	4	1981 (2×), 1982, 1987
(Israel) Doron Jamchi	4	1987, 1990, 1991, 1995
(Italy) Walter Magnifico	4	1987, 1991 (2×), 1996
(Greece) Panagiotis Fasoulas	4	1990, 1991 (2×), 1995
(Slovenia) Teo Alibegović	4	1995 (2×), 1996, 1998
(Socialist Federal Republic of Yugoslavia) Radivoj Korać	3	1964, 1965 (2×)
(Greece) Georgios Trontzos	3	1965 (2×), 1967
(Czechoslovakia) František Konvička	3	1965 (2×), 1968
(Czechoslovakia) Vladimír Pištělák	3	1965 (2×), 1968
(Spain) Emiliano Rodríguez	3	1966, 1969, 1973
(Soviet Union) Modestas Paulauskas	3	1969, 1971, 1972
(Socialist Federal Republic of Yugoslavia) Ljubodrag Simonović	3	1970, 1971, 1972
(France) Jacques Cachemire	3	1974, 1975, 1979
(Italy) Dino Meneghin	3	1975, 1978, 1980
(Socialist Federal Republic of Yugoslavia) Dragan Kićanović	3	1976, 1978, 1981
(Socialist Federal Republic of Yugoslavia) Željko Jerkov	3	1976, 1978, 1982
(Socialist Federal Republic of Yugoslavia) Mirza Delibašić	3	1978, 1981 (2×)
(Spain) Juan Antonio San Epifanio "Epi"	3	1980, 1982, 1991
(France) Richard Dacoury	3	1987, 1991 (2×)
(Italy) Antonello Riva	3	1987, 1991 (2×)
(Socialist Federal Republic of Yugoslavia) Jure Zdovc	3	1990, 1991 (2×)
(Spain) Jordi Villacampa	3	1990, 1991, 1995
(Russia) Sergei Bazarevich	3	1991, 1995, 1996
(Israel) Tani Cohen-Mintz	2	1964, 1965
(Czechoslovakia) Jan Bobrovský	2	1965 (2×)
(Italy) Sauro Bufalini	2	1965 (2×)
(Italy) Nino Cescutti	2	1965 (2×)
(France) Henri Grange	2	1965 (2×)
(Finland) Martti Liimo	2	1965 (2×)
(Socialist Federal Republic of Yugoslavia) Trajko Rajković	2	1965 (2×)
(Czechoslovakia) Jiří Zídek Sr.	2	1966, 1967
(Socialist Federal Republic of Yugoslavia) Nikola Plećaš	2	1970, 1972
(Soviet Union) Sasha Belov	2	1971, 1972
(Soviet Union) Ivan Edeshko	2	1972, 1973
(Socialist Federal Republic of Yugoslavia) Vinko Jelovac	2	1973, 1974
(Italy) Ivan Bisson	2	1975, 1976
(Belgium) Etienne Geerts	2	1975, 1977
(Czechoslovakia) Kamil Brabenec	2	1977, 1978
(Italy) Fabrizio Della Fiori	2	1977, 1980
(Czechoslovakia) Zdeněk Kos	2	1977, 1981
(Italy) Lorenzo Carraro	2	1978, 1979
(Soviet Union) Stanislav Yeryomin	2	1979, 1981
(Soviet Union) Anatoly Myshkin	2	1979, 1982
(Soviet Union) Vladimir Tkachenko	2	1979, 1982
(Italy) Renato Villalta	2	1980, 1981
(France) Éric Beugnot	2	1981 (2×)
(Netherlands) Rik Smits	2	1987 (2×)
(Greece) Nikos Galis	2	1987, 1991
(Socialist Federal Republic of Yugoslavia) Toni Kukoč	2	1991 (2×)
(Socialist Federal Republic of Yugoslavia) Žarko Paspalj	2	1991 (2×)
(Socialist Federal Republic of Yugoslavia) Dino Rađja	2	1991 (2×)
(Italy) Gus Binelli	2	1995, 1996
(Russia) Evgeni Kisurin	2	1995, 1996
(Croatia) Veljko Mršić	2	1995, 1998

== FIBA European Selection Team selections by head coach ==
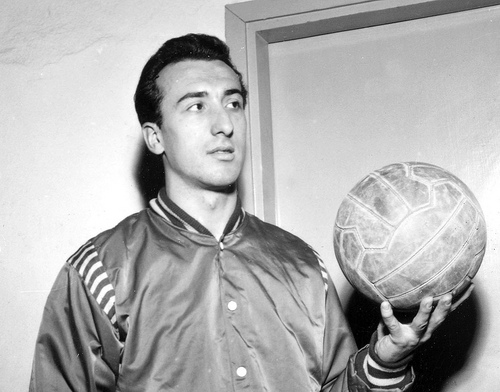
Italian basketball coach Sandro Gamba, was the head coach of the FIBA European Selection Team, on two occasions.

Head coach	Number of selections	Years selected
(Poland) Witold Zagórski	7	1967, 1968, 1969, 1970, 1971, 1972, 1973
(Czechoslovakia) Miloslav Kříž	6	1964, 1965 (2×), 1966, 1967, 1968
(Spain) Antonio Díaz-Miguel	5	1977, 1978, 1981 (2×), 1982
(France) Robert Busnel	3	1964, 1966, 1967
(Italy) Giancarlo Primo	3	1974, 1975, 1976
(Italy) Nello Paratore	2	1965 (2×)
(Greece) Faidon Matthaiou	2	1970, 1973
(Spain) Lolo Sainz	2	1980, 1996
(Italy) Sandro Gamba	2	1991 (2×)
(Croatia) Mirko Novosel	2	1995 (2×)
(Socialist Federal Republic of Yugoslavia) Aca Nikolić	1	1979
(Czechoslovakia) Pavel Petera	1	1987
(Spain) Aíto García Reneses	1	1990
(Greece) Kostas Politis	1	1991
(Croatia) Jasmin Repeša	1	1996

== FIBA European Selection Team player distinctions ==
=== Basketball Hall of Fame ===
- (Soviet Union) Sergei Belov
- (Socialist Federal Republic of Yugoslavia) Krešimir Ćosić
- (Socialist Federal Republic of Yugoslavia) Dražen Dalipagić
- (United States) (Greece) Nikos Galis
- (Italy) Sandro Gamba
- (Socialist Federal Republic of Yugoslavia) Radivoj Korać
- (Croatia) Toni Kukoč
- (Italy) Dino Meneghin
- (Socialist Federal Republic of Yugoslavia) Aca Nikolić
- (Croatia) Dražen Petrović
- (Croatia) Dino Radja
- (Brazil) Oscar Schmidt

=== FIBA Hall of Fame ===
- (Soviet Union) Sergei Belov
- (Israel) Miki Berkovich
- (Socialist Federal Republic of Yugoslavia) Krešimir Ćosić
- (Socialist Federal Republic of Yugoslavia) Dražen Dalipagić
- (Socialist Federal Republic of Yugoslavia) Mirza Delibašić
- (Greece) Panos Fasoulas
- (United States) (Greece) Nikos Galis
- (Greece) Panagiotis Giannakis
- (Socialist Federal Republic of Yugoslavia) Dragan Kićanović
- (Socialist Federal Republic of Yugoslavia) Radivoj Korać
- (Czechoslovakia) Stano Kropilák
- (Croatia) Toni Kukoč
- (Italy) Pierlo Marzorati
- (Italy) Dino Meneghin
- (Socialist Federal Republic of Yugoslavia) Aca Nikolić
- (Soviet Union) Modestas Paulauskas
- (Socialist Federal Republic of Yugoslavia) Dražen Petrović
- (France) Antoine Rigaudeau
- (Spain) Juan Antonio San Epifanio
- (Brazil) Oscar Schmidt
- (Socialist Federal Republic of Yugoslavia) Zoran Slavnić
- (Soviet Union) Vladimir Tkachenko
- (Czechoslovakia) Jiří Zídek Sr.

=== FIBA's 50 Greatest Players (1991) ===
- (Soviet Union) Sasha Belov
- (Soviet Union) Sergei Belov
- (Israel) Miki Berkovich
- (United States) (Spain) Wayne Brabender
- (Spain) Nino Buscató
- (Spain) Juan Antonio Corbalán
- (Socialist Federal Republic of Yugoslavia) Krešimir Ćosić
- (Socialist Federal Republic of Yugoslavia) Dražen Dalipagić
- (Socialist Federal Republic of Yugoslavia) Ivo Daneu
- (Socialist Federal Republic of Yugoslavia) Mirza Delibašić
- (United States) (Greece) Nikos Galis
- (Bulgaria) Atanas Golomeev
- (Socialist Federal Republic of Yugoslavia) Dragan Kićanović
- (Greece) Giorgos Kolokithas
- (Socialist Federal Republic of Yugoslavia) Radivoj Korać
- (Czechoslovakia) Stano Kropilák
- (Croatia) Toni Kukoč
- (United States) (Spain) Cliff Luyk
- (Italy) Pierlo Marzorati
- (Italy) Massimo Masini
- (Italy) Dino Meneghin
- (Soviet Union) Anatoly Myshkin
- (Soviet Union) Modestas Paulauskas
- (Socialist Federal Republic of Yugoslavia) Dražen Petrović
- (Croatia) Dino Radja
- (Italy) Antonello Riva
- (Spain) Emiliano Rodriguez
- (Spain) Juan Antonio San Epifanio
- (Brazil) Oscar Schmidt
- (Socialist Federal Republic of Yugoslavia) Petar Skansi
- (Socialist Federal Republic of Yugoslavia) Zoran Slavnić
- (Belgium) Willy Steveniers

=== 50 Greatest EuroLeague Contributors (2008) ===
- (Soviet Union) Sergei Belov
- (Israel) Miki Berkovich
- (United States) (Spain) Wayne Brabender
- (Spain) Juan Antonio Corbalán
- (Socialist Federal Republic of Yugoslavia) Krešimir Ćosić
- (Socialist Federal Republic of Yugoslavia) Dražen Dalipagić
- (Socialist Federal Republic of Yugoslavia) Mirza Delibašić
- (United States) (Greece) Nikos Galis
- (Greece) Panagiotis Giannakis
- (Socialist Federal Republic of Yugoslavia) Radivoj Korać
- (Croatia) Toni Kukoč
- (United States) (Spain) Cliff Luyk
- (Italy) Pierlo Marzorati
- (Italy) Dino Meneghin
- (Socialist Federal Republic of Yugoslavia) Dražen Petrović
- (Croatia) Dino Radja
- (Italy) Antonello Riva
- (Spain) Emiliano Rodriguez
- (Spain) Juan Antonio San Epifanio

== FIBA European Selection Team head coach distinctions ==
=== Basketball Hall of Fame ===
- (Spain) Antonio Díaz-Miguel
- (Italy) Sandro Gamba
- (Socialist Federal Republic of Yugoslavia) Aca Nikolić
- (Socialist Federal Republic of Yugoslavia) Mirko Novosel

=== FIBA Hall of Fame ===
- (France) Robert Busnel
- (Spain) Antonio Díaz-Miguel
- (Socialist Federal Republic of Yugoslavia) Aca Nikolić
- (Socialist Federal Republic of Yugoslavia) Mirko Novosel
- (Italy) Giancarlo Primo

=== 50 Greatest EuroLeague Contributors (2008) ===
- (Socialist Federal Republic of Yugoslavia) Aca Nikolić
- (Spain) Lolo Sainz

== See also ==
- FIBA EuroStars
- FIBA EuroLeague All-Final Four Team
- All-EuroLeague Team
