= FIBA's 50 Greatest Players (1991) =

International basket list

FIBA's 50 Greatest Players (1991), or 50 Greatest FIBA Players (1991), is the list of the 50 greatest players in the history of FIBA international basketball competition, as selected in 1991, by FIBA's official monthly magazine publication, FIBA Basket.

== History ==
=== Background ===
In June 1991, FIBA organised the Jubilee Game, between the European Select Team and the Balkan Select team in Piraeus, Greece, to commemorate the 100-year anniversary of the sport of basketball. A few months earlier, the monthly magazine FIBA Basket, the Federation's official publication, was issued for first time.

=== Process ===
The list was created in honor of the 100th anniversary of the creation of the sport of basketball, by James Naismith. FIBA had a group of international basketball experts, composed mainly of international basketball coaches, vote for the 50 greatest players list. Each expert voter was tasked with picking 25 players. The voting was tallied as, 25 points for a 1st place vote, 24 points for a 2nd place vote, and so on. There were 51 players selected, as a result of a tie in the vote totals. Players from all over the world were considered to be eligible for the voting, including NBA players.

Five European players that had played in the NBA up to that time made the list (Divac, Petrović, Marčiulionis, Volkov, and Martín). However, no U.S.A. NBA players made the list, because they were not competing in major FIBA-organized tournaments until the 1992 Summer Olympics. Nonetheless, 5 players with U.S.A. citizenship that played in leagues other than the NBA, did make the list (Brabender, Luyk, Galis, Cruz, and Morse).

The voting results were published in the FIBA Basket monthly magazine, which was in circulation from 1991, until the end of the 20th century.

== List of inductees ==
Key:

Also elected to the FIBA Hall of Fame

Inductee	Nationality	Pos.	Achievements	Ref.
Alexander Belov	Soviet Union; Russia	C	List of achievements: 1× Olympic Games gold medalist (1972); 1× Olympic Games bronze medalist (1976); 1× FIBA World Cup gold medalist (1974); 1× FIBA World Cup bronze medalist (1970); 2× EuroBasket gold medalist (1969, 1971); 1× EuroBasket silver medalist (1975); 2× FIBA Saporta Cup champion (1973, 1975); 1× Soviet League champion (1975); 2× FIBA European Selection (1971, 1972)	
Sergei Belov	Soviet Union; Russia	SG	List of achievements: 1× Olympic Games gold medalist (1972); 3× Olympic Games bronze medalist (1968, 1976, 1980); 2× FIBA World Cup gold medalist (1967, 1974); 1× FIBA World Cup silver medalist (1978); 1× FIBA World Cup bronze medalist (1970); 4× EuroBasket gold medalist (1967, 1969, 1971, 1979); 2× EuroBasket silver medalist (1975, 1977); 1× EuroBasket bronze medalist (1973); 2× EuroLeague champion (1969, 1971); 11× USSR League champion (1969–1974, 1976–1980); 2× USSR Cup winner (1972, 1973); FIBA Order of Merit (1995); FIBA World Cup MVP (1970); FIBA EuroBasket MVP (1969); 50 Greatest EuroLeague Contributors (2008); 3× EuroLeague Finals Top Scorer (1970, 1971, 1973); 4× FIBA European Selection (1969, 1971, 1972, 1974); Honoured Master of Sports of the USSR (1968); Order of the Badge of Honour; Medal "For Distinguished Labour"	
Miki Berkovich	Israel	SG	List of achievements: FIBA Intercontinental Cup champion (1980); 2× EuroLeague champion (1977, 1981); 4× FIBA European All-Star (1978, 1981, 1982, 1987); 16× Israeli League champion (1972–1975, 1977–1988); 13× Israeli Cup winner (1972, 1973, 1975, 1977–1983, 1985, 1986, 1987); EuroBasket MVP (1979); Israel's Top Sportsmen of the 50 Year Jubilee (1948–1998); 50 Greatest EuroLeague Contributors (2008)	
Jean-Paul Beugnot	France	PF/C	List of achievements: 2× French League champion (1958, 1960); 2× French Cup winner (1958, 1959); French League Best Scorer (1963); French National Sports Hall of Fame (2013); French Basketball Hall of Fame (2004)	
Wayne Brabender	Spain	SG/SF	List of achievements: 4× FIBA Intercontinental Cup champion (1976–1978, 1981); 4× EuroLeague champion (1968, 1974, 1978, 1980); 13× Spanish League champion (1968–1977, 1979, 1980, 1982); 7× Spanish Cup winner (1970–1975, 1977); 50 Greatest EuroLeague Contributors (2008); EuroBasket MVP (1973); 5× FIBA European Selection (1974–1976, 1979, 1980)	
Francisco "Nino" Buscató	Spain	PG	List of achievements: 5× FIBA European Selection (1968–1971, 1973); 2× Spanish League champion (1959, 1968); 2× Spanish Cup winner (1959, 1969)	
Stepas Butautas	Soviet Union; Lithuania		List of achievements: Olympic Games silver medalist (1968, 3× EuroBasket gold medal (1947, 1951, 1953); 2× Soviet League champion (1947, 1951); 6× Lithuanian SSR League champion (1945, 1950, 1952–1955)	
Juan Antonio Corbalán	Spain	PG	List of achievements: Olympic Games silver medalist (1984); 7× FIBA European Selection (1976, 1977, 1979, 1980, 1981 2×, 1982); EuroBasket MVP (1983); Spanish Sportsman of the Year (1983); 50 Greatest EuroLeague Contributors (2008); 4× FIBA Intercontinental Cup champion (1976–1978, 1981); 3× EuroLeague champion (1974, 1978, 1980); FIBA Saporta Cup champion (1984); FIBA Korać Cup champion (1988); 12× Spanish League champion (1972–1977, 1979, 1980, 1982 LEB, 1984–1986 ACB); 7× Spanish Cup winner (1972–1975, 1977, 1985, 1986)	
Krešimir Ćosić	Yugoslavia; Croatia	C	List of achievements: Olympic Games gold medalist (1980); 2x Olympic Games silver medalist (1968, 1976); 2× EuroBasket MVP (1971, 1975); 6× FIBA European Selection (1968, 1970–1974); FIBA Saporta Cup champion (1982); 2× Italian League champion (1979, 1980); 6× Yugoslav League champion (1965, 1967, 1968, 1974, 1975, 1982); 3× Yugoslav Cup winner (1981–1983); Croatian Sportsman of the Year (1980); 50 Greatest EuroLeague Contributors (2008); Croatian Lifetime Achievement in Sport (2002); FIBA Order of Merit (1994)	
Teófilo Cruz	Puerto Rico	C	List of achievements: Olympic Order; 2× BSN champion (1962, 1968); 4× BSN MVP (1962, 1967, 1970, 1971); 4× BSN scoring champion (1960–1962, 1971); 6× BSN Defensive Player of the Year (1964, 1966, 1969–1972); No. 13 retired by Cangrejeros de Santurce	
Dražen Dalipagić	Yugoslavia; Serbia	SF	List of achievements: Olympic Games gold medalist (1980); Olympic Games silver medalist (1976); Olympic Games bronze medalist (1984); 4× FIBA European Selection (1978, 1981 2×, 1982); 2× Yugoslav League champion (1976, 1979); Yugoslav Cup winner (1979); 2× FIBA Korać Cup champion (1978, 1979); 2× FIBA Korać Cup Finals Top Scorer (1974, 1978); Italian League Top Scorer (1988); FIBA EuroBasket MVP (1977); FIBA World Cup MVP (1978); The Best Athlete of Yugoslavia (1978); Yugoslav Sportsman of the Year (1978); 2× Mister Europa Player of the Year (1977, 1978); Euroscar Player of the Year (1980); 50 Greatest EuroLeague Contributors (2008)	
Ivo Daneu	Yugoslavia; Slovenia	PG	List of achievements: Olympic Games silver medalist (1968); FIBA World Cup MVP (1967); FIBA European Selection (1967); 6× Yugoslav League champion (1957, 1959, 1961, 1962, 1966, 1970); Yugoslav Sportsperson of the Year (1967); Slovenian Sportsperson of the Year (1969)	
Mirza Delibašić	Yugoslavia; Bosnia and Herzegovina	SG	List of achievements: Olympic Games gold medalist (1980); Olympic Games silver medalist (1976); 1979 EuroLeague Champion; 3× FIBA European Selection (1978, 1981 2×); Bosnia and Herzegovina Sportsman of the 20th century (2000); 50 Greatest EuroLeague Contributors (2008)	
Vlade Divac	Yugoslavia; Serbia	C	List of achievements: NBA All-Star (2001); NBA All-Rookie First Team (1990); J. Walter Kennedy Citizenship Award (2000); 2× FIBA World Cup champion (1990, 2002); 2× Olympic Games silver medalist (1988, 1996); 3× EuroBasket champion (1989, 1991, 1995); FIBA World Cup All-Tournament Team (1990); 2× EuroBasket All-Tournament Team (1991, 1995); Yugoslav League champion (1987); Yugoslav Cup champion (1989); FIBA Korać Cup champion (1989); Mister Europa Player of the Year (1989); 50 Greatest EuroLeague Contributors (2008); Olympic Order (2016)	
Ricardo Duarte	Peru	C	List of achievements: FIBA Summer Olympics Top Scorer (1964); FIBA World Cup Top Scorer (1963); Pan American Games Top Scorer (1963); 3× FIBA South American Championship Top Scorer (1963, 1966, 1968); Bolivarian Games Top Scorer (1965); Sports Laurels (Peru) (1985)	
Nikos Galis	Greece	SG	List of achievements: EuroBasket 1987 champion; 4× EuroBasket All-Tournament Team (1983, 1987, 1989, 1991); 4× EuroBasket Top Scorer (1983, 1987, 1989, 1991); 5× EuroLeague Top Scorer (1988–1990, 1994); FIBA World Cup Top Scorer (1986); EuroBasket MVP (1987)	
Andrew Gaze	Australia	SG	List of achievements: NBA champion (1999); 2× NBL champion (1993, 1997); 7× NBL MVP (1991, 1992, 1994–1998); 11× NBL All-Star (1988–1997, 2004); 2× NBL All-Star Game MVP (1989, 1992); 15× All-NBL First Team (1986–2000); All-NBL Second Team (2001); 8× NBL Most Efficient Player (1990–1997); NBL Rookie of the Year (1984); NBL 20th Anniversary Team (1998); NBL 25th Anniversary Team (2003); NBL 40th Anniversary Team (2018); 6× Gaze Medalist (1990, 1994–1996, 1998, 2000)	
Alain Gilles	France	SG/PG	List of achievements: Best French Player of the 20th Century; French National Sports Hall of Fame (2007); French Basketball Hall of Fame (2004); No. 4 retired by ASVEL; Legion of Honour; National Order of Merit (France); 8× French League champion (1966, 1968, 1969, 1971, 1972, 1975, 1977, 1981); 2× French Cup winner (1965, 1967); 3× French League Player of the Year (1965, 1967, 1968)	
Atanas Golomeev	Bulgaria	C	List of achievements: 2× FIBA EuroBasket Top Scorer (1973, 1975); FIBA European Selection (1977); 10× Bulgarian League champion (1967, 1968, 1970–1973, 1978, 1979, 1981, 1982); 4× Bulgarian Cup winner (1976, 1979, 1982, 1983)	
Dragan Kićanović	Yugoslavia; Serbia	SG	List of achievements: Olympic Games gold medal (1980); Olympic Games silver medal (1976); FIBA World Cup champion (1978); 3× EuroBasket (1973, 1975, 1977); EuroBasket All-Tournament Team (1979, 1981); 2× Korać Cup champion (1978–1979); Best Basketball Player of Yugoslavia in the 20th Century; FIBA World Cup MVP (1974); 2× Mr. Europa (1981, 1982); 2× Euroscar (1981, 1982); Best Athlete of Yugoslavia (1982); 3× FIBA European Selection (1976, 1978, 1981); FIBA Saporta Cup champion (1983); 3× Yugoslav League champion (1976, 1979, 1981); Yugoslav Cup winner (1979)	
Giorgos Kolokithas	Greece	SG/SF/PF	List of achievements: FIBA European OQT Top Scorer (1968); 2× EuroBasket Top Scorer (1967, 1969); FIBA European Selection (1970); 4× Greek League champion (1967, 1969, 1971, 1972); 3× Greek League Top Scorer (1964, 1966, 1967)	
Radivoj Korać	Yugoslavia; Serbia	PF	List of achievements: Olympic Games silver medalist (1968); EuroBasket MVP (1961); Best Athlete of Yugoslavia (1960); Yugoslav Sportsman of the Year (1962); 2× FIBA European Selection (1964, 1965); 7× Yugoslav League Top Scorer (1957, 1958, 1960, 1962–1965); Italian League Top Scorer (1969); Belgium League Top Scorer (1968); 4× Yugoslav League champion (1958, 1960, 1963, 1964); 2× Yugoslav Cup winner (1960, 1962); Belgium League champion (1968); 50 Greatest EuroLeague Contributors	
Otar Korkia	Soviet Union; Georgia	C	List of achievements: Olympic Games silver medalist (1952); 3× EuroBasket gold medal (1947, 1951, 1953); 3× Soviet League champion (1950, 1953, 1954); 2× Soviet Cup winner (1949, 1950); Honored Master of Sports of the USSR (1950); Order of Lenin (1957); Order of Honor (Georgia); Best Georgian Basketball Player of the 20th Century; Best Georgian Sportsman of the 20th Century	
Stano Kropilák	Czechoslovakia; Slovakia	PF/C	List of achievements: 4× FIBA European Selection (1981 2×, 1982, 1987); 5× Czechoslovak League champion (1979, 1980, 1983–1985); 5× Czechoslovak Player of the Year (1979, 1980, 1982, 1983, 1985); 10× Czechoslovak League All-Star Five (1976–1985); 10× Slovak Player of the Year (1975–1984); Best Slovak Player of the 20th Century (2000)	
Toni Kukoč	Yugoslavia; Croatia	SF/PF	List of achievements: 2x Olympic Games silver medal (1988, 1992); 3× NBA champion (1996–1998); NBA Sixth Man of the Year (1996); NBA All-Rookie Second Team (1994); FIBA World Championship MVP (1990); FIBA EuroBasket MVP (1991); 5× Euroscar Player of the Year (1990, 1991, 1994, 1996, 1998); 4× Mister Europa Player of the Year (1990–1992, 1996); 3× EuroLeague champion (1989–1991); 3× EuroLeague Final Four MVP (1990, 1991, 1993); EuroLeague Finals Top Scorer (1990); FIBA European Selection (1991); 50 Greatest EuroLeague Contributors (2008); Italian League champion (1992); Italian Cup winner (1993); 4× Yugoslav League champion (1988–1991); 2× Yugoslav Cup winner (1990, 1991); 3× Croatian Sportsman of the Year (1989–1991); Franjo Bučar State Award for Sport (1992); FIBA Under-19 World Cup MVP (1987)	
Clifford Luyk	Spain	PF/C	List of achievements: 3× FIBA Intercontinental Cup champion (1976–1978); 6× EuroLeague champion (1964, 1965, 1967, 1968, 1974, 1978); EuroLeague Finals Top Scorer (1965); 4× FIBA European Selection (1969–1972); 14× Spanish League champion (1963–1966, 1968–1977); 10× Spanish Cup winner (1965–1967, 1970–1975, 1977); Spanish League Top Scorer (1968); 50 Greatest EuroLeague Contributors (2008)	
Bira Maciel	Brazil	PF/C	List of achievements: Olympic Games bronze medalist (1964); 2× South American Club Champion (1964, 1969); 5× Brazilian Champion (1965, 1966, 1969, 1977, 1981); 8× São Paulo State champion (1964–1966, 1968, 1969, 1974, 1980, 1981); FIBA Order of Merit (1994)	
Šarūnas Marčiulionis	Soviet Union; Lithuania	SG	List of achievements: Olympic Games gold medal (1988); 2× Olympic Games bronze medal (1992, 1996); 4× Lithuanian Sportsman of the Year (1987, 1989–1991); Mr. Europa (1988); FIBA EuroBasket MVP (1995); FIBA EuroBasket Top Scorer (1995)	
Wlamir Marques	Brazil	SF	List of achievements: 2× Olympic Games bronze medalist (1960, 1964); FIBA World Cup MVP (1963); FIBA Intercontinental Test Cup champion (1965); Best Athlete of South America (1961); 2× South American Club Champion (1964, 1969); 3× Brazilian Champion (1965, 1966, 1969); 7× São Paulo State Champion (1957, 1960, 1964–1966, 1968, 1969)	
Fernando Martín	Spain	C/PF	List of achievements: Olympic Games silver medalist (1984); FIBA Club World Cup champion (1981); 3× FIBA European Super Cup champion (1984, 1988, 1989); 2× FIBA Saporta Cup champion (1984, 1989); FIBA Korać Cup champion (1988); 4× Spanish League champion (1982 LEB, 1984–1986 ACB); Spanish Supercup winner (1984); 3× Spanish King's Cup winner (1985, 1986, 1989)	
Pierluigi Marzorati	Italy	PG	List of achievements: Olympic Games silver medalist (1980); 2× FIBA Intercontinental Cup champion (1975, 1982); 2× EuroLeague champion (1982, 1983); 5× FIBA European Selection (1975, 1976, 1977, 1981, 1982); 4× FIBA Saporta Cup champion (1977, 1978, 1979, 1981); 4× FIBA Korać Cup champion (1973, 1974, 1975, 1991); 2× Italian League champion (1975, 1981); Mr. Europa (1976); Italian Basketball Hall of Fame (2007); EuroLeague 50 Greatest Contributors (2008)	
Dino Meneghin	Italy	C	List of achievements: Olympic Games silver medalist (1980); 4× FIBA Intercontinental Cup champion (1967, 1970, 1973, 1987); 7× EuroLeague champion (1970, 1972, 1973, 1975, 1976, 1987, 1988); EuroLeague Finals Top Scorer (1974); 3× FIBA European Selection (1975, 1978, 1980); 2× Mister Europa (1980, 1983); Euroscar (1983); 2× FIBA Saporta Cup champion (1967, 1980); FIBA Korać Cup champion (1985); 12× Italian League champion (1969–1971, 1973, 1974, 1977, 1978, 1982, 1985–1987, 1989); 6× Italian Cup winner (1969–1971, 1973, 1986, 1987); Italian Basketball Hall of Fame (2006); 50 Greatest EuroLeague Contributors (2008)	
Massimo Masini	Italy	C	List of achievements: EuroLeague champion (1966); 2× FIBA Saporta Cup champion (1971, 1972); FIBA Saporta Cup Finals Top Scorer (1971); 4× FIBA European Selection (1967, 1968, 1970, 1973); 4× Italian League champion (1965–1967, 1972); Italian Cup winner (1972); Italian Basketball Hall of Fame (2010)	
Bob Morse	United States	SF/PF	List of achievements: FIBA Intercontinental Cup champion (1973); 3× EuroLeague champion (1973, 1975, 1976); 2× EuroLeague Finals Top Scorer (1975, 1976); FIBA Saporta Cup champion (1980); 4× Italian League champion (1973, 1974, 1977, 1978); Italian Cup winner (1973); 6× Italian League Top Scorer (1973–1975, 1979–1981); 50 Greatest EuroLeague Contributors (2008); Second-team All-American – NABC (1972); First-team All-Ivy League (1972)	
Ivan Mrázek	Czechoslovakia; Czech Republic	PG	List of achievements: EuroBasket gold medalist (1946); 6× Czechoslovak League champion (1947, 1948 2×, 1949, 1950, 1951); FIBA EuroBasket Top Scorer (1951); FIBA EuroBasket MVP (1951); Czechoslovak 20th Century Team (2001)	
Anatoly Myshkin	Soviet Union; Russia	C/PF	List of achievements: 2× Olympic Games bronze medalist (1976, 1980); FIBA World Cup gold medalist (1982); 2× FIBA European Selection (1979, 1982); 8× USSR League champion (1977–1984); USSR Cup winner (1982)	
François Németh	Hungary	C	List of achievements: FIBA EuroBasket MVP (1946); 4× French League champion (1948–1951); 2× French League Best Scorer (1950, 1951)	
Modestas Paulauskas	Soviet Union; Lithuania	SF	List of achievements: Olympic Games gold medal (1972); Olympic Games silver medal (1968); 3x FIBA European Selection (1969, 1971, 1972); 4× EuroBasket champion (1965, 1967, 1969, 1971); 2x FIBA World Cup champion (1967, 1974); FIBA World Cup medalist (1970); EuroBasket medalist (1973)	
Amaury Pasos	Brazil	PF	List of achievements: 2x Olympic Games bronze medalist (1960, 1964); Brazil Former Athlete Olympic Prize (2003); FIBA World Cup MVP (1959); 2× South American Club Champion (1961, 1969); 2× Brazilian Champion (1966, 1969); 5× Paulista State Champion (1959, 1962, 1966, 1968, 1969)	
Dražen Petrović	Yugoslavia; Croatia	SG/PG	List of achievements: 2× Olympic Games silver medalist (1988, 1992); Olympic Games bronze medalist (1984); All-NBA Third Team (1993); 2× EuroLeague champion (1985, 1986); EuroLeague Finals Top Scorer (1985); FIBA European Selection (1987); 4× Euroscar (1986, 1989, 1992, 1993); 2× Mr. Europa Award (1986, 1993); 2× FIBA Saporta Cup champion (1987, 1989); 2× FIBA Saporta Cup Finals Top Scorer (1987, 1989); FIBA Korać Cup Finals Top Scorer (1988); Spanish League Top Scorer (1989); Spanish Cup winner (1989); Spanish Cup Final Top Scorer (1989); Yugoslav League champion (1985); 3× Yugoslav Cup winner (1985, 1986, 1988); FIBA World Championship MVP (1986); FIBA EuroBasket MVP (1989); Best Athlete of Yugoslavia (1985); Yugoslav Sportsman of the Year (1985); Croatian Sportsman of the Year (1985, 1986); Olympic Order (1993); 50 Greatest EuroLeague Contributors (2008)	
Dino Rađa	Yugoslavia; Croatia	PF	List of achievements: Olympic Games silver medalist (1988); NBA All-Rookie Second Team (1994); 2× EuroLeague champion (1989, 1990); EuroLeague Final Four MVP (1989); 2× FIBA European Selection (1991 2×); 3× FIBA EuroStar (1997–1999); 50 Greatest EuroLeague Contributors (2008); FIBA Korać Cup champion (1992); LBA All-Star Game MVP (1991); 2× LBA All-Star (1991, 1992); 2× Greek League champion (1998, 1999); Greek League Finals MVP (1998); Greek League Hall of Fame (2022); 3× Yugoslav League champion (1988–1990); Yugoslav Cup winner (1990); 2× Croatian League champion (2002, 2003); 2× Croatian Cup winner (2000, 2002); Croatian Cup MVP (2000)	
Antonello Riva	Italy	SG/SF	List of achievements: FIBA Intercontinental Cup champion (1982); 2× EuroLeague champion (1982, 1983); 3× FIBA European Selection (1987, 1991 2×); 3× FIBA Saporta Cup champion (1978, 1979, 1981); FIBA Korać Cup champion (1993); Italian League champion (1981); Italian League all-time leading scorer; FIBA All-Time EuroStars Team (2007); 50 Greatest EuroLeague Contributors (2008)	
Emiliano Rodríguez	Spain	SF	List of achievements: 4× EuroLeague champion (1964, 1965, 1967, 1968); 12× Spanish League champion (1961–1966, 1968–1973); 9× Spanish Cup winner (1961, 1962, 1965–1967, 1970–1973); FIBA Order of Merit (1997); 50 Greatest EuroLeague Contributors (2008); EuroBasket MVP (1963); 2× EuroLeague Finals Top Scorer (1963, 1964); 3× FIBA European Selection (1966, 1969, 1973); 2× Spanish League Top Scorer (1963, 1964)	
Arvydas Sabonis	Soviet Union; Lithuania	C	List of achievements: Olympic Games gold medal (1988); 2× Olympic Games bronze medal (1992, 1996); FIBA Club World Cup champion (1986); FIBA European League champion (1995); 3× USSR League champion (1985–1987); 2× ACB League champion (1993, 1994); LKL champion (2004); Spanish Cup winner (1993); 50 Greatest EuroLeague Contributors (2008); 6× Euroscar Player of the Year (1984, 1985, 1988, 1995, 1997, 1999); 2× Mr. Europa Player of the Year (1985, 1997); 4× Lithuanian Sportsman of the Year (1984–1986, 1996); EuroBasket MVP (1985); 2× FIBA European League Player of the Year (1993, 1995); FIBA European League Final Four MVP (1995); EuroLeague Group stage MVP (2004); EuroLeague Top 16 Stage MVP (2004); All-EuroLeague First Team (2004); 2× Spanish League Finals MVP (1993, 1994); 2× Spanish League MVP (1994, 1995); 2× Spanish All-Star Game MVP (1991, 1992); 2× EuroLeague Finals Top Scorer (1986, 1995); NBA All-Rookie First Team (1996)	
Juan Antonio "Epi" San Epifanio	Spain	SF	List of achievements: Olympic Games silver medal (1984); FIBA Intercontinental Cup champion (1985); FIBA Intercontinental Cup MVP (1987); Mr. Europa (1984); EuroLeague Finals Top Scorer (1984); 3× FIBA European Selection (1980, 1982, 1991); 2× FIBA Saporta Cup champion (1985, 1986); FIBA Saporta Cup Finals Top Scorer (1981); FIBA Korać Cup champion (1987); 7× Spanish League champion (1981, 1983 LEB, 1987–1990, 1994 ACB); 10× Spanish Cup winner (1978–1983, 1987, 1988, 1991, 1994); 3× Spanish Cup Finals Top Scorer (1981, 1983, 1984); 50 Greatest EuroLeague Contributors (2008)	
Oscar Schmidt	Brazil	SG/SF	List of achievements: FIBA Intercontinental Cup champion (1979); FIBA Intercontinental Cup Finals Top Scorer (1979); FIBA European Selection (1991); Spanish League Top Scorer (1994); 2× Spanish League All-Star (1993, 1994); Spanish League All-Star Game 3 Point Contest Champion (1993); Italian Basketball Hall of Fame (2017); 7× Italian League Top Scorer (1984–1987, 1989, 1990, 1992); Italian Cup winner (1988); 10× Italian League All-Star (1983–1992); Italian League All-Star Game MVP (1987); 3× Italian League All-Star Game 3 Point Contest Champion (1987–1989); 2× Italian 2nd Division Top Scorer (1991, 1993); South American Club Championship champion (1979); 3× Brazilian Championship champion (1977, 1979, 1996); 10× Brazilian Championship Top Scorer (1979, 1980, 1996–2003); Olympic Order (1997)	
Petar Skansi	Yugoslavia; Croatia	C	List of achievements: Olympic Games silver medalist (1968; FIBA World Cup champion (1970; FIBA European Selection (1971); EuroLeague Finals Top Scorer (1972); Yugoslav League champion (1971); 2× Yugoslav Cup winner (1972, 1974); Croatian Athlete of the Year (1970)	
Zoran Slavnić	Yugoslavia; Serbia	PG	List of achievements: Olympic Games gold medal (1980); FIBA World Cup champion (1978); 3× EuroBasket gold medalist (1973, 1975, 1977); FIBA Saporta Cup champion (1974); FIBA European Selection (1976); Spanish League champion (1978); 2× Yugoslavian League champion (1969, 1972); 3× Yugoslavian Cup winner (1971, 1973, 1975)	
Willy Steveniers	Belgium	SG	List of achievements: FIBA European Selection (1966); 5× Belgian League champion (1965–1967, 1970, 1980); 3× Belgian Cup winner (1964, 1965, 1969); 4× Belgian Player of the Year (1965–1967, 1970); Best Belgian Basketball Player of the 20th Century; Belgian League Lifetime Achievement Award (2019)	
Sasha Volkov	Soviet Union; Ukraine	PF/C	List of achievements: Olympic Games gold medal (1988); FIBA World Cup medalist (1986, 1990)	
Viktor Zubkov	Soviet Union; Russia	PF/C	List of achievements: 2× Olympic Games silver medal (1956, 1960); 2× EuroLeague champion (1961, 1963); EuroLeague Finals Top Scorer (1961); FIBA EuroBasket MVP (1959)	

== By nationality ==
- Player nationalities were selected by the national team eligibility of each player. Total is more than 50 because players of the former Yugoslavia, Czechoslovakia and the USSR are listed for multiple federations.

Country	Player (current independent country)
Yugoslavia	12
Soviet Union	10
Spain	7
Croatia	5
Serbia	5
Brazil	4
Italy	4
Lithuania	4
Russia	4
Czechoslovakia	2
France	2
Greece	2
Australia	1
Belgium	1
Bosnia and Herzegovina	1
Bulgaria	1
Czech Republic	1
Georgia	1
Hungary	1
Israel	1
Peru	1
Puerto Rico	1
Slovakia	1
Slovenia	1
United States	1
Ukraine	1

== FIBA's 50 Greatest All-Time Players (1991) Top 10 Vote Results ==
This is a list of the Top10 players (Bob Morse finished 17th) as published on the FIBA Basket magazine in 1991. (Note: Bob Morse was ranked 17th.)

Rank	Player	Country	Vote Total
1.	Sergei Belov	Soviet Union	311
2.	Dražen Petrović	Yugoslavia	280
3.	Arvydas Sabonis	Lithuania	277
4.	Krešimir Ćosić	Yugoslavia	273
5.	Toni Kukoč	Yugoslavia	264
6.	Nikos Galis	Greece	251
7.	Radivoj Korać	Yugoslavia	246
8.	Dino Meneghin	Italy	221
9.	Dražen Dalipagić	Yugoslavia	209
10.	Oscar Schmidt	Brazil	205

== Other FIBA Basket awards ==
=== FIBA European League Player of the Year ===
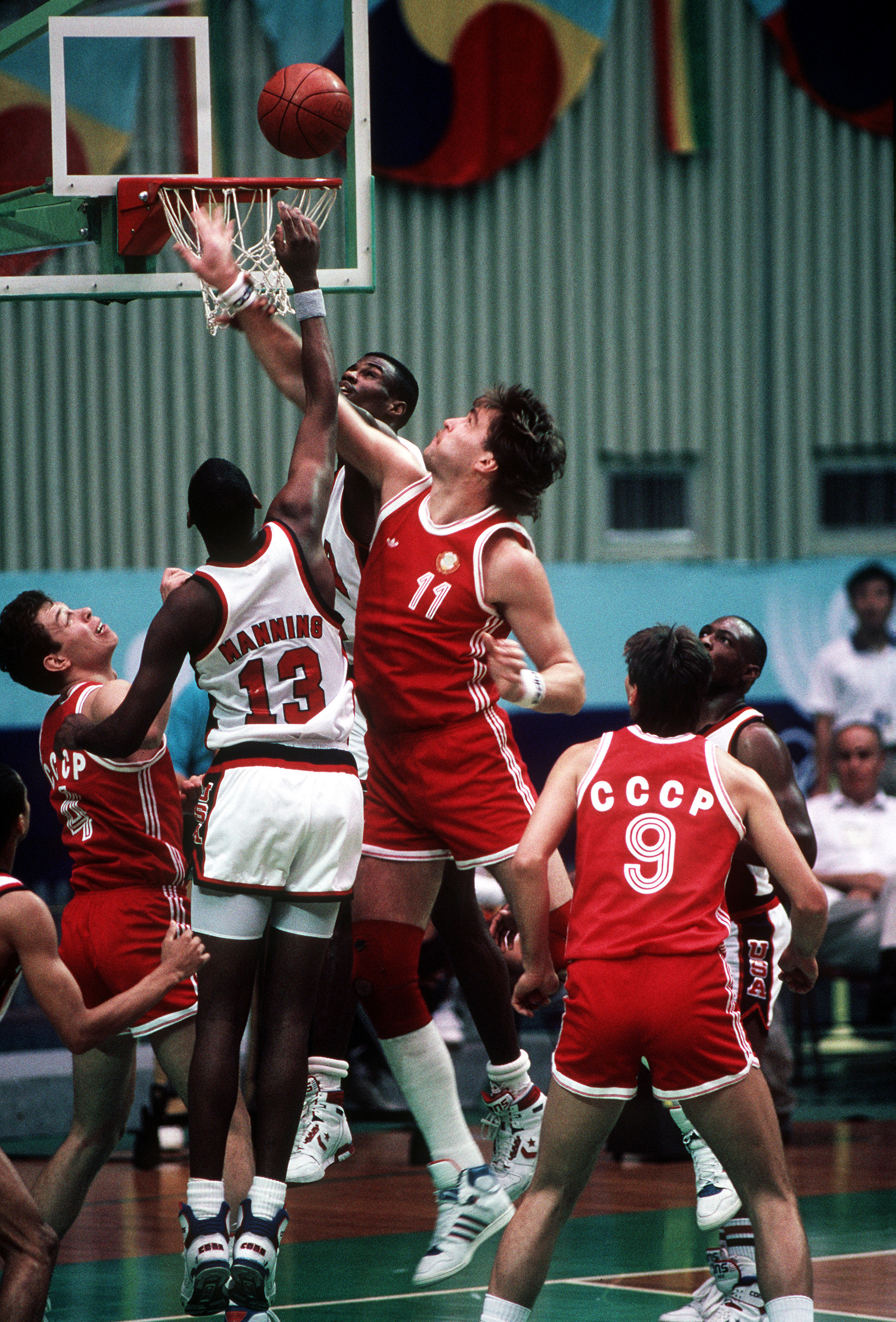
Arvydas Sabonis (#11 in red), was a 2× FIBA European League ("EuroLeague") Player of the Year, in 1993 and 1995.

FIBA Europe's select expert committee voted every year for the FIBA European League ("EuroLeague") Player of the Year award, or FIBA European League ("EuroLeague") POY. The award was for Europe's best player during the professional club season of the European top-tier level EuroLeague. At that time, the EuroLeague was still organized by FIBA, and it was officially known as the FIBA European League, or its shortened name, the "FIBA EuroLeague". The winner of each year's award was announced in FIBA's official monthly magazine, FIBA Basket.

Bronze	Member of the FIBA Hall of Fame.
Silver	Member of the Naismith Memorial Basketball Hall of Fame.
Gold	Member of both the FIBA Hall of Fame and the Naismith Memorial Basketball Hall of Fame.
Player (X)	Denotes the number of times the player has been named MVP.

Year	Position	Player of the Year	Team
1993	C	(Lithuania) Arvydas Sabonis	(Spain) Real Madrid
1994	SG	(Federal Republic of Yugoslavia) Predrag Danilović	(Italy) Virtus Bologna
1995	C	(Lithuania) Arvydas Sabonis	(Spain) Real Madrid
1996	SF	(Lithuania) Artūras Karnišovas	(Spain) Barcelona CF

== See also ==
- 1991 FIBA Centennial Jubilee
- Olympic Order
- FIBA Order of Merit
- FIBA Hall of Fame
- 50 Greatest EuroLeague Contributors (2008)
- EuroLeague 2000–2010 All-Decade Team
- EuroLeague 2010–2020 All-Decade Team
- EuroLeague Legends
- EuroLeague 25th Anniversary Team

== Sources ==
- Bergum, Bob (2015). Basketball All Greats. pp. 67–68. ISBN 9788892508729.
- FIBA Basket monthly magazines 1991-1998
