= EuroBasket 1975 =

International basketball event

Европско првенство у кошарци 1975. Europsko prvenstvo u košarci 1975.

Tournament details
- Host country: Yugoslavia
- Dates: 7–15 June
- Teams: 12
- Venues: 4 (in 4 host cities)

Final positions
- Champions: Yugoslavia (2nd title)
- Runners-up: Soviet Union
- Third place: Italy
- Fourth place: Spain

Tournament statistics
- MVP: (Socialist Federal Republic of Yugoslavia) Krešimir Ćosić
- Top scorer: (Bulgaria) Atanas Golomeev (23.1 points per game)

The 1975 FIBA European Championship, commonly called FIBA EuroBasket 1975, was the nineteenth FIBA EuroBasket regional basketball championship, held by FIBA Europe.

== Venues ==
Belgrade	Split	Karlovac	Rijeka
Hala Pionir; Capacity 7 000	Mala dvorana Gripe	Sportska Dvorana Mladost; Capacity 4 000	Dvorana Dinko Lukarić; Capacity 2 000

== First round ==
=== Group A – Split ===
Italy	Turkey	83–65
Yugoslavia	Netherlands	102–76
Netherlands	Italy	64–69
Yugoslavia	Turkey	92–65
Turkey	Netherlands	71–64
Yugoslavia	Italy	83–69

Pos.	Team	Matches	Wins	Losses	Results	Points	Diff.
1.	Yugoslavia	3	3	0	277:210	6	+67
2.	Italy	3	2	1	221:212	4	+9
3.	Turkey	3	1	2	201:239	2	−38
4.	Netherlands	3	0	3	204:242	0	−38

=== Group B – Karlovac ===
Czechoslovakia	Israel	86–85
Soviet Union	Poland	79–72
Soviet Union	Czechoslovakia	91–81
Israel	Poland	90–84
Soviet Union	Israel	85–71
Czechoslovakia	Poland	94–76

Pos.	Team	Matches	Wins	Losses	Results	Points	Diff.
1.	Soviet Union	3	3	0	255:224	6	+31
2.	Czechoslovakia	3	2	1	261:252	4	+9
3.	Israel	3	1	2	246:255	2	−9
4.	Poland	3	0	3	232:263	0	−31

=== Group C – Rijeka ===
Greece	Romania	61–71
Spain	Bulgaria	85–74
Bulgaria	Greece	81–71
Spain	Romania	96–66
Spain	Greece	89–63
Romania	Bulgaria	62–80

Pos.	Team	Matches	Wins	Losses	Results	Points	Diff.
1.	Spain	3	3	0	270:203	6	+67
2.	Bulgaria	3	2	1	235:218	4	+17
3.	Romania	3	1	2	199:237	2	−38
4.	Greece	3	0	3	195:241	0	−46

== Second round ==
=== Places 7 – 12 ===
Netherlands	Israel	80–81
Turkey	Romania	86–77
Greece	Poland	79–74
Turkey	Israel	77–101
Netherlands	Greece	66–65
Romania	Poland	81–82
Romania	Netherlands	74–80
Israel	Greece	87–76
Turkey	Poland	71–90
Turkey	Greece	74–64
Poland	Netherlands	86–66
Israel	Romania	119–105

Pos.	Team	Matches	Wins	Losses	Results	Points	Diff.
7.	Israel	5	5	0	388:338	10	+50
8.	Poland	5	4	1	332:297	6	+35
9.	Turkey	5	3	2	308:332	6	−24
10.	Netherlands	5	2	3	292:306	4	−14
11.	Romania	5	1	4	337:367	2	−30
12.	Greece	5	1	4	284:301	2	−17

=== Places 1 – 6 in Belgrade ===
Czechoslovakia	Bulgaria	70–86
Yugoslavia	Spain	98–76
Soviet Union	Italy	69–65
Yugoslavia	Czechoslovakia	84–68
Soviet Union	Bulgaria	94–79
Italy	Spain	89–69
Italy	Czechoslovakia	68–72
Soviet Union	Spain	94–80
Bulgaria	Yugoslavia	76–105
Spain	Czechoslovakia	87–67
Bulgaria	Italy	71–90
Yugoslavia	Soviet Union	90–84

Pos.	Team	Matches	Wins	Losses	Results	Points	Diff.
1.	Yugoslavia	5	5	0	377:304	10	+73
2.	Soviet Union	5	4	1	341:314	8	+27
3.	Italy	5	2	3	312:281	4	+31
4.	Spain	5	2	3	312:348	4	−36
5.	Bulgaria	5	1	4	312:359	2	−47
6.	Czechoslovakia	5	1	4	277:325	2	−48

1975 FIBA EuroBasket champions

Yugoslavia
2nd title

== Final standings ==
1. Yugoslavia
2. Soviet Union
3. Italy
4. Spain
5. Bulgaria
6. Czechoslovakia
7. Israel
8. Poland
9. Turkey
10. Netherlands
11. Romania
12. Greece

== Awards ==
1975 FIBA EuroBasket MVP: Krešimir Ćosić ( (Socialist Federal Republic of Yugoslavia) Yugoslavia)

All-Tournament Team
(Soviet Union) Sergei Belov
(Socialist Federal Republic of Yugoslavia) Dražen Dalipagić
(Spain) Wayne Brabender
(Socialist Federal Republic of Yugoslavia) Krešimir Ćosić (MVP)
(Bulgaria) Atanas Golomeev

== Team rosters ==
1. Yugoslavia: Krešimir Ćosić, Dražen Dalipagić, Mirza Delibašić, Dragan Kićanović, Zoran Slavnić, Nikola Plećaš, Željko Jerkov, Vinko Jelovac, Damir Šolman, Rato Tvrdić, Rajko Žižić, Dragan Kapičić (Coach: Mirko Novosel)

2. Soviet Union: Sergei Belov, Alexander Belov, Ivan Edeshko, Alzhan Zharmukhamedov, Mikheil Korkia, Aleksander Sidjakin, Valeri Miloserdov, Yuri Pavlov, Aleksander Boloshev, Aleksander Salnikov, Vladimir Zhigili, Aleksander Bolshakov (Coach: Vladimir Kondrashin)

3. Italy: Dino Meneghin, Pierluigi Marzorati, Carlo Recalcati, Renzo Bariviera, Renato Villalta, Ivan Bisson, Lorenzo Carraro, Fabrizio della Fiori, Marino Zanatta, Gianni Bertolotti, Giulio Iellini, Vittorio Ferracini (Coach: Giancarlo Primo)

4. Spain: Juan Antonio Corbalán, Wayne Brabender, Clifford Luyk, Rafael Rullan, Luis Miguel Santillana, Manuel Flores, Carmelo Cabrera, Cristóbal Rodríguez, Jesus Iradier, Miguel Angel Lopez Abril, Juan Filba, Miguel Angel Estrada (Coach: Antonio Díaz-Miguel)
