= Massimo Masini =

Italian basketball player and coach

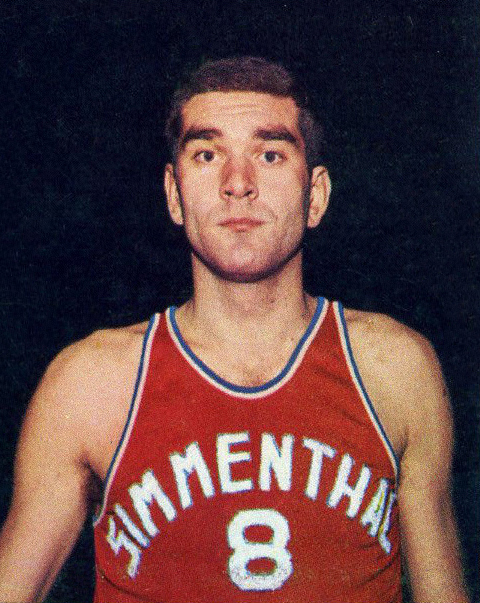
- Masini circa 1968

Personal information
- Born: 9 May 1945 (age 81) Montecatini Terme, Italy
- Listed height: 2.08 m (6 ft 10 in)
- Listed weight: 105 kg (231 lb)

Career information
- Playing career: 1963–1980
- Position: Center

Career history

Playing
- 1963–1974: Olimpia Milano
- 1974–1975: AMG Sebastiani Basket Rieti
- 1976–1977: Sporting Club Gira
- 1978–1980: Pallacanestro Pordenone

Coaching
- 1986–1990: Montecatini S.C.
- 1990–1991: Pallacanestro Aurora Desio
- 1998: Montecatini S.C.

Career highlights
- As a player: EuroLeague champion (1966); 2× FIBA Saporta Cup champion (1971, 1972); FIBA Saporta Cup Finals Top Scorer (1971); 4× FIBA European Selection (1967, 1968, 1970, 1973); 4× Italian League champion (1965–1967, 1972); Italian Cup winner (1972); 50 Greatest FIBA Players (1991); Italian Basketball Hall of Fame (2010)
Medals
Men's basketball
Representing Italy
EuroBasket
Bronze medal – third place	1971 Germany

Massimo Masini (born 9 May 1945) is a former Italian professional basketball player and coach. At a height of 6 feet 10 inches (2.08 m) tall, he played at the center position. He was named one of FIBA's 50 Greatest Players 1991.

== Club career ==
Masini spent the major part of his club career playing with Olimpia Milano. With Olimpia Milano, he won a FIBA European Champions Cup (now called EuroLeague) title, in the 1965–66 season, and two FIBA Saporta Cup titles, in the 1970–71 season, and the 1971–72 season.

== National team career ==
Masini represented the senior men's Italian national basketball team (1963–1972) in international national team competitions. He played at the 1964 Summer Olympic Games, the 1968 Summer Olympic Games, and the 1972 Summer Olympic Games. He won a EuroBasket bronze medal at the 1971 EuroBasket, as he averaged 6 points per game in the tournament.
