= Luis Santillana =

Spanish basketball player (born 1951)

Personal information
- Born: August 13, 1951 (age 75) Barcelona, Spain
- Listed height: 6 ft 9.5 in (2.07 m)
- Listed weight: 243 lb (110 kg)

Career information
- Playing career: 1967–1986
- Position: Center
- Number: 4

Career history
- 1967–1981: Joventut Badalona
- 1982–1984: FC Barcelona
- 1985–1986: CB Cartagena

Career highlights
- As a player: 4× FIBA European Selection Team (1974, 1975, 1976, 1978); FIBA Korać Cup champion (1981); 2× Spanish League champion (1978, 1983); 3× Spanish Cup winner (1969, 1976, 1983); 2× Catalan League champion (1982, 1983); Spanish Royal Order of Sports Merit (2003)
Medals
Men's basketball
Representing Spain
FIBA Pre-Olympic Tournament
Silver medal – second place	1972 West Germany
FIBA European Olympic Qualifying Tournament
Bronze medal – third place	1972 Netherlands
Bronze medal – third place	1980 Switzerland
FIBA EuroBasket
Silver medal – second place	1973 Spain

Luis Miguel Santillana Fraile (born 13 August 1951) is a Spanish former basketball player. He was awarded with the *Spanish Royal Order of Sports Merit in 2003.

== Club career ==
During his club career, Santillana won the championship of the European-wide third tier level competition, the FIBA Korać Cup, in the 1980-81 season. He also won two Spanish First Division championships, in the (1977-78 season, and the 1982-83 season, and three Spanish King's Cup titles, in 1969, 1976, and 1983. He was also a two-time Catalan League champion, in 1982, and 1983.

On an individual level, Santillana was a four-time member of the FIBA European Selection Team, in the years 1974, 1975, 1976, and 1978.

== National team career ==
Santillana was a member of the senior men's Spanish national basketball team. With Spain, he had a total of 159 caps. Santillana competed at the following major FIBA tournaments: the 1971 FIBA EuroBasket, the 1972 FIBA European Olympic Qualifying Tournament, the 1972 FIBA Pre-Olympic Tournament, the 1972 Summer Olympic Games, the 1973 FIBA EuroBasket, the 1974 FIBA World Championship, the 1975 FIBA EuroBasket, the 1976 FIBA Pre-Olympic Tournament, the 1977 FIBA EuroBasket, the 1979 EuroBasket, the 1980 FIBA European Olympic Qualifying Tournament, and the 1980 Summer Olympic Games.

While representing Spain, Santillana won the silver medal at the 1973 edition of the FIBA EuroBasket.
