= Renzo Bariviera =

Italian basketball player (born 1949)

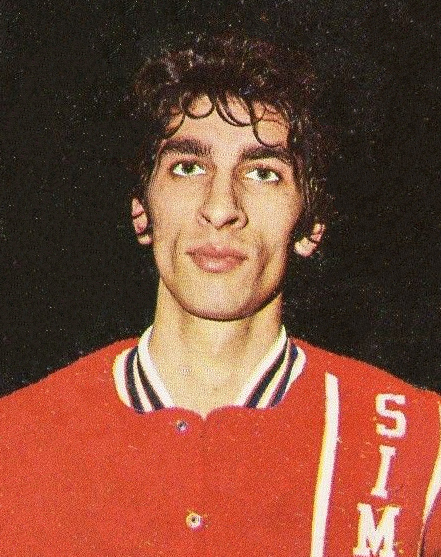
- Bariviera in 1973.

Personal information
- Born: 16 February 1949 (age 77) Conegliano, Italy
- Listed height: 2.02 m (6 ft 8 in)
- Listed weight: 93 kg (205 lb)

Career information
- Playing career: 1967–1987
- Position: Small forward

Career history
- 1967–1969: Petrarca
- 1969–1975: Olimpia Milano
- 1975–1976: Libertas Forlì
- 1976–1978: SC Gira
- 1978–1983: Cantù
- 1983–1986: Olimpia Milano
- 1986–1987: Aurora Desio

Career highlights
- FIBA Intercontinental Cup champion (1982); 2× EuroLeague champion (1982, 1983); 4× FIBA European Selection (1975–1978); 4× FIBA Saporta Cup champion (1971, 1972, 1979, 1981); FIBA Korać Cup champion (1985); 4× Italian League champion (1972, 1981, 1985, 1986); Italian Cup winner (1986); Italian Basketball Hall of Fame (2012)
Medals
Men's basketball
Representing Italy
FIBA EuroBasket
Bronze medal – third place	1971 Germany
Bronze medal – third place	1975 Yugoslavia
European U-18 Championship
Bronze medal – third place	1968 Spain	Under-18

Renzo Bariviera (born 16 February 1949) is a retired Italian professional basketball player. In 2012, he was inducted into the Italian Basketball Hall of Fame. His elder brother, Vendramino, was an Olympic cyclist.

== Professional career ==
Bariviera won 2 EuroLeague championships, in 1982 and 1983.

== National team career ==
Bariviera was a part of the senior Italian national basketball team that won bronze medals at the 1971 EuroBasket, and the 1975 EuroBasket. He also competed at the 1972 Summer Olympic Games, and at the 1976 Summer Olympic Games, and finished in fourth and fifth place, respectively.
