= 50 Greatest EuroLeague Contributors (2008) =

The 50 Greatest EuroLeague Contributors (2008) of FIBA European Champions Cup and EuroLeague history were awarded and chosen on February 3, 2008, in Madrid, Spain. The occasion was the fiftieth anniversary since the founding of the inaugural season of the FIBA European Champions Cup, which is officially recognized as the predecessor of today's modern EuroLeague competition, which is the premier level men's basketball league in Europe.

The list was made up of 35 players, 10 coaches, and 5 referees that were deemed to have contributed the most to the growth of the EuroLeague. It also included other nominees for each category. All together, 105 players, 20 coaches, and 12 referees in total were nominated.

== Contributors ==
=== Players ===
The following is the list of 35 awarded players.

Country	Player	Years (Note: Indicate years played as a senior men's club basketball player in all leagues, not just the EuroLeague.)
Serbia (6)	Radivoj Korać	1954–1969
Serbia (6)	Dražen Dalipagić	1971–1991
Serbia (6)	Vlade Divac	1983–2005
Serbia (6)	Aleksandar "Saša" Đorđević	1983–2005
Serbia (6)	Predrag Danilović	1988–2000
Serbia (6)	Dejan Bodiroga	1989–2007
Spain (5)	Emiliano Rodríguez	1958–1973
Spain (5)	Clifford Luyk	1962–1978
Spain (5)	Wayne Brabender	1967–1985
Spain (5)	Juan Antonio Corbalán	1971–1991
Spain (5)	Juan Antonio San Epifanio "Epi"	1977–1995
Italy (5)	Aldo Ossola	1962–1980
Italy (5)	Dino Meneghin	1966–1994
Italy (5)	Pierluigi Marzorati	1969–1991, 2006
Italy (5)	Mike D'Antoni	1973–1990
Italy (5)	Antonello Riva	1977–2002, 2014
Croatia (4)	Krešimir Ćosić	1964–1983
Croatia (4)	Dražen Petrović	1979–1993
Croatia (4)	Dino Rađa	1985–2003
Croatia (4)	Toni Kukoč	1985–2006
Greece (4)	Panagiotis Giannakis	1972–1996
Greece (4)	Nikos Galis	1979–1994
Greece (4)	Fragiskos Alvertis	1990–2009
Greece (4)	Theo Papaloukas	1995–2013
United States (4)	Walter Szczerbiak Sr.	1971–1984
United States (4)	Bob Morse	1972–1986
United States (4)	Bob McAdoo	1972–1992
United States (4)	Anthony Parker	1997–2012
Lithuania (2)	Arvydas Sabonis	1981–2004
Lithuania (2)	Šarūnas Jasikevičius	1998–2014
Russia	Sergei Belov	1964–1980
Bosnia and Herzegovina	Mirza Delibašić	1968–1983
Israel	Miki Berkovich	1971–1995
Mexico	Manuel Raga	1963–1979
Argentina	Manu Ginóbili	1995–2018

=== Coaches ===
The following is the list of 10 awarded coaches.

Country	Coach	Years (Note: Indicate years spent as a basketball coach, in all competitions, not just the EuroLeague.)
Serbia (4)	Aleksandar Nikolić	1951–1985
Serbia (4)	Dušan Ivković	1968–2016
Serbia (4)	Božidar Maljković	1971–2013
Serbia (4)	Željko Obradović	1991–present
Spain (2)	Pedro Ferrándiz	1955–1975
Spain (2)	Manuel "Lolo" Sáinz	1969–2001
Russia	Alexander Gomelsky	1949–1991
United States	Dan Peterson	1962–1988, 2011
Israel	Pini Gershon	1974–2015
Italy	Ettore Messina	1976–present

=== Referees ===
The following is the list of 5 awarded referees.

Country	Referee
Bulgaria	Artenik Arabadjian
France	Yvan Mainini
Greece	Costas Rigas
Russia	Mikhail Davidov
Slovakia	Lubomir Kotleba

== Other nominees that were not selected ==
=== 70 Player nominees ===
- Years in parentheses indicate years played as a senior men's club basketball player in all leagues, not just the EuroLeague.

Country	Player	Years Played (in all club leagues)
United States	Miles Aiken	(1965–1970)
United States	Bill Bradley	(1965–1977)
United States	Charlie Yelverton	(1971–1987)
United States	Aulcie Perry	(1974–1985)
United States	Larry Wright	(1976–1988)
United States	Bruce Flowers	(1979–1987)
United States	Clarence Kea	(1980–1994)
United States	Kevin Magee	(1982–1994)
United States	Audie Norris	(1982–1994)
United States	Corny Thompson	(1982–1996)
United States	Dominique Wilkins	(1982–1999)
United States	Michael Young	(1984–1996)
United States	Joe Arlauckas	(1987–2000)
United States	David Rivers	(1988–2001)
United States	Tyus Edney	(1995–2010)
United States	Marcus Brown	(1996–2011)
Serbia	Zoran "Moka" Slavnić	(1963–1983)
Serbia	Žarko Varajić	(1969–1984)
Serbia	Dragan Kićanović	(1971–1984)
Serbia	Žarko Paspalj	(1984–1998)
Serbia	Zoran Savić	(1989–2002)
Serbia	Željko Rebrača	(1990–2007)
Croatia	Josip Đerđa	(1958–1976)
Croatia	Mihovil Nakić-Vojnović	(1973–1989)
Croatia	Aleksandar "Aco" Petrović	(1977–1991)
Croatia	Stojan "Stojko" Vranković	(1982–2001)
Croatia	Velimir Perasović	(1985–2003)
Croatia	Nikola Vujčić	(1995—2013)
Spain	Rafael Rullán	(1969–1988)
Spain	Ignacio "Nacho" Solozábal	(1975–1992)
Spain	Fernando Martín	(1979–1989)
Spain	Jordi Villacampa	(1980–1997)
Spain	Johnny Rogers	(1986–2004)
Spain	Juan Carlos Navarro	(1997–2018)
Italy	Carlo Recalcati	(1962–1981)
Italy	Roberto Brunamonti	(1975–1996)
Italy	Walter Magnifico	(1979–2004)
Italy	Riccardo Pittis	(1984–2004)
Russia	Yuri Korneev	(1954–1966)
Russia	Gennadi Volnov	(1957–1972)
Russia	Vladimir Andreev	(1963–1975)
Russia	Anatoly Myshkin	(1970–1986)
Russia	Vladimir Tkachenko	(1973–1990)
Lithuania	Valdemaras Chomičius	(1978–2000)
Lithuania	Rimas Kurtinaitis	(1982–2006)
Lithuania	Artūras Karnišovas	(1989–2002)
Lithuania	Saulius Štombergas	(1991–2007)
Israel	Tal Brody	(1966–1980)
Israel	Motti Aroesti	(1971–1991)
Israel	Doron Jamchi	(1978–2000)
Israel	Derrick Sharp	(1993–2011)
France	Richard Dacoury	(1976–1998)
France	Stéphane Ostrowski	(1979–2005)
France	Antoine Rigaudeau	(1987–2005)
Slovenia	Ivo Daneu	(1956–1970)
Slovenia	Jurij "Jure" Zdovc	(1987–2003)
Slovenia	Matjaž Smodiš	(1994–2013)
Latvia	Maigonis Valdmanis	(1949–1963)
Latvia	Valdis Muižnieks	(1951–1969)
Latvia	Jānis Krūmiņš	(1954–1969)
Greece	Panagiotis Fasoulas	(1981–1999)
Greece	Dimitris Diamantidis	(1999–2016)
Ukraine	Alexander Volkov	(1983–1996)
Turkey	İbrahim Kutluay	(1991–2009)
Turkey	Mirsad Türkcan	(1994–2012)
Armenia	Armenak Alachachian	(1952–1968)
Czech Republic	Jiří Zídek Sr.	(1962–1983)
Montenegro	Duško Ivanović	(1980–1996)
North Macedonia	Petar Naumoski	(1989–2004)
Argentina	Luis Scola	(1996–2021)

=== 10 Coach nominees ===
- Years in parentheses indicate years spent as a basketball coach, in all competitions, not just the EuroLeague.

Country	Coach	Years Coached (in all competitions)
Italy	Cesare Rubini	(1957–1973)
Italy	Alessandro "Sandro" Gamba	(1965–1992)
Italy	Valerio Bianchini	(1974–2008)
Serbia	Ranko Žeravica	(1954–2003)
Serbia	Svetislav Pešić	(1982–Present)
Croatia	Mirko Novosel	(1967–1993)
Croatia	Željko Pavličević	(1975–2023)
Israel	Ralph Klein	(1964–2008)
Spain	Alejandro "Aíto" García Reneses	(1973–2023)
Greece	Giannis Ioannidis	(1977–2003)

=== 7 Referee nominees ===
Country	Referee
Finland	Carl Jungebrand
Hungary	Ervin Kassai
Lithuania	Romualdas Brazauskas
Poland	Wiesław Zych
Serbia	Obrad Belošević
Spain	Pedro Hernández-Cabrera
United Kingdom	David Turner

== See also ==
- EuroLeague 2000–2010 All-Decade Team
- EuroLeague 2010–2020 All-Decade Team
- EuroLeague Legends
- Olympic Order
- FIBA's 50 Greatest Players (1991)
- FIBA Order of Merit
- FIBA Hall of Fame
