= Ivan Bisson =

Italian basketball player (born 1946)

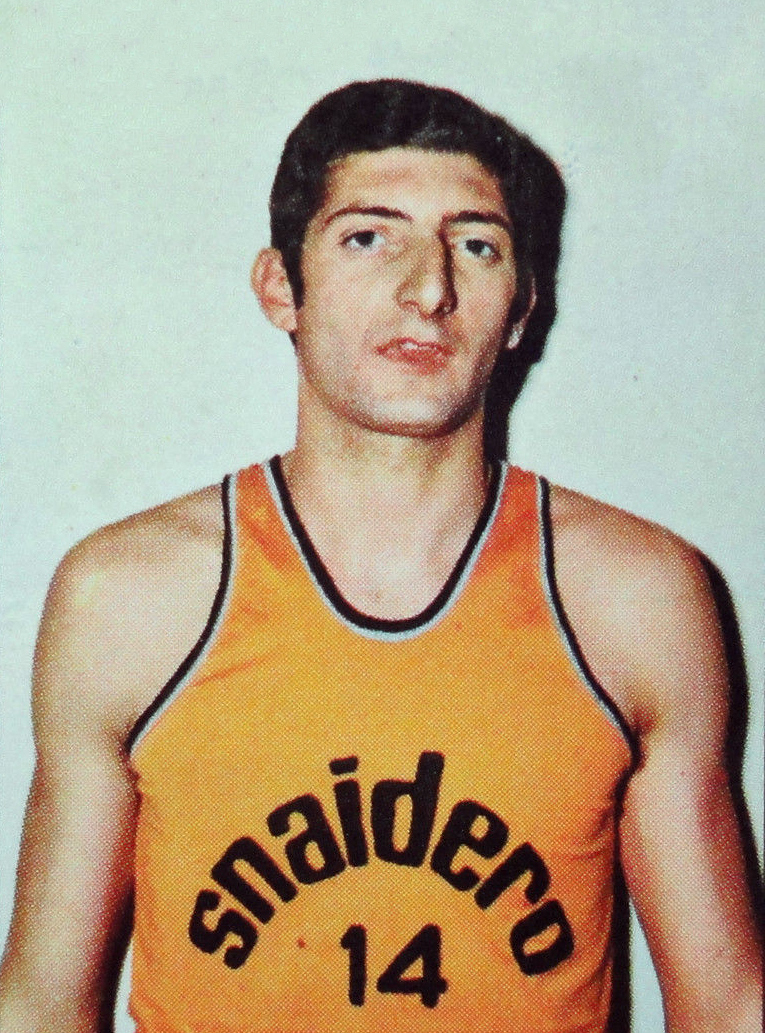
- Bisson, in 1968.

Personal information
- Born: 21 April 1946 (age 80) Macerata, Italy
- Listed height: 6 ft 6.75 in (2.00 m)
- Listed weight: 208 lb (94 kg)

Career information
- Playing career: 1968–1978
- Position: Power forward

Career history
- 1968–1970: Snaidero Udine
- 1970–1978: Varese

Career highlights
- 2× FIBA Intercontinental Cup champion (1970, 1973); 4× EuroLeague champion (1972, 1973, 1975, 1976); 2× FIBA European Selection (1975, 1976); 5× Italian League champion (1971, 1973, 1974, 1977, 1978); 2× Italian Cup winner (1971, 1973); Italian Basketball Hall of Fame (2015)
Medals
Men's basketball
Representing Italy
FIBA EuroBasket
| Bronze medal – third place | 1971 Germany |
| Bronze medal – third place | 1975 Yugoslavia |

Ivan Bisson (born 21 April 1946) is a retired Italian professional basketball player.

== Professional career ==
Bisson was a member of the FIBA European Selection, in 1975. He was a four time EuroLeague champion (1972, 1973, 1975, 1976).

== National team career ==
Bisson was a part of the senior Italian national basketball teams that won bronze medals at the 1971 EuroBasket, and the 1975 EuroBasket. He also competed at the 1972 Summer Olympics, and the 1976 Summer Olympics, finishing in fourth and fifth place, respectively.
