= Pierluigi Marzorati =

Italian basketball player

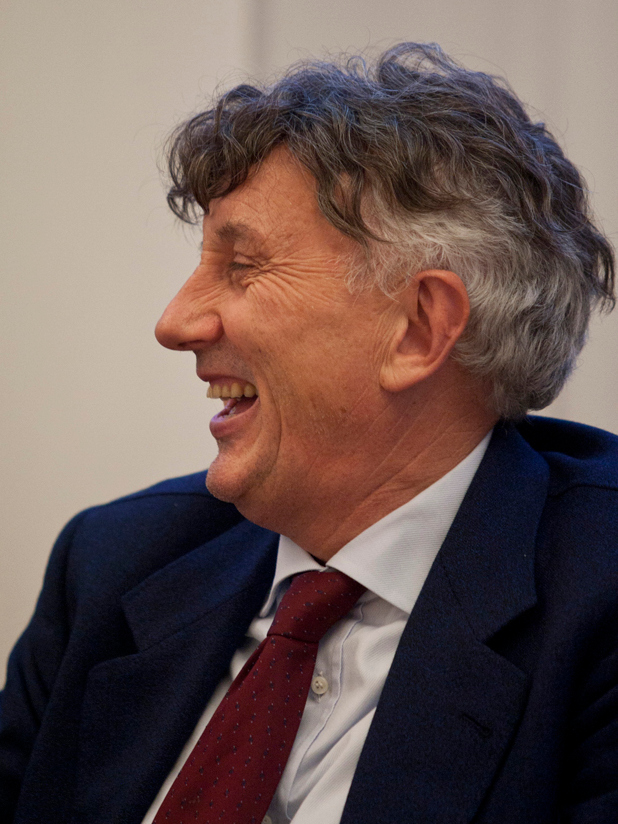
- Marzorati in 2010

Personal information
- Born: 12 September 1952 (age 74) Figino Serenza, Italy
- Listed height: 6 ft 1.75 in (1.87 m)
- Listed weight: 200 lb (91 kg)

Career information
- Playing career: 1969–1991, 2006
- Position: Point guard

Career history
- 1969–1991, 2006: Cantù

Career highlights
- 2× FIBA Intercontinental Cup champion (1975, 1982); 2× EuroLeague champion (1982, 1983); 5× FIBA European Selection (1975–1977, 1981, 1982); 4× FIBA Saporta Cup champion (1977–1979, 1981); 4× FIBA Korać Cup champion (1973–1975, 1991); 2× Italian League champion (1975, 1981); Mr. Europa (1976); FIBA's 50 Greatest Players (1991); No. 14 retired by Cantù (1991); Italian Basketball Hall of Fame (2007); EuroLeague 50 Greatest Contributors (2008); Walk of Fame of Italian sport (2015)
- FIBA Hall of Fame
Medals
Men's Basketball
Representing Italy (partial support)
Summer Olympic Games
Silver medal – second place	1980 Moscow
Representing Italy
FIBA EuroBasket
Bronze medal – third place	1971 West Germany
Bronze medal – third place	1975 Yugoslavia
Gold medal – first place	1983 France
Bronze medal – third place	1985 West Germany
European U-18 Championship
Bronze medal – third place	1970 Greece	Under-18

Pierluigi "Pierlo" Marzorati (born 12 September 1952) is an Italian former professional basketball player. During his playing career, he was nicknamed "L'ingegnere volante" (EN: "The Flying Engineer"). He is considered to have been one of the best point guards of all time in Europe, and was named the Mister Europa, in 1976. He was named one of FIBA's 50 Greatest Players in 1991. In 2007, he was inducted into the Italian Basketball Hall of Fame and enshrined into the FIBA Hall of Fame. In 2008, he was chosen as one of the 50 Greatest EuroLeague Contributors. Marzorati was inducted into the Walk of Fame of Italian sport in May of 2015.

== Club playing career ==
Marzorati was one of the key players of the Cantù team (in which he played from 1969 to 1991), winning 2 Italian League championships (in 1975 and 1981), 2 FIBA European Champions' Cup (EuroLeague) titles (1982 and 1983), 4 FIBA Cup Winners' Cups (1977, 1978, 1979 and 1981), 4 FIBA Korać Cups (1973, 1974, 1975 and 1991) and 2 FIBA Intercontinental Cups (1975 and 1982). Marzorati's number 14 jersey was retired by Cantù on 12 September 1991.

In July 2006, Marzorati decided to come back at age 54, to top class competitions with Cantù, for the 70th anniversary of the team. On 6 October 2006, he finally appeared in an official game for Cantù, playing two minutes in an Italian League game, against the Italian national league champions Benetton Treviso. Cantù won the game by a score of 70–69. This way, he became the first (and only) basketball player in history to have played official games in five different decades, as well as the oldest professional basketball player to have ever taken part in an official game.

In 693 games played in the top-tier level Italian League, Marzorati scored a total of 8,659 points.

== National team career ==
Marzorati played in 278 games for the senior men's Italian national basketball team, in which he scored a total of 2,209 points. While representing Italy, he won the silver medal at the 1980 Summer Olympics in Moscow, and the gold medal at the 1983 FIBA EuroBasket. He also won three bronze medals at the 1971, 1975, and 1985 editions of the FIBA EuroBasket.

== Post-playing career ==
Marzorati played his whole career with Cantù. After his playing career ended in 1991, he became the Vice-President for the club, and he served in that capacity until 1996.
