= Giancarlo Primo =

Italian basketball player and coach (1924–2005)

Personal information
- Born: 4 November 1924 Rome, Italy
- Died: 27 December 2005 (aged 81) Civita Castellana, Italy

Career information
- Playing career: 1947–1957
- Position: Shooting guard
- Coaching career: 1956–1989

Career history

Playing
- 1947–1957: Società Ginnastica Roma

Coaching
- 1956–1957: Società Ginnastica Roma
- 1958–1968: Italy Women
- 1968–1979: Italy
- 1980–1982: Pielle Livorno
- 1982–1983: Pallacanestro Cantù
- 1983–1984: UG Goriziana
- 1984–1985: Libertas Livorno
- 1987–1989: Virtus Roma

Career highlights
- As head coach: FIBA Order of Merit (2001); FIBA Intercontinental Cup champion (1982); EuroLeague champion (1983); 3× FIBA European Selection (1974–1976); Italian Basketball Hall of Fame (2008); Gold Star for Sports Merit (Italy) (1998)
- FIBA Hall of Fame
Medals
Men's basketball
Head coach for Italy
FIBA EuroBasket
Bronze medal – third place	1971 West Germany
Bronze medal – third place	1975 Yugoslavia

Giancarlo Primo (4 November 1924 – 27 December 2005) was an Italian professional basketball player and coach. He was a coach of the FIBA European Selection team in 1974, 1975, and 1976. In 2001, he was awarded the FIBA Order of Merit. In 2007, he was enshrined into the FIBA Hall of Fame, and in 2008, he was inducted into the Italian Basketball Hall of Fame.

== Club playing career ==
During his club playing career, Primo played with Società Ginnastica Roma.

== National team playing career ==
As a player of the senior Italian national team, Primo participated at the EuroBasket 1947, the 1948 Summer Olympic Games, the EuroBasket 1949, and the 1951 Mediterranean Games, where he won a bronze medal.

== Coaching career ==
After retiring as a player, Primo became the head coach of the senior Italian women's national team, participating at the EuroBasket Women 1960, the EuroBasket Women 1962, the 1967 FIBA World Championship for Women, and the EuroBasket Women 1968.

From 1968 to 1979, he was the head coach of the senior Italian men's national team, winning bronze medals at the EuroBasket 1971, and the EuroBasket 1975. He coached Italy at the: 1972 Summer Olympic Games, the 1976 Summer Olympic Games, the 1970 FIBA World Championship, the 1978 FIBA World Championship, and 6 EuroBasket tournaments. In total, he coached Italy in 238 games. While he was coaching the senior Italian national team, Italy defeated, for the first time, both the United States, at the 1970 FIBA World Championship, and the Soviet Union, at the 1977 EuroBasket.

After 1979, he coached the club teams: Livorno (1980–1982), Cantù (1982–1983, winning the FIBA Intercontinental Cup and the FIBA European Champions Cup (EuroLeague)), SB Gorizia (1983–1984), O.T.C. Livorno (1984–1985), and Virtus Roma (1987–1989).

== See also ==
- List of EuroLeague-winning head coaches
