= Miki Berkovich =

Israeli basketball player

Miki Berkovich 'מיקי ברקוביץ
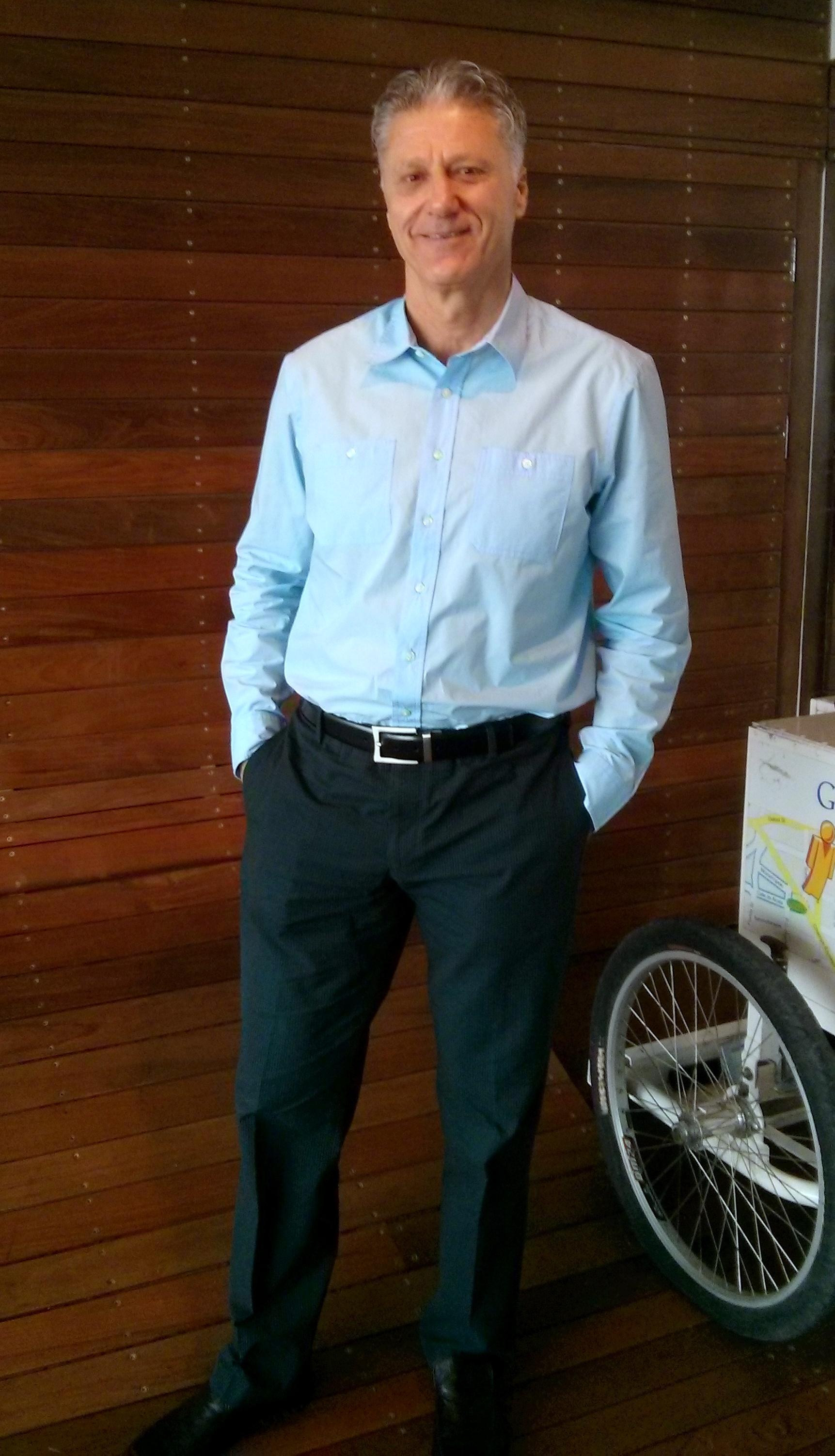
- Berkovich in 2013

Personal information
- Born: 17 February 1954 (age 72) Kfar Saba, Israel
- Listed height: 6 ft 4 in (1.93 m)
- Listed weight: 210 lb (95 kg)

Career information
- College: UNLV (1975–1976)
- NBA draft: 1976: undrafted
- Playing career: 1971–1995
- Position: Shooting guard
- Number: 9

Career history
- 1971–1975, 1976–1988: Maccabi Tel Aviv
- 1988–1993: Maccabi Rishon LeZion
- 1993–1994: Hapoel Jerusalem
- 1994–1995: Hapoel Tel Aviv

Career highlights
- FIBA Intercontinental Cup champion (1980); 2× EuroLeague champion (1977, 1981); 4× FIBA European All-Star (1978, 1981, 1982, 1987); 16× Israeli League champion (1972–1975, 1977–1988); 13× Israeli Cup winner (1972, 1973, 1975, 1977–1983, 1985, 1986, 1987); EuroBasket MVP (1979); FIBA's 50 Greatest Players (1991); Israel's Top Sportsmen of the 50 Year Jubilee (1948–1998); 50 Greatest EuroLeague Contributors (2008); 101 Greats of European Basketball (2018)
- FIBA Hall of Fame
Medals
Men's basketball
Representing Israel
FIBA EuroBasket
| Silver medal – second place | 1979 Italy |
Asian Games
| Gold medal – first place | 1974 Iran |

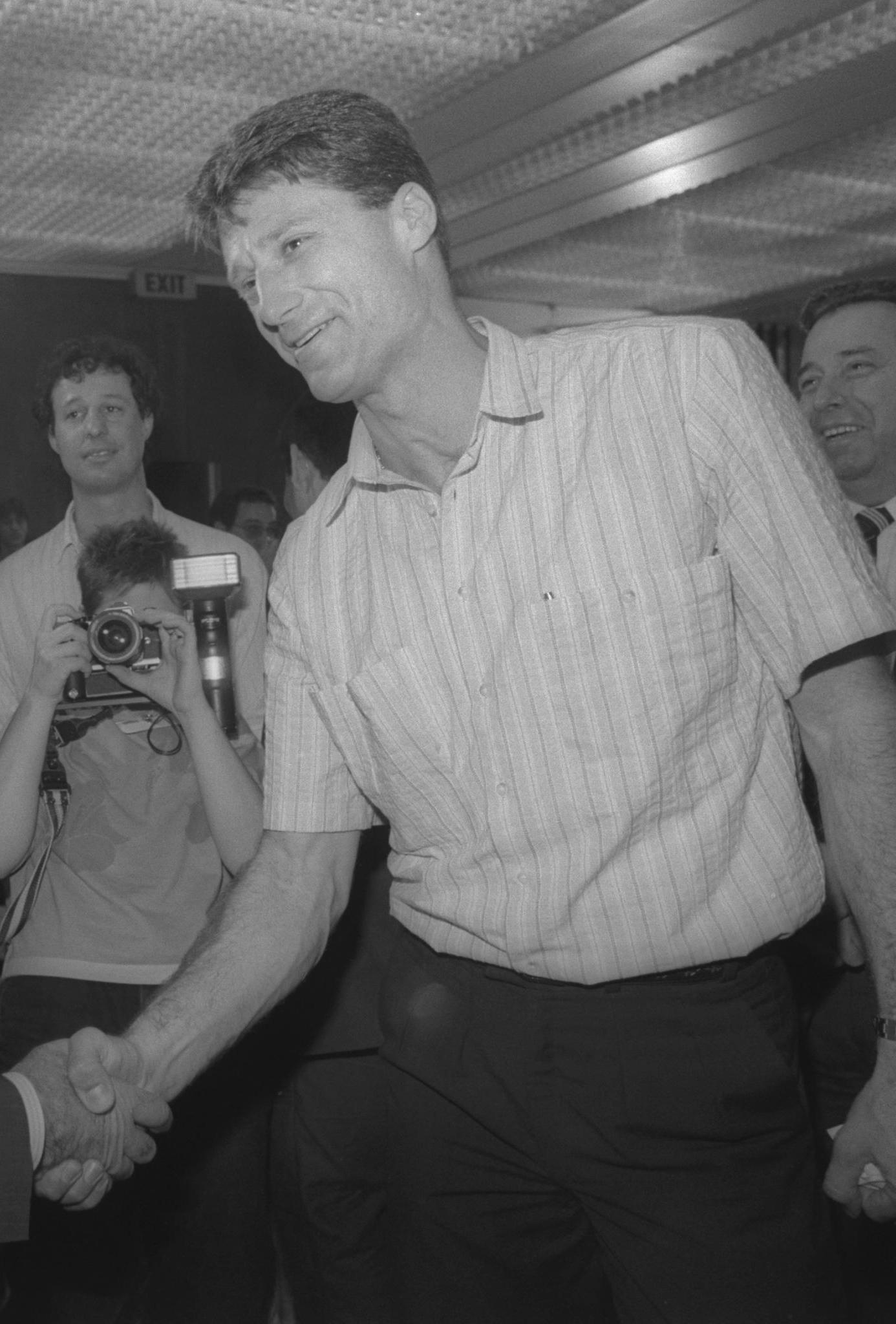
Berkovich in 1987

Moshe "Miki" Berkovich (or Mickey Berkowitz; Hebrew: משה "מיקי" ברקוביץ'; born 17 February 1954) is an Israeli former professional basketball player. A 193 cm shooting guard, he is considered to be one of the greatest Israeli basketball players of all time.

Berkovich was named one of FIBA's 50 Greatest Players in 1991. In 1998, he was named Israel's Top Sportsmen of the 50 Year Jubilee (1948–1998). He was named one of the 50 Greatest EuroLeague Contributors, by a select panel in February 2008, and was then honored at the 2008 EuroLeague Final Four in Madrid. He became a FIBA Hall of Fame player in 2017. In 2018, he was named one of the 101 Greats of European Basketball. In 2024, he received the Israel Prize in the category of outstanding athletic achievement.

In August 2026 it was revealed that Berkovich has Lewy body dementia and resides in a care facility

== Early years ==
Born in Kfar Saba, Berkovich began his long and distinguished career with Maccabi Tel Aviv, at the age of 11, when he joined the youth club. At the age of 15, he was playing for the junior squad. In 1971, at the age of 17, he made his debut with the senior men's team in Israel's top professional league.

== College playing career ==
In 1975, Berkovich played college basketball at UNLV in the United States. During the 1975–76 season, he played in 11 games and averaged 2.5 points per game as the Runnin' Rebels finished 28–1 and were the number one seed in the Western Region of the NCAA tournament. They defeated Boise State 103–78 in the first round, although Berkovich registered no points and only one rebound. UNLV then lost to Arizona 114–109 in the second round; Berkovich did not play in the game. He returned to Maccabi after just one year.

== Club playing career ==
Berkovich returned to Israel following the 1975–76 season and played a considerable role in Maccabi Tel Aviv's fortunes during the late 1970s and early 1980s.

In 1977, Berkovich helped Maccabi Tel Aviv to win its first FIBA European Champions Cup (EuroLeague) championship by defeating Mobilgirgi Varese by a score of 78–77 in the final, held in Pionir Hall, Belgrade, and CSKA Moscow 91–79 in the semifinals game held in Virton, Belgium. This achievement led to Tal Brody's famous statement of "We are on the map, not only in basketball".

In 1981, the second FIBA European Champions Cup title came for Maccabi, against another Italian team, Sinudyne Bologna. Berkovich scored the winning basket from an assist by Moti Aroesti, setting the score at 80–77. There were no three-point shots back then, so the Italians could only score a two-point basket in return. Maccabi won the game by a score of 80–79.

Berkovich's career in Maccabi came to an end in 1988 when he and Aroesti joined Maccabi Rishon LeZion. Later, he played with Hapoel Jerusalem and Hapoel Tel Aviv.

During his playing years with Maccabi, he won 16 Israeli national league championship titles and 13 Israeli national cups.

=== NBA offers ===
After the EuroBasket 1979, Berkovich had contract offers from the New Jersey Nets and the Atlanta Hawks from the NBA, but a contract with Maccabi Tel Aviv stood in the way. Maccabi's management insisted that he stay in the team, so they had to settle the case in civil court.

== National team career ==
In 1972, Berkovich took the Israeli under-18 national team to a fourth-place finish at the 1972 FIBA Europe Under-18 Championship and he was the leading scorer of the tournament. He also won a gold medal at the 1974 Asian Games in Tehran.

In 1979, Berkovich was a part of the senior Israeli national team that finished second at the 1979 EuroBasket in Turin. Berkovich was named the tournament's MVP.

Upon his retirement, he was second all-time in appearances (165) and points scored (2,842) among members of the senior men's Israeli national basketball team.

== Post-playing career ==
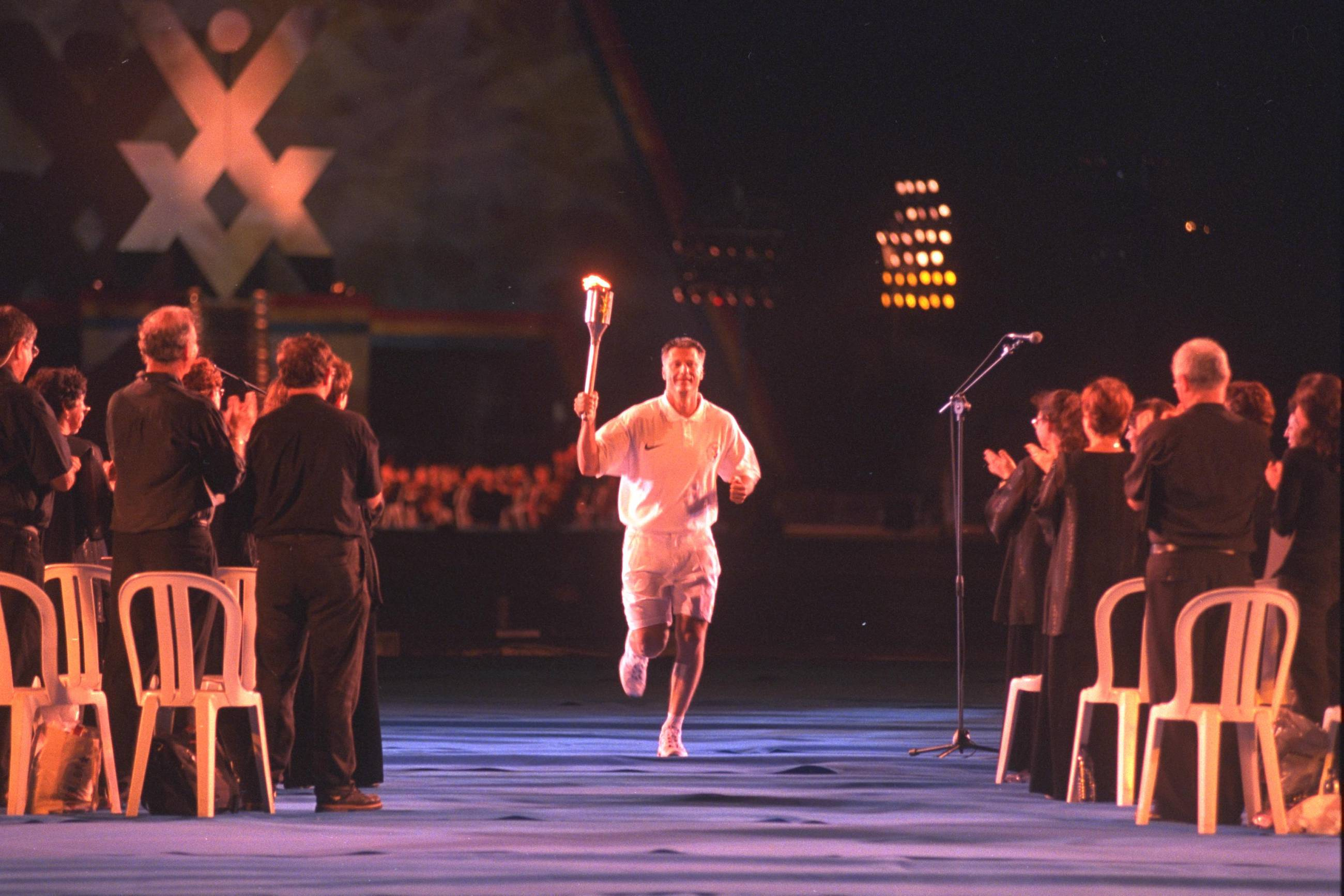
Berkovich carrying the torch at the opening ceremony of the 1997 Maccabiah Games at Ramat Gan Stadium

Berkovich retired from basketball in 1995, after which he wrote an autobiography called Born to Win. He went on to become the owner of the A.S. Ramat HaSharon basketball team. Both of his sons, Roi and Niv Berkovich, played for the team at the time. He later became the director of basketball operations of Ironi Nahariya, but left the team after just one year.

In August 2026, an Israeli Keshet 12 documentary by Niv Raskin revealed that Berkovich has Lewy body dementia and resides in a care facility. While the film sparked widespread public support, it drew sharp criticism from media outlets and medical organizations. Critics condemned the commercial network's sensationalist marketing and questioned the ethics of exposing a celebrity's cognitive decline without his informed consent.

== Honors ==
At both the 1977 and 1997 Maccabiah Games, Berkovich was honored as the final torchbearer who lit the ceremonial flame to officially open the event. In 1997, he did so jointly with American Olympic gymnast Kerri Strug.

== See also ==
- Israeli Premier League Statistical Leaders
- List of select Jewish basketball players
