= Walter Magnifico =

Italian basketball player and coach

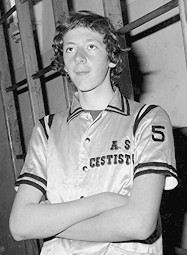
- Magnifico in 1975

Personal information
- Born: 18 June 1961 (age 65) San Severo, Italy
- Listed height: 6 ft 10.25 in (2.09 m)
- Listed weight: 232 lb (105 kg)

Career information
- Playing career: 1979–2004
- Position: Power forward / center
- Coaching career: 2004–2013

Career history

Playing
- 1979–1980: Fortitudo Bologna
- 1980–1996: VL Pesaro
- 1996–1997: Virtus Bologna
- 1997–1998: Virtus Roma
- 1998–2001: VL Pesaro
- 2003–2004: Pallacanestro Firenze
- 2004: NSB Rieti

Coaching
- 2004–2006: NSB Rieti (assistant)
- 2007: Cestistica San Severo
- 2009: Foligno Basket
- 2012–2013: Misano Pirates (Under-19 team)

Career highlights
- As a player: 4× FIBA European Selection (1987, 1991 2×, 1996); FIBA EuroStar (1996); FIBA Saporta Cup champion (1983); 2× Italian League champion (1988, 1990); 3× Italian Cup winner (1985, 1992, 1997)
Medals
Men's basketball
Representing Italy
EuroBasket
Bronze medal – third place	1985 West Germany
Silver medal – second place	1991 Italy

Walter Magnifico (born 18 June 1961) is an Italian former professional basketball player and coach. At a height of 2.09 m (6'10 1/4") tall, he played at the power forward and center positions. He is considered to be one of the best Italian basketball players ever, and he was among the 105 player nominees for the 50 Greatest EuroLeague Contributors list.

== Professional career ==
After playing with the junior teams of Cestistica San Severo, Magnifico spent most of his pro career with VL Pesaro, thus becoming one of the club's emblems. While in Pesaro, he led his team to a Saporta Cup title in 1983, two Italian League championships in 1988 and 1990, and two Italian Cup titles in 1985 and 1992. He also won a third Italian Cup after his transfer to Virtus Bologna, in 1997.

== National team career ==
Magnifico was a regular member of the senior Italian national team. He helped Italy win the bronze medal at the 1985 EuroBasket, and the silver medal at the 1991 EuroBasket.
