= Krystian Czernichowski =

Polish basketball player (1930–2014)

Personal information
- Nationality: Polish
- Born: 6 February 1930; Lwów, Poland
- Died: 13 November 2014 (aged 84); Luxembourg, Luxembourg

Sport
- Sport: Basketball

Krystian Czernichowski (6 February 1930 – 13 November 2014) was a Polish basketball player. He competed in the men's tournament at the 1964 Summer Olympics.
