= Rafael Rullán =

Spanish basketball player (1952–2025)

Personal information
- Born: 8 January 1952 Palma de Mallorca, Spain
- Died: 4 May 2025 (aged 73) Madrid, Spain
- Listed height: 7 ft 0 in (2.13 m)
- Listed weight: 236 lb (107 kg)

Career information
- Playing career: 1969–1988
- Position: Power forward / center

Career history
- 1969–1987: Real Madrid
- 1987–1988: Collado Villalba

Career highlights
- 5× FIBA Intercontinental Cup champion (1976–1978, 1981); 4× EuroLeague champion (1974, 1978–1980); 5× FIBA European Selection (1976, 1977, 1979, 1981 ×2); FIBA Saporta Cup champion (1984); 14× Spanish League champion (1970–1977, 1979, 1980, 1982, 1984–1986); 9× Spanish Cup winner (1970–1975, 1977, 1985, 1986)
Medals
Men's basketball
Representing Spain
FIBA EuroBasket
Silver medal – second place	1973 Spain

Rafael Rullán Ribera (8 January 1952 – 4 May 2025) was a Spanish professional basketball player. A talented center, whose versatility and range helped him to also play the power forward position, he was one of the stars of Real Madrid, throughout the 1970s and the 1980s.

== Club career ==
Rullán was a major contributor to Real's three EuroLeague titles in 1974, 1978, and 1980, as well as their FIBA Saporta Cup title in 1984. He had a memorable performance, with 27 points in the 1980 EuroLeague Final, against Maccabi Tel Aviv. He won 14 Spanish League championships, and 9 Spanish King's Cup titles, in his 18 seasons with the club.

== National team career ==
Rullán also shone with the senior Spain men's national basketball team, playing in 161 games, and winning the silver medal at the EuroBasket 1973.

== Death ==
Rullán died on 4 May 2025, at the age of 73.
