= Željko Jerkov =

Croatian basketball player

Personal information
- Born: November 6, 1953 (age 73) Pula, PR Croatia, FPR Yugoslavia
- Listed height: 6 ft 10 in (2.08 m)
- Listed weight: 210 lb (95 kg)

Career information
- Playing career: 1972–1984
- Position: Center

Career history
- 1972–1982: Split
- 1982–1983: VL Pesaro
- 1983–1984: Treviso

Career highlights
- As player: 3× FIBA European Selection (1976, 1978, 1982); FIBA Saporta Cup champion (1983); 2× FIBA Korać Cup champion (1976, 1977); Yugoslav League champion (1977); 2× Yugoslav Cup winner (1974, 1977)
Medals
Men's basketball
Representing Yugoslavia
Summer Olympics
Gold medal – first place	1980 Moscow
Silver medal – second place	1976 Montreal
FIBA World Cup
Bronze medal – third place	1982 Colombia
Gold medal – first place	1978 Philippines
Silver medal – second place	1974 Puerto Rico
EuroBasket
Bronze medal – third place	1979 Italy
Gold medal – first place	1977 Belgium
Gold medal – first place	1975 Yugoslavia
Gold medal – first place	1973 Spain
European Championship for Juniors
Gold medal – first place	1972 Yugoslavia	Under-20

Željko Jerkov (born 6 November 1953, in Pula) is a former Croatian professional basketball player. At a height of 2.08 m (6 ft 10 in) tall, and a weight of 95 kg (209 lb), he played at the center position.

== Professional career ==
Jerkov was a member of the FIBA European Selection, in 1976, 1978, and 1982.

== National team career ==
Jerkov competed with the senior Yugoslav national basketball team at the 1976 Summer Olympics, where he won a silver medal, and at the 1980 Summer Olympics, where he won a gold medal.

== Awards and accomplishments ==
=== Clubs ===
- 2× Yugoslav Cup Winner: (1974, 1977)
- 2× FIBA Korać Cup Champion: (1976, 1977)
- 3× FIBA European Selection: (1976, 1978, 1982)
- Yugoslav League Champion: (1977)
- FIBA Saporta Cup Champion: (1983)

Preceded by Branko Grgić	President of Hajduk Split; January 2008 – March 2008	Succeeded by Mate Peroš
