= 2025–26 Virtus Bologna season =

Basketball team season

Virtus Bologna
2025–26 season
- Owner: Massimo Zanetti
- President: Massimo Zanetti
- Head coach: Nenad Jakovljević
- Arena: Virtus Arena
- LBA: 3rd
- EuroLeague: 17th
- Italian Cup: Semifinalist
- Supercup: Semifinalist

The 2025–26 season is Virtus Bologna's 97th in existence and the club's 9th consecutive season in the top flight of Italian basketball.

== Kit ==
Supplier: Adidas / Sponsor: TBA (for EuroLeague) – Olidata (for LBA)

Home	Away

== Players ==
=== Current roster ===
Virtus Olidata Bologna roster
Players
Coaches

Pos.	No.	Nat.	Name	Ht.	Wt.	Age
G	1	(Argentina)	Vildoza, Luca	1.91 m (6 ft 3 in)	86 kg (190 lb)	30 – 11 August 1995
G	2	(Italy)	Baiocchi, Matteo	1.96 m (6 ft 5 in)	91 kg (201 lb)	19 – 2 August 2007
G	3	(United States)	Edwards, Carsen	1.80 m (5 ft 11 in)	91 kg (201 lb)	28 – 12 March 1998
PG	6	(Italy)	Pajola, Alessandro (injured) (C)	1.94 m (6 ft 4 in)	95 kg (209 lb)	26 – 9 November 1999
F	7	(Italy)	Niang, Saliou	1.99 m (6 ft 6 in)	86 kg (190 lb)	22 – 14 May 2004
G	8	(Italy)	Accorsi, Matteo	1.91 m (6 ft 3 in)	85 kg (187 lb)	19 – 13 May 2007
F/C	9	(Serbia)	Smailagić, Alen	2.08 m (6 ft 10 in)	98 kg (216 lb)	25 – 18 August 2000
F	21	(United States)	Alston Jr., Derrick (injured)	2.06 m (6 ft 9 in)	86 kg (190 lb)	28 – 17 September 1997
G	23	(Italy)	Hackett, Daniel	1.96 m (6 ft 5 in)	97 kg (214 lb)	38 – 19 December 1987
SF	24	(Italy)	Ferrari, Francesco	2.04 m (6 ft 8 in)	90 kg (198 lb)	20 – 18 August 2005
G	30	(United States)	Morgan, Matt	1.93 m (6 ft 4 in)	84 kg (185 lb)	28 – 7 November 1997
C	31	(Mali)	Diarra, Aliou	2.08 m (6 ft 10 in)	95 kg (209 lb)	24 – 31 December 2001
F	34	(Germany)	Jallow, Karim	1.98 m (6 ft 6 in)	90 kg (198 lb)	29 – 13 April 1997
C	35	(Italy)	Diouf, Mouhamet	2.08 m (6 ft 10 in)	108 kg (238 lb)	24 – 10 September 2001
F	45	(Italy)	Akele, Nicola	2.03 m (6 ft 8 in)	96 kg (212 lb)	30 – 7 November 1995
PG	99	(Brazil)	dos Santos, Yago	1.73 m (5 ft 8 in)	80 kg (176 lb)	27 – 9 March 1999

Head coach

- (Serbia) Nenad Jakovljević

Assistant coach(es)

- (Italy) Daniele Parente
- (Italy) Cristian Fedrigo
- (Italy) Roberto Bellini
- (Italy) Samuele Mongardi

Athletic trainer(s)

- (Italy) Federico Conti

Legend

- (C) Team captain
- Injured

- Roster
Updated: January 13, 2026

Note: Flags indicate national team eligibility at FIBA-sanctioned events. Players may hold other non-FIBA nationalities not displayed.

=== Depth chart ===
Pos.	Starting 5	Bench 1	Bench 2	Inactive
C	Mouhamet Diouf	Aliou Diarra		Alen Smailagić
PF	Karim Jallow	Nicola Akele		Derrick Alston Jr. (injured)
SF	Saliou Niang	Daniel Hackett	Francesco Ferrari
SG	Carsen Edwards	Matt Morgan	Matteo Accorsi
PG	Luca Vildoza	Yago dos Santos	Matteo Baiocchi	Alessandro Pajola (injured)

(colors: Italian or homegrown players; foreign players; young players)

=== Squad changes ===
==== In ====
No.	Pos.	Nat.	Name	Age	Moving from		Type	Ends	Transfer fee	Date	Source
	PG	(Argentina)	Luca Vildoza	29	Olympiacos B.C.	(Greece)	3 years	June 2028	Free	25 June 2025	
	PF	(United States)	Derrick Alston Jr.	27	Bàsquet Manresa	(Spain)	2 years	June 2027	Free	28 June 2025	
	F/C	(Serbia)	Alen Smailagić	24	BC Žalgiris	(Lithuania)	2 years	June 2027	€300,000	9 July 2025	
	G	(United States)	Carsen Edwards	27	FC Bayern Munich	(Germany)	1 year	June 2026	Free	11 July 2025	
	F	(Germany)	Karim Jallow	28	Ratiopharm Ulm	(Germany)	2 years	June 2027	Free	14 July 2025	
	SG	(Italy)	Abramo Canka	23	Wake Forest	(United States)	2 years	June 2027	Free	15 July 2025	
	SF	(Italy) (Senegal)	Saliou Niang	21	Aquila Basket Trento	(Italy)	2 years	June 2027	Free	16 July 2025	
