= 2026–27 LBA season =

Italian professional basketball season

LBA
- League: Lega Basket Serie A
- Season: 2026–2027
- Dates: 26 September 2026 – June 2027
- Teams: 16

Lega Basket Serie A seasons
- ← 2025–26 2027–28 →

The 2026–27 LBA season is the 105th season of the Lega Basket Serie A (LBA), the men's top tier professional basketball division of the Italian basketball league system.

It will begin on September 26, 2026, and Olimpia Milano are the defending champions.

== Teams ==
Number of teams	Region	Team(s)
3	Lombardy	Olimpia Milano; Pallacanestro Cantù; Pallacanestro Varese
3	Veneto	Reyer Venezia; Scaligera Basket Verona; Universo Treviso Basket
2	Campania	Napoli Basket; Scafati Basket
2	Emilia-Romagna	Pallacanestro Reggiana; Virtus Bologna
2	Friuli-Venezia Giulia	APU Udine; Pallacanestro Trieste
2	Lazio	BC Roma; Maxima Roma
1	Piedmont	Derthona Basket
1	Trentino-Alto Adige/Südtirol	Aquila Basket Trento

Location of teams in 2026–27 LBA season

Team	Home city	Arena	Capacity	2025–26 result
APU Udine	Udine	PalaCarnera	3,850	13th
Aquila Basket Trento	Trento	PalaTrento	4,360	8th
BC Roma	Rome	Palazzetto dello Sport	3,534	took over Cremona's berth
Derthona Basket	Tortona	PalaFerraris	3,510	5th
Maxima Roma	Rome	PalaLottomatica	11,200	took over Brescia's berth
Napoli Basket	Naples	PalaBarbuto	5,500	10th
Olimpia Milano	Milan	Forum di Milano	12,331	3rd (Champions)
Pallacanestro Cantù	Cantù	PalaDesio	6,700	14th
Pallacanestro Trieste 2004	Trieste	PalaTrieste	6,943	7th
Pallacanestro Varese	Varese	Palasport Lino Oldrini	5,107	9th
Reyer Venezia	Venice	Palasport Taliercio	3,506	4th
Scaligera Basket	Verona	PalaOlimpia	5,043	promoted to LBA
Scafati Basket	Scafati	PalaMangano	3,500	promoted to LBA
Pallacanestro Reggiana	Reggio Emilia	PalaBigi	4,530	6th
Universo Treviso Basket	Treviso	PalaVerde	5,134	12th
Virtus Bologna	Bologna	Unipol Hall	11,000	1st

== Regular season ==
In the regular season, teams play against each other home-and-away in a round-robin format. The matchdays are from 26 September 2026 to 9 May 2027.

Points scored in overtime counts toward tiebreakers. Tiebreakers are based on articule 62 of Regolamento Esecutivo Gare.

Pos	Team	Pld	W	L	PF	PA	PD	Pts	Qualification
1	Virtus Bologna	7	6	1	675	602	+73	12	Qualification to Playoffs
2	Napoli Basket	7	6	1	656	606	+50	12	Qualification to Playoffs
3	Olimpia Milano	7	5	2	636	579	+57	10	Qualification to Playoffs
4	Maxima Roma	7	5	2	617	586	+31	10	Qualification to Playoffs
5	Universo Treviso Basket	7	5	2	635	620	+15	10	Qualification to Playoffs
6	APU Udine	7	4	3	569	562	+7	8	Qualification to Playoffs
7	Reyer Venezia	7	4	3	615	620	−5	8	Qualification to Playoffs
8	Pallacanestro Varese	7	4	3	614	613	+1	8	Qualification to Playoffs
9	Pallacanestro Trieste 2004	7	4	3	661	619	+42	8	
10	Scaligera Basket Verona	7	3	4	619	638	−19	6	
11	Aquila Basket Trento	7	3	4	563	585	−22	6	
12	BC Roma	7	2	5	701	695	+6	4	
13	Pallacanestro Reggiana	7	2	5	572	586	−14	4	
14	Derthona Tortona	7	2	5	586	637	−51	4	
15	Scafati Basket	7	1	6	571	644	−73	2	Relegation to Serie A2
16	Pallacanestro Cantù	7	0	7	538	636	−98	0	Relegation to Serie A2

Updated to match(es) played on 11 November 2026. Source: LBA

=== Results ===
Home \ Away	BOL	BCR	CAN	MAX	MIL	NAP	REG	SCA	TNT	TOR	TRI	TRV	UDI	VAR	VEN	VER
Bologna	—			98–89				108–83			93–100					95–81
BC Roma		—						103–90		108–70					98–104	
Cantù			—		82–95	80–99							84–85			
Maxima		96–95	99–87	—		75–94							81–75			
Milano	94–98				—				88–86		83–79	106–77				
Napoli					82–98	—	99–93								99–81	
Reggiana			81–60				—		78–83	93–86					78–83	
Scafati						89–91		—	87–81					77–85		82–89
Trento				62–88					—			90–93		87–85		
Tortona				75–89		90–92				—		87–76				101–93
Trieste		116–100	92–72								—				82–87	108–99
Treviso		109–94					81–68					—	102–86			
Udine								87–63	66–74	86–77			—			
Varese	69–90	110–103									85–84		81–84	—		
Venezia	86–93		85–73									89–87			—	
Verona					75–72		94–81							88–99		—

Source: LBA
Legend: Blue = home team win; Red = away team win.
Matches with lighter background shading were decided after overtime.

== Italian clubs in European competitions ==
Team	Competition	Progress
Olimpia Milano	EuroLeague	Regular season
Virtus Bologna	EuroLeague	Regular season
Aquila Basket Trento	EuroCup	Regular season
BC Roma	EuroCup	Regular season
Derthona Basket	EuroCup	Regular season
Maxima Roma	EuroCup	Regular season
Napoli Basket	EuroCup	Regular season
Reyer Venezia	EuroCup	Regular season
Pallacanestro Reggiana	Champions League	Regular season
Pallacanestro Varese	Champions League	Regular season
