= Virtus Bologna =

Italian professional basketball club

- 2026–27 Virtus Bologna season
- Nickname: Vu Nere (Black V)
- Leagues: LBA; EuroLeague
- Founded: 1927; 99 years ago
- History: Virtus Pallacanestro Bologna; 1927–present
- Arena: Unipol Hall
- Capacity: 11,000
- Location: Bologna, Italy
- Team colors: White, black
- Main sponsor: Costa Cruises
- President: Massimo Zanetti
- Head coach: Álex Mumbrú
- Team captain: Daniel Hackett
- Ownership: Massimo Zanetti
- International titles: 2 EuroLeague; 1 EuroCup; 1 Saporta Cup; 1 Champions League; 1 EuroChallenge
- Domestic titles: 17 Italian Championships; 8 Italian Cups; 4 Italian Supercups; 1 Italian Serie A2; 1 Italian LNP Cup
- Retired numbers: 3 (4, 5, 10)
- Website: virtus.it
Home	Away

Virtus Pallacanestro Bologna, known for sponsorship reasons as Virtus Costa Bologna, is an Italian professional basketball club based in Bologna, Emilia-Romagna.

The club was founded in 1927, which makes it the oldest club in Italy and one of the oldest in Europe. Virtus is the second most titled basketball club in Italy after Olimpia Milano, having won 17 Italian national championships, 8 Italian National Cups and 4 Italian Supercups. Moreover, it is one of the most successful teams in European competitions, having won two EuroLeagues, one EuroCup, one FIBA Saporta Cup, one EuroChallenge and one Basketball Champions League. It currently plays in the Italian first division LBA as well as in the EuroLeague. The club is owned by the coffee entrepreneur Massimo Zanetti.

Some of the club's star players over the years have included: Gianni Bertolotti, Tom McMillen, Carlo Caglieris, Renato Villalta, Marco Bonamico, Jim McMillian, Krešimir Ćosić, Roberto Brunamonti, Augusto Binelli, Micheal Ray Richardson, Predrag Danilović, Cliff Levingston, Arijan Komazec, Zoran Savić, Alessandro Abbio, Radoslav Nesterović, Antoine Rigaudeau, Alessandro Frosini, Hugo Sconochini, Marko Jarić, Manu Ginóbili, Rashard Griffith, Matjaž Smodiš, David Andersen, Travis Best, Keith Langford, Miloš Teodosić, Marco Belinelli, Daniel Hackett and Tornike Shengelia. While some of the club's greatest coaches have been: Vittorio Tracuzzi, Dan Peterson, Terry Driscoll, Alberto Bucci, Ettore Messina, Aleksandar Đorđević, Sergio Scariolo and Duško Ivanović.

== History ==
=== 1927–1956: Beginnings and post-war dynasty ===
Virtus was founded in 1871 as a gymnastics club, forming its first professional basketball team in 1927 — considered the first reunion of members and players — as part of a multi sports club. The club's motto was Forte Franco Fermo Fiero ("Strong Frank Firm Proud") and was inserted in the logo under the Black V, with a cross made by four F; the motto is still used by Virtus today. The team's home court was the former church of Santa Lucia in the city center, which could host a few hundred people.

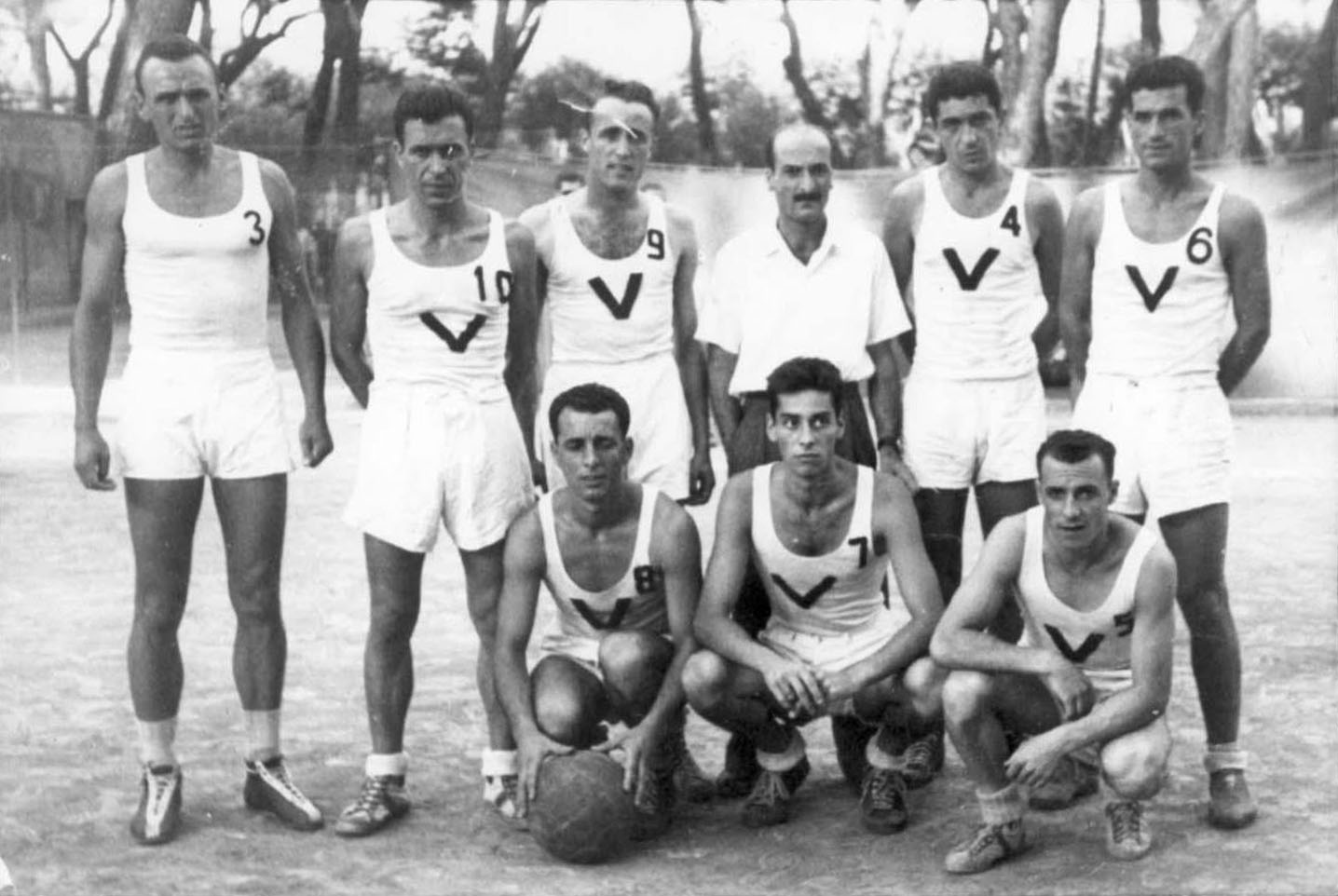
Virtus team in 1945–46 season

The first official championship of Virtus dates back to 1929. From 1929 to 1934, Virtus played in the first and second divisions within Emilia region. In 1934, the Bolognese team won the division tournament, obtaining the promotion in the top tournament after a hard-fought group of playoffs against Unione Sportiva of Milan and Ginnastica Rome. Team's captain was Venzo Vannini, while other important players were Giuseppe Palmieri and Giancarlo Marinelli. After the promotion, Virtus settled permanently at the top of the national basketball league, and achieved a long series of honorable placings: in the nine championships disputed from 1935 to the outbreak of the Second World War, the Black V collected 6-second places, 2 third places, and a sixth place, however Virtus never achieved to win a national title.

From 1943 to 1945, the championship was suspended due to the outbreak of the war in the country and the beginning of the civil war. At the end of the world war, Santa Lucia was no longer available for basketball games and after a brief period of outdoor matches on a field in Via del Ravone, the team moved to Sala Borsa, the city's stock exchange, readjusted in the evening for basketball matches. This unusual venue became the hallmark of a new Italian basketball season, compared to the worldwide famous Boston Garden. In July 1945, Virtus, led by Achille Canna, Luigi Rapini and Antonio Calebotta, won its first national Serie A title, defeating 35–31 Reyer Venezia in the final.

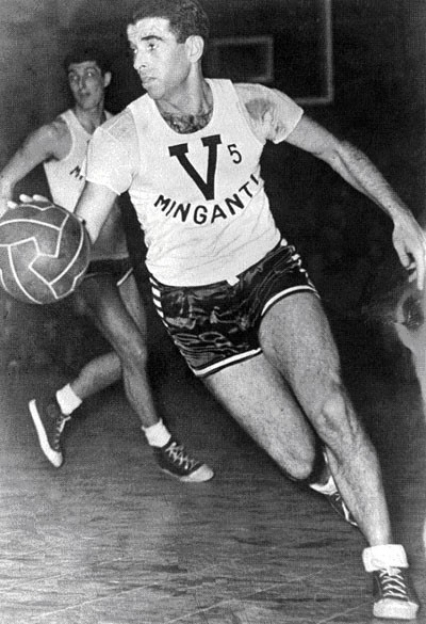
Vittorio Tracuzzi at the Sala Borsa court

In the following season, Renzo Poluzzi became the new head coach and led Virtus to its second championship. Under Poluzzi, Virtus won the title again in 1948 and 1949, achieving the so-called "four-peat". In 1949–50 season, the Black V arrived second after Olimpia Milano; during these years, the long-time rivalry with Olimpia, known as "derby of Italy", began. Olimpia won the title for the next four years too, while the Black V placed second in 1952 and 1953. In 1954, Vittorio Tracuzzi was appointed new head coach; Tracuzzi was a Virtus player too, acting as a "player-coach". At the end of the season, Tracuzzi led Virtus to its fifth national title. The team doubled the next season, achieving a so-called "back-to-back". During the 1950s the first derbies were played against Gira and Moto Morini, the other two teams of Bologna.

Due to the increasing fame of Virtus, the Sala Borsa was no longer suitable for hosting games; so in 1956, the long-time Mayor of Bologna, Giuseppe Dozza, inaugurated a new arena, which was simply known as "Sports Hall" and had a seating capacity of more than 7,000 people. The arena was later nicknamed Il Madison, after New York's Madison Square Garden and, in 1966, after Dozza's retirement from politics, it was renamed "PalaDozza". From 1956 to 1960, Virtus placed second, always behind its arch-rival Olimpia Milan. At the end of the 1959–60 season, Tracuzzi left Virtus after having won two championships in five seasons, with a winning record of 108–22, being widely considered one of Black V's greatest coaches of all time.

=== 1960–1968: Post-dynasty struggles ===
In 1960, the Spanish coach, Eduardo Kucharski, succeeded Tracuzzi at the head of the team. Virtus, led by its best player Gianfranco Lombardi, took part in its first European Champions Cup, but it was ousted by CCA Bucarest in the second round. At the end of the Italian regular season, the Black V placed second again, behind Ignis Varese.

In 1962 and 1963 Virtus arrived third and Kucharski was sacked, while Mario Alesini, a former Virtus player, became the new head coach. However, in the next three seasons, Alesini did not reach to bring back the title to Bologna. In 1966, Jaroslav Šíp was hired as new head coach, but Virtus never became a real contender for the championship, with Olimpia and Ignis which alternatively won the title until 1968.

=== 1968–1991: The Porelli era ===
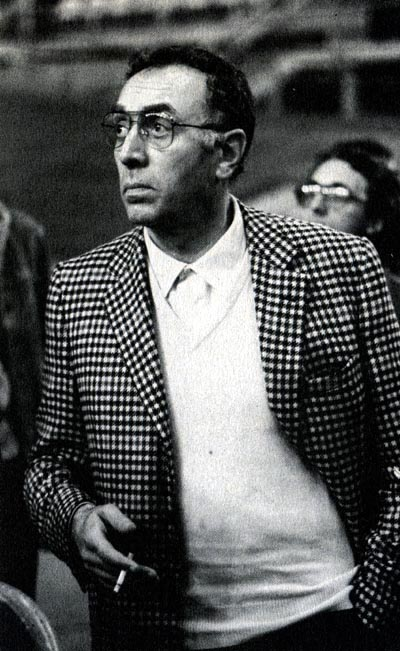
Gianluigi Porelli, president and manager for 23 years

The 1960s had been an unfortunate decade for Virtus. The turning point occurred in 1968, when the lawyer Gianluigi Porelli was appointed by the then president of the multi-sport club, Giovanni Elkan, at the head of the basketball section. Alternately nicknamed "Torquemada" or "Robespierre" for his quick and often dictatorial methods, or, more frequently, L'Avvocato ("The Lawyer"), Porelli has been one of the most prominent figures in the history of Virtus which, through initiatives often unpopular but almost always winning, definitively carried towards professionalism.

==== 1968–1973: Rebuilding ====
As soon as he arrived, at only 38 years old, Porelli sacked coach Šíp and appointed Renzo Ranuzzi, a former player. However, Ranuzzi lasted one year only, due to the poor result of the team, which ended the season at the 10th place. After another poor result in the 1969–70 season under coach Nello Paratore, in 1970, Porelli hired Black V's legendary coach Vittorio Tracuzzi and sold the best player of the time, Gianfranco Lombardi, unleashing a popular uprising that even ended up in court. Despite Tracuzzi's comeback, the team placed 10th once again. In 1970, thanks to Porelli, Virtus was also one of the main proponents and founders of the Lega Basket, the governing body of the top-tier level professional Italian basketball league.

In the same year, Virtus broke away from the multi sports club, becoming a joint-stock company. Thanks to this choice, which was highly criticised at the time, Porelli definitively healed the club's finances. In 1971, Porelli hired the American player John Fultz who, supported by important Italian players like Gianni Bertolotti and Luigi Serafini, succeeded in placing the team 5th in the national championship, the best result since 1967–68. In the following season, the team, composed by the same players and coached by Nico Messina, arrived 6th.

==== 1973–1978: Peterson's revolution ====
In 1973, Porelli opened a new season of triumphs, thanks to a partnership with Sinudyne, a famous Italian domestic appliances company, and especially with the engagement of the young American coach Dan Peterson, coming from the Chile's national basketball team. Virtus immediately won its first Italian Cup in 1973–74 season, which was club's first title since 1955–56.

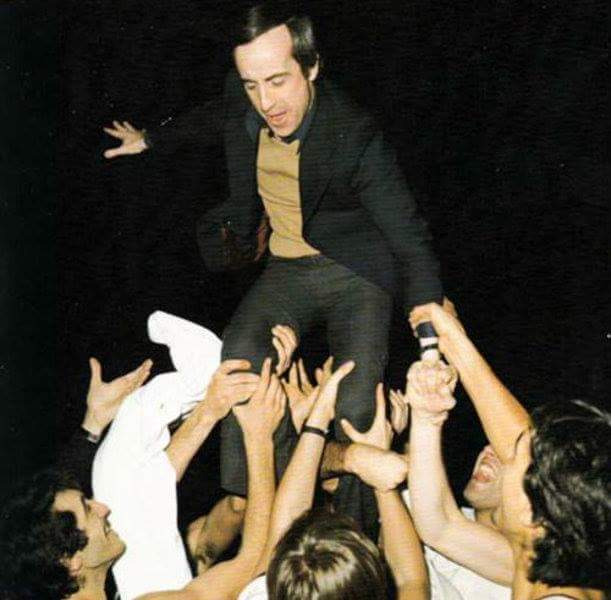
Dan Peterson celebrating the 1976 championship

In the following season, Virtus signed Tom McMillen, a 22-years-old player from Maryland University, who was selected with the 9th overall pick by the Buffalo Braves during the 1974 NBA draft. He signed with the Braves but postponed his entry into the NBA to attend the University of Oxford as a Rhodes Scholar. McMillen lived and studied in the UK, but he moved to Bologna during the weekends to play basketball. At the end of the season, characterized by outstanding performances by McMillen, the team placed 4th in the national championship and was eliminated at the quarterfinals of the European Cup Winners' Cup.

In 1975, McMillen started his career in the NBA, so Porelli and Peterson signed Terry Driscoll, a former NBA player and 4th overall pick in 1969 draft. Thanks to Driscoll's leadership and the fundamental support of Italian players like Carlo Caglieris, Gianni Bertolotti, Marco Bonamico and Luigi Serafini, Virtus won its seventh national championship, the first one after twenty years.

In 1976–77, Virtus ended first in the regular season, however it lost the championship finals against Varese, by 2–0. In the following season, the Black V succeeded in reaching the national finals, but nonetheless it lost 2–1 against Varese again. The team also reached the final of the Cup Winner's Cup, but lost 84–82 against Gabetti Cantù.

In 1978, after two consecutive second places, coach Peterson left the Black V to sign with its historic rival, Olimpia Milan. This move was heavily criticised by Black V's fans, but it was approved by Porelli himself. However, despite the controversies which rose around his farewell, Peterson's legacy was huge: the American coach deeply changed the team's organization and contributed in bringing back Virtus to the top of Italian basketball after twenty years of struggles.

==== 1978–1980: Driscoll's back-to-back ====
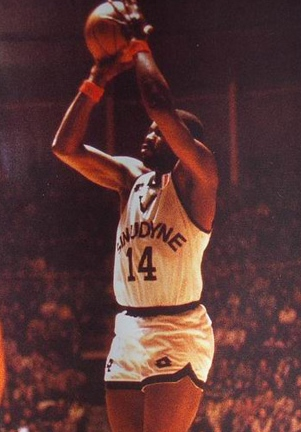
Jim McMillian in PalaDozza

After Peterson's departure, Terry Driscoll was appointed new head coach. Porelli signed also Krešimir Ćosić, one of the best centers in Europe; the team was also composed by great Italian players as Renato Villalta, Carlo Caglieris and the captain Gianni Bertolotti. In the national finals, Virtus faced its former coach, Dan Peterson and his new team, Olimpia. Despite the great expectations around a hard-fought final, the Black V easily won the title in only two games. The team also reached the semi-finals of the Cup Winners' Cup, where it was eliminated for only one point by the Dutch EBBC.

In the following season, Porelli signed Jim McMillian, a 1972 NBA champion with the Los Angeles Lakers. McMillian, who was immediately nicknamed by Virtus fans as Il Duca Nero ("The Black Duke"), led the team achieving a back-to-back, winning its ninth titles against Cantù. The team took part also in the European Champions Cup, where it was eliminated in the semi-finals group stage.

At the end of the season, Driscoll's two-year contract had expired. Porelli and Driscoll could not agree on a contract. Despite Driscoll's great successes, first as player, one championship, and two championships as a coach in five years, when no agreement was reached, Driscoll chose to return to retire from basketball.

==== 1980–1988: Champions Cup Final and 10th title ====
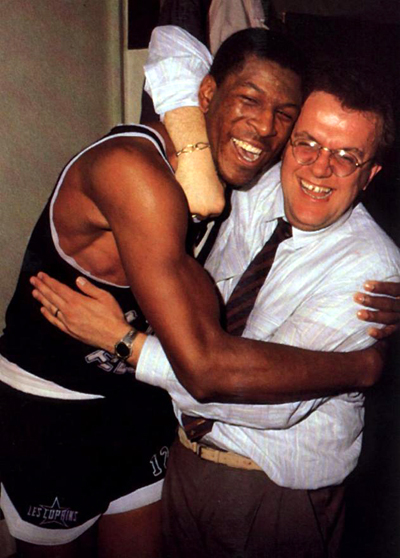
Alberto Bucci and Elvis Rolle, after the 1984 title

At the beginning of the 1980–81 season, Driscoll's assistant, Ettore Zuccheri, became the new head coach, but he was later replaced by Renzo Ranuzzi. The team reached once again the national finals, but it slightly lost the playoff series by 2–1 against Cantù. Returning to the top in Italy, the Black V attempted to become a major team in Europe too, and in 1981, Virtus reached the final of the FIBA European Champions Cup in Strasbourg. However, a few days before the final, McMillian suffered a serious injury against Brindisi and was forced not to play in the final, which then Virtus lost by only one point against Maccabi Tel Aviv, after a very contested game dominated by an outstanding Marco Bonamico, as well as dubious referees' choices.

After the defeat in the Cup, Porelli sacked Ranuzzi and hired coach Aleksandar Nikolić, worldwide known as "The Professor". The team was composed also by young and talented Italian players like Roberto Brunamonti and Augusto Binelli, as well as important foreign players, like the Bahamian center Elvis Rolle. Despite his fame, Nikolić did not succeed in bringing Virtus back to title, so in 1983, after the brief experiences of George Bisacca and Mauro Di Vincenzo, the 35 years-old Alberto Bucci, from Bologna, became the new head coach. In the same years, the club signed a deal with Granarolo, a milk and dairy production company, which became the new team's sponsor. The skilled American small forward Jan van Breda Kolff was also added to the roster. Virtus ended the regular season second, after Peterson's Olimpia. The two teams faced each other in a historic final, always remembered as one of the best in Italian basketball history, in which Virtus defeated Olimpia by 2–1, reaching its 10th national title, also known as La Stella ("The Star"), due to the star which is attributed to teams that manage to win ten national championships. In the same year, the team completed a domestic double by adding a National Cup.

In 1984–85, Virtus reached the semi-final group stage of the Champions Cup, where, however, it was eliminated. After a defeat in the playoffs' quarterfinals against Olimpia, Bucci was sacked and Sandro Gamba became the new coach. Gamba, one of the most successful Italian coaches of all time, did not succeed in winning with Virtus too, exiting in the first round of 1986 playoffs and being eliminated in the quarterfinals of 1987 playoffs. In 1988, Krešimir Ćosić, a former Virtus star, replaced Gamba. Despite the head coach's change, the team continued collecting poor successes, being ousted in the Korać Cup's quarterfinals and in the first round of national playoffs.

==== 1988–1991: The "Sugar-mania" ====
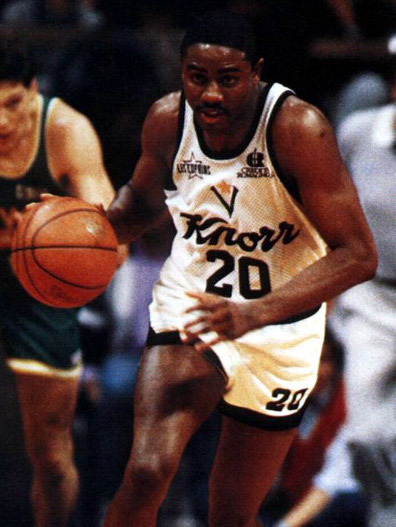
Micheal Ray Richardson, the protagonist of "Sugar-mania", which involved Bologna in the late 1980s

In 1988, Porelli hired Bob Hill, who was New York Knicks' head coach until the previous season. Hill brought in Italy two former NBA players: Micheal Ray Richardson, worldwide known as "Sugar", an NBA All-Star and former player for the Knicks and New Jersey Nets, who was banned from the NBA for violations of league's drug policy, and Clemon Johnson, 1983 NBA champion with the Philadelphia 76ers, who also played for the Indiana Pacers and Seattle SuperSonics. At the beginning of the season, Porelli reached an agreement with Knorr, a German food and beverage brand, which became the team's sponsor. In 1988–89 Virtus won its third Italian Cup, but it was defeated in the semi-finals for the national championship against Enichem Livorno, coached by Bucci.

Despite the playoffs' elimination, the season was considered a rebirth for Virtus: the national cup was the team's first trophy since 1984 and the great performances of Richardson had brought back the passion for basketball in the city. This period became known as "Sugar-mania", from Richardson's historic nickname.

In the following summer, Hill surprisingly resigned from his post and his assistant, the 30 years-old Ettore Messina, was appointed new head coach. The Black V won the Italian Cup again and on 13 March 1990, won its first European title, the FIBA European Cup Winners' Cup, the second-tier level European-wide competition, defeating 79–74 the Real Madrid coached by George Karl. The final was characterized by an outstanding performance of Richardson, able of scoring 29 points. However, the team was once again eliminated in national playoffs' quarterfinals against Phonola Caserta.

In 1990–91, Virtus placed third in the regular season but it was once again eliminated in the national semi-finals by Caserta. At the end of the season, Richardson was not confirmed and signed for Slobodna Dalmacija, putting an end to a three-year period in which he brought Virtus to win its first European trophy and laid the foundations for club's successes in the following years.

In 1991, after two years of internal struggles within the shareholders' assembly, during which he also briefly lost the control of the club, Porelli sold Virtus to Alfredo Cazzola, a local trade fair entrepreneur. During 23 years of tenure, Porelli won four national titles, four Italian Cups and one Cup Winner's Cup, transforming a simple basketball section of a multisport club into one of the richest and most successful teams in Europe.

=== 1991–2000: The Cazzola era ===
As president, Cazzola brought to Virtus an entrepreneurial mentality, which would be necessary in the team's future growth. In the 1991–92 season, the Black V, led by captain Brunamonti and Jure Zdovc, reached the national semi-finals, but lost against Scavolini Pesaro, which had already eliminated Virtus in the national cup few months before. The team also lost against Partizan in the FIBA European League quarterfinals.

==== 1992–1995: Danilović's three-peat ====
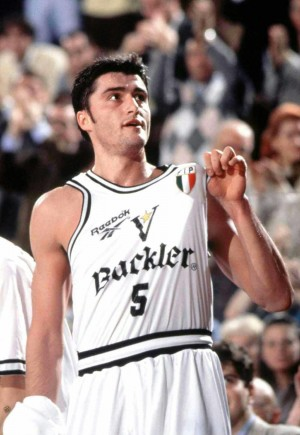
Predrag Danilović in 1995, unanimously considered the greatest player in Virtus history

In the summer of 1992, Cazzola signed Predrag Danilović, a young Yugoslav player who won the latest FIBA European League with Partizan. Under the strong leadership of Danilović and the important support of Brunamonti, Claudio Coldebella, Paolo Moretti, Augusto Binelli and Bill Wennington, the team, coached by Ettore Messina, won its eleventh national championship, defeating 3–0 the Benetton Treviso. However the team was eliminated in the quarterfinals of the FIBA European League by Real Madrid Teka.

In the following season, Messina became the new coach of Italy's national basketball team and Alberto Bucci, returned to coach Virtus, with whom he had won a national championship in 1984. The team was completed with Cliff Levingston, two-time NBA champion with the Chicago Bulls. In the same year, Cazzola signed a deal with Buckler Beer, a brand of Heineken, which became the new sponsor of the team. In October 1993, Virtus took part to the McDonald's Open in Munich, where it arrived second, after the Phoenix Suns. In May 1994, Virtus won its second consecutive national title, defeating 3–2 Scavolini Pesaro, after a very contested final. Once again, the Black V was ousted during the FIBA European League quarterfinals by Olympiacos.

In the 1994–95 season, Joe Binion replaced Levingston, while the rest of the team remained untouched. In May 1995, Virtus won its 13th title, defeating 3–0 Benetton Treviso, accomplishing a so-called "three-peat". However, for the third consecutive times, the team which dominated the Italian league was eliminated at the FIBA European League quarterfinals, this time by Panathinaikos.

==== 1995–1997: Transition years and Brunamonti's retirement ====
After the three-peat, Danilović left Virtus for the Miami Heat. Cazzola signed Arijan Komazec, a Croatian guard-forward, and Orlando Woolridge, a long-time NBA player; while young Italian players like Alessandro Abbio became increasingly important. In September 1995, Virtus won its first Italian Supercup against Benetton Treviso; while in October, the Black V participated in the McDonald's Championship, arriving second after the Houston Rockets. The team ended the regular season in first place, but he was eventually eliminated by Stefanel Milano in the playoffs' semi-finals. Moreover, the team did not succeed in passing the second group stage of the Champions Cup.

In 1996, captain Roberto Brunamonti retired from basketball after 14 seasons as a Virtus player. During the summer, the club signed important international players like Zoran Savić from Real Madrid Teka and Branislav Prelević from PAOK. Moreover, Kinder, a product brand line of Italian confectionery multinational Ferrero SpA, became the new sponsor of Virtus. On 8 March 1997, coach Bucci was replaced by Lino Frattin, who after a few days, won Black V's fifth Italian Cup against Cantù. The team was eliminated by Stefanel Milano in the Top 16 of the FIBA EuroLeague, the former Champions Cup. In the national playoffs, Virtus was eliminated in the semi-finals by the other Bologna's team, Teamsystem, which, after years of poor results, was becoming increasingly competitive.

==== 1997–2000: Danilović's comeback and the first EuroLeague ====
In 1997, Roberto Brunamonti became team's general manager, while coach Messina and Sasha Danilović returned to Virtus and the team was completed with important international players like Radoslav Nesterovič, Antoine Rigaudeau, Hugo Sconochini and Alessandro Frosini, as well as with the confirmation of Zoran Savić and Alessandro Abbio. In the same year, the club moved to PalaMalaguti, an indoor sporting arena in Casalecchio di Reno with a seating capacity of more than 8,000 people, leaving PalaDozza after almost 40 years.

On 23 April 1998, Virtus won its first EuroLeague, defeating 58–44 AEK in Barcelona, with Savić elected MVP of the Final Four. While on 31 May, Virtus conquered its 14th national title, defeating in Game 5 of the final, Teamsystem Bologna. At twenty seconds from the end of the game, with Fortitudo leading by 4, Danilović scored a three-point shot and at the same time suffered a foul by Dominique Wilkins, completing the so-called "four-point shot". Then Virtus won the match in the overtime. The 1998 final between Virtus and Fortiudo is widely considered as the greatest one in the history of Italian basketball, with two teams from the same city, which were among the best ones in the continent. During this period, Bologna was nicknamed "Basket City", due to the fame and the victories of town's two teams.

In the following season, Virtus won its 7th Italian Cup in January 1999. The team also defeated Fortitudo 57–62 in a historic EuroLeague's semi-final in Munich, but it lost 82–74 in the final against Žalgiris of Tyus Edney and was eliminated in the semi-finals for the national championship by Treviso. In 1999–2000 season, the Black V lost the Italian Cup final against Treviso and was defeated 83–76 by AEK, in the FIBA Saporta Cup's final in Lausanne. Moreover, Virtus was once again eliminated by Treviso, in the semi-finals for the national championship.

In May 2000, Cazzola sold Virtus to Marco Madrigali, a video game entrepreneur, who became the new president of the club. Under Cazzola's presidency, Virtus lived a period which became known as its "Golden Age", in which the Black V won four national titles, two Italian Cups and a EuroLeague, becoming one of the most notable and successful teams in Europe.

=== 2000–2003: The Madrigali era ===
==== 2000–2002: Ginóbili's rise and the second EuroLeague ====
In the 2000–01 season, Madrigali and Brunamonti signed important players, like Marko Jarić, Manu Ginóbili, Matjaž Smodiš, Rashard Griffith and David Andersen; while at the beginning of the season, Sasha Danilović suddenly announced his retirement from basketball. The absence of a strong leader like Danilović and the subsequent ban for doping of another historic player like Hugo Sconochini, forced every single player of the team to take more responsibility, but at the same time opened spaces to the immature and talented newcomers, free to show their abilities and experience at a high level.

After a tough beginning, the season had a turning point during the Christmas derby against Fortitudo, which was soundly won by the Black V by 99–62. From then, Virtus started an outstanding season, characterized by an unrepeatable group capable of beating every record and becoming one of the strongest European teams of all time and, according to many, the strongest ever. On 28 April 2001, Virtus won its seventh Italian Cup against Pesaro, while on 10 May, the Black V won its second EuroLeague, defeating 3–2 Tau Cerámica, in the first and only series in the history of EuroLeague finals. Manu Ginóbili was elected Finals MVP. On 19 June, Virtus won its 15th national championship, beating Paf Wennington Bologna 3–0, while Ginobili was elected Italian League MVP too. After the double in 1997–98, in 2000–01 season, Virtus completed a so-called Triple Crown (known in Italy as Grande Slam), winning all the trophies that it could won.

In the following season, Virtus won its 8th Italian Cup, but after some defeats Madrigali fired Messina. However, after a field invasion by Virtus supporters before a match against Pallacanestro Trieste, Madrigali was forced to re-hire him. Despite this, the team lost 89–83 the EuroLeague final, which was held in PalaMalaguti, against Panathinaikos of Dejan Bodiroga and Željko Obradović, and was eliminated in the semi-finals for the national championship by Benetton Treviso.

==== 2002–2003: Financial problems and interdiction ====
In 2003, Ginóbili moved to the NBA, where he played for the San Antonio Spurs, and Ettore Messina was hired by Benetton, thus Bogdan Tanjević was appointed new head coach. During the summer, due to contrasts with Madrigali, Brunamonti also left the club, after nearly 20 years spent as player and general manager.

After a soundly defeat in Fabriano, Tanjević was replaced by Valerio Bianchini, who failed in reaching the playoffs for the first time in Virtus history but succeeded in saving the team from relegation. However, suffering from serious financial problems, mainly caused by the failure of Madrigali's video game company CTO SpA, Virtus was excluded from the Serie A in August 2003, after missing payments to players, first of all the young Slovenian Sani Bečirovič.

=== 2003–2013: The Sabatini era ===
The bankruptcy was avoided thanks to the intervention of a local trade fair entrepreneur, Claudio Sabatini, who transacted all the debts of the club, after agreements with creditors and took over the company from Madrigali. Sabatini acquired also the club Progresso Castelmaggiore, from a small town in Bologna's hinterland, which played in Serie A2 and sponsored the new team with FuturVirtus brand, guaranteeing, therefore, the continuity of the glorious name "Virtus" despite the exclusion from the championships.

==== 2003–2005: Promotion to Serie A ====
In 2003–04 season, Sabatini signed important former NBA players like Charles Smith, Vonteego Cummings and Rick Brunson. The team was initially coached by Giampiero Ticchi, who was replaced in November by Alberto Bucci, Black V's historic coach. Despite good premises, FuturVirtus did not reach the promotion in Serie A, losing 3–0 in the final series of playoffs from Aurora Jesi.

During the summer of 2004 the club obtained the re-affiliation to the Italian Basketball Federation and the right to use the name "Virtus Pallacanestro" again. The team was completed, among others, with Corey Brewer, A.J. Guyton and Bennett Davison and was coached by Giordano Consolini, who served as Messina's assistant for years. On 3 June 2005, Virtus returned to the top division, defeating 3–0 the Premiata Montegranaro.

==== 2005–2009: National finals and return to Europe ====
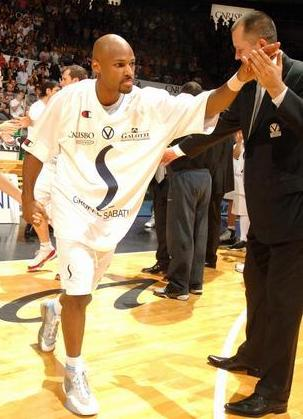
Travis Best and coach Zare Markovski before a game

In the 2005–06 season, Sabatini hired Zare Markovski from North Macedonia as new head coach and signed, among others, David Bluthenthal, Dušan Vukčević and Christian Drejer. Despite a good season's start the team ended 9th, out of the playoffs.

After the end of the season, Bluthenthal, who was Black V's top scorer, went to Fortitudo, while Virtus confirmed Vukčević and Drejer, as well as coach Markovski. Moreover, Sabatini signed Travis Best, a former NBA player for the Indiana Pacers, Brett Blizzard, Guilherme Giovannoni, Vlado Ilievski and Tyrone Grant. The team reached the Italian Cup final, losing against Benetton Treviso and placed second in the regular season, qualifying for the playoffs after a five-year absence. Markovski's team reached the championship finals, but it was defeated 3–0 by Montepaschi Siena. The Black V also reached the EuroCup semi-finals, where it was defeated by the Ukrainian team Azovmash Mariupol.

In the following summer, the team was suddenly reshaped and Markovski was fired by Sabatini, whose presidency was characterized by his fickle nature, which led him implementing unexpected and often unpopular choices. The president hired Stefano Pillastrini as new head coach and signed, among others, Alan Anderson, Delonte Holland, Dewarick Spencer and Roberto Chiacig. Virtus participated in the EuroLeague, but arrived last in the Group A, winning only two games out of 14. In January 2008, Pillastrini was fired and Renato Pasquali became the new coach; after few months Sabatini re-signed Travis Best, who led the team to the second consecutive Italian Cup final, lost against Avellino. However, Virtus ended the season at the 16th place.

In 2008–09 season, the team was completely renewed with prominent players like the former NBA player Earl Boykins, Keith Langford, Sharrod Ford and the re-sign of Dušan Vukčević. After few months, coach Pasquali was succeeded by Matteo Boniciolli. On 21 February, Virtus played its third consecutive Italian Cup final, which once again lost against Siena. On 26 April 2009, Virtus won the European third tier trophy, the EuroChallenge, against Cholet Basket, thanks to 21 points of the Final Four MVP Keith Langford. The team ended the regular season at the 5th place and was eliminated in the first round of national playoffs by Treviso. Boniciolli was immediately fired by president Sabatini and the team was reshaped again during summer.

==== 2009–2013: Transition years ====
In the following season, Sabatini hired Lino Lardo as head coach and appointed Vukčević as team's captain. He also signed, among others, David Moss, Andre Collins, Petteri Koponen and Viktor Sanikidze. Virtus lost its fourth consecutive Italian Cup final and ended the season 5th, being eliminated 3–2 in the first round of the playoffs by Cantù. In 2010–11, the team was completed with Giuseppe Poeta, Valerio Amoroso, Jared Homan, as well as K.C. Rivers from 2011. The Black V ended the regular season 8th and was eliminated in the first round of the playoffs by Siena.

In 2011–2012, the club hired Alessandro Finelli as new coach and signed important players like Chris Douglas-Roberts, a former NBA players, Terrell McIntyre and Angelo Gigli. In late 2011, Sabatini sold Virtus to a foundation of local entrepreneurs, however, he remained as CEO and de facto general manager. At the end of the regular season, the Black V arrived 5th, being eliminated by Dinamo Sassari, in the first round of the playoffs. In the following season, Virtus signed, among others, Steven Smith, Richard Mason Rocca and Jacob Pullen. During the season, Luca Bechi succeeded Finelli as new head coach. The team ended the season at the 14th place.

=== 2013–2016: Struggles and relegation ===
After years of poor successes, Sabatini definitively exited from the club and in 2013, Renato Villalta, a former Virtus star, was appointed president. In 2013–14 season, Virtus signed, among others, Matt Waksh, Willie Warren and Shawn King. In January 2014, Bechi was sacked due to poor results, and Giorgio Valli became the new coach. However, the team arrived 13th, out of the playoffs.

In 2014–15 season, Virtus returned to the playoffs, thanks to an outstanding season of its top-scorers Allan Ray, Jeremy Hazell and Okaro White. However, it was eliminated in the first round by Olimpia Milan.

In the following year Villalta was abruptly removed from his post and Francesco Bertolini was appointed president by the foundation. After a few months, Bertolini was replaced too by Alberto Bucci, the former Virtus coach, who won three national titles with the Black V between 1980s and 1990s. However, the season was characterized by a serious injury to team captain, Allan Ray, and the substitute players signed by the club failed to adequately replace the injured top-player. On 4 May 2016, at the end of the regular season the team ranked 16th and last, therefore it was relegated to Serie A2 for the first time in its history.

=== 2016–present: The Zanetti era ===
==== 2016–2019: Promotion and Champions League ====
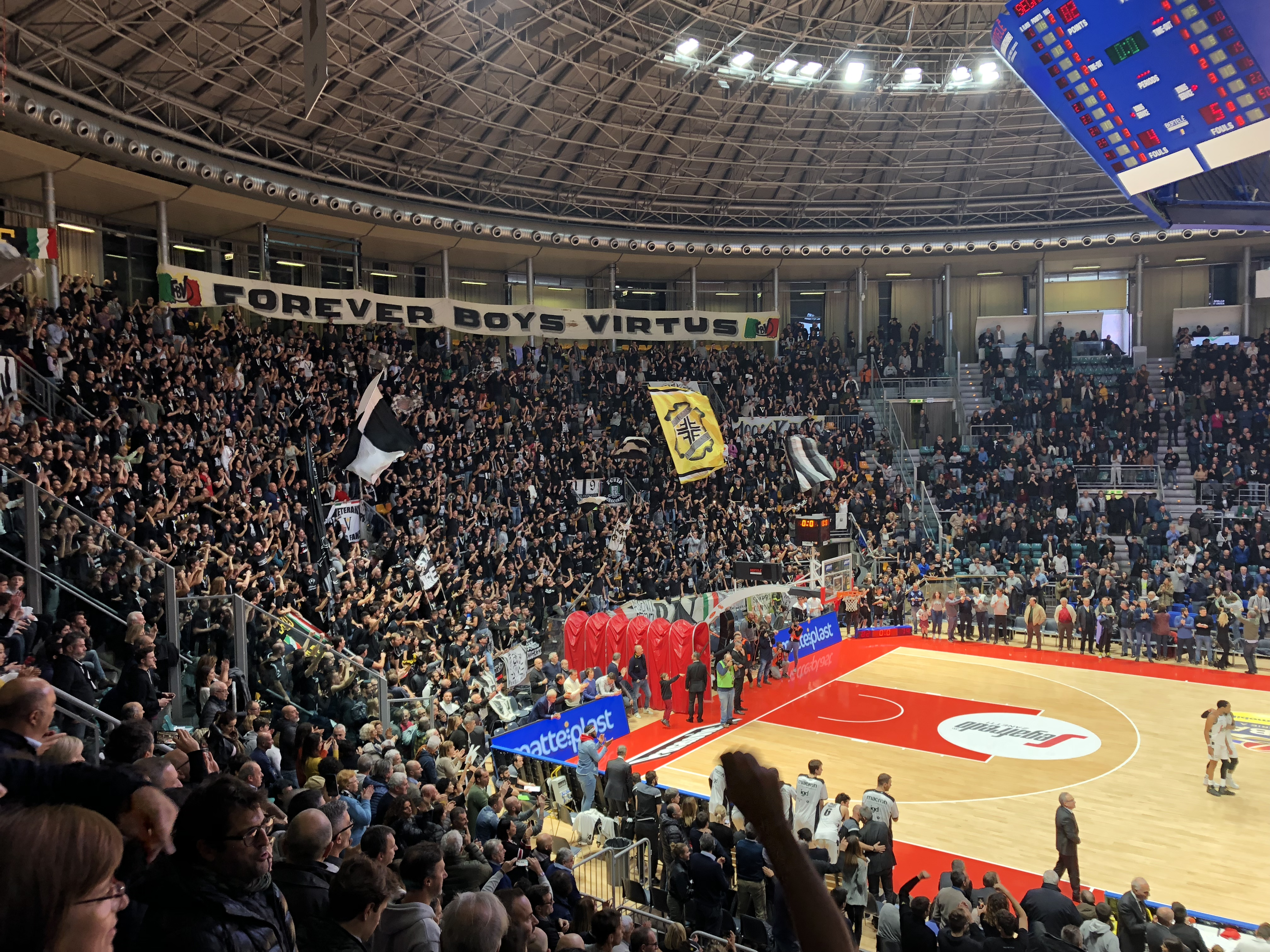
The Virtus fans of "Curva Calori" in PalaDozza, 2018

In the following summer, president Bucci announced Alessandro Ramagli as new head coach of Virtus. The club built a good team for the league, led by important players such as Guido Rosselli, Klaudio Ndoja, Michael Umeh and Kenny Lawson. During the season an important change in ownership occurred: the coffee entrepreneur and former politician, Massimo Zanetti, owner of Segafredo, who was also team's sponsor, became the majority shareholder of the club. Virtus ended second in the regular season behind Treviso and on 19 June 2017, won the playoffs, beating Trieste by 3–0, thus returning to the top series after only one year. During the playoffs, the Black V returned after more than twenty years to Bologna's historic arena, PalaDozza, which became the new official home court in the following season.

In summer 2017, the club signed two of the most prominent Italian players, Pietro Aradori and Alessandro Gentile, as well as two international players like Marcus Slaughter and Oliver Lafayette. Despite good premises, the team was eliminated in the first round of Italian Cup's Final Eight and failed to qualify for the championship playoffs.

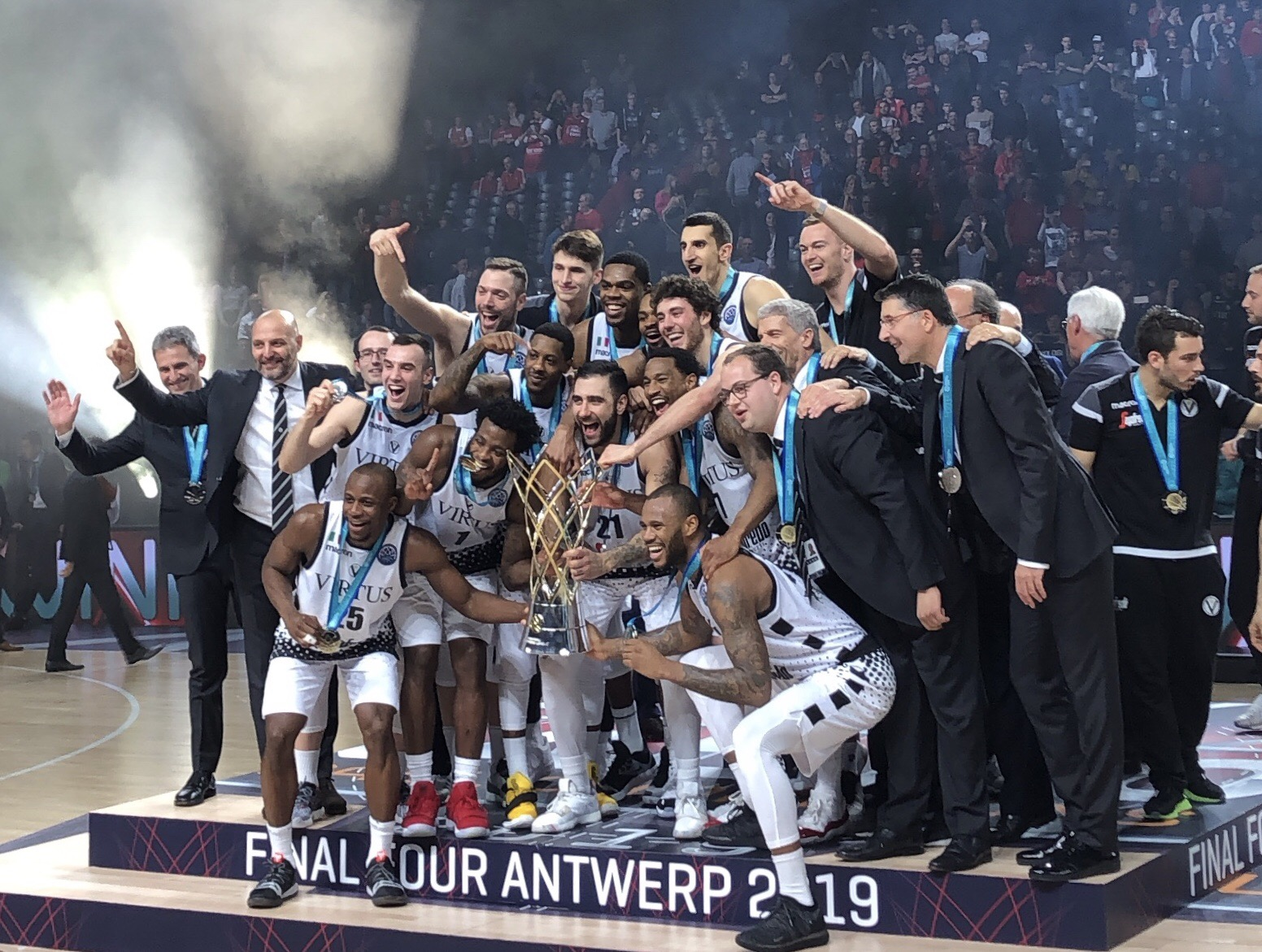
Coach Đorđević and the team, after winning the 2018–19 Basketball Champions League in Antwerp

The 2018–19 season began with the appointment of Alessandro Dalla Salda as new club's CEO and the hire of Stefano Sacripanti as new head coach. Aradori and Filippo Baldi Rossi were confirmed and the club signed, among others, Tony Taylor, Kevin Punter, Amath M'Baye and Brian Qvale, to participate in the Basketball Champions League, which was Virtus's first European competition after ten years. The team reached a record of seven wins in the first seven games of the continental competition, which had never been achieved before. In March 2019, the team signed Mario Chalmers, two-time NBA champion with the Miami Heat. On 9 March, president Alberto Bucci died at 70 years old, due to complications from a cancer. On 11 March, after a defeat against Cantù and with Virtus temporarily out of playoffs, the team board sacked Sacripanti and appointed the Serbian Aleksandar Đorđević as new head coach. On 4 April, the Black V defeated Nanterre 92, reaching the BCL Final Four in Antwerp, which won on 5 May defeating Iberostar Tenerife 73–61, thanks to an outstanding game by Kevin Punter, who was able to score 26 points and was nominated Final Four MVP. The BCL was the fifth European title in team's history and the first one after ten years.

In July 2019, Virtus opened its women's basketball wing, to participate in the Serie A1 championship. In the same month, Giuseppe Sermasi, a local entrepreneur and former vice president, became Virtus new president, holding the vacant post after Bucci's death, while Luca Baraldi, a prominent sports executive and a leading manager of Segafredo, was appointed new CEO.

==== 2019–2023: Teodosić's magic, the 16th title and the EuroCup ====
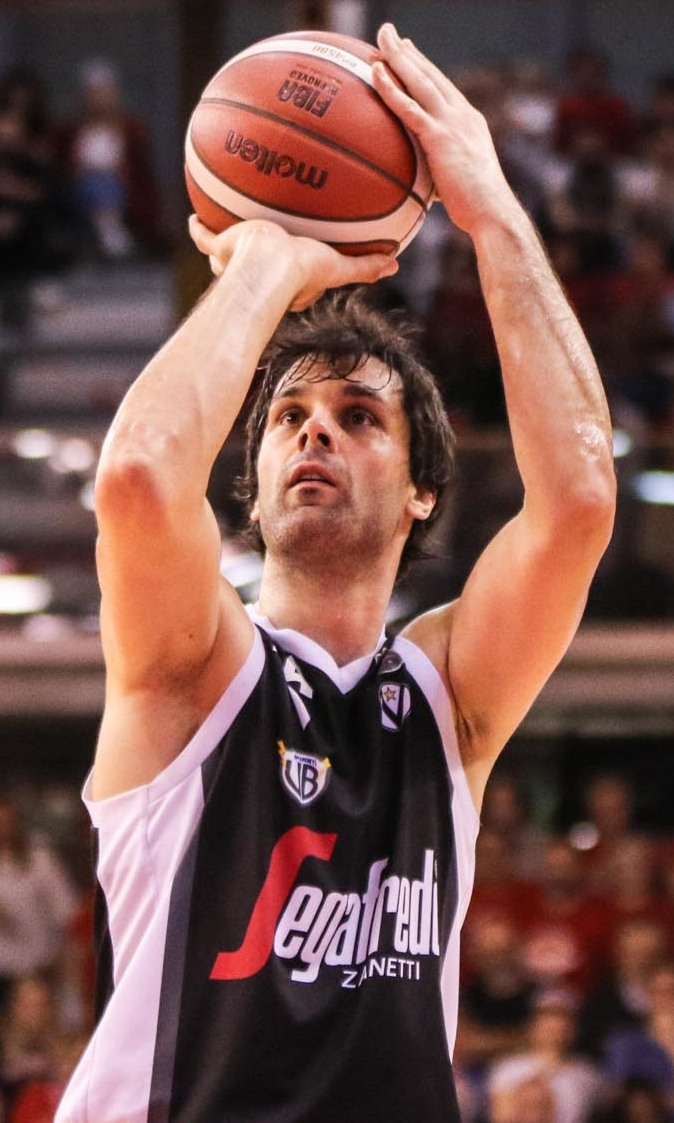
Miloš Teodosić, nicknamed "The Magician" by Virtus fans

On 13 July, Virtus signed a three-year deal with Miloš Teodosić, 2016 EuroLeague champion and former NBA player, who was widely considered one of the best European point guard of all time. In August, the Black V signed Kyle Weems, a small forward from Tofaş, and Stefan Marković, a point guard from BC Khimki who, along with Teodosić, would become the backbone of the team in the following seasons. Among others, the club signed also Vince Hunter, Julian Gamble and Giampaolo Ricci. In the 2019–20 season, Virtus played some home games, including the derby against Fortitudo won 94–62, at the Virtus Segafredo Arena, a temporary indoor arena with a capacity of nearly 10,000 seats, located in the Fiera District.

On 7 April 2020, after more than a month of suspension, the Italian Basketball Federation officially ended the 2019–20 season, due to the COVID-19 pandemic that severely hit Italy. Virtus ended the season first, with 18 wins and only 2 defeats, but the title was not assigned. On 5 May, the EuroLeague's commissioner Jordi Bertomeu announced the cancellation of the EuroCup season too. Virtus, which had achieved the league's playoffs, was confirmed for the following season.

After the early end of the season, the team was largely confirmed for the following championship and, in May and June, the club signed prominent Italian players, like Awudu Abass and Amedeo Tessitori, and homegrown ones, like Amar Alibegović. In September, Virtus hosted the Supercup's Final Four at the Segafredo Arena, but it lost against Olimpia Milan 75–68; the Supercup was the first competition since the cancellation of the previous season. In November 2020, Virtus signed a three-year deal with Marco Belinelli, from the San Antonio Spurs. Belinelli, one of the greatest Italian players of all time and 2014 NBA Champion, started his career with Virtus in the early 2000s. The season was also characterized by the emergence of Alessandro Pajola, the young Italian point guard who became one team's most important players. In April 2021, despite a winning record of 19–2, Virtus was defeated in the EuroCup's semifinals by UNICS Kazan. However, the season ended with a great success. In fact, after having knocked out 3–0 both Basket Treviso in the quarterfinals and New Basket Brindisi in the semifinals, on 11 June Virtus defeated 4–0 its historic rival Olimpia Milano in the national finals, winning its 16th national title and the first one after twenty years. Teodosić was appointed MVP of the finals.

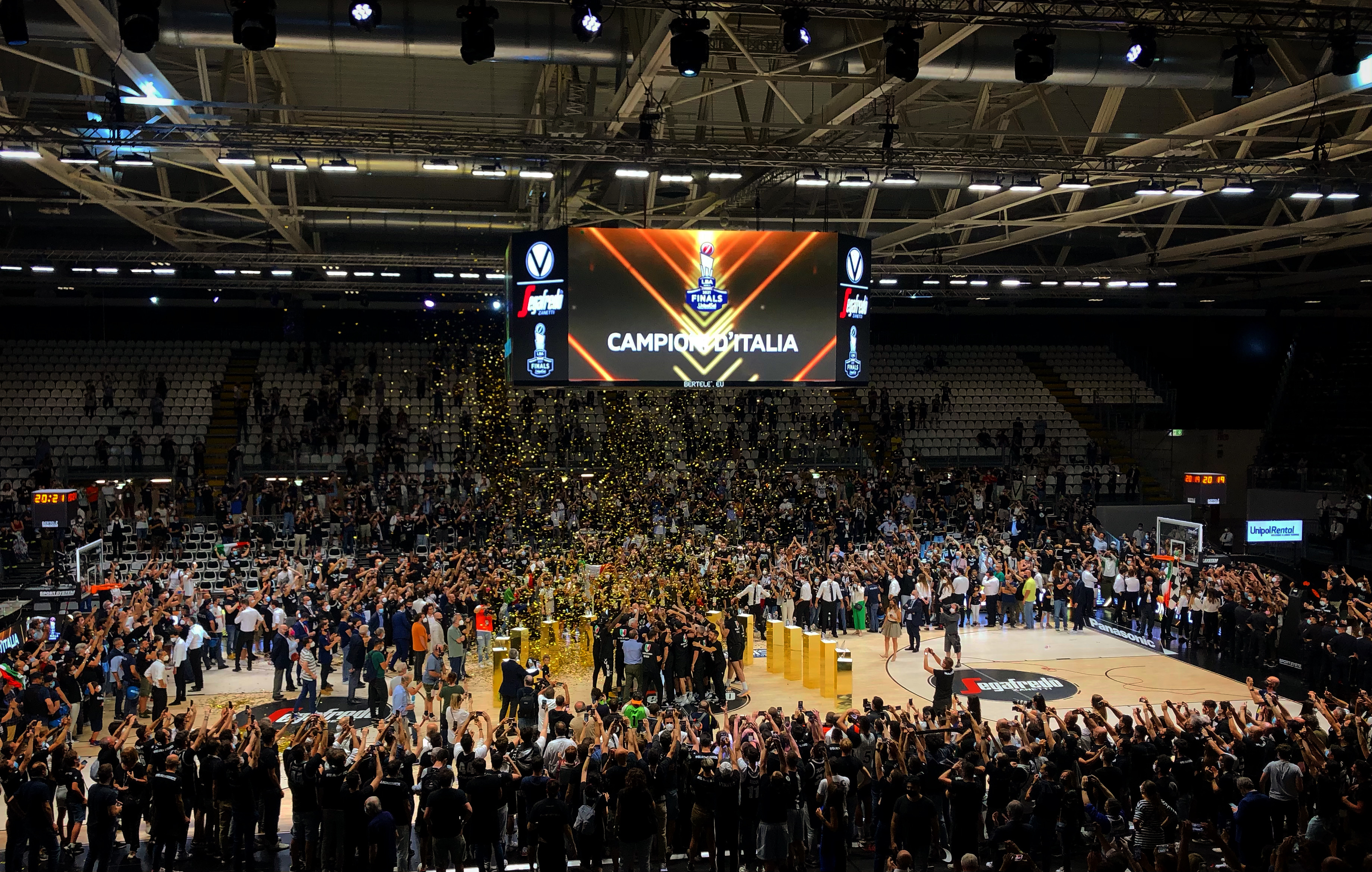
Celebrations at the Segafredo Arena following the winning of the 16th title

On 15 June, after a few days from the victory, Đorđević was not confirmed as head coach at the end of his two-year contract, due to some tensions with the club's ownership occurred during the season. On 18 June, the club hired the new head coach, signing a three-year deal with Sergio Scariolo, from the Toronto Raptors. Moreover, Marković, Hunter, Gamble and Ricci were not renewed, while in July and August 2021 Virtus signed important foreign players like Ekpe Udoh, Kevin Hervey and Mouhammadou Jaiteh, as well as one of the most talented Italian point guards, Nico Mannion, from the Golden State Warriors. On 21 September, the team won its second Supercup, defeating Olimpia Milano 90–84. However, during the same month, Udoh and Abass suffered serious knee injuries and Virtus signed JaKarr Sampson from the Indiana Pacers and Isaïa Cordinier from Nanterre 92 to replace them.

On 28 October 2021, Zanetti was elected president of Virtus, succeeding Giuseppe Sermasi at the head of the club, and became the only shareholder after a €2 million capital increase. In early 2022, the Russian invasion of Ukraine and the subsequent international sanctions against Russia forced all international players to leave the country. On 3 March, Virtus signed the Italian point guard Daniel Hackett, while on 7 March, the club reached an agreement with the Georgian power forward Tornike Shengelia, both of them from CSKA Moscow.

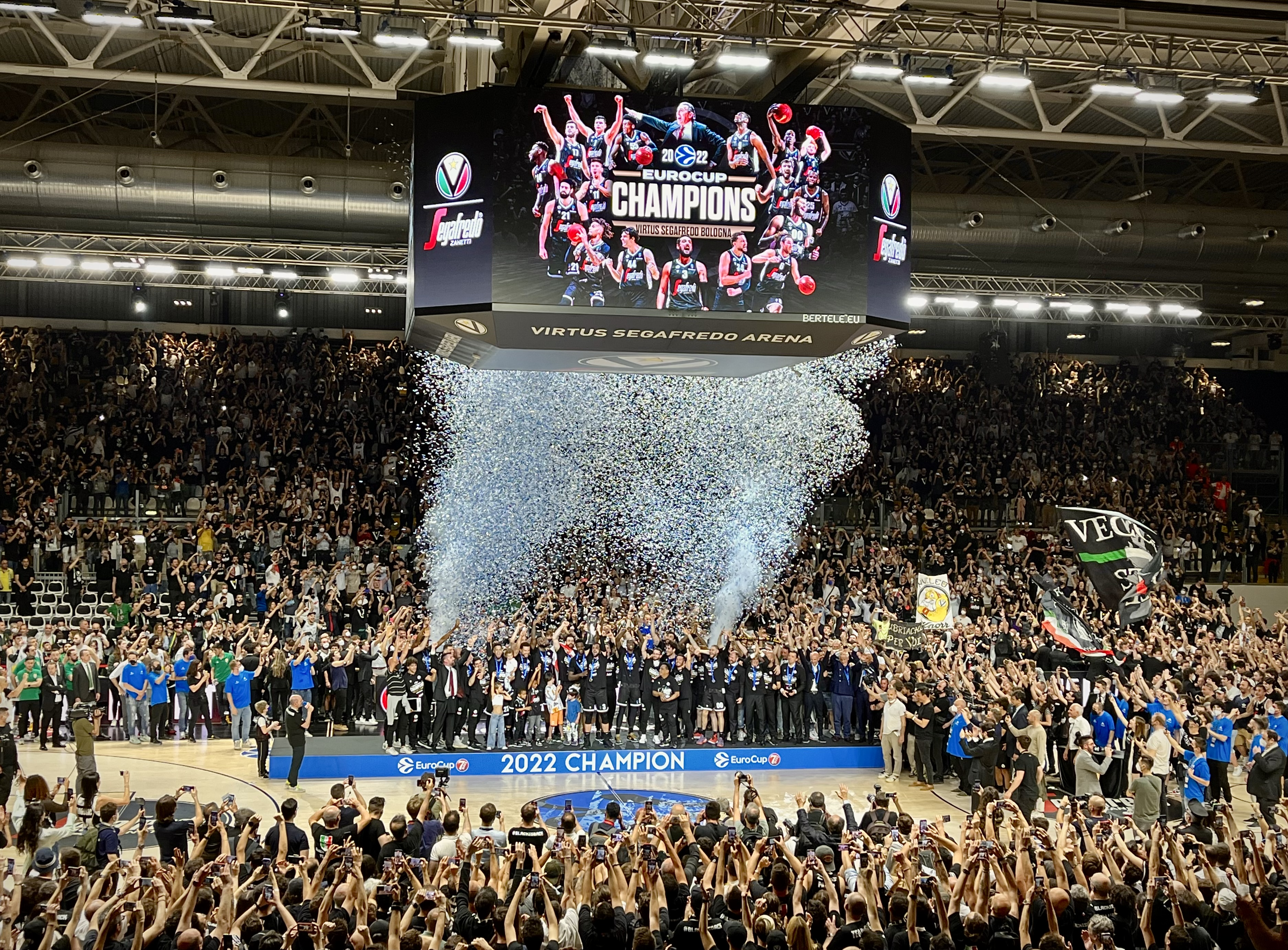
Team and fans celebrating after the victory of the EuroCup on 11 May 2022

Despite a tough EuroCup regular season ended at the fourth place, Virtus ousted Lietkabelis, Ulm and Valencia in the first three rounds of the playoffs and, on 11 May 2022, defeated Frutti Extra Bursaspor by 80–67 at the Segafredo Arena, winning its first EuroCup and qualifying for the EuroLeague after 14 years. With 21 points scored, the Serbian point guard Miloš Teodosić was once again appointed MVP of the final. However, despite having ended the regular season at the first place and having ousted 3–0 both Pesaro and Tortona in the first two rounds of playoffs, Virtus was defeated 4–2 in the national finals by Olimpia Milan.

During the following summer, Udoh, Hervey, Sampson, Alibegović and Tessitori left the club, but Virtus confirmed the backbone of the roster, notably including Shengelia, who was renewed until June 2024. Moreover, the club signed prominent foreign players like Jordan Mickey, Gabriel Lundberg, Semi Ojeleye and Ismaël Bako. On 29 September 2022, after having ousted Milano in the semifinals, Virtus won its third Supercup, defeating 72–69 Banco di Sardegna Sassari and achieving a back-to-back, following the 2021 trophy. However, despite good premises Virtus ended the EuroLeague season at the 14th place, thus it did not qualify for the playoffs. Moreover, the team was defeated in the Italian Basketball Cup final by Brescia. In June, after having ousted 3–0 both Brindisi and Tortona, Virtus was defeated 4–3 by Olimpia Milan in the national finals, following a series which was widely regarded among the best in the latest years of Italian basketball.

On 11 July 2023, Miloš Teodosić did not renew his expired contract with Virtus, amicably parting ways with the Italian club and signing with KK Crvena zvezda, marking the end to four essential seasons, which saw the Black V returning to the top of European basketball after decades. With the Serbian star, often nicknamed "Il Mago" (English: The Magician) by fans, Virtus won its 16th title in 2021, reached the national finals three times in a row, and also won the EuroCup in 2022 and two Supercups.

==== 2023–2025: Shengelia's dominance and the 17th title ====
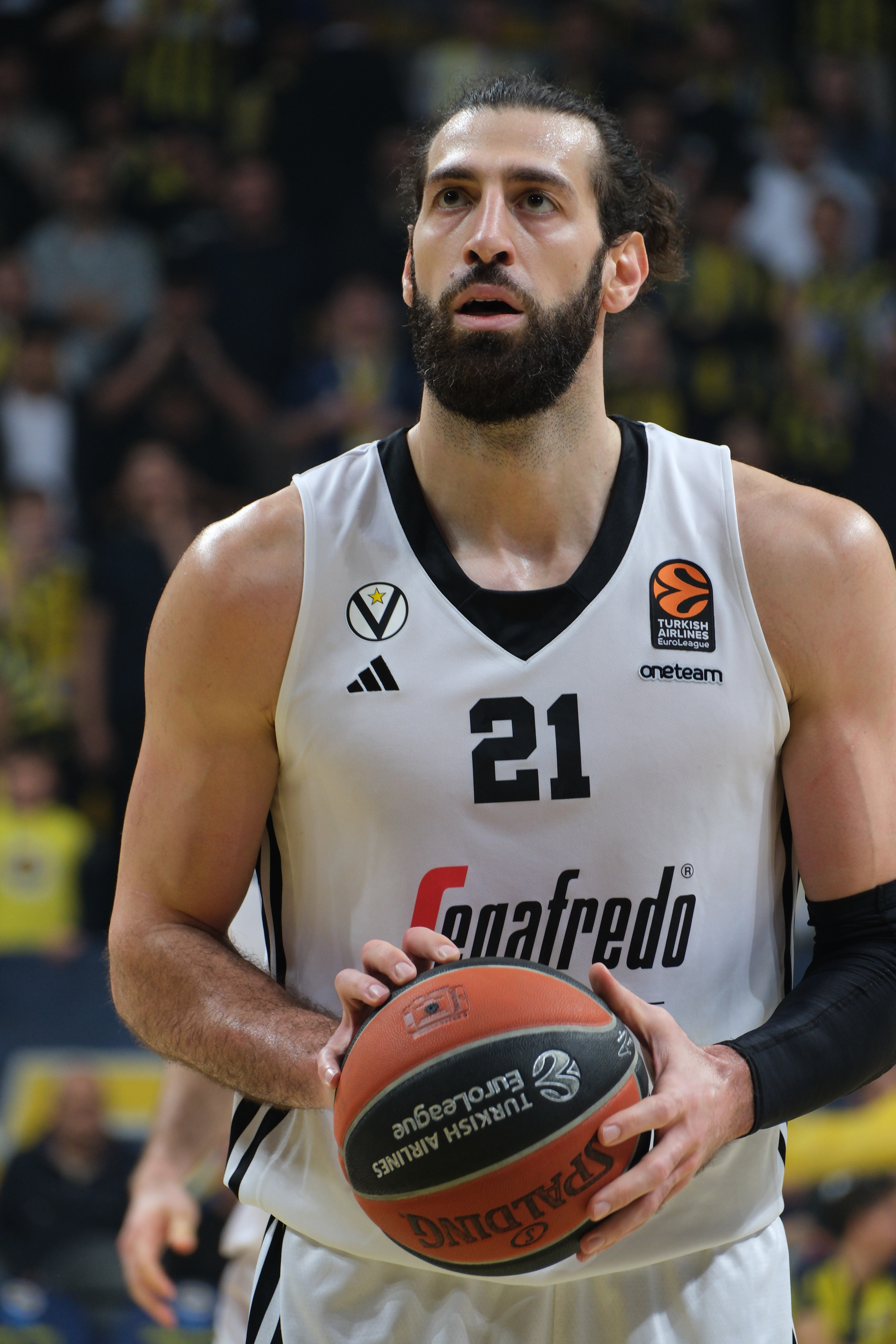
Tornike Shengelia in 2025

In the following summer, the roster deeply changed. In addition to Teodosić, players like Weems, Jaiteh, Mannion and Bako left the club, as Virtus signed the Italian power forward Achille Polonara, as well as the American point guard Jaleen Smith, the Serbian small forward Ognjen Dobrić, and the American centers Bryant Dunston and Devontae Cacok. Moreover, new developments occurred within the club ownership. On 27 June, Carlo Gherardi, owner of CRIF, a global company specialized in business information and analytics, became the minority shareholder of the club, acquiring a participation of 40%.

On 15 September, just a few weeks before the season start, Scariolo was fired following controversial statements regarding the new roster and the upcoming season, and the club hired Luca Banchi as new head coach. On 24 September, after having ousted Milano in the semifinals, Virtus won its fourth Supercup, and the third in a row, defeating 97–60 Germani Brescia. In December, Smith left the club joining KK Partizan and Cacok suffered a serious knee injury, that brought the club to sign the Croatian center Ante Žižić from Anadolu Efes and the Latvian guard Rihards Lomažs from Merkezefendi. Despite an impressive first half of the season, Virtus ended the EuroLeague regular season at the 10th place, with a 17-17 record, qualifying only for the play-in, where after having defeated 67–64 Anadolu Efes, it lost against Baskonia 89–77, not qualifying for the playoffs. Moreover, the Black V placed first during the Italian regular season but, after having knocked out Tortona by 3–2 and Reyer Venezia by 3–1, it lost the third consecutive final against Milan by 3–1.

In the following months, despite losing Lundberg, Dunston, Abass and Mickey, the club confirmed the backbone of the roster and added prominent international players like the small forward Will Clyburn, a former EuroLeague champion and Final Four MVP, and the point guard Matt Morgan, as well as solid Italian players like the center Mouhamet Diouf and the power forward Nicola Akele. In December 2024, Banchi resigned as head coach after a 2–11 start in the EuroLeague, and the club signed Duško Ivanović as his successor. In January 2025, a major change occurred in the club's management, when Zanetti removed his long-time associate Luca Baraldi as CEO of Virtus, ending his 6 years-long tenure. Virtus ended the EuroLeague at the 17th place, following a disappointing regular season. After the national championship season, ended at the first place, the club signed Brandon Taylor, a point guard from Básquet Coruña, capable of turning the season around. Virtus eliminated Venezia 3–2 and their arch-rival Milan 3–1, reaching their fifth finals in a row. They then defeated Brescia 3–0, claiming the Italian championship title for the 17th time. After having dominated the series against both Milan and Brescia, Shengelia was named MVP.

==== 2025–present: Rebuilding ====
Significant changes took place in the following weeks: Belinelli announced his retirement, becoming club's brand ambassador, while Shengelia and Cordinier departed the club after four successful seasons, bringing an end to the core group that had led the club to the 2022 EuroCup triumph and the 2025 national championship. The club then signed the two guards Carsen Edwards and Luca Vildoza, key players around whom it built the new team, also bringing in forwards like Saliou Niang, Derrick Alston Jr. and Karim Jallow, and the center Alen Smailagić. Moreover, in June, Zanetti bought back Carlo Gherardi's shares, regaining full ownership of the club. On 27 March 2026, Virtus parted ways with Ivanović, and his assistant Nenad Jakovljević became the new head coach. Despite finishing first in the regular season, the team was severely affected by injuries to Alston, Pajola, and Vildoza in the playoffs, and was consequently eliminated by Reyer Venezia in the semifinals, missing the national finals for the first time in five years.

On 19 June 2026, the club signed Álex Mumbrú as the new head coach, who became the first Spaniard to coach Virtus since Eduardo Kucharski in 1960–63. With the start of the new season, Virtus underwent a major overhaul of its roster. Several players departed the club, including Edwards, Vildoza and Pajola, who left Virtus after 11 seasons with the team. The club brought in several new players, including point guards Marcus Carr, Trent Frazier and Rasheed Bello, shooting guard Wendell Moore Jr., forwards Kessler Edwards and Bobi Klintman, and center Kevin Kokila. The Italian contingent was also strengthened with the additions of Tommaso Baldasso and Davide Casarin.

== Logos ==
Multi sport club SEF Virtus logo

Used during the 1930s

Used during the 1940s and the 1950s

Used from the 1960s until 1984

Used after the 10th title of 1984

Used from 1996 to 2026

Current logo for the 2027 centenary

== Arena ==
Since its foundation, Virtus Bologna has changed several home arenas. Each of them was more than just a basketball court, rather a real "house" of the Black V, marking, in the period when they were used, a different era of the long club's history:

Arena	Photo	Capacity	Years	Notes
Church of Santa Lucia		c. 1,000	1934–1946	Former Catholic church, nowadays it is the auditorium of the University of Bologna.
Court of Via Ravone		—N/a	1946	Outdoor field used after World War II.
Sala Borsa		1,050	1946–1957	Former city's stock exchange, nowadays it is a library.
PalaDozza		7,500 5,570	1957–1996 2017–present	Known as "Sports Hall" until 1966 and nicknamed Il Madison.
Unipol Arena		8,650 10,000	1996–2017 2024–2025	Known as "PalaMalaguti" until 2008 and "Futurshow Station" until 2011.
Virtus Arena		10,500	2019–2026	Temporary indoor arena located in a fair pavilion within the Fiera District. Known as "Segafredo Arena" until 2025.
Unipol Hall		11,000	2026–present	Multi-purpose indoor arena located within the Fiera District.

== Honours and other Achievements ==
Honours
Type	Competition	Titles	Seasons
International	EuroLeague	2	1997–98, 2000–01*
International	EuroCup	1	2021–22
International	FIBA Saporta Cup	1	1989–90
International	FIBA Champions League	1	2018–19
International	FIBA EuroChallenge	1	2008–09
Domestic	Italian League	17	1945–46, 1946–47, 1947–48, 1948–49, 1954–55, 1955–56, 1975–76, 1978–79, 1979–80, 1983–84, 1992–93, 1993–94, 1994–95, 1997–98, 2000–01, 2020–21, 2024–25
Domestic	Italian Cup	8	1973–74, 1983–84, 1988–89, 1989–90, 1996–97, 1998–99, 2000–01, 2001–02
Domestic	Italian Supercup	4	1995, 2021, 2022, 2023

=== Other achievements ===
==== Trebles ====
- Triple Crown
  - Season (1): 2000–01

==== International competitions ====
- EuroLeague
  - Runners-up (3): 1980–81, 1998–99, 2001–02
  - 4th place (1): 1979–80
  - Final Four (3): 1998, 1999, 2002
- EuroCup
  - Semifinalists (1): 2020–21
- FIBA Saporta Cup (defunct)
  - Runners-up (2): 1977–78, 1999–00
  - Semifinalists (2): 1978–79, 1981–82
- FIBA EuroChallenge (defunct)

3rd place (1): 2006–07

- FIBA Intercontinental Cup

Runners-up (1): 2020

- McDonald's Championship (defunct)

Runners-up (2): 1993, 1995

==== Domestic competitions ====
- Italian League
  - Runners-up (20): 1935, 1936, 1937–38, 1939–40, 1942–43, 1949–50, 1951–52, 1952–53, 1956–57, 1957–58, 1958–59, 1959–60, 1960–61, 1976–77, 1977–78, 1980–81, 2006–07, 2021–22, 2022–23, 2023–24
- Italian Cup
  - Runners-up (7): 1992–93, 1999–00, 2006–07, 2007–08, 2008–09, 2009–10, 2022–23
- Italian Supercup
  - Runners-up (9): 1997, 1998, 1999, 2000, 2002, 2009, 2010, 2020, 2024
- Italian LNP Cup

Winners (1): 2017

- Italian Serie A2

Winners (1): 2016–17

== Season by season ==
Season	Tier	League	Pos.	W–L	Italian Cup	Other competitions		European competitions		
1929–30	2	1st Div.	3rd	1–3						
1930–31	2	2nd Div.	4th	2–1–3						
1932–33	2	2nd Div.	5th	4–9						
1933–34	2	2nd Div.	1st	5–1						
1934–35	1	Nat. Div.	2nd	10–6						
1935–36	1	Nat. Div.	2nd	10–2						
1936–37	1	Nat. Div.	2nd	11–3						
1937–38	1	Serie A	2nd	12–5						
1938–39	1	Serie A	3rd	12–4						
1939–40	1	Serie A	2nd	13–5						
1940–41	1	Serie A	6th	8–10						
1941–42	1	Serie A	3rd	16–1–4						
1942–43	1	Serie A	2nd	17–3						
1945–46	1	Serie A	1st	5–0						
1946–47	1	Serie A	1st	15–1–2						
1947–48	1	Serie A	1st	15–1–4						
1948–49	1	Serie A	1st	18–4						
1949–50	1	Serie A	2nd	20–6						
1950–51	1	Serie A	3rd	16–2–8						
1951–52	1	Serie A	2nd	17–5						
1952–53	1	Serie A	2nd	15–7						
1953–54	1	Serie A	3rd	14–8						
1954–55	1	Serie A	1st	15–2–5						
1955–56	1	Elite	1st	19–3						
1956–57	1	Elite	2nd	18–4						
1957–58	1	Elite	2nd	19–3						
1958–59	1	Elite	2nd	18–4						
1959–60	1	Elite	2nd	19–3						
1960–61	1	Elite	2nd	18–4				1 Champions Cup	SR	3–1
1961–62	1	Elite	3rd	15–7						
1962–63	1	Elite	3rd	21–5						
1963–64	1	Elite	3rd	23–3						
1964–65	1	Elite	3rd	15–7						
1965–66	1	Serie A	4th	15–7						
1966–67	1	Serie A	6th	10–12						
1968–69	1	Serie A	3rd	16–6	Top 16					
1968–69	1	Serie A	10th	9–13	Quarterfinalist					
1969–70	1	Serie A	7th	9–13	Quarterfinalist					
1970–71	1	Serie A	10th	6–18	Top 16					
1971–72	1	Serie A	5th	11–11	Quarterfinalist					
1972–73	1	Serie A	4th	12–14	Quarterfinalist					
1973–74	1	Serie A	5th	15–11	Champion					
1974–75	1	Serie A1	4th	26–14				2 Cup Winners' Cup	QF	2–3
1975–76	1	Serie A1	1st	28–8				3 Korać Cup	SF	6–1
1976–77	1	Serie A1	2nd	25–8				1 Champions Cup	GS	3–3
1977–78	1	Serie A1	2nd	23–11				2 Cup Winners' Cup	2nd	6–5
1978–79	1	Serie A1	1st	23–11				2 Cup Winners' Cup	SF	5–3
1979–80	1	Serie A1	1st	26–8				1 Champions Cup	SF	9–5
1980–81	1	Serie A1	2nd	26–15				1 Champions Cup	2nd	13–4
1981–82	1	Serie A1	4th	24–16				2 Cup Winners' Cup	SF	4–4
1982–83	1	Serie A1	5th	24–11						
1983–84	1	Serie A1	1st	28–10	Champion					
1984–85	1	Serie A1	7th	18–16	Quarterfinalist			1 Champions Cup	SF	5–9
1985–86	1	Serie A1	10th	17–15	Quarterfinalist					
1986–87	1	Serie A1	5th	20–12	Quarterfinalist					
1987–88	1	Serie A1	9th	18–14	Top 16			3 Korać Cup	QF	6–2
1988–89	1	Serie A1	3rd	21–15	Champion					
1989–90	1	Serie A1	5th	22–13	Champion			2 Cup Winner's Cup	C	8–3
1990–91	1	Serie A1	3rd	22–14	Quarterfinalist			2 Cup Winner's Cup	QF	6–2
1991–92	1	Serie A1	4th	24–12	Semifinalist			1 EuroLeague	QF	13–6
1992–93	1	Serie A1	1st	31–6	Runners-up			1 EuroLeague	QF	8–8
1993–94	1	Serie A1	1st	31–9	Semifinalist			1 EuroLeague	QF	10–7
1994–95	1	Serie A1	1st	33–9	Quarterfinalist			1 EuroLeague	QF	11–8
1995–96	1	Serie A1	3rd	26–12	Semifinalist	Supercup	C	1 EuroLeague	GS	8–8
1996–97	1	Serie A1	3rd	20–14	Champion			1 EuroLeague	T16	8–11
1997–98	1	Serie A1	1st	32–7	Semifinalist	Supercup	2nd	1 EuroLeague	C	19–3
1998–99	1	Serie A1	3rd	24–9	Champion	Supercup	2nd	1 EuroLeague	2nd	15–7
1999–00	1	Serie A1	3rd	24–14	Runners-up	Supercup	2nd	2 Saporta Cup	2nd	15–4
2000–01	1	Serie A1	1st	38–5	Champion	Supercup	2nd	1 EuroLeague	C	19–3
2001–02	1	Serie A	3rd	32–11	Champion	Supercup	SF	1 EuroLeague	2nd	17–5
2002–03	1	Serie A	14th (Note: Virtus succeeded in avoiding the relegation, however it was later excluded from Serie A after missing payments to players.)	13–21		Supercup	2nd	1 EuroLeague	T16	6–14
2003–04	2	Serie A2	3rd	25–16				2 ULEB Cup	RS	3–7
2004–05	2	Serie A2	2nd	31–10						
2005–06	1	Serie A	9th	19–15						
2006–07	1	Serie A	2nd	28–18	Runners-up			3 FIBA EuroCup	3rd	12–4
2007–08	1	Serie A	15th	13–21	Runners-up			1 EuroLeague	RS	2–12
2008–09	1	Serie A	5th	19–16	Runners-up			3 EuroChallenge	C	13–3
2009–10	1	Serie A	5th	17–15	Runners-up	Supercup	2nd			
2010–11	1	Serie A	8th	16–18		Supercup	2nd			
2011–12	1	Serie A	5th	20–15						
2012–13	1	Serie A	14th	10–20						
2013–14	1	Serie A	13th	11–19						
2014–15	1	Serie A	8th	15–18						
2015–16	1	Serie A	16th	11–19						
2016–17	2	Serie A2	1st	33–11		LNP Cup	C			
2017–18	1	LBA	9th	15–15	Quarterfinalist					
2018–19	1	LBA	11th	15–15	Semifinalist			Champions League	C	14–5
2019–20	1	LBA	1st (Note: Season cancelled due to COVID-19 pandemic)	18–2	Quarterfinalist	Intercontinental	2nd	2 EuroCup	—	12–4
2020–21	1	LBA	1st	29–9	Quarterfinalist	Supercup	2nd	2 EuroCup	SF	19–2
2021–22	1	LBA	2nd	34–8	Semifinalist	Supercup	C	2 EuroCup	C	15–7
2022–23	1	LBA	2nd	32–11	Runners-up	Supercup	C	1 EuroLeague	14th	14–20
2023–24	1	LBA	2nd	29–14	Quarterfinalist	Supercup	C	1 EuroLeague	10th	18–18
2024–25	1	LBA	1st	31–10	Quarterfinalist	Supercup	2nd	1 EuroLeague	17th	9–25
2025–26	1	LBA	3rd	27–10	Semifinalist	Supercup	SF	1 EuroLeague	17th	14–24
2026–27	1	LBA				Supercup	SF	1 EuroLeague		

== Top performances in European and Worldwide competitions ==
Season	Achievement	Notes
EuroLeague
1979–80	Semifinal group stage	4th place in a group with Maccabi Tel Aviv, Real Madrid, Bosna, Nashua EBBC and Partizan
1980–81	Final	Lost to Maccabi Tel Aviv 79–80 in the final (Strasbourg)
1984–85	Semifinal group stage	6th place in a group with Cibona, Real Madrid, Maccabi Tel Aviv, CSKA Moscow and Banco Roma
1991–92	Quarterfinals	Eliminated 2–1 by Partizan, 65–78 (L) in Belgrade, 61–60 (W) and 65–69 (L) in Bologna
1992–93	Quarterfinals	Eliminated 2–0 by Real Madrid Teka, 56–76 (L) in Bologna and 58–79 (L) in Madrid
1993–94	Quarterfinals	Eliminated 2–1 by Olympiacos, 77–64 (W) in Bologna, 69–89 (L) and 62–65 (L) in Piraeus
1994–95	Quarterfinals	Eliminated 2–1 by Panathinaikos, 85–68 (W) in Bologna, 55–63 (L) and 56–99 (L) in Athens
1997–98	Champions	Defeated Partizan Zepter 83–61 in the semifinal, defeated AEK 58–44 in the final of the Final Four in Barcelona
1998–99	Final	Defeated Teamsystem Bologna 62–57 in the semifinal, lost to Žalgiris 74–82 in the final (Munich)
2000–01	Champions	Defeated 3–2 Tau Cerámica, 65–78 (L) and 94–73 (W) in Bologna, 80–60 (W) and 79–96 (L) in Vitoria-Gasteiz, finally 82–74 (W) in Bologna
2001–02	Final	Defeated Benetton Treviso 90–82 in the semifinal, lost to Panathinaikos 83–89 in the final (Bologna)
EuroCup
2020–21	Semifinals	Eliminated 2–1 by UNICS Kazan, 80–76 (W) in Bologna, 85–81 (L) in Kazan and 100–107 (L) in Bologna
2021–22	Champions	Defeated 80–67 Frutti Extra Bursaspor in the final of EuroCup in Bologna
FIBA Saporta Cup
1974–75	Quarterfinals	3rd place in a group with Spartak Leningrad, Jugoplastika and Moderne
1977–78	Final	Lost to Gabetti Cantù 82–84 in the final (Milan)
1978–79	Semifinals	Eliminated by EBBC, 85–73 (W) in Bologna and 92–105 (L) in Den Bosch after two overtimes
1981–82	Semifinals	Eliminated by Real Madrid, 78–79 (L) in Bologna and 94–107 (L) in Madrid
1989–90	Champions	Defeated Real Madrid 79–74 in the final of European Cup Winner's Cup in Florence
1990–91	Quarterfinals	3rd place in a group with Dynamo Moscow, Pitch Cholet and Ovarense
1999–00	Final	Lost to AEK 76–83 in the final (Lausanne)
Basketball Champions League
2018–19	Champions	Defeated Brose Bamberg 67–50 in the semifinal, defeated Iberostar Tenerife 73–61 in the final of the BCL Final Four in Antwerp
FIBA Korać Cup
1975–76	Semifinals	Eliminated by Jugoplastika, 83–74 (W) in Split and 79–92 (L) in Bologna
EuroChallenge
2006–07	Final Four	3rd place in Girona, lost to Azovmash 73–74 in the semi-final, defeated MMT Estudiantes 80–62 in the 3rd place game
2008–09	Champions	Defeated Proteas EKA AEL 83–69 in the semi-final, defeated Cholet 77–75 in the final of the Eurochallenge Final Four in Bologna
FIBA Intercontinental Cup
2020	Final	Defeated San Lorenzo 75–57 in the semifinal, lost to Iberostar Tenerife 80–72 in the final (Tenerife)
McDonald's Championship
1993	Final	Defeated Limoges CSP 101–85 in the semifinal, lost to Phoenix Suns 90–112 in the final (Munich)
1995	Final	Defeated Real Madrid Teka 102–96 in the semifinal, lost to Houston Rockets 112–126 in the final (London)

== The road to the European cups victories ==
1989–90 FIBA European Cup Winner's Cup

Round	Team	Home	Away
2nd	(Turkey) Çukurova Üniversitesi	108–64	71–72
QF	(Soviet Union) Žalgiris	102–79	86–83
QF	(Belgium) Sunair Oostende	93–85	78–69
QF	(Israel) Maccabi Ramat Gan	86–73	95–96
SF	(Greece) PAOK	77–57	94–100
F	(Spain) Real Madrid	79–74	

1997–98 FIBA EuroLeague

Round	Team	Home	Away
1st	(Israel) Hapoel Jerusalem	73–51	81–68
1st	(France) Pau-Orthez	72–79	67–65
1st	(Spain) FC Barcelona Banca Catalana	83–70	84–71
1st	(Federal Republic of Yugoslavia) Partizan Zepter	77–72	74–49
1st	(Turkey) Ülker	94–64	68–66
2nd	(France) PSG Racing	69–52	72–62
2nd	(Slovenia) Union Olimpija	72–62	60–76
2nd	(Germany) Alba Berlin	81–66	69–85
Top 16	(Spain) Estudiantes	86–62	67–62
QF	(Italy) Teamsystem Bologna	64–52	58–56
SF	(Federal Republic of Yugoslavia) Partizan Zepter	83–61	
F	(Greece) AEK	58–44	

2000–01 EuroLeague

Round	Team	Home	Away
RS	(Greece) AEK	81–66	77–78
RS	(Croatia) Cibona	106–88	78–69
RS	(Spain) Tau Cerámica	76–73	65–59
RS	(Belgium) Spirou Charleroi	106–87	80–58
RS	(Russia) Saint Petersburg Lions	84–78	82–78
Top 16	(Spain) Adecco Estudiantes	113–70	85–80
QF	(Slovenia) Union Olimpija	80–79	81–79
SF	(Italy) Paf Wennington Bologna	103–76	92–84
SF	(Italy) Paf Wennington Bologna	74–70	92–84
F	(Spain) Tau Cerámica	65–78	94–73
F	(Spain) Tau Cerámica	80–60	79–96
F	(Spain) Tau Cerámica	82–74	

2008–09 FIBA EuroChallenge

Round	Team	Home	Away
GS	(Russia) CSK Samara	75–69	72–70
GS	(Belgium) Base Oostende	70–69	76–87
GS	(Estonia) Tartu Rock	95–85	73–75
Top 16	(Ukraine) BC Kyiv	68–64	57–69
Top 16	(Germany) EWE Baskets Oldenburg	81–82	73–64
Top 16	(Turkey) Galatasaray Cafe Crown	93–77	91–104
QF	(Germany) Telekom Baskets Bonn	86–76	91–106
SF	(Cyprus) Proteas EKA AEL	83–69	
F	(France) Cholet Basket	77–75	

2018–19 Basketball Champions League

Round	Team	Home	Away
GS	(Lithuania) Neptūnas	83–78	88–85
GS	(Belgium) Filou Oostende	89–60	77–76
GS	(Slovenia) Petrol Olimpija	87–84	61–92
GS	(Germany) Medi Bayreuth	74–67	83–93
GS	(Turkey) Beşiktaş J.K.	70–71	90–94
GS	(France) SIG Strasbourg	87–81	83–80
GS	(Greece) Promitheas	98–91	85–95
R16	(France) Le Mans Sarthe	81–58	74–74
QF	(France) Nanterre 92	73–58	83–75
SF	(Germany) Brose Bamberg	67–50	
F	(Spain) Iberostar Tenerife	73–61	

2021–22 EuroCup

Round	Team	Home	Away
RS	(Turkey) Frutti Extra Bursaspor	98–94	83–101
RS	(Germany) Ratiopharm Ulm	87–76	84–68
RS	(Montenegro) KK Budućnost	62–68	86–82
RS	(Spain) Valencia	96–97	83–77
RS	(Italy) Umana Reyer Venezia	90–84	72–83
RS	(Slovenia) Cedevita Olimpija	74–86	101–104
RS	(Greece) Promitheas	91–72	61–83
RS	(Spain) CB Gran Canaria	70–68	100–80
RS	(France) JL Bourg	83–82	68–90
R16	(Lithuania) Lietkabelis	75–67	
QF	(Germany) Ratiopharm Ulm	75–67	
SF	(Spain) Valencia	73–83	
F	(Turkey) Frutti Extra Bursaspor	80–67	

== Players ==
=== Current roster ===
Virtus Bologna roster
Players
Coaches

Pos.	No.	Nat.	Name	Ht.	Wt.	Age
PG	0	(United States)	Bello, Rasheed	1.83 m (6 ft 0 in)	83 kg (183 lb)	23 – 21 July 2003
G	1	(Puerto Rico)	Frazier, Trent	1.87 m (6 ft 2 in)	70 kg (154 lb)	28 – 8 September 1998
PG	2	(Canada)	Carr, Marcus	1.88 m (6 ft 2 in)	86 kg (190 lb)	27 – 6 June 1999
F/C	3	(Angola)	Kokila, Kevin	2.03 m (6 ft 8 in)	110 kg (243 lb)	25 – 3 September 2001
G/F	7	(Italy)	Casarin, Davide (injured)	1.96 m (6 ft 5 in)	86 kg (190 lb)	23 – 22 May 2003
G/F	8	(United States)	Moore Jr., Wendell	1.96 m (6 ft 5 in)	98 kg (216 lb)	25 – 18 September 2001
F	9	(United States)	Edwards, Kessler	2.01 m (6 ft 7 in)	92 kg (203 lb)	26 – 9 August 2000
G	11	(Italy)	Baldasso, Tommaso	1.92 m (6 ft 4 in)	80 kg (176 lb)	28 – 29 January 1998
G/F	13	(Italy)	Baiocchi, Matteo (Y)	1.96 m (6 ft 5 in)	91 kg (201 lb)	19 – 2 August 2007
PF	21	(United States)	Alston Jr., Derrick	2.06 m (6 ft 9 in)	86 kg (190 lb)	29 – 17 September 1997
PG	22	(Italy)	Lonati, Achille (Y)	1.95 m (6 ft 5 in)	90 kg (198 lb)	19 – 22 January 2007
G	23	(Italy)	Hackett, Daniel (C)	1.96 m (6 ft 5 in)	97 kg (214 lb)	38 – 19 December 1987
F	24	(Italy)	Ferrari, Francesco	2.04 m (6 ft 8 in)	90 kg (198 lb)	21 – 18 August 2005
C	31	(Mali)	Diarra, Aliou	2.08 m (6 ft 10 in)	95 kg (209 lb)	24 – 31 December 2001
PF	34	(Sweden)	Klintman, Bobi	2.06 m (6 ft 9 in)	102 kg (225 lb)	23 – 6 March 2003
C	35	(Italy)	Diouf, Mouhamet	2.08 m (6 ft 10 in)	108 kg (238 lb)	25 – 10 September 2001
SF	50	(Italy)	Abass, Awudu	1.98 m (6 ft 6 in)	100 kg (220 lb)	33 – 27 January 1993

Head coach

- (Spain) Álex Mumbrú

Assistant coach(es)

- (Italy) Daniele Parente
- (Spain) Jorge Àlvarez Sierra
- (Italy) Cristian Fedrigo
- (Italy) Roberto Bellini
- (Italy) Samuele Mongardi

Athletic trainer(s)

- (Italy) Emanuele Tibiletti

Legend

- (C) Team captain
- Injured

- Roster
Updated: November 20, 2026

Note: Flags indicate national team eligibility at FIBA-sanctioned events. Players may hold other non-FIBA nationalities not displayed.

=== Depth chart ===
Pos.	Starting 5	Bench 1	Bench 2	Bench 3	Inactive
C	Mouhamet Diouf †	Aliou Diarra ^
PF	Kevin Kokila °	Bobi Klintman °	Derrick Alston Jr. *	Francesco Ferrari †
SF	Kessler Edwards *	Wendell Moore Jr. *		Awudu Abass †	Davide Casarin † (injured)
SG	Trent Frazier *	Daniel Hackett †		Matteo Baiocchi ‡
PG	Marcus Carr *	Rasheed Bello *	Tommaso Baldasso †	Achille Lonati ‡

Notes: LBA clubs can choose between two main roster composition and foreign player formulas:

- 5+5 Formula: 5 Italian players and 5 foreign players.
- 3+4+5 Formula: 5 Italian players, 3 non-EU (European Union) foreigners, and 4 EU foreigners (including countries from the Cotonou Agreement).

Blue † – Homegrown player; (Note: A homegrown player (known in Italy as an atleta di formazione italiana) is defined by where they received their basketball training, rather than their actual passport or nationality. To be officially classified as a homegrown player by the Italian Basketball Federation (FIP), an athlete must complete at least four seasons in an Italian club’s youth academy (between the ages of 14 and 21), appearing in a minimum of 14 games per season. In EuroLeague, the team did not have any limitations regarding the number of Homegrown players.) Red * – Non-EU foreign player; (Note: A non-EU foreigner is a player from a country with no special trade or labor agreement with the European Union. In professional basketball, this primarily applies to players from the United States, Canada, Australia, and parts of Asia or non-EU Europe who do not possess a secondary European passport.) Purple °; – EU Foreign player (Note: "EU Foreign" players: An EU foreign player is a player who holds citizenship in a European Union (EU) member state (or an associated territory) but is not a citizen of the country where the league is based. Minimum of 4 EU Foreign players must be included on the active roster using the 3+4+5 formula) Gold ^; – Cotonou Agreement player (Note: "Cotonou Agreement" players: A Cotonou Agreement player (often called a "Cotonou player") is a basketball player who holds a passport from one of the 79 African, Caribbean, or Pacific (ACP) nations that signed the Cotonou Agreement with the European Union. In the LBA, these athletes are treated exactly like EU citizens and do not count against strict non-EU import quotas. The Cotonou Agreement is a political and trade treaty originally signed in 2000. Following a legal precedent known as the Kolpak ruling, European courts determined that citizens of countries with trade agreements guaranteeing non-discrimination against workers must have the same right to free movement of labor as EU citizens. Because of this ruling, if an LBA club chooses the 3+4+5 team-building formula, Cotonou players can be signed to fill the 4 EU foreigner roster spots, leaving the team’s 3 non-EU spots completely open for American or other traditional import players.) Green ‡ – youth player (Note: "Youth" players: players who are under the age of 20. In the context of European basketball and the LBA, youth players act as a bridge for clubs to fill out their active game-day rosters while meeting domestic requirements. To satisfy the "Italian player" requirement in the 5+5 or 3+4+5 formulas, a player does not technically have to be born in Italy. They can qualify as "homegrown" (Italian-trained) if they spent at least three consecutive seasons in an Italian club's youth academy between the ages of 15 and 21.)

== Notable players ==
=== Retired numbers ===
Virtus Bologna retired numbers
No	Nat.	Player	Position	Tenure	Year Retired
4	(Italy)	Roberto Brunamonti	PG	1982–1996	1997
5	(Serbia)	Predrag Danilović	SG/SF	1992–1995; 1997–2000	2014
10	(Italy)	Renato Villalta	PF/C	1976–1989	2005

=== Naismith Memorial Basketball Hall of Famers ===
- Krešimir Ćosić, C, 1978–1980, Inducted 1996
- Manu Ginóbili, SG, 2000–2002, Inducted 2022

=== FIBA Hall of Famers ===
- Krešimir Ćosić, C, 1978–1980, Inducted 2007
- Aleksandar Nikolić, Head coach, 1981–1982, Inducted 2007
- Antoine Rigaudeau, PG, 1997–2003, Inducted 2015
- Bogdan Tanjević, Head coach, 2002, Inducted 2019
- Jure Zdovc, PG, 1991–1992, Inducted 2021
- Ettore Messina, Head coach, 1989–1993 and 1997–2002, Inducted 2021

=== Other notable players ===
Note: Flags indicate national team eligibility at FIBA-sanctioned events. Players may hold other non-FIBA nationalities not displayed.

Criteria

To appear in this section a player must have either:

- Set a club record or won an individual award while at the club
- Played at least one official international match for their national team at any time
- Played at least one official NBA match at any time.

- (Italy) Awudu Abass
- (Italy) Alessandro Abbio
- (Italy) Mario Alesini
- (Italy) Pietro Aradori
- (Italy) Filippo Baldi Rossi
- (Italy) Marco Belinelli
- (Italy) Gianni Bertolotti
- (Italy) Gianfranco Bersani
- (Italy) Augusto Binelli
- (Italy) Marco Bonamico
- (Italy) Mario Boni
- (Italy) Davide Bonora
- (Italy) Roberto Brunamonti
- (Italy) Carlo Caglieris
- (Italy) Antonio Calebotta
- (Italy) Achille Canna
- (Italy) Roberto Chiacig
- (Italy) Claudio Coldebella
- (Italy) Galeazzo Dondi
- (Italy) Sergio Ferriani
- (Italy) Alessandro Frosini
- (Italy) Vittorio Gallinari
- (Italy) Pietro Generali
- (Italy) Alessandro Gentile
- (Italy) Angelo Gigli
- (Italy) Daniel Hackett
- (Italy) Gianfranco Lombardi
- (Italy) Walter Magnifico
- (Italy) Nico Mannion
- (Italy) Giancarlo Marinelli
- (Italy) Paolo Moretti
- (Italy) Alessandro Pajola
- (Italy) Giuseppe Poeta
- (Italy) Renzo Ranuzzi
- (Italy) Luigi Rapini
- (Italy) Giampaolo Ricci
- (Italy) Luigi Serafini
- (Italy) Mike Sylvester
- (Italy) Amedeo Tessitori
- (Italy) Vittorio Tracuzzi
- (Italy) Renato Villalta
- (Italy) Luca Vitali
- (Italy) Michele Vitali
- (Italy) Dino Zucchi
- (Albania) Klaudio Ndoja
- (Argentina) Manu Ginóbili
- (Argentina) Andrés Pelussi
- (Argentina) Hugo Sconochini
- (Australia) David Andersen
- (The Bahamas) Elvis Rolle
- (Brazil) Guilherme Giovannoni
- (Canada) Marcus Carr
- (Canada) Carl English
- (Canada) Bill Wennington
- (Croatia) Krešimir Ćosić
- (Croatia) Arijan Komazec
- (Croatia) Jaleen Smith
- (Croatia) Ante Žižić
- (Denmark) Christian Drejer
- (Denmark) Gabriel Lundberg
- (Finland) Petteri Koponen
- (France) Isaïa Cordinier
- (France) Mouhammadou Jaiteh
- (France) Amath M'Baye
- (France) Antoine Rigaudeau
- (Georgia (country)) Viktor Sanikidze
- (Georgia (country)) Tornike Shengelia
- (Germany) Karim Jallow
- (Greece) Nikos Oikonomou
- (Greece) Kostas Patavoukas
- (Israel) David Blu
- (Lithuania) Saulius Štombergas
- (Lithuania) Deividas Gailius
- (North Macedonia) Vlado Ilievski
- (Montenegro) Mladen Šekularac
- (Nigeria) Michael Olowokandi
- (Nigeria) Semi Ojeleye
- (Nigeria) Ekpe Udoh
- (Puerto Rico) Trent Frazier
- (Serbia) Predrag Danilović
- (Serbia) Ognjen Dobrić
- (Serbia) Marko Jarić
- (Serbia) Nikola Jestratijević
- (Serbia) Dejan Koturović
- (Serbia) Stefan Marković
- (Serbia) Žarko Paspalj
- (Serbia) Zoran Savić
- (Serbia) Alen Smailagić
- (Serbia) Branislav Prelević
- (Serbia) Miloš Teodosić
- (Serbia) Dušan Vukčević
- (Slovenia) Sani Bečirovič
- (Slovenia) Marko Milić
- (Slovenia) Rasho Nesterović
- (Slovenia) Matjaž Smodiš
- (Slovenia) Jure Zdovc
- (Sweden) Bobi Klintman
- (United States) Derrick Alston Jr.
- (United States) Alan Anderson
- (United States) Charlie Bell
- (United States) Rasheed Bello
- (United States) Travis Best
- (United States) Joe Binion
- (United States) Anthony Bonner
- (United States) Earl Boykins
- (United States) Jan van Breda Kolff
- (United States) Corey Brewer
- (United States) Devontae Cacok
- (United States) Mario Chalmers
- (United States) Terry Driscoll
- (United States) Carsen Edwards
- (United States) Kessler Edwards
- (United States) Rashard Griffith
- (United States) Clemon Johnson
- (United States) Keith Langford
- (United States) Cliff Levingston
- (United States) Kyle Macy
- (United States) Joe Meriweather
- (United States) Tom McMillen
- (United States) Jim McMillian
- (United States) Kevin Punter
- (United States) Micheal Ray Richardson
- (United States) John Roche
- (United States) Charles Smith
- (United States) Greg Stokes
- (United States) Kyle Weems
- (United States) Okaro White
- (United States) Orlando Woolridge

=== Players at the NBA draft ===
^{#}	Denotes player who has never appeared in an NBA regular-season or playoff game

Position	Player	Year	Round	Pick	Drafted by
C	(Italy) Augusto Binelli^{#}	1986	2nd round	40th	Atlanta Hawks
C	(Slovenia) Radoslav Nesterović	1998	1st round	17th	Minnesota Timberwolves
PF/C	(Australia) David Andersen	2002	2nd round	37th	Atlanta Hawks
PG/SG	(Slovenia) Sani Bečirovič^{#}	2003	2nd round	46th	Denver Nuggets

== Head coaches ==
- (Italy) Renzo Poluzzi (1948–1951)
- (Italy) Dino Fontana (1950–1951)
- (Italy) Venzo Vannini (1951–1952)
- (United States) Larry Strong (1952–1953)
- (Italy) Giancarlo Marinelli (1953–1954)
- (Italy) Vittorio Tracuzzi (1954–1960)
- (Spain) Eduardo Kucharski (1960–1963)
- (Italy) Mario Alesini (1963–1966)
- (Czechoslovakia) Jaroslav Šíp (1966–1968)
- (Italy) Renzo Ranuzzi (1968–1969)
- (Italy) Nello Paratore (1969–1970)
- (Italy) Vittorio Tracuzzi (1970–1971)
- (Italy) Nico Messina (1971–1973)
- (United States) Dan Peterson (1973–1978)
- (United States) Terry Driscoll (1978–1980)
- (Italy) Ettore Zuccheri (1980–1981)
- (Italy) Renzo Ranuzzi (1981)
- (Socialist Federal Republic of Yugoslavia) Aleksandar Nikolić (1981–1982)
- (United States) George Bisacca (1982)
- (Italy) Mauro Di Vincenzo (1982–1983)
- (Italy) Alberto Bucci (1983–1985)
- (Italy) Alessandro Gamba (1985–1987)
- (Socialist Federal Republic of Yugoslavia) Krešimir Ćosić (1987–1988)
- (United States) Bob Hill (1988–1989)
- (Italy) Ettore Messina (1989–1993)
- (Italy) Alberto Bucci (1993–1997)
- (Italy) Lino Frattin (1997)
- (Italy) Ettore Messina (1997–2002)
- (Bosnia and Herzegovina) Bogdan Tanjević (2002)
- (Italy) Valerio Bianchini (2002–2003)
- (Italy) Giampiero Ticchi (2003)
- (Italy) Alberto Bucci (2003–2004)
- (Italy) Giordano Consolini (2004–2005)
- (North Macedonia) Zare Markovski (2005–2007)
- (Italy) Stefano Pillastrini (2007–2008)
- (Italy) Renato Pasquali (2008)
- (Italy) Matteo Boniciolli (2008–2009)
- (Italy) Lino Lardo (2009–2011)
- (Italy) Alessandro Finelli (2011–2013)
- (Italy) Luca Bechi (2013–2014)
- (Italy) Giorgio Valli (2014–2016)
- (Italy) Alessandro Ramagli (2016–2018)
- (Italy) Stefano Sacripanti (2018–2019)
- (Serbia) Aleksandar Đorđević (2019–2021)
- (Italy) Sergio Scariolo (2021–2023)
- (Italy) Luca Banchi (2023–2024)
- (Montenegro) Duško Ivanović (2024–2026)
- (Serbia) Nenad Jakovljević (2026)
- (Spain) Álex Mumbrú (2026–present)

== Sponsorship names ==
Throughout the years, due to sponsorship, the club has been known as :

- Minganti Bologna (1953–1958)
- Oransoda Bologna (1958–1960)
- Idrolitina Bologna (1960–1961)
- Virtus Bologna (1961–1962)
- Knorr Bologna (1962–1965)
- Candy Bologna (1965–1969)
- Virtus Bologna (1969–1970)
- Norda Bologna (1970–1974)
- Sinudyne Bologna (1974–1983)
- Granarolo Bologna (1983–1986)
- Dietor Bologna (1986–1988)
- Knorr Bologna (1988–1993)
- Buckler Beer Bologna (1993–1996)
- Kinder Bologna (1996–2002)
- Virtus Bologna (2002–2003)
- Carisbo Bologna (2003–2004)
- Caffè Maxim Bologna (2004–2005)
- VidiVici Bologna (2005–2007)
- La Fortezza Bologna (2007–2009)
- Canadian Solar Bologna (2009–2012)
- SAIE3 Bologna (2012–2013)
- Oknoplast Bologna (2013)
- Granarolo Bologna (2013–2015)
- Obiettivo Lavoro Bologna (2015–2016)
- Virtus Segafredo Bologna (2016–2025)
- Virtus Olidata Bologna (2025–2026) (Note: For Lega Basket Serie A only)
- Virtus Costa Bologna (2026–present)

== Kit manufacturer ==
- 1977–1983: Lotto
- 1983–1988: Les Copains
- 1988–1996: Reebok
- 1996–1999: Fila
- 1999–2009: Champion
- 2009–2024: Macron
- 2024–present: Adidas
