= Zare Markovski =

Skopjan Basketball player and coach

Personal information
- Born: October 28, 1960 (age 66) Skopje, FPR Yugoslavia
- Coaching career: 1983–present

Career history

Playing
- MZT Skopje
- KK Rabotnički

Coaching
- 1988–1991: KK Rabotnički
- 1991–1994: Dinamo Sassari
- 1994–1995: Pallacanestro Reggiana
- 1997–1999: Macedonia
- 1997–1998: Orka Tikveš
- 1998–2000: Darüşşafaka S.K.
- 2000–2002: Lugano Tigers
- 2002–2005: S.S. Felice Scandone
- 2005–2007: Virtus Bologna
- 2007: Olimpia Milano
- 2008–2010: S.S. Felice Scandone
- 2010–2011: Limoges CSP
- 2011–2012: Biancoblù Basket Bologna
- 2012–2013: Victoria Libertas
- 2013–2014: Venezia
- 2014–2015: Juvecaserta Basket
- 2016–2017: Scafati Basket
- 2017–2018: Trabzonspor B.K.
- 2017–2018: Romania
- 2018: Dinamo Sassari
- 2018: Dinamo Sassari (assistant)
- 2024: Pistoia Basket 2000

Zare Markovski was born October 28, 1960, in Skopje) is a Macedonian former professional basketball player and head coach.

== Career ==
Zare Markovski as player played in KK Rabotnički and MZT Skopje. His career as a player was short. At the age of 23 he started working with the youth in KK Rabotnički. Later in 1988 he was named as head coach of the same team.

== Clubs ==
=== Playing career ===
- MZT Skopje
- KK Rabotnički

== Honours ==
=== National domestic league championships ===
- 1990-91: Rabotnicki Skopje: Yugoslav League, Promotion
- 1999–00: Lugano Tigers: Switzerland League, Winner
- 2000-01 Lugano Tigers : Euroleague, Member
- 2000–01: Lugano Tigers: Switzerland League, Winner
- 2001–02: Lugano Tigers: Switzerland League, Winner
- 2006-07: Virtus Bologna : Italian League, Runner-Up
- 2008-09: S.S. Felice Scandone: Euroleague, Member

=== National domestic cup championships ===
- 2001-02: Lugano Tigers: Switzerland Cup, Winner
- 2002-03: Lugano Tigers: Switzerland Cup, Winner
- 1997-98: Orka: Macedonian Cup, Runner-Up
- 2006-07: Virtus Bologna: Italian Cup, Runner-Up
- 2010-11: Limoges CSP: French Cup, Runner-Up
