= Elvis Rolle =

Bahamian basketball player

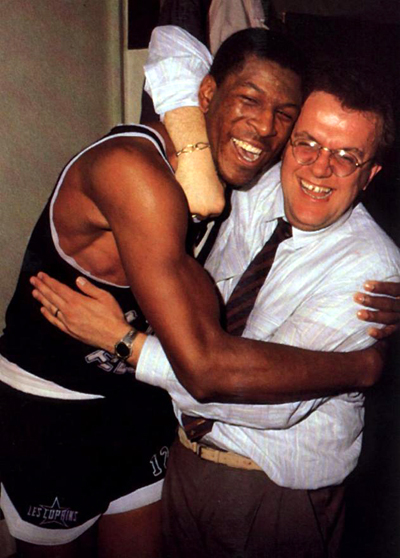
- Rolle (left) with coach Alberto Bucci in 1984

Personal information
- Born: February 8, 1958 (age 68) Cat Island, The Bahamas
- Listed height: 6 ft 10 in (2.08 m)
- Listed weight: 225 lb (102 kg)

Career information
- High school: Fort Pierce Central (Fort Pierce, Florida)
- College: Oral Roberts (1976–1978); Florida State (1979–1981)
- NBA draft: 1981: 2nd round, 42nd overall pick
- Drafted by: Los Angeles Lakers
- Playing career: 1981–1994
- Position: Power forward / center

Career history
- 1981–1985: Virtus Bologna
- 1985–1988: Pallacanestro Livorno
- 1988–1989: AS Monaco
- 1989–1992: Pallacanestro Livorno
- 1992–1993: Virtus Roma
- 1994: Pallacanestro Trapani

Career highlights
- Italian Champion (1984); Italian Cup (1984); Second-team All-Metro Conference (1981)
- Stats at Basketball Reference

Elvis Rolle (born February 8, 1958) is a Bahamian former professional basketball player.

Rolle was born in the Bahamas and moved to Florida, United States, in 1969 to live with an uncle. He attended Fort Pierce Central High School in Fort Pierce, Florida.

Rolle played college basketball for the Oral Roberts Golden Eagles for two seasons before he transferred to play for the Florida State Seminoles during his final two years of eligibility, where he was named a second-team All-Metro selection during his senior season. He was selected by the Los Angeles Lakers as the 42nd overall pick of the 1981 NBA draft but did not play in the National Basketball Association (NBA).

Rolle spent the majority of his thirteen-year career in Italy with the exception of one season in France playing for AS Monaco in 1988–89. With Virtus Bologna, Rolle won an Italian championship title and an Italian Cup in 1984.

== Career statistics ==
Legend
GP	Games played	GS	Games started	MPG	Minutes per game
FG%	Field goal percentage	3P%	3-point field goal percentage	FT%	Free throw percentage
RPG	Rebounds per game	APG	Assists per game	SPG	Steals per game
BPG	Blocks per game	PPG	Points per game	**Bold**	Career high

=== College ===
Year	Team	GP	GS	MPG	FG%	3P%	FT%	RPG	APG	SPG	BPG	PPG
1976–77	Oral Roberts	26	–	–	.500	–	.435	2.0	.3	–	.4	2.3
1977–78	Oral Roberts	27	–	–	.428	–	**.694**	6.4	.2	–	.3	6.6
1979–80	Florida State	**31**	–	**32.2**	**.612**	–	.577	7.9	**.8**	**.5**	1.4	15.4
1980–81	Florida State	28	–	32.1	.566	–	.569	**9.2**	.4	**.5**	**1.7**	**16.0**
Career		112	–	32.2	.553	–	.583	6.5	.4	.5	1.0	10.4
