= Alberto Bucci =

Italian basketball coach (1948–2019)

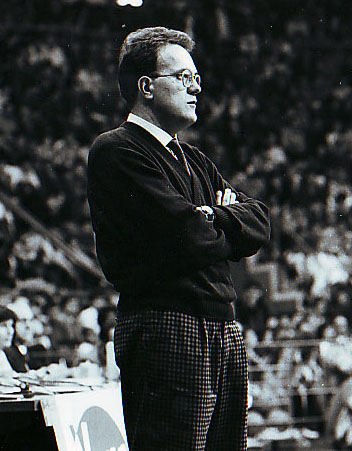

Personal information
- Born: 25 April 1948 Bologna, Italy
- Died: 9 March 2019 (aged 70) Rimini, Italy
- Coaching career: 1974–2004

Career history

Coaching
- 1974–1974: Fortitudo Bologna
- 1974–1979: Basket Rimini
- 1979–1983: Fabriano Basket
- 1983–1985: Virtus Bologna
- 1985–1989: Libertas Livorno
- 1989–1991: Scaligera Verona
- 1991–1993: V.L. Pesaro
- 1993–1997: Virtus Bologna
- 1999–2000: Fabriano Basket
- 2003–2004: Virtus Bologna

Career highlights
- 3× Italian League champion (1984, 1993, 1995); 4× Italian Cup winner (1984, 1991, 1992, 1997); Italian Supercup winner (1995)

Alberto Bucci (25 May 1948 – 9 March 2019) was an Italian professional basketball coach who served as president of Virtus Bologna from 2016 to 2019. Having won three Italian championships and four Italian Cups, Bucci was widely considered one of the greatest Italian coaches of all time.

== Career ==
Alberto Bucci began his coaching career at just 25 years (1974) as head coach of Alco Bologna in the place of outgoing Giuseppe Guerrieri.

The following season found him at Rimini where he stayed for five seasons (1974–79) and led the team from D division to Serie A2. After saving the club from the drop, he joined Fabriano.

In the 1981-82 season he helped the team to reach the top division (Serie A), while the following year he saved them from relegation. His successful job in Fabriano was recognized by Virtus Bologna who gave him charge of the club for the next two years (1983–85). At Bologna, he immediately led the Granarolo to their first golden star with the winning of the double (Italian League & Italian Cup) against the super competitive team of Simac Milano.

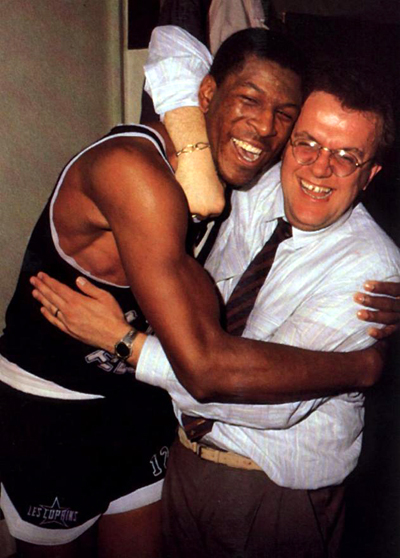
Bucci and Elvis Rolle, after the 1984 title

His second year in Virtus was mediocre, reaching seventh place in the championship, while in the 1984–85 FIBA European Champions Cup they got to the top six where they came last in the group. Leaving the city of Bologna, he spent six years coaching in Serie A2 coaching, first at Enichem Livorno and then Glaxo Verona getting the unique achievement, the conquest of the Italian Cup (against Philips Milano) for the first and only time in history by club from A2 (1990–91). Following these successes, he joined Scavolini Pesaro. The participation of the team in the final of the play-offs and the winning of the Italian Cup made its year successful, despite the club's defeat in the double final of 1991–92 FIBA Korać Cup by il Messaggero Roma of the Croatian superstar Dino Rađa.

In the 1992-93 season Alberto Bucci led Scavolini to the play-off semi-final despite the 7th place of the regular season, while in 1992–93 FIBA European League they reached the quarter-finals where they were eliminated by Benetton Treviso, coached another Croatian superstar, Toni Kukoč.

In the summer of 1993 Ettore Messina withdraw from Virtus Bologna tο take charge of the national team, which led Alberto Bucci to return to the Bianconero of Bologna after eight years. He stayed there for four years and thanks to a well-built roster which had enough Italian internationals and foreign players in class of "Saša" Danilović and Arijan Komazec, he won two domestic leagues (1993–94, 1994–95), an Italian Cup (1996–97) and a Super Cup (1995). Despite the domestic titles, Alberto Bucci couldn't lead Virtus to do the overrun in Europe and get to a Final Four after being eliminated twice in the quarter-finals by Olympiacos (1993-94) and Panathinaikos (1994-95), while twice reaching only the last 16 (1995-96, 1996-97).

In the summer of 1997 he resigned from Virtus and almost abruptly from the scene. His hiring by Fabriano in the 1999-2000 season and Progresso Castelmaggiore the 2003-04 season were his last jobs with professional clubs.

In 2016 Bucci was appointed president of Virtus Bologna. As president, Bucci faced the first relegation in the history of the club, however, he also laid the ground to the rebuilding under the new ownership of Massimo Zanetti, which will bring back Virtus to EuroLeague.

Bucci died on 9 March 2019, due to complications from a cancer; tributes were paid by all the Italian sports movement, notably including his close friend and fellow sports manager Carlo Ancelotti.

== Career achievements and awards ==
- Italian League: 3 (with Virtus Bologna: 1983-84, 1993–94, 1994–95)
- Italian Cup: 4 (with Virtus Bologna: 1983-84, 1996–97, with Scaligera Verona: 1990-91 and Victoria Libertas Pesaro: 1991-92)
- Italian Supercup: 1 (with Virtus Bologna: 1995)
- promotions in Serie A1: 3 (with Fabriano: 1981-82, with Libertas Livorno: 1985-86 and Scaligera Verona: 1990-91)

also

- FIBA European Champions Cup quarterfinalist - (with Virtus Bologna: 1984-85, 1993-94, 1994-95 and Victoria Libertas Pesaro: 1992-93)
- FIBA Korać Cup finalist - (with Victoria Libertas Pesaro: 1991-92)
- Italian Basketball Hall of Fame: (2015)
