= Unipol Hall =

Indoor arena in Bologna, Italy

- Interactive map of Unipol Hall
- Location: Viale della Fiera, 40128, Bologna
- Coordinates: 44°30′39.16″N 11°21′58.12″E
- Owner: BolognaFiere
- Capacity: Basketball: 11,000
- Surface: Parquet

Construction
- Groundbreaking: 25 June 2025
- Built: 2025–ongoing
- Opened: TBD

Tenant
- Virtus Bologna (2026–present)

Website
- www.bolognafiere.it

Unipol Hall is a multi-purpose indoor arena currently under construction within the Fiera District in Bologna, Italy. Scheduled to open in 2026, it will become the new home venue of Virtus Bologna, replacing the club's temporary facilities with a permanent arena. The venue is designed to accommodate approximately 11,000 spectators for sporting events and will also include training facilities, hospitality areas, restaurants, and commercial spaces. The arena was projected by the Italian architect, Mario Cucinella.

Beyond basketball, Unipol Hall is intended to host concerts, conventions, trade fair events, and major international sporting competitions. It has been selected as the future venue for the Davis Cup Finals. The arena is being developed by BolognaFiere as part of a broader redevelopment of the exhibition district, with completion of the arena scheduled for November 2026.

== See also ==
- List of indoor arenas in Italy
