= Mouhamet Diouf =

Senegalese-Italian basketball player

- Diouf with Virtus Bologna in 2026

No. 35 – Virtus Bologna
- Position: Center
- League: LBA; EuroLeague

Personal information
- Born: 10 September 2001 (age 25) Dakar, Senegal
- Listed height: 2.08 m (6 ft 10 in)
- Listed weight: 105 kg (231 lb)

Career information
- NBA draft: 2023: undrafted

Career history
- 2018–2023: Pallacanestro Reggiana
- 2023–2024: Breogán
- 2024–present: Virtus Bologna

Career highlights
- Lega Serie A champion (2025)

Mouhamet "Momo" Diouf (born 10 September 2001) is a Senegalese–Italian professional basketball player for Virtus Bologna of the Italian Lega Basket Serie A (LBA) and the EuroLeague.

== Career ==
Born in Dakar, the capital of Senegal, and raised in Sant'Ilario d'Enza in the Province of Reggio Emilia, Italy, Diouf took his first steps in basketball with the local team before joining the youth ranks of Pallacanestro Reggiana in 2016. After making his professional debut during the 2018–19 season, he signed his first pro contract in August 2019, officially joining the first team. In the 2022–23 season, Diouf averaged 14 minutes, 6 points, and 3.2 rebounds per game in the Italian league with Reggio Emilia. On 6 July 2023, Diouf moved to Spain, signing with CB Breogán of the Liga ACB for the 2023–24 season.

In July 2024, he returned to Italy, signing with Virtus Bologna, where he made his debut in the EuroLeague. After arriving first in the national championship season, Virtus eliminated Reyer Venezia 3–2 and their arch-rival Olimpia Milano 3–1, reaching their fifth finals in a row. They then defeated Brescia 3–0, claiming the Italian championship title for the 17th time. For Diouf, this was the first scudetto of his career.

== National team career ==
In August 2023, he was named to the Italian national team roster by head coach Gianmarco Pozzecco for the FIBA Basketball World Cup, held in Japan, the Philippines, and Indonesia, where the Azzurri finished in eighth place following the classification games.
