= Saliou Niang =

Italian basketball player (born 2004)

- Niang with Virtus Bologna in 2025

No. 7 – LSU Tigers
- Position: Small forward
- Conference: Southeastern Conference

Personal information
- Born: 14 May 2004 (age 22) Dakar, Senegal
- Listed height: 6 ft 7 in (2.01 m)
- Listed weight: 200 lb (91 kg)

Career information
- College: LSU (2026–present)
- NBA draft: 2025: 2nd round, 58th overall pick
- Drafted by: Cleveland Cavaliers
- Playing career: 2021–present

Career history
- 2021–2023: Fortitudo Bologna
- 2023–2025: Aquila Trento
- 2025–2026: Virtus Bologna

Career highlights
- Italian Lega A Most Improved Player (2025); Italian Cup winner (2025)
- Stats at NBA.com
- Stats at Basketball Reference
Medals
Men's basketball
Representing Italy

Saliou Niang (born 14 May 2004) is a Senegalese-Italian college basketball player for the LSU Tigers of the Southeastern Conference (SEC). He has previously played for Virtus Bologna and Aquila Trento of the Italian Lega Basket Serie A (LBA). Niang was selected by the Cleveland Cavaliers with the 58th pick in the 2025 NBA draft.

== Early life ==
In 2004, Niang was born in Dakar, Senegal. He moved to Italy at the age of two and spent his childhood in Mandello del Lario, in the province of Lecco. He grew up with his junior team, Fortitudo Bologna, before making his debut for them in 2022.

== College career ==
After getting drafted in the 2025 NBA draft and spending the season with Virtus Bologna, Niang drew interest from NCAA teams such as LSU, North Carolina, Duke, and Arizona. Niang chose to commit to play for LSU on 19 May 2026. In October 2026, Niang received NCAA eligibility to begin playing college basketball at LSU.

== Basketball career ==
=== Fortitudo Bologna ===
On 5 May 2022, Saliou Niang made his debut for Fortitudo Bologna, playing one minute off the bench in a six-point victory, where he committed one turnover and failed to record any other stats. In 2023, he played on Aquila Basket Trento.

=== Aquila Basket Trento ===
After receiving minimal playing time with Fortitudo Bologna, Niang went to play for Aquila Basket Trento. He debuted on 29 November 2023. In his 2nd outing with the team, he shot 80% from the field, finishing the game with ten points, seven rebounds, and two assists, all of which were career highs. Later in the Lega Serie-A season, he scored a season-high 16 points, all from 2-pointers. Aquila Basket Trento won the Italian Basketball Cup for the first time in 2025.

=== NBA Draft and Virtus Bologna ===
On 26 June 2025, Niang was drafted as the 28th pick of the second round (58th overall) by the Cleveland Cavaliers in the 2025 NBA draft. Instead of signing in the NBA, Niang played for Virtus Bologna the following season, the reigning champions of the Lega Basket Serie A (LBA). Virtus Bologna went on to finish with the best record of the 2025-2026 Italian Lega Basket Serie A regular season, at 23-5.

=== International Career ===
Niang played with Italy at FIBA EuroBasket 2025, where he appeared in 5 games for the National Team.
