= Nenad Jakovljević =

Serbian basketball coach

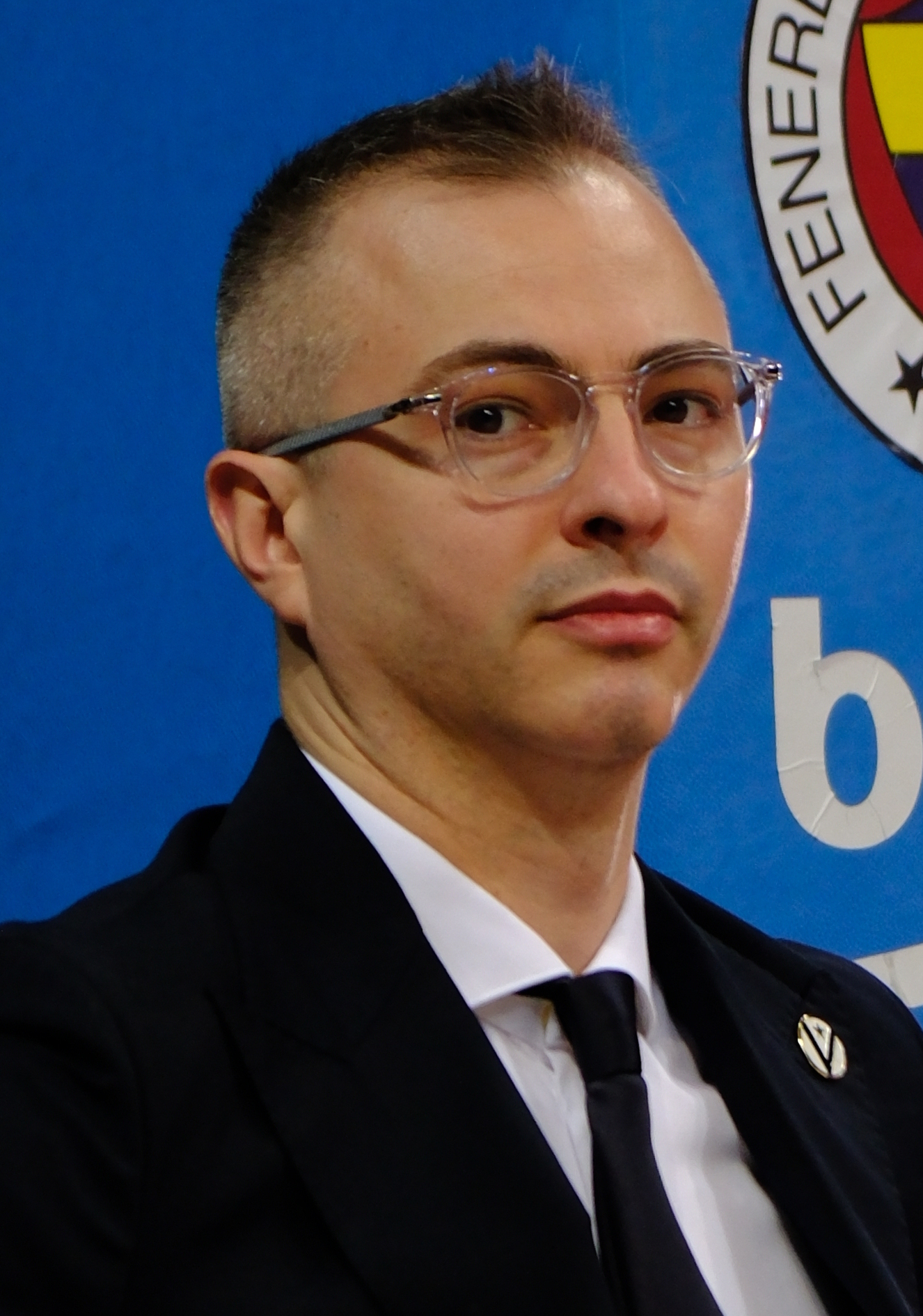
- Jakovljević in 2025

Guangdong Southern Tigers
- Position: Head coach
- League: CBA

Personal information
- Born: 30 October 1988 (age 38) Sremska Mitrovica, SR Serbia, Yugoslavia
- Coaching career: 2011–present

Career history

Coaching
- 2011–2015: Virtus Alto Garda (youth)
- 2015: Bayern Munich (youth)
- 2015–2020: Dolomiti Energia Trento (youth)
- 2022–present: Serbia (assistant)
- 2022–2023: Crvena zvezda (assistant)
- 2023–2026: Virtus Bologna (assistant)
- 2026: Virtus Bologna
- 2026–present: Guangdong Southern Tigers

Career highlights
- As assistant coach: Italian League champion (2025); Serbian League champion (2023)

Nenad Jakovljević (Serbian Cyrillic: Ненад Јаковљевић; born 30 October 1988) is a Serbian-Italian professional basketball coach, currently serving as the head coach for the Guangdong Southern Tigers of the Chinese Basketball Association (CBA). He is also working as an assistant coach for Serbia.

== Coaching career ==
Jakovljević spent most of his early coaching career in Italy working for youth systems of Virtus Alto Garda (based in Riva del Garda) and Dolomiti Energia Trento. In 2015, he had a stint with Bayern Munich working as an assistant coach of Svetislav Pešić.

In August 2022, Crvena zvezda added Jakovljević to their coaching staff as an assistant coach for the 2022–23 season.

In August 2022, Serbia national team head coach Svetislav Pešić added Jakovljević as Assistant Coach to his coaching staff. He was a staff member at EuroBasket 2022, WorldCup 2023, Olympic Games 2024 and EuroBasket 2025.

In December 2023, Jakovljević joined Virtus Bologna, becoming the assistant coach of Luca Banchi, and then of Duško Ivanović, with whom he won the 2025 LBA title. On 27 March 2026, Ivanović was fired and Jakovljević became the new head coach.

On 25 August 2026, Jakovljević was named as the new head coach of Guangdong Southern Tigers.

== Personal life ==
Jakovljević moved to Trento, Italy at age 17. He earned his bachelor's degree in political science from the University of Trento in 2013 and earned his master's degree in sports marketing and management from the Ca' Foscari University of Venice in 2015.
