= Renzo Ranuzzi =

Italian basketball player (1924–2014)

Personal information
- Nationality: Italian
- Born: 15 July 1924 Bologna, Italy
- Died: 16 March 2014 (aged 89) Bologna, Italy

Sport
- Sport: Basketball

Renzo Ranuzzi (15 July 1924 – 16 March 2014) was an Italian basketball player. He competed in the men's tournament at the 1948 Summer Olympics and the 1952 Summer Olympics.
