= Karim Jallow =

German basketball player (born 1997)

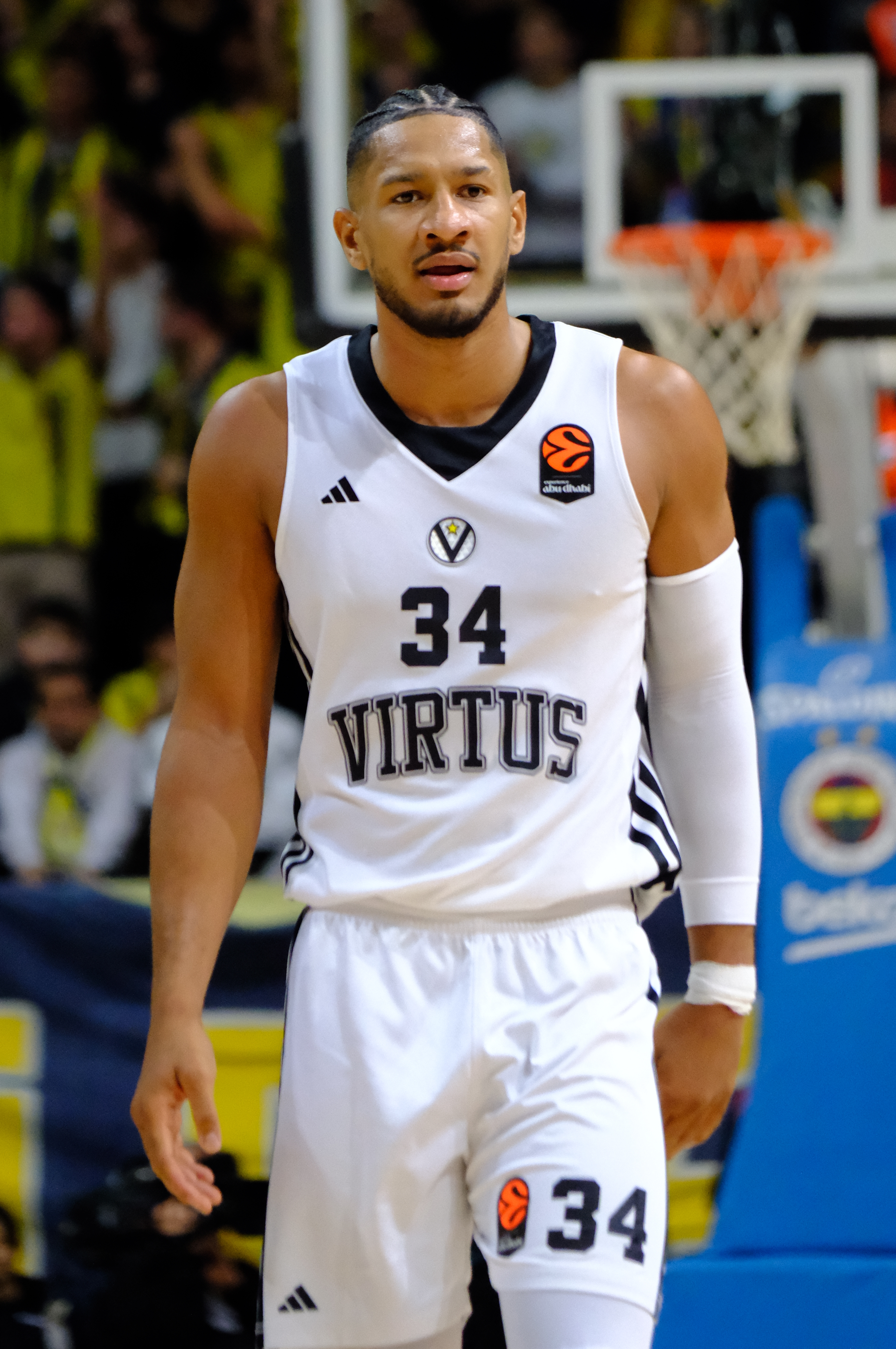
- Jallow with Virtus in 2025

No. 35 – Derthona Basket
- Position: Power forward / small forward
- League: LBA; EuroCup

Personal information
- Born: April 13, 1997 (age 29) Munich, Germany
- Listed height: 6 ft 6 in (1.98 m)
- Listed weight: 198 lb (90 kg)

Career information
- Playing career: 2015–present

Career history
- 2015–2019: Bayern Munich
- 2018–2019: →MHP Riesen Ludwigsburg
- 2019–2021: Löwen Braunschweig
- 2021–2025: Ratiopharm Ulm
- 2025–2026: Virtus Bologna
- 2026–present: Derthona Basket

Career highlights
- 2× Bundesliga champion (2018, 2023); All-Bundesliga First Team (2025); 2× All-Bundesliga Second Team (2021, 2023); German Cup winner (2018)

Karim Johannes Jallow (born April 13, 1997) is a Gambian–German professional basketball player for Derthona Basket of the Italian Lega Basket Serie A (LBA) and the EuroCup.

== Early life ==
Jallow was born in Munich, Germany as the first child of a German mother and a Gambian father. He first began playing soccer but picked up basketball at age 9, joining the FC Bayern Munich under-10 team and often playing outdoor basketball with his father. Growing up, Jallow looked up to Kobe Bryant but expressed admiration for Giannis Antetokounmpo later in his career.

== Professional career ==
=== Seasons in Germany with Bayern, Ludwigsburg, Braunschweig and Ulm (2015–2025) ===
On July 14, 2015, Jallow signed his first professional contract with FC Bayern Munich of the Basketball Bundesliga. On July 3, 2017, Jallow extended his contract with Bayern Munich until 2020. Team manager Marko Pešić said, "Karim is one of our biggest talents; he still hasn't stopped developing." On April 13, 2018, Jallow entered the 2018 NBA draft. For the 2018–19 season, Bayern sent Jallow on loan to MHP Riesen Ludwigsburg.

In July 2019, Jallow signed a three-year contract with Basketball Löwen Braunschweig. On June 28, 2021, he has signed with Ratiopharm Ulm of the German Basketball Bundesliga. He won the German championship with Ulm in 2023.

=== Virtus Bologna (2025–2026) ===
On July 14, 2025, Jallow signed a two-years deal with Virtus Bologna of the Italian Lega Basket Serie A (LBA) and the EuroLeague, making his debut in the top-tier European league.

=== Derthona Basket (2026–present) ===
On July 8, 2026, Jallow signed with the fellow Italian club, Derthona Basket of the Lega Basket Serie A (LBA).
