= List of Yugoslavia men's national basketball team rosters =

Below is a list of the Yugoslavia men's national basketball team rosters from 1947 to 1991 at the EuroBasket, the FIBA Basketball World Cup and the Summer Olympics:

== 1940s ==
=== 1947 EuroBasket ===
Yugoslavia finished 13th among 14 teams.

Yugoslavia men's national basketball team roster
Players
Coaches

Pos.	No.	Name	Age – Date of birth	Height	Club
	3	Tullio Rochlitzer	20 – 23 December 1926		Zadar	(Socialist Federal Republic of Yugoslavia)
C	4	Mirko Marjanović	20 – 2 May 1926	1.92 m (6 ft 4 in)	Partizan	(Socialist Federal Republic of Yugoslavia)
G	5	Miodrag Stefanović	24 – 20 October 1922	1.75 m (5 ft 9 in)		(Socialist Federal Republic of Yugoslavia)
	6	Božo Grkinić (C)	33 – 17 November 1913			(Socialist Federal Republic of Yugoslavia)
F/C	7	Ladislav Demšar	18 – 25 January 1929	1.87 m (6 ft 2 in)	Egység	(Socialist Federal Republic of Yugoslavia)
	8	Nebojša Popović	24 – 8 February 1923		Crvena zvezda	(Socialist Federal Republic of Yugoslavia)
	9	Zlatko Kovačević	29 – 20 June 1917		Partizan	(Socialist Federal Republic of Yugoslavia)
G	10	Aleksandar Gec	19 – 3 March 1928	1.89 m (6 ft 2 in)	Crvena zvezda	(Socialist Federal Republic of Yugoslavia)
	11	Aleksandar Milojković	–			(Socialist Federal Republic of Yugoslavia)
SF	12	Srđan Kalember	18 – 5 June 1928	1.80 m (5 ft 11 in)	Crvena zvezda	(Socialist Federal Republic of Yugoslavia)
SG	13	Zorko Cvetković	22 – 24 September 1924			(Socialist Federal Republic of Yugoslavia)
	14	Ottone Olivieri	–		Kvarner	(Socialist Federal Republic of Yugoslavia)
	15	Božidar Munćan	–		Partizan	(Socialist Federal Republic of Yugoslavia)

Head coach

- (Socialist Federal Republic of Yugoslavia) Stevica Čolović

Legend

- Club – describes last
  club before the tournament
- Age – describes age
  on 24 April 1947

=== 1948 Olympic Games ===
Yugoslavia did not participate.

=== 1949 EuroBasket ===
Yugoslavia did not participate.

== 1950s ==
=== 1950 World Championship ===
Yugoslavia finished 10th among 10 teams.

Yugoslavia men's national basketball team roster
Players
Coaches

Pos.	No.	Name	Age – Date of birth	Height	Club
	3	Mirko Amon	–		Železničar Ljubljana	(Socialist Federal Republic of Yugoslavia)
C	4	Aleksandar Blašković	20 – 30 November 1929	1.90 m (6 ft 3 in)	Mladost Zagreb	(Socialist Federal Republic of Yugoslavia)
	5	Lajos Engler	22 – 20 June 1928		Partizan	(Socialist Federal Republic of Yugoslavia)
G	6	Dušan Radojčić	–		Proleter Zrenjanin	(Socialist Federal Republic of Yugoslavia)
C	7	Ladislav Demšar	21 – 25 January 1929	1.87 m (6 ft 2 in)	Crvena zvezda	(Socialist Federal Republic of Yugoslavia)
	8	Nebojša Popović	27 – 8 February 1923		Crvena zvezda	(Socialist Federal Republic of Yugoslavia)
G	10	Aleksandar Gec	22 – 3 March 1928	1.89 m (6 ft 2 in)	Crvena zvezda	(Socialist Federal Republic of Yugoslavia)
C	11	Milorad Sokolović	28 – 10 August 1922	1.90 m (6 ft 3 in)	Crvena zvezda	(Socialist Federal Republic of Yugoslavia)
SF	12	Srđan Kalember	22 – 5 June 1928	1.80 m (5 ft 11 in)	Crvena zvezda	(Socialist Federal Republic of Yugoslavia)
	13	Vilmos Lóczi	25 – 19 January 1925		Partizan	(Socialist Federal Republic of Yugoslavia)
	14	Milenko Novaković	21 – 10 April 1929		Partizan	(Socialist Federal Republic of Yugoslavia)
C	15	Borislav Stanković	25 – 9 July 1925		Železničar Belgrade	(Socialist Federal Republic of Yugoslavia)

Head coach

- (Socialist Federal Republic of Yugoslavia) Nebojša Popović

Legend

- Club – describes last
  club before the tournament
- Age – describes age
  on 22 October 1950

=== 1951 EuroBasket ===
Yugoslavia did not participate.

=== 1952 Olympic Games ===
Yugoslavia did not participate.

=== 1953 EuroBasket ===
Yugoslavia finished 6th among 17 teams

Yugoslavia men's national basketball team roster
Players
Coaches

Pos.	No.	Name	Age – Date of birth	Height	Club
	3	Borko Jovanović	–		Crvena zvezda	(Socialist Federal Republic of Yugoslavia)
C	4	Mirko Marjanović	27 – 2 May 1926	1.92 m (6 ft 4 in)	Partizan	(Socialist Federal Republic of Yugoslavia)
G	5	Milan Bjegojević	24 – 9 August 1928	1.81 m (5 ft 11 in)	Crvena zvezda	(Socialist Federal Republic of Yugoslavia)
G	6	Đorđe Andrijašević	22 – 5 May 1931	1.81 m (5 ft 11 in)	Crvena zvezda	(Socialist Federal Republic of Yugoslavia)
C	7	Ladislav Demšar	24 – 25 January 1929	1.87 m (6 ft 2 in)	Crvena zvezda	(Socialist Federal Republic of Yugoslavia)
C	8	Borislav Stanković	27 – 9 July 1925		Partizan	(Socialist Federal Republic of Yugoslavia)
	9	Dragan Godžić	26 – 14 April 1927		Crvena zvezda	(Socialist Federal Republic of Yugoslavia)
G	10	Aleksandar Gec	25 – 3 March 1928	1.89 m (6 ft 2 in)	Crvena zvezda	(Socialist Federal Republic of Yugoslavia)
C	11	Aleksandar Blašković	23 – 30 November 1929	1.90 m (6 ft 3 in)	Mladost Zagreb	(Socialist Federal Republic of Yugoslavia)
SF	12	Srđan Kalember	24 – 5 June 1928	1.80 m (5 ft 11 in)	Crvena zvezda	(Socialist Federal Republic of Yugoslavia)
	13	Vilmos Lóczi	28 – 19 January 1925		Proleter Zrenjanin	(Socialist Federal Republic of Yugoslavia)
	14	Borislav Ćurčić	21 – 27 January 1932	1.83 m (6 ft 0 in)	Crvena zvezda	(Socialist Federal Republic of Yugoslavia)
	15	Lajos Engler	24 – 20 June 1928		Partizan	(Socialist Federal Republic of Yugoslavia)

Head coach

- (Socialist Federal Republic of Yugoslavia) Nebojša Popović

Legend

- Club – describes last
  club before the tournament
- Age – describes age
  on 23 May 1953

=== 1954 World Championship ===
Yugoslavia finished 11th among 12 teams.

Yugoslavia men's national basketball team roster
Players
Coaches

Pos.	No.	Name	Age – Date of birth	Height	Club
C	3	Bogdan Müller	–	2.00 m (6 ft 7 in)	Enotnost	(Socialist Federal Republic of Yugoslavia)
C	4	Mirko Marjanović	28 – 2 May 1926	1.92 m (6 ft 4 in)	Partizan	(Socialist Federal Republic of Yugoslavia)
G	5	Milan Bjegojević	26 – 9 August 1928	1.81 m (5 ft 11 in)	Crvena zvezda	(Socialist Federal Republic of Yugoslavia)
G	6	Đorđe Andrijašević	23 – 5 May 1931	1.81 m (5 ft 11 in)	Crvena zvezda	(Socialist Federal Republic of Yugoslavia)
	7	Lajos Engler	26 – 20 June 1928		Proleter Zrenjanin	(Socialist Federal Republic of Yugoslavia)
C	8	Đorđe Konjović	23 – 2 January 1931	2.02 m (6 ft 8 in)	Crvena zvezda	(Socialist Federal Republic of Yugoslavia)
	9	Dragan Godžić	27 – 14 April 1927		Crvena zvezda	(Socialist Federal Republic of Yugoslavia)
	10	Milan Blagojević	25 – 27 July 1929		Partizan	(Socialist Federal Republic of Yugoslavia)
C	11	Aleksandar Blašković	24 – 30 November 1929	1.90 m (6 ft 3 in)	Mladost Zagreb	(Socialist Federal Republic of Yugoslavia)
	12	Boris Kristančič	22 – 2 January 1932	1.76 m (5 ft 9 in)	Enotnost	(Socialist Federal Republic of Yugoslavia)
	13	Vilmos Lóczi	29 – 19 January 1925		Proleter Zrenjanin	(Socialist Federal Republic of Yugoslavia)
	14	Borislav Ćurčić	22 – 27 January 1932	1.83 m (6 ft 0 in)	Crvena zvezda	(Socialist Federal Republic of Yugoslavia)

Head coach

- (Socialist Federal Republic of Yugoslavia) Aleksandar Nikolić

Legend

- Club – describes last
  club before the tournament
- Age – describes age
  on 23 October 1954

=== 1955 EuroBasket ===
Yugoslavia finished 8th among 18 teams.

Yugoslavia men's national basketball team roster
Players
Coaches

Pos.	No.	Name	Age – Date of birth	Height	Club
C	3	Bogdan Müller	–	2.00 m (6 ft 7 in)	AŠK Olimpija	(Socialist Federal Republic of Yugoslavia)
SG	4	Milutin Minja	–		Proleter Zrenjanin	(Socialist Federal Republic of Yugoslavia)
G	5	Milan Bjegojević	26 – 9 August 1928	1.81 m (5 ft 11 in)	Crvena zvezda	(Socialist Federal Republic of Yugoslavia)
G	6	Đorđe Andrijašević	24 – 5 May 1931	1.81 m (5 ft 11 in)	Crvena zvezda	(Socialist Federal Republic of Yugoslavia)
C	7	Ladislav Demšar	26 – 25 January 1929	1.87 m (6 ft 2 in)	Crvena zvezda	(Socialist Federal Republic of Yugoslavia)
	8	Obren Popović	–	1.90 m (6 ft 3 in)	Crvena zvezda	(Socialist Federal Republic of Yugoslavia)
C	9	Đorđe Konjović	24 – 2 January 1931	2.02 m (6 ft 8 in)	Crvena zvezda	(Socialist Federal Republic of Yugoslavia)
	10	Jože Zupančič	–		Železničar Ljubljana	(Socialist Federal Republic of Yugoslavia)
C	11	Aleksandar Blašković	25 – 30 November 1929	1.90 m (6 ft 3 in)	Mladost Zagreb	(Socialist Federal Republic of Yugoslavia)
F/C	12	Ljubomir Katić	21 – 25 April 1934	1.88 m (6 ft 2 in)	Proleter Zrenjanin	(Socialist Federal Republic of Yugoslavia)
	13	Vilmos Lóczi	30 – 19 January 1925		Proleter Zrenjanin	(Socialist Federal Republic of Yugoslavia)
	14	Borislav Ćurčić	23 – 27 January 1932	1.83 m (6 ft 0 in)	Crvena zvezda	(Socialist Federal Republic of Yugoslavia)

Head coach

- (Socialist Federal Republic of Yugoslavia) Aleksandar Nikolić

Legend

- Club – describes last
  club before the tournament
- Age – describes age
  on 7 June 1955

=== 1956 Olympic Games ===
Yugoslavia did not participate.

=== 1957 EuroBasket ===
Yugoslavia finished 6th among 16 teams.

Yugoslavia men's national basketball team roster
Players
Coaches

Pos.	No.	Name	Age – Date of birth	Height	Club
	3	Miodrag Nikolić	18 – 22 August 1938	1.88 m (6 ft 2 in)	OKK Beograd	(Socialist Federal Republic of Yugoslavia)
	4	Marjan Kandus	24 – 23 September 1932	1.86 m (6 ft 1 in)	AŠK Olimpija	(Socialist Federal Republic of Yugoslavia)
PG	5	Branko Radović	23 – 5 December 1933		Crvena zvezda	(Socialist Federal Republic of Yugoslavia)
	7	Lajos Engler	29 – 20 June 1928		Proleter Zrenjanin	(Socialist Federal Republic of Yugoslavia)
F/C	8	Ljubomir Katić	23 – 25 April 1934	1.88 m (6 ft 2 in)	Proleter Zrenjanin	(Socialist Federal Republic of Yugoslavia)
SG	9	Milutin Minja	–		Proleter Zrenjanin	(Socialist Federal Republic of Yugoslavia)
PG	10	Ivo Daneu	19 – 6 October 1937	1.91 m (6 ft 3 in)	AŠK Olimpija	(Socialist Federal Republic of Yugoslavia)
	11	Branko Miletić	–			(Socialist Federal Republic of Yugoslavia)
C	12	Bogdan Müller	–	2.00 m (6 ft 7 in)	Železničar Ljubljana	(Socialist Federal Republic of Yugoslavia)
	13	Vilmos Lóczi	32 – 19 January 1925		Proleter Zrenjanin	(Socialist Federal Republic of Yugoslavia)
	14	Boris Kristančič	25 – 2 January 1932	1.76 m (5 ft 9 in)	AŠK Olimpija	(Socialist Federal Republic of Yugoslavia)
	15	Matja Dermastija	–		AŠK Olimpija	(Socialist Federal Republic of Yugoslavia)

Head coach

- (Socialist Federal Republic of Yugoslavia) Aleksandar Nikolić

Assistant coach(es)

- (Socialist Federal Republic of Yugoslavia) Borislav Stanković

Legend

- Club – describes last
  club before the tournament
- Age – describes age
  on 20 June 1957

=== 1959 EuroBasket ===
Yugoslavia finished 9th among 17 teams.

Yugoslavia men's national basketball team roster
Players
Coaches

Pos.	No.	Name	Age – Date of birth	Height	Club
	3	Miodrag Nikolić	20 – 22 August 1938	1.88 m (6 ft 2 in)	OKK Beograd	(Socialist Federal Republic of Yugoslavia)
	4	Marjan Kandus	26 – 23 September 1932	1.86 m (6 ft 1 in)	AŠK Olimpija	(Socialist Federal Republic of Yugoslavia)
PG	5	Branko Radović	25 – 5 December 1933		Crvena zvezda	(Socialist Federal Republic of Yugoslavia)
	6	Slobodan Gordić	21 – 28 September 1937	1.92 m (6 ft 4 in)	OKK Beograd	(Socialist Federal Republic of Yugoslavia)
	7	Igor Jelnikar	22 – 27 February 1937		AŠK Olimpija	(Socialist Federal Republic of Yugoslavia)
	8	Matja Dermastija	–		AŠK Olimpija	(Socialist Federal Republic of Yugoslavia)
SG	9	Milutin Minja	–		Crvena zvezda	(Socialist Federal Republic of Yugoslavia)
PG	10	Ivo Daneu	21 – 6 October 1937	1.91 m (6 ft 3 in)	AŠK Olimpija	(Socialist Federal Republic of Yugoslavia)
PF	11	Nemanja Đurić	22 – 18 June 1936	1.95 m (6 ft 5 in)	Radnički Belgrade	(Socialist Federal Republic of Yugoslavia)
PF	12	Radivoj Korać	20 – 5 November 1938	1.95 m (6 ft 5 in)	OKK Beograd	(Socialist Federal Republic of Yugoslavia)
C	13	Radovan Radović	23 – 19 January 1936	1.87 m (6 ft 2 in)	Partizan	(Socialist Federal Republic of Yugoslavia)
	14	Boris Kristančič	27 – 2 January 1932	1.76 m (5 ft 9 in)	AŠK Olimpija	(Socialist Federal Republic of Yugoslavia)

Head coach

- (Socialist Federal Republic of Yugoslavia) Aleksandar Nikolić

Legend

- Club – describes last
  club before the tournament
- Age – describes age
  on 21 May 1959

=== 1959 World Championship ===
Yugoslavia did not participate.

== 1960s ==
=== 1960 Olympic Games ===
Yugoslavia finished 6th among 16 teams

Yugoslavia men's national basketball team roster
Players
Coaches

Pos.	No.	Name	Age – Date of birth	Height	Club
	3	Miodrag Nikolić	22 – 22 August 1938	1.88 m (6 ft 2 in)	OKK Beograd	(Socialist Federal Republic of Yugoslavia)
	4	Marjan Kandus	27 – 23 September 1932	1.86 m (6 ft 1 in)	AŠK Olimpija	(Socialist Federal Republic of Yugoslavia)
PF	5	Radivoj Korać	21 – 5 November 1938	1.95 m (6 ft 5 in)	OKK Beograd	(Socialist Federal Republic of Yugoslavia)
	6	Miha Lokar	24 – 10 September 1935	1.82 m (6 ft 0 in)	AŠK Olimpija	(Socialist Federal Republic of Yugoslavia)
	7	Boris Kristančič	28 – 2 January 1932	1.76 m (5 ft 9 in)	AŠK Olimpija	(Socialist Federal Republic of Yugoslavia)
PG	8	Josip Gjergja	22 – 24 November 1937	1.76 m (5 ft 9 in)	Zadar	(Socialist Federal Republic of Yugoslavia)
	9	Slobodan Gordić	22 – 28 September 1937	1.92 m (6 ft 4 in)	OKK Beograd	(Socialist Federal Republic of Yugoslavia)
PG	10	Ivo Daneu	22 – 6 October 1937	1.91 m (6 ft 3 in)	AŠK Olimpija	(Socialist Federal Republic of Yugoslavia)
C	11	Zvonko Petričević	20 – 26 July 1940	2.10 m (6 ft 11 in)	Mladost Zagreb	(Socialist Federal Republic of Yugoslavia)
SG	12	Sreten Dragojlović	22 – 6 May 1938	1.91 m (6 ft 3 in)	Crvena zvezda	(Socialist Federal Republic of Yugoslavia)
C	13	Radovan Radović	24 – 19 January 1936	1.87 m (6 ft 2 in)	Partizan	(Socialist Federal Republic of Yugoslavia)
PF	14	Nemanja Đurić	24 – 18 June 1936	1.95 m (6 ft 5 in)	Radnički Belgrade	(Socialist Federal Republic of Yugoslavia)

Head coach

- (Socialist Federal Republic of Yugoslavia) Aleksandar Nikolić

Assistant coach(es)

- (Socialist Federal Republic of Yugoslavia) Ranko Žeravica

Legend

- Club – describes last
  club before the tournament
- Age – describes age
  on 26 August 1960

=== 1961 EuroBasket ===
Yugoslavia finished 2nd among 19 teams.

Yugoslavia men's national basketball team roster
Players
Coaches

Pos.	No.	Name	Age – Date of birth	Height	Club
	4	Marjan Kandus	28 – 23 September 1932	1.86 m (6 ft 1 in)	AŠK Olimpija	(Socialist Federal Republic of Yugoslavia)
PF	5	Radivoj Korać	22 – 5 November 1938	1.95 m (6 ft 5 in)	OKK Beograd	(Socialist Federal Republic of Yugoslavia)
	6	Vital Eiselt	19 – 6 May 1941	1.87 m (6 ft 2 in)	AŠK Olimpija	(Socialist Federal Republic of Yugoslavia)
	7	Miha Lokar	25 – 10 September 1935	1.82 m (6 ft 0 in)	AŠK Olimpija	(Socialist Federal Republic of Yugoslavia)
	8	Željko Troskot	–	1.88 m (6 ft 2 in)	Zadar	(Socialist Federal Republic of Yugoslavia)
	9	Slobodan Gordić	23 – 28 September 1937	1.92 m (6 ft 4 in)	OKK Beograd	(Socialist Federal Republic of Yugoslavia)
PG	10	Ivo Daneu	23 – 6 October 1937	1.91 m (6 ft 3 in)	AŠK Olimpija	(Socialist Federal Republic of Yugoslavia)
C	11	Zvonko Petričević	20 – 26 July 1940	2.10 m (6 ft 11 in)	Lokomotiva Zagreb	(Socialist Federal Republic of Yugoslavia)
SG	12	Sreten Dragojlović	22 – 6 May 1938	1.91 m (6 ft 3 in)	Crvena zvezda	(Socialist Federal Republic of Yugoslavia)
C	13	Radovan Radović	25 – 19 January 1936	1.87 m (6 ft 2 in)	Partizan	(Socialist Federal Republic of Yugoslavia)
PF	14	Nemanja Đurić	24 – 18 June 1936	1.95 m (6 ft 5 in)	Radnički Belgrade	(Socialist Federal Republic of Yugoslavia)
	15	Miodrag Nikolić	22 – 22 August 1938	1.88 m (6 ft 2 in)	OKK Beograd	(Socialist Federal Republic of Yugoslavia)

Head coach

- (Socialist Federal Republic of Yugoslavia) Aleksandar Nikolić

Assistant coach(es)

- (Socialist Federal Republic of Yugoslavia) Ranko Žeravica

Legend

- Club – describes last
  club before the tournament
- Age – describes age
  on 29 April 1961

=== 1963 EuroBasket ===
Yugoslavia finished 3rd among 16 teams.

Yugoslavia men's national basketball team roster
Players
Coaches

Pos.	No.	Name	Age – Date of birth	Height	Club
	4	Slobodan Gordić	25 – 28 September 1937	1.92 m (6 ft 4 in)	OKK Beograd	(Socialist Federal Republic of Yugoslavia)
PF	5	Radivoj Korać	24 – 5 November 1938	1.95 m (6 ft 5 in)	OKK Beograd	(Socialist Federal Republic of Yugoslavia)
C	6	Emil Logar	–	1.97 m (6 ft 6 in)	AŠK Olimpija	(Socialist Federal Republic of Yugoslavia)
	7	Miloš Bojović	25 – 25 June 1938		Partizan	(Socialist Federal Republic of Yugoslavia)
	8	Borut Bassin	19 – 6 July 1944		AŠK Olimpija	(Socialist Federal Republic of Yugoslavia)
	9	Dragoslav Ražnatović	22 – 19 April 1941	1.90 m (6 ft 3 in)	Radnički Belgrade	(Socialist Federal Republic of Yugoslavia)
PG	10	Ivo Daneu	25 – 6 October 1937	1.91 m (6 ft 3 in)	AŠK Olimpija	(Socialist Federal Republic of Yugoslavia)
C	11	Zvonko Petričević	23 – 26 July 1940	2.10 m (6 ft 11 in)	Lokomotiva Zagreb	(Socialist Federal Republic of Yugoslavia)
C	12	Trajko Rajković	25 – 7 December 1937	2.04 m (6 ft 8 in)	OKK Beograd	(Socialist Federal Republic of Yugoslavia)
	13	Živko Kasun	–		Željezničar Karlovac	(Socialist Federal Republic of Yugoslavia)
PF	14	Nemanja Đurić	27 – 18 June 1936	1.95 m (6 ft 5 in)	Radnički Belgrade	(Socialist Federal Republic of Yugoslavia)
	15	Miodrag Nikolić	25 – 22 August 1938	1.88 m (6 ft 2 in)	OKK Beograd	(Socialist Federal Republic of Yugoslavia)

Head coach

- (Socialist Federal Republic of Yugoslavia) Aleksandar Nikolić

Assistant coach(es)

- (Socialist Federal Republic of Yugoslavia) Ranko Žeravica

Legend

- Club – describes last
  club before the tournament
- Age – describes age
  on 4 October 1963

=== 1963 World Championship ===
Yugoslavia finished 2nd among 13 teams.

Yugoslavia men's national basketball team roster
Players
Coaches

Pos.	No.	Name	Age – Date of birth	Height	Club
	4	Slobodan Gordić	25 – 28 September 1937	1.92 m (6 ft 4 in)	OKK Beograd	(Socialist Federal Republic of Yugoslavia)
PF	5	Radivoj Korać	24 – 5 November 1938	1.95 m (6 ft 5 in)	OKK Beograd	(Socialist Federal Republic of Yugoslavia)
C	6	Trajko Rajković	25 – 7 December 1937	2.04 m (6 ft 8 in)	OKK Beograd	(Socialist Federal Republic of Yugoslavia)
	7	Dragan Kovačić	23 – 5 October 1939	1.93 m (6 ft 4 in)	Lokomotiva Zagreb	(Socialist Federal Republic of Yugoslavia)
PG	8	Josip Gjergja	25 – 24 November 1937	1.76 m (5 ft 9 in)	Zadar	(Socialist Federal Republic of Yugoslavia)
	9	Dragoslav Ražnatović	22 – 19 April 1941	1.90 m (6 ft 3 in)	Radnički Belgrade	(Socialist Federal Republic of Yugoslavia)
PG	10	Ivo Daneu	25 – 6 October 1937	1.91 m (6 ft 3 in)	AŠK Olimpija	(Socialist Federal Republic of Yugoslavia)
C	11	Zvonko Petričević	22 – 26 July 1940	2.10 m (6 ft 11 in)	Lokomotiva Zagreb	(Socialist Federal Republic of Yugoslavia)
	12	Vital Eiselt	22 – 6 May 1941	1.87 m (6 ft 2 in)	AŠK Olimpija	(Socialist Federal Republic of Yugoslavia)
F	13	Vladimir Cvetković	21 – 24 May 1941	1.96 m (6 ft 5 in)	Crvena zvezda	(Socialist Federal Republic of Yugoslavia)
PF	14	Nemanja Đurić	26 – 18 June 1936	1.95 m (6 ft 5 in)	Radnički Belgrade	(Socialist Federal Republic of Yugoslavia)
	15	Miodrag Nikolić	24 – 22 August 1938	1.88 m (6 ft 2 in)	OKK Beograd	(Socialist Federal Republic of Yugoslavia)

Head coach

- (Socialist Federal Republic of Yugoslavia) Aleksandar Nikolić

Assistant coach(es)

- (Socialist Federal Republic of Yugoslavia) Ranko Žeravica

Legend

- Club – describes last
  club before the tournament
- Age – describes age
  on 12 May 1963

=== 1964 Olympic Games ===
Yugoslavia finished 7th among 16 teams

Yugoslavia men's national basketball team roster
Players
Coaches

Pos.	No.	Name	Age – Date of birth	Height	Club
	4	Slobodan Gordić	27 – 28 September 1937	1.92 m (6 ft 4 in)	OKK Beograd	(Socialist Federal Republic of Yugoslavia)
PF	5	Radivoj Korać	25 – 5 November 1938	1.95 m (6 ft 5 in)	OKK Beograd	(Socialist Federal Republic of Yugoslavia)
C	6	Trajko Rajković	26 – 7 December 1937	2.04 m (6 ft 8 in)	OKK Beograd	(Socialist Federal Republic of Yugoslavia)
	7	Dragan Kovačić	25 – 5 October 1939	1.93 m (6 ft 4 in)	Lokomotiva Zagreb	(Socialist Federal Republic of Yugoslavia)
PG	8	Josip Gjergja	26 – 24 November 1937	1.76 m (5 ft 9 in)	Zadar	(Socialist Federal Republic of Yugoslavia)
	9	Dragoslav Ražnatović	23 – 19 April 1941	1.90 m (6 ft 3 in)	Radnički Belgrade	(Socialist Federal Republic of Yugoslavia)
PG	10	Ivo Daneu	27 – 6 October 1937	1.91 m (6 ft 3 in)	AŠK Olimpija	(Socialist Federal Republic of Yugoslavia)
C	11	Zvonko Petričević	24 – 26 July 1940	2.10 m (6 ft 11 in)	Lokomotiva Zagreb	(Socialist Federal Republic of Yugoslavia)
	12	Vital Eiselt	23 – 6 May 1941	1.87 m (6 ft 2 in)	AŠK Olimpija	(Socialist Federal Republic of Yugoslavia)
F	13	Vladimir Cvetković	23 – 24 May 1941	1.96 m (6 ft 5 in)	Crvena zvezda	(Socialist Federal Republic of Yugoslavia)
PF	14	Nemanja Đurić	28 – 18 June 1936	1.95 m (6 ft 5 in)	Radnički Belgrade	(Socialist Federal Republic of Yugoslavia)
	15	Miodrag Nikolić	26 – 22 August 1938	1.88 m (6 ft 2 in)	OKK Beograd	(Socialist Federal Republic of Yugoslavia)

Head coach

- (Socialist Federal Republic of Yugoslavia) Aleksandar Nikolić

Assistant coach(es)

- (Socialist Federal Republic of Yugoslavia) Ranko Žeravica

Legend

- Club – describes last
  club before the tournament
- Age – describes age
  on 11 October 1964

=== 1965 EuroBasket ===
Yugoslavia finished 2nd among 16 teams

Yugoslavia men's national basketball team roster
Players
Coaches

Pos.	No.	Name	Age – Date of birth	Height	Club
	4	Slobodan Gordić	27 – 28 September 1937	1.92 m (6 ft 4 in)	OKK Beograd	(Socialist Federal Republic of Yugoslavia)
PF	5	Radivoj Korać	26 – 5 November 1938	1.95 m (6 ft 5 in)	OKK Beograd	(Socialist Federal Republic of Yugoslavia)
C	6	Trajko Rajković	27 – 7 December 1937	2.04 m (6 ft 8 in)	OKK Beograd	(Socialist Federal Republic of Yugoslavia)
	7	Dragan Kovačić	25 – 5 October 1939	1.93 m (6 ft 4 in)	Lokomotiva Zagreb	(Socialist Federal Republic of Yugoslavia)
PG	8	Josip Gjergja	27 – 24 November 1937	1.76 m (5 ft 9 in)	Zadar	(Socialist Federal Republic of Yugoslavia)
	9	Dragoslav Ražnatović	24 – 19 April 1941	1.90 m (6 ft 3 in)	Radnički Belgrade	(Socialist Federal Republic of Yugoslavia)
PG	10	Ivo Daneu	27 – 6 October 1937	1.91 m (6 ft 3 in)	AŠK Olimpija	(Socialist Federal Republic of Yugoslavia)
C	11	Zvonko Petričević	24 – 26 July 1940	2.10 m (6 ft 11 in)	Lokomotiva Zagreb	(Socialist Federal Republic of Yugoslavia)
	12	Vital Eiselt	24 – 6 May 1941	1.87 m (6 ft 2 in)	AŠK Olimpija	(Socialist Federal Republic of Yugoslavia)
	13	Miloš Bojović	26 – 25 June 1938		Partizan	(Socialist Federal Republic of Yugoslavia)
PF	14	Nemanja Đurić	28 – 18 June 1936	1.95 m (6 ft 5 in)	Radnički Belgrade	(Socialist Federal Republic of Yugoslavia)
C	15	Petar Skansi	21 – 23 November 1943	2.06 m (6 ft 9 in)	Jugoplastika	(Socialist Federal Republic of Yugoslavia)

Head coach

- (Socialist Federal Republic of Yugoslavia) Aleksandar Nikolić

Assistant coach(es)

- (Socialist Federal Republic of Yugoslavia) Ranko Žeravica

Legend

- Club – describes last
  club before the tournament
- Age – describes age
  on 30 May 1965

=== 1967 EuroBasket ===
Yugoslavia finished 9th among 16 teams.

Yugoslavia men's national basketball team roster
Players
Coaches

Pos.	No.	Name	Age – Date of birth	Height	Club
	4	Borut Bassin	23 – 6 July 1944		AŠK Olimpija	(Socialist Federal Republic of Yugoslavia)
SG	5	Ljubodrag Simonović	18 – 1 January 1949	1.96 m (6 ft 5 in)	Crvena zvezda	(Socialist Federal Republic of Yugoslavia)
	6	Zoran Marojević	25 – 27 April 1942	2.04 m (6 ft 8 in)	OKK Beograd	(Socialist Federal Republic of Yugoslavia)
SF	7	Dragan Kapičić	19 – 7 August 1948	1.98 m (6 ft 6 in)	Crvena zvezda	(Socialist Federal Republic of Yugoslavia)
F	8	Vladimir Cvetković	26 – 24 May 1941	1.96 m (6 ft 5 in)	Crvena zvezda	(Socialist Federal Republic of Yugoslavia)
	9	Dragoslav Ražnatović	26 – 19 April 1941	1.90 m (6 ft 3 in)	Radnički Belgrade	(Socialist Federal Republic of Yugoslavia)
SG	10	Ratomir Tvrdić	24 – 14 September 1943	1.85 m (6 ft 1 in)	Jugoplastika	(Socialist Federal Republic of Yugoslavia)
C	11	Krešimir Ćosić	18 – 26 November 1948	2.11 m (6 ft 11 in)	Zadar	(Socialist Federal Republic of Yugoslavia)
SF	12	Damir Šolman	18 – 7 September 1949	2.00 m (6 ft 7 in)	Mladost Zagreb	(Socialist Federal Republic of Yugoslavia)
	13	Goran Brajković	–		Zadar	(Socialist Federal Republic of Yugoslavia)
F	14	Aljoša Zorga	20 – 25 February 1947	2.00 m (6 ft 7 in)	AŠK Olimpija	(Socialist Federal Republic of Yugoslavia)
C	15	Petar Skansi	23 – 23 November 1943	2.06 m (6 ft 9 in)	Jugoplastika	(Socialist Federal Republic of Yugoslavia)

Head coach

- (Socialist Federal Republic of Yugoslavia) Ranko Žeravica

Legend

- Club – describes last
  club before the tournament
- Age – describes age
  on 28 September 1967

=== 1967 World Championship ===
Yugoslavia finished 2nd among 13 teams

Yugoslavia men's national basketball team roster
Players
Coaches

Pos.	No.	Name	Age – Date of birth	Height	Club
	4	Borut Bassin	22 – 6 July 1944		AŠK Olimpija	(Socialist Federal Republic of Yugoslavia)
PF	5	Radivoj Korać	28 – 5 November 1938	1.95 m (6 ft 5 in)	OKK Beograd	(Socialist Federal Republic of Yugoslavia)
C	6	Trajko Rajković	29 – 7 December 1937	2.04 m (6 ft 8 in)	OKK Beograd	(Socialist Federal Republic of Yugoslavia)
	7	Dragan Kovačić	27 – 5 October 1939	1.93 m (6 ft 4 in)	Lokomotiva Zagreb	(Socialist Federal Republic of Yugoslavia)
F	8	Vladimir Cvetković	26 – 24 May 1941	1.96 m (6 ft 5 in)	Crvena zvezda	(Socialist Federal Republic of Yugoslavia)
	9	Dragoslav Ražnatović	26 – 19 April 1941	1.90 m (6 ft 3 in)	Radnički Belgrade	(Socialist Federal Republic of Yugoslavia)
PG	10	Ivo Daneu	29 – 6 October 1937	1.91 m (6 ft 3 in)	AŠK Olimpija	(Socialist Federal Republic of Yugoslavia)
C	11	Krešimir Ćosić	18 – 26 November 1948	2.11 m (6 ft 11 in)	Zadar	(Socialist Federal Republic of Yugoslavia)
PG	12	Josip Gjergja	29 – 24 November 1937	1.76 m (5 ft 9 in)	Zadar	(Socialist Federal Republic of Yugoslavia)
SG	13	Ratomir Tvrdić	23 – 14 September 1943	1.85 m (6 ft 1 in)	Jugoplastika	(Socialist Federal Republic of Yugoslavia)
PF	14	Nemanja Đurić	30 – 18 June 1936	1.95 m (6 ft 5 in)	Radnički Belgrade	(Socialist Federal Republic of Yugoslavia)
C	15	Petar Skansi	23 – 23 November 1943	2.06 m (6 ft 9 in)	Jugoplastika	(Socialist Federal Republic of Yugoslavia)

Head coach

- (Socialist Federal Republic of Yugoslavia) Ranko Žeravica

Legend

- Club – describes last
  club before the tournament
- Age – describes age
  on 27 May 1967

=== 1968 Olympic Games ===
Yugoslavia finished 2nd among 16 teams

Yugoslavia men's national basketball team roster
Players
Coaches

Pos.	No.	Name	Age – Date of birth	Height	Club
F	4	Aljoša Zorga	21 – 25 February 1947	2.00 m (6 ft 7 in)	AŠK Olimpija	(Socialist Federal Republic of Yugoslavia)
PF	5	Radivoj Korać	29 – 5 November 1938	1.95 m (6 ft 5 in)	Standard Liège	(Belgium)
F	6	Zoran Marojević	26 – 27 April 1942	2.04 m (6 ft 8 in)	OKK Beograd	(Socialist Federal Republic of Yugoslavia)
C	7	Trajko Rajković	30 – 7 December 1937	2.04 m (6 ft 8 in)	Libertas Livorno	(Italy)
F	8	Vladimir Cvetković	27 – 24 May 1941	1.96 m (6 ft 5 in)	Crvena zvezda	(Socialist Federal Republic of Yugoslavia)
SF	9	Dragoslav Ražnatović	27 – 19 April 1941	1.90 m (6 ft 3 in)	Radnički Belgrade	(Socialist Federal Republic of Yugoslavia)
PG	10	Ivo Daneu	31 – 6 October 1937	1.91 m (6 ft 3 in)	AŠK Olimpija	(Socialist Federal Republic of Yugoslavia)
C	11	Krešimir Ćosić	19 – 26 November 1948	2.11 m (6 ft 11 in)	Zadar	(Socialist Federal Republic of Yugoslavia)
SF	12	Damir Šolman	19 – 7 September 1949	2.00 m (6 ft 7 in)	Mladost Zagreb	(Socialist Federal Republic of Yugoslavia)
PG	13	Nikola Plećaš	20 – 10 January 1948	1.87 m (6 ft 2 in)	Lokomotiva Zagreb	(Socialist Federal Republic of Yugoslavia)
SG	14	Dragutin Čermak	24 – 12 October 1944	1.97 m (6 ft 6 in)	Radnički Belgrade	(Socialist Federal Republic of Yugoslavia)
C	15	Petar Skansi	24 – 23 November 1943	2.06 m (6 ft 9 in)	Jugoplastika	(Socialist Federal Republic of Yugoslavia)

Head coach

- (Socialist Federal Republic of Yugoslavia) Ranko Žeravica

Legend

- Club – describes last
  club before the tournament
- Age – describes age
  on 13 October 1968

=== 1969 EuroBasket ===
Yugoslavia finished 2nd among 12 teams.

Yugoslavia men's national basketball team roster
Players
Coaches

Pos.	No.	Name	Age – Date of birth	Height	Club
SG	4	Ratomir Tvrdić	26 – 14 September 1943	1.85 m (6 ft 1 in)	Jugoplastika	(Socialist Federal Republic of Yugoslavia)
SG	5	Ljubodrag Simonović	20 – 1 January 1949	1.96 m (6 ft 5 in)	Crvena zvezda	(Socialist Federal Republic of Yugoslavia)
F	6	Zoran Marojević	27 – 27 April 1942	2.04 m (6 ft 8 in)	OKK Beograd	(Socialist Federal Republic of Yugoslavia)
C	7	Trajko Rajković	31 – 7 December 1937	2.04 m (6 ft 8 in)	Noalex Venezia	(Italy)
F	8	Vladimir Cvetković	28 – 24 May 1941	1.96 m (6 ft 5 in)	Crvena zvezda	(Socialist Federal Republic of Yugoslavia)
SF	9	Dragan Kapičić	21 – 7 August 1948	1.98 m (6 ft 6 in)	Crvena zvezda	(Socialist Federal Republic of Yugoslavia)
PG	10	Ivo Daneu	31 – 6 October 1937	1.91 m (6 ft 3 in)	AŠK Olimpija	(Socialist Federal Republic of Yugoslavia)
C	11	Krešimir Ćosić	20 – 26 November 1948	2.11 m (6 ft 11 in)	Zadar	(Socialist Federal Republic of Yugoslavia)
SF	12	Damir Šolman	20 – 7 September 1949	2.00 m (6 ft 7 in)	Jugoplastika	(Socialist Federal Republic of Yugoslavia)
PG	13	Nikola Plećaš	21 – 10 January 1948	1.87 m (6 ft 2 in)	Lokomotiva Zagreb	(Socialist Federal Republic of Yugoslavia)
SG	14	Dragutin Čermak	24 – 12 October 1944	1.97 m (6 ft 6 in)	Radnički Belgrade	(Socialist Federal Republic of Yugoslavia)
C	15	Vinko Jelovac	21 – 18 September 1948	2.08 m (6 ft 10 in)	AŠK Olimpija	(Socialist Federal Republic of Yugoslavia)

Head coach

- (Socialist Federal Republic of Yugoslavia) Ranko Žeravica

Legend

- Club – describes last
  club before the tournament
- Age – describes age
  on 27 September 1969

== 1970s ==
=== 1970 World Championship ===
Yugoslavia finished 1st among 13 teams.

Yugoslavia men's national basketball team roster
Players
Coaches

Pos.	No.	Name	Age – Date of birth	Height	Club
SG	4	Ratomir Tvrdić	26 – 14 September 1943	1.85 m (6 ft 1 in)	Jugoplastika	(Socialist Federal Republic of Yugoslavia)
SG	5	Ljubodrag Simonović	21 – 1 January 1949	1.96 m (6 ft 5 in)	Crvena zvezda	(Socialist Federal Republic of Yugoslavia)
C	6	Vinko Jelovac	21 – 18 September 1948	2.08 m (6 ft 10 in)	AŠK Olimpija	(Socialist Federal Republic of Yugoslavia)
C	7	Trajko Rajković	32 – 7 December 1937	2.04 m (6 ft 8 in)	OKK Beograd	(Socialist Federal Republic of Yugoslavia)
F	8	Aljoša Zorga	23 – 25 February 1947	2.00 m (6 ft 7 in)	AŠK Olimpija	(Socialist Federal Republic of Yugoslavia)
SF	9	Dragan Kapičić	21 – 7 August 1948	1.98 m (6 ft 6 in)	Crvena zvezda	(Socialist Federal Republic of Yugoslavia)
PG	10	Ivo Daneu	32 – 6 October 1937	1.91 m (6 ft 3 in)	AŠK Olimpija	(Socialist Federal Republic of Yugoslavia)
C	11	Krešimir Ćosić	21 – 26 November 1948	2.11 m (6 ft 11 in)	BYU	(United States)
SF	12	Damir Šolman	20 – 7 September 1949	2.00 m (6 ft 7 in)	Jugoplastika	(Socialist Federal Republic of Yugoslavia)
PG	13	Nikola Plećaš	22 – 10 January 1948	1.87 m (6 ft 2 in)	Lokomotiva Zagreb	(Socialist Federal Republic of Yugoslavia)
SG	14	Dragutin Čermak	25 – 12 October 1944	1.97 m (6 ft 6 in)	Partizan	(Socialist Federal Republic of Yugoslavia)
C	15	Petar Skansi	26 – 23 November 1943	2.06 m (6 ft 9 in)	Jugoplastika	(Socialist Federal Republic of Yugoslavia)

Head coach

- (Socialist Federal Republic of Yugoslavia) Ranko Žeravica

Assistant coach(es)

- (Socialist Federal Republic of Yugoslavia) Lazar Lečić

Legend

- Club – describes last
  club before the tournament
- Age – describes age
  on 10 May 1970

=== 1971 EuroBasket ===
Yugoslavia finished 2nd among 12 teams.

Yugoslavia men's national basketball team roster
Players
Coaches

Pos.	No.	Name	Age – Date of birth	Height	Club
PG	4	Blagoja Georgievski	20 – 15 October 1950	1.83 m (6 ft 0 in)	Rabotnički	(Socialist Federal Republic of Yugoslavia)
SG	5	Ljubodrag Simonović	22 – 1 January 1949	1.96 m (6 ft 5 in)	Crvena zvezda	(Socialist Federal Republic of Yugoslavia)
C	6	Vinko Jelovac	22 – 18 September 1948	2.08 m (6 ft 10 in)	AŠK Olimpija	(Socialist Federal Republic of Yugoslavia)
C	7	Žarko Knežević	24 – 17 July 1947	2.10 m (6 ft 11 in)	Partizan	(Socialist Federal Republic of Yugoslavia)
F	8	Aljoša Zorga	24 – 25 February 1947	2.00 m (6 ft 7 in)	AŠK Olimpija	(Socialist Federal Republic of Yugoslavia)
SF	9	Dragan Kapičić	23 – 7 August 1948	1.98 m (6 ft 6 in)	Crvena zvezda	(Socialist Federal Republic of Yugoslavia)
PG	10	Borut Bassin	27 – 6 July 1944	1.78 m (5 ft 10 in)	AŠK Olimpija	(Socialist Federal Republic of Yugoslavia)
C	11	Krešimir Ćosić	22 – 26 November 1948	2.11 m (6 ft 11 in)	BYU	(United States)
F/C	12	Dragiša Vučinić	23 – 4 April 1948	2.01 m (6 ft 7 in)	Crvena zvezda	(Socialist Federal Republic of Yugoslavia)
PG	13	Nikola Plećaš	23 – 10 January 1948	1.87 m (6 ft 2 in)	Lokomotiva Zagreb	(Socialist Federal Republic of Yugoslavia)
SG	14	Dragutin Čermak	26 – 12 October 1944	1.90 m (6 ft 3 in)	Partizan	(Socialist Federal Republic of Yugoslavia)
F	15	Davor Rukavina	–	2.04 m (6 ft 8 in)	Lokomotiva Zagreb	(Socialist Federal Republic of Yugoslavia)

Head coach

- (Socialist Federal Republic of Yugoslavia) Ranko Žeravica

Legend

- Club – describes last
  club before the tournament
- Age – describes age
  on 10 September 1971

=== 1972 Olympic Games ===
Yugoslavia finished 5th among 16 teams.

Yugoslavia men's national basketball team roster
Players
Coaches

Pos.	No.	Name	Age – Date of birth	Height	Club
SG	4	Ratomir Tvrdić	28 – 14 September 1943	1.85 m (6 ft 1 in)	Jugoplastika	(Socialist Federal Republic of Yugoslavia)
SG	5	Ljubodrag Simonović	23 – 1 January 1949	1.96 m (6 ft 5 in)	Crvena zvezda	(Socialist Federal Republic of Yugoslavia)
C	6	Vinko Jelovac	23 – 18 September 1948	2.08 m (6 ft 10 in)	AŠK Olimpija	(Socialist Federal Republic of Yugoslavia)
C	7	Žarko Knežević	25 – 17 July 1947	2.10 m (6 ft 11 in)	OKK Beograd	(Socialist Federal Republic of Yugoslavia)
F	8	Miroljub Damjanović	21 – 25 November 1950	2.02 m (6 ft 8 in)	Radnički Belgrade	(Socialist Federal Republic of Yugoslavia)
SF	9	Dragan Kapičić	24 – 7 August 1948	1.98 m (6 ft 6 in)	Crvena zvezda	(Socialist Federal Republic of Yugoslavia)
PG	10	Blagoja Georgievski	21 – 15 October 1950	1.83 m (6 ft 0 in)	Rabotnički	(Socialist Federal Republic of Yugoslavia)
C	11	Krešimir Ćosić	23 – 26 November 1948	2.11 m (6 ft 11 in)	BYU	(United States)
SF	12	Damir Šolman	22 – 7 September 1949	2.00 m (6 ft 7 in)	Jugoplastika	(Socialist Federal Republic of Yugoslavia)
PG	13	Nikola Plećaš	24 – 10 January 1948	1.87 m (6 ft 2 in)	Lokomotiva Zagreb	(Socialist Federal Republic of Yugoslavia)
SG	14	Dragutin Čermak	27 – 12 October 1944	1.97 m (6 ft 6 in)	Partizan	(Socialist Federal Republic of Yugoslavia)
C	15	Milun Marović	24 – 15 September 1947	2.06 m (6 ft 9 in)	Radnički Belgrade	(Socialist Federal Republic of Yugoslavia)

Head coach

- (Socialist Federal Republic of Yugoslavia) Ranko Žeravica

Legend

- Club – describes last
  club before the tournament
- Age – describes age
  on 27 August 1972

=== 1973 EuroBasket ===
Yugoslavia finished 1st among 12 teams.

Yugoslavia men's national basketball team roster
Players
Coaches

Pos.	No.	Name	Age – Date of birth	Height	Club
SG	4	Ratomir Tvrdić	30 – 14 September 1943	1.85 m (6 ft 1 in)	Jugoplastika	(Socialist Federal Republic of Yugoslavia)
SG	5	Dragan Kićanović	20 – 17 August 1953	1.91 m (6 ft 3 in)	Partizan	(Socialist Federal Republic of Yugoslavia)
C	6	Vinko Jelovac	25 – 18 September 1948	2.08 m (6 ft 10 in)	AŠK Olimpija	(Socialist Federal Republic of Yugoslavia)
C	7	Žarko Knežević	26 – 17 July 1947	2.10 m (6 ft 11 in)	Partizan	(Socialist Federal Republic of Yugoslavia)
SF	8	Željko Jerkov	21 – 26 December 1951	2.02 m (6 ft 8 in)	Jugoplastika	(Socialist Federal Republic of Yugoslavia)
G	9	Dragi Ivković	25 – 6 March 1948	1.98 m (6 ft 6 in)	Radnički Belgrade	(Socialist Federal Republic of Yugoslavia)
PG	10	Zoran Slavnić	23 – 26 October 1949	1.80 m (5 ft 11 in)	Crvena zvezda	(Socialist Federal Republic of Yugoslavia)
C	11	Krešimir Ćosić	24 – 26 November 1948	2.11 m (6 ft 11 in)	BYU	(United States)
SF	12	Damir Šolman	24 – 7 September 1949	2.00 m (6 ft 7 in)	Jugoplastika	(Socialist Federal Republic of Yugoslavia)
PG	13	Nikola Plećaš	25 – 10 January 1948	1.87 m (6 ft 2 in)	Lokomotiva Zagreb	(Socialist Federal Republic of Yugoslavia)
F	14	Dražen Dalipagić	21 – 27 November 1951	1.97 m (6 ft 6 in)	Partizan	(Socialist Federal Republic of Yugoslavia)
C	15	Milun Marović	26 – 15 September 1947	2.06 m (6 ft 9 in)	Radnički Belgrade	(Socialist Federal Republic of Yugoslavia)

Head coach

- (Socialist Federal Republic of Yugoslavia) Mirko Novosel

Assistant coach(es)

- (Socialist Federal Republic of Yugoslavia) Branislav Rajačić

Legend

- Club – describes last
  club before the tournament
- Age – describes age
  on 27 September 1973

=== 1974 World Championship ===
Yugoslavia finished 2nd among 14 teams.

Yugoslavia men's national basketball team roster
Players
Coaches

Pos.	No.	Name	Age – Date of birth	Height	Club
SG	4	Ratomir Tvrdić	30 – 14 September 1943	1.85 m (6 ft 1 in)	Jugoplastika	(Socialist Federal Republic of Yugoslavia)
SG	5	Dragan Kićanović	20 – 17 August 1953	1.91 m (6 ft 3 in)	Partizan	(Socialist Federal Republic of Yugoslavia)
C	6	Vinko Jelovac	25 – 18 September 1948	2.08 m (6 ft 10 in)	AŠK Olimpija	(Socialist Federal Republic of Yugoslavia)
C	7	Žarko Knežević	26 – 17 July 1947	2.10 m (6 ft 11 in)	Partizan	(Socialist Federal Republic of Yugoslavia)
SF	8	Željko Jerkov	22 – 26 December 1951	2.02 m (6 ft 8 in)	Jugoplastika	(Socialist Federal Republic of Yugoslavia)
SF	9	Dragan Kapičić	25 – 7 August 1948	1.98 m (6 ft 6 in)	Crvena zvezda	(Socialist Federal Republic of Yugoslavia)
PG	10	Zoran Slavnić	24 – 26 October 1949	1.80 m (5 ft 11 in)	Crvena zvezda	(Socialist Federal Republic of Yugoslavia)
C	11	Krešimir Ćosić	25 – 26 November 1948	2.11 m (6 ft 11 in)	Zadar	(Socialist Federal Republic of Yugoslavia)
SF	12	Damir Šolman	24 – 7 September 1949	2.00 m (6 ft 7 in)	Jugoplastika	(Socialist Federal Republic of Yugoslavia)
PG	13	Nikola Plećaš	26 – 10 January 1948	1.87 m (6 ft 2 in)	Lokomotiva Zagreb	(Socialist Federal Republic of Yugoslavia)
F	14	Dražen Dalipagić	22 – 27 November 1951	1.97 m (6 ft 6 in)	Partizan	(Socialist Federal Republic of Yugoslavia)
C	15	Milun Marović	26 – 15 September 1947	2.06 m (6 ft 9 in)	Radnički Belgrade	(Socialist Federal Republic of Yugoslavia)

Head coach

- (Socialist Federal Republic of Yugoslavia) Mirko Novosel

Assistant coach(es)

- (Socialist Federal Republic of Yugoslavia) Branislav Rajačić

Legend

- Club – describes last
  club before the tournament
- Age – describes age
  on 3 July 1974

=== 1975 EuroBasket ===
Yugoslavia finished 1st among 12 teams.

Yugoslavia men's national basketball team roster
Players
Coaches

Pos.	No.	Name	Age – Date of birth	Height	Club
SG	4	Ratomir Tvrdić	31 – 14 September 1943	1.85 m (6 ft 1 in)	Jugoplastika	(Socialist Federal Republic of Yugoslavia)
SG	5	Dragan Kićanović	21 – 17 August 1953	1.91 m (6 ft 3 in)	Partizan	(Socialist Federal Republic of Yugoslavia)
C	6	Vinko Jelovac	26 – 18 September 1948	2.08 m (6 ft 10 in)	AŠK Olimpija	(Socialist Federal Republic of Yugoslavia)
C	7	Rajko Žižić	20 – 22 January 1955	2.10 m (6 ft 11 in)	OKK Beograd	(Socialist Federal Republic of Yugoslavia)
SF	8	Željko Jerkov	23 – 26 December 1951	2.02 m (6 ft 8 in)	Jugoplastika	(Socialist Federal Republic of Yugoslavia)
	9	Dragan Kapičić	26 – 7 August 1948	1.98 m (6 ft 6 in)	Crvena zvezda	(Socialist Federal Republic of Yugoslavia)
PG	10	Zoran Slavnić	25 – 26 October 1949	1.80 m (5 ft 11 in)	Crvena zvezda	(Socialist Federal Republic of Yugoslavia)
C	11	Krešimir Ćosić	26 – 26 November 1948	2.11 m (6 ft 11 in)	Zadar	(Socialist Federal Republic of Yugoslavia)
SF	12	Damir Šolman	25 – 7 September 1949	2.00 m (6 ft 7 in)	Jugoplastika	(Socialist Federal Republic of Yugoslavia)
PG	13	Nikola Plećaš	27 – 10 January 1948	1.87 m (6 ft 2 in)	Lokomotiva Zagreb	(Socialist Federal Republic of Yugoslavia)
F	14	Dražen Dalipagić	23 – 27 November 1951	1.97 m (6 ft 6 in)	Partizan	(Socialist Federal Republic of Yugoslavia)
SG	15	Mirza Delibašić	21 – 9 January 1954	1.97 m (6 ft 6 in)	Bosna	(Socialist Federal Republic of Yugoslavia)

Head coach

- (Socialist Federal Republic of Yugoslavia) Mirko Novosel

Assistant coach(es)

- (Socialist Federal Republic of Yugoslavia) Branislav Rajačić

Legend

- Club – describes last
  club before the tournament
- Age – describes age
  on 7 June 1975

=== 1976 Olympic Games ===
Yugoslavia finished 2nd among 12 teams.

Yugoslavia men's national basketball team roster
Players
Coaches

Pos.	No.	Name	Age – Date of birth	Height	Club
PG	4	Blagoja Georgievski	25 – 15 October 1950	1.83 m (6 ft 0 in)	Rabotnički	(Socialist Federal Republic of Yugoslavia)
SG	5	Dragan Kićanović	22 – 17 August 1953	1.91 m (6 ft 3 in)	Partizan	(Socialist Federal Republic of Yugoslavia)
C	6	Vinko Jelovac	27 – 18 September 1948	2.08 m (6 ft 10 in)	AŠK Olimpija	(Socialist Federal Republic of Yugoslavia)
C	7	Rajko Žižić	21 – 22 January 1955	2.10 m (6 ft 11 in)	OKK Beograd	(Socialist Federal Republic of Yugoslavia)
SF	8	Željko Jerkov	24 – 26 December 1951	2.02 m (6 ft 8 in)	Jugoplastika	(Socialist Federal Republic of Yugoslavia)
C	9	Andro Knego	19 – 21 October 1956	2.06 m (6 ft 9 in)	Cibona	(Socialist Federal Republic of Yugoslavia)
PG	10	Zoran Slavnić	26 – 26 October 1949	1.80 m (5 ft 11 in)	Crvena zvezda	(Socialist Federal Republic of Yugoslavia)
C	11	Krešimir Ćosić	27 – 26 November 1948	2.11 m (6 ft 11 in)	Zadar	(Socialist Federal Republic of Yugoslavia)
SF	12	Damir Šolman	26 – 7 September 1949	2.00 m (6 ft 7 in)	Jugoplastika	(Socialist Federal Republic of Yugoslavia)
SF	13	Žarko Varajić	24 – 26 December 1951	2.02 m (6 ft 8 in)	Bosna	(Socialist Federal Republic of Yugoslavia)
F	14	Dražen Dalipagić	24 – 27 November 1951	1.97 m (6 ft 6 in)	Partizan	(Socialist Federal Republic of Yugoslavia)
SG	15	Mirza Delibašić	22 – 9 January 1954	1.97 m (6 ft 6 in)	Bosna	(Socialist Federal Republic of Yugoslavia)

Head coach

- (Socialist Federal Republic of Yugoslavia) Mirko Novosel

Assistant coach(es)

- (Socialist Federal Republic of Yugoslavia) Branislav Rajačić

Legend

- Club – describes last
  club before the tournament
- Age – describes age
  on 18 July 1976

=== 1977 EuroBasket ===
Yugoslavia finished 1st among 12 teams.

Yugoslavia men's national basketball team roster
Players
Coaches

Pos.	No.	Name	Age – Date of birth	Height	Club
	4	Joško Papić	–		Brest Olimpija	(Socialist Federal Republic of Yugoslavia)
SG	5	Dragan Kićanović	24 – 17 August 1953	1.91 m (6 ft 3 in)	Partizan	(Socialist Federal Republic of Yugoslavia)
C	6	Vinko Jelovac	28 – 18 September 1948	2.08 m (6 ft 10 in)	Brest Olimpija	(Socialist Federal Republic of Yugoslavia)
PF	7	Duje Krstulović	24 – 5 February 1953	2.03 m (6 ft 8 in)	Jugoplastika	(Socialist Federal Republic of Yugoslavia)
SF	8	Željko Jerkov	25 – 26 December 1951	2.02 m (6 ft 8 in)	Jugoplastika	(Socialist Federal Republic of Yugoslavia)
	9	Anto Đogić	25 – 18 April 1952		Bosna	(Socialist Federal Republic of Yugoslavia)
PG	10	Zoran Slavnić	27 – 26 October 1949	1.80 m (5 ft 11 in)	Crvena zvezda	(Socialist Federal Republic of Yugoslavia)
C	11	Krešimir Ćosić	28 – 26 November 1948	2.11 m (6 ft 11 in)	Brest Olimpija	(Socialist Federal Republic of Yugoslavia)
C	12	Ratko Radovanović	20 – 16 October 1956	2.08 m (6 ft 10 in)	Bosna	(Socialist Federal Republic of Yugoslavia)
SF	13	Žarko Varajić	25 – 26 December 1951	2.02 m (6 ft 8 in)	Bosna	(Socialist Federal Republic of Yugoslavia)
F	14	Dražen Dalipagić	25 – 27 November 1951	1.97 m (6 ft 6 in)	Partizan	(Socialist Federal Republic of Yugoslavia)
SG	15	Mirza Delibašić	23 – 9 January 1954	1.97 m (6 ft 6 in)	Bosna	(Socialist Federal Republic of Yugoslavia)

Head coach

- (Socialist Federal Republic of Yugoslavia) Aleksandar Nikolić

Assistant coach(es)

- (Socialist Federal Republic of Yugoslavia) Bogdan Tanjević

Legend

- Club – describes last
  club before the tournament
- Age – describes age
  on 14 September 1977

=== 1978 World Championship ===
Yugoslavia finished 1st among 14 teams.

Yugoslavia men's national basketball team roster
Players
Coaches

Pos.	No.	Name	Age – Date of birth	Height	Club
PG	4	Peter Vilfan	21 – 29 June 1957	1.90 m (6 ft 3 in)	Jugoplastika	(Socialist Federal Republic of Yugoslavia)
SG	5	Dragan Kićanović	25 – 17 August 1953	1.91 m (6 ft 3 in)	Partizan	(Socialist Federal Republic of Yugoslavia)
C	6	Rajko Žižić	23 – 22 January 1955	2.10 m (6 ft 11 in)	OKK Beograd	(Socialist Federal Republic of Yugoslavia)
C	7	Andro Knego	21 – 21 October 1956	2.06 m (6 ft 9 in)	Cibona	(Socialist Federal Republic of Yugoslavia)
C	8	Željko Jerkov	24 – 6 November 1953	2.08 m (6 ft 10 in)	Jugoplastika	(Socialist Federal Republic of Yugoslavia)
SG	9	Branko Skroče	23 – 17 May 1955	1.95 m (6 ft 5 in)	Zadar	(Socialist Federal Republic of Yugoslavia)
PG	10	Zoran Slavnić	28 – 26 October 1949	1.80 m (5 ft 11 in)	Joventut Badalona	(Spain)
C	11	Krešimir Ćosić	29 – 26 November 1948	2.11 m (6 ft 11 in)	Brest Olimpija	(Socialist Federal Republic of Yugoslavia)
C	12	Ratko Radovanović	21 – 16 October 1956	2.08 m (6 ft 10 in)	Bosna	(Socialist Federal Republic of Yugoslavia)
PF	13	Duje Krstulović	25 – 5 February 1953	2.03 m (6 ft 8 in)	Jugoplastika	(Socialist Federal Republic of Yugoslavia)
F	14	Dražen Dalipagić	26 – 27 November 1951	1.97 m (6 ft 6 in)	Partizan	(Socialist Federal Republic of Yugoslavia)
SG	15	Mirza Delibašić	24 – 9 January 1954	1.97 m (6 ft 6 in)	Bosna	(Socialist Federal Republic of Yugoslavia)

Head coach

- (Socialist Federal Republic of Yugoslavia) Aleksandar Nikolić

Assistant coach(es)

- (Socialist Federal Republic of Yugoslavia) Bogdan Tanjević

Legend

- Club – describes last
  club before the tournament
- Age – describes age
  on 1 October 1978

=== 1979 EuroBasket ===
Yugoslavia finished 3rd among 12 teams.

Yugoslavia men's national basketball team roster
Players
Coaches

Pos.	No.	Name	Age – Date of birth	Height	Club
PG	4	Peter Vilfan	21 – 29 June 1957	1.90 m (6 ft 3 in)	Jugoplastika	(Socialist Federal Republic of Yugoslavia)
SG	5	Dragan Kićanović	25 – 17 August 1953	1.91 m (6 ft 3 in)	Partizan	(Socialist Federal Republic of Yugoslavia)
C	6	Rajko Žižić	24 – 22 January 1955	2.10 m (6 ft 11 in)	OKK Beograd	(Socialist Federal Republic of Yugoslavia)
SF	7	Žarko Varajić	27 – 26 December 1951	2.02 m (6 ft 8 in)	Bosna	(Socialist Federal Republic of Yugoslavia)
C	8	Željko Jerkov	25 – 6 November 1953	2.08 m (6 ft 10 in)	Jugoplastika	(Socialist Federal Republic of Yugoslavia)
SF	9	Mihovil Nakić	23 – 31 July 1955	2.04 m (6 ft 8 in)	Cibona	(Socialist Federal Republic of Yugoslavia)
PG	10	Zoran Slavnić	29 – 26 October 1949	1.80 m (5 ft 11 in)	Joventut Badalona	(Spain)
C	11	Krešimir Ćosić	30 – 26 November 1948	2.11 m (6 ft 11 in)	Sinudyne Bologna	(Italy)
C	12	Ratko Radovanović	22 – 16 October 1956	2.08 m (6 ft 10 in)	Bosna	(Socialist Federal Republic of Yugoslavia)
PF	13	Duje Krstulović	26 – 5 February 1953	2.03 m (6 ft 8 in)	Jugoplastika	(Socialist Federal Republic of Yugoslavia)
F	14	Dražen Dalipagić	27 – 27 November 1951	1.97 m (6 ft 6 in)	Partizan	(Socialist Federal Republic of Yugoslavia)
SG	15	Mirza Delibašić	25 – 9 January 1954	1.97 m (6 ft 6 in)	Bosna	(Socialist Federal Republic of Yugoslavia)

Head coach

- (Socialist Federal Republic of Yugoslavia) Petar Skansi

Assistant coach(es)

- (Socialist Federal Republic of Yugoslavia) Bogdan Tanjević

Legend

- Club – describes last
  club before the tournament
- Age – describes age
  on 9 June 1979

== 1980s ==
=== 1980 Olympic Games ===
Yugoslavia finished 1st among 12 teams.

Yugoslavia men's national basketball team roster
Players
Coaches

Pos.	No.	Name	Age – Date of birth	Height	Club
F/C	4	Andro Knego	23 – 21 October 1956	2.06 m (6 ft 9 in)	Cibona	(Socialist Federal Republic of Yugoslavia)
SG	5	Dragan Kićanović	26 – 17 August 1953	1.91 m (6 ft 3 in)	Partizan	(Socialist Federal Republic of Yugoslavia)
C	6	Rajko Žižić	25 – 22 January 1955	2.10 m (6 ft 11 in)	OKK Beograd	(Socialist Federal Republic of Yugoslavia)
SF	7	Mihovil Nakić	24 – 31 July 1955	2.04 m (6 ft 8 in)	Cibona	(Socialist Federal Republic of Yugoslavia)
C	8	Željko Jerkov	26 – 6 November 1953	2.08 m (6 ft 10 in)	Jugoplastika	(Socialist Federal Republic of Yugoslavia)
SG	9	Branko Skroče	25 – 17 May 1955	1.95 m (6 ft 5 in)	Zadar	(Socialist Federal Republic of Yugoslavia)
PG	10	Zoran Slavnić	30 – 26 October 1949	1.80 m (5 ft 11 in)	Šibenka	(Socialist Federal Republic of Yugoslavia)
C	11	Krešimir Ćosić	31 – 26 November 1948	2.11 m (6 ft 11 in)	Sinudyne Bologna	(Italy)
C	12	Ratko Radovanović	23 – 16 October 1956	2.08 m (6 ft 10 in)	Bosna	(Socialist Federal Republic of Yugoslavia)
PF	13	Duje Krstulović	27 – 5 February 1953	2.03 m (6 ft 8 in)	Jugoplastika	(Socialist Federal Republic of Yugoslavia)
F	14	Dražen Dalipagić	28 – 27 November 1951	1.97 m (6 ft 6 in)	Partizan	(Socialist Federal Republic of Yugoslavia)
SG	15	Mirza Delibašić	26 – 9 January 1954	1.97 m (6 ft 6 in)	Bosna	(Socialist Federal Republic of Yugoslavia)

Head coach

- (Socialist Federal Republic of Yugoslavia) Ranko Žeravica

Assistant coach(es)

- (Socialist Federal Republic of Yugoslavia) Bogdan Tanjević
- (Socialist Federal Republic of Yugoslavia) Mirko Novosel

Legend

- Club – describes last
  club before the tournament
- Age – describes age
  on 20 July 1980

=== 1981 EuroBasket ===
Yugoslavia finished 2nd among 12 teams.

Yugoslavia men's national basketball team roster
Players
Coaches

Pos.	No.	Name	Age – Date of birth	Height	Club
G	4	Petar Popović	21 – 13 July 1959		Zadar	(Socialist Federal Republic of Yugoslavia)
SG	5	Dragan Kićanović	27 – 17 August 1953	1.91 m (6 ft 3 in)	Partizan	(Socialist Federal Republic of Yugoslavia)
PF	6	Predrag Benaček	22 – 29 March 1959	2.06 m (6 ft 9 in)	Bosna	(Socialist Federal Republic of Yugoslavia)
PF	7	Željko Poljak	22 – 29 April 1959	2.05 m (6 ft 9 in)	Kvarner	(Socialist Federal Republic of Yugoslavia)
SF	8	Boban Petrović	23 – 19 July 1957	2.05 m (6 ft 9 in)	Partizan	(Socialist Federal Republic of Yugoslavia)
SG	9	Branko Skroče	26 – 17 May 1955	1.95 m (6 ft 5 in)	Zadar	(Socialist Federal Republic of Yugoslavia)
PG	10	Peter Vilfan	23 – 29 June 1957	1.90 m (6 ft 3 in)	Iskra Olimpija	(Socialist Federal Republic of Yugoslavia)
C	11	Krešimir Ćosić	32 – 26 November 1948	2.11 m (6 ft 11 in)	Cibona	(Socialist Federal Republic of Yugoslavia)
C	12	Ratko Radovanović	24 – 16 October 1956	2.08 m (6 ft 10 in)	Bosna	(Socialist Federal Republic of Yugoslavia)
C	13	Andro Knego	24 – 21 October 1956	2.06 m (6 ft 9 in)	Cibona	(Socialist Federal Republic of Yugoslavia)
SF	14	Dražen Dalipagić	29 – 27 November 1951	1.97 m (6 ft 6 in)	Carrera Venezia	(Italy)
SG	15	Mirza Delibašić	27 – 9 January 1954	1.97 m (6 ft 6 in)	Real Madrid	(Spain)

Head coach

- (Socialist Federal Republic of Yugoslavia) Bogdan Tanjević

Legend

- Club – describes last
  club before the tournament
- Age – describes age
  on 26 May 1981

=== 1982 World Championship ===
Yugoslavia finished 3rd among 13 teams.

Yugoslavia men's national basketball team roster
Players
Coaches

Pos.	No.	Name	Age – Date of birth	Height	Club
PG	4	Aleksandar Petrović	23 – 16 February 1959	1.94 m (6 ft 4 in)	Cibona	(Socialist Federal Republic of Yugoslavia)
SG	5	Dragan Kićanović	28 – 17 August 1953	1.91 m (6 ft 3 in)	Scavolini Pesaro	(Italy)
PG	6	Zoran Radović	21 – 17 February 1961	1.91 m (6 ft 3 in)	Crvena zvezda	(Socialist Federal Republic of Yugoslavia)
C	7	Rajko Žižić	27 – 22 January 1955	2.10 m (6 ft 11 in)	Crvena zvezda	(Socialist Federal Republic of Yugoslavia)
C	8	Željko Jerkov	28 – 6 November 1953	2.08 m (6 ft 10 in)	Jugoplastika	(Socialist Federal Republic of Yugoslavia)
PF	9	Zufer Avdija	22 – 1 October 1959	2.03 m (6 ft 8 in)	Crvena zvezda	(Socialist Federal Republic of Yugoslavia)
PG	10	Peter Vilfan	25 – 29 June 1957	1.90 m (6 ft 3 in)	Iskra Olimpija	(Socialist Federal Republic of Yugoslavia)
C	11	Andro Knego	25 – 21 October 1956	2.06 m (6 ft 9 in)	Cibona	(Socialist Federal Republic of Yugoslavia)
C	12	Ratko Radovanović	25 – 16 October 1956	2.08 m (6 ft 10 in)	Bosna	(Socialist Federal Republic of Yugoslavia)
SF	13	Boban Petrović	25 – 19 July 1957	2.05 m (6 ft 9 in)	Partizan	(Socialist Federal Republic of Yugoslavia)
F	14	Dražen Dalipagić	30 – 27 November 1951	1.97 m (6 ft 6 in)	Partizan	(Socialist Federal Republic of Yugoslavia)
SG	15	Mirza Delibašić	28 – 9 January 1954	1.97 m (6 ft 6 in)	Real Madrid	(Spain)

Head coach

- (Socialist Federal Republic of Yugoslavia) Ranko Žeravica

Assistant coach(es)

- (Socialist Federal Republic of Yugoslavia) Luka Stančić

Legend

- Club – describes last
  club before the tournament
- Age – describes age
  on 15 August 1982

=== 1983 EuroBasket ===
Yugoslavia finished 7th among 12 teams.

Yugoslavia men's national basketball team roster
Players
Coaches

Pos.	No.	Name	Age – Date of birth	Height	Club
G	4	Dražen Petrović	18 – 22 October 1964	1.96 m (6 ft 5 in)	Šibenka	(Socialist Federal Republic of Yugoslavia)
G	5	Dragan Kićanović	29 – 17 August 1953	1.91 m (6 ft 3 in)	Scavolini Pesaro	(Italy)
F	6	Goran Grbović	22 – 9 February 1961	2.02 m (6 ft 8 in)	Partizan	(Socialist Federal Republic of Yugoslavia)
C	7	Rajko Žižić	28 – 22 January 1955	2.10 m (6 ft 11 in)	Crvena zvezda	(Socialist Federal Republic of Yugoslavia)
F	8	Ivan Sunara	24 – 27 March 1959	2.03 m (6 ft 8 in)	Zadar	(Socialist Federal Republic of Yugoslavia)
PF	9	Željko Poljak	24 – 29 April 1959	2.05 m (6 ft 9 in)	Jugoplastika	(Socialist Federal Republic of Yugoslavia)
PG	10	Zoran Slavnić	33 – 26 October 1949	1.80 m (5 ft 11 in)	Indesit Caserta	(Italy)
C	11	Krešimir Ćosić	34 – 26 November 1948	2.11 m (6 ft 11 in)	Cibona	(Socialist Federal Republic of Yugoslavia)
C	12	Ratko Radovanović	26 – 16 October 1956	2.08 m (6 ft 10 in)	Bosna	(Socialist Federal Republic of Yugoslavia)
PG	13	Peter Vilfan	25 – 29 June 1957	1.90 m (6 ft 3 in)	ZZI Olimpija	(Socialist Federal Republic of Yugoslavia)
F	14	Dražen Dalipagić	31 – 27 November 1951	1.97 m (6 ft 6 in)	Real Madrid	(Spain)
C	15	Milenko Savović	22 – 19 July 1960	2.10 m (6 ft 11 in)	Partizan	(Socialist Federal Republic of Yugoslavia)

Head coach

- (Socialist Federal Republic of Yugoslavia) Josip Gjergja

Legend

- Club – describes last
  club before the tournament
- Age – describes age
  on 26 May 1983

=== 1984 Olympic Games ===
Yugoslavia finished 3rd among 12 teams.

Yugoslavia men's national basketball team roster
Players
Coaches

Pos.	No.	Name	Age – Date of birth	Height	Club
SG	4	Dražen Petrović	19 – 22 October 1964	1.96 m (6 ft 5 in)	Cibona	(Socialist Federal Republic of Yugoslavia)
PG	5	Aleksandar Petrović	25 – 16 February 1959	1.94 m (6 ft 4 in)	Cibona	(Socialist Federal Republic of Yugoslavia)
PG	6	Nebojša Zorkić	22 – 21 August 1961	1.88 m (6 ft 2 in)	Partizan	(Socialist Federal Republic of Yugoslavia)
C	7	Rajko Žižić	29 – 22 January 1955	2.10 m (6 ft 11 in)	Crvena zvezda	(Socialist Federal Republic of Yugoslavia)
SF	8	Ivan Sunara	25 – 27 March 1959	2.03 m (6 ft 8 in)	Zadar	(Socialist Federal Republic of Yugoslavia)
SF	9	Emir Mutapčić	24 – 26 May 1960	1.98 m (6 ft 6 in)	Bosna	(Socialist Federal Republic of Yugoslavia)
PG	10	Sabit Hadžić	26 – 7 August 1957	1.88 m (6 ft 2 in)	Bosna	(Socialist Federal Republic of Yugoslavia)
C	11	Andro Knego	27 – 21 October 1956	2.06 m (6 ft 9 in)	Cibona	(Socialist Federal Republic of Yugoslavia)
C	12	Ratko Radovanović	27 – 16 October 1956	2.08 m (6 ft 10 in)	Bosna	(Socialist Federal Republic of Yugoslavia)
SF	13	Mihovil Nakić	28 – 31 July 1955	2.04 m (6 ft 8 in)	Cibona	(Socialist Federal Republic of Yugoslavia)
F	14	Dražen Dalipagić	32 – 27 November 1951	1.97 m (6 ft 6 in)	Gedeco Udine	(Italy)
C	15	Branko Vukičević	22 – 18 December 1961	2.12 m (6 ft 11 in)	Cibona	(Socialist Federal Republic of Yugoslavia)

Head coach

- (Socialist Federal Republic of Yugoslavia) Mirko Novosel

Legend

- Club – describes last
  club before the tournament
- Age – describes age
  on 29 July 1984

=== 1985 EuroBasket ===
Yugoslavia finished 7th among 12 teams.

Yugoslavia men's national basketball team roster
Players
Coaches

Pos.	No.	Name	Age – Date of birth	Height	Club
G	4	Dražen Petrović	20 – 22 October 1964	1.96 m (6 ft 5 in)	Cibona	(Socialist Federal Republic of Yugoslavia)
PG	5	Nebojša Zorkić	23 – 21 August 1961	1.88 m (6 ft 2 in)	Partizan	(Socialist Federal Republic of Yugoslavia)
F	6	Zoran Čutura	23 – 12 March 1962	2.02 m (6 ft 8 in)	Cibona	(Socialist Federal Republic of Yugoslavia)
C	7	Stojko Vranković	21 – 22 January 1964	2.18 m (7 ft 2 in)	Zadar	(Socialist Federal Republic of Yugoslavia)
F	8	Ivan Sunara	26 – 27 March 1959	2.03 m (6 ft 8 in)	Zadar	(Socialist Federal Republic of Yugoslavia)
F	9	Emir Mutapčić	25 – 27 May 1960	1.97 m (6 ft 6 in)	Bosna	(Socialist Federal Republic of Yugoslavia)
PG	10	Zoran Radović	24 – 17 February 1961	1.91 m (6 ft 3 in)	Crvena zvezda	(Socialist Federal Republic of Yugoslavia)
C	11	Andro Knego	28 – 21 October 1956	2.06 m (6 ft 9 in)	Cibona	(Socialist Federal Republic of Yugoslavia)
F	12	Sven Ušić	25 – 19 August 1959	2.01 m (6 ft 7 in)	Cibona	(Socialist Federal Republic of Yugoslavia)
PF	13	Mihovil Nakić	29 – 31 July 1955	2.04 m (6 ft 8 in)	Cibona	(Socialist Federal Republic of Yugoslavia)
F	14	Borislav Vučević	26 – 29 August 1958	2.01 m (6 ft 7 in)	Bosna	(Socialist Federal Republic of Yugoslavia)
SF	15	Boban Petrović	27 – 19 July 1957	2.05 m (6 ft 9 in)	Partizan	(Socialist Federal Republic of Yugoslavia)

Head coach

- (Socialist Federal Republic of Yugoslavia) Krešimir Ćosić

Assistant coach(es)

- (Socialist Federal Republic of Yugoslavia) Vlade Đurović

Legend

- Club – describes last
  club before the tournament
- Age – describes age
  on 5 June 1985

=== 1986 World Championship ===
Yugoslavia finished 3rd among 24 teams.

Yugoslavia men's national basketball team roster
Players
Coaches

Pos.	No.	Name	Age – Date of birth	Height	Club
SG	4	Dražen Petrović	21 – 22 October 1964	1.96 m (6 ft 5 in)	Cibona	(Socialist Federal Republic of Yugoslavia)
PG	5	Aleksandar Petrović	27 – 16 February 1959	1.94 m (6 ft 4 in)	Cibona	(Socialist Federal Republic of Yugoslavia)
C	6	Vlade Divac	18 – 3 February 1968	2.16 m (7 ft 1 in)	Sloga	(Socialist Federal Republic of Yugoslavia)
SF	7	Zoran Čutura	24 – 13 March 1962	2.02 m (6 ft 8 in)	Cibona	(Socialist Federal Republic of Yugoslavia)
F	8	Veljko Petranović	26 – 24 August 1959	2.04 m (6 ft 8 in)	Zadar	(Socialist Federal Republic of Yugoslavia)
SF	9	Emir Mutapčić	26 – 26 May 1960	1.98 m (6 ft 6 in)	Bosna	(Socialist Federal Republic of Yugoslavia)
PG	10	Zoran Radović	25 – 17 February 1961	1.91 m (6 ft 3 in)	Crvena zvezda	(Socialist Federal Republic of Yugoslavia)
C	11	Stojko Vranković	22 – 22 January 1964	2.18 m (7 ft 2 in)	Zadar	(Socialist Federal Republic of Yugoslavia)
C	12	Ratko Radovanović	29 – 16 October 1956	2.08 m (6 ft 10 in)	Stade Français	(France)
C	13	Franjo Arapović	23 – 2 June 1965	2.15 m (7 ft 1 in)	Cibona	(Socialist Federal Republic of Yugoslavia)
SF	14	Dražen Dalipagić	34 – 27 November 1951	2.02 m (6 ft 8 in)	Giomo Venezia	(Italy)
F	15	Danko Cvjetićanin	22 – 16 October 1963	1.98 m (6 ft 6 in)	Cibona	(Socialist Federal Republic of Yugoslavia)

Head coach

- (Socialist Federal Republic of Yugoslavia) Krešimir Ćosić

Assistant coach(es)

- (Socialist Federal Republic of Yugoslavia) Dušan Ivković

Legend

- Club – describes last
  club before the tournament
- Age – describes age
  on 5 July 1986

=== 1987 EuroBasket ===
Yugoslavia finished 3rd among 12 teams.

Yugoslavia men's national basketball team roster
Players
Coaches

Pos.	No.	Name	Age – Date of birth	Height	Club
SG	4	Dražen Petrović	22 – 22 October 1964	1.96 m (6 ft 5 in)	Cibona	(Socialist Federal Republic of Yugoslavia)
PG	5	Aleksandar Petrović	28 – 16 February 1959	1.94 m (6 ft 4 in)	Cibona	(Socialist Federal Republic of Yugoslavia)
PG	6	Aleksandar Đorđević	19 – 26 August 1967	1.88 m (6 ft 2 in)	Partizan	(Socialist Federal Republic of Yugoslavia)
F	7	Toni Kukoč	18 – 18 September 1968	2.11 m (6 ft 11 in)	Jugoplastika	(Socialist Federal Republic of Yugoslavia)
PF	8	Žarko Paspalj	21 – 27 March 1966	2.08 m (6 ft 10 in)	Partizan	(Socialist Federal Republic of Yugoslavia)
SF	9	Goran Grbović	26 – 9 February 1961	2.02 m (6 ft 8 in)	Partizan	(Socialist Federal Republic of Yugoslavia)
PG	10	Zoran Radović	26 – 17 February 1961	1.91 m (6 ft 3 in)	Crvena zvezda	(Socialist Federal Republic of Yugoslavia)
C	11	Stojko Vranković	23 – 22 January 1964	2.18 m (7 ft 2 in)	Zadar	(Socialist Federal Republic of Yugoslavia)
C	12	Ratko Radovanović	30 – 16 October 1956	2.08 m (6 ft 10 in)	Hitachi Venezia	(Italy)
C	13	Vlade Divac	19 – 3 February 1968	2.16 m (7 ft 1 in)	Partizan	(Socialist Federal Republic of Yugoslavia)
C	14	Dino Rađa	20 – 24 April 1967	2.11 m (6 ft 11 in)	Jugoplastika	(Socialist Federal Republic of Yugoslavia)
F	15	Danko Cvjetićanin	23 – 16 October 1963	1.98 m (6 ft 6 in)	Cibona	(Socialist Federal Republic of Yugoslavia)

Head coach

- (Socialist Federal Republic of Yugoslavia) Krešimir Ćosić

Assistant coach(es)

- (Socialist Federal Republic of Yugoslavia) Dušan Ivković
- (Socialist Federal Republic of Yugoslavia) Zoran Slavnić

Legend

- Club – describes last
  club before the tournament
- Age – describes age
  on 3 June 1987

=== 1988 Olympic Games ===
Yugoslavia finished 2nd among 12 teams.

Yugoslavia men's national basketball team roster
Players
Coaches

Pos.	No.	Name	Age – Date of birth	Height	Club
SG	4	Dražen Petrović	23 – 22 October 1964	1.96 m (6 ft 5 in)	Cibona	(Socialist Federal Republic of Yugoslavia)
SG	5	Zdravko Radulović	21 – 12 December 1966	1.91 m (6 ft 3 in)	Bosna	(Socialist Federal Republic of Yugoslavia)
SF	6	Zoran Čutura	26 – 13 March 1962	2.02 m (6 ft 8 in)	Cibona	(Socialist Federal Republic of Yugoslavia)
F	7	Toni Kukoč	19 – 18 September 1968	2.11 m (6 ft 11 in)	Jugoplastika	(Socialist Federal Republic of Yugoslavia)
PF	8	Žarko Paspalj	22 – 27 March 1966	2.08 m (6 ft 10 in)	Partizan	(Socialist Federal Republic of Yugoslavia)
PG	9	Željko Obradović	28 – 9 March 1960	1.80 m (5 ft 11 in)	Partizan	(Socialist Federal Republic of Yugoslavia)
PG	10	Jure Zdovc	21 – 13 December 1966	1.98 m (6 ft 6 in)	Smelt Olimpija	(Socialist Federal Republic of Yugoslavia)
C	11	Stojko Vranković	24 – 22 January 1964	2.18 m (7 ft 2 in)	Zadar	(Socialist Federal Republic of Yugoslavia)
C	12	Vlade Divac	20 – 3 February 1968	2.16 m (7 ft 1 in)	Partizan	(Socialist Federal Republic of Yugoslavia)
C	13	Dino Rađa	21 – 24 April 1967	2.11 m (6 ft 11 in)	Jugoplastika	(Socialist Federal Republic of Yugoslavia)
C	14	Franjo Arapović	23 – 2 June 1965	2.15 m (7 ft 1 in)	Cibona	(Socialist Federal Republic of Yugoslavia)
F	15	Danko Cvjetićanin	24 – 16 October 1963	1.98 m (6 ft 6 in)	Cibona	(Socialist Federal Republic of Yugoslavia)

Head coach

- (Socialist Federal Republic of Yugoslavia) Dušan Ivković

Assistant coach(es)

- (Socialist Federal Republic of Yugoslavia) Milan Minić

Legend

- Club – describes last
  club before the tournament
- Age – describes age
  on 17 September 1988

=== 1989 EuroBasket ===
Yugoslavia finished 1st among 8 teams.

Yugoslavia men's national basketball team roster
Players
Coaches

Pos.	No.	Name	Age – Date of birth	Height	Club
SG	4	Dražen Petrović	24 – 22 October 1964	1.96 m (6 ft 5 in)	Real Madrid	(Spain)
SG	5	Zdravko Radulović	22 – 12 December 1966	1.91 m (6 ft 3 in)	Bosna	(Socialist Federal Republic of Yugoslavia)
SF	6	Zoran Čutura	27 – 13 March 1962	2.02 m (6 ft 8 in)	Cibona	(Socialist Federal Republic of Yugoslavia)
F	7	Toni Kukoč	20 – 18 September 1968	2.11 m (6 ft 11 in)	Jugoplastika	(Socialist Federal Republic of Yugoslavia)
PF	8	Žarko Paspalj	23 – 27 March 1966	2.08 m (6 ft 10 in)	Partizan	(Socialist Federal Republic of Yugoslavia)
PG	9	Jure Zdovc	22 – 13 December 1966	1.98 m (6 ft 6 in)	Smelt Olimpija	(Socialist Federal Republic of Yugoslavia)
PG	10	Zoran Radović	28 – 17 February 1961	1.91 m (6 ft 3 in)	Crvena zvezda	(Socialist Federal Republic of Yugoslavia)
C	11	Stojko Vranković	25 – 22 January 1964	2.18 m (7 ft 2 in)	Zadar	(Socialist Federal Republic of Yugoslavia)
C	12	Vlade Divac	21 – 3 February 1968	2.16 m (7 ft 1 in)	Partizan	(Socialist Federal Republic of Yugoslavia)
SG	13	Predrag Danilović	19 – 26 February 1970	2.01 m (6 ft 7 in)	Partizan	(Socialist Federal Republic of Yugoslavia)
C	14	Dino Rađa	22 – 24 April 1967	2.11 m (6 ft 11 in)	Jugoplastika	(Socialist Federal Republic of Yugoslavia)
PF	15	Mario Primorac	27 – 3 October 1961	2.04 m (6 ft 8 in)	Bosna	(Socialist Federal Republic of Yugoslavia)

Head coach

- (Socialist Federal Republic of Yugoslavia) Dušan Ivković

Legend

- Club – describes last
  club before the tournament
- Age – describes age
  on 20 June 1989

== 1990s ==
=== 1990 World Championship ===
Yugoslavia finished 1st among 16 teams.

Yugoslavia men's national basketball team roster
Players
Coaches

Pos.	No.	Name	Age – Date of birth	Height	Club
SG	4	Dražen Petrović	25 – 22 October 1964	1.96 m (6 ft 5 in)	Portland Trail Blazers	(United States)
SG	5	Velimir Perasović	25 – 9 February 1965	1.96 m (6 ft 5 in)	Jugoplastika	(Socialist Federal Republic of Yugoslavia)
SF	6	Zoran Čutura	28 – 13 March 1962	2.02 m (6 ft 8 in)	Cibona	(Socialist Federal Republic of Yugoslavia)
F	7	Toni Kukoč	21 – 18 September 1968	2.11 m (6 ft 11 in)	Jugoplastika	(Socialist Federal Republic of Yugoslavia)
PF	8	Žarko Paspalj	24 – 27 March 1966	2.08 m (6 ft 10 in)	San Antonio Spurs	(United States)
PG	9	Jure Zdovc	23 – 13 December 1966	1.98 m (6 ft 6 in)	Smelt Olimpija	(Socialist Federal Republic of Yugoslavia)
PG	10	Željko Obradović	30 – 9 March 1960	1.80 m (5 ft 11 in)	Partizan	(Socialist Federal Republic of Yugoslavia)
C	11	Radisav Ćurčić	24 – 26 September 1965	2.06 m (6 ft 9 in)	Smelt Olimpija	(Socialist Federal Republic of Yugoslavia)
C	12	Vlade Divac	22 – 3 February 1968	2.16 m (7 ft 1 in)	Los Angeles Lakers	(United States)
SF	13	Arijan Komazec	20 – 23 January 1970	2.01 m (6 ft 7 in)	Zadar	(Socialist Federal Republic of Yugoslavia)
C	14	Zoran Jovanović	25 – 25 May 1965	2.12 m (6 ft 11 in)	Crvena zvezda	(Socialist Federal Republic of Yugoslavia)
C	15	Zoran Savić	23 – 18 November 1966	2.06 m (6 ft 9 in)	Jugoplastika	(Socialist Federal Republic of Yugoslavia)

Head coach

- (Socialist Federal Republic of Yugoslavia) Dušan Ivković

Assistant coach(es)

- (Socialist Federal Republic of Yugoslavia) Dragan Šakota

Legend

- Club – describes last
  club before the tournament
- Age – describes age
  on 8 August 1990

=== 1991 EuroBasket ===
Yugoslavia finished 1st among 8 teams.

Yugoslavia men's national basketball team roster
Players
Coaches

Pos.	No.	Name	Age – Date of birth	Height	Club
PG	4	Zoran Sretenović	26 – 5 August 1964	1.91 m (6 ft 3 in)	POP 84	(Socialist Federal Republic of Yugoslavia)
SG	5	Velimir Perasović	26 – 9 February 1965	1.96 m (6 ft 5 in)	POP 84	(Socialist Federal Republic of Yugoslavia)
PG	6	Aleksandar Đorđević	23 – 26 August 1967	1.88 m (6 ft 2 in)	Partizan	(Socialist Federal Republic of Yugoslavia)
F	7	Toni Kukoč	22 – 18 September 1968	2.11 m (6 ft 11 in)	POP 84	(Socialist Federal Republic of Yugoslavia)
PF	8	Žarko Paspalj	25 – 27 March 1966	2.08 m (6 ft 10 in)	Partizan	(Socialist Federal Republic of Yugoslavia)
PG	9	Jure Zdovc	24 – 13 December 1966	1.98 m (6 ft 6 in)	Smelt Olimpija	(Socialist Federal Republic of Yugoslavia)
SG	10	Predrag Danilović	21 – 26 February 1970	2.01 m (6 ft 7 in)	Partizan	(Socialist Federal Republic of Yugoslavia)
C	11	Zoran Jovanović	26 – 25 May 1965	2.12 m (6 ft 11 in)	Crvena zvezda	(Socialist Federal Republic of Yugoslavia)
C	12	Vlade Divac	23 – 3 February 1968	2.16 m (7 ft 1 in)	Los Angeles Lakers	(United States)
SF	13	Arijan Komazec	21 – 23 January 1970	2.01 m (6 ft 7 in)	Zadar	(Socialist Federal Republic of Yugoslavia)
C	14	Dino Rađa	24 – 24 April 1967	2.11 m (6 ft 11 in)	Il Messaggero Roma	(Italy)
C	15	Zoran Savić	24 – 18 November 1966	2.06 m (6 ft 9 in)	POP 84	(Socialist Federal Republic of Yugoslavia)

Head coach

- (Socialist Federal Republic of Yugoslavia) Dušan Ivković

Assistant coach(es)

- (Socialist Federal Republic of Yugoslavia) Rajko Toroman
- (Socialist Federal Republic of Yugoslavia) Ibrahim Krehić

Legend

- Club – describes last
  club before the tournament
- Age – describes age
  on 24 June 1991
