= Basketball in Slovenia =

- Country: Slovenia
- Governing body: KZS
- National team: Slovenia
- First played: 1992
- Registered players: 41.831
- Clubs: 134

National competitions
- List: FIBA World Cup; EuroBasket; Summer Olympics

Club competitions
- List: League: ABA League Premier A Slovenian Basketball League; 2. SKL; Slovenian Cup; Slovenian Basketball Supercup

International competitions
- List: EuroCup Basketball; Basketball Champions League; FIBA Europe Cup

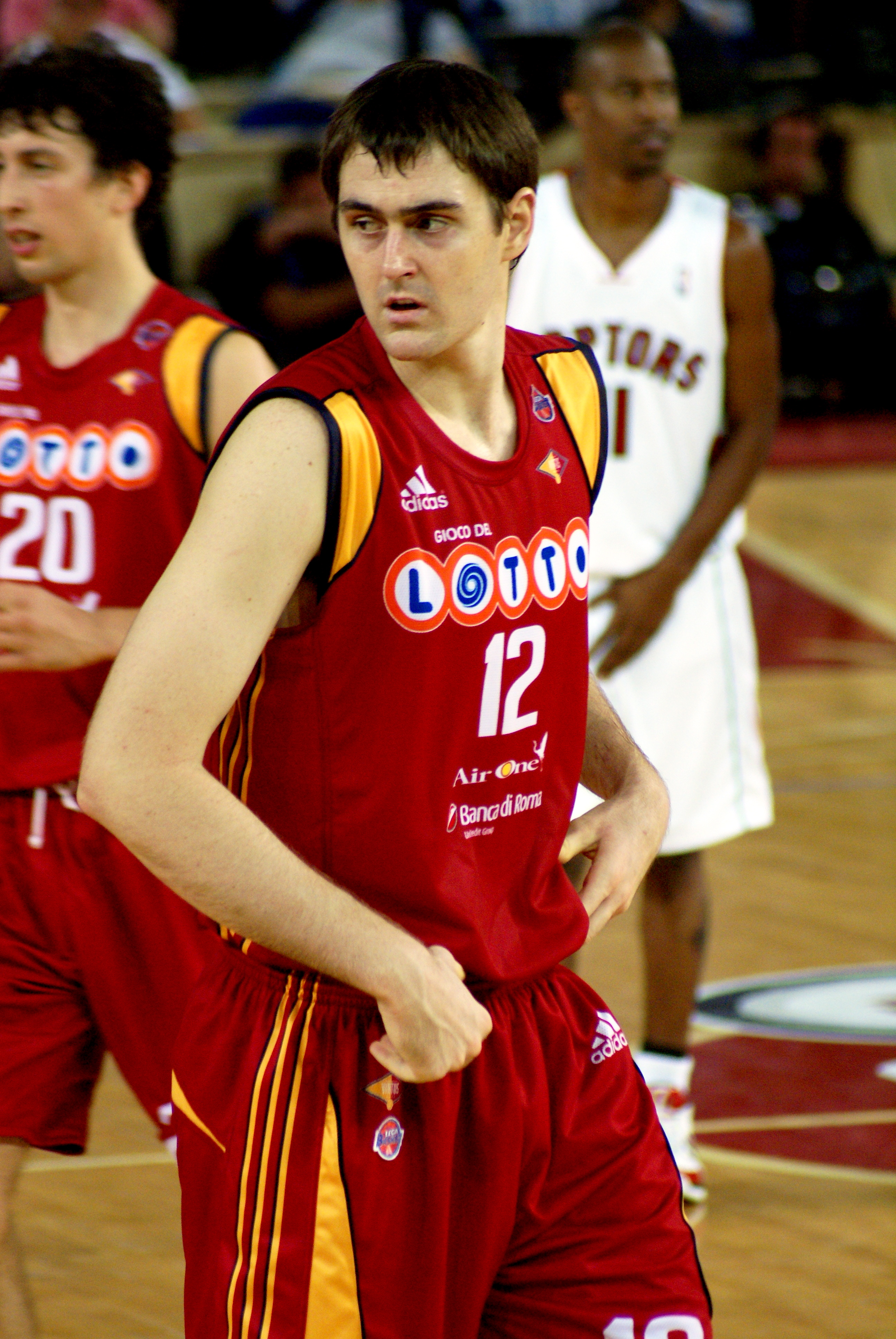
Erazem Lorbek, Slovenian former professional player

Basketball in Slovenia is governed by the Basketball Federation of Slovenia (Košarkarska zveza Slovenije). Slovenia has participated in international basketball as an independent nation since 1991, when the country gained independence from SFR Yugoslavia.

The highest level of Slovenian basketball is the Premier A Slovenian Basketball League. The Slovenia national basketball team has qualified for 13 Eurobaskets, including the gold medal in 2017 and a fourth-place finish in 2009, and three FIBA World Cups, in 2006, 2010, and 2014.

Notable Slovenian basketball players include Goran Dragić, Zoran Dragić, Luka Dončić, Sasha Vujačić, Radoslav Nesterović, Vlatko Čančar, Beno Udrih, Matjaž Smodiš, Marko Milič, Ivo Daneu, Peter Vilfan, Vinko Jelovac, Aljoša Žorga, Primož Brezec, Boštjan Nachbar, Sani Bečirović and Jaka Lakovič.

== History ==
=== Early history ===
Before basketball was introduced, Slovenians played korfball, which is similar to netball and basketball. As early as 1914, basketball was being played in Maribor. In 1921, Ciril Hočevar, a physical education teacher and member of the Sokol Maribor society, brought his basketball knowledge to the country. Although in some parts of Yugoslavia basketball was played from the 1920s onwards, it came to the territories that are today part of Slovenia only during the Second World War. In 1936, Professor Angela Bahovec introduced the sport to girls after learning the sport in England. The first club was founded in Ljubljana as a basketball section of ŽŠK Hermes in 1943, when the city was under Italian administration. After the war, basketball was promoted mostly by students who came from the Belgrade Sports Institute and new clubs were soon founded in Ljubljana, Maribor, Murska Sobota, Celje and Lendava. The first postwar public match was played in February 1946 and the first Championship was held later that year, with Svoboda winning the first title. The Slovenian champion had the opportunity of competing for the Yugoslav Championship in the final tournament until 1949, when with the formation of the Basketball Federation of Yugoslavia an annual league called the federal league was established. It was joined by two best Slovenian teams Enotnost and Železničar, who later both played a major role in Yugoslav basketball. Enotnost, renamed Olimpija, won the Yugoslav league six times, while Železničar won one cup title.

=== Successes with Yugoslavia ===
On 15 January 1950 the Basketball Federation of Slovenia was founded as a section of the Yugoslav federation and home and away round-robin Republic league matches were established as a second or third tier of Yugoslav basketball. The Republic champion had the opportunity of promotion to the Yugoslav leagues and apart from Olimpija and Železničar also Slovan, ŽKK Maribor, Lesonit and Maribor 66 managed to play in the Yugoslav First Federal Basketball League. In 1950 Mirko Amon (Železničar), best scorer of Yugoslav League that season, became the first Slovenian player in Yugoslavia national basketball team, later to be followed by many others. Slovenian players with most appearances for the national team were Ivo Daneu, Peter Vilfan, Jure Zdovc, Boris Kristančič and Aljoša Žorga. Slovenian players had an important role when Yugoslavia won the 1970 FIBA World Cup in Tivoli Hall in Ljubljana, while they were also members of 1978 and 1990 World Championships' winning teams. Apart from men, women's basketball was also popular with Iskra Delta Ježica being regular in Yugoslav women's league and many players becoming members of women's national team, the team which won four silver medals at the FIBA Women's EuroBasket tournament from 1968 until 1991.

=== Separation from Yugoslavia and independent successes ===
After the Independence of Slovenia in 1991, national League and Cup competitions were formed on the basis of Old Republic structures. Slovenia became official members of FIBA on 10 January 1992 and the Slovenia national basketball team played their first official match against Croatia in May of that year. In 2017, Slovenia won that year's Eurobasket, with Goran Dragić as the tournament’s MVP. In 2023, they tied their best finish at a FIBA World Cup with 7th, which they also finished with in the 2014 edition.

Meanwhile, the women's national team made its debut in 1993. In 2023, Slovenia co-hosted that year's Eurobasket Women alongside Israel.

== National teams ==
Senior

- Men's
- Women's
- 3x3

Youth

- Boys' U20
- Boys' U19
- Boys' U17
- Girls' U20
- Girls' U18
- Girls' U16

== Leagues ==
=== Men ===
- Adriatic League
- Slovenian Basketball League
- Slovenian Second Basketball League

=== Women ===
- WABA League
- Slovenian Women's Basketball League
