= Yugoslav First Federal Basketball League career stats leaders =

Yugoslav First Federal Basketball League career stats leaders are the stats leaders of the now-defunct the Yugoslav First Federal Basketball League (FFBL), the top-tier level professional basketball league in SFR Yugoslavia.

== List of career scoring leaders ==
- The following is a list of Yugoslav First Federal Basketball League players by total career points scored.

Rank	Player	Total Points Scored	Teams
1	Vinko Jelovac	7,351	Olimpija (1969–82)
2	Radmilo Mišović	6,526	Borac (1958–78); Železničar (1979–80)
3	Dražen Dalipagić	6,297	Partizan (1971–80, 1981–82)
4	Josip Gjergja	6,244	Zadar (1958–76)
5	Nikola Plećaš	6,045	Lokomotiva (1967–76); Kvarner (1976–78)
6	Branko Skroče	5,755	Zadar (1973–87)
7	Radivoj Korać	5,733	Beograd (1954–67)
8	Dragan Kićanović	5,491	Borac (1971–72); Partizan (1972–81)
9	Damir Šolman	5,487	Mladost (1963–68); Jugoplastika (1968–77, 1979–83)
10	Rato Tvrdić	5,196	Jugoplastika (1960–77)
11	Ivo Daneu	5,188	Olimpija (1956–70)
12	Vladimir Cvetković	5,024	Crvena zvezda (1959–72)
13	Dražen Petrović	4,876	Šibenka (1979–83); Cibona (1984–88)
14	Mirza Delibašić	4,869	Sloboda (1968–72); Bosna (1972–80)
15	Milun Marović	4,826	Radnički (1967–83)
16	Dragoslav Ražnatović	4,802	Radnički (1959–74)
17	Duško Ivanović	4,585	Budućnost (1980–87); Jugoplastika (1987–90)
18	Peter Vilfan	4,524	Jugoplastika (1976–78); Olimpija (1979–84, 1987–93); Partizan (1985–86)
19	Dragan Kapičić	4,519	Crvena zvezda (1965–77)
20	Andro Knego	4,519	Cibona (1977–85, 1986–87, 1990–92)
21	Žarko Varajić	4,486	Bosna (1969–81, 1982–84)
22	Krešimir Ćosić	4,452	Zadar (1964–69, 1973–76); Olimpija (1976–78); Cibona (1980–83)
23	Boris Križan	4,377	Željezničar (1961–73)
24	Branko Radović	4,364	Split (1949–1952, 1960–1964); Montažno (1952–1954); Partizan (1954–1957); Crvena zvezda (1957–1960)
25	Blaž Kotarac	4,358	Beograd (1966–77)
26	Blagoja Georgievski	4,180	Rabotnički (1968–84)
27	Branko Kovačević	4,145	Metalac (1969–78); Crvena zvezda (1979–84); Olimpija (1984–86)
28	Miroljub Damjanović	4,102	Radnički (1967–79)
29	Zoran Slavnić	3,974	Crvena zvezda (1967–77); Šibenka (1979–81); Partizan (1981–82)
30	Dragutin Čermak	3,865	Radnički (1967–69, 1976–80); Partizan (1969–73)
31	Ljubodrag Simonović	3,268	Crvena zvezda (1967–76)

== See also ==
- Yugoslav First Federal League Top Scorer
