= 1970–71 Yugoslav First Basketball League =

- League: Yugoslav First Basketball League
- Sport: Basketball

1970-71
- Season champions: (Socialist Republic of Croatia) Jugoplastika

Yugoslav First Basketball League seasons
- ← 1969–70 1971–72 →

The 1970–71 Yugoslav First Basketball League season was the 27th season of the Yugoslav First Basketball League, the highest professional basketball league in SFR Yugoslavia.

== Teams ==
(Socialist Republic of Croatia) SR Croatia

- Jugoplastika
- Lokomotiva
- Oriolik
- Zadar
- Željezničar Karlovac

(Socialist Republic of Serbia) SR Serbia

- Borac Čačak
- Crvena Zvezda
- OKK Beograd
- Partizan
- Radnički Belgrade

(Socialist Republic of Macedonia) SR Macedonia

- Rabotnički

(Socialist Republic of Slovenia) SR Slovenia

- Olimpija

== Classification ==
	Regular season ranking 1970-71	G	V	P	PF	PS	Pt
1.	Jugoplastika	22	19	3	1895	1677	38
2.	Lokomotiva	22	16	6	1953	1788	32
3.	Crvena Zvezda	22	15	7	1929	1685	30
4.	OKK Beograd	22	12	10	1519	1509	24
5.	Rabotnički	22	11	11	1646	1632	22
6.	Olimpija	22	11	11	1797	1762	22
7.	Zadar	22	10	12	1653	1692	20
8.	Radnički Belgrade	22	9	13	1868	1913	18
9.	Borac Čačak	22	9	13	1681	1746	18
10.	Partizan	22	8	14	1734	1781	16
11.	Oriolik	22	8	14	1532	1669	16
12.	Željezničar Karlovac	22	4	18	1576	1929	8

The winning roster of Jugoplastika:

- (Socialist Federal Republic of Yugoslavia) Drago Peterka (born 1942, 83 points)
- (Socialist Federal Republic of Yugoslavia) Zoran Grašo (1948, 30)
- (Socialist Federal Republic of Yugoslavia) Mihajlo Manović (1948, 104)
- (Socialist Federal Republic of Yugoslavia) Ivo Škarić (1951, 4)
- (Socialist Federal Republic of Yugoslavia) Ratomir Tvrdić (1943, 392)
- (Socialist Federal Republic of Yugoslavia) Martin Guvo (1949, 3)
- (Socialist Federal Republic of Yugoslavia) Dražen Tvrdić (1947, 31)
- (Socialist Federal Republic of Yugoslavia) Lovre Tvrdić (1941, 138)
- (Socialist Federal Republic of Yugoslavia) Damir Šolman (1948, 526)
- (Socialist Federal Republic of Yugoslavia) Siniša Depolo
- (Socialist Federal Republic of Yugoslavia) Zdenko Prug (1944, 196)
- (Socialist Federal Republic of Yugoslavia) Petar Skansi (1943, 387)
- (Socialist Federal Republic of Yugoslavia) Gordan Grgin
- (Socialist Federal Republic of Yugoslavia) Momčilo Radulović (1945, 1)

Coach: (Socialist Federal Republic of Yugoslavia) Branko Radović

== Results ==
Home \ Away	JUG	CZV	LOK	RAD	RAB	PAR	OLI	OKK	BOR	ZAD	ŽKA	ORI
Jugoplastika	—	79–77	84–86	93–87	93–71	109–75	91–71	89–77	70–59	102–83	87–59	93–60
Crvena Zvezda	106–82	—	107–94	103–71	81–66	86–74	103–81	84–80	92–73	73–77	104–78	95–52
Lokomotiva	84–87	79–78	—	108–66	96–90	101–99	92–85	83–73	117–69	94–87	112–73	88–80
Radnički Belgrade	84–101	101–108	114–109	—	82–78	91–94	98–85	83–82	101–96	105–76	100–62	88–71
Rabotnički	75–78	90–79	85–71	91–75	—	75–72	93–70	61–68	75–71	86–81	68–65	81–63
Partizan	72–83	78–73	85–89	86–78	61–70	—	80–81	80–71	74–67	79–72	101–85	93–71
Olimpija	91–98	75–72	65–81	86–89	67–64	86–80	—	65–68	92–60	101–92	111–79	99–69
OKK Beograd	66–70	66–65	57–65	81–72	48–66	70–50	74–67	—	66–61	55–53	72–70	55–61
Borac Čačak	82–80	69–78	87–81	77–76	87–76	82–70	73–71	70–71	—	71–73	89–61	88–82
Zadar	76–83	66–82	70–73	77–63	85–63	79–77	63–72	65–62	84–74	—	86–66	79–56
Željezničar Karlovac	68–82	83–99	79–95	77–75	66–65	80–79	81–97	78–86	68–94	71–77	—	76–75
Oriolik	63–64	71–85	68–56	72–69	66–51	83–75	62–72	51–71	87–82	84–52	85–51	—

Source: Partizanopedia.rs
Legend: Blue = home team win; Red = away team win.
Matches with lighter background shading were decided after overtime.

== Qualification in 1971-72 season European competitions ==
FIBA European Champions Cup

- Jugoplastika (champions)

FIBA Cup Winner's Cup

- Crvena Zvezda (Cup winners)

FIBA Korać Cup

- Lokomotiva (2nd)
- OKK Beograd (4th)

== Basketball Cup ==
=== Bracket ===
Eightfinals
Crvena zvezda	103
Partizan	71
Jugoplastika	75
OKK Beograd	73
Zadar	88
Željezničar Sarajevo	38
Sloboda Tuzla
Željezničar Karlovac
Kombinat Zrenjanin	65
Lokomotiva	114
Borac Čačak	71
AŠK Olimpija	85
Radnički Belgrade	109
Ivangrad	72
Rabotnički	146
Maribor	53

Quarterfinals
Crvena zvezda	78
Jugoplastika	76
Zadar	103
Željezničar Karlovac	77
Lokomotiva	90
AŠK Olimpija	93
Radnički Belgrade	79
Rabotnički	76

Semifinals
Crvena zvezda	89
Zadar	72
AŠK Olimpija	88
Rabotnički	83

Finals
Crvena zvezda	82
AŠK Olimpija	70
