= 1969–70 Yugoslav First Basketball League =

- League: Yugoslav First Basketball League
- Sport: Basketball

1969-70
- Season champions: (Socialist Republic of Slovenia) Olimpija

Yugoslav First Basketball League seasons
- ← 1968–69 1970–71 →

The 1969–70 Yugoslav First Basketball League season was the 26th season of the Yugoslav First Basketball League, the highest professional basketball league in SFR Yugoslavia.

== Teams ==
(Socialist Republic of Serbia) SR Serbia
- Borac Čačak
- Crvena Zvezda
- OKK Beograd
- Partizan
- Radnički Belgrade
(Socialist Republic of Croatia) SR Croatia
- Jugoplastika
- Lokomotiva
- Zadar
- Željezničar Karlovac
(Socialist Republic of Macedonia) SR Macedonia
- Rabotnički
(Socialist Republic of Slovenia) SR Slovenia
- Maribor 66
- Olimpija

== Classification ==
	Regular season ranking 1969-70	G	V	P	PF	PS	Pt
1.	Olimpija	22	18	4	2137	1761	36
2.	Crvena Zvezda	22	17	5	1951	1750	34
3.	Jugoplastika	22	17	5	1913	1671	34
4.	Lokomotiva	22	14	8	1984	1890	28
5.	OKK Beograd	22	14	8	1720	1653	28
6.	Zadar	22	10	12	1704	1754	20
7.	Rabotnički	22	10	12	1673	1631	19 (-1)
8.	Borac Čačak	22	9	13	1734	1827	18
9.	Partizan	22	8	14	1751	1752	16
10.	Željezničar Karlovac	22	8	14	1632	1660	16
11.	Radnički Belgrade	22	7	15	1780	1775	14
12.	Maribor 66	22	0	22	1446	2292	0

The winning roster of Olimpija:

- (Socialist Federal Republic of Yugoslavia) Andrej Osterc
- (Socialist Federal Republic of Yugoslavia) Marko Gvardijančič
- (Socialist Federal Republic of Yugoslavia) Vital Eiselt
- (Socialist Federal Republic of Yugoslavia) Borut Bassin
- (Socialist Federal Republic of Yugoslavia) Jože Fišer
- (Socialist Federal Republic of Yugoslavia) Peter Marter
- (Socialist Federal Republic of Yugoslavia) Jure Božič
- (Socialist Federal Republic of Yugoslavia) Pavle Polanec
- (Socialist Federal Republic of Yugoslavia) Dušan Verbič
- (Socialist Federal Republic of Yugoslavia) Vinko Jelovac
- (Socialist Federal Republic of Yugoslavia) Darko Hočevar
- (Socialist Federal Republic of Yugoslavia) Đuro Lemajić
- (Socialist Federal Republic of Yugoslavia) Ivo Daneu
- (Socialist Federal Republic of Yugoslavia) Emil Logar
- (Socialist Federal Republic of Yugoslavia) Aljoša Žorga

Coach: (Socialist Federal Republic of Yugoslavia) Milan Tošić

== Results ==
Home \ Away	OLI	CZV	JUG	LOK	OKK	ZAD	RAB	BOR	PAR	ŽKA	RAD	MAR
Olimpija	—	95–82	103–78	119–97	100–83	88–87	95–80	119–74	87–85	92–74	121–91	113–56
Crvena Zvezda	87–83	—	104–98	89–80	78–77	98–90	94–81	106–82	80–72	99–75	102–98	112–51
Jugoplastika	92–77	75–76	—	95–83	86–64	88–74	111–74	88–76	96–66	89–72	98–71	122–63
Lokomotiva	72–108	100–99	79–93	—	91–75	95–84	81–70	109–90		75–74	86–88	109–72
OKK Beograd	86–75	77–78	86–81	77–73	—	87–68	70–63	80–72	67–64	56–55	93–90	106–65
Zadar	77–78	75–70	93–79	75–81	68–67	—		82–73	56–85	81–70	65–66	
Rabotnički	101–96	67–78	72–77	79–91	74–60	70–74	—	94–70	91–75		87–68	77–49
Borac Čačak	76–95	88–96	65–68	101–93	62–87	107–96	20–0^{1}	—	66–86	86–81	86–84	94–57
Partizan	67–98	75–73	64–65	94–95	63–77	91–71	58–64	92–108	—	77–68	97–88	120–56
Željezničar Karlovac	74–75	68–66	71–81		71–87	70–72	70–62	86–78	75–69	—	62–60	104–64
Radnički Belgrade	76–78	85–91	81–82	78–79	71–65	73–75	80–73			73–81	—	
Maribor 66	66–142	74–99	81–93	68–119	65–109	76–78	61–103	63–97	66–84	60–82	65–91	—

Source: Partizanopedia.rs
Legend: Blue = home team win; Red = away team win.
Matches with lighter background shading were decided after overtime.

^{1} The match between Borac and Rabotnički was registered as 20-0 win for the home team, because team of Rabotnički had not travelled to Čačak.

== Qualification in 1970-71 season European competitions ==
FIBA European Champions Cup

- Olimpija (champions)

FIBA Cup Winner's Cup

- Zadar (Cup winners)
