= Branko Radović (basketball) =

Yugoslav basketball player and coach

Personal information
- Born: 5 December 1933 Dubrovnik, Zeta Banovina, Kingdom of Yugoslavia
- Died: 18 November 1993 (aged 59) Split, Croatia

Career information
- NBA draft: 1955: undrafted
- Playing career: 1949–1964
- Coaching career: 1964–1972

Career history

Playing
- 1949–1952: Split
- 1952–1954: Montažno
- 1954–1957: Partizan
- 1957–1960: Crvena zvezda
- 1960–1964: Split

Coaching
- 1964–1972: Jugoplastika Split

Career highlights
- As coach: Yugoslav League champion (1971); Yugoslav Cup winner (1972)
Medals
Men's basketball
Representing Yugoslavia
Mediterranean Games
Gold medal – first place	1959 Lebanon	Team
Balkan Basketball Championship
Silver medal – second place	1959 Romania	Team

Branko Radović (Serbian Cyrillic: Бранко Радовић; December 5, 1933 – November 18, 1993) was a Yugoslav basketball player and coach. He represented the Yugoslavia national team internationally. He is a member of Split Sports Hall of Fame under the name Father of Split's basketball.

== Playing career ==
Radović started and finished his career with the Split of the Yugoslav First League. In between, he played for the Montažno in Zagreb as well as for the Partizan and the Crvena zvezda in Belgrade.

In 1959 season he was a top scorer with 31 points per game, more than Radivoj Korać. In a game with Lokomotiva Zagreb he scored a record high 64 points.

=== Yugoslavia national team ===
As a player for the Yugoslavia national basketball team Radović played 32 games between 1957–1959. He participated at two European Championships (1957 in Bulgaria and 1959 in Turkey) He won a gold medal at the 1959 Mediterranean Games in Lebanon.

== Coaching career ==
After retiring from his playing career in 1964, Radović became a head coach of the Jugoplastika. He won the first national championship title for Split in 1970–71 season and led them to the 1972 European Champions Cup Finals, where he lost to the Italian team Ignis Varese led by Aleksandar Nikolić. He spent his entire coaching career with team from Split and retired after the 1971–72 season. During that time players of Jugoplastika included Ratomir Tvrdić, Damir Šolman, Petar Skansi and Duje Krstulović.

== Career achievements ==
- Yugoslav League champion: 1 (with Jugoplastika: 1970–71).
- Yugoslav Cup winner: 2 (with Jugoplastika: 1972).

Individual

- Yugoslav League top scorer: 1 (with Crvena zvezda: 1959)

== See also ==
- List of Yugoslav First Federal Basketball League annual scoring leaders
