= Slovenian Athletes Hall of Fame =

The Slovenian Athletes Hall of Fame (Slovene: "Hram slavnih slovenskih športnikov") was founded in 2011 by the Society of Slovenian Sports Journalists (Društvo športnih novinarjev Slovenije) and includes Slovenian athletes from different sport disciplines. At the Slovenian Sportsperson of the Year event in December 2011, they inducted the first two Slovenian athletes, Leon Štukelj and Miroslav Cerar.

The goal of the Society of Slovenian Sports Journalists was to bring recognition to Slovenian athletes. They aimed to keep all sports equipment belonging or otherwise connected to prominent athletes and archive various accounts of historic sport events.

On 19 December 2012, twenty new inductees were introduced, and the Hall of Fame was opened in Stožice Arena. On 28 November 2013, the Hall of Fame inducted a new class of 28 new athletes. Three athletes were introduced in August 2015, two in August 2016 and December 2017 and three in January 2019.

== Inductees ==
Inductee	Sport	Year
Leon Štukelj	gymnastics	2011
Miroslav Cerar	gymnastics	2011
Rudolf Cvetko	fencing	2012
Stane Derganc	gymnastics	2012
Peter Šumi	gymnastics	2012
Josip Primožič	gymnastics	2012
Ludvik Starič	motorcycling	2012
Nataša Urbančič	athletics	2012
Draga Stamejčič	athletics	2012
Stanko Lorger	athletics	2012
Janez Polda	ski jumping	2012
Jože Šlibar	ski jumping	2012
Albin Felc	ice hockey	2012
Rudi Hiti	ice hockey	2012
Vinko Jelovac	basketball	2012
Aljoša Žorga	basketball	2012
Ivo Daneu	basketball	2012
Brane Oblak	soccer	2012
Janez Žirovnik	cycling	2012
Mima Jaušovec	tennis	2012
Eights from 1964 OG	rowing	2012
Miro Steržaj	nine-pin bowling	2012
Franc Smolej	cross-country skiing	2013
Ciril Praček	alpine skiing	2013
Branko Ziherl	diving	2013
Tone Cerer	swimming	2013
Tine Mulej	alpine skiing	2013
Janko Štefe	alpine skiing	2013
Ivan Toplak	association football	2013
Janko Kosmina and Mario Fafangel	sailing	2013
Tine Šrot	gymnastics	2013
Jurij Uršič	cycling	2013
Edvard Vecko	table tennis	2013
Ištvan Korpa	table tennis	2013
Tone Gale	ice hockey	2013
Milan Zadel	canoeing	2013
Stanko Topolčnik	judo	2013
Bojan Križaj	alpine skiing	2013
Peter Vilfan	basketball	2013
Bojan Ropret	cycling	2013
Boris Strel	alpine skiing	2013
Alenka Cuderman	handball	2013
Borut Petrič	swimming	2013
Miran Tepeš	ski jumping	2013
Jure Franko	alpine skiing	2013
Primož Ulaga	ski jumping	2013
Andrej Jelenc	canoeing	2013
Darjan Petrič	swimming	2013
Matjaž Debelak	ski jumping	2013
Mateja Svet	alpine skiing	2013
Srečko Katanec	association football	2015
Rok Petrovič	alpine skiing	2015
Jure Zdovc	basketball	2015
Iztok Puc	handball	2016
Rolando Pušnik	handball	2016
Polona Dornik	basketball	2017
Marko Elsner	association football	2017
Alenka Dovžan	alpine skiing	2019
Katja Koren	alpine skiing	2019
Jure Košir	alpine skiing	2019

== See also ==
- Slovenian Sportsperson of the Year
