= Nikola Plećaš =

Yugoslavian basketball player

Personal information
- Born: January 10, 1948 (age 78) Bruvno, PR Croatia, FPR Yugoslavia
- Listed height: 6 ft 2 in (1.88 m)
- Listed weight: 190 lb (86 kg)

Career information
- Playing career: 1967–1978
- Position: Point guard / shooting guard

Career history
- 1967–1976: Lokomotiva Zagreb
- 1976–1978: Kvarner Rijeka

Career highlights
- 2× FIBA European Selection (1970, 1972); FIBA Korać Cup champion (1972); Yugoslav Cup winner (1969)
Medals
Men's basketball
Representing Yugoslavia
Olympic Games
Silver medal – second place	1968 Mexico City
FIBA World Cup
Gold medal – first place	1970 Ljubljana
Silver medal – second place	1974 Puerto Rico
EuroBasket
Silver medal – second place	1969 Italy
Silver medal – second place	1971 West Germany
Gold medal – first place	1973 Spain
Gold medal – first place	1975 Yugoslavia
Mediterranean Games
Gold medal – first place	1967 Tunis

Nikola Plećaš (born January 10, 1948) is a former Yugoslavian professional basketball player. At a height of 1.88 m (6 ft 2 in) tall, and a weight of 86 kg (190 lb), he played at the point guard and shooting guard positions.

He was considered to be one of the greatest European basketball players of the 1960s and 1970s. During his playing career, he was nicknamed Sveti Nikola. Plećaš is an ethnic Serb.

== Club career ==
Plećaš began his playing career with the youth teams of Mladost Zagreb. He then played professionally with Lokomotiva Zagreb and Kvarner Rijeka. He was a member FIBA European Selection team, in 1970 and 1972. He won the European-wide 3rd-tier level FIBA Korać Cup championship, in 1972.

== National team career ==
Plećaš was a member of the senior Yugoslavian national basketball team. With Yugoslavia's senior national team, he won the silver medal at the 1968 Summer Olympics, the gold medal at the 1970 FIBA World Championship, and the silver medal at the 1974 FIBA World Championship. He also played at the 1972 Summer Olympics.

== See also ==
- Yugoslav First Federal Basketball League career stats leaders

== Sources ==
- Nikola Plećaš - Scorer with no flaw
- "Nekada i sad: Nikola Plećaš, veliko ime jugoslovenske košarke - "Sveti Nikola"". Slobodna Dalmacija (in Croatian). 2000-05-29.
