= Željko Poljak =

Croatian basketball player and coach

Personal information
- Born: April 29, 1959 (age 67) Crikvenica, PR Croatia, FPR Yugoslavia
- Listed height: 205 cm (6 ft 9 in)

Career information
- NBA draft: 1981: undrafted
- Playing career: 1977–1995
- Position: Power forward
- Number: 7, 9
- Coaching career: 1995–present

Career history

Playing
- 1977–1981: Kvarner
- 1981–1988: Jugoplastika
- 1988–1990: Bellinzona
- 1990–1994: Zagreb
- 1994–1995: Cibona

Coaching
- 1995–2001: KK Zagreb
- Croatia B-team (assistant)
- 2007–2008: KK Crikvenica
- 2008–2009: KK Zagreb (assistant)
- 2009–2010: KK Zrinjevac
- 2010–2011: Croatia (assistant)
- 2011–2012(?): Cedevita
Medals
Men's basketball
Representing Yugoslavia
FIBA EuroBasket
Silver medal – second place	1981 Czechoslovakia	National Team
Mediterranean Games
Silver medal – second place	1979 Yugoslavia	Team

Željko Poljak (born 29 April 1959) is a Croatian basketball coach and former basketball player who competed for Yugoslavia at European Championships 1981 and 1983. He was born in Crikvenica.
