= Dragan Kovačić =

Yugoslav-Croatian basketball player

Personal information
- Nationality: Croatian
- Born: 5 October 1939; Preloščica, Croatian Banovina, Kingdom of Yugoslavia
- Died: 11 February 1999 (aged 59); Zagreb, Croatia

Sport
- Sport: Basketball

Dragan Kovačić (5 October 1939 – 11 February 1999) was a Yugoslav-Croatian basketball player. He competed in the men's tournament at the 1964 Summer Olympics.
