= Zoran Marojević =

Serbian basketball player (1942–2019)

Personal information
- Born: 27 April 1942 Mattuglie, Kingdom of Italy
- Died: 24 April 2019 (aged 76) Belgrade, Serbia
- Listed height: 2.04 m (6 ft 8 1/2 in)
- Position: Forward / small forward

Career history
- 1965–1972: OKK Beograd
- 1972–1973: KK Željezničar Sarajevo
Medals
Men's basketball
Representing Yugoslavia
Olympic Games
Silver medal – second place	1968 Mexico City	Team competition
EuroBasket
Silver medal – second place	1969 Italy
Mediterranean Games
Gold medal – first place	1967 Tunisia

Zoran Marojević (Serbian Cyrillic: Зоран Маројевић, Croatian: Zoran Maroević; 27 April 1942 – 24 April 2019) was a Serbian professional basketball player of Croat origin who competed for Yugoslavia in the 1968 Summer Olympics.
