= Branislav Rajačić =

Serbian basketball coach and administrator

Personal information
- Born: 21 November 1931 Sarajevo, Kingdom of Yugoslavia
- Died: 30 September 1992 (aged 60) Belgrade, FR Yugoslavia
- Coaching career: 1958–1980

Career history

Coaching
- 1958–1961: Železničar Belgrade
- 1961–1965: OKK Beograd (assistant)
- 1965–1966: Partizan (youth)
- 1967: Dinamo Pančevo
- 1967–1969: Partizan
- 1969–1970: Partizan (youth)
- 1971: OKK Beograd
- 1971–1975: OKK Beograd (youth)
- 1973–1976: Yugoslavia (assistant)
- 1975–1979 1980: OKK Beograd
Medals
Men's basketball
Assistant Coach for Yugoslavia
Olympic Games
Silver medal – second place	1976 Montreal	Team
FIBA World Cup
Silver medal – second place	1974 Puerto Rico	Team
EuroBasket
Gold medal – first place	1973 Spain	Team
Gold medal – first place	1975 Yugoslavia	Team

Branislav Rajačić (Serbian Cyrillic: Бранислав Рајачић; 21 November 1931 – 30 September 1992) was a Serbian professional basketball coach and administrator.

Born in the Kingdom of Yugoslavia, he was active as a coach for over three decades, until 1980, and died in the final days of the Federal Republic of Yugoslavia.

== See also ==
- List of KK Partizan head coaches
