= Vital Eiselt =

Slovenian basketball player

Personal information
- Born: 6 May 1941 (age 85) Ljubljana, Province of Ljubljana, Kingdom of Italy
- Listed height: 1.87 m (6 ft 2 in)
- Listed weight: 78 kg (172 lb)

Career history
- AŠK Olimpija

Career highlights
- 2× Yugoslav League champion (1966, 1970)
Medals
Men's basketball
Representing Yugoslavia
FIBA World Championship
Silver medal – second place	1963 Brazil	Team
EuroBasket
Silver medal – second place	1961 Yugoslavia	Team
Silver medal – second place	1965 Soviet Union	Team

Vital Eiselt (born 6 May 1941) is a Slovenian former basketball player. He represented the Yugoslavia national basketball team internationally. Eiselt was a member of the Yugoslavia national team that competed in the men's tournament at the 1964 Summer Olympics.
