= Zvonko Petričević =

Croatian basketball player

- Born: Zvonimir Petričević; 26 July 1940; Prizren, Zeta Banovina, Kingdom of Yugoslavia
- Died: 20 January 2009 (aged 68); Samobor, Croatia
- Other names: Zvonko; Džimi; Đimi
- Education: University of Zagreb; University of Antwerp
- Occupations: Basketball player; architect
- Years active: 1959–2009
- Height: 2.10 m (6 ft 11 in)
- Basketball career

Career information
- Playing career: 1959–1968
- Position: Center
- Number: 13

Career history
- 1959–1960: Mladost Zagreb
- 1960–1965: Lokomotiva Zagreb
- 1963: → OKK Beograd
- 1966–1967: ABC Nantes
Medals
Men's basketball
Representing Yugoslavia
FIBA World Championship
Silver medal – second place	1963 Brasil	Team
EuroBasket
Silver medal – second place	1961 Yugoslavia	Team
Silver medal – second place	1965 Soviet Union	Team
Bronze medal – third place	1963 Poland	Team
Mediterranean Games
Bronze medal – third place	1963 Italy	Team

Zvonimir "Džimi" Petričević (26 July 1940 – 20 January 2009) was a Croatian basketball player and architect. He represented the Yugoslavia national basketball team internationally. Petričević was a member of the Yugoslavia national team that competed in the men's tournament at the 1960 Summer Olympics
