= Duje Krstulović =

Croatian basketball player

Dujam "Duje" Krstulović
Personal information
- Born: 5 February 1953 (age 73) Split, PR Croatia, FPR Yugoslavia
- Position: Power forward
- Number: 13

Career history
- Jugoplastika
Medals
Representing Yugoslavia
Men's basketball
Olympic Games
Gold medal – first place	1980 Moscow	Team competition
FIBA World Cup
Gold medal – first place	1978 Philippines	Team
FIBA EuroBasket
Gold medal – first place	1977 Belgium	Team
Bronze medal – third place	1979 Italy	Team

Dujam "Duje" Krstulović (born 5 February 1953) is a former Croatian basketball player who competed for SFR Yugoslavia in the 1980 Summer Olympics.
