= Vinko Jelovac =

Former Slovenian-Croatian basketball player

Personal information
- Born: 18 November 1948 (age 77) Pazin, SR Croatia, Yugoslavia
- Listed height: 208 cm (6 ft 10 in)
- Listed weight: 120 kg (265 lb)

Career information
- Playing career: 1967–1982
- Position: Center
- Coaching career: 1993–2002

Career history

Playing
- 1967–1969: Gradine Pula
- 1969–1982: Olimpija Ljubljana

Coaching
- 1993–1994: Gradine Pula
- 1994–1996: Osijek
- 1997–1998: Maccabi Tel Aviv
- 1999–2000: Cibona Zagreb
- 2001–2002: Split

Career highlights
- As player: 2× FIBA European Selection (1973, 1974); Yugoslav League champion (1970); 2× Slovenian Sportsman of the Year (1973, 1974); Yugoslav League All-Time Scoring Leader; Slovenian Athletes Hall of Fame (2012); As head coach: Israeli Super League champion (1998); Israeli State Cup winner (1998)
Medals
Men's basketball
Representing Yugoslavia
Olympic Games
Silver medal – second place	1976 Montreal
FIBA World Cup
Gold medal – first place	1970 Ljubljana
Silver medal – second place	1974 Puerto Rico
FIBA EuroBasket
Gold medal – first place	1973 Spain
Gold medal – first place	1975 Yugoslavia
Gold medal – first place	1977 Belgium
Silver medal – second place	1969 Italy
Silver medal – second place	1971 West Germany
Mediterranean Games
Gold medal – first place	1971 Izmir
FIBA European Championship for Juniors
Silver medal – second place	1968 Spain	Under-18

Vinko Jelovac (born 18 November 1948) is a Slovenian-Croatian former professional basketball player and coach. At a height of 2.08 m (6 ft 10 in) tall, and a weight of 120 kg (260 lb), he played at the center position. Jelovac was named Slovenian Sportsman of the Year in 1973 and 1974. Jelovac who is the all-time leading scorer in the history of the Yugoslav First Federal League. He was inducted into the Slovenian Athletes Hall of Fame, in 2012.

== Club career ==
During his club career, Jelovac was a long-time player of Olimpija Ljubljana. With Olimpija, he won the Yugoslav First Federal League championship in the 1969–70 season. He was also a member of the FIBA European Selection team, in 1973 and 1974. Jelovac scored the most points in the history of the Yugoslav First Federal League, with a total of 7,531 career points scored.

== National team career ==
=== Yugoslav junior national team ===
Jelovac was a member of Yugoslavia's junior national teams. With the Yugoslavia under-18 national team, he won the silver medal at the 1968 FIBA European Championship for Juniors, where he was the tournament's top scorer, with a scoring average of 24.0 points per game.

=== Yugoslav senior national team ===
Jelovac was also a member of the senior men's Yugoslav national team. With Yugoslavia, Jelovac competed at the FIBA Summer Olympics, the FIBA World Cup, the FIBA EuroBasket, and the Mediterranean Games.

He won the silver medal with Yugoslavia at the 1969 FIBA EuroBasket. A year later, Jelovac won the gold medal with Yugoslavia at the 1970 FIBA World Cup, which was Yugoslavia's first ever World Basketball Championship title. The next year, he won the silver medal at the 1971 FIBA EuroBasket, and a gold medal at the 1971 Mediterranean Games. The year after that, he was a member of Yugoslavia's team at the 1972 Munich FIBA Summer Olympics, where they finished in fifth place.

Jelovac won a gold medal at the 1973 FIBA EuroBasket, which was Yugoslavia's first ever European Basketball Championship title. He followed that up with a silver medal at the 1974 FIBA World Cup, and then added another gold medal at the 1975 FIBA EuroBasket. Jelovac also competed with Yugoslavia at the 1976 Montreal FIBA Summer Olympics, where he won a silver medal. He won yet another gold medal at the 1977 FIBA EuroBasket.

== Coaching career ==
After he retired from playing club basketball, Jelovac became a basketball coach. He was the head coach of Pula Gradine in 1993 to 1994 and of Osijek, from 1994 to 1996.

Jelovac was the head coach of Maccabi Tel Aviv, from 1997 to 1998, winning with them the Israeli State Cup title, and the Israeli Super League championship, in 1998.

He was the head coach of Cibona Zagreb, from 1999 to 2000, and of Split, from 2001 to 2002.

== See also ==
- Yugoslav First Federal Basketball League career stats leaders
