= Peter Vilfan =

Slovenian basketball player (born 1957)

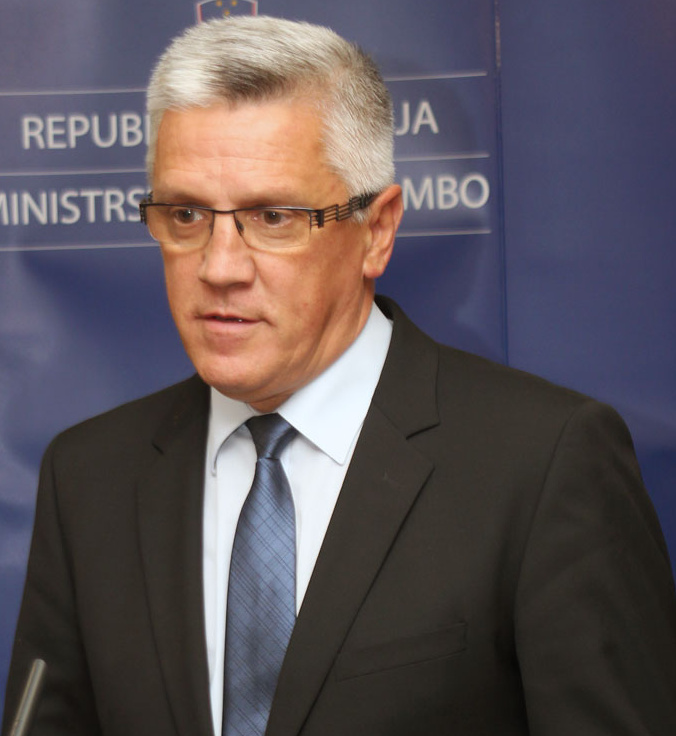
- Peter Vilfan, in 2014.

Personal information
- Born: June 29, 1957 (age 69) Maribor, PR Slovenia, FPR Yugoslavia
- Listed height: 6 ft 2.75 in (1.90 m)
- Listed weight: 195 lb (88 kg)

Career information
- Playing career: 1976–1993
- Position: Point guard / shooting guard

Career history
- 1976–1978: Jugoplastika
- 1979–1984: Smelt Olimpija
- 1985–1986: Partizan
- 1987–1993: Smelt Olimpija

Career highlights
- As player: Yugoslav League champion (1977); Yugoslav Cup winner (1977); 2× Slovenian League champion (1992, 1993); 2× Slovenian Cup winner (1992, 1993)
Medals
Men's basketball
Representing Yugoslavia
FIBA World Cup
Gold medal – first place	1978 Philippines
Bronze medal – third place	1982 Colombia
EuroBasket
Bronze medal – third place	1979 Italy
Silver medal – second place	1981 Czechoslovakia
European Championship for Cadets
Bronze medal – third place	1975 Greece	Team

Peter Vilfan (born 29 June 1957) is a Slovenian former professional basketball player, sports journalist, commentator, and a politician. He resigned from the National Assembly due to DUI in 2014, and from the State Secretary position in 2019 amid tax evasion proceedings.

As a basketball player, he was a member of the senior Yugoslavia national team, with which he won a gold medal at the 1978 FIBA World Championship, in Manila. He was inducted into the Slovenian Athletes Hall of Fame, in 2013.

== Basketball club career ==
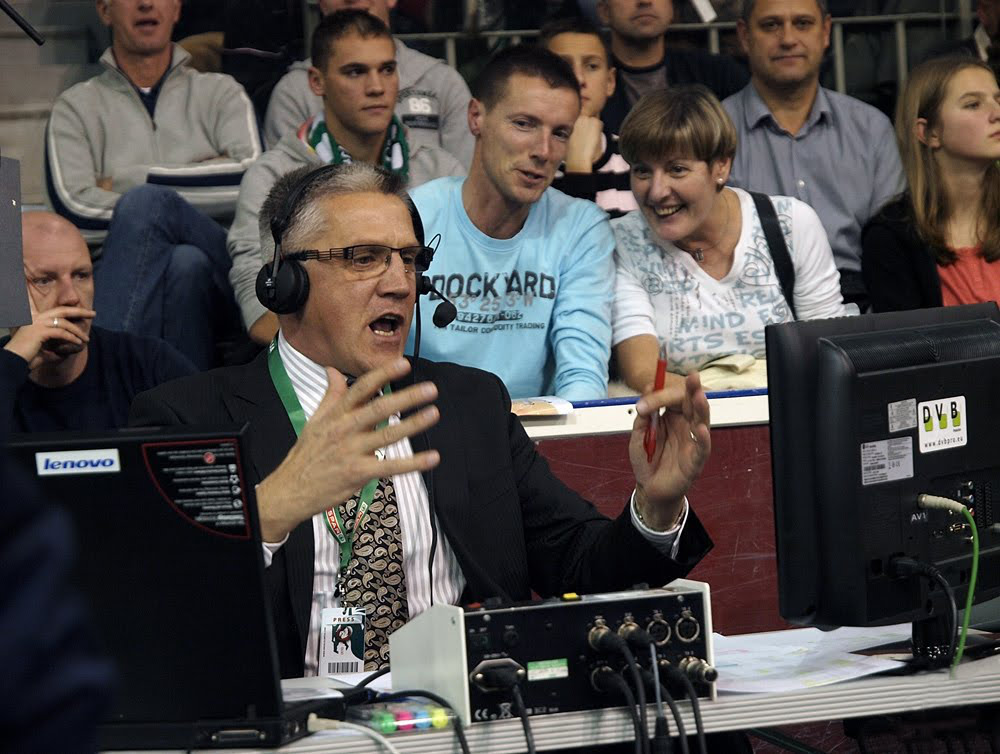
Vilfan working as an RTV Slovenia color commentator at the Union Olimpija vs. Maccabi Tel Aviv EuroLeague game at Hala Tivoli in December 2009.

During his club basketball playing career, Vilfan played with Maribor, Jugoplastika, Olimpija, and Partizan.

== Basketball national team career ==
=== Yugoslavian national team ===
Vilfan made 121 appearances with the senior Yugoslavian national basketball team, between 1977 and 1983, making him the third most capped Slovenian player for Yugoslavia. He played in five major international FIBA tournaments: the 1978 FIBA World Championship, the EuroBasket 1979, the EuroBasket 1981, the 1982 FIBA World Championship, and the EuroBasket 1983. He won one gold and one bronze medal at the FIBA World Cup, and one silver and one bronze at the EuroBasket.

=== Slovenian national team ===
Vilfan was the first team captain of the senior Slovenian national basketball team, following Slovenia's independence from Yugoslavia.

== Post-playing career ==
After his retirement from playing professional basketball, Vilfan began working at the Slovenian radio and television network, as a sports commentator. He also opened a basketball school for children.

== Political career ==
In 2011, Vilfan joined the Positive Slovenia (PS) party, and was elected to the National Assembly. For the May 2014 European Parliament elections, he was placed last (8th place) on the list of candidates by the PS. On 29 April 2014, he left the PS party.

On 10 May 2014, he was driving under the influence, and hit an elderly pedestrian, who needed hospitalization. The next day, he admitted to the DUI event, and resigned as a member of the National Assembly.

On 31 May 2014, he became a vice-president of the newly founded party Alliance of Alenka Bratušek. In 2018 elections, Vilfan was not elected to the National Assembly and he became a State Secretary in Prime Minister's cabinet. In 2019, he resigned over tax evasion accusations. Upon his resignation he paid €30,000 of additional taxes levied on him by tax authorities. In his resignation statement, he wrote that he had not reported his income correctly due to "bookkeeping error" and that he was resigning amid "two months of media pursuit, defamation, and pressure."

== Personal life ==
Vilfan's son-in-law is the Macedonian professional basketball player Vlado Ilievski.

== See also ==
- Yugoslav First Federal Basketball League career stats leaders
