= Aljoša Žorga =

Slovenian basketball player

Personal information
- Born: 25 February 1947 (age 79) Ljubljana, PR Slovenia, FPR Yugoslavia
- Listed height: 200 cm (6 ft 7 in)
- Listed weight: 91 kg (201 lb)
Medals
Men's basketball
Representing Yugoslavia
Silver medal – second place	1968 Mexico City	Team competition
European U-18 Championship
Silver medal – second place	1966 Italy	Team

Aljoša Žorga (born 25 February 1947) is a former Slovenian basketball player who competed for Yugoslavia in the 1968 Summer Olympics. He was inducted into the Slovenian Athletes Hall of Fame, in 2012.
