= Damir Šolman =

Croatian basketball player (1948–2023)

Personal information
- Born: 7 September 1948 Zagreb, PR Croatia, FPR Yugoslavia
- Died: 2 May 2023 (aged 74)
- Listed height: 199 cm (6 ft 6 in)
- Listed weight: 93 kg (205 lb)

Career information
- Playing career: 1963–1983
- Position: Small forward
- Number: 12

Career history
- 1963–1968: Mladost Zagreb
- 1968–1977: Jugoplastika
- 1977–1979: Pallacanestro Vigevano
- 1979–1983: Jugoplastika

Career highlights
- FIBA European Selection (1974); 2× FIBA Korać Cup champion (1976, 1977); 2× Yugoslav League champion (1971, 1977); 3× Yugoslav Cup winner (1972, 1974, 1977)
Medals
Men's basketball
Representing Yugoslavia
Olympic Games
Silver medal – second place	1968 Mexico City	National team
Silver medal – second place	1976 Montreal	National team
FIBA World Cup
Gold medal – first place	1970 Ljubljana	National team
Silver medal – second place	1974 Puerto Rico	National team
EuroBasket
Gold medal – first place	1973 Spain	National team
Gold medal – first place	1975 Yugoslavia	National team
Mediterranean Games
Gold medal – first place	1967 Tunis	National Team
Gold medal – first place	1971 Turkey	National Team
European U-18 Championship
Silver medal – second place	1966 Italy	Team
Silver medal – second place	1968 Spain	Team

Damir Šolman (7 September 1948 – 2 May 2023) was a Croatian professional basketball player.

== Professional career ==
Šolman was a FIBA European Selection, in 1974.

== National team career ==
Šolman competed with the senior Yugoslavian national basketball team in the 1968 Summer Olympics, the 1972 Summer Olympics, and in the 1976 Summer Olympics (where he was the team's captain). With the Yugoslav national team, he played in 226 caps, and scored 1,785 points.

== Death ==
Šolman died in May 2023, at the age of 74.

== See also ==
- Yugoslav First Federal Basketball League career stats leaders
