= Ratomir Tvrdić =

Croatian basketball player (1943–2024)

Personal information
- Born: 14 September 1943 Split, FS Croatia, DF Yugoslavia
- Died: 20 August 2024 (aged 80)
- Listed height: 6 ft 1 in (1.85 m)
- Listed weight: 176 lb (80 kg)

Career information
- Playing career: 1960–1977
- Position: Shooting guard
- Number: 4, 10

Career history
- 1960–1977: Jugoplastika Split

Career highlights
- FIBA European Selection (1973); 2× FIBA Korać Cup champion (1976, 1977); 2× Yugoslav League champion (1971, 1977); 3× Yugoslav Cup winner (1972, 1974, 1977)
Medals
Men's basketball
Representing Yugoslavia
FIBA World Cup
Silver medal – second place	1967 Montevideo	Team
Gold medal – first place	1970 Ljubljana	Team
Silver medal – second place	1974 Puerto Rico	Team
FIBA EuroBasket
Silver medal – second place	1969 Italy	Team
Gold medal – first place	1973 Spain	Team
Gold medal – first place	1975 Yugoslavia	Team

Ratomir "Rato" Tvrdić (14 September 1943 – 20 August 2024) was a Croatian professional basketball player.

== Professional career ==
Tvrdić played club basketball with the Croatian team KK Split. With Split, he won two national Yugoslav League championships (1971, 1977), three national Yugoslav Cups (1972, 1974, 1977), and two FIBA Korać Cups (1976, 1977). He was also a runner-up of the FIBA European Champions Cup (EuroLeague) in the 1971–72 season, and in the FIBA Cup Winners' Cup (FIBA Saporta Cup) in the 1972–73 season.

He won the Small Triple Crown, in the 1976–77 season.

== National Team career ==
Tvrdić played with the senior Yugoslav national team at the 1972 Summer Olympic Games. He was also the Yugoslav national team's captain. With Yugoslavia, he won several gold and silver medals, including at the FIBA World Cup and the FIBA EuroBasket.

He won silver medals at the 1967 FIBA World Championship and the 1974 FIBA World Championship, and a gold medal at the 1970 FIBA World Championship. He also won a silver medal at the 1969 EuroBasket, and gold medals at the 1973 EuroBasket and the 1975 EuroBasket. He also won a gold medal at the 1967 Mediterranean Games.

== Death ==
Tvrdić died on 20 August 2024, at the age of 80.
