= Ivo Daneu =

Slovenian professional basketball player and coach

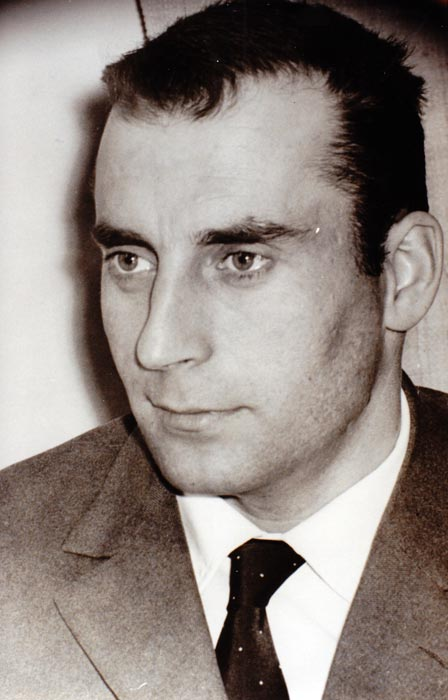
- Daneu in 1967.

Personal information
- Born: 6 October 1937 (age 89) Maribor, Kingdom of Yugoslavia
- Listed height: 183 cm (6 ft 0 in)
- Listed weight: 82 kg (181 lb)

Career information
- Playing career: 1956–1970
- Position: Point guard / shooting guard
- Number: 10, 13
- Coaching career: 1970–1976

Career history

Playing
- 1956–1970: AŠK Olimpija

Coaching
- 1970–1971: AŠK Olimpija
- 1976: Rudar Trbovlje

Career highlights
- As player: FIBA World Cup MVP (1967); FIBA European Selection (1967); 6× Yugoslav League champion (1957, 1959, 1961, 1962, 1966, 1970); Yugoslav Sportsperson of the Year (1967); Slovenian Sportsperson of the Year (1969); FIBA's 50 Greatest Players; No. 13 retired by Union Olimpija
- FIBA Hall of Fame
Medals
Men's basketball
Representing Yugoslavia
FIBA World Cup
Silver medal – second place	1963 Rio de Janeiro
Silver medal – second place	1967 Montevideo
Gold medal – first place	1970 Ljubljana
Olympic Games
Silver medal – second place	1968 Mexico City
EuroBasket
Silver medal – second place	1969 Italy
Silver medal – second place	1961 Yugoslavia
Silver medal – second place	1965 Soviet Union
Bronze medal – third place	1963 Poland
Mediterranean Games
Gold medal – first place	1959 Lebanon

Ivo Daneu (born 6 October 1937) is a retired Slovenian professional basketball player and coach. During his playing career, at a height of 1.84 m (6 ft 0 in) tall, he played at the point guard and shooting guard positions. He represented the Yugoslavia national basketball team internationally.

He was voted the Best Sportsperson of the Year in Yugoslavia, in 1967, and the Slovenian Sportsperson of the Year, in 1969. He was named one of FIBA's 50 Greatest Players in 1991. He was enshrined into the FIBA Hall of Fame, in 2007. He was inducted into the Slovenian Athletes Hall of Fame, in 2012.

== Playing career ==
=== Club career ===
During his club career, Daneu played with Branik Maribor (1949–1956) at the junior levels, and with AŠK Olimpija (1956–1970), at the senior men's level. With AŠK Olimpija, he won the Yugoslav First Federal League championship six times (1957, 1959, 1961, 1962, 1966, and 1970).

In 1958, Daneu made his debut in the EuroLeague, averaging 17.3 points per game. In total, the Slovenian guard played 4 seasons in this competition, averaging 25.2 points per game. He twice led the Olimpija team to the EuroLeague semi-finals stage. In all 4 of his seasons in the EuroLeague, Daneu was ranked among the Top 20 scorers and in three of those seasons, he finished the season in Top 5. He finished his EuroLeague career with 656 points in 26 games, averaging 25.2 points per game.

He was a FIBA European Selection in 1967. After his playing career ended in 1970, his number 13 jersey was retired by Olimpija.

=== National team career ===
Daneu played in 209 games with the senior Yugoslavian national team, from 1956 to 1970. With Yugoslavia's senior team, he won the following medals: the gold medal at the 1970 FIBA World Championship, the silver medal at the 1968 Summer Olympic Games, silver medals at the 1963 FIBA World Championship and the 1967 FIBA World Championship (where he was also voted the tournament's MVP), silver medals at the 1961 EuroBasket, 1965 EuroBasket, and 1969 EuroBasket, and a bronze medal at the 1963 EuroBasket.

== Coaching career ==
Daneu was the head coach of AŠK Olimpija (1970–71), and Rudar Trbovlje (1976).

== Personal life ==
His son is former basketball player Jaka Daneu and his grandson Žiga is also a basketball player.

Awards
Preceded by Vera Nikolić	The Best Athlete of Yugoslavia; 1967	Succeeded by Đurđa Bjedov
Preceded by Miroslav Cerar	Yugoslav Sportsman of the Year; 1967	Succeeded by Miroslav Cerar
