= KK Crvena zvezda in the National Leagues =

KK Crvena zvezda in the National Leagues shows records and statistics of Serbian men's professional basketball club Crvena zvezda in the domestic competition system. The Crvena zvezda squads have won 21 National League championships, including 10-in-a-row and current 6-in-a-row sequences. They have played three different National Leagues since 1945, including Yugoslav First Federal League (1945–1992), First League of Serbia and Montenegro (1992–2006) and Serbian League (2006 onward).

== Overview ==
Note: Statistics are correct through the end of the 2020–21 season.

Competition	Record							
Competition	Pld	W	D	L	PF	PA	PD	Win %
(Socialist Federal Republic of Yugoslavia) Yugoslavia (1945–1991)	986	622	10	354	81,724	76,552	+5172	63.08
Serbia and Montenegro (1991–2006)	417	269	0	148	35,305	33,261	+2044	64.51
Serbia (2006–present)	236	169	0	67	19,684	17,636	+2048	71.61
Total	1,639	1,060	10	569	136,713	127,449	+9264	64.67

Last updated: November 14, 2021
Source: Competitions

== Competitions ==
=== Yugoslavia (1945–1991) ===
==== Standings (1945–1981) ====
Season	Regular season								
Season	G	W	D	L	W–L%	PF	PA	PD	Result
1946	7	6	0	1	.857	305	107	+198	Won Championship
1947	9	9	0	0	1.000	523	259	+264	Won Championship
1948	9	8	0	1	.889	454	265	+189	Won Championship
1949	18	17	0	1	.944	796	475	+321	Won Championship
1950	18	16	0	2	.857	839	565	+274	Won Championship
1951	22	18	2	2	.818	1,149	761	+388	Won Championship
1952	13	12	0	1	.923	687	516	+171	Won Championship
1953	12	10	1	1	.833	755	622	+133	Won Championship
1954	22	16	0	6	.727	1,483	1,278	+205	Won Championship
1955	18	14	1	3	.778	1,273	1,009	+264	Won Championship
1956	18	10	3	5	.556	1,178	1,095	+83	4th place
1957	18	11	1	6	.611	1,229	1,162	+67	3rd place
1958	18	11	1	6	.611	1,256	1,161	+95	3rd place
1959	18	11	1	6	.611	1,562	1,471	+91	Runner-up
1960	18	7	0	11	.389	1,275	1,285	–10	6th place
1961	18	10	0	8	.556	1,427	1,369	+58	6th place
1962	18	5	0	13	.278	1,378	1,443	–65	8th place
1963	18	8	0	10	.444	1,626	1,691	–65	8th place
1964	18	12	0	6	.667	1,387	1,335	+52	3rd place
1965	22	11	0	11	.500	1,682	1,666	+16	8th place
1966	22	14	0	8	.636	1,922	1,803	+119	4th place
1967	22	15	0	7	.682	1,853	1,661	+192	3rd place
1967–68	22	14	0	8	.636	1,904	1,634	+270	3rd place
1968–69	22	19	0	3	.864	1,900	1,647	+253	Won Championship
1969–70	22	17	0	5	.773	1,951	1,750	+201	Runner-up
1970–71	22	15	0	7	.682	1,930	1,685	+245	3rd place
1971–72	22	17	0	5	.773	1,986	1,832	+154	Won Championship
1972–73	26	20	0	6	.769	2,405	2,227	+178	Runner-up
1973–74	26	17	0	9	.654	2,381	2,221	+160	3rd place
1974–75	26	18	0	8	.692	2,381	2,474	+153	4th place
1975–76	26	13	0	13	.500	2,272	2,192	+80	5th place
1976–77	26	15	0	11	.577	2,416	2,267	+149	6th place
1977–78	26	12	0	14	.462	2,396	2,452	–56	8th place
1978–79	22	9	0	13	.409	1,951	2,052	–101	7th place
1979–80	22	11	0	11	.500	1,929	1,933	–4	5th place
1980–81	22	11	0	11	.500	2,159	2,129	+30	5th place
Totals	708	459	10	239	.648	56,000	51,494	+4506	

Source: Crvena zvezda

==== Standings (1981–1991) ====
Season	Regular season								Postseason							
Season	G	W	L	W–L%	PF	PA	PD	Finish	G	W	L	W–L%	PF	PA	PD	Result
1981–82	22	13	9	.591	2,148	2,049	+99	3rd	5	3	2	.600	480	452	+28	Lost in Semifinals
1982–83	22	14	8	.636	2,146	1,999	+147	4th	5	3	2	.600	477	435	+52	Lost in Semifinals
1983–84	22	14	8	.636	2,063	1,928	+135	2nd	8	5	3	.625	739	669	+70	Lost in Finals
1984–85	22	14	8	.636	2,108	1,940	+168	2nd	8	5	3	.625	739	743	–4	Lost in Finals
1985–86	22	10	12	.455	2,098	2,114	–16	8th	5	3	2	.600	509	527	−18	Lost in Quarterfinals
1986–87	22	15	7	.682	1,974	1,860	+114	4th	7	4	3	.571	618	633	–15	Lost in Finals
1987–88	22	10	12	.455	1,937	1,995	–95	6th	4	2	2	.500	378	380	−2	Lost in Quarterfinals
1988–89	22	14	8	.636	1,921	1,843	+78	4th	3	1	2	.333	272	289	−17	Lost in Semifinals
1989–90	22	17	5	.773	2,026	1,961	+65	2nd	7	3	4	.429	573	656	–83	Lost in Finals
1990–91	22	8	14	.364	1,942	2,047	−105	10th	6	5	1	.833	578	537	+41	Won Play-out League
Totals	220	129	91	.586	20,363	19,736	+627		58	34	24	.586	5,363	5,321	+42	

Source: Crvena zvezda

==== Positions by year ====
#	46	47	48	49	50	51	52	53	54	55	56	57	58	59	60	61	62	63	64	65	66	67	68	69	70	71	72	73	74	75	76	77	78	79	80	81	82	83	84	85	86	87	88	89	90	91
1	1	1	1	1	1	1	1	1	1	1														1			1																			
2														2											2			2											2	2		2			2	
3												3	3						3			3	3			3			3								3									
4											4										4									4								4						4		
5																															5				5	5										
6															6	6																6											6			
7																																		7												
8																	8	8		8													8								8					
9																																														9
10																																														
11																																														
12																																														
13																																														
14																																														

=== Serbia and Montenegro (1991–2006) ===
==== Standings ====
Season	Regular season								Postseason							
Season	G	W	L	W–L%	PF	PA	PD	Finish	G	W	L	W–L%	PF	PA	PD	Result
1991–92	22	15	7	.682	1,838	1,759	+79	2nd	6	2	4	.333	511	512	−1	Lost in Finals
1992–93	34	28	6	.824	3,265	2,916	+349	1st	7	5	2	.714	568	548	+20	Won Championship
1993–94	32	23	9	.719	2,929	2,743	+186	2nd	10	9	1	.900	930	805	+125	Won Championship
1994–95	28	20	8	.714	2,454	2,242	+212	3rd	5	2	3	.400	387	367	+20	Lost in Semifinals
1995–96	36	23	13	.639	2,945	2,708	+237	6th	3	1	2	.333	216	225	−9	Lost in Quarterfinals
1996–97	26	10	16	.385	2,042	2,100	-58	12th	Did not qualify							
1997–98	26	19	7	.731	2,168	1,968	+200	3rd	8	7	1	.875	596	547	+49	Won Championship
1998–99	22	19	3	.423	1,794	1,563	+231	2nd	Not played due to the NATO military operation							
1999–00	22	15	7	.682	1,696	1,601	+95	3rd	7	4	3	.571	565	534	+31	Lost in Semifinals
2000–01	22	8	14	.364	1,788	1,873	+85	10th	Did not qualify							
2001–02	22	10	12	.455	1,784	1,776	+8	7th	2	0	2	.000	143	168	−25	Lost in Quarterfinals
2002–03	22	16	6	.727	1,964	1,763	+201	3rd	5	2	3	.400	385	385	–4	Lost in Semifinals
2003–04	14	10	4	.714	1,250	1,172	+78	2nd	2	0	2	.000	141	144	–3	Lost in Semifinals
2004–05	14	9	5	.643	1,279	1,220	+59	4th	2	0	2	.000	154	195	–41	Lost in Semifinals
2005–06	10	9	1	.900	909	796	+113	1st	8	3	5	.375	604	631	–27	Lost in Finals
Totals	352	234	118	.665	30,105	28,200	+1,905		65	35	30	.538	5,200	5,061	+139	

Source: Crvena zvezda

==== Positions by year ====
#	92	93	94	95	96	97	98	99	00	01	02	03	04	05	06
1		1	1				1								
2	2							2							2
3				3					3			3	3		
4														4	
5															
6					6										
7											7				
8															
9															
10										10					
11															
12						12									
13															
14															

=== Serbia (2006–present) ===
==== Standings ====
Season	Regular season								Postseason							
Season	G	W	L	W–L%	PF	PA	PD	Finish	G	W	L	W–L%	PF	PA	PD	Result
2006–07	14	9	5	.643	1,275	1,211	+64	4th	6	3	3	.500	495	505	−10	Lost in Finals
2007–08	14	9	5	.643	1,220	1,172	+48	4th	2	0	2	.000	153	182	−29	Lost in Semifinals
2008–09	6	5	1	.833	505	437	+67	1st	8	5	3	.625	510	515	−5	Lost in Finals
2009–10	14	8	6	.571	1,168	1,121	+47	4th	2	0	2	.000	147	189	−32	Lost in Semifinals
2010–11	14	6	8	.429	1,226	1,249	−23	5th	did not qualify							
2011–12	14	9	5	.643	1,137	1,050	+87	3rd	7	3	4	.429	532	529	+6	Lost in Finals
2012–13	14	11	3	.786	1,143	1,015	+128	2nd	7	3	4	.429	482	497	−15	Lost in Finals
2013–14	14	11	3	.786	1,187	988	+199	2nd	6	3	3	.500	495	506	−11	Lost in Finals
2014–15	14	13	1	.929	1,233	995	+238	1st	8	6	2	.750	605	567	+38	Won Championship
2015–16	6	6	0	1.000	531	384	+147	1st	6	5	1	.833	494	409	+85	Won Championship
2016–17	14	13	1	.929	1,212	940	+272	1st	5	5	0	1.000	441	344	+97	Won Championship
2017–18	10	8	2	.800	903	735	+168	1st	7	7	0	1.000	615	500	+115	Won Championship
2018–19	10	10	1	1.000	854	630	+224	1st	6	5	1	.833	521	495	+26	Won Championship
2019–20	Canceled due to the COVID-19 pandemic															
2020–21	Not held								7	6	1	.857	600	471	+129	Won Championship
Totals	158	118	41	.742	13,594	11,927	+1,667		77	51	26	.662	6,090	5,709	+381	

==== Positions by year ====
#	07	08	09	10	11	12	13	14	15	16	17	18	19
1									1	1	1	1	1
2	2		2			2	2	2					
3													
4		4		4									
5					5								
6													
7													
8													
9													
10													
10													
12													

== Individual awards ==
=== Serbia and Montenegro ===
MVP

Number	Player	Season(s)	Ref.
1	(Serbia and Montenegro) Nebojša Ilić	1993	
1	(Serbia and Montenegro) Mileta Lisica	1994	

Most Improved Player

Number	Player	Season(s)	Ref.
1	(Serbia and Montenegro) Igor Rakočević	1998	

Young MVP

Number	Player	Season(s)	Ref.
1	(Serbia and Montenegro) Predrag Stojaković	1993	

=== Serbia ===
Super League MVP

Number	Player	Season(s)	Ref.
2	(Serbia) Boban Marjanović	2014, 2015	

Finals MVP

Number	Player	Season(s)	Ref.
2	(Serbia) Ognjen Dobrić	2017, 2021	
1	(Serbia) Milan Gurović	2007	
1	(United States) Omar Thomas	2012	
1	(Germany) Maik Zirbes	2016	
1	(Slovenia) Alen Omić	2018	
1	(United States) Billy Baron	2019	

== See also ==
- KK Crvena zvezda in the ABA League
