= Arijan Komazec =

Croatian basketball player (born 1970)

Personal information
- Born: January 23, 1970 (age 56) Zadar, SR Croatia, SFR Yugoslavia
- Listed height: 6 ft 7 in (2.01 m)
- Listed weight: 200 lb (91 kg)

Career information
- NBA draft: 1992: undrafted
- Playing career: 1986–2004
- Position: Shooting guard / small forward

Career history
- 1986–1992: Zadar
- 1992–1993: Panathinaikos
- 1993–1995: →Varese
- 1995–1997: Virtus Bologna
- 1997–1998: Varese
- 1998–1999: Olympiacos
- 1999–2000: Zadar
- 2001: AEK
- 2003–2004: Air Avellino

Career highlights
- Italian Super Cup winner (1995); Italian League Top Scorer (1995); Greek Cup winner (1993); Greek League All-Star (1998); Greek All-Star Game MVP (1998); Croatian Cup winner (2000)
Medals
Men's basketball
Representing Yugoslavia
World Cup
Gold medal – first place	1990 Argentina
EuroBasket
Gold medal – first place	1991 Italy
Goodwill Games
Gold medal – first place	1990 Seattle
European Championship for Junior men
Gold medal – first place	1988 Yugoslavia	Under-18
European Championship for Cadets
Gold medal – first place	1987 Hungary	Under-16
Representing Croatia
Olympic Games
Silver medal – second place	1992 Barcelona
World Cup
Bronze medal – third place	1994 Canada
EuroBasket
Bronze medal – third place	1993 Germany
Bronze medal – third place	1995 Greece

Arijan Komazec (born January 23, 1970) is a former Croatian professional basketball player.

== Professional career ==
Komazec started his professional career as a basketball player at the age of 16, in the historical club of Zadar, in the 1986–87 season. At the end of the previous 1985–86 season, Zadar had become the champions of the Yugoslav League, and had thus earned the right to participate in the FIBA European Champions Cup (EuroLeague). Komazec had great performances during the 1986–87 FIBA European Champions Cup season, and he led his team to the fourth place of the top 6 semifinal group stage. After six years in Zadar, where he became the absolute leader and scorer of his team, he made the big step in his career for the transcription of the Greek League (which was at that time the best national domestic league in Europe) and Panathinaikos, of the head coach Željko Pavličević and the Greek superstar Nikos Galis. There he found an old acquaintance from years of Zadar, Stojko Vranković, who had just returned from the NBA.

In a year that began with ambitions to win the championship, for Panathinaikos and him also, won only the 1993 Greek Cup, in a final against Sato Aris. Komazec, although he did some excellent performances, did not respond satisfactorily to Panathinaikos, who was preparing to make the fling at European level, and in the summer he was loaned to Cagiva Varese, where he played the next two seasons (1993–94 in A2 & 1994–95 A1), and made impressive performances.

The impression that he made by his performance in Varese, caused Buckler Beer Bologna, which was the dominant team of the Italian League the previous years, to buy his contract from Panathinaikos, and close a deal with him for the next two years, in an effort to replace the large void left in the team by Saša Danilović leaving for the NBA's Miami Heat. The Croatian star didn't succeed one more time to respond to the high demands of competitive sport at the top level, as he only won the smaller title of the Italian Supercup in 1995. This failure brought him back again to Varese the next year (1997–98), where rediscovered his best self, and with a scoring recital, he led the Lombardy team to the playoffs semifinals in the Italian League, and on the course to a participation in the EuroLeague, for the first time 20 years.

In the summer of 1998, came the third and final chance for Komazec to make an important achievement in a great club of European basketball, as he agreed to play for head coach Dušan Ivković, at Olympiacos. Arijan began the season doing very well, and everything indicated that the experiment for the player and the club could end up in achieving something good at the end of the season, when the major club titles, both in Greece and in Europe were contested. But an injury put him off of the court for half a month, and he became substantially off in his playing form, throughout the remaining part of the season. His participation at the 1999 FIBA EuroLeague Final Four, in Munich, was the only one in his short and essentially failed time at Olympiacos.

In the next season (1999–00), he returned to his roots, and he quite unexpectedly was joined in Zadar by Dino Rađa. Together, the duo led the Dalmatian club to the semifinals of the FIBA Saporta Cup, where they lost to the Greek club AEK. They won the Croatian Cup in the same season, which marked the last success of his career.

He was briefly a part of the NBA team the Vancouver Grizzlies, during the 2000–01 season, but he only spent one month with the team, and he did not play in any official NBA games with them.

== National team career ==
Komazec was a member of the senior Yugoslavian national team. With Yugoslavia, he won the gold medal at the 1990 FIBA World Championship. He also won the gold medal at the 1991 EuroBasket.

Komazec was also a member of the senior Croatian national team. With Croatia, he won the silver medal at the 1992 Summer Olympics. He also won bronze medals with Croatia at the 1993 EuroBasket and the 1995 EuroBasket.

== Personal life ==
His father is Milan Komazec, a former basketball player who won three Yugoslav First League championships (1965, 1967, and 1968) with Zadar. His uncle is Petar Popović, a former basketball player. His first-cousin is Alan Gregov, a former basketball player.
