= Marc Ostarcevic =

Croatian basketball player and coach

Personal information
- Born: 25 October 1941 (age 85) Zara, Kingdom of Italy (now Croatia)
- Listed height: 1.85 m (6 ft 1 in)
- Listed weight: 82 kg (181 lb)

Career information
- NBA draft: 1963: undrafted
- Playing career: 1958–1983
- Position: Shooting guard
- Number: 7
- Coaching career: 1977–1978

Career history

Playing
- 1959–1960: Zadar
- 1961–1962: Crvena zvezda
- 1963–1965: Zadar
- 1966–1983: Racing CF

Coaching
- 1977–1978: Racing CF

Career highlights
- As player: Yugoslav League champion (1965); French Second Division champion (1977); Jersey retired by Paris Racing CF

Marko Oštarčević (born 25 October 1941), also credited as Marc Ostarcevic, is a French-Croatian former professional basketball player and coach.

== Playing career ==
Ostarcevic started his playing career with his hometown team Zadar. In 1959, he joined first squad. In 1961, Ostarcevic signed with Belgrade-based team Crvena zvezda for two seasons. Following his departure from Belgrade, he returns to Zadar. He was a member of the 1965 Zadar roster led by Giuseppe Gjergja and Krešimir Ćosić that won the Yugoslav League title.

On 2 June 1964, Ostarcevic was a member of the SR Croatia republic team in a 110–65 lost to the NBA All-Stars team in Karlovac. Coached by Red Auerbach, the United States players were Bob Cousy, Tom Heinsohn, K. C. Jones, Jerry Lucas, Bob Pettit, Oscar Robertson, and Bill Russell, while the Croatian team members were Gjergja, Nemanja Đurić, Dragan Kovačić, Mirko Novosel, and Petar Skansi among others.

Ostarcevic went to France in 1966 where he played for Racing Club France. He retired as a player at age 42, with Racing in 1983. On 21 March 1971, he recorded 64 points in a 126–99 win over Graffenstaden.

== Coaching career ==
A player-coach, Ostarcevic was the head coach for Racing Club France during the 1977–78 season.

== Career achievements ==
As basketball player

- Yugoslav League champion: 1 (with Zadar: 1965)
- French Second Division champion: 1 (with Racing Club France: 1977)
- No. 7 retired by Paris Club France

== Personal life ==
His brother is Nedjeljko Oštarčević, a former basketball player. Nedjeljko won two Yugoslav League titles (1974, 1975) and a Yugoslav Cup (1970) with Zadar.

In France, Ostarcevic was married to Claudine with whom he has three children.

In 1983, Ostarcevic began a romantic relationship with a Spanish actress and presenter Norma Duval, with whom he had three children: Marc Iván (born 1984), Yelko (b. 1986), and Christian (b. 1994). Both were married on 10 February 1992 in Paris, and separated in October 2001, divorcing on 25 February 2003.

In 2003, Ostarcevic was a contestant in the La Isla de los FamoS.O.S. 2, finishing at the 3rd place.

In May 2019, Ostarcevic reveals that he has cancer.
