= Ratko Radovanović =

Serbian basketball player

Personal information
- Born: October 16, 1956 (age 70) Nevesinje, PR Bosnia-Herzegovina, FPR Yugoslavia
- Listed height: 2.11 m (6 ft 11 in)
- Listed weight: 107 kg (236 lb)

Career information
- Playing career: 1977–1990
- Position: Center
- Number: 9

Career history
- 1977–1983: Bosna
- 1983–1986: Stade Français
- 1986–1990: Reyer Venezia

Career highlights
- EuroLeague champion (1979); FIBA European Selection (1979); 3× Yugoslav League champion (1978, 1980, 1983); Yugoslav Cup winner (1978)
- FIBA Hall of Fame
Medals
Men's basketball
Representing Yugoslavia
Summer Olympics
Gold medal – first place	1980 Moscow	Team competition
Bronze medal – third place	1984 Los Angeles	Team competition
World Cup
Gold medal – first place	1978 Philippines	Team
Bronze medal – third place	1982 Colombia	Team
Bronze medal – third place	1986 Spain	Team
EuroBasket
Gold medal – first place	1977 Belgium	Team
Silver medal – second place	1981 Czechoslovakia	Team
Bronze medal – third place	1979 Italy	Team
Bronze medal – third place	1987 Greece	Team
European Championship for Juniors
Gold medal – first place	1974 France	Team
European Championship for Cadets
Bronze medal – third place	1973 Italy	Team

Ratko "Raša" Radovanović (Serbian Cyrillic: Ратко Радовановић; born 16 October 1956) is a Serbian former professional basketball player who competed for SFR Yugoslavia, at the 1980 Summer Olympics, and at the 1984 Summer Olympics.

In terms of the total number of medals with the Yugoslav national team at top international competitions (Olympics, World Championships, and EuroBasket), Radovanović is among the winningest Yugoslav basketball players. His nine medals with Yugoslavia, are only behind Krešimir Ćosić (14 medals), Dražen Dalipagić (12), and Dragan Kićanović and Vlade Divac (10 medals each).

== Early life ==
Born in the town of Nevesinje, PR Bosnia and Herzegovina, Radovanović, still an infant, was brought by his parents to Nikšić, PR Montenegro where he would spend the rest of his childhood.

It was in Nikšić that Radovanović, a tall and lanky kid, took up basketball on an informal, recreational basis in 1969. Soon after, in May 1970, the senior Yugoslav national team won the 1970 FIBA World Championship, resulting in an explosion of popularity for the sport throughout the country—a trend young Radovanović followed by beginning to practice a lot more seriously. It wasn't long before he was noticed by the Nikšić-born Bosna sports society general secretary Vukašin "Vule" Vukalović (1929–2000) who recommended the youngster to KK Bosna head coach Bogdan Tanjević.

== Club career ==
=== KK Bosna ===
Radovanović arrived to Sarajevo in October 1972, having just turned 16 years of age. Though officially part of the KK Bosna youth system, first team head coach Tanjević would already give him an odd first team run-out during the 1972-73 season, the club's first ever in the Yugoslav top-tier league.

Throughout the 1973-74 season, seventeen-year-old Radovanović recorded 17 first team appearances in the Yugoslav First League, scoring a total of 43 points (2.5 points per game).

During the 1974-75 season, the eighteen-year-old's continued improvement led to a permanent move to the first team. His league scoring average over the season reached 5.8 points per game.

== National team career ==
=== Youth ===
KK Bosna prospect Radovanović was selected by head coach Joša Gagel for the Yugoslav cadet (under-16) national team at the European Championship for Cadets, held in Italy during July 1973. The 16-year-old made a modest contribution to Yugoslavia's bronze medal effort with 2.2 points per game.

The following summer, he made the Yugoslav junior (under-18) squad at the European Championship for Juniors, in France, this time playing a much larger role on a team coached by Tanjević, his club head coach at Bosna. Radovanović contributed with 13.8 points per game, as the Yugoslav team — featuring Branko Skroče, Mihovil Nakić, Andro Knego, and Rajko Žižić, among others — won gold.

=== Senior ===
In July 1975, Radovanović, still only eighteen-years-old, made his full squad senior Yugoslav national team debut in a game versus Canada at Hala Pinki as part of the International Cup.

== Post-playing career ==
Right after retiring from playing basketball in 1990 in Venice, thirty-three-year-old Radovanović moved back to Sarajevo with his wife and their two young children. Returning to the city where he had previously lived for eleven years between 1972 and 1983 while with KK Bosna, he invested some of his earnings in healthcare by opening a private dental office.

Less than two years after that, the Bosnian War broke out and Radovanović and his family fled to Belgrade where he has been living ever since.

=== FMP Železnik sporting director ===
In 1996, Radovanović became the sporting director of FMP Železnik—a club that had just finished playing its first ever season in FR Yugoslavia's top-tier league — in the capacity. Working under the club's owner and president Nebojša Čović, Radovanović handled player personnel issues—helping FMP Železnik become a noted producer of basketball talent.

In the 1996–97 season, Radovanović's first with the club, FMP Železnik won the FR Yugoslavia Cup competition — its very first piece of silverware. However, instead of keeping the Cup-winning squad (that consisted of somewhat older players) intact, the club decided to sell them and turn to bringing up a generation of 17 and 18-year-olds from its youth system into the first team.

With Čović's financial support, Radovanović implemented a player development system in FMP that relied on identifying and acquiring talented teenagers from all over FR Yugoslavia / Serbia-Montenegro / Serbia during early stages of their basketball development, working with them within the club's system featuring academy-like facilities at the Belgrade suburb of Železnik where in addition to training they also lived and studied, and later selling them at a profit to bigger clubs. Players developed in the club during Radovanović's tenure include: Miloš Teodosić (sold in 2007 to Olympiakos for €1.2 million), Zoran Erceg (sold in 2008 to Olympiakos for €800,000), Aleksandar Rašić (sold in 2007 to Efes Pilsen for €400,000), Dejan Musli (sold in 2010 to Caja Laboral), Miroslav Raduljica (sold in 2010 to Efes Pilsen for €600,000), Mladen Šekularac (sold in 2002 to Virtus Bologna for €600,000), Dejan Milojević (sold in 2000 to KK Budućnost for €600,000), Ognjen Aškrabić (sold in 2004 to the newly established Dynamo Saint Petersburg for €550,000), Duško Savanović (sold in 2006 to UNICS Kazan for €500,000), Vladimir Radmanović and Mile Ilić (sold in 2001 to the Seattle SuperSonics and in 2006 to the New Jersey Nets, respectively, for the then fixed transfer fee of US$350,000 that the NBA franchises were paying to European clubs for players under contract).

After fourteen years at the club, Radovanović parted ways with FMP Železnik in 2010 at the beginning of the 2010–11 season.

In August 2017, following seven years away from basketball, Radovanović almost came back to the sport as KK Partizan's youth system director. The news of his return even got announced by the Serbian press outlets, however, nothing came of it in the end with Radovanović later revealing that negotiations with KK Partizan lasted over a month with no deal ultimately being made.

=== Sloboda Užice sporting director ===
On May 26, 2018, Radovanović became the sports director of Sloboda Užice, newly promoted member of the Basketball League of Serbia for the 2018-19 season.

=== Political activities ===
He became a member of Serbian Progressive Party in May 2023.
