= KK Zadar =

Basketball club in Zadar, Croatia

Zadar
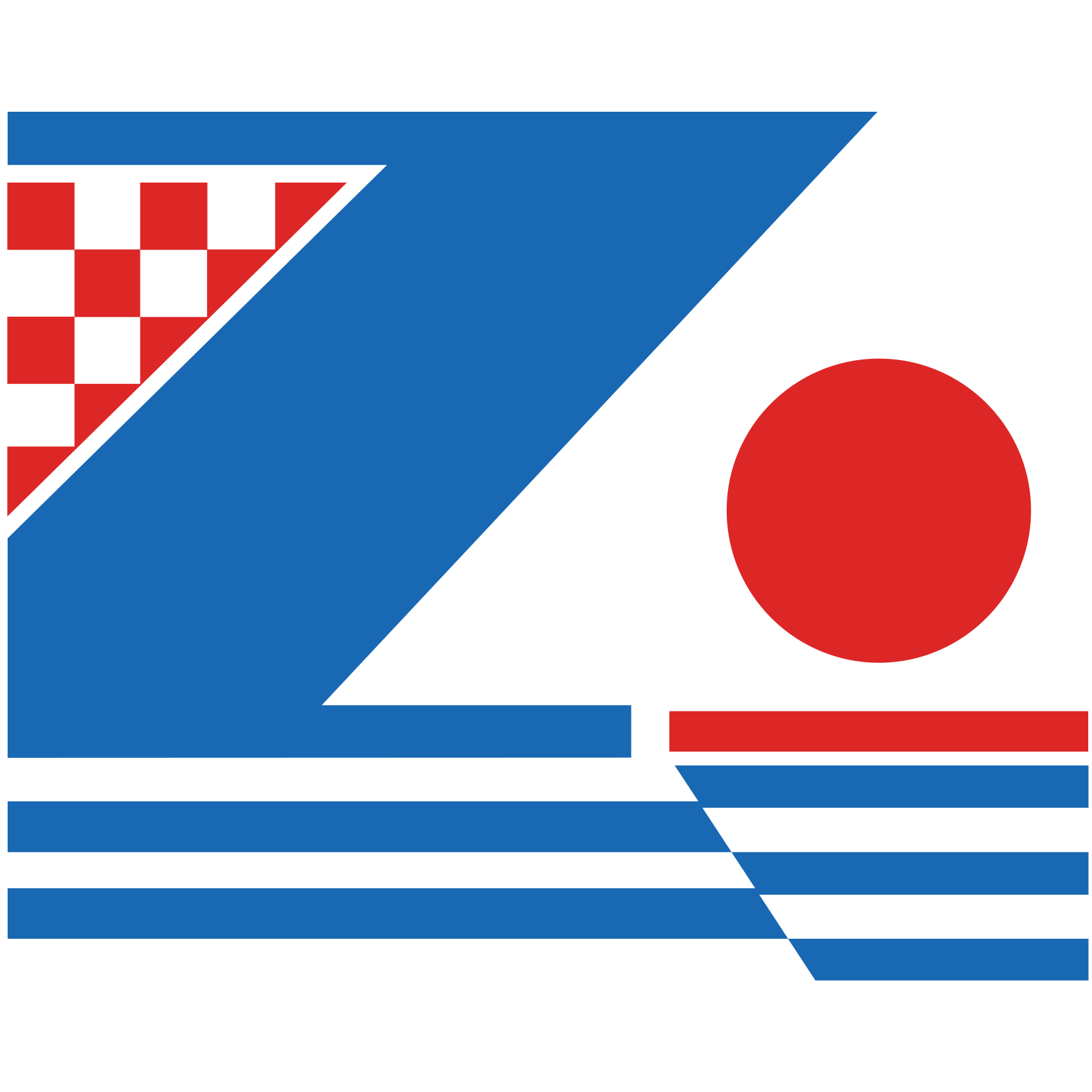
- Leagues: ABA League; Croatian League
- Founded: 1945; 80 years ago
- History: KK Zadar (1945–present)
- Arena: Krešimir Ćosić Hall
- Capacity: 8,500
- Location: Zadar, Croatia
- Team colors: Blue and white
- President: Davor Karlović
- General manager: Edi Nadarević
- Head coach: Stipe Modrić
- Championships: 6 Yugoslav Championships; 1 Yugoslav Cup; 6 Croatian Championships; 9 Croatian Cups; 1 Adriatic League
- Website: www.kkzadar.hr
Home	Away

Košarkaški klub Zadar (English: Zadar Basketball Club), commonly referred to as KK Zadar or simply Zadar, is a men's professional basketball club based in Zadar, Croatia. The club is a founding member and shareholder of the Adriatic Basketball Association, and competes in the ABA League and the Croatian League.

Zadar is the place where Croatian basketball was born in 1930. Zadar's reputation has been of a basketball hotbed with a team that can capture trophies at any given moment. Zadar is also known for its fanatical die hard supporters, Tornado Zadar.

== History ==
=== Early years ===
The first basketball ball and game rules of basketball were brought to Zadar by Italian soldiers during World War II. At that time all basketball games being played in Zadar were played on an outdoor, concrete court. KK Zadar was formally founded after World War II in 1945 as FD Zadar (Fiskulturno Društvo Zadar – Physical Culture Club of Zadar). Shortly after this club's founding, its basketball section went independent and became what is today's KK Zadar. Giuseppe "Pino" Giergia played his first game for Zadar in 1945; he later became one of the club's most famous players.

The 1949, KK Zadar entered Yugoslavia's first basketball division, remaining there until the country's break-up in 1990.

=== 1960–1970 ===
On November 28, 1964, Krešimir Ćosić played his first game for Zadar, while being only 16 years old.

In 1965 KK Zadar won a Yugoslav League national championship. They again became champions in 1967 and 1968. In that championship year, Kreso Cosic often knew to score even a 60 points per game. The club's new arena, Jazine, was built in 1968 in only 70 days. Also in 1966, Zadar played in the Euroleague final four; they were beaten in the semi-finals and ended the tournament in third place. In 1969 Krešo Ćosić left for the United States to play college basketball at Brigham Young University from 1971 to 1973.

=== 1970–1980 ===
In 1973, Zadar was almost relegated from the Yugoslav First Federal Basketball League. In this time of crisis, Krešo Ćosić returned to the club and with 36-year-old Giuseppe "Pino" Giergia Zadar once again became Yugoslav Champions, only to repeat this success one year later.

In 1976 Giuseppe Pino Giergia retired and Krešo Ćosić left the club to fulfill his obligations toward the Yugoslav Army (At this time, conscription was mandatory). During that time club was in a very difficult situation and once again were close to relegation. The club was once again saved by Krešo Ćosić who, after his military service, became the coach of Bresto in Italy. While he was the coach of Bresto he played basketball games for KK Zadar and once again saved the club from relegation.

=== 1980–1990 ===
In the 1981–82 season another legendary Zadar play made his debut: Stojko Vranković. During that season club has made it to the semifinals of FIBA Korać Cup. They repeated this success the very next season. In 1986 another milestone for the club was achieved: the club got its first world record holder, Zdenko Babić, who has scored 144 points against Apoel from Cyprus in the FIBA Korać Cup.

Arijan Komazec made his debut for Zadar in 1986, and he, along with Stojko Vranković, would play a crucial role in the years to follow. After 11 years of waiting, Zadar won its sixth national championship in 1986. In the finals of that year, KK Zadar met Cibona, and in a historic and legendary match, Zadar beat Cibona by 111:110. They won the game after two overtimes and thanks to an excellent performance by Petar Popović who scored 35 points. The importance of the victory is also reflected in the fact that Cibona had been undefeated for 1,371 days in the home venue in Zagreb until that defeat. In 1987 the club won fourth place in the FIBA European Champions Cup. In 1989 Krešo Ćosić and Giuseppe "Pino" Giergia took charge of the club.

=== 1990–2000 ===
Krešo Ćosić left the club in August 1990 because of a disagreement with the club leadership. Ćosić would never return to the club, and was soon diagnosed with cancer. He died shortly after, in 1995. In the first, newly founded, Croatian national championship, in the 1991–92 season, the club has played in the finals. That year club has also played in the Euroleague. They were the finalist of the national cup in the 1992–93 season.

In years to come the club began to stagnate in the national championship and in the European competitions. In 1996 with a new coach at the helm, Danijel Jusup, Zadar reached the playoffs of the national championship, where they lost to Cibona. They repeated this success the following year with Emilio Kovačić as Zadar's key player, yet Cibona won the title once again.

In 1998 Zadar won the Krešimir Ćosić Cup, Croatia's basketball cup competitions. Marko Popović, the son of Petar Popović made his debut in 1998 for Zadar at age 16. In the summer of the 1999 Arijan Komazec returned to Zadar from Olympiacos, and the club had also signed Dino Rađa from Panathinaikos. In the season 1999–2000 Zadar had won its 2nd Krešimir Ćosić cup and had played, once again, in the semifinals of national championship and Saporta cup. Dino Rađa and Arijan Komazec proved as crucial players for the success in that season.

=== 2000–present ===
In the seasons of 2000–01, 2001–02 Zadar played in the playoffs of national championship twice and once in Krešimir Ćosić Cup, yet they did not win any of the possible three titles. In the season of 2002–03 Danijel Jusup returned to the club as head coach. During that season, with Marko Popović as a lead player, Zadar won its third Krešimir Ćosić Cup, as well as the newly established regional ABA League, founded on the ashes of the Yugoslav league and containing the best teams from the former Yugoslav republics. Zadar beat Maccabi Tel Aviv in the final.

In the summer of 2003, Marko Popović left Zadar as Emilo Kovačić returned. Going into the ULEB Cup for a third season in 2004–05, Zadar once again missed the playoffs by a single win. In the season of 2004–05 Zadar finally won the Croatian national championship, after a 19-year wait. That season Zadar has also won their fourth Krešimir Ćosić Cup in a truly historical season. In 2006, they repeated their success from previous season in the Krešimir Ćosić Cup winning their fifth cup. Zadar returned to the national league final in each of the last two seasons, but KK Cibona stood on its way to another league title.

In 2008, Zadar became the Croatian champion for the second time, beating KK Split 3–2 in the best of five series. The final game of the series, which Zadar won 89 to 65, was the last game ever played at Jazine, affectionately called "The Temple of Croatian Basketball" by many fans and basketball aficionados.

Then after a long wait, season 2019/2020. Zadar won the Croatian Cup and was on its way to winning the Croatian Championship when the season was canceled due to COVID-19. The following year Zadar won yet another cup beating Split and finally won the championship again, again beating Split.

== Domestic league and cup winning rosters ==
- 1964–65: Vladimir Ćubrić, Đuro Stipčević, Miljenko Valčić, Marko Ostarčević, Bruno Marcelić, Jure Košta, Josip Đerđa, Petar Anić, Petar Jelić, Mile Marcelić, Krešimir Ćosić, Željko Troskot, Milan Komazec. Coach: Enzo Sovitti.
- 1966–67: Josip Đerđa, Krešimir Ćosić, Coach: Đorđo Zdrilić.
- 1968–69: Valčić, Stipčević, Laura, Komazec, Troskot, Košta, Giergia, Ćosić, G. Brajković, Bruno Marcelić, Mile Marcelić. Coach: Đorđo Zdrilić.
- Cup 1970: Vlado Vanjak, Đuro Stipčević, Goran Brajković, Bruno Marcelić, Milan Komazec, Pino Giergia, Vlado Gruškovnjak, Krešimir Ćosić, Nedjeljko-Mišo Ostarčević, Nikola Olujić, Petar Jelić. Coach: Trpimir Lokin.
- 1973–74: Branko Bakija, Jure Fabijanić, Bruno Marcelić, Čedomir Perinčić, Branko Skroče, Pino Giergia, Krešimir Ćosić, Zdravko Jerak and Tomislav Matulović. Coach: Lucijan Valčić
- 1974–75: Čedomir Perinčić, Jure Fabijanić, Boris Babić, Branko Bakija, Bruno Marcelić, Branko Šuljak, Pino Giergia, Krešimir Ćosić, Zdravko Jerak, Darko Fabulić, Nedjeljko Ostarčević, Tomislav Matulović, Branko Skroče, Josip-Pino Grdović, Bruno Petani, Žarko Bjedov. Coach: Lucijan Valčić, Trpimir Lokin, Leonard Bajlo.
- 1985–86: Darko Pahlić, Petar Popović, Milan Mlađan, Ante Matulović, Zdenko Babić, Dražen Blažević, Stojko Vranković, Veljko Petranović, Ivica Obad, Boris Hrabrov, Drago Čiklić i Arijan Komazec. Coach: Vlade Đurović

== Honours ==
Total titles: 23

=== Domestic competitions ===
- Croatian League

Winners (6): 2004–05, 2007–08, 2020–21, 2022–23, 2023–24, 2024–25
Runners-up (13): 1991–92, 1997–98, 1998–99, 1999–00, 2001–02, 2003–04, 2005–06, 2006–07, 2008–09, 2009–10, 2012–13, 2021–22, 2025–26

- Croatian Cup

Winners (9): 1997–98, 1999–00, 2002–03, 2004–05, 2005–06, 2006–07, 2019–20, 2020–21, 2023–24
Runners-up (8): 1992–93, 2000–01, 2001–02, 2003–04, 2010–11, 2014–15, 2015–16, 2025–26

- Yugoslav League (defunct)

Winners (6): 1965, 1967, 1967–68, 1973–74, 1974–75, 1985–86

- Yugoslav Cup (defunct)

Winners (1): 1969–70

=== European competitions ===
- EuroLeague

Semifinalists (2): 1967–68, 1974–75
4th place (1): 1986–87

- FIBA Saporta Cup (defunct)

Semifinalists (1): 1999–00

- FIBA Korać Cup (defunct)

Semifinalists (3): 1981–82, 1982–83, 1988–89

=== Regional competitions ===
- Adriatic League

Winners (1): 2002–03

=== Other competitions ===
- FIBA International Christmas Tournament (defunct)

4th place (1): 1999

== Top performances in European & worldwide competitions ==
Season	Achievement	Notes
EuroLeague
1965–66	Quarter-finals	4th place in a group with CSKA Moscow, AEK and CSKA Cherveno zname
1967–68	Semi-finals	eliminated by Real Madrid, 62-76 (L) in Madrid and 65-68 (L) in Zadar
1968–69	Quarter-finals	3rd place in a group with Real Madrid, CSKA Moscow and Academic
1974–75	Semi-finals	eliminated by Real Madrid, 82-109 (L) in Madrid and 117-130 (L) in Zadar
1975–76	Quarter-finals	6th place in a group with Mobilgirgi Varese, ASVEL, Maes Pils, Academic & Turun NMKY
1986–87	Semi-final group stage	4th place in a group with Tracer Milano, Maccabi Tel Aviv, Orthez, Žalgiris & Real Madrid
FIBA Saporta Cup
1970–71	Quarter-finals	eliminated by Spartak Leningrad, 59-63 (L) in Zadar and 78-98 (L) in Leningrad
1979–80	Quarter-finals	3rd place in a group with Emerson Varese, FC Barcelona and Eczacıbaşı
1993–94	Quarter-finals	5th place in a group with Pitch Cholet, Sato Aris, Hapoel Galil Elyon, Overense Aerosoles & Levski Sofia
1999–00	Semi-finals	eliminated by AEK, 75-70 (W) in Zadar and 67-82 (L) in Athens
FIBA Korać Cup
1981–82	Semi-finals	eliminated by Limoges CSP, 92-84 (W) in Zadar and 78-99 (L) in Limoges
1982–83	Semi-finals	eliminated by Šibenka, 78-70 (W) in Zadar and 69-89 (L) in Šibenik
1988–89	Semi-finals	eliminated by Partizan, 63-75 (L) in Belgrade and 84-88 (L) in Zadar
1990–91	Quarter-finals	eliminated by Mulhouse, 84-84 (D) in Zadar and 67-80 (L) in Mulhouse
1991–92	Quarter-finals	eliminated by Fórum Filatélico Valladolid, 80-95 (L) in Trieste and 91-83 (W) in Valladolid
EuroCup
2002–03	Quarter-finals	eliminated by Pamesa Valencia, 84-105 (L) in Valencia and 93-80 (W) in Zadar
2008–09	Quarter-finals	eliminated by Iurbentia Bilbao, 67–76 in Turin
Adriatic League
2002–03	Champions	defeated Maccabi Tel Aviv, 91–88 in the final of the Adriatic League in Ljubljana

== Season by season ==
=== In Yugoslavia ===
Season	Yugoslav First League	Pos	(Pos) (Note: Playoffs were not organized until the 1981–82 season)	Yugoslav Cup	tier European competition	
1945	1946 Yugoslav League	DNP	—N/a	—N/a	—N/a	
1946	1946 Yugoslav League	Runners-up	—N/a	—N/a	—N/a	
1947	1947 Yugoslav League	Runners-up	—N/a	—N/a	—N/a	
1948	1948 Yugoslav League	DNP	—N/a	—N/a	—N/a	
1949	1949 Yugoslav League	DNP	—N/a	—N/a	—N/a	
1950	1950 Yugoslav League	7th	—N/a	—N/a	—N/a	
1951	1952 Yugoslav League	4th	—N/a	—N/a	—N/a	
1952	1951 Yugoslav League	3rd	—N/a	—N/a	—N/a	
1953	1953 Yugoslav League	DNP	—N/a	—N/a	—N/a	
1954	1954 Yugoslav League	DNP	—N/a	—N/a	—N/a	
1955	1955 Yugoslav League	DNP	—N/a	—N/a	—N/a	
1956	1956 Yugoslav League	DNP	—N/a	—N/a	—N/a	
1957	1957 Yugoslav League	DNP	—N/a	—N/a	—N/a	
1958	1958 Yugoslav League	4th	—N/a	—N/a	DNP	
1959	1959 Yugoslav League	5th	—N/a	?	DNP	
1960	1960 Yugoslav League	3rd	—N/a	?	DNP	
1961	1961 Yugoslav League	4th	—N/a	—N/a	DNP	
1962	1962 Yugoslav League	3rd	—N/a	?	DNP	
1963	1963 Yugoslav League	5th	—N/a	—N/a	DNP	
1964	1964 Yugoslav League	Runners-up	—N/a	—N/a	DNP	
1965	1965 Yugoslav League	Champions	—N/a	—N/a	DNP	
1966	1966 Yugoslav League	3rd	—N/a	—N/a	1 European Champions Cup	QF
1967	1967 Yugoslav League	Champions	—N/a	—N/a	DNP	
1967–68	1967–68 Yugoslav League	Champions	—N/a	—N/a	1 European Champions Cup	SF
1968–69	1968–69 Yugoslav League	4th	—N/a	?	1 European Champions Cup	QF
1969–70	1969–70 Yugoslav League	6th	—N/a	Champions	DNP	
1970–71	1970–71 Yugoslav League	7th	—N/a	?	2 European Cup Winners' Cup	QF
1971–72	1971–72 Yugoslav League	10th	—N/a	?	DNP	
1972–73	1972–73 Yugoslav League	9th	—N/a	?	DNP	
1973–74	1973–74 Yugoslav League	Champions	—N/a	?	DNP	
1974–75	1974–75 Yugoslav League	Champions	—N/a	?	1 European Champions Cup	SF
1975–76	1975–76 Yugoslav League	8th	—N/a	?	1 European Champions Cup	QF
1976–77	1976–77 Yugoslav League	11th	—N/a	?	DNP	
1977–78	1977–78 Yugoslav League	6th	—N/a	?	DNP	
1978–79	1978–79 Yugoslav League	10th	—N/a	Runners-up	DNP	
1979–80	1979–80 Yugoslav League	6th	—N/a	?	2 European Cup Winners' Cup	QF
1980–81	1980–81 Yugoslav League	3rd	—N/a	?	3 Korać Cup	T16
1981–82	1981–82 Yugoslav League	Semifinalists	4th	?	3 Korać Cup	SF
1982–83	1982–83 Yugoslav League	6th	6th	?	3 Korać Cup	SF
1983–84	1983–84 Yugoslav League	Semifinalists	3rd	?	3 Korać Cup	T16
1984–85	1984–85 Yugoslav League	Semifinalists	3rd	?	3 Korać Cup	2R
1985–86	1985–86 Yugoslav League	Champions	2nd	?	3 Korać Cup	T16
1986–87	1986–87 Yugoslav League	Quarterfinalists	7th	?	1 European Champions Cup	SF
1987–88	1987–88 Yugoslav League	Quarterfinalists	5th	?	DNP	
1988–89	1988–89 Yugoslav League	5th	5th	?	3 Korać Cup	SF
1989–90	1989–90 Yugoslav League	Semifinalists	3rd	?	3 Korać Cup	T16
1990–91	1990–91 Yugoslav League	Semifinalists	4th	?	3 Korać Cup	QF

=== In Croatia ===
Season	Croatian League	Pos(Pos)	Croatian Cup	Adriatic League	tier European competitions	
1992	1992 Croatian League	Runners-up (2nd)	4th place	—N/a	3 Korać Cup	QF
1992–93	1992–93 Croatian League	Quarterfinalists (4th)	Runners-up	—N/a	1 European League	T16
1993–94	1993–94 Croatian League	8th place (5th)	4th place	—N/a	2 European Cup	T12
1994–95	1994–95 Croatian League	Quarterfinals (6th)	Last 16	—N/a		
1995–96	1995–96 Croatian League	DNQ (9th)	4th place	—N/a		
1996–97	1996–97 Croatian League	Quarterfinals (4th)	Last 16	—N/a	2 EuroCup	3R
1997–98	1997–98 Croatian League	Runners-up (2nd)	Champions	—N/a	3 Korać Cup	2R
1998–99	1998–99 Croatian League	Runners-up (1st)	Semifinalists	—N/a	1 EuroLeague	2R
1999–2000	1999–2000 Croatian League	Runners-up (1st)	Champions	—N/a	2 Saporta Cup	SF
2000–01	2000–01 Croatian League	Semifinalists (4th)	Runners-up	—N/a	1 EuroLeague	RS
2001–02	2002–03 Croatian League	Runners-up (2nd)	Runners-up	7th	1 EuroLeague	RS
2002–03	2002–03 Croatian League	Semifinalists (3rd)	Champions	Champions	2 ULEB Cup	QF
2003–04	2003–04 Croatian League	Runners-up (2nd)	Runners-up	8th	2 ULEB Cup	RS
2004–05	2004–05 Croatian League	Champions (1st)	Champions	Quarterfinalists	2 ULEB Cup	RS
2005–06	2005–06 Croatian League	Runners-up (2nd)	Champions	Quarterfinalists	3 EuroCup	T16
2006–07	2006–07 Croatian League	Runners-up (2nd)	Champions	7th		
2007–08	2007–08 Croatian League	Champions (1st)	Semifinalists	Semifinalists	2 ULEB Cup	T16
2008–09	2008–09 Croatian League	Runners-up (2nd)	Semifinalists	5th	2 EuroCup	QF
2009–10	2009–10 Croatian League	Runners-up (2nd)	Semifinalists	8th	2 EuroCup	RS
2010–11	2010–11 Croatian League	Semifinalists (2nd)	Runners-up	14th	3 EuroChallenge	T16
2011–12	2011–12 Croatian League	Semifinalists (4th)	Semifinalists			
2012–13	2012–13 Croatian League	Runners-up (2nd)	Semifinalists	12th		
2013–14	2013–14 Croatian League	Semifinalists (3rd)	Semifinalists	13th		
2014–15	2014–15 Croatian League	Semifinalists (3rd)	Runners-up	8th		
2015–16	2015–16 Croatian League	Semifinalists (3rd)	Runners-up	6th		
2016–17	2016–17 Croatian League	Quarterfinalists (5th)	Semifinalists	12th		
2017–18	2017–18 Croatian League	Semifinalists (2nd)	Semifinalists	6th		
2018–19	2018–19 Croatian League	Semifinalists (1st)	Semifinalists	11th		
2019–20	2019–20 Croatian League	cancelled	Champions	cancelled		
2020–21	2020–21 Croatian League	Champions (1st)	Champions	10th		
2021–22	2021–22 Croatian League	Runners-up (3rd)	Semifinalists	12th		
2022–23	2022–23 Croatian League	Champions (2nd)	Quarterfinalists	Quarterfinalists		
2023–24	2023–24 Croatian League	Champions (1st)	Champions	Quarterfinalists		
2024–25	2024–25 Croatian League	Champions (1st)	Quarterfinalists	9th		
2025–26	2025–26 Croatian League	Runners-up (1st)	Runners-up	Play-in		

== Home courts ==
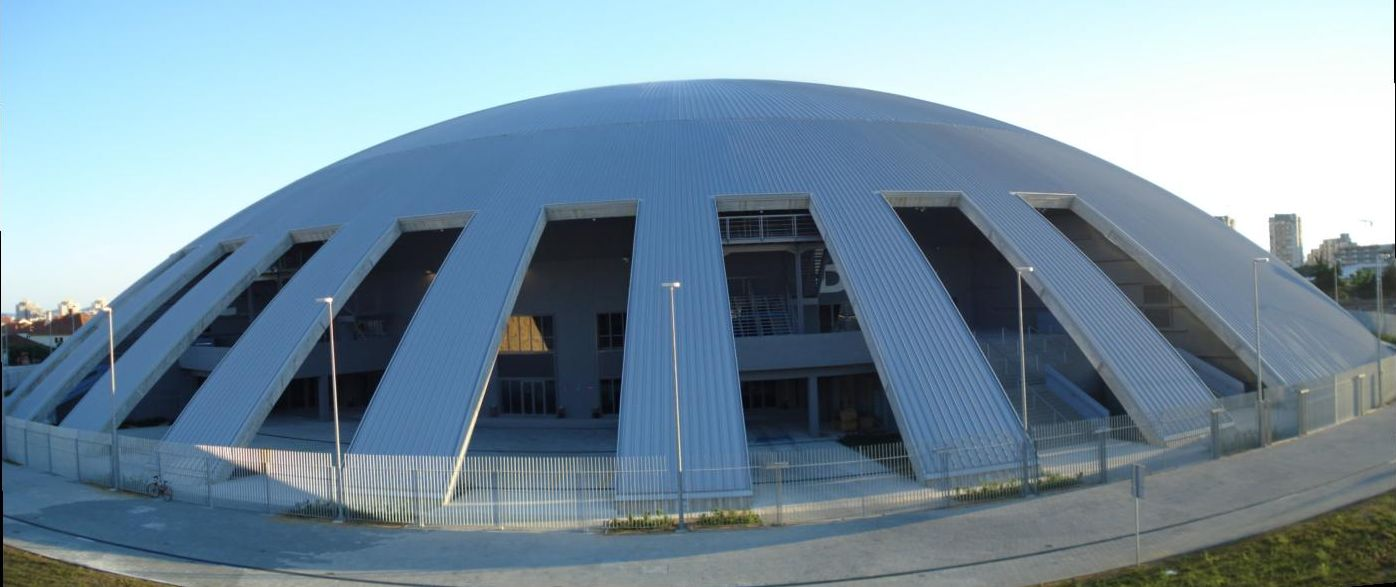
Krešimir Ćosić Hall

Court	Capacity	Period
Jazine Basketball Hall	3,000	1968–2008
Krešimir Ćosić Hall	8,500	2008–present

== Players ==
=== Current roster ===
Note: Flags indicate national team eligibility at FIBA-sanctioned events. Players may hold other non-FIBA nationalities not displayed.

KK Zadar roster
Players
Coaches

Pos.	No.	Nat.	Name	Ht.	Age
G	0	(United States)	Williams, Ross	1.80 m (5 ft 11 in)	26 – 17 July 2000
G	1	(Montenegro)	Mihailović, Vladimir	1.95 m (6 ft 5 in)	36 – 10 August 1990
G	5	(Croatia)	Bičić, Luka	1.77 m (5 ft 10 in)	19 – 2 October 2007
F	6	(Croatia)	Klarica, Krševan	2.00 m (6 ft 7 in)	22 – 10 November 2003
F	7	(Croatia)	Drežnjak, Dario	2.04 m (6 ft 8 in)	28 – 24 March 1998
C	8	(Croatia)	Buljević, Lovro	2.10 m (6 ft 11 in)	28 – 12 August 1998
C	9	(Croatia)	Vraneš, Ivan	2.07 m (6 ft 9 in)	30 – 29 May 1996
G/F	12	(Croatia)	Šare, Niko	1.96 m (6 ft 5 in)	21 – 20 April 2005
G/F	14	(Croatia)	Jerak, Luka	1.95 m (6 ft 5 in)	17 – 14 October 2009
G	15	(Croatia)	Mirčeta, Andro	1.86 m (6 ft 1 in)	20 – 11 August 2006
F/C	17	(United States)	Ogden Jr., Mark	2.08 m (6 ft 10 in)	32 – 7 October 1994
PF	23	(Croatia)	Brajković, Luka	2.04 m (6 ft 8 in)	18 – 3 October 2008
F	25	(Croatia)	Dundović, Manuel	1.93 m (6 ft 4 in)	20 – 25 October 2005
F	27	(Croatia)	Vučić, Ivan	1.98 m (6 ft 6 in)	29 – 26 October 1996
SF	46	(Croatia)	Ramljak, Marko	2.01 m (6 ft 7 in)	33 – 14 March 1993

Head coach

- (Croatia) Stipe Modrić

Assistant coach(es)

- (Croatia) Toni Dijan
- (Croatia) Ivan Barančić
- (Croatia) Boris Kovačević

Strength & conditioning coach(es)

- (Croatia) Bernard Kotlar

Physician(s)

- (Croatia) Mladen Srzentić

Physiotherapist(s)

- (Croatia) Šime Gulan

Legend

- (C) Team captain
- Injured

- Roster
Updated: September 15, 2026

=== Depth chart ===
Pos.	Starting 5	Bench 1	Bench 2
C	Mark Ogden Jr.	Lovro Buljević	Ivan Vraneš
PF	Dario Drežnjak	Krševan Klarica	Luka Brajković
SF	Marko Ramljak	Ivan Vučić	Manuel Dundović
SG	Vladimir Mihailović	Niko Šare	Luka Jerak
PG	Ross Williams	Andro Mirčeta	Luka Bičić

== Notable players ==
Note: Flags indicate national team eligibility at FIBA-sanctioned events. Players may hold other non-FIBA nationalities not displayed.

Criteria

To appear in this section a player must have either:

- Set a club record or won an individual award while at the club
- Played at least one official international match for their national team at any time
- Played at least one official NBA match at any time.

1940s

- (Socialist Federal Republic of Yugoslavia) Tullio Rochlitzer

1950s

- (Socialist Federal Republic of Yugoslavia) Marko Ostarčević

1960s

- (Socialist Federal Republic of Yugoslavia) Josip Gjergja
- (Socialist Federal Republic of Yugoslavia) Bruno Marcelić
- (Socialist Federal Republic of Yugoslavia) Marko Ostarčević
- (Socialist Federal Republic of Yugoslavia) Đuro Stipčević
- (Socialist Federal Republic of Yugoslavia) Željko Troskot

1970s

- (Socialist Federal Republic of Yugoslavia) Krešimir Ćosić
- (Socialist Federal Republic of Yugoslavia) Zdravko Jerak
- (Socialist Federal Republic of Yugoslavia) Tomislav Matulović
- (Socialist Federal Republic of Yugoslavia) Nedjeljko Ostarčević
- (Socialist Federal Republic of Yugoslavia) Čedomir Perinčić
- (United States) Douglas Richards
- (Socialist Federal Republic of Yugoslavia) Branko Skroče
- (Socialist Federal Republic of Yugoslavia) Ferit Zekolli

1980s

- (Socialist Federal Republic of Yugoslavia) Zdenko Babić
- (Socialist Federal Republic of Yugoslavia) Draženko Blažević
- (Socialist Federal Republic of Yugoslavia) Dragomir Čiklić
- (Socialist Federal Republic of Yugoslavia) Boris Hrabrov
- (Socialist Federal Republic of Yugoslavia) Ante Matulović
- (Socialist Federal Republic of Yugoslavia) Milan Mlađan
- (Socialist Federal Republic of Yugoslavia) Ivica Obad
- (Socialist Federal Republic of Yugoslavia) Darko Pahlić
- (Socialist Federal Republic of Yugoslavia) Veljko Petranović
- (Socialist Federal Republic of Yugoslavia) Petar Popović
- (Socialist Federal Republic of Yugoslavia) Ivan Sunara
- (Croatia) Stojko Vranković

1990s

- (Serbia and Montenegro) Dejan Bodiroga
- (Croatia) Alan Gregov
- (Croatia) Arijan Komazec
- (Croatia) Emilio Kovačić
- (Croatia) Ivica Marić
- (Croatia) Aramis Naglić
- (Croatia) Dino Rađa
- (Croatia) Jurica Ružić
- (Croatia) Stipe Šarlija
- (Croatia) Josip Vranković

2000s

- (Croatia) Marko Banić
- (Georgia (country)) Vladimir Boisa
- (United States) Corey Brewer
- (Canada) Carl English
- (United States) Desmon Farmer
- (United States) Marlon Garnett
- (North Macedonia) Todor Gečevski
- (Slovenia) Jurica Golemac
- (United States) Julius Johnson
- (Bulgaria) Dejan Ivanov
- (Croatia) Jure Lalić
- (Croatia) Davor Marcelić
- (United States) Michael McDonald
- (United States) Michael Meeks
- (United States) Dean Oliver
- (Croatia) Davor Pejčinović
- (Croatia) Hrvoje Perić
- (Croatia) Hrvoje Perinčić
- (Croatia) Marko Popović
- (Croatia) Damir Rančić
- (Croatia) Rumeal Robinson
- (Croatia) Tomislav Ružić
- (Croatia) Rok Stipčević
- (Croatia) Damir Tvrdić
- (Croatia) Jakov Vladović

2010s

- (Croatia) Miro Bilan
- (Croatia) Ante Delaš
- (United States) James Florence
- (Croatia) Ive Ivanov
- (Serbia) Ivan Marinković
- (Bosnia and Herzegovina) Jusuf Nurkić
- (Croatia) Darko Planinić
- (Croatia) Ivan Ramljak
- (Bosnia and Herzegovina) Marko Šutalo
- (United States) Romeo Travis
- (Croatia) Luka Žorić

2020s

- (Croatia) Dominik Mavra
- (Croatia) Luka Božić
- (United States) Chinanu Onuaku
- (Montenegro) Vladimir Mihailović

== Head coaches ==
- (Croatia) Ivica Burić
- (Serbia) Vlade Đurović
- (Croatia) Rudolf Jugo
- (Croatia) Danijel Jusup
- (Croatia) Veljko Mršić
- (Croatia) Aleksandar Petrović
- (Slovenia) Zmago Sagadin
- (Croatia) Enzo Sovitti
- (Croatia) Luciano Valčić
- (Croatia) Vlado Vanjak

== Members of the Basketball Hall of Fame ==
- (Croatia) Krešimir Ćosić
- (Croatia) Dino Rađa
