= Nemanja Đurić =

Serbian basketball player and coach (1936–2025)

Personal information
- Born: 18 June 1936 Belgrade, Kingdom of Yugoslavia
- Died: 7 August 2025 (aged 89)
- Listed height: 1.95 m (6 ft 5 in)
- Listed weight: 93 kg (205 lb)

Career information
- NBA draft: 1958: undrafted
- Playing career: 1955–1972
- Positions: Power forward, center
- Number: 11, 14
- Coaching career: 1969–1976

Career history

Playing
- 1955: Crvena zvezda
- 1956–1965: Radnički Belgrade
- 1967–1968: Noalex Venezia
- 1968–1970: Crvena zvezda
- 1970–1972: Oriolik Sl. Brod
- 1972–1973: Željezničar Sarajevo

Coaching
- 1969–1970: Crvena zvezda Youth
- 1970–1972: Oriolik Sl. Brod (player-coach)
- 1972–1973: Željezničar Sarajevo (player-coach)
- 1973–1974: Crvena zvezda (assistant)
- 1974–1976: Crvena zvezda

Career highlights
- As player: Yugoslav League champion (1969); As coach: Yugoslav Cup winner (1975)
Medals
Men's basketball
Representing Yugoslavia
FIBA World Championship
| Silver medal – second place | 1963 Brasil | Team |
| Silver medal – second place | 1967 Uruguay | Team |
EuroBasket
| Silver medal – second place | 1961 Yugoslavia | Team |
| Bronze medal – third place | 1963 Poland | Team |
| Silver medal – second place | 1965 Soviet Union | Team |
Mediterranean Games
| Gold medal – first place | 1959 Lebanon | Team |

Nemanja Đurić (Serbian Cyrillic: Немања Ђурић; 18 June 1936 – 7 August 2025) was a Serbian professional basketball player and coach. He represented the Yugoslavia national basketball team internationally.

== Early life ==
Đurić was raised in a sports family. His father and uncle played football for Slavija in Belgrade. He trained many sports, played football for Šumadija Belgrade, after which he moved to handball club Hero, and later moved to volleyball club Partizan where he stayed for a longer period and played for all youth selections. Đurić started to play basketball at the urging of his friend Slobodan Ivković.

== Playing career ==
Đurić made his first basketball steps in Crvena zvezda when he was 19. The club felt that he was too old; so he went to Radnički Belgrade.

Đurić played in Italy for Noalex Venezia in 1967–68 season. After that he return to Crvena zvezda and won Yugoslav League in 1968–69 season along with Vladimir Cvetković, Zoran Slavnić, Dragan Kapičić, Ljubodrag Simonović and others. Also, he played in 1969–70 European Champions Cup. Later, he played for Oriolik from Slavonski Brod.

== National team career ==
As a player for the Yugoslavia national basketball team Đurić played from 1959 to 1967. He participated in two FIBA World Championships (1963 in Brazil and 1967 in Uruguay) and four European Championships (1959 in Turkey, 1961 in Yugoslavia, 1963 in Poland and 1965 in Soviet Union) and two Summer Olympics (1960 in Rome and 1964 in Tokyo). Đurić won two silver medals at World Championships, two silver medals in 1961 and 1965) and one bronze (1963) at European Championships. He won a gold medal at 1959 Mediterranean Games in Lebanon.

During late May and early June 1964, Đurić faced off against a team of NBA All-Stars at three of their four games in Yugoslavia — on 29 May and 30 May 1964 in Belgrade as well as 2 June 1964 in Karlovac. In Karlovac, the team consisting of local players lost 65–110. US players coached by Red Auerbach were Bob Cousy, Tom Heinsohn, K. C. Jones, Jerry Lucas, Bob Pettit, Oscar Robertson and Bill Russel. Alongside Đurić, the players on the local team were Giuseppe Gjergja, Mirko Novosel, Petar Skansi and others.

== Coaching career ==
Đurić was an assistant coach of the Crvena zvezda roster that won the 1974 European Cup Winners' Cup, assisting to Aleksandar Nikolić.

Đurić was the head coach of Crvena zvezda for two seasons between 1974 and 1976, winning one Yugoslav Cup in 1975.

== Death ==
Đurić died on 7 August 2025, at the age of 89.

== Career achievements ==
As player

- Yugoslav League champion: 1 (with Crvena zvezda: 1968–69).

As head coach

- Yugoslav Cup winner: 1 (with Crvena zvezda: 1974–75).

As assistant coach

- European Cup Winners' Cup winner: 1 (with Crvena zvezda: 1973–74).

== Coaching record ==
Yugoslav Basketball League

| Team | Year | G | W | L | W–L% | Result |
|---|---|---|---|---|---|---|
| Crvena zvezda | 1974–75 | 26 | 18 | 8 | .692 | 4th |
| Crvena zvezda | 1975–76 | 26 | 13 | 13 | .500 | 5th |
| Career | | 52 | 31 | 21 | .596 | |

== See also ==
- List of Red Star Belgrade basketball coaches
- Yugoslavia at the 1959 Mediterranean Games
