= Skroce =

Skroce is a surname. Notable people with the surname include:

- Branko Skroče (born 1955), Croatian basketball player
- Steve Skroce, Canadian comic book and film storyboard artist of Croatian descent
