= Zdenko Babić =

Croatian basketball player

Zdenko Babić (born c. 1960) is a retired Croatian basketball player. He is best known for scoring 144 points in a single game, a record in FIBA-sanctioned competition.

On 10 October 1985, Babić scored 144 points playing for KK Zadar in a game of the 1985–86 Korać Cup against APOEL B.C. of Cyprus. The first game of the two-legged tie between the two clubs had been won by KK Zadar with the score of 121–40. This gave Zadar's coach Vlade Đurović an idea of attempting to surpass the then-recent Yugoslav First League record of 112 points in a game, set by Dražen Petrović. He proposed this idea to Petar Popović, the club's top scorer, but he declined, and so did the other Zadar's leading players. Babić, Zadar's sixth man, ultimately accepted the task of record-breaking. When the game started, the local crowd quickly realized what was going on and enthusiastically cheered Babić on whenever he scored. He needed only 26 minutes to reach 113 points, ending with a total of 144. The game's final score was 192–116.

Babić won the 1985–86 Yugoslav Championship with KK Zadar. Later in his career, Babić played with KK Gradine in Pula and Beauregard BC, with whom he won the Swiss Championship.

== See also ==
- List of basketball players who have scored 100 points in a single game
