= Enzo Sovitti =

Dalmatian Italian-Yugoslav basketball player and coach

Personal information
- Born: 1926 Zara, Kingdom of Italy (Today Zadar, Croatia)
- Died: 9 February 1969 (aged 43) Split, Yugoslavia

Career information
- Playing career: 1945–1953
- Position: Head coach
- Coaching career: 1953–1969

Career history

Playing
- 1945–1953: Zadar

Coaching
- 1953–1966: Zadar
- 1966–1969: Split

Career highlights
- Yugoslav League champion (1965)

Enzo Sovitti (1926 – 1969) was a Dalmatian Italian-Yugoslav basketball player and coach. Sovitti discovered several basketball talents, such as Krešimir Ćosić, who was launched by Sovitti at fourteen years old in 1962. Although he is considered one of the legends of KK Zadar, Sovitti is mostly unknown today. He is credited with making Zadar from a small Dalmatian club into "a European basketball giant." Enzo Sovitti is credited with discovering some of the greatest basketball talents in Croatia. He is said to have made "an immeasurable contribution to the development of Zadar and Croatian basketball, and his name has permanent place among the biggest names in [Croatian] and European basketball."

== Early life ==
He was born in Zadar (Zara) to an Italian father and a mother originally from Biograd na Moru (Zaravecchia). His father Renato was the owner of a famous butcher's shop in Zadar. He attended Italian language school, where he got involved with basketball.

On 26 April 1945 he was among the founders of the basketball section of FD Zadar, which on 9 February 1951 became KK Zadar. He was elected first president of Zadar's basketball team, but at the same time continued to play. He played for Zadar from 1945 until 1953, playing for it in the club's first official game against Zagreb on 17 August 1945, which Zadar won 25–16.

In 1948 he started working for the youth sector and later became the team's coach, creating a "new and rejuvenated Zadar," and discovering such talents as Željko Roskot, Vele Čubrić, Franko-Zuba Jurišić, Giuseppe Giergia and Krešimir Ćosić.

In 1953 Zadar was relegated to the second tier of Yugoslav basketball. However, in 1957, with Sovitti as coach, it achieved promotion to the first league, and in 1965, coached by Sovitti, won its first title.

Just before winning the title with Zadar, Sovitti had discovered Krešimir Ćosić, whom he made debut at just 14 years old.

After winning the 1965 league with Zadar, he moved to Split in 1966, which was interested in his "skills as a coach and talent scout." He coached Split until his death, and while he didn't win any titles, the players discovered by Sovitti granted Split to become highly successful in the following years, after his demise. Sovitti had been sick for some years but didn't heed his symptoms. He fell ill during the match Jugoplastika-Olimpija Ljubljana on 9 February 1969 and was carried to the hospital, where he died a few hours later. He was 43 years old.
