= 1985–86 Yugoslav First Basketball League =

Yugoslav First Basketball League
- League: Yugoslav First Basketball League
- Sport: Basketball

Regular season
- Season champions: Cibona

Playoffs
- Finals champions: Zadar
- Runners-up: Cibona

Yugoslav First Basketball League seasons
- ← 1984–85 1986–87 →

The 1985–86 Yugoslav First Basketball League season was the 42nd season of the Yugoslav First Basketball League, the highest professional basketball league in SFR Yugoslavia.

== Notable events ==
=== Dražen Petrović's 112-point game ===
The first week of fixtures on 5 October 1985 included a game in Zagreb at Dom Sportova's small hall between Cibona and visiting Smelt Olimpija—a contest that would go down in history for Dražen Petrović's Yugoslav Basketball League single-game scoring record as well as the strange circumstance that allowed it to happen.

Due to Olimpija general manager Radovan Lorbek reportedly being late with submitting a registration letter to the Yugoslav Basketball Federation (KSJ) headquarters in Belgrade, the visiting team failed to fulfill their player-registration administrative obligations in time, rendering their entire first team roster ineligible for the regular season opening game. Olimpija were thus forced to field players from their youth system. Sending out juniors (age 18 and under) would've normally been the first option; however, since Olimpija had no junior team within their youth system that year, they had to go to an even younger age group—making do with cadets (16 and under). In the end, the team they took to Zagreb consisted of players born in 1968 and younger, including Igor Đurović, Matjaž Strmole, Jože Maček, Dag Kralj, Tine Erjavec, Jure Zorčič, Gregor Stražiščar, Andrej Novina, and Tine Merzelj.

Cibona for their part decided to send out a mixed roster consisting of players from their youth system plus their twenty-one-year-old superstar Dražen Petrović who used the opportunity of playing against inferior opposition to shatter Radivoj Korać's single-game Yugoslav League scoring record from 1962 when Korać scored 74 points for OKK Beograd versus Mladost Zagreb. In a 158–77 blowout in front of 2,000 people against the hapless Ljubljana team, Petrović scored 112 points on 40 for 60 field goal shooting that included 10 for 20 three-point shooting. He did so despite reportedly announcing, before the game, his intention of leaving the floor once he reached Korać's 74 points. Petrović was one of only five Cibona players to get on the score sheet that day, the other four were eighteen-year-old Dražen Anzulović with 16 points, eighteen-year-old Vladimir Rizman with 14, nineteen-year-old Ivo Nakić with 12, and Ivan Šoštarec with 4.

=== Cibona's 20-game winning streak ===
Cibona dominated the regular season with only a single loss in the entire campaign, thus equaling the feat that had previously been managed only twice in Yugoslav League history — Zadar in 1974–75 and Crvena Zvezda in 1949. Behind young Dražen Petrović's scoring exploits (his regular-season scoring average was 43.3 points per game), the Zagreb club opened the league campaign with twenty straight wins before finally losing, 102–100, away to Šibenka (Petrović's old team) in the second last game of the regular season — a contest in which Petrović recorded 52 points, but Šibenka still eked out a win led by Predrag Šarić who scored 36 points.

=== Budućnost's surprise success ===
Budućnost's was the season's biggest surprise package. Playing only its 6th season in the country's top-flight basketball league, the unfancied side from Titograd that had never had a positive season record (more wins than losses) in its previous five seasons was now nearly unbeatable at home, losing only one game in front of its home fans — against powerful Cibona. Led by veterans Duško Ivanović (28.5 ppg season average), Dragan Ivanović, Nikola Antić, Milatović, and Jadran Vujačić, the team also received a great contribution from its rising star Žarko Paspalj who turned 20 years of age over the course of the season.

== Teams ==
(Socialist Republic of Croatia) SR Croatia

- Cibona
- Jugoplastika
- Šibenka
- Zadar

(Socialist Republic of Serbia) SR Serbia

- Borac Čačak
- Crvena Zvezda
- Partizan
- Sloga

(Socialist Republic of Bosnia and Herzegovina) SR Bosnia and Herzegovina

- Bosna

(Socialist Republic of Macedonia) SR Macedonia

- Rabotnički

(Socialist Republic of Montenegro) SR Montenegro

- Budućnost

(Socialist Republic of Slovenia) SR Slovenia

- Smelt Olimpija

== Regular season ==
=== Classification ===
Pos	Teams	Pld	W	L	PF	PA	Pts	Playoffs or relegation
1.	Cibona	22	21	1	2474	2074	43	Advance to Playoffs quarterfinal
2.	Zadar	22	15	7	2050	1921	37	Advance to Playoffs quarterfinal
3.	Budućnost	22	13	9	1990	2002	35	Advance to Playoffs quarterfinal
4.	Šibenka	22	12	10	2069	2066	34	Advance to Playoffs quarterfinal
5.	Partizan	22	12	10	2165	2119	34	Advance to Play-in round
6.	Jugoplastika	22	12	10	2013	1979	34	Advance to Play-in round
7.	Bosna	22	10	12	1979	2046	32	Advance to Play-in round
8.	Crvena Zvezda	22	10	12	2098	2114	32	Advance to Play-in round
9.	Borac Čačak	22	8	14	1901	1964	30	Advance to Play-in round
10.	Rabotnički	22	7	15	1884	2058	29	Advance to Play-in round
11.	Smelt Olimpija (-1)	22	8	14	2058	2142	29	Relegated
12.	Sloga	22	4	18	2028	2193	26	Relegated

NOTE: KK Smelt Olimpija was sanctioned by the board of Yugoslav Basketball Association (KSJ) because club's fans were causing incidents on the game against KK Zadar in Tivoli Hall on October 14. The match was cancelled by the referee. Final decisions were deduction of one point from Olimpija, the game was registered as a 2-0 win for Zadar and Olimpija had to play three home matches in another town.

With the same amount of points, KK Rabotnički had better head-to-head score against KK Olimpija, thus Olimpija was relegated.

== Results ==
Home \ Away	CIB	ZAD	BUD	ŠIB	PAR	JUG	BOS	CZV	BOR	RAB	OLI	SLO
Cibona	—	147–85	120–105	133–96	121–114	132–113	113–97	108–90	113–96	126–90	158–77	123–102
Zadar	87–94	—	87–67	91–83	94–88	81–76	109–106	105–90	105–89	88–84	94–90	130–108
Budućnost	91–100	92–90	—	88–86	93–83	94–84	90–78	104–92	101–85	85–80	116–104	90–80
Šibenka	102–100	91–96	93–89	—	91–86	93–76	91–96	105–92	92–91	107–95	93–86	101–98
Partizan	78–88	64–98	109–94	106–104	—	100–92	120–90	84–107	82–81	124–85	124–127	118–105
Jugoplastika	82–93	94–84	108–101	86–87	107–106	—	103–77	109–85	97–79	110–76	90–80	87–80
Bosna	101–103	109–106	80–76	99–93	88–97	96–88	—	92–82	85–86	92–80	114–110	105–99
Crvena Zvezda	104–118	103–93	106–89	97–95	99–104	88–86	101–93	—	92–95	77–76	105–92	95–92
Borac Čačak	76–90	83–84	77–81	93–87	86–88	69–78	84–74	98–90	—	94–76	87–83	95–90
Rabotnički	89–115	87–80	87–88	74–97	83–91	93–96	77–74	90–88	92–77	—	88–84	98–79
Olimpija	103–111	0–2	90–71	107–91	91–88	73–80	108–89	107–101	80–78	92–98	—	112–83
Sloga	96–97	91–105	83–85	87–91	95–111	88–96	68–82	104–92	104–102	97–86	100–99	—

Source: Pearlbasket
Legend: Blue = home team win; Red = away team win.
Matches with lighter background shading were decided after overtime.

Other source:

== Playoffs ==
Only the top four placed league table teams qualified for the playoffs quarterfinal automatically.

Teams placed fifth, sixth, seventh, eighth, ninth, and tenth were joined by the top two Second League teams for an 8-team play-in round. The winner of each best-of-three series advanced to the playoffs quarterfinal round.

E- IB League east division champion

W- IB League west division champion

Play-in qualifying round
8	Crvena zvezda	99	91
9	Borac Čačak	92	89
5	Partizan	94	95	102
W	Sloboda DITA	85	96	98
7	Bosna	100	102
10	Rabotnički	89	85
6	Jugoplastika	89	96
E	MZT Skopje	79	87

Quarter-finals
1	Cibona	124	102	120
8	Crvena zvezda	107	105	107
4	Šibenka	101	92
5	Partizan	102	99
2	Zadar	103	81
7	Bosna	88	79
3	Budućnost	92	103
6	Jugoplastika	97	106

Semi-finals
1	Cibona	104	123	128
5	Partizan	94	124	104
2	Zadar	98	76
6	Jugoplastika	77	74

Final
1	Cibona	84	73	110
2	Zadar	70	84	111

PLAY-IN QUALIFYING ROUND

Partizan-Sloboda DITA Tuzla 94-85, 95-96, 102-98

Jugoplastika Split-MZT Skopje 89-79, 96-87

KK Bosna-Rabotnički 100-89, 102-85

Crvena Zvezda-Borac Čačak 99-92, 91-89

QUARTERFINALS

Cibona Zagreb-Crvena Zvezda 124-107, 102-105, 120-107

Šibenka-Partizan 101-102, 92-99

Zadar-KK Bosna 103-88, 81-79

Budućnost-Jugoplastika Split 92-97, 103-106

SEMIFINALS

Cibona Zagreb-Partizan 104-94, 123-124, 128-104

Zadar-Jugoplastika Split 98-77, 76-74

FINALS

Cibona Zagreb-Zadar 84-70, 73-84, 110-111 (2OT)

=== Finals ===
==== Game 1: Cibona vs Zadar 84-70 ====
Cibona dominated the opening game of the final series on its home court with strong outside shooting — behind Dražen Petrović's 28 points, Danko Cvjetićanin's 22, and Sven Ušić's 16.

Still, the visitors from Zadar could find some comfort in their defensive play due to managing to limit Cibona to 84 points — well below 116.8 points per game Cibona had been scoring in their prior six games of the 1986 Yugoslav League playoffs.

==== Game 2: Zadar vs Cibona 84-73 ====
Zadar won game two on its home court at Jazine, having led comfortably throughout the entire contest (halftime score was 42-30). Receiving balanced scoring from its roster — Petar Popović and Veljko Petranović with 15 points each, Ante Matulović with 14, Draženko Blažević 12, Darko Pahlić 11, and Ivica Obad 10 — Zadar's win was never in question.

Cibona's best player Dražen Petrović didn't appear in game two somewhat controversially with the official reason provided by the club that he got injured during warm-up right before the game. There has been rife speculation after the game as well as in the years and decades since in the Yugoslav press and public that—having been so convinced of their superiority over Zadar as well as their dominance on their Dom Sportova home court in Zagreb where at that point they hadn't lost a competitive game for more than three years since March 1983—Cibona essentially tanked game two because they wanted to celebrate the Yugoslav league title in front of their fans at home in game three.

==== Game 3: Cibona vs Zadar 110-111 2OT ====
With the best-of-three series tied at one apiece, the deciding game 3 was played on Cibona's home court, Dom Sportova, on Saturday, 26 April 1986.

Supported by over 10,000 fans, despite plenty of nervy play from the home team (Dražen Petrović getting a technical for accosting the referee and Franjo Arapović getting ejected for striking Darko Pahlić), Cibona had the early lead behind Cvjetićanin's scoring (got 22 of Cibona's 42 first half points) while Dražen Petrović, who returned to the squad after controversially sitting out game two, also scored actively. Still, Zadar kept chasing with most of its first half points coming from their twenty-six-year-old captain Veljko Petranović and twenty-two-year-old center Stojko Vranković. The team's leading scorer, shooting guard Petar Popović, on the other hand, was completely out of the shooting rhythm — missing his first three shots, getting benched seven minutes into the game by head coach Vlade Đurović, and ending up scoreless at halftime. Cibona was up 42-37 at halftime.

Popović finally managed to get on the scoresheet five minutes into the second half, at which point he started scoring in bunches. Still, Cibona led continuously and midway through the second half, with ten minutes to go, they were up by eleven points—71-60—their highest lead of the game. Zadar made one last push and managed to catch up with three-point shooting to tie up the score 85-85 at the end of regulation. The visiting team even had the last possession, but failed to score.

Midway through the overtime, Cibona's leader Dražen Petrović fouled out with his fifth personal foul; leaving the contest with 39 points. At the end of overtime, the score was tied again, 96-96. In the second overtime, with Dražen Petrović no longer on the court, the game turned into a shooting duel between Cvjetićanin and Popović before eventually being decided by Popović's two three-pointers as Zadar pulled out a famous 110-111 victory on the road. Zadar's scoring was led by Popović who scored 35 points (all of them in the second half and two overtimes), while on Cibona's side, beside Dražen Petrović's 39 points (7 three-pointers), Cvjetićanin added 37 points (5 three-pointers).

It was Cibona's first home loss in a competitive game in over three years in all competitions — with their previous home loss occurring on 16 March 1983 in the Yugoslav League versus Red Star Belgrade. And it was a costly loss for Cibona because it meant that despite winning the FIBA European Champions Cup that season, the club didn't get to compete in the next season's edition of the competition.

The winning roster of Zadar:

- (Socialist Federal Republic of Yugoslavia) Darko Pahlić
- (Socialist Federal Republic of Yugoslavia) Petar Popović
- (Socialist Federal Republic of Yugoslavia) Milan Mlađan
- (Socialist Federal Republic of Yugoslavia) Ante Matulović
- (Socialist Federal Republic of Yugoslavia) Drago Čiklić
- (Socialist Federal Republic of Yugoslavia) Ivan Sunara
- (Socialist Federal Republic of Yugoslavia) Zdenko Babić
- (Socialist Federal Republic of Yugoslavia) Draženko Blažević
- (Socialist Federal Republic of Yugoslavia) Stojko Vranković
- (Socialist Federal Republic of Yugoslavia) Veljko Petranović
- (Socialist Federal Republic of Yugoslavia) Ivica Obad
- (Socialist Federal Republic of Yugoslavia) Boris Hrabrov
- (Socialist Federal Republic of Yugoslavia) Samir Žuža

Coach: (Socialist Federal Republic of Yugoslavia) Vlade Đurović

== Scoring leaders ==
1. Dražen Petrović (Cibona) – 906 points (43.1 ppg) — the highest ever per game scoring average over the course of a single season in the history of the Yugoslav First Basketball League.
2. ???
3. Duško Ivanović (Budućnost) – ___ points (28.5ppg)

== Qualification in 1986-87 season European competitions ==
FIBA European Champions Cup

- Zadar (league champions)

FIBA Cup Winners' Cup

- Cibona (Cup winners)

FIBA Korać Cup

- Budućnost (3rd)
- Šibenka (4th)
- Partizan (5th)
- Jugoplastika (6th)

== Basketball Cup ==
=== Preliminary round ===
Key to colors
Top placed team in each group advanced to semifinals

==== Ljubljana tournament ====
	Team	Pld	W	L	Pts
1	Smelt Olimpija	3	3	0	6
2	Jugoplastika	3	2	1	4
3	Zadar	3	1	2	2
4	Priština	3	0	3	0

==== Šibenik tournament ====
	Team	Pld	W	L	Pts
1	Šibenka	3	3	0	6
2	Partizan	3	2	1	4
3	Željezničar Sarajevo	3	1	2	2
4	TIMA MTT Maribor	3	0	3	0

==== Čapljina tournament ====
	Team	Pld	W	L	Pts
1	Bosna	3	3	0	6
2	Sloga	3	2	1	4
3	Radnički Belgrade	3	1	2	2
4	Vojvodina	3	0	3	0

==== Skopje tournament ====
	Team	Pld	W	L	Pts
1	Cibona	3	3	0	6
2	MZT Skopje	3	2	1	4
3	Zorka Šabac	3	1	2	2
4	Budućnost	2	0	2	0

=== Bracket ===
Semifinals
Cibona	121
Smelt Olimpija	110
Bosna	92
Šibenka	90

Finals
Cibona	110
Bosna	98
