= KK Zadar in international competitions =

KK Zadar history and statistics in FIBA Europe and Euroleague competitions.

== European competitions ==
Record	Round	Opponent club		
1965–66 FIBA European Champions Cup 1st–tier
2–6	2nd round	(Romania) Dinamo București	78–92 (a)	70–56 (h)
2–6	QF	(Greece) AEK	69–71 (h)	71–76 (a)
2–6	QF	(Bulgaria) CSKA Cherveno zname	79–53 (h)	58–84 (a)
2–6	QF	(Soviet Union) CSKA Moscow	49–79 (a)	84–87 (h)
1967–68 FIBA European Champions Cup 1st–tier
5–7	1st round	(Hungary) Honvéd	72–86 (a)	64–43 (h)
5–7	2nd round	(Greece) Panathinaikos	70–79 (a)	89–62 (h)
5–7	QF	(Spain) Juventud Kalso	85–69 (h)	44–46 (a)
5–7	QF	(Bulgaria) CSKA Cherveno zname	75–89 (a)	79–64 (h)
5–7	QF	(Italy) Simmenthal Milano	60–75 (a)	90–66 (h)
5–7	SF	(Spain) Real Madrid	62–76 (a)	65–68 (h)
1968–69 FIBA European Champions Cup 1st–tier
5–3	2nd round	(France) ASVEL	54–74 (a)	88–67 (h)
5–3	QF	(Spain) Real Madrid	70–60 (h)	68–80 (a)
5–3	QF	(Soviet Union) CSKA Moscow	75–83 (a)	74–73 (h)
5–3	QF	(Bulgaria) Academic	89–85 (a)	89–84 (h)
1970–71 FIBA European Cup Winners' Cup 2nd–tier
3–2 +1 draw	1st round	(Albania) 17 Nëntori Tirana	73–60 (h)	72–62 (a)
3–2 +1 draw	2nd round	(Czechoslovakia) Dukla Olomouc	85–85 (a)	66–61 (h)
3–2 +1 draw	QF	(Soviet Union) Spartak Leningrad	59–63 (a)	78–98 (h)
1974–75 FIBA European Champions Cup 1st–tier
6–6	2nd round	Bye	Zadar qualified without games	
6–6	QF	(Czechoslovakia) Slavia VŠ Praha	93–69 (h)	85–86 (a)
6–6	QF	(Belgium) Maes Pils	94–91 (a)	90–78 (h)
6–6	QF	(Italy) Ignis Varese	85–91 (a)	91–94 (h)
6–6	QF	(Bulgaria) Balkan Botevgrad	106–61 (h)	85–95 (a)
6–6	QF	(Austria) Sefra Wien	86–80 (a)	94–74 (h)
6–6	SF	(Spain) Real Madrid	82–109 (a)	117–130 (h)
1975–76 FIBA European Champions Cup 1st–tier
4–6	2nd round	Bye	Zadar qualified without games	
4–6	QF	(France) ASVEL	73–70 (h)	65–70 (a)
4–6	QF	(Finland) Turun NMKY	73–84 (a)	95–77 (h)
4–6	QF	(Bulgaria) Academic	78–97 (a)	89–90 (h)
4–6	QF	(Belgium) Maes Pils	93–90 (h)	84–103 (a)
4–6	QF	(Italy) Mobilgirgi Varese	74–101 (a)	93–91 (h)
1979–80 FIBA European Cup Winners' Cup 2nd–tier
5–5	1st round	(Hungary) Soproni MAFC	109–104 (a)	97–74 (h)
5–5	2nd round	(Israel) Hapoel Ramat Gan	75–80 (a)	96–90 (h)
5–5	QF	(Italy) Emerson Varese	92–120 (a)	67–84 (h)
5–5	QF	(Spain) FC Barcelona	86–120 (a)	96–90 (h)
5–5	QF	(Turkey) Eczacıbaşı	92–82 (h)	85–94 (a)
1980–81 FIBA Korać Cup 3rd–tier
4–4	2nd round	(Turkey) Beşiktaş	96–81 (a)	88–64 (h)
4–4	Top 16	(Soviet Union) Dynamo Moscow	111–114 (h)	98–102 (a)
4–4	Top 16	(Belgium) Standard Liège	91–101 (a)	120–99 (h)
4–4	Top 16	(France) Orthez	104–103 (h)	91–92 (a)
1981–82 FIBA Korać Cup 3rd–tier
7–3	2nd round	(Greece) PAOK	94–88 (a)	103–93 (h)
7–3	Top 16	(Spain) Joventut Sony	81–74 (h)	88–84 (a)
7–3	Top 16	(Italy) Cagiva Varese	75–83 (a)	119–104 (h)
7–3	Top 16	(France) Orthez	112–91 (h)	105–108 (a)
7–3	SF	(France) Limoges CSP	92–84 (h)	78–99 (a)
1982–83 FIBA Korać Cup 3rd–tier
9–3	1st round	(Cyprus) Keravnos	115–61 (a)	112–61 (h)
9–3	2nd round	(Switzerland) Pully	112–98 (a)	119–97 (h)
9–3	Top 16	(France) Tours	81–104 (a)	102–80 (h)
9–3	Top 16	(Belgium) Maes Pils	92–84 (a)	89–79 (h)
9–3	Top 16	(Spain) CAI Zaragoza	101–85 (h)	85–94 (a)
9–3	SF	(Socialist Federal Republic of Yugoslavia) Šibenka	78–70 (h)	69–89 (a)
1983–84 FIBA Korać Cup 3rd–tier
6–2	2nd round	(Belgium) Standard Liège	104–81 (h)	95–78 (a)
6–2	Top 16	(Greece) PAOK	89–80 (h)	72–67 (a)
6–2	Top 16	(France) Orthez	77–90 (a)	106–93 (h)
6–2	Top 16	(Italy) Star Varese	97–83 (h)	100–111 (a)
1984–85 FIBA Korać Cup 3rd–tier
1–1	2nd round	(Greece) Aris	71–84 (a)	94–89 (h)
1985–86 FIBA Korać Cup 3rd–tier
6–4	1st round	(Cyprus) APOEL	121–40 (a)	192–116 (h)
6–4	2nd round	(Greece) Panionios	97–78 (a)	92–73 (h)
6–4	Top 16	(France) Olympique Antibes	101–78 (h)	67–87 (a)
6–4	Top 16	(Greece) PAOK	70–73 (a)	98–79 (h)
6–4	Top 16	(Italy) Berloni Torino	105–114 (h)	68–85 (a)
1986–87 FIBA European Champions Cup 1st–tier
8–6	1st round	(Luxembourg) Sparta Bertrange	116–68 (a)	113–71 (h)
8–6	2nd round	(Bulgaria) Levski-Spartak	90–88 (a)	102–89 (h)
8–6	SF	(Israel) Maccabi Elite Tel Aviv	83–99 (a)	78–81 (h)
8–6	SF	(Soviet Union) Žalgiris	82–78 (h)	88–70 (a)
8–6	SF	(Spain) Real Madrid	79–92 (a)	107–83 (h)
8–6	SF	(France) Orthez	70–64 (h)	69–73 (a)
8–6	SF	(Italy) Tracer Milano	78–85 (h)	85–106 (a)
1988–89 FIBA Korać Cup 3rd–tier
6–4	2nd round	(Turkey) Efes Pilsen	123–84 (a)	85–96 (h)
6–4	Top 16	(Spain) Ram Joventut	102–84 (h)	69–90 (a)
6–4	Top 16	(Israel) Hapoel Tel Aviv	93–84 (a)	87–72 (h)
6–4	Top 16	(Greece) Olympiacos	116–97 (h)	77–66 (a)
6–4	SF	(Socialist Federal Republic of Yugoslavia) Partizan	63–75 (a)	84–88 (h)
1989–90 FIBA Korać Cup 3rd–tier
5–5	1st round	(Bulgaria) Spartak Pleven	119–72 (a)	132–68 (h)
5–5	2nd round	(Belgium) Maccabi Brussels	103–96 (a)	116–105 (h)
5–5	Top 16	(Italy) Scavolini Pesaro	89–94 (h)	93–112 (a)
5–5	Top 16	(Spain) Ram Joventut	99–100 (h)	72–79 (a)
5–5	Top 16	(France) Pau-Orthez	85–87 (a)	119–102 (h)
1990–91 FIBA Korać Cup 3rd–tier
5–4 +1 draw	2nd round	(Soviet Union) Kalev	75–85 (a)	92–71 (h)
5–4 +1 draw	Top 16	(Greece) Panionios	81–91 (a)	127–99 (h)
5–4 +1 draw	Top 16	(Spain) Estudiantes Caja Postal	105–95 (h)	65–84 (a)
5–4 +1 draw	Top 16	(Belgium) Sunair Oostende	99–97 (a)	112–72 (h)
5–4 +1 draw	QF	(France) Mulhouse	84–84 (h)	67–80 (a)
1991–92 FIBA Korać Cup 3rd–tier
9–3	1st round	(Hungary) Körmendi Dózsa	97–85 (a)	83–73 (h)
9–3	2nd round	(Turkey) TED Ankara Kolejliler	86–76 (a)	98–95 (h)
9–3	Top 16	(Italy) Benetton Treviso	90–96 (h)	90–81 (a)
9–3	Top 16	(Greece) Nikas Peristeri	89–83 (a)	118–92 (h)
9–3	Top 16	(Spain) Taugrés	100–97 (h)	72–79 (a)
9–3	QF	(Spain) Fórum Filatélico Valladolid	80–95 (h)	91–83 (a)
1992–93 FIBA European League 1st–tier
6–10	2nd round	(Russia) CSKA Moscow	86–95 (a)	88–78 (h)
6–10	Top 16	(Italy) Benetton Treviso	73–77 (h)	71–92 (a)
6–10	Top 16	(Belgium) Maes Pils	75–93 (a)	77–67 (h)
6–10	Top 16	(Spain) Estudiantes Caja Postal	106–89 (h)	72–106 (a)
6–10	Top 16	(Germany) Bayer 04 Leverkusen	72–79 (a)	71–77 (h)
6–10	Top 16	(Greece) Olympiacos	86–77 (h)	61–75 (a)
6–10	Top 16	(France) Pau-Orthez	75–85 (a)	89–86 (h)
6–10	Top 16	(Spain) Real Madrid	92–90 (h)	76–105 (a)
1993–94 FIBA European Cup 2nd–tier
5–9	2nd round	(Ukraine) Bipa-Moda Odesa	87–83 (a)	87–89 (h)
5–9	3rd round	(Poland) Nobiles Włocławek	86–60 (h)	75–78 (a)
5–9	Top 12	(Greece) Sato Aris	95–98 (a)	90–83 (h)
5–9	Top 12	(Israel) Hapoel Galil Elyon	85–91 (a)	85–93 (h)
5–9	Top 12	(Portugal) Ovarense	82–94 (h)	81–87 (a)
5–9	Top 12	(Bulgaria) Levski Sofia	119–75 (h)	97–92 (a)
5–9	Top 12	(France) Pitch Cholet	81–93 (a)	82–88 (h)
1996–97 FIBA EuroCup 2nd–tier
6–6	1st round	(Belgium) AST Gent	71–64 (h)	69–80 (a)
6–6	1st round	(Poland) Śląsk Wrocław	64–80 (a)	99–90 (h)
6–6	1st round	(Cyprus) Achilleas	93–80 (a)	89–66 (h)
6–6	1st round	(Netherlands) Libertel EBBC	69–87 (h)	97–88 (a)
6–6	1st round	(Greece) Iraklis Thessaloniki	73–88 (a)	93–87 (h)
6–6	2nd round	(Greece) Dexim Apollon Patras	56–75 (h)	64–82 (a)
1997–98 FIBA Korać Cup 3rd–tier
1–5	1st round	Bye	Zadar qualified without games	
1–5	2nd round	(Italy) Riello Mash Verona	64–76 (a)	75–81 (h)
1–5	2nd round	(North Macedonia) Orka Sport	69–75 (a)	89–70 (h)
1–5	2nd round	(Turkey) Kombassan Konya	62–65 (h)	49–65 (a)
1998–99 FIBA EuroLeague 1st–tier
4–12	1st round	(Turkey) Ülker	55–62 (a)	73–85 (h)
4–12	1st round	(Italy) Kinder Bologna	55–65 (h)	53–62 (a)
4–12	1st round	(Russia) CSKA Moscow	82–79 (h)	68–66 (a)
4–12	1st round	(Greece) Olympiacos	55–71 (a)	55–67 (h)
4–12	1st round	(Germany) Alba Berlin	85–78 (a)	79–82 (h)
4–12	2nd round	(France) ASVEL	74–56 (h)	61–69 (a)
4–12	2nd round	(Slovenia) Union Olimpija	65–76 (a)	61–72 (h)
4–12	2nd round	(Spain) Real Madrid	68–73 (h)	75–86 (a)
1999–00 FIBA Saporta Cup 2nd–tier
14–4	1st round	(Slovenia) Kovinotehna Savinjska Polzela	73–68 (h)	93–77 (a)
14–4	1st round	(Russia) Arsenal Tula	70–49 (a)	113–72 (h)
14–4	1st round	(Spain) Pamesa Valencia	66–71 (a)	59–74 (h)
14–4	1st round	(Estonia) Tartu ÜSK Delta	69–65 (h)	86–61 (a)
14–4	1st round	(Cyprus) Achilleas	85–68 (a)	103–70 (h)
14–4	2nd round	(Bulgaria) Cherno More Port Varna	73–63 (a)	99–70 (h)
14–4	Top 16	(France) PSG Racing	76–57 (h)	67–72 (a)
14–4	QF	(Poland) Zepter Śląsk Idea Wrocław	63–56 (a)	69–64 (h)
14–4	SF	(Greece) AEK	75–70 (h)	67–82 (a)
2000–01 Euroleague 1st–tier
2–8	Regular season	(Switzerland) Lugano Snakes	74–75 (a)	118–79 (h)
2–8	Regular season	(Italy) Paf Wennington Bologna	87–91 (h)	77–81 (a)
2–8	Regular season	(Spain) Adecco Estudiantes	81–93 (a)	80–72 (h)
2–8	Regular season	(Greece) Peristeri	79–92 (h)	73–92 (a)
2–8	Regular season	(Lithuania) Žalgiris	85–97 (a)	86–87 (h)
2001–02 Euroleague 1st–tier
2–12	Regular season	(Slovenia) Krka	94–91 (a)	97–98 (h)
2–12	Regular season	(France) Pau-Orthez	79–83 (h)	73–101 (a)
2–12	Regular season	(Spain) Real Madrid	73–81 (h)	84–114 (a)
2–12	Regular season	(Italy) Skipper Bologna	85–95 (a)	76–82 (h)
2–12	Regular season	(Russia) CSKA Moscow	73–90 (h)	92–96 (a)
2–12	Regular season	(Greece) Panathinaikos	64–102 (a)	81–85 (h)
2–12	Regular season	(Federal Republic of Yugoslavia) Budućnost	88–79 (h)	97–110 (a)
2002–03 ULEB Cup 2nd–tier
7–7	Regular season	(Netherlands) Ricoh Astronauts	99–94 (a)	90–80 (h)
7–7	Regular season	(Italy) Metis Varese	73–71 (h)	86–88 (a)
7–7	Regular season	(France) Cholet	91–90 (h)	65–76 (a)
7–7	Regular season	(Spain) Caprabo Lleida	77–85 (a)	81–79 (h)
7–7	Regular season	(Belgium) Spirou	66–86 (h)	66–80 (a)
7–7	Top 16	(France) Gravelines	94–71 (h)	64–78 (a)
7–7	QF	(Spain) Pamesa Valencia	84–105 (a)	93–80 (h)
2003–04 ULEB Cup 2nd–tier
5–5	Regular season	(Spain) Auna Gran Canaria	72–66 (h)	64–71 (a)
5–5	Regular season	(Spain) Caprabo Lleida	66–71 (a)	76–85 (h)
5–5	Regular season	(Austria) Superfund Bulls	86–82 (h)	88–76 (a)
5–5	Regular season	(Serbia and Montenegro) Atlas	91–72 (a)	82–75 (h)
5–5	Regular season	(Germany) RheinEnergie Köln	73–75 (h)	75–78 (a)
2004–05 ULEB Cup 2nd–tier
5–5	Regular season	(Spain) Gran Canaria	64–82 (a)	89–71 (h)
5–5	Regular season	(Greece) Maroussi Honda	94–71 (h)	72–78 (a)
5–5	Regular season	(France) Cholet	76–70 (h)	79–83 (a)
5–5	Regular season	(Netherlands) MPC Capitals	71–73 (a)	74–51 (h)
5–5	Regular season	(Belgium) Telindus Oostende	81–64 (h)	83–87 (a)
2005–06 FIBA EuroCup 3rd–tier
5–7	Regular season	(Spain) Gran Canaria	71–73 (h)	78–75 (a)
5–7	Regular season	(Belgium) Leuven	74–81 (a)	83–58 (h)
5–7	Regular season	(Germany) RheinEnergie Köln	49–74 (a)	75–67 (h)
5–7	Top 16	(Russia) Lokomotiv Rostov	61–76 (a)	81–89 (h)
5–7	Top 16	(Belgium) Dexia Mons-Hainaut	78–62 (h)	90–92 (a)
5–7	Top 16	(Poland) Śląsk Wrocław	92–58 (h)	85–87 (a)
2007–08 ULEB Cup 2nd–tier
(8–6)	Regular season	(Russia) UNICS	87–90 (a)	76–64 (h)
(8–6)	Regular season	(Poland) Turów Zgorzelec	85–74 (h)	72–77 (a)
(8–6)	Regular season	(Netherlands) EiffelTowers EBBC	83–93 (a)	84–65 (h)
(8–6)	Regular season	(Israel) Hapoel Migdal Jerusalem	83–84 (a)	103–75 (h)
(8–6)	Regular season	(France) SIG	94–65 (h)	83–74 (a)
(8–6)	Top 32	(Ukraine) Azovmash	80–82 (a)	77–60 (h)
(8–6)	Top 16	(Spain) Pamesa Valencia	74–69 (h)	70–93 (a)
2008–09 Eurocup 2nd–tier
7–6	Regular season	(Greece) Maroussi Costa Coffee	87–79 (h)	75–91 (a)
7–6	Regular season	(Latvia) ASK Riga	94–106 (a)	83–68 (h)
7–6	Regular season	(France) Chorale Roanne	84–66 (a)	82–70 (h)
7–6	Top 16	(Turkey) Türk Telekom	82–89 (a)	94–86 (h)
7–6	Top 16	(Italy) Benetton Treviso	76–84 (h)	81–94 (a)
7–6	Top 16	(Russia) UNICS	93–91 (h)	71–69 (a)
7–6	QF	(Spain) Iurbentia Bilbao	73–79; April 3, Pala Alpitour, Turin	
2009–10 Eurocup 2nd–tier
3–3	Regular season	(Greece) Aris	68–73 (h)	67–73 (a)
3–3	Regular season	(Lithuania) Šiauliai	95–91 (a)	110–87 (h)
3–3	Regular season	(Israel) Hapoel Migdal Jerusalem	74–93 (a)	86–69 (h)
2010–11 FIBA EuroChallenge 3rd–tier
4–8	Regular season	(Turkey) Pınar Karşıyaka	81–88 (a)	82–77 (h)
4–8	Regular season	(Cyprus) APOEL	95–73 (h)	56–61 (a)
4–8	Regular season	(Cyprus) Intercollege ETHA Engomis	66–78 (a)	81–67 (h)
4–8	Top 16	(Russia) Lokomotiv Kuban	69–87 (a)	71–81 (h)
4–8	Top 16	(Czech Republic) Prostějov	96–90 (h)	82–99 (a)
4–8	Top 16	(Belgium) Telenet Oostende	73–85 (h)	53–76 (a)

== Record ==
KK Zadar has overall from 1965–66 (first participation) to 2010–11 (last participation): 180 wins against 187 defeats plus 2 draws in 369 games for all the European club competitions.

- EuroLeague: 44–76 (120)
  - FIBA Saporta Cup: 33–26 plus 1 draw (60) /// EuroCup Basketball: 35–32 (67)
    - FIBA Korać Cup: 59–38 plus 1 draw (98) /// FIBA EuroChallenge: 9–15 (24)

== See also ==
- Yugoslav basketball clubs in European competitions
