= 1967–68 Yugoslav First Basketball League =

- League: Yugoslav First Basketball League
- Sport: Basketball
- Duration: 11 November 1967 – April 1968

1967–68
- Season champions: (Socialist Republic of Croatia) Zadar

Yugoslav First Basketball League seasons
- ← 1967 1968–69 →

The 1967–68 Yugoslav First Basketball League season was the 24th season of the Yugoslav First Basketball League. The season ended with KK Zadar winning the league championship, ahead of KK Olimpija.

The season represents a milestone in the history of basketball in Yugoslavia as the beginning of a new era that saw the sport being played entirely indoors on hardwood floor surfaces as opposed to outdoors on a variety of surfaces as had been the practice previously. The change enabled the league to switch to a seasonal schedule that begins during autumn and ends in spring as opposed to the previous practice of playing within the same calendar year, usually between April and October.

== Notable events ==
=== Yugoslav league basketball moves indoors ===
Since most Yugoslav basketball clubs didn't yet possess basketball-specific indoor facilities of their own, they had to make do with hosting their home games in community-owned makeshift venues or in case of three clubs—playing outside of their home city.

The four Belgrade clubs—Red Star, Partizan, OKK, and Radnički—played their home games at the various Belgrade Fair halls (including the biggest one: Hall 1), Zagreb's Lokomotiva played at the Zagreb Police's Fire Hall, while certain clubs had to play in altogether different cities: defending champions KK Zadar played most of their home games of the season in Split, Čačak's Borac played their home games in Zrenjanin, and Sarajevo's newly-promoted Mlada Bosna played in Zenica.

=== Opening day ===
The season began on Saturday, 11 November 1967–only six days after the previous season ended on 5 November 1967–with the opening game in Ljubljana's Topniška Street Hall pitting the home team KD Slovan versus the visiting Red Star Belgrade. Despite being the underdogs, the home team won 79–78.

== Teams ==
(Socialist Republic of Serbia) SR Serbia
- Borac Čačak
- Crvena Zvezda
- OKK Beograd
- Partizan
- Radnički Belgrade
(Socialist Republic of Croatia) SR Croatia
- Jugoplastika
- Lokomotiva
- Zadar
- Željezničar Karlovac

(Socialist Republic of Bosnia and Herzegovina) SR Bosnia and Herzegovina

- Mlada Bosna
(Socialist Republic of Slovenia) SR Slovenia
- Olimpija
- Slovan

== Classification ==
| | Regular season ranking 1967–68 | G | V | P | PF | PS | Pt |
|---|---|---|---|---|---|---|---|
| 1. | KK Zadar | 22 | 19 | 3 | 1861 | 1555 | 38 |
| 2. | AŠK Olimpija | 22 | 18 | 4 | 1975 | 1734 | 36 |
| 3. | Crvena Zvezda | 22 | 14 | 8 | 1904 | 1634 | 28 |
| 4. | Partizan | 22 | 14 | 8 | 1885 | 1779 | 28 |
| 5. | KK Lokomotiva | 22 | 12 | 10 | 1878 | 1815 | 24 |
| 6. | Jugoplastika | 22 | 12 | 10 | 1759 | 1724 | 24 |
| 7. | OKK Beograd | 22 | 10 | 12 | 1776 | 1807 | 20 |
| 8. | Željezničar Karlovac | 22 | 9 | 13 | 1666 | 1736 | 18 |
| 9. | Radnički Belgrade | 22 | 9 | 13 | 1829 | 1870 | 18 |
| 10. | KD Slovan | 22 | 8 | 14 | 1641 | 1840 | 16 |
| 11. | Borac Čačak | 22 | 7 | 15 | 1719 | 1874 | 14 |
| 12. | Mlada Bosna | 22 | 0 | 22 | 1524 | 2049 | 0 |

== Results ==
| Home \ Away | ZAD | OLI | CZV | PAR | LOK | JUG | OKK | ŽKA | RAD | SLV | BOR | MLB |
|---|---|---|---|---|---|---|---|---|---|---|---|---|
| Zadar | — | 79–71 | 73–56 | 83–72 | 85–79 | 83–76 | 86–52 | 101–74 | 96–93 | 101–62 | 91–67 | 93–58 |
| Olimpija | 66–75 | — | 92–87 | 109–79 | 92–88 | 93–87 | 83–68 | 97–84 | 111–87 | 77–70 | 105–87 | 115–58 |
| Crvena Zvezda | 97–87 | 82–88 | — | 86–76 | 95–81 | 90–62 | 90–82 | 97–65 | 77–78 | 116–58 | 97–68 | 120–52 |
| Partizan | 86–74 | 85–78 | 62–64 | — | 93–79 | 90–84 | 75–67 | 77–69 | 81–77 | 105–70 | 114–91 | 127–71 |
| Lokomotiva | 64–70 | 96–92 | 87–94 | 101–88 | — | 99–87 | 71–94 | 85–80 | 99–77 | 96–80 | 91–79 | 122–79 |
| Jugoplastika | 75–69 | 81–89 | 88–83 | 85–74 | 67–65 | — | 84–86 | 64–55 | 80–79 | 88–68 | 90–80 | 101–67 |
| OKK Beograd | 63–88 | 78–91 | 72–70 | 85–86 | 72–81 | 74–65 | — | 81–80 | 94–103 | 107–80 | 103–76 | 79–72 |
| Željezničar Karlovac | 79–98 | 70–77 | 58–56 | 78–72 | 71–82 | 69–66 | 89–99 | — | 76–71 | 62–48 | 97–83 | 78–75 |
| Radnički Belgrade | 59–72 | 85–96 | 78–87 | 87–90 | 78–74 | 82–91 | 81–72 | 87–98 | — | 96–83 | 91–65 | 85–77 |
| Slovan | 68–85 | 62–75 | 79–78 | 80–84 | 87–88 | 78–71 | 79–66 | 86–82 | 93–84 | — | 78–75 | 80–55 |
| Borac Čačak | 71–80 | 77–81 | 80–84 | 82–74 | 81–67 | 78–90 | 96–83 | 69–68 | 78–82 | 81–72 | — | 75–66 |
| Mlada Bosna | 67–92 | 69–97 | 68–98 | 79–95 | 74–83 | 73–77 | 81–99 | 65–84 | 80–89 | 68–80 | 70–80 | — |

Source: KOS magazin
Legend: Blue = home team win; Red = away team win.
Matches with lighter background shading were decided after overtime.

The winning roster of Zadar:

- (Socialist Federal Republic of Yugoslavia) Miljenko Valčić
- (Socialist Federal Republic of Yugoslavia) Đuro Stipčević
- (Socialist Federal Republic of Yugoslavia) Milan Komazec
- (Socialist Federal Republic of Yugoslavia) Bruno Marcelić
- (Socialist Federal Republic of Yugoslavia) Mile Marcelić
- (Socialist Federal Republic of Yugoslavia) Josip Đerđa
- (Socialist Federal Republic of Yugoslavia) Krešimir Ćosić
- (Socialist Federal Republic of Yugoslavia) Ratko Laura
- (Socialist Federal Republic of Yugoslavia) Petar Anić
- (Socialist Federal Republic of Yugoslavia) Jure Košta
- (Socialist Federal Republic of Yugoslavia) Goran Brajković
- (Socialist Federal Republic of Yugoslavia) Petar Jelić
- (Socialist Federal Republic of Yugoslavia) Željko Troskot
- (Socialist Federal Republic of Yugoslavia) Nikola Olujić

Coach: (Socialist Federal Republic of Yugoslavia) Đorđo Zdrilić

== Qualification in 1968–69 season European competitions ==
FIBA European Champions Cup

- Zadar (champions)

FIBA Cup Winner's Cup

- Olimpija (2nd)
