= 1973–74 Yugoslav First Basketball League =

- League: Yugoslav First Basketball League
- Sport: Basketball

1973-74
- Season champions: (Socialist Republic of Croatia) Zadar

Yugoslav First Basketball League seasons
- ← 1972–73 1974–75 →

The 1973–74 Yugoslav First Basketball League season was the 30th season of the Yugoslav First Basketball League, the highest professional basketball league in SFR Yugoslavia.

== Teams ==
(Socialist Republic of Serbia) SR Serbia

- Borac Čačak
- Crvena Zvezda
- Metalac Valjevo
- OKK Beograd
- Partizan
- Radnički Belgrade

(Socialist Republic of Croatia) SR Croatia

- Industromontaža
- Jugoplastika
- Lokomotiva
- Zadar

(Socialist Republic of Bosnia and Herzegovina) SR Bosnia and Herzegovina

- Bosna
- Željezničar Sarajevo

(Socialist Republic of Macedonia) SR Macedonia

- Rabotnički

(Socialist Republic of Slovenia) SR Slovenia

- Olimpija

== Classification ==
	Regular season ranking 1973-74	G	V	P	PF	PS	Pt
1.	Zadar	26	22	4	2317	1976	44
2.	Jugoplastika	26	19	7	2351	2107	38
3.	Crvena Zvezda	26	17	9	2378	2216	34
4.	Bosna	26	14	12	2192	2144	28
5.	Radnički Belgrade	26	14	12	2365	2316	28
6.	Partizan	26	14	12	2178	2080	28
7.	Olimpija	26	13	13	2349	2294	26
8.	Borac Čačak	26	12	14	2332	2366	24
9.	OKK Beograd	26	12	14	2092	2210	24
10.	Lokomotiva	26	11	15	2271	2377	22
11.	Rabotnički	26	9	17	2252	2365	18
12.	Metalac Valjevo	26	8	18	1988	2192	16
13.	Industromontaža	26	8	18	1896	2087	16
14.	Željezničar Sarajevo	26	7	19	1896	2087	14

The winning roster of Zadar:

- (Socialist Federal Republic of Yugoslavia) Čedomir Perinčić
- (Socialist Federal Republic of Yugoslavia) Jure Fabijanić
- (Socialist Federal Republic of Yugoslavia) Bruno Marcelić
- (Socialist Federal Republic of Yugoslavia) Bruno Petani
- (Socialist Federal Republic of Yugoslavia) Josip Đerđa
- (Socialist Federal Republic of Yugoslavia) Krešimir Ćosić
- (Socialist Federal Republic of Yugoslavia) Zdravko Jerak
- (Socialist Federal Republic of Yugoslavia) Nedjeljko "Mišo" Ostarčević
- (Socialist Federal Republic of Yugoslavia) Tomislav Matulović
- (Socialist Federal Republic of Yugoslavia) Branko Skroče
- (Socialist Federal Republic of Yugoslavia) Branko Bakija
- (Socialist Federal Republic of Yugoslavia) Žarko Bjedov

Coach: (Socialist Federal Republic of Yugoslavia) Lucijan Valčić

== Results ==
Home \ Away	ZAD	JUG	CZV	BOS	RAD	PAR	OLI	BOR	OKK	LOK	RAB	MET	IND	ŽSA
Zadar	—	84–77	95–90	98–81	94–86	91–75	94–67	100–81	100–76	100–81	85–69	109–75	107–77	96–61
Jugoplastika	80–76	—	90–92	87–93	104–76	87–82	95–84	94–84	106–73	102–92	103–87	106–60	109–70	99–63
Crvena Zvezda	77–75	74–81	—	102–83	101–95	79–87	128–123	81–76	84–71	120–91	87–77	113–75	80–68	99–70
Bosna	72–76	85–79	93–87	—	96–85	85–83	91–90	96–91	95–72	78–76	102–80	94–77	113–77	64–62
Radnički Belgrade	71–90	87–103	93–94	83–72	—	102–103	84–86	105–95	96–86	117–109	104–90	95–77	95–67	88–76
Partizan	83–79	76–73	88–78	78–60	78–80	—	98–99	95–71	94–60	97–81	94–80	62–63	59–67	81–62
Olimpija	74–85	110–90	80–78	65–68	89–90	96–83	—	83–78	96–91	110–85	111–100	102–91	93–96	85–61
Borac Čačak	72–77	85–87	83–82	111–112	93–108	114–111	105–102	—	114–105	97–81	98–86	100–88	90–88	84–74
OKK Beograd	75–74	89–90	86–103	71–60	92–91	85–72	87–76	82–77	—	103–104	98–85	86–65	80–76	61–68
Lokomotiva	79–89	95–97	90–92	96–82	105–103	78–73	98–96	83–91	73–83	—	74–72	80–79	86–78	89–82
Rabotnički	82–90	91–96	109–119	92–84	82–87	86–79	86–84	99–97	85–70	104–97	—	97–87	114–91	87–82
Metalac Valjevo	71–81	55–68	75–68	88–84	88–87	57–72	82–77	73–75	61–62	81–80	74–61	—	79–75	70–74
Industromontaža	70–90	75–74	84–103	70–82	76–85	73–76	78–86	83–81	79–59	83–89	88–72	74–63	—	73–79
Željezničar Sarajevo	74–82	0–20	76–67	68–67	69–72	94–97	79–90	91–95	86–89	68–79	90–79	65–62	53–58	—

Source: Pearlbasket
Legend: Blue = home team win; Red = away team win.
Matches with lighter background shading were decided after overtime.

== Scoring leaders ==
1. Radmilo Mišović (Borac Čačak) - ___ points (33.0ppg)
2. Nikola Plećaš (Lokomotiva) - ___ points (30.4ppg)

== Qualification in 1974-75 season European competitions ==
FIBA European Champions Cup

- Zadar (champions)

FIBA Cup Winner's Cup

- Jugoplastika (Cup winners)
- Crvena Zvezda (title holder)

FIBA Korać Cup

- Bosna (4th)
- Partizan (6th)

== Basketball Cup ==
=== Bracket ===
Eightfinals
Jugoplastika	90
Zadar	78
Beti Metlika	61
Industromontaža	97
Rabotnički	81
Željezničar Sarajevo	69
Vojvodina	88
Lokomotiva	89
Olimpija	77
OKK Beograd	89
Crvena zvezda	90
Bosna	85
Radnički FOB Belgrade	109
Budućnost	85
Univerzitet Priština	77
Partizan	117

Quarterfinals
Jugoplastika	80
Industromontaža	65
Lokomotiva	91
Rabotnički	111
OKK Beograd	85
Crvena zvezda	96
Radnički FOB Belgrade	80
Partizan	85

Semifinals
Jugoplastika
Rabotnički
Crvena zvezda	81
Partizan	80

Finals
Jugoplastika	92
Crvena zvezda	85
