= 1965 Yugoslav First Basketball League =

- League: Yugoslav First Basketball League
- Sport: Basketball

1965
- Season champions: (Socialist Republic of Croatia) Zadar
- Top scorer: Radivoj Korać

Yugoslav First Basketball League seasons
- ← 1964 1966 →

The 1965 Yugoslav First Basketball League season was the 21st season of the Yugoslav First Basketball League.

== Teams ==
(Socialist Republic of Croatia) SR Croatia
- Lokomotiva
- Split
- Zadar
- Željezničar Karlovac
(Socialist Republic of Serbia) SR Serbia
- Crvena Zvezda
- OKK Beograd
- Partizan
- Radnički Belgrade
(Socialist Republic of Slovenia) SR Slovenia
- Lesonit Ilirska Bistrica
- Olimpija
- Slovan

(Socialist Republic of Macedonia) SR Macedonia

- Rabotnički

== Classification ==
	Regular season ranking 1965	G	V	P	PF	PS	Pt
1.	Zadar	22	18	4	1928	1669	36
2.	Olimpija	22	16	6	1959	1655	32
3.	OKK Beograd	22	15	7	1833	1483	30
4.	Lokomotiva	22	13	9	1726	1574	26
5.	Partizan	22	12	10	1851	1725	24
6.	Split	22	12	10	1519	1493	24
7.	Željezničar Karlovac	22	12	10	1637	1608	24
8.	Crvena Zvezda	22	11	11	1682	1666	22
9.	Radnički Belgrade	22	7	15	1786	1760	14
10.	Slovan	22	7	15	1705	1857	14
11.	Rabotnički	22	5	17	1528	1799	10
12.	Lesonit Ilirska Bistrica	22	1	21	1240	2105	2

=== The winning roster ===
The winning roster of Zadar:

- (Socialist Federal Republic of Yugoslavia) Miljenko Valčić
- (Socialist Federal Republic of Yugoslavia) Đuro Stipčević
- (Socialist Federal Republic of Yugoslavia) Milan Komazec
- (Socialist Federal Republic of Yugoslavia) Bruno Marcelić
- (Socialist Federal Republic of Yugoslavia) Mile Marcelić
- (Socialist Federal Republic of Yugoslavia) Josip Đerđa
- (Socialist Federal Republic of Yugoslavia) Krešimir Ćosić
- (Socialist Federal Republic of Yugoslavia) Marko Ostarčević
- (Socialist Federal Republic of Yugoslavia) Vladimir Ćubrić
- (Socialist Federal Republic of Yugoslavia) Zanki
- (Socialist Federal Republic of Yugoslavia) Petar Anić
- (Socialist Federal Republic of Yugoslavia) Jure Košta
- (Socialist Federal Republic of Yugoslavia) Goran Brajković
- (Socialist Federal Republic of Yugoslavia) Petar Jelić
- (Socialist Federal Republic of Yugoslavia) Željko Troskot

Coach: (Socialist Federal Republic of Yugoslavia) Enzo Sovitti

== Results ==
Home \ Away	ZAD	OLI	OKK	LOK	PAR	SPL	ŽKA	CZV	RAD	SLV	RAB	LES
Zadar	—				106–96			101–88				
Olimpija		—			114–83							
OKK Beograd			—		85–70		79–68					
Lokomotiva				—	72–75					94–81		
Partizan	88–89	90–72	95–109	65–71	—	74–61	77–44	64–81	83–76	87–69	80–56	107–49
Split					96–87	—			72–67			
Željezničar Karlovac					78–64		—					
Crvena Zvezda					74–77			—				
Radnički Belgrade					90–115				—			
Slovan					89–80					—		
Rabotnički					76–93						—	
Lesonit Ilirska Bistrica					68–101							—

Source: Partizanopedia.rs
Legend: Blue = home team win; Red = away team win.
Matches with lighter background shading were decided after overtime.

== Scoring leaders ==
1. Radivoj Korać (OKK Beograd) – 695 points (34.8 ppg)

== Qualification in 1965-66 season European competitions ==
FIBA European Champions Cup

- Zadar (champions)
