= Petar Popović (basketball, born 1959) =

Croatian basketball player and coach

Personal information
- Born: 13 July 1959 (age 67) Kraljevo, PR Serbia, FPR Yugoslavia

Career information
- Playing career: 1976–1997
- Position: Shooting guard
- Number: 6
- Coaching career: 2001–2011

Career history

Playing
- 1976–1993: Zadar
- 1993–1996: Benston Zagreb
- 1996–1997: Zadar

Coaching
- 2001, 2006–2007: Zadar
- 2009–2011: Zadar (youth)

Career highlights
- As player: Yugoslav League champion (1986); As head coach: Krešimir Ćosić Cup winner (2007)
Medals
Men's basketball
Representing Yugoslavia
EuroBasket
Silver medal – second place	1981 Czechoslovakia	Team
European Championship for Juniors
Bronze medal – third place	1978 Italy	Team

Petar Popović (Serbian Cyrillic: Петар Поповић; born 13 July 1959) is a Croatian professional basketball coach and former player.

== Playing career ==
Popović played for Zadar in the Yugoslav First League (later Croatian League) for 18 seasons. In 1993 he moved to Zagreb where he signed with Benston of the Croatian League.

== National team career ==
Popović was a member of the Yugoslavia national team, alongside Krešimir Ćosić, Dragan Kićanović, Dražen Dalipagić and Mirza Delibašić, that won the silver medal at the EuroBasket 1981 held in Czechoslovakia. Over six tournament games, he averaged 2.3 points per game. Also, he won the bronze medal at the 1978 European Championship for Juniors in Italy where he averaged 10 points per game.

== Coaching career ==
Popović was selected as the head coach for Zadar twice; the first time briefly in 2001, and later from the end of the 2005–06 season till March 2007.

== Personal life ==
His son, Marko, was also a professional basketball player. His nephews are both former professional basketballers, Alan Gregov, who won the silver medal with the Croatia national team at the 1992 Summer Olympics in Barcelona, a bronze medal at the 1994 FIBA World Championship and a bronze medal at EuroBasket 1993, and Arijan Komazec.
