= Darko Pahlić =

Croatian basketball player

Darko Pahlić (born January 17, 1963, in Zadar, PR Croatia, FPR Yugoslavia) is a former Croatian basketball player. Pahlić was part of the KK Zadar team that won the 1986 Yugoslav national championship, sensationally beating the reigning European champion Cibona in the playoffs.
