= 1966 Yugoslav First Basketball League =

- League: Yugoslav First Basketball League
- Sport: Basketball

1966
- Season champions: (Socialist Republic of Slovenia) Olimpija

Yugoslav First Basketball League seasons
- ← 1965 1967 →

The 1966 Yugoslav First Basketball League season was the 22nd season of the Yugoslav First Basketball League.

== Teams ==
(Socialist Republic of Serbia) SR Serbia
- Borac Čačak
- Crvena Zvezda
- OKK Beograd
- Partizan
- Radnički Belgrade
(Socialist Republic of Croatia) SR Croatia
- Lokomotiva
- Split
- Zadar
- Željezničar Karlovac
(Socialist Republic of Slovenia) SR Slovenia
- Olimpija
- Slovan

(Socialist Republic of Montenegro) SR Montenegro

- Ivangrad

== Classification ==
	Regular season ranking 1966	G	V	P	PF	PS	Pt
1.	Olimpija	22	17	5	1985	1655	34
2.	Partizan	22	16	6	1814	1690	32
3.	Zadar	22	14	8	1860	1679	28
4.	Crvena Zvezda	22	14	8	1922	1803	28
5.	Split	22	13	9	1556	1506	26
6.	Željezničar Karlovac	22	13	9	1592	1552	26
7.	Lokomotiva	22	11	11	1644	1599	22
8.	OKK Beograd	22	10	12	1572	1579	20
9.	Radnički Belgrade	22	10	12	1711	1755	20
10.	Borac Čačak	22	8	14	1571	1714	16
11.	Slovan	22	5	17	1624	1788	10
12.	Ivangrad	22	1	21	1510	2041	2

The winning roster of Olimpija:

- (Socialist Federal Republic of Yugoslavia) Ivo Daneu
- (Socialist Federal Republic of Yugoslavia) Emil Logar
- (Socialist Federal Republic of Yugoslavia) Borut Bassin
- (Socialist Federal Republic of Yugoslavia) Vital Eiselt
- (Socialist Federal Republic of Yugoslavia) Matija Dermastija
- (Socialist Federal Republic of Yugoslavia) Miha Lokar
- (Socialist Federal Republic of Yugoslavia) Darko Hočevar
- (Socialist Federal Republic of Yugoslavia) Jure Božič
- (Socialist Federal Republic of Yugoslavia) Andrej Osterc
- (Socialist Federal Republic of Yugoslavia) Dušan Verbič
- (Socialist Federal Republic of Yugoslavia) Igor Jelnikar
- (Socialist Federal Republic of Yugoslavia) Bogdan Müller
- (Socialist Federal Republic of Yugoslavia) Andrej Brenk

Coach: (Socialist Federal Republic of Yugoslavia) Boris Kristančič

== Results ==
Home \ Away	OLI	PAR	ZAD	CZV	SPL	ŽKA	LOK	OKK	RAD	BOR	SLV	IVA
Olimpija	—	105–86	104–82	107–90	72–62	85–66	83–72	78–74	98–67	92–74	107–73	133–51
Partizan	81–77	—	101–88	69–75	67–65	75–71	85–68	85–72	74–73	78–74	80–59	98–66
Zadar	86–60	75–76	—	88–84	84–65	72–60	95–68	81–55	96–78	102–84	86–66	134–93
Crvena Zvezda	92–88	76–86	93–90	—	85–86 (Note: Played on neutral terrain in Kraljevo, because Crvena Zvezda home ground was suspended for two games.)	78–68 (Note: The match was played behind closed doors because of recent crowd trouble during the game against Partizan.)	83–72	78–88	84–78	96–71	112–86	131–66
Split	75–92	88–76	81–70	76–67	—	74–63	61–54	53–50	59–70	79–53	69–65	93–59
Željezničar Karlovac	73–71	71–93	69–57	100–83	56–53	—	52–66	58–53	77–69	93–75	70–63	83–59
Lokomotiva	79–92	86–91	82–74 (Note: The match was officially recorded with the score that stood when it was stopped, with 90 seconds remaining in the first extra time period.)	80–83	80–66	64–68	—	76–69	98–66	101–73	66–61	86–64
OKK Beograd	73–69 (Note: The first match between OKK Beograd and Olimpija was 84-82 for OKK Beograd but later annulled.)	68–77	78–89	60–61	53–51	60–79	75–62	—	80–72	76–63	106–81	89–71
Radnički Belgrade	78–83	93–83	56–67	101–96	80–85	73–71	63–71	74–80	—	98–93	86–64	94–68
Borac Čačak	72–82	82–80	64–62	77–82	61–58	72–69	67–53	67–69	76–82	—	73–56	80–66
Slovan	81–109	81–75	84–88	83–87	77–79	75–83	76–85	71–67	82–84	82–52	—	94–63
Ivangrad	68–98	77–98	78–94	83–106	72–78	82–92	52–75	83–77	70–76	58–68	61–64	—

Source: Partizanopedia.rs
Legend: Blue = home team win; Red = away team win.
Matches with lighter background shading were decided after overtime.

== Qualification in 1966–67 season European competitions ==
FIBA European Champions Cup

- Olimpija (champions)

FIBA Cup Winners' Cup

- Partizan (2nd)
