= 1967 Yugoslav First Basketball League =

- League: Yugoslav First Basketball League
- Sport: Basketball

1967
- Season champions: (Socialist Republic of Croatia) Zadar

Yugoslav First Basketball League seasons
- ← 1966 1967–68 →

The 1967 Yugoslav First Basketball League season was the 23rd season of the Yugoslav First Basketball League.

== Teams ==
(Socialist Republic of Serbia) SR Serbia
- Borac Čačak
- Crvena Zvezda
- OKK Beograd
- Partizan
- Radnički Belgrade
(Socialist Republic of Croatia) SR Croatia
- BSK Slavonski Brod
- Lokomotiva
- Split
- Zadar
- Željezničar Karlovac
(Socialist Republic of Macedonia) SR Macedonia
- Rabotnički
(Socialist Republic of Slovenia) SR Slovenia
- Olimpija

== Classification ==
	Regular season ranking 1967	Pt	G	V	P	PF	PS
1.	Zadar	38	22	19	3	1982	1563
2.	Olimpija	34	22	17	5	1870	1710
3.	Crvena Zvezda	30	22	15	7	1853	1661
4.	OKK Beograd	26	22	13	9	1748	1618
5.	Željezničar Karlovac	24	22	12	10	1582	1559
6.	Split	22	22	11	11	1667	1663
7.	Partizan	22	22	11	11	1759	1696
8.	Lokomotiva	20	22	10	12	1749	1713
9.	Radnički Belgrade	18	22	9	13	1761	1794
10.	Borac Čačak	16	22	8	14	1525	1775
11.	Rabotnički	14	22	7	15	1448	1729
12.	BSK (SB)	0	22	0	22	1638	2100

The winning roster of Zadar:

- (Socialist Federal Republic of Yugoslavia) Miljenko Valčić
- (Socialist Federal Republic of Yugoslavia) Đuro Stipčević
- (Socialist Federal Republic of Yugoslavia) Milan Komazec
- (Socialist Federal Republic of Yugoslavia) Bruno Marcelić
- (Socialist Federal Republic of Yugoslavia) Mile Marcelić
- (Socialist Federal Republic of Yugoslavia) Josip Đerđa
- (Socialist Federal Republic of Yugoslavia) Krešimir Ćosić
- (Socialist Federal Republic of Yugoslavia) Ratko Laura
- (Socialist Federal Republic of Yugoslavia) Petar Anić
- (Socialist Federal Republic of Yugoslavia) Jure Košta
- (Socialist Federal Republic of Yugoslavia) Goran Brajković
- (Socialist Federal Republic of Yugoslavia) Petar Jelić
- (Socialist Federal Republic of Yugoslavia) Željko Troskot
- (Socialist Federal Republic of Yugoslavia) Nikola Olujić
- (Socialist Federal Republic of Yugoslavia) Igor Troskot
- (Socialist Federal Republic of Yugoslavia) Željko Ortika

Coach: (Socialist Federal Republic of Yugoslavia) Đorđo Zdrilić

== Results ==
Home \ Away	ZAD	OLI	CZV	OKK	ŽKA	SPL	PAR	LOK	RAD	BOR	RAB	BSK
Zadar	—	68–49	88–70	93–80	95–69	78–61	110–79	96–82	105–75	110–71	99–52	159–104
Olimpija	95–85	—	94–89	83–65	77–75	84–60	106–105	82–69	99–70	120–73	89–61	81–65
Crvena Zvezda	63–90	96–70	—	86–77	74–59	70–45	80–75	85–72	98–85	84–52	95–47	93–69
OKK Beograd	72–63	87–73	76–84	—	80–71	77–73	74–67	84–70	74–76	108–85	102–50	111–68
Željezničar Karlovac	47–73	81–74	75–63	71–80	—	70–55	56–75	80–77	89–70	86–61	96–67	84–69
Split	62–57	79–81	94–86	84–74	83–74	—	77–83	87–60	95–88	83–65	78–71	99–89
Partizan	72–75	83–85	65–83	61–70	70–67	84–71	—	74–65	70–65	78–89	93–66	94–66
Lokomotiva	79–95	95–96	106–96	76–68	59–52	79–83	84–69	—	85–74	95–81	66–62	124–73
Radnički Belgrade	65–87	82–85	84–74	85–62	94–87	95–82	75–95	75–79	—	73–57	86–66	115–63
Borac Čačak	69–70	50–47	68–86	69–92	74–70	70–69	56–90	54–79	83–72	—	75–55	81–74
Rabotnički	67–92	81–86	82–90	67–55	52–67	70–68	86–84	79–59	61–63	64–58	—	80–63
BSK (SB)	80–94	91–105	88–108	77–104	68–72	59–79	90–93	62–92	94–96	70–74	56–62	—

Source: Partizanopedia.rs
Legend: Blue = home team win; Red = away team win.
Matches with lighter background shading were decided after overtime.

== Qualification in 1967-68 season European competitions ==
FIBA European Champions Cup

- Zadar (champions)

FIBA Cup Winner's Cup

- Olimpija (2nd)
