= Alan Gregov =

Croatian basketball player (born 1970)

Personal information
- Born: 1 April 1970 (age 56) Zadar, SR Croatia, SFR Yugoslavia
Medal record
Men's Basketball
Representing Croatia
Olympic Games
| Silver medal – second place | 1992 Barcelona | Team competition |
World Championships
| Bronze medal – third place | 1994 Canada | Croatia |
European Championships
| Bronze medal – third place | 1993 Germany | Croatia |
| Bronze medal – third place | 1995 Greece | Croatia |

Alan Gregov (born April 1, 1970) is a Croatian retired basketball player.

Alan Gregov has won the silver medal with the Croatia national basketball team at the 1992 Summer Olympics in Barcelona, Spain, a bronze medal at 1994 FIBA World Championship and a bronze medal at EuroBasket 1993.

His uncle is Petar Popović, former Croatian basketball player.
