= 1974–75 Yugoslav First Basketball League =

- League: Yugoslav First Basketball League
- Sport: Basketball

1974-75
- Season champions: (Socialist Republic of Croatia) Zadar

Yugoslav First Basketball League seasons
- ← 1973–74 1975–76 →

The 1974–75 Yugoslav First Basketball League season was the 31st season of the Yugoslav First Basketball League, the highest professional basketball league in SFR Yugoslavia.

== Teams ==
(Socialist Republic of Serbia) SR Serbia

- Beko Beograd
- Borac Čačak
- Crvena Zvezda
- Metalac Valjevo
- Partizan
- Radnički FOB Belgrade
- Vojvodina

(Socialist Republic of Croatia) SR Croatia

- Istravino
- Jugoplastika
- Lokomotiva
- Zadar

(Socialist Republic of Bosnia and Herzegovina) SR Bosnia and Herzegovina

- Bosna

(Socialist Republic of Macedonia) SR Macedonia

- Rabotnički

(Socialist Republic of Slovenia) SR Slovenia

- Olimpija

== Classification ==
	Regular season ranking 1974-75	G	V	P	PF	PS	Pt
1.	Zadar	26	25	1	2309	2028	50
2.	Jugoplastika	26	22	4	2564	2210	44
3.	Partizan	26	19	7	2527	2381	38
4.	Crvena Zvezda	26	18	8	2473	2321	36
5.	Rabotnički	26	13	13	2285	2342	26
6.	Olimpija	26	12	14	2549	2503	24
7.	Bosna	26	12	14	2362	2295	24
8.	Lokomotiva	26	11	15	2374	2406	22
9.	Borac Čačak	26	11	15	2474	2582	22
10.	Radnički FOB Belgrade	26	11	15	2366	2357	22
11.	Beko Beograd	26	8	18	2325	2497	16
12.	Metalac Valjevo	26	8	18	2213	2389	16
13.	Vojvodina	26	7	19	2351	2608	14
14.	Istravino	26	5	21	2142	2395	10

The winning roster of Zadar:

- (Socialist Federal Republic of Yugoslavia) Čedomir Perinčić
- (Socialist Federal Republic of Yugoslavia) Jure Fabijanić
- (Socialist Federal Republic of Yugoslavia) Branko Bakija
- (Socialist Federal Republic of Yugoslavia) Žarko Bjedov
- (Socialist Federal Republic of Yugoslavia) Bruno Marcelić
- (Socialist Federal Republic of Yugoslavia) Bruno Petani
- (Socialist Federal Republic of Yugoslavia) Branko Šuljak
- (Socialist Federal Republic of Yugoslavia) Josip Đerđa
- (Socialist Federal Republic of Yugoslavia) Krešimir Ćosić
- (Socialist Federal Republic of Yugoslavia) Zdravko Jerak
- (Socialist Federal Republic of Yugoslavia) Nedjeljko "Mišo" Ostarčević
- (Socialist Federal Republic of Yugoslavia) Tomislav Matulović
- (Socialist Federal Republic of Yugoslavia) Branko Skroče
- (Socialist Federal Republic of Yugoslavia) Josip Grdović

Coach: (Socialist Federal Republic of Yugoslavia) Lucijan Valčić

== Results ==
Home \ Away	ZAD	JUG	PAR	CZV	RAB	OLI	BOS	LOK	BOR	RAD	BEK	MET	VOJ	IST
Zadar	—	89–81	102–98	80–73	114–84	115–96	80–76	77–75	70–65	95–87	101–77	75–60	113–86	89–76
Jugoplastika	76–68	—	114–85	86–88	106–90	103–98	84–83	97–70	121–103	93–76	109–89	105–58	115–63	103–93
Partizan	84–102	89–94	—	93–81	107–91	109–95	112–93	100–95	101–96	106–102	83–72	103–79	126–100	93–69
Crvena Zvezda	78–82	102–94	81–86	—	97–96	108–98	87–83	117–102	105–88	109–108	117–97	90–75	107–91	111–81
Rabotnički	80–92	81–84	81–80	77–83	—	103–98	90–73	92–110	114–88	81–80	91–85	89–78	84–76	85–75
Olimpija	75–81	100–93	99–104	89–87	99–91	—	108–104	103–106	102–104	85–87	91–86	92–76	123–97	113–75
Bosna	67–71	87–94	94–75	88–90	81–85	84–86	—	110–106	83–86	96–93	109–69	97–85	108–94	85–83
Lokomotiva	80–82	85–97	82–87	106–97	78–86	91–90	85–101	—	94–86	104–116	78–90	90–83	119–80	87–83
Borac Čačak	72–91	79–98	99–104	92–109	120–99	113–116	98–95	97–101	—	107–105	99–98	107–97	110–97	80–77
Radnički FOB Belgrade	71–76	81–82	92–108	99–87	83–78	85–87	81–84	78–87	81–85	—	92–82	105–87	111–103	77–72
Beko Beograd	84–90	83–110	96–95	82–79	85–95	102–101	89–110	108–100	97–102	96–105	—	100–81	96–85	96–68
Metalac Valjevo	80–96	92–104	69–77	81–91	98–81	107–103	70–76	82–80	103–92	73–79	116–98	—	76–78	103–89
Vojvodina	77–95	95–111	107–122	83–97	94–78	90–100	92–95	92–85	109–94	90–84	100–88	105–108	—	90–78
Istravino	70–84	83–110	96–100	84–102	79–83	78–86	98–96	74–78	115–112	88–83	90–80	83–92	85–77	—

Source: Pearlbasket
Legend: Blue = home team win; Red = away team win.
Matches with lighter background shading were decided after overtime.

Other source:

== Scoring leaders ==
1. Nikola Plećaš (Lokomotiva) - ___ points (33.1ppg)

== Qualification in 1975-76 season European competitions ==
FIBA European Champions Cup

- Zadar (champions)

FIBA Cup Winner's Cup

- Rabotnički (5th)

FIBA Korać Cup

- Jugoplastika (2nd)
- Partizan (3rd)

== Basketball Cup ==
=== Bracket ===
Eightfinals
Jugoplastika
Olimpija
Zadar
Crvena zvezda	102
Partizan	100

Quarterfinals
Jugoplastika
Olimpija
Zadar
Crvena zvezda

Semifinals
Jugoplastika	87
Olimpija	72
Zadar	87
Crvena zvezda	89

Finals
Jugoplastika	79
Crvena zvezda	81
