= KK Željezničar Sarajevo =

- Nickname: Željo; Plavi (The Blues)
- Founded: 19 September 1921; 104 years ago
- Location: Sarajevo, Bosnia and Herzegovina
- Team colors: Blue and White
Home	Away

KK Željezničar Sarajevo (Košarkaški klub Željezničar Sarajevo in English: Željezničar Sarajevo Basketball Club), also known as Željezničar Sarajevo, is the basketball section of the multi-sport society SD Željezničar, based in Sarajevo, Bosnia and Herzegovina.

== History ==
Basketball is the second most popular sport in Bosnia-Herzegovina. The men's KK Željezničar team was one of the Yugoslavian clubs from the Bosnian region in the 1960s and 1970s, but when the Yugoslav Wars led to the breakup of the Yugoslav federation in 1992, the men's team ceased to exist. In the overall Yugoslav championship table 1946–1991, the men's KK Željezničar Sarajevo occupies 24th place. They spent six seasons in the top flight. In 2024, the men's team was established again.

The women's team, ŽKK Željezničar Sarajevo, won the Yugoslav championship (in which they were regular participants) in 1971, and lost Yugoslav Basketball Cup final in both 1988 and 1989. Since Bosnia-Herzegovina became independent, with its own basketball league and cup competitions, ŽKK Željezničar has won the Bosnian championship title 9 times, Bosnian Cup 8 times and the WABA League in 2003.

== Accomplishments ==
Note that all results after 1992 are for ŽKK Željezničar Sarajevo, the women's basketball team from the Željezničar Sarajevo sports club.

- Champions of Yugoslav Women's Basketball League (1) - 1971
- Basketball Championship of Bosnia and Herzegovina (Women) (11) - 1998, 1999, 2002, 2003, 2004, 2005, 2006, 2007, 2008, 2009, 2010
- Basketball Cup of Bosnia and Herzegovina (Women) (9) - 1998, 1999, 2003, 2004, 2005, 2006, 2007, 2008, 2010
- WABA League (1) - 2003
- National League Winners (12):- 1971, 1998, 1999, 2002, 2003, 2004, 2005, 2006, 2007, 2008, 2009, 2010. There were three separated league and cup competitions in Bosnia and Herzegovina before the 2002/2003 season and, before that season, only several joint play-offs were played to determine one final champion or cup winner. KK Željezničar also won four championship and four cup titles in one of those regions.
- Regional champions (4) - 1998, 1999, 2000, 2001.
- Regional Cup winners (4) - 1998, 1999, 2000, 2001.
