= Branko Skroče =

Croatian basketball player

Personal information
- Born: May 17, 1955 (age 71) Zadar, PR Croatia, FPR Yugoslavia
Medals
Men's basketball
Representing Yugoslavia
Gold medal – first place	1980 Moscow	Team competition
European Championship for Juniors
Gold medal – first place	1974 France	Team

Branko Skroče (born 17 May 1955 in Zadar) is a retired Croatian basketball player who competed for Yugoslavia in the 1980 Summer Olympics.

== See also ==
- Yugoslav First Federal Basketball League career stats leaders
