= Josip Gjergja =

Croatian basketball player and coach

Personal information
- Born: November 24, 1937 (age 88) Zara, Kingdom of Italy
- Listed height: 5 ft 9 in (1.75 m)
- Listed weight: 165 lb (75 kg)

Career information
- Playing career: 1958–1976
- Position: Point guard
- Coaching career: 1983–1994, 2003

Career history

Playing
- 1958–1976: Zadar

Coaching
- 1983: Yugoslavia
- 1984–1985: PAOK
- 1993–1994: Zadar
- 1994: Croatia
- 2003: Prishtina

Career highlights
- As a player: FIBA European Selection (1968); 5× Yugoslav League champion: (1965, 1967, 1968, 1974, 1975); Yugoslav Cup winner (1970); Croatian Lifetime Achievement Award in Sport (2014); Croatian Sportsman of the Year (1963)
Medals
Men's basketball
Representing Yugoslavia
FIBA World Cup
Silver medal – second place	1963 Brazil
Silver medal – second place	1967 Uruguay
EuroBasket
Silver medal – second place	1965 USSR
Head coach for Croatia
FIBA World Cup
Bronze medal – third place	1994 Canada

Josip "Pino" Gjergja (also transliterated Đerđa, Djerdja or Giergia; born 24 November 1937), also credited as Giuseppe Giergia, (Note: Giuseppe Giergia was his birth name, changed by the Yugoslav regime. Recently he obtained legally to change his name back to the original version) is a retired Croatian basketball player and coach. He represented the Yugoslavia national basketball team internationally. He was nominated for the EuroLeague's 50 Greatest Contributors list in 2008. He was born in Zadar, to an Arbanasi family, hence the variously transcribed name. At a height of 1.76 m (5 ft 9 in) tall, he played at the point guard position.

== Playing career ==
Gjergja wore KK Zadar's jersey for 18 consecutive seasons, thus becoming one of the club's legends, alongside Krešimir Ćosić. He was a three time Yugoslav Basketball League champion, from 1965 to 1968, and won another two Yugoslav championships, back-to back, in 1974 and 1975. He also won the Yugoslav Cup in 1970.

== National team career ==
Gjergja was a member of the Yugoslav national team. With Yugoslavia, he won two FIBA World Cup silver medals, in 1963 and 1967, as well as a EuroBasket silver medal in 1965. He also participated in two Summer Olympic Games, in 1960 and 1964.

== Coaching career ==
Gjergja began a coaching career after his retirement from playing. As a head coach, he led the senior Croatian national team to the FIBA World Cup bronze medal, at the 1994 FIBA World Championship. In 2003, he coached the club team, Prishtina, in Kosovo.

== Personal life ==
Gjergja's son, Dario, is a professional basketball coach as well.

== See also ==
- Yugoslav First Federal Basketball League career stats leaders

== Notes and references ==
Notes
