= Bruno Pavelić =

Serbian basketball player (1937–2021)

Personal information
- Born: 4 March 1937 Belgrade, Yugoslavia
- Died: 28 September 2021 (aged 84) Belgrade, Serbia

Career information
- NBA draft: 1959: undrafted
- Playing career: 1954–1974
- Position: Guard
- Number: 10

Career history
- 1954–1955: Mladost Zemun
- 1956–1957: Proleter Kreka
- 1959–1966: OKK Beograd
- 1967–1974: Mladost Zemun

Brunislav "Bruno" Pavelić (Serbian Cyrillic: Брунислав "Бруно" Павелић; 4 March 1937 – 28 September 2021), was a Serbian basketball player.

== Playing career ==
Pavelić grew up playing basketball with KK Lokomotiva Zemun. Also, he occasionally played football in FK Jedinstvo Zemun with Vladica Popović. Eventually, under the influence of coach Miomir Lilić, he decided to go further with basketball. In 1954, he joined the newly established club Mladost Zemun. In 1956, he moved to KK Proleter Kreka, where he played for two seasons before he went to serve compulsory military service in the Yugoslav People's Army.

Pavelić played for OKK Beograd under Bora Stanković and Aleksandar Nikolić during the 1960s. At the time, his teammates were Radivoj Korać, Slobodan Gordić, Miodrag Nikolić, and Trajko Rajković among others. He won three Yugoslav League championships and two Yugoslav Cups. Afterwards, he returned to Mladost Zemun where he played until retirement in 1974.

== Post-playing career ==
While playing for OKK Beograd, Pavelić also worked at the Industry of Machinery and Tractors (IMT). Between 1969 and 1973, he was a technical director at the Novi Beograd Sports Hall. In 1973, he was named a technical director at the Pinki Hall, where he worked until his retirement in 2001.

== Personal life ==
His father was a recipient of the Commemorative Medal of the Partisans of 1941. Pavelić is not related to Ante Pavelić, Croatian fascist politician and dictator.

== Career achievements ==
- Yugoslav League champion: 3 (with OKK Beograd: 1960, 1963, 1964).
- Yugoslav Cup winner: 2 (with OKK Beograd: 1960, 1962)
