= Vlade Đurović =

Serbian basketball player and coach (born 1948)

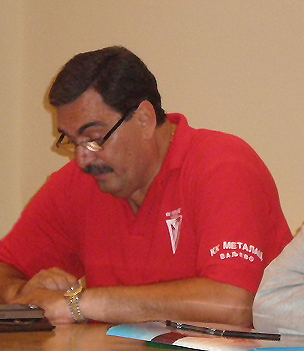
- Đurović in 2008

Personal information
- Born: 16 May 1948 (age 78) Belgrade, PR Serbia, FPR Yugoslavia

Career information
- Playing career: 1965–1973
- Position: Power forward
- Coaching career: 1973–2019

Career history

Playing
- 1965–1973: OKK Beograd

Coaching
- 1973–1978: OKK Beograd (assistant)
- 1978–1982: Sloboda Tuzla
- 1982–1984: Šibenka
- 1984–1985: Budućnost
- 1985–1986: Zadar
- 1986–1988: Crvena zvezda
- 1988–1993: Panionios
- 1993–1994: Aris
- 1994–1995: AEK
- 1995–1996: Limoges CSP
- 1996–1997: Panionios
- 1997: AEL Limassol
- 1997–1998: Oostende (Telindus)
- 1998–1999: Okapi Aalstar
- 1999–2000: Dafni
- 2000: Achilleas
- 2000–2001: Okapi Aalstar
- 2001–2002: ASVEL (assistant)
- 2002: Budućnost
- 2002–2004: FMP
- 2004–2005: Lietuvos rytas
- 2005: NIS Vojvodina
- 2005–2006: Mega Ishrana
- 2006–2007: CSKA Sofia
- 2008–2009: Metalac Valjevo
- 2009: Vojvodina Srbijagas
- 2009–2010: FMP
- 2011–2013, 2015–2016: OKK Beograd
- 2018–2019: US Monastir
Medals
Men's basketball
Head Coach for Serbia and Montenegro
Universiade
Gold medal – first place	2003 Daegu	Team

Vlade Đurović (Serbian Cyrillic: Владе Ђуровић; born 16 May 1948) is a Serbian professional basketball coach and former player.

== Early life ==
Born in 1948 to Bosnian Serb parents Danilo Đurović from Sokolac and Mileva Cerović from Rogatica—both active World War II Partisan resistance participants who had met during their time fighting the guerrilla war, then following the war moved to the Yugoslav capital Belgrade, got married and started a family—young Vlade grew up in the Belgrade neighborhood of Cerak. His father Danilo fought the war in a unit headed by the well-known communist commander Slaviša Vajner Čiča, and, by the time the conflict ended, rose to the rank of major in the Yugoslav secret police, UDBA, all of which facilitated his relocation to Belgrade where the new, communist, authorities provided him with an apartment unit in a newly-built housing complex as the country transformed from a pre-war monarchy into a Stalinist people's republic.

Growing up in Cerak, across the road from Belgrade Fair grounds, the athletic youngster excelled in various sports, including football, basketball, and handball. Among the neighbourhood friends adolescent Đurović played street football with, Blagoje Paunović—residing in the same apartment building as Đurović—would later go on to a professional football career. At one point during the late 1950s, young Đurović himself pursued football in a more structured environment, registering for a tryout at Red Star Belgrade's youth categories run by the up-and-coming young coach Miljan Miljanić. However, due to not having an ID card on him that day, pre-teen Đurović's height and strong physique (compared to that of his age group peers) made Miljanić suspicious about the youngster's stated age. As a result, Miljanić sent the young applicant back, telling him to return with an ID card, which young Đurović, somewhat put off by the experience, never did.

Instead, on suggestion from schoolmate Marijan "Šilja" Novović who had already been playing basketball in the OKK Beograd youth system, fifteen-year-old high school (gymnasium) first-year student Đurović went over to OKK where, following a single practice session, he was immediately given a spot in the OKK junior team's starting five by the youth team coach Glišić.

After two years of playing the power forward position in the club's juniors, seventeen-year-old Đurović was attached to the full squad by its head coach Bora Stanković. Two more junior team players, Novović and Vladimir Cvetić, were attached to the full squad on the same occasion.

== Playing career ==
Joining OKK Beograd, Yugoslav league champions—a squad laden with exceptional players and Yugoslav national team members Radivoj Korać, Sija Nikolić, Rica Gordić, and Trajko Rajković— Đurović's debut season, 1965, was mostly spent on the bench.

He ended up playing until 1973.

== Coaching career ==
By the end of his playing career, he wanted to stay at OKK Beograd, he finished a coaching school and became the first professional in the history of the "OKK Belgrade." In the "OKK Belgrade" has worked with juniors and cadets. For his coaching career he was thankful to his godbrother Bogdan Tanjević, who persuaded him to train Sloboda Dita from Tuzla, and thus begins his coaching career (1978).

In 1982 Đurović, became head coach of Šibenka and he had the extraordinary luck to train young Dražen Petrović. In 1983 he won the championship title with Šibenka but only for sixteen hours, as the Board of Directors of the Basketball Association of Yugoslavia, to an urgently convened session, decided to cancel the game and ordered a rematch in Novi Sad. Šibenka decided to boycott it, and the title was awarded to Bosna. In the same year reached with Šibenka, the final of FIBA Korać Cup but was defeated for the second consecutive time by the same team, the French Limoges CSP of Richard Dacoury and Ed Murphy.

After a one-year passage from Titograd and Budućnost, the summer of 1985 he joined Zadar. He stayed there just one year and led the team to the league title against back-to-back European Champions Cibona although Zadar struggled to the playoff finals with handicap seat. The 1986-87 season he was found to train the team of Crvena zvezda and despite the fourth place in the regular season ranking, his team overcame the obstacle of Cibona in the semifinal and had the opportunity to claim the title towards super talented and young team of Partizan. Eventually, the title was lost with 0-2 defeats. In his second year in Zvezda, incidentally that was the last of Yugoslavia over the next 14 years, he didn't manage something important in the domestic competitions, while in the Korać Cup reached the semifinals were eliminated rather easily by subsequent winner of institutional, Real Madrid.

In 1988 he went to Greece to coaching Panionios which these days was the third great power in the Greek League behind the eternal enemies of Thessaloniki, Aris and PAOK. Τhere depending on the competition, which began gradually to grow, succeed maintaining Panionios in the first four league positions and some march to their quarterfinals of Korac Cup in 1990 and 1993. His greatest success, however, was the victory in the final of Greek Cup towards the recently European Cup Champions PAOK of his old player in Zvezda, Branislav Prelević. In 1993, Vlade Đurović leaves Panionios although the team that year had a roster capable of great things both in Greece and in the Korać Cup. The next two years had a pass from Aris and AEK without accomplishing something great. On 17 April 1996 Đurović got a job in Limoges until the end of the season with a view to lead the team in winning the French Cup and the second position for participation in playoffs. From now he began to decline his coaching career after he was found to train clubs beyond the high European level in Cyprus and Belgium. In December 2011 Vlade returned after 23 years at home in OKK Belgrade.

== Post-coaching career ==
Đurović became the president of the Board for OKK Beograd on 7 October 2017. He left the position in September 2019.

He is a frequent in-studio pundit on Radio Television of Serbia and Arena Sport basketball broadcasts.

== Career achievements ==
- Yugoslav League champion: 1 (with Zadar: 1985–86)
- Greek Cup winner: 1 (with Panionios: 1990–91)
- Belgian Cup winner: 1 (with Oostende: 1997–98)
- Cypriot Cup winner: 1 (with Achilleas Kaimakli: 1999–2000)
- Serbian and Montenegrin Cup winner: 1 (with FMP: 2002–03)
- Serbian League Cup winner: 1 (with Metalac: 2008–09)

== See also ==
- List of Radivoj Korać Cup-winning head coaches

== Notes ==
1. His first name is often incorrectly spelled as Vlado (his nickname) and in Greece, he is often (incorrectly) referred to as Vlado Jurović.
