= Ljubomir Stanković =

Serbian basketball player (1945–2011)

Ljubiša Stanković
Personal information
- Born: 1945 Belgrade
- Died: 2011 (aged 65–66) Belgrade, Serbia

Career information
- NBA draft: 1967: undrafted
- Playing career: 1961–1969
- Position: Point guard
- Number: 9

Career history
- 1961–1969: OKK Beograd

Ljubomir "Ljubiša" Stanković (Serbian Cyrillic: Љубомир "Љубиша" Станковић; 1945–2011), was a Serbian basketball player and administrator who spent his entire basketball career with OKK Beograd.

== Playing career ==
Stanković spent entire playing career with OKK Beograd during the 1960s. At the time, his teammates were Radivoj Korać, Slobodan Gordić, Miodrag Nikolić, and Trajko Rajković. He won two Yugoslav League championships and a Yugoslav Cup. He retired as a player in 1969.

== Post-playing career ==
After retirement in 1969, Stanković joined a management of OKK Beograd. Later, he became the club's president. His club won a Yugoslav Cup in 1993.

Stanković was one of founders and a staff member of the Crvena Zvezda Bowling Club, with whom he won two national titles (1991–92, 1992–93).

== Career achievements ==
As player

- Yugoslav League champion: 2 (with OKK Beograd: 1963, 1964).
- Yugoslav Cup winner: 1 (with OKK Beograd: 1962)

As executive

- Yugoslav Cup winner: 1 (with OKK Beograd: 1993)
