= List of Yugoslav First Federal Basketball League annual scoring leaders =

The Yugoslav First Federal Basketball League Top Scorer was the annual award for the leading points scorers of each season's Yugoslav First Federal League, which was the top-tier level basketball competition between sports clubs in the former country of Yugoslavia. The title of the Yugoslav First Federal League's Top Scorer was awarded to the player that had the highest points per game scoring average, in a given individual league season.

== Key ==
^		Inducted into the FIBA Hall of Fame			
*		Inducted into the Naismith Memorial Basketball Hall of Fame			
^*		Inducted into both Halls of Fame			
Player (X)		Denotes the number of times the player had been the scoring leader up to and including that season			
G	Guard	F	Forward	C	Center

== Scoring leaders ==
Season	Player	Age (Note: At the start of February 1st of that season.)	Pos (Note: The player's primary position is listed first.)	Club	Games played	Total points	Points per game	Ref.
1946	Ladislav Demšar	17	C	Egység Novi Sad	7	69	9.9	
1947	Novaković			Proleter	4	69	17.3	
1948	Novaković (2×)			Proleter	5	69	13.8	
1949	Ivan Arapović	37		Jedinstvo Zagreb	18	211	11.7	
1950	Mirko Amon	19–20		Železničar Ljubljana	18	268	14.9	
1951	Janez Škrjanc	22		Enotnost	22	315	14.3	
1952	Vilmos Lóczi	27		Proleter	3	55	18.3	
1953	Milan Bjegojević	24	G	Crvena zvezda	6	106	17.7	
1954	Boris Kristančič	22		Enotnost	20	543	27.2	
1955	Borislav Ćurčić	23		Crvena zvezda	18	381	21.2	
1956	Jože Zupančič	20–21		Ljubljana	18	463	25.7	
1957	Radivoj Korać^*	18	F	BSK	18	530	29.4	
1958	Radivoj Korać^* (2×)	19	F	OKK Beograd	17	638	37.5	
1959	Branko Radović	25		Crvena zvezda	18	549	30.5	
1960	Radivoj Korać^* (3×)	21	F	OKK Beograd	17	664	39.1	
1961	Zlatko Sajkov			Dinamo Pančevo	18	549	30.5	
1962	Radivoj Korać^* (4×)	23	F	OKK Beograd	18	638	35.4	
1963	Radivoj Korać^* (5×)	24	F	OKK Beograd	17	621	36.5	
1964	Radivoj Korać^* (6×)	25	F	OKK Beograd	14	475	33.9	
1965	Radivoj Korać^* (7×)	26	F	OKK Beograd	20	695	34.8	
1966	Vladimir Cvetković	24	F	Crvena zvezda	22	755	34.3	
1967	Vladimir Cvetković (2×)	25	F	Crvena zvezda	21	677	32.2	
1967–68	Radmilo Mišović	24	G	Borac Čačak	21	645	30.7	
1968–69	Radmilo Mišović (2×)	25	G	Borac Čačak	22	625	28.4	
1969–70	Nikola Plećaš	22	G	Lokomotiva	22	679	30.9	
1970–71	Radmilo Mišović (3×)	27	G	Borac Čačak	22	645	29.3	
1971–72	Radmilo Mišović (4×)	28	G	Borac Čačak	22	660	30.0	
1972–73	Damir Šolman	24	F	Jugoplastika	26	801	30.1	
1973–74	Radmilo Mišović (5×)	30	G	Borac Čačak	26	825	31.7	
1974–75	Nikola Plećaš (2×)	27	G	Lokomotiva	26	862	33.2	
1975–76	Dragan Kićanović^	22	G	Partizan	25	777	31.1	
1976–77	Dražen Dalipagić^*	25	F	Partizan	26	900	34.6	
1977–78	Dragan Kićanović^ (2×)	24	G	Partizan	26	849	34.4	
1978–79	Dragan Kićanović^ (3×)	25	G	Partizan	22	743	33.8	
1979–80	Branko Skroče	24	G	Zadar	22	695	31.6	
1980–81	Branko Skroče (2×)	25	G	Zadar	22	772	35.1	
1981–82	Dražen Dalipagić^* (2×)	30	F	Partizan	30	944	31.5	
1982–83	Duško Ivanović	25	G	Budućnost	26	603	27.4	
1983–84	Branko Skroče (3×)	28	G	Zadar		578		
1984–85	Dražen Petrović^*	20	G	Cibona	20	640	32.0	
1985–86	Dražen Petrović^* (2×)	21	G	Cibona	21	905	43.1	
1986–87	Dražen Petrović^* (3×)	22	G	Cibona	21	779	37.1	
1987–88	Dražen Petrović^* (4×)	23	G	Cibona	19	722	38.0	
1988–89	Milan Mlađan	27	F	IMT	22	677	30.8	
1989–90	Arijan Komazec	20	G	Zadar	22	690	31.4	
1990–91	Arijan Komazec (2×)	21	G	Zadar	22	645	29.3	
1991–92	Boban Janković	28	F	Crvena zvezda	19	484	25.5	

== See also ==
- Yugoslav First Federal League career stats leaders
- ABA League Top Scorer
