= Đorđe Otašević =

Yugoslav basketball player

Career history
- 1954: Crvena zvezda
- 1957–1959: OKK Beograd

Đorđe Otašević (Serbian Cyrillic: Ђорђе Оташевић) was a Yugoslav basketball player.

== Playing career ==
During his playing career in the 1950s, Otašević was on Belgrade-based teams Crvena zvezda and OKK Beograd and of the Yugoslav Federal League. During his only season with the Zvezda he won the 1954 Yugoslav Championship. Later, he joined OKK Beograd where he played with Radivoj Korać, Slobodan Gordić, and Miodrag Nikolić. With them he won the 1958 Yugoslav Championship and lost a Yugoslav Cup final in 1959.

== Career achievements ==
- Yugoslav League champion: 2 (with Crvena zvezda: 1954; with OKK Beograd: 1958)
