= Bogomir Rajković =

Serbian basketball player

Personal information
- Born: 14 November 1932 (age 94) Subotica, Yugoslavia

Career information
- NBA draft: 1954: undrafted
- Playing career: 1950–1962, 1965–1966
- Position: Point guard
- Number: 11

Career history
- 1950–1952: Radnički Beograd
- 1953–1962, 1965–1966: BSK / OKK Beograd

Bogomir "Đakica" Rajković (Serbian Cyrillic: Богомир "Ђакица" Рајковић; born 17 July 1932), is a Serbian former professional basketball player.

== Playing career ==
Rajković played a point guard position. He played for Radnički Beograd prior he joined BSK (later renamed to OKK Beograd) in 1953. He played under coaches Strahinja Alagić, Borislav Stanković, and Aleksandar Nikolić until his retirement in 1966. At the time, his teammates were Radivoj Korać, Slobodan Gordić, Miodrag Nikolić, Milorad Erkić, and Trajko Rajković among others. He won two Yugoslav League championships and two Yugoslav Cups with OKK Beograd rosters.

== Career achievements ==
- Yugoslav League champion: 2 (with OKK Beograd: 1958, 1960).
- Yugoslav Cup winner: 2 (with OKK Beograd: 1960, 1962)
