= Milorad Erkić =

Serbian basketball coach and player

Personal information
- Born: 17 July 1932 Kragujevac, Yugoslavia
- Died: 10 August 2009 (aged 77) Belgrade, Serbia

Career information
- NBA draft: 1954: undrafted
- Playing career: 1950–1965
- Number: 14
- Coaching career: 1965–1967

Career history

Playing
- 1950–1951: Radnički Kragujevac
- 1953–1965: BSK / OKK Beograd

Coaching
- 1965–1967: OKK Beograd (youth)

Milorad Erkić (Serbian Cyrillic: Милорад Еркић; 17 July 1932 – 10 August 2009), was a Serbian professional basketball coach, player and executive.

== Early life and education ==
Erkić grew up playing basketball with his hometown team Radnički Kragujevac. After his high school, he moved to Belgrade where he enrolled to the University of Belgrade Faculty of Law in 1951.

== Playing career ==
On 1 August 1952, Erkić joined Belgrade-based team BSK (later renamed to OKK Beograd). He played under coaches Strahinja Alagić, Borislav Stanković, and Aleksandar Nikolić until his retirement on 1965. On 21 March 1965, he made his last official game in a 119–96 win over Real Madrid. At the time, his teammates were Radivoj Korać, Slobodan Gordić, Miodrag Nikolić, and Trajko Rajković among others. He won four Yugoslav League championships and two Yugoslav Cups.

== Post-playing career ==
After retirement in 1965, Erkić joined a youth system of OKK Beograd as a coach. He had left coaching two years later as he became a general manager of the club. He was a general manager until early 1990s. Afterwards, Erkić was a youth system coordinator at the club.

== Career achievements ==
- Yugoslav League champion: 4 (with OKK Beograd: 1958, 1960, 1963, 1964).
- Yugoslav Cup winner: 2 (with OKK Beograd: 1960, 1962)
