= We Will Be the World Champions =

2015 film

- Film poster
- Directed by: Darko Bajić
- Written by: Jelena Brkić; Ognjen Sviličić
- Starring: Strahinja Banić
- Release date: 26 February 2015
- Running time: 127 minutes
- Country: Serbia
- Language: Serbian

We Will Be the World Champions (Serbian: Бићемо прваци света, Bićemo prvaci sveta) is a 2015 Serbian sports drama film directed by Darko Bajić. It was one of six films shortlisted by Serbia to be their submission for the Academy Award for Best Foreign Language Film at the 88th Academy Awards, but lost out to Enclave. The film is based on the true story of the Yugoslavia national basketball team who won the 1970 FIBA World Championship.

== Plot ==
The film tells the story of the four men who founded the Yugoslav basketball school and who significantly contributed to the development of basketball in Europe - Nebojša Popović, Borislav Stanković, Radomir Šaper and Aleksandar Nikolić. The main event is the final match of the 1970 FIBA World Championship, held in Ljubljana between the national teams of Yugoslavia and the United States.

== Cast ==
The Four Pioneers

- Strahinja Blažić as Nebojša Popović
- Aleksandar Radojičić as Bora Stanković
- Miloš Biković as Radomir Šaper, the president of the Basketball Federation of Yugoslavia
- Marko Janketić as Aleksandar Nikolić,

Team Roster

- Sergej Trifunović as Ranko Žeravica, the head coach
- Saško Kocev as Lazar Lečić, the assistant coach
- Igor Kovač as Ratomir Tvrdić
- Jovan Belobrković as Ljubodrag Simonović
- Dražen Lakić as Vinko Jelovac
- Miodrag Radonjić as Trajko Rajković
- Toni Cahunek as Aljoša Žorga
- Stefan Kapičić as Dragan Kapičić. Kapičić plays the role of his own father.
- Jure Henigman as Ivo Daneu
- Krešimir Petar Ćosić as Krešimir Ćosić. Ćosić plays the role of his own father.
- Matko Knesaurek as Damir Šolman
- Goran Bogdan as Nikola Plećaš
- Peđa Marjanović as Dragutin Čermak
- Robert Kurbaša as Petar Skansi

Other characters

- Leon Lučev as Major Dane Štukalo
- Iva Babic as Maja Bedeković-Popović, wife of Nebojša Popović and Crvena zvezda player
- Nina Janković as Ljubica Otašević, Crvena zvezda player
- Radovan Vujović as Srđan Kalember, Crvena zvezda player
- Stevan Piale as Aleksandar Gec, Crvena zvezda player
- Nebojša Dugalić as Vladimir Dedijer
- Jasa Jamnik as Stane Dolanc
- Miša Nestorović as Aristotle Onassis
- Dejan Denić as Radivoj Korać
- Boban Marjanović as Jānis Krūmiņš (uncredited cameo)
- Lazar Ristovski as Tito
- John Savage as William Jones, the Secretary General of the FIBA.

== See also ==
- List of basketball films
