= Slobodan Gordić =

Serbian basketball player (1938–2022)

Personal information
- Born: 28 September 1937 Čačak, Kingdom of Yugoslavia
- Died: 22 November 2022 (aged 85) Brussels, Belgium
- Listed height: 1.92 m (6 ft 4 in)
- Listed weight: 93 kg (205 lb)

Career information
- NBA draft: 1959: undrafted
- Playing career: 1954–1976
- Number: 4

Career history
- 1954–1967: OKK Beograd
- 1967–1968: JA Vichy
- 1968–1970: Mechelen
- 1970–1972: Battel Mechelen
- 1972–1976: Maccabi Brussels

Career highlights
- FIBA European Selection (1964); 4× Yugoslav League champion (1958, 1960, 1963, 1964); 2× Yugoslav Cup winner (1960, 1962)
Medals
Men's basketball
Representing Yugoslavia
FIBA World Championship
Silver medal – second place	1963 Brasil	Team
EuroBasket
Silver medal – second place	1961 Yugoslavia	Team
Silver medal – second place	1965 Soviet Union	Team
Bronze medal – third place	1963 Poland	Team
Mediterranean Games
Gold medal – first place	1959 Lebanon	Team

Slobodan "Rica" Gordić (Serbian Cyrillic: Слободан "Рица" Гордић; 28 September 1937 – 22 November 2022) was a Serbian professional basketball player. He represented the Yugoslavia national basketball team internationally.

== Playing career ==
Gordić played for OKK Beograd during their so-called 'Golden Era' in the late 1950s and the first half of the 1960s in the Yugoslav First League. His teammates were Radivoj Korać, Miodrag Nikolić, Bogomir Rajković, Trajko Rajković and Milorad Erkić. OKK Beograd's coaches during that time were Borislav Stanković and Aleksandar Nikolić and sports director was Radomir Šaper. In that period they won four Yugoslav League championships and two Yugoslav Cups.

During the 1967–68 season, Gordić played for a French team JA Vichy led by Đorđe Andrijašević. In 1968, he went to Belgium where he played in their Basketball League.

== National team career ==
As a player for the Yugoslavia national basketball team Gordić has played from 1958 to 1965. He participated at the 1963 FIBA World Championship in Brazil, and four EuroBasket (1959 in Turkey, 1961 in Yugoslavia, 1963 in Poland and 1965 in Soviet Union) and two Summer Olympics (1960 in Rome and 1964 in Tokyo). Gordić won the silver medal at the 1963 World Championship, as well as two silver medals (1961, 1965) and a bronze medal (1963) at EuroBasket. Also, he won the gold medal at the 1959 Mediterranean Games in Lebanon.

== Post-playing career ==
On 1 October 1973, Gordić got employed at the Belgian supermarket chain GB in Brussels. He worked there until 1996.

Gordić died in Brussels on 22 November 2022, at the age of 85.

== Career achievements ==
- Yugoslav League champion: 4 (with OKK Beograd: 1958, 1960, 1963 and 1964).
- Yugoslav Cup winner: 2 (with OKK Beograd: 1960, 1962).
