= Miodrag Nikolić =

Serbian basketball player and coach

Personal information
- Born: 22 August 1938 Belgrade, Kingdom of Yugoslavia
- Died: 17 February 2005 (aged 66)
- Listed height: 1.88 m (6 ft 2 in)
- Listed weight: 83 kg (183 lb)

Career information
- NBA draft: 1960: undrafted
- Playing career: 1954–1970
- Number: 3, 15

Career history

Playing
- 1954–1957: Radnički Belgrade
- 1957–1967: OKK Beograd
- 1967–1968: Altınordu
- 1968–1970: ITU Istanbul

Coaching
- 1979–1980: Crvena zvezda (assistant)

Career highlights
- As player: FIBA European Selection (1964); 4× Yugoslav League champion (1958, 1960, 1963, 1964); Turkish League champion (1970); 2× Yugoslav Cup winner (1960, 1962); 2× Turkish Cup winner (1968, 1969)
Medals
Men's basketball
Representing Yugoslavia
FIBA World Cup
Silver medal – second place	1963 Brasil	Team
EuroBasket
Silver medal – second place	1961 Yugoslavia	Team
Bronze medal – third place	1963 Poland	Team
Mediterranean Games
Gold medal – first place	1959 Lebanon	Team
Balkan Basketball Championship
Gold medal – first place	1961 Yugoslavia	Team
Silver medal – second place	1960 Bulgaria	Team

Miodrag "Sija" Nikolić (Serbian Cyrillic: Миодрaг "Сија" Николић; 22 August 1938 – 17 February 2005) was a Serbian professional basketball player and coach. He represented the Yugoslavia national basketball team internationally.

== Playing career ==
Nikolić played for OKK Beograd, during their so-called, "Golden Era", in the late 1950s, and the first half of the 1960s, in the Yugoslav First League. Some of his teammates were Radivoj Korać, Slobodan Gordić, Bogomir Rajković, Trajko Rajković, and Milorad Erkić. OKK Beograd's head coaches during that time were Borislav Stanković and Aleksandar Nikolić, and the club's Sports Director was Radomir Šaper. In that period, they won four Yugoslav League championships, and two Yugoslav Cups. During the 1965 Yugoslav League season, Nikolić got injured, at a home game against AŠK Olimpija, and he missed the rest of the season.

After recovering from the injury, Nikolić went to Turkey, where he played for Altınordu Izmir and ITU Istanbul, in the Turkish Super League.

== National team career ==
Nikolić was a member of the Yugoslavian national basketball team from 1957 to 1964. He played at one FIBA World Cup (1963 in Brazil), and at four EuroBaskets (1957 in Bulgaria, 1959 in Turkey, 1961 in Yugoslavia, and 1963 in Poland). He also played at two Summer Olympics (1960 in Rome, and 1964 in Tokyo). Nikolić won a silver medal at the 1963 FIBA World Championship, as well as a silver medal (1961) and one bronze (1963) at the EuroBasket. He also won a gold medal at the 1959 Mediterranean Games, in Lebanon.

== Coaching career ==
During his coaching career, Nikolić was the head coach of the senior national teams of Qatar, Bahrain, and Kuwait.

== Career achievements ==
- Yugoslav League champion: 4 (with OKK Beograd: 1958, 1960, 1963 and 1964).
- Turkish Super League champion: 1 (with ITU Istanbul: 1969–70).
- Yugoslav Cup winner: 2 (with OKK Beograd: 1960, 1962).
- Turkish Cup winner: 2 (with Altınordu: 1968; with ITU Istanbul: 1969).
