= Tomislav Tomović =

Serbian basketball player and coach

Tomislav Tomović Томислав Томовић
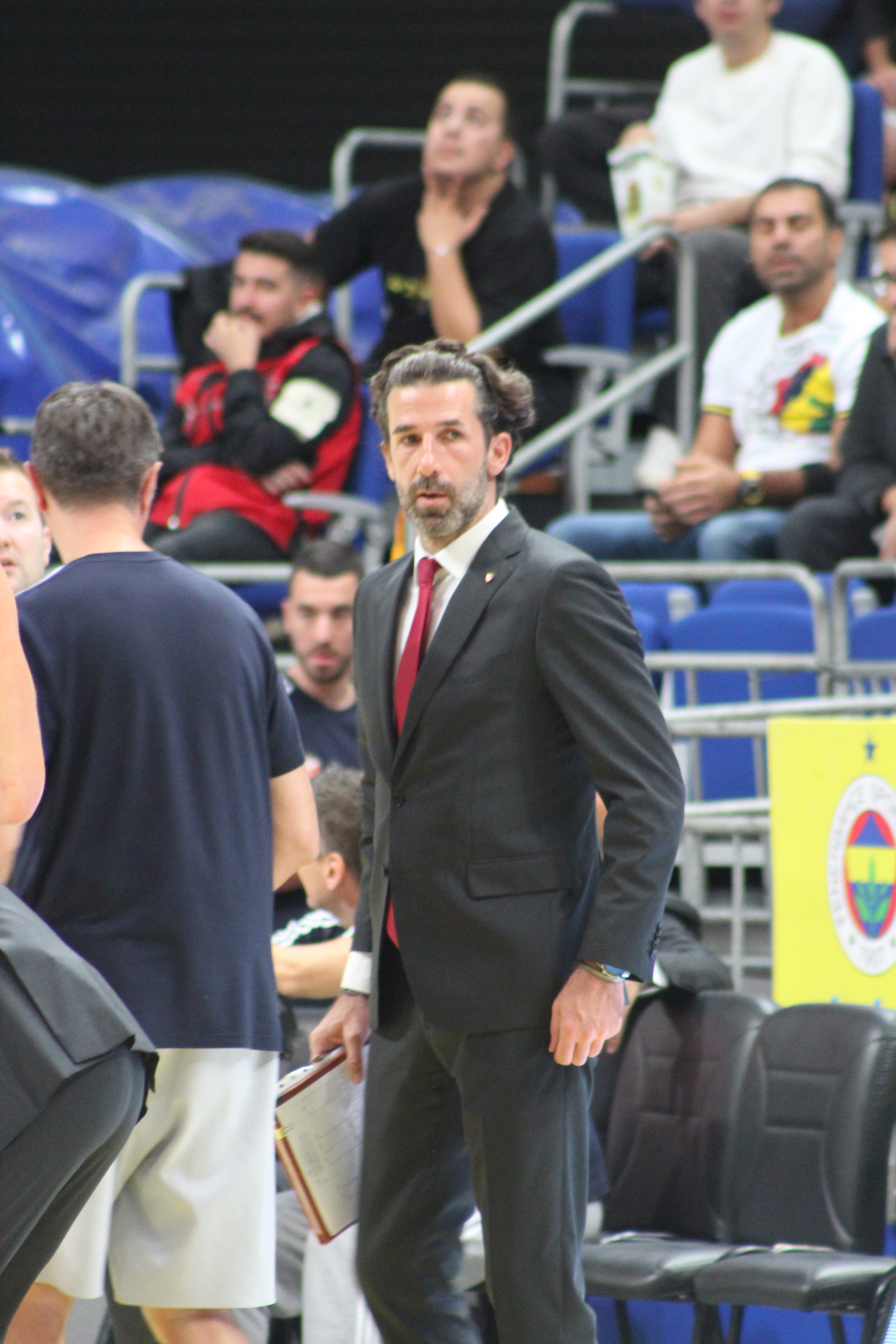
- Tomović in 2024

Lokomotiv Kuban
- Title: Head coach
- League: VTB United League

Personal information
- Born: 13 May 1983 (age 43) Belgrade, SR Serbia, Yugoslavia
- Listed height: 1.94 m (6 ft 4 in)
- Listed weight: 90 kg (198 lb)

Career information
- NBA draft: 2005: undrafted
- Playing career: 2001–2010
- Position: Point guard
- Number: 5
- Coaching career: 2010–present

Career history

Playing
- 2001–2002: Crvena zvezda
- 2002–2003: Yambolgaz 92
- 2003–2004: Borac Banjalučka pivara
- 2004–2006: Bosna
- 2006: Panionios
- 2006–2007: Bosna
- 2007–2008: Mega Aqua Monta
- 2008: Bosna
- 2009–2010: Zrinjski

Coaching
- 2010–2012: OKK Beograd (assistant)
- 2012–2015: Slodes
- 2015–2021: Shandong Heroes (assistant)
- 2022–2023: Mega Basket (assistant)
- 2023–2026: Crvena zvezda (assistant)
- 2025: Crvena zvezda (interim)
- 2026–present: Lokomotiv Kuban

Career highlights
- As player: 3× Bosnian League champion (2005, 2006, 2008); Bosnian Cup winner (2005); Best Young Athlete of Yugoslavia (2001)
Medals
Men's basketball
Representing FR Yugoslavia
FIBA U16 European Championship
Gold medal – first place	1999 Slovenia	U16 Team
Assistant coach for Serbia
U18 European Championship
Silver medal – second place	2014 Turkey	U18 Team

Tomislav Tomović (Serbian Cyrillic: Томислав Томовић; born 13 May 1983) is a Serbian professional basketball coach and former player. He is currently the head coach for Lokomotiv Kuban of the VTB United League.

== Professional career ==
A point guard, Tomović played for Crvena zvezda, Yambolgaz 92, Borac Banjalučka pivovara, Bosna, Panionios, Mega Aqua Monta, and Zrinjski.

== National team career ==
In July 1999, Tomović was a member of the Yugoslavia U16 national team that won the gold medal at the European Championship for Cadets in Slovenia. Over eight tournament games, he averaged 2.1 points, 1.2 rebounds, and 0.6 assists per game.

== Coaching career ==
In August 2012, Tomović was hired as an assistant coach for OKK Beograd under Srđan Jeković.

In August 2014, Tomović was an assistant coach for the Serbia national under-18 team under Aleksandar Bućan that won the silver medal at the FIBA Europe Under-18 Championship in Konya, Turkey.

In 2015, Tomović was hired as an assistant coach for the Shandong Golden Stars under Aleksandar Kesar. Later, he was an assistant coach for Guangxi Weizhuang, Sichuan Blue Whales, Qingdao Eagles, and Shandong Heroes.

On 20 June 2022, Mega Basket hired Tomović as their new assistant coach to head coach Marko Barać.

=== National teams ===
In July 2019, Tomović was an assistant coach for the Serbia under-19 team under Aleksandar Bućan at the FIBA Under-19 Basketball World Cup in Heraklion, Greece. In July 2022, Tomović was an assistant coach for the Serbia national under-17 team under Dragoljub Avramović that finished the fifth at the 2022 FIBA Under-17 Basketball World Cup in Spain.

== Career achievements ==
As player

- Bosnia and Herzegovina League champion: 3 (with Bosna: 2004–05, 2005–06, 2007–08)
- Cup of Bosnia and Herzegovina winner: 1 (with Bosna: 2004–05)

Awards
Preceded by Nataša Janić	(Federal Republic of Yugoslavia) The Best Young Athlete of Yugoslavia; 2001	Succeeded by Ivan Kolić
