= Rajačić =

Rajačić (Serbian: Рајачић) is a Serbian surname. It may refer to:

- Josif Rajačić (1785–1861), Serbian Orthodox archbishop
- Branislav Rajačić (1931–1992), Yugoslav Serbian basketball coach
- Zdravko Rajačić (1952–2008), Serbian basketball coach

== See also ==
- Rajčić
