= 1958 Yugoslav First Basketball League =

- League: Yugoslav First Basketball League
- Sport: Basketball

1958
- Season champions: (Socialist Republic of Serbia) OKK Beograd

Yugoslav First Basketball League seasons
- ← 1957 1959 →

== Teams ==
(Socialist Republic of Serbia) PR Serbia
- Crvena Zvezda
- OKK Beograd
- Partizan
- Proleter Zrenjanin
- Radnički Belgrade
(Socialist Republic of Croatia) PR Croatia
- Jugomontaža
- Lokomotiva
- Zadar
(Socialist Republic of Slovenia) PR Slovenia
- ŽKK Ljubljana
- Olimpija

== Classification ==
	Season ranking 1958	Pt	G	W	D	L	PF	PA
1.	OKK Beograd	32	18	16	0	2	1512	1235
2.	Olimpija	26	18	12	2	4	1423	1254
3.	Crvena Zvezda	22 (-1)	18	11	1	6	1278	1148
4.	Zadar	20	18	9	2	7	1429	1423
5.	Ljubljana	20	18	10	0	8	1240	1274
6.	Partizan	17	18	8	1	9	1241	1280
7.	Proleter Zrenjanin	14	18	6	2	10	1146	1265
8.	Lokomotiva	12	18	6	0	12	1144	1227
9.	Radnički Belgrade	8	18	4	0	14	1055	1256
10.	Jugomontaža	7 (-1)	18	3	2	13	994	1100

The winning roster of OKK Beograd:

- (Socialist Federal Republic of Yugoslavia) Ljubomir Lucić
- (Socialist Federal Republic of Yugoslavia) Miodrag Nikolić
- (Socialist Federal Republic of Yugoslavia) Slobodan Gordić
- (Socialist Federal Republic of Yugoslavia) Radivoj Korać
- (Socialist Federal Republic of Yugoslavia) Slobodan Nešić
- (Socialist Federal Republic of Yugoslavia) Miodrag Popović
- (Socialist Federal Republic of Yugoslavia) Đorđe Otašević
- (Socialist Federal Republic of Yugoslavia) Bogomir Rajković
- (Socialist Federal Republic of Yugoslavia) Vojislav Jovanović
- (Socialist Federal Republic of Yugoslavia) Milorad Erkić
- (Socialist Federal Republic of Yugoslavia) Marko Marković

Coach: (Socialist Federal Republic of Yugoslavia) Borislav Stanković

== Scoring leaders ==
1. Radivoj Korać (OKK Beograd) – ___ points (35.2 ppg)
2. ???
3. ???

== Qualification in 1958-59 season European competitions ==
FIBA European Champions Cup

- OKK Beograd (champions)
