= Zlatna levica, priča o Radivoju Koraću =

- Directed by: Gordan Matić
- Written by: Gordan Matić
- Produced by: Marko Paljic
- Starring: Radivoj Korać
- Release date: 2011
- Country: Serbia
- Language: Serbian

Zlatna levica, priča o Radivoju Koraću (Serbian: Златна левица, прича о Радивоја Кораћа, lit. 'The Golden Left Hand: The Radivoj Korać Story') is a 2011 Serbian biopic and documentary film directed by Gordan Matić. It tells the story of Radivoj Korać, a famous Serbian basketball player.

The film premiered in August 2011 in Kaunas during EuroBasket 2011 ahead of the tournament's knockout stage where it was screened for members of FIBA Europe, journalists covering the tournament, and representatives of the national teams that made the quarterfinals. In December 2011 it was shown at the film festival in Palermo. It premiered in Serbia on 16 February 2012.

After its theatrical life, it is set to be broadcast as three-episode television mini-series during fall 2012.

== Plot ==
The documentary part is narrated by basketball players Saša Đorđević and Milenko Tepić featuring appearances by Korać's contemporaries such as Ivo Daneu, Josip Đerđa, Dragutin Čermak, Pedro Ferrándiz, Clifford Luyk, etc.

The feature part dramatizes events from Korać's life.

== Cast ==
- Vladimir Aleksic (glumac) ... Radivoj Korać
- Voja Brajović ... Josip Broz Tito
- Tihomir Stanić ... Ivo Andrić
- Katarina Radivojević ... Radivoje Korać's mother
