= Trajko Rajković =

Yugoslav basketball player

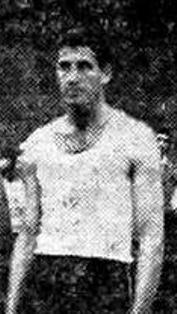
- Rajković with Yugoslavia at the 1968 Olympics in Mexico City.

Personal information
- Born: 7 December 1937 Leskovac, Vardar Banovina, Yugoslavia
- Died: 27 May 1970 (aged 32) Belgrade, SR Serbia, Yugoslavia
- Listed height: 2.10 m (6 ft 11 in)
- Listed weight: 96 kg (212 lb)

Career information
- Playing career: 1956–1970
- Position: Center
- Number: 9, 7, 14

Career history
- 1956–1959: Železničar Belgrade
- 1959–1967: OKK Beograd
- 1967–1968: Fargas Livorno
- 1968–1969: Noalex Venezia
- 1969–1970: OKK Beograd

Career highlights
- 2× FIBA European Selection (1965 2×); Italian League Top Scorer (1968); 3× Yugoslav League champion (1960, 1963, 1964); 2× Yugoslav Cup winner (1960, 1962)
Medals
Men's basketball
Representing Yugoslavia
Olympic Games
Silver medal – second place	1968 Mexico City
FIBA World Cup
Silver medal – second place	1963 Rio de Janeiro
Gold medal – first place	1970 Ljubljana
EuroBasket
Bronze medal – third place	1963 Poland
Silver medal – second place	1965 Russia
Silver medal – second place	1969 Italy

Trajko Rajković (Serbian Cyrillic: Трајко Рајковић; 7 December 1937 – 27 May 1970) was a Yugoslav professional basketball player. He was a member of the FIBA European Selection Teams, in 1965. He represented Yugoslavia internationally.

== Club playing career ==
Rajković played for OKK Beograd, during their so-called "Golden Era", in the late 1950s, and the first half of the 1960s, in the Yugoslav First League. Some of his teammates were: Radivoj Korać, Miodrag Nikolić, Bogomir Rajković, Slobodan Gordić and, Milorad Erkić. OKK Beograd's head coaches during that time were, Borislav Stanković and Aleksandar Nikolić, and the club's sports director at the time was Radomir Šaper. In that period, the club won three Yugoslav League championships, and two Yugoslav Cups.

Rajković went to Italy in 1967, where he played two seasons, with Libertas Livorno and Reyer Venezia, of the Lega Basket Serie A. Rajković was the best scorer of the Italian League's 1967– 68 season, with 521 total points scored.

== National team career ==
Rajković played with the senior Yugoslavian national basketball team, from 1963 to 1970. During his senior national team career, Yugoslavia won two EuroBasket silver medals (1965 and 1969), and one bronze medal (1963). They also won an Olympics silver medal (1968), in Mexico City. He also won a FIBA World Cup silver medal (1963), and a gold medal (1970, in Ljubljana, Slovenia). He played in a total of 113 games with the senior Yugoslav national team.

== Death ==
Rajković died in his sleep due to a heart defect, on 28 May 1970, just four days after winning the World Championship with Yugoslavia (Yugoslavia's first-ever gold at the competition).

He is interred in the Alley of Distinguished Citizens in the Belgrade New Cemetery.

== Personal life ==
He had a wife, Biljana, and a son, Vladimir.

== Career achievements ==
- Yugoslav League champion: 3 (with OKK Beograd: 1960, 1963 and 1964).
- Yugoslav Cup winner: 2 (with OKK Beograd: 1960, 1962).
