= Dejan Mijatović =

Serbian basketball coach and player (born 1968)

MZT Skopje
- Position: Head coach
- League: Macedonian League

Personal information
- Born: September 14, 1968 (age 58) Čačak, SR Serbia, SFR Yugoslavia
- Listed height: 1.96 m (6 ft 5 in)

Career information
- Playing career: 1983–1995
- Coaching career: 1996–present

Career history

Coaching
- 1996–2000: Borac Čačak (assistant)
- 2000–2002: Borac Čačak
- 2002–2003: FMP Železnik (assistant)
- 2003–2004: Lovćen
- 2004–2006: OKK Beograd
- 2006–2007: Hemofarm (assistant)
- 2007–2009: Swisslion Vršac
- 2009–2010: Poznań
- 2010–2011: Alba Berlin (assistant)
- 2014–2015: Czarni Słupsk
- 2015–2016: Al-Ahli Club
- 2016–2017: An Nahl Sharjah
- 2017–2018: Partizan (assistant)
- 2018–2020: EWE Baskets U18
- 2020, 2021: Partizan (assistant)
- 2022–2024: Borac Čačak
- 2026–present: MZT Skopje
Medals
Men's basketball
Head coach for Serbia
U20 European Championship
Bronze medal – third place	2014 Greece	Team
U19 World Championship
Silver medal – second place	2011 Latvia	Team
Silver medal – second place	2013 Czech Republic	Team
U18 European Championship
Gold medal – first place	2007 Spain	Team
Bronze medal – third place	2012 Lithuania/Latvia	Team

Dejan Mijatović (Serbian: Дејан Мијатовић; born September 14, 1968) is a Serbian professional basketball coach and former player who currently serves as the head coach for MZT Skopje of the Macedonian League.

== Playing career ==
Mijatović played basketball for Borac Čačak, Borac Banja Luka, Zastava Kragujevac, Radnički Kragujevac, and Starogard Gdański (Poland).

== Coaching career ==
On 28 November 2022, Borac Čačak hired Mijatović as their new head coach.

== Career achievements and awards ==
Assistant coach

- Radivoj Korać Cup winner: 2 (with FMP: 2002–03; with Partizan NIS: 2017–18)

== Personal life ==
His uncle is Radmilo Mišović, former basketball player.
