= 1960 Yugoslav First Basketball League =

- League: Yugoslav First Basketball League
- Sport: Basketball

1960
- Season champions: (Socialist Republic of Serbia) OKK Beograd

Yugoslav First Basketball League seasons
- ← 1959 1961 →

== Teams ==
(Socialist Republic of Serbia) PR Serbia
- Crvena Zvezda
- OKK Beograd
- Partizan
- Proleter Zrenjanin
- Radnički Belgrade
(Socialist Republic of Croatia) PR Croatia
- Zadar
- Željezničar Karlovac
(Socialist Republic of Slovenia) PR Slovenia
- ŽKK Ljubljana
- Olimpija
(Socialist Republic of Bosnia and Herzegovina) PR Bosnia and Herzegovina
- Sloboda Tuzla

== Classification ==
	Season ranking 1960	Pt	G	W	D	L	PF	PA
1.	OKK Beograd	28	18	14	0	4	1565	1278
2.	Olimpija	26	18	13	0	5	1318	1151
3.	Zadar	20	18	9	2	7	1275	1256
4.	Partizan	19	18	9	1	8	1318	1324
5.	Željezničar Karlovac	17	18	8	1	9	1225	1263
6.	Crvena Zvezda	14	18	7	0	11	1275	1285
7.	Radnički Belgrade	14	18	7	0	11	1024	1110
8.	Sloboda Tuzla	14	18	7	0	11	1000	1128
9.	Proleter Zrenjanin	14	18	7	0	11	1160	1296
10.	Ljubljana	13 (-1)	18	7	0	11	1128	1197

The winning roster of OKK Beograd:

- (Socialist Federal Republic of Yugoslavia) Miodrag Nikolić
- (Socialist Federal Republic of Yugoslavia) Slobodan Gordić
- (Socialist Federal Republic of Yugoslavia) Radivoj Korać
- (Socialist Federal Republic of Yugoslavia) Dušan Gajin
- (Socialist Federal Republic of Yugoslavia) Trajko Rajković
- (Socialist Federal Republic of Yugoslavia) Slobodan Miloradović
- (Socialist Federal Republic of Yugoslavia) Ljubomir Lucić
- (Socialist Federal Republic of Yugoslavia) Frane Bosiočić
- (Socialist Federal Republic of Yugoslavia) Bogomir Rajković
- (Socialist Federal Republic of Yugoslavia) Bruno Pavelić
- (Socialist Federal Republic of Yugoslavia) Dragutin Tošić
- (Socialist Federal Republic of Yugoslavia) Milorad Erkić
- (Socialist Federal Republic of Yugoslavia) Branko Kosović
- (Socialist Federal Republic of Yugoslavia) Vojislav Jovanović
- (Socialist Federal Republic of Yugoslavia) Marko Marković

Coach: (Socialist Federal Republic of Yugoslavia) Borislav Stanković

== Scoring leaders ==
1. Radivoj Korać (OKK Beograd) – ___ points (37.0 ppg)
2. ???
3. ???

== Qualification in 1960-61 season European competitions ==
FIBA European Champions Cup

- OKK Beograd (champions)
