= 1964 Yugoslav First Basketball League =

- League: Yugoslav First Basketball League
- Sport: Basketball

1964
- Season champions: (Socialist Republic of Serbia) OKK Beograd

Yugoslav First Basketball League seasons
- ← 1963 1965 →

The 1964 Yugoslav First Basketball League season was the 20th season of the Yugoslav First Basketball League.

== Teams ==
(Socialist Republic of Croatia) SR Croatia
- Lokomotiva
- Split
- Zadar
- Željezničar Karlovac
(Socialist Republic of Serbia) SR Serbia
- Crvena Zvezda
- OKK Beograd
- Partizan
- Radnički Belgrade
(Socialist Republic of Slovenia) SR Slovenia
- Olimpija
- Slovan

== Classification ==
	Regular season ranking 1964	Pt	G	V	P	PF	PS
1.	OKK Beograd	30	18	15	3	1520	1320
2.	Zadar	24	18	12	6	1362	1286
3.	Crvena Zvezda	24	18	12	6	1387	1335
4.	Olimpija	22	18	11	7	1512	1365
5.	Željezničar Karlovac	22	18	11	7	1261	1175
6.	Lokomotiva	18	18	9	9	1361	1347
7.	Partizan	16	18	8	10	1352	1382
8.	Radnički Belgrade	14	18	7	11	1215	1359
9.	Split	10	18	5	13	1090	1214
10.	Slovan	0	18	0	18	1219	1496

The winning roster of OKK Beograd:

- (Socialist Federal Republic of Yugoslavia) Radivoj Korać
- (Socialist Federal Republic of Yugoslavia) Trajko Rajković
- (Socialist Federal Republic of Yugoslavia) Slobodan Gordić
- (Socialist Federal Republic of Yugoslavia) Dragutin Tošić
- (Socialist Federal Republic of Yugoslavia) Bruno Pavelić
- (Socialist Federal Republic of Yugoslavia) Milorad Erkić
- (Socialist Federal Republic of Yugoslavia) Miodrag Nikolić
- (Socialist Federal Republic of Yugoslavia) Zoran Bojković
- (Socialist Federal Republic of Yugoslavia) Božidar Milojković
- (Socialist Federal Republic of Yugoslavia) Ljubomir Stanković
- (Socialist Federal Republic of Yugoslavia) Momčilo Pazman

Coach: (Socialist Federal Republic of Yugoslavia) Borislav Stanković

== Results ==
Home \ Away	OKK	ZAD	CZV	OLI	ŽKA	LOK	PAR	RAD	SPL	SLV
OKK Beograd	—	81–77				67–63				
Zadar		—			59–52				72–64	
Crvena Zvezda			—		69–67			76–55		
Olimpija	113–124			—						79–64
Željezničar Karlovac					—		71–65			
Lokomotiva			76–74			—			50–55	
Partizan							—	64–56		78–63
Radnički Belgrade					66–54			—		
Split				47–68			63–65	50–76	—	
Slovan		73–78								—

Source: Partizanopedia.rs
Legend: Blue = home team win; Red = away team win.
Matches with lighter background shading were decided after overtime.

== Scoring leaders ==
1. Radivoj Korać (OKK Beograd) – 475 points (33.9 ppg)

== Qualification in 1964-65 season European competitions ==
FIBA European Champions Cup

- OKK Beograd (champions)
