= 1963 Yugoslav First Basketball League =

- League: Yugoslav First Basketball League
- Sport: Basketball

1963
- Season champions: (Socialist Republic of Serbia) OKK Beograd

Yugoslav First Basketball League seasons
- ← 1962 1964 →

The 1963 Yugoslav First Basketball League season was the 19th season of the Yugoslav First Basketball League. The season ended with OKK Beograd winning the league championship, ahead of KK Partizan.

The season began during June 1963 following the end of the 1963 FIBA World Championship in Brazil where the Yugoslav national team won silver, its first-ever medal at the FIBA World Championship. The national team success led to an increased level of interest in basketball throughout the country as the public eagerly awaited another showdown between the main title contenders — OKK Beograd led by twenty-four-year-old power forward Radivoj Korać and KK Olimpija whose on-court leader was twenty-five-year-old point guard Ivo Daneu.

== Notable events ==
=== Early games ===
The season opened at the outdoor court in Zadar in front of packed stands with 3,500 spectators as the home team, KK Zadar, took on visitors Lokomotiva Zagreb and won 88-78 behind Željko Troskot's 30 points who thus managed to overshadow the Yugoslav national team members on the floor — his Zadar teammate Pino Djerdja as well as Lokomotiva's Džimi Petričević (29 points) and Dragan Kovačić (19 points).

KK Zadar continued the early part of the season in furious fashion, beating KK Partizan away in Belgrade followed by facing defending champion KK Olimpija away in front of 4,000 fans in Ljubljana — Olimpija (without their injured best player Ivo Daneu) led 51-37 at the half behind Matija Dermastija's scoring before Zadar managed a complete comeback in the second half for a 97-100 final with Djerdja recording 37 points while Dermastija ended up with 29 points.

In contrast to Zadar's red hot early form, defending champion Olimpija performed way below expectations due to Daneu's injury absence, recording three losses in their first four games of the season. Olimpija's early-season losses included a 99-90 defeat away at KK Partizan whose sharpshooter Miloš Bojović scored 35 points while Bata Radović added 12.

== Teams ==
(Socialist Republic of Serbia) SR Serbia
- Crvena Zvezda
- OKK Beograd
- Partizan
- Proleter Zrenjanin
- Radnički Belgrade
- Zastava Kragujevac
(Socialist Republic of Croatia) SR Croatia
- Lokomotiva
- Zadar
- Željezničar Karlovac
(Socialist Republic of Slovenia) SR Slovenia
- Olimpija

== Classification ==
	Regular season ranking 1963	Pt	G	V	P	PF	PS
1.	OKK Beograd	30	18	15	3	1715	1320
2.	Partizan	24	18	12	6	1710	1474
3.	Olimpija	24	18	12	6	1777	1555
4.	Željezničar Karlovac	24	18	12	6	1562	1372
5.	Zadar	24	18	12	6	1745	1586
6.	Lokomotiva	18	18	9	9	1529	1417
7.	Radnički Belgrade	16	18	8	10	1502	1438
8.	Crvena Zvezda	16	18	8	10	1622	1690
9.	Zastava Kragujevac	2	18	1	17	1097	1689
10.	Proleter Zrenjanin	2	18	1	17	1304	2022

The winning roster of OKK Beograd:

- (Socialist Federal Republic of Yugoslavia) Radivoj Korać
- (Socialist Federal Republic of Yugoslavia) Milorad Erkić
- (Socialist Federal Republic of Yugoslavia) Slobodan Gordić
- (Socialist Federal Republic of Yugoslavia) Miodrag Nikolić
- (Socialist Federal Republic of Yugoslavia) Trajko Rajković
- (Socialist Federal Republic of Yugoslavia) Dragutin Tošić
- (Socialist Federal Republic of Yugoslavia) Bruno Pavelić
- (Socialist Federal Republic of Yugoslavia) Ljubomir Stanković
- (Socialist Federal Republic of Yugoslavia) Momčilo Pazman
- (Socialist Federal Republic of Yugoslavia) Branko Kosović
- (Socialist Federal Republic of Yugoslavia) Miodrag Ivačković
- (Socialist Federal Republic of Yugoslavia) Dušan Gajin
- (Socialist Federal Republic of Yugoslavia) Siniša Duboka
- (Socialist Federal Republic of Yugoslavia) Slobodan Miloradović

Coach: (Socialist Federal Republic of Yugoslavia) Aleksandar Nikolić

== Scoring leaders ==
1. Radivoj Korać (OKK Beograd) – 621 points (34.5 ppg)
2. ???
3. ???

== Qualification in 1963-64 season European competitions ==
FIBA European Champions Cup

- OKK Beograd (champions)
