= Radmilo Mišović =

Serbian basketball player

Personal information
- Born: 14 March 1943 (age 83) Čačak, German-occupied Serbia
- Listed height: 1.80 m (5 ft 11 in)

Career information
- NBA draft: 1965: undrafted
- Playing career: 1958–1980
- Position: Guard
- Number: 11
- Coaching career: 1967–1969

Career history

Playing
- 1958–1978: Borac Čačak
- 1978–1980: Železničar Čačak

Coaching
- 1967: Borac Čačak (youth)
- 1969: Borac Čačak
Medals
Men's basketball
Representing Yugoslavia
Balkan Basketball Championship
| Gold medal – first place | 1966 Sofia | Team |

Radmilo Mišović (Serbian Cyrillic: Радмило Мишовић; born 14 March 1943), is a Serbian former professional basketball executive, player and coach.

== Playing career ==
A guard, Mišović spent entire playing career with his hometown teams Borac and Železničar, playing from 1958 to 1980. He is the all-time leader in points scored of the Yugoslav League, scoring 7,456 points over 280 games played. Also, he is a five-time scoring champion, winning the Yugoslav scoring title during the 1967–68, 1968–69, 1970–71, 1971–72, and 1973–74 seasons.

== National team career ==
In 1966, Mišović was a member of the Yugoslavia national team that won a gold medal at the Balkan Basketball Championship in Sofia, Bulgaria.

== Coaching career ==
Mišović was the head coach of the Borac Čačak youth system in 1967, as well as of the senior team in 1969 (player-coach). In 1969, Borac Čačak competed in the Serbian League, South Division.

== Post-playing career ==
Between 1969 and 2010, Mišović worked as an executive and administrator for KK Borac Čačak, holding numerous positions through the time, such as a director or club's president.

As a member of the Party of Serbian Unity, Mišović won a seat in the National Assembly of Serbia at the 2000 Serbian parliamentary election. After the 2003 election, he retired from politics. Serbia was a part of FR Yugoslavia during that period.

== Awards ==
- Order of Labour with Silver Wreath
- City of Čačak October Award (1973)
- Best Sportsperson of Čačak in the 20th century
- City of Čačak December Award (2008)
- May Award for Lifetime Achievement (2018)

== See also ==
- Yugoslav First Federal Basketball League career stats leaders
- List of Yugoslav First Federal Basketball League annual scoring leaders
