= OSD Beograd =

Sports society in Belgrade, Serbia

- Founded: 1945
- Based in: Belgrade

Omladinsko sportsko društvo Beograd (Serbian Cyrillic: Омладинско спортско друштво Београд, lit. 'Youth sports association Belgrade'), commonly abbreviated as OSD Beograd (Serbian Cyrillic: ОСД Београд), is a multi-sports club from Belgrade, Serbia. Founded in 1945, it's an umbrella organization featuring teams in several sports.

== Active teams ==
- OFK Beograd - Omladinski fudbalski klub
- OKK Beograd - Omladinski košarkaški klub
- ORK Beograd - Omladinski rukometni klub
- OAK Beograd - Omladinski atletski klub
- OBK Beograd - Omladinski biciklistički klub
- OŠK Beograd - Omladinski šahovski klub
- OJK Beograd - Omladinski džudo klub
- OTK Beograd - Omladinski teniski klub

=== Defunct clubs ===
- OHK Beograd - Omladinski hokejaški klub

== History ==
It was founded on March 25, 1945 as Sportski Klub Metalac, in the summer of 1950 the name changed to Beogradsko sportsko društvo. In the winter of 1957 it changed to Omladinsko sportsko društvo Beograd.
