= Vladimir Jokanović =

Serbian basketball player and coach

AS Basket Belgrade
- Title: Head coach
- League: Second Regional League of Serbia

Personal information
- Born: 4 October 1961 (age 65) Zrenjanin, Serbia, Yugoslavia
- Listed height: 1.92 m (6 ft 4 in)

Career information
- NBA draft: 1983: undrafted
- Playing career: 1979–1998
- Position: Guard
- Number: 9, 10
- Coaching career: 1998–present

Career history

Playing
- 1979–1982: KK Put
- 1982–1992: OKK Beograd
- 1992–1993: Borovica
- 1993–1994: Beobanka
- 1994–1995: Beovuk
- 1995–1996: Winner Broker Niš
- 1996–1997: Beovuk
- 1997–1998: Beopetrol

Coaching
- 1998–1999: OKK Beograd (youth)
- 1999–2001: OKK Beograd
- 2001–2003: Kotež
- 2003–2005: Prokupac
- 2005–2006: Dinamo București
- 2008: Kotež
- 2009–present: AS Basket Belgrade

Vladimir Jokanović (Serbian Cyrillic: Срђан Јековић, born 4 October 1961) is a Serbian professional basketball coach and former player who is the head coach for AS Basket Belgrade of the 4th-tier Second Regional League of Serbia.

== Playing career ==
During his playing days as a guard, Jokanović played for domestic clubs KK Put, OKK Beograd, Borovica, Beobanka, Beovuk, Wiener Broker Niš, and Beopetrol. Most of his playing career he spent with OKK Beograd. Over 220 season games in ten seasons, he scored 1.840 points. Jokanović retired as a player with Beopetrol in 1998.

== Coaching career ==
After retirement in 1998, Jokanović returned to OKK Beograd as a coach of their youth system. In 1999, he became the head coach of the senior team. Two years later, he was hired as the head coach of Kotež. Thereafter, he coached Prokupac and the Romanian club Dinamo București.

In 2009, Jokanović was hired as the head coach of AS Basket Belgrade.
