= Marko Savić =

Marko Savić may refer to:

- Marko Savić (pianist) (1941–2013), Serbian pianist and university professor
- Marko Savić (footballer) (born 1984), Serbian footballer
- Marko Savić (water polo) (born 1981), German water polo player
- Marko Savić (basketball) (born 1988), Serbian basketball player
