= Rajčić =

Rajčić is a South Slavic surname.

Notable people with the name include:

- Aleksandra Rajčić (born 1996), Serbian artistic gymnast
- Ivan Rajčić (born 1981), Croatian association football player
- Marijana Rajcic (born 1989), Australian association football player
- Marina Rajčić (born 1993), Montenegrin handball goalkeeper
- Max Rajcic (born 2001), American baseball pitcher

== See also ==
- Rajčići
