= Zdravko Rajačić =

Serbian basketball coach

Personal information
- Born: 29 May 1952 Belgrade, PR Serbia, Yugoslavia
- Died: 3 October 2008 (aged 56) Belgrade, Serbia
- Coaching career: 1973–1989

Career history

Coaching
- 1973–1986: OKK Beograd (youth)
- 1986–1987: OKK Beograd (assistant)
- 1987–1989: OKK Beograd

Zdravko Rajačić (Serbian Cyrillic: Здравко Рајачић; 29 May 1952 – 3 October 2008) was a Serbian professional basketball coach who coached OKK Beograd during the 1980s.
