= Srđan Jeković =

Serbian basketball player and coach

Personal information
- Born: 17 October 1967 (age 59) Čačak, Serbia, Yugoslavia

Career information
- NBA draft: 1989: undrafted
- Playing career: 1982–2003
- Coaching career: 2003–present

Career history

Playing
- 1982–1988: Železničar Čačak
- 1988–1989: Borac Čačak
- 1990–1991: Kolubara
- 1991–1994: Železničar Čačak
- 1994–1995: Kolubara
- 1995–1999: Beopetrol
- 1999–2000: AZS UMK Toruń
- 2000–2001: Beopetrol
- 2001–2002: S.C. Lusitânia
- 2002–2003: Prokupac

Coaching
- 2003–2007: AS Basket Belgrade
- 2007–2009: Kolubara LA 2003
- 2009–2010: Crvena zvezda (assistant)
- 2011–2012: Mega Vizura (youth)
- 2012–2013: OKK Beograd
- 2014–2015: Novi Beograd 7
- 2015–2016: Kolubara LA 2003
- 2016–2017: BASK
- 2022-2023: Planet Basket (youth)

Srđan Jeković (Serbian Cyrillic: Срђан Јековић, born 17 October 1967) is a Serbian professional basketball coach and former player.

== Playing career ==
During his playing days, Jeković played for his hometown clubs Železničar and Borac, as well as Kolubara, Beopetrol, AZS UMK Toruń (Poland), S.C. Lusitânia (Portugal), and Prokupac. He retired as a player with Prokupac in 2003.

== Coaching career ==
After retirement in 2003, Jeković was as a coach of the Belgrade-based club AS Basket. In 2007, he became the head coach of Kolubara LA 2003. Two years later, he was added as an assistant coach of Aleksandar Trifunović to the Crvena zvezda coaching staff. Thereafter, he coached U19 Mega Vizura, Novi Beograd 7, and BASK. He had the second stint with Kolubara during the 2015–2016 season.

== Career achievements ==
As coach

- First Regional League of Serbia champion: 1 (with Kolubara LA 2003: 2015–16)
- Second Regional League of Serbia champion: 1 (with Kolubara LA 2003: 2007–08)

== Personal life ==
His son Bratislav (born 1996) is a professional basketball player who played for FMP, Mladost Zemun, Tamiš, and Dunav. His daughter Ana (born 1997) is a professional volleyball player who played for Vizura, and Crvena Zvezda.
