= OKK Beograd =

Basketball club in Belgrade, Serbia

- Nickname: Klonferi
- Leagues: Basketball League of Serbia
- Founded: 25 February 1945; 81 years ago
- History: KK Metalac (1945–1950); KK BSK (1950–1958); OKK Beograd (1958–present)
- Arena: Mega Factory
- Capacity: 700
- Location: Belgrade, Serbia
- Team colors: Blue, White
- President: Aleksa Milošević
- Head coach: Milan Vidosavljević
- Affiliation: Mega Basket
- Championships: 4 Yugoslav Leagues; 3 Yugoslav Cups
- Website: okkbeograd.org.rs
Home	Away

Omladinski košarkaški klub Beograd (Serbian Cyrillic: Омладински кошаркашки клуб Београд), commonly referred to as OKK Beograd, is a men's professional basketball club based in Belgrade, Serbia. They are currently competing in the Basketball League of Serbia. It is part of the multi-sports Belgrade-based sport club OSD Beograd. The club is the league affiliate of Mega Basket.

The club was founded in 1945 as KK Metalac. In 1950, the club changed its name to KK BSK, and then in 1958 to OKK Beograd, which it keeps to this day. The OKK Beograd squads have won 4 National League championships. They have played three different National League since 1945, including the Yugoslav First Federal League (1945–1992), the First League of Serbia and Montenegro (1992–2006), and the Serbian League (2006 onward). They have also won 3 National Cup titles.

The club has its own Hall of Fame. The members are Radivoj Korać, Slobodan Gordić, Bogomir Rajković, Trajko Rajković, Miodrag Nikolić, Milorad Erkić, and Borislav Stanković. Several members of the club have been inducted into the FIBA Hall of Fame, including player Korać, coach Aleksandar Nikolić and contributors Radomir Šaper and Stanković. Stanković and Korać are members of the Basketball Hall of Fame.

== History ==
OKK Beograd made most of its achievements during a so-called 'golden era' - a period between 1957 and 1965. The key players of this generation were Radivoj Korać, Slobodan Gordić, Bogomir Rajković, Trajko Rajković, Miodrag Nikolić and Milorad Erkić who would later be the coach of the women's squad, and longtime coordinator of the OKK youth program. They developed under the guidance of coaches Borislav Stanković and Aleksandar Nikolić and team director Radomir Šaper, and went on to win six national trophies and achieve high results in European competitions. In less than a decade, OKK Beograd won four Yugoslav League championships; in 1958, 1960, 1963 and 1964, accompanied by two Yugoslav Cups in 1960 and 1962. The club also reached the semifinals of a European Champions Cup on three occasions, but failed to reach the finals, losing to Academic Sofia in 1959, Spartak Brno in 1964 and Real Madrid in 1965. After 1965, the core of the team went abroad and the results dropped. However, the club did reach the finals of the first-ever Korać Cup in 1972 but lost to another Yugoslav club, Cibona (known at the time as Lokomotiva). Although OKK Beograd remained among the top Serbian and Yugoslav teams, the next trophy was not won until 1993, with the victory in the Yugoslav Cup.

On June 14, 2018, the club signed a contract on sports and technical cooperation with Adriatic League team Mega Basket.

== Sponsorship naming ==
The club has had several denominations through the years due to its sponsorship:

- Beko Beograd: 1974–1979
- InvestEksport Beograd: 1993–1994

== Logos ==
1945–1950

1950–1958

1958–present

Alternate logo

== Home arenas ==
- Šumice Hall
- Radivoj Korać Hall (2016–present)
- Mega Factory Hall (2018–present)

== Players ==
=== Current roster ===
Note: Flags indicate national team eligibility at FIBA-sanctioned events. Players may hold other non-FIBA nationalities not displayed.

OKK Beograd roster
Players
Coaches

Pos.	No.	Nat.	Name	Ht.	Age
PF	3	(Serbia)	Ðurić, Andrija	2.07 m (6 ft 9 in)	20 – 31 August 2006
PG	4	(Serbia)	Ivanović, Luka	1.90 m (6 ft 3 in)	18 – 4 December 2007
G/F	6	(Serbia)	Lilić, Đorđe	2.00 m (6 ft 7 in)	18 – 22 September 2008
SG	7	(Serbia)	Danilović, Vuk	1.97 m (6 ft 6 in)	18 – 2 January 2008
G/F	8	(Serbia)	Savić, Marko	1.94 m (6 ft 4 in)	18 – 1 September 2008
F	13	(Serbia)	Karalić, Nikola	2.02 m (6 ft 8 in)	18 – 20 September 2008
G/F	18	(Serbia)	Goljović, Aleksandar	1.98 m (6 ft 6 in)	19 – 2 August 2007
PG	20	(Bosnia and Herzegovina)	Teletović, Benjamin	1.97 m (6 ft 6 in)	18 – 20 July 2008
PF	21	(Serbia)	Gnjato, Đorđe	2.04 m (6 ft 8 in)	18 – 1 April 2008
SG	23	(Germany)	Marković, Viktor	1.94 m (6 ft 4 in)	16 – 11 September 2010
C	34	(Finland)	Pavlović, Andrej	2.15 m (7 ft 1 in)	18 – 4 June 2008
PF	35	(Serbia)	Vilotić, Aleksandar	2.05 m (6 ft 9 in)	17 – 25 January 2009
F/C	44	(Montenegro)	Đaletić, Andrija	2.05 m (6 ft 9 in)	19 – 22 April 2007
C	52	(Russia)	Glushonkov, Dmitriy	2.15 m (7 ft 1 in)	18 – 27 November 2007

Head coach

- (Serbia) Milan Vidosavljević

Assistant coach(es)

- (Serbia) Veselin Petrović

Legend

- (C) Team captain
- (L) On loan
- (TW) Two-way affiliate player
- Injured

- Roster
Updated: October 1, 2026

=== Depth chart ===
Pos.	Starting 5	Bench 1	Bench 2
C	Andrija Đaletić	Andrej Pavlović	Dmitriy Glushonkov
PF	Andrija Ðurić	Đorđe Gnjato	Aleksandar Vilotić
SF	Nikola Karalić	Marko Savić
SG	Aleksandar Goljović	Vuk Danilović	Đorđe Lilić
PG	Benjamin Teletović	Luka Ivanović	Viktor Marković

== Head coaches ==
- (Socialist Federal Republic of Yugoslavia) Mioljub Denić (1946–1948)
- (Socialist Federal Republic of Yugoslavia) Radomir Putnik (1949)
- (Socialist Federal Republic of Yugoslavia) Mihajlo Krnić (1950–1951)
- (Socialist Federal Republic of Yugoslavia) Aleksandar Nikolić (1952)
- (Socialist Federal Republic of Yugoslavia) Strahinja Alagić (1953)
- (Socialist Federal Republic of Yugoslavia) Borislav Stanković (1954–1961)
- (Socialist Federal Republic of Yugoslavia) Aleksandar Nikolić (1962–1963)
- (Socialist Federal Republic of Yugoslavia) Borislav Stanković (1964–1965)
- (Socialist Federal Republic of Yugoslavia) Slobodan Ivković (1966–1967)
- (Socialist Federal Republic of Yugoslavia) Todor Lazić (1967–1968)
- (Socialist Federal Republic of Yugoslavia) Borivoje Cenić (1968–1969)
- (Socialist Federal Republic of Yugoslavia) Borislav Stanković (1969–1970)
- (Socialist Federal Republic of Yugoslavia) Borivoje Cenić (1970–1971)
- (Socialist Federal Republic of Yugoslavia) Branislav Rajačić (1971)
- (Socialist Federal Republic of Yugoslavia) Borivoje Cenić (1971–1972)
- (Socialist Federal Republic of Yugoslavia) Todor Lazić (1972–1975)
- (Socialist Federal Republic of Yugoslavia) Branislav Rajačić (1975–1979)
- (Socialist Federal Republic of Yugoslavia) Slobodan Ivković (1979–1980)
- (Socialist Federal Republic of Yugoslavia) Branislav Rajačić (1980)
- (Socialist Federal Republic of Yugoslavia) Slobodan Ivković (1980–1981)
- (Socialist Federal Republic of Yugoslavia) Petar Marković (1981)
- (Socialist Federal Republic of Yugoslavia) Slobodan Ivković (1981–1982)
- (Socialist Federal Republic of Yugoslavia) Duško Vujošević (1982–1983)
- (Socialist Federal Republic of Yugoslavia) Vojislav Vezović (1983–1984)
- (Socialist Federal Republic of Yugoslavia) Dragoljub Pljakić (1984–1986)
- (Socialist Federal Republic of Yugoslavia) Životije Ranković (1986–1987)
- (Socialist Federal Republic of Yugoslavia) Zdravko Rajačić (1987–1989)
- (Socialist Federal Republic of Yugoslavia) Veselin Matić (1989–1990)
- (Socialist Federal Republic of Yugoslavia) Marijan Novović (1990–1991)
- (Socialist Federal Republic of Yugoslavia) Gordan Todorović (1991–1992)
- (Socialist Federal Republic of Yugoslavia) Vojislav Vezović (1992)
- (Serbia and Montenegro) Rajko Žižić (1992–1994)
- (Serbia and Montenegro) Gordan Todorović (1994)
- (Serbia and Montenegro) Igor Kokoškov (1994–1995)
- (Serbia and Montenegro) Ivan Jeremić (1995)
- (Serbia and Montenegro) Zoran Prelević (1995–1996)
- (Serbia and Montenegro) Slobodan Nikolić (1996–1999)
- (Serbia and Montenegro) Vladimir Jokanović (1999–2001)
- (Serbia and Montenegro) Predrag Jaćimović (2001–2002)
- (Serbia and Montenegro) Nenad Vučinić (2002–2003)
- (Serbia and Montenegro) Jovica Antonić (2003)
- (Serbia and Montenegro) Luka Pavićević (2003–2004)
- (Serbia and Montenegro) Dejan Mijatović (2004–2006)
- (Serbia) Slobodan Nikolić (2006–2007)
- (Serbia) Marko Ičelić (2007–2011)
- (Serbia) Vlade Đurović (2011–2012)
- (Serbia) Srđan Jeković (2012–2013)
- (Serbia) Vlade Đurović (2013)
- (Serbia) Milovan Stepandić (2013–2015)
- (Serbia) Vlade Đurović (2015–2016)
- (Greece) Darko Kostić (2016–2018)
- (Serbia) Branislav Vićentić (2018–2019)
- (Serbia) Branko Milisavljević (2019–2020)
- (Serbia) Branislav Ratkovica (2020–2021)
- (Montenegro) Vasilije Budimić (2021–2022)
- (Serbia) Vule Avdalović (2022–2025)
- (Serbia) Milan Vidosavljević (2025–present)

== Hall of Famers, greatest players and contributors ==
=== Naismith Memorial Basketball Hall of Fame ===
OKK Beograd Hall of Famers
Players
No.	Name	Position	Tenure	Inducted
5	Radivoj Korać	PF	1954–1967	2022
Coaches
Name		Position	Tenure	Inducted
Aleksandar Nikolić		Head coach	1961–1963; 1965–1967	1998
Contributors
Name		Position	Tenure	Inducted
Borislav Stanković		Head coach	1954–1961; 1964–1965; 1969–1970	1991

=== FIBA Hall of Fame ===
OKK Beograd Hall of Famers
Players
No.	Name	Position	Tenure	Inducted
5	Radivoj Korać	PF	1954–1967	2022
Coaches
Name		Position	Tenure	Inducted
Aleksandar Nikolić		Head coach	1961–1963; 1965–1967	2007
Contributors
Name		Position	Tenure	Inducted
Borislav Stanković		Head coach	1954–1961; 1964–1965; 1969–1970	2007
Radomir Šaper		Team director		2007

=== FIBA Order of Merit recipients ===
FIBA Order of Merit recipients
Order	Name	Tenure	Inducted
19	Aleksandar Nikolić	1951 as player 1961–1963, 1965–1967 as coach	1995
39	Radomir Šaper	team director	1999
65	Borislav Stanković	1954–1961, 1964–1965, 1969–1970 as coach	2015

=== FIBA's 50 Greatest Players ===
OKK Beograd Players
No.	Name	Position	Tenure	Inducted
5	Radivoj Korać	PF	1954–1967	1991

=== 50 Greatest EuroLeague Contributors ===
OKK Beograd EuroLeague Contributors
Players
No.	Name	Position	Tenure	Inducted
5	Radivoj Korać	PF	1954–1967	2008
Coaches
Name		Position	Tenure	Inducted
Aleksandar Nikolić		Head coach	1961–1963; 1965–1967	2008

== Season-by-season ==
Season	Tier	Division	Pos.	Postseason	W–L	National Cup	Regional competitions			European competitions
2006–07	1	BLS First League	12	—	6–16	—	—			—
2007–08	2	BLS B League	5	—	16–10	—	—			—
2008–09	2	BLS B League	2	—	21–5	—	—			—
2009–10	1	BLS First League	4	—	17–9	Quarterfinalist	Balkan League	QF	7–5	—
2010–11	1	BLS First League	2	SL 7th	23–17	Quarterfinalist	Balkan League	QF	5–5	—
2011–12	1	BLS First League	5	—	15–11	—	Balkan League	A5	2–8	—
2012–13	1	BLS First League	9	—	12–14	—	Balkan League	B5	2–6	—
2013–14	1	BLS First League	6	—	14–12	Quarterfinalist	—			—
2014–15	1	BLS First League	6	—	11–11	—	—			—
2015–16	1	BLS First League	12	—	9–17	—	—			—
2016–17	1	BLS First League	11	—	11–15	—	—			—
2017–18	1	BLS First League	12	—	9–17	—	—			—
2018–19	1	BLS First League	4	SL A-5th	19–17	—	—			—
2019–20	1	BLS First League	13	Abd	9–17	—	—			—
2020–21	1	BLS First League	10	—	12–18	—	—			—
2021–22	1	BLS First League	13	—	14–16	—	—			—
2022–23	1	BLS First League	5	SL A-2nd	22–14	—	—			—
2023–24	1	BLS First League	11	—	12–18	Quarterfinalist	—			—
2024–25	1	BLS First League	7	—	18–12	Semifinalist	—			—

== Trophies and awards ==
=== Trophies and successes ===
- Yugoslav League (defunct)
  - Winners (4): 1958, 1960, 1963, 1964
  - Runners-up (1): 1962
- Yugoslav Winter Championship
  - Winners (1): 1965
- Yugoslav Cup (defunct)
  - Winners (3): 1960, 1962, 1992–93
  - Runners-up (1): 1959
- Yugoslav Supercup
  - Runners-up (1): 1993
- FIBA European Champions Cup
  - Semi-finals (3): 1958-59, 1963-64, 1964-65
- FIBA Korać Cup (defunct)
  - Runners-up (1): 1972
  - TOP 16 (1): 1977-78

Other Minor trophies and Successes:

- Basketball League of Serbia (2nd tier)
  - Runners-up (1): 2010-11
- Developmental League of Serbia
  - Winners (1): 2012-13
- NR Serbia Cup (1st tier)
  - Winners (2): 1954, 1958
  - Runners-up (4): 1949, 1950, 1952, 1953

=== Awards ===
- BLS First League MVP
  - (Serbia) Andrija Bojić (1) – 2013–14
  - (Serbia) Vuk Malidžan (1) – 2014–15
- Yugoslav League Top Scorer
  - (Socialist Federal Republic of Yugoslavia) Radivoj Korać (7) – 1957, 1958, 1960, 1962, 1963, 1964, 1965

== Notable players ==
Note: Flags indicate national team eligibility at FIBA-sanctioned events. Players may hold other non-FIBA nationalities not displayed.

Criteria

To appear in this section a player must have either:

- Set a club record or won an individual award while at the club
- Played at least one official international match for their national team at any time
- Played at least one official NBA match at any time.

1940s

- (Socialist Federal Republic of Yugoslavia) Dragan Godžić

1950s

- (Socialist Federal Republic of Yugoslavia) Aleksandar Nikolić
- (Socialist Federal Republic of Yugoslavia) Milorad Erkić
- (Socialist Federal Republic of Yugoslavia) Bogomir Rajković

1960s

- (Socialist Federal Republic of Yugoslavia) Slobodan Gordić
- (Socialist Federal Republic of Yugoslavia) Radivoj Korać
- (Socialist Federal Republic of Yugoslavia) Miodrag Nikolić
- (Socialist Federal Republic of Yugoslavia) Trajko Rajković
- (Socialist Federal Republic of Yugoslavia) Miloš Bojović
- (Socialist Federal Republic of Yugoslavia) Zvonimir Petričević
- (Socialist Federal Republic of Yugoslavia) Zoran Marojević
- (Socialist Federal Republic of Yugoslavia) Bogdan Tanjević

1970s

- (Socialist Federal Republic of Yugoslavia) Žarko Knežević
- (Socialist Federal Republic of Yugoslavia) Rajko Žižić
- (Socialist Federal Republic of Yugoslavia) Branko Vukićević

1980s

- (Socialist Federal Republic of Yugoslavia) Danko Cvjetičanin
- (Socialist Federal Republic of Yugoslavia) Zoran Sretenović
- (Socialist Federal Republic of Yugoslavia) Dragan Todorić

1990s

- (Serbia and Montenegro) Zoran Jovanović
- (Serbia and Montenegro) Nebojša Zorkić
- (Serbia and Montenegro) Zoran Radović

2000s

- (New Zealand) Paul Henare
- (Serbia and Montenegro) Miloš Borisov
- (Serbia and Montenegro) Aleksandar Glintić
- (Serbia and Montenegro) Vladimir Micov

2010s

- (Bosnia and Herzegovina) Aleksej Nešović
- (Croatia) Karlo Matković
- (Jamaica) Kimani Ffriend
- (Serbia) Aleksa Avramović
- (Serbia) Andrija Bojić
- (Serbia) Vuk Malidžan

2020s

- (Serbia) Nikola Đurišić

== International record ==
Season	Achievement	Notes
FIBA European Champions Cup
1964–65	Semifinals	Eliminated by Real Madrid, 174–180 (1–1)
1963–64	Semifinals	Eliminated by Spartak ZJŠ Brno, 178–179 (1–1)
1958–59	Semifinals	Eliminated by Academic, 156–163 (1–1)
1960–61	Second round	Eliminated by Antwerpse, 47–68 (0–2)
FIBA Korać Cup
1972	Runners-up	Eliminated by Lokomotiva, 156–165 (1–1)
1977–78	Round of 16	2nd in Group C with Juventud Freixenet, Xerox Milano, and SSV Hagen (3–3)
