= Radomir Šaper =

Serbian basketball player

- Born: 9 December 1925; Belgrade, Kingdom of Serbs, Croats and Slovenes
- Died: 6 December 1998 (aged 72); Belgrade, FR Yugoslavia
- Education: University of Belgrade
- Occupations: Basketball player; basketball administrator; university professor; academic administrator
- Height: 1.78 m (5 ft 10 in)
- Spouse: Ljiljana Šaper
- Children: Srđan Šaper
- Basketball career

Career information
- Playing career: 1942–1953
- Position: Guard

Career history
- 1942: BASK
- 1945: Crvena zvezda
- 1946–1953: Partizan

Career highlights
- FIBA Order of Merit (1999); Piva Ivković Award for Lifetime Achievement (2008)
- FIBA Hall of Fame

Radomir “Raša” Šaper (Serbian Cyrillic: Радомир Шапер; 9 December 1925 – 6 December 1998), was a Serbian professor and Vice-Dean at the Faculty of Technology and Metallurgy of the University of Belgrade, a member of the Yugoslav national basketball team and, later, an official of the Basketball Federation of Yugoslavia and President of the Technical Commission of FIBA. He was awarded the FIBA Order of Merit in 1999, and was inducted into the FIBA Hall of Fame, in 2007.

== Life ==
Radomir Šaper was born to a Greek father, Panagiotis Siaperas - Panche Shapkar, a retailer from the village of Eratyra in northern Greece, and a Serbian mother, Vukosava Mihajlović. In 1919, after World War I, his father moved to Belgrade where he changed his name to Panta Šaper from Shapkar.Shapka meaning hat usually hat manufacturer was called Shapkar.The couple's first son Svetislav "Sveta" was born in early 1924, Radomir, some twenty months later in the family home in Stevan Sremac's Street in Belgrade.

Young Radomir attended the "Vuk Karadžić" primary school and the Second Men's Gymnasium in Belgrade, from which he graduated in 1944. In 1946, he enrolled in the Faculty of Technology and Metallurgy of the University of Belgrade, graduating in 1950. He earned his doctorate degree in 1964, became an associate professor in 1968, and a full professor at the Faculty four years later. In 1980, Professor Šaper was appointed Vice-Dean of the Faculty and worked there until his retirement in 1991.

While teaching at the Faculty of Technology and Metallurgy, Professor Šaper published more than 150 scientific and professional papers. He was the author or co-author of five books on analytical chemistry and automatic regulation of chemical processes.

== Basketball career ==
Šaper learned his first basketball moves at the Second Men's grammar school from his teacher, Đoka Ilić, and shared enthusiasm for basketball with his elder brother Sveta. They began playing basketball together with the BASK basketball club, which officially marked the beginning of Raša's basketball career.

The International Basketball Federation was formed in 1936, and four years later, on 20 November 1940, the Basketball Federation of Yugoslavia was established and became a member of FIBA, which had 36 members at the time. The Belgrade Championship was held in 1942, and the history of Yugoslavian basketball began, with Raša and Sveta Šaper defending the colours of BASK. At first, basketball was played in the House of King Alexander, then in Sokolana, but the sport of basketball did not truly come alive until early 1945. The generation of players that grew up during the war years welcomed the end of the war in the spring of 1945, and the first basketball court was laid out on the tennis courts at Mali Kalemegdan. It was at this time that Raša and his fellow players joined the newly formed Red Star basketball club.

Just four months after the war ended, the boys from Kalemegdan played in Subotica as the Serbian team in the first national championship. The team consisted of Raša and Sveta Šaper, Nebojša Popović, Vasilije Stojković, Pavle Kostić, Ivan Dimić, Miodrag Stefanović and Mile Nikolić. In the final game, the Yugoslav Army team defeated the Serbian team with 21-16.

The rivalry between the clubs intensified year after year in all sports, including basketball. Particularly interesting championships were held in 1950 and 1951 when Partizan and Red Star scored the same number of points, but Red Star won both titles thanks to a better points-difference. Radomir Šaper played for Partizan from 1946 until 1953. Bora Stanković, Vilmoš Loci, Lajoš Engler, Mirko Marjanović, Boža Munćan, and others played alongside him.

The Yugoslav national team played its first international game in Bucharest in 1946, losing to Romania. Their first victory came two days later against Albania. At the European Championships in Czechoslovakia in 1947, the team finished next to last, after which Frenchman Henri Hell became the Yugoslav national team coach. He invited Radomir Šaper to Opatija to prepare for the qualifying tournament in Nice, where Raša played his first game with the national team.

== Sports official ==
At the first World Basketball Championship in Buenos Aires in 1950, Yugoslavia finished last, without achieving a single victory. Three years later, at the European Championship in Moscow, Yugoslavia finished in sixth place. Following these results, Danilo Knežević, then President of the Basketball Federation of Yugoslavia, invited Radomir Šaper, Borislav Stanković, Nebojša Popović and Aleksandar Nikolić, all active athletes whose playing careers were in decline or completely over, to join his staff.

In mid-1958, the new management decided to apply to organise the twelfth European Championship, which was scheduled to take place in 1961. Nineteen teams signed up for the championship because at that time there were no qualifying games. They played from dawn to dusk for eight days. With phenomenal performances, Yugoslavia managed to reach the finals against the then-invincible team from the Soviet Union.

After an epic struggle, Yugoslavia was defeated, thus winning the silver medal. This first medal in the history of Yugoslav basketball was a result beyond expectations and created new opportunities to compete with the world’s best teams. Coach Aleksandar Popović led the winning team, and Korać won the title of Europe's best scorer with 216 points in nine games. This medal was followed by the rapid popularisation of basketball in the country; new clubs were sprouting up everywhere, and the number of players started to rise. Confirmation that a formula for success had been found came two years later in 1963 at the World Championship in Rio de Janeiro, where the team again won the silver medal, behind Brazil. In this Championship, they defeated both the USA (75-73) and the USSR (69-67). Later that year, at the European Championship in Wrocław, they won another medal – this time bronze.

In 1970, Yugoslavia was the host of the World Championship and beat the American team 70-63 in the final game, thus winning its first gold medal. Involved in this historical success of winning the country’s first world title were: Ratomir Tvrdić, Ljubodrag Simonović, Vinko Jelovac, Trajko Rajković, Aljoša Žorga, Dragan Kapičić, Ivo Daneu, Krešimir Ćosić, Damir Šolman, Nikola Plećaš, Dragutin Čermak, Petar Skansi, Ranko Žeravica, the coach, and the president of the Basketball Federation of Yugoslavia, Radomir Šaper.

At the Basketball Federation of Yugoslavia Conference, held in Skopje on 26 June 1970, Raša Šaper was once again elected president along with vice-presidents Željko Cindrić and Nebojša Popović. Bora Stanković was elected secretary-general and Boris Kristančić chosen as president of the Advisory Committee.

Šaper was the president of the Basketball Federation of Yugoslavia until 1973, when he was appointed secretary general. He was also the commissioner of the Yugoslav Basketball Cup and the creator and initiator of the YUBA League, a national championship organised and conceived to be the strongest tournament in the world after the American NBA.

At the Congress of the International Basketball Federation (FIBA) held on 24 August 1972, Radomir Šaper was elected president of its Technical Commission, a position in which he remained until his death in 1998. Together with Bora Stanković, he was a member of the Central Board. His contributions to the development and improvement of basketball in the world were invaluable, including introduction of new and innovative rules and improvement in the quality of refereeing.

On the occasion of 20th anniversary of Radomir Šaper's death a memorial tournament. This tournament used some of the innovative rules of basketball for which Radomir Šaper advocated during his life (mixed male women's teams, different scoring, duration of the match). Organizers of the tournament were Sport Center "Radivoj Korać" and basketball clubs OKK Beograd and ŽKK Radivoj Korać, while the cup bearing the name Radomir Šaper was awarded by his son Srđan Šaper.

The Basketball Foundation has published "How Yugoslav Basketball Emerged".

== See also ==
- Borislav Stanković
- Aleksandar Nikolić
- Nebojša Popović

== Sources ==
Kosanić Podunavac, Jelena; Milovanović, Bojan (2005). Radomir Šaper – How Yugoslav basketball emerged. Belgrade. ISBN 86-85861-02-0.

Sporting positions
Preceded by Danilo Knežević	President of the Basketball Federation of Yugoslavia; 1965–1973	Succeeded by Radoslav Savić
