= Dragutin Čermak =

Serbian basketball player and coach (1944–2021)

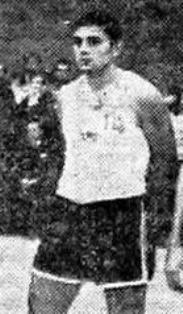
- Čermak with Yugoslavia at the 1968 Olympics in Mexico City

Personal information
- Born: 12 October 1944 Belgrade, German-occupied Serbia
- Died: 12 October 2021 (aged 77) Belgrade, Serbia
- Listed height: 1.90 m (6 ft 3 in)
- Listed weight: 98 kg (216 lb)

Career information
- Playing career: 1967–1980
- Position: Shooting guard
- Coaching career: 1980–2003

Career history

Playing
- 1967–1969: Radnički Beograd
- 1969–1973: Partizan
- 1973–1975: Nationale-Nederlanden Donar
- 1975–1976: Liège
- 1976–1980: Radnički Beograd

Coaching
- 1983–1984: Eczacıbaşı
- 2003: Algeria

Career highlights
- As player: FIBA European Selection (1970)
Medals
Men's basketball
Representing Yugoslavia
Summer Olympic Games
Silver medal – second place	1968 Mexico City
FIBA World Cup
Gold medal – first place	1970 Yugoslavia

Dragutin "Miško" Čermak (Serbian Cyrillic: Драгутин Мишко Чермак; 12 October 1944 – 12 October 2021) was a Serbian basketball player and coach.

== National team career ==
Čermak represented SFR Yugoslavia at the 1968 Summer Olympics and 1972 Summer Olympics.

== Coaching career ==
After finishing his playing career in 1980, Čermak had coaching stints in Algeria, Kuwait, United Arab Emirates, and Jordan among other places.

== Personal life ==
He is a son of Nedeljko Čermak, a well known businessman and president of Partizan Belgrade (1970–1972). Čermak married actress Vesna Malohodžić.

He died on 12 October 2021, his 77th birthday.
