= Aleksandar Nikolić =

Serbian basketball player and coach

Personal information
- Born: 28 October 1924 Sarajevo, Kingdom of Serbs, Croats and Slovenes
- Died: 12 March 2000 (aged 75) Belgrade, Serbia, FR Yugoslavia
- Listed height: 5 ft 8 in (1.73 m)

Career information
- Playing career: 1942–1952
- Position: Small forward
- Number: 4
- Coaching career: 1951–1985

Career history

Playing
- 1942: SK 1913
- 1945: Crvena zvezda
- 1945: Yugoslav Army
- 1946: Partizan
- 1946: Metalac Beograd
- 1947–1949: Crvena zvezda
- 1950: Železničar Čačak
- 1951–1952: BSK Beograd

Coaching
- 1950: Yugoslavia Women
- 1952: BSK Beograd (player–coach)
- 1954–1965: Yugoslavia
- 1959–1961: Partizan
- 1961–1963: OKK Beograd
- 1963–1965: Petrarca Padova
- 1969–1973: Varese
- 1973–1974: Crvena zvezda
- 1974–1976: Fortitudo Bologna
- 1977–1978: Yugoslavia
- 1978–1980: Borac Čačak
- 1981–1982: Virtus Bologna
- 1982–1983: Reyer Venezia
- 1983–1984: Victoria Libertas
- 1984–1985: Udinese
- 1991–1992: Partizan (consultant)

Career highlights
- As player: 4× Yugoslav League champion (1945, 1947–1949); As head coach: 2× FIBA Intercontinental Cup champion (1970, 1973); 3× FIBA European Champions Cup champion (1970, 1972, 1973); FIBA Cup Winners' Cup champion (1974); 3× Italian League champion (1970, 1972, 1973); 3× Italian Cup winner (1970, 1971, 1973); Yugoslav League champion (1963); Yugoslav Cup winner (1962); 50 Greatest EuroLeague Contributors (2008); 2× European Coach of the Year (1966, 1976); FIBA European Selection (1979); Piva Ivković Award for Lifetime Achievement (1995); FIBA Order of Merit (1995); As consultant: FIBA European League champion (1992); Yugoslav League champion (1992); Yugoslav Cup winner (1992)
- Basketball Hall of Fame
- FIBA Hall of Fame
Medals
Men's basketball
Representing Yugoslavia
Balkan and Central Europe Games
Silver medal – second place	1947 Albania	Team
Head Coach for Yugoslavia
FIBA World Cup
Gold medal – first place	1978 Philippines
Silver medal – second place	1963 Brazil
FIBA EuroBasket
Gold medal – first place	1977 Belgium
Silver medal – second place	1965 Soviet Union
Bronze medal – third place	1963 Poland
Silver medal – second place	1961 Yugoslavia
Mediterranean Games
Gold medal – first place	1959 Lebanon

Aleksandar "Aca" Nikolić (Serbian Cyrillic: Александар "Аца" Николић; 28 October 1924 – 12 March 2000) was a Serbian professional basketball player and coach. He was also a professor at the University of Belgrade's Faculty of Sport and Physical Education. He is often referred to as the Father of Yugoslav and Serbian Basketball.

Nikolić acted as a mentor to many young basketball coaches in Yugoslavia, some of whom—such as Božidar Maljković, Dušan Ivković, Bogdan Tanjević, and Željko Obradović—would go on to great professional success in their own right. Nicknamed the Professor and Iron Sergeant, Nikolić was inducted into the Basketball Hall of Fame as a coach in 1998, and into the FIBA Hall of Fame in 2007. In 2008, he was named one of the 50 Greatest EuroLeague Contributors.

== Early life ==
Though his parents lived in Brčko, Nikolić was born in Sarajevo, Kingdom of Serbs, Croats and Slovenes, due to his pregnant mother, Krista, suddenly going into labour while visiting her sister in Sarajevo. Young Aleksandar enjoyed a privileged upbringing courtesy of his wealthy father, Đorđe Nikolić, who had him at the age of 62. After spending the first few years of his life in Brčko, Nikolić moved with his family to the capital Belgrade, where he would grow up.

Nikolić attended the Kralj Aleksandar Gymnasium at the Belgrade neighbourhood of Banovo Brdo. He then studied medicine and law at the University of Belgrade, graduating in 1946.

== Playing career ==
A small forward, Nikolić played 7 seasons in the Yugoslavia Federal League, from 1945 to 1951. During his playing days, he played for the Yugoslav Army (1945), Partizan (1946), Crvena zvezda (1945, 1947–1949), Železničar Čačak and BSK Beograd (1951). He won the Yugoslav Championships in 1945 with the Yugoslav Army and in 1947, 1948, and 1949, with Crvena Zvezda. He retired as a player with BSK Beograd in 1951.

== National team playing career ==
Nikolić was a member of the Yugoslavia national basketball team during the late 1940s, making in 10 appearances.

== Coaching career ==
=== Club coaching career ===
After his playing career was over, Nikolić became involved with coaching, both with Serbia-based clubs, and those in Italy, notably Ignis Varese.

=== Yugoslavia national team ===
Nikolić was also the head coach of the senior Yugoslav national squad, between 1951 and 1965, and later between 1977 and 1978. During this time, he coached two future members of the FIBA Hall of Fame, in Borislav Stanković and Krešimir Ćosić. Under his leadership, Yugoslavia won the gold medals at the 1978 FIBA World Championship and the 1977 EuroBasket; silver medals at the 1963 FIBA World Championship, 1961 EuroBasket, and 1965 EuroBasket, and a bronze medal at the 1963 EuroBasket.

== Death ==
Nikolić died on 12 March 2000, in Belgrade. He is buried in the Alley of Distinguished Citizens at Belgrade's New Cemetery.

In February 2016, in Nikolić's honour, the name of the City of Belgrade-owned Hala Pionir was changed to the Aleksandar Nikolić Hall. Following the arena name change, Nikolić's daughter Dubravka Nikolić Rakočević wrote a letter to the Serbia Prime Minister Aleksandar Vučić, expressing gratitude on behalf of the late Nikolić's family.

== In popular culture ==
- In the 2015 Serbian sports drama, We Will Be the World Champions, Nikolić is portrayed by Marko Janketić.

== See also ==
- Aleksandar Nikolić Hall
- Radomir Šaper
- FIBA Basketball World Cup winning head coaches
- List of FIBA EuroBasket winning coaches
- List of EuroLeague-winning coaches
