= 1963 FIBA World Championship =

1963 edition of the FIBA World Championship

FIBA Campeonato Mundial de Basquetebol Masculino de 1963

Tournament details
- Host country: Brazil
- Dates: 12–25 May
- Officially opened by: João Goulart
- Teams: 13 (from 3 confederations)
- Venues: 5 (in 5 host cities)

Final positions
- Champions: Brazil (2nd title)
- Runners-up: Yugoslavia
- Third place: Soviet Union
- Fourth place: United States

Tournament statistics
- Games played: 54
- MVP: (Brazil) Wlamir Marques
- Top scorer: (Peru) Ricardo Duarte (23.1 points per game)

The 1963 FIBA World Championship was the 4th FIBA World Championship, the international basketball world championship for men's national teams. The competition was hosted by Brazil from 12 to 25 May 1963.

The Philippines was originally awarded the right to host the tournament, but FIBA rescinded this after the Filipino immigration officials refused to grant visas to players from communist countries.

Brazil, the defending champion and a previous host, re-hosted the championship from 12 to 25 May 1963, and won the first back-to-back title with just six games, having been seeded and entering the well-rested team in the final round only.

== Background ==
The Philippines was supposed to host the FIBA World Championship in 1962 but FIBA revoked hosting rights after the government of then President Diosdado Macapagal, refused to grant visas to players and officials of socialists countries including Yugoslavia and the Soviet Union. A smaller tournament, the Spalding Invitation Tournament was held in the Philippines in its place.

The FIBA World Championship was held in 1963 in Brazil.

== Competing nations ==
Event	Date	Location	Berths	Qualified
Original host nation			0	~~Philippines~~
1959 FIBA World Championship / host nation	16–31 January 1959	Chile	1	Brazil
1960 Summer Olympics	26 August–10 September 1960	(Italy) Rome	1	United States
EuroBasket 1961	29 April–8 May 1961	(Socialist Federal Republic of Yugoslavia) Beograd	3	Soviet Union; Yugoslavia; France
South American Basketball Championship 1961	20–30 April 1961	(Brazil) Rio de Janeiro	3	Peru; Uruguay; Argentina
Wild cards			5	Canada; Mexico; Puerto Rico; Italy; Japan

== Competition format ==
- Preliminary round: Three groups of four teams play each other once; top two teams progress to the final round, bottom two teams relegated to classification round.
- Classification round: All bottom two teams from preliminary round group play each other once. The team with the best record is ranked eighth; the worst is ranked 13th.
- Final round: All top two teams from preliminary round group, the 1960 Olympic champion, and the host team play each other once. The team with the best record wins the championship.

== Preliminary round ==
=== Group A ===
Pos	Team	Pld	W	L	PF	PA	PD	Pts	Qualification
1	Soviet Union	3	3	0	222	177	+45	6	Final round
2	France	3	2	1	200	181	+19	5	Final round
3	Uruguay	3	1	2	195	214	−19	4	Classification round
4	Canada	3	0	3	158	203	−45	3	Classification round

Source: FIBA archive
Rules for classification: 1) points; 2) head-to-head points; 3) head-to-head goal average; 4) head-to-head number of points scored.

12 May

France	64–54	Uruguay
Scoring by half: 19-25, 45-29

Belo Horizonte

12 May

Soviet Union	58–45	Canada
Scoring by half: 27-24, 31-21

Belo Horizonte

13 May

Canada	56–66	Uruguay
Scoring by half: 27-25, 29-41

Belo Horizonte

13 May

France	57–70	Soviet Union
Scoring by half: 30-28, 27-42

Belo Horizonte

14 May

Canada	57–79	France
Scoring by half: 25-28, 32-51

Belo Horizonte

14 May

Uruguay	75–94	Soviet Union
Scoring by half: 30-39, 45-55

Belo Horizonte

=== Group B ===
Pos	Team	Pld	W	L	PF	PA	PD	Pts	Qualification
1	Yugoslavia	3	3	0	262	208	+54	6	Final round
2	Puerto Rico	3	2	1	234	212	+22	5	Final round
3	Japan	3	1	2	198	231	−33	4	Classification round
4	Peru	3	0	3	181	224	−43	3	Classification round

Source: FIBA archive
Rules for classification: 1) points; 2) head-to-head points; 3) head-to-head goal average; 4) head-to-head number of points scored.

12 May

Yugoslavia	84–67	Peru
Scoring by half: 30-42, 54-25

Curitiba

12 May

Puerto Rico	86–65	Japan
Scoring by half: 33-33, 53-32

Curitiba

13 May

Puerto Rico	70–64	Peru
Scoring by half: 45-33, 25-31

Curitiba

13 May

Japan	63–95	Yugoslavia
Scoring by half: 24-37, 39-58

Curitiba

14 May

Peru	50–70	Japan
Scoring by half: 17-41, 33-29

Curitiba

14 May

Puerto Rico	78–83	Yugoslavia
Scoring by half: 35-42, 43-41

Curitiba

=== Group C ===
Pos	Team	Pld	W	L	PF	PA	PD	Pts	Qualification
1	United States	3	3	0	256	202	+54	6	Final round
2	Italy	3	2	1	258	242	+16	5	Final round
3	Mexico	3	1	2	240	260	−20	4	Classification round
4	Argentina	3	0	3	206	256	−50	3	Classification round

Source: FIBA archive
Rules for classification: 1) points; 2) head-to-head points; 3) head-to-head goal average; 4) head-to-head number of points scored.

12 May

United States	88–74	Mexico
Scoring by half: 41-42, 47-32

Ginásio do Ibirapuera, São Paulo

12 May

Italy	91–73	Argentina
Scoring by half: 42-34, 49-39

Ginásio do Ibirapuera, São Paulo

13 May

Mexico	82–90	Italy
Scoring by half: 44-36, 38-54

Ginásio do Ibirapuera, São Paulo

13 May

Argentina	51–81	United States
Scoring by half: 26-43, 25-38

Ginásio do Ibirapuera, São Paulo

14 May

Mexico	84–82	Argentina
Scoring by half: 42-53, 42-29

Ginásio do Ibirapuera, São Paulo

14 May

United States	87–77	Italy
Scoring by half: 42-34, 45-43

Ginásio do Ibirapuera, São Paulo

== Classification round ==
Pos	Team	Pld	W	L	PF	PA	PD	Pts
8	Argentina	5	4	1	449	414	+35	9
9	Mexico	5	3	2	389	364	+25	8 (Note: Head-to-head record: Mexico 1–1 (1.07 GAvg), Uruguay 1–1 (1.01 GAvg), Canada 1–1 (0.92 GAvg))
10	Uruguay	5	3	2	376	372	+4	8
11	Canada	5	3	2	365	375	−10	8
12	Peru	5	2	3	362	367	−5	7
13	Japan	5	0	5	377	426	−49	5

Source: FIBA archive
Rules for classification: 1) points; 2) head-to-head points; 3) head-to-head goal average; 4) head-to-head number of points scored.
Notes:

16 May

Argentina	88–86	Mexico
Scoring by half: 41-40, 47-46

Petrópolis

16 May

Peru	66–59 (OT)	Canada
Scoring by half: 32-24, 20-28 Overtime: 14-7

Petropolis

17 May

Japan	63–79	Uruguay
Scoring by half: 30-42, 33-37

Petropolis

17 May

Peru	57–72	Mexico
Scoring by half: 27-34, 30-38

Petropolis

18 May

Argentina	103–85	Japan
Scoring by half: 58-39, 45-46

Petropolis

18 May

Canada	73–71	Uruguay
Scoring by half: 34-30, 39-41

Petropolis

19 May

Peru	66–67	Uruguay
Scoring by half: 34-29, 32-38

Petropolis

20 May

Canada	82–77	Argentina
Scoring by half: 51-34, 31-43

Petropolis

20 May

Mexico	71–70	Japan
Scoring by half: 35-36, 36-34

Petropolis

21 May

Peru	95–85	Japan
Scoring by half: 53-46, 42-39

Petropolis

21 May

Argentina	97–83	Uruguay
Scoring by half: 46-45, 51-38

Petropolis

22 May

Peru	78–84 (OT)	Argentina
Scoring by half: 38-36, 37-39 Overtime: 3-9

Petropolis

22 May

Mexico	87–73	Canada
Scoring by half: 38-32, 49-41

Petropolis

23 May

Japan	74–78	Canada
Scoring by half: 41-42, 33-36

Petropolis

23 May

Uruguay	76–73	Mexico
Scoring by half: 42-33, 34-40

Petropolis

== Final round ==
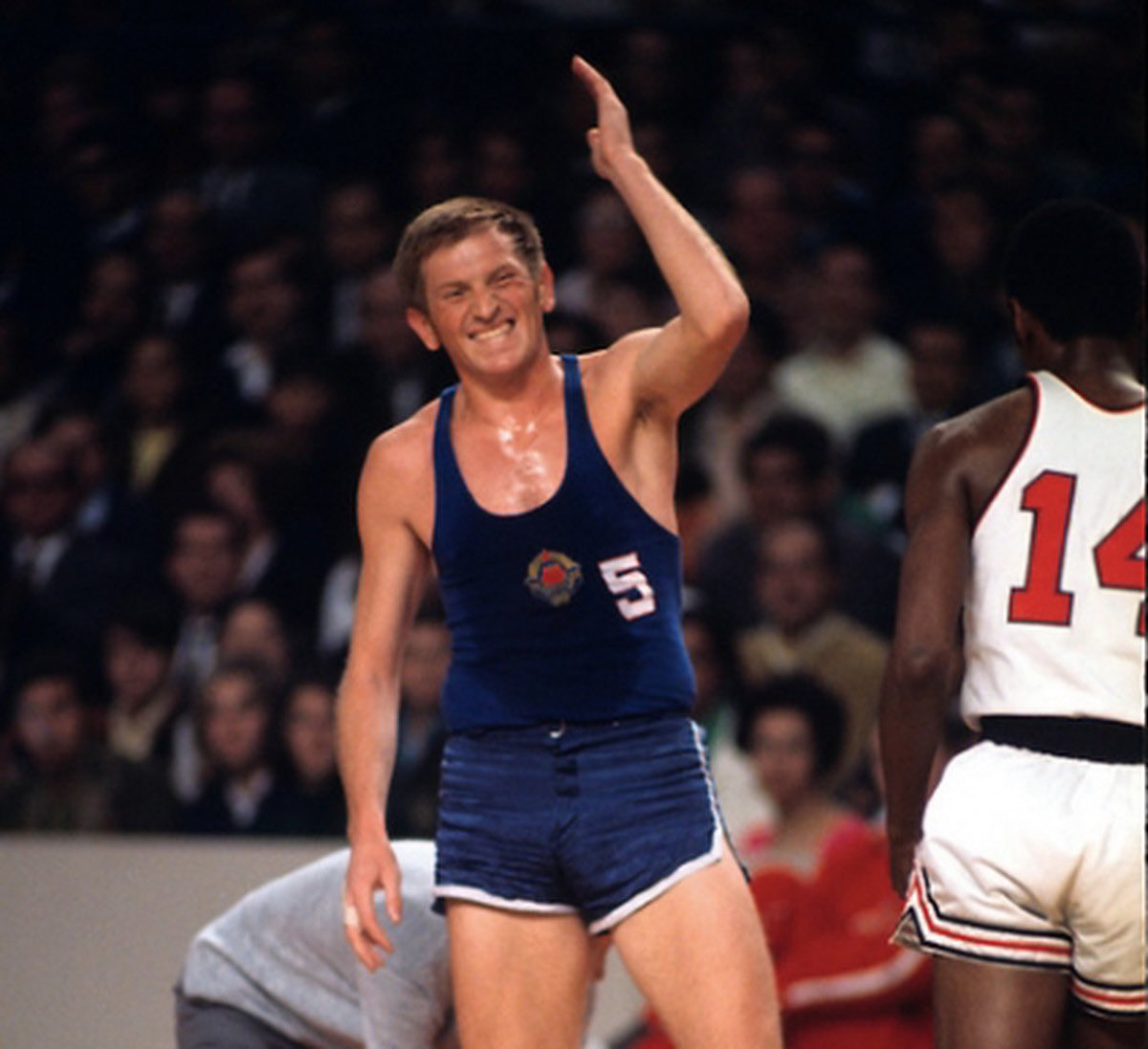
Yugoslavia's Radivoj Korać versus the USA's Ed Smallwood in the Final round. Yugoslavia won 75–73.

Pos	Team	Pld	W	L	PF	PA	PD	Pts
1	Brazil (C, H)	6	6	0	485	411	+74	12
2	Yugoslavia	6	5	1	472	424	+48	11
3	Soviet Union	6	4	2	426	399	+27	10
4	United States	6	3	3	498	433	+65	9
5	France	6	2	4	369	438	−69	8
6	Puerto Rico	6	1	5	366	426	−60	7
7	Italy	6	0	6	407	492	−85	6

Source: FIBA archive
Rules for classification: 1) points; 2) head-to-head points; 3) head-to-head goal average; 4) head-to-head number of points scored.
(C) Champions; (H) Hosts

16 May

Soviet Union	58–48	France
Scoring by half: 25-23, 33-25

Ginásio do Maracanãzinho, Rio de Janeiro

16 May

United States	73–75	Yugoslavia
Scoring by half: 32-30, 41-45

Ginásio do Maracanãzinho, Rio de Janeiro

16 May

Brazil	62–55	Puerto Rico
Scoring by half: 25-27, 37-28

Ginásio do Maracanãzinho, Rio de Janeiro

17 May

Yugoslavia	73–57	Puerto Rico
Scoring by half: 34-32, 39-25

Ginásio do Maracanãzinho, Rio de Janeiro

17 May

United States	81–61	France
Scoring by half: 36-35, 45-26

Ginásio do Maracanãzinho, Rio de Janeiro

17 May

Brazil	81–62	Italy
Scoring by half: 40-24, 41-38

Ginásio do Maracanãzinho, Rio de Janeiro

18 May

Puerto Rico	60–67	France
Scoring by half: 27-28, 33-39

Ginásio do Maracanãzinho, Rio de Janeiro

18 May

Yugoslavia	85–74	Italy
Scoring by half: 34-36, 51-38

Ginásio do Maracanãzinho, Rio de Janeiro

18 May

United States	74–75	Soviet Union
Scoring by half: 40-34, 34-41

Ginásio do Maracanãzinho, Rio de Janeiro

20 May

France	67–63	Italy
Scoring by half: 30-24, 37-39

Ginásio do Maracanãzinho, Rio de Janeiro

20 May

Yugoslavia	71–90	Brazil
Scoring by half: 27-51, 44-39

Ginásio do Maracanãzinho, Rio de Janeiro

21 May

Puerto Rico	55–64	Soviet Union
Scoring by half: 18-29, 37-35

Ginásio do Maracanãzinho, Rio de Janeiro

21 May

France	63–77	Brazil
Scoring by half: 31-38, 32-39

Ginásio do Maracanãzinho, Rio de Janeiro

22 May

Italy	63–83	Soviet Union
Scoring by half: 28-48, 35-35

Ginásio do Maracanãzinho, Rio de Janeiro

22 May

Puerto Rico	64–88	United States
Scoring by half: 26-33, 38-55

Ginásio do Maracanãzinho, Rio de Janeiro

23 May

Italy	73–101	United States
Scoring by half: 28-59, 45-42

Ginásio do Maracanãzinho, Rio de Janeiro

23 May

Soviet Union	79–90	Brazil
Scoring by half: 42-43, 37-47

Ginásio do Maracanãzinho, Rio de Janeiro

24 May

Italy	72–75	Puerto Rico
Scoring by half: 31-42, 41-33

Ginásio do Maracanãzinho, Rio de Janeiro

24 May

France	63–99	Yugoslavia
Scoring by half: 33-46, 30-53

Ginásio do Maracanãzinho, Rio de Janeiro

25 May

Soviet Union	67–69	Yugoslavia
Scoring by half: 28-34, 39-35

Ginásio do Maracanãzinho, Rio de Janeiro

25 May

Brazil	85–81	United States
Scoring by half: 39-39, 46-42

Ginásio do Maracanãzinho, Rio de Janeiro

== Awards ==
1963 World Championship winner

Brazil
Second title

Most Valuable Player
(Brazil) Wlamir Marques

== Final standings ==
Rank	Team	Record
1	Brazil	6–0
2	Yugoslavia	8–1
3	Soviet Union	7–2
4	United States	6–3
5	France	4–5
6	Puerto Rico	3–6
7	Italy	2–7
8	Argentina	4–4
9	Mexico	4–4
10	Uruguay	4–4
11	Canada	3–5
12	Peru	2–6
13	Japan	1–7
—	Philippines	Suspended

== All-Tournament Team ==
- Amaury Pasos (Brazil)
- Wlamir Marques - (MVP) (Brazil)
- Aleksander Petrov (USSR)
- Don Kojis (USA)
- Maxime Dorigo (France)

== Top scorers (ppg) ==
1. Ricardo Duarte (Peru) 23.1
2. Aleksander Petrov (USSR) 17.6
3. Luis Enrique Grajeda (Mexico) 17.5
4. Radivoj Korać (Yugoslavia) 16.8
5. Maxime Dorigo (France) 16.8
6. Alfredo Tulli (Argentina) 16.1
7. Alberto Desimone (Argentina) 16
8. Rafael Valle (Puerto Rico) 15.8
9. Nemanja Đurić (Yugoslavia) 14.6
10. Paolo Vittori (Italy) 14.3
