= Borislav Stanković =

Serbian basketball player and coach (1925–2020)

- Борислав Станковић
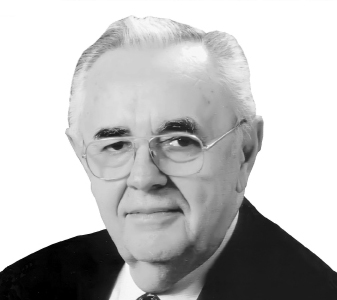

2nd Secretary General of FIBA
- In office 1 January 1976 – 1 January 2003
- Preceded by: William Jones
- Succeeded by: Patrick Baumann

Personal details
- Born: 9 July 1925 Bihać, Kingdom of Serbs, Croats and Slovenes
- Died: 20 March 2020 (aged 94) Belgrade, Serbia
- Education: University of Belgrade
- Occupation: Basketball player; table tennis player; basketball coach; basketball executive; veterinarian; sports administrator
- Nickname(s): Bora (Serbian Cyrillic: Бора), Boris (Борис)
- Basketball career

Career information
- Playing career: 1946–1953
- Position: Center
- Number: 7, 15, 4
- Coaching career: 1950–1970

Career history

Playing
- 1946–1948: Crvena Zvezda
- 1948–1950: Železničar Belgrade
- 1950–1953: Partizan

Career highlights
- As player: 3× Yugoslav League champion (1946–1948); As head coach: YABC Award for Lifetime Achievement (1995); 3× Yugoslav League champion (1958, 1960, 1964); Italian League champion (1968); Yugoslav Cup winner (1960); As executive: Olympic Order (1985); Order of Merit (2015)
- Basketball Hall of Fame
- Women's Basketball Hall of Fame
- FIBA Hall of Fame

Borislav "Bora" Stanković (Serbian Cyrillic: Борислав "Бора" Станковић; 9 July 1925 – 20 March 2020) was a Serbian basketball player and coach, as well as a longtime administrator in the sport's various governing bodies, including FIBA and the International Olympic Committee. He played 36 games for the Yugoslavian national basketball team internationally.

Stanković was pivotal in the FIBA decision to allow players from the National Basketball Association to compete at the Summer Olympics. In 1989, he introduced a resolution to amend FIBA regulations that had previously allowed players only from professional leagues other than the NBA to enter, and the subsequent vote passed 56–13. For his contributions to the game of basketball, Stanković was inducted into the Basketball Hall of Fame in 1991. He was inducted into the Women's Basketball Hall of Fame in 2000 and the FIBA Hall of Fame in 2007.

== Biography ==
Simultaneous to his studies, Stanković played professionally for Crvena zvezda (1946–1948), Železničar Beograd (1948–1950), and Partizan (1950–1953), and was on the senior Yugoslav national basketball team for five years, in the early 1950s. After retiring from competitive basketball, he coached OKK Beograd for ten consecutive seasons (1953–1963), and for a season in 1965. Stanković then moved on to the Italian club Pallacanestro Cantù, spending three seasons as its head coach (1966–1969).

Throughout his lengthy involvement with basketball, Stanković was a part of the Yugoslav Olympic Committee, the International Olympic Committee, and the Board of Trustees at the Basketball Hall of Fame. He served as FIBA's second Secretary General from 1976 to 2002.

From the beginning of his tenure as Secretary General, Stanković wanted FIBA to make NBA players eligible for international competitions, especially the Olympics. At the FIBA Congress in Madrid in 1986, his attempt to pass that resolution narrowly failed by a vote of 31–27. Undeterred, he continued to campaign for the idea, and at the 1989 FIBA Congress in Munich, his resolution overwhelmingly passed by a vote of 56–13. Beginning with the 1992 Summer Olympics in Barcelona, NBA players began competing at all of FIBA's international competitions.

Other than Serbian, Stanković fluently spoke six other languages. He was inducted into the Basketball Hall of Fame in 1991, as a contributor. He was inducted into the Women's Basketball Hall of Fame in 2000. In 2007, he was enshrined as a contributor into the FIBA Hall of Fame. FIBA named the annual international basketball cup the "FIBA Stanković Continental Champions' Cup".

== Personal life ==
Stanković was born in Bihać, Kingdom of Serbs, Croats and Slovenes (present-day Bosnia and Herzegovina). Early in his life, he moved to Novi Sad, and then to the Syrmian town of Ledinci, during World War II. After the war, Stanković went to Belgrade, where he graduated from the University of Belgrade, with a degree in veterinary medicine. In 1966, he pledged his efforts to basketball full-time, ending a 10-year career as a veterinary inspector for meat control in Belgrade.

Stanković died on 20 March 2020 in Belgrade. He had one daughter, two granddaughters and two great-grandchildren.

=== Orders and special awards ===
The following is a selected list of orders and special awards:

- Olympic Order (1987)
- (West Germany) Order of Merit of FR Germany (1987)
- (Senegal) National Order of the Lion (1999)
- (France) Knight of the Legion of Honour (2001)
- (Serbia and Montenegro) Order of Merits of FR Yugoslavia (2002)
- Order of Honor of Republika Srpska (2010)
- FIBA Order of Merit (2015)

== In popular culture ==
Stanković is portrayed by Aleksandar Radojičić in the 2015 Serbian sports drama We Will Be the World Champions and the 2016 Serbian TV series The World Champions.

== See also ==
- Radomir Šaper
- Aleksandar Nikolić
- Nebojša Popović

Sporting positions
Preceded by William Jones	Secretary General of FIBA; 1976–2002	Succeeded by Patrick Baumann
Preceded by William Jones	Secretary General Emeritus of FIBA; 2003–2020	Position disbanded
New creation	Honorary President of Basketball Federation of Serbia; 2005–2020	Position disbanded
Preceded by N/A	Secretary General of Basketball Federation of Yugoslavia; 1956–1966	Succeeded by N/A
