= First Federal Basketball League =

Basketball league

- Founded: 1945
- Folded: 1992
- Countries: (Socialist Federal Republic of Yugoslavia) Yugoslavia
- Level on pyramid: 1st Tier (Yugoslavia)
- Relegation to: First B Federal League
- Related competitions: Yugoslav Basketball Cup
- Last champions: Partizan (5th title)
- Most championships: Crvena zvezda (12 titles)
- All-time top scorer: Vinko Jelovac (7,351)

The First Federal Basketball League (Serbo-Croatian: Prva savezna košarkaška liga) was the highest tier level men's professional club basketball competition in the former country of SFR Yugoslavia. Founded in 1945, and folded in 1992 (1991–92 Wiener Broker YUBA League), it was run by the Basketball Federation of Yugoslavia. With a total of 16 European-wide trophy winners and 11 finalists, the Yugoslav First Basketball League was one of the strongest European national domestic basketball leagues of all time.

Although each of the former Yugoslav countries now have their own national domestic leagues, the six nations also now take part in the ABA League (commonly known as the Adriatic League), which was founded in 2001; and which is, the closest basketball league in existence today, that is similar to the former Yugoslav First Federal Basketball League.

== History ==
After the end of Second World War in Yugoslavia in 1945, there arose a need for athletic development in the fledgling nation. Post-WW2 Yugoslavia was (with the exception of major cities such as Belgrade, Ljubljana, Zagreb, and Sarajevo) for the most part lacking in competitive opportunities in sports. In response to this, 1945 and 1946 saw an explosion of new clubs and leagues for every sport, the basketball league being part of this phenomenon.

The very first competition under the newly formed Yugoslav Basketball League in 1945, drawing parallel to the Yugoslav First League (of football), was more or less a nationwide affirmation of unity. Instead of individual clubs competing in the usual fashion, there were only eight teams. Six representing each state within Yugoslavia, one representing the province of Vojvodina, and the last representing the Yugoslav People's Army.

Only in the 1970s did the basketball culture of Yugoslavia truly come to enjoy recognition as the top nation in basketball. Breaking away from the dominance of the Soviet Union, the Yugoslav league gave rise to stars that would go on to win multiple Basketball World Championships and European Basketball Championships. After a decade of dominance, the 1980s saw a disappointing slump of talent in the Yugoslav Basketball League. On 10 January 1985, Drazen Petrovic, of Cibona Zagreb scored 112 pts against SMELT Olimpija, a record in the league.

Once again the world witnessed a sleeping giant come awake in the early 90s as Yugoslavia won two straight European Basketball Championships and a World Basketball Championship. This momentum was swiftly halted by the ethnic strife which broke out in 1991. Clubs from SR Slovenia and SR Croatia withdrew from the league so that the 1991–92 season, the competition's last, was contested without them. The country got divided into five successor republics, each founding their own basketball federations with the exception of Serbia and Montenegro, which retained the name Federal Republic of Yugoslavia and the YUBA League.

Despite all these changes, the joint league of clubs from the former Yugoslavia proved to be a winning league format formula, so on 3 July 2001, the Adriatic League was founded. It features teams from all the former Yugoslav states, and it exists alongside scaled-down versions of the individual national domestic leagues of each of the former Yugoslav states.

== Title holders ==
- 1945: Yugoslav Army
- 1946: Crvena zvezda
- 1947: Crvena zvezda
- 1948: Crvena zvezda
- 1949: Crvena zvezda
- 1950: Crvena zvezda
- 1951: Crvena zvezda
- 1952: Crvena zvezda
- 1953: Crvena zvezda
- 1954: Crvena zvezda
- 1955: Crvena zvezda
- 1956: Proleter Zrenjanin
- 1957: AŠK Olimpija
- 1958: OKK Beograd
- 1959: AŠK Olimpija
- 1960: OKK Beograd
- 1961: AŠK Olimpija
- 1962: AŠK Olimpija
- 1963: OKK Beograd
- 1964: OKK Beograd
- 1965: Zadar
- 1966: AŠK Olimpija
- 1967: Zadar
- 1967–68: Zadar
- 1968–69: Crvena zvezda
- 1969–70: AŠK Olimpija
- 1970–71: Jugoplastika
- 1971–72: Crvena zvezda
- 1972–73: Radnički Belgrade
- 1973–74: Zadar
- 1974–75: Zadar
- 1975–76: Partizan
- 1976–77: Jugoplastika
- 1977–78: Bosna
- 1978–79: Partizan
- 1979–80: Bosna
- 1980–81: Partizan
- 1981–82: Cibona
- 1982–83: Bosna (Note: On Saturday, 9 April 1983 at Baldekin Hall in Šibenik, Šibenka and Bosna played the deciding game 3 of their best-of-three playoff final series. The contest was decided in the very last second: Bosna's Sabit Hadžić got called for a foul on Šibenka's Dražen Petrović who proceeded to score two free throws that won the game. The next morning, after watching video replays of the game's last moments, the presidency of the Basketball Federation of Yugoslavia (KSJ) established that the foul happened after time had already elapsed. The game was thus voided and a rematch was ordered at a neutral venue in Novi Sad. Unhappy with the decision Šibenka decided to boycott it, refusing to show up for the rematch. The championship got awarded to Bosna.)
- 1983–84: Cibona
- 1984–85: Cibona
- 1985–86: Zadar
- 1986–87: Partizan
- 1987–88: Jugoplastika
- 1988–89: Jugoplastika
- 1989–90: Jugoplastika
- 1990–91: POP 84
- 1991–92: Partizan

=== Performance by club ===
Club	Titles	Years won	Runners up
(Socialist Republic of Serbia) Crvena zvezda	12	1946, 1947, 1948, 1949, 1950, 1951, 1952, 1953, 1954, 1955, 1969, 1972	8
(Socialist Republic of Slovenia) Olimpija	6	1957, 1959, 1961, 1962, 1966, 1970	8
(Socialist Republic of Croatia) Split	6	1971, 1977, 1988, 1989, 1990, 1991	6
(Socialist Republic of Croatia) Zadar	6	1965, 1967, 1968, 1974, 1975, 1986	3
(Socialist Republic of Serbia) Partizan	5	1976, 1979, 1981, 1987, 1992	10
(Socialist Republic of Serbia) Beograd	4	1958, 1960, 1963, 1964	1
(Socialist Republic of Croatia) Cibona	3	1982, 1984, 1985	4
(Socialist Republic of Bosnia and Herzegovina) Bosna	3	1978, 1980, 1983	1
(Socialist Republic of Serbia) Proleter	1	1956	4
(Socialist Republic of Serbia) Radnički	1	1973	-
(Socialist Republic of Croatia) Mladost	-		1
(Socialist Republic of Croatia) Šibenik	-		1

=== Performance by constitutional republics ===
Titles	Republic
23	(Socialist Republic of Serbia) SR Serbia
15	(Socialist Republic of Croatia) SR Croatia
6	(Socialist Republic of Slovenia) SR Slovenia
3	(Socialist Republic of Bosnia and Herzegovina) SR Bosnia and Herzegovina

== Playoff finals ==
Playoffs, as a way of determining the Yugoslav First Basketball League champion following the regular season, got instituted in 1981 ahead of the 1981–82 season.

Season	Home court advantage	Coach	Result	Home court disadvantage	Coach	1st of Regular Season	Record
1981–82	Partizan	Borislav Ćorković	0–2	Cibona	Mirko Novosel	Partizan	18–4
1982–83	Šibenka	Vlade Đurović	1–2	Bosna	Svetislav Pešić	Šibenka	16–6
1983–84	Cibona	Mirko Novosel	2–1	Crvena zvezda	Ranko Žeravica	Cibona	16–6
1984–85	Cibona	Željko Pavličević	2–1	Crvena zvezda	Ranko Žeravica	Cibona	19–3
1985–86	Cibona	Željko Pavličević	1–2	Zadar	Vlade Đurović	Cibona	21–1
1986–87	Partizan	Duško Vujošević	2–0	Crvena zvezda	Vlade Đurović	Cibona	22–0
1987–88	Jugoplastika	Božidar Maljković	2–1	Partizan	Duško Vujošević	Jugoplastika	21–1
1988–89	Partizan	Duško Vujošević	0–2	Jugoplastika	Božidar Maljković	Partizan	16–6
1989–90	Jugoplastika	Božidar Maljković	3–1	Crvena zvezda	Zoran Slavnić	Jugoplastika	19–3
1990–91	POP 84	Željko Pavličević	3–0	Partizan	Duško Vujošević	Pop 84	19–3
1991–92	Partizan	Željko Obradović	3–0	Crvena zvezda	Duško Vujošević	Partizan	20–2

Source: official website archive

== Notable players ==
Award winners

Naismith Memorial Basketball Hall of Fame

- (Croatia) Krešimir Ćosić (1996)
- (Croatia) Dražen Petrović (2002)
- (Serbia) Dražen Dalipagić (2004)
- (Croatia) Dino Rađa (2018)
- (Serbia) Vlade Divac (2019)
- (Socialist Republic of Croatia) Toni Kukoč (2021)

FIBA Hall of Fame

- (Croatia) Krešimir Ćosić (2007)
- (Serbia) Dražen Dalipagić (2007)
- (Slovenia) Ivo Daneu (2007)
- (Bosnia and Herzegovina) Mirza Delibašić (2007)
- (Serbia) Radivoj Korać (2007)
- (Croatia) Dražen Petrović (2007)
- (Serbia) Vlade Divac (2010)
- (Serbia) Dragan Kićanović (2010)
- (Serbia) Zoran Slavnić (2013)

FIBA's 50 Greatest Players

- (Socialist Republic of Croatia) Krešimir Ćosić (1991)
- (Socialist Republic of Serbia) Dražen Dalipagić (1991)
- (Socialist Republic of Slovenia) Ivo Daneu (1991)
- (Socialist Republic of Bosnia and Herzegovina) Mirza Delibašić (1991)
- (Socialist Republic of Serbia) Vlade Divac (1991)
- (Socialist Republic of Serbia) Dragan Kićanović (1991)
- (Socialist Republic of Serbia) Radivoj Korać (1991)
- (Socialist Republic of Croatia) Toni Kukoč (1991)
- (Socialist Republic of Croatia) Dražen Petrović (1991)
- (Socialist Republic of Croatia) Dino Rađa (1991)
- (Socialist Republic of Croatia) Petar Skansi (1991)
- (Socialist Republic of Serbia) Zoran Slavnić (1991)

50 Greatest EuroLeague Contributors

- (Serbia) Dejan Bodiroga (2008)
- (Croatia) Krešimir Ćosić (2008)
- (Serbia) Predrag Danilović (2008)
- (Bosnia and Herzegovina) Mirza Delibašić (2008)
- (Serbia) Vlade Divac (2008)
- (Serbia) Aleksandar Đorđević (2008)
- (Serbia) Radivoj Korać (2008)
- (Croatia) Toni Kukoč (2008)
- (Croatia) Dražen Petrović (2008)
- (Croatia) Dino Rađa (2008)

EuroLeague Final Four MVP

- (Socialist Republic of Croatia) Dino Rađa (1989)
- (Socialist Republic of Croatia) (Croatia) Toni Kukoč (1990, 1991, 1993)
- (Federal Republic of Yugoslavia) Predrag Danilović (1992)
- (Federal Republic of Yugoslavia) Žarko Paspalj (1994)
- (Federal Republic of Yugoslavia) Zoran Savić (1998)
- (Federal Republic of Yugoslavia) Željko Rebrača (2000)
- (Federal Republic of Yugoslavia) Dejan Bodiroga (2002, 2003)

EuroLeague Finals Top Scorer

- (Socialist Republic of Croatia) Petar Skansi (1972)
- (Socialist Republic of Montenegro) Žarko Varajić (1979)
- (Socialist Republic of Croatia) Dražen Petrović (1985)

FIBA Saporta Cup Finals Top Scorer

- (Socialist Republic of Serbia) Zoran Slavnić (1974, 1975)
- (Socialist Republic of Serbia) Srećko Jarić (1977)
- (Socialist Republic of Croatia) Andro Knego (1982)
- (Socialist Republic of Serbia) Dragan Kićanović (1983)
- (Socialist Republic of Croatia) Dražen Petrović (1987, 1989)
- (Federal Republic of Yugoslavia) Branislav Prelević (1991, 1992, 1996)
- (Slovenia) Roman Horvat (1994)
- (North Macedonia) Petar Naumoski (1995, 2002)
- (Federal Republic of Yugoslavia) Predrag Danilović (2000)

FIBA Korać Cup Finals Top Scorer

- (Socialist Republic of Croatia) Nikola Plećaš (1972)
- (Socialist Republic of Serbia) Dražen Dalipagić (1974, 1978)
- (Socialist Republic of Croatia) Željko Jerkov (1977)
- (Socialist Republic of Serbia) Dragan Kićanović (1979)
- (Socialist Republic of Croatia) Dražen Petrović (1988)
- (Socialist Republic of Serbia) Vlade Divac (1989)
- (Federal Republic of Yugoslavia) Aleksandar Đorđević (1993, 1999)
- (Slovenia) Teoman Alibegović (1995)
- (North Macedonia) Petar Naumoski (1996)

Euroscar

- (Socialist Republic of Serbia) Dražen Dalipagić (1980)
- (Socialist Republic of Serbia) Dragan Kićanović (1981, 1982)
- (Socialist Republic of Croatia) (Croatia) Dražen Petrović (1986, 1989, 1992, 1993)
- (Socialist Republic of Croatia) (Croatia) Toni Kukoč (1990, 1991, 1994, 1996, 1998)

Mr. Europa

- (Serbia) Dražen Dalipagić (1977, 1978)
- (Socialist Republic of Serbia) Dragan Kićanović (1981, 1982)
- (Socialist Republic of Croatia) (Croatia) Dražen Petrović (1986, 1993)
- (Socialist Republic of Serbia) Vlade Divac (1989)
- (Socialist Republic of Croatia) (Croatia) Toni Kukoč (1990, 1991, 1992, 1996)
- (Federal Republic of Yugoslavia) Aleksandar Đorđević (1994, 1995)

== Successor leagues ==
- (Serbia and Montenegro) YUBA League (1992–2006)
- (Croatia) HT Premijer liga (1991–present)
- (Slovenia) Premier A League (1991–present)
- (Bosnia and Herzegovina) Basketball Championship (1993–present)
- (North Macedonia) First League (1992–present)
- (Montenegro) Basketball League (2006–present)
- (Serbia) Basketball League (2006–present)
- Adriatic League (2001–present)

== See also ==
- Yugoslav 1. B Federal Basketball League
- Yugoslav Basketball Cup
