= Radivoj Korać =

Serbian professional basketball player

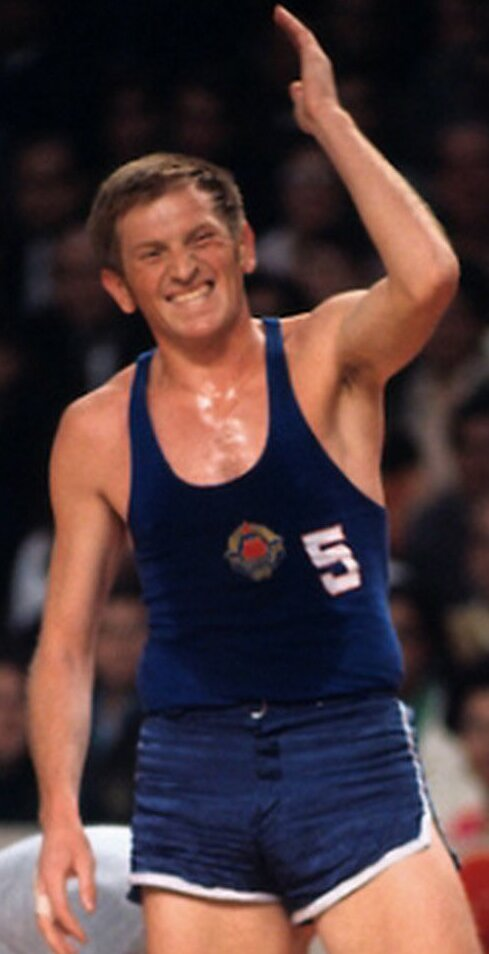
- Korać in 1963

Personal information
- Born: 5 November 1938 Sombor, Yugoslavia
- Died: 2 June 1969 (aged 30) Sarajevo, SR Bosnia and Herzegovina, Yugoslavia
- Listed height: 196 cm (6 ft 5 in)
- Listed weight: 94 kg (207 lb)

Career information
- Playing career: 1954–1969
- Position: Power forward
- Number: 5, 14

Career history
- 1954–1967: OKK Beograd
- 1967–1968: Standard Liège
- 1968–1969: Petrarca Padova

Career highlights
- EuroBasket MVP (1961); 4× FIBA EuroBasket Top Scorer (1959, 1961, 1963, 1965); Best Athlete of Yugoslavia (1960); Yugoslav Sportsman of the Year (1962); 3× FIBA European Selection (1964, 1965 2×); 7× Yugoslav League Top Scorer (1957, 1958, 1960, 1962–1965); Italian League Top Scorer (1969); Belgium League Top Scorer (1968); 4× Yugoslav League champion (1958, 1960, 1963, 1964); 2× Yugoslav Cup winner (1960, 1962); Belgium League champion (1968); FIBA's 50 Greatest Players; 50 Greatest EuroLeague Contributors
- Basketball Hall of Fame
- FIBA Hall of Fame
Medals
Men's basketball
Representing Yugoslavia
Summer Olympic Games
Silver medal – second place	1968 Mexico City
FIBA World Cup
Silver medal – second place	1963 Brazil
Silver medal – second place	1967 Uruguay
EuroBasket
Silver medal – second place	1961 Yugoslavia
Bronze medal – third place	1963 Poland
Silver medal – second place	1965 Soviet Union

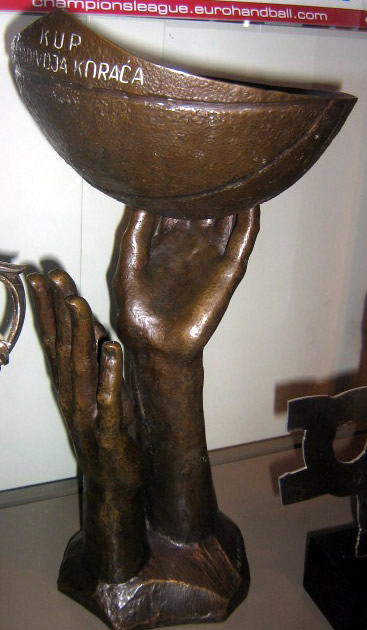
The Žućko's left trophy, that was awarded to the winner of FIBA Radivoj Korać Cup.

Radivoj Korać (Serbian Cyrillic: Радивој Кораћ; 5 November 1938 – 2 June 1969) was a Serbian and Yugoslav professional basketball player. He represented the Yugoslavia national basketball team internationally. Korać is well-known for holding the EuroLeague's all-time single-game scoring record (since 1958), at 99 points scored, in a game versus Alviks Stockholm, during the 1964–65 season, and for once making 100 out of 100 free throws on a live television show in Belgium.

Korać died in a car crash in 1969, at the age of 30, and FIBA Europe later established the European-wide third-tier level FIBA Radivoj Korać Cup, in his remembrance, in 1971. Korać was named one of FIBA's 50 Greatest Players in 1991. In 2002, the Basketball Federation of FR Yugoslavia named its top national domestic cup competition, the Radivoj Korać Cup, after him. He was enshrined into the FIBA Hall of Fame in 2007, and he was named one of the 50 Greatest EuroLeague Contributors the following year in 2008. In 2022, he was inducted into the Naismith Memorial Basketball Hall of Fame.

== Club career ==
Korać was born in Sombor, in the Kingdom of Yugoslavia. He started playing for OKK Beograd, at the age of 16, and played as a left-handed forward-center. Popularly nicknamed, Žućko ('Ginger'), and The Golden Left Hand, he became one of the best, if not the best, player of the Yugoslav First Federal League in the 1960s. In 1960, Korać was named The Best Athlete of Yugoslavia, and Yugoslav Sportsman of the Year. He was the best scorer of the Yugoslav First Federal League for seven seasons, which was a record. He scored a total of 5,185 points, in 169 games played in the Yugoslav League, for a career scoring average of 30.7 points per game. In 1962, in a Yugoslav First Federal League game against Mladost Zagreb, Korać scored 74 points.

With OKK Beograd, he won four Yugoslav League titles. Korać also played in multiple FIBA European Champions' Cup (EuroLeague) competitions with OKK Beograd. Korać was named a part of the best European selection, in both 1964 and 1965. In a two-game playoff series against Swedish League champions Alviks Stockholm, during the 1964–65 season of the FIBA European Champions' Cup (EuroLeague), he scored 170 points. He scored 71 points in the first game of the series, and 99 points in the second game of the series, for a series scoring average of 85 points per game. He averaged 54.8 points per game that season, which is the highest single-season scoring average in the EuroLeague's history, since 1958.

Korać's career scoring average in the EuroLeague was 43.6 points per game. He was also the best scorer in the Belgian League in 1968, while playing with Standard Liège, and the Italian League's best scorer in 1969, while playing with Padova.

== National team career ==
Korać entered into the senior Yugoslavian national basketball team in 1958, and went on to win five silver medals, and one bronze medal with them, in a total of 157 international games. He was the EuroBasket's Top Scorer 4 times (1959, 1961, 1963, 1965), and was named the MVP of EuroBasket 1961. He also won the silver medal at both the 1963 FIBA World Championship, and the 1967 FIBA World Championship.

He was the Top Scorer of the 1960 Summer Olympic Games, and he won the silver medal at the 1968 Summer Olympic Games. With Yugoslavia's senior men's national team, he scored 3,153 points in 157 games played, for a scoring average of 20.1 points per game. He was the leading scorer in the 1960 games.

== Personal life ==
Away from the basketball court, Korać enjoyed theatre, music, and reading books. He was a senior undergraduate, from the Faculty of Electrical Engineering (ETF), at the University of Belgrade. Surprisingly, he once turned down a contract offer to play with Red Star Belgrade.

== Death and legacy ==
On Monday 2 June 1969, Korać died in a car crash, just outside of Sarajevo, on the road between Vogošća and Semizovac. The Yugoslav Basketball Federation decided that no basketball games would be played in Yugoslavia, on 2 June again. He is interred in the Alley of Distinguished Citizens in the Belgrade New Cemetery.

In 1971, FIBA Europe established the FIBA Radivoj Korać Cup. After the third-tier level European-wide Cup folded in the year 2002, the Basketball Federation of Serbia and Montenegro renamed its national domestic cup competition to Radivoj Korać Cup, which is the name it still carries today in Serbia.

== In popular culture ==
- In the 2011 Serbian biopic and semi-documentary film Ginger: More Than a Game, Korać is portrayed by Vladimir Aleksić. The film tells the story of his life.
- In the 2015 Serbian sports drama We Will Be the World Champions, Korać is portrayed by Dejan Dedić. Dedić also reprised his role in the 2016 Serbian TV series Prvaci sveta.

== See also ==
- List of basketball players who died during their careers
- List of Yugoslav League annual scoring leaders
- List of Yugoslav League career scoring leaders
- List of players in the Naismith Memorial Basketball Hall of Fame
- List of members of the FIBA Hall of Fame
- FIBA Korać Cup
- Radivoj Korać Cup

== Notes ==
1. His name is also sometimes incorrectly spelled as Radivoje.

Awards
Preceded by Stanko Lorger	The Best Athlete of Yugoslavia; 1960	Succeeded by Miroslav Cerar
Preceded by Bernard Vukas	Yugoslav Sportsman of the Year; 1960	Succeeded by Miroslav Cerar
