= Crvena Zvezda–Partizan basketball rivalry =

Basketball rivalry in Belgrade, Serbia

Eternal derby
- Native name: Вечити дерби
- Sport: Basketball
- Location: (Serbia) Belgrade
- Teams: Crvena zvezda; Partizan
- First meeting: 6 September 1946; Crvena zvezda 21, Partizan 24 (Yugoslav League)
- Latest meeting: 22 October 2026; Partizan 85, Crvena zvezda 82 (EuroLeague)
- Next meeting: 11 February 2027; Crvena zvezda v Partizan (EuroLeague)
- Stadiums: Aleksandar Nikolić Hall (8,000); Ranko Žeravica Sports Hall (5,000); Belgrade Arena (20,000)
- Trophy: Partizan 51 titles Crvena zvezda 49 titles

Statistics
- Total meetings: 317 meetings
- Most wins: Partizan 164 (.526)
- All-time record: Partizan, 164–5–148
- Largest victory: +41; Partizan 118, Crvena zvezda 77; 5 April 2011 (Serbian League)
- Largest goal scoring: 221; Partizan 111, Crvena zvezda 110; 22 December 1984 (Yugoslav League)

Finals history
- 1987 Yugoslav Finals: Partizan won, 2–0; 1992 Yugoslav Finals: Partizan won, 3–0; 1993 Yugoslav Finals: Crvena zvezda won, 3–2; 1994 Yugoslav Finals: Crvena zvezda won, 4–1; 2006 Serb.-Monte. Finals: Partizan won, 3–0; 2007 Serbian Finals: Partizan won, 3–1; 2009 Serbian Finals: Partizan won, 3–2; 2012 Serbian Finals: Partizan won, 3–1; 2013 Serbian Finals: Partizan won, 3–1; 2014 Serbian Finals: Partizan won, 3–1; 2015 Serbian Finals: Crvena zvezda won, 3–0; 2016 Serbian Finals: Crvena zvezda won, 3–1; 2019 Serbian Finals: Crvena zvezda won, 3–1; 2024 Serbian Finals: Crvena zvezda won, 2-0; 2013 Adriatic Final: Partizan won; 2022 Adriatic Finals: Crvena zvezda won 3–2; 2023 Adriatic Finals: Partizan won 3–2; 2024 Adriatic Finals: Crvena zvezda won 3–0; 1973 Yugoslav Cup Final: Crvena zvezda won; 1994 Yugoslav Cup Final: Partizan won; 2009 Serbian Cup Final: Partizan won; 2012 Serbian Cup Final: Partizan won; 2013 Serbian Cup Final: Crvena zvezda won; 2017 Serbian Cup Final: Crvena zvezda won; 2018 Serbian Cup Final: Partizan won; 2019 Serbian Cup Final: Partizan won; 2020 Serbian Cup Final: Partizan won; 2022 Serbian Cup Final: Crvena zvezda won; 2024 Serbian Cup Final: Crvena zvezda won; 2025 Serbian Cup Final: Crvena zvezda won
- Locations of the headquarters of the two clubs

Crvena zvezda	Partizan

The Crvena zvezda–Partizan basketball rivalry, commonly referred as the Eternal derby (Serbian Cyrillic: Вечити дерби), is an Adriatic League, Serbian League, and Belgrade-based rivalry between Crvena zvezda and Partizan. These two men's basketball clubs are the biggest and most popular clubs in Serbia. The two clubs both play their home games at Aleksandar Nikolić Hall or Belgrade Arena in Belgrade. The rivalry started immediately after the creation of the two clubs in 1945 and the two clubs have been dominant in domestic basketball since then. It is present in a number of different sports but the most intense matches are in football sections of both clubs.

The two clubs have won the two highest numbers of national titles in Serbia: Crvena zvezda won 24, two more than Partizan. Together, they account for 17 of the 48 national titles in Yugoslavia (1945–1992), 11 of 14 national titles in Serbia and Montenegro (1992–2006), and all national titles in Serbia (2006 onwards). Also, the two clubs have won the two highest numbers of championships in the Adriatic League, Partizan 8, Crvena zvezda 7. Together, they account for 15 of 22 championships. Partizan is defending ABA champion in the upcoming season.

In European competitions, Crvena zvezda won a FIBA Saporta Cup (then known as European Cup Winner's Cup) in 1974, while Partizan was the European champion in 1992 and won 3 FIBA Korać Cups.

Aleksandar Nikolić and Zoran Slavnić are the only individuals who have played and coached both Crvena zvezda and Partizan in their careers.

== History ==
=== 1946–1992: Yugoslavia ===
The first official game between Crvena zvezda and Partizan was held on 6 September 1946 in Belgrade. Partizan won with a 24–21 score.

=== 2006 onward: Serbia ===
Two clubs, Crvena zvezda and Partizan, won all national titles in the Serbian league since its inaugural season in 2006. Partizan won the first eight titles, until the 2013–14 season, while Crvena zvezda won the next nine seasons, concluding with the 2023–24 season (except 2019–20 because season was cancelled due to COVID-19). Partizan won title back in 2024–25 season.

== Home arenas ==
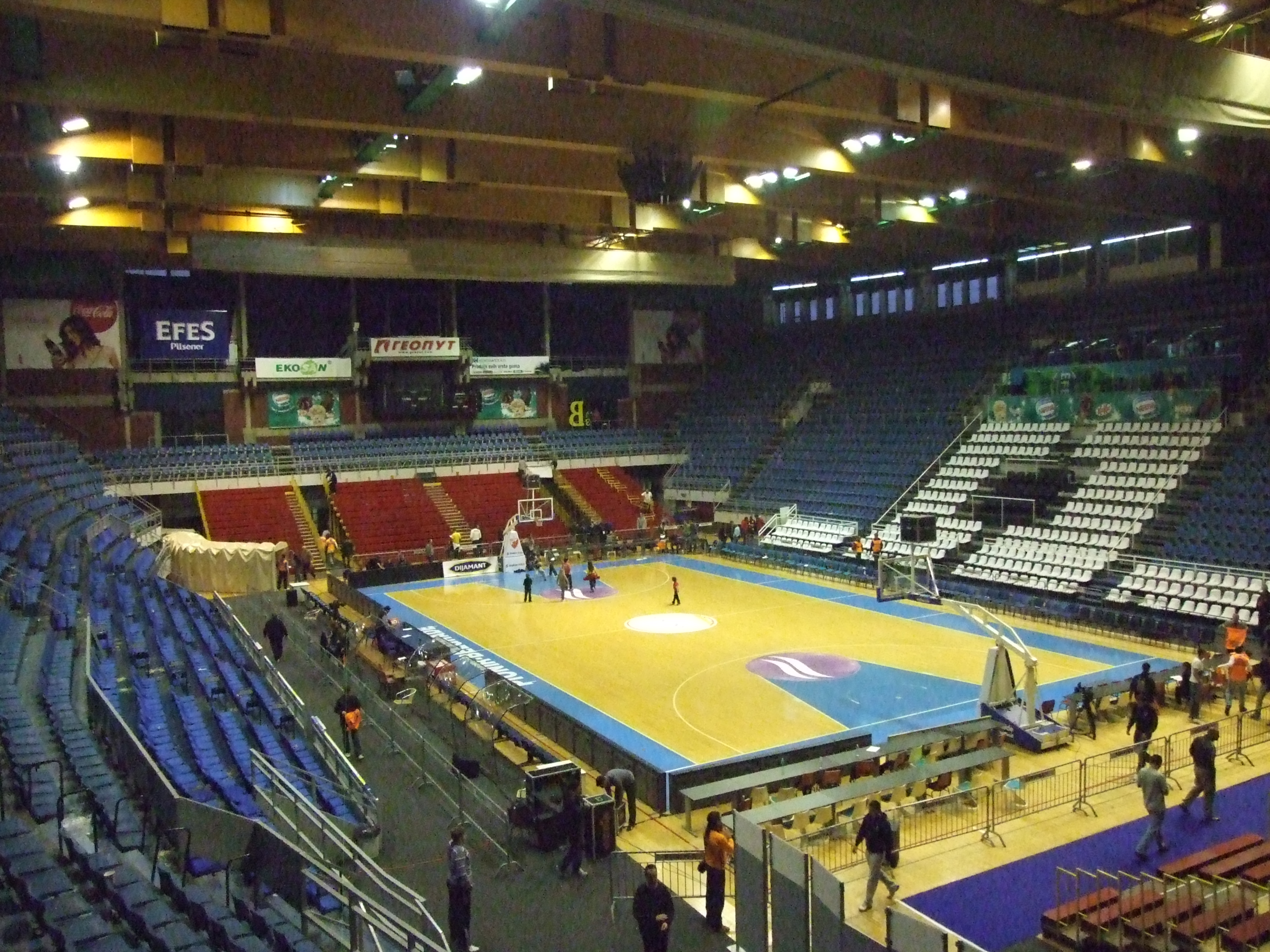
Inside of the Aleksandar Nikolić Hall

The two clubs both play their home games in Belgrade, at the Aleksandar Nikolić Hall or the Belgrade Arena, while Partizan also play their home games at the Ranko Žeravica Sports Hall.

Aleksandar Nikolić Hall

The Aleksandar Nikolić Hall, formerly known as Pionir Hall, is an indoor arena located in the Belgrade's municipality Palilula. The arena was built in 1973 in eleven months, by Energoprojekt. It has a seating capacity of 8,000, following an expansion and renovation in 2019. It was renamed in 2016 in honour of Basketball Hall of Famer Aleksandar Nikolić who played for and coached both clubs. Crvena zvezda play their home games in Serbian, Adriatic, and European competitions. On the other hand, Partizan occasionally play their home games only in domestic competitions.

Belgrade Arena

The Belgrade Arena, is an indoor arena located in the Belgrade's municipality New Belgrade. The arena was finished and opened in 2004. It has a seating capacity of 18,386, but the current record stands at 24,232, which was set in 2014, Partizan occasionally play their home games in EuroLeague, while Partizan play there in Adriatic and European competitions.

Ranko Žeravica Hall

The Ranko Žeravica Sports Hall is an indoor arena located in the Belgrade's municipality New Belgrade, as well. The arena was finished and opened in 1968. It has a seating capacity of 5,000. Partizan only uses the arena for their home games in domestic competitions. Formerly known as New Belgrade Hall, it was renamed in 2016 in honour of basketball coach Ranko Žeravica.

== Head-to-head ==
=== Recent matches ===
The following are the matches between Crvena zvezda and Partizan in the current season:

13 March 2023 2022–23 ABA M2	Partizan Mozzart Bet	92–81	Crvena zvezda Meridianbet	Belgrade
20:30	Scoring by quarter: 13–24, 21–24, 29–18, 29–15
Arena Sport	Pts: Lessort 27; Rebs: Lessort 8 Asts: Madar 5 PIR: Lessort 38	Boxscore	Pts: Campazzo 21; Rebs: Martin 6 Asts: Campazzo 5 PIR: Campazzo 27	Arena: Štark Arena; Attendance: 17,124; Referees: Tomislav Hordov, Milan Nedović, Luka Kardum

13 June 2023 2023 ABA Finals 1	Partizan Mozzart Bet	88–80	Crvena zvezda Meridianbet	Belgrade
20:00	Scoring by quarter: 29–21, 27–15, 17–25, 15–19
	Pts: LeDay 24; Rebs: LeDay, Lessort 5 Asts: Madar 5 PIR: Punter 26	Boxscore	Pts: Dobrić 17; Rebs: Dobrić 6 Asts: Campazzo 10; PIR: Campazzo 20	Arena: Štark Arena; Attendance: 18,324; Referees: Saša Pukl, Josip Radojković, Milan Nedović

15 June 2023 2023 ABA Finals 2	Partizan Mozzart Bet	87–78	Crvena zvezda Meridianbet	Belgrade
20:00	Scoring by quarter: 23–22, 21–22, 24–18, 19–16
	Pts: Nunnally, Smailagić 15; Rebs: LeDay 6 Asts: Madar 7 PIR: LeDay 18	Boxscore	Pts: Nedović 21; Rebs: Bentil 7 Asts: Campazzo 7 PIR: Nedović 15	Arena: Štark Arena; Attendance: 18,477; Referees: Matej Boltauzer, Miloš Koljenšić, Sašo Petek

18 June 2023 2023 ABA Finals 3	Crvena zvezda Meridianbet	91–78	Partizan Mozzart Bet	Belgrade
20:30	Scoring by quarter: 19–21, 19–20, 24–18, 29–19
	Pts: Nedović 19; Rebs: Mitrović 7 Asts: Campazzo 6 PIR: Petrušev 23	Boxscore	Pts: Exum 16; Rebs: Lessort 9 Asts: Exum 3 PIR: Exum 13	Arena: Aleksandar Nikolić Hall; Attendance: 7,648; Referees: Damir Javor, Tomislav Hordov, Luka Kardum

20 June 2023 2023 ABA Finals 4	Crvena zvezda Meridianbet	68–56	Partizan Mozzart Bet	Belgrade
19:00	Scoring by quarter: 20–13, 12–11, 17–15, 19–17
	Pts: Campazzo 21; Rebs: Dobrić 7 Asts: Campazzo 4 PIR: Campazzo, Dobrić 18	Boxscore	Pts: Exum 12; Rebs: Exum 10; Asts: Lessort 3 PIR: Lessort 20	Arena: Aleksandar Nikolić Hall; Attendance: 7,430; Referees: Saša Pukl, Matej Boltauzer, Josip Radojković

22 June 2023 2023 ABA Finals 5	Partizan Mozzart Bet	96–85	Crvena zvezda Meridianbet	Belgrade
20:00	Scoring by quarter: 30–18, 24–16, 21–34, 21–17
	Pts: Punter 32; Rebs: Lessort 8 Asts: Exum 5 PIR: Punter 36	Boxscore	Pts: Dobrić 18; Rebs: Dobrić, Petrušev 5 Asts: Campazzo 8 PIR: Dobrić 22	Arena: Štark Arena; Attendance: 22,198; Referees: Saša Pukl, Damir Javor, Tomislav Hordov

26 October 2023 2023–24 EuroLeague M1	Partizan Mozzart Bet	88–86	Crvena zvezda Meridianbet	Belgrade
18:30 (CET)	Scoring by quarter: 22–13, 20–29, 11–23, 35–21
	Pts: Avramović 14; Rebs: Kaminsky 5 Asts: Le Day & Nunnally 4 PIR: LeDay 20	Boxscore	Pts: Bolomboy 16; Rebs: Mitrović 8 Asts: Teodosić 6 PIR: Mitrović 19	Arena: Štark Arena; Attendance: 20,039; Referees: Miguel Angel Perez, Gytis Vilius, Rain Peerandi

30 October 2023 2023–24 ABA M1	Partizan Mozzart Bet	98–87	Crvena zvezda Meridianbet	Belgrade
20:00	Scoring by quarter: 17–25, 30–11, 25–27, 26–24
Arena Sport	Pts: Kaminsky 22; Rebs: Le Day, Smailagić & Dozier 4 Asts: Dozier 8 PIR: Kaminsky 27	Boxscore	Pts: Napier 23; Rebs: Giedraitis 6 Asts: Napier 8 PIR: Mitrović & Napier 20	Arena: Štark Arena; Attendance: 20,007; Referees: Matej Boltauzer, Tomislav Hordov, Uroš Nikolić

4 January 2024 2023–24 EuroLeague M2	Crvena zvezda Meridianbet	88–72	Partizan Mozzart Bet	Belgrade
20:00 (CET)	Scoring by quarter: 24–13, 26–16, 15–19, 23–24
	Pts: Nedović 16; Rebs: Giedraitis 7 Asts: Teodosić 7 PIR: Teodosić 23	Boxscore	Pts: Punter 17; Rebs: Caboclo 7 Asts: Dozier, Nunnally 3 PIR: Caboclo 18	Arena: Štark Arena; Attendance: 20,143; Referees: Fernando Rocha, Carlos Peruga, Piotr Pastusiak

28 January 2024 2023–24 ABA M2	Crvena zvezda Meridianbet	88–86	Partizan Mozzart Bet	Belgrade
19:00 (CET)	Scoring by quarter: 28-15, 27-23, 17-18, 16-30
	Pts: Hanga 15; Rebs: Bolomboy 13; Asts: Teodosić 5 PIR: Bolomboy 24	Boxscore	Pts: Nunnally 19; Rebs: Leday 6 Asts: Nunnally, Avramović, Dozier 4 PIR: Kaminsky 25	Arena: Štark Arena; Attendance: 18,796; Referees: Saša Pukl, Uroš Obrknežević, Josip Radojković

=== Matches in Adriatic competitions ===
The following are the matches between Crvena zvezda and Partizan in the Adriatic competitions:

Season	At Crvena zvezda (Crvena zvezda – Partizan)		At Partizan (Partizan – Crvena zvezda)		SuperCup (Crvena zvezda – Partizan)	Total	Notes
Season	Season	Post-season	Season	Post-season	SuperCup (Crvena zvezda – Partizan)	Total	Notes
2001–02	Both clubs did not participate				Not held	—	—
2002–03	Partizan did not participate				Not held	—	Crvena zvezda lose League Semifinal
2003–04	Partizan did not participate				Not held	—	Crvena zvezda lose League Semifinal
2004–05	81–95	—	86–95	86–82	Not held	Partizan 2–1	Partizan lose League Final; Crvena zvezda lose League Semifinal
2005–06	88–74	—	77–75	—	Not held	Tie 1–1	Partizan lose League Final; Crvena zvezda lose League Semifinal
2006–07	76–88	—	93–80	—	Not held	Partizan 2–0	Partizan win League
2007–08	81–88	—	82–67	—	Not held	Partizan 2–0	Partizan win League
2008–09	82–85	—	80–81	64–58	Not held	Partizan 2–1	Partizan win League; Crvena zvezda lose League Semifinal
2009–10	74–84	—	73–76	—	Not held	Tie 1–1	Partizan win League
2010–11	68–76	—	99–68	—	Not held	Partizan 2–0	Partizan win League
2011–12	69–84	—	85–67	—	Not held	Partizan 2–0	Partizan lose League Semifinal
2012–13	84–76	—	78–92	71–63	Not held	Crvena zvezda 2–1	Partizan win League; Crvena zvezda lose League Final
2013–14	63–57	—	83–86	—	Not held	Crvena zvezda 2–0	Both clubs lose League Semifinals
2014–15	76–67	73–64, 68–70	77–63	85–95, 73–81	Not held	Crvena zvezda 4–2	Crvena zvezda win League; Partizan lose League Semifinals
2015–16	92–77	—	86–81	—	Not held	Tie 1–1	Crvena zvezda win League
2016–17	83–72	—	86–81	—	Not held	Tie 1–1	Crvena zvezda win League; Partizan lose League Semifinals
2017–18	86–74	—	84–100	—	Crvena Zvezda withdrew (Note: Top seeded Crvena Zvezda withdrew participation due to the previously scheduled EuroLeague tournament, which was held on the same time.)	Crvena zvezda 2–0	Crvena zvezda lose League Finals; Partizan lose League Semifinals
2018–19	70–68	106–101, 84–63	71–77	70–67	—	Crvena zvezda 4–1	Crvena zvezda win both titles Partizan lose League Semifinals
2019–20	92–86	Canceled (Note: The 2019–20 ABA League First Division was canceled due to the COVID-19 pandemic.)	75–72	Canceled	—	Tie 1–1	League season canceled Partizan win SuperCup
2020–21	73–64	—	85–86	—	Canceled	Crvena zvezda 2–0	Crvena zvezda win League
2021–22	71–56	90–76, 85–81, 80–77	98–84	70–67, 112–84	Not held	Crvena zvezda 4–3	Crvena zvezda win League; Partizan lose League Finals
2022–23	90–74	91–78, 68–56	92–81	88–80, 87–78, 96–85	Not held	Partizan 4–3	Partizan win League; Crvena zvezda lose League Finals
2023–24	88–86	85-82, 80-73	98–87	76-82	—	Crvena zvezda 4–1	Crvena zvezda win League; Partizan lose League Finals and SuperCup Final
2024–25	89–84	—	85–77	—	Not held	Tie 1–1	Partizan win League; Crvena zvezda lose League Semifinals
2025–26	100–96	78-89	81–74	100–94	Not held	Partizan 3–1	Partizan lose League Finals; Crvena zvezda lose League Semifinals
2026–27					Not held		

=== Matches in Serbian competitions ===
The following are the matches between Crvena zvezda and Partizan in the Serbian top-tier competitions:

Season	At Crvena zvezda (Crvena zvezda – Partizan)		At Partizan (Partizan – Crvena zvezda)		Radivoj Korać Cup (Crvena zvezda – Partizan)	Total	Notes
Season	Season	Post-season	Season	Post-season	Radivoj Korać Cup (Crvena zvezda – Partizan)	Total	Notes
2006–07	88–92	83–100, 67–84	91–86	91–89, 77–91	—	Partizan 5–1	Partizan win League; Crvena zvezda lose League Finals; Partizan lose Cup Final
2007–08	78–83	80–89	86–77	93–73	—	Partizan 4–0	Partizan win both titles
2008–09	—	54–68, 75–73	—	70–58, 58–63, 73–61	65–80	Partizan 4–2	Partizan win both titles Crvena zvezda lose both finals
2009–10	65–79	74–85	103–75	94–73	—	Partizan 4–0	Partizan win both titles
2010–11	92–95	—	118–77	—	—	Partizan 2–0	Partizan win both titles
2011–12	78–83	68–56, 82–86	76–69	92–83, 78–72	51–64	Partizan 6–1	Partizan win both titles Crvena zvezda lose both finals
2012–13	67–77	69–71, 52–68	69–76	82–54, 74–81	78–69	Partizan 4–3	Partizan win League; Crvena zvezda lose League Finals; Crvena zvezda win Cup; Partizan lose Cup Final
2013–14	78–82	62–82, 87–95	72–75	88–97, 77–67	—	Partizan 4–2	Partizan win League; Crvena zvezda lose League Finals; Crvena zvezda win Cup
2014–15	92–76	78–64, 58–54	92–82	69–72	76–67	Crvena zvezda 5–1	Crvena zvezda win both titles Partizan lose League Finals
2015–16	—	84–53, 72–75	—	86–87, 65–70	60–68	Crvena zvezda 3–2	Crvena zvezda win League; Partizan lose both finals
2016–17	85–74	—	78–77	—	74–64	Crvena zvezda 2–1	Crvena zvezda win both titles Partizan lose Cup Final
2017–18	—	87–62	—	73–81	75–81	Crvena zvezda 2–1	Crvena zvezda win League; Partizan win Cup; Crvena zvezda lose Cup Final
2018–19	—	98–94, 96–90	—	73–72, 75–76	74–76	Crvena zvezda 3–2	Crvena zvezda win League; Partizan lose League Finals; Partizan win Cup; Crvena zvezda lose Cup Final
2019–20	League season canceled (Note: The 2019–20 Basketball League of Serbia was canceled due to the COVID-19 pandemic in Serbia.)				84–85	Partizan 1–0	Partizan win Cup; Crvena zvezda lose Cup Final
2020–21	Not held	—	Not held	—	79–78	Crvena zvezda 1–0	Crvena zvezda win both titles
2021–22	Not held	Partizan withdrew	Not held	Partizan withdrew	85–68	Crvena zvezda 1–0	Crvena zvezda win both titles Partizan lose Cup Final
2022–23	Not held	Partizan withdrew	Not held	Partizan withdrew	83–75	Crvena zvezda 1–0	Crvena zvezda win both titles
2023–24	Not held	89–88	Not held	0–20	85–79	Crvena zvezda 3–0	Crvena zvezda win both titles
2024–25	Not held	—	Not held	—	89–83	Crvena zvezda 1–0	Partizan win League; Crvena zvezda win Cup; Partizan lose Cup Final
2025–26	Not held	—	Not held	—	—	—	Crvena zvezda win Cup
2026–27	Not held		Not held				

=== Matches in European competitions ===
The following are the matches between Crvena zvezda and Partizan in the European competitions:

Competition	Season	At Crvena zvezda (Crvena zvezda – Partizan)		At Partizan (Partizan – Crvena zvezda)		Total	Notes
Competition	Season	Season	Post-season	Season	Post-season	Total	Notes
EuroLeague	2022–23	78–79	—	73–76	—	Tie 1–1	Partizan lose Playoffs series Crvena zvezda finishes 10th in Regular season
EuroLeague	2023–24	88–72	—	88–86	—	Tie 1–1	Partizan finishes 11th in Regular season Crvena zvezda finishes 16th in Regular season
EuroLeague	2024–25	77–89	—	71–73	—	Tie 1–1	Crvena zvezda lose Play-in match Partizan finishes 12th in Regular season
EuroLeague	2025–26	82–89	—	79–76	—	Partizan 2–0	Crvena zvezda lose Play-in match Partizan finishes 15th in Regular season
EuroLeague	2026–27			85–82		Partizan 1–0	

=== Matches in defunct competitions ===
==== 1946–1992: Yugoslavia ====
The following were the matches between Crvena zvezda and Partizan in the Yugoslav competitions: (Note: The competitions in the Federal Republic of Yugoslavia (after 1992) are not included.)

Matches
Season	At Crvena zvezda (Crvena zvezda – Partizan)		At Partizan (Partizan – Crvena zvezda)		Yugoslav Cup (Crvena zvezda – Partizan)	Total	Notes
Season	Season	Post-season	Season	Post-season	Yugoslav Cup (Crvena zvezda – Partizan)	Total	Notes
1946	21–24	Not held	—	Not held	Not held	Partizan 1–0	Crvena zvezda win League
1947	36–29	Not held	—	Not held	Not held	Crvena zvezda 1–0	Crvena zvezda win League
1948	—	Not held	—	Not held	Not held	—	Crvena zvezda win League
1949	13–21	Not held	29–33	Not held	Not held	Tie 1–1	Crvena zvezda win League
1950	56–32	Not held	22–24	Not held	Not held	Crvena zvezda 2–0	Crvena zvezda win League
1951	36–36	Not held	38–38	Not held	Not held	Tie 0–2–0	Crvena zvezda win League
1952	52–40	Not held	46–56, 29–47	Not held	Not held	Crvena zvezda 3–0	Crvena zvezda win League
1953	82–56, 70–53	Not held	59–69, 59–70	Not held	Not held	Crvena zvezda 4–0	Crvena zvezda win League
1954	68–59	Not held	74–84	Not held	Not held	Crvena zvezda 2–0	Crvena zvezda win League
1955	82–75	Not held	68–77	Not held	Not held	Crvena zvezda 2–0	Crvena zvezda win League
1956	64–64	Not held	66–66	Not held	Not held	Tie 0–2–0	
1957	72–66	Not held	70–81	Not held	Not held	Crvena zvezda 2–0	
1958	80–63	Not held	57–57	Not held	Not held	Crvena zvezda 1–1–0	
1959	89–90	Not held	74–97	Not held	—	Tie 1–1	
1960	87–70	Not held	83–65	Not held	—	Tie 1–1	
1961	78–83	Not held	67–55	Not held	Not held	Partizan 2–0	
1962	82–84	Not held	71–72	Not held	—	Tie 1–1	Partizan lose Cup Final
1963	77–99	Not held	109–91	Not held	Not held	Partizan 2–0	
1964	85–70	Not held	88–89	Not held	Not held	Crvena zvezda 2–0	
1965	74–77	Not held	64–81	Not held	Not held	Tie 1–1	
1966	76–86	Not held	69–75	Not held	Not held	Tie 1–1	
1967	83–65	Not held	75–80	Not held	Not held	Crvena zvezda 2–0	
1967–68	64–62	Not held	76–86	Not held	Not held	Crvena zvezda 2–0	
1968–69	77–69	Not held	82–88	Not held	—	Crvena zvezda 2–0	Crvena zvezda win League
1969–70	80–72	Not held	75–73	Not held	—	Tie 1–1	
1970–71	86–74	Not held	78–73	Not held	103–71	Crvena zvezda 2–1	Crvena zvezda win Cup
1971–72	101–85	Not held	78–80	Not held	—	Crvena zvezda 2–0	Crvena zvezda win League
1972–73	92–84	Not held	80–85	Not held	71–65	Crvena zvezda 3–0	Crvena zvezda win Cup; Partizan lose Cup Final
1973–74	79–87	Not held	88–78	Not held	81–80	Partizan 2–1	Crvena zvezda lose Cup Final
1974–75	81–86	Not held	93–82	Not held	102–100	Partizan 2–1	Crvena zvezda win Cup
1975–76	88–93	Not held	96–91	Not held	—	Partizan 2–0	Partizan win League
1976–77	89–92	Not held	91–85	Not held	76–74	Partizan 2–1	
1977–78	90–113	Not held	96–93	Not held	—	Partizan 2–0	
1978–79	84–102	Not held	98–77	Not held	—	Partizan 2–0	Partizan win both titles
1979–80	89–80	Not held	92–90	Not held	—	Tie 1–1	
1980–81	87–89	Not held	90–85	Not held	—	Partizan 2–0	Partizan win League
1981–82	85–92	—	102–86	—	—	Partizan 2–0	Partizan lose League Finals
1982–83	95–94	—	86–92	—	—	Crvena zvezda 2–0	
1983–84	105–94	93–79	77–75	88–90	—	Crvena zvezda 3–1	Crvena zvezda lose League Finals
1984–85	107–81	—	111–110	—	—	Tie 1–1	Crvena zvezda lose League Finals
1985–86	99–104	—	84–107	—	91–96	Partizan 2–1	
1986–87	92–102	73–78	97–84	89–88	—	Partizan 4–0	Partizan win League; Crvena zvezda lose League Finals
1987–88	85–106	90–101	85–95	105–96	—	Partizan 3–1	Partizan lose League Finals
1988–89	99–98	85–83	94–97	106–92, 100–95	—	Crvena zvezda 3–2	Partizan win Cup; Partizan lose League Finals
1989–90	81–79	—	77–87	—	—	Crvena zvezda 2–0	Crvena zvezda lose League Finals and Cup Final
1990–91	95–100	—	108–79	—	—	Partizan 2–0	Partizan lose League Finals
1991–92 (Note: In the 1991–92 season, due to Yugoslav Wars, all teams from Slovenia and Croatia abandoned the competition and were replaced with new clubs from the First B Federal League.)	50–72	75–92	87–67	104–81, 92–81	—	Partizan 5–0	Partizan win both titles Crvena zvezda lose League Finals

==== 1992–2006: Serbia and Montenegro ====
The following were the matches between Crvena zvezda and Partizan in the Yugoslav/Serb–Montenegrin (Note: The country was named the Federal Republic of Yugoslavia until 2003 and Serbia and Montenegro after that.) competitions:

Matches
Season	At Crvena zvezda (Crvena zvezda – Partizan)		At Partizan (Partizan – Crvena zvezda)		Yugoslav Cup / Radivoj Korać Cup (Crvena zvezda – Partizan)	Total	Notes
Season	Season	Post-season	Season	Post-season	Yugoslav Cup / Radivoj Korać Cup (Crvena zvezda – Partizan)	Total	Notes
1992–93	88–85, 93–78	89–87, 67–82, 72–64	94–97, 84–72	77–83, 70–68	—	Crvena zvezda 6–3	Crvena zvezda win League; Partizan lose League Finals and Cup Final
1993–94	67–81, 87–89	103–88, 69–78, 80–79	74–70, 83–80	64–77, 85–99	102–104	Partizan 6–4	Crvena zvezda win League; Partizan lose League Finals; Partizan win Cup; Crvena zvezda lose Cup Final
1994–95	95–93	—	95–80	—	—	Tie 1–1	Partizan win both titles
1995–96	72–63	—	82–78	—	84–102	Partizan 2–1	Partizan win League; Partizan lose Cup Final
1996–97	57–68	—	98–71	—	—	Partizan 2–0	Partizan win League; Partizan lose Cup Final
1997–98	69–77	—	78–86	—	—	Tie 1–1	Crvena zvezda win League
1998–99	84–72	Not held	84–85	Not held	—	Crvena zvezda 2–0	Partizan win Cup
1999–00	69–54	90–68, 82–79	80–74	77–75, 91–83, 67–65	—	Partizan 4–3	Partizan win Cup; Partizan lose League Finals
2000–01	74–83	—	93–81	—	—	Partizan 2–0	Partizan lose League Finals and Cup Final
2001–02	84–86	71–77	73–81	91–72	—	Partizan 3–1	Partizan win both titles
2002–03	92–104	—	88–78	—	—	Partizan 2–0	Partizan win League
2003–04	91–92	—	84–67	—	105–99	Partizan 2–1	Partizan win League; Crvena zvezda win Cup
2004–05	93–84	86–91	97–87	104–68	—	Partizan 3–1	Partizan win League; Partizan lose Cup Final
2005–06	—	73–89	—	20–0, 84–78	92–83	Partizan 3–1	Partizan win League; Crvena zvezda lose League Finals and win Cup

=== Statistics ===
Note: Last updated on 22 October 2026.

Competitions	Games played	Partizan wins	Draws	Crvena zvezda wins
Domestic Leagues	141	73 (.514)	5	63 (.451)
Domestic Playoffs	74	43 (.581)	—	31 (.419)
Domestic Cups	24	9 (.375)	—	15 (.625)
Adriatic League	69	33 (.478)	—	36 (.522)
EuroLeague	9	6 (.667)	—	3 (.333)
Total	317	164 (.526)	5	148 (.474)

== Common individuals ==
=== Players ===
The following players have played for both Crvena zvezda and Partizan in their careers:

- (Socialist Federal Republic of Yugoslavia) Strahinja Alagić – Partizan (1946); Crvena zvezda (1947–1951)
- (Serbia) Aleksandar Aranitović – Crvena zvezda (2016–2017); Partizan (2017–2019)
- (Serbia) Darko Balaban – Partizan (2007–2010); Crvena zvezda (2010–2011)
- (Montenegro) Boris Bakić – Partizan (2004–2007); Crvena zvezda (2007–2011)
- (Socialist Federal Republic of Yugoslavia) Milan Blagojević – Crvena zvezda (1947–1948); Partizan (1950–1956)
- (Serbia) Luka Bogdanović – Crvena zvezda (2002–2004); Partizan (2004–2007, 2014–2015)
- (Socialist Federal Republic of Yugoslavia) Nebojša Bukumirović – Partizan (1980–1984); Crvena zvezda (1990–1991)
- (Serbia) Aleksandar Cvetković – Crvena zvezda (2010–2013); Partizan (2015–2016)
- (Serbia and Montenegro) Goran Ćakić – Crvena zvezda (2002–2003); Partizan (2003–2004)
- (Socialist Federal Republic of Yugoslavia) Borislav Ćurčić – Crvena zvezda (1950–1955); Partizan (1958–1965)
- (Socialist Federal Republic of Yugoslavia) Dražen Dalipagić – Partizan (1971–1980; 1981–1982); Crvena zvezda (1990–1991)
- (Serbia) Nemanja Dangubić – Crvena zvezda (2014–2018); Partizan (2020–2022)
- (Serbia and Montenegro) Vlade Divac – Partizan (1986–1989); Crvena zvezda (1999)
- (Serbia and Montenegro) Milan Dozet – Partizan (1996–1998); Crvena zvezda (2001–2004)
- (Serbia) Strahinja Dragićević – Partizan (2006); Crvena zvezda (2009–2011)
- (Serbia and Montenegro) Vladimir Đokić – Partizan (1997–2000); Crvena zvezda (2000–2001)
- (Serbia and Montenegro) Aleksandar Gajić – Partizan (2000–2002); Crvena zvezda (2002–2003)
- (Serbia and Montenegro) Aleksandar Gilić – Crvena zvezda (1988–1990, 1993–1996); Partizan (1998–1999)
- (United States) James Gist – Partizan (2010–2011); Crvena zvezda (2019–2020)
- (Serbia) Milan Gurović – Partizan (2004); Crvena zvezda (2005–2007)
- (Serbia) Stefan Janković – Crvena zvezda (2017–2018); Partizan (2018–2019, 2020–2021)
- (Socialist Federal Republic of Yugoslavia) Ljubiša Janjić – Crvena zvezda (1965); Partizan (1967–1968)
- (Serbia and Montenegro) Nemanja Jelesijević – Partizan (1999–2000); Crvena zvezda (2004–2005)
- (Socialist Federal Republic of Yugoslavia) Slavoljub Jovanović – Crvena zvezda (N/A); Partizan (1949–1950)
- (Serbia) Raško Katić – Crvena zvezda (2004–2005, 2012–2014); Partizan (2010–2012)
- (United States) Tarence Kinsey – Partizan (2013–2014); Crvena zvezda (2016)
- (Socialist Federal Republic of Yugoslavia) Đorđe Konjović – Crvena zvezda (1953–1957); Partizan (1958)
- (Serbia) Mirko Kovač – Partizan (2000–2001, 2003–2005); Crvena zvezda (2006–2009)
- (Socialist Federal Republic of Yugoslavia) Đorđe Lazić – Crvena zvezda (1947–1948); Partizan (1951–1957)
- (Serbia) Marko Lekić – Partizan (2002–2003); Crvena zvezda (2008)
- (France) Mathias Lessort – Crvena zvezda (2017–2018); Partizan (2021–2023)
- (Serbia) Sava Lešić – Partizan (2009–2010); Crvena zvezda (2010–2012)
- (Serbia and Montenegro) Dragan Lukovski – Partizan (1995–1999); Crvena zvezda (1999–2000)
- (Serbia) Ivan Marinković – Crvena zvezda (2010–2011); Partizan (2011–2012)
- (Socialist Federal Republic of Yugoslavia) Zoran Marković – Crvena zvezda (1964–1966); Partizan (1969–1970, 1973–1974)
- (United States) Codi Miller-McIntyre – Partizan (2020–2021); Crvena zvezda (2024–2026)
- (Montenegro) Stevan Milošević – Crvena zvezda (2008); Partizan (2010)
- (Serbia) Strahinja Milošević – Partizan (2007–2010); Crvena zvezda (2010–2011)
- (Serbia) Andreja Milutinović – Crvena zvezda (2011–2013); Partizan (2014–2016)
- (Socialist Federal Republic of Yugoslavia) Aleksandar Nikolić – Partizan (1946–1947); Crvena zvezda (1947–1949)
- (Serbia and Montenegro) Igor Perović – Partizan (1991–1993); Crvena zvezda (1996–1998)
- (Serbia and Montenegro) Oliver Popović – Partizan (1986–1991); Crvena zvezda (1997–1999)
- (United States) Kevin Punter – Crvena zvezda (2019–2020); Partizan (2021–2024)
- (Serbia) Aleksa Radanov – Crvena zvezda (2015–2021); Partizan (2026)
- (Serbia) Ivan Radenović – Partizan (2002–2003); Crvena zvezda (2013–2014)
- (Socialist Federal Republic of Yugoslavia) Milan Radivojević – Crvena zvezda (1953–1954); Partizan (1955–1958)
- (Socialist Federal Republic of Yugoslavia) Branko Radović – Partizan (1954–1957); Crvena zvezda (1957–1960)
- (Serbia) Miroslav Raduljica – Partizan (2011–2012); Crvena zvezda (2022–2023)
- (United States) Lawrence Roberts – Crvena zvezda (2008–2009); Partizan (2009–2010)
- (North Macedonia) Predrag Samardžiski – Partizan (2004–2005); Crvena zvezda (2013)
- (Bosnia and Herzegovina) Goran Savanović – Crvena zvezda (2000–2001); Partizan (2004–2005)
- (Socialist Federal Republic of Yugoslavia) Zoran Slavnić – Crvena zvezda (1967–1977); Partizan (1981–1982)
- (Serbia and Montenegro) Zoran Sretenović – Crvena zvezda (1985–1986, 1995–1996); Partizan (1993–1994)
- (Socialist Federal Republic of Yugoslavia) Borislav Stanković – Crvena zvezda (1946–1948); Partizan (1950–1953)
- (Serbia and Montenegro) Jovo Stanojević – Crvena zvezda (1996–2000); Partizan (2001–2002)
- (Socialist Federal Republic of Yugoslavia) Radomir Šaper – Crvena zvezda (1945); Partizan (1946–1953)
- (Serbia and Montenegro) Mlađan Šilobad – Crvena zvezda (1989–1991, 2002–2003); Partizan (1991–1995, 2003–2004)
- (Serbia) Mlađen Šljivančanin – Partizan (2002–2003); Crvena zvezda (2007–2008)
- (North Macedonia) Slobodan Šljivančanin – Partizan (1990–1991); Crvena zvezda (2000)
- (Serbia and Montenegro) Dejan Tomašević – Crvena zvezda (1991–1995); Partizan (1995–1999)
- (Serbia and Montenegro) Dragoljub Vidačić – Crvena zvezda (1992–1995, 1998–1999); Partizan (1995–1997)
- (Argentina) Luca Vildoza – Crvena zvezda (2022–2023), Partizan (2026–present)
- (Serbia) Čedomir Vitkovac – Crvena zvezda (2003–2006); Partizan (2007–2009, 2015–2016)
- (Montenegro) Slavko Vraneš – Crvena zvezda (2004); Partizan (2007–2010)
- (Serbia and Montenegro) Miloš Vujanić – Crvena zvezda (1999–2001); Partizan (2001–2003)
- (United States) Corey Walden – Partizan (2019–2020); Crvena zvezda (2020–2021)

The following players have played for one club in youth system career and for rival club in senior (professional) career:

- (Serbia) Petar Aranitović – Crvena zvezda (youth system), Partizan (senior team 2013–2016)
- (Serbia) Nemanja Bjelica – Partizan (youth system), Crvena zvezda (senior team 2008–2010, 2023)
- (Socialist Federal Republic of Yugoslavia) Aleksandar Đorđević – Crvena zvezda (youth system), Partizan (senior team 1983–1992)
- (Serbia) Đorđe Gagić – Crvena zvezda (youth system), Partizan (senior team 2012–2015, 2018–2019)
- (Serbia) Marko Gudurić – Partizan (youth system), Crvena zvezda (youth system and senior team 2015–2017)
- (Serbia) Nikola Janković – Crvena zvezda (youth system), Partizan (senior team 2018–2021)
- (Serbia) Stevan Jelovac – Partizan (youth system), Crvena zvezda (senior team 2010)
- (Serbia) Nikola Jovanović – Partizan (youth system), Crvena zvezda (youth system and senior team 2017–2018, 2019–2020)
- (Serbia and Montenegro) Dejan Koturović – Crvena zvezda (youth system), Partizan (senior team 1995–1997)
- (Serbia) Arijan Lakić – Crvena zvezda (youth system), Partizan (senior team 2024–present)
- (Serbia) Đorđe Majstorović – Crvena zvezda (youth system), Partizan (youth system and senior team 2016–2017)
- (Serbia and Montenegro) Vladimir Micov – Crvena zvezda (youth system), Partizan (senior team 2007)
- (Bosnia and Herzegovina) Miloš Mirković – Partizan (youth system), Crvena zvezda (senior team 2003–2004)
- (Serbia) Filip Petrušev – Partizan (youth system), Crvena zvezda (youth system and senior team 2022–2023, 2024–2025)
- (Serbia and Montenegro) Milan Preković – Partizan (youth system), Crvena zvezda (senior team 2000–2001)
- (Serbia) Nikola Radičević – Partizan (youth system), Crvena zvezda (senior team 2017–2018)
- (Serbia) Vuk Radivojević – Partizan (youth system), Crvena zvezda (senior team 2003–2007, 2009–2010, 2011–2013)
- (Serbia and Montenegro) Vladimir Radmanović – Partizan (youth system), Crvena zvezda (youth system and senior team 1997–2001)
- (Serbia) Stefan Stojačić – Partizan (youth system), Crvena zvezda (senior team 2010)
- (Socialist Federal Republic of Yugoslavia) Nenad Trunić – Partizan (youth system), Crvena zvezda (senior team 1991–1992)

The following players have played for both Crvena zvezda and Partizan in their youth system careers:

- (Serbia) Nemanja Kapetanović – Partizan than Crvena zvezda
- (Serbia) Stevan Karapandžić – Partizan than Crvena zvezda
- (North Macedonia) Aleksandar Zunzurovski – Crvena zvezda than Partizan

=== Coaches ===
The following head coaches have coached both Crvena zvezda and Partizan in their careers:

- (Federal Republic of Yugoslavia) Borislav Džaković – Partizan (1982–1984, 1994–1995); Crvena zvezda (1995–1996, 1998)
- (Serbia) Milivoje Lazić – Crvena zvezda (2012); Partizan (2020)
- (Federal Republic of Yugoslavia) Vladislav Lučić – Partizan (1985–1986, 1998–1999); Crvena zvezda (1992–1994, 1997–1998, 1999–2000)
- (Socialist Federal Republic of Yugoslavia) Aleksandar Nikolić – Partizan (1959–1960); Crvena zvezda (1971–1974)
- (Serbia) Miroslav Nikolić – Partizan (1996–1998; 2017); Crvena zvezda (2001, 2002)
- (Federal Republic of Yugoslavia) Zoran Slavnić – Partizan (1984–1985); Crvena zvezda (1988–1991, 1994–1995)
- (Montenegro) Duško Vujošević – Partizan (1986–1989, 1990–1991, 2001–2010, 2012–2015); Crvena zvezda (1991–1992)
- (Federal Republic of Yugoslavia) Ranko Žeravica – Partizan (1971–1974, 1976–1978, 1995–1996); Crvena zvezda (1980–1986, 1996–1997)

The following assistant coaches have coached both Crvena zvezda and Partizan in their careers:

- (Federal Republic of Yugoslavia) Predrag Jaćimović – Partizan (1999–2000); Crvena zvezda (2003)
- (Serbia) Bogdan Karaičić – Crvena zvezda (2020); Partizan (2021–2025)
- (Serbia) Milivoje Karalejić – Partizan (1992–1994, 1998–1999); Crvena zvezda (2008–2009)
- (Serbia) Milivoje Lazić – Partizan (2010–2011); Crvena zvezda (2011–2012)
- (Federal Republic of Yugoslavia) Veselin Matić – Crvena zvezda (1993–1994); Partizan (1994–1996)
- (Serbia) Saša Nikitović – Partizan (2004–2005); Crvena zvezda (2005–2008)
- (Serbia) Vladan Radonjić – Partizan (2008–2010, 2011–2012, 2020–2021); Crvena zvezda (2022–present)
- (Federal Republic of Yugoslavia) Marin Sedlaček – Crvena zvezda (1988–1991, 1992–1993); Partizan (1999)
- (Socialist Federal Republic of Yugoslavia) Dejan Srzić – Partizan (1989–1990); Crvena zvezda (1990–1992)
- (Federal Republic of Yugoslavia) Petronije Zimonjić – Crvena zvezda (1992–1994, 2010–2011); Partizan (2000–2006)
- (Serbia) Predrag Zimonjić – Crvena zvezda (2002–2003); Partizan (2021–present)
- (Serbia) Milan Minić – Partizan (2018); Crvena zvezda (2025–2026)

The following youth coaches have coached both Crvena zvezda and Partizan in their careers:

- (Federal Republic of Yugoslavia) Vladimir Bošnjak – Partizan (1987–1990); Crvena zvezda (1997–1998)
- (Federal Republic of Yugoslavia) Saša Jakovljević – Crvena zvezda (N/A); Partizan (N/A)
- (Federal Republic of Yugoslavia) Aleksandar Lukman – Partizan (1995–1996); Crvena zvezda (N/A)

=== Others ===
The following individuals have also played and/or coached both Crvena zvezda and Partizan in their careers:

- (Socialist Federal Republic of Yugoslavia) Strahinja Alagić – Partizan (1946 player), Crvena zvezda (1947–1951 player; 1976 coach)
- (Serbia and Montenegro) Jovica Antonić – Partizan (1982–1983 player), Crvena zvezda (1998–1999 coach)
- (Socialist Federal Republic of Yugoslavia) Borislav Ćurčić – Crvena zvezda (1950–1955 player), Partizan (1958–1965 player; 1965–1967 coach)
- (Serbia and Montenegro) Zoran Krečković – Partizan (1977–1978 player), Crvena zvezda (2001–2002 coach)
- (Serbia) Svetislav Pešić – Partizan (1967–1971 player), Crvena zvezda (2008–2009, 2011–2012 coach)
- (Socialist Federal Republic of Yugoslavia) Borislav Stanković – Crvena zvezda (1946–1948 player), Partizan (1950–1953 player–coach)
- (Socialist Federal Republic of Yugoslavia) Miodrag Stefanović – Crvena zvezda (1946 player), Partizan (1953 coach)
- (Serbia) Oliver Stević – Crvena zvezda (2009–2010 player), Partizan (2026–present, assistant coach)

== Records ==
=== Top scorers ===
The following players recorded more than or equal to 40 points in a game between Crvena zvezda and Partizan.

Points	Player	Team	Result	Date	Ref.
59	(Socialist Federal Republic of Yugoslavia) Ljubodrag Simonović	Crvena zvezda	Partizan won, 93–88	21. March 1976	
45	(Socialist Federal Republic of Yugoslavia) Borislav Ćurčić	Crvena zvezda	Partizan won, 82–75	10. July 1955	
45	(Socialist Federal Republic of Yugoslavia) Dražen Dalipagić	Partizan	Partizan won, 92–89	22. January 1977	
44	(Socialist Federal Republic of Yugoslavia) Miloš Bojović	Partizan	Partizan won, 109–91	14. July 1963	
44	(Socialist Federal Republic of Yugoslavia) Dražen Dalipagić	Partizan	Partizan won, 102–86	13. February 1982	
43	(United States) Fred House	Partizan	Crvena zvezda won, 105–99	26. December 2003	
42	(Socialist Federal Republic of Yugoslavia) Nebojša Ilić	Crvena zvezda	Crvena zvezda won, 97–94	2. February 1993	
41	(Socialist Federal Republic of Yugoslavia) Dražen Dalipagić	Partizan	Partizan won, 113–90	9. November 1977	
41	(Serbia and Montenegro) Saša Obradović	Crvena zvezda	Partizan won, 104–102	6. March 1994	
40	(Socialist Federal Republic of Yugoslavia) Dragan Kićanović	Partizan	Crvena zvezda won, 102–100	24. September 1974	
40	(Serbia) Milan Gurović	Crvena zvezda	Partizan won, 91–89	17. June 2007	

== Honours ==
The rivalry reflected in Eternal derby matches comes about as Crvena zvezda and Partizan are the most successful basketball clubs in Serbia.

Crvena zvezda	Competition	Partizan
Domestic Leagues
12	Yugoslavia (defunct)	5
3	Serbia–Montenegro (defunct)	8
9	Serbia	9
24	Aggregate	22
Domestic Cups and Super Cups
3	Yugoslav Cup (defunct)	8
1	Yugoslav Super Cup (defunct)	—
12	Radivoj Korać Cup	8
16	Aggregate	16
Adriatic
7	League	8
1	Supercup	1
8	Aggregate	9
European
—	EuroLeague	1
1	FIBA Saporta Cup (defunct)	—
—	FIBA Korać Cup (defunct)	3
1	Aggregate	4
49	Total Aggregate	51

== See also ==
- Budućnost–Crvena Zvezda basketball rivalry
- Eternal derby (Serbia) - Crvena zvezda–Partizan football rivalry
- List of sports rivalries
