= Manović =

Manović is a surname. People with the surname include:

- Jovan Manović, a Croatian basketball player
- Mihajlo Manović, a Serbian-Croatian basketball coach and player
