= Dalvin =

Dalvin may refer to:

- Dalvin Cook (born 1995), American football running back
- Dalvin DeGrate (born 1971), American R&B and soul musician, singer and rapper, best known for his days as Mr. Dalvin, one-quarter of the R&B group Jodeci
- Dalvin Tomlinson (born 1994), American football player
- KK Dalvin, basketball club from Split, Croatia
