= Zimonjić =

Zimonjić is a Serbian surname. It may refer to:

- Bogdan Zimonjić (1813–1909), Serbian priest and vojvoda
- Nenad Zimonjić (born 1976), Serbian tennis player
- Predrag Zimonjić (born 1970), Serbian water polo player
- Petar Zimonjić (1866–1941), Serbian Orthodox bishop
- Petronije Zimonjić (1942–2021), Serbian basketball strength and conditioning coach
- Saša Zimonjić (born 1978), Serbian professional footballer

== See also ==
- Vojvoda Zimonić, village in Serbia
