= Milutin Minja =

Yugoslav basketball player and coach

Career information
- Playing career: 1952–1960
- Position: Shooting guard
- Number: 9

Career history

Playing
- 1952: Radnički Zrenjanin
- 1952–1957: Proleter Zrenjanin
- 1957–1960: Crvena zvezda

Coaching
- 1973–1974: Vojvodina (Men's team)
- 1973–1974: Vojvodina (Women's team)

Career highlights
- As player: Yugoslav League champion (1956)
Medals
Men's basketball
Representing Yugoslavia
Mediterranean Games
Gold medal – first place	1959 Lebanon	Team
Balkan Basketball Championship
Silver medal – second place	1959 Romania	Team

Milutin Minja (Serbian Cyrillic: Милутин Миња) was a Yugoslav basketball player and coach. He represented the Yugoslavia national basketball team internationally.

== Playing career ==
Minja started his basketball career with Radnički Kristal from Zrenjanin. In 1953, he signed for a Zrenjanin-based team Proleter.

During his stint with Proleter, Minja won the National Championships in the 1956 season. Minja was a part of the group of players known as the Proleter's Five, which included himself, Lajos Engler, Ljubomir Katić, Dušan Radojčić, and Vilmos Lóczi.

In 1957, Minja moved to a Belgrade powerhouse Crvena zvezda where he played for two seasons. In the 1958 season, Minja averaged 12.9 points per game while appearing in 15 games. In the 1959 season, he averaged 13.4 points per game while appearing in 17 games. In 1960, he got two-year suspension after had got caught smuggling on the Poland tour.

== National team career ==
Minja was a member of the Yugoslavia national team that participated at the 1955 FIBA European Championship in Budapest, Hungary. Over nine tournament games, he averaged 6.5 points per game. At the 1957 FIBA European Championship in Sofia, Bulgaria, he averaged 10.9 points per game over nine tournament games. At the 1959 FIBA European Championship in Istanbul, Turkey, he averaged 9.7 points per game over six tournament games.

Minja was a member of the national team that won the gold medal at the 1959 Mediterranean Games in Lebanon.

== Coaching career ==
Minja coached both Vojvodina men's and women's team from Novi Sad during 1970s.

== Career achievements and awards ==
- Yugoslav League champion: 1 (with Proleter Zrenjanin: 1956).
- Plaque of the Basketball Federation of Serbia (2016, posthumous)

== In popular culture ==
- The 2016 Serbian documentary, Šampioni iz pedeset i šeste (transl. The 1956 Champions), portrays Minja and the achievements of the Proleter basketball team in the mid 1950s and how they won the Yugoslav Championship in 1956.
