= 1976–77 Yugoslav First Basketball League =

- League: Yugoslav First Basketball League
- Sport: Basketball

1976-77
- Season champions: (Socialist Republic of Croatia) Jugoplastika

Yugoslav First Basketball League seasons
- ← 1975–76 1977–78 →

The 1976–77 Yugoslav First Basketball League season was the 33rd season of the Yugoslav First Basketball League, the highest professional basketball league in SFR Yugoslavia.

== Notable events ==
=== Dalipagić knocking out assistant coach Vlade Đurović ===
Week 13 of the league season, played on 15 January 1977, featured an ill-tempered contest at SC Šumice between the home team, OKK Beograd (playing under their sponsor's name, Beko), and cross-town visitors KK Partizan. Involved in a title chase, league-leaders Partizan (sharing a spot at the top of the table with KK Bosna, both with an 11–1 record) came to Šumice looking for an away win against mid-table opposition OKK Beograd with a 7–5 record. However, OKK managed an upset 89–85 win in a game that featured no shortage of physicality and verbal antagonism between the two sets of players and even respective coaching staffs.

The game-long duel between Partizan's star shooting guard Dragan Kićanović and OKK's Nikolić continued after the game as Kićanović punched Nikolić while the players were leaving the court, causing mass confrontation as players began pushing and shoving. Among the fracas, OKK's assistant coach Vlade Đurović aggressively ran up on Kićanović, seemingly in an effort of assaulting him in response for his earlier punch of Nikolić, at which point Kićanović's teammate Dražen Dalipagić got involved, punching, and effectively knocking out, Đurović who ended up on the floor.

== Teams ==
(Socialist Republic of Croatia) SR Croatia

- Cibona
- Industromontaža
- Kvarner
- Jugoplastika
- Zadar

(Socialist Republic of Serbia) SR Serbia

- Beko Beograd
- Crvena Zvezda
- Metalac Valjevo
- Partizan
- Radnički Belgrade

(Socialist Republic of Bosnia and Herzegovina) SR Bosnia and Herzegovina

- Bosna
- Igman Ilidža

(Socialist Republic of Macedonia) SR Macedonia

- Rabotnički

(Socialist Republic of Slovenia) SR Slovenia

- Brest Olimpija

== Classification ==
| | Regular season ranking 1976-77 | G | V | P | PF | PS | Pt |
|---|---|---|---|---|---|---|---|
| 1. | Jugoplastika | 26 | 23 | 3 | 2647 | 2252 | 46 |
| 2. | Bosna | 26 | 23 | 3 | 2549 | 2257 | 46 |
| 3. | Partizan | 26 | 22 | 4 | 2649 | 2456 | 44 |
| 4. | Cibona | 26 | 16 | 10 | 2193 | 2186 | 32 |
| 5. | Beko Beograd | 26 | 15 | 11 | 2478 | 2451 | 30 |
| 6. | Crvena Zvezda | 26 | 15 | 11 | 2416 | 2267 | 30 |
| 7. | Radnički Belgrade | 26 | 13 | 13 | 2401 | 2287 | 26 |
| 8. | Kvarner | 26 | 12 | 14 | 2688 | 2697 | 24 |
| 9. | Metalac Valjevo | 26 | 11 | 15 | 2199 | 2382 | 22 |
| 10. | Brest Olimpija | 26 | 9 | 17 | 2445 | 2403 | 18 |
| 11. | Zadar | 26 | 9 | 17 | 2219 | 2309 | 18 |
| 12. | Rabotnički | 26 | 8 | 18 | 2268 | 2533 | 16 |
| 13. | Industromontaža | 26 | 5 | 21 | 2152 | 2394 | 10 |
| 14. | Igman Ilidža | 26 | 1 | 25 | 1911 | 2340 | 2 |

The winning roster of Jugoplastika:

- (Socialist Federal Republic of Yugoslavia) Mlađan Tudor
- (Socialist Federal Republic of Yugoslavia) Željko Jerkov
- (Socialist Federal Republic of Yugoslavia) Slobodan Bjelajac
- (Socialist Federal Republic of Yugoslavia) Branko Macura
- (Socialist Federal Republic of Yugoslavia) Ratomir Tvrdić
- (Socialist Federal Republic of Yugoslavia) Ivica Dukan
- (Socialist Federal Republic of Yugoslavia) Damir Šolman
- (Socialist Federal Republic of Yugoslavia) Duje Krstulović
- (Socialist Federal Republic of Yugoslavia) Mirko Grgin
- (Socialist Federal Republic of Yugoslavia) Mihajlo Manović
- (Socialist Federal Republic of Yugoslavia) Mladen Bratić
- (Socialist Federal Republic of Yugoslavia) Ivan Sunara
- (Socialist Federal Republic of Yugoslavia) Deni Kuvačić

Coach: (Socialist Federal Republic of Yugoslavia) Petar Skansi

== Results ==
| Home \ Away | JUG | BOS | PAR | CIB | OKK | CZV | RAD | KVA | MET | OLI | ZAD | RAB | IND | IGM |
|---|---|---|---|---|---|---|---|---|---|---|---|---|---|---|
| Jugoplastika | — | 85–100 | 117–98 | 101–77 | 94–78 | 90–85 | 90–85 | 126–104 | 89–79 | 99–91 | 94–77 | 105–83 | 107–78 | 103–66 |
| Bosna | 95–110 | — | 73–72 | 85–83 | 114–92 | 93–88 | 107–103 | 99–91 | 107–85 | 117–104 | 97–77 | 124–94 | 105–73 | 78–61 |
| Partizan | 94–92 | 89–91 | — | 104–101 | 140–111 | 91–85 | 100–98 | 118–108 | 100–87 | 117–106 | 110–107 | 111–105 | 103–98 | 133–97 |
| Cibona | 85–83 | 76–72 | 88–110 | — | 80–79 | 88–79 | 69–80 | 100–95 | 77–76 | 95–80 | 79–78 | 102–71 | 92–85 | 62–55 |
| Beko Beograd | 90–129 | 98–109 | 89–85 | 99–97 | — | 84–83 | 88–91 | 122–116 | 91–89 | 107–94 | 112–73 | 134–106 | 85–73 | 94–80 |
| Crvena Zvezda | 84–88 | 78–85 | 89–92 | 92–86 | 88–89 | — | 94–69 | 121–98 | 107–102 | 102–97 | 94–80 | 97–89 | 114–89 | 94–80 |
| Radnički Belgrade | 99–100 | 76–82 | 89–107 | 107–85 | 73–93 | 88–96 | — | 118–114 | 107–79 | 103–93 | 93–76 | 97–69 | 90–80 | 113–63 |
| Kvarner | 109–128 | 118–120 | 103–108 | 95–71 | 113–101 | 108–107 | 109–105 | — | 106–98 | 79–78 | 85–80 | 108–89 | 116–94 | 99–88 |
| Metalac Valjevo | 72–116 | 88–111 | 100–114 | 81–93 | 84–83 | 86–84 | 76–75 | 117–115 | — | 98–97 | 102–101 | 88–85 | 72–73 | 70–69 |
| Olimpija | 91–106 | 78–89 | 84–86 | 93–79 | 96–93 | 85–92 | 80–88 | 126–107 | 88–67 | — | 105–94 | 109–83 | 111–78 | 112–76 |
| Zadar | 88–89 | 88–83 | 87–92 | 74–77 | 95–83 | 77–96 | 75–73 | 111–114 | 77–78 | 85–84 | — | 98–89 | 93–87 | 84–64 |
| Rabotnički | 85–99 | 93–120 | 83–90 | 81–86 | 90–94 | 96–117 | 92–90 | 102–99 | 86–84 | 78–72 | 98–97 | — | 81–76 | 81–78 |
| Industromontaža | 87–102 | 80–101 | 95–96 | 76–83 | 77–86 | 76–80 | 90–93 | 89–86 | 71–72 | 95–85 | 76–93 | 101–103 | — | 83–74 |
| Igman Ilidža | 73–105 | 78–92 | 73–89 | 55–83 | 82–103 | 61–70 | 80–98 | 81–93 | 59–60 | 90–106 | 73–80 | 83–74 | 71–72 | — |

Source: Pearlbasket
Legend: Blue = home team win; Red = away team win.
Matches with lighter background shading were decided after overtime.

Due to a tie at the top between Jugoplastika and Bosna after the end of the regular season, the season champion was decided in a one-game playoff between the two teams at a neutral venue. The game was played in Belgrade's Hala Pionir.

== Single-game title playoff ==
Hala Pionir, Belgrade

Jugoplastika vs Bosna: 98-96

== Scoring leaders ==
1. Dražen Dalipagić (Partizan) - ___ points (34.8ppg)

== Qualification in 1977-78 season European competitions ==
FIBA European Champions Cup

- Jugoplastika (champions)

FIBA Cup Winner's Cup

- Kvarner (Cup finalist)

FIBA Korać Cup

- Bosna (2nd)
- Partizan (3rd)
- Cibona (4th)
- Beko Beograd (5th)

== Basketball Cup ==
=== Bracket ===
Eightfinals
Jugoplastika | 92
Cibona | 82
Borac Čačak | 112
Brest Olimpija | 101
Ivangrad | 88
Rabotnički | 85
Beko Belgrade | 96
Crvena zvezda | 86
Elektrokosovo | 88
Metalac | 110
Kvarner | 104
Zadar | 97
Kombinat Zrenjanin | 88
Željezničar Sarajevo | 95
Bosna
Maribor

Quarterfinals
Jugoplastika | 106
Borac Čačak | 69
Ivangrad | 81
Beko Belgrade | 125
Metalac | 77
Kvarner | 81
Željezničar Sarajevo | 84
Bosna | 93

Semifinals
Jugoplastika | 94
Beko Belgrade | 93
Kvarner | 97
Bosna | 96

Finals
Jugoplastika | 80
Kvarner | 62
