= Vilmos Lóczi =

Yugoslav basketball player

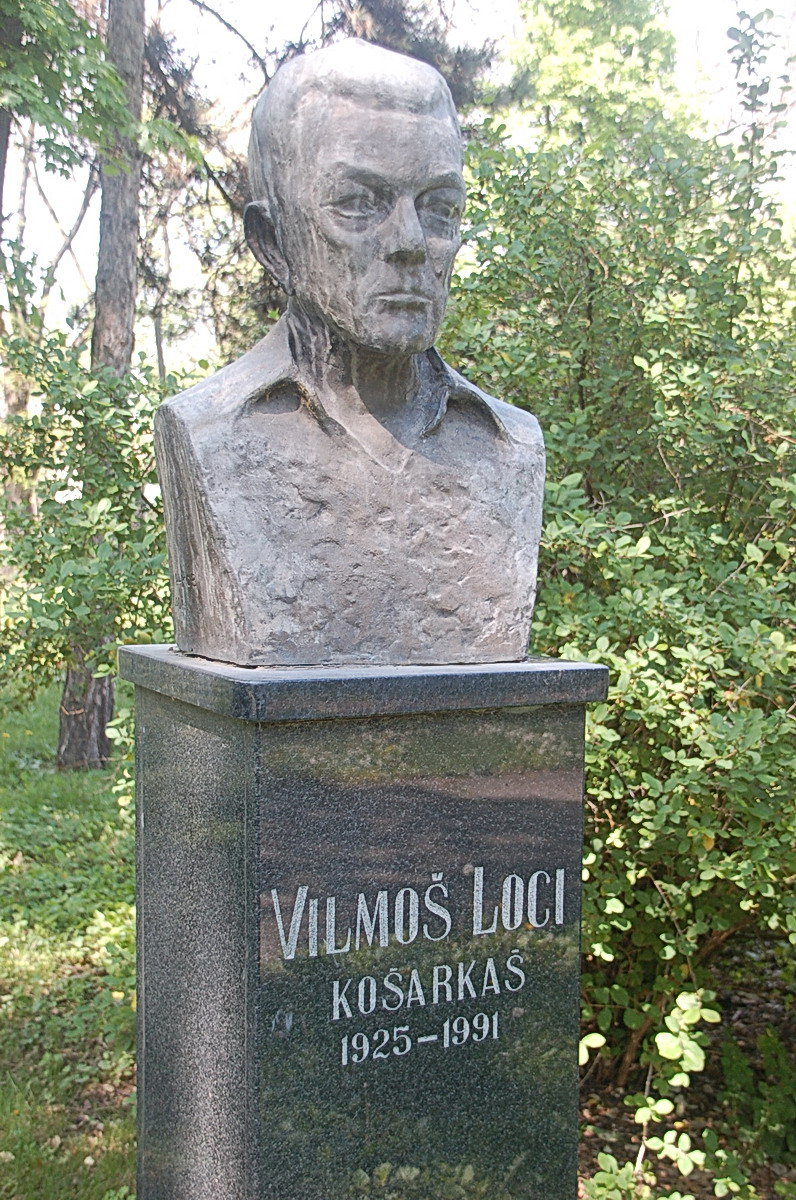
- Vilmos Lóczi bust in Zrenjanin

Personal information
- Born: 19 January 1925 Veliki Bečkerek, Kingdom of Serbs, Croats and Slovenes
- Died: 12 July 1991 (aged 66) Zrenjanin, Yugoslavia

Career information
- NBA draft: 1947: undrafted
- Playing career: 1946–1960
- Number: 6, 13

Career history

Playing
- 1946–1948: Proleter Zrenjanin
- 1949–1950: Partizan
- 1951–1960: Proleter Zrenjanin

Coaching
- Proleter Zrenjanin
- 1974–1975: Central African Republic

Career highlights
- As player: Yugoslav League champion (1956)

Vilmos Lóczi (Serbian Cyrillic: Вилмош Лоци; 19 January 1925 – 12 July 1991), also credited as Vilmoš Loci, was a Yugoslav basketball coach and player. He represented the Yugoslavia national basketball team internationally.

Lóczi was one of the best Yugoslav players from the 1940s and the 1950s according to Nebojša Popović, Aleksandar Nikolić, Ranko Žeravica and Mirko Novosel.

== Early life ==
Lóczi was born in Veliki Bečkerek to Hungarian parents from Pest. His father was a construction worker who died in Albania.

== Playing career ==
Lóczi started to play basketball for his hometown team Proleter of the Yugoslav Basketball League. In 1948, he moved to Belgrade-based team Partizan where he played until 1950. Over three seasons with Partizan, he averaged 11.7 points per game.

In 1951, Lóczi moved back to Proleter. On 19 June 1951, Lóczi played one game for Crvena zvezda at an international cup tournament in Milan, Italy. He recorded game-high 19 points in a 54–24 win over Ginnastica Roma. During his second stint with Proleter, he won the National Championships in the 1956 season. Lóczi was a part of the group of players known as the Proleter's Five, which included himself, Milutin Minja, Ljubomir Katić, Dušan Radojčić, and Lajos Engler.

In 1960, Lóczi announced his retirement from playing after Proleter got relegated from the First League.

== National team career ==
Lóczi was a member of the Yugoslavia national team that participated at the 1950 FIBA World Championship in Buenos Aires, Argentina. Over four tournament games, he averaged 7.8 points per game. The World Championship in Argentina was the inaugural tournament. At the 1953 FIBA European Championship in Moscow, the Soviet Union, he averaged 6.7 points per game over eleven tournament games.

At the 1954 FIBA World Championship in Rio de Janeiro, Brazil, Lóczi averaged 7.0 points per game over five tournament games. At the 1955 FIBA European Championship in Budapest, Hungary, he averaged 8.2 points per game over nine tournament games. On June 10, 1955, he scored a national team-high 16 points in a win over England. At the 1957 FIBA European Championship in Sofia, Bulgaria, he averaged 2.8 points per game over eight tournament games.

Lóczi is the first player who appeared in 100 games for the Yugoslavia national team. He averaged 6.7 points per game over 101 career games for the national team. Lóczi was the national team captain from 1953 to 1957.

== Coaching career ==
Lóczi began his coaching career in Proleter. Also, he coached teams in Saudi Arabia.

Lóczi was the head coach of the Central African Republic national team for two years. He led the national team at the 1974 FIBA World Championship in Puerto Rico. He also coached the United Arab Emirates national team.

== Career achievements and awards ==
- Yugoslav League champion: 1 (with Proleter Zrenjanin: 1956).
- Plaque of the Basketball Federation of Serbia (2016, posthumous)

== In popular culture ==
- In the 2015 Serbian sports drama We Will Be the World Champions Lóczi is portrayed by Ivan Zablaćanski.
- The 2016 Serbian documentary, Šampioni iz pedeset i šeste (transl. The 1956 Champions), portrays Lóczi and the achievements of the Proleter basketball team in the mid 1950s and how they won the Yugoslav Championship in 1956.

== See also ==
- * List of Yugoslav First Federal Basketball League annual scoring leaders
