= Boris Kristančič =

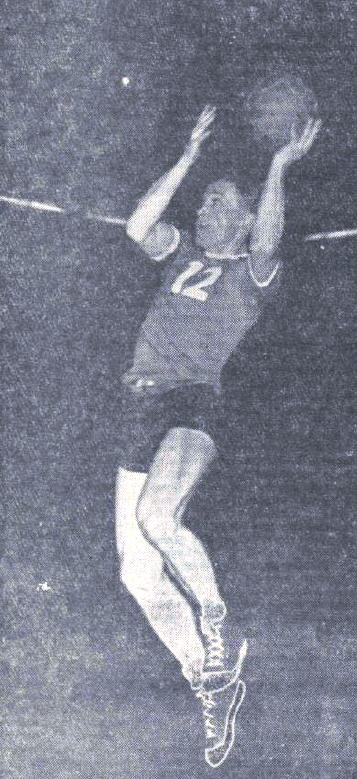
- Boris Kristančič

Personal information
- Born: 21 November 1931 Skopje, Kingdom of Yugoslavia
- Died: 29 October 2015 (aged 83) Ljubljana, Slovenia
- Listed height: 1.76 m (5 ft 9 in)
- Listed weight: 72 kg (159 lb)

Career information
- Playing career: 1949–1967
- Coaching career: ?–1967

Career history

Playing
- 1949–1961: Enotnost/AŠK Olimpija
- 1962–1967: Stella Azzura

Coaching
- ?–1967: AŠK Olimpija

Career highlights
- As player: 3x Yugoslav League champion (1957, 1959, 1961); Yugoslav League top scorer (1954); As coach: 5x Yugoslav League champion (1957, 1959, 1961, 1962, 1966)

Boris Kristančič (November 21, 1931 – October 29, 2015) was a Slovenian basketball player and coach. He represented the Yugoslavia national basketball team internationally.

== Basketball career ==
He spent most of his career at the AŠK Olimpija in Ljubljana in some cases both simultaneously as a player and as a coach during 1950s and 1960s. With his extensively assistance, the Olimpija celebrated the five of the six championship titles that they won in the framework of the Yugoslav First Basketball League.

Kristančič was the first Slovene basketball player who played for a foreign club.

He was a member (1967–1978) and the president (1978–1983) of the technical committee of Basketball Federation of Yugoslavia and the head of the organizing committee of 1970 FIBA World Championship in Ljubljana.

=== Yugoslav national team ===
He represented the Yugoslav national basketball team from 1951 to 1960 and played 81 games, also he was the captain of the team for six years. In particular with national team, he participated in the 1954 FIBA World Championship (11th) in Brazil, in two European Championships (1957 6th & 1959 9th) and in the 1960 Summer Olympics basketball tournament in Rome, Italy, where the nascent "Plavi" ranked sixth in total 16 teams.

== Personal life ==
Kristančič was born in Skopje, Kingdom of Yugoslavia (present-day North Macedonia). Beside basketball career, he was a construction engineer.

In 2001, President of Slovenia Milan Kučan honored Kristančič with an Order of Freedom of the Republic of Slovenia for "the life jubilee of fifty years working in the field of Slovenian sport, especially for merits in the development of basketball".

He died on the same day as a FIBA Hall of Fame Serbian basketball coach Ranko Žeravica.

== Career achievements and awards ==
- Yugoslav League champion: 5 (with AŠK Olimpija: 1957, 1959, 1961, 1962, 1966) as coach/player until 1961 and as coach only, until 1966.
- Yugoslav League top scorer: 1 (with Enotnost: 1954)

Other

- FIBA European Champions Cup
  - Semifinalist (with AŠK Olimpija: 1961-62)
  - Quarterfinalist (with AŠK Olimpija: 1959-60, 1962-63)
