= Lajos Engler =

Serbian basketball player (1928–2020)

- Engler with Partizan

Personal information
- Born: 20 June 1928 Bátaszék, Kingdom of Hungary
- Died: 1 May 2020 (aged 91) Zrenjanin, Serbia

Career information
- NBA draft: 1950: undrafted
- Playing career: 1946–1963
- Position: Guard
- Number: 4, 7

Career history
- 1946–1947: Proleter Zrenjanin
- 1948–1953: Partizan
- 1954–1963: Proleter Zrenjanin

Career highlights
- Yugoslav League champion (1956)

Lajos "Lala" Engler (Serbian Cyrillic: Лајош "Лала" Енглер; 20 June 1928 – 1 May 2020), also credited as Lajoš Engler, was a Hungarian-born Serbian teacher and basketball player, who represented the Yugoslavia national basketball team internationally.

== Playing career ==
Engler started to play basketball for team Proleter Zrenjanin of the Yugoslav Basketball League. In 1948, he moved to the Belgrade-based team Partizan where he played until 1953. In 1954, he moved back to Proleter.

During his second stint with Proleter he won the National Championships in the 1956 season. Engler was a part of the group of players known as the Proleter's Five, which included himself, Milutin Minja, Ljubomir Katić, Dušan Radojčić, and Vilmos Lóczi.

== National team career ==
Engler was a member of the Yugoslavia national team that participated at the 1950 FIBA World Championship in Buenos Aires, Argentina. Over three tournament games, he averaged 1.0 point per game. The World Championship in Argentina was the inaugural tournament. At the 1953 FIBA European Championship in Moscow, the Soviet Union, he averaged 6.5 points per game over eight tournament games. At the 1954 FIBA World Championship in Rio de Janeiro, Brazil, he averaged 5.8 points per game over five tournament games. At the 1957 FIBA European Championship in Sofia, Bulgaria, he averaged 4.8 points per game over nine tournament games.

Engler played 78 games for the national team.

== Post-playing career ==
After retirement, Engler worked as a teacher of German language in the Zrenjanin Grammar School.

Engler died on 1 May 2020 in Zrenjanin.

== Career achievements and awards ==
- Yugoslav League champion: 1 (with Proleter Zrenjanin: 1956).
- Lifetime Achievement Award, awarded by the Zrenjanin City Sports Association (2017)
- Plaque of the Basketball Federation of Serbia (2016)

== In popular culture ==
- In the 2015 Serbian sports drama We Will Be the World Champions Engler is portrayed by Lazar Jovanov.
- The 2016 Serbian documentary, Šampioni iz pedeset i šeste (transl. The 1956 Champions), portrays Engler and the achievements of the Proleter basketball team in the mid 1950s and how they won the Yugoslav Championship in 1956.
