= Marjan Kandus =

Slovenian basketball player (1931–2024)

Personal information
- Born: 23 September 1931 Maribor, Drava Banovina, Kingdom of Yugoslavia (modern-day Slovenia)
- Died: November 2024 (aged 93)
- Listed height: 1.86 m (6 ft 1 in)
- Listed weight: 80 kg (176 lb)

Career history
- AŠK Olimpija

Career highlights
- 4× Yugoslav League champion (1957, 1959, 1961, 1962)
Medals
Men's basketball
Representing Yugoslavia
EuroBasket
Silver medal – second place	1961 Yugoslavia	Team
Mediterranean Games
Gold medal – first place	1959 Lebanon	Team

Marjan Kandus (23 September 1931 – November 2024) was a Slovenian basketball player. He represented the Yugoslavia national team internationally. Kandus died in November 2024, at the age of 93.

== National team career ==
Kandus was a member of the Yugoslavia national team that competed in the men's tournament at the 1960 Summer Olympics.
