= ŽKK Maribor =

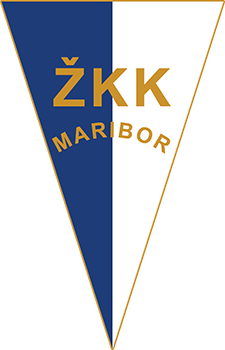
- Leagues: Yugoslav First League (1955); Yugoslav 1. B League (1985–1987)
- Founded: 1946; 80 years ago
- Dissolved: 2006; 20 years ago
- Arena: Tabor Hall (Capacity: 3,261)
- Location: Maribor, Slovenia
- Team colors: Blue, white
Home	Away

Železničarski košarkarski klub Maribor, commonly referred to as ŽKK Maribor or simply ŽKK, was a basketball team based in Maribor, Slovenia. The club was founded in 1946 and was dissolved after the 2005–06 season due to financial difficulties.

== History ==
The club was founded in 1946 as a basketball section of SŠD Železničar. It won its first Slovenian title in 1949 and renamed as ŽKK Maribor in 1954. They played in the Yugoslav First Federal Basketball League the following year, but were relegated with only one win and finished in the last place. In the 1970s, ŽKK also played in the Yugoslav Second League and later renamed as Tima MTT. Under this name, they played in the Yugoslav 1. B League from 1985 until 1987, when the club merged with city rivals KK Branik to form KK Maribor 87 as a new city team. The latter played in the Yugoslav 1. B League, but after Slovenia's independence in 1991 it disintegrated back to ŽKK and Branik. ŽKK played mostly in the second and third divisions until 2005–06, when the club went bankrupt.
