= Mihajlo Manović =

Serbian-Croatian basketball coach and player

Personal information
- Born: 4 April 1948 (age 78) Belgrade, PR Serbia, FPR Yugoslavia
- Listed height: 1.80 m (5 ft 11 in)

Career information
- NBA draft: 1970: undrafted
- Playing career: 1966–N/A
- Position: Point guard

Career history
- 1966–1967: Radnički Beograd
- 1967–1977: Split / Jugoplastika
- Dalvin

Career highlights
- As player: 2× FIBA Korać Cup winner (1976, 1977); 2× Yugoslav League champion (1971, 1977); 3× Yugoslav Cup winner (1972, 1974, 1977)
Medals
Men's basketball
Representing Yugoslavia
European Championship for Juniors
Silver medal – second place	1966 Italy	Team
Silver medal – second place	1968 Spain	Team

Mihajlo Manović (Serbian Cyrillic: Михајло Мановић; born 4 April 1948) is a Serbian–Croatian former professional basketball coach and player.

== Playing career ==
Manović played the majority of his career with Jugoplastika, most notably winning the 1970–71 and 1976–77 national league titles. Intercontinentally, Manović finished second in the 1971–72 FIBA European Champions Cup and 1972–73 FIBA European Cup Winners' Cup and won back-to-back FIBA Korać Cup titles in 1975–76 and 1976–77.

== National team career ==
In August 1966, Manović was a member of the Yugoslavia junior team that won a silver medal at the European Championship for Junior Men in Porto San Giorgio, Italy. Over four tournament games, he averaged 1.3 points per game. To years later, in August 1968, he was a member of the junior national team that a silver medal at the same championship in Vigo, Spain. Over six tournament games, he averaged 5.6 points per game.

== Personal life ==
In May 2007, his son Jovan (also a professional basketball player) was murdered in Belgrade, Serbia.
