= Miha Lokar =

Slovenian basketball player

Personal information
- Born: 10 September 1935 (age 91) Celje, Drava Banovina, Kingdom of Yugoslavia
- Listed height: 1.82 m (6 ft 0 in)
- Listed weight: 76 kg (168 lb)

Career history
- AŠK Olimpija

Career highlights
- 5× Yugoslav League champion (1957, 1959, 1961, 1962, 1966)
Medals
Men's basketball
Representing Yugoslavia
EuroBasket
Silver medal – second place	1961 Yugoslavia	Team

Miha Lokar (born 10 September 1935) is a Slovenian former basketball player. He represented the Yugoslavia national basketball team internationally. Lokar was a member of the Yugoslavia national team that competed in the men's tournament at the 1960 Summer Olympics.
