= Ivica Dukan =

Croatian basketball player (born 1956)

Chicago Bulls
- Title: Director of International Scouting; Special Assistant to General Manager
- League: NBA

Personal information
- Born: September 27, 1956 (age 70) Split, PR Croatia, FPR Yugoslavia
- Listed height: 1.95 m (6 ft 5 in)

Career information
- Playing career: 1973–1990
- Position: Shooting guard

Career history
- 1973–1974: Solin
- 1974–1986: Jugoplastika
- 1988–1990: Crystal Palace

Career highlights
- 2× FIBA Korać Cup winner (1976, 1977); Yugoslav League champion (1977); Yugoslav Cup winner (1977)
Medals
Men's basketball
Representing Yugoslavia
Mediterranean Games
Silver medal – second place	1979 Yugoslavia	Team

Ivica Dukan (born September 27, 1956), also known in the United States by his nickname Duke, is a Croatian basketball scout and former player who is currently the Director of International Scouting and Special Assistant to General Manager for the Chicago Bulls of the National Basketball Association (NBA).

== Playing career ==
Dukan scored the first three-point field goal in the Yugoslav League after introduction this rule prior to the 1984–85 season.

Dukan played 55 games on the Yugoslavian national basketball team. He represented Yugoslavia at the 1979 Mediterranean Games in Split, Yugoslavia.

== Post-playing career ==
Since 1991 Dukan has been affiliated to the Chicago Bulls organization. In 1991 he served as a part-time scout for Vice President of Basketball Operations Jerry Krause. On August 20, 1992, he began his role as first Supervisor of European Scouting. Later, he was Director of International Scouting. In 2013, he is promoted to the Special Assistant to the Bulls General Manager Gar Forman.

== Personal life ==
He and his wife Gordana have a son, Duje (born 1991), who is a professional basketball player. He is the first Croatian who met with 44th President of the United States Barack Obama.

== Awards and accomplishments ==
- FIBA Korać Cup winner: 2 (with Jugoplastika: 1975–76, 1976–77)
- Yugoslav League champion: 1 (with Jugoplastika: 1976–77)
- Yugoslav Cup winner: 1 (with Jugoplastika: 1976–77)
