= Ljubomir Katić =

Serbian basketball player and coach (1934–2025)

Personal information
- Born: 25 April 1934 Veliki Bečkerek, Kingdom of Yugoslavia
- Died: 10 March 2025 (aged 90)
- Listed height: 1.88 m (6 ft 2 in)

Career information
- Playing career: 1952–1964
- Positions: Power forward, center
- Number: 3, 10, 12
- Coaching career: 1960–1979

Career history

Playing
- 1952: Radnički Zrenjanin
- 1953–1957: Proleter Zrenjanin
- 1958: Crvena zvezda
- 1959–1963: Proleter Zrenjanin
- 1964: Split

Coaching
- Proleter Zrenjanin
- 1975–1979: Čelik Zenica

Career highlights
- As player: Yugoslav League champion (1956)

Ljubomir "Ljuba" Katić (Serbian Cyrillic: Љубомир "Љуба" Катић; 25 April 1934 – 10 March 2025) was a Serbian basketball player and coach. He represented the Yugoslavia national basketball team internationally.

== Playing career ==
Katić started his basketball career with Partizan Zrenjanin. Later, he moved to another Zrenjanin-based team Radnički Kristal.

In autumn 1952, Katić joined Proleter Zrenjanin. On 22 May 1953, he made his professional debut for Proleter in a 54–52 loss to Crvena zvezda. During his first stint with Proleter he won the Yugoslav Championship in the 1956 season. Katić was a part of the group of players known as the Proleter's Five, which included himself, Milutin Minja, Lajos Engler, Dušan Radojčić, and Vilmos Lóczi.

During the 1958 season, Katić played for Crvena zvezda from Belgrade. He moved to the Zvezda together with Minja. After one season in Belgrade, he moved back to Zrenjanin. During his second stint with Proleter, he was a player-coach together with Lóczi. Katić played for Proleter until 1964 when he moved to Split, SR Croatia, with his family. There he joined Split, a team coached by Branko Radović, his teammate in the Zvezda. On 26 April 1964, Katić he made his debut for Split in a 65–63 loss to Partizan. Split debuted in the Yugoslav First Federal League in that season.

== National team career ==
Katić was a member of the Yugoslavia national team that participated at the 1955 European Championships in Budapest, Hungary. Over five tournament games, he averaged 2.0 points per game. Also, he was a member of the national team that participated at the 1957 European Championships in Sofia, Bulgaria. Over nine tournament games, he averaged 4.4 points per game.

Katić played 29 games for the national team and averaged 3.4 points per game.

== Coaching career ==
Katić started his coaching career during the second playing stint with Proleter Zrenjanin when he was a player-coach. After retirement from playing career, he was just a coach. In 1975, Katić became the head coach for Čelik Zenica. Four years later, he left Čelik.

== Death ==
Katić died on 10 March 2025, at the age of 90.

== Career achievements and awards ==
- Yugoslav League champion: 1 (with Proleter Zrenjanin: 1956).
- Plaque of the Basketball Federation of Serbia (2016)

== In popular culture ==
- The 2016 Serbian documentary, Šampioni iz pedeset i šeste (transl. The 1956 Champions), portrays Katić and the achievements of the Proleter basketball team in the mid 1950s and how they won the Yugoslav Championship in 1956.
