= Dušan Radojčić =

Serbian basketball player

Personal information
- Born: 1931 Yugoslavia
- Died: 5 May 1999 (aged 67–68) Yugoslavia
- Position: Guard
- Number: 13

Career history

Playing
- 1949–1951: Proleter Zrenjanin
- 1952: Partizan
- 1953–?: Proleter Zrenjanin

Coaching
- Kombinat Zrenjanin
- Mašinac Zrenjanin
- Plastika

Career highlights
- As player: Yugoslav League champion (1956)

Dušan Radojčić (Serbian Cyrillic: Душан Радојчић; 1931 – 5 May 1999), was a Serbian basketball player and coach. He represented the Yugoslavia national basketball team internationally.

== Playing career ==
Radojčić spent most of his playing career with Proleter Zrenjanin of the Yugoslav Basketball League. He played the 1952 season for a Belgrade-based team Partizan.

During his second stint with Proleter he won the National Championships in the 1956 season. Radojčić was a part of the group of players known as the Proleter's Five, which included himself, Milutin Minja, Ljubomir Katić, Lajos Engler, and Vilmos Lóczi.

== National team career ==
Radojčić was a member of the Yugoslavia national team that participated at the 1950 FIBA World Championship in Buenos Aires, Argentina. He played one game at the tournament and scored 2 points.

== Coaching career ==
Radojčić coached Zrenjanin-based teams Kombinat and Mašinac, as well as Žitište-based team Plastika.

== Career achievements and awards ==
- Yugoslav League champion: 1 (with Proleter Zrenjanin: 1956).
- Plaque of the Basketball Federation of Serbia (2016, posthumous)

== Personal life ==
Radojčić briefly played handball for the Proleter handball team in 1949. His son Dragan played basketball.

== In popular culture ==
- The 2016 Serbian documentary Šampioni iz pedeset i šeste (transl. The 1956 Champions) portrays Radojčić and the achievements of the Proleter basketball team in the mid 1950s and how they won the Yugoslav Championship in 1956.
