= 1977–78 Yugoslav First Basketball League =

- League: Yugoslav First Basketball League
- Sport: Basketball

1977-78
- Season champions: (Socialist Republic of Bosnia and Herzegovina) Bosna

Yugoslav First Basketball League seasons
- ← 1976–77 1978–79 →

The 1977–78 Yugoslav First Basketball League season was the 34th season of the Yugoslav First Basketball League, the highest professional basketball league in SFR Yugoslavia.

== Teams ==
(Socialist Republic of Serbia) SR Serbia

- Beko Beograd
- Borac Čačak
- Crvena Zvezda
- Metalac Valjevo
- Partizan
- Radnički Belgrade

(Socialist Republic of Croatia) SR Croatia

- Cibona
- Dalvin
- Kvarner
- Jugoplastika
- Zadar

(Socialist Republic of Bosnia and Herzegovina) SR Bosnia and Herzegovina

- Bosna

(Socialist Republic of Macedonia) SR Macedonia

- Rabotnički

(Socialist Republic of Slovenia) SR Slovenia

- Brest Olimpija

== Classification ==
	Regular season ranking 1977-78	G	V	P	PF	PS	Pt
1.	Bosna	26	23	3	2669	2391	46
2.	Partizan	26	21	5	2872	2641	42
3.	Jugoplastika	26	19	7	2566	2298	38
4.	Brest Olimpija	26	18	8	2544	2368	36
5.	Cibona	26	14	12	2444	2355	28
6.	Zadar	26	13	13	2553	2515	26
7.	Radnički Belgrade	26	13	13	2478	2509	26
8.	Crvena Zvezda	26	12	14	2396	2452	24
9.	Metalac Valjevo	26	11	15	2271	2262	22
10.	Borac Čačak	26	11	15	2636	2767	22
11.	Kvarner	26	11	15	2392	2436	22
12.	Beko Beograd	26	9	17	2409	2553	18
13.	Rabotnički	26	6	20	2309	2460	12
14.	Dalvin	26	1	25	2281	2813	2

The winning roster of Bosna:

- (Socialist Federal Republic of Yugoslavia) Rođeni Krvavac
- (Socialist Federal Republic of Yugoslavia) Anto Đogić
- (Socialist Federal Republic of Yugoslavia) Predrag Benaček
- (Socialist Federal Republic of Yugoslavia) Boško Bosiočić
- (Socialist Federal Republic of Yugoslavia) Nihad Izić
- (Socialist Federal Republic of Yugoslavia) Ratko Radovanović
- (Socialist Federal Republic of Yugoslavia) Mladen Ostojić
- (Socialist Federal Republic of Yugoslavia) Žarko Varajić
- (Socialist Federal Republic of Yugoslavia) Mirza Delibašić
- (Socialist Federal Republic of Yugoslavia) Dragan Zrno
- (Socialist Federal Republic of Yugoslavia) Sabit Hadžić
- (Socialist Federal Republic of Yugoslavia) Svetislav Pešić
- (Socialist Federal Republic of Yugoslavia) Sabahudin Bilalović
- (Socialist Federal Republic of Yugoslavia) Sulejman Duraković

Coach: (Socialist Federal Republic of Yugoslavia) Bogdan Tanjević

== Results ==
Home \ Away	BOS	PAR	JUG	OLI	CIB	ZAD	RAD	CZV	MET	BOR	KVA	OKK	RAB	DAL
Bosna	—	102–107	92–84	122–104	90–92	93–87	110–88	99–88	88–73	119–107	114–89	84–77	107–83	106–95
Partizan	102–109	—	96–99	103–100	114–100	117–100	99–97	96–93	97–94	121–97	114–99	116–98	115–104	125–95
Jugoplastika	108–114	77–74	—	83–81	105–91	110–97	104–90	107–92	77–74	128–79	95–76	110–85	97–90	113–77
Olimpija	80–76	92–96	83–80	—	93–85	106–97	109–88	101–77	84–71	103–90	102–95	89–69	93–80	123–96
Cibona	89–92	107–108	93–92	106–97	—	100–85	94–82	100–78	94–82	111–93	121–96	102–82	87–89	90–83
Zadar	101–107	106–108	110–85	95–91	88–74	—	90–96	119–101	105–87	89–86	97–92	134–108	83–81	109–74
Radnički Belgrade	104–116	111–132	90–98	101–100	75–87	101–110	—	92–97	98–89	84–81	93–91	107–94	101–85	101–79
Crvena Zvezda	92–102	90–113	82–97	84–89	88–86	95–89	89–91	—	83–82	101–87	89–80	85–82	94–86	116–93
Metalac Valjevo	81–86	99–103	67–73	84–96	96–77	104–91	95–99	81–80	—	103–79	82–80	83–91	95–66	101–81
Borac Čačak	101–118	116–128	116–114	126–102	121–109	116–112	97–95	120–114	100–92	—	110–96	99–101	115–104	128–106
Kvarner	100–103	128–116	93–92	90–103	88–87	100–86	78–80	81–82	86–96	104–90	—	83–79	77–70	105–89
Beko Beograd	92–102	107–122	89–102	94–108	82–81	100–110	102–100	91–104	96–97	116–89	84–85	—	89–84	119–102
Rabotnički	84–105	131–128	91–115	85–96	72–93	100–76	89–90	96–92	73–74	103–94	83–84	85–88	—	106–82
Dalvin	83–113	90–122	76–121	95–118	84–88	83–87	94–124	92–110	79–89	94–99	79–116	90–94	90–89	—

Source: Pearlbasket
Legend: Blue = home team win; Red = away team win.
Matches with lighter background shading were decided after overtime.

== Scoring leaders ==
1. Dragan Kićanović (Partizan) - 894 points (34.4 ppg)
2. Dražen Dalipagić (Partizan) - 875 points (33.7 ppg)
3. Branko Skroče (Zadar) - 779 points (30.0 ppg)
4. Branko Kovačević (Metalac Valjevo) - 717 points (27.6 ppg)
5. Mirza Delibašić (Bosna) - 694 points (26.7 ppg)

== Qualification in 1978-79 season European competitions ==
FIBA European Champions Cup

- Bosna (champions)

FIBA Cup Winners' Cup

- Radnički Belgrade (Cup finalist)

FIBA Korać Cup

- Partizan (2nd)
- Jugoplastika (3rd)
- Brest Olimpija (4th)
- Cibona (5th)

== Basketball Cup ==
=== Bracket ===
Eightfinals
Borac Čačak	87
Rabotnički	84
Zadar	72
Jugoplastika	103
Mašinac
Banovići
Industromontaža	93
Radnički Belgrade	94
Budućnost
Brest Olimpija	87
Bosna	97
Crvena zvezda	91
Cibona	85
Celje	82
Metalac Valjevo	92

Quarterfinals
Borac Čačak	70
Jugoplastika	93
Mašinac Kraljevo	66
Radnički Belgrade	102
Budućnost	94
Bosna	122
Crvena zvezda	80
Metalac Valjevo	76

Semifinals
Jugoplastika
Radnički Belgrade
Bosna
Crvena zvezda

Finals
Radnički Belgrade	87
Bosna	98
