= Ante Grgurević =

Croatian basketball player and coach (1975–2026)

Personal information
- Born: 13 August 1975 Split, SR Croatia, SFR Yugoslavia
- Died: 15 January 2026 (aged 50)
- Listed height: 6 ft 6.75 in (2.00 m)
- Listed weight: 240 lb (109 kg)

Career information
- Playing career: 1994–2012
- Position: Head coach
- Coaching career: 2012–2026

Career history

Playing
- 1994–1995: Dalvin
- 1995–1999: Split
- 1999–2000: Lugano Tigers
- 2000–2002: Split
- 2002–2003: Air Scandone Avellino
- 2003–2004: Krka
- 2004–2005: Conad Rimini
- 2005: Split CO
- 2005: Premiata Montegranaro
- 2005–2006: Eurorida Scafati
- 2006: Aris
- 2006: Olympia Larissa
- 2006–2007: AEK Athens
- 2007: Olympia Patras
- 2009: Split
- 2010: ETHA Engomis
- 2010–2012: Split

Coaching
- 2012–2019: Split (assistant)
- 2019: Split

Career highlights
- Croatian Cup (1997); Swiss Basketball League (2000); Serie A2 Cup (2006)

Ante Grgurević (13 August 1975 – 15 January 2026) was a Croatian professional basketball coach and player.

Standing at 2.00 m (6 ft 6 3/4 in) he played the power forward, and also the small forward and center positions if needed.

== Coaching career ==
After he finished his career, Grgurević started his coaching career as an assistant coach of Split in the Croatian League, in September 2012. On 6 March 2019, Grgurević was named the head coach of Split, after head coach Vladimir Anzulović was fired due to poor results. On 24 June 2019, the club announced that Grgurević had signed a two-year deal. On 8 December 2019, he was fired.

== Death ==
Grgurević died on 15 January 2026, at the age of 50.
