= Dušan Milošević (basketball) =

Serbian basketball player

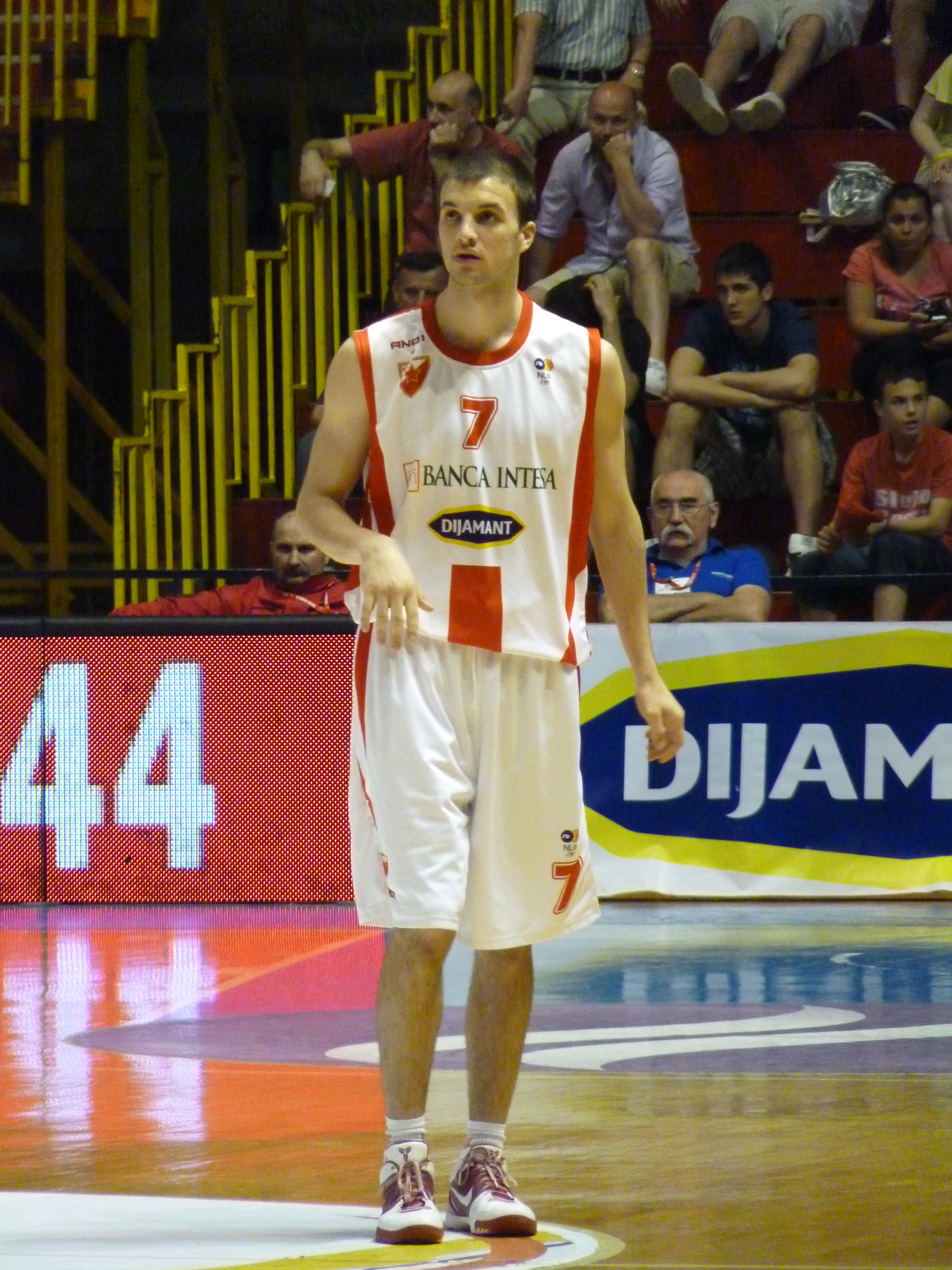
- Milošević with Crvena zvezda in 2010

Personal information
- Born: 15 April 1990 (age 36) Prokuplje, SR Serbia, Yugoslavia
- Listed height: 1.99 m (6 ft 6 in)
- Listed weight: 90 kg (198 lb)

Career information
- NBA draft: 2012: undrafted
- Playing career: 2008–present
- Position: Shooting guard / point guard
- Number: 9

Career history
- 2008–2010: Crvena zvezda Reserves
- 2010: Crvena zvezda
- 2010–2011: Ulcinj
- 2011–2012: Teodo Tivat
- 2012–2013: Ulcinj
- 2013–2014: Crnokosa
- 2014–2017: Tamiš
- 2018: OKK Beograd
- 2019–2020: KK Priboj
- 2020–2021: Radnički Beograd
- 2021–present: Proleter Naftagas

Dušan Milošević (Serbian Cyrillic: Душан Милошевић; born 15 April 1990) is a Serbian professional basketball player for Proleter Naftagas of the Second League of Serbia.

== Professional career ==
A guard, Milošević played for Crvena zvezda, Ulcinj, Teodo Tivat, Crnokosa, Tamiš, OKK Beograd, and Radnički Beograd.
