= First B Federal Basketball League =

Yugoslav First B Federal League
- Organising body: BFY
- Founded: 1980
- First season: 1980–81
- Folded: 1992
- Country: Yugoslavia
- Divisions: 2
- Level on pyramid: 2
- Feeder to: FIBA Europe
- Promotion to: Yugoslav First Federal League
- Domestic cup: Yugoslav Cup

The Yugoslav First B Federal Basketball League (Serbo-Croatian: Prva B savezna košarkaška liga) was the second-tier level club basketball league of SFR Yugoslavia. The league's top performing clubs of each season, were promoted up to the top tier level, the Yugoslav First Federal League. Until 1980 it was called Yugoslav Second Federal Basketball League.

== Winners ==
Season	West	East	Promoted		
1967-68	(Socialist Republic of Slovenia) Maribor	(Socialist Republic of Macedonia) Rabotnički	(Socialist Republic of Serbia) Borac Čačak (Socialist Republic of Macedonia) Rabotnički		
1968-69	(Socialist Republic of Slovenia) Slovan	(Socialist Republic of Serbia) Radnički			
1969-70	(Socialist Republic of Croatia) Slavonski Brod	(Socialist Republic of Serbia) Radnički			
1970-71	(Socialist Republic of Croatia) Željezničar Karlovac	(Socialist Republic of Serbia) Partizan			
1971-72	(Socialist Republic of Bosnia and Herzegovina) Bosna	(Socialist Republic of Serbia) Proleter Zrenjanin			
1972-73	(Socialist Republic of Croatia) Zrinjevac	(Socialist Republic of Serbia) Metalac Valjevo			
1973-74	(Socialist Republic of Croatia) Kvarner	(Socialist Republic of Serbia) Vojvodina			
Season	West	East	North	South	Promoted
1974-75	(Socialist Republic of Croatia) Zrinjevac	(Socialist Republic of Serbia) Mladost Zemun	(Socialist Republic of Bosnia and Herzegovina) Željezničar Sarajevo	(Socialist Republic of Montenegro) Budućnost	(Socialist Republic of Bosnia and Herzegovina) Željezničar Sarajevo (Socialist Republic of Croatia) Zrinjevac
1975-76	(Socialist Republic of Croatia) Kvarner	(Socialist Republic of Serbia) Železničar Čačak	(Socialist Republic of Bosnia and Herzegovina) Igman Ilidža	(Socialist Republic of Montenegro) Budućnost	(Socialist Republic of Croatia) Kvarner (Socialist Republic of Bosnia and Herzegovina) Igman Ilidža
1976-77	(Socialist Republic of Croatia) Dalvin	(Socialist Republic of Serbia) Borac Čačak	(Socialist Republic of Bosnia and Herzegovina) Željezničar Sarajevo	(Socialist Republic of Macedonia) Kumanovo	(Socialist Republic of Serbia) Borac Čačak (Socialist Republic of Croatia) Dalvin
1977-78	(Socialist Republic of Croatia) Zrinjevac	(Socialist Republic of Serbia) Sloga	(Socialist Republic of Bosnia and Herzegovina) Željezničar Sarajevo	(Socialist Republic of Macedonia) Kumanovo	
1978-79	(Socialist Republic of Croatia) Šibenik	(Socialist Republic of Macedonia) Rabotnički			
1979-80	(Socialist Republic of Croatia) Kvarner	(Socialist Republic of Montenegro) Budućnost			
Season	Champion				
1980–81	(Socialist Republic of Serbia) Borac Čačak				
1981–82	(Socialist Republic of Croatia) Jugoplastika				
1982–83	(Socialist Republic of Serbia) IMT				
1983–84	(Socialist Republic of Serbia) Radnički Belgrade				
Season	West	East	Ref.		
1984–85	(Socialist Republic of Slovenia) Smelt Olimpija	(Socialist Republic of Macedonia) Rabotnički			
1985–86	(Socialist Republic of Bosnia and Herzegovina) Sloboda Dita Tuzla	(Socialist Republic of Macedonia) MZT Skopje			
1986–87	(Socialist Republic of Slovenia) Smelt Olimpija	(Socialist Republic of Serbia) IMT			
1987–88	(Socialist Republic of Serbia) Vojvodina	(Socialist Republic of Serbia) Prvi partizan Užice			
1988–89	(Socialist Republic of Bosnia and Herzegovina) Sloboda Dita Tuzla	(Socialist Republic of Serbia) Zorka Šabac			
1989–90	(Socialist Republic of Croatia) Šibenka	(Socialist Republic of Montenegro) Budućnost			
1990–91	(Socialist Republic of Croatia) Oveco Zagreb	(Socialist Republic of Macedonia) Rabotnički			
Season	Champion		Ref.		
1991–92	(Socialist Republic of Serbia) Iva Šabac				

== Adriatic League successor league ==
In 2017, the ABA League, which is the successor league to the Yugoslav First Federal League, created the Adriatic League Second Division, which is the successor league to the Yugoslav First B Federal League.

== See also ==
- YUBA B League
