= Duje Dukan =

Croatian-American basketball player (born 1991)

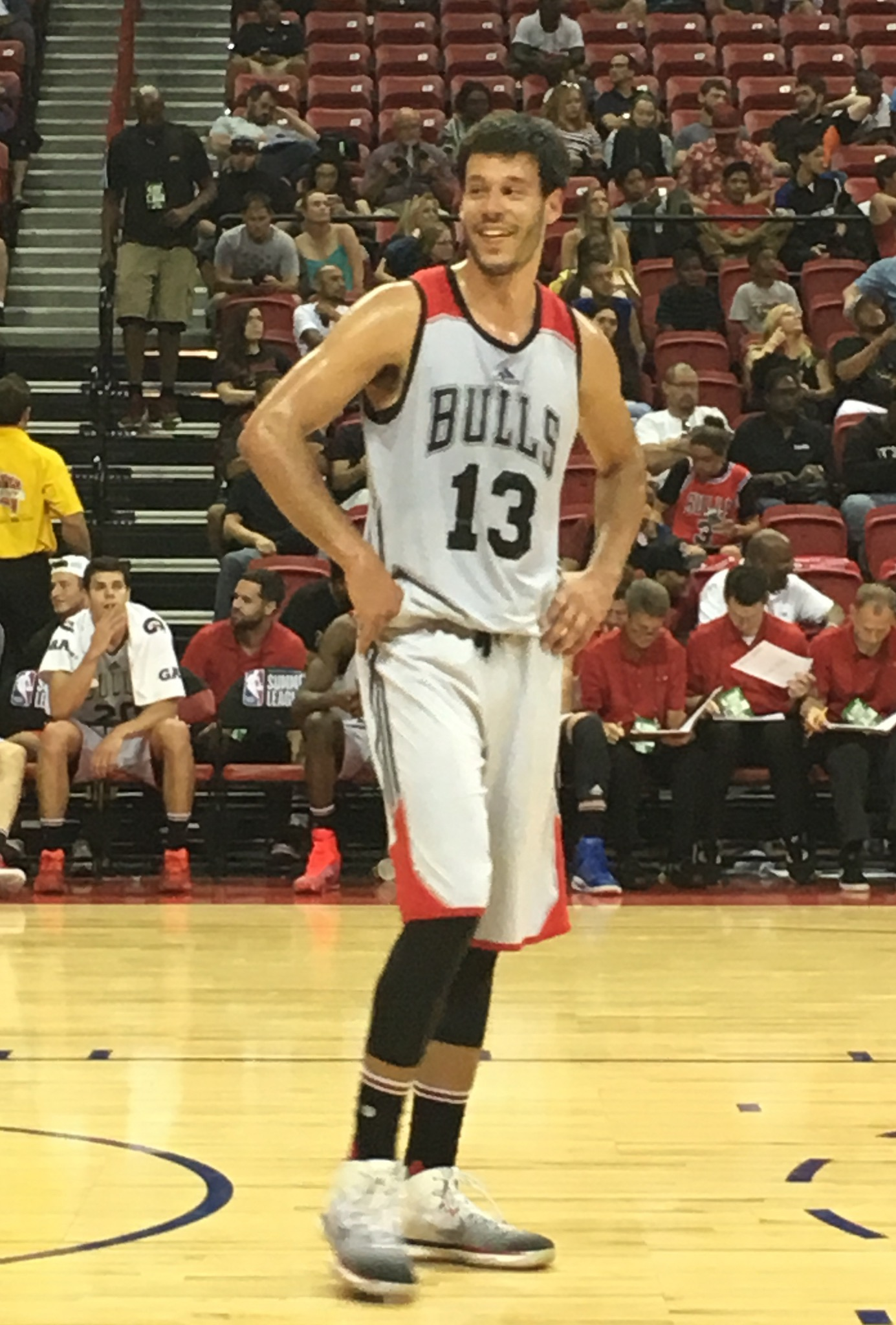

Free agent
- Position: Power forward

Personal information
- Born: 4 December 1991 (age 34) Split, Croatia
- Listed height: 6 ft 10 in (2.08 m)
- Listed weight: 218 lb (99 kg)

Career information
- High school: Deerfield (Deerfield, Illinois)
- College: Wisconsin (2010–2015)
- NBA draft: 2015: undrafted
- Playing career: 2015–present

Career history
- 2015–2016: Sacramento Kings
- 2015–2016: →Reno Bighorns
- 2016–2017: Cedevita Zagreb
- 2017–2018: Windy City Bulls
- 2018: Fort Wayne Mad Ants
- 2018: Oklahoma City Blue
- 2019: Capital City Go-Go
- 2019–2020: Estudiantes
- 2020–2021: TAU Castelló
- 2021–2022: Cáceres Ciudad del Baloncesto
- 2022–2023: Landstede Hammers
- 2024: Klosterneuburg Dukes
- Stats at NBA.com
- Stats at Basketball Reference

Duje Dukan (born 4 December 1991) is a Croatian professional basketball player who last played for the Klosterneuburg Dukes in the Austrian Basketball Bundesliga. He played college basketball for the University of Wisconsin–Madison.

== Early life ==
Dukan was born in Split, Croatia, but moved to the United States when he was 10 months old. He grew up in Deerfield, Illinois and attended Deerfield High School. During the 1990s, Dukan was a ball boy for the Chicago Bulls at the United Center. He later played college basketball for the University of Wisconsin.

== Professional career ==
=== Sacramento Kings (2015–2016) ===
After going undrafted in the 2015 NBA draft, Dukan joined the Sacramento Kings for the 2015 NBA Summer League. On 22 July 2015, he signed with the Kings. On 13 November 2015, he made his professional debut with the Reno Bighorns in a 123–121 loss to the Los Angeles D-Fenders, scoring 14 points in 34 minutes of action as a starter. During his rookie season, he received multiple assignments to the Bighorns, the Kings' D-League affiliate. In the Kings' season finale on 13 April 2016, he made his long-awaited NBA debut. In 24 minutes off the bench, he recorded six points, four rebounds, one assist and one steal in a 116–81 loss to the Houston Rockets. On 4 July 2016, he was waived by the Kings.

=== Cedevita Zagreb (2016–2017) ===
On 3 August 2016, Dukan signed a three-year deal with the Croatian team Cedevita Zagreb. Dukan left the team in January, 2017 in a mutual termination of his contract.

=== Windy City Bulls (2017–2018) ===
On January 27, 2017, Windy City Bulls of the NBA Development League acquired Dukan from the Austin Spurs.

=== Fort Wayne Mad Ants (2018) ===
On February 12, 2018, Dukan was traded by the Windy City Bulls to the Fort Wayne Mad Ants along with the returning player rights to Henry Sims in exchange for C.J. Fair.

=== 2018–19 season ===
On August 22, 2018, Dukan was selected by the Capital City Go-Go of the G League in the 2018 expansion draft. However, he was not added to their training camp roster. Instead, he was added to the Westchester Knicks training camp roster but did not make the final roster. Dukan ultimately landed with the Oklahoma City Blue in November, but was waived after three games. He signed with the Capital City Go-Go in January 2019.

=== 2019–20 season ===
On July 19, 2019, Dukan signed a one-year deal with Spanish club Movistar Estudiantes. He averaged 4.7 points and 1.8 rebounds per game in ACB play.

=== 2020–21 season ===
On August 8, 2020, Dukan signed with TAU Castelló of the LEB Oro. He averaged 6.9 points and 2.4 rebounds per game.

=== 2021–22 season ===
On October 5, 2021, Dukan signed with Cáceres Ciudad del Baloncesto of the Spanish LEB Oro.

=== 2022–23 season ===
On November 23, 2022, Dukan joined Dutch team Landstede Hammers of the BNXT League, where he replaced Ryan Davis.

== Personal life ==
His father, Ivica Dukan, played basketball professionally in Europe for 15 years and is now an international basketball scout for the Chicago Bulls.

== NBA career statistics ==
Legend
GP	Games played	GS	Games started	MPG	Minutes per game
FG%	Field goal percentage	3P%	3-point field goal percentage	FT%	Free throw percentage
RPG	Rebounds per game	APG	Assists per game	SPG	Steals per game
BPG	Blocks per game	PPG	Points per game	**Bold**	Career high

=== Regular season ===
Year	Team	GP	GS	MPG	FG%	3P%	FT%	RPG	APG	SPG	BPG	PPG
2015–16	Sacramento	1	0	24.0	.200	.400	.000	4.0	1.0	1.0	.0	6.0
Career		1	0	24.0	.200	.400	.000	4.0	1.0	1.0	.0	6.0

== See also ==
- List of European basketball players in the United States
