= Jovan Manović =

Croatian basketball player

Personal information
- Born: 13 May 1977 Split, SR Croatia, SFR Yugoslavia
- Died: 9 May 2007 (aged 29) Belgrade, Serbia
- Listed height: 1.83 m (6 ft 0 in)

Career information
- NBA draft: 1999: undrafted
- Playing career: 1995–2007
- Position: Point guard

Career history
- 2000–2002: ADO Ovarense
- 2002: Portugal Telecom
- 2003–2004: Alkar
- 2004–2005: JDA Dijon
- 2005–2006: Split CO
- 2006: Makedonikos
- 2006–2007: AS Prishtina

Jovan Manović (13 May 1977 – 9 May 2007) was a Croatian professional basketball player.

== Playing career ==
A point guard, Manović played for Split CO and Alkar in Croatia, Kraški zidar and Helios Domžale in Slovenia, Ovarense, Portugal Telecom, and C.A. Queluz in Portugal, JDA Dijon (France), AS Prishtina (Kosovo), and Makedonikos (Greece).

== Personal life ==
His parents were former basketball player Mihajlo Manović and Hanija Erceg.

=== Death ===
On 9 May 2007 around 2:10 p.m., while socializing with a party of friends on the patio of the Zodiac café-restaurant at Vase Pelagića Street in the Belgrade neighbourhood of Senjak, Manović was murdered by a gunman who walked up to his table and shot him in the chest ten times. An investigation concluded that his death was a case of mistaken identity in a clash between two Belgrade drug gangs. The hitman's actual target was a Serbian drug lord's close associate.

== See also ==
- List of basketball players who died during their careers
