= Milivoje Karalejić =

Bosnian-Serbian basketball coach and conditioning expert

- Milivoje Karalejić
- Born: November 6, 1945; Prizren, SR Serbia, FNR Yugoslavia
- Died: May 18, 2024 (aged 78); Belgrade, Serbia
- Occupations: Basketball coach, conditioning specialist, professor
- Years active: 1971-2024
- Known for: Conditioning coach, professor of basketball

Milivoje Karalejić (Serbian Cyrillic: Миливоје Каралејић; 6 November 1945 - 18 May 2024) was a Yugoslav and Serbian-Bosnian basketball coach, conditioning expert, and academic. He was widely regarded as one of the pioneers of modern conditioning training in European basketball and played a significant role in the development of generations of top Yugoslav, Serbian, and Bosnian players and coaches. Karalejić also served on coaching staffs of numerous elite clubs and national teams, contributing to multiple European and world championships with the Yugoslav national basketball team, as well as with various Yugoslav youth selections.

== Early life and education ==
Karalejić was born on 6 November 1945 in Prizren, FNR Yugoslavia. He graduated from the Faculty of Sport and Physical Education at the University of Sarajevo and later earned his doctorate with a thesis on the relationship between personality dimensions and success in basketball. Over his career he also published more than 20 scientific papers and several books in the field of basketball training.

== Coaching and conditioning career ==
Karalejić began his coaching and conditioning career at Bosna Sarajevo, where he worked from 1983 to 1990. He later became part of the staff at top European clubs, including Partizan, Crvena zvezda, Barcelona, Dynamo Moscow, Girona, Virtus Roma, and Alba Berlin. During his time with Partizan, he contributed to winning the Yugoslav Cup in 1999–2000.

Karalejić was also a longtime conditioning and support coach with the Yugoslav national basketball team for some periods, including the European Championship title in 2001 and the 2002 FIBA World Championship title. He worked alongside renowned head coaches and mentored many future stars and coaches.

Throughout his training career, Karalejić worked with many of Yugoslavia's top basketball players, including Mirza Delibašić, Ratko Radovanović, Krešimir Ćosić, Dražen Dalipagić, Željko Jerkov, Dražen Petrović, Vlade Divac, Toni Kukoč, Dino Rađa, Dejan Ilić, Aleksandar Đorđević, Dragan Kićanović, Miroslav Pecarski, Peja Stojaković, Dejan Bodiroga, Marko Jarić, Igor Rakočević, Željko Rebrača, and Milan Gurović.

== Academic and professional work ==
In addition to his coaching roles, Karalejić enjoyed a distinguished academic career. In 1971, Karalejić began working at the Faculty of Physical Culture in Sarajevo, initially as an assistant in basketball and later as a lecturer. In 1973, he became the head of the newly established Higher School for Coaches, specializing in basketball and football. Among the first students in the basketball program were future prominent coaches Bogdan Tanjević and Rusmir Halilović, followed by Svetislav Pešić in 1978, after he ended his playing career due to injury. Karalejić later becoming a lecturer and professor in Belgrade, where he taught for more than two decades.

== Legacy and impact ==
Karalejić was widely recognized as one of the earliest conditioning specialists in European basketball and mentored many players and coaches who achieved international success, including figures such as Svetislav Pešić and Željko Obradović. His scientific contributions and practical methodologies influenced basketball training practices across Europe.

== Death ==
Milivoje Karalejić died on 18 May 2024 at the age of 78. His passing was widely mourned in the basketball community across the former Yugoslavia, with tributes highlighting his foundational role in conditioning and coaching.

== Bibliography ==
=== Books ===
- Brzinsko snažna priprema košarkaša. KSBiH, 1991.
- Englesko-srpski i srpsko-engleski košarkaški rečnik. Junior, 1998. ISBN 8690172718
- Košarka. Vreme, 1998. ISBN 86-82989-02-6
- Testiranje i mjerenje u košarci. Fakultet sporta i fizičkog vaspitanja, 2000. ISBN 9958-42-037-6
- Osnove košarke. Fakultet sporta i fizičkog vaspitanja, 2001. ISBN 86-80255-19-X
- Košarkaška enciklopedija. Košarkaški savez Jugoslavije, 2001. ISBN 86-82989-03-4
- Dijagnostika u košarci. VSZS, 2009. ISBN 978-86-83593-73-6

=== Selected papers ===
- Cognitive abilities of young basketball players and their actual success. Fizička kultura, 2008, vol. 62, iss. 1–2, pp. 109–123
- Structural Analysis of Knowledge Based on Specific Attributes of the Game of Basketball. Fizička kultura, 2010, vol. 73, iss. 2, pp. 88–111.
