= 1962 Yugoslav First Basketball League =

- League: Yugoslav First Basketball League
- Sport: Basketball

1962
- Season champions: (Socialist Republic of Slovenia) Olimpija

Yugoslav First Basketball League seasons
- ← 1961 1963 →

== Teams ==
(Socialist Republic of Serbia) PR Serbia
- Crvena Zvezda
- OKK Beograd
- Partizan
- Radnički Belgrade
(Socialist Republic of Croatia) PR Croatia
- Lokomotiva
- Mladost Zagreb
- Zadar
- Željezničar Karlovac
(Socialist Republic of Bosnia and Herzegovina) PR Bosnia and Herzegovina
- Željezničar Sarajevo
(Socialist Republic of Slovenia) PR Slovenia
- Olimpija

== Classification ==
	Season ranking 1962	G	W	L	PF	PA	Pt
1.	Olimpija	18	16	2	1730	1284	32
2.	OKK Beograd	18	15	3	1682	1285	30
3.	Zadar	18	14	4	1548	1310	28
4.	Lokomotiva	18	11	7	1604	1457	22
5.	Radnički Belgrade	18	10	8	1463	1305	20
6.	Partizan	18	9	9	1565	1449	18
7.	Željezničar Karlovac	18	7	11	1323	1376	14
8.	Crvena Zvezda	18	5	13	1399	1452	10
9.	Željezničar Sarajevo	18	2	16	1187	1504	4
10.	Mladost	18	1	17	749	1828	2

The winning roster of Olimpija:

- (Socialist Federal Republic of Yugoslavia) Ivo Daneu
- (Socialist Federal Republic of Yugoslavia) Igor Jelnikar
- (Socialist Federal Republic of Yugoslavia) Matija Dermastija
- (Socialist Federal Republic of Yugoslavia) Emil Logar
- (Socialist Federal Republic of Yugoslavia) Marjan Kandus
- (Socialist Federal Republic of Yugoslavia) Karel Kapelj
- (Socialist Federal Republic of Yugoslavia) Bogdan Müller
- (Socialist Federal Republic of Yugoslavia) Miha Lokar
- (Socialist Federal Republic of Yugoslavia) Marko Vrhovec
- (Socialist Federal Republic of Yugoslavia) Peter Samaluk
- (Socialist Federal Republic of Yugoslavia) Tomo Vavpetič
- (Socialist Federal Republic of Yugoslavia) Borut Bassin
- (Socialist Federal Republic of Yugoslavia) Ivan Potočnik

Coach: (Socialist Federal Republic of Yugoslavia) Boris Kristančič

== Scoring leaders ==
1. Radivoj Korać (OKK Beograd) – ___ points (__ ppg)
2. ???
3. ???

== Basketball Cup ==
=== Bracket ===
Eightfinals
Partizan	85
Rabotnički	49
ŽKK Ljubljana	97
Zadar	26
Sloboda Tuzla
KK Željezničar Sarajevo
OKK Beograd	106
Vojvodina	56
Željezničar Karlovac	73
Olimpija	61
Crvena zvezda	68
Radnički Belgrade	66

Quarterfinals
Partizan	86
ŽKK Ljubljana	75
Sloboda Tuzla	43
KK Željezničar Sarajevo	34
OKK Beograd
Željezničar Karlovac	57
Crvena zvezda	54

Semifinals
Partizan	64
Sloboda Tuzla	63
OKK Beograd (Note: The match was not played because the Željezničar Karlovac team did not arrive in Belgrade.)	20
Željezničar Karlovac	0

Finals
Partizan	82
OKK Beograd	103

== Qualification in 1962-63 season European competitions ==
FIBA European Champions Cup

- Olimpija (champions)
