= 1961 Yugoslav First Basketball League =

- League: Yugoslav First Basketball League
- Sport: Basketball

1961
- Season champions: (Socialist Republic of Slovenia) Olimpija

Yugoslav First Basketball League seasons
- ← 1960 1962 →

== Teams ==
(Socialist Republic of Serbia) PR Serbia
- Crvena Zvezda
- Dinamo Pančevo
- OKK Beograd
- Partizan
- Radnički Belgrade
(Socialist Republic of Croatia) PR Croatia
- Lokomotiva
- Zadar
- Željezničar Karlovac
(Socialist Republic of Bosnia and Herzegovina) PR Bosnia and Herzegovina
- Sloboda Tuzla
(Socialist Republic of Slovenia) PR Slovenia
- Olimpija

== Classification ==
	Season ranking 1961	Pt	G	W	L	PF	PA
1.	Olimpija	30	18	15	3	1434	1151
2.	Lokomotiva	26	18	13	5	1611	1419
3.	OKK Beograd	24	18	12	6	1435	1186
4.	Zadar	24	18	12	6	1563	1431
5.	Partizan	20	18	10	8	1512	1430
6.	Crvena Zvezda	20	18	10	8	1427	1369
7.	Željezničar Karlovac	16	18	8	10	1347	1375
8.	Radnički Belgrade	16	18	8	10	1258	1316
9.	Sloboda Tuzla	2	18	1	17	1038	1379
10.	Dinamo Pančevo	2	18	1	17	1035	1604

The winning roster of Olimpija:

- (Socialist Federal Republic of Yugoslavia) Marjan Kandus
- (Socialist Federal Republic of Yugoslavia) Primož Brišnik
- (Socialist Federal Republic of Yugoslavia) Bogdan Müller
- (Socialist Federal Republic of Yugoslavia) Ivo Daneu
- (Socialist Federal Republic of Yugoslavia) Matija Dermastija
- (Socialist Federal Republic of Yugoslavia) Marko Vrhovec
- (Socialist Federal Republic of Yugoslavia) Janez Bajc
- (Socialist Federal Republic of Yugoslavia) Karel Povž
- (Socialist Federal Republic of Yugoslavia) Karel Kapelj
- (Socialist Federal Republic of Yugoslavia) Boris Kristančič
- (Socialist Federal Republic of Yugoslavia) Emil Logar
- (Socialist Federal Republic of Yugoslavia) Miha Lokar

Coach: (Socialist Federal Republic of Yugoslavia) Boris Kristančič

== Qualification in 1961-62 season European competitions ==
FIBA European Champions Cup

- Olimpija (champions)
