= 1956 Yugoslav First Basketball League =

- League: Yugoslav First Basketball League
- Sport: Basketball

1956
- Season champions: (Socialist Republic of Serbia) Proleter Zrenjanin

Yugoslav First Basketball League seasons
- ← 1955 1957 →

== Teams ==
(Socialist Republic of Serbia) PR Serbia
- Crvena Zvezda
- Partizan
- Proleter Zrenjanin
- Radnički Belgrade
(Socialist Republic of Croatia) PR Croatia
- Lokomotiva
- Mladost Zagreb
- Montažno
(Socialist Republic of Slovenia) PR Slovenia
- ŽKK Ljubljana
- Olimpija
(Socialist Republic of Bosnia and Herzegovina) PR Bosnia and Herzegovina
- Sloboda Tuzla

== Classification ==
Pos	Teams	Pts	Pld	W	D	L	PF	PA
1.	Proleter Zrenjanin	29	18	14	1	3	1264	1111
2.	Olimpija	25	18	11	3	4	1186	959
3.	Partizan	24	18	10	4	4	1225	1117
4.	Crvena Zvezda	23	18	10	3	5	1179	1095
5.	Ljubljana	21	18	9	3	6	1250	1178
6.	Lokomotiva	17	18	8	1	9	1110	1158
7.	Sloboda Tuzla	15	18	7	1	10	927	965
8.	Montažno	14	18	7	0	11	1156	1194
9.	Mladost	9	18	3	3	12	1049	1244
10.	Radnički Belgrade	3	18	1	1	16	1037	1362

The winning roster of Proleter Zrenjanin:

- (Socialist Federal Republic of Yugoslavia) Vilmos Lóczi
- (Socialist Federal Republic of Yugoslavia) Dušan Radojčić
- (Socialist Federal Republic of Yugoslavia) Ljubomir Katić
- (Socialist Federal Republic of Yugoslavia) Milutin Minja
- (Socialist Federal Republic of Yugoslavia) Lajos Engler
- (Socialist Federal Republic of Yugoslavia) Aleksandar Tornjanski
- (Socialist Federal Republic of Yugoslavia) Ferenc Kurc
- (Socialist Federal Republic of Yugoslavia) Laslo Rošival
- (Socialist Federal Republic of Yugoslavia) Đura Bjeliš
- (Socialist Federal Republic of Yugoslavia) Branimir Lipovčević
- (Socialist Federal Republic of Yugoslavia) Ante Šeparević
- (Socialist Federal Republic of Yugoslavia) Jovan Kifer
- (Socialist Federal Republic of Yugoslavia) Pavle Skorobrin
- (Socialist Federal Republic of Yugoslavia) Miroslav Mirosavljević
- (Socialist Federal Republic of Yugoslavia) Lajoš Šifliš

Coach: (Socialist Federal Republic of Yugoslavia) Vojislav Stankov
