= 1957 Yugoslav First Basketball League =

- League: Yugoslav First Basketball League
- Sport: Basketball

1957
- Season champions: (Socialist Republic of Slovenia) Olimpija

Yugoslav First Basketball League seasons
- ← 1956 1958 →

== Teams ==
(Socialist Republic of Serbia) PR Serbia
- BSK (Belgrade)
- Crvena Zvezda
- Partizan
- Proleter Zrenjanin
(Socialist Republic of Croatia) PR Croatia
- Jugomontaža
- Lokomotiva
- Željezničar Karlovac
(Socialist Republic of Slovenia) PR Slovenia
- ŽKK Ljubljana
- Olimpija
(Socialist Republic of Bosnia and Herzegovina) PR Bosnia and Herzegovina
- Sloboda Tuzla

== Classification ==
	Season ranking 1957	Pt	G	W	D	L	PF	PA
1.	Olimpija	28	18	14	0	4	1444	1129
2.	Proleter Zrenjanin	25	18	12	1	5	1433	1296
3.	Crvena Zvezda	23	18	11	1	6	1231	1164
4.	Ljubljana	23	18	11	1	6	1314	1225
5.	BSK	23	18	10	3	6	1310	1215
6.	Jugomontaža	18	18	9	0	9	1187	1330
7.	Partizan	13	18	6	1	11	1172	1182
8.	Lokomotiva	11	18	5	1	12	1121	1240
9.	Željezničar Karlovac	10	18	5	0	13	1137	1310
10.	Sloboda Tuzla	7	18	3	1	14	1042	1300

The winning roster of Olimpija:

- (Socialist Federal Republic of Yugoslavia) Marjan Kandus
- (Socialist Federal Republic of Yugoslavia) Boris Kristančič
- (Socialist Federal Republic of Yugoslavia) Ivo Daneu
- (Socialist Federal Republic of Yugoslavia) Janez Škrjanc
- (Socialist Federal Republic of Yugoslavia) Matija Dermastija
- (Socialist Federal Republic of Yugoslavia) Miha Lokar
- (Socialist Federal Republic of Yugoslavia) Bogo Debevc
- (Socialist Federal Republic of Yugoslavia) Primož Brišnik
- (Socialist Federal Republic of Yugoslavia) Sašo Poljšak
- (Socialist Federal Republic of Yugoslavia) Peter Kralj

Coach: (Socialist Federal Republic of Yugoslavia) Boris Kristančič

== Scoring leaders ==
1. Radivoj Korać (BSK) – ___ points (29.1 ppg)
2. ???
3. ???

== Qualification in 1958 season European competitions ==
FIBA European Champions Cup

- Olimpija (champions)
