= Goran Savanović =

Serbian basketball player

Personal information
- Born: 28 August 1973 (age 53) Banja Luka, SFR Yugoslavia
- Listed height: 1.98 m (6 ft 6 in)
- Listed weight: 93 kg (205 lb)

Career information
- NBA draft: 1995: undrafted
- Playing career: 1991–2009
- Position: Shooting guard / point guard
- Number: 4, 10, 14, 22

Career history
- 1992–1993 1995–1996: Novi Sad
- 1996–1999: Beobanka
- 1999–2000: Prokom Trefl Sopot
- 2000–2001: Crvena zvezda
- 2001: Maccabi Ness
- 2001–2002: Anwil Włocławek
- 2002–2004: NIS Vojvodina
- 2004: Partizan Pivara MB
- 2004–2005: Oostende
- 2005–2007: ČEZ Nymburk
- 2007–2009: Prostějov

Goran Savanović (Serbian Cyrillic: Горан Савановић; born 28 August 1973) is a Serbian former professional basketball player.

== Professional career ==
A small forward, Savanović played for Novi Sad, Beobanka, Prokom Trefl Sopot, Crvena zvezda, Maccabi Ness, Anwil Włocławek, NIS Vojvodina, Partizan, Oostende, ĆEZ Nymburk, and Prostějov. He retired as a player with Prostějov in 2009.

== Career achievements ==
- Czech National League champion: 2 (with ČEZ Nymburk: 2005–06, 2006–07)
- Czech Republic Cup winner: 1 (with ČEZ Nymburk: 2006–07)
- Polish Cup winner: 1 (with Prokom Trefl Sopot: 1999–2000)
