= 1959 Yugoslav First Basketball League =

- League: Yugoslav First Basketball League
- Sport: Basketball

1959
- Season champions: (Socialist Republic of Slovenia) Olimpija

Yugoslav First Basketball League seasons
- ← 1958 1960 →

== Teams ==
(Socialist Republic of Serbia) PR Serbia
- Crvena Zvezda
- OKK Beograd
- Partizan
- Proleter Zrenjanin
- Zastava Kragujevac
(Socialist Republic of Croatia) PR Croatia
- Lokomotiva
- Zadar
- Željezničar Karlovac
(Socialist Republic of Slovenia) PR Slovenia
- ŽKK Ljubljana
- Olimpija

== Classification ==
	Season ranking 1959	Pt	G	W	D	L	PF	PA
1.	Olimpija	27	18	13	1	4	1486	1192
2.	Crvena Zvezda	23	18	11	1	6	1562	1471
3.	Željezničar Karlovac	22	18	11	0	7	1302	1272
4.	Partizan	21	18	10	1	7	1399	1430
5.	Zadar	20	18	10	0	8	1462	1421
6.	OKK Beograd	18	18	9	0	9	1406	1298
7.	Ljubljana	17	18	8	1	9	1339	1378
8.	Proleter Zrenjanin	16	18	8	0	10	1237	1278
9.	Lokomotiva	8	18	4	0	14	1183	1331
10.	Zastava Kragujevac	8	18	4	0	14	1119	1424

The winning roster of Olimpija:

- (Socialist Federal Republic of Yugoslavia) Boris Kristančič
- (Socialist Federal Republic of Yugoslavia) Janez Bajc
- (Socialist Federal Republic of Yugoslavia) Janko Šolmajer
- (Socialist Federal Republic of Yugoslavia) Karel Povž
- (Socialist Federal Republic of Yugoslavia) Marko Vrhovec
- (Socialist Federal Republic of Yugoslavia) Igor Jelnikar
- (Socialist Federal Republic of Yugoslavia) Miha Lokar
- (Socialist Federal Republic of Yugoslavia) Marjan Kandus
- (Socialist Federal Republic of Yugoslavia) Matija Dermastija
- (Socialist Federal Republic of Yugoslavia) Emil Logar
- (Socialist Federal Republic of Yugoslavia) Karel Kapelj
- (Socialist Federal Republic of Yugoslavia) Ivo Daneu
- (Socialist Federal Republic of Yugoslavia) Peter Kralj
- (Socialist Federal Republic of Yugoslavia) Primož Brišnik

Coach: (Socialist Federal Republic of Yugoslavia) Boris Kristančič

== Qualification in 1959-60 season European competitions ==
FIBA European Champions Cup

- Olimpija (champions)
