= Petronije Zimonjić =

Serbian basketball strength and conditioning coach (1942–2021)

Personal information
- Born: 31 December 1942 Čačak, German-occupied Serbia
- Died: 9 January 2021 (aged 78) Belgrade, Serbia
- Position: Strength and conditioning coach

Career history

Coaching
- 1978–1979: Crvena zvezda Women (conditioning)
- OKK Beograd (conditioning)
- 1992–1994: Crvena zvezda (conditioning)
- 1997–2000: Beobanka (conditioning)
- 2000–2006: Partizan (conditioning)
- 2010–2011: Crvena zvezda (conditioning)
Medals
Men's basketball
Conditioning Coach for FR Yugoslavia
EuroBasket
Gold medal – first place	1995 Greece	Team

Petronije "Pera" Zimonjić (Serbian Cyrillic: Петроније "Пера" Зимоњић; 31 December 1942 – 9 January 2021) was a Serbian professional basketball strength and conditioning coach.

== Coaching career ==
In the 1978–79 season, Zimonjić was a strength and conditioning coach for the Crvena zvezda women's team under head coach Strahinja Alagić that won the FIBA Women's European Champions Cup (now EuroLeague Women).

Between 1992 and 1994, Zimonjić was a strength and conditioning coach for the Crvena zvezda men's team under head coach Vladislav Lučić that won two National titles, 1992–93 and 1993–94. Later, in the 2010–11 season, he was a strength and conditioning coach for the Zvezda under head coach Mihailo Uvalin.

Zimonjić worked as a strength and conditioning coach for OKK Beograd, Beobanka, and Partizan. He joined Partizan in November 2000. Also, he was a member of the Duško Vujošević coaching staff in Partizan.

In 1995, Zimonjić was a strength and conditioning coach for the Yugoslavia national team under head coach Dušan Ivković that won a gold medal at EuroBasket 1995 in Greece.

== Career achievements ==
- FIBA Women's European Champions Cup champion: 1 (with Crvena zvezda: 1978–79)
- Yugoslav League champion: 7 (with Crvena zvezda: 1992–93, 1993–94; with Partizan: 2001–02, 2002–03, 2003–04, 2004–05, 2005–06)
- Yugoslav Cup winner: 1 (with Partizan: 2001–02)
- Yugoslav Women's League champion: 1 (with Crvena zvezda: 1978–79)
- Yugoslav Women's Cup winner: 1 (with Crvena zvezda: 1978–79)

== Personal life ==
He was a father of Predrag "Bata" Zimonjić, a basketball strength and conditioning coach, a long-time assistant to Željko Obradović. He was a grandfather of Bogdan Zimonjić, a basketball player who played for Dynamic BG and currently playing college basketball for the Florida Atlantic Owls.
