= KK Proleter Zrenjanin =

Basketball club in Zrenjanin, Serbia

Proleter Naftagas
- Leagues: Second League of Serbia
- Founded: 1947; 79 years ago
- History: KK Proleter; 1947–present
- Arena: Crystal Hall
- Capacity: 2,800
- Location: Zrenjanin, Serbia
- Team colors: Red, White
- President: Bojan Davidovac
- Head coach: Filip Socek
- Championships: 1 National Championship

Košarkaški klub Proleter (Serbian Cyrillic: Кошаркашки клуб Пролетер), commonly referred to as KK Proleter Zrenjanin, is a men's professional basketball club based in Zrenjanin, Serbia. They currently participate in the Second Basketball League of Serbia. The club is also known as Proleter Naftagas due to sponsorship reasons. They are the first club in Serbia outside Belgrade which won a national title.

== History ==
Old club's logo

Formed in 1947, they immediately became one of the leading clubs in the Yugoslavia. The club was named after Proletariat. In the 1948 season, just one year after its establishment, the club won second place in the national championship. They also finished runners-up in 1952 and 1955, before finally won the national title in the 1956 season. At the time, the club has a notable starting five consisted of players Vilmos Lóczi, Lajos Engler, Dušan Radojčić, Ljubomir Katić, and Milutin Minja.

After more than a decade playing in the lower leagues, the club participated in the Basketball League of Serbia from 2009 to 2012.

== Sponsorship naming ==
KK Proleter has had several denominations through the years due to its sponsorship:

- Kombinat Servo Mihalj: 1970s
- Permont Proleter: 1994–1995
- Proleter Naftagas: ?–present

== Players ==
=== Current roster ===
Note: Flags indicate national team eligibility at FIBA sanctioned events. Players may hold other non-FIBA nationality not displayed.

No.		Position	Player
9	(Serbia)	G	Dušan Milošević
	(Serbia)	PF	Uroš Mirković

== Coaches ==
- (Socialist Federal Republic of Yugoslavia) Vilmos Lóczi
- (Socialist Federal Republic of Yugoslavia) Ljubomir Katić
- (Socialist Federal Republic of Yugoslavia) Dušan Radojčić
- (Socialist Federal Republic of Yugoslavia) Marijan Novović (1987–1988)
- (Federal Republic of Yugoslavia) Kosta Jankov (1994–1995)
- (Serbia) Dragan Nikolić (2006–2007)
- (Serbia) Zoran Todorović (2007–2008)
- (Serbia) Zoran Bajin (2010–2019)
- (Serbia) Stefan Atanacković (2019–2025)
- (Serbia) Filip Socek (2025–present)

== Trophies and awards ==
=== Trophies ===
- Yugoslav League (defunct)
  - Winners (1): 1956
  - Runners-up (4): 1948, 1952, 1955, 1957
- Second League of Serbia (2nd-tier)
  - Winner (1): 2016–17

=== Awards ===
- Yugoslav League Top Scorer
  - Novaković – 1947, 1948
  - Vilmos Lóczi – 1952

== Notable players ==
- (Socialist Federal Republic of Yugoslavia) Vilmos Lóczi
- (Socialist Federal Republic of Yugoslavia) Lajos Engler
- (Socialist Federal Republic of Yugoslavia) Dušan Radojčić
- (Socialist Federal Republic of Yugoslavia) Ljubomir Katić
- (Socialist Federal Republic of Yugoslavia) Milutin Minja
- (Serbia) Dejan Bodiroga
- (Montenegro) Luka Pavićević
