= KK Dalvin =

Basketball club from Split, Croatia

KK Dalvin is a basketball club from Split, Croatia.

The color of jerseys is blue.

The team competes in the A-2 Liga-Jug.

Head coach is Mirko Gašpar.

The club is nicknamed "growers". Dalvin stands for Dalmacijavino, a company that was a longtime patron of the club. KK Dalvin was the first club in the former country that had "American style" jerseys.

The club had its most successful moments at the end of 1970s when it entered the first division of the former state. They have played only one season in the first division and scored only one victory - in Split against Rabotnički from Skopje.

== Famous players and coaches ==
Although not having won titles, some of Croatia's basketball legends originated there.

In early 1980s, some of their known players were Mlađan Tudor, Josip Puljiz and Bjelajac.

The most famous players who were playing in "Dalvin" are Croatian national team players Dino Rađa, Josip Vranković and Ante Grgurević.
