= KK Partizan accomplishments and records =

Statistics for Serbian basketball club

This page details the all-time statistics, records, and other achievements pertaining to the KK Partizan. Partizan is the professional basketball club based in Belgrade, Serbia. The club competes in the Basketball League of Serbia, Adriatic League and Euroleague. Partizan has won as many as 51 trophies, and it is most successful basketball club in Serbia.

== Honours ==
Total titles: 51

Honours		No.	Years
League – 22
Yugoslav League	Winners	5	1976, 1979, 1981, 1987, 1992
Serbia and Montenegro League	Winners	8	1995, 1996, 1997, 2002, 2003, 2004, 2005, 2006
Serbian League	Winners{	9^{s}	2007, 2008, 2009, 2010, 2011, 2012, 2013, 2014, 2025
Cups – 16
Yugoslav Cup	Winners	3	1979, 1989, 1992
Serbia and Montenegro Cup	Winners	5	1994, 1995, 1999, 2000, 2002
Radivoj Korać Cup	Winners	8	2008, 2009, 2010, 2011, 2012, 2018, 2019, 2020
European – 4
EuroLeague	Winners	1	1992
FIBA Korać Cup	Winners	3	1978, 1979, 1989
Regional – 9
ABA League	Winners	8	2007, 2008, 2009, 2010, 2011, 2013, 2023, 2025
ABA League Supercup	Winners	1^{s}	2019
Individual club awards – 1
Triple Crown	Winners	1	1991–92

Record

^{S} Shared record

== Individual awards ==
Award winners

The Naismith Hall of Fame

- Dražen Dalipagić
- Aleksandar Nikolić
- Vlade Divac

FIBA's 50 Greatest Players

- Dražen Dalipagić
- Dragan Kićanović
- Vlade Divac

FIBA Hall of Fame

- Dražen Dalipagić
- Dragan Kićanović
- Vlade Divac
- Aleksandar Nikolić
- Ranko Žeravica

50 Greatest Euroleague Contributors

- Dražen Dalipagić
- Predrag Danilović
- Aleksandar Đorđević
- Vlade Divac
- Aleksandar Nikolić
- Dušan Ivković
- Željko Obradović

Mr. Europa

- Dražen Dalipagić (1977)
- Dražen Dalipagić (1978)
- Dragan Kićanović (1981)
- Dragan Kićanović (1982)
- Vlade Divac (1989)

Euroscar

- Dražen Dalipagić (1980)
- Dragan Kićanović (1981)
- Dragan Kićanović (1982)

FIBA Europe Young Men's Player of the Year

- Jan Veselý (2010)

Euroleague Weekly MVP

- Miloš Vujanić (2003)
- Dejan Milojević (2005)
- Dejan Milojević (2006)
- Nikola Peković (2008)
- Novica Veličković (2008)
- Novica Veličković (2009)
- Aleks Marić (3x) (2010)
- Dušan Kecman (2010)
- Milan Mačvan (2012)
- Danté Exum (2023)
- Kevin Punter (2023)
- Kevin Punter (2024)
- James Nunnally (2024)
- Carlik Jones (2x) (2025)
- Sterling Brown (2026)
- Carlik Jones (2027)

Euroleague Final Four MVP

- Predrag Danilović (1992)

Euroleague Top Scorer

- Miroslav Berić (2001)
- Miloš Vujanić (2003)

Euroleague Monthly MVP

- Milt Palacio (2008)
- Novica Veličković (2009)
- Aleks Marić (2010)
- Carlik Jones (2026)

All-Euroleague First Team

- Aleks Marić (2010)
- Mathias Lessort (2023)

All-Euroleague Second Team

- Miloš Vujanić (2003)
- Nikola Peković (2008)
- Bo McCalebb (2010)
- Kevin Punter (2023)

Euroleague Rising Star

- Novica Veličković (2009)
- Bogdan Bogdanović (2014)
- Yam Madar (2023)

Euroleague Coach of the Year

- Duško Vujošević (2009)

All-EuroCup Second Team

- Kevin Punter (2022)

EuroCup MVP of the Round

- Milan Mačvan (2014)
- Nigel Williams-Goss (2017)
- Rade Zagorac (2019)
- Corey Walden (2020)
- Mathias Lessort (2022)
- Zach LeDay (2022)

BCL Star Lineup Second Best Team

- Will Hatcher (2017)

Basketball Champions League Game Day MVP

- Novica Veličković (2016)

Adriatic League MVP

- Dejan Milojević (2005)
- Dejan Milojević (2006)

Adriatic League Play-off/Final 4 MVP

- Vonteego Cummings (2006)
- Nikola Peković (2008)
- Novica Veličković (2009)
- Nathan Jawai (2011)
- Kevin Punter (2023)
- Tyrique Jones (2025)

Adriatic League Top Scorer

- Dejan Milojević (2005)
- Dejan Milojević (2006)
- Duane Washington (2026)

ABA League Ideal Five

- Bogdan Bogdanović – 2014
- Joffrey Lauvergne – 2014
- Aleksandar Pavlović – 2015
- Milan Mačvan – 2015
- Novica Veličković – 2017
- Novica Veličković – 2018
- Jock Landale – 2019
- Kevin Punter – 2022
- Zach LeDay – 2022
- Kevin Punter – 2023
- Danté Exum – 2023
- Mathias Lessort – 2023
- Zach LeDay – 2024
- Sterling Brown – 2025
- Isaac Bonga – 2026

ABA Supercup MVP

- Rashawn Thomas – 2019

Basketball League of Serbia MVP

- Novica Veličković (2009)

Basketball League of Serbia Play-off MVP

- Nikola Peković (2008)
- Novica Veličković (2009)
- Bo McCalebb (2010)
- Curtis Jerrells (2011)
- Dragan Milosavljević (2013)
- Bogdan Bogdanović (2014)
- Duane Washington (2025)

Radivoj Korać Cup MVP

- Milenko Tepić (2008)
- Novica Veličković (2009)
- Aleks Marić (2010)
- James Gist (2011)
- Danilo Anđušić (2012)
- Nigel Williams-Goss (2018)
- Alex Renfroe (2019)
- Ognjen Jaramaz (2020)

Radivoj Korać Cup Top Scorer

- Curtis Jerrells (2011)
- Jock Landale (2019)
- Marcus Paige (2020)

== International record ==
Season	Achievement	Notes
Euroleague
1979–80	Semi-final group stage	6th place in a group with Maccabi Tel Aviv, Real Madrid, Bosna, Sinudyne Bologna and Nashua Den Bosch
1981–82	Semi-final group stage	3rd place in a group with Maccabi Tel Aviv, Squibb Cantù, FC Barcelona, Nashua Den Bosch and Panathinaikos
1987–88	Final Four	3rd place in Ghent, lost to Maccabi Tel Aviv 82–87 in the semi-final, defeated Aris 105–93 in the 3rd place game
1991–92	Champions	defeated Philips Milano 82–75 in the semi-final, defeated Montigalà Joventut 71–70 in the final of the Final Four in Istanbul
1997–98	Final Four	4th place in Barcelona, lost to Kinder Bologna 61–83 in the semi-final, lost to Benetton Treviso 89–96 in the 3rd place game
2007–08	Quarter-finals	eliminated 2–1 by Tau Cerámica, 66–74 (L) in Vitoria-Gasteiz, 76–55 (W) in Belgrade, 68–85 (L) in Vitoria-Gasteiz
2008–09	Quarter-finals	eliminated 3–0 by CSKA Moscow, 47–56 (L) in Moscow, 50–77 (L) in Belgrade, 56–67 (L) in Moscow
2009–10	Final Four	4th place in Paris, lost to Olympiacos 80–83 in the semi-final, lost to CSKA Moscow 88–90 in the 3rd place game
2022–23	Quarter-finals	eliminated 3–2 by Real Madrid, 89–87 (W) in Madrid, 95–80 (W) in Madrid, 80–82 (L) in Belgrade, 78–85 (L) in Belgrade, 94–98 (L) in Madrid
Saporta Cup
1966–67	Quarter-finals	eliminated by Ignis Varèse, 55–83 (L) in Varese and 73–76 (L) in Belgrade
1989–90	Quarter-finals	3rd place in a group with Real Madrid, PAOK and Mulhouse
1995–96	Quarter-finals	4th place in a group with Taugrés, Žalgiris, Limoges, Bnei Herzliya and Sunair Oostende
1998–99	Quarter-finals	eliminated by Benetton Treviso, 73–73 (D) in Belgrade and 77–90 (L) in Treviso
Korać Cup
1973–74	Final	lost to Forst Cantù, 86–99 (L) in Cantù and 75–68 (W) in Belgrade in the double finals of Korać Cup
1974–75	Semi-finals	eliminated by Forst Cantù, 101–88 (W) in Belgrade and 67–84 (L) in Cantù
1977–78	Champions	defeated Bosna, 117–110 in the final of Korać Cup in Banja Luka
1978–79	Champions	defeated Arrigoni Rieti, 108–98 in the final of Korać Cup in Belgrade
1988–89	Champions	defeated Wiwa Vismara Cantù, 76–89 (L) in Cantù and 101–82 (W) in Belgrade in the double finals of Korać Cup

=== Road to the 1992 Euroleague victory ===
Round	Team	Home	Away
Qualification	(Hungary) Szolnok Olaj	89–72 W	92–65 W
Group Stage	(Netherlands) Commodore Den Helder	81–75 W	111–77 W
Group Stage	(Belgium) Maes Pils	87–67 W	72–86 L
Group Stage	(Italy) Philips Milano	86–70 W	94–89 W
Group Stage	(Spain) Montigalà Joventut	76–75 W	76–79 L
Group Stage	(Germany) Bayer 04 Leverkusen	93–69 W	73–80 L
Group Stage	(Spain) Estudiantes Caja Postal	75–95 L	72–75 L
Group Stage	(Greece) Aris	83–75 W	99–65 W
Quarterfinal	(Italy) Knorr Bologna	78–65 W	60–61 L
Quarterfinal	(Italy) Knorr Bologna	78–65 W	69–65 W
Final Four; Semifinal	(Italy) Philips Milano	82–75 W	
Final Four; Final	(Spain) Montigalà Joventut	71–70 W	

== Domestic record ==
Season	Achievement	Notes
National Championship (Yugoslavia / Serbia and Montenegro / Serbia)
1975–76	Winner	1st after 26 regular season games with 44 pts
1978–79	Winner	1st after 22 regular season games with 34 pts
1980–81	Winner	1st after 22 regular season games with 38 pts
1986–87	Winner	Defeated C. zvezda 2–0 in playoff final
1991–92	Winner	Defeated C. zvezda 3–0 in playoff final
1994–95	Winner	Defeated Borovica 4–1 in playoff final
1995–96	Winner	Defeated BFC Beočin 3–2 in playoff final
1996–97	Winner	Defeated FMP 3–1 in playoff final
2001–02	Winner	Defeated Budućnost 3–0 in playoff final
2002–03	Winner	Defeated FMP 3–0 in playoff final
2003–04	Winner	Defeated Hemofarm 3–1 in playoff final
2004–05	Winner	Defeated Hemofarm 3–1 in playoff final
2005–06	Winner	Defeated C. zvezda 3–0 in playoff final
2006–07	Winner	Defeated C. zvezda 3–1 in playoff final
2007–08	Winner	Defeated Hemofarm 3–1 in playoff final
2008–09	Winner	Defeated C. zvezda 3–2 in playoff final
2009–10	Winner	Defeated Hemofarm 3–0 in playoff final
2010–11	Winner	Defeated Hemofarm 3–0 in playoff final
2011–12	Winner	Defeated C. zvezda 3–1 in playoff final
2012–13	Winner	Defeated C. zvezda 3–1 in playoff final
2013–14	Winner	Defeated C. zvezda 3–1 in playoff final
2024–25	Winner	Defeated Spartak 2–0 in playoff final

Season	Achievement	Notes
National Cup (Yugoslavia / Serbia)
1978–79	Winner	Defeated Zadar 93–86 in final
1988–89	Winner	Defeated Jugoplastika 87–74 in final
1991–92	Winner	Defeated Bosna 105–79 in final
1993–94	Winner	Defeated C. zvezda 104–102 in final
1994–95	Winner	Defeated Spartak 84–81 in final
1998–99	Winner	Defeated FMP 80–69 in final
1999–00	Winner	Defeated Zdravlje 79–66 in final
2001–02	Winner	Defeated Budućnost 88–81 in final
2007–08	Winner	Defeated Hemofarm 73–64 in final
2008–09	Winner	Defeated C. zvezda 80–65 in final
2009–10	Winner	Defeated FMP 72–62 in final
2010–11	Winner	Defeated FMP 77–73 in final
2011–12	Winner	Defeated C. zvezda 64–51 in final
2017–18	Winner	Defeated C. zvezda 81–75 in final
2018–19	Winner	Defeated C. zvezda 76–74 in final
2019–20	Winner	Defeated C. zvezda 85–84 in final

== Regional record ==
Season	Achievement	Notes
Adriatic League
2004–05	Runners-up	Defeated by Hemofarm 76–89 in final
2005–06	Runners-up	Defeated by FMP 72–73 in final
2006–07	Winner	Defeated FMP away 85–83 (W) and home 94–82 (W) in final
2007–08	Winner	Defeated Hemofarm 69–51 in final
2008–09	Winner	Defeated Cibona 63–49 in final
2009–10	Winner	Defeated Cibona 75–74 in final
2010–11	Winner	Defeated Olimpija 77–74 in final
2012–13	Winner	Defeated C.zvezda 71–63 in final
2021–22	Runners-up	Defeated by C.zvezda 2–3 in playoff final
2022–23	Winner	Defeated C.zvezda 3–2 in playoff final
2023–24	Runners-up	Defeated by C.zvezda 0–3 in playoff final
2024–25	Winner	Defeated Budućnost 3–1 in playoff final
2025–26	Runners-up	Defeated by Dubai 1–3 in playoff final

Year	Achievement	Notes
ABA League Supercup
2019	Winner	Defeated Cedevita Olimpija 99–77 in final
2023	Runners-up	Defeated by Studentski centar 81–83 in final

== Adriatic League ==
=== The biggest wins in Adriatic League ===
Home wins

Season	Match	Score	Pts dif.
2021–22	Partizan – Split	109 – 49	+60
2022–23	Partizan – MZT Skopje	120 – 67	+53
2010–11	Partizan – Široki	93 – 43	+50
2021–22	Partizan – Krka	92 – 45	+47
2024–25	Partizan – Split	110 – 64	+46
2023–24	Partizan – Borac Čačak	101 – 56	+45
2007–08	Partizan – Zagreb	109 – 65	+44
2011–12	Partizan – Zlatorog Laško	90 – 50	+40
2023–24	Partizan – Zadar	113 – 74	+39
2022–23	Partizan – Zadar	114 – 77	+37
2019–20	Partizan – Cibona	102 – 66	+36
2025–26	Partizan – Split	110 – 74	+36
2004–05	Partizan – Široki	94 – 59	+35
2010–11	Partizan – Zadar	85 – 50	+35
2024–25	Partizan – Cibona	113 – 78	+35
2014–15	Partizan – Zadar	87 – 53	+34
2024–25	Partizan – Krka	96 – 63	+33
2018–19	Partizan – Krka	87 – 55	+32
2023–24	Partizan – Mega MIS	112 – 80	+32
2023–24	Partizan – Mornar Bar	110 – 78	+32
2010–11	Partizan – Crvena zvezda	99 – 68	+31
2006–07	Partizan – Hemofarm	80 – 49	+31
2021–22	Partizan – Zadar	103 – 72	+31
2023–24	Partizan – FMP	88 – 57	+31
2006–07	Partizan – Split	111 – 81	+30
2022–23	Partizan – Borac Čačak	114 – 84	+30
2024–25	Partizan – Borac Čačak	96 – 66	+30
2024–25	Partizan – Dubai	102 – 72	+30

Away wins

Season	Match	Score	Pts dif.
2023–24	Igokea – Partizan	52 – 98	+46
2023–24	FMP – Partizan	61 – 105	+44
2005–06	Zagreb – Partizan	68 – 108	+40
2023–24	Krka – Partizan	56 – 96	+40
2025–26	Bosna – Partizan	56 – 96	+40
2024–25	Cibona – Partizan	59 – 93	+34
2014–15	Levski Sofia – Partizan	66 – 98	+32
2016–17	MZT Skopje – Partizan	62 – 93	+31
2010–11	Cibona – Partizan	55 – 85	+30
2019–20	FMP – Partizan	57 – 87	+30
2021–22	Mega Mozzart – Partizan	68 – 97	+29
2024–25	Borac Čačak – Partizan	60 – 89	+29
2006–07	Slovan – Partizan	69 – 97	+28
2011–12	Zagreb – Partizan	65 – 93	+28
2024–25	FMP – Partizan	64 – 91	+27
2024–25	Mornar Bar – Partizan	78 – 105	+27
2024–25	Igokea – Partizan	80 – 107	+27
2013–14	Radnički Kragujevac – Partizan	66 – 92	+26
2022–23	Mega MIS – Partizan	78 – 103	+25
2018–19	Cibona – Partizan	59 – 83	+24
2022–23	Cibona – Partizan	81 – 105	+24
2007–08	Olimpija Ljubljana – Partizan	60 – 83	+23
2023–24	Mornar Bar – Partizan	76 – 98	+22
2025–26	Igokea – Partizan	81 – 103	+22

==== Positions by year ====
#	02	03	04	05	06	07	08	09	10	11	12	13	14	15	16	17	18	19	20	21	22	23	24	25	26	27
1						1	1	1	1	1		1							1			1		1		
2				2	2																2		2		2	
3											3					3										
4													4	4				4								
5															5		5									
6																										
7																				7						
8																										
9																										
10																										
11																										
12																										
13																										
14																										
15																										
16																										

- Longest winning streak
  - 16 games in the 2022–23 season.
- Longest losing streak
  - 5 games in the 2020–21 season.
- Most Won Games in a Season
  - 24 out of 26 games for the 2007–08 season.
- Most Lost Games in a Season
  - Lost 14 out of 26 games for the 2015–16 season.

==== Average attendance record ====
Adriatic League
2008–09	2,007		Record 5,532 vs. Olimpija; Lowest 818 vs. Vojvodina
2009–10	2,856	▲	Record 5,001 vs. FMP; Lowest 720 vs. Široki
2010–11	4,255	▲	Record 6,320 vs. Olimpija; Lowest 3,010 vs. Zadar
2011–12	4,123	▼	Record 6,050 vs. Helios; Lowest 1,500 vs. Zlatorog Laško
2012–13	5,154	▲	Record 7,000 vs. Szolnoki Olaj; Lowest 2,000 vs. Olimpija
2013–14	5,775	▲	Record 6,700 vs. Široki; Lowest 4,500 vs. Olimpija
2014–15	6,034	▲	Record 7,000 at five matches Lowest 2,500 vs. Metalac Valjevo
2015–16	4,539	▼	Record 6,000 vs. Zadar & Cibona; Lowest 2,500 vs. Igokea & Tajfun
2016–17	4,708	▲	Record 7,500 vs. Cedevita; Lowest 2,300 vs. Igokea
2017–18	4,591	▼	Record 6,300 vs. Cibona; Lowest 2,850 vs. MZT Skopje
2018–19	5,535	▲	Record 7,920 vs. Zadar; Lowest 1,200* vs. Mornar Bar
2019–20	5,995	▲	Record 16,531 vs. Budućnost; Lowest 2,469* vs. Krka
2020–21	COVID-19 pandemic.		
2021–22	5,073	▼	Record 8,944 vs. Budućnost; Lowest 2,713 vs. Borac Čačak
2022–23	10,317	▲	Record 22,198 vs. Crvena zvezda Lowest 3,396 vs. FMP
2023–24	10,454	▲	Record 23,021 vs. Mega; Lowest 4,417 vs. Igokea
2024–25	9,185	▼	Record 21,434 vs. Budućnost; Lowest 2,247 vs. Mornar Bar
2025–26			Record 15,547 vs. Crvena zvezda Lowest 1,107 vs. Igokea

== Player records ==
Name	Games
(Serbia) Novica Veličković	509
(Serbia) Petar Božić	471
(Serbia) Dušan Kecman	444
(Socialist Federal Republic of Yugoslavia) Milenko Savović	386
(Serbia) Uroš Tripković	378
(Federal Republic of Yugoslavia) Predrag Drobnjak	368
(Socialist Federal Republic of Yugoslavia) Dragan Todorić	363
(Socialist Federal Republic of Yugoslavia) Miodrag Marić	362
(Federal Republic of Yugoslavia) Aleksandar Čubrilo	343
(Socialist Federal Republic of Yugoslavia) Dušan Kerkez	339

Name	Points
(Socialist Federal Republic of Yugoslavia) Dražen Dalipagić	8278
(Socialist Federal Republic of Yugoslavia) Dragan Kićanović	6520
(Socialist Federal Republic of Yugoslavia) Miodrag Marić	4688
(Federal Republic of Yugoslavia) Miroslav Berić	4507
(Socialist Federal Republic of Yugoslavia) Radovan Radović	4188
(Socialist Federal Republic of Yugoslavia) Miloš Bojović	4086
(Serbia) Dušan Kecman	3897
(Socialist Federal Republic of Yugoslavia) Goran Grbović	3889
(Federal Republic of Yugoslavia) Predrag Drobnjak	3775
(Federal Republic of Yugoslavia) Haris Brkić	3740

_{*Players in bold are still active}

=== Records in EuroLeague ===
	Player	Position		Opponent	Date
Most points	(Federal Republic of Yugoslavia) Vlado Šćepanović	SG	40	(Russia) Ural Great	January 10, 2002
Most rebounds	(Serbia and Montenegro) Dejan Milojević	PF	20	(Spain) Adecco Estudiantes	November 11, 2004
Most assists	(Serbia) Bogdan Bogdanović	SG	10	(Ukraine) Budivelnyk	December 5, 2013
Most PIR	(Australia) Aleks Marić	C	49	(Turkey) Efes Pilsen	December 10, 2009

== NBA ==
=== Players in the NBA draft ===
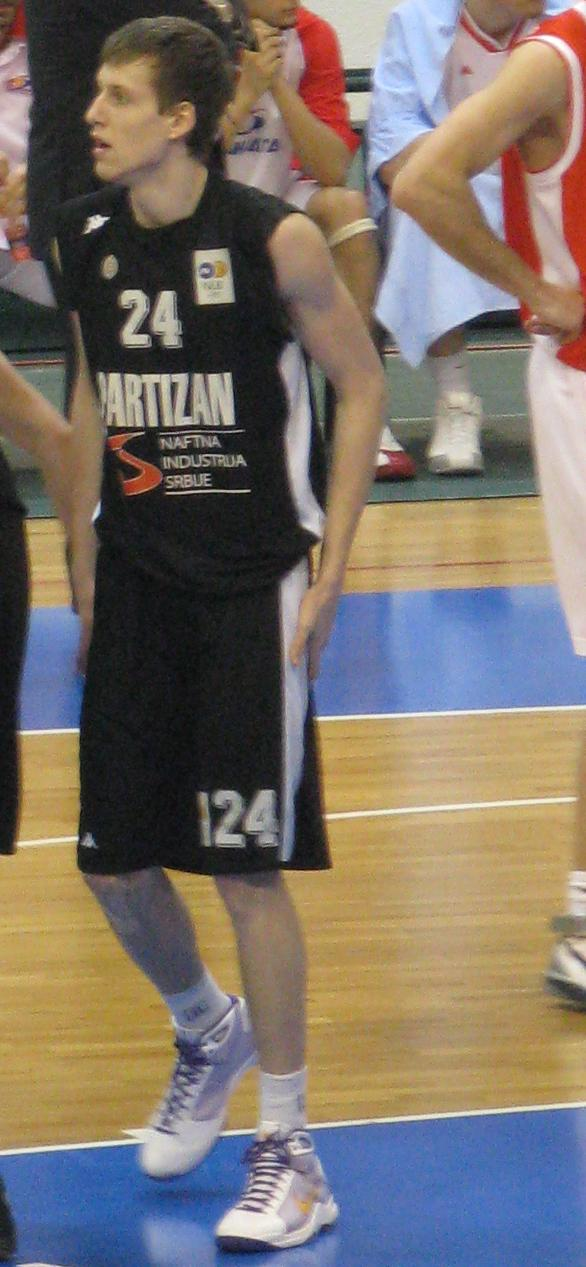
Veselý with Partizan

Players in the NBA Draft
- (Serbia) Vlade Divac – 1st round, 26th overall by the Los Angeles Lakers in 1989
- (Serbia) Predrag Danilović – 2nd round, 43rd overall by the Golden State Warriors in 1992
- (Serbia) Željko Rebrača – 2nd round, 54th overall by the Seattle SuperSonics in 1994
- (Montenegro) Predrag Drobnjak – 2nd round, 48th overall by the Washington Bullets in 1997
- (Serbia) Nenad Krstić – 1st round, 24th overall by the New Jersey Nets in 2002
- (Serbia) Miloš Vujanić – 2nd round, 36th overall by the New York Knicks in 2002
- (Serbia) Kosta Perović – 2nd round, 38th overall by the Golden State Warriors in 2006
- (Montenegro) Nikola Peković – 2nd round, 31st overall by the Minnesota Timberwolves in 2008
- (Czech Republic) Jan Veselý – 1st round, 6th overall by the Washington Wizards in 2011
- (France) Joffrey Lauvergne – 2nd round, 55th overall by the Memphis Grizzlies in 2013
- (Serbia) Bogdan Bogdanović – 1st round, 27th overall by the Phoenix Suns in 2014
- (Serbia) Nikola Milutinov – 1st round, 26th overall by the San Antonio Spurs in 2015
- (Serbia) Vanja Marinković – 2nd round, 60th overall by the Sacramento Kings in 2019
- (Serbia) Tristan Vukčević – 2nd round, 42nd overall by the Washington Wizards in 2023

=== Moved to an NBA team ===
Year	Pos.	Player	Moving to	Notes
1989	SF	(Socialist Federal Republic of Yugoslavia) Žarko Paspalj	San Antonio Spurs	
1989	C	(Socialist Federal Republic of Yugoslavia) Vlade Divac	Los Angeles Lakers	
2004	C	(Serbia and Montenegro) Nenad Krstić	New Jersey Nets	
2007	C	(Serbia) Kosta Perović	Golden State Warriors	
2011	PF	(Czech Republic) Jan Veselý	Washington Wizards	
2023	PG	(Australia) Dante Exum	Dallas Mavericks	
2024	PF/C	(Serbia) Tristan Vukčević	Washington Wizards	
2024	SG/SF	(United States) PJ Dozier	Minnesota Timberwolves	
2024	F/C	(United States) Frank Kaminsky	Phoenix Suns	
2026	PG/SG	(United States) Cameron Payne	Philadelphia 76ers	

=== Signed from an NBA team ===
Year	Pos.	Player	From	Notes
1977	C	(United States) Butch Taylor	Philadelphia 76ers	Second foreign basketball player in Yugoslavia
2007	PG	(Belize) Milt Palacio	Utah Jazz	
2008	C	(Gabon) Stéphane Lasme	Miami Heat	The first ever African player in KK Partizan
2010	C	(Australia) Nathan Jawai	Minnesota Timberwolves	
2010	PG	(United States) Oliver Lafayette	Boston Celtics	
2011	PG	(United States) Acie Law	Golden State Warriors	
2011	C	(Montenegro) Nikola Peković	Minnesota Timberwolves	Played in Partizan from August 2011 to December 2011 during the 2011 NBA lockout
2013	SG	(Montenegro) Aleksandar Pavlović	Portland Trail Blazers	
2018	PG	(United States) Marcus Paige	Charlotte Hornets	
2018	SF	(United States) Anthony Brown	Minnesota Timberwolves	
2021	SF	(Latvia) Rodions Kurucs	Milwaukee Bucks	
2021	F/C	(Serbia) Alen Smailagić	Golden State Warriors	
2023	G/F	(United States) PJ Dozier	Sacramento Kings	
2023	F/C	(United States) Frank Kaminsky	Houston Rockets	
2024	PG/SG	(France) Frank Ntilikina	Charlotte Hornets	
2024	PF/SF	(Serbia) Aleksej Pokuševski	Charlotte Hornets	
2024	PG/SG	(United States) Duane Washington Jr.	New York Knicks	
2025	PG/SG	(United States) Shake Milton	Los Angeles Lakers	
2025	PG/SG	(United States) Cameron Payne	New York Knicks	
2026	G/F	(United States) Antonio Reeves	Charlotte Hornets	
