= List of KK Partizan head coaches =

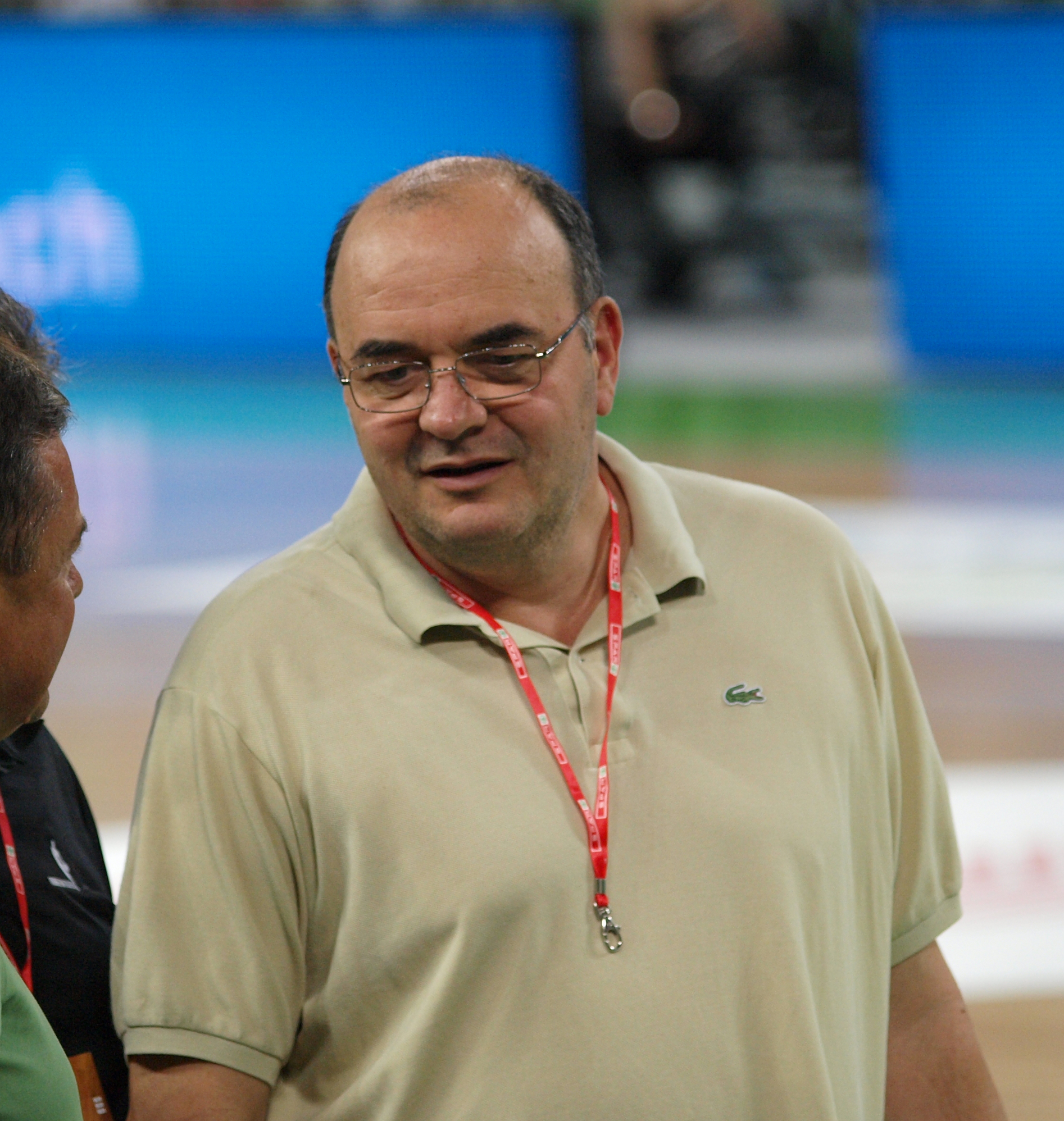
In his four separate stints as Partizan's head coach totalling fifteen and a half seasons spanning the period between 1986 and 2015, Duško Vujošević won the most trophies in club history.

KK Partizan is Serbian professional basketball club based in Belgrade, Serbia. They play in Basketball League of Serbia, Adriatic League and Euroleague. Partizan have played their home games at the Pionir Hall since 1992. In addition to Pionir Hall, Partizan also plays their home games in Kombank Arena. Partizan is the most successful basketball club in Serbia, having won total of 51 official trophies.

There have been 36 head coaches for Partizan since the founding of the club in 1945. The first head coach was Božo Grkinić who coached Partizan for two seasons. The first coach to bring Partizan official trophy was Borislav Ćorković. He won Yugoslav League with Partizan in 1976. Club won the first international trophy in 1978, while being coached by Ranko Žeravica. Željko Obradović lead the club to the most significant trophy, Euroleague in 1992. Duško Vujošević is the most successful coach in club's history. In his four stints with Partizan he won total of 23 trophies. Borislav Stanković and Ranko Žeravica are members of FIBA Hall of Fame, while Aleksandar Nikolić is a member of Basketball Hall of Fame. Furthermore, Nikolić, Dušan Ivković and Željko Obradović have been named among 50 Greatest Euroleague Contributors.

== Key ==
GC	Games coached
W	Wins
L	Losses
Win%	Winning percentage
#	Number of coaches
†	Elected into the Basketball Hall of Fame as a coach
*	Elected into the FIBA Hall of Fame as a coach
	Player-coach
	Interim head coach

== Coaches ==
As of match played 24 October 2026

#	Name	Nationality	Period	GC	W	L	Win%	Achievements
1	Božo Grkinić	Yugoslavia	1946–1947	11	6	5	.545	None
2	Svetislav Šaper	Yugoslavia	1949	18	16	2	.889	None
3	Janoš Gerdov	Yugoslavia	1950	18	16	2	.889	None
4	Borislav Stanković	Yugoslavia	1951–1953	49	32	15	.673	None
5	Miodrag Stefanović	Yugoslavia	1954	22	12	8	.591	None
6	Mirko Marjanović	Yugoslavia	1955–1958	72	34	30	.528	None
7	Aleksandar Nikolić †	Yugoslavia	1958–1961	55	29	24	.545	None
8	Božidar Munćan	Yugoslavia	1961–1963					
9	Milenko Novaković	Yugoslavia	1963–1964					
10	Borislav Ćurčić	Yugoslavia	1964–1967					
11	Branislav Rajačić	Yugoslavia	1967–1969					
12	Radovan Radović	Yugoslavia	1969–1971					
13	Ranko Žeravica*	Yugoslavia	1971–1974					
14	Borislav Ćorković	Yugoslavia	1974–1976					1 Yugoslav League
—	Ranko Žeravica*	Yugoslavia	1976–1978					1 FIBA Korać Cup
15	Dušan Ivković*	Yugoslavia	1978–1980					1 FIBA Korać Cup; 1 Yugoslav League; 1 Yugoslav Cup; 50 Greatest Euroleague Contributors
—	Borislav Ćorković	Yugoslavia	1980–1982					1 Yugoslav League
16	Borislav Džaković	Yugoslavia	1982–1984					
17	Zoran Slavnić	Yugoslavia	1984–1985					
18	Vladislav Lučić	Yugoslavia	1985–1986					
19	Duško Vujošević	Yugoslavia	1986–1989					1 FIBA Korać Cup; 1 Yugoslav League; 1 Yugoslav Cup
20	Dejan Srzić	Yugoslavia	1989					
—	Borislav Ćorković	Yugoslavia	1989–1990					
—	Duško Vujošević	Yugoslavia	1990–1991					
21	Željko Obradović	Yugoslavia; FR Yugoslavia	1991–1993					1 FIBA European League; 1 Yugoslav League; 1 Yugoslav Cup; 50 Greatest Euroleague Contributors
22	Željko Lukajić	FR Yugoslavia	1993–1994					1 Serbia and Montenegro Cup
—	Borislav Džaković	FR Yugoslavia	1994–1995					1 Serbia and Montenegro League; 1 Serbia and Montenegro Cup
—	Ranko Žeravica*	FR Yugoslavia	1995–1996					1 Serbia and Montenegro League
23	Miroslav Nikolić	FR Yugoslavia	1996–1998					1 Serbia and Montenegro League
24	Milovan Bogojević	FR Yugoslavia	1998					
—	Vladislav Lučić	FR Yugoslavia	1998–1999					1 Serbia and Montenegro Cup
25	Nenad Trajković	FR Yugoslavia	1999–2000					1 Serbia and Montenegro Cup
26	Darko Ruso	FR Yugoslavia	2000–2001					
—	Duško Vujošević	FR Yugoslavia; Serbia	2001–2010	570	404	166	.709	5 Serbia and Montenegro Leagues; 1 Serbia and Montenegro Cup; 4 Serbian Leagues; 3 Radivoj Korac Cups; 4 ABA League; Euroleague Coach of the Year (2009)
27	Vlade Jovanović	Serbia	2010–2012	127	90	37	.709	2 Serbian Leagues; 2 Radivoj Korać Cups; 1 ABA League
—	Duško Vujošević	Serbia	2012–2015	194	120	74	.619	2 Serbian Leagues; 1 ABA League
28	Petar Božić	Serbia	2015–2016	18	6	12	.333	
29	Aleksandar Džikić	Serbia	2016–2017	88	60	28	.682	
—	Miroslav Nikolić	Serbia	2017	22	7	15	.318	
30	Aleksandar Matović	Serbia	2017	1	0	1	.000	None
31	Nenad Čanak	Serbia	2017–2018	41	24	17	.585	1 Radivoj Korać Cup
—	Aleksandar Matović	Serbia	2018	1	0	1	.000	None
32	Andrea Trinchieri	Italy	2018–2020	87	62	25	.713	2 Radivoj Korać Cups; 1 ABA League Supercup
33	Vlado Šćepanović	Montenegro	2020	9	4	5	.444	
34	Milivoje Lazić	Serbia	2020	1	0	1	.000	
35	Sašo Filipovski	Slovenia	2020–2021	26	12	14	.462	
—	Aleksandar Matović	Serbia	2021	12	8	4	.667	
—	Željko Obradović	Serbia	2021–2025	379	206	173	.544	2 ABA League
36	Bogdan Karaičić	Serbia	2025	5	4	1	.800	1 Serbian League
37	Mirko Ocokoljić	Serbia	2025	7	5	2	.714	
38	Joan Peñarroya	Spain	2025–present	59	38	21	.644	

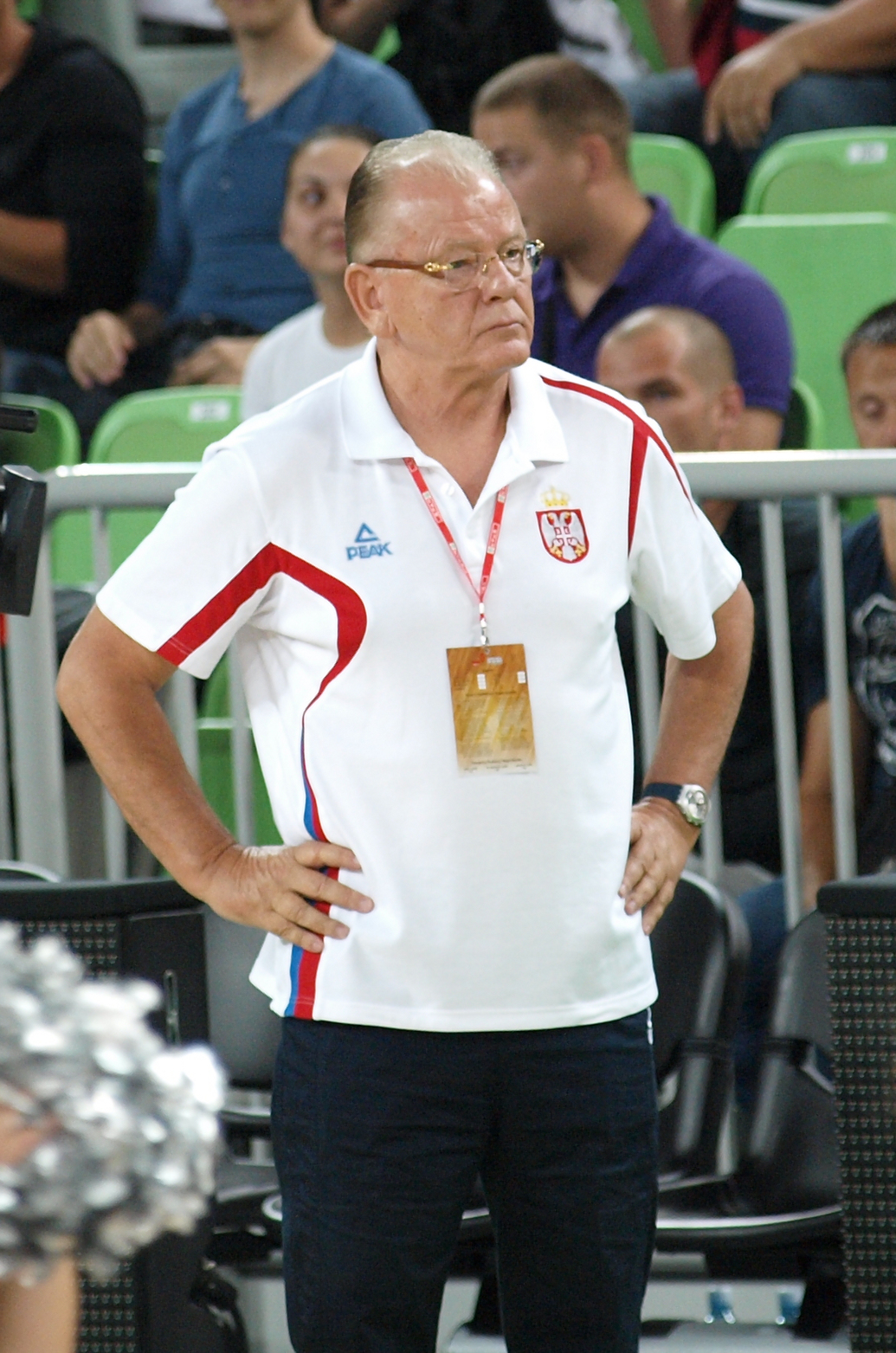
Dušan Ivković coached Partizan to a "small" Triple Crown in the 1978-79 season—winning the Yugoslav league and cup double in addition to the FIBA Korać Cup.

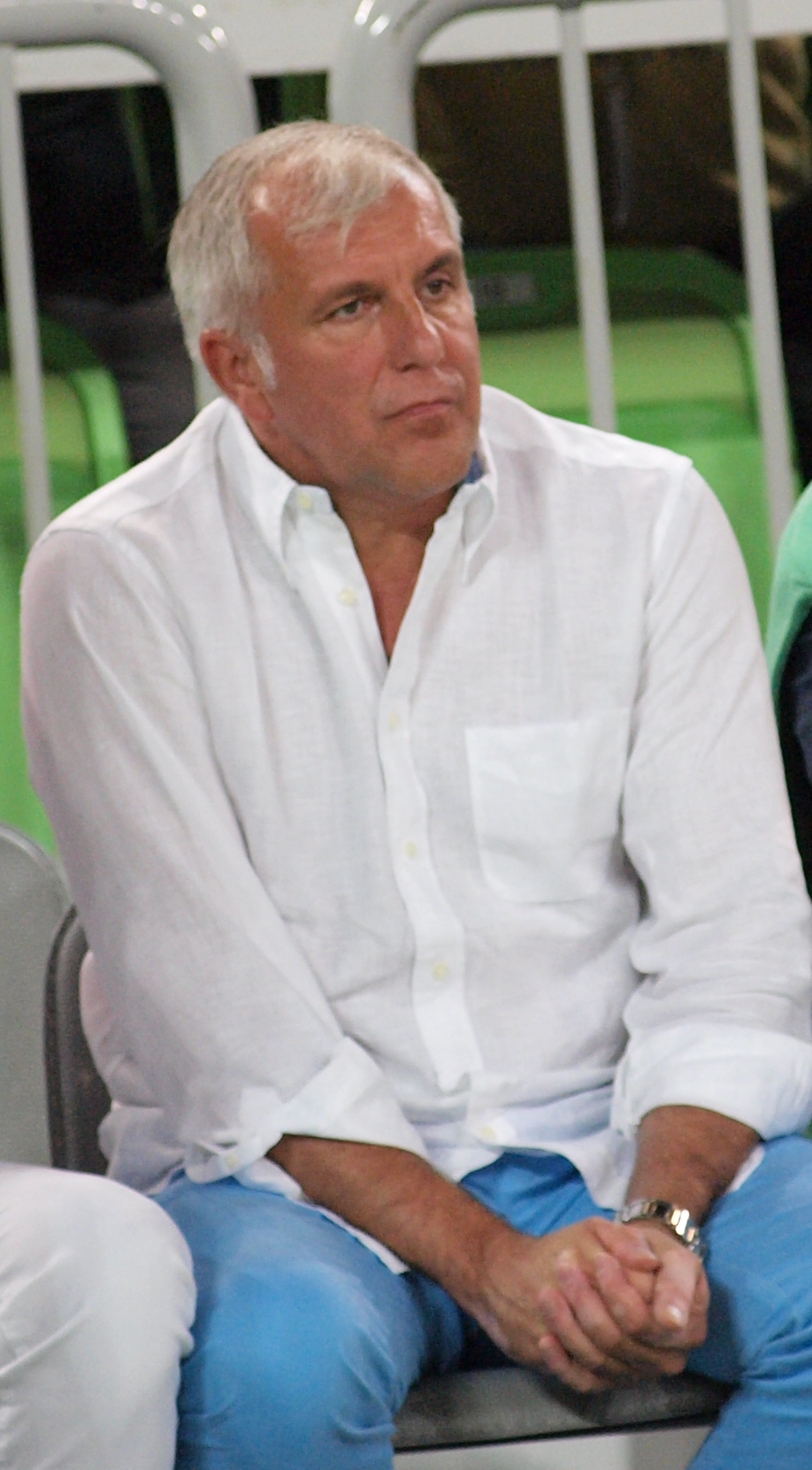
After playing for Partizan for seven seasons, mostly as back-up point guard, Željko Obradović coached the club to its biggest trophy—winning the 1991-92 European League at the 1992 Final Four in Istanbul. The same season, he additionally led the club to the Yugoslav league-cup double, thus achieving the Triple Crown.
