= OKK Beograd in international competitions =

OKK Beograd history and statistics in FIBA Europe and Euroleague Basketball (company) competitions.

== European competitions ==
Record	Round	Opponent club		
1958–59 FIBA European Champions Cup 1st–tier
4–2	2nd round	(Greece) AEK	84–76 a	121–53 h
4–2	QF	(France) Étoile Charleville-Mézières	73–75 a	87–74 h
4–2	SF	(Bulgaria) Academic	79–69 h	77–94 a
1960–61 FIBA European Champions Cup 1st–tier 1st–tier
2–2	1st round	(Sweden) KFUM Söder	53–50 a	89–48 h
2–2	2nd round	(Belgium) Antwerpse	47–66 a	00–02 h
1963–64 FIBA European Champions Cup 1st–tier 1st–tier
4–1	1st round	(Bulgaria) Academic	68–61 a	81–80 h
4–1	2nd round	(France) PUC	105–63; Paris	
4–1	QF	Bye	OKK qualified without games	
4–1	SF	(Czechoslovakia) Spartak ZJŠ Brno	103–94 h	75–85 a
1964–65 FIBA European Champions Cup 1st–tier 1st–tier
4–2	2nd round	(Sweden) Alvik	136–90 a	155–57 h
4–2	QF	(Greece) AEK	78–85 a	101–84 h
4–2	SF	(Spain) Real Madrid	61–84 a	113–96 h
1972 FIBA Korać Cup 3rd–tier 1st–tier
4–2	QF	(West Germany) USC München	79–71 a	83–46 h
4–2	SF	(France) Olympique Antibes	99–72 h	61–65 a
4–2	F	(Socialist Federal Republic of Yugoslavia) Lokomotiva	83–71, February 29, Hala sportova, Belgrade; 73–94, March 7, SFK Trešnjevci, Zagreb	
1977–78 FIBA Korać Cup 3rd–tier
4–4	1st round	(Austria) Progress Graz	115–67 h	80–81 a
4–4	Top 16	(Spain) Juventud Freixenet	71–85 a	77–95 h
4–4	Top 16	(Italy) Xerox Milano	83–97 a	85–83 h
4–4	Top 16	(West Germany) SSV Hagen	119–95 h	87–86 a

== Record ==
OKK Beograd has overall, from 1958–59 (first participation) to 1977–78 (last participation): 22 wins against 13 defeats in 35 games for all the European club competitions.

- EuroLeague: 14–7 (21)
  - FIBA Saporta Cup
    - FIBA Korać Cup: 8–6 (14)

== See also ==
- Yugoslav basketball clubs in European competitions
