= Velimir Gašić =

Serbian basketball coach

Personal information
- Born: 10 May 1964 (age 62) Aleksandrovac, SR Serbia, SFR Yugoslavia
- Position: Head coach
- Coaching career: 1984–2023

Career history

Coaching
- 1991–1993: Partizan (assistant)
- 1993–1995: Kikinda
- 1995–1996: Borac Banja Luka
- 1996–1998: Radnički Belgrade
- 1999–2001: Borac Banja Luka
- 2001–2003: Sloboda Dita
- 2005: Serbia and Montenegro university
- 2006–2007: Vojvodina Srbijagas
- 2007: Serbia (assistant)
- 2010: Metalac
- 2012–2015: Partizan (assistant)
- 2016–2017: Sloboda Tuzla
- 2020–2022: Sutjeska
- 2022–2023: Sloboda Užice

Career highlights
- As head coach: Bosnian League champion (2000); Bosnian Cup winner (2000); Republika Srpska League champion (1996); Republika Srpska Cup winner (1996); As assistant coach: EuroLeague champion (1992); Yugoslav League champion (1992); Yugoslav Cup winner (1992); ABA League champion (2013); 2× Serbian League champion (2013, 2014)
Medals
Men's basketball
Head Coach for Serbia and Montenegro
Universiade
| Bronze medal – third place | 2005 İzmir |
Assistant Coach for FR Yugoslavia
FIBA Under-21 World Cup
| Bronze medal – third place | 1997 Australia |

Velimir Gašić (Serbian Cyrillic: Велимир Гашић; born 10 May 1964) is a Serbian professional basketball coach. He was most recently the head coach of Sloboda Užice of the Basketball League of Serbia.

== Early life ==
Gašić was born in Aleksandrovac, SR Serbia, in 1964, but only a year later he moved to Rijeka, where his father get a job. He finished elementary and high school in Rijeka. earned his bachelor's degree in mechanical engineering from the University of Rijeka in 1986, and he also studied at the Faculty of Sport and Physical Education. He first studied under professor Aleksandar Nikolić at the University of Belgrade, and then graduated in the University of Sarajevo in 1985, at the basketball department.

== Coaching career ==
=== Youth system ===
Gašić began his coaching career in 1984 with Kvarner from Rijeka where he coached cadet and junior team. In 1989, he moved to Belgrade and became a coach of youth teams for Partizan.

=== Senior teams ===
In 1991, Gašić was named an assistant coach for Partizan, under head coach Željko Obradović. In the 1991–92 season, Partizan won the FIBA European League. Later, he coached Kikinda, the Bosnian team Borac Banja Luka, and Radnički Belgrade. In 1999, he moved back to Bosnia and Herzegovina where he was a head coach for Borac Banja Luka and Sloboda Dita Tuzla.

Gašić coached Serbian League teams Vojvodina Srbijagas during the 2006–07 season and Metalac during the first part of the 2010–11 season. In 2012, for the second time Gašić was named an assistant coach for Partizan, under head coach Duško Vujošević. During three seasons with Partizan he won the Adriatic League championship and two Serbian League championships.

On July 13, 2016, Gašić signed to be the head coach of the OKK Sloboda Tuzla. They parted ways in December 2017.

In July 2020, Gašić signed for the Montenegrin team Sutjeska. In March 2022, he parted ways with Sutjeska.

=== International teams ===
Gašić worked with the Serbia and Montenegro youth national teams from 2003 to 2005 and with Serbia youth national teams from 2007 to 2010. He was a head coach of the Serbia and Montenegro men's university team that won the gold medal at the 2005 Summer Universiade in İzmir, Turkey. Also, he was an assistant coach of the Serbia national team at the EuroBasket 2007.

== Career achievements ==
As a head coach

- Bosnia and Herzegovina League champion: 1 (with Borac Banja Luka: 1999–2000)
- First League of R Srpska champion: 1 (with Borac Banja Luka: 1995–96)
- Bosnian A1 League champion: 1 (with Sloboda Dita: 2001–02)

As an assistant coach

- EuroLeague champion: 1 (with Partizan: 1991–92)
- Adriatic League champion: 1 (with Partizan: 2012–13)
- Serbian League champion: 2 (with Partizan: 2012–13, 2013–14)
- Yugoslav League champion: 1 (with Partizan: 1991–92)
