= Miloš Bojović (basketball) =

Miloš Bojović (basketball) may also refer to:

- Miloš Bojović (born 1938) (1938–2001), Serbian basketball player
- Miloš Bojović (born 1981), Serbian basketball player
