= Božo Grkinić =

Yugoslav sportsperson

Personal information
- National team: Yugoslavia
- Born: 17 November 1913 Sveti Juraj, Croatia-Slavonia, Austria-Hungary
- Died: 3 February 1996 (aged 82) Belgrade, Serbia, FR Yugoslavia

Sport
- Sport: Water polo Basketball
- Updated on 10 June 2017

Božo Grkinić (Serbian Cyrillic: Божо Гркинић; November 17, 1913 – February 3, 1996) was Yugoslav water polo and basketball player and coach. He was a member of the Yugoslavia national water polo team and Yugoslavia national basketball team.

== Water polo career ==
Božo Grkinić
Sport
- Sport: Water polo

Senior clubs
- Years: Team
- 1948–1949: Partizan
- 1949–195?: Mornar
National team
- Years: Team
- 1948: Yugoslavia

Grkinić competed with the national water polo team at the 1948 Summer Olympics in London. He was given the honour to carry the national flag of Yugoslavia at the opening ceremony of the 1948 Summer Olympics, becoming the sixth water polo player to be a flag bearer at the opening and closing ceremonies of the Olympics.

== Basketball career ==
Božo Grkinić
Career information
- Playing career: 1938–?
- Coaching career: 1945–1946

Career history

Coaching
- 1945–1946: Partizan

Grkinić was the first head coach of Partizan who coached them for two seasons, in 1945 and 1946 Yugoslav Basketball League.

As a player for the national basketball team Grkinić participated in 1947 European Championship in Prague, Czechoslovakia.

== See also ==
- Yugoslavia men's Olympic water polo team records and statistics
- List of KK Partizan head coaches
- Nebojša Popović
