= Nenad Trajković (basketball) =

Serbian basketball coach (born 1961)

Virtus Bologna
- Position: Assistant coach
- League: LBA; EuroLeague

Personal information
- Born: 10 February 1961 (age 65) Belgrade, PR Serbia, FPR Yugoslavia
- Coaching career: 1987–present

Career history

Coaching
- 1987–1988: Partizan (assistant)
- 1989–1990: Borac Čačak
- 1990–1991, 1992–1995: Partizan (assistant)
- 1995–1996: Sloga
- 1999–2001: Partizan
- 2003–2004: Banjalučka pivara
- 2003: Iran
- 2005–2009: Cleveland Cavaliers (scout)
- 2006: Real Madrid (assistant)
- 2006–2007: Dynamo Moscow (assistant)
- 2008: Latvia
- 2009: Lottomatica Roma (assistant)
- 2010–2011: Phoenix Suns (assistant)
- 2011: Krka
- 2012–2013: Verviers-Pepinster
- 2014–2015: Bosnia and Herzegovina (assistant)
- 2018: Igokea
- 2019–2021: Studentski center
- 2025: Pelister
- 2025–present: Virtus Bologna (assistant)

Career highlights
- ABA League Second Division champion (2021); Yugoslav Cup winner (2000); Slovenian Supercup winner (2012)
Medals
Men's basketball
Representing Yugoslavia
Summer Universiade
Silver medal – second place	1999 Palma de Mallorca	Team competition

Nenad Trajković (Serbian Cyrillic: Ненад Трајковић; born Naser Trajković; 10 February 1961), is a Serbian basketball coach.

== Early life ==
Naser Trajković (Serbian Cyrillic: Насер Трајковић) was born in Belgrade, SR Serbia, SFR Yugoslavia. Later he changed his first name to Nenad.

== Coaching career ==
Trajković started his coaching career as an assistant coach for Partizan, where he had three stints from 1987 to 1995. He worked under the Partizan's head coaches Duško Vujošević, Željko Obradović, Željko Lukajić, Borislav Džaković and Ranko Žeravica. Trajković coached Serbian teams Borac Čačak, Sloga and Partizan. In the 1999–2000 season, he won Yugoslav Basketball Cup for Partizan.

In 2003, Trajković went abroad. He was a head coach for Banjalučka pivara (Bosnia and Herzegovina), Krka (Slovenia) and Verviers-Pepinster (Belgium). He also worked as an assistant coach for Real Madrid (Spain), Dynamo Moscow (Russia) and Lottomatica Roma (Italy). In 2010–11 season, he was an assistant coach for the NBA team Phoenix Suns.

Trajković also worked as a scout for the Cleveland Cavaliers in 2005.

On July 14, 2018, Trajković became a head coach for Igokea. On November 5, 2018, he left Igokea. In September 2019, Trajković became a head coach for Studentski centar of the Montenegrin League. In June 2020, he signed a three-year contract extension for Studentski centar. He left Studentski centar after the 2020–21 season.

=== International teams ===
Trajković coached Yugoslavia men's university team that won the silver medal at the 1999 Summer Universiade in Palma de Mallorca, Spain.

Trajković worked with the Yugoslavia youth national teams in 1998 and 2000. He coached the Yugoslavian University man national team in 1999 at Palma de Mallorca, FR Yugoslavia U–20 team at the 2000 FIBA Europe Under-20 Championship.

Trajković was a head coach of the Iran national team and Latvia national team. Also, he was an assistant coach of the Bosnia and Herzegovina national team at the EuroBasket 2015.

== Career achievements ==
As a head coach

- ABA League Second Division champion: 1 (with Studentski centar: 2020–21)
- Yugoslav Cup winner: 1 (with Partizan: 1999–2000)
- Slovenian Supercup winner: 1 (with Krka: 2011–12)

As an assistant coach

- Yugoslav League champion: 2 (with Partizan: 1986–87, 1994–95)
- Yugoslav Cup winner: 2 (with Partizan: 1993–94, 1994–95)

== See also ==
- List of Serbian NBA coaches
- List of foreign NBA coaches
- List of KK Partizan head coaches
- Nasser (name)
