= Darko Ruso =

Serbian basketball coach

Personal information
- Born: 28 March 1962 (age 64)

Career information
- Position: Head coach
- Coaching career: 1994–present

Career history

Coaching
- 1994–2000: Beobanka
- 2000–2001: Partizan
- 2001: Hemofarm
- 2002: Budućnost
- 2002–2005: Apollon Patras
- 2006–2007: Maroussi
- 2008–2010: Serbia (assistant)
- 2009: Igokea
- 2010–2011: Iraklis Thessaloniki
- 2011–2012: Khimik
- 2013–2016: Vienna
- 2021–2022: Astana
- 2022–2023: Avtodor
Medals
Men's basketball
Head coach for FR Yugoslavia
FIBA 22 & Under World Championship
| Bronze medal – third place | 1997 Australia | Under-21 |
Assistant coach for FR Yugoslavia
EuroBasket
| Bronze medal – third place | 1999 France |

Darko Ruso (Serbian Cyrillic: Дарко Русо; born 28 March 1962) is a Serbian professional basketball coach.

== Coaching career ==
In June 2021, Astana hired Ruso as their new head coach. He left Astana in March 2022.

== See also ==
- List of KK Partizan head coaches
