= Athletic Genova =

Italian basketball club

- Founded: 1968
- Arena: PalaCus viale Gambaro
- Capacity: 800
- Location: Genoa, Italy
- Team colors: Green, White
- President: Cav. Gianluigi Prati
Home	Away

Athletic Genova is an Italian basketball club from Genoa.

== History ==
Athletic was founded in 1968 in the premises of the parish in San Pio X avenue, where there was also the registered office, at the hands of Gino Negro, Elio Fertonani and Don Gianni Tacchino. In 1970 came the transition to competition by acquiring the rights of the then Legislative Genoa, which at the time was involved in the Serie C.

The 1974–75 season is the first held in a professional league, following the total reform of the championships. Athletic Genova, license plate Ausonia, is led on the bench by Luciano Bertolassi while the foreign was Wilbur Kirkland. He came the salvation as well as at the end of the second year, but only after the return match in the play-off against Juventus Caserta. Since 1976 the Genoese training assumes sponsorship Emerson and enters the orbit of famous Pallacanestro Varese, bringing in Lombardy veteran Dodo Rusconi and young Maurizio Gualco, Enzo Carraria and Mauro Salvaneschi: foreign player was instead represented by Brazilian Marcos Leite "Marquinho" . The results they guaranteed the club its first historic promotion to the top flight. The impact with the A1 however, was not as hoped, and the Emerson retreated with assets of 6 wins and 16 defeats. That season, which also saw the debut in FIBA Korać Cup, was the last of Athletic Genova season since the end of the season the team moved to Novara (coming Manner license plate) for the lack of a suitable system, not receiving from the Municipality the guarantees system use of previously used Fair.

Fresh displacement in Novara, the club went from professional basketball at the first year after suffering a further relegation.

After that period, the club continued competing at the regional level, achieving its best result with a fourth-place finish in the Regional Championship Series C in the mid-1990s. Its youth sector, consistently thriving, has produced many players who now compete in top Ligurian teams or have played in national leagues, including Fabrizio Greco, Stefano Arrighi, Andrea Fertonani, Nicholas Cerboncini, Francesco Rovati, Marcello Mangione, Philip Cainero, and Daniele Manuelli. Currently, the team is part of the Riviera Basketball network and collaborates with Basket Pool Loano 2000, competing at the top level in the Under-17 Open Ligure championship. The club's headquarters remain at the historic Via San Pio X, with its adjoining small gym in the church of the same name, while games are now held at the PalaCus on Viale Gambaro.

== Bibliography ==
- Franco Carozzi, La leggenda del grande basket sotto la Lanterna, Fratelli Frilli Editori, 2006.
