= 1996–97 Olympiacos B.C. season =

Basketball team season

In the 1996–97 season Olympiacos became the 8th club in the history of European Basketball and also the 1st club in the history of Greek basketball that made the Triple Crown achievement having won the Greek Basketball Cup, the FIBA EuroLeague and the Greek Basket League.

== The roster ==
- (Greece) Efthimis Bakatsias 4.
- (Greece) Giorgos Sigalas 5.
- (Greece) Dimitrios Papanikolaou 7.
- (Greece) Nasos Galakteros 8.
- (Croatia) (Greece) Franko Nakić 9.
- (Greece) Panagiotis Fasoulas 10.
- (Federal Republic of Yugoslavia) (Greece) Milan Tomić 11.
- (Federal Republic of Yugoslavia) (Greece) Dragan Tarlać 12.
- (Germany) Chris Welp 13.
- (Russia) (Greece) Aleksey Savrasenko 14.
- (United States) David Rivers 15. (Final Four MVP)
- (Greece) Vassilis Soulis
- (Russia) (Greece) Anatoly Zourpenko

- Coach: (Federal Republic of Yugoslavia) Dušan Ivković

== Greek Cup ==
=== 2nd round ===
Team 1	Score	Team 2
Peiraikos	59–88	Olympiacos

=== Top 16 ===
Team 1	Score	Team 2
Aris	47–58	Olympiacos

=== Quarterfinals ===
Team 1	Score	Team 2
Nikas Peristeri	58–78	Olympiacos

=== Semifinals ===
April 12, O.A.C.A. Olympic Indoor Hall, Athens

Team 1	Score	Team 2
Olympiacos	63–61	AEK

=== Final ===
April 13, O.A.C.A. Olympic Indoor Hall, Athens

Team 1	Score	Team 2
Olympiacos	80–78	Apollon Patras Dexim

== FIBA EuroLeague ==
=== 1st round ===
Day 1, 19/09/1996

Team 1	Score	Team 2
Olympiacos (Greece)	64–67	(Germany) Alba Berlin

Day 2, 26/09/1996

Team 1	Score	Team 2
Olympiacos (Greece)	96–80	(Italy) Teamsystem Bologna

Day 3, 03/10/1996

Team 1	Score	Team 2
Spirou (Belgium)	72–79	(Greece) Olympiacos

Day 4, 10/10/1996

Team 1	Score	Team 2
Olympiacos (Greece)	62–61	(Croatia) Cibona

Day 5, 17/10/1996

Team 1	Score	Team 2
Olympiacos (Greece)	110–78	(Spain) Estudiantes Argentaria

Day 6, 06/11/1996

Team 1	Score	Team 2
Alba Berlin (Germany)	62–61	(Greece) Olympiacos

Day 7, 13/11/1996

Team 1	Score	Team 2
Teamsystem Bologna (Italy)	81–72	(Greece) Olympiacos

Day 8, 21/11/1996

Team 1	Score	Team 2
Olympiacos (Greece)	87–60	(Belgium) Spirou

Day 9, 05/12/1996

Team 1	Score	Team 2
Cibona (Croatia)	63–61	(Greece) Olympiacos

Day 10, 12/12/1996

Team 1	Score	Team 2
Estudiantes Argentaria (Spain)	87–78	(Greece) Olympiacos

	Team	Pld	W	L	PF	PA	Diff
1.	(Italy) Teamsystem Bologna	10	7	3	773	742	+31
2.	(Spain) Estudiantes Argentaria	10	6	4	798	821	-23
3.	(Croatia) Cibona	10	6	4	713	679	+34
4.	(Germany) Alba Berlin	10	6	4	755	723	+22
5.	(Greece) Olympiacos	10	5	5	770	711	+59
6.	(Belgium) Spirou	10	0	10	699	832	-133

=== 2nd round ===
Day 1, 09/01/1997

Team 1	Score	Team 2
Olympiacos (Greece)	82–51	(Russia) CSKA Moscow

Day 2, 16/01/1997

Team 1	Score	Team 2
Stefanel Milano (Italy)	73–71	(Greece) Olympiacos

Day 3, 13/01/1997

Team 1	Score	Team 2
Olympiacos (Greece)	69–60	(Israel) Maccabi Tel Aviv

Day 4, 06/02/1997

Team 1	Score	Team 2
CSKA Moscow (Russia)	70–79	(Greece) Olympiacos

Day 5, 13/11/1996

Team 1	Score	Team 2
Olympiacos (Greece)	87–84	(Italy) Stefanel Milano

Day 6, 21/11/1996

Team 1	Score	Team 2
Maccabi Tel Aviv (Israel)	82–78	(Greece) Olympiacos

	Team	Pld	W	L	PF	PA	Diff
1.	(Italy) Stefanel Milano	16	11	5	1234	1175	+59
2.	(Germany) Alba Berlin	16	10	6	1193	1167	+26
3.	(Greece) Olympiacos	16	9	7	1236	1131	+105
4.	(Israel) Maccabi Tel Aviv	16	9	7	1209	1173	+32
5.	(Russia) CSKA Moscow	16	8	8	1178	1175	+3
6.	(Belgium) Spirou	16	1	15	1123	1297	-174

=== Top 16 ===
Team 1	Agg.	Team 2	1st leg	2nd leg	3rd leg
Partizan (Federal Republic of Yugoslavia)	1–2	(Greece) Olympiacos	71–81	61–60	69–74

=== Quarterfinals ===
Team 1	Agg.	Team 2	1st leg	2nd leg	3rd leg
Panathinaikos (Greece)	0–2	(Greece) Olympiacos	49–69	57–65	

=== Final Four ===
==== Semifinals ====
April 22, Palaeur, Rome

Team 1	Score	Team 2
Olympiacos (Greece)	74–65	(Slovenia) Smelt Olimpija

==== Final ====
April 24, Palaeur, Rome

Team 1	Score	Team 2
Olympiacos (Greece)	73–58	(Spain) Banca Catalana FC Barcelona

1996–97 FIBA EuroLeague Champions

Olympiacos
1st Title
