= Mirko Marjanović (basketball) =

Serbian basketball player and coach

Personal information
- Born: 2 May 1926
- Died: 1999
- Listed height: 1.92 m (6 ft 4 in)

Career information
- Playing career: 1945–1957
- Position: Center
- Number: 4, 12
- Coaching career: 1954–1957

Career history

Playing
- 1945: Yugoslav Army
- 1946–1957: Partizan
- 1951: → Crvena zvezda

Coaching
- 1954–1957: Partizan

Career highlights
- As player: Yugoslav League champion (1945)

Mirko Marjanović (Serbian Cyrillic: Мирко Марјановић; 2 May 1926 – 1999) was the Serbian basketball player and coach. He represented the Yugoslavia national basketball team internationally.

== Playing career ==
Marjanović played for Belgrade-based teams the Yugoslav Army and Partizan of the Yugoslav First League. In the 1945 season, he won the Yugoslav Championships with the Yugoslav Army.

In June 1951, Marjanović played two games for Crvena zvezda at an international cup tournament in Milan, Italy. On 18 June, he recorded 10 points in a 46–35 loss to Borletti Milano. On the following day, he recorded 17 points in a 54–24 win over Ginnastica Roma.

== National team career ==
Marjanović was a member of the Yugoslavia national basketball team at the 1947 FIBA European Championship in Prague, Czechoslovakia. Over five tournament games, he averaged 9.2 points per game. At the 1953 FIBA European Championship in Moscow, the Soviet Union, he averaged 6.5 points per game over eleven tournament games.

Marjanović was a Yugoslav team member at the 1954 FIBA World Championship in Rio de Janeiro, Brazil. Over five tournament games, he averaged 4.2 points per game.

== Coaching career ==
As player-coach, Marjanović coached Partizan for the last four seasons while he played for them.

== Coaching record ==
Legend
W	Wins	L	Losses	D	Draws	W%	Winning percentage

=== Yugoslav First Men's Basketball League ===
Season	Team	Games	W	D	L	W %	Result
1954	Partizan	22	12	2	8	.545	5th
1955	Partizan	18	10	2	6	.556	3rd
1956	Partizan	18	10	4	4	.556	3rd
1957	Partizan	18	6	1	11	.333	7th
Career		76	38	9	29	.500	

== See also ==
- List of KK Partizan head coaches
