= Marko Šćekić =

Bosnian-born Serbian basketball player

Borac Banja Luka
- Title: Staff member
- League: Bosnian Championship

Personal information
- Born: May 23, 1981 (age 45) Zvornik, SR Bosnia and Herzegovina, Yugoslavia
- Listed height: 2.06 m (6 ft 9 in)
- Listed weight: 95 kg (209 lb)

Career information
- NBA draft: 2003: undrafted
- Playing career: 1998–2015, 2019
- Position: Power forward
- Number: 4, 7
- Coaching career: 2015–present

Career history

Playing
- 1998–2000: Drina Zvornik
- 2000–2004: Borac BL / Banjalučka pivara
- 2004–2007: Vojvodina Srbijagas
- 2007–2008: Turów Zgorzelec
- 2008–2010: EWE Baskets Oldenburg
- 2010–2011: Budućnost
- 2011–2013: Mapooro Cantù
- 2013–2014: Cimberio Varese
- 2014: Igokea
- 2015: Helios Suns Domžale
- 2015: Jedinstvo Bijelo Polje
- 2019: Borac Banja Luka

Coaching
- 2015–2016: Igokea (assistant)
- 2018–2019: Borac Banja Luka (assistant)
- 2019–2020: Borac Banja Luka
Medals
Men's basketball
Representing Serbia and Montenegro
Universiade
Bronze medal – third place	2005 İzmir	Team

Marko Šćekić (born May 23, 1981) is a Bosnia-born Serbian professional basketball coach and former player who is a staff member of Borac Banja Luka of the Basketball Championship of Bosnia and Herzegovina.

== Professional career ==
A 6 ft 9 in (2.06 m) power forward, Šćekić played for Drina Zvornik, Borac Banja Luka, Vojvodina Srbijagas, Turów Zgorzelec, EWE Baskets Oldenburg, Budućnost, and Mapooro Cantù. On August 3, 2013, Šćekić signed with Cimberio Varese. In September 2014, he signed an open-contract with Igokea. In early November 2014, Igokea released him. In March 2014, he signed with the Slovenian club Helios Suns Domžale. He retired as a player with Jedinstvo Bijelo Polje in 2015.

In February 2019, Šćekić came out of retirement and signed for Borac Banja Luka for the rest of the 2018–19 season. He was an assistant coach for Borac at the time.

== National team career ==
Šćekić was a member of the Serbia and Montenegro university team that won a bronze medal at the 2005 Summer Universiade in İzmir, Turkey.

== Coaching career ==
After retirement in 2015, Šćekić joined was hired as an assistant coach for Igokea. Afterward, he was an assistant coach for Borac Banja Luka before he was hired as the new head coach for Borac Banja Luka in May 2019. In December 2020, Šćekić got fired as the head coach of Borac.

== Career achievements ==
As player

- German League champion: 1 (with EWE Baskets Oldenburg: 2008–09)
- Montenegrin League champion: 1 (with Budućnost: 2010–11)
- German Super Cup winner: 1 (with EWE Baskets Oldenburg: 2009)
- Montenegro Cup winner: 1 (with Budućnost: 2010–11)

As head coach

- First League of R Srpska champion: 1 (with Borac: 2019–20)
