= Radovan Radović (basketball) =

Serbian basketball player and coach (1936–2022)

Personal information
- Born: 19 January 1936 Kučevo, Kingdom of Yugoslavia
- Died: 25 August 2022 (aged 86) Belgrade, Serbia
- Listed height: 1.87 m (6 ft 2 in)
- Listed weight: 92 kg (203 lb)

Career information
- Playing career: 1954–1968
- Position: Center
- Number: 13
- Coaching career: 1969–1981

Career history

Playing
- 1954–1957: BSK
- 1957–1968: Partizan

Coaching
- 1969–1971: Partizan
Medals
Men's basketball
Representing Yugoslavia
EuroBasket
| Silver medal – second place | 1961 Yugoslavia | Team |
Mediterranean Games
| Gold medal – first place | 1959 Lebanon | Team |
| Bronze medal – third place | 1963 Italy | Team |

Radovan "Bata" Radović (Serbian Cyrillic: Рaдовaн Рaдовић; 19 January 1936 – 25 August 2022) was a Serbian basketball player and coach. He represented the Yugoslavia national basketball team internationally.

== Playing career ==
Radović played for two Belgrade teams the BSK and the Partizan in Yugoslav First League.

He started his basketball career playing with the youth teams of the BSK. In 1954, he was promoted to first team. Few years later he moved to Partizan where he has played for Partizan from 1957 to 1968, missed only 1964 season due to the compulsory military service. In 1963, he recorded a career-high 48 points in a game.

== National team career ==
As a player for the Yugoslavia national basketball team Radović participated at the 1960 Summer Olympics in Rome and at the EuroBasket 1961 in Belgrade where he won a silver medal. He participated at the EuroBasket 1959 in Turkey. Also, he won a gold medal at the 1959 Mediterranean Games in Lebanon and bronze medal at the 1963 Mediterranean Games in Italy.

Radović was a flag bearer for Yugoslavia at the 1960 Summer Olympics in Rome, Italy.

== Coaching career ==
Radović coached the Partizan Belgrade of the Yugoslav First League in 1969–70 and 1970–71 season. During his military service in Kraljevo in 1964, he briefly trained a future star Ljubodrag Simonović.

== See also ==
- List of KK Partizan head coaches
- List of flag bearers for Yugoslavia at the Olympics
- KK Partizan accomplishments and records
