= 2002–03 ABA Goodyear League =

2002–03 ABA Goodyear League season
- League: ABA Goodyear League
- Sport: Basketball
- Teams: Croatia (4 teams); Slovenia (3 teams); Bosnia and Herzegovina (3 teams); Israel (1 team); Serbia and Montenegro (1 team)

Regular season
- Season champions: (Serbia and Montenegro) Crvena zvezda
- Season MVP: (United States) Kenyan Weaks (Pivovarna Laško)
- Top scorer: (United States) Kenyan Weaks (Pivovarna Laško) (20.14 ppg)

Final 4
- Champions: (Croatia) Zadar

ABA Goodyear League seasons
- ← 2001–02 2003–04 →

12 teams from Bosnia and Herzegovina, Croatia, Israel, Slovenia, and FR Yugoslavia participated in Goodyear League in its second season: Union Olimpija, Krka, Pivovarna Laško, Cibona VIP, Zadar, Zagreb, Split Croatia Osiguranje, FEAL Široki, Bosna ASA, Borac Nektar, Maccabi Tel Aviv, and Crvena zvezda.

There were 22 rounds played in the regular part of the season, best four teams qualified for the Final Four Tournament which was played in Ljubljana since April 3 until April 5, 2003. According to the original plan the Final Tournament was to be played in Tel Aviv, but due to the deteriorating security situation there at that time, the tournament got moved to Ljubljana. Crvena Zvezda finished top of the table in regular season, although the club didn't play its last round match against Maccabi, since the Israeli club didn't travel to Belgrade due to the state of emergency proclaimed following the March 2003 assassination of Serbian prime minister Zoran Đinđić. ABA awarded the game to Crvena Zvezda. In first match in Tel Aviv Crvena Zvezda defeated Maccabi.

Zadar became the 2003 Goodyear League champion.

== Regular season ==
Pos	Team	Pld	W	L	PF	PA	PD	Pts	Qualification or relegation
1	Crvena zvezda	22	17	5	1828	1648	+180	39	Qualified for Final four
2	Maccabi Elite Tel Aviv	22	17	5	1887	1629	+258	39	Qualified for Final four
3	Union Olimpija	22	17	5	1812	1647	+165	39	Qualified for Final four
4	Zadar	22	14	8	1963	1891	+72	36	Qualified for Final four
5	Cibona VIP	22	13	9	1808	1695	+113	35	
6	Zagreb	22	11	11	1758	1861	−103	33	
7	Krka	22	11	11	1806	1738	+68	33	
8	Pivovarna Laško	22	9	13	1717	1784	−67	31	
9	FEAL Široki	22	9	13	1745	1773	−28	31	
10	Split CO	22	7	15	1747	1877	−130	29	
11	Borac Nektar	22	6	16	1824	1902	−78	28	
12	Bosna ASA	22	1	21	1662	2112	−450	23	Relegated

== Final four ==
Matches played at Hala Tivoli, Ljubljana

Semifinals; April 3.
1	Crvena zvezda	77
4	Zadar	78
2	Maccabi Elite Tel Aviv	82
3	Union Olimpija	76

Final; April 5.
4	Zadar	91
2	Maccabi Elite Tel Aviv	88

2002–03 ABA Godyear League Champions
Zadar
1st title

== Stats leaders ==
=== Ranking MVP ===
Rank	Name	Team	Efficiency	Games	Average
1.	(United States) Kenyan Weaks	(Slovenia) Pivovarna Laško	403	21	19.19
2.	(Serbia and Montenegro) Dragan Aleksić	(Bosnia and Herzegovina) Borac Nektar	351	19	18.47
3.	(United States) Jamie Arnold	(Slovenia) Krka	331	18	18.39
4.	(Croatia) Marko Popović	(Croatia) Zadar	389	22	17.68
5.	(Croatia) Gordan Zadravec	(Bosnia and Herzegovina) FEAL Široki	368	21	17.52

=== Points ===
Rank	Name	Team	Points	Games	PPG
1.	(United States) Kenyan Weaks	(Slovenia) Pivovarna Laško	420	21	20.00
2.	(Serbia and Montenegro) Dragan Aleksić	(Bosnia and Herzegovina) Borac Nektar	375	19	19.74
3.	(Croatia) Gordan Zadravec	(Bosnia and Herzegovina) FEAL Široki	497	21	19.38
4.	(United States) Jamie Arnold	(Slovenia) Krka	332	18	18.44
5.	(Croatia) Marko Popović	(Croatia) Zadar	394	22	17.91

=== Rebounds ===
Rank	Name	Team	Rebounds	Games	RPG
1.	(Croatia) Andrija Žižić	(Croatia) Split CO	148	18	8.22
2.	(Croatia) Nikša Tarle	(Bosnia and Herzegovina) Bosna ASA	158	20	7.90
3.	(Croatia) Hrvoje Perinčić	(Croatia) Zadar	149	21	7.10
4.	(United States) Jamie Arnold	(Slovenia) Krka	125	18	6.94
5.	(Bosnia and Herzegovina) Haris Mujezinović	(Croatia) Cibona VIP	129	19	6.79

=== Assists ===
Rank	Name	Team	Assists	Games	APG
1.	(Croatia) Ivan Tomas	(Croatia) Zagreb	128	22	5.82
2.	(Croatia) Marko Popović	(Croatia) Zadar	104	22	4.73
3.	(Serbia and Montenegro) Dragan Aleksić	(Bosnia and Herzegovina) Borac Nektar	89	19	4.68
4.	(Croatia) Mladen Erjavec	(Croatia) Zadar	106	23	4.61
5.	(United States) Scoonie Penn	(Serbia and Montenegro) Crvena zvezda	88	22	4.00

Source: Adriatic League
