= Božidar Munćan =

Basketball player and basketball coach

Personal information
- Born: 1925
- Died: 1990 (aged 64–65)

Career information
- Playing career: 1942–1953
- Position: Guard
- Number: 15
- Coaching career: 1962–1963

Career history

Playing
- 1942: BASK
- 1945: Yugoslav Army
- 1946–1953: Partizan

Coaching
- 1962–1963: Partizan

Career highlights
- As player: Yugoslav League champion (1945)

Božidar "Boža" Munćan was a Serbian basketball player and coach. He represented the Yugoslavia national basketball team internationally.

== Playing career ==
Munćan played for Belgrade-based teams Yugoslav Army and Partizan of the Yugoslav First League. During the 1945 season with Yugoslav Army, he won the National Championships.

== National team career ==
Munćan was a member of the Yugoslavia national team which participated at the 1947 FIBA European Championship in Prague, Czechoslovakia. Over two tournament games, he averaged 1.0 point per game.

== Coaching career ==
Munćan coached Partizan for two seasons in the Yugoslav First League where he compiled a 21–15 record.

== Career achievements and awards ==
- Yugoslav League champion: 1 (with Yugoslav Army: 1945).

== Coaching record ==
Legend
W	Wins	L	Losses	W%	Winning percentage

=== Yugoslav First Men's Basketball League ===
Season	Team	Games	W	L	W %	Result
1962	Partizan	18	9	9	.500	6th
1963	Partizan	18	12	6	.667	Runner-up
Career		36	21	15	.583	

== See also ==
- List of KK Partizan head coaches
