= Yugoslav Army (basketball team) =

- Leagues: Yugoslav First Basketball League
- Founded: 1944
- Dissolved: 1946
- Location: Belgrade, Yugoslavia
- Team colors: Blue, White, Red
- Head coach: (Socialist Federal Republic of Yugoslavia) Ratko Vlahović (last)
- Ownership: Yugoslav People's Army
- Championships: 1 Championship

Yugoslav Army (Serbian: Југословенска армија, romanized: Jugoslovenska armija) was a men's basketball selection based in Belgrade, Yugoslavia. It was the basketball section of the Sports Association of the Central House of the Yugoslav Army. The Yugoslav Army later founded KK Partizan and most of the players moved to the new club.

== 1945 season ==
Team won the first Yugoslav Basketball League in 1945 against state selections of the Yugoslav states.

=== Roster ===
Yugoslav Army basketball team roster
Players
Coaches

Pos.	No.	Nat.	Name	Ht.
		(Socialist Federal Republic of Yugoslavia)	Alagić, Strahinja
		(Socialist Federal Republic of Yugoslavia)	Dekleva, Lučano
		(Socialist Federal Republic of Yugoslavia)	Kostić, Pavle
	9	(Socialist Federal Republic of Yugoslavia)	Kovačević, Zlatko
C	4	(Socialist Federal Republic of Yugoslavia)	Marjanović, Mirko	1.92 m (6 ft 4 in)
	15	(Socialist Federal Republic of Yugoslavia)	Munćan, Božidar
F		(Socialist Federal Republic of Yugoslavia)	Nikolić, Aleksandar	1.73 m (5 ft 8 in)
		(Socialist Federal Republic of Yugoslavia)	Pikoli, Atilio
		(Socialist Federal Republic of Yugoslavia)	Tijanić, Ratko
		(Socialist Federal Republic of Yugoslavia)	Vlahović, Ratko

Head coach

- (Socialist Federal Republic of Yugoslavia) Ratko Vlahović
  (player-coach)

Legend

- (C) Team captain
- Injured

=== Matches ===
Win Loss

1945 Semifinals	Yugoslav Army	41–24	PR Croatia	Subotica
		Report

1945 Final	Yugoslav Army	21–18	PR Serbia	Subotica
		Report

== Trophies ==
- Yugoslav League: (1)
  - 1945

== Aftermath ==
The Yugoslav Army established Partizan on 4 October 1945. Marjanović, Kovačević, Munćan, Nikolić, Alagić, Kostić and Vlahović played for Partizan during the 1946 season.
