= Kenyan Weaks =

American basketball player (born 1977)

Personal information
- Born: August 13, 1977 (age 49) Concord, North Carolina, U.S.
- Listed height: 6 ft 6 in (1.98 m)

Career information
- High school: Concord (Concord, North Carolina); Fork Union Military Academy (Fork Union, Virginia)
- College: Florida (1996–2000)
- NBA draft: 2000: undrafted
- Playing career: 2000–2007
- Position: Small forward / shooting guard

Career history
- 2000–2001: Harlem Globetrotters
- 2001–2002: Fenerbahçe
- 2002–2003: Pivovarna Laško
- 2003–2004: Ionikos N.F.
- 2004–2005: Ironi Ashkelon
- 2005–2006: Lukoil Academic
- 2006–2007: Club Biguá

Career highlights
- Adriatic League MVP (2003); Adriatic League Top Scorer (2003)

Kenyan Weaks (born August 13, 1977) is a retired American professional basketball player. He is 6 ft 6 in (1.98m) shooting guard–small forward. He played for the University of Florida.

== Career ==
Weaks played for the University of Florida and ranked 2nd in his career for most three-pointer shots made in school history, having scored on 198 of them. He scored 1,234 points during his career. He set a school record with a .898 free-throw percentage. He played in 115 games throughout his career.

== Personal life ==
Weaks graduated from Concord High School in 1995 and signed with the University of Florida the same year. He was an assistant coach at Central Cabarrus High School until he was arrested in 2017 for alleged stalking, after which he resigned. USA Today High School Sports reported that the University of Florida had removed his biography from their website; another school where Weaks served as a coach also removed him from their website.
