= Drago Karalić =

Bosnian basketball coach (born 1965)

Mladi Krajišnik
- Position: Head coach
- League: Bosnian Women Championship

Personal information
- Born: 1965 (age 60–61)
- Coaching career: 1992–present

Career history

Coaching
- 1992–1993: Borac Borovica (assistant)
- Mladi Krajišnik
- Ruma
- ŽKK Bečej
- 1998–1999: Borac Nektar
- 2001: Igokea
- 2002–2003: Borac Nektar
- 2003, 2004–2006: Banjalučka pivara
- 2006–2007: Borac Nektar
- 2007–2008: Hercegovac
- 2008: Igokea Partizan
- 2008–2009: Hercegovac
- 2009–2010: Igokea
- 2010–2015: Borac Banja Luka
- 2015–2016: Varda HE
- 2017–present: Mladi Krajišnik

Drago Karalić (Serbian Cyrillic: Драго Каралић; born 1965) is a Bosnian professional basketball coach for Mladi Krajišnik of the Women Basketball Championship of Bosnia and Herzegovina.

== Coaching career ==
In December 2003, Karalić mutually agreed with Banjalučka pivara to part ways. In June 2004, he signed for Banjalučka pivara.

In September 2006, Karalić became the head coach of the newly formed Borac Nektar. In November 2007, he got fired.

In December 2007, Karalić became the head coach for Hercegovac. In May 2008, he signed with Igokea for the rest of the 2007–08 season after Zoran Sretenović got fired.

In June 2009, Karalić was named as the head coach of Igokea. In July 2010, he parted ways with Igorea and signed as the new head coach for OKK Borac. He left Borac after the end of the 2014–15 season.

In December 2015, Karalić was hired as the new head coach of Varda HE.

In 2017, Karalić signed for Mladi Krajišnik. On 24 July 2020, he signed a one-year contract extension for Mladi Krajišnik.

== Career achievements ==
- First League of Republika Srpska champion: 2 (with Borac: 1998–99; with Borac Nektar: 2006–07)
