= SKK Borac 1947 =

Basketball club in Banja Luka, Bosnia and Herzegovina

- Nickname: Pivari
- Leagues: Second League of Republika Srpska
- Founded: August 28, 1947; 78 years ago
- History: KK Borac; 1947–2003; SKK Banjalučka pivara 2003–2006; SKK Borac 1947; 2018–present
- Arena: Obilićevo Sports Hall
- Capacity: 400
- Location: Banja Luka, Bosnia and Herzegovina
- Team colors: Red and blue
- Championships: 1 National Championship; 1 National Cup
Home	Away

Srpski košarkaški klub Borac 1947 (Serbian Cyrillic: Српски кошаркашки клуб Бopaц 1947), commonly referred to as SKK Borac 1947, is a men's professional basketball club based in Banja Luka, Republika Srpska, Bosnia and Herzegovina. It is a part of the Borac Banja Luka Sports Society. They play in the 3rd-tier Second League of Republika Srpska, Western Division.

== Sponsorship naming ==
The club has had several denominations through the years due to its sponsorship:

- Borac Incel (1985–1992)
- Borac Borovica (1992–1993)
- Borac Nektar (1994–2003)
- Banjalučka pivara (2003–2006)

== Home arena ==
Borac 1947 played its home games at the Obilićevo Sports Hall. The hall is located in the Obilićevo Neighbourhood, Banja Luka, and was built in 1977. It has a seating capacity of 400 seats.

Between the 1970s and 2006, Borac and Banjalučka pivara played its home games at the Borik Sports Hall. The hall is located in the Borik Neighbourhood, Banja Luka, and was built in 1974. It has a seating capacity of 3,060 seats.

== Players ==
Former players

- (Bosnia and Herzegovina) Zoran Kukić
- (Bosnia and Herzegovina) Boris Blagojević
- (Serbia) Ivan Gemaljević
- (Serbia) Nenad Đorić
- (Serbia) Saša Vuleta
- (Bosnia and Herzegovina) Saša Vujasinović
- (Serbia) Vasilj Ševo
- (Bosnia and Herzegovina) Aleksandar Damjanović
- (Bosnia and Herzegovina) Marko Šćekić
- (Montenegro) Nikola Glišović
- (Croatia) Ante - Šjor Friganović
- (Bosnia and Herzegovina) Vladan Jocović
- (Serbia) Jovan Sirovina
- (Serbia) Miodrag Babić
- (Bosnia and Herzegovina) (Serbia) Ognjen Kuzmić
- (Bosnia and Herzegovina) Tibor Florjan
- (Serbia) Slađan Stojković
- (Serbia) Zoran Negovanović
- (Serbia) Dragan Aleksić
- (Bosnia and Herzegovina) Dragan Vuković
- (Bosnia and Herzegovina) Aleksandar Šućur
- (Bosnia and Herzegovina) Saša Anić
- (Bosnia and Herzegovina) Milorad Kovačević
- (United States) David Crouse
- (Serbia) Nenad Bukumirović
- (Bosnia and Herzegovina) Predrag Čubrilo
- (Bosnia and Herzegovina) Siniša Protić
- (Serbia) Nenad Pištoljević
- (Bosnia and Herzegovina) Feliks Kojadinović
- (Bosnia and Herzegovina) (Serbia) Marko Jagodić - Kuridža
- (Serbia) Zlatko Jovanović
- (Serbia) Vladimir Zujović
- (Bosnia and Herzegovina) Predrag Šaporac
- (Socialist Federal Republic of Yugoslavia) Veselin Marunić
- (Bosnia and Herzegovina) (Israel) Boris Kajmaković - Robert Rothbart
- (Bosnia and Herzegovina) Vladimir Arnautović
- (Croatia) Hrvoje Puljko
- (Serbia) Milan Janjušević
- (Montenegro) Zoran Marojević
- (Serbia) Aleksandar Matić
- (Bosnia and Herzegovina) Filip Adamović
- (Bosnia and Herzegovina) Nikola Đurasović
- (Croatia) Goran Starčević
- (Bosnia and Herzegovina) Dalibor Stupar
- (Bosnia and Herzegovina) Danilo Palalić
- (Montenegro) Ranko Velimirović
- (Bosnia and Herzegovina) Nikola Pejović
- (Bosnia and Herzegovina) Draško Albijanić
- (Bosnia and Herzegovina) Slobodan Plemić
- (Bosnia and Herzegovina) Bojan Milinović
- (Croatia) Joško Garma
- (Montenegro) Slobodan Tošić
- (Bosnia and Herzegovina) Gojko Rodić
- (Bosnia and Herzegovina) Tomica Zirojević
- (Serbia) Nenad Radojičić
- (United States) William Franklin
- (United States) Omari Peterkin
- (United States) Donta Richardson
- (United States) Jarrod West
- (Serbia) Nebojša Pavlović
- (Bosnia and Herzegovina) Vuk Bošković
- (Bosnia and Herzegovina) Draško Knežević
- (Bosnia and Herzegovina) Srđan Lončar
- (Bosnia and Herzegovina) Bojan Pelkić
- (Serbia) Miloš Mladenović
- (Montenegro) Nemanja Vranješ
- (Bosnia and Herzegovina) Igor Josipović
- (Montenegro) Maksim Šturanović
- (Serbia) Ognjen Milekić
- (Bosnia and Herzegovina) Stefan Fekete
- (Bosnia and Herzegovina) Miloš Trikić

== Head coaches ==
Borac (1947–2003)

- (Socialist Federal Republic of Yugoslavia) Đorđe Mikeš (1986)
- (Socialist Federal Republic of Yugoslavia) Borislav Džaković (1989)
- (Serbia and Montenegro) Miodrag Baletić (1992–1993)
- (Republika Srpska) Slobodan Simović (1994–1995)
- (Serbia and Montenegro) Velimir Gašić (1995–1996)
- (Serbia and Montenegro) Miodrag Baletić (1997–1998)
- (Bosnia and Herzegovina) Drago Karalić (1998–1999)
- (Federal Republic of Yugoslavia) Velimir Gašić (1999–2001)
- (Bosnia and Herzegovina) Drago Karalić (2002–2003)

Banjalučka pivara (2003–2006)

- (Bosnia and Herzegovina) Drago Karalić (2003)
- (Serbia) Nenad Trajković (2003–2004)
- (Serbia) Predrag Jaćimović (2004)
- (Bosnia and Herzegovina) Drago Karalić (2004–2006)

Borac 1947 (2018 onwards)

- (Bosnia and Herzegovina) Bojan Božić (2018–2021)

== Season-by-season ==
=== 1997–2006 ===
Season	Tier	Division	Pos.	Postseason	W–L	National Cup	Adriatic competitions			European competitions		
1997–98	1	First League of R Srpska		Champions		—	Unexist			—		
1998–99	1	First League of R Srpska		Champions		—	Unexist			3 Korać Cup	J3	4–4
1999–00	1	Bosnian Championship	C	Not played	7–3	Winners	Unexist			3 Korać Cup	1R	1–1
2000–01	1	Bosnian Championship	3	Not played	6–4	—	Unexist			2 Saporta Cup	T16	6–6
2001–02	1	Bosnian Championship	3	Not played	12–6	—	—			—		
2002–03	1	Bosnian Championship	2	Runners up	20–7	Runners up	ABA League	11	6–16	—		
2003–04	1	Bosnian Championship	3	—	6–4	—	ABA League	13	8–18	—		
2004–05	1	Bosnian Championship	5	—	17–11	—	—			—		
2005–06	1	Bosnian Championship	9	—	10–12	—	—			—		

=== 2018–present ===
Season	Tier	Division	Pos.	Postseason	W–L	National Cup	European competitions
2018–19	3	Second League of R Srpska – West	8	—	3–11	—	—
2019–20	3	Second League of R Srpska – West	6	Abd	8–6	—	—
2020–21	3	Second League of R Srpska – West B	3	—	7–2	—	—

== Trophies and awards ==
=== Trophies ===
- Championship of Bosnia and Herzegovina
  - Winners (1): 1999–2000
- Mirza Delibašić Cup
  - Winners (1): 1999–2000
- First League of Republika Srpska (2nd-tier)
  - Winners (7): 1993–94, 1994–95, 1995–96, 1996–97, 1997–98, 1998–99, 2001–02
- Republika Srpska Cup (2nd-tier)
  - Winners (7): 1993–94, 1994–95, 1995–96, 1996–97, 1997–98, 1998–99, 2001–02

== Notable players ==
- (Bosnia and Herzegovina) Aleksandar Damjanović
- (Bosnia and Herzegovina) Marko Šćekić
- (Serbia) Dragan Aleksić
- (Bosnia and Herzegovina) Feliks Kojadinović
- (Serbia) Zlatko Jovanović
- (Serbia) Vladimir Zujović
