= Vladimir Dragutinović =

Serbian basketball player and coach

Personal information
- Born: 20 June 1967 (age 59) Osijek, SR Croatia, SFR Yugoslavia
- Listed height: 1.92 m (6 ft 4 in)

Career information
- NBA draft: 1989: undrafted
- Playing career: 1984–2001
- Position: Point guard
- Number: 4, 14
- Coaching career: 2004–2005

Career history

Playing
- 1984–1987: Partizan
- 1987–1991: IMT Belgrade
- 1991–1993: Partizan
- 1993–1994: CSKA Sofia
- 1994–1996: Borovica Ruma
- 1996–1997: Rabotnički
- 1997–1998: Budućnost Podgorica
- 1998–1999: Oyak Renault
- 1999–2000: Hemofarm
- 2000–2001: BKK Radnički

Coaching
- 2004–2005: Hemofarm (assistant)

Career highlights
- As player: EuroLeague champion (1992); 2× Yugoslav League champion (1987, 1992); Yugoslav Cup winner (1992); FR Yugoslavia Cup winner (1998)

Vladimir Dragutinović (Serbian Cyrillic: Владимир Драгутиновић; born 20 June 1967) is a Serbian professional basketball administrator and former basketball player and coach.

== Post-playing career ==
Dragutinović had a stint with Hemofarm as an assistant coach.
