= Mirza Delibašić Cup =

Basketball tournament in Bosnia and Herzegovina

Mirza Delibašić Cup Kup Mirza Delibašić
- Sport: Basketball
- Founded: 1993; 33 years ago
- No. of teams: 4
- Country: Bosnia and Herzegovina
- Continent: (European Union) FIBA Europe (Europe)
- Most recent champions: Bosna (5th title)
- Most titles: Igokea (11 titles)
- Website: basket.ba

Mirza Delibašić Cup (Bosnian: Kup Mirza Delibašić), formerly Basketball Cup of Bosnia and Herzegovina (Bosnian: Kup Bosne i Herzegovine u košarci), is the men's national basketball cup of Bosnia and Herzegovina. It is run by the Basketball Federation of Bosnia and Herzegovina and is named after Bosnian basketball legend and FIBA Hall of Fame member Mirza Delibašić.

== History ==
There were three separated cup competitions, organized on ethnical principles. In 1998, joint final rounds were organized for the first time, and in 2001, clubs from Republika Srpska took part. Since the 2001–02 season, it is a regular cup competition.

In December 2018, the Basketball Federation of Bosnia and Herzegovina changed the name of the cup to the Mirza Delibašić Cup in honor of Mirza Delibašić.

== Title holders ==
- 1999–00 Borac Banja Luka (Borac Nektar)
- 2000–01 Sloboda Tuzla (Sloboda Dita)
- 2001–02 Široki (Feal Široki)
- 2002–03 Široki (Feal Široki)
- 2003–04 Široki (Široki Hercegtisak)
- 2004–05 Bosna (Bosna ASA)
- 2005–06 Široki (Široki HT Eronet)
- 2006–07 Igokea (Igokea Partizan)
- 2007–08 Široki (Široki HT Eronet)
- 2008–09 Bosna (Bosna ASA BH Telecom)
- 2009–10 Bosna (Bosna ASA BH Telecom)
- 2010–11 Široki (Široki TT Kabeli)
- 2011–12 Široki (Široki WWin)
- 2012–13 Igokea
- 2013–14 Široki (Široki Primorka)
- 2014–15 Igokea
- 2015–16 Igokea
- 2016–17 Igokea
- 2017–18 Igokea
- 2018–19 Igokea
- 2019–20 Spars (Spars Realway)
- 2020–21 Igokea
- 2021–22 Igokea (Igokea m:tel)
- 2022–23 Igokea (Igokea m:tel)
- 2023–24 Bosna (Bosna Meridianbet)
- 2024–25 Igokea (Igokea m:tel)
- 2025–26 Bosna (Bosna BH Telecom)

== Finals ==
Year	Final		
Year	Champion	Score	Runner-up
2000	Borac Nektar (Note: As of 2018, the club is known as SKK Borac 1947.)	—N/a	Široki
2001	Sloboda Dita	—N/a	Igokea
2002	Feal Široki	—N/a	Brotnjo
2003	Feal Široki	—N/a	Borac Nektar
2004	Široki Hercegtisak	73–65	Leotar
2005	Bosna ASA	85–84	Široki
2006	Široki HT Eronet	85–79	Bosna ASA
2007	Igokea Partizan	93–59	Slavija East Sarajevo
2008	Široki HT Eronet	74–72	Borac Nektar (Note: As of 2018, the club is known as KK Borac Banja Luka.)
2009	Bosna ASA BH Telecom	73–64	Široki Prima pivo
2010	Bosna ASA BH Telecom	84–68	Sloboda Tuzla
2011	Široki TT Kabeli	73–69	Bosna ASA BH Telecom
2012	Široki WWin	83–75	Igokea
2013	Igokea	86–81	Široki
2014	Široki Primorka	77–76	Igokea
2015	Igokea	73–58	Široki
2016	Igokea	95–77	Široki
2017	Igokea	79–67	Bosna
2018	Igokea	94–76	Kakanj
2019	Igokea	78–63	Spars
2020	Spars Realway	93–85	Igokea
2021	Igokea	77–55	Spars
2022	Igokea m:tel	93–66	Široki
2023	Igokea m:tel	76–49	Široki
2024	Bosna Meridianbet	83–73	Široki TT Kabeli
2025	Igokea m:tel	88–58	Bosna Visit Sarajevo
2026	Bosna BH Telecom	98–70	Borac WWin

=== Performance by club ===
Club	Titles	Years
Igokea	11	2007, 2013, 2015, 2016, 2017, 2018, 2019, 2021, 2022, 2023, 2025
Široki	8	2002, 2003, 2004, 2006, 2008, 2011, 2012, 2014
Bosna	5	2005, 2009, 2010, 2024, 2026
Borac Banja Luka	1	2000
Sloboda Tuzla	1	2001
Spars	1	2020

== Regional cup tournaments ==
Season	Winners		
Season	KSBiH (Note: This cup was organized by the Basketball Federation of Bosnia and Herzegovina, and it was recognized by FIBA.)	Herzeg-Bosnia	Republikia Srpska
1992–93	Not held	Not held	Borac Banja Luka
1993–94	Sloboda Tuzla	Not held	Borac Banja Luka
1994–95	Sloboda Tuzla	Vitez	Borac Banja Luka
1995–96	Sloboda Tuzla	Vitez	Borac Banja Luka
1996–97	Sloboda Tuzla	Brotnjo	Borac Banja Luka
1997–98	Sloboda Tuzla	Brotnjo	Borac Banja Luka
1998–99	Sloboda Tuzla	Široki	Borac Banja Luka
1999–00	Sloboda Tuzla	Brotnjo	Igokea
2000–01	Sloboda Tuzla	Brotnjo	Igokea
2001–02	Sloboda Tuzla	Široki	Borac Banja Luka

== See also ==
- Basketball Championship of Bosnia and Herzegovina
- Basketball Cup of Bosnia and Herzegovina (Women)
