= Triple Crown (European basketball) =

Achievement in club basketball in Europe

In European professional club basketball, the Triple Crown refers to a club winning their country's top-tier level national domestic league, their county's primary national domestic cup, and the top-tier level European-wide continental competition, which is the EuroLeague, all in the same season. It is the highest accomplishment that a European professional basketball club can achieve during a season. To date, 13 European basketball clubs have won the European Basketball Triple Crown, on a total of 23 occasions.

== All the European Basketball Triple Crowns achieved ==
Season	Club	National League	National Cup	European Cup
1964–65	(Spain) Real Madrid	Primera División	Generalísimo's Cup	FIBA European Champions Cup
1969–70	(Italy) Ignis Varese	Serie A	Italian Cup	FIBA European Champions Cup
1972–73	(Italy) Ignis Varese	Serie A	Italian Cup	FIBA European Champions Cup
1973–74	(Spain) Real Madrid	Primera División	Generalísimo's Cup	FIBA European Champions Cup
1976–77	(Israel) Maccabi Elite Tel Aviv	Israeli Premier League	Israeli State Cup	FIBA European Champions Cup
1980–81	(Israel) Maccabi Elite Tel Aviv	Israeli Premier League	Israeli State Cup	FIBA European Champions Cup
1984–85	(Socialist Federal Republic of Yugoslavia) Cibona	First Federal League	Yugoslav Cup	FIBA European Champions Cup
1986–87	(Italy) Tracer Milano	Serie A	Italian Cup	FIBA European Champions Cup
1989–90	(Socialist Federal Republic of Yugoslavia) Jugoplastika	First Federal League	Yugoslav Cup	FIBA European Champions Cup
1990–91	(Socialist Federal Republic of Yugoslavia) POP 84	First Federal League	Yugoslav Cup	FIBA European Champions Cup
1991–92	(Socialist Federal Republic of Yugoslavia) Partizan	First Federal League	Yugoslav Cup	FIBA European League
1996–97	(Greece) Olympiacos	GBL	Greek Cup	FIBA EuroLeague
2000–01	(Italy) Kinder Bologna	Serie A	Italian Cup	EuroLeague
2000–01	(Israel) Maccabi Elite Tel Aviv	Israeli Premier League	Israeli State Cup	FIBA SuproLeague
2002–03	(Spain) FC Barcelona	Liga ACB	King's Cup	EuroLeague
2003–04	(Israel) Maccabi Elite Tel Aviv	Israeli Premier League	Israeli State Cup	EuroLeague
2004–05	(Israel) Maccabi Elite Tel Aviv	Israeli Premier League	Israeli State Cup	EuroLeague
2005–06	(Russia) CSKA Moscow	Superleague A	Russian Cup	EuroLeague
2006–07	(Greece) Panathinaikos	GBL	Greek Cup	EuroLeague
2008–09	(Greece) Panathinaikos	GBL	Greek Cup	EuroLeague
2013–14	(Israel) Maccabi Electra Tel Aviv	Israeli Premier League	Israeli State Cup	EuroLeague
2014–15	(Spain) Real Madrid	Liga ACB	King's Cup	EuroLeague
2024–25	(Turkey) Fenerbahçe	Turkish Super League	Turkish Cup	EuroLeague

- In the 2000–01 season, there were two first-tier level European-wide champions: Maccabi Tel Aviv, that won FIBA's SuproLeague and Kinder Bologna, that won EuroLeague Basketball Company's EuroLeague.
- Šarūnas Jasikevičius is the only player in the history of European basketball to have won the European Triple Crown with his teams 4 times. The teams that won the Triple Crown in which Jasikevičius played are: FC Barcelona in 2002–03, Maccabi Elite Tel Aviv in 2003–04, and 2004–05, and Panathinaikos in 2008–09. Jasikevicius also won the Triple Crown with Fenerbahçe as a coach in the 2024–25 season, becoming the only person in history to achieve this title both as a player and as a coach.
- Željko Obradović is the only head coach to have won the European Triple Crown three times: in 1991–92 with Partizan, and in 2006–07 and 2008–09 with Panathinaikos.

== Achievements by club ==
Triple Crown	Club	Seasons
6	(Israel) Maccabi Tel Aviv	1976–77, 1980–81, 2000–01, 2003–04, 2004–05, 2013–14
3	(Spain) Real Madrid	1964–65, 1973–74, 2014–15
2	(Italy) Varese	1969–70, 1972–73
2	(Socialist Federal Republic of Yugoslavia) Split	1989–90, 1990–91
2	(Greece) Panathinaikos	2006–07, 2008–09
2	(Greece) Olympiacos	1996–97, 2025-26
1	(Socialist Federal Republic of Yugoslavia) Cibona	1984–85
1	(Italy) Olimpia Milano	1986–87
1	(Socialist Federal Republic of Yugoslavia) Partizan	1991–92
1	(Italy) Virtus Bologna	2000–01
1	(Spain) FC Barcelona	2002–03
1	(Russia) CSKA Moscow	2005–06
1	(Turkey) Fenerbahçe	2024–25

== Achievements by national league ==
Triple Crown	League	Seasons
6	(Israel) Israeli Premier League	1976–77, 1980–81, 2000–01, 2003–04, 2004–05, 2013–14
4	(Italy) Lega Serie A	1969–70, 1972–73, 1986–87, 2000–01
4	(Spain) Primera División & Liga ACB	1964–65, 1973–74, 2002–03, 2014–15
4	(Socialist Federal Republic of Yugoslavia) First Federal League	1984–85, 1989–90, 1990–91, 1991–92
4	(Greece) Greek Basketball League	1996–97, 2006–07, 2008–09, 2025–26
1	(Russia) Russian Super League A	2005–06
1	(Turkey) Turkish Super League	2024–25

== "Small European Basketball Triple Crown" ==
=== Second-tiers ===
In addition, five European professional basketball clubs have won their top-tier level national domestic league, their top-tier level national domestic cup, and one of the 2nd-tier level European-wide competitions (FIBA European Cup Winner's Cup / FIBA European Cup / EuroCup / FIBA Champions League) in the same season – the so-called, "Small European Triple Crown".

Season	Club	National League	National Cup	European Cup
1971–72	(Italy) Simmenthal Milano	Serie A	Italian Cup	FIBA European Cup Winner's Cup
1981–82	(Socialist Federal Republic of Yugoslavia) Cibona	First Federal League	Yugoslav Cup	FIBA European Cup Winner's Cup
1987–88	(France) Limoges CSP	LNB Pro A	Tournoi des As	FIBA European Cup Winner's Cup
1993–94	(Slovenia) Smelt Olimpija	Slovenian Premier A League	Slovenian Cup	FIBA European Cup
2008–09	(Lithuania) Lietuvos rytas	LKL	LKF Cup	EuroCup

=== Third and fourth-tiers ===
Seven pro European basketball clubs, on eight different occasions, have won their top-tier level national domestic league, their top-tier level national domestic cup, and one of the 3rd-tier level European-wide competitions (FIBA Korać Cup / FIBA EuroChallenge), or one of the 4th-tier level European-wide competitions (Original FIBA Europe Cup / Second FIBA Europe Cup), in the same season.

Season	Club	National League	National Cup	European Cup
1976–77	(Socialist Federal Republic of Yugoslavia) Jugoplastika	First Federal League	Yugoslav Cup	FIBA Korać Cup (3rd tier)
1978–79	(Socialist Federal Republic of Yugoslavia) Partizan	First Federal League	Yugoslav Cup	FIBA Korać Cup (3rd tier)
1982–83	(France) Limoges CSP	Nationale 1	Federation Cup	FIBA Korać Cup (3rd tier)
1986–87	(Spain) FC Barcelona	Liga ACB	King's Cup	FIBA Korać Cup (3rd tier)
1995–96	(Turkey) Efes Pilsen	BSL	Turkish Cup	FIBA Korać Cup (3rd tier)
1999–00	(France) Limoges CSP	LNB Pro A	French Cup	FIBA Korać Cup (3rd tier)
2004–05	(Romania) Asesoft Ploiesti	Divizia A	Romanian Cup	FIBA Europe Cup (4th tier)
2011–12	(Turkey) Beşiktaş Milangaz	BSL	Turkish Cup	FIBA EuroChallenge (3rd tier)
