= Borislav Džaković =

Serbian basketball player and coach (1947–2019)

Personal information
- Born: 24 October 1947 Mostar, PR Bosnia and Herzegovina, FPR Yugoslavia
- Died: 28 June 2019 (aged 71) Belgrade, Serbia

Career information
- Playing career: 1963–1967
- Coaching career: 1973–2010

Career history

Playing
- 1963–1967: Lokomotiva Mostar

Coaching
- 1973–1982: 22. decembar
- 1982–1984: Partizan
- 1984–1987: Sloboda Tuzla
- 1987–1989: Šibenka
- 1989: Borac Banja Luka
- 1990–1992: Sloboda Tuzla
- 1992: Vojvodina
- 1993–1994: ENAD Ayiou Dometiou
- 1994–1995: Partizan
- 1995–1996: Crvena zvezda
- 1997–1998: Crvena zvezda (assistant)
- 1998: Crvena zvezda
- 2003–2006: Sloboda Tuzla
- 2009–2010: Borac Banja Luka

Borislav "Bora" Džaković (Serbian Cyrillic: Борислав Џаковић, 24 October 1947 – 28 June 2019) was a Serbian-Bosnian professional basketball coach and player.

== Coaching career ==
The greatest success of Džaković was the double crown with Partizan in the 1994–95 season. Džaković managed with Sloboda Tuzla to get into the Yugoslav First Basketball League for the 1986–87 season and the 1991–92 season. He also led the Šibenka, Borac Banja Luka and Crvena zvezda.

The only foreign engagement was in Cyprus Division A, where he coached ENAD Ayiou Dometiou, based in Nicosia.

== National team coaching career ==
Džaković was a head coach of the Yugoslavia national team that won a silver medal at the 1986 Balkan Championship.

== Career achievements ==
- YUBA League champion: 1 (with Partizan: 1994–95)
- FR Yugoslav Cup winner: 1 (with Partizan: 1994–95)

== Personal life ==
Džaković died on 28 June 2019 in Belgrade, Serbia, after a battle with a disease.

== See also ==
- List of KK Crvena zvezda head coaches
- List of KK Partizan head coaches
