= Miloš Bojović (born 1938) =

Serbian basketball person

- Милош Бојовић
- Born: 25 June 1938; Priština, Yugoslavia
- Died: 5 August 2001 (aged 63); Belgrade, Serbia, Yugoslavia
- Other names: Miško; Miško Boem
- Education: University of Belgrade
- Occupations: Basketball player, coach and executive; journalist; lawyer; politician
- Basketball career

Career information
- NBA draft: 1960: undrafted
- Playing career: 1957–1969
- Number: 4, 12, 5

Career history
- 1957–1969: Partizan
- 1963–1964: → OKK Beograd
Medals
Men's basketball
Representing Yugoslavia
EuroBasket
Silver medal – second place	1965 Soviet Union	Team
Bronze medal – third place	1963 Poland	Team

Miloš Bojović (Serbian Cyrillic: Милош Бојовић; 25 June 1938 – 5 August 2001) was a Serbian lawyer, sports journalist, professional basketball player, coach and executive, as well as a politician. He represented the Yugoslavia national basketball team internationally.

== Basketball career ==
=== Playing career ===
Bojović spent his entire playing career with Belgrade-based club Partizan. Over 13 seasons, from the 1957 to 1968–69 season, he played 202 games and scored 4,086 points.

Bojović was loaned to OKK Beograd for the 1963–64 FIBA European Champions Cup season. Over three games, he averaged 7,3 points per game.

=== National team career ===
Bojović was a member of the Yugoslavia national team that won the bronze medal at the 1963 FIBA European Championship in Wrocław, Poland. Over six tournament games, he averaged seven points per game. He was member of the national team that won the silver medal at the 1965 FIBA European Championship in the Soviet Union. Over six tournament games, he averaged six points per game.

=== Post-playing career ===
Bojović was a head coach of the Partizan junior team from 1969 to 1972. After that, he was a staff member of Partizan. During the late 1980s, Bojović was president of the Belgrade Basketball Association.

== Journalism ==
Bojović also worked as a sports journalist who wrote about basketball. In 1963, he started to work for Politika, and then in the newly established Politika Ekspres. During the 1970s, he followed and wrote about the national basketball team.

== Legal career ==
Bojović earned his law degree from the University of Belgrade Faculty of Law. In 1986, he opened his law firm together with his wife Vesna. From 1995 to 2003, Bojović was a State's attorney for FR Yugoslavia.

== Political career ==
During the early 1990s, Bojović was a member of National Assembly of Serbia. He got elected at the 1990 Serbian general election. Later, he was elected to Federal Parlement of FR Yugoslavia.

== See also ==
- List of members of the National Assembly of Serbia, 1990–92
- KK Partizan accomplishments and records
