= Dragan Aleksić (basketball) =

Serbian basketball player & coach (born 1970)

Dragan Aleksić Драган Алексић
Pécsi VSK-Veolia
- Title: Head coach
- League: Hungarian League

Personal information
- Born: 1 May 1970 (age 56) Podujevo, AP Kosovo, SFR Yugoslavia
- Listed height: 1.95 m (6 ft 5 in)

Career information
- NBA draft: 1992: undrafted
- Playing career: 1989–2010
- Position: Shooting guard
- Number: 5, 8, 13, 10
- Coaching career: 2012–present

Career history

Playing
- 1989–1990: Crvena zvezda
- 1991–1998: Spartak
- 1998–1999: Radnički Belgrade
- 1999–2000: Haifa
- 2000: Slovakofarma Pezinok
- 2000–2001: Lokomotiv Mineralnye Vody
- 2001–2002: Sloboda Dita
- 2002–2003: Borac Banja Luka
- 2003–2004: Atlas
- 2004: Bosna ASA
- 2004–2005: Szolnoki Olaj
- 2005–2009: PVSK-Veolia
- 2009–2010: Szolnoki Olaj

Coaching
- 2012–2014: Szolnoki Olaj (assistant)
- 2014–2015: Szolnoki Olaj
- 2017: Soproni
- 2017–2019: Szolnoki Olajbányász
- 2020–present: PVSK-Veolia

Dragan Aleksić (Serbian Cyrillic: Драган Алексић; born 1 May 1970), also credited as Dragan Alekszics in Hungary, is a Serbian professional basketball coach and former player. He currently serves as the head coach for PVSK-Veolia of the Hungarian League.

== Playing career ==
Aleksić started his professional career in Belgrade-based team Crvena zvezda. In 1991, he joined Spartak Subotica. In 1998, he joined Radnički Belgrade for the 1998–99 season. Aleksić played the 1999–2000 season in Israel, for Haifa. After the season in Israel, Aleksić had stints in Slovakia (Slovakofarma Pezinok) and Russia (Lokomotiv Mineralnye Vody).

In 2001, Aleksić joined Tuzla-based Sloboda Dita of the ABA League and the Bosnia and Herzegovina Championship. On December 12, 2001, he set his ABA League career-high in points when he scored 41 points in a 92–86 road win over Zadar. He also recorded 7 rebounds, 7 assists, and 7 steals. He shot 7/17 from two, 5/8 from three, shooting at 48.0% from the field. He also shot 12/17 from the free-throw line. On February 2, 2002, Aleksić set his ABA League career-high in assists when he dished 14 assists in a 90-79 home win over Kvarner Novi Resort. He also recorded 13 points, 3 rebounds, and 2 steals.

After one season in Tuzla, Aleksić had more stints in Bosnia (Banjalučka pivara and Bosna ASA) and Serbia & Montenegro (Atlas). In November 2004, he signed for Szolnoki Olaj of the Hungarian League. He left Szolnoki after the end of the season.

== Coaching career ==
In January 2017, Aleksić was named a head coach of the Hungarian team Soproni.

On 14 July 2017, Aleksić signed for Szolnoki Olaj.

== Administrative career ==
In 2016, Aleksić became the technical director for SCM U Craiova of the Romanian League. In January 2017, he parted ways with SCM U Craiova.

== Career achievements and awards ==
As player

- Hungarian Cup winner: 1 (with PVSK-Veolia: 2008–09)

As coach

- Hungarian League champion: 3 (with Szolnoki Olaj: 2013–14, 2014–15, 2017–18)
- Hungarian Cup winner: 4 (with Szolnoki Olaj: 2013–14, 2014–15, 2017–18, 2018–19)
