= ATSE Graz (basketball) =

Austrian basketball team

- Founded: 1947; 79 years ago
- Location: Graz, Austria
- Team colors: Red and White
Home	Away

ATSE Graz is a basketball club from the city of Graz, Austria. The club is part of the multisport club ATSE Graz ( Arbeiter- Turn- und Sportverein Eggenberg / "Workers' gymnastic and sporting club Eggenberg").

== History ==
The club under the name Progress Graz (for sponsorship reasons), demoted in 1975 in the Österreichische Basketball Bundesliga. After two seasons Progress came out in European competitions and participated in FIBA Korać Cup (1977–78 & 1978–79) without achieve special performance. The 1981–82 season with new name and sponsor (Merkur) the team ranked third in the domestic league and got right to participate in the Korać Cup of the next year. The same has managed and the 1983–1984 season.
