= 1945 Yugoslav First Basketball League =

Top-tier competition

Yugoslav First Basketball League
- Season: 1945
- Games played: 4
- Teams: 5

Finals
- Champions: Yugoslav Army (1st title)
- Runners-up: PR Serbia
- Semifinalists: PR Croatia

Records
- Highest scoring: PR Croatia 24–41 Yugoslav Army
- Winning streak: 2 games Yugoslav Army
- All statistics correct as of 24 April 2017.

The 1945 Yugoslav First Basketball League season was the inaugural season of the Yugoslav First Basketball League, the top-tier level basketball competition in Yugoslavia. The league launched with 5 teams playing a single-elimination tournament held in Subotica, PR Serbia. Teams participating in the season were selections of three Yugoslav constituent republics (PR Croatia, PR Macedonia, and PR Serbia), one autonomous province (AP Vojvodina), as well as the Yugoslav People's Army selection. The tournament concluded with the Yugoslav Army team defeating the Serbia team, 21–18, in the Final.

== Bracket ==
Quarterfinals
(Socialist Republic of Croatia) PR Croatia	29
(Socialist Republic of Macedonia) PR Macedonia	27
(Socialist Republic of Serbia) PR Serbia	20
(Socialist Republic of Serbia) AP Vojvodina	18

Semifinals
(Socialist Republic of Croatia) PR Croatia	24
(Socialist Federal Republic of Yugoslavia) Yugoslav Army	41
(Socialist Republic of Serbia) PR Serbia	w/o

Final
(Socialist Federal Republic of Yugoslavia) Yugoslav Army	21
(Socialist Republic of Serbia) PR Serbia	18

== Rosters ==
The following is a list of players and coached who played in the 1945 season.

Team	Players	Head coach	Ref.
(Socialist Federal Republic of Yugoslavia) Yugoslav Army	Strahinja Alagić, Luciano Dekleva, Pavle Kostić, Zlatko Kovačević, Mirko Marjanović, Božidar Munćan, Aleksandar Nikolić, Atilio Pikoli, Ratko Tijanić, Ratko Vlahović	Ratko Vlahović	
(Socialist Republic of Serbia) PR Serbia	Radomir Šaper, Svetislav Šaper, Nebojša Popović, Vasilije Stojković, Ivan Dimić, Miodrag Stefanović, Mile Nikolić		
(Socialist Republic of Croatia) PR Croatia			
(Socialist Republic of Macedonia) PR Macedonia			
(Socialist Republic of Serbia) AP Vojvodina			

== See also ==
- 1945 Yugoslav Women's Basketball League
