= 1977–78 FIBA Korać Cup =

- League: FIBA Korać Cup
- Sport: Basketball

Final
- Champions: (Socialist Federal Republic of Yugoslavia) Partizan
- Runners-up: (Socialist Federal Republic of Yugoslavia) Bosna

FIBA Korać Cup seasons
- ← 1976–77 1978–79 →

The 1977–78 FIBA Korać Cup was the seventh edition of FIBA's new competition, running from 15 November 1977 to 21 April 1978. It was contested by 32 teams, five more than in the previous edition.

Partizan defeated Bosna in a Yugoslav civil final to become the competition's champion for first time. This title was the third consecutive in a row for a Yugoslav team.

== Season teams ==
Country	Teams	Clubs (ranking in 1976–77 national league)			
France	4	Berck	Moderne	Nice	Orthez
Greece	4	Panellinios	AEK	Panionios	Aris
Italy	4	Cinzano Milano	Xerox Milano	Emerson Genova	Scavolini Pesaro
Spain	4	Caja Rural Canarias	Juventud Freixenet	Centro Natación Helios	Askatuak
(Socialist Federal Republic of Yugoslavia) Yugoslavia	4	Bosna	Partizan	Cibona	Beko Beograd
West Germany	3	1.FC Bamberg	SSV Hagen	Wolfenbüttel	
Austria	2	Progress Graz	Maximarkt Wels		
Israel	2	Hapoel Ramat Gan	Hapoel Gvat/Yagur		
Turkey	2	İTÜ	Şeker		
Belgium	1	Anderlecht			
Czechoslovakia	1	Inter Slovnaft			
Poland	1	Resovia Rzeszów			

== First round ==
Team 1	Agg.	Team 2	1st leg	2nd leg
SSV Hagen (West Germany)	198–159	(Spain) Caja Rural Canarias	88–67	110–92
Xerox Milano (Italy)	213–138	(Austria) Maximarkt Wels	121–68	93–70
Nice (France)	160–150	(Israel) Hapoel Gvat/Yagur	88–84	72–66
Orthez (France)	151–192	(Spain) Juventud Freixenet	72–76	79–116
Anderlecht (Belgium)	185–190	(Socialist Federal Republic of Yugoslavia) Partizan	98–80	87–110
Şeker (Turkey)	163–176	(Czechoslovakia) Inter Slovnaft	86–70	77–106
Centro Natación Helios (Spain)	178–245	(Italy) Cinzano Milano	102–105	76–140
Berck (France)	162–157	(Spain) Askatuak	88–87	74–70
Beko Beograd (Socialist Federal Republic of Yugoslavia)	195–148	(Austria) Progress Graz	115–67	80–81
Hapoel Ramat Gan (Israel)	188–192	(Socialist Federal Republic of Yugoslavia) Cibona	85–83	103–109
Panellinios (Greece)	124–159	(Italy) Scavolini Pesaro	77–67	47–92
Emerson Genova (Italy)	157–146	(West Germany) Wolfenbüttel	83–72	74–74
Moderne (France)	180–117	(Greece) Aris	98–46	82–71
AEK (Greece)	152–139	(West Germany) 1.FC Bamberg	68–62	84–77
Resovia Rzeszów (Poland)	177–165	(Greece) Panionios	93–63	84–102
Bosna (Socialist Federal Republic of Yugoslavia)	4–0*	(Turkey) İTÜ	2–0	2–0

*İTÜ withdrew before the first leg, and Bosna received a forfeit (2–0) in both games.

== Round of 16 ==
Key to colors
Top place in each group advance to semifinals

=== Group A ===
	Team	Pld	Pts	W	L	PF	PA	PD
1.	(Socialist Federal Republic of Yugoslavia) Partizan	6	10	4	2	573	521	+52
2.	(France) Nice	6	10	4	2	526	503	+23
3.	(Italy) Emerson Genova	6	9	3	3	507	507	0
4.	(Greece) AEK	6	7	1	5	451	526	−75

=== Group B ===
	Team	Pld	Pts	W	L	PF	PA	PD
1.	(Socialist Federal Republic of Yugoslavia) Bosna	6	10	4	2	619	572	+47
2.	(France) Berck	6	10	4	2	580	566	+14
3.	(Italy) Scavolini Pesaro	6	9	3	3	557	590	−33
4.	(Czechoslovakia) Inter Slovnaft	6	7	1	5	558	586	−28

=== Group C ===
	Team	Pld	Pts	W	L	PF	PA	PD
1.	(Spain) Juventud Freixenet	6	12	6	0	555	472	+83
2.	(Socialist Federal Republic of Yugoslavia) Beko Beograd	6	9	3	3	522	541	−19
3.	(Italy) Xerox Milano	6	8	2	4	557	547	+10
4.	(West Germany) SSV Hagen	6	7	1	5	530	604	−74

=== Group D ===
	Team	Pld	Pts	W	L	PF	PA	PD
1.	(Italy) Cinzano Milano	6	10	4	2	546	494	+53
2.	(France) Moderne	6	10	4	2	555	505	+50
3.	(Socialist Federal Republic of Yugoslavia) Cibona	6	10	4	2	537	520	+17
4.	(Poland) Resovia Rzeszów	6	6	0	6	435	554	−119

== Semi finals ==
Team 1	Agg.	Team 2	1st leg	2nd leg
Juventud Freixenet (Spain)	209–216	(Socialist Federal Republic of Yugoslavia) Partizan	114–109	95–107
Cinzano Milano (Italy)	160–177	(Socialist Federal Republic of Yugoslavia) Bosna	79–76	81–101

== Final ==
21 March 1978, Sportska dvorana Borik, Banja Luka

Team 1	Score	Team 2
Partizan (Socialist Federal Republic of Yugoslavia)	117–110	(Socialist Federal Republic of Yugoslavia) Bosna

1977–78 FIBA Korać Cup Champions

Partizan
1st title
