= 1978–79 FIBA Korać Cup =

- League: FIBA Korać Cup
- Sport: Basketball

Final
- Champions: (Socialist Federal Republic of Yugoslavia) Partizan
- Runners-up: (Italy) Arrigoni Rieti

FIBA Korać Cup seasons
- ← 1977–78 1979–80 →

The 1978–79 FIBA Korać Cup was the eighth edition of FIBA's Korać Cup basketball competition. The Yugoslav Partizan defeated the Italian Arrigoni Rieti in the final on March 20, 1979 in Belgrade, Serbia. This was Partizan's second consecutive win and the fourth consecutive win for a Yugoslav team.

== First round ==
Team 1	Agg.	Team 2	1st leg	2nd leg
Lignon (Switzerland)	160–138	(Austria) Progress Graz	77–73	83–65
Murray Edinburgh (Scotland)	154–156	(England) Stockport Belgrade	70–73	84–83
T71 Dudelange (Luxembourg)	127–181	(France) ESM Challans	53–85	74–96
Panionios (Greece)	185–191	(Switzerland) Pully	93–75	92–116
Sunderland Sunblest (England)	188–205	(Spain) Areslux Granollers	86–92	102–113
Milde Sorte Wien (Austria)	186–150	(Greece) Maroussi	114–77	72–73
Ginásio Figueirense (Portugal)	149–189	(France) Orthez	71–90	78–99
Panellinios (Greece)	112–134	(Belgium) Verviers-Pepinster	58–53	54–81
Wolfenbüttel (West Germany)	157–147	(Turkey) Karşıyaka	77–68	80–79

== Second round ==
Team 1	Agg.	Team 2	1st leg	2nd leg
Lignon (Switzerland)	147–167	(Belgium) Éveil Monceau	79–83	68–84
Vevey (Switzerland)	160–228	(Socialist Federal Republic of Yugoslavia) Jugoplastika	79–106	81–122
Stockport Belgrade (England)	149–219	(Socialist Federal Republic of Yugoslavia) Cibona	76–104	73–115
ESM Challans (France)	178–225	(Spain) Cotonificio	92–100	86–125
Iskra Olimpija (Socialist Federal Republic of Yugoslavia)	242–180	(Switzerland) Pully	117–74	125–106
Caen (France)	203–180	(Spain) Areslux Granollers	116–82	87–78
Milde Sorte Wien (Austria)	164–173	(Israel) Hapoel Gvat/Yagur	82–86	82–87
Orthez (France)	169–161	(Greece) Panathinaikos	102–73	67–88
Verviers-Pepinster (Belgium)	192–201	(Italy) Pagnossin Gorizia	92–85	100–116
Slavia VŠ Praha (Czechoslovakia)	166–142	(West Germany) Wolfenbüttel	86–82	80–60
Askatuak (Spain)	158–192	(France) Olympique Antibes	79–74	79–118
Standard Liège (Belgium)	182–143	(Spain) Pineda	103–70	79–73
Hapoel Haifa (Israel)	156–154	(Belgium) Maes Pils	93–70	63–84
ŁKS Łódź (Poland)	160–196	(Czechoslovakia) Inter Slovnaft	83–98	77–98

Automatically qualified to round of 16

- (Socialist Federal Republic of Yugoslavia) Partizan (title holder)
- (Italy) Arrigoni Rieti

== Round of 16 ==
Key to colors
Top place in each group advance to semifinals

=== Group A ===
	Team	Pld	Pts	W	L	PF	PA	PD
1.	(Italy) Arrigoni Rieti	6	11	5	1	514	451	+63
2.	(Czechoslovakia) Inter Slovnaft	6	9	3	3	475	474	+1
3.	(Socialist Federal Republic of Yugoslavia) Cibona	6	9	3	3	466	453	+13
4.	(France) Orthez	6	7	1	5	453	530	−77

=== Group B ===
	Team	Pld	Pts	W	L	PF	PA	PD
1.	(Socialist Federal Republic of Yugoslavia) Partizan	6	12	6	0	598	537	+61
2.	(Italy) Pagnossin Gorizia	6	9	3	3	574	590	−16
3.	(Israel) Hapoel Haifa	6	8	2	4	537	560	−23
4.	(France) Olympique Antibes	6	7	1	5	501	523	−22

=== Group C ===
	Team	Pld	Pts	W	L	PF	PA	PD
1.	(Socialist Federal Republic of Yugoslavia) Jugoplastika	6	11	5	1	546	473	+53
2.	(France) Caen	6	10	4	2	501	463	+38
3.	(Czechoslovakia) Slavia VŠ Praha	6	8	2	4	462	514	−52
4.	(Belgium) Éveil Monceau	6	7	1	5	488	547	−59

=== Group D ===
	Team	Pld	Pts	W	L	PF	PA	PD
1.	(Spain) Cotonificio	6	10	4	2	544	538	+6
2.	(Belgium) Standard Liège	6	10	4	2	534	498	+36
3.	(Socialist Federal Republic of Yugoslavia) Iskra Olimpija	6	9	3	3	556	534	+22
4.	(Israel) Hapoel Gvat/Yagur	6	7	1	5	454	518	−64

== Semi finals ==
Team 1	Agg.	Team 2	1st leg	2nd leg
Cotonificio (Spain)	171–182	(Italy) Arrigoni Rieti	108–95	63–87
Jugoplastika (Socialist Federal Republic of Yugoslavia)	192–195	(Socialist Federal Republic of Yugoslavia) Partizan	96–97	96–98

== Final ==
March 20, Hala Pionir, Belgrade

Team 1	Score	Team 2
Partizan (Socialist Federal Republic of Yugoslavia)	108–98	(Italy) Arrigoni Rieti

1978–79 FIBA Korać Cup Champions

Partizan
2nd title
