= 1991–92 KK Partizan season =

Basketball season

Partizan
1991–92 season
- President: Radojica Nikčević
- Head coach: Željko Obradović
- Yugoslav League: Champion
- Yugoslav Cup: Champion
- European League: Champion

The 1991–92 season was the most successful season in the history of KK Partizan. Partizan took the title of European champion and also won the Yugoslav League and the Yugoslav Cup.

== Players ==
=== Roster ===
No.	Name	Position
4	Aleksandar Đorđević	PG
5	Predrag Danilović	SG
6	Nikola Lončar	SG
7	Igor Mihajlovski	PF
8	Zoran Stevanović	C
9	Igor Perović	SG
10	Dragiša Šarić	SF
11	Željko Rebrača	C
12	Mlađan Šilobad	C
13	Slaviša Koprivica	PF / C
14	Vladimir Dragutinović	PG
15	Ivo Nakić	SF
Head coach: Željko Obradović

== YUBA League ==
=== Standings ===
Pos	Team	Pld	W	L	PF	PA	PD	Pts	Qualification or relegation
1	Partizan Inex	22	20	2	2040	1569	+471	42	Advance to the playoffs
2	Crvena zvezda	22	15	7	1838	1759	+79	37	Advance to the playoffs
3	Rabotnički Godel	22	14	8	1814	1644	+170	36	Advance to the playoffs
4	Sloboda Dita	22	13	9	1831	1727	+104	35	Advance to the playoffs
5	Bosna	22	13	9	1909	1887	+22	35	

Source: kosarka.co.yu

26 October 1991 1	Prvi partizan (Socialist Republic of Serbia)	71–90	(Socialist Republic of Serbia) Partizan	Titovo Užice
	Pts: Pavlović 19		Pts: Nakić 18	Arena: Veliki Park Hall; Attendance: 1,500

2 November 1991 2	Partizan (Socialist Republic of Serbia)	87–67	(Socialist Republic of Serbia) Crvena zvezda	Belgrade
	Pts: Danilović 20		Pts: Ilić 22	Arena: Pionir Hall; Attendance: 5,500

9 November 1991 3	Infos RTM (Socialist Republic of Serbia)	83–106	(Socialist Republic of Serbia) Partizan	Belgrade
	Pts: Lakićević 27		Pts: Danilović 21

16 November 1991 4	Partizan (Socialist Republic of Serbia)	103–60	(Socialist Republic of Serbia) Spartak Subotica	Belgrade
	Pts: Nakić 21		Pts: Ivković 19	Arena: Pionir Hall; Attendance: 1,700

23 November 1991 5	Budućnost (Socialist Republic of Montenegro)	57–82	(Socialist Republic of Serbia) Partizan	Titograd
	Pts: Ivanović 15		Pts: Danilović 23	Arena: Morača; Attendance: 1,500

30 November 1991 6	Partizan (Socialist Republic of Serbia)	96–79	(Socialist Republic of Serbia) Sloga	Belgrade
	Pts: Lončar 22		Pts: Goljović 18

7 December 1991 7	Bosna (Socialist Republic of Bosnia and Herzegovina)	95–94	(Socialist Republic of Serbia) Partizan	Sarajevo
	Pts: Primorac 27		Pts: Đorđević 26	Arena: Skenderija; Attendance: 800

14 December 1991 8	Sloboda Tuzla (Socialist Republic of Bosnia and Herzegovina)	70–97	(Socialist Republic of Serbia) Partizan	Tuzla
	Pts: Lisica 23		Pts: Nakić 20	Arena: Mejdan Hall; Attendance: 3,500

21 December 1991 9	Partizan (Socialist Republic of Serbia)	93–80	(Socialist Republic of Serbia) Radnički	Belgrade
	Pts: Danilović 30		Pts: Vučurović 19	Arena: Pionir Hall; Attendance: 1,000

28 December 1991 10	Vojvodina (Socialist Republic of Serbia)	79–80	(Socialist Republic of Serbia) Partizan	Novi Sad
	Pts: Pavlović 22		Pts: Đorđević 23	Arena: SPC Vojvodina; Attendance: 6,000

4 January 1992 11	Partizan (Socialist Republic of Serbia)	109–110(OT)	(Socialist Republic of Macedonia) Rabotnički	Belgrade
	Pts: Danilović 32		Pts: Davitkov 24

12 January 1992 12	Partizan (Socialist Republic of Serbia)	93–73	(Socialist Republic of Serbia) Užice	Belgrade
	Pts: Danilović 21		Pts: Arnautović 27	Arena: Pionir Hall; Attendance: 1,000

19 January 1992 13	Crvena zvezda (Socialist Republic of Serbia)	50–72	(Socialist Republic of Serbia) Partizan	Belgrade
	Pts: Janković 14		Pts: Danilović 20	Arena: Pionir Hall; Attendance: 5,500

26 January 1992 14	Partizan (Socialist Republic of Serbia)	99–67	(Socialist Republic of Serbia) Infos RTM	Belgrade
	Pts: Lončar 19		Pts: Popović 22	Arena: Pionir Hall; Attendance: 700

2 February 1992 15	Spartak Subotica (Socialist Republic of Serbia)	81–86(OT)	(Socialist Republic of Serbia) Partizan	Subotica
	Pts: Jaramazović 27		Pts: Danilović 29	Arena: SC Dudova Šuma; Attendance: 4,500

16 February 1992 16	Sloga (Socialist Republic of Serbia)	73–83	(Socialist Republic of Serbia) Partizan	Kraljevo
	Pts: Medanović 17		Pts: Danilović 29	Attendance: 3,000

23 February 1992 17	Partizan (Socialist Republic of Serbia)	114–81	(Socialist Republic of Bosnia and Herzegovina) Bosna	Belgrade
	Pts: Danilović 26		Pts: Avdić 21

1 March 1992 18	Partizan (Socialist Republic of Serbia)	88–86	(Socialist Republic of Bosnia and Herzegovina) Sloboda Tuzla	Belgrade
	Pts: Danilović 18		Pts: Stojković 29	Arena: Pionir Hall; Attendance: 800

3 March 1992 19	Partizan (Socialist Republic of Serbia)	102–63	(Socialist Republic of Montenegro) Budućnost	Belgrade
	Pts: Danilović 20		Pts: Radović 18	Arena: Pionir Hall; Attendance: 200

21 March 1992 20	Partizan (Socialist Republic of Serbia)	99–68	(Socialist Republic of Serbia) Vojvodina	Belgrade
	Pts: Rebrača 17		Pts: Milićević 22	Arena: Pionir Hall; Attendance: 1,000

24 March 1992 21	Radnički (Socialist Republic of Serbia)	82–95	(Socialist Republic of Serbia) Partizan	Belgrade
	Pts: Vučurović 29		Pts: Danilović 20	Arena: CCS Šumice; Attendance: 800

28 March 1992 22	Rabotnički (Socialist Republic of Macedonia)	62–72	(Socialist Republic of Serbia) Partizan	Skopje
	Pts: Naumovski, Ivanović 17		Pts: Đorđević 20	Attendance: 2,500

=== Semi-finals ===
23 April 1992 SF 1	Partizan (Socialist Republic of Serbia)	87–67 (Series: 1–0)	(Socialist Republic of Bosnia and Herzegovina) Sloboda Tuzla	Belgrade
	Pts: Danilović 27		Pts: Lisica 13	Arena: Pionir Hall; Attendance: 2,000

25 April 1992 SF 2	Partizan (Socialist Republic of Serbia)	87–63 (Series: 2–0)	(Socialist Republic of Bosnia and Herzegovina) Sloboda Tuzla	Belgrade
	Pts: Nakić, Rebrača 19		Pts: Jovanović 15	Arena: Pionir Hall; Attendance: 1,000

=== Final ===
28 April 1992 F 1	Partizan (Federal Republic of Yugoslavia)	104–81 (Series: 1–0)	(Federal Republic of Yugoslavia) Crvena zvezda	Belgrade
	Pts: Đorđević 24		Pts: Ilić 28	Arena: Pionir Hall; Attendance: 5,000

30 April 1992 F 2	Partizan (Federal Republic of Yugoslavia)	92–81 (Series: 2–0)	(Federal Republic of Yugoslavia) Crvena zvezda	Belgrade
	Pts: Đorđević 25		Pts: Janković 27	Arena: Pionir Hall; Attendance: 3,500

2 May 1992 F 3	Crvena zvezda (Federal Republic of Yugoslavia)	75–92 (Series: 0–3)	(Federal Republic of Yugoslavia) Partizan	Belgrade
	Pts: Obradović 26		Pts: Danilović 23	Arena: Pionir Hall; Attendance: 4,000

== Yugoslav Cup ==
19 September 1991 Round of 32	Zorka (Socialist Republic of Serbia)	80–89	(Socialist Republic of Serbia) Partizan	Šabac
	Pts: Marković 20		Pts: Danilović 26	Arena: Zorka Hall; Attendance: 600

5 March 1992 Round of 16	Partizan (Socialist Republic of Serbia)	98–68	(Socialist Republic of Montenegro) Budućnost	Priština
	Pts: Danilović, Dragutinović 18		Pts: Milatović 20	Arena: Boro and Ramiz Hall; Attendance: 1,800

6 March 1992 Quarter-final	Partizan (Socialist Republic of Serbia)	110–86	(Socialist Republic of Serbia) Radnički	Priština
	Pts: Danilović 24		Pts: Jovanović 22	Arena: Boro and Ramiz Hall; Attendance: 2,000

2 April 1992 Semi-final	Partizan (Socialist Republic of Serbia)	91–78	(Socialist Republic of Macedonia) Rabotnički	Niš
	Pts: Danilović 24		Pts: Ivanović 30	Arena: Čair Hall; Attendance: 4,000

4 April 1992 Final	Partizan (Socialist Republic of Serbia)	105–79	(Socialist Republic of Bosnia and Herzegovina) Bosna	Niš
	Pts: Danilović 26		Pts: Bukva 16	Arena: Čair Hall; Attendance: 6,500

== European League ==
=== Second round ===
1 October 1991	Szolnoki Olajbányász (Hungary)	65–92	(Socialist Federal Republic of Yugoslavia) Partizan	Szolnok
	Scoring by quarter: 36–54, 29–38
	Pts: Berkics 20	Report	Pts: Danilović 25	Arena: Tiszaligeti Sportcsarnok; Attendance: 3,000

3 October 1991	Partizan (Socialist Federal Republic of Yugoslavia)	89–72	(Hungary) Szolnoki Olajbányász	Szolnok
	Scoring by quarter: 45–32, 44–40
	Pts: Nakić 19	Report	Pts: Hosszú 21	Arena: Tiszaligeti Sportcsarnok; Attendance: 2,000

=== Regular season ===
==== Group B ====
	Team	Pld	Pts	W	L	PF	PA	PD
1.	(Spain) Montigalà Joventut	14	25	11	3	1276	1114	+162
2.	(Spain) Estudiantes Caja Postal	14	24	10	4	1145	1096	+49
3.	(Italy) Philips Milano	14	24	10	4	1264	1161	+103
4.	(Socialist Federal Republic of Yugoslavia) Partizan^{*}	14	23	9	5	1178	1077	+101
5.	(Germany) Bayer 04 Leverkusen	14	21	7	7	1217	1154	+63
6.	(Belgium) Maes Pils	14	18	4	10	1112	1230	-118
7.	(Greece) Aris	14	17	3	11	1139	1359	-220
8.	(Netherlands) Commodore Den Helder	14	16	2	12	1050	1190	-140

- ^{*} Due to ongoing Yugoslav Wars, the three former Yugoslavian teams were forced to play all their home games outside their countries. All of them chose cities in Spain as the substitute home courts: eventual winner Partizan played in Fuenlabrada, title holder Slobodna Dalmacija in A Coruña and Cibona in Puerto Real.

31 October 1991	Commodore (Netherlands)	75–81	(Socialist Federal Republic of Yugoslavia) Partizan	Den Helder
	Scoring by quarter: 36–34, 39–47
		Report		Arena: Kingsdome; Attendance: 1,500

7 November 1991	Partizan (Socialist Federal Republic of Yugoslavia)	87–67	(Belgium) Maes Pils	Fuenlabrada
		Report		Arena: Polideportivo Fernando Martín

28 November 1991	Partizan (Socialist Federal Republic of Yugoslavia)	86–70	(Italy) Philips Milano	Fuenlabrada
	Scoring by quarter: 52–34, 34–36
		Report		Arena: Polideportivo Fernando Martín; Attendance: 3,000

5 December 1991	Montigalà Joventut (Spain)	79–76	(Socialist Federal Republic of Yugoslavia) Partizan	Badalona
	Scoring by quarter: 37–26, 42–50
		Report		Arena: Palau Municipal d'Esports de Badalona; Attendance: 10,000

12 December 1991	Bayer 04 Leverkusen (Germany)	80–73	(Socialist Federal Republic of Yugoslavia) Partizan	Leverkusen
	Scoring by quarter: 41–31, 39–42
		Report		Arena: Wilhelm Dopatka Halle; Attendance: 3,100

19 December 1991	Partizan (Socialist Federal Republic of Yugoslavia)	75–95	(Spain) Estudiantes Caja Postal	Fuenlabrada
	Scoring by quarter: 31–44, 44–51
		Report		Arena: Polideportivo Fernando Martín; Attendance: 3,600

9 January 1992	Aris (Greece)	75–83	(Socialist Federal Republic of Yugoslavia) Partizan	Thessaloniki
	Scoring by quarter: 38–41, 37–42
		Report		Arena: Nick Galis Hall; Attendance: 3,500

16 January 1992	Partizan (Socialist Federal Republic of Yugoslavia)	111–77	(Netherlands) Commodore	Fuenlabrada
	Scoring by quarter: 56–42, 55–35
		Report		Arena: Polideportivo Fernando Martín; Attendance: 2,000

23 January 1992	Maes Pils (Belgium)	86–72	(Socialist Federal Republic of Yugoslavia) Partizan	Mechelen
	Scoring by quarter: 37–32, 49–40
		Report		Arena: Sporthal Arena; Attendance: 1,500

30 January 1992	Philips Milano (Italy)	89–94	(Socialist Federal Republic of Yugoslavia) Partizan	Milan
	Scoring by quarter: 36–44, 53–50
		Report		Arena: Forum di Assago; Attendance: 6,500

6 February 1992	Partizan (Socialist Federal Republic of Yugoslavia)	76–75	(Spain) Montigalà Joventut	Fuenlabrada
		Report		Arena: Polideportivo Fernando Martín

13 February 1992	Partizan (Socialist Federal Republic of Yugoslavia)	93–69	(Germany) Bayer 04 Leverkusen	Fuenlabrada
	Scoring by quarter: 41–31, 39–42
		Report		Arena: Polideportivo Fernando Martín; Attendance: 2,800

20 February 1992	Estudiantes Caja Postal (Spain)	75–72	(Socialist Federal Republic of Yugoslavia) Partizan	Madrid
	Scoring by quarter: 33–38, 42–34
		Report		Arena: Palacio de Deportes de la Comunidad de Madrid; Attendance: 10,500

27 February 1992	Partizan (Socialist Federal Republic of Yugoslavia)	99–65	(Greece) Aris	Fuenlabrada
	Scoring by quarter: 51–36, 48–29
		Report		Arena: Polideportivo Fernando Martín; Attendance: 2,500

=== Quarterfinal ===
12 March 1992	Partizan (Socialist Federal Republic of Yugoslavia)	78–65 (Series: 1–0)	(Italy) Knorr Bologna	Belgrade
	Scoring by quarter: 42–35, 36–30
	Pts: Đorđević 26	Report		Arena: Pionir Hall

17 March 1992	Knorr Bologna (Italy)	61–60 (Series: 1–1)	(Socialist Federal Republic of Yugoslavia) Partizan	Casalecchio di Reno
	Scoring by quarter: 26–27, 35–33
	Pts: Brunamonti 20	Report	Pts: Danilović 19	Attendance: 5,895

19 March 1992	Knorr Bologna (Italy)	65–69 (Series: 1–2)	(Socialist Federal Republic of Yugoslavia) Partizan	Casalecchio di Reno
	Scoring by quarter: 33–29, 32–40
	Pts: Binelli 23	Report	Pts: Danilović 23	Attendance: 6,273

=== Final Four ===
==== Semifinal ====
14 April 1992	Partizan (Socialist Federal Republic of Yugoslavia)	82–75	(Italy) Philips Milano	Istanbul
19:00	Scoring by quarter: 31–35, 51–40
	Pts: Danilović 22; Rebs: Danilović 10; Asts: Danilović 3	Report	Pts: Dawkins 21; Rebs: Dawkins 19; Asts: Montecchi 6	Arena: Abdi İpekçi Arena; Attendance: 8,000; Referees: Costas Rigas (GRE), Philippe Leemann (SUI)

==== Final ====
16 April 1992	Partizan (Socialist Federal Republic of Yugoslavia)	71–70	(Spain) Montigalà Joventut	Istanbul
21:00	Scoring by quarter: 40–34, 31–36
	Pts: Danilović 25; Rebs: Danilović, Dragutinović 5 Asts: Đorđević 3	Report	Pts: Pressley 20; Rebs: Morales, Pressley 9 Asts: R. Jofresa, Thompson 2	Arena: Abdi İpekçi Arena; Attendance: 12,000; Referees: Reuven Virovnik (ISR), Philippe Leemann (SUI)
