= 1975–76 KK Partizan season =

Partizan
1975–76 season
- President: Momčilo Cemović
- Head coach: Borislav Ćorković
- Yugoslav First Basketball League: Champion
- Yugoslav Cup: Quarterfinals
- FIBA Korać Cup: Quarterfinals

In the 1975–76 season, Partizan Belgrade competed in the Yugoslav First Basketball League, Yugoslav Cup and FIBA Korać Cup.

== Players ==
=== Roster ===
- (Socialist Federal Republic of Yugoslavia) Dragan Kićanović
- (Socialist Federal Republic of Yugoslavia) Dražen Dalipagić
- (Socialist Federal Republic of Yugoslavia) Josip Farčić
- (Socialist Federal Republic of Yugoslavia) Dušan Kerkez
- (Socialist Federal Republic of Yugoslavia) Branimir Popović
- (Socialist Federal Republic of Yugoslavia) Dragan Todorić
- (Socialist Federal Republic of Yugoslavia) Boris Beravs
- (Socialist Federal Republic of Yugoslavia) Goran Latifić
- (Socialist Federal Republic of Yugoslavia) Dragan Đukić
- (Socialist Federal Republic of Yugoslavia) Vojislav Višekruna
- (Socialist Federal Republic of Yugoslavia) Dušan Pavlović
- (Socialist Federal Republic of Yugoslavia) Zoran Kostić
- (Socialist Federal Republic of Yugoslavia) Radenko Orlović
- (Socialist Federal Republic of Yugoslavia) Zoran Koprivica
- (Socialist Federal Republic of Yugoslavia) Miodrag Marić
- (Socialist Federal Republic of Yugoslavia) Slobodan Spasov

== Yugoslav First Basketball League ==
	Regular season ranking 1975-76	G	V	P	PF	PS	Pt
1.	Partizan	26	22	4	2435	2255	44
2.	Jugoplastika	26	20	6	2456	2189	40
3.	Bosna	26	18	8	2502	2291	36
4.	Beko Beograd	26	16	10	2462	2191	32

=== Regular season ===
12 October 1975 1	Partizan	105–80	Industromontaža	Belgrade
	Pts: Dalipagić 32		Pts: Nakić 23	Arena: Hala sportova Attendance: 2,000

18 October 1975 2	Željezničar	90–92	Partizan	Sarajevo
	Pts: Maravić 34		Pts: Kićanović 32	Arena: Skenderija; Attendance: 1,500

26 October 1975 3	Partizan	99–86	Borac Čačak	Belgrade
	Pts: Dalipagić 34		Pts: Mišović 20	Arena: Hala sportova Attendance: 3,000

30 October 1975 4	Radnički Beograd	106–98	Partizan	Belgrade
	Pts: Marović 30		Pts: Kićanović 47	Arena: Hala sportova Attendance: 1,500

1 November 1975 5	Partizan	86–84(OT)	Zadar	Belgrade
	Pts: Dalipagić 38		Pts: Perinčić 31	Arena: Hala sportova Attendance: 2,500

9 November 1975 6	Partizan	81–80	Metalac Valjevo	Belgrade
	Pts: Dalipagić 25		Pts: Kovačević 30	Arena: Hala sportova Attendance: 2,500

13 November 1975 7	Lokomotiva	94–96	Partizan	Zagreb
	Pts: Plećaš 36		Pts: Kićanović 30	Arena: Dom Sportova; Attendance: 3,000

15 November 1975 8	Partizan	93–85	Bosna	Belgrade
	Pts: Dalipagić 37		Pts: Varajić 25	Arena: Hala sportova Attendance: 4,000

6 December 1975 9	Olimpija	97–102	Partizan	Ljubljana
	Pts: Ivanović 23		Pts: Dalipagić 41	Arena: Tivoli Hall; Attendance: 4,000

14 December 1975 10	Partizan	82–77	Jugoplastika	Belgrade
	Pts: Kićanović 38		Pts: Jerkov 29	Arena: Hala sportova Attendance: 4,000

20 December 1975 11	Beko Beograd	87–94	Partizan	Belgrade
	Pts: Žižić 19		Pts: Dalipagić, Kićanović 24	Arena: Dom pionira i omladine Voždovac; Attendance: 4,000

25 December 1975 12	Partizan	96–91	Crvena zvezda	Belgrade
	Pts: Kićanović 30		Pts: Simonović 30	Arena: Hala sportova Attendance: 4,000

28 December 1975 13	Rabotnički	96–87	Partizan	Skopje
	Pts: Bocevski 35		Pts: Kićanović 27	Attendance: 3,000

10 January 1976 14	Industromontaža	83–92	Partizan	Zagreb
	Pts: Marelja 24		Pts: Dalipagić 35	Attendance: 2,000

17 January 1976 15	Partizan	137–98	Željezničar	Belgrade
	Pts: Dalipagić 36		Pts: Maravić 40	Arena: Hala sportova Attendance: 3,000

24 January 1976 16	Borac Čačak	84–87	Partizan	Čačak
	Pts: Purić 26		Pts: Kićanović 24	Arena: Borac Hall; Attendance: 4,500

1 February 1976 17	Partizan	100–84	Radnički Beograd	Belgrade
	Pts: Kićanović 41		Pts: Marović 25	Arena: Hala sportova Attendance: 2,500

7 February 1976 18	Zadar	88–82	Partizan	Zadar
	Pts: Skroče 30		Pts: Dalipagić 29	Arena: Jazine Basketball Hall; Attendance: 4,000

14 February 1976 19	Metalac Valjevo	0–20*	Partizan	Valjevo
	Pts: Kovačević 26		Pts: Dalipagić 37	Arena: Valjevo Sports Hall; Attendance: 2,500

21 February 1976 20	Partizan	111–105	Lokomotiva	Belgrade
	Pts: Kićanović 41		Pts: Plećaš 36	Arena: Hala sportova Attendance: 4,500

29 February 1976 21	Bosna	87–88	Partizan	Sarajevo
	Pts: Radovanović 26		Pts: Kićanović 37	Arena: Skenderija; Attendance: 1,200

6 March 1976 22	Partizan	125–104	Olimpija	Belgrade
	Pts: Kićanović 34		Pts: Gavrdijančič 22	Arena: Hala sportova Attendance: 4,000

11 March 1976 23	Jugoplastika	102–88	Partizan	Split
	Pts: Jerkov 38		Pts: Dalipagić 35	Arena: Arena Gripe; Attendance: 2,000

14 March 1976 24	Partizan	100–94	Beko Beograd	Belgrade
	Pts: Kićanović 30		Pts: Žižić 25	Arena: Hala sportova Attendance: 3,000

21 March 1976 25	Crvena zvezda	88–93	Partizan	Belgrade
	Pts: Simonović 59		Pts: Dalipagić 33	Arena: Pinki Hall; Attendance: 3,000

25 March 1976 26	Partizan	101–85	Rabotnički	Belgrade
	Pts: Kićanović 43		Pts: Kovačević 25	Arena: Hala sportova Attendance: 3,000

== Yugoslav Cup ==
17 September 1975 First round	Loznica	81–110	Partizan	Loznica
	Pts: Vilotić 22		Pts: Dalipagić 22	Arena: Igralište Osnovne škole Kadinjača; Attendance: 4,000

3 October 1975 Second round	Pirot	84–115	Partizan	Pirot
	Pts: Vidanović 25		Pts: Beravs 22	Arena: Stadion u parku Gimnazije; Attendance: 3,000

22 October 1975 Round of 16	Maribor	94–114	Partizan	Maribor
	Pts: Vilfan 34		Pts: Kerkez 19	Arena: Dvorana Mariborskog sajmišta Attendance: 1,500

4 January 1976 Quarterfinals	Olimpija	100–90	Partizan	Ljubljana
	Pts: Polanec 28		Pts: Kićanović 44	Arena: Tivoli Hall; Attendance: 4,000

== Korać Cup ==
=== Round of 16 ===
==== Group C ====
	Team	Pld	Pts	W	L	PF	PA	PD
1.	(Italy) Sinudyne Bologna	3	6	3	0	564	485	+79
2.	(Socialist Federal Republic of Yugoslavia) Partizan	3	5	2	1	567	566	+1
3.	(West Germany) 04 Leverkusen	3	4	1	2	511	544	−33
4.	(Bulgaria) Cherno More	3	3	0	3	504	551	−47

6 January 1976	Partizan (Socialist Federal Republic of Yugoslavia)	96–83	(West Germany) 04 Leverkusen	Belgrade
	Pts: Kićanović 26		Pts: Ecker 36	Arena: Hala sportova Attendance: 2,000

13 January 1976	04 Leverkusen (West Germany)	96–88	(Socialist Federal Republic of Yugoslavia) Partizan	Leverkusen
			Pts: Kićanović 26

21 January 1976	Partizan (Socialist Federal Republic of Yugoslavia)	99–82	(Italy) Sinudyne Bologna	Belgrade
	Pts: Kićanović 36		Pts: Driscoll 28	Arena: Hala sportova Attendance: 2,500

27 January 1976	Sinudyne Bologna (Italy)	98–75	(Socialist Federal Republic of Yugoslavia) Partizan	Bologna
	Pts: Antonelli 28		Pts: Kićanović 30	Attendance: 5,000

3 February 1976	Partizan (Socialist Federal Republic of Yugoslavia)	107–89	(Bulgaria) Cherno More	Belgrade
	Pts: Todorić 24		Pts: Stoyanov 19	Arena: Hala sportova Attendance: 1,000

10 February 1976	Cherno More (Bulgaria)	118–102	(Socialist Federal Republic of Yugoslavia) Partizan	Varna
	Pts: Spasov 41		Pts: Kerkez 20
