= 1978–79 Yugoslav First Basketball League =

- League: Yugoslav First Basketball League
- Sport: Basketball

1978-79
- Season champions: (Socialist Republic of Serbia) Partizan

Yugoslav First Basketball League seasons
- ← 1977–78 1979–80 →

The 1978–79 Yugoslav First Basketball League season was the 35th season of the Yugoslav First Basketball League, the highest professional basketball league in SFR Yugoslavia.

== Teams ==
(Socialist Republic of Serbia) SR Serbia

- Beko Beograd
- Borac Čačak
- Crvena Zvezda
- Metalac Valjevo
- Partizan
- Radnički Belgrade

(Socialist Republic of Croatia) SR Croatia

- Cibona
- Kvarner
- Jugoplastika
- Zadar

(Socialist Republic of Bosnia and Herzegovina) SR Bosnia and Herzegovina

- Bosna

(Socialist Republic of Slovenia) SR Slovenia

- Iskra Olimpija

== Classification ==
	Regular season ranking 1978-79	G	V	P	PF	PS	Pt
1.	Partizan	22	17	5	2246	2075	34
2.	Jugoplastika	22	16	6	2183	2003	32
3.	Cibona	22	16	6	2052	1925	32
4.	Bosna	22	14	8	2105	2029	28
5.	Borac Čačak	22	12	10	2052	2070	24
6.	Radnički Belgrade	22	11	11	2164	2145	22
7.	Crvena Zvezda	22	9	13	1951	2054	18
8.	Iskra Olimpija	22	9	13	1969	2050	18
9.	Beko Beograd	22	8	14	1973	2075	16
10.	Zadar	22	8	14	2110	2221	16
11.	Metalac Valjevo	22	7	15	1892	1958	14
12.	Kvarner	22	5	17	2108	2200	10

The winning roster of Partizan:

- (Socialist Federal Republic of Yugoslavia) Dragan Kićanović
- (Socialist Federal Republic of Yugoslavia) Miodrag Marić
- (Socialist Federal Republic of Yugoslavia) Arsenije Pešić
- (Socialist Federal Republic of Yugoslavia) Dušan Kerkez
- (Socialist Federal Republic of Yugoslavia) Boban Petrović
- (Socialist Federal Republic of Yugoslavia) Dragan Todorić
- (Socialist Federal Republic of Yugoslavia) Jadran Vujačić
- (Socialist Federal Republic of Yugoslavia) Milan Medić
- (Socialist Federal Republic of Yugoslavia) Dražen Dalipagić (did not play any games during the season due to serving his mandatory Yugoslav People's Army stint)
- (Socialist Federal Republic of Yugoslavia) Milenko Savović
- (Socialist Federal Republic of Yugoslavia) Milenko Babić
- (Socialist Federal Republic of Yugoslavia) Boris Beravs
- (Socialist Federal Republic of Yugoslavia) Goran Knežević
- (Socialist Federal Republic of Yugoslavia) Miroslav Milojević
- (Socialist Federal Republic of Yugoslavia) Predrag Bojić

Coach: (Socialist Federal Republic of Yugoslavia) Dušan Ivković

== Results ==
Home \ Away	PAR	JUG	CIB	BOS	BOR	RAD	CZV	OLI	OKK	ZAD	MET	KVA
Partizan	—	106–95	99–101	89–84	99–93	101–100	98–77	110–88	109–96	110–91	90–85	131–111
Jugoplastika	101–97	—	92–86	89–81	128–104	100–91	101–82	122–114	99–82	99–87	89–80	106–95
Cibona	89–93	80–78	—	99–96	100–94	96–88	102–89	116–96	93–80	101–92	84–76	115–92
Bosna	106–97	116–108	66–75	—	91–86	104–114	99–86	92–86	106–88	111–100	97–99	96–94
Borac Čačak	93–101	86–104	86–84	81–79	—	110–99	117–91	84–93	88–86	104–101	84–83	96–91
Radnički Belgrade	98–119	103–101	99–98	94–99	96–98	—	106–101	108–92	97–88	102–92	95–88	116–107
Crvena Zvezda	84–102	92–91	91–89	85–78	81–82	91–82	—	100–87	81–78	97–91	80–90	102–92
Olimpija	94–87	87–86	82–80	91–97	94–89	90–83	73–77	—	88–86	79–82	90–80	88–97
Beko Beograd	94–89	82–109	78–88	83–88	80–96	87–101	100–99	93–96	—	113–83	76–75	107–99
Zadar	91–105	98–106	99–109	99–111	99–91	97–96	111–101	100–94	99–100	—	94–88	100–86
Metalac Valjevo	103–105	72–90	78–81	91–106	85–92	95–93	78–68	81–79	83–85	111–114	—	77–76
Kvarner	101–109	82–89	81–86	95–102	105–98	91–103	107–96	100–88	109–111	107–90	90–94	—

Source: Pearlbasket
Legend: Blue = home team win; Red = away team win.
Matches with lighter background shading were decided after overtime.

== Scoring leaders ==
1. Dragan Kićanović (Partizan) - ___ points (33.8ppg)

== Qualification in 1979-80 season European competitions ==
FIBA European Champions Cup

- Partizan (champions)
- Bosna (title holder)

FIBA Cup Winners' Cup

- Zadar (Cup finalist)

FIBA Korać Cup

- Jugoplastika (2nd)
- Cibona (3rd)
- Borac Čačak (5th)
- Radnički Belgrade (6th)

== Basketball Cup ==
=== Bracket ===
Eightfinals
Kvarner	87
Celje	85
Jugoplastika	124
Beko Belgrade	101
Iskra Olimpija	94
Radnički FOB Belgrade	90
Partizan	106
Rabotnički	88
Budućnost
Elektrokosovo
Bosna
Željezničar Sarajevo
Cibona
Zadar
Marina B. Palanka	89
Sloga	87

Quarterfinals
Kvarner	100
Jugoplastika	99
Iskra Olimpija	98
Partizan	108
Budućnost	79
Bosna	105
Zadar	109
Marina B. Palanka	84

Semifinals
Kvarner	109
Partizan	123
Bosna	85
Zadar	88

Finals
Partizan	93
Zadar	86
