= 1975–76 Yugoslav First Basketball League =

- League: Yugoslav First Basketball League
- Sport: Basketball

1975-76
- Season champions: (Socialist Republic of Serbia) Partizan

Yugoslav First Basketball League seasons
- ← 1974–75 1976–77 →

The 1975–76 Yugoslav First Basketball League season was the 32nd season of the Yugoslav First Basketball League, the highest professional basketball league in SFR Yugoslavia.

== Teams ==
(Socialist Republic of Serbia) SR Serbia

- Beko Beograd
- Borac Čačak
- Crvena Zvezda
- Metalac Valjevo
- Partizan
- Radnički Belgrade

(Socialist Republic of Croatia) SR Croatia

- Industromontaža
- Jugoplastika
- Lokomotiva
- Zadar

(Socialist Republic of Bosnia and Herzegovina) SR Bosnia and Herzegovina

- Bosna
- Željezničar Sarajevo

(Socialist Republic of Macedonia) SR Macedonia

- Rabotnički

(Socialist Republic of Slovenia) SR Slovenia

- Olimpija

== Classification ==
	Regular season ranking 1975-76	G	V	P	PF	PS	Pt
1.	Partizan	26	22	4	2435	2255	44
2.	Jugoplastika	26	20	6	2456	2189	40
3.	Bosna	26	18	8	2502	2291	36
4.	Beko Beograd	26	16	10	2462	2191	32
5.	Crvena Zvezda	26	13	13	2272	2191	26
6.	Radnički Belgrade	26	11	15	2214	2324	22
7.	Lokomotiva	26	11	15	2428	2354	22
8.	Zadar	26	11	15	2218	2273	22
9.	Rabotnički	26	11	15	2231	2315	22
10.	Olimpija	26	11	15	2390	2405	22
11.	Metalac Valjevo	26	10	16	2045	2176	20
12.	Industromontaža	26	9	17	2117	2300	18
13.	Željezničar Sarajevo	26	9	17	2230	2379	18
14.	Borac Čačak	26	9	17	2115	2350	18

The winning roster of Partizan:

- (Socialist Federal Republic of Yugoslavia) Dragan Kićanović
- (Socialist Federal Republic of Yugoslavia) Dražen Dalipagić
- (Socialist Federal Republic of Yugoslavia) Josip Farčić
- (Socialist Federal Republic of Yugoslavia) Dušan Kerkez
- (Socialist Federal Republic of Yugoslavia) Branimir Popović
- (Socialist Federal Republic of Yugoslavia) Dragan Todorić
- (Socialist Federal Republic of Yugoslavia) Boris Beravs
- (Socialist Federal Republic of Yugoslavia) Goran Latifić
- (Socialist Federal Republic of Yugoslavia) Dragan Đukić
- (Socialist Federal Republic of Yugoslavia) Vojislav Višekruna
- (Socialist Federal Republic of Yugoslavia) Dušan Pavlović
- (Socialist Federal Republic of Yugoslavia) Zoran Kostić
- (Socialist Federal Republic of Yugoslavia) Radenko Orlović
- (Socialist Federal Republic of Yugoslavia) Zoran Koprivica
- (Socialist Federal Republic of Yugoslavia) Miodrag Marić
- (Socialist Federal Republic of Yugoslavia) Slobodan Spasov

Coach: (Socialist Federal Republic of Yugoslavia) Borislav Ćorković

== Results ==
Home \ Away	PAR	JUG	BOS	OKK	CZV	RAD	LOK	ZAD	RAB	OLI	MET	IND	ŽSA	BOR
Partizan	—	82–77	93–85	100–94	96–91	100–84	111–105	86–84	101–85	125–104	81–80	105–80	137–98	99–86
Jugoplastika	102–88	—	97–82	114–94	101–88	96–70	106–83	92–76	93–69	118–92	72–78	119–76	101–90	103–83
Bosna	87–88	100–93	—	91–79	108–97	120–74	104–97	109–88	88–94	90–81	97–83	113–94	99–87	104–79
Beko Beograd	87–94	93–89	89–87	—	95–85	99–88	114–105	119–106	101–82	102–91	120–88	105–85	93–89	83–75
Crvena Zvezda	88–93	83–84	84–75	85–68	—	86–73	74–88	84–87	101–91	105–94	85–73	87–72	103–71	98–62
Radnički Belgrade	106–98	90–89	90–105	100–88	80–86	—	87–86	81–78	99–83	92–91	90–78	88–87	83–80	96–90
Lokomotiva	94–96	85–86	106–119	99–105	102–78	90–83	—	84–73	87–92	96–82	83–69	99–63	89–77	89–72
Zadar	88–82	80–91	77–94	76–78	73–72	76–74	94–93	—	96–97	110–90	85–77	72–70	103–79	109–87
Rabotnički	96–87	85–91	78–86	108–101	78–72	96–88	91–83	81–76	—	96–88	73–74	85–87	97–74	89–100
Olimpija	97–102	94–102	75–78	104–91	101–82	86–77	96–94	87–85	103–76	—	86–69	98–89	100–98	115–86
Metalac Valjevo	77–92	72–73	88–87	80–72	84–108	84–75	102–111	87–90	89–85	86–84	—	88–86	81–89	96–87
Industromontaža	83–92	71–78	76–70	107–113	85–83	74–75	78–96	98–78	77–70	89–83	80–79	—	81–79	79–74
Željezničar Sarajevo	90–92	80–92	109–119	99–100	81–83	85–82	96–89	88–84	86–80	83–77	80–79	86–73	—	81–80
Borac Čačak	84–87	105–97	95–107	86–79	76–84	93–89	106–96	93–74	87–74	84–91	78–80	85–77	82–73	—

Source: Pearlbasket
Legend: Blue = home team win; Red = away team win.
Matches with lighter background shading were decided after overtime.

== Scoring leaders ==
1. Dragan Kićanović (Partizan) - ___ points (31.0ppg)

== Qualification in 1976-77 season European competitions ==
FIBA European Champions Cup

- Partizan (champions)

FIBA Cup Winner's Cup

- Radnički Belgrade (Cup winners)

FIBA Korać Cup

- Jugoplastika (2nd)
- Bosna (3rd)

== Basketball Cup ==
=== Bracket ===
Eightfinals
Jugoplastika
Lokomotiva	98
Željezničar Sarajevo	83
Radnički FOB Belgrade	79
Zadar	68
Olimpija
Partizan	114
Maribor	94
Vojvodina
Industromontaža	74
Rabotnički	85

Quarterfinals
Jugoplastika	88
Lokomotiva	85
Bosna	80
Radnički FOB Belgrade	86
Olimpija	100
Partizan	90
Vojvodina	83
Rabotnički	100

Semifinals
Jugoplastika
Radnički FOB Belgrade
Olimpija
Rabotnički

Finals
Radnički FOB Belgrade	89
Rabotnički	75
