= Arsenije Pešić =

Personal information
- Born: 10 June 1955 (age 71) Ivangrad, PR Montenegro, FPR Yugoslavia
- Listed height: 2.02 m (6 ft 8 in)

Career information
- NBA draft: 1977: undrafted
- Playing career: 1977–1989
- Position: Power forward
- Number: 14

Career history
- 1977–1986: Partizan
- 1986–1987: IMT
- 1987: Segafredo Gorizia
- 1988: Sloboda Tuzla
- 1988–1989: Vojvodina

Career highlights
- 2× Korać Cup winner (1978, 1979); 2× Yugoslav League champion (1979, 1981); 2× Yugoslav Cup winner (1979, 1987)

Arsenije Pešić (Serbian Cyrillic: Арсеније Пешић; born 10 June 1955) is a Serbian former professional basketball player.

== Playing career ==
Pešić played most of this career for Partizan. He was a member of the trophy generation led by Dragan Kićanović and Dražen Dalipagić in the late 1970s and early 1980s. He won two Korać Cups and two Yugoslav championships with the Partizan.

Pešić played the first half of the 1987–88 season for Segafredo Gorizia of Italian Serie A2. He averaged 17.4 points, 8.4 rebounds and 1.0 assists per game, oven nine games. Also, he played for Sloboda Tuzla and for Vojvodina where he finished his playing career after 1988–89 season.

== Career achievements and awards ==
- FIBA Korać Cup winner: 2 (with Partizan: 1977–78, 1978–79)
- Yugoslav League champion: 2 (with Partizan: 1978–79, 1980–81)
- Yugoslav Cup winner: 2 (with Partizan: 1978–79; with IMT: 1986–87)
