= Boban Petrović =

Serbian basketball player (1957–2021)

Personal information
- Born: 19 July 1957 Kruševac, Serbia, Yugoslavia
- Died: 27 September 2021 (aged 64) South Africa
- Listed height: 2.05 m (6 ft 9 in)

Career information
- NBA draft: 1979: undrafted
- Playing career: 1976–1994
- Position: Small forward / power forward
- Number: 8

Career history
- 1976–1985: Partizan
- 1985–1987: Reims Champagne
- 1987–1989: Smelt Olimpija
- 1989–1990: Manresa
- 1990–1993: Napredak Kruševac
- 1993–1994: Hasselt BT

Career highlights
- 2× FIBA Korać Cup winner (1978, 1979); 2× Yugoslav League champion (1979, 1981); Yugoslav Cup winner (1979)
Medals
Men's basketball
Representing Yugoslavia
FIBA World Championship
Bronze medal – third place	1982 Colombia	Team
EuroBasket
Silver medal – second place	1981 Czechoslovakia	Team
Summer Universiade
Silver medal – second place	1979 Mexico	Univ. Team
Mediterranean Games
Silver medal – second place	1979 Yugoslavia	Team

Boban Petrović (Serbian Cyrillic: Бобан Петровић; 19 July 1957 – 27 September 2021), was a Serbian professional basketball player.

== Playing career ==
A forward, Petrović played 18 seasons in Yugoslavia, France, Spain, and Belgium from 1979 to 1996. He played for Partizan between 1979 and 1985, scoring 3,618 points in 273 games which ranks him the 10th all-time scoring leader in the club's history. Also, he won two FIBA Korać Cups, two Yugoslav League titles, and a Yugoslav Cup with Partizan. Following his departure from Partizan, he played also for Reims Champagne, Olimpija, Napredak Kruševac, and Hasselt BT. He retired as a player with Hasselt BT after the end of the 1993–94 season.

== National team career ==
Petrović was a member of the Yugoslavia national team, alongside Krešimir Ćosić, Dragan Kićanović, Dražen Dalipagić, and Mirza Delibašić, that won the silver medal at the EuroBasket 1981 held in Czechoslovakia. Over nine tournament games, he averaged 7.1 points per game. Also, he was a member of the Yugoslav roster that won the bronze medal at the 1982 FIBA World Championship in Colombia. Over nine tournament games, he averaged 11.6 points per game.

== Personal life ==
Slovenian basketball player Peter Vilfan was his best man.

After having a traffic accident in September 2021, Petrović spent the last few days of his life in a hospital in South Africa where he died on 27 September. Partizan host an event in his honour on 6 October.

== Source ==
- Duško Miletković "Souly" (2016), Kuliranje Bobana Petrovića (in Serbian)
