= Nebojša Zorkić =

Serbian basketball player

Personal information
- Born: August 21, 1961 (age 65) PR Serbia, FPR Yugoslavia
- Listed height: 1.88 m (6 ft 2 in)
- Listed weight: 77 kg (170 lb)

Career information
- NBA draft: 1983: undrafted
- Playing career: 1979–1994
- Position: Point guard

Career history
- 1979–1986: Partizan
- 1986–1987: Šibenka
- 1987–1989: IMT
- 1989–1992: CVJM Birsfelden
- 1993–1994: OKK Beograd
Medals
Men's basketball
Representing Yugoslavia
Olympic Games
Bronze medal – third place	1984 Los Angeles	Team competition
European Championship for Juniors
Silver medal – second place	1980 Yugoslavia	Team
European Championship for Cadets
Gold medal – first place	1979 Syria	Team

Nebojša Zorkić (born 21 August 1961) is a former Serbian basketball player.

== National team career ==
Zorkić competed for Yugoslavia in the 1984 Summer Olympics.
