= Aleksandar Čubrilo =

Serbian basketball player

Personal information
- Born: November 25, 1975 (age 50) Zadar, SR Croatia, SFR Yugoslavia
- Listed height: 2.07 m (6 ft 9 in)
- Listed weight: 100 kg (220 lb)

Career information
- NBA draft: 1997: undrafted
- Playing career: 1993–2007
- Position: Small forward / power forward

Career history
- 1993–2001: Partizan
- 2001: Union Olimpija
- 2001–2002: CSK VVS Samara
- 2002: NIS Vojvodina
- 2004–2005: Avala Ada
- 2006: Radnički Beograd
- 2006–2007: Gießen 46ers
Medals
Men's basketball
Representing FR Yugoslavia
'22 & under' World Championship
Bronze medal – third place	1997 Australia	Team

Aleksandar Čubrilo (born November 25, 1975) is a former Serbian professional basketball player.

== Biography ==
Born in Zadar, in today's Croatia. He moved to Belgrade and spent the best years of his playing career in Serbian powerhouse KK Partizan. During his 8-year spell at Partizan, he won three consecutive national championships, four national cups and participated in 1997-98 Euroleague Final Four. In 2001 he left for Slovenian champions Olimpija, but failed to play in single official game. In November the same year he signed for Russian club CSK VVS Samara, and although he played very well the club didn't offer him another contact. He returned to Serbia and signed for Vojvodina. Due to knee injury he didn't play for almost two years, and in 2004 he returned to basketball for a brief spells in a couple of lower league clubs. After playing a minor role in German club Gießen, he ended his career at the age of 32.

=== Player characteristics ===
He could play both small and power forward positions. According to coaches Aíto García Reneses and Sergio Scariolo his main strengths were his speed, great shot from distance and great ease with which he resolved "one on one" attacking situations, but his main drawback was his physical weakness which prevented him from good defensive work. He was often compared with Toni Kukoč because of their similarity in physical and mental appearance.

=== National team ===
Čubrilo was part of the Serbian U-22 national team that won bronze medal on 1997 FIBA World Championship for Men '22 and under' in Melbourne, Australia. Although he was in contention for a spot in senior national team for couple of times, he never represented his country on highest level.

== Achievements ==
- Yugoslav league winner: 1995/96 and 1996/97
- Yugoslav cup winner: 1994, 1995, 1999 and 2000
- FIBA Euroleague 4th place: 1998
- FIBA World Under-22 Championship 1997: Bronze medal
