= 2011–12 KK Partizan season =

Partizan mt:s Belgrade
2011–12 season
- President: Predrag Danilović
- Head coach: Vlada Jovanović
- Basketball League of Serbia: Winner
- Radivoj Korać Cup: Winner
- Adriatic League: Final Four
- Euroleague: Regular Season
- Scoring leader: Nikola Peković (14.41 ppg)
- Highest home attendance: 7,500 (vs EA7 Emporio Armani, December 22, 2011)
- Lowest home attendance: 1,500 (vs Zlatorog Laško, February 4, 2012)

In the 2011–12 season, Partizan mt:s Belgrade competed in the Basketball League of Serbia, the Radivoj Korać Cup, the Adriatic League and the Euroleague.

== Players ==
=== Roster ===
Note: Flags indicate national team eligibility at FIBA-sanctioned events. Players may hold other non-FIBA nationalities not displayed.

Partizan NIS Belgrade roster
Players
Coaches

Pos.	No.	Nat.	Name	Ht.		Age
G/F	7	(Serbia)	Kecman, Dušan	1.97 m (6 ft 6 in)	93 kg (205 lb)	48 – 6 November 1977
C	8	(Serbia)	Raduljica, Miroslav	2.13 m (7 ft 0 in)	110 kg (243 lb)	38 – 5 January 1988
G	10	(Serbia)	Jaramaz, Nemanja	2.01 m (6 ft 7 in)	86 kg (190 lb)	34 – 10 July 1991
F	11	(Serbia)	Lučić, Vladimir	2.02 m (6 ft 8 in)	91 kg (201 lb)	36 – 17 June 1989
G	12	(Serbia)	Milosavljević, Dragan	1.98 m (6 ft 6 in)	91 kg (201 lb)	36 – 11 May 1989
G/F	13	(Serbia)	Bogdanović, Bogdan	1.98 m (6 ft 6 in)	93 kg (205 lb)	33 – 18 August 1992
C	14	(Serbia)	Katić, Raško	2.08 m (6 ft 10 in)	102 kg (225 lb)	45 – 8 December 1980
F	15	(Slovakia)	Čekovský, Michal	2.06 m (6 ft 9 in)	90 kg (198 lb)	31 – 17 June 1994
C	18	(Serbia)	Bešović, Nemanja	2.19 m (7 ft 2 in)	107 kg (236 lb)	33 – 8 June 1992
G	20	(Serbia)	Božić, Petar (C)	1.97 m (6 ft 6 in)	100 kg (220 lb)	47 – 6 December 1978
F	22	(Serbia)	Čakarević, Marko	2.00 m (6 ft 7 in)	88 kg (194 lb)	37 – 13 May 1988
G	23	(United States)	James, Dominic	1.80 m (5 ft 11 in)	82 kg (181 lb)	39 – 5 October 1986
F/C	25	(Serbia)	Mačvan, Milan	2.06 m (6 ft 9 in)	120 kg (265 lb)	36 – 16 November 1989
F	31	(Serbia)	Đekić, Branislav	2.07 m (6 ft 9 in)	94 kg (207 lb)	34 – 12 August 1991
G	33	(Serbia)	Anđušić, Danilo	1.97 m (6 ft 6 in)	84 kg (185 lb)	34 – 22 April 1991
F	44	(Latvia)	Bertāns, Dāvis	2.08 m (6 ft 10 in)	95 kg (209 lb)	33 – 12 November 1992

Head coach

- (Serbia) Vlada Jovanović

Assistant coach(es)

- (Serbia) Bojan Lazić
- (Serbia) Miloš Gligorijević
- (Serbia) Đorđe Šijan

Legend

- (C) Team captain
- Injured

- Roster
Updated: January 20, 2012

=== Depth chart ===
Pos.	Starting 5	Bench 1	Bench 2	Reserve	Youth
C	Miroslav Raduljica	Raško Katić		Nemanja Bešović
PF	Milan Mačvan	Vladimir Lučić		Branislav Đekić	Michal Čekovský
SF	Marko Čakarević	Davis Bertans	Dušan Kecman		Ivan Marinković
SG	Dragan Milosavljević	Danilo Anđušić	Bogdan Bogdanović
PG	Dominic James	Petar Božić		Nemanja Jaramaz

=== Roster changes ===
In

- (Serbia) Marko Čakarević (from Radnički Kragujevac)
- (Serbia) Danilo Anđušić (from KK Hemofarm)
- (United States) Acie Law (from (United States) Golden State Warriors)
- (Montenegro) Nikola Peković (from (United States) Minnesota Timberwolves)
- (Serbia) Miroslav Raduljica (from (Turkey) Anadolu Efes S.K.)
- (Serbia) Milan Mačvan (from (Israel) Maccabi Tel Aviv)
- (Latvia) Davis Bertans (from (Slovenia) Union Olimpija)
- (United States) Dominic James (from (Greece) Aris)

Out

- (Australia) Nathan Jawai (to (Russia) UNICS Kazan)
- (United States) James Gist (to (Turkey) Fenerbahçe Ülker)
- (United States) Curtis Jerrells (to (Turkey) Fenerbahçe Ülker)
- (Czech Republic) Jan Veselý (to (United States) Washington Wizards)
- (United States) Acie Law (to (Greece) Olympiakos)

== Competitions ==
=== Kup Radivoja Koraća ===
Quarterfinals

16 February 2012
18:00 CET

Report

Partizan	98–69	Mega Vizura
Scoring by quarter: 16–20, 24–14, 29–18, 29–17
Pts: Raduljica 16; Rebs: Čakarević 9 Asts: Two players 6		Pts: Miljenović 19; Rebs: Three players 4 Asts: Miljenović 5

Čair Sports Center
Niš, Serbia
Attendance: 3,000
Referees: Aleksandar Glišić, Milan Mazić, Slavimir Stošović

Semifinals

18 February 2012
18:00 CET

Report

Partizan	96–75	Radnički
Scoring by quarter: 19–25, 23–18, 25–11, 29–21
Pts: James 17; Rebs: Katić 11; Asts: James 5		Pts: Three players 14; Rebs: Two players 4 Asts: Two players 3

Čair Sports Center
Niš, Serbia
Attendance: 3,000
Referees: Marko Juras, Milivoje Jovčić, Branislav Mrdak

Final

19 February 2012
20:30 CET

Report

Partizan	64–51	Crvena zvezda
Scoring by quarter: 17–14, 15–13, 15–15, 17–9
Pts: Lučić 11; Rebs: Čakarević 8 Asts: Three players 2		Pts: Three players 12; Rebs: Thomas 6 Asts: B. Popović 3

Čair Sports Center
Niš, Serbia
Attendance: 4,000
Referees: Ilija Belošević, Milija Vojinović, Dragan Nešković

=== Adriatic League ===
==== Regular season ====
===== Standings =====
	Team	Pld	W	L	PF	PA	Diff	Pts
1	(Israel) Maccabi Tel Aviv	26	24	2	2140	1741	+399	
2	(Croatia) Cedevita	26	19	7	2193	1927	+266	
3	(Serbia) Partizan mt:s	26	19	7	2035	1806	+229	
4	(Montenegro) Budućnost VOLI	26	18	8	1884	1761	+123	

Qualified for Final four
Relegated

Pld - Played; W - Won; L - Lost; PF - Points for; PA - Points against; Diff - Difference; Pts - Points. As of 14 March 2012

===== Matches =====
8 October 2011
16:30 CET

Report

Zagreb (Croatia)	65–93	Partizan
Scoring by quarter: 19–24, 9–28, 16–22, 21–19
Pts: Simon, Kasun 16; Rebs: Šarić, May 6 Asts: Simon, Mulaomerović 2		Pts: Peković 17; Rebs: Peković 9 Asts: Čakarević 4

Dražen Petrović Hall
Zagreb, Croatia
Attendance: 2,000
Referees: Matej Boltauzer (SLO), Damir Javor (SLO), Roman Kolar (SLO)

12 October 2011
20:00 CET

Report

Partizan	86–59	(Slovenia) Helios
Scoring by quarter: 24–17, 22–9, 14–17, 26–16
Pts: Law, Raduljica 14; Rebs: Đekić 9 Asts: Four players 4		Pts: Čebular 15; Rebs: Črešnar 6 Asts: Three players 2

Pionir Hall
Belgrade, Serbia
Attendance: 6,050
Referees: Siniša Herceg (CRO), Petar Obradović (BIH), Aleksandar Milojević (MKD)

16 October 2011
17:00 CET

Report

Partizan	77–70	Radnički
Scoring by quarter: 15–18, 19–16, 17–20, 26–16
Pts: Law, Peković 21; Rebs: Lučić 10; Asts: Five players 2		Pts: Pavković, Simon 17; Rebs: Simon 5 Asts: Pavković, Marković 7

Pionir Hall
Belgrade, Serbia
Attendance: 6,020
Referees: Zoran Šutulović (MNE), Marko Juras (SRB), Časlav Čukalović (SRB)

23 October 2011
20:00 CET

Report

Partizan	68–63	(Slovenia) Krka
Scoring by quarter: 22–19, 16–19, 12–12, 18–13
Pts: Čakarević 11; Rebs: Čakarević 8 Asts: Law 4		Pts: Baxter 18; Rebs: Pavič 7 Asts: Krivec 5

Pionir Hall
Belgrade, Serbia
Attendance: 3,020
Referees: Sreten Radović (CRO), Tonči Anzulović (CRO), Radomir Vojinović (MNE)

29 October 2011
19:00 CET

Report

Maccabi Tel Aviv (Israel)	78–67	Partizan
Scoring by quarter: 28–14, 20–12, 14–22, 16–19
Pts: Farmar 14; Rebs: Hendrix 5 Asts: Farmar 7		Pts: Peković 23; Rebs: Peković 7 Asts: Čakarević 4

Yad Eliyahu Arena
Tel Aviv, Israel
Attendance: 9,000
Referees: Sašo Pukl (SLO), Srđan Dožai (CRO), Siniša Herceg (CRO)

=== Euroleague ===
==== Regular season ====
===== Standings =====
	Team	Pld	W	L	PF	PA	Diff	Tie-break
1.	(Spain) Real Madrid	10	8	2	879	773	+106	
2.	(Israel) Maccabi Tel Aviv	10	7	3	790	732	+58	
3.	(Turkey) Anadolu Efes	10	5	5	721	751	−30	
4.	(Italy) EA7 Emporio Armani	10	4	6	738	734	+4	1–1 (+2)
5.	(Serbia) Partizan Mt:s	10	4	6	739	774	−35	1–1 (–2)
6.	(Belgium) Spirou Basket	10	2	8	729	832	−103	

===== Matches =====
20 October 2011	Partizan Belgrade (Serbia)	73–84	(Turkey) Anadolu Efes	Belgrade
19:00	Scoring by quarter: 28–27, 17–21, 6–20, 22–16
	Pts: Peković 21; Rebs: Mačvan 7 Asts: three players 3	Report	Pts: Kinsey 18; Rebs: three players 4 Asts: Tunçeri 6	Arena: Pionir Hall; Attendance: 6,560; Referees: Guerrino Cerebuch (ITA), Vicente Bulto (ESP), Panagiotis Anastopoulos (GRE)

27 October 2011	Maccabi Tel Aviv (Israel)	70–66	(Serbia) Partizan Belgrade	Tel Aviv
21:00	Scoring by quarter: 19–12, 22–17, 15–11, 14–26
	Pts: Papaloukas 13; Rebs: Farmar 6 Asts: Farmar 6	Report	Pts: Milosavljević, Mačvan 14; Rebs: Peković 8 Asts: Law 4	Arena: Yad Eliyahu Arena; Attendance: 11,000; Referees: Spiros Geontas (GRE), Antonio Conde (ESP), Marius Ciulin (ROM)

3 November 2011	Partizan Belgrade (Serbia)	91–81	(Belgium) Spirou Basket	Belgrade
20:45	Scoring by quarter: 22–17, 30–27, 21–26, 18–11
	Pts: Law 26; Rebs: Mačvan 6 Asts: Law 7	Report	Pts: Mallet 19; Rebs: Mallet 9 Asts: Hamilton 7	Arena: Pionir Hall; Attendance: 7,200; Referees: J.C. Garcia Gonzalez (ESP), Marek Cmikiewicz (POL), Elias Koromilas (GRE)

10 November 2011	Partizan Belgrade (Serbia)	80–79	(Spain) Real Madrid	Belgrade
20:45	Scoring by quarter: 22–16, 23–24, 12–21, 23–18
	Pts: Peković 20; Rebs: Mačvan 12; Asts: Law 5	Report	Pts: Carroll 21; Rebs: Suárez 6 Asts: Llull 5	Arena: Pionir Hall; Attendance: 7,500; Referees: Christos Christodoulou (GRE), Boris Ryzhyk (UKR), Gianluca Mattioli (ITA)

17 November 2011	EA7 Emporio Armani (Italy)	65–69	(Serbia) Partizan Belgrade	Milan
20:45	Scoring by quarter: 12–14, 19–5, 25–20, 9–30
	Pts: Gallinari 14; Rebs: Hairston 6 Asts: Cook 4	Report	Pts: Mačvan 18; Rebs: Mačvan 11; Asts: Law 3	Arena: Mediolanum Forum; Attendance: 4,000; Referees: Emilio Perez Pizarro (ESP), Jakub Zamojski (POL), Tasos Piloidis (GRE)

23 November 2011	Anadolu Efes (Turkey)	67–58	(Serbia) Partizan Belgrade	Istanbul
19:30	Scoring by quarter: 15–17, 15–11, 19–8, 18–22
	Pts: Vujačić 21; Rebs: İlyasova 7 Asts: Tunçeri 8	Report	Pts: Mačvan 15; Rebs: Čakarević 6 Asts: Law, Milosavljević 3	Arena: Sinan Erdem Dome; Attendance: 11,200; Referees: J.C. Garcia Gonzalez (ESP), Paolo Taurino (ITA), Boris Shulga (UKR)

1 December 2011	Partizan Belgrade (Serbia)	74–71	(Israel) Maccabi Tel Aviv	Belgrade
20:45	Scoring by quarter: 24–17, 15–20, 15–11, 20–23
	Pts: Mačvan 22; Rebs: Čakarević, Mačvan 8 Asts: Lučić, Božić 4	Report	Pts: Smith 12; Rebs: Schortsanitis, Smith 5 Asts: Farmar, Ohayon 3	Arena: Pionir Hall; Attendance: 7,036; Referees: Carl Jungebrand (FIN), Boris Ryzhyk (UKR), Nicola Maestre (FRA)

8 December 2011	Spirou Basket (Belgium)	84–79	(Serbia) Partizan Belgrade	Charleroi
20:30	Scoring by quarter: 13–18, 24–20, 32–23, 15–18
	Pts: Mallet 22; Rebs: Green 7 Asts: Welsch 4	Report	Pts: Law 22; Rebs: Mačvan 12; Asts: Kecman 3	Arena: Spiroudome; Attendance: 5,000; Referees: Jose Martín (ESP), Jakub Zamojski (POL), Emilio Perez Pizarro (ESP)

14 December 2011	Real Madrid (Spain)	101–83	(Serbia) Partizan Belgrade	Madrid
20:45	Scoring by quarter: 27–15, 25–22, 24–19, 25–27
	Pts: Carroll 22; Rebs: Mirotić 8 Asts: Rodríguez 8	Report	Pts: Mačvan 16; Rebs: Raduljica, Mačvan 4 Asts: four players 3	Arena: Caja Mágica; Attendance: 6,237; Referees: Recep Ankarali (TUR), Fernando Rocha (POR), Damir Javor (SLO)

22 December 2011	Partizan Belgrade (Serbia)	66–72	(Italy) EA7 Emporio Armani	Belgrade
20:45	Scoring by quarter: 18–14, 18–15, 14–22, 16–21
	Pts: Milosavljević 14; Rebs: Mačvan 11; Asts: Law 5	Report	Pts: Hairston 18; Rebs: Fotsis 12; Asts: Cook 6	Arena: Pionir Hall; Attendance: 7,500; Referees: Juan Carlos Arteaga (ESP), Christos Christodoulou (GRE), Robert Lottermoser (GER)

== Individual awards ==
Euroleague

Euroleague Weekly MVPs

- (Serbia) Milan Mačvan – Regular season, Week 7

Adriatic League

MVP of the Round

- (Montenegro) Nikola Peković – Round 3
- (Serbia) Miroslav Raduljica – Round 15
- (Serbia) Milan Mačvan – Round 26

Radivoj Korać Cup

Finals MVP

- (Serbia) Danilo Anđušić

Basketball League of Serbia

MVP of the Round

- (Serbia) Miroslav Raduljica – Round 2
- (Serbia) Milan Mačvan – Round 10
- (Serbia) Miroslav Raduljica – Round 13
- (Serbia) Vladimir Lučić – Play off, Round 6
- (Serbia) Milan Mačvan – Play off, Round 7
