= Jadran Vujačić =

Montenegrin basketball player and coach

Personal information
- Born: 27 December 1959 (age 66) Titograd, PR Montenegro, FPR Yugoslavia
- Listed height: 2.07 m (6 ft 9 in)

Career information
- NBA draft: 1981: undrafted
- Playing career: 1977–1998
- Position: Center
- Number: 5, 8, 14
- Coaching career: 1998–present

Career history

Playing
- 1977–1980: Partizan
- Budućnost
- Olimpija
- 1988–1989: Partizan
- 1989–1991: Sloboda DITA
- 1991–1992: Borac Banja Luka
- 1992–1993: Borac Čačak
- 1994–1995: Budućnost
- 1997–1998: Makedonija 91

Coaching
- 1998–present: Joker Podgorica

Career highlights
- 3× FIBA Korać Cup champion (1978, 1979, 1989); Yugoslav League champion (1979); 3× Yugoslav Cup winner (1978, 1979, 1989)
Medals
Men's basketball
Representing Yugoslavia
Mediterranean Games
Gold medal – first place	1983 Morocco	Team

Jadranko "Jadran" Vujačić (Serbian Cyrillic: Јадранко Вујачић; born 27 December 1959) is a Montenegrin professional basketball coach and former player.

== Playing career ==
A center, Vujačić played for Partizan, Budućnost, Olimpija, Sloboda DITA, Borac Banja Luka, Borac Čačak, and Makedonija 91. He won three FIBA Korać Cup tournaments with Partizan. Vujačić retired as a player with Makedonija 91 in 1998.

== National team career ==
Vujačić was a member of the Yugoslavia national team that won the gold medal at the 1983 Mediterranean Games in Morocco.

== Coaching career ==
After retirement in 1998, Vujačić founded the Joker Basketball Academy in his hometown Podgorica, Montenegro. Professional basketball players such as Nikola Mirotić and Marko Todorović started to play basketball there.
