= Boris Beravs =

Yugoslav basketball player

Personal information
- Born: 12 July 1953 (age 73) Belgrade, PR Serbia, FPR Yugoslavia
- Listed height: 1.83 m (6 ft 0 in)

Career information
- Playing career: 1970–1982
- Position: Point guard

Career history
- 1970–1979: Partizan
- 1981–1982: Sloboda Tuzla

Career highlights
- 2× Yugoslav League champion (1976, 1979); Yugoslav Cup winner (1979); 2× FIBA Korać Cup winner (1978, 1979)
Medals
Men's basketball
Representing SFR Yugoslavia
European Championship for Juniors
Gold medal – first place	1972 Zadar	Team

Boris Beravs (Serbian Cyrillic: Борис Беравс; born 12 July 1953) is a retired Yugoslav professional basketball player.

== Playing career ==
=== Club career ===
During his professional career, Beravs played most notably for Partizan.

=== National team career ===
At the junior level, Beravs won gold at the 1972 European Championship for Juniors in Zadar where he was coached by Mirko Novosel.

At the senior level, Beravs went on to appear eight times for the Yugoslav national team in 1974.
