= KK Partizan =

Basketball club in Belgrade, Serbia

Partizan Mozzart Bet
- 2026–27 KK Partizan season
- Nickname: Crno-beli (The Black-Whites)
- Leagues: Serbian SuperLeague; ABA League; EuroLeague
- Founded: 4 October 1945; 81 years ago
- Arena: Belgrade Arena
- Capacity: 20,094
- Location: Belgrade, Serbia
- Team colors: Black and White
- CEO: Mlađan Šilobad
- President: Ostoja Mijailović
- General manager: Žarko Paspalj (sporting director)
- Team manager: Aleksandar Mitrović
- Head coach: Joan Peñarroya
- Team captain: Vanja Marinković
- Affiliations: Metalac Valjevo; Women’s team
- Championships: 1 EuroLeague; 3 FIBA Korać Cup; 8 ABA League; 1 ABA League Supercup; 22 National Championships; 16 National Cups; 1 Triple Crown
- Website: partizan.basketball
Home	Away

Košarkaški klub Partizan (Serbian Cyrillic: Кошаркашки клуб Партизан, lit. 'Basketball Club Partizan'), commonly known as Partizan Belgrade, or as Partizan Mozzart Bet for sponsorship reasons, is a professional basketball club based in Belgrade, Serbia. It is part of the multi-sports Belgrade-based club Partizan. The club is a founding member and shareholder of the Adriatic Basketball Association, and competes in the Serbian SuperLeague, the ABA League, and the continental top-tier EuroLeague.

Since 1945, Partizan has won 51 trophies and is the holder of the 22 national champion titles. They have also won 16 national basketball cups, 8 ABA League championships and 1 ABA League Supercup, and most notably the European Champion trophy at the Final Four of the EuroLeague in Istanbul in 1992. The final game was notable for the buzzer-beater by Aleksandar Đorđević which ranks among the most famous shots in basketball history. They also won 3 Korać Cups in 1978, 1979 and 1989 and participated in four Euroleague Final Fours. In September 2009, Partizan became the first and to this day the only Serbian team to play an official game against an NBA team.

== History ==
=== 1945–1971: Formation and early years ===
The club was established on 4 October 1945, as a basketball section of the Sports Association of the Central House of the Yugoslav Army. The first club championship of Yugoslavia was held in 1946, and Partizan participated with a team consisting mostly of players from Yugoslav Army basketball team, which in 1945 won the unofficial state championship against the teams of Yugoslav republics. KK Partizan officially split from the Army in 1953, since the entire sports society became independent and was renamed as Partizan Yugoslav Sports Association (JSD Partizan).

Although with a strong roster, including many players who played for the national team of Yugoslavia, Partizan waited for the first title of Yugoslav champion until 1976. In the first 30 years of its history, most well-known Partizan players have included Mirko Marjanović, Božidar Munćan, Radomir Šaper, Vilmoš Loci, Lajoš Engler, Čedomir Stojičević, Borislav Stanković, Borislav Ćurčić, Branko Radović, Radovan Radović, Miloš Bojović, Dragutin Čermak, Slobodan Jelić and others. During this period Partizan finished second-placed in the championship of Yugoslavia on five occasions. On two occasions (in 1950 and 1951) it even had the same number of points as the winner, but barely missed the title of national champion.

=== 1971–1981: Creating a powerhouse ===
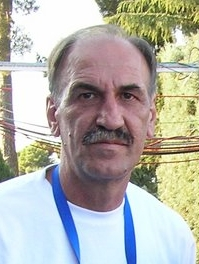
Hall of Famer Dražen Dalipagić spent 10 season with Partizan, mostly during the 1970s.

The rise of Partizan into a major basketball club that will eventually become one of the most successful in Europe, started in the early 70's, when former players took over the management and the coaching job was taken by national team coach Ranko Žeravica. He selected a group of young players led by exceptionally talented Dražen Dalipagić and Dragan Kićanović. Since Žeravica, as the national team coach (until 1965 as an assistant to Aleksandar Nikolić and then as head coach), closely followed the trends of international basketball for more than ten years, including the NBA, he aimed to combine the best features of American and Soviet concepts of the game, and adapt them to the specifics and the mentality of the players from Belgrade, Serbia and the rest of Yugoslavia. He gathered around him other young coaches, and in the late 1970s, when Žeravica went coaching abroad, his former associates Borislav Ćorković and Dušan Ivković successfully took over the team.

This important period in the club's history was crowned with several trophies. The first of these was the title of Yugoslav champion in 1975–76 season. Partizan also started to make noise in the European competitions with two back-to-back titles in the European Korać Cup (1978 in Banja Luka, KK Bosna was defeated with 117–110, while in 1979 Partizan defeated Italian Arrigoni 108–98). The first double was won in 1978–79 and another national championship title came in 1980–81.

In addition to coaches Žeravica, Ćorković and Ivković, notable players included, above all Dražen Dalipagić and Dragan Kićanović, but also Dragutin Čermak, Goran Latifić (captain of the first championship team in 1976), Josip Farčić, Dragan Todorić, Dušan Kerkez, Miodrag Marić, Boban Petrović, Arsenije Pešić, Boris Beravs, Milenko Savović, Jadran Vujačić, Nebojša Zorkić, Žarko Zečević and others.

=== 1985–1991: The new "Dream Team" ===
After a couple of quiet years and a generational shift, a new generation of top players developed towards the end of the 1980s, under the leadership of the new club director, Dragan Kićanović.

The generation of Željko Obradović, Milenko Savović and Goran Grbović, followed by younger Aleksandar Đorđević, Vlade Divac, Žarko Paspalj, Ivo Nakić, Miroslav Pecarski and Oliver Popović and led by young coach Duško Vujošević, brought Partizan back to the top of Yugoslav and European basketball.

That generation won the title of national champion in 1986–87, and in 1988, following a dominant performance in the quarterfinal round of the Champions Cup and victories over major European clubs including FC Barcelona, Maccabi Tel Aviv, Aris and Tracer Milano, qualified for the Final Four in the Belgian city of Ghent. After an unexpected loss in the semifinals to Maccabi Tel Aviv (82–87), Partizan defeated Aris (105–93) and finished in the third place in Europe. In 1989, enforced by young Predrag Danilović, Partizan won the FIBA Korać Cup for the third time, triumphing over Wiwa Vismara Cantù. After losing the first game in Italy (76–89), Partizan won the return leg in Belgrade with 101–82. That same season, Partizan won the Yugoslav Cup by defeating the crowned European champions Jugoplastika (87–74).

Continental recognition of this second great generation of players attracted more talented basketball players to the club, but at the same time, interest from financially more powerful clubs in Europe and the United States for the best Yugoslav players significantly reduced their time spent in the home country. Partizan's Vlade Divac and Žarko Paspalj in late 1989, along with Dražen Petrović from Cibona became the first players from Yugoslavia who pursued their careers in the NBA league.

First team coaches in the mid-1980s also included Borislav Džaković, Vladislav Lučić and Zoran Slavnić.

=== 1991–1992: At the top of Europe ===
After the departure of Divac, Paspalj, Grbović, Savović and other main players from the 80's, Partizan started the 1991–92 season with a rejuvenated squad, led by an exceptionally talented backcourt pair of Aleksandar Đorđević and Predrag Danilović. A previous team captain and former national team player with no coaching experience, Želimir Obradović, was chosen as a first team coach. Another former Partizan coach and player, an established European basketball expert, professor Aleksandar Nikolić became his counselor.

The season didn't start well at all - ethnic conflicts in the region had escalated towards the autumn of 1991 and FIBA decided not to allow teams from the former Yugoslavia to play their home games at their home venues. Belgrade's "Black and Whites" have opted to be "hosts" in the Madrid suburb of Fuenlabrada, in the Polideportivo Fernando Martín arena. This proved to be a right move as the Spanish crowd was very supportive of their adopted team.

Obradović's team began a long season of European and domestic matches, often traveling thousands of kilometers in just a few days, with performance gradually improving. Partizan finished the competition in the group stage in the Euroleague in fourth place with nine wins and five defeats. That meant that Partizan had to play crucial matches to qualify for the Final Four with Knorr Bologna. Bolognese had a strong team led by former Yugoslav national team player Jurij Zdovc. However, Đorđević, Danilović, Ivo Nakić, Zoran Stevanović, Vladimir Dragutinović, Željko Rebrača, Mlađan Šilobad, Slaviša Koprivica, Nikola Lončar and Dragiša Šarić came on top in three games and for the second time qualified for the Final Four.

At the Final Four held in Abdi İpekçi Arena in Istanbul in April 1992, Partizan won the title of European champion. In the Final Four, Partizan won both games – in the semifinals they defeated Italian Philips Milano and in the finals Spanish Montigalà Joventut (71–70), with an iconic three-pointer in the last second by Aleksandar Đorđević. The average age of the team was only 21.7 years, and out of 17 games all but one (the quarter-final game against Knorr Bologna) were played on foreign grounds.

The season finished triumphantly with victories in the national championship and the Cup.

=== 1992–1995: Time of isolation ===
After the Istanbul triumph, Đorđević and Danilović moved to Italy. They ended in two clubs that Partizan defeated a few months earlier, during its "conquest of Europe" – Danilović in Knorr and Đorđević in Phillips. The departure of the back-court pair proved to be an irreparable loss. Because of the UN sanctions against FR Yugoslavia, Partizan was not allowed to defend the European title in 1992–93 season. In 1993–94 season, led by coach Željko Lukajić Partizan won the national cup, and the next season was again successful. The team coached by Borislav Džaković won both domestic league and cup. The new generation of players included Nikola Lončar, Miroslav Berić, Haris Brkić, Željko Rebrača, Predrag Drobnjak, Aleksandar Čubrilo. In 1995 the UN sanctions were lifted and Serbian and Montenegrin clubs were again able to compete in European competitions. Inexperienced squad didn't achieve any significant results in their returning season in Europe, but, under the guidance of Ranko Žeravica they still defended the national title in 1995–96 and secured another season in Europe's top competition.

=== 1996–1998: Again at the top ===
KK Partizan logo used between the 1997–98 and 2000–01 seasons.

In 1996–97 season Partizan, led by new coach Miroslav Nikolić, qualified for the Top 16 of Euroleague where it was eliminated by later European champion Olympiacos. Partizan defended the title in the domestic league led by players such as Dejan Tomašević, Dejan Koturović, and Dragan Lukovski. Next season, 1997–98, was a success in Euroleague. Two years after the 3-season long UN sanctions ended, Partizan qualified for the Final Four for the third time. After a series of defeats in the group stage, Miroslav Nikolić resigned and was replaced by Milovan Bogojević and the results improved. Partizan first eliminated the reigning champion Olympiacos, and then, in the quarterfinals, the Russian champions CSKA. After the departure of Berić and Koturović, enforced with new backcourt pair Miroslav Radošević and Vladimir Đokić, Partizan went on to the Final Four in Barcelona where it took the fourth place, after playing eventual champions Kinder Bologna and Benetton Treviso. However, the season in domestic competition was unsuccessful, and some leading players like Predrag Drobnjak departed the club.

=== 1998–2001: The new millennium and the return of the club legends ===
After a disappointing domestic league ending, Vladislav Lučić was appointed as a new head coach of the club. The domestic 1998–99 season was not completed due to the NATO bombing of Yugoslavia, but Partizan still won the Yugoslav Cup, defeating FMP in the finals, in a game that was played to the sound civil defense sirens. Despite the ongoing air strikes, the game was completed. Partizan reached the quarterfinals of the 1999 Saporta Cup. At the end of the season, most of the players left the club, and another young squad was formed. Led by coach Nenad Trajković and players Radоšević, Đokić, Čubrilo, Nenad Čanak, Ratko Varda, Veselin Petrović, Dragan Marković Partizan defended the Yugoslav Cup trophy. 2000–01 season was marked by the comeback of experienced players Berić, Nikola Bulatović, Aleksandar Glintić, Branko Milisavljević while club legends Vlade Divac, Predrag Danilović and Žarko Paspalj returned as part of the club management. Darko Ruso was appointed as a coach, and Partizan reached the Top 16 of Euroleague. In December 2000 a fan-favorite Haris Brkić, who returned to club just weeks earlier, was shot and killed outside of Pionir Hall.

=== 2001–2015: The Vujošević and Danilović era ===
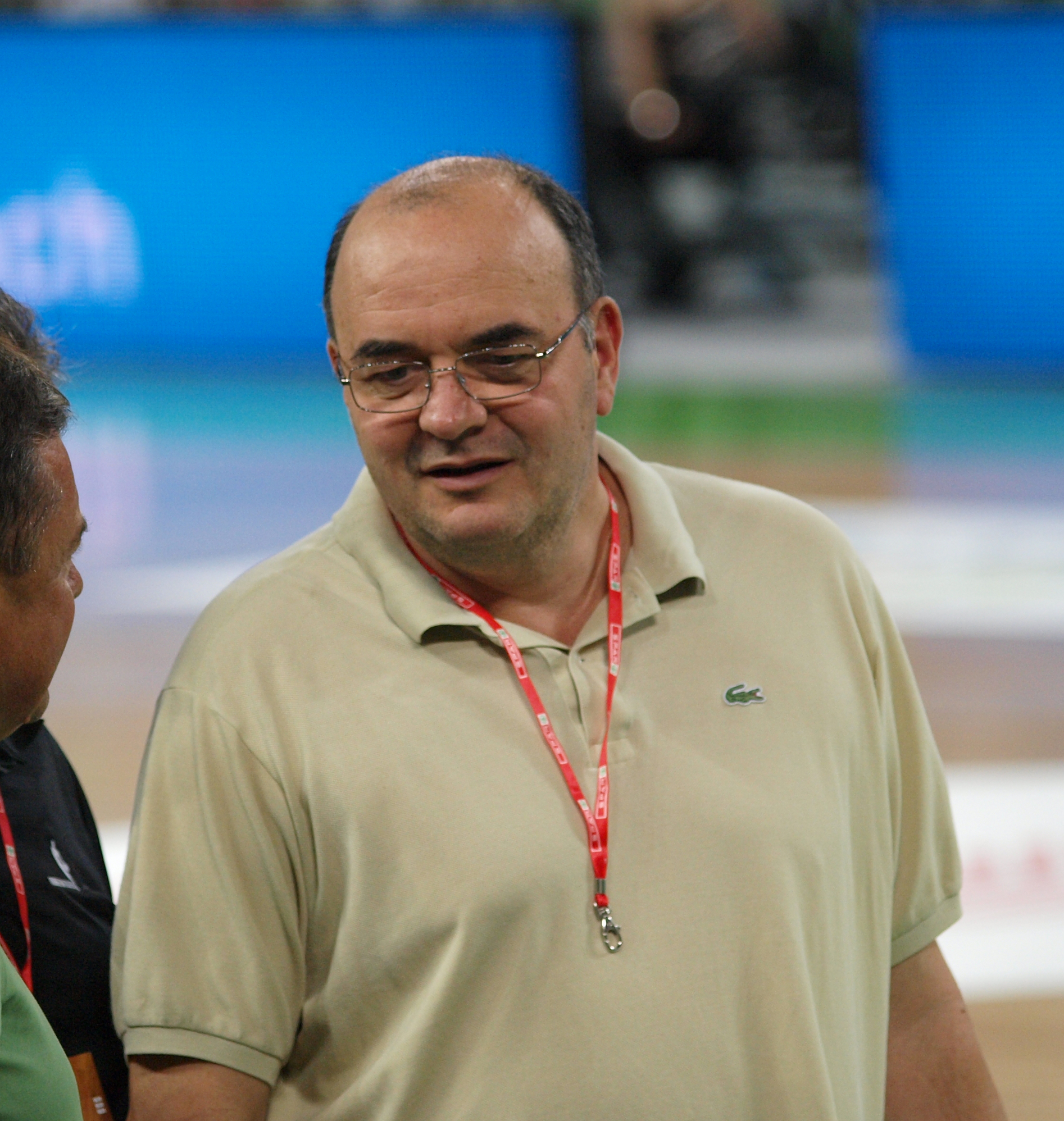
Duško Vujošević is the most successful coach in club's history.

Duško Vujošević's return to the position of a head coach in 2001 and Predrag Danilović's presidency marked the beginning of a rise in the fortunes of the club. Between 2001 and 2014, Partizan has been by far the most successful club in Serbia and the ex-Yugoslav region, winning thirteen consecutive national titles, six national cups (five consecutive from 2008 to 2012), and six ABA League titles (five consecutive from 2007 to 2011). From the turn of the century, Partizan also managed to remain fully competitive in the Euroleague, while still developing players, including some of the best big men in European basketball, such as Nikola Peković, Aleks Marić, Kosta Perović, Jan Veselý, Novica Veličković, Milan Mačvan and, before them, Nenad Krstić. The highlight of the era were the three consecutive Euroleague playoff appearances from 2008 to 2010, with the latter being the year in which the club once again reached the EuroLeague Final Four.

==== 2001–2006: Beginning of the domination in Serbian league ====
In the period between 2001 and 2006 Partizan struggled with its results in Euroleague. However, on the domestic front, Partizan was highly successful and built up for European success in the following years. During these years, notable players from Partizan champion squads included Miloš Vujanić, Nenad Krstić, Vule Avdalović, young national team players Uroš Tripković, Luka Bogdanović, Kosta Perović, Boris Bakić, Dejan Borovnjak, Novica Veličković. They were supported by more experienced players such as Vlado Šćepanović, Đuro Ostojić, Dejan Milojević, Predrag Šuput, Petar Božić, Fred House and Vonteego Cummings.

==== 2006–2010: Euroleague and Adriatic League success ====
In the 2006–07 season, In addition to the sixth consecutive title in Serbia, Partizan won its first Adriatic league trophy, defeating another Serbian club FMP, in the finals. Dušan Kecman, Milenko Tepić, Nikola Peković, with Veličković, Cummings, Perović, Bakić, Bogdanović also reached the TOP 16 of Euroleague. On 17 August 2007, Partizan signed an agreement with Bosnian club KK Igokea on technical cooperation, known as "Partizan Igokea". The season 2007–08 was a big come back to the top of European basketball. Partizan Igokea was successful in Euroleague, and strengthened with Milt Palacio, Slavko Vraneš, Čedomir Vitkovac Partizan Igokea knocked out of the competition European champions Panathinaikos, but was stopped in the quarterfinals by TAU Cerámica in a close fought encounter.

In the national league, Partizan Igokea won the first of four consecutive triple crowns, uniting the titles in national league, national cup and regional league.

In the 2008–09 season, Partizan defended all three trophies. New players Aleksandar Rašić, Stéphane Lasme, Jan Veselý played well alongside established stars Veličković, Tepić, Tripković, Vraneš, Božić and reached the quarterfinals of Euroleague again, where they were eliminated by CSKA. On 5 March 2009, Partizan and its fans became record holders, setting a record crowd of 22,567 in a game against Panathinaikos, the highest ever attendance for any basketball game held indoors in Europe. Coach Vujošević was given the highest coaching award in Europe, the Euroleague Coach of the Year Award, and Partizan was chosen by Euroleague to go on tour against NBA teams, becoming one of the selected few clubs to represent European basketball in the United States.

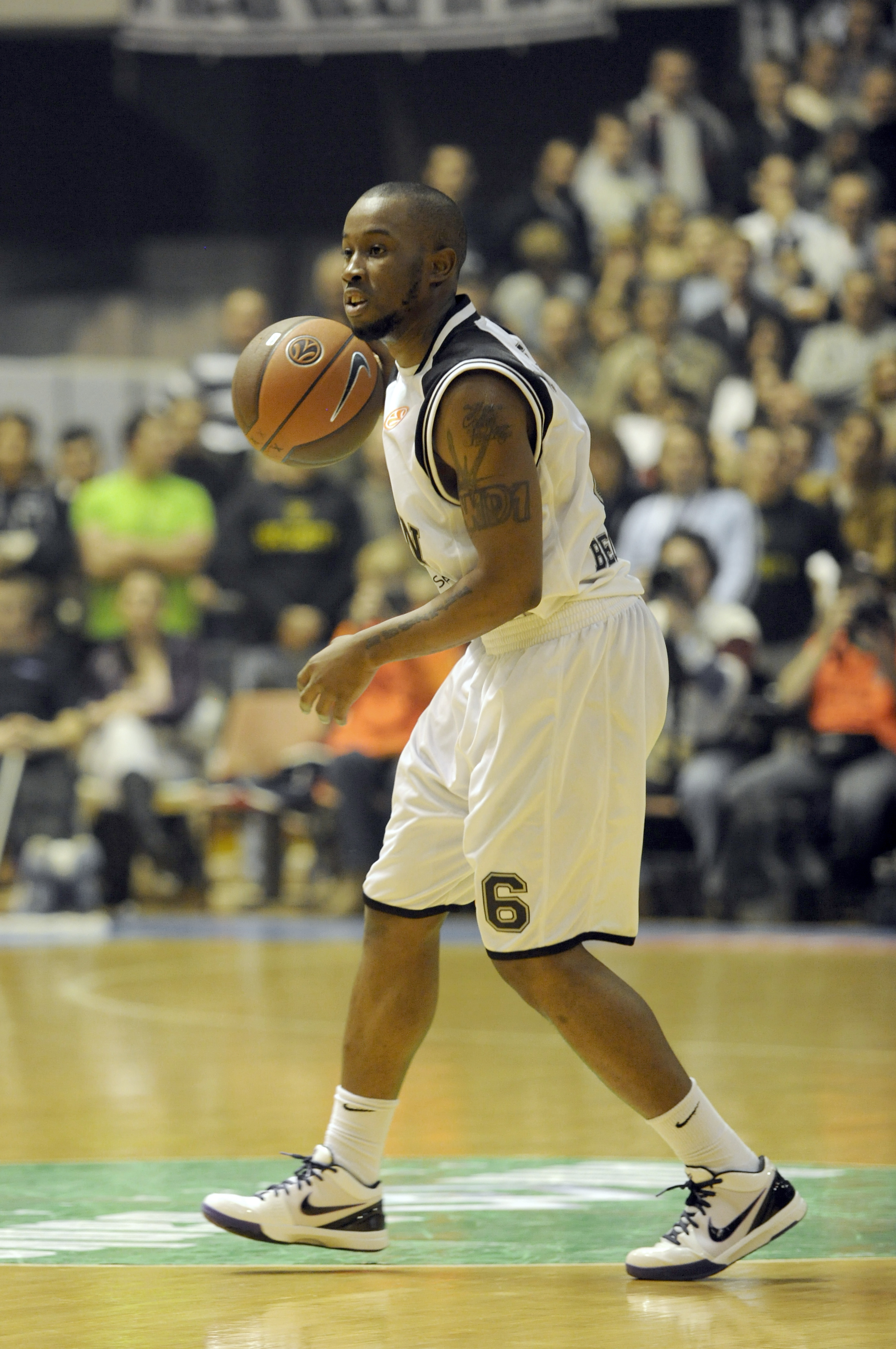
Bo McCalebb was Partizan's starting point guard during the 2009–10 season.

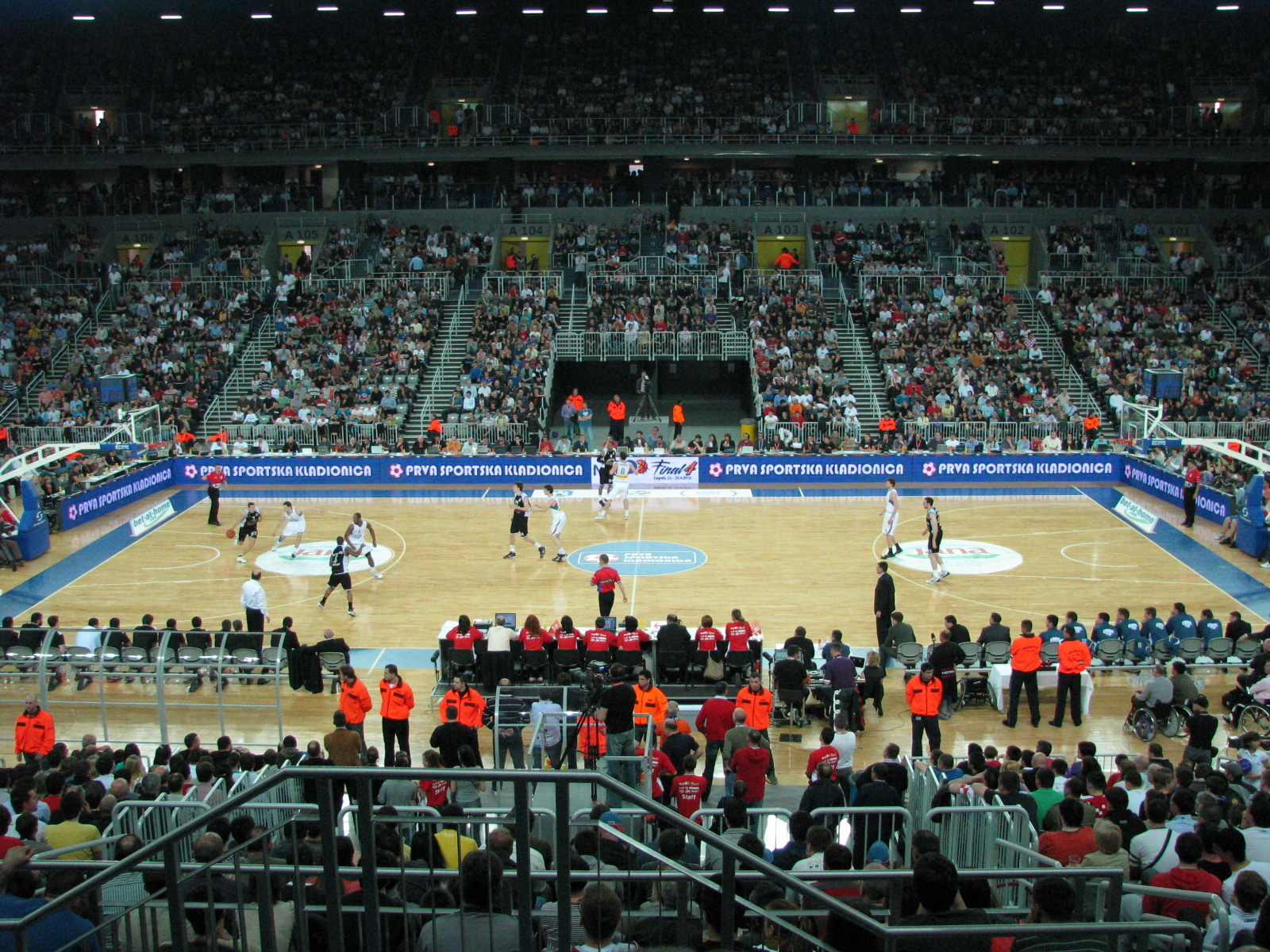
Cibona vs Partizan in ABA League Final in April 2010

The 2009–10 season was one of the most successful seasons in the history of KK Partizan. Main players from the previous seasons Uroš Tripković, Novica Veličković, Milenko Tepić, Stéphane Lasme left the club. Experienced Dušan Kecman returned and Aleks Marić, Bo McCalebb, Lawrence Roberts were brought in. Partizan played better from one game to another, and Pionir Hall remained impregnable fortress for many European greats like Efes Pilsen or FC Barcelona. Partizan again went to quarterfinals and this time faced Israeli powerhouse Maccabi Tel Aviv. Partizan went past their opponent in big style and secured the fourth Final Four of Euroleague. In the final tournament of Euroleague held in Paris, Partizan played even with their rivals but was lost in the final seconds of the semi-final to Olympiacos 80–83 and in the 3rd place game to CSKA Moscow 88–90. Both games were decided in overtime. Partizan again defended national league and cup titles.

The final game of the 2010 Adriatic league remains as one of the most memorable in the history. Played in front of the sold-out Arena Zagreb against longtime rivals from Croatia Cibona. Cibona trailed 68–72 with a few seconds left, but back-to-back triples by Marko Tomas and Bojan Bogdanović gave their team a 74–72 lead with just 0.6 seconds left. Cibona players and the crowd already began to celebrate the title, but Partizan had the game's final possession and Dušan Kecman banked in a game-winning triple from midcourt at the buzzer, to make Partizan win another Adriatic League title in front of the shocked crowd and opposition players.

==== 2010–2012: Vujošević departs ====
Before the 2010–11 season, Duško Vujošević, the most successful Partizan coach in history left the club after nine seasons to sign with CSKA Moscow. Vlada Jovanović, previously his assistant, became the new head coach. The change in coaching position was followed by changes in playing squad as Marić, McCalebb, Roberts, Vraneš, Rašić left the club. New players were brought in: Nathan Jawai, James Gist, Curtis Jerrells, Raško Katić. Along with crowd favorite Jan Veselý these players made the first five, the first time that Partizan relied mainly on foreign players. The departure of Vujošević initially affected the results, but as the season went on Partizan's play improved and the team again won three trophies – national double and the regional league. In Euroleague, Partizan achieved its primary goal and qualified for the Top 16 phase.

Again, most of the starters left the team before the 2011–12 season began. Serbian national team players Milan Mačvan and Miroslav Raduljica were loaned in, and young players Vladimir Lučić and Dragan Milosavljević got more playing time. Partizan took advantage of the NBA lockout to bring in its former player, center Nikola Peković. With most of the play revolving around him, Partizan got close to securing another Euroleague Top 16 spot, but due to an end of the lockout Peković returned to the NBA in early December. Without him, Partizan lost all three remaining fixtures and after five consecutive years, failed to qualify further. In the regional Adriatic League, Partizan was stopped in the semifinals, ending its five-year reign in the competition. On the domestic front, however, Partizan extended its success, winning another double.

==== 2012–2014: Vujošević returns with the rejuvenated squad ====
The beginning of the 2012–13 season saw the return of Duško Vujošević to the club. Petar Božić, long-term captain, retired. Vladimir Lučić was appointed as captain, and Dragan Milosavljević became vice-captain. Dušan Kecman and Milan Mačvan were also among the players who left. The squad was rejuvenated, with the oldest player Marko Čakarević being just 24 years old. Initially, the results in Euroleague suffered, with Partizan's supertalented but inexperienced squad being knocked-out of the group stage. After mixed performances in the ABA League regular season, Partizan performed well in the final four, winning its sixth regional title, and securing another season in Euroleague. In the Serbian championship, Partizan successfully defended the trophy and brought its record to twenty national titles, the last twelve being consecutive. The season was marked by the rise of young players such as Dāvis Bertāns, Bogdan Bogdanović, Léo Westermann and Nikola Milutinov.

The 2013–14 season started with a success in Euroleage, where Partizan returned to the Top16 group, with youngsters such as Joffrey Lauvergne, Bogdanović, Bertāns, Westermann, Milutinov leading the team and enforced by a former NBA player Aleksandar Pavlović. However, Partizan suffered at the Final Four of the Adriatic League with a defeat at a buzzer by Cedevita in the semifinals. Despite the shocking loss, the team bounced and finished the season by winning its thirteenth consecutive national title, again defeating their archrivals Crvena zvezda by 3–1 in the final series.

==== 2014–2015: End of era, start of hardship ====
Having lost an ABA league title and therefore a place in Euroleague after almost a decade and a half, the successful generation from the previous two season's disbanded and Partizan entered the 2014–15 season with an almost brand new squad. Despite the efforts of experienced Pavlović, Mačvan, Tepić and younger Edo Murić Partizan struggled to finished fourth in the regular season of the Adriatic League, only to be eliminated in the playoff semifinals. In Eurocup, Partizan was eliminated in the first round. Partizan was also eliminated in the Serbian Cup and failed to defend the Serbian League title, losing to Red Star Belgrade in the final series. Without any silverware won, the season was the worst in fourteen years and marked the beginning of a three year long dry spell.

=== 2015–2021: Financial struggles ===
==== 2015–2017 ====
The summer of 2015 included many organizational and roster changes. The board of directors suggested Nikola Peković, former Partizan player, for the next team president, after the resignation of Predrag Danilović. Soon after that, longtime head coach Vujošević departed and Petar Božić was offered a head coach position. Main players also left the club, with young Vanja Marinković becoming the new team captain.

At the beginning of 2016, Partizan severed the contract with Petar Božić after a worst half-season in recent Partizan history. Aleksandar Džikić was appointed as a new coach, and managed to finish Adriatic League season on the 5th position, and finish the Serbian League at the second place, losing to Crvena zvezda in the finals.

In 2016–17 season Partizan played in Basketball Champions League, having withdrawn from the Eurocup. The team captain was Novica Veličković who returned to the club. In the group stage, Partizan finished as 3rd and passed to the play-off where they were eliminated by PAOK. After being eliminated in the Adriatic League in the playoff semifinals and Serbian League also in semifinals Partizan ended up without a single trophy won for a third consecutive year. The poor finish of the season led to the departure of Džikić during the summer.

==== 2017–2021: Image reconstruction ====
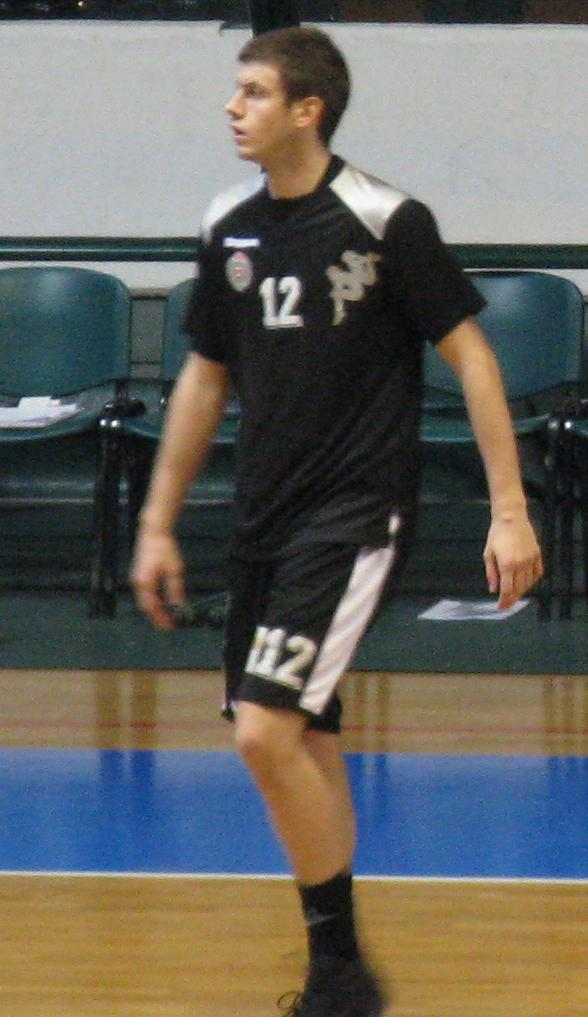
Novica Veličković, who in 2020 broke the club record with most appearances for the club

In the summer of 2017, club's president Peković stepped down, and Ostoja Mijailović replaced him. Partizan started the 2017–18 season with Miroslav Nikolić as new head coach. However, due to poor results, he was fired in December 2017. During the same month, president Ostoja Mijailović stated that Partizan owes around 7.19 million euros and that creditors are considering blocking its bank account. On 14 December 2017, former player Nenad Čanak was named as the head coach of Partizan. There were many roster changes throughout the season. One of the best players Patrick Miller left Partizan and the club signed Kwame Vaughn and Bandja Sy. After a good run in next two months, Partizan again finished on the 5th position in Adriatic League. In February 2018, Partizan won the first trophy after almost four years, Radivoj Korać Cup, defeating their archrivals Crvena zvezda 81–75 in final. Partizan played in the Eurocup but finished with a 1–9 record and last place in their group. The Superleague campaign also finished unsuccessfully because Partizan lost to Crvena Zvezda in the Playoff semifinals thus failing to win the League title for a fourth consecutive season. Nigel Williams-Goss marked this season as the top player and left for Olympiacos and later NBA.

Partizan acquired Jock Landale, Rade Zagorac, Marcus Paige and several other mostly younger players during summer 2018. After a difficult start to the 2018–2019 season, including losing five consecutive games both in the ABA League and the 2018–19 EuroCup Basketball season, Čanak resigned and was replaced by Andrea Trinchieri as the new head coach. Under Trinchieri, the performance improved and Partizan finally captured some of their former European success, qualifying for the Top16 in the EuroCup. A home loss to Rytas prevented Partizan from qualifying for the playoffs, finishing with a 2–4 record in the Top16. In regional ABA League competition, Partizan finished in fourth place of the regular season and eventually lost the semifinal series to Crvena zvezda with 2–1. Partizan defended the trophy in the Radivoj Korać Cup, again by defeating Crvena zvezda 76–74 in the final.

For the 2019–20 season, Marinković, Sy and Landale departed and Partizan rebuilt the team with Nemanja Gordić, Rashawn Thomas, Corey Walden, William Mosley and several others. Partizan started the season strongly, winning the ABA Supercup, the Radivoj Korać Cup, and leading in both the AB League and the EuroCup Top-16 group stage, qualifying for the playoffs, but eventually the season was canceled due to COVID-19 pandemic. Trinchieri left Partizan during the summer.

In 2020–21 season, even with solid additions of Codi Miller-McIntyre, and much of the previous season's roster remaining, poor coaching choices (Vlado Šćepanović (fired in November), Sašo Filipovski (fired in March) and Aleksandar Matović (finishing the year)) and a poor financial situation (which lead to a big roster turnaround during the season, with players like Miller-McIntyre leaving the club), resulted in Partizan failing to qualify to the ABA League Playoffs, with a disastrous 7th place finish (worst in club history), lost to Mega in the semifinals of the Serbian League and finished in Top 16 phase of EuroCup - out of playoff contention. This year is largely considered as the worst ever in Partizan history.

=== 2021–2025: Obradović era ===
In the summer of 2021, Željko Obradović became the team's new head coach, and Partizan started complete roster rebuild. The roster has been strengthened with players like, Kevin Punter, Mathias Lessort, Zach LeDay, Yam Madar, Alen Smailagić and Aleksa Avramović. During the 2021–22 EuroCup season, where the newly rebuilt Partizan were considered one of the top competition's favorites, Partizan finished second in the group A, but was eliminated in the eightfinal by the 7th seed of group B Frutti Extra Bursaspor 95–103 in Belgrade - a huge disappointment for the club. Partizan also made it to the Playoffs Finals series of the 2021–22 ABA League, where they lost with 3–2 in closely contested series to Crvena zvezda - another big disappointment for the team. KK Partizan refused to play in the Basketball League of Serbia.

In the summer of 2022, Partizan received a wild card from the EuroLeague to compete in the competition for the 2022–23 season; it would be return to the competition after eight years. Several new players joined the roster, Dante Exum, Ioannis Papapetrou, James Nunnally and Danilo Anđušić. On 20 October 2022 Partizan won their first game in EuroLeague after 3.121 days by beating Virtus Bologna 90–62 in Štark Arena. At the end of the EuroLeague Regular Season, Partizan finished in sixth place with 20 wins and 14 losses and secured participation in the Playoffs. In the Playoffs, Partizan was defeated by Real Madrid 3–2 in the series. The series was marked by a massive brawl between the players that occurred in the second game with 1 minute and 40 seconds remaining when Sergio Llull made Flagrant foul on Punter. The fight resulted in the injury of Dante Exum after a brutal move by Guerschon Yabusele. The Euroleague imposed suspensions for Punter and Mathias Lessort on the Partizan side and Gabriel Deck and Yabusele on the Real side. Partizan ended the 2022–23 season by lifting the ABA League championship trophy, after 3–2 score against Crvena zvezda in the Finals series; team captain Punter won the ABA League Finals MVP award for his performances.

The 2023–24 season was deemed to be unsuccessful for Partizan as they finished the season without lifting any trophy.

The 2024–25 season, with a reconstructed team, Partizan managed to lift the record eighth ABA League championship, and the Serbian League championship after 11 seasons. Following the series of poor results during the 2025–26 season, winning only 3 of 11 games, Obradović resigned as head coach, with Joan Peñarroya taking over the team; however, Partizan finished the season trophyless.

== Sponsorship naming ==
Partizan has had several denominations through the years due to its sponsorship:

- Partizan Sintelon: 1993–1994
- Partizan Inex: 1995–1997
- Partizan Zepter: 1997–1998
- Partizan ICN: 2000–2002
- Partizan Mobtel: 2002–2004
- Partizan Pivara MB: 2004–2006
- Partizan Igokea: 2007–2009
- Partizan mt:s: 2011–2013
- Partizan NIS: 2013–2022
- Partizan Mozzart Bet: 2022–present

== Supporters ==
Grobari (Serbian Cyrillic: Гробари, English: The Gravediggers) are supporters of the Belgrade football club Partizan. They generally support all clubs within the Partizan multi-sport club, especially football and basketball club. According to the "Ultras World" organization, which gathers over 400,000 fans on social networks, they are ranked in the TOP 10 supporters in the world. In March 2009, in Kombank Arena in the Euroleague TOP 16 game between Partizan and Panathinaikos, Grobari appointed the league's attendance record – 22,567. Partizan has been the most watched team for many years in a row in Adriatic League. In the 2022–23 EuroLeague season, Partizan set a record with the highest total attendance of 340,816 spectators. In the 2023–24 EuroLeague season, Partizan's fans registered the largest average home attendance in EuroLeague history, with 19,916 fans attending each match. Last season, Partizan had a huge attendance of 17,938. This year, the average of 19,916 spectators would've been the fourth-largest in the (NBA), with only the Chicago Bulls (20,624), Dallas Mavericks (20,217), and Philadelphia 76ers (20,041) overtaking the Serbian club.

== Home arenas ==
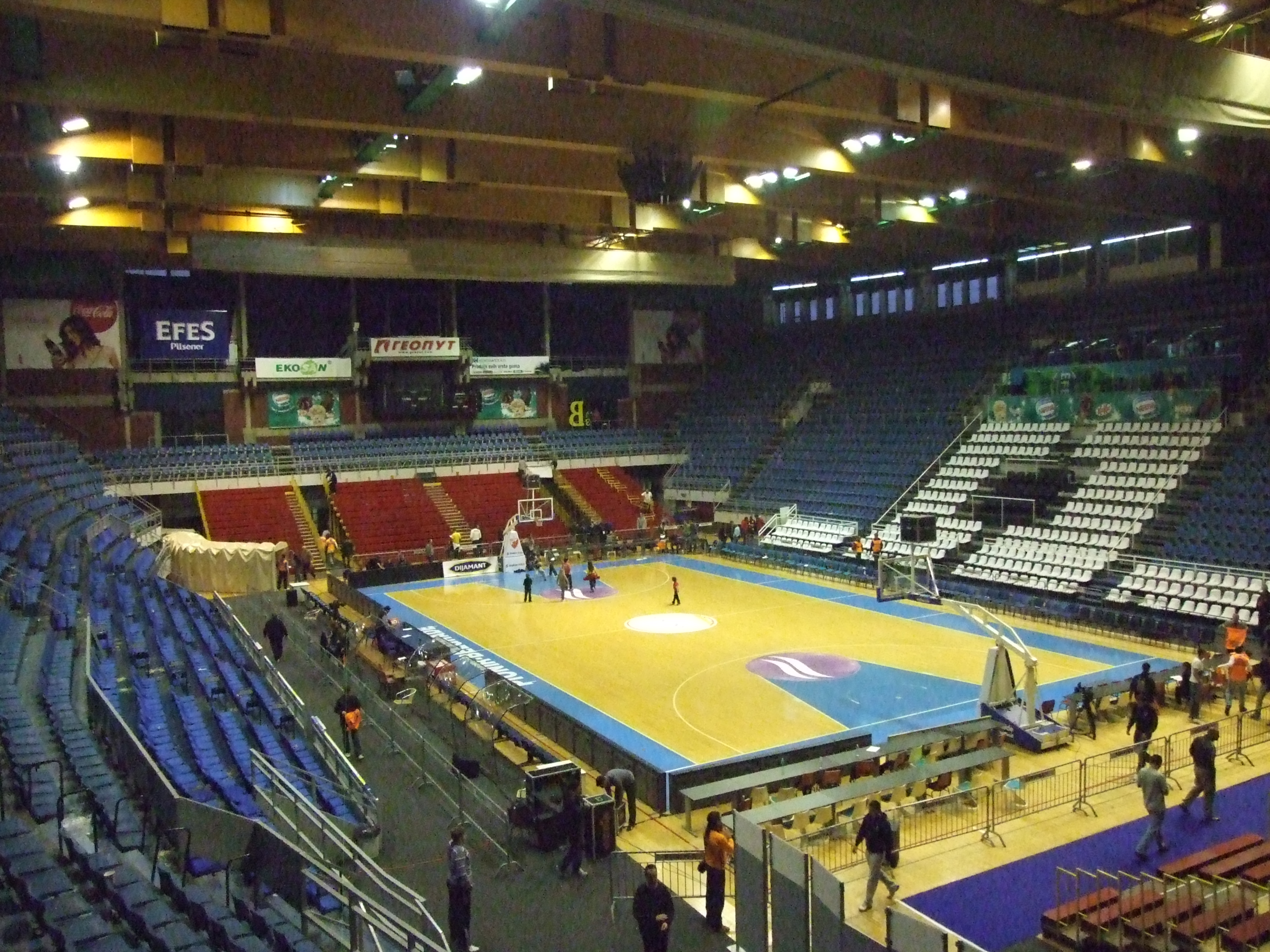
Aleksandar Nikolić Hall, home arena of the KK Partizan from 1992

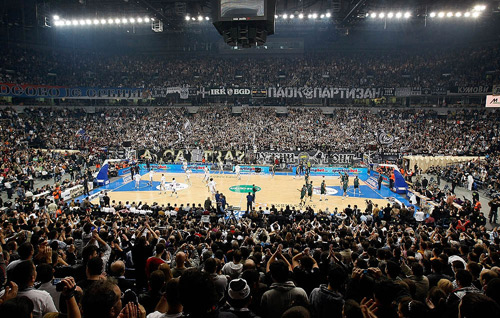
Štark Arena, current home arena, formerly used only for EuroLeague games

Partizan until recently played most of their home games at Aleksandar Nikolić Hall, located in the Belgrade municipality of Palilula. The arena, then named Pionir Hall, was built in 1973 in eleven months, by Energoprojekt. Basketball was popular in Yugoslavia at the time, and although Hall Aleksandar Nikolić hosted many different sport events (volleyball, handball) it became known as a basketball arena. It has a seating capacity of 8,000. Aleksandar Nikolić Hall is also the home of Partizan's main rival Red Star Belgrade. In the first twenty-three years (1945–1968), the club played their home games at open basketball courts on Belgrade Fortress before moving to Ranko Žeravica Hall. For 24 seasons (1968–1992), Partizan played their home games at Ranko Žeravica Hall, located in Belgrade municipality of New Belgrade.

In the 2008–09 season, Partizan played their home games of the EuroLeague Top 16 in the Kombank Arena. On 5 March 2009 against Greek team Panathinaikos, a record crowd of 22,567 was set for the EuroLeague. Partizan also holds the record for highest single-game attendance in the ABA League history, with 23,021 fans attending the match against Mega Mis on 22 January 2024. As of 9 February 2020, Partizan has been involved in the top 4 single-game attendances in the history of the regional competition (three of them as a host).

In June 2019, Partizan signed a contract with Štark Arena to be its main home arena until the end of 2023–24 season.

== Players ==
=== Current roster ===
Note: Flags indicate national team eligibility at FIBA-sanctioned events. Players may hold other non-FIBA nationalities not displayed.

Partizan Belgrade roster
Players
Coaches

Pos.	No.	Nat.	Name	Ht.	Wt.	Age
PG	0	(Montenegro)	Allman Jr., Kyle	1.91 m (6 ft 3 in)	79 kg (174 lb)	29 – 2 September 1997
PG	1	(South Sudan)	Jones, Carlik	1.85 m (6 ft 1 in)	79 kg (174 lb)	28 – 23 December 1997
G	3	(Argentina)	Vildoza, Luca	1.91 m (6 ft 3 in)	86 kg (190 lb)	31 – 11 August 1995
G/F	5	(Puerto Rico)	Thompson, Ethan (injured)	1.96 m (6 ft 5 in)	88 kg (194 lb)	27 – 4 May 1999
SF	7	(Serbia)	Nakić, Mario	2.02 m (6 ft 8 in)	97 kg (214 lb)	25 – 14 June 2001
PF	8	(United States)	Franks, Robert	2.01 m (6 ft 7 in)	107 kg (236 lb)	29 – 18 December 1996
G/F	9	(Serbia)	Marinković, Vanja (C)	1.99 m (6 ft 6 in)	90 kg (198 lb)	29 – 9 January 1997
F/C	10	(Serbia)	Tanasković, Nikola	2.04 m (6 ft 8 in)	102 kg (225 lb)	29 – 21 October 1997
F	11	(United States)	Stevens, Lamar	2.01 m (6 ft 7 in)	104 kg (229 lb)	29 – 9 July 1997
G/F	12	(United States)	Reeves, Antonio	1.96 m (6 ft 5 in)	93 kg (205 lb)	25 – 20 November 2000
C	13	(Central African Republic)	Hayes, Kevarrius (injured)	2.06 m (6 ft 9 in)	103 kg (227 lb)	29 – 5 March 1997
G/F	19	(Serbia)	Lakić, Arijan	1.98 m (6 ft 6 in)	95 kg (209 lb)	26 – 20 January 2000
C	23	(Nigeria)	Jekiri, Tonye	2.13 m (7 ft 0 in)	118 kg (260 lb)	32 – 23 July 1994
C	30	(Gabon)	Silva, Chris	2.06 m (6 ft 9 in)	106 kg (234 lb)	30 – 19 September 1996
F/C	35	(United States)	Willis, Derek (injured)	2.06 m (6 ft 9 in)	104 kg (229 lb)	31 – 21 June 1995
G	66	(Italy)	Pajola, Alessandro	1.94 m (6 ft 4 in)	95 kg (209 lb)	27 – 9 November 1999
C	77	(France)	Lauvergne, Joffrey	2.11 m (6 ft 11 in)	118 kg (260 lb)	35 – 30 September 1991

Head coach

- (Spain) Joan Peñarroya

Assistant coach(es)

- (Serbia) Mirko Ocokoljić
- (Serbia) Aleksandar Matović
- (Serbia) Oliver Stević
- (Serbia) Luka Milinković

Athletic trainer(s)

- (Serbia) Predrag Zimonjić

Team manager

- (Serbia) Aleksandar Mitrović

Legend

- (C) Team captain
- (IN) Inactive
- Injured

- Roster
- Transactions
Updated: November 13, 2026

=== Depth chart ===
Pos.	Starting 5	Bench 1	Bench 2	Bench 3	Inactive
C	Tonye Jekiri	Nikola Tanasković	Chris Silva	Joffrey Lauvergne	Kevarrius Hayes (injured)
PF	Robert Franks	Lamar Stevens			Derek Willis (injured)
SF	Vanja Marinković	Arijan Lakić		Mario Nakić
SG	Alessandro Pajola	Antonio Reeves			Ethan Thompson (injured)
PG	Carlik Jones	Luca Vildoza	Kyle Allman Jr.

=== On loan ===
Players out on loan
Nat.	Player	Position	Team	On loan since
(Romania)	Luca Illeș	PG	(Romania) U-BT Cluj-Napoca	August 2026
(Serbia)	Luka Pavlović	PG	(Serbia) Metalac Valjevo (Two-way affiliate)	August 2026
(Serbia)	Uroš Mijailović	SG	(Serbia) Metalac Valjevo (Two-way affiliate)	August 2026
(Serbia)	Đorđe Šekularac	GF	(Serbia) Metalac Valjevo (Two-way affiliate)	August 2026
(Serbia)	Uroš Danilović	SF	(Serbia) Metalac Valjevo (Two-way affiliate)	August 2026
(Serbia)	Uroš Dramićanin	F	(Serbia) Metalac Valjevo (Two-way affiliate)	August 2026
(Serbia)	Nikola Đurović	FC	(Serbia) Metalac Valjevo (Two-way affiliate)	August 2026
(Serbia)	Luka Miladinović	C	(Serbia) Metalac Valjevo (Two-way affiliate)	August 2026

=== Squad changes for 2026–27 season ===
==== In ====
No.	Pos.	Nat.	Name	Moving from		Type	Date	Source
13	C	(Central African Republic)	Kevarrius Hayes	AS Monaco	(Monaco)	Transfer	19 July 2026	
11	F	(United States)	Lamar Stevens	Paris Basketball	(France)	End of contract	22 July 2026	
66	G	(Italy)	Alessandro Pajola	Virtus Bologna	(Italy)	End of contract	23 July 2026	
10	F/C	(Serbia)	Nikola Tanasković	Budućnost	(Montenegro)	End of contract	25 July 2026	
3	G	(Argentina)	Luca Vildoza	Virtus Bologna	(Italy)	Parted ways	26 July 2026	
35	F/C	(United States)	Derek Willis	Paris Basketball	(France)	End of contract	28 July 2026	
0	PG	(Montenegro)	Kyle Allman Jr.	Türk Telekom	(Turkey)	End of contract	31 July 2026	
5	G/F	(Puerto Rico)	Ethan Thompson	Indiana Pacers	(United States)	Parted ways	16 August 2026	
95	PF	(France)	Bandja Sy	CSM Oradea	(Romania)	End of contract	28 September 2026	
12	G/F	(United States)	Antonio Reeves	Charlotte Hornets	(United States)	End of contract	21 October 2026	
8	PF	(United States)	Robert Franks	Nanjing Monkey Kings	(China)	Parted ways	23 October 2026	
30	C	(Gabon)	Chris Silva	Fenerbahçe	(Turkey)	Parted ways	13 November 2026	

==== Out ====
No.	Pos.	Nat.	Name	Moving to		Type	Date	Source
3	PF	(Finland)	Miikka Muurinen	Arkansas Razorbacks	(United States)	Transfer	12 June 2026	
4	PG	(Germany) (United States)	Duane Washington Jr.	Bayern Munich	(Germany)	End of contract	12 June 2026	
33	PG	(Greece)	Nick Calathes	PAOK Thessaloniki	(Greece)	End of contract	17 June 2026	
12	G/F	(United States)	Sterling Brown	Žalgiris Kaunas	(Lithuania)	Transfer	22 June 2026	
5	F/C	(Germany)	Dylan Osetkowski	Valencia Basket	(Spain)	Parted ways	2 July 2026	
17	F	(Germany)	Isaac Bonga	Panathinaikos	(Greece)	Transfer	4 July 2026	
13	SF	(Serbia)	Aleksa Radanov	Free agent		End of contract	6 July 2026	
2	G	(United States)	Shake Milton	Hapoel Jerusalem	(Israel)	Parted ways	9 July 2026	
24	C	(Angola)	Bruno Fernando	Anadolu Efes	(Turkey)	Transfer	10 July 2026	
11	F/C	(Serbia)	Aleksej Pokuševski	Lokomotiv Kuban	(Russia)	End of contract	21 July 2026	
8	SF	(Serbia)	Mitar Bošnjaković	Free agent		Parted ways	16 August 2026	
22	PF	(United States)	Jabari Parker	Free agent		Parted ways	23 October 2026	
95	PF	(France)	Bandja Sy	Lietkabelis Panevėžys	(Lithuania)	End of contract	30 October 2026	

=== Players on the NBA draft ===
^	Denotes player who has been inducted to the Naismith Memorial Basketball Hall of Fame
^{+}	Denotes player who has been selected for at least one All-Star Game
^{#}	Denotes player who has never appeared in an NBA regular-season or playoff game

Position	Player	Year	Round	Pick	Drafted by
C	(Socialist Federal Republic of Yugoslavia) Vlade Divac^{^+}	1989	1st round	26th	Los Angeles Lakers
SG/SF	(Federal Republic of Yugoslavia) Predrag Danilović	1992	2nd round	43rd	Golden State Warriors
C	(Federal Republic of Yugoslavia) Željko Rebrača	1994	2nd round	54th	Seattle SuperSonics
PF/C	(Federal Republic of Yugoslavia) Predrag Drobnjak	1997	2nd round	48th	Washington Bullets
C	(Federal Republic of Yugoslavia) Nenad Krstić	2002	1st round	24th	New Jersey Nets
PG/SG	(Federal Republic of Yugoslavia) Miloš Vujanić^{#}	2002	2nd round	36th	New York Knicks
C	(Serbia) Kosta Perović	2006	2nd round	38th	Golden State Warriors
C	(Montenegro) Nikola Peković	2008	2nd round	31st	Minnesota Timberwolves
PF/C	(Czech Republic) Jan Veselý	2011	1st round	6th	Washington Wizards
C/PF	(France) Joffrey Lauvergne	2013	2nd round	55th	Memphis Grizzlies, traded to Denver Nuggets
SG/SF	(Serbia) Bogdan Bogdanović	2014	1st round	27th	Phoenix Suns
C	(Serbia) Nikola Milutinov^{#}	2015	1st round	26th	San Antonio Spurs
SG	(Serbia) Vanja Marinković^{#}	2019	2nd round	60th	Sacramento Kings
PF/C	(Serbia) Tristan Vukčević	2023	2nd round	42nd	Washington Wizards

=== Team captains ===
- (Socialist Federal Republic of Yugoslavia) Goran Latifić (197?–1977)
- (Socialist Federal Republic of Yugoslavia) Boris Beravs (1977–1979)
- (Socialist Federal Republic of Yugoslavia) Dražen Dalipagić (1979–1980)
- (Socialist Federal Republic of Yugoslavia) Dragan Kićanović (1980–1981)
- (Socialist Federal Republic of Yugoslavia) Dražen Dalipagić (1981–1982)
- (Socialist Federal Republic of Yugoslavia) Dragan Todorić (1982–1983)
- (Socialist Federal Republic of Yugoslavia) Arsenije Pešić (1983–1984)
- (Socialist Federal Republic of Yugoslavia) Miodrag Marić (1984–1986)
- (Socialist Federal Republic of Yugoslavia) Milenko Savović (1986–1987)
- (Socialist Federal Republic of Yugoslavia) Goran Grbović (1987–1988)
- (Socialist Federal Republic of Yugoslavia) Milenko Savović (1988–1989)
- (Socialist Federal Republic of Yugoslavia) Predrag Danilović (1989–1990)
- (Socialist Federal Republic of Yugoslavia) Željko Obradović (1990–1991)
- (Socialist Federal Republic of Yugoslavia) Aleksandar Đorđević (1991–1992)
- (Federal Republic of Yugoslavia) Slaviša Koprivica (1992–1993)
- (Federal Republic of Yugoslavia) Nikola Lončar (1993–1994)
- (Federal Republic of Yugoslavia) Zoran Stevanović (1994–1996)
- (Federal Republic of Yugoslavia) Miroslav Berić (1996–1997)
- (Federal Republic of Yugoslavia) Haris Brkić (1997–1999)
- (Federal Republic of Yugoslavia) Miroslav Radošević (1999–2000)
- (Federal Republic of Yugoslavia) Miroslav Berić (2000–2001)
- (Federal Republic of Yugoslavia) Veselin Petrović (2001–2002)
- (Federal Republic of Yugoslavia) Nenad Čanak (2002–2003)
- (Serbia and Montenegro) Đuro Ostojić (2003–2004)
- (Serbia and Montenegro) Vule Avdalović (2004–2005)
- (Serbia and Montenegro) Dejan Milojević (2005–2006)
- (Serbia) Petar Božić (2006–2012)
- (Serbia) Vladimir Lučić (2012–2013)
- (Serbia) Dragan Milosavljević (2013–2014)
- (France) Joffrey Lauvergne (2014)
- (Serbia) Dragan Milosavljević (2014–2015)
- (Serbia) Vanja Marinković (2015–2016)
- (Serbia) Novica Veličković (2016–2021)
- (Serbia) Rade Zagorac (2021–2022)
- (United States) Kevin Punter (2022–2024)
- (Serbia) Vanja Marinković (2024–present)

=== Second-generation players ===
The following is a list of father-and-son combinations who have played for Partizan.

Father	Son(s)	Ref.
(Socialist Federal Republic of Yugoslavia) Dražen Dalipagić	(Federal Republic of Yugoslavia) Davorin Dalipagić	
(Socialist Federal Republic of Yugoslavia) Milovan Bogojević	(Germany) Vladimir Bogojević	
(Socialist Federal Republic of Yugoslavia) Miroslav Pecarski	(Serbia) Marko Pecarski	
(Federal Republic of Yugoslavia) Slaviša Koprivica	(Serbia) Balša Koprivica	
(Socialist Federal Republic of Yugoslavia) Ivo Nakić	(Serbia) Mario Nakić	

=== Notable players ===
Numerous Partizan players have won medals competing for their national teams and several have been internationally recognized for their outstanding contribution to the game of basketball:

- Dražen Dalipagić: enshrined in the Basketball Hall of Fame in 2004, enshrined in the FIBA Hall of Fame in 2007, included in 50 Greatest EuroLeague Contributors.
- Vlade Divac: enshrined in the Basketball Hall of Fame in 2019, enshrined in the FIBA Hall of Fame in 2010, included in 50 Greatest EuroLeague Contributors.
- Dragan Kićanović: enshrined in the FIBA Hall of Fame in 2010.
- Aleksandar Đorđević: included in 50 Greatest EuroLeague Contributors.
- Predrag Danilović: included in 50 Greatest EuroLeague Contributors.

Partizan has provided a number of NBA players since 1989. In total, thirteen were drafted while at Partizan with five of them selected in the first round of the NBA draft, with the highest pick being the 6th place on the 2011 NBA draft for Jan Veselý. Most notable NBA players who came through the ranks of Partizan include the likes of Hall-of-Famer Vlade Divac and rookie-all stars Željko Rebrača, Nenad Krstić and Bogdan Bogdanović.

Note: Flags indicate national team eligibility at FIBA-sanctioned events. Players may hold other non-FIBA nationalities not displayed.

Criteria

To appear in this section a player must have either:

- Set a club record or won an individual award while at the club
- Played at least one official international match for their national team at any time
- Played at least one official NBA match at any time.

- (Serbia) Mihajlo Andrić
- (Serbia) Danilo Anđušić
- (Serbia) Aleksa Avramović
- (Serbia) Stefan Birčević
- (Serbia) Bogdan Bogdanović
- (Serbia) Luka Bogdanović
- (Serbia) Mitar Bošnjaković
- (Serbia) Petar Božić
- (Serbia) Đorđe Gagić
- (Serbia) Ognjen Jaramaz
- (Serbia) Dušan Kecman
- (Serbia) Raško Katić
- (Serbia) Balša Koprivica
- (Serbia) Nenad Krstić
- (Serbia) Arijan Lakić
- (Serbia) Vladimir Lučić
- (Serbia) Milan Mačvan
- (Serbia) Vanja Marinković
- (Serbia) Vladimir Micov
- (Serbia) Dušan Miletić
- (Serbia) Dragan Milosavljević
- (Serbia) Nikola Milutinov
- (Serbia) Dejan Musli
- (Serbia) Mario Nakić
- (Serbia) Kosta Perović
- (Serbia) Aleksej Pokuševski
- (Serbia) Aleksa Radanov
- (Serbia) Miroslav Raduljica
- (Serbia) Aleksandar Rašić
- (Serbia) Alen Smailagić
- (Serbia) Nikola Tanasković
- (Serbia) Milenko Tepić
- (Serbia) Uroš Trifunović
- (Serbia) Uroš Tripković
- (Serbia) Novica Veličković
- (Serbia) Čedomir Vitkovac
- (Serbia) Tristan Vukčević
- (Serbia) Rade Zagorac
- (Socialist Federal Republic of Yugoslavia) Boris Beravs
- (Socialist Federal Republic of Yugoslavia) Miloš Bojović
- (Socialist Federal Republic of Yugoslavia) Dragutin Čermak
- (Socialist Federal Republic of Yugoslavia) Dražen Dalipagić
- (Socialist Federal Republic of Yugoslavia) Predrag Danilović
- (Socialist Federal Republic of Yugoslavia) Vlade Divac
- (Socialist Federal Republic of Yugoslavia) Aleksandar Đorđević
- (Socialist Federal Republic of Yugoslavia) Predrag Drobnjak
- (Socialist Federal Republic of Yugoslavia) Lajos Engler
- (Socialist Federal Republic of Yugoslavia) Goran Grbović
- (Socialist Federal Republic of Yugoslavia) Dušan Kerkez
- (Socialist Federal Republic of Yugoslavia) Dragan Kićanović
- (Socialist Federal Republic of Yugoslavia) Miodrag Marić
- (Socialist Federal Republic of Yugoslavia) Mirko Marjanović
- (Socialist Federal Republic of Yugoslavia) Milan Medić
- (Socialist Federal Republic of Yugoslavia) Ivo Nakić
- (Socialist Federal Republic of Yugoslavia) Aleksandar Nikolić
- (Socialist Federal Republic of Yugoslavia) Željko Obradović
- (Socialist Federal Republic of Yugoslavia) Žarko Paspalj
- (Socialist Federal Republic of Yugoslavia) Miroslav Pecarski
- (Socialist Federal Republic of Yugoslavia) Arsenije Pešić
- (Socialist Federal Republic of Yugoslavia) Svetislav Pešić
- (Socialist Federal Republic of Yugoslavia) Boban Petrović
- (Socialist Federal Republic of Yugoslavia) Radovan Radović
- (Socialist Federal Republic of Yugoslavia) Radomir Šaper
- (Socialist Federal Republic of Yugoslavia) Milenko Savović
- (Socialist Federal Republic of Yugoslavia) Zoran Slavnić
- (Socialist Federal Republic of Yugoslavia) Borislav Stanković
- (Socialist Federal Republic of Yugoslavia) Dragan Todorić
- (Socialist Federal Republic of Yugoslavia) Peter Vilfan
- (Socialist Federal Republic of Yugoslavia) Jadran Vujačić
- (Socialist Federal Republic of Yugoslavia) Žarko Zečević
- (Socialist Federal Republic of Yugoslavia) Nebojša Zorkić
- (Serbia and Montenegro) Vule Avdalović
- (Serbia and Montenegro) Miroslav Berić
- (Serbia and Montenegro) Haris Brkić
- (Serbia and Montenegro) Nenad Čanak
- (Serbia and Montenegro) Vladimir Dragutinović
- (Serbia and Montenegro) Milan Gurović
- (Serbia and Montenegro) Slaviša Koprivica
- (Serbia and Montenegro) Nikola Lončar
- (Serbia and Montenegro) Dragan Lukovski
- (Serbia and Montenegro) Dejan Milojević
- (Serbia and Montenegro) Ivan Paunić
- (Serbia and Montenegro) Aleksandar Pavlović
- (Serbia and Montenegro) Željko Rebrača
- (Serbia and Montenegro) Vlado Šćepanović
- (Serbia and Montenegro) Mlađan Šilobad
- (Serbia and Montenegro) Zoran Stevanović
- (Serbia and Montenegro) Dejan Tomašević
- (Serbia and Montenegro) Miloš Vujanić
- (Slovenia) Edo Murić
- (Slovenia) Rasho Nesterović
- (Slovenia) Aleksej Nikolić
- (Italy) Alessandro Pajola
- (Montenegro) Kyle Allman Jr.
- (Montenegro) Boris Bakić
- (Montenegro) Nikola Peković
- (Montenegro) Slavko Vraneš
- (Latvia) Dāvis Bertāns
- (Germany) Isaac Bonga
- (Germany) Dylan Osetkowski
- (Germany) Duane Washington Jr.
- (Greece) Nick Calathes
- (Greece) Ioannis Papapetrou
- (France) Boris Dallo
- (France) Joffrey Lauvergne
- (France) Mathias Lessort
- (France) Frank Ntilikina
- (France) Bandja Sy
- (France) Léo Westermann
- (Turkey) Semih Erden
- (Albania) Dallas Moore
- (Argentina) Luca Vildoza
- (Azerbaijan) Zach LeDay
- (Brazil) Bruno Caboclo
- (Bosnia and Herzegovina) Nemanja Gordić
- (Bosnia and Herzegovina) Ratko Varda
- (Bosnia and Herzegovina) Adin Vrabac
- (Bulgaria) Codi Miller-McIntyre
- (Canada) Isiaha Mike
- (Central African Republic) Kevarrius Hayes
- (Croatia) Jaleen Smith
- (Czech Republic) Jan Veselý
- (Gabon) Stéphane Lasme
- (Nigeria) Tonye Jekiri
- (Angola) Bruno Fernando
- (Australia) Dante Exum
- (Australia) Nathan Jawai
- (Australia) Jock Landale
- (Australia) Aleks Marić
- (Belize) Milt Palacio
- (Denmark) Gabriel Lundberg
- (Finland) Miikka Muurinen
- (Israel) Yam Madar
- (North Macedonia) Vlado Ilievski
- (North Macedonia) Bo McCalebb
- (North Macedonia) Predrag Samardžiski
- (Poland) Mateusz Ponitka
- (Romania) Luca Illeș
- (South Sudan) Carlik Jones
- (Uganda) Brandon Davies
- (Puerto Rico) Ethan Thompson
- (United States) Sterling Brown
- (United States) Vonteego Cummings
- (United States) PJ Dozier
- (United States) James Gist
- (United States) Fred House
- (United States) Curtis Jerrells
- (United States) Tyrique Jones
- (United States) Frank Kaminsky
- (United States) Tarence Kinsey
- (United States) Acie Law
- (United States) Shake Milton
- (United States) William Mosley
- (United States) James Nunnally
- (United States) Marcus Paige
- (United States) Jabari Parker
- (United States) Kevin Punter
- (United States) Lawrence Roberts
- (United States) Lamar Stevens
- (United States) Rashawn Thomas
- (United States) Corey Walden
- (United States) Nigel Williams-Goss
- (United States) Derek Willis

== Head coaches ==
There have been thirty-five head coaches for Partizan since the founding of the club in 1945. The first head coach was Božo Grkinić who coached Partizan for two seasons. The first coach to bring Partizan an official trophy was Borislav Ćorković. He won Yugoslav League with Partizan in 1976. Club won the first international trophy in 1978, while being coached by Ranko Žeravica. Željko Obradović lead the club to the most significant trophy, EuroLeague in 1992. Duško Vujošević is the most successful coach in the club's history. In his four stints with Partizan he won a total of twenty-three trophies.

Several Partizan coaches have been recognized internationally for their contribution to the game of basketball:

- Aleksandar Nikolić: enshrined in the Basketball Hall of Fame, FIBA Hall of Fame (class of 2007) and included in 50 Greatest Euroleague Contributors.
- Dušan Ivković: enshrined in FIBA Hall of Fame (class of 2017) and included in 50 Greatest Euroleague Contributors.
- Ranko Žeravica: enshrined in FIBA Hall of Fame (class of 2007).
- Željko Obradović: included in 50 Greatest Euroleague Contributors.

Another former Partizan coach, Borislav Stanković, was also enshrined in both the Basketball Hall of Fame and FIBA Hall of Fame, although not as a coach but as a contributor.

== Honours ==
Partizan has won thirty-eight domestic trophies, including twenty-two national championships, of which thirteen were won consecutively, and sixteen cups, of which five were won consecutively. They have also won eight ABA Leagues, first five of them consecutive and one ABA League Supercup. In European competitions in the late 1970s, they won two back-to-back FIBA Korać Cups in 1978 and 1979. They also won another Korać Cup in 1989. In 1992, Partizan won the club's first – and to date only – EuroLeague title, downing Joventut Badalona 71–70 on a miraculous buzzer-beater by Aleksandar Đorđević, which ranks among the most amazing shots in European basketball history. Overall, Partizan has won 51 trophies, which makes it the most successful basketball club in Serbia.

Honours		No.	Years
League – 22
Yugoslav League	Winners	5	1976, 1979, 1981, 1987, 1992
FR Yugoslavia/Serbia and Montenegro League	Winners	8	1995, 1996, 1997, 2002, 2003, 2004, 2005, 2006
Serbian League	Winners	9^{s}	2007, 2008, 2009, 2010, 2011, 2012, 2013, 2014, 2025
Cups – 16 (record)
Yugoslav Cup	Winners	3	1979, 1989, 1992
FR Yugoslavia Cup	Winners	5	1994, 1995, 1999, 2000, 2002
Radivoj Korać Cup	Winners	8	2008, 2009, 2010, 2011, 2012, 2018, 2019, 2020
European – 4
EuroLeague	Winners	1	1992
FIBA Korać Cup	Winners	3	1978, 1979, 1989
Regional – 9 (record)
ABA League	Winners	8	2007, 2008, 2009, 2010, 2011, 2013, 2023, 2025
ABA League Supercup	Winners	1^{s}	2019
Individual club awards – 1
Triple Crown	Winners	1	1991–92

Record

^{S} Shared record

=== Regional competitions ===
- ABA League

Winners (8): 2006–07, 2007–08, 2008–09, 2009–10, 2010–11, 2012–13, 2022–23, 2024–25
Runners-up (5): 2004–05, 2005–06, 2021–22, 2023–24, 2025–26

- ABA League Supercup

Winners (1): 2019
Runners-up (1): 2023

=== European competitions ===
- EuroLeague

Winners (1): 1991–92
Semifinalists (1): 1979–80
Third place (2): 1981–82, 1987–88
Fourth place (2): 1997–98, 2009–10
Final Four (4): 1988, 1992, 1998, 2010

- FIBA Korać Cup (defunct)

Winners (3): 1977–78, 1978–79, 1988–89
Runners-up (1): 1973–74
Semifinalists (1): 1974–75

=== Unofficial awards ===
- Triple Crown

Winners (1): 1991–92

- Small Triple Crown

Winners (1): 1978–79

=== Other competitions ===
- Mirza Delibašić Memorial

Winners (1): 2006

- FIBA Christmas Tournament (defunct)

Third place (2): 1998, 1999
Fourth place (1): 1980

== Season by season ==
Season	Tier	League	Pos.	ABA League	Domestic cup	European competitions		Other cups	
1986–87	1	FFBL	1st	—N/a	Semifinalist	3 FIBA Korać Cup	R16	—N/a	—N/a
1987–88	1	FFBL	2nd	—N/a	Semifinalist	1 European Champions Cup	3rd	—N/a	—N/a
1988–89	1	FFBL	2nd	—N/a	Champions	3 FIBA Korać Cup	C	—N/a	—N/a
1989–90	1	FFBL	8th	—N/a	Quarterfinalist	2 European Cup Winners' Cup	QF	Yugoslavia Super Cup	RU
1990–91	1	FFBL	2nd	—N/a	Quarterfinalist	—N/a	—N/a	—N/a	—N/a
1991–92	1	FFBL	1st	—N/a	Champions	1 FIBA European League	C	—N/a	—N/a
1992–93	1	YUBA	2nd	—N/a	Runner-up	1 FIBA European League	UN	—N/a	—N/a
1993–94	1	YUBA	2nd	—N/a	Champions	—N/a	—N/a	—N/a	—N/a
1994–95	1	YUBA	1st	—N/a	Champions	—N/a	—N/a	—N/a	—N/a
1995–96	1	YUBA	1st	—N/a	Runner-up	1 FIBA European League	R2	—N/a	—N/a
1995–96	1	YUBA	1st	—N/a	Runner-up	2 FIBA European Cup	QFGS	—N/a	—N/a
1996–97	1	YUBA	1st	—N/a	Runner-up	1 FIBA EuroLeague	T16	—N/a	—N/a
1997–98	1	YUBA	3rd	—N/a	Semifinalist	1 FIBA EuroLeague	4th	—N/a	—N/a
1998–99	1	YUBA	3rd	—N/a	Champions	2 FIBA Saporta Cup	QF	Christmas Tournament	3rd
1999–00	1	YUBA	2nd	—N/a	Champions	2 FIBA Saporta Cup	RS	Christmas Tournament	3rd
2000–01	1	YUBA	2nd	—N/a	Runner-up	1 FIBA SuproLeague	R16	—N/a	—N/a
2001–02	1	YUBA	1st	—N/a	Champions	1 EuroLeague	RS	—N/a	—N/a
2002–03	1	YUBA	1st	—N/a	Semifinalist	1 EuroLeague	RS	—N/a	—N/a
2003–04	1	YUBA	1st	—N/a	Quarterfinalist	1 EuroLeague	RS	—N/a	—N/a
2004–05	1	YUBA	1st	Runner-up	Runner-up	1 EuroLeague	RS	—N/a	—N/a
2005–06	1	YUBA	1st	Runner-up	Semifinalist	1 EuroLeague	RS	—N/a	—N/a
2006–07	1	KLS	1st	Champions	Runner-up	1 EuroLeague	T16	—N/a	—N/a
2007–08	1	KLS	1st	Champions	Champions	1 EuroLeague	QF	—N/a	—N/a
2008–09	1	KLS	1st	Champions	Champions	1 EuroLeague	QF	—N/a	—N/a
2009–10	1	KLS	1st	Champions	Champions	1 EuroLeague	4th	—N/a	—N/a
2010–11	1	KLS	1st	Champions	Champions	1 EuroLeague	T16	Gomelsky Cup	4th
2011–12	1	KLS	1st	Semifinalist	Champions	1 Euroleague	RS	—N/a	—N/a
2012–13	1	KLS	1st	Champions	Runner-up	1 EuroLeague	RS	—N/a	—N/a
2013–14	1	KLS	1st	Semifinalist	Quarterfinalist	1 EuroLeague	T16	—N/a	—N/a
2014–15	1	KLS	2nd	Semifinalist	Semifinalist	2 Eurocup	RS	—N/a	—N/a
2015–16	1	KLS	2nd	5th	Runner-up	—N/a	—N/a	—N/a	—N/a
2016–17	1	KLS	SF	Semifinalist	Runner-up	3 Champions League	PO	—N/a	—N/a
2017–18	1	KLS	SF	5th	Champion	2 EuroCup	RS	ABA Supercup	6th
2018–19	1	KLS	2nd	Semifinalist	Champion	2 EuroCup	T16	ABA Supercup	SF
2019–20	1	KLS	CX	(Cancelled)	Champion	2 EuroCup	QF (CX)	ABA Supercup	C
2020–21	1	KLS	SF	7th	Semifinalist	2 EuroCup	T16	ABA Supercup	CX
2021–22	1	KLS	DNP	Runner-up	Runner-up	2 EuroCup	R16	—N/a	—N/a
2022–23	1	KLS	DQ	Champions	Semifinalist	1 EuroLeague	QF	VTB Supercup	4th
2023–24	1	KLS	2nd	Runner-up	Runner-up	1 EuroLeague	11th	ABA Supercup	RU
2024–25	1	KLS	1st	Champions	Runner-up	1 EuroLeague	12th	—N/a	—N/a
2025–26	1	KLS	SF	Runner-up	Semifinalist	1 EuroLeague	15th	—N/a	—N/a

== Matches against NBA teams ==
Partizan is the first and so far only club from Serbia that played games against NBA teams. On the 2009 EuroLeague American Tour, Partizan played against Denver Nuggets and Phoenix Suns.

3 October 2009

Boxscore

Denver Nuggets (United States)	102–70	(Serbia) Partizan

(United States) Pepsi Center, Denver

6 October 2009

Boxscore

Phoenix Suns (United States)	111–80	(Serbia) Partizan Belgrade

(United States) US Airways Center, Phoenix

== Management ==
Current staff
- President: (Serbia) Ostoja Mijailović
- Vice-president: (Serbia) Dejan Čakajac
- Vice-president: (Serbia) Nenad Kovač
- Club director: (Serbia) Dule Karavesović
- Executive director: (Serbia) Mlađan Šilobad
- Sporting director: (Serbia) Žarko Paspalj
- Financial director: (Serbia) Maja Jakovljević
- Markenting director: (Serbia) Marko Vukomanović
- PR manager: (Serbia) Ivan Ivković
- Team manager: (Serbia) Aleksandar Mitrović
- Econom: (Serbia) Nikola Tomašević

== Sponsorships ==
Official Shirt Sponsor	NIS
Official Shirt Sponsor	mt:s
Official Shirt Sponsor	Addiko Bank
Official Sport Clothing Manufacturer	Nike
Official Sport Drink	Aqua Viva
Official Broadcaster	Arena Sport Serbia
Official Travel Provider	Air Serbia

== See also ==
- List of basketball clubs in Serbia by major honours won
- KK Partizan in Europe (EuroLeague)
- Crvena Zvezda–Partizan basketball rivalry
