= Milenko Savović =

Serbian basketball player (1960–2021)

Personal information
- Born: July 18, 1960 Trebinje, PR Bosnia-Herzegovina, FPR Yugoslavia
- Died: 1 March 2021 (aged 60) Belgrade, Serbia
- Listed height: 6 ft 10.5 in (2.10 m)

Career information
- NBA draft: 1982: undrafted
- Playing career: 1977–1991
- Position: Center

Career history
- 1977–1989: Partizan
- 1989–1990: Oximesa
- 1990–1991: Vojvodina

Career highlights
- 3× Yugoslav Basketball League (1979, 1981, 1987); 2× Yugoslav Basketball Cup (1979, 1989); 3× FIBA Korać Cup (1978, 1979, 1989)
Medals
Men's basketball
Representing Yugoslavia
European Championship for Cadets
Silver medal – second place	1977 France	Team

Milenko Savović (18 July 1960 – 1 March 2021) was a Serbian professional basketball player. For most of his career, he was the captain of KK Partizan.

Savović died from COVID-19 during the COVID-19 pandemic in Serbia.

== Career ==
During his playing career, Savović spent 12 seasons with KK Partizan.

== Honours ==
- Yugoslav Basketball League: 1979, 1981, 1987
- Yugoslav Basketball Cup: 1979, 1989
- FIBA Korać Cup: 1978, 1979, 1989
