= Miodrag Marić =

Serbian basketball player

Personal information
- Born: 17 February 1957 (age 69) Titovo Užice, PR Serbia, FPR Yugoslavia
- Listed height: 2.06 m (6 ft 9 in)

Career information
- Playing career: 1974–1993
- Position: Center
- Number: 11

Career history
- 1974–1986: Partizan
- 1989–1991: Vojvodina
- 1991–1992: Rabotnički
- 1992–1993: CSKA Sofia

Career highlights
- 3× Yugoslav League champion (1976, 1979, 1981); Yugoslav Cup champion (1979); 2× Korać Cup winner (1978, 1979)

Miodrag "Miško" Marić (Serbian Cyrillic: Миодраг Марић; born 17 February 1957), is a Serbian former basketball player. He played for Partizan from 1974 to 1986 and remains the third scorer in the club's history with 4,668 points.
