= Dragan Todorić =

Former basketball player and sports worker

Partizan NIS Belgrade
- Title: Adviser to the club president
- League: Basketball League of Serbia; ABA League

Personal information
- Born: 27 July 1954 (age 72) Kraljevo, PR Serbia, FPR Yugoslavia

Career information
- NBA draft: 1976: undrafted
- Playing career: 1967–1985
- Position: Point guard

Career history
- 1967–1972: Sloga
- 1972–1983: Partizan
- 1983–1984: OKK Beograd
- 1984–1985: Sloga

Dragan Todorić (Serbian: Драган Тодорић; born 27 July 1954) is a Serbian former professional basketball player and current adviser to the President of Partizan Belgrade. He is known for a rare achievement: taking part—either as a player or subsequently as part of the club management—in each one of the 50 trophies KK Partizan won throughout its history.

== Club playing career ==
In 1967, Todorić started his playing career in Sloga from his hometown Kraljevo. While competing for young Yugoslav national team he drew attention from several Yugoslav top clubs, including Partizan fierce rivals, Crvena zvezda. Eventually, he chose to sign for Partizan in 1972, and remained in the first team until 1983. During this period he played 363 official games, which puts him at 6th place of Partizan hall of fame list by number of played games. Before finishing his career in 1985, he played for OKK Belgrade (known as OKK Beko at the time) and again for Sloga. As Partizan player he won three state championships (in 1976, 1979 and 1981) one Yugoslav Cup (1979) and two Korać Cups (1978 and 1979).

== National team career ==
Todorić represented Yugoslavia at the cadet, junior, and senior (full squad) level.

At age 15, just before his 16th birthday, he was part of the team that won gold at the 1971 European Championship for Cadets in Gorizia, Italy, playing alongside future legends Dragan Kićanović, Mirza Delibašić and Rajko Žižić. He was also on the squad that won gold at the 1972 European Championship for Juniors in Zadar.

On senior level, Todorić was overshadowed by famous point guard Zoran Slavnić; however, he still got to win gold medal at the 1975 Mediterranean Games in Algeria, and another gold medal on Balkan Championship in Romania, the same year.

== Post-playing career ==
Starting in 1982, while still an active player with Partizan, Todorić got a position at the club's marketing department. He has been at the club ever since in various coaching and administrative roles — assistant coach, secretary, general secretary, and director. Currently, he is Partizan's sporting director as well as a member of its board of directors.

== Titles ==
Partizan

- Korać Cup: 1977-78, 1978–79
- Yugoslav Championship: 1975–76, 1978–79, 1980–81
- Yugoslav Cup: 1979
