= Dušan Kerkez (basketball) =

Serbian basketball player

Personal information
- Born: July 20, 1952 (age 72); Vršac, PR Serbia, FPR Yugoslavia

Career information
- Playing career: 1968–1985

Career history
- 1968–1971: INEX Brixol
- 1971–1983: Partizan
- 1983–1985: IMT

Dušan Kerkez (born July 20, 1952) is a former Serbian professional basketball player.
