= Dražen Dalipagić =

Serbian basketball player (1951–2025)

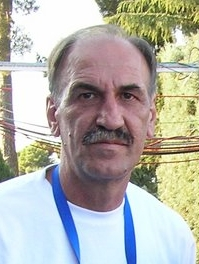
- Dalipagić in 2007

Personal information
- Born: 27 November 1951 Mostar, PR Bosnia and Herzegovina, FPR Yugoslavia
- Died: 25 January 2025 (aged 73) Belgrade, Serbia
- Listed height: 197 cm (6 ft 6 in)
- Listed weight: 107 kg (236 lb)

Career information
- Playing career: 1971–1991
- Position: Small forward
- Number: 14, 15
- Coaching career: 1992–2001

Career history

Playing
- 1971–1980: Partizan
- 1980–1981: Carrera Venezia
- 1981–1982: Partizan
- 1982–1983: Real Madrid
- 1983–1985: A.P.U. Udine
- 1985–1988: Reyer Venezia
- 1988–1989: Glaxo Verona
- 1990–1991: Crvena zvezda

Coaching
- 1992–1996: Nuova Pallacanestro Gorizia
- 1998–1999: MZT Skopje
- 2000–2001: Astra Banka

Career highlights
- 4× FIBA European Selection (1978, 1981 2×, 1982); Yugoslav League champion (1976); FIBA Korać Cup champion (1978); 2× FIBA Korać Cup Finals Top Scorer (1974, 1978); Italian League Top Scorer (1988); FIBA EuroBasket MVP (1977); FIBA World Cup MVP (1978); FIBA World Cup Top Scorer (1978); The Best Athlete of Yugoslavia (1978); Yugoslav Sportsman of the Year (1978); 2× Mister Europa Player of the Year (1977, 1978); Euroscar Player of the Year (1980); FIBA's 50 Greatest Players (1991); 50 Greatest EuroLeague Contributors (2008)
- Basketball Hall of Fame
- FIBA Hall of Fame
Medals
Men's basketball
Representing Yugoslavia
Olympic Games
Gold medal – first place	1980 Moscow
Silver medal – second place	1976 Montreal
Bronze medal – third place	1984 Los Angeles
FIBA World Cup
Gold medal – first place	1978 Philippines
Silver medal – second place	1974 Puerto Rico
Bronze medal – third place	1982 Colombia
Bronze medal – third place	1986 Spain
FIBA Eurobasket
Gold medal – first place	1973 Spain
Gold medal – first place	1975 Yugoslavia
Gold medal – first place	1977 Belgium
Silver medal – second place	1981 Czechoslovakia
Bronze medal – third place	1979 Italy
Mediterranean Games
Gold medal – first place	1975 Algiers

Dražen "Praja" Dalipagić (Serbian Cyrillic: Дражен "Праја" Далипагић; 27 November 1951 – 25 January 2025) was a Serbian professional basketball player and head coach. He was selected the best athlete of Yugoslavia in the year 1978, and is one of the most decorated athletes in Yugoslavian history. He was named one of FIBA's 50 Greatest Players in 1991. Dalipagić was enshrined into the Naismith Memorial Basketball Hall of Fame as a player in 2004, and into the FIBA Hall of Fame, also as a player, in 2007. In 2008, he was named one of the 50 Greatest EuroLeague Contributors. Playing for Partizan, Dalipagić won two Yugoslav league titles, a Yugoslav Cup, and two Korać Cups. He is the club's all-time leading scorer with 8,278 points. In 243 appearances with the Yugoslavia national team (second most) between 1973 and 1986, Dalipagić won 12 medals (second most) including gold medals at the Olympics (1980), World Cup (1978), and EuroBasket (1973, 1975, 1977).

During his professional playing career, he scored at least 50 points in a game 15 times. His single-game career scoring high was 70 points scored, achieved during an Italian League game, between Venezia and Virtus Bologna, on 25 January 1987. He was nicknamed "The Sky Jumper".

== Professional career ==
Dalipagić started playing basketball at the age of 19, and one year later he signed his first professional contract with Partizan, in 1971. He stayed with Partizan for eight seasons, until 1980. Over that time, he won the Mr. Europa European Player of the Year award twice, in 1977 and 1978, and the European Player of the Year Euroscar award in 1980. He was declared the best athlete of Yugoslavia in 1978. In the 1975–76 season, he led Partizan to the Yugoslav League title, and also to the European-wide 3rd-tier level FIBA Korać Cup title, in the 1977–78 season. He was also a member of Partizan, at the time when they won the 1978–79 season Korać Cup title, but he was serving in the Yugoslav army at the time.

In the 1980–81 season, he went abroad for the first time in his career. During that season, he played with Reyer Venezia, of the Italian Lega Basket Serie A league. After just one season with Venezia, he returned to his former club, Partizan, for one season. In the following seasons, he played for numerous European teams, including Real Madrid, of the Spanish Primera División, during the 1982–83 season, in which he only played with the club in FIBA European Champions Cup (now called EuroLeague) games. He also played with Reyer Venezia, and Glaxo Verona of the Italian League. He finished his professional career after the 1990–91 season, in which he played with Partizan's arch-rivals, Crvena zvezda.

As a Partizan Belgrade player, he scored 8,278 points, in 305 games played, for a scoring average of 27.1 points per game. While playing in Italy, he scored 7,993 points in 241 games played, for a scoring average of 33.2 points per game. He led the Italian League in scoring average, in the 1987–88 season, with an average of 37.7 points per game.

== National team career ==
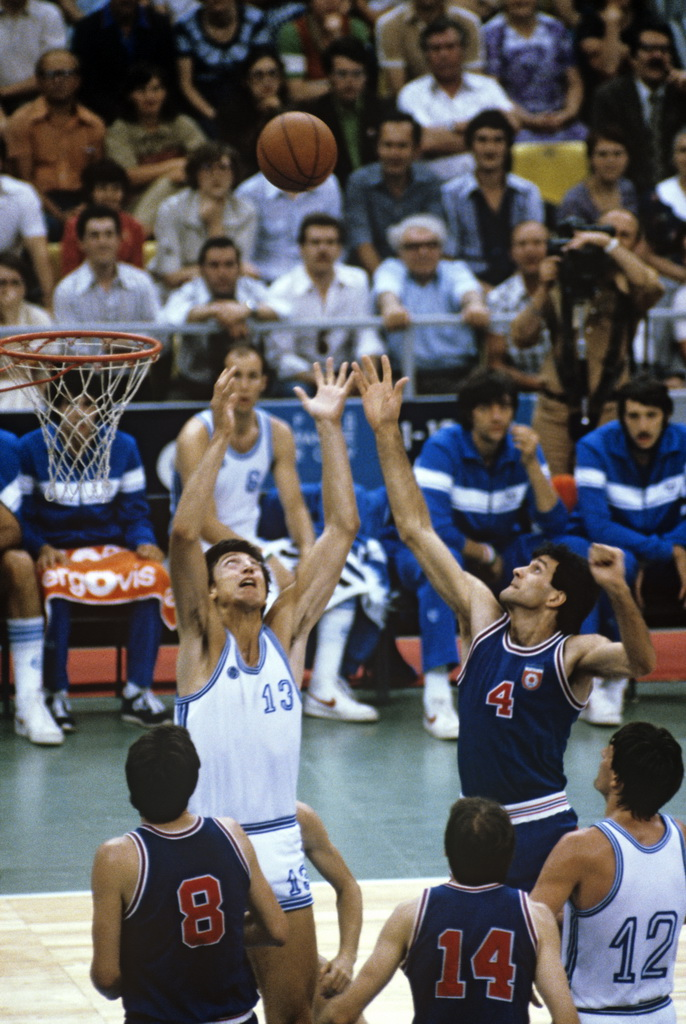
Dalipagić (#14) and Željko Jerkov (#8) watch Andro Knego and Renzo Vecchiato go up for a rebound, in Yugoslavia's 102–81 blowout win against Italy, at the 1980 Olympics.

Dalipagić debuted for senior the Yugoslavian national basketball team, in 1973. In total, he played in 243 games with Yugoslavia's senior national team, between 1973 and 1986, scoring a total of 3,700 points, which was the most points scored by any player in the history of the Yugoslav national team.

He won the gold medal at the 1978 FIBA World Championship, and the gold medal at the 1980 Summer Olympics. As a member of the Yugoslavian national team, he also won three gold medals at the EuroBasket. His four medals won at the FIBA World Cup (Silver, 1974 FIBA World Championship; Gold, 1978 FIBA World Championship; Bronze, 1982 FIBA World Championship, and 1986 FIBA World Championship) is tied for the all-time international basketball record. A three-time Olympian, Dalipagić was instrumental in the Yugoslavian team's capturing of the gold, at the 1980 Summer Olympics.

== Personal life and death ==
Dalipagić finished high school at the Technical School in Mostar and graduated from the Teachers College in Belgrade. He was married to Sonja Požeg, former Yugoslav tennis player. They had two children, Sanja and Davorin.

Dalipagić died on 25 January 2025, at the age of 73.

== See also ==
- Yugoslav First Federal Basketball League career stats leaders
- List of flag bearers for Yugoslavia at the Olympics

Awards
Preceded by Šaban Sejdi	The Best Athlete of Yugoslavia; 1978	Succeeded by Miodrag Perunović
Preceded by Šaban Sejdi	Yugoslav Sportsman of the Year; 1978	Succeeded by Bojan Križaj
Olympic Games
Preceded by Matija Ljubek	Flagbearer for Yugoslavia; Los Angeles 1984	Succeeded by Matija Ljubek
