= Dragan Kićanović =

Serbian basketball player

- Драган Кићановић

President of the Olympic Committee of Serbia and Montenegro (OKSCG)
- In office 1996–2005
- Preceded by: Aleksandar Bakočević
- Succeeded by: Philip Zepter

Minister of Youth and Sports
- In office 31 July 1991 – 24 September 1992
- Prime Minister: Dragutin Zelenović; Radoman Božović
- Preceded by: Goran Trivan
- Succeeded by: Vladimir Cvetković

Personal details
- Born: 17 August 1953 (age 73) Čačak, PR Serbia, FPR Yugoslavia
- Party: Socialist Party of Serbia (SPS)
- Occupation: Basketball player; cabinet minister; sports administrator; diplomat; businessman
- Basketball career

Personal information
- Listed height: 192 cm (6 ft 4 in)
- Listed weight: 87 kg (192 lb)

Career information
- Playing career: 1971–1984
- Position: Shooting guard
- Number: 5

Career history
- 1971–1972: Borac Čačak
- 1972–1981: Partizan
- 1981–1983: Scavolini Pesaro
- 1983–1984: Paris Basket Racing

Career highlights
- Best Basketball Player of Yugoslavia in the 20th Century; FIBA World Cup MVP (1974); FIBA World Cup Top Scorer (1982); 2× Mr. Europa (1981, 1982); 2× Euroscar (1981, 1982); Best Athlete of Yugoslavia (1982); FIBA's 50 Greatest Players (1991); 3× FIBA European Selection (1976, 1978, 1981); FIBA Saporta Cup champion (1983); FIBA Saporta Cup Finals Top Scorer (1983); 2× FIBA Korać Cup champion (1978, 1979); FIBA Korać Cup Finals Top Scorer (1979); 3× Yugoslav League champion (1976, 1979, 1981); Yugoslav Cup winner (1979)
- FIBA Hall of Fame
Medals
Men's basketball
Representing Yugoslavia
Summer Olympic Games
Gold medal – first place	1980 Moscow
Silver medal – second place	1976 Montreal
World Cup
Bronze medal – third place	1982 Colombia
Gold medal – first place	1978 Philippines
Silver medal – second place	1974 Puerto Rico
EuroBasket
Silver medal – second place	1981 Czechoslovakia
Bronze medal – third place	1979 Italy
Gold medal – first place	1977 Belgium
Gold medal – first place	1975 Yugoslavia
Gold medal – first place	1973 Spain
Mediterranean Games
Gold medal – first place	1975 Algiers
Gold medal – first place	1971 İzmir
European Championship for Juniors
Gold medal – first place	1972 Yugoslavia	Under-18
European Championship for Cadets
Gold medal – first place	1971 Italy	Under-16

Dragan Kićanović (Serbian: Драган Кићановић; born 17 August 1953) is a Serbian and Yugoslav retired professional basketball player.

A 1.92 m (6 ft 3 1/2 in) tall shooting guard, Kićanović played in the 1970s and 1980s, and is considered to be one of the best European players and scorers of all time, having won both the Mr. Europa and the Euroscar European Player of the Year awards in 1981 and 1982. He was named one of FIBA's 50 Greatest Players in 1991. On 20 August 2010, Kićanović became a FIBA Hall of Fame player, in recognition of his play in international competitions. He was named the Best athlete of Yugoslavia in 1982, and he was also named the Best Basketball Player of Yugoslavia in the 20th century.

Since September 2013, he's been performing the role of consul general at the Serbian consulate in Trieste.

== Club career ==
During the 1970s, Kićanović played club basketball alongside Dražen Dalipagić, and together they created an accomplished duo as members of Partizan Belgrade. In international club competition, Kićanović won two consecutive European-wide 3rd-tier level FIBA Korać Cup championships, with Partizan Belgrade (1977–78 and 1978–79). He scored 33 points in the 1977–78 Finals (behind only Dalipagić's 48 points), and 41 points in the 1978–79 Finals.

Furthermore, he also won a European-wide 2nd-tier level FIBA European Cup Winners' Cup (FIBA Saporta Cup) title with Scavolini Pesaro, in the 1982–83 season. In which, he again dominated in the competition's final, as he scored 31 points and handed out eight assists. With Partizan Belgrade, Kićanović also won three Yugoslavian First Federal League championships (1976, 1979, and 1981), and a Yugoslavian Cup title in 1979. He was a three-time member of the FIBA European Selection Team (1976, 1978, and 1981).

== National team career ==
Kićanović played with the senior Yugoslavian national basketball team from 1973 to 1983, and he competed at all the major international FIBA competitions: the FIBA EuroBasket, the FIBA World Cup and the Summer Olympic Games. He won the FIBA EuroBasket three times (1973, 1975, and 1977). He was twice named to the EuroBasket All-Tournament Team (1979 and 1981).

At the Summer Olympic Games, Kićanović won the silver medal at the 1976 Summer Olympic Games and the gold medal at the 1980 Summer Olympic Games. At the FIBA World Cup, he won the silver medal at the 1974 FIBA World Championship, and he was selected as the Most Valuable Player of the tournament. He also won the gold medal at the 1978 FIBA World Championship, and the bronze medal at the 1982 FIBA World Championship. He was the top scorer in total points scored, of the 1982 World Championship, as he scored a total of 190 points. He was also named to the All-Tournament Teams of both the 1978 and 1982 tournaments. He is one of the leading scorers of all time, in the history of the FIBA World Cup, having scored a total of 491 points at the tournament.

== Administrative career ==
=== KK Partizan ===
Shortly after retiring from playing basketball, Kićanović was named vice-president at Partizan Belgrade, under the club presidency of Tomislav Jeremić. With the division of tasks, Jeremić was mostly involved on the business end, while Kićanović ran the squad, making decisions on everything from player personnel to coaching acquisitions. He immediately brought in Zoran Slavnić—his former teammate from the Yugoslav national team where the two were part of the famous one-two back-court guard duo—as the club's new head coach.

== See also ==
- Yugoslav First Federal Basketball League career stats leaders

Government offices
Preceded by Goran Trivan	Minister of Youth and Sports of Serbia; 1991 – 1992	Succeeded by Vladimir Cvetković
Civic offices
Preceded by Aleksandar Bakočević	President of the Olympic Committee of Yugoslavia; 1996 – 2005	Succeeded by Philip Zepter
Awards
Preceded by Borut Petrić	The Best Athlete of Yugoslavia; 1982	Succeeded by Dragutin Šurbek
