= 2026–27 KK Partizan season =

Serbian basketball club season

Partizan Mozzart Bet
2026–27 season
- Roster in October 2026
- President: (Serbia) Ostoja Mijailović
- Head coach: (Spain) Joan Peñarroya
- Arena: Belgrade Arena (EuroLeague); Aleksandar Nikolić Hall & Ranko Žeravica Sports Hall (ABA League)
- ABA League: Schedule
- Serbian SuperLeague: Schedule
- EuroLeague: Schedule
- Serbian Cup: Schedule
Home	Away
- All statistics correct as of 23 July 2026.

In the 2026–27 season, Partizan competes in the Serbian SuperLeague, Radivoj Korać Cup, ABA League and EuroLeague.

== Players ==
=== Current roster ===
Note: Flags indicate national team eligibility at FIBA-sanctioned events. Players may hold other non-FIBA nationalities not displayed.

Partizan Belgrade roster
Players
Coaches

Pos.	No.	Nat.	Name	Ht.	Wt.	Age
G	0	(Montenegro)	Allman Jr., Kyle	1.91 m (6 ft 3 in)	79 kg (174 lb)	29 – 2 September 1997
PG	1	(South Sudan)	Jones, Carlik	1.85 m (6 ft 1 in)	79 kg (174 lb)	28 – 23 December 1997
G	3	(Argentina)	Vildoza, Luca (injured)	1.91 m (6 ft 3 in)	86 kg (190 lb)	31 – 11 August 1995
G/F	5	(Puerto Rico)	Thompson, Ethan (injured)	1.93 m (6 ft 4 in)	88 kg (194 lb)	27 – 4 May 1999
SF	7	(Serbia)	Nakić, Mario	2.02 m (6 ft 8 in)	97 kg (214 lb)	25 – 14 June 2001
PF	8	(United States)	Franks, Robert	2.01 m (6 ft 7 in)	107 kg (236 lb)	29 – 18 December 1996
G/F	9	(Serbia)	Marinković, Vanja (C)	1.99 m (6 ft 6 in)	90 kg (198 lb)	29 – 9 January 1997
F/C	10	(Serbia)	Tanasković, Nikola	2.04 m (6 ft 8 in)	102 kg (225 lb)	29 – 21 October 1997
F	11	(United States)	Stevens, Lamar (injured)	2.01 m (6 ft 7 in)	104 kg (229 lb)	29 – 9 July 1997
G/F	12	(United States)	Reeves, Antonio	1.96 m (6 ft 5 in)	93 kg (205 lb)	26 – 20 November 2000
C	13	(Central African Republic)	Hayes, Kevarrius	2.06 m (6 ft 9 in)	103 kg (227 lb)	29 – 5 March 1997
G/F	19	(Serbia)	Lakić, Arijan	1.98 m (6 ft 6 in)	95 kg (209 lb)	26 – 20 January 2000
C	23	(Nigeria)	Jekiri, Tonye	2.13 m (7 ft 0 in)	118 kg (260 lb)	32 – 23 July 1994
C	30	(Gabon)	Silva, Chris	2.06 m (6 ft 9 in)	106 kg (234 lb)	30 – 19 September 1996
PF	35	(United States)	Willis, Derek	2.06 m (6 ft 9 in)	104 kg (229 lb)	31 – 21 June 1995
G	66	(Italy)	Pajola, Alessandro	1.94 m (6 ft 4 in)	95 kg (209 lb)	27 – 9 November 1999
C	77	(France)	Lauvergne, Joffrey	2.11 m (6 ft 11 in)	118 kg (260 lb)	35 – 30 September 1991

Head coach

- (Spain) Joan Peñarroya

Assistant coach(es)

- (Serbia) Mirko Ocokoljić
- (Serbia) Aleksandar Matović
- (Serbia) Oliver Stević
- (Serbia) Luka Milinković

Athletic trainer(s)

- (Serbia) Predrag Zimonjić

Team manager

- (Serbia) Aleksandar Mitrović

Legend

- (C) Team captain
- (IN) Inactive
- Injured

- Roster
- Transactions
Updated: November 13, 2026

=== Players with multiple nationalities ===
- (United States) (Montenegro) Kyle Allman Jr.
- (United States) (South Sudan) Carlik Jones
- (Argentina) (Italy) Luca Vildoza
- (Serbia) (Croatia) Mario Nakić
- (United States) (Central African Republic) Kevarrius Hayes
- (France) (Serbia) Joffrey Lauvergne

=== Depth chart ===
Pos.	Starting 5	Bench 1	Bench 2	Bench 3	Inactive
C	Chris Silva	Tonye Jekiri	Joffrey Lauvergne	Kevarrius Hayes
PF	Robert Franks	Derek Willis	Nikola Tanasković
SF	Arijan Lakić	Mario Nakić		Vanja Marinković	Lamar Stevens (injured)
SG	Antonio Reeves	Kyle Allman Jr.			Ethan Thompson (injured)
PG	Alessandro Pajola	Carlik Jones			Luca Vildoza (injured)

=== On loan ===
Players out on loan
Nat.	Player	Position	Team	On loan since
(Romania)	Luca Illeș	PG	(Romania) U-BT Cluj-Napoca	August 2026
(Serbia)	Luka Pavlović	PG	(Serbia) Metalac Valjevo (Two-way affiliate)	August 2026
(Serbia)	Uroš Mijailović	SG	(Serbia) Metalac Valjevo (Two-way affiliate)	August 2026
(Serbia)	Đorđe Šekularac	GF	(Serbia) Metalac Valjevo (Two-way affiliate)	August 2026
(Serbia)	Uroš Danilović	SF	(Serbia) Metalac Valjevo (Two-way affiliate)	August 2026
(Serbia)	Uroš Dramićanin	F	(Serbia) Metalac Valjevo (Two-way affiliate)	August 2026
(Serbia)	Nikola Đurović	FC	(Serbia) Metalac Valjevo (Two-way affiliate)	August 2026
(Serbia)	Luka Miladinović	C	(Serbia) Metalac Valjevo (Two-way affiliate)	August 2026

=== Roster changes ===
==== In ====
No.	Pos.	Nat.	Name	Moving from		Type	Date	Source
13	C	(Central African Republic)	Kevarrius Hayes	AS Monaco	(Monaco)	Transfer	19 July 2026	
11	F	(United States)	Lamar Stevens	Paris Basketball	(France)	End of contract	22 July 2026	
66	G	(Italy)	Alessandro Pajola	Virtus Bologna	(Italy)	End of contract	23 July 2026	
10	F/C	(Serbia)	Nikola Tanasković	Budućnost	(Montenegro)	End of contract	25 July 2026	
3	G	(Argentina)	Luca Vildoza	Virtus Bologna	(Italy)	Parted ways	26 July 2026	
35	PF	(United States)	Derek Willis	Paris Basketball	(France)	End of contract	28 July 2026	
0	G	(Montenegro)	Kyle Allman Jr.	Türk Telekom	(Turkey)	End of contract	31 July 2026	
5	G/F	(Puerto Rico)	Ethan Thompson	Indiana Pacers	(United States)	Parted ways	16 August 2026	
95	PF	(France)	Bandja Sy	CSM Oradea	(Romania)	End of contract	28 September 2026	
12	G/F	(United States)	Antonio Reeves	Charlotte Hornets	(United States)	End of contract	21 October 2026	
8	PF	(United States)	Robert Franks	Nanjing Monkey Kings	(China)	Parted ways	23 October 2026	
30	C	(Gabon)	Chris Silva	Fenerbahçe	(Turkey)	Parted ways	13 November 2026	

==== Out ====
No.	Pos.	Nat.	Name	Moving to		Type	Date	Source
3	PF	(Finland)	Miikka Muurinen	Arkansas Razorbacks	(United States)	Transfer	12 June 2026	
4	PG	(Germany) (United States)	Duane Washington Jr.	Bayern Munich	(Germany)	End of contract	12 June 2026	
33	PG	(Greece)	Nick Calathes	PAOK Thessaloniki	(Greece)	End of contract	17 June 2026	
12	G/F	(United States)	Sterling Brown	Žalgiris Kaunas	(Lithuania)	Transfer	22 June 2026	
5	F/C	(Germany)	Dylan Osetkowski	Valencia Basket	(Spain)	Parted ways	2 July 2026	
17	F	(Germany)	Isaac Bonga	Panathinaikos	(Greece)	Transfer	4 July 2026	
13	SF	(Serbia)	Aleksa Radanov	Free agent		End of contract	6 July 2026	
2	G	(United States)	Shake Milton	Hapoel Jerusalem	(Israel)	Parted ways	9 July 2026	
24	C	(Angola)	Bruno Fernando	Anadolu Efes	(Turkey)	Transfer	10 July 2026	
11	F/C	(Serbia)	Aleksej Pokuševski	Lokomotiv Kuban	(Russia)	End of contract	21 July 2026	
8	SF	(Serbia)	Mitar Bošnjaković	Free agent		Parted ways	16 August 2026	
22	PF	(United States)	Jabari Parker	Free agent		Parted ways	23 October 2026	
95	PF	(France)	Bandja Sy	Lietkabelis Panevėžys	(Lithuania)	End of contract	30 October 2026	

== Pre-season and friendlies ==
Win Loss

31 August 2026	Partizan (Serbia)	83–71	(Russia) Zenit Saint Petersburg	Belgrade
19:00	Scoring by quarter: 30–15, 12–22, 24–19, 17–15
	Pts: Stevens 16; Rebs: Stevens 8 Asts: Vildoza 8 PIR: Stevens 23	Boxscore	Pts: Zemskiy 14; Rebs: Poythress 10; Asts: Karasev 5 PIR: Poythress 18	Arena: Small Hall Belgrade arena

5 September 2026	Partizan (Serbia)	83–94	(Israel) Hapoel Tel Aviv	Belgrade
19:00	Scoring by quarter: 19–15, 21–26, 24–23, 19–30
	Pts: Vildoza 12; Rebs: Lauvergne 7 Asts: Pajola 5 PIR: Vildoza 13	Boxscore	Pts: Bryant 14; Rebs: Bryant, Oturu 7 Asts: Micić 8 PIR: Bryant 22	Arena: Small Hall Belgrade arena

11 September 2026	Partizan (Serbia)	98–55	(Spain) Partizan Fuenlabrada	Belgrade
20:00	Scoring by quarter: 26–9, 25–10, 26–22, 21–14
Arena Sport	Pts: Willis 16; Rebs: Tanasković 7 Asts: Allman Jr. 7 PIR: Lauvergne 22	Boxscore	Pts: Cruz 13; Rebs: Cruz 7 Asts: four players 3 PIR: Cruz 14	Arena: Aleksandar Nikolić Hall; Attendance: 3,000; Referees: Uroš Obrknežević, Nikola Miloradović, Stevan Gudžulić

13 September 2026	Partizan (Serbia)	89–71	(Turkey) Beşiktaş	Belgrade
18:00	Scoring by quarter: 15–16, 28–22, 23–17, 23–16
Arena Sport	Pts: Jones 22; Rebs: Stevens 7 Asts: Pajola 6 PIR: Jones 27	Boxscore	Pts: Wilbekin 18; Rebs: Morgan 9 Asts: Brown, Omoruyi, Morgan 3 PIR: Wilbekin, Nowell 15	Arena: Kalemegdan Park; Attendance: 2,000

18 September 2026	PAOK Thessaloniki (Greece)	100–99	(Serbia) Partizan	Athens
16:30	Scoring by quarter: 26–30, 26–24, 27–20, 21–25
Arena Sport	Pts: Osman 27; Rebs: Osman, Foster 6 Asts: Hudgins 5 PIR: Osman 37	Boxscore	Pts: Hayes 18; Rebs: Tanasković 5 Asts: Vildoza 6 PIR: Tanasković 23	Arena: Telekom Center Athens; Referees: Borys Ryzhyk, Saulius Racys, Can Mavisu

19 September 2026	Partizan (Serbia)	101–77	(France) Cosea JL Bourg	Athens
16:00	Scoring by quarter: 20–17, 29–28, 33–13, 19–19
Arena Sport	Pts: Vildoza 18; Rebs: Tanasković 7 Asts: Pajola 6 PIR: Vildoza 24	Boxscore	Pts: Gaudoux 16; Rebs: Samuel 4 Asts: Woodbury 5 PIR: Gaudoux 16	Arena: Telekom Center Athens; Referees: Oļegs Latiševs, Kerem Baki, Can Mavisu

== Competitions ==
=== Overall ===
Competition	Started round	Final position / round	First match	Last match
ABA League	Matchday 1		5 October 2026	2027
Serbian SuperLeague	—		2027	2027
EuroLeague	Matchday 1		25 September 2026	2027
Radivoj Korać Cup	Quarterfinals		February 2027	February 2027

Updated to match played 21 August 2026
Source: Competitions

=== Overview ===
Competition	Record							
Competition	Pld	W	D	L	PF	PA	PD	Win %
ABA League	7	6	0	1	616	539	+77	85.71
Serbian SuperLeague	0	0	0	0	0	0	+0	—
EuroLeague	13	7	0	6	1,029	1,018	+11	53.85
Radivoj Korać Cup	0	0	0	0	0	0	+0	—
Total	20	13	0	7	1,645	1,557	+88	65.00

Last updated: 21 November 2026
Source: Competitions

== ABA League ==
=== Regular season ===
==== Group B ====
Pos	Team	Pld	W	L	PF	PA	PD	Pts	Qualification or relegation
1	(Basketball Federation of Serbia) Partizan Mozzart Bet	4	4	0	353	301	+52	8	Advance to Top 8
2	(United Arab Emirates Basketball Association) Dubai Basketball	4	4	0	378	328	+50	8	Advance to Top 8
3	(Croatian Basketball Federation) Zadar	4	2	2	319	301	+18	6	Advance to Top 8
4	(Romanian Basketball Federation) U-BT Cluj-Napoca	4	2	2	355	343	+12	6	Advance to Top 8
5	(Basketball Federation of Bosnia and Herzegovina) Bosna BH Telecom	4	2	2	362	352	+10	6	Advance to Playout

Updated to match(es) played on 25 October. Source: ABA League

==== Matches ====
Win Loss

TBA* 1	Partizan (Serbia)	vs.	(Slovenia) Perspektiva Ilirija	Belgrade
Arena Sport		Boxscore		Arena: Aleksandar Nikolić Hall

5 October 2026 2	Partizan (Serbia)	83–59	(Serbia) Mega Superbet	Belgrade
18:30	Scoring by quarter: 22–18, 20–15, 21–12, 20–14
Arena Sport	Pts: Thompson 21; Rebs: Hayes 8 Asts: Pajola, Jones 5 PIR: Thompson 21	Boxscore	Pts: Lučić 14; Rebs: Vojinović 7 Asts: five players 1 PIR: Vojinović 13	Arena: Aleksandar Nikolić Hall; Attendance: 0 Referees: Milosav Kaluđerović, Kenan Gušmirović, Jovan Vujović

11 October 2026 3	Partizan (Serbia)	99–78	(Austria) Vienna	Belgrade
20:00	Scoring by quarter: 24–19, 27–19, 24–22, 24–18
Arena Sport	Pts: Sy, Lauvergne, Vildoza 15; Rebs: Vildoza 5 Asts: Pajola 12; PIR: Vildoza 22	Boxscore	Pts: Jovanović 18; Rebs: Langović, Jovanović 6 Asts: Njie, Radovčić 6 PIR: Jovanović 26	Arena: Aleksandar Nikolić Hall; Attendance: 1,413; Referees: Hakan Senkesen, Benis Ćehić, Igor Temelkov

18 October 2026 4	Bosna BH Telecom (Bosnia and Herzegovina)	84–89	(Serbia) Partizan	Sarajevo
14:00	Scoring by quarter: 20–24, 18–15, 18–27, 28–23
Arena Sport	Pts: Perry 21; Rebs: Perry 12; Asts: Talić 7 PIR: Perry 24	Boxscore	Pts: Tanasković 18; Rebs: Tanasković, Hayes 7 Asts: Allman Jr. 5 PIR: Tanasković 27	Arena: Zetra Olympic Hall; Attendance: 3,000; Referees: Milosav Kaluđerović, Bojan Popović, Petar Petrovski

24 October 2026 5	Spartak Office Shoes (Serbia)	80–82	(Serbia) Partizan	Subotica
20:30	Scoring by quarter: 15–23, 24–22, 26–12, 15–25
Arena Sport	Pts: Nikolić 19; Rebs: Omić 6 Asts: Drobnjak 7 PIR: Nikolić 22	Boxscore	Pts: Thompson 23; Rebs: Thompson, Hayes 5 Asts: Allman Jr., Pajola 5 PIR: Thompson 28	Arena: Dudova Šuma Hall; Attendance: 3,200; Referees: Stefan Atomulese, Vojkan Živković, Nikola Domazet

2 November 2026 6	Partizan (Serbia)	97–77	(Romania) U-BT Cluj-Napoca	Belgrade
13:00	Scoring by quarter: 34–18, 23–31, 19–17, 21–11
Arena Sport	Pts: Jones 16; Rebs: Stevens 6 Asts: Vildoza 7 PIR: Jones, Hayes 19	Boxscore	Pts: Smart 15; Rebs: McCreary, Plavšić 6 Asts: Livingston II 7 PIR: Plavšić 19	Arena: Ranko Žeravica Sports Hall; Attendance: 1,017; Referees: Shaker Nasrollah, Hakan Senkesen, Stefan Vuković

8 November 2026 7	Partizan (Serbia)	92–80	(Montenegro) SC Derby	Belgrade
13:00	Scoring by quarter: 16–25, 26–22, 22–17, 28–16
Arena Sport	Pts: Franks 16; Rebs: Nakić 7 Asts: Allman 6 PIR: Tanasković 20	Boxscore	Pts: Davis 17; Rebs: Davis 7 Asts: Caruthers 6 PIR: Davis, Uskoković 18	Arena: Ranko Žeravica Sports Hall; Attendance: 1,127; Referees: Haris Bijedić, Vladimir Mihajlović, Peter Gačić

14 November 2026 8	Zadar (Croatia)	81–74	(Serbia) Partizan	Zadar
18:30	Scoring by quarter: 27–23, 26–10, 11–16, 17–25
Arena Sport	Pts: Williams 20; Rebs: Bičić 6 Asts: Williams 6 PIR: Williams 22	Boxscore	Pts: Reeves 15; Rebs: Lakić 6 Asts: Allman Jr. 8 PIR: Allman Jr. 15	Arena: Krešimir Ćosić Hall; Attendance: 5,500; Referees: Milosav Kaluđerović, Bojan Popović, Jovan Vujović

22 November 2026 9	Partizan (Serbia)	78–76	(United Arab Emirates) Dubai Basketball	Belgrade
19:30
Arena Sport		Boxscore		Arena: Belgrade Arena; Referees: Shaker Nasrollah, Stefan Atomulese, Milan Danilović

5 December 2026 10	Perspektiva Ilirija (Slovenia)	vs.	(Serbia) Partizan	Ljubljana
20:00
Arena Sport		Boxscore		Arena: Arena Stožice

13 December 2026 11	Partizan (Serbia)	vs.	(Serbia) Spartak Office Shoes	Belgrade
Arena Sport		Boxscore		Arena: Belgrade Arena

20 December 2026 12	Mega Superbet (Serbia)	vs.	(Serbia) Partizan	Belgrade
Arena Sport		Boxscore		Arena: Ranko Žeravica Sports Hall

26 December 2026 13	U-BT Cluj-Napoca (Romania)	vs.	(Serbia) Partizan	Cluj-Napoca
Arena Sport		Boxscore		Arena: BTarena

3 January 2027 14	SC Derby (Montenegro)	vs.	(Serbia) Partizan	Podgorica
Arena Sport		Boxscore		Arena: Morača Sports Center

9 January 2027 15	Vienna (Austria)	vs.	(Serbia) Partizan	Vienna
17:00
Arena Sport		Boxscore		Arena: Hallmann Dome

18 January 2027 16	Partizan (Serbia)	vs.	(Croatia) Zadar	Belgrade
Arena Sport		Boxscore		Arena: Belgrade Arena

25 January 2027 17	Dubai Basketball (United Arab Emirates)	vs.	(Serbia) Partizan	Dubai
Arena Sport		Boxscore		Arena: Coca-Cola Arena

31 January 2027 18	Partizan (Serbia)	vs.	(Bosnia and Herzegovina) Bosna BH Telecom	Belgrade
Arena Sport		Boxscore		Arena: Belgrade Arena

== EuroLeague ==
=== Regular season ===
Pos	Team	Pld	W	L	PF	PA	PD	Qualification
9	(Spanish Basketball Federation) Real Madrid	13	7	6	1227	1152	+75	Qualification to play-in
10	(Israeli Basketball Association) Hapoel IBI Tel Aviv	13	7	6	1175	1138	+37	Qualification to play-in
11	(Basketball Federation of Serbia) Partizan Mozzart Bet	13	7	6	1005	1001	+4	
12	(French Federation of Basketball) Paris Basketball	13	7	6	1168	1200	−32	
13	(Turkish Basketball Federation) Anadolu Efes	13	6	7	1127	1123	+4	

Updated to match(es) played on 20 November 2026. Source: EuroLeague
Rules for classification: Regular season tiebreakers

==== Matches ====
Win Loss

25 September 2026 1	Partizan (Serbia)	92–76	(Italy) Armani Olimpia Milan	Belgrade
20:45	Scoring by quarter: 20–16, 22–20, 21–22, 29–18
Arena Sport, EuroLeague TV	Pts: Jones 20; Rebs: Tanasković 6 Asts: Jones 10; PIR: Jones 33	Boxscore	Pts: Gudurić, Peters 17; Rebs: Wright 7 Asts: Gudurić 5 PIR: Peters 21	Arena: Belgrade Arena; Attendance: 13,783; Referees: Robert Lottermoser, Jordi Aliaga, Thomas Bissuel

29 September 2026 2	Paris Basketball (France)	79–92	(Serbia) Partizan	Paris
20:45	Scoring by quarter: 18–15, 22–29, 23–23, 16–25
Arena Sport, EuroLeague TV	Pts: Hifi 19; Rebs: Rhoden 9 Asts: Hifi, Dokossi 4 PIR: Rhoden 16	Boxscore	Pts: Jones 20; Rebs: Jekiri 7 Asts: Jones, Pajola 5 PIR: Jones 26	Arena: Adidas Arena; Attendance: 5,680; Referees: Carlos Peruga, Ioannis Foufis, Sergio Manuel

2 October 2026 3	FC Bayern Munich (Germany)	84–86	(Serbia) Partizan	Munich
20:00	Scoring by quarter: 27–22, 20–24, 18–11, 19–29
Arena Sport, EuroLeague TV	Pts: Washington 20; Rebs: Wiley 10; Asts: Washington 4 PIR: Thiemann 25	Boxscore	Pts: Jekiri 17; Rebs: Jekiri 5 Asts: Pajola 7 PIR: Jekiri 21	Arena: SAP Garden; Attendance: 11,500; Referees: Mehdi Difallah, Joseph Bissang, Vassilis Pitsilkas

8 October 2026 4	Real Madrid (Spain)	86–76	(Serbia) Partizan	Madrid
20:45	Scoring by quarter: 27–19, 26–18, 18–20, 15–19
Arena Sport, EuroLeague TV	Pts: Maledon 13; Rebs: Tavares 8 Asts: Maledon 4 PIR: Tavares 14	Boxscore	Pts: Jones 19; Rebs: Thompson 8 Asts: Jones, Pajola 5 PIR: Jones 27	Arena: Movistar Arena; Attendance: 8,579; Referees: Emin Moğulkoç, Miloš Koljenšić, Marcin Kowalski

13 October 2026 5	Partizan (Serbia)	55–72	(Greece) Panathinaikos AKTOR	Belgrade
20:30	Scoring by quarter: 16–16, 12–19, 9–20, 19–17
Arena Sport, EuroLeague TV	Pts: Hayes 10; Rebs: Jekiri 7 Asts: Thompson, Vildoza 4 PIR: Hayes 17	Boxscore	Pts: Hayes-Davis 14; Rebs: Lessort 9 Asts: Francisco 5 PIR: Lessort, Fall 15	Arena: Belgrade Arena; Attendance: 20,073; Referees: Emilio Perez, Manuel Attard, Gentian Cici

15 October 2026 6	Fenerbahçe Tarfin (Turkey)	74–65	(Serbia) Partizan	Istanbul
19:45	Scoring by quarter: 12–19, 13–9, 34–16, 15–21
Arena Sport, EuroLeague TV	Pts: Shields 17; Rebs: Bingham Jr. 9 Asts: Horton-Tucker 5 PIR: Shields 25	Boxscore	Pts: Thompson 13; Rebs: six players 4 Asts: Jones 8 PIR: Hayes 10	Arena: Ülker Sports and Event Hall; Attendance: 8,176; Referees: Mehdi Difallah, Alberto Baena, Arnau Padros

22 October 2026 7	Partizan (Serbia)	85–82(OT)	(Serbia) Crvena zvezda Meridianbet	Belgrade
20:45	Scoring by quarter: 31–21, 21–17, 13–12, 10–25, Overtime: 10–7
Arena Sport, EuroLeague TV	Pts: Jones 26; Rebs: Hayes 8 Asts: Jones 5 PIR: Jones 28	Boxscore	Pts: Jones 22; Rebs: Nwora 8 Asts: Jones 4 PIR: Jones 23	Arena: Belgrade Arena; Attendance: 19,102; Referees: Carlos Peruga, Borys Ryzhyk, Thomas Bissuel

28 October 2026 8	LDLC ASVEL (France)	82–75	(Serbia) Partizan	Lyon
20:00	Scoring by quarter: 22–19, 14–13, 20–27, 26–16
Arena Sport, EuroLeague TV	Pts: Waters, Mills 14; Rebs: Massa 5 Asts: Waters 7 PIR: Waters 19	Boxscore	Pts: Hayes 15; Rebs: Hayes 8 Asts: Pajola 7 PIR: Hayes 21	Arena: LDLC Arena; Attendance: 8,424; Referees: Juan Carlos Garcia, Marcin Kowalski, Rain Peerandi

30 October 2026 9	Žalgiris (Lithuania)	87–80	(Serbia) Partizan	Kaunas
19:00	Scoring by quarter: 27–21, 17–19, 25–17, 18–23
Arena Sport, EuroLeague TV	Pts: Edwards 17; Rebs: Valančiūnas 8 Asts: Evans 6 PIR: Valančiūnas 25	Boxscore	Pts: Tanasković 19; Rebs: Thompson 6 Asts: Jones 7 PIR: Tanasković, Thompson 19	Arena: Žalgiris Arena; Attendance: 14,799; Referees: Emin Moğulkoç, Jordi Aliaga, Hugues Thepenier

6 November 2026 10	Partizan (Serbia)	88–67	(Israel) Maccabi Rapyd Tel Aviv	Belgrade
20:45	Scoring by quarter: 28–23, 22–12, 22–17, 16–15
Arena Sport, EuroLeague TV	Pts: Thompson 16; Rebs: Stevens 8 Asts: Jones 7 PIR: Stevens 22	Boxscore	Pts: Theis 11; Rebs: Brissett 7 Asts: Clark 6 PIR: Theis 15	Arena: Belgrade Arena; Attendance: 13,812; Referees: Mehdi Difallah, Manuel Attard, Christian Theis

11 November 2026 11	Partizan (Serbia)	80–66	(Spain) Kosner Baskonia	Belgrade
20:45	Scoring by quarter: 23–18, 19–20, 23–22, 15–6
Arena Sport, EuroLeague TV	Pts: Jekiri 17; Rebs: Jekiri 6 Asts: Jones 6 PIR: Jekiri 25	Boxscore	Pts: Duarte 15; Rebs: Faried 8 Asts: Duarte, Simmons 3 PIR: Duarte 18	Arena: Belgrade Arena; Attendance: 13,706; Referees: Borys Ryzhyk, Oļegs Latiševs, Maxime Boubert

17 November 2026 12	Partizan (Serbia)	64–76	(Spain) Valencia Basket	Belgrade
20:45	Scoring by quarter: 13–16, 21–20, 17–16, 13–24
Arena Sport, EuroLeague TV	Pts: Jones 21; Rebs: Franks 6 Asts: Jones 5 PIR: Jones 27	Boxscore	Pts: Brooks, Taylor 15; Rebs: Sako 11; Asts: Cárdenas 3 PIR: Taylor 17	Arena: Belgrade Arena; Attendance: 13,956; Referees: Robert Lottermoser, Arturas Sukys, Hugues Thepenier

20 November 2026 13	Partizan (Serbia)	91–87(OT)	(Turkey) Beşiktaş	Belgrade
20:45	Scoring by quarter: 20–22, 21–19, 22–18, 14–182, Overtime: 14–10
Arena Sport, EuroLeague TV	Pts: Jones 21; Rebs: Franks 6 Asts: Pajola 8 PIR: Allman Jr. 24	Boxscore	Pts: Walker IV 22; Rebs: Omoruyi 9 Asts: Wilbekin 10; PIR: Wilbekin 25	Arena: Aleksandar Nikolić Hall; Attendance: 7,032; Referees: Gytis Vilius, Kristaps Konstantinovs, Joseph Bissang

25 November 2026 14	Dubai Basketball (United Arab Emirates)	vs.	(Serbia) Partizan	Dubai
17:00
Arena Sport, EuroLeague TV		Boxscore		Arena: Coca-Cola Arena

3 December 2026 15	Virtus Bologna (Italy)	vs.	(Serbia) Partizan	Bologna
21:00
Arena Sport, EuroLeague TV		Boxscore		Arena: PalaDozza

11 December 2026 16	Partizan (Serbia)	vs.	(Spain) FC Barcelona	Belgrade
20:45
Arena Sport, EuroLeague TV		Boxscore		Arena: Belgrade Arena

15 December 2026 17	Anadolu Efes (Turkey)	vs.	(Serbia) Partizan	Istanbul
18:30
Arena Sport, EuroLeague TV		Boxscore		Arena: Basketball Development Center

18 December 2026 18	Olympiacos (Greece)	vs.	(Serbia) Partizan	Athens
19:30
Arena Sport, EuroLeague TV		Boxscore		Arena: SUNEL Arena

22 December 2026 19	Hapoel IBI Tel Aviv (Israel)	vs.	(Serbia) Partizan	Sofia (Note: During the 2026–27 EuroLeague season, both Hapoel IBI Tel Aviv and Maccabi Rapyd Tel Aviv are playing their home games outside of Israel due to the ongoing Gaza war and the 2026 Iran war. Maccabi Rapyd Tel Aviv host their games at Spyros Kyprianou Athletic Center in Limassol, Cyprus, while Hapoel IBI Tel Aviv play at Arena 8888 in Sofia, Bulgaria, until further notice.)
19:45
Arena Sport, EuroLeague TV		Boxscore		Arena: Arena 8888 Sofia

29 December 2026 20	Partizan (Serbia)	vs.	(Lithuania) Žalgiris	Belgrade
20:45
Arena Sport, EuroLeague TV		Boxscore		Arena: Belgrade Arena

7 January 2027 21	Valencia Basket (Spain)	vs.	(Serbia) Partizan	Valencia
20:30
Arena Sport, EuroLeague TV		Boxscore		Arena: Roig Arena

13 January 2027 22	Beşiktaş (Turkey)	vs.	(Serbia) Partizan	Istanbul
18:00
Arena Sport, EuroLeague TV		Boxscore		Arena: Basketball Development Center

15 January 2027 23	Partizan (Serbia)	vs.	(Turkey) Fenerbahçe Tarfin	Belgrade
20:45
Arena Sport, EuroLeague TV		Boxscore		Arena: Belgrade Arena

21 January 2027 24	Partizan (Serbia)	vs.	(Greece) Olympiacos	Belgrade
20:45
Arena Sport, EuroLeague TV		Boxscore		Arena: Belgrade Arena

29 January 2027 25	Armani Olimpia Milan (Italy)	vs.	(Serbia) Partizan	Milan
20:30
Arena Sport, EuroLeague TV		Boxscore		Arena: Unipol Forum

2 February 2027 26	Partizan (Serbia)	vs.	(Spain) Real Madrid	Belgrade
20:45
Arena Sport, EuroLeague TV		Boxscore		Arena: Belgrade Arena

5 February 2027 27	Partizan (Serbia)	vs.	(Israel) Hapoel IBI Tel Aviv	Belgrade
20:45
Arena Sport, EuroLeague TV		Boxscore		Arena: Belgrade Arena

11 February 2027 28	Crvena zvezda Meridianbet (Serbia)	vs.	(Serbia) Partizan	Belgrade
20:00
Arena Sport, EuroLeague TV		Boxscore		Arena: Belgrade Arena

4 March 2027 29	Kosner Baskonia (Spain)	vs.	(Serbia) Partizan	Vitoria-Gasteiz
20:45
Arena Sport, EuroLeague TV		Boxscore		Arena: Buesa Arena

9 March 2027 30	Partizan (Serbia)	vs.	(France) Paris Basketball	Belgrade
20:45
Arena Sport, EuroLeague TV		Boxscore		Arena: Belgrade Arena

11 March 2027 31	Partizan (Serbia)	vs.	(Turkey) Anadolu Efes	Belgrade
20:45
Arena Sport, EuroLeague TV		Boxscore		Arena: Belgrade Arena

18 March 2027 32	Partizan (Serbia)	vs.	(Germany) FC Bayern Munich	Belgrade
20:45
Arena Sport, EuroLeague TV		Boxscore		Arena: Belgrade Arena

23 March 2027 33	Partizan (Serbia)	vs.	(Italy) Virtus Bologna	Belgrade
20:45
Arena Sport, EuroLeague TV		Boxscore		Arena: Belgrade Arena

25 March 2027 34	Panathinaikos AKTOR (Greece)	vs.	(Serbia) Partizan	Athens
20:15
Arena Sport, EuroLeague TV		Boxscore		Arena: Telekom Center Athens

2 April 2027 35	Partizan (Serbia)	vs.	(France) LDLC ASVEL	Belgrade
20:45
Arena Sport, EuroLeague TV		Boxscore		Arena: Belgrade Arena

7 April 2027 36	Maccabi Rapyd Tel Aviv (Israel)	vs.	(Serbia) Partizan	Limassol
18:00
Arena Sport, EuroLeague TV		Boxscore		Arena: Spyros Kyprianou Athletic Center

9 April 2027 37	Partizan (Serbia)	vs.	(United Arab Emirates) Dubai Basketball	Belgrade
20:45
Arena Sport, EuroLeague TV		Boxscore		Arena: Belgrade Arena

16 April 2027 38	FC Barcelona (Spain)	vs.	(Serbia) Partizan	Barcelona
20:30
Arena Sport, EuroLeague TV		Boxscore		Arena: Palau Blaugrana

== Individual awards ==
EuroLeague

MVP of the Round

- (South Sudan) Carlik Jones – Round 1
