= 2026–27 ABA League First Division =

Basketball league in south-east Europe

AdmiralBet ABA League
- Season: 2026–27
- Duration: 2 October 2026 – 31 January 2027 (Regular season)
- Teams: 20
- TV partner: Arena Sport

The 2026–27 AdmiralBet ABA League is the 26th season of the ABA League. Besides 18 teams from Austria, Bosnia and Herzegovina, Croatia, Montenegro, Romania, Serbia, Slovenia and United Arab Emirates, the ABA league board proposed expansion from 18 to 20 teams; with two additional wild cards. There were applicants from Italy, Switzerland and Poland, but the wild cards were given to Slovan Bratislava from Slovakia and KK Cibona from Croatia (whose team will return to the competition after a one-year absence).

Dubai Basketball are the defending champions.

== Promotion and relegation ==
Promoted	(Basketball Federation of Bosnia and Herzegovina) Široki	2025–26 ABA 2 Champion
Affiliation	(Austria) Vienna	3-year license
Affiliation	(United Arab Emirates Basketball Association) Dubai Basketball	3-year license
Affiliation	(Romania) U-BT Cluj-Napoca	3-year license
Affiliation	(Slovakia) Slovan Bratislava	3-year license
Affiliation	(Croatia) Cibona	Wild card
Relegated	(Croatia) Split	Finished last

== Venues and locations ==
Location of teams in the 2026–27 season
Location of teams in the 2026–27 season
Locations of the teams from Belgrade in the 2026–27 season
Location of the team from UAE in the 2026–27 season

Team	Home city	Arena	Capacity
(Basketball Federation of Serbia) Borac Mozzart	Čačak	Borac Hall	4,000
(Basketball Federation of Bosnia and Herzegovina) Bosna BH Telecom	Sarajevo	Zetra Olympic Hall	12,000
(Basketball Federation of Montenegro) Budućnost VOLI	Podgorica	Morača Sports Center	6,000
(Basketball Federation of Slovenia) Cedevita Olimpija	Ljubljana	Arena Stožice	12,480
(Croatian Basketball Federation) Cibona	Zagreb	Dražen Petrović Hall	5,400
(Basketball Federation of Serbia) Crvena zvezda Meridianbet	Belgrade	Aleksandar Nikolić hall	8,000
(United Arab Emirates Basketball Association) Dubai Basketball	Dubai	Coca-Cola Arena	17,000
(Basketball Federation of Serbia) FMP	Belgrade	Železnik Hall	3,000
(Basketball Federation of Bosnia and Herzegovina) Igokea m:tel	Aleksandrovac	Laktaši Sports Hall	3,050
(Slovenia) Ilirija	Ljubljana	Tivoli Hall	6,800
(Slovenia) Krka	Novo Mesto	Leon Štukelj Hall	2,500
(Basketball Federation of Serbia) Mega Superbet	Belgrade	Ranko Žeravica Sports Hall	5,000
(Basketball Federation of Serbia) Partizan Mozzart Bet	Belgrade	Belgrade Arena	18,386
(Slovak Basketball Association) Slovan Bratislava	Bratislava	Gopass Arena	5,500
(Basketball Federation of Serbia) Spartak Office Shoes	Subotica	Dudova Šuma Hall	2,000
(Basketball Federation of Montenegro) SC Derby	Podgorica	Morača Sports Center	6,000
(Basketball Federation of Bosnia and Herzegovina) Široki	Široki Brijeg	Pecara Sports Hall	4,500
(Romania) U-BT Cluj-Napoca	Cluj-Napoca	BTarena	10,000
(Austria) Vienna	Vienna	Hallmann Dome	1,399
(Croatian Basketball Federation) Zadar	Zadar	Krešimir Ćosić Hall	7,997

== Regular season ==
=== Group A ===
==== Standings ====
Pos	Team	Pld	W	L	PF	PA	PD	Pts	Qualification or relegation
1	(Basketball Federation of Serbia) Crvena zvezda Meridianbet	4	3	1	368	339	+29	7	Advance to Top 8
2	(Basketball Federation of Montenegro) Budućnost VOLI	4	3	1	345	324	+21	7	Advance to Top 8
3	(Basketball Federation of Serbia) Borac Mozzart	4	3	1	365	351	+14	7	Advance to Top 8
4	(Basketball Federation of Bosnia and Herzegovina) Široki TT Kabeli	4	3	1	326	314	+12	7	Advance to Top 8
5	(Basketball Federation of Slovenia) Cedevita Olimpija	4	2	2	332	322	+10	6	Advance to Playout
6	(Slovak Basketball Association) Slovan Bratislava	4	2	2	347	352	−5	6	Advance to Playout
7	(Basketball Federation of Serbia) FMP	4	2	2	322	330	−8	6	Advance to Playout
8	(Croatian Basketball Federation) Cibona	4	1	3	351	358	−7	5	Advance to Playout
9	(Basketball Federation of Bosnia and Herzegovina) Igokea m:tel	4	1	3	341	357	−16	5	Advance to Playout
10	(Basketball Federation of Slovenia) Krka	4	0	4	302	352	−50	4	Advance to Playout

Updated to match(es) played on 24 October. Source: ABA League

=== Group B ===
==== Standings ====
Pos	Team	Pld	W	L	PF	PA	PD	Pts	Qualification or relegation
1	(Basketball Federation of Serbia) Partizan Mozzart Bet	4	4	0	353	301	+52	8	Advance to Top 8
2	(United Arab Emirates Basketball Association) Dubai Basketball	4	4	0	378	328	+50	8	Advance to Top 8
3	(Croatian Basketball Federation) Zadar	4	2	2	319	301	+18	6	Advance to Top 8
4	(Romanian Basketball Federation) U-BT Cluj-Napoca	4	2	2	355	343	+12	6	Advance to Top 8
5	(Basketball Federation of Bosnia and Herzegovina) Bosna BH Telecom	4	2	2	362	352	+10	6	Advance to Playout
6	(Basketball Federation of Serbia) Spartak Office Shoes	4	2	2	330	328	+2	6	Advance to Playout
7	(Basketball Federation of Serbia) Mega Superbet	4	2	2	303	349	−46	6	Advance to Playout
8	(Basketball Federation of Slovenia) Perspektiva Ilirija	4	1	3	312	324	−12	5	Advance to Playout
9	(Basketball Austria) Vienna	4	1	3	328	351	−23	5	Advance to Playout
10	(Basketball Federation of Montenegro) SC Derby	4	0	4	324	387	−63	4	Advance to Playout

Updated to match(es) played on 25 October. Source: ABA League

== MVP List ==
=== MVP of the Round ===
Round	Player	Team	PIR	Ref.
Regular season
1	TBA			
2	(United States) Jamiya Neal	(Serbia) FMP	32	
3	(United States) Deandre Gholston	(Bosnia and Herzegovina) Bosna BH Telecom	30	
4	(United States) Cameron Shelton	(Slovenia) Perspektiva Ilirija	39	
5	(Serbia) Andrej Lučić	(Serbia) Mega Superbet	30	
6	(Canada) Mfiondu Kabengele	(United Arab Emirates) Dubai Basketball	33	
7	(Serbia) Nikola Jovanović	(Austria) Vienna	27	
8	(United States) Rickey McGill	(Croatia) Cibona	36	
9				
10				
11				
12				
13				
14				
15				
16				
17				
18				

Source: ABA League

=== MVP of the Month ===
Month	Player	Team	Ref.
2026
October	(United States) Kahliel Spear	(Serbia) Borac Mozzart	
November			
December			
2027
January & February			
March			
April			

== Clubs in European competitions ==
Competition	Team	Progress	Result
EuroLeague	(United Arab Emirates Basketball Association) Dubai Basketball	Regular season	
EuroLeague	(Basketball Federation of Serbia) Partizan Mozzart Bet	Regular season	
EuroLeague	(Basketball Federation of Serbia) Crvena zvezda Meridianbet	Regular season	
EuroCup	(Basketball Federation of Montenegro) Budućnost VOLI	Regular season	
EuroCup	(Romanian Basketball Federation) U-BT Cluj-Napoca	Regular season	
EuroCup	(Basketball Federation of Slovenia) Cedevita Olimpija	Regular season	
EuroCup	(Basketball Federation of Bosnia and Herzegovina) Bosna BH Telecom	Regular season	
Champions League	(Basketball Federation of Serbia) Spartak Office Shoes	Regular season	
Champions League	(Basketball Federation of Bosnia and Herzegovina) Igokea m:tel	Regular season	
Champions League	(Croatian Basketball Federation) Cibona	Regular season	
Champions League	(Austria) Vienna	Qualification round – Eight–finals	Eliminated by (Hellenic Basketball Federation) Promitheas Patras
FIBA Europe Cup	(Austria) Vienna	Regular season Group D	
EuroLeague SuperCup	(United Arab Emirates Basketball Association) Dubai Basketball	Fourth place	Lost to (Turkish Basketball Federation) Fenerbahçe Tarfin

== See also ==
- 2026–27 ABA League Second Division
- 2026–27 WABA League
