= 2009–10 ABA NLB League =

2009–10 Liga ABA season
- League: Liga ABA
- Sport: Basketball
- Duration: October 10, 2009 - March 20, 2010
- Games: 182
- Teams: Serbia (5 teams); Croatia (4 teams); Bosnia and Herzegovina (2 teams); Slovenia (2 teams); Montenegro (1 team)

Regular season
- Season champions: (Croatia) Cibona
- Season MVP: (United States) Chester Mason (Široki)
- Top scorer: (Croatia) Andrija Žižić (Cedevita) (17.12 ppg)

Final four
- Champions: (Serbia) Partizan
- Runners-up: (Croatia) Cibona
- Finals MVP: (United States) Jamont Gordon (Cibona)

NLB League seasons
- ← 2008–09 2010–11 →

The 2009–10 NLB Liga ABA was the 9th season of the Liga ABA. 14 teams from Serbia, Croatia, Slovenia, Bosnia and Herzegovina and Montenegro participated in the NLB League: Union Olimpija, Helios, Cibona, Zagreb, Zadar, Split, Bosna, Široki Eronet, Partizan, Crvena zvezda, FMP, Hemofarm, Radnički Kragujevac, Budućnost. The 2009-10 NLB League Final Four was held on April 23–25, 2010, in Arena Zagreb.

== Team information ==
=== Venues and locations ===
Location of the NLB League 2009-10 teams

Country	Teams	Team	City	Venue (Capacity)
Serbia	5			
Serbia	5	Partizan	Belgrade	Pionir Hall (8,150)
Serbia	5	Hemofarm STADA	Vršac	Millennium Center (5,000)
Serbia	5	Crvena zvezda	Belgrade	Pionir Hall (8,150)
Serbia	5	FMP	Belgrade	Železnik Hall (3,000)
Serbia	5	Radnički	Kragujevac	Hala Jezero (5,320)
Croatia	4			
Croatia	4	Cibona	Zagreb	Dražen Petrović Basketball Hall (5,400)
Croatia	4	Zadar	Zadar	Krešimir Ćosić Hall (9,200)
Croatia	4	Zagreb CO	Zagreb	Trnsko (2,000)
Croatia	4	Cedevita	Zagreb	Sutinska vrela (2,000)
Slovenia	2			
Slovenia	2	Union Olimpija	Ljubljana	Hala Tivoli (6,000)
Slovenia	2	Helios	Domžale	Dvorana Komunalnega centra (2,180)
Bosnia and Herzegovina	2			
Bosnia and Herzegovina	2	Bosna ASA BHT	Sarajevo	Dvorana Mirza Delibašić (6,500)
Bosnia and Herzegovina	2	Široki HT Eronet	Široki Brijeg	"Pecara" (4,500)
Montenegro	1			
Montenegro	1	Budućnost m:tel	Podgorica	Morača Sports Center (4,570)

== Regular season ==
The regular season began on Saturday, October 10, 2009, and ended on Saturday, March 20, 2010.

=== Standings ===
	Team	Pld	W	L	PF	PA	Diff	Pts
1	Cibona	26	20	6	2038	1802	236	46
2	Partizan	26	20	6	2021	1842	179	46
3	Hemofarm STADA	26	17	9	2059	1912	147	43
4	Union Olimpija	26	15	11	2004	1875	129	41
5	Budućnost m:tel	26	15	11	1964	1876	88	41
6	Zagreb CO	26	14	12	2054	2076	-22	40
7	Cedevita	26	13	13	2037	2097	-60	39
8	Zadar	26	13	13	2118	1960	158	39
9	Crvena zvezda	26	11	15	2069	2012	57	37
10	Široki HT Eronet	26	11	15	1949	2013	-64	37
11	Radnički	26	11	15	1826	2008	-182	37
12	FMP	26	10	16	1965	2055	-90	36
13	Bosna ASA BHT	26	6	20	1778	2053	-275	32
14	Helios	26	6	20	1756	2057	-301	32

Qualified for Final four
Relegated

Pld - Played; W - Won; L - Lost; PF - Points for; PA - Points against; Diff - Difference; Pts - Points.

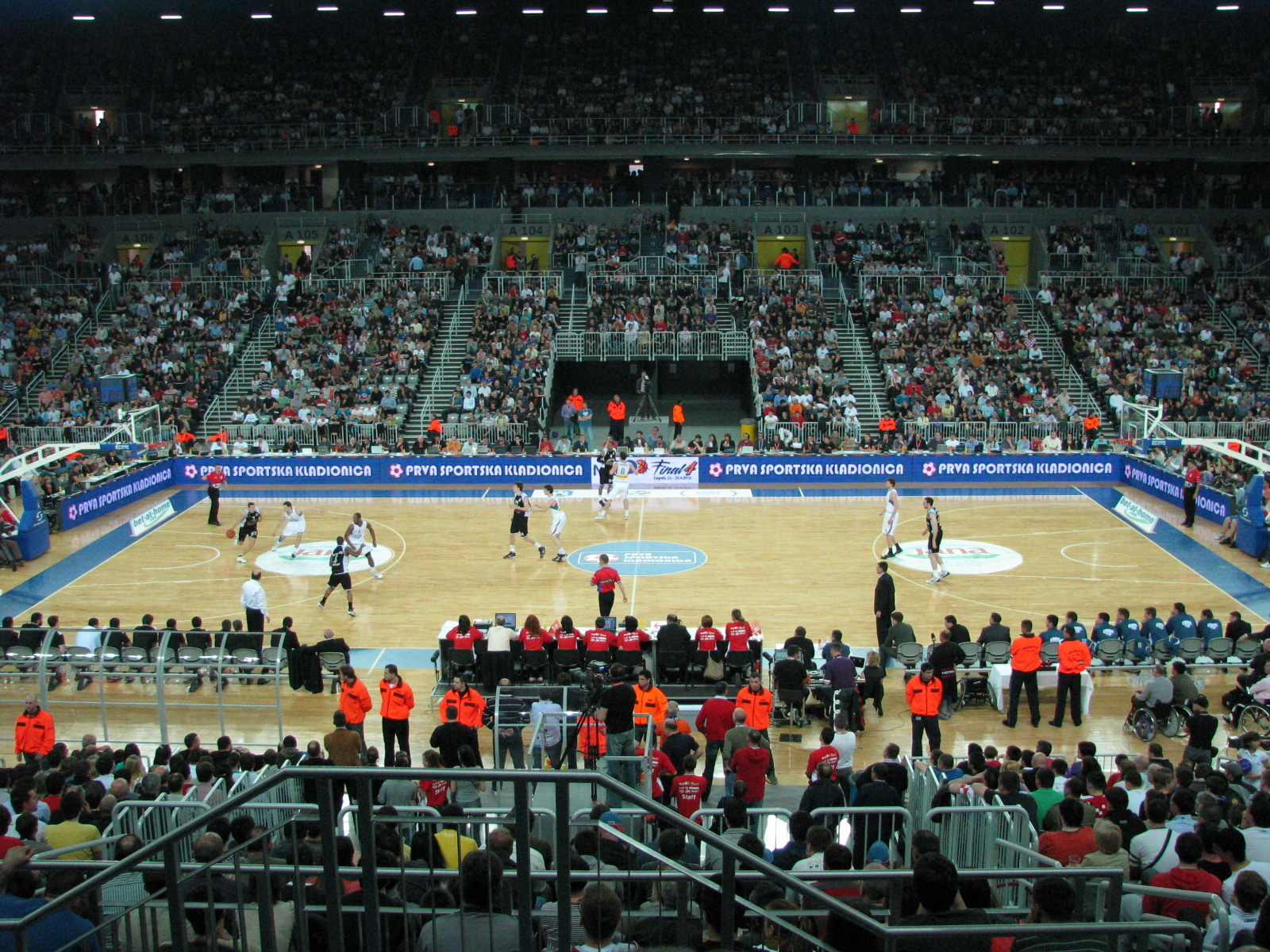
Final game KK Cibona vs. KK Partizan in Arena Zagreb

=== Schedule and results ===
1. round (10.10.2009.)
Partizan - FMP	86-59
Cibona - Široki	85-65
Helios - Cedevita	76-69
Hemofarm - Radnički	72-77
Zadar - Olimpija	79-59
Bosna - Zagreb	64-71
Budućnost - Crvena zvezda	71-63

6. round (07.11.2009.)
FMP - Olimpija	67-79
Radnički - Zagreb	57-75
Cedevita - Crvena zvezda	88-74
Široki - Budućnost	76-72
Partizan - Bosna	72-58
Cibona - Zadar	68-65
Helios - Hemofarm	60-85

11. round (05.12.2009.)
Bosna - FMP	68-66
Budućnost - Zadar	97-81
Crvena zvezda - Hemofarm	86-88
Zagreb - Helios	84-69
Olimpija - Cibona	71-63
Radnički - Partizan	67-73
Cedevita - Široki	93-86 (ot)

16. round (16.01.2010.)
FMP - Cibona	95-71
Partizan - Helios	84-76
Široki - Hemofarm	76-94
Cedevita - Zadar	75-69
Radnički - Bosna	83-69
Olimpija - Budućnost	78-82
Zagreb - Crvena zvezda	81-80

21. round (13.02.2010.)
Radnički - FMP	81-77
Olimpija - Cedevita	82-68
Zagreb - Široki	71-81
Crvena zvezda - Partizan	74-84
Budućnost - Cibona	62-72
Bosna - Helios	66-55
Zadar - Hemofarm	70-75

26. round (20.03.2010.)
FMP - Budućnost	73-70
Bosna - Crvena zvezda	68-67
Zadar - Zagreb	72-65
Hemofarm - Olimpija	73-60
Helios - Radnički	73-71
Cibona - Cedevita	93-82
Partizan - Široki	80-69

2. round (13.10.2009.)
FMP - Crvena zvezda	85-81 (ot)
Zagreb - Budućnost	80-75
Olimpija - Bosna	89-67
Radnički - Zadar	72-69
Cedevita - Hemofarm	91-87
Široki - Helios	72-77
Partizan - Cibona	51-64

7. round (14.11.2009.)
Hemofarm - FMP	77-63
Zadar - Helios	97-70
Bosna - Cibona	55-80
Budućnost - Partizan	59-65
Crvena zvezda - Široki	97-81
Zagreb - Cedevita	91-79
Olimpija - Radnički	85-65

12. round (12.12.2009.)
FMP - Široki	86-68
Partizan - Cedevita	95-75
Cibona - Radnički	92-55
Helios - Olimpija	51-73
Hemofarm - Zagreb	74-66
Zadar - Crvena zvezda	89-83
Bosna - Budućnost	73-77

17. round (19.01.2010.)
Zagreb - FMP	90-81
Crvena zvezda - Olimpija	71-72
Budućnost - Radnički	79-67
Bosna - Cedevita	63-76
Zadar - Široki	88-65
Hemofarm - Partizan	90-91
Helios - Cibona	59-73

22. round (27.02.2010.)
FMP - Zadar	83-81
Hemofarm - Bosna	80-60
Helios - Budućnost	58-73
Cibona - Crvena zvezda	82-79
Partizan - Zagreb	90-70
Široki - Olimpija	73-67
Cedevita - Radnički	80-72

3. round (17.11.2009.)
Cibona - FMP	77-59
Helios - Partizan	67-73
Hemofarm - Široki	83-69
Zadar - Cedevita	89-85
Bosna - Radnički	75-67
Budućnost - Olimpija	79-85
Crvena zvezda - Zagreb	89-66

8. round (17.11.2009.)
FMP - Radnički	97-66
Cedevita - Olimpija	70-73
Široki - Zagreb	74-72
Partizan - Crvena zvezda	73-76
Cibona - Budućnost	79-54
Helios - Bosna	66-60
Hemofarm - Zadar	67-58

13. round (19.12.2009.)
Budućnost - FMP	78-70
Crvena zvezda - Bosna	85-79
Zagreb - Zadar	95-97
Olimpija - Hemofarm	72-79
Radnički - Helios	69-66
Cedevita - Cibona	72-87
Široki - Partizan	48-63

18. round (23.01.2010.)
FMP - Helios	81-65
Cibona - Hemofarm	55-57
Partizan - Zadar	86-74
Široki - Bosna	90-62
Cedevita - Budućnost	83-71
Radnički - Crvena zvezda	55-68
Olimpija - Zagreb	82-85

23. round (06.03.2010.)
Cedevita - FMP	79-67
Radnički - Široki	71-61
Olimpija - Partizan	73-81
Zagreb - Cibona	76-87
Crvena zvezda - Helios	102-71
Budućnost - Hemofarm	83-68
Bosna - Zadar	87-83

4. round (24.10.2009.)
FMP - Zagreb	81-86
Olimpija - Crvena zvezda	94-76
Radnički - Budućnost	55-82
Cedevita - Bosna	83-76
Široki - Zadar	83-70
Partizan - Hemofarm	84-80 (ot)
Cibona - Helios	98-66

9. round (21.11.2009.)
Zadar - FMP	90-69
Bosna - Hemofarm	72-82
Budućnost - Helios	72-63
Crvena zvezda - Cibona	72-51
Zagreb - Partizan	85-83
Olimpija - Široki	86-82 (ot)
Radnički - Cedevita	67-58

14. round (22.12.2009.)
FMP - Partizan	81-84
Široki - Cibona	72-83
Cedevita - Helios	92-81
Radnički - Hemofarm	77-69
Olimpija - Zadar	84-77
Zagreb - Bosna	83-65
Crvena zvezda - Budućnost	77-88

19. round (30.01.2010.)
Olimpija - FMP	95-54
Zagreb - Radnički	87-80
Crvena zvezda - Cedevita	83-63
Budućnost - Široki	77-57
Bosna - Partizan	84-86 (ot)
Zadar - Cibona	87-92 (ot)
Hemofarm - Helios	75-76

24. round (13.03.2010.)
FMP - Bosna	89-80 (ot)
Zadar - Budućnost	83-78
Hemofarm - Crvena zvezda	76-70
Helios - Zagreb	71-84
Cibona - Olimpija	59-85
Partizan - Radnički	85-62
Široki - Cedevita	88-74

5. round (31.10.2009.)
Helios - FMP	73-80
Hemofarm - Cibona	94-96 (ot)
Zadar - Partizan	77-66
Bosna - Široki	64-75
Budućnost - Cedevita	95-65
Crvena zvezda - Radnički	100-101
Zagreb - Olimpija	77-67

10. round (28.11.2009.)
FMP - Cedevita	85-87
Široki - Radnički	96-83
Partizan - Olimpija	80-70
Cibona - Zagreb	113-76
Helios - Crvena zvezda	66-72
Hemofarm - Budućnost	89-71
Zadar - Bosna	104-54

15. round (09.01.2010)
Crvena zvezda - FMP	87-73
Budućnost - Zagreb	82-73
Bosna - Olimpija	79-76 (ot)
Zadar - Radnički	86-60
Hemofarm - Cedevita	87-71
Helios - Široki	72-64
Cibona - Partizan	69-59

20. round (06.02.2010.)
FMP - Hemofarm	81-75
Helios - Zadar	65-111
Cibona - Bosna	87-62
Partizan - Budućnost	75-56
Široki - Crvena zvezda	95-80
Cedevita - Zagreb	100-88
Radnički - Olimpija	74-70

25. round (16.03.2010.)
Široki - FMP	83-63
Cedevita - Partizan	79-72
Radnički - Cibona	72-64
Olimpija - Helios	77-64
Zagreb - Hemofarm	77-83 (ot)
Crvena zvezda - Zadar	77-72
Budućnost - Bosna	81-68

== Stats Leaders ==
=== Points ===
Rank	Name	Team	Points	Games	PPG
1.	(Croatia) Andrija Žižić	Cedevita	428	25	17,12
2.	(Croatia) Damir Mulaomerović	Zagreb	352	21	16,76
3.	(Croatia) Marko Tomas	Cibona	429	28	15,32
4.	(Serbia) Milan Mačvan	Hemofarm	350	24	14,58
5.	(United States) Jamont Gordon	Cibona	403	28	14,39

=== Rebounds ===
Rank	Name	Team	Rebounds	Games	RPG
1.	(United States) Chester Mason	Široki	202	25	8,08
2.	(Australia) Aleksandar Marić	Partizan	165	22	7,50
3.	(United States) Lawrence Roberts	Partizan	182	26	7,00
4.	(Croatia) Tomislav Ružić	Zadar	173	26	6,73
5.	(Croatia) Luka Žorić	Zagreb	173	26	6,65

=== Assists ===
Rank	Name	Team	Assists	Games	APG
1.	(Bosnia and Herzegovina) Feliks Kojadinović	Bosna	122	21	5,81
2.	(Slovenia) Jure Močnik	Helios	122	22	5,55
3.	(Serbia) Stefan Marković	Hemofarm	117	25	4,68
4.	(United States) Chester Mason	Široki	116	25	4,64
5.	(United States) Jamont Gordon	Cibona	128	28	4,57

=== Ranking MVP ===
Rank	Name	Team	Efficiency	Games	Average
1.	(United States) Chester Mason	Široki	499	25	19,96
2.	(Serbia) Milan Mačvan	Hemofarm	436	24	18,17
3.	(Australia) Aleksandar Marić	Partizan	394	22	17,91
4.	(Croatia) Andrija Žižić	Cedevita	445	25	17,80
5.	(Croatia) Luka Žorić	Zagreb	461	26	17,73

=== MVP Round by Round ===
Round	Player	Team	Efficiency
1	(Serbia) Marko Brkić	Radnički	29
2	(Canada) Jermaine Anderson	Cedevita	31
3	(Serbia) Boban Marjanović	Hemofarm	36
4	(Australia) Aleks Marić	Partizan	36
5	(Croatia) Marko Tomas	Cibona	43
6	(Croatia) Andrija Žižić	Cedevita	40
7	(Bulgaria) Filip Videnov	Crvena zvezda	43
8	(United States) Chester Mason	Široki	39
9	(Croatia) Ante Tomić	Zagreb	35
10	(United States) Chester Mason (2)	Široki	34
11	(Croatia) Marino Baždarić	Cedevita	28
12	(Montenegro) Goran Jeretin	Budućnost	34
13	(Serbia) Miroslav Raduljica	FMP	36
14	(Serbia) Nemanja Protić	FMP	37
15	(Montenegro) Slavko Vraneš	Partizan	31
16	(United States) Jamont Gordon	Cibona	34
17	(Croatia) Damir Mulaomerović	Zagreb	41
18	(United States) Matt Walsh	Olimpija	28
19	(Croatia) Lukša Andrić	Cibona	31
20	(Croatia) Ivan Grgat	Široki	41
21	(Canada) Jermaine Anderson (2)	Cedevita	31
22	(United States) Jamont Gordon (2)	Cibona	33
23	(Serbia) Nemanja Bjelica	Crvena zvezda	44
24	(United States) Chester Mason (3)	Široki	57
25	(Serbia) Milan Mačvan	Hemofarm	32
26	(Serbia) Miroslav Raduljica (2)	FMP	33
27	(United States) Jamont Gordon (3)	Cibona	31
28	(United States) Jamont Gordon (4)	Cibona	31

Source: NLB League

== Final four ==
Matches played in, Arena Zagreb, Zagreb, Croatia

Semifinals; April 23
1	Cibona	78
4	Union Olimpija	73
2	Partizan	72
3	Hemofarm STADA	67

Final; April 25
1	Cibona	74
2	Partizan	75 (OT)

=== Semifinals ===
==== Partizan vs. Hemofarm STADA ====
April 23
17:15 CET

Report

Partizan (Serbia)	72–67	(Serbia) Hemofarm STADA
Scoring by quarter: 14-18, 26-16, 12-12, 20-21
Pts: Roberts 16; Rebs: Roberts 11; Asts: Božić, Marić, McCalebb 2		Pts: Mačvan 16; Rebs: Marjanović 9 Asts: Marković, Borisov 2

Arena Zagreb, Zagreb
Attendance: -
Referees: Srđan Dožai (CRO), Siniša Herceg (CRO), Saša Maričić (SRB)

==== Cibona vs. Union Olimpija ====
April 23
20:15 CET

Report

Cibona (Croatia)	78–73	(Slovenia) Union Olimpija
Scoring by quarter: 26-18, 22-26, 18-8, 12-21
Pts: Gordon 23; Rebs: Bogdanović 10; Asts: Gordon 5		Pts: Klobučar 19; Rebs: Klobučar, Aleksandrov 6 Asts: Ilievski 3

Arena Zagreb, Zagreb
Attendance: 13,000
Referees: Ilija Belošević (SRB), Milivoje Jovčić (SRB), Milija Vojinović (SRB)

=== Final ===
April 25
17:15 CET

Report

Cibona (Croatia)	74–75 (OT)	(Serbia) Partizan
Scoring by quarter: 14-15, 17-16, 13-13, 16-16, Overtime: 14-15
Pts: Gordon, Tomas 31; Rebs: Gordon, Andrić 5 Asts: Tomas 3		Pts: Marić 14; Rebs: Roberts 14; Asts: Veselý 3

Arena Zagreb, Zagreb
Attendance: 16,200
Referees: Sašo Pukl (SLO), Matej Boltauzer (SLO), Damir Javor (SLO)

2009–10 ABA NLB League Champions
(Serbia)
Partizan
4th title
