= Andrija Žižić =

Croatian basketball player (born 1980)

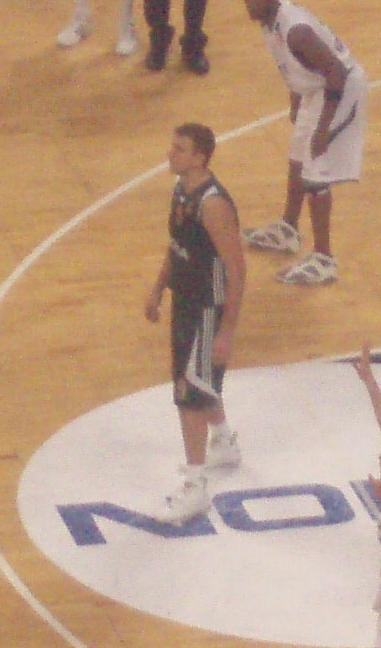
- Žižić with Panathinaikos in 2008

Cibona
- Title: Sporting director
- League: ABA League; Croatian League

Personal information
- Born: 14 January 1980 (age 46) Split, SR Croatia, SFR Yugoslavia
- Listed height: 2.07 m (6 ft 9 in)
- Listed weight: 120 kg (265 lb)

Career information
- NBA draft: 2002: undrafted
- Playing career: 1998–2016
- Position: Power forward / center

Career history
- 1998–2003: Split CO
- 2003–2004: Cibona
- 2004–2005: FC Barcelona
- 2005–2007: Olympiacos
- 2007–2008: Panathinaikos
- 2008–2009: Galatasaray Cafe Crown
- 2009: CAI Zaragoza
- 2009–2010: Cedevita
- 2010–2011: ASVEL Basket
- 2011: Cedevita
- 2011–2013: Cibona
- 2014: Astana
- 2014: Maccabi Tel Aviv
- 2014–2015: Credito di Romagna Forli
- 2015: Pallacanestro Piacentina
- 2015–2016: Cibona

Career highlights
- EuroLeague champion (2014); Greek League champion (2008); 4× Croatian League champion (2003, 2004, 2012, 2013); Israeli League champion (2014); Greek Cup winner (2008); Croatian Cup winner (2013); Greek League All-Star (2006); Adriatic League Top Scorer (2010); Adriatic League rebounding champion (2003); EuroLeague records since the 2000–01 season: Most 2-point field goals made in a game without a miss
Medals
Men's basketball
Representing Croatia
World U-19 Cup
Bronze medal – third place	1999 Portugal	U-19 Team
European U-18 Championship
Silver medal – second place	1998 Bulgaria	U-18 Team

Andrija Žižić (born 14 January 1980) is a Croatian former professional basketball player and executive. Standing of 2.07 m (6 ft 9 ½ in) tall, he played at both the power forward and center positions. He is currently the sporting director for Cibona of the ABA League and the Croatian League.

== Professional career ==
In his career, some of the teams that Žižić played with were: Omiš, Solin, Split, Cibona Zagreb, FC Barcelona, Olympiacos, Panathinaikos. He won two Croatian League championships (2003, 2004), and in the 2002–03 season, he was the top rebounder in the Adriatic League (8.2 rebounds per game). He won the Greek League championship and the Greek Cup in the 2007–08 season.

On 17 July 2008, Žižić signed a two-year contract with the Turkish team Galatasaray Cafe Crown. On 15 January 2009, he left Galatasaray, and signed with the Spanish club CAI Zaragoza, for the rest of the season. On June 24, 2010, he signed with ASVEL Lyon-Villeurbanne in France. On 28 February 2011, he left ASVEL, and signed with Cedevita Zagreb, for the rest of the season.

In the summer of 2011, he returned to Cibona Zagreb. On 12 December 2013, he parted ways with Cibona. On 3 January 2014, he signed with Astana. On 12 February 2014, he left Astana, and signed with Maccabi Tel Aviv for the rest of the season. With Maccabi, the third club he joined in the 2013–14 season, he became a EuroLeague champion, playing in the role of the team's third string center.

In September 2014, he joined the Italian second division side Credito di Romagna Forli. On 6 January 2015, he left Forli, and signed with Pallacanestro Piacentina of the Italian third division. On 5 March 2015, he parted ways with Piacentina.

In August 2015, he returned to Cibona Zagreb, playing alongside his younger brother, Ante Žižić, in the process.

== National team career ==
Žižić was a member of the senior Croatia national basketball team. He also won a silver medal at the 1998 FIBA Europe Under-18 Championship, and a bronze medal at the 1999 FIBA Under-19 World Championship, while playing with the Croatian national junior teams.

== Post-playing career ==
Shortly after the 2015–16 season ended, Žižić announced his retirement from playing professional basketball, and he became the sporting director for Cibona Zagreb.

== Career statistics ==
Legend
GP	Games played	GS	Games started	MPG	Minutes per game
FG%	Field-goal percentage	3P%	3-point field-goal percentage	FT%	Free-throw percentage
RPG	Rebounds per game	APG	Assists per game	SPG	Steals per game
BPG	Blocks per game	PPG	Points per game	PIR	Performance index rating
**Bold**	Career high

=== EuroLeague ===
†	Denotes seasons in which Žižić won the EuroLeague

Year	Team	GP	GS	MPG	FG%	3P%	FT%	RPG	APG	SPG	BPG	PPG	PIR
2003–04	Cibona	19	1	22.1	.522	**1.000**	.672	5.3	.1	.2	.1	11.1	9.3
2004–05	Cibona	10	10	**30.5**	.532	.000	.617	**7.8**	**1.4**	**.6**	—	**14.5**	**14.7**
2004–05	Barcelona	5	2	18.4	.448	—	**.944**	4.8	.6	.2	—	8.6	10.8
2005–06	Olympiacos	**23**	**22**	20.6	.558	**1.000**	.790	4.4	.3	**.6**	.0	8.3	9.6
2006–07	Olympiacos	22	**22**	24.9	**.571**	.250	.798	5.2	1.0	.5	**.2**	12.2	13.0
2007–08	Panathinaikos	18	7	14.0	**.571**	.000	.600	1.7	.4	.2	—	5.2	2.1
2013–14†	Maccabi	10	3	4.9	.444	—	—	1.3	.4	—	—	0.8	0.8
Career		107	67	20.0	.543	.375	.733	4.3	.6	.4	.1	9.0	8.7

== Personal life ==
Žižić is the older brother of the professional basketball player Ante Žižić, who played for the Cleveland Cavaliers of the National Basketball Association (NBA).
