= Nikola Tanasković =

Serbian basketball player

- Tanasković with Partizan in 2026

No. 10 – Partizan Belgrade
- Position: Power forward / center
- League: Serbian SuperLeague; ABA League; EuroLeague

Personal information
- Born: October 21, 1997 (age 29) Smederevska Palanka, Serbia, FR Yugoslavia
- Listed height: 2.04 m (6 ft 8 in)
- Listed weight: 102 kg (225 lb)

Career information
- NBA draft: 2019: undrafted
- Playing career: 2017–present

Career history
- 2017–2019: Partizan
- 2017–2018: →Spartak Subotica
- 2018–2019: →Mladost Zemun
- 2019: →OKK Beograd
- 2019–2020: Mega
- 2020–2021: Borac Banja Luka
- 2021–2023: Igokea
- 2023: Breogán
- 2023: Igokea
- 2023–2026: Budućnost
- 2026–present: Partizan

Career highlights
- Serbian Cup winner (2018); Bosnian League champion (2022); Bosnian Cup winner (2022); Montenegrin League champion (2026)

Nikola Tanasković (Serbian Cyrillic: Никола Танасковић, born 21 October 1997) is a Serbian professional basketball player for Partizan Belgrade of the Serbian SuperLeague, the ABA League, and the EuroLeague. He also represents the Serbia national team.

== Professional career ==
=== Partizan (2017–2019) ===
In December 2015, 18-year-old Tanasković signed his first professional contract with Partizan Belgrade. On 17 February 2017, Tanasković made his debut for Partizan in Radivoj Korać Cup against Dunav, he recorded 10 points and 11 rebounds.

=== Mega (2019–2020) ===
On June 10, 2019, Tanasković signed for Mega Bemax.

=== Borac Banja Luka (2020–2021) ===
In September 2020, he signed for the Bosnian team Borac Banja Luka.

=== Igokea (2021–2023) ===
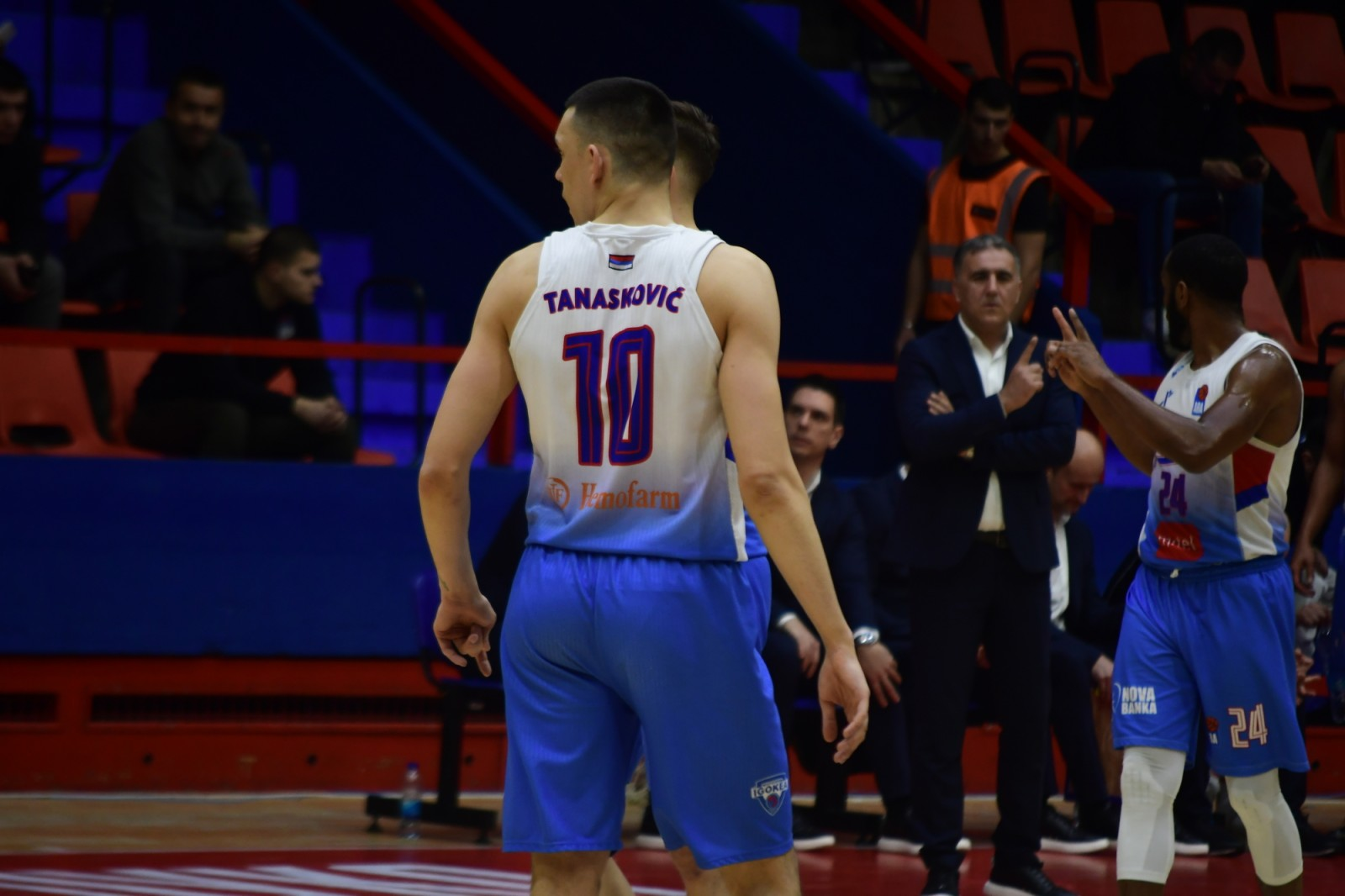
Tanasković with Igokea in 2022

In June 2021, Tanasković signed a two-year contract with Igokea.

=== Breogán (2023) ===
On March 26, 2023, he signed with Rio Breogán of the Spanish Liga ACB.

=== Return to Igokea (2023) ===
He returned to Igokea in August of the same year.

=== Budućnost (2023–2026) ===
On December 23, 2023, he signed with Budućnost VOLI of the Montenegrin Prva A Liga and the ABA League.

=== Return to Partizan (2026–present) ===
On July 25, 2026, Tanasković signed a multi-year deal with Partizan of the Serbian SuperLeague, the ABA League, and the EuroLeague.

== Career achievements and awards ==
- Serbian Cup winner: 1 (with Partizan NIS: 2017–18)
- Bosnian Cup winner: 1 (with Igokea: 2021–22)

== Personal life ==
His younger brother Dušan is a basketball player who currently plays for MZT Skopje.
