= ABA League =

1st-tier regional men's professional basketball league

AdmiralBet ABA League
- Formerly: Goodyear liga (2001–2006); NLB League (2006–2010)
- Organising body: ABA League JTD
- Founded: 2001; 25 years ago
- First season: 2001–02
- Countries: Austria; Bosnia and Herzegovina; Croatia; Montenegro; North Macedonia (Second Division); Serbia; Slovakia; Slovenia; United Arab Emirates; Romania; Bulgaria (former); Czech Republic (former); Hungary (former); Israel (former)
- Confederation: FIBA Europe
- Number of teams: 20
- Level on pyramid: 1
- Relegation to: ABA Second Division
- Domestic cup: ABA Super Cup
- International cups: EuroLeague; EuroCup; Basketball Champions League; FIBA Europe Cup
- Current champions: (United Arab Emirates) Dubai Basketball (1st title) (2025–26)
- Most championships: (Serbia) Partizan (8 titles)
- CEO: Dubravko Kmetović
- President: Ostoja Mijailović (president of ABA League JTD)
- TV partners: Arena Sport
- Website: aba-liga.com
- 2026–27 season

The ABA League, renamed the ABA League First Division in 2017, is the top-tier regional men's professional basketball league that originally featured clubs from former Yugoslavia (Bosnia and Herzegovina, Croatia, Montenegro, North Macedonia, Serbia and Slovenia). Due to sponsorship reasons, the league was also known as the Goodyear League from 2001 to 2006, the NLB League from 2006 to 2011, and as the AdmiralBet ABA League from 2021.

The league coexists alongside scaled-down national leagues in Bosnia and Herzegovina, Croatia, North Macedonia, Montenegro, Serbia, and Slovenia. All but one of Adriatic League clubs join their country's own competitions in late spring after the Adriatic League regular season and post-season have been completed. In the past, the league has also consisted of clubs from Bulgaria (Levski), the Czech Republic (ČEZ Nymburk), Hungary (Szolnoki Olaj), and Israel (Maccabi Tel Aviv) that received wild card invitations. In the 2024–25 season, Dubai Basketball from the United Arab Emirates also joined the league. In the following 2025–26 season, it was expanded to 18 teams with the participating other European countries in Romania (U-BT Cluj-Napoca) and Austria (BC Vienna) and two nine team groups.

The Adriatic League is a private venture, founded in 2001 and run until 2015 by the Sidro, a Slovenian limited liability company. Since 2015, the league has been operated by ABA League JTD, a Zagreb-based general partnership for organizing sports competitions. Adriatic Basketball Association is the body that organizes the league and is a full member of ULEB, as well as a voting member of Euroleague Basketball's board.

== History ==
At various points throughout mid-to-late 1990s, in the years following the breakup of SFR Yugoslavia and ensuing Yugoslav Wars, different basketball administrators from the newly formed southeast European countries floated and informally discussed the idea of re-assembling a joint basketball competition to fill the void left by the dissolution of the former Yugoslav Basketball League whose last season was 1991–92.

However, no concrete action towards that end was taken before the summer 2000 ULEB-supported creation of Euroleague Basketball Company under the leadership of Jordi Bertomeu that immediately confronted FIBA Europe, then proceeded to take a handful of top European clubs into its new competition for the 2000–01 season thereby opening an organizational split in European club basketball. During the 2000–01 split in the continent's top club competition, local regional basketball administrators from the ULEB-affiliated clubs Cibona, Olimpija, and Budućnost (that already competed in this new 'breakaway' Euroleague competition) shifted the discussions of creating a regional basketball league into higher gear.

On the public relations front, Adriatic League was met with strong and mixed reactions. Even though many hailed it as an important step for the development of club basketball in Southeast Europe, others felt that it brings no new quality and that it's not worth dismantling three domestic leagues. There was a lot of negative reaction from political circles, especially in Croatia, with even TV panel discussions being broadcast on Croatian state television. A very vociferous opinion in the country saw the league's formation as a political attempt to reinstate Yugoslavia. The league organizers for their part did their best to appease the Croatian public with statements such as the one delivered by Radovan Lorbek in Slobodna Dalmacija in September 2001:

This is not a Yugoslav league, and it will never become a Yugoslav league. The Adriatic League has no clubs from Serbia and Macedonia, therefore the Adriatic League and Yugoslav league are not the same thing.

Ten years later, in a 2011 interview for the Serbian newspaper Press, Roman Lisac explained the league's behind the scenes strategy during its nascent stages was actually quite different:

I'm convinced the league would've never been able to survive without Serbian clubs. Getting Crvena zvezda and Partizan to join the league was something that we worked on from day one. However, the situation ten years ago was not that simple. Too much antagonistic post-war politics was still all around us, and it made our task all the more difficult. Everything that smelled of old Yugoslavia caused a lot of resistance both in Croatia and in Serbia. I repeat, the idea of having both Crvena zvezda and Partizan in the league was there from the very beginning, but we avoided talking about it publicly because of politics.

The league is still occasionally criticized by observers around European basketball for reducing the scope and calendar of the domestic competitions that it replaced for the region's more-established clubs, particularly by clubs and influential figures within Serbia who would like its ABA members to better enhance domestic competition, such as Serbian national-team coach Svetislav Pesic.

=== Foundational steps ===
The competition was agreed upon in principle at a meeting in Ljubljana on 3 July 2001 by a founding assembly containing representatives of four basketball clubs: KK Bosna, KK Budućnost, KK Cibona, and KK Olimpija. The day is considered to be the league's foundation date. Though club representatives from four countries attended the meeting, the main individuals behind the venture were six Slovenians and Croatians: Roman Lisac, Zmago Sagadin (at the time head coach of Olimpija), Radovan Lorbek (at the time president of Olimpija), Josip Bilić, Danko Radić, and Bože Miličević (at the time president of Cibona). The name chosen for the competition was the Adriatic League, invoking the Adriatic Sea as a common thread for participant countries thus purposely avoiding the terms 'Balkans' or 'Yugoslavia' that at the time carried a fairly undesirable public perception in Slovenia and an extremely negative one in Croatia. Sidro d.o.o., the commercial entity that runs it, was created two months later in Slovenia.

On 28 September 2001, the league announced a five-year sponsorship deal with Slovenian company Sava Tires from Kranj, a subsidiary of Goodyear Tire and Rubber Company. The deal also included naming rights, hence from 2001 until 2006, the competition was known as the Goodyear League.

=== Debut season ===
With twelve clubs taking part in the inaugural 2001–02 season, the competition commenced in fall 2001 with four teams from Slovenia, four teams from Croatia, three teams from Bosnia-Herzegovina, and one team from FR Yugoslavia. The first game was contested in Ljubljana between Olimpija and Široki on Saturday, 29 September 2001 at 5:30pm.

Though the competition purported to gather the strongest sides from former Yugoslavia, as mentioned, teams from Serbia were noticeably absent, particularly Belgrade powerhouses and biggest regional crowd draws Partizan and Crvena zvezda. In addition to no clubs from Serbia proper, the league had no Serb-dominated clubs from Bosnia-Herzegovina either. Since the league founders mostly avoided talking about the issue due to fears of media backlash, the fact that no invitations were extended to Serbian clubs was generally explained through security issues due to organizers' fears of crowd trouble if Croatian and Serbian clubs were to start playing again in the same competition. Then in early February 2002, the public got a preview of just that when Cibona and Partizan met in Zagreb as part of that season's EuroLeague group stage. In a nationalistically charged and incident-filled encounter, Croatian fans peppered the Partizan players with rocks, flares, and even ceramic tiles before physically assaulting Partizan head coach Duško Vujošević in the guest team dressing room after the game.

The Adriatic League debut season was marked by dwindling attendances and lukewarm media support. Still the league did receive a bit of a shot in the arm on 24 February 2002, when its managing body ABA got accepted as full member of ULEB.

=== Second season ===
For the 2002–03 season, the league remained at the total number of 12 teams, while it went through major re-tooling internally. By the time season started, four teams dropped out (Sloboda Dita, Budućnost, Triglav, and Geoplin Slovan) to be replaced by: Israeli powerhouse Maccabi Tel Aviv, Crvena zvezda (the first team from Serbia in the competition), the Bosnian outfit KK Borac, and Croatian club KK Zagreb.

It was important for the league's long-term business to negotiate acceptable terms for the Serbian clubs to join the competition. To that end, Lorbek and Lisac went to Belgrade in early April 2002 with an offer of taking in three clubs from FR Yugoslavia for the Adriatic League's 2002–03 season. The offer was flatly rejected initially by the representatives of five YUBA Liga clubs – Partizan, Crvena zvezda, Hemofarm, FMP, and Budućnost – as their unified platform was either all five or nothing. Taking in all five required expanding the league to 14 teams, which was something the league organizers weren't prepared to do due to the associated increase in operating costs. The negotiated agreement thus fell through for the time being. However, it didn't take long for dents to appear in the unified front put forth by five YUBA league clubs – in May 2002 Crvena zvezda's management (three businessmen close to the ruling Democratic Party in Serbia: Živorad Anđelković, Igor Žeželj, and Goran Vesić) hired Zmago Sagadin to be the club's new general manager – and soon after, in June 2002, the club broke the ranks by negotiating terms on its own thus agreeing to join the Adriatic League for the 2002–03 season.

=== Later developments ===
For the 2003-04 season, the league expanded to 14 teams, while relegating KK Bosna; meanwhile, Maccabi Tel Aviv departed the league in the wake of political unrest in Serbia. In replacement, 4 teams joined: KK Reflex of Serbia (who would win the league in their first season), Lovćen 1947 and Budućnost of Montenegro, and KD Slovan of Slovenia. The latter two of those returned to the league after a year's absence, having been relegated from the 2001–02 season. In the 2004-05 season, the league expanded again to 16 teams while relegating 3, and its Final Four tournament became a Final Eight. Its clubs included for the first time Serbian powerhouse Partizan, and another Serbian former-holdout club, Hemofarm (who would win the league in its first year participating). After the season, the league contracted down from 16 back to 14 clubs, a number it would stay at until the 2017-18 season. In September 2006 the league signed a general sponsorship contract with Nova ljubljanska banka (NLB) and was renamed to NLB League, while keeping Goodyear as one of the major sponsors. The league's first all-star game was held in December 2006 in Ljubljana.

For the 2011-12 season, Israeli club Maccabi Tel Aviv rejoined the Adriatic League for one season, winning it. In 2012, a team from North Macedonia participated for the first time, with MZT Skopje Aerodrom joining the league for the 2012-13 season.

A conflict emerged in early 2015 between the ABA and FIBA Europe, resulting in the former's loss of recognition by the latter, as a part of the broader FIBA–EuroLeague dispute. On 13 April 2015, ABA League signed a 4-year agreement with Euroleague Basketball for one EuroLeague and 3 EuroCup annual slots. Because of this agreement, FIBA threatened to suspend the six constituent national federations, and on 30 April it suspended ABA League from membership. FIBA wanted the league controlled by the national federations and clubs, while the ABA's organizing corporation, Sidro, wanted to maintain independence. A restructuring proposal from the league's clubs to FIBA in June 2015 involving reincorporating the competition under a new legal entity owned by the clubs was approved by FIBA, and the league's recognition reinstated. The next April, however, FIBA nevertheless suspended 8 nations' ability to have their senior men's national teams participate in EuroBasket 2017, including all 6 constituent members of ABA League plus Russia and Spain, and further threatened their ability to participate in the 2016 Olympics. The suspension of the ABA League was continued by FIBA in May 2016, and letters sent by FIBA to the national associations insisted that any federation that was associated with Euroleague would be punished similarly. Analysis later that year suggested that FIBA's goal was to apply leverage to Euroleague in their dispute by depriving Euroleague's competitions of their ABA League club participants. With the emergence of a FIBA-Euroleague truce in mid-2016, FIBA Europe announced in May 2016 that no federations or teams would, in the end, be suspended from national competition. Despite this, and despite their clubs' continued participation in EuroLeague and EuroCup, the ABA League has not re-joined ULEB as of 2023.

Following the 2016-17 season, and in keeping with their restructuring agreement with FIBA, the league elected to split into two divisions: the relegated team(s) from the First Division would join the Second Division the following year, and the latter promoting to the former, with 12 teams initially in each division (reduced from 14 previously). The Second Division would be composed of the top-finishing clubs of each country's domestic league in the previous season who were not already participating in the ABA League. The allocation of teams between countries was a contentious process, but the reorganization yielded a 25% jump in attendance for the First Division's next season.

=== Expansion to Dubai ===
In October 2023, the ABA League's sports director told news media of the league's intention to have a team from Dubai join the competition, and possibly for the city to host an ABA League Final Four competition. On 19 March 2024, the league officially announced Dubai Basketball would join the league starting from the 2024–25 season, obtaining a license for three seasons.

== Competition ==
=== Competition system ===
As of the 2013–14 season the league comprises a 26-game regular season, with the top 4 sides making the play-offs.

From 2002 through 2004, four teams qualified, and the playoffs were termed the "Final Four"; starting in 2005, eight teams advanced to the "Final Eight" round. All playoff rounds consist of one-off knockout matches, unusual among European leagues. However, since all Adriatic League clubs play in domestic leagues at the same time, and many also play in the EuroLeague, the current format has the virtue of limiting fixture congestion for the playoff sides.

In 2017, the ABA League Second Division was created. The last qualified team from ABA League would be relegated to the Second Division and replaced by the winner of this one.

Starting with the 2025–26 season, the ABA League has decided to expand the competition to 18 teams. As part of this change, two wildcard entries were offered and have been purchased by U-BT Cluj-Napoca and BC Vienna.

=== Current clubs ===
The following 20 clubs are competing in the 2026–27 ABA season:

(Serbia) Borac Čačak	(Bosnia and Herzegovina) Bosna	(Montenegro) Budućnost	(Slovenia) Cedevita Olimpija
(Croatia) Cibona	(Serbia) Crvena zvezda	(United Arab Emirates) Dubai Basketball	(Serbia) FMP
(Bosnia and Herzegovina) Igokea	(Slovenia) Ilirija	(Slovenia) Krka	(Serbia) Mega
(Serbia) Partizan	(Slovakia) Slovan Bratislava	(Serbia) Spartak	(Montenegro) Studentski centar
(Bosnia and Herzegovina) Široki	(Romania) U-BT Cluj-Napoca	(Austria) Vienna	(Croatia) Zadar

== Finals ==
Year	Final			Semifinalists	
Year	Champions	Score	Runners-up		
2001–02; Details	(Slovenia); Union Olimpija	73–59	(Slovenia); Krka	(Slovenia); Pivovarna Laško	(Croatia); Cibona VIP
2002–03; Details	(Croatia); Zadar	91–88	(Israel); Maccabi Elite Tel Aviv	(Serbia and Montenegro); Crvena zvezda	(Slovenia); Union Olimpija
2003–04; Details	(Serbia and Montenegro); Reflex	71–70	(Croatia); Cibona VIP	(Serbia and Montenegro); Crvena zvezda	(Slovenia); Union Olimpija
2004–05; Details	(Serbia and Montenegro); Hemofarm	89–76	(Serbia and Montenegro); Partizan Pivara MB	(Serbia and Montenegro); Reflex	(Serbia and Montenegro); Crvena zvezda
2005–06; Details	(Serbia and Montenegro); FMP	73–72	(Serbia and Montenegro); Partizan Pivara MB	(Serbia and Montenegro); Crvena zvezda	(Serbia and Montenegro); Hemofarm
2006–07; Details	(Serbia); Partizan	2–0 playoffs	(Serbia); FMP	(Croatia); Cibona VIP	(Serbia); Hemofarm
2007–08; Details	(Serbia); Partizan Igokea	69–51	(Serbia); Hemofarm	(Slovenia); Union Olimpija	(Croatia); Zadar
2008–09; Details	(Serbia); Partizan Igokea	63–49	(Croatia); Cibona VIP	(Serbia); Crvena zvezda	(Serbia); Hemofarm
2009–10; Details	(Serbia); Partizan	75–74 (OT)	(Croatia); Cibona VIP	(Serbia); Hemofarm	(Slovenia); Union Olimpija
2010–11; Details	(Serbia); Partizan	77–74	(Slovenia); Union Olimpija	(Montenegro); Budućnost m:tel	(Slovenia); Krka
2011–12; Details	(Israel); Maccabi Electra Tel Aviv	87–77	(Croatia); Cedevita	(Montenegro); Budućnost VOLI	(Serbia); Partizan mt:s
2012–13; Details	(Serbia); Partizan mt:s	71–63	(Serbia); Crvena zvezda Telekom	(Bosnia and Herzegovina); Igokea	(Serbia); Radnički Kragujevac
2013–14; Details	(Croatia); Cibona	72–59	(Croatia); Cedevita	(Serbia); Crvena zvezda Telekom	(Serbia); Partizan
2014–15; Details	(Serbia); Crvena zvezda Telekom	3–1 playoffs	(Croatia); Cedevita	(Serbia); Partizan NIS	(Montenegro); Budućnost VOLI
2015–16; Details	(Serbia); Crvena zvezda Telekom	3–0 playoffs	(Serbia); Mega Leks	(Croatia); Cedevita	(Montenegro); Budućnost VOLI
2016–17; Details	(Serbia); Crvena zvezda mts	3–0 playoffs	(Croatia); Cedevita	(Montenegro); Budućnost VOLI	(Serbia); Partizan NIS
2017–18; Details	(Montenegro); Budućnost VOLI	3–1 playoffs	(Serbia); Crvena zvezda mts	(Croatia); Cedevita	(Montenegro); Mornar
2018–19; Details	(Serbia); Crvena zvezda mts	3–2 playoffs	(Montenegro); Budućnost VOLI	(Serbia); Partizan NIS	(Croatia); Cedevita
2019–20; Details	Canceled due to the COVID-19 pandemic – no champion announced				
2020–21; Details	(Serbia); Crvena zvezda mts	3–2 playoffs	(Montenegro); Budućnost VOLI	(Montenegro); Mornar	(Bosnia and Herzegovina); Igokea
2021–22; Details	(Serbia); Crvena zvezda mts	3–2 playoffs	(Serbia); Partizan NIS	(Montenegro); Budućnost VOLI	(Slovenia); Cedevita Olimpija
2022–23; Details	(Serbia); Partizan Mozzart Bet	3–2 playoffs	(Serbia); Crvena zvezda Meridianbet	(Montenegro); Budućnost VOLI	(Slovenia); Cedevita Olimpija
2023–24; Details	(Serbia); Crvena zvezda Meridianbet	3–0 playoffs	(Serbia); Partizan Mozzart Bet	(Montenegro); Budućnost VOLI	(Serbia); Mega MIS
2024–25; Details	(Serbia); Partizan Mozzart Bet	3–1 playoffs	(Montenegro); Budućnost VOLI	(United Arab Emirates); Dubai Basketball	(Serbia); Crvena zvezda Meridianbet
2025–26; Details	(United Arab Emirates); Dubai Basketball	3–1 playoffs	(Serbia); Partizan Mozzart Bet	(Montenegro); Budućnost VOLI	(Serbia); Crvena zvezda Meridianbet

== Records and statistics ==
=== By club ===
Club	Won	Runner-up	Years won	Years runner-up
(Serbia) Partizan	8	5	2007, 2008, 2009, 2010, 2011, 2013, 2023, 2025	2005, 2006, 2022, 2024, 2026
(Serbia) Crvena zvezda	7	3	2015, 2016, 2017, 2019, 2021, 2022, 2024	2013, 2018, 2023
(Serbia) FMP	2	1	2004, 2006	2007
(Croatia) Cibona	1	3	2014	2004, 2009, 2010
(Montenegro) Budućnost	1	3	2018	2019, 2021, 2025
(Israel) Maccabi Tel Aviv	1	1	2012	2003
(Serbia) Vršac	1	1	2005	2008
(Slovenia) Olimpija	1	1	2002	2011
(United Arab Emirates) Dubai Basketball	1	0	2026	
(Croatia) Zadar	1	0	2003	
(Croatia) Cedevita	0	4		2012, 2014, 2015, 2017
(Serbia) Mega	0	1		2016
(Slovenia) Krka	0	1		2002
Total	24	24		

=== By country ===
Club / Nation	Won	Runner-up	Finals
Serbia	18	11	29
Croatia	2	7	9
Montenegro	1	3	4
Slovenia	1	2	3
Israel	1	1	2
United Arab Emirates	1	0	1
Total	24	24	48

== All-time participants ==
The following is a list of clubs who have played in the Adriatic League at any time since its formation in 2001 to the current season. A total of 45 teams from 14 countries have played in the League.

2D	Played in the Second Division
Canceled	Season was canceled due to the COVID-19 pandemic
Defunct	Defunct teams
Restricted	Teams out of the Adriatic area
Suspended	Suspended teams
1st	Champions
2nd	Runners-up
SF	Semi-finalists
**Bold**	Teams playing in the 2026–27 season
^{R}	Regular season champions

Team	02	03	04	05	06	07	08	09	10	11	12	13	14	15	16	17	18	19	20 (Note: Season was canceled due to COVID-19 pandemic)	21	22	23	24	25	26	27	Total seasons	Highest finish
(Austria) **Vienna**	Restricted																								15th	TBD	2	15th
(Bosnia and Herzegovina) Borac Banja Luka	–	11th	13th	–	–	–	–	–	–	–	–	–	–	–	–	–	–	–	–	–	–	2D	2D	2D	2D	2D	2	11th
(Bosnia and Herzegovina) **Bosna**	12th	12th	–	QF	QF	10th	–	7th	13th	–	–	–	–	–	–	–	2D	–	–	–	–	–	–	2D	QF	TBD	9	Quarter-finals
(Bosnia and Herzegovina) **Igokea**	–	–	–	–	–	–	–	–	–	11th	–	SF^{R}	6th	12th	9th	5th	10th	8th	Cn.	SF	QF	9th	QF	QF	9th	TBD	16	Semi-finals
(Bosnia and Herzegovina) Sloboda Tuzla	5th	–	–	–	–	–	–	–	–	–	–	–	–	–	–	–	–	–	–	–	–	–	–	–	2D	2D	1	5th
(Bosnia and Herzegovina) **Široki**	6th	9th	12th	13th	11th	11th	12th	–	10th	9th	5th	10th	14th	–	–	–	–	–	2D	2D	2D	2D	2D	2D	2D	TBD	13	5th
(Bulgaria) Levski Sofia	Restricted													14th	Restricted												1	14th
(Croatia) Cedevita	–	–	–	–	–	–	–	–	7th	7th	2nd	6th	2nd	2nd	SF	2nd	SF	SF	as Cedevita Olimpija								10	2nd
(Croatia) **Cibona**	SF	5th	2nd^{R}	QF	QF	SF	QF	2nd	2nd^{R}	12th	7th	11th	1st	11th	8th	7th	11th	7th	Cn.	9th	8th	11th	12th	15th	–	TBD	25	1st
(Croatia) Split	8th	10th	9th	15th	–	14th	10th	10th	–	–	–	14th	–	–	–	–	2D	2D	2D	13th	13th	10th	9th	13th	18th	–	14	8th
(Croatia) Šibenka (including Šibenik)	–	–	–	11th	–	–	–	–	–	–	–	–	–	–	–	–	–	–	–	–	–	–	2D	2D	–	–	1	11th
(Croatia) Kvarner	10th	–	–	–	–	–	–	–	Defunct																		1	10th
(Croatia) **Zadar**	7th	1st	8th	QF	QF	7th	SF	5th	8th	14th	–	12th	13th	8th	6th	12th	6th	11th	Cn.	10th	12th	QF	QF	9th	10th	TBD	25	1st
(Croatia) Zagreb	–	6th	11th	12th	13th	12th	11th	13th	6th	5th	9th	–	–	–	–	–	–	Defunct									10	5th
(Czech Republic) Nymburk	Restricted									8th	Restricted																1	8th
(Hungary) Szolnoki Olajbányász	Restricted											13th	12th	7th	Restricted												3	7th
(Israel) Maccabi Tel Aviv	Restricted	2nd	Restricted								1st^{R}	Restricted															2	1st
(Montenegro) **Budućnost**	9th	–	5th	14th	–	5th	QF	6th	5th	SF	SF	5th	5th	SF	SF^{R}	SF	1st	2nd	Cn.	2nd	SF	SF	SF	2nd^{R}	SF	TBD	24	1st
(Montenegro) Lovćen	–	–	14th	–	–	–	–	–	–	–	–	–	–	–	–	–	2D	2D	2D	2D	2D	–	–	–	–	–	1	14th
(Montenegro) Mornar	–	–	–	–	–	–	–	–	–	–	–	–	–	–	–	8th	SF	9th	Cn.	SF	9th	12th	13th	16th	2D	2D	9	Semi-finals
(Montenegro) **Studentski centar**	–	–	–	–	–	–	–	–	–	–	–	–	–	–	–	–	–	–	–	2D	7th	QF	QF	11th	16th	TBD	6	7th
(Montenegro) Sutjeska	–	–	–	–	–	–	–	–	–	–	–	–	–	–	13th	–	–	2D	2D	2D	2D	2D	2D	2D	2D	2D	1	13th
(North Macedonia) Karpoš Sokoli	–	–	–	–	–	–	–	–	–	–	–	–	–	–	–	10th	Suspended					–	–	–	–	–	1	10th
(North Macedonia) MZT Skopje	–	–	–	–	–	–	–	–	–	–	–	7th	9th	13th	10th	13th	12th	2D	2D	2D	2D	14th	2D	2D	2D	2D	7	7th
(Romania) **U-BT Cluj-Napoca**	Restricted																								QF	TBD	2	Quarter-finals
(Serbia) **Borac Čačak**	–	–	–	–	–	–	–	–	–	–	–	–	–	–	–	–	2D	2D	2D	11th	11th	13th	10th	12th	17th	TBD	7	10th
(Serbia) **Crvena zvezda** (including Crvena zvezda Beograd)	–	SF^{R}	SF	SF	SF	6th	QF	SF	9th	13th	10th	2nd	SF^{R}	1st^{R}	1st	1st^{R}	2nd^{R}	1st^{R}	Cn.	1st^{R}	1st^{R}	2nd	1st^{R}	SF	SF	TBD	25	1st
(Serbia) **FMP** (including FMP Železnik)	–	–	1st	SF	1st	2nd^{R}	QF	8th	12th	–	–	–	–	–	–	9th	8th	6th	Cn.	8th	QF	QF	11th	10th	12th	TBD	18	1st
(Serbia) **Mega**	–	–	–	–	–	–	–	–	–	–	–	–	8th	10th	2nd	6th	9th	5th	Cn.	6th	10th	QF	SF	QF	11th	TBD	14	2nd
(Serbia) Metalac Valjevo	–	–	–	–	–	–	–	–	–	–	–	–	–	6th	11th	–	–	–	–	–	–	–	–	–	–	–	2	6th
(Serbia) **Partizan**	–	–	–	2nd	2nd^{R}	1st	1st^{R}	1st^{R}	1st	1st^{R}	SF	1st	SF	SF	5th	SF	5th	SF	Cn.^{R}	7th	2nd	1st^{R}	2nd	1st	2nd	TBD	23	1st
(Serbia) Radnički Kragujevac	–	–	–	–	–	–	–	–	11th	10th	8th	SF	11th	Defunct													5	Semi-finals
(Serbia) **Spartak**	–	–	–	–	–	–	–	–	–	–	–	–	–	–	–	–	–	–	–	–	–	–	2D	QF	QF	TBD	3	Quarter-finals
(Serbia) Vojvodina Srbijagas	–	–	–	–	QF	–	9th	14th	–	–	–	–	–	–	–	Defunct											3	Quarter-finals
(Serbia) Vršac	–	–	–	1st^{R}	SF	SF	2nd	SF	SF	6th	12th	–	–	–	–	–	2D	2D	–	–	–	–	–	–	2D	–	8	1st
(Slovakia) **Slovan Bratislava**	Restricted																									TBD	1	TBD
(Slovenia) **Cedevita Olimpija**	as Cedevita and Olimpija																		Cn.	5th	SF	SF	QF	QF	QF	TBD	8	Semi-finals
(Slovenia) Domžale	–	–	–	16th	12th	8th	13th	12th	14th	–	13th	–	–	–	–	–	–	2D	2D	2D	2D	2D	2D	2D	2D	–	7	8th
(Slovenia) **Ilirija**	–	–	–	–	–	–	–	–	–	–	–	–	–	–	–	–	–	–	–	–	–	–	–	–	14th	TBD	2	14th
(Slovenia) Koper Primorska	Unfounded														–	–	2D	2D	Cn.	14th	Defunct						2	14th
(Slovenia) Olimpija	1st^{R}	SF	SF	QF	10th	9th	SF	9th	SF	2nd	6th	8th	10th	5th	7th	11th	7th	12th	as Cedevita Olimpija								18	1st
(Slovenia) **Krka**	2nd	7th	7th	–	–	–	–	11th	–	SF	11th	9th	7th	9th	12th	14th	2D	10th	Cn.	12th	14th	2D	14th	14th	13th	TBD	19	2nd
(Slovenia) Slovan Ljubljanja	11th	–	10th	10th	9th	13th	14th	–	–	–	–	–	–	–	–	–	–	–	–	–	–	–	–	–	–	–	6	9th
(Slovenia) Šentjur	–	–	–	–	–	–	–	–	–	–	–	–	–	–	14th	–	–	–	–	–	–	–	–	–	–	–	1	14th
(Slovenia) Zlatorog	SF	8th	6th	9th	14th	–	–	–	–	–	14th	–	–	–	–	–	–	–	–	–	–	–	–	–	–	–	6	Semi-finals
(United Arab Emirates) **Dubai**	Unfounded																							SF	1st^{R}	TBD	3	1st

== Awards ==
- ABA League MVP
- ABA League Finals MVP
- ABA League Top Scorer
- ABA League Ideal Starting Five
- ABA League Top Prospect
- ABA League Player of the Month
- ABA League-winning head coaches

== Records ==
=== Players ===
- **Highest Index Ratings in a Game**
  - 59 by Dejan Milojević, Budućnost vs Reflex on 3 January 2004
- **Most Points in a Game**
  - 48 by Duane Washington Jr, Partizan vs. Krka on 22 December 2025
- **Most Two Point Field Goals Made in a Game**
  - 17 by Márton Báder, Szolnoki Olaj at Široki on 7 October 2012
- **Most Three Point Field Goals Made in a Game**
  - 10 by Josip Sesar, Široki vs. Union Olimpija on 19 November 2005
  - 10 by Teemu Rannikko, Union Olimpija at Zagreb on 18 December 2005
- **Most Free Throws Made in a Game**
  - 19 by Igor Rakočević, Crvena zvezda at Reflex on 16 April 2004
  - 19 by Milan Gurović, Crvena zvezda at FMP on 30 September 2006
  - 19 by Milan Gurović, Crvena zvezda vs. FMP on 16 December 2006
  - 19 by Damir Mulaomerović, Zagreb vs. FMP on 19 January 2010
- **Most Rebounds in a Game**
  - 23 by Tommy Smith, Split vs. Reflex on 4 October 2003
  - 23 by Boris Savović, Hemofarm vs. Radnički Kragujevac on 22 October 2011
- **Most Assists in a Game**
  - 19 by Žan Mark Šiško, Primorska vs. Zadar on 9 December 2019
- **Most Steals in a Game**
  - 9 by Curtis McCants, Split vs. Zagreb on 16 December 2003
  - 9 by Andrés Rodríguez, Union Olimpija at Partizan on 7 November 2004
  - 9 by Jure Močnik, Helios at Split on 6 April 2005
- **Most Blocks in a Game**
  - 7 by Smiljan Pavič, Union Olimpija vs. Bosna on 27 November 2004
  - 7 by Slavko Vraneš, Partizan at Cibona on 10 January 2010
  - 7 by Shawn James, Maccabi Tel Aviv vs. Zlatorog Laško on 5 January 2012
  - 7 by Zoran Nikolić, Budućnost vs. Igokea on 15 October 2016
  - 7 by Uroš Luković, Mornar vs. Mega Basket on 14 December 2019
- **Most Turnovers in a Game**
  - 11 by Jiří Welsch, Union Olimpija at Pivovarna Laško on 9 February 2002
  - 11 by Nikola Korač, Sutjeska at Mega Basket on 30 October 2015
  - 11 by Nejc Barič, Split at FMP on 14 December 2021
  - 11 by Luka Božić, Zadar at Borac on 23 October 2022
- **Triple-Doubles**
  - 2 by Luka Božić
  - 1 by Chester Mason
  - 1 by Feliks Kojadinović

=== Clubs ===
- **Longest winning streak**
  - 20 games by Crvena zvezda for the 2014–15 and 2016–17 seasons
- **Longest losing streak**
  - 21 games by Levski Sofia for the 2014–15 season
- **Biggest Winning Margin**
  - 60 points by Partizan vs. Split in the 2021–22 season
- **Most Won Games in a Season**
  - Crvena zvezda won 25 out of 26 games for the 2016–17 season
- **Most Lost Games in a Season**
  - Bosna lost 21 out of 22 games for the 2002–03 season
- **Most Points scored in a Season**
  - Hemofarm scored 2591 points in 30 games for the 2004–05 season
  - Crvena zvezda scored 2325 points in 26 games for the 2006–07 season
- **Lowest Scored Points in a Season**
  - Bosna scored 1443 points in 22 games for the 2001–02 season
  - Zlatorog Laško scored 1688 points in 26 games for the 2011–12 season

=== All-time leaders ===
From the 2001–02 to the 2024–25 season:

Accumulated
Points	(Bosnia and Herzegovina) **Nemanja Gordić**	3,404
Field goals	(Bosnia and Herzegovina) **Nemanja Gordić**	1,180
3 Points	(Montenegro) Suad Šehović	406
Defensive Rebounds	(Croatia) Marin Rozić	1,043
Offensive Rebounds	(Slovenia) Alen Omić	541
Total Rebounds	(Slovenia) Alen Omić	1,423
Assists	(Bosnia and Herzegovina) **Nemanja Gordić**	1,224
Steals	(Slovenia) Nebojša Joksimović	401
Blocks	(Serbia) Uroš Luković	283
Index Ratings	(Bosnia and Herzegovina) **Nemanja Gordić**	3,272
Games Played	(Serbia) **Branko Lazić**	426

Source: ABA League player statistics
Players in bold are currently playing in the ABA League.

== Notable players ==
Well-known basketball players who have played in the ABA League include:

Australia

- Aron Baynes
- Nathan Jawai
- Aleks Marić
- Steven Marković
- Mark Worthington

Belize

- Milt Palacio

Bosnia and Herzegovina

- Kenan Bajramović
- J. R. Bremer
- Nemanja Gordić
- Jasmin Hukić
- Elmedin Kikanović
- Nenad Marković
- Ratko Varda
- Jusuf Nurkić

Brazil

- Yago dos Santos

Bulgaria

- Filip Videnov

Canada

- Jermaine Anderson
- Carl English
- Brady Heslip
- Michael Meeks

Croatia

- Marko Banić
- Stanko Barać
- Bojan Bogdanović
- Dontaye Draper
- Davor Kus
- Oliver Lafayette
- Davor Marcelić
- Damir Mulaomerović
- Davor Pejčinović
- Zoran Planinić
- Marko Popović
- Nikola Prkačin
- Dino Rađa
- Slaven Rimac
- Josip Sesar
- Krunoslav Simon
- Mate Skelin
- Dario Šarić
- Marko Tomas
- Ante Tomić
- Roko Ukić
- Josip Vranković
- Nikola Vujčić
- Andrija Žižić
- Ante Žižić
- Luka Žorić

Czech Republic

- Jan Veselý
- Jiří Welsch

Finland

- Teemu Rannikko
- Sasu Salin

France

- Joffrey Lauvergne
- Léo Westermann
- Mickaël Gelabale
- Timothé Luwawu-Cabarrot

Gabon

- Stéphane Lasme

Germany

- Maik Zirbes

Greece

- Stratos Perperoglou
- Sofoklis Schortsanitis
- Ioannis Papapetrou

Guyana

- Rawle Marshall

Hungary

- Márton Báder
- István Németh

Israel

- David Blu
- Tal Burstein
- Lior Eliyahu
- Yotam Halperin
- Guy Pnini
- Derrick Sharp
- Gal Mekel

Jamaica

- Kimani Ffriend
- Jerome Jordan

Latvia

- Roberts Štelmahers
- Dāvis Bertāns

Montenegro

- Milko Bjelica
- Nebojša Bogavac
- Omar Cook
- Predrag Drobnjak
- Vladimir Dragičević
- Aleksandar Pavlović
- Nikola Peković
- Slavko Vraneš

Nigeria

- Aloysius Anagonye
- Obinna Ekezie
- Michael Ojo

North Macedonia

- Pero Antić
- Todor Gečevski
- Richard Hendrix
- Vlado Ilievski
- Bo McCalebb
- Gjorgji Čekovski
- Predrag Samardžiski
- Damjan Stojanovski
- Aleksandar Kostoski
- Marko Simonovski
- Bojan Trajkovski
- Darko Sokolov
- Ognen Stojanovski

Panama

- Chris Warren

Puerto Rico

- Larry Ayuso
- Andrés Rodríguez

Serbia

- Ognjen Aškrabić
- Vule Avdalović
- Stefan Birčević
- Nemanja Bjelica
- Bogdan Bogdanović
- Petar Božić
- Marko Gudurić
- Milan Gurović
- Tadija Dragićević
- Mile Ilić
- Nikola Janković
- Nikola Jokić
- Stefan Jović
- Nikola Kalinić
- Dušan Kecman
- Ognjen Kuzmić
- Nikola Lončar
- Milan Mačvan
- Boban Marjanović
- Stefan Marković
- Dejan Milojević
- Dragan Milosavljević
- Nikola Milutinov
- Luka Mitrović
- Miljan Pavković
- Kosta Perović
- Bojan Popović
- Miroslav Raduljica
- Igor Rakočević
- Aleksandar Rašić
- Duško Savanović
- Marko Simonović
- Miloš Teodosić
- Milenko Tepić
- Milenko Topić
- Uroš Tripković
- Novica Veličković
- Rade Zagorac

Slovenia

- Sani Bečirovič
- Mirza Begić
- Jaka Blažič
- Goran Dragič
- Nebojša Joksimović
- Jaka Lakovič
- Marko Milič
- Hasan Rizvić
- Uroš Slokar
- Beno Udrih
- Gašper Vidmar
- Jurij Zdovc

Turkey

- Ender Arslan
- Hüseyin Beşok
- Semih Erden
- Ermal Kurtoğlu
- Emir Preldžić

United Kingdom

- Matthew Bryan-Amaning

United States

- Alan Anderson
- Jamie Arnold
- Isaiah Austin
- Corey L. Brewer
- Elton Brown
- Vonteego Cummings
- Cade Davis
- Corsley Edwards
- Jordan Farmar
- Reggie Freeman
- James Gist
- Drew Gordon
- Jamon Gordon
- Jamont Gordon
- Marcus Goree
- Will Hatcher
- Kyle Hill
- Shawn James
- Curtis Jerrells
- Charles Jenkins
- Julius Johnson
- Keith Langford
- Acie Law
- Michael Lee
- Quincy Lewis
- Chester Mason
- Adam Morrison
- Jimmy Oliver
- Andre Owens
- Scoonie Penn
- Omar Thomas
- Torey Thomas
- Lawrence Roberts
- Rumeal Robinson
- David Simon
- Devin Smith
- Kenyan Weaks
- Marcus Williams
- Andrew Wisniewski

== See also ==
- List of current ABA Liga team rosters
- ABA League system
