= Goodyear Dunlop Sava Tires =

Tyre manufacturer in Slovenia

Sava Tires
- Type: Subsidiary
- Industry: Tyres, Rubber
- Founded: 1998; 28 years ago
- Headquarters: Kranj, Slovenia
- Parent: Goodyear Tire and Rubber Company

Goodyear Dunlop Sava Tires is a Slovenian tyre and other rubber related products' manufacturer, and a subsidiary of the Goodyear Tire and Rubber Company. It is located in Kranj, Slovenia. The company was formed in 1998 under the name Sava Tyres d.o.o., although tyre manufacturing had started in 1920. The company changed its name from Sava Tyres to Goodyear Dunlop Sava Tires in 2011. It employs over 1,400 people. It is one of the biggest and most successful Slovenian companies.

== Chronology ==
The factory's rubber products were initially sold under the Vulkan brand name. In 1931 the company was taken over by the Austrian rubber manufacturer Semperit and by the end of the 1930s various industrial and consumer products were produced from rubber, including tires.
