= Ioannis Tsimpouris =

Greek international basketball referee

- Ιωάννης Τσιμπούρης
- Born: 3 November 1993 (age 33); Greece
- Occupation: Basketball referee

Ioannis Tsimpouris (Greek: Ιωάννης Τσιμπούρης; born in 1993) is a Greek professional basketball referee who holds an international licence from the International Basketball Federation, FIBA. He has officiated in European competitions such as the Basketball Champions League and in high‑level domestic fixtures in Greece.

== Career ==
Tsimpouris began officiating in local Greek leagues and progressed through the national refereeing system. He represented the Hellenic Basketball Federation (EOK) in domestic competitions including the Greek Basket League and Greek Cup fixtures.

He was officially listed among the referees for the 2025–26 Basketball Champions League (BCL), an international club competition featuring teams from across Europe. Domestically, Tsimpouris has been appointed to officiate key Greek Cup and Basket League matches, including cup finals and also the national derby, Olympiakos vs. Panathinaikos in 2025. His involvement in the Greek top flight has contributed to his recognition among active referees in the country.

Tsimpouris holds a FIBA referee licence and has been recognised on the official list of international referees maintained by FIBA's Referee Operations division, which oversees the licensing, training and deployment of officials for international competitions.

== See also ==
- Europe BCL referees
