= 2026–27 EuroLeague =

69th season of the European premier basketball league

- Season: 2026–27
- Duration: 24 September 2026 – 16 April 2027 (Regular season); 20 & 23 April 2027 (Play-in tournament); 27 April – 12 May 2027 (Playoffs); 28 – 30 May 2027 (Final Four)
- All statistics correct as of 23 June 2026.

The 2026–27 EuroLeague is the 26th season of the modern era of the EuroLeague. Including the competition's previous incarnation as the FIBA Europe Champions Cup, this is the 69th season of the premier basketball competition for European men's clubs. The Final Four will be held at the Etihad Arena in Abu Dhabi, UAE.

Olympiacos are the defending champions.

== Teams ==
=== Team changes ===
Cosea JL Bourg won the EuroCup last season, but they will not play in the EuroLeague due to financial problems.

Monaco dropped down to the following season's EuroCup. On 26 June 2026, Beşiktaş became the 20th team as they were the runners–up in the EuroCup last season.

=== Qualified teams ===
The labels in the parentheses show how each team qualified for the place of its starting round:

Qualified teams for 2026–27 EuroLeague Licensed clubs
(Spain) Barcelona	(Greece) Olympiacos	(Turkey) Fenerbahçe	(Israel) Maccabi Tel Aviv
(Spain) Baskonia	(Greece) Panathinaikos	(France) ASVEL	(Italy) Olimpia Milano
(Spain) Real Madrid	(Turkey) Anadolu Efes	(Germany) Bayern Munich	(Lithuania) Žalgiris

Associated clubs
(Spain) Valencia Basket (3-year WC)	(Serbia) Crvena zvezda (3-year WC)	(Turkey) Beşiktaş (1-year WC)	(Israel) Hapoel Tel Aviv (EC)
(United Arab Emirates) Dubai Basketball (5-year WC)	(Serbia) Partizan (3-year WC)	(France) Paris Basketball (1-year WC)	(Italy) Virtus Bologna (3-year WC)

=== Venues and locations ===
Location of teams in 2026–27 EuroLeague
Location of teams from the Middle East in 2026–27 EuroLeague

Team	Home city	Arena	Capacity	Kit manufacturer	Last season
(Turkish Basketball Federation) Anadolu Efes	Istanbul	Basketball Development Center	10,000	GSA	19th
(Italian Basketball Federation) Armani Olimpia Milan	Milan	Unipol Forum	12,700	EA7	14th
(Spanish Basketball Federation) Barcelona	Barcelona	Palau Blaugrana	7,585	Nike	9th
(German Basketball Federation) Bayern Munich	Munich	SAP Garden	11,500	Adidas	13th
(Turkish Basketball Federation) Beşiktaş Fuzul	Istanbul	Basketball Development Center	10,000	Umbro	—
(Basketball Federation of Serbia) Crvena zvezda Meridianbet	Belgrade	Belgrade Arena	18,386	Adidas	10th
(United Arab Emirates Basketball Association) Dubai Basketball	Dubai	Coca-Cola Arena	17,000	Adidas	11th
(Turkish Basketball Federation) Fenerbahçe Tarfin	Istanbul	Ülker Sports and Event Hall	13,000	Adidas	4th
(Israeli Basketball Association) Hapoel IBI Tel Aviv	Tel Aviv	(Bulgarian Basketball Federation) Arena 8888 Sofia	12,373	Adidas	6th
(Israeli Basketball Association) Hapoel IBI Tel Aviv	Tel Aviv	(Bulgarian Basketball Federation) Arena Botevgrad	4,500	Adidas	6th
(Spanish Basketball Federation) Kosner Baskonia	Vitoria-Gasteiz	Buesa Arena	15,431	Macron	18th
(French Federation of Basketball) LDLC ASVEL	Décines-Charpieu	LDLC Arena	12,523	Adidas	20th
(French Federation of Basketball) LDLC ASVEL	Villeurbanne	Astroballe	5,556	Adidas	20th
(Israeli Basketball Association) Maccabi Rapyd Tel Aviv	Tel Aviv			Adidas	12th
(Hellenic Basketball Federation) Olympiacos	Piraeus	Peace and Friendship Stadium	12,300	Nike	1st place, gold medalist(s)
(Hellenic Basketball Federation) Panathinaikos AKTOR	Athens	Telekom Center Athens	19,250	Adidas	7th
(French Federation of Basketball) Paris Basketball	Paris	Adidas Arena	8,000	Adidas	16th
(French Federation of Basketball) Paris Basketball	Paris	Accor Arena	15,705	Adidas	16th
(Basketball Federation of Serbia) Partizan Mozzart Bet	Belgrade	Belgrade Arena	18,386	Nike	15th
(Spanish Basketball Federation) Real Madrid	Madrid	Movistar Arena	15,000	Adidas	2nd place, silver medalist(s)
(Spain) Valencia Basket	Valencia	Roig Arena	15,600	Luanvi	3rd place, bronze medalist(s)
(Italian Basketball Federation) Virtus Bologna	Bologna	Unipol Hall	11,000	Adidas	17th
(Italian Basketball Federation) Virtus Bologna	Bologna	PalaDozza	5,570	Adidas	17th
(Lithuanian Basketball Federation) Žalgiris	Kaunas	Žalgirio Arena	15,415	Puma	5th

=== Referees ===
A total of 82 Euroleague Basketball officials were set to work on the 2026–27 season in EuroLeague and EuroCup:

- (Basketball Belgium) Nick van den Broeck
- (Basketball Federation of Bosnia and Herzegovina) Dragan Porobić
- (Croatian Basketball Federation) Denis Hadžić
- (Croatian Basketball Federation) Franko Gracin
- (Croatian Basketball Federation) Josip Radojković
- (Croatian Basketball Federation) Luka Kardum
- (Croatian Basketball Federation) Marko Mustapić
- (Croatian Basketball Federation) Tomislav Hordov
- (Czech Basketball Federation) Jaroslav Pazourek
- (Czech Basketball Federation) Robert Vyklický
- (Estonian Basketball Association) Rain Peerandi
- (Basketball Finland) Karol Kowalski
- (French Federation of Basketball) Christopher Lemaire
- (French Federation of Basketball) Hugues Thépénier
- (French Federation of Basketball) Joseph Bissang
- (French Federation of Basketball) Maxime Boubert
- (French Federation of Basketball) Mehdi Difallah
- (French Federation of Basketball) Thomas Bissuel
- (German Basketball Federation) Anne Panther
- (German Basketball Federation) Christian Theis
- (German Basketball Federation) Dogu Berk Innal
- (German Basketball Federation) Gentian Cici
- (German Basketball Federation) Robert Lottermoser
- (German Basketball Federation) Steve Bittner
- (British Basketball) Eduard Udyanskyy
- (Hellenic Basketball Federation) Ioannis Foufis
- (Hellenic Basketball Federation) Ioannis Tiganis
- (Hellenic Basketball Federation) Ioannis Tsimpouris
- (Hellenic Basketball Federation) Vassilis Pitsilkas
- (Hellenic Basketball Federation) Vasiliki Tsaroucha
- (Israeli Basketball Association) Adar Peer
- (Israeli Basketball Association) Amit Balak
- (Israeli Basketball Association) Noam Gordon
- (Israeli Basketball Association) Seffi Shemmesh
- (Italian Basketball Federation) Edoardo Gonella
- (Italian Basketball Federation) Guido Giovannetti
- (Italian Basketball Federation) Manuel Attard
- (Italian Basketball Federation) Matteo Lucotti
- (Italian Basketball Federation) Michele Rossi
- (Latvian Basketball Association) Kristaps Konstantinovs
- (Latvian Basketball Association) Oļegs Latiševs
- (Lithuanian Basketball Federation) Artūras Šukys
- (Lithuanian Basketball Federation) Dovydas Kairys
- (Lithuanian Basketball Federation) Gytis Vilius
- (Lithuanian Basketball Federation) Ignas Jablonskas
- (Basketball Federation of Montenegro) Igor Dragojević
- (Basketball Federation of Montenegro) Miloš Koljenšić
- (Basketball Federation of Montenegro) Vojislav Lepetić
- (Polish Basketball Federation) Jakub Zamojski
- (Polish Basketball Federation) Marcin Kowalski
- (Polish Basketball Federation) Piotr Pastusiak
- (Polish Basketball Federation) Tomasz Trawicki
- (Portuguese Basketball Federation) Leandro Lezcano
- (Portuguese Basketball Federation) Sérgio Silva
- (Basketball Federation of Serbia) Ilija Belošević
- (Basketball Federation of Serbia) Marko Juras
- (Basketball Federation of Serbia) Milivoje Jovčić
- (Basketball Federation of Serbia) Stefan Ćalić
- (Basketball Federation of Serbia) Uroš Obrknežević
- (Basketball Federation of Slovenia) Damir Javor
- (Basketball Federation of Slovenia) Mario Majkić
- (Basketball Federation of Slovenia) Milan Nedović
- (Basketball Federation of Slovenia) Saša Pukl
- (Basketball Federation of Slovenia) Sašo Petek
- (Spanish Basketball Federation) Alberto Baena
- (Spanish Basketball Federation) Alberto Sanchez Sixto
- (Spanish Basketball Federation) Arnau Padrós
- (Spanish Basketball Federation) Carlos Cortés
- (Spanish Basketball Federation) Carlos Peruga
- (Spanish Basketball Federation) Emilio Pérez
- (Spanish Basketball Federation) Joaquin Garcia
- (Spanish Basketball Federation) Jordi Aliaga
- (Spanish Basketball Federation) Juan Carlos García
- (Spanish Basketball Federation) Sergio Manuel
- (Swedish Basketball Federation) Saulius Račys
- (Turkish Basketball Federation) Can Mavisu
- (Turkish Basketball Federation) Çisil Güngör
- (Turkish Basketball Federation) Emin Moğulkoç
- (Turkish Basketball Federation) Hüseyin Çelik
- (Turkish Basketball Federation) Kerem Baki
- (Turkish Basketball Federation) Tolga Akkuşoğlu
- (Basketball Federation of Ukraine) Borys Ryzhyk

== Regular season ==
The regular season will begin on 24 September 2026 and conclude on 16 April 2027. The 20 teams will play against each other home-and-away in a round-robin format over 38 rounds where only 10 teams will advance to the postseason. Moreover, the top six teams from regular season will receive a bye to the playoffs, while the teams placed from 7th to 10th will participate in the play-in to get the last two playoff spots. At the tail end of the standings, teams placed from 11th to 20th will be eliminated after the regular season.

=== League table ===
Pos	Team	Pld	W	L	PF	PA	PD	Qualification
1	(Spanish Basketball Federation) Valencia Basket	13	10	3	1221	1117	+104	Qualification to playoffs
2	(Hellenic Basketball Federation) Olympiacos	13	10	3	1122	1031	+91	Qualification to playoffs
3	(Hellenic Basketball Federation) Panathinaikos AKTOR	13	9	4	1102	1008	+94	Qualification to playoffs
4	(United Arab Emirates Basketball Association) Dubai Basketball	13	9	4	1112	1091	+21	Qualification to playoffs
5	(Turkish Basketball Federation) Fenerbahçe Tarfin	13	8	5	1080	1005	+75	Qualification to playoffs
6	(Basketball Federation of Serbia) Crvena zvezda Meridianbet	13	8	5	1071	1021	+50	Qualification to playoffs
7	(Spanish Basketball Federation) Barcelona	13	8	5	1149	1122	+27	Qualification to play-in
8	(Lithuanian Basketball Federation) Žalgiris	13	8	5	1115	1094	+21	Qualification to play-in
9	(Spanish Basketball Federation) Real Madrid	13	7	6	1227	1152	+75	Qualification to play-in
10	(Israeli Basketball Association) Hapoel IBI Tel Aviv	13	7	6	1175	1138	+37	Qualification to play-in
11	(Basketball Federation of Serbia) Partizan Mozzart Bet	13	7	6	1005	1001	+4	
12	(French Federation of Basketball) Paris Basketball	13	7	6	1168	1200	−32	
13	(Turkish Basketball Federation) Anadolu Efes	13	6	7	1127	1123	+4	
14	(Turkish Basketball Federation) Beşiktaş	13	6	7	1132	1156	−24	
15	(Italian Basketball Federation) Virtus Bologna	13	5	8	1118	1169	−51	
16	(German Basketball Federation) Bayern Munich	13	4	9	1156	1229	−73	
17	(French Federation of Basketball) LDLC ASVEL	13	4	9	1136	1247	−111	
18	(Italian Basketball Federation) Armani Olimpia Milan	13	3	10	1063	1129	−66	
19	(Israeli Basketball Association) Maccabi Rapyd Tel Aviv	13	3	10	1083	1175	−92	
20	(Spanish Basketball Federation) Kosner Baskonia	13	1	12	1042	1196	−154	

Updated to match(es) played on 20 November 2026. Source: EuroLeague
Rules for classification: Regular season tiebreakers

== Awards ==
All official awards of the 2026–27 EuroLeague.

=== MVP of the Round ===
Regular season

Round	Player	Team	PIR	Ref.
1	(South Sudan) Carlik Jones	(Basketball Federation of Serbia) Partizan Mozzart Bet	33	
2	(United States) Elijah Bryant	(Israeli Basketball Association) Hapoel IBI Tel Aviv	31	
3	(United States) Elijah Bryant (2)	(Israeli Basketball Association) Hapoel IBI Tel Aviv	40	
4	(France) Mathias Lessort	(Hellenic Basketball Federation) Panathinaikos AKTOR	30	
5	(Dominican Republic) Jean Montero	(Hellenic Basketball Federation) Olympiacos	35	
6	(Bulgaria) Sasha Vezenkov	(Hellenic Basketball Federation) Olympiacos	38	
7	(Azerbaijan) Zach LeDay	(Israeli Basketball Association) Hapoel IBI Tel Aviv	33	
7	(North Macedonia) T. J. Shorts	(Spanish Basketball Federation) Valencia Basket	33	
8	(United States) Antonio Blakeney	(Israeli Basketball Association) Hapoel IBI Tel Aviv	35	
8	(United States) Elijah Bryant (3)	(Israeli Basketball Association) Hapoel IBI Tel Aviv	35	
9	(United States) Lonnie Walker IV	(Turkish Basketball Federation) Beşiktaş	36	
10	(France) Nadir Hifi	(French Federation of Basketball) Paris Basketball	39	
11	(Lithuania) Jonas Valančiūnas	(Lithuanian Basketball Federation) Žalgiris	36	
12	(Bulgaria) Sasha Vezenkov (2)	(Hellenic Basketball Federation) Olympiacos	41	
13	(North Macedonia) Moses Wright	(Italian Basketball Federation) Armani Olimpia Milan	36	

=== MVP of the Month ===
Month	Round	Player	Team	Ref.
2026
October	1–9	(North Macedonia) T. J. Shorts	(Spanish Basketball Federation) Valencia Basket	

== Attendances ==
Pos	Team	Total	High	Low	Average	Change
1	(Hellenic Basketball Federation) Panathinaikos AKTOR	136,326	19,073	14,633	17,041	−8.2%
2	(Lithuanian Basketball Federation) Žalgiris	30,400	15,267	15,133	15,200	+2.2%
3	(Basketball Federation of Serbia) Crvena zvezda Meridianbet	44,748	16,420	14,081	14,916	−16.7%
4	(Basketball Federation of Serbia) Partizan Mozzart Bet	13,783	13,783	13,783	13,783	−9.8%
5	(Spanish Basketball Federation) Valencia Basket	23,006	12,156	10,850	11,503	−9.1%
6	(German Basketball Federation) Bayern Munich	21,874	11,500	10,374	10,937	+0.7%
7	(Spanish Basketball Federation) Real Madrid	8,579	8,579	8,579	8,579	−4.5%
8	(Turkish Basketball Federation) Fenerbahçe Tarfin	25,480	8,850	8,133	8,493	−16.0%
9	(Turkish Basketball Federation) Anadolu Efes	8,087	8,087	8,087	8,087	+21.3%
10	(French Federation of Basketball) LDLC ASVEL	15,230	8,125	7,105	7,615	+1.0%
11	(Spanish Basketball Federation) Kosner Baskonia	21,482	7,351	6,848	7,161	−18.0%
12	(Italian Basketball Federation) EA7 Emporio Armani Milan	6,950	6,950	6,950	6,950	+16.1%
13	(Turkish Basketball Federation) Beşiktaş	13,603	8,500	5,103	6,802	n/a^{1}
14	(United Arab Emirates Basketball Association) Dubai Basketball	19,852	7,313	5,270	6,617	+13.0%
15	(Hellenic Basketball Federation) Olympiacos	5,935	5,935	5,935	5,935	−51.6%
16	(French Federation of Basketball) Paris Basketball	16,054	6,628	3,746	5,351	−24.1%
17	(Italian Basketball Federation) Virtus Bologna	5,167	5,167	5,167	5,167	−23.5%
18	(Spanish Basketball Federation) Barcelona	9,967	5,621	4,346	4,984	−9.6%
19	(Israeli Basketball Association) Hapoel IBI Tel Aviv	2,000	2,000	2,000	2,000	−59.8%
20	(Israeli Basketball Association) Maccabi Rapyd Tel Aviv	681	427	254	341	−89.8%
	League total					n/a

Source: EuroLeague
Notes:
1: Team did not participate in the previous EuroLeague season.

== See also ==
- 2026 EuroLeague SuperCup
- 2026–27 EuroCup Basketball
- 2026–27 Basketball Champions League
- 2026–27 FIBA Europe Cup
