= Chester Mason =

American professional basketball player (born 1981)

Personal information
- Born: April 25, 1981 (age 45) Cleveland, Ohio, U.S.
- Listed height: 1.93 m (6 ft 4 in)

Career information
- High school: South (Cleveland, Ohio)
- College: Miami (Ohio) (2001–2005)
- NBA draft: 2005: undrafted
- Playing career: 2005–2014
- Position: Guard

Career history

Playing
- 2005: Fenerbahçe
- 2006: Los Angeles D-Fenders
- 2007: Cleveland Cavaliers
- 2007: Zlatorog Laško
- 2008: Anaheim Arsenal
- 2009: Široki
- 2010: Široki
- 2011: Ventspils
- 2012: Zadar
- 2013: Bnei HaSharon
- 2013: STB Le Havre
- 2014: Novosibirsk

Coaching
- 2015–present: Brush HS

Career highlights
- Russian Super League First Team (2014); Bosnian League MVP (2010); Adriatic League MVP (2010); 2× Bosnian League Finals MVP (2009, 2010); 2× Bosnian League champion (2009, 2010); First-team All-MAC (2005); MAC Defensive Player Of The Year (2005); Co-Ohio Mr. Basketball (2000)

Chester Chet Mason (born April 25, 1981) is an American former professional basketball player. He is a 1,93 (6 ft 4in) tall guard who last played for BC Novosibirsk of the Russian Basketball Super League. Mason was named the Adriatic League MVP in the 2009–10 season, while he was playing for Široki averaging 19.9 points per game.

== College ==
Mason made 117 career starts for the Miami RedHawks under Coach Charlie Coles, the program’s second-most all-time. He and Ron Harper are the program’s only players to compile over 1,200 points, 800 rebounds, 300 assists and 150 steals in a career. Mason’s 806 career rebounds rank first among Miami’s guards. Mason was named the MAC Defensive Player of the Year and the RedHawks’ Male Co-Athlete of the Year in 2005. He was a first-team All-MAC selection that season when he led Miami to a regular-season league title and NIT berth.
