= Andreja =

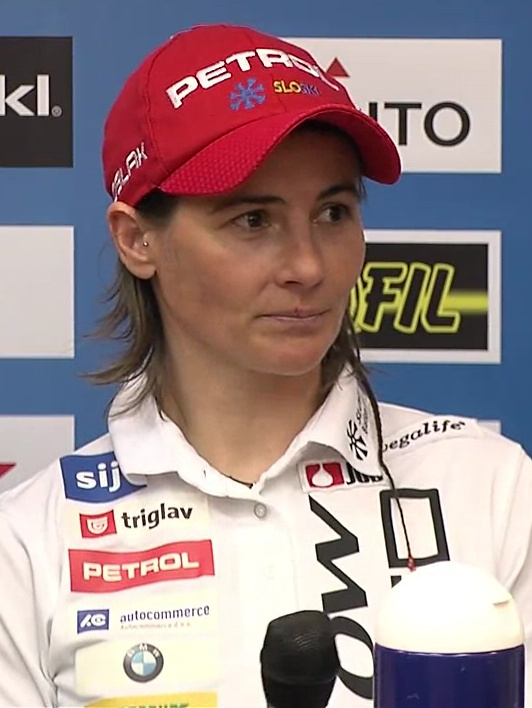
Andreja Mali (born 1977), former Slovenian biathlete and former cross-country skier

Andreja (Serbian: Андреја) is a given name. Notable people with the name include:

- Andreja Apostolović (born 1996), Serbian football midfielder
- Andreja Efremov (born 1992), Macedonian footballer
- Andreja Gomboc (born 1969), Slovenian astrophysicist
- Andreja Katič (born 1969), Minister of Justice of the Republic of Slovenia
- Andreja Klepač (born 1986), professional Slovenian tennis player
- Andreja Koblar (née Grašič), (born 1971), former Slovenian biathlete
- Andreja Kojić (1896–1952), Serbian footballer
- Andreja Kulunčić (born 1968), Croatian artist, living and working in Zagreb, Croatia
- Andreja Lazović (born 1994), Serbian footballer
- Andreja Leskovšek (born 1965), Slovenian former Olympic alpine skier
- Andreja Mali (born 1977), former Slovenian biathlete and former cross-country skier
- Andreja Marinković (born 1965), Serbian athlete
- Andreja Milutinović (born 1990), Serbian professional basketball player
- Andreja Mladenović (born 1975), politician in Serbia
- Andreja Mrnjavčević, 14th-century Serbian noble who governed the region of Prilep 1371–1395
- Andreja Nikl (born 1985), Slovenian football defender
- Andreja Pejić (born 1991), Bosnian-Australian model
- Andreja Preger (1912–2015), Austro-Hungarian-born pianist & Holocaust survivor
- Andreja Smrekar (born 1967), Slovenian cross-country skier
- Andreja Stevanović (born 1995), Serbian professional basketball player

== See also ==
- Gymnázium Andreja Vrábla Levice, gymnasium located in Levice, Slovakia
- Gymnazium Andreja Vrabla, gymnasium located in Levice, Slovakia
- Andrey
- Andrea
- Andrija
