= Andrija =

Andrija (pronounced [ǎndrija]; Serbian Cyrillic: Андрија) is a South Slavic masculine given name. It is cognate to Greek Andreas, or English Andrew.

Notable people with the name include:

- Andrija, Prince of Hum (fl. 1203–50), medieval nobleman from the Vukanović dynasty
- Andrija Ljudevit Adamić (1766–1828), Austrian-Croatian merchant
- Andrija Aleši (1425–1505), Venetian Dalmatian architect and sculptor
- Andrija Anković (1937–1980), Yugoslav footballer and manager
- Andrija Artuković (1899–1988), Croatian fascist politician
- Andrija Balajić (born 1972), Croatian footballer
- Andrija Balić (born 1997), Croatian footballer
- Andrija Bojić (born 1993), Serbian basketballer
- Andrija Bošnjak (born 1996), Croatian footballer
- Andrija Torkvat Brlić (1826–1868), Croatian writer, linguist and politician
- Andrija Bulatović (born 2006), Montenegrin footballer
- Andrija Buvina (13th century), Croatian sculptor and painter
- Andrija Crnogorac (born 1981), Serbian basketball player
- Andrija Čikić (2009–2023), victim of the Belgrade school shooting
- Andrija Delibašić (1981-2025), Montenegrin footballer
- Andrija Dragojević (born 1991), Montenegrin footballer
- Andrija Dudić (1533–1589), Hungarian nobleman of Croatian and Italian origin
- Andrija Fuderer (1931–2011), Croatian–Belgian chess player
- Andrija Gavrilović (born 1965), Serbian-Italian basketball coach
- Andrija Gerić (born 1977), Serbian volleyball player
- Andrija Gropa (fl. 14th c.), medieval nobleman from the Gropa family
- Andrija Hebrang (politician, born 1899) (died 1949), Croatian politician
- Andrija Hebrang (politician, born 1946), Croatian politician and son of the above
- Andrija Jelavić (born 2004), Croatian basketball player, 2022–23 PAOK FC season
- Andrija Jukic (born 1987), Australian footballer
- Andrija Kačić Miošić (1704–1760), Croatian poet and Franciscan friar
- Andrija Kaluđerović (born 1987), Serbian footballer
- Andrija Knego (born 1956), Croatian basketball
- Andrija Komadina (born 1977), Croatian water polo player
- Andrija Konc (1919–1945), Croatian singer
- Andrija Stane Krstulović (1929–2012), Croatian football player and manager
- Andrija Kujundžić (1899–1970), Croatian footballer
- Andrija Lompar (born 1956), Montenegrin politician
- Andrija Luburić (1891–1944), Serbian historian and folklorist
- Andrija Luković (born 1994), Serbian footballer
- Andrija Majdevac (born 1997), Serbian footballer
- Andrija Mandić (born 1965), Montenegrin politician
- Andrija Marković (c. 1400 – after 1438), builder and stonemason from Korčula and Dubrovnik
- Andrija Maurović (1901–1981), Yugoslav comics artist
- Andrija Medulić (c. 1510/15–1563), Italian Renaissance painter and etcher born in Dalmatia
- Andrija Milošević (born 1978), Serbian actor and television host
- Andrija Mohorovičić (1857–1936), Croatian meteorologist and seismologist
- Andrija Mutafelija (1883–1970), Croatian footballer
- Andrija Novakovich (born 1996), American professional soccer player
- Andrija Otenhajmer (1926–1999), Yugoslav runner
- Andrija Paltašić (1440–1500), Venetian printer from Kotor
- Andrija Pavlović (born 1993), Serbian footballer
- Andrija Pavlović (musician), Serbian-Dutch pianist
- Andrija Popović (born 1959), Montenegrin politician and former water polo goalkeeper
- Andrija Prlainović (born 1987), Serbian water polo player
- Andrija Puharich (1918–1995), American medical and parapsychological researcher of Croatian descent
- Andrija Radenić (1913–2012), Serbian historian and writer
- Andrija Radović (1872–1947) Yugoslav politician
- Andrija Raičević (c. 1610 – after 1673), Serbian iconographer and miniaturist
- Andrija Radulović (poet), Montenegrin poet (born 1970)
- Andrija Radulović (footballer), Montenegrin football player (born 2002)
- Andrija Ratković (born 1997), Serbian footballer
- Andrija Simović (born 1995), Serbian basketballer
- Andrija Stipanović, Bosnian Croat basketballer
- Andrija Šimić (1833–1905), Herzegovinian hajduk
- Andrija Šljukić (born 1995), Serbian rower
- Andrija Štampar (1888–1958), Croatian health expert
- Andrija Vlahović (born 1991), Croatian water polo player
- Andrija Vukčević (born 1996), Montenegrin footballer
- Andrija Vuković, Croatian handballer
- Andrija Zmajević (1628–1694), Serbian-Venetian Baroque poet
- Andrija Zlatić (born 1978), Serbian sports shooter
- Andrija Živković (born 1996), Serbian footballer
- Andrija Žižić (born 1980), Croatian basketballer

== See also ==
- Sveti Andrija (disambiguation) ("Saint Andrew")
- Andrija Kojić, real name Andreja
- Andreja
- Andrej
- Andro (given name)
