= KK Partizan all-time roster =

The following is a list of players, both past and current, who appeared at least in one game for KK Partizan.

== A ==
Player	Nationality	Number	Position	From	To
Angola, Braian	(Colombia)	0	F	2020	
Akognon, Josh	(United States)	2	G	2015	
Aleksić, Vukašin	(Serbia)	14	G	2008	2009
Allman Jr., Kyle	(Montenegro)		SG	2026	
Andrić, Mihajlo	(Serbia)	4 · 19	F	2012	2018
Androić, Vladimir	(Socialist Federal Republic of Yugoslavia)	4	G	1989	1990
Anđušić, Danilo	(Serbia)	33	G	2011; 2015; 2022	2012; 2015; 2024
Aranitović, Aleksandar	(Serbia)	7	G	2017	2019
Aranitović, Petar	(Serbia)	5	G	2013	2016
Arnerić, Slavko	(Socialist Federal Republic of Yugoslavia)			1946	1949
Avdalović, Vule	(Serbia and Montenegro)	14	G	1997	2005
Avramović, Aleksa	(Serbia)	4	G	2021	2024

== B ==
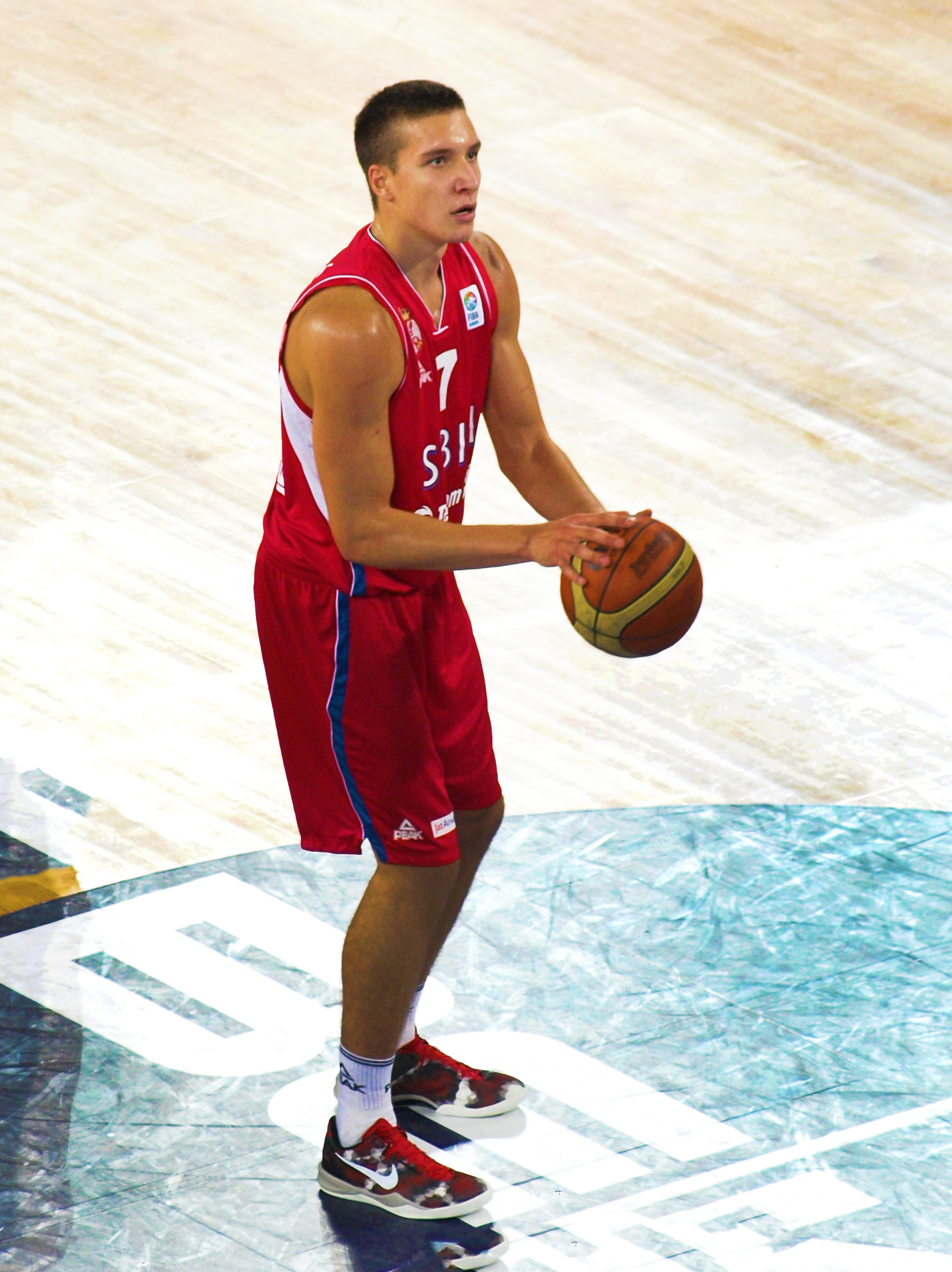
Bogdan Bogdanović was most contributed for 13th consecutive Serbian League title. He exploded in the finals series, averaging 30.8 points, 4.8 rebounds, and 4.2 assists per game

Player	Nationality	Number	Position	From	To
Babić, Milenko	(Socialist Federal Republic of Yugoslavia)			1974	1979
Bakić, Boris	(Montenegro)	22 · 11 · 8	G	2004	2007
Balaban, Darko	(Serbia)	22	C	2007	2010
Beravs, Boris	(Socialist Federal Republic of Yugoslavia)			1970	1979
Berić, Miroslav	(Serbia and Montenegro)	9	G	1990; 2000	1997; 2001
Bertāns, Dāvis	(Latvia)	44	F	2011	2014
Bešović, Nemanja	(Serbia)	18	C	2008	2012
Bezbradica, Nemanja	(Serbia)	33	F	2013	2015
Birčević, Stefan	(Serbia)	14	PF	2016; 2017	2019; 2020
Blagojević, Milan	(Socialist Federal Republic of Yugoslavia)			1951	1956
Bogdanović, Bogdan	(Serbia)	13	G	2010	2014
Bogdanović, Luka	(Serbia)	5 · 35	F	2004; 2014	2007; 2015
Bogojević, Milovan	(Socialist Federal Republic of Yugoslavia)			1970	1971
Bogojević, Vladimir	(Germany)	4	G	2000	2001
Bojić, Predrag	(Socialist Federal Republic of Yugoslavia)			1977	1979
Bojović, Miloš	(Socialist Federal Republic of Yugoslavia)			1957	1969
Bonga, Isaac	(Germany)	17	F	2024	2026
Borovnjak, Dejan	(Serbia)	16 · 10	C	2004	2008
Bosanac, Vladimir	(Socialist Federal Republic of Yugoslavia)			1988	1989
Bošnjaković, Mitar	(Serbia)	8	SF	2024	2026
Božić, Petar	(Serbia)	6 · 20	G	2004	2012
Božović, Slobodan	(Serbia and Montenegro)	11 · 9	F	2003	2005
Brimah, Amida	(Ghana)	37	C	2018	
Brkić, Haris	(Serbia and Montenegro)	5 · 4	G	1993; 2000	1999; 2001
Brodziansky, Vladimír	(Slovakia)	12	F/C	2023	
Brown, Anthony	(United States)	21	F	2018	
Brown, Gerald	(United States)	15 · 32	G	2003; 2005	2004; 2006
Brown, Sterling	(United States)	12	G/F	2024	2026
Bugarčić, Milenko	(Socialist Federal Republic of Yugoslavia)			1984	1985
Bukumirović, Nebojša	(Socialist Federal Republic of Yugoslavia)			1980	1984
Bulatović, Nikola	(Serbia and Montenegro)	13	C	1994; 2000	1995; 2001
Burazer, Milenko	(Socialist Federal Republic of Yugoslavia)			1971	

== C ==
Player	Nationality	Number	Position	From	To
Čakarević, Marko	(Serbia)	22 · 24	F	2011; 2017	2013; 2018
Ćakić, Goran	(Serbia and Montenegro)	11	F	2003	2004
Calathes, Nick	(Greece)	33	PG	2025	2026
Čanak, Nenad	(Serbia and Montenegro)	10 · 15	F	1993; 1999	1994; 2003
Čekovský, Michal	(Slovakia)		F	2011	2013
Čermak, Dragutin	(Socialist Federal Republic of Yugoslavia)			1969	1973
Čolović, Đorđe	(Socialist Federal Republic of Yugoslavia)			1956	1961
Caboclo, Bruno	(Brazil)	50	F/C	2023	2024
Cornell, Peter	(United States)	16	C	2001	2002
Cotič, Ljubomil	(Socialist Federal Republic of Yugoslavia)			1949	1950
Cotton, Scheavalie	(United States)	4	G	2000	2001
Crnogorac, Andrija	(Serbia and Montenegro)			1997	1999
Čubrilo, Aleksandar	(Serbia and Montenegro)	7	F	1993	2001
Cummings, Vonteego	(United States)	25	G	2005	2007
Ćurčić, Borislav	(Socialist Federal Republic of Yugoslavia)	14	G	1958	1965
Cvetković, Aleksandar	(Serbia)	4	G	2015	2016
Cvjetićanin, Danko	(Socialist Federal Republic of Yugoslavia)	12		1980	1985

== D ==
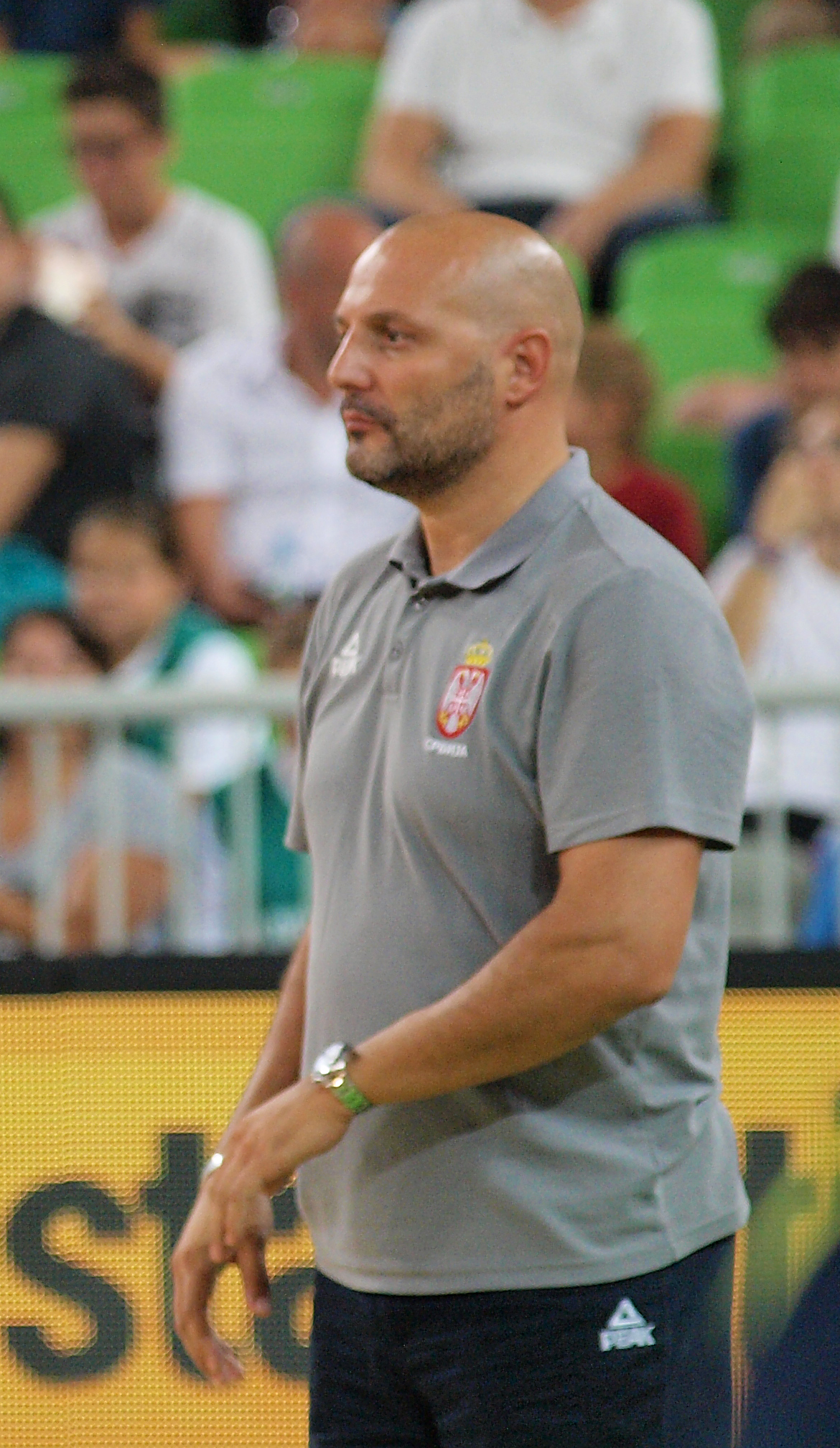
Aleksandar Đorđević scored a game-winning, buzzer-beatering three-pointer in 1992 Final in Istanbul

Player	Nationality	Number	Position	From	To
Dalipagić, Davorin	(Serbia and Montenegro)	6	F	1995	1996
Dalipagić, Dražen	(Socialist Federal Republic of Yugoslavia)	15	F	1971; 1981	1980; 1982
Dallo, Boris	(France)	10	G	2013	2015
Damjanović, Branko	(Socialist Federal Republic of Yugoslavia)			1959	1967
Danilović, Uroš	(Serbia)	44	G	2025	
Danilović, Predrag	(Socialist Federal Republic of Yugoslavia)	5	G	1988	1992
Dangubić, Nemanja	(Serbia)	6	SF	2020	2022
Davies, Brandon	(Uganda)	0	C	2024	2025
Đekić, Branislav	(Serbia)	31	F	2009	2013
Despotović, Goran	(Socialist Federal Republic of Yugoslavia)			1980	1983
Dimitrijević, Cican	(Socialist Federal Republic of Yugoslavia)			1954	1957
Dimitrijević, Aleksa	(Serbia)	27	F/C	2024	2025
Divac, Vlade	(Socialist Federal Republic of Yugoslavia)	12	C	1986	1989
Đokić, Vladimir	(Serbia and Montenegro)	4	G	1997	2000
Đorđević, Aleksandar	(Socialist Federal Republic of Yugoslavia)	4	G	1984	1992
Đorđević, Miroljub	(Socialist Federal Republic of Yugoslavia)			1970	1971
Đorđević, Mladen	(Serbia)	5	G	2012	2013
Dozet, Milan	(Serbia and Montenegro)	6	F	1996	1998
Dozier, Perry	(United States)	35	G/F	2023	2024
Dragićević, Aleksandar	(Socialist Federal Republic of Yugoslavia)			1983	1985
Dragićević, Strahinja	(Serbia and Montenegro)	15	F	2005	2006
Dragutinović, Vladimir	(Serbia and Montenegro)	6 · 14		1984; 1991	1987; 1993
Drechsel, Trey	(United States)	55	SG	2020	2022
Drezgić, Savo	(Serbia)	3	G	2023	2024
Drobnjak, Predrag	(Montenegro)	14 · 18	C	1992; 2006	1998; 2007
Dujković, Božidar	(Socialist Federal Republic of Yugoslavia)			1966	1967
Đukić, Dragan	(Socialist Federal Republic of Yugoslavia)			1971	1976
Đumić, Božo	(Serbia)	14	C	2015	2016
Đurić, Milorad	(Socialist Federal Republic of Yugoslavia)			1955	1963
Đurić, Zvonimir	(Socialist Federal Republic of Yugoslavia)			1955	1963
Đurković, Marko	(Serbia)	15 · 17	F	2006	2008
Đurović, Nikola	(Serbia)	25	C	2026	
Duvnjak, Uroš	(Serbia and Montenegro)	21	G	2004	2005
Džakula, Zoran	(Socialist Federal Republic of Yugoslavia)			1967	1970

== E ==
Player	Nationality	Number	Position	From	To
Edwards, Damond	(United States)	23	G	2005	2006
Engler, Lajoš	(Socialist Federal Republic of Yugoslavia)			1949	1954
Erden, Semih	(Turkey)	15	C	2004	2005
Exum, Dante	(Australia)	11	PG	2022	2023

== F ==
Player	Nationality	Number	Position	From	To
Farčić, Josip	(Socialist Federal Republic of Yugoslavia)			1967	1977
Fernando, Bruno	(Angola)	24	C	2025	2026
Frimerman, Andrija	(Socialist Federal Republic of Yugoslavia)			1950	1954

== G ==
Player	Nationality	Number	Position	From	To
Gagić, Đorđe	(Serbia)	14 · 41	C	2012; 2017	2015; 2019
Gajić, Aleksandar	(Serbia and Montenegro)	6 · 7	G	2000	2002
Gavanski, Kosta	(Socialist Federal Republic of Yugoslavia)			1961	1963
Gavrilović, Strahinja	(Serbia)	17	F	2017	2018
Gegić, Amar	(Bosnia and Herzegovina)	11	G	2018	2019
Gilić, Aleksandar	(Serbia and Montenegro)	9	C	1998	1999
Gist, James	(United States)	21	F	2010	2011
Glas, Gregor	(Slovenia)	24	SG	2021	2022
Gligorijević, Ninoslav	(Socialist Federal Republic of Yugoslavia)			1958	
Glintić, Aleksandar	(Serbia and Montenegro)	11	F	1992; 2000	1994; 2002
Glišić, Miloš	(Serbia)	24	F	2014	2016
Glogovac, Mirko	(Socialist Federal Republic of Yugoslavia)			1967	1970
Goljović, Miljan	(Serbia and Montenegro)			1992	1993
Gordić, Nemanja	(Bosnia and Herzegovina)	10	G	2012	2013
Gordon, Drew	(United States)	32	F · C	2012	2013
Gordon, Jamont	(United States)	44	SG	2017	
Grba, Ranko	(Socialist Federal Republic of Yugoslavia)			1950	
Grbović, Goran	(Socialist Federal Republic of Yugoslavia)	9	F	1981	1988
Gurović, Milan	(Serbia and Montenegro)	51	G · F	2004	2005

== H ==
Player	Nationality	Number	Position	From	To
Hayes, Kevarrius	(Central African Republic)	13	C	2026	
Hatcher, Will	(United States)	25	PG	2016	2017
House, Fred	(United States)	5	G · F	2002	2004

== I ==
Player	Nationality	Number	Position	From	To
Ignjatović, Obrad	(Socialist Federal Republic of Yugoslavia)			1986	1988
Ilievski, Vlado	(North Macedonia)	6	G	1998	2001
Iljadica, Zvonko	(Socialist Federal Republic of Yugoslavia)			1970	1972
Ivančević, Milan	(Socialist Federal Republic of Yugoslavia)			1983	1984
Ivanović, Aleksandar	(Socialist Federal Republic of Yugoslavia)			1992	1993
Ivanović, Marko	(Socialist Federal Republic of Yugoslavia)		PF	1989	1991

== J ==
Player	Nationality	Number	Position	From	To
James, Dominic	(United States)	23	G	2011	2012
Janićijević, Dušan	(Socialist Federal Republic of Yugoslavia)			1960	
Janjić, Jovan	(Socialist Federal Republic of Yugoslavia)			1964	1970
Janjić, Ljuba	(Socialist Federal Republic of Yugoslavia)			1967	1968
Janković, Nikola	(Serbia)	1 · 21	C	2018	2021
Janković, Stefan	(Serbia)	33 · 8	F	2018	2021
Janković, Blagoje	(Socialist Federal Republic of Yugoslavia)			1962	1970
Jaramaz, Nemanja	(Serbia)	10	G	2010	2012
Jaramaz, Ognjen	(Serbia)	10	G	2019; 2023	2021; 2024
Jawai, Nathan	(Australia)	15	C	2010	2011
Jekiri, Tonye	(Nigeria)	23	C	2026	
Jelić, Slobodan	(Socialist Federal Republic of Yugoslavia)			1964	1972
Jelesijević, Nemanja	(Serbia and Montenegro)			1999	2000
Jerrells, Curtis	(United States)	5	G	2010	2011
Jošilo, Marko	(Serbia)	8	G	2010	2011
Jones, Carlik	(South Sudan)	2	PG	2024	
Jones, Kevin	(United States)	6	F · C	2015	2016
Jones, Tyrique	(United States)	88	F/C	2024	2026
Jovanović, Đorđije	(Montenegro)	14 · 13	G	2021	2024
Jovanović, Ivan	(Socialist Federal Republic of Yugoslavia)			1949	1957
Jovanović, Ljubiša	(Socialist Federal Republic of Yugoslavia)			1983	1985
Jovanović, Marko	(Serbia and Montenegro)		C	2000	2001
Jovanović, Slobodan	(Serbia)	8	SG	2016	2018
Jović, Vujadin	(Socialist Federal Republic of Yugoslavia)			1988	1989

== K ==
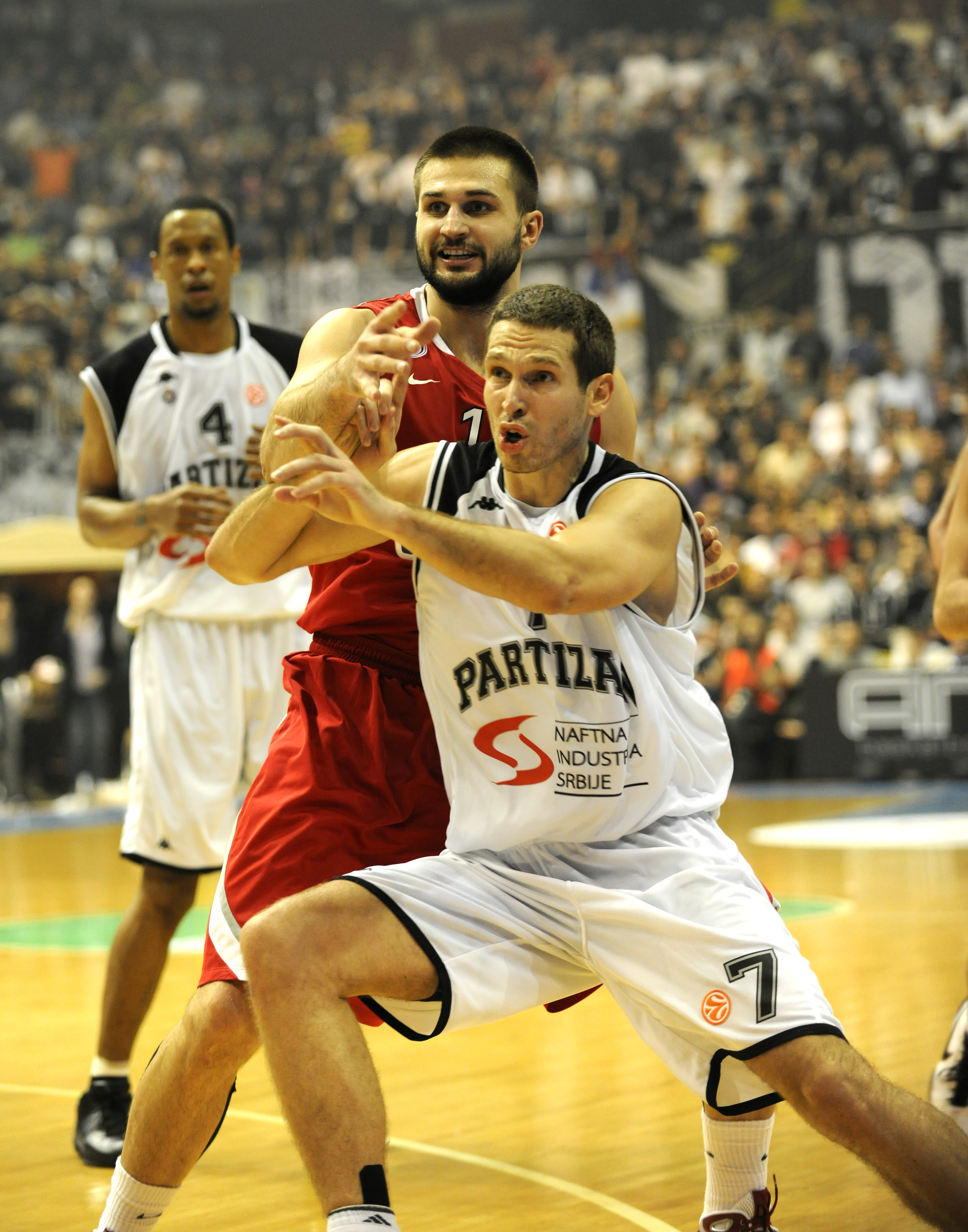
Dušan Kecman played in Partizan in one of the most beautiful periods in the history of the club. He scored a famous three-point from half-court at the buzzer against Cibona Zagreb in Adriatic League final in April 2010

Player	Nationality	Number	Position	From	To
Kaljević, Ratko	(Socialist Federal Republic of Yugoslavia)			1970	1975
Kaminsky, Frank	(United States)	44	F/C	2023	2024
Kanjevac, Slobodan	(Socialist Federal Republic of Yugoslavia)			1986	1988
Kapetanović, Goran	(Socialist Federal Republic of Yugoslavia)			1966	
Kapetanović, Planinko	(Socialist Federal Republic of Yugoslavia)			1964	1967
Karaman, Ante	(Socialist Federal Republic of Yugoslavia)			1983	1984
Karahodžić, Kenan	(Bosnia and Herzegovina)	43	PF	2016	2017
Katić, Raško	(Serbia)	14	C	2010	2012
Kecman, Dušan	(Serbia)	7	G · F	2002; 2006; 2009	2004; 2008; 2012
Kerkez, Dušan	(Socialist Federal Republic of Yugoslavia)			1971	1982
Kićanović, Dragan	(Socialist Federal Republic of Yugoslavia)	5	G	1973	1981
Kinsey, Tarence	(United States)	21	G · F	2013	2014
Klimpl, Viktor	(Socialist Federal Republic of Yugoslavia)			1950	
Klobučar, Jaka	(Slovenia)	8	G	2010	2011
Knežević, Goran	(Socialist Federal Republic of Yugoslavia)			1978	1980
Konjović, Đorđe	(Socialist Federal Republic of Yugoslavia)			1958	
Koprivica, Balša	(Serbia)	5	C	2021	2025
Koprivica, Miloš	(Serbia)	15	C	2015	2017
Koprivica, Slaviša	(Serbia and Montenegro)	15 · 13 · 9		1985; 1991; 1997	1987; 1993; 1998
Koprivica, Zoran	(Socialist Federal Republic of Yugoslavia)			1975	1976
Kostić, Pavle	(Socialist Federal Republic of Yugoslavia)			1946	
Koturović, Dejan	(Serbia and Montenegro)	6 · 10	C	1995	1997
Kovač, Mirko	(Serbia and Montenegro)	7 · 9	G	2000; 2003	2001; 2004
Kovačević, Dragan	(Socialist Federal Republic of Yugoslavia)			1980	1981
Kovačević, Zlatko	(Socialist Federal Republic of Yugoslavia)			1946	1947
Kraucer, Vlado	(Socialist Federal Republic of Yugoslavia)			1947	
Kraupa, Ivica	(Socialist Federal Republic of Yugoslavia)			1963	1965
Krečković, Zoran	(Socialist Federal Republic of Yugoslavia)			1977	1978
Križan, Boris	(Socialist Federal Republic of Yugoslavia)			1960	
Krstić, Nenad	(Serbia and Montenegro)	12	C	2000	2004
Kouzeloglou, Giannis	(Greece)	7	F	2014	2015
Kušić, Nenad	(Socialist Federal Republic of Yugoslavia)			1949	1951
Kurucs, Rodions	(Latvia)	00	SF	2021	2022

== L ==
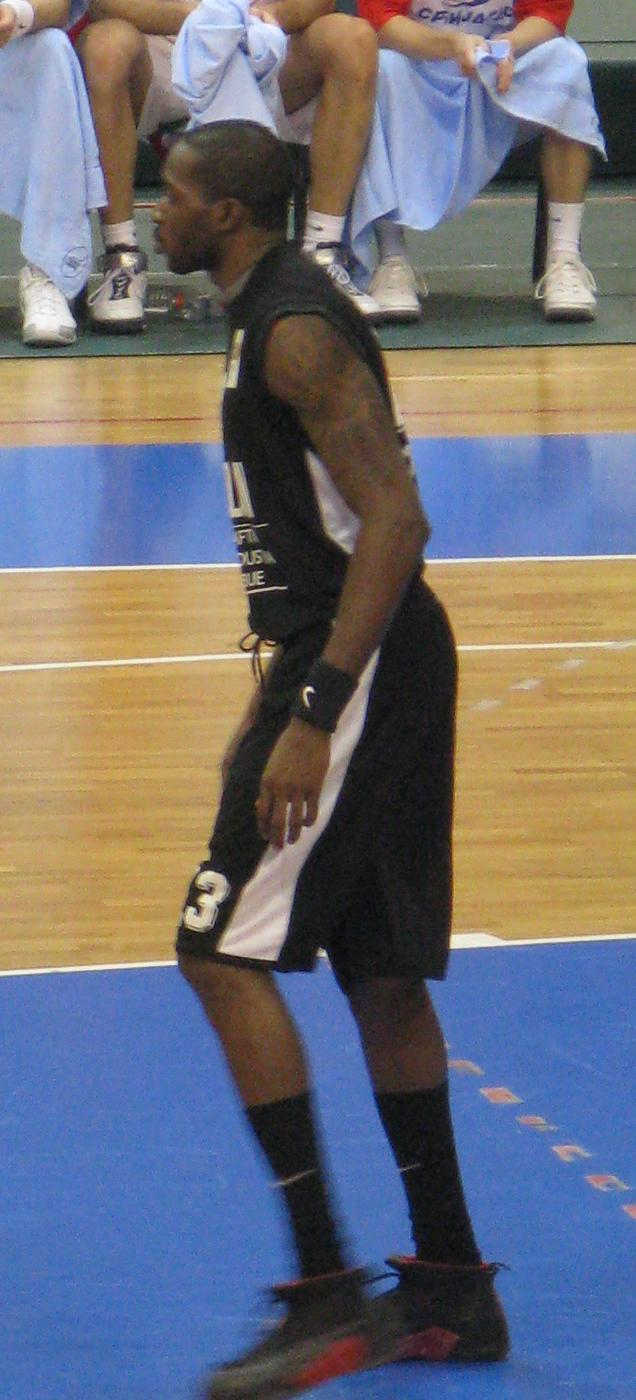
Stéphane Lasme is the only African to play for Partizan

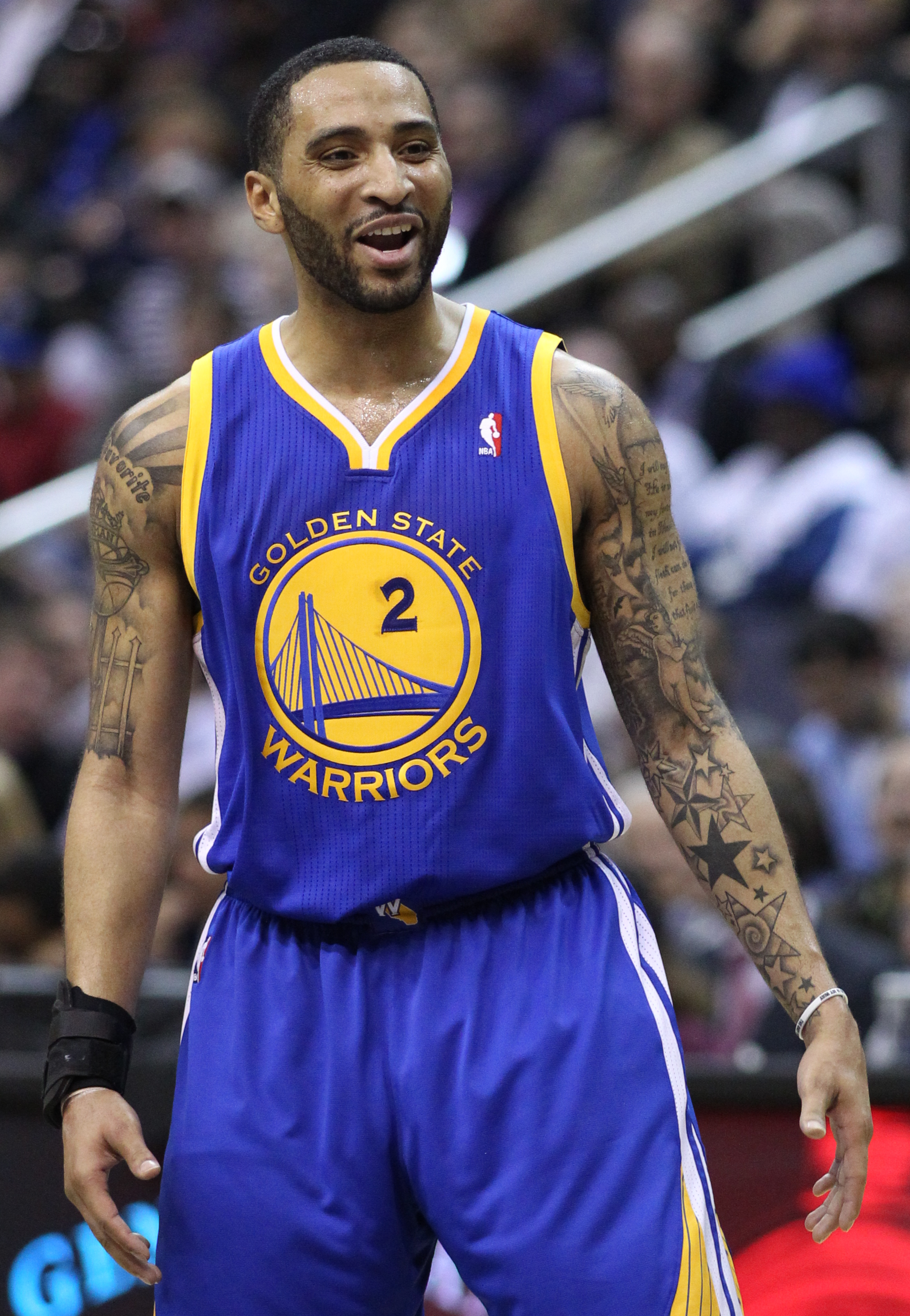
Acie Law signed with Partizan in July 2011

Player	Nationality	Number	Position	From	To
Lafayette, Oliver	(Croatia)	4	G	2010	2011
Lakić, Arijan	(Serbia)	19	G	2024	
Lakićević, Dejan	(Socialist Federal Republic of Yugoslavia)			1986	1990
Landale, Jock	(Australia)	34	C	2018	2019
Lasme, Stéphane	(Gabon)	13	F · C	2008	2009
Latifić, Goran	(Socialist Federal Republic of Yugoslavia)			1968	1977
Lauvergne, Joffrey	(France)	7	F · C	2012	2014
Law, Acie	(United States)	5	G	2011	2012
Lazarević, Mišel	(Serbia and Montenegro)			1996	1998
Lazarević, Nebojša	(Socialist Federal Republic of Yugoslavia)			1979	1983
Lazić, Đorđe	(Socialist Federal Republic of Yugoslavia)			1951	1957
LeDay, Zach	(Azerbaijan)	2	PF	2021	2024
Lessort, Mathias	(France)	26	C	2021	2023
Lekić, Marko	(Serbia and Montenegro)	6	C	2002	2003
Lešić, Sava	(Serbia)	16	F	2009	2011
Loci, Vilmoš	(Socialist Federal Republic of Yugoslavia)			1949	1951
Lončar, Nikola	(Serbia and Montenegro)	6	G	1989; 2005	1995; 2006
Lučić, Vladimir	(Serbia)	4 · 11	F	2008	2013
Lučić, Ljubo	(Socialist Federal Republic of Yugoslavia)			1954	1962
Luković, Uroš	(Serbia)	55	C	2016	2017
Lukovski, Dragan	(Serbia and Montenegro)	15	G	1995	1999
Lundberg, Gabriel	(Denmark)	1	G	2024	2025

== M ==
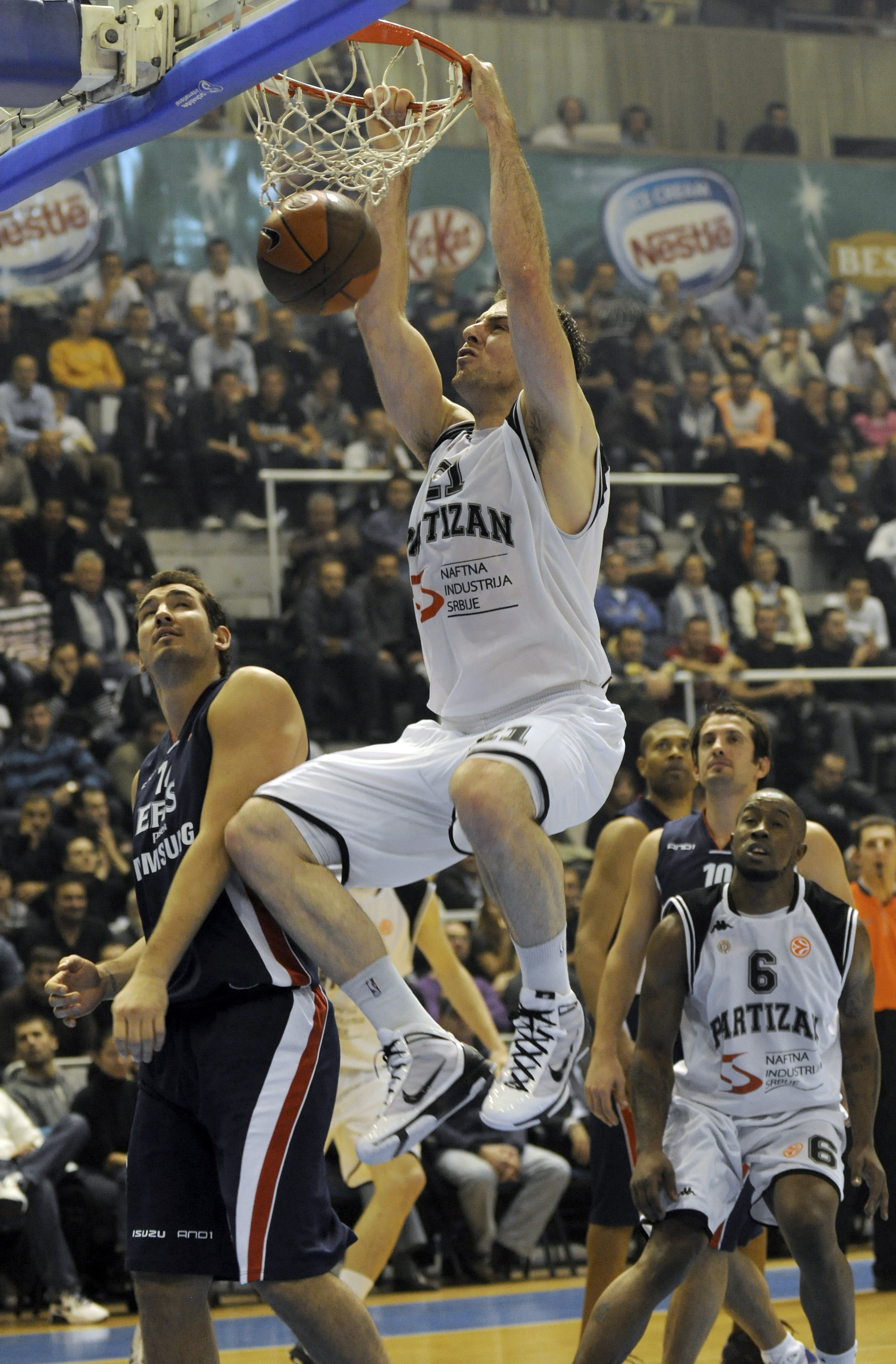
Aleks Marić was named to the All-Euroleague First Team in 2009–10 season

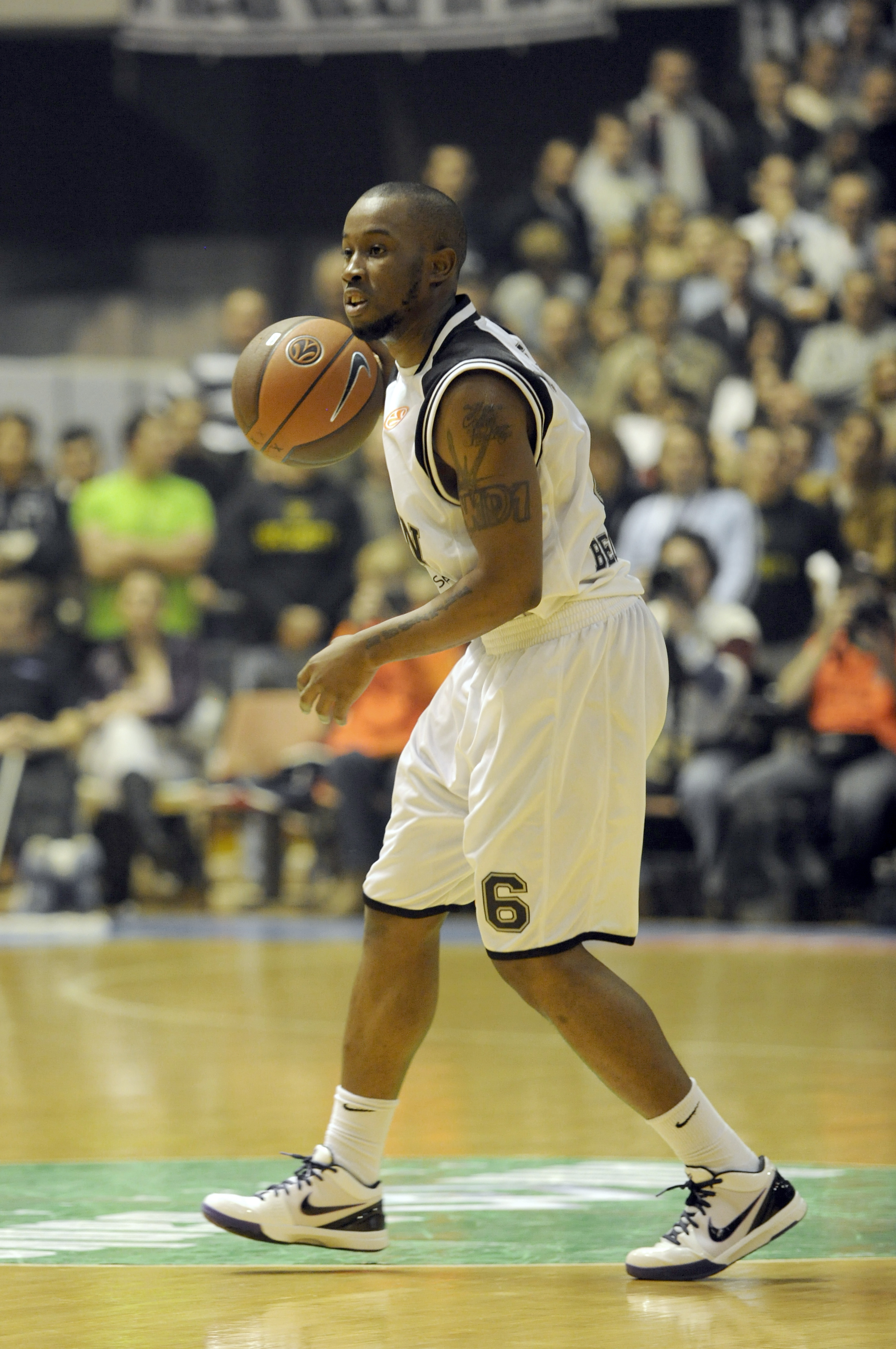
Bo McCalebb was one of the best players in Partizan's legendary 2009–10 season

Player	Nationality	Number	Position	From	To
Madar, Yam	(Israel)	41	PG	2021	2023
Mačvan, Milan	(Serbia)	25 · 13	F · C	2011; 2014	2012; 2015
Magdevski, Andrej	(North Macedonia)	19	G	2015	2016
Majstorović, Đorđe	(Serbia)	13	PF/C	2016	2017
Marić, Aleks	(Australia)	21	C	2009	2010
Marić, Miodrag	(Socialist Federal Republic of Yugoslavia)	11		1974	1986
Marinković, Ivan	(Serbia)	21	F · C	2011	2012
Marinković, Vanja	(Serbia)	9	G	2013	2019
Marjanović, Mirko	(Socialist Federal Republic of Yugoslavia)			1946	1958
Marković, Dragan	(Serbia and Montenegro)	8	F	1999	2001
Marković, Miloš	(Serbia and Montenegro)	11	F	2004	2005
Martinović, Marko	(Socialist Federal Republic of Yugoslavia)			1971	1975
Martinović, Slobodan	(Socialist Federal Republic of Yugoslavia)			1950	1951
Materić, Predrag	(Serbia and Montenegro)	10	G · F	2001; 2003	2002; 2004
Matić, Nebojša	(Socialist Federal Republic of Yugoslavia)			1984	1985
McCalebb, Bo	(North Macedonia)	6	G	2009	2010
McAdoo Michael, James	(United States)	8	F	2020	
Medić, Milan	(Socialist Federal Republic of Yugoslavia)			1977	1982
Mehmedbegović, Selimir	(Socialist Federal Republic of Yugoslavia)			1951	1959
Micov, Vladimir	(Serbia)	55	F	2006	2007
Mihajlovski, Igor	(Socialist Federal Republic of Yugoslavia)			1990	1992
Mijailović, Uroš	(Serbia)	10	G	2025	
Mijalković, Vladimir	(Socialist Federal Republic of Yugoslavia)			1962	
Mijušković, Vladimir	(Socialist Federal Republic of Yugoslavia)			1963	
Mika, Eric	(United States)	00	C	2020	2021
Mike, Isiaha	(Canada)	24	PF	2024	2025
Mikić, Viktor	(Serbia)	12	C	2023	
Miladinović, Milan	(Socialist Federal Republic of Yugoslavia)			1946	1952
Miletić, Dušan	(Serbia)	11	C	2019	2022
Miller, Patrick	(United States)	2	G	2017	2018
Miller-McIntyre, Codi	(Bulgaria)	0	G	2020	2021
Milisavljević, Branko	(Serbia and Montenegro)	14	G	2000	2001
Miljenović, Nenad	(Serbia)	9	G	2011	2012
Milojević, Dejan	(Serbia and Montenegro)	13	F · C	2004	2006
Milojević, Đorđe	(Socialist Federal Republic of Yugoslavia)			1957	1967
Milojević, Miroslav	(Socialist Federal Republic of Yugoslavia)			1978	1982
Milosavljević, Dragan	(Serbia)	12	G · F	2010	2015
Milošević, Stevan	(Serbia)	55	C	2009	2010
Milošević, Strahinja	(Serbia)	21 · 8	F	2007	2010
Milton, Shake	(United States)	20	G	2025	2026
Milutinov, Nikola	(Serbia)	8 · 11	C	2012	2015
Milutinović, Andreja	(Serbia)	22 · 33	F	2014	2016
Milutinović, Dragan	(Socialist Federal Republic of Yugoslavia)			1975	1982
Minić, Miloš	(Socialist Federal Republic of Yugoslavia)			1963	1966
Mitrović, Aleksandar	(Serbia)	19	G · F	2009	2011
Mladenov, Boyko	(Bulgaria)		C	1998	2000
Mladenović, Ljuba	(Socialist Federal Republic of Yugoslavia)			1959	1963
Munćan, Božidar	(Socialist Federal Republic of Yugoslavia)			1946	1954
Murić, Edo	(Slovenia)	8	F	2014	2016
Moore, Dallas	(Albania)	14	SG	2021	2022
Mosley, William	(United States)	42	C	2019	2021
Muurinen, Miikka	(Finland)	3	F	2025	2026
Musli, Dejan	(Serbia)	15	C	2012	2014
Mutavdžić, Miladin	(Socialist Federal Republic of Yugoslavia)			1988	1991

== N ==
Player	Nationality	Number	Position	From	To
Nađfeji, Stevan	(Serbia and Montenegro)	6	F	2001	2002
Nakić, Ivo	(Socialist Federal Republic of Yugoslavia)	15		1986	1992
Nakić, Mario	(Serbia)	7	SF	2024	
Nedić, Momčilo	(Socialist Federal Republic of Yugoslavia)			1964	
Nesterović, Radoslav	(Slovenia)			1992	1993
Nikolić, Aleksandar	(Socialist Federal Republic of Yugoslavia)			1946	
Nikolić, Aleksej	(Slovenia)	77	G	2018	2021
Novaković, Milenko	(Socialist Federal Republic of Yugoslavia)			1950	1953
Ntilikina, Frank	(France)	21	G	2024	2025
Nunnally, James	(United States)	21	SF	2022	2024

== O ==
Player	Nationality	Number	Position	From	To
Obračević, Žarko	(Socialist Federal Republic of Yugoslavia)			1965	
Obradović, Željko	(Socialist Federal Republic of Yugoslavia)	6		1984	1991
O'Connor, Marvin	(United States)	16	G	2002	2003
Orcev, Boris	(Socialist Federal Republic of Yugoslavia)			1986	1990
Orlović, Radenko	(Socialist Federal Republic of Yugoslavia)			1975	1977
Osetkowski, Dylan	(Germany)	21	F/C	2025	2026
Ostojić, Đuro	(Serbia and Montenegro)	8	C	2001	2004
Ostojić, Milan	(Socialist Federal Republic of Yugoslavia)			1953	1957

== P ==
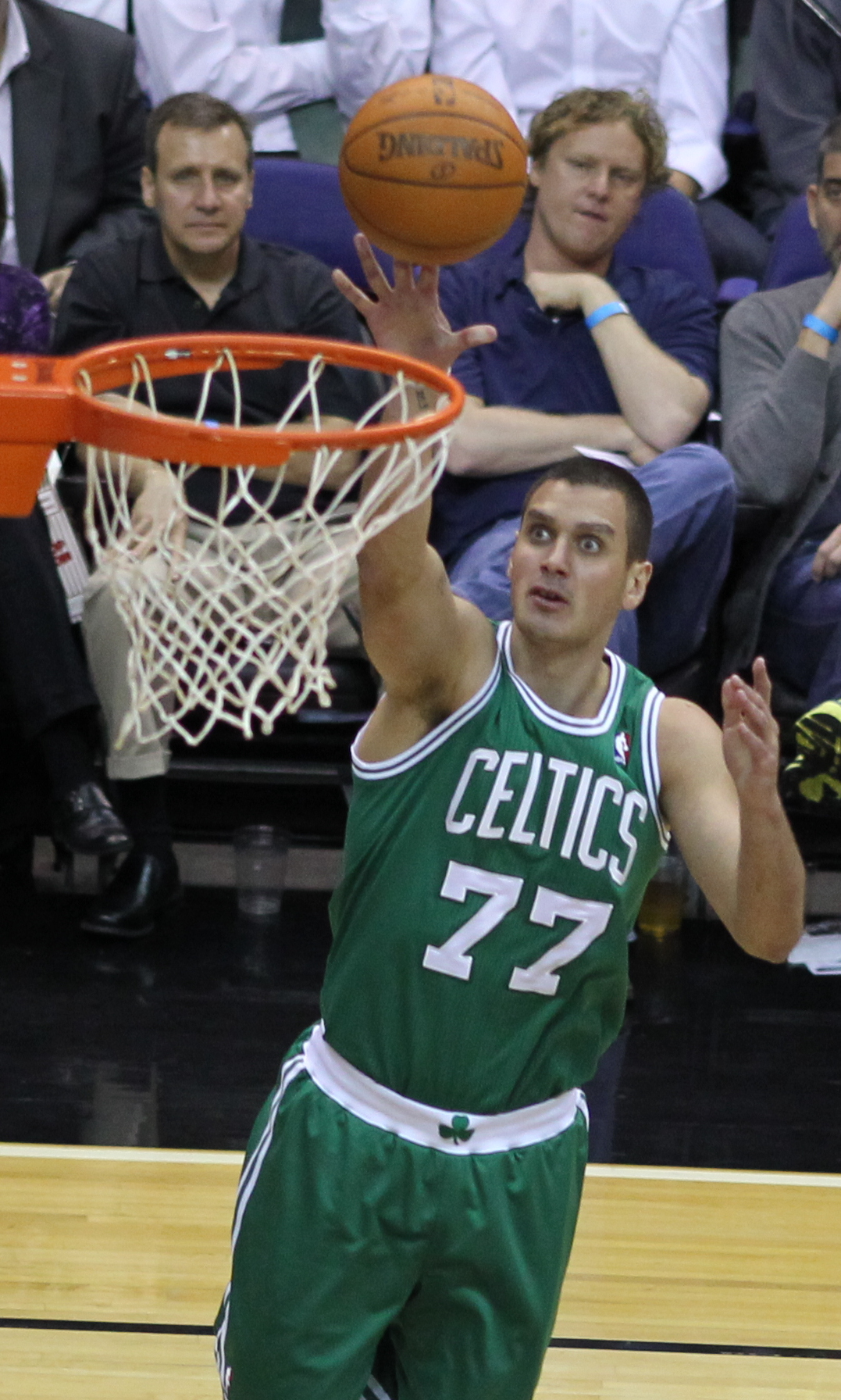
After ten years in NBA, Saša Pavlović signed with Partizan in February 2014

Player	Nationality	Number	Position	From	To
Paige, Marcus	(United States)	2	G	2018	2021
Pajola, Alessandro	(Italy)	6	PG	2026	
Pajović, Gavrilo	(Serbia and Montenegro)	5		1992	1993
Palacio, Milt	(Belize)	4	G	2007	2008
Palfi, Đerđ	(Socialist Federal Republic of Yugoslavia)			1991	1992
Pap, Karlo	(Socialist Federal Republic of Yugoslavia)			1949	
Papapetrou, Ioannis	(Greece)	10	F	2022	2023
Parakhouski, Artsiom	(Belarus)	9	C	2019	
Parežanin, Dejan	(Socialist Federal Republic of Yugoslavia)			1988	1990
Parker, Jabari	(United States)	22	PF	2025	
Paspalj, Žarko	(Socialist Federal Republic of Yugoslavia)	14	F	1986; 1990	1989; 1991
Pataki, Stevan	(Socialist Federal Republic of Yugoslavia)			1949	
Paunić, Ivan	(Serbia and Montenegro)	18		2004	2006
Pavlović, Aleksandar	(Montenegro)	8 · 3	G · F	2013	2015
Payne, Cameron	(United States)	15	G	2025	2026
Pecarski, Marko	(Serbia)	15	F · C	2017	2019
Pecarski, Miroslav	(Socialist Federal Republic of Yugoslavia)	11		1987	1991
Peiners, Žanis	(Latvia)	31	F · G	2019	2020
Peković, Marko	(Serbia and Montenegro)			1997	1999
Peković, Nikola	(Montenegro)	14 · 41	C	2005; 2011	2008; 2012
Perač, Radenko	(Socialist Federal Republic of Yugoslavia)			1959	
Perkins, Josh	(United States)	13	G	2021	
Perović, Igor	(Socialist Federal Republic of Yugoslavia)	7		1991	1992
Perović, Kosta	(Serbia)	11 · 13 · 7 · 17	C	2002; 2015	2007; 2016
Pešaković, Nikola	(Serbia)	4	G	2011	2012
Pešić, Arsenije	(Socialist Federal Republic of Yugoslavia)		F	1976	1985
Pešić, Svetislav	(Socialist Federal Republic of Yugoslavia)			1968	1971
Petrov, Dejan	(Serbia)	11	F	2015	
Petrović, Boban	(Socialist Federal Republic of Yugoslavia)			1976	1985
Petrović, Mihailo	(Serbia)	4	G	2021	2023
Petrović, Miodrag	(Socialist Federal Republic of Yugoslavia)			1958	1961
Petrović, Veselin	(Serbia and Montenegro)	5	G · F	1999	2002
Petrović, Vladimir	(Serbia and Montenegro)			1993	1997
Pokuševski, Aleksej	(Serbia)	11	F	2024	2026
Polić, Milorad	(Socialist Federal Republic of Yugoslavia)			1960	1962
Popović, Bojan	(Serbia and Montenegro)			1992	1993
Popović, Bojan	(Serbia)	4	G	2010	
Popović, Branimir	(Socialist Federal Republic of Yugoslavia)			1970	1977
Popović, Oliver	(Socialist Federal Republic of Yugoslavia)	13		1987	1991
Ponitka, Mateusz	(Poland)	37	SF	2023	2024
Pot, Stefan	(Serbia)	33	SG	2016	2017
Prlinčević, Predrag	(Socialist Federal Republic of Yugoslavia)			1988	1990
Protić, Miroslav	(Socialist Federal Republic of Yugoslavia)			1959	
Punter, Kevin	(United States)	7	SG	2021	2024
Pušica, Vasilije	(Serbia)	4	SG	2019	

== R ==
Player	Nationality	Number	Position	From	To
Radanov, Aleksa	(Serbia)	13	G	2026	
Radenović, Ivan	(Serbia and Montenegro)			2002	2003
Radivojević, Milan	(Socialist Federal Republic of Yugoslavia)			1955	1958
Radojčić, Dušan	(Socialist Federal Republic of Yugoslavia)			1952	
Radojčić, Milovan	(Socialist Federal Republic of Yugoslavia)			1983	1985
Radošević, Miroslav	(Serbia and Montenegro)	13	G	1997	2000
Radovanović, Nikola	(Serbia)	24	F	2020	2022
Radović, Branko	(Socialist Federal Republic of Yugoslavia)			1955	1957
Radović, Radovan	(Socialist Federal Republic of Yugoslavia)			1957	1968
Raduljica, Miroslav	(Serbia)	8	C	2011	2012
Radunović, Saša	(Socialist Federal Republic of Yugoslavia)	9		1989	1990
Raičević, Boris	(Serbia and Montenegro)	9		1999	2000
Rainović, Predrag	(Socialist Federal Republic of Yugoslavia)			1968	1969
Rakočević, Žarko	(Montenegro)	22	F · C	2008	2010
Rančić, Aleksandar	(Socialist Federal Republic of Yugoslavia)			1969	1970
Rastović, Dušan	(Socialist Federal Republic of Yugoslavia)			1977	1978
Ratkovica, Branislav	(Serbia)	6	PG	2016	2017
Rašić, Aleksandar	(Serbia)	10	G	2008	2010
Rebić, Nebojša	(Socialist Federal Republic of Yugoslavia)			1979	1980
Rebrača, Željko	(Serbia and Montenegro)	11	C	1991	1995
Redding, Reggie	(United States)	15		2019	2020
Renfroe, Alex	(Bosnia and Herzegovina)	32	G	2018	2019
Ridanović, Ivan	(Socialist Federal Republic of Yugoslavia)			1946	
Ristanović, Dragan	(Serbia and Montenegro)	15		1994	1995
Ristanović, Goran	(Socialist Federal Republic of Yugoslavia)			1981	1983
Riznić, Bogdan	(Serbia)	6	F	2007	2009
Roberts, Lawrence	(United States)	4	F	2009	2010
Robinson, Frank	(United States)	5	SF	2016	2017

== S ==
Player	Nationality	Number	Position	From	To
Sajkov, Zlatko	(Socialist Federal Republic of Yugoslavia)			1963	
Šalić, Đoko	(Serbia)	18 · 55 · 95	C	2013; 2014	2017; 2018
Samardžiski, Predrag	(North Macedonia)	12 · 15	C	2001	2006
Samuels, Samardo	(Jamaica)	23	C	2017	
Šaper, Radomir	(Socialist Federal Republic of Yugoslavia)			1946	1953
Šaper, Svetomir	(Socialist Federal Republic of Yugoslavia)			1946	1947
Šarić, Dragiša	(Socialist Federal Republic of Yugoslavia)	10		1991	1992
Savanović, Goran	(Serbia and Montenegro)	10	G	2004	2005
Savović, Boban	(Serbia and Montenegro)	5	G	2002	2003
Savović, Milenko	(Socialist Federal Republic of Yugoslavia)	10		1977	1989
Savović, Predrag	(Serbia and Montenegro)			1993	1994
Šćepanović, Vlado	(Serbia and Montenegro)	4 · 44	G	2001; 2003	2002; 2004
Šekularac, Đorđe	(Serbia)	21	G	2025	
Sekulić, Blagota	(Serbia and Montenegro)	9	F	2002	2003
Šijačić, Danilo	(Socialist Federal Republic of Yugoslavia)			1953	1955
Šilobad, Mlađan	(Serbia and Montenegro)	12 · 6		1991; 2003	1995; 2004
Simić, Zoran	(Socialist Federal Republic of Yugoslavia)			1968	1973
Sinđelić, Branko	(Socialist Federal Republic of Yugoslavia)			1991	1992
Sinovec, Stefan	(Serbia)	5	G	2009	2010
Sjekloća, Luka	(Serbia and Montenegro)			2003	2004
Slavnić, Zoran	(Socialist Federal Republic of Yugoslavia)			1981	1982
Šljivančanin, Slobodan	(Socialist Federal Republic of Yugoslavia)			1990	1991
Smailagić, Alen	(Serbia)	9	F/C	2021	2024
Smiljanić, Aleksandar	(Serbia and Montenegro)	17	G	2005	2006
Smith, Jaleen	(Croatia)	0	G	2023	2024
Sočo, Bruno	(Socialist Federal Republic of Yugoslavia)			1969	1970
Šoškić, Vojin	(Socialist Federal Republic of Yugoslavia)			1955	1957
Sremčević, Slobodan	(Socialist Federal Republic of Yugoslavia)			1967	1970
Sretenović, Zoran	(Serbia and Montenegro)	4		1993	1994
Štajnberger, Ivan	(Socialist Federal Republic of Yugoslavia)			1954	
Stanković, Borislav	(Socialist Federal Republic of Yugoslavia)			1951	1953
Stanojević, Jovo	(Serbia and Montenegro)	9	C	2001	2002
Stefanović, Lazar	(Serbia)	9	G	2019	2021
Stefanović, Nenad	(Serbia and Montenegro)			2005	2006
Stefanović, Savo	(Socialist Federal Republic of Yugoslavia)			1984	1987
Stepanović, Aleksa	(Serbia)	7	F	2021	
Stepp, Blake	(United States)	24	G	2004	2005
Stevanović, Andreja	(Serbia)	28	G	2017	
Stevanović, Želimir	(Serbia and Montenegro)			1994	1995
Stevanović, Zoran	(Serbia and Montenegro)	8	C	1990; 1998	1996; 1999
Stevens, Lamar	(United States)		F	2026	
Stojačić, Zoran	(Socialist Federal Republic of Yugoslavia)			1984	1985
Stojičević, Čedomir	(Socialist Federal Republic of Yugoslavia)			1946	1954
Stojković, Slađan	(Serbia and Montenegro)	15		1992	1993
Šuput, Predrag	(Serbia and Montenegro)	8	F	2004	2006
Sy, Bandja	(France)	5	F	2018	2019

== T ==
Player	Nationality	Number	Position	From	To
Tadić, Tadija	(Serbia)	6	G	2017	2021
Tanasković, Dušan	(Serbia)	20	C	2018	2022
Tanasković, Nikola	(Serbia)	10	F	2015	2019
Tapušković, Stevan	(Serbia)			2006	2008
Taylor, Butch	(United States)	8	C	1976	1977
Tepić, Milenko	(Serbia)	5 · 4	G	2006; 2013	2009; 2015
Thomas, Torey	(United States)	5	G	2012	
Thomas, Rashawn	(United States)	25	F	2019	2021
Thompson, Ethan	(Puerto Rico)		SG	2026	
Todorić, Dragan	(Socialist Federal Republic of Yugoslavia)	5		1972	1983
Tomašević, Dejan	(Serbia and Montenegro)	12	C	1995	1999
Tomić, Obrad	(Bosnia and Herzegovina)	14	C	2017	2018
Tomić, Vele	(Socialist Federal Republic of Yugoslavia)			1956	1958
Trifunović, Uroš	(Serbia)	3 · 32	F	2018	2024
Tripković, Uroš	(Serbia)	4 · 11	G	2002	2009

== U ==
Player	Nationality	Number	Position	From	To
Ugrinić, Predrag	(Socialist Federal Republic of Yugoslavia)			1983	1984
Uskoković, Dragan	(Socialist Federal Republic of Yugoslavia)			1968	1969

== V ==
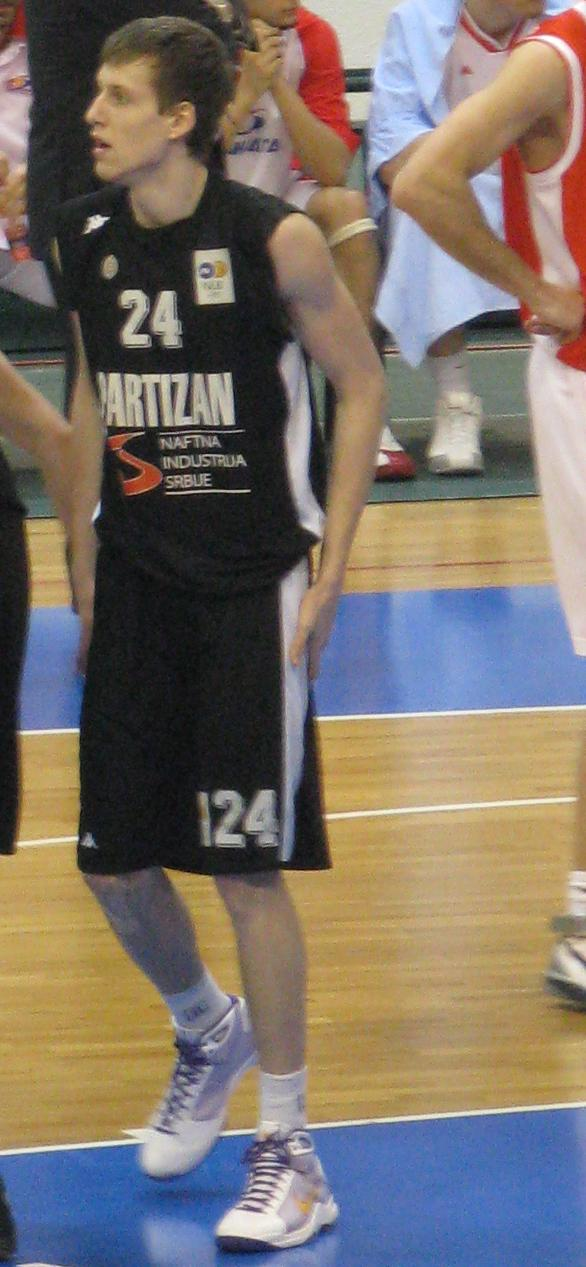
Jan Veselý played in Partizan from 2008 to 2011, before he went to the NBA. He won three times Triple Crown, twice reach quarterfinals of the Euroleague and one time Euroleague Final Four

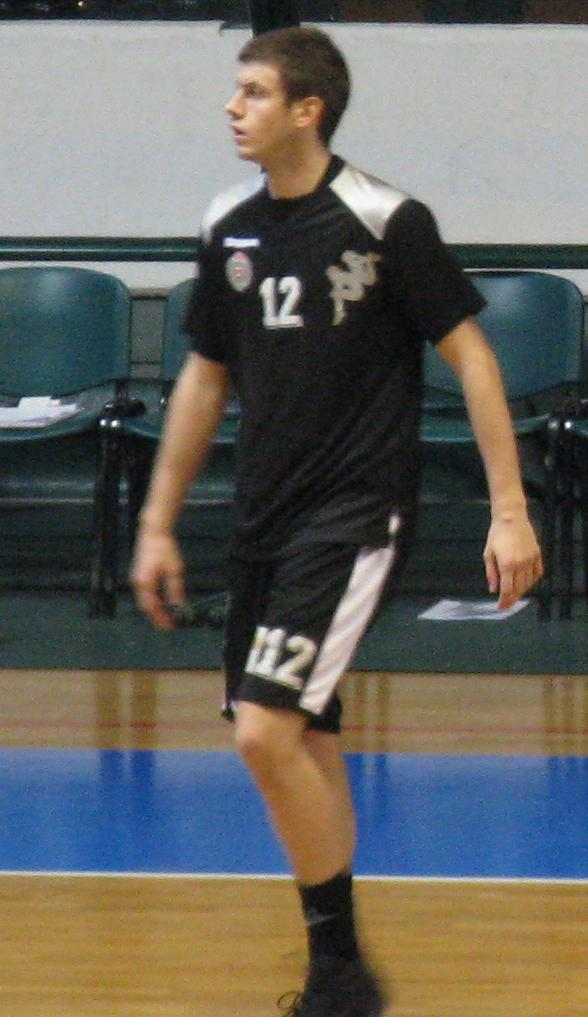
In 2009, Novica Veličković won the Euroleague Rising Star award

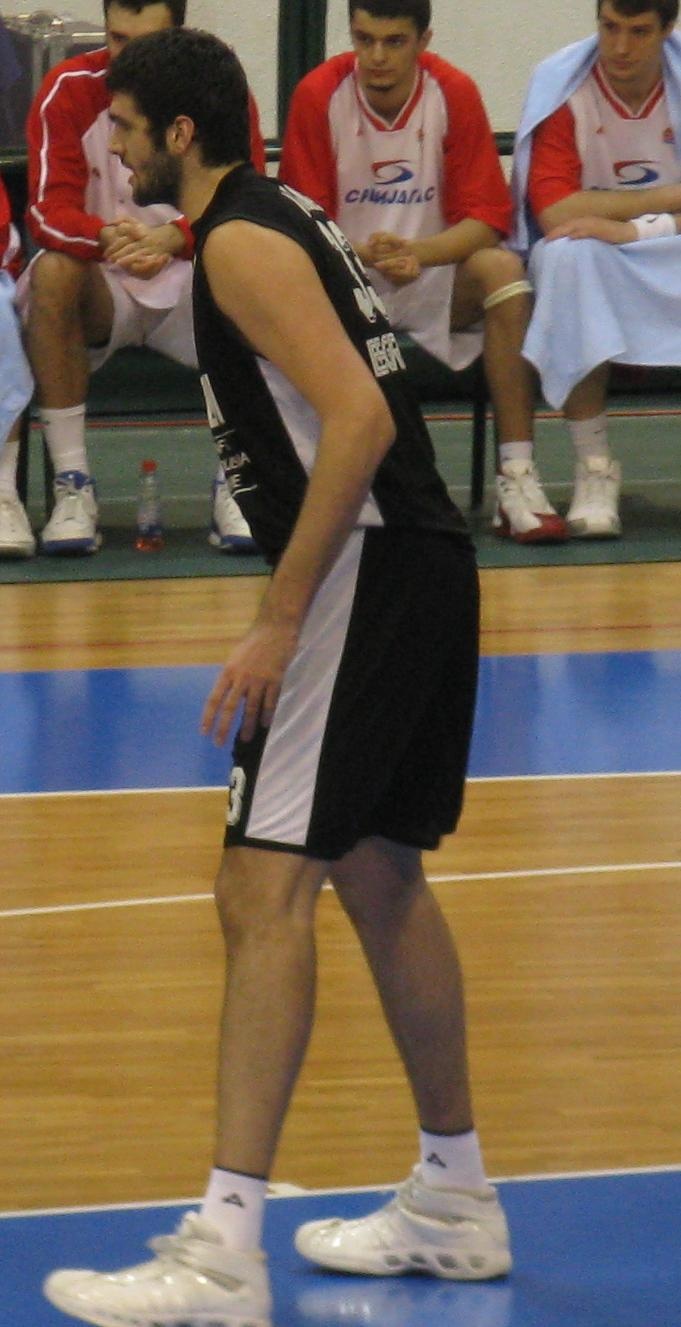
At 2.29 m, Slavko Vraneš is the tallest player in Partizan history

Player	Nationality	Number	Position	From	To
Varda, Ratko	(Serbia and Montenegro)	11 · 10	C	1995	2001
Vaughn, Kwame	(United States)	4	G	2018	
Velanac, Dragoslav	(Socialist Federal Republic of Yugoslavia)			1963	1964
Veličković, Novica	(Serbia)	17 · 12	F	2004; 2016	2009; 2021
Veselý, Jan	(Czech Republic)	24	F	2008	2011
Vidačić, Dragoljub	(Serbia and Montenegro)	4	G	1995	1997
Vidačić, Vladimir	(Serbia and Montenegro)	11		1993; 1996	1995; 2000
Vildoza, Luca	(Argentina)		G	2026	
Vilfan, Peter	(Socialist Federal Republic of Yugoslavia)	12		1985	1986
Višekruna, Vojislav	(Socialist Federal Republic of Yugoslavia)			1975	1976
Vitkovac, Čedomir	(Serbia)	15 · 13	F	2007; 2015	2009; 2016
Vlahović, Ratko	(Socialist Federal Republic of Yugoslavia)			1946	1947
Vojnić, Velimir	(Socialist Federal Republic of Yugoslavia)			1968	1969
Vrabac, Adin	(Bosnia and Herzegovina)	27	F	2015	2017
Vraneš, Slavko	(Montenegro)	33	C	2007	2010
Vujačić, Jadran	(Socialist Federal Republic of Yugoslavia)	8		1977; 1988	1980; 1989
Vujanić, Miloš	(Serbia and Montenegro)	13	G	2001	2003
Vujović, Vukašin	(Serbia)	9	F	2010	2011
Vukčević, Tristan	(Serbia)	1	PF/C	2022	2024
Vuković, Lazar	(Socialist Federal Republic of Yugoslavia)			1946	1947

== W ==
Player	Nationality	Number	Position	From	To
Walden, Corey	(United States)	2	G	2019	2020
Washington Jr., Duane	(Germany)	4	G	2024	2026
Westermann, Léo	(France)	9	G	2012	2014
Williams, Darrell	(United States)	25	C	2016	
Williams-Goss, Nigel	(United States)	3	G	2017	2018
Willis, Derek	(United States)		PF	2026	
Wilson, Jamar	(Finland)	31	G	2015	2016
Wilson, Tom	(Australia)	11	G	2017	

== Z ==
Player	Nationality	Number	Position	From	To
Zagorac, Rade	(Serbia)	25	F	2018	2022
Zečević, Žarko	(Socialist Federal Republic of Yugoslavia)	14		1967	1977
Živanović, Dragan	(Socialist Federal Republic of Yugoslavia)			1982	1986
Živković, Srđan	(Serbia and Montenegro)			2001	2002
Zorkić, Nebojša	(Socialist Federal Republic of Yugoslavia)			1979	1986
Žutić, Borislav	(Socialist Federal Republic of Yugoslavia)			1960	1968

== Foreign players ==
Country	Players
United States	47
Montenegro	7
France	6
Bosnia and Herzegovina	6
Slovenia	5
Australia	5
North Macedonia	4
Germany	4
Latvia	3
Greece	3
Bulgaria	2
Croatia	2
Slovakia	2
Finland	2
Italy	1
Argentina	1
Nigeria	1
Puerto Rico	1
Canada	1
Angola	1
Israel	1
Brazil	1
Albania	1
Denmark	1
Turkey	1
Azerbaijan	1
Ghana	1
Uganda	1
South Sudan	1
Central African Republic	1
Gabon	1
Poland	1
Czech Republic	1
Belarus	1
Belize	1
Jamaica	1
Colombia	1

== See also ==
- KK Crvena Zvezda all-time roster
