= 1997 FIBA Europe Under-16 Championship qualification =

Basketball competition

The qualification competition for the 1997 FIBA Europe Under-16 Championship consisted in two different qualification rounds: the qualifying round and the challenge round. Greece, Macedonia and Italy, as third, fourth and fifth place in the previous tournament, received a bye to the challenge round. Croatia, as title holder, Spain, as runner-up, and Belgium, as host, qualified directly for the tournament.

== Qualifying round ==
Twenty-three national teams entered in this round. They were allocated in five groups (three groups of five teams and two groups of four teams). The top three teams advanced to the challenge round, where they joined Greece, Macedonia and Italy.

Team advanced to the challenge round

Teams in italics hosted the mini-tournament.

=== Group A ===
The matches were played on April 19–21, 2006.

Team	Pld	W	L	PF	PA	Pts
Bulgaria	3	3	0	206	190	6
Poland	3	2	1	236	196	5
Lithuania	3	1	2	216	213	4
Finland	3	0	3	172	231	3

=== Group B ===
The matches were played on April 17–21, 2006.

Team	Pld	W	L	PF	PA	Pts
Cyprus	4	4	0	309	223	8
Israel	4	3	1	253	195	7
Yugoslavia	4	2	2	335	272	6
Armenia	4	1	3	273	296	5
Romania	4	0	4	201	385	4

=== Group C ===
The matches were played on April 17–21, 2006.

Team	Pld	W	L	PF	PA	Pts
Russia	4	4	0	341	194	8
Latvia	4	3	1	267	234	7
Hungary	4	2	2	261	238	6
Czech Republic	4	1	3	260	292	5
Luxembourg	4	0	4	190	361	4

=== Group D ===
The matches were played on April 12–14, 2006.

Team	Pld	W	L	PF	PA	Pts
France	3	3	0	247	127	8
England	3	2	1	177	170	7
Ukraine	3	1	2	143	187	6
Portugal	3	0	3	122	205	5

=== Group E ===
The matches were played on April 17–21, 2006.

Team	Pld	W	L	PF	PA	Pts
Slovenia	4	4	0	270	206	8
Turkey	4	3	1	260	209	7
Georgia	4	2	2	222	271	6
Slovakia	4	1	3	204	224	5
Germany	4	0	4	184	230	4

== Challenge round ==
The fifteen national teams entering from the qualifying round joined Greece, Macedonia and Italy in this round. The eighteen teams were allocated in three groups of six teams each. The three top teams of each group advanced to the final tournament, where they joined Croatia, Spain, and Belgium.

Team advanced to the 1997 FIBA Europe Under-16 Championship

Teams in italics hosted the mini-tournament.

=== Group A ===
Team	Pld	W	L	PF	PA	Pts
North Macedonia	5	4	1	391	319	9
Israel	5	4	1	307	275	9
France	5	3	2	369	301	8
Hungary	5	2	3	313	367	7
Turkey	5	1	4	326	368	6
Bulgaria	5	1	4	325	401	6

=== Group B ===
Team	Pld	W	L	PF	PA	Pts
Russia	5	5	0	372	261	10
Slovenia	5	4	1	360	298	9
Italy	5	3	2	316	309	8
Lithuania	5	2	3	328	344	7
Cyprus	5	1	4	292	326	6
England	5	0	5	246	376	5

=== Group C ===
Team	Pld	W	L	PF	PA	Pts
Greece	5	5	0	437	308	10
Yugoslavia	5	4	1	369	338	9
Georgia	5	3	2	364	376	8
Latvia	5	2	3	351	326	7
Poland	5	1	4	318	376	6
Ukraine	5	0	5	297	412	5
