= Richard Petruška =

Slovak basketball player

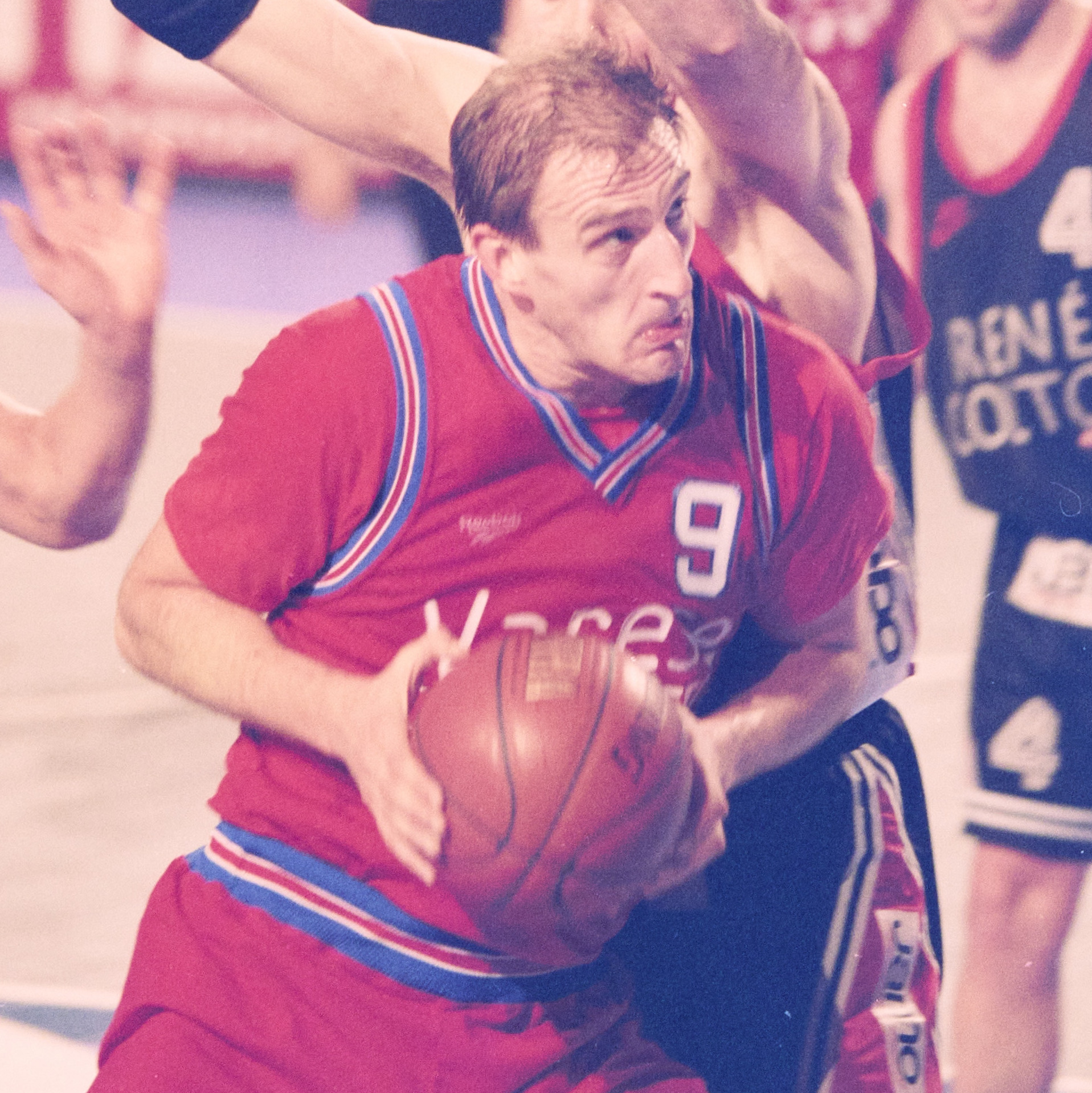
- Petruška with Varese in 1996

Personal information
- Born: 25 January 1969 (age 57) Levice, Czechoslovakia
- Listed height: 6 ft 10 in (2.08 m)
- Listed weight: 260 lb (118 kg)

Career information
- High school: Gymnázium Andreja Vrábla Levice (Levice, Slovakia); Gymnázium Hubeného (Bratislava, Slovakia)
- College: Loyola Marymount (1990–1991); UCLA (1992–1993)
- NBA draft: 1993: 2nd round, 46th overall pick
- Drafted by: Houston Rockets
- Playing career: 1988–2003
- Position: Power forward / center
- Number: 3

Career history
- 1988–1990: Inter Bratislava
- 1993–1994: Houston Rockets
- 1994–1998: Cagiva Varese
- 1998–1999: Galatasaray
- 1999–2001: Unicaja Málaga
- 2001: Tau Cerámica
- 2002–2003: Upea Capo D'Orlando
- 2003: CAI Zaragoza

Career highlights
- NBA champion (1994); FIBA Korać Cup champion (2001); 2× Czechoslovak League All-Star Five (1988, 1989); 3× Slovak Player of the Year (1998–2000)
- Stats at NBA.com
- Stats at Basketball Reference
Medals
Representing Czechoslovakia
Men's basketball
European U18 Championship
Bronze medal – third place	1988 Yugoslavia	Under-18 Team

Richard Petruška (born 25 January 1969) is a Slovak-Italian former professional basketball player and coach. He was born in Levice, Czechoslovakia. At a height of 6 ft 10 in (2.08 m), and a weight of 260 pounds (120 kg), he played the power forward and center positions.

In 1994, he became the first European to win an NBA championship.

== College career ==
Petruška played college basketball for the Loyola Marymount Lions and UCLA Bruins in the United States.

== Professional career ==
Petruška was selected by the Houston Rockets, of the National Basketball Association (NBA), with the 46th overall pick (2nd round), of the 1993 NBA draft. He played in 22 games with the Rockets during the 1993–94 NBA season, and scored 53 total points. His only NBA season also saw him as part of an NBA championship team, which resulted in him accidentally dropping and denting the team's first Larry O'Brien Championship Trophy during the celebration of the title. The dent in the trophy's basketball would remain a part of the trophy until 2018, when the team commissioned replacements after an ownership change.

== National team career ==
Petruška was a member of the senior Czechoslovakia national basketball team. He played with the Czechoslovakia at the 1991 EuroBasket.

== Coaching career ==
After he retired from playing professional basketball, Petruška became a basketball coach. He has worked as a coach at the CBA (Canarias Basketball Academy).

== Personal life ==
As of 2019, Petruška lives in Canada with his wife and two sons.
