= Enukidze =

Yenukidze or Enukidze is a Georgian surname. Notable people with the surname include:

- Andro Enukidze, Georgian theater director
- Avel Yenukidze, Georgian "Old Bolshevik"
