= Gomboc =

Gomboc may refer to:

== Mathematics ==
- Gömböc, a convex three-dimensional body that has one stable and one unstable point of equilibrium

== People ==
- Andreja Gomboc (born 1969), Slovenian astrophysicist
- Adrian Gomboc (born 1995), Slovenian judoka
- Ron Gomboc (born 1947), Slovenian-born Australian sculptor
