= Andro (name) =

Andro is a given name and a surname. The alternate Scottish spelling is Androw. Notable people with the name include:

== Given name ==
- Andro Bušlje (born 1986), Croatian water polo player
- Andro Enukidze (born 1965), Georgian theater director
- Andro Franca (born 1987), Dutch footballer
- Andro Giorgadze (born 1996), Georgian footballer
- Andro Hart (died 1621), Scottish printer
- Andro Knego (born 1956), Croatian former professional basketball player
- Andro Knel (1967–1989), Dutch footballer
- Andro Krstulović Opara (born 1967), Croatian politician and art historian
- Andro Linklater (1944–2013), Scottish non-fiction writer and historian
- Andro Man (died 1598), Scottish cunning man
- Andro Michel (born 1990), Swedish ice hockey player
- Androw Myllar (fl. 1503–1508), Scottish printer
- Andro Švrljuga (born 1985), Croatian footballer
- Andro Vlahušić (born 1960), Croatian physician and politician
- Andro Wekua (born 1977), Georgian-born Swiss artist

== Surname ==
- Jean-Claude Andro (1937–2000), French writer

== See also ==
- Andro (disambiguation)
- Andrija
- Andrej
