= Andro =

Andro may refer to:

- Andro (name)
- Andro (album), a 2020 album by Tommy Lee
- Andro, Imphal East, a town in Manipur, India
- A slang word for anabolic steroids
- Androstenedione, a steroid, often called andro or andros for short
- An Dro, folk dance from Brittany
- A dialect of the Chakpa language

== See also ==
- Androcentrism
- Andros (disambiguation)
