= Zoran Krečković =

Serbian basketball player and coach

Personal information
- Born: 17 April 1959 (age 67) Yugoslavia
- Listed height: 1.97 m (6 ft 6 in)

Career information
- NBA draft: 1981: undrafted
- Playing career: 1977–1992
- Position: Shooting guard
- Number: 6
- Coaching career: 1996–present

Career history

Playing
- 1977–1978: Partizan
- 1982–1992: IMT

Coaching
- 1996–2000: Beopetrol
- 2001–2002: Crvena zvezda
- 2002–2003: Yamolgaz '92 Yambol
- 2004–2006, 2008–2009: Kuwait
- 2011–2012: Al Sadd
- 2012: Osaka Evessa
- 2012–2014: Al-Jahra
- 2014–2018: Al Sadd
- 2018–2020: Al-Jahra

Career highlights
- As player: FIBA Korać Cup winner (1978); Yugoslav Cup winner (1987); As head coach: Emir of Qatar Cup winner (2012)

Zoran Krečković (Serbian Cyrillic: Зоран Кречковић, born 17 April 1959) is a Serbian professional basketball coach and former player.

== Coaching career ==
Krečković began his coaching career in 1996 with IMT Beopetrol in Belgrade. In February 2000 he got fired. He had a stint at Crvena zvezda in 2001–02 before moving on to Yamolgaz '92 Yambol in the Bulgarian League from 2002–03.

Krečković coached the Kuwait national team from 2004–06 and in 2008–09, including appearances in the 2005 FIBA Asia Championship in Doha and the 2009 Asia Championship in Tianjin, China.

He guided Al Sadd in the 2011–12 Qatari League season and got second position in the league and Emir Cup title in that season. Krečković had a stint at Osaka Evessa of Japan League in 2012. After that he coached Al Jahraa in Kuwaiti League for two seasons.

In 2014, Krečković became a head coach of Al Sadd for second time. In July 2018, he became a head coach of Al Jahraa for second time.

== Career achievements ==
As player

- FIBA Korać Cup winner: 1 (with Partizan: 1977–78)
- Yugoslav Cup winner: 1 (with IMT: 1986–87)

As head coach

- Emir of Qatar Cup winner: 1 (with Al Sadd: 2011–12)

== Head coaching record ==
Legend
Regular season	G	Games coached	W	Games won	L	Games lost	W–L %	Win–loss %
Playoffs	PG	Playoff games	PW	Playoff wins	PL	Playoff losses	PW–L %	Playoff win–loss %

Team	Year	G	W	L	W–L%	Finish	PG	PW	PL	PW–L%	Result
Osaka Evessa	2012	4	0	4	.000	Fired	-	-	-	–	-

== See also ==
- List of KK Crvena zvezda head coaches
- KK Partizan all-time roster
