= 1997 FIBA Europe Under-16 Championship =

1997 EuroBasket Under-16
14th FIBA Europe Under-16 Championship

Tournament details
- Host country: Belgium
- Dates: 11–20 July 1997
- Teams: 12
- Venue(s): (in 3 host cities)

Final positions
- Champions: Yugoslavia (1st title)

Tournament statistics
- Top scorer: (North Macedonia) Vlado Ilievski (24.9)
- Top rebounds: (Georgia (country)) Vladimir Boisa (13.3)
- Top assists: (Croatia) Ivan Tomas (4.9)
- PPG (Team): Greece (82.6)
- RPG (Team): Russia (40.8)
- APG (Team): Spain (16.3)

Official website
- Official website (archive)

The 1997 FIBA Europe Under-16 Championship (known at that time as 1997 European Championship for Cadets) was the 14th edition of the FIBA Europe Under-16 Championship. The cities of Pepinster, Kortrijk and Quaregnon, in Belgium, hosted the tournament. Yugoslavia won the trophy for the sixth time, the first since the breakup of Yugoslavia.

== Teams ==
- Belgium
- Croatia
- Yugoslavia
- France
- Georgia
- Greece
- Israel
- Italy
- Macedonia
- Russia
- Slovenia
- Spain

== Qualification ==
There were two qualifying rounds for this tournament. Twenty-three national teams entered the qualifying round. Fifteen teams advanced to the Challenge Round, where they joined Greece, Macedonia and Italy. The remaining eighteen teams were allocated in three groups of six teams each. The three top teams of each group joined Croatia (title holder), Spain (runner-up) and Belgium (host) in the final tournament.

== Preliminary round ==
The twelve teams were allocated in two groups of six teams each.

Team advanced to Quarterfinals
Team competed in 9th–12th playoffs

=== Group A ===
Team	Pld	W	L	PF	PA	Pts
Russia	5	5	0	403	305	10
Israel	5	3	2	301	319	8
France	5	3	2	364	377	8
Yugoslavia	5	2	3	391	380	7
Macedonia	5	2	3	352	337	7
Belgium	5	0	5	297	390	5

=== Group B ===
Team	Pld	W	L	PF	PA	Pts
Greece	5	5	0	411	363	10
Spain	5	4	1	390	352	9
Croatia	5	2	3	343	365	7
Slovenia	5	2	3	353	329	7
Georgia	5	1	4	348	430	6
Italy	5	1	4	323	329	6

== Knockout stage ==
=== 9th–12th playoffs ===
Playoffs
Belgium	67
Georgia	76
Italy	57
Macedonia	76

Ninth place
Georgia	46
Macedonia	44
Eleventh place
Belgium	50
Italy	88

=== Championship ===
Quarterfinals
Spain	78
France	80
Russia	92
Slovenia	70
Greece	66
Yugoslavia	73
Israel	82
Croatia	78

Semifinals
France	61
Russia	66
Yugoslavia	74
Israel	68

Final
Russia	87
Yugoslavia	100
Third place
France	55
Israel	65

==== 5th–8th playoffs ====
Playoffs
Spain	67
Slovenia	61
Greece	92
Croatia	68

Fifth place
Spain	85
Greece	92
Seventh place
Slovenia	80
Croatia	75

== Final standings ==
Rank	Team
Gold medal	Yugoslavia
Silver medal	Russia
Bronze medal	Israel
4th	France
5th	Greece
6th	Spain
7th	Slovenia
8th	Croatia
9th	Georgia
10th	Macedonia
11th	Italy
12th	Belgium

1997 European Championship for Cadets

Yugoslavia
Sixth title

Team roster

Ivan Mičeta, Slobodan Tošić, Ivan Vukadinov, Mladen Šekularac, Andrija Crnogorac, Vladimir Tica, Marko Peković, Vladimir Rončević, Sreten Lakonić, Predrag Stojić, Miljan Pavković, and Petar Jovanović. Head coach: Veselin Matić.
