= Vladimir Tica =

Serbian basketball player

Personal information
- Born: 11 June 1981 (age 45) Doboj, SR Bosnia-Herzegovina, SFR Yugoslavia
- Listed height: 2.08 m (6 ft 10 in)
- Listed weight: 104 kg (229 lb)

Career information
- NBA draft: 2003: undrafted
- Playing career: 1998–2015
- Position: Center

Career history
- 1998–2003: Crvena zvezda
- 2003–2005: Hemofarm
- 2005: Dynamo Moscow Region
- 2005–2006: Khimik Yuzhny
- 2006: Dexia Mons
- 2006–2007: Phantoms Braunschweig
- 2007: Crvena zvezda
- 2008: Polpak Świecie
- 2008–2009: Basket Kwidzyn
- 2009–2010: AZS Koszalin
- 2010–2011: PBG Basket Poznań
- 2011–2012: Buducnost Podgorica
- 2012–2014: CSU Asesoft Ploiești
- 2014–2015: BC Timișoara

Career highlights
- 2× Romanian League champion (2012, 2013); Polish Cup winner (2010); Belgian Cup winner (2006)

Vladimir Tica (Serbian: Владимир Тица, born 11 June 1981) is a Serbian former professional basketball player. He is a 2.08 m tall center.

== National team ==
With a Serbian national under-16 basketball team, he won a gold medal at the 1997 Eurobasket.
