= Andrija Konc =

Croatian singer

Andrija Konc (10 November 1919 in Sombor – 1945 in Bjelovar) was one of the most popular Croatian singers of the early 1940s. He mostly performed schlager songs.

Konc was schooled in Bjelovar and in Zagreb where he was a member of the Croatian National Theatre in Zagreb chorus, but decided to start a career as performer. He frequently performed on Radio Zagreb (later known as Hrvatski Krugoval). Ljubo Kuntarić composed for Konc the song "Ti i ne slutiš" for Konc in 1943 which was a hit.

From 1939 to 1945, Konc was a star singer for Radio Zagreb and recorded around 60 records for the station, for such labels as Edison Bell Penkala (Zagreb), Patria (Budapest) and Elektron (Zagreb). Konc's last public performance was on 23 April 1945.

In 1945, he was taken by the Yugoslav Partisans to Zagreb's Kanal camp. After being released from the camp, Konc went to his hometown of Bjelovar, where he vanished and believed to be killed by OZNA near Bjelovar.

Most of Konc's recordings were destroyed in communist Yugoslavia. Since democratic reforms in Croatia Konc's legacy has been revived.
