= Andrija Marković =

Builder and stonemason

Andrija Marković (c. 1400 - after 1438) was a builder and stonemason living and working in the Republic of Ragusa during the turbulent fifteenth century when it became part of the Republic of Venice.

== Korčula ==
Andrija Marković, a builder and stonemason from the island of Korčula, was the founder of the famous Korčula architectural and stonemason family Andrijić. He is the son of the stonemason Marko Miličević, who learned the trade from Ivan from Vienna.

== Biography ==
After learning his trade early in his career, Andrija Marković teamed up with several stonemasons after he received a commission from the city and island of Korčula to construct a church.

One of the most noteworthy accomplishments was a foreign commission in San Salvo where he worked on the Cistercian abbey of Santi Vito e Salvo.

== Andrijić's family ==
Operating in Korčula and Dubrovnik, the Andrijići formed the core of the so-called Dubrovnik - Korčula School of Architecture and Stonemasonry. Acting continuously from the beginning of the 15th century to the end of the 16th century, they achieved a number of significant monuments in the late Gothic art and Renaissance movement. The last known Andrijić was a painter by the name of Kuzma Andrijić who worked on Korčula until the end of the 18th century. The others include:

- Marko Miličević (14th - 15th century)
- Andrija Marković (mentioned in archives since 1438)
- Vlahuša - Blaž Andrijić (mentioned from 1468 to 1516)
- Jerko Andrijić (mentioned from 1487 to 1518)
- Marko Andrijić (mentioned from 1470 to 1507)
- Petar Andrijić (mentioned from 1492 to 1553)
- Josip Andrijić (16th century)
- Andrija Andrijić (16th century)
- Andrija Markov (mentioned from 1511 to 1532)
- Frane Jerkov (mentioned from 1507 to 1523)
- Nikola Blažev (mentioned from 1512 to 1553)
- Josip Markov (mentioned from 1503 to 1547)
- Nikola Franov (late 16th century)
- Ivan Josipov (late 16th century)
- Kuzma Andrijić (end of the 18th century)

== Literature ==
- Cvito Fisković- Our builders and sculptors of the 15th and 16th centuries in Dubrovnik, Zagreb, 1947.
- Cvito Fisković- The first known Dubrovnik builders, JAZU, Dubrovnik, 1955.
- Vinko Foretić- The origin of the family of Korčula stonemasons Andrijić, Peristil, Br. 3, Zagreb, 1960.
