= Andreja Apostolović =

Serbian footballer

Personal information
- Full name: Andreja Apostolović
- Date of birth: 16 June 1996 (age 30)
- Place of birth: Pirot, FR Yugoslavia
- Height: 1.77 m (5 ft 9 1/2 in)
- Position: Attacking midfielder

Youth career
- 2010–2015: Radnički Pirot

Senior career*
Years	Team	Apps	(Gls)
2014–2015	Radnički Pirot	17	(0)
2015–2021	Radnički Niš	47	(2)
2021–2022	Radnički Pirot	11	(0)
2022–2023	OFK Senjak		
2023–	Tanasko Rajić Pirot		

International career^{‡}
2016	Serbia U20	1	(1)
2015	Serbia U23	1	(0)
- * Club domestic league appearances and goals as of 22 July 2018 ‡ National team caps and goals as of 13 November 2016

Andreja Apostolović (Serbian Cyrillic: Андреја Апостоловић; born 16 June 1996) is a Serbian former professional footballer who plays as a midfielder for Serbian SuperLiga club Radnički Niš.

== Career ==
=== Radnički Pirot ===
Born in Pirot, Apostolović started his career at Radnički ahead of the 2014–15 Serbian League East season. He made 17 appearances in Serbian League East for Radnički Pirot.

=== Radnički Niš ===
Apostolović joined FK Radnički Niš in summer 2015, signing a four-year contract on 26 August 2015. He made his SuperLiga debut against Javor Ivanjica. He was selected for the Serbia under-23 match against Qatar due to his efforts in the league. During the first half of the season, he was mostly used as a substitute, but after Anton Zemlianukhin left the club, Apostolović became part of the starting XI more often. He scored his first goal for Radnički Niš on 15 October 2016 against Bačka Bačka Palanka.
