= Miroljub Đorđević =

Serbian ice hockey player (born 1938)

Miroljub Đorđević Мирољуб Ђорђевић
- Born: 27 November 1938 (age 87) Belgrade, Yugoslavia
- Position: Forward
- Shoots: Left
- Played for: Crvena zvezda
- National team: Yugoslavia

Miroljub Đorđević (Serbian Cyrillic: Мирољуб Ђорђевић; born 27 November 1938) is a Serbian retired ice hockey player. He represented Yugoslavia in the men's tournament at the 1964 Winter Olympics and at the 1961 Ice Hockey World Championships.
