= Gymnázium Andreja Vrábla Levice =

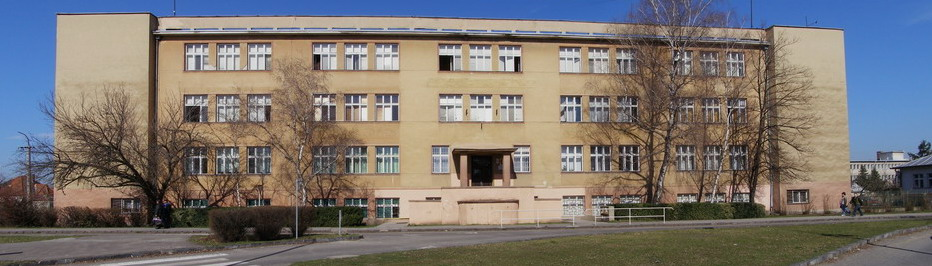

Location
- Mierová 5 Levice; Slovakia
- Coordinates: 48°13′0″N 18°35′33″E

Information
- Type: Grammar School
- Established: 1815

Gymnázium Andreja Vrábla Levice is a gymnasium located in Levice, Slovakia. It was named after Andrej Vrábel (1910–1991), a Slovak math teacher.

== History ==
The school began operating on November 5, 1815, with an initial enrollment of 135 students. It quickly gained a good reputation throughout the region. The main building survives from this time, though the two wings of the school were not built until the late 20th century to provide more space for classrooms and facilities. Currently the building supports approximately twenty classes and laboratories.

Originally, the main language of instruction at the school was Latin. After the revolutions of 1848 and 1849, the Austrian Government ordered the school to instruct its students in either Hungarian or German. Unable to continue operating under these conditions, the school declared bankruptcy in 1850. One year later, it reopened, but originally only offered reduced programs of study to prospective students.

On 8 June 1885, with a budget of 47,000 gold-coins, the cornerstone for a new building to accommodate burgeoning levels of enrollment was laid.

The school's facilities survived both World Wars, and it was used as a hospital throughout those periods. In 1945, reconstruction and renovation of the school began. Two side-wings were added to the main school building, and a whole new block was added to the back of the building.
