= Andreja Gomboc =

Slovenian astrophysicist (born 1969)

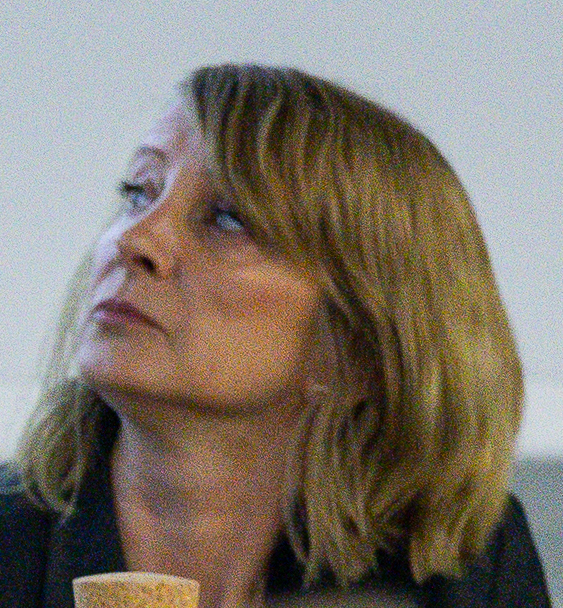
Andreja Gomboc

Andreja Gomboc (born 10 November 1969), is a Slovenian astrophysicist.

== Biography ==
Andreja Gomboc was born in Murska Sobota, Slovenia.

Andreja Gomboc graduated in 1995 at the Faculty of Mathematics and Physics (FMF) at University of Ljubljana with diploma work The appearance of a star falling in a black hole (Kako je videti padec zvezde v črno luknjo.).

From 1995 to 2001, she was a postgraduate student of physics at FMF and also a teaching assistant. She obtained Ph.D. by defending the dissertation Rapid luminosity changes due to interaction with a black hole (Hitre spremembe izseva ob interakciji s črno luknjo), which she prepared under the supervision of Andrej Čadež. In the dissertation she treated tidal disruption of stars during a close encounter with a massive black hole in a galactic nucleus. After obtaining her PhD, she became a member of the Department of Physics at FMF, where she was an associate professor of astronomy and astrophysics and lectured subjects: Astrophysics, Astronomy 2, Theoretical Astrophysics, Astrophysics of stars and the Galaxy, Selected topics in astrophysics and particle physics. In years 2008–2014 she gave lectures in Astronomy at the Faculty of Education in Ljubljana (PeF). Since autumn 2015, she is full professor of astronomy at the University of Nova Gorica.

For her Ph.D. dissertation she received the Pomurje research award in 2002.

From 2002 to 2004, she was a Marie Curie postdoctoral fellow at the Astrophysics Research Institute (ARI) of Liverpool John Moores University, England. There she became involved in research project for observing optical afterglows of gamma ray bursts with three largest robotic telescopes: Liverpool Telescope at Roque de los Muchachos Observatory at La Palma, Faulkes Telescope North at Hawaii and Faulkes Telescope South in Australia. GRB group at ARI, Liverpool John Moores University, among which members is also Andreja Gomboc, received The Times Higher Award for research project of the year 2007 Times Higher Education. The judging panel awarded excellent team work and results of measurement of optical afterglow polarisation, published in Science. Among other publications, she is also a co-author of two papers in Science and three papers in Nature.

In January 2010, she delivered a talk entitled "Us and the Universe" (Vesolje in mi) in National Assembly of Republic of Slovenia as part of the project "Harvesting Knowledge".

She is a member of the Gaia, which was launched by ESA in 2013. Gaia mission is measuring distances and radial velocities of about a billion of stars in our Galaxy.

From 2011 to 2014, she was the PI of the ESA project "Relativistic Global Navigation System".

Her research fields are astronomy and astrophysics, the general theory of relativity, black holes, gamma ray bursts, stellar rotation, and rotational velocities of symbiotic stars.

She publishes popular science articles on astronomy and astrophysics in Slovenian astronomical magazine Spika. She is the founder and editor of the web portal Portal v vesolje.

In the International Year of Astronomy 2009 (IYA) she was the Single Point of Contact and Coordinator for Slovenia. Among other IYA activities she initiated and organized exhibition of astro-photographs From Earth to the Universe at the Jakopič promenade in Tivoli City Park in Ljubljana, Travelling exhibition From Earth to the Universe, Open door days at Astronomical and Geophysical Observatory Golovec (AGO) and other. She was also co-editor of the proceedings of the workshop Slovenia and Space – yesterday, today and tomorrow and of the catalogue of the exhibition From Earth to the Universe. She received award Prometheus of Science 2007 (Prometej znanosti 2007) for co-editing monography Physics, My Profession – Life and Work of Our Female Physicists (Fizika, moj poklic – življenje in delo naših fizičark) and Prometheus of Science 2009 (for leading the Organizing Committee of International Year of Astronomy 2009 in Slovenia).

She is the president of the national committee for astronomy competition organized since 2009 by Society of Mathematicians, Physicists and Astronomers of Slovenia. Andreja Gomboc is a member of Marie Curie Fellows Organization PAZU, European Astronomical Society (EAS) and International Astronomical Union (IAU).

In 2015, she received Zois Certificate of Recognition, a Slovenian state award, for important research findings concerning Gamma Ray Bursts.

In 2016, she organized astronomical symposium New Frontiers in Black Hole Astrophysics, the first International Astronomical Union Symposium in Slovenia.

== See also ==
- List of astronomers
