= Andro Enukidze =

Georgian theater director

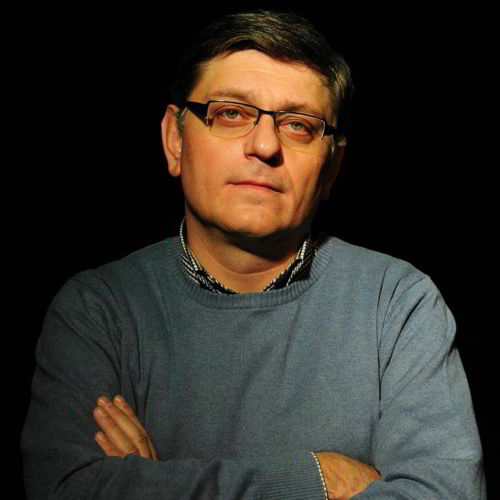
- Enukidze in 2015
- Born: January 9, 1965 (age 61); Tbilisi, Georgia
- Occupation: Theatre director
- Years active: 1987 -
- Spouse: Nini Kalichava
- Children: Anna, Helen

Andro Enukidze (Georgian: ანდრო ენუქიძე; born January 9, 1965) is a Georgian theater director.

== Biography ==
Andro Enukidze was born January 9, 1965, in Tbilisi.

He studied under Temur Chkheidze at the Shota Rustaveli Theatre and Film University. Graduating in 1987, he began his career at chair of acting skills of theatrical institute.

Andro Enukidze puts performances at theaters: Shota Rustaveli's, Kote Mardjanishvili's, and also cooperates with other theaters. He put about 40 performances. Since 2014 he is artistic director in Batumi Ilia Chavchavadze State Theatre.

Together with Robert Sturua co-founder of director's faculty, the first in the history of Turkey (Bilkent University, Ankara). He worked as a director at the national theaters of Poland and Romania.

In addition, Andro Enukidze writes plays, sometimes together with playwright Miho Mosulishvili which are put on at theaters of Georgia and are published in literary magazines.

== Performances ==
- Macbath by William Shakespeare, Batumi Ilia Chavchavadze State Theatre, 2014
- Play Strindberg by Friedrich Durrenmatt, Rustaveli Theatre, with Robert Sturua, 2009
- Happiness of Irine by David Kldiashvili, Rustaveli theatre, 2007

== The first channel of the Georgian television ==
- Villain by Jorge Luis Borges, 1998
- My Friend Hitler, the coauthor of the scenario Miho Mosulishvili (based on the play of Yukio Mishima of the same name), 1999.
- Night of Small Stars (45-serial TV series), the coauthor of the scenario with - Miho Mosulishvili, Coba Tskhakaya, Soso Mchedlishvili, Alexander Kokrashvili; - 2000

== Awards ==
- Award the Ministry of Culture of Georgia for the play "And Tomorrow Premiere", (Coauthor Miho Mosulishvili), 1989
- Award of the Ministry of Culture of Georgia for the play "The Thirteenth Experimental", (Coauthor Miho Mosulishvili), 1991
- "For the best direction" at a festival of the Georgian theaters, 1988
- "For the best direction" at the International festival "Gold Mask" of Tbilisi, 2000
- The Grand Prix at the Dostoyevsky festival in Staraya Russa for the performance 'Dostoevsky.ru' (Based on "Notes from the Dead house" Fyodor Mikhaylovich Dostoyevsky), 2005
