= Andrija Crnogorac =

Serbian basketball player

Personal information
- Born: September 23, 1981 (age 45) Gradiška, SR Bosnia and Herzegovina, SFR Yugoslavia
- Listed height: 2.02 m (6 ft 8 in)

Career information
- Playing career: 1997–2011
- Position: Power forward

Career history
- 1997–1999: Partizan
- 1999–2002: Radnički
- 2002–2003: Sloga
- 2003–2004: Avala Ada
- 2004–2005: Triglav Kranj
- 2005–2008: Lugano Tigers
- 2008–2011: SAV Vacallo Basket
- 2011: Lugano Tigers

Career highlights
- Yugoslav Cup winner (1999)
Medals
Men's basketball
Representing FR Yugoslavia
European Championship for Cadets
Gold medal – first place	1997 Belgium	U16 Team

Andrija Crnogorac (born September 23, 1981) is a former Serbian professional basketball player. He start his career in Partizan. He played in Partizan 2 years and won Yugoslav Cup in 1999.
